= 2020–21 Men's FIH Pro League squads =

This article lists the squads of all participating teams in the 2020–21 FIH Pro League. The nine national teams involved in the tournament were required to register a squad of up to 32 players.

Age, caps and club for each player are as of 17 January 2020, the first day of the season.

== Argentina ==
The following is the Argentina squad for the 2020 FIH Pro League.

Head coach: Germán Orozco

No.	Pos.	Player	Date of birth (age)	Caps	Club
1	GK	Juan Manuel Vivaldi	17 July 1979 (aged 40)	272	(Argentina) Banco Provincia
2	GK	Nehuen Hernando	23 June 2000 (aged 19)	0	(Argentina) Ducilo
3	GK	Emiliano Bosso	3 December 1995 (aged 24)	4	(Argentina) GEBA
4	DF	Juan Catán	5 October 1995 (aged 24)	16	(Argentina) Hurling
5	DF	Pedro Ibarra (Captain)	11 September 1985 (aged 34)	291	(Argentina) San Fernando
6	MF	Santiago Tarazona	31 May 1996 (aged 23)	51	(Argentina) GEBA
7	FW	Nicolás Keenan	6 May 1997 (aged 22)	16	(Netherlands) Klein Zwitserland
9	FW	Maico Casella	5 June 1997 (aged 22)	58	(Netherlands) HGC
12	FW	Lucas Vila	23 August 1986 (aged 33)	237	(Germany) Mannheimer HC
13	DF	Leandro Tolini	14 March 1990 (aged 29)	57	(Belgium) Gantoise
14	FW	Facundo Callioni	9 October 1985 (aged 34)	153	(Belgium) Orée
15	FW	Tomás Domene (Inactive)	4 September 1997 (aged 22)	14	(Belgium) Orée
15	MF	Diego Paz	10 August 1992 (aged 27)	31	(Argentina) Ciudad
16	MF	Ignacio Ortiz	26 July 1987 (aged 32)	156	(Argentina) Banco Provincia
17	DF	Juan Martín López	27 May 1985 (aged 34)	297	(Argentina) Banco Provincia
18	DF	Federico Monja	12 September 1993 (aged 26)	8	(Argentina) Banco Provincia
19	FW	Tomás Bettaglio (Inactive)	23 September 1991 (aged 28)	24	(Argentina) Banco Provincia
19	MF	Ignacio Nepote	30 June 1997 (aged 22)	0	(Argentina) Quilmes
20	MF	Isidoro Ibarra	2 October 1992 (aged 27)	51	(Belgium) Antwerp
21	GK	Tomás Santiago	15 June 1992 (aged 27)	22	(Belgium) Gantoise
22	DF	Matías Rey	1 December 1984 (aged 35)	203	(Spain) Real Club de Polo
23	FW	Lucas Martínez	17 November 1993 (aged 26)	60	(Netherlands) Oranje-Rood
24	DF	Nicolás Cicileo	1 October 1993 (aged 26)	44	(Netherlands) Klein Zwitserland
25	MF	Nicolas Acosta	7 July 1996 (aged 23)	11	(Argentina) Jockey Club de Rosario
26	MF	Agustín Mazzilli	20 June 1989 (aged 30)	217	(Netherlands) Pinoké
27	MF	Lucas Rossi	2 June 1985 (aged 34)	213	(Belgium) Beerschot
28	MF	Federico Fernández	28 February 1992 (aged 27)	36	(Netherlands) Tilburg
29	MF	Thomas Habif	27 May 1996 (aged 23)	6	(Argentina) GEBA
30	MF	Agustín Bugallo	23 April 1995 (aged 24)	66	(Netherlands) Pinoké
31	FW	Mauro Coria (Inactive)	19 December 1996 (aged 23)	0	(Argentina) Mendoza
31	MF	Lucas Toscani	22 November 1999 (aged 20)	5	(Argentina) Banco Provincia
32	FW	Martín Ferreiro	21 October 1997 (aged 22)	39	(Netherlands) Pinoké
33	FW	Gaspar Garrone	1 August 2000 (aged 19)	0	(Argentina) Universitario de Córdoba
34	FW	Facundo Zárate	31 July 2000 (aged 19)	0	(Argentina) Jockey Club Córdoba

== Australia ==
The following is the Australia squad for the 2020 FIH Pro League.

Head coach: Colin Batch

No.	Pos.	Player	Date of birth (age)	Caps	Club
1	MF	Lachlan Sharp	2 July 1997 (aged 22)	42	(Australia) NSW Pride
2	MF	Tom Craig	3 September 1995 (aged 24)	97	(Australia) NSW Pride
3	DF	Corey Weyer	28 March 1996 (aged 23)	38	(Australia) Brisbane Blaze
4	DF	Jake Harvie	5 March 1998 (aged 21)	64	(Australia) Perth Thundersticks
5	FW	Tom Wickham	26 May 1990 (aged 29)	48	(Australia) Perth Thundersticks
6	DF	Matt Dawson	27 April 1994 (aged 25)	132	(Australia) NSW Pride
7	FW	Nathan Ephraums	9 June 1999 (aged 20)	0	(Australia) HC Melbourne
8	GK	Johan Durst	18 March 1991 (aged 28)	3	(Australia) HC Melbourne
9	FW	Jacob Anderson	22 March 1997 (aged 22)	19	(Australia) Brisbane Blaze
10	DF	Joshua Beltz	24 April 1995 (aged 24)	39	(Australia) Tassie Tigers
11	MF	Eddie Ockenden (Captain)	3 April 1987 (aged 32)	358	(Australia) Tassie Tigers
12	FW	Jacob Whetton	15 June 1991 (aged 28)	197	(Australia) Brisbane Blaze
13	FW	Blake Govers	6 July 1996 (aged 23)	97	(Australia) NSW Pride
15	DF	Joshua Simmonds	4 October 1995 (aged 24)	15	(Australia) HC Melbourne
16	DF	Tim Howard	23 June 1996 (aged 23)	54	(Australia) Brisbane Blaze
17	MF	Aran Zalewski (Captain)	21 March 1991 (aged 28)	183	(Australia) Perth Thundersticks
18	MF	Kurt Lovett	15 January 1997 (aged 23)	0	(Australia) NSW Pride
20	DF	Matthew Swann	16 May 1989 (aged 30)	198	(Australia) Brisbane Blaze
21	FW	Jack Welch	26 October 1997 (aged 22)	5	(Australia) Tassie Tigers
22	MF	Flynn Ogilvie	17 September 1993 (aged 26)	103	(Australia) NSW Pride
23	MF	Daniel Beale	12 February 1993 (aged 26)	171	(Australia) Brisbane Blaze
24	GK	Tyler Lovell	23 May 1987 (aged 32)	141	(Australia) Perth Thundersticks
25	FW	Trent Mitton	26 November 1990 (aged 29)	168	(Australia) Perth Thundersticks
26	FW	Dylan Wotherspoon	9 April 1993 (aged 26)	86	(Australia) Brisbane Blaze
29	FW	Tim Brand	29 November 1998 (aged 21)	34	(Australia) NSW Pride
30	GK	Andrew Charter	30 March 1987 (aged 32)	177	(Australia) Canberra Chill
32	DF	Jeremy Hayward	3 March 1993 (aged 26)	149	(Australia) Tassie Tigers

== Belgium ==
The following is the Belgium squad for the 2020 FIH Pro League.

Head coach: (New Zealand) Shane McLeod

No.	Pos.	Player	Date of birth (age)	Caps	Club
1	GK	Simon Vandenbroucke	6 June 1999 (aged 20)	2	(Belgium) Beerschot
2	GK	Loic Van Doren	14 September 1996 (aged 23)	21	(Netherlands) Den Bosch
3	FW	Thibeau Stockbroekx	20 July 2000 (aged 19)	2	(Netherlands) Oranje-Rood
4	DF	Arthur Van Doren	1 October 1994 (aged 25)	178	(Netherlands) Bloemendaal
5	DF	Nicolas Poncelet	19 September 1996 (aged 23)	16	(Belgium) Léopold
7	MF	John-John Dohmen	24 January 1988 (aged 31)	390	(Belgium) Waterloo Ducks
8	FW	Florent Van Aubel	25 October 1991 (aged 28)	227	(Belgium) Dragons
9	FW	Sébastien Dockier	28 December 1989 (aged 30)	191	(Netherlands) Den Bosch
10	FW	Cédric Charlier	27 November 1987 (aged 32)	314	(Belgium) Dragons
11	FW	Tommy Willems	13 April 1997 (aged 22)	4	(Belgium) Waterloo Ducks
12	DF	Gauthier Boccard	26 August 1991 (aged 28)	216	(Belgium) Waterloo Ducks
13	FW	Nicolas De Kerpel	23 March 1993 (aged 26)	62	(Belgium) Herakles
14	MF	Augustin Meurmans	29 May 1997 (aged 22)	59	(Belgium) Racing
15	DF	Emmanuel Stockbroekx	23 December 1993 (aged 26)	152	(Belgium) Dragons
16	DF	Alexander Hendrickx	6 August 1993 (aged 26)	118	(Netherlands) Pinoké
17	FW	Thomas Briels (Captain)	23 August 1987 (aged 32)	338	(Netherlands) Oranje-Rood
18	FW	Maxime Plennevaux	14 June 1993 (aged 26)	24	(Belgium) Léopold
19	MF	Félix Denayer	31 January 1990 (aged 29)	315	(Belgium) Dragons
20	FW	William Ghislain	28 July 1999 (aged 20)	4	(Belgium) Waterloo Ducks
21	GK	Vincent Vanasch	21 December 1987 (aged 32)	231	(Belgium) Waterloo Ducks
22	MF	Simon Gougnard	17 January 1991 (aged 29)	272	(Belgium) Leuven
23	DF	Arthur De Sloover	3 May 1997 (aged 22)	79	(Belgium) Beerschot
24	MF	Antoine Kina	13 February 1996 (aged 23)	62	(Belgium) Gantoise
25	DF	Loïck Luypaert	19 August 1991 (aged 28)	238	(Belgium) Braxgata
26	MF	Victor Wegnez	25 December 1995 (aged 24)	84	(Belgium) Racing
27	FW	Tom Boon	25 January 1990 (aged 29)	290	(Belgium) Léopold
32	FW	Tanguy Cosyns	29 June 1991 (aged 28)	131	(Netherlands) Amsterdam

== Germany ==
The following is the Germany squad for the 2020 FIH Pro League.

Head coach: Kais al Saadi

No.	Pos.	Player	Date of birth (age)	Caps	Club
1	GK	Mark Appel	5 July 1994 (aged 25)	19	(Germany) Club an der Alster
2	DF	Mathias Müller	3 April 1992 (aged 27)	114	(Germany) Hamburger Polo Club
3	MF	Mats Grambusch	4 November 1992 (aged 27)	148	(Germany) Rot-Weiss Köln
4	DF	Lukas Windfeder	11 May 1995 (aged 24)	109	(Germany) Uhlenhorst Mülheim
5	DF	Linus Müller	2 December 1999 (aged 20)	2	(Germany) Mannheimer HC
6	DF	Martin Häner (Captain)	27 August 1988 (aged 31)	247	(Germany) Berliner HC
7	FW	Jonas Gomoll	28 January 1993 (aged 26)	43	(Germany) Rot-Weiss Köln
8	FW	Paul-Philipp Kaufmann	21 June 1996 (aged 23)	0	(Germany) TSV Mannheim
9	FW	Niklas Wellen	14 December 1994 (aged 25)	133	(Germany) Crefelder HTC
10	FW	Thies Prinz	7 July 1998 (aged 21)	17	(Germany) Rot-Weiss Köln
11	MF	Constantin Staib	31 August 1995 (aged 24)	65	(Germany) Hamburger Polo Club
12	MF	Timm Herzbruch	7 June 1997 (aged 22)	78	(Germany) Uhlenhorst Mülheim
13	DF	Tobias Hauke	11 September 1987 (aged 32)	305	(Germany) Harvestehude
14	FW	Jan Schiffer	3 May 1998 (aged 21)	0	(Germany) Uhlenhorst Mülheim
15	MF	Luis Gill	27 November 1997 (aged 22)	0	(Germany) Berliner HC
16	DF	Paul Dösch	11 May 1998 (aged 21)	0	(Germany) Berliner HC
17	FW	Christopher Rühr	19 December 1993 (aged 26)	137	(Germany) Rot-Weiss Köln
18	DF	Ferdinand Weinke	26 January 1995 (aged 24)	59	(Germany) Uhlenhorst Mülheim
19	MF	Justus Weigand	20 April 2000 (aged 19)	0	(Germany) Mannheimer HC
20	MF	Martin Zwicker	27 February 1987 (aged 32)	230	(Germany) Berliner HC
21	DF	Benedikt Schwarzhaupt	14 January 2001 (aged 19)	0	(Germany) UHC Hamburg
22	FW	Marco Miltkau	18 August 1990 (aged 29)	100	(Belgium) Gantoise
23	FW	Florian Fuchs	10 November 1991 (aged 28)	214	(Netherlands) Bloemendaal
24	MF	Benedikt Fürk	20 October 1988 (aged 31)	165	(Germany) Uhlenhorst Mülheim
25	DF	Teo Hinrichs	17 September 1999 (aged 20)	16	(Germany) Mannheimer HC
26	DF	Niklas Bosserhoff	15 April 1998 (aged 21)	17	(Germany) Uhlenhorst Mülheim
27	FW	Timur Oruz	27 October 1994 (aged 25)	75	(Germany) Rot-Weiss Köln
28	MF	Moritz Röthlander	10 November 1997 (aged 22)	17	(Germany) TSV Mannheim
29	MF	Johannes Große	7 January 1997 (aged 23)	51	(Germany) Rot-Weiss Köln
30	GK	Victor Aly	2 June 1994 (aged 25)	22	(Germany) Rot-Weiss Köln
31	FW	Malte Hellwig	23 October 1997 (aged 22)	17	(Germany) Uhlenhorst Mülheim
32	GK	Alexander Stadler	16 October 1999 (aged 20)	0	(Germany) TSV Mannheim
33	DF	Moritz Ludwig	14 September 2001 (aged 18)	0	(Germany) Uhlenhorst Mülheim
34	FW	Raphael Hartkopf	24 November 1998 (aged 21)	0	(Germany) Mannheimer HC
35	FW	Hannes Müller	18 May 2000 (aged 19)	2	(Germany) UHC Hamburg
36	MF	Mario Schachner	19 September 2001 (aged 18)	0	(Germany) Mannheimer HC
37	FW	Paul Smith	21 January 2000 (aged 19)	0	(Germany) Großflottbek
38	DF	Antheus Barry	6 October 2002 (aged 17)	0	(Germany) Rot-Weiss Köln
39	DF	Luca Wolff	23 November 2001 (aged 18)	0	(Germany) Club an der Alster
40	MF	Erik Kleinlein	3 December 2001 (aged 18)	0	(Germany) HG Nürnberg
45	DF	Christopher Kutter	22 January 2000 (aged 19)	0	(Germany) UHC Hamburg

== Great Britain ==
The following is the Great Britain squad for the 2020 FIH Pro League.

Head coach: (England) Danny Kerry

No.	Pos.	Player	Date of birth (age)	Caps	Club
1	GK	George Pinner	18 January 1987 (aged 32)	191	(England) Old Georgians
3	DF	Luke Taylor	15 September 1994 (aged 25)	31	(England) Surbiton
4	DF	Ollie Willars (Inactive)	25 June 1990 (aged 29)	138	(England) Beeston
5	MF	David Ames	25 June 1989 (aged 30)	154	(England) Holcombe
6	DF	Henry Weir	13 February 1990 (aged 29)	182	(England) Wimbledon
7	FW	Alan Forsyth	5 April 1992 (aged 27)	179	(England) Surbiton
8	MF	Rupert Shipperley	21 November 1992 (aged 27)	70	(England) Hampstead & Westminster
9	MF	Harry Martin	23 October 1992 (aged 27)	224	(England) Hampstead & Westminster
10	FW	Chris Griffiths	3 September 1990 (aged 29)	100	(England) East Grinstead
11	MF	Ian Sloan	19 November 1993 (aged 26)	121	(England) Wimbledon
13	FW	Sam Ward	24 December 1990 (aged 29)	126	(England) Old Georgians
15	MF	Phil Roper	24 January 1992 (aged 27)	140	(England) Wimbledon
16	DF	Adam Dixon (Captain)	11 September 1986 (aged 33)	267	(England) Beeston
17	MF	Ashley Jackson (Inactive)	27 August 1987 (aged 32)	246	(England) Old Georgians
18	DF	Brendan Creed	3 January 1992 (aged 28)	74	(England) Surbiton
19	MF	David Goodfield	15 June 1993 (aged 26)	48	(England) Surbiton
20	GK	Ollie Payne	6 April 1999 (aged 20)	0	(England) Durham University
21	FW	Liam Ansell	12 November 1993 (aged 26)	40	(England) East Grinstead
22	MF	David Condon	6 July 1991 (aged 28)	176	(England) East Grinstead
23	GK	Harry Gibson	25 March 1993 (aged 26)	75	(England) Surbiton
25	DF	Jack Waller	28 January 1997 (aged 22)	40	(England) Wimbledon
26	MF	James Gall	20 May 1995 (aged 24)	74	(England) Surbiton
27	DF	Liam Sanford	14 March 1996 (aged 23)	57	(England) Old Georgians
29	MF	Tom Sorsby	28 October 1996 (aged 23)	22	(England) Surbiton
30	MF	Rhys Smith	13 March 1997 (aged 22)	11	(England) Wimbledon
31	FW	Will Calnan	17 April 1996 (aged 23)	31	(England) Hampstead & Westminster
32	MF	Zachary Wallace	29 September 1999 (aged 20)	39	(England) Surbiton
33	DF	Jacob Draper	24 July 1998 (aged 21)	49	(England) Hampstead & Westminster

== India ==
The following is the India squad for the 2020 FIH Pro League.

Head coach: (Australia) Graham Reid

No.	Pos.	Player	Date of birth (age)	Caps	Club
2	FW	Dilpreet Singh	12 November 1999 (aged 20)	40	(India) Railways Sports Promotion Board
3	DF	Rupinder Pal Singh	11 November 1990 (aged 29)	210	(India) Indian Overseas Bank
4	DF	Jarmanpreet Singh	18 July 1996 (aged 23)	14	(India) Railways Sports Promotion Board
5	DF	Kothajit Khadangbam	17 August 1992 (aged 27)	206	(India) Indian Oil Corporation
6	DF	Surender Kumar	23 November 1993 (aged 26)	127	Food Corporation of India
7	MF	Manpreet Singh	26 June 1992 (aged 27)	261	(India) Punjab Armed Police
8	MF	Hardik Singh	23 September 1998 (aged 21)	33	(India) Petroleum Sports Promotion Board
9	FW	Gurjant Singh	26 January 1995 (aged 24)	41	(India) ONGC
10	FW	Simranjeet Singh	27 December 1996 (aged 23)	45	(India) Indian Oil Corporation
11	FW	Mandeep Singh	25 January 1995 (aged 24)	153	(India) ONGC
12	GK	Krishan Pathak	24 April 1997 (aged 22)	42	(India) Petroleum Sports Promotion Board
13	DF	Harmanpreet Singh	6 January 1996 (aged 24)	111	(India) BPCL
14	FW	Lalit Upadhyay	1 December 1993 (aged 26)	100	(India) Railways Sports Promotion Board
15	DF	Nilam Xess	7 November 1998 (aged 21)	14	(India) Hockey Odisha
16	GK	P. R. Sreejesh	8 May 1988 (aged 31)	228	
17	MF	Sumit	20 December 1996 (aged 23)	63	(India) Hockey Haryana
18	MF	Nilakanta Sharma	2 May 1995 (aged 24)	53	(India) Railways Sports Promotion Board
21	FW	Shamsher Singh	29 July 1997 (aged 22)	4	(India) Punjab National Bank
22	DF	Varun Kumar	25 July 1995 (aged 24)	83	(India) BPCL
23	DF	Gurinder Singh	1 January 1995 (aged 25)	54	(India) Indian Oil Corporation
24	FW	S. V. Sunil	6 May 1989 (aged 30)	261	(India) BPCL
26	DF	Birendra Lakra	3 February 1990 (aged 29)	191	(India) BPCL
27	FW	Akashdeep Singh	2 December 1994 (aged 25)	191	(India) Punjab Armed Police
29	MF	Chinglensana Kangujam	2 December 1991 (aged 28)	203	(India) Railways Sports Promotion Board
30	DF	Amit Rohidas	10 May 1993 (aged 26)	89	(India) Railways Sports Promotion Board
31	FW	Ramandeep Singh	1 April 1993 (aged 26)	135	(India) Punjab and Sind Bank
32	MF	Vivek Prasad	25 February 2000 (aged 19)	54	(India) BPCL
48	DF	Dipsan Tirkey	15 October 1998 (aged 21)	24	(India) BPCL
65	MF	Jaskaran Singh	27 January 1994 (aged 25)	6	(India) Punjab and Sind Bank
69	MF	Raj Kumar Pal	1 May 1998 (aged 21)	0	Air India Sports Promotion Board
71	FW	Gursahibjit Singh	5 February 1999 (aged 20)	17	(India) Hockey Punjab
77	GK	Suraj Karkera	14 October 1995 (aged 24)	26	(India) Services Sports Control Board

== Netherlands ==
The following is the Netherlands squad for the 2020 FIH Pro League.

Head coach: (Argentina) Maximiliano Caldas

No.	Pos.	Player	Date of birth (age)	Caps	Club
2	FW	Jeroen Hertzberger	24 February 1986 (aged 33)	242	(Netherlands) Rotterdam
4	DF	Lars Balk	26 February 1996 (aged 23)	54	(Netherlands) Kampong
5	FW	Thijs van Dam	5 January 1997 (aged 23)	40	(Netherlands) Rotterdam
6	MF	Jonas de Geus	29 April 1998 (aged 21)	73	(Netherlands) Kampong
7	MF	Jorrit Croon	9 August 1998 (aged 21)	74	(Netherlands) Bloemendaal
8	MF	Billy Bakker (Captain)	23 November 1988 (aged 31)	211	(Netherlands) Amsterdam
9	MF	Seve van Ass	10 April 1992 (aged 27)	169	(Netherlands) HGC
10	MF	Valentin Verga	7 October 1989 (aged 30)	189	(Netherlands) Amsterdam
11	DF	Glenn Schuurman	16 April 1991 (aged 28)	136	(Netherlands) Bloemendaal
12	DF	Sander de Wijn	2 May 1990 (aged 29)	141	(Netherlands) Kampong
13	DF	Sander Baart	30 April 1988 (aged 31)	191	(Belgium) Braxgata
14	MF	Robbert Kemperman	24 June 1990 (aged 29)	208	(Netherlands) Kampong
15	MF	Diede van Puffelen	20 February 1992 (aged 27)	29	(Netherlands) Rotterdam
16	FW	Mirco Pruyser	11 August 1989 (aged 30)	118	(Netherlands) Amsterdam
17	FW	Roel Bovendeert	8 May 1992 (aged 27)	28	(Netherlands) Bloemendaal
18	FW	Bjorn Kellerman	25 May 1990 (aged 29)	60	(Netherlands) Kampong
19	FW	Bob de Voogd	16 September 1988 (aged 31)	144	(Belgium) Braxgata
20	FW	Terrance Pieters	14 December 1996 (aged 23)	15	(Netherlands) Kampong
21	GK	Maurits Visser	8 June 1995 (aged 24)	3	(Netherlands) Bloemendaal
22	GK	Sam van der Ven	5 September 1989 (aged 30)	55	(Netherlands) HGC
23	DF	Joep de Mol	10 December 1995 (aged 24)	72	(Netherlands) Oranje-Rood
25	FW	Thierry Brinkman	19 March 1995 (aged 24)	94	(Netherlands) Bloemendaal
26	GK	Pirmin Blaak	8 March 1988 (aged 31)	92	(Netherlands) Oranje-Rood
27	DF	Jip Janssen	14 October 1997 (aged 22)	28	(Netherlands) Kampong
28	DF	Floris Wortelboer	4 August 1996 (aged 23)	51	(Netherlands) Bloemendaal
30	DF	Mink van der Weerden	19 December 1988 (aged 31)	167	(Netherlands) Oranje-Rood
31	DF	Teun Beins	28 October 1998 (aged 21)	3	(Netherlands) Oranje-Rood
32	DF	Justen Blok	27 September 2000 (aged 19)	3	(Netherlands) Rotterdam
34	FW	Jelle Galema (Inactive)	16 November 1992 (aged 27)	69	(Netherlands) Den Bosch

== New Zealand ==
The following is the New Zealand squad for the 2020 FIH Pro League.

Head coach: Darren Smith

No.	Pos.	Player	Date of birth (age)	Caps	Club
2	DF	Cory Bennett	12 July 1991 (aged 28)	102	(New Zealand) North Harbour
3	DF	David Brydon	27 June 1996 (aged 23)	50	(New Zealand) Canterbury
4	DF	Dane Lett	29 August 1990 (aged 29)	69	(New Zealand) Capital
5	DF	Nick Haig	12 March 1987 (aged 32)	210	(Belgium) Herakles
6	FW	Simon Child	16 April 1988 (aged 31)	280	(New Zealand) Auckland
7	MF	Nick Ross	26 July 1990 (aged 29)	122	(New Zealand) Southern
8	GK	Richard Joyce	30 July 1992 (aged 27)	82	(New Zealand) North Harbour
9	FW	Sam Hiha	26 August 1997 (aged 22)	0	(New Zealand) Central
10	MF	Steve Edwards	25 January 1986 (aged 33)	209	(New Zealand) North Harbour
11	FW	Jacob Smith	3 April 1991 (aged 28)	79	(New Zealand) Capital
12	FW	Sam Lane	30 April 1997 (aged 22)	57	(New Zealand) Canterbury
13	FW	Marcus Child	2 March 1991 (aged 28)	165	(New Zealand) Auckland
14	FW	Jared Panchia	18 October 1993 (aged 26)	127	(New Zealand) Auckland
15	GK	George Enersen	7 June 1991 (aged 28)	60	(New Zealand) Canterbury
16	DF	Aidan Sarikaya	3 July 1996 (aged 23)	41	(Belgium) Herakles
17	MF	Nic Woods	26 August 1995 (aged 24)	122	(Belgium) Racing
18	DF	Brad Read	4 February 1995 (aged 24)	30	(New Zealand) Capital
19	MF	George Connell	5 June 1990 (aged 29)	6	(New Zealand) Canterbury
20	DF	Dwayne Rowsell	8 October 1991 (aged 28)	25	(New Zealand) Auckland
21	DF	Kane Russell	22 April 1992 (aged 27)	155	(Netherlands) Rotterdam
22	DF	Blair Tarrant (Captain)	11 May 1990 (aged 29)	206	(Netherlands) Rotterdam
23	FW	Dylan Thomas	14 February 1996 (aged 23)	21	(New Zealand) Central
24	MF	Arun Panchia	22 April 1989 (aged 30)	285	(New Zealand) Auckland
25	MF	Shea McAleese	7 August 1984 (aged 35)	304	(New Zealand) Central
26	MF	Xavier Guy	5 June 1998 (aged 21)	2	(New Zealand) North Harbour
27	FW	Stephen Jenness	7 June 1990 (aged 29)	244	(Belgium) Herakles
28	FW	Dominic Newman	7 November 1996 (aged 23)	56	(New Zealand) Canterbury
29	FW	Hugo Inglis	18 January 1991 (aged 28)	232	(Netherlands) Rotterdam
30	MF	George Muir	24 February 1994 (aged 25)	135	(New Zealand) North Harbour
33		Tim Neild	4 July 1999 (aged 20)	0	(New Zealand) Midlands
34	GK	Leon Hayward	23 April 1990 (aged 29)	17	(New Zealand) Auckland
35		Benji Edwards	2 April 1998 (aged 21)	0	(New Zealand) North Harbour

== Spain ==
The following is the Spain squad for the 2020 FIH Pro League.

Head coach: (France) Frederic Soyez

No.	Pos.	Player	Date of birth (age)	Caps	Club
1	GK	Quico Cortés	29 March 1983 (aged 36)	298	(Spain) Club Egara
2	DF	Marc Perellón	21 February 1997 (aged 22)	36	(Spain) Junior
4	DF	Ricardo Sánchez	4 December 1992 (aged 27)	74	(Spain) Complutense
5	DF	Marc Serrahima	25 April 1995 (aged 24)	68	(Spain) Junior
6	DF	Ignacio Rodríguez	12 June 1996 (aged 23)	54	(Spain) Club de Campo
7	MF	Miquel Delàs (Captain)	13 April 1984 (aged 35)	247	(Spain) Barcelona
8	FW	Quique González	29 April 1996 (aged 23)	111	(Spain) Club de Campo
9	MF	Álvaro Iglesias	1 March 1993 (aged 26)	132	(Spain) Club de Campo
10	MF	Marc Sallés	6 May 1987 (aged 32)	233	(Spain) Atlètic Terrassa
11	FW	Roc Oliva	18 July 1989 (aged 30)	165	(Spain) Real Club de Polo
12	MF	Joan Tarrés	8 May 1996 (aged 23)	43	(Spain) Atlètic Terrassa
13	MF	David Alegre	6 September 1984 (aged 35)	264	(Spain) Real Club de Polo
14	DF	Ricardo Santana	27 February 1993 (aged 26)	120	(Belgium) Leuven
15	FW	Diego Arana	12 September 1988 (aged 31)	55	(Belgium) Herakles
16	DF	Llorenç Piera	4 November 1996 (aged 23)	29	(Spain) Real Club de Polo
17	FW	Xavi Lleonart	22 June 1990 (aged 29)	198	(Spain) Real Club de Polo
18	MF	Alejandro de Frutos	29 September 1992 (aged 27)	113	(Spain) Club de Campo
19	FW	José Basterra	3 January 1997 (aged 23)	0	(Spain) Club de Campo
20	DF	Álex Alonso	14 February 1999 (aged 20)	0	(Spain) Tenis
21	MF	Viçens Ruiz	30 October 1991 (aged 28)	154	(Spain) Real Club de Polo
22	FW	Albert Béltran	23 October 1993 (aged 26)	82	(Spain) Atlètic Terrassa
23	DF	Josep Romeu	22 May 1990 (aged 29)	126	(Spain) Club Egara
24	GK	Mario Garín	26 April 1992 (aged 27)	54	(Spain) Club de Campo
25	FW	Pau Quemada	4 September 1983 (aged 36)	268	(Spain) Club Egara
26	MF	Pepe Cunill	9 July 2001 (aged 18)	0	(Spain) Atlètic Terrassa
27	FW	Marc Boltó	21 November 1995 (aged 24)	63	(Spain) Atlètic Terrassa
28	MF	Marc Miralles	14 November 1997 (aged 22)	26	(Spain) CD Terrassa
29	MF	Xavi Gispert	4 January 1999 (aged 21)	4	(Spain) Club Egara
30	DF	Marc Recasens	13 September 1999 (aged 20)	4	(Spain) Club Egara
31	GK	Albert Pérez	18 January 1995 (aged 24)	1	(Spain) Junior
32	GK	Rafa Álvarez	16 February 1998 (aged 21)	0	(Spain) Complutense
