= 2019 Men's FIH Pro League =

Men's field hockey competition

- Dates: 19 January – 30 June
- Teams: 8 (from 3 confederations)

Final positions
- Champions: Australia (1st title)
- Runner-up: Belgium
- Third place: Netherlands

Tournament statistics
- Matches played: 60
- Goals scored: 308 (5.13 per match)
- Top scorer: (Australia) Blake Govers (12 goals)
- Best player: (Australia) Aran Zalewski

The 2019 Men's FIH Pro League was the first season of the Pro League, the premier men's field hockey national team league series. The tournament started in January 2019 and finished in June 2019 in Amstelveen, Netherlands.

Australia defeated Belgium 3–2 in the final to win the first FIH Pro League title. The Netherlands won the third-place match against Great Britain 5–3.

The competition also served as a qualifier for the 2020 Summer Olympics with the four best teams qualifying for the FIH Olympic Qualifiers taking place in October and November 2019.

== Qualification ==
Nine teams competed in a round-robin tournament with home and away matches, played from January to June, with the top four teams advancing to the final at the Wagener Stadium in Amstelveen, Netherlands. In July 2017, Hockey India decided to withdraw the men's national team from the competition as they estimated the chances of qualifying for the Summer Olympics to be higher when participating in the Hockey Series. Hockey India also cited lack of clarity in the ranking system. The International Hockey Federation subsequently invited Spain instead. Pakistan was suspended on 23 January 2019 after they could not play their first three games.

- Belgium (1)
- Australia (2)
- Netherlands (3)
- Argentina (4)
- Germany (6)
- Great Britain (7)
- New Zealand (8)
- Spain (9)
- ~~Pakistan~~ (12)

== Results ==
=== Standings ===
Pos	Team	Pld	W	SOW	SOL	L	GF	GA	GD	Pts	Qualification
1	Australia	14	10	0	2	2	40	26	+14	32	Advance to Semi-finals (Note: As Australia and Belgium had already qualified for the 2020 Summer Olympics via their own continental qualification tournaments (EuroHockey Championship, Oceania Cup), the teams placed below them (Netherlands, Great Britain) replaced their position as qualifiers to the Summer Olympics.)
2	Belgium	14	8	1	2	3	52	29	+23	28	Advance to Semi-finals
3	Netherlands	14	5	3	2	4	37	32	+5	23	Advance to Semi-finals
4	Great Britain	14	6	1	2	5	35	31	+4	22	Advance to Semi-finals
5	Argentina	14	6	1	2	5	31	36	−5	22	
6	Germany	14	4	3	2	5	30	38	−8	20	
7	Spain	14	2	5	0	7	33	45	−12	16	
8	New Zealand	14	0	0	4	10	26	47	−21	4	
9	Pakistan (Note: Pakistan was suspended on 23 January 2019.)	0	0	0	0	0	0	0	0	0	Suspended

Source: FIH
Rules for classification: 1) points; 2) matches won; 3) goal difference; 4) goals for; 5) head-to-head result; 6) field goals scored.

=== Fixtures ===
All times are local.

19 January 2019
13:00

Spain	2–2	Belgium
Rodríguez 58'; González 60'	Report	Plennevaux 37'; Hendrickx 55'
Penalties
Romeu (penalty shoot-out scored); Iglesias (penalty shoot-out scored); Lleonart (penalty shoot-out missed); Enrique (penalty shoot-out missed)	2–0	(penalty shoot-out missed) Wegnez; (penalty shoot-out missed) Kina; (penalty shoot-out missed) De Sloover; (penalty shoot-out missed) Van Aubel

Estadio Beteró, Valencia
Umpires:
Christian Blasch (GER)
Martin Madden (SCO)

25 January 2019
11:00

Spain	5–6	Great Britain
Lleonart 2'; Boltó 7'; Arana 9'; Béltran 11'; Iglesias 58'	Report	Dixon 3', 41'; Wallace 22'; Gleghorne 40'; Roper 47'; Condon 57'

Estadio Beteró, Valencia
Umpires:
Marcin Grochal (POL)
Coen van Bunge (NED)

26 January 2019
18:15

Argentina	2–4	Belgium
Vila 21'; Martínez 51'	Report	Boon 3', 51'; Boccard 44'; Wegnez 45'

Estadio Municipal de Hockey, Córdoba
Umpires:
Simon Taylor (NZL)
Sean Rapaport (RSA)

27 January 2019
14:30

New Zealand	3–4	Netherlands
Inglis 16', 28'; Russell 30'	Report	Brinkman 9', 44'; De Geus 12'; Janssen 27'

North Harbor Hockey Stadium, Auckland
Umpires:
Adam Kearns (AUS)
Germán Montes de Oca (ARG)

1 February 2019
19:00

New Zealand	4–4	Belgium
Inglis 17'; Sarikaya 35'; Woods 51'; Jenness 52'	Report	Charlier 19', 46'; Plennevaux 27'; A. Van Doren 37'
Penalties
Inglis (penalty shoot-out missed); Tarrant (penalty shoot-out scored); Jenness (penalty shoot-out scored); Thomas (penalty shoot-out missed)	2–4	(penalty shoot-out scored) Van Aubel; (penalty shoot-out scored) Denayer; (penalty shoot-out scored) Wegnez; (penalty shoot-out scored) De Sloover

North Harbor Hockey Stadium, Auckland
Umpires:
Adam Kearns (AUS)
Germán Montes de Oca (ARG)

2 February 2019
15:00

Australia	5–5	Netherlands
Craig 3'; Brand 13'; Ockenden 17'; Mitton 23'; Sharp 35'	Report	Pruyser 4'; Hertzberger 29'; De Geus 47'; Bakker 51'; Kellerman 56'
Penalties
Govers (penalty shoot-out missed); Craig (penalty shoot-out missed); Hayward (penalty shoot-out scored)	1–4	(penalty shoot-out scored) Hertzberger; (penalty shoot-out scored) Schuurman; (penalty shoot-out scored) De Geus; (penalty shoot-out scored) Bakker

State Netball and Hockey Centre, Melbourne
Umpires:
Lim Hong-Zhen (SGP)
Simon Taylor (NZL)

3 February 2019
15:00

Australia	1–4	Belgium
Beale 1'	Report	Dockier 15', 35'; Hendrickx 28'; Cosyns 40'

State Netball and Hockey Centre, Melbourne
Umpires:
Lim Hong-Zhen (SGP)
Simon Taylor (NZL)

8 February 2019
17:00

New Zealand	2–6	Great Britain
Woods 43'; Inglis 44'	Report	Ward 18', 33', 46'; Roper 27', 40'; Dixon 29'

Nga Puna Wai Hockey Stadium, Christchurch
Umpires:
Sean Rapaport (RSA)
Adam Kearns (AUS)

10 February 2019
15:00

Australia	4–2	Germany
Anderson 12', 21'; Wickham 36'; Wotherspoon 48'	Report	Fuchs 5'; Windfeder 22'

Tasmanian Hockey Centre, Hobart
Umpires:
David Tomlinson (NZL)
Raghu Prasad (IND)

15 February 2019
11:00

Spain	3–3	Netherlands
Quemada 44'; Béltran 51'; Serrahima 60+'	Report	Brinkman 12'; Pruyser 14'; Galema 38'
Penalties
Iglesias (penalty shoot-out missed); Enrique (penalty shoot-out scored); Lleonart (penalty shoot-out scored); Béltran (penalty shoot-out missed); Romeu (penalty shoot-out scored)	3–1	(penalty shoot-out scored) Croon; (penalty shoot-out missed) Pruyser; (penalty shoot-out missed) Brinkman; (penalty shoot-out missed) Pieters

Estadio Beteró, Valencia
Umpires:
Martin Madden (SCO)
Diego Barbas (ARG)

15 February 2019
19:00

New Zealand	1–3	Germany
Tarrant 49'	Report	Miltkau 32', 56'; Wellen 40'

Nga Puna Wai Hockey Stadium, Christchurch
Umpires:
Eric Koh (MAS)
Sean Rapaport (RSA)

16 February 2019
15:30

Australia	2–0	Great Britain
Mitton 13'; Anderson 23'	Report

Perth Hockey Stadium, Perth
Umpires:
David Tomlinson (NZL)
Gareth Greenfield (NZL)

22 February 2019
21:00

Argentina	0–0	Germany
	Report

CeNARD, Buenos Aires
Umpires:
Francisco Vázquez (ESP)
Peter Wright (RSA)

Due to heavy rain and thunder the match was cancelled and considered a 0–0 draw.

24 February 2019
16:00

Argentina	4–3	Netherlands
Paredes 13', 31'; Vila 54', 58'	Report	Kellerman 8'; Hertzberger 14', 34'

CeNARD, Buenos Aires
Umpires:
Francisco Vázquez (ESP)
Peter Wright (RSA)

2 March 2019
15:00

Australia	2–1	Spain
Sharp 22'; Beale 47'	Report	Quemada 26'

Sydney Olympic Park Hockey Centre, Sydney
Umpires:
Simon Taylor (NZL)
Javed Shaikh (IND)

5 March 2019
18:45

Netherlands	0–1	Germany
	Report	Fuchs 45'

Hazelaarweg Stadion, Rotterdam
Umpires:
Bruce Bale (ENG)
Martin Madden (SCO)

8 March 2019
19:00

New Zealand	3–3	Spain
J. Panchia 22'; Jenness 34'; Thomas 38'	Report	Quemada 1', 53'; Miralles 53'
Penalties
Jenness (penalty shoot-out scored); Russell (penalty shoot-out missed); Thomas (penalty shoot-out scored); Phillips (penalty shoot-out missed)	2–4	(penalty shoot-out scored) Iglesias; (penalty shoot-out scored) Serrahima; (penalty shoot-out scored) Lleonart; (penalty shoot-out scored) Enrique

North Harbour Hockey Stadium, Auckland
Umpires:
Raghu Prasad (IND)
Lim Hong-Zhen (SGP)

10 March 2019
14:30

New Zealand	1–2	Argentina
Russell 52'	Report	Ferreiro 21'; Casella 48'

North Harbour Hockey Stadium, Auckland
Umpires:
Raghu Prasad (IND)
lim Hong-Zhen (SGP)

15 March 2019
11:00

Spain	4–4	Germany
Iglesias 6'; Ruiz 36'; Lleonart 47'; Quemada 49'	Report	Windfeder 14'; M. Grambusch 35'; Häner 48'; Röthlander 55'
Penalties
Iglesias (penalty shoot-out scored); Béltran (penalty shoot-out scored); Lleonart (penalty shoot-out scored); Enrique (penalty shoot-out missed); Romeu (penalty shoot-out scored)	4–3	(penalty shoot-out scored) Wellen; (penalty shoot-out missed) Prinz; (penalty shoot-out scored) Große; (penalty shoot-out scored) Linnekogel; (penalty shoot-out missed) M. Grambusch

Estadio Beteró, Valencia
Umpires:
Bruce Bale (ENG)
Jakub Mejzlík (CZE)

16 March 2019
15:00

Australia	3–2	Argentina
Hayward 11', 15'; Govers 30'	Report	Casella 42'; Catán 51'

Sydney Olympic Park Hockey Centre, Sydney
Umpires:
Peter Wright (RSA)
Raghu Prasad (IND)

17 March 2019
15:00

Australia	5–1	New Zealand
Wickham 12', 32'; Hayward 14'; Welch 27'; Beale 38'	Report	Phillips 15'

Sydney Olympic Park Hockey Centre, Sydney
Umpires:
Peter Wright (RSA)
Raghu Prasad (IND)

31 March 2019
18:00

Argentina	3–2	Spain
Paredes 45'; Toscani 53'; Casella 55'	Report	González 15'; Sánchez 21'

Estadio Mundialista Luciana Aymar, Rosario
Umpires:
Jakub Mejzlík (CZE)
Ben Göntgen (GER)

6 April 2019
15:30

Argentina	1–5	Great Britain
Paredes 42'	Report	Forsyth 20', 56'; Ward 26'; Roper 38', 58'

Estadio Mundialista Luciana Aymar, Rosario
Umpires:
Jakub Mejzlík (CZE)
Ben Göntgen (GER)

10 April 2019
20:30

Belgium	7–3	Spain
Van Aubel 12', 17'; Boon 15', 19'; Charlier 18'; Denayer 28'; A. Van Doren 33'	Report	Quemada 46', 60'; González 57'

Royal Uccle Sport, Brussels
Umpires:
Christian Blasch (GER)
Dan Barstow (ENG)

13 April 2019
18:00

Netherlands	4–0	Spain
Bovendeert 33'; Pruyser 41'; Balk 50'; Lodewijks 59'	Report

Hazelaarweg Stadion, Rotterdam
Umpires:
Diego Barbas (ARG)
Marcin Grochal (POL)

13 April 2019
18:00

Argentina	4–3	New Zealand
Paredes 2'; Casella 9'; Ferreiro 15'; Fernández 27'	Report	Lane 15', 22'; Muir 47'

Estadio Mundialista Luciana Aymar, Rosario
Umpires:
Ben Göntgen (GER)
Sean Rapaport (RSA)

25 April 2019
16:30

New Zealand	3–4	Australia
Muir 29'; J. Panchia 37'; Wilcox 59'	Report	Craig 14'; Ogilvie 15'; Govers 41', 50'

North Harbor Hockey Stadium, Auckland
Umpires:
Peter Wright (RSA)
Javed Shaikh (IND)

26 April 2019
20:30

Germany	2–4	Netherlands
Hellwig 9'; Windfeder 23'	Report	Van der Weerden 5', 52'; Lodewijks 26'; Kellerman 60'

Hockeypark, Mönchengladbach
Umpires:
Germán Montes de Oca (ARG)
Eric Koh (MAS)

28 April 2019
14:00

Germany	0–1	Great Britain
	Report	Roper 38'

Hockeypark, Mönchengladbach
Umpires:
Germán Montes de Oca (ARG)
Eric Koh (MAS)

4 May 2019
12:00

Great Britain	1–1	Spain
Ward 18'	Report	Quemada 1'
Penalties
Roper (penalty shoot-out scored); Martin (penalty shoot-out missed); Waller (penalty shoot-out scored); Wallace (penalty shoot-out missed); Forsyth (penalty shoot-out missed); Roper (penalty shoot-out missed)	2–3	(penalty shoot-out missed) Iglesias; (penalty shoot-out missed) Serrahima; (penalty shoot-out missed) González; (penalty shoot-out scored) Enrique; (penalty shoot-out scored) Romeu; (penalty shoot-out scored) Enrique

Lee Valley Hockey and Tennis Centre, London
Umpires:
Rawi Anbananthan (MAS)
Sean Rapaport (RSA)

4 May 2019
18:30

Argentina	1–2	Australia
Casella 52'	Report	Govers 15'; Weyer 40'

CeNARD, Buenos Aires
Umpires:
Gareth Greenfield (NZL)
Coen van Bunge (NED)

18 May 2019
15:00

Great Britain	2–3	Argentina
Ward 56'; Forsyth 58'	Report	Ferreiro 19'; Ortiz 36'; Casella 42'

Lee Valley Hockey and Tennis Centre, London
Umpires:
Francisco Vázquez (ESP)
Jonas van 't Hek (NED)

19 May 2019
15:00

Great Britain	0–4	Belgium
	Report	Van Aubel 13'; Dohmen 39', 57'; Briels 43'

Lee Valley Hockey and Tennis Centre, London
Umpires:
Francisco Vázquez (ESP)
Jonas van 't Hek (NED)

22 May 2019
20:30

Germany	3–3	Argentina
Herzbruch 5'; Häner 33'; Staib 56'	Report	Tolini 33'; Ortiz 43'; Mazzilli 48'
Penalties
Wellen (penalty shoot-out scored); Herzbruch (penalty shoot-out scored); Linnekogel (penalty shoot-out scored); Prinz (penalty shoot-out scored); Hellwig (penalty shoot-out scored); Wellen (penalty shoot-out scored)	6–5	(penalty shoot-out scored) Keenan; (penalty shoot-out scored) Vila; (penalty shoot-out scored) Mazzilli; (penalty shoot-out scored) Ortiz; (penalty shoot-out scored) Rey; (penalty shoot-out missed) Rey

Gerd-Wellen-Hockeystadion, Krefeld
Umpires:
Martin Madden (SCO)
Rawi Anbananthan (MAS)

30 May 2019
13:30

Belgium	4–2	Great Britain
Charlier 9', 19'; Boon 15'; Hendrickx 20'	Report	Roper 38'; Taylor 47'

Wilrijkse Plein Antwerp, Antwerp
Umpires:
Jonas van 't Hek (NED)
Christian Blasch (GER)

2 June 2019
13:30

Belgium	4–4	Germany
Cosyns 21', 54'; Gougnard 29'; Hendrickx 55'	Report	T. Grambusch 8', 30+'; Wellen 42'; Miltkau 45'
Penalties
Briels (penalty shoot-out scored); Wegnez (penalty shoot-out scored); Van Aubel (penalty shoot-out missed); De Sloover (penalty shoot-out missed); Cosyns (penalty shoot-out scored)	3–4	(penalty shoot-out scored) Wellen; (penalty shoot-out scored) Fuchs; (penalty shoot-out scored) Linnekogel; (penalty shoot-out missed) Hellwig; (penalty shoot-out scored) Große

Wilrijkse Plein Antwerp, Antwerp
Umpires:
Dan Barstow (ENG)
Martin Madden (SCO)

2 June 2019
16:00

Netherlands	1–3	Great Britain
Van der Weerden 12'	Report	Calnan 10'; Ward 45'; Griffiths 46'

Sportpark Aalsterweg, Eindhoven
Umpires:
Jakub Mejzlík (CZE)
Ben Göntgen (GER)

4 June 2019
20:00

Netherlands	0–0	New Zealand
	Report
Penalties
Croon (penalty shoot-out scored); Brinkman (penalty shoot-out scored); De Geus (penalty shoot-out scored); Pieters (penalty shoot-out missed)	3–2	(penalty shoot-out scored) Inglis; (penalty shoot-out missed) Jenness; (penalty shoot-out scored) McAleese; (penalty shoot-out missed) Smith; (penalty shoot-out missed) Child

Sportpark Aalsterweg, Eindhoven
Umpires:
Bruce Bale (ENG)
Francisco Vázquez (ESP)

6 June 2019
19:30

Great Britain	3–4	Germany
Calnan 10'; Roper 21'; Ward 35'	Report	Große 28'; Fuchs 32'; Miltkau 51'; Herzbruch 58'

Lee Valley Hockey and Tennis Centre, London
Umpires:
Coen van Bunge (NED)
Marcin Grochal (POL)

8 June 2019
13:30

Belgium	0–4	Netherlands
	Report	Kellerman 37', 48'; De Voogd 55'; Hertzberger 60'

Wilrijkse Plein Antwerp, Antwerp
Umpires:
Martin Madden (SCO)
Francisco Vázquez (ESP)

9 June 2019
14:00

Great Britain	2–2	Australia
Wallace 7'; Griffiths 25'	Report	Harvie 12'; Brand 36'
Penalties
Martin (penalty shoot-out scored); Dixon (penalty shoot-out scored); Roper (penalty shoot-out scored); Ames (penalty shoot-out scored); Forsyth (penalty shoot-out missed)	4–3	(penalty shoot-out scored) Zalewski; (penalty shoot-out missed) Govers; (penalty shoot-out scored) Ogilvie; (penalty shoot-out scored) Craig; (penalty shoot-out missed) Beale

Lee Valley Hockey and Tennis Centre, London
Umpires:
Christian Blasch (GER)
Coen van Bunge (NED)

9 June 2019
14:00

Germany	3–3	New Zealand
Herzbruch 19'; Oruz 31'; T. Grambusch 58'	Report	Jenness 3'; Woods 16'; Lane 40'
Penalties
Miltkau (penalty shoot-out missed); Herzbruch (penalty shoot-out scored); Wellen (penalty shoot-out scored); Große (penalty shoot-out missed); M. Grambusch (penalty shoot-out scored); M. Grambusch (penalty shoot-out scored)	4–3	(penalty shoot-out scored) Inglis; (penalty shoot-out scored) Jenness; (penalty shoot-out scored) J. Panchia; (penalty shoot-out missed) McAleese; (penalty shoot-out missed) Smith; (penalty shoot-out missed) Inglis

Gerd-Wellen-Hockeystadion, Krefeld
Umpires:
Dan Barstow (ENG)
Jonas van 't Hek (NED)

9 June 2019
16:00

Netherlands	4–3	Belgium
Pruyser 24'; Janssen 29'; Van der Weerden 33'; Hertzberger 38'	Report	Dockier 9'; Boon 24', 46'

HC Den Bosch, 's-Hertogenbosch
Umpires:
Marcin Grochal (POL)
Jakub Mejzlík (CZE)

10 June 2019
18:30

Germany	3–1	Spain
Staib 11'; Wellen 15'; Herzbruch 59'	Report	Romeu 14'

Gerd-Wellen-Hockeystadion, Krefeld
Umpires:
Raghu Prasad (IND)
Jonas van 't Hek (NED)

12 June 2019
20:30

Germany	0–8	Belgium
	Report	Hendrickx 20', 45'; Dockier 22', 30'; Boon 52'; Charlier 53', 55'; Wegnez 55'

Gerd-Wellen-Hockeystadion, Krefeld
Umpires:
Raghu Prasad (IND)
Coen van Bunge (NED)

13 June 2019
19:00

Spain	3–2	Australia
Romeu 28', 60'; Lleonart 44'	Report	Brand 3'; Govers 58'

Club de Campo Villa de Madrid, Madrid
Umpires:
Christian Blasch (GER)
Martin Madden (SCO)

14 June 2019
19:00

Spain	3–2	New Zealand
González 36'; Boltó 43'; Quemada 51'	Report	Inglis 50'; Russell 55'

Club de Campo Villa de Madrid, Madrid
Umpires:
Christian Blasch (GER)
Coen van Bunge (NED)

14 June 2019
19:30

Great Britain	2–2	Netherlands
Griffiths 38'; Forsyth 60'	Report	Hertzberger 20', 51'
Penalties
Forsyth (penalty shoot-out missed); Roper (penalty shoot-out scored); Jackson (penalty shoot-out scored); Ames (penalty shoot-out scored); Dixon (penalty shoot-out missed)	3–4	(penalty shoot-out scored) Croon; (penalty shoot-out scored) Pruyser; (penalty shoot-out missed) De Geus; (penalty shoot-out scored) Hertzberger; (penalty shoot-out scored) Van Ass

Lee Valley Hockey and Tennis Centre, London
Umpires:
Jakub Mejzlík (CZE)
Marcin Grochal (POL)

16 June 2019
13:00

Spain	2–3	Argentina
Rodríguez 2'; Quemada 26'	Report	Tolini 35', 60+'; López 41'

Club de Campo Villa de Madrid, Madrid
Umpires:
David Tomlinson (NZL)
Martin Madden (SCO)

16 June 2019
14:30

Germany	1–2	Australia
Miltkau 59'	Report	Craig 42'; Govers 52'

Gerd-Wellen-Hockeystadion, Krefeld
Umpires:
Jonas van 't Hek (NED)
Francisco Vázquez (ESP)

16 June 2019
14:30

Belgium	4–0	New Zealand
Dockier 7'; Plennevaux 43'; Briels 56', 56'	Report

Wilrijkse Plein Antwerp, Antwerp
Umpires:
Ben Göntgen (GER)
Javed Shaikh (IND)

19 June 2019
20:30

Belgium	0–2	Australia
	Report	Govers 19', 60'

Wilrijkse Plein Antwerp, Antwerp
Umpires:
Bruce Bale (ENG)
Javed Shaikh (IND)

19 June 2019
21:10

Netherlands	2–2	Argentina
Pruyser 17', 41'	Report	Tolini 23'; Mazzilli 51'
Penalties
Croon (penalty shoot-out scored); De Geus (penalty shoot-out missed); Hertzberger (penalty shoot-out scored); Van Ass (penalty shoot-out missed)	2–4	(penalty shoot-out scored) Keenan; (penalty shoot-out missed) Vila; (penalty shoot-out scored) Mazzilli; (penalty shoot-out scored) Ferreiro; (penalty shoot-out scored) Ortiz

De Klapperboom, Utrecht
Umpires:
Francisco Vázquez (ESP)
Ben Göntgen (GER)

22 June 2019
17:00

Netherlands	1–4	Australia
Janssen 7'	Report	Govers 5', 18'; Hayward 14', 45+'

Wagener Stadium, Amstelveen
Umpires:
Simon Taylor (NZL)
Peter Wright (RSA)

23 June 2019
13:30

Belgium	4–1	Argentina
Charlier 1', 34'; Plennevaux 13'; Denayer 43'	Report	Ortiz 55'

Wilrijkse Plein Antwerp, Antwerp
Umpires:
Coen van Bunge (NED)
Jonas van 't Hek (NED)

23 June 2019
14:00

Great Britain	2–0	New Zealand
Griffiths 6'; Forsyth 52'	Report

Twickenham Stoop, London
Umpires:
Francisco Vázquez (ESP)
Christian Blasch (GER)

=== Grand Final ===
Semi-finals
28 June
Australia	6
Great Britain	1
28 June
Belgium	3
Netherlands	1

Final
30 June
Australia	3
Belgium	2
Third place
30 June
Great Britain	3
Netherlands	5

==== Semi-finals ====
28 June 2019
17:15

Australia	6–1	Great Britain
Anderson 11', 12', 16'; Hayward 32'; Govers 36'; Brand 52'	Report	Jackson 5'

Wagener Stadium, Amstelveen
Umpires:
Coen van Bunge (NED)
Peter Wright (RSA)

28 June 2019
20:00

Belgium	3–1	Netherlands
Cosyns 18'; Boon 44'; Hendrickx 50'	Report	Galema 26'

Wagener Stadium, Amstelveen
Umpires:
Christian Blasch (GER)
Simon Taylor (NZL)

==== Third place game ====
30 June 2019
14:30

Great Britain	3–5	Netherlands
Wallace 24'; Weir 27'; Roper 29'	Report	Hertzberger 9', 29'; Van der Weerden 30'; Pruyser 40', 45'

Wagener Stadium, Amstelveen
Umpires:
Christian Blasch (GER)
Simon Taylor (NZL)

==== Final ====
30 June 2019
17:00

Australia	3–2	Belgium
Mitton 9'; Ogilvie 14'; Govers 29'	Report	Luypaert 44'; Hendrickx 58'

Wagener Stadium, Amstelveen
Umpires:
Marcin Grochal (POL)
Coen van Bunge (NED)

== Statistics ==
=== Final standings ===
Pos	Team	Pld	W	SOW	SOL	L	GF	GA	GD	Pts	Final standing
1st place, gold medalist(s)	Australia	16	12	0	2	2	49	29	+20	38	Gold Medal
2nd place, silver medalist(s)	Belgium	16	9	1	2	4	57	33	+24	31	Silver Medal
3rd place, bronze medalist(s)	Netherlands	16	6	3	2	5	43	38	+5	26	Bronze Medal
4	Great Britain	16	6	1	2	7	39	42	−3	22	Fourth place
5	Argentina	14	6	1	2	5	31	36	−5	22	Eliminated in group stage
6	Germany	14	4	3	2	5	30	38	−8	20	Eliminated in group stage
7	Spain	14	2	5	0	7	33	45	−12	16	Eliminated in group stage
8	New Zealand	14	0	0	4	10	26	47	−21	4	Eliminated in group stage

Source: FIH
Rules for classification: 1) points; 2) matches won; 3) goal difference; 4) goals for; 5) head-to-head result; 6) field goals scored.

=== Awards ===
Player of the League	Top Goalscorer	Goalkeeper of the Grand Final	Goal of the Grand Final
(Australia) Aran Zalewski	(Australia) Blake Govers	(Australia) Tyler Lovell	(Belgium) Tom Boon

=== Goalscorers ===
There were 308 goals scored in 60 matches, for an average of 5.13 goals per match.

12 goals

- (Australia) Blake Govers

10 goals

- (Spain) Pau Quemada

9 goals

- (Belgium) Tom Boon
- (Belgium) Cédric Charlier
- (United Kingdom) Phil Roper
- (Netherlands) Jeroen Hertzberger

8 goals

- (Belgium) Alexander Hendrickx
- (United Kingdom) Samuel Ward
- (Netherlands) Mirco Pruyser

6 goals

- (Argentina) Maico Casella
- (Australia) Jacob Anderson
- (Australia) Jeremy Hayward
- (Belgium) Sébastien Dockier

5 goals

- (Argentina) Matías Paredes
- (Germany) Marco Miltkau
- (United Kingdom) Alan Forsyth
- (Netherlands) Bjorn Kellerman
- (Netherlands) Mink van der Weerden
- (New Zealand) Hugo Inglis

4 goals

- (Argentina) Leandro Tolini
- (Australia) Timothy Brand
- (Belgium) Tanguy Cosyns
- (Belgium) Maxime Plennevaux
- (Germany) Timm Herzbruch
- (United Kingdom) Chris Griffiths
- (Spain) Enrique González

3 goals

- (Argentina) Martín Ferreiro
- (Argentina) Ignacio Ortiz
- (Argentina) Lucas Vila
- (Australia) Daniel Beale
- (Australia) Tom Craig
- (Australia) Trent Mitton
- (Australia) Tom Wickham
- (Belgium) Florent van Aubel
- (Belgium) Thomas Briels
- (Germany) Florian Fuchs
- (Germany) Tom Grambusch
- (Germany) Niklas Wellen
- (Germany) Lukas Windfeder
- (United Kingdom) Adam Dixon
- (United Kingdom) Zachary Wallace
- (Netherlands) Thierry Brinkman
- (Netherlands) Jip Janssen
- (New Zealand) Stephen Jenness
- (New Zealand) Sam Lane
- (New Zealand) Kane Russell
- (New Zealand) Nic Woods
- (Spain) Xavi Lleonart
- (Spain) Josep Romeu

2 goals

- (Argentina) Agustín Mazzilli
- (Australia) Flynn Ogilvie
- (Australia) Lachlan Sharp
- (Belgium) Félix Denayer
- (Belgium) John-John Dohmen
- (Belgium) Arthur Van Doren
- (Belgium) Victor Wegnez
- (Germany) Martin Häner
- (Germany) Constantin Staib
- (United Kingdom) Will Calnan
- (Netherlands) Jelle Galema
- (Netherlands) Jonas de Geus
- (Netherlands) Arjen Lodewijks
- (New Zealand) George Muir
- (New Zealand) Jared Panchia
- (Spain) Albert Béltran
- (Spain) Marc Boltó
- (Spain) Álvaro Iglesias
- (Spain) Ignacio Rodríguez

1 goal

- (Argentina) Juan Catán
- (Argentina) Federico Fernández
- (Argentina) Juan Martín López
- (Argentina) Lucas Martínez
- (Argentina) Lucas Toscani
- (Australia) Jake Harvie
- (Australia) Eddie Ockenden
- (Australia) Jack Welch
- (Australia) Corey Weyer
- (Australia) Dylan Wotherspoon
- (Belgium) Gauthier Boccard
- (Belgium) Simon Gougnard
- (Belgium) Loïck Luypaert
- (Germany) Mats Grambusch
- (Germany) Johannes Große
- (Germany) Malte Hellwig
- (Germany) Timur Oruz
- (Germany) Moritz Röthlander
- (United Kingdom) David Condon
- (United Kingdom) Mark Gleghorne
- (United Kingdom) Ashley Jackson
- (United Kingdom) Luke Taylor
- (United Kingdom) Henry Weir
- (Netherlands) Billy Bakker
- (Netherlands) Lars Balk
- (Netherlands) Roel Bovendeert
- (Netherlands) Bob de Voogd
- (New Zealand) Hayden Phillips
- (New Zealand) Aidan Sarikaya
- (New Zealand) Blair Tarrant
- (New Zealand) Dylan Thomas
- (New Zealand) Mackenzie Wilcox
- (Spain) Diego Arana
- (Spain) Marc Miralles
- (Spain) Viçens Ruiz
- (Spain) Ricardo Sánchez
- (Spain) Marc Serrahima

Source: FIH

== See also ==
- 2019 Women's FIH Pro League
- 2018–19 Men's Hockey Series
