= 2016–17 Men's FIH Hockey World League Semifinals =

Field hockey tournament

Tournament details
- Dates: 15 June – 23 July 2017
- Teams: 20 (from 5 confederations)
- Venue: 2 (in 2 host cities)

Tournament statistics
- Matches played: 66
- Goals scored: 327 (4.95 per match)
- Top scorer: (Argentina) Gonzalo Peillat (12 goals)

The 2016–17 Men's FIH Hockey World League Semifinals were the third stage of the 2016–17 edition of the Men's FIH Hockey World League. It took place in June and July 2017. A total of 20 teams competed in 2 events in this round of the tournament playing for 7 berths in the Final, to be played between 2 and 10 December 2017 in Bhubaneswar, India.

This round also served as a qualifier for the 2018 Men's Hockey World Cup as the 10/11 highest placed teams apart from the host nation and the five continental champions qualified.

== Qualification ==
11 teams ranked between 1st and 11th in the FIH World Rankings current at the time of seeking entries for the competition qualified automatically, in addition to 8 teams qualified from Round 2 and one nation that did not meet ranking criteria and was exempt from Round 2 to host a Semifinal. The following twenty teams, shown with final pre-tournament rankings, competed in this round of the tournament.

Dates	Event	Location	Quotas	Qualifier(s)
	Ranked 1st to 11th in the FIH World Rankings		11	Australia (2); Netherlands (4); Germany (3); England (7); Belgium (5); Argentina (1); India (6); New Zealand (8); South Korea (12); Pakistan (13); Spain (10)
	Host Nation		1	South Africa (15)
4–12 March 2017	2016–17 FIH Hockey World League Round 2	Dhaka, Bangladesh	3	Malaysia (14); China (18); Egypt (19)
11–19 March 2017	2016–17 FIH Hockey World League Round 2	Belfast, Ireland	3	Ireland (9); France (17); Scotland (23)
25 March–2 April 2017	2016–17 FIH Hockey World League Round 2	Tunapuna, Trinidad and Tobago	2	Japan (16); Canada (11)
Total			20	

== London ==

Tournament details
- Host country: England
- City: London
- Dates: 15–25 June 2017
- Teams: 10
- Venue: Lee Valley Hockey and Tennis Centre

Final positions
- Champions: Netherlands
- Runner-up: Argentina
- Third place: England

Tournament statistics
- Matches played: 33
- Goals scored: 177 (5.36 per match)
- Top scorer: (Argentina) Gonzalo Peillat (12 goals)
- Best player: (Argentina) Gonzalo Peillat

All times are local (UTC+1).

=== First round ===
==== Pool A ====
Pos	Team	Pld	W	D	L	GF	GA	GD	Pts	Qualification
1	Argentina	4	3	1	0	20	6	+14	10	Quarter-finals
2	England (H)	4	3	1	0	19	8	+11	10	Quarter-finals
3	Malaysia	4	2	0	2	11	13	−2	6	Quarter-finals
4	China	4	1	0	3	6	19	−13	3	Quarter-finals
5	South Korea	4	0	0	4	5	15	−10	0	Ninth place game

Source: FIH
Rules for classification: 1) points; 2) goal difference; 3) goals scored; 4) head-to-head result.
(H) Hosts

15 June 2017
12:00

South Korea	1–2	Argentina
Lee N. 46'	Report	Peillat 26', 53'

Umpires:
David Tomlinson (NZL)
Paul Walker (ENG)

15 June 2017
20:00

England	2–0	China
Middleton 11'; Gleghorne 11'	Report

Umpires:
Ayden Shrives (RSA)
Andrés Ortiz (ESP)

16 June 2017
20:00

Argentina	5–2	Malaysia
Peillat 4', 11', 40', 47'; Callioni 49'	Report	Shahril 7'; Ahmad 18'

Umpires:
Ayden Shrives (RSA)
Simon Taylor (NZL)

17 June 2017
12:00

China	5–2	South Korea
Su L. 3'; Su J. 5', 15'; E L. 44'; Guo Z. 60'	Report	Yang 10'; Hwang 40'

Umpires:
Coen van Bunge (NED)
Andrés Ortiz (ESP)

17 June 2017
16:00

England	7–3	Malaysia
Middleton 5', 34'; Griffiths 8'; Ward 32', 51'; Gleghorne 39', 55'	Report	Faizal 19', 57'; Ahmad 28'

Umpires:
Gregory Uyttenhove (BEL)
Lim Hong Zhen (SIN)

18 June 2017
16:00

England	3–3	Argentina
Gleghorne 6'; Ward 9'; Middleton 34'	Report	Peillat 37', 41'; Paredes 40'

Umpires:
David Tomlinson (NZL)
Coen van Bunge (NED)

19 June 2017
18:00

South Korea	0–1	Malaysia
	Report	Razie 35'

Umpires:
You Suolong (CHN)
Coen van Bunge (NED)

19 June 2017
20:00

Argentina	10–0	China
Peillat 1', 15', 38'; Vila 17', 55'; Paredes 30'; Tolini 33'; Brunet 42'; Bugallo 54'; López 59'	Report

Umpires:
Simon Taylor (NZL)
Eric Koh (MAS)

20 June 2017
18:00

China	1–5	Malaysia
Du T. 43'	Report	Faizal 2'; Najmi 12'; Razie 19', 27'; Fitri 51'

Umpires:
Lim Hong Zhen (SIN)
Andrés Ortiz (ESP)

20 June 2017
20:00

England	7–2	South Korea
Ward 6', 34', 36', 60'; Ames 17'; Roper 50', 60'	Report	Jang 22'; Lee D. 32'

Umpires:
Eric Koh (MAS)
Coen van Bunge (NED)

==== Pool B ====
Pos	Team	Pld	W	D	L	GF	GA	GD	Pts	Qualification
1	Netherlands	4	4	0	0	13	2	+11	12	Quarter-finals
2	India	4	3	0	1	15	5	+10	9	Quarter-finals
3	Canada	4	1	1	2	8	7	+1	4	Quarter-finals
4	Pakistan	4	1	0	3	4	18	−14	3	Quarter-finals
5	Scotland	4	0	1	3	3	11	−8	1	Ninth place game

Source: FIH
Rules for classification: 1) points; 2) goal difference; 3) goals scored; 4) head-to-head result.

15 June 2017
14:00

India	4–1	Scotland
R. Singh 31', 34'; A. Singh 40'; Harm. Singh 42'	Report	Grassick 6'

Umpires:
Coen van Bunge (NED)
Lim Hong Zhen (SIN)

15 June 2017
18:00

Netherlands	4–0	Pakistan
Brinkman 6'; Pruyser 26'; Van der Weerden 42'; Kemperman 49'	Report

Umpires:
Gregory Uyttenhove (BEL)
Eric Koh (MAS)

16 June 2017
18:00

Pakistan	0–6	Canada
	Report	Tupper 11'; Smythe 19', 27'; Van Son 28'; Bissett 50'; Johnston 60+'

Umpires:
Lim Hong Zhen (SIN)
You Suolong (CHN)

17 June 2017
14:00

Canada	0–3	India
	Report	S. V. Sunil 5'; A. Singh 10'; Sar. Singh 18'

Umpires:
David Tomlinson (NZL)
Paul Walker (ENG)

17 June 2017
18:00

Scotland	0–3	Netherlands
	Report	Kemperman 15'; Van der Weerden 36'; Verger 51'

Umpires:
Eric Koh (MAS)
You Suolong (CHN)

18 June 2017
14:00

Pakistan	1–7	India
Bhutta 57'	Report	Harm. Singh 13', 33'; T. Singh 21', 24'; A. Singh 47', 59'; Mor 49'

Umpires:
Simon Taylor (NZL)
Lim Hong Zhen (SIN)

19 June 2017
12:00

Scotland	1–3	Pakistan
Adams 13'	Report	Irfan 34'; Qadir 42'; Bilal 46'

Umpires:
Andrés Ortiz (ESP)
David Tomlinson (NZL)

19 June 2017
14:00

Netherlands	3–1	Canada
Van der Weerden 13'; Croon 36'; Pruyser 53'	Report	Tupper 30'

Umpires:
Paul Walker (ENG)
Gregory Uyttenhove (BEL)

20 June 2017
12:00

Scotland	1–1	Canada
Marshall 42'	Report	Johnston 29'

Umpires:
Gregory Uyttenhove (BEL)
You Suolong (CHN)

20 June 2017
14:00

India	1–3	Netherlands
A. Singh 28'	Report	Brinkman 2'; Baart 12'; Pruyser 24'

Umpires:
David Tomlinson (NZL)
Paul Walker (ENG)

=== Second round ===
Quarter-finals
22 June
Argentina	3
Pakistan	1
22 June
India	2
Malaysia	3
22 June
England	4
Canada	2
22 June
Netherlands	7
China	0

Semi-finals
24 June
Argentina	2
Malaysia	1
24 June
England	0
Netherlands	2

Final
25 June
Argentina	1
Netherlands	6
Third place
25 June
Malaysia	1
England	4

==== Quarter-finals ====
22 June 2017
13:15

Argentina	3–1	Pakistan
Casella 22', 44'; Peillat 33'	Report	Shan 49'

Umpires:
Coen van Bunge (NED)
Eric Koh (MAS)

22 June 2017
15:30

India	2–3	Malaysia
R. Singh 24', 26'	Report	Razie 19', 48'; Ahmad 20'

Umpires:
David Tomlinson (NZL)
Andrés Ortiz (ESP)

22 June 2017
17:45

Netherlands	7–0	China
Kemperman 24'; De Geus 25'; Pruyser 45', 60'; Bakker 47'; Kellerman 51'; Algera 58'	Report

Umpires:
Paul Walker (ENG)
Lim Hong Zhen (SIN)

22 June 2017
20:00

England	4–2	Canada
Middleton 13'; Gleghorne 24'; Goodfield 38'; Ward 57'	Report	J. Smythe 9'; Johnston 12'

Umpires:
Simon Taylor (NZL)
Gregory Uyttenhove (BEL)

==== Ninth and tenth place ====
22 June 2017
11:00

South Korea	6–3	Scotland
Bae 11'; Yang 14'; Jang 26'; Jeong 39'; Lee J. 45'; Hwang W. 48'	Report	Atkins 3'; Bain 54', 59'

Umpires:
Simon Taylor (NZL)
You Suolong (CHN)

==== Fifth to eighth place classification ====
Crossover
24 June
Pakistan	1
India	6
24 June
Canada	7
China	3

Fifth place
25 June
India	2
Canada	3
Seventh place
25 June
Pakistan	3
China	1

===== Crossover =====
24 June 2017
09:30

Canada	7–3	China
Sarmento 14'; Tupper 22', 45', 52'; Pearson 33'; Van Son 35'; Pereira 37'	Report	E W. 8'; Meng 19'; Wo 39'

Umpires:
Coen van Bunge (NED)
Paul Walker (ENG)

24 June 2017
11:45

Pakistan	1–6	India
Ahmad 41'	Report	R. Singh 8', 28'; T. Singh 25'; A. Singh 27'; Harm. Singh 36'; M. Singh 59'

Umpires:
Eric Koh (MAS)
Simon Taylor (NZL)

===== Seventh and eighth place =====
25 June 2017
09:30

Pakistan	3–1	China
Bhutta 51', 56'; Irfan 56'	Report	Guo X. 58'

Umpires:
Paul Walker (ENG)
Andrés Ortiz (ESP)

===== Fifth and sixth place =====
25 June 2017
11:45

India	2–3	Canada
Harm. Singh 7', 22'	Report	Johnston 3', 44'; Pereira 44'

Umpires:
You Suolong (CHN)
Coen van Bunge (NED)

==== First to fourth place classification ====
===== Semi-finals =====
24 June 2017
14:00

Argentina	2–1	Malaysia
Vila 13'; Brunet 34'	Report	Fitri 38'

Umpires:
Gregory Uyttenhove (BEL)
Andrés Ortiz (ESP)

24 June 2017
16:15

England	0–2	Netherlands
	Report	Pruyser 45'; Kellerman 48'

Umpires:
David Tomlinson (NZL)
Lim Hong Zhen (SIN)

===== Third and fourth place =====
25 June 2017
14:00

Malaysia	1–4	England
Faizal 53'	Report	Martin 5', 28'; Ames 9'; Roper 59'

Umpires:
David Tomlinson (NZL)
Lim Hong Zhen (SIN)

===== Final =====
25 June 2017
16:15

Argentina	1–6	Netherlands
Paredes 58'	Report	Verga 4', 14'; Van Dam 27'; Kemperman 33'; Pruyser 35'; Brinkman 58'

Umpires:
Simon Taylor (NZL)
Eric Koh (MAS)

=== Awards ===
Top Goalscorer	Player of the Tournament	Goalkeeper of the Tournament	Young Player of the Tournament
(Argentina) Gonzalo Peillat	(Argentina) Gonzalo Peillat	(Malaysia) Kumar Subramaniam	(Netherlands) Thierry Brinkman

== Johannesburg ==

Tournament details
- Host country: South Africa
- City: Johannesburg
- Dates: 8–23 July 2017
- Teams: 10
- Venue: University of Witwatersrand

Final positions
- Champions: Belgium
- Runner-up: Germany
- Third place: Australia

Tournament statistics
- Matches played: 33
- Goals scored: 150 (4.55 per match)
- Top scorer: (Belgium) Tom Boon (7 goals)
- Best player: (Germany) Mats Grambusch

All times are local (UTC+2).

=== First round ===
==== Pool A ====
Pos	Team	Pld	W	D	L	GF	GA	GD	Pts	Qualification
1	Australia	4	4	0	0	14	5	+9	12	Quarter-finals
2	Spain	4	3	0	1	8	6	+2	9	Quarter-finals
3	New Zealand	4	1	1	2	10	10	0	4	Quarter-finals
4	France	4	1	1	2	9	9	0	4	Quarter-finals
5	Japan	4	0	0	4	5	16	−11	0	Ninth place game

Source: FIH
Rules for classification: 1) points; 2) goal difference; 3) goals scored; 4) head-to-head result.

9 July 2017
12:00

New Zealand	3–3	France
Jenness 3'; Inglis 26', 32'	Report	Tynevez 5'; Goyet 17'; Van Straaten 44'

Umpires:
John Wright (RSA)
Grant Hundley (USA)

9 July 2017
14:00

Spain	2–1	Japan
Romeu 39'; Iglesias 49'	Report	Yamada 33'

Umpires:
Sebastien Duterme (BEL)
Raghu Prasad (IND)

11 July 2017
14:00

Australia	3–2	France
Whetton 18'; Pollard 51'; Knowles 53'	Report	Charlet 7'; Van Straaten 8'

Umpires:
Dave Dowdall (ENG)
Gabriel Labate (ARG)

11 July 2017
16:00

New Zealand	3–1	Japan
Panchia 18'; Woods 28'; Jenness 35'	Report	Zendana 59'

Umpires:
Haider Rasool (PAK)
Peter Wright (RSA)

13 July 2017
14:00

Japan	1–4	France
Wakuri 24'	Report	Tynevez 10'; Baumgarten 21'; Goyet 44'; Rogeau 55'

Umpires:
John Wright (RSA)
Roel van Eert (NED)

13 July 2017
16:00

Spain	0–2	Australia
	Report	Wotherspoon 53'; Mitton 60'

Umpires:
Gareth Greenfield (NZL)
Grant Hundley (USA)

15 July 2017
12:00

France	0–2	Spain
	Report	Quemada 45'; González 59'

Umpires:
Peter Wright (RSA)
Dave Dowdall (ENG)

15 July 2017
14:00

New Zealand	1–2	Australia
Panchia 39'	Report	Edwards 53'; Pollard 60'

Umpires:
Sebastian Duterme (BEL)
Haider Rasool (PAK)

17 July 2017
12:00

Australia	7–2	Japan
Knowles 1'; Whetton 5', 26'; Wotherspoon 28'; Zalewski 34'; Wickham 40'; Hayward 57'	Report	Yamada 42'; Zendana 51'

Umpires:
Gareth Greenfield (NZL)
Raghu Prasad (IND)

17 July 2017
14:00

Spain	4–3	New Zealand
Romeu 23'; González 35'; Iglesias 57'; Quemada 60'	Report	McAleese 43'; Woods 55'; Russell 55'

Umpires:
John Wright (RSA)
Grant Hundley (USA)

==== Pool B ====
Pos	Team	Pld	W	D	L	GF	GA	GD	Pts	Qualification
1	Germany	4	4	0	0	14	5	+9	12	Quarter-finals
2	Belgium	4	3	0	1	27	6	+21	9	Quarter-finals
3	Ireland	4	2	0	2	6	9	−3	6	Quarter-finals
4	Egypt	4	1	0	3	3	18	−15	3	Quarter-finals
5	South Africa (H)	4	0	0	4	5	17	−12	0	Ninth place game

Source: FIH
Rules for classification: 1) points; 2) goal difference; 3) goals scored; 4) head-to-head result.
(H) Hosts

9 July 2017
16:00

Belgium	10–0	Egypt
Briels 4', 60'; Boon 5', 57'; Stockbroekx 9'; Keusters 9'; De Kerpel 23'; Luypaert 30'; Charlier 40'; Dockier 46'	Report

Umpires:
Gareth Greenfield (NZL)
Gabriel Labate (ARG)

9 July 2017
18:00

South Africa	0–2	Ireland
	Report	Nelson 10'; O'Donoghue 42'

Umpires:
Roel van Eert (NED)
Dave Dowdall (ENG)

11 July 2017
12:00

Germany	5–0	Egypt
Miltkau 23'; T. Grambusch 27'; Linnekogel 37'; Gomoll 52'; Herzbruch 53'	Report

Umpires:
Roel van Eert (NED)
Sebastien Duterme (BEL)

11 July 2017
18:00

Belgium	6–2	Ireland
Gougnard 17'; Charlier 20'; Boon 28', 44', 48'; Luypaert 37'	Report	Cole 13'; Sothern 57'

Umpires:
Raghu Prasad (IND)
Grant Hundley (USA)

13 July 2017
12:00

Ireland	2–1	Egypt
Cargo 31'; O'Donoghue 59'	Report	El-Naggar 25'

Umpires:
Peter Wright (RSA)
Gabriel Labate (ARG)

13 July 2017
18:00

South Africa	3–4	Germany
Smith 37', 50'; Robinson 56'	Report	Trompertz 27'; Wellen 32'; M. Grambusch 34'; Herzbruch 38'

Umpires:
Haider Rasool (PAK)
Dave Dowdall (ENG)

15 July 2017
16:00

Egypt	2–1	South Africa
Ghobran 39', 41'	Report	Sibbald 30'

Umpires:
Roel van Eert (NED)
Gareth Greenfield (NZL)

15 July 2017
18:00

Belgium	2–3	Germany
Van Doren 32'; Gougnard 40'	Report	Miltkau 30'; Windfeder 43'; Linnekogel 54'

Umpires:
John Wright (RSA)
Raghu Prasad (IND)

17 July 2017
16:00

Germany	2–0	Ireland
T. Grambusch 12'; Zwicker 50'	Report

Umpires:
Peter Wright (RSA)
Sebastien Duterme (BEL)

17 July 2017
18:00

South Africa	1–9	Belgium
Guise-Brown 35'	Report	Hendrickx 3'; De Kerpel 7'; Briels 17', 25'; Dockier 27', 33'; Luypaert 29'; Charlier 29'; Boccard 59'

Umpires:
Haider Rasool (PAK)
Gabriel Labate (ARG)

=== Second round ===
Quarter-finals
19 July
Australia	4
Egypt	0
19 July
Belgium	2
New Zealand	0
19 July
Spain	2
Ireland	1
19 July
Germany	4
France	1

Semi-finals
21 July
Australia	1
Belgium	2
21 July
Spain	1 (3)
Germany (p.s.o.)	1 (4)

Final
23 July
Belgium	6
Germany	1
Third place
23 July
Australia	8
Spain	1

==== Quarter-finals ====
19 July 2017
11:15

Australia	4–0	Egypt
Hayward 10'; Whetton 13', 35'; Swann 20'	Report

Umpires:
Grant Hundley (USA)
Sebastien Duterme (BEL)

19 July 2017
13:30

Spain	2–1	Ireland
Sánchez 39'; Iglesias 45'	Report	Sothern 44'

Umpires:
Roel van Eert (NED)
Gareth Greenfield (NZL)

19 July 2017
15:45

Germany	4–1	France
T. Grambusch 15'; Herzbruch 26', 42'; Miltkau 52'	Report	Dumont 59'

Umpires:
John Wright (RSA)
Dave Dowdall (ENG)

19 July 2017
18:00

Belgium	2–0	New Zealand
Dockier 3'; Boon 5'	Report

Umpires:
Peter Wright (RSA)
Raghu Prasad (IND)

==== Ninth and tenth place ====
21 July 2017
10:00

Japan	2–4	South Africa
Yamasaki 15'; Mitani 49'	Report	Smith 13', 29'; Robinson 51'; Cassiem 56'

Umpires:
Grant Hundley (USA)
Gabriel Labate (ARG)

==== Fifth to eighth place classification ====
Crossover
21 July
Egypt	0
New Zealand	2
21 July
Ireland (p.s.o.)	1 (4)
France	1 (3)

Fifth place
22 July
New Zealand	0
Ireland	1
Seventh place
22 July
Egypt	0
France	3

===== Crossover =====
21 July 2017
12:15

Egypt	0–2	New Zealand
	Report	Haig 36'; Russell 50'

Umpires:
Haider Rasool (PAK)
Dave Dowdell (ENG)

21 July 2017
14:30

Ireland	1–1	France
O'Donoghue 42'	Report	Genestet 5'
Penalties
Harte (penalty shoot-out scored); Magee (penalty shoot-out scored); Jackson (penalty shoot-out scored); O'Donoghue (penalty shoot-out missed); Cargo (penalty shoot-out scored)	4–3	(penalty shoot-out scored) Lockwood; (penalty shoot-out scored) Kieffer; (penalty shoot-out scored) Van Straaten; (penalty shoot-out missed) Deront; (penalty shoot-out missed) Genestet

Umpires:
Peter Wright (RSA)
Raghu Prasad (IND)

===== Seventh and eighth place =====
22 July 2017
15:45

Egypt	0–3	France
	Report	Charlet 6'; Genestet 43'; Rogeau 48'

Umpires:
Roel van Eert (NED)
Gareth Greenfield (NZL)

===== Fifth and sixth place =====
22 July 2017
18:00

New Zealand	0–1	Ireland
	Report	Sothern 49'

Umpires:
Sebastien Duterme (BEL)
Gabriel Labate (ARG)

==== First to fourth place classification ====
===== Semi-finals =====
21 July 2017
15:45

Spain	1–1	Germany
Sánchez 15'	Report	Weinke 55'
Penalties
Serrahima (penalty shoot-out missed); Iglesias (penalty shoot-out scored); Salles (penalty shoot-out missed); González (penalty shoot-out missed); Enrique (penalty shoot-out scored); Enrique (penalty shoot-out scored); González (penalty shoot-out missed)	3–4	(penalty shoot-out missed) Rühr; (penalty shoot-out scored) Linnekogel; (penalty shoot-out missed) Miltkau; (penalty shoot-out scored) M. Grambusch; (penalty shoot-out missed) Trompertz; (penalty shoot-out scored) M. Grambusch; (penalty shoot-out scored) Rühr

Umpires:
Roel van Eert (NED)
Sebastien Duterme (BEL)

21 July 2017
18:00

Australia	1–2	Belgium
Hayward 45+'	Report	Charlier 22'; Keusters 36'

Umpires:
John Wright (RSA)
Gareth Greenfield (NZL)

===== Third and fourth place =====
23 July 2017
13:15

Australia	8–1	Spain
Whetton 7'; Hayward 10', 18'; Kleinschmidt 27', 34'; Craig 36'; Mitton 45'; Wickham 58'	Report	Quemada 59'

Umpires:
Raghu Prasad (IND)
Dave Dowdall (ENG)

===== Final =====
23 July 2017
18:00

Belgium	6–1	Germany
Van Doren 14'; Boon 20'; Keusters 22'; Charlier 27', 58'; Meurmans 59'	Report	T. Grambusch 16'

Umpires:
John Wright (RSA)
Peter Wright (RSA)

=== Awards ===
Top Goalscorer	Player of the Tournament	Goalkeeper of the Tournament	Young Player of the Tournament
(Belgium) Tom Boon	(Germany) Mats Grambusch	(Spain) Quico Cortés	(Belgium) Arthur Van Doren

== Final rankings ==
Qualification for 2018 Hockey World Cup

Rank	London	Johannesburg
1	Netherlands	Belgium
2	Argentina	Germany
3	England	Australia
4	Malaysia	Spain
5	Canada	Ireland
6	India	New Zealand
7	Pakistan	France
8	China	Egypt
9	South Korea	South Africa
10	Scotland	Japan

Host nation and continental champion
Continental champions
Qualified through FIH Hockey World League
