= 2017 Men's EuroHockey Championship squads =

This article lists the confirmed squads for the 2017 Men's EuroHockey Nations Championship tournament held in Amstelveen, Netherlands between 18 and 27 August 2020. The eight national teams were required to register a playing squad of eighteen players and two reserves.

== Pool A ==
=== Austria ===
The following was the Austria squad for the 2017 EuroHockey Championship.

Head coach: (India) Cedric D'Souza

3. Fabian Zeidler
5. Sebastian Eitenberger
6. Dominic Uher
7. Alexander Bele
8. Bernhard Schmidt
9. Michael Körper
10. Daniel Fröhlich
11. Patrick Schmidt
13. Benjamin Stanzl
14. Oliver Binder
15. Florian Steyrer
18. Michael Minar
19. Fabian Unterkircher
20. Patrick Stanzl
24. Leon Thörnblom
27. Xaver Husan (C)
30. Michael Mäntler (GK)
32. Mateusz Szymczyk (GK)

=== Belgium ===
The following was the Belgium squad for the 2017 EuroHockey Championship.

Head coach: (New Zealand) Shane McLeod

2. Loic Van Doren (GK)
4. Arthur Van Doren
8. Florent Van Aubel
9. Sébastien Dockier
10. Cédric Charlier
11. Amaury Keusters
12. Gauthier Boccard
14. Augustin Meurmans
15. Emmanuel Stockbroekx
16. Alexander Hendrickx
17. Thomas Briels (C)
19. Félix Denayer
21. Vincent Vanasch (GK)
22. Simon Gougnard
23. Arthur De Sloover
25. Loïck Luypaert
26. Victor Wegnez
27. Tom Boon

=== Netherlands ===
The following was the Netherlands squad for the 2017 EuroHockey Championship.

Head coach: (Argentina) Maximiliano Caldas

6. Jonas de Geus
7. Jorrit Croon
8. Billy Bakker
9. Seve van Ass (C)
10. Valentin Verga
11. Glenn Schuurman
12. Sander de Wijn
13. Sander Baart
14. Robbert Kemperman
16. Mirco Pruyser
18. Bjorn Kellerman
19. Bob de Voogd
22. Sam van der Ven (GK)
23. Joep de Mol
25. Thierry Brinkman
26. Pirmin Blaak (GK)
28. Floris Wortelboer
30. Mink van der Weerden

=== Spain ===
The following was the Spain squad for the 2017 EuroHockey Championship.

Head coach: (France) Fred Soyez

1. Francisco Cortés Juncosa (GK)
2. Joan Tarrés
3. Sergi Enrique (C)
4. Ricardo Sánchez
7. Pau Quemada
9. Álvaro Iglesias
12. Marc Garcia
14. Ricardo Santana
15. Diego Arana
17. Xavi Lleonart
18. Alejandro de Frutos
19. Marc Sallés
23. Josep Romeu
24. Marc Calzada (GK)
26. Marc Serrahima
28. Quique González
30. Marc Perellon
31. Ignasi Torras

== Pool B ==
=== England ===
The following was the England squad for the 2017 EuroHockey Championship.

Head coach: Bobby Crutchley

1. George Pinner (C, GK)
2. Harry Gibson (GK)
4. Ollie Willars
5. David Ames
6. Henry Weir
9. Harry Martin
11. Ian Sloan (C)
12. Michael Hoare
13. Sam Ward
14. Mark Gleghorne
15. Phil Roper (C)
16. Adam Dixon
17. Barry Middleton
18. Brendan Creed
19. David Goodfield
22. David Condon
25. Chris Griffiths
27. Liam Sanford

=== Germany ===
The following was the Germany squad for the 2017 EuroHockey Championship.

Head coach: Stefan Kermas

1. Mark Appel (GK)
2. Mathias Müller
3. Mats Grambusch
4. Lukas Windfeder
5. Max Kapaun
6. Martin Häner (C)
8. Julius Meyer
9. Niklas Wellen
10. Moritz Trompertz
11. Constantin Staib
13. Tobias Hauke
16. Dieter Linnekogel
17. Christopher Rühr
20. Martin Zwicker
21. Tobias Walter (GK)
22. Marco Miltkau
23. Anton Boeckel
24. Benedikt Fürk

=== Ireland ===
The following was the Ireland squad for the 2017 EuroHockey Championship.

Head coach: (South Africa) Craig Fulton

1. David Harte (C, GK)
3. John Jackson
4. Jonathan Bell
5. Matthew Bell
9. Matthew Nelson
10. Alan Sothern
14. Neal Glassey
15. Kirk Shimmins
16. Shane O'Donoghue
17. Sean Murray
22. Michael Robson
24. Ben Walker
25. Daragh Walsh
26. Paul Gleghorne
27. Conor Harte
29. Lee Cole
30. Stuart Loughrey
31. Mark Ingram (GK)

=== Poland ===
The following was the Poland squad for the 2017 EuroHockey Championship.

Head coach: Karol Sniezek

1. Mateusz Popiolkowski (GK)
4. Michal Raciniewski
5. Mikolaj Gumny
6. Dominik Kotulski
9. Mateusz Poltaszewski
10. Maciej Janiszewski
11. Mateusz Hulboj
12. Maciej Pacanowski (GK)
13. Tomasz Wachowiak
14. Jacek Kurowski
15. Robert Gruszczynski
16. Jakub Janicki
18. Patryk Pawlak
22. Sebastian Sellner
23. Michal Kasprzyk
25. Adrian Krokosz (C)
27. Pawel Bratkowski
28. Michal Poltaszewski
