= 2020–21 Men's FIH Pro League =

Men's field hockey competition

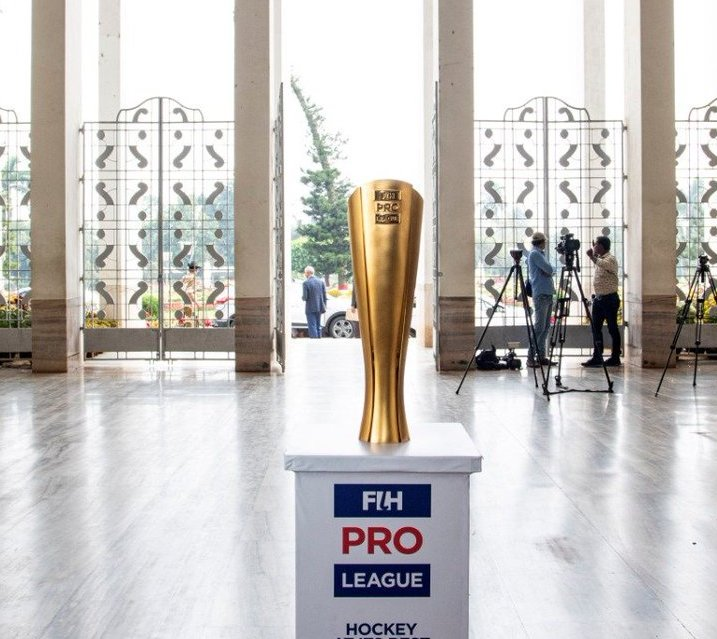
- Dates: 18 January 2020 – 27 June 2021
- Teams: 9 (from 4 confederations)

Final positions
- Champions: Belgium (1st title)
- Runner-up: Australia
- Third place: Germany

Tournament statistics
- Matches played: 50
- Goals scored: 248 (4.96 per match)
- Top scorer: (Belgium) Alexander Hendrickx (11 goals)

The 2020–21 Men's FIH Pro League was the second season of the Pro League, the premier men's field hockey national team league series. The tournament started in January 2020 and finished in June 2021.

== Format changes ==
The home and away principle was kept but this principle was split over two consecutive seasons from this season onwards and worked according to the following example:

- in season 2020-21, Team A hosted Team B twice within a couple of days
- in season 2021-22:, Team B will host Team A twice within a couple of days

== COVID-19 pandemic interruption ==
Due to the outbreak of COVID-19, Hockey Australia decided to suspend all international travels for its national teams until further notice in early March. Later Hockey New Zealand took the same decision.

Once declared as a pandemic on 11 March, the FIH and all participating National Associations involved in the competition decided to put all the matches scheduled until 15 April on hold. Furthermore, it was agreed that the current edition is maintained, no matches will be played after the Olympic Games and depending on the evolution of the situation and the decisions of the public authorities, every match which can be organized between late April and before the Olympics, shall be played. On 19 March, it was announced by the FIH that all the matches scheduled to play until 17 May were put on hold. On 24 April, the league was extended until June 2021. The restart for September 2020, was announced on 9 July. Because not all matches are due to be played before the end of the season, the final ranking will be determined by points percentage instead of total points.

On 28 May, it was announced that despite the efforts of the involved federations, the matches set to play before the announcing date were going to be the last of the edition.

== Teams ==
Nine teams competed in a round-robin tournament, being played from January to June.

- Argentina (4)
- Australia (1)
- Belgium (2)
- Germany (6)
- Great Britain (7)
- India (5)
- Netherlands (3)
- New Zealand (9)
- Spain (8)

== Results ==
=== Standings ===
Pos	Team	Pld	W	SOW	SOL	L	GF	GA	GD	PCT
1st place, gold medalist(s)	Belgium (C)	14	9	2	1	2	40	26	+14	.762
2nd place, silver medalist(s)	Australia	10	5	1	3	1	36	23	+13	.667
3rd place, bronze medalist(s)	Germany	10	5	2	0	3	26	23	+3	.633
4	India	8	3	3	0	2	22	17	+5	.625
5	Netherlands	12	5	2	2	3	32	29	+3	.583
6	Great Britain	12	4	0	3	5	25	25	0	.417
7	Argentina	12	2	1	3	6	26	35	−9	.306
8	New Zealand	10	2	1	0	7	18	34	−16	.267
9	Spain	12	2	1	1	8	23	36	−13	.250

Source: FIH
Rules for classification: 1) points; 2) matches won; 3) goal difference; 4) goals for; 5) head-to-head result; 6) field goals scored.
(C) Champion

All times are local.

=== Fixtures ===
18 January 2020
19:00

India	5–2	Netherlands
Gurjant 1'; Rupinder 12', 46'; Mandeep 34'; Lalit 36'	Report	Janssen 14'; Hertzberger 28'

Kalinga Stadium, Bhubaneswar
Umpires:
Gareth Greenfield (NZL)
Rawi Anbananthan (MAS)

19 January 2020
17:00

India	3–3	Netherlands
Lalit 25'; Mandeep 51'; Rupinder 55'	Report	Van der Weerden 23'; Hertzberger 26'; Kellerman 27'
Penalties
Harmanpreet (penalty shoot-out missed); Vivek (penalty shoot-out scored); Rupinder (penalty shoot-out missed); Gurjant (penalty shoot-out scored); Akashdeep (penalty shoot-out scored)	3–1	(penalty shoot-out missed) Hertzberger; (penalty shoot-out missed) Schuurman; (penalty shoot-out missed) Brinkman; (penalty shoot-out scored) Pruyser

Kalinga Stadium, Bhubaneswar
Umpires:
Rawi Anbananthan (MAS)
Sean Rapaport (RSA)

24 January 2020
11:00

Spain	2–2	Germany
Alegre 11'; Quemada 38'	Report	Rühr 3', 57'
Penalties
Iglesias (penalty shoot-out missed); Oliva (penalty shoot-out scored); Lleonart (penalty shoot-out scored); Alegre (penalty shoot-out scored); Romeu (penalty shoot-out missed)	3–4	(penalty shoot-out scored) Rühr; (penalty shoot-out scored) Hauke; (penalty shoot-out scored) Wellen; (penalty shoot-out scored) Fuchs

Estadio Betero, Valencia
Umpires:
Coen van Bunge (NED)
Jonas van 't Hek (NED)

25 January 2020
13:00

Spain	1–5	Germany
Miralles 45'	Report	Rühr 13'; Oruz 32'; Miltkau 56'; Windfeder 59'; Staib 60'

Estadio Betero, Valencia
Umpires:
Jonas van 't Hek (NED)
Bruce Bale (ENG)

25 January 2020
18:30

Australia	2–2	Belgium
Hayward 49'; Craig 51'	Report	Briels 18'; Denayer 59'
Penalties
Brand (penalty shoot-out missed); Ogilvie (penalty shoot-out scored); Craig (penalty shoot-out missed); Swann (penalty shoot-out scored)	2–4	(penalty shoot-out scored) Van Aubel; (penalty shoot-out missed) De Sloover; (penalty shoot-out scored) Gougnard; (penalty shoot-out scored) Wegnez; (penalty shoot-out scored) A. Van Doren

Sydney Olympic Park Hockey Centre, Sydney
Umpires:
Raghu Prasad (IND)
Simon Taylor (NZL)

26 January 2020
17:30

Australia	2–4	Belgium
Sharp 42'; Hayward 60'	Report	Hendrickx 13', 25'; Plennevaux 56'; E. Stockbroekx 58'

Sydney Olympic Park Hockey Centre, Sydney
Umpires:
Raghu Prasad (IND)
Simon Taylor (NZL)

31 January 2020
11:00

Spain	3–4	Netherlands
Romeu 5', 37', 58'	Report	Janssen 2', 48', 50'; De Geus 15'

Estadio Betero, Valencia
Umpires:
Christian Blasch (GER)
Sean Rapaport (RSA)

1 February 2020
13:00

Spain	2–4	Netherlands
Miralles 44'; Sánchez 59'	Report	Janssen 27'; Brinkman 36'; Van der Weerden 45'; Kellerman 50'

Estadio Betero, Valencia
Umpires:
Ben Göntgen (GER)
Christian Blasch (GER)

1 February 2020
16:00

Australia	4–4	Great Britain
Ockenden 19'; Wickham 29'; Zalewski 56'; Mitton 59'	Report	Jackson 20'; Wallace 31'; Shipperley 44'; Ansell 45'
Penalties
Swann (penalty shoot-out missed); Whetton (penalty shoot-out scored); Harvie (penalty shoot-out scored); Ogilvie (penalty shoot-out scored)	3–1	(penalty shoot-out scored) Forsyth; (penalty shoot-out missed) Sorsby; (penalty shoot-out missed) Roper; (penalty shoot-out missed) Wallace

Sydney Olympic Park Hockey Centre, Sydney
Umpires:
David Tomlinson (NZL)
Javed Shaikh (IND)

1 February 2020
19:30

New Zealand	2–6	Belgium
Muir 17', 41'	Report	Denayer 3', 5'; Boon 7', 52'; Dockier 19'; De Kerpel 41'

North Harbour Hockey Stadium, Auckland
Umpires:
Adam Kearns (AUS)
Aleisha Neumann (AUS)

2 February 2020
15:00

Australia	5–1	Great Britain
Wotherspoon 14'; Sharp 19'; Craig 29'; Brand 45'; Mitton 55'	Report	Taylor 18'

Sydney Olympic Park Hockey Centre, Sydney
Umpires:
Javed Shaikh (IND)
David Tomlinson (NZL)

2 February 2020
17:30

New Zealand	1–3	Belgium
Tarrant 34'	Report	Hendrickx 19'; Dockier 24'; Cosyns 53'

North Harbour Hockey Stadium, Auckland
Umpires:
Steve Rogers (AUS)
Adam Kearns (AUS)

7 February 2020
20:30

Argentina	3–4	Spain
Casella 5', 26'; Tolini 41'	Report	Iglesias 13'; Quemada 29', 59'; Ruiz 55'

CeNARD, Buenos Aires
Umpires:
Bruce Bale (ENG)
Federico García (URU)

8 February 2020
17:00

New Zealand	1–1	Great Britain
Jenness 43'	Report	Griffiths 56'
Penalties
Jenness (penalty shoot-out scored); S. Child (penalty shoot-out missed); Thomas (penalty shoot-out scored); Edwards (penalty shoot-out scored)	3–1	(penalty shoot-out scored) Calnan; (penalty shoot-out missed) Ansell; (penalty shoot-out missed) Griffiths; (penalty shoot-out missed) Ames

North Harbour Hockey Stadium, Auckland
Umpires:
Lim Hong-Zhen (SGP)
Steve Rogers (AUS)

8 February 2020
17:00

India	2–1	Belgium
Mandeep 2'; Ramandeep 46'	Report	Boccard 33'

Kalinga Stadium, Bhubaneswar
Umpires:
David Tomlinson (NZL)
Coen van Bunge (NED)

8 February 2020
20:30

Argentina	5–1	Spain
Ferreiro 9'; Vila 32'; Tolini 38'; Martínez 42', 46'	Report	Quemada 22'

CeNARD, Buenos Aires
Umpires:
Federico García (URU)
Bruce Bale (ENG)

9 February 2020
15:00

New Zealand	0–3	Great Britain
	Report	Dixon 14', 55'; Ansell 50'

North Harbour Hockey Stadium, Auckland
Umpires:
Steve Rogers (AUS)
Lim Hong-Zhen (SGP)

9 February 2020
17:00

India	2–3	Belgium
Vivek 15'; Amit 17'	Report	Hendrickx 3'; De Kerpel 17'; Plennevaux 26'

Kalinga Stadium, Bhubaneswar
Umpires:
Coen van Bunge (NED)
Gareth Greenfield (NZL)

15 February 2020
18:00

Argentina	2–2	Netherlands
Martínez 12'; Tolini 51'	Report	Pruyser 5'; Bakker 12'
Penalties
Keenan (penalty shoot-out missed); Domene (penalty shoot-out scored); Ferreiro (penalty shoot-out missed); Mazzilli (penalty shoot-out missed)	1–3	(penalty shoot-out scored) Hertzberger; (penalty shoot-out scored) Schuurman; (penalty shoot-out scored) De Geus

CeNARD, Buenos Aires
Umpires:
Steve Rogers (AUS)
Jakub Mejzlík (CZE)

15 February 2020
19:30

New Zealand	1–4	Spain
Russell 42'	Report	Oliva 12'; Beltrán 23', 42'; Quemada 51'

Ngā Puna Wai Sports Hub, Christchurch
Umpires:
Adam Kearns (AUS)
Javed Shaikh (IND)

16 February 2020
17:30

New Zealand	3–2	Spain
Russell 16', 56'; Edwards 38'	Report	Iglesias 44'; Quemada 60'

Ngā Puna Wai Sports Hub, Christchurch
Umpires:
Javed Shaikh (IND)
Adam Kearns (AUS)

16 February 2020
18:00

Argentina	2–2	Netherlands
Vila 3'; Mazzilli 21'	Report	Pruyser 30'; Kemperman 56'
Penalties
Ortiz (penalty shoot-out scored); Vila (penalty shoot-out scored); Rey (penalty shoot-out scored); Martínez (penalty shoot-out missed); Mazzilli (penalty shoot-out missed)	3–4	(penalty shoot-out scored) Hertzberger; (penalty shoot-out scored) Van Ass; (penalty shoot-out missed) De Geus; (penalty shoot-out scored) Van Dam; (penalty shoot-out scored) Pruyser

CeNARD, Buenos Aires
Umpires:
Jakub Mejzlík (CZE)
Steve Rogers (AUS)

21 February 2020
19:00

India	3–4	Australia
Raj 36', 47'; Rupinder 52'	Report	Wotherspoon 6'; Wickham 18'; Sharp 41'; Anderson 42'

Kalinga Stadium, Bhubaneswar
Umpires:
Simon Taylor (NZL)
Coen van Bunge (NED)

22 February 2020
19:00

India	2–2	Australia
Rupinder 25'; Harmanpreet 27'	Report	Mitton 23'; Zalewski 46'
Penalties
Harmanpreet (penalty shoot-out scored); Vivek (penalty shoot-out scored); Lalit (penalty shoot-out scored)	3–1	(penalty shoot-out scored) Beale; (penalty shoot-out missed) Brand; (penalty shoot-out missed) Ephraums; (penalty shoot-out missed) Harvie

Kalinga Stadium, Bhubaneswar
Umpires:
Rawi Anbananthan (MAS)
Coen van Bunge (NED)

28 February 2020
17:30

New Zealand	5–3	Argentina
Lane 5'; Thomas 32'; J. Panchia 48'; Bennett 51'; Newman 55'	Report	Casella 9'; Tolini 33', 49'

Ngā Puna Wai Sports Hub, Christchurch
Umpires:
Peter Wright (RSA)
Steve Rogers (AUS)

1 March 2020
15:00

New Zealand	2–3	Argentina
Lane 20', 49'	Report	Tolini 5'; Ortiz 37'; Casella 44'

Ngā Puna Wai Sports Hub, Christchurch
Umpires:
Peter Wright (RSA)
Steve Rogers (AUS)

6 March 2020
20:30

Australia	3–3	Argentina
Hayward 4'; Wickham 8'; Welch 52'	Report	Ferreiro 11'; Tolini 20'; Martínez 39'
Penalties
Ogilvie (penalty shoot-out scored); Wickham (penalty shoot-out missed); Simmonds (penalty shoot-out missed); Swann (penalty shoot-out missed)	1–3	(penalty shoot-out scored) Ibarra; (penalty shoot-out scored) Vila; (penalty shoot-out scored) Ortiz

Perth Hockey Stadium, Perth
Umpires:
Gareth Greenfield (NZL)
Peter Wright (RSA)

7 March 2020
18:30

Australia	5–1	Argentina
Simmonds 10'; Govers 24', 30'; Wickham 44'; Mitton 49'	Report	Tolini 57'

Perth Hockey Stadium, Perth
Umpires:
Gareth Greenfield (NZL)
Peter Wright (RSA)

22 September 2020
18:00

Germany	1–6	Belgium
Windfeder 44'	Report	Boccard 26'; Hendrickx 33', 60'; Ghislain 34'; De Kerpel 36'; Kina 57'

Düsseldorfer HC, Düsseldorf
Umpires:
Martin Madden (SCO)
Marcin Grochal (POL)

23 September 2020
18:00

Germany	1–1	Belgium
Fuchs 24'	Report	Luypaert 49'
Penalties
Rühr (penalty shoot-out scored); Hauke (penalty shoot-out missed); Grambusch (penalty shoot-out missed); Große (penalty shoot-out missed)	1–0	(penalty shoot-out missed) Wegnez; (penalty shoot-out missed) Denayer; (penalty shoot-out missed) Cosyns; (penalty shoot-out missed) A. Van Doren; (penalty shoot-out missed) De Sloover

Düsseldorfer HC, Düsseldorf
Umpires:
Marcin Grochal (POL)
Martin Madden (SCO)

27 October 2020
19:00

Netherlands	1–0	Great Britain
Wortelboer 30'	Report

Wagener Stadium, Amstelveen
Umpires:
Laurine Delforge (BEL)
Coen van Bunge (NED)

29 October 2020
19:00

Netherlands	3–1	Great Britain
Van der Weerden 9'; Hertzberger 47', 48'	Report	Roper 30'

Wagener Stadium, Amstelveen
Umpires:
Laurine Delforge (BEL)
Jonas van 't Hek (NED)

31 October 2020
16:30

Belgium	3–2	Great Britain
Hendrickx 27'; Boon 33'; Dohmen 59'	Report	Roper 30'; Waller 42'

Royal Uccle Sport, Brussels
Umpires:
Laurine Delforge (BEL)
Coen van Bunge (NED)

1 November 2020
16:30

Belgium	2–1	Great Britain
Dohmen 18'; Hendrickx 30'	Report	Condon 10'

Royal Uccle Sport, Brussels
Umpires:
Laurine Delforge (BEL)
Jonas van 't Hek (NED)

4 November 2020
18:00

Belgium	4–4	Netherlands
Hendrickx 8', 51'; Plennevaux 36'; Van Aubel 50'	Report	Hertzberger 8'; Brinkman 13'; Janssen 37'; Bakker 52'
Penalties
Gougnard (penalty shoot-out scored); Van Aubel (penalty shoot-out scored); Cosyns (penalty shoot-out scored)	3–1	(penalty shoot-out scored) Croon; (penalty shoot-out missed) Pruyser; (penalty shoot-out missed) Hertzberger; (penalty shoot-out missed) Van Ass

Royal Uccle Sport, Brussels
Umpires:
Coen van Bunge (NED)
Laurine Delforge (BEL)

5 February 2021
11:00

Spain	2–3	Belgium
Alegre 15'; Lleonart 44'	Report	Dockier 8', 51'; Briels 14'

Estadio Betero, Valencia
Umpires:
Francisco Vázquez (ESP)
Jakub Mejzlík (CZE)

6 February 2021
13:00

Spain	0–2	Belgium
	Report	Gougnard 10'; Hendrickx 18'

Estadio Betero, Valencia
Umpires:
Francisco Vázquez (ESP)
Jakub Mejzlík (CZE)

6 March 2021
16:30

Netherlands	2–4	Germany
Janssen 7'; Hertzberger 58'	Report	Staib 18', 53'; Kaufmann 25'; Miltkau 39'

Wagener Stadium, Amstelveen
Umpires:
Laurine Delforge (BEL)
Coen van Bunge (NED)

7 March 2021
16:30

Netherlands	1–3	Germany
Van Ass 38'	Report	Weigand 11', 51'; Grambusch 59'

Wagener Stadium, Amstelveen
Umpires:
Laurine Delforge (BEL)
Jonas van 't Hek (NED)

3 April 2021
14:30

Argentina	2–3	Germany
Tolini 12', 32'	Report	Rühr 8'; Gill 29'; Staib 56'

CeNARD, Buenos Aires
Umpires:
Diego Barbas (ARG)
Germán Montes de Oca (ARG)

4 April 2021
14:30

Argentina	0–3	Germany
	Report	Rühr 25'; Zwicker 38'; Staib 46'

CeNARD, Buenos Aires
Umpires:
Germán Montes de Oca (ARG)
Diego Barbas (ARG)

10 April 2021
17:00

Argentina	2–2	India
Ferreiro 28', 30'	Report	Harmanpreet 21', 60'
Penalties
Keenan (penalty shoot-out scored); Martínez (penalty shoot-out scored); Vila (penalty shoot-out missed); Ferreiro (penalty shoot-out missed); Ortiz (penalty shoot-out missed)	2–3	(penalty shoot-out missed) Harmanpreet; (penalty shoot-out scored) Lalit; (penalty shoot-out scored) Rupinder; (penalty shoot-out missed) Shamsher; (penalty shoot-out scored) Dilpreet

CeNARD, Buenos Aires
Umpires:
Germán Montes de Oca (ARG)
Carolina de la Fuente (ARG)

11 April 2021
17:00

Argentina	0–3	India
	Report	Harmanpreet 11'; Lalit 25'; Mandeep 58'

CeNARD, Buenos Aires
Umpires:
Germán Montes de Oca (ARG)
Irene Presenqui (ARG)

12 May 2021 (Note: The matches, originally scheduled for 14 and 15 November 2020, were postponed by the request of the German team.)
17:30

Great Britain	5–3	Germany
Ansell 9'; Creed 13'; Roper 20'; Griffiths 24'; Martin 32'	Report	Röthlander 1'; Prinz 20'; Dösch 28'

Lee Valley Hockey and Tennis Centre, London
Umpires:
Martin Madden (SCO)
Paul Walker (ENG)

13 May 2021
17:30

Great Britain	3–1	Germany
Griffiths 24'; Forsyth 29'; Shipperley 54'	Report	Wellen 58'

Lee Valley Hockey and Tennis Centre, London
Umpires:
Paul Walker (ENG)
Martin Madden (SCO)

22 May 2021
13:00

Great Britain	2–2	Spain
Ansell 24'; Shipperley 60'	Report	Iglesias 6'; Basterra 9'
Penalties
Ansell (penalty shoot-out scored); Dixon (penalty shoot-out missed); Forsyth (penalty shoot-out missed); Wallace (penalty shoot-out missed)	1–3	(penalty shoot-out scored) Miralles; (penalty shoot-out scored) Alegre; (penalty shoot-out scored) Lleonart

Lee Valley Hockey and Tennis Centre, London
Umpires:
Hannah Harrison (ENG)
Dan Barstow (ENG)

23 May 2021
12:00

Great Britain	2–0	Spain
Shipperley 28', 41'	Report

Lee Valley Hockey and Tennis Centre, London
Umpires:
Dan Barstow (ENG)
Hannah Harrison (ENG)

30 May 2021
16:30

Belgium	0–4	Netherlands
	Report	Bovendeert 18'; Pruyser 29'; Van Ass 35'; Brinkman 38'

Wilrijkse Plein, Antwerp
Umpires:
Coen van Bunge (NED)
Jonas van 't Hek (NED)

26 June 2021 (Note: The matches, originally scheduled for 24 and 25 April 2021, were postponed.)
12:30

Australia	7–3	New Zealand
Ogilvie 11'; Mitton 17'; Hayward 20', 40'; Govers 38'; Whetton 52'; Brand 56'	Report	Lane 21'; Jenness 34'; Wilson 41'

Perth Hockey Stadium, Perth
Umpires:
Adam Kearns (AUS)
Peter Wright (RSA)

27 June 2021
12:30

Australia	2–0	New Zealand
Ephraums 11'; Govers 40'	Report

Perth Hockey Stadium, Perth
Umpires:
Peter Wright (RSA)
Adam Kearns (AUS)

Great Britain	Cancelled (Note: The matches could not be rescheduled and were cancelled.)	India
	Report

Great Britain	Cancelled	India
	Report

Great Britain	Cancelled	Argentina
	Report

Spain	Cancelled	Australia
	Report

Great Britain	Cancelled	Argentina
	Report

Spain	Cancelled	Australia
	Report

Spain	Cancelled	India
	Report

Spain	Cancelled	India
	Report

Netherlands	Cancelled	New Zealand
	Report

Netherlands	Cancelled	New Zealand
	Report

Germany	Cancelled	New Zealand
	Report

Germany	Cancelled	New Zealand
	Report

Germany	Cancelled	India
	Report

Belgium	Cancelled	Argentina
	Report

Germany	Cancelled	India
	Report

Belgium	Cancelled	Argentina
	Report

Netherlands	Cancelled	Australia
	Report

Netherlands	Cancelled	Australia
	Report

Germany	Cancelled	Australia
	Report

India	Cancelled	New Zealand
	Report

Germany	Cancelled	Australia
	Report

India	Cancelled	New Zealand
	Report

== Goalscorers ==
There were 248 goals scored in 50 matches, for an average of 4.96 goals per match.

11 goals

- (Belgium) Alexander Hendrickx

10 goals

- (Argentina) Leandro Tolini

7 goals

- (Netherlands) Jip Janssen

6 goals

- (Netherlands) Jeroen Hertzberger
- (Spain) Pau Quemada

5 goals

- (Australia) Jeremy Hayward
- (Australia) Trent Mitton
- (Germany) Christopher Rühr
- (Germany) Constantin Staib
- (United Kingdom) Rupert Shipperley
- (India) Rupinder Pal Singh

4 goals

- (Argentina) Maico Casella
- (Argentina) Martín Ferreiro
- (Argentina) Lucas Martínez
- (Australia) Blake Govers
- (Australia) Tom Wickham
- (Belgium) Sébastien Dockier
- (United Kingdom) Liam Ansell
- (India) Harmanpreet Singh
- (India) Mandeep Singh
- (New Zealand) Sam Lane

3 goals

- (Australia) Lachlan Sharp
- (Belgium) Tom Boon
- (Belgium) Félix Denayer
- (Belgium) Nicolas De Kerpel
- (Belgium) Maxime Plennevaux
- (United Kingdom) Chris Griffiths
- (United Kingdom) Phil Roper
- (India) Lalit Upadhyay
- (Netherlands) Thierry Brinkman
- (Netherlands) Mirco Pruyser
- (Netherlands) Mink van der Weerden
- (New Zealand) Kane Russell
- (Spain) Álvaro Iglesias
- (Spain) Josep Romeu

2 goals

- (Argentina) Lucas Vila
- (Australia) Tim Brand
- (Australia) Tom Craig
- (Australia) Dylan Wotherspoon
- (Australia) Aran Zalewski
- (Belgium) Gauthier Boccard
- (Belgium) Thomas Briels
- (Belgium) John-John Dohmen
- (Germany) Marco Miltkau
- (Germany) Justus Weigand
- (Germany) Lukas Windfeder
- (United Kingdom) Adam Dixon
- (India) Raj Kumar Pal
- (Netherlands) Seve van Ass
- (Netherlands) Billy Bakker
- (Netherlands) Bjorn Kellerman
- (New Zealand) Stephen Jenness
- (New Zealand) George Muir
- (Spain) David Alegre
- (Spain) Albert Beltrán
- (Spain) Marc Miralles

1 goal

- (Argentina) Agustín Mazzilli
- (Argentina) Ignacio Ortiz
- (Australia) Nathan Ephraums
- (Australia) Jacob Anderson
- (Australia) Eddie Ockenden
- (Australia) Flynn Ogilvie
- (Australia) Joshua Simmonds
- (Australia) Jack Welch
- (Australia) Jake Whetton
- (Belgium) Florent Van Aubel
- (Belgium) Tanguy Cosyns
- (Belgium) William Ghislain
- (Belgium) Simon Gougnard
- (Belgium) Antoine Kina
- (Belgium) Loïck Luypaert
- (Belgium) Emmanuel Stockbroekx
- (Germany) Paul Dösch
- (Germany) Florian Fuchs
- (Germany) Luis Gill
- (Germany) Mats Grambusch
- (Germany) Paul-Philipp Kaufmann
- (Germany) Timur Oruz
- (Germany) Thies Prinz
- (Germany) Moritz Röthlander
- (Germany) Niklas Wellen
- (Germany) Martin Zwicker
- (United Kingdom) David Condon
- (United Kingdom) Brendan Creed
- (United Kingdom) Alan Forsyth
- (United Kingdom) Ashley Jackson
- (United Kingdom) Harry Martin
- (United Kingdom) Luke Taylor
- (United Kingdom) Zach Wallace
- (United Kingdom) Jack Waller
- (India) Vivek Prasad
- (India) Amit Rohidas
- (India) Gurjant Singh
- (India) Ramandeep Singh
- (Netherlands) Roel Bovendeert
- (Netherlands) Jonas de Geus
- (Netherlands) Robbert Kemperman
- (Netherlands) Floris Wortelboer
- (New Zealand) Cory Bennett
- (New Zealand) Steve Edwards
- (New Zealand) Dominic Newman
- (New Zealand) Jared Panchia
- (New Zealand) Blair Tarrant
- (New Zealand) Dylan Thomas
- (New Zealand) Nick Wilson
- (Spain) José Basterra
- (Spain) Xavi Lleonart
- (Spain) Roc Oliva
- (Spain) Viçens Ruiz
- (Spain) Ricardo Sánchez

Source: FIH

== See also ==
- 2020–21 Women's FIH Pro League
