= Luke Taylor =

Luke Taylor may refer to:

- Luke Taylor (field hockey)
- Luke Taylor (politician)
