= Kais al Saadi =

German field hockey coach (born 1976)

Personal information
- Nationality: German
- Born: 6 November 1976 (age 48); Hamburg

Sport
- Country: Germany
- Team: Germany (coach)

Kais al Saadi (born 6 November 1976) is a German field hockey coach of the German national team.

He managed the German team at the 2020 Summer Olympics. After the Olympics his contract was not extended.
