= Amaury Keusters =

Belgian field hockey player

Personal information
- Born: 1 October 1990 (age 35)

Sport
- Sport: Field hockey
- Position: Forward
- Club: Royal Herakles
National team
Years	Team	Caps	Goals
2012–2018	Belgium	100	(23)
Medal record
Men's field hockey
Representing Belgium
European Championships
Silver medal – second place	2017 Amstelveen

Amaury Keusters (born 1 October 1990) is a Belgian field hockey player who plays as a forward for Royal Herakles.

He was part of the Belgian selection that placed for the final at the 2017 European Championship in Amstelveen. After having played 100 matches for the national team since 2012, he announced his retirement from the national team in February 2019.
