= Augustin Meurmans =

Belgian field hockey player

Personal information
- Full name: Augustin Jean Meurmans
- Born: 29 May 1997 (age 29) Ottignies, Belgium

Sport
- Sport: Field hockey
- Position: Midfielder
- Club: Racing
Youth career
- Years: Team
- 2007–2015: LARA Wavre HC
Senior career
Years	Team	Caps	Goals
2015–present	Racing	-	-
National team
Years	Team	Caps	Goals
2016	Belgium U21	14	(1)
2017–present	Belgium	74	(1)
Medal record
Men's field hockey
Representing Belgium
Olympic Games
Gold medal – first place	2020 Tokyo	Team
World Cup
Gold medal – first place	2018 Bhubaneswar
EuroHockey Championship
Silver medal – second place	2017 Amstelveen
Junior World Cup
Silver medal – second place	2016 Lucknow
- Updated on 3 October 2024

Augustin Jean Meurmans (born 29 May 1997) is a Belgian field hockey player who plays as a midfielder for Racing Club de Bruxelles and the Belgium national team.

== International career ==
He was part of the Belgian selection that placed for the final at the 2017 European Championship in Amstelveen. Initially, he was not selected for the 2018 World Cup but he replaced John-John Dohmen later in the tournament who had to withdraw injured. He played in Belgium's last four matches of the tournament, which they eventually won by defeating the Netherlands in the final. In November 2021 he announced he would take a break from the national team to focus on his studies. After the 2024 Summer Olympics he returned in the national team training group.

== Honours ==
Racing

- Belgian Hockey League: 2021–22

Belgium

- Olympic gold medal: 2020
- World Cup: 2018
- FIH Pro League: 2020–21
