= Albert Béltran =

Spanish field hockey player (born 1993)

Personal information
- Full name: Albert Béltran Mir
- Born: 23 October 1993 (age 32)
- Height: 1.79 m (5 ft 10 in)

Sport
- Sport: Field hockey
- Position: Forward
- Club: Klein Zwitserland
Senior career
Years	Team	Caps	Goals
–	Atlètic Terrassa	-	-
2017–2019	Rotterdam	-	-
2019–2021	Atlètic Terrassa	-	-
2021–present	Klein Zwitserland	-	-
National team
Years	Team	Caps	Goals
2014–present	Spain	97	(27)

Albert Béltran Mir is a Spanish field hockey player who plays as a forward for Dutch Hoofdklasse club Klein Zwitserland and the Spanish national team.

He competed in the 2020 Summer Olympics.

== Club career ==
Béltran played for Atlètic Terrassa until 2017 when he signed for Rotterdam in the Dutch Hoofdklasse. He played there for two season when he returned to Atlètic Terrassa. After the 2020 Summer Olympics he returned to the Netherlands and signed for Klein Zwitserland.
