= Sergi Enrique =

Spanish field hockey player (born 1987)

Personal information
- Full name: Sergi Enrique Montserrat
- Born: 22 September 1987 (age 38) Matadepera, Spain

Sport
- Sport: Field hockey
- Position: Defender
- Club: Atlètic Terrassa
Senior career
Years	Team	Caps	Goals
–2013	Atlètic Terrassa	-	-
2013–2017	Daring	-	-
2017–2019	Junior	-	-
2019–	Atlètic Terrassa	-	-
National team
Years	Team	Caps	Goals
2004–	Spain	306	-
Medal record
Olympic Games
Silver medal – second place	2008 Beijing	Team
World Cup
Bronze medal – third place	2006 Mönchengladbach
Champions Trophy
Gold medal – first place	2004 Lahore
Silver medal – second place	2011 Auckland
European Championship
Silver medal – second place	2007 Manchester
Silver medal – second place	2019 Antwerp
- Updated on 26 August 2019

Sergi Enrique Montserrat (born 22 September 1987) is a Spanish field hockey player who plays as a defender for Atlètic Terrassa and the Spain national team.

== Club career ==
Enrique has played for Atletic Terrassa and Junior in Spain and Royal Daring in Belgium. He returned to Atlètic Terrassa for the 2019–20 season.

== International career ==
He played internationally with the Spain national team that won the silver medal at the 2008 Summer Olympics in Beijing, PR China. During the 2019 EuroHockey Championship, where they won the silver medal, he became Spain's most capped player of all time with 305 appearances for the national team.
