= Ignacio Ortiz (field hockey) =

Argentine field hockey player

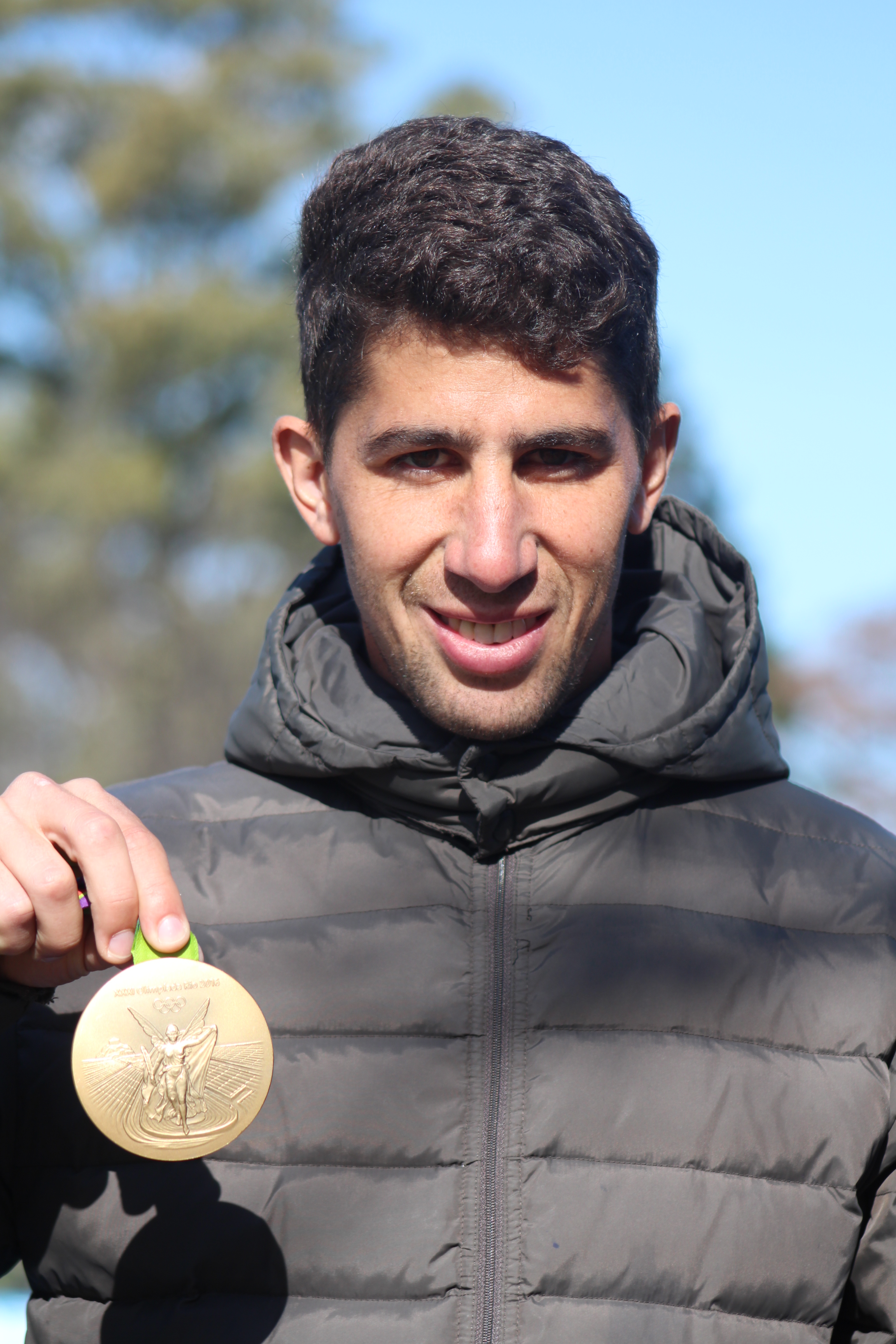
- Ignacio Ortiz in 2016

Personal information
- Full name: Ignacio Horacio Ortiz
- Born: 26 June 1987 (age 39) Buenos Aires, Argentina
- Height: 1.80 m (5 ft 11 in)
- Weight: 76 kg (168 lb)

Sport
- Sport: Field hockey
- Position: Midfielder
- Club: Banco Provincia
National team
Years	Team	Caps	Goals
2013–	Argentina	174	(17)
Medal record
Olympic Games
Gold medal – first place	2016 Rio de Janeiro	Team
Pan American Games
Gold medal – first place	2019 Lima	Team
Pan American Cup
Gold medal – first place	2017 Lancaster

Ignacio Horacio Ortiz (born 26 July 1987) is an Argentine field hockey player who plays as a midfielder for Banco Provincia. He competed in the field hockey competition at the 2016 Summer Olympics, where he won the gold medal. He played club hockey for Real Club de Polo de Barcelona in Spain.

In July 2019, he was selected in the Argentina squad for the 2019 Pan American Games. They won the gold medal by defeating Canada 5–2 in the final.
