= Marc Serrahima =

Spanish field hockey player (born 1995)

Personal information
- Full name: Marc Serrahima Castellà
- Born: 25 April 1995 (age 31)

Sport
- Sport: Field hockey
- Position: Defender
- Club: Junior FC
Senior career
Years	Team	Caps	Goals
–2020	Junior FC	-	-
2020–2023	HGC	-	-
2023–present	Junior FC	-	-
National team
Years	Team	Caps	Goals
2017–present	Spain	71	(4)
- Updated on 31 October 2023

Marc Serrahima Castellà (born 25 April 1995) is a Spanish field hockey player who plays as a defender for División de Honor club Junior FC and the Spanish national team.

== Club career ==
Serrahima played for Junior FC in Spain and in June 2020 it was announced he joined HGC in the Dutch Hoofdklasse for the 2020–21 season. After three seasons at HGC he returned to Junior FC.

== International career ==
Serrahima made his debut for the senior national team in June 2017 in a test match against Belgium. He represented Spain at the 2018 World Cup.
