= Glenn Schuurman =

Dutch field hockey player

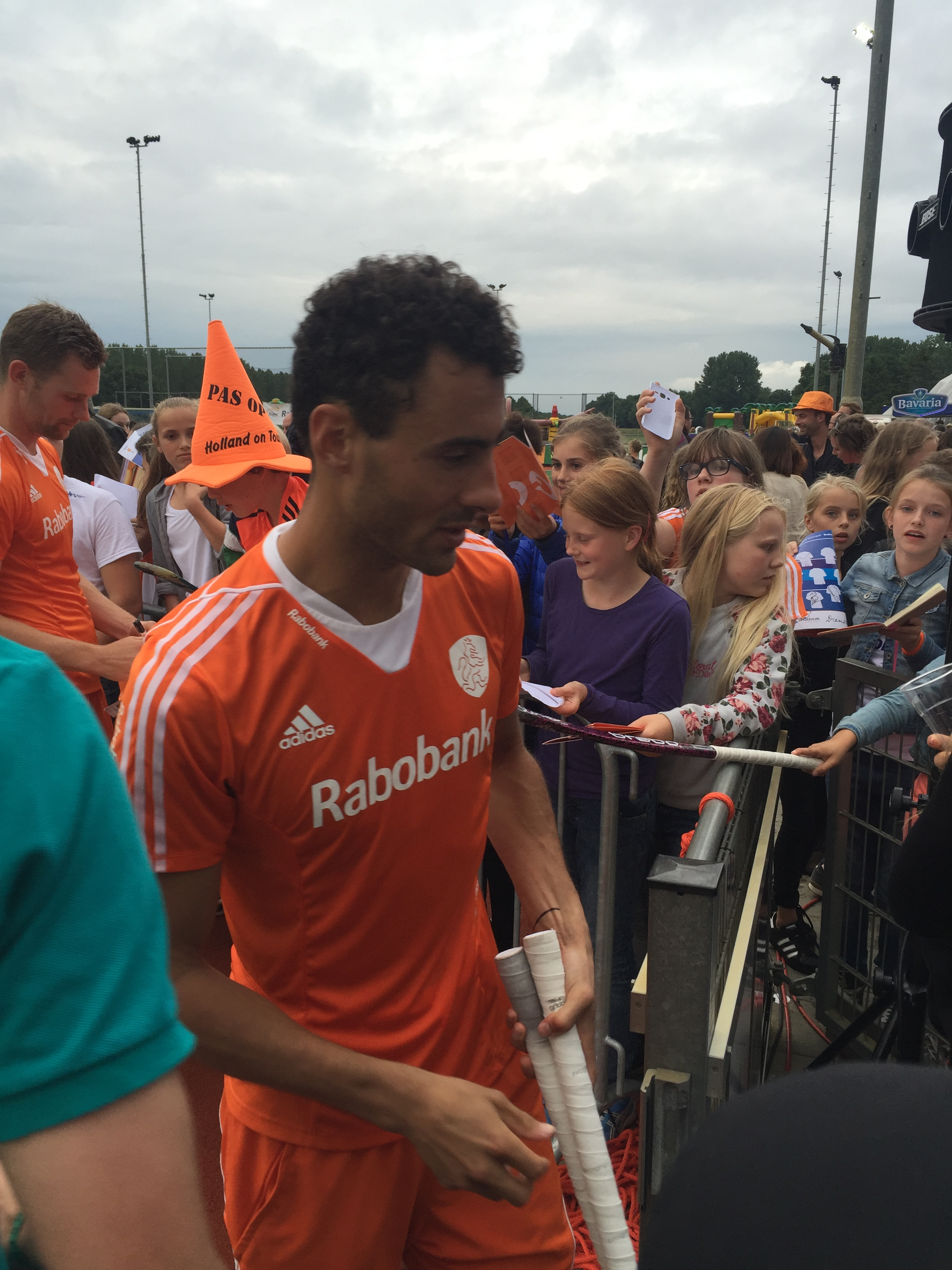

Personal information
- Born: 16 April 1991 (age 35) Boxtel, Netherlands
- Height: 1.83 m (6 ft 0 in)
- Weight: 79 kg (174 lb)

Sport
- Sport: Field hockey
- Position: Defender
Youth career
- Team
- –: MEP
Senior career
Years	Team	Caps	Goals
–2009	MEP	-	-
2009–2023	Bloemendaal	-	-
National team
Years	Team	Caps	Goals
2012–2021	Netherlands	159	(3)
Medal record
Men's Field hockey
Representing the Netherlands
World Cup
Silver medal – second place	2018 Bhubaneswar
EuroHockey Championship
Gold medal – first place	2015 London
Gold medal – first place	2017 Amstelveen
Gold medal – first place	2021 Amstelveen
Bronze medal – third place	2019 Antwerp
Champions Trophy
Silver medal – second place	2012 Melbourne
Bronze medal – third place	2018 Breda
EuroHockey Junior Championship
Silver medal – second place	2012 's-Hertogenbosch

Glenn Schuurman (Dutch pronunciation: [ɡlɛn ˈsxyːrmɑn]; born 16 April 1991) is a Dutch former field hockey player who played as a defender or midfielder. He played a total 159 matches from 2012 until 2021 for the Dutch national team and scored three goals.

He participated at the 2016 Summer Olympics.

== Club career ==
He was born in Boxtel in the Netherlands, where he started playing hockey for the local hockey club MEP. In 2009 he transferred to Bloemendaal where he won the Dutch national title in 2010. In the 2018–19 season, he won his second national title with Bloemendaal by defeating Kampong in the championship final. The lost championship final against Pinoké in the 2022–23 season was his last match in the Bloemendaal team as he retired.

== International career ==
Schuurman made his debut for the Dutch national team in 2012 in a friendly match against England. The following tournament, the 2012 Champions Trophy, they finished second and he won his first medal with the national team. At the 2018 Champions Trophy in Breda he played his 100th match for the Dutch national team.In June 2019, he was selected in the Netherlands squad for the 2019 EuroHockey Championship. They won the bronze medal by defeating Germany 4–0. After the 2020 Summer Olympics, he announced his retirement from international hockey.

== Honours ==
Bloemendaal

- Euro Hockey League: 2012–13, 2017–18, 2021, 2022, 2022–23
- Hoofdklasse: 2009–10, 2018–19, 2020–21, 2021–22

Netherlands

- EuroHockey Championship: 2015, 2017, 2021
