= Luke Taylor (field hockey) =

English field hockey player (born 1994)

Personal information
- Born: 15 September 1994 (age 31)
- Height: 1.85 m (6 ft 1 in)

Sport
- Sport: Field hockey
- Position: Defender
Senior career
| Years | Team | Caps | Goals |
| 2011–2014 | East Grinstead | - | - |
| 2014–2016 | Loughborough Students | - | - |
| 2016–2017 | East Grinstead | - | - |
| 2017–2026 | Surbiton | - | - |
National team
| Years | Team | Caps | Goals |
| 2013–2015 | England & GB U21 | 31 | (30) |
| 2017–2022 | England and GB | 38 | (10) |
Medal record
Men's field hockey
Representing England
EuroHockey Junior Championship
| Bronze medal – third place | 2014 Waterloo |

Luke Taylor (born 15 September 1994) is an English field hockey player who played as a defender and penalty corner specialist for England and Great Britain national teams.

== Biography ==
Taylor was educated at Whitgift School and Loughborough University.

He played club hockey for East Grinstead in the Men's England Hockey League and played for England U21 at the Junior World Cup in 2013 and won a European Championships U21 bronze medal in 2014. He captained GB U21s to success in the Sultan of Johor Cup, in October 2015, finishing as the competition's top-scorer. He joined Loughborough Students while at University before returning to East Grinstead.

He made his senior debut for England in August 2017 against the Netherlands, in Spain. In 2017 Taylor joined Surbiton and soon after scored on his debut for Great Britain against Germany in November 2017. He was selected for the Great Britain team for the 2018 Men's Hockey World Cup.

In 2022, Taylor stepped away from the international scene to concentrate on his business interests. Taylor was part of the Surbiton squad that won the league title during the 2024–25 Men's England Hockey League season.
