= Stephen Jenness =

New Zealand field hockey player

Personal information
- Born: 7 June 1990 (age 36) Lower Hutt, New Zealand
- Height: 1.79 m (5 ft 10 in)
- Weight: 76 kg (168 lb)

Sport
- Sport: Field hockey
- Position: Forward
- Club: Central Falcons
National team
Years	Team	Caps	Goals
–	New Zealand	254	(92)
Medal record
Men's field hockey
Representing New Zealand
Commonwealth Games
Silver medal – second place	2018 Gold Coast	Team
Bronze medal – third place	2010 Delhi	Team
Oceania Cup
Silver medal – second place	2019 Rockhampton

Stephen Jenness (born 7 June 1990) is a New Zealand field hockey player. At the 2012 and 2016 Summer Olympics, he competed for the national team in the men's tournament.

He was part of the New Zealand teams that won silver at the 2018 Commonwealth Games, and bronze at the 2010 Commonwealth Games. He has also played at the 2011 and 2012 Champions Trophies. He made his debut for the national team in 2010, having taken up hockey at school at the age of 7.
