= Bjorn Kellerman =

Dutch field hockey player (born 1990)

Personal information
- Born: 25 May 1990 (age 36) Ede, Netherlands

Sport
- Sport: Field hockey
- Position: Forward
Youth career
- Team
- –: Zeewolde
Senior career
Years	Team	Caps	Goals
–2009	Amersfoort	-	-
2009–2012	SCHC	-	-
2012–2015	Rotterdam	-	-
2015–2022	Kampong	-	-
2022	Acme Chattogram	-	-
National team
Years	Team	Caps	Goals
2015	Netherlands (indoor)	8	(12)
2015–2021	Netherlands	69	(28)
Medal record
Representing the Netherlands
Men's field hockey
EuroHockey Championship
Gold medal – first place	2017 Amstelveen
Bronze medal – third place	2019 Antwerp
EuroHockey Junior Championship
Gold medal – first place	2010 Siemianowice Śląskie
Men's indoor hockey
Indoor World Cup
Gold medal – first place	2015 Leipzig

Bjorn Kellerman (born 25 May 1990) is a Dutch former field hockey player who played as a forward.

== Club career ==
Kellerman started playing hockey at Zeewolde. He then played for Amersfoort and in 2009 he moved to SCHC. After three seasons with SCHC he made a transfer to Rotterdam. With Rotterdam he won their first national title in the 2012–13 season. In 2015, he moved to Kampong, where he won the Euro Hockey League in his first season. In January 2022, he announced he would leave Kampong after seven years at the end of the season.

== International career ==
Kellerman was a part of the Dutch squad which won the Indoor World Championship in 2015. He made his debut for the national team at the 2015 Hockey World League Final. He won the European title in 2017 and in June 2019, he was selected in the Netherlands squad for the 2019 EuroHockey Championship. They won the bronze medal by defeating Germany 4–0. In September 2021 he announced his retirement from the national team after he was dropped for the 2020 Summer Olympics squad in June.

== Honours ==
=== International ===
Netherlands U21

- EuroHockey Junior Championship: 2010

Netherlands

- EuroHockey Championship: 2017
- Indoor World Cup: 2015

=== Club ===
Rotterdam

- Hoofdklasse: 2012–13

Kampong

- Euro Hockey League: 2015–16
- Hoofdklasse: 2016–17, 2017–18

Acme Chattogram

- Hockey Champions Trophy Bangladesh: 2022
