= Josep Romeu =

Spanish field hockey player (born 1990)

Personal information
- Full name: Josep Romeu Argemi
- Born: 22 May 1990 (age 36) Barcelona, Spain
- Height: 1.75 m (5 ft 9 in)
- Weight: 77 kg (170 lb)

Sport
- Sport: Field hockey
- Position: Defender
Senior career
Years	Team	Caps	Goals
–2016	Club Egara	-	-
2016–2018	Leuven	-	-
2018–2021	Club Egara	-	-
National team
Years	Team	Caps	Goals
2014–2021	Spain	152	(24)
Medal record
Men's field hockey
Representing Spain
EuroHockey Championship
Silver medal – second place	2019 Antwerp

Josep Romeu Argemi (born 22 May 1990) is a Spanish former field hockey player who played as a defender for the Spanish national team.

At the 2016 Summer Olympics, he competed for the national team in the men's tournament. He played club hockey in Belgium for KHC Leuven and Club Egara in Spain.

== International career ==
Josep has been playing for the national team since 2014 when he made his debut in a test match against Great Britain. He was part of the Spain squad that finished thirteenth at the 2018 World Cup. He scored one goal in three games in that tournament. At the 2019 EuroHockey Championship, he won his first medal with the national team as they finished second. On 25 May 2021, he was selected in the squad for the 2021 EuroHockey Championship. After the 2020 Summer Olympics he retired from the national team after having achieved a 152 caps.
