= Chris Griffiths (field hockey) =

English field hockey player (born 1990)

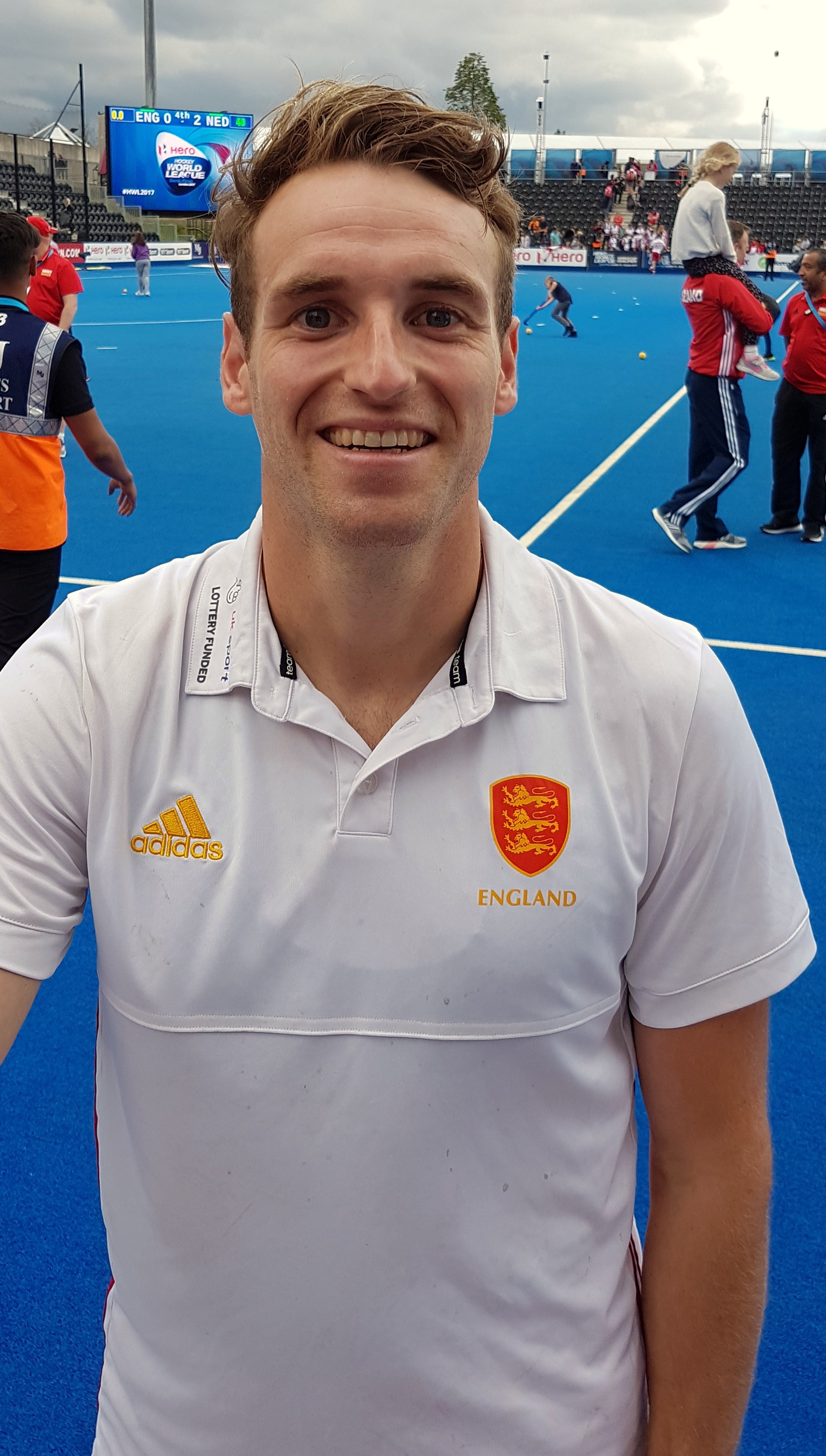

Personal information
- Born: 3 September 1990 (age 35) Birmingham, England
- Height: 1.79 m (5 ft 10 in)

Sport
- Sport: Field hockey
- Position: Forward
Senior career
| Years | Team | Caps | Goals |
| –2014 | Loughborough Students | - | - |
| 2014–2020 | East Grinstead | - | - |
| 2020–2026 | Old Georgians | - | - |
National team
| Years | Team | Caps | Goals |
| 2014–present | England & GB | 111 | (26) |
Medal record
Men's field hockey
Representing England
EuroHockey Championship
| Bronze medal – third place | 2017 Amstelveen |
Commonwealth Games
| Bronze medal – third place | 2018 Gold Coast | Team |
| Bronze medal – third place | 2022 Birmingham | Team |

Christopher Griffiths (born 3 September 1990), known as Chris Griffiths, is an English field hockey player who plays as a forward for Old Georgians and the England and Great Britain national teams. He competed at the 2020 Summer Olympics.

== Biography ==
Griffiths joined East Grinstead in May 2014 ahead of the 2014–15 season, having previously played for and captained Loughborough Students. While at East Grinstead he represented England at the 2018 Commonwealth Games in Gold Coast.

In 2020, Griffths joined Old Georgians in the Men's England Hockey League Premier Division. He was selected to represent Great Britain for the delayed 2020 Olympic Games in Tokyo and won a bronze medal with England in the Men's tournament at the 2022 Commonwealth Games in Birmingham.

Griffiths helped Old Georgians win the league and cup double during the 2023-24 season.
