= Álvaro Iglesias (field hockey) =

Spanish field hockey player

Personal information
- Full name: Álvaro Iglesias Marcos
- Born: 1 March 1993 (age 33) Madrid, Spain
- Height: 1.78 m (5 ft 10 in)
- Weight: 79 kg (174 lb)

Sport
- Sport: Field hockey
- Position: Midfielder / Forward
- Club: Club de Campo
Senior career
Years	Team	Caps	Goals
2010–2013	Club de Campo	-	-
2013–2014	Dragons	-	-
2014–present	Club de Campo	-	-
National team
Years	Team	Caps	Goals
2013–2014	Spain U21	15	(2)
2014–present	Spain	194	(34)
Medal record
Men's field hockey
Representing Spain
EuroHockey Championship
Silver medal – second place	2019 Antwerp
Bronze medal – third place	2025 Mönchengladbach
- Updated on 1 February 2023

Álvaro Iglesias Marcos (born 1 March 1993) is a Spanish field hockey player who plays as a midfielder or forward for División de Honor club Club de Campo and the Spain national team.

At the 2016 Summer Olympics, he competed for the national team in the men's tournament.

== International career ==
Álvaro played for the Spain U21 team from 2013 until 2014 before he made his debut for the main team in 2014 in a test match against Great Britain. He was part of the Spain squad that finished thirteenth at the 2018 World Cup. He scored two goals in three games in that tournament. At the 2019 EuroHockey Championship, he won his first medal with the national team as they finished second. On 25 May 2021, he was selected in the squad for the 2021 EuroHockey Championship.
