= Ricardo Sánchez (field hockey) =

Spanish field hockey player (born 1992)

Personal information
- Full name: Ricardo Sánchez Herrero
- Born: 4 December 1992 (age 33) Madrid, Spain
- Height: 1.81 m (5 ft 11 in)

Sport
- Sport: Field hockey
- Position: Defender / midfielder
- Club: Club de Campo
Youth career
- Team
- –: Complutense
Senior career
Years	Team	Caps	Goals
–2016	Complutense	-	-
2016–2018	Leuven	-	-
2018–2019	Gantoise	-	-
2019–2020	Complutense	-	-
2020–present	Club de Campo	-	-
National team
Years	Team	Caps	Goals
2013	Spain U21	10	-
2014–2022	Spain	124	(9)
Medal record
Men's field hockey
Representing Spain
EuroHockey Championship
Silver medal – second place	2019 Antwerp

Ricardo Sánchez Herrero (born 4 December 1992) is a Spanish field hockey player who plays as a defender or midfielder for Club de Campo. He played a total of 124 matches for the Spanish national team and scored ten goals from 2014 until 2022.

== Club career ==
Complutense was the only club he ever played for until he moved to Belgium to play for Leuven in 2016. In 2018, he switched to another Belgian club Gantoise. After one season with Gantoise, he returned to Complutense. In June 2020 it was announced he left Complutense for the other Madrid-based club Club de Campo. In his second season at the club, Club de Campo won their first ever Spanish national title.

== International career ==
Sánchez made his debut for the senior national team in November 2014 in a test match against Great Britain. Initially, he was not selected for the 2018 World Cup but he replaced Miquel Delas later in the tournament who had to withdraw injured. At the 2019 EuroHockey Championship, he won his first medal with the national team as they finished second. On 25 May 2021, he was selected in the squad for the 2021 EuroHockey Championship. In July 2023 he retired from the national team.
