= 2016 Men's Hockey Junior World Cup squads =

This article lists the confirmed squads for the 2016 Men's Hockey Junior World Cup tournament held in Lucknow, India between 8 and 18 December 2016. The eight national teams were required to register a playing squad of eighteen players.

== Pool A ==
=== Argentina ===
The following was the Argentina squad for the 2016 Junior World Cup.

Head coach: Mariano Ronconi

1. Emiliano Bosso (GK)
2. Agustín Machelett
4. Matias Bustos
5. Thomas Habif
6. Santiago Tarazona
7. Maico Casella (C)
8. Ignacio Nepote
9. Nicolás Acosta
10. Agustín Bugallo
11. Martín Ferreiro
12. Ignacio Correa (GK)
13. Agustín Rios
14. Ladislao Gencarelli
15. Federico Moreschi
16. Joaquín Puglisi
17. Nicolás Keenan
18. Tomás Domene
22. Eugenio Balboa

=== Australia ===
The following was the Australia squad for the 2016 Junior World Cup.

Head coach: Ben Bishop

1. Kiran Arunasalam
2. Tim Howard
3. Blake Govers
4. Matthew Bird
5. Matthew Finn (GK)
6. Max Hendry
7. Stephen Gale
8. Ryan Proctor
9. Kurt Lovett
10. Frazer Gerrard
12. Joshua Simmonds
13. Jack Welch
18. Corey Weyer
22. Samuel Liles (C)
23. Tom Craig
25. Joshua Beltz
28. Lachlan Sharp
31. Ashleigh Thomas (GK)

=== Austria ===
The following was the Austria squad for the 2016 Junior World Cup.

Head coach: (India) Cedric D'Souza

1. Lukas Glaser (GK)
2. Philip Schmidt
7. Franz Lindengrun
8. Phillip Schippan
9. Pit Rudofsky
10. Fabian Unterkircher
12. Lorenz Klimon
13. Oliver Binder
14. Christoph Soldat
15. Florian Steyrer
18. Jakob Puchhammer
19. Tobias Mayer
21. Paul Supper
23. Marcel Hilbert
24. Leon Thörnblom (C)
26. Jan Abel
27. Peter Kaltenböck
32. Christoph Sandbichler (GK)

=== South Korea ===
The following was the South Korea squad for the 2016 Junior World Cup.

Head coach: Jang Jung-min

1. Kang Young-bin (GK)
2. Lee Gang-san
3. Park Joo-han
5. Kim Hyeon-hong (C)
6. Yoon Hyo-sang
7. Seo Wooh-yeong
8. Hwang Man-gi
9. Kim Geun-yub
10. Sim Jae-won
11. Kim Kyu-beom
14. Yang Hyeon-jun
15. Choi Jin-young
17. Lee Hyun-il
18. Oh Se-yong
21. Kim Jae-han (GK)
22. Kim Ho-min
25. Jung Kyung-seop
26. Hong Yong-min

== Pool B ==
=== Belgium ===
The following was the Belgium squad for the 2016 Junior World Cup.

Head coach: Jeroen Baart

1. Loic Van Doren (GK)
2. Charles Masset (GK)
3. Arthur De Sloover
4. Marco Donck
6. Fabrice Van Bockrijck
7. Victor Wegnez
9. Alexandre Van Linthoudt
10. Antoine Kina
11. Philippe Simar
13. Nicolas Poncelet
14. Robbert Rubens
15. Augustin Meurmans
16. Thomas Verheijen
17. Martin Lambeau
18. Henri Raes
20. Quentin Van Lierde
21. Gregory Stockbroekx
22. Alexis Lemaire

=== Egypt ===
The following was the Egypt squad for the 2016 Junior World Cup.

Head coach: Sayed El Bediwy

1. Ahmed Ezzat (GK)
2. Ahmed Ashraf
4. Mostafa Zeidan
5. Mohamed Ghoneim
6. Mohamed Gadelkarim
7. Ahmed Basha
8. Abdelrahman Kasem (C)
11. Ibrahim Salah
13. Abdelrahman Yossri
14. Mohamed Ali
15. Mohamed Nasr
17. Zeiad Esmat
19. Zakaria Mohamed
21. Ahmed El Ganaini
22. Mohamed Adel
24. Moustafa Tarek
26. Ahmed Adel (GK)
27. Mostafa Ragab

=== Malaysia ===
The following was the Malaysia squad for the 2016 Junior World Cup.

Head coach: Wallace Tan

1. Mohamad Baharom
2. Najib Hassan (C)
3. Amirol Arshad
5. Firdaus Omar
6. Zulhamizan Mohamad
7. Muhammad Zaidi
8. Aiman Rozemi
9. Luqman Ahmad Shukran
11. Norsyafiq Sumantri
13. Rafizul Mustafa
14. Syed Cholan
15. Khaliq Hamirin
17. Ashran Hamsani
18. Zul Pidus Mizan
20. Adrian Albert (GK)
24. Muhammad Fauzi
25. Najmi Jazlan
26. Mat Deris Zaimi (GK)

=== Netherlands ===
The following was the Netherlands squad for the 2016 Junior World Cup.

Head coach: Eric Verboom

1. Maurits Visser (GK)
2. Jip Janssen
3. Sebastian van der Graaf
5. Niek Merkus
6. Lars Balk (C)
7. Daniel Aarts
8. Joep de Mol
9. Noud Schoenaker
10. Thierry Brinkman
11. Thijs van Dam
12. Jonas de Geus
13. Joren Romijn (GK)
14. Jorrit Croon
16. Terrance Pieters
17. Bram van Groesen
18. Steijn van Heijningen
21. Morris de Vilder
24. Floris Wortelboer

== Pool C ==
=== Germany ===
The following was the Germany squad for the 2016 Junior World Cup.

Head coach: Valentin Altenburg

1. Lennart Küppers (GK)
4. Ferdinand Weinke
5. Lukas Windfeder
7. Tino Nguyen
8. Anton Böckel
9. Henning Hüttermann
10. Maximilian Werner
11. Constantin Staib (C)
12. Timm Herzbruch
13. Nils Grünenwald
14. Julius Meyer
15. Florian Scholten
17. Thies Prinz
20. Niklas Bosserhoff
23. Johannes Große
27. Jan Schiffer
30. Philip Schmid
31. Niklas Garst (GK)

=== Japan ===
The following was the Japan squad for the 2016 Junior World Cup.

Head coach: Kyoichi Nagaya

1. Hiroki Nakagami (GK)
3. Koyo Kameyama
4. Miyu Tanimitsu
5. Tatsunori Kondo
6. Shuhei Hatano
7. Takehiro Chiba
8. Takumi Ineyama
10. Ryo Arai
11. Shinichi Kamezaki
12. Kaito Tanaka
13. Mizuki Ikeda
15. Soma Hayashi
16. Ryo Ozawa (C)
17. Koji Yamasaki
18. Atsushi Sugiyama
21. Takumi Chida (GK)
22. Kentaro Fukuda
23. Kota Watanabe

=== New Zealand ===
The following was the New Zealand squad for the 2016 Junior World Cup.

Head coach: Bryce Collins

1. Thomas Mallon (GK)
5. David Brydon
6. Jonty Keaney
7. Leo Mitai-Wells
9. Hugh Hendrickson
10. Kieran O'Connor
11. Samuel Lane
12. Robbie Capizzi
13. Oliver Logan
14. Bradley Read (C)
15. Dominic Newman
16. Aidan Sarikaya
17. Dylan Thomas
18. Jonathan Thorn
19. Mackenzie Wilcox
20. Dominic Dixon (GK)
23. Nicholas Woods
25. Samuel Hiha

=== Spain ===
The following was the Spain squad for the 2016 Junior World Cup.

Head coach: Roger Pallarols

1. Albert Pérez (GK)
2. Pol Gispert
3. Ignasi Torras
4. Pablo de Abadal
5. Marc Serrahima
7. Enrique González (C)
8. Maunel Bordas
9. Guillermo Puente
10. Marc Boltó
11. Lucas García Alcade
13. Llorenç Piera
14. Oriol Salvador
15. Marc Perellon
18. Pol Parrilla
19. Jan Lara
21. Alberto Carnicer (GK)
23. Joan Tarrés
24. Ignacio Rodríguez

== Pool D ==
=== Canada ===
The following was the Canada squad for the 2016 Junior World Cup.

Head coach: Indy Sehmbi

2. Thomson Harris
3. Brandon Pereira (C)
4. Harbir Sidhu
5. Parmeet Gill
7. Rohan Chopra
8. Rajan Kahlon
9. Kabir Ajula
10. Balraj Panesar (C)
11. Floyd Mascarenhas
13. Fin Boothroyd
17. Jamie Wallace
18. Ganga Singh
20. Gavin Bains
21. Rowan Childs
22. Arshjit Sidhu
24. Michael Mackenzie (GK)
31. Angus Grauer (GK)
32. Iqwiner Gill

=== England ===
The following was the England squad for the 2016 Junior World Cup.

Head coach: Jon Bleby

1. Chris Wyver (GK)
2. Toby Reynolds-Cotterill (GK)
3. Robert Gleeson
4. Jonathan Griffiths
5. Tom Sorsby
8. Will Calnan
9. Jack Turner
10. James Gall (C)
11. Ed Horler
12. Peter Scott
13. Edward Way
14. James Albery
15. Jack Waller
18. James Simpson
19. Jack Clee
20. Rhys Smith
21. Christopher Proctor
22. Liam Sanford

=== India ===
The following was the India squad for the 2016 Junior World Cup.

Head coach: Harendra Singh

1. Harmanpreet Singh
4. Vikramjit Singh
7. Varun Kumar
8. Simranjeet Singh
9. Krishan Pathak (GK)
10. Armaan Qureshi
11. Mandeep Singh
12. Dipsan Tirkey
13. Parvinder Singh
14. Manpreet (Jnr)
15. Gurjant Singh
16. Sumit
17. Santa Singh
19. Vikas Dahiya (GK)
21. Harjeet Singh (C)
23. Gurinder Singh
27. Nilakanta Sharma
32. Ajit Pandey

=== South Africa ===
The following was the South Africa squad for the 2016 Junior World Cup.

Head coach: Garreth Ewing

1. Robert McKinley (GK)
3. Tyson Dlungwana
4. Kyle Lion-Cachet
6. Tylo Remke
7. Matthew de Sousa
8. Nduduza Lembethe
9. Charlie Bowren
10. Ryan Julius
11. Alex Stewart (C)
12. Walter Pfaff
13. Khumo Mokale
17. Amkelwe Letuka
18. Siya Nolutshungu (GK)
19. Jason Reed
20. Tevin Kok
21. Courtney Halle
27. Nqobile Ntuli
32. Ryan Crowe
