= 2014 Men's EuroHockey Junior Championship =

Hockey tournament

2014 Men's Junior EuroHockey Championship
Tournament details
- Host country: Belgium
- City: Waterloo
- Dates: 20–26 July
- Teams: 8 (from 1 confederation)

Final positions
- Champions: Netherlands (8th title)
- Runner-up: Germany
- Third place: England

Tournament statistics
- Matches played: 20
- Goals scored: 100 (5 per match)
- Top scorer(s): (Belgium) Alexander Hendrickx (Germany) Tom Grambusch (Spain) Eduardo Garriga (6 goals)

The 2014 Men's EuroHockey Junior Championship was the 17th edition of the men's EuroHockey Junior Championship, the biennial international men's under-21 field hockey championship of Europe organized by the European Hockey Federation. It was held alongside the women's tournament in Waterloo, Belgium between 20 and 26 July 2014.

The tournament served as a qualifier for the 2016 Men's Hockey Junior World Cup, held in Lucknow, India in December 2016.

Netherlands won the tournament for the eighth time by defeating Germany 5–2 in the final. England won the bronze medal by defeating the defending champions Belgium 4–3 in a shoot-out following a 1–1 draw.

== Qualified teams ==
Dates	Event	Location	Quotas	Qualifiers
26 August – 1 September 2012	2012 EuroHockey Junior Championship	's-Hertogenbosch, Netherlands	6	Belgium; England; France; Germany; Netherlands; Spain
15–21 July 2012	2012 EuroHockey Junior Championship II	Cernusco, Italy	2	Austria; Poland
Total			8	

== Results ==
=== Preliminary round ===
==== Pool A ====
Pos	Team	Pld	W	D	L	GF	GA	GD	Pts	Qualification
1	England	3	3	0	0	14	2	+12	9	Semi-finals
2	Belgium (H)	3	2	0	1	10	1	+9	6	Semi-finals
3	France	3	1	0	2	3	12	−9	3	Pool C
4	Poland	3	0	0	3	4	16	−12	0	Pool C

Source: FIH
(H) Hosts

20 July 2014
16:45

France	3–2	Poland
Charlet 28', 45', 48'	Report	Hulboj 57'; Lewartowski 61'

Umpires:
Stefan Leiber (GER)
Jhonatan Gomez (ESP)

20 July 2014
17:15

Belgium	0–1	England
	Report	Taylor 15'

Umpires:
Jasper Nagtzaam (NED)
Ahmed Elsayed Ahmed (EGY)

22 July 2014
18:45

England	6–2	Poland
Drayton-Chana 19'; Taylor 21', 62', 65'; French 38'; Goodfield 57'	Report	Gruszczynski 44'; Chwalisz 70+'

Umpires:
Jasper Nagtzaam (NED)
Roland Langer (AUT)

22 July 2014
19:15

France	0–3	Belgium
	Report	Hendrickx 29'; Saeys 57'; Rombouts 70+'

Umpires:
Gavin Cruickshanks (SCO)
Jhonatan Gomez (ESP)

23 July 2014
18:45

England	7–0	France
Farrington 16'; Albery 29'; Goodfield 35+'; Boon 39'; Horler 43'; Griffiths 57'; French 70+'	Report

Umpires:
Ahmed Alseyed Ahmed (EGY)
Roland Langer (AUT)

23 July 2014
19:15

Belgium	7–0	Poland
Hendrickx 9', 59'; Cobbaert 27'; De Kerpel 35+'; Verheijen 46'; Linthoudt 53'; Degroote 63'	Report

Umpires:
Jasper Nagtzaam (NED)
Stefan Leiber (GER)

==== Pool B ====
Pos	Team	Pld	W	D	L	GF	GA	GD	Pts	Qualification
1	Germany	3	1	2	0	10	3	+7	5	Semi-finals
2	Netherlands	3	1	2	0	7	5	+2	5	Semi-finals
3	Spain	3	1	2	0	8	7	+1	5	Pool C
4	Austria	3	0	0	3	3	13	−10	0	Pool C

Source: FIH

20 July 2014
12:15

Netherlands	3–3	Spain
J. Luijkx 11'; Brinkman 18' van Groesen 60'	Report	Beltran 1'; Bolto 46'; Garriga 62'

Umpires:
Marc Knulle (FRA)
Bruce Bale (ENG)

20 July 2014
12:45

Germany	7–0	Austria
Wellen 10'; Grambusch 25'; Gomoll 52'; Windfeder 54', 64'; Hüttermann 67'; Staib 70+'	Report

Umpires:
Gavin Cruickshanks (SCO)
Nathan Steiner (BEL)

22 July 2014
16:30

Spain	3–2	Austria
Iglesias 23'; Cañas 48'; González 55'	Report	Binder 34'; Podpera 40'

Umpires:
Marc Knulle (FRA)
Lukasz Zwierzchowski (POL)

22 July 2014
17:00

Germany	1–1	Netherlands
Grambusch 35+'	Report	Brinkman 48'

Umpires:
Ahmed Elsayed Ahmed (EGY)
Bruce Bale (ENG)

23 July 2014
14:15

Netherlands	3–1	Austria
Vos 12'; Brinkman 67', 70+'	Report	Podpera 60'

Umpires:
Ahmed Elsayed Ahmed (EGY)
Lukasz Zwierzchowski (POL)

23 July 2014
14:45

Spain	2–2	Germany
González 39'; Garriga 67'	Report	Grambusch 49', 60'

Umpires:
Bruce Bale (ENG)
Nathan Steiner (BEL)

=== Fifth to eighth place classification ===
==== Pool C ====
The points obtained in the preliminary round against the other team were taken over.

Pos	Team	Pld	W	D	L	GF	GA	GD	Pts	Relegation
5	Spain	3	3	0	0	16	4	+12	9	
6	Austria	3	1	1	1	7	6	+1	4	
7	France	3	1	1	1	6	9	−3	4	EuroHockey Junior Championship II
8	Poland	3	0	0	3	4	14	−10	0	EuroHockey Junior Championship II

Source: FIH

25 July 2014
13:00

Poland	1–3	Austria
Lewartowski 50'	Report	Podpera 25'; Lindengrun 40'; Thörnblom 65'

Umpires:
Stefan Leiber (GER)
Jhonatan Gomez (ESP)

25 July 2014
13:30

France	1–5	Spain
Lockwood 59'	Report	Garriga 3', 22'; Bolto 41'; López-Alonso 65'; Farres 70+'

Umpires:
Stefan Leiber (GER)
Jhonatan Gomez (ESP)

26 July 2014
11:00

Poland	1–8	Spain
Jarzembowski 64'	Report	Garriga 8', 40'; Ursul 34'; Beltran 36'; San Martin 51'; Farres 54'; Bolto 68'; Parente 70+'

Umpires:
Stefan Leiber (GER)
Jhonatan Gomez (ESP)

26 July 2014
11:30

France	2–2	Austria
Kieffer 27'; Peters-Deutz 68'	Report	Binder 17'; Rudofsky 41'

Umpires:
Gavin Cruickshanks (SCO)
Ahmed Elsayed Ahmed (EGY)

=== First to fourth place classification ===
Semi-finals
25 July
Germany (s.o)	3 (3)
Belgium	3 (2)
25 July
England	1
Netherlands	2

Final
26 July
Germany	2
Netherlands	5
Third place
26 July
Belgium	1 (3)
England (s.o)	1 (4)

==== Semi-finals ====
25 July 2014
17:30

England	1–2	Netherlands
Drayton-Chana 37'	Report	Hiebendaal 2', 63'

Umpires:
Ahmed Elsayed Ahmed (EGY)
Marc Knulle (FRA)

25 July 2014
20:00

Germany	3–3	Belgium
Grambusch 9', 59'; Gomoll 68'	Report	Hendrickx 41', 62', 70+'
Penalties
Kapaun (penalty shoot-out missed); Gomoll (penalty shoot-out scored); Nitschke (penalty shoot-out missed); Trompertz (penalty shoot-out scored); Herzbruch (penalty shoot-out scored)	3–2	(penalty shoot-out scored) Rubens; (penalty shoot-out missed) De Kerpel; (penalty shoot-out missed) Plennevaux; (penalty shoot-out scored) Wegnez; (penalty shoot-out missed) Cuvelier

Umpires:
Gavin Cruickshanks (SCO)
Lukasz Zwierzchowski (POL)

===== Third and fourth place =====
26 July 2014
17:00

Belgium	1–1	England
Degroote 21'	Report	Taylor 70+'
Penalties
Rubens (penalty shoot-out scored); Degroote (penalty shoot-out scored); Wegnez (penalty shoot-out missed); Saeys (penalty shoot-out scored); De Kerpel (penalty shoot-out missed)	3–4	(penalty shoot-out scored) Taylor; (penalty shoot-out scored) Goodfield; (penalty shoot-out scored) French; (penalty shoot-out missed) Farrington; (penalty shoot-out scored) Horler

Umpires:
Jasper Nagtzaam (NED)
Roland Langer (AUT)

===== Final =====
26 July 2014
18:00

Germany	2–5	Netherlands
Windfeder 52'; Grünenwald 67'	Report	J. Luijkx 21'; Warmerdam 36'; Brinkman 49'; P. Luijkx 58'; Hiebendaal 67'

Umpires:
Bruce Bale (ENG)
Lukasz Zwierzchowski (POL)

== Statistics ==
=== Final standings ===
Rank	Team
Gold medal	Netherlands
Silver medal	Germany
Bronze medal	England
4	Belgium
5	Spain
6	Austria
7	France
8	Poland

Qualified for the 2016 Junior World Cup

Relegated to the EuroHockey Junior Championship II
