= 2018 Men's Hockey Champions Trophy =

Field hockey tournament

Rabobank Hockey Champions Trophy Breda 2018

Tournament details
- Host country: Netherlands
- City: Breda
- Dates: 23 June – 1 July
- Teams: 6 (from 4 confederations)
- Venue(s): BH & BC Breda

Final positions
- Champions: Australia (15th title)
- Runner-up: India
- Third place: Netherlands

Tournament statistics
- Matches played: 18
- Goals scored: 69 (3.83 per match)
- Top scorer: (Argentina) Gonzalo Peillat (6 goals)
- Best player: (Australia) Aran Zalewski
- Best goalkeeper: (India) P. R. Sreejesh

The 2018 Men's Hockey Champions Trophy was the 37th and the last edition of the Hockey Champions Trophy for men. It was held from 23 June to 1 July 2018 in Breda, Netherlands. The tournament will be replaced by the Hockey Pro League (HPL) in 2019.

Australia won their 15th title by defeating India in the final after penalties.

== Qualification ==
Alongside the host nation, the defending champions, the last Olympic, World Cup and World League champions qualified automatically. The remaining spots were nominated by the FIH Executive Board, making a total of 6 competing teams. If teams qualified under more than one criterion, the additional teams were invited by the FIH Executive Board as well.

- Netherlands (Host nation)
- Australia (Defending champions and champions of the 2014 World Cup and 2016–17 World League)
- Argentina (Champions of 2016 Summer Olympics)
- Belgium (Invited by the FIH Executive Board)
- India (Invited by the FIH Executive Board)
- Pakistan (Invited by the FIH Executive Board)

== Squads ==
Argentina

Head coach: Germán Orozco

1. Juan Manuel Vivaldi (GK)
2. Gonzalo Peillat
4. Juan Ignacio Gilardi
5. Pedro Ibarra (C)
6. Santiago Tarazona
9. Maico Casella
10. Matías Paredes
11. Joaquín Menini
12. Lucas Vila
16. Ignacio Ortiz
17. Juan Martín López
18. Nicolás della Torre
20. Isidoro Ibarra
21. Tomás Santiago (GK)
22. Matías Rey
23. Lucas Martínez
24. Nicolas Cicileo
30. Agustín Bugallo
Australia

Head coach: Colin Batch

1. Lachlan Sharp
2. Tom Craig
4. Jake Harvie
7. Jeremy Edwards (C)
8. Johan Durst (GK)
11. Eddie Ockenden
12. Jake Whetton
13. Blake Govers
14. Aaron Kleinschmidt
16. Tim Howard
17. Aran Zalewski
20. Matthew Swann
22. Flynn Ogilvie
23. Daniel Beale
24. Tyler Lovell (GK)
25. Trent Mitton
29. Tim Brand
32. Jeremy Hayward
Belgium

Head coach: Shane McLeod

2. Loic van Doren (GK)
4. Arthur van Doren
6. Dorian Thiery
7. John-John Dohmen
8. Florent van Aubel
9. Sébastien Dockier
10. Cédric Charlier
11. Amaury Keusters
12. Gauthier Boccard
13. Nicolas de Kerpel
14. Augustin Meurmans
16. Alexander Hendrickx
17. Thomas Briels (C)
19. Felix Denayer
21. Vincent Vanasch (GK)
22. Simon Gougnard
23. Arthur de Sloover
24. Antoine Kina
25. Loïck Luypaert
26. Victor Wegnez
27. Tom Boon
32. Tanguy Cosyns
India

Head coach: Harendra Singh

1. Harmanpreet Singh
2. Dilpreet Singh
4. Jarmanpreet Singh
6. Surender Kumar
7. Manpreet Singh
8. Sardar Singh
10. Simranjeet Singh
11. Mandeep Singh
14. Lalit Upadhyay
16. P. R. Sreejesh (GK) (C)
19. Krishan Pathak (GK)
22. Varun Kumar
24. S. V. Sunil
26. Birendra Lakra
29. Chinglensana Singh
30. Amit Rohidas
31. Ramandeep Singh
32. Vivek Prasad
Netherlands

Head coach: Max Caldas

2. Jeroen Hertzberger
4. Lars Balk
5. Thijs van Dam
6. Jonas de Geus
7. Jorrit Croon
9. Seve van Ass (C)
10. Valentin Verga
11. Glenn Schuurman
13. Sander Baart
14. Robbert Kemperman
16. Mirco Pruyser
19. Bob de Voogd
22. Sam van der Ven
23. Joep de Mol
24. Roel Bovendeert
25. Thierry Brinkman
26. Pirmin Blaak (GK)
28. Floris Wortelboer
Pakistan

Head coach: Roelant Oltmans

1. Imran Butt (GK) (C)
2. Muhammad Aleem Bilal
3. Mubashar Ali
4. Muhammad Rizwan Sr.
5. Toseeq Arshad
6. Rashid Mehmood
7. Muhammad Qadir
8. Muhammad Irfan
9. Muhammad Dilber
10. Ali Shan
11. Muhammad Rizwan Jr.
12. Mazhar Abbas (GK)
13. Muhammad Irfan Jr.
14. Muhammad Umar Bhutta
16. Ammad Butt
17. Shafqat Rasool
19. Suhail Riaz
20. Ajaz Ahmad
21. Tasawar Abbas
22. Amjad Ali (GK)
27. Abu Bakar Mahmood
31. Muhammad Yaqoob

== Results ==
All times are local (UTC+2).

=== Standings ===
Pos	Team	Pld	W	D	L	GF	GA	GD	Pts	Qualification
1	Australia	5	3	1	1	13	10	+3	10	Final
2	India	5	2	2	1	10	6	+4	8	Final
3	Netherlands (H)	5	2	1	2	13	7	+6	7	Third place game
4	Argentina	5	2	1	2	8	10	−2	7	Third place game
5	Belgium	5	1	3	1	10	13	−3	6	Fifth place game
6	Pakistan	5	1	0	4	7	15	−8	3	Fifth place game

Source: FIH
Rules for classification: 1) points; 2) goal difference; 3) goals scored; 4) head-to-head result.
(H) Hosts

=== Results ===
23 June 2018
14:00

India	4–0	Pakistan
Ramandeep 26'; Dilpreet 54'; Mandeep 57'; Upadhyay 60'	Report

Umpires:
Christian Blasch (GER)
Coen van Bunge (NED)

23 June 2018
16:00

Netherlands	1–2	Argentina
Pruyser 14'	Report	Peillat 34'; Paredes 60'

Umpires:
Bruce Bale (ENG)
Jakub Mejzlík (CZE)

23 June 2018
18:00

Australia	3–3	Belgium
Mitton 20'; Sharp 21'; Whetton 50'	Report	Charlier 9'; De Sloover 37'; Boon 47'

Umpires:
Germán Montes de Oca (ARG)
Gareth Greenfield (NZL)

24 June 2018
12:00

India	2–1	Argentina
Harmanpreet 17'; Mandeep 28'	Report	Peillat 30'

Umpires:
Christian Blasch (GER)
Federico García (URU)

24 June 2018
14:00

Netherlands	6–1	Belgium
Van Ass 4'; Bovendeert 6', 6'; Hertzberger 22', 58'; Pruyser 29'	Report	Dohmen 41'

Umpires:
Bruce Bale (ENG)
Gareth Greenfield (NZL)

24 June 2018
16:00

Australia	2–1	Pakistan
Mitton 12'; Govers 56'	Report	Ahmad 9'

Umpires:
Sebastien Duterme (BEL)
Hideki Kinoshita (JPN)

26 June 2018
18:00

Argentina	1–1	Belgium
Peillat 14'	Report	Keusters 37'

Umpires:
Coen van Bunge (NED)
Bruce Bale (ENG)

26 June 2018
20:00

Netherlands	4–0	Pakistan
Kemperman 25'; Verga 29'; Van Dam 47'; Pruyser 50'	Report

Umpires:
Sebastien Duterme (BEL)
Federico García (URU)

27 June 2018
15:00

India	2–3	Australia
V. Kumar 10'; Harmanpreet 58'	Report	Sharp 6'; Craig 15'; Mitton 33'

Umpires:
Germán Montes de Oca (ARG)
Hideki Kinoshita (JPN)

28 June 2018
15:00

Argentina	1–4	Pakistan
Paredes 29'	Report	Irfan 10'; Ali 47'; Ahmad 49'; Bilal 58'

Umpires:
Hideki Kinoshita (JPN)
Sebastien Duterme (BEL)

28 June 2018
17:00

India	1–1	Belgium
Harmanpreet 10'	Report	Luypaert 59'

Umpires:
Coen van Bunge (NED)
Germán Montes de Oca (ARG)

28 June 2018
19:30

Netherlands	1–3	Australia
Pruyser 23'	Report	Harvie 30'; Govers 35', 55'

Umpires:
Christian Blasch (GER)
Gareth Greenfield (NZL)

29 June 2018
15:00

Belgium	4–2	Pakistan
Briels 36'; Keusters 39'; Charlier 51' van Aubel 54'	Report	Bilal 11', 38'

Umpires:
Bruce Bale (ENG)
Federico García (URU)

30 June 2018
14:00

Argentina	3–2	Australia
Peillat 13', 21', 51'	Report	Brand 16', 52'

Umpires:
Coen van Bunge (NED)
Sebastien Duterme (BEL)

30 June 2018
16:00

Netherlands	1–1	India
Brinkman 55'	Report	Mandeep 47'

Umpires:
Christian Blasch (GER)
Gareth Greenfield (NZL)

=== Classification ===
==== Fifth and sixth place ====
1 July 2018
11:30

Belgium	2–2	Pakistan
Boon 27' van Aubel 34'	Report	Shan 16'; Arshad 60'
Penalties
Gougnard (penalty shoot-out missed); Denayer (penalty shoot-out scored); Wegnez (penalty shoot-out missed); Van Doren (penalty shoot-out missed); De Sloover (penalty shoot-out scored)	2–1	(penalty shoot-out missed) Arshad; (penalty shoot-out scored) Mahmood; (penalty shoot-out missed) Bhutta; (penalty shoot-out missed) Shan; (penalty shoot-out missed) Rasool

Umpires:
Germán Montes de Oca (ARG)
Coen van Bunge (NED)

==== Third and fourth place ====
1 July 2018
13:45

Netherlands	2–0	Argentina
Hertzberger 47'; Pruyser 54'	Report

Umpires:
Federico García (URU)
Bruce Bale (ENG)

==== Final ====
1 July 2018
16:00

Australia	1–1	India
Govers 24'	Report	Prasad 42'
Penalties
Zalewski (penalty shoot-out scored); Beale (penalty shoot-out scored); Swann (penalty shoot-out missed); Craig (penalty shoot-out missed); Edwards (penalty shoot-out scored)	3–1	(penalty shoot-out missed) Sardar; (penalty shoot-out missed) Harmanpreet; (penalty shoot-out missed) Upadhyay; (penalty shoot-out scored) Manpreet

Umpires:
Gareth Greenfield (NZL)
Christian Blasch (GER)

== Statistics ==
=== Final standings ===
1. Australia
2. India
3. Netherlands
4. Argentina
5. Belgium
6. Pakistan

=== Awards ===
The following individual awards were given at the conclusion of the tournament.

Best Coach	Best Rising Player	Best Goalkeeper	Top Scorer	Best Player
(Australia) Colin Batch	(Australia) Jake Harvie	(India) P. R. Sreejesh	(Argentina) Gonzalo Peillat	(Australia) Aran Zalewski

=== Goalscorers ===
6 goals

- (Argentina) Gonzalo Peillat

5 goals

- (Netherlands) Mirco Pruyser

4 goals

- (Australia) Blake Govers

3 goals

- (Australia) Trent Mitton
- (India) Harmanpreet Singh
- (India) Mandeep Singh
- (Netherlands) Jeroen Hertzberger
- (Pakistan) Aleem Bilal

2 goals

- (Argentina) Matías Paredes
- (Australia) Tim Brand
- (Australia) Lachlan Sharp
- (Belgium) Tom Boon
- (Belgium) Cédric Charlier
- (Belgium) Amaury Keusters
- (Belgium) Florent van Aubel
- (Netherlands) Roel Bovendeert
- (Pakistan) Ajaz Ahmad

1 goal

- (Australia) Tom Craig
- (Australia) Jake Harvie
- (Australia) Jake Whetton
- (Belgium) Thomas Briels
- (Belgium) Arthur De Sloover
- (Belgium) John-John Dohmen
- (Belgium) Loïck Luypaert
- (India) Varun Kumar
- (India) Vivek Prasad
- (India) Dilpreet Singh
- (India) Ramandeep Singh
- (India) Lalit Upadhyay
- (Netherlands) Thierry Brinkman
- (Netherlands) Robbert Kemperman
- (Netherlands) Seve van Ass
- (Netherlands) Thijs van Dam
- (Netherlands) Valentin Verga
- (Pakistan) Mubashar Ali
- (Pakistan) Muhammad Irfan Jr.
- (Pakistan) Ali Shan
- (Pakistan) Toseeq Arshad
