= Sam van der Ven =

Dutch field hockey player

Personal information
- Born: 5 September 1989 (age 37) Voorburg, Netherlands

Sport
- Sport: Field hockey
- Position: Goalkeeper
Youth career
- Team
- –: Rijswijk
- –: HDM
Senior career
- Years: Team
- 2008–2024: HGC
- 2024–2025: SCHC
- 2026–present: Tilburg
National team
Years	Team	Caps	Goals
2014–2020	Netherlands	57	(0)
Medal record
Men's field hockey
Representing the Netherlands
World Cup
Silver medal – second place	2018 Bhubaneswar
EuroHockey Championship
Gold medal – first place	2017 Amstelveen
Bronze medal – third place	2019 Antwerp
Champions Trophy
Bronze medal – third place	2018 Breda

Sam van der Ven (born 5 September 1989) is a Dutch former field hockey player who played as a goalkeeper for HGC and the Dutch national team.

== Club career ==
Van der Ven started playing for Rijswijk and in the under-16's he switched to HDM. He played his whole senior career for HGC where he played for 16 years. His last games for HGC were the relegation play-offs in the 2023–24 season. During the 2024–25 season, he was the third goalkeeper of SCHC and during the 2026–27 season, he played some matches for Tilburg to replace the first goalkeeper who was injured.

== International career ==
Van der Ven made his debut for the Dutch national team in a test match against Belgium in 2014. He was a part of the Dutch squad which won the silver medal at the 2018 World Cup. In June 2019, he was selected as the joint first goalkeeper in the Netherlands squad for the 2019 EuroHockey Championship. They won the bronze medal by defeating Germany 4–0.
