= Arthur De Sloover =

Belgian field hockey player (born 1997)

Personal information
- Full name: Arthur Anne-Marie; Thierry De Sloover
- Born: 3 May 1997 (age 29) Kortrijk, Belgium
- Height: 1.79 m (5 ft 10 in)

Sport
- Sport: Field hockey
- Position: Defender
- Club: Oranje-Rood
Youth career
- Years: Team
- 2001–: Saint-Georges
Senior career
Years	Team	Caps	Goals
–2014	Saint-Georges	-	-
2014–2022	Beerschot	-	-
2022–present	Oranje-Rood	-	-
National team
Years	Team	Caps	Goals
2016	Belgium U21	10	(0)
2017–present	Belgium	110	(0)
Medal record
Men's field hockey
Representing Belgium
Olympic Games
Gold medal – first place	2020 Tokyo	Team
World Cup
Gold medal – first place	2018 Bhubaneswar
Silver medal – second place	2023 Bhubaneswar–Rourkela
EuroHockey Championship
Gold medal – first place	2019 Antwerp
Silver medal – second place	2017 Amstelveen
Bronze medal – third place	2021 Amstelveen
Bronze medal – third place	2023 Mönchengladbach
Junior World Cup
Silver medal – second place	2016 Lucknow

Arthur Anne-Marie Thierry De Sloover (born 3 May 1997) is a Belgian professional field hockey player who plays as a defender for Dutch Hoofdklasse club Oranje-Rood and the Belgium national team.

== Club career ==
De Sloover started playing hockey at the age of four. He played at Saint-Georges Hockey Club in Kortrijk from 2001 until 2014. He changed to Beerschot in the 2014–15 season. He was relegated with Beerschot in the 2021–22 season, after the relegation he joined Dutch side Oranje-Rood.

== International career ==
He was part of the Belgian under-21 selection that placed second at the 2016 Junior World Championship in Lucknow, India. He was part of the Belgian selection that placed second at the 2017 European Championship in Amstelveen, the Netherlands. He was part of the Belgian selection that won the 2018 Hockey World Cup in Bhubaneswar, India. At the 2018 Hockey Stars Awards, he was named the FIH Rising Star of the Year. In August 2019, he was selected in the Belgium squad for the 2019 EuroHockey Championship. They won Belgium its first European title by defeating Spain 5–0 in the final. On 25 May 2021, he was selected in the squad for the 2021 EuroHockey Championship.

== Personal life ==
Both of his parents, his grandfather, and his cousin Alix Gerniers are also active in professional hockey. Old hockey player Corneille Wellens was married to a first cousin of his great-grandfather Jules De Sloovere.

== Honours ==
Belgium

- Olympic gold medal: 2020
- World Cup: 2018
- EuroHockey Championship: 2019
- FIH Pro League: 2020–21

Individual

- FIH Rising Star of the Year: 2018

Preceded by Arthur Van Doren	FIH Rising Star of the Year; 2018	Succeeded by Vivek Prasad
