= Simranjeet Singh =

Indian field hockey player

Personal information
- Born: 27 December 1996 (age 29) Pilibhit, Uttar Pradesh, India
- Height: 173 cm (5 ft 8 in)

Sport
- Sport: Field hockey
- Position: Midfielder
- Club: Petroleum Sports Promotion Board
National team
Years	Team	Caps	Goals
2014–2016	India U21	11	(10)
2018–	India	56	(16)
2024–	India Hockey5s	6	(0)
Medal record
Men's field hockey
Representing India
Olympic Games
Bronze medal – third place	2020 Tokyo	Team
Asian Games
Bronze medal – third place	2018 Jakarta	Team
Asia Cup
Bronze medal – third place	2022 Jakarta
Champions Trophy
Silver medal – second place	2018 Breda
Junior World Cup
Gold medal – first place	2016 Lucknow
- Updated on 5 August 2021

Simranjeet Singh (born 27 December 1996) is an Indian field hockey player who plays as a midfielder for the Indian national team.

He was part of the Indian squad that won the 2016 Men's Hockey Junior World Cup. He made his senior team debut in 2018 and was part of India's silver medal-winning team at the 2018 Men's Hockey Champions Trophy.

Singh was trained at the Surjit Hockey Academy in Jalandhar. His cousin Gurjant Singh is also an international hockey player.
