= Loic Van Doren =

Belgian field hockey player

Loic van Doren
Personal information
- Full name: Loic Philippe Oscar; Serge Van Doren
- Born: 14 September 1996 (age 29) Antwerp, Belgium

Sport
- Sport: Field hockey
- Position: Goalkeeper
- Club: Dragons
Youth career
- Team
- –: Dragons
Senior career
Years	Team	Caps	Goals
–2018	Dragons	-	-
2018–2021	Den Bosch	-	-
2021–present	Dragons	-	-
National team
Years	Team	Caps	Goals
2014–2016	Belgium U21	12	(0)
2017–present	Belgium	75	(0)
Medal record
Men's field hockey
Representing Belgium
World Cup
Gold medal – first place	2018 Bhubaneswar
Silver medal – second place	2023 Bhubaneswar–Rourkela
EuroHockey Championship
Gold medal – first place	2019 Antwerp
Silver medal – second place	2017 Amstelveen
Bronze medal – third place	2021 Amstelveen
Bronze medal – third place	2023 Mönchengladbach
Junior World Cup
Silver medal – second place	2016 Lucknow

Loic Philippe Oscar Serge Van Doren (born 14 September 1996) is a Belgian professional field hockey player who plays as a goalkeeper for Dragons and the Belgium national team.

He is the brother of fellow Belgian international Arthur Van Doren.

== Club career ==
Van Doren came through the youth ranks of Dragons and played there for the senior team until 2018 when he transferred to Dutch club Den Bosch. After three seasons in Den Bosch he returned to Dragons for the 2021–22 season.

== International career ==
Van Doren played for the Belgian under-21 national team at the 2016 Junior World Cup, where they won the silver medal. He made his debut for the senior national team in a test match in South Africa. He was the second goalkeeper of the Belgian team that won the 2018 World Cup. He played in one game in the 2019 EuroHockey Championship, where Belgium won their first European title. On 25 May 2021, he was selected in the squad for the 2021 EuroHockey Championship.

== Honours ==
=== International ===
Belgium

- World Cup: 2018
- EuroHockey Championship: 2019
- FIH Pro League: 2020–21

=== Club ===
Dragons

- Belgian Hockey League: 2015–16, 2016–17, 2017–18
