= Varun Kumar (field hockey) =

Indian field hockey player

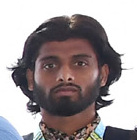
- Kumar in August 2022

Personal information
- Born: 25 July 1995 (age 31) Punjab, India
- Height: 1.72 m (5 ft 8 in)

Sport
- Sport: Field hockey
- Position: Defender
Senior career
Years	Team	Caps	Goals
–	Hockey Punjab	-	-
2014–2017	Punjab Warriors	-	-
2017–	BPCL	-	-
2024–	Delhi SG Pipers	-	-
National team
Years	Team	Caps	Goals
2014–2016	India U21		-
2017–	India	142	(39)
Medal record
Men's field hockey
Representing India
Olympic Games
Bronze medal – third place	2020 Tokyo	Team
Asian Games
Gold medal – first place	2022 Hangzhou	Team
Bronze medal – third place	2018 Jakarta	Team
Asia Cup
Gold medal – first place	2017 Dhaka
Champions Trophy
Silver medal – second place	2018 Breda
Asian Champions Trophy
Gold medal – first place	2018 Muscat
Gold medal – first place	2023 Chennai
Bronze medal – third place	2021 Dhaka
Commonwealth Games
Silver medal – second place	2022 Birmingham	Team
World League
Bronze medal – third place	2016–17 Bhubaneswar	Team
Junior World Cup
Gold medal – first place	2016 Lucknow
Junior Asia Cup
Gold medal – first place	2015 Kuantan

Varun Kumar (born 25 July 1995) is an Indian field hockey player who plays as a defender for Punjab Warriors in the Hockey India League and the Indian national team. He was part of the Indian team that won a bronze medal at the 2020 Tokyo Olympics.

== Career ==
Born in Punjab, Kumar belongs to Dalhousie, Chamba district, Himachal Pradesh. Kumar first started to play hockey when he was in school. He represented his home state of Punjab in the Junior National Championships in 2012 and did very well, earning a call-up to the junior national team. Injury soon after the tournament kept Kumar quiet for two years before he played the 2014 Junior National Championships and was recalled into the junior national team.

Kumar soon managed to sign with the Punjab Warriors in the Hockey India League. He was retained for the 2014 season. After the season, he was retained for a period of two years for the 2015 and 2016 seasons of the league. Finally he won gold medal in 2022 Asian Games in Hangzhou.

== International ==
Kumar has represented the India junior side. He emerged as the top-scorer for India during the Four-Nations Invitational Tournament in Spain before being selected into the side for the Junior World Cup side.

=== Awards ===
Himachal Pradesh announced Rs.1 crore award for Kumar, for his Olympic bronze medal at Tokyo Olympics.
