= 2016 Men's Hockey Junior World Cup =

11th edition of the Men's Hockey Junior World Cup

Junior Hockey World Cup (India) 2016

Tournament details
- Host country: India
- City: Lucknow
- Dates: 8–18 December 2016
- Teams: 16 (from 5 confederations)
- Venue: Major Dhyan Chand Stadium

Final positions
- Champions: India (2nd title)
- Runner-up: Belgium
- Third place: Germany

Tournament statistics
- Matches played: 44
- Goals scored: 185 (4.2 per match)
- Top scorer: (England) Edward Horler (8 goals)
- Best player: (Spain) Enrique González de Castéjon
- Best goalkeeper: (Belgium) Loic Van Doren

The 2016 Men's Hockey Junior World Cup was the 11th edition of the Hockey Junior World Cup for men, an international field hockey tournament. It was held in Lucknow, India from 8–18 December 2016. A total of sixteen teams competed for the title.

Host nation India won the tournament for the second time after defeating Belgium 2–1 in the final. Germany won the third-place match by defeating Australia 3–0.

== Qualification ==
Each continental federation got a number of quotas depending on the FIH World Rankings for teams qualified through their junior continental championships. Alongside the host nation, 15 other teams will compete in the tournament. Pakistan officially qualified for the tournament through their position in the Junior Asia Cup but later were replaced by Malaysia due to not meeting the FIH deadline for submitting entries.

Dates	Event	Location	Quotas	Qualifier(s)
Host nation			1	India
20–26 July 2014	2014 EuroHockey Junior Championship	Waterloo, Belgium	6	Netherlands; Germany; England; Belgium; Spain; Austria
14–22 November 2015	2015 Junior Asia Cup	Kuantan, Malaysia	3	Japan; Malaysia; ~~Pakistan~~; South Korea
18–24 January 2016	2016 Oceania Junior Cup	Gold Coast, Australia	2	Australia; New Zealand
18–28 March 2016	2016 Junior Africa Cup for Nations	Windhoek, Namibia	2	Egypt; South Africa
20–29 March 2016	2016 Pan American Junior Championship	Toronto, Canada	2	Argentina; Canada
Total			16	

== Umpires ==
Below are the 14 umpires appointed by the International Hockey Federation:

- Deepak Joshi (India)
- Aziz Adimah (Ghana)
- Dan Barstow (England)
- Tim Bond (New Zealand)
- Sherif Elamari (Egypt)
- Pietro Galligani (Italy)
- Federico Garcia (Uruguay)
- Ben Göntgen (Germany)
- Gabriel Labate (Argentina)
- Sebastien Michielsen (Belgium)
- Zeke Newman (Australia)
- Sean Rapaport (South Africa)
- Suolong You (China)
- David Sweetman (Scotland)

== First round ==
All times are Indian Standard Time (UTC+05:30).

=== Pool A ===
Pos	Team	Pld	W	D	L	GF	GA	GD	Pts	Qualification
1	Australia	3	3	0	0	11	3	+8	9	Quarter-finals
2	Argentina	3	1	1	1	7	4	+3	4	Quarter-finals
3	Austria	3	1	1	1	8	7	+1	4	9th–12th place classification
4	South Korea	3	0	0	3	3	15	−12	0	13th–16th place classification

Source: FIH

9 December 2016
10:00

Argentina	1–1	Austria
Domene 47'	Report	Binder 63'

Umpires:
Aziz Adimah
Pietro Galligani

10 December 2016
12:00

South Korea	2–5	Austria
Park 35', 54'	Report	Hilbert 8'; Rudofsky 21', 62'; Binder 39'; Lindengrun 60'

Umpires:
Sherif Elamari
Sebastien Michielsen

10 December 2016
16:00

Argentina	1–2	Australia
Casella 42'	Report	Bird 31'; Govers 69'

Umpires:
Dan Barstow
David Sweetman

12 December 2016
10:00

Australia	4–2	Austria
Simmonds 4'; Sharp 24'; Govers 45'; Welch 46'	Report	Schippan 8'; Lindengrun 67'

Umpires:
Sean Rapaport
Deepak Joshi

12 December 2016
12:00

South Korea	1–5	Argentina
Park 41'	Report	Ferreiro 2'; Domene 12'; Habif 14'; Keenan 29', 50'

Umpires:
Sebastien Michielsen
Suolong You

13 December 2016
12:00

Australia	5–0	South Korea
Gerrard 25'; Govers 33', 34'; Hendry 61'; Arunasalam 68'	Report

Umpires:
David Sweetman
Pietro Galligani

=== Pool B ===
Pos	Team	Pld	W	D	L	GF	GA	GD	Pts	Qualification
1	Belgium	3	3	0	0	10	2	+8	9	Quarter-finals
2	Netherlands	3	2	0	1	16	5	+11	6	Quarter-finals
3	Malaysia	3	1	0	2	4	10	−6	3	9th–12th place classification
4	Egypt	3	0	0	3	0	13	−13	0	13th–16th place classification

Source: FIH

9 December 2016
12:00

Belgium	4–0	Egypt
Simar 18'; Raes 27' van Linthoudt 46'; Lemaire 60'	Report

Umpires:
Tim Bond
Gabriel Labate

9 December 2016
18:00

Netherlands	7–2	Malaysia
van Dam 19'; Brinkman 25' van Groesen 33', 63'; Pieters 40'; Aarts 44'; Croon 49'	Report	Zaidi 59'; Arshad 65'

Umpires:
Ben Göntgen
Sean Rapaport

11 December 2016
14:00

Belgium	3–2	Netherlands
Verheijen 48'; Van Lierde 56'; Raes 69'	Report	Pieters 38' van Groesen 64'

Umpires:
Ben Göntgen
Gabriel Labate

11 December 2016
16:00

Malaysia	2–0	Egypt
Zulhamizan 13'; Hamirin 61'	Report

Umpires:
Deepak Joshi
Pietro Galligani

12 December 2016
16:00

Netherlands	7–0	Egypt
van Dam 7'; Janssen 9', 54' van Groesen 25'; Brinkman 37' van der Graaf 45'; Schoenaker 58'	Report

Umpires:
Dan Barstow
Tim Bond

12 December 2016
18:00

Malaysia	0–3	Belgium
	Report	Stockbroekx 10'; Van Lierde 33'; Verheijen 55'

Umpires:
Zeke Newman
Federico Garcia

=== Pool C ===
Pos	Team	Pld	W	D	L	GF	GA	GD	Pts	Qualification
1	Germany	3	3	0	0	10	3	+7	9	Quarter-finals
2	Spain	3	1	1	1	8	6	+2	4	Quarter-finals
3	New Zealand	3	1	1	1	5	5	0	4	9th–12th place classification
4	Japan	3	0	0	3	2	11	−9	0	13th–16th place classification

Source: FIH

8 December 2016
11:30

New Zealand	1–0	Japan
Logan 55'	Report

Umpires:
David Sweetman
Suolong You

8 December 2016
13:30

Germany	2–1	Spain
Boeckel 25'; Herzbruch 63'	Report	Bordas I Fabregas 48'

Umpires:
Gabriel Labate
Sean Rapaport

9 December 2016
14:00

Spain	4–1	Japan
Serrahima 8'; Garcia Alcalde 24', 37'; De Abadal 25'	Report	Sugiyama 48'

Umpires:
Deepak Joshi
Federico Garcia

9 December 2016
16:00

New Zealand	1–2	Germany
Lane 4'	Report	Herzbruch 24'; Boeckel 51'

Umpires:
Dan Barstow
Sebastien Michielsen

11 December 2016
12:00

Germany	6–1	Japan
Staib 3'; Boeckel 25', 39'; Prinz 54'; Herzbruch 58'; Windfeder 63'	Report	Ozawa 67'

Umpires:
Aziz Adimah
David Sweetman

11 December 2016
18:00

Spain	3–3	New Zealand
Piera Grau 21'; González de Castéjon 62'; Lara Rosell 69'	Report	Hiha 44'; Keaney 59'; Thomas 66'

Umpires:
Federico Garcia
Sean Rapaport

=== Pool D ===
Pos	Team	Pld	W	D	L	GF	GA	GD	Pts	Qualification
1	India (H)	3	3	0	0	11	4	+7	9	Quarter-finals
2	England	3	2	0	1	13	7	+6	6	Quarter-finals
3	South Africa	3	1	0	2	6	7	−1	3	9th–12th place classification
4	Canada	3	0	0	3	1	13	−12	0	13th–16th place classification

Source: FIH
(H) Hosts

8 December 2016
15:30

England	4–2	South Africa
Horler 5', 9'; Scott 11'; Griffiths 62'	Report	De Sousa 13'; Crowe 56'

Umpires:
Zeke Newman
Sherif Elamari

8 December 2016
18:45

India	4–0	Canada
Mandeep 35'; Harmanpreet 46'; Varun 60'; Ajit 66'	Report

Umpires:
Pietro Galligani
Frederico Garcia

10 December 2016
14:00

South Africa	3–1	Canada
Lion-Cachet 26'; Crowe 41'; Pfaff 55'	Report	Pereira 21'

Umpires:
Tim Bond
Zeke Newman

10 December 2016
18:00

India	5–3	England
Parvinder 24'; Qureshi 35'; Harmanpreet 37'; Simranjeet 45'; Varun 59'	Report	Clee 10'; Calnan 63'; Horler 67'

Umpires:
Ben Göntgen
Suolong You

12 December 2016
18:00

South Africa	1–2	India
Lion-Cachet 28'	Report	Harjeet 11'; Mandeep 55'

Umpires:
Sherif Elamari
Gabriel Labate

13 December 2016
10:00

England	6–0	Canada
Calnan 10', 23'; Horler 15', 20', 46'; Proctor 54'	Report

Umpires:
Aziz Adimah
Ben Göntgen

== Classification round ==
=== Thirteenth to sixteenth place classification ===
Cross-overs
14 December
Egypt	0
Japan	1
14 December
South Korea	2
Canada	1

Thirteenth place
16 December
Japan	2
South Korea	1
Fifteenth place
16 December
Egypt	2
Canada	1

==== Cross-overs ====
14 December 2016
11:15

Egypt	0–1	Japan
	Report	Yamasaki 41'

Umpires:
Zeke Newman
Aziz Adimah

14 December 2016
18:00

South Korea	2–1	Canada
Park J. 21'; Oh 26'	Report	Pereira 28'

Umpires:
Sherif Elamari
Deepak Joshi

==== Fifteenth and sixteenth place ====
17 December 2016
12:30

Egypt	2–1	Canada
Gadelkarim 58'; Elganaini 67'	Report	Chopra 35'

Umpires:
Aziz Adimah
Federico Garcia

==== Thirteenth and fourteenth place ====
17 December 2016
14:30

Japan	2–1	South Korea
Watanabe 55'; Yamasaki 70'	Report	Oh 65'

Umpires:
Deepak Joshi
Zeke Newman

=== Ninth to twelfth place classification ===
Cross-overs
14 December
Austria	2
South Africa	4
14 December
Malaysia	1
New Zealand	3

Ninth place
17 December
South Africa	1
New Zealand	4
Eleventh place
17 December
Austria	2 (1)
Malaysia (s.o)	2 (2)

==== Cross-overs ====
14 December 2016
13:30

Austria	2–4	South Africa
Lindengrun 13'; Thörnblom 60'	Report	De Sousa 21'; Halle 32'; Crowe 56'; Ntuli 68'

Umpires:
Sebastien Michielsen
Tim Bond

14 December 2016
15:45

Malaysia	1–3	New Zealand
Omar 28'	Report	Logan 6'; Capizzi 58'; Lane 60'

Umpires:
Pietro Galligani
Gabriel Labate

==== Eleventh and twelfth place ====
17 December 2016
15:45

Austria	2–2	Malaysia
Binder 26'; Kaltenböck 41'	Report	Zulhamizan 8'; Nik Rosemi 14'
Penalties
Thörnblom (penalty shoot-out missed); Schmidt (penalty shoot-out scored); Rudofsky (penalty shoot-out missed); Hilbert (penalty shoot-out missed); Steyrer (penalty shoot-out missed)	1–2	(penalty shoot-out scored) Nik Rosemi; (penalty shoot-out missed) Arshad; (penalty shoot-out missed) Sumantri; (penalty shoot-out scored) Mustafa

Umpires:
sean Rapaport
Sherif Elamari

==== Ninth and tenth place ====
17 December 2016
18:00

South Africa	1–4	New Zealand
Halle 37'	Report	Wilcox 12', 15'; Read 19'; Thomas 30'

Umpires:
Pietro Galligani
Sebastien Michielsen

== Medal round ==
=== Bracket ===
Quarter-finals
15 December
Belgium (s.o.)	1 (4)
Argentina	1 (1)
15 December
Germany	4
England	2
15 December
Australia	2
Netherlands	1
15 December
India	2
Spain	1

Semi-finals
16 December
Belgium (s.o.)	0 (4)
Germany	0 (3)
16 December
Australia	2 (2)
India (s.o.)	2 (4)

Final
18 December
Belgium	1
India	2
Third place
18 December
Germany	3
Australia	0

=== Quarter-finals ===
15 December 2016
11:15

Belgium	1–1	Argentina
Wegnez 69'	Report	Casella 44'
Penalties
Poncelet (penalty shoot-out scored); De Sloover (penalty shoot-out scored); Wegnez (penalty shoot-out scored); Raes (penalty shoot-out scored)	4–1	(penalty shoot-out missed) Casella; (penalty shoot-out scored) Domene; (penalty shoot-out missed) Keenan

Umpires:
Ben Göntgen
Dan Barstow

15 December 2016
13:30

Germany	4–2	England
Schiffer 22'; Windfeder 31'; Scholten 52'; Herzbruch 70'	Report	Horler 65', 66'

Umpires:
Gabriel Labate
Sebastien Michielsen

15 December 2016
15:45

Australia	2–1	Netherlands
Arunasalam 18'; Welch 58'	Report	Janssen 47'

Umpires:
Federico Garcia
Sean Rapaport

15 December 2016
18:00

India	2–1	Spain
Simranjeet 57'; Harmanpreet 66'	Report	Serrahima 23'

Umpires:
David Sweetman
Suolong You

=== Fifth to eighth place classification ===
Cross-overs
17 December
Argentina	3
England	0
17 December
Netherlands	1
Spain	2

Fifth place
18 December
Argentina	2
Spain	1
Seventh place
18 December
England	2
Netherlands	6

==== Cross-overs ====
17 December 2016
11:15

Argentina	3–0	England
Acosta 40'; Nepote 55'; Casella 61'	Report

Umpires:
Federico Garcia
Zeke Newman

17 December 2016
13:30

Netherlands	1–2	Spain
Croon 64'	Report	Piera Grau 30'; Garcia Alcalde 34'

Umpires:
Gabriel Labate
Tim Bond

==== Seventh and eighth place ====
18 December 2016
11:15

England	2–6	Netherlands
Sorsby 55', 66'	Report	van Dam 21'; Brinkman 41', 68' van Groesen 56', 69' de Vilder 65'

Umpires:
Sebastien Michielsen
Zeke Newman

==== Fifth and sixth place ====
18 December 2016
13:30

Argentina	2–1	Spain
Keenan 51'; Domene 54'	Report	Perellon 67'

Umpires:
Sean Rapaport
Tim Bond

=== First to fourth place classification ===
==== Semi-finals ====
16 December 2016
15:45

Belgium	0–0	Germany
	Report
Penalties
Poncelet (penalty shoot-out scored); De Sloover (penalty shoot-out scored); Wegnez (penalty shoot-out missed); Raes (penalty shoot-out scored); Rubens (penalty shoot-out scored)	4–3	(penalty shoot-out missed) Schmid; (penalty shoot-out scored) Große; (penalty shoot-out scored) Prinz; (penalty shoot-out scored) Staib; (penalty shoot-out missed) Herzbruch

Umpires:
Dan Barstow
David Sweetman

16 December 2016
18:00

Australia	2–2	India
Craig 14'; Sharp 57'	Report	Gurjant 42'; Mandeep 48'
Penalties
Govers (penalty shoot-out scored); Bird (penalty shoot-out missed); Sharp (penalty shoot-out missed); Welch (penalty shoot-out scored)	2–4	(penalty shoot-out scored) Harjeet; (penalty shoot-out scored) Harmanpreet; (penalty shoot-out scored) Sumit; (penalty shoot-out scored) Manpreet

Umpires:
Ben Göntgen
Suolong You

==== Third and fourth place ====
18 December 2016
15:45

Germany	3–0	Australia
Schiffer 11'; Herzbruch 51', 60'	Report

Umpires:
David Sweetman
Federico Garcia

==== Final ====
18 December 2016
18:00

Belgium	1–2	India
Van Bockrijck 70'	Report	Gurjant 8'; Simranjeet 22'

Umpires:
Suolong You
Ben Göntgen

== Awards ==
Top Goalscorer	U19 Player of the Tournament	Player of the Tournament	Goalkeeper of the Tournament
(England) Edward Horler	(Germany) Timm Herzbruch	(Spain) Enrique González de Castéjon	(Belgium) Loic Van Doren

== Statistics ==
=== Final standings ===
As per statistical convention in field hockey, matches decided in extra time are counted as wins and losses, while matches decided by penalty shoot-outs are counted as draws.

Pos	Team	Pld	W	D	L	GF	GA	GD	Pts	Final Standings
1st place, gold medalist(s)	India	6	5	1	0	17	8	+9	16	Gold Medal
2nd place, silver medalist(s)	Belgium	6	3	2	1	12	5	+7	11	Silver Medal
3rd place, bronze medalist(s)	Germany	6	5	1	0	17	5	+12	16	Bronze Medal
4	Australia	6	4	1	1	15	9	+6	13	Fourth place
5	Argentina	6	3	2	1	13	6	+7	11	Eliminated in Quarter-finals
6	Spain	6	2	1	3	12	11	+1	7	Eliminated in Quarter-finals
7	Netherlands	6	3	0	3	24	11	+13	9	Eliminated in Quarter-finals
8	England	6	2	0	4	17	20	−3	6	Eliminated in Quarter-finals
9	New Zealand	5	3	1	1	12	7	+5	10	Eliminated in Pool stage
10	South Africa	5	2	0	3	11	13	−2	6	Eliminated in Pool stage
11	Malaysia	5	1	1	3	7	15	−8	4	Eliminated in Pool stage
12	Austria	5	1	2	2	12	13	−1	5	Eliminated in Pool stage
13	Japan	5	2	0	3	5	12	−7	6	Eliminated in Pool stage
14	South Korea	5	1	0	4	6	18	−12	3	Eliminated in Pool stage
15	Egypt	5	1	0	4	2	15	−13	3	Eliminated in Pool stage
16	Canada	5	0	0	5	3	17	−14	0	Eliminated in Pool stage

Source: FIH

=== Goalscorers ===
There were 185 goals scored in 44 matches, for an average of 4.2 goals per match.

8 goals

- (England) Edward Horler

6 goals

- (Germany) Timm Herzbruch
- (Netherlands) Bram van Groesen

4 goals

- (Australia) Blake Govers
- (Germany) Anton Boeckel
- (Netherlands) Thierry Brinkman
- (South Korea) Park Joo-Han

3 goals

- (Argentina) Maico Casella
- (Argentina) Tomás Domene
- (Argentina) Nicolás Keenan
- (Austria) Oliver Binder
- (Austria) Franz Lindengrun
- (England) Will Calnan
- (India) Mandeep Singh
- (India) Harmanpreet Singh
- (India) Simranjeet Singh
- (Netherlands) Jip Janssen
- (Netherlands) Thijs van Dam
- (South Africa) Ryan Crowe
- (Spain) Lucas García Alcade

2 goals

- (Australia) Kiran Arunasalam
- (Australia) Lachlan Sharp
- (Australia) Jack Welch
- (Austria) Pit Rudofsky
- (Belgium) Henri Raes
- (Belgium) Quentin van Lierde
- (Belgium) Thomas Verheijen
- (Canada) Brandon Pereira
- (England) Tom Sorsby
- (Germany) Jan Schiffer
- (Germany) Lukas Windfeder
- (India) Varun Kumar
- (India) Gurjant Singh
- (Japan) Koji Yamasaki
- (Malaysia) Mohamad Zulhamizan
- (Netherlands) Jorrit Croon
- (Netherlands) Terrance Pieters
- (New Zealand) Sam Lane
- (New Zealand) Oliver Logan
- (New Zealand) Dylan Thomas
- (New Zealand) Mackenzie Wilcox
- (South Africa) Matthew De Sousa
- (South Africa) Courtney Halle
- (South Africa) Kyle Lion-Cachet
- (South Korea) Oh Se-Yong
- (Spain) Llorenc Piera Grau
- (Spain) Marc Serrahima

1 goal

- (Argentina) Nicolás Acosta
- (Argentina) Martín Ferreiro
- (Argentina) Thomas Habif
- (Argentina) Ignacio Nepote
- (Australia) Matthew Bird
- (Australia) Tom Criag
- (Australia) Frazer Gerrard
- (Australia) Max Hendry
- (Australia) Joshua Simmonds
- (Austria) Marcel Hilbert
- (Austria) Peter Kaltenböck
- (Austria) Phillip Schippan
- (Austria) Leon Thörnblom
- (Belgium) Alexis Lemaire
- (Belgium) Philippe Simar
- (Belgium) Gregory Stockbroekx
- (Belgium) Fabrice van Bockrijck
- (Belgium) Alexandre van Linthoudt
- (Belgium) Victor Wegnez
- (Canada) Rohan Chopra
- (Egypt) Ahmed Elganaini
- (Egypt) Mohamed Gadelkarim
- (England) Jack Clee
- (England) Jonty Griffiths
- (England) Christopher Proctor
- (England) Peter Scott
- (Germany) Thies Ole Prinz
- (Germany) Florian Scholten
- (Germany) Constantin Staib
- (India) Ajit Pandey
- (India) Armaan Qureshi
- (India) Harjeet Singh
- (India) Parvinder Singh
- (Japan) Ryo Ozawa
- (Japan) Atsushi Sugiyama
- (Japan) Kota Watanabe
- (Malaysia) Amirol Arshad
- (Malaysia) Khaliq Hamirin
- (Malaysia) Aiman Nik Rosemi
- (Malaysia) Firdaus Omar
- (Malaysia) Muhammad Zaidi
- (Netherlands) Daniel Aarts
- (Netherlands) Morris de Vilder
- (Netherlands) Noud Schoenaker
- (Netherlands) Sebastian van der Graaf
- (New Zealand) Robbie Capizzi
- (New Zealand) Sam Hiha
- (New Zealand) Jonty Keaney
- (New Zealand) Brad Read
- (South Africa) Nqobile Ntuli
- (South Africa) Walter Pfaff
- (Spain) Manuel Bordas Fabregas
- (Spain) Pablo de Abadal
- (Spain) Enrique González de Castéjon
- (Spain) Jan Lara Rosell
- (Spain) Marc Perellon

Source: FIH

== See also ==
- 2016 Women's Hockey Junior World Cup
