= Johannes Große =

German field hockey player

Personal information
- Born: 7 January 1997 (age 29) Berlin, Germany
- Height: 1.79 m (5 ft 10 in)

Sport
- Sport: Field hockey
- Position: Defender / Midfielder
- Club: Club an der Alster
Youth career
- Years: Team
- 2000–2014: Zehlendorfer Wespen
Senior career
Years	Team	Caps	Goals
2014–2015	Zehlendorfer Wespen	-	-
2015–2018	Club an der Alster	-	-
2018–2024	Rot-Weiss Köln	-	-
2024–present	Club an der Alster	-	-
National team
Years	Team	Caps	Goals
2016–2017	Germany U21	21	-
2017–present	Germany	103	(9)
Medal record
Men's field hockey
Representing Germany
Olympic Games
Silver medal – second place	2024 Paris	Team
World Cup
Gold medal – first place	2026 Wavre/Amstelveen
EuroHockey Championships
Gold medal – first place	2025 Mönchengladbach
Silver medal – second place	2021 Amstelveen
Junior World Cup
Bronze medal – third place	2016 Lucknow
EuroHockey Junior Championship
Bronze medal – third place	2017 Valencia
- Updated on 9 March 2024

Johannes Große (born 7 January 1997) is a German field hockey player who plays as a defender or midfielder for Bundesliga club Club an der Alster and the German national team.

== Club career ==
Große grew up in Berlin and started playing hockey at the Zehlendorfer Wespen when he was three years old. When he was eighteen years old he left them for Club an der Alster. After three seasons in Hamburg he went to Rot-Weiss Köln for the 2018–19 season. In March 2024 it was announced he will return to Club an der Alster after the 2023–24 season.

== International career ==
Große made his debut for the senior national team in November 2017 against Great Britain. In November 2018, he was selected in the Germany squad for the 2018 World Cup. He also represented Germany at the 2019 European Championship. On 28 May 2021, he was named in the squads for the 2021 EuroHockey Championship and the 2020 Summer Olympics.
