= Harjeet Singh =

Indian professional field hockey player (born 1996)

Harjeet Singh Tulli
Personal information
- Born: 2 January 1996 (age 30) Kurali, Mohali, Punjab, India

Sport
- Sport: Field hockey
- Position: Midfielder
Senior career
Years	Team	Caps	Goals
–	Uttar Pradesh Wizards	-	-
2015–2017	Delhi Waveriders	-	-
2019–2020	HGC	-	-
National team
Years	Team	Caps	Goals
2013–	India	50	-
Medal record
Representing India
Men's field hockey
Champions Trophy
Silver medal – second place	2016 London
Junior World Cup
Gold medal – first place	2016 Lucknow
Junior Asia Cup
Gold medal – first place	2015 Kuantan
- Updated on 10 August 2019

Harjeet Singh (born 11 February 1996) is an Indian professional field hockey player who plays as a midfielder.

He captained the Indian squad at the 2016 Men's Hockey Junior World Cup that went unbeaten throughout the tournament, eventually winning a gold medal.

== Club career ==
Harjeet played for the Uttar Pradesh Wizards and the Delhi Waveriders in the Hockey India League. In July 2019 he signed for Dutch club HGC in the Hoofdklasse where he played for one season.
