= Marc Boltó =

Spanish field hockey player

Personal information
- Full name: Marc Boltó Gimo
- Born: 21 November 1995 (age 30) Terrassa, Spain
- Height: 1.82 m (6 ft 0 in)

Sport
- Sport: Field hockey
- Position: Forward
- Club: HDM
Youth career
- Team
- –: Atlètic Terrassa
Senior career
Years	Team	Caps	Goals
2012–2021	Atlètic Terrassa	-	-
2021–2024	HGC	-	-
2024–present	HDM	-	-
National team
Years	Team	Caps	Goals
2013–2016	Spain U21	26	-
2017–2022	Spain	95	(17)
Medal record
Men's field hockey
Representing Spain
EuroHockey Championship
Silver medal – second place	2019 Antwerp
- Updated on 13 September 2021

Marc Boltó Gimo (born 21 November 1995) is a Spanish field hockey player who plays as a forward for Dutch Hoofdklasse club HDM. He played 95 times for the Spanish national team from 2017 until 2022.

== Club career ==
Boltó played his whole career for Atlètic Terrassa but he joined Dutch Hoofdklasse club HGC for the 2021–22 season. After the relegation with HGC in the 2023–24 season he moved to HDM.

== International career ==
Boltó made his debut for the senior national team in June 2017 in a test match against Belgium. He represented Spain at the 2018 World Cup. At the 2019 EuroHockey Championship, he won his first medal with the national team as they finished second. On 25 May 2021, he was selected in the squad for the 2021 EuroHockey Championship.
