= Tim Brinkman =

Dutch footballer (born 1997)

Personal information
- Date of birth: 22 March 1997 (age 29)
- Place of birth: Bilthoven, Netherlands
- Height: 1.80 m (5 ft 11 in)
- Position: Left-back

Team information
- Current team: WV-HEDW

Youth career
- 2004–2010: Ajax
- 2010–2016: Utrecht

Senior career*
Years	Team	Apps	(Gls)
2016–2020	Jong Utrecht	77	(0)
2018	Utrecht	0	(0)
2020–2023	Spakenburg	5	(0)
2023	GVVV	7	(0)
2023–2024	Lisse	28	(1)
2024–2025	Ajax Amateurs		
2025–	WV-HEDW		
- * Club domestic league appearances and goals as of 16:45, 7 October 2024 (UTC)

Tim Brinkman (born 22 March 1997) is a Dutch footballer who plays as a left-back for amateur side WV-HEDW.

He is the brother of Thierry Brinkman, who is a Dutch field hockey player, and the son of Jacques Brinkman, a former Dutch field hockey player.

== Club career ==
He made his professional debut in the Eerste Divisie for Jong FC Utrecht on 5 August 2016 in a game against NAC Breda. He joined Lisse in 2023. In s2025, he moved to WV-HEDW.
