= Harendra Singh =

Indian field hockey player and coach

Sport
- Sport: Field hockey
Medal record
Men's field hockey
Representing India
Asian Games
Silver medal – second place	1990 Beijing	Men's team

Harendra Singh (born 15 November 1966, Chhapra, Bihar) is an Indian field hockey coach and former player, who last served as the head coach of the India women's national field hockey team in 2025. He is a former head coach of India's men's, women's and junior teams.

== Education ==
He attended Kirori Mal College & SGTB Khalsa College, Delhi University.

== Playing career ==
Hailing from Chhapra, Bihar, Singh started his career as a halfback playing with IFFCO Tokio in Delhi. In 1988, he joined the Mahindra & Mahindra team in Mumbai on the insistence of former India coach J. M. Carvalho. He switched to Air India in 1990 and later became the company's senior manager. Singh made his international debut at the 1990 Asian Games in Beijing, where India won silver. He represented the Indian hockey team in 43 matches before retiring at the age of 26 citing "too much politics in hockey."

== Coaching career ==
Singh started playing for the French club HC Lyon in 1995 under coach Tony Fernandes who asked Singh to manage the club's junior side "realising his potential as coach". After a few years of coaching in France, he returned to India and worked in various coaching and managerial roles of national senior and junior teams in tournaments such as 2000 Summer Olympics, 2005 Men's Hockey Junior World Cup, 2006 Men's Hockey World Cup, 2006 Asian Games, 2009 Men's Hockey Asia Cup and 2010 Men's Hockey World Cup. He was awarded the Dronacharya Award in 2012.

Singh was appointed head coach of the Indian junior team in 2014, and the team won the 2016 Men's Hockey Junior World Cup. In September 2017, he was appointed as the head coach of the India women's national field hockey team which went on to win the gold medal at the 2017 Women's Hockey Asia Cup.

In May 2018, Singh was named as the head coach of the men's national team, replacing Sjoerd Marijne of the Netherlands who took over the women's team. Singh thus became the first Indian to be appointed full time as the men's team head coach since 2008. Prior to this, he had three stints with the team as interim head coach. The team won silver at the 2018 Men's Hockey Champions Trophy, his first assignment in the role, losing the final to Australia in penalties. Singh was removed as the head coach in January 2019, as the team struggled in other tournaments in 2018. He was reportedly offered the job of head coach of the men's junior team, which he rejected.

In 2021, he was appointed head coach of the United States men's national team.
