= Armaan Qureshi =

Indian field hockey player (born 1995)

Personal information
- Born: 1 January 1995 (age 31) Gwalior, Madhya Pradesh, India

Sport
- Sport: Field hockey
- Position: Forward
National team
Years	Team	Caps	Goals
2014–2016	India U21	11	-
2017–present	India	15	-
Medal record
Men's field hockey
Representing India
Junior World Cup
Gold medal – first place	2016 Lucknow
Junior Asia Cup
Gold medal – first place	2015 Kuantan
- Updated on 29 September 2019

Armaan Qureshi (born 1 January 1995) is an Indian field hockey player who plays as a forward. He was part of the Indian squad that won the 2016 Men's Hockey Junior World Cup.

== Career ==
Qureshi played cricket until the age of 12 after which he took up hockey. Upon the insistence of his father Rahman Qureshi, a meat shop owner in Gwalior, he gave trials for Sports Authority of India hostel in Bhopal in 2008. He was coached by Ashok Dhyan Chand, son of Dhyan Chand, in Bhopal. Qureshi's uncle Hasrat Qureshi also represented India in field hockey in the 1990s.

Qureshi played for Delhi Waveriders in the 2014 and 2015 seasons of the Hockey India League. Ahead of the 2016 season, he was picked by the Punjab Warriors for $4,500, which he has called the turning point of his career.
