= Gurjant Singh =

Indian field hockey player (born 1995)

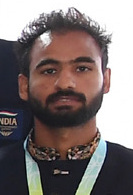
- Singh in August 2022

Personal information
- Born: 26 January 1995 (age 31) Khailara, Amritsar, Punjab, India
- Height: 1.83 m (6 ft 0 in)

Sport
- Sport: Field hockey
- Position: Forward
- Club: ONGC
Senior career
Years	Team	Caps	Goals
–	Dabang Mumbai	-	-
–	ONGC	-	-
National team
Years	Team	Caps	Goals
2015–2016	India U21	11	(7)
2017–26	India	130	(33)
Medal record
Men's field hockey
Representing India
Olympic Games
Bronze medal – third place	2020 Tokyo	Team
Bronze medal – third place	2024 Paris	Team
Asian Games
Gold medal – first place	2022 Hangzhou	Team
Asia Cup
Gold medal – first place	2017 Dhaka
Asian Champions Trophy
Gold medal – first place	2018 Muscat
Gold medal – first place	2023 Chennai
Commonwealth Games
Silver medal – second place	2022 Birmingham	Team
Hockey World League
Bronze medal – third place	2016–17 Bhubaneswar	Team
Junior World Cup
Gold medal – first place	2016 Lucknow
Junior Asia Cup
Gold medal – first place	2015 Kuantan

Gurjant Singh (born 26 January 1995) is a retired Indian field hockey player who played as a Forward.

He was part of the Indian squad which won gold at 2016 Men's Hockey Junior World Cup in Lucknow, India. He was a member of the Indian team that won the gold medal at the 2022 Asian Games in Hangzhou.
