= Mirco Pruyser =

Dutch field hockey player

Personal information
- Born: 11 August 1989 (age 36) Hoofddorp, Netherlands
- Height: 1.94 m (6 ft 4 in)
- Weight: 87 kg (192 lb)

Sport
- Sport: Field hockey
- Position: Forward
Youth career
- Years: Team
- –2004: Reigers
- 2004–2008: Amsterdam
Senior career
Years	Team	Caps	Goals
2008–2023	Amsterdam	-	-
National team
Years	Team	Caps	Goals
2014–2021	Netherlands	142	(80)
Medal record
Men's field hockey
Representing Netherlands
World Cup
Silver medal – second place	2018 Bhubaneswar
EuroHockey Championship
Gold medal – first place	2015 London
Gold medal – first place	2017 Amstelveen
Gold medal – first place	2021 Amstelveen
Bronze medal – third place	2019 Antwerp
Champions Trophy
Bronze medal – third place	2018 Breda

Mirco Pruyser (born 11 August 1989) is a Dutch former field hockey player who played as a forward for Amsterdam and the Dutch national team.

He participated at the 2016 Summer Olympics with the Dutch national team, where they finished fourth.

== Club career ==
Pruyser started playing at MHC De Reigers in Hoofddorp, when he was fifteen years old me moved to Amsterdam, where he made his debut in the first team in 2008. In April 2023, he became the all-time top scorer for Amsterdam in the Hoofdklasse, with 214 goals. After the 2022–23 season he retired from playing top-level hockey.

== International career ==
He made his debut for the Dutch national team in 2014 and won his first medal with the national team at the 2015 European Championships. In June 2019, he was selected in the Netherlands squad for the 2019 EuroHockey Championship. They won the bronze medal by defeating Germany 4–0. He was the joint-topscorer with three other players at the tournament. After the 2020 Summer Olympics he announced his retirement from the national team.

== Honours ==
Amsterdam

- Hoofdklasse: 2010–11, 2011–12
- Gold Cup: 2018–19

Netherlands

- EuroHockey Championship: 2015, 2017, 2019

Individual

- EuroHockey Championship leading goalscorer: 2017, 2019

Records

- Amsterdam top Hoofdklasse goalscorer: 214 goals
