= Constantin Staib =

German field hockey player

Personal information
- Born: 31 August 1995 (age 30) Münster, Germany
- Height: 1.86 m (6 ft 1 in)

Sport
- Sport: Field hockey
- Position: Midfielder / Forward
- Club: Hamburger Polo Club
Youth career
- Team
- –: Zehlendorfer Wespen
Senior career
Years	Team	Caps	Goals
–2018	Club an der Alster	-	-
2018–present	Hamburger Polo Club	-	-
National team
Years	Team	Caps	Goals
2014–2016	Germany U21	22	(6)
2014–present	Germany (indoor)	11	(11)
2015–present	Germany	103	(53)
Medal record
Representing Germany
Men's field hockey
EuroHockey Championship
Silver medal – second place	2015 London
Silver medal – second place	2021 Amstelveen
Champions Trophy
Bronze medal – third place	2016 London
Junior World Cup
Bronze medal – third place	2016 Lucknow
EuroHockey Junior Championship
Silver medal – second place	2014 Waterloo
Men's indoor hockey
EuroHockey Indoor Championship
Gold medal – first place	2014 Vienna
Gold medal – first place	2024 Leuven

Constantin Staib (born 31 August 1995) is a German field hockey player who plays as a midfielder or forward for Hamburger Polo Club and the German national team.

== Club career ==
Constantin Staib plays as a forward for German club Hamburger Polo Club. Prior to his move to Hamburger Polo Club, Staib played for Club an der Alster until 2018.

== International career ==
In 2015, Staib made his international debut for Germany in a test match against South Africa in Cape Town. In the same year, he won his first medal with Germany at the EuroHockey Nations Championship in London, finishing in second place.

Since his debut, Staib has been a regular inclusion in the national team, most notably winning bronze at the 2016 Champions Trophy. Staib's most recent appearance for Germany was during the inaugural FIH Pro League in 2019. On 28 May 2021, he was named in the squad for the 2021 EuroHockey Championship and the 2020 Summer Olympics.
