= Mandeep Singh (field hockey) =

Indian field hockey player

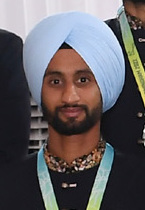
- Singh in 2022

Personal information
- Born: 25 January 1995 (age 31) Jalandhar, Punjab, India
- Height: 178 cm (5 ft 10 in)
- Spouse: Udita Duhan (m. 2025)

Sport
- Sport: Field hockey
- Position: Forward
- Club: Punjab Armed Police
Youth career
- Team
- –: Surjit Hockey Academy
Senior career
Years	Team	Caps	Goals
2013–2014	Ranchi Rhinos	15	12
2015–2017	Delhi Waveriders	-	-
2017–2024	ONGC	-	-
2024–	Punjab Armed Police	-	-
National team
Years	Team	Caps	Goals
2013–2016	India U21	17	(24)
2013–	India	305	(131)
Medal record
Men's field hockey
Representing India
Olympic Games
Bronze medal – third place	2020 Tokyo	Team
Bronze medal – third place	2024 Paris	Team
World League
Bronze medal – third place	2016–17 Bhubaneswar	Team
Champions Trophy
Silver medal – second place	2016 London
Silver medal – second place	2018 Breda
Commonwealth Games
Silver medal – second place	2022 Birmingham	Team
Asian Games
Gold medal – first place	2022 Hangzhou	Team
Gold medal – first place	2026 Aichi-Nagoya	Team
Bronze medal – third place	2018 Jakarta	Team
Asia Cup
Gold medal – first place	2025 Rajgir
Silver medal – second place	2013 Ipoh
Asian Champions Trophy
Gold medal – first place	2018 Muscat
Gold medal – first place	2023 Chennai
Gold medal – first place	2026 Punjab
Junior World Cup
Gold medal – first place	2016 Lucknow
Junior Asia Cup
Gold medal – first place	2015 Kuantan

Mandeep Singh (born 25 January 1995) is an Indian field hockey player who plays as a forward for India men's national field hockey team and the Team Gonasika in the Hockey India League.

== Personal life ==
In March 2025, Singh married Indian field hockey player Udita Duhan.

== Career ==
=== Early career ===
Singh played field hockey as a youth player for Surjit Hockey Academy which is based in his hometown of Jalandhar, Punjab.

=== International ===
After an amazing showing during the 2013 Hockey India League season, Singh then made his debut for the India men's national field hockey team on 18 February 2013 during the second round of the 2012–14 Hockey World League against Fiji in which India routed the opposition to come out as 16–0 winners. Singh then scored his first ever international goal on 20 February 2013 against Oman in which he scored 42 minutes into the game as India ran out 9–1 winners. Finally he won gold medal in 2022 Asian Games in Hangzhou.

== Franchise career ==
=== Ranchi Rhinos ===
On 16 December 2012, Singh was brought in the first ever Hockey India League auction by the franchise Ranchi Rhinos for a winning bid of $13,000. He made his debut for the Rhinos on 16 January 2013 against Punjab Warriors at the Surjit Hockey Stadium in Ranchi's first ever Hockey India League match in their history and he scored the second goal for the team 50 minutes into the game as the Rhino's ran out 2–1 winners. He then scored his second goal of the season in the next match against Mumbai Magicians on 18 January 2013 at the Astroturf Hockey Stadium in Ranchi, Jharkhand when he scored 22 minutes into the game as Ranchi won the match 3–1. Singh then scored his third goal of the season on 23 January 2013 against Delhi Waveriders at the Astroturf Hockey Stadium when he scored 60 minutes into the match; however his goal was not enough as Ranchi lost the match 4–5. He then scored his first double of his career on 26 January 2013 against Uttar Pradesh Wizards at the Dhyan Chand Astroturf Stadium when he scored 58 minutes into the match as well as 67 minutes into the match as he led Ranchi to a 3–1 victory. Singh then won his first man of the match award on 28 January 2013 after he scored the winning goal for Ranchi Rhinos against the Mumbai Magicians at the Astroturf Hockey Stadium when he managed to find the net 49 minutes into the match to give Ranchi a 2–1 victory.

Singh then began the month of February with a goal on 2 February 2013 against Punjab Warriors at the Astroturf Hockey Stadium when he found the net 34 minutes into the game as Ranchi drew the match 1–1. He then scored his final goal of the regular season on 4 February 2013 against the Punjab Warriors at the Surjit Hockey Stadium when he scored 62 minutes into the game as Ranchi Rhinos won 3–2.

Singh then played his first match for Ranchi Rhinos in the Hockey India League play-offs on 9 February 2013 against the Uttar Pradesh Wizards at the Astroturf Hockey Stadium in the semi-finals in which he helped Ranchi Rhinos reach the final of the Hockey India League with two goals he scored 5 minutes into the game and 66 minutes into the game; Ranchi won the match 4–2. Then in the final Singh managed to help Ranchi Rhinos win the league title over the Delhi Waveriders on 10 February 2013 at the Astroturf Hockey Stadium.

After the season ended Singh won the Hockey India League's Ponty Chadha Trophy for the Upcoming Player of the Tournament award after scoring ten goals in thirteen matches and being the second top scorer throughout the tournament.

=== Team Gonasika ===
In 2024, during the 2024–25 Hockey India League auctions, Team Gonasika bought him for ₹25 lakhs.

== Statistics ==
As of 23 February 2013

=== Domestic ===
Club	Season	League	
Club	Season	Apps	Goals
Ranchi Rhinos	2013	15	12
Career total		13	10

== Honours ==
=== Domestic ===
==== Ranchi Rhinos ====
- Hockey India League: 2013

=== Individual ===
- Ponty Chadha Trophy for the Upcoming Player of the Tournament (2013)
- Best Junior Player of the 2012–14 Men's FIH Hockey World League Final(2014)
