= Arjan Drayton Chana =

English field hockey player (born 1994)

Personal information
- Full name: Arjan Drayton Chana
- Born: 2 March 1994 (age 32) Edgbaston, Birmingham, England

Sport
- Sport: Field hockey
- Position: Forward
- Club: Surbiton
Senior career
Years	Team	Caps	Goals
?–2016	Cannock	-	-
2016–present	Surbiton	-	-
National team
Years	Team	Caps	Goals
2013–2014	England & GB U-21	16	(4)
- Updated on 5 May 2021

Arjan Drayton Chana (born 2 March 1994) is a former English U-21 international field hockey player, who played as a forward for England and Great Britain U-21's.

He plays club hockey in the Men's England Hockey League Premier Division for Surbiton.

Drayton Chana previously played for Cannock.

He was educated at Repton School and has represented England at U-16, U-18 and U-21 levels. He made his GB U-21 debut v Australia, in Sydney in January 2013.
