= Lukas Windfeder =

German field hockey player

Personal information
- Born: 11 May 1995 (age 31) Mülheim, Germany
- Height: 1.84 m (6 ft 0 in)

Sport
- Sport: Field hockey
- Position: Defender
- Club: Uhlenhorst Mülheim
National team
Years	Team	Caps	Goals
2014–2025	Germany	178	(95)
Medal record
Men's field hockey
Representing Germany
Olympic Games
Silver medal – second place	2024 Paris	Team
FIH Hockey World Cup
Gold medal – first place	2023 Bhubaneswar–Rourkela
EuroHockey Championship
Gold medal – first place	2025 Mönchengladbach
Silver medal – second place	2015 London
Silver medal – second place	2021 Amstelveen
Champions Trophy
Gold medal – first place	2014 Bhubaneswar
Bronze medal – third place	2016 London
Junior World Cup
Gold medal – first place	2013 New Delhi
Bronze medal – third place	2016 Lucknow
EuroHockey Junior Championship
Silver medal – second place	2014 Waterloo
Bronze medal – third place	2012 's-Hertogenbosch

Lukas Windfeder (born 11 May 1995) is a German field hockey player who plays as a defender for Bundesliga Uhlenhorst Mülheim. He played a total of 178 matches for the Germany national team from 2014 to 2025 and scored 95 goals.

== Personal life ==
Windfeder was born in Mülheim, Germany and plays his club hockey for HTC Uhlenhorst Mülheim. He also has a sister, Katharina, who has represented the German women's national indoor team.

== Career ==
=== Junior national team ===
Windfeder has represented the junior national team on multiple occasions, accumulating 23 caps for the team, and also winning two Junior World Cup medals.

=== Senior national team ===
Windfeder debuted for the senior national team in 2014, in a test series against South Africa. Since his debut, he has been a regular inclusion in the German team. In 2018, he was named in the German team for the Hockey World Cup in Bhubaneswar, India. On 28 May 2021, he was named in the squad for the 2021 EuroHockey Championship and the 2020 Summer Olympics. He scored two goals in the tournament as they won the silver medal after they lost the final to the Netherlands after a shoot-out. After winning the 2025 Men's EuroHockey Championship, he retired from the national team.
