= Enrique González (field hockey) =

Spanish field hockey player

Personal information
- Full name: Enrique Mateo González de Castejón Velilla
- Born: 26 April 1996 (age 30) Madrid, Spain
- Height: 1.77 m (5 ft 10 in)

Sport
- Sport: Field hockey
- Position: Forward
- Club: Club de Campo
Senior career
Years	Team	Caps	Goals
–	Club de Campo	-	-
National team
Years	Team	Caps	Goals
2013–2016	Spain U21	21	-
2014–present	Spain	119	(17)
Medal record
Men's field hockey
Representing Spain
EuroHockey Championship
Silver medal – second place	2019 Antwerp
Men's hockey5s
Youth Olympic Games
Bronze medal – third place	2014 Nanjing	Team
- Updated on 24 July 2021

Enrique Mateo González de Castejón Velilla (born 26 April 1996) is a Spanish field hockey player who plays as a forward for Club de Campo and the Spanish national team.

== International career ==
=== Junior national teams ===
González was a part of the Spain squad which won the bronze medal at the 2014 Youth Olympic Games in Nanjing, China. He played in two Junior World Cups. He was named the best player of the 2016 Junior World Cup.

=== Senior national team ===
González made his debut for the senior national team in November 2014 in a test match against Great Britain. He represented Spain at the 2018 World Cup. At the 2019 EuroHockey Championship, he won his first medal with the senior team as they finished second. On 25 May 2021, he was selected in the squad for the 2021 EuroHockey Championship.
