= David Goodfield =

English field hockey player

Personal information
- Born: 15 June 1993 (age 33) Shrewsbury, England
- Height: 1.77 m (5 ft 10 in)
- Weight: 76 kg (168 lb)

Sport
- Sport: Field hockey
- Position: Midfielder or forward
Senior career
Years	Team	Caps	Goals
2008–2009	Telford & Wrekin HC	-	-
2011–2015	Sheffield Hallam	-	-
2015–2016	Harvestehuder THC	-	-
2016–2026	Surbiton	-	-
National team
Years	Team	Caps	Goals
2013–2014	England & GB U21	25	-
2017–present	England and GB	62	(12)
Medal record
Men's field hockey
Representing England
Commonwealth Games
Bronze medal – third place	2018 Gold Coast	Team
Bronze medal – third place	2022 Birmingham	Team
EuroHockey Championship
Silver medal – second place	2023 Mönchengladbach
Bronze medal – third place	2017 Amsterdam

David Rhys Goodfield (born 15 June 1993) is an English field hockey player who plays as a midfielder or forward for Surbiton and the England and Great Britain national teams. He competed at the 2024 Summer Olympics.

== Biography ==
Goodfield played hockey for Telford & Wrekin HC, Sheffield Hallam and then Harvestehuder THC before joining Surbiton in the Men's England Hockey League in 2016. While at Surbiton he represented England and won a bronze medal at the 2018 Commonwealth Games in Gold Coast. and won another bronze medal with England in the Men's tournament at the 2022 Commonwealth Games in Birmingham. He then won a silver medal with England at the 2023 Men's EuroHockey Championship in Mönchengladbach.

He was selected to represent Great Britain at the 2024 Summer Olympics. The team went out in the quarter-finals after losing a penalty shootout to India.

Goodfield captained and was part of the Surbiton team that won the league title during the 2024–25 Men's England Hockey League season.
