= Tom Grambusch =

German field hockey player

Personal information
- Full name: Tom Axel Grambusch
- Born: 4 August 1995 (age 31) Mönchengladbach, Germany

Sport
- Sport: Field hockey
- Position: Defender
- Club: Rot-Weiss Köln
Senior career
Years	Team	Caps	Goals
–2013	Gladbach	-	-
2013–	Rot-Weiss Köln	-	-
National team
Years	Team	Caps	Goals
2014–2015	Germany U21	56	(47)
2016–	Germany	130	(69)
Medal record
Men's field hockey
Representing Germany
Olympic Games
Silver medal – second place	2024 Paris	Team
Bronze medal – third place	2016 Rio de Janeiro	Team
World Cup
Gold medal – first place	2023 Bhubaneswar/Rourkela
Gold medal – first place	2026 Wavre/Amstelveen
EuroHockey Championships
Gold medal – first place	2025 Mönchengladbach
Champions Trophy
Bronze medal – third place	2016 London
EuroHockey Junior Championship
Silver medal – second place	2014 Waterloo
- Updated on 12:20, 24 June 2025 (UTC)

Tom Axel Grambusch (born 4 August 1995) is a German field hockey player who plays as a defender for Rot-Weiss Köln and the Germany national team.

He represented his country at the 2016 Summer Olympics, where he won the bronze medal.

He was educated at Seaford College.
