= Thierry Brinkman =

Dutch field hockey player

Personal information
- Born: 19 March 1995 (age 31) Bilthoven, Netherlands
- Height: 1.76 m (5 ft 9 in)

Sport
- Sport: Field hockey
- Position: Midfielder / Forward
- Club: Den Bosch; Kalinga Lancers
Youth career
- Years: Team
- –2010: SCHC
- 2010–2012: Kampong
Senior career
Years	Team	Caps	Goals
2012–2015	Kampong	-	-
2015–2024	Bloemendaal	-	-
2024–present	Den Bosch	-	-
2024–present	Kalinga Lancers	-	-
National team
Years	Team	Caps	Goals
2013–2016	Netherlands U21	20	(15)
2015–present	Netherlands	173	(74)
Medal record
Men's field hockey
Representing the Netherlands
Olympic Games
Gold medal – first place	2024 Paris	Team
World Cup
Silver medal – second place	2018 Bhubaneswar
Bronze medal – third place	2023 Bhubaneswar–Rourkela
EuroHockey Championship
Gold medal – first place	2015 London
Gold medal – first place	2017 Amstelveen
Gold medal – first place	2021 Amstelveen
Gold medal – first place	2023 Mönchengladbach
Silver medal – second place	2025 Mönchengladbach
Bronze medal – third place	2019 Antwerp
Champions Trophy
Bronze medal – third place	2018 Breda
Junior World Cup
Bronze medal – third place	2013 New Delhi
EuroHockey Junior Championship
Gold medal – first place	2014 Waterloo

Thierry Brinkman (born 19 March 1995) is a Dutch field hockey player who plays as a forward or midfielder for Hoofdklasse club Den Bosch and captains the Dutch national team. He is the son of former Dutch international Jacques Brinkman and the brother of Tim Brinkman, a Dutch footballer.

== Club career ==
Thierry started playing hockey at his local club SCHC, whom he left in 2010, to play in the youth ranks of SV Kampong. He made his debut for the first team aged seventeen in the 2012–13 season. In 2015 he transferred to Bloemendaal. With Bloemendaal, he won the 2017–18 Euro Hockey League. In his fourth season with Bloemendaal, he won his first Dutch national title by defeating his former club Kampong in the final. After nine years at Bloemendaal, he moved to Den Bosch where he signed a contract until 2028.

== International career ==
=== Junior national team ===
Brinkman played for the junior national team at the 2013 Junior World Cup in New Delhi, India. At the tournament he scored six goals, helping the Netherlands to a bronze medal. Brinkman again represented the Netherlands at the Junior World Cup in Lucknow, India, where the team finished 7th.

=== Senior national team ===
Brinkman debuted for the senior national team in 2015, in a test match against South Africa, in Cape Town. Brinkman represented the Netherlands at the 2018 Men's Hockey Champions Trophy in Breda, Netherlands, where the team won a bronze medal. In October 2018, he was named in the Dutch squad for the 2018 World Cup, which meant he was about to make his World Cup debut. He played in all seven matches and scored four goals, they eventually los in the final to Belgium. In June 2019, he was selected in the Netherlands squad for the 2019 EuroHockey Championship. They won the bronze medal by defeating Germany 4–0. On 19 June 2024, he was selected to represent the Netherlands at the 2024 Summer Olympics.

== Honours ==
=== Club ===
Bloemendaal

- Euro Hockey League: 2017–18, 2021, 2022, 2022–23
- Hoofdklasse: 2018–19, 2020–21, 2021–22

=== International ===
Netherlands U21

- EuroHockey Junior Championship: 2014

Netherlands

- EuroHockey Championship: 2015, 2017, 2021, 2023
- FIH Pro League: 2021–22, 2022–23
