= Timm Herzbruch =

German field hockey player

Personal information
- Full name: Timm Alexander Herzbruch
- Born: 7 June 1997 (age 29) Essen, Germany
- Height: 1.80 m (5 ft 11 in)
- Weight: 76 kg (168 lb)

Sport
- Sport: Field hockey
- Position: Midfielder / Forward
- Club: Uhlenhorst Mülheim
National team
Years	Team	Caps	Goals
2016–present	Germany	84	(41)
Medal record
Representing Germany
Men's field hockey
Olympic Games
Bronze medal – third place	2016 Rio de Janeiro	Team
EuroHockey Championship
Silver medal – second place	2021 Amstelveen
Champions Trophy
Bronze medal – third place	2016 London
Junior World Cup
Bronze medal – third place	2016 Lucknow
EuroHockey Junior Championship
Silver medal – second place	2014 Waterloo
Men's indoor hockey
Indoor World Cup
Bronze medal – third place	2015 Leipzig
EuroHockey Indoor Championship
Gold medal – first place	2016 Prague
- Updated on 24 July 2021

Timm Alexander Herzbruch (born 7 June 1997) is a German field hockey player who plays as a midfielder or forward for Uhlenhorst Mülheim and the Germany national team.

== International career ==
He represented his country at the 2016 Summer Olympics, where he won the bronze medal. In 2018, Herzbruch was nominated for the FIH Rising Star of the Year Award. On 28 May 2021, he was named in the squads for the 2021 EuroHockey Championship and the 2020 Summer Olympics.
