= Nicolas De Kerpel =

Belgian field hockey player (born 1993)

Personal information
- Born: 23 March 1993 (age 33) Wilrijk, Belgium
- Height: 1.88 m (6 ft 2 in)
- Weight: 80 kg (176 lb)

Sport
- Sport: Field hockey
- Position: Defender
- Club: Herakles
National team
Years	Team	Caps	Goals
2017–present	Belgium	146	(48)
Medal record
Men's field hockey
Representing Belgium
Olympic Games
Gold medal – first place	2020 Tokyo	Team
World Cup
Gold medal – first place	2018 Bhubaneswar
Silver medal – second place	2023 Bhubaneswar–Rourkela
EuroHockey Championship
Gold medal – first place	2019 Antwerp
Bronze medal – third place	2021 Amstelveen
Bronze medal – third place	2023 Mönchengladbach
Youth Olympic Games
Bronze medal – third place	2010 Singapore	Team

Nicolas De Kerpel (born 23 March 1993) is a Belgian professional field hockey player who plays as a utility player for Royal Herakles HC and the Belgian national team. He can play as a defender, midfielder or forward.

== International career ==
De Kerpel represented Belgium at the 2018 Men's Hockey World Cup. He was a part of the Belgian squad which won Belgium its first European title in 2019. On 25 May 2021, he was selected in the squad for the 2021 EuroHockey Championship.
