= Jonty Griffiths =

English field hockey player

Personal information
- Born: 10 January 1995 (age 31)

Sport
- Sport: Field hockey
- Position: Defender or midfielder
- Club: Surbiton
Senior career
Years	Team	Caps	Goals
?-?	Purley Walcountians HC	-	-
?-?	Oxted	-	-
2010-2013	Holcombe	-	-
2013-2017	Loughborough Students	-	-
2017–2019	Wimbledon	-	-
2019–present	Surbiton	-	-
National team
Years	Team	Caps	Goals
2013–2016	England & GB U-21	30	(2)
2017-2018	England & GB	15	(0)
- Updated on 5 May 2021

Jonathan Nicholas Emerson Griffiths (born 10 January 1995) is an English international field hockey player who plays as a defender or midfielder for England and Great Britain.

== Biography ==
Griffiths was educated at Whitgift School and has previous played club hockey in the Men's England Hockey League for Purley Walcountians, Oxted, Holcombe and Loughborough Students. He currently plays his club hockey for Loughborough Students in the National Premier League. He taught at City of London Freemen's School and now at Whitgift School.

He played for England U-16, U-18 and U-21 levels. He was a regular player for England & GB U21s and was part of the team which won the Sultan of Johor Cup in October 2015. He also represented England U21s in the Junior World Cup in 2013 and won an U21 European Championships bronze medal in 2014.

Griffiths joined Surbiton from Wimbledon for the 2019/20 season.
