= 2017 Men's EuroHockey Championship =

2017 Men's EuroHockey Nations Championship
Tournament details
- Host country: Netherlands
- City: Amstelveen
- Dates: 19–27 August
- Teams: 8 (from 1 confederation)
- Venue(s): Wagener Stadium

Final positions
- Champions: Netherlands (5th title)
- Runner-up: Belgium
- Third place: England

Tournament statistics
- Matches played: 20
- Goals scored: 96 (4.8 per match)
- Top scorer(s): (Netherlands) Mirco Pruyser (6 goals)
- Best player: (Belgium) Arthur Van Doren

The 2017 Men's EuroHockey Nations Championship was the 16th edition of the Men's EuroHockey Nations Championship, the biennial international men's field hockey championship of Europe organised by the EHF. It was held from 19 to 27 August 2017 in the Wagener Stadium in Amstelveen, Netherlands. The tournament also served as a qualifier for the 2018 Men's Hockey World Cup, with the winner qualifying.

The hosts and defending champions the Netherlands won their fifth overall title by defeating Belgium 4–2 in the final, while England captured third place by beating Germany 4–2.

== Qualified teams ==
The following teams, shown with pre-tournament world rankings, participated in the 2017 EuroHockey Championship.

Dates	Event	Location	Quotas	Qualifier(s)
31 August 2015	Host		1	Netherlands (4)
21 - 29 August 2015	2015 EuroHockey Championship	London, England	5	Belgium (5); England (7); Germany (3); Ireland (9); Spain (10)
19 - 27 July 2015	2015 EuroHockey Championship II	Prague, Czech Republic	2	Austria (22); Poland (20)
Total			8	

== Format ==
The eight teams were split into two groups of four teams. The top two teams advanced to the semi-finals to determine the winner in a knockout system. The bottom two teams played in a new group with the teams they did not play against in the group stage. The last two teams were relegated to the Men's EuroHockey Championship II.

== Results ==
All times are local (UTC+2).

=== Preliminary round ===
==== Pool A ====
Pos	Team	Pld	W	D	L	GF	GA	GD	Pts	Qualification
1	Netherlands (H)	3	2	0	1	13	6	+7	6	Semi-finals
2	Belgium	3	2	0	1	9	3	+6	6	Semi-finals
3	Spain	3	1	1	1	5	9	−4	4	Pool C
4	Austria	3	0	1	2	3	12	−9	1	Pool C

Source: EuroHockey
Rules for classification: 1) points; 2) goal difference; 3) goals scored; 4) head-to-head result.
(H) Hosts

19 August 2017
17:00

Belgium	4–1	Austria
Dockier 5'; Luypaert 10', 30'; Briels 27'	Report	Bele 7'

Umpires:
Ben Göntgen (GER)
Łukasz Zweirzchowski (POL)

19 August 2017
20:00

Netherlands	7–1	Spain
Van Ass 26'; Verga 27', 47'; Van der Weerden 30'; Pruyser 31'; De Voogd 52', 55'	Report	Arana 38'

Umpires:
Adam Kearns (AUS)
Martin Madden (SCO)

21 August 2017
12:30

Spain	2–2	Austria
Iglesias 47'; Romeu 51'	Report	Körper 35', 60'

Umpires:
Ben Göntgen (GER)
Jakub Mejzlik (CZE)

21 August 2017
20:00

Belgium	5–0	Netherlands
Dockier 5', 25'; Briels 25'; Luypaert 39'; Boon 56'	Report

Umpires:
Adam Kearns (AUS)
Bruce Bale (ENG)

23 August 2017
17:00

Spain	2–0	Belgium
Lleonart 42'; Tarres 51'	Report

Umpires:
Bruce Bale (ENG)
Ben Göntgen (GER)

23 August 2017
20:00

Netherlands	6–0	Austria
Kellerman 1'; Pruyser 6'; Brinkman 23'; Van Ass 40'; Bakker 52'; Van der Weerden 57'	Report

Umpires:
Jakub Mejzlik (CZE}
Łukasz Zweirzchowski (POL)

==== Pool B ====
Pos	Team	Pld	W	D	L	GF	GA	GD	Pts	Qualification
1	Germany	3	2	1	0	12	7	+5	7	Semi-finals
2	England	3	2	0	1	11	5	+6	6	Semi-finals
3	Ireland	3	1	1	1	9	4	+5	4	Pool C
4	Poland	3	0	0	3	4	20	−16	0	Pool C

Source: EuroHockey
Rules for classification: 1) points; 2) goal difference; 3) goals scored; 4) head-to-head result.

20 August 2017
09:00

England	6–0	Poland
Gleghorne 6', 20'; Griffiths 26'; Ward 29', 58'; Condon 41'	Report

Umpires:
Sebastien Michielsen (BEL)
Francisco Vazquez (ESP)

20 August 2017
15:30

Germany	1–1	Ireland
Windfeder 17'	Report	Murray 47'

Umpires:
Jonas van 't Hek (NED)
Jakub Mejzlik (CZE)

21 August 2017
14:45

Ireland	7–1	Poland
Murray 6'; Glassey 10'; O'Donoghue 23', 36'; Sothern 24'; Nelson 55'; Loughrey 59'	Report	Pawlak 39'

Umpires:
Michael Eilmer (AUT)
Sebastien Michielsen (BEL)

21 August 2017
17:00

England	3–4	Germany
Gleghorne 16'; Roper 40'; Dixon 41'	Report	Grambusch 2'; Wellen 11'; Windfeder 45+'; Boeckel 46'

Umpires:
Francisco Vázquez (ESP)
Jonas van 't Hek (NED)

23 August 2017
12:30

Germany	7–3	Poland
Windfeder 12'; Miltkau 13', 59'; Wellen 21', 31'; Linnekogel 39'; Hauke 48'	Report	Gumny 24'; Janiszewski 29'; Poltaszewski 50'

Umpires:
Jonas van 't Hek (NED)
Michael Eilmer (AUT)

23 August 2017
14:45

Ireland	1–2	England
Nelson 13'	Report	Goodfield 32'; Ward 44'

Umpires:
Francisco Vázquez (ESP)
Adam Kearns (AUS)

=== Fifth to eighth place classification ===
==== Pool C ====
The points obtained in the preliminary round against the other team are taken over.

Pos	Team	Pld	W	D	L	GF	GA	GD	Pts	Relegation
5	Spain	3	2	1	0	5	3	+2	7	
6	Ireland	3	1	1	1	9	4	+5	4	
7	Austria (R)	3	0	3	0	5	5	0	3	EuroHockey Championship II
8	Poland (R)	3	0	1	2	3	10	−7	1	EuroHockey Championship II

Source: EuroHockey
Rules for classification: 1) points; 2) goal difference; 3) goals scored; 4) head-to-head result.
(R) Relegated

25 August 2017
12:30

Austria	1–1	Poland
Körper 30'	Report	Krokosz 44'

Umpires:
Martin Madden (SCO)
Sebastien Michielsen (BEL)

25 August 2017
14:45

Spain	1–0	Ireland
González 3'	Report

Umpires:
Adam Kearns (AUS)
Michael Eilmer (AUT)

27 August 2017
09:00

Spain	2–1	Poland
Iglesias 16'; Romeu 45'	Report	Bratkowski 57'

Umpires:
Sebastien Michielsen (BEL)
Michael Eilmer (AUT)

27 August 2017
11:00

Ireland	2–2	Austria
Sothern 27'; O'Donoghue 35'	Report	Körper 5', 57'

Umpires:
Jakub Mejzlik (CZE)
Bruce Bale (ENG)

=== First to fourth place classification ===
Semi-finals
25 August
Netherlands	3
England	1
25 August
Germany	2 (0)
Belgium (p.s.o)	2 (2)

Final
27 August
Netherlands	4
Belgium	2
Third place
27 August
England	4
Germany	2

==== Semi-finals ====
25 August 2017
17:00

Germany	2–2	Belgium
Windfeder 3'; Fürk 59'	Report	Boon 18'; Dockier 37'
Penalties
Hauke (penalty shoot-out missed); Rühr (penalty shoot-out missed); Miltkau (penalty shoot-out missed); Linnekogel (penalty shoot-out missed)	0–2	(penalty shoot-out missed) Gougnard; (penalty shoot-out scored) Denayer; (penalty shoot-out scored) Wegnez; (penalty shoot-out missed) Van Doren

Umpires:
Jonas van 't Hek (NED)
Bruce Bale (ENG)

25 August 2017
20:00

Netherlands	3–1	England
Van der Weerden 21'; Pruyser 22', 39'	Report	Gleghorne 42'

Umpires:
Ben Göntgen (GER)
Jakub Mejzlik (CZE)

==== Third place game ====
27 August 2017
13:30

Germany	2–4	England
Grambusch 16'; Windfeder 44'	Report	Middleton 24'; Sloan 27'; Gleghorne 51'; Roper 59'

Umpires:
Martin Madden (SCO)
Łukasz Zweirzchowski (POL)

==== Final ====
27 August 2017
16:00

Belgium	2–4	Netherlands
Boon 8'; Charlier 28'	Report	Kemperman 37'; Pruyser 45', 60'; Van der Weerden 51'

Umpires:
Adam Kearns (AUS)
Francisco Vázquez (ESP)

== Statistics ==
=== Final standings ===
Rank	Team
Gold medal	Netherlands
Silver medal	Belgium
Bronze medal	England
4	Germany
5	Spain
6	Ireland
7	Austria
8	Poland

Qualification for the 2018 World Cup

Relegation to the EuroHockey Championship II

=== Awards ===
Top Goalscorer	Player of the Tournament	Goalkeeper of the Tournament	Young Player of the Tournament
(Netherlands) Mirco Pruyser	(Belgium) Arthur Van Doren	(Belgium) Vincent Vanasch	(Netherlands) Jorrit Croon

=== Goalscorers ===
There were 96 goals scored in 20 matches, for an average of 4.8 goals per match.

6 goals

- (Netherlands) Mirco Pruyser

5 goals

- (Austria) Michael Körper
- (England) Mark Gleghorne
- (Germany) Lukas Windfeder

4 goals

- (Belgium) Sébastien Dockier
- (Netherlands) Mink van der Weerden

3 goals

- (Belgium) Tom Boon
- (Belgium) Loïck Luypaert
- (England) Samuel Ward
- (Germany) Niklas Wellen
- (Ireland) Shane O'Donoghue

2 goals

- (Belgium) Thomas Briels
- (Belgium) Cédric Charlier
- (England) Phil Roper
- (Germany) Mats Grambusch
- (Germany) Marco Miltkau
- (Ireland) Sean Murray
- (Ireland) Matthew Nelson
- (Ireland) Alan Sothern
- (Netherlands) Seve van Ass
- (Netherlands) Valentin Verga
- (Netherlands) Bob de Voogd
- (Spain) Álvaro Iglesias
- (Spain) Josep Romeu

1 goal

- (Austria) Alexander Bele
- (England) David Condon
- (England) Adam Dixon
- (England) David Goodfield
- (England) Chris Griffiths
- (England) Barry Middleton
- (England) Ian Sloan
- (Germany) Anton Boeckel
- (Germany) Benedikt Fürk
- (Germany) Tobias Hauke
- (Germany) Dieter Linnekogel
- (Ireland) Neal Glassey
- (Ireland) Stuart Loughrey
- (Netherlands) Billy Bakker
- (Netherlands) Thierry Brinkman
- (Netherlands) Bjorn Kellerman
- (Netherlands) Robbert Kemperman
- (Poland) Pawel Bratkowski
- (Poland) Mikołaj Gumny
- (Poland) Maciej Janiszewski
- (Poland) Adrian Krokosz
- (Poland) Patryk Pawlak
- (Poland) Mateusz Poltaszewski
- (Spain) Diego Arana
- (Spain) Enrique González
- (Spain) Xavi Lleonart
- (Spain) Joan Tarres

Source: FIH

== See also ==
- 2017 Men's EuroHockey Championship II
- 2017 Men's EuroHockey Junior Championship
- 2017 Women's EuroHockey Nations Championship
