= Ed Horler =

English field hockey player

Personal information
- Born: 22 September 1995 (age 30)

Sport
- Sport: Field hockey
- Position: Forward
Youth career
- Team
- –: Team Bath Buccaneers
Senior career
Years	Team	Caps	Goals
–	Loughborough Students	-	-
2017–2020	Wimbledon	-	-
2020–2021	Racing Club de Bruxelles	-	-
2021–2025	Wimbledon	-	-
National team
Years	Team	Caps	Goals
2015–2017	England & GB U21	23	(10)
2017–present	England & GB	8	(1)
Medal record
Men's field hockey
Representing England
EuroHockey Junior Championship
Bronze medal – third place	2014 Waterloo

Edward Bertie Horler (born 22 September 1995) is an English former field hockey player who played as a forward for England and Great Britain.

== Biography ==
Horler, educated at Millfield, started playing for Team Bath Buccaneers and represented England U-18s and U-21s. He has also played for Loughborough Students. He played club hockey in the Men's England Hockey League Premier Division for Wimbledon from 2017.

He left England in July 2020 to play for Racing Club de Bruxelles in Belgium but returned to Wimbledon for the 2021/22 season and became the club captain.

Horler retired after the 2025 season.
