= Victor Wegnez =

Belgian field hockey player

Personal information
- Full name: Victor Nicky Wegnez
- Born: 25 December 1995 (age 30) Brussels, Belgium

Sport
- Sport: Field hockey
- Position: Midfielder
Senior career
Years	Team	Caps	Goals
2014–2017	Royal Daring	-	-
2017–2018	KHC Dragons	-	-
2018–2024	Royal Racing	-	-
2024–present	Waterloo Ducks	-	-
2024–present	Soorma Hockey Club	-	-
National team
Years	Team	Caps	Goals
2014–2016	Belgium U21	18	(3)
2015–present	Belgium	175	(26)
Medal record
Men's field hockey
Representing Belgium
Olympic Games
Gold medal – first place	2020 Tokyo	Team
World Cup
Gold medal – first place	2018 Bhubaneswar
Silver medal – second place	2023 Bhubaneswar
European Championship
Gold medal – first place	2019 Antwerp
Silver medal – second place	2017 Amstelveen
Bronze medal – third place	2021 Amstelveen
Bronze medal – third place	2023 Mönchengladbach
Junior World Cup
Silver medal – second place	2016 Lucknow

Victor Nicky Wegnez (born 25 December 1995) is a Belgian field hockey player who plays as a midfielder for the national team. His franchise league teams are Waterloo Ducks and Soorma Hockey Club.

== Club career ==
Wegnez played in the youth academy of Royal Daring and he played for their senior squad until 2017 when he transferred to KHC Dragons. After one season with the Dragons, he joined Racing Club de Bruxelles in 2018. In January 2020, he signed a two-year contract extension at Racing. In the 2021–22 season, he won his second Belgian league title, now with Racing. In February 2024 he announced he would leave Racing at the end of the season and he signed a contract until 2027 at Waterloo Ducks.

== International career ==
In 2016, Wegnez reached the final of the 2016 Junior World Cup and he was part of the Belgian selection that qualified for the final at the 2017 European Championship in Amsterdam. In November 2018, he was selected for the 2018 World Cup, which they eventually won by defeating the Netherlands in the final. At the 2019 EuroHockey Championship, where Belgium won its first European title, he was named the player of the tournament. In December 2019, he was nominated for the FIH Player of the Year Award. On 25 May 2021, he was selected in the squad for the 2021 EuroHockey Championship.

== Honours ==
=== Club ===
Dragons

- Belgian Hockey League: 2017–18

Racing

- Belgian Hockey League: 2021–22

=== International ===
Belgium

- Olympic gold medal: 2020
- World Cup: 2018
- EuroHockey Championship: 2019
- FIH Pro League: 2020–21

=== Individual ===
- EuroHockey Championship Player of the Tournament: 2019
- Hockey World League Final Best Junior Player: 2017
