= 2016 Men's Hockey Champions Trophy =

Field hockey tournament

Tournament details
- Host country: United Kingdom
- City: London
- Dates: 10–17 June
- Teams: 6 (from 3 confederations)
- Venue: Lee Valley Hockey and Tennis Centre

Final positions
- Champions: Australia (14th title)
- Runner-up: India
- Third place: Germany

Tournament statistics
- Matches played: 18
- Goals scored: 74 (4.11 per match)
- Top scorer: (Germany) Marco Miltkau (4 goals)
- Best player: (Germany) Tobias Hauke
- Best goalkeeper: (United Kingdom) George Pinner

The 2016 Men's Hockey Champions Trophy was the 36th edition of the Hockey Champions Trophy for men. It was held between 10 and 17 June 2016 in London, United Kingdom.

Australia won the tournament for a record fourteenth time after defeating India 3–1 in the final on a penalty shoot-out after a 0–0 draw.

== Host city change ==
When the FIH unveiled the event hosts for the 2015–2018 cycle, Argentina was chosen to host this tournament for the first time. After the success of the 2012–13 Women's World League Final played in San Miguel de Tucumán, in early 2015 this city was announced as the host for the 2016 edition of the Champions Trophy. However, in March 2016, the FIH had to terminate all contractual agreements with Argentina as the Argentine Hockey Confederation was unable to fulfil their contractual obligations in regards to television rights, sponsorship and the hosting of events. London was announced as the host instead.

== Format ==
After three editions with two different formats, it was decided to go back to the same one used up until the 2010 edition which consisted of a six-team, round robin tournament.

== Qualification ==
A change in the qualification process was decided, similar to the one used up until 2010. Alongside the host nation, the last Olympic, World Cup and World League champions qualify automatically as well as the winner of the 2014 Champions Challenge I. The remaining spot will be nominated by the FIH Executive Board, making a total of 6 competing teams. If teams qualify under more than once criteria, the additional teams will be invited by the FIH Executive Board as well.

- Great Britain (Host nation)
- Germany (Champions of the 2012 Summer Olympics)
- Australia (Champions of the 2014 World Cup and the 2014–15 World League)
- South Korea (Winner of 2014 Champions Challenge I)
- Belgium (Invited by the FIH Executive Board)
- India (Invited by the FIH Executive Board)

== Umpires ==
Below are the nine umpires appointed by the International Hockey Federation:

- Diego Barbas (ARG)
- Chen Dekang (CHN)
- Lim Hong Zhen (SIN)
- Jakub Mejzlík (CZE)
- Raghu Prasad (IND)
- Haider Rasool (PAK)
- Nathan Stagno (GBR)
- David Tomlinson (NZL)
- Coen van Bunge (NED)

== Results ==
All times are local (UTC+1).

=== Pool ===
| Pos | Team | Pld | W | D | L | GF | GA | GD | Pts | Qualification |
|---|---|---|---|---|---|---|---|---|---|---|
| 1 | Australia | 5 | 4 | 1 | 0 | 14 | 7 | +7 | 13 | Final |
| 2 | India | 5 | 2 | 1 | 2 | 10 | 11 | −1 | 7 | Final |
| 3 | Germany | 5 | 1 | 3 | 1 | 18 | 12 | +6 | 6 | Third place game |
| 4 | Great Britain (H) | 5 | 1 | 3 | 1 | 9 | 7 | +2 | 6 | Third place game |
| 5 | Belgium | 5 | 1 | 2 | 2 | 9 | 12 | −3 | 5 | Fifth place game |
| 6 | South Korea | 5 | 1 | 0 | 4 | 6 | 17 | −11 | 3 | Fifth place game |

Source: FIH
Rules for classification: 1) points; 2) goal difference; 3) goals scored; 4) head-to-head result.
(H) Hosts

10 June 2016
16:00

| Germany | 3–3 | India |
|---|---|---|
| Grambusch 26', 36'; Gomoll 57' | Report | Raghunath 7'; Mandeep 26'; Harmanpreet 32' |

Umpires:
Diego Barbas (ARG)
Lim Hong Zhen (SIN)

10 June 2016
18:00

| Belgium | 0–2 | South Korea |
|---|---|---|
| | Report | Yang 26'; Jung 43' |

Umpires:
Nathan Stagno (GBR)
Haider Rasool (PAK)

10 June 2016
20:00

| Great Britain | 0–0 | Australia |
|---|---|---|
| | Report |

Umpires:
Chen Dekang (CHN)
David Tomlinson (NZL)

11 June 2016
14:00

| Germany | 4–4 | Belgium |
|---|---|---|
| Hauke 3'; Miltkau 24', 51'; Korn 54' | Report | Dockier 17'; Van Doren 30'; De Paeuw 39'; Van Aubel 41' |

Umpires:
David Tomlinson (NZL)
Raghu Prasad (IND)

11 June 2016
16:00

| India | 2–1 | Great Britain |
|---|---|---|
| Mandeep 17'; Harmanpreet 34' | Report | Jackson 35' |

Umpires:
Coen van Bunge (NED)
Diego Barbas (ARG)

11 June 2016
18:00

| Australia | 4–2 | South Korea |
|---|---|---|
| Govers 27'; Ockenden 37'; Mitton 51'; Turner 60' | Report | Kim Ju-h. 38'; Kim Jun. 45' |

Umpires:
Lim Hong Zhen (SIN)
Jakub Mejzlík (CZE)

13 June 2016
12:00

| South Korea | 1–4 | Great Britain |
|---|---|---|
| You S. 22' | Report | Jackson 12'; Condon 18', 46'; Brogdon 33' |

Umpires:
Jakub Mejzlík (CZE)
Raghu Prasad (IND)

13 June 2016
14:00

| Germany | 3–4 | Australia |
|---|---|---|
| Fuchs 12', 30'; Hauke 14' | Report | Turner 17'; White 22'; Govers 40'; Zalewski 53' |

Umpires:
Nathan Stagno (GBR)
Coen van Bunge (NED)

13 June 2016
16:00

| Belgium | 2–1 | India |
|---|---|---|
| Hendrickx 25'; Truyens 44' | Report | Devindar 30' |

Umpires:
David Tomlinson (NZL)
Chen Dekang (CHN)

14 June 2016
16:00

| India | 2–1 | South Korea |
|---|---|---|
| Sunil 39'; Chandanda 57' | Report | Kim Ju-h. 57' |

Umpires:
Nathan Stagno (GBR)
Lim Hong Zhen (SIN)

14 June 2016
18:00

| Australia | 2–0 | Belgium |
|---|---|---|
| Turner 38'; White 49' | Report |

Umpires:
Chen Dekang (CHN)
Diego Barbas (ARG)

14 June 2016
20:00

| Great Britain | 1–1 | Germany |
|---|---|---|
| Jackson 48' | Report | Hauke 29' |

Umpires:
Coen van Bunge (NED)
Raghu Prasad (IND)

16 June 2016
16:00

| Australia | 4–2 | India |
|---|---|---|
| Mitton 20'; Zalewski 23'; Ogilvie 35'; White 45' | Report | Raghunath 45'; Mandeep 49' |

Umpires:
Coen van Bunge (NED)
Nathan Stagno (GBR)

16 June 2016
18:00

| South Korea | 0–7 | Germany |
|---|---|---|
| | Report | Staib 12', 60'; Grambusch 27'; Deecke 29', 35'; Herzbruch 32'; Miltkau 58' |

Umpires:
Chen Dekang (CHN)
Jakub Mejzlík (CZE)

16 June 2016
20:00

| Great Britain | 3–3 | Belgium |
|---|---|---|
| Middleton 25', 59'; Ames 57' | Report | Briels 1'; Luypaert 30', 42' |

Umpires:
David Tomlinson (NZL)
Lim Hong Zhen (SIN)

=== Classification ===
==== Fifth and sixth place ====
17 June 2016
15:45

| Belgium | 4–3 | South Korea |
|---|---|---|
| Gougnard 20', 49'; Cosyns 53'; Van Aubel 54' | Report | Seo J. 24'; Yang 34', 35' |

Umpires:
Nathan Stagno (GBR)
Chen Dekang (CHN)

==== Third and fourth place ====
17 June 2016
18:00

| Germany | 1–0 | Great Britain |
|---|---|---|
| Miltkau 40' | Report |

Umpires:
Lim Hong Zhen (SIN)
Jakub Mejzlík (CZE)

==== Final ====
17 June 2016
20:15

| Australia | 0–0 | India |
|---|---|---|
| | Report |
Penalties
| Zalewski (penalty shoot-out scored); Beale (penalty shoot-out scored); Mitton (penalty shoot-out missed); Orchard (penalty shoot-out scored) | 3–1 | (penalty shoot-out missed) Uthappa; (penalty shoot-out missed) Sunil; (penalty shoot-out scored) Harmanpreet; (penalty shoot-out missed) Surender |

Umpires:
Coen van Bunge (NED)
David Tomlinson (NZL)

== Statistics ==
=== Final standings ===
1. Australia
2. India
3. Germany
4. Great Britain
5. Belgium
6. South Korea

=== Awards ===
| Top Goalscorer | Player of the Tournament | Goalkeeper of the Tournament | Young Player of the Tournament |
|---|---|---|---|
| (Germany) Marco Miltkau | (Germany) Tobias Hauke | (United Kingdom) George Pinner | (India) Harmanpreet Singh |

=== Goalscorers ===
There were 74 goals scored in 18 matches, for an average of 4.11 goals per match.

4 goals

- (Germany) Marco Miltkau

3 goals

- (Australia) Glenn Turner
- (Australia) Tristan White
- (Germany) Tom Grambusch
- (Germany) Tobias Hauke
- (United Kingdom) Ashley Jackson
- (India) Mandeep Singh
- (South Korea) Yang Ji-Hun

2 goals

- (Australia) Blake Govers
- (Australia) Trent Mitton
- (Australia) Aran Zalewski
- (Belgium) Florent Van Aubel
- (Belgium) Simon Gougnard
- (Belgium) Loïck Luypaert
- (Germany) Oskar Deecke
- (Germany) Florian Fuchs
- (Germany) Constantin Staib
- (United Kingdom) David Condon
- (United Kingdom) Barry Middleton
- (India) V. R. Raghunath
- (India) Harmanpreet Singh
- (South Korea) Kim Ju-Hun

1 goal

- (Australia) Eddie Ockenden
- (Australia) Flynn Ogilvie
- (Belgium) Thomas Briels
- (Belgium) Tanguy Cosyns
- (Belgium) Sébastien Dockier
- (Belgium) Arthur Van Doren
- (Belgium) Alexander Hendrickx
- (Belgium) Alexandre De Paeuw
- (Belgium) Jérôme Truyens
- (Germany) Jonas Gomoll
- (Germany) Timm Herzbruch
- (Germany) Oliver Korn
- (United Kingdom) David Ames
- (United Kingdom) Alastair Brogdon
- (India) S. V. Sunil
- (India) Chandanda Thimmaiah
- (India) Devindar Walmiki
- (South Korea) Seo Jong-Ho
- (South Korea) Kim Jung-Hoo
- (South Korea) Jung Man-Jae
- (South Korea) You Seung-Ju

Source: FIH

== See also ==
- 2016 Women's Hockey Champions Trophy
