= 2019 Men's EuroHockey Championship =

Hockey championship

Tournament details
- Host country: Belgium
- City: Antwerp
- Dates: 16–24 August
- Teams: 8 (from 1 confederation)
- Venue: Wilrijkse Plein

Final positions
- Champions: Belgium (1st title)
- Runner-up: Spain
- Third place: Netherlands

Tournament statistics
- Matches played: 20
- Goals scored: 103 (5.15 per match)
- Top scorer(s): (Belgium) Tom Boon (Belgium) Alexander Hendrickx (Netherlands) Mirco Pruyser (Spain) Pau Quemada (5 goals)
- Best player: (Belgium) Victor Wegnez

The 2019 Men's EuroHockey Championship was the 17th edition of the EuroHockey Nations Championship, the biennial international men's field hockey championship of Europe organised by the European Hockey Federation.

It was held alongside the women's tournament from 16 to 24 August 2019 in Antwerp, Belgium. The tournament also served as a direct qualifier for the 2020 Tokyo Olympics, with the winner Belgium qualifying.

The hosts Belgium won their first-ever European title after beating Spain 5–0 in the final. The two-time defending champions the Netherlands won the bronze medal by defeating Germany 4–0.

== Qualified teams ==
The following teams, shown with pre-tournament world rankings, participated in the 2019 EuroHockey Championship.

Dates	Event	Location	Quotas	Qualifier(s)
15 June 2016	Host		1	Belgium (2)
19–27 August 2017	2017 EuroHockey Championship	Amstelveen, Netherlands	5	Netherlands (3); England (6); Germany (7); Spain (9); Ireland (11)
6–12 August 2017	2017 EuroHockey Championship II	Glasgow, Scotland	2	Scotland (21); Wales (25)
Total			8	

== Format ==
The eight teams were split into two groups of four teams. The top two teams advanced to the semifinals to determine the winner in a knockout system. The bottom two teams played in a new group with the teams they did not play against in the group stage. The last two teams were relegated to the EuroHockey Championship II.

== Results ==
All times are local (UTC+2).

=== Preliminary round ===
==== Pool A ====
Pos	Team	Pld	W	D	L	GF	GA	GD	Pts	Qualification
1	Belgium (H)	3	3	0	0	13	0	+13	9	Semi-finals
2	Spain	3	1	1	1	7	8	−1	4	Semi-finals
3	England	3	0	2	1	4	6	−2	2	Pool C
4	Wales	3	0	1	2	3	13	−10	1	Pool C

Source: FIH
Rules for classification: 1) points; 2) matches won; 3) goal difference; 4) goals for; 5) head-to-head result; 6) field goals for.
(H) Hosts

16 August 2019
20:30

Belgium	5–0	Spain
Hendrickx 9', 54'; Wegnez 19'; Boon 52'; Kina 55'	Report

Umpires:
Jakub Mejzlík (CZE)
Jonas van't Hek (NED)

17 August 2019
11:15

England	2–2	Wales
Ward 26'; Gall 58'	Report	G. Furlong 32'; R. Furlong 52'

Umpires:
Sébastien Duterme (BEL)
Andrés Ortiz (ESP)

18 August 2019
13:30

Spain	5–1	Wales
Iglesias 3'; Quemada 14', 56'; Ruiz 28'; Romeu 36'	Report	G. Furlong 42'

Umpires:
Paul Walker (ENG)
Sébastien Duterme (BEL)

18 August 2019
18:00

England	0–2	Belgium
	Report	Boon 15'; Hendrickx 49'

Umpires:
Coen van Bunge (NED)
Michael Gholami-Eilmer (AUT)

20 August 2019
13:30

Spain	2–2	England
Quemada 33'; Arana 43'	Report	Ward 21'; Jackson 52'

Umpires:
Ben Göntgen (GER)
Sébastien Duterme (BEL)

20 August 2019
20:30

Belgium	6–0	Wales
Hendrickx 15'; Boon 15'; De Kerpel 25'; Charlier 28', 35'; Briels 41'	Report

Umpires:
Bruce Bale (ENG)
Andrés Ortiz (ESP)

==== Pool B ====
Pos	Team	Pld	W	D	L	GF	GA	GD	Pts	Qualification
1	Netherlands	3	3	0	0	14	3	+11	9	Semi-finals
2	Germany	3	2	0	1	16	3	+13	6	Semi-finals
3	Ireland	3	0	1	2	4	13	−9	1	Pool C
4	Scotland	3	0	1	2	3	18	−15	1	Pool C

Source: FIH
Rules for classification: 1) points; 2) matches won; 3) goal difference; 4) goals for; 5) head-to-head result; 6) field goals for.

17 August 2019
13:30

Germany	9–0	Scotland
Herzbruch 8', 40', 49'; Wellen 9', 34'; M. Grambusch 25'; Fuchs 28'; Rühr 54'; Häner 55'	Report

Umpires:
Michael Gholami-Eilmer (AUT)
Bruce Bale (ENG)

17 August 2019
15:45

Netherlands	5–1	Ireland
Van Ass 3'; Pruyser 5', 52'; Kellerman 8', 37'	Report	O'Donoghue 25'

Umpires:
Paul Walker (ENG)
Ben Göntgen (GER)

18 August 2019
15:45

Ireland	3–3	Scotland
O'Donoghue 12', 58'; Cross 55'	Report	Bain 28', 33'; Falconer 51'

Umpires:
Jonas van't Hek (NED)
Andrés Ortiz (ESP)

18 August 2019
20:30

Germany	2–3	Netherlands
Herzbruch 25'; Windfeder 42'	Report	Pruyser 21'; Bakker 40'; Brinkman 51'

Umpires:
Francisco Vázquez (ESP)
Jakub Mejzlík (CZE)

20 August 2019
15:45

Ireland	0–5	Germany
	Report	Wellen 3'; T. Grambusch 8'; Hellwig 55'; Fuchs 60'; Windfeder 60'

Umpires:
Coen van Bunge (NED)
Francisco Vázquez (ESP)

20 August 2019
18:00

Netherlands	6–0	Scotland
Bakker 6'; Brinkman 15', 37'; Van der Weerden 30'; Janssen 58'; Pruyser 60+'	Report

Umpires:
Michael Gholami-Eilmer (AUT)
Paul Walker (ENG)

=== Fifth to eighth place classification ===
==== Pool C ====
The points obtained in the preliminary round against the other team were taken over.

Pos	Team	Pld	W	D	L	GF	GA	GD	Pts	Relegation
5	England	3	2	1	0	7	3	+4	7	
6	Wales	3	1	1	1	8	6	+2	4	
7	Scotland (R)	3	1	1	1	7	8	−1	4	Relegation to Championship II
8	Ireland (R)	3	0	1	2	4	9	−5	1	Relegation to Championship II

Source: FIH
Rules for classification: 1) points; 2) matches won; 3) goal difference; 4) goals for; 5) head-to-head result; 6) field goals for.
(R) Relegated

22 August 2019
13:30

Wales	2–4	Scotland
Dolan-Gray 40'; Prosser 60'	Report	Golden 2', 53'; Falconer 12'; Parkes 35'

Umpires:
Jakub Mejzlík (CZE)
Paul Walker (ENG)

22 August 2019
15:45

England	2–1	Ireland
Wallace 11'; Roper 12'	Report	Robson 21'

Umpires:
Francisco Vázquez (ESP)
Andrés Ortiz (ESP)

24 August 2019
13:30

England	3–0	Scotland
Ward 15', 29'; Jackson 27'	Report

Umpires:
Jonas van't Hek (NED)
Sébastien Duterme (BEL)

24 August 2019
15:45

Ireland	0–4	Wales
	Report	G. Furlong 4', 20'; Hutchinson 39'; Francis 51'

Umpires:
Coen van Bunge (NED)
Michael Gholami-Eilmer (AUT)

=== First to fourth place classification ===
Semi-finals
22 August
Belgium	4
Germany	2
22 August
Netherlands	3
Spain	4

Final
24 August
Belgium	5
Spain	0
Third place
24 August
Germany	0
Netherlands	4

==== Semi-finals ====
22 August 2019
18:00

Netherlands	3–4	Spain
Bakker 53'; Janssen 59', 60'	Report	Quemada 2', 19'; Romeu 34'; Sánchez 50'

Umpires:
Bruce Bale (ENG)
Ben Göntgen (GER)

22 August 2019
20:30

Belgium	4–2	Germany
Boon 42'; De Kerpel 54'; Wegnez 56'; Charlier 58'	Report	Rühr 21'; Fuchs 26'

Umpires:
Jonas van't Hek (NED)
Coen van Bunge (NED)

==== Third and fourth place ====
24 August 2019
18:00

Germany	0–4	Netherlands
	Report	Kellerman 19'; Pruyser 43'; Hertzberger 58'; Van der Weerden 60'

Umpires:
Francisco Vázquez (ESP)
Bruce Bale (ENG)

==== Final ====
24 August 2019
20:30

Belgium	5–0	Spain
Dohmen 10'; Van Aubel 17'; Boon 18'; Stockbroekx 27'; Hendrickx 39'	Report

Umpires:
Jakub Mejzlík (CZE)
Ben Göntgen (GER)

== Statistics ==
=== Final standings ===
Rank	Team
Gold medal	Belgium
Silver medal	Spain
Bronze medal	Netherlands
4	Germany
5	England
6	Wales
7	Scotland
8	Ireland

Qualified for the 2020 Summer Olympics

Relegated to the EuroHockey Championship II

=== Awards ===
The following awards were given at the conclusion of the tournament.

Player of the tournament	Goalkeeper of the tournament	Under-21 talent of the tournament	Top goalscorers
(Belgium) Victor Wegnez	(Belgium) Vincent Vanasch	(Netherlands) Jonas de Geus	(Belgium) Tom Boon (Belgium) Alexander Hendrickx (Netherlands) Mirco Pruyser (Spain) Pau Quemada

=== Goalscorers ===
There were 103 goals scored in 20 matches, for an average of 5.15 goals per match.

5 goals

- (Belgium) Tom Boon
- (Belgium) Alexander Hendrickx
- (Netherlands) Mirco Pruyser
- (Spain) Pau Quemada

4 goals

- (England) Sam Ward
- (Germany) Timm Herzbruch
- (Wales) Gareth Furlong

3 goals

- (Belgium) Cédric Charlier
- (Germany) Florian Fuchs
- (Germany) Niklas Wellen
- (Ireland) Shane O'Donoghue
- (Netherlands) Billy Bakker
- (Netherlands) Thierry Brinkman
- (Netherlands) Jip Janssen
- (Netherlands) Bjorn Kellerman

2 goals

- (Belgium) Nicolas De Kerpel
- (Belgium) Victor Wegnez
- (England) Ashley Jackson
- (Germany) Christopher Rühr
- (Germany) Lukas Windfeder
- (Netherlands) Mink van der Weerden
- (Scotland) Kenny Bain
- (Scotland) Craig Falconer
- (Scotland) Cameron Golden
- (Spain) Josep Romeu

1 goal

- (Belgium) Florent Van Aubel
- (Belgium) Thomas Briels
- (Belgium) John-John Dohmen
- (Belgium) Antoine Kina
- (Belgium) Emmanuel Stockbroekx
- (England) James Gall
- (England) Phil Roper
- (England) Zachary Wallace
- (Germany) Mats Grambusch
- (Germany) Tom Grambusch
- (Germany) Martin Häner
- (Germany) Malte Hellwig
- (Ireland) Tim Cross
- (Ireland) Michael Robson
- (Netherlands) Seve van Ass
- (Netherlands) Jeroen Hertzberger
- (Scotland) Nicky Parkes
- (Spain) Diego Arana
- (Spain) Álvaro Iglesias
- (Spain) Viçens Ruiz
- (Spain) Ricardo Sánchez
- (Wales) Owain Dolan-Gray
- (Wales) Benjamin Francis
- (Wales) Rhodri Furlong
- (Wales) Dale Hutchinson
- (Wales) Lewis Prosser

Source: FIH

== See also ==
- 2019 Men's EuroHockey Championship II
- 2019 Men's EuroHockey Junior Championship
- 2019 Women's EuroHockey Nations Championship
