= 2021 Men's EuroHockey Championship =

2021 field hockey championship

Tournament details
- Host country: Netherlands
- City: Amstelveen
- Dates: 4–12 June
- Teams: 8 (from 1 confederation)
- Venue: Wagener Stadium

Final positions
- Champions: Netherlands (6th title)
- Runner-up: Germany
- Third place: Belgium

Tournament statistics
- Matches played: 20
- Goals scored: 121 (6.05 per match)
- Top scorer(s): (Belgium) Tom Boon (England) Sam Ward (6 goals)
- Best player: (Spain) Pau Quemada
- Best young player: (France) Antonin Igau
- Best goalkeeper: (Netherlands) Pirmin Blaak

The 2021 Men's EuroHockey Championship was the 18th edition of the Men's EuroHockey Championship, the biennial international men's field hockey championship of Europe organised by the European Hockey Federation.

The tournament was held alongside the women's tournament at the Wagener Stadium in Amstelveen, Netherlands and was originally scheduled to take place from 20 to 29 August 2021. However, following the postponement of the 2020 Summer Olympics to July and August 2021 because of the COVID-19 pandemic the tournament was rescheduled and took place from 4 to 13 June 2021.

The top five teams qualified for the 2023 FIH Hockey World Cup. The hosts Netherlands won the tournament for the sixth time, beating Germany in a 4–1 penalty shoot out after a 2–2 tie. The previous title holders Belgium won the bronze medal, defeating England with 3–2.

== Qualification ==
Along the hosts, the Netherlands, the top 5 teams at the 2019 EuroHockey Championship, which was held in Antwerp from 16 to 24 August, and the top 2 teams from the 2019 EuroHockey Championships II qualified. The numbers in brackets are the pre-tournament world rankings of when the draw was made.

Dates	Event	Location	Quotas	Qualifier(s)
1 July 2018	Host	—N/a	1	Netherlands (3)
16–24 August 2019	2019 EuroHockey Championship	Antwerp, Belgium	5	Belgium (2); England (7); Germany (6); Spain (8); Wales (18)
28 July – 3 August 2019	2019 EuroHockey Championship II	Cambrai, France	2	France (12); Russia (22)
Total			8	

== Preliminary round ==
The pools were announced on 11 May 2020.

All times are local (UTC+2).

=== Pool A ===
Pos	Team	Pld	W	D	L	GF	GA	GD	Pts	Qualification
1	England	3	3	0	0	10	3	+7	9	Semi-finals and 2023 FIH Hockey World Cup
2	Belgium	3	2	0	1	14	6	+8	6	Semi-finals and 2023 FIH Hockey World Cup
3	Spain	3	1	0	2	9	8	+1	3	
4	Russia	3	0	0	3	3	19	−16	0	

Source: FIH
Rules for classification: 1) points; 2) matches won; 3) goal difference; 4) goals for; 5) head-to-head result; 6) field goals for.

5 June 2021
11:00

England	5–0	Russia
Ansell 32'; Roper 33'; Wallace 44'; Griffiths 47'; Gall 53'	Report

Umpires:
Daniel Rodríguez (ESP)
Michiel Otten (NED)

5 June 2021
13:15

Belgium	4–2	Spain
Hendrickx 9'; Boon 33', 50'; Charlier 45'	Report	Basterra 7'; Lleonart 54'

Umpires:
Coen van Bunge (NED)
Ben Göntgen (GER)

6 June 2021
17:30

Spain	5–1	Russia
Lleonart 8'; Ruiz 12'; Quemada 14', 33'; Tarrés 15'	Report	Matkovskiy 45'

Umpires:
Xavier Fenaert (FRA)
Sébastien Michielsen (BEL)

6 June 2021
19:45

England	2–1	Belgium
Wallace 4'; Ansell 31'	Report	Boon 5'

Umpires:
Ben Göntgen (GER)
Michiel Otten (NED)

8 June 2021
12:30

Belgium	9–2	Russia
Van Aubel 1', 30'; Hendrickx 9', 13', 54'; De Kerpel 10'; Kina 27'; Boon 41'; Briels 56'	Report	Nadyrshin 30'; Kuraev 44'

Umpires:
Sean Edwards (ENG)
Daniel Rodríguez (ESP)

8 June 2021
17:00

Spain	2–3	England
Quemada 27'; Lleonart 49'	Report	Ward 12', 14', 60+'

Umpires:
Coen van Bunge (NED)
Michiel Otten (NED)

=== Pool B ===
Pos	Team	Pld	W	D	L	GF	GA	GD	Pts	Qualification
1	Netherlands (H)	3	2	1	0	11	2	+9	7	Semi-finals and 2023 FIH Hockey World Cup
2	Germany	3	2	1	0	16	8	+8	7	Semi-finals and 2023 FIH Hockey World Cup
3	Wales	3	1	0	2	4	16	−12	3	
4	France	3	0	0	3	7	12	−5	0	

Source: FIH
Rules for classification: 1) points; 2) matches won; 3) goal difference; 4) goals for; 5) head-to-head result; 6) field goals for.
(H) Hosts

4 June 2021
17:00

Germany	8–1	Wales
Staib 12', 59'; Bosserhoff 15'; Kaufmann 18'; Windfeder 25'; Wellen 43'; Rühr 58'; Herzbruch 60+'	Report	G. Furlong 21'

Umpires:
Sean Edwards (ENG)
Xavier Fenaert (FRA)

4 June 2021
20:00

Netherlands	3–0	France
Janssen 21'; Brinkman 30'; Hertzberger 38'	Report

Umpires:
Francisco Vázquez (ESP)
Sébastien Michielsen (BEL)

5 June 2021
20:15

France	2–3	Wales
Marqué 5'; Van Straaten 48'	Report	Dolan-Gray 6'; G. Furlong 10'; Naughalty 60'

Umpires:
Michael Pontus (BEL)
Sean Edwards (ENG)

6 June 2021
15:00

Germany	2–2	Netherlands
Rühr 58'; Windfeder 59'	Report	Van Ass 5'; Brinkman 44'

Umpires:
Dan Barstow (ENG)
Francisco Vázquez (ESP)

8 June 2021
14:45

France	5–6	Germany
Dumont 2'; Van Straaten 4', 19'; Masson 13'; Marqué 22'	Report	Häner 4', 5', 60+'; Wellen 25', 54'; Fuchs 33'

Umpires:
Michael Pontus (BEL)
Dan Barstow (ENG)

8 June 2021
20:00

Netherlands	6–0	Wales
Pruyser 4', 32'; Hertzberger 9'; De Geus 10'; Kemperman 44'; Bakker 60'	Report

Umpires:
Xavier Fenaert (FRA)
Sébastien Michielsen (BEL)

== Fifth to eighth place classification ==
The points obtained in the preliminary round against the other team were carried over.

Pos	Team	Pld	W	D	L	GF	GA	GD	Pts	Qualification
5	Spain	3	2	0	1	13	5	+8	6	2023 FIH Hockey World Cup
6	France	3	2	0	1	11	10	+1	6	
7	Wales	3	1	1	1	7	11	−4	4	
8	Russia	3	0	1	2	9	14	−5	1	

Source: FIH
Rules for classification: 1) points; 2) matches won; 3) goal difference; 4) goals for; 5) head-to-head result; 6) field goals for.

10 June 2021
12:30

Russia	5–6	France
Khairullin 9'; Nadyrshin 17'; Artemov 33'; Skiperskiy 36'; Fattakhov 58'	Report	Rogeau 20', 54'; Van Straaten 55'; Charlet 25', 53'; Clément 37'

Umpires:
Daniel Rodríguez (ESP)
Sean Edwards (ENG)

10 June 2021
14:45

Spain	6–1	Wales
Tarrés 8'; Quemada 10'; Lleonart 11'; Alegre 19', 43'; Miralles 60'	Report	Morgan 43'

Umpires:
Michael Pontus (BEL)
Sébastien Michielsen (BEL)

11 June 2021
13:45

Spain	2–3	France
Lleonart 7'; Quemada 18'	Report	Clément 25'; Van Straaten 49'; Igau 55'

Umpires:
Coen van Bunge (NED)
Michael Pontus (BEL)

11 June 2021
21:00

Wales	3–3	Russia
Naughalty 17', 40'; Jones 24'	Report	Kuraev 6'; Khairullin 43'; Matkovskiy 54'

Umpires:
Xavier Fenaert (FRA)
Daniel Rodríguez (ESP)

== First to fourth place classification ==
Semi-finals
10 June
England	2
Germany	3
10 June
Netherlands (p.s.o.)	2 (3)
Belgium	2 (1)

Final
12 June
Germany	2 (1)
Netherlands (p.s.o.)	2 (4)
Third place
12 June
England	2
Belgium	3

=== Semi-finals ===
10 June 2021
17:00

England	2–3	Germany
Dixon 4'; Ward 59'	Report	Häner 1'; Zwicker 9'; Wellen 13'

Umpires:
Francisco Vázquez (ESP)
Coen van Bunge (NED)

10 June 2021
20:00

Netherlands	2–2	Belgium
Van Ass 52'; Janssen 56'	Report	De Kerpel 35'; Hendrickx 53'
Penalties
Hertzberger (penalty shoot-out scored); Brinkman (penalty shoot-out missed); Kemperman (penalty shoot-out missed); Van Dam (penalty shoot-out scored); Croon (penalty shoot-out scored)	3–1	(penalty shoot-out scored) Denayer; (penalty shoot-out missed) Wegnez; (penalty shoot-out missed) Van Aubel; (penalty shoot-out missed) A. Van Doren

Umpires:
Ben Göntgen (GER)
Dan Barstow (ENG)

=== Third and fourth place ===
12 June 2021
10:00

England	2–3	Belgium
Ward 32', 53'	Report	Boon 12', 52'; Briels 41'

Umpires:
Ben Göntgen (GER)
Michiel Otten (NED)

=== Final ===
12 June 2021
12:30

Germany	2–2	Netherlands
Rühr 21'; Staib 56'	Report	Kemperman 34'; Janssen 60+'
Penalties
Fuchs (penalty shoot-out scored); Rühr (penalty shoot-out missed); Herzbruch (penalty shoot-out missed)	1–4	(penalty shoot-out scored) Hertzberger; (penalty shoot-out scored) Brinkman; (penalty shoot-out scored) Kemperman; (penalty shoot-out scored) Van Dam

Umpires:
Dan Barstow (ENG)
Francisco Vázquez (ESP)

== Statistics ==
=== Final standings ===
Rank	Team
1st place, gold medalist(s)	Netherlands
2nd place, silver medalist(s)	Germany
3rd place, bronze medalist(s)	Belgium
4	England
5	Spain
6	France
7	Wales
8	Russia

Team qualified for the 2023 World Cup

=== Awards ===
The following awards were given at the conclusion of the tournament.

Player of the tournament	Goalkeeper of the tournament	Under-21 talent of the tournament	Top goalscorers
(Spain) Pau Quemada	(Netherlands) Pirmin Blaak	(France) Antonin Igau	(Belgium) Tom Boon (England) Sam Ward

=== Goalscorers ===
There were 121 goals scored in 20 matches, for an average of 6.05 goals per match.

6 goals

- (Belgium) Tom Boon
- (England) Sam Ward

5 goals

- (Belgium) Alexander Hendrickx
- (France) Pieter van Straaten
- (Spain) Xavi Lleonart
- (Spain) Pau Quemada

4 goals

- (Germany) Martin Häner
- (Germany) Niklas Wellen

3 goals

- (Germany) Christopher Rühr
- (Germany) Constantin Staib
- (Netherlands) Jip Janssen
- (Wales) Joe Naughalty

2 goals

- (Belgium) Thomas Briels
- (Belgium) Florent Van Aubel
- (Belgium) Nicolas De Kerpel
- (Germany) Lukas Windfeder
- (England) Liam Ansell
- (England) Zachary Wallace
- (France) Victor Charlet
- (France) Timothée Clément
- (France) Benjamin Marqué
- (France) Blaise Rogeau
- (Netherlands) Seve van Ass
- (Netherlands) Thierry Brinkman
- (Netherlands) Jeroen Hertzberger
- (Netherlands) Robbert Kemperman
- (Netherlands) Mirco Pruyser
- (Russia) Marat Khairullin
- (Russia) Andrey Kuraev
- (Russia) Semen Matkovskiy
- (Russia) Artem Nadyrshin
- (Spain) David Alegre
- (Spain) Joan Tarrés
- (Wales) Gareth Furlong

1 goal

- (Belgium) Cédric Charlier
- (Belgium) Antoine Kina
- (England) Adam Dixon
- (England) James Gall
- (England) Chris Griffiths
- (England) Phil Roper
- (France) Nicolas Dumont
- (France) Antonin Igau
- (France) Charles Masson
- (Germany) Niklas Bosserhoff
- (Germany) Florian Fuchs
- (Germany) Timm Herzbruch
- (Germany) Paul-Philipp Kaufmann
- (Germany) Martin Zwicker
- (Netherlands) Billy Bakker
- (Netherlands) Jonas de Geus
- (Russia) Evgeny Artemov
- (Russia) Linar Fattakhov
- (Russia) Alexander Skiperskiy
- (Spain) José Basterra
- (Spain) Marc Miralles
- (Spain) Viçens Ruiz
- (Wales) Owain Dolan-Gray
- (Wales) Hywel Jones
- (Wales) Jolyon Morgan

Source: FIH

== See also ==
- 2021 Men's EuroHockey Championship II
- 2021 Women's EuroHockey Nations Championship
