= Hockey Junior Asia Cup =

Hockey Junior Asia Cup may refer to:

- Men's Hockey Junior Asia Cup
- Women's Hockey Junior Asia Cup
