= Hockey Junior World Cup =

Hockey Junior World Cup may refer to:

- Men's FIH Hockey Junior World Cup
- Women's FIH Hockey Junior World Cup
