= 2010–11 Euro Hockey League =

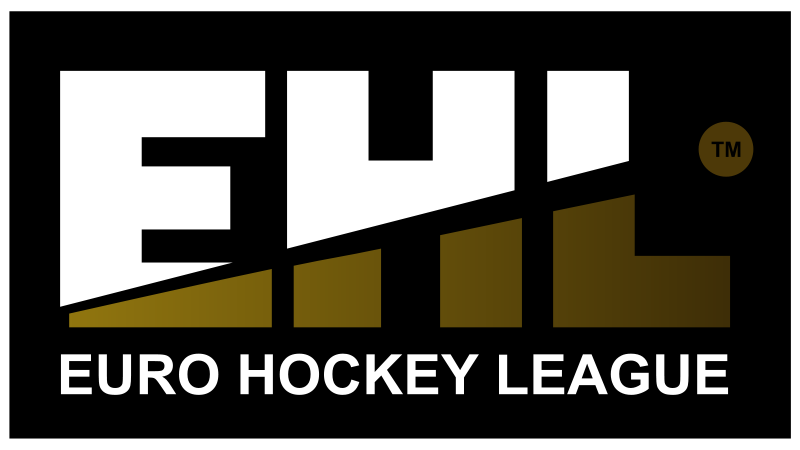

Tournament details
- Dates: 15 October 2010 – 12 June 2011
- Teams: 24 (from 12 associations)
- Venue: 4 (in 4 host cities)

Final positions
- Champions: (Netherlands) HGC (1st title)
- Runner-up: (Spain) Club de Campo
- Third place: (England) Reading

Tournament statistics
- Matches played: 40
- Goals scored: 244 (6.1 per match)
- Top scorer: (Australia) Lucas Judge (7 goals)
- Best player: (Canada) Rob Short

The 2010–11 Euro Hockey League was the fourth season of the Euro Hockey League, Europe's premier club field hockey tournament organized by the EHF. It was held at four different locations from October 2010 until June 2011.

The final was played between Club de Campo and HGC at De Roggewoning in Wassenaar, Netherlands. HGC beat Club de Campo 1–0 to win their first title. UHC Hamburg were the defending champions, but they were eliminated by Bloemendaal in the round of 16. Reading took the bronze medal.

== Association team allocation ==
Location of teams in 2010–11 Euro Hockey League.
Pink: Group A; Green: Group B; Deep Pink: Group C; Yellow: Group D;
Red: Group E; Cyan: Group F; Blue: Group G; Purple: Group H
Location of Benelux teams in 2010–11 Euro Hockey League

A total of 24 teams from 12 of the 45 EHF member associations participated in the 2010–11 Euro Hockey League. The association ranking based on the EHL country coefficients is used to determine the number of participating teams for each association:

- Associations 1–4 each have three teams qualify.
- Associations 5–8 each have two teams qualify.
- Associations 9–12 each have one team qualify.

=== Association ranking ===
Rank	Team	2007/08 25 %	2008/09 50 %	2009/10 100 %	TOTAL
1	Netherlands	6,000	14,834	29,333	50,167
2	Germany	3,833	8,834	23,667	36,334
3	Spain	5,083	8,000	20,667	33,750
4	England	4,583	8,667	14,667	27,917
5	Belgium	2,500	9,250	14,500	26,250
6	Ireland	2,500	5,750	8,500	16,750
7	Poland	2,375	4,500	9,500	16,375
8	Russia	2,500	4,250	9,500	16,250
9	France	3,125	5,250	7,500	15,875
10	Scotland	2,625	3,250	8,500	14,375
11	Ukraine	2,000	1,750	8,000	11,750
12	Belarus	0,000	4,000	6,000	10,000
13	Italy	1,500	2,750	5,000	9,250
14	Switzerland	1,125	3,000	3,500	7,625
15	Wales	0,750	0,000	3,000	3,750
16	Austria	1,125	2,000	-	3,125
17	Czech Republic	1,000	0,000	-	1,000
18	Croatia	0,000	1,000	-	1,000

=== Teams ===
Qualified teams for 2010–11 Euro Hockey League
(Netherlands) Bloemendaal	(Netherlands) HGC	(Netherlands) Oranje Zwart	(Germany) Rot-Weiss Köln
(Germany) UHC Hamburg	(Germany) Mannheimer HC	(Spain) Atlètic Terrassa	(Spain) Club de Campo
(Spain) Real Club de Polo	(England) East Grinstead	(England) Beeston	(England) Reading
(Belgium) Dragons	(Belgium) Racing	(Ireland) Pembroke Wanderers	(Ireland) Glenanne
(Poland) Grunwald Poznań	(Poland) Pomorzanin Torún	(Russia) Dinamo Kazan	(Russia) Izmaylovo
(France) Montrouge	(Scotland) Kelburne	(Ukraine) Olympia Kolos Sekvoia	(Belarus) Stroitel Brest

== Round One ==
The 24 teams were drawn into eight pools of three. In each pool, teams played against each other once in a round-robin format. The pool winners and runners-up advanced to the round of 16. Pools A, C, D, and G were played in Terrassa, Spain from 29 to 31 October 2010 and the other pool were played in Eindhoven, Netherlands from 15 to 17 October 2017. If a game was won, the winning team received 5 points. A draw resulted in both teams receiving 2 points. A loss gave the losing team 1 point unless the losing team lost by 3 or more goals, then they received 0 points.

=== Pool A ===
Pos	Team	Pld	W	D	L	GF	GA	GD	Pts	Qualification
1	(Netherlands) Bloemendaal	2	2	0	0	17	3	+14	10	Advance to knockout stage
2	(England) Reading	2	1	0	1	10	7	+3	6	Advance to knockout stage
3	(Belarus) Stroitel Brest	2	0	0	2	2	19	−17	0	

Source: EHF

29 October 2010
14:30

Reading (England)	7–2	(Belarus) Stroitel Brest
Springham 8'; Tyler 16'; R. Mantell 21'; Cargo 28'; S. Mantell 30', 63'; D'Souza 65'	Report	Hancharou 49'; Radzivinovich 55'

Estadi de Hockey Josep Marquès, Terrassa
Umpires:
Geoff Conn (IRL)
Fabian Blasch (GER)

30 October 2010
14:30

Stroitel Brest (Belarus)	0–12	(Netherlands) Bloemendaal
	Report	Brouwer 1', 23', 55'; N. Meijer 5'; O. Meijer 20', 29'; Jolie 22'; Hofman 25'; Bovendeert 26'; Van Kan 51'; De Nooijer 59', 64'

Estadi de Hockey Josep Marquès, Terrassa
Umpires:
Will Drury (WAL)
Andrew Mair (SCO)

31 October 2010
14:30

Bloemendaal (Netherlands)	5–3	(England) Reading
Hofman 4'; Van Kan 13', 48'; Brouwer 39'; De Nooijer 43'	Report	S. Mantell 40'; R. Mantell 62'; Cargo 63'

Estadi de Hockey Josep Marquès, Terrassa
Umpires:
Mikael Mattsson (SWE)
Marcelo Servetto (ESP)

=== Pool B ===
Pos	Team	Pld	W	D	L	GF	GA	GD	Pts	Qualification
1	(Spain) Club de Campo	2	1	1	0	8	5	+3	7	Advance to knockout stage
2	(Germany) Rot-Weiss Köln	2	1	1	0	6	4	+2	7	Advance to knockout stage
3	(Belgium) Racing Club de Bruxelles	2	0	0	2	5	10	−5	1	

Source: EHF

15 October 2010
12:00

Racing Club de Bruxelles (Belgium)	2–4	(Germany) Rot-Weiss Köln
Boon 52', 68'	Report	C. Zeller 11'; D. Montag 25', 61'; Kemperman 42'

Sportpark Aalsterweg, Eindhoven
Umpires:
Hamish Jamson (ENG)
Andrei Isaev (RUS)

16 October 2010
09:30

Club de Campo (Spain)	6–3	(Belgium) Racing Club de Bruxelles
Tubau 19'; Schickendantz 29', 40'; Sahuquillo 30'; Fernández 39'; Rodriguez 58'	Report	L. De Mot 15'; Boon 45'; Bourgoignie 53'

Sportpark Aalsterweg, Eindhoven
Umpires:
Christian Blasch (GER)
Dan Barstow (ENG)

17 October 2010
17:00

Rot-Weiss Köln (Germany)	2–2	(Spain) Club de Campo
Brandes 16'; Bauwens-Adenauer 60'	Report	Markowsky 19'; Lainz 58'

Sportpark Aalsterweg, Eindhoven
Umpires:
Roderick Wijsmuller (NED)
Hamish Jamso (ENG)

=== Pool C ===
Pos	Team	Pld	W	D	L	GF	GA	GD	Pts	Qualification
1	(England) Beeston	2	2	0	0	5	3	+2	10	Advance to knockout stage
2	(Spain) Atlètic Terrassa (H)	2	1	0	1	5	4	+1	6	Advance to knockout stage
3	(France) Montrouge	2	0	0	2	4	7	−3	2	

Source: EHF
(H) Hosts

29 October 2010
12:00

Beeston (England)	3–2	(France) Montrouge
Whiteman 18'; Monte 23'; Jones 62'	Report	Sanchez 50'; Mayer 68'

Estadi de Hockey Josep Marquès, Terrassa
Umpires:
Marcelo Sevetto (ESP)
Francesco Parisi (ITA)

30 October 2010
12:00

Montrouge (France)	2–4	(Spain) Atlètic Terrassa
O.G. 20'; Perry 60'	Report	Ballbe 6'; Freixa 35', 36'; Michel 42'

Estadi de Hockey Josep Marquès, Terrassa
Umpires:
Andrew Kennedy (ENG)
Fabian Blasch (GER)

31 October 2010
12:00

Atlètic Terrassa (Spain)	1–2	(England) Beeston
Michel 33'	Report	Monte 21', 26'

Estadi de Hockey Josep Marquès, Terrassa
Umpires:
Geoff Conn (IRL)
Will Drury (WAL)

=== Pool D ===
Pos	Team	Pld	W	D	L	GF	GA	GD	Pts	Qualification
1	(England) East Grinstead	2	2	0	0	12	4	+8	10	Advance to knockout stage
2	(Spain) Real Club de Polo	2	0	1	1	5	6	−1	3	Advance to knockout stage
3	(Scotland) Kelburne	2	0	1	1	3	10	−7	2	

Source: EHF

29 October 2010
17:00

Real Club de Polo (Spain)	2–2	(Scotland) Kelburne
Dabanch 34', 64'	Report	A. Forsyth 46'; Nelson 65'

Estadi de Hockey Josep Marquès, Terrassa
Umpires:
Andrew Kennedy (ENG)
Will Drury (WAL)

30 October 2010
17:00

Kelburne (Scotland)	1–8	(England) East Grinstead
O.G. 63'	Report	Cheesman 6'; Pearn 8'; Grambusch 13'; A. Jackson 15', 44'; Carr 35', 70'; W. Jackson 57'

Estadi de Hockey Josep Marquès, Terrassa
Umpires:
Francesco Parisi (ITA)
Geoff Conn (IRL)

31 October 2010
17:00

East Grinstead (England)	4–3	(Spain) Real Club de Polo
Hall 25', 28'; De Prez 50'; Cheesman 63'	Report	Quemada 8'; Dabanch 44', 57'

Estadi de Hockey Josep Marquès, Terrassa
Umpires:
Andrew Mair (SCO)
Michael Gholami-Eilmer (AUT)

=== Pool E ===
Pos	Team	Pld	W	D	L	GF	GA	GD	Pts	Qualification
1	(Belgium) Dragons	2	2	0	0	9	3	+6	10	Advance to knockout stage
2	(Germany) UHC Hamburg	2	1	0	1	8	4	+4	6	Advance to knockout stage
3	(Russia) Izmaylovo	2	0	0	2	1	11	−10	0	

Source: EHF

15 October 2010
14:30

Izmaylovo (Russia)	1–5	(Belgium) Dragons
Komarov 14'	Report	C. Vandeweghe 8', 59'; Van Aubel 35'; Denayer 39'; Petre 60'

Sportpark Aalsterweg, Eindhoven
Umpires:
Francisco Vazquez Lopez (ESP)
Warren McCully (IRL)

16 October 2010
12:00

UHC Hamburg (Germany)	6–0	(Russia) Izmaylovo
Breitenstein 12', 21'; Korn 15', 65'; Miltkau 18', 60'	Report

Sportpark Aalsterweg, Eindhoven
Umpires:
Roderick Wijsmuller (NED)
Gregory Uyttenhove (BEL)

17 October 2010
09:30

Dragons (Belgium)	4–2	(Germany) UHC Hamburg
Pangrazio 12'; C. Vandeweghe 22'; Luypaert 58'; Van Aubel 60'	Report	Miltkau 51'; Neumann 57'

Sportpark Aalsterweg, Eindhoven
Umpires:
Francisco Vazquez Lopez (ESP)
Dan Barstow (ENG)

=== Pool F ===
Pos	Team	Pld	W	D	L	GF	GA	GD	Pts	Qualification
1	(Netherlands) HGC	2	2	0	0	13	4	+9	10	Advance to knockout stage
2	(Ireland) Pembroke Wanderers	2	1	0	1	6	7	−1	6	Advance to knockout stage
3	(Ukraine) Olympia Kolos Sekvoia	2	0	0	2	5	13	−8	1	

Source: EHF

15 October 2010
09:30

Pembroke Wanderers (Ireland)	4–3	(Ukraine) Olympia Kolos Sekvoia
Wilson 16'; Good 17'; Panther 66', 68'	Report	Nosenko 32'; Shvets 57'; Serdiuk 57'

Sportpark Aalsterweg, Eindhoven
Umpires:
Roderick Wijsmuller (NED)
Luca Ferrara (ITA)

16 October 2010
14:30

Olympia Kolos Sekvoia (Ukraine)	2–9	(Netherlands) HGC
Ozerskyi 36'; Yasinskyi 66'	Report	Dancer 13'; Kranstauber 18', 62'; Brasem 24', 39'; Mohlmann 25'; Van der Kamp 28'; D. van Ass 32'; Van der Linden 47'

Sportpark Aalsterweg, Eindhoven
Umpires:
Warren McCully (IRL)
Luca Ferrara (ITA)

17 October 2010
12:00

HGC (Netherlands)	4–2	(Ireland) Pembroke Wanderers
Brasem 9'; D. van Ass 10', 50'; Mohlmann 41'	Report	Panther 43'; Wilson 58'

Sportpark Aalsterweg, Eindhoven
Umpires:
Gregory Uyttenhove (BEL)
Andrei Isaev (RUS)

=== Pool G ===
Pos	Team	Pld	W	D	L	GF	GA	GD	Pts	Qualification
1	(Germany) Mannheimer HC	2	2	0	0	7	2	+5	10	Advance to knockout stage
2	(Ireland) Glenanne	2	0	1	1	3	4	−1	3	Advance to knockout stage
3	(Poland) Grunwald Poznań	2	0	1	1	3	7	−4	2	

Source: EHF

29 October 2010
09:30

Mannheimer HC (Germany)	2–1	(Ireland) Glennane
Bernatek 33'; McCann 40'	Report	Ga. Shaw 18'

Estadi de Hockey Josep Marquès, Terrassa
Umpires:
Andrew Mair (SCO)
Mikael Mattsson (SWE)

30 October 2010
09:30

Glenanne (Ireland)	2–2	(Poland) Grunwald Poznań
O'Donoghue 14'; McGuinness 51'	Report	Dutkiewicz 40', 60'

Estadi de Hockey Josep Marquès, Terrassa
Umpires:
Marcelo Servetto (ESP)
Michael Gholami-Eilmer (AUT)

31 October 2010
09:30

Grunwald Poznań (Poland)	1–5	(Germany) Mannheimer HC
Dutkiewicz 53'	Report	Prochazka 5'; Pehlke 8', 45'; O.G. 28'; McCann 66'

Estadi de Hockey Josep Marquès, Terrassa
Umpires:
Andrew Kennedy (ENG)
Francesco Parisi (ITA)

=== Pool H ===
Pos	Team	Pld	W	D	L	GF	GA	GD	Pts	Qualification
1	(Netherlands) Oranje Zwart (H)	2	2	0	0	17	3	+14	10	Advance to knockout stage
2	(Russia) Dinamo Kazan	2	0	1	1	6	11	−5	2	Advance to knockout stage
3	(Poland) Pomorzanin Torún	2	0	1	1	5	14	−9	2	

Source: EHF
(H) Hosts

15 October 2010
17:00

Pomorzanin Torún (Poland)	4–4	(Russia) Dinamo Kazan
Kunklewski 25'; Zakszewski 28'; Nowakowski 54', 58'	Report	Warsi 27', 39'; Sibaev 40'; Gevorkyan 51'

Sportpark Aalsterweg, Eindhoven
Umpires:
Gregory Uyttenhove (BEL)
Christian Blasch (GER)

16 October 2010
17:00

Oranje Zwart (Netherlands)	10–1	(Poland) Pomorzanin Torún
Van der Schoot 3'; Judge 6', 17', 48', 69'; Maartens 11'; Van der Weerden 22', 61'; Briels 25'; Alegre 27'	Report	Zielinski 23'

Sportpark Aalsterweg, Eindhoven
Umpires:
Hamish Jamson (ENG)
Francisco Vazquez Lopez (ESP)

17 October 2010
14:30

Dinamo Kazan (Russia)	2–7	(Netherlands) Oranje Zwart
Gevorkyan 38'; Warsi 69'	Report	Baart 2'; Judge 18', 43'; Alegre 24'; Hammond 27'; Van der Weerden 32', 66'

Sportpark Aalsterweg, Eindhoven
Umpires:
Christian Blasch (GER)
Warren McCully (IRL)

== Knockout stage ==
The round of 16 and the quarter-finals were played in Bloemendaal, Netherlands from 22 to 25 April 2011 and the semi-finals, bronze medal match and the final were played in Wassenaar, Netherlands from 11 to 12 June 2011.

=== Bracket ===
Round of 16
23 April – Bloemendaal
(Belgium) Dragons	3
(Germany) Rot-Weiss Köln	2
23 April – Bloemendaal
(England) East Grinstead	3
(England) Reading	5
22 April – Bloemendaal
(Germany) Mannheimer HC	1 (2)
(Spain) Atlètic Terrassa (s.o.)	1 (3)
22 April – Bloemendaal
(Spain) Club de Campo	11
(Ireland) Pembroke Wanderers	0
23 April – Bloemendaal
(Netherlands) Bloemendaal	2
(Germany) UHC Hamburg	1
23 April – Bloemendaal
(Netherlands) Oranje Zwart (s.o.)	2 (2)
(Spain) Real Club de Polo	2 (1)
22 April – Bloemendaal
(England) Beeston	2
(Russia) Dinamo Kazan	0
22 April – Bloemendaal
(Netherlands) HGC	2
(Ireland) Glenanne	0

Quarter-finals
25 April – Bloemendaal
(Belgium) Dragons	2 (1)
(England) Reading (s.o.)	2 (2)
24 April – Bloemendaal
(Spain) Atlètic Terrassa	1 (0)
(Spain) Club de Campo (s.o.)	1 (2)
25 April – Bloemendaal
(Netherlands) Bloemendaal	1 (0)
(Netherlands) Oranje Zwart (s.o.)	1 (2)
24 April – Bloemendaal
(England) Beeston	3
(Netherlands) HGC	4

Semi-finals
11 June – Wassenaar
(England) Reading	0
(Spain) Club de Campo	3
11 June – Wassenaar
(Netherlands) Oranje Zwart	0
(Netherlands) HGC	3

Final
12 June – Wassenaar
(Spain) Club de Campo	0
(Netherlands) HGC	1
Bronze medal match
12 June – Wassenaar
(England) Reading	3
(Netherlands) Oranje Zwart	2

=== Round of 16 ===
22 April 2011
09:30

Beeston (England)	2–0	(Russia) Dinamo Kazan
Arnold 45'; Ward 56'	Report

Sportpark 't Kopje, Bloemendaal
Umpires:
Francisco Vazquez Lopez (ESP)
Björn Bachmann (GER)

22 April 2011
12:00

Club de Campo (Spain)	11–0	(Ireland) Pembroke Wanderers
Rodríguez 11'; Fernández 17'; Sojo 17', 64'; Lainz 20'; Tubau 23', 44'; Sahuquillo 34', 57'; Iding 41', 68'	Report

Sportpark 't Kopje, Bloemendaal
Umpires:
Andy Mair (SCO)
Marcin Grochal (POL)

22 April 2011
14:30

HGC (Netherlands)	2–0	(Ireland) Glenanne
Grimes 8'; R. Vila 68'	Report

Sportpark 't Kopje, Bloemendaal
Umpires:
Hamish Jamson (ENG)
Nathan Stagno (GIB)

22 April 2011
17:00

Mannheimer HC (Germany)	1–1 (a.e.t.)	(Spain) Atlètic Terrassa
Procházka 3'	Report	Delàs 37'
Penalties
Pehlke (penalty shoot-out scored); Nguyen (penalty shoot-out missed); Meinert (penalty shoot-out scored); Meinert (penalty shoot-out missed)	2–3	(penalty shoot-out scored) Enrique; (penalty shoot-out scored) Guerrero; (penalty shoot-out missed) Enrich; (penalty shoot-out scored) Enrique

Sportpark 't Kopje, Bloemendaal
Umpires:
Roel van Eert (NED)
Geoff Conn (IRL)

23 April 2011
09:30

East Grinstead (England)	3–5	(England) Reading
Hall 45', 47'; Carr 57'	Report	R. Mantell 3'; Clarke 21'; Cargo 38', 53'; Springham 65'

Sportpark 't Kopje, Bloemendaal
Umpires:
Nathan Stagno (GIB)
Björn Bachmann (GER)

23 April 2011
12:00

Oranje Zwart (Netherlands)	2–2 (a.e.t.)	(Spain) Real Club de Polo
Judge 36'; O.G. 65'	Report	Quemada 30', 67'
Penalties
Gougnard (penalty shoot-out scored); Alegre (penalty shoot-out missed); Hammond (penalty shoot-out missed); Gougnard (penalty shoot-out scored)	2–1	(penalty shoot-out missed) Fàbregas; (penalty shoot-out missed) Piera; (penalty shoot-out scored) Wein; (penalty shoot-out missed) Fàbregas

Sportpark 't Kopje, Bloemendaal
Umpires:
Hamish Jamson (ENG)
Vincent Loos (BEL)

23 April 2011
14:30

Bloemendaal (Netherlands)	2–1	(Germany) UHC Hamburg
Jolie 51'; N. Meijer 65'	Report	Korn 46'

Sportpark 't Kopje, Bloemendaal
Umpires:
Andy Mair (SCO)
Geoff Conn (IRL)

23 April 2011
17:00

Dragons (Belgium)	3–2	(Germany) Rot-Weiss Köln
Van Aubel 8'; Denayer 44'; J. Thys 63'	Report	Weißenborn 14'; Meurer 50'

Sportpark 't Kopje, Bloemendaal
Umpires:
Roel van Eert (NED)
Marcin Grochal (POL)

=== Quarter-finals ===
24 April 2011
12:00

Atlètic Terrassa (Spain)	1–1 (a.e.t.)	(Spain) Club de Campo
Oliva 12'	Report	Schickendantz 50'
Penalties
Enrique (penalty shoot-out missed); Oliva (penalty shoot-out missed)	0–2	(penalty shoot-out scored) Schickendantz; (penalty shoot-out scored) B. Pérez-Pla

Sportpark 't Kopje, Bloemendaal
Umpires:
Roel van Eert (NED)
Marcin Grochal (POL)

24 April 2011
14:30

Beeston (England)	3–4	(Netherlands) HGC
Monte 21', 46'; Wilson 64'	Report	R. Vila 18'; S. van Ass 33'; Kranstauber 52'; Grimes 60'

Sportpark 't Kopje, Bloemendaal
Umpires:
Vincent Loos (BEL)
Francisco Vazquez Lopez (ESP)

25 April 2011
12:00

Dragons (Belgium)	2–2 (a.e.t.)	(England) Reading
O.G. 22'; Pangrazio 70'	Report	D'Souza 17'; Mackay 55'
Penalties
Van Aubel (penalty shoot-out missed); Magee (penalty shoot-out scored); L. Vandeweghe (penalty shoot-out missed)	1–2	(penalty shoot-out scored) Clarke; (penalty shoot-out missed) S. Mantell; (penalty shoot-out scored) Mackay

Sportpark 't Kopje, Bloemendaal
Umpires:
Geoff Conn (IRL)
Nathan Stagno (GIB)

25 April 2011
14:30

Bloemendaal (Netherlands)	1–1 (a.e.t.)	(Netherlands) Oranje Zwart
Van Mierlo 52'	Report	Galema 31'
Penalties
Brouwer (penalty shoot-out missed); Docherty (penalty shoot-out missed)	0–2	(penalty shoot-out scored) Gougnard; (penalty shoot-out scored) Alegre

Sportpark 't Kopje, Bloemendaal
Umpires:
Andy Mair (SCO)
Hamish Jamson (ENG)

=== Semi-finals ===
11 June 2011
11:30

Reading (England)	0–3	(Spain) Club de Campo
	Report	Lainz 23'; Rodríguez 53'; Mir 59'

De Roggewoning, Wassenaar
Umpires:
Christian Blasch (GER)
Marcin Grochal (POL)

11 June 2011
14:00

Oranje Zwart (Netherlands)	0–3	(Netherlands) HGC
	Report	Kranstauber 15', 51'; Short 35'

De Roggewoning, Wassenaar
Umpires:
Ged Curran (SCO)
Colin Hutchinson (IRL)

=== Bronze medal match ===
12 June 2011
10:30

Reading (England)	3–2	(Netherlands) Oranje Zwart
Dick 10'; R. Mantell 35'; Joyce 68'	Report	De Voogd 3'; Baart 59'

De Roggewoning, Wassenaar
Umpires:
Ged Curran (SCO)
Colin Hutchinson (IRL)

=== Final ===
12 June 2011
15:40

Club de Campo (Spain)	0–1	(Netherlands) HGC
	Report	Kranstauber 61'

De Roggewoning, Wassenaar
Umpires:
Christian Blasch (GER)
Nathan Stagno (GIB)

== Statistics ==
=== Top goalscorers ===
Rank	Player	Team	FG	PC	PS	Goals
1	(Australia) Lucas Judge	(Netherlands) Oranje Zwart	7	0	0	7
2	(Netherlands) Timmo Kranstauber	(Netherlands) HGC	0	4	2	6
3	(England) Andrew Monte	(England) Beeston	0	5	0	5
4	(England) Danny Hall	(England) East Grinstead	4	0	0	4
4	(Ireland) Chris Cargo	(England) Reading	4	0	0	4
4	(Netherlands) Ronald Brouwer	(Netherlands) Bloemendaal	4	0	0	4
4	(Spain) Gabriel Dabanch	(Spain) Real Club de Polo	4	0	0	4
4	(England) Richard Mantell	(England) Reading	0	4	0	4
4	(Netherlands) Mink van der Weerden	(Netherlands) Oranje Zwart	0	4	0	4
