= 2013–14 Euro Hockey League =

Seventh season of the Euro Hockey League

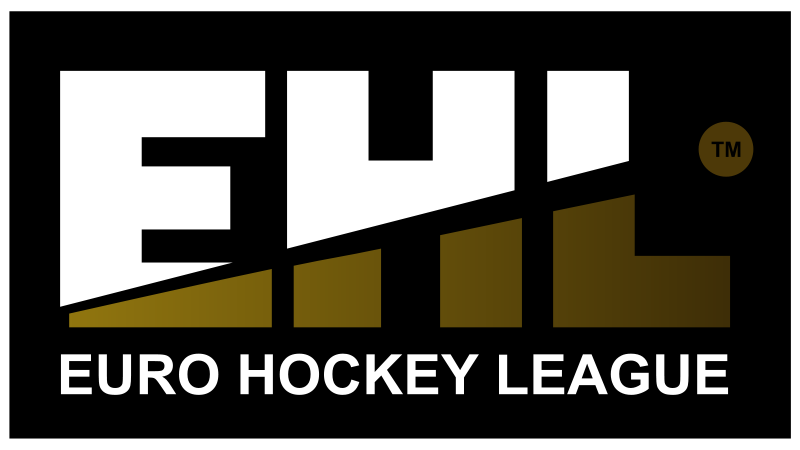

Tournament details
- Host countries: France; Netherlands; Spain
- Dates: 11 October 2013 – 21 April 2014
- Teams: 24 (from 12 associations)
- Venue: 3 (in 3 host cities)

Final positions
- Champions: (Germany) Harvestehuder THC (1st title)
- Runner-up: (Netherlands) Oranje Zwart
- Third place: (Belgium) Dragons

Tournament statistics
- Matches played: 40
- Goals scored: 188 (4.7 per match)
- Top scorer(s): Michael Körper (Harvestehuder THC); Mink van der Weerden (Oranje Zwart) (6 goals)

The 2013–14 Euro Hockey League was the seventh season of the Euro Hockey League, Europe's premier club field hockey tournament organized by the European Hockey Federation. The group phase was held in Barcelona, Spain, and Lille, France, in October 2013 and the knockout stage was held in Eindhoven, Netherlands in April 2014.

The final was played between Harvestehuder THC and Oranje Zwart at Sportpark Aalsterweg, Eindhoven, Netherlands. Harvestehude defeated the hosts Oranje Zwart 3–1 in a shoot-out after a 1–1 draw. Bloemendaal were the defending champions but they did not qualify for this season's edition. Dragons took the bronze medal.

== Association team allocation ==
A total of 24 teams from 12 of the 45 EHF member associations participated in the 2013–14 Euro Hockey League. The association ranking based on the EHL country coefficients is used to determine the number of participating teams for each association:

- Associations 1–4 each have three teams qualify.
- Associations 5–8 each have two teams qualify.
- Associations 9–12 each have one team qualify.

=== EHL Rankings ===
Association ranking for 2013–14 Euro Hockey League
Rank	Change	Association	Points	Teams
1	Steady	Netherlands	47.252	3
2	Steady	Germany	36.917	3
3	▲1	Belgium	34.000	3
4	▼1	England	31.667	3
5	Steady	Spain	24.167	2
6	Steady	Russia	16.375	2
7	▲3	Poland	15.750	2
8	▼1	France	15.750	2
9	▼1	Scotland	14.750	1
10	▲2	Austria	13.500	1
11	Steady	Belarus	11.500	1
12	▲4	Wales	11.250	1
13	▼4	Ireland	11.250	0
14	▲1	Ukraine	8.250	0
15	▼2	Italy	7.500	0
16	▼2	Switzerland	5.000	0
17	Steady	Czech Republic	0.250	0

=== Teams ===
Champions
(Netherlands) Rotterdam	(Spain) Real Club de Polo	(Scotland) Kelburne
(Germany) Rot-Weiss Köln	(Russia) Dinamo Kazan	(Austria) Arminen
(Belgium) Waterloo Ducks	(Poland) Grunwald Poznań	(Belarus) Stroitel Brest
(England) Beeston	(France) Saint Germain	(Wales) Cardiff & Met
Runners-up		Third placed
(Netherlands) Oranje Zwart	(Spain) Club de Campo	(Netherlands) Kampong
(Germany) Uhlenhorst Mülheim	(Russia) Dinamo Elektrostal	(Germany) Harvestehuder THC
(Belgium) Racing Club de Bruxelles	(Poland) Politechnika Poznanska	(Belgium) Dragons
(England) Surbiton	(France) Lille	(England) Reading

== Group phase ==
The 24 teams were drawn into eight pools of three. In each pool, teams played against each other once in a round-robin format. The pool winners and runners-up advanced to the round of 16. Pools D, E, F, and G were played in Barcelona, Spain, from 11 to 13 October 2013 and the other pools were played in Lille, France, from 25 to 27 October 2013. If a game was won, the winning team received five points. A draw resulted in both teams receiving two points. A loss gave the losing team one point unless the losing team lost by three or more goals, then they received zero points.

=== Pool A ===
Pos	Team	Pld	W	D	L	GF	GA	GD	Pts	Qualification
1	(Netherlands) Rotterdam	2	2	0	0	8	2	+6	10	Advance to knockout stage
2	(England) Reading	2	1	0	1	4	4	0	5	Advance to knockout stage
3	(France) Lille (H)	2	0	0	2	1	7	−6	0	

Source: EHF
(H) Hosts

25 October 2013
17:00

Rotterdam (Netherlands)	4–1	(France) Lille
J. Hertzberger 34'; O.G. 54'; Thys 62', 69'	Report	A. Fourcroy 31'

Stade de la reu Henri Delescaux, Lille
Umpires:
Andrew Kennedy (ENG)
Jakub Mejzlik (CZE)

26 October 2013
14:30

Rotterdam (Netherlands)	4–1	(England) Reading
F. Hagemans 14'; Kellerman 41', 53'; Van Ass 56'	Report	Clarke 54'

Stade de la reu Henri Delescaux, Lille
Umpires:
Ben Goentgen (GER)
Warren McCully (IRL)

27 October 2013
17:00

Reading (England)	3–0	(France) Lille
R. Mantell 16', 39'; Carson 64'	Report

Stade de la reu Henri Delescaux, Lille
Umpires:
Bart de Liefde (NED)
Jakub Mejzlik (CZE)

=== Pool B ===
Pos	Team	Pld	W	D	L	GF	GA	GD	Pts	Qualification
1	(Netherlands) Kampong	2	2	0	0	18	2	+16	10	Advance to knockout stage
2	(Germany) Rot-Weiss Köln	2	1	0	1	7	5	+2	6	Advance to knockout stage
3	(Belarus) Stroitel Brest	2	0	0	2	1	19	−18	0	

Source: EHF

25 October 2013
12:00

Rot-Weiss Köln (Germany)	5–1	(Belarus) Stroitel Brest
Montag 17', 22', 34'; T. Grambusch 39'; Hüttermann 62'	Report	Kisialevich 44'

Stade de la reu Henri Delescaux, Lille
Umpires:
Warren McCully (IRL)
Andres Ortiz (ESP)

26 October 2013
12:00

Kampong (Netherlands)	14–0	(Belarus) Stroitel Brest
Jonker 3', 11', 42', 43', 52'; Weusthof 10', 39'; Meulenbroek 17'; Havenga 22'; Brinkman 30', 51'; Kemperman 45', 59'; Caspers 62'	Report

Stade de la reu Henri Delescaux, Lille
Umpires:
Andres Ortiz (ESP)
Vincent Clause (BEL)

27 October 2013
12:00

Rot-Weiss Köln (Germany)	2–4	(Netherlands) Kampong
Hütterman 61'; Montag 63'	Report	Caspers 3'; Weusthof 26', 36'; Kemperman 40'

Stade de la reu Henri Delescaux, Lille
Umpires:
Andrew Kennedy (ENG)
Vincent Clause (BEL)

=== Pool C ===
Pos	Team	Pld	W	D	L	GF	GA	GD	Pts	Qualification
1	(Belgium) Waterloo Ducks	2	2	0	0	6	2	+4	10	Advance to knockout stage
2	(Germany) Uhlenhorst Mülheim	2	1	0	1	4	3	+1	6	Advance to knockout stage
3	(Poland) Politechnika Poznanska	2	0	0	2	1	6	−5	1	

Source: EHF

25 October 2013
09:30

Waterloo Ducks (Belgium)	3–1	(Poland) Politechnika Poznanska
Bertrand 41'; De Paeuw 45'; De Saedeleer 61'	Report	Kmiec 7'

Stade de la reu Henri Delescaux, Lille
Umpires:
Bart de Liefde (NED)
Benjamin Mauss (FRA)

26 October 2013
09:30

Uhlenhorst Mülheim (Germany)	3–0	(Poland) Politechnika Poznanska
Stralkowski 23', 61'; Matania 53'	Report

Stade de la reu Henri Delescaux, Lille
Umpires:
Andrew Kennedy (ENG)
Benjamin Mauss (FRA)

27 October 2013
09:30

Waterloo Ducks (Belgium)	3–1	(Germany) Uhlenhorst Mülheim
De Saedeleer 8'; Boccard 39'; Dohmen 43'	Report	Matania 60'

Stade de la reu Henri Delescaux, Lille
Umpires:
Andres Ortiz (ESP)
Warren McCully (IRL)

=== Pool D ===
Pos	Team	Pld	W	D	L	GF	GA	GD	Pts	Qualification
1	(Germany) Harvestehuder THC	2	2	0	0	12	3	+9	10	Advance to knockout stage
2	(England) Beeston	2	1	0	1	5	4	+1	6	Advance to knockout stage
3	(Wales) Cardiff & Met	2	0	0	2	2	12	−10	1	

Source: EHF

11 October 2013
12:00

Beeston (England)	3–1	(Wales) Cardiff & Met
Ward 33', 69'; Blackwell 34'	Report	Dolan-Gray 66'

Pau Negre Stadium, Barcelona
Umpires:
Thomas Lingg (SUI)
Michiel Otten (NED)

12 October 2013
09:00

Harvestehuder THC (Germany)	9–1	(Wales) Cardiff & Met
Joh. Björkman 5', 70'; Körper 18'; Borchard 21'; Fuhrmann 43'; Spooner 51'; Linsmeier 53'; Feller 57'; Pongs 66'	Report	Tomos 30'

Pau Negre Stadium, Barcelona
Umpires:
Colin Hutchinson (IRL)
Georgios Makris (GRE)

13 October 2013
09:30

Beeston (England)	2–3	(Germany) Harvestehuder THC
Proctor 4'; Whiteman 9'	Report	Körper 25', 29'; Linsmeier 27'

Pau Negre Stadium, Barcelona
Umpires:
Francisco Vazquez Lopez (ESP)
Geoffroy van Elegem (BEL)

=== Pool E ===
Pos	Team	Pld	W	D	L	GF	GA	GD	Pts	Qualification
1	(Spain) Real Club de Polo	2	2	0	0	6	1	+5	10	Advance to knockout stage
2	(England) Surbiton	2	1	0	1	5	3	+2	5	Advance to knockout stage
3	(Austria) Arminen	2	0	0	2	1	8	−7	1	

Source: EHF

11 October 2013
09:30

Surbiton (England)	5–0	(Austria) Arminen
Daly 22'; Forsyth 48', 68'; Watt 60'; Tindall 62'	Report

Pau Negre Stadium, Barcelona
Umpires:
Francisco Vazquez Lopez (ESP)
Georgios Makris (GRE)

12 October 2013
12:00

Real Club de Polo (Spain)	3–1	(Austria) Arminen
Padrós 3', 16'; Llorens 63'	Report	Rachwalski 11'

Pau Negre Stadium, Barcelona
Umpires:
Geoffroy van Elegem (BEL)
Moritz Meissner (GER)

13 October 2013
12:00

Real Club de Polo (Spain)	3–0	(England) Surbiton
Llorens 20'; Padrós 29', 39'	Report

Pau Negre Stadium, Barcelona
Umpires:
Colin Hutchinson (IRL)
Michiel Otten (NED)

=== Pool F ===
Pos	Team	Pld	W	D	L	GF	GA	GD	Pts	Qualification
1	(Spain) Club de Campo	2	1	1	0	3	2	+1	7	Advance to knockout stage
2	(Belgium) Dragons	2	1	0	1	4	2	+2	6	Advance to knockout stage
3	(Russia) Dinamo Kazan	2	0	1	1	1	4	−3	2	

Source: EHF

11 October 2013
17:00

Dinamo Kazan (Russia)	1–1	(Spain) Club de Campo
O.G. 61'	Report	O.G. 15'

Pau Negre Stadium, Barcelona
Umpires:
Colin Hutchinson (IRL)
Moritz Meissner (GER)

12 October 2013
17:00

Dragons (Belgium)	1–2	(Spain) Club de Campo
Luypaert 64'	Report	González 20'; Borrell 59'

Pau Negre Stadium, Barcelona
Umpires:
Michiel Otten (NED)
Paul Walker (ENG)

13 October 2013
17:00

Dinamo Kazan (Russia)	0–3	(Belgium) Dragons
	Report	Iglesias 26'; Luypaert 32'; Rombouts 62'

Pau Negre Stadium, Barcelona
Umpires:
Vicenzo Antonio Ilgrande (ITA)
Thomas Lingg (SUI)

=== Pool G ===
Pos	Team	Pld	W	D	L	GF	GA	GD	Pts	Qualification
1	(Netherlands) Oranje Zwart	2	2	0	0	10	1	+9	10	Advance to knockout stage
2	(Poland) Grunwald Poznań	2	1	0	1	5	5	0	5	Advance to knockout stage
3	(Scotland) Kelburne	2	0	0	2	1	10	−9	0	

Source: EHF

11 October 2013
14:30

Oranje Zwart (Netherlands)	6–0	(Scotland) Kelburne
Galema 7'; Van der Weerden 22', 51', 59'; Dabanch 40'; Briels 56'	Report

Pau Negre Stadium, Barcelona
Umpires:
Geoffroy van Elegem (BEL)
Paul Walker (ENG)

12 October 2013
14:30

Grunwald Poznań (Poland)	1–4	(Netherlands) Oranje Zwart
Dutkiewicz 56'	Report	Briels 10'; Dabanch 50'; Reckers 54'; De Voogd 68'

Pau Negre Stadium, Barcelona
Umpires:
Vicenzo Antonio Ilgrande (ITA)
Francisco Vazquez Lopez (ESP)

13 October 2013
14:30

Grunwald Poznań (Poland)	4–1	(Scotland) Kelburne
Mikula 8', 57', 64'; Dutkiewicz 65'	Report	J. Christie 51'

Pau Negre Stadium, Barcelona
Umpires:
Moritz Meissner (GER)
Paul Walker (ENG)

=== Pool H ===
Pos	Team	Pld	W	D	L	GF	GA	GD	Pts	Qualification
1	(Belgium) Racing Club de Bruxelles	2	2	0	0	9	3	+6	10	Advance to knockout stage
2	(France) Saint Germain	2	0	1	1	4	6	−2	3	Advance to knockout stage
3	(Russia) Dinamo Elektrostal	2	0	1	1	5	9	−4	2	

Source: EHF

25 October 2013
14:30

Saint Germain (France)	3–3	(Russia) Dinamo Elektrostal
Deront 17'; P. L. Verrier 34'; C. Verrier 68'	Report	A. Kuraev 6'; Platonov 48'; Azarov 56'

Stade de la reu Henri Delescaux, Lille
Umpires:
Ben Goentgen (GER)
Vincent Clause (BEL)

26 October 2013
17:00

Racing Club de Bruxelles (Belgium)	6–2	(Russia) Dinamo Elektrostal
Tupper 20', 28'; Cornillie 22'; Dabin 33'; Panesar 46'; Beckers 53'	Report	Platonov 9'; Azarov 69'

Stade de la reu Henri Delescaux, Lille
Umpires:
Bart de Liefde (NED)
Oliver Tarnoczi (AUT)

27 October 2013
14:30

Saint Germain (France)	1–3	(Belgium) Racing Club de Bruxelles
Genestet 9'	Report	Charlier 1'; Tupper 9'; Versluys 53'

Stade de la reu Henri Delescaux, Lille
Umpires:
Ben Goentgen (GER)
Oliver Tarnoczi (AUT)

== Knockout stage ==
The knockout stage was played in Eindhoven, Netherlands from 16 to 21 April 2014.

=== Bracket ===
Round of 16
16 April
(Spain) Club de Campo	5
(France) Saint Germain	0
16 April
(Germany) Harvestehuder THC	1
(Germany) Uhlenhorst Mülheim	0
17 April
(Belgium) Waterloo Ducks	4
(England) Beeston	3
17 April
(Belgium) Racing Club de Bruxelles (s.o.)	2 (3)
(Germany) Rot-Weiss Köln	2 (2)
16 April
(Netherlands) Rotterdam	6
(Poland) Grunwald Poznań	1
16 April
(Netherlands) Kampong	2 (3)
(Belgium) Dragons (s.o.)	2 (4)
17 April
(Netherlands) Oranje Zwart	3
(England) Surbiton	1
17 April
(Spain) Real Club de Polo	4
(England) Reading	2

Quarter-finals
18 April
(Spain) Club de Campo	1
(Germany) Harvestehuder THC	4
18 April
(Belgium) Waterloo Ducks	2
(Belgium) Racing Club de Bruxelles	4
18 April
(Netherlands) Rotterdam	0
(Belgium) Dragons	1
18 April
(Netherlands) Oranje Zwart (s.o.)	0 (3)
(Spain) Real Club de Polo	0 (1)

Semi-finals
20 April
(Germany) Harvestehuder THC	3
(Belgium) Racing Club de Bruxelles	2
20 April
(Belgium) Dragons	0
(Netherlands) Oranje Zwart	3

Final
21 April
(Germany) Harvestehuder THC (s.o.)	2 (3)
(Netherlands) Oranje Zwart	2 (1)
Bronze medal match
21 April
(Belgium) Racing Club de Bruxelles	1
(Belgium) Dragons	2

=== Round of 16 ===
16 April 2024
11:30

Club de Campo (Spain)	5–0	(France) Saint Germain
Boeckel 17'; Vila 22', 50'; Dávila 55', 67'	Report

Umpires:
Marcin Grochal (POL)
Roel van Eert (NED)

16 April 2024
14:00

Harvestehuder THC (Germany)	1–0	(Germany) Uhlenhorst Mülheim
Pongs 33'	Report

Umpires:
Hamish Jamson (ENG)
Francisco Vazquez Lopez (ESP)

16 April 2024
16:30

Rotterdam (Netherlands)	6–1	(Poland) Grunwald Poznań
Hertzberger 5', 12', 69'; Van Ass 14'; Thys 59'; Campbell 69'	Report	Majchrzak 50'

Umpires:
Nathan Stagno (GIB)
Sebastien Duterme (BEL)

16 April 2024
19:00

Kampong (Netherlands)	2–2	(Belgium) Dragons
Brinkman 13'; Kemperman 32'	Report	Cobbaert 20'; Saeys 40'
Penalties
Caspers (penalty shoot-out scored); Docherty (penalty shoot-out missed); De Wijn (penalty shoot-out missed); Kemperman (penalty shoot-out scored); Bouwens (penalty shoot-out scored)	3–4	(penalty shoot-out missed) Cobbaert; (penalty shoot-out scored) Van Aubel; (penalty shoot-out scored) Luypaert; (penalty shoot-out scored) Van Doren; (penalty shoot-out scored) Denayer

Umpires:
Martin Madden (SCO)
Jakub Mejzlik (CZE)

17 April 2024
11:30

Real Club de Polo (Spain)	4–2	(England) Reading
Padrós 3'; D. Alegre 26'; Terraza 34'; Lleonart 69'	Report	Watts 49'; Catlin 64'

Umpires:
Marcin Grochal (POL)
Martin Madden (SCO)

17 April 2024
14:00

Racing Club de Bruxelles (Belgium)	2–2	(Germany) Rot-Weiss Köln
Versluys 26'; Vanneste 35'	Report	Miltkau 35', 42'
Penalties
De Mot (penalty shoot-out missed); Truyens (penalty shoot-out scored); Charlier (penalty shoot-out missed); Rickli (penalty shoot-out scored); Beckers (penalty shoot-out scored)	3–2	(penalty shoot-out missed) M. Grambusch; (penalty shoot-out scored) Müller; (penalty shoot-out scored) Miltkau; (penalty shoot-out missed) Trompertz; (penalty shoot-out missed) Delarber

Umpires:
Hamish Jamson (ENG)
Jakub Mejzlik (CZE)

17 April 2024
16:30

Waterloo Ducks (Belgium)	4–3	(England) Beeston
Vandiest 34', 43'; De Paeuw 60'; Jacob 64'	Report	Ward 1', 66', 69'

Umpires:
Nathan Stagno (GIB)
Francisco Vazquez Lopez (ESP)

17 April 2024
19:00

Oranje Zwart (Netherlands)	3–1	(England) Surbiton
Dabanch 2'; Reckers 46'; Van der Weerden 59'	Report	Moore 17'

Umpires:
Christian Blasch (GER)
Sebastien Duterme (BEL)

=== Quarter-finals ===
18 April 2024
11:30

Club de Campo (Spain)	1–4	(Germany) Harvestehuder THC
Mulder 65'	Report	Joh. Björkman 14', 64'; Brockmann 67'; Körper 69'

Umpires:
Martin Madden (SCO)
Sebastien Duterme (BEL)

18 April 2024
14:00

Waterloo Ducks (Belgium)	2–4	(Belgium) Racing Club de Bruxelles
De Saedeleer 30', 32'	Report	Dalla Palma 3'; Versluys 40'; Tupper 43'; Charlier 68'

Umpires:
Roel van Eert (NED)
Christian Blasch (GER)

18 April 2024
16:30

Rotterdam (Netherlands)	0–1	(Belgium) Dragons
	Report	Denayer 29'

Umpires:
Nathan Stagno (GIB)
Francisco Vazquez Lopez (ESP)

18 April 2024
19:00

Oranje Zwart (Netherlands)	0–0	(Spain) Real Club de Polo
	Report
Penalties
Dabanch (penalty shoot-out missed); Rizwan (penalty shoot-out missed); Galema (penalty shoot-out scored); Baart (penalty shoot-out scored); De Voogd (penalty shoot-out scored)	3–1	(penalty shoot-out missed) Padrós; (penalty shoot-out scored) D. Alegre; (penalty shoot-out missed) Lleonart; (penalty shoot-out missed) Rey

Umpires:
Marcin Grochal (POL)
Hamish Jamson (ENG)

=== Semi-finals ===
20 April 2014
11:00

Harvestehuder THC (Germany)	3–2	(Belgium) Racing Club de Bruxelles
Hauke 7'; Hasun 55'; Körper 64'	Report	Beckers 7', 35'

Umpires:
Roel van Eert (NED)
Marcin Grochal (POL)

20 April 2014
14:00

Dragons (Belgium)	0–3	(Netherlands) Oranje Zwart
	Report	Galema 35'; Van der Weerden 41'; Dabanch 53'

Umpires:
Christian Blasch (GER)
Martin Madden (SCO)

=== Bronze medal match ===
21 April 2014
12:00

Racing Club de Bruxelles (Belgium)	1–2	(Belgium) Dragons
Rickli 20'	Report	Van Aubel 16', 68'

Umpires:
Jakub Mejzlik (CZE)
Paco Vazquez (ESP)

=== Final ===
21 April 2014
14:30

Harvestehuder THC (Germany)	2–2	(Netherlands) Oranje Zwart
Spooner 42'; Körper 53'	Report	Van der Weerden 35'; Reckers 50'
Penalties
Hauke (penalty shoot-out missed); Pongs (penalty shoot-out missed); Stanzl (penalty shoot-out scored); Körper (penalty shoot-out scored)	3–1	(penalty shoot-out missed) Dabanch; (penalty shoot-out missed) Van der Horst; (penalty shoot-out scored) Galema; (penalty shoot-out missed) Baart

Umpires:
Hamish Jamson (ENG)
Nathan Stagno (GIB)

== Top goalscorers ==
Rank	Player	Team	FG	PC	PS	Goals
1	(Austria) Michael Körper	(Germany) Harvestehuder THC	2	4	0	6
1	(Netherlands) Mink van der Weerden	(Netherlands) Oranje Zwart	0	6	0	6
3	(Netherlands) Constantijn Jonker	(Netherlands) Kampong	5	0	0	5
3	(England) Sam Ward	(England) Beeston	4	1	0	5
3	(Spain) Roger Padrós	(Spain) Real Club de Polo	2	1	2	5
6	(Sweden) Johan Björkman	(Germany) Harvestehuder THC	4	0	0	4
6	(Netherlands) Robbert Kemperman	(Netherlands) Kampong	4	0	0	4
6	(Spain) Gabriel Dabanch	(Netherlands) Oranje Zwart	4	0	0	4
6	(Netherlands) Jeroen Hertzberger	(Netherlands) Rotterdam	2	2	0	4
6	(Netherlands) Roderick Weusthof	(Netherlands) Kampong	1	3	0	4
6	(Canada) Scott Tupper	(Belgium) Racing Club de Bruxelles	0	4	0	4
6	(Germany) Jan-Marco Montag	(Germany) Rot-Weiss Köln	0	4	0	4
6	(Belgium) Alexandre De Saedeleer	(Belgium) Waterloo Ducks	0	2	2	4
