= Joep de Mol =

Dutch field hockey player

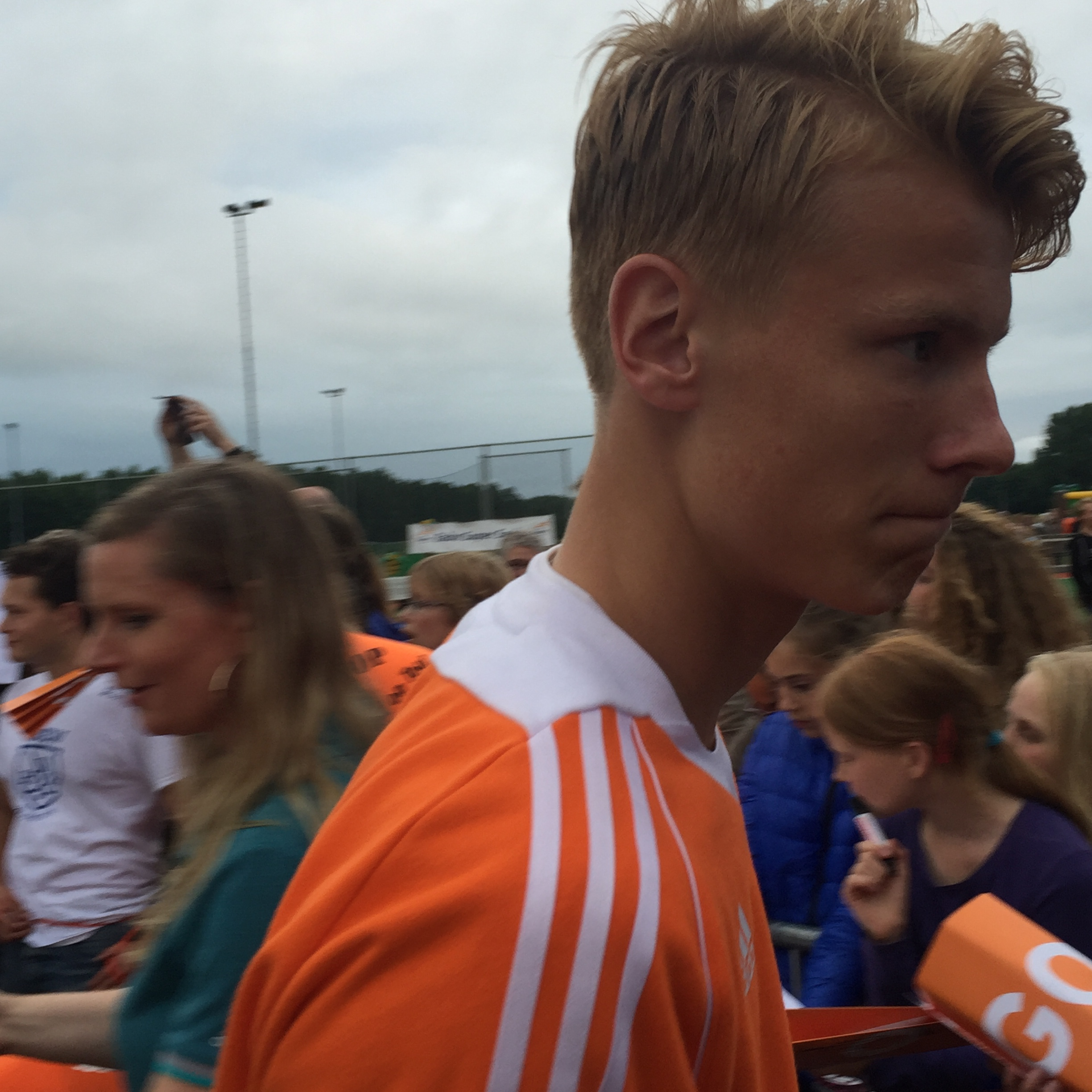
- De Mol in 2016

Personal information
- Full name: Joep Paul Eric de Mol
- Born: 10 December 1995 (age 30) Berkel-Enschot, Netherlands

Sport
- Sport: Field hockey
- Position: Defender
- Club: Oranje-Rood
Youth career
- Team
- –: Berkel Enschot
- –2011: Tilburg
Senior career
Years	Team	Caps	Goals
2011–2014	Push	-	-
2014–2016	Oranje Zwart	-	-
2016–present	Oranje-Rood	-	-
National team
Years	Team	Caps	Goals
2015–2016	Netherlands U21	11	(1)
2015–present	Netherlands	87	(0)
Medal record
Men's field hockey
Representing the Netherlands
Olympic Games
Gold medal – first place	2024 Paris	Team
World Cup
Silver medal – second place	2018 Bhubaneswar
EuroHockey Championship
Gold medal – first place	2017 Amstelveen
Gold medal – first place	2021 Amstelveen
Gold medal – first place	2023 Mönchengladbach
Silver medal – second place	2025 Mönchengladbach
Bronze medal – third place	2019 Antwerp
FIH Pro League
Bronze medal – third place	2019 Amstelveen
Champions Trophy
Bronze medal – third place	2018 Breda

Joep Paul Eric de Mol (Dutch pronunciation: [ˈjub də ˈmɔl]; born 10 December 1995) is a Dutch field hockey player who plays as a defender for Oranje-Rood and the Dutch national team.

== Club career ==
De Mol started playing hockey at his local club in Berkel-Enschot and he also played in the youth ranks of HC Tilburg. He then played three years for Push in Breda. In 2014 he made the switch to Oranje Zwart. After Oranje Zwart merged in 2016 with EMHC he started playing for the newly formed club Oranje-Rood.

== International career ==
De Mol made his debut for the senior national team at the 2015 Hockey World League Final when he replaced the injured Sander Baart. He was named as a reserve for the 2018 World Cup. He was called up during the knockout stage to replace the injured Sander de Wijn. In June 2019, he was selected in the Netherlands squad for the 2019 EuroHockey Championship. They won the bronze medal by defeating Germany 4–0.
