= Elliot Van Strydonck =

Belgian field hockey player

Personal information
- Full name: Elliot Ann Philippe Van Strydonck
- Born: 21 July 1988 (age 38) Uccle, Belgium

Sport
- Sport: Field hockey
- Position: Defender
- Club: Racing
Youth career
- Team
- –: Léopold
Senior career
Years	Team	Caps	Goals
–2013	Léopold	-	-
2013–2015	Oranje Zwart	-	-
2015–2017	Léopold	-	-
2017–2022	Waterloo Ducks	-	-
2022–2025	Léopold	-	-
2025–present	Racing	-	-
National team
Years	Team	Caps	Goals
2007–2016	Belgium	172	-
Medal record
Men's field hockey
Representing Belgium
Olympic Games
Silver medal – second place	2016 Rio de Janeiro	Team
EuroHockey Championship
Silver medal – second place	2013 Boom

Elliot Ann Philippe Van Strydonck (born 21 July 1988) is a Belgian field hockey player who plays as a defender for Racing Club de Bruxelles. He played a total of 182 matches for the Belgium national team from 2007 to 2016.

Van Strydonck became European vice-champion with Belgium at the 2013 European Championship on home ground in Boom.

== Club career ==
Van Strydonck started playing hockey for Léopold. He confirmed in 2013 that he would stop playing for Royal Leopold Club in Uccle, Belgium and make the transfer to the Dutch club Oranje Zwart in Eindhoven. He won the Dutch national title as well as the Men's Euro Hockey League with Oranje Zwart. In 2015 he returned to Léopold. After two season he signed for the Waterloo Ducks. He also won the Euro Hockey League with the Waterloo Ducks in 2018–19. In 2022, he returned to Léopold. He left Léopold in 2025 to play for Racing Club de Bruxelles.

== Honours ==
Oranje Zwart

- Hoofdklasse: 2013–14, 2014–15
- Euro Hockey League: 2014–15

Waterloo Ducks

- Euro Hockey League: 2018–19

Belgium

- Summer Olympics silver medal: 2016
