= Robert van der Horst =

Dutch field hockey player (born 1984)

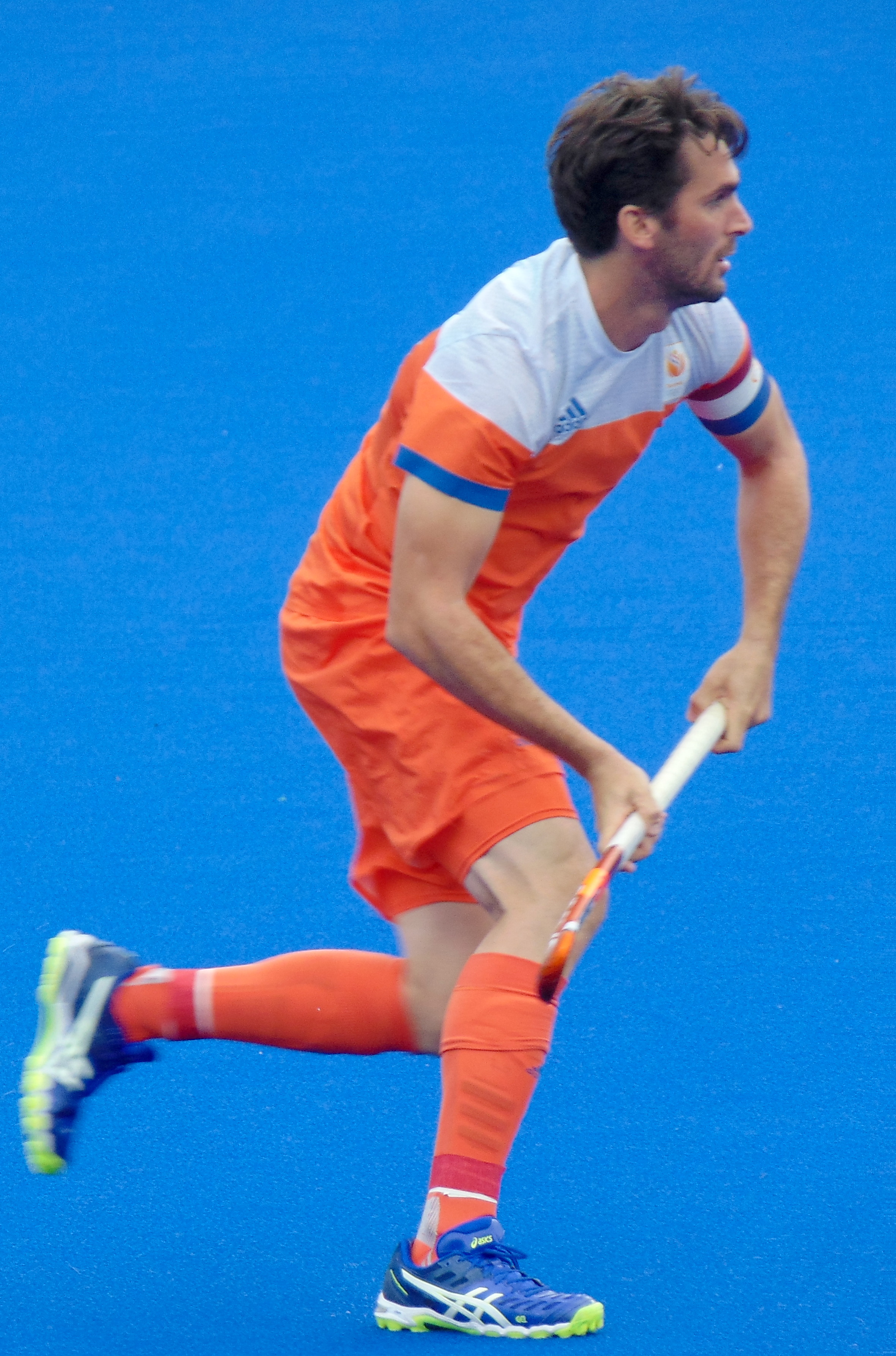
- Van der Horst at the 2016 Olympics

Personal information
- Full name: Robert Adriaan van der Horst
- Born: 17 October 1984 (age 41) Eindhoven, Netherlands
- Height: 179 cm (5 ft 10 1/2 in)
- Weight: 74 kg (163 lb)

Sport
- Sport: Field hockey
- Position: Defender / Midfielder
- Club: England (assistant)
Youth career
- Years: Team
- 1999–2001: Oranje Zwart
Senior career
Years	Team	Caps	Goals
2001–2009	Oranje Zwart	-	-
2009–2012	Rotterdam	-	-
2012–2016	Oranje Zwart	-	-
2016–2019	Oranje-Rood	-	-
National team
Years	Team	Caps	Goals
2004–2016	Netherlands	272	(14)
Coaching career
- 2019–2022: Oranje-Rood
- 2022–2025: Oranje-Rood (assistant)
- 2025–present: England (assistant)
Medal record
Men's field hockey
Representing the Netherlands
Olympic Games
Silver medal – second place	2012 London	Team
World Cup
Silver medal – second place	2014 The Hague
Bronze medal – third place	2010 New Delhi
EuroHockey Championship
Gold medal – first place	2007 Manchester
Gold medal – first place	2015 London
Silver medal – second place	2005 Leipzig
Silver medal – second place	2011 Gladbach
Bronze medal – third place	2009 Amstelveen
Bronze medal – third place	2013 Boom
Champions Trophy
Gold medal – first place	2006 Terrassa
Silver medal – second place	2004 Lahore
Silver medal – second place	2005 Chennai
Bronze medal – third place	2007 Kuala Lumpur
Bronze medal – third place	2010 Mönchengladbach
Bronze medal – third place	2011 Auckland
Hockey World League
Gold medal – first place	2012–13 New Delhi	Team

Robert Adriaan van der Horst (Dutch pronunciation: [ˈrɔbərt fɑn dər ˈɦɔrst]; born 17 October 1984) is a Dutch former field hockey player who played as a defender or midfielder and currently the assistant coach of the England men's national team.

He played a total of 272 caps for the Dutch national team, which makes him the seventh most capped Dutch player of all time. He scored 14 goals in his international career which lasted from 2004 until 2016. The defender was the captain of the national teams that finished fourth at the 2008 and 2016 Olympics and won a silver medal in 2012. He played club hockey for Oranje Zwart, Rotterdam and Oranje-Rood.

== Club career ==
He played in the youth ranks of Oranje Zwart for two years before he got into the first team, in which he played for eight seasons. After those eight seasons, he joined HC Rotterdam. He wanted to leave Oranje Zwart after those eight seasons because he felt that he had so much responsibility for his team and club that it was at the expense of his own development as a hockey player. After three seasons with Rotterdam, he returned to Oranje Zwart. After Oranje Zwart merged in 2016 with EMHC he started playing for the newly formed club HC Oranje-Rood. In April 2019 van der Horst announced he would retire at the end of the season.

== International career ==
He made his debut for the Dutch national team during the 2004 Champions Trophy in Lahore. He was named the 2005 Young Player of the Year and the 2015 Player of the Year by the International Hockey Federation, which also placed him on the 2007 All-Star team. He was selected as player of the tournament at the 2007 EuroHockey Nations Championship. During his long international career, he played in three Summer Olympics, three World Cups and six EuroHockey Championships. In 2016, the head coach of the national team announced he would no longer be called up, so the 2016 Summer Olympics was his last tournament with the national team.

== Coaching career ==
After van der Horst announced his retirement as a player it was announced that he would become the new head coach of his former club's first men's team Oranje-Rood. After three years as the head coach, he took a step back and switched roles with the assistant coach. After six years he stepped down as assistant coach at Oranje-Rood. He joined the England men's national team as an assistant coach, with the first tournament being the 2025 Men's EuroHockey Championship.

== Personal life ==
He was born and raised in Eindhoven, where he currently still lives. He is married and has two children.

== Honours ==
=== Club ===
Oranje Zwart

- Hoofdklasse: 2004–05, 2013–14, 2014–15, 2015–16
- Euro Hockey League: 2014–15

=== International ===
Netherlands

- Summer Olympics silver medal: 2012
- EuroHockey Championships: 2007, 2015
- Champions Trophy: 2006
- Hockey World League: 2012–13

=== Individual ===
- FIH WorldHockey Young Player of the Year: 2005
- FIH Player of the Year: 2015
- Best hockey player in the Netherlands: 2005, 2011, 2012

Preceded by Santi Freixa	WorldHockey Young Player of the Year; 2005	Succeeded by Christopher Zeller
Preceded by Mark Knowles	FIH Player of the Year; 2015	Succeeded by John-John Dohmen
