= Thomas Briels =

Belgian field hockey player

Personal information
- Born: 23 August 1987 (age 38) Wilrijk, Belgium
- Height: 1.72 m (5 ft 8 in)
- Weight: 71 kg (157 lb)

Sport
- Sport: Field hockey
- Position: Forward
- Club: Braxgata
Youth career
- Team
- –: Dragons
Senior career
Years	Team	Caps	Goals
–2008	Dragons	-	-
2008–2015	Oranje Zwart	-	-
2015–2017	Dragons	-	-
2018–2023	Oranje-Rood	-	-
2023–present	Braxgata	-	-
National team
Years	Team	Caps	Goals
2006–2021	Belgium	359	(40)
Medal record
Men's field hockey
Representing Belgium
Olympic Games
Gold medal – first place	2020 Tokyo	Team
Silver medal – second place	2016 Rio de Janeiro	Team
World Cup
Gold medal – first place	2018 Bhubaneswar
EuroHockey Championship
Gold medal – first place	2019 Antwerp
Silver medal – second place	2013 Boom
Silver medal – second place	2017 Amstelveen
Bronze medal – third place	2007 Manchester
Bronze medal – third place	2021 Amstelveen

Thomas Briels (born 23 August 1987) is a Belgian field hockey player who plays as a forward for Braxgata. He played a total of 359 times for the Belgium national team from 2006 until 2021.

== Club career ==
Briels started playing at Dragons when he was around five years old. In 2008, he signed a contract with the Dutch club Oranje Zwart in Eindhoven. He left Oranje Zwart in 2015 to return to Dragons. He returned to Eindhoven in 2018, when he signed for Oranje-Rood. After 13 combined years at Oranje Zwart and Oranje-Rood, he left Eindhoven to play for Braxgata in Boom, Belgium, where he signed a contract for two years.

== International career ==
Briels plays for the national team, for whom he had gathered 84 caps by 2009. In 2007 he qualified with Belgium for the 2008 Olympic tournament in Beijing where they would end up ninth. At the 2012 Summer Olympics, he competed for the national team in the men's tournament where they eventually finished fifth. With Belgium he became European vice-champion at the 2013 European Championship on home ground in Boom.

At the 2016 Olympics, he was part of the Belgian team which won the silver medal. He was the captain of the Belgian team that won the 2018 World Cup and the 2019 EuroHockey Championship. On 25 May 2021, he was selected as the captain for the squad for the 2021 EuroHockey Championship. After the European Championship he was named as a reserve for the 2020 Summer Olympics. Despite being named as a reserve he still played in seven of the eight games in the tournament where they won Belgium its first Olympic hockey gold. After the Olympics he announced his retirement from international hockey.

== Honours ==
=== Club ===
Oranje Zwart

- Euro Hockey League: 2014–15
- Hoofdklasse: 2013–14, 2014–15

Dragons

- Belgian Hockey League: 2015–16, 2016–17

=== International ===
Belgium

- Olympic gold medal: 2020
- Olympic silver medal: 2016
- World Cup: 2018
- EuroHockey Championship: 2019
- FIH Pro League: 2020–21
