= Bob de Voogd =

Dutch field hockey player (born 1988)

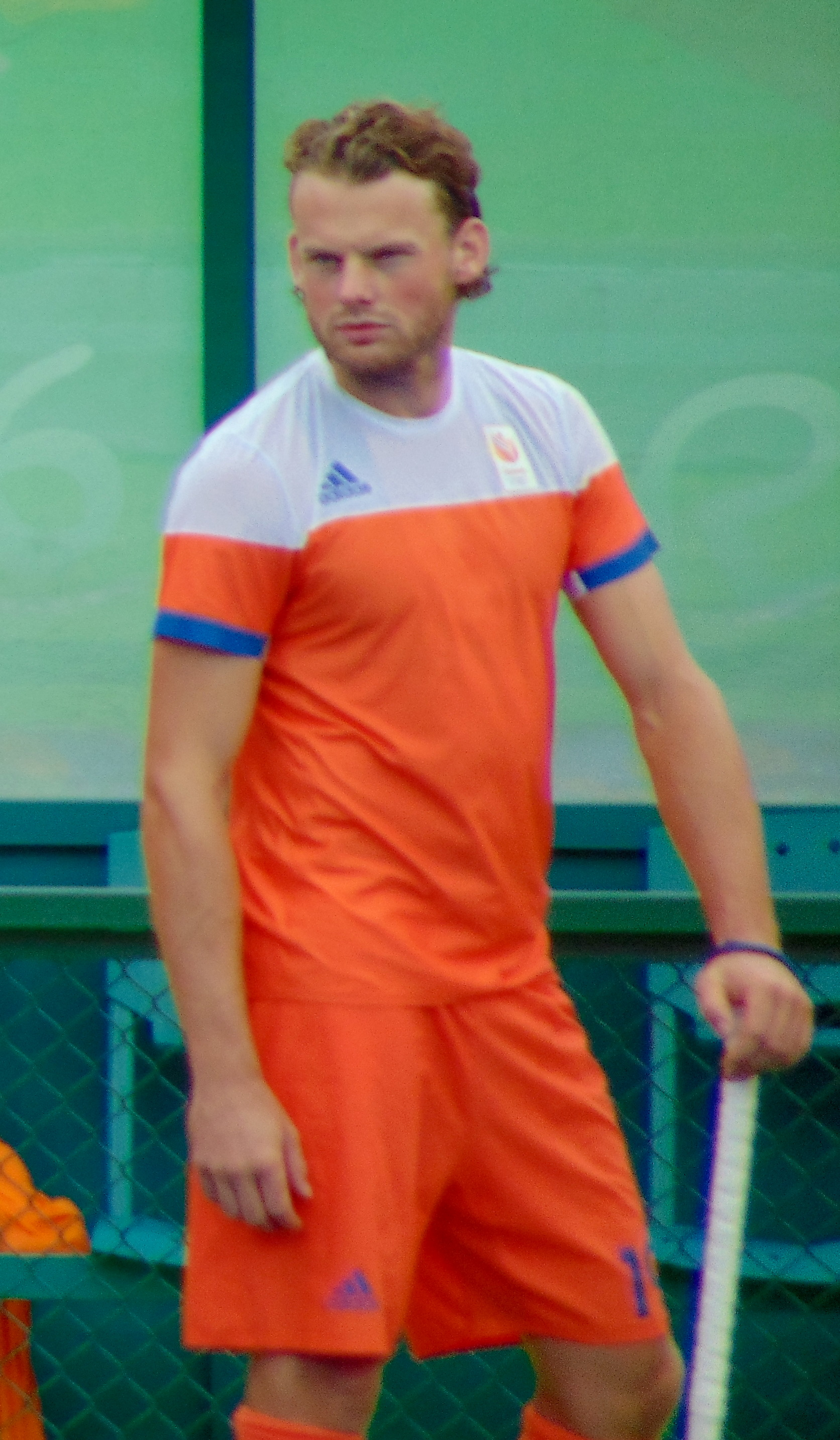
- De Voogd at the 2016 Olympics

Personal information
- Born: 16 September 1988 (age 37) Helmond, Netherlands
- Height: 183 cm (6 ft 0 in)

Sport
- Sport: Field hockey
- Position: Midfielder / Forward
- Club: Oranje-Rood
Youth career
- Years: Team
- –1999: HMHC
- 1999–2003: Helmond
Senior career
Years	Team	Caps	Goals
2003–2004	Helmond	-	-
2004–2007	Den Bosch	-	-
2007–2016	Oranje Zwart	-	-
2016–2019	Oranje-Rood	-	-
2019–2022	Braxgata	-	-
2022–2024	Helmond	-	-
2024–2025	Bra	-	-
2025–present	Oranje-Rood	-	-
National team
Years	Team	Caps	Goals
2009–2020	Netherlands	146	(35)
Medal record
Men's field hockey
Representing the Netherlands
Olympic Games
Silver medal – second place	2012 London	Team
World Cup
Silver medal – second place	2018 Bhubaneswar
EuroHockey Championship
Gold medal – first place	2015 London
Gold medal – first place	2017 Amstelveen
Silver medal – second place	2011 Mönchengladbach
Champions Trophy
Bronze medal – third place	2011 Auckland
Silver medal – second place	2012 Melbourne
Bronze medal – third place	2018 Breda
Hockey World League
Gold medal – first place	2012–13 New Delhi	Team

Bob de Voogd (Dutch pronunciation: [ˈbɔb də ˈvoːxt]; born 16 September 1988) is a Dutch field hockey player who plays as a midfielder or forward for Hoofdklasse club Oranje-Rood.

He was included to the national team in 2009 and won a silver medal at the 2012 Olympics, placing fourth in 2016.

== Club career ==
De Voogd started playing hockey at his local hockey club HMHC in Helmond. After the club merged with another Helmond club he started playing for the newly formed club, HC Helmond. He played there until 2004 when he transferred to Den Bosch to play in the highest division of Dutch field hockey. In 2007, he transferred to Oranje Zwart. After Oranje Zwart merged in 2016 with EMHC he started playing for the newly formed club HC Oranje-Rood. In January 2019, he agreed to play for Braxgata in Belgium from the 2019–20 season onwards.

After three seasons in Belgium he returned to the Netherlands to play for his boyhood club Helmond in the Dutch fourth tier. He won the Silver Cup with Helmond in his first season back. After two seasons at his old club, he announced his retirement from hockey in May 2024. He came out of retirement immediately to play one season for the Italian club Bra. After his period in Italy he returned to the Netherlands to play at the highest level again for Oranje-Rood.

== International career ==
De Voogd broke his jaw during a friendly match against Pakistan in June 2012, but recovered for the 2012 Olympics. Next year he missed four months of competitions, including the European Championships, because of a foot injury. He was not selected for the 2014 World Championships. However, he did play in the 2018 World Cup, where they won the silver medal. In January 2020, he was dropped from the national team's training squad for the 2020 Summer Olympics.

== Honours ==
Netherlands

- Summer Olympics silver medal: 2012
- European Championship: 2015, 2017
- Hockey World League: 2012–13

Oranje Zwart

- Euro Hockey League: 2014–15
- Hoofdklasse: 2013–14, 2014–15, 2015–16

Helmond

- Silver Cup: 2022–23
