= EMHC =

EMHC may refer to:

- Eindhovense Mixed Hockey Club, Dutch field hockey club
- Extraordinary minister of Holy Communion, minister of the Catholic Church
- East Midlands Hardcore, Hardcore punk scene in UK
