= Sander Baart =

Dutch field hockey player (born 1988)

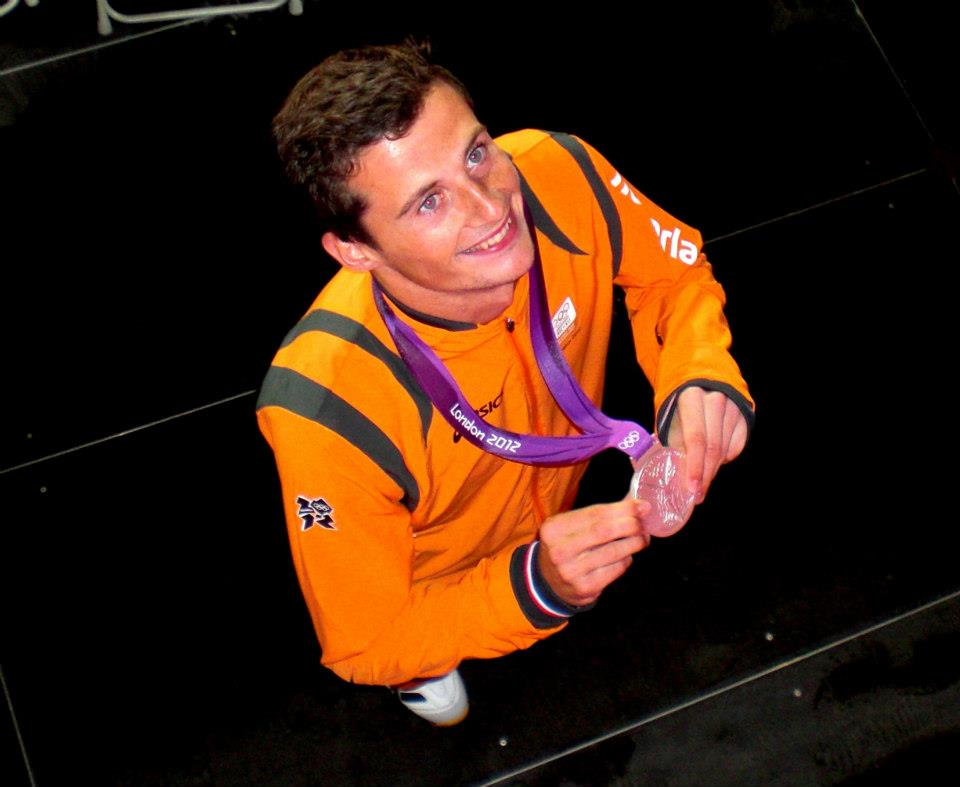
- Baart with the silver medal at the 2012 Summer Olympics

Personal information
- Full name: Alexander Baart
- Born: 30 April 1988 (age 38) Edegem, Belgium

Sport
- Sport: Field hockey
- Position: Defender / Midfielder
- Club: Antwerp
Youth career
- Years: Team
- 1994–2004: Antwerp
Senior career
Years	Team	Caps	Goals
2004–2007	Antwerp	-	-
2007–2016	Oranje Zwart	-	-
2013–2015	→ Uttar Pradesh Wizards	-	-
2016–2017	Real Club de Polo	-	-
2017	→ Uttar Pradesh Wizards	-	-
2017–2020	Braxgata	-	-
2020–2022	Oranje-Rood	-	-
2022–present	Antwerp	-	-
National team
Years	Team	Caps	Goals
2007–2021	Netherlands	193	(6)
Medal record
Men's field hockey
Representing the Netherlands
Olympic Games
Silver medal – second place	2012 London	Team
World Cup
Silver medal – second place	2014 The Hague
Silver medal – second place	2018 Bhubaneswar
European Championship
Gold medal – first place	2015 London
Gold medal – first place	2017 Amstelveen
Bronze medal – third place	2013 Boom
Bronze medal – third place	2019 Antwerp
Champions Trophy
Silver medal – second place	2012 Melbourne
Bronze medal – third place	2010 Mönchengladbach
Bronze medal – third place	2018 Breda
Hockey World League
Gold medal – first place	2012–13 New Delhi	Team
- Updated on 23 March 2022

Alexander Baart (Dutch pronunciation: [ˈsɑndər ˈbaːrt]; born 30 April 1988) is a Dutch field hockey player of Belgian descent who plays as a defender or midfielder for Belgian club Antwerp.

== Club career ==
He started playing at the age of 6 at Royal Antwerp HC in Belgium and in his final season with them in 2007 won the Belgian national title. As of the 2007–2008 season he was playing for the Dutch club Oranje Zwart. In 2014, 2015 and 2016 he won 3 consecutive Dutch national titles with his club. And in 2015 he also won the Euro Hockey League with his club.

On a club level he also represented the Uttar Pradesh Wizards in the first three seasons of the Hockey India League as well as in 2017. In the European club season of 2017–18, he played for Real Club de Polo de Barcelona. As of the 2017–18 season, he played for Braxgata in the Belgian club competition. In January 2020 it was announced he would return to Eindhoven to play for Oranje Zwart's successor Oranje-Rood in the 2020–21 season. After two seasons back in Eindhoven he returned to Belgium to play for his first club Antwerp.

== International career ==
As a junior player, he played for the Belgian national team Boys Under 16 and won the European title with them. Later on, he switched to the Dutch national teams and won European silver and gold medals for the Dutch under-21 team and the silver medal at the Junior World Championship.

He played his first official match for the senior Dutch national men's team in 2007 against South Korea. He is the only player to be selected for the Dutch national team without ever having played in the Dutch competition prior to his debut. At the 2012 Summer Olympics, he competed for the national team in the men's tournament, winning the silver medal.

With the national team, he won a gold medal in the first Hockey World League in 2014, silver at the World Cup that same year and a gold medal in 2015 at the European Championship. He participated in the Rio Olympics in 2016 where he made the semi-final. In August 2017 he extended his European title in Amsterdam beating his other homeland Belgium in the final. In June 2019, he was selected in the Netherlands squad for the 2019 EuroHockey Championship. They won the bronze medal by defeating Germany 4–0.

== Honours ==
=== International ===
Netherlands

- Olympic Silver Medal: 2012
- EuroHockey Championship: 2015, 2017
- Hockey World League: 2012–13

=== Club ===
Antwerp

- Belgian Hockey League: 2006–07

Oranje Zwart

- Euro Hockey League: 2014–15
- Hoofdklasse: 2013–14, 2014–15, 2015–16

Real Club de Polo

- Copa del Rey: 2017
