= Jelle Galema =

Dutch field hockey player (born 1992)

Personal information
- Born: 16 November 1992 (age 33) Boxtel, Netherlands

Sport
- Sport: Field hockey
- Position: Forward
- Club: Oranje-Rood
Youth career
- Team
- –: MEP
Senior career
Years	Team	Caps	Goals
2009–2016	Oranje Zwart	-	-
2016–2018	Oranje-Rood	-	-
2018–2021	Den Bosch	-	-
2021–present	Oranje-Rood	-	-
National team
Years	Team	Caps	Goals
2013–2022	Netherlands	83	(9)
Medal record
Men's field hockey
Representing the Netherlands
World Cup
Silver medal – second place	2014 The Hague
EuroHockey Championship
Bronze medal – third place	2013 Boom
Bronze medal – third place	2019 Antwerp
Junior World Cup
Bronze medal – third place	2013 New Delhi
- Updated on 20 May 2025

Jelle Galema (born 16 November 1992) is a Dutch field hockey player who plays as a forward for Hoofdklasse club Oranje-Rood. He played a total of 83 matches for the Dutch national team from 2013 to 2022 in which he scored 9 goals.

== Club career ==
Galema started playing hockey at MEP in Boxtel and in 2009 he made the switch to Oranje Zwart. After Oranje Zwart merged in 2016 with EMHC he started playing for the newly formed club Oranje-Rood. In 2018, he moved to Den Bosch. After three seasons in Den Bosch he returned to Oranje-Rood in the summer of 2021.

== International career ==
Galema's first call-up for the national team was for the 2012–13 Hockey World League Semifinal in Rotterdam. Galema was a part of the Dutch squad which won a bronze medal at the 2013 European Championship and a silver medal at the 2014 World Cup. After 2017, he was not called up for two years but he returned in the national team for the 2019 FIH Pro League. In June 2019, he was selected in the Netherlands squad for the 2019 EuroHockey Championship. They won the bronze medal by defeating Germany 4–0. In December 2020, he was dropped from the national team's training squad for the 2020 Summer Olympics. After he did not make the selection for the 2023 Men's FIH Hockey World Cup, he announced his retirement from the national team.

== Honours ==
Oranje Zwart

- Hoofdklasse: 2013–14, 2014–15, 2015–16
- Euro Hockey League: 2014–15

Netherlands

- FIH Pro League: 2021–22, 2022–23
