= José Ballbe =

Spanish field hockey player (born 1985)

José Carlos Ballve
Personal information
- Full name: José Carlos Ballvé Sala
- Born: 21 February 1985 (age 41) Terrassa, Barcelona, Spain
- Height: 175 cm (5 ft 9 in)
- Weight: 70 kg (154 lb)

Sport
- Sport: Field hockey

José Carlos Ballvé Sala (born 21 February 1985 in Terrassa) is a Spanish field hockey player. At the 2012 Summer Olympics, he competed for the national team in the men's tournament.
