= 2014–15 Euro Hockey League =

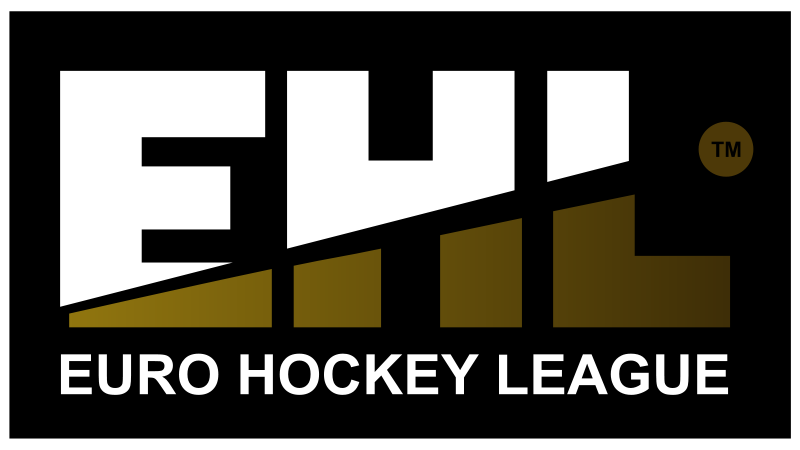

Tournament details
- Host countries: Spain; Netherlands
- Dates: 10 October 2014 – 6 April 2015
- Teams: 24 (from 12 associations)
- Venue: 2 (in 2 host cities)

Final positions
- Champions: (Netherlands) Oranje Zwart (1st title)
- Runner-up: (Germany) UHC Hamburg
- Third place: (Netherlands) Bloemendaal

Tournament statistics
- Matches played: 28
- Goals scored: 133 (4.75 per match)
- Top scorer: Tom Boon (Bloemendaal) (10 goals)

The 2014–15 Euro Hockey League was the eighth season of the Euro Hockey League, Europe's premier club field hockey tournament organized by the European Hockey Federation. Round One was held in Barcelona, Spain from 10 to 12 October 2014 and the knockout stage was held in Bloemendaal, Netherlands from 1 to 6 April 2015.

The final was played between UHC Hamburg and Oranje Zwart at HC Bloemendaal in Bloemendaal, Netherlands. Oranje Zwart beat Hamburg 6–5 in a shoot-out to win their first Euro Hockey League title. Harvestehuder THC were the title holders, but were eliminated by Dragons in the round of 16.

== Round 1 ==
Round one was held from 10 until 12 October 2014 in Barcelona, Spain. In each group, teams played against each other once in a round-robin format. The pool winners advanced to the round of 16. The winning team received 5 points. A draw gave both teams 2 points. A loss gave the losing team 1 point unless they lost by 3 or more goals, in which case they received 0 points.

=== Pool A ===
Pos	Team	Pld	W	D	L	GF	GA	GD	Pts	Qualification
1	(Netherlands) Kampong	2	2	0	0	10	3	+7	10	Advance to knockout stage
2	(England) East Grinstead	2	1	0	1	6	6	0	6	
3	(Russia) Dinamo Stroitel	2	0	0	2	4	11	−7	1	

Source: EHF

10 October 2014
17:30

East Grinstead (England)	4–3	(Russia) Dinamo Stroitel
Gleghorne 13', 39'; Jackson 34'; Faulkner 46'	Report	Siniagin 7'; Fattakhov 14'; Volkov 22'

Umpires:
David Sweetman (SCO)
Pietro Galligani (ITA)

11 October 2014
17:30

Kampong (Netherlands)	3–2	(England) East Grinstead
Kemperman 43'; Havenga 65'; Jonker 70+'	Report	Gleghorne 32', 50'

Umpires:
Geoff Conn (IRL)
Ben Goentgen (GER)

12 October 2014
17:00

Kampong (Netherlands)	7–1	(Russia) Dinamo Stroitel
Luypaert 5', 67'; Jonker 7', 19'; Van de Vijfeijken 10', 30'; Meulenbroek 51'	Report	Plesetckii 69'

Umpires:
Tim Benford (ENG)
Andres Ortiz (ESP)

=== Pool B ===
Pos	Team	Pld	W	D	L	GF	GA	GD	Pts	Qualification
1	(Belgium) Daring	2	2	0	0	6	1	+5	10	Advance to knockout stage
2	Racing Club de France	2	1	0	1	3	4	−1	6	
3	(Ireland) Monkstown	2	0	0	2	1	5	−4	1	

Source: EHF

10 October 2014
15:00

Monkstown (Ireland)	1–2	Racing Club de France
Watkins 54'	Report	Kirkpatrick 14'; S. Martin-Brisac 30'

Umpires:
Andres Ortiz (ESP)
Coen van Bunge (NED)

11 October 2014
15:00

Daring (Belgium)	3–0	(Ireland) Monkstown
T. Cosyns 9'; Wegnez 40'; G. Cosyns 70+'	Report

Umpires:
Grant Hundley (USA)
David Sweetman (SCO)

12 October 2014
14:30

Daring (Belgium)	3–1	Racing Club de France
T. Cosyns 24', 41', 55'	Report	Koch 67'

Umpires:
David Sweetman (SCO)
Pietro Galligani (ITA)

=== Pool C ===
Pos	Team	Pld	W	D	L	GF	GA	GD	Pts	Qualification
1	(Germany) Rot-Weiss Köln	2	2	0	0	14	0	+14	10	Advance to knockout stage
2	(Poland) Grunwald Poznań	2	1	0	1	3	7	−4	5	
3	(Italy) Bra	2	0	0	2	2	12	−10	1	

Source: EHF

10 October 2014
10:00

Bra (Italy)	2–3	(Poland) Grunwald Poznań
Bartholomew 33'; Bhana 39'	Report	Marcinkowski 41'; Mikula 57'; Majchrzak 60'

Umpires:
Geoff Conn (IRL)
Benjamin Mauss (FRA)

11 October 2014
10:00

Rot-Weiss Köln (Germany)	5–0	(Poland) Grunwald Poznań
Zeller 38', 43', 70+'; C. Menke 49'; T. Grambusch 54'	Report

Umpires:
Vincent Clause (BEL)
Andres Ortiz (ESP)

12 October 2014
09:30

Rot-Weiss Köln (Germany)	9–0	(Italy) Bra
Miltkau 3', 40'; M. Grambusch 4', 6'; Weß 9', 27'; Zeller 15'; T. Grambusch 55'; Chorus 57'	Report

Umpires:
Benjamin Mauss (FRA)
Vincent Clause (BEL)

=== Pool D ===
Pos	Team	Pld	W	D	L	GF	GA	GD	Pts	Qualification
1	(Austria) Arminen	2	1	1	0	7	4	+3	7	Advance to knockout stage
2	(Spain) Atlètic Terrassa	2	1	1	0	6	3	+3	7	
3	(Scotland) Kelburne	2	0	0	2	3	9	−6	0	

Source: EHF

10 October 2014
12:30

Kelburne (Scotland)	2–5	(Austria) Arminen
Ralph 6'; Scholefield 56'	Report	A. Bele 2', 23'; Berger 30'; Eitenberger 55'; R. Bele 68'

Umpires:
Ben Goentgen (GER)
Grant Hundley (USA)

11 October 2014
12:30

Atlètic Terrassa (Spain)	2–2	(Austria) Arminen
Roig 45'; Torrente 65'	Report	Pa. Schmidt 10'; A. Bele 14'

Umpires:
Tim Benford (ENG)
Coen van Bunge (NED)

12 October 2014
12:00

Atlètic Terrassa (Spain)	4–1	(Scotland) Kelburne
Freixa 35+', 55'; Guerrero 42'; Di Mercurio 60'	Report	L. Morton 46'

Umpires:
Coen van Bunge (NED)
Grant Hundley (USA)

== Knockout stage ==
The knockout stage was played from 1–6 April 2015, in Bloemendaal, Netherlands.

=== Bracket ===
Round of 16
1 April
(Russia) Dinamo Kazan	0
(Germany) UHC Hamburg	1
2 April
(Belgium) Waterloo Ducks	0
(Netherlands) Kampong	2
2 April
(England) Beeston	2 (2)
(Belgium) Daring (s.o.)	2 (4)
2 April
(Spain) Real Club de Polo	1
(Germany) Rot-Weiss Köln	2
1 April
(Germany) Harvestehuder THC	2
(Belgium) Dragons	6
1 April
(Poland) Pomarzanin	2
(Netherlands) Bloemendaal	14
2 April
(Netherlands) Oranje Zwart	2
(Austria) Arminen	0
1 April
(France) Saint Germain	1 (4)
(Spain) Club Egara (s.o.)	1 (5)

Quarter-finals
4 April
(Germany) UHC Hamburg	3
(Netherlands) Kampong	2
4 April
(Belgium) Daring (s.o.)	2 (5)
(Germany) Rot-Weiss Köln	2 (3)
4 April
(Belgium) Dragons	3
(Netherlands) Bloemendaal	4
4 April
(Netherlands) Oranje Zwart	4
(Spain) Club Egara	1

Semi-finals
5 April
(Germany) UHC Hamburg	2
(Belgium) Daring	0
5 April
(Netherlands) Bloemendaal	2 (4)
(Netherlands) Oranje Zwart (s.o.)	2 (5)

Final
6 April
(Germany) UHC Hamburg	1 (2)
(Netherlands) Oranje Zwart (s.o.)	1 (6)
Bronze medal match
6 April
(Belgium) Daring	0
(Netherlands) Bloemendaal	1

=== Round of 16 ===
1 April 2015
11:00

Saint Germain (France)	1–1	(Spain) Club Egara
Pauchet 50'	Report	Romeu 38'
Penalties
Verrier (penalty shoot-out scored); Harou (penalty shoot-out scored); Goyet (penalty shoot-out scored); Pauchet (penalty shoot-out scored); Samson (penalty shoot-out missed)	4–5	(penalty shoot-out scored) Farrés; (penalty shoot-out scored) Ruiz; (penalty shoot-out scored) Fustagueras; (penalty shoot-out scored) Arbos; (penalty shoot-out scored) De Paeuw

Umpires:
David Sweetman (SCO)
Michiel Otten (NED)

1 April 2015
13:15

Dinamo Kazan (Russia)	0–1	(Germany) UHC Hamburg
	Report	Mieling 25'

Umpires:
Pietro Galligani (ITA)
Hamish Jamson (ENG)

1 April 2015
15:30

Harvestehuder THC (Germany)	2–6	(Belgium) Dragons
Hauke 58'; Körper 62'	Report	Van Aubel 33'; Cabbaert 40', 59'; Good 50', 65'; Thys 69'

Umpires:
Martin Madden (SCO)
Benjamin Mauss (FRA)

1 April 2015
17:45

Pomorzanin (Poland)	2–14	(Netherlands) Bloemendaal
Nowakowski 57'; Kunklewski 60'	Report	Boon 3', 5', 34', 60', 67'; Van Puffelen 8', 38'; Vos 18+'; Gougnard 19', 20'; Bovendeert 31', 39'; Da. Aarts 36'; Do. Aarts 66'

Umpires:
Ben Goentgen (GER)
Dan Barstow (ENG)

2 April 2015
11:00

Real Club de Polo (Spain)	1–2	(Germany) Rot-Weiss Köln
Llorens Purtí 9'	Report	T. Grambusch 17'; M. Grambusch 63'

Umpires:
Hamish Jamson (ENG)
Sebastien Duterme (BEL)

2 April 2015
13:15

Beeston (England)	2–2	(Belgium) Daring
Martin 34', 64'	Report	Van Linthoudt 8'; Alvarez 31'
Penalties
Martin (penalty shoot-out scored); Dixon; Ward (penalty shoot-out scored); Arnold (penalty shoot-out missed)	2–4	(penalty shoot-out scored) Mesa Hernandez; (penalty shoot-out scored) G. Cosyns; (penalty shoot-out scored) Wegnez; (penalty shoot-out missed) Brunet; (penalty shoot-out scored) Enrique

Umpires:
Michiel Otten (NED)
Jakub Mejzlik (CZE)

2 April 2015
15:30

Oranje Zwart (Netherlands)	2–0	(Austria) Arminen
Van der Schoot 17'; Van der Weerden 69'	Report

Umpires:
Pietro Galligani (ITA)
Dan Barstow (ENG)

2 April 2015
17:45

Waterloo Ducks (Belgium)	0–2	(Netherlands) Kampong
	Report	Kemperman 29'; Luypaert 57'

Umpires:
David Sweetman (SCO)
Ben Goentgen (GER)

=== Quarter-finals ===
4 April 2015
10:00

Daring (Belgium)	2–2	(Germany) Rot-Weiss Köln
T. Cosyns 55', 69'	Report	Zeller 3'; M. Grambusch 17'
Penalties
T. Cosyns (penalty shoot-out scored); G. Cosyns (penalty shoot-out scored); Wegnez (penalty shoot-out scored); Brunet (penalty shoot-out scored); Enrique (penalty shoot-out scored)	5–3	(penalty shoot-out missed) Müller; (penalty shoot-out scored) Zeller; (penalty shoot-out scored) Miltkau; (penalty shoot-out scored) M. Grambusch

Umpires:
Dan Barstow (ENG)
David Sweetman (SCO)

4 April 2015
12:45

Oranje Zwart (Netherlands)	4–1	(Spain) Club Egara
Van der Weerden 4', 57', 61'; Galema 69'	Report	De Paeuw 29'

Umpires:
Jakub Mejzlik (CZE)
Martin Madden (SCO)

4 April 2015
14:30

Dragons (Belgium)	3–4	(Netherlands) Bloemendaal
Van Doren 5'; Cobbaert 11'; Van Aubel 48'	Report	Van Puffelen 30'; Boon 56', 63', 64'

Umpires:
Hamish Jamson (ENG)
Ben Göntgen (GER)

4 April 2015
16:45

UHC Hamburg (Germany)	3–2	(Netherlands) Kampong
Fuchs 41', 47'; J. Fürste 66'	Report	Luypaert 25'; Jonker 53'

Umpires:
Sebastien Duterme (BEL)
Benjamin Mauss (FRA)

=== Semi-finals ===
5 April 2015
12:00

UHC Hamburg (Germany)	2–0	(Belgium) Daring
Nevado 56'; J. Fürste 60'	Report

Umpires:
Dan Barstow (ENG)
Hamish Jamson (ENG)

5 April 2015
15:00

Bloemendaal (Netherlands)	2–2	(Netherlands) Oranje Zwart
Schuurman 31'; Boon 69'	Report	Reckers 41'; Galema 44'
Penalties
Gougnard (penalty shoot-out scored); Boon (penalty shoot-out scored); Hofman (penalty shoot-out scored); Schuurman (penalty shoot-out scored); Jolie (penalty shoot-out missed); Gougnard (penalty shoot-out missed); Boon (penalty shoot-out missed)	4–5	(penalty shoot-out scored) De Voogd; (penalty shoot-out missed) Galema; (penalty shoot-out scored) Baart; (penalty shoot-out scored) Reckers; (penalty shoot-out scored) Briels; (penalty shoot-out missed) De Voogd; (penalty shoot-out scored) Briels

Umpires:
Ben Göntgen (GER)
Martin Madden (SCO)

=== Bronze medal match ===
6 April 2015
12:30

Daring (Belgium)	0–1	(Netherlands) Bloemendaal
	Report	Boon 61'

Umpires:
David Sweetman (SCO)
Jakub Mejzlik (CZE)

=== Final ===
6 April 2015
15:00

UHC Hamburg (Germany)	1–1	(Netherlands) Oranje Zwart
Bruns 62'	Report	De Voogd 23'
Penalties
Rabente (penalty shoot-out scored); Korn (penalty shoot-out missed); Fuchs (penalty shoot-out missed); M. Fürste (penalty shoot-out scored); J. Fürste (penalty shoot-out missed); M. Fürste (penalty shoot-out scored); Korn (penalty shoot-out missed); Rabente (penalty shoot-out scored); J. Fürste (penalty shoot-out missed); Fuchs (penalty shoot-out scored); M. Fürste (penalty shoot-out missed)	5–6	(penalty shoot-out scored) De Voogd; (penalty shoot-out missed) Baart; (penalty shoot-out scored) Rizwan; (penalty shoot-out missed) Reckers; (penalty shoot-out missed) Briels; (penalty shoot-out scored) De Voogd; (penalty shoot-out missed) Baart; (penalty shoot-out scored) Rizwan; (penalty shoot-out missed) Briels; (penalty shoot-out scored) Reckers; (penalty shoot-out scored) De Voogd

Umpires:
Hamish Jamson (ENG)
Martin Madden (SCO)

== Top goalscorers ==
Rank	Player	Team	FG	PC	PS	Goals
1	(Belgium) Tom Boon	(Netherlands) Bloemendaal	6	3	1	10
2	(Belgium) Tanguy Cosyns	(Belgium) Daring	3	3	0	6
3	(Germany) Christopher Zeller	(Germany) Rot-Weiss Köln	4	1	0	5
4	(Netherlands) Constantijn Jonker	(Netherlands) Kampong	4	0	0	4
4	(Germany) Mats Grambusch	(Germany) Rot-Weiss Köln	4	0	0	4
4	(England) Mark Gleghorne	(England) East Grinstead	2	2	0	4
4	(Netherlands) Mink van der Weerden	(Netherlands) Oranje Zwart	1	2	1	4
4	(Belgium) Loïck Luypaert	(Netherlands) Kampong	0	4	0	4
9	(Netherlands) Diede van Puffelen	(Netherlands) Bloemendaal	3	0	0	3
9	(Belgium) Mathew Cobbaert	(Belgium) Dragons	3	0	0	3
9	(Austria) Alexander Bele	(Austria) Arminen	2	1	0	3
9	(Germany) Tom Grambusch	(Germany) Rot-Weiss Köln	0	2	1	3

== See also ==
- 2015 EuroHockey Club Champions Cup
- 2015 Men's EuroHockey Club Champions Trophy
- 2015 Men's EuroHockey Indoor Club Champions Cup
