= Jeffrey Thys =

Belgian field hockey player (born 1988)

Personal information
- Born: 14 April 1988 (age 38) Brasschaat, Belgium
- Height: 181 cm (5 ft 11 in)

Sport
- Sport: Field hockey
- Club: KHC Dragons
Youth career
- Team
- –: KHC Dragons
Senior career
Years	Team	Caps	Goals
–	KHC Dragons	-	-
National team
Years	Team	Caps	Goals
–	Belgium		-

Jeffrey Thys (born 14 April 1988, in Brasschaat) is a Belgian field hockey Player. At the 2012 Summer Olympics, he competed for the national team in the men's tournament.
