= HC Oranje-Rood =

Dutch field hockey club

Oranje-Rood
- Full name: Hockeyclub Oranje-Rood
- Short name: OR
- League: Men's Hoofdklasse; Women's Promotieklasse
- Founded: 1 July 2016; 10 years ago
- Home ground: Sportpark Aalsterweg, Eindhoven, Netherlands (Capacity 2,000)
- Website: Club website
| Home | Away |

Hockeyclub Oranje-Rood (Dutch pronunciation: [oːˌrɑɲə ˈroːt]), also known as HC Oranje-Rood or simply Oranje-Rood, is a Dutch professional field hockey club based in Eindhoven, North Brabant. The club was founded on 1 July 2016 as a merger of Oranje Zwart and EMHC.

In May 2019, the first women's team won the club its first prize by winning the Dutch national cup, the Gold Cup.

== Honours ==
=== Men ===
Euro Hockey League

- Runners-up (1): 2016–17

=== Women ===
Gold Cup

- Winners (1): 2018–19

== Current squad ==
=== Men's squad ===
As of 11 September 2025

| No. | Pos. | Nation | Player |
|---|---|---|---|
| 1 | GK | ARG | Tomás Santiago |
| 2 | MF | NED | Niek van der Schoot |
| 3 | DF | BEL | Arthur De Sloover |
| 5 | MF | NED | Boaz Houben |
| 7 | MF | NED | Max de Bie |
| 8 | FW | NED | Noud van Deijck |
| 9 | FW | NED | Jelle Galema |
| 10 | FW | ESP | Pol Cabré-Verdiell |
| 11 | MF | ESP | Gerard Clapés |
| 12 | DF | NED | Gijs van Merriënboer |
| 13 | FW | SCO | Struan Walker |

| No. | Pos. | Nation | Player |
|---|---|---|---|
| 14 | FW | ESP | Borja Lacalle |
| 15 | | NED | Isha Houben |
| 16 | MF | NED | Florian Gosselink |
| 17 | FW | NED | Thijs Bams |
| 18 | DF | NED | Sem de Roij |
| 19 | FW | NED | Bob de Voogd |
| 21 | FW | GER | Henrik Mertgens |
| 22 | DF | NED | Jacky van Hout |
| 23 | DF | NED | Joep de Mol (Captain) |
| 26 | GK | NED | Nieki Verbeek |
| 29 | MF | NED | Tijmen Reyenga |
