= Field hockey at the 2012 Summer Olympics – Men's tournament =

Men's field hockey at the 2012 Summer Olympics
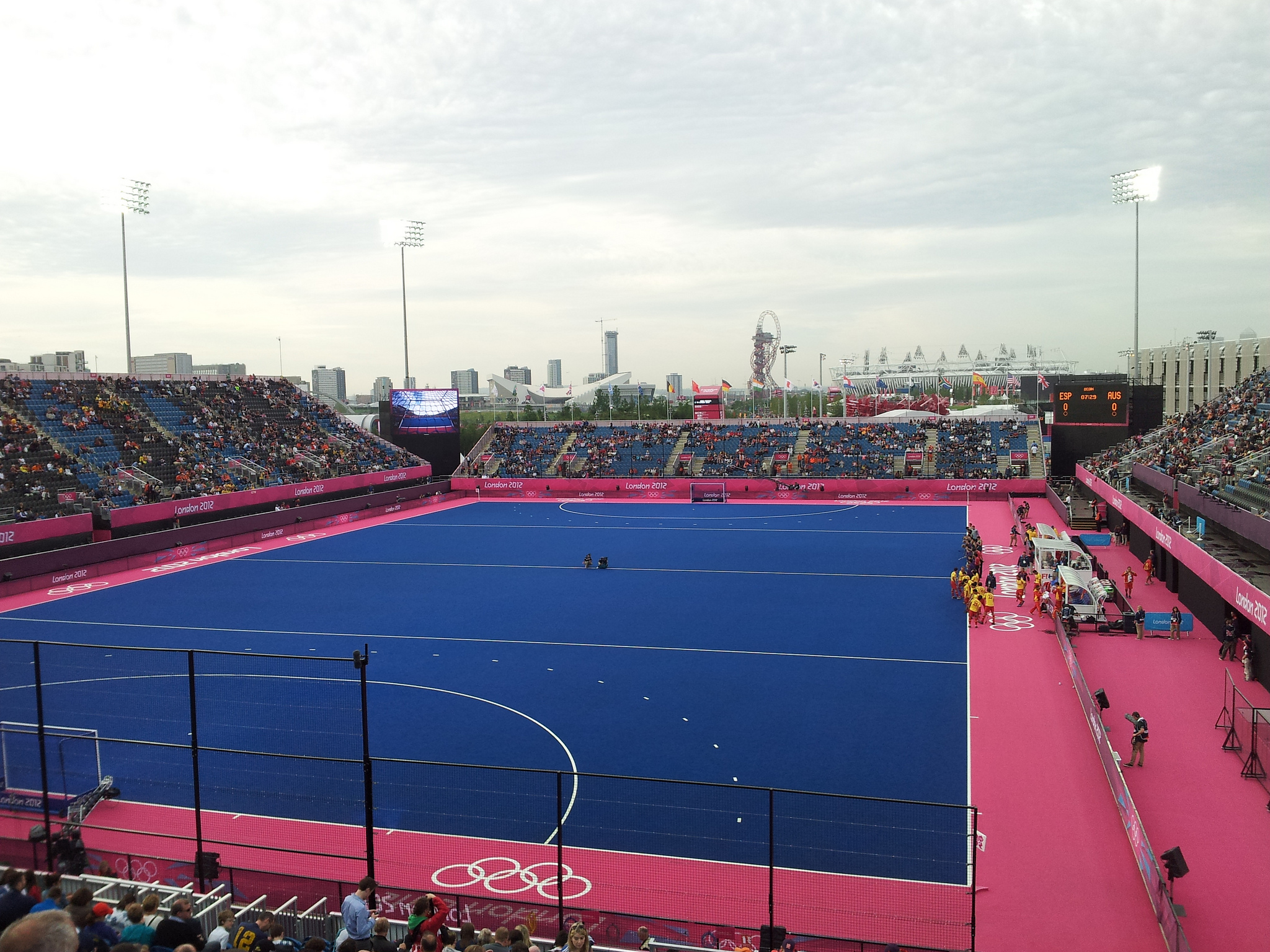
- Riverbank Arena

Tournament details
- Host country: United Kingdom
- City: London
- Dates: 30 July – 11 August
- Teams: 12 (from 5 confederations)
- Venue: Riverbank Arena

Final positions
- Champions: Germany (4th title)
- Runner-up: Netherlands
- Third place: Australia

Tournament statistics
- Matches played: 38
- Goals scored: 185 (4.87 per match)
- Top scorer: (Netherlands) Mink van der Weerden (8 goals)

The men's field hockey tournament at the 2012 Summer Olympics was the 22nd edition of the field hockey event for men at the Summer Olympic Games. It was held over a thirteen-day period beginning on 30 July, and culminating with the medal finals on 11 August. All games were played at the Riverbank Arena within the Olympic Park in London, United Kingdom.

Defending champions Germany won the gold medal for the fourth time after defeating the Netherlands 2–1 in the final. Australia won the bronze medal by defeating Great Britain 3–1.

== Competition format ==
The twelve teams in the tournament were divided into two pools of six, with each team initially playing round-robin games within their pool. Following the completion of the round-robin, the top two teams from each pool advance to the semi-finals. All other teams play classification matches to determine the final tournament rankings. The two semi-final winners meet for the gold medal match, while the semi-final losers play in the bronze medal match.

== Qualification ==
Each of the continental champions from five federations and host received an automatic berth. The European and Oceanian federations received two and one extra quotas respectively based upon the FIH World Rankings at the completion of the 2010 World Cup. In addition to the three teams qualifying through the Olympic Qualifying Tournaments, the following twelve teams, shown with final pre-tournament rankings, competed in this tournament.

Date	Event	Location	Quotas	Qualifier(s)
Host nation			1	Great Britain (4)
15–25 November 2010	2010 Asian Games	Guangzhou, China	1	Pakistan (8)
20–28 August 2011	2011 EuroHockey Championship	Mönchengladbach, Germany	3	Germany (2); Netherlands (3); Belgium^{1} (11)
2–11 September 2011	2011 African Olympic Qualifier	Bulawayo, Zimbabwe	0	—^{2}
6–9 October 2011	2011 Oceania Cup	Hobart, Australia	2	Australia (1); New Zealand (7)
14–30 October 2011	2011 Pan American Games	Guadalajara, Mexico	1	Argentina (9)
18–26 February 2012	Olympic Qualification Tournament 1	New Delhi, India	1	India (10)
10–18 March 2012	Olympic Qualification Tournament 2	Dublin, Ireland	1	South Korea (6)
26 April – 6 May 2012	Olympic Qualification Tournament 3	Kakamigahara, Japan	1	South Africa (12)
Invitational			1	Spain^{2} (5)
Total			12	

^1 – Great Britain automatically qualified as host nation, therefore the berth obtained by England as third placed team at the 2011 EuroHockey Nations Championship was given to fourth placed team Belgium.
^2 – South Africa won the African qualifier tournament but gave up their automatic berth on the premise that they should play a qualifier having deemed the African tournament as sub-standard. Eventually they won the Qualification Tournament 3. Instead, Spain was invited as the highest ranked team not already qualified after the conclusion of the continental championships.

== Umpires ==
The FIH announced the list of umpires on 3 January 2012:

- Christian Blasch (GER)
- Ged Curran (GBR)
- David Gentles (AUS)
- Marcin Grochal (POL)
- Colin Hutchinson (IRL)
- Nigel Iggo (NZL)
- Hamish Jamson (GBR)
- Kim Hong-lae (KOR)
- German Montes de Oca (ARG)
- Raghu Prasad (IND)
- Tim Pullman (AUS)
- Marcelo Servetto (ESP)
- Gary Simmonds (RSA)
- Nathan Stagno (GBR)
- Simon Taylor (NZL)
- Roel van Eert (NED)
- John Wright (RSA)

== Preliminary round ==
All times are British Summer Time (UTC+01:00)'

=== Pool A ===
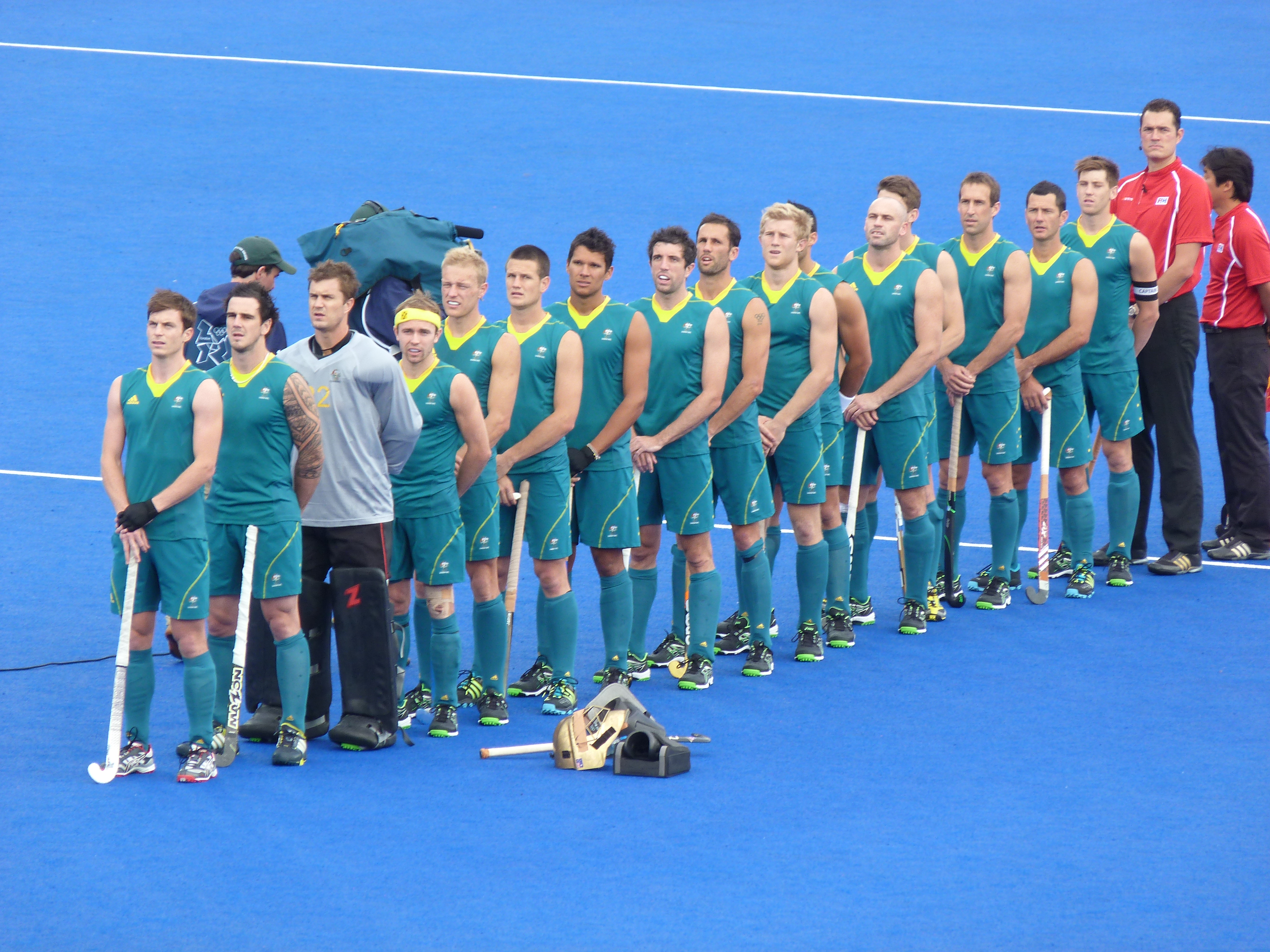
Australia national field hockey team line up for their game against Spain.

Pos	Team	Pld	W	D	L	GF	GA	GD	Pts	Qualification
1	Australia	5	3	2	0	23	5	+18	11	Semi-finals
2	Great Britain (H)	5	2	3	0	14	8	+6	9	Semi-finals
3	Spain	5	2	2	1	8	10	−2	8	Fifth place game
4	Pakistan	5	2	1	2	9	16	−7	7	Seventh place game
5	Argentina	5	1	1	3	10	14	−4	4	Ninth place game
6	South Africa	5	0	1	4	11	22	−11	1	Eleventh place game

Source: FIH
(H) Hosts

30 July 2012
10:45

Australia	6–0	South Africa
Dywer 16', 48', 58'; Butturini 33'; Ciriello 46'; Turner 62'	Report

Umpires:
Roel van Eert (NED)
Marcin Grochal (POL)

30 July 2012
13:45

Spain	1–1	Pakistan
Quemada 47'	Report	Butt 46'

Umpires:
Simon Taylor (NZL)
Nigel Iggo (NZL)

30 July 2012
19:00

Great Britain	4–1	Argentina
Middleton 22', 42'; Fox 49'; Smith 53'	Report	Ibarra 55'

Umpires:
Raghu Prasad (IND)
Christian Blasch (GER)

1 August 2012
08:30

Spain	0–5	Australia
	Report	Ford 9'; Butturini 14'; Orchard 29'; Turner 40'; Ockenden 69'

Umpires:
Kim Hong-lae (KOR)
Christian Blasch (GER)

1 August 2012
16:00

South Africa	2–2	Great Britain
Smith 60'; Robinson 64'	Report	Jackson 14', 68'

Umpires:
Nigel Iggo (NZL)
Roel van Eert (NED)

1 August 2012
19:00

Pakistan	2–0	Argentina
Imran 30'; Abbas 44'	Report

Umpires:
John Wright (RSA)
Marcin Grochal (POL)

3 August 2012
08:30

Australia	2–2	Argentina
Butturini 12'; Dwyer 35'	Report	M. Vila 37'; Peillat 68'

Umpires:
Raghu Prasad (IND)
John Wright (RSA)

3 August 2012
16:00

Great Britain	4–1	Pakistan
Tindall 4'; Clarke 26'; Jackson 50', 67'	Report	Abbas 70'

Umpires:
Simon Taylor (NZL)
Marcelo Servetto (ESP)

3 August 2012
19:00

South Africa	2–3	Spain
Reid-Ross 26'; Norris-Jones 63'	Report	Salles 30'; Quemada 42'; Delas 55'

Umpires:
German Montes de Oca (ARG)
Tim Pullman (AUS)

5 August 2012
10:45

Pakistan	5–4	South Africa
Khan 20', 26'; Rasool 23'; Abbas 64'; Ahmed 67'	Report	McDade 2'; Reid-Ross 22', 35'; Paton 48'

Umpires:
Marcelo Servetto (ESP)
Colin Hutchinson (IRL)

5 August 2012
19:00

Great Britain	3–3	Australia
Clarke 47'; Middleton 53'; Tindall 66'	Report	Ford 7', 11'; Knowles 41'

Umpires:
Christian Blasch (GER)
John Wright (RSA)

5 August 2012
21:15

Argentina	1–3	Spain
L. Vila 55'	Report	Quemada 66'; Delas 67'; Tubau 70'

Umpires:
Hamish Jamson (GBR)
Tim Pullman (AUS)

7 August 2012
10:45

Australia	7–0	Pakistan
de Young 5'; Knowles 6'; Ciriello 29', 34'; Ford 42'; Dwyer 48'; Turner 70'	Report

Umpires:
Gary Simmonds (RSA)
Christian Blasch (GER)

7 August 2012
13:45

Argentina	6–3	South Africa
Peillat 25', 39', 65'; Rossi 33'; Callioni 45', 50'	Report	Reid-Ross 7'; Norris-Jones 8'; Robinson 64'

Umpires:
Raghu Prasad (IND)
Nathan Stagno (GIB)

7 August 2012
19:00

Spain	1–1	Great Britain
Quemada 55'	Report	Jackson 33'

Umpires:
Simon Taylor (NZL)
John Wright (RSA)

=== Pool B ===
Pos	Team	Pld	W	D	L	GF	GA	GD	Pts	Qualification
1	Netherlands	5	5	0	0	18	7	+11	15	Semi-finals
2	Germany	5	3	1	1	14	11	+3	10	Semi-finals
3	Belgium	5	2	1	2	8	7	+1	7	Fifth place game
4	South Korea	5	2	0	3	9	8	+1	6	Seventh place game
5	New Zealand	5	1	2	2	10	14	−4	5	Ninth place game
6	India	5	0	0	5	6	18	−12	0	Eleventh place game

Source: FIH

30 July 2012
08:30

South Korea	2–0	New Zealand
You 20', 34'	Report

Umpires:
Hamish Jamson (GBR)
German Montes de Oca (ARG)

30 July 2012
16:00

Netherlands	3–2	India
Van der Horst 20'; Weusthof 29'; Van der Weerden 51'	Report	D. Singh 45'; Sh. Singh 48'

Umpires:
Tim Pullman (AUS)
Nathan Stagno (GIB)

30 July 2012
21:15

Germany	2–1	Belgium
Fuchs 13'; Zeller 45'	Report	Dekeyser 4'

Umpires:
Colin Hutchinson (IRL)
Marcelo Servetto (ESP)

1 August 2012
10:45

Belgium	1–3	Netherlands
Dekeyser 58'	Report	Van der Weerden 43', 62'; De Voogd 70'

Umpires:
Hamish Jamson (NZL)
Gary Simmonds (RSA)

1 August 2012
13:45

New Zealand	3–1	India
Hayward 13'; Burrows 24'; Wilson 29'	Report	San. Singh 2'

Umpires:
Ged Curran (GBR)
Colin Hutchinson (IRL)

1 August 2012
21:15

South Korea	0–1	Germany
	Report	Zeller 33'

Umpires:
David Gentles (AUS)
Nathan Stagno (GIB)

3 August 2012
10:45

Netherlands	5–1	New Zealand
Weusthof 16'; Van der Weerden 27'; Bakker 29', 56'; Kemperman 67'	Report	Child 5'

Umpires:
Ged Curran (GBR)
Nathan Stagno (GIB)

3 August 2012
13:45

Germany	5–2	India
Fuchs 7', 16', 36'; Korn 24'; Wesley 34'	Report	Raghunath 13'; Khandker 62'

Umpires:
Kim Hong-lae (KOR)
Gary Simmonds (RSA)

3 August 2012
21:15

Belgium	2–1	South Korea
Boon 37'; Charlier 61'	Report	Nam 46'

Umpires:
David Gentles (AUS)
Nigel Iggo (NZL)

5 August 2012
08:30

New Zealand	1–1	Belgium
Wilson 54'	Report	Boon 48'

Umpires:
German Montes de Oca (ARG)
Roel van Eert (NED)

5 August 2012
13:15

India	1–4	South Korea
Chandi 10'	Report	Jang 6'; Nam 59', 70'; Seo 68'

Umpires:
Simon Taylor (NZL)
Gary Simmonds (RSA)

5 August 2012
16:00

Netherlands	3–1	Germany
De Voogd 14'; De Nooijer 36'; Van der Weerden 41'	Report	Zeller 3'

Umpires:
David Gentles (AUS)
Ged Curran (GBR)

7 August 2012
08:30

South Korea	2–4	Netherlands
Nam 53'; Lee N. 62'	Report	Van der Weerden 17'; Verga 21'; Weusthof 47'; Bakker 64'

Umpires:
Marcin Grochal (POL)
Ged Curran (GBR)

7 August 2012
16:00

India	0–3	Belgium
	Report	Dekeyser 15'; Boccard 47'; Boon 67'

Umpires:
Kim Hong-lae (KOR)
Nigel Iggo (NZL)

7 August 2012
21:15

Germany	5–5	New Zealand
Deecke 10'; Fuchs 27'; Stralkowski 47'; Zeller 51', 69'	Report	Wilson 4'; Petherick 6'; Jenness 21'; Child 30', 36'

Umpires:
David Gentles (AUS)
Hamish Jamson (GBR)

== Classification round ==
=== Fifth to twelfth place classification ===
==== Eleventh and twelfth place ====
11 August 2012
08:30

South Africa	3–2	India
Cronje 8'; Drummond 34'; Norris-Jones 65'	Report	San. Singh 14'; D. Singh 67'

Umpires:
Kim Hong-lae (KOR)
German Montes de Oca (ARG)

==== Ninth and tenth place ====
9 August 2012
08:30

Argentina	1–3	New Zealand
Ibarra 59'	Report	Jenness 4'; Petherick 21'; Wilson 29'

Umpires:
Marcin Grochal (POL)
Tim Pullman (AUS)

==== Seventh and eighth place ====
9 August 2012
11:30

Pakistan	3–2	South Korea
Waqas 31'; Khan 44'; Imran 61'	Report	Hyun 30', 33'

Umpires:
Marcelo Servetto (ESP)
Simon Taylor (NZL)

==== Fifth and sixth place ====
11 August 2012
11:30

Spain	2–5	Belgium
Alegre 19'; Tubau 61'	Report	Dekeyser 3'; Boon 21', 32'; Van Aubel 24'; Briels 52'

Umpires:
Roel van Eert (NED)
Colin Hutchinson (IRL)

=== Medal round ===
Semi-finals
9 August
Australia	2
Germany	4
9 August
Netherlands	9
Great Britain	2

Gold medal match
11 August
Germany	2
Netherlands	1
Bronze medal match
11 August
Australia	3
Great Britain	1

==== Semi-finals ====
9 August 2012
15:30

Australia	2–4	Germany
Govers 22'; Turner 42'	Report	Fürste 27'; Witthaus 54'; Weß 59'; Fuchs 63'

Umpires:
Gary Simmonds (RSA)
Hamish Jamson (GBR)

9 August 2012
20:00

Netherlands	9–2	Great Britain
Weusthof 9', 15', 60'; Van der Weerden 22'; Bakker 33', 44', 51'; De Nooijer 47'; Evers 48'	Report	Jackson 18'; Moore 65'

Umpires:
Christian Blasch (GER)
David Gentles (AUS)

==== Bronze medal match ====
11 August 2012
15:30

(bronze) Australia	3–1	Great Britain
Orchard 17'; Dwyer 48'; Govers 57'	Report	Lewers 29'

Umpires:
Christian Blach (GER)
Gary Simmonds (RSA)

==== Gold medal match ====
11 August 2012
20:00

(gold) Germany	2–1	Netherlands (silver)
Rabente 33', 66'	Report	Van der Weerden 54'

Umpires:
David Gentles (AUS)
Ged Curran (GBR)

== Final ranking ==
As per statistical convention in field hockey, matches decided in regular time are counted as wins and losses, while matches decided by penalty shoot-outs are counted as draws.

Pos	Team	Pld	W	D	L	GF	GA	GD	Pts	Final result
1st place, gold medalist(s)	Germany	7	5	1	1	20	14	+6	16	Gold Medal
2nd place, silver medalist(s)	Netherlands	7	6	0	1	28	11	+17	18	Silver Medal
3rd place, bronze medalist(s)	Australia	7	4	2	1	28	10	+18	14	Bronze Medal
4	Great Britain (H)	7	2	3	2	17	20	−3	9	Fourth place
5	Belgium	6	3	1	2	13	9	+4	10	Eliminated in group stage
6	Spain	6	2	2	2	10	15	−5	8	Eliminated in group stage
7	Pakistan	6	3	1	2	12	18	−6	10	Eliminated in group stage
8	South Korea	6	2	0	4	11	11	0	6	Eliminated in group stage
9	New Zealand	6	2	2	2	13	15	−2	8	Eliminated in group stage
10	Argentina	6	1	1	4	11	17	−6	4	Eliminated in group stage
11	South Africa	6	1	1	4	14	24	−10	4	Eliminated in group stage
12	India	6	0	0	6	8	21	−13	0	Eliminated in group stage

Source: FIH
(H) Hosts

== Goalscorers ==
There were 185 goals scored in 38 matches, for an average of 4.87 goals per match.

8 goals

- (Netherlands) Mink van der Weerden

6 goals

- (Australia) Jamie Dwyer
- (United Kingdom) Ashley Jackson
- (Germany) Florian Fuchs
- (Netherlands) Billy Bakker
- (Netherlands) Roderick Weusthof

5 goals

- (Belgium) Tom Boon
- (Germany) Christopher Zeller

4 goals

- (Argentina) Gonzalo Peillat
- (Australia) Russell Ford
- (Australia) Glenn Turner
- (Belgium) Jérôme Dekeyser
- (Spain) Pau Quemada
- (South Korea) Nam Hyun-Woo
- (New Zealand) Nick Wilson
- (South Africa) Justin Reid-Ross

3 goals

- (Australia) Matthew Butturini
- (Australia) Chris Ciriello
- (United Kingdom) Barry Middleton
- (New Zealand) Simon Child
- (Pakistan) Sohail Abbas
- (Pakistan) Abdul Haseem Khan
- (South Africa) Lloyd Norris-Jones

2 goals

- (Argentina) Facundo Callioni
- (Argentina) Pedro Ibarra
- (Australia) Kieran Govers
- (Australia) Mark Knowles
- (Australia) Simon Orchard
- (Spain) Miguel Delas
- (Spain) Eduard Tubau
- (United Kingdom) Jonty Clarke
- (United Kingdom) James Tindall
- (Germany) Jan-Philipp Rabente
- (India) Dharamvir Singh
- (India) Sandeep Singh
- (South Korea) Hyun Hye-Sung
- (South Korea) You Hyo-Sik
- (Netherlands) Teun de Nooijer
- (Netherlands) Bob de Voogd
- (New Zealand) Stephen Jenness
- (New Zealand) Richard Petherick
- (Pakistan) Muhammad Imran
- (South Africa) Jonathan Robinson

1 goal

- (Argentina) Lucas Rossi
- (Argentina) Lucas Vila
- (Argentina) Matias Vila
- (Australia) Liam de Young
- (Australia) Eddie Ockenden
- (Belgium) Gauthier Boccard
- (Belgium) Thomas Briels
- (Belgium) Cédric Charlier
- (Belgium) Florent van Aubel
- (Spain) Ramón Alegre
- (Spain) Marc Salles
- (United Kingdom) Daniel Fox
- (United Kingdom) Iain Lewers
- (United Kingdom) Robert Moore
- (United Kingdom) Richard Smith
- (Germany) Oskar Deecke
- (Germany) Moritz Fürste
- (Germany) Oliver Korn
- (Germany) Thilo Stralkowski
- (Germany) Christopher Wesley
- (Germany) Timo Weß
- (Germany) Matthias Witthaus
- (India) Gurwinder Singh
- (India) Tushar Khandker
- (India) Shivendra Singh
- (India) V. R. Raghunath
- (South Korea) Jang Jong-hyun
- (South Korea) Lee Nam-yong
- (South Korea) Lee Seung-il
- (Netherlands) Floris Evers
- (Netherlands) Robbert Kemperman
- (Netherlands) Robert van der Horst
- (Netherlands) Valentin Verga
- (New Zealand) Phil Burrows
- (New Zealand) Andy Hayward
- (Pakistan) Waseem Ahmed
- (Pakistan) Rehan Butt
- (Pakistan) Shafqat Rasool
- (Pakistan) Muhammad Waqas
- (South Africa) Andrew Cronje
- (South Africa) Timothy Drummond
- (South Africa) Thornton McDade
- (South Africa) Wade Paton
- (South Africa) Austin Smith

Source: FIH
