= Eindhovense Mixed Hockey Club =

EMHC
- Full name: Eindhovense Mixed Hockey Club
- Founded: 14 October 1921
- Dissolved: 1 July 2016

The Eindhovense Mixed Hockey Club (acronym: EMHC) was a Dutch field hockey club, which was located in Eindhoven, North Brabant. The club was founded on 14 October 1921, and had about 1,000 members. This made it the second biggest club of the city, after neighbouring Oranje Zwart.

In 2016, the club merged with Oranje Zwart. The name of the new club is HC Oranje-Rood.

== Honours ==
=== Women ===
Dutch national title: 3

- 1957, 1966, 1968

== Notable players ==
- Det de Beus
- Fieke Boekhorst
