= Men's Euro Hockey League =

Annual men's field hockey tournament

Euro Hockey League
- Current season, competition or edition: 2026–27 Men's Euro Hockey League
- Formerly: EuroHockey Club Champions Cup
- Sport: Field hockey
- Founded: 2007; 19 years ago
- First season: 2007–08
- No. of teams: 20
- Confederation: EHF (Europe)
- Most recent champion: (Netherlands) Kampong (2nd title) (2025–26)
- Most titles: (Netherlands) Bloemendaal (6 titles)
- Related competitions: Men's EuroHockey Club Trophy I (2nd tier)
- Website: ehlhockey.tv

The Euro Hockey League is an annual field hockey cup competition organized by the EHF for the very top field hockey clubs in Europe. The competition was launched at the start of the 2007-08 field hockey season when it merged and replaced the men's EuroHockey Club Champions Cup (the champions competition) and the EuroHockey Cup Winners Cup (the Cup Winners' competition). Featuring many of the world's best players, the EHL is now seen as the pinnacle of club hockey in Europe (hockey's equivalent of the UEFA Champions League) with top clubs from across the continent playing what many consider to be the most exciting and dynamic club hockey in the world.

The competition has been won by ten clubs, three of which have won it more than once. Bloemendaal is the most successful club in the tournament's history; having won it six times. In 2019, the Waterloo Ducks became the first Belgian club to win the tournament. Dutch clubs have the highest number of victories (11 wins), followed by Germany (5 wins) and Belgium (2 wins).

== Format ==
From the 2019–20 season onwards the tournament features 20 clubs from the 11 highest-ranked EHF member countries. Although the competition is called the Euro Hockey League, after round 1 the competition was a knock-out, rather than league format (similar to the UEFA Champions League in football). From the 2019–20 season onwards round one is also a knock-out format.

=== Qualification ===
From the 2019–20 season onwards each year the 20 available league places are allocated between 11 EHF member countries' National Associations, depending on those National Associations' EHF Club Ranking. National Associations ranked 1–3 in the EHL Ranking Table may enter three teams each in the Euro Hockey League, while National Associations ranked 4-6 may enter two teams each, and National Associations ranked 7-11 one team.

National Associations rankings are derived from each country's results in the Euro Hockey League and EuroHockey Club Trophy over the previous 3 years, with the points in the earlier years discounted by 50% (year 2) and 75% (year 1). This ranking of National Associations is based on the performance of all their clubs in the Euro Hockey League and EuroHockey Club Trophy. The total number of points won by clubs from each country is divided by the number of clubs to which the National Association was entitled in that year's competitions.

Each qualifying National Association is required to enter their national champion club but is otherwise free to decide the system of qualification for their own clubs for any remaining places to which they are entitled that year.

To be eligible to play in the Euro Hockey League a country must enter 2 clubs in the EHF club competitions.

=== Tournament ===
From the 2019–20 season the EHL moved to a new format with the removal of the round-robin tournament in round one. Instead, a knock-out format is used from the start of the tournament. Round one will be replaced by the knockout 16 with four sides advancing to the quarter-finals, or Final 8 as it's called, on Easter. The Final8 will consist of the champions from the top four nations on the EHL rankings table alongside the four sides that qualified from the knockout 16. This means that instead of a total of 24 teams from 12 associations there will be 20 teams from 11 associations.

== Sponsorship ==
The much-improved presentation and packaging of the Euro Hockey League have attracted a number of high-profile sponsors, most notably Dutch bank ABN-AMRO, who are the presenting sponsor of the tournament. Vriendloterij are also named sponsors of the Euro Hockey League.

== Summaries ==
Season	Final round host	Final			Bronze medal match			Number of teams
Season	Final round host	Winner	Score	Runner-up	Third place	Score	Fourth place	Number of teams
2007–08; Details	Rotterdam, Netherlands	(Germany); UHC Hamburg	1–0 (a.e.t.)	(Netherlands); HGC	(Netherlands); Rotterdam	2–2 (2–1 s.o.)	(Spain); Club Egara	24
2008–09; Details	Rotterdam, Netherlands	(Netherlands); Bloemendaal	5–4	(Germany); UHC Hamburg	(Netherlands); Rotterdam	8–1	(Belgium); Leuven	24
2009–10; Details	Amstelveen, Netherlands	(Germany); UHC Hamburg	3–1	(Netherlands); Rotterdam	(Netherlands); Amsterdam	4–3 (a.e.t.)	(Spain); Real Club de Polo	24
2010–11; Details	Wassenaar, Netherlands	(Netherlands); HGC	1–0	(Spain); Club de Campo	(England); Reading	3–2	(Netherlands); Oranje Zwart	24
2011–12; Details	Amstelveen, Netherlands	(Germany); UHC Hamburg	2–2 (2–1 s.o.)	(Netherlands); Amsterdam	(Belgium); Dragons	4–3 (a.e.t.)	(Netherlands); Rotterdam	24
2012–13; Details	Bloemendaal, Netherlands	(Netherlands); Bloemendaal	2–0	(Belgium); Dragons	(Netherlands); Amsterdam	5–3	(Germany); Rot-Weiss Köln	24
2013–14; Details	Eindhoven, Netherlands	(Germany); Harvestehuder THC	2–2 (3–1 s.o.)	(Netherlands); Oranje Zwart	(Belgium); Dragons	2–1	(Belgium); Racing	24
2014–15; Details	Bloemendaal, Netherlands	(Netherlands); Oranje Zwart	1–1 (6–5 s.o.)	(Germany); UHC Hamburg	(Netherlands); Bloemendaal	1–0	(Belgium); Daring	24
2015–16; Details	Barcelona, Spain	(Netherlands); Kampong	2–0	(Netherlands); Amsterdam	(Germany); Harvestehuder THC	3–2	(Spain); Atlètic Terrassa	24
2016–17; Details	Brasschaat, Belgium	(Germany); Rot-Weiss Köln	3–2	(Netherlands); Oranje-Rood	(Belgium); Dragons	3–1	(England); Wimbledon	24
2017–18; Details	Bloemendaal, Netherlands	(Netherlands); Bloemendaal	4–1	(Netherlands); Kampong	(Netherlands); Rotterdam	3–2	(Belgium); Herakles	24
2018–19; Details	Eindhoven, Netherlands	(Belgium); Waterloo Ducks	4–0	(Germany); Rot-Weiss Köln	(Germany); Mannheimer HC	3–1	(Spain); Real Club de Polo	24
2019–20; Details	Amstelveen, Netherlands	Cancelled due to the COVID-19 pandemic.						20
2021; Details	Amstelveen, Netherlands	(Netherlands); Bloemendaal	5–2	(Spain); Atlètic Terrassa	(Belgium); Léopold	4–2	(Germany); Uhlenhorst Mülheim	4
2022; Details	Amstelveen, Netherlands	(Netherlands); Bloemendaal	4–0	(Germany); Rot-Weiss Köln	(England); Surbiton	2–1	(Spain); Club de Campo	10
2022–23; Details	Amstelveen, Netherlands	(Netherlands); Bloemendaal	1–0	(Germany); Rot-Weiss Köln	(Belgium); Racing	3–0	(Spain); Atlètic Terrassa	20
2023–24; Details	Amstelveen, Netherlands	(Netherlands); Pinoké	1–0	(Netherlands); Kampong	(England); Old Georgians	3–2	(Germany); Rot-Weiss Köln	20
2024–25; Details	's-Hertogenbosch, Netherlands	(Belgium); Gantoise	5–2	(Netherlands); Bloemendaal	(Netherlands); Rotterdam	2–0	(Netherlands); Kampong	20
2025–26; Details	's-Hertogenbosch, Netherlands	(Netherlands); Kampong	3–2	(Belgium); Gantoise	(Netherlands); Amsterdam	2–2 (4–3 s.o.)	(Spain); Club de Campo	20
2026–27; Details	Eindhoven, Netherlands							20

== Records and statistics ==
=== Performances by club ===
Rank	Club	Gold	Silver	Bronze	Total
1	(Netherlands) Bloemendaal	6	1	1	8
2	(Germany) UHC Hamburg	3	2	0	5
3	(Netherlands) Kampong	2	2	0	4
4	(Germany) Rot-Weiss Köln	1	3	0	4
5	(Belgium) Gantoise	1	1	0	2
5	(Netherlands) HGC	1	1	0	2
5	(Netherlands) Oranje Zwart	1	1	0	2
8	(Germany) Harvestehuder THC	1	0	1	2
9	(Netherlands) Pinoké	1	0	0	1
9	(Belgium) Waterloo Ducks	1	0	0	1
11	(Netherlands) Amsterdam	0	2	3	5
12	(Netherlands) Rotterdam	0	1	4	5
13	(Belgium) Dragons	0	1	3	4
14	(Spain) Atlètic Terrassa	0	1	0	1
14	(Spain) Club de Campo	0	1	0	1
14	(Netherlands) Oranje-Rood	0	1	0	1
17	(Belgium) Léopold	0	0	1	1
17	(Germany) Mannheimer HC	0	0	1	1
17	(England) Old Georgians	0	0	1	1
17	(Belgium) Racing	0	0	1	1
21–22	Remaining	0	0	2	2
Totals (22 entries)		18	18	18	54

=== Performances by nation ===
Rank	Nation	Gold	Silver	Bronze	Total
1	Netherlands (NED)	11	9	8	28
2	Germany (GER)	5	5	2	12
3	Belgium (BEL)	2	2	5	9
4	Spain (ESP)	0	2	0	2
5	England (ENG)	0	0	3	3
Totals (5 entries)		18	18	18	54

== Lower tournaments ==
The Euro Hockey League is the top men's club competition in Europe. Below the Euro Hockey League is the EuroHockey Club Trophy, then below that the EuroHockey Club Challenge 1, the EuroHockey Club Challenge 2, and so on. This structure is designed to give every EHF member nation the opportunity to enter their best clubs into European competition at an appropriate level, and through that exposure to improve the level of their domestic hockey.

== See also ==
- EuroHockey Club Champions Cup
- EuroHockey Club Trophy
- Men's EuroHockey Indoor Club Cup
- Women's Euro Hockey League
