= Oranje Zwart =

Dutch field hockey club

- Full name: Mixed Hockey Club Oranje Zwart
- Short name: OZ
- Founded: 1 September 1933
- Dissolved: 1 July 2016
- Home ground: Sportpark Aalsterweg, Eindhoven, Netherlands (Capacity 2,000)

Mixed Hockeyclub Oranje Zwart was a Dutch professional field hockey club located in Eindhoven, North Brabant, which was founded on 1 September 1933. With around 1,700 members – as at 3 May 2006 – it was one of the biggest clubs in the Netherlands. The 2,000 capacity Sportpark Aalsterweg is their home venue.

In 2016, the club merged with neighbouring club EMHC. The name of the new club is HC Oranje-Rood.

== Honours ==
=== Men ===
- Hoofdklasse
  - Winners (4): 2004–05, 2013–14, 2014–15, 2015–16
  - Runners-up (4): 1998–99, 2000–01, 2002–03, 2012–13
- Euro Hockey League
  - Winners (1): 2014–15
  - Runners-up (1): 2013–14
- EuroHockey Cup Winners Cup
  - Winners (2): 2002, 2004
- Hoofdklasse indoor
  - Winners (10): 1980–81, 1984–85, 1990–91, 1991–92, 1993–94, 1996–97, 2001–02, 2002–03, 2003–04, 2004–05
- EuroHockey Indoor Club Trophy
  - Winners (2): 2004, 2006
- EuroHockey Indoor Club Challenge I
  - Winners (1): 2003

=== Women ===
- Hoofdklasse
  - Winners (3): 1955–56, 1968–69, 1969–70

== Notable players from Oranje Zwart ==
- Shahbaz Ahmad
- Troy Elder
- Carsten Fischer
- Piet-Hein Geeris
- Robert van der Horst
- Ronald Jansen
- Josef Kramer
- Harrie Kwinten
- Tycho van Meer
- Rob Reckers
- Jay Stacy
- Margje Teeuwen
- Teun Rohof
- Darren Cheesman
- Matthijs Brouwer
- Brent Livermore
