= 2017–18 Euro Hockey League =

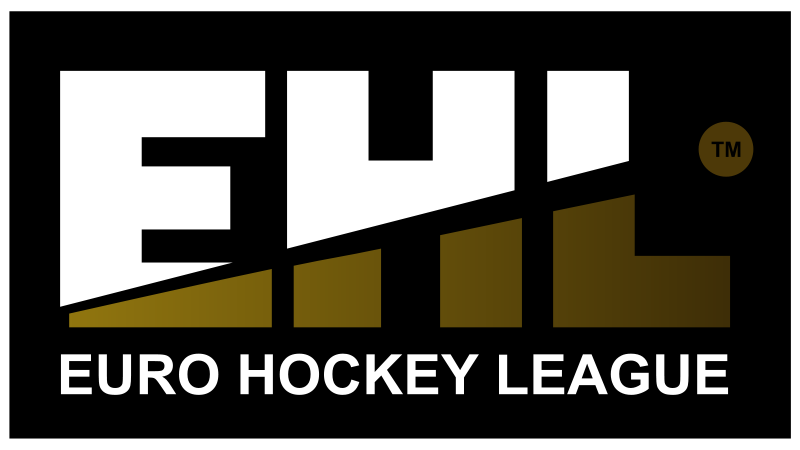

Tournament details
- City: Barcelona; Rotterdam; Bloemendaal
- Dates: 6 October 2017 – 27 May 2018
- Teams: 24
- Venue: 3 (in 3 host cities)

Final positions
- Champions: (Netherlands) Bloemendaal (3rd title)
- Runner-up: (Netherlands) Kampong
- Third place: (Netherlands) Rotterdam

Tournament statistics
- Matches played: 28
- Top scorer: (Netherlands) Roel Bovendeert (6 goals)

The Euro Hockey League 2017–18 was the eleventh season of the Euro Hockey League, Europe's premier club field hockey tournament. Round One was held in Barcelona and the round of 16 and quarterfinals in Rotterdam. The semi-finals, third place game and the final were held in Bloemendaal.

== Association team allocation ==
A total of 24 teams from 12 of the 45 EHF member associations participate in the 2018–19 Euro Hockey League. The association ranking based on the EHL country coefficients is used to determine the number of participating teams for each association:

- Associations 1–4 each have three teams qualify.
- Associations 5–8 each have two teams qualify.
- Associations 9–12 each have one team qualify.

=== EHL Rankings ===
Ranking		Member association	EHL Points				Places in EHL 2017/18		
2017	2016	Member association	2014/15 (25%)	2015/16 (50%)	2016/17 (100%)	Total	KO16	R1	Total
1	1	Netherlands	28.333	30.667	20.667	43.083	2	1	3
2	2	Germany	22.667	20.333	24.667	40.500	2	1	3
3	3	Belgium	18.667	16.667	18.333	31.334	2	1	3
4	4	Spain	14.000	17.667	17.000	29.334	2	1	3
5	5	England	13.000	11.000	16.500	25.250	1	1	2
6	8	Ireland	8.000	11.500	12.000	19.750	1	1	2
7	6	France	11.500	10.000	11.500	19.375	1	1	2
8	9	Russia	8.500	10.000	10.000	17.125	1	1	2
9	10	Scotland	6.500	9.500	10.500	16.875	0	1	1
10	7	Poland	11.500	9.500	7.500	15.125	0	1	1
11	13	Austria	7.000	4.000	9.500	13.250	0	1	1
12	12	Wales	2.000	7.500	6.000	10.250	0	1	1
13	11	Italy	6.500	6.000	5.500	10.125	0	0	0
14	17	Switzerland	0.000	3.500	7.500	9.250	0	0	0
15	15	Belarus	7.500	2.500	3.500	6.625	0	0	0
16	14	Czech Republic	6.500	4.500	2.000	5.875	0	0	0
17	16	Azerbaijan	5.500	0.000	0.000	1.375	0	0	0

=== Qualified teams ===
Round One
Champions	Non-champions	
(Scotland) Kelburne	(Netherlands) Bloemendaal	(England) Wimbledon
(Poland) Grunwald Poznań	(Germany) Uhlenhorst Mülheim	(Ireland) Banbridge
(Austria) Arminen	(Belgium) Racing Club de Bruxelles	(France) Saint Germain
(Wales) Cardiff & Met	(Spain) Club Egara	(Russia) Dinamo Elektrostal
KO16
Champions		Non-champions
(Netherlands) Kampong	(England) ~~Surbiton~~ Holcombe	(Netherlands) Rotterdam
(Germany) Mannheim	(Ireland) Three Rock Rovers	(Germany) Rot-Weiss Köln
(Belgium) Dragons	Racing Club de France	(Belgium) Royal Herakles
(Spain) Real Club de Polo	(Russia) Dinamo Kazan	(Spain) Atlètic Terrassa

== Round One ==
All times are local (UTC+01:00)

If a game is won, the winning team receives 5 points. A draw results in both teams receiving 2 points. A loss gives the losing team 1 point unless the losing team loses with more than 3 goals, then they receive 0 points.

The Euro Hockey League trialed a new scoring system for the season 2017–18:

- For every Field Goal and a Penalty Stroke Goal scored in a match NOT resulting from a Penalty Corner = 2 goals
- For every Penalty Corner scored in a match = 1 goal
- For every goal scored from a Penalty Stroke resulting from a Penalty Corner situation = 1 goal
- In a shoot-out competition a goal from a direct Shoot-out and a Penalty Stroke = 1 goal

=== Group A ===
Pos	Team	Pld	W	D	L	GF	GA	GD	Pts
1	(Netherlands) Bloemendaal	2	2	0	0	19	2	+17	10
2	(England) Wimbledon	2	1	0	1	9	4	+5	5
3	(Austria) Arminen	2	0	0	2	2	24	–22	0

6 October 2017
16:15

Bloemendaal (Netherlands)	4–0	(England) Wimbledon
Fuchs 5'; Brinkman 60'	Report

Pau Negre Stadium, Barcelona
Umpires:
Diego Estebanez (ESP)
Michael Dutrieux (BEL)

7 October 2017
14:45

Arminen (Austria)	0–9	(England) Wimbledon
	Report	Kinder 13'; Lewers 29'; Horler 45'; Ball 47'; Brogdon 56'

Pau Negre Stadium, Barcelona
Umpires:
Johannes Berneth (GER)
Grzegorz Rysinski (POL)

8 October 2017
14:00

Bloemendaal (Netherlands)	15–2	(Austria) Arminen
	Report

Pau Negre Stadium, Barcelona

=== Group B ===
Pos	Team	Pld	W	D	L	GF	GA	GD	Pts
1	(Germany) Uhlenhorst Mülheim	2	1	1	0	13	3	+10	7
2	(Russia) Dinamo Elektrostal	2	1	1	0	14	5	+9	7
3	(Wales) Cardiff & Met	2	0	0	2	2	21	–19	0

6 October 2017
11:45

Uhlenhorst Mülheim (Germany)	10–0	(Wales) Cardiff & Met
	Report

Pau Negre Stadium, Barcelona

7 October 2017
10:15

Dinamo Elektrostal (Russia)	11–2	(Wales) Cardiff & Met
	Report

Pau Negre Stadium, Barcelona

8 October 2017
09:30

Uhlenhorst Mülheim (Germany)	3–3	(Russia) Dinamo Elektrostal
	Report

Pau Negre Stadium, Barcelona

=== Group C ===
Pos	Team	Pld	W	D	L	GF	GA	GD	Pts
1	(Belgium) Racing Club de Bruxelles	2	2	0	0	12	4	+8	10
2	(Poland) Grunwald Poznań	2	1	0	1	8	6	+2	5
3	(Ireland) Banbridge	2	0	0	2	2	12	–10	0

6 October 2017
14:00

Racing Club de Bruxelles (Belgium)	6–2	(Poland) Grunwald Poznań
	Report

Pau Negre Stadium, Barcelona

7 October 2017
12:30

Banbridge (Ireland)	0–6	(Poland) Grunwald Poznań
	Report

Pau Negre Stadium, Barcelona

8 October 2017
11:45

Racing Club de Bruxelles (Belgium)	6–2	(Ireland) Banbridge HC
	Report

Pau Negre Stadium, Barcelona

=== Group D ===
Pos	Team	Pld	W	D	L	GF	GA	GD	Pts
1	(France) Saint Germain	2	2	0	0	7	4	+3	10
2	(Spain) Club Egara	2	1	0	1	13	7	+6	6
3	(Scotland) Kelburne	2	0	0	2	1	10	–9	1

6 October 2017
18:30

Club Egara (Spain)	9–1	(Scotland) Kelburne
	Report

Pau Negre Stadium, Barcelona

7 October 2017
17:00

Saint Germain (France)	1–0	(Scotland) Kelburne
	Report

Pau Negre Stadium, Barcelona

8 October 2017
16:15

Club Egara (Spain)	4–6	(France) Saint Germain
	Report

Pau Negre Stadium, Barcelona

== Knockout stage ==
Round of 16 and the quarter-finals were played in Rotterdam, Netherlands between the 30th of March and the 2nd of April 2018. The semi-finals, third place match and the final will be played in Bloemendaal, Netherlands.

=== Bracket ===
Round of 16
30 March 2018
(Belgium) Racing Club de Bruxelles	9
(Russia) Dinamo Kazan	0
30 March 2018
(Netherlands) Kampong	1
(Germany) Rot-Weiss Köln	0
30 March 2018
(England) Holcombe	4
(Spain) Real Club de Polo	7
30 March 2018
(Belgium) Herakles	4
(Spain) Atlètic Terrassa	2
31 March 2018
(Belgium) Dragons	0
(Netherlands) Bloemendaal	8
31 March 2018
(France) Saint Germain	3
(Ireland) Three Rock Rovers	2
31 March 2018
Racing Club de France	0
(Germany) Uhlenhorst Mülheim	3
31 March 2018
(Netherlands) Rotterdam (p.s.o.)	4 (5)
(Germany) Mannheimer HC	4 (4)

Quarter-finals
1 April 2018
(Belgium) Racing Club de Bruxelles	1
(Netherlands) Kampong	4
1 April 2018
(Spain) Real Club de Polo	1 (6)
(Belgium) Herakles (p.s.o.)	1 (7)
2 April 2018
(Netherlands) Bloemendaal	8
(France) Saint Germain	0
2 April 2018
(Germany) Uhlenhorst Mülheim	1
(Netherlands) Rotterdam	13

Semi-finals
26 May 2018
(Netherlands) Kampong	6
(Belgium) Herakles	2
26 May 2018
(Netherlands) Bloemendaal	6
(Netherlands) Rotterdam	0

Final
27 May 2018
(Netherlands) Kampong	2
(Netherlands) Bloemendaal	8
Third place
27 May 2018
(Belgium) Herakles	4
(Netherlands) Rotterdam	5

=== Round of 16 ===
30 March 2018
13:15

Holcombe (England)	4–7	(Spain) Real Club de Polo
Bandurak 15', 60'	Report	Plennevaux 18'; Llorens 30'; Ortiz 48'; Casasayas 50'

Hazelaarweg Stadion, Rotterdam
Umpires:
Ben Göntgen (GER)
Michael Pontus (BEL)

30 March 2018
15:30

Herakles (Belgium)	4–2	(Spain) Atlètic Terrassa
Smith 2'; Hottlet 43'	Report	Oliva 3', 45'

Hazelaarweg Stadion, Rotterdam
Umpires:
Jakub Mejzlik (CZE)
Paul van den Assum (NED)

30 March 2018
17:45

Racing Club de Bruxelles (Belgium)	9–0	(Russia) Dinamo Kazan
Boon 14'; Truyens 15'; Harte 22'; Willems 25'; Garcia 47'	Report

Hazelaarweg Stadion, Rotterdam
Umpires:
Francisco Vazquez Lopez (ESP)
Malcolm Coombes (IRL)

30 March 2018
20:00

Kampong (Netherlands)	1–0	(Germany) Rot-Weiss Köln
Phijffer 23'	Report

Hazelaarweg Stadion, Rotterdam
Umpires:
Marcin Grochal (POL)
Dan Barstow (ENG)

31 March 2018
11:30

Saint Germain (France)	3–2	(Ireland) Three Rock Rovers
M. Genestet 23'; Goyet 34'	Report	Morris 30'

Hazelaarweg Stadion, Rotterdam
Umpires:
Jakub Mejzlik (CZE)
Ian Diamond (SCO)

31 March 2018
13:45

Racing Club de France	0–3	(Germany) Uhlenhorst Mülheim
	Report	Windfeder 14'; Ho-Garcia 44'

Hazelaarweg Stadion, Rotterdam
Umpires:
Marcin Grochal (POL)
Paul van den Assum (NED)

31 March 2018
16:00

Rotterdam (Netherlands)	4–4	(Germany) Mannheim
Hoedemakers 53'; Catlin 59'	Report	Haase 11'; Vila 25'
Penalties
Hertzberger (penalty shoot-out scored) van Ass (penalty shoot-out scored) van Dam (penalty shoot-out scored); Polkamp (penalty shoot-out missed); Beltraan (penalty shoot-out scored); Hertzberger (penalty shoot-out scored)	5–4	(penalty shoot-out scored) Fischer; (penalty shoot-out scored) Harris; (penalty shoot-out scored) Barreiros; (penalty shoot-out scored) Peillat; (penalty shoot-out missed) Zmyslony; (penalty shoot-out missed) Barreiros

Hazelaarweg Stadion, Rotterdam
Umpires:
Francisco Vazquez Lopez (ESP)
Michael Pontus (BEL)

31 March 2018
18:15

Dragons (Belgium)	0–8	(Netherlands) Bloemendaal
	Report	Dwyer 16'; Bovendeert 24', 39', 41'

Hazelaarweg Stadion, Rotterdam
Umpires:
Ben Göntgen (GER)
Dan Barstow (ENG)

=== Ranking matches ===
1 April 2018
10:30

Holcombe (England)	4–8	(Spain) Atlètic Terrassa
Bandurak 7', 14'	Report	Salles 1'; Oliva 12'; Malgosa 16'; Tarrés 53'

Hazelaarweg Stadion, Rotterdam
Umpires:
Michael Pontus (BEL)
Malcolm Coombes (IRL)

1 April 2018
12:45

Rot-Weiss Köln (Germany)	8–10	(Russia) Dinamo Kazan
T. Grambusch 3', 28', 52'; Miltkau 46'; M. Grambusch 57'	Report	Shchipachev 15'; Fattakhov 20'; Golubev 42'; Komarov 48', 56'

Hazelaarweg Stadion, Rotterdam
Umpires:
Ian Diamond (SCO)
Dan Barstow (ENG)

2 April 2018
09:15

Dragons (Belgium)	20–10	(Ireland) Three Rock Rovers
Thys 9'; Van Doren 17'; Hendrickx 24', 47'; Luyten 25'; Raes 26'; Van Aubel 32', 53'; Denayer 33', 54'; Rubens 38'; Stockbroekx 45'	Report	J. Mullins 48'; Morris 48'; K. Mullins 57'; Walsh 57'; Hosking 59'

Hazelaarweg Stadion, Rotterdam
Umpires:
Ben Göntgen (GER)
Ian Diamond (SCO)

2 April 2018
11:30

Racing Club de France	0–7	(Germany) Mannheim
	Report	D. Nguyen 3'; Haase 9'; T. Nguyen 37'; Harris 42'

Hazelaarweg Stadion, Rotterdam
Umpires:
Malcolm Coombes (IRL)
Paul van den Assum (NED)

=== Quarter-finals ===
1 April 2018
15:00

Real Club de Polo (Spain)	1–1	(Belgium) Herakles
Llorens 31'	Report	Keusters 40'
Penalties
Casasayas (penalty shoot-out scored); Plennevaux (penalty shoot-out scored); Plennevaux (penalty shoot-out missed); Piera (penalty shoot-out scored); Rey (penalty shoot-out scored); Rey (penalty shoot-out scored); Alegre (penalty shoot-out scored); Piera (penalty shoot-out missed)	6–7	(penalty shoot-out scored) Sanz; (penalty shoot-out scored) Keusters; (penalty shoot-out scored) De Kerpel; (penalty shoot-out scored) Haig; (penalty shoot-out missed) De Kerpel; (penalty shoot-out scored) Sanz; (penalty shoot-out scored) Keusters; (penalty shoot-out scored) De Kerpel

Hazelaarweg Stadion, Rotterdam
Umpires:
Ben Göntgen (GER)
Paul van den Assum (NED)

1 April 2018
17:15

Racing Club de Bruxelles (Belgium)	1–4	(Netherlands) Kampong
Harte 13'	Report	Caspers 9'; Kellerman 28'

Hazelaarweg Stadion, Rotterdam
Umpires:
Francisco Vazquez Lopez (ESP)
Marcin Grochal (POL)

2 April 2018
13:45

Bloemendaal (Netherlands)	8–0	(France) Saint Germain
Fuchs 19'; Bovendeert 24', 49'; Dwyer 44'	Report

Hazelaarweg Stadion, Rotterdam
Umpires:
Michael Pontus (BEL)
Marcin Grochal (POL)

2 April 2018
16:00

Uhlenhorst Mülheim (Germany)	1–13	(Netherlands) Rotterdam
Windfeder 5'	Report	Hertzberger 6'; Hoedemakers 10', 24' van Ass 21', 29', 48'; Catlin 54' van Dam 57'

Hazelaarweg Stadion, Rotterdam
Umpires:
Dan Barstow (ENG)
Francisco Vazquez Lopez (ESP)

=== Semi-finals ===
26 May 2018
13:30

Kampong (Netherlands)	6–2	(Belgium) Herakles
Kemperman 3'; Jonker 9'; Kellerman 48'	Report	De Kerpel 37'

Sportpark 't Kopje, Bloemendaal
Umpires:
Christian Blasch (GER)
Dan Barstow (ENG)

26 May 2018
16:00

Bloemendaal (Netherlands)	6–0	(Netherlands) Rotterdam
Dwyer 22'; Fuchs 36'; Brinkman 60'	Report

Sportpark 't Kopje, Bloemendaal
Umpires:
Martin Madden (SCO)
Marcin Grochal (POL)

=== Third place ===
27 May 2018
13:30

Herakles (Belgium)	4–5	(Netherlands) Rotterdam
Sanz 4', 50'	Report	Hoedemakers 42'; Hertzberger 46'; Van Dam 59'

Sportpark 't Kopje, Bloemendaal
Umpires:
Christian Blasch (GER)
Martin Madden (SCO)

=== Final ===
27 May 2018
16:00

Kampong (Netherlands)	2–8	(Netherlands) Bloemendaal
Jonker 30'	Report	Lleonart 40'; Bovendeert 43'; Brinkman 58'; Dwyer 60'

Sportpark 't Kopje, Bloemendaal
Umpires:
Francisco Vázquez López (ESP)
Marcin Grochal (POL)

== See also ==
- 2018 EuroHockey Club Champions Cup
