= 2018 Men's Hockey World Cup final =

2018 Men's Hockey World Cup Final
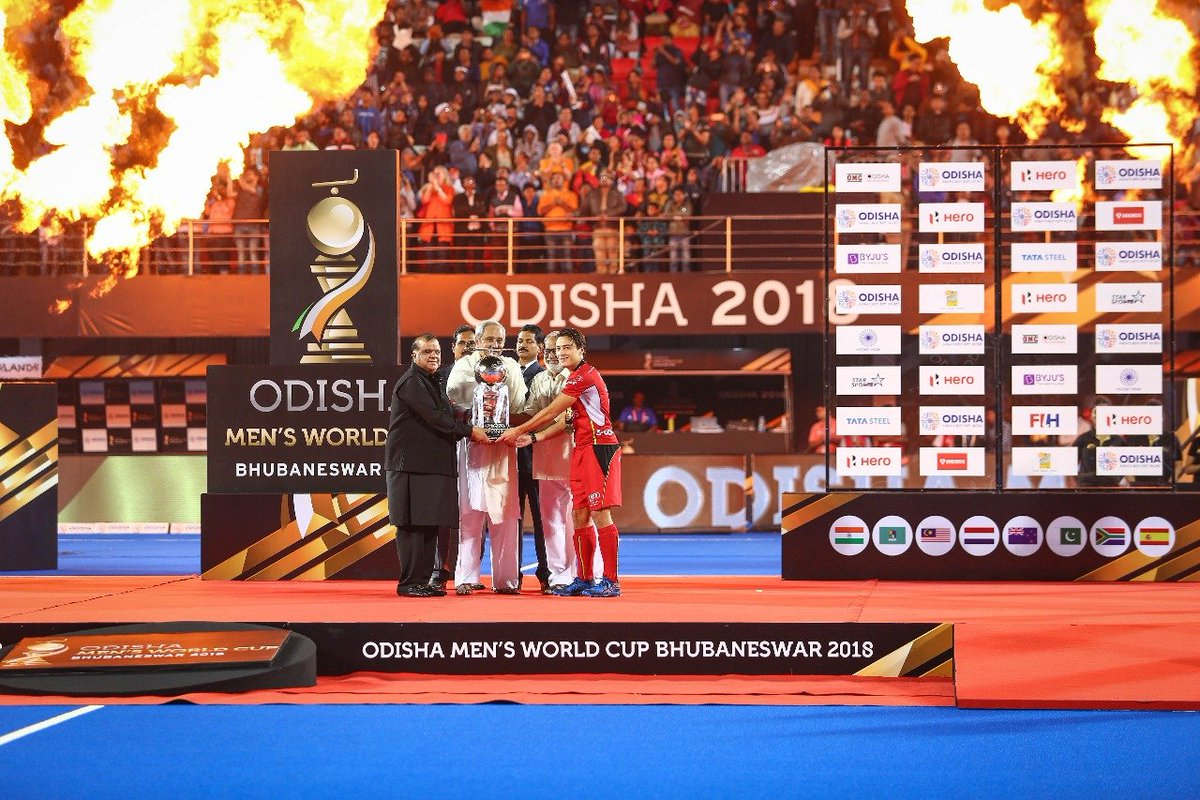
- Thomas Briels Lifting 2018 Men's Hockey World Cup Trophy
- Event: 2018 Men's Hockey World Cup
Belgium	Netherlands
(Belgium)	(Netherlands)
0	0
- Belgium won 3–2 on penalty shoot-out
- Date: 16 December 2018
- Venue: Kalinga Stadium, Bhubaneswar
- Man of the Match: Vincent Vanasch (Belgium)
- Referee: Adam Kearns (Australia); Marcin Grochal (Poland)
- Attendance: 16,000

The 2018 Men's Hockey World Cup Final was a field hockey match played between Belgium and the Netherlands on 16 December 2018 at the Kalinga Stadium in Bhubaneswar, India.

Belgium won their first World Cup after defeating the Netherlands in the Final in penalty shoot-out. This was also Belgium's first ever world title in a team sport. Belgian goalkeeper Vincent Vanasch was named player of the match in the Final.

== Route to the final ==
Belgium
Round
Netherlands
Opponent
Result
Pool stage
Opponent
Result
Canada
2–1
Match 1
Malaysia
7–0
India
2–2
Match 2
Germany
1–4
South Africa
5–1
Match 3
Pakistan
5–1

Pos	Team	Pld	Pts
1	India	3	7
2	Belgium	3	7
3	Canada	3	1
4	South Africa	3	1

Source: FIH
Final standing

Pos	Team	Pld	Pts
1	Germany	3	9
2	Netherlands	3	6
3	Pakistan	3	1
4	Malaysia	3	1

Source: FIH
Opponent
Result
Knockout stage
Opponent
Result
Pakistan
5–0
Cross-over
Canada
5–0
Germany
2–1
Quarter-finals
India
2–1
England
6–0
Semi-finals
Australia
2–2 (4–3 p.s.o.)

=== Belgium ===
Belgium entered the World Cup as one of the favorites and ranked third in the FIH World Rankings. They had enjoyed success in major tournaments in the preceding years, winning silver medals at the 2016 Summer Olympics and the 2017 EuroHockey Nations Championship.

At the World Cup, Belgium were drawn in Pool C alongside Canada, hosts India and South Africa. Belgium began the tournament with a 2–1 win over Canada through field goals by Félix Denayer and Thomas Briels. In their second pool match, they secured a 2–2 draw against India with a 56th-minute equalizer by Simon Gougnard. They came back from behind in their final group match against South Africa to post a 5–1 victory through goals by Alexander Hendrickx, Gougnard, Loïck Luypaert and Cédric Charlier. They finished second in the group with seven points, as India, who finished on the same number of points, had a better goal difference.

Belgium defeated Pakistan 5–0 in the cross-over with Hendrickx, Briels, Charlier, Sébastien Dockier and Tom Boon scoring. In the quarterfinal against Germany, Belgium came back from being 0–1 down after the first quarter to winning 2–1, with an 18th-minute goal by Hendrickx from a penalty corner and a field goal by Boon in the 50th minute. They faced England in the semifinal who had knocked out Olympic gold medalists and second-ranked team in the world Argentina in the quarterfinal. Belgium dominated the semifinal, shutting out England 6–0 as Boon, Gougnard, Charlier, Hendrickx and Dockier scored for the Red Lions. Belgium thus entered their first ever World Cup final.

=== Netherlands ===
Ranked fourth in the world, the Netherlands were tipped prior to the World Cup as one of the contenders to win the tournament. The Dutch had finished runners-up at the 2014 World Cup and won the 2017 EuroHockey Nations Championship.

The Netherlands were placed in Pool D with Germany, Malaysia and Pakistan. They recorded a 7–0 win over Malaysia in the opening match, with the help of Jeroen Hertzberger's hat-trick. In the second game, the Dutch were leading Germany 1–0 until the 30th minute, before Germans scored four times, including thrice in the last quarter, to beat the Dutch 4–1. The Netherlands defeated Pakistan 5–1 in their final pool match, with goals from Thierry Brinkman, Valentin Verga, Bob de Voogd, Jorrit Croon and Mink van der Weerden.

The Dutch cruised into the quarterfinals with a 5–0 win over Canada in the cross-over. Facing the home team India in the quarterfinal, the Netherlands conceded a goal in the 12th minute but equalized three minutes later with a Brinkman field goal. Defender van der Weerden converted a penalty corner in the fourth quarter to seal a 2–1 victory for his team. The Dutch faced defending champions and world number one Australia in the semifinal. The Dutch took an early lead in the match as Glenn Schuurman netted one in the ninth minute and Seve van Ass doubled the lead with a goal in the second quarter. Australia pulled one goal back in the final minute of the third quarter before scoring the equalizer in the final minute of the fourth to push the game into penalty shoot-out. The Netherlands won the shootout 4–3 in sudden death, after the teams were level 3–3 from five strokes each.

== Match ==
=== Summary ===
Belgium began the first quarter with Simon Gougnard having a shot at the goal in the second minute but the ball went just wide. Six minutes later Dutchman Jeroen Hertzberger successfully entered the Belgian circle, creating the first chance for his team, but shot well wide of the goal. The quarter ended with the game "evenly poised" as Belgium marginally led possession at 51%. Belgium continued to attack at the start of the second quarter but were intercepted twice in the 18th minute by Mirco Pruyser and Hertzberger. In the 26th minute, Thierry Brinkman stopped an attack by Belgian forward Cedric Charlier in the circle. The Dutch then pressed forward and won the first penalty corner of the match in the 28th minute but Hertzberger's shot was deflected away by Florent van Aubel. A minute later Belgium lost their referral after an unsuccessful appeal against a penalty corner that was awarded to the Netherlands. However, Mink van der Weerden was fouled for swinging his stick too high as another chance for the Dutch went in vain.

Two minutes into the second half, Dutch goalkeeper Pirmin Blaak made a diving save at a Thomas Briels' shot. Sebastien Dockier then took a shot in the 39th minute but it went wide across the goalpost. Belgian goalkeeper Vincent Vanasch made a comfortable save in the 49th minute, before a tackle by Nicolas De Kerpel in the circle denied the Dutch a chance at having another shot at the goal. Dutch midfielder Jonas de Geus picked up a green card in the 57th minute, leaving the Netherlands down to ten players for the subsequent two minutes. Neither team could break the 0–0 deadlock before the full time hooter and the match entered the penalty shoot-out stage.

The Dutch started well in the penalty shoot-out, securing a 2–1 lead after three shots each. After Seve van Ass missed the fourth try for the Netherlands, Belgium equalized through Victor Wegnez. Thijs van Dam failed to score for the Netherlands in their final shot thanks to a tackle by Vanasch. Belgium then had their goal overturned off their fifth try, as Blaak used the video referral upon noticing that the ball had bounced off Arthur De Sloover's foot just before the shot. With the score still tied at 2–2, the match headed to sudden death penalty shoot-out.

Belgium went first in the sudden death and scored through van Aubel. The Netherlands used their referral again appealing for obstruction but the video umpire ruled in favor of Belgium. Hertzberger, needing to score to keep the Netherlands alive, was forced wide by Vanasch and missed his shot, giving Belgium a 3–2 victory and their maiden World Cup title.

=== Details ===
16 December 2018
19:00

Belgium	0–0	Netherlands
	Report
Penalties
Van Doren (penalty shoot-out missed); Denayer (penalty shoot-out missed); Van Aubel (penalty shoot-out scored); Wegnez (penalty shoot-out scored); De Sloover (penalty shoot-out missed); Van Aubel (penalty shoot-out scored)	3–2	(penalty shoot-out scored) Hertzberger; (penalty shoot-out missed) Pruyser; (penalty shoot-out scored) De Geus; (penalty shoot-out missed) Van Ass; (penalty shoot-out missed) Van Dam; (penalty shoot-out missed) Hertzberger

Umpires:
Adam Kearns (AUS)
Marcin Grochal (POL)

GK	21	Vincent Vanasch
DF	12	Gauthier Boccard
DF	25	Loïck Luypaert
DF	4	Arthur van Doren
DF	23	Arthur De Sloover
MF	22	Simon Gougnard
MF	26	Victor Wegnez
MF	19	Félix Denayer
FW	17	Thomas Briels (c)
FW	27	Tom Boon
FW	8	Florent van Aubel
Substitutions:
FW	9	Sébastien Dockier	(substituted on) 3'
FW	10	Cédric Charlier	(substituted on) 3'
MF	14	Augustin Meurmans	(substituted on) 3'
FW	13	Nicolas De Kerpel	(substituted on) 4'
DF	16	Alexander Hendrickx	(substituted on) 5'
FW	24	Antoine Kina	(substituted on) 7'
Coach:
Shane McLeod

GK	26	Pirmin Blaak
DF	30	Mink van der Weerden
DF	13	Sander Baart
DF	4	Lars Balk
DF	11	Glenn Schuurman
MF	10	Valentin Verga
MF	8	Billy Bakker (c)
MF	14	Robbert Kemperman
FW	2	Jeroen Hertzberger
FW	16	Mirco Pruyser
FW	25	Thierry Brinkman
Substitutions:
FW	18	Bob de Voogd		(substituted on) 2'
MF	20	Jorrit Croon		(substituted on) 2'
FW	5	Thijs van Dam		(substituted on) 4'
MF	9	Seve van Ass		(substituted on) 4'
DF	23	Joep de Mol		(substituted on) 4'
MF	6	Jonas de Geus	57'	(substituted on) 5'
Coach:
Max Caldas

=== Aftermath ===
Vanasch won the player of the match for his four saves in the penalty shoot-out. Defender Arthur van Doren was named the player of the tournament. At the conclusion of the match, Belgium displaced Australia as the top-ranked men's team in the FIH World Rankings, while the Netherlands moved up one place to third.

On 18 December, the Belgian team was welcomed home by thousands of fans at the Grand-Place in Brussels. Among those who were present at the celebrations were Queen Mathilde and King Philippe.
