= Simon Gougnard =

Belgian field hockey player

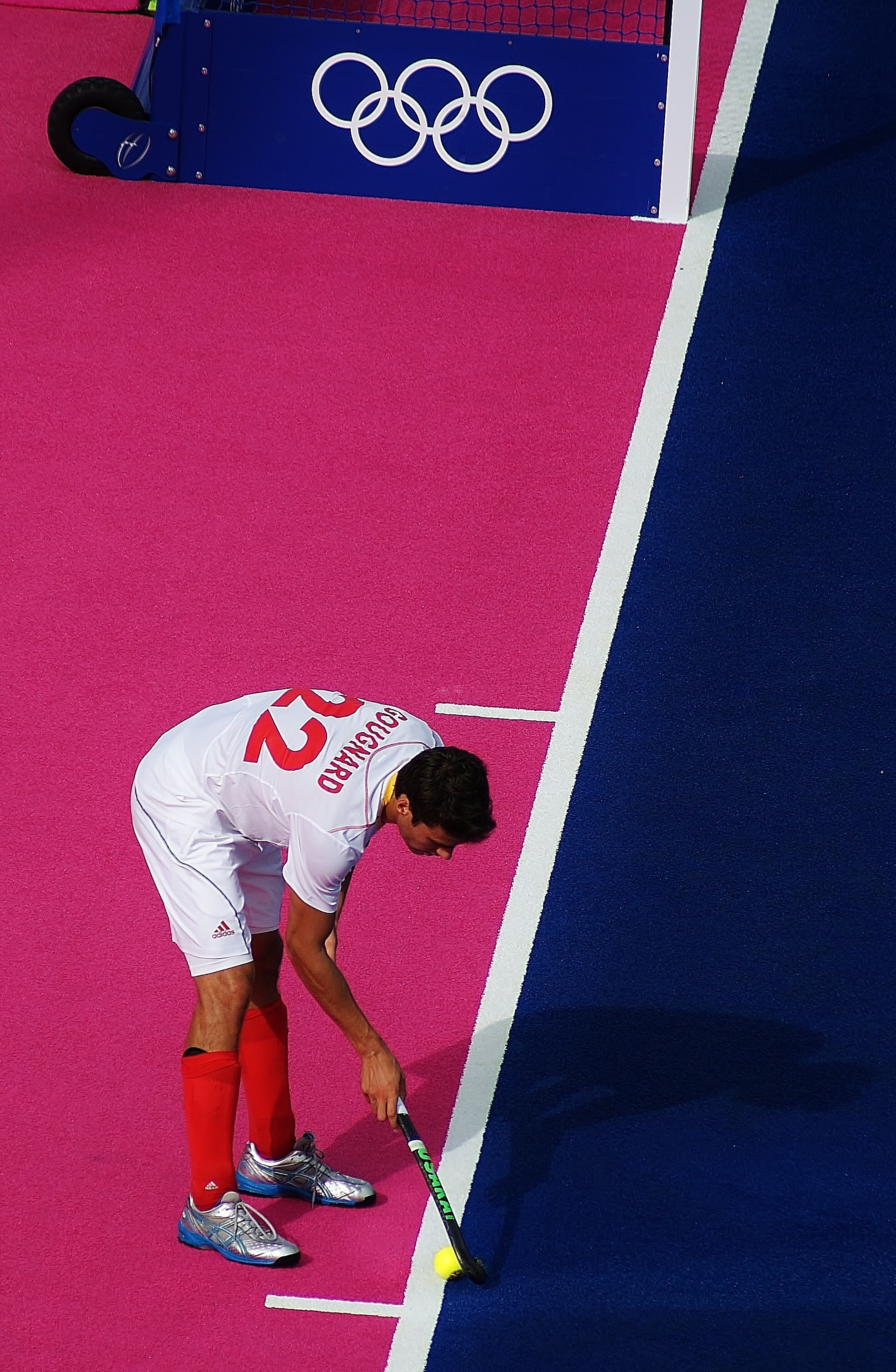
- Gougnard at the 2012 Summer Olympics

Personal information
- Full name: Simon Pierre F. Gougnard
- Born: 17 January 1991 (age 35) Nivelles, Belgium
- Height: 1.87 m (6 ft 2 in)
- Weight: 84 kg (185 lb)

Sport
- Sport: Field hockey
- Position: Midfielder
- Club: Racing
Youth career
- Team
- –: Pingouin
Senior career
Years	Team	Caps	Goals
–2009	Waterloo Ducks	-	-
2009–2010	Tilburg	-	-
2010–2012	Oranje Zwart	-	-
2012–2013	Racing	-	-
2013–2015	Bloemendaal	-	-
2015–2017	Racing	-	-
2017–2019	Waterloo Ducks	-	-
2019–2021	Leuven	-	-
2021–2023	Dragons	-	-
2023–present	Racing	-	-
National team
Years	Team	Caps	Goals
2007–present	Belgium	322	(26)
Medal record
Men's field hockey
Representing Belgium
Olympic Games
Gold medal – first place	2020 Tokyo	Team
Silver medal – second place	2016 Rio de Janeiro	Team
World Cup
Gold medal – first place	2018 Bhubaneswar
Silver medal – second place	2023 Bhubaneswar–Rourkela
EuroHockey Championship
Gold medal – first place	2019 Antwerp
Silver medal – second place	2013 Boom
Silver medal – second place	2017 Amstelveen
Bronze medal – third place	2021 Amstelveen
Hockey World League
Silver medal – second place	2014–15 Raipur	Team
EuroHockey Junior Championship
Silver medal – second place	2010 Siemianowice Śląskie
- Updated on 19 May 2023

Simon Pierre F. Gougnard (born 17 January 1991) is a Belgian professional field hockey player who plays as a midfielder for Racing and the Belgium national team.

== Club career ==
Gougnard played club hockey in Belgium for the Waterloo Ducks until 2009, when he transferred to the Netherlands to play for TMHC Tilburg. He left them after one season to play for Oranje Zwart. In 2012, he returned to Belgium because of his study. He played in Belgium for Racing Bruxelles.

In 2013, Gougnard went back to the Netherlands, where he signed a two-year contract for Bloemendaal. He played for Bloemendaal until 2015, when he returned to Racing Bruxelles. In 2017, he went back to the Waterloo Ducks. In April 2019, he agreed to play for Leuven from the 2019–20 season onwards. During that year's Euro Hockey League, Gougnard's Waterloo Ducks became the first Belgian club to win the Euro Hockey League. After two seasons, he left Leuven for Dragons in 2021. In May 2023 it was announced he would return to Racing for the second time.

== International career ==
At the 2012 Summer Olympics, he competed for the national team in the men's tournament. Gougnard became European vice-champion with Belgium at the 2013 European Championship on home ground in Boom. During the 2018 World Cup, he lost his father and in the match on the next day against England, Belgium played with a mourning band. Gougnard scored the 2–0 in that match and eventually they won the tournament by defeating the Netherlands in the final. In August 2019, he was selected in the Belgium squad for the 2019 EuroHockey Championship. They won Belgium its first European title by defeating Spain 5–0 in the final. On 25 May 2021, he was selected in the squad for the 2021 EuroHockey Championship. In the summer from 2023 he took a break from the national team because he feels he has not got the energy to perform at the highest level.

== Honours ==
=== Club ===
Waterloo Ducks

- Euro Hockey League: 2018–19
- Belgian Hockey League: 2008–09

=== International ===
Belgium

- Olympic gold medal: 2020
- Olympic silver medal: 2016
- World Cup: 2018
- EuroHockey Championship: 2019
- FIH Pro League: 2020–21
