= 2018 Men's Hockey World Cup =

Field hockey competition held in Bhubaneswar, India

Tournament details
- Host country: India
- City: Bhubaneswar
- Dates: 28 November – 16 December
- Teams: 16 (from 5 confederations)
- Venue: Kalinga Hockey Stadium

Final positions
- Champions: Belgium (1st title)
- Runner-up: Netherlands
- Third place: Australia

Tournament statistics
- Matches played: 36
- Goals scored: 157 (4.36 per match)
- Top scorer(s): (Australia) Blake Govers (Belgium) Alexander Hendrickx (7 goals)
- Best player: (Belgium) Arthur Van Doren

The 2018 Men's Hockey World Cup was the 14th edition of the Hockey World Cup, the quadrennial world championship for men's national field hockey teams organized by the FIH. It was held from 28 November to 16 December 2018, at the Kalinga Hockey Stadium in Bhubaneswar, Odisha, India. The inauguration ceremony which was held on 27 November 2018, witnessed the biggest ever drone flying show in India.

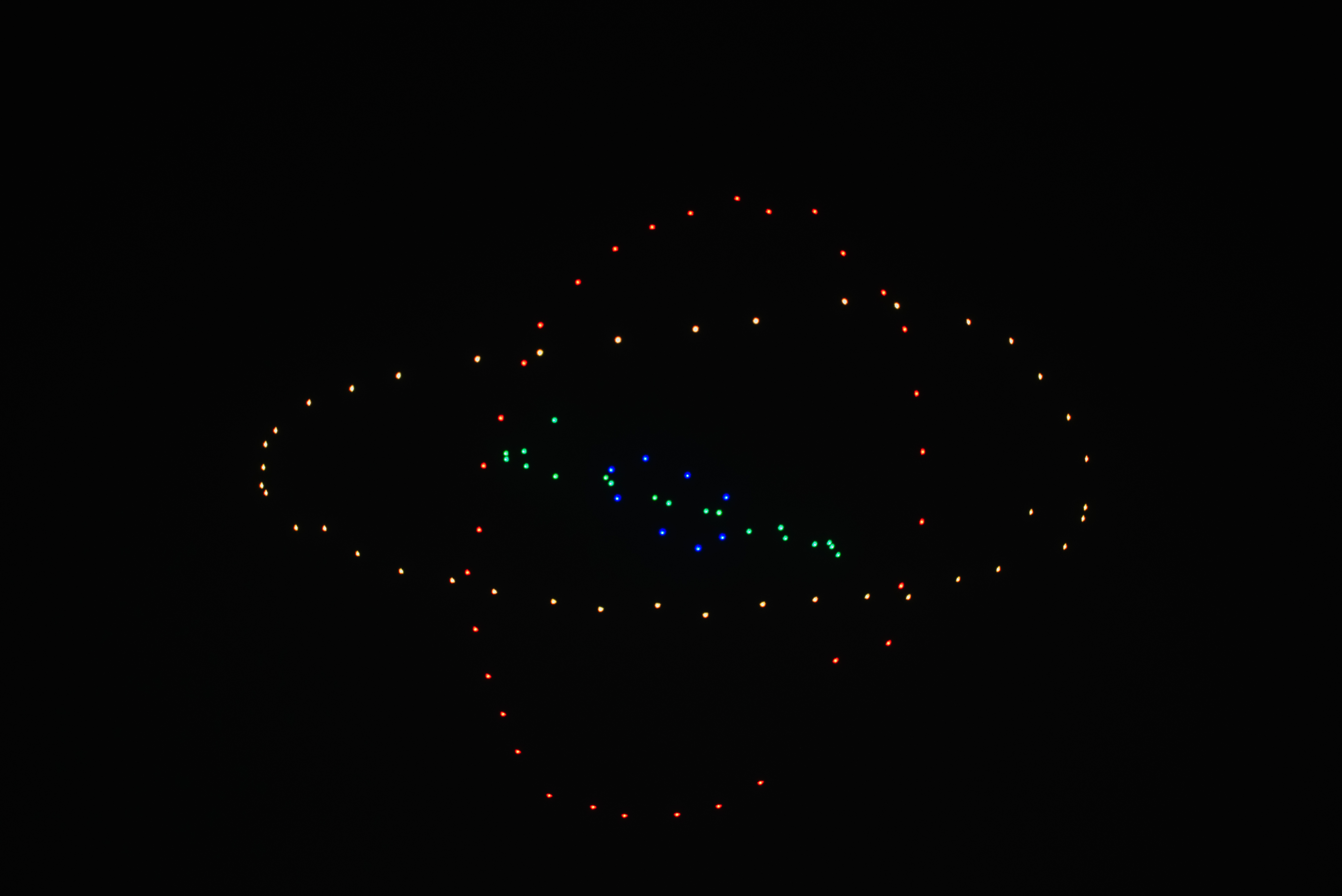
Drone Show in the opening Ceremony Hockey World Cup 2018

Belgium won the tournament for the first time after defeating the Netherlands 3–2 in the final on a penalty shoot-out after a 0–0 draw. Defending champions Australia won the third place match by defeating England 8–1 in the third place playoff of the Odisha men's hockey world cup 2018.

== Bidding ==
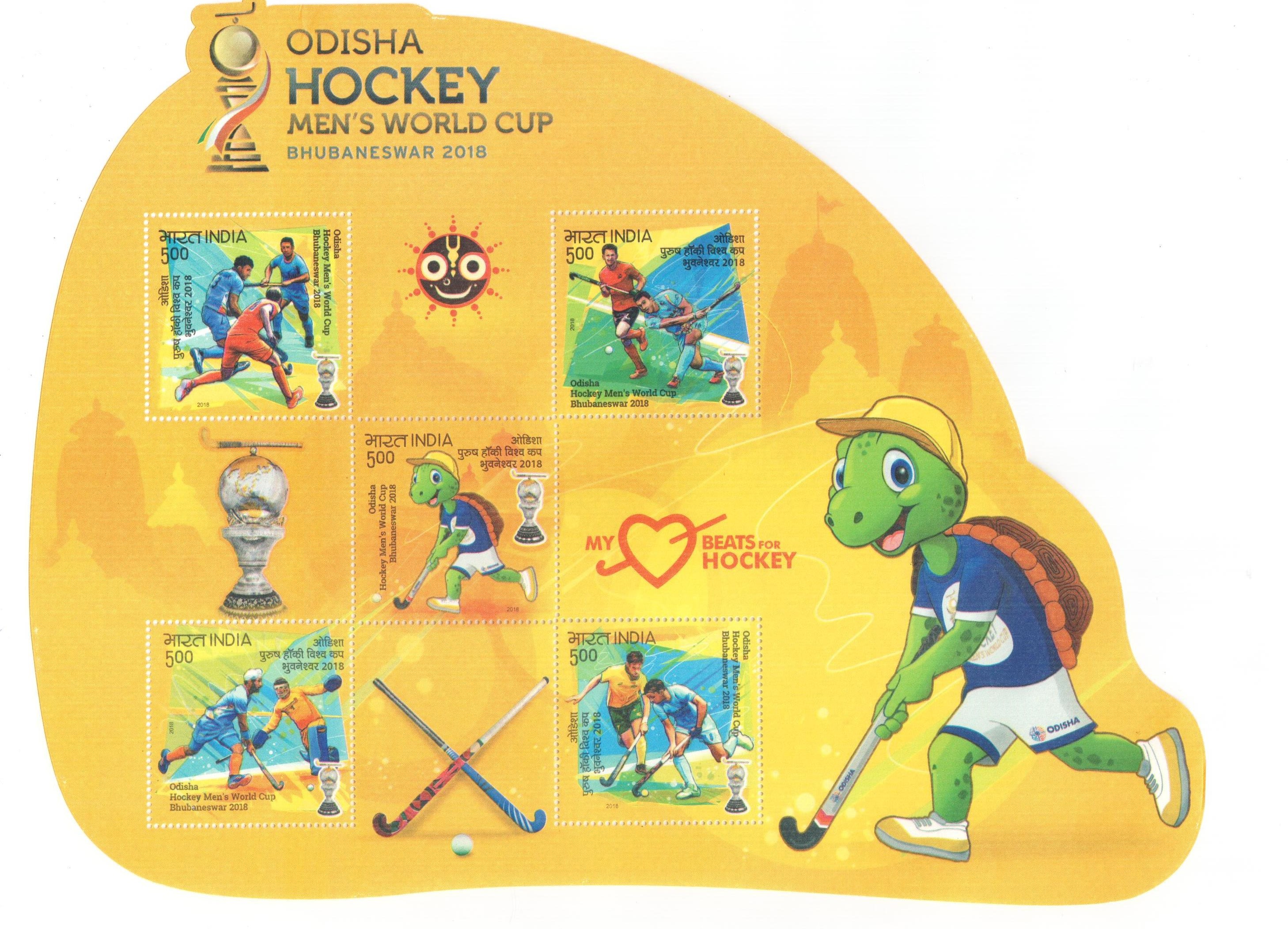
A miniature sheet and stamp of Odisha Men's Hockey World Cup 2018 Bhubaneswar.

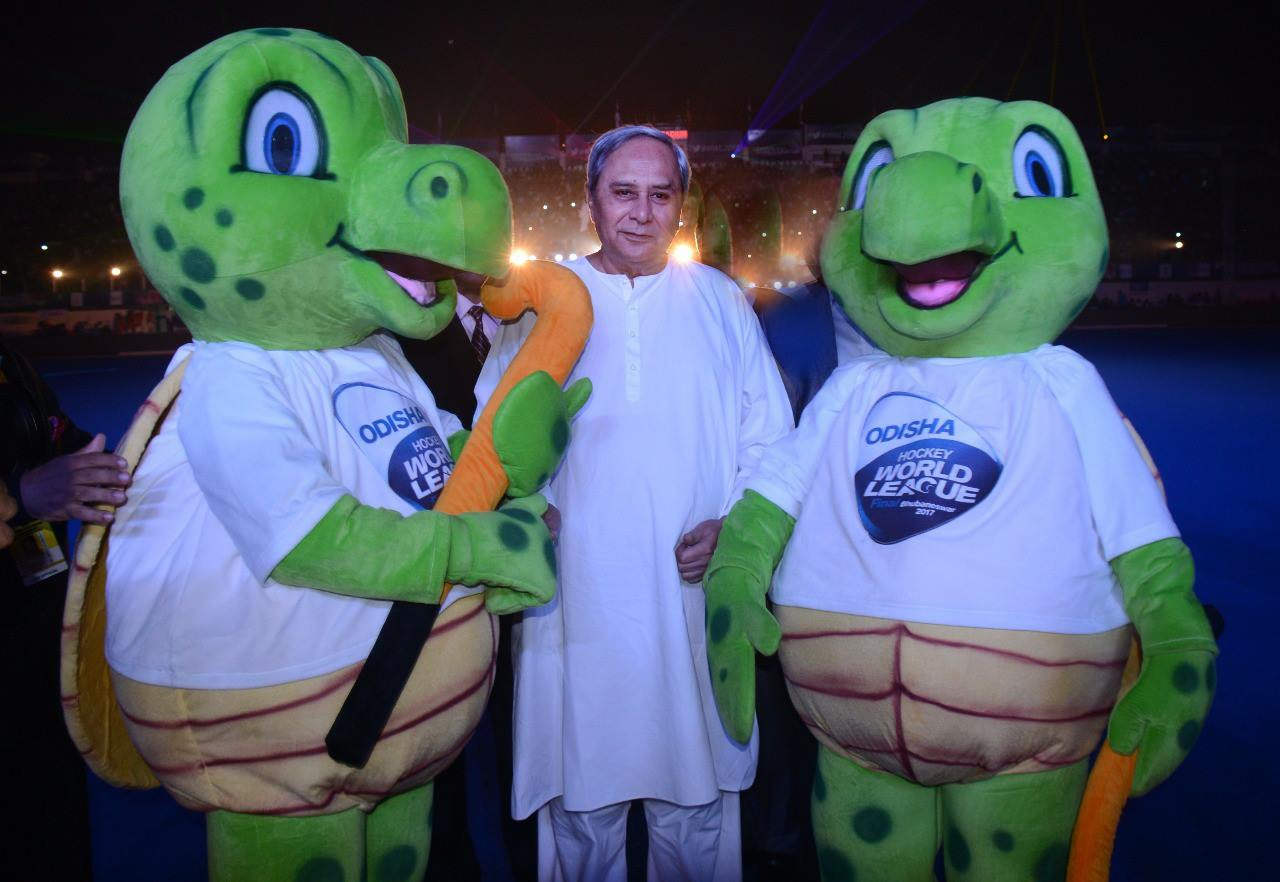
Olly: Mascot of the 2018 hockey World Cup with Odisha Chief Minister Naveen Patnaik

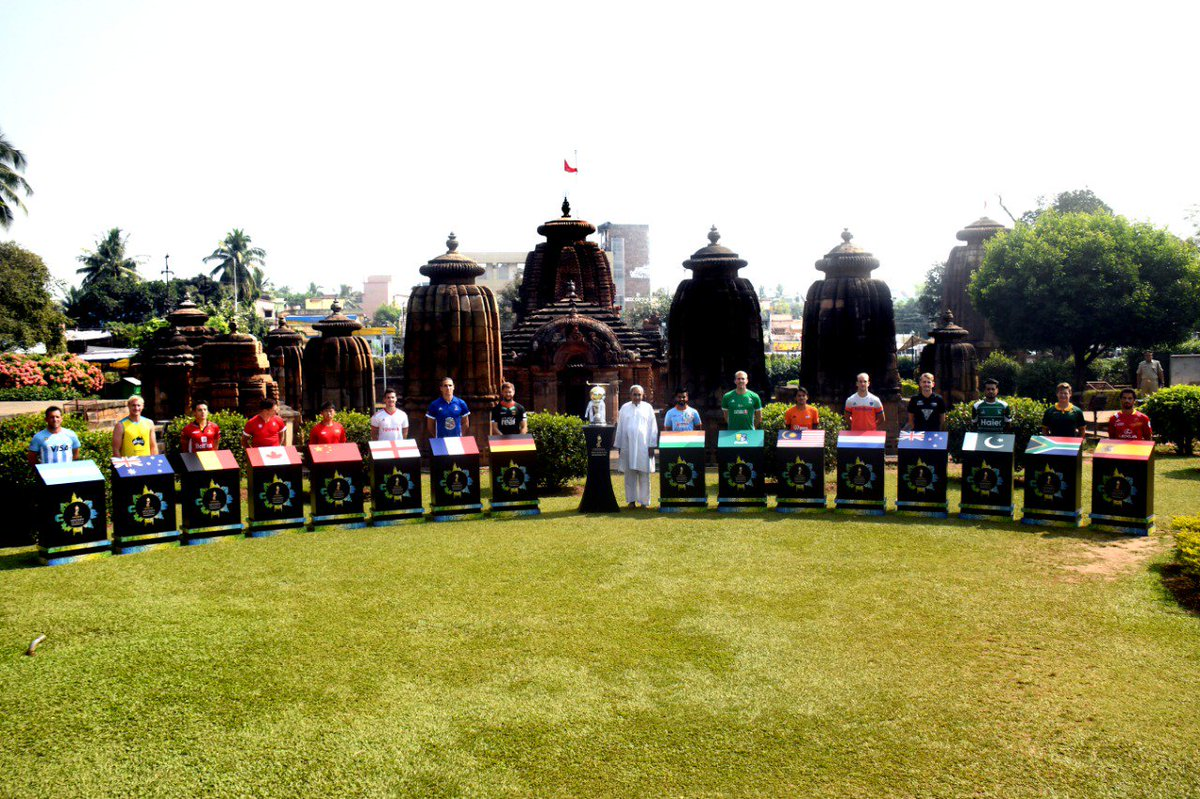
FIH 2018 Captains with Chief Minister of Odisha at Bhubaneswar

In March 2013, one month after the FIH published the event assignment process document for the 2014–2018 cycle, Australia, Belgium, India, Malaysia and New Zealand were shortlisted as candidates for hosting the event and were asked to submit bidding documentation, a requirement that Belgium did not meet. In addition, one month before the host election, Australia withdrew their application due to technical and financial reasons. India was announced as host on 7 November 2013, during a special ceremony in Lausanne, Switzerland.

== Qualification ==
Due to the increase to 16 participating teams, the new qualification process was announced in July 2015 by the International Hockey Federation. Each of the continental champions from five confederations and the host nation received an automatic berth, and the 10/11 highest placed teams at the Semifinals of the 2016–17 FIH Hockey World League not already qualified would enter the tournament. The following sixteen teams shown with final pre-tournament rankings, competed in this tournament.

Dates	Event	Location	Quotas	Qualifier(s)
7 November 2013	Host nation		1	India (5)
15–25 June 2017	2016–17 Hockey World League Semifinals	London, England	5	England (7); Malaysia (12); Canada (11); Pakistan (13); China (17) (debut)
8–23 July 2017	2016–17 Hockey World League Semifinals	Johannesburg, South Africa	6	Belgium (3); Germany (6); New Zealand (8); Spain (9); Ireland (10); France (16)
4–12 August 2017	2017 Pan American Cup	Lancaster, United States	1	Argentina (2)
19–27 August 2017	2017 EuroHockey Championship	Amstelveen, Netherlands	1	Netherlands (4)
11–15 October 2017	2017 Oceania Cup	Sydney, Australia	1	Australia (1)
11–22 October 2017	2017 Asia Cup	Dhaka, Bangladesh	0	—^{1}
22–29 October 2017	2017 Africa Cup of Nations	Ismailia, Egypt	1	South Africa (15)
Total			16	

^1 – India qualified both as host and continental champion, therefore that quota was given to China as the highest-ranked team from the 2016–17 Hockey World League Semifinals not already qualified.

== Format ==
The 16 teams were drawn into four groups, each containing four teams. Each team played each other team in its group once. The first-placed team in each group advanced to the quarter-finals, while the second- and third-placed teams in each group went into the crossover matches. From there on a single-elimination tournament was played.

== Umpires ==
16 umpires were appointed by the FIH for this tournament.

- Diego Barbas (ARG)
- Dan Barstow (ENG)
- Marcin Grochal (POL)
- Ben Göntgen (GER)
- Adam Kearns (AUS)
- Eric Kim Lai Koh (MAS)
- Lim Hong Zhen (SGP)
- Martin Madden (SCO)
- Raghu Prasad (IND)
- Javed Shaikh (IND)
- Simon Taylor (NZL)
- David Tomlinson (NZL)
- Gregory Uyttenhove (BEL)
- Jonas van't Hek (NED)
- Francisco Vásquez (ESP)
- Peter Wright (RSA)

== Opening ceremony ==
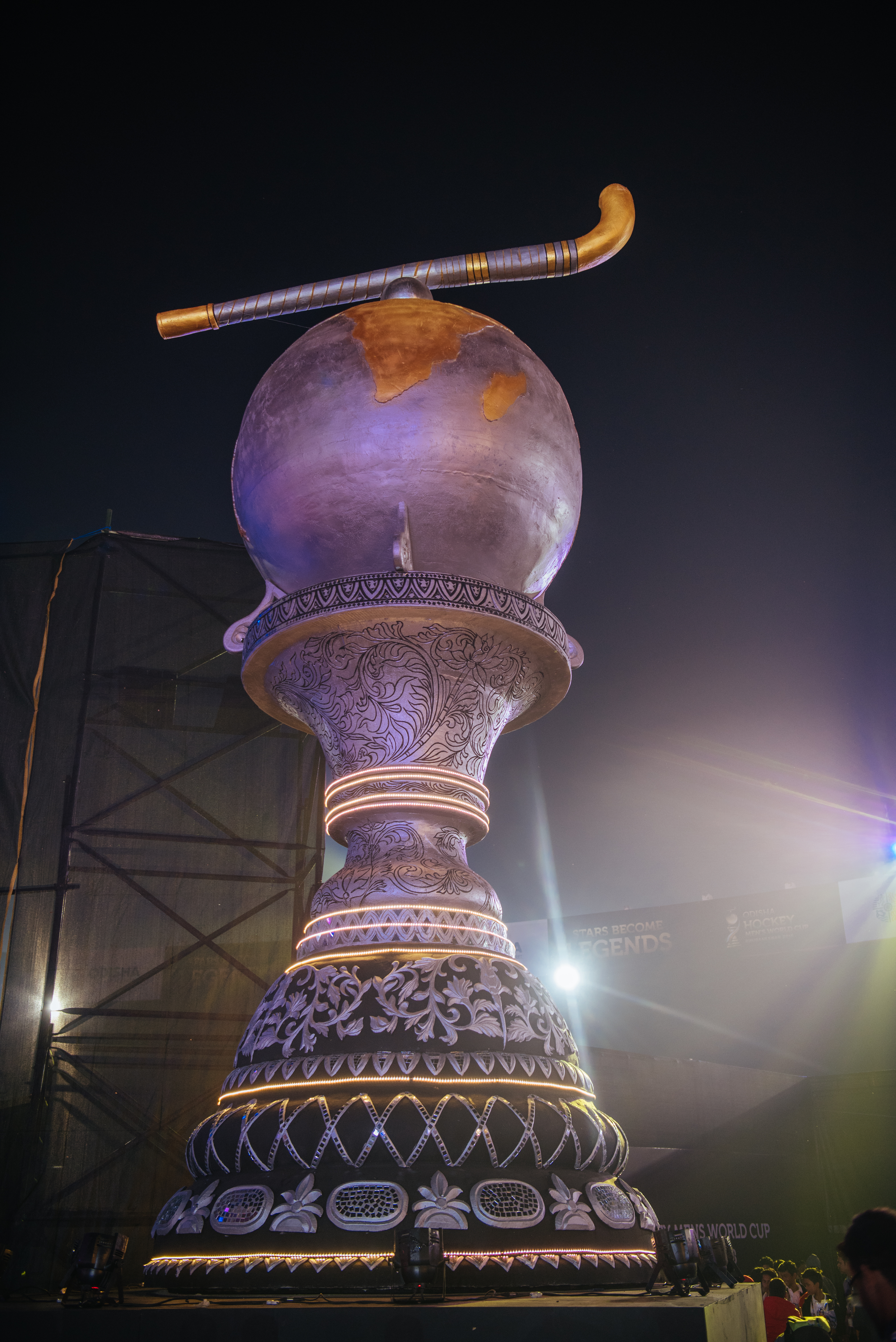
Trophy model of Hockey World Cup

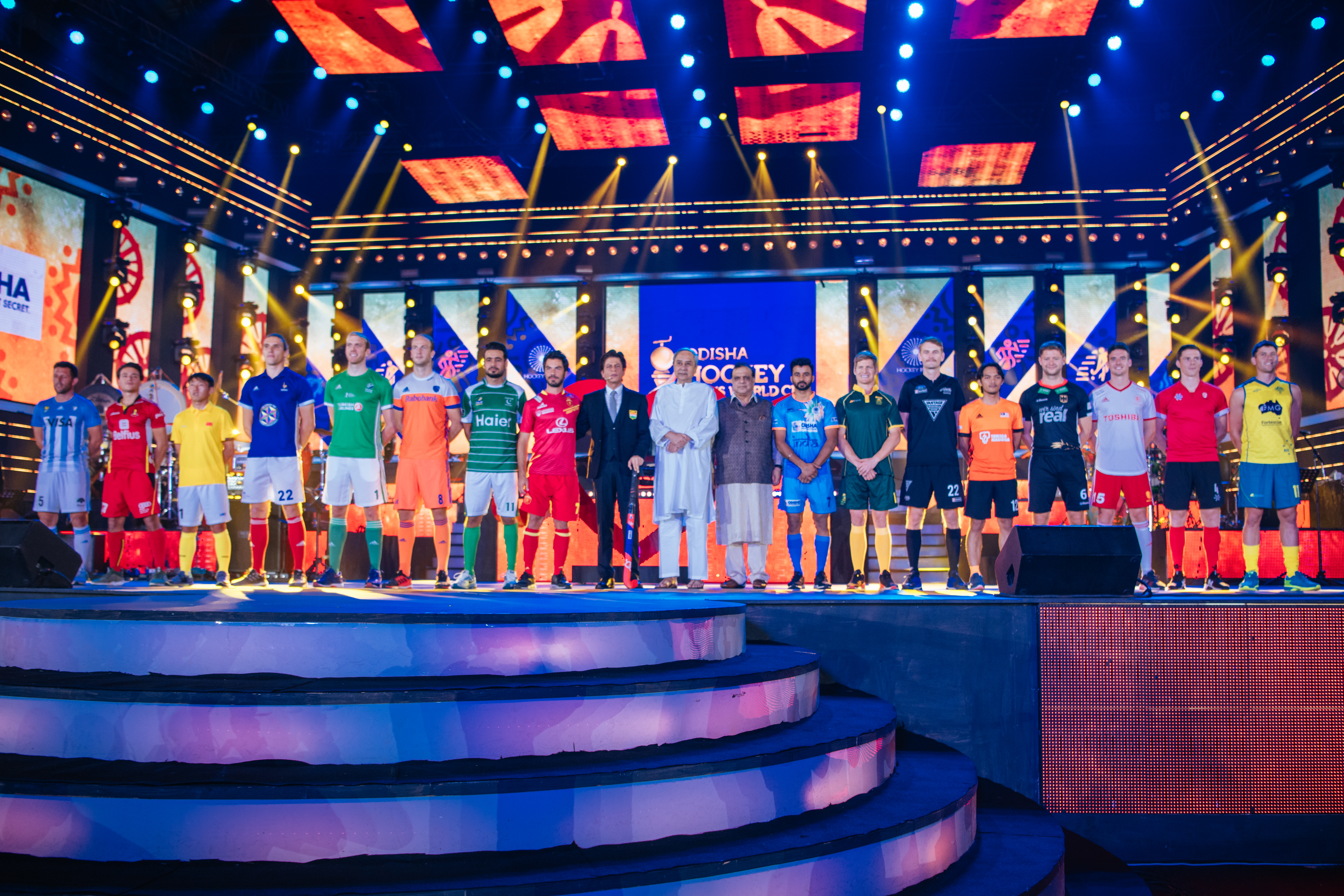
Shahrukh Khan and Naveen Pattnaik with the participating teams' captains

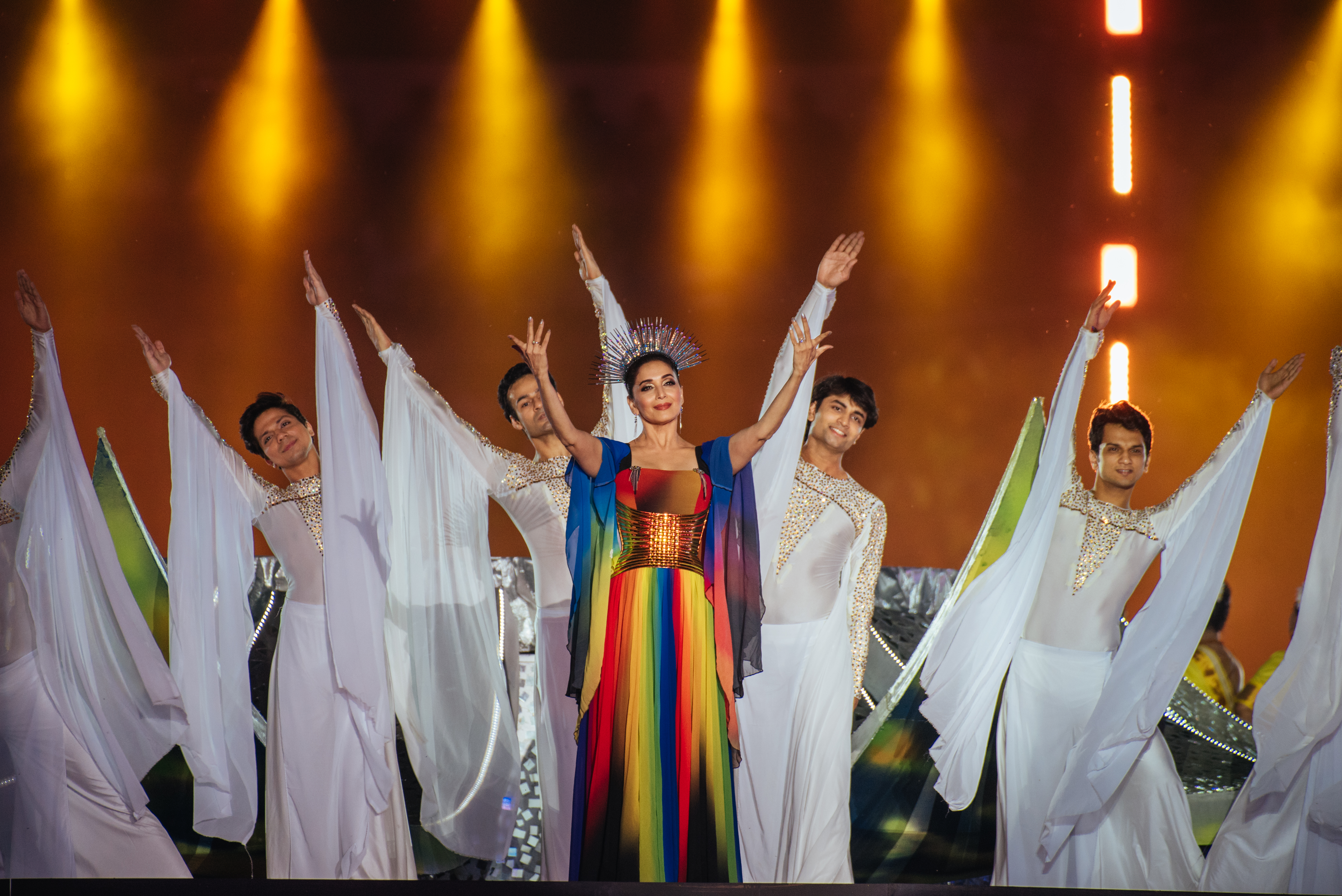
A dance performance by Madhuri Dixit

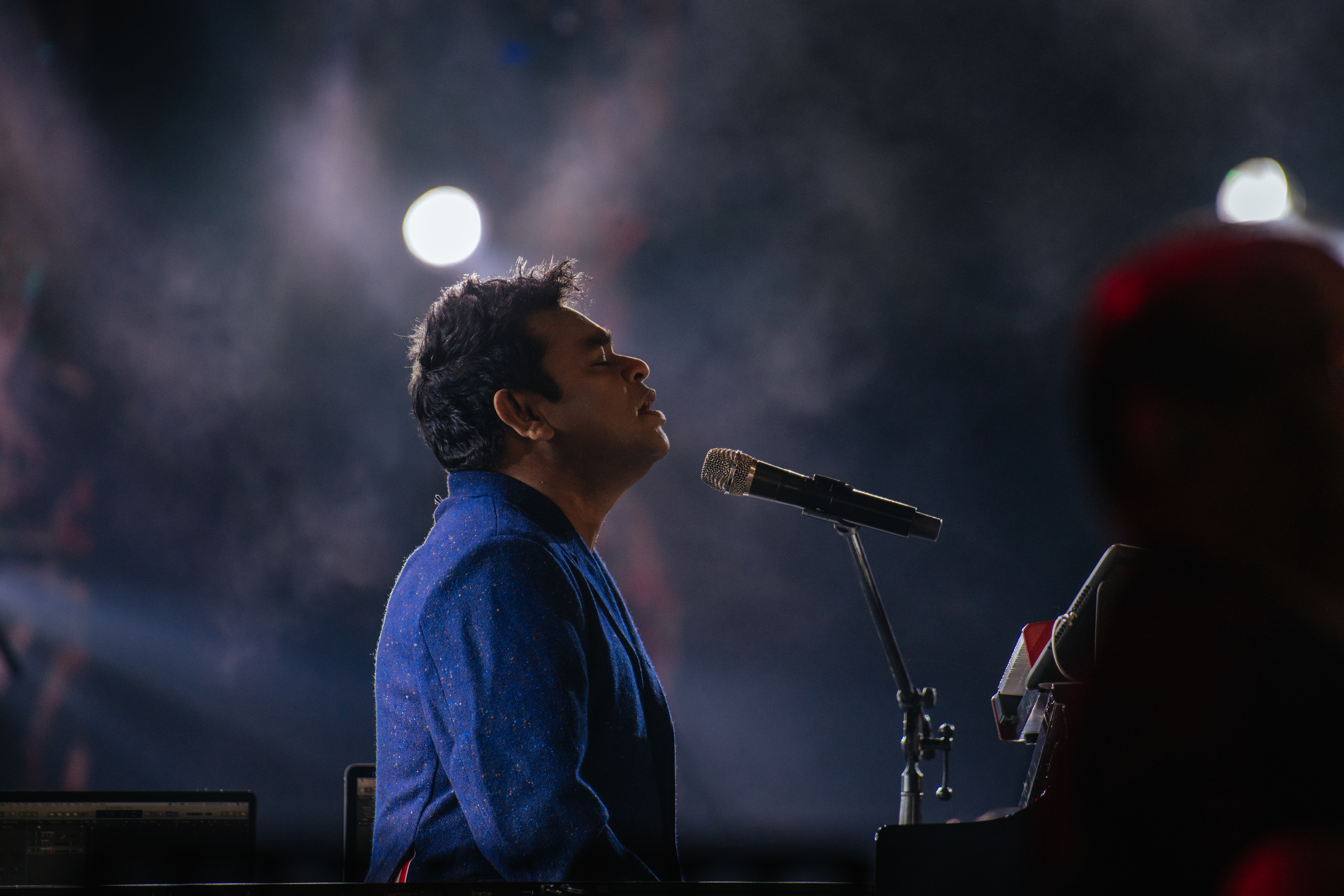
A.R Rahman during a performance

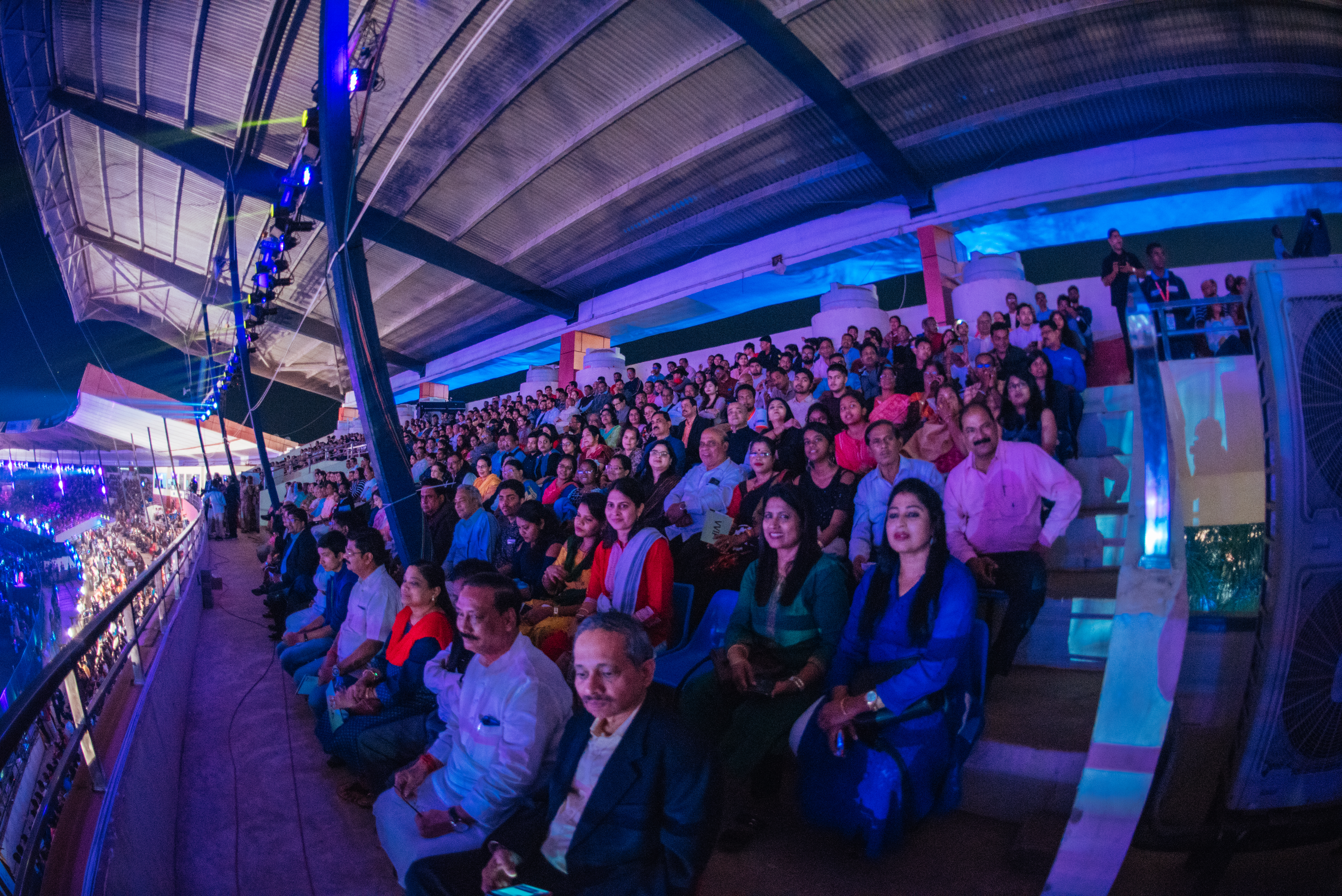
Audience in the inauguration ceremony

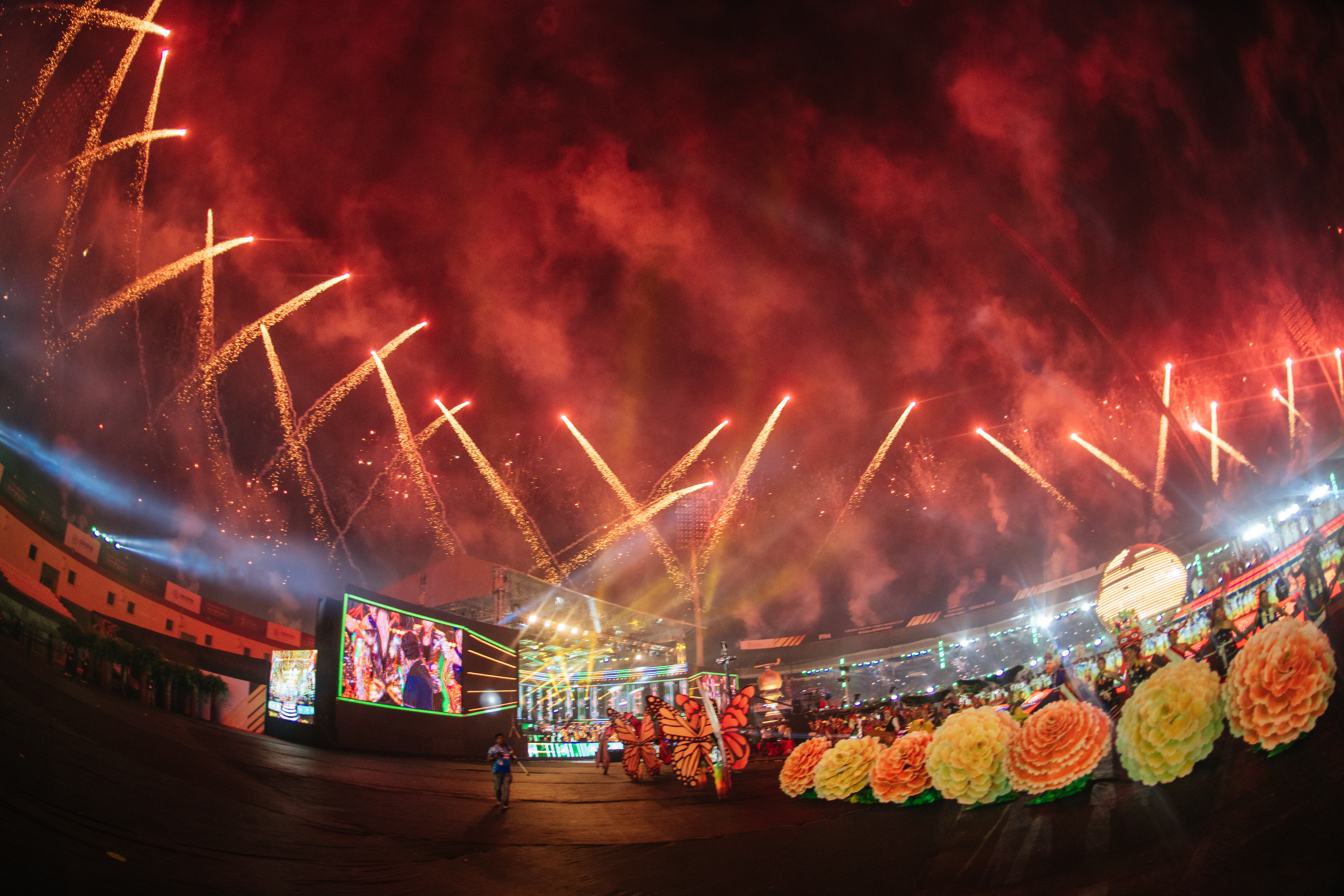
Fireworks

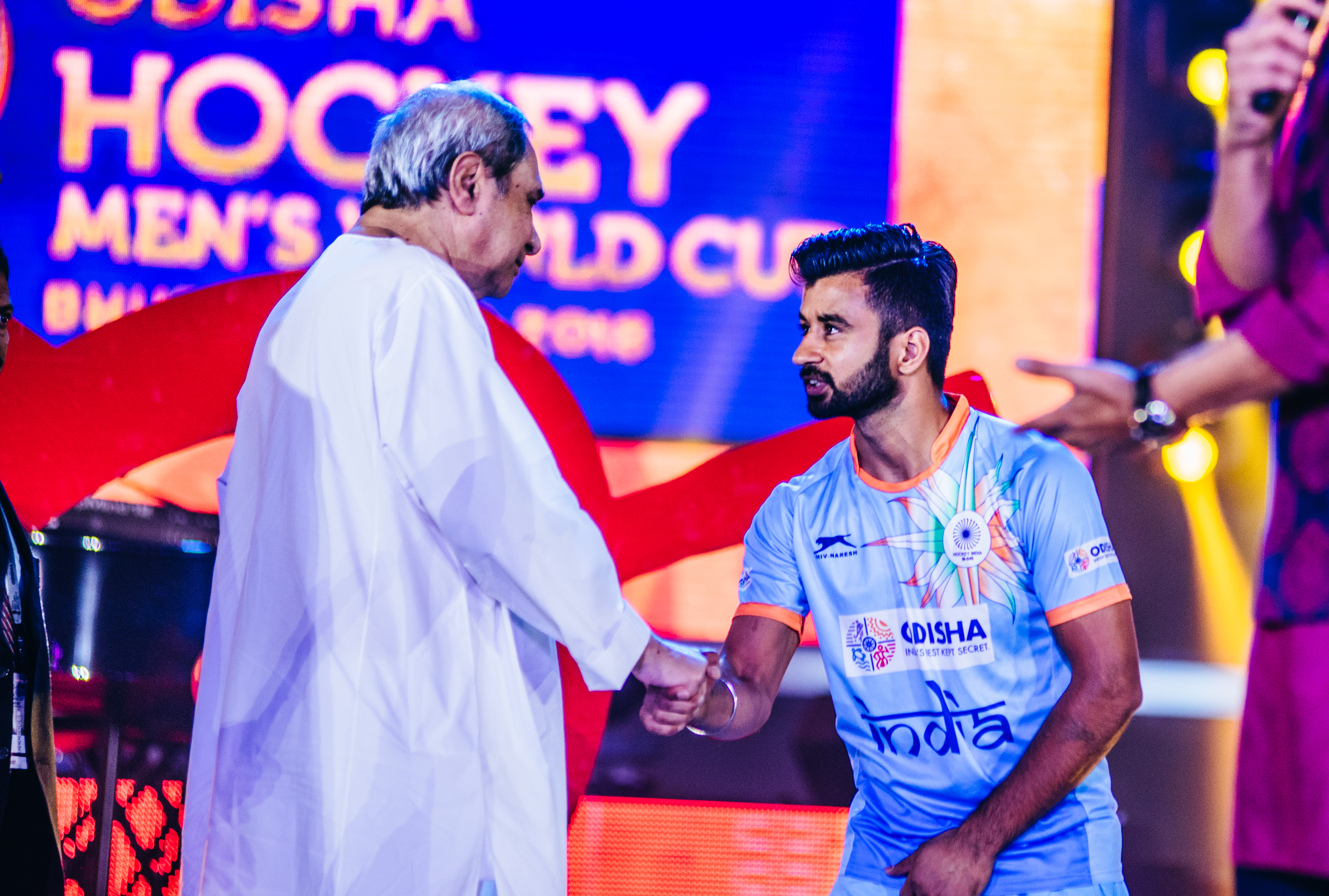
Naveen Pattnaik with Indian Captain Manpreet Singh

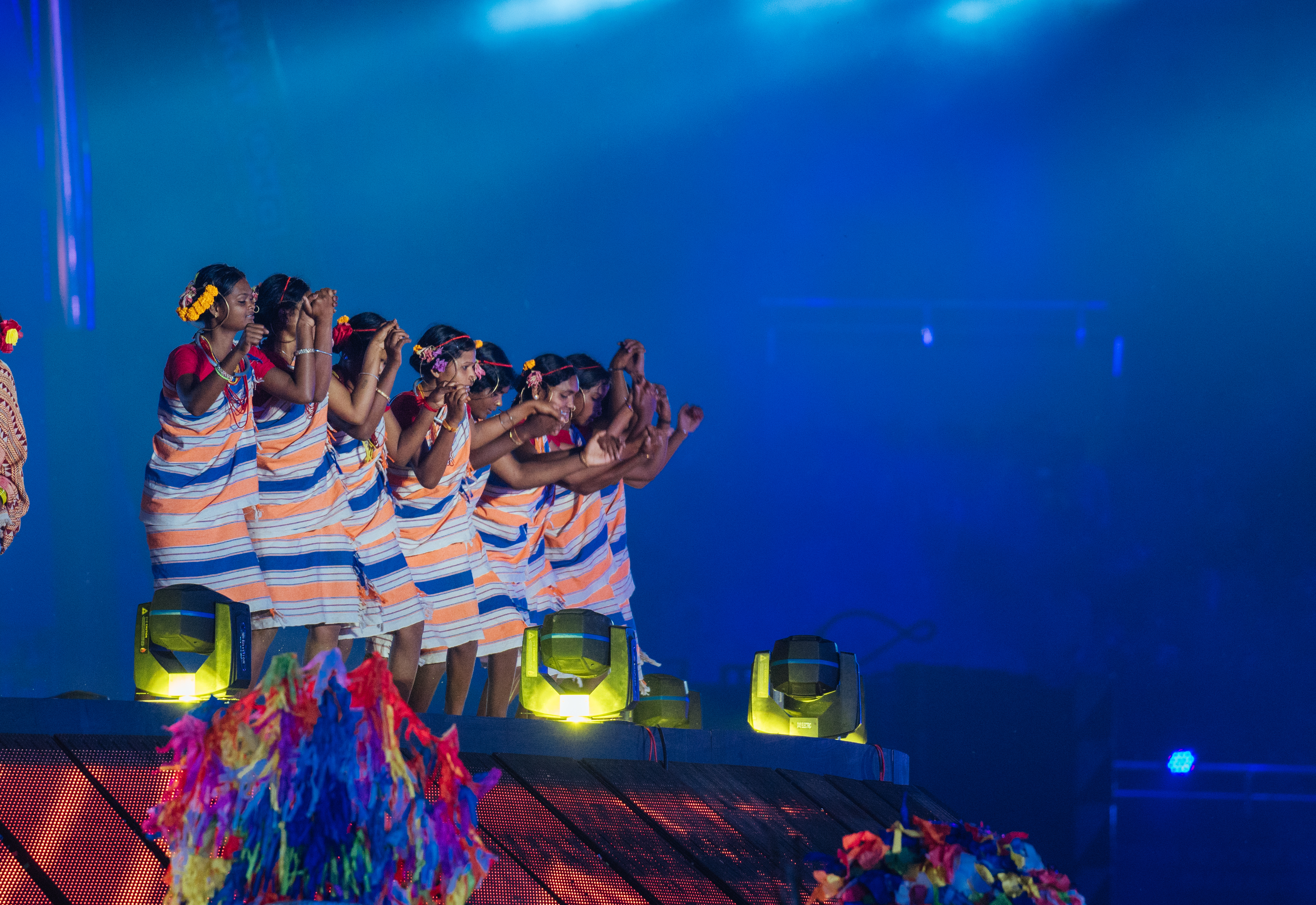
A traditional dance by Adivasis

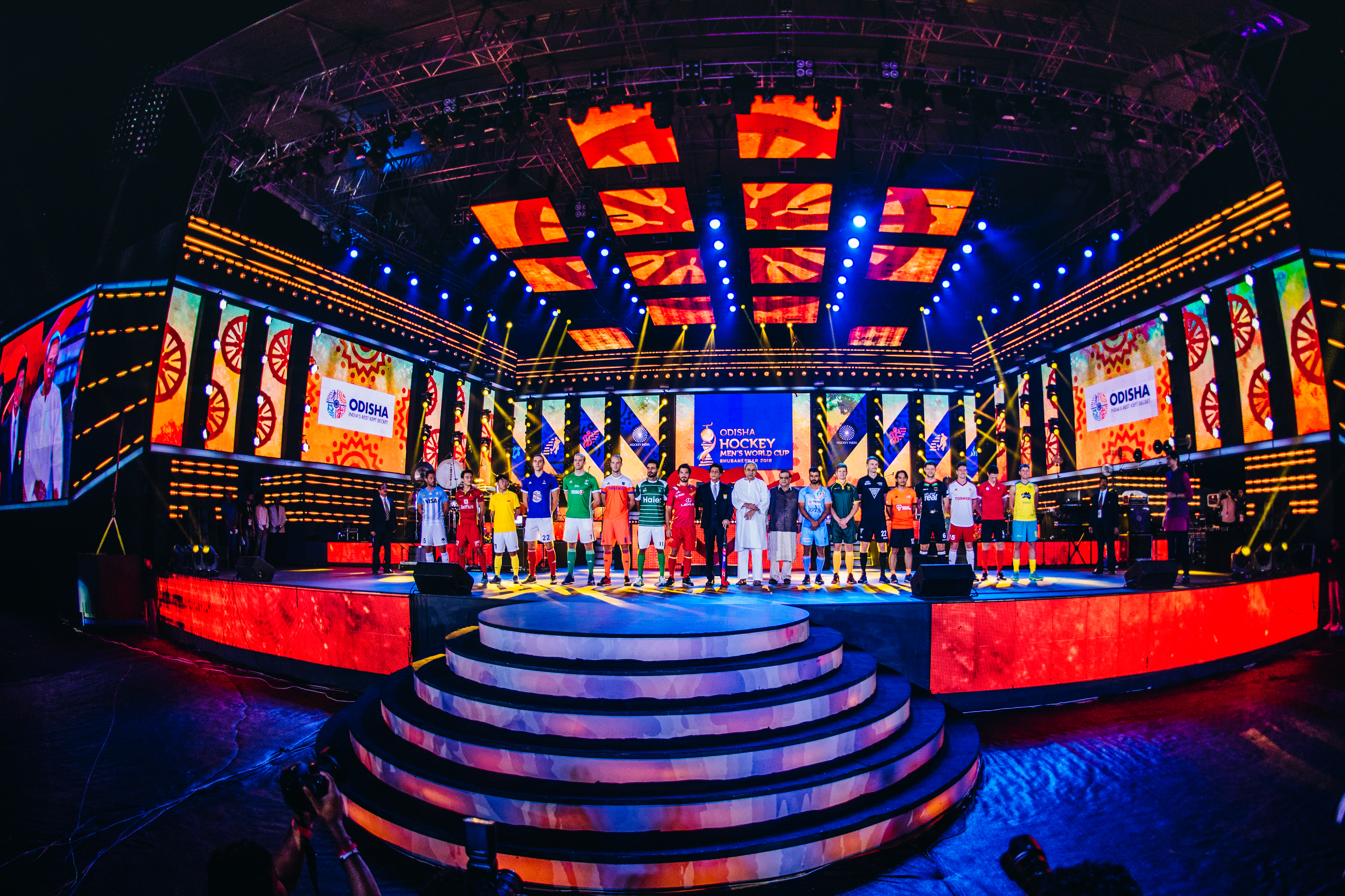
Stage decoration

== Results ==
The schedule was published on 27 February 2018.

All times are local (UTC+5:30).

=== First round ===
==== Pool A ====
Pos	Team	Pld	W	D	L	GF	GA	GD	Pts	Qualification
1	Argentina	3	2	0	1	10	8	+2	6	Quarter-finals
2	France	3	1	1	1	7	6	+1	4	Cross-overs
3	New Zealand	3	1	1	1	4	6	−2	4	Cross-overs
4	Spain	3	0	2	1	6	7	−1	2	

Source: FIH
Rules for classification: 1) points; 2) matches won; 3) goal difference; 4) goals for; 5) head-to-head result.

29 November 2018
17:00

Argentina	4–3	Spain
Mazzilli 4', 15'; Peillat 15+', 49'	Report	González 3'; Romeu 14'; Ruiz 35'

Umpires:
Marcin Grochal (POL)
Javed Shaikh (IND)

29 November 2018
19:00

New Zealand	2–1	France
Russell 16'; Jenness 56'	Report	Charlet 59'

Umpires:
Martin Madden (SCO)
Peter Wright (RSA)

3 December 2018
17:00

Spain	1–1	France
Iglesias 48'	Report	Clément 6'

Umpires:
Eric Kim Lai Koh (MAS)
Dan Barstow (ENG)

3 December 2018
19:00

New Zealand	0–3	Argentina
	Report	Mazzilli 23'; Vila 41'; Martínez 55'

Umpires:
Ben Göntgen (GER)
Lim Hong Zhen (SGP)

6 December 2018
17:00

Spain	2–2	New Zealand
Beltrán 9'; Iglesias 27'	Report	Phillips 50'; Russell 56'

Umpires:
Peter Wright (RSA)
Raghu Prasad (IND)

6 December 2018
19:00

Argentina	3–5	France
Martínez 28'; Peillat 44', 48'	Report	H. Genestet 18'; Charlet 23'; Coisne 26'; Baumgarten 30'; Goyet 54'

Umpires:
Eric Kim Lai Koh (MAS)
Jonas van't Hek (NED)

==== Pool B ====
Pos	Team	Pld	W	D	L	GF	GA	GD	Pts	Qualification
1	Australia	3	3	0	0	16	1	+15	9	Quarter-finals
2	England	3	1	1	1	6	7	−1	4	Cross-overs
3	China	3	0	2	1	3	14	−11	2	Cross-overs
4	Ireland	3	0	1	2	4	7	−3	1	

Source: FIH
Rules for classification: 1) points; 2) matches won; 3) goal difference; 4) goals for; 5) head-to-head result.

30 November 2018
17:00

Australia	2–1	Ireland
Govers 11'; Brand 34'	Report	O'Donoghue 13'

Umpires:
Jonas van't Hek (NED)
Francisco Vásquez (ESP)

30 November 2018
19:00

England	2–2	China
Gleghorne 14'; Ansell 48'	Report	Guo X. 5'; Du 59'

Umpires:
Eric Kim Lai Koh (MAS)
Gregory Uyttenhove (BEL)

4 December 2018
17:00

England	0–3	Australia
	Report	Whetton 47'; Govers 50'; Weyer 56'

Umpires:
Raghu Prasad (IND)
David Tomlinson (NZL)

4 December 2018
19:00

Ireland	1–1	China
Sothern 44'	Report	Guo J. 43'

Umpires:
Simon Taylor (NZL)
Javed Shaikh (IND)

7 December 2018
17:00

Australia	11–0	China
Govers 10', 19', 34'; Zaleweski 15'; Craig 16'; Hayward 22'; Whetton 29'; Brand 33', 55'; Wotherspoon 39'; Ogilvie 49'	Report

Umpires:
Diego Barbas (ARG)
Lim Hong Zhen (SGP)

7 December 2018
19:00

Ireland	2–4	England
Cargo 35'; O'Donoghue 37'	Report	Condon 15'; Ansell 37'; Gall 38'; Gleghorne 60+'

Umpires:
Marcin Grochal (POL)
Ben Göntgen (GER)

==== Pool C ====
Pos	Team	Pld	W	D	L	GF	GA	GD	Pts	Qualification
1	India (H)	3	2	1	0	12	3	+9	7	Quarter-finals
2	Belgium	3	2	1	0	9	4	+5	7	Cross-overs
3	Canada	3	0	1	2	3	8	−5	1	Cross-overs
4	South Africa	3	0	1	2	2	11	−9	1	

Source: FIH
Rules for classification: 1) points; 2) matches won; 3) goal difference; 4) goals for; 5) head-to-head result.
(H) Hosts

28 November 2018
17:00

Belgium	2–1	Canada
Denayer 3'; Briels 22'	Report	Pearson 48'

Umpires:
Adam Kearns (AUS)
Lim Hong Zhen (SGP)

28 November 2018
19:00

India	5–0	South Africa
Mandeep 10'; Akashdeep 12'; Simranjeet 43', 46'; Lalit 45'	Report

Umpires:
Ben Göntgen (GER)
Diego Barbas (ARG)

2 December 2018
17:00

Canada	1–1	South Africa
Tupper 45'	Report	Ntuli 43'

Umpires:
Martin Madden (SCO)
Jonas van't Hek (NED)

2 December 2018
19:00

India	2–2	Belgium
Harmanpreet 39'; Simranjeet 47'	Report	Hendrickx 8'; Gougnard 56'

Umpires:
Marcin Grochal (POL)
Francisco Vásquez (ESP)

8 December 2018
17:00

Belgium	5–1	South Africa
Hendrickx 14', 22'; Gougnard 18'; Luypaert 30'; Charlier 48'	Report	Spooner 1'

Umpires:
Eric Kim Lai Koh (MAS)
David Tomlinson (NZL)

8 December 2018
19:00

Canada	1–5	India
Van Son 39'	Report	Harmanpreet 12'; Chinglensana 46'; Lalit 47', 57'; Amit 51'

Umpires:
Dan Barstow (ENG)
Simon Taylor (NZL)

==== Pool D ====
Pos	Team	Pld	W	D	L	GF	GA	GD	Pts	Qualification
1	Germany	3	3	0	0	10	4	+6	9	Quarter-finals
2	Netherlands	3	2	0	1	13	5	+8	6	Cross-overs
3	Pakistan	3	0	1	2	2	7	−5	1	Cross-overs
4	Malaysia	3	0	1	2	4	13	−9	1	

Source: FIH
Rules for classification: 1) points; 2) matches won; 3) goal difference; 4) goals for; 5) head-to-head result.

1 December 2018
17:00

Netherlands	7–0	Malaysia
Hertzberger 12', 29', 60'; Pruyser 21'; Van der Weerden 35'; Kemperman 42'; Brinkman 57'	Report

Umpires:
Raghu Prasad (IND)
Simon Taylor (NZL)

1 December 2018
19:00

Germany	1–0	Pakistan
Miltkau 36'	Report

Umpires:
Dan Barstow (ENG)
David Tomlinson (NZL)

5 December 2018
17:00

Germany	4–1	Netherlands
Müller 30'; Windfeder 52'; Miltkau 54'; Rühr 58'	Report	Verga 13'

Umpires:
Peter Wright (RSA)
Adam Kearns (AUS)

5 December 2018
19:00

Malaysia	1–1	Pakistan
Faizal 55'	Report	Atiq 51'

Umpires:
Gregory Uttenhove (BEL)
Diego Barbas (ARG)

9 December 2018
17:00

Malaysia	3–5	Germany
Razie 26', 42'; Nabil 28'	Report	Herzbruch 2', 59'; Rühr 14', 18'; Miltkau 39'

Umpires:
Javed Shaikh (IND)
Gregory Uyttenhove (BEL)

9 December 2018
19:00

Netherlands	5–1	Pakistan
Brinkman 7'; Verga 27'; De Voogd 37'; Croon 47'; Van der Weerden 59'	Report	Bhutta 9'

Umpires:
Martin Madden (SCO)
Francisco Vásquez (ESP)

=== Second round ===
Cross-overs
10 December
England	2
New Zealand	0
11 December
Belgium	5
Pakistan	0
10 December
France	1
China	0
11 December
Netherlands	5
Canada	0

Quarter-finals
12 December
Argentina	2
England	3
13 December
Germany	1
Belgium	2
12 December
Australia	3
France	0
13 December
India	1
Netherlands	2

Semi-finals
15 December
England	0
Belgium	6
15 December
Australia	2 (3)
Netherlands (p.s.o.)	2 (4)

Final
16 December
Belgium (p.s.o.)	0 (3)
Netherlands	0 (2)
Third place
16 December
England	1
Australia	8

==== Cross-overs ====
10 December 2018
16:45

England	2–0	New Zealand
Calnan 25'; Taylor 44'	Report

Umpires:
Adam Kearns (AUS)
Raghu Prasad (IND)

10 December 2018
19:00

France	1–0	China
Clément 36'	Report

Umpires:
Martin Madden (SCO)
Jonas van't Hek (NED)

11 December 2018
16:45

Belgium	5–0	Pakistan
Hendrickx 10'; Briels 13'; Charlier 27'; Dockier 35'; Boon 53'	Report

Umpires:
Marcin Grochal (POL)
Dan Barstow (ENG)

11 December 2018
19:00

Netherlands	5–0	Canada
Balk 16'; Kemperman 20'; Van Dam 40', 58'; Brinkman 41'	Report

Umpires:
Peter Wright (RSA)
Diego Barbas (ARG)

==== Quarter-finals ====
12 December 2018
16:45

Argentina	2–3	England
Peillat 17', 48'	Report	Middleton 27'; Calnan 45'; Martin 49'

Umpires:
Javed Shaikh (IND)
Ben Göntgen (GER)

12 December 2018
19:00

Australia	3–0	France
Hayward 4'; Govers 19'; Zalewski 37'	Report

Umpires:
Lim Hong Zhen (SGP)
Gregory Uttenhove (BEL)

13 December 2018
16:45

Germany	1–2	Belgium
Linnekogel 14'	Report	Hendrickx 18'; Boon 50'

Umpires:
Simon Taylor (NZL)
Francisco Vázquez (ESP)

13 December 2018
19:00

India	1–2	Netherlands
Akashdeep 12'	Report	Brinkman 15'; Van der Weerden 50'

Umpires:
David Tomlinson (NZL)
Adam Kearns (AUS)

==== Semi-finals ====
15 December 2018
16:00

England	0–6	Belgium
	Report	Boon 8'; Gougnard 19'; Charlier 42'; Hendrickx 45+', 50'; Dockier 53'

Umpires:
David Tomlinson (NZL)
Ben Göntgen (GER)

15 December 2018
18:30

Australia	2–2	Netherlands
Howard 45'; Ockenden 60'	Report	Schuurman 9'; Van Ass 20'
Penalties
Zalewski (penalty shoot-out missed); Beale (penalty shoot-out scored); Craig (penalty shoot-out scored); Brand (penalty shoot-out missed); Whetton (penalty shoot-out scored); Beale (penalty shoot-out missed)	3–4	(penalty shoot-out scored) Hertzberger; (penalty shoot-out missed) Pruyser; (penalty shoot-out missed) Kemperman; (penalty shoot-out scored) Van Ass; (penalty shoot-out scored) Van Dam; (penalty shoot-out scored) Hertzberger

Umpires:
Martin Madden (SCO)
Dan Barstow (ENG)

==== Third place match ====
16 December 2018
16:30

England	1–8	Australia
Middleton 45'	Report	Govers 8'; Craig 9', 19', 34'; Mitton 32'; Brand 34'; Hayward 57', 60'

Umpires:
Javed Shaikh (IND)
David Tomlinson (NZL)

==== Final ====
16 December 2018
19:00

Belgium	0–0	Netherlands
	Report
Penalties
Van Doren (penalty shoot-out missed); Denayer (penalty shoot-out missed); Van Aubel (penalty shoot-out scored); Wegnez (penalty shoot-out scored); De Sloover (penalty shoot-out missed); Van Aubel (penalty shoot-out scored)	3–2	(penalty shoot-out scored) Hertzberger; (penalty shoot-out missed) Pruyser; (penalty shoot-out scored) De Geus; (penalty shoot-out missed) Van Ass; (penalty shoot-out missed) Van Dam; (penalty shoot-out missed) Hertzberger

Umpires:
Adam Kearns (AUS)
Marcin Grochal (POL)

== Final ranking ==
Pos	Team	Pld	W	D	L	GF	GA	GD	Pts	Final result
1st place, gold medalist(s)	Belgium	7	5	2	0	22	5	+17	17	Gold medal
2nd place, silver medalist(s)	Netherlands	7	4	2	1	22	8	+14	14	Silver medal
3rd place, bronze medalist(s)	Australia	6	5	1	0	29	4	+25	16	Bronze medal
4	England	7	3	1	3	12	23	−11	10	Fourth place
5	Germany	4	3	0	1	11	6	+5	9	Eliminated in quarterfinals
6	India (H)	4	2	1	1	13	5	+8	7	Eliminated in quarterfinals
7	Argentina	4	2	0	2	12	11	+1	6	Eliminated in quarterfinals
8	France	5	2	1	2	8	9	−1	7	Eliminated in quarterfinals
9	New Zealand	4	1	1	2	4	8	−4	4	Eliminated in crossover matches
10	China	4	0	2	2	3	15	−12	2	Eliminated in crossover matches
11	Canada	4	0	1	3	3	13	−10	1	Eliminated in crossover matches
12	Pakistan	4	0	1	3	2	12	−10	1	Eliminated in crossover matches
13	Spain	3	0	2	1	6	7	−1	2	Eliminated in group stage
14	Ireland	3	0	1	2	4	7	−3	1	Eliminated in group stage
15	Malaysia	3	0	1	2	4	13	−9	1	Eliminated in group stage
16	South Africa	3	0	1	2	2	11	−9	1	Eliminated in group stage

Source: FIH
Rules for classification: 1) round; 2) position in pools; 3) points in pools; 4) matches won; 5) goal difference; 6) goals for.
(H) Hosts

== Awards ==
The following awards were given at the conclusion of the tournament.

Player of the tournament	Goalkeeper of the tournament	Young player of the tournament	Top goalscorer	Fair play award
(Belgium) Arthur Van Doren	(Netherlands) Pirmin Blaak	(Netherlands) Thijs van Dam	(Australia) Blake Govers (Belgium) Alexander Hendrickx	Spain

== Goalscorers ==
There were 157 goals scored in 36 matches, for an average of 4.36 goals per match.

7 goals

- (Australia) Blake Govers
- (Belgium) Alexander Hendrickx

6 goals

- (Argentina) Gonzalo Peillat

4 goals

- (Australia) Timothy Brand
- (Australia) Tom Craig
- (Australia) Jeremy Hayward
- (Netherlands) Thierry Brinkman

3 goals

- (Argentina) Agustín Mazzilli
- (Belgium) Tom Boon
- (Belgium) Cédric Charlier
- (Belgium) Simon Gougnard
- (Germany) Marco Miltkau
- (Germany) Christopher Rühr
- (India) Simranjeet Singh
- (India) Lalit Upadhyay
- (Netherlands) Jeroen Hertzberger
- (Netherlands) Mink van der Weerden

2 goals

- (Argentina) Lucas Martínez
- (Australia) Jake Whetton
- (Australia) Aran Zalewski
- (Belgium) Thomas Briels
- (Belgium) Sébastien Dockier
- (England) Liam Ansell
- (England) Will Calnan
- (England) Mark Gleghorne
- (England) Barry Middleton
- (France) Victor Charlet
- (France) Timothée Clément
- (Germany) Timm Herzbruch
- (India) Akashdeep Singh
- (India) Harmanpreet Singh
- (Ireland) Shane O'Donoghue
- (Malaysia) Razie Rahim
- (Netherlands) Thijs van Dam
- (Netherlands) Robbert Kemperman
- (Netherlands) Valentin Verga
- (New Zealand) Kane Russell
- (Spain) Álvaro Iglesias

1 goal

- (Argentina) Lucas Vila
- (Australia) Tim Howard
- (Australia) Trent Mitton
- (Australia) Eddie Ockenden
- (Australia) Flynn Ogilvie
- (Australia) Corey Weyer
- (Australia) Dylan Wotherspoon
- (Belgium) Félix Denayer
- (Belgium) Loïck Luypaert
- (Canada) Mark Pearson
- (Canada) Floris van Son
- (Canada) Scott Tupper
- (China) Du Talake
- (China) Guo Jin
- (China) Guo Xiaoping
- (England) David Condon
- (England) Harry Martin
- (England) James Gall
- (England) Luke Taylor
- (France) Gaspard Baumgarten
- (France) Aristide Coisne
- (France) Hugo Genestet
- (France) François Goyet
- (Germany) Dieter Linnekogel
- (Germany) Mathias Müller
- (Germany) Lukas Windfeder
- (India) Amit Rohidas
- (India) Chinglensana Singh
- (India) Mandeep Singh
- (Ireland) Chris Cargo
- (Ireland) Alan Sothern
- (Malaysia) Nabil Fiqri
- (Malaysia) Faizal Saari
- (Netherlands) Seve van Ass
- (Netherlands) Lars Balk
- (Netherlands) Jorrit Croon
- (Netherlands) Mirco Pruyser
- (Netherlands) Glenn Schuurman
- (Netherlands) Bob de Voogd
- (New Zealand) Stephen Jenness
- (New Zealand) Hayden Phillips
- (Pakistan) Muhammad Atiq
- (Pakistan) Muhammad Umar Bhutta
- (South Africa) Nqobile Ntuli
- (South Africa) Nicholas Spooner
- (Spain) Albert Beltrán
- (Spain) Enrique González
- (Spain) Josep Romeu
- (Spain) Viçens Ruiz

Source: FIH
