= Pirmin Blaak =

Dutch field hockey player

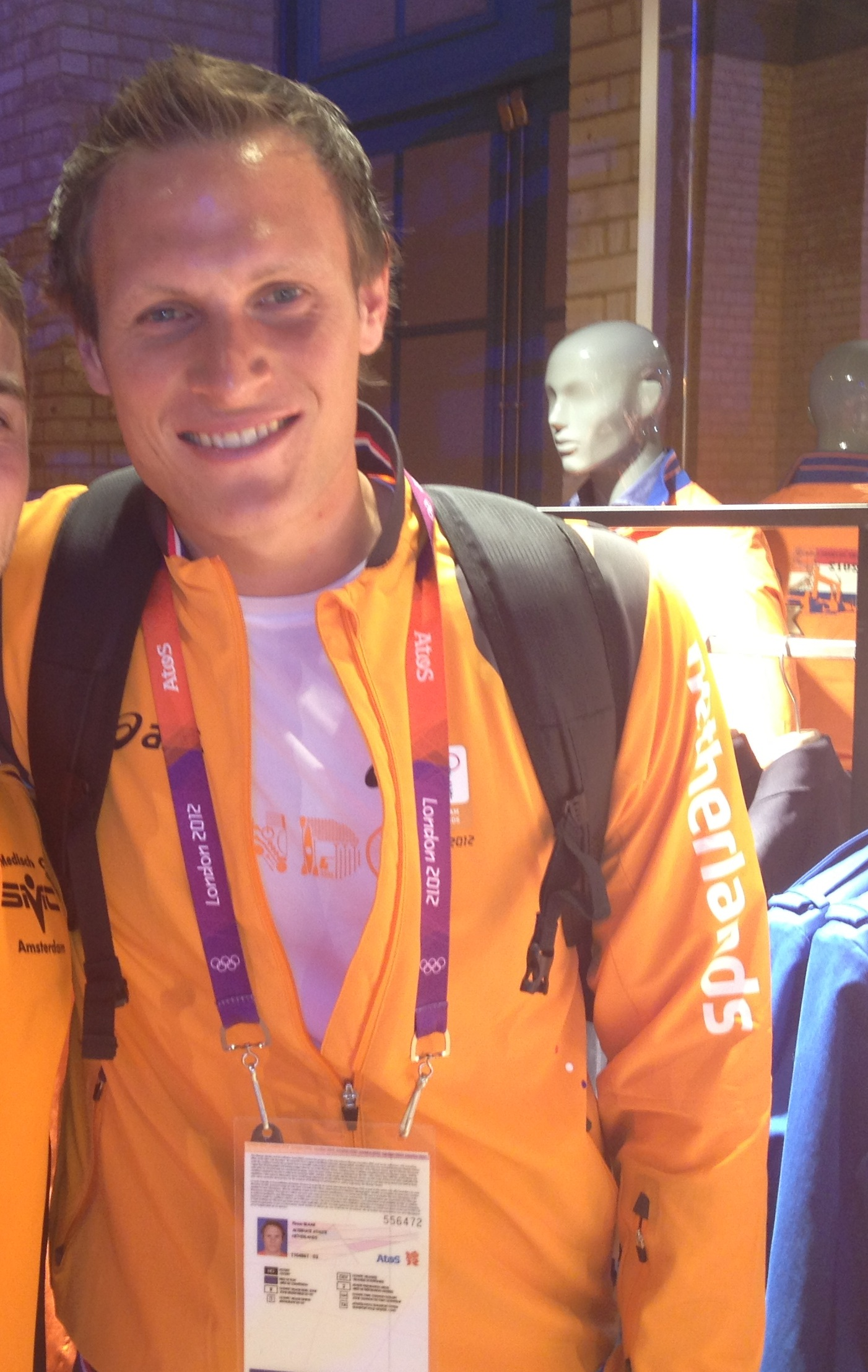
- Blaak in 2012

Personal information
- Born: 8 March 1988 (age 38) Rotterdam, Netherlands
- Height: 1.88 m (6 ft 2 in)
- Weight: 83 kg (183 lb)

Sport
- Sport: Field hockey
- Position: Goalkeeper
- Club: Braxgata
Youth career
- Years: Team
- –2000: HC Barendrecht
- 2000–2006: Rotterdam
Senior career
Years	Team	Caps	Goals
2006–2016	Rotterdam	-	-
2016–2024	Oranje-Rood	-	-
2024–present	Braxgata	-	-
National team
Years	Team	Caps	Goals
2011–2024	Netherlands	154	(0)
Medal record
Men's field hockey
Representing the Netherlands
Olympic Games
Gold medal – first place	2024 Paris	Team
World Cup
Silver medal – second place	2014 The Hague
Silver medal – second place	2018 Bhubaneswar
Bronze medal – third place	2023 Bhubaneswar–Rourkela
EuroHockey Championship
Gold medal – first place	2015 London
Gold medal – first place	2017 Amstelveen
Gold medal – first place	2021 Amstelveen
Silver medal – second place	2011 Mönchengladbach
Bronze medal – third place	2013 Boom
Bronze medal – third place	2019 Antwerp
Champions Trophy
Silver medal – second place	2012 Melbourne
Bronze medal – third place	2011 Auckland
Bronze medal – third place	2018 Breda
Hockey World League
Gold medal – first place	2012–13 New Delhi	Team
- Updated on 19 January 2025

Pirmin Blaak (Dutch pronunciation: [ˈpɪrmɪm ˈblaːk]; born 8 March 1988) is a Dutch field hockey player who plays as a goalkeeper for Belgian Hockey League club Braxgata. He played a total of 154 matches for the Dutch national team from 2011 to 2024.

== Club career ==
Blaak started playing hockey at HC Barendrecht. In 2000 he switched to Rotterdam, with whom he won their first national title in 2013. He played there for 16 years until 2016 when he switched to Oranje-Rood. After the 2024 Summer Olympics he signed a two-year contract at Braxgata in Belgium.

== International career ==
Blaak made his debut for the national team in 2011. He was the second goalkeeper behind Jaap Stockmann until 2016 when he became the joint first goalkeeper with Sam van der Ven. For the 2018 World Cup he was chosen as the first goalkeeper for the tournament. In June 2019, he was selected as the joint first goalkeeper in the Netherlands squad for the 2019 EuroHockey Championship. They won the bronze medal by defeating Germany 4–0. After the gold medal win at the 2024 Summer Olympics, he announced his retirement from the national team.
