= John Kinder =

John Kinder may refer to:

- John Kinder (racing driver)
- John Kinder (priest)
