= Harry Martin (field hockey) =

English field hockey player (born 1992)

Personal information
- Born: 23 October 1992 (age 33) Ipswich, England
- Height: 1.84 m (6 ft 0 in)
- Weight: 81 kg (179 lb)

Sport
- Sport: Field hockey
- Position: Midfielder
Senior career
Years	Team	Caps	Goals
2008–2009	Ipswich	-	-
2009–2012	Old Loughtonians	-	-
2012–2016	Beeston	-	-
2016–2017	Rotterdam	-	-
2017–2020	Hampstead & Westminster	-	-
2021–2024	Rotterdam	-	-
2024–present	Hurley	-	-
National team
Years	Team	Caps	Goals
2010–2023	England & GB	245	(29)
Medal record
Men's field hockey
Representing England
EuroHockey Championship
Bronze medal – third place	2017 Amstelveen	Team
Hockey World League
Bronze medal – third place	2014 New Delhi	Team
Commonwealth Games
Bronze medal – third place	2014 Glasgow	Team
Bronze medal – third place	2018 Gold Coast	Team

Harry John Martin (born 23 October 1992) is an English field hockey player who plays as a midfielder for Dutch Hoofdklasse club Hurley. He played a total of 245 matches for the England and Great Britain national teams from 2011 until 2024. He competed at three Olympic Games in 2012, 2016 and 2020.

His sister, Hannah Martin is an English field hockey player who plays as a midfielder or forward for England and Great Britain.

== Biography ==
Martin was born in Ipswich and educated at Ipswich School. He first played club hockey for Ipswich Hockey Club before moving to Old Loughtonians. While at Old Loughtonians, Martin made his senior debut, aged 17, for Great Britain on 12 July 2010 and played in the 2010 Commonwealth Games in Delhi. On 1 December 2012, he made his senior tournament debut for England in a 3–1 defeat against India, in the 2012 Champions Trophy, in Melbourne, Australia. He was the first player who has been involved in England Hockey's Single System (long term athlete development pathway) to be selected for an Olympic Games. At the 2012 Summer Olympics, he competed for Great Britain in the tournament. He was also shortlisted for the FIH World Young Player of the Year Award in 2012.

After the 2012 Olympics he left Old Loughtonians for Beeston, where he won the Men's England Hockey League Premier Division title in consecutive seasons in 2012–13 and 2013–14.

Martin represented England in the 2014 Commonwealth Games in Glasgow, where he won a bronze medal and represented Great Britain at the 2016 Olympic Games in Rio de Janeiro. After the Olympics he left Beeston to play in the Dutch Hoofdklasse for Rotterdam before joining Hampstead & Westminster from 2017. He participated in his second Olympics in 2016 and represented England at the 2018 Commonwealth Games in Gold Coast.

On 28 May 2021, he was selected in the England squad for the 2021 EuroHockey Championship and was selected as reserve for the Great Britain squad for the delayed 2020 Olympic Games in Tokyo.

For the 2021–22 season he returned to play club hockey for HC Rotterdam. After three seasons with Rotterdam he moved to fellow Dutch club Hurley.
