= Seve van Ass =

Dutch field hockey player

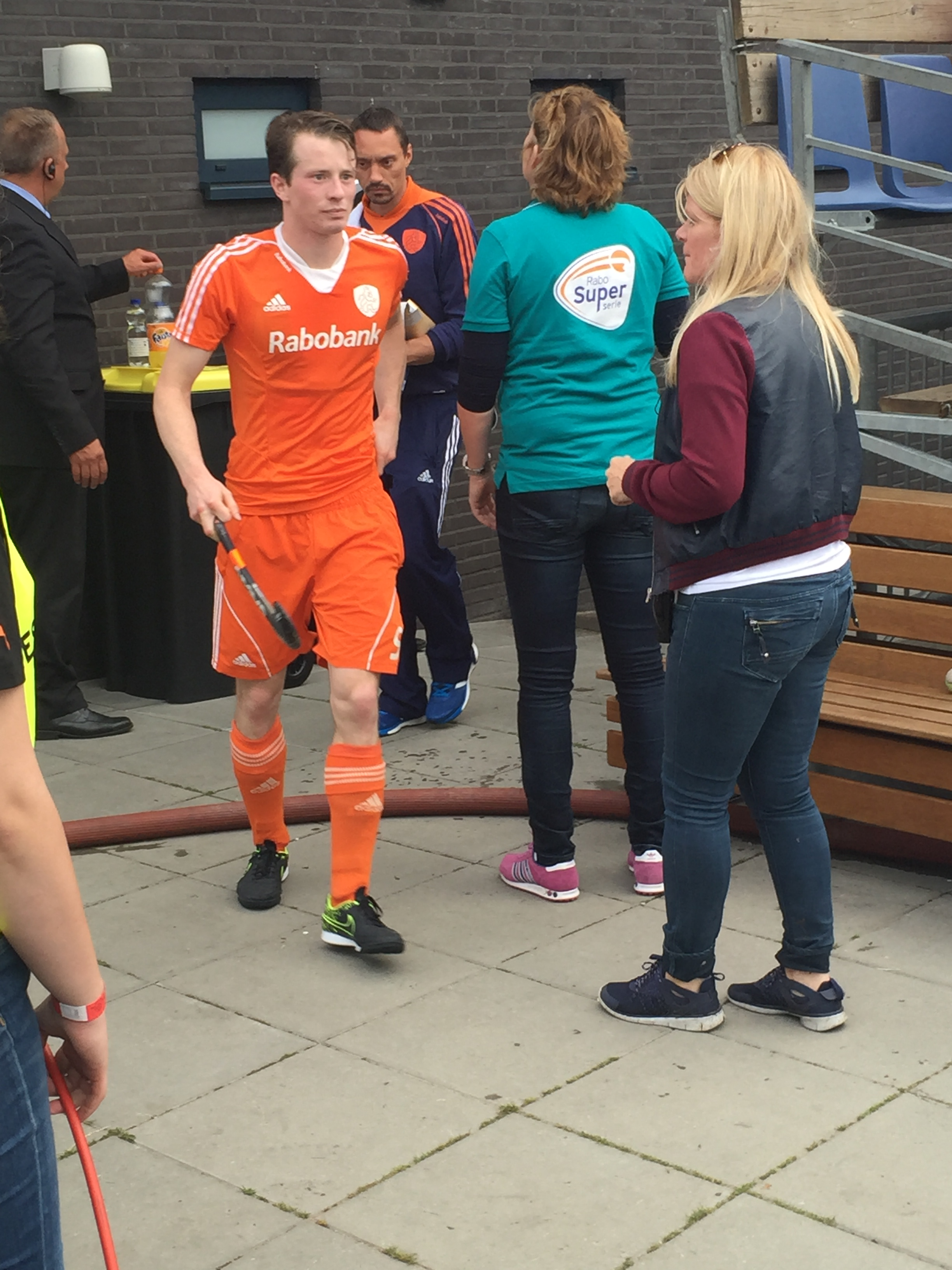
- Van Ass in 2016

Personal information
- Full name: Severiano Boris van Ass
- Born: 10 April 1992 (age 34) Rotterdam, Netherlands
- Height: 1.78 m (5 ft 10 in)
- Weight: 70 kg (154 lb)

Sport
- Sport: Field hockey
- Position: Midfielder / Forward
Youth career
- Team
- –: Victoria
Senior career
Years	Team	Caps	Goals
–2008	Victoria	-	-
2008–2013	HGC	-	-
2013–2018	Rotterdam	-	-
2018–2024	HGC	-	-
National team
Years	Team	Caps	Goals
2011–2024	Netherlands	236	(29)
Medal record
Men's field hockey
Representing the Netherlands
Olympic Games
Gold medal – first place	2024 Paris	Team
World Cup
Silver medal – second place	2014 The Hague
Silver medal – second place	2018 Bhubaneswar
Bronze medal – third place	2023 Bhubaneswar–Rourkela
EuroHockey Championship
Gold medal – first place	2015 London
Gold medal – first place	2017 Amstelveen
Gold medal – first place	2021 Amstelveen
Silver medal – second place	2011 Mönchengladbach
Bronze medal – third place	2013 Boom
Bronze medal – third place	2019 Antwerp
Champions Trophy
Silver medal – second place	2012 Melbourne
Bronze medal – third place	2011 Auckland
Bronze medal – third place	2018 Breda
Hockey World League
Gold medal – first place	2012–13 New Delhi	Team
EuroHockey Junior Championship
Gold medal – first place	2010 Siemianowice Śląskie

Severiano Boris "Seve" van Ass (born 10 April 1992) is a Dutch former field hockey player who played as a midfielder or forward for the Dutch national team.

== Personal life ==
He is the son of Dutch field hockey coach Paul van Ass.

== International career ==
He participated at the 2016 Summer Olympics. In June 2019, he was selected in the Netherlands squad for the 2019 EuroHockey Championship and was named the captain for the tournament. They won the bronze medal by defeating Germany 4–0. After the winning final at the 2024 Summer Olympics, he announced his retirement.

== Club career ==
Van Ass started playing hockey at Victoria, a field hockey club in Rotterdam. In 2008 he switched to HGC, with whom he won the 2010–11 Euro Hockey League. In 2013 he returned to Rotterdam to play for HC Rotterdam, where he played for five seasons until 2018 when he returned to HGC. In his last season before his retirement HGC was relegated from the Hoofdklasse.
