= Thijs van Dam =

Dutch field hockey player

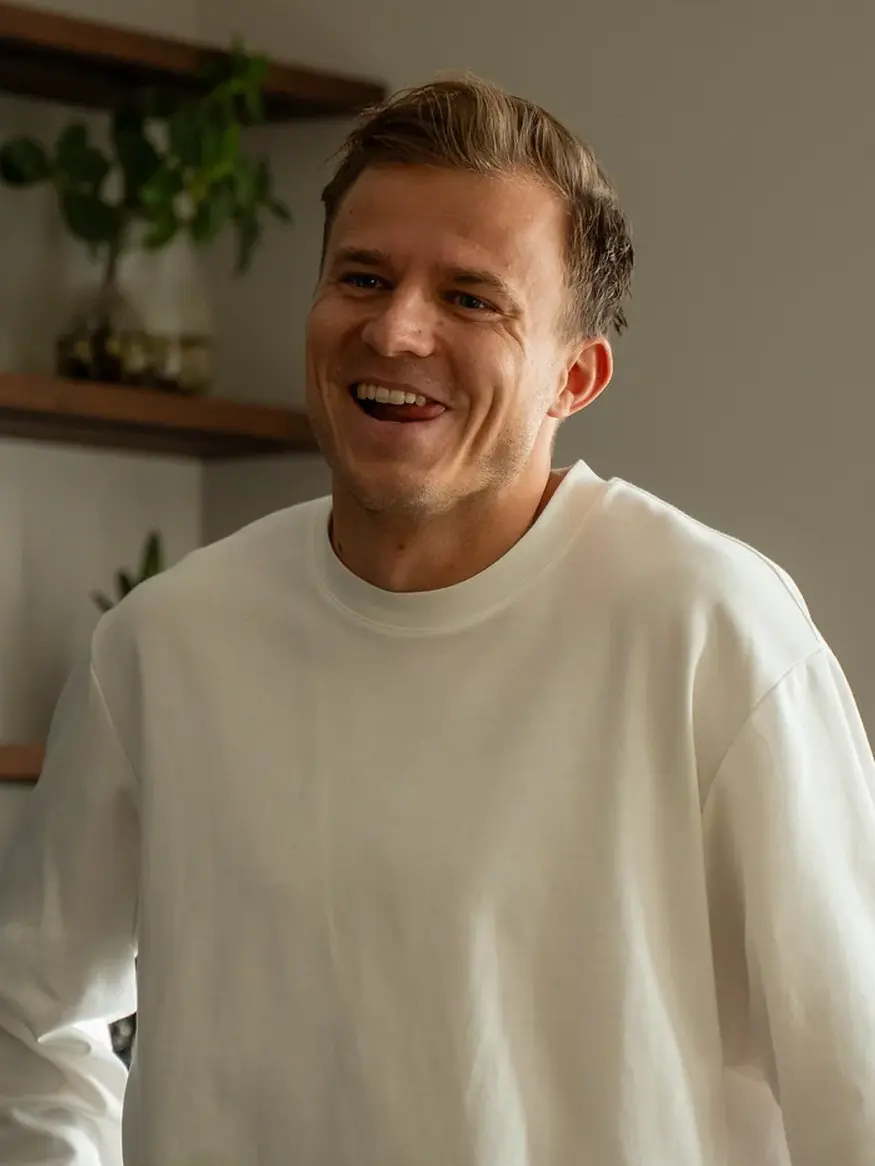
- Thijs van Dam in a commercial in 2026

Personal information
- Full name: Thijs Johannes; Reinier van Dam
- Born: 5 January 1997 (age 29) Delft, Netherlands

Sport
- Sport: Field hockey
- Position: Forward
- Club: Rotterdam
Youth career
- Team
- –: Ring Pass Delft
- –: Rotterdam
Senior career
Years	Team	Caps	Goals
–	Rotterdam	-	-
National team
Years	Team	Caps	Goals
2016–	Netherlands (indoor)	5	(2)
2016–2017	Netherlands U21	14	(4)
2017–	Netherlands	54	(7)
Medal record
Men's field hockey
Representing the Netherlands
Olympic Games
Gold medal – first place	2024 Paris	Team
World Cup
Silver medal – second place	2018 Bhubaneswar
Bronze medal – third place	2023 Bhubaneswar/Rourkela
European Championship
Gold medal – first place	2021 Amstelveen
Gold medal – first place	2023 Mönchengladbach
Silver medal – second place	2025 Mönchengladbach
Champions Trophy
Bronze medal – third place	2018 Breda
EuroHockey Junior Championship
Gold medal – first place	2017 Valencia

Thijs Johannes Reinier van Dam (Dutch pronunciation: [ˈtɛis fɑn ˈdɑm]; born 5 January 1997) is a Dutch professional field hockey player who plays as a forward for Rotterdam and the Dutch national team.

== Club career ==
Born in Delft, van Dam started playing at Ring Pass Delft. After the under 14s, he switched to Rotterdam where he currently still plays in the first team.

== International career ==
Van Dam's first international match was for the Dutch national indoor hockey team at the 2016 EuroHockey Indoor Championship, where they finished seventh. In November 2016, van Dam was selected for the 2016 Junior World Cup, where the team finished seventh. He made his debut for the senior national team in a test match in Cape Town, South Africa. He was not selected for the 2017 EuroHockey Championship so he played at the 2017 EuroHockey Junior Championship. He was part of the Dutch team that won the silver medal at the 2018 World Cup. Due to a hip operation, he had to mis the 2019 Pro League.
