= HC Rotterdam =

Dutch field hockey club

Rotterdam
- Full name: Hockey Club Rotterdam
- Short name: HCR
- League: Men's Hoofdklasse; Women's Hoofdklasse
- Founded: 16 September 1925; 100 years ago
- Home ground: Hazelaarweg Stadion, Rotterdam (Capacity 3,500)

Personnel
- Chairman: Diederik Chevalier
- Website: Club website
| Home | Away |

Hockey Club Rotterdam, commonly known as Rotterdam is a Dutch professional field hockey club based in Rotterdam, South Holland. It was founded on 16 September 1925.

The first men's team competes on the highest level of the Dutch field hockey league, which is called "Hoofdklasse" and the first women's team competes in the second tier called the Promotieklasse. HC Rotterdam plays their matches in the 3,500-capacity Hazelaarweg Stadion, which also hosted the 2001 Men's Champions Trophy and the 2005 Men's Hockey Junior World Cup.

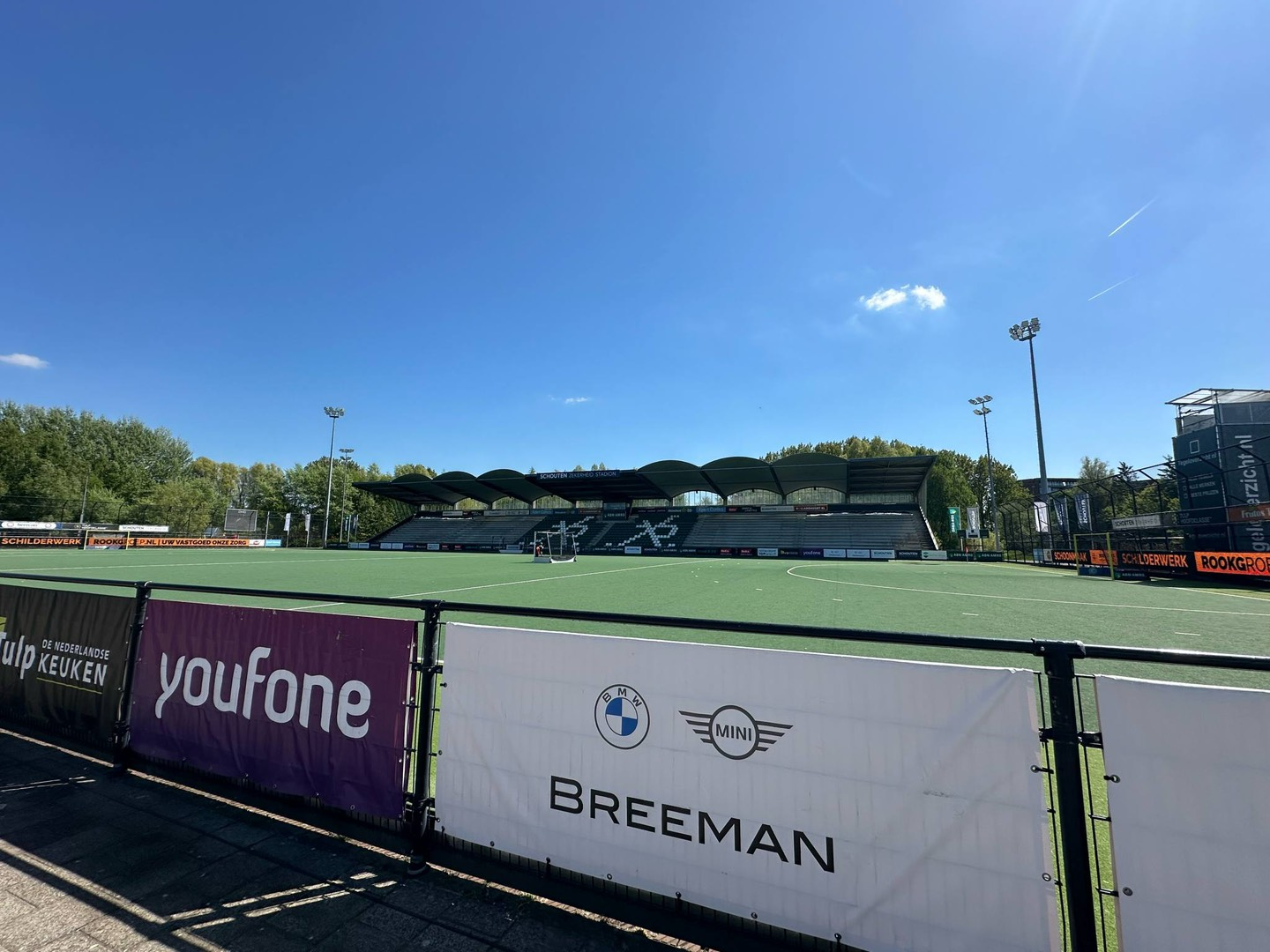
Hazelaarweg Stadion, Rotterdam

== Honours ==
=== Men ===
Hoofdklasse

- Winners (2): 2012–13, 2025–26
- Runners-up (3): 2011–12, 2016–17, 2023–24

Euro Hockey League

- Runners-up (1): 2009–10

Hoofdklasse Indoor

- Winners (3): 2007–08, 2013–14, 2023–24

EuroHockey Indoor Club Challenge I

- Winners (1): 2015

=== Women ===
Hoofdklasse

- Runners-up (2): 2000–01, 2001–02

KNHB Cup

- Winners (1): 1995

EuroHockey Cup Winners Cup

- Winners (2): 2002, 2003

Hoofdklasse Indoor

- Winners (4): 1998–99, 1999–00, 2000–01, 2024–25

EuroHockey Indoor Club Trophy

- Winners (1): 2001

EuroHockey Indoor Club Challenge I

- Winners (1): 2000

== Players ==
=== Men's squad ===
As of 13 September 2024

| No. | Pos. | Nation | Player |
|---|---|---|---|
| 1 | GK | NED | Derk Meijer |
| 2 | DF | NED | Pepijn van der Heijden |
| 3 | DF | NED | Tristan Algera |
| 5 | DF | NED | Jesse van Minde |
| 6 | DF | NED | Jesse Steenhoff |
| 7 | MF | NED | Guus Jansen |
| 8 | MF | NED | Menno Boeren |
| 9 | FW | NED | Olivier Hortensius |
| 10 | FW | NED | Thijs van Dam (Captain) |
| 11 | FW | NED | Jeroen Hertzberger |
| 12 | DF | NED | Jochem Bakker |

| No. | Pos. | Nation | Player |
|---|---|---|---|
| 13 | DF | NED | Bouwe Buitenhuis |
| 14 | FW | NED | Tjep Hoedemakers |
| 15 | MF | NED | Matthijs van der Wielen |
| 16 | DF | NED | Justen Blok |
| 18 | FW | ESP | Joaquín Menini |
| 19 | DF | ESP | Marc Recasens |
| 20 | FW | NED | Dylan Lucieer |
| 22 | FW | NED | Timme van der Heijden |
| 24 | MF | NED | Steijn van Heijningen |
| 29 | GK | NED | Ole Dorscheidt |

=== Notable players ===
==== Men's internationals ====
Netherlands

- Seve van Ass
- Pirmin Blaak
- Thijs van Dam
- Jeroen Hertzberger
- Robert van der Horst
- Hidde Turkstra

Australia

- Mark Knowles

Belgium

- Jeffrey Thys

Canada

- Ranjeev Deol
- Peter Short
- Rob Short

Great Britain/England

- Alastair Brogdon
- Adam Dixon
- Harry Martin

Ireland

- Michael Darling
- Sean Murray

New Zealand

- Ryan Archibald
- Phil Burrows
- Simon Child
- Blair Tarrant
- Nick Wilson

Pakistan

- Sohail Abbas
- Waseem Ahmed

==== Women's internationals ====
Netherlands

- Fleur van de Kieft
- Mignonne Meekels
- Fatima Moreira de Melo
- Caroline van Nieuwenhuyze-Leenders
- Janneke Schopman
- Jacqueline Toxopeus
- Maria Verschoor

Argentina

- Jimena Cedrés
- Cecilia Rognoni

Australia

- Kate Hollywood

Great Britain/England

- Susie Gilbert
- Helen Grant
- Beth Storry

Great Britain/Wales

- Sarah Thomas
