= Phil Ball =

Phil or Philip Ball may refer to:

- Phil Ball (writer) (born 1957), British writer based in Spain
- Phil Ball (baseball) (1864–1932), owner of the St. Louis Terriers
- Philip Ball (born 1962), English science writer
- Phil Ball (American football) (1925–2008), college football coach
