= Men's FIH Hockey World Cup =

International field hockey tournament

- Most recent season or competition: 2026 Men's FIH Hockey World Cup
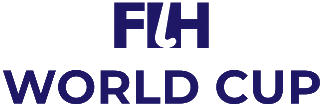
- Sport: Field hockey
- Founded: 1971; 55 years ago
- First season: 1971
- No. of teams: 16
- Region: International (FIH)
- Most recent champion: Germany (4th title) (2026)
- Most titles: Germany; Pakistan (4 titles)
- Website: fih.hockey/world-cup

The Men's FIH Hockey World Cup is an international field hockey competition organised by the International Hockey Federation (FIH). The tournament was started in 1971. It is held every four years, bridging the four years between the Summer Olympics. As of the 2026 edition, only 6 nations have won the World Cup, with Germany and Pakistan being the most successful teams, both having won the tournament four times. The Netherlands and Australia have each won three titles, while Belgium and India have both won the tournament once.

The 2026 tournament took place in the Netherlands and Belgium from 15 to 30 of August. Germany defeated Spain in the final 1-0 to win their 4th title and 2nd in a row.

== History ==
The Hockey World Cup was first conceived by Pakistan's Air Marshal Nur Khan. He proposed his idea to the FIH through Patrick Rowley, the first editor of World Hockey magazine. Their idea was approved on 26 October 1969 and adopted by the FIH Council at a meeting in Brussels on 12 April 1970. The FIH decided that the inaugural World Cup would be held in October 1971, in Pakistan.

However, political issues would prevent that first competition from being played in Pakistan. The FIH had inadvertently scheduled the first World Cup to be played in Pakistan during the Bangladesh Liberation War. Furthermore, Pakistan and India had been at war with each other only six years earlier. When Pakistan invited India to compete in the tournament, a crisis arose. Pakistanis, led by cricketer Abdul Hafeez Kardar, protested against India's participation in the Hockey World Cup.

Given the intense political climate between Pakistan and India, the FIH decided to move the tournament elsewhere. In March 1971, coincidentally in the same month Bangladesh declared independence from Pakistan, the FIH decided to move the first Hockey World Cup to the Real Club de Polo grounds in Barcelona, Spain, which was considered a neutral and peaceful European site.

The FIH has set no requirements or limitations on the size of the competition. The 1971 Cup included only ten nations, the smallest World Cup. The 1978 Cup featured fourteen nations. The 2002, 2018 and 2023 Cups featured sixteen nations. The remaining 10 World Cups have featured 12 nations.

The first three tournaments were held every two years. The 1978 Cup was the only tournament held three years from the previous one. It was halfway between the Summer Olympics hockey competition and has continued that way. In other words, the tournament has been held every four years ever since.

== Trophy ==
The Hockey World Cup trophy was designed by Bashir Moojid and created by the Pakistani Army. On 27 March 1971, in Brussels, the trophy was formally handed to FIH President Rene Frank by Mr Muhammad Masood, the Pakistani Ambassador to Belgium. The trophy consists of a silver cup with an intricate floral design, surmounted by a globe of the world in silver and gold, placed on a high blade base inlaid with ivory. At its peak is a model hockey stick and ball. Without its base, the trophy stands 120.85 mm (4.758 in) high. Including the base, the trophy stands 650 mm (26 in). It weighs 11,560 g (408 oz), including 895 g (31.6 oz) of gold, 6,815 g (240.4 oz) of silver, 350 g (12 oz) of ivory and 3,500 g (120 oz) of teak.

== Format ==
The Hockey World Cup consists of a qualification stage and a final tournament stage. The format for each stage is the same.

=== Qualification ===
The qualification stage has been a part of the Hockey World Cup since 1977. All participating teams play in the qualification round. The teams divide into two or more pools and compete for a berth in the final tournament. The top two teams are automatically qualified and the rest of the berths are decided in playoffs.

=== Final tournament ===
The final tournament features the continental champions and other qualified teams. Sometimes it also features the winners of the Summer Olympics' hockey competition or the continental runners-up. The teams divide into pools once more and play a round robin tournament. The composition of the pools is determined using the current FIH World Rankings.

== Results ==
=== Summaries ===
#	Year	Host	Final			Third place match			Teams
#	Year	Host	Winner (gold)	Score	Runner-up (silver)	Third place (bronze)	Score	Fourth place	Teams
1	1971; Details	Barcelona, Spain	Pakistan	1–0	Spain	India	2–1	Kenya	10
2	1973; Details	Amstelveen, Netherlands	Netherlands	2–2 (4–2); Penalty strokes	India	West Germany	1–0	Pakistan	12
3	1975; Details	Kuala Lumpur, Malaysia	India	2–1	Pakistan	West Germany	4–0	Malaysia	12
4	1978; Details	Buenos Aires, Argentina	Pakistan	3–2	Netherlands	Australia	4–3	West Germany	14
5	1982; Details	Bombay, India	Pakistan	3–1	West Germany	Australia	4–2	Netherlands	12
6	1986; Details	London, England	Australia	2–1	England	West Germany	3–2	Soviet Union	12
7	1990; Details	Lahore, Pakistan	Netherlands	3–1	Pakistan	Australia	2–1	West Germany	12
8	1994; Details	Sydney, Australia	Pakistan	1–1 (4–3); Penalty strokes	Netherlands	Australia	5–2	Germany	12
9	1998; Details	Utrecht, Netherlands	Netherlands	3–2	Spain	Germany	1–0	Australia	12
10	2002; Details	Kuala Lumpur, Malaysia	Germany	2–1	Australia	Netherlands	2–1	South Korea	16
11	2006; Details	Mönchengladbach, Germany	Germany	4–3	Australia	Spain	3–2	South Korea	12
12	2010; Details	New Delhi, India	Australia	2–1	Germany	Netherlands	4–3	England	12
13	2014; Details	The Hague, Netherlands	Australia	6–1	Netherlands	Argentina	2–0	England	12
14	2018; Details	Bhubaneswar, India	Belgium	0–0 (3–2); Penalty shootout	Netherlands	Australia	8–1	England	16
15	2023; Details	Odisha, India	Germany	3–3 (5–4); Penalty shootout	Belgium	Netherlands	3–1	Australia	16
16	2026; Details	Wavre, Belgium; Amstelveen, Netherlands	Germany	1–0	Spain	Argentina	2–1	Netherlands	16

=== Successful national teams ===
Twenty seven teams have qualified for a Hockey World Cup. Of these, thirteen teams have made it to the semifinals. Eight teams have made it through to the finals.

To date, the most successful teams are Germany and Pakistan with four titles each, followed by the Netherlands and Australia with three titles each, while India and Belgium won their lone titles in 1975 and 2018 respectively.

Below is a list of teams that have finished in the top four positions in the tournament:

Teams reaching the top four
Team	Champions	Runners-up	Third place	Fourth place
Germany^	4 (2002, 2006*, 2023, 2026)	2 (1982, 2010)	4 (1973, 1975, 1986, 1998)	3 (1978, 1990, 1994)
Pakistan	4 (1971, 1978, 1982, 1994)	2 (1975, 1990*)		1 (1973)
Netherlands	3 (1973*, 1990, 1998*)	4 (1978, 1994, 2014*, 2018)	3 (2002, 2010, 2023)	2 (1982, 2026*)
Australia	3 (1986, 2010, 2014)	2 (2002, 2006)	5 (1978, 1982, 1990, 1994*, 2018)	2 (1998, 2023)
India	1 (1975)	1 (1973)	1 (1971)	
Belgium	1 (2018)	1 (2023)		
Spain		3 (1971*, 1998, 2026)	1 (2006)	
England		1 (1986*)		3 (2010, 2014, 2018)
Argentina			2 (2014, 2026)	
South Korea				2 (2002, 2006)
Kenya				1 (1971)
Malaysia				1 (1975*)
Soviet Union#				1 (1986)

* = host country
^ = includes results representing West Germany between 1971 and 1990
# = states that have since split into two or more independent countries

=== Performance by host nations ===
Nine nations have hosted the Hockey World Cup. Only the Netherlands (1973 and 1998) and Germany (2006) have won the tournament as hosts. Spain, England, and Pakistan emerged as host runners-up in the 1971, 1986 and 1990 tournaments. Australia placed third when it hosted the 1994 tournament in Sydney.

=== Performance by continental zones ===
To date, the finals of the Hockey World Cup have been contested by Asian, European and Oceania continental teams. European teams have won the most with eight titles, followed by Asian teams with five titles. Australia is the only team from Oceania to win the tournament. Neither the Americas nor Africa have ever won the title.

Continent	Best performance
Europe	8 titles, won by Germany (4), the Netherlands (3), and Belgium (1)
Asia	5 titles, won by Pakistan (4) and India (1)
Oceania	3 titles, won by Australia
Americas	Third place (Argentina, 2014)
Africa	Fourth place (Kenya, 1971)

== Team appearances ==
Team	(Spain) 1971	(Netherlands) 1973	(Malaysia) 1975	(Argentina) 1978	(India) 1982	(England) 1986	(Pakistan) 1990	(Australia) 1994	(Netherlands) 1998	(Malaysia) 2002	(Germany) 2006	(India) 2010	(Netherlands) 2014	(India) 2018	(India) 2023	(Belgium) (Netherlands) 2026	Total
Argentina	10th	9th	11th	8th	12th	6th	9th	7th	–	6th	10th	7th	3rd	7th	9th	3rd	15
Australia	8th	–	5th	3rd	3rd	1st	3rd	3rd	4th	2nd	2nd	1st	1st	3rd	4th	5th	15
Belarus	Part of the Soviet Union							12th	–	–	–	–	–	–	–	–	1
Belgium	–	8th	–	14th	–	–	–	11th	–	14th	–	–	5th	1st	2nd	7th	8
Canada	–	–	–	11th	–	10th	11th	–	8th	–	–	11th	–	11th	–	–	6
Chile	–	–	–	–	–	–	–	–	–	–	–	–	–	–	15th	–	1
China	–	–	–	–	–	–	–	–	–	–	–	–	–	10th	–	–	1
Cuba	–	–	–	–	–	–	–	–	–	16th	–	–	–	–	–	–	1
England	–	6th	6th	7th	8th	2nd	5th	6th	6th	7th	5th	4th	4th	4th	5th	6th	15
France	7th	–	–	–	–	–	7th	–	–	–	–	–	–	8th	13th	13th	5
Germany^	5th	3rd	3rd	4th	2nd	3rd	4th	4th	3rd	1st	1st	2nd	6th	5th	1st	1st	16
Ghana	–	–	12th	–	–	–	–	–	–	–	–	–	–	–	–	–	1
India	3rd	2nd	1st	6th	5th	12th	10th	5th	9th	10th	11th	8th	9th	6th	9th	8th	16
Ireland	–	–	–	12th	–	–	12th	–	–	–	–	–	–	14th	–	10th	4
Italy	–	–	–	13th	–	–	–	–	–	–	–	–	–	–	–	–	1
Japan	9th	10th	–	–	–	–	–	–	–	12th	9th	–	–	–	15th	14th	6
Kenya	4th	12th	–	–	–	–	–	–	–	–	–	–	–	–	–	–	2
Malaysia	–	11th	4th	10th	10th	–	–	–	11th	8th	–	–	12th	15th	13th	16th	10
Netherlands	6th	1st	9th	2nd	4th	7th	1st	2nd	1st	3rd	7th	3rd	2nd	2nd	3rd	4th	16
New Zealand	–	7th	7th	–	7th	9th	–	–	10th	9th	8th	9th	7th	9th	7th	9th	12
Pakistan	1st	4th	2nd	1st	1st	11th	2nd	1st	5th	5th	6th	12th	–	12th	–	11th	14
Poland	–	–	10th	9th	8th	8th	–	–	12th	15th	–	–	–	–	–	–	6
South Africa	–	–	–	–	–	–	–	10th	–	13th	12th	10th	11th	16th	11th	12th	8
South Korea	–	–	–	–	–	–	–	8th	7th	4th	4th	6th	10th	–	8th	–	7
Soviet Union#	–	–	–	–	6th	4th	6th	Defunct									3
Spain	2nd	5th	8th	5th	11th	5th	8th	9th	2nd	11th	3rd	5th	8th	13th	6th	2nd	16
Wales	–	–	–	–	–	–	–	–	–	–	–	–	–	–	11th	15th	2
Total	10	12	12	14	12	12	12	12	12	16	12	12	12	16	16	16	

^ = includes results representing West Germany between 1971 and 1990
# = states that have since split into two or more independent nations

Germany, India, the Netherlands and Spain are the only teams to have competed at each World Cup; 27 teams have competed in at least one World Cup.

== Debut of teams ==
Year	Debuting teams			Successor and renamed teams
Year	Teams	No.	CT	Successor and renamed teams
1971	Argentina, Australia, France, India, Japan, Kenya, Netherlands, Pakistan, Spain, West Germany^	10	10	
1973	Belgium, England, Malaysia, New Zealand	4	14	
1975	Ghana, Poland	2	16	
1978	Canada, Ireland, Italy	3	19	
1982	Soviet Union#	1	20	
1986		0	20	
1990		0	20	
1994	Belarus#, South Africa, South Korea	3	23	Germany
1998		0	23	
2002	Cuba	1	24	
2006		0	24	
2010		0	24	
2014		0	24	
2018	China	1	25	
2023	Wales, Chile	2	27	
2026		0	27	

^ = Germany is a successor of West Germany and not a separate team.
# = Belarus was a part of Soviet Union but not successor, hence Belarus is a new separate entity.

Total number of teams which have participated in the World Cups through 2026 is 27, using FIH's view on successor teams

== See also ==
- Field hockey at the Summer Olympics
- Men's FIH Hockey Junior World Cup
- Men's FIH Indoor Hockey World Cup
- Women's FIH Indoor Hockey World Cup
- Women's FIH Hockey World Cup
- Women's FIH Hockey Junior World Cup
- FIH Para Hockey World Cup
