= 2021–22 Men's FIH Pro League squads =

This article lists the squads of all participating teams in the 2021–22 FIH Pro League. The nine national teams involved in the tournament were required to register a squad of a minimum of 20 players who will take part in the competition.

Age, caps and club for each player are as of 16 October 2021, the first day of the season.

== Argentina ==
The following is the Argentina squad for the 2021–22 FIH Pro League.

Head coach: Mariano Ronconi

No.	Pos.	Player	Date of birth (age)	Caps	Club
1	GK	Tomás Santiago	15 June 1992 (aged 29)	24	(Belgium) Gantoise
2	GK	Nehuén Hernando	23 June 2000 (aged 21)	0	(Argentina) Ducilo
3	GK	Emiliano Bosso	3 December 1995 (aged 25)	6	(Argentina) GEBA
5	FW	Facundo Zárate	31 July 2000 (aged 21)	0	(Argentina) Jockey Club Córdoba
6	MF	Santiago Tarazona	31 May 1996 (aged 25)	65	(Spain) Real Club de Polo
7	FW	Nicolás Keenan	6 May 1997 (aged 24)	37	(Netherlands) Klein Zwitserland
8	MF	Nahuel Salis	6 August 1989 (aged 32)	87	(Belgium) Daring
9	FW	Maico Casella	6 May 1997 (aged 24)	83	(Netherlands) Tilburg
12	FW	Lucas Vila	23 August 1986 (aged 35)	262	(Spain) Benalmádena
13	DF	Leandro Tolini	14 March 1990 (aged 31)	82	(Netherlands) Tilburg
15	MF	Diego Paz	10 August 1992 (aged 29)	42	(France) Lille
16	MF	Ignacio Ortiz	26 July 1987 (aged 34)	180	(Argentina) Banco Provincia
18	DF	Federico Monja	12 September 1993 (aged 28)	16	(Belgium) Léopold
19	MF	Ignacio Nepote	30 June 1997 (aged 24)	0	(Belgium) Herakles
22	MF	Matías Rey	1 December 1984 (aged 36)	223	(Argentina) San Fernando
23	FW	Lucas Martínez	17 November 1993 (aged 27)	83	(Belgium) Dragons
24	DF	Nicolás Cicileo	1 October 1993 (aged 28)	64	(Belgium) Daring
25	MF	Nicolás Acosta	7 July 1996 (aged 25)	11	(Germany) Crefelder HTC
26	MF	Agustín Mazzilli	20 June 1989 (aged 32)	232	(Belgium) Braxgata
27		Agustín Machelett	31 January 1995 (aged 26)	0	(Spain) Tenis
28	MF	Federico Fernández	28 February 1992 (aged 29)	49	(Netherlands) Tilburg
29	MF	Thomas Habif	27 May 1996 (aged 25)	16	(Germany) Harvestehuder THC
30	MF	Agustín Bugallo	23 April 1995 (aged 26)	86	(Belgium) Gantoise
31	MF	Lucas Toscani	22 November 1999 (aged 21)	8	(Germany) Uhlenhorst Mülheim
32	FW	Martín Ferreiro	21 October 1997 (aged 23)	55	(Belgium) Gantoise

== Belgium ==
The following is the Belgium squad for the 2021–22 FIH Pro League.

Head coach: (Netherlands) Michel van den Heuvel

No.	Pos.	Player	Date of birth (age)	Caps	Club
1	GK	Simon Vandenbroucke	6 June 1999 (aged 22)	3	(Belgium) Waterloo Ducks
2	GK	Loic Van Doren	14 September 1996 (aged 25)	29	(Belgium) Dragons
3	FW	Thibeau Stockbroekx	20 July 2000 (aged 21)	7	(Netherlands) Oranje-Rood
4	DF	Arthur Van Doren	1 October 1994 (aged 27)	205	(Netherlands) Bloemendaal
5	DF	Nicolas Poncelet	19 September 1996 (aged 25)	21	(Netherlands) Amsterdam
7	MF	John-John Dohmen	24 January 1988 (aged 33)	416	(Belgium) Orée
8	FW	Florent Van Aubel	25 October 1991 (aged 29)	254	(Belgium) Dragons
9	FW	Sébastien Dockier	28 December 1989 (aged 31)	216	(Netherlands) Pinoké
10	FW	Cédric Charlier	27 November 1987 (aged 33)	336	(Belgium) Racing
11	FW	Tommy Willems	13 April 1997 (aged 24)	7	(Belgium) Waterloo Ducks
12	DF	Gauthier Boccard	26 August 1991 (aged 30)	241	(Belgium) Waterloo Ducks
13	FW	Nicolas De Kerpel	23 March 1993 (aged 28)	77	(Belgium) Herakles
14	MF	Augustin Meurmans	29 May 1997 (aged 24)	73	(Belgium) Racing
15	DF	Emmanuel Stockbroekx	23 December 1993 (aged 27)	162	(Belgium) Orée
16	DF	Alexander Hendrickx	6 August 1993 (aged 28)	147	(Netherlands) Pinoké
19	MF	Félix Denayer (Captain)	31 January 1990 (aged 31)	342	(Belgium) Dragons
20	FW	William Ghislain	28 July 1999 (aged 22)	6	(Belgium) Waterloo Ducks
21	GK	Vincent Vanasch	21 December 1987 (aged 33)	252	(Germany) Rot-Weiss Köln
22	MF	Simon Gougnard	17 January 1991 (aged 30)	299	(Belgium) Dragons
23	DF	Arthur De Sloover	3 May 1997 (aged 24)	104	(Belgium) Beerschot
24	MF	Antoine Kina	13 February 1996 (aged 25)	87	(Belgium) Gantoise
25	DF	Loïck Luypaert	19 August 1991 (aged 30)	262	(Belgium) Braxgata
26	MF	Victor Wegnez	25 December 1995 (aged 25)	109	(Belgium) Racing
27	FW	Tom Boon	25 January 1990 (aged 31)	308	(Belgium) Léopold
29	DF	Maxime Van Oost	2 December 1999 (aged 21)	4	(Belgium) Waterloo Ducks
32	FW	Tanguy Cosyns	29 June 1991 (aged 30)	142	(Belgium) Racing

== England ==
The following is the England squad for the 2021–22 FIH Pro League.

Head coach: Zak Jones

No.	Pos.	Player	Date of birth (age)	Caps	Club
2		Nicholas Park	8 April 1999 (aged 22)	4	(England) Surbiton
3		Jack Waller	28 January 1997 (aged 25)	62	(Belgium) Gantoise
4		Edward Way	12 August 1998 (aged 23)	0	
5		David Ames	25 June 1989 (aged 32)	172	(Netherlands) Oranje-Rood
6		Henry Weir	13 February 1990 (aged 32)	185	(England) Old Georgians
7		Zachary Wallace	29 September 1999 (aged 22)	63	(Netherlands) HGC
9		Harry Martin	23 October 1992 (aged 29)	238	(England) Hampstead & Westminster
10		Chris Griffiths	3 September 1990 (aged 31)	118	(England) Old Georgians
11		Ian Sloan	19 November 1993 (aged 28)	137	(England) Wimbledon
12		James Gall	20 May 1995 (aged 26)	96	(England) Surbiton
13		Sam Ward	24 December 1990 (aged 31)	143	(England) Old Georgians
14		James Albery	2 October 1995 (aged 26)	12	(England) Old Georgians
15		Phil Roper	24 January 1992 (aged 30)	163	(England) Chester HC
16		James Mazarelo	4 February 2001 (aged 21)	1	(England) Loughborough Students
17		Stuart Rushmere	1 January 2000 (aged 22)	2	(England) Loughborough Students
18		Brendan Creed	3 January 1993 (aged 29)	95	(Belgium) Beerschot
19		David Goodfield	15 June 1993 (aged 28)	64	(England) Surbiton
20		Ollie Payne	6 April 1999 (aged 22)	20	(England) Holcombe
21		Liam Ansell	12 November 1993 (aged 28)	61	(England) Wimbledon
22		David Condon	6 July 1991 (aged 30)	185	(England) Wimbledon
23		Nick Bandurak	14 December 1992 (aged 29)	4	(England) Holcombe
24		James Oates	18 April 1998 (aged 23)	2	(England) Hampstead & Westminster
25		Duncan Scott	31 August 1998 (aged 23)	4	
26		Taylor Seager-Green	29 April 2000 (aged 21)	0	
27		Liam Sanford	14 March 1996 (aged 26)	78	(England) Old Georgians
28		Edward Horler	22 September 1995 (aged 26)	8	
29		Tom Sorsby	28 October 1996 (aged 25)	49	(England) Surbiton
30		Rhys Smith	13 March 1997 (aged 25)	19	(England) Wimbledon
31		Will Calnan	17 April 1996 (aged 25)	43	(England) Hampstead & Westminster
32		Peter Scott	19 January 1997 (aged 25)	7	(England) Wimbledon
40		Jack Turner	26 March 1997 (aged 25)	6	(England) Wimbledon
41		Timothy Nurse	11 May 1999 (aged 22)	2	
42		Thomas Russell	10 April 2000 (aged 21)	0	
46		Samuel Taylor	12 June 2001 (aged 20)	3	

== France ==
The following is the France squad for the 2021–22 FIH Pro League.

Head coach: Frederic Soyez

No.	Pos.	Player	Date of birth (age)	Caps	Club
1	GK	Arthur Thieffry	15 September 1989 (aged 32)	79	(Belgium) Orée
2	MF	Mathis Clément	30 August 2002 (aged 19)	0	(France) Montrouge
3	DF	Mattéo Desgouillons	21 January 2000 (aged 21)	11	(Belgium) Gantoise
4	FW	Pieter van Straaten	23 October 1992 (aged 28)	97	(Belgium) Waterloo Ducks
5	DF	Stanislas Branicki	9 April 2002 (aged 19)	1	(Belgium) Orée
6	MF	Gaspard Xavier	10 May 2002 (aged 19)	0	(Belgium) Racing Club de Bruxelles
8	MF	Simon Martin-Brisac	20 November 1992 (aged 28)	119	Racing Club de France
9	FW	Blaise Rogeau	26 November 1994 (aged 26)	75	(Belgium) Gantoise
10	DF	Viktor Lockwood	29 March 1992 (aged 29)	127	(France) Lille
11	MF	Charles Masson	13 April 1992 (aged 29)	104	(Belgium) Gantoise
12	DF	Amaury Bellenger	14 August 1998 (aged 23)	41	(Belgium) Orée
13	DF	Nicolas Dumont	13 December 1991 (aged 29)	87	(Belgium) Waterloo Ducks
14	FW	Gaspard Baumgarten	3 August 1992 (aged 29)	139	(Belgium) Royal Léopold
16	MF	François Goyet	4 November 1994 (aged 26)	111	(Belgium) Gantoise
17	FW	Noé Jouin	2 August 2002 (aged 19)	1	(France) Saint Germain
18	DF	Jean-Baptiste Forgues	18 May 1992 (aged 29)	153	(Belgium) Royal Léopold
19	FW	Corentin Sellier	29 May 2001 (aged 20)	6	(France) Montrouge
20	MF	Eliot Curty	18 September 1998 (aged 23)	27	(Belgium) Orée
21	FW	Etienne Tynevez	13 February 1999 (aged 22)	74	(Belgium) Gantoise
22	DF	Victor Charlet (Captain)	19 November 1993 (aged 27)	127	(Belgium) Waterloo Ducks
23	FW	Benjamin Marqué	11 August 2000 (aged 21)	6	(Belgium) Daring
26	FW	Antonin Igau	9 January 2000 (aged 21)	7	(Belgium) Antwerp
27	FW	Maximilien Branicki	16 December 1997 (aged 23)	46	(Belgium) Orée
28	MF	Timothée Clément	18 April 2000 (aged 21)	25	(Belgium) Orée
29	GK	Corentin Saunier	1 February 1994 (aged 27)	39	(France) Lille
30	DF	Brieuc Delemazure	2 April 2002 (aged 19)	0	(France) Lille
32	GK	Guillaume de Vaucelles	12 October 2001 (aged 20)	0	(France) Saint Germain

== Germany ==
The following is the Germany squad for the 2021–22 FIH Pro League.

Head coach: Kais al Saadi

No.	Pos.	Player	Date of birth (age)	Caps	Club
1	GK	Alexander Stadler	16 October 1999 (aged 22)	18	(Germany) TSV Mannheim
2	DF	Mathias Müller	3 April 1992 (aged 29)	121	(Germany) Hamburger Polo Club
3	DF	Mats Grambusch	4 November 1992 (aged 28)	161	(Germany) Rot-Weiss Köln
4	DF	Lukas Windfeder	11 May 1995 (aged 26)	132	(Germany) Uhlenhorst Mülheim
5	DF	Linus Müller	2 December 1999 (aged 21)	26	(Germany) Mannheimer HC
7	FW	Jonas Gomoll	28 January 1993 (aged 28)	46	(Germany) Berliner HC
8	MF	Paul-Philipp Kaufmann	21 June 1996 (aged 25)	21	(Netherlands) Den Bosch
9	FW	Niklas Wellen	14 December 1994 (aged 26)	159	(Netherlands) Pinoké
10	FW	Thies Prinz	7 July 1998 (aged 23)	19	(Germany) Rot-Weiss Köln
11	FW	Constantin Staib	31 August 1995 (aged 26)	89	(Germany) Hamburger Polo Club
12	FW	Timm Herzbruch	7 June 1997 (aged 24)	93	(Germany) Uhlenhorst Mülheim
13	MF	Tobias Hauke	11 September 1987 (aged 34)	334	(Germany) Harvestehuder THC
14	MF	Jan Schiffer	3 May 1998 (aged 23)	2	(Germany) Uhlenhorst Mülheim
15	MF	Luis Gill	27 November 1997 (aged 23)	2	(Germany) Berliner HC
16	DF	Paul Dösch	11 May 1998 (aged 23)	4	(Germany) Berliner HC
17	FW	Christopher Rühr	19 December 1993 (aged 27)	160	(Germany) Rot-Weiss Köln
18	DF	Ferdinand Weinke	26 January 1995 (aged 26)	64	(Germany) Uhlenhorst Mülheim
19	FW	Justus Weigand	20 April 2000 (aged 21)	13	(Germany) Mannheimer HC
20	DF	Martin Zwicker	27 February 1987 (aged 34)	257	(Germany) Berliner HC
21	DF	Benedikt Schwarzhaupt	14 January 2001 (aged 20)	6	(Germany) UHC Hamburg
22	FW	Marco Miltkau	18 August 1990 (aged 31)	113	(Netherlands) Klein Zwitserland
23	FW	Florian Fuchs	10 November 1991 (aged 29)	239	(Netherlands) Bloemendaal
24	DF	Benedikt Fürk	20 October 1988 (aged 32)	186	(Germany) Uhlenhorst Mülheim
25	DF	Teo Hinrichs	17 September 1999 (aged 22)	28	(Germany) Mannheimer HC
26	DF	Niklas Bosserhoff	15 April 1998 (aged 23)	41	(Germany) Uhlenhorst Mülheim
27	MF	Timur Oruz	27 October 1994 (aged 26)	95	(Germany) Rot-Weiss Köln
28	MF	Moritz Rothländer	10 November 1997 (aged 23)	19	(Germany) TSV Mannheim
29	DF	Johannes Große	7 January 1997 (aged 24)	75	(Germany) Rot-Weiss Köln
30	GK	Moritz Kentmann	7 December 1992 (aged 28)	0	(Netherlands) Kampong
31	FW	Malte Hellwig	23 October 1997 (aged 23)	25	(Germany) Uhlenhorst Mülheim
32	GK	Niklas Garst	25 April 1995 (aged 26)	0	(Germany) Hamburger Polo Club
34	FW	Raphael Hartkopf	24 November 1998 (aged 22)	4	(Germany) Mannheimer HC
35	FW	Hannes Müller	18 May 2000 (aged 21)	5	(Germany) UHC Hamburg
36	MF	Mario Schachner	19 September 2001 (aged 20)	3	(Germany) Mannheimer HC

== India ==
The following is the India squad for the 2021–22 FIH Pro League

Head coach: (Australia) Graham Reid

No.	Pos.	Player	Date of birth (age)	Caps	Club
12	GK	Krishan Pathak	24 April 1997 (age 27)	56	(India) Petroleum Sports Promotion Board
16	GK	P. R. Sreejesh	8 May 1988 (age 36)	244	Unattached
4	DF	Jarmanpreet Singh	18 July 1996 (age 28)	23	(India) Railway Sports Promotion Board
6	DF	Surender Kumar	23 November 1993 (age 31)	143	Food Corporation of India
13	DF	Harmanpreet Singh (Vice-captain)	6 January 1996 (age 29)	133	(India) BPCL
22	DF	Varun Kumar	25 July 1995 (age 29)	95	(India) BPCL
30	DF	Amit Rohidas	10 May 1993 (age 31)	105	(India) Railway Sports Promotion Board
80	DF	Jugraj Singh	11 December 1996 (age 28)	0	(India) Services Sports Control Board
7	MF	Manpreet Singh (Captain)	26 June 1992 (age 32)	283	(India) Punjab Armed Police
8	MF	Hardik Singh	23 September 1998 (age 26)	53	(India) Indian Oil Corporation
18	MF	Nilakanta Sharma	2 May 1995 (age 29)	67	(India) Railway Sports Promotion Board
21	MF	Shamsher Singh	29 July 1997 (age 27)	19	(India) Punjab National Bank
28	MF	Jaskaran Singh	27 January 1994 (age 31)	11	(India) Punjab and Sind Bank
32	MF	Vivek Prasad	25 February 2000 (age 25)	70	(India) BPCL
2	FW	Dilpreet Singh	12 November 1999 (age 25)	58	India Oil Corporation
11	FW	Mandeep Singh	25 January 1995 (age 30)	166	(India) ONCG
14	FW	Lalit Upadhyay	1 December 1993 (age 31)	119	(India) Bharat Petroleum Corporation
27	FW	Akashdeep Singh	2 December 1994 (age 30)	199	(India) Punjab Armed Police
50	FW	Abhishek	15 August 1999 (age 25)	0	(India) Punjab National Bank
99	FW	Shilanand Lakra	5 May 1999 (age 25)	18	(India) BPCL

== Netherlands ==
The following is the Netherlands squad for the 2021–22 FIH Pro League.

Head coach: Jeroen Delmee

No.	Pos.	Player	Date of birth (age)	Caps	Club
1	GK	Maurits Visser	8 June 1995 (aged 26)	6	(Netherlands) Bloemendaal
3	DF	Imre Vos	20 November 1996 (aged 24)	0	(Netherlands) Den Bosch
4	DF	Lars Balk	26 February 1996 (aged 25)	79	(Netherlands) Kampong
5	DF	Tim Swaen	28 August 1991 (aged 30)	0	(Netherlands) Bloemendaal
6	MF	Jonas de Geus	29 April 1998 (aged 23)	95	(Netherlands) Kampong
7	FW	Thijs van Dam	5 January 1997 (aged 24)	62	(Netherlands) Rotterdam
8	FW	Thierry Brinkman	19 March 1995 (aged 26)	119	(Netherlands) Bloemendaal
10	MF	Jorrit Croon	9 August 1998 (aged 23)	93	(Netherlands) Bloemendaal
11	FW	Terrance Pieters	14 December 1996 (aged 24)	18	(Netherlands) Kampong
12	DF	Sander de Wijn	2 May 1990 (aged 31)	161	(Netherlands) Kampong
13	FW	Dennis Warmerdam	6 August 1994 (aged 27)	0	(Netherlands) Pinoké
16	DF	Floris Wortelboer	4 August 1996 (aged 25)	56	(Netherlands) Bloemendaal
17	FW	Jelle Galema	16 November 1992 (aged 28)	76	(Netherlands) Oranje-Rood
18	DF	Teun Beins	28 October 1998 (aged 22)	7	(Netherlands) Bloemendaal
19	FW	Tjep Hoedemakers	14 October 1999 (aged 22)	0	(Netherlands) Rotterdam
20	GK	Derk Meijer	12 May 1997 (aged 24)	0	(Netherlands) Rotterdam
22	FW	Koen Bijen	27 July 1998 (aged 23)	0	(Netherlands) Den Bosch
23	DF	Joep de Mol	10 December 1995 (aged 25)	94	(Netherlands) Oranje-Rood
24	MF	Steijn van Heijningen	28 January 1997 (aged 24)	0	(Netherlands) HGC
26	GK	Pirmin Blaak	8 March 1988 (aged 33)	114	(Netherlands) Oranje-Rood
27	DF	Jip Janssen	14 October 1997 (aged 24)	51	(Netherlands) Kampong
29	MF	Tijmen Reijenga		0	(Netherlands) Den Bosch
31	DF	Jasper Brinkman	10 January 1997 (aged 24)	0	(Netherlands) Bloemendaal
32	DF	Justen Blok	27 September 2000 (aged 21)	13	(Netherlands) Rotterdam
34	MF	Derck de Vilder	23 November 1998 (aged 22)	8	(Netherlands) Kampong

== South Africa ==
The following is the South Africa squad for the 2021–22 FIH Pro League.

Head coach: Garreth Ewing

No.	Pos.	Player	Date of birth (age)	Caps	Club
2	FW	Mustaphaa Cassiem	19 March 2002 (aged 19)	13	(Germany) Gladbacher HTC
3	DF	Tyson Dlungwana	18 February 1997 (aged 24)	54	(South Africa) Phoenix
4		Rusten Abrahams	16 December 1997 (aged 24)	15	
5	MF	Senzwesihle Ngubane	5 August 2001 (aged 20)	4	
6	MF	Owen Mvimbi	5 January 1988 (aged 33)	53	(South Africa) Jeppe
7	MF	Timothy Drummond	5 March 1988 (aged 33)	154	(Netherlands) HDM
8	MF	Nduduzo Lembethe	13 January 1996 (age 29)	42	(Republic of Ireland) YMCA Hockey Club
9		Bradley Sherwood	25 May 1999 (aged 22)	4	(South Africa) Tuks
10	FW	Keenan Horne	17 June 1992 (aged 29)	73	(South Africa) Central
11		Thabang Modise	9 September 1996 (aged 25)	0	
12		Le-Neal Jackson	30 September 1994 (aged 27)	12	
13		Matthew Guise-Brown	13 September 1991 (aged 30)	48	(England) Hampstead & Westminster
14	GK	Estiaan Kriek	7 June 1995 (aged 26)	5	
15	FW	Richard Pautz	25 October 1991 (aged 29)	35	(South Africa) Old Edwardian Society
16		Matthew De Sousa	17 May 1995 (aged 26)	15	
17		Daniel Sibbald	11 November 1994 (aged 26)	44	
18	MF	Taine Paton (Captain)	4 January 1989 (aged 32)	124	(Belgium) Antwerp
19		Ignatius Malgraff	17 February 1993 (aged 28)	71	
20		Clayton Saker	23 August 1999 (aged 22)	0	(South Africa) Maties
21	DF	Jethro Eustice	1 November 1989 (aged 31)	137	(Germany) Nürnberger HTC
22	DF	Daniel Bell	28 September 1994 (aged 27)	63	(Belgium) Royal Daring
24	MF	Nicholas Spooner	28 August 1991 (aged 30)	35	(Germany) Harvestehuder THC
25	DF	Matthew Brown	1 September 1992 (aged 29)	13	
26	GK	Siya Nolutshungu	21 December 1995 (aged 25)	32	
27	FW	Nqobile Ntuli	15 January 1996 (aged 25)	67	(Germany) Harvestehuder THC
28		Trevor de Lora	20 March 2000 (aged 22)	4	
29		Samkelo Mvimbi	23 January 1999 (aged 23)	23	(South Africa) Tuks
30	FW	Dayaan Cassiem	1 December 1998 (aged 22)	43	(Germany) Gladbacher HTC
31		Ryan Julius	19 June 1995 (aged 26)	50	
32	GK	Gowan Jones	24 June 1989 (aged 32)	52	
35		Connor Beauchamp	20 June 1997 (aged 24)	0	(England) Reading
36		Chad Futcher	30 October 1997 (aged 24)	9	

== Spain ==
The following is the Spain squad for the 2021–22 FIH Pro League.

Head coach: (Argentina) Max Caldas

No.	Pos.	Player	Date of birth (age)	Caps	Club
1	GK	Mario Garin	26 April 1992 (aged 29)	67	(Spain) Club de Campo
2		Alejandro Alonso	14 February 1999 (aged 22)	24	(Spain) Tenis
3		Enrique Zorita	14 January 1999 (aged 22)	0	
4		Ricardo Sánchez	4 December 1992 (aged 28)	106	(Spain) Club de Campo
5		Jan Lara	18 June 1996 (aged 25)	0	
6		Xavier Gispert	4 January 1999 (aged 22)	6	
7		Enrique González	26 April 1996 (aged 25)	134	(Spain) Club de Campo
8		Marc Recasens	13 September 1999 (aged 22)	21	(Spain) Club Egara
9		Álvaro Iglesias	1 March 1993 (aged 28)	162	(Spain) Club de Campo
10		José Basterra	3 January 1997 (aged 24)	20	(Spain) Club de Campo
11		Llorenç Piera	4 November 1996 (aged 24)	55	(Spain) Real Club de Polo
12		Marc Reyne	18 May 1999 (aged 22)	2	
13		Joan Tarrés	8 May 1996 (aged 25)	64	(Belgium) Royal Herakles
14		Marc Miralles	14 November 1997 (aged 23)	44	(Spain) Real Club de Polo
15		Jordi Bonastre	7 August 2000 (aged 21)	2	(Spain) Atlètic Terrassa
16	GK	Rafael Álvarez	16 February 1998 (aged 23)	2	
17		Pepe Cunill	9 July 2001 (aged 20)	9	(Spain) Atlètic Terrassa
18		Joaquín Menini	18 August 1991 (aged 30)	2	(Netherlands) Rotterdam
19		Marc Escudé	29 April 1998 (aged 23)	2	
20		Pau Cunill	4 January 2000 (aged 21)	2	(Spain) Atlètic Terrassa
21	GK	Adrian Rafi	8 January 1997 (aged 24)	0	
22		Albert Béltran	23 October 1993 (aged 27)	98	(Netherlands) Klein Zwitserland
23		Marc Vizcaino	30 April 1999 (aged 22)	1	
24		Ignacio Rodríguez	12 June 1996 (aged 25)	57	(Spain) Club de Campo
25		Eduard de Ignacio-Simó	3 March 2000 (aged 21)	0	
26		César Curiel	30 April 1999 (aged 22)	0	
27		Eduardo González-Mesones	1 February 1997 (aged 24)	0	
28		Oriol Salvador	12 January 1995 (aged 26)	1	
29		Gerard Clapés	13 September 2000 (aged 21)	0	
30		Antonio Sanz	23 May 1995 (aged 26)	1	
31		Alejandro Dávila	19 April 1991 (aged 30)	1	
32		Andreas Rafi	24 April 2002 (aged 19)	0	
33		Ricardo Santana	27 February 1993 (aged 28)	120	
34		Álvaro López-Alonso	21 August 1997 (aged 24)	0	
36		Manuel Prol	23 July 1992 (aged 29)	0	
37		Gonzalo Quijano	21 April 1999 (aged 22)	0	
42		Luis Calzado	15 November 2000 (aged 20)	0	
50		Jaume Torras	24 August 1998 (aged 23)	0	
54		Albert Pérez	18 January 1995 (aged 26)	1	
55		Salvador Armenteras	27 February 1998 (aged 23)	0	
62		Ignacio Cobos	7 November 1998 (aged 22)	0	
77		Marc Boltó	21 November 1995 (aged 25)	93	(Netherlands) HGC
83		Marc Serrahima	25 April 1995 (aged 26)	69	(Netherlands) HGC
90		Borja Lacalle	21 May 2001 (aged 20)	0	
99		Rafael Vilallonga	28 November 2001 (aged 19)	0	
