= 2023 Men's FIH Hockey World Cup squads =

The 2023 Men's FIH Hockey World Cup was an international field hockey tournament held in Bhubaneswar and Rourkela, India from 13 to 29 January 2023. The 16 national teams involved in the tournament were required to register a squad of up to 18 players.

Age, caps, goals and club as of 13 January 2023.

== Pool A ==
=== Argentina ===
Argentina announced their final squad on 21 December 2022. Lucas Vila withdrew injured after the game against South Korea and was replaced by Bautista Capurro.

Head coach: Mariano Ronconi

No.	Pos.	Player	Date of birth (age)	Caps	Club
1	GK	Tomás Santiago	15 June 1992 (aged 30)	46	(Belgium) Gantoise
4	DF	Juan Catán	5 October 1995 (aged 27)	45	(Argentina) Hurling Club
5	DF	Facundo Zárate	31 July 2000 (aged 22)	12	(Argentina) Jockey Club Córdoba
7	FW	Nicolás Keenan	6 May 1997 (aged 25)	52	(Netherlands) Klein Zwitserland
9	FW	Maico Casella	5 June 1997 (aged 25)	101	(Netherlands) HGC
10	FW	Martín Ferreiro	21 October 1997 (aged 25)	75	(Germany) Crefelder HTC
11	FW	Lucas Toscani	22 September 1999 (aged 23)	28	(Argentina) Banco Provincia
12	FW	Lucas Vila	23 August 1986 (aged 36)	270	(Argentina) Banco Provincia
14	MF	Nicolás Della Torre	1 March 1990 (aged 32)	71	(Belgium) Dragons
16	DF	Nicolás Cicileo	1 October 1993 (aged 29)	87	(Belgium) Herakles
17	DF	Santiago Tarazona	31 May 1996 (aged 26)	92	(Argentina) GEBA
18	DF	Federico Monja	12 September 1993 (aged 29)	44	(Argentina) Banco Provincia
21	FW	Tomas Domene	4 September 1997 (aged 25)	46	(Belgium) Orée
22	DF	Matías Rey (Captain)	1 December 1984 (aged 38)	253	(Argentina) San Fernando
26	MF	Agustín Mazzilli	20 June 1989 (aged 33)	241	(Belgium) Braxgata
29	MF	Thomas Habif	27 May 1996 (aged 26)	42	(Germany) Harvestehuder THC
30	MF	Agustín Bugallo	23 April 1995 (aged 27)	106	(Spain) Club de Campo
31	FW	Bautista Capurro	22 October 2003 (aged 19)	12	(Argentina) Ciudad de Buenos Aires
32	GK	Emiliano Bosso	3 December 1995 (aged 27)	11	(Germany) TSV Mannheim

Reserves:

- Agustín Machelett

=== Australia ===
Australia announced their final squad on 12 December 2022.

Head coach: Colin Batch

No.	Pos.	Player	Date of birth (age)	Caps	Goals	Club
1	MF	Lachlan Sharp	2 July 1997 (aged 25)	63	14	(Australia) NSW Pride
2	MF	Tom Craig	3 September 1995 (aged 27)	105	32	(Netherlands) Klein Zwitserland
4	DF	Jake Harvie	5 March 1998 (aged 24)	94	4	(Australia) Perth Thundersticks
5	FW	Tom Wickham	26 May 1990 (aged 32)	85	44	(Australia) Perth Thundersticks
6	DF	Matt Dawson	27 April 1994 (aged 28)	173	13	(Netherlands) Amsterdam
7	FW	Nathan Ephraums	9 June 1999 (aged 23)	32	21	(Australia) HC Melbourne
8	GK	Johan Durst	18 March 1991 (aged 31)	14	0	(Australia) HC Melbourne
10	DF	Joshua Beltz	24 April 1995 (aged 27)	76	4	(Australia) Tassie Tigers
11	MF	Eddie Ockenden (Captain)	3 April 1987 (aged 35)	402	72	(Australia) Tassie Tigers
12	MF	Jacob Whetton	15 June 1991 (aged 31)	239	71	(Australia) Brisbane Blaze
13	FW	Blake Govers	6 July 1996 (aged 26)	131	121	(Belgium) Dragons
16	DF	Tim Howard	23 June 1996 (aged 26)	97	1	(Australia) Brisbane Blaze
17	MF	Aran Zalewski (Captain)	21 March 1991 (aged 31)	222	32	(Australia) Perth Thundersticks
22	MF	Flynn Ogilvie	17 September 1993 (aged 29)	143	25	(Australia) NSW Pride
23	MF	Daniel Beale	12 February 1993 (aged 29)	213	31	(Australia) Brisbane Blaze
29	FW	Tim Brand	29 November 1998 (aged 24)	66	26	(Netherlands) Klein Zwitserland
30	GK	Andrew Charter	29 November 1998 (aged 24)	212	0	(Australia) Canberra Chill
32	DF	Jeremy Hayward	3 March 1993 (aged 29)	194	91	(Netherlands) Den Bosch

Reserves:

- Jacob Anderson
- Dylan Martin

=== France ===
France announced their final squad on 22 December 2022. Stanislas Branicki withdrew injured after the game against South Africa and was replaced by Timothée Clément.

Head coach: Fred Soyez

No.	Pos.	Player	Date of birth (age)	Caps	Club
1	GK	Arthur Thieffry	15 September 1989 (aged 33)	100	(Belgium) Orée
3	DF	Mattéo Desgouillons	21 January 2000 (aged 22)	29	(Belgium) Gantoise
4	FW	Pieter van Straaten	23 October 1992 (aged 30)	101	(Belgium) Braxgata
5	MF	Stanislas Branicki	9 April 2002 (aged 20)	24	(Belgium) Orée
6	DF	Gaspard Xavier	10 May 2002 (aged 20)	21	(Belgium) Racing Club de Bruxelles
8	MF	Simon Martin-Brisac	20 November 1992 (aged 30)	130	Racing Club de France
9	FW	Blaise Rogeau	26 November 1994 (aged 28)	97	(Belgium) Waterloo Ducks
10	DF	Viktor Lockwood	29 March 1992 (aged 30)	144	(France) Lille
11	MF	Charles Masson	13 April 1992 (aged 30)	123	(Belgium) Gantoise
14	FW	Gaspard Baumgarten	3 August 1992 (aged 30)	163	(Belgium) Léopold
16	MF	François Goyet	4 November 1994 (aged 28)	135	(Belgium) Gantoise
17	FW	Noé Jouin	2 August 2002 (aged 20)	7	(France) Saint Germain
18	DF	Jean-Baptiste Forgues	18 May 1992 (aged 30)	173	(Belgium) Léopold
20	MF	Eliot Curty	18 September 1998 (aged 24)	47	(Belgium) Orée
21	FW	Etienne Tynevez	13 February 1999 (aged 23)	98	(Belgium) Gantoise
22	DF	Victor Charlet (Captain)	19 November 1993 (aged 29)	147	(Belgium) Waterloo Ducks
28	FW	Timothée Clément	8 April 2000 (aged 22)	49	(Belgium) Gantoise
30	GK	Edgar Reynaud	17 April 1992 (aged 30)	38	(Belgium) Léopold
31	DF	Brieuc Delemazure	2 April 2002 (aged 20)	10	(France) Lille

Reserves:

- Corentin Sellier

=== South Africa ===
South Africa announced their final squad on 9 December 2022.

Head coach: Cheslyn Gie

No.	Pos.	Player	Date of birth (age)	Caps	Club
2	FW	Mustapha Cassiem	19 March 2002 (aged 20)	37	(Germany) Gladbacher HTC
5		Senzwesihle Ngubane	5 August 2001 (aged 21)	22	(South Africa) Tuks
8	MF	Nduduzo Lembethe	13 January 1996 (aged 27)	60	(Ireland) YMCA
9		Bradley Sherwood	28 May 1999 (aged 23)	25	(South Africa) Tuks
10	FW	Keenan Horne	17 June 1992 (aged 30)	101	(France) Paris Jean Bouin
11	FW	Tevin Kok	20 October 1996 (aged 26)	53	(Ireland) YMCA
14	GK	Estiaan Kriek	7 June 1995 (aged 27)	26	(Netherlands) Pinoké
21	DF	Jethro Eustice	1 November 1989 (aged 33)	166	
22	DF	Dan Bell	28 September 1994 (aged 28)	90	(Belgium) Daring
23	DF	Guy Morgan	11 April 2000 (aged 22)	6	(South Africa) Tuks
24	MF	Nic Spooner	28 August 1991 (aged 31)	53	(Germany) Harvestehuder THC
27	FW	Nqobile Ntuli	15 January 1996 (aged 26)	87	(Germany) Harvestehuder THC
29	MF	Samkelo Mvimbi	23 January 1999 (aged 23)	40	(France) Paris Jean Bouin
30	FW	Dayaan Cassiem (Captain)	1 December 1998 (aged 24)	65	(Germany) Gladbacher HTC
31	FW	Ryan Julius	19 July 1995 (aged 27)	63	(Netherlands) Almere
32	GK	Gowan Jones	24 June 1989 (aged 33)	72	
33		Jacques van Tonder	11 April 2000 (aged 22)	11	(South Africa) Maties
35		Connor Beauchamp	20 June 1997 (aged 25)	32	(South Africa) Central

Reserves:

- Tyson Dlungwana
- Luke Wynford

== Pool B ==
=== Belgium ===
Belgium announced their final squad on 5 December 2022.

Head coach: (Netherlands) Michel van den Heuvel

No.	Pos.	Player	Date of birth (age)	Caps	Club
2	GK	Loic Van Doren	14 September 1996 (aged 26)	43	(Belgium) Dragons
4	DF	Arthur Van Doren	1 October 1994 (aged 28)	217	(Netherlands) Bloemendaal
7	MF	John-John Dohmen	24 January 1988 (aged 34)	436	(Belgium) Orée
8	FW	Florent Van Aubel	25 October 1991 (aged 31)	267	(Netherlands) Pinoké
9	FW	Sébastien Dockier	28 December 1989 (aged 33)	230	(Netherlands) Pinoké
10	FW	Cédric Charlier	27 November 1987 (aged 35)	353	(Belgium) Racing Club de Bruxelles
12	DF	Gauthier Boccard	26 August 1991 (aged 31)	261	(Belgium) Léopold
13	FW	Nicolas De Kerpel	23 March 1993 (aged 29)	92	(Belgium) Herakles
16	DF	Alexander Hendrickx	6 August 1993 (aged 29)	163	(Netherlands) Pinoké
19	MF	Félix Denayer (Captain)	31 January 1990 (aged 32)	361	(Belgium) Dragons
21	GK	Vincent Vanasch	21 December 1987 (aged 35)	258	(Germany) Rot-Weiss Köln
22	MF	Simon Gougnard	17 January 1991 (aged 31)	317	(Belgium) Dragons
23	DF	Arthur De Sloover	3 May 1997 (aged 25)	124	(Netherlands) Oranje-Rood
24	MF	Antoine Kina	13 February 1996 (aged 26)	95	(Belgium) Gantoise
25	DF	Loïck Luypaert	19 August 1991 (aged 31)	271	(Belgium) Braxgata
26	MF	Victor Wegnez	25 December 1995 (aged 27)	129	(Belgium) Racing Club de Bruxelles
27	FW	Tom Boon	25 January 1990 (aged 32)	325	(Belgium) Léopold
29	DF	Maxime Van Oost	2 December 1999 (aged 23)	14	(Belgium) Waterloo Ducks
32	FW	Tanguy Cosyns	29 June 1991 (aged 31)	157	(Belgium) Racing Club de Bruxelles

Reserves:

- Thibeau Stockbroekx

=== Germany ===
Germany announced their final squad on 6 December 2022.

Head coach: André Henning

No.	Pos.	Player	Date of birth (age)	Caps	Club
1	GK	Alexander Stadler	16 October 1999 (aged 23)	32	(Netherlands) Den Bosch
2	DF	Mathias Müller	3 April 1992 (aged 30)	127	(Germany) Hamburger Polo Club
3	MF	Mats Grambusch (Captain)	4 November 1992 (aged 30)	177	(Germany) Rot-Weiss Köln
4	DF	Lukas Windfeder	11 May 1995 (aged 27)	137	(Germany) Uhlenhorst Mülheim
9	FW	Niklas Wellen	14 December 1994 (aged 28)	172	(Germany) Crefelder HTC
11	FW	Thies Prinz	7 July 1998 (aged 24)	35	(Germany) Rot-Weiss Köln
14	DF	Teo Hinrichs	17 September 1999 (aged 23)	39	(Germany) Mannheimer HC
15	DF	Tom Grambusch	4 August 1995 (aged 27)	81	(Germany) Rot-Weiss Köln
16	DF	Gonzalo Peillat	12 August 1992 (aged 30)	12	(Germany) Mannheimer HC
17	FW	Christopher Rühr	19 December 1993 (aged 29)	172	(Germany) Rot-Weiss Köln
19	FW	Justus Weigand	20 April 2000 (aged 22)	23	(Germany) Mannheimer HC
22	FW	Marco Miltkau	18 August 1990 (aged 32)	121	(Netherlands) Klein Zwitserland
23	MF	Martin Zwicker	27 February 1987 (aged 35)	277	(Germany) Berliner HC
25	MF	Hannes Müller	18 May 2000 (aged 22)	17	(Germany) UHC Hamburg
27	MF	Timur Oruz	27 October 1994 (aged 28)	100	(Germany) Rot-Weiss Köln
33	MF	Moritz Trompertz	21 September 1995 (aged 27)	53	(Germany) Rot-Weiss Köln
44	DF	Moritz Ludwig	14 September 2001 (aged 21)	14	(Germany) Uhlenhorst Mülheim
74	GK	Jean Danneberg	8 November 2002 (aged 20)	6	(Germany) Rot-Weiss Köln

Reserves:

- Niklas Bosserhoff
- Paul-Philipp Kaufmann

=== Japan ===
Japan announced their final squad on 19 December 2022.

Head coach: Akira Takahashi

No.	Pos.	Player	Date of birth (age)	Caps	Goals	Club
1	FW	Koji Yamasaki	27 February 1996 (aged 26)	122	38	(Germany) UHC Hamburg
2	DF	Shota Yamada	21 December 1994 (aged 28)	126	35	(Japan) Gifu Asahi Club
3	DF	Yusuke Kawamura	24 July 2001 (aged 21)	12	0	(Japan) Ritsumeikan University
4	DF	Yamato Kawahara	21 January 2004 (aged 18)	5	0	(Japan) Ritsumeikan University
5	MF	Seren Tanaka (Captain)	9 November 1992 (aged 30)	134	10	(Japan) Gifu Asahi Club
7	FW	Kentaro Fukuda	27 July 1995 (aged 27)	83	19	(Japan) Gifu Asahi Club
8	MF	Taiki Takade	18 November 2001 (aged 21)	10	1	(Japan) Ritsumeikan University
10	MF	Takuma Niwa	27 April 2000 (aged 22)	17	4	(Japan) Asahi University
14	DF	Raiki Fujishima	29 December 1999 (aged 23)	35	2	(Japan) ALDER Hanno
15	DF	Ken Nagayoshi	26 October 1999 (aged 23)	34	7	(Japan) Tenri University
16	FW	Hiro Saito	5 April 2002 (aged 20)	4	0	(Japan) Fukui University of Technology
18	FW	Ryosei Kato	19 August 1997 (aged 25)	30	6	(Japan) LIEBE Tochigi
19	FW	Ryoma Ooka	2 October 2001 (aged 21)	12	5	(Japan) Meiji University
20	DF	Masaki Ohashi	8 May 1993 (aged 29)	125	0	(Japan) LIEBE Tochigi
22	MF	Kaito Tanaka	1 November 1995 (aged 27)	70	6	(Japan) Nagoya Frater
24	GK	Kisho Kuroda	20 November 2003 (aged 19)	1	0	(Japan) Tenri University
29	MF	Masato Kobayashi	4 October 2002 (aged 20)	3	0	(Japan) Meiji University
30	GK	Takashi Yoshikawa	29 November 1994 (aged 28)	125	0	(Japan) Gifu Asahi Club

Reserves:

- Yuma Nagai
- Hiromasa Ochiai

=== South Korea ===
Head coach: Sin Seok-gyo

No.	Pos.	Player	Date of birth (age)	Caps	Club
1	GK	Kim Jae-hyeon	6 March 1988 (aged 34)	174	
3		Kim Hyeon-hong	21 June 1995 (aged 27)	11	
4		Kim Kyu-beom	28 May 1996 (aged 26)	6	
5		Lee Gang-san	10 September 1997 (aged 25)	5	
6		Lee Nam-yong (Captain)	28 September 1983 (aged 39)	295	
7		Jung Man-jae	18 November 1990 (aged 32)	163	
10		Hwang Tae-il	31 October 1991 (aged 31)	91	
11		Lee Jung-jun	17 May 1991 (aged 31)	117	
12		Seo In-woo	1 October 1992 (aged 30)	58	
13		Ji Woo-cheon	13 April 1994 (aged 28)	55	
15		Lee Hye-seung	22 June 1999 (aged 23)	20	
16	GK	Kim Jae-han	24 December 1998 (aged 24)	7	
18		Kim Sung-hyun	26 August 1994 (aged 28)	25	
19		Jeong Jun-woo	2 April 1993 (aged 29)	47	
21		Lee Seung-hoon	20 March 1985 (aged 37)	158	
23		Kim Hyeong-jin	14 April 1994 (aged 28)	75	
25		Jang Jong-hyun	28 March 1984 (aged 38)	309	
27		Jeon Byung-jin	11 March 1990 (aged 32)	114	
32		Lee Ju-young	24 December 1993 (aged 29)	26	
33		Yang Ji-hun	20 August 1991 (aged 31)	85	

== Pool C ==
=== Chile ===
Chile announced its final squad on 28 December 2022.

Head coach: Jorge Dabanch

No.	Pos.	Player	Date of birth (age)	Caps	Club
1	GK	Agustín Araya	2 August 1999 (aged 23)	25	(Chile) Manquehue
4	DF	Pablo Purcell	23 June 1993 (aged 29)	80	(Chile) PWCC
5	GK	Adrián Henríquez	14 July 1986 (aged 36)	130	(Chile) Manquehue
6	MF	Vicente Goñi	30 November 1995 (aged 27)	58	(Netherlands) Tilburg
8	MF	Fernando Renz (Captain)	15 February 1994 (aged 28)	82	(Chile) Manquehue
9	DF	José Maldonado	4 November 1994 (aged 28)	99	(Chile) PWCC
10	FW	Martín Rodríguez	26 March 1990 (aged 32)	170	(Chile) Sport Francés
11	MF	Kay Gesswein	28 August 1999 (aged 23)	24	(Chile) Manquehue
13	DF	Andrés Pizarro	7 December 1999 (aged 23)	45	(Chile) PWCC
14	DF	Juan Amoroso	8 July 1997 (aged 25)	68	(Belgium) Royal Uccle
15	MF	José Hurtado	18 March 1999 (aged 23)	55	(Chile) Manquehue
17	FW	Felipé Renz	29 April 1997 (aged 25)	55	(Netherlands) Victoria
18	FW	Ignacio Contardo	13 June 1994 (aged 28)	59	(Chile) PWCC
20	FW	Raimundo Valenzuela	10 May 2002 (aged 20)	16	(Netherlands) Almere
24	DF	Axel Richter	8 November 1994 (aged 28)	54	(Chile) Manquehue
26	MF	Axel Troncoso	25 February 1997 (aged 25)	55	(Chile) Manquehue
28	FW	Nils Strabucchi	28 April 1999 (aged 23)	34	(Germany) UHC Hamburg
31	FW	Franco Beccera	2 December 1997 (aged 25)	41	(Chile) Manquehue

=== Malaysia ===
Malaysia announced their final squad on 29 December 2022.

Head coach: Arul Selvaraj

No.	Pos.	Player	Date of birth (age)	Caps	Club
2	MF	Najib Hassan	20 February 1995 (aged 27)	51	(Malaysia) Tenaga Nasional Berhad
4	FW	Ramadan Rosli	1 April 1991 (aged 31)	92	
6	DF	Marhan Jalil (Captain)	5 March 1990 (aged 32)	278	(Malaysia) Terengganu
8	MF	Ashran Hamsani	20 April 1995 (aged 27)	50	(Malaysia) Maybank
10	FW	Faizal Saari	13 January 1991 (aged 32)	266	(Netherlands) Schaerweijde
12	DF	Aminudin Zain	23 May 1995 (aged 27)	11	
13	MF	Firhan Ashari	9 March 1993 (aged 29)	186	(Malaysia) Tenaga Nasional Berhad
15	FW	Shello Silverius	3 April 1999 (aged 23)	20	(Malaysia) Terengganu
17	DF	Razie Rahim	25 August 1987 (aged 35)	306	(Malaysia) Maybank
18	MF	Faiz Jali	18 February 1992 (aged 30)	191	(Malaysia) Tenaga Nasional Berhad
19	GK	Adrian Albert	19 February 1997 (aged 25)	10	(Malaysia) UiTM HA
20	MF	Azuan Hassan	16 February 1994 (aged 28)	174	(Malaysia) Maybank
21	GK	Hafizuddin Othman	7 January 1992 (aged 31)	85	(Malaysia) Terengganu
22	FW	Norsyafiq Sumantri	17 June 1996 (aged 26)	86	(Malaysia) Tenaga Nasional Berhad
25	DF	Najmi Farizal	4 April 1995 (aged 27)	102	(Malaysia) Maybank
26	FW	Shahril Saabah	28 March 1994 (aged 28)	148	(Malaysia) Tenaga Nasional Berhad
28	DF	Zulpidaus Mizun	13 June 1996 (aged 26)	26	(Malaysia) UiTM HA
29	DF	Azmirul Azahar	5 May 2000 (aged 22)	11	
28		Shahmie Irfan Suhaimi	9 May 2002 (aged 20)	4	

=== Netherlands ===
The Netherlands announced their final squad on 9 November 2022.

Head coach: Jeroen Delmee

No.	Pos.	Player	Date of birth (age)	Caps	Goals	Club
1	GK	Maurits Visser	8 June 1995 (aged 27)	17	0	(Netherlands) Bloemendaal
4	DF	Lars Balk	26 February 1996 (aged 26)	101	3	(Netherlands) Kampong
6	MF	Jonas de Geus	29 April 1998 (aged 24)	114	6	(Netherlands) Kampong
7	FW	Thijs van Dam	5 January 1997 (aged 26)	78	14	(Netherlands) Rotterdam
8	FW	Thierry Brinkman (Captain)	19 March 1995 (aged 27)	140	53	(Netherlands) Bloemendaal
9	MF	Seve van Ass	10 April 1992 (aged 30)	203	29	(Netherlands) HGC
10	MF	Jorrit Croon	9 August 1998 (aged 24)	113	10	(Netherlands) Bloemendaal
11	FW	Terrance Pieters	14 December 1996 (aged 26)	40	7	(Netherlands) Kampong
16	DF	Floris Wortelboer	4 August 1996 (aged 26)	74	3	(Netherlands) Bloemendaal
18	DF	Teun Beins	28 October 1998 (aged 24)	25	0	(Netherlands) Bloemendaal
19	FW	Tjep Hoedemakers	14 October 1999 (aged 23)	21	8	(Netherlands) Rotterdam
22	FW	Koen Bijen	27 July 1998 (aged 24)	18	8	(Netherlands) Den Bosch
24	MF	Steijn van Heijningen	28 January 1997 (aged 25)	17	2	(Netherlands) Rotterdam
26	GK	Pirmin Blaak	8 March 1988 (aged 34)	126	0	(Netherlands) Oranje-Rood
27	DF	Jip Janssen	14 October 1997 (aged 25)	73	32	(Netherlands) Kampong
29	MF	Tijmen Reijenga	10 October 1999 (aged 23)	22	3	(Netherlands) Oranje-Rood
32	DF	Justen Blok	27 September 2000 (aged 22)	28	0	(Netherlands) Rotterdam
34	DF	Derck de Vilder	23 November 1998 (aged 24)	27	3	(Netherlands) Kampong

Reserves:

- Jasper Brinkman
- Dennis Warmerdam

=== New Zealand ===
New Zealand announced their final squad on 7 December 2022.

Head coach: (South Africa) Greg Nicol

No.	Pos.	Player	Date of birth (age)	Caps	Goals	Club
1	GK	Dom Dixon	7 August 1996 (aged 26)	9	0	
4	DF	Dane Lett	29 August 1990 (aged 32)	99	2	
6	FW	Simon Child	16 April 1988 (aged 34)	288	144	
7	MF	Nick Ross	26 July 1990 (aged 32)	138	4	
8	DF	Charlie Morrison	20 July 2003 (aged 19)	0	0	
9	FW	Sam Hiha	26 August 1997 (aged 25)	18	1	
10	FW	Kim Kingston	21 May 1994 (aged 28)	26	2	
11	FW	Jake Smith	3 April 1991 (aged 31)	108	18	
12	FW	Sam Lane	30 April 1997 (aged 25)	89	30	(Netherlands) Oranje-Rood
13	DF	Simon Yorston	7 March 2000 (aged 22)	8	0	
16	MF	Aidan Sarikaya	3 July 1996 (aged 26)	62	3	(Germany) Hamburger Polo Club
17	MF	Nic Woods (Captain)	26 August 1995 (aged 27)	146	23	(Germany) Hamburger Polo Club
19	MF	Joe Morrison	4 October 2001 (aged 21)	9	0	
20	GK	Leon Hayward	23 April 1990 (aged 32)	24	0	
21	DF	Kane Russell	22 April 1992 (aged 30)	183	90	(Germany) Hamburger Polo Club
22	DF	Blair Tarrant	11 May 1990 (aged 32)	233	5	(Germany) Hamburger Polo Club
24	MF	Sean Findlay	5 December 2001 (aged 21)	25	2	(Netherlands) Oranje-Rood
26	MF	Connor Greentree	22 April 1999 (aged 23)	2	0	
31	MF	Hayden Phillips	6 February 1998 (aged 24)	104	8	

Reserves:

- David Brydon

== Pool D ==
=== England ===
England announced their final squad on 29 December 2022.

Head coach: Paul Revington

No.	Pos.	Player	Date of birth (age)	Caps	Club
2	MF	Nick Park	8 April 1999 (aged 23)	8	(England) Surbiton
3	DF	Jack Waller	28 January 1997 (aged 25)	30	(England) Wimbledon
5	DF	David Ames	25 June 1989 (aged 33)	52	(England) Holcombe
7	DF	Zachary Wallace (Captain)	29 September 1999 (aged 23)	35	(Netherlands) HGC
9	MF	Harry Martin	23 October 1992 (aged 30)	133	(Netherlands) HC Rotterdam
13	FW	Sam Ward	24 December 1990 (aged 32)	84	(England) Old Georgians
14	DF	James Albery	2 October 1995 (aged 27)	27	(England) Old Georgians
15	MF	Phil Roper	24 January 1992 (aged 30)	106	(England) Holcombe
16	GK	James Mazarelo	4 February 2001 (aged 21)	5	(England) Surbiton
17	MF	Stuart Rushmere	9 September 2000 (aged 22)	16	(England) Surbiton
19	MF	David Goodfield	15 June 1993 (aged 29)	65	(England) Surbiton
20	GK	Ollie Payne	6 April 1999 (aged 23)	23	(England) Holcombe
21	FW	Liam Ansell	12 November 1993 (aged 29)	47	(England) Wimbledon
22	MF	David Condon	6 July 1991 (aged 31)	134	(England) Wimbledon
23	FW	Nick Bandurak	14 December 1992 (aged 30)	20	(England) Holcombe
27	DF	Liam Sanford	14 March 1996 (aged 26)	53	(England) Old Georgians
29	MF	Tom Sorsby	28 October 1996 (aged 26)	29	(England) Surbiton
31	MF	Will Calnan	17 April 1996 (aged 26)	37	(England) Hampstead & Westminster

=== India ===
India announced their final squad on 23 December 2022.

Head coach: (Australia) Graham Reid

No.	Pos.	Player	Date of birth (age)	Caps	Goals	Club
4	DF	Jarmanpreet Singh	18 July 1996 (aged 26)	50	6	(India) Railway Sports Promotion Board
5	FW	Abhishek	15 August 1999 (aged 23)	28	11	(India) Punjab National Bank
6	DF	Surender Kumar	23 November 1993 (aged 29)	172	4	Food Corporation of India
7	MF	Manpreet Singh	26 June 1992 (aged 30)	314	24	(India) Punjab Armed Police
8	MF	Hardik Singh	23 September 1998 (aged 24)	84	6	(India) Indian Oil Corporation Ltd
11	FW	Mandeep Singh	25 January 1995 (aged 27)	194	96	(India) Oil and Natural Gas Corporation
12	GK	Krishan Pathak	24 April 1997 (aged 25)	80	0	(India) Indian Oil Corporation Ltd
13	DF	Harmanpreet Singh (Captain)	6 January 1996 (aged 27)	164	126	(India) Bharat Petroleum Corporation Ltd
14	FW	Lalit Upadhyay	1 December 1993 (aged 29)	133	31	India Bharat Petroleum Corporation Ltd
15	DF	Nilam Sanjeep Xess	7 November 1998 (aged 24)	34	5	Comptroller and Auditor General of India
16	GK	P. R. Sreejesh	8 May 1988 (aged 34)	274	0	(India) Physical Education & Sports, Kerala
18	MF	Nilakanta Sharma	2 May 1995 (aged 27)	91	13	(India) Railway Sports Promotion Board
21	MF	Shamsher Singh	29 July 1997 (aged 25)	47	10	(India) Punjab National Bank
22	DF	Varun Kumar	25 July 1995 (aged 27)	118	29	(India) BPCL
25	MF	Raj Kumar Pal	1 May 1998 (age 28)	25	4	Comptroller and Auditor General of India
27	MF	Akashdeep Singh	2 December 1994 (aged 28)	218	85	(India) Punjab Armed Police
30	DF	Amit Rohidas	10 May 1993 (aged 29)	131	19	(India) Railway Sports Promotion Board
32	MF	Vivek Prasad	25 February 2000 (aged 22)	90	16	(India) Bhopal Police
34	FW	Sukhjeet Singh	5 December 1996 (aged 26)	16	4	(India) Punjab National Bank

Reserves:

- Jugraj Singh

=== Spain ===
Spain announced its final squad on 23 December 2022. César Curiel withdrew injured after the game against England and was replaced by Pere Amat.

Head coach: (Argentina) Maximiliano Caldas

No.	Pos.	Player	Date of birth (age)	Caps	Club
1	GK	Mario Garín	26 April 1992 (aged 30)	88	(Spain) Tenis
2	DF	Alejandro Alonso	14 February 1999 (aged 23)	51	(Spain) Tenis
6		Xavier Gispert	4 January 1999 (aged 24)	32	(Spain) Club Egara
7	FW	Enrique González	29 April 1996 (aged 26)	162	(Spain) Club de Campo
8	DF	Marc Recasens	13 September 1999 (aged 23)	50	(Spain) Club Egara
9	MF	Álvaro Iglesias (Captain)	1 March 1993 (aged 29)	189	(Spain) Club de Campo
12		Marc Reyné	18 May 1999 (aged 23)	28	(Spain) Real Club de Polo
14	MF	Marc Miralles	14 November 1997 (aged 25)	72	(Spain) Real Club de Polo
15	MF	Jordi Bonastre	7 August 2000 (aged 22)	28	(Spain) Atlètic Terrassa
17	MF	Pepe Cunill	9 July 2001 (aged 21)	16	(Spain) Atlètic Terrassa
18	FW	Joaquín Menini	18 August 1991 (aged 31)	28	(Netherlands) Rotterdam
20	DF	Pau Cunill	4 January 2000 (aged 23)	19	(Spain) Atlètic Terrassa
21	GK	Adrian Rafi	8 January 1997 (aged 26)	25	(Spain) Barcelona
23	DF	Marc Vizcaino	30 April 1999 (aged 23)	1	(Spain) Atlètic Terrassa
24	DF	Ignacio Rodríguez	12 June 1996 (aged 26)	86	(Spain) Club de Campo
26		César Curiel	30 April 1999 (aged 23)	12	(Spain) Complutense
29		Gerard Clapés	13 September 2000 (aged 22)	26	(Spain) Club Egara
35		Pere Amat	17 September 2004 (aged 18)	2	(Spain) Club Egara
90		Borja Lacalle	21 May 2001 (aged 21)	14	(Spain) Club de Campo

Reserves:

- Rafael Villalonga

=== Wales ===
Wales announced its final squad on 29 December 2022.

Head coach: Daniel Newcombe

No.	Pos.	Player	Date of birth (age)	Caps	Club
3	DF	Daniel Kyriakides	21 March 1995 (aged 27)	107	(Germany) Club an der Alster
4	DF	Ioan Wall	28 April 1999 (aged 23)	52	(Wales) Cardiff & Met
6	DF	Jacob Draper	24 July 1998 (aged 24)	68	(England) Hampstead & Westminster
8	MF	Lewis Prosser (Captain)	13 June 1989 (aged 33)	175	(England) East Grinstead
9	MF	Rupert Shipperley (Captain)	21 November 1992 (aged 30)	93	(England) Hampstead & Westminster
10	DF	Rhodri Furlong	18 October 1995 (aged 27)	69	(England) Hampstead & Westminster
11	FW	James Carson	29 April 1994 (aged 28)	95	(England) Old Georgians
12	DF	Steve Kelly	12 May 1992 (aged 30)	73	(England) Hampstead & Westminster
15	MF	Rhys Bradshaw	19 September 2000 (aged 22)	43	(England) Wimbledon
18	DF	Gareth Furlong	10 May 1992 (aged 30)	138	(England) Surbiton
23	FW	Jack Pritchard	14 August 1993 (aged 29)	8	(Wales) Cardiff & Met
24	DF	Hywel Jones	9 July 1997 (aged 25)	48	(England) Hampstead & Westminster
25	FW	Ben Francis	20 March 1996 (aged 26)	89	(England) Wimbledon
26	FW	Luke Hawker (Captain)	29 December 1989 (aged 33)	113	(Wales) Cardiff & Met
31	MF	Gareth Griffiths	13 March 1999 (aged 23)	14	(England) Beeston
33	GK	Rhys Payne	7 June 2001 (aged 21)	2	(Wales) Cardiff & Met
35	MF	Fred Newbold	29 March 2001 (aged 21)	7	(England) Reading
50	GK	Toby Reynolds-Cotterill	6 August 1997 (aged 25)	12	(England) Hampstead & Westminster

Reserves:

- Dale Hutchinson
- Jolyon Morgan
