= 2021–22 Men's FIH Pro League =

Men's field hockey competition

- Dates: 16 October 2021 – 26 June 2022
- Teams: 9 (from 4 confederations)

Final positions
- Champions: Netherlands (1st title)
- Runner-up: Belgium
- Third place: India

Tournament statistics
- Matches played: 72
- Goals scored: 376 (5.22 per match)
- Top scorer: (India) Harmanpreet Singh (18 goals)

The 2021–22 Men's FIH Pro League was the third edition of the Men's FIH Pro League, a field hockey championship for men's national teams. The tournament started on 16 October 2021 and finished on 26 June 2022.

== Format ==
The home and away principle was kept but this principle was split over two consecutive seasons and worked according to the following example:

- in previous season 2020–21, Team A hosted Team B twice within a couple of days.
- in current season 2021–22, Team B hosted Team A twice within a couple of days.

If one of the two matches played between two teams was cancelled, the winner of the other match would have received double points.

== Teams ==
Originally, nine teams were scheduled to compete in a round-robin tournament, being played from October 2021 to June 2022. On 17 September 2021, both New Zealand and Australia withdrew due to the COVID-19 pandemic and the travel restrictions coming with it. Canada and South Africa joined on 8 December 2021. On 17 January 2022, Canada withdrew due to the COVID-19 Omicron variant and the travel restrictions coming with it, six weeks after being named New Zealand substitute. France was announced as Canada's substitute on 25 January 2022.

- ~~Australia~~
- Argentina
- Belgium
- ~~Canada~~
- England
- France
- Germany
- India
- Netherlands
- ~~New Zealand~~
- South Africa
- Spain

== Results ==
=== Standings ===
Pos	Team	Pld	W	SOW	SOL	L	GF	GA	GD	Pts
1st place, gold medalist(s)	Netherlands (C)	16	12	3	0	1	61	28	+33	42
2nd place, silver medalist(s)	Belgium	16	10	1	3	2	52	25	+27	35
3rd place, bronze medalist(s)	India	16	8	2	2	4	62	40	+22	30
4	Germany	16	8	2	0	6	40	36	+4	28
5	Argentina	16	6	3	1	6	31	35	−4	25
6	England	16	7	1	1	7	40	41	−1	24
7	Spain	16	5	0	3	8	36	43	−7	18
8	France (Note: France and South Africa were both invited after Australia and New Zealand withdrew from the competition due to COVID-19 related issues. New Zealand was initially replaced by Canada, however they withdrew after six weeks, being substituted by France.)	16	4	0	1	11	31	46	−15	13
9	South Africa	16	0	0	1	15	23	82	−59	1

Source: FIH
Rules for classification: 1) points; 2) matches won; 3) goal difference; 4) goals for; 5) head-to-head result; 6) field goals scored.
(C) Champion

=== Fixtures ===
All times are local.

16 October 2021
16:30

Belgium	6–1	Germany
Dockier 19'; Charlier 24'; Ghislain 37'; De Kerpel 50', 58'; Dohmen 59'	Report	Schachner 54'

Royal Uccle Sport, Brussels
Umpires:
Dan Barstow (ENG)
Jonas van 't Hek (NED)

17 October 2021
16:30

Belgium	5–3	Germany
Dockier 15', 19'; Cosyns 18'; T. Stockbroekx 40'; De Kerpel 58'	Report	Wellen 4'; Windfeder 27'; Hellwig 45'

Royal Uccle Sport, Brussels
Umpires:
Jonas van 't Hek (NED)
Dan Barstow (ENG)

26 November 2021
18:30

Netherlands	2–2	Belgium
Pieters 35'; Janssen 49'	Report	Van Aubel 38'; Hendrickx 53'
Penalties
T. Brinkman (penalty shoot-out scored); Van Dam (penalty shoot-out scored); De Geus (penalty shoot-out scored)	3–0	(penalty shoot-out missed) Van Aubel; (penalty shoot-out missed) De Sloover; (penalty shoot-out missed) Denayer

Wagener Stadium, Amstelveen
Umpires:
Christian Blasch (GER)
Ben Göntgen (GER)

28 November 2021
14:00

Netherlands	2–1	Belgium
Van Dam 3'; Warmerdam 6'	Report	Hendrickx 28'

Wagener Stadium, Amstelveen
Umpires:
Bruce Bale (ENG)
Christian Blasch (GER)

4 February 2022
11:00

Spain	1–6	England
Rodríguez 59'	Report	D. Scott 20'; Condon 27', 53'; Wallace 34'; Oates 35'; Goodfield 57'

Estadio Betero, Valencia
Umpires:
Bruce Bale (ENG)
Michelle Meister (GER)

5 February 2022
13:00

Spain	2–3	England
Sanz 26'; Gispert 51'	Report	Bandurak 23'; D. Scott 35'; Goodfield 60'

Estadio Betero, Valencia
Umpires:
Bruce Bale (ENG)
Ivona Makar (CRO)

8 February 2022
18:00

France	0–5	India
	Report	Harmanpreet 21'; Varun 24'; Shamsher 28'; Mandeep 32'; Akashdeep 41'

NWU Astro, Potchefstroom, South Africa
Umpires:
Wanri Venter (RSA)
Annelize Rostron (RSA)

8 February 2022
20:00

South Africa	1–11	Netherlands
Ntuli 20'	Report	Swaen 8', 47'; T. Brinkman 26', 51'; De Vilder 27'; Van Dam 30'; Croon 31'; Janssen 46', 55'; Bijen 49'; Reyenga 54'

NWU Astro, Potchefstroom
Umpires:
Sean Rapaport (RSA)
Ayden Shrives (RSA)

9 February 2022
18:00

South Africa	2–10	India
Bell 44'; Pautz 45'	Report	Harmanpreet 2'; Jugraj 4', 6', 23'; Abhishek 12'; Gursahibjit 24', 36'; Dilpreet 25', 58'; Mandeep 27'

NWU Astro, Potchefstroom
Umpires:
Annelize Rostron (RSA)
Ayden Shrives (RSA)

9 February 2022
20:00

France	2–2	Netherlands
S. Branicki 10'; Charlet 56'	Report	T. Brinkman 23'; Bijen 55'
Penalties
Lockwood (penalty shoot-out scored); Tynevez (penalty shoot-out scored); Dumont (penalty shoot-out missed); Charlet (penalty shoot-out missed)	2–4	(penalty shoot-out scored) Van Dam; (penalty shoot-out missed) T. Brinkman; (penalty shoot-out scored) Reyenga; (penalty shoot-out scored) Bijen; (penalty shoot-out scored) De Mol

NWU Astro, Potchefstroom, South Africa
Umpires:
Wanri Venter (RSA)
Sean Rapaport (RSA)

12 February 2022
18:00

France	5–2	India
Charlet 16', 59'; Lockwood 35'; Masson 48'; T. Clément 60'	Report	Jarmanpreet 22'; Harmanpreet 57'

NWU Astro, Potchefstroom, South Africa
Umpires:
Sean Rapaport (RSA)
Annelize Rotron (RSA)

12 February 2022
19:00

Argentina	2–1	Belgium
Bugallo 7'; Casella 58'	Report	Dockier 10'

CeNARD, Buenos Aires
Umpires:
Germán Montes de Oca (ARG)
Diego Barbas (ARG)

12 February 2022
20:00

South Africa	2–6	Netherlands
Jackson 26'; De Sousa 60'	Report	Van Dam 15'; T. Brinkman 21'; Warmerdam 29', 39'; Swaen 46'; Hoedemakers 54'

NWU Astro, Potchefstroom
Umpires:
Ayden Shrives (RSA)
Wanri Venter (RSA)

13 February 2022
18:00

South Africa	2–10	India
Bell 12'; Beauchamp 53'	Report	Surender 15'; Shilanand 27', 48'; Mandeep 28'; Harmanpreet 36', 52', 60', 60'; Sumit 45'; Shamsher 56'

NWU Astro, Potchefstroom
Umpires:
Annelize Rostron (RSA)
Syden Shrives (RSA)

13 February 2022
19:00

Argentina	0–2	Belgium
	Report	Hendrickx 15'; Luypaert 55'

CeNARD, Buenos Aires
Umpires:
Diego Barbas (ARG)
Germán Montes de Oca (ARG)

13 February 2022
20:00

France	1–5	Netherlands
Bellenger 33'	Report	J. Brinkman 15'; T. Brinkman 24', 32'; Croon 34'; Janssen 40'

NWU Astro, Potchefstroom, South Africa
Umpires:
Wanri Venter (RSA)
Sean Rapaport (RSA)

15 February 2022
20:00

South Africa	1–4	France
D. Cassiem 57'	Report	Baumgarten 4', 41'; Rogeau 10'; T. Clément 54'

NWU Astro, Potchefstroom
Umpires:
Ayden Shrives (RSA)
Sean Rapaport (RSA)

16 February 2022
20:00

France	2–3	Germany
T. Clément 37'; Tynevez 60'	Report	Bosserhoff 15'; T. Grambusch 51', 59'

NWU Astro, Potchefstroom, South Africa
Umpires:
Annelize Rostron (RSA)
Wanri Venter (RSA)

17 February 2022
20:00

South Africa	1–6	Germany
Horne 30'	Report	T. Grambrusch 17'; M. Grambusch 34'; Gill 41'; Prinz 45'; Herzbruch 50'; Wellen 58'

NWU Astro, Potchefstroom
Umpires:
Annelize Rostron (RSA)
Ayden Shrives (RSA)

19 February 2022
16:30

Argentina	2–0	England
Rey 5'; Monja 45+'	Report

CeNARD, Buenos Aires
Umpires:
Germán Montes de Oca (ARG)
Diego Barbas (ARG)

19 February 2022
20:00

France	2–4	Germany
T. Clément 54'; Curty 59'	Report	Weigand 33'; H. Müller 37'; Prinz 53'; Trompertz 60'

NWU Astro, Potchefstroom, South Africa
Umpires:
Sean Rapaport (RSA)
Annelize Rostron (RSA)

20 February 2022
16:30

Argentina	3–1	England
Toscani 9'; Martínez 21', 60'	Report	Bandurak 45+'

CeNARD, Buenos Aires
Umpires:
Diego Barbas (ARG)
Germán Montes de Oca (ARG)

20 February 2022
20:00

South Africa	1–2	France
M. Cassiem 8'	Report	Rogeau 18'; Charlet 37'

NWU Astro, Potchefstroom
Umpires:
Sean Rapaport (RSA)
Ayden Shrives (RSA)

21 February 2022
20:00

South Africa	1–3	Germany
Beauchamp 48'	Report	Rühr 11'; Hellwig 27'; Kaufmann 46'

NWU Astro, Potchefstroom
Umpires:
Sean Rapaport (RSA)
Wanri Venter (RSA)

26 February 2022
19:30

India	5–4	Spain
Harmanpreet 15', 60'; Shilanand 41'; Shamsher 43'; Varun 55'	Report	Pa. Cunill 14'; Miralles 20', 23', 40'

Kalinga Stadium, Bhubaneswar
Umpires:
Raghu Prasad (IND)
Javed Shaikh (IND)

27 February 2022
19:30

India	3–5	Spain
Abhishek 6'; Harmanpreet 27'; Sukhjeet 51'	Report	Pa. Cunill 14', 24'; Tarrés 14'; Pe. Cunill 54'; Miralles 59'

Kalinga Stadium, Bhubaneswar
Umpires:
Javed Shaikh (IND)
Raghu Prasad (IND)

19 March 2022
19:30

India	2–2	Argentina
Gurjant 38'; Mandeep 60'	Report	Acosta 45'; Keenan 52'
Penalties
Harmanpreet (penalty shoot-out scored); Abhishek (penalty shoot-out missed); Gurjant (penalty shoot-out missed); Sukhjeet (penalty shoot-out missed)	1–3	(penalty shoot-out scored) Keenan; (penalty shoot-out scored) Domene; (penalty shoot-out scored) Toscani; (penalty shoot-out missed) Ferreiro

Kalinga Stadium, Bhubaneswar
Umpires:
Javed Shaikh (IND)
Deepak Joshi (IND)

20 March 2022
19:30

India	4–3	Argentina
Hardik 17'; Jugraj 20', 52'; Mandeep 60'	Report	Della Torre 40'; Domene 51'; Ferreiro 56'

Kalinga Stadium, Bhubaneswar
Umpires:
Raghu Prasad (IND)
Javeed Shaikh (IND)

26 March 2022
16:30

Germany	2–1	Spain
Peillat 1'; Wellen 35'	Report	Sánchez 58'

Warsteiner HockeyPark, Mönchengladbach
Umpires:
Dan Barstow (ENG)
Michiel Otten (NED)

27 March 2022
14:30

Germany	1–1	Spain
Peillat 48'	Report	Basterra 60'
Penalties
Wellen (penalty shoot-out scored); Hartkopf (penalty shoot-out scored); Prinz (penalty shoot-out scored); Hellwig (penalty shoot-out missed)	3–2	(penalty shoot-out scored) Iglesias; (penalty shoot-out scored) Gispert; (penalty shoot-out missed) Miralles; (penalty shoot-out missed) Reyné; (penalty shoot-out missed) Vilallonga

Warsteiner HockeyPark, Mönchengladbach
Umpires:
Sarah Wilson (SCO)
Dan Barstow (ENG)

2 April 2022
19:30

India	3–3	England
Abhishek 14'; Shamsher 27'; Harmanpreet 52'	Report	Bandurak 8', 28'; Ward 60'
Penalties
Harmanpreet (penalty shoot-out missed); Shamsher (penalty shoot-out missed); Raj (penalty shoot-out scored); Abhishek (penalty shoot-out scored); Vivek (penalty shoot-out missed); Harmanpreet (penalty shoot-out missed); Abhishek (penalty shoot-out scored)	3–2	(penalty shoot-out missed) Ansell; (penalty shoot-out scored) Griffiths; (penalty shoot-out missed) Sorsby; (penalty shoot-out scored) Albery; (penalty shoot-out missed) Goodfield; (penalty shoot-out missed) Griffiths; (penalty shoot-out missed) Ansell

Kalinga Stadium, Bhubaneswar
Umpires:
Raghu Prasad (IND)
Javed Shaikh (IND)

3 April 2022
19:30

India	4–3	England
Manpreet 15+'; Harmanpreet 26', 26', 43'	Report	Sanford 7'; Condon 39'; Ward 44'

Kalinga Stadium, Bhubaneswar
Umpires:
Deepak Joshi (IND)
Raghu Prasad (IND)

14 April 2022 (Note: The matches, originally scheduled for 12 and 13 March 2022, were postponed due to positive COVID-19 tests by the German team.)
19:30

India	3–0	Germany
Harmanpreet 18', 28'; Abhishek 44'	Report

Kalinga Stadium, Bhubaneswar
Umpires:
Rawi Anbananthan (MAS)
Javed Shaikh (IND)

15 April 2022
19:30

India	3–1	Germany
Sukhjeet 19'; Varun 41'; Abhishek 54'	Report	Boeckel 45'

Kalinga Stadium, Bhubaneswar
Umpires:
Raghu Prasad (IND)
Rawi Anbananthan (MAS)

16 April 2022
18:30

Argentina	4–2	France
Martins 3', 58'; Domene 50'; Ferrero 54'	Report	Tynevez 19'; Igau 42'

CeNARD, Buenos Aires
Umpires:
Germán Montes de Oca (ARG)
Federico García (URU)

17 April 2022
18:30

Argentina	0–2	France
	Report	M. Branicki 11'; Masson 51'

CeNARD, Buenos Aires
Umpires:
Federico García (URU)
Maggie Giddens (USA)

23 April 2022
16:00

Argentina	4–3	South Africa
Monja 3'; Fernández 5'; Ferrero 48'; Sarto 43'	Report	Ntuli 14'; Guise-Brown 43', 48'

CeNARD, Buenos Aires
Umpires:
Diego Barbas (ARG)
Irene Presenqui (ARG)

24 April 2022
16:00

Argentina	2–2	South Africa
Ferrero 18'; Agostini 59'	Report	Ntuli 36'; Beauchamp 39'
Penalties
Acosta (penalty shoot-out missed); Capurro (penalty shoot-out scored); Martins (penalty shoot-out missed); Gencarelli (penalty shoot-out scored)	2–1	(penalty shoot-out missed) de Lora; (penalty shoot-out scored) Abrahams; (penalty shoot-out missed) Ntuli; (penalty shoot-out missed) Futcher; (penalty shoot-out missed) Sherwood

CeNARD, Buenos Aires
Umpires:
Germán Montes de Oca (ARG)
Irene Presenqui (ARG)

4 May 2022
17:30

Germany	0–1	England
	Report	Bandurak 12'

Warsteiner HockeyPark, Mönchengladbach
Umpires:
Jakub Mejzlík (CZE)
Martin Madden (SCO)

5 May 2022
15:30

Germany	3–2	England
Hellwig 21'; T. Grambusch 36'; Peillat 41'	Report	Condon 3'; Ward 40'

Warsteiner HockeyPark, Mönchengladbach
Umpires:
Jakub Mejzlík (CZE)
Martin Madden (SCO)

14 May 2022
16:30

Spain	0–1	Argentina
	Report	Domene 14'

Estadio Betero, Valencia
Umpires:
Steve Rogers (AUS)
Ben Göntgen (GER)

15 May 2022
16:30

Spain	1–1	Argentina
Menini 51'	Report	Casella 50'
Penalties
Gispert (penalty shoot-out scored); Menini (penalty shoot-out missed); Miralles (penalty shoot-out missed); Reyné (penalty shoot-out scored); Tarrés (penalty shoot-out scored); Gispert (penalty shoot-out scored); Reyné (penalty shoot-out scored); Menini (penalty shoot-out missed); Miralles (penalty shoot-out missed); Tarrés (penalty shoot-out missed); Gispert (penalty shoot-out missed); Reyné (penalty shoot-out missed)	5–6	(penalty shoot-out scored) Keenan; (penalty shoot-out scored) Domene; (penalty shoot-out scored) Toscani; (penalty shoot-out missed) Martínez; (penalty shoot-out missed) Ferreiro; (penalty shoot-out scored) Keenan; (penalty shoot-out scored) Domene; (penalty shoot-out missed) Toscani; (penalty shoot-out missed) Martínez; (penalty shoot-out missed) Ferreiro; (penalty shoot-out missed) Ferreiro; (penalty shoot-out scored) Keenan

Estadio Betero, Valencia
Umpires:
Ben Göntgen (GER)
Laurine Delforge (BEL)

17 May 2022
11:30

Spain	4–2	France
Alonso 5'; Davila 22'; Miralles 52'; Recasens 58'	Report	Charlet 17'; Baumgarten 28'

Estadio Betero, Valencia
Umpires:
Steve Rogers (AUS)
Ben Göntgen (GER)

18 May 2022
11:30

Spain	1–0	France
Menini 60'	Report

Estadio Betero, Valencia
Umpires:
Liu Xiaoying (CHN)
Steve Rogers (AUS)

20 May 2022
20:30

Belgium	3–3	Spain
Dohmen 39'; Boon 48', 56'	Report	Reyné 16'; Miralles 39'; Iglesias 41'
Penalties
Boccard (penalty shoot-out scored); De Sloover (penalty shoot-out scored); Gougnard (penalty shoot-out scored); Wegnez (penalty shoot-out missed); Cosyns (penalty shoot-out missed)	3–2	(penalty shoot-out scored) Gispert; (penalty shoot-out missed) Menini; (penalty shoot-out scored) Miralles; (penalty shoot-out missed) Reyné; (penalty shoot-out missed) Clapés

Wilrijkse Plein Antwerp, Antwerp
Umpires:
Christian Blasch (GER)
Dan Barstow (ENG)

21 May 2022
13:00

England	5–4	France
Goodfield 2'; Ramshaw 8', 56'; Ward 31', 59'	Report	Charlet 23'; Baumgarten 30', 44', 47'

Lee Valley Hockey and Tennis Centre, London
Umpires:
Michiel Otten (NED)
Jonas van 't Hek (NED)

21 May 2022
13:30

Germany	6–3	Argentina
T. Grambusch 14'; Hartkopf 15'; Prinz 20', 52'; Peillat 22', 42'	Report	Keenan 3'; Habif 51'; Tarazona 56'

Ernst Reuter Sportfeld, Berlin
Umpires:
Martin Madden (SCO)
Jakub Mejzlík (CZE)

21 May 2022
20:30

Belgium	5–1	Spain
Boon 7', 28', 35'; Onana 15'; Cosyns 57'	Report	Rodríguez 48'

Wilrijkse Plein Antwerp, Antwerp
Umpires:
Dan Barstow (ENG)
Christian Blasch (GER)

22 May 2022
12:00

England	4–1	France
Bandurak 19', 24'; Condon 48'; Ward 57'	Report	T. Clément 49'

Lee Valley Hockey and Tennis Centre, London
Umpires:
Jonas van 't Hek (NED)
Michiel Otten (NED)

22 May 2022
14:30

Germany	1–1	Argentina
Miltkau 43'	Report	Casella 15'
Penalties
Hartkopf (penalty shoot-out missed); T. Grambusch (penalty shoot-out scored); Trompertz (penalty shoot-out scored); Prinz (penalty shoot-out scored); Große (penalty shoot-out scored)	4–2	(penalty shoot-out missed) Keenan; (penalty shoot-out scored) Domene; (penalty shoot-out missed) Ferreiro; (penalty shoot-out scored) Cicileo

Ernst Reuter Sportfeld, Berlin
Umpires:
Martin Madden (SCO)
Jakub Mejzlík (CZE)

28 May 2022
12:00

England	4–2	South Africa
Bandurak 10', 19'; Griffiths 23'; Ward 40'	Report	Guise-Brown 49'; Horne 51'

Lee Valley Hockey and Tennis Centre, London
Umpires:
Martin Madden (SCO)
Michiel Otten (NED)

28 May 2022
18:00

Belgium	2–1	France
Cosyns 24'; Charlier 44'	Report	Charlet 60'

Wilrijkse Plein Antwerp, Antwerp
Umpires:
Christian Blasch (GER)
Sébastien Michielsen (BEL)

29 May 2022
12:00

England	3–0	South Africa
Albery 5'; Calnan 14'; Griffiths 55'	Report

Lee Valley Hockey and Tennis Centre, London
Umpires:
Martin Madden (SCO)
Michiel Otten (NED)

29 May 2022
18:00

Belgium	3–1	France
Charlier 9'; Boon 18', 23'	Report	Clément 15'

Wilrijkse Plein Antwerp, Antwerp
Umpires:
Christian Blasch (GER)
Jakub Mejzlík (CZE)

1 June 2022
17:30

Netherlands	5–2	Argentina
Van der Horst 3'; Janssen 13'; Van Battum 19'; Bijen 33'; Hoedemakers 34'	Report	Della Torre 40'; Ferreiro 42'

R.K.H.V. Union, Malden
Umpires:
Dan Barstow (ENG)
Jonas van 't Hek (NED)

2 June 2022
18:00

Netherlands	3–1	Argentina
De Geus 31'; Van Heijningen 32'; Bijen 33'	Report	Ferreiro 16'

R.K.H.V. Union, Malden
Umpires:
Christian Blasch (GER)
Dan Barstow (ENG)

4 June 2022
16:30

England	0–3	Netherlands
	Report	Warmerdam 3', 13'; Hoedemakers 56'

Lee Valley Hockey and Tennis Centre, London
Umpires:
Christian Blasch (GER)
David Tomlinson (NZL)

4 June 2022
19:00

Spain	5–3	South Africa
Miralles 13'; Clapés 24'; Basterra 36'; Lacalle 48'; Iglesias 51'	Report	Eustice 42'; Paton 47', 58'

Estadi Olímpic de Terrassa, Terrassa
Umpires:
Jonas van 't Hek (NED)
Dan Barstow (ENG)

5 June 2022
15:30

England	3–6	Netherlands
Bandurak 29'; Rushmere 38', 51'	Report	De Vilder 1', 18'; Hoedemakers 25', 45'; Wortelboer 47'; Warmerdam 60'

Lee Valley Hockey and Tennis Centre, London
Umpires:
David Tomlinson (NZL)
Christian Blasch (GER)

5 June 2022
19:00

Spain	3–0	South Africa
Basterra 13'; Recasens 21'; Ignacio-Simó 48'	Report

Estadi Olímpic de Terrassa, Terrassa
Umpires:
Jonas van 't Hek (NED)
Dan Barstow (ENG)

7 June 2022
18:00

Belgium	5–0	South Africa
De Kerpel 5'; Boon 26', 40', 48'; Hendrickx 42'	Report

Wilrijkse Plein Antwerp, Antwerp
Umpires:
David Tomlinson (NZL)
Coen van Bunge (NED)

8 June 2022
18:00

Belgium	4–2	South Africa
Onana 7'; Van Aubel 37'; Boon 40', 45'	Report	Beauchamp 2', 49'

Wilrijkse Plein Antwerp, Antwerp
Umpires:
David Tomlinson (NZL)
Coen van Bunge (NED)

11 June 2022
16:30

Belgium	3–3	India
Charlier 21'; Gougnard 36'; De Kerpel 51'	Report	Shamsher 18'; Harmanpreet 52'; Jarmanpreet 58'
Penalties
Boccard (penalty shoot-out scored); Cosyns (penalty shoot-out scored); Gougnard (penalty shoot-out scored); De Sloover (penalty shoot-out scored); De Kerpel (penalty shoot-out missed)	4–5	(penalty shoot-out scored) Harmanpreet; (penalty shoot-out scored) Abhishek; (penalty shoot-out scored) Lalit; (penalty shoot-out scored) Shamsher; (penalty shoot-out scored) Akashdeep

Wilrijkse Plein Antwerp, Antwerp
Umpires:
David Tomlinson (NZL)
Coen van Bunge (NED)

11 June 2022
16:30

Germany	2–3	Netherlands
M. Grambusch 10'; Prinz 44'	Report	Swaen 18'; De Mol 25'; Bijen 48'

Der Club an der Alster, Hamburg
Umpires:
Bruce Bale (ENG)
Jakub Mejzlík (CZE)

12 June 2022
14:30

Germany	4–1	Netherlands
Ludwig 32'; Miltkau 37'; Bosserhoff 48'; Staib 50'	Report	Bijen 4'

Der Club an der Alster, Hamburg
Umpires:
Bruce Bale (ENG)
Jakub Mejzlík (CZE)

12 June 2022
16:30

Belgium	3–2	India
De Kerpel 33'; Hendrickx 49', 59'	Report	Abhishek 25'; Mandeep 60'

Wilrijkse Plein Antwerp, Antwerp
Umpires:
Coen van Bunge (NED)
David Tomlinson (NZL)

18 June 2022
16:30

England	2–2	Belgium
Calnan 22', 31'	Report	De Sloover 31'; Hendrickx 60'
Penalties
Roper (penalty shoot-out scored); Albery (penalty shoot-out scored); Ansell (penalty shoot-out scored)	3–0	(penalty shoot-out missed) Boccard; (penalty shoot-out missed) De Sloover; (penalty shoot-out missed) Wegnez

Lee Valley Hockey and Tennis Centre, London
Umpires:
Paul Walker (ENG)
Coen van Bunge (NED)

18 June 2022
16:30

Netherlands	2–2	India
Reyenga 10'; Bijen 47'	Report	Dilpreet 22'; Harmanpreet 60+'
Penalties
Pieters (penalty shoot-out scored); Van Dam (penalty shoot-out scored); De Geus (penalty shoot-out scored); Bijen (penalty shoot-out scored)	4–1	(penalty shoot-out missed) Harmanpreet; (penalty shoot-out missed) Abhishek; (penalty shoot-out scored) Vivek

Hazelaarweg Stadion, Rotterdam
Umpires:
Jakub Mejzlík (CZE)
Bruce Bale (ENG)

19 June 2022
15:30

England	0–5	Belgium
	Report	De Kerpel 9', 59'; De Sloover 40'; Hendrickx 57', 59'

Lee Valley Hockey and Tennis Centre, London
Umpires:
Alison Keogh (IRL)
Coen van Bunge (NED)

19 June 2022
16:30

Netherlands	2–1	India
Janssen 7'; Croon 45'	Report	Abhishek 1'

Hazelaarweg Stadion, Rotterdam
Umpires:
Jakub Mejzlík (CZE)
Bruce Bale (ENG)

25 June 2022
16:30

Netherlands	4–3	Spain
T. Brinkman 4'; Galema 8'; Pieters 29'; De Geus 53'	Report	Iglesias 15'; Rodríguez 19'; Bonastre 55'

HC 's-Hertogenbosch, 's-Hertogenbosch
Umpires:
Marcin Grochal (POL)
Ben Göntgen (GER)

26 June 2022
16:00

Netherlands	4–1	Spain
Van Dam 14'; Van der Horst 19'; Wortelboer 23'; Pieters 41'	Report	Lacalle 54'

HC 's-Hertogenbosch, 's-Hertogenbosch
Umpires:
Marcin Grochal (POL)
Ben Göntgen (GER)

== Goalscorers ==
There were 376 goals scored in 73 matches, for an average of 5.15 goals per match.

18 goals

- (India) Harmanpreet Singh

12 goals

- (Belgium) Tom Boon

10 goals

- (England) Nick Bandurak

9 goals

- (Belgium) Alexander Hendrickx

8 goals

- (Belgium) Nicolas De Kerpel

7 goals

- (England) Sam Ward
- (France) Victor Charlet
- (India) Abhishek
- (Netherlands) Thierry Brinkman
- (Netherlands) Koen Bijen
- (Spain) Marc Miralles

6 goals

- (France) Gaspard Baumgarten
- (France) Timothée Clément
- (India) Mandeep Singh
- (Netherlands) Jip Janssen
- (Netherlands) Dennis Warmerdam

5 goals

- (England) David Condon
- (Germany) Tom Grambusch
- (Germany) Gonzalo Peillat
- (Germany) Thies Prinz
- (India) Jugraj Singh
- (India) Shamsher Singh
- (Netherlands) Tjep Hoedemakers
- (South Africa) Connor Beauchamp

4 goals

- (Belgium) Cédric Charlier
- (Belgium) Sébastien Dockier
- (Netherlands) Thijs van Dam
- (Netherlands) Tim Swaen

3 goals

- (Argentina) Maico Casella
- (Argentina) Tomas Domene
- (Argentina) Martín Ferreiro
- (Argentina) Lautaro Ferrero
- (Belgium) Tanguy Cosyns
- (England) Will Calnan
- (England) David Goodfield
- (Germany) Malte Hellwig
- (Germany) Niklas Wellen
- (India) Dilpreet Singh
- (India) Varun Kumar
- (India) Shilanand Lakra
- (Netherlands) Jorrit Croon
- (Netherlands) Terrance Pieters
- (Netherlands) Derck de Vilder
- (South Africa) Matthew Guise-Brown
- (South Africa) Nqobile Ntuli
- (Spain) José Basterra
- (Spain) Pau Cunill
- (Spain) Álvaro Iglesias
- (Spain) Ignacio Rodríguez

2 goals

- (Argentina) Nicolás Della Torre
- (Argentina) Nicolás Keenan
- (Argentina) Tobías Martins
- (Argentina) Lucas Martínez
- (Argentina) Federico Monja
- (Belgium) Florent Van Aubel
- (Belgium) John-John Dohmen
- (Belgium) Nelson Onana
- (Belgium) Arthur De Sloover
- (England) Chris Griffiths
- (England) Matthew Ramshaw
- (England) Stuart Rushmere
- (England) Duncan Scott
- (France) Charles Masson
- (France) Blaise Rogeau
- (France) Etienne Tynevez
- (Germany) Niklas Bosserhoff
- (Germany) Mats Grambusch
- (Germany) Marco Miltkau
- (India) Gursahibjit Singh
- (India) Jarmanpreet Singh
- (India) Sukhjeet Singh
- (Netherlands) Jonas de Geus
- (Netherlands) Jaïr van der Horst
- (Netherlands) Tijmen Reyenga
- (Netherlands) Floris Wortelboer
- (South Africa) Daniel Bell
- (South Africa) Keenan Horne
- (South Africa) Taine Paton
- (Spain) Borja Lacalle
- (Spain) Joaquín Menini
- (Spain) Marc Recasens

1 goal

- (Argentina) Nicolás Acosta
- (Argentina) Franco Agostini
- (Argentina) Agustín Bugallo
- (Argentina) Federico Fernández
- (Argentina) Thomas Habif
- (Argentina) Matías Rey
- (Argentina) Facundo Sarto
- (Argentina) Santiago Tarazona
- (Argentina) Lucas Toscani
- (Belgium) William Ghislain
- (Belgium) Simon Gougnard
- (Belgium) Loïck Luypaert
- (Belgium) Thibeau Stockbroekx
- (England) James Albery
- (England) James Oates
- (England) Liam Sanford
- (England) Zachary Wallace
- (France) Amaury Bellenger
- (France) Maximilien Branicki
- (France) Stanislas Branicki
- (France) Eliot Curty
- (France) Antonin Igau
- (France) Viktor Lockwood
- (Germany) Anton Boeckel
- (Germany) Luis Gill
- (Germany) Raphael Hartkopf
- (Germany) Timm Herzbruch
- (Germany) Paul-Philipp Kaufmann
- (Germany) Moritz Ludwig
- (Germany) Hannes Müller
- (Germany) Christopher Rühr
- (Germany) Mario Schachner
- (Germany) Constantin Staib
- (Germany) Moritz Trompertz
- (Germany) Justus Weigand
- (Germany) Lukas Windfeder
- (India) Surender Kumar
- (India) Akashdeep Singh
- (India) Gurjant Singh
- (India) Hardik Singh
- (India) Manpreet Singh
- (India) Sumit
- (Netherlands) Bram van Battum
- (Netherlands) Jasper Brinkman
- (Netherlands) Jelle Galema
- (Netherlands) Steijn van Heijningen
- (Netherlands) Joep de Mol
- (South Africa) Dayaan Cassiem
- (South Africa) Mustaphaa Cassiem
- (South Africa) Jethro Eustice
- (South Africa) Le-Neal Jackson
- (South Africa) Richard Pautz
- (South Africa) Matthew de Sousa
- (Spain) Alejandro Alonso
- (Spain) Jordi Bonastre
- (Spain) Gerard Clapés
- (Spain) Pepe Cunill
- (Spain) Alejandro Davila
- (Spain) Xavier Gispert
- (Spain) Eduard de Ignacio-Simó
- (Spain) Marc Reyné
- (Spain) Antonio Sanz
- (Spain) Ricardo Sánchez
- (Spain) Joan Tarrés

Source: FIH

== See also ==
- 2021–22 Women's FIH Pro League
