= 2021–22 Men's Hoofdklasse Hockey =

Field hockey league season

Hoofdklasse
- Season: 2021–22
- Dates: 12 September 2021 – 29 May 2022
- Champions: Bloemendaal (22nd title)
- Relegated: Hurley; SCHC; Tilburg
- Euro Hockey League: Amsterdam; Bloemendaal; Pinoké
- Matches: 132
- Goals: 641 (4.86 per match)
- Top goalscorer: Alexander Hendrickx (25 goals)
- Biggest home win: Kampong 8–0 Hurley; Rotterdam 9–1 Tilburg
- Biggest away win: Hurley 0–8 Pinoké; SCHC 0–8 Rotterdam
- Highest scoring: Kampong 9–2 SCHC

The 2021–22 Men's Hoofdklasse Hockey, also known as the Tulp Hoofdklasse Men for sponsorship reasons, was the 49th season of the Men's Hoofdklasse Hockey, the top Dutch field hockey league. It began on 12 September 2021 and it concluded on 28 May 2022 with the second match of the championship final.

Bloemendaal were the defending champions. They defended their title by defeating Pinoké 3–0 in the final best of three series.

== Teams ==
2021–22 Men's Hoofdklasse teams

=== Accommodation and locations ===
Team	Location	Province	Accommodation
Amsterdam	Amstelveen	North Holland	Wagener Stadium
Bloemendaal	Bloemendaal	North Holland	Sportpark 't Kopje
Den Bosch	's-Hertogenbosch	North Brabant	Sportpark Oosterplas
HGC	Wassenaar	South Holland	De Roggewoning
Hurley	Amstelveen	North Holland	Amsterdamse Bos
Kampong	Utrecht	Utrecht	De Klapperboom
Klein Zwitserland	The Hague	South Holland	Sportpark Klein Zwitserland
Oranje-Rood	Eindhoven	North Brabant	Sportpark Aalsterweg
Pinoké	Amstelveen	North Holland	Amsterdamse Bos
Rotterdam	Rotterdam	South Holland	Hazelaarweg Stadion
SCHC	Bilthoven	Utrecht	Sportpark Kees Broekelaan
Tilburg	Tilburg	North Brabant	Sportpark Oude Warande

=== Personnel ===
Team	Trainer-coach	Captain
Amsterdam	(Netherlands) Alexander Cox	(Netherlands) Mirco Pruyser
Bloemendaal	(Netherlands) Rick Mathijssen	(Netherlands) Glenn Schuurman
Den Bosch	(Netherlands) Jeroen Verboom	(Netherlands) Imre Vos
HGC	(Netherlands) Paul van Ass	(Netherlands) Seve van Ass
Hurley	(Netherlands) Reinoud Wolff	(Netherlands) Pim Wasser
Kampong	(Netherlands) Roelant Oltmans	(Netherlands) Lars Balk
Klein Zwitserland	(Netherlands) Omar Schlingemann	(Netherlands) Steven van Rhede van der Kloot
Oranje-Rood	(Netherlands) Robert van der Horst	(Belgium) Thomas Briels
Pinoké	(Netherlands) Jesse Mahieu	(Netherlands) Jannis van Hattum
Rotterdam	(Netherlands) Albert Kees Maneschijn	(Netherlands) Jeroen Hertzberger
SCHC	(Netherlands) Gilles van Hesteren	(Netherlands) Léon van Barneveld
Tilburg	(Netherlands) Sjoerd Marijne	(Netherlands) Felix Gulinck

=== Number of teams by province ===
Province	Number of teams	Teams
North Holland	4	Amsterdam, Bloemendaal, Hurley and Pinoké
North Brabant	3	Den Bosch, Oranje-Rood and Tilburg
South Holland	3	HGC, Klein Zwitserland and Rotterdam
Utrecht	2	Kampong and SCHC
Total	12	

== Regular season ==
=== Standings ===
Pos	Team	Pld	W	D	L	GF	GA	GD	Pts	Qualification or relegation
1	Bloemendaal (C)	22	18	3	1	71	29	+42	57	Qualification for the Euro Hockey League and the play-offs
2	Pinoké	22	13	4	5	71	43	+28	43	Qualification for the Euro Hockey League and the play-offs
3	Amsterdam	22	13	3	6	60	48	+12	42	Qualification for the Euro Hockey League and the play-offs
4	HGC	22	12	5	5	58	43	+15	41	Qualification for the play-offs
5	Kampong	22	12	4	6	69	30	+39	40	
6	Oranje-Rood	22	11	5	6	53	39	+14	38	
7	Klein Zwitserland	22	9	4	9	52	48	+4	31	
8	Den Bosch	22	8	6	8	54	58	−4	30	
9	Rotterdam	22	6	6	10	53	54	−1	24	
10	Tilburg (R)	22	3	2	17	31	81	−50	11	Qualification for the relegation play-offs
11	SCHC (R)	22	2	5	15	38	84	−46	11	Qualification for the relegation play-offs
12	Hurley (R)	22	0	3	19	31	84	−53	3	Relegation to the Promotieklasse

Source: Flashscore
Rules for classification: 1) points; 2) matches won; 3) goal difference; 4) goals for; 5) head-to-head result.
(C) Champions; (R) Relegated

=== Results ===
Home \ Away	AMS	BLO	DB	HGC	HUR	KAM	KZ	OR	PIN	ROT	SCH	TIL
Amsterdam	—	3–6	2–3	2–4	3–1	1–0	2–2	3–2	4–4	2–0	2–1	3–0
Bloemendaal	4–2	—	4–0	2–1	2–1	2–1	2–1	2–1	1–2	3–0	6–0	6–0
Den Bosch	0–0	3–3	—	1–3	5–2	0–2	2–4	1–1	2–7	2–2	6–1	4–2
HGC	1–3	2–2	3–2	—	3–2	4–3	2–1	1–2	1–2	3–3	1–0	4–1
Hurley	1–4	1–6	2–3	2–7	—	1–2	1–4	0–2	0–8	2–2	3–3	2–2
Kampong	8–1	0–2	1–2	2–0	8–0	—	2–2	1–1	2–1	1–0	9–2	7–1
Klein Zwitserland	0–1	1–3	4–3	2–3	3–1	2–1	—	3–5	3–1	1–2	5–2	4–3
Oranje-Rood	2–4	1–2	3–1	3–3	3–2	3–3	4–2	—	1–2	4–1	4–1	2–1
Pinoké	3–6	1–2	3–3	4–4	3–2	1–2	3–3	2–1	—	3–0	5–1	4–2
Rotterdam	0–5	4–4	3–4	1–3	4–2	2–2	0–0	3–4	0–7	—	4–1	9–1
SCHC	3–3	2–3	4–4	2–2	3–2	2–5	3–2	1–1	3–4	0–8	—	2–3
Tilburg	2–4	2–4	2–3	1–3	4–1	0–7	2–2	0–3	0–1	0–5	2–1	—

Source: Flashscore
Legend: Blue = home team win; Yellow = draw; Red = away team win.

=== Top goalscorers ===
Rank	Player	Club	FG	PC	PS	Goals
1	(Belgium) Alexander Hendrickx	Pinoké	0	23	2	25
2	(Netherlands) Jip Janssen	Kampong	1	20	1	22
3	(Netherlands) Thierry Brinkman	Bloemendaal	20	0	0	20
4	(Netherlands) Jeroen Hertzberger	Rotterdam	5	10	3	18
5	(Australia) Trent Mitton	Amsterdam	11	5	0	16
5	(Netherlands) Seve van Ass	HGC	1	11	4	16
7	(Netherlands) Koen Bijen	Den Bosch	12	1	2	15
7	(Netherlands) Gijs van Merriënboer	Oranje-Rood	0	14	1	15
9	(Netherlands) Dennis Warmerdam	Pinoké	14	0	0	14
9	(Argentina) Leandro Tolini	Tilburg	0	14	0	14

== Play-offs ==
The semi-finals were held on 15, 21 and 22 May 2022 and the final was held on 26 and 28 May 2022.

=== Bracket ===
Semi-finals
Bloemendaal	3	1	2
HGC	0	3	1
Pinoké	2 (4)	3
Amsterdam	2 (3)	0

Final
Bloemendaal	3 (3)	3
Pinoké	3 (0)	0

=== Semi-finals ===
15 May 2022
18:00

HGC	0–3	Bloemendaal
	Report	Fuchs 27'; Van der Veen 50'; J. Brinkman 50'

De Roggewoning, Wassenaar

21 May 2022
16:00

Bloemendaal	1–3	HGC
Croon 14'	Report	Vos 53'; Boltó 55'; Van der Kroon 68'

Sportpark 't Kopje, Bloemendaal

22 May 2022
15:00

Bloemendaal	2–1	HGC
Swaen 42'; Bovendeert 45'	Report	Forsyth 39'

Sportpark 't Kopje, Bloemendaal

Bloemendaal won series 2–1.

15 May 2022
16:00

Amsterdam	2–2	Pinoké
Mitton 8'; Dommershuijzen 31'	Report	Van Hattum 20'; Warmerdam 69'
Penalties
Lissone (penalty shoot-out scored); Pruyser (penalty shoot-out scored); Middendorp (penalty shoot-out scored); Verga (penalty shoot-out missed); Mitton (penalty shoot-out missed)	3–4	(penalty shoot-out scored) Wellen; (penalty shoot-out scored) Landbrug; (penalty shoot-out scored) Bonhof; (penalty shoot-out missed) Warmerdam; (penalty shoot-out scored) M. Bukkens

Wagener Stadium, Amstelveen

21 May 2022
16:00

Pinoké	3–0	Amsterdam
M. Bukkens 15'; Dockier 29', 37'	Report

Amsterdamse Bos, Amstelveen

Pinoké won series 2–0.

=== Final ===
26 May 2022
14:45

Pinoké	3–3	Bloemendaal
Hendrickx 18', 44'; Wellen 30'	Report	T. Brinkman 3'; Swaen 32'; Van Doren 70'
Penalties
Wellen (penalty shoot-out missed); Landbrug (penalty shoot-out missed); Bonhof (penalty shoot-out missed)	0–3	(penalty shoot-out scored) Croon; (penalty shoot-out scored) T. Brinkman; (penalty shoot-out scored) Fuchs

Amsterdamse Bos, Amstelveen
Attendance: 2,750

28 May 2022
15:45

Bloemendaal	3–0	Pinoké
Bovendeert 13', 21'; Swaen 68'	Report

Sportpark 't Kopje, Bloemendaal
Attendance: 4,000

Bloemendaal won series 2–0.

== Relegation play-offs ==
The relegation play-offs were held on 1, 4 and 6 June 2022.

=== Overview ===
Team 1	Series	Team 2	Game 1	Game 2	Game 3
Voordaan	2–1	Tilburg	2–2 (3–2 s.o.)	1–4	4–4 (4–2 s.o.)
HDM	2–1	SCHC	3–3 (1–2 s.o.)	2–1	4–2

=== Matches ===
1 June 2022
20:30

Voordaan	2–2	Tilburg
Stolk 18', 70'	Report	Casella 4'; Tolini 42'
Penalties
Huisman (penalty shoot-out scored); Vermeij (penalty shoot-out scored); Frohn (penalty shoot-out scored); Stolk (penalty shoot-out missed)	3–2	(penalty shoot-out scored) Sprengers; (penalty shoot-out missed) Kreft; (penalty shoot-out scored) Casella; (penalty shoot-out missed) Verzuu; (penalty shoot-out missed) Prol

Sportpark Bos, Groenekan

4 June 2022
16:00

Tilburg	4–1	Voordaan
Krens 31'; Tolini 41'; Gencarelli 53'; Kreft 65'	Report	Stolk 70'

Sportpark Oude Warande, Tilburg

6 June 2022
16:00

Voordaan	4–4	Tilburg
Huisman 18', 21', 45'; Stolk 59'	Report	Casella 22', 32'; Tolini 53'; Krens 64'
Penalties
Huisman (penalty shoot-out scored); Vermeij (penalty shoot-out scored); Frohn (penalty shoot-out scored); Van der Weerd (penalty shoot-out scored)	4–2	(penalty shoot-out scored) Sprengers; (penalty shoot-out missed) Casella; (penalty shoot-out scored) Kreft; (penalty shoot-out missed) Bams

Sportpark Bos, Groenekan

Voordaan won series 2–1 and were promoted to the Hoofdklasse while Tilburg were relegated to the Promotieklasse.

1 June 2022
20:30

HDM	3–3	SCHC
Osses; Van den IJssel; De Gier	Report	Sweering; Terwel; Weers
Penalties
Groenheijde (penalty shoot-out missed); De Gier (penalty shoot-out missed); Taberima (penalty shoot-out scored); Schut (penalty shoot-out missed); Burkhardt (penalty shoot-out missed)	1–2	(penalty shoot-out scored) Uildriks; (penalty shoot-out missed) Sweering; (penalty shoot-out missed) Weers; (penalty shoot-out missed) Van Leur; (penalty shoot-out scored) Kleinsman

Sportpark Duinzigt, The Hague

4 June 2022
16:00

SCHC	1–2	HDM
Weers 40'	Report	Burkhardt 1', 70'

Sportpark Kees Broekelaan, Bilthoven

6 June 2022
16:00

HDM	4–2	SCHC
Burkhardt 18'; Groenheijde 57'; Kallenberg 58'; Fontaine 67'	Report	Empey 28'; Sweering 63'

Sportpark Duinzigt, The Hague

HDM won series 2–1 and were promoted to the Hoofdklasse while SCHC were relegated to the Promotieklasse.
