= François Goyet =

French field hockey player

Personal information
- Born: 4 November 1994 (age 31)
- Height: 183 cm (6 ft 0 in)
- Weight: 69 kg (152 lb)

Sport
- Sport: Field hockey
- Position: Midfielder
- Club: Saint Germain
Youth career
- Team
- –: Saint Germain
Senior career
Years	Team	Caps	Goals
–2019	Saint Germain	-	-
2019–2024	Gantoise	-	-
2024–present	Saint Germain	-	-
National team
Years	Team	Caps	Goals
2014	France U21	5	(0)
2014–present	France	157	(23)

François Goyet (born 4 November 1994) is a French field hockey player who plays as a midfielder for Saint Germain and the French national team.

== Club career ==
In club competition, Goyet plays for Gantoise in the Belgian Hockey League until 2024. He joined Gantoise in 2019 after having played for Saint Germain in France. He returned to Saint Germain after the 2024 Summer Olympics for the 2024–25 season.

== International career ==
=== Under–21 ===
François Goyet debuted for the French under-21 team in 2014 at the EuroHockey Junior Championship in Waterloo.

=== Senior national team ===
Following his junior debut, Goyet made his first appearance for Les Bleus in 2014 during a test series against Ireland in Wattignies. In 2018, He was a member of the national team at the FIH World Cup in Bhubaneswar.

Goyet won his first major medal with the senior team in 2019 at the FIH Series Finals in Le Touquet, taking home a gold medal. He was named in the French squad for season three of the FIH Pro League.
