= Blaise Rogeau =

French field hockey player

Personal information
- Full name: Blaise Antoine Rogeau
- Born: 26 November 1994 (age 31) France
- Height: 179 cm (5 ft 10 in)
- Weight: 74 kg (163 lb)

Sport
- Sport: Field hockey
- Position: Forward
- Club: Saint Germain
Senior career
Years	Team	Caps	Goals
–2019	Saint Germain	-	-
2019–2022	Gantoise	-	-
2022–2024	Waterloo Ducks	-	-
2024–present	Saint Germain	-	-
National team
Years	Team	Caps	Goals
2014	France U–21	5	(0)
2016–present	France	113	(41)
- Updated on 22 April 2025

Blaise Antonie Rogeau (born 26 November 1994) is a French field hockey player who plays as a forward for Saint Germain and the French national team.

== Club career ==
Rogeau was crowned French champions four times with Saint Germain. He left France in 2019 to play for Gantoise in Belgium. After reaching the final of the Belgian championship with Gantoise in 2022 he joined the Waterloo Ducks. He returned to Saint Germain after the 2024 Summer Olympics for the 2024–25 season.

== International career ==
=== Under–21 ===
Blaise Rogeau debuted for the France U–21 team in 2014, at the EuroHockey Junior Championship in Waterloo. In all, he represented France U-21 in five games.

=== Les Bleus ===
Rogeau made his debut for Les Bleus in 2016 during a test series against Wales in Cardiff. Since his debut, He has been a regular fixture in the national squad. In 2018 he represented the team at the FIH World Cup in Bhubaneswar. He won his first major medal with the senior team in 2019 at the FIH Series Finals in Le Touquet, taking home a gold medal. In 2022 he was a member of the French squad in season three of the FIH Pro League.
