= Tim Swaen =

Dutch field hockey player

Personal information
- Born: 28 August 1991 (age 34) Deurne, Netherlands

Sport
- Sport: Field hockey
- Position: Defender
Youth career
- Team
- –: Deurne
- –: Helmond
- –: Oranje Zwart
Senior career
Years	Team	Caps	Goals
2009–2014	Eindhoven	-	-
2014–2017	Tilburg	-	-
2017–2023	Bloemendaal	-	-
National team
Years	Team	Caps	Goals
2021–2022	Netherlands	11	(4)

Tim Swaen (born 28 August 1991) is a Dutch former field hockey player who played as a defender.

== Club career ==
Swaen played in the youth ranks of Deurne, Helmond and Oranje Zwart, where he was deemed not good enough for the first team so he moved to HC Eindhoven. After having played for five years at HC Eindhoven and three years at Tilburg, the defender was picked up in 2017 by Bloemendaal. In the 2021–22 season he won his third league title in a row with Bloemendaal. After the 2022–23 season, where he won his fourth Euro Hockey League title, he announced his retirement as a field hockey player.

== International career ==
Tim Swaen was named in the Oranje squad for the first time in 2021. Later that year he went on to make his international debut during season three of the FIH Pro League. After he was not selected for the 2023 World Cup squad he announced his retirement from the national team after the tournament.

== Honours ==
Bloemendaal

- Euro Hockey League: 2017–18, 2021, 2022, 2022–23
- Hoofdklasse: 2018–19, 2020–21, 2021–22

Netherlands

- FIH Pro League: 2021–22
