= Nicolas Dumont (field hockey) =

French field hockey player (born 1991)

Personal information
- Full name: Nicolas Robert Raymond Dumont
- Born: 13 December 1991 (age 34)
- Height: 191 cm (6 ft 3 in)
- Weight: 72 kg (159 lb)

Sport
- Sport: Field hockey
- Position: Midfield
- Club: Waterloo Ducks
National team
Years	Team	Caps	Goals
2013–2014	Belgium	12	(0)
2017–	France	79	(3)
Medal record
Men's field hockey
Representing France
FIH Hockey Series
Gold medal – first place	2018–19 Le Touquet	Team

Nicolas Robert Raymond Dumont (born 13 December 1991) is a Belgian–French field hockey player.

== Career ==
=== Club level ===
In club competition, Dumont plays for the Waterloo Ducks in the Belgian Hockey League.

=== Belgium ===
Nicolas Dumont made his debut for Belgium in 2013. The following year he competed at the 2012–13 Men's FIH World League in New Delhi.

=== France ===
After a three-year hiatus from international competition, Dumont made his debut for Les Bleus. His first appearance for France came in a test series against Wales in Paris.

The year following his debut, Dumont became a regular inclusion in the national squad. He appeared in a number of test–series' and competitions, culminating with an appearance at the 2018 FIH World Cup in Bhubaneswar, where the team finished eighth.

He has since gone on to win a gold medal in the 2018–19 FIH Hockey Series in Le Touquet. He was most recently names in the national squad for season three of the FIH Pro League.
