= Marc Reyné =

Spanish field hockey player

Personal information
- Full name: Marc Reyné de Trincheria
- Born: 18 May 1999 (age 27) Barcelona, Spain

Sport
- Sport: Field hockey
- Position: Forward
- Club: Braxgata
Senior career
Years	Team	Caps	Goals
–2024	Real Club de Polo	-	-
2024–present	Braxgata	-	-
National team
Years	Team	Caps	Goals
2019	Spain U21	9	(1)
2019–present	Spain	73	(26)
Medal record
World Cup
Silver medal – second place	2026 Wavre/Amstelveen
EuroHockey Championships
Bronze medal – third place	2025 Mönchengladbach
- Updated on 14 January 2025

Marc Reyné de Trincheria (born 18 May 1999) is a Spanish field hockey player who plays as a forward for Belgian Hockey League club Braxgata and the Spain national team.

== Club career ==
Reyné played for Real Club de Polo in Spain before joining Braxgata in Belgium in 2024.

== International career ==
He was an important member of the Spanish side which competed at the 2019 Men's EuroHockey Junior Championship where Spain finished at fourth place.

He was part of the Spanish national side which competed at the 2021–22 Men's FIH Pro League where Spain finished at seventh position. He is a member of the Spanish squad which is currently competing at the 2022–23 Men's FIH Pro League.

He was named in Spain's squad for the 2023 Men's EuroHockey Championship Qualifiers. He was also named in Spanish squad for the 2023 Men's FIH Hockey World Cup and it also marked his maiden FIH Hockey World Cup appearance.
