= Marc Miralles =

Spanish field hockey player (born 1997)

Personal information
- Full name: Marc Miralles Portillo
- Born: 14 November 1997 (age 28)

Sport
- Sport: Field hockey
- Position: Midfielder
- Club: Real Club de Polo
Youth career
- Team
- –: CD Terrassa
Senior career
Years	Team	Caps	Goals
–2020	CD Terrassa	-	-
2020–2023	Real Club de Polo	-	-
2023–2025	Bloemendaal	-	-
2025–present	Real Club de Polo	-	-
National team
Years	Team	Caps	Goals
2017	Spain U21	4	(2)
2018–present	Spain	123	(44)
Medal record
World Cup
Silver medal – second place	2026 Wavre/Amstelveen
EuroHockey Championships
Bronze medal – third place	2025 Mönchengladbach
- Updated on 18 May 2025

Marc Miralles Portillo (born 14 November 1997) is a Spanish field hockey player who plays as a midfielder for División de Honor club Real Club de Polo and the Spain national team.

== Club career ==
In the Spanish División de Honor, Miralles played for CD Terrassa until 2020. In June 2020 it was announced he would move to Real Club de Polo in Barcelona. After three years at Polo he left Spain to play for Bloemendaal in the Netherlands, where he signed a two-year contract. After his contract expired he returned to Real Club de Polo.

== International career ==
=== Under–21 ===
In 2017, Miralles was a member of the Spanish under-21 team at the EuroHockey Junior Championship in Valencia. Spain finished in equal third place at the tournament, after sickness among the Spanish team forced the cancellation of the bronze medal match.

=== Senior national team ===
Miralles made his debut for Los Redsticks in 2018, during a test series against Wales in Terrassa. In 2021, Miralles made his first appearance at a major tournament, representing the team at the EuroHockey Championships in Amsterdam. Miralles was named as a co-captain of the team in 2022, when the squad for season three of the FIH Pro League was announced. He made his World Cup debut at the 2023 Men's FIH Hockey World Cup.
