= Pau Cunill =

Spanish field hockey player (born 2000)

Personal information
- Full name: Pau Cunill Clapés
- Born: 4 January 2000 (age 26)

Sport
- Sport: Field hockey
- Position: Defender
- Club: Atlètic Terrassa
National team
Years	Team	Caps	Goals
2021	Spain U21	6	(8)
2022–present	Spain	24	(10)
- Updated on 2 February 2023

Pau Cunill Clapés (born 4 January 2000) is a Spanish field hockey player who plays as a defender for División de Honor club Atlètic Terrassa and the Spain national team.

== Personal life ==
Pau Cunill has a younger brother, Pepe, who also plays field hockey for Spain.

== Club career ==
In the Spanish División de Honor, Cunill plays for Atlètic Terrassa.

== International career ==
=== Under–21 ===
Cunill made his debut for the Spain under-21 team in 2021, at the FIH Junior World Cup in Bhubaneswar.

=== Los Redsticks ===
In 2022 Cunill made his debut for Los Redsticks in a test match against the Netherlands in Cádiz. He was later named in the national squad for season three of the FIH Pro League. In September 2022 he was nominated for the FIH Rising Star of the Year Award at the 2021–22 FIH Hockey Stars Awards. He made his World Cup debut at the 2023 Men's FIH Hockey World Cup.

== Honours ==
Atlètic Terrassa

- División de Honor: 2021–22
- Copa del Rey: 2021–22
