= Terrance Pieters =

Dutch field hockey player

Personal information
- Born: 14 December 1996 (age 29)

Sport
- Sport: Field hockey
- Club: Kampong
National team
Years	Team	Caps	Goals
–	Netherlands		-
Medal record
World Cup
Bronze medal – third place	2023 Bhubaneswar/Rourkela
EuroHockey Championship
Gold medal – first place	2023 Mönchengladbach
Silver medal – second place	2025 Mönchengladbach

Terrance Pieters (born 14 December 1996) is a Dutch professional field hockey player who plays as a forward for the Netherlands at international level and also plays as a forward for Kampong. He is the first person of colour to play for the Netherlands men's national field hockey team.

== Biography ==
He was born to a Surinamese mother and to Dutch father of Indonesian origin. His elder sister Melissa Pieters is also a field hockey player. Both he and his elder sister grew and raised up in Almere which is a multicultural city. During his childhood days, just like fellow young boys of colour, he also dreamed of pursuing his interest in the sport of football with even aiming to play for world renowned clubs like Manchester United and Barcelona. He even idolised former Ivorian veteran footballer Didier Drogba and had since worn the No 11 jersey as a sign of respect to him. However, he decided to give up his ambition of becoming a footballer after realising the fact that it would be easier for his parents to send both him and his sister to the same hockey club. He pursued field hockey at the age of six and he changed his mindset from football to hockey mainly due to the influence of his sister. His cousin Marlon Landburg is also a field hockey player.

He openly spoke out against the racism for the first time in 2020 sharing his own experiences in wake of aftermath the brutal murder of African-American man George Floyd. He revealed the bitter experience of having confronted racism and discrimination as a person of colour in a Dutch national paper de Volkskrant, where he points out that derogatory remarks such as monkey and Zwarte Piet were often directed at him especially at primary school where he studied.

== International career ==
He was part of the Dutch team which competed at the 2016 Men's Hockey Junior World Cup. He was a vital member of the Dutch side which emerged triumphant at the 2017 Men's EuroHockey Junior Championship. He made his senior international debut with the Dutch team in 2017.

He was part of the Dutch side which claimed third place at the 2019 Men's FIH Pro League which was also the inaugural edition of the Men's FIH Pro League. He was also named in Netherlands squad for the 2020–21 Men's FIH Pro League and Dutch finished at fifth position during the tournament. He was ruled out of the national team for weeks due to a hamstring injury and he was subsequently omitted from selection trials by the previous national head coach Maximiliano Caldas for the 2020 Summer Olympics.

He was part of the Dutch national side which competed at the 2021–22 Men's FIH Pro League where Spain finished at seventh position. He is a member of the Dutch squad which is currently competing at the 2022–23 Men's FIH Pro League. He was also named in Dutch squad for the 2023 Men's FIH Hockey World Cup and it also marked his maiden FIH Hockey World Cup appearance.
