= Moritz Trompertz =

German field hockey player

Personal information
- Full name: Moritz Sebastian Trompertz
- Born: 21 September 1995 (age 30) Cologne, Germany
- Height: 1.80 m (5 ft 11 in)
- Weight: 76 kg (168 lb)

Sport
- Sport: Field hockey
- Position: Midfielder
- Club: Rot-Weiss Köln
Youth career
- Team
- –: Rot-Weiss Köln
- –: Uhlenhorst Mülheim
Senior career
Years	Team	Caps	Goals
2011–2012	Uhlenhorst Mülheim	-	-
2012–present	Rot-Weiss Köln	-	-
National team
Years	Team	Caps	Goals
2015–present	Germany	42	(3)
Medal record
Men's field hockey
Representing Germany
Olympic Games
Bronze medal – third place	2016 Rio de Janeiro	Team
World Cup
Gold medal – first place	2023 Bhubaneswar/Rourkela
Junior World Cup
Gold medal – first place	2013 New Delhi
EuroHockey Junior Championship
Silver medal – second place	2014 Waterloo

Moritz Sebastian Trompertz (born 21 September 1995) is a German field hockey player who plays as a midfielder for Rot-Weiss Köln.

He represented his country at the 2016 Summer Olympics, where he won the bronze medal.
