= Pepe Cunill =

Spanish field hockey player (born 2001)

Personal information
- Full name: Pepe Cunill Clapés
- Born: 9 July 2001 (age 25)

Sport
- Sport: Field hockey
- Position: Midfielder
- Club: Koninklijke Hockey Club Dragons
National team
Years	Team	Caps	Goals
2020–present	Spain	21	(1)
2021–2022	Spain U21	11	(7)
Medal record
World Cup
Silver medal – second place	2026 Wavre/Amstelveen
EuroHockey Championships
Bronze medal – third place	2025 Mönchengladbach
- Updated on 1 February 2023

Pepe Cunill Clapés (Note: In this Spanish name, the first or paternal surname is Cunill and the second or maternal family name is Clapés.) (born 9 July 2001) is a Spanish field hockey player who plays as a midfielder for División de Honor club KHC Dragons and the Spain national team.

== Personal life ==
Pepe Cunill has an older brother, Pau, who also plays field hockey for Spain.

== Club career ==
In the Spanish División de Honor, Cunill plays for Atlètic Terrassa.Now he plays in Belgium in the carlsberg00hockeyleague,

with KHC Dragons.

== International career ==
=== Under–21 ===
Cunill made his debut for the Spain under-21 team in 2021, at the FIH Junior World Cup in Bhubaneswar.

=== Los Redsticks ===
In 2020, Cunill was named in Los Redsticks for the first time. He represented the team in season two of the FIH Pro League. The following year he was named in the Spanish squad again for season three of the Pro League. He made his World Cup debut at the 2023 Men's FIH Hockey World Cup.

== Honours ==
Atlètic Terrassa

- División de Honor: 2021–22
- Copa del Rey: 2021–22
