= Eliot Curty =

French field hockey player

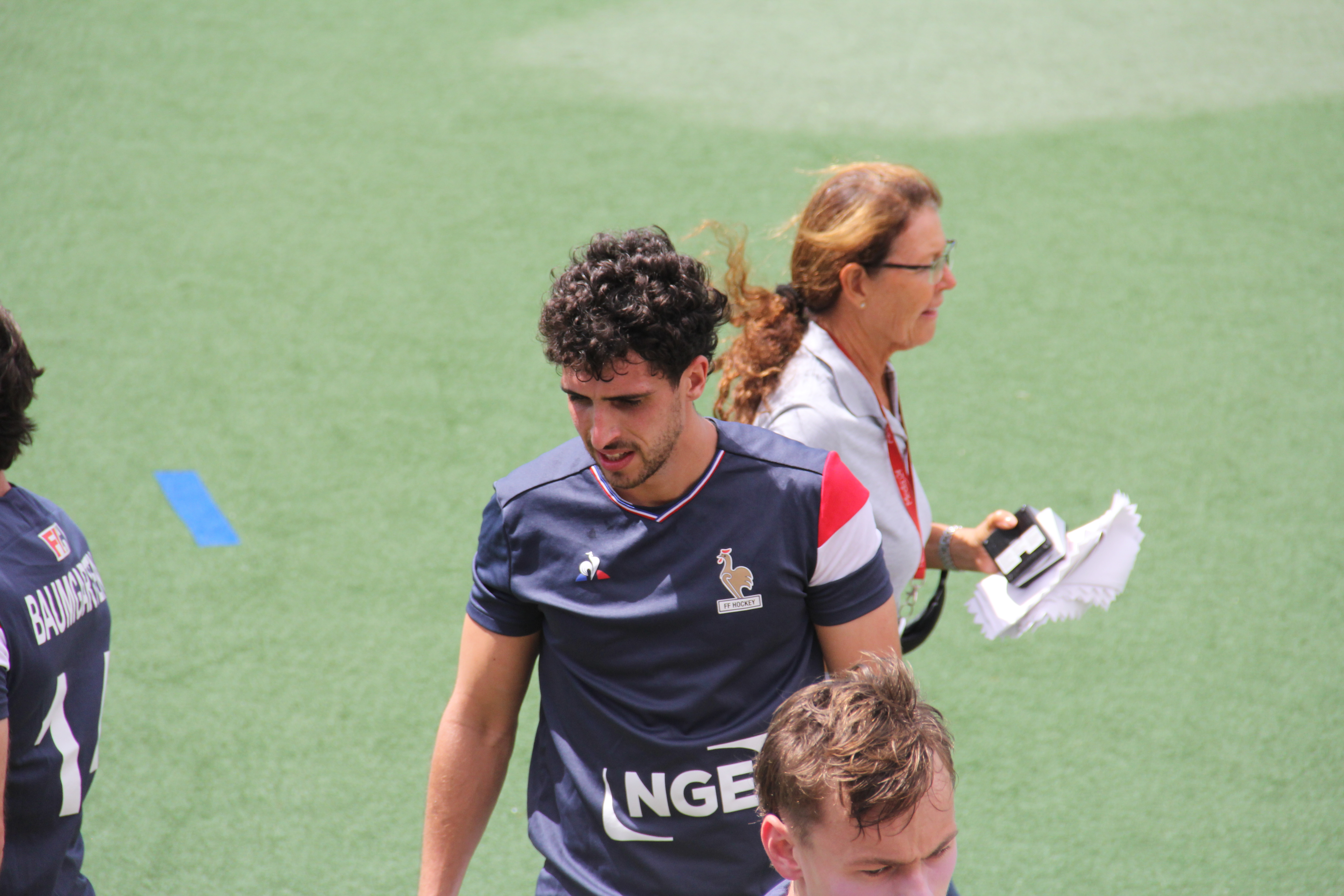
- Friendly Matches: India - France 2024

Personal information
- Full name: Eliot Hugo Curty
- Born: 18 September 1998 (age 28)
- Height: 187 cm (6 ft 2 in)
- Weight: 71 kg (157 lb)

Sport
- Sport: Field hockey
- Position: Midfielder
- Club: Waterloo Ducks
Senior career
Years	Team	Caps	Goals
–2020	Montrouge	-	-
2020–2023	Orée	-	-
2023–present	Waterloo Ducks	-	-
National team
Years	Team	Caps	Goals
2017–present	France	56	(4)
2019	France U21	5	(2)

Eliot Hugo Curty (born 18 September 1998) is a French field hockey player who plays as a midfielder for Belgian Hockey League club Waterloo Ducks and the France national team.

== Club career ==
Curty played for Montrouge before he moved to Orée in the Belgian Hockey League in 2020. After three seasons at Orée he joined the Waterloo Ducks.

== International career ==
=== Les Bleus ===
Curty made his debut for Les Bleus in 2017 during a test series against Germany in Hamburg. In 2021 Curty competed at the EuroHockey Championships in Amstelveen, Netherlands. Later that year he was also named in the French squad for the season three of the FIH Pro League.

=== Junior national team ===
Eliot Curty made his debut for the France U–21 team in 2019 at the EuroHockey Junior Championship in Valencia, Spain.
