= Gaspard Baumgarten =

French field hockey player

Personal information
- Full name: Gaspard Aurele Mare Baumgarten
- Born: 3 August 1992 (age 34) Lyon, France
- Height: 1.80 m (5 ft 11 in)
- Weight: 74 kg (163 lb)

Sport
- Sport: Field hockey
- Position: Forward
- Club: Léopold
Senior career
Years	Team	Caps	Goals
–2014	Lyon	-	-
2014–2015	Atlètic Terrassa	-	-
2015–2018	Lyon	-	-
2018–present	Léopold	-	-
National team
Years	Team	Caps	Goals
2012–2013	France U–21	12	(4)
2012–present	France	141	(29)
Medal record
Men's field hockey
Representing France
Junior World Cup
Silver medal – second place	2013 New Delhi

Gaspard Aurele Mare Baumgarten (born 3 August 1992) is a French field hockey player.

Baumgarten is sponsored by Ritual Hockey.

== Club career ==
Baumgarten joined Léopold in the Men's Belgian Hockey League in 2018. Before that he played his whole career for Lyon except for the 2014–15 season when he played for Atlètic Terrassa in Spain.

== International career ==
=== Under–21 ===
Gaspard Baumgarten debuted for the France U–21 team in 2012 at the EuroHockey Junior Championship in 's-Hertogenbosch.

The following year he went on to represent the team at the FIH Junior World Cup in New Delhi. At the tournament he won a silver medal, a history making performance for the French team.

=== Senior national team ===
Baumgarten made his debut for the French national team in 2012.

In 2018, he was represented his country at the FIH World Cup in Bhubaneswar.

Since his debut, Baumgarten has been a regular fixture in the national squad. He won his first major medal with the senior team in 2019 at the FIH Series Finals in Le Touquet, taking home a gold medal.

He was a member of the national team at the 2021 EuroHockey Championships in Amsterdam, and was also named in the French squad for the 2021–22 FIH Pro League.
