= Etienne Tynevez =

French field hockey player

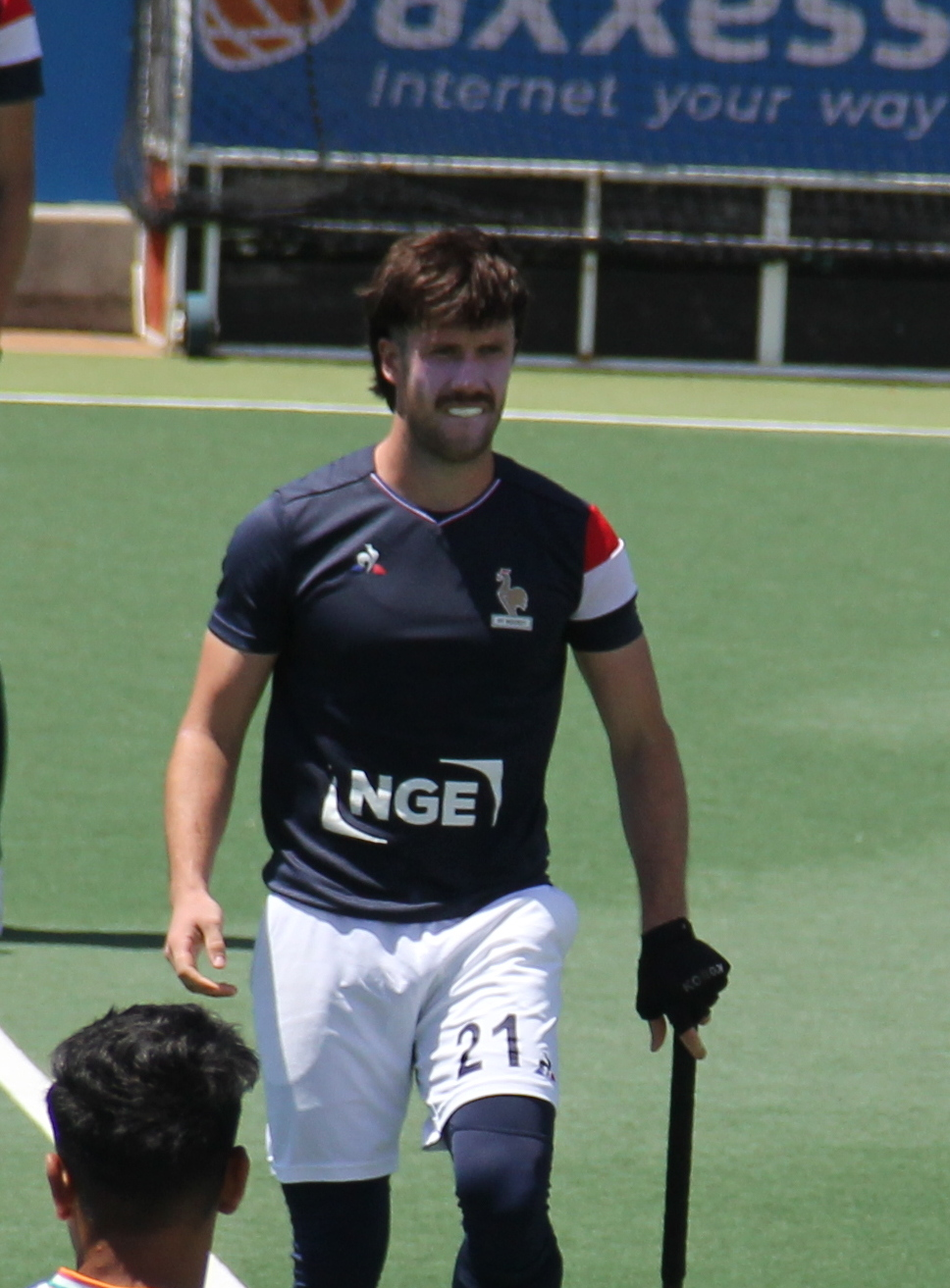
- Friendly Matches: India - France

Personal information
- Born: 13 February 1999 (age 27)
- Height: 180 cm (5 ft 11 in)
- Weight: 83 kg (183 lb)

Sport
- Sport: Field hockey
- Position: Forward
- Club: Gantoise
National team
Years	Team	Caps	Goals
2015–16	France U–18	10	(2)
2017–	France	79	(16)
Medal record
Men's field hockey
Representing France
FIH Hockey Series
Gold medal – first place	2018–19 Le Touquet	Team

Etienne Tynevez (born 13 February 1999) is a French field hockey player.

== Career ==
=== Club level ===
In club competition, Tynevez plays for Gantoise in the Belgian Hockey League.

=== Les Bleus ===
Etienne Tynevez made his debut for Les Bleus in 2017 during a Tri–Nations Tournament in Spain.

Since his debut, Tynevez became a regular inclusion in the national squad. He has appeared in a number of test–series' and competitions, including an appearance at the 2018 FIH World Cup in Bhubaneswar, where the team finished eighth.

He has since gone on to win a gold medal in the 2018–19 FIH Hockey Series in Le Touquet. He was most recently names in the national squad for season three of the FIH Pro League.
