= Steijn van Heijningen =

Dutch field hockey player (born 1997)

Personal information
- Born: 28 January 1997 (age 29) Leiderdorp, Netherlands

Sport
- Sport: Field hockey
- Position: Midfielder
- Club: Rotterdam
Youth career
- Team
- –: Alecto
Senior career
Years	Team	Caps	Goals
2015–2016	Leiden	-	-
2016–2022	HGC	-	-
2022–present	Rotterdam	-	-
National team
Years	Team	Caps	Goals
2016–2017	Netherlands U21	15	(0)
2021–present	Netherlands	52	(6)
Medal record
Men's field hockey
Representing the Netherlands
Olympic Games
Gold medal – first place	2024 Paris	Team
World Cup
Bronze medal – third place	2023 Bhubaneswar–Rourkela
EuroHockey Championship
Gold medal – first place	2023 Mönchengladbach
Silver medal – second place	2025 Mönchengladbach
EuroHockey Junior Championship
Gold medal – first place	2017 Valencia

Steijn van Heijningen (born 28 January 1997) is a Dutch field hockey player who plays as a midfielder for Hoofdklasse club Rotterdam and the Dutch national team.

== Club career ==
Van Heijningen started playing at his local club Alecto, where he played his whole youth career. He then played one year for Leiden during the 2015–16 season. After which he joined HGC. After six years at HGC he left them for Rotterdam.

== International career ==
=== Under–21 ===
Steijn van Heijningen made his debut for the national junior team in 2016 during a four-nations tournament in Hannover. Later that year he went on to represent the team at the FIH Junior World Cup in Lucknow, finishing in seventh place.

Following his debut, Van Heijningen returned to the junior national team in 2017 for the EuroHockey Junior Championship in Valencia, Spain. At the tournament he won a gold medal.

=== Oranje ===
Van Heijningen made his senior debut for the Oranje in 2021 during season three of the FIH Pro League.

He was officially named in the national senior squad in 2022. Because of an injured teammate, he participated in only the final of the 2024 Summer Olympics, winning gold.
