= Dennis Warmerdam =

Dutch field hockey player

Personal information
- Born: 6 August 1994 (age 31) Hoofddorp, Netherlands

Sport
- Sport: Field hockey
- Position: Forward
- Club: Bloemendaal
Youth career
- Years: Team
- 1999–2010: Reigers
Senior career
Years	Team	Caps	Goals
2010–2022	Pinoké	-	-
2022–present	Bloemendaal	-	-
National team
Years	Team	Caps	Goals
2014–2015	Netherlands U21	7	(1)
2021–2023	Netherlands	23	(7)
Medal record
Men's field hockey
Representing the Netherlands
EuroHockey Junior Championship
Gold medal – first place	2014 Waterloo

Dennis Warmerdam (born 6 August 1994) is a Dutch field hockey player who plays as a forward for Hoofdklasse club Bloemendaal.

== Club career ==
Warmerdam played 12 years for Pinoké before he moved to Bloemendaal for the 2022–23 season.

== International career ==
=== Under–21 ===
Warmerdam made his debut for the Netherlands U–21 team in 2014 at the EuroHockey Junior Championship in Waterloo. At the tournament he won a gold medal.

He appeared in the junior team a final time in 2015, captaining the team during a test series in Breda.

=== Oranje ===
Warmerdam made his senior debut for the Oranje in 2021 during season three of the FIH Pro League. After he was not selected in the squad for the 2023 Men's EuroHockey Championship, he announced his retirement from international hockey in September 2023.
