= Charles Masson (field hockey) =

Uruguayan field and indoor hockey player

Personal information
- Full name: Charles Elie Roger Masson
- Born: 13 April 1992 (age 34) France
- Height: 179 cm (5 ft 10 in)
- Weight: 71 kg (157 lb)

Sport
- Sport: Field hockey
- Position: Midfield
- Club: Gantoise
National team
Years	Team	Caps	Goals
2012–2013	France U–21	9	(0)
2014–	France	108	(17)
Medal record
Representing France
Men's field hockey
FIH Hockey Series
Gold medal – first place	2018–19 Le Touquet	Team
FIH Junior World Cup
Silver medal – second place	2013 New Delhi	Team

Charles Elie Roger Masson (born 13 April 1992) is a field hockey player from France.

== Career ==
=== Club level ===
In club competition, Masson plays for Gantoise in the Belgian Hockey League.

=== Under–21 ===
Charles Masson debuted for the France U–21 team in 2012 at the EuroHockey Junior Championship in 's-Hertogenbosch.

The following year he went on to represent the team at the FIH Junior World Cup in New Delhi. At the tournament he won a silver medal, a history making performance for the French team.

=== Senior national team ===
Masson made his debut for the French national team in 2014.

Since his debut, Masson has been a regular fixture in the national squad. He won his first major medal with the senior team in 2019 at the FIH Series Finals in Le Touquet, taking home a gold medal.
