= Will Calnan =

English field hockey player (born 1996)

Personal information
- Born: 17 April 1996 (age 30) London, England

Sport
- Sport: Field hockey
- Position: Forward
Senior career
Years	Team	Caps	Goals
2013–2016	Surbiton	-	-
2016–2023	Hampstead & Westminster	-	-
2023–2024	Southgate	-	-
2024–2025	HDM	-	-
2025–2026	Surbiton	-	-
National team
Years	Team	Caps	Goals
2015–2017	England & GB U21	26	-
2018–present	England & GB	99	(19)
Medal record
Men's field hockey
Representing England
EuroHockey Championship
Silver medal – second place	2023 Mönchengladbach
Commonwealth Games
Bronze medal – third place	2022 Birmingham	Team

William James Cameron Calnan (born 17 April 1996) is an English field hockey player who plays as a forward for Dutch Hoofdklasse club HDM and the England and Great Britain national teams. He competed at the 2024 Summer Olympics.

== Biography ==
Calnan, born in London, went to school at St Andrew's School in Woking and Cranleigh School, Surrey and studied at Kingston University, where he graduated with a degree in business management.

Calnan played club hockey for Surbiton in the Men's England Hockey League Premier Division from 2013 to 2016 and Hampstead & Westminster from 2016 to 2023. While at Hampstead & Westminster he made his senior Great Britain national team debut against Belgium, on 14 June 2018. He won a bronze medal with England in the Men's tournament at the 2022 Commonwealth Games in Birmingham and won a silver medal with England at the 2023 Men's EuroHockey Championship in Mönchengladbach.

Calnan transferred to Southgate Hockey Club for the 2023–24 season and on 18 June 2024, he was selected to represent Great Britain at the 2024 Summer Olympics. The team went out in the quarter-finals after losing a penalty shootout to India.

In 2024 he left England to play for HDM in the Dutch Hoofdklasse. He joined Surbiton for the 2025–26 season.
