= Tijmen Reyenga =

Dutch field hockey player (born 1999)

Personal information
- Born: 10 October 1999 (age 26) 's-Hertogenbosch, Netherlands

Sport
- Sport: Field hockey
- Position: Defender / Midfielder
- Club: Oranje-Rood
Youth career
- Team
- –: Den Bosch
Senior career
Years	Team	Caps	Goals
–2022	Den Bosch	-	-
2022–present	Oranje-Rood	-	-
National team
Years	Team	Caps	Goals
2021–present	Netherlands	51	(6)
Medal record
Men's field hockey
Representing the Netherlands
Olympic Games
Gold medal – first place	2024 Paris	Team
FIH Hockey World Cup
Bronze medal – third place	2023 Bhubaneswar–Rourkela
EuroHockey Championship
Gold medal – first place	2023 Mönchengladbach
Silver medal – second place	2025 Mönchengladbach
- Updated on 13 January 2025

Tijmen Reyenga (born 10 October 1999) is a Dutch field hockey player who plays as a defender or midfielder for Hoofdklasse club Oranje-Rood and the Netherlands national team. He represented Netherlands at the 2024 Summer Olympics.

== Club career ==
Reyenga played his whole youth career for Den Bosch and played in their first team until 2022. He moved to Oranje-Rood for the 2022–23 season.
