= Ignacio Rodríguez (field hockey) =

Spanish field hockey player

Nacho Rodríguez
Personal information
- Full name: Ignacio Rodríguez Mazón
- Born: 12 June 1996 (age 30) Santander, Spain
- Height: 1.75 m (5 ft 9 in)

Sport
- Sport: Field hockey
- Position: Defender
- Club: Club de Campo
Senior career
Years	Team	Caps	Goals
–2017	Tenis	-	-
2017–2020	Club de Campo	-	-
2020–2021	Tenis	-	-
2021–present	Club de Campo	-	-
National team
Years	Team	Caps	Goals
2016–2017	Spain U21	15	(0)
2018–2024	Spain	128	(7)
Medal record
Men's field hockey
Representing Spain
EuroHockey Championship
Silver medal – second place	2019 Antwerp
- Updated on 1 February 2025

Ignacio Rodríguez Mazón (born 12 June 1996) is a Spanish field hockey player who plays as a defender for División de Honor side Club de Campo. He played a total of 128 matches for the Spanish national team in which he scored 7 goals from 2018 until 2024.

== Club career ==
Rodríguez played for El Tenis in his birthplace Santander until 2017 when he joined Club de Campo in Madrid. After three seasons in Madrid, he returned to Tenis for the 2020–21 season. Having played one season in Santander he returned to Club de Campo.

== International career ==
Rodríguez made his debut for the senior national team in January 2018 in a test match against Wales. He represented Spain at the 2018 World Cup. At the 2019 EuroHockey Championship, he won his first medal with the national team as they finished second. After the 2024 Summer Olympics he announced his retirement from the national team, because he could not combine it anymore with his studies.
