= Niklas Bosserhoff =

German field hockey player

Personal information
- Born: 15 April 1998 (age 28) Boston, United States
- Height: 1.76 m (5 ft 9 in)

Sport
- Sport: Field hockey
- Position: Defender / Midfielder
- Club: Hamburger Polo Club
Youth career
- Team
- –: Uhlenhorst Mülheim
Senior career
Years	Team	Caps	Goals
–2022	Uhlenhorst Mülheim	-	-
2022–present	Hamburger Polo Club	-	-
National team
Years	Team	Caps	Goals
2016–2019	Germany U21	23	-
2018–present	Germany	51	(6)
Medal record
Men's field hockey
Representing Germany
EuroHockey Championship
Silver medal – second place	2021 Amstelveen
Junior World Cup
Bronze medal – third place	2016 Lucknow
EuroHockey Junior Championship
Gold medal – first place	2019 Valencia
Bronze medal – third place	2017 Valencia

Niklas Bosserhoff (born 15 April 1998) is a German field hockey player who plays as a defender for Bundesliga club Hamburger Polo Club and the German national team.

He competed in the 2020 Summer Olympics.

== Club career ==
Bosserhoff came through the youth ranks of Uhlenhorst Mülheim and played in the senior team with whom he won two Bundesliga titles. He was a total of 19 years at the club until 2022 when he left Mülheim for Hamburger Polo Club.
