= Surender Kumar =

Indian field hockey player (born 1993)

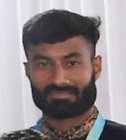
- Kumar in August 2022

Personal information
- Born: 23 November 1993 (age 32) Karnal, Haryana, India
- Height: 1.79 m (5 ft 10 in)

Sport
- Sport: Field hockey
- Position: Defender
- Club: Food Corporation of India
Senior career
| Years | Team | Caps | Goals |
| – | Food Corporation of India | - | - |
National team
| Years | Team | Caps | Goals |
| 2013 | India U21 | 11 | - |
| 2013– | India | 178 | (4) |
Medal record
Men's field hockey
Representing India
Olympic Games
| Bronze medal – third place | 2020 Tokyo | Team |
Asian Games
| Bronze medal – third place | 2018 Jakarta | Team |
Asia Cup
| Gold medal – first place | 2017 Dhaka |
Champions Trophy
| Silver medal – second place | 2016 London |
| Silver medal – second place | 2018 Breda |
Asian Champions Trophy
| Gold medal – first place | 2016 Kuantan |
| Gold medal – first place | 2018 Muscat |
Commonwealth Games
| Silver medal – second place | 2022 Birmingham | Team |

Surender Kumar (born 23 November 1993) is an Indian field hockey player, who plays as a defender for the Indian national team.

He was born to Malkhan Singh and Neelam Devi on 23 November 1993. He is from Karnal, Haryana.

He was part of the Indian hockey team that participated in the 2016 and 2020 Summer Olympics.

== See also ==
- India at the 2016 Summer Olympics
