= Niklas Wellen =

German field hockey player

Personal information
- Born: 14 December 1994 (age 31) Krefeld, Germany
- Height: 1.85 m (6 ft 1 in)
- Weight: 77 kg (170 lb)

Sport
- Sport: Field hockey
- Position: Forward
Youth career
- Team
- –: Crefelder HTC
Senior career
Years	Team	Caps	Goals
2010–2020	Crefelder HTC	-	-
2020–2022	Pinoké	-	-
2022–2026	Crefelder HTC	-	-
National team
Years	Team	Caps	Goals
2013–2024	Germany	213	(114)
Medal record
Men's field hockey
Representing Germany
Olympic Games
Silver medal – second place	2024 Paris	Team
Bronze medal – third place	2016 Rio de Janeiro	Team
World Cup
Gold medal – first place	2023 Bhubaneswar–Rourkela
EuroHockey Championship
Silver medal – second place	2015 London
Silver medal – second place	2021 Amstelveen
Champions Trophy
Gold medal – first place	2014 Bhubaneswar
Junior World Cup
Gold medal – first place	2013 New Delhi
EuroHockey Junior Championship
Silver medal – second place	2014 Waterloo
Bronze medal – third place	2012 's-Hertogenbosch
- Updated on 12 January 2024

Niklas Wellen (born 14 December 1994) is a German former field hockey player who played as a forward for Bundesliga club Crefelder HTC till May 2026. He played a total of 213 matches for the German national team from 2013 to 2024 in which he scored 114 goals.

== Club career ==
Wellen played for the first team of Crefelder HTC since he was 16 years old. In February 2020 he signed a two-year contract at Pinoké in the Netherlands from the 2020–21 season onwards. During the 2021–22 indoor season he scored the winning goal in the championship final against HDM as Pinoké won its first national title. He was named the best player of the Dutch indoor season. At the end of the outdoor season he returned to Crefelder HTC, where he ended his active professional career in May 2026.

== International career ==
He represented his country at the 2016 Summer Olympics, where he won the bronze medal. On 28 May 2021, he was named in the squads for the 2021 EuroHockey Championship and the 2020 Summer Olympics. He scored four goals in the EuroHockey tournament as they won the silver medal after they lost the final to the Netherlands after a shoot-out.

He was the Player of the Final Match, Best Forward Player, and the Player of the Tournament in the FIH Men's World Cup 2023 held in India. After the 2024 Summer Olympics, where Germany won the silver medal, he announced his retirement from the national team.

== Personal life ==
Wellen's wife Kim is the sister of NHL player Leon Draisaitl. The couple have one son born in 2023.
