= Saint Germain HC =

Saint Germain
- Full name: Saint-Germain-en-Laye Hockey Club
- League: Elite League
- Founded: 1927
- Home ground: Saint-Germain-en-Laye, France
- Website: saint-germain-hockey.fr

Saint Germain-en-laye Hockey Club, also known as Saint Germain HC, is a professional field hockey club based in Saint-Germain-en-Laye, Paris, France.

The men's 1st XI have competed in the Euro Hockey League. Where their best results were reaching the quarterfinals in the 2007–08 season and in the 2017–18 season.

== Honours ==
=== Men ===
- Champion de France masculin : 2005–06, 2006–07, 2007–08, 2008–09, 2012–13, 2013–14, 2017–18, 2018–19
- Coupe de France : 2006, 2007
- Vice-champion de France : 1977 (à 1 pt de Lyon)

=== Women ===
- EuroHockey Clubs Champions Challenge I : vainqueur en 2009 à Vienne (équipe première féminine)
- Champion de France féminin : 2006, 2008

== Internationals past and present ==
- Gérôme Branquart – France
- Hugo Genestet – France U21
- François Goyet – France
- Muriel Foulard Lazennec – France
- Jean Baptiste Pauchet – France
- Guillaume Samson – France
- Charles Verrier – France
- Martin Zylbermann – France
