= 2023 Men's EuroHockey Championship squads =

The 2023 Men's EuroHockey Championship is an international field hockey tournament held in Mönchengladbach, Germany from 19 to 27 August 2023. The eight national teams involved in the tournament are required to register a playing squad of up to 18 players.

Age, caps and club for each player are as of 19 August 2023, the first day of the tournament.

== Pool A ==
=== Austria ===
Austria announced their final squad on 13 August 2023.

Head coach: (Germany) Robin Rösch

No.	Pos.	Player	Date of birth (age)	Caps	Club
3	DF	Oliver Binder	12 July 1996 (aged 27)	63	(Germany) Hamburger Polo Club
4	MF	Fülöp Losonci	1 March 2002 (aged 21)	22	(Germany) Harvestehuder THC
5	FW	Peter Kaltenböck	20 January 1997 (aged 26)	25	(Austria) Post SV
8		Alexander Bele	6 May 1992 (aged 31)	104	(Austria) Arminen
9	FW	Michael Körper	3 December 1986 (aged 36)	168	(Germany) Harvestehuder THC
11	FW	Nikolas Wellan	11 November 2000 (aged 22)	27	(Austria) HC Wien
12		Josef Winkler	10 September 2003 (aged 19)	9	(Austria) HC Wien
13		Benjamin Stanzl	13 January 1988 (aged 35)	160	(Austria) Post SV
19		Moritz Zotter	14 August 2006 (aged 17)	3	(Germany) UHC Hamburg
20	FW	Franz Lindengrün	26 September 1995 (aged 27)	47	(Austria) HC Wien
21	MF	Benjamin Kölbl	11 May 2002 (aged 21)	26	(Germany) Hamburger Polo Club
23	FW	Fabian Unterkircher	13 August 1998 (aged 25)	54	(Netherlands) Den Bosch
24	MF	Leon Thörnblom	3 September 1995 (aged 27)	88	(Germany) Hamburger Polo Club
27	DF	Xaver Hasun (Captain)	27 June 1993 (aged 30)	129	(Germany) Harvestehuder THC
29	MF	Oliver Kern	10 August 1999 (aged 24)	40	(Austria) AHTC
30		Mateusz Nyckowiak	24 January 2004 (aged 19)	8	(Austria) Post SV
32	GK	Mateusz Szymczyk	5 December 1988 (aged 34)	108	(Austria) Arminen
33	GK	Hakob Kastner	10 January 2000 (aged 23)	2	(Austria) Post SV

=== Belgium ===
Belgium announced their final squad on 31 July 2023.

Head coach: (Netherlands) Michel van den Heuvel

No.	Pos.	Player	Date of birth (age)	Caps	Club
2	GK	Loic Van Doren	14 September 1996 (aged 26)	50	(Belgium) Dragons
4	DF	Arthur Van Doren	1 October 1994 (aged 28)	227	(Netherlands) Bloemendaal
7	MF	John-John Dohmen	24 January 1988 (aged 35)	453	(Belgium) Orée
8	FW	Florent van Aubel	25 October 1991 (aged 31)	279	(Netherlands) Pinoké
10	FW	Cédric Charlier	27 November 1987 (aged 35)	365	(Belgium) Racing
12	DF	Gauthier Boccard	26 August 1991 (aged 31)	276	(Belgium) Léopold
13	FW	Nicolas De Kerpel	23 March 1993 (aged 30)	107	(Belgium) Herakles
15	DF	Emmanuel Stockbroekx	23 December 1993 (aged 29)	188	(Belgium) Orée
16	DF	Alexander Hendrickx	6 August 1993 (aged 30)	170	(Netherlands) Pinoké
19	MF	Félix Denayer (Captain)	31 January 1990 (aged 33)	375	(Belgium) Dragons
20	FW	William Ghislain	28 July 1999 (aged 24)	24	(Belgium) Waterloo Ducks
21	GK	Vincent Vanasch	21 December 1987 (aged 35)	269	(Germany) Rot-Weiss Köln
23	DF	Arthur De Sloover	3 May 1997 (aged 26)	142	(Netherlands) Oranje-Rood
24	MF	Antoine Kina	13 February 1996 (aged 27)	105	(Belgium) Gantoise
25	DF	Loïck Luypaert	19 August 1991 (aged 32)	289	(Belgium) Braxgata
26	MF	Victor Wegnez	25 December 1995 (aged 27)	147	(Belgium) Racing
30	FW	Nelson Onana	1 March 2000 (aged 23)	15	(Belgium) Braxgata
31	MF	Arno Van Dessel	3 July 2003 (aged 20)	18	(Belgium) Herakles

=== England ===
England announced their final squad on 3 August 2023.

Head coach: (South Africa) Paul Revington

No.	Pos.	Player	Date of birth (age)	Caps	Club
2	DF	Nick Park	8 April 1999 (aged 24)	16	(England) Surbiton
3	DF	Jack Waller	28 January 1997 (aged 26)	38	(England) Wimbledon
5	DF	David Ames (Captain)	25 June 1989 (aged 34)	59	(England) Holcombe
7	MF	Zachary Wallace	29 September 1999 (aged 23)	43	(Netherlands) HGC
13	FW	Sam Ward	24 December 1990 (aged 32)	92	(England) Old Georgians
14	DF	James Albery	2 October 1995 (aged 27)	35	(England) Old Georgians
15	MF	Phil Roper	24 January 1992 (aged 31)	114	(England) Holcombe
16	GK	James Mazarelo	4 February 2001 (aged 22)	6	(England) Surbiton
18	DF	Brendan Creed	3 January 1993 (aged 30)	68	(England) Surbiton
19	MF	David Goodfield	15 June 1993 (aged 30)	72	(England) Surbiton
20	GK	Ollie Payne	6 April 1999 (aged 24)	30	(England) Holcombe
23	FW	Nick Bandurak	14 December 1992 (aged 30)	28	(England) Holcombe
24	MF	James Oates	18 April 1998 (aged 25)	13	(England) Hampstead & Westminster
26	MF	James Gall	20 May 1995 (aged 28)	63	(England) Surbiton
29	MF	Tom Sorsby	28 October 1996 (aged 26)	37	(England) Surbiton
30	DF	Conor Williamson	20 December 2001 (aged 21)	2	(England) University of Nottingham
31	FW	Will Calnan	17 April 1996 (aged 27)	44	(England) Hampstead & Westminster
33	MF	Tim Nurse	11 May 1999 (aged 24)	10	(England) Surbiton

=== Spain ===
Spain announced their final squad on 11 August 2023.

Head coach: (Argentina) Maximiliano Caldas

No.	Pos.	Player	Date of birth (age)	Caps	Club
2	DF	Alejandro Alonso	14 February 1999 (aged 24)	74	(Spain) Tenis
6	MF	Xavier Gispert	4 January 1999 (aged 24)	55	(Spain) Club Egara
7	MF	Enrique González	29 April 1996 (aged 27)	184	(Spain) Club de Campo
8	DF	Marc Recasens	13 September 1999 (aged 23)	69	(Spain) Club Egara
9	FW	Álvaro Iglesias	1 March 1993 (aged 30)	211	(Spain) Club de Campo
10	FW	José Basterra	3 January 1997 (aged 26)	52	(Spain) Club de Campo
12	FW	Marc Reyné	18 May 1999 (aged 24)	44	(Spain) Real Club de Polo
14	MF	Marc Miralles (Captain)	14 November 1997 (aged 25)	93	(Spain) Real Club de Polo
15	DF	Jordi Bonastre	7 August 2000 (aged 23)	50	(Spain) Atlètic Terrassa
17	DF	Pepe Cunill	9 July 2001 (aged 22)	35	(Spain) Atlètic Terrassa
18	FW	Joaquín Menini	18 August 1991 (aged 32)	43	(Netherlands) Rotterdam
20	DF	Pau Cunill	4 January 2000 (aged 23)	36	(Spain) Atlètic Terrassa
21	GK	Adrian Rafi	8 January 1997 (aged 26)	47	(Spain) Barcelona
24	DF	Ignacio Rodríguez	12 June 1996 (aged 27)	98	(Spain) Club de Campo
29	MF	Gerard Clapés	13 September 2000 (aged 22)	47	(Spain) Club Egara
42	GK	Luis Calzado	15 November 2000 (aged 22)	18	(Spain) Real Club de Polo
90	FW	Borja Lacalle	21 May 2001 (aged 22)	35	(Spain) Club de Campo
99	MF	Rafael Vilallonga	28 November 2001 (aged 21)	27	(Spain) Club de Campo

== Pool B ==
=== France ===
France announced their final squad on 17 August 2023.

Head coach: Fred Soyez

No.	Pos.	Player	Date of birth (age)	Caps	Club
1	GK	Arthur Thieffry	15 September 1989 (aged 33)	108	(Belgium) Orée
3	DF	Mattéo Desgouillons	21 January 2000 (aged 23)	37	(Belgium) Gantoise
6	DF	Gaspard Xavier	10 May 2002 (aged 21)	29	(Belgium) Racing Club de Bruxelles
7	MF	Lucas Montecot	4 September 2001 (aged 21)	2	(France) Montrouge
8	MF	Simon Martin-Brisac	20 November 1992 (aged 30)	138	Racing Club de France
10	DF	Viktor Lockwood (Captain)	29 March 1992 (aged 31)	152	(France) Lille
11	MF	Charles Masson	13 April 1992 (aged 31)	131	(Belgium) Gantoise
12	DF	Amaury Bellenger	14 August 1998 (aged 25)	60	(Belgium) Uccle Sport
16	MF	François Goyet	4 November 1994 (aged 28)	143	(Belgium) Gantoise
17	FW	Noé Jouin	2 August 2002 (aged 21)	14	(France) Saint Germain
19	FW	Corentin Sellier	29 May 2001 (aged 22)	21	(France) Montrouge
20	MF	Eliot Curty	18 September 1998 (aged 24)	55	(Belgium) Orée
21	FW	Etienne Tynevez	13 February 1999 (aged 24)	106	(Belgium) Gantoise
23	FW	Benjamin Marqué	11 August 2000 (aged 23)	18	(Belgium) Daring
24		Théophile Ponthieu	19 April 1994 (aged 29)	24	(France) Lille
28	FW	Timothée Clément	8 April 2000 (aged 23)	55	(Belgium) Gantoise
30	GK	Edgar Reynaud	17 April 1992 (aged 31)	42	(Belgium) Léopold
31	DF	Brieuc Delemazure	2 April 2002 (aged 21)	18	(France) Lille

=== Germany ===
Germany announced their final squad 25 July 2023.

Head coach: André Henning

No.	Pos.	Player	Date of birth (age)	Caps	Club
1	GK	Alexander Stadler	16 October 1999 (aged 23)	44	(Netherlands) Den Bosch
2	DF	Mathias Müller	3 April 1992 (aged 31)	143	(Germany) Hamburger Polo Club
3	MF	Mats Grambusch (Captain)	4 November 1992 (aged 30)	186	(Germany) Rot-Weiss Köln
4	DF	Lukas Windfeder	11 May 1995 (aged 28)	149	(Germany) Uhlenhorst Mülheim
7	FW	Thies Prinz	7 July 1998 (aged 25)	51	(Germany) Rot-Weiss Köln
9	FW	Niklas Wellen	14 December 1994 (aged 28)	185	(Germany) Crefelder HTC
10	DF	Johannes Große	7 January 1997 (aged 26)	90	(Germany) Rot-Weiss Köln
12	FW	Timm Herzbruch	7 June 1997 (aged 26)	99	(Germany) Uhlenhorst Mülheim
14	DF	Teo Hinrichs	17 September 1999 (aged 23)	50	(Germany) Mannheimer HC
15	DF	Tom Grambusch	4 August 1995 (aged 28)	96	(Germany) Rot-Weiss Köln
16	DF	Gonzalo Peillat	12 August 1992 (aged 31)	29	(Germany) Mannheimer HC
19	FW	Justus Weigand	20 April 2000 (aged 23)	36	(Germany) Mannheimer HC
23	MF	Martin Zwicker	27 February 1987 (aged 36)	294	(Germany) Berliner HC
25	MF	Hannes Müller	18 May 2000 (aged 23)	33	(Germany) UHC Hamburg
29	FW	Malte Hellwig	23 October 1997 (aged 25)	43	(Germany) Uhlenhorst Mülheim
27	MF	Timur Oruz	27 October 1994 (aged 28)	110	(Germany) Rot-Weiss Köln
44	DF	Moritz Ludwig	14 September 2001 (aged 21)	29	(Germany) Uhlenhorst Mülheim
74	GK	Jean Danneberg	8 November 2002 (aged 20)	13	(Germany) Rot-Weiss Köln

=== Netherlands ===
The Netherlands announced their final squad on 1 August 2023. Tjep Hoedemakers withdrew injured on 15 August 2023 and was replaced by Floris Middendorp.

Head coach: Jeroen Delmee

No.	Pos.	Player	Date of birth (age)	Caps	Club
1	GK	Maurits Visser	8 June 1995 (aged 28)	26	(Netherlands) Bloemendaal
4	DF	Lars Balk	26 February 1996 (aged 27)	117	(Netherlands) Kampong
6	MF	Jonas de Geus	29 April 1998 (aged 25)	126	(Netherlands) Kampong
7	FW	Thijs van Dam	5 January 1997 (aged 26)	99	(Netherlands) Rotterdam
8	FW	Thierry Brinkman (Captain)	19 March 1995 (aged 28)	155	(Netherlands) Bloemendaal
10	MF	Jorrit Croon	9 August 1998 (aged 25)	122	(Netherlands) Bloemendaal
11	FW	Terrance Pieters	14 December 1996 (aged 26)	56	(Netherlands) Kampong
16	DF	Floris Wortelboer	4 August 1996 (aged 27)	90	(Netherlands) Bloemendaal
20	GK	Derk Meijer	12 May 1997 (aged 26)	7	(Netherlands) Rotterdam
22	FW	Koen Bijen	27 July 1998 (aged 25)	38	(Netherlands) Den Bosch
23	DF	Joep de Mol	10 December 1995 (aged 27)	128	(Netherlands) Oranje-Rood
24	MF	Steijn van Heijningen	28 January 1997 (aged 26)	36	(Netherlands) Rotterdam
27	DF	Jip Janssen	14 October 1997 (aged 25)	87	(Netherlands) Kampong
29	MF	Tijmen Reijenga	10 October 1999 (aged 23)	34	(Netherlands) Oranje-Rood
32	DF	Justen Blok	27 September 2000 (aged 22)	47	(Netherlands) Rotterdam
34	DF	Derck de Vilder	23 November 1998 (aged 24)	43	(Netherlands) Kampong
43	FW	Floris Middendorp	4 June 2001 (aged 22)	15	(Netherlands) Amsterdam
51	FW	Duco Telgenkamp	17 July 2002 (aged 21)	6	(Netherlands) Kampong

=== Wales ===
Wales announced their final squad on 9 August 2023.

Head coach: Daniel Newcombe

No.	Pos.	Player	Date of birth (age)	Caps	Club
2	GK	Dewi Roblin	10 February 1994 (aged 29)	10	(England) Hampstead & Westminster
3	DF	Daniel Kyriakides	21 March 1995 (aged 28)	115	(Germany) Club an der Alster
6	DF	Jacob Draper	24 July 1998 (aged 25)	76	(England) Hampstead & Westminster
9	MF	Rupert Shipperley (Captain)	21 November 1992 (aged 30)	101	(England) Hampstead & Westminster
10	DF	Rhodri Furlong	18 October 1995 (aged 27)	77	(England) Holcombe
12	DF	Stephen Kelly	12 May 1992 (aged 31)	80	(England) Hampstead & Westminster
13	MF	Dale Hutchinson	23 October 1993 (aged 29)	104	(England) Hampstead & Westminster
15	MF	Rhys Bradshaw	19 September 2000 (aged 22)	51	(England) Wimbledon
18	DF	Gareth Furlong	10 May 1992 (aged 31)	143	(England) Surbiton
19	FW	Owain Dolan-Gray	17 December 1990 (aged 32)	138	(Wales) Cardiff & Met
20	FW	Jolyon Morgan	9 March 1999 (aged 24)	29	(England) Hampstead & Westminster
23	FW	Jack Pritchard	14 August 1993 (aged 30)	16	(Wales) Cardiff & Met
24	DF	Hywel Jones	9 July 1997 (aged 26)	55	(England) Hampstead & Westminster
25	FW	Benjamin Francis	20 March 1996 (aged 27)	97	(England) Wimbledon
26	FW	Luke Hawker (Captain)	29 December 1989 (aged 33)	121	(Wales) Cardiff & Met
31	MF	Gareth Griffiths	13 March 1999 (aged 24)	22	(England) Beeston
35	MF	Fred Newbold	29 March 2001 (aged 22)	15	(England) Reading
50	GK	Toby Reynolds-Cotterill	6 August 1997 (aged 26)	20	(England) Hampstead & Westminster
