= 2025 Men's EuroHockey Championship squads =

The 2025 Men's EuroHockey Championship will be an international men's field hockey tournament held in Mönchengladbach, Germany from 8 to 16 August 2025. The eight national teams involved in the tournament are required to register a playing squad of up to 18 players.

Age, caps and club for each player are as of 8 August 2025, the first day of the tournament.

== Pool A ==
=== Austria ===
Head coach: (Germany) Robin Rösch

Austria announced their final squad on 3 August 2025.

No.	Pos.	Player	Date of birth (age)	Caps	Club
4	FW	Fülöp Losonci (Captain)	1 March 2002 (aged 23)	50	(Germany) Harvestehuder THC
5	MF	Peter Kaltenböck	20 January 1997 (aged 28)	48	(Austria) Post SV
6		Arthur Kucera	7 September 2007 (aged 17)	9	(Austria) WAC
11	FW	Nikolas Wellan	11 November 2000 (aged 24)	52	(Germany) Grossflottbeker THGC
12	FW	Josef Winkler	10 September 2003 (aged 21)	38	(Austria) HC Wien
15		Florian Steyrer	22 November 1996 (aged 28)	85	(Austria) SV Arminen
16		Maximilian Scholz	28 November 1999 (aged 25)	27	(Belgium) Daring
17	MF	Moritz Frey	6 January 2001 (aged 24)	31	(Germany) Harvestehuder THC
18		Florian Hackl	18 August 2002 (aged 22)	21	(Austria) SV Arminen
19		Maximilian Kelner	7 January 2003 (aged 22)	22	(Austria) SV Arminen
25	MF	Bastian Valas	2 November 2000 (aged 24)	34	(Belgium) Leuven
27	MF	Benjamin Kölbl (Captain)	11 May 2002 (aged 23)	47	(Germany) Hamburger Polo Club
29	DF	Oliver Kern	10 August 1999 (aged 25)	63	(Austria) AHTC
30	DF	Mateusz Nyckowiak	24 January 2004 (aged 21)	36	(Austria) Post SV
33	GK	Jakob Kastner	10 January 2000 (aged 25)	14	(Austria) Post SV
36		Adrian Fink	13 January 2006 (aged 19)	7	(Austria) AHTC
37		Jakob Bauer	18 February 2007 (aged 18)	0	(Austria) WAC
41	GK	Laurenzo Rizzi	22 May 1998 (aged 27)	11	(Austria) AHTC

=== Belgium ===
Head coach: (New Zealand) Shane McLeod

Belgium announced their final squad on 12 June 2025.

No.	Pos.	Player	Date of birth (age)	Caps	Club
1	GK	Simon Vandenbroucke	6 June 1999 (aged 26)	13	(Belgium) Waterloo Ducks
4	DF	Arthur Van Doren (Captain)	1 October 1994 (aged 30)	262	(Belgium) Braxgata
5	MF	Arno Van Dessel	3 July 2003 (aged 22)	50	(Belgium) Herakles
6	MF	Lucas Balthazar	8 January 2006 (aged 19)	11	(Belgium) Uccle Sport
7	FW	Thibeau Stockbroekx	20 July 2000 (aged 25)	60	(Netherlands) Oranje-Rood
9	DF	Maxime Van Oost	2 December 1999 (aged 25)	59	(Belgium) Waterloo Ducks
11	DF	Tommy Willems	13 April 1997 (aged 28)	36	(Belgium) Waterloo Ducks
13	FW	Nicolas De Kerpel	23 March 1993 (aged 32)	141	(Belgium) Herakles
14	GK	Loic Van Doren	14 September 1996 (aged 28)	71	(Belgium) Dragons
16	DF	Alexander Hendrickx	6 August 1993 (aged 32)	205	(Belgium) Gantoise
17	FW	Guillaume Hellin	28 May 2001 (aged 24)	20	(Belgium) Gantoise
18	FW	Roman Duvekot	21 June 2000 (aged 25)	19	(Belgium) Gantoise
23	DF	Arthur De Sloover	3 May 1997 (aged 28)	182	(Netherlands) Oranje-Rood
24	MF	Antoine Kina	13 February 1996 (aged 29)	134	(Belgium) Gantoise
26	MF	Victor Wegnez	25 December 1995 (aged 29)	185	(Belgium) Waterloo Ducks
27	FW	Tom Boon	25 January 1990 (aged 35)	369	(Belgium) Léopold
30	FW	Nelson Onana	1 March 2000 (aged 25)	52	(Belgium) Léopold
37	FW	Thomas Crols	11 September 2003 (aged 21)	18	(Belgium) Dragons

=== Netherlands ===
Head coach: Jeroen Delmee

The Netherlands announced their final squad on 22 July 2025.

No.	Pos.	Player	Date of birth (age)	Caps	Club
1	GK	Maurits Visser	8 June 1995 (aged 30)	44	(Netherlands) Bloemendaal
2	DF	Jip Janssen	14 October 1997 (aged 27)	127	(Netherlands) Kampong
4	DF	Lars Balk	26 February 1996 (aged 29)	149	(Netherlands) Kampong
7	FW	Thijs van Dam	5 January 1997 (aged 28)	130	(Netherlands) Rotterdam
8	FW	Thierry Brinkman (Captain)	19 March 1995 (aged 30)	195	(Netherlands) Den Bosch
9	FW	Koen Bijen	27 July 1998 (aged 27)	81	(Netherlands) Den Bosch
10	MF	Jorrit Croon	9 August 1998 (aged 26)	162	(Netherlands) Bloemendaal
11	FW	Terrance Pieters	14 December 1996 (aged 28)	89	(Netherlands) Kampong
12	DF	Justen Blok	27 September 2000 (aged 24)	86	(Netherlands) Rotterdam
14	DF	Derck de Vilder	23 November 1998 (aged 26)	86	(Netherlands) Kampong
16	DF	Floris Wortelboer	4 August 1996 (aged 29)	129	(Netherlands) Bloemendaal
18	FW	Olivier Hortensius	4 September 2002 (aged 22)	2	(Netherlands) Rotterdam
19	FW	Tjep Hoedemakers	14 October 1999 (aged 25)	68	(Netherlands) Rotterdam
20	GK	Derk Meijer	12 May 1997 (aged 28)	20	(Netherlands) Rotterdam
23	DF	Joep de Mol	10 December 1995 (aged 29)	170	(Netherlands) Oranje-Rood
24	MF	Steijn van Heijningen	28 January 1997 (aged 28)	66	(Netherlands) Rotterdam
29	MF	Tijmen Reijenga	10 October 1999 (aged 25)	62	(Netherlands) Oranje-Rood
77	MF	Floris Middendorp	4 June 2001 (aged 24)	55	(Netherlands) Amsterdam

=== Spain ===
Head coach: (Argentina) Maximiliano Caldas

The Spain announced their final squad on 22 July 2025.

No.	Pos.	Player	Date of birth (age)	Caps	Club
2	DF	Alejandro Alonso	14 February 1999 (aged 26)	117	(Spain) Tenis
5	DF	Jordi Bonastre	7 August 2000 (aged 25)	88	(Spain) Atlètic Terrassa
6	MF	Xavier Gispert	4 January 1999 (aged 26)	83	(Australia) Canberra Chill
8	DF	Marc Recasens	13 September 1999 (aged 25)	113	(Netherlands) Rotterdam
9	FW	Álvaro Iglesias	1 March 1993 (aged 32)	241	(Spain) Club de Campo
10	FW	José Basterra	3 January 1997 (aged 28)	90	(Belgium) Royal Léopold
11	MF	Gerard Clapés	13 September 2000 (aged 24)	89	(Netherlands) Oranje-Rood
12	FW	Marc Reyné (Captain)	18 May 1999 (aged 26)	83	(Belgium) Braxgata
14	MF	Marc Miralles	14 November 1997 (aged 27)	131	(Netherlands) Bloemendaal
15	GK	Luis Calzado	15 November 2000 (aged 24)	61	(Spain) Real Club de Polo
16	GK	Rafael Revilla	16 February 1998 (aged 27)	26	(Spain) Club de Campo
17	DF	Pepe Cunill	9 July 2001 (aged 24)	81	(Spain) Atlètic Terrassa
18	FW	Joaquín Menini	18 August 1991 (aged 33)	83	(Netherlands) Rotterdam
21	FW	Borja Lacalle	21 May 2001 (aged 24)	71	(Netherlands) Oranje-Rood
22	MF	Pol Cabré-Verdiell	22 April 2003 (aged 22)	18	(Spain) Atlètic Terrassa
23	DF	Marc Vizcaino	30 April 1999 (aged 26)	27	(Netherlands) HC 's-Hertogenbosch
26	MF	Bruno Font	15 November 2004 (aged 20)	46	(Spain) Junior FC
28	FW	Nicolás Álvarez	4 January 2003 (aged 22)	19	(Spain) Real Sociedad

== Pool B ==
=== England ===
Head coach: (Wales) Zak Jones

England announced their final squad on 22 July 2025.

No.	Pos.	Player	Date of birth (age)	Caps	Club
2	DF	Nick Park	8 April 1999 (aged 26)	57	(England) Surbiton
3	DF	Jack Waller	28 January 1997 (aged 28)	134	(Netherlands) Pinoké
5	MF	Tom Sorsby	28 October 1996 (aged 28)	120	(Netherlands) Den Bosch
7	MF	Zachary Wallace (Captain)	29 September 1999 (aged 25)	135	(Netherlands) Bloemendaal
8	MF	Jacob Payton	10 June 2002 (aged 23)	13	(England) Surbiton
13	FW	Sam Ward	24 December 1990 (aged 34)	230	(England) Old Georgians
14	DF	James Albery	2 October 1995 (aged 29)	90	(England) Old Georgians
15	MF	Phil Roper	24 January 1992 (aged 33)	227	(England) Old Georgians
16	GK	James Mazarelo	4 February 2001 (aged 24)	42	(England) Surbiton
17	MF	Stuart Rushmere	9 September 2000 (aged 24)	57	(England) Surbiton
18	MF	Tim Nurse	11 May 1999 (aged 26)	53	(England) Surbiton
19	MF	David Goodfield	15 June 1993 (aged 32)	118	(England) Surbiton
26	MF	James Gall	20 May 1995 (aged 30)	140	(England) Surbiton
27	DF	Liam Sanford	14 March 1996 (aged 29)	127	(England) Old Georgians
30	DF	Conor Williamson	20 December 2001 (aged 23)	38	(England) Surbiton
32	GK	James Carleton	18 January 2005 (aged 20)	0	(England) Exeter University
33	DF	Sam Hooper	7 August 1998 (aged 27)	9	(England) Wimbledon
47	DF	Ben Fox	15 September 2001 (aged 23)	10	(England) Wimbledon

=== France ===
Head coach: (Belgium) John-John Dohmen

France announced their final squad on 29 July 2025.

No.	Pos.	Player	Date of birth (age)	Caps	Club
1	GK	Edgar Reynaud	17 April 1992 (aged 33)	49	(Belgium) Léopold
3	DF	Mattéo Desgouillons	21 January 2000 (aged 25)	56	(France) CA Montrouge
4	DF	Brieuc Delemazure	2 April 2002 (aged 23)	41	(France) Lille
5	MF	Stanislas Branicki	9 April 2002 (aged 23)	34	(Belgium) Royal Orée
6	FW	Corentin Sellier	29 May 2001 (aged 24)	34	(France) CA Montrouge
7	MF	Lucas Montecot	4 September 2001 (aged 23)	21	(France) CA Montrouge
8	FW	Xavier Esmenjaud	22 June 1997 (aged 28)	14	(Belgium) Royal Herakles
12	DF	Gaspard Xavier	10 May 2002 (aged 23)	45	(Belgium) Racing Club de Bruxelles
13	MF	Benjamin Marqué	11 August 2000 (aged 24)	27	(Belgium) Royal Daring
14	MF	Malo Martinache	8 April 2007 (aged 18)	2	(France) Lille MHC
16	MF	François Goyet (Captain)	4 November 1994 (aged 30)	165	(Belgium) Gantoise
18	MF	Eliot Curty	18 September 1998 (aged 26)	77	(Belgium) Waterloo Ducks
21	FW	Etienne Tynevez	13 February 1999 (aged 26)	128	(Belgium) Gantoise
22	DF	Victor Charlet	19 November 1993 (aged 31)	171	(Belgium) Waterloo Ducks
24	DF	Amaury Bellenger	14 August 1998 (aged 26)	83	(Belgium) Uccle Sport
28	FW	Timothée Clément	8 April 2000 (aged 25)	73	(Belgium) Gantoise
31	GK	Corentin Saunier	1 February 1994 (aged 31)	47	Racing Club de France
95	MF	Louis Haertelmeyer	9 April 2003 (aged 22)	8	(France) CA Montrouge

=== Germany ===
Head coach: André Henning

Germany announced their final squad on 14 July 2025.

No.	Pos.	Player	Date of birth (age)	Caps	Club
1	GK	Alexander Stadler	16 October 1999 (aged 25)	62	(Netherlands) Den Bosch
3	MF	Mats Grambusch (Captain)	4 November 1992 (aged 32)	213	(Germany) Gladbacher HTC
4	DF	Lukas Windfeder	11 May 1995 (aged 30)	173	(Germany) Uhlenhorst Mülheim
6	FW	Raphael Hartkopf	24 November 1998 (aged 26)	42	(Germany) Mannheimer HC
7	FW	Thies Prinz	7 July 1998 (aged 27)	98	(Germany) Rot-Weiss Köln
8	DF	Benedikt Schwarzhaupt	14 January 2001 (aged 24)	43	(Spain) Real Club de Polo
10	DF	Johannes Große	7 January 1997 (aged 28)	136	(Germany) Club an der Alster
13	MF	Paul-Philipp Kaufmann	21 June 1996 (aged 29)	72	(Germany) Hamburger Polo Club
14	DF	Teo Hinrichs	17 September 1999 (aged 25)	86	(Spain) Real Club de Polo
15	DF	Tom Grambusch	4 August 1995 (aged 30)	150	(Germany) Rot-Weiss Köln
16	DF	Gonzalo Peillat	12 August 1992 (aged 32)	74	(Germany) Mannheimer HC
19	FW	Justus Weigand	20 April 2000 (aged 25)	68	(Germany) Mannheimer HC
21	MF	Michel Struthoff	19 April 2003 (aged 22)	32	(Germany) Rot-Weiss Köln
24	MF	Erik Kleinlein	3 December 2001 (aged 23)	24	(Germany) Mannheimer HC
25	MF	Hannes Müller	18 May 2000 (aged 25)	78	(Germany) UHC Hamburg
29	FW	Malte Hellwig	23 October 1997 (aged 27)	76	(Germany) Uhlenhorst Mülheim
44	DF	Moritz Ludwig	14 September 2001 (aged 23)	70	(Germany) Uhlenhorst Mülheim
74	GK	Jean Danneberg	8 November 2002 (aged 22)	44	(Germany) Rot-Weiss Köln

=== Poland ===
Head coach: Dariusz Rachwalski

Poland announced their final squad on 5 August 2025.

No.	Pos.	Player	Date of birth (age)	Caps	Club
1	GK	Mateusz Popiołkowski	21 April 1994 (aged 31)	67	(Poland) Politechnika Poznańska
2		Mikołaj Głowacki	18 March 1999 (aged 26)	47	(Poland) Grunwald Poznań
4		Tomasz Bembenek	17 January 2000 (aged 25)	45	(Germany) DTV Hannover
7		Gracjan Jarzyński	1 April 2001 (aged 24)	45	(Germany) Harvestehuder THC
8		Mikołaj Gumny	22 November 1994 (aged 30)	102	(Poland) Warta Poznań
9		Jacek Kurowski (Captain)	17 April 1998 (aged 27)	80	(Germany) TSV Mannheim
10	DF	Maksymilian Koperski	23 July 1999 (aged 26)	51	(Netherlands) Oranje-Rood
11		Damian Jarzembowski	2 February 1997 (aged 28)	26	(Poland) Grunwald Poznań
12	GK	Maciej Pacanowski	21 September 1992 (aged 32)	74	(Poland) Start Gniezno
14		Robert Pawlak	10 May 2003 (aged 22)	40	(Poland) Politechnika Poznańska
16		Jakub Janicki	9 September 1996 (aged 28)	86	(Poland) Gąsawa
17		Patryk Pawlak	19 November 1996 (aged 28)	62	(Poland) AZS AWF Poznań
21		Jakub Chumeńczuk	24 November 2000 (aged 24)	32	(Germany) Klipper THC
22		Wojciech Rutkowski	27 August 2000 (aged 24)	32	(Poland) Pomorzanin Toruń
23		Eryk Bembenek	25 November 2001 (aged 23)	40	(Germany) DTV Hannover
24		Mateusz Nowakowski	23 February 1998 (aged 27)	51	(Germany) DTV Hannover
26		Michał Kasprzyk	22 August 1993 (aged 31)	84	(Poland) Pomorzanin Toruń
27		Michał Lange	15 October 2000 (aged 24)	40	(Poland) Grunwald Poznań
28		Jakub Hołosyniuk	3 March 2004 (aged 21)	28	(Poland) Politechnika Poznańska
