= 2016 Boys' EuroHockey Youth Championships =

Tournament details
- Host country: Ireland
- City: Cork
- Dates: 24–30 July
- Teams: 8
- Venue(s): Mardyke Arena

Final positions
- Champions: Germany (3rd title)
- Runner-up: Netherlands
- Third place: Belgium

Tournament statistics
- Matches played: 20
- Goals scored: 131 (6.55 per match)
- Top scorer(s): (Germany) Jan Schiffer (9 goals)

The 2015 Boys' EuroHockey Youth Championships was the 9th edition of the Boys' EuroHockey Youth Championships. It was held from 24 to 30 July 2016 in Cork, Ireland at the Mardyke Arena.

Germany were the defending champions. The Czech Republic and Italy have been promoted from the Youth Championship II.

== Qualified teams ==
- Belgium
- England
- Germany
- Ireland
- Italy ▲
- Netherlands
- Czech Republic ▲
- Spain

== Format ==
The eight teams will be split into two groups of four teams. The top two teams advance to the semifinals to determine the winner in a knockout system. The bottom two teams play in a new group with the teams they did not play against in the group stage. The last two teams will be relegated to the Youth Championship II.

== Results ==
All times are local (UTC+2).

=== Preliminary round ===
==== Pool A ====
Pos	Team	Pld	W	D	L	GF	GA	GD	Pts	Qualification
1	Germany	3	2	1	0	17	2	+15	7	Semifinals
2	Belgium	3	2	1	0	13	3	+10	7	Semifinals
3	Ireland (H)	3	1	0	2	12	9	+3	3	
4	Czech Republic	3	0	0	3	1	29	−28	0	

Source: EHF
Rules for classification: 1) points; 2) goal difference; 3) goals scored; 4) head-to-head result.
(H) Hosts

24 July 2016
09:45

Belgium	8–0	Czech Republic
Freyling 4', 45'; De Chaffoy 29', 38'; Gougnard 35', 53'; Ghislain 57'; Sidler 61'	Report

Umpires:
Paul van den Assum (NED)
Vincenzo Ilgrande (ITA)

24 July 2016
12:00

Germany	5–0	Ireland
Bock 13'; Schiffer 25', 60'; Knobling 45'; Hinrichs 63'	Report

Umpires:
Sean Edwards (ENG)
Daniel Rodríguez (ESP)

26 July 2016
12:15

Belgium	2–2	Germany
Freyling 26'; Weyers 54'	Report	Schiffer 28'; Dösch 70'

Umpires:
Gavin Cruickshanks (SCO)
Sean Edwards (ENG)

26 July 2016
16:45

Ireland	11–1	Czech Republic
Nelson 2'; Sarratt 10', 58', 64'; Walker 15'; MacMahon 32'; Crookshanks 33'; Marshall 42', 53'; Empey 60'; Jennings 69'	Report	Urbanec 68'

Umpires:
Daniel Rodríguez (ESP)
Paul van den Assum (NED)

27 July 2016
15:30

Germany	10–0	Czech Republic
Blumensaat 4'; Harms 8', 63'; Knobling 10'; Schiffer 18', 26', 32', 39', 53'; Hartkopf 58'	Report

Umpires:
Vincenzo Ilgrande (ITA)
Daniel Rodríguez (ESP)

27 July 2016
17:45

Ireland	1–3	Belgium
Sarratt 21'	Report	Freyling 28'; Devis 59'; Gougnard 67'

Umpires:
Paul van den Assum (NED)
Sean Edwards (ENG)

==== Pool B ====
Pos	Team	Pld	W	D	L	GF	GA	GD	Pts	Qualification
1	Netherlands	3	2	1	0	19	5	+14	7	Semifinals
2	England	3	2	1	0	12	4	+8	7	Semifinals
3	Spain	3	1	0	2	9	12	−3	3	
4	Italy	3	0	0	3	3	22	−19	0	

Source: EHF
Rules for classification: 1) points; 2) goal difference; 3) goals scored; 4) head-to-head result.

24 July 2016
15:30

Netherlands	2–2	England
De Haan 8'; Dekker 58'	Report	Way 17'; Kimber 31'

Umpires:
Shane O'Donnell (IRE)
Nathan Stenier (BEL)

24 July 2016
17:45

Spain	5–2	Italy
Recasens 41'; Cortés 48'; Tello 63', 70'; Quijano 70'	Report	Malucchi 13'; Lago 46'

Umpires:
Gavin Cruickshanks (SCO)
Tomáš Holek (CZE)

25 July 2016
15:30

England	6–0	Italy
Way 27', 60'; Crowson 46'; Ramshaw 64'; Oates 66'; Kimber 70'	Report

Umpires:
Tomáš Holek (CZE)
Shane O'Donnell (IRE)

25 July 2016
17:45

Spain	2–6	Netherlands
Recasens 21'; Gispert 66'	Report	De Haan 8', 60'; Kuijpers 15'; Van Huiden 33'; Schols 62'; Martens 69'

Umpires:
Nathan Stenier (BEL)
Tim Meissner (GER)

27 July 2016
09:45

Netherlands	11–1	Italy
De Haan 10', 15', 35'; De Vilder 13', 40', 70'; Beins 18', 23', 52'; De Geus 26', 56'	Report	Missaglia 11'

Umpires:
Tim Meissner (GER)
Gavin Cruickshanks (SCO)

27 July 2016
12:00

England	4–2	Spain
Gilmour 23', 47'; Oates 43'; Kimber 53'	Report	Curiel 5'; Álvarez 45'

Umpires:
Shane O'Donnell (IRE)
Tomáš Holek (CZE)

=== Classification round ===
==== Fifth to eighth place classification ====
===== Pool C =====
Pos	Team	Pld	W	D	L	GF	GA	GD	Pts	Relegation
1	Spain	3	3	0	0	16	4	+12	9	
2	Ireland (H)	3	1	1	1	13	8	+5	4	
3	Italy	3	1	1	1	9	8	+1	4	Relegated to 2018 EuroHockey Youth Championship II
4	Czech Republic	3	0	0	3	4	22	−18	0	Relegated to 2018 EuroHockey Youth Championship II

Source: EHF
Rules for classification: 1) points; 2) goal difference; 3) goals scored; 4) head-to-head result.
(H) Hosts

29 July 2016
09:45

Czech Republic	1–5	Italy
Tomes 63'	Report	Lago 14', 51'; Foerster 59'; Malucchi 60'; Paolacci 65'

Umpires:
Sean Edwards (ENG)
Nathan Stenier (BEL)

29 July 2016
12:00

Ireland	0–5	Spain
	Report	Álvarez 9'; Zorita 13', 63'; Tello 17'; Cortés 30'

Umpires:
Tim Meissner (GER)
Gavin Cruickshanks (SCO)

30 July 2016
09:00

Ireland	2–2	Italy
Crookshanks 20'; Nelson 63'	Report	Malucchi 21'; Rubin 53'

Umpires:
Paul van den Assum (NED)
Sean Edwards (ENG)

30 July 2016
11:15

Spain	6–2	Czech Republic
Tello 21', 59'; Cortés 52'; Torras 51', 60'; Recasens 66'	Report	Griebl 33'; Bodnár 56'

Umpires:
Nathan Stenier (BEL)
Tim Meissner (GER)

==== First to fourth place classification ====
Semi-finals
29 July 2016
Germany	5
England	0
29 July 2016
Netherlands (pen.)	3 (4)
Belgium	3 (3)

Final
30 July 2016
Germany	4
Netherlands	3
Third place
30 July 2016
England	2 (1)
Belgium (pen.)	2 (2)

===== Semi-finals =====
29 July 2016
15:30

Netherlands	3–3	Belgium
De Vilder 8'; Schoenaker 51'; De Geus 63'	Report	Sidler 4'; Devis 25'; Gougnard 54'
Penalties
Schoenaker (penalty shoot-out missed); Schols (penalty shoot-out scored); De Geus (penalty shoot-out scored); De Vilder (penalty shoot-out scored); Steenmetser (penalty shoot-out scored)	4–3	(penalty shoot-out missed) Freyling; (penalty shoot-out scored) Caytan; (penalty shoot-out scored) Esquelin; (penalty shoot-out scored) Luyten; (penalty shoot-out missed) DeLavignette

Umpires:
Shane O'Donnell (IRE)
Daniel Rodríguez (ESP)

29 July 2016
18:00

Germany	5–0	England
Knobling 19', 26'; Harms 51'; Hartkopf 62', 63'	Report

Umpires:
Paul van den Assum (NED)
Vincenzo Antonio Ilgrande (ITA)

===== Third and fourth place =====
30 July 2016
12:30

England	2–2	Belgium
Gilmour 10'; Ward 62'	Report	Freyling 15'; Gougnard 39'
Penalties
Gilmour (penalty shoot-out missed); Rogerson (penalty shoot-out scored); Ramshaw (penalty shoot-out missed); Scott (penalty shoot-out missed); Crowson (penalty shoot-out scored)	1–2	(penalty shoot-out scored) Esquelin; (penalty shoot-out missed) Caytan; (penalty shoot-out scored) Sidler; (penalty shoot-out missed) Luyten; (penalty shoot-out missed) DeLavignette

Umpires:
Daniel Rodríguez (ESP)
Tomáš Holek (CZE)

===== Final =====
29 July 2016
17:30

Germany	4–3	Netherlands
Harms 16'; Hartkopf 20', 49'; Schiffer 30'	Report	Schoenaker 24'; De Vilder 59', 70'

Umpires:
Vincenzo Antonio Ilgrande (ITA)
Shane O'Donnell (IRE)

== Statistics ==
=== Final standings ===
As per statistical convention in field hockey, matches decided in extra time are counted as wins and losses, while matches decided by penalty shoot-outs are counted as draws.

Pos	Team	Pld	W	D	L	GF	GA	GD	Pts	Status
1st place, gold medalist(s)	Germany	5	4	1	0	26	5	+21	13	Tournament Champion
2nd place, silver medalist(s)	Netherlands	5	2	2	1	25	12	+13	8	
3rd place, bronze medalist(s)	Belgium	5	2	3	0	18	8	+10	9	
4	England	5	2	2	1	14	11	+3	8	
5	Spain	5	3	0	2	20	14	+6	9	
6	Ireland (H)	5	1	1	3	14	16	−2	4	
7	Italy	5	1	1	3	10	25	−15	4	Relegated to 2018 EuroHockey Youth Championship II
8	Czech Republic	5	0	0	5	4	40	−36	0	Relegated to 2018 EuroHockey Youth Championship II

Source: EHF
(H) Hosts

=== Goalscorers ===
There were 131 goals scored in 20 matches, for an average of 6.55 goals per match.

9 goals

- (Germany) Jan Schiffer

6 goals

- (Netherlands) Daniel de Haan
- (Netherlands) Derck de Vilder

5 goals

- (Belgium) Cyril Freyling
- (Belgium) Boris Gougnard
- (Germany) Raphael Hartkopf
- (Spain) Álvaro Tello

4 goals

- (Germany) Leopold Harms
- (Germany) Eric Knobling
- (Ireland) Guy Sarratt

3 goals

- (England) Euan Gilmour
- (England) Evan Kimber
- (England) Edward Way
- (Italy) Pietro Lago
- (Italy) Matthias Malucchi
- (Netherlands) Teun Beins
- (Netherlands) Jonas de Geus
- (Spain) Sam Cortés
- (Spain) Marc Recasens

2 goals

- (Belgium) Achille de Chaffoy
- (Belgium) Emil Devis
- (Belgium) Loïc Sidler
- (England) James Oates
- (Ireland) Matthew Crookshanks
- (Ireland) Kyle Marshall
- (Ireland) Matthew Nelson
- (Netherlands) Siem Schoenaker
- (Spain) Alejandro Álvarez
- (Spain) Jaume Torras
- (Spain) Enrique Zorita

1 goal

- (Belgium) William Ghislain
- (Belgium) Mathieu Weyers
- (Czech Republic) Kryštof Bodnár
- (Czech Republic) Jakub Griebl
- (Czech Republic) Denis Tomes
- (Czech Republic) Jan Urbanec
- (England) Thomas Crowson
- (England) Matthew Ramshaw
- (England) Lucas Ward
- (Germany) Carl Blumensaat
- (Germany) Fedor Bock
- (Germany) Paul Dösch
- (Germany) Teo Hinrichs
- (Ireland) Conor Empey
- (Ireland) David Jennings
- (Ireland) Harrison MacMahon
- (Ireland) Benjamin Walker
- (Italy) Henry Foerster
- (Italy) Nicola Missaglia
- (Italy) Davide Paolacci
- (Italy) Filippo Rubin
- (Netherlands) Daan Dekker
- (Netherlands) Samuel van Huiden
- (Netherlands) Max Kuijpers
- (Netherlands) Sam Martens
- (Netherlands) Louis Schols
- (Spain) César Curiel
- (Spain) Xavier Gispert
- (Spain) Gonzalo Quijano

Source: EHF
