= Austria men's national field hockey team =

Austria
- Nickname(s): Goldjungs
- Association: Austrian Hockey Federation (Österreichischer Hockeyverband)
- Confederation: EHF (Europe)
- Head Coach: Robin Rösch
- Assistant coach(es): Carsten Alisch; Fabian Unterkircher
- Manager: Benjamin Stanzl
Home	Away

FIH ranking
- Current: 22 (31 August 2026)
- Highest: 18 (July 2018)
- Lowest: 41 (2004)

Olympic Games
- Appearances: 3 (first in 1928)
- Best result: 7th (1952)

EuroHockey Championship
- Appearances: 7 (first in 1970)
- Best result: 7th (2009, 2017, 2023)

The Austria men's national field hockey team represents Austria in men's international field hockey.

Austria mainly competes in the Men's EuroHockey Championship II where they finished second twice. They also have qualified five times for the European championship where they finished seventh in 2009 and 2017. They have never qualified for the World Cup but they have played in three Olympic Games, their last appearance was in 1952.

== Competitive record ==
=== Summer Olympics ===
Summer Olympics record
Year	Host	Position	Pld	W	D	L	GF	GA	Squad
1908	(United Kingdom) London, Great Britain	did not participate							
1920	Antwerp, Belgium	did not participate							
1928	Amsterdam, Netherlands	9th	4	0	0	4	1	14	Squad
1932	Los Angeles, United States	did not participate							
1936	Berlin, Nazi Germany	did not participate							
1948	(United Kingdom) London, Great Britain	8th	3	0	2	1	2	10	Squad
1952	Helsinki, Finland	7th	4	2	0	2	5	7	Squad
1956 to 1988		did not participate							
1992 to 2024		did not qualify							
2028	Los Angeles, United States	to be determined							
2032	Brisbane, Australia	to be determined							
Total		7th place	11	2	2	7	8	31	

=== European Championships ===
EuroHockey Championship record
Year	Host	Position	Pld	W	D	L	GF	GA	Squad
1970	Brussels, Belgium	11th	7	3	1	3	6	9	—N/a
1974	Madrid, Spain	15th	7	2	0	5	10	12	—N/a
1978	Hanover, West Germany	did not qualify							
1983	Amstelveen, Netherlands	11th	7	1	0	6	4	40	—N/a
1987 to 2007		did not qualify							
2009	Amstelveen, Netherlands	7th	5	1	0	4	8	18	Squad
2011 to 2015		did not qualify							
2017	Amstelveen, Netherlands	7th	5	0	3	2	6	15	Squad
2019	Antwerp, Belgium	did not qualify							
2021	Amstelveen, Netherlands	did not qualify							
2023	Mönchengladbach, Germany	7th	5	1	0	4	8	16	Squad
2025	Mönchengladbach, Germany	8th	5	0	0	5	1	33	Squad
2027	London, England	qualified							
Total		7th place	41	8	4	29	43	143	

EuroHockey Championship II record
Year	Host	Position	Pld	W	D	L	GF	GA
2005	Rome, Italy	4th	5	2	0	3	11	13
2007	Lisbon, Portugal	2nd	5	2	2	1	11	10
2009	Wrexham, Wales	played in the Championship I						
2011	Vinnytsia, Ukraine	4th	5	2	1	2	11	12
2013	Vienna, Austria	3rd	5	3	1	1	15	9
2015	Prague, Czech Republic	2nd	5	2	2	1	11	3
2017	Glasgow, Scotland	played in the Championship I						
2019	Cambrai, France	3rd	5	3	2	0	11	4
2021	Gniezno, Poland	1st	5	2	2	1	5	5
2023 to 2025		played in the Championship I						
Total		1st place	35	16	10	9	75	56

=== FIH Hockey Nations Cup ===
Men's FIH Hockey Nations Cup record
Year	Host	Position	Pld	W	D	L	GF	GA
2022	Potchefstroom, South Africa	did not qualify						
2023–24	Gniezno, Poland	8th	6	2	1	3	12	18
2024–25	Kuala Lumpur, Malaysia	did not qualify						
Total		8th place	6	2	1	3	12	18

=== FIH Hockey Nations Cup 2 ===
Men's FIH Hockey Nations Cup 2 record
Year	Host	Position	Pld	W	D	L	GF	GA
2024–25	Muscat, Oman	5th	5	4	0	1	14	9
Total		5th place	5	4	0	1	14	9

=== Hockey World League and FIH Series ===
Hockey World League and FIH Series record
Season	Position	Round	Pld	W	D *	L	GF	GA
2012–13	22nd	Round 1	3	1	1	1	6	6
2012–13	22nd	Round 2	5	1	2	2	14	13
2014–15	19th	Round 1	2	1	1	0	7	2
2014–15	19th	Round 2	6	3	1	2	13	9
2014–15	19th	Semifinal	5	0	1	4	3	17
2016–17	25th	Round 1	3	3	0	0	26	8
2016–17	25th	Round 2	6	3	2	1	19	11
2018–19	—N/a	Open	4	4	0	0	29	3
2018–19	—N/a	Finals	5	2	0	3	10	6
Total	Best: 19th	3rd round	39	18	8	13	127	75

== Players ==
=== Current squad ===
The following 18 players were named on 3 August 2025 for the 2025 Men's EuroHockey Championship in Mönchengladbach, Germany from 8 to 16 August 2025.

Caps updated as of 12 July 2025, after the match against Switzerland.

No.	Pos.	Player	Date of birth (age)	Caps	Club
4	FW	Fülöp Losonci (Captain)	1 March 2002 (age 24)	50	(Germany) Harvestehuder THC
5	MF	Peter Kaltenböck	20 January 1997 (age 29)	48	(Austria) Post SV
6		Arthur Kucera	7 September 2007 (age 18)	9	(Austria) WAC
11	FW	Nikolas Wellan	11 November 2000 (age 25)	52	(Germany) Grossflottbeker THGC
12	FW	Josef Winkler	10 September 2003 (age 22)	38	(Austria) HC Wien
15		Florian Steyrer	22 November 1996 (age 29)	85	(Austria) SV Arminen
16		Maximilian Scholz	28 November 1999 (age 26)	27	(Belgium) Daring
17	MF	Moritz Frey	6 January 2001 (age 25)	31	(Germany) Harvestehuder THC
18		Florian Hackl	18 August 2002 (age 24)	21	(Austria) SV Arminen
19		Maximilian Kelner	7 January 2003 (age 23)	22	(Austria) SV Arminen
25	MF	Bastian Valas	2 November 2000 (age 25)	34	(Belgium) Leuven
27	MF	Benjamin Kölbl	11 May 2002 (age 24)	47	(Germany) Hamburger Polo Club
29	DF	Oliver Kern	10 August 1999 (age 27)	63	(Austria) AHTC
30	DF	Mateusz Nyckowiak	24 January 2004 (age 22)	36	(Austria) Post SV
33	GK	Jakob Kastner	10 January 2000 (age 26)	14	(Austria) Post SV
36		Adrian Fink	13 January 2006 (age 20)	7	(Austria) AHTC
37		Jakob Bauer	18 February 2007 (age 19)	0	(Austria) WAC
41	GK	Laurenzo Rizzi	22 May 1998 (age 28)	11	(Austria) AHTC

=== Recent call-ups ===
The following players have been called up for the national team in the last 12 months.

Pos.	Player	Date of birth (age)	Caps	Club	Latest call-up
MF	Fabian Unterkircher	13 August 1998 (age 28)	78	(Netherlands) Den Bosch	v. Switzerland, 12 July 2025
	Maximilian Meisel	8 October 2006 (age 19)	4	(Germany) UHC Hamburg	v. Switzerland, 12 July 2025
	Finley Meinecke	14 July 2005 (age 21)	2	(Germany) Schwarz-Weiß Köln	v. Switzerland, 12 July 2025
DF	Benjamin Stanzl	13 January 1988 (age 38)	175	(Austria) Post SV	2024–25 FIH Hockey Nations Cup 2
	Christoph Soldat	26 May 1999 (age 27)	25	(Austria) AHTC	2024–25 FIH Hockey Nations Cup 2
	Julian Kaiser	7 November 2007 (age 18)	10	(Austria) HC Wien	2024–25 FIH Hockey Nations Cup 2
GK	Erik Lang	11 March 2005 (age 21)	0	(Austria) AHTC	2024–25 FIH Hockey Nations Cup 2
DF	Xaver Hasun	27 June 1993 (age 33)	143	(Germany) Harvestehuder THC	2025 EuroHockey Championship Qualifier
MF	Leon Thörnblom	3 September 1995 (age 30)	103	(Germany) Hamburger Polo Club	2025 EuroHockey Championship Qualifier
FW	Franz Lindengrün	26 September 1995 (age 30)	63	(Austria) HC Wien	2025 EuroHockey Championship Qualifier
MF	Moritz Zotter	14 August 2006 (age 20)	10	(Germany) UHC Hamburg	v. Wales, 11 August 2024

== Results and fixtures ==
The following is a list of match results in the last 12 months, as well as any future matches that have been scheduled.

Win Draw Loss Fixture

=== 2026 ===
==== 2026 Men's FIH Hockey World Cup Qualifiers ====
01 March 2026 Pool B	Malaysia	6–1	Austria	Ismailia, Egypt
13:00	Azrai 24', 44'; Silverius 24'; Sumantri 34'; Anuar 52'; Jalil 57'	Report	Losonci 3'	Stadium: Suez Canal Stadium

02 March 2026 Pool B	Austria	1–1	China	Ismailia, Egypt
15:00	Frey 27'	Report	Chen 31'	Stadium: Suez Canal Stadium

04 March 2026 Pool B	Austria	2–4	Pakistan	Ismailia, Egypt
13:00	Kelner 47'; Scholz 53'	Report	Afraz 4'; Mahmood 44', 52'; Khan 51'	Stadium: Suez Canal Stadium

06 March 2026 5/8 Classification	Egypt	4–0	Austria	Ismailia, Egypt
11:00	El-Ganaini 9'; Awad 25'; Mamdouh 47'; Adel 53'	Report		Stadium: Suez Canal Stadium

07 March 2026 7/8 Classification	Austria	Walkover (Note: The United States withdrew after two matches because of an official advisory from the US State Department due to the 2026 Iran War. Matches played stood and all other matches were cancelled and resulted in favour of the opposing team.)	United States	Ismailia, Egypt
09:00		Report		Stadium: Suez Canal Stadium

== See also ==
- Austria women's national field hockey team
