= 2019 Men's Under-21 Eight Nations Hockey Tournament =

2019 Men's Eight Nations Invitational Tournament
Tournament details
- Host country: Spain
- Dates: 10–16 June
- Teams: 8 (from 3 confederations)
- Venue: 2 (in 1 host city)

Final positions
- Champions: Germany
- Runner-up: Spain
- Third place: Belgium

Tournament statistics
- Matches played: 20
- Goals scored: 97 (4.85 per match)
- Top scorer: (Belgium) Emile Esquelin (6 goals)

The 2019 Men's Under-21 Eight Nations Hockey Tournament was an invitational men's under-21 field hockey tournament, organised by the Real Federación Española de Hockey. The tournament took place from 10 to 16 June 2019 in Madrid, Spain. It was held at the Federación Madrileña de Hockey and Club de Campo.

Germany won the tournament, defeating Spain 2–1 in the final. Belgium finished in third place after defeating Australia 4–3 in penalties following a 2–2 draw.

== Teams ==
The tournament featured teams from three confederations:

- Australia
- Austria
- Belgium
- Germany
- Great Britain
- India
- Netherlands
- Spain

== Results ==
=== Preliminary round ===
==== Pool A ====
Pos	Team	Pld	W	D	L	GF	GA	GD	Pts	Qualification
1	Germany	3	3	0	0	15	4	+11	9	Semi-finals
2	Belgium	3	2	0	1	12	6	+6	6	Semi-finals
3	Austria	3	1	0	2	3	10	−7	3	
4	Great Britain	3	0	0	3	3	13	−10	0	

Source: FIH
Rules for classification: 1) points; 2) goal difference; 3) goals scored; 4) head-to-head result.

10 June 2019
10:00

Great Britain	2–5	Belgium
Ramshaw 36'; Griffiths 60'	Report	Muschs 6'; Esquelin 10', 49'; Biekens 26'; Weyers 34'

Club de Campo, Madrid
Umpires:
Daniel Rodríguez (ESP)
Raphael Adrien (GER)

10 June 2019
12:00

Germany	5–1	Austria
Siegburg 9'; Hartkopf 39'; Weigand 42'; Dösch 47'; H. Müller 54'	Report	Schippan 45'

Club de Campo, Madrid
Umpires:
Rajput Sourabh (IND)
Daniel Veerman (NED)

11 June 2019
10:00

Great Britain	0–1	Austria
	Report	Loser 6'

Somontes, Madrid
Umpires:
Sébastien Michielsen (BEL)
James Unkles (AUS)

11 June 2019
12:00

Belgium	2–3	Germany
Stockbroekx 6'; De Chaffoy 27'	Report	Schiffer 28'; Dösch 34'; H. Müller 39'

Somontes, Madrid
Umpires:
Luka Zupančič (AUT)
Robert Abbott (IRE)

13 June 2019
10:00

Belgium	5–1	Austria
Esquelin 12', 36'; Weyers 40'; De Chaffoy 55'; Duvekot 57'	Report	Soldat 27'

Club de Campo, Madrid
Umpires:
Harrison Collinson (ENG)
Rajput Sourabh (IND)

13 June 2019
12:00

Germany	7–1	Great Britain
Weigand 11', 39'; Schellinger 17'; Dösch 20'; L. Müller 48'; Schwarzhaupt 54'; Hartkopf 60'	Report	Ramshaw 42'

Club de Campo, Madrid
Umpires:
Daniel Veerman (NED)
Daniel Rodríguez (ESP)

==== Pool B ====
Pos	Team	Pld	W	D	L	GF	GA	GD	Pts	Qualification
1	Spain (H)	3	3	0	0	13	3	+10	9	Semi-finals
2	Australia	3	1	1	1	6	4	+2	4	Semi-finals
3	Netherlands	3	1	1	1	5	10	−5	4	
4	India	3	0	0	3	3	10	−7	0	

Source: FIH
Rules for classification: 1) points; 2) goal difference; 3) goals scored; 4) head-to-head result.
(H) Hosts

10 June 2019
14:00

Australia	4–0	India
Ephraums 25', 44'; Hart 53'; Hazell 60'	Report

Club de Campo, Madrid
Umpires:
Sébastien Michielsen (BEL)
Luka Zupančič (AUT)

10 June 2019
16:00

Netherlands	1–7	Spain
Scheen 27'	Report	Cobos 5', 5'; Figa 19'; Recasens 28'; Curiel 31'; Tello 55'; Vall 58'

Club de Campo, Madrid
Umpires:
James Unkles (AUS)
Robert Abbott (IRE)

11 June 2019
14:00

Netherlands	3–2	India
Van de Venne 5', 26'; De Vilder 32'	Report	Vishnukant 23'; Sudeep 37'

Somontes, Madrid
Umpires:
Harrison Collinson (ENG)
Daniel Rodríguez (ESP)

11 June 2019
16:00

Spain	3–1	Australia
Zorita 22', 35'; Cobos 48'	Report	Brown 27'

Somontes, Madrid
Umpires:
Daniel Veerman (NED)
Raphael Adrien (GER)

13 June 2019
14:00

Australia	1–1	Netherlands
Ephraums 17'	Report	Hoedemakers 23'

Club de Campo, Madrid
Umpires:
Robert Abbott (IRE)
Sébastien Michielsen (BEL)

13 June 2019
16:00

Spain	3–1	India
Cobos 35'; Curiel 37'; Quijano 39'	Report	Pratap 31'

Club de Campo, Madrid
Umpires:
Raphael Adrien (GER)
James Unkles (AUS)

=== Classification round ===
==== Fifth to eighth place classification ====
Crossover
15 June
Austria	2
India	4
15 June
Netherlands	0 (2)
Great Britain (pen.)	0 (3)

Fifth place
16 June
India	1
Great Britain	2
Seventh place
16 June
Austria	0
Netherlands	11

===== Crossover =====
15 June 2019
11:45

Austria	2–4	India
Kern 34'; Schippan 49'	Report	Sanjay 15', 23'; Rahul 35'; Prabhjot 51'

Somontes, Madrid
Umpires:
Daniel Rodríguez (ESP)
Harrison Collinson (ENG)

15 June 2019
14:00

Netherlands	0–0	Great Britain
	Report
Penalties
Middendorp (penalty shoot-out missed); Tukkers (penalty shoot-out missed); De Vilder (penalty shoot-out scored); Schoenaker (penalty shoot-out scored); Bijen (penalty shoot-out missed)	2–3	(penalty shoot-out missed) Griffiths; (penalty shoot-out scored) Park; (penalty shoot-out scored) Gravestock; (penalty shoot-out missed) West; (penalty shoot-out scored) Ramshaw

Somontes, Madrid
Umpires:
James Unkles (AUS)
Luka Zupančič (AUT)

===== Seventh and eighth place =====
16 June 2019
17:45

Austria	0–11	Netherlands
	Report	De Haan 13'; Hoedemakers 18', 42'; Van de Venne 22', 39', 53'; Klinkhamer 38'; De Vilder 43'; Schoenaker 45'; Bijen 55'; Scheen 60'

Club de Campo, Madrid
Umpires:
Harrison Collinson (ENG)
Rajput Sourabh (IND)

===== Fifth and sixth place =====
16 June 2019
15:30

India	1–2	Great Britain
Maninder 15'	Report	West 29'; McConnell 37'

Club de Campo, Madrid
Umpires:
Luka Zupančič (AUT)
Daniel Veerman (NED)

==== First to fourth place classification ====
Semi-finals
15 June
Germany	3
Australia	2
15 June
Spain	3
Belgium	2

Final
16 June
Germany	2
Spain	1
Third place
16 June
Australia	2 (3)
Belgium (pen.)	2 (4)

===== Semi-finals =====
15 June 2019
12:15

Germany	3–2	Australia
Weigand 12'; Schiffer 25'; Prinz 44'	Report	Hazell 2'; Harvie 47'

Somontes, Madrid
Umpires:
Rajput Sourabh (IND)
Sébastien Michielsen (BEL)

15 June 2019
14:30

Spain	3–2	Belgium
Zorita 11'; Quijano 15'; Recasens 18'	Report	Esquelin 17', 25'

Somontes, Madrid
Umpires:
Daniel Veerman (NED)
Robert Abbott (IRE)

===== Third and fourth place =====
16 June 2019
15:30

Australia	2–2	Belgium
Francis 29', 45'	Report	Weyers 14'; Englebert 35'
Penalties
Hazell (penalty shoot-out scored); Ephraums (penalty shoot-out scored); Francis (penalty shoot-out missed); Hendry (penalty shoot-out scored); Bretherton (penalty shoot-out missed)	3–4	(penalty shoot-out scored) Esquelin; (penalty shoot-out missed) Delavignette; (penalty shoot-out scored) Ghislain; (penalty shoot-out scored) Van Oost; (penalty shoot-out scored) Stockbroekx

Club de Campo, Madrid
Umpires:
Raphael Adrien (GER)
Daniel Rodríguez (AUS)

===== Final =====
16 June 2019
17:45

Germany	2–1	Spain
Weigand 17'; Hartkopf 59'	Report	Cobos 60'

Club de Campo, Madrid
Umpires:
Sébastien Michielsen (BEL)
James Unkles (AUS)

== Statistics ==
=== Final standings ===
As per statistical convention in field hockey, matches decided in extra time are counted as wins and losses, while matches decided by penalty shoot-outs are counted as draws.

Pos	Team	Pld	W	D	L	GF	GA	GD	Pts	Final result
1st place, gold medalist(s)	Germany	5	5	0	0	20	7	+13	15	Gold medal
2nd place, silver medalist(s)	Spain (H)	5	4	0	1	17	7	+10	12	Silver medal
3rd place, bronze medalist(s)	Belgium	5	2	1	2	16	11	+5	7	Bronze medal
4	Australia	5	1	2	2	10	9	+1	5	
5	Great Britain	5	1	1	3	5	14	−9	4	
6	India	5	1	0	4	8	14	−6	3	
7	Netherlands	5	2	2	1	16	10	+6	8	
8	Austria	5	1	0	4	5	25	−20	3	

Source: FIH
(H) Hosts

=== Goalscorers ===
There were 97 goals scored in 20 matches, for an average of 4.85 goals per match.

6 goals

- (Belgium) Emile Esquelin

5 goals

- (Germany) Justus Weigand
- (Netherlands) Jim van de Venne
- (Spain) Ignacio Cobos

3 goals

- (Australia) Nathan Ephraums
- (Belgium) Mathieu Weyers
- (Germany) Paul Dösch
- (Germany) Raphael Hartkopf
- (Netherlands) Tjep Hoedemakers
- (Spain) Enrique Zorita

2 goals

- (Australia) Michael Francis
- (Australia) Ehren Hazell
- (Austria) Phillip Schippan
- (Belgium) Achille de Chaffoy
- (Germany) Hannes Müller
- (Germany) Jan Schiffer
- (United Kingdom) Matthew Ramshaw
- (India) Sanjay
- (Netherlands) Pepijn Scheen
- (Netherlands) Derck de Vilder
- (Spain) César Curiel
- (Spain) Gonzalo Quijano
- (Spain) Marc Recasens

1 goal

- (Australia) Thomas Brown
- (Australia) Liam Hart
- (Australia) Thomas Harvie
- (Austria) Oliver Kern
- (Austria) Lucas Loser
- (Austria) Christoph Soldat
- (Belgium) Olivier Biekens
- (Belgium) Roman Duvekot
- (Belgium) Dylan Englebert
- (Belgium) Max Muschs
- (Belgium) Thibeau Stockbroekx
- (Germany) Linus Müller
- (Germany) Thies Prinz
- (Germany) Christian Schellinger
- (Germany) Benedikt Schwarzhaupt
- (Germany) Maximilian Siegburg
- (United Kingdom) Gareth Griffths
- (United Kingdom) Andrew McConnell
- (United Kingdom) Daniel West
- (India) Sudeep Chirmako
- (India) Pratap Lakra
- (India) Rahul Kumar Rajhbar
- (India) Maninder Singh
- (India) Prabhjot Singh
- (India) Vishnukant Singh
- (Netherlands) Koen Bijen
- (Netherlands) Daniel de Haan
- (Netherlands) Ties Klinkhamer
- (Netherlands) Siem Schoenaker
- (Spain) Roger Figa
- (Spain) Álvaro Tello
- (Spain) Jan Vall

Source: FIH
