= Dewi Roblin =

Welsh field hockey player

Personal information
- Born: 10 February 1994 (age 32) Wales

Sport
- Sport: Field hockey
- Position: Goalkeeper
Senior career
Years	Team	Caps	Goals
2012–2015	Birmingham Univ	-	-
2016–2021	Southgate	-	-
2021–2023	Hampstead & Westminster	-	-
2023–2026	Surbiton	-	-
National team
Years	Team	Caps	Goals
2015–	Wales		-

Dewi Roblin (born 10 February 1994) is a Welsh field hockey player who has represented Wales. He competed for Wales at the 2022 Commonwealth Games.

== Biography ==
Roblin played for the Wales U16 team. He made his Welsh debut against Austria in 2015, when at University playing for the University of Birmingham Hockey Club. Roblin studied Mathematics at the University of Birmingham and then studied to become a chartered accountant.

After University he played club hockey for Southgate Hockey Club in the Men's England Hockey League, where he continued to represent his nation as the team's goalkeeper.

He signed for Hampstead & Westminster Hockey Club for the 2021–22 season and while at the club was selected to represent Wales at the 2022 Commonwealth Games in Birmingham, helping his nation to a sixth place finish during the men's tournament after being defeated by New Zealand in the fifth place play off match on 7 August 2022.

In 2023, Roblin was part of the Welsh team that played at the 2023 Men's EuroHockey Championship. and joined Surbiton Hockey Club for the 2023/24 season.
