= Derck de Vilder =

Dutch field hockey player

Personal information
- Born: 23 November 1998 (age 27) Amsterdam, Netherlands

Sport
- Sport: Field hockey
- Position: Defender / Midfielder
Youth career
- Team
- –: Pinoké
Senior career
Years	Team	Caps	Goals
2016–2018	Pinoké	-	-
2018–present	Kampong	-	-
National team
Years	Team	Caps	Goals
2017–2019	Netherlands U21	16	(2)
2018–present	Netherlands	13	(1)
Medal record
Men's field hockey
Representing the Netherlands
Olympic Games
Gold medal – first place	2024 Paris	Team
World Cup
Bronze medal – third place	2023 Bhubaneswar/Rourkela
EuroHockey Championship
Gold medal – first place	2023 Mönchengladbach
Silver medal – second place	2025 Mönchengladbach
EuroHockey Junior Championship
Gold medal – first place	2017 Valencia
Bronze medal – third place	2019 Valencia

Derck de Vilder (born 23 November 1998) is a Dutch professional field hockey player who plays as a defender or midfielder for Hoofdklasse club Kampong and the Dutch national team.

== Career ==
=== Club hockey ===
In the Dutch Hoofdklasse, De Vilder plays for SV Kampong.

=== National teams ===
==== Under–21 ====
De Vilder made his debut for the Netherlands U–21 team in 2017 during a test series against Germany in Mönchengladbach. Later that year he won a gold medal with the team at the EuroHockey Junior Championship in Valencia, Spain.

In 2019, two years after his debut, De Vilder returned to the junior national team during an eight-nations tournament in Madrid. He went on to represent the team at another EuroHockey Junior Championship later that year, on this occasion winning a bronze medal.

==== Oranje ====
Derck de Vilder made his senior debut for the Oranje in 2018 during a test series against Australia in Perth.

He has since gone on to make a number of appearances for the national team, before being named in the official squad for the first time in 2022.
