= Matthew Ramshaw =

English field hockey player

Personal information
- Born: 29 December 1999 (age 26) Airedale, England

Sport
- Sport: Field hockey
- Position: Forward
Senior career
Years	Team	Caps	Goals
–	Southgate	-	-
2024–2026	Holcombe	-	-
National team
Years	Team	Caps	Goals
2018–2019	Great Britain U–21	17	(4)
2019	England U–21	4	(0)
2022–	England	5	(2)
Medal record
Men's field hockey
Representing England
EuroHockey Junior Championship
Silver medal – second place	2019 Valencia	Team
Representing United Kingdom
Sultan of Johor Cup
Gold medal – first place	2018 Johor Bahru	Team
Gold medal – first place	2019 Johor Bahru	Team

Matthew Ramshaw (born 29 December 1999) is a field hockey player from England, who plays as a forward.

== Personal life ==
Matthew Ramshaw was born and raised in Airedale.

== Career ==
=== National teams ===
Ramshaw has represented both England and Great Britain at international levels.

==== Under–21 ====
Ramshaw made his debut for the Great Britain U–21 team in 2018 at the Sultan of Johor Cup in Johor Bahru.

In 2019, he represented the team again at an eight–nations tournament in Madrid. He followed this up with his second Sultan of Johor Cup gold medal. Ramshaw also represented England in his junior career, winning a silver medal at the 2019 EuroHockey Junior Championship in Valencia.

==== England ====
Ramshaw made his senior international debut in 2022 during season three of the FIH Pro League. He scored twice in his debut match against France.
