= Justen Blok =

Dutch field hockey player

Personal information
- Born: 27 September 2000 (age 25)
- Height: 1.95 m (6 ft 5 in)

Sport
- Sport: Field hockey
- Position: Defender
- Club: Rotterdam
Youth career
- Team
- –: Ring Pass
- –: Rotterdam
Senior career
Years	Team	Caps	Goals
–	Rotterdam	-	-
National team
Years	Team	Caps	Goals
2019–present	Netherlands	11	(0)
Medal record
Men's field hockey
Representing the Netherlands
Olympic Games
Gold medal – first place	2024 Paris	Team
World Cup
Bronze medal – third place	2023 Bhubaneswar/Rourkela
EuroHockey Championship
Gold medal – first place	2021 Amstelveen
Gold medal – first place	2023 Mönchengladbach
Silver medal – second place	2025 Mönchengladbach

Justen Blok (born 27 September 2000) is a Dutch professional field hockey player who plays as a defender for Rotterdam and the Dutch national team.

== International career ==
He made his debut for the national team in early 2019. He competed at the 2021 Men's EuroHockey Nations Championship.
