= 2023 Men's EuroHockey Championship =

Field hockey championship

Tournament details
- Host country: Germany
- City: Mönchengladbach
- Dates: 19–27 August
- Teams: 8 (from 1 confederation)
- Venue: Warsteiner HockeyPark

Final positions
- Champions: Netherlands (7th title)
- Runner-up: England
- Third place: Belgium

Tournament statistics
- Matches played: 20
- Goals scored: 96 (4.8 per match)
- Top scorer: (Netherlands) Duco Telgenkamp (6 goals)
- Best player: (Germany) Teo Hinrichs
- Best young player: (Netherlands) Duco Telgenkamp
- Best goalkeeper: (Germany) Jean Danneberg

The 2023 Men's EuroHockey Championship was the nineteenth edition of the Men's EuroHockey Championship, the biennial international men's field hockey championship of Europe organised by the European Hockey Federation.

The tournament was held alongside the women's tournament from 19 to 27 August 2023 at the Warsteiner HockeyPark, in Mönchengladbach, Germany.

The Netherlands, as the winner, qualified for the 2024 Summer Olympics, while the other teams aside from Wales and France will have a second chance in the 2024 Men's FIH Hockey Olympic Qualifiers. The six best teams qualified directly for the 2025 edition, while the seventh and eighth place teams will play in the 2024 EuroHockey Championship qualifiers. In the final the Netherlands defeated England to capture their seventh title.

== Qualification ==
Along with the host nation Germany, the top three teams at the 2021 EuroHockey Championship and the four winners of the 2022 EuroHockey Championship Qualifiers fielded the men's tournament.

Qualification	Date	Host	Berths	Qualified team
Host nation	14 December 2020	—N/a	1	Germany
2021 EuroHockey Championship	4–12 June 2021	(Netherlands) Amstelveen	3	Netherlands; Belgium; England
EuroHockey Championship Qualifiers	17–20 August 2022	(Spain) Ourense	1	Spain
EuroHockey Championship Qualifiers	23–26 August 2022	(Austria) Vienna	1	Austria
EuroHockey Championship Qualifiers	24–27 August 2022	(France) Calais	1	France
EuroHockey Championship Qualifiers	24–27 August 2022	(Scotland) Glasgow	1	Wales
Total			8	

== Preliminary round ==
All times are local (UTC+2).

=== Pool A ===
Pos	Team	Pld	W	D	L	GF	GA	GD	Pts	Qualification
1	Belgium	3	3	0	0	13	5	+8	9	Semi-finals
2	England	3	2	0	1	10	8	+2	6	Semi-finals
3	Spain	3	1	0	2	9	9	0	3	
4	Austria	3	0	0	3	1	11	−10	0	

Source: FIH
Rules for classification: 1) points; 2) matches won; 3) goal difference; 4) goals for; 5) head-to-head result; 6) field goals for.

20 August 2023
10:15

Spain	5–0	Austria
González 24'; Miralles 26'; Vilallonga 27'; Menini 33'; Basterra 45'	Report

Umpires:
Michael Dutrieux (BEL)
Martin Madden (SCO)

20 August 2023
12:30

England	3–5	Belgium
Bandurak 8', 26'; Ward 30'	Report	Ghislain 12'; Van Aubel 31', 32'; Luypaert 40'; Hendrickx 41'

Umpires:
Erica Porter (IRE)
Ben Göntgen (GER)

21 August 2023
13:15

England	3–0	Austria
Oates 36'; Albery 49'; Bandurak 57'	Report

Umpires:
Laurine Delforge (BEL)
Antonio Ilgrande (ITA)

21 August 2023
20:30

Belgium	5–1	Spain
Ghislain 11'; Hendrickx 13', 48'; Van Aubel 18'; Onana 50'	Report	Basterra 42'

Umpires:
Sean Edwards (ENG)
Jonas van 't Hek (NED)

23 August 2023
10:00

Belgium	3–1	Austria
Hendrickx 5', 15'; Onana 25'	Report	Losonci 25'

Umpires:
Martin Madden (SCO)
Alison Keogh (IRE)

23 August 2023
12:15

Spain	3–4	England
Gispert 12'; Basterra 35'; Miralles 40'	Report	Bandurak 28'; Gall 37'; Ward 40'; Sorsby 40'

Umpires:
Jakub Mejzlík (CZE)
Ben Göntgen (GER)

=== Pool B ===
Pos	Team	Pld	W	D	L	GF	GA	GD	Pts	Qualification
1	Germany (H)	3	2	1	0	10	4	+6	7	Semi-finals
2	Netherlands	3	2	0	1	14	4	+10	6	Semi-finals
3	France	3	1	0	2	3	10	−7	3	
4	Wales	3	0	1	2	4	13	−9	1	

Source: FIH
Rules for classification: 1) points; 2) matches won; 3) goal difference; 4) goals for; 5) head-to-head result; 6) field goals for.
(H) Hosts

19 August 2023
15:30

Netherlands	6–0	France
Pieters 18', 26'; Telgenkamp 23', 33'; Bijen 49', 50'	Report

Umpires:
Michael Gholami-Eilmer (AUT)
Sarah Wilson (SCO)

19 August 2023
18:00

Germany	3–3	Wales
Hellwig 25'; Windfeder 35'; T. Grambusch 45'	Report	Pritchard 42', 58'; G. Furlong 49'

Umpires:
Sean Edwards (ENG)
Rachel Williams (ENG)

21 August 2023
15:30

France	2–0	Wales
Lockwood 33', 57'	Report

Umpires:
Jakub Mejzlík (CZE)
Coen van Bunge (NED)

21 August 2023
18:00

Germany	3–0	Netherlands
Weigand 2'; Wellen 5'; Hellwig 28'	Report

Umpires:
Dan Barstow (ENG)
Martin Madden (SCO)

23 August 2023
17:15

Netherlands	8–1	Wales
Telgenkamp 6', 7'; Bijen 25', 47'; Pieters 32'; Van Dam 43'; Croon 46'; Brinkman 49'	Report	Kelly 20'

Umpires:
Antonio Ilgrande (ITA)
Céline Martin-Schmets (BEL)

23 August 2023
19:30

France	1–4	Germany
Masson 26'	Report	M. Grambusch 24'; Windfeder 31'; Peillat 39'; Prinz 42'

Umpires:
Sean Edwards (ENG)
Jonas van 't Hek (NED)

== Fifth to eighth place classification ==
The points obtained in the preliminary round against the other team were carried over.

Pos	Team	Pld	W	D	L	GF	GA	GD	Pts
5	France	3	3	0	0	8	4	+4	9
6	Spain	3	2	0	1	10	5	+5	6
7	Austria	3	1	0	2	7	10	−3	3
8	Wales	3	0	0	3	4	10	−6	0

Source: FIH
Rules for classification: 1) points; 2) matches won; 3) goal difference; 4) goals for; 5) head-to-head result; 6) field goals for.

25 August 2023
11:30

Austria	4–1	Wales
Kaltenböck 8'; Winkler 22'; Unterkircher 32'; Bele 52'	Report	G. Furlong 9'

Umpires:
Jonas van 't Hek (NED)
Michael Dutrieux (BEL)

25 August 2023
14:30

Spain	1–2	France
Iglesias 32'	Report	Martin-Brisac 2'; Goyet 59'

Umpires:
Martin Madden (SCO)
Jakub Mejzlík (CZE)

26 August 2023
18:15

Spain	4–3	Wales
Basterra 34'; Pa. Cunill 39', 60'; Menini 43'	Report	G. Furlong 32', 58'; Hutchinson 57'

Umpires:
Coen van Bunge (NED)
Michael Gholami-Eilmer (AUT)

27 August 2023
10:00

France	4–3	Austria
Tynevez 14', 20', 47'; Martin-Brisac 40'	Report	Körper 5', 23'; Thörnblom 18'

Umpires:
Michael Dutrieux (BEL)
Laurine Delforge (BEL)

== First to fourth place classification ==
=== Bracket ===
Semi-finals
25 August
Belgium	2
Netherlands	3
25 August
Germany	0 (4)
England (p.s.o.)	0 (5)

Final
27 August
Netherlands	2
England	1
Third place
27 August
Belgium	2
Germany	0

=== Semi-finals ===
25 August 2023
19:00

Belgium	2–3	Netherlands
Denayer 2'; Van Aubel 40'	Report	De Geus 34'; Brinkman 38'; Telgenkamp 57'

Umpires:
Ben Göntgen (GER)
Dan Barstow (ENG)

25 August 2023
21:15

Germany	0–0	England
	Report
Penalties
Wellen (penalty shoot-out scored); H. Müller (penalty shoot-out scored); Prinz (penalty shoot-out scored); Große (penalty shoot-out scored); M. Grambusch (penalty shoot-out missed)	4–5	(penalty shoot-out scored) Albery; (penalty shoot-out scored) Wallace; (penalty shoot-out scored) Williamson; (penalty shoot-out scored) Roper; (penalty shoot-out scored) Ames

Umpires:
Coen van Bunge (NED)
Sarah Wilson (SCO)

=== Third and fourth place ===
27 August 2023
12:30

Belgium	2–0	Germany
Onana 15'; Van Aubel 29'	Report

Umpires:
Sean Edwards (ENG)
Dan Barstow (ENG)

=== Final ===
27 August 2023
15:00

Netherlands	2–1	England
De Vilder 9'; Telgenkamp 37'	Report	Ward 47'

Umpires:
Ben Göntgen (GER)
Sarah Wilson (SCO)

== Statistics and awards ==
=== Final standings ===
Pos	Team	Qualification
1st place, gold medalist(s)	Netherlands	2024 Summer Olympics
2nd place, silver medalist(s)	England	2024 FIH Hockey Olympic Qualifiers
3rd place, bronze medalist(s)	Belgium	2024 FIH Hockey Olympic Qualifiers
4	Germany (H)	2024 FIH Hockey Olympic Qualifiers
5	France (Note: France is already qualified for the Olympics as the host nation.)	
6	Spain	2024 FIH Hockey Olympic Qualifiers
7	Austria	2024 FIH Hockey Olympic Qualifiers
8	Wales (Note: Wales is not eligible for the Olympics.)	

Source: FIH
(H) Host

=== Goalscorers ===
There were 96 goals scored in 20 matches, for an average of 4.8 goals per match.

6 goals

- (Netherlands) Duco Telgenkamp

5 goals

- (Belgium) Florent Van Aubel
- (Belgium) Alexander Hendrickx

4 goals

- (England) Nick Bandurak
- (Netherlands) Koen Bijen
- (Spain) José Basterra
- (Wales) Gareth Furlong

3 goals

- (Belgium) Nelson Onana
- (England) Samuel Ward
- (France) Etienne Tynevez
- (Netherlands) Terrance Pieters

2 goals

- (Austria) Michael Körper
- (Belgium) William Ghislain
- (France) Simon Martin-Brisac
- (France) Viktor Lockwood
- (Germany) Malte Hellwig
- (Germany) Lukas Windfeder
- (Spain) Pau Cunill
- (Spain) Joaquín Menini
- (Spain) Marc Miralles
- (Wales) Jack Pritchard

1 goal

- (Austria) Alexander Bele
- (Austria) Fülöp Losonci
- (Austria) Peter Kaltenböck
- (Austria) Leon Thörnblom
- (Austria) Fabian Unterkircher
- (Austria) Josef Winkler
- (Belgium) Félix Denayer
- (Belgium) Loïck Luypaert
- (England) James Albery
- (England) James Gall
- (England) James Oates
- (England) Tom Sorsby
- (France) François Goyet
- (France) Charles Masson
- (Germany) Mats Grambusch
- (Germany) Tom Grambusch
- (Germany) Gonzalo Peillat
- (Germany) Thies Prinz
- (Germany) Justus Weigand
- (Germany) Niklas Wellen
- (Netherlands) Justen Blok
- (Netherlands) Thierry Brinkman
- (Netherlands) Jorrit Croon
- (Netherlands) Thijs van Dam
- (Netherlands) Jonas de Geus
- (Netherlands) Derck de Vilder
- (Spain) Xavier Gispert
- (Spain) Enrique González
- (Spain) Álvaro Iglesias
- (Spain) Rafael Vilallonga
- (Wales) Dale Hutchinson
- (Wales) Stephen Kelly

Source: FIH

=== Awards ===
The following awards were given at the conclusion of the tournament.

Award	Player
Player of the tournament	(Germany) Teo Hinrichs
Top goalscorer	(Netherlands) Duco Telgenkamp
Goalkeeper of the tournament	(Germany) Jean Danneberg
Young player of the tournament	(Netherlands) Duco Telgenkamp

== See also ==
- 2023 Men's EuroHockey Championship II
- 2023 Women's EuroHockey Championship
