= 2019 Men's EuroHockey Junior Championship =

Hockey tournament

Tournament details
- Host country: Spain
- City: Valencia
- Dates: 15–21 July
- Teams: 8 (from 1 confederation)
- Venue: Estadio Betero

Final positions
- Champions: Germany (6th title)
- Runner-up: England
- Third place: Netherlands

Tournament statistics
- Matches played: 20
- Goals scored: 107 (5.35 per match)
- Top scorer: (Germany) Raphael Hartkopf (8 goals)

The 2019 Men's EuroHockey Junior Championship was the 19th edition of the men's EuroHockey Junior Championship, the biennial international men's under-21 field hockey championship of Europe organised by the European Hockey Federation. It was held alongside the women's tournament in Valencia, Spain from 15 to 21 July 2019.

This tournament served as the European qualifier for the 2021 FIH Junior World Cup, with the top six teams qualifying.

Germany won the tournament for the sixth time by defeating England 5–3 in the final. The defending champions, the Netherlands won the bronze model by defeating the hosts Spain 3–1.

== Qualified teams ==
The following eighth team qualified based on their final positions in the 2017 EuroHockey Junior Championships.

Dates	Event	Location	Quotas	Qualifiers
28 August – 3 September 2017	2017 EuroHockey Junior Championship	Valencia, Spain	6	Netherlands; Belgium; Germany; Spain; England; Austria
16–22 July 2017	2017 EuroHockey Junior Championship II	Saint Petersburg, Russia	2	France; Poland
Total			8	

== Results ==
All times are local, CEST (UTC+2).

=== Preliminary round ===
==== Pool A ====
Pos	Team	Pld	W	D	L	GF	GA	GD	Pts	Qualification
1	Spain (H)	3	2	1	0	7	2	+5	7	Semi-finals and 2021 FIH Junior World Cup
2	England	3	1	2	0	8	4	+4	5	Semi-finals and 2021 FIH Junior World Cup
3	Belgium	3	1	1	1	7	3	+4	4	Pool C
4	Poland	3	0	0	3	3	18	−15	0	Pool C

Source: FIH
(H) Hosts

15 July 2019
17:45

England	6–2	Poland
Rushmere 5'; Wallace 28', 54'; Griffiths 32'; Way 42', 52'	Report	E. Bembenek 48'; Kurowski 59'

Umpires:
Daniel Rodriguez (ESP)
Luka Zupancic (AUT)

15 July 2019
20:00

Belgium	0–2	Spain
	Report	Cobos 27'; Alonso 40'

Umpires:
Alex Fedenczuk (SCO)
Johannes Berneth (GER)

16 July 2019
20:00

Spain	6–1	Poland
Zorita 5', 12', 13'; Cobos 5'; Reyné 18'; Tello 35'	Report	E. Bembenek 4'

Umpires:
Antoine Duhem (FRA)
Luka Zupancic (AUT)

16 July 2019
20:00

England	1–1	Belgium
Wallace 43'	Report	Englebert 25'

Umpires:
Shane O'Donnell (IRL)
Daniel Veerman (NED)

18 July 2019
09:00

Belgium	6–0	Poland
T. Biekens 14'; Delavignette 15'; Esquelin 31', 38'; Stockbroekx 36'; Muschs 52'	Report

Umpires:
Shane O'Donnell (IRL)
Antoine Duhem (FRA)

18 July 2019
20:00

Spain	1–1	England
Zorita 59'	Report	Way 40'

Umpires:
Alex Fedenczuk (SCO)
Johannes Berneth (GER)

==== Pool B ====
Pos	Team	Pld	W	D	L	GF	GA	GD	Pts	Qualification
1	Netherlands	3	2	1	0	12	1	+11	7	Semi-finals and 2021 FIH Junior World Cup
2	Germany	3	2	0	1	19	5	+14	6	Semi-finals and 2021 FIH Junior World Cup
3	France	3	1	1	1	7	10	−3	4	Pool C
4	Austria	3	0	0	3	3	25	−22	0	Pool C

Source: FIH

15 July 2019
11:15

Germany	9–1	France
Dösch 17'; Prinz 21'; Weigand 39', 45', 49'; Hinrichs 41'; Schiffer 43'; Hartkopf 50'; Schellinger 54'	Report	Permin 28'

Umpires:
Micheal Pontus (BEL)
Jake Charles (ENG)

15 July 2019
17:45

Netherlands	10–0	Austria
Van Bijnen 7', 7'; Hoedemakers 18', 23'; Charbon 30'; Middendorp 38'; Beins 41'; Van de Venne 43', 54'; Bijen 54'	Report

Umpires:
Mariusz Orzel (POL)
Antoine Duhem (FRA)

17 July 2019
09:00

Austria	1–6	France
Unterkircher 60'	Report	T. Clément 16'; Sellier 18'; Lenglet 25'; Igau 43', 59'; Desgouillons 54'

Umpires:
Alex Fedenczuk (SCO)
Jake Charles (ENG)

17 July 2019
11:15

Germany	1–2	Netherlands
Dösch 44'	Report	Lageman 19'; Hoedemakers 50'

Umpires:
Daniel Rodriguez (ESP)
Micheal Pontus (BEL)

18 July 2019
11:15

Austria	2–9	Germany
Kapounek 36'; Wellan 55'	Report	Schellinger 13', 34'; Weigand 21', 21'; Prinz 26'; Hartkopf 37', 60'; Michler 42'; Schwarzhaupt 59'

Umpires:
Daniel Veerman (NED)
Michael Pontus (BEL)

18 July 2019
17:45

Netherlands	0–0	France
	Report

Umpires:
Mariusz Orzel (POL)
Luka Zupancic (AUT)

=== Fifth to eighth place classification ===
The points obtained in the preliminary round against the other team are taken over.

==== Pool C ====
Pos	Team	Pld	W	D	L	GF	GA	GD	Pts	Qualification or relegation
5	Belgium	3	3	0	0	14	1	+13	9	Qualification for the 2021 FIH Junior World Cup
6	France	3	2	0	1	9	5	+4	6	Qualification for the 2021 FIH Junior World Cup
7	Poland (R)	3	1	0	2	4	10	−6	3	Relegation to the Junior Championship II
8	Austria (R)	3	0	0	3	3	14	−11	0	Relegation to the Junior Championship II

Source: FIH
(R) Relegated

20 July 2019
09:00

Poland	3–2	Austria
Jarzyński 13'; Majek 28', 52'	Report	Wellan 33'; Schippan 57'

Umpires:
Alex Fedenczuk (SCO)
Shane O'Donnell (IRL)

20 July 2019
11:15

Belgium	3–1	France
Ghislain 21'; Esquelin 24'; Sidler 40'	Report	Curty 49'

Umpires:
Johannes Berneth (GER)
Mariusz Orzel (POL)

21 July 2019
11:15

Belgium	5–0	Austria
Duvekot 8'; Muschs 17', 30'; Ghislain 28'; Stockbroekx 50'	Report

Umpires:
Jake Charles (ENG)
Antoine Duhem (FRA)

21 July 2019
13:30

France	2–1	Poland
Desgouillons 13'; Curty 42'	Report	Jarzyński 45'

Umpires:
Daniel Veerman (NED)
Daniel Rodriguez (ESP)

=== First to fourth place classification ===
Semi-finals
20 July
Spain	0
Germany	3
20 July
Netherlands	3
England	4

Final
21 July
Germany	5
England	3
Third place
21 July
Spain	1
Netherlands	3

==== Semi-finals ====
20 July 2019
15:45

Spain	0–3	Germany
	Report	Hartkopf 41', 50'; Prinz 59'

Umpires:
Daniel Veerman (NED)
Jake Charles (ENG)

20 July 2019
18:00

Netherlands	3–4	England
Bijen 2'; Van Bijnen 28'; Scheen 58'	Report	Way 12'; Russell 19'; Scott 49'; Griffiths 57'

Umpires:
Daniel Rodriguez (ESP)
Michael Pontus (BEL)

==== Third and fourth place ====
21 July 2019
15:00

Spain	1–3	Netherlands
Tello 31'	Report	Scheen 23'; Van de Venne 25'; Charbon 28'

Umpires:
Johannes Berneth (GER)
Luka Zupancic (AUT)

==== Final ====
21 July 2019
19:30

Germany	5–3	England
Hartkopf 19', 28', 44'; Schiffer 32'; Prinz 57'	Report	Rushmere 30+'; Oates 58'; Scott 59'

Umpires:
Alex Fedenczuk (SCO)
Shane O'Donnell (IRL)

== Statistics ==
=== Final standings ===
Pos	Team	Qualification or relegation
1	Germany (C)	Qualification for the 2021 Junior World Cup
2	England	Qualification for the 2021 Junior World Cup
3	Netherlands	Qualification for the 2021 Junior World Cup
4	Spain (H)	Qualification for the 2021 Junior World Cup
5	Belgium	Qualification for the 2021 Junior World Cup
6	France	Qualification for the 2021 Junior World Cup
7	Poland (R)	Relegation to the Junior Championship II
8	Austria (R)	Relegation to the Junior Championship II

Source: FIH
(C) Champion; (H) Host; (R) Relegated

=== Goalscorers ===
There were 107 goals scored in 20 matches, for an average of 5.35 goals per match.

8 goals

- (Germany) Raphael Hartkopf

5 goals

- (Germany) Justus Weigand

4 goals

- (England) Edward Way
- (Germany) Thies Prinz
- (Spain) Enrique Zorita

3 goals

- (Belgium) Emile Esquelin
- (Belgium) Max Muschs
- (England) Zach Wallace
- (Germany) Christian Schellinger
- (Netherlands) Tjep Hoedemakers
- (Netherlands) Brent van Bijnen
- (Netherlands) Jim van de Venne

2 goals

- (Austria) Nikolas Wellan
- (Belgium) William Ghislain
- (Belgium) Thibeau Stockbroekx
- (England) Gareth Griffiths
- (England) Stuart Rushmere
- (France) Eliot Curty
- (France) Mattéo Desgouillons
- (France) Antonin Igau
- (Germany) Paul Dösch
- (Germany) Jan Schiffer
- (Netherlands) Koen Bijen
- (Netherlands) Valentijn Charbon
- (Netherlands) Pepijn Scheen
- (Poland) Eryk Bembenek
- (Poland) Gracjan Jarzyński
- (Poland) Bartosz Majek
- (Spain) Ignacio Cobos
- (Spain) Álvaro Tello

1 goal

- (Austria) Andreas Kapounek
- (Austria) Phillip Schippan
- (Austria) Fabian Unterkircher
- (Belgium) Tobias Biekens
- (Belgium) Romain Delavignette
- (Belgium) Roman Duvekot
- (Belgium) Dylan Englebert
- (Belgium) Loïc Sidler
- (England) James Oates
- (England) Thomas Russell
- (France) Timothée Clément
- (France) Thomas Lenglet
- (France) Stéphane Permin
- (France) Corentin Sellier
- (Germany) Teo Hinrichs
- (Germany) Linus Michler
- (Germany) Benedikt Schwarzhaupt
- (Netherlands) Teun Beins
- (Netherlands) Silas Lageman
- (Netherlands) Floris Middendorp
- (Poland) Jacek Kurowski
- (Spain) Alejandro Alonso
- (Spain) Marc Reyné

Source: FIH

== See also ==
- 2019 Men's EuroHockey Junior Championship II
- 2019 Men's EuroHockey Nations Championship
- 2019 Women's EuroHockey Junior Championship
