= Teun Beins =

Dutch field hockey player

Personal information
- Born: 28 October 1998 (age 27) Breda, Netherlands

Sport
- Sport: Field hockey
- Position: Defender
- Club: Bloemendaal
Youth career
- Years: Team
- –2008: MHC Teteringen
- 2008–2016: Push
Senior career
Years	Team	Caps	Goals
2016–2021	Oranje-Rood	-	-
2021–present	Bloemendaal	-	-
National team
Years	Team	Caps	Goals
2017–2019	Netherlands U21	10	(3)
2019–present	Netherlands	49	(3)
Medal record
Men's field hockey
Representing the Netherlands
World Cup
Bronze medal – third place	2023 Bhubaneswar–Rourkela
EuroHockey Junior Championship
Gold medal – first place	2017 Valencia
Bronze medal – third place	2019 Valencia
- Updated on 25 April 2025

Teun Beins (born 28 October 1998) is a Dutch field hockey player who plays as a defender or midfielder for Hoofdklasse club Bloemendaal and the Dutch national team.

== Career ==
=== Club hockey ===
In the Dutch Hoofdklasse, Beins plays for Bloemendaal.

=== National teams ===
==== Under–21 ====
Beins made his debut for the Netherlands U–21 team in 2017 during a test series against Germany in Mönchengladbach. Later that year he won a gold medal with the team at the EuroHockey Junior Championship in Valencia, Spain.

In 2019, two years after his debut, Beins returned to the junior national team at another EuroHockey Junior Championship, on this occasion winning a bronze medal.

==== Oranje ====
Teun Beins made his senior debut for the Oranje in 2019 during a season one of the FIH Pro League.

He has since gone on to make a number of appearances for the national team, before being named in the official squad for the first time in 2022. As a defender, Beins scored three times for the Orange squad from a penalty corner during the 2023 Men's FIH Hockey World Cup in India. Oranje won the bronze medal.
