= Arno Van Dessel =

Belgian field hockey player

Personal information
- Full name: Arno Steven M. Van Dessel
- Born: 3 July 2003 (age 23) Belgium

Sport
- Sport: Field hockey
- Position: Midfielder
- Club: Bloemendaal
Youth career
- Team
- –: Herakles
Senior career
Years	Team	Caps	Goals
2020–2025	Herakles	-	-
2025–present	Bloemendaal	-	-
National team
Years	Team	Caps	Goals
2021–2022	Belgium U21	11	(1)
2022–present	Belgium	55	(1)
Medal record
Men's field hockey
Representing Belgium
EuroHockey Championship
Bronze medal – third place	2023 Mönchengladbach
EuroHockey Junior Championship
Bronze medal – third place	2022 Ghent

Arno Steven M. Van Dessel (born 3 July 2003) is a Belgian field hockey player who plays as a midfielder for Dutch Hoofdklasse club Bloemendaal and the Belgium national team.

Van Dessel represented Belgium at the 2023 EuroHockey Championship and the 2024 Summer Olympics.

== Club career ==
Van Dessel came through the youth ranks of Herakles and was a part of the first team since September 2020. He won the Golden Stick in 2022 for the best young player in Belgium. In February 2025, it was announced he would leave Belgium to play for Bloemendaal in the Dutch Hoofdklasse from the 2025–26 season onwards.
