= Jan Schiffer =

German field hockey player

Personal information
- Born: 3 May 1998 (age 28) Germany

Sport
- Sport: Field hockey
- Position: Midfield
- Club: Uhlenhorst Mülheim
National team
| Years | Team | Caps | Goals |
| 2016–2019 | Germany U–21 | 50 | (31) |
| 2020– | Germany | 2 | (0) |
Medal record
Men's field hockey
Representing Germany
FIH Junior World Cup
| Bronze medal – third place | 2016 Lucknow |
EuroHockey Junior Championship
| Gold medal – first place | 2019 Valencia |
| Bronze medal – third place | 2017 Valencia |

Jan Schiffer (born 5 May 1998) is a German field hockey player.

== Career ==
=== Club level ===
In club competition, Schiffer plays for Uhlenhorst Mülheim in the German Bundesliga.

=== Junior national team ===
Jan Schiffer made his debut for the German U–21 team in 2016. His first appearance was during a test series in Mannheim. Later that year he went on to represent the team at the FIH Junior World Cup in Lucknow, winning a bronze medal.

In 2017, he won a second bronze medal with the junior team at the EuroHockey Junior Championship in Valencia.

His final year with the team was 2019. He made multiple appearances throughout the year, competing in numerous test matched and at an eight-nations tournament in Madrid. He finished his junior career on a high, winning gold at the EuroHockey Junior Championship in Valencia.

=== National team ===
Schiffer made his debut for the German national team in 2020, during a test series against South Africa in Johannesburg.
