= James Oates (field hockey) =

England field hockey player (born 1998)

Personal information
- Born: 18 April 1998 (age 28) England

Sport
- Sport: Field hockey
Senior career
Years	Team	Caps	Goals
2014–2018	Canterbury	-	-
2018–2026	Hampstead & Westminster	-	-
National team
Years	Team	Caps	Goals
2022–	England	18	(2)
2022–	Great Britain	9	(1)
Medal record
Men's field hockey
Representing England
EuroHockey Championship
Silver medal – second place	2023 Mönchengladbach

James Oates (born 18 April 1998) is an English field hockey player who has represented the England and Great Britain national teams.

== Biography ==
Oates was educated at The King's School, Canterbury. and plays club hockey in the Men's England Hockey League for Hampstead & Westminster Hockey Club having previously played for Canterbury Hockey Club until 2018/19.

After winning the 2019 Sultan of Johor Cup, he made his England debut in February 2022 against Spain at the FIH Pro League. He then made his Great Britain in the 2022/23 FIH Pro League.

He won a silver medal with England at the 2023 Men's EuroHockey Championship in Mönchengladbach.
