= William Ghislain =

Belgian field hockey player

Personal information
- Born: 28 July 1999 (age 27) Belgium

Sport
- Sport: Field hockey
- Position: Forward
- Club: Waterloo Ducks
National team
Years	Team	Caps	Goals
2019	Belgium U–21	10	(2)
2019–	Belgium	34	(8)
Medal record
Men's field hockey
Representing Belgium
EuroHockey Championship
Bronze medal – third place	2023 Mönchengladbach	Team
FIH Pro League
Silver medal – second place	Season Three	Team
Bronze medal – third place	Season Four	Team

William Ghislain (born 28 July 1999) is a field hockey player from Belgium, who plays as a forward.

== Career ==
=== Domestic league ===
In the ION Hockey League, Ghislain represents the Waterloo Ducks first team.

=== National teams ===
Ghislain has represented Belgium at both junior and senior level.

==== Under–21 ====
In 2019 he made his debut for the Belgium U–21 team during an eight–nations tournament in Madrid, winning a bronze medal. Later that year he went on to represent the team again at the EuroHockey Junior Championship in Valencia where the team finished 5th.

==== Red Lions ====
Prior to making his junior debut, Ghislain earned his first senior cap in a 2019 test match against Russia. He went on to appear in the team three more times that year.

He has since represented the team during seasons two, three and four of the FIH Pro League. Of these squads, he won silver and bronze at the latter two, respectively. Since his debut, Ghislain has been a constant member of the national squad.

He won his first medal at a major tournament in 2023, taking home bronze at the EuroHockey Championship in Mönchengladbach.

In 2024 he represented the team at the FIH Olympic Qualifiers in Valencia, where the team earned qualification to the XXXIII Olympic Games in Paris.
