= Tjep Hoedemakers =

Dutch field hockey player (born 1999)

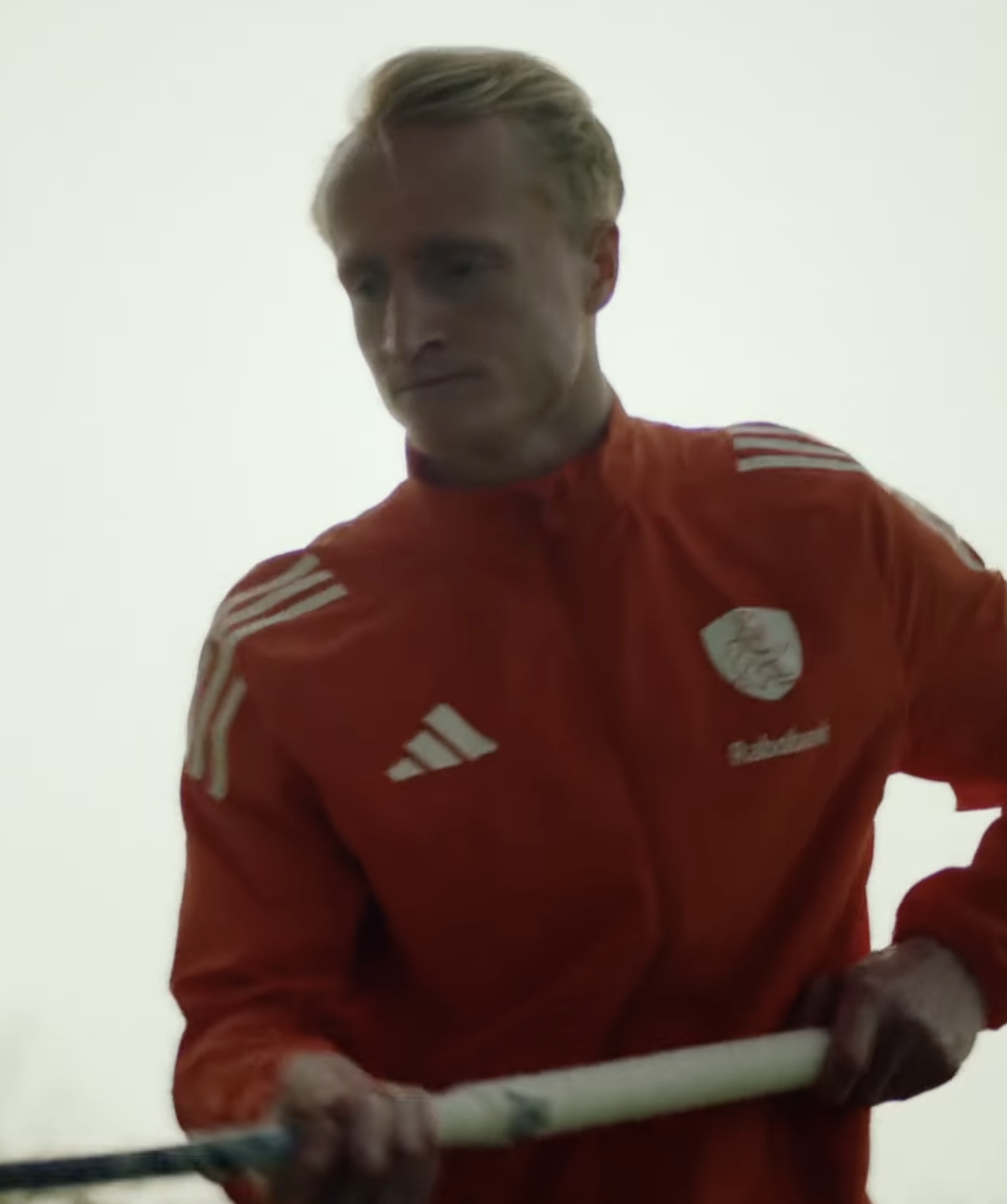
- Tjep Hoedemakers in a commercial in 2026

Personal information
- Born: 14 October 1999 (age 26) Geldrop, Netherlands

Sport
- Sport: Field hockey
- Position: Forward
- Club: Rotterdam
Youth career
- Years: Team
- –2016: Oranje Zwart
- 2016–2017: Oranje-Rood
- 2017–2018: Rotterdam
Senior career
| Years | Team | Caps | Goals |
| 2018–present | Rotterdam | - | - |
National team
| Years | Team | Caps | Goals |
| 2019 | Netherlands U21 | 10 | (6) |
| 2021–present | Netherlands | 75 | (23) |
Medal record
Men's field hockey
Representing the Netherlands
Olympic Games
| Gold medal – first place | 2024 Paris | Team |
FIH Hockey World Cup
| Bronze medal – third place | 2023 Bhubaneswar–Rourkela |
EuroHockey Championship
| Silver medal – second place | 2025 Mönchengladbach |
EuroHockey Junior Championship
| Bronze medal – third place | 2019 Valencia |

Tjep Hoedemakers (born 14 October 1999) is a Dutch field hockey player who plays as a forward for Hoofdklasse club Rotterdam and the Dutch national team.

== Club career ==
Hoedemakers played in the youth ranks of Oranje Zwart and Oranje-Rood until 2018 when he moved to Rotterdam. After one season in the under-18 team and training with the first team and already playing a few matches he officially joined the first senior team.

== International career ==
=== Under–21 ===
In 2019, Hoedemakers made his debut for the national junior team during an eight-nations tournament in Madrid. He went on to represent the team at the EuroHockey Junior Championship in Valencia later that year, winning a bronze medal.

=== Oranje ===
Tjep Hoedemakers made his senior debut for the Oranje in 2021 during season three of the FIH Pro League. He was officially named in the national senior squad in 2022. He was originally selected for the squad for the 2023 Men's EuroHockey Championship but he had to withdraw because of on injury.
