= Field hockey at the 2024 Summer Olympics – Men's tournament =

Men's field hockey at the 2024 Summer Olympics

Tournament details
- Host country: France
- City: Paris
- Dates: 30 July – 8 August
- Teams: 12 (from 5 confederations)
- Venue: Stade Yves-du-Manoir

Final positions
- Champions: Netherlands (3rd title)
- Runner-up: Germany
- Third place: India

Tournament statistics
- Matches played: 38
- Goals scored: 154 (4.05 per match)
- Top scorer: (India) Harmanpreet Singh (10 goals)
All statistics are correct as of 8 August 2024


The men's field hockey tournament at the 2024 Summer Olympics was the 25th edition of the field hockey event for men at the Summer Olympics. It took place from 27 July to 8 August 2024. All games were played at the Stade Yves-du-Manoir in Paris, France.

The Netherlands took home gold after a finals victory over Germany for their third title, while India took the bronze medal.

== Competition schedule ==
In the preliminary round, games were played on two pitches.

G	Group stage	¼	Quarter-finals	½	Semi-finals	B	Bronze medal match	F	Final

Sat 27	Sun 28	Mon 29	Tue 30	Wed 31	Thu 1	Fri 2	Sat 3	Sun 4	Mon 5	Tue 6	Wed 7	Thu 8	
G	G	G	G	G	G	G		¼		½		B	F

== Competition format ==
The twelve teams in the tournament were divided into two groups of six, with each team initially playing round-robin games within their group. Following the completion of the round-robin stage, the top four teams from each group advanced to the quarter-finals. The two semi-final winners met for the gold medal match, while the semi-final losers played in the bronze medal match.

== Qualification ==
Each of the Continental Champions from five confederations received an automatic berth. France as the host nation qualified automatically. The other teams qualified through the 2024 Men's FIH Hockey Olympic Qualifiers.

Qualification	Date	Host/Country	Berths	Qualified team
Host country	—N/a		1	France
2023 Oceania Cup	10–13 August 2023	Whangarei	1	Australia
2023 EuroHockey Championship	19–27 August 2023	Mönchengladbach	1	Netherlands
2022 Asian Games	24 September − 6 October 2023	Hangzhou	1	India
2023 Pan American Games	25 October – 3 November 2023	Santiago	1	Argentina
2023 African Olympic Qualifier	29 October – 5 November 2023	Pretoria	1	South Africa
2024 FIH Hockey Olympic Qualifiers	13–21 January 2024	Valencia	3	Belgium; Spain; Ireland
2024 FIH Hockey Olympic Qualifiers	13–21 January 2024	Muscat	3	Germany; Great Britain; New Zealand
Total			12	

== Umpires ==
On 12 September 2023, 14 umpires were appointed by the FIH.

- Gabriel Labate (ARG)
- Irene Presenqui (ARG)
- Zeke Newman (AUS)
- Steve Rogers (AUS)
- Jakub Mejzlík (CZE)
- Ben Göntgen (GER)
- Dan Barstow (GBR)
- Martin Madden (GBR)
- Sarah Wilson (GBR)
- Raghu Prasad (IND)
- Coen van Bunge (NED)
- Jonas van 't Hek (NED)
- Gareth Greenfield (NZL)
- David Tomlinson (NZL)
- Marcin Grochal (POL)
- Lim Hong Zhen (SGP)
- Sean Rapaport (RSA)

== Group stage ==
The pools were announced on 22 January 2024. The match schedule was announced on 6 March 2024.

All times are local (UTC+2).

=== Group A ===
Pos	Team	Pld	W	D	L	GF	GA	GD	Pts	Qualification
1	Germany	5	4	0	1	16	6	+10	12	Advance to quarter-finals
2	Netherlands	5	3	1	1	16	9	+7	10	Advance to quarter-finals
3	Great Britain	5	2	2	1	11	7	+4	8	Advance to quarter-finals
4	Spain	5	2	1	2	11	12	−1	7	Advance to quarter-finals
5	South Africa	5	1	1	3	11	17	−6	4	
6	France (H)	5	0	1	4	8	22	−14	1	

Source: FIH
Rules for classification: 1) points; 2) matches won; 3) goal difference; 4) goals for; 5) head-to-head result; 6) field goals scored.
(H) Hosts

27 July 2024
10:00
v

Great Britain	4–0	Spain
Park 13'; Furlong 16', 48'; Shipperley 58'	Report

Pitch 1
Umpires:
Steve Rogers (AUS)
Raghu Prasad (IND)

27 July 2024
12:45
v

Netherlands	5–3	South Africa
Janssen 2', 30'; De Geus 10'; Hoedemakers 16'; Telgenkamp 33'	Report	M. Cassiem 7'; Kok 34'; Guise-Brown 44'

Pitch 1
Umpires:
David Tomlinson (NZL)
Lim Hong Zhen (SGP)

27 July 2024
17:00
v

Germany	8–2	France
Weigand 1', 44'; Rühr 7'; Prinz 19'; M. Grambusch 21'; T. Grambusch 22'; Wellen 33', 49'	Report	Masson 15+'; Charlet 59'

Pitch 1
Umpires:
Zeke Newman (AUS)
Gareth Greenfield (NZL)

28 July 2024
17:00
v

Germany	0–2	Spain
	Report	Basterra 32'; Cunill 53'

Pitch 1
Umpires:
Jonas van 't Hek (NED)
Martin Madden (GBR)

28 July 2024
19:45
v

Netherlands	4–0	France
Reyenga 7'; Bijen 28'; De Geus 31'; Telgenkamp 54'	Report

Pitch 1
Umpires:
Sean Rapaport (RSA)
Irene Presenqui (ARG)

28 July 2024
20:15
v

South Africa	2–2	Great Britain
Hobson 11'; Sherwood 53'	Report	Roper 32'; Shipperley 59'

Pitch 2
Umpires:
Marcin Grochal (POL)
Laurine Delforge (BEL)

30 July 2024
10:00
v

Spain	3–3	France
Iglesias 28'; Vilallonga 32'; Cunill 51'	Report	Clément 8', 13'; Martin-Brisac 45'

Pitch 1
Umpires:
Lim Hong Zhen (SGP)
Coen van Bunge (NED)

30 July 2024
10:30
v

South Africa	1–5	Germany
Guise-Brown 35'	Report	Peillat 1', 39'; Rühr 15'; Weigand 17'; M. Grambusch 58'

Pitch 2
Umpires:
Dan Barstow (GBR)
Raghu Prasad (IND)

30 July 2024
12:45
v

Great Britain	2–2	Netherlands
Morton 56', 58'	Report	Wortelboer 45'; Van Dam 52'

Pitch 1
Umpires:
Gabriel Labate (ARG)
Ben Göntgen (GER)

31 July 2024
17:30
v

Germany	1–0	Netherlands
Wellen 3'	Report

Pitch 2
Umpires:
Martin Madden (GBR)
David Tomlinson (NZL)

31 July 2024
19:45
v

Spain	3–0	South Africa
Reyne 25', 53'; Basterra 37'	Report

Pitch 1
Umpires:
Gareth Greenfield (NZL)
Ben Göntgen (GER)

1 August 2024
12:45
v

France	1–2	Great Britain
Clément 30'	Report	Wallace 41'; Albery 54'

Pitch 1
Umpires:
Sean Rapaport (RSA)
David Tomlinson (NZL)

2 August 2024
10:30
v

Netherlands	5–3	Spain
Janssen 19', 53'; Hoedemakers 40', 48'; Wortelboer 43'	Report	Basterra 7'; Reyné 15'; Miralles 48'

Pitch 2
Umpires:
Dan Barstow (GBR)
Sean Rapaport (RSA)

2 August 2024
19:45
v

France	2–5	South Africa
Clément 16'; Charlet 25'	Report	Guise-Brown 2'; Horne 23'; M. Cassiem 56'; D. Cassiem 57', 60'

Pitch 1
Umpires:
Lim Hong Zhen (SGP)
Marcin Grochal (POL)

2 August 2024
20:15
v

Great Britain	1–2	Germany
Furlong 49'	Report	Rühr 19', 25'

Pitch 2
Umpires:
Coen van Bunge (NED)
Gareth Greenfield (NZL)

=== Group B ===
Pos	Team	Pld	W	D	L	GF	GA	GD	Pts	Qualification
1	Belgium	5	4	1	0	15	7	+8	13	Advance to quarter-finals
2	India	5	3	1	1	10	7	+3	10	Advance to quarter-finals
3	Australia	5	3	0	2	12	10	+2	9	Advance to quarter-finals
4	Argentina	5	2	2	1	8	6	+2	8	Advance to quarter-finals
5	Ireland	5	1	0	4	4	9	−5	3	
6	New Zealand	5	0	0	5	4	14	−10	0	

Source: FIH
Rules for classification: 1) points; 2) matches won; 3) goal difference; 4) goals for; 5) head-to-head result; 6) field goals scored.

27 July 2024
10:30
v

Belgium	2–0	Ireland
Boon 25'; Hendrickx 49'	Report

Pitch 2
Umpires:
Sean Rapaport (RSA)
Gabriel Labate (ARG)

27 July 2024
13:15
v

Australia	1–0	Argentina
Govers 30+'	Report

Pitch 2
Umpires:
Coen van Bunge (NED)
Ben Göntgen (GER)

27 July 2024
17:30
v

India	3–2	New Zealand
Mandeep 24'; Vivek 34'; Harmanpreet 59'	Report	Lane 8'; Child 53'

Pitch 2
Umpires:
Marcin Grochal (POL)
Martin Madden (GBR)

28 July 2024
17:30
v

Belgium	2–1	New Zealand
Hendrickx 8'; Van Aubel 44'	Report	Lane 43'

Pitch 2
Umpires:
Steve Rogers (AUS)
Dan Barstow (GBR)

29 July 2024
10:00
v

Ireland	1–2	Australia
Cole 25'	Report	Weyer 9'; Govers 30'

Pitch 1
Umpires:
Sarah Wilson (GBR)
Jonas van 't Hek (NED)

29 July 2024
12:45
v

India	1–1	Argentina
Harmanpreet 59'	Report	Martínez 22'

Pitch 1
Umpires:
Daniel Barstow (GBR)
Zeke Newman (AUS)

30 July 2024
13:15
v

Ireland	0–2	India
	Report	Harmanpreet 11', 19'

Pitch 2
Umpires:
Steve Rogers (AUS)
David Tomlinson (NZL)

30 July 2024
17:00
v

Argentina	2–0	New Zealand
Domene 24'; Martínez 60'	Report

Pitch 1
Umpires:
Jonas van 't Hek (NED)
Sean Rapaport (RSA)

30 July 2024
19:45
v

Australia	2–6	Belgium
Sharp 28'; Govers 44'	Report	Hendrickx 7'; Boon 15', 30', 57'; Van Aubel 35'; Kina 38'

Pitch 1
Umpires:
Marcin Grochal (POL)
Gareth Greenfield (NZL)

1 August 2024
10:00
v

India	1–2	Belgium
Abhishek 18'	Report	Stockbroekx 33'; Dohmen 44'

Pitch 1
Umpires:
Coen van Bunge (NED)
Zeke Newman (AUS)

1 August 2024
10:30
v

New Zealand	0–5	Australia
	Report	Wickham 22'; Govers 25', 52', 57'; Willott 42'

Pitch 2
Umpires:
Lim Hong Zhen (SGP)
Gabriel Labate (ARG)

1 August 2024
13:15
v

Argentina	2–1	Ireland
Domene 17'; Casella 28'	Report	Cole 27'

Pitch 2
Umpires:
Raghu Prasad (IND)
Marcin Grochal (POL)

2 August 2024
13:15
v

Australia	2–3	India
Craig 25'; Govers 55'	Report	Abhishek 12'; Harmanpreet 13', 32'

Pitch 2
Umpires:
Jonas van 't Hek (NED)
Gabriel Labate (ARG)

2 August 2024
17:00
v

New Zealand	1–2	Ireland
Morrison 5'	Report	Walker 13'; Duncan 31'

Pitch 1
Umpires:
Ben Göntgen (GER)
Zeke Newman (AUS)

2 August 2024
17:30
v

Belgium	3–3	Argentina
De Kerpel 34'; Hendrickx 52'; Stockbroekx 60'	Report	Casella 5'; Domene 45'; Rey 53'

Pitch 2
Umpires:
Steve Rogers (AUS)
Martin Madden (GBR)

== Knockout stage ==
=== Bracket ===
Quarter-finals
4 August
Germany	3
Argentina	2
4 August
India (p.s.o.)	1 (4)
Great Britain	1 (2)
4 August
Netherlands	2
Australia	0
4 August
Belgium	2
Spain	3

Semi-finals
6 August
Germany	3
India	2
6 August
Netherlands	4
Spain	0

Gold medal match
8 August
Germany	1 (1)
Netherlands (p.s.o.)	1 (3)
Bronze medal match
8 August
India	2
Spain	1

=== Quarter-finals ===
4 August 2024
10:00
v

India	1–1	Great Britain
Harmanpreet 22'	Report; Shootout report	Morton 27'
Penalties
Harmanpreet (penalty shoot-out scored); Sukhjeet (penalty shoot-out scored); Lalit (penalty shoot-out scored); Raj Kumar (penalty shoot-out scored)	4–2	(penalty shoot-out scored) Albery; (penalty shoot-out scored) Wallace; (penalty shoot-out missed) Williamson; (penalty shoot-out missed) Roper

Pitch 1
Umpires:
Sean Rapaport (RSA)
Steve Rogers (AUS)

4 August 2024
12:30
v

Belgium	2–3	Spain
De Sloover 41'; Hendrickx 58'	Report	Basterra 40'; Reyné 55'; Miralles 57'

Pitch 1
Umpires:
Gabriel Labate (ARG)
Jonas van 't Hek (NED)

4 August 2024
17:30
v

Netherlands	2–0	Australia
Telgenkamp 35'; Van Dam 52'	Report

Pitch 1
Umpires:
Dan Barstow (GBR)
Gareth Greenfield (NZL)

4 August 2024
20:00
v

Germany	3–2	Argentina
Hinrichs 9'; Peillat 24'; Weigand 54'	Report	Casella 11'; Mazilli 48'

Pitch 1
Umpires:
Zeke Newman (AUS)
David Tomlinson (NZL)

=== Semi-finals ===
6 August 2024
14:00
v

Netherlands	4–0	Spain
Janssen 12'; Brinkman 20' van Dam 32'; Telgenkamp 50'	Report

Pitch 1
Umpires:
Ben Göntgen (GER)
Martin Madden (GBR)

6 August 2024
19:00
v

Germany	3–2	India
Peillat 18'; Rühr 27'; Miltkau 54'	Report	Harmanpreet 7'; Sukhjeet 36'

Pitch 1
Umpires:
Coen van Bunge (NED)
Gareth Greenfield (NZL)

=== Bronze medal match ===
8 August 2024
14:00
v

(bronze) India	2–1	Spain
Harmanpreet 30', 33'	Report	Miralles 18'

Pitch 1
Umpires:
Coen van Bunge (NED)
Ben Göntgen (GER)

=== Gold medal match ===
8 August 2024
19:00
v

(silver) Germany	1–1	Netherlands (gold)
Prinz 50'	Report; Shootout report	Brinkman 46'
Penalties
Wellen (penalty shoot-out missed); H. Müller (penalty shoot-out missed); Prinz (penalty shoot-out missed); Weigand (penalty shoot-out scored)	1–3	(penalty shoot-out missed) De Geus; (penalty shoot-out missed) De Mol; (penalty shoot-out scored) Brinkman; (penalty shoot-out scored) Van Dam; (penalty shoot-out scored) Telgenkamp

Stade Yves-du-Manoir
Attendance: 15,000
Umpires:
Martin Madden (GBR)
Steve Rogers (AUS)

== Final ranking ==
As per statistical convention in field hockey, matches decided in regular time are counted as wins and losses, while matches decided by penalty shoot-outs are counted as draws.

Pos	Team	Pld	W	D	L	GF	GA	GD	Pts	Final result
1	Netherlands	8	5	2	1	23	10	+13	17	Gold medal
2	Germany	8	6	1	1	23	11	+12	19	Silver medal
3	India	8	4	2	2	15	12	+3	14	Bronze medal
4	Spain	8	3	1	4	15	20	−5	10	Fourth place
5	Belgium	6	4	1	1	17	10	+7	13	Eliminated in quarter-finals
6	Australia	6	3	0	3	12	12	0	9	Eliminated in quarter-finals
7	Great Britain	6	2	3	1	12	8	+4	9	Eliminated in quarter-finals
8	Argentina	6	2	2	2	10	9	+1	8	Eliminated in quarter-finals
9	South Africa	5	1	1	3	11	17	−6	4	Eliminated in group stage
10	Ireland	5	1	0	4	4	9	−5	3	Eliminated in group stage
11	France (H)	5	0	1	4	8	22	−14	1	Eliminated in group stage
12	New Zealand	5	0	0	5	4	14	−10	0	Eliminated in group stage

Source: Olympics
(H) Hosts

== Goalscorers ==
There were 154 goals scored in 38 matches, for an average of 4.05 goals per match.

10 goals

- (India) Harmanpreet Singh

7 goals

- (Australia) Blake Govers

5 goals

- (Belgium) Alexander Hendrickx
- (Germany) Christopher Rühr
- (Netherlands) Jip Janssen

4 goals

- (Belgium) Tom Boon
- (France) Timothée Clément
- (Germany) Gonzalo Peillat
- (Germany) Justus Weigand
- (Netherlands) Duco Telgenkamp
- (Spain) José Basterra
- (Spain) Marc Reyné

3 goals

- (Argentina) Maico Casella
- (Argentina) Tomas Domene
- (Germany) Niklas Wellen
- (United Kingdom) Gareth Furlong
- (United Kingdom) Lee Morton
- (Netherlands) Thijs van Dam
- (Netherlands) Tjep Hoedemakers
- (South Africa) Matthew Guise-Brown
- (Spain) Marc Miralles
- (France) Victor Charlet

2 goals

- (Argentina) Lucas Martínez
- (Belgium) Florent Van Aubel
- (Belgium) Thibeau Stockbroekx
- (Germany) Mats Grambusch
- (Germany) Thies Prinz
- (United Kingdom) Rupert Shipperley
- (India) Abhishek Nain
- (Republic of Ireland) Lee Cole
- (Netherlands) Thierry Brinkman
- (Netherlands) Jonas de Geus
- (Netherlands) Floris Wortelboer
- (New Zealand) Sam Lane
- (South Africa) Dayaan Cassiem
- (South Africa) Mustapha Cassiem
- (Spain) Pepe Cunill

1 goal

- (Argentina) Matías Rey
- (Argentina) Agustín Mazzilli
- (Australia) Tom Craig
- (Australia) Lachlan Sharp
- (Australia) Corey Weyer
- (Australia) Tom Wickham
- (Australia) Ky Willott
- (Belgium) John-John Dohmen
- (Belgium) Nicolas De Kerpel
- (Belgium) Antoine Kina
- (Belgium) Arthur De Sloover
- (France) Simon Martin-Brisac
- (France) Charles Masson
- (Germany) Tom Grambusch
- (Germany) Teo Hinrichs
- (Germany) Marco Miltkau
- (United Kingdom) James Albery
- (United Kingdom) Nicholas Park
- (United Kingdom) Phil Roper
- (United Kingdom) Zach Wallace
- (India) Vivek Prasad
- (India) Mandeep Singh
- (India) Sukhjeet Singh
- (Republic of Ireland) Jeremy Duncan
- (Republic of Ireland) Benjamin Walker
- (Netherlands) Koen Bijen
- (Netherlands) Tijmen Reyenga
- (New Zealand) Simon Child
- (New Zealand) Joe Morrison
- (South Africa) Andrew Hobson
- (South Africa) Keenan Horne
- (South Africa) Tevin Kok
- (South Africa) Bradley Sherwood
- (Spain) Álvaro Iglesias
- (Spain) Rafael Vilallonga

Source: Olympics
