= Raphael Hartkopf =

German field hockey player (born 1998)

Personal information
- Born: 24 November 1998 (age 27) Germany

Sport
- Sport: Field hockey
- Position: Forward
- Club: Mannheimer HC
National team
| Years | Team | Caps | Goals |
| 2017–2019 | Germany U–21 | 30 | (24) |
| 2021– | Germany | 6 | (0) |
Medal record
Men's field hockey
Representing Germany
EuroHockey Championships
| Gold medal – first place | 2025 Mönchengladbach |
EuroHockey Junior Championship
| Gold medal – first place | 2019 Valencia |
| Bronze medal – third place | 2017 Valencia |

Rapael Hartkopf (born 24 November 1998) is a German field hockey player.

== Career ==
=== Club level ===
In club competition, Hartkopf plays for Mannheimer in the German Bundesliga.

=== Junior national team ===
Raphael Hartkopf made his debut for the German U–21 team in 2017. His first appearance was during a test series against England in Neustadt. Later that year he went on to win a bronze medal with the team at the EuroHockey Junior Championship in Valencia.

His final year with the team was 2019. He made multiple appearances throughout the year, competing in numerous test matches and at an eight-nations tournament in Madrid. He finished his junior career on a high, winning gold at the EuroHockey Junior Championship in Valencia.

=== Die Honamas ===
Hartkopf made his debut for Die Honamas in 2021, during season two of the FIH Pro League.

Following the retirements of senior players following the 2020 Summer Olympics, Hartkopf was officially added to the national squad.
