= 2025 Men's EuroHockey Championship =

Field hockey tournament in Mönchengladbach, Germany

Tournament details
- Host country: Germany
- City: Mönchengladbach
- Dates: 8–16 August
- Teams: 8 (from 1 confederation)
- Venue: Warsteiner HockeyPark

Final positions
- Champions: Germany (9th title)
- Runner-up: Netherlands
- Third place: Spain

Tournament statistics
- Matches played: 20
- Goals scored: 105 (5.25 per match)
- Top scorer: (Germany) Gonzalo Peillat (6 goals)
- Best player: (Germany) Mats Grambusch
- Best young player: (France) Malo Martinache
- Best goalkeeper: (France) Corentin Saunier

The 2025 Men's EuroHockey Championship was the twentieth edition of the Men's EuroHockey Championship, the biennial international men's field hockey championship of Europe organised by the European Hockey Federation.

The tournament was held alongside the women's tournament at the Warsteiner HockeyPark in Mönchengladbach, Germany from 8 to 16 August 2025. It was the third time Mönchengladbach hosted the event.

The Netherlands were the two-time defending champions, they did not defend their title as they lost to Germany 4–1 in a shoot-out after the final finished 1–1 in regular time. It was a record-extending ninth title for Germany. As the winner, Germany qualified for the 2026 Men's FIH Hockey World Cup in Wavre, Belgium and Amstelveen, Netherlands. Spain won the bronze medal as they defeated France 2–0.

== Qualification ==
The top six teams from the 2023 edition qualified directly for this edition of the tournament. The last two teams will be the winners of the two sets of EuroHockey Qualifiers taking place in Vienna, Austria and Dublin, Ireland in August 2024.

=== Qualified teams ===
Dates	Event	Location	Quotas	Qualifiers
19–27 August 2023	2023 EuroHockey Championship	Mönchengladbach, Germany	6	Netherlands; England; Belgium; Germany; France; Spain
22–25 August 2024	EuroHockey Qualifiers	Vienna, Austria	1	Austria
22–25 August 2024	EuroHockey Qualifiers	Dublin, Ireland	1	Poland
Total			8	

== Draw ==
The draw was held shortly after the EuroHockey Championship Qualifiers events are played.

=== Seeding ===
Pot 1	Pot 2	Pot 3	Pot 4
Netherlands; Germany	England; Belgium	Spain; France	Austria; Poland

== Preliminary round ==
The pools were announced on 12 September 2024.

=== Pool A ===
Pos	Team	Pld	W	D	L	GF	GA	GD	Pts	Qualification
1	Netherlands	3	3	0	0	12	2	+10	9	Semi-finals
2	Spain	3	2	0	1	12	4	+8	6	Semi-finals
3	Belgium	3	1	0	2	13	7	+6	3	
4	Austria	3	0	0	3	1	25	−24	0	

Source: FIH
Rules for classification: 1) points; 2) matches won; 3) goal difference; 4) goals for; 5) head-to-head result; 6) field goals for.

9 August 2025
11:00

Belgium	10–1	Austria
Van Oost 16'; Boon 17', 39'; Stockbroekx 34'; Hendrickx 35', 51'; De Kerpel 40'; Duvekot 53'; Kina 57'; De Sloover 60'	Report	Winkler 15'

Umpires:
Tim Meissner (GER)
Alex Fedenczuk (SCO)

9 August 2025
13:15

Netherlands	3–0	Spain
Hoedemakers 26'; Janssen 40'; Middendorp 41'	Report

Umpires:
Ben Göntgen (GER)
Marcin Grochal (POL)

10 August 2025
17:30

Belgium	2–4	Netherlands
Onana 16'; Hellin 35'	Report	Pieters 10', 47'; Janssen 22', 55'

Umpires:
Alison Keogh (IRL)
Paul Walker (ENG)

10 August 2025
19:45

Spain	10–0	Austria
Font 1'; Cabré-Verdiell 5', 53'; Clapés 10', 32'; Basterra 41'; Reyné 45'; Álvarez 46', 57'; Cunill 58'	Report

Umpires:
Rebecca Edwards (ENG)
Alex Fedenczuk (SCO)

12 August 2025
14:45

Spain	2–1	Belgium
Alonso 15'; Basterra 28'	Report	De Kerpel 18'

Umpires:
Coen van Bunge (NED)
Rachel Williams (ENG)

12 August 2025
17:00

Netherlands	5–0	Austria
Brinkman 1'; Bijen 20', 36', 53'; Hoedemakers 42'	Report

Umpires:
Ben Göntgen (GER)
Sandra Adell (ESP)

=== Pool B ===
Pos	Team	Pld	W	D	L	GF	GA	GD	Pts	Qualification
1	Germany (H)	3	2	1	0	14	3	+11	7	Semi-finals
2	France	3	2	0	1	10	8	+2	6	Semi-finals
3	England	3	1	1	1	8	4	+4	4	
4	Poland	3	0	0	3	3	20	−17	0	

Source: FIH
Rules for classification: 1) points; 2) matches won; 3) goal difference; 4) goals for; 5) head-to-head result; 6) field goals for.
(H) Hosts

8 August 2025
17:00

England	5–0	Poland
Goodfield 24'; Payton 42'; Roper 54'; Ward 56'; Sorsby 60'	Report

Umpires:
Alison Keogh (IRL)
Coen van Bunge (NED)

8 August 2025
19:30

Germany	3–2	France
Weigand 50', 55'; Peillat 51'	Report	Charlet 43', 48'

Umpires:
Rachel Williams (ENG)
Paul Walker (ENG)

9 August 2025
20:15

France	5–3	Poland
Sellier 16'; Charlet 24', 29'; Clément 38'; Esmenjaud 48'	Report	Jarzyński 15'; Bembenek 17'; Rutkowski 35'

Umpires:
Sébastien Michielsen (BEL)
Shane O'Donell (IRL)

10 August 2025
15:00

England	1–1	Germany
Gall 45'	Report	Peillat 52'

Umpires:
Sébastien Michielsen (BEL)
Magali Sergeant (BEL)

12 August 2025
12:30

France	3–2	England
Bellenger 24'; Desgouillons 45'; Clément 60'	Report	Rushmere 10', 54'

Umpires:
Laurine Delforge (BEL)
Marcin Grochal (POL)

12 August 2025
19:30

Germany	10–0	Poland
M. Grambusch 2'; Prinz 9', 12'; Hartkopf 15+', 29', 42'; Peillat 30', 59'; Hellwig 54'; Weigand 58'	Report

Umpires:
Ivona Makar (CRO)
Lorijn de Kraker (NED)

== Fifth to eighth place classification ==
The points obtained in the preliminary round against the other team were carried over.

=== Pool C ===
Pos	Team	Pld	W	D	L	GF	GA	GD	Pts
5	Belgium	3	3	0	0	19	3	+16	9
6	England	3	2	0	1	13	2	+11	6
7	Poland	3	1	0	2	2	12	−10	3
8	Austria	3	0	0	3	1	18	−17	0

Source: FIH
Rules for classification: 1) points; 2) matches won; 3) goal difference; 4) goals for; 5) head-to-head result; 6) field goals for.

14 August 2025
12:30

Austria	0–1	Poland
	Report	R. Pawlak 52'

Umpires:
Shane O'Donell (IRL)
Laurine Delforge (BEL)

14 August 2025
14:45

Belgium	2–1	England
Stockbroekx 6'; Boon 48'	Report	Ward 15'

Umpires:
Tim Meissner (GER)
Marcin Grochal (POL)

16 August 2025
10:30

Belgium	7–1	Poland
Stockbroekx 18'; Boon 20', 54'; Hellin 23'; De Kerpel 29'; Onana 38', 47'	Report	Jarzyński 45'

Umpires:
Tim Meissner (GER)
Alex Fedenczuk (SCO)

16 August 2025
12:45

England	7–0	Austria
Wallace 7', 13'; Payton 10'; Hooper 13', 25'; Roper 23'; Ward 59'	Report

Umpires:
Coen van Bunge (NED)
Shane O'Donell (IRL)

== First to fourth place classification ==
=== Bracket ===
Semi-finals
14 August
Netherlands	3
France	1
14 August
Germany	4
Spain	1

Final
16 August
Netherlands	1 (1)
Germany (p.s.o.)	1 (4)
Third place
16 August
France	0
Spain	2

=== Semifinals ===
14 August 2025
17:00

Netherlands	3–1	France
Janssen 2', 57'; Brinkman 31'	Report	Goyet 37'

Umpires:
Magali Sergeant (BEL)
Ben Göntgen (GER)

14 August 2025
20:00

Germany	4–1	Spain
Peillat 1', 56'; M. Grambusch 11'; Prinz 48'	Report	Basterra 27'

Umpires:
Alison Keogh (IRL)
Coen van Bunge (NED)

=== Third place game ===
16 August 2025
15:30

France	0–2	Spain
	Report	Recasens 32'; Álvarez 57'

Umpires:
Paul Walker (ENG)
Sébastien Michielsen (BEL)

=== Final ===
16 August 2025
18:00

Netherlands	1–1	Germany
Reyenga 26'	Report	Weigand 46'
Penalties
Croon (penalty shoot-out missed); Van Dam (penalty shoot-out missed); Brinkman (penalty shoot-out scored); Janssen (penalty shoot-out missed)	1–4	(penalty shoot-out scored) Weigand; (penalty shoot-out scored) Struthoff; (penalty shoot-out scored) Müller; (penalty shoot-out scored) Prinz

Umpires:
Laurine Delforge (BEL)
Alison Keogh (IRL)

== Statistics and awards ==
=== Final standings ===
Pos	Team	Qualification
1st place, gold medalist(s)	Germany (H)	2026 FIH Hockey World Cup
2nd place, silver medalist(s)	Netherlands (Note: Belgium and the Netherlands are already qualified for the 2026 FIH Hockey World Cup as hosts.)	
3rd place, bronze medalist(s)	Spain (Note: Spain is already qualified for the 2026 FIH Hockey World Cup as the highest placed nation of the 2024–25 FIH Pro League.)	
4	France	2026 World Cup Qualifiers
5	Belgium	
6	England	2026 World Cup Qualifiers
7	Poland	2026 World Cup Qualifiers
8	Austria	2026 World Cup Qualifiers

Source: FIH
(H) Host

=== Goalscorers ===
There were 105 goals scored in 20 matches, for an average of 5.25 goals per match.

6 goals

- (Germany) Gonzalo Peillat

5 goals

- (Belgium) Tom Boon
- (Netherlands) Jip Janssen

4 goals

- (France) Victor Charlet
- (Germany) Justus Weigand

3 goals

- (Belgium) Nicolas De Kerpel
- (Belgium) Nelson Onana
- (Belgium) Thibeau Stockbroekx
- (England) Sam Ward
- (Germany) Raphael Hartkopf
- (Germany) Thies Prinz
- (Netherlands) Koen Bijen
- (Spain) Nicolás Álvarez
- (Spain) José Basterra

2 goals

- (Belgium) Guillaume Hellin
- (Belgium) Alexander Hendrickx
- (England) Sam Hooper
- (England) Jacob Payton
- (England) Phil Roper
- (England) Stuart Rushmere
- (England) Zachary Wallace
- (France) Timothée Clément
- (Germany) Mats Grambusch
- (Netherlands) Thierry Brinkman
- (Netherlands) Tjep Hoedemakers
- (Netherlands) Terrance Pieters
- (Poland) Gracjan Jarzyński
- (Spain) Pol Cabré-Verdiell
- (Spain) Gerard Clapés

1 goal

- (Austria) Josef Winkler
- (Belgium) Roman Duvekot
- (Belgium) Antoine Kina
- (Belgium) Maxime Van Oost
- (Belgium) Arthur De Sloover
- (England) James Gall
- (England) David Goodfield
- (England) Tom Sorsby
- (France) Amaury Bellenger
- (France) Mattéo Desgouillons
- (France) Xavier Esmenjaud
- (France) François Goyet
- (France) Corentin Sellier
- (Germany) Malte Hellwig
- (Netherlands) Floris Middendorp
- (Netherlands) Tijmen Reyenga
- (Poland) Tomasz Bembenek
- (Poland) Robert Pawlak
- (Poland) Wojciech Rutkowski
- (Spain) Alejandro Alonso
- (Spain) Pepe Cunill
- (Spain) Bruno Font
- (Spain) Marc Recasens
- (Spain) Marc Reyné

Source: FIH

=== Awards ===
The following awards were given at the conclusion of the tournament.

Award	Player
Player of the tournament	(Germany) Mats Grambusch
Goalkeeper of the tournament	(France) Corentin Saunier
Young player of the tournament	(France) Malo Martinache

== See also ==
- 2025 Women's EuroHockey Championship
- 2025 Men's EuroHockey Championship II
