= Koen Bijen =

Dutch field hockey player

Personal information
- Born: 27 July 1998 (age 28) Leiden, Netherlands

Sport
- Sport: Field hockey
- Position: Forward
- Club: Den Bosch
Youth career
- Team
- –: HDM
Senior career
Years	Team	Caps	Goals
–2017	HDM	-	-
2017–2020	Klein Zwitserland	-	-
2020–present	Den Bosch	-	-
National team
Years	Team	Caps	Goals
2019	Netherlands U21	10	(3)
2021–present	Netherlands	43	(22)
Medal record
Men's field hockey
Representing the Netherlands
Olympic Games
Gold medal – first place	2024 Paris	Team
FIH Hockey World Cup
Bronze medal – third place	2023 Bhubaneswar–Rourkela
EuroHockey Championship
Gold medal – first place	2023 Mönchengladbach
Silver medal – second place	2025 Mönchengladbach
EuroHockey Junior Championship
Bronze medal – third place	2019 Valencia

Koen Bijen (born 27 July 1998) is a Dutch professional field hockey player who plays as a forward for Hoofdklasse club Den Bosch and the Dutch national team.

== Club career ==
Bijen first played football when he was young but after nine years of playing football he switched to hockey and joined HDM. When HDM in 2017 was promoted to the Hoofdklasse, he was deemed not good enough and he left HDM for Klein Zwitserland. He currently plays for Den Bosch who he joined in 2020.

== International career ==
=== Under–21 ===
In 2019 Bijen made his debut for the national junior team during an eight-nations tournament in Madrid. He went on to represent the team at the EuroHockey Junior Championship in Valencia later that year, winning a bronze medal.

=== Oranje ===
Koen Bijen made his senior debut for the Oranje in 26 November 2021 during season three of the FIH Pro League.

He was officially named in the national senior squad in 2022.

== Honours ==
Den Bosch

- Gold Cup: 2022–23

Netherlands

- EuroHockey Championship: 2023
- FIH Pro League: 2021–22, 2022–23
