= Amaury Bellenger =

French field hockey player

Personal information
- Born: 14 August 1998 (age 28)
- Height: 185 cm (6 ft 1 in)
- Weight: 77 kg (170 lb)

Sport
- Sport: Field hockey
- Position: Defender / Midfielder
- Club: Uccle Sport
Youth career
- Team
- –: Amiens
Senior career
Years	Team	Caps	Goals
–2016	Amiens	-	-
2016–2020	Racing Club de France	-	-
2020–2022	Orée	-	-
2022–present	Uccle Sport	-	-
National team
Years	Team	Caps	Goals
2017	France U21	5	(0)
2017–present	France	57	(3)

Amaury Bellenger (born 14 August 1998) is a French field hockey player who plays as a defender or midfielder for Belgian Hockey League club Uccle Sport and the French national team.

== Club career ==
Bellenger first played for Amiens before he joined Racing Club de France in 2016. In 2020 he left France to play in Belgium for Orée. After two seasons at Orée he left them for another Brussels club Uccle Sport.

== International career ==
=== Under–21 ===
Amaury Bellenger made his debut for the French U–21 team in 2017 at the EuroHockey Junior Championship II in Saint Petersburg.

=== Les Bleus ===
Bellenger also made his debut for Les Bleus in 2017 during a test series against Germany in Hamburg.

He has since gone on to win a gold medal in the 2018–19 FIH Hockey Series in Le Touquet. He was most recently names in the national squad for season three of the FIH Pro League.
