= Thies Prinz =

German field hockey player (born 1998)

Personal information
- Full name: Thies Ole Prinz
- Born: 7 July 1998 (age 28) Berlin, Germany

Sport
- Sport: Field hockey
- Position: Forward
- Club: Rot Weiss-Köln
National team
Years	Team	Caps	Goals
2016–2019	Germany U–21	51	(23)
2017–	Germany	25	(4)
Medal record
Men's field hockey
Representing Germany
Olympic Games
Silver medal – second place	2024 Paris	Team
World Cup
Gold medal – first place	2023 Bhubaneswar/Rourkela
Gold medal – first place	2026 Wavre/Amstelveen
EuroHockey Championships
Gold medal – first place	2025 Mönchengladbach
FIH Junior World Cup
Bronze medal – third place	2016 Lucknow
EuroHockey Junior Championship
Gold medal – first place	2019 Valencia
Bronze medal – third place	2017 Valencia

Thies Ole Prinz (born 7 July 1998) is a German field hockey player.

== Personal life ==
Thies Prinz was born and raised in Berlin, Germany.

== Career ==
=== Club level ===
In club competition, Prinz plays for Rot Weiss-Köln in the German Bundesliga.

=== Junior national team ===
Thies Prinz made his debut for the German U–21 team in 2016. His first appearance was during a four-nations series in Valencia. Later that year he went on to represent the team at the FIH Junior World Cup in Lucknow, winning a bronze medal.

In 2017, he won a second bronze medal with the junior team at the EuroHockey Junior Championship in Valencia.

His final year with the team was 2019. He made multiple appearances throughout the year, competing in numerous test matches and at an eight-nations tournament in Madrid. He finished his junior career on a high, winning gold at the EuroHockey Junior Championship in Valencia.

=== Die Honamas ===
Prinz made his debut for Die Honamas in 2017, during a three-nations tournament in Moers.

He competed in the first season of the FIH Pro League.

Following the retirements of senior players following the 2020 Summer Olympics, Prinz was officially added to the national squad.
