= Rafael Vilallonga =

Spanish field hockey player (born 2001)

Personal information
- Born: 28 November 2001 (age 24)

Sport
- Sport: Field hockey
Medal record
World Cup
Silver medal – second place	2026 Wavre/Amstelveen

Rafael Vilallonga (born 28 November 2001) is a Spanish field hockey player. He represented Spain at the 2024 Summer Olympics.
