= Thibeau Stockbroekx =

Belgian field hockey player

Personal information
- Born: 20 July 2000 (age 26)

Sport
- Sport: Field hockey
- Position: Forward
- Club: Braxgata
Youth career
- Team
- –: Antwerp
Senior career
Years	Team	Caps	Goals
–2019	Antwerp	-	-
2019–2025	Oranje-Rood	-	-
2025–present	Braxgata	-	-
National team
Years	Team	Caps	Goals
2019–2021	Belgium U21	16	(6)
2019–present	Belgium	65	(26)
- Updated on 16 August 2025

Thibeau Stockbroekx (born 20 July 2000) is a Belgian field hockey player who plays as a forward for Braxgata and the Belgium national team.

== Personal life ==
Thibeau Stockbroekx is the cousin of Emmanuel Stockbroekx, who also plays in the Belgian national team. He also has an older brother, Gregory, who represented Belgium in junior competition.

== Club career ==
Stockbroekx came through the youth ranks of Antwerp and played for their first team until 2019 when he moved to the Netherlands to play for Oranje-Rood. He returned to Belgium in 2025 and signed for Braxgata.

== International career ==
=== Under–21 ===
In 2019 Stockbroekx made his debut for the Belgium U–21 team during an eight–nations tournament in Madrid, winning a bronze medal. Later that year he went on to represent the team again at the EuroHockey Junior Championship in Valencia where the team finished 5th. He was a member of the junior team at the 2021 Men's FIH Junior World Cup in Bhubaneswar.

=== Red Lions ===
Prior to making his junior debut, Stockbroekx earned his first senior cap in a 2019 test match against Russia. He went on to appear in the team once more that year. In 2020 he represented the team again during season two of the FIH Pro League. He followed this up in 2021 with his first inclusion in the Red Lions squad.
