= Justus Weigand =

German field hockey player

Personal information
- Born: 20 April 2000 (age 26) Nuremberg, Germany
- Height: 1.86 m (6 ft 1 in)
- Weight: 85 kg (187 lb)

Sport
- Sport: Field hockey
- Position: Forward
- Club: Mannheimer HC
National team
Years	Team	Caps	Goals
2019	Germany U21	9	(10)
2020–present	Germany	66	(21)
Medal record
Men's field hockey
Representing Germany
Olympic Games
Silver medal – second place	2024 Paris	Team
World Cup
Gold medal – first place	2023 Bhubaneswar/Rourkela
Gold medal – first place	2026 Wavre/Amstelveen
EuroHockey Championships
Gold medal – first place	2025 Mönchengladbach
Silver medal – second place	2021 Amstelveen
Euro Junior Championship
Gold medal – first place	2019 Valencia
- Updated on 12:23, 24 June 2025 (UTC)

Justus Weigand is a German field hockey player who plays as a forward for Mannheimer HC and the Germany national team.
