= 2021 Men's FIH Hockey Junior World Cup squads =

This article lists the confirmed squads for the 2021 Men's FIH Hockey Junior World Cup tournament held in Bhubaneswar, India between 24 November and 5 December 2021. The 16 national teams were required to register a playing squad of up to 18 players. Players born on or after 1 January 2000 were eligible to compete in the tournament.

A flag is included for coaches that are of a different nationality than their own national team. Those marked in bold have been capped at full international level.

== Pool A ==
=== Belgium ===
Head coach: Jeroen Baart

The final squad was announced on 21 October 2021.

No.	Pos.	Player	Date of birth (age)	Caps	Club
1	GK	Boris Feldheim	1 April 2002 (aged 19)	0	(Belgium) Daring
2	GK	Pierre De Gratie	31 May 2001 (aged 20)	0	(Belgium) Beerschot
3	FW	**Thibeau Stockbroekx**	20 July 2000 (aged 21)	10	(Netherlands) Oranje-Rood
4	MF	Guillermo Hainaut	8 June 2002 (aged 19)	0	(Belgium) Uccle Sport
5	DF	Rik Van Cleynenbreugel	21 April 2000 (aged 21)	0	(Belgium) Braxgata
6	FW	**Dylan Englebert** (Captain)	20 April 2000 (aged 21)	9	(Belgium) Léopold
7	DF	Thibault Deplus	23 January 2001 (aged 20)	0	(Belgium) Gantoise
8	MF	Arno Van Dessel	3 July 2003 (aged 18)	0	(Belgium) Herakles
9	MF	Louis de Backer	27 February 2002 (aged 19)	0	(Belgium) Waterloo Ducks
10	FW	Jeremy Wilbers	6 November 2001 (aged 20)	0	(Belgium) Waterloo Ducks
12	MF	Emmanuel Cockelaere	7 February 2000 (aged 21)	0	(Belgium) Pingouin
13	FW	**Roman Duvekot**	21 June 2000 (aged 21)	10	(Belgium) Beerschot
14	MF	**Tobias Biekens**	2 January 2001 (aged 20)	9	(Belgium) Braxgata
16	DF	Augustin Raemdonck	9 December 2001 (aged 19)	0	(Belgium) Orée
17	DF	Sebastiaan Geers	19 March 2001 (aged 20)	0	(Belgium) Dragons
18	MF	Lucas Putters	25 January 2002 (aged 19)	0	(Belgium) Dragons
20	FW	Jeff De Winter	3 July 2000 (aged 21)	0	(Belgium) Antwerp
22	FW	**Nelson Onana**	1 March 2000 (aged 21)	3	(Belgium) Braxgata

=== Chile ===
Head coach: (Argentina) Alejandro Gomez

The final squad was announced on 16 November 2021.

No.	Pos.	Player	Date of birth (age)	Caps	Club
2	DF	**Agustín Amoroso**	9 December 2000 (aged 20)	0	(Chile) Prince of Wales Country Club
3		Joaquin Acevedo	14 May 2002 (aged 19)	0	
4	MF	Alexei De Witt	23 June 2003 (aged 18)	0	(Chile) Manquehue
5	DF	**Agustín Valenzuela**	30 September 2000 (aged 21)	0	(Chile) Prince of Wales Country Club
6	MF	**Daniel Beroggi**	9 January 2001 (aged 20)	0	(Netherlands) Almere
7	FW	Fernando Izurieta	28 June 2001 (aged 20)	0	(Chile) Manquehue
9	FW	**Benjamín Koster**	14 November 2000 (aged 21)	0	(Chile) Manquehue
10	FW	Raimundo Valenzuela	10 May 2002 (aged 19)	0	(Netherlands) Almere
11		José Renz	26 June 2002 (aged 19)	0	
12	GK	Pedro Hernández	14 March 2001 (aged 20)	0	(Chile) Prince of Wales Country Club
13	FW	Francisco Valdivia	13 July 2001 (aged 20)	0	(Chile) Manquehue
14	FW	Francisco Cerda	20 June 2002 (aged 19)	0	(Chile) Universidad Católica
16	FW	Juan Palmes	7 March 2000 (aged 21)	0	(Chile) Prince of Wales Country Club
17		Sebastian Alarcón	25 January 2001 (aged 20)	0	
19	GK	Julián Villanueva	24 June 2002 (aged 19)	0	(Chile) Prince of Wales Country Club
20	DF	Nicolás Abujatum (Captain)	1 September 2000 (aged 21)	0	(Chile) Manquehue
22	DF	**Sebastián Wolansky**	11 March 2003 (aged 18)	0	(Chile) Manquehue
23	FW	Álvaro García	3 December 2001 (aged 19)	0	(Chile) Manquehue

=== Malaysia ===
Head coach: Wallace Tan

The final squad was announced on 5 November 2021.

No.	Pos.	Player	Date of birth (age)	Caps	Club
1	GK	Hamiz Ahir	5 February 2000 (aged 21)	0	(Malaysia) TNB Thunderbolts
3	MF	Alfarico Liau	18 February 2002 (aged 19)	0	(Malaysia) Maybank
4	MF	Faris Harizan	27 November 2002 (aged 18)	0	(Malaysia) TNB Thunderbolts
7	FW	Muhibddin Moharam	27 May 2000 (aged 21)	6	(Malaysia) Tenaga Nasional Berhad
8	DF	Syarman Mat	15 July 2001 (aged 20)	12	(Malaysia) Terengganu
9	DF	Kamarulzaman Kamaruddin	25 October 2000 (aged 21)	0	(Malaysia) Maybank
10	FW	**Akhimullah Anuar** (Captain)	2 May 2000 (aged 21)	15	(Malaysia) Terengganu
12	FW	Abid Sufian Mat Ruslee	12 June 2000 (aged 21)	0	
13	FW	Muhajir Abdu	6 April 2000 (aged 21)	12	(Malaysia) Tenaga Nasional Berhad
14		Muhammad Khalid	21 April 2001 (aged 20)	6	(Malaysia) TNB Thunderbolts
15	FW	Muhammad Mamat	1 July 2003 (aged 18)	6	
16	GK	Shahrul Saupi	25 June 2001 (aged 20)	2	
18	DF	**Arif Ishak**	22 January 2000 (aged 21)	13	(Malaysia) Terengganu
19	DF	Amirul Azahar	5 May 2000 (aged 21)	11	
20	FW	Shamir Shamsul	10 May 2002 (aged 19)	0	(Malaysia) Tenaga Nasional Berhad
22	MF	Syawal Abd Razak	16 December 2001 (aged 19)	0	(Malaysia) Tenaga Nasional Berhad
23	MF	Pavandip Gurdip	21 March 2000 (aged 21)	0	(Malaysia) UniKL
27	DF	Zulfitri Zin	4 January 2000 (aged 21)	0	
30	FW	**Firadus Rosdi**	4 October 2000 (aged 21)	0	(Malaysia) Terengganu

=== South Africa ===
Head coach: Siphesihle 'Sihle' Ntuli

The final squad was announced on 26 October 2021.

No.	Pos.	Player	Date of birth (age)	Caps	Club
1	GK	Taine Bird	17 July 2000 (aged 21)	0	(South Africa) Varsity College
2		Niel Raath	9 February 2001 (aged 20)	0	(South Africa) Maties
4		Guy Morgan (Captain)	11 April 2000 (aged 21)	0	(South Africa) Tuks
5		Senzwesihle Ngubane	5 August 2001 (aged 20)	0	(South Africa) Tuks
6		Cody Posthumus	27 April 2000 (aged 21)	0	(South Africa) Tuks
7		Peter Jarvis	22 April 2000 (aged 21)	0	(South Africa) Maties
8		Jacques van Tonder	11 April 2000 (aged 21)	0	(South Africa) Maties
9		Cameron le Forestier	4 September 2002 (aged 19)	0	(South Africa) Tuks
10		Trevor de Lora	21 March 2000 (aged 21)	0	(South Africa) Tuks
12		Marvin Simons	3 December 2001 (aged 19)	0	
13		Matt Dewar	26 August 2000 (aged 21)	0	(South Africa) Tuks
14		Jared Campbell	24 March 2000 (aged 21)	0	(South Africa) Tuks
15		Aiden Tun	27 September 2001 (aged 20)	0	(South Africa) Maties
17	MF	Luke Wynford	4 April 2000 (aged 21)	0	(South Africa) Ikeys
19		Idrees Abdulla	10 October 2000 (aged 21)	0	(South Africa) Ikeys
21		Zenani Kraai	4 November 2000 (aged 21)	0	
25	GK	Sihle Ngcongo	15 May 2001 (aged 20)	0	(South Africa) Tuks
28		Joshua Davies	28 February 2001 (aged 20)	0	(South Africa) Tuks

== Pool B ==
=== Canada ===
Head coach: Indy Sehmbi

The final squad was announced on 29 October 2021.

No.	Pos.	Player	Date of birth (age)	Caps	Club
2	FW	Flynn McCulloch	23 December 2000 (aged 20)	0	
3	DF	Alexander Bird	13 May 2003 (aged 18)	0	
4	DF	Roopkanwar Dhillon	5 October 2001 (aged 20)	0	
6	DF	Avjot Buttar	24 September 2001 (aged 20)	0	
7	FW	Sean Davis	15 July 2000 (aged 21)	0	
8	DF	Nic Syrros	28 February 2003 (aged 18)	0	
10	FW	Naman Sharma	25 November 2000 (aged 20)	0	
11	MF	Chris Tardif	3 August 2000 (aged 21)	0	
13	FW	John Jacoby	2 November 2001 (aged 20)	0	
14	MF	Julius D'Souza	2 July 2002 (aged 19)	0	
16	MF	Ganga Singh	1 April 2000 (aged 21)	0	
17	DF	Aaron Foong	27 June 2001 (aged 20)	0	
18	MF	Rowan Childs	8 April 2000 (aged 21)	5	
21	MF	Mankirat Singh	15 May 2001 (aged 20)	0	
22	MF	Jyoth Sidhu	19 July 2002 (aged 19)	0	
23	DF	Manveer Jhamat	14 November 2001 (aged 20)	0	
24	MF	Bhavdeep Dhaliwal	18 May 2001 (aged 20)	0	
25	GK	**Zackary Coombs**	24 April 2001 (aged 20)	0	
27	FW	Tanvir Kang	4 March 2000 (aged 21)	0	
30	GK	Daniel Goodwin	26 August 2001 (aged 20)	0	

=== France ===
Head coach: Aymeric Bergamo

The final squad was announced on 9 November 2021.

No.	Pos.	Player	Date of birth (age)	Caps	Club
1	MF	Lucas Montecot	4 September 2001 (aged 20)	0	(France) Montrouge
3	DF	**Mattéo Desgouillons**	21 January 2000 (aged 21)	5	(Belgium) Gantoise
4	DF	Brieuc Delemazure	2 April 2002 (aged 19)	0	(France) Lille
5	MF	**Stanislas Branicki**	9 April 2002 (aged 19)	0	(Belgium) Orée
6	FW	**Corentin Sellier**	29 May 2001 (aged 20)	5	(France) Montrouge
7	DF	Mathis Clément	30 August 2002 (aged 19)	5	(France) Montrouge
8	MF	Paul Piot	8 October 2001 (aged 20)	0	(France) Lille
9	FW	Jules Verrier	20 June 2002 (aged 19)	0	(France) Saint Germain
10	MF	**Timothée Clément** (Captain)	8 April 2000 (aged 21)	10	(Belgium) Orée
11	FW	**Benjamin Marqué**	11 August 2000 (aged 21)	10	(Belgium) Daring
12	DF	Gaspard Xavier	10 May 2002 (aged 19)	0	(Belgium) Racing Club de Bruxelles
14	MF	Raïfe Gonessa	27 April 2002 (aged 19)	5	(France) Saint Germain
17	FW	**Antonin Igau**	9 January 2000 (aged 21)	5	(Belgium) Antwerp
19	MF	**Noé Jouin**	2 August 2002 (aged 19)	0	(France) Saint Germain
25	FW	Jules Bournac	10 July 2002 (aged 19)	0	(France) Lille
28	DF	Thomas Assoignon	11 February 2002 (aged 19)	0	Racing Club de France
31	GK	Matthieu Maries	1 December 2001 (aged 19)	0	(France) Stade Français
32	GK	Guillaume de Vaucelles	12 October 2001 (aged 20)	2	(France) Saint Germain

=== India ===
Head coach: (Australia) Graham Reid

The final squad was announced on 11 November 2021.

No.	Pos.	Player	Date of birth (age)	Caps	Club
1	DF	Sharda Nand Tiwari	7 January 2004 (aged 17)	6	(India) Uttar Pradesh Hockey
2	GK	Prashant Chauhan	1 December 2000 (aged 20)	7	(India) Uttar Pradesh Hockey
7	DF	Sanjay	5 May 2001 (aged 20)	17	(India) Hockey Chandigarh
9	FW	Sudeep Chirmako	5 December 2002 (aged 18)	11	(India) Hockey Odisha
11	FW	Dhami Singh	1 July 2002 (aged 19)	0	(India) Hockey Haryana
12	FW	Rahul Kumar Rajbhar	18 December 2000 (aged 20)	11	(India) Services Sports Control Board
13	MF	Maninder Singh	4 February 2001 (aged 20)	17	(India) Hockey Chandigarh
14	MF	Vishnukant Singh	10 August 2002 (aged 19)	17	(India) Uttar Pradesh Hockey
15	MF	Ankit Pal	5 December 2004 (aged 16)	0	(India) Madhya Pradesh Hockey Academy
16	FW	Uttam Singh	10 December 2002 (aged 18)	6	(India) Uttar Pradesh Hockey
17	GK	Pawan	1 May 2001 (aged 20)	7	(India) Hockey Haryana
20	DF	Sunil Jojo	14 December 2002 (aged 18)	0	(India) Hockey Odisha
23	FW	Manjeet	10 October 2001 (aged 20)	0	(India) Services Sports Control Board
29	MF	Rabichandra Moirangthem	3 August 2001 (aged 20)	17	(India) Manipur Hockey
30	DF	Abhisek Lakra	7 February 2000 (aged 21)	0	(India) Hockey Odisha
32	MF	**Vivek Prasad** (Captain)	25 February 2000 (aged 21)	6	(India) BPCL
47	MF	Yashdeep Siwach	26 December 2000 (aged 20)	17	(India) Hockey Haryana
55	MF	Gurmukh Singh	31 January 2001 (aged 20)	0	(India) Hockey Haryana
90	FW	Araijeet Singh Hundal	21 January 2004 (aged 17)	0	(India) Punjab and Sind Bank

=== Poland ===
Head coach: Jacek Adrian

The final squad was announced on 17 November 2021.

No.	Pos.	Player	Date of birth (age)	Caps	Club
1	GK	Jakub Gebler	5 January 2001 (aged 20)	0	(Poland) AZS AWF Poznań
5		Mateusz Wiśniewski	22 February 2002 (aged 19)	0	(Poland) AZS AWF Poznań
6		**Robert Pawlak**	10 May 2003 (aged 18)	0	(Poland) Politechnika Poznańska
7		**Gracjan Jarzyński** (Captain)	1 April 2001 (aged 20)	5	(Germany) Schwarz-Weiß Neuss
8		**Jakub Chumeńczuk**	24 November 2000 (aged 21)	10	(Poland) Grunwald Poznań
9		Maksymilian Pawlak	3 September 2003 (aged 18)	0	(Poland) Start Gniezno
11		**Eryk Bembenek**	25 November 2001 (aged 19)	5	(Poland) Grunwald Poznań
12	GK	Maciej Wieczorek	25 July 2001 (aged 20)	0	(Poland) Warta Poznań
15		Julian Blaszkiewicz	10 August 2003 (aged 18)	0	(England) Woking
17		Michał Kroma	3 September 2000 (aged 21)	0	(Poland) Warta Poznań
18		Dominik Turij	29 December 2002 (aged 18)	0	(Poland) Siemianowiczanka
20		**Szymon Cyprych**	28 August 2003 (aged 18)	0	(Poland) Warta Poznań
23		Jakub Mikołajczak	11 May 2004 (aged 17)	0	(Poland) Swarek Swarzędz
25		Szymon Pilaczyński	3 February 2000 (aged 21)	0	(Poland) AZS AWF Poznań
27		**Michał Lange**	15 October 2000 (aged 21)	0	(Poland) Grunwald Poznań
28		Szymon Tyranowski	3 March 2003 (aged 18)	0	(Poland) Warta Poznań
30		**Tomasz Bembenek**	17 January 2000 (aged 21)	5	(Poland) Pomorzanin Toruń
32		**Wojciech Rutkowski**	27 August 2000 (aged 21)	5	(Poland) Pomorzanin Toruń

== Pool C ==
=== Netherlands ===
Head coach: Michiel van der Struijk

The final squad was announced on 16 November 2021.

No.	Pos.	Player	Date of birth (age)	Caps	Club
1	GK	Flip Wijsman	22 June 2001 (aged 20)	0	(Netherlands) Den Bosch
4	DF	Sheldon Schouten	24 March 2001 (aged 20)	0	(Netherlands) Oranje-Rood
5		Bram van Battum	6 August 2001 (aged 20)	9	(Netherlands) Kampong
7	MF	Floris Middendorp	4 June 2001 (aged 20)	10	(Netherlands) Amsterdam
8		Menno Boeren	12 May 2002 (aged 19)	0	(Netherlands) Rotterdam
9		Casper van der Veen	29 June 2004 (aged 17)	0	(Netherlands) Bloemendaal
10	MF	Silas Lageman (Captain)	6 March 2001 (aged 20)	2	(Netherlands) Kampong
11	FW	Brent van Bijnen	23 July 2001 (aged 20)	5	(Netherlands) Amsterdam
12		Daan Bonhof	12 October 2000 (aged 21)	0	(Netherlands) Pinoké
13	GK	Steven Verhoogt	14 October 2001 (aged 20)	0	(Netherlands) Pinoké
14	FW	Miles Bukkens	15 February 2003 (aged 18)	0	(Netherlands) Pinoké
15		Max de Bie	6 June 2000 (aged 21)	0	(Netherlands) Oranje-Rood
16	FW	Guus Jansen	7 March 2002 (aged 19)	0	(Netherlands) Rotterdam
17		Joppe Stappenbelt	4 December 2001 (aged 19)	0	(Netherlands) Pinoké
20	MF	Luke Dommershuijzen	11 April 2002 (aged 19)	0	(Netherlands) Amsterdam
21	DF	**Justen Blok**	27 September 2000 (aged 21)	0	(Netherlands) Rotterdam
22	FW	David Huussen	7 May 2001 (aged 20)	0	(Netherlands) Klein Zwitserland
23	MF	Ties Klinkhamer	16 April 2000 (aged 21)	10	(Netherlands) SCHC
24		Olivier Hortensius	4 September 2002 (aged 19)	0	(Netherlands) Rotterdam

=== South Korea ===
Head coach: Kim Jong-yi

No.	Pos.	Player	Date of birth (age)	Caps	Club
1	GK	Jang Dae-han	10 October 2002 (aged 19)	0	
3		Ryu Inh-wan	3 November 2001 (aged 20)	0	
4		Hwang Gyu-dong	4 September 2001 (aged 20)	0	
6		Lee Sung-min	25 June 2002 (aged 19)	0	
7		Jeong Jun-seong	21 May 2001 (aged 20)	0	
8		Kong Yoon-ho	15 June 2002 (aged 19)	0	
9		Park Geon-woo	3 September 2002 (aged 19)	0	
10		Yoo Seung-ho	26 March 2002 (aged 19)	0	
11		Chun Sem-in	14 January 2000 (aged 21)	0	
15		Kim Tae-ho	29 February 2000 (aged 21)	0	
16		Hong Jin-young	26 November 2000 (aged 20)	0	
17		Song Hae-seong	21 August 2000 (aged 21)	0	
18		Lee Seung-woo	10 September 2001 (aged 20)	0	
19		Kim Hyun-woo	25 January 2000 (aged 21)	0	
21	GK	Shin Eun-seop	15 October 2001 (aged 20)	0	
23		Bae Soung-min (Captain)	10 February 2000 (aged 21)	0	
30		Choi In-hyeok	4 May 2000 (aged 21)	0	
32		Cheon Min-su	31 July 2000 (aged 21)	0	

=== Spain ===
Head coach: (Argentina) Alejandro Siri

The final squad was announced on 5 November 2021.

No.	Pos.	Player	Date of birth (age)	Caps	Club
1	GK	Francisco Matorras	14 September 2000 (aged 21)	2	(Spain) Tenis
2		Aleix Vericat	18 September 2000 (aged 21)	0	(Spain) CD Terrassa
4		Álvaro Portugal (Captain)	15 July 2000 (aged 21)	0	(Spain) Club de Campo
5		Jordi Bonastre (Captain)	7 August 2000 (aged 21)	8	(Spain) Atlètic Terrassa
7		Rafael Vilallonga	28 November 2001 (aged 19)	0	(Spain) Jolaseta
8		Ignacio Álvarez	1 April 2000 (aged 21)	0	(Spain) Tenis
9		Manuel Rodríguez	1 April 2001 (aged 20)	0	(Spain) Complutense
10		Guillermo Fortuño	1 June 2000 (aged 21)	10	(Spain) Real Club de Polo
11		Gerard Clapés	13 September 2000 (aged 21)	9	(Spain) Club Egara
12		Pol Cabré-Verdiell	22 April 2003 (aged 18)	0	(Spain) Atlètic Terrassa
14		Ignacio Abajo	28 April 2000 (aged 21)	0	(Spain) Club de Campo
18	MF	**Pepe Cunill**	9 July 2001 (aged 20)	0	(Spain) Atlètic Terrassa
19		Xavier Barutell	5 June 2003 (aged 18)	0	(Spain) Atlètic Terrassa
20		Pau Cunill	4 January 2000 (aged 21)	0	(Spain) Atlètic Terrassa
21		Borja Lacalle	21 May 2001 (aged 20)	0	(Spain) Club de Campo
23		Eduard De Ignacio-Simó	3 March 2000 (aged 21)	0	(Spain) CD Terrassa
24		Oriol Bozal	10 July 2002 (aged 19)	0	(Spain) Junior
25	GK	Luis Calzado	15 November 2000 (aged 21)	1	(Spain) Real Club de Polo

=== United States ===
Head coach: Pat Harris

The final squad was announced on 15 October 2021.

No.	Pos.	Player	Date of birth (age)	Caps	Club
3		Luca Civetta	9 August 2005 (aged 16)	0	
4		Dean Schiller	12 April 2001 (aged 20)	6	
6		Henzor Motta	10 May 2000 (aged 21)	0	
7	MF	Finlay Quaile	8 August 2000 (aged 21)	6	(Germany) Düsseldorfer HC
8		Damien Tarala	21 October 2000 (aged 21)	0	
9		Willem Pouw	6 April 2005 (aged 16)	0	
10		Jaden Henry	5 September 2002 (aged 19)	0	
11		Mehtab Grewal	9 January 2005 (aged 16)	0	
12		Tymen Kloen	8 September 2002 (aged 19)	0	
13		**Jatin Sharma** (Captain)	29 August 2001 (aged 20)	0	
14		Tyler Kim	28 March 2005 (aged 16)	0	
15		Wyatt Katz	23 September 2003 (aged 18)	0	
16		Gurcharan Johal	9 November 2004 (aged 17)	0	
18		Leo Baumgardner	19 January 2004 (aged 17)	0	
19		Corey Dykema	11 September 2003 (aged 18)	0	
21		Amrinderpal Singh	24 December 2000 (aged 20)	0	
22		Samuel Zuzick	6 August 2002 (aged 19)	0	
24	GK	Phil Schofield	22 June 2001 (aged 20)	0	
44	GK	Shomik Chakraborty	4 April 2000 (aged 21)	0	

== Pool D ==
=== Argentina ===
Head coach: Lucas Rey

The final squad was announced on 29 October 2021.

No.	Pos.	Player	Date of birth (age)	Caps	Club
1	GK	Nehuen Hernando	23 June 2000 (aged 21)	0	(Argentina) Ducilo
2	DF	Facundo Zárate (Captain)	31 July 2000 (aged 21)	0	(Argentina) Jockey Club Córdoba
3	DF	Bruno Stellato	17 January 2000 (aged 21)	0	(Argentina) Ciudad de Buenos Aires
4	MF	Tadeo Marcucci	3 May 2001 (aged 20)	0	(Argentina) Lomas
5	MF	Joaquín Krüger	29 May 2001 (aged 20)	0	(Belgium) Daring
6	DF	Mateo Fernández	12 July 2002 (aged 19)	0	(Argentina) Banco Provincia
7	FW	Franco Agostini	8 March 2000 (aged 21)	0	(Argentina) Lomas
8	DF	Lautaro Domene	24 July 2001 (aged 20)	0	(Belgium) Ombrage
9	FW	Gaspar Garrone	1 August 2000 (aged 21)	0	(Argentina) Jockey Club Córdoba
10	MF	Ignacio Ibarra	7 May 2000 (aged 21)	0	(Argentina) Ducilo
11	MF	Joaquín Toscani	25 February 2002 (aged 19)	0	(Argentina) Banco Provincia
12	GK	Agustín Cabaña	3 June 2000 (aged 21)	0	(Argentina) Murialdo
13	DF	Tadeo Mahon	21 January 2000 (aged 21)	0	(Argentina) Banco Provincia
14	MF	Ignacio Nardolillo	18 February 2003 (aged 18)	0	(Argentina) San Martín de Tucumán
15	MF	Facundo Sarto	3 November 2000 (aged 21)	0	(Argentina) Ciudad de Buenos Aires
17	FW	Francisco Ruiz	10 October 2001 (aged 20)	0	(Argentina) Mitre
18	FW	Lucio Mendez	20 August 2000 (aged 21)	0	(Argentina) Lomas
20	FW	Bautista Capurro	22 October 2003 (aged 18)	0	(Argentina) Ciudad de Buenos Aires

=== Egypt ===
Head coach: Abu-Talib Magib

No.	Pos.	Player	Date of birth (age)	Caps	Club
1		Abdalla Ali	21 September 2002 (aged 19)	0	
3		Omar Zaki	26 March 2001 (aged 20)	0	
4		Khaled El Gandy	10 February 2001 (aged 20)	0	
5		Youssef Bakr	1 May 2002 (aged 19)	0	
6		Ahmed Abass	1 September 2000 (aged 21)	0	
7		Ahmed Galal	11 January 2000 (aged 21)	0	
9		Hossameldin Ragab (Captain)	23 August 2002 (aged 19)	0	
10		Abdelrahman El Ganayni	1 January 2001 (aged 20)	0	
11		Ziad Adel	19 October 2002 (aged 19)	0	
14		Moustafa Saber	27 March 2000 (aged 21)	0	
15		Hussein Awad	7 December 2002 (aged 18)	0	
16	GK	Mahmoud Hussien	24 June 2002 (aged 19)	0	
17		Mohamed Senousy	20 September 2000 (aged 21)	0	
21		Ahmed Fahmy	3 September 2004 (aged 17)	0	
22		Said Kamal	23 July 2003 (aged 18)	0	
24		Mohamed Hosni	9 February 2003 (aged 18)	0	
27		Saber Taha	26 August 2002 (aged 19)	0	
29	GK	Mahmoud Seleem	10 September 2001 (aged 20)	0	

=== Germany ===
Head coach: Valentin Altenburg

The final squad was announced on 18 October 2021.

No.	Pos.	Player	Date of birth (age)	Caps	Club
1	GK	Jean Danneberg	8 November 2002 (aged 19)	0	(Germany) Mannheimer HC
3	MF	Michel Struthoff	19 April 2003 (aged 18)	0	(Germany) UHC Hamburg
6	MF	Robert Duckscheer	7 July 2000 (aged 21)	0	(Germany) Uhlenhorst Mülheim
7	FW	Masi Pfandt	8 May 2000 (aged 21)	0	(Germany) Harvestehuder THC
8	DF	**Benedikt Schwarzhaupt** (Captain)	14 January 2001 (aged 20)	8	(Germany) UHC Hamburg
9	MF	**Erik Kleinlein**	3 December 2001 (aged 19)	3	(Germany) Mannheimer HC
10	DF	**Christopher Kutter**	22 January 2000 (aged 21)	0	(Germany) UHC Hamburg
11	FW	Paul Smith	21 January 2000 (aged 21)	0	(Germany) Hamburger Polo Club
12	DF	Moritz Ludwig	14 September 2001 (aged 20)	10	(Germany) Uhlenhorst Mülheim
15	MF	Maximilian Siegburg	1 May 2000 (aged 21)	1	(Germany) Rot-Weiss Köln
16	DF	**Antheus Barry**	6 October 2002 (aged 19)	4	(Germany) Rot-Weiss Köln
18	GK	Anton Brinckman	2 April 2000 (aged 21)	7	(Germany) Harvestehuder THC
21	DF	Phillip Holzmüller	13 August 2001 (aged 20)	0	(Germany) Münchner SC
22	MF	Niclas Schippan	1 January 2000 (aged 21)	4	(Germany) Harvestehuder THC
23	MF	**Mario Schachner**	19 September 2001 (aged 20)	10	(Germany) Mannheimer HC
24	FW	Julius Hayner	29 April 2000 (aged 21)	0	(Germany) Düsseldorfer HC
25	FW	**Hannes Müller** (Captain)	18 May 2000 (aged 21)	17	(Germany) UHC Hamburg
26	MF	Aton Flatten	19 August 2002 (aged 19)	9	(Germany) Münchner SC
27	MF	Matteo Poljaric	11 February 2002 (aged 19)	0	(Germany) Berliner HC

=== Pakistan ===
Head coach: Muhammad Danish Kaleem

No.	Pos.	Player	Date of birth (age)	Caps	Club
1	GK	Waqar	20 December 2000 (aged 20)	0	
2		Ahmed Aqeel	25 December 2004 (aged 16)	0	
3		Ali Rizwan	5 January 2000 (aged 21)	0	
5		**Moin Shakeel**	8 June 2000 (aged 21)	0	
6		Adeel Latif	7 August 2000 (aged 21)	0	
7		Muhammad Hammadudin	12 December 2000 (aged 20)	0	
8		**Abdul Rana** (Captain)	4 February 2000 (aged 21)	0	
9		Abdul Shahid	7 September 2005 (aged 16)	0	
10		**Ali Ghazanfar**	27 February 2002 (aged 19)	0	
11		Umair Sattar	10 February 2001 (aged 20)	0	
12	GK	Abdullah Ishtiaq	21 May 2000 (aged 21)	0	
13		Muhib Ullah	31 March 2000 (aged 21)	0	
14		Abuzar	29 September 2003 (aged 18)	0	
15		Mohsin Hassan	8 December 2000 (aged 20)	0	
16		Abdul Manan	4 December 2002 (aged 18)	0	
17		Abdul Rehman	15 February 2004 (aged 17)	0	
18		Rooman Khan	31 March 2001 (aged 20)	0	
19		Muhammad Abdullah	5 November 2002 (aged 19)	0	
