= 2026 Men's FIH Hockey World Cup squads =

Field hockey competition squads

This article lists the confirmed squads for the 2026 Men's FIH Hockey World Cup held in Wavre, Belgium and Amstelveen, Netherlands from 15 to 30 August 2026.

== Pool A ==
=== Argentina ===
The squad was announced on 14 July 2026.

Head coach: Lucas Rey

1. Tomás Santiago (GK)
5. Facundo Zárate
7. Nicolás Keenan
9. Maico Casella (C)
10. Nicolás Della Torre
11. Lucas Toscani
12. Nehuen Hernando (GK)
15. Tomás Ruiz
16. Joaquín Toscani
20. Matías Andreotti
21. Tomás Domene
22. Matías Rey (C)
23. Lucas Martínez
26. Nicolás Cicileo
27. Tadeo Marcucci
28. Ignacio Ibarra
29. Thomas Habif
31. Bautista Capurro
32. Martín Ferreiro
33. Lucio Méndez

=== Japan ===
The squad was announced on 8 July 2026.

Head coach: Yoshihiro Anai

1. Koji Yamazaki
2. Shota Yamada
4. Yamato Kawahara
5. Seren Tanaka
6. Naru Kimura
7. Jun Watanabe
8. Taiki Takade
9. Kosei Kawabe
11. Kazumasa Matsumoto
12. Yuma Nagai
13. Manabu Yamashita
14. Raiki Fujishima (C)
16. Hiro Saito
18. Tsubasa Tanaka
19. Ryoma Ooka
22. Kaito Tanaka
23. Yusuke Kawamura
29. Takumi Kitagawa (GK)
30. Takashi Yoshikawa (GK)
38. Hyota Yamada

=== New Zealand ===
The squad was announced on 7 July 2026.

Head coach: (South Africa) Greg Nicol

1. Dominic Dixon (GK)
2. Scott Boyde
4. Dane Lett
8. Charlie Morrison
12. Sam Lane (C)
13. Simon Yorston
16. Aidan Sarikaya
17. Nic Woods
19. Joseph Morrison
21. Kane Russell
23. Dylan Thomas
25. Bradley Rothwell
30. Finn Ward
32. George Baker
35. Ryan Parr
37. Isaac Houlbrooke
38. Benjamin Culhane
39. James Hickson
40. Matthew Ruetsch (GK)
41. Timothy Neild

=== Netherlands ===
The squad was announced on 28 July 2026.

Head coach: Jeroen Delmée

1. Maurits Visser (GK)
2. Jip Janssen
4. Lars Balk
6. Jonas de Geus
7. Thijs van Dam
8. Thierry Brinkman (C)
9. Koen Bijen
10. Jorrit Croon
11. Terrance Pieters
12. Justen Blok
14. Derck de Vilder
16. Floris Wortelboer
19. Tjep Hoedemakers
20. Derk Meijer (GK)
22. Pepijn van der Heijden
23. Joep de Mol
24. Steijn van Heijningen
29. Tijmen Reyenga
51. Duco Telgenkamp
77. Floris Middendorp

== Pool B ==
=== Belgium ===
The squad was announced on 22 June 2026.

Head coach: (New Zealand) Shane McLeod

1. Simon Vandenbroucke (GK)
4. Arthur Van Doren (C)
5. Arno Van Dessel
6. Lucas Balthazar
7. Thibeau Stockbroekx
9. Maxime Van Oost
11. Tommy Willems
13. Nicolas De Kerpel
16. Alexander Hendrickx
17. Guillaume Hellin
18. Roman Duvekot
19. Hugo Labouchere
21. Vincent Vanasch (GK)
22. Victor Foubert
23. Arthur De Sloover
26. Victor Wegnez
27. Tom Boon
30. Nelson Onana
32. Jack Vloeberghs
37. Thomas Crols

=== France ===
The squad was announced on 3 August 2026.

Head coach: (Belgium) John-John Dohmen

2. Aristide Michaelis
3. Mattéo Desgouillons
4. Brieuc Delemazure
6. Corentin Sellier
7. Lucas Montecot
8. Xavier Esmenjaud
9. Mathis Clément
11. Noé Jouin
12. Gaspard Xavier
13. Benjamin Marqué
14. Malo Martinache
16. François Goyet (C)
17. Florent Vaal
18. Eliot Curty
22. Victor Charlet
23. Marius Clément (GK)
24. Amaury Bellenger
28. Timothée Clément
31. Corentin Saunier (GK)
95. Louis Haertelmeyer

=== Germany ===
The squad was announced on 20 July 2026.

Head coach: André Henning

5. Linus Müller
7. Justus Warweg
8. Benedikt Schwarzhaupt
10. Johannes Große
11. Thies Prinz
13. Paul-Philipp Kaufmann
14. Teo Hinrichs
15. Tom Grambusch (C)
17. Christopher Rühr
19. Justus Weigand
21. Michel Struthoff
22. Hugo von Montgelas
24. Erik Kleinlein
25. Hannes Müller
29. Malte Hellwig
34. Jakob Brilla
38. Antheus Barry
39. Joshua Onyekwue-Nnaji (GK)
44. Moritz Ludwig
74. Jean Danneberg (GK)

=== Malaysia ===
The squad was announced on 27 July 2026.

Head coach: (South Africa) Brendon Carolan

1. Syed Cholan
6. Marhan Jalil (C)
7. Fitri Saari
10. Faizal Saari
11. Akhimullah Anuar
15. Shello Silverius
16. Zaimi Mat Deris (GK)
18. Faiz Jali
20. Ashran Hamsani
21. Hafizuddin Othman (GK)
22. Norsyafiq Sumantri
23. Abu Kamal Azrai
24. Aiman Rozemi
26. Muhajir Abdu Rauf
27. Shafiq Hassan
29. Amirul Azahar
30. Faris Harizan
31. Azimuddin Kamaruddin
32. Aminuddin Mohd Zain
35. Andywalfian Jeffrynus

== Pool C ==
=== Australia ===
The squad was announced on 6 July 2026.

Head coach: Mark Hager

1. Lachlan Sharp
2. Tom Craig
7. Nathan Ephraums
8. Connar Otterbach
9. Liam Henderson
10. Joshua Beltz
12. Jed Snowden (GK)
13. Blake Govers
15. Jayden Atkinson
16. Tim Howard
19. Craig Marais
20. Ky Willott
21. Jack Welch
23. Hayden Beltz
24. Cambell Geddes
26. James Collins
27. Joel Rintala
28. Ash Thomas (GK)
29. Tim Brand
32. Jeremy Hayward

=== Ireland ===
The squad was announced on 4 August 2026.

Head coach: Mark Tumilty

1. Jamie Carr (GK)
2. Luke Roleston (GK)
4. Luke Witherow
8. Jonathan McKee
9. Matthew Nelson
15. Kyle Marshall (C)
17. Sean Murray
18. Mark McNellis
19. Peter McKibbin
20. Jeremy Duncan
24. Benjamin Walker
25. Jonathan Lynch
26. Peter Brown
29. Lee Cole
30. Louis Rowe
36. Samuel Hyland
39. Fergus Gibson
46. Gregory Williams
47. Adam McCallister
49. Alistair Empey

=== South Africa ===
The squad was announced on 11 July 2026.

Head coach: Devon van der Merwe

2. Mustapha Cassiem
3. Andrew Hobson
4. Calvin Davis
5. Senzwesihle Ngubane
6. Jamie Seale
7. Dayaan Cassiem (C)
9. Jared Cass
10. Hans Neethling
11. Tevin Kok
15. Carlon Mentoor
17. Brendan du Toit (GK)
18. Viwe Mbata
20. Luke Wynford
23. Nicholas Spooner
26. Damian Knott
28. Trevor de Lora
29. Samkelo Mvimbi
30. Cullin de Jager (GK)
32. Ayakha Mthalane
47. Kenton Melville

=== Spain ===
The squad was announced on 29 June 2026.

Head coach: (Argentina) Max Caldas

2. Alejandro Alonso
5. Jordi Bonastre
6. Xavier Gispert
7. Rafael Vilallonga
8. Marc Recasens
9. Borja Lacalle
10. José Basterra
11. Gerard Clapés
12. Marc Reyné
14. Marc Miralles (C)
15. Luis Calzado (GK)
16. Rafael Revilla (GK)
17. Pepe Cunill
18. Joaquín Menini
22. Pol Cabré-Verdiell
23. Marc Vizcaíno
26. Bruno Font
28. Nicolás Álvarez
35. Iñaky Zaldúa
62. Ignacio Cobos

== Pool D ==
=== England ===
The squad was announced on 13 July 2026.

Head coach: (Wales) Zak Jones

2. Nick Park
3. Jack Waller
5. Tom Sorsby
7. Zachary Wallace (C)
9. Henry Croft
13. Sam Ward
14. James Albery
15. Phil Roper
16. James Mazarelo (GK)
17. Stuart Rushmere
18. Timothy Nurse
19. David Goodfield
20. Ollie Payne (GK)
23. Nick Bandurak
26. James Gall
27. Liam Sanford
30. Conor Williamson
31. Will Calnan
33. Sam Hooper
47. Ben Fox

=== India ===
The squad was announced on 21 July 2026.

Head coach: (South Africa) Craig Fulton

4. Jarmanpreet Singh
5. Abhishek
7. Manpreet Singh
8. Hardik Singh
9. Dilpreet Singh
11. Mandeep Singh
13. Harmanpreet Singh (C)
17. Sumit Walmiki
18. Nilakanta Sharma
19. Aditya Lalage
27. Mohith Shashikumar (GK)
30. Amit Rohidas
31. Jugraj Singh
32. Vivek Prasad
34. Sukhjeet Singh
47. Yashdeep Siwach
70. Sanjay Rana
77. Suraj Karkera (GK)
78. Rajinder Singh Jr.
99. Shilanand Lakra

=== Pakistan ===
The squad was announced on 4 August 2026.

Head coach: (Netherlands) Bob Veldhof

1. Waqar Ali (GK)
2. Muhammad Abdullah
5. Sufyan Khan
7. Moin Shakeel
8. Waheed Rana
9. Hannan Shahid
10. Zikriya Hayat
11. Arshad Liaqat
13. Adeel Latif
14. Ahmad Nadeem
15. Ghazanfar Ali
16. Ammad Butt
17. Muhammad Hammadudin
18. Abdul Rehman
21. Afraz Hakeem
24. Umar Mustafa
27. Abu Mahmood (C)
31. Ali Raza (GK)
32. Abdul Manan
35. Muhammad Ammad

=== Wales ===
The squad was announced on 22 July 2026.

Head coach: Danny Newcombe

3. Daniel Kyriakides
5. Alf Dinnie
6. Jacob Draper (C)
7. Gareth Griffiths
10. Rhodri Furlong
13. Dale Hutchinson
15. Rhys Bradshaw
16. Sam Welsh
17. Fred Newbold
18. Gareth Furlong
20. Jolyon Morgan
23. Jack Pritchard
24. Hywel Jones
25. Benjamin Francis (C)
29. Jonathan Fleck
30. James Tyson
31. Liam Barker
33. Rhys Payne (GK)
44. Nicholas Morgan
50. Toby Reynolds-Cotterill (GK)
