= 2018 Boys' EuroHockey Youth Championships =

Tournament details
- Host country: Spain
- City: Santander
- Dates: 15–21 July
- Teams: 8 (from 1 confederation)
- Venue(s): Ruth Beitia Sports Complex

Final positions
- Champions: Spain (2nd title)
- Runner-up: Netherlands
- Third place: Germany

Tournament statistics
- Matches played: 20
- Goals scored: 105 (5.25 per match)
- Top scorer(s): (France) Timothée Clément (7 goals)
- Best player: (Netherlands) Brent van Bijnen
- Best goalkeeper: (Germany) Anton Brinckman

The 2018 Boys' EuroHockey Youth Championships was the tenth edition of the Boys' EuroHockey Youth Championships, the biennial international men's under-18 field hockey championship of Europe organized by the European Hockey Federation.

It was held from 15 to 21 July 2018 in Santander, Spain at the Ruth Beitia Sports Complex.

Germany were the two-time defending champions. They did not defend their title as they were defeated in the semi-finals by the Netherlands. The hosts Spain won their second title by defeating the Netherlands 2–1 in the final. Germany won the bronze medal by defeating Belgium 1–0.

== Qualified teams ==
Dates	Event	Location	Quotas	Qualifier(s)
24–30 July 2016	2016 EuroHockey Youth Championships	Cork, Ireland	6	Belgium; England; Germany; Ireland; Netherlands; Spain
24–30 July 2016	2016 EuroHockey Youth Championships II	Glasgow, Scotland	2	France; Poland
Total			8	

== Preliminary round ==
All times are local (UTC+2).

=== Pool A ===
Pos	Team	Pld	W	D	L	GF	GA	GD	Pts	Qualification
1	Germany	3	2	1	0	16	5	+11	7	Semi-finals
2	Spain (H)	3	2	0	1	11	6	+5	6	Semi-finals
3	England	3	1	1	1	11	8	+3	4	
4	Poland	3	0	0	3	2	21	−19	0	

Source: Eurohockey
Rules for classification: 1) points; 2) goal difference; 3) goals scored; 4) head-to-head result.
(H) Hosts

15 July 2018
15:30

England	7–0	Poland
Males 3', 60'; Rushmere 18', 54'; Kentwell 27'; Gravestock 40'; Russell 59'	Report

Umpires:
Simon Olivier (FRA)
Germain Boutte (BEL)

15 July 2018
20:00

Germany	4–1	Spain
Schwarzhaupt 16'; Müller 18'; Schütze 36'; Weigand 50'	Report	Lacalle 14'

Umpires:
Daniel Veerman (NED)
Benjamin Peters (USA)

17 July 2018
13:15

England	3–3	Germany
Rushmere 29', 51'; Males 35'	Report	Schwarzhaupt 7'; Sieburg 13'; Kleinlein 57'

Umpires:
Germain Boutte (BEL)
Daniel Veerman (NED)

17 July 2018
20:00

Spain	5–1	Poland
De Ignacio-Simó 19'; Vall 24'; Lacalle 45'; Abajo 57'; Cunill 60'	Report	Mazurkiewicz 34'

Umpires:
Ian Strange (IRE)
Simon Olivier (FRA)

18 July 2018
17:30

Germany	9–1	Poland
Schwarzhaupt 8', 25', 37'; Kleinlein 12'; Schaefer 20'; Sieburg 26'; Weigand 42'; Mazkour 58'; Kalex 58'	Report	Cholewa 30'

Umpires:
Germain Boutte (BEL)
Ian Strange (IRE)

18 July 2018
20:00

Spain	5–1	England
Cunill 2'; Figa 16', 37'; Vall 18'; Abajo 49'	Report	Males 30'

Umpires:
Benjamin Peters (USA)
Daniel Veerman (NED)

=== Pool B ===
Pos	Team	Pld	W	D	L	GF	GA	GD	Pts	Qualification
1	Belgium	3	2	1	0	16	5	+11	7	Semi-finals
2	Netherlands	3	2	1	0	12	3	+9	7	Semi-finals
3	France	3	1	0	2	5	11	−6	3	
4	Ireland	3	0	0	3	2	16	−14	0	

Source: Eurohockey
Rules for classification: 1) points; 2) goal difference; 3) goals scored; 4) head-to-head result.

15 July 2018
10:00

Netherlands	6–0	Ireland
Van Tongeren 2', 27'; Van Battum 18'; Van de Venne 20'; Charbon 33'	Report

Umpires:
Ole Ingwersen (GER)
Mariusz Orzeł (POL)

15 July 2018
12:15

Belgium	6–2	France
Englebert 4', 47'; Stockbroekx 28', 29'; Blockmans 29'; Van Steerteghem 49'	Report	Sion 36'; Desgouillons 47'

Umpires:
Álvaro López (ESP)
Jake Charles (ENG)

16 July 2018
17:45

Ireland	2–3	France
Ramsay 16'; Kidd 34'	Report	Clément 17', 52'; P. Piot 44'

Umpires:
Mariusz Orzeł (POL)
Jake Charles (ENG)

16 July 2018
20:00

Belgium	3–3	Netherlands
De Paepe 19'; Blockmans 20'; Englebert 51'	Report	Van Bijnen 27'; Van de Venne 31'; Van Tongeren 60'

Umpires:
Benjamin Peters (USA)
Álvaro López (ESP)

18 July 2018
09:45

Netherlands	3–0	France
Middendorp 19'; Van Leur 24'; Van Tongeren 45'	Report

Umpires:
Jake Charles (ENG)
Ole Ingwersen (GER)

18 July 2018
12:00

Ireland	0–7	Belgium
	Report	Duvekot 24'; Englebert 37'; Van Steerteghem 41'; De Winter 48', 49'; Onana 52'; Van Cleynenbreugel 56'

Umpires:
Mariusz Orzeł (POL)
Álvaro López (ESP)

== Fifth to eighth place classification ==
=== Pool C ===
The points obtained in the preliminary round against the other team are taken over.

Pos	Team	Pld	W	D	L	GF	GA	GD	Pts	Relegation
5	England	3	2	0	1	9	1	+8	6	
6	Ireland	3	2	0	1	8	3	+5	6	
7	France (R)	3	2	0	1	9	6	+3	6	EuroHockey Youth Championships II
8	Poland (R)	3	0	0	3	2	18	−16	0	EuroHockey Youth Championships II

Source: Eurohockey
Rules for classification: 1) points; 2) goal difference; 3) goals scored; 4) head-to-head result.
(R) Relegated

20 July 2018
12:30

England	2–0	France
Rushmere 36'; Russell 56'	Report

Umpires:
Ian Strange (IRE)
Germain Boutte (BEL)

20 July 2018
14:45

Poland	0–5	Ireland
	Report	Haycock 2'; Romoli 23', 30'; Empey 26'; Johnson 51'

Umpires:
Simon Olivier (FRA)
Ole Ingwersen (GER)

21 July 2018
12:30

France	6–2	Poland
Clément 6', 21', 52', 56', 59'; Sellier 28'	Report	Nowakowski 20'; Wiśniewski 57'

Umpires:
Ole Ingwersen (GER)
Germain Boutte (BEL)

21 July 2018
14:45

England	0–1	Ireland
	Report	Kidd 9'

Umpires:
Daniel Veerman (NED)
Mariusz Orzeł (POL)

== First to fourth place classification ==
=== Bracket ===
Semi-finals
20 July
Belgium	2 (0)
Spain (s.o.)	2 (3)
20 July
Germany	3 (3)
Netherlands (s.o.)	3 (5)

Final
21 July
Spain	2
Netherlands	1
Third place
21 July
Belgium	0
Germany	1

=== Semi-finals ===
20 July 2018
17:00

Belgium	2–2	Spain
Englebert 28'; De Winter 44'	Report	Bonastre 11'; Figa 43'
Penalties
Stockbroekx (penalty shoot-out missed); Englebert (penalty shoot-out missed); Blockmans (penalty shoot-out missed)	0–3	(penalty shoot-out scored) Abajo; (penalty shoot-out scored) Clapés; (penalty shoot-out scored) Portugal

Umpires:
Jake Charles (ENG)
Daniel Veerman (NED)

20 July 2018
19:30

Germany	3–3	Netherlands
Mazkour 6'; Weigand 33'; Schwarzhaupt 38'	Report	Van Bijnen 11', 52'; Van Tongeren 53'
Penalties
Müller (penalty shoot-out scored); Weigand (penalty shoot-out scored); Sieburg (penalty shoot-out missed); Kleinlein (penalty shoot-out scored)	3–5	(penalty shoot-out scored) Lageman; (penalty shoot-out scored) Middendorp; (penalty shoot-out scored) Van Tongeren; (penalty shoot-out scored) Doeser; (penalty shoot-out scored) Van de Venne

Umpires:
Álvaro López (ESP)
Benjamin Peters (USA)

=== Third and fourth place ===
21 July 2018
14:30

Belgium	0–1	Germany
	Report	Sieburg 38'

Umpires:
Álvaro López (ESP)
Simon Olivier (FRA)

=== Final ===
21 July 2018
20:45

Spain	2–1	Netherlands
Lacalle 20'; Abajo 60'	Report	Van de Venne 13'

Umpires:
Benjamin Peters (USA)
Jake Charles (ENG)

== Statistics ==
=== Final standings ===
Pos	Team	Relegation
1st place, gold medalist(s)	Spain (H)	
2nd place, silver medalist(s)	Netherlands	
3rd place, bronze medalist(s)	Germany	
4	Belgium	
5	England	
6	Ireland	
7	France (R)	EuroHockey Youth Championships II
8	Poland (R)	EuroHockey Youth Championships II

Source: EHF
(H) Host; (R) Relegated

=== Goalscorers ===
There were 105 goals scored in 20 matches, for an average of 5.25 goals per match.

7 goals

- (France) Timothée Clément

6 goals

- (Germany) Benedikt Schwarzhaupt

5 goals

- (Belgium) Dylan Englebert
- (England) Stuart Rushmere
- (Netherlands) Olivier van Tongeren

4 goals

- (England) Morgan Males

3 goals

- (Belgium) Jeff de Winter
- (Germany) Justus Weigand
- (Germany) Maximilien Sieburg
- (Netherlands) Brent van Bijnen
- (Netherlands) Jim van de Venne
- (Spain) Ignacio Abajo
- (Spain) Roger Figa
- (Spain) Borja Lacalle

2 goals

- (Belgium) Jonathan Blockmans
- (Belgium) Leon van Steerteghem
- (Belgium) Thibeau Stockbroekx
- (England) Thomas Russell
- (Germany) Erik Kleinlein
- (Germany) Elian Mazkour
- (Ireland) Oliver Kidd
- (Ireland) Matteo Romoli
- (Spain) Josep Cunill
- (Spain) Jan Vall

1 goal

- (Belgium) Rik van Cleynenbreugel
- (Belgium) Roman Duvekot
- (Belgium) Nelson Onana
- (Belgium) Elias de Paepe
- (England) Joshua Gravestock
- (England) Stuart Kentwell
- (France) Mattéo Desgouillons
- (France) Paul Piot
- (France) Corentin Sellier
- (France) Bastien Sion
- (Germany) Xaver Kalex
- (Germany) Hannes Müller
- (Germany) Emil Schaefer
- (Germany) Mario Schütze
- (Ireland) Alistair Empey
- (Ireland) Jack Haycock
- (Ireland) Benjamin Johnson
- (Ireland) Ewan Ramsay
- (Netherlands) Bram van Battum
- (Netherlands) Valentijn Charbon
- (Netherlands) Nick Doeser
- (Netherlands) Laurens van Leur
- (Netherlands) Floris Middendorp
- (Poland) Jakub Cholewa
- (Poland) Jakub Mazurkiewicz
- (Poland) Michał Nowakowski
- (Poland) Jerzy Wiśniewski
- (Spain) Jordi Bonastre
- (Spain) Eduard de Ignacio-Simó

Source: EHF
