= Kraai =

Kraai is a surname. Notable people with the surname include:

- Jesse Kraai (born 1972), American chess grandmaster
- Zenani Kraai (born 2000), South African field hockey player
