= Field hockey at the 2018 INAS European Championship Games =

Field Hockey at the 2018 INAS European Championship Games
Tournament details
- Host country: France
- City: Paris
- Dates: 17–18 July 2018
- Teams: 5
- Venue: CA Montrouge

Final positions
- Champions: Italy (1st title)
- Runner-up: Portugal
- Third place: Spain

Tournament statistics
- Matches played: 14
- Goals scored: 111 (7.93 per match)
- Top scorer: (Italy) Renzo Ferrazzi (13 goals)

The Field Hockey at the 2018 INAS European Championship Games was the 1st edition of the 2018 INAS European Championship Games. It took place from the 17th until the 18th of July 2018 in Paris, France.

== Qualified teams ==
- France
- Italy
- Netherlands
- Portugal
- Spain

== Format ==
The five teams will be put in one group and each team will play the other four teams. The top two teams advance to the final to determine the winner. The bottom three teams play in a new group for the bronze medal. The teams are mixed with boys and girls. Each game lasts for 30 min, with each game consisting of two halves each lasting 15 minutes.

== Results ==
All times are local (UTC+2).

=== Preliminary round ===
==== Pool A ====
Pos	Team	Pld	W	D	L	GF	GA	GD	Pts	Qualification
1	Italy	4	4	0	0	29	2	+27	12	Final
2	Portugal	4	3	0	1	18	6	+12	9	Final
3	Spain	4	2	0	2	15	13	+2	6	Bronze pool
4	Netherlands	4	1	0	3	13	20	−7	3	Bronze pool
5	France	4	0	0	4	2	36	−34	0	Bronze pool

Updated to match(es) played on 17 July 2018. Source: FIH
Rules for classification: 1) points; 2) goal difference; 3) goals scored; 4) head-to-head result.

17 July 2018
09:30

Italy	5–0	Portugal
Colasanti 7'; Ferrazzi 8', 22'; Ciccazzo 11'; Pasquali 15+'	Report

Umpires:
Jacques Desroussen (FRA)
Paul Kan-Siary (FRA)

17 July 2018
09:30

Spain	3–2	Netherlands
Casasola 7'; Galindo 22', 29'	Report	Rutger Cambier 12'; Wesseling 26'

Umpires:
Sergio De Oliveira (FRA)
Guillaume Tlili (FRA)

17 July 2018
10:30

France	0–11	Spain
	Report	Casanova 2'; Galindo 4', 9', 29'; Casasola 7'; Villacorta 8', 14'; Molina 12', 16', 22'; Corzo 14'

Umpires:
Grégory Redding (FRA)
Jan Bachelet (FRA)

17 July 2018
11:30

Portugal	8—1	France
Capela 1'; Freitas 3', 4', 10', 12', 14'; Cardoso 5', 28'	Report	Michaud 20'

Umpires:
Grégory Redding (FRA)
Paul Kan-Siary (FRA)

17 July 2018
11:30

Netherlands	0–10	Italy
	Report	Ferrazzi 3', 7', 20'; Lecis 5'; Casile 11'; Volpi 12'; Ciccazzo 13'; Pasquali 24', 26', 27'

Umpires:
Jacques Desroussen (FRA)
Jan Bachelet (FRA)

17 July 2018
13:15

France	0—11	Netherlands
	Report	Vis 2', 6', 11', 20', 25'; Hoek 8', 28'; Schotman 9'; Charlotte Cambier 17'; Wessling 24' van Velthoven 29'

Umpires:
Jacques Desroussen (FRA)
Paul Kan-Siary (FRA)

17 July 2018
13:15

Spain	1—8	Italy
Corzo 11'	Report	Lecis 4'; Ferrazzi 4', 8'; Ciccazzo 15', 24'; Colasanti 19'; Pasquali 23', 30+'

Umpires:
Grégory Redding (FRA)
Sergio De Oliveira (FRA)

17 July 2018
14:00

Netherlands	0—7	Portugal
	Report	Freitas 1'; Cardoso 8', 27'; Renato Oliveira 13', 23'; Pereira 16'; Capela 21'

Umpires:
Jan Bachelet (FRA)
Grégory Redding (FRA)

17 July 2018
14:45

Italy	6–1	France
Colasanti 4', 20'; Casile 10', 12', 27'; Ferrazzi 22'	Report	Seva 18'

Umpires:
Sergio De Oliveira (FRA)
Guillaume Tlili (FRA)

17 July 2018
14:45

Spain	0–3	Portugal
	Report	Pereira 2'; Sa 3', 28'

Umpires:
Jan Bachelet (FRA)
Jacques Desroussen (FRA)

=== Third to Fifth place classification ===
==== Bronze Pool ====
The points obtained in the preliminary round against the other team are taken over.

Pos	Team	Pld	W	D	L	GF	GA	GD	Pts
1	Spain	2	2	0	0	13	2	+11	6
2	Netherlands	2	1	0	1	12	3	+9	3
3	France	2	0	0	2	0	20	−20	0

Updated to match(es) played on 18 July 2018. Source: FIH
Rules for classification: 1) points; 2) goal difference; 3) goals scored; 4) head-to-head result.

18 July 2018
09:15

Spain	10–0	France
Molina 2', 7'; Galindo 3', 6', 15', 21', 23'; Vazquez 19', 27'; Corzo 29'	Report

Umpires:
Jacques Desroussen (FRA)
Paul Kan-Siary (FRA)

18 July 2018
10:15

France	0–10	Netherlands
	Report	Hoek 6', 9', 17'; Vis 10', 12', 24'; De Koning 14'; Schotman 27'; Charlotte Cambier 30'; Rutger Cambier 30'

Umpires:
Gauillaume Tlili (FRA)
Paul Kan-Siary (FRA)

18 July 2018
11:15

Netherlands	2–3	Spain
Hoek 7'; Rutger Cambier 20'	Report	Galindo 16', 26'; Corzo 17'

Umpires:
Jacques Desroussen (FRA)
Grégory Redding (FRA)

==== Final ====
18 July 2018
12:00

Italy	8–1	Portugal
Ferrazzi 7', 12', 13', 17', 25'; Colasanti 8'; Pasquali 16'; Casile 30'	Report	Freitas 21'

Umpires:
Sergio de Oliveria (FRA)
Jan Bachelet (FRA)

== Final standings ==
Rank	Team
Gold medal	Italy
Silver medal	Portugal
Bronze medal	Spain
4	Netherlands
5	France
