= Zenani =

Zenani is an isiXhosa, Unisex given name. Notable people with this name include the following:

- Zenani Mandela-Dlamini (b. 1959), South African diplomat and traditional aristocrat
- Zenani Mnguni (b. 1931), a retired South African politician
- Zenani Kraai (b. 2000), South African field hockey player
