= 2021 Men's FIH Hockey Junior World Cup =

12th edition of the Men's FIH Hockey Junior World Cup

Tournament details
- Host country: India
- City: Bhubaneswar
- Dates: 24 November – 5 December
- Teams: 16 (from 4 confederations)
- Venue: Kalinga Hockey Stadium

Final positions
- Champions: Argentina (2nd title)
- Runner-up: Germany
- Third place: France

Tournament statistics
- Matches played: 48
- Goals scored: 327 (6.81 per match)
- Top scorer: (Netherlands) Miles Bukkens (18 goals)
- Best player: (France) Timothée Clément
- Best goalkeeper: (Germany) Anton Brinckman
- Fair play award: Chile

The 2021 Men's FIH Hockey Junior World Cup was the 12th edition of the Men's FIH Hockey Junior World Cup, the biennial men's under-21 field hockey world championship organized by the International Hockey Federation. It was held at the Kalinga Hockey Stadium in Bhubaneswar, India from 24 November to 5 December 2021.

The hosts India were the defending champions but lost to Germany in the semifinals. Argentina won their second title by defeating Germany in the final.

== Qualification ==
A total of 16 teams qualified for the final tournament. In addition to India, who qualified automatically as hosts, 12 other teams qualified from five separate continental competitions and another 3 won wildcards after withdraws.

Dates	Event	Location	Quotas	Qualifier(s)
15–21 July 2019	2019 EuroHockey Junior Championship	Valencia, Spain	5	Belgium; ~~England~~ (Note: England withdrew on 5 October 2021.); France; Germany; Netherlands; Spain
17 February 2020	Host	—N/a	1	India
Cancelled (Note: Due to the COVID-19 pandemic, the African Hockey Federation had decided to cancel the 2021 Men's Junior Africa cup for Nations and 2021 Women's Junior Africa cup for Nations. Thus AfHF designed a system to 2016 Junior Cup.)	2021 Junior Africa Cup	Windhoek, Namibia	2	Egypt; South Africa
Cancelled (Note: Due to the COVID-19 pandemic, the Asian Hockey Federation had decided to cancel the 2021 Men's Hockey Junior Asia Cup and 2021 Women's Hockey Junior Asia Cup. Thus AHF designed a system to decide who earns the quota place for Asia. Where in the end Pakistan, Malaysia, and South Korea were awarded the three quota places for the men's tournament.)	2021 Junior Asia Cup	Dhaka, Bangladesh	3	Pakistan; Malaysia; South Korea
21–28 August 2021	2021 Junior Pan American Championship	Santiago, Chile	2	Argentina; Chile
Cancelled (Note: Due to the COVID-19 pandemic, Australia and New Zealand decided to cancel the 2021 Junior Oceania Cup. The FIH replaced them with Canada and the United States.)	2021 Junior Oceania Cup	—N/a	0	~~Australia~~; ~~New Zealand~~
23 September 2021	Wild card	—N/a	3	Canada; Poland; United States
Total			16	

== Umpires ==
The following 14 umpires were selected on 23 September 2021 by the FIH:

- Dan Barstow (ENG)
- Michael Dutrieux (BEL)
- Alex Fedenczuk (SCO)
- Federico García (URU)
- Antonio Ilgrande (ITA)
- Deepak Joshi (IND)
- Peter Kabaso (KEN)
- Ilanggo Kanabathu (MAS)
- Hideki Kinoshita (JPN)
- Tyler Klenk (CAN)
- Eric Koh (MAS)
- Sean Rapaport (RSA)
- Paul van den Assum (NED)
- Paul Walker (ENG)

== Squads ==
Players born on or after 1 January 2000 were eligible to compete in the tournament. Each team had to name a squad of up to 18 players.

== Preliminary round ==
All times are local (UTC+5:30).

=== Pool A ===
Pos	Team	Pld	W	D	L	GF	GA	GD	Pts	Qualification
1	Belgium	3	2	1	0	9	2	+7	7	Quarter-finals
2	Malaysia	3	2	1	0	7	5	+2	7	Quarter-finals
3	South Africa	3	1	0	2	9	10	−1	3	
4	Chile	3	0	0	3	2	10	−8	0	

Source: FIH
Rules for classification: 1) points; 2) matches won; 3) goal difference; 4) goals for; 5) head-to-head result; 6) field goals scored.

24 November 2021
09:30

Belgium	5–1	South Africa
Duvekot 7', 45'; Onana 24'; Van Dessel 55'; Van Cleynenbreugel 58'	Report	Van Tonder 15+'

Umpires:
Dan Barstow (ENG)
Paul van den Assum (NED)

24 November 2021
17:00

Malaysia	2–1	Chile
Kamaruddin 34'; Mat 43'	Report	Wolansky 59'

Umpires:
Tyler Klenk (CAN)
Antonio Ilgrande (ITA)

26 November 2021
09:30

South Africa	5–1	Chile
Abdulla 7'; Jarvis 36'; Le Forestier 42', 59'; Van Tonder 45'	Report	Amoroso 38'

Umpires:
Paul van den Assum (NED)
Hideki Kinoshita (JPN)

26 November 2021
19:30

Malaysia	1–1	Belgium
Azahar 29'	Report	Stockbroekx 49'

Umpires:
Deepak Joshi (IND)
Paul Walker (ENG)

27 November 2021
14:30

South Africa	3–4	Malaysia
Morgan 34'; Campbell 48', 54'	Report	Khalid 29'; Kamaruddin 41'; Shamsul 49'; Anuar 56'

Umpires:
Michael Dutrieux (BEL)
Federico García (URU)

27 November 2021
17:00

Belgium	3–0	Chile
Putters 2'; Stockbroekx 27'; Onana 48'	Report

Umpires:
Eric Koh (MAS)
Ilanggo Kanabathu (MAS)

=== Pool B ===
Pos	Team	Pld	W	D	L	GF	GA	GD	Pts	Qualification
1	France	3	3	0	0	23	6	+17	9	Quarter-finals
2	India (H)	3	2	0	1	25	8	+17	6	Quarter-finals
3	Poland	3	1	0	2	4	15	−11	3	
4	Canada	3	0	0	3	2	25	−23	0	

Source: FIH
Rules for classification: 1) points; 2) matches won; 3) goal difference; 4) goals for; 5) head-to-head result; 6) field goals scored.
(H) Hosts

24 November 2021
14:30

Canada	0–1	Poland
	Report	E. Bembenek 34'

Umpires:
Ilanggo Kanabathu (MAS)
Peter Kabaso (KEN)

24 November 2021
20:00

India	4–5	France
Uttam 10'; Sanjay 15+', 57', 58'	Report	T. Clément 1', 23', 32'; Marqué 7'; Sellier 57'

Umpires:
Eric Koh (MAS)
Paul Walker (ENG)

25 November 2021
17:00

France	7–1	Poland
Igau 1'; T. Clément 3', 36'; Sellier 11', 27', 34'; Bournac 54'	Report	Jarzyński 22'

Umpires:
Antonio Ilgrande (ITA)
Hideki Kinoshita (JPN)

25 November 2021
19:30

Canada	1–13	India
Tardif 30'	Report	Uttam 6', 47'; Vivek 8'; Sanjay 17', 32', 59'; Maninder 27'; Sharda Nand 35', 53'; Araijeet 40', 50', 51'; Abhisek 55'

Umpires:
Dan Barstow (ENG)
Sean Rapaport (RSA)

27 November 2021
12:00

France	11–1	Canada
T. Clément 6', 34', 58'; Igau 11', 28'; Gonessa 20'; Sellier 26'; Bournac 33'; Jouin 40', 46'; Verrier 43'	Report	Davis 48'

Umpires:
Peter Kabaso (KEN)
Paul van den Assum (NED)

27 November 2021
19:30

India	8–2	Poland
Sanjay 4', 58'; Araijeet 8', 60'; Sudeep 24', 40'; Uttam 34'; Sharda Nand 38'	Report	Rutkowski 50'; R. Pawlak 54'

Umpires:
Alex Fedenczuk (SCO)
Antonio Ilgrande (ITA)

=== Pool C ===
Pos	Team	Pld	W	D	L	GF	GA	GD	Pts	Qualification
1	Netherlands	3	3	0	0	29	7	+22	9	Quarter-finals
2	Spain	3	2	0	1	28	3	+25	6	Quarter-finals
3	South Korea	3	1	0	2	10	22	−12	3	
4	United States	3	0	0	3	1	36	−35	0	

Source: FIH
Rules for classification: 1) points; 2) matches won; 3) goal difference; 4) goals for; 5) head-to-head result; 6) field goals scored.

25 November 2021
12:00

Netherlands	12–5	South Korea
Schouten 10'; Bukkens 13', 16', 36', 58', 60'; Van der Veen 18', 26', 53'; Hortensius 21'; Van Bijnen 35', 49'	Report	Jeong 7', 14', 48'; Yoo 41'; Kim H. 54'

Umpires:
Federico García (URU)
Alex Fedenczuk (SCO)

25 November 2021
14:30

Spain	17–0	United States
Clapés 6', 14', 29', 30'; Rodríguez 7', 15'; Pe. Cunill 9', 29'; Vilallonga 13'; De Ignacio-Simó 26', 31', 37'; Cabre-Verdiell 46'; Pa. Cunill 46'; Bonastre 56'; Fortuño 60', 60'	Report

Umpires:
Eric Koh (MAS)
Deepak Joshi (IND)

26 November 2021
12:00

South Korea	5–1	United States
Lee Se. 4'; Jeong 12'; Hwang 27'; Kim T. 36', 39'	Report	Katz 37'

Umpires:
Michael Dutrieux (BEL)
Peter Kabaso (KEN)

26 November 2021
14:30

Spain	2–3	Netherlands
Lacalle 38'; Pa. Cunill 45'	Report	Schouten 9'; Jansen 27'; Bukkens 59'

Umpires:
Tyler Klenk (CAN)
Sean Rapaport (RSA)

28 November 2021
12:00

South Korea	0–9	Spain
	Report	Fortuño 8'; Pe. Cunill 19', 40'; De Ignacio-Simó 24'; Abajo 35', 44'; Vilallonga 51'; Pa. Cunill 55', 58'

Umpires:
Eric Koh (MAS)
Dan Barstow (ENG)

28 November 2021
14:30

Netherlands	14–0	United States
Van der Veen 6'; Bukkens 11', 12', 31', 33', 51'; Van Bijnen 14', 25', 44'; Dommershuijzen 16', 33', 57'; Hortensius 31'; Boeren 35'	Report

Umpires:
Antonio Ilgrande (ITA)
Ilanggo Kanabathu (MAS)

=== Pool D ===
Pos	Team	Pld	W	D	L	GF	GA	GD	Pts	Qualification
1	Germany	3	3	0	0	19	4	+15	9	Quarter-finals
2	Argentina	3	2	0	1	20	6	+14	6	Quarter-finals
3	Pakistan	3	1	0	2	8	10	−2	3	
4	Egypt	3	0	0	3	1	28	−27	0	

Source: FIH
Rules for classification: 1) points; 2) matches won; 3) goal difference; 4) goals for; 5) head-to-head result; 6) field goals scored.

24 November 2021
12:00

Germany	5–2	Pakistan
Struthoff 1'; Duckscheer 14', 54'; Siegburg 19'; Schwarzhaupt 22'	Report	Shahid 18'; Hammadudin 49'

Umpires:
Sean Rapaport (RSA)
Federico García (URU)

25 November 2021
09:30

Argentina	14–0	Egypt
Zárate 3', 47', 58'; Ruíz 10'; Domene 12', 58'; Capurro 22', 44'; Agostini 25'; Nardolillo 39'; Méndez 46'; Krüger 47'; Stellato 48'; Toscani 51'	Report

Umpires:
Ilanggo Kanabathu (MAS)
Michael Dutrieux (BEL)

26 November 2021
17:00

Argentina	2–3	Germany
Stellato 38'; Agostini 54'	Report	Poljaric 11'; Schwarzhaupt 32'; Müller 44'

Umpires:
Alex Fedenczuk (SCO)
Dan Barstow (ENG)

27 November 2021
09:30

Pakistan	3–1	Egypt
R. Ali 19', 32', 53'	Report	Awad 22'

Umpires:
Hideki Kinoshita (JPN)
Paul Walker (ENG)

28 November 2021
17:00

Pakistan	3–4	Argentina
Rana 17'; R. Ali 28'; Aqeel 53'	Report	Capurro 10'; Nardolillo 20'; Ruíz 30'; Ibarra 47'

Umpires:
Paul van den Assum (NED)
Sean Rapaport (RSA)

28 November 2021
19:30

Germany	11–0	Egypt
Schwarzhaupt 9', 19'; Kutter 11'; Smith 16'; Pfandt 20', 30'; Poljaric 22', 58'; Barry 38'; Struthoff 44', 49'	Report

Umpires:
Deepak Joshi (IND)
Tyler Klenk (CAN)

== Classification round ==
=== Bracket ===
Placement
30 November
South Africa	7
Canada	3
30 November
Pakistan	18
United States	2
30 November
Poland	2
Chile	1
30 November
South Korea (p.s.o.)	3 (6)
Egypt	3 (5)

Cross-overs
2 December
South Africa (p.s.o.)	3 (4)
Pakistan	3 (1)
2 December
Poland	2
South Korea	3

Ninth place
4 December
South Africa	4
South Korea	0
Eleventh place
4 December
Pakistan	5
Poland	0

=== Placement finals ===
30 November 2021
10:30

South Africa	7–3	Canada
Le Forestier 16', 31', 35'; Abdulla 26'; Morgan 28', 48'; De Lora 48'	Report	McCulloch 50'; Davis 55'; Bird 58'

Umpires:
Michael Dutrieux (BEL)
Antonio Ilgrande (ITA)

30 November 2021
13:30

Pakistan	18–2	United States
Abuzar 14', 28', 57'; R. Ali 20', 46'; Sattar 23'; R. Khan 24'; Rehman 27'; Rana 27', 33', 35', 54'; Shakeel 36'; Manan 37'; Hassan 39'; G. Ali 42'; Ullah 43'; Hammadudin 56'	Report	Quaile 30', 40'

Umpires:
Paul Walker (ENG)
Tyler Klenk (CAN)

30 November 2021
16:30

Poland	2–1	Chile
Blaszkiewicz 22'; T. Bembenek 60'	Report	Beroggi 9'

Umpires:
Deepak Joshi (IND)
Peter Kabaso (KEN)

30 November 2021
19:30

South Korea	3–3	Egypt
Kim H. 18'; Jeong 20', 58'	Report	El-Ganayni 42', 54'; Ragab 46'
Penalties
Bae (penalty shoot-out scored); Yoo (penalty shoot-out scored); Cheon (penalty shoot-out scored); Lee (penalty shoot-out missed); Song (penalty shoot-out missed); Bae (penalty shoot-out scored); Cheon (penalty shoot-out scored); Yoo (penalty shoot-out scored)	6–5	(penalty shoot-out scored) El-Ganayni; (penalty shoot-out scored) El-Gandy; (penalty shoot-out missed) Adel; (penalty shoot-out scored) Ragab; (penalty shoot-out missed) Galal; (penalty shoot-out scored) El-Ganayni; (penalty shoot-out scored) El-Gandy; (penalty shoot-out missed) Ragab

Umpires:
Federico García (URU)
Hideki Kinoshita (JPN)

=== Thirteenth to sixteenth place classification ===
Cross-overs
2 December
Canada	4
United States	0
2 December
Chile	1
Egypt	0

Thirteenth place
4 December
Canada	2
Chile	1
Fifteenth place
4 December
United States (p.s.o.)	2 (3)
Egypt	2 (0)

==== Cross-overs ====
2 December 2021
10:30

Canada	4–0	United States
Tardif 20'; Bird 25', 52'; McCulloch 38'	Report

Umpires:
Hideki Kinoshita (JPN)
Antonio Ilgrande (ITA)

2 December 2021
13:30

Chile	1–0	Egypt
R. Valenzuela 46'	Report

Umpires:
Alex Fedenczuk (SCO)
Michael Dutrieux (BEL)

==== Fifteenth and sixteenth place ====
4 December 2021
10:30

United States	2–2	Egypt
Kloen 53', 60'	Report	El-Ganayni 1', 24'
Penalties
Kloen (penalty shoot-out scored); Quaile (penalty shoot-out scored); Sharma (penalty shoot-out scored)	3–0	(penalty shoot-out missed) El-Ganayni; (penalty shoot-out missed) El-Gandy; (penalty shoot-out missed) Adel

Umpires:
Deepak Joshi (IND)
Hideki Kinoshita (JPN)

==== Thirteenth and fourteenth place ====
4 December 2021
13:30

Canada	2–1	Chile
Jacoby 40'; Kang 52'	Report	Amoroso 57'

Umpires:
Peter Kabaso (KEN)
Paul Walker (ENG)

=== Ninth to twelfth place classification ===
==== Cross-overs ====
2 December 2021
16:30

South Africa	3–3	Pakistan
Ngubane 32'; Morgan 37'; Abdulla 38'	Report	Abuzar 5'; Shahid 25'; Rehman 37'
Penalties
Le Forestier (penalty shoot-out scored); De Lora (penalty shoot-out scored); Simons (penalty shoot-out scored); Ngubane (penalty shoot-out scored)	4–1	(penalty shoot-out missed) Shakeel; (penalty shoot-out scored) Latif; (penalty shoot-out missed) Rana

Umpires:
Deepak Joshi (IND)
Paul van den Assum (NED)

2 December 2021
19:30

Poland	2–3	South Korea
Rutkowski 21', 26'	Report	Hong 12'; Kim H. 27', 33'

Umpires:
Ilanggo Kanabathu (MAS)
Peter Kabaso (KEN)

==== Eleventh and twelfth place ====
4 December 2021
16:30

Pakistan	5–0	Poland
R. Ali 2', 6'; Shakeel 22'; Rana 30'; Hammadudin 43'	Report

Umpires:
Michael Dutrieux (BEL)
Antonio Ilgrande (ITA)

==== Ninth and tenth place ====
4 December 2021
19:30

South Africa	4–0	South Korea
Morgan 35', 47'; De Lora 47'; Kraai 53'	Report

Umpires:
Tyler Klenk (CAN)
Alex Fedenczuk (SCO)

== Medal round ==
=== Bracket ===
Quarter-finals
1 December
Belgium	0
India	1
1 December
Germany (p.s.o.)	2 (3)
Spain	2 (1)
1 December
France	4
Malaysia	0
1 December
Netherlands	1
Argentina	2

Semi-finals
3 December
India	2
Germany	4
3 December
France	0 (1)
Argentina (p.s.o.)	0 (3)

Final
5 December
Germany	2
Argentina	4
Third place
5 December
India	1
France	3

=== Quarter-finals ===
1 December 2021
10:30

Germany	2–2	Spain
Kutter 5'; Pfandt 60'	Report	Abajo 11'; De Ignacio-Simó 59'
Penalties
Struthoff (penalty shoot-out scored); Müller (penalty shoot-out scored); Poljaric (penalty shoot-out missed); Smith (penalty shoot-out scored)	3–1	(penalty shoot-out missed) De Ignacio-Simó; (penalty shoot-out missed) Abajo; (penalty shoot-out scored) Clapés; (penalty shoot-out missed) Fortuño

Umpires:
Paul Walker (ENG)
Alex Fedenczuk (SCO)

1 December 2021
13:30

Netherlands	1–2	Argentina
Bukkens 25'	Report	Krüger 24'; Agostini 59'

Umpires:
Federico García (URU)
Dan Barstow (ENG)

1 December 2021
16:30

France	4–0	Malaysia
T. Clément 14', 24', 60'; M. Clément 31'	Report

Umpires:
Tyler Klenk (CAN)
Paul van den Assum (NED)

1 December 2021
19:30

Belgium	0–1	India
	Report	Sharda Nand 21'

Umpires:
Eric Koh (MAS)
Sean Rapaport (RSA)

=== Fifth to eighth place classification ===
Cross-overs
3 December
Belgium (p.s.o.)	2 (4)
Spain	2 (3)
3 December
Malaysia	3
Netherlands	9

Fifth place
5 December
Belgium	4
Netherlands	6
Seventh place
5 December
Spain	4
Malaysia	1

==== Cross-overs ====
3 December 2021
10:30

Belgium	2–2	Spain
Wilbers 33'; Stockbroekx 56'	Report	Pa. Cunill 4', 24'
Penalties
Dukevot (penalty shoot-out scored); Stockbroekx (penalty shoot-out scored); Biekens (penalty shoot-out scored); Wilbers (penalty shoot-out scored)	4–3	(penalty shoot-out scored) Vilallonga; (penalty shoot-out missed) Rodríguez; (penalty shoot-out scored) Clapes; (penalty shoot-out scored) Abajo; (penalty shoot-out missed) Lacalle

Umpires:
Tyler Klenk (CAN)
Alex Fedenczuk (SCO)

3 December 2021
13:30

Malaysia	3–9	Netherlands
Khalid 41'; Anuar 59'; Rosdi 60'	Report	Bukkens 3', 38', 60'; Dommershuijzen 4', 14', 34'; De Bie 37'; Huussen 51', 57'

Umpires:
Paul Walker (ENG)
Deepak Joshi (IND)

==== Seventh and eighth place ====
5 December 2021
10:30

Spain	4–1	Malaysia
De Ignacio-Simó 7'; Pa. Cunill 49', 58'; Pe. Cunill 55'	Report	Anuar 4'

Umpires:
Michael Dutrieux (BEL)
Paul van den Assum (NED)

==== Fifth and sixth place ====
5 December 2021
13:30

Belgium	4–6	Netherlands
Deplus 25'; Duvekot 36', 38'; De Winter 52'	Report	Bukkens 8', 20', 27'; Van Bijnen 15'; Jansen 39'; Van der Veen 50'

Umpires:
Federico García (URU)
Sean Rapaport (RSA)

=== First to fourth place classification ===
==== Semi-finals ====
3 December 2021
16:30

France	0–0	Argentina
	Report
Penalties
Igau (penalty shoot-out missed); T. Clément (penalty shoot-out scored); Sellier (penalty shoot-out missed); Montecot (penalty shoot-out missed)	1–3	(penalty shoot-out scored) Méndez; (penalty shoot-out missed) Zárate; (penalty shoot-out scored) Capurro; (penalty shoot-out scored) Agostini

Umpires:
Federico García (URU)
Sean Rapaport (RSA)

3 December 2021
19:30

India	2–4	Germany
Sudeep 25'; Boby 60'	Report	Kleinlein 15'; Holzmüller 21'; Müller 24'; Kutter 25'

Umpires:
Eric Koh (MAS)
Dan Barstow (ENG)

==== Third and fourth place ====
5 December 2021
16:30

India	1–3	France
Sudeep 42'	Report	T. Clément 26', 34', 47'

Umpires:
Tyler Klenk (CAN)
Paul Walker (ENG)

==== Final ====
5 December 2021
19:30

Germany	2–4	Argentina
Hayner 36'; Pfandt 47'	Report	Domene 10', 25', 50'; Agostini 60'

Umpires:
Eric Koh (MAS)
Dan Barstow (ENG)

== Final standings ==
Pos	Grp	Team	Pld	W	D	L	GF	GA	GD	Pts	Final result
1	D	Argentina	6	4	1	1	26	9	+17	13	Gold medal
2	D	Germany	6	4	1	1	27	12	+15	13	Silver medal
3	B	France	6	5	1	0	30	7	+23	16	Bronze medal
4	B	India (H)	6	3	0	3	29	15	+14	9	
5	C	Netherlands	6	5	0	1	45	16	+29	15	Losing quarter-finalists
6	A	Belgium	6	2	2	2	15	11	+4	8	Losing quarter-finalists
7	C	Spain	6	3	2	1	36	8	+28	11	Losing quarter-finalists
8	A	Malaysia	6	2	1	3	11	22	−11	7	Losing quarter-finalists
9	A	South Africa	6	3	1	2	23	16	+7	10	Crossover winners
10	C	South Korea	6	2	1	3	16	31	−15	7	Crossover winners
11	D	Pakistan	6	3	1	2	34	15	+19	10	Crossover winners
12	B	Poland	6	2	0	4	8	24	−16	6	Crossover winners
13	B	Canada	6	2	0	4	11	33	−22	6	Crossover losers
14	A	Chile	6	1	0	5	5	14	−9	3	Crossover losers
15	C	United States	6	0	1	5	5	60	−55	1	Crossover losers
16	D	Egypt	6	0	2	4	6	34	−28	2	Crossover losers

Source: FIH
(H) Hosts

== Awards ==
The following awards were given at the conclusion of the tournament.

Award	Player
Player of the tournament	(France) Timothée Clément
Goalkeeper of the tournament	(Germany) Anton Brinckman
Top goalscorer	(Netherlands) Miles Bukkens
Fair play award	Chile
Odisha Fans Choice Award for Best Goal of the Tournament	(Argentina) Ignacio Nardolillo
Hockey India Maximum Team Goals	Netherlands
Hockey India Best Goal Saved of the Tournament	(Egypt) Mahmoud Seleem
AM/NS India Best Coach of the Tournament	(Germany) Johannes Schmitz

== Goalscorers ==
There were 327 goals scored in 48 matches, for an average of 6.81 goals per match.

18 goals

- (Netherlands) Miles Bukkens

14 goals

- (France) Timothée Clément

8 goals

- (India) Sanjay
- (Pakistan) Rizwan Ali
- (Spain) Pau Cunill

6 goals

- (Netherlands) Brent van Bijnen
- (Netherlands) Luke Dommershuijzen
- (Pakistan) Waheed Rana
- (South Africa) Guy Morgan
- (South Korea) Jeong Jun-seong
- (Spain) Eduard de Ignacio-Simó

5 goals

- (Argentina) Lautaro Domene
- (France) Corentin Sellier
- (India) Araijeet Singh Hundal
- (Netherlands) Casper van der Veen
- (South Africa) Cameron Le Forestier
- (Spain) Pepe Cunill

4 goals

- (Argentina) Franco Agostini
- (Belgium) Roman Duvekot
- (Egypt) Abdelrahman El-Ganayni
- (Germany) Masi Pfandt
- (Germany) Benedikt Schwarzhaupt
- (India) Sudeep Chirmako
- (India) Uttam Singh
- (India) Sharda Nand Tiwari
- (Pakistan) Abuzar
- (South Korea) Kim Hyun-woo
- (Spain) Gerard Clapés

3 goals

- (Argentina) Bautista Capurro
- (Argentina) Facundo Zárate
- (Belgium) Thibeau Stockbroekx
- (Canada) Alexander Bird
- (France) Antonin Igau
- (Germany) Christopher Kutter
- (Germany) Matteo Poljaric
- (Germany) Michel Struthoff
- (Malaysia) Akhimullah Anuar
- (Pakistan) Muhammad Hammadudin
- (Poland) Wojciech Rutkowski
- (South Africa) Idrees Abdulla
- (Spain) Ignacio Abajo
- (Spain) Guillermo Fortuño

2 goals

- (Argentina) Joaquín Krüger
- (Argentina) Ignacio Nardolillo
- (Argentina) Francisco Ruíz
- (Argentina) Bruno Stellato
- (Belgium) Nelson Onana
- (Canada) Sean Davis
- (Canada) Flynn McCulloch
- (Canada) Chris Tardif
- (Chile) Agustín Amoroso
- (France) Jules Bournac
- (France) Noé Jouin
- (Germany) Robert Duckscheer
- (Germany) Hannes Müller
- (Malaysia) Kamarulzaman Kamaruddin
- (Malaysia) Muhammad Khalid
- (Malaysia) Firadus Rosdi
- (Netherlands) Olivier Hortensius
- (Netherlands) Davis Huussen
- (Netherlands) Guus Jansen
- (Netherlands) Sheldon Schouten
- (Pakistan) Hannan Shahid
- (Pakistan) Moin Shakeel
- (South Africa) Jared Campbell
- (South Africa) Trevor de Lora
- (South Africa) Jacques van Tonder
- (South Korea) Kim Tae-ho
- (Spain) Manuel Rodríguez
- (Spain) Rafael Vilallonga
- (United States) Tymen Kloen
- (United States) Finlay Quaile

1 goal

- (Argentina) Ignacio Ibarra
- (Argentina) Lucio Méndez
- (Argentina) Joaquín Toscani
- (Belgium) Jeff De Winter
- (Belgium) Thibault Deplus
- (Belgium) Lucas Putters
- (Belgium) Rik Van Cleynenbreugel
- (Belgium) Arno Van Dessel
- (Belgium) Jeremy Wilbers
- (Canada) John Jacoby
- (Canada) Tanvir Kang
- (Chile) Daniel Beroggi
- (Chile) Raimundo Valenzuela
- (Chile) Sebastián Wolansky
- (Egypt) Hussein Awad
- (Egypt) Hossameldin Ragab
- (France) Mathis Clément
- (France) Raïfe Gonessa
- (France) Benjamin Marqué
- (France) Jules Verrier
- (Germany) Antheus Barry
- (Germany) Julius Hayner
- (Germany) Phillip Holzmüller
- (Germany) Erik Kleinlein
- (Germany) Maximilian Siegburg
- (Germany) Paul Smith
- (India) Abhisek Lakra
- (India) Vivek Prasad
- (India) Boby Singh Dhami
- (India) Maninder Singh
- (Malaysia) Amirul Azahar
- (Malaysia) Syarman Mat
- (Malaysia) Shamir Shamsul
- (Netherlands) Max de Bie
- (Netherlands) Menno Boeren
- (Pakistan) Ahmed Aqeel
- (Pakistan) Ghazanfar Ali
- (Pakistan) Mohsin Hassan
- (Pakistan) Rooman Khan
- (Pakistan) Abdul Manan
- (Pakistan) Abdul Rehman
- (Pakistan) Umair Sattar
- (Pakistan) Muhib Ullah
- (Poland) Eryk Bembenek
- (Poland) Tomasz Bembenek
- (Poland) Julian Blaszkiewicz
- (Poland) Gracjan Jarzyński
- (Poland) Robert Pawlak
- (South Africa) Peter Jarvis
- (South Africa) Zenani Kraai
- (South Africa) Senzwesihle Ngubane
- (South Korea) Hong Jin-young
- (South Korea) Hwang Gyu-dong
- (South Korea) Lee Seung-woo
- (South Korea) Yoo Seung-ho
- (Spain) Jordi Bonastre
- (Spain) Pol Cabre-Verdiell
- (Spain) Borja Lacalle
- (United States) Wyatt Katz

Source: FIH

== See also ==
- 2022 Women's FIH Hockey Junior World Cup
