= Lucio Méndez =

Argentine field hockey player

Personal information
- Full name: Lucio Méndez Pin
- Born: 20 August 2000 (age 26) Buenos Aires, Argentina

Sport
- Sport: Field hockey
- Position: Forward
National team
Years	Team	Caps	Goals
2020–2021	Argentina U–21	6	(1)
2023–	Argentina	23	(6)
Medal record
Men's field hockey
Representing Argentina
World Cup
Bronze medal – third place	2026 Wavre/Amstelveen
Pan American Cup
Gold medal – first place	2025 Montevideo	Team
FIH Junior World Cup
Gold medal – first place	2021 Bhubaneswar	Team

Lucio Méndez Pin (born 20 August 2000) is an international field hockey player from Argentina.

== Career ==
=== Domestic ===
Méndez currently competes in the Carlsberg 0.0 Hockey League for Royal Orée.

=== Under–21 ===
Méndez made his international debut for Argentina at under–21 level. He made his first appearances for the junior national team in 2021. He was a member of the gold medal-winning squad at the FIH Junior World Cup in Bhubaneswar.

=== Los Leones ===
In 2023, Méndez received his first call-up to Los Leones. He was a member of the squad that toured Europe during the fourth season of the FIH Pro League. He earned his first senior international cap during a match against India in Eindhoven.

Since his debut, he has made more appearances for the national team during the fifth and sixth seasons of the FIH Pro League.

He was named in the squad for the 2025 Pan American Cup in Montevideo. At the tournament he scored three goals, helping Argentina secure a gold medal.

== International goals ==
The following table lists all goals scored by Méndez at international level.

Goal	Date	Location	Opponent	Score	Result	Event	Ref
1	8 June 2025	Estadio Beteró, Valencia, Spain	Spain	1–3	2–3	2024–25 FIH Pro League	
2	11 June 2025	Wagener Stadium, Amsterdam, Netherlands	India	4–3	4–3	2024–25 FIH Pro League	
3	21 June 2025	Ernst-Reuter Sportfeld, Berlin, Germany	Germany	2–2	3–2	2024–25 FIH Pro League	
4	29 July 2025	Cancha Celeste, Montevideo, Uruguay	Uruguay	4–0	12–0	2025 Pan American Cup	
5	29 July 2025	Cancha Celeste, Montevideo, Uruguay	Uruguay	6–0	12–0	2025 Pan American Cup	
6	3 August 2025	Cancha Celeste, Montevideo, Uruguay	United States	5–0	10–0	2025 Pan American Cup	
