= Antonin Igau =

French field hockey player

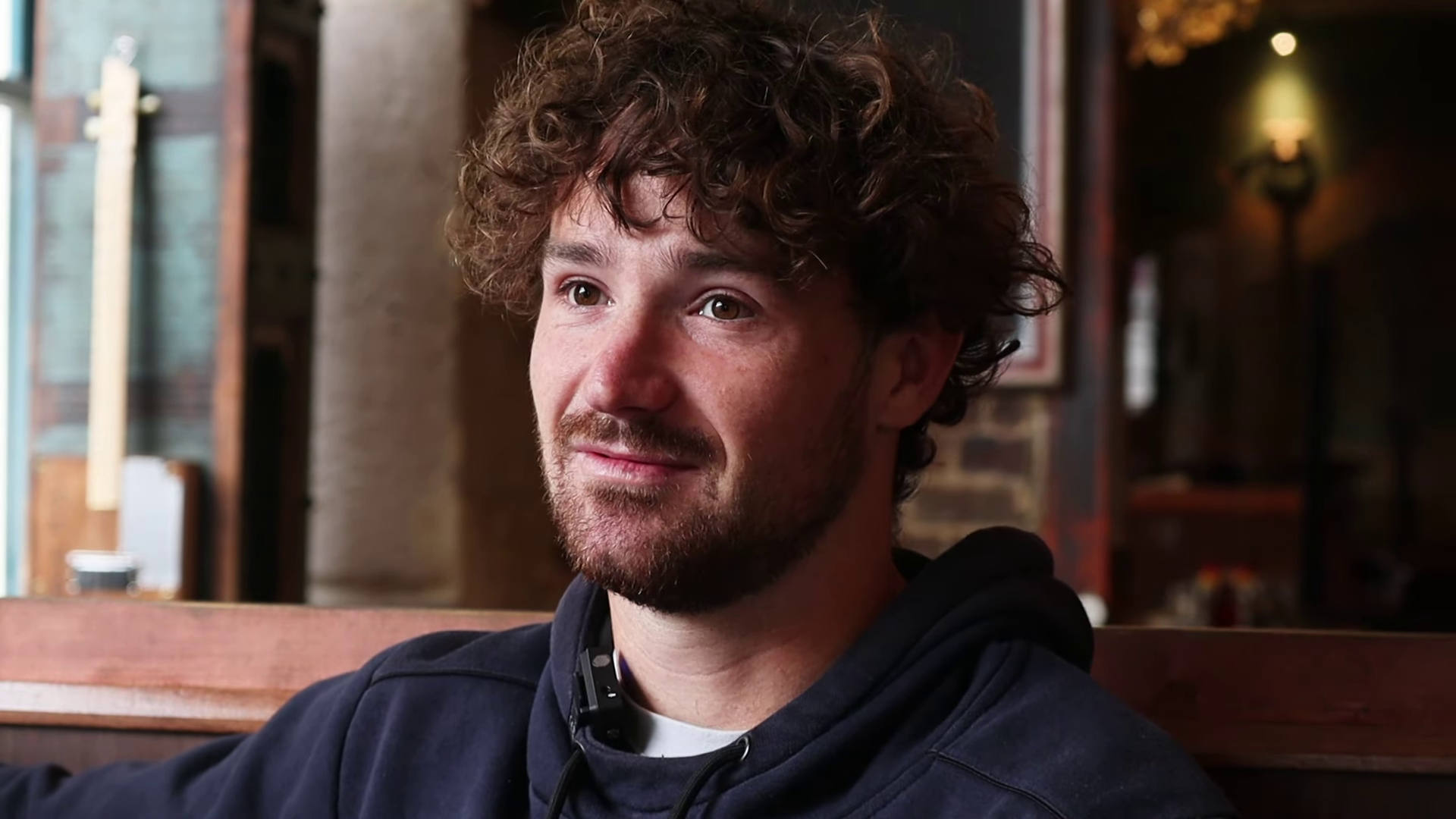
- Antonin Igau in 2024

Personal information
- Born: 9 September 2000 (age 25)
- Height: 175 cm (5 ft 9 in)
- Weight: 68 kg (150 lb)

Sport
- Sport: Field hockey
- Position: Forward
- Club: Montrouge
Youth career
- Years: Team
- 2008–2015: Magdunois
- 2015–2016: Mer
Senior career
Years	Team	Caps	Goals
2016–2018	Stade Français	-	-
2018–2021	Montrouge	-	-
2021–2022	Antwerp	-	-
2022–2023	Herakles	-	-
2023–present	Montrouge	-	-
National team
Years	Team	Caps	Goals
2019–2021	France U21	11	(5)
2021–present	France	17	(2)
Medal record
Men's field hockey
Representing France
Junior World Cup
Bronze medal – third place	2021 Bhubaneswar

Antonin Igau (born 9 September 2000) is a French field hockey player who plays as a forward for Montrouge and the French national team.

== Club career ==
Igau started playing hockey when he was eight years old at Magdunois Hockey Club, he played there for seven seasons until 2015. He then played one year for Mer Hockey Club. From 2016 until 2018 he played for Stade Français and afterwards three years for Montrouge. After the 2021 European Championship he moved abroad to Royal Antwerp in the Belgian Hockey League. At the end of the season Antwerp was relegated to the second division but he kept playing in the first division because on 30 March 2022 it was announced he joined Herakles for the 2022–23 season. After two season in Belgium he returned to Montrouge in 2023.

== International career ==
=== Junior national team ===
Antonin Igau made his debut for the French U–21 team in 2019. He represented the side at the EuroHockey Junior Championship in Valencia. He appeared in the team again in 2021, at the FIH Junior World Cup in Bhubaneswar. At the tournament he won a bronze medal.

=== Les Bleus ===
Two years after his junior debut, Igau made his first appearance for Les Bleus in a test match against Belgium in Antwerp. Later that year he went on to represent the team at the EuroHockey Championships in Amsterdam. At the tournament, Igau was awarded the 'Volvo U–21 Talent of the Tournament'. Igau was named in the French squad for the 2021–22 FIH Pro League.
