= Andrew Hobson =

South African field hockey player

Personal information
- Born: 24 March 1998 (age 28)

Sport
- Sport: Field hockey
- Position: Defender
- Club: Central
National team
Years	Team	Caps	Goals
2017–present	South Africa	36	(1)
Medal record
Men's field hockey
Representing South Africa
Africa Cup of Nations
Gold medal – first place	2025 Ismailia

Andrew Hobson (born 20 March 1998) is a South African field hockey player. He will compete in the 2024 Summer Olympics.

== Career ==
=== Senior national team ===
Hobson made he debut for the 2017 Cape Town Summer Series.

== Personal life ==
He attended Paul Roos Gymnasium, graduated at the Stellenbosch University.
