= Woking Hockey Club =

English field hockey club

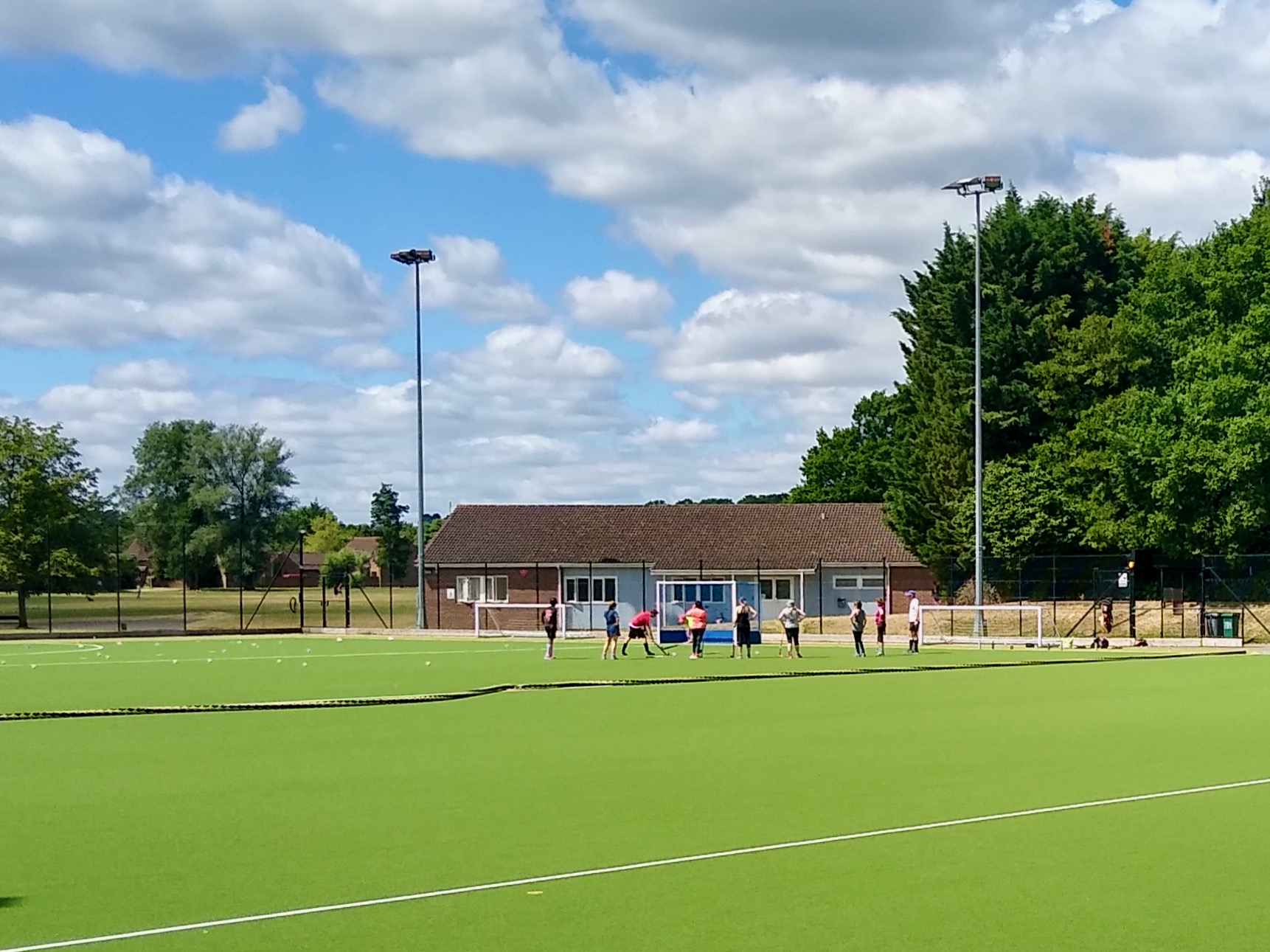
A practice session at Goldsworth Park

Woking Hockey Club is a field hockey club based in Woking, Surrey, England. The home ground is situated in Goldsworth Park, about one mile (1.6 km) from Woking town centre. The club has two sand dressed astro-turf pitches. Next to the pitches is a Club House that contains a cafe, toilets and changing rooms. The club is one of the largest hockey clubs in the country.

The men's 1st XI play in South East Premier Division. The ladies' 1st XI play in South East Premier Division. The club fields nine men's teams and six ladies' teams as well as a thriving Juniors section. The club is accredited by England Hockey's Clubs First Scheme.

== Badge ==
The club's badge are a purple and red hockey stick crossed, with the Woking coat of arms on the left and a swift on the right side. Above and below the badge 'Woking H.C.' is written in gold lettering.
