= Bautista Capurro =

Argentine field hockey player

Personal information
- Full name: Bautista Capurro Zubeldía
- Born: 22 October 2003 (age 22) Buenos Aires, Argentina
- Height: 173 cm (5 ft 8 in)
- Weight: 66 kg (146 lb)

Sport
- Sport: Field hockey
- Position: Forward
Senior career
Years	Team	Caps	Goals
–	Ciudad de Buenos Aires	-	-
National team
Years	Team	Caps	Goals
2021–2023	Argentina U–21	16	(13)
2022–	Argentina	28	(10)
Medal record
Men's field hockey
Representing Argentina
World Cup
Bronze medal – third place	2026 Wavre/Amstelveen
Pan American Cup
Gold medal – first place	2025 Montevideo
South American Games
Gold medal – first place	2022 Asunción	Team
FIH Junior World Cup
Gold medal – first place	2021 Bhubaneswar	Team
Pan American Junior Championship
Gold medal – first place	2023 St. Michael	Team

Bautista Capurro Zubeldía (Note: In this Spanish name, the first or paternal surname is Capurro and the second or maternal family name is Zubeldía.) (born 22 October 2003) is an Argentine field hockey player.

In 2024, he represented Argentina at the XXXIII Summer Olympics in France.

== Career ==
=== Under–21 ===
Bautista Capurro made his international debut at under-21 level, making his first appearance in 2021. He debuted for the Argentine U–21 team at the FIH Junior World Cup in Bhubaneswar, where he won a gold medal.

He represented the team again in 2023. He was a member of the gold medal-winning squad at the Pan American Junior Championship in St. Michael. He also represented the team again later in the year at the FIH Junior World Cup in Kuala Lumpur.

=== Los Leones ===
Capurro received his first call-up to the Los Leones squad in 2022. He made his senior international debut during season three of the FIH Pro League. Later in the year he won his first medal with the senior team, taking home gold at the South American Games in Asunción.

In 2023 Capurro was permanently raised to the national squad. He was named as a reserve player for the FIH World Cup in Bhubaneswar and Rourkela, making two appearances after an injury to Lucas Vila. Later in the year he was a reserve player for Los Leones at the Pan American Games in Santiago.

On 7 June 2024, he was named in the national squad for the XXXIII Summer Olympics in Paris.

==== International goals ====
Goal	Date	Location	Opponent	Score	Result	Competition	Ref.
1	20 October 2022	Parque Olímpico, Asunción, Paraguay	Uruguay	11–0	17–0	2022 South American Games	
2	5 October 2022	Parque Olímpico, Asunción, Paraguay	Peru	11–0	17–0	2022 South American Games	
3	5 October 2022	Parque Olímpico, Asunción, Paraguay	Peru	12–0	17–0	2022 South American Games	
4	9 October 2022	Parque Olímpico, Asunción, Paraguay	Brazil	1–0	12–0	2022 South American Games	
5	9 October 2022	Parque Olímpico, Asunción, Paraguay	Brazil	9–0	12–0	2022 South American Games	
6	11 October 2022	Parque Olímpico, Asunción, Paraguay	Chile	2–0	3–1	2022 South American Games	
7	26 January 2023	Birsa Munda International Hockey Stadium, Rourkela, India	Chile	4–0	8–0	2023 FIH World Cup	
8	23 May 2024	Wilrijkse Plein, Antwerp, Belgium	Ireland	3–0	3–1	2023–24 FIH Pro League	
9	25 May 2024	Wilrijkse Plein, Antwerp, Belgium	Ireland	1–1	4–3	2023–24 FIH Pro League	
10	2 June 2024	Wilrijkse Plein, Antwerp, Belgium	Spain	1–0	2–1	2023–24 FIH Pro League	
