= Joaquín Toscani =

Argentine field hockey player

Personal information
- Born: 25 February 2002 (age 24) Argentina

Sport
- Sport: Field hockey
- Position: Midfield
- Club: Banco Provincia
National team
Years	Team	Caps	Goals
2021–2023	Argentina U–21	20	(4)
2024–	Argentina	21	(1)
Medal record
Men's field hockey
Representing Argentina
World Cup
Bronze medal – third place	2026 Wavre/Amstelveen
Pan American Cup
Gold medal – first place	2025 Montevideo	Team
FIH Junior World Cup
Gold medal – first place	2021 Bhubaneswar	Team
Pan American Junior Championship
Gold medal – first place	2023 Saint Michael	Team
Silver medal – second place	2021 Santiago	Team

Joaquín Toscani (born 25 February 2002) is an international field hockey player from Argentina.

== Personal life ==
Toscani has an older brother, Lucas, who also plays international field hockey for Argentina.

== Career ==
=== Under–21 ===
Toscani made his international debut for Argentina at under–21 level. He made his first appearances for the junior national team in 2021. He was a member of the squad at the delayed Pan American Junior Championship in Santiago, where he won a silver medal. Later that year he won a gold medal-winning at the FIH Junior World Cup in Bhubaneswar.

Throughout 2023, Toscani continued to represent the national junior team. He was a member of the gold medal-winning squad at the Pan American Junior Championship in Saint Michael. At the conclusion of the competition, he was awarded the Player of the Tournament trophy. He also represented the team at his second FIH Junior World Cup in Kuala Lumpur.

=== Los Leones ===
In 2024, Toscani received his first call-up to Los Leones. He earned his first senior international cap during a match against Belgium in Santiago del Estero, during the fifth season of the FIH Pro League.

Since his debut, he has made more appearances for the national team during the sixth season of the FIH Pro League. In 2025, he was named in the squad for the 2025 Pan American Cup in Montevideo. At the tournament he scored his first international goal, helping Argentina secure a gold medal.

== International goals ==
The following table lists all goals scored by Toscani at international level.

Goal	Date	Location	Opponent	Score	Result	Event	Ref
1	29 July 2025	Cancha Celeste, Montevideo, Uruguay	Uruguay	11–0	12–0	2025 Pan American Cup	
