= France men's national field hockey team =

Men's national field hockey team representing France

France
- Nickname(s): Les Bleus
- Association: France Hockey Federation (Fédération Française de Hockey)
- Confederation: EHF (Europe)
- Head Coach: John-John Dohmen
- Assistant coach(es): Jeroen Hertzberger; Ramón Sala
- Manager: Julien Ryckembusch
- Captain: François Goyet
Home	Away

FIH ranking
- Current: 10 (23 September 2026)

Olympic Games
- Appearances: 10 (first in 1908)
- Best result: 4th (1920, 1936)

World Cup
- Appearances: 5 (first in 1971)
- Best result: 7th (1971, 1990)

EuroHockey Championship
- Appearances: 17 (first in 1970)
- Best result: 4th (1970, 2025)

The France men's national field hockey team represents France in international field hockey competitions.

== Tournament history ==
=== Summer Olympics ===
Summer Olympics record
Year	Host	Position	Pld	W	D	L	GF	GA	Squad
1908	(United Kingdom) London, Great Britain	6th	2	0	0	2	1	11	Squad
1920	Antwerp, Belgium	4th	3	0	0	3	3	17	Squad
1928	Amsterdam, Netherlands	5th	3	1	0	2	2	8	Squad
1932	Los Angeles, United States	did not participate							
1936	(Nazi Germany) Berlin, Germany	4th	5	1	1	3	7	19	Squad
1948	(United Kingdom) London, Great Britain	8th	4	0	1	3	4	9	Squad
1952	Helsinki, Finland	11th	3	1	0	2	6	8	Squad
1956	Melbourne, Australia	did not participate							
1960	Rome, Italy	10th	5	2	1	2	3	7	Squad
1964	Tokyo, Japan	did not participate							
1968	Mexico City, Mexico	10th	8	2	1	5	2	8	Squad
1972	Munich, West Germany	12th	8	2	1	5	10	17	Squad
1976 to 1988		did not participate							
1992 to 2020		did not qualify							
2024	Paris, France	11th	5	0	1	4	8	22	Squad
2028	Los Angeles, United States	to be determined							
2032	Brisbane, Australia	to be determined							
Total		4th place	46	9	6	31	46	126	

=== World Cup ===
World Cup record
Year	Host	Position	Pld	W	D	L	GF	GA	Squad
1971	Barcelona, Spain	7th	6	3	0	3	4	7	—N/a
1973 to 1986		did not qualify.							
1990	Lahore, Pakistan	7th	7	3	1	3	9	13	—N/a
1994 to 2014		did not qualify.							
2018	Bhubaneswar, India	8th	5	2	1	2	8	9	Squad
2023	Odisha, India	13th	6	2	2	2	14	23	Squad
2026	Wavre, Belgium; Amstelveen, Netherlands	13th	6	2	2	2	12	12	
Total		5/16	30	12	6	12	47	64	

=== EuroHockey Championship ===
- 1970 – 4th place
- 1974 – 6th place
- 1978 – 7th place
- 1983 – 6th place
- 1987 – 11th place
- 1991 – 6th place
- 1995 – 12th place
- 1999 – 7th place
- 2003 – 5th place
- 2005 – 5th place
- 2007 – 6th place
- 2009 – 6th place
- 2011 – 8th place
- 2015 – 7th place
- 2021 – 6th place
- 2023 – 5th place
- 2025 – 4th place
- 2027 – Qualified

=== EuroHockey Championship II ===
- 2013 – (silver)
- 2017 – (bronze)
- 2019 – (gold)

=== World League ===
- 2012–13 – 16th place
- 2014–15 – 14th place
- 2016–17 – 13th place

=== FIH Pro League ===
- 2021–22 – 8th place
- 2026–27 – To be determined

=== FIH Hockey Nations Cup ===
- 2022 – 5th place
- 2023–24 – (silver)
- 2024–25 – (bronze)
- 2025–26 – (gold)

=== Champions Trophy ===
- 1992 – 6th place

=== Champions Challenge I ===
- 2014 – 6th place

=== Champions Challenge II ===
- 2009 – (bronze)
- 2011 – (silver)

== Current squad ==
Roster for the 2026 Men's FIH Hockey World Cup.

Head coach: John-John Dohmen

2. Aristide Michaelis
3. Mattéo Desgouillons
4. Brieuc Delemazure
6. Corentin Sellier
7. Lucas Montecot
8. Xavier Esmenjaud
9. Mathis Clément
11. Noé Jouin
12. Gaspard Xavier
13. Benjamin Marqué
14. Malo Martinache
16. François Goyet (C)
17. Florent Vaal
18. Eliot Curty
22. Victor Charlet
23. Marius Clément (GK)
24. Amaury Bellenger
28. Timothée Clément
31. Corentin Saunier (GK)
95. Louis Haertelmeyer

== Results and fixtures ==
The following is a list of match results in the last 12 months, as well as any future matches that have been scheduled.

Win Draw Loss Fixture

=== 2026 ===
==== 2026 FIH World Cup Qualifiers ====
01 March 2026 GS	France	2–3	Scotland	Santiago, Chile
16:30	Xavier 5'; Charlet 20'	Report	J. Golden 25'; C. Golden 27', 30'	Stadium: Estadio Nacional del Hockey Césped Claudia Schüler

03 March 2026 GS	Wales	0–5	France	Santiago, Chile
18:00		Report	Charlet 20', 41', 50'; Marqué 37', 51'	Stadium: Estadio Nacional del Hockey Césped Claudia Schüler

04 March 2026 GS	France	3–3	Chile	Santiago, Chile
20:15	Charlet 21', 51'; Marqué 56'	Report	Amoroso 15', 57'; Goñi 37'	Stadium: Estadio Nacional del Hockey Césped Claudia Schüler

06 March 2026 SF	France	4–2	Poland	Santiago, Chile
17:15	T. Clément 15'; Branicki 20'; Esmenjaud 21'; Sellier 36'	Report	T. Bembenek 22'; Rutkowski 34'	Stadium: Estadio Nacional del Hockey Césped Claudia Schüler

08 March 2026 Final	France	1–2	Ireland	Santiago, Chile
15:45	Haertelmeyer 24'	Report	Williams 26', 36'	Stadium: Estadio Nacional del Hockey Césped Claudia Schüler

==== 2026 FIH Nations Cup ====
11 June 2026 Pool B	France	4–2	South Africa	Cape Town, South Africa
19:00	Sellier 11'; Charlet 36', 53', 60'	Report	Melville 13'; Mentoor 20'	Stadium: Hartleyvale Stadium

13 June 2026 Pool B	Ireland	0–2	France	Cape Town, South Africa
14:45		Report	Esmenjaud 25'; Clément 35'	Stadium: Hartleyvale Stadium

16 June 2026 Pool B	France	4–1	United States	Cape Town, South Africa
16:45	Esmenjaud 12'; Charlet 33', 35', 57'	Report	Charasika 14'	Stadium: Hartleyvale Stadium

19 June 2026 Semi finals	France	4–3	Japan	Cape Town, South Africa
19:00	Charlet 7'; Esmenjaud 11'; Clément 28'; Sellier 53'	Report	Ooka 5'; S. Yamada 8'; H. Yamada 22'	Stadium: Hartleyvale Stadium

20 June 2026 Final	South Africa	1–2	France	Cape Town, South Africa
19:00	Mvimbi 48'	Report	Charlet 4'; Tynevez 8'	Stadium: Hartleyvale Stadium

==== Friendly match ====
24 July 2026 Match 1	Netherlands	5–0	France	Amstelveen, Netherlands
				Stadium: Wagener Stadium

25 July 2026 Match 2	Netherlands	2–2	France	Amstelveen, Netherlands
				Stadium: Wagener Stadium

==== 2026 FIH World Cup ====
15 August 2026 Pool A	Belgium	3–2	France	Wavre, Belgium
21:00	Onana 17'; Duvekot 44'; Hendrickx 56'	Report	Curty 3'; Vaal 18'	Stadium: Belfius Hockey Arena

17 August 2026 Pool A	France	3–3	Malaysia	Wavre, Belgium
14:00	Charlet 19'; Haertelmeyer 37'; Jouin 59'	Report	Silverius 5', 45'; Anuar 57'	Stadium: Belfius Hockey Arena

19 August 2026 Pool A	France	1–1	Germany	Wavre, Belgium
17:00	Haertelmeyer 60'	Report	Weigand 43'	Stadium: Belfius Hockey Arena

21 August 2026 Pool H	France	1–3	South Africa	Wavre, Belgium
11:00	Charlet 30'	Report	M. Cassiem 17', 19'; D. Cassiem 60'	Stadium: Belfius Hockey Arena

23 August 2026 Pool H	France	2–1	Ireland	Wavre, Belgium
14:30	Charlet 42'; Clément 59'	Report	Duncan 39'	Stadium: Belfius Hockey Arena

28 August 2026 13th place match	Japan	1–3	France	Amstelveen, Netherlands
09:30	Watanabe 22'	Report	Desgouillons 17'; Clément 59'; Charlet 59'	Stadium: Wagener Stadium

== See also ==
- France women's national field hockey team
