= Ahmed Abass =

Kenyan politicians

Ahmed Ibrahim Abass is a Kenyan politician and a member of the 11th Kenyan parliament from Ijara Constituency in Garissa County.

== Career ==
He was elected to the parliament on the ticket of Orange Democratic Movement (ODM) with the support of CORD Coalition in 2013 and served on the house committee on Public Works, Road and Transport. In 2016, Abass voted to oppose a bill to amend the constitution to allow nomination of women to the National Assembly to fill the quota allocated to women if the number of women elected to the assembly fall short of the two-third gender rules. The bill was brought by a leader of their party (ODM), Raila Odinga who appealed to ODM MPs to support it. Interestingly, Abass lost his reelection to a woman, the first to be elected from the North East to the national assembly in 2017. In 2016, Abass featured in a bribery allegation against PAC committee members who received KSH.1.5 million to downplay a corruption scandal in the office of the president.
