= Facundo Zárate =

Argentine field hockey player

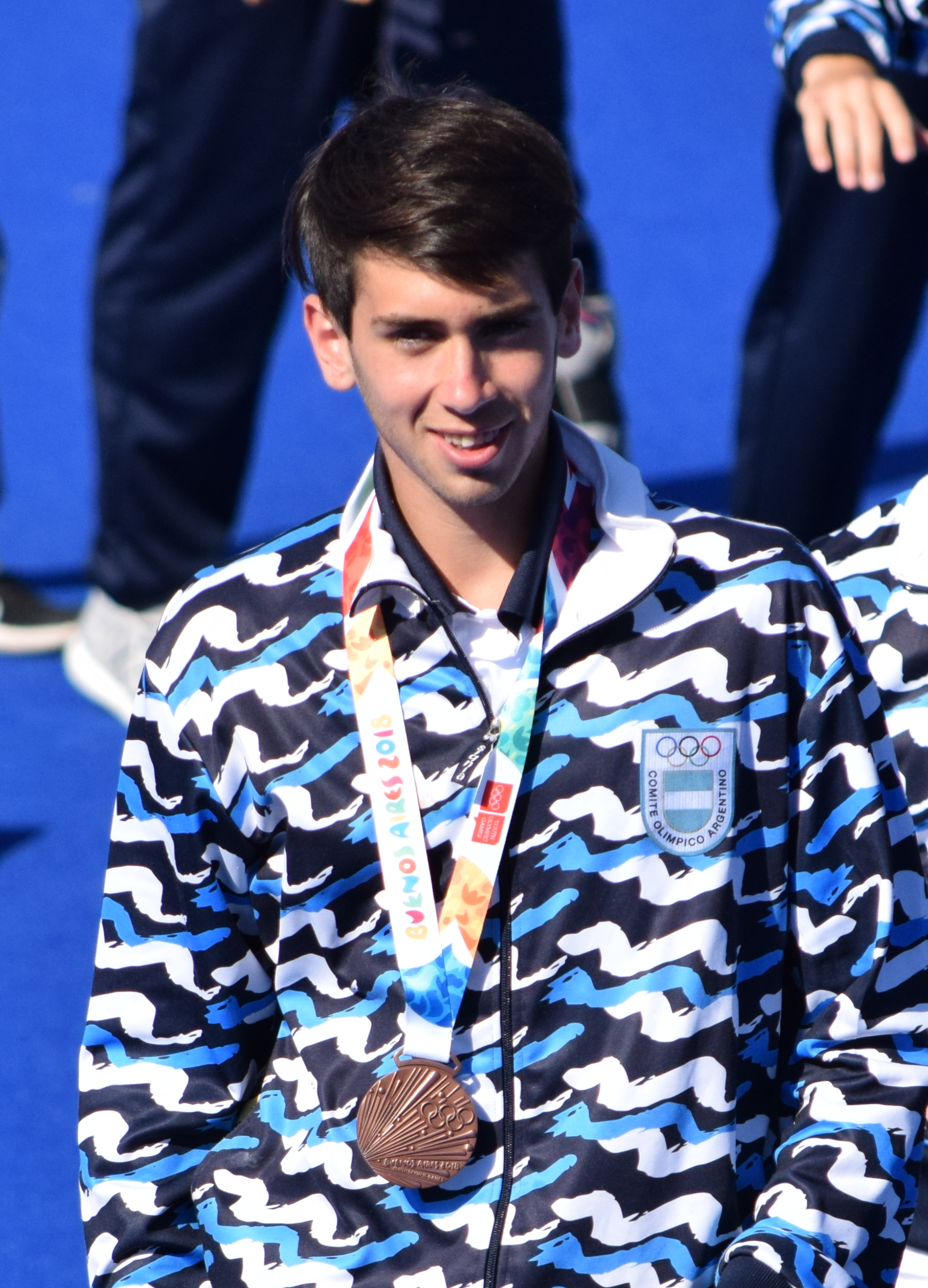

Personal information
- Full name: Facundo Julio Zárate
- Born: 31 July 2000 (age 26) Córdoba, Argentina

Sport
- Sport: Field hockey
- Position: Defence
National team
Years	Team	Caps	Goals
2020–2021	Argentina U–21	6	(3)
2022–	Argentina	43	(0)
Medal record
Men's field hockey
Representing Argentina
World Cup
Bronze medal – third place	2026 Wavre/Amstelveen
Pan American Cup
Gold medal – first place	2025 Montevideo	Team
South American Games
Gold medal – first place	2022 Asunción	Team
FIH Junior World Cup
Gold medal – first place	2021 Bhubaneswar	Team
Youth Olympic Games
Bronze medal – third place	2018 Buenos Aires	Team

Facundo Julio Zárate (born 31 July 2000) is an international field hockey player from Argentina.

== Career ==
=== Under–18 ===
In 2018, Zárate was a member of the bronze medal-winning team in the Hockey5s tournament at the Youth Olympic Games in Buenos Aires.

=== Under–21 ===
Zárate made his international debut for the Argentine under–21 team in 2021. He made his first appearances for the junior national team at the FIH Junior World Cup in Bhubaneswar. At the tournament, he captained the side to a gold medal.

=== Los Leones ===
In 2022, Zárate received his first call-up to Los Leones. He was a member of the squad that competed during the third season of the FIH Pro League. He earned his first senior international cap during a match against Belgium in Buenos Aires.

He won a gold medal at the 2022 South American Games in Asunción, as well as the 2025 Pan American Cup in Montevideo.
