= Jacques van Tonder =

South African field hockey player

Personal information
- Born: 11 April 2000 (age 26)

Sport
- Sport: Field hockey
- Position: Defender
- Club: WPCC Badgers
Senior career
Years	Team	Caps	Goals
2019–2023	Maties	-	-
2024–present	WPCC Badgers	-	-
National team
Years	Team	Caps	Goals
2021	South Africa U21	6	(2)
2022–present	South Africa	37	(2)
- Updated on 4 August 2025

Jacques Michiel van Tonder (born 11 April 2000) is a South African field hockey player who plays for the South African national team. He competed in the 2024 Summer Olympics.

== Early life ==
He attended Grey College, Bloemfontein, graduated at the Stellenbosch University.

== Career ==
=== Under–21 ===
He made the 2021 FIH Hockey Junior World Cup in Bhubaneswar.

=== Senior national team ===
Jacques made he debut for the 2022 Sultan Azlan Shah Cup.
