= Mahmoud Seleem =

Egyptian association football analyst

Mahmoud Seleem (born 1 September 1991), is an Egyptian association football analyst.

== Career ==
Besides Egypt, he has worked in Saudi Arabia. He has been working for Egypt national football team since 2021 when he was picked up by Carlos Queiroz. Seleem was appointed in 2019 by Al Wehda FC in Saudi Arabia as an analyst under Egyptian coach Mido and continued to work under Uruguayan coach José Daniel Carreño at the club. Seleem had a stint in 2018 as a scout for Al Ahly SC in Egypt.
