= Noé Jouin =

French field hockey player

Personal information
- Born: 2 August 2002 (age 24)
- Height: 175 cm (5 ft 9 in)
- Weight: 62 kg (137 lb)

Sport
- Sport: Field hockey
- Position: Forward
- Club: Saint Germain
National team
Years	Team	Caps	Goals
2021–	France	1	(0)
2021–	France U–21	6	(2)
Medal record
Men's field hockey
Representing France
Junior World Cup
Silver medal – second place	2023 Kuala Lumpur
Bronze medal – third place	2021 Bhubaneswar

Noé Jouin (born 2 August 2002) is a French field hockey player who plays as a forward.

== Career ==
=== Club level ===
In club competition, Jouin plays for Saint Germain in the French National League.

=== Les Bleus ===
Jouin made his debut for Les Bleus in 2021 during a test match against Belgium in Antwerp. Later that year he was also named in the French squad for season three of the FIH Pro League.

=== Junior national team ===
Noé Jouin made his debut for the French U–21 team in 2021 at the FIH Junior World Cup in Bhubaneswar. At the tournament he won a bronze medal.
