= Mattéo Desgouillons =

French field hockey player (born 2000)

Personal information
- Born: 21 January 2000 (age 26)
- Height: 184 cm (6 ft 0 in)
- Weight: 84 kg (185 lb)

Sport
- Sport: Field hockey
- Position: Defender
- Club: Lille
Youth career
- Team
- –: Lille
- –: Girondins de Bordeaux
Senior career
Years	Team	Caps	Goals
–2018	Girondins de Bordeaux	-	-
2018–2021	Montrouge	-	-
2021–2023	Gantoise	-	-
2023–present	Lille	-	-
National team
Years	Team	Caps	Goals
2019–2021	France U21	11	(2)
2021–present	France	38	(0)
Medal record
Men's field hockey
Representing France
Junior World Cup
Bronze medal – third place	2021 Bhubaneswar

Mattéo Desgouillons (born 21 January 2000) is a French field hockey player who plays as a defender for Lille MHC and the French national team.

== Club career ==
Desgouillons started playing hockey at Lille and then played for Girondins de Bordeaux and Montrouge. He moved to La Gantoise in the Men's Belgian Hockey League in the summer of 2021. In the 2022–23 season, he won the Belgian title after they defeated the Waterloo Ducks in the final. After the championship he returned to the club where he started playing hockey: Lille.

== International career ==
=== Junior national team ===
Mattéo Desgouillons made his debut for the French U–21 team in 2019 at the EuroHockey Junior Championship in Valencia.

In 2021 he won a bronze medal with the team at the FIH Junior World Cup in Bhubaneswar.

=== Les Bleus ===
Desgouillons made his debut for Les Bleus in 2021 during a test match against Belgium in Antwerp. He went on to compete at the EuroHockey Championships in Amsterdam later that year. He was also named in the French squad for the season three of the FIH Pro League.
