= Corentin Sellier =

French field hockey player

Personal information
- Born: 29 May 2001 (age 25)
- Height: 186 cm (6 ft 1 in)
- Weight: 88 kg (194 lb)

Sport
- Sport: Field hockey
- Position: Forward
- Club: CA Montrouge
National team
Years	Team	Caps	Goals
2019–2021	France U–21	11	(6)
2021–	France	6	(0)
Medal record
Men's field hockey
Representing France
Junior World Cup
Bronze medal – third place	2021 Bhubaneswar	Team

Corentin Sellier (born 29 May 2001) is a French field hockey player, who plays as a forward.

== Career ==
=== Junior national team ===
Corentin Sellier made his debut for the French U–21 team in 2019 at the EuroHockey Junior Championship in Valencia.

In 2021 he won a bronze medal with the team at the FIH Junior World Cup in Bhubaneswar.

=== Les Bleus ===
Sellier made his debut for Les Bleus in 2021 at the EuroHockey Championships in Amsterdam. Later that year he was also named in the French squad for the season three of the FIH Pro League.
