= Benjamin Marqué =

French field hockey player

Personal information
- Born: 11 August 2000 (age 26)
- Height: 174 cm (5 ft 9 in)
- Weight: 71 kg (157 lb)

Sport
- Sport: Field hockey
- Position: Midfielder / Forward
- Club: Royal Daring
Senior career
Years	Team	Caps	Goals
–2020	Lille	-	-
2020–present	Daring	-	-
National team
Years	Team	Caps	Goals
2017–2021	France U–21	16	(1)
2021–present	France	11	(2)
Medal record
Men's field hockey
Representing France
Junior World Cup
Bronze medal – third place	2021 Bhubaneswar

Benjamin Marqué (born 11 August 2000) is a French field hockey player who plays as a midfielder or forward for Belgian Hockey League club Royal Daring and the French national team.

== Club career ==
In club competition, Marqué currently plays for Royal Daring in the Belgian Hockey League. He joined Daring in 2020, before he played for Lille MHC.

== International career ==
=== Junior national team ===
Benjamin Marqué made his debut for the French U–21 team in 2017. He represented the side at the EuroHockey Junior Championship II in Saint Petersburg, where he won a gold medal.

He represented the team again in 2019 at the EuroHockey Junior Championship in Valencia.

In 2021 he won a bronze medal with the team at the FIH Junior World Cup in Bhubaneswar.

=== Les Bleus ===
Benjamin Marqué made his debut for Les Bleus in 2021 at the EuroHockey Championships in Amsterdam. Later that year he was also named in the French squad for the season three of the FIH Pro League.
