= Eduard de Ignacio-Simó =

Spanish field hockey player (born 2000)

Personal information
- Full name: Eduard de Ignacio-Simó Abad
- Born: 3 March 2000 (age 26) Spain

Sport
- Sport: Field hockey
- Position: Forward
- Club: CD Terrassa
National team
Years	Team	Caps	Goals
2021	Spain U–21	6	(6)
2022–	Spain	1	(0)

Eduard de Ignacio-Simó Abad (Note: In this Spanish name, the first or paternal surname is de Ignacio-Simó and the second or maternal family name is Abad.) (born 3 March 2000) is a field hockey player from Spain, who plays as a Forward.

== Career ==
=== Club level ===
In the Spanish División de Honor, De Ignacio-Simó plays for CD Terrassa.

=== Spain ===
==== Under–21 ====
In 2021, De Ignacio-Simó was a member of the Spanish U–21 team at the FIH Junior World Cup in Bhubaneswar.

==== Los Redsticks ====
De Ignacio-Simó made his debut for Los Redsticks in 2022, during a test match against the Netherlands in Cádiz. He was later named in the national squad for season three of the FIH Pro League.
