= Borja Lacalle =

Spanish field hockey player (born 2001)

Personal information
- Full name: Borja Lacalle Álvarez
- Born: 21 May 2001 (age 25) Madrid, Spain

Sport
- Sport: Field hockey
- Position: Midfielder / Forward
- Club: Oranje–Rood
Youth career
- Team
- –: Club de Campo
Senior career
Years	Team	Caps	Goals
–2024	Club de Campo	-	-
2024–present	Oranje–Rood	-	-
National team
Years	Team	Caps	Goals
2021–2022	Spain U21	11	(1)
2022–present	Spain	76	(10)
Medal record
Men's field hockey
Representing Spain
World Cup
Silver medal – second place	2026 Wavre/Amstelveen
EuroHockey Championship
Bronze medal – third place	2025 Mönchengladbach
EuroHockey U18 Championship
Gold medal – first place	2018 Santander

Borja Lacalle Álvarez (born 21 May 2001) is a Spanish field hockey player who plays as a midfielder or forward for Dutch Hoofdklasse club Oranje–Rood, and the Spain national team.

== Personal life ==
Borja Lacalle was born and raised in Madrid, Spain. He is a former student of CUNEF Universidad.

== Club career ==
Lacalle currently plays in the Dutch national league, the Hoofdklasse. He is a member of the Oranje–Rood first team. He formerly competed for Club de Campo in the División de Honor and Euro Hockey League.

== International career ==
=== Under–21 ===
Lacalle made his debut for the Spanish U–21 side in 2021. He made his first appearances during the FIH Junior World Cup in Bhubaneswar. His final appearances for the national junior squad came in 2022, at the EuroHockey U–21 Championship in Ghent.

=== Red Sticks ===
Following his successful junior debut, Lacalle made his senior international debut for the Red Sticks during the third season of the FIH Pro League. He earned his first cap during a match against Argentina in Valencia, which ended as a 1–0 defeat.

Tournament History

Lacalle has competed at numerous international tournaments, including:

- FIH Pro League – seasons three, four, five and six.
- 2023 FIH World Cup – Bhubaneswar and Rourkela.
- 2023 EuroHockey Championships – Mönchengladbach.
- 2024 FIH Olympic Qualifiers – Valencia.
- 2024 Olympic Games – Paris.
