= Zenani Kraai =

South African field hockey player

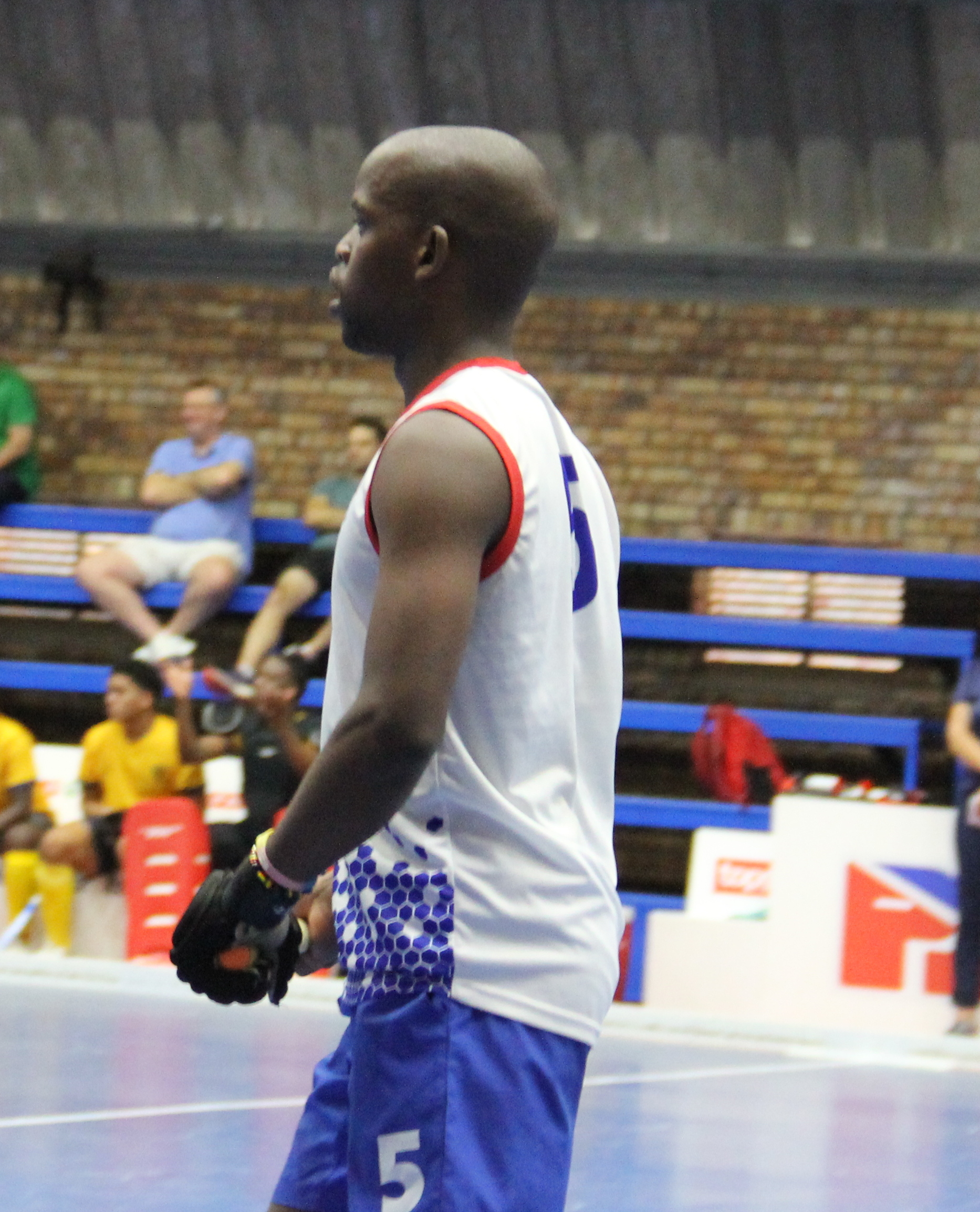
- 2024 Indoor IPT Men's A-Section: Western Province v Southern Gauteng

Personal information
- Born: 5 November 2000 (age 25)

Sport
- Sport: Field hockey
- Position: Midfielder
- Club: Langa
National team
Years	Team	Caps	Goals
2021	South Africa U21	18	(1)
2022–present	South Africa	6	(1)
2022–present	South Africa Hockey5s	6	(0)
Medal record
Representing South Africa
Men's field hockey
Africa Cup of Nations
Gold medal – first place	2025 Ismailia
- Updated on 22 June 2024

Zenani Kraai (born 5 November 2000) is a South African field hockey player who plays for the South African national team. He will compete in the 2024 Summer Olympics.

His brother Litha also is the national under-21 hockey team and national indoor hockey team.

== Career ==
=== Under–21 ===
He made the 2021 FIH Hockey Junior World Cup in Bhubaneswar.

=== Senior national team ===
Zenani made he debut for the 2022 Sultan Azlan Shah Cup.
