= Benedikt Schwarzhaupt =

German field hockey player

Personal information
- Born: 14 January 2001 (age 25) Germany

Sport
- Sport: Field hockey
- Position: Defender
- Club: Real Club de Polo
Senior career
Years	Team	Caps	Goals
–2024	UHC Hamburg	-	-
2024–present	Real Club de Polo	-	-
National team
Years	Team	Caps	Goals
2019–2022	Germany U21	17	(12)
2021–present	Germany	28	(0)
Medal record
Men's field hockey
Representing Germany
World Cup
Gold medal – first place	2026 Wavre/Amstelveen
EuroHockey Championships
Gold medal – first place	2025 Mönchengladbach
Junior World Cup
Silver medal – second place	2021 Bhubaneswar
EuroHockey Junior Championship
Gold medal – first place	2019 Valencia
Silver medal – second place	2022 Ghent

Benedikt Schwarzhaupt (born 14 January 2001) is a German field hockey player who plays as a defender for Spanish División de Honor club Real Club de Polo and the German national team.

== Club career ==
In club competition, Schwarzhaupt played for Uhlenhorster HC in the German Bundesliga until 2024, when he moved to Spain for his studies and started playing for Real Club de Polo.

== International career ==
=== Junior national team ===
Benedikt Schwarzhaupt made his debut for the German U–21 team in 2019. He represented the side at an invitational tournament in Madrid, as well as the EuroHockey Junior Championship in Valencia, where he won a gold medal.

In 2021, alongside Hannes Müller, Schwarzhaupt captained the junior team at the FIH Junior World Cup in Bhubaneswar.

=== Die Honamas ===
Schwarzhaupt made his debut for Die Honamas in 2021, during the second season of the FIH Pro League.
