= Timothée Clément =

French field hockey player (born 2000)

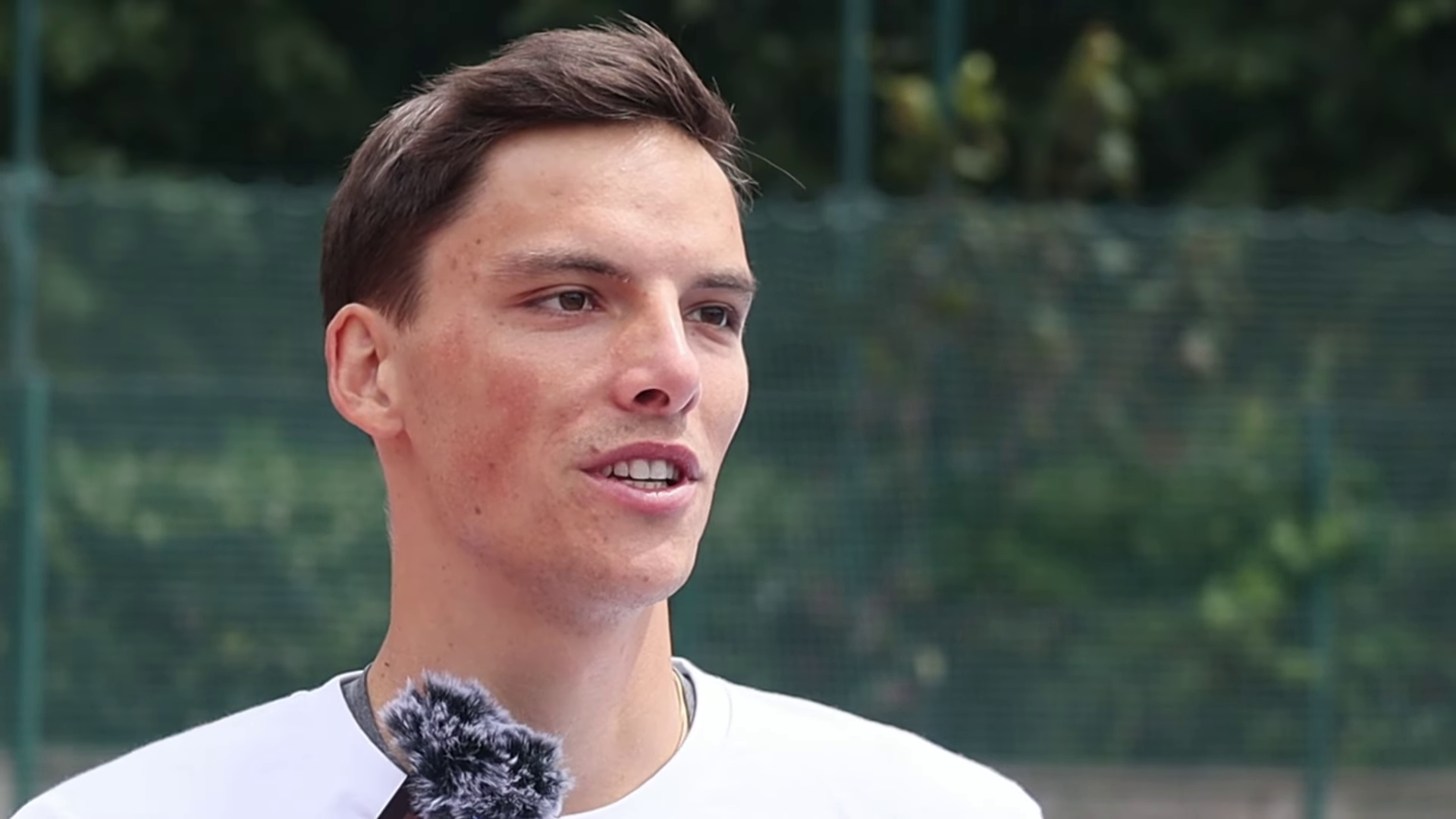
- Timothée Clément in 2024

Personal information
- Born: 8 April 2000 (age 26) Paris, France
- Height: 1.93 m (6 ft 4 in)
- Weight: 75 kg (165 lb)

Sport
- Sport: Field hockey
- Position: Midfielder / Forward
- Club: Gantoise
Youth career
- Team
- –: Montrouge
Senior career
Years	Team	Caps	Goals
–2020	Montrouge	-	-
2020–2022	Orée	-	-
2022–present	Gantoise	-	-
National team
Years	Team	Caps	Goals
2017–2021	France U21	16	(4)
2018–present	France	41	(14)
Medal record
Men's field hockey
Representing France
Junior World Cup
Bronze medal – third place	2021 Bhubaneswar

Timothée Clément (born 8 April 2000) is a French field hockey player who plays as a midfielder or forward for Belgian Hockey League club Gantoise and the French national team.

== Club career ==
Clément came through the youth ranks of Montrouge where he played until 2020 when he moved to Belgium to play for Royal Orée. He left Orée in 2022 to play for Gantoise whom he joined with his brother Mathis.

== International career ==
=== Junior national team ===
Timothée Clément made his debut for the French U–21 team in 2017. He represented the side at the EuroHockey Junior Championship II in Saint Petersburg, where he won a gold medal.

He represented the team again in 2019 at the EuroHockey Junior Championship in Valencia.

In 2021, he captained the team at the FIH Junior World Cup in Bhubaneswar. In the opening match, he scored a hat-trick in a 5–4 win over defending champions India.

In October 2022 he has elected rising star of the year after being best player in junior World Cup 2021, second top scorer in junior World Cup 2021 and top scorer in qualifying for the 2023 European Cup in Calais.

=== Les Bleus ===
A year after his junior debut, Clément debuted for Les Bleus in a test match against England in Wattignies. Later that year he represented the team at the 2018 FIH World Cup in Bhubaneswar, where the team finished eighth.

Since his debut, Clément has been a regular in the men's national team.
