= Nelson Onana =

Belgian field hockey player

Personal information
- Full name: Nelson Zacharie M. Onana Alima
- Born: 1 March 2000 (age 26) Sweden

Sport
- Sport: Field hockey
- Position: Forward
- Club: Léopold
Youth career
- Team
- –: Pingouin
Senior career
Years	Team	Caps	Goals
–2019	Pingouin	-	-
2019–2024	Braxgata	-	-
2024–present	Léopold	-	-
National team
Years	Team	Caps	Goals
2019–2021	Belgium U–21	9	(2)
2019–present	Belgium	25	(10)
Medal record
Men's field hockey
Representing Belgium
EuroHockey Championship
Bronze medal – third place	2023 Mönchengladbach

Nelson Zacharie M. Onana Alima (born 1 March 2000) is a field hockey player who plays for Léopold and the Belgium national team.

== Personal life ==
Onana was born in Sweden to a Belgian mother and a Cameroonian father. In Sweden he played floorball, and when his family returned to Belgium he started playing field hockey.

== Club career ==
Onana started playing hockey at Pingouin, where he played until 2019 when he moved to Braxgata. After five seasons in Boom, he moved to Brussels to play for Léopold.

== International career ==
Onana has represented Belgium at both junior and senior levels.

=== Under–21 ===
In 2019 Onana made his debut for the Belgium U–21 team during an eight–nations tournament in Madrid, winning a bronze medal.

He was a member of the junior team at the 2021 Men's FIH Junior World Cup in Bhubaneswar.

=== Red Lions ===
Before making his junior debut, Onana earned his first senior cap in a 2019 test match against Russia. He went on to appear in the team once more that year.

Onana didn't represent the national team again until 2022, when he appeared in season three of the FIH Pro League. He has since been named permanently in the national squad.

He won his first medals with the national team in 2023, taking home bronze at the EuroHockey Championship in Mönchengladbach, as well as season four of the FIH Pro League. Now he is a basis player in the Belgian red lios.
