= Gerard Clapés =

Spanish field hockey player (born 2000)

Personal information
- Full name: Gerard Clapés Castells
- Born: 13 September 2000 (age 25)

Sport
- Sport: Field hockey
- Position: Midfielder
- Club: Oranje-Rood
Youth career
- Team
- –: Club Egara
Senior career
Years	Team	Caps	Goals
–2023	Club Egara	-	-
2023–present	Oranje-Rood	-	-
National team
Years	Team	Caps	Goals
2019–2021	Spain U21	15	(4)
2020–present	Spain (indoor)	11	(3)
2022–present	Spain	75	(6)
Medal record
World Cup
Silver medal – second place	2026 Wavre/Amstelveen
EuroHockey Championships
Bronze medal – third place	2025 Mönchengladbach
- Updated on 13 January 2024

Gerard Clapés Castells (Note: In this Spanish name, the first or paternal surname is Clapés and the second or maternal family name is Castells.) (born 13 September 2000) is a Spanish field hockey player who plays as a midfielder for Dutch Hoofdklasse club Oranje-Rood and the Spain national team.

He represented Spain at the 2024 Summer Olympics.

== Club career ==
Clapés is a product of the Club Egara youth academy. He played in the first team of Egara until 2023 when he moved to the Netherlands to play for Oranje-Rood.
