= 2025–26 Men's FIH Pro League =

- Dates: 9 December 2025 – 28 June 2026
- Teams: 9 (from 4 confederations)

Final positions
- Champions: Belgium (2nd title)
- Runner-up: England
- Third place: Australia

Tournament statistics
- Matches played: 72
- Goals scored: 366 (5.08 per match)
- Top scorer: (Argentina) Tomás Domene (21 goals)

The 2025–26 Men's FIH Pro League was the seventh edition of the Men's FIH Pro League, a field hockey championship for men's national teams. The tournament began on 9 December 2025 and finished on 28 June 2026.

Belgium won their second title.

== Format ==
The home and away principle was kept for the season, which was divided into date blocks. To assist with competition planning, international and national, several teams gathered in one venue to contest “mini-tournaments," wherein they each played two matches against one another.

If one of the two matches played between two teams was cancelled, the winner of the other match received double points.

This season winner earned direct qualification for the 2028 Summer Olympics.

== Teams ==
Following their win of the 2024–25 FIH Nations Cup, the promoted team were set with New Zealand replacing the relegated team of the last season of the 2024–25 FIH Pro League, Ireland. On 23 July 2025, New Zealand withdrew and was replaced by Pakistan who finished second in the 2024–25 Men's FIH Hockey Nations Cup.

- Argentina
- Australia
- Belgium
- England
- Germany
- India
- Netherlands
- ~~New Zealand~~
- Pakistan
- Spain

== Venues and stages ==
Following is a list of all venues and host cities across the world. Tournament hosts in parentheses.

December	February	June
Belgium; England; Germany; *Host by Ireland	England; Netherlands; Spain (host)	Germany; India; Netherlands (host)
Argentina (host); Netherlands; Pakistan	Argentina; Belgium; India (host)	Australia; Belgium (host); Netherlands; Pakistan; Spain
	Australia (host); Germany; India; Pakistan; Spain	Argentina; Australia; England (host); India; Pakistan
		Argentina; Germany (host); Spain

== Results ==
=== Standings ===
Pos	Team	Pld	W	SOW	SOL	L	GF	GA	GD	Pts	Qualification or relegation
1st place, gold medalist(s)	Belgium (C, Q)	16	13	1	1	1	59	27	+32	42	Qualified for the 2028 Summer Olympics
2nd place, silver medalist(s)	England	16	8	5	1	2	44	25	+19	35	
3rd place, bronze medalist(s)	Australia	16	9	1	1	5	40	31	+9	30	
4	Netherlands	16	7	0	5	4	47	37	+10	26	
5	Argentina	16	6	2	2	6	45	41	+4	24	
6	Germany	16	5	3	0	8	39	46	−7	21	
7	Spain	16	5	1	2	8	39	41	−2	19	
8	India	16	4	2	3	7	31	39	−8	19	
9	Pakistan (R)	16	0	0	0	16	22	79	−57	0	Relegated to 2026–27 FIH Nations Cup

Source: FIH
Rules for classification: 1) points; 2) matches won; 3) goal difference; 4) goals for; 5) head-to-head result; 6) field goals scored.
(C) Champion; (Q) Qualified to the phase indicated; (R) Relegated

=== Fixtures ===
9 December 2025
11:30

Germany	1–4	Belgium
Kaufmann 37'	Report	Boon 14'; Crols 19', 33'; Hendrickx 48'

Sport Ireland Campus, Dublin
Umpires:
You Hyo-sik (KOR)
Łukasz Zwierzchowski (POL)

9 December 2025
19:00

Netherlands	5–2	Pakistan
Bijen 12'; Boers 15', 44'; Reyenga 36'; Telgenkamp 41'	Report	Shahid 9'; Khan 18'

Polideportivo Provincial, Santiago del Estero
Umpires:
Michael Dutrieux (BEL)
Jonathan Altamirano (MEX)

10 December 2025
11:30

England	1–4	Germany
Bandurak 16'	Report	Poljaric 7'; Weigand 23'; Mertgens 41'; Mazkour 60'

Sport Ireland Campus, Dublin
Umpires:
Gemma Calderón (ESP)
Jonas van 't Hek (NED)

10 December 2025
19:00

Argentina	1–1	Netherlands
L. Toscani 40'	Report	Brinkman 12'
Penalties
Casella (penalty shoot-out missed); T. Domene (penalty shoot-out scored); L. Toscani (penalty shoot-out scored); Méndez (penalty shoot-out scored); Capurro (penalty shoot-out scored)	4–2	(penalty shoot-out scored) Croon; (penalty shoot-out missed) De Mol; (penalty shoot-out missed) Brinkman; (penalty shoot-out scored) Van Dam

Polideportivo Provincial, Santiago del Estero
Umpires:
Sean Rapaport (RSA)
Jonathan von Hoesslin (RSA)

11 December 2025
11:30

Belgium	2–2	England
Van Dessel 47'; Onana 53'	Report	Croft 15'; Payton 60'
Penalties
Wegnez (penalty shoot-out missed); Duvekot (penalty shoot-out scored); De Sloover (penalty shoot-out missed); Van Dessel (penalty shoot-out scored); Hellin (penalty shoot-out missed)	2–3	(penalty shoot-out missed) Williamson; (penalty shoot-out missed) Albery; (penalty shoot-out scored) Waller; (penalty shoot-out scored) Wallace; (penalty shoot-out scored) Sorsby

Sport Ireland Campus, Dublin
Umpires:
Jonas van 't Hek (NED)
Lizelotte Wolter (NED)

11 December 2025
19:00

Argentina	3–2	Pakistan
T. Domene 19'; Della Torre 41'; Casella 42'	Report	Ammad 36'; Wal. Rana 45+'

Polideportivo Provincial, Santiago del Estero
Umpires:
Sean Rapaport (RSA)
Michael Dutrieux (BEL)

12 December 2025
11:30

Belgium	4–1	Germany
Hendrickx 6', 25'; Crols 26'; Boon 50'	Report	Hellwig 59'

Sport Ireland Campus, Dublin
Umpires:
Jonas van 't Hek (NED)
You Hyo-sik (KOR)

12 December 2025
19:00

Pakistan	3–7	Netherlands
Khan 39', 60'; Wah. Rana 55'	Report	Van Dam 17'; Brinkman 22', 45'; Jansen 23', 51'; Boers 52'; Croon 59'

Polideportivo Provincial, Santiago del Estero
Umpires:
Sean Rapaport (RSA)
Jonathan Altamirano (MEX)

13 December 2025
11:30

Germany	1–4	England
Schwarzhaupt 56'	Report	Gall 34'; Croft 46'; Hooper 49'; Bandurak 56'

Sport Ireland Campus, Dublin
Umpires:
Sandra Adell (ESP)
Jonas van 't Hek (NED)

13 December 2025
19:00

Argentina	3–2	Netherlands
T. Domene 17', 30+'; Casella 27'	Report	Telgenkamp 33'; Reyenga 60'

Polideportivo Provincial, Santiago del Estero
Umpires:
Sean Rapaport (RSA)
Jonathan von Hoesslin (RSA)

14 December 2025
11:00

England	2–3	Belgium
Park 10'; Calnan 34'	Report	Hendrickx 17'; Boon 23', 40'

Sport Ireland Campus, Dublin
Umpires:
You Hyo-sik (KOR)
Łukasz Zwierzchowski (POL)

14 December 2025
19:00

Argentina	5–1	Pakistan
Della Torre 7'; Capurro 15', 21'; Martins 37'; T. Domene 39'	Report	Wah. Rana 34'

Polideportivo Provincial, Santiago del Estero
Umpires:
Michael Dutrieux (BEL)
Jonathan von Hoesslin (RSA)

5 February 2026
11:00

Spain	3–4	Netherlands
Vizcaino 10'; Pe. Cunill 15'; N. Álvarez 60'	Report	Van der Heijden 27'; Van Dam 42'; Brinkman 48'; Reyenga 59'

Estadio Beteró, Valencia
Umpires:
Ahmed El-Sayed (EGY)
Alex Miles (CAN)

6 February 2026
11:00

England	2–2	Netherlands
Wallace 8'; Hooper 10'	Report	Reyenga 22'; Bukkens 57'
Penalties
Calnan (penalty shoot-out scored); Rushmere (penalty shoot-out scored); Albery (penalty shoot-out missed); Wallace (penalty shoot-out scored)	3–1	(penalty shoot-out missed) Bukkens; (penalty shoot-out scored) Croon; (penalty shoot-out missed) Brinkman; (penalty shoot-out missed) van Dam

Estadio Beteró, Valencia
Umpires:
Wanri Venter (RSA)
Allison Mikelson (USA)

7 February 2026
11:00

Spain	1–3	England
M. Miralles 18'	Report	Waller 3'; Bandurak 24'; Ward 53'

Estadio Beteró, Valencia
Umpires:
Sarah Wilson (SCO)
Victoria Pazos (PAR)

8 February 2026
11:00

Spain	2–3	Netherlands
Basterra 36'; Abajo 39'	Report	Van der Heijden 24'; Telgenkamp 25', 58'

Estadio Beteró, Valencia
Umpires:
Wanri Venter (RSA)
Alex Miles (CAN)

9 February 2026
11:00

Netherlands	2–2	England
Jansen 23'; De Geus 34'	Report	Croft 28', 60'
Penalties
Reyenga (penalty shoot-out scored); Telgenkamp (penalty shoot-out missed); De Mol (penalty shoot-out missed); Middendorp (penalty shoot-out missed); Reyenga (penalty shoot-out scored); Van Dam (penalty shoot-out scored); Van Dam (penalty shoot-out missed)	3–4	(penalty shoot-out missed) Calnan; (penalty shoot-out missed) Rushmere; (penalty shoot-out scored) Albery; (penalty shoot-out missed) Wallace; (penalty shoot-out scored) Wallace; (penalty shoot-out scored) Payton; (penalty shoot-out scored) Albery

Estadio Beteró, Valencia
Umpires:
Sarah Wilson (SCO)
Victoria Pazos (PAR)

10 February 2026
09:00

Spain	2–4	England
Basterra 28', 38'	Report	Payton 4'; Ward 26', 59'; Rushmere 42'

Estadio Beteró, Valencia
Umpires:
Wanri Venter (RSA)
Sarah Wilson (SCO)

10 February 2026
17:30

Australia	3–2	Pakistan
Brand 2', 19'; Govers 58'	Report	Nadeem 49'; Khan 53'

Tasmanian Hockey Centre, Hobart
Umpires:
Bevan Nichol (NZL)
Benjamin Peters (USA)

10 February 2026
19:30

Belgium	5–3	Argentina
Boon 15', 30', 58'; Hellin 32'; Hendrickx 53'	Report	T. Domene 2', 24'; Della Torre 9'

Birsa Munda International Hockey Stadium, Rourkela
Umpires:
Sean Edwards (ENG)
Kristy Robertson (AUS)

11 February 2026
17:30

Pakistan	2–5	Germany
Ammad 18'; Khan 57'	Report	Rühr 6'; Grambusch 17'; Schwarzhaupt 25'; Hellwig 41'; Hartkopf 42'

Tasmanian Hockey Centre, Hobart
Umpires:
Bruce Bale (ENG)
Benjamin Peters (USA)

11 February 2026
19:30

India	1–3	Belgium
Lakra 29'	Report	Onana 23'; Crols 53'; Van Dessel 57'

Birsa Munda International Hockey Stadium, Rourkela
Umpires:
Paul van den Assum (NED)
Tim Meissner (GER)

12 February 2026
17:30

Australia	3–0	Germany
Rintala 10'; Geddes 18'; Marais 37'	Report

Tasmanian Hockey Centre, Hobart
Umpires:
Bevan Nichol (NZL)
Bruce Bale (ENG)

12 February 2026
19:30

India	0–8	Argentina
	Report	Ruiz 14'; T. Domene 15', 20', 26', 60'; Méndez 22'; Ibarra 25'; Della Torre 30'

Birsa Munda International Hockey Stadium, Rourkela
Umpires:
Paul van den Assum (NED)
Sean Edwards (ENG)

13 February 2026
17:30

Australia	3–0	Pakistan
Govers 14', 34'; Welch 42'	Report

Tasmanian Hockey Centre, Hobart
Umpires:
Bruce Bale (ENG)
Benjamin Peters (USA)

13 February 2026
19:30

Argentina	2–5	Belgium
T. Domene 19'; Rey 45'	Report	De Sloover 36'; Biekens 39'; Hendrickx 49', 54'; Duvekot 55'

Birsa Munda International Hockey Stadium, Rourkela
Umpires:
Kristy Robertson (AUS)
Tim Meissner (GER)

14 February 2026
15:30

Germany	6–1	Pakistan
Sperling 26'; Warweg 28', 36'; Ludwig 30'; Mertgens 32'; Hartkopf 54'	Report	Rana 18'

Tasmanian Hockey Centre, Hobart
Umpires:
Bruce Bale (ENG)
Bevan Nichol (NZL)

14 February 2026
19:30

India	2–4	Belgium
Lalage 24'; Harmanpreet 37'	Report	Labouchere 11'; Hendrickx 14', 17'; De Sloover 15'

Birsa Munda International Hockey Stadium, Rourkela
Umpires:
Kristy Robertson (AUS)
Sean Edwards (ENG)

15 February 2026
15:30

Australia	3–2	Germany
Welch 8'; Govers 18'; Brand 47'	Report	Brilla 10', 16'

Tasmanian Hockey Centre, Hobart
Umpires:
Bevan Nichol (NZL)
Benjamin Peters (USA)

15 February 2026
19:30

India	2–4	Argentina
Lalage 50'; Sanjay 59'	Report	T. Domene 18'; Marcucci 28', 49'; Méndez 43'

Birsa Munda International Hockey Stadium, Rourkela
Umpires:
Paul van den Assum (NED)
Tim Meissner (GER)

20 February 2026
19:30

Australia	3–1	Spain
Welch 3', 58'; Rintala 16'	Report	Álvarez 53'

Tasmanian Hockey Centre, Hobart
Umpires:
David Tomlinson (NZL)
Sophie Bockelmann (GER)

21 February 2026
17:30

India	0–2	Spain
	Report	Abajo 6'; Cobos 36'

Tasmanian Hockey Centre, Hobart
Umpires:
David Tomlinson (NZL)
Ben Grant (NZL)

22 February 2026
17:30

Australia	2–2	India
Rintala 47', 56'	Report	Rohidas 15'; Jugraj 43'
Penalties
Brand (penalty shoot-out scored); Henderson (penalty shoot-out scored); Howard (penalty shoot-out scored); Welch (penalty shoot-out scored); Craig (penalty shoot-out scored)	5–4	(penalty shoot-out scored) Lakra; (penalty shoot-out scored) Maninder; (penalty shoot-out scored) Pal; (penalty shoot-out scored) Jugraj; (penalty shoot-out missed) Aditya

Tasmanian Hockey Centre, Hobart
Umpires:
Ben Grant (NZL)
Junko Wagatsuma (JPN)

23 February 2026
19:30

Australia	3–0	Spain
Rintala 1'; Hayward 36'; Craig 44'	Report

Tasmanian Hockey Centre, Hobart
Umpires:
Ben Grant (NZL)
David Tomlinson (NZL)

24 February 2026
19:30

Spain	1–1	India
Font 59'	Report	Maninder 19'
Penalties
Bonastre (penalty shoot-out scored); Recasens (penalty shoot-out scored); Cabré-Verdiell (penalty shoot-out scored); Font (penalty shoot-out scored)	4–3	(penalty shoot-out scored) Lakra; (penalty shoot-out scored) Maninder; (penalty shoot-out missed) Abhishek; (penalty shoot-out scored) Pal; (penalty shoot-out missed) Hardik

Tasmanian Hockey Centre, Hobart
Umpires:
David Tomlinson (NZL)
Rebecca Edwards (ENG)

25 February 2026
19:30

Australia	1–1	India
Hayward 49'	Report	Lakra 51'
Penalties
Brand (penalty shoot-out missed); Henderson (penalty shoot-out missed); Burns (penalty shoot-out missed); Hayward (penalty shoot-out scored)	1–3	(penalty shoot-out scored) Lakra; (penalty shoot-out scored) Maninder; (penalty shoot-out missed) Abhishek; (penalty shoot-out scored) Vishnukant

Tasmanian Hockey Centre, Hobart
Umpires:
Lani Nichol (NZL)
Ben Grant (NZL)

13 June 2026
12:30

England	5–0	Argentina
Croft 18', 58'; Ward 41'; Bandurak 47'; Sorsby 58'	Report

Lee Valley Hockey and Tennis Centre, London
Umpires:
Ayden Shrives (RSA)
Paul van den Assum (NED)

13 June 2026
15:30

Belgium	7–1	Pakistan
Onana 3'; Stockbroekx 38'; Hendrickx 42'; Biekens 50', 55'; Hellin 51'; Boon 55'	Report	Wah. Rana 33'

Stade Justin Peeters, Wavre
Umpires:
Sean Edwards (ENG)
Ben Grant (NZL)

13 June 2026
16:00

Netherlands	2–2	Germany
Janssen 54'; Telgenkamp 54'	Report	Hellwig 25'; Schwarzhaupt 48'
Penalties
Bukkens (penalty shoot-out missed); Brinkman (penalty shoot-out missed); Middendorp (penalty shoot-out missed); Veen (penalty shoot-out missed); Janssen (penalty shoot-out missed)	0–1	(penalty shoot-out missed) Weigand; (penalty shoot-out missed) Struthoff; (penalty shoot-out scored) Rühr; (penalty shoot-out missed) Warweg

Hazelaarweg Stadion, Rotterdam
Umpires:
Dan Barstow (ENG)
Aleisha Neumann (AUS)

14 June 2026
12:30

England	4–3	Australia
Calnan 40'; Goodfield 42'; Sorsby 48'; Hooper 55'	Report	Ephraums 13', 57'; Willott 58'

Lee Valley Hockey and Tennis Centre, London
Umpires:
Ivona Makar (CRO)
Paul van den Assum (NED)

14 June 2026
15:30

Pakistan	1–5	Spain
Mahmood 43'	Report	Álvarez 11', 52'; Cunill 23', 30'; Reyne 48'

Stade Justin Peeters, Wavre
Umpires:
James Unkles (AUS)
Daniël Veerman (NED)

14 June 2026
16:00

Netherlands	3–2	India
Bukkens 3'; Bijen 23'; Reyenga 40'	Report	Dilpreet 10'; Sukhjeet 33'

Hazelaarweg Stadion, Rotterdam
Umpires:
Rawi Anbananthan (MAS)
Tamara Leonard (AUS)

16 June 2026
21:00

Belgium	3–1	Spain
Boon 32'; Hendrickx 44'; Stockbroekx 47'	Report	Vizcaino 33'

Stade Justin Peeters, Wavre
Umpires:
James Unkles (AUS)
Ben Grant (NZL)

17 June 2026
17:00

Australia	1–2	Argentina
Willott 29'	Report	T. Domene 40', 57'

Lee Valley Hockey and Tennis Centre, London
Umpires:
Alison Keogh (IRL)
Lisette Baljon (NED)

17 June 2026
19:30

India	3–1	Germany
Mandeep 7'; Lakra 13'; Nilakanta 35'	Report	Hartkopf 45'

Hazelaarweg Stadion, Rotterdam
Umpires:
Jayden Pearson (AUS)
Tamara Leonard (AUS)

18 June 2026
17:00

Argentina	2–3	Australia
T. Domene 2'; L. Domene 6'	Report	Ephraums 26', 59'; Craig 50'

Lee Valley Hockey and Tennis Centre, London
Umpires:
Paul van den Assum (NED)
Lorijn de Kraker (NED)

18 June 2026
19:30

Germany	2–1	India
Weigand 56'; Brilla 60'	Report	Jugraj 38'

Hazelaarweg Stadion, Rotterdam
Umpires:
Juan Pedro Rodríguez (ARG)
Rawi Anbananthan (MAS)

18 June 2026
21:00

Belgium	6–0	Pakistan
De Kerpel 1'; Boon 17', 23', 46'; Foubert 41'; Labouchere 50'	Report

Stade Justin Peeters, Wavre
Umpires:
Lizelotte Wolter (NED)
James Unkles (AUS)

20 June 2026
12:30

England	1–1	Argentina
Bandurak 45'	Report	T. Domene 50'
Penalties
Calnan (penalty shoot-out scored); Albery (penalty shoot-out scored); Rushmere (penalty shoot-out scored)	3–1	(penalty shoot-out scored) Méndez; (penalty shoot-out missed) T. Domene; (penalty shoot-out missed) L. Toscani; (penalty shoot-out missed) Martins

Lee Valley Hockey and Tennis Centre, London
Umpires:
Alison Keogh (IRL)
Ayden Shrives (RSA)

20 June 2026
15:30

Netherlands	5–3	Germany
De Vilder 2'; Janssen 13', 14'; Brinkman 31'; Telgenkamp 56'	Report	Warweg 24'; Hellwig 35'; Hinrichs 59'

Hazelaarweg Stadion, Rotterdam
Umpires:
Aleisha Neumann (AUS)
Dan Barstow (ENG)

20 June 2026
15:30

Spain	4–2	Pakistan
Cunill 29'; Alonso 35'; Álvarez 43', 51'	Report	Mahmood 28', 44'

Stade Justin Peeters, Wavre
Umpires:
Maggie Giddens (USA)
Daniël Veerman (NED)

21 June 2026
11:30

England	3–1	Australia
Bandurak 40', 47'; Gall 56'	Report	Geddes 41'

Lee Valley Hockey and Tennis Centre, London
Umpires:
Ivona Makar (CRO)
Ayden Shrives (RSA)

21 June 2026
14:00

Netherlands	2–3	India
Van der Heijden 19'; Bijen 59'	Report	Jugraj 18'; Abhishek 27'; Rajinder 56'

Hazelaarweg Stadion, Rotterdam
Umpires:
Juan Pedro Rodríguez (ARG)
Jayden Pearson (AUS)

21 June 2026
14:00

Belgium	3–2	Spain
Stockbroekx 35'; Hendrickx 42'; Boon 56'	Report	Basterra 43'; Fortuño 54'

Stade Justin Peeters, Wavre
Umpires:
James Unkles (AUS)
Sean Edwards (ENG)

23 June 2026
14:30

Pakistan	3–4	India
Nadeem 8'; Mahmood 53'; Shakeel 60'	Report	Abhishek 22'; Nilakanta 24'; Sukhjeet 40'; Rajinder 52'

Lee Valley Hockey and Tennis Centre, London
Umpires:
Coen van Bunge (NED)
Lim Hong-Zhen (SGP)

23 June 2026
17:30

Argentina	2–3	Spain
T. Domene 7'; Della Torre 46'	Report	Basterra 22'; Recasens 27'; Cunill 33'

Ernst-Reuter Sportfeld, Berlin
Umpires:
Jonathan von Hoesslin (RSA)
Timothy Sheahan (AUS)

23 June 2026
18:00

Australia	2–0	Netherlands
Brand 14'; Hayward 31'	Report

Stade Justin Peeters, Wavre
Umpires:
Darren Hubach (RSA)
Raphaël Adrien (GER)

24 June 2026
13:30

England	2–1	Pakistan
Roper 40'; Hooper 46'	Report	Wah. Rana 27'

Lee Valley Hockey and Tennis Centre, London
Umpires:
Sarah Wilson (SCO)
Lim Hong-Zhen (SGP)

24 June 2026
20:30

Germany	2–1	Argentina
Weigand 26', 59'	Report	Ferreiro 45'

Ernst-Reuter Sportfeld, Berlin
Umpires:
Laurine Delforge (BEL)
Steven Bakker (NED)

24 June 2026
21:00

Belgium	2–2	Netherlands
Hendrickx 3'; Boon 53'	Report	Van der Heijden 15', 16'
Penalties
Boon (penalty shoot-out missed); De Sloover (penalty shoot-out scored); Wegnez (penalty shoot-out scored); Van Dessel (penalty shoot-out scored); Van Oost (penalty shoot-out scored)	4–3	(penalty shoot-out missed) De Mol; (penalty shoot-out missed) De Geus; (penalty shoot-out scored) Middendorp; (penalty shoot-out scored) Veen; (penalty shoot-out scored) Reyenga

Stade Justin Peeters, Wavre
Umpires:
Gareth Greenfield (NZL)
Darren Hubach (RSA)

25 June 2026
19:30

England	2–2	India
Goodfield 29'; Bandurak 56'	Report	Dilpreet 10', 58'
Penalties
Sorsby (penalty shoot-out scored); Albery (penalty shoot-out scored); Wallace (penalty shoot-out scored); Wallace (penalty shoot-out scored)	4–1	(penalty shoot-out scored) Harmanpreet; (penalty shoot-out missed) Sukhjeet; (penalty shoot-out missed) Vivek

Lee Valley Hockey and Tennis Centre, London
Umpires:
Coen van Bunge (NED)
Sarah Wilson (SCO)

25 June 2026
20:30

Germany	3–3	Spain
Müller 36'; Grambusch 50'; Schwarzhaupt 54'	Report	Font 14'; Fortuño 46'; Cunill 60'
Penalties
Prinz (penalty shoot-out missed); Rühr (penalty shoot-out scored); Struthoff (penalty shoot-out scored); Hartkopf (penalty shoot-out scored)	3–1	(penalty shoot-out scored) Gispert; (penalty shoot-out missed) Bonastre; (penalty shoot-out missed) Miralles; (penalty shoot-out missed) Font

Ernst-Reuter Sportfeld, Berlin
Umpires:
Timothy Sheahan (AUS)
Steven Bakker (NED)

25 June 2026
21:00

Belgium	1–2	Australia
Boon 32'	Report	Welch 36'; Ephraums 50'

Stade Justin Peeters, Wavre
Umpires:
Gareth Greenfield (NZL)
Raphaël Adrien (GER)

26 June 2026
17:30

Spain	4–4	Argentina
Basterra 24', 25'; Álvarez 34', 57'	Report	T. Domene 1', 39'; Della Torre 43'; Tarazona 58'
Penalties
Gispert (penalty shoot-out missed); Bonastre (penalty shoot-out scored); Miralles (penalty shoot-out missed); Font (penalty shoot-out missed)	1–3	(penalty shoot-out scored) Méndez; (penalty shoot-out missed) Ferreiro; (penalty shoot-out scored) T. Domene; (penalty shoot-out missed) T. Domene; (penalty shoot-out scored) Toscani

Ernst-Reuter Sportfeld, Berlin
Umpires:
Michiel Otten (NED)
Jonathan von Hoesslin (RSA)

26 June 2026
18:00

India	7–1	Pakistan
Sukhjeet 20'; Harmanpreet 26'; Hardik 34'; Jugraj 35'; Abhishek 41'; Pal 44'; Dilpreet 54'	Report	Mahmood 13'

Lee Valley Hockey and Tennis Centre, London
Umpires:
Magali Sergeant (BEL)
Coen van Bunge (NED)

26 June 2026
21:00

Netherlands	6–3	Australia
Janssen 12', 60'; Telgenkamp 17', 23'; De Vilder 25'; Reyenga 45'	Report	Willott 20'; Ephraums 52'; Howard 59'

Stade Justin Peeters, Wavre
Umpires:
Darren Hubach (RSA)
Rachel Williams (ENG)

27 June 2026
13:30

Germany	4–4	Argentina
Schwarzhaupt 11'; Brilla 13'; Weigand 55', 60'	Report	Della Torre 15'; T. Domene 28', 34'; Ferreiro 41'
Penalties
Struthoff (penalty shoot-out missed); Weigand (penalty shoot-out scored); Hayner (penalty shoot-out scored); Prinz (penalty shoot-out missed)	2–1	(penalty shoot-out scored) T. Domene; (penalty shoot-out missed) Ibarra; (penalty shoot-out missed) L. Toscani; (penalty shoot-out missed) Ferreiro; (penalty shoot-out missed) J. Toscani

Ernst-Reuter Sportfeld, Berlin
Umpires:
Michiel Otten (NED)
Timothy Sheahan (AUS)

27 June 2026
16:00

England	7–0	Pakistan
Ward 9'; Bandurak 15', 48'; Taylor 22'; Hooper 38'; Wallace 49'; Croft 52'	Report

Lee Valley Hockey and Tennis Centre, London
Umpires:
Sophie Bockelmann (GER)
Coen van Bunge (NED)

27 June 2026
19:00

Belgium	2–1	Netherlands
Hendrickx 15+'; Boon 17'	Report	Reyenga 36'

Stade Justin Peeters, Wavre
Umpires:
Gareth Greenfield (NZL)
Raphaël Adrien (GER)

28 June 2026
12:30

Germany	2–5	Spain
Hellwig 8'; Brilla 58'	Report	Zaldua 29'; Cunill 30', 57'; Basterra 34', 42'

Ernst-Reuter Sportfeld, Berlin
Umpires:
Michiel Otten (NED)
Laurine Delforge (BEL)

28 June 2026
16:00

England	0–0	India
	Report
Penalties
Wallace (penalty shoot-out scored); Sorsby (penalty shoot-out missed); Croft (penalty shoot-out missed); Goodfield (penalty shoot-out scored); Waller (penalty shoot-out missed)	2–3	(penalty shoot-out missed) Sukhjeet; (penalty shoot-out scored) Abhishek; (penalty shoot-out scored) Lakra; (penalty shoot-out scored) Hardik; (penalty shoot-out missed) Dilpreet

Lee Valley Hockey and Tennis Centre, London
Umpires:
Lim Hong-Zhen (SGP)
Sarah Wilson (SCO)

28 June 2026
17:00

Belgium	5–4	Australia
Crols 30'; Boon 39', 50', 54'; Hendrickx 42'	Report	H. Beltz 8'; Burns 11'; Brand 14'; Welch 29'

Stade Justin Peeters, Wavre
Umpires:
Raphaël Adrien (GER)
Darren Hubach (RSA)

== Goalscorers ==
There were 366 goals scored in 72 matches, for an average of 5.08 goals per match.

21 goals

- (Argentina) Tomás Domene

19 goals

- (Belgium) Tom Boon

15 goals

- (Belgium) Alexander Hendrickx

10 goals

- (England) Nick Bandurak

9 goals

- (Spain) José Basterra

8 goals

- (Netherlands) Duco Telgenkamp
- (Spain) Pepe Cunill

7 goals

- (England) Henry Croft
- (Netherlands) Tijmen Reyenga
- (Spain) Nicolás Álvarez
- (Argentina) Nicolás Della Torre

6 goals

- (Australia) Nathan Ephraums
- (Australia) Jack Welch
- (England) Sam Hooper
- (Germany) Justus Weigand

5 goals

- (Australia) Tim Brand
- (Australia) Joel Rintala
- (Belgium) Thomas Crols
- (England) Samuel Ward
- (Germany) Jakob Brilla
- (Germany) Malte Hellwig
- (Germany) Benedikt Schwarzhaupt
- (Netherlands) Thierry Brinkman
- (Netherlands) Pepijn van der Heijden
- (Netherlands) Jip Janssen
- (Pakistan) Sufyan Khan
- (Pakistan) Abu Mahmood
- (Pakistan) Waheed Rana

4 goals

- (Australia) Blake Govers
- (India) Dilpreet Singh
- (India) Jugraj Singh
- (Netherlands) Koen Bijen

3 goals

- (Australia) Jeremy Hayward
- (Australia) Ky Willott
- (Belgium) Tobias Biekens
- (Belgium) Nelson Onana
- (Belgium) Thibeau Stockbroekx
- (Germany) Raphael Hartkopf
- (Germany) Justus Warweg
- (India) Shilanand Lakra
- (India) Abhishek Nain
- (India) Sukhjeet Singh
- (Netherlands) Timo Boers
- (Netherlands) Guus Jansen

2 goals

- (Argentina) Bautista Capurro
- (Argentina) Maico Casella
- (Argentina) Martin Ferreiro
- (Argentina) Tadeo Marcucci
- (Argentina) Lucio Méndez
- (Australia) Tom Craig
- (Australia) Cambell Geddes
- (Belgium) Arno Van Dessel
- (Belgium) Guillaume Hellin
- (Belgium) Hugo Labouchere
- (Belgium) Arthur De Sloover
- (England) Will Calnan
- (England) James Gall
- (England) David Goodfield
- (England) Jacob Payton
- (England) Tom Sorsby
- (England) Zachary Wallace
- (Germany) Tom Grambusch
- (Germany) Henrik Mertgens
- (India) Aditya Lalage
- (India) Nilakanta Sharma
- (India) Harmanpreet Singh
- (India) Rajinder Singh
- (Netherlands) Miles Bukkens
- (Netherlands) Thijs van Dam
- (Netherlands) Derck de Vilder
- (Pakistan) Nadeem Ahmad
- (Pakistan) Muhammad Ammad
- (Spain) Ignacio Abajo
- (Spain) Bruno Font
- (Spain) Guillermo Fortuño
- (Spain) Marc Vizcaino

1 goal

- (Argentina) Lautaro Domene
- (Argentina) Ignacio Ibarra
- (Argentina) Tobías Martins
- (Argentina) Matías Rey
- (Argentina) Tomás Ruiz
- (Argentina) Santiago Tarazona
- (Argentina) Lucas Toscani
- (Australia) Hayden Beltz
- (Australia) Cooper Burns
- (Australia) Tim Howard
- (Australia) Craig Marais
- (Belgium) Roman Duvekot
- (Belgium) Nicolas De Kerpel
- (Belgium) Victor Foubert
- (England) Nicholas Park
- (England) Phil Roper
- (England) Stuart Rushmere
- (England) Sam Taylor
- (England) Jack Waller
- (Germany) Teo Hinrichs
- (Germany) Paul-Philipp Kaufmann
- (Germany) Moritz Ludwig
- (Germany) Elian Mazkour
- (Germany) Linus Müller
- (Germany) Matteo Poljaric
- (Germany) Christopher Rühr
- (Germany) Florian Sperling
- (India) Raj Kumar Pal
- (India) Sanjay Rana
- (India) Amit Rohidas
- (India) Hardik Singh
- (India) Mandeep Singh
- (India) Maninder Singh
- (Netherlands) Jorrit Croon
- (Netherlands) Jonas de Geus
- (Pakistan) Hannan Shahid
- (Pakistan) Moin Shakeel
- (Spain) Alejandro Alonso
- (Spain) Ignacio Cobos
- (Spain) Marc Miralles
- (Spain) Marc Recasens
- (Spain) Marc Reyne
- (Spain) Iñaky Zaldua

Source: FIH

== See also ==
- 2025–26 Women's FIH Pro League
