= Germany men's national field hockey team =

Field hockey team representing Germany

Germany
- Nickname(s): Honamas
- Association: Deutscher Hockey-Bund (German Hockey Federation)
- Confederation: EHF (Europe)
- Head Coach: André Henning
- Assistant coach(es): Andreu Enrich; Pasha Gademan; James Lewis
- Manager: Eric Langner
- Captain: Mats Grambusch
- Most caps: Matthias Witthaus; Philipp Crone (327)
- Top scorer: Björn Michel (229)
Home	Away

FIH ranking
- Current: 1 (4 October 2026)

Olympic Games
- Appearances: 20 (first in 1908)
- Best result: (gold) 1st (1972, 1992, 2008, 2012)

World Cup
- Appearances: 16 (first in 1971)
- Best result: (gold) 1st (2002, 2006, 2023, 2026)

EuroHockey Championships
- Appearances: 20 (first in 1970)
- Best result: (gold) 1st (1970, 1978, 1991, 1995, 1999, 2003, 2011, 2013, 2025)
Medal record
Event	1st	2nd	3rd
Olympic Games	4	4	4
World Cup	4	2	4
EuroHockey Championship	9	4	3
Champions Trophy	10	7	7
Pro League	0	0	1
Total	27	17	19
Olympic Games
Gold medal – first place	1972 Munich	Team
Gold medal – first place	1992 Barcelona	Team
Gold medal – first place	2008 Beijing	Team
Gold medal – first place	2012 London	Team
Silver medal – second place	1936 Berlin	Team
Silver medal – second place	1984 Los Angeles	Team
Silver medal – second place	1988 Seoul	Team
Silver medal – second place	2024 Paris	Team
Bronze medal – third place	1928 Amsterdam	Team
Bronze medal – third place	1956 Melbourne	Team
Bronze medal – third place	2004 Athens	Team
Bronze medal – third place	2016 Rio de Janeiro	Team
World Cup
Gold medal – first place	2002 Kuala Lumpur	
Gold medal – first place	2006 Mönchengladbach	
Gold medal – first place	2023 Bhubaneswar/Rourkela	
Gold medal – first place	2026 Wavre/Amstelveen	
Silver medal – second place	1982 Bombay	
Silver medal – second place	2010 New Delhi	
Bronze medal – third place	1973 Amstelveen	
Bronze medal – third place	1975 Kuala Lumpur	
Bronze medal – third place	1986 London	
Bronze medal – third place	1998 Utrecht	
EuroHockey Championship
Gold medal – first place	1970 Brussels	
Gold medal – first place	1978 Hanover	
Gold medal – first place	1991 Paris	
Gold medal – first place	1995 Dublin	
Gold medal – first place	1999 Padua	
Gold medal – first place	2003 Barcelona	
Gold medal – first place	2011 Mönchengladbach	
Gold medal – first place	2013 Boom	
Gold medal – first place	2025 Mönchengladbach	
Silver medal – second place	1974 Madrid	
Silver medal – second place	2009 Amstelveen	
Silver medal – second place	2015 London	
Silver medal – second place	2021 Amstelveen	
Bronze medal – third place	1983 Amsterdam	
Bronze medal – third place	1987 Moscow	
Bronze medal – third place	2005 Leipzig	
Champions Trophy
Gold medal – first place	1986 Karachi	
Gold medal – first place	1987 Amstelveen	
Gold medal – first place	1988 Lahore	
Gold medal – first place	1991 Berlin	
Gold medal – first place	1992 Karachi	
Gold medal – first place	1995 Berlin	
Gold medal – first place	1997 Adelaide	
Gold medal – first place	2001 Rotterdam	
Gold medal – first place	2007 Kuala Lumpur	
Gold medal – first place	2014 Bhubaneswar	
Silver medal – second place	1980 Karachi	
Silver medal – second place	1993 Kuala Lumpur	
Silver medal – second place	1994 Lahore	
Silver medal – second place	2000 Amstelveen	
Silver medal – second place	2002 Cologne	
Silver medal – second place	2006 Terrassa	
Silver medal – second place	2009 Melbourne	
Bronze medal – third place	1981 Karachi	
Bronze medal – third place	1983 Karachi	
Bronze medal – third place	1985 Perth	
Bronze medal – third place	1989 West Berlin	
Bronze medal – third place	1990 Melbourne	
Bronze medal – third place	1996 Madras	
Bronze medal – third place	2016 London	

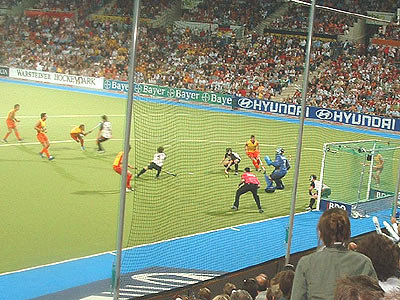
Semifinal match 2006 between Germany and Spain

The Germany men's national field hockey team is one of the most successful sides in the world, winning gold at the Summer Olympics four times (including once as West Germany), the Hockey World Cup 4 times, the EuroHockey Nations Championship nine times (including twice as West Germany) and the Hockey Champions Trophy ten times (including three times as West Germany).

== History ==
The team caused an upset in the 2002 Men's Hockey World Cup when they defeated Australia 2–1 with striker Olivier Domke scoring the winner after Germany came back from being 1–0 down. After this period the Germans went through a transition period, finishing lowly in the 2003 Men's Hockey Champions Trophy and the 2004 Men's Hockey Champions Trophy with several inexperienced players in their squad. Coach Bernhard Peters was looking to nurture the players for the World Cup such as Christopher Zeller, Moritz Fürste and Timo Wess, and was successful as the Germans won the 2006 Men's Hockey World Cup in Mönchengladbach, defeating Australia 4–3 in the final. Bernhard Peters left the team in order to pursue a career in football and is now a staff member at TSG 1899 Hoffenheim.

On 6 November 2006, Markus Wiese was appointed as the new head coach. Success at the 2007 Men's Hockey Champions Trophy and a gold medal at the 2008 Beijing Olympics followed this. Germany headed into the 2010 Men's Hockey World Cup with a largely young and inexperienced squad but reached the final of the World Cup after strong performances throughout the tournament. In the final, they were defeated 2–1 by Australia.

Germany has played in the annual 2011 Hockey Champions Trophy held in Auckland, New Zealand. The team competed in pool B with Korea, Netherlands and host nation New Zealand. The team finished fifth in the tournament.

== Competitive record ==
=== Summer Olympics ===
- 1908–1952 as → → → Germany
- 1956–1964 as United Team of Germany
- 1968–1988 as West Germany
- 1992–present as Germany

Summer Olympics record
Year	Round	Position	Pld	W	D*	L	GF	GA	Squad
(United Kingdom) 1908	5th place game	5th	2	1	0	1	1	4	Squad
(Belgium) 1920	did not participate								
(Netherlands) 1928	3rd place game	3rd	4	3	0	1	11	3	Squad
(United States) 1932	did not participate								
(Nazi Germany) 1936	Final	2nd	4	3	0	1	14	9	Squad
(United Kingdom) 1948	did not participate								
(Finland) 1952	5th place game	5th	5	4	0	1	20	4	Squad
(Australia) 1956	3rd place game	3rd	5	2	2	1	8	6	Squad
(Italy) 1960	Quarter-finals	7th	5	2	0	3	11	4	Squad
(Japan) 1964	5th place game	5th	9	4	5	0	17	5	Squad
(Mexico) 1968	3rd place game	4th	9	5	1	3	16	8	Squad
(West Germany) 1972	Final	1st	9	8	1	0	21	5	Squad
(Canada) 1976	5th place game	5th	6	3	1	2	22	13	Squad
(Soviet Union) 1980	Withdrew								
(United States) 1984	Final	2nd	7	4	1	2	14	6	Squad
(South Korea) 1988	Final	2nd	7	5	1	1	16	7	Squad
(Spain) 1992	Final	1st	7	6	1	0	20	6	Squad
(United States) 1996	3rd place game	4th	7	3	1	3	13	9	Squad
(Australia) 2000	5th place game	5th	7	4	2	1	17	8	Squad
(Greece) 2004	3rd place game	3rd	7	4	2	1	21	12	Squad
(China) 2008	Final	1st	7	4	3	0	14	7	Squad
(United Kingdom) 2012	Final	1st	7	5	1	1	20	14	Squad
(Brazil) 2016	3rd place game	3rd	8	5	2	1	23	18	Squad
(Japan) 2020	3rd place game	4th	8	4	0	4	27	19	Squad
(France) 2024	Final	2nd	8	6	1	1	23	11	Squad
Total	4 titles	20/25	138	85	25	28	349	178	

=== World Cup ===
- 1971–1990 as West Germany
- 1994–present as Germany

World Cup record
Year	Round	Position	Pld	W	D *	L	GF	GA	Squad
(Spain) 1971	5th place game	5th	7	4	0	3	12	7	Squad
(Netherlands) 1973	3rd place game	3rd	7	5	2	0	7	2	Squad
(Malaysia) 1975	3rd place game	3rd	7	4	1	2	18	14	Squad
(Argentina) 1978	3rd place game	4th	8	3	2	3	28	18	Squad
(India) 1982	Final	2nd	7	3	2	2	17	16	Squad
(England) 1986	3rd place game	3rd	7	3	3	1	14	9	Squad
(Pakistan) 1990	3rd place game	4th	7	5	0	2	16	7	Squad
(Australia) 1994	3rd place game	4th	7	2	4	1	13	9	Squad
(Netherlands) 1998	3rd place game	3rd	7	5	1	1	19	10	Squad
(Malaysia) 2002	Final	1st	9	8	0	1	24	11	Squad
(Germany) 2006	Final	1st	7	4	3	0	18	10	Squad
(India) 2010	Final	2nd	7	4	2	1	24	12	Squad
(Netherlands) 2014	5th place game	6th	6	3	0	3	17	10	Squad
(India) 2018	Quarter-finals	5th	4	3	0	1	11	6	Squad
(India) 2023	Final	1st	7	4	3	0	26	13	Squad
(Belgium) (Netherlands) 2026	Final	1st	7	5	1	1	15	5	Squad
Total	4 titles	16/16	111	65	24	22	279	159	

=== European Championships ===
- 1970–1987 as West Germany
- 1991–present as Germany

EuroHockey Championship record
Year	Round	Position	Pld	W	D *	L	GF	GA
(Belgium) 1970	Final	1st	6	5	1	0	14	2
(Spain) 1974	Final	2nd	7	6	0	1	30	3
(West Germany) 1978	Final	1st	7	6	1	0	27	6
(Netherlands) 1983	3rd place game	3rd	7	5	0	2	27	13
(Soviet Union) 1987	3rd place game	3rd	7	6	0	1	20	7
(France) 1991	Final	2nd	7	7	0	0	25	3
(Republic of Ireland) 1995	Final	1st	7	5	1	1	29	5
(Italy) 1999	Final	1st	7	5	2	0	30	8
(Spain) 2003	Final	1st	7	6	1	0	27	7
(Germany) 2005	3rd place game	3rd	5	4	0	1	21	6
(England) 2007	3rd place game	4th	5	2	2	1	16	9
(Netherlands) 2009	Final	2nd	5	3	1	1	15	13
(Germany) 2011	Final	1st	5	5	0	0	20	4
(Belgium) 2013	Final	1st	5	4	0	1	18	9
(England) 2015	Final	2nd	5	3	1	1	16	10
(Netherlands) 2017	3rd place game	4th	5	3	1	1	16	13
(Belgium) 2019	3rd place game	4th	5	3	0	2	18	11
(Netherlands) 2021	Final	2nd	5	3	2	0	21	12
(Germany) 2023	3rd place game	4th	5	2	2	1	10	6
(Germany) 2025	Final	1st	5	3	2	0	19	5
(England) 2027	Qualified							
Total	9 titles	21/21	117	86	17	14	419	152

=== FIH Pro League ===
FIH Pro League record
Season	Position	Pld	W	D *	L	GF	GA	Squad
2019	6th	14	4	5	5	30	38	Squad
2020–21	3rd	10	5	2	3	26	23	Squad
2021–22	4th	16	8	2	6	40	36	Squad
2022–23	6th	16	6	2	8	31	35	Squad
2023–24	6th	16	5	6	5	33	29	Squad
2024–25	4th	16	8	3	5	46	34	Squad
2025–26	6th	16	5	3	8	39	46	Squad
Total	Best: 3rd	104	41	23	40	245	241	

=== Sultan Azlan Shah Cup ===
- 1987 as West Germany
- 1995–present as Germany

Sultan Azlan Shah Cup record
Year	Position
1987	1st
1995	2nd
1998	2nd
1999	3rd
2000	5th
2001	1st
2003	2nd
2004	4th
Best result: 1st place

=== Defunct competitions ===
==== Champions Trophy ====
- 1978–1989 as West Germany
- 1990–present as Germany

Champions Trophy record
Year	Position	Pld	W	D*	L	GF	GA
(Pakistan) 1978	did not participate						
(Pakistan) 1980	2nd	6	4	1	1	25	20
(Pakistan) 1982	3rd	5	1	3	1	14	11
(Netherlands) 1982	5th	5	1	2	2	10	14
(Pakistan) 1983	3rd	5	3	0	2	9	9
(Pakistan) 1984	did not participate						
(Australia) 1985	3rd	5	1	3	1	13	12
(Pakistan) 1986	1st	5	3	2	0	10	5
(Netherlands) 1987	1st	7	5	2	0	18	7
(Pakistan) 1988	1st	5	4	0	1	11	5
(West Germany) 1989	3rd	5	2	1	2	10	8
(Australia) 1990	3rd	5	3	1	1	14	12
(Germany) 1991	1st	5	3	2	0	12	6
(Pakistan) 1992	1st	6	5	0	1	17	8
(Malaysia) 1993	2nd	6	5	0	1	15	10
(Pakistan) 1994	2nd	6	3	3	0	10	7
(Germany) 1995	1st	6	3	3	0	8	2
(India) 1996	3rd	6	4	0	2	17	11
(Australia) 1997	1st	6	4	1	1	15	10
(Pakistan) 1998	6th	6	0	1	5	9	20
(Australia) 1999	did not participate						
(Netherlands) 2000	2nd	6	3	0	3	15	10
(Netherlands) 2001	1st	6	6	0	0	17	8
(Germany) 2002	2nd	6	4	1	1	13	12
(Netherlands) 2003	6th	6	0	0	6	7	25
(Pakistan) 2004	5th	6	2	1	3	11	16
(India) 2005	4th	6	1	2	3	12	18
(Spain) 2006	2nd	6	2	3	1	15	13
(Malaysia) 2007	1st	8	6	1	1	22	14
(Netherlands) 2008	5th	6	1	1	4	13	17
(Australia) 2009	2nd	6	3	0	3	20	21
(Germany) 2010	4th	6	2	0	4	13	15
(New Zealand) 2011	5th	6	4	1	1	15	8
(Australia) 2012	6th	6	3	0	3	18	19
(India) 2014	1st	6	4	0	2	9	9
(United Kingdom) 2016	3rd	6	2	3	1	19	12
(Netherlands) 2018	did not participate						
Total	10 titles	192	97	38	57	456	394

==== Hockey World League ====
Hockey World League record
Season	Position	Round	Pld	W	D *	L	GF	GA
2012–13	7th	Semifinal	6	5	1	0	22	5
2012–13	7th	Final	6	2	1	3	17	14
2014–15	7th	Semifinal	7	6	0	1	29	7
2014–15	7th	Final	5	1	2	2	11	11
2016–17	4th	Semifinal	7	5	1	1	20	13
2016–17	4th	Final	6	2	2	2	10	10
Total	Best: 4th	Final	37	21	7	9	109	60

*Draws include matches decided on a penalty shoot-out.

== Team ==
=== Current squad ===
Roster for the 2026 Men's FIH Hockey World Cup.

Head coach: André Henning

5. Linus Müller
7. Justus Warweg
8. Benedikt Schwarzhaupt
10. Johannes Große
11. Thies Prinz
13. Paul-Philipp Kaufmann
14. Teo Hinrichs
15. Tom Grambusch (C)
17. Christopher Rühr
19. Justus Weigand
21. Michel Struthoff
22. Hugo von Montgelas
24. Erik Kleinlein
25. Hannes Müller
29. Malte Hellwig
34. Jakob Brilla
38. Antheus Barry
39. Joshua Onyekwue-Nnaji (GK)
44. Moritz Ludwig
74. Jean Danneberg (GK)

=== Coaches ===
Years	Coach
1969–1973	(Germany) Horst Wein
1974–1990	(Germany) Klaus Kleiter
1990–2000	(Germany) Paul Lissek
2000–2006	(Germany) Bernhard Peters
2006–2015	(Germany) Markus Weise
2015–2016	(Germany) Valentin Altenburg
2016–2019	(Germany) Stefan Kermas
2019	(Germany) Markus Weise (caretaker)
2019–2021	(Germany) Kais al Saadi
2021–present	(Germany) André Henning

== Results and fixtures ==
The following is a list of match results in the last 12 months, as well as any future matches that have been scheduled.

Win Draw Loss Fixture

=== 2026 ===
11 February 2026 2025–26 Men's FIH Pro League	Pakistan	2–5	Germany	Hobart, Australia
11:30	Ammad 18'; Khan 57'	Report	Rühr 6'; Grambusch 17'; Schwarzhaupt 25'; Hellwig 41'; Hartkopf 42'	Stadium: Tasmanian Hockey Centre

12 February 2026 2025–26 Men's FIH Pro League	Australia	3–0	Germany	Hobart, Australia
17:30	Rintala 10'; Geddes 18'; Marais 37'	Report		Stadium: Tasmanian Hockey Centre

14 February 2026 2025–26 Men's FIH Pro League	Germany	6–1	Pakistan	Hobart, Australia
09:30	Sperling 26'; Warweg 28', 36'; Ludwig 30'; Mertgens 32'; Hartkopf 54'	Report	Rana 18'	Stadium: Tasmanian Hockey Centre

15 February 2026 2025–26 Men's FIH Pro League	Australia	3–2	Germany	Hobart, Australia
15:30	Welch 8'; Govers 18'; Brand 47'	Report	Brilla 10', 16'	Stadium: Tasmanian Hockey Centre

13 June 2026 2025–26 Men's FIH Pro League	Netherlands	2–2 (0–1 p)	Germany	Rotterdam, Netherlands
16:00	Janssen 54'; Telgenkamp 54'	Report	Hellwig 25'; Schwarzhaupt 48'	Stadium: Hazelaarweg Stadion
	Penalties
	Bukkens (penalty shoot-out missed); Brinkman (penalty shoot-out missed); Middendorp (penalty shoot-out missed); Veen (penalty shoot-out missed); Janssen (penalty shoot-out missed)		(penalty shoot-out missed) Weigand; (penalty shoot-out missed) Struthoff; (penalty shoot-out scored) Rühr; (penalty shoot-out missed) Warweg

17 June 2026 2025–26 Men's FIH Pro League	India	3–1	Germany	Rotterdam, Netherlands
19:30	Mandeep 7'; Lakra 13'; Nilakanta 35'	Report	Hartkopf 45'	Stadium: Hazelaarweg Stadion

18 June 2026 2025–26 Men's FIH Pro League	Germany	2–1	India	Rotterdam, Netherlands
19:30	Weigand 56'; Brilla 60'	Report	Jugraj 38'	Stadium: Hazelaarweg Stadion

20 June 2026 2025–26 Men's FIH Pro League	Netherlands	5–3	Germany	Rotterdam, Netherlands
15:30	de Vilder 2'; Janssen 13', 14'; Brinkman 31'; Telgenkamp 56'	Report	Warweg 24'; Hellwig 35'; Hinrichs 59'	Stadium: Hazelaarweg Stadion

24 June 2026 2025–26 Men's FIH Pro League	Germany	2–1	Argentina	Berlin, Germany
20:30	Weigand 26', 59'	Report	Ferreiro 45'	Stadium: Ernst-Reuter Sportfeld

25 June 2026 2025–26 Men's FIH Pro League	Germany	3–3 (3–1 p)	Spain	Berlin, Germany
20:30	Müller 36'; Grambusch 50'; Schwarzhaupt 54'	Report	Font 14'; Fortuño 46'; Cunill 60'	Stadium: Ernst-Reuter Sportfeld
	Penalties
	Prinz (penalty shoot-out missed); Rühr (penalty shoot-out scored); Struthoff (penalty shoot-out scored); Hartkopf (penalty shoot-out scored)		(penalty shoot-out scored) Gispert; (penalty shoot-out missed) Bonastre; (penalty shoot-out missed) Miralles; (penalty shoot-out missed) Font

27 June 2026 2025–26 Men's FIH Pro League	Germany	4–4 (2–1 p)	Argentina	Berlin, Germany
13:30	Schwarzhaupt 11'; Brilla 13'; Weigand 55', 60'	Report	Della Torre 15'; T. Domene 28', 34'; Ferreiro 41'	Stadium: Ernst-Reuter Sportfeld
	Penalties
	Struthoff (penalty shoot-out missed); Weigand (penalty shoot-out scored); Hayner (penalty shoot-out scored); Prinz (penalty shoot-out missed)		(penalty shoot-out scored) T. Domene; (penalty shoot-out missed) Ibarra; (penalty shoot-out missed) L. Toscani; (penalty shoot-out missed) Ferreiro; (penalty shoot-out missed) J. Toscani

28 June 2026 2025–26 Men's FIH Pro League	Germany	2–5	Spain	Berlin, Germany
12:30	Hellwig 8'; Brilla 58'	Report	Zaldua 29'; Cunill 30', 57'; Basterra 34', 42'	Stadium: Ernst-Reuter Sportfeld

31 July 2026 Friendly match 1	Netherlands	1–0	Germany

2 August 2026 Friendly match 2	Netherlands	1–1	Germany

15 August 2026 World Cup Pool B	Germany	5–1	Malaysia	Wavre, Belgium
14:30	Brilla 3'; Rühr 4'; Weigand 7'; Warweg 44'; Kaufmann 52'	Report	Azrai 39'	Stadium: Belfius Hockey Arena

17 August 2026 World Cup Pool B	Germany	1–0	Belgium	Wavre, Belgium
20:30	Brilla 39'	Report		Stadium: Belfius Hockey Arena

19 August 2026 World Cup Pool B	France	1–1	Germany	Wavre, Belgium
17:00	Haertelmeyer 60'	Report	Weigand 43'	Stadium: Belfius Hockey Arena

21 August 2026 World Cup Pool F	Germany	1–2	Spain	Wavre, Belgium
17:00	Weigand 26'	Report	Basterra 30', 50'	Stadium: Belfius Hockey Arena

23 August 2026 World Cup Pool F	Germany	4–2	Australia	Wavre, Belgium
17:30	Müller 11'; Struthoff 12'; Warweg 19'; Von Montgelas 40'	Report	Govers 3'; Rintala 30'	Stadium: Belfius Hockey Arena

28 August 2026 World Cup Semi final	Germany	2–1	Argentina	Wavre, Belgium
20:30	Weigand 33'; Kaufmann 54'	Report	Domene 46'	Stadium: Belfius Hockey Arena

30 August 2026 World Cup Final	Spain	0–1	Germany	Wavre, Belgium
16:30		Report	Struthoff 44'	Stadium: Belfius Hockey Arena

== See also ==
- East Germany men's national field hockey team
- Germany men's national under-21 field hockey team
- Germany women's national field hockey team
