= Spain men's national field hockey team =

Men's national field hockey team representing Spain

Spain
- Nickname(s): Redsticks
- Association: Royal Spanish Hockey Federation (Real Federación Española de Hockey)
- Confederation: EHF (Europe)
- Head Coach: Maximiliano Caldas
- Assistant coach(es): Bernardino Herrera; Borja Movellan; Oriol Torras
- Manager: César Hernández
- Captain: Marc Miralles
- Most caps: Quico Cortés (323)
- Top scorer: Santi Freixa (126)
Home	Away

FIH ranking
- Current: 6 (4 October 2026)
- Highest: 3 (2006, 2008–2009)
- Lowest: 11 (March 2015 – June 2016)

Olympic Games
- Appearances: 19 (first in 1928)
- Best result: (silver) 2nd (1980, 1996, 2008)

World Cup
- Appearances: 16 (first in 1971)
- Best result: (silver) 2nd (1971, 1998, 2026)

EuroHockey Championship
- Appearances: 20 (first in 1970)
- Best result: (gold) 1st (1974, 2005)
Medal record
Men's field hockey
Event	1st	2nd	3rd
Olympic Games	0	3	1
World Cup	0	3	1
EuroHockey Championships	2	3	2
Champions Trophy	1	2	3
Total	3	11	7
Olympic Games
Silver medal – second place	1980 Moscow	Team
Silver medal – second place	1996 Atlanta	Team
Silver medal – second place	2008 Beijing	Team
Bronze medal – third place	1960 Rome	Team
World Cup
Silver medal – second place	1971 Barcelona	
Silver medal – second place	1998 Utrecht	
Silver medal – second place	2026 Wavre-Amstelveen	
Bronze medal – third place	2006 Mönchengladbach	
EuroHockey Championships
Gold medal – first place	1974 Madrid	
Gold medal – first place	2005 Leipzig	
Silver medal – second place	2003 Barcelona	
Silver medal – second place	2007 Manchester	
Silver medal – second place	2019 Antwerp	
Bronze medal – third place	1970 Brussels	
Bronze medal – third place	2025 Mönchengladbach	
Champions Trophy
Gold medal – first place	2004 Lahore	
Silver medal – second place	2008 Rotterdam	
Silver medal – second place	2011 Auckland	
Bronze medal – third place	1997 Adelaide	
Bronze medal – third place	2005 Chennai	
Bronze medal – third place	2006 Terrassa	
Champions Challenge
Gold medal – first place	2003 Johannesburg	

The Spain men's national field hockey team represents Spain in international men's field hockey competitions. It is controlled by the Royal Spanish Hockey Association, the governing body for field hockey in Spain.

Spain has competed in every European Championship or World Cup, and has qualified consistently since 1960 for the Olympic Games. They also have won medals in these three main international competitions: six at European Championships (two-time winners), four at World Cups (three-time finalists) and four at Olympic Games (three silvers and a bronze).

== Tournament record ==
=== Olympic Games ===
Olympic record
Year	Round	Position	Pld	W	D*	L	GF	GA	Squad
(United Kingdom) 1908	did not participate								
(Belgium) 1920	did not participate								
(Netherlands) 1928	Group stage	7th	3	0	1	2	3	8	Squad
(United States) 1932	did not participate								
(Nazi Germany) 1936	did not participate								
(United Kingdom) 1948	Group stage	11th	3	0	1	2	3	6	Squad
(Finland) 1952	did not participate								
(Australia) 1956	did not participate								
(Italy) 1960	3rd place game	3rd	6	4	1	1	11	4	Squad
(Japan) 1964	3rd place game	4th	9	4	3	2	18	9	Squad
(Mexico) 1968	5th place game	6th	9	3	3	3	10	8	Squad
(West Germany) 1972	7th place game	7th	9	3	4	2	11	11	Squad
(Canada) 1976	5th place game	6th	7	2	2	3	12	18	Squad
(Soviet Union) 1980	Final	2nd	6	4	1	1	36	7	Squad
(United States) 1984	7th place game	8th	7	2	1	4	11	13	Squad
(South Korea) 1988	9th place game	9th	7	3	1	3	10	10	Squad
(Spain) 1992	5th place game	5th	7	5	0	2	19	12	Squad
(United States) 1996	Final	2nd	7	5	0	2	17	9	Squad
(Australia) 2000	9th place game	9th	7	2	2	3	11	15	Squad
(Greece) 2004	3rd place game	4th	7	3	2	2	20	13	Squad
(China) 2008	Final	2nd	7	5	0	2	12	8	Squad
(United Kingdom) 2012	5th place game	6th	6	2	2	2	10	15	Squad
(Brazil) 2016	Quarter-finals	5th	6	3	1	2	14	8	Squad
(Japan) 2020	Quarter-finals	8th	6	1	2	3	10	13	Squad
(France) 2024	3rd place game	4th	8	3	1	4	15	20	Squad
Total	Best: 2nd place	19/25	127	42	28	57	253	207	–

=== World Cup ===
World Cup record
Year	Round	Position	Pld	W	D*	L	GF	GA	Squad
(Spain) 1971	Final	2nd	6	3	1	2	6	4	N/A
(Netherlands) 1973	5th place game	5th	7	5	0	2	17	5	N/A
(Malaysia) 1975	7th place game	8th	7	2	1	4	10	16	N/A
(Argentina) 1978	5th place game	5th	8	5	1	2	11	5	N/A
(India) 1982	11th place game	11th	7	2	1	4	11	14	N/A
(England) 1986	5th place game	5th	7	4	1	2	14	16	N/A
(Pakistan) 1990	7th place game	8th	7	3	0	4	17	13	N/A
(Australia) 1994	9th place game	9th	7	2	2	3	10	9	N/A
(Netherlands) 1998	Final	2nd	7	5	1	1	19	7	Squad
(Malaysia) 2002	11th place game	11th	9	4	2	3	17	15	Squad
(Germany) 2006	3rd place game	3rd	7	4	3	0	18	11	Squad
(India) 2010	5th place game	5th	6	4	0	2	14	8	Squad
(Netherlands) 2014	7th place game	8th	6	1	3	2	10	13	Squad
(India) 2018	Group stage	13th	3	0	2	1	6	7	Squad
(India) 2023	Quarter-finals	6th	5	1	1	3	10	13	Squad
(Belgium) / (Netherlands) 2026	Final	2nd	7	4	1	2	13	9	Squad
Total	Best: 2nd place	16/16	106	49	20	37	203	165	–

=== EuroHockey Championship ===
EuroHockey Championship record
Year	Round	Position	Pld	W	D*	L	GF	GA
(Belgium) 1970	3rd place game	3rd	7	4	2	1	25	6
(Spain) 1974	Final	1st	6	5	1	0	12	1
(West Germany) 1978	3rd place game	4th	7	3	1	3	12	13
(Netherlands) 1983	3rd place game	4th	7	5	0	2	27	12
(Soviet Union) 1987	7th place game	7th	7	2	2	3	18	12
(France) 1991	5th place game	5th	7	4	0	3	13	10
(Republic of Ireland) 1995	7th place game	8th	7	3	1	3	13	11
(Italy) 1999	5th place game	5th	7	5	1	1	22	7
(Spain) 2003	Final	2nd	7	5	1	1	28	14
(Germany) 2005	Final	1st	5	4	0	1	16	10
(England) 2007	Final	2nd	5	1	2	2	14	11
(Netherlands) 2009	3rd place game	4th	5	3	0	2	14	9
(Germany) 2011	Group stage	6th	5	3	0	2	12	10
(Belgium) 2013	Group stage	5th	5	3	1	1	19	10
(England) 2015	Group stage	6th	5	2	0	3	13	12
(Netherlands) 2017	Group stage	5th	5	3	1	1	8	10
(Belgium) 2019	Final	2nd	5	2	1	2	11	16
(Netherlands) 2021	Group stage	5th	5	2	0	3	17	12
(Germany) 2023	Group stage	6th	5	2	0	3	14	14
(Germany) 2025	3rd place game	3rd	5	3	0	2	15	8
(England) 2027	Qualified							
Total	2 titles	21/21	117	64	14	39	323	208

=== Hockey World League ===
World League record
Season	Position	Round	Pld	W	D*	L	GF	GA
2012–13	10th	Semi-final	6	2	2	2	10	11
2014–15	10th	Semi-final	7	2	1	4	13	15
2016–17	6th	Semi-final	7	4	1	2	12	16
2016–17	6th	Final	5	2	0	3	6	13
Total	Best: 6th	Final	25	10	4	11	41	55

=== FIH Pro League ===
FIH Pro League record
Season	Position	Pld	W	D*	L	GF	GA	Squad
2019	7th	14	2	5	7	33	45	Squad
2020–21	9th	12	2	4	8	23	36	Squad
2021–22	7th	16	5	3	8	36	43	Squad
2022–23	5th	16	8	3	5	37	40	Squad
2023–24	7th	16	4	1	11	36	43	Squad
2024–25	3rd	16	8	3	5	39	28	Squad
2025–26	7th	16	5	3	8	39	41	Squad
Total	Best: 3rd	96	34	22	52	240	276	

=== Champions Trophy ===
Champions Trophy record
Year	Position	Pld	W	D*	L	GF	GA
(Pakistan) 1978	5th	4	0	1	3	7	15
(Pakistan) 1980	6th	6	1	2	3	8	16
(Pakistan) 1981	5th	5	1	1	3	9	19
(Netherlands) 1982	did not participate						
(Pakistan) 1982	did not participate						
(Pakistan) 1984	6th	5	0	1	4	7	15
(Australia) 1985	did not participate						
(Pakistan) 1986	did not participate						
(Netherlands) 1987	6th	7	1	1	5	6	14
(Pakistan) 1988	5th	5	1	1	3	4	10
(West Germany) 1989 until (Pakistan) 1992	did not participate						
(Malaysia) 1993	5th	6	1	0	5	7	16
(Pakistan) 1994	5th	6	1	2	3	13	18
(Germany) 1995	did not participate						
(India) 1996	5th	6	1	2	3	11	16
(Australia) 1997	3rd	6	3	1	2	16	12
(Pakistan) 1998	5th	6	2	1	3	16	17
(Australia) 1999	4th	6	2	1	3	10	12
(Netherlands) 2000	4th	6	2	1	3	8	8
(Netherlands) 2001	did not participate						
(Germany) 2002	did not participate						
(Netherlands) 2003	did not participate						
(Pakistan) 2004	1st	6	5	0	1	21	9
(India) 2005	3rd	6	4	0	2	18	14
(Spain) 2006	3rd	6	2	3	1	15	13
(Malaysia) 2007	5th	8	4	2	2	25	17
(Netherlands) 2008	2nd	6	3	1	2	15	11
(Australia) 2009	5th	6	1	2	3	22	28
(Germany) 2010	5th	6	2	2	2	16	19
(New Zealand) 2011	2nd	6	4	0	2	20	10
(Australia) 2012	Withdrew						
(India) 2014	did not participate						
(United Kingdom) 2016	did not participate						
(Netherlands) 2018	did not participate						
Total	1 title	124	41	25	58	274	309

=== Champions Challenge ===
Champions Challenge record
Year	Position	Pld	W	D*	L	GF	GA
(Malaysia) 2001	did not participate						
(South Africa) 2003	1st	6	5	0	1	22	12
(Belgium) 2007 until (Malaysia) 2014	did not participate						
Total	1 title	6	5	0	1	22	12

*Draws include matches decided on a penalty shoot-out.

== Players ==
=== Current squad ===
Roster for the 2026 Men's FIH Hockey World Cup.

Head coach: Max Caldas

2. Alejandro Alonso
5. Jordi Bonastre
6. Xavier Gispert
7. Rafael Vilallonga
8. Marc Recasens
9. Borja Lacalle
10. José Basterra
11. Gerard Clapés
12. Marc Reyné
14. Marc Miralles (C)
15. Luis Calzado (GK)
16. Rafael Revilla (GK)
17. Pepe Cunill
18. Joaquín Menini
22. Pol Cabré-Verdiell
23. Marc Vizcaíno
26. Bruno Font
28. Nicolás Álvarez
35. Iñaky Zaldúa
62. Ignacio Cobos

== Results and fixtures ==
The following is a list of match results in the last 12 months, as well as any future matches that have been scheduled.

Win Draw Loss Fixture

=== 2026 ===
5 February 2026 2025–26 Men's FIH Pro League	Spain	3–4	Netherlands	Valencia, Spain
11:00	Vizcaino 10'; Pe. Cunill 15'; N. Álvarez 60'	Report	Van der Heijden 27'; Van Dam 42'; Brinkman 48'; Reyenga 59'	Stadium: Estadio Beteró

7 February 2026 2025–26 Men's FIH Pro League	Spain	1–3	England	Valencia, Spain
11:00	M. Miralles 18'	Report	Waller 3'; Bandurak 24'; Ward 53'	Stadium: Estadio Beteró

8 February 2026 2025–26 Men's FIH Pro League	Spain	2–3	Netherlands	Valencia, Spain
11:00	Basterra 36'; Abajo 39'	Report	Heijden 24'; Telgenkamp 25', 58'	Stadium: Estadio Beteró

10 February 2026 2025–26 Men's FIH Pro League	Spain	2–4	England	Valencia, Spain
09:00	Basterra 28', 38'	Report	Payton 4'; Ward 26', 59'; Rushmere 42'	Stadium: Estadio Beteró

20 February 2026 2025–26 Men's FIH Pro League	Australia	3–1	Spain	Hobert, Australia
19:30	Welch 3', 58'; Rintala 16'	Report	Álvarez 53'	Stadium: Tasmanian Hockey Centre

21 February 2026 2025–26 Men's FIH Pro League	India	0–2	Spain	Hobart, Australia
11:30		Report	Abajo 6'; Cobos 36'	Stadium: Tasmanian Hockey Centre

23 February 2026 2025–26 Men's FIH Pro League	Australia	3–0	Spain	Hobart, Australia
19:30	Rintala 1'; Hayward 36'; Craig 44'	Report		Stadium: Tasmanian Hockey Centre

24 February 2026 2025–26 Men's FIH Pro League	Spain	1–1 (4–3 p)	India	Hobart, Australia
10:30	Font 59'	Report	Maninder 19'	Stadium: Tasmanian Hockey Centre
	Penalties
	Bonastre (penalty shoot-out scored); Recasens (penalty shoot-out scored); Cabre Verdiell (penalty shoot-out scored); Font (penalty shoot-out scored)		(penalty shoot-out scored) Lakra; (penalty shoot-out scored) Maninder; (penalty shoot-out missed) Abhishek; (penalty shoot-out scored) Pal; (penalty shoot-out missed) Hardik

14 June 2026 2025–26 Men's FIH Pro League	Pakistan	1–5	Spain	Wavre, Belgium
18:30	Mahmood 43'	Report	Álvarez 11', 52'; Cunill 23', 30'; Reyne 48'	Stadium: Stade Justin Peeters

16 June 2026 2025–26 Men's FIH Pro League	Belgium	3–1	Spain	Wavre, Belgium
21:00	Boon 32'; Hendrickx 44'; Stockbroekx 47'	Report	Vizcaino 33'	Stadium: Stade Justin Peeters

20 June 2026 2025–26 Men's FIH Pro League	Spain	4–2	Pakistan	Wavre, Belgium
18:30	Cunill 29'; Alonso 35'; Álvarez 43', 51'	Report	Mahmood 28', 44'	Stadium: Stade Justin Peeters

21 June 2026 2025–26 Men's FIH Pro League	Belgium	3–2	Spain	Wavre, Belgium
14:00	Stockbroekx 35'; Hendrickx 42'; Boon 56'	Report	Basterra 43'; Fortuño 54'	Stadium: Stade Justin Peeters

23 June 2026 2025–26 Men's FIH Pro League	Argentina	2–3	Spain	Berlin, Germany
17:30	T. Domene 7'; Della Torre 46'	Report	Basterra 22'; Recasens 27'; Cunill 33'	Stadium: Ernst-Reuter Sportfeld

25 June 2026 2025–26 Men's FIH Pro League	Germany	3–3 (3–1 p)	Spain	Berlin, Germany
20:30	Müller 36'; Grambusch 50'; Schwarzhaupt 54'	Report	Font 14'; Fortuño 46'; Cunill 60'	Stadium: Ernst-Reuter Sportfeld
	Penalties
	Prinz (penalty shoot-out missed); Rühr (penalty shoot-out scored); Struthoff (penalty shoot-out scored); Hartkopf (penalty shoot-out scored)		(penalty shoot-out scored) Gispert; (penalty shoot-out missed) Bonastre; (penalty shoot-out missed) Miralles; (penalty shoot-out missed) Font

26 June 2026 2025–26 Men's FIH Pro League	Spain	4–4 (1–3 p)	Argentina	Berlin, Germany
17:30	Basterra 24', 25'; Álvarez 34', 57'	Report	T. Domene 1', 39'; Della Torre 43'; Tarazona 58'	Stadium: Ernst-Reuter Sportfeld
	Penalties
	Gispert (penalty shoot-out missed); Bonastre (penalty shoot-out scored); Miralles (penalty shoot-out missed); Font (penalty shoot-out missed)		(penalty shoot-out scored) Méndez; (penalty shoot-out missed) Ferreiro; (penalty shoot-out scored) T. Domene; (penalty shoot-out missed) T. Domene; (penalty shoot-out scored) Toscani

28 June 2026 2025–26 Men's FIH Pro League	Germany	2–5	Spain	Berlin, Germany
12:30	Hellwig 8'; Brilla 58'	Report	Zaldua 29'; Cunill 30', 57'; Basterra 34', 42'	Stadium: Ernst-Reuter Sportfeld

16 July 2026 Friendly match 1	Spain	8–0	Wales	Terrassa, Spain
11:00				Stadium: Estadi Martí Colomer

17 July 2026 Friendly match 2	Spain	9–2	Wales	Terrassa, Spain
11:00				Stadium: Estadi Martí Colomer

16 August 2026 World Cup Pool C	Spain	3–1	South Africa	Wavre, Belgium
14:30	Reyne 12'; Basterra 13', 28'	Report	Cassiem 45'	Stadium: Belfius Hockey Arena

18 August 2026 World Cup Pool C	Spain	0–1	Australia	Wavre, Belgium
14:00		Report	Govers 47'	Stadium: Belfius Hockey Arena

20 August 2026 World Cup Pool C	Ireland	1–3	Spain	Wavre, Belgium
17:00	Cole 19'	Report	Álvarez 9'; Reyné 47', 53'	Stadium: Belfius Hockey Arena

21 August 2026 World Cup Pool F	Germany	1–2	Spain	Wavre, Belgium
17:00	Weigand 26'	Report	Basterra 30', 50'	Stadium: Belfius Hockey Arena

23 August 2026 World Cup Pool F	Spain	1–1	Belgium	Wavre, Belgium
20:30	Miralles 46'	Report	Van Doren 4'	Stadium: Belfius Hockey Arena

28 August 2026 World Cup Semi final	Netherlands	3–4	Spain	Amstelveen, Netherlands
18:00	Bijen 22'; Janssen 57' de Mol 59'	Report	Basterra 41', 50', 55'; Cunill 51'	Stadium: Wagener Stadium

30 August 2026 World Cup Final	Spain	0–1	Germany	Wavre, Belgium
16:30		Report	Struthoff 44'	Stadium: Belfius Hockey Arena

== See also ==
- Spain women's national field hockey team
- Spain men's national under-21 field hockey team
