= 2024–25 Men's FIH Pro League =

Men's field hockey competition

- Dates: 30 November 2024 – 29 June 2025
- Teams: 9 (from 4 confederations)

Final positions
- Champions: Netherlands (3rd title)
- Runner-up: Belgium
- Third place: Spain

Tournament statistics
- Matches played: 72
- Goals scored: 343 (4.76 per match)
- Top scorer: (Belgium) Tom Boon (21 goals)

The 2024–25 Men's FIH Pro League was the sixth edition of the Men's FIH Pro League, a field hockey championship for men's national teams. The tournament began on 30 November 2024 and finished on 29 June 2025.

== Format ==
The home and away principle was kept for the season, which was divided into date blocks. To assist with competition planning, international and national, several teams gathered in one venue to contest “mini-tournaments," wherein they each played two matches against one another.

If one of the two matches played between two teams was cancelled, the winner of the other match received double points.

The winning team earned direct qualification to the 2026 World Cup.

== Teams ==
Following their win of the 2023–24 FIH Nations Cup, the promoted team were set with New Zealand replacing the relegated team of the last season of the 2023–24 FIH Pro League, Ireland. On 1 October 2024, New Zealand withdrew and Ireland was named to replace them. Great Britain was replaced by England for this edition.

- Argentina
- Australia
- Belgium
- England
- Germany
- India
- Ireland
- Netherlands
- ~~New Zealand~~
- Spain

== Venues and stages ==
Following is a list of all venues and host cities across the world. Tournament hosts in parentheses.

December	February	June
Belgium; Germany; Netherlands (host)	Australia (host); Netherlands; Spain	Argentina; Spain (host)
Argentina (host); England; Ireland	England; Germany; India (host); Ireland; Spain	Argentina; India; Ireland; Netherlands (host)
	Argentina (host); Australia; Belgium	Australia; England (host); Germany; Netherlands
		Australia; Belgium (host); England; India; Ireland; Spain
Argentina; Australia; Germany (host); Spain

== Results ==
=== Standings ===
Pos	Team	Pld	W	SOW	SOL	L	GF	GA	GD	Pts	Qualification or relegation
1st place, gold medalist(s)	Netherlands (Note: Belgium and the Netherlands are already qualified for the 2026 FIH World Cup as hosts.) (C)	16	7	7	0	2	38	29	+9	35	
2nd place, silver medalist(s)	Belgium	16	8	2	2	4	53	39	+14	30	
3rd place, bronze medalist(s)	Spain (Q)	16	8	2	1	5	39	28	+11	29	Qualified for the 2026 FIH World Cup
4	Germany	16	8	1	2	5	46	34	+12	28	
5	Australia (Note: Australia is already qualified for the 2026 FIH World Cup as the highest placed nation of the 2023–24 FIH Pro League.)	16	8	0	3	5	42	32	+10	27	
6	Argentina	16	7	0	2	7	28	32	−4	23	
7	England	16	5	2	3	6	41	36	+5	22	
8	India	16	6	0	0	10	34	38	−4	18	
9	Ireland (Note: Ireland replaced New Zealand.) (R)	16	1	0	1	14	22	75	−53	4	Relegated to 2025–26 FIH Nations Cup

Source: FIH
Rules for classification: 1) points; 2) matches won; 3) goal difference; 4) goals for; 5) head-to-head result; 6) field goals scored.
(C) Champion; (Q) Qualified to the phase indicated; (R) Relegated

=== Fixtures ===
All times are local.

30 November 2024
14:30

Netherlands	1–1	Germany
Brinkman 30'	Report	Hartkopf 58'
Penalties
De Mol (penalty shoot-out scored); Bijen (penalty shoot-out scored); Bukkens (penalty shoot-out scored); Brinkman (penalty shoot-out scored)	4–1	(penalty shoot-out missed) H. Müller; (penalty shoot-out scored) Struthoff; (penalty shoot-out missed) Große

Wagener Stadium, Amsterdam
Umpires:
Rebecca Edwards (ENG)
Łukasz Zwierzchowski (POL)

1 December 2024
14:30

Netherlands	1–1	Belgium
Van Dam 25'	Report	Stockbroekx 14'
Penalties
Pieters (penalty shoot-out scored); Bijen (penalty shoot-out missed); De Mol (penalty shoot-out scored); Veen (penalty shoot-out scored)	3–1	(penalty shoot-out missed) Duvekot; (penalty shoot-out scored) Van Dessel; (penalty shoot-out missed) Boccard; (penalty shoot-out missed) Kina

Wagener Stadium, Amsterdam
Umpires:
Sean Edwards (ENG)
Gemma Calderon (ESP)

2 December 2024
14:30

Belgium	4–3	Germany
Boon 11', 16', 54'; Duvekot 40'	Report	Zwicker 48'; Sperling 57'; Peillat 60'

Wagener Stadium, Amsterdam
Umpires:
Rebecca Edwards (ENG)
Łukasz Zwierzchowski (POL)

7 December 2024
14:30

Netherlands	2–3	Germany
Janssen 37'; Brinkman 59'	Report	Schwarzhaupt 10'; Peillat 17'; Prinz 43'

Wagener Stadium, Amsterdam
Umpires:
Dan Barstow (ENG)
Ivona Makar (CRO)

8 December 2024
14:30

Netherlands	3–3	Belgium
Bijen 11', 28'; Van der Veen 27'	Report	Boon 1', 45'; Stockbroekx 22'
Penalties
De Mol (penalty shoot-out scored); Bijen (penalty shoot-out scored); Brinkman (penalty shoot-out missed); Veen (penalty shoot-out scored)	3–1	(penalty shoot-out missed) Boccard; (penalty shoot-out scored) Willems; (penalty shoot-out missed) De Sloover; (penalty shoot-out missed) Van Dessel

Wagener Stadium, Amsterdam
Umpires:
Alison Keogh (IRL)
Bruce Bale (ENG)

9 December 2024
14:30

Germany	3–6	Belgium
Hartkopf 18'; Prinz 26'; Mazkour 43'	Report	Ghislain 5'; Boon 15', 42', 51'; Hellin 49'; Stockbroekx 50'

Wagener Stadium, Amsterdam
Umpires:
Alison Keogh (IRL)
Dan Barstow (ENG)

10 December 2024
21:30

Argentina	1–3	England
Merlini 48'	Report	Rushmere 14'; Ward 41', 54'

Polideportivo Provincial, Santiago del Estero
Umpires:
Sean Rapaport (RSA)
Tyler Klenk (CAN)

11 December 2024
21:30

England	3–3	Ireland
Albery 48'; Waller 57'; Wallace 57'	Report	A. Walker 4'; Lynch 16'; Cole 50'
Penalties
Albery (penalty shoot-out scored); Williamson (penalty shoot-out missed); Rushmere (penalty shoot-out scored); Waller (penalty shoot-out missed); Wallace (penalty shoot-out scored)	3–2	(penalty shoot-out scored) Walsh; (penalty shoot-out missed) B. Walker; (penalty shoot-out scored) Lynch; (penalty shoot-out missed) C. Empey; (penalty shoot-out missed) A. Empey

Polideportivo Provincial, Santiago del Estero
Umpires:
Benjamin Peters (USA)
Tyler Klenk (CAN)

12 December 2024
21:30

Argentina	1–0	Ireland
T. Domene 60+'	Report

Polideportivo Provincial, Santiago del Estero
Umpires:
Jonathan Altamirano (MEX)
Sean Rapaport (RSA)

13 December 2024
21:30

Argentina	1–3	England
T. Domene 43'	Report	Ward 2', 2'; Wallace 38'

Polideportivo Provincial, Santiago del Estero
Umpires:
Victoria Pazos (PAR)
Benjamin Peters (USA)

14 December 2024
21:30

Ireland	0–8	England
	Report	Hooper 6', 16'; Rushmere 7'; Ward 15+', 37', 44', 48'; Bhuhi 45'

Polideportivo Provincial, Santiago del Estero
Umpires:
Sean Rapaport (RSA)
Tyler Klenk (CAN)

15 December 2024
21:30

Argentina	4–3	Ireland
T. Domene 5', 9', 38'; Capurro 49'	Report	B. Nelson 3'; A. Empey 15+'; Cole 43'

Polideportivo Provincial, Santiago del Estero
Umpires:
Tyler Klenk (CAN)
Sean Rapaport (RSA)

4 February 2025
17:30

Netherlands	4–2	Spain
Bukkens 27'; Bijen 32'; Veen 34'; Van Heijningen 40'	Report	N. Álvarez 45'; Basterra 59'

Sydney Olympic Park, Sydney
Umpires:
David Tomlinson (NZL)
You Hyo-sik (KOR)

5 February 2025
17:30

Australia	1–2	Spain
Willott 58'	Report	Petchamé 27'; N. Álvarez 50'

Sydney Olympic Park, Sydney
Umpires:
Amber Church (NZL)
David Tomlinson (NZL)

6 February 2025
17:30

Australia	4–2	Netherlands
J. Harvie 27'; Atkin 34'; Burns 43'; Willott 48'	Report	Bijen 44'; Hoedemakers 46'

Sydney Olympic Park, Sydney
Umpires:
David Tomlinson (NZL)
Liu Xiaoying (CHN)

7 February 2025
17:30

Spain	1–2	Netherlands
Clapés 41'	Report	Van der Heijden 2'; Bijen 34'

Sydney Olympic Park, Sydney
Umpires:
Amber Church (NZL)
You Hyo-sik (KOR)

8 February 2025
17:30

Australia	1–1	Spain
Willott 24'	Report	Pa. Cunill 17'
Penalties
Burns (penalty shoot-out missed); Marais (penalty shoot-out missed); Otterbach (penalty shoot-out missed)	0–3	(penalty shoot-out scored) Gispert; (penalty shoot-out scored) Pe. Cunill; (penalty shoot-out scored) Reyné

Sydney Olympic Park, Sydney
Umpires:
David Tomlinson (NZL)
Liu Xiaoying (CHN)

9 February 2025
17:30

Australia	4–4	Netherlands
Hayward 27', 34'; White 28', 36'	Report	De Vilder 7'; Van der Heijden 47', 57'; Bukkens 50'
Penalties
Ephraums (penalty shoot-out missed); Harvie (penalty shoot-out scored); Willott (penalty shoot-out missed); Henderson (penalty shoot-out missed)	1–3	(penalty shoot-out scored) Croon; (penalty shoot-out scored) Bijen; (penalty shoot-out scored) De Mol

Sydney Olympic Park, Sydney
Umpires:
David Tomlinson (NZL)
You Hyo-sik (KOR)

15 February 2025
19:30

India	1–3	Spain
Sukhjeet 25'	Report	Lacalle 28'; Cobos 38'; Ávila 58'

Kalinga Stadium, Bhubaneswar
Umpires:
Timothy Sheahan (AUS)
Annelize Rostron (RSA)

16 February 2025
19:30

India	2–0	Spain
Mandeep 32'; Dilpreet 39'	Report

Kalinga Stadium, Bhubaneswar
Umpires:
Rawi Anbananthan (MAS)
Bevan Nichol (NZL)

18 February 2025
15:00

England	2–2	Spain
Payton 13'; Ward 32'	Report	N. Álvarez 39'; Font 53'
Penalties
Albery (penalty shoot-out missed); Rushmere (penalty shoot-out missed); Williamson (penalty shoot-out missed); Payton (penalty shoot-out scored); Sturch-Hibbitt (penalty shoot-out missed)	1–0	(penalty shoot-out missed) Gispert; (penalty shoot-out missed) Pe. Cunill; (penalty shoot-out missed) Reyné; (penalty shoot-out missed) Font; (penalty shoot-out missed) Basterra

Kalinga Stadium, Bhubaneswar
Umpires:
Ahmed El-Sayed (EGY)
Annelize Rostron (RSA)

18 February 2025
19:30

India	1–4	Germany
Gurjant 13'	Report	Sperling 7'; Prinz 14'; Struthoff 48'; Hartkopf 55'

Kalinga Stadium, Bhubaneswar
Umpires:
Wanri Venter (RSA)
Bevan Nichol (NZL)

19 February 2025
15:00

Spain	4–1	England
Menini 9'; Lacalle 28'; Pe. Cunill 37'; N. Álvarez 49'	Report	Ramshaw 50'

Kalinga Stadium, Bhubaneswar
Umpires:
Timothy Sheahan (AUS)
Wanri Venter (RSA)

19 February 2025
17:15

India	1–0	Germany
Gurjant 4'	Report

Kalinga Stadium, Bhubaneswar
Umpires:
Rawi Anbananthan (MAS)
Annelize Rostron (RSA)

19 February 2025
19:00

Argentina	3–5	Belgium
L. Toscani 10'; Habif 58'; Capurro 60'	Report	Boon 13', 22', 60'; Hellin 31'; Stockbroekx 50'

Polideportivo Provincial, Santiago del Estero
Umpires:
Raphaël Adrien (GER)
Darren Hubach (RSA)

20 February 2025
19:00

Argentina	0–2	Australia
	Report	Brand 12'; Burns 26'

Polideportivo Provincial, Santiago del Estero
Umpires:
Sean Edwards (ENG)
Darren Hubach (RSA)

21 February 2025
19:00

Australia	2–2	Belgium
Geddes 15'; Welch 53'	Report	Boon 36', 51'
Penalties
Brand (penalty shoot-out missed); Ephraums (penalty shoot-out scored); Willott (penalty shoot-out missed); Marais (penalty shoot-out scored); Welch (penalty shoot-out scored); Brand (penalty shoot-out missed)	3–4	(penalty shoot-out scored) Boccard; (penalty shoot-out missed) De Sloover; (penalty shoot-out missed) Van Dessel; (penalty shoot-out scored) Kina; (penalty shoot-out scored) Boon; (penalty shoot-out scored) Kina

Polideportivo Provincial, Santiago del Estero
Umpires:
Sean Edwards (ENG)
Sophie Bockelmann (GER)

21 February 2025
19:30

India	3–1	Ireland
Mandeep 22'; Jarmanpreet 45'; Sukhjeet 58'	Report	Duncan 8'

Kalinga Stadium, Bhubaneswar
Umpires:
Ahmed El-Sayed (EGY)
Wanri Venter (RSA)

22 February 2025
19:00

Argentina	0–1	Belgium
	Report	Boon 60'

Polideportivo Provincial, Santiago del Estero
Umpires:
Raphaël Adrien (GER)
Darren Hubach (RSA)

22 February 2025
19:30

India	4–0	Ireland
Nilam 14'; Mandeep 24'; Abhishek 28'; Shamsher 34'	Report

Kalinga Stadium, Bhubaneswar
Umpires:
Annelize Rostron (RSA)
Rawi Anbananthan (MAS)

23 February 2025
19:00

Argentina	1–0	Australia
Capurro 32'	Report

Polideportivo Provincial, Santiago del Estero
Umpires:
Raphaël Adrien (GER)
Sean Edwards (ENG)

24 February 2025
15:00

Germany	8–2	Ireland
Prinz 7'; Struthoff 10', 59'; Kaufmann 28'; Hartkopf 30'; Mertgens 42'; Schwarzhaupt 44'; Peillat 56'	Report	M. Nelson 27'; McKibbin 29'

Kalinga Stadium, Bhubaneswar
Umpires:
Rawi Anbananthan (MAS)
Junko Wagatsuma (JPN)

24 February 2025
19:00

Belgium	1–3	Australia
De Kerpel 48'	Report	Welch 14'; Ephraums 23'; Burns 44'

Polideportivo Provincial, Santiago del Estero
Umpires:
Sean Edwards (ENG)
Darren Hubach (RSA)

24 February 2025
19:30

India	2–3	England
Abhishek 18'; Sukhjeet 39'	Report	Payton 15'; Ward 19', 29'

Kalinga Stadium, Bhubaneswar
Umpires:
Bevan Nichol (NZL)
Timothy Sheahan (AUS)

25 February 2025
15:00

Ireland	2–4	Germany
M. Nelson 14'; B. Nelson 26'	Report	Kleinlein 21'; Prinz 29'; Hellwig 49', 57'

Kalinga Stadium, Bhubaneswar
Umpires:
Timothy Sheahan (AUS)
Bevan Nichol (NZL)

25 February 2025
19:30

India	2–1	England
Harmanpreet 26', 32'	Report	Williamson 30'

Kalinga Stadium, Bhubaneswar
Umpires:
Rawi Anbananthan (MAS)
Wanri Venter (RSA)

7 June 2025
13:30

Spain	0–1	Argentina
	Report	Della Torre 41'

Estadio Betero, Valencia
Umpires:
Jonas van't Hek (NEDI)
Pauline Cuypers (BEL)

7 June 2025
16:00

Netherlands	2–1	India
Van Dam 25', 58'	Report	Harmanpreet 19'

Wagener Stadium, Amsterdam
Umpires:
Łukasz Zwierzchowski (POL)
Sébastien Michielsen (BEL)

8 June 2025
13:30

Spain	3–2	Argentina
Iglesias 10'; N. Álvarez 22'; Ávila 25'	Report	Méndez 40'; Della Torre 55'

Estadio Betero, Valencia
Umpires:
Rebecca Edwards (ENG)
Daniël Veerman (NED)

9 June 2025
14:30

Netherlands	3–2	India
Van Dam 24'; Hoedemakers 33'; Janssen 57'	Report	Abhishek 20'; Jugraj 54'

Wagener Stadium, Amsterdam
Umpires:
Ben Göntgen (GER)
Magali Sergeant (BEL)

11 June 2025
15:00

Argentina	4–3	India
Rey 3'; Martínez 17'; Tarazona 34'; Méndez 46'	Report	Harmanpreet 12', 33'; Abhishek 42'

Wagener Stadium, Amsterdam
Umpires:
Michiel Otten (NED)
Coen van Bunge (NED)

11 June 2025
20:00

Netherlands	2–0	Ireland
Dommershuijzen 24'; Van Heijningen 38'	Report

Wagener Stadium, Amsterdam
Umpires:
Magali Sergeant (BEL)
Sébastien Michielsen (BEL)

12 June 2025
15:00

India	1–2	Argentina
Jugraj 4'	Report	T. Domene 9', 49'

Wagener Stadium, Amsterdam
Umpires:
Coen van Bunge (NED)
Michiel Otten (NED)

12 June 2025
20:00

Netherlands	6–2	Ireland
Janssen 24', 32'; Pieters 29'; Van der Heijden 37'; Troost 49'; Van Dam 60'	Report	B. Nelson 47', 59'

Wagener Stadium, Amsterdam
Umpires:
Ivona Makar (CRO)
Michael Dutrieux (BEL)

14 June 2025
10:30

Australia	3–2	India
Ephraums 42'; Rintala 56'; Craig 60'	Report	Abhishek 8', 35'

Wilrijkse Plein, Antwerp
Umpires:
Federico Silva (ARG)
Tim Meissner (GER)

14 June 2025
13:15

England	2–2	Germany
Wallace 38'; Rushmere 50'	Report	Schwarzhaupt 13'; L. Müller 48'
Penalties
Calnan (penalty shoot-out scored); Rushmere (penalty shoot-out missed); Goodfield (penalty shoot-out scored); Roper (penalty shoot-out missed); Wallace (penalty shoot-out scored); Sorsby (penalty shoot-out missed)	3–4	(penalty shoot-out scored) Struthoff; (penalty shoot-out scored) Von Montgelas; (penalty shoot-out scored) Prinz; (penalty shoot-out missed) Weigand; (penalty shoot-out scored) Hartkopf

Lee Valley Hockey and Tennis Centre, London
Umpires:
Jonathan van Hoesslin (RSA)
Alison Keogh (IRL)

14 June 2025
15:30

Belgium	5–1	Ireland
Boon 7', 28', 50'; Stockbroekx 22'; Duvekot 42'	Report	Rowe 34'

Wilrijkse Plein, Antwerp
Umpires:
Harry Collinson (ENG)
Daniël Veerman (NED)

14 June 2025
16:00

Netherlands	1–1	Argentina
Reyenga 36'	Report	Capurro 30'
Penalties
Croon (penalty shoot-out scored); Bijen (penalty shoot-out scored); Brinkman (penalty shoot-out scored); Middendorp (penalty shoot-out scored)	4–2	(penalty shoot-out scored) Méndez; (penalty shoot-out scored) Domene; (penalty shoot-out missed) Capurro; (penalty shoot-out missed) J. Toscani

Wagener Stadium, Amsterdam
Umpires:
Ben Göntgen (GER)
Łukasz Zwierzchowski (POL)

15 June 2025
10:30

India	2–3	Australia
Sanjay 3'; Dilpreet 36'	Report	Brand 4'; Govers 5'; Burns 18'

Wilrijkse Plein, Antwerp
Umpires:
Ahmed El-Sayed (EGY)
Paul Walker (ENG)

15 June 2025
12:45

England	2–3	Germany
Wallace 34', 40'	Report	Hinrichs 6'; Mazkour 39'; Hartkopf 55'

Lee Valley Hockey and Tennis Centre, London
Umpires:
Irene Presenqui (ARG)
Alison Keogh (IRL)

15 June 2025
15:30

Belgium	2–3	Ireland
De Kerpel 46'; Crols 60'	Report	Rowe 35'; Cole 43', 58'

Wilrijkse Plein, Antwerp
Umpires:
Aleisha Neumann (AUS)
Tim Meissner (GER)

15 June 2025
16:00

Netherlands	1–1	Argentina
Brinkman 29'	Report	Keenan 29'
Penalties
Van Dam (penalty shoot-out scored); Croon (penalty shoot-out scored); Brinkman (penalty shoot-out scored)	3–0	(penalty shoot-out missed) Méndez; (penalty shoot-out missed) Domene; (penalty shoot-out missed) L. Toscani

Wagener Stadium, Amsterdam
Umpires:
Ben Göntgen (GER)
Michael Dutrieux (BEL)

17 June 2025
13:15

England	2–3	Netherlands
Wallace 29'; Ward 39'	Report	Pieters 10'; Bijen 16', 25'

Lee Valley Hockey and Tennis Centre, London
Umpires:
Raphaël Adrien (GER)
Jonathan van Hoesslin (RSA)

17 June 2025
15:30

Australia	6–1	Ireland
Brand 3'; Govers 20', 58'; Burns 36'; Otterbach 42'; Welch 43'	Report	McKee 13'

Wilrijkse Plein, Antwerp
Umpires:
Ahmed El-Sayed (EGY)
Harry Collinson (ENG)

17 June 2025
20:30

Belgium	1–2	Spain
Onana 7'	Report	Basterra 22'; Ávila 25'

Wilrijkse Plein, Antwerp
Umpires:
Paul Walker (ENG)
Daniël Veerman (NED)

18 June 2025
15:30

Ireland	1–6	Australia
Cole 17'	Report	Ephraums 11', 22'; Hayward 21'; Marais 37'; Atkin 39'; Willott 57'

Wilrijkse Plein, Antwerp
Umpires:
Federico Silva (ARG)
Lorijn de Kraker (NED)

18 June 2025
20:00

England	1–1	Netherlands
Bhuhi 51'	Report	Janssen 43'
Penalties
Rushmere (penalty shoot-out scored); Goodfield (penalty shoot-out scored); Sorsby (penalty shoot-out missed); Waller (penalty shoot-out missed)	2–4	(penalty shoot-out scored) Croon; (penalty shoot-out scored) Van Dam; (penalty shoot-out scored) Brinkman; (penalty shoot-out scored) Middendorp

Lee Valley Hockey and Tennis Centre, London
Umpires:
Raphaël Adrien (GER)
Gemma Calderon (ESP)

18 June 2025
20:30

Belgium	6–3	Spain
Hendrickx 15+', 26'; Boon 18'; De Sloover 24'; Hellin 47'; Duvekot 59'	Report	M. Miralles 46'; N. Álvarez 51'; Pe. Cunill 55'

Wilrijkse Plein, Antwerp
Umpires:
Aleisha Neumann (AUS)
Harry Collinson (ENG)

21 June 2025
10:30

Ireland	2–4	Spain
McKee 3'; Cole 28'	Report	Ávila 15'; N. Álvarez 47', 58'; Pe. Cunill 58'

Wilrijkse Plein, Antwerp
Umpires:
Aleisha Neumann (AUS)
Paul Walker (ENG)

21 June 2025
15:30

England	3–4	Australia
Wallace 13'; Croft 24'; Hooper 30+'	Report	Burns 4'; Govers 39', 46', 47'

Lee Valley Hockey and Tennis Centre, London
Umpires:
Irene Presenqui (ARG)
Raphaël Adrien (GER)

21 June 2025
15:30

Belgium	6–3	India
Van Doren 1', 54'; Hendrickx 28'; Duvekot 49'; Stockbroekx 53'; Boon 59'	Report	Dilpreet 36'; Mandeep 38'; Amit 56'

Wilrijkse Plein, Antwerp
Umpires:
Tim Meissner (GER)
Daniël Veerman (NED)

21 June 2025
19:00

Germany	2–3	Argentina
Struthoff 7'; Kaufmann 18'	Report	Capurro 36'; Méndez 43'; Domene 44'

Ernst Reuter Sportfeld, Berlin
Umpires:
Paul van den Assum (NED)
Marcin Grochal (POL)

22 June 2025
10:30

Spain	9–1	Ireland
Pe. Cunill 3', 18'; N. Álvarez 7'; M. Miralles 8', 30', 35'; Iglesias 15'; Menini 19'; Bonastre 24'	Report	B. Nelson 50'

Wilrijkse Plein, Antwerp
Umpires:
Tim Meissner (GER)
Lorijn de Kraker (NED)

22 June 2025
14:30

England	2–1	Australia
Waller 31', 49'	Report	Brand 43'

Lee Valley Hockey and Tennis Centre, London
Umpires:
Jonathan van Hoesslin (RSA)
Gemma Calderon (ESP)

22 June 2025
15:30

Belgium	3–4	India
De Sloover 8'; Stockbroekx 34'; Labouchere 41'	Report	Sukhjeet 21', 35'; Amit 36'; Harmanpreet 59'

Wilrijkse Plein, Antwerp
Umpires:
Paul Walker (ENG)
Harry Collinson (ENG)

22 June 2025
19:00

Germany	4–3	Argentina
Weigand 42', 57'; H. Müller 51'; Grambusch 52'	Report	Keenan 2'; Domene 15', 21'

Ernst Reuter Sportfeld, Berlin
Umpires:
Hideki Kinoshita (JPN)
Marcin Grochal (POL)

24 June 2025
19:30

Germany	3–2	Australia
Peillat 19'; Mertgens 35'; Schwarzhaupt 38'	Report	Govers 3'; Rintala 8'

Ernst Reuter Sportfeld, Berlin
Umpires:
Hannah Harrison (ENG)
Hideki Kinoshita (JPN)

25 June 2025
19:30

Germany	5–0	Australia
Schwarzhaupt 5'; Hellwig 13', 26'; Ludwig 19'; Hartkopf 36'	Report

Ernst Reuter Sportfeld, Berlin
Umpires:
Hideki Kinoshita (JPN)
Ayanna McClean (TTO)

28 June 2025
13:00

Belgium	3–1	England
Duvekot 13'; Hendrickx 20'; Wegnez 42'	Report	Payton 48'

Wilrijkse Plein, Antwerp
Umpires:
Ole Ingwersen (GER)
Kamilė Mockaitytė (LTU)

28 June 2025
19:00

Germany	1–1	Spain
Struthoff 59'	Report	Cabré-Verdiell 46'
Penalties
Ludwig (penalty shoot-out missed); Grambusch (penalty shoot-out missed); Struthoff (penalty shoot-out missed); Prinz (penalty shoot-out missed)	0–3	(penalty shoot-out scored) Gispert; (penalty shoot-out scored) Bonastre; (penalty shoot-out scored) Miralles

Ernst Reuter Sportfeld, Berlin
Umpires:
Kristy Robertson (AUS)
Paul van den Assum (NED)

29 June 2025
13:00

Belgium	4–4	England
Hellin 12'; Hendrickx 35'; Boon 38', 50'	Report	Roper 9'; Calnan 17'; Wallace 55'; Sanford 57'
Penalties
Boon (penalty shoot-out scored); De Sloover (penalty shoot-out scored); A. Van Doren (penalty shoot-out missed); Wegnez (penalty shoot-out scored)	3–0	(penalty shoot-out missed) Rushmere; (penalty shoot-out missed) Wallace; (penalty shoot-out missed) Roper

Wilrijkse Plein, Antwerp
Umpires:
Ben Göntgen (GER)
Ivona Makar (CRO)

29 June 2025
19:00

Germany	0–2	Spain
	Report	Petchamé 29'; Gispert 50'

Ernst Reuter Sportfeld, Berlin
Umpires:
Paul van den Assum (NED)
Hannah Harrison (ENG)

== Goalscorers ==
There were 343 goals scored in 72 matches, for an average of 4.76 goals per match.

21 goals

- (Belgium) Tom Boon

12 goals

- (England) Sam Ward

10 goals

- (Argentina) Tomás Domene

9 goals

- (Spain) Nicolás Álvarez

8 goals

- (England) Zachary Wallace

7 goals

- (Australia) Blake Govers
- (Belgium) Thibeau Stockbroekx
- (Netherlands) Koen Bijen

6 goals

- (Australia) Cooper Burns
- (Germany) Raphael Hartkopf
- (India) Harmanpreet Singh
- (Ireland) Lee Cole
- (India) Abhishek Nain

5 goals

- (Argentina) Bautista Capurro
- (Belgium) Roman Duvekot
- (Belgium) Alexander Hendrickx
- (Germany) Thies Prinz
- (Germany) Benedikt Schwarzhaupt
- (Germany) Michel Struthoff
- (India) Sukhjeet Singh
- (Ireland) Benjamin Nelson
- (Netherlands) Thijs van Dam
- (Netherlands) Jip Janssen
- (Spain) Pepe Cunill

4 goals

- (Australia) Tim Brand
- (Australia) Nathan Ephraums
- (Australia) Ky Willott
- (Belgium) Guillaume Hellin
- (Germany) Malte Hellwig
- (Germany) Gonzalo Peillat
- (India) Mandeep Singh
- (Netherlands) Pepijn van der Heijden
- (Spain) Bruno Ávila
- (Spain) Marc Miralles

3 goals

- (Argentina) Lucio Méndez
- (Australia) Jeremy Hayward
- (Australia) Jack Welch
- (England) Samuel Hooper
- (England) Jacob Payton
- (England) Stuart Rushmere
- (England) Jack Waller
- (India) Dilpreet Singh
- (Netherlands) Thierry Brinkman

2 goals

- (Argentina) Nicolás Della Torre
- (Argentina) Nicolás Keenan
- (Australia) Davis Atkin
- (Australia) Joel Rintala
- (Australia) Benjamin White
- (Belgium) Arthur Van Doren
- (Belgium) Nicolas De Kerpel
- (Belgium) Arthur De Sloover
- (England) Rohan Bhuhi
- (Germany) Paul-Philipp Kaufmann
- (Germany) Elian Mazkour
- (Germany) Henrik Mertgens
- (Germany) Florian Sperling
- (Germany) Justus Weigand
- (India) Amit Rohidas
- (India) Gurjant Singh
- (India) Jugraj Singh
- (Ireland) John McKee
- (Ireland) Matthew Nelson
- (Ireland) Louis Rowe
- (Netherlands) Miles Bukkens
- (Netherlands) Steijn van Heijningen
- (Netherlands) Tjep Hoedemakers
- (Netherlands) Terrance Pieters
- (Spain) José Basterra
- (Spain) Álvaro Iglesias
- (Spain) Joaquín Menini
- (Spain) Borja Lacalle
- (Spain) Pau Petchamé

1 goal

- (Argentina) Thomas Habif
- (Argentina) Lucas Martínez
- (Argentina) Felipe Merlini
- (Argentina) Matías Rey
- (Argentina) Santiago Tarazona
- (Argentina) Lucas Toscani
- (Australia) Tom Craig
- (Australia) Cambell Geddes
- (Australia) Jake Harvie
- (Australia) Craig Marais
- (Australia) Connar Otterbach
- (Belgium) Thomas Crols
- (Belgium) William Ghislain
- (Belgium) Hugo Labouchere
- (Belgium) Nelson Onana
- (Belgium) Victor Wegnez
- (England) James Albery
- (England) Will Calnan
- (England) Henry Croft
- (England) Matthew Ramshaw
- (England) Phil Roper
- (England) Liam Sanford
- (England) Williamson
- (Germany) Tom Grambusch
- (Germany) Teo Hinrichs
- (Germany) Erik Kleinlein
- (Germany) Moritz Ludwig
- (Germany) Hannes Müller
- (Germany) Linus Müller
- (Germany) Martin Zwicker
- (India) Sanjay Rana
- (India) Nilam Sanjeep Xess
- (India) Jarmanpreet Singh
- (India) Shamsher Singh
- (Ireland) Jeremy Duncan
- (Ireland) Alistair Empey
- (Ireland) Jonathan Lynch
- (Ireland) Peter McKibbin
- (Ireland) Adam Walker
- (Netherlands) Luke Dommershuijzen
- (Netherlands) Tijmen Reyenga
- (Netherlands) Joep Troost
- (Netherlands) Casper van der Veen
- (Netherlands) Lucas Veen
- (Netherlands) Derck de Vilder
- (Spain) Jordi Bonastre
- (Spain) Pol Cabré-Verdiell
- (Spain) Gerard Clapés
- (Spain) Ignacio Cobos
- (Spain) Pau Cunill
- (Spain) Bruno Font
- (Spain) Xavier Gispert

Source: FIH

== See also ==
- 2024–25 Women's FIH Pro League
