= Peter McKibbin =

Irish field hockey player

Personal information
- Born: 19 March 1997 (age 29) Belfast, Northern Ireland

Sport
- Sport: Field hockey
- Position: Midfield
- Club: Lisnagarvey
National team
Years	Team	Caps	Goals
2014–2017	Ireland U–21	8	(0)
2019–	Ireland	70	(1)
Medal record
Men's field hockey
Representing Ireland
FIH Nations Cup
Silver medal – second place	2022–23 Potchefstroom
EuroHockey Championship II
Gold medal – first place	2023 Dublin
Bronze medal – third place	2021 Gniezno
FIH Olympic Qualifiers
Bronze medal – third place	2024 Valencia

Peter McKibbin (born 19 March 1997) is a field hockey player from Northern Ireland.

== Personal life ==
McKibbin grew up in Comber, a town in County Down, Northern Ireland.

He is an alumnus of Regent House School and Ulster University, holding a degree in sport and exercise science from the latter.

== Field hockey ==
=== Domestic league ===
McKibbin currently competes in the Irish Hockey League, where he plays for Lisnagarvey Hockey Club. He has also represented the side in the Euro Hockey League, the top club competition hosted by the European Hockey Federation.

He also previously competed in the German Bundesliga for Großflottbeker.

=== Under–21 ===
Between 2014 and 2017, McKibbin represented the Ireland U–21 team. Appearing for the team sporadically, he made his final junior appearances at the 2017 EuroHockey U–21 Championship in Valencia, where the team finished in seventh place.

=== Senior national team ===
McKibbin made his senior international debut for Ireland in 2019. He earned his first senior international cap in a test match against Scotland in Glasgow.

He did not represent the team again until 2021, where he helped the team to bronze at the EuroHockey Championship II in Gniezno. Since then, he has been a regular inclusion in the national squad, winning another two medals on two more occasions. He took home silver at the inaugural edition of the FIH Nations Cup in Potchefstroom in 2022, as well as gold at the 2023 edition of the EuroHockey Championship II in Dublin.

In 2024 he helped Ireland qualify for the XXXIII Olympic Games, finishing third at the FIH Olympic Qualifiers in Valencia. Later that year, he officially became an Olympian. He competed in the field hockey competition for Team Ireland at the Olympic Games in Paris.

He has appeared in seasons five and six of the FIH Pro League, and has been named to represent the national team at the 2025 EuroHockey Championship II in Lousada.
