= Nicolás Álvarez (field hockey) =

Spanish field hockey player (born 2003)

Personal information
- Full name: Nicolás Álvarez Nárdiz
- Born: 4 January 2003 (age 23) Santander, Spain

Sport
- Sport: Field hockey
- Position: Forward
Senior career
Years	Team	Caps	Goals
–	RS Tenis	-	-
National team
Years	Team	Caps	Goals
2023–2024	Spain U–21	15	(10)
2024–	Spain	13	(6)
Medal record
Men's field hockey
Representing Spain
World Cup
Silver medal – second place	2026 Wavre/Amstelveen
EuroHockey Championships
Bronze medal – third place	2025 Mönchengladbach
FIH Junior World Cup
Bronze medal – third place	2023 Kuala Lumpur	Team
EuroHockey U–21 Championship
Gold medal – first place	2024 Terrassa	Team

Nicolás Álvarez Nárdiz (born 4 January 2003) is a field hockey player from Spain.

== Personal life ==
Nicolás Álvarez was born and raised in Santander, Spain. His sister, Patricia Álvarez, is also an international field hockey player for Spain.

== Field hockey ==
=== Domestic league ===
In the Spanish national league, the Liga Iberdrola, Álvarez represents RS Tenis.

=== Under–21 ===
Álvarez made his debut for the Spanish U–21 side in 2023. He made his first appearances during a Four–Nations Tournament in Düsseldorf. He went on to represent the team again later that year at the FIH Junior World Cup in Kuala Lumpur. At the tournament, he helped secure the side a bronze medal.

He won a second medal with the junior team in 2024, taking home gold at the EuroHockey U21 Championship in Terrassa.

=== Red Sticks ===
Following his successful Junior World Cup campaign, Álvarez was selected in the Red Sticks squad for the first time. He made his senior international debut during the fifth season of the FIH Pro League, in a match against Australia in Bhubaneswar. He marked the occasion with a goal on debut.

Álvarez has since been included in the squad for the sixth season of the FIH Pro League.

== International goals ==
The following is a list of goals scored by Álvarez at international level.

Goal	Date	Location	Opponent	Score	Result	Competition	Ref.
1	11 February 2024	Kalinga Stadium, Bhubaneswar, India	Australia	2–3	3–4	2023–24 FIH Pro League	
2	1 June 2024	Wilrijkse Plein, Antwerp, Belgium	Belgium	1–3	1–4	2023–24 FIH Pro League	
3	4 February 2025	Sydney Olympic Park, Sydney, Australia	Netherlands	1–4	2–4	2024–25 FIH Pro League	
4	5 February 2025	Sydney Olympic Park, Sydney, Australia	Australia	2–0	2–1	2024–25 FIH Pro League	
5	18 February 2025	Kalinga Stadium, Bhubaneswar, India	England	1–2	2–2	2024–25 FIH Pro League	
6	19 February 2025	Kalinga Stadium, Bhubaneswar, India	England	4–0	4–1	2024–25 FIH Pro League	
