= Roman Duvekot =

Spanish field hockey player (born 2001)

Personal information
- Born: 21 June 2000 (age 26) Belgium

Sport
- Sport: Field hockey
- Position: Forward
- Club: Gantoise
National team
Years	Team	Caps	Goals
2019–2021	Belgium U–21	16	(6)
2019–	Belgium	20	(7)
Medal record
Men's field hockey
Representing Belgium
FIH Pro League
Silver medal – second place	Season Six	Team

Roman Duvekot (born 21 June 2000) is an international field hockey player from Belgium.

== Field hockey ==
=== Domestic league ===
Duvekot currently competes in the Carlsberg 0.0 Hockey League for Gantoise. He has also represented the team in the Euro Hockey League, the top-level club competition of the European Hockey Federation, winning the title at the 2024–25 edition.

=== Under–21 ===
In 2019, Duvekot made hist first appearances for the Belgium U–21 team. He represented the squad at an Eight Nations Tournament in Madrid, helping the side to a third-place finish. Later that year he represented the team again at the EuroHockey U–21 Championship in Valencia where the team finished fifth.

After not representing the national junior team for two years, Duvekot made his final appearances with the team at the 2021 FIH Junior World Cup in Bhubaneswar.

=== Red Lions ===
Duvekot made his senior international debut for the Red Lions in 2019. He earned his first senior international cap during a test match against India in Brussels.

Following a number of senior player retirements following the 2024 Summer Olympics, Duvekot was raised into the squad permanently. He helped the side to a silver medal in the sixth season of the FIH Pro League. He was also named in the final squad for the 2025 EuroHockey Championship in Mönchengladbach.
