= Sam Taylor (field hockey) =

English field hockey player (born 2001)

Personal information
- Born: 11 July 2001 (age 25) Chudleigh, England

Sport
- Sport: Field hockey
- Position: Defender
Senior career
Years	Team	Caps	Goals
2019–2020	Ashmoor	-	-
2021–2022	Exeter Univ	-	-
2022–2026	Holcombe	-	-
National team
Years	Team	Caps	Goals
2022–2026	England	8	(0)

Samuel Taylor (born 11 July 2001) is an English field hockey player who plays as a defender for the England men's national field hockey team and Great Britain men's national field hockey team.

== Biography ==
Taylor attended South Dartmoor Community College and Plymouth Marjon University and as a teenager played for Ashmoor Hockey Club. He played county hockey at U10 and U12 level and represented the West of England.

After making the England U18 he played as an over age player for the U21s at the 2022 EuroHockey Championships before making his full senior international debut for the England team on 5 February 2022 against Spain.

Since 2022 Taylor has played for Holcombe Hockey Club in the Men's England Hockey League. It was also during 2022 that he was called up to the Great Britain training squad. Taylor also coaches hockey at Reigate Grammar School.

On 29 January 2026 he was called up for England for the 2025–26 Men's FIH Pro League matches in Valencia, Spain from 6 to 10 February 2026.
