= Bruno Font =

Spanish field hockey player (born 2004)

Personal information
- Full name: Bruno Font Abad
- Born: 15 November 2004 (age 21) Sant Cugat del Vallés, Spain

Sport
- Sport: Field hockey
- Position: Midfield
- Club: Junior
National team
Years	Team	Caps	Goals
2022–	Spain U–21	15	(4)
2023–	Spain	39	(3)
Medal record
Men's field hockey
Representing Spain
World Cup
Silver medal – second place	2026 Wavre/Amstelveen
EuroHockey Championships
Bronze medal – third place	2025 Mönchengladbach
FIH Junior World Cup
Bronze medal – third place	2023 Kuala Lumpur	Team

Bruno Font Abad (born 15 November 2004) is a field hockey player from Spain.

== Personal life ==
Bruno Font was born and raised in Sant Cugat del Vallés, Spain.

He is a student at the Universitat Politècnica de Catalunya, also known as BarcelonaTech.

== Field hockey ==
=== Domestic league ===
In the Spanish national league, the Liga IATI, Font represents Junior.

=== Under–21 ===
Font made his debut for the Spanish U–21 side in 2022. He made his first appearances during the EuroHockey U–21 Championship in Ghent.

In 2023 he continued to represent the national junior squad. He made his first appearances for the year at Four–Nations Tournament in Düsseldorf. He went on to represent the team again later that year at the FIH Junior World Cup in Kuala Lumpur. At the tournament, he helped secure the side a bronze medal.

=== Red Sticks ===
Font made his senior international debut for the Red Sticks during the fourth season of the FIH Pro League. His first appearance came during a match against Australia in Hobart.

In 2024, Font was a member of the Spanish squad at the Olympic Games in Paris.

He has since been included in the squad for the sixth season of the FIH Pro League.

== International goals ==
The following is a list of goals scored by Font at international level.

Goal	Date	Location	Opponent	Score	Result	Competition	Ref.
1	2 March 2023	Tasmanian Hockey Centre, Hobart, Australia	Argentina	1–2	4–3	2022–23 FIH Pro League	
2	30 July 2023	Club Ègara, Terrassa, Spain	Netherlands	1–0	1–1	Test Match	
3	18 February 2025	Kalinga Stadium, Bhubaneswar, India	England	2–2	2–2	2024–25 FIH Pro League	
