= Henry Croft (field hockey) =

English field hockey player (born 2001)

Personal information
- Born: 13 April 2001 (age 25) Nottingham, England

Sport
- Sport: Field hockey
- Position: Forward
Senior career
Years	Team	Caps	Goals
2021–2025	Beeston	-	-
2025–2026	Old Georgians	-	-
National team
Years	Team	Caps	Goals
2024–2026	Great Britain	2	(1)
2025–2026	England	7	(1)

Henry Croft (born 13 April 2001) is an English field hockey player who plays as a forward for Great Britain and the England.

== Biography ==
Croft began his career playing for Beeston Hockey Club in the Men's England Hockey League and progressed through the England U18 and Great Britain U23 teams.

An asphalt salesman by trade, Croft made his Great Britain debut against Ireland on 1 June 2024. This led to his selection for the Great Britain centralised programme.

He made his England debut during the 2024–25 Men's FIH Pro League in India.

For the 2025–26 Men's England Hockey League season, he left Beeston to join Old Georgians Hockey Club. He won the 2026 Premier league title with Old Georgians.
