= Jacob Payton =

English field hockey player (born 2001)

Personal information
- Born: 10 June 2002 (age 24) England

Sport
- Sport: Field hockey
- Position: Midfield
Senior career
| Years | Team | Caps | Goals |
| –2021 | Cheltenham | - | - |
| 2021–2024 | Exeter Univ | - | - |
| 2024–2026 | Surbiton | - | - |
National team
| Years | Team | Caps | Goals |
| 2025– | England | | - |

Jacob Payton (born 10 June 2002) is an English field hockey player who plays as a midfielder for the England men's national field hockey team.

== Biography ==
Payton was educated at Dean Close School and studied Business Economics at the University of Exeter.

He began playing hockey at Cheltenham Hockey Club before he went to Exeter and while at university played for the University of Exeter Hockey Club in the Men's England Hockey League and played for the England U21 team from 2022 to 2023.

After university he signed for Surbiton Hockey Club for the 2024–25 season. In December 2024, Payton was added to the Great Britain senior programme and shortly afterwards made his full senior England debut on 12 December 2024 during the Men's FIH Pro League in Argentina.

He was part of the England team that was selected for the 2025 Men's EuroHockey Championship in Mönchengladbach, where England finished in sixth place.
