= Moritz Ludwig =

German field hockey player

Personal information
- Born: 14 September 2001 (age 24)

Sport
- Sport: Field hockey
Medal record
Olympic Games
Silver medal – second place	2024 Paris	Team
World Cup
Gold medal – first place	2026 Wavre/Amstelveen
EuroHockey Championships
Gold medal – first place	2025 Mönchengladbach

Moritz Ludwig (born 14 September 2001) is a German field hockey player. He represented Germany at the 2024 Summer Olympics.
