= Xavier Gispert =

Spanish field hockey player (born 1999)

Personal information
- Born: 1 April 1999 (age 27)

Sport
- Sport: Field hockey
Medal record
World Cup
Silver medal – second place	2026 Wavre/Amstelveen
EuroHockey Championships
Bronze medal – third place	2025 Mönchengladbach

Xavier Gispert (born 1 April 1999) is a Spanish field hockey player. He represented Spain at the 2024 Summer Olympics.
