= Men's FIH Pro League =

Men's field hockey competition

- Current season, competition or edition: 2026–27 Men's FIH Pro League
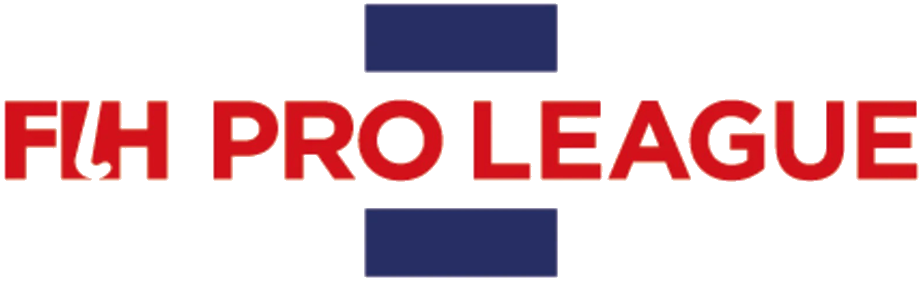
- Formerly: Hockey World League
- Sport: Field hockey
- Founded: 2017; 9 years ago
- First season: 2019
- No. of teams: 9
- Continent: International (FIH)
- Most recent champion: Belgium (2nd title) (2025–26)
- Most titles: Netherlands (3 titles)
- Relegation to: FIH Hockey Nations Cup
- Website: fihproleague.com

The Men's FIH Pro League is an international men's field hockey competition organised by the International Hockey Federation. It replaced the Men's FIH Hockey World League. The tournament serves as a qualifier for the Men's Hockey World Cup and for the Olympic Games.

== Format ==
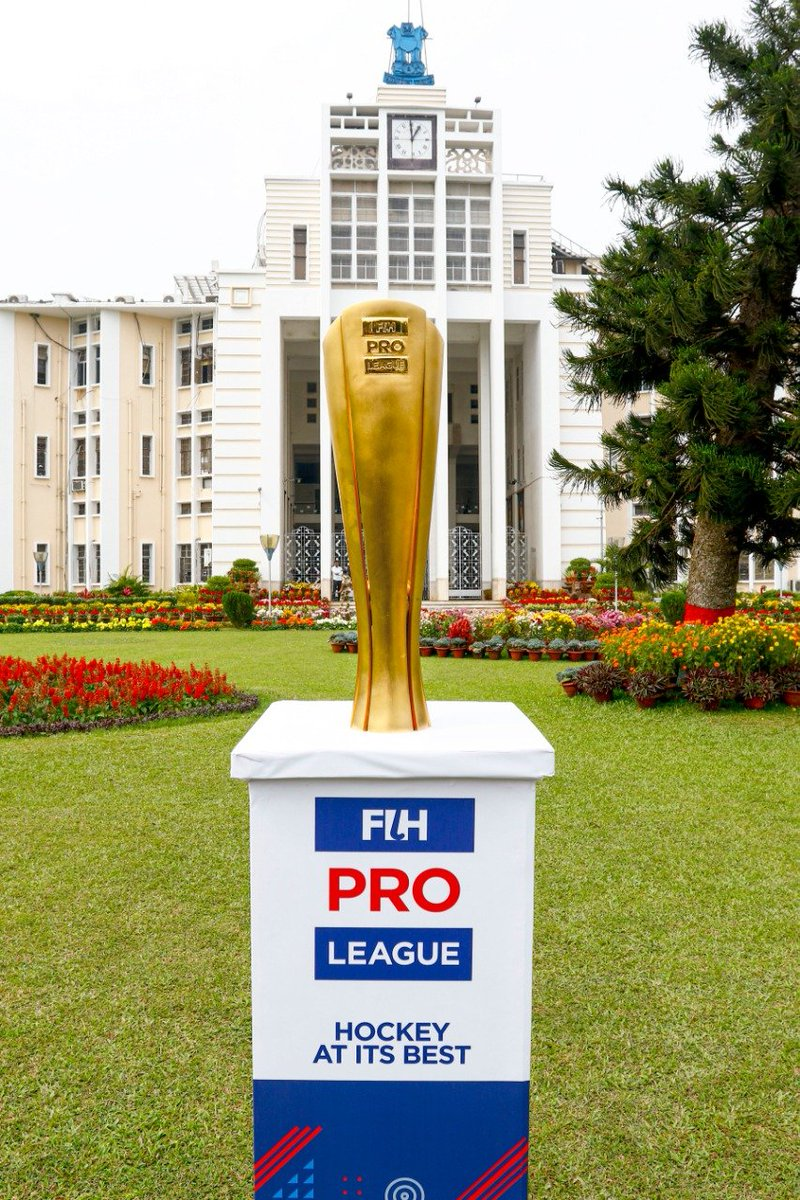
FIH Pro League Trophy

Nine men's and women's teams compete in a round-robin tournament with home and away matches, played from October to June, with the top team at the end of the season winning the league. From 2022–23 onwards, the bottom team at the end of the season will be relegated and will be replaced by the winner of a new competition called the Men's FIH Nations Cup.

== Teams ==
In July 2017, Hockey India decided to withdraw both the men's and women's national teams from the competition as they estimated the chances of qualifying for the Summer Olympics to be higher when participating in the Men's FIH Hockey World League. Hockey India also cited lack of clarity in the ranking system. The International Hockey Federation subsequently invited Spain instead. Pakistan were suspended in 2019 after they could not play their first three games. India joined the Pro League from 2020 onwards. In September 2021, both New Zealand and Australia withdrew from the 2021–22 season due to the COVID-19 pandemic and the travel restrictions coming with it.

Current teams

- Argentina
- Australia
- Belgium
- France
- Germany
- Great Britain
- India
- Netherlands
- Spain

Former teams

- Pakistan (relegated from 2025–26 season)
- New Zealand (withdrew for the 2025–26 season)
- Ireland (relegated from 2024–25 season)
- South Africa (competed in the 2021–22 season)

== Results ==
Ed.	Year	Final host	Final			Third place match			Teams GS / FR
Ed.	Year	Final host	Champions	Score	Runners-up	Third place	Score	Fourth place	Teams GS / FR
1	2019	Amstelveen, Netherlands	Australia	3–2	Belgium	Netherlands	5–3	Great Britain	8 / 4
2	2020–21	(Various)	Belgium	Round-robin	Australia	Germany	Round-robin	India	9
3 (Note: Australia and New Zealand withdrew from the tournament before it began, being replaced by Canada and South Africa. Six weeks after being declared New Zealand's replacement, Canada withdrew and was replaced by France.)	2021–22	(Various)	Netherlands	Round-robin	Belgium	India	Round-robin	Germany	9
4	2022–23	(Various)	Netherlands	Round-robin	Great Britain	Belgium	Round-robin	India	9
5	2023–24	(Various)	Australia	Round-robin	Netherlands	Great Britain	Round-robin	Argentina	9
6	2024–25	(Various)	Netherlands	Round-robin	Belgium	Spain	Round-robin	Germany	9
7	2025–26	(Various)	Belgium	Round-robin	England	Australia	Round-robin	Netherlands	9

== Performance by nations ==
Team	Winners	Runners-up	Third place	Fourth place
Netherlands	3 (2021–22, 2022–23, 2024–25)	1 (2023–24)	1 (2019)	1 (2025–26)
Belgium	2 (2020–21, 2025–26)	3 (2019, 2021–22, 2024–25)	1 (2022–23)	
Australia	2 (2019, 2023–24)	1 (2020–21)	1 (2025–26)	
Great Britain		1 (2022–23)	1 (2023–24)	1 (2019)
England		1 (2025–26)		
India			1 (2021–22)	2 (2020–21, 2022–23)
Germany			1 (2020–21)	2 (2021–22, 2024–25)
Spain			1 (2024–25)	
Argentina				1 (2023–24)

=== Team appearances ===
Team	2019	2020–21	2021–22	2022–23	2023–24	2024–25	2025–26	2026–27	Total
Argentina	5th	7th	5th	8th	4th	6th	5th	Q	8
Australia	1st	2nd	WD	7th	1st	5th	3rd	Q	7
Belgium	2nd	1st	2nd	3rd	5th	2nd	1st	Q	8
Canada	–	–	WD	–	–	–	–	–	0
England	Part of GB		6th	Part of GB		7th	2nd	Part of GB	3
France	–	–	8th	–	–	–	–	Q	2
Germany	6th	3rd	4th	6th	6th	4th	6th	Q	8
Great Britain	4th	6th	–	2nd	3rd	–	–	Q	5
India	–	4th	3rd	4th	7th	8th	8th	Q	7
Ireland	–	–	–	–	9th ▼	9th ▼	–	–	2
Netherlands	3rd	5th	1st	1st	2nd	1st	4th	Q	8
New Zealand	8th	8th	WD	9th ▼	–	WD	WD	–	3
Pakistan	DSQ	–	–	–	–	–	9th ▼	–	1
South Africa	–	–	9th	–	WD	–	–	–	1
Spain	7th	9th	7th	5th	8th	3rd	7th	Q	8
Total	8	9	9	9	9	9	9	9	

== See also ==
- Women's FIH Pro League
- Hockey Series
- Men's FIH Hockey World League
- Men's FIH Hockey Nations Cup
