= 2019–20 Men's Hoofdklasse Hockey =

Hoofdklasse
- Season: 2019–20
- Dates: 14 September 2019 – 12 March 2020
- Euro Hockey League: Bloemendaal
- EHL Cup: Kampong; Den Bosch
- Matches: 90
- Goals: 420 (4.67 per match)
- Top goalscorer: Tim Swaen (18 goals)
- Biggest home win: Bloemendaal 6–0 Hurley; Amsterdam 7–1 Almere; Amsterdam 7–1 Rotterdam
- Biggest away win: Tilburg 0–6 HGC
- Highest scoring: Amsterdam 7–3 HGC

The 2019–20 Hoofdklasse was the 47th season of the Hoofdklasse, the Netherlands's highest field hockey league. It started on 14 September 2019 and it was scheduled to conclude with the third match of the championship final on 24 May 2020. Due to the COVID-19 pandemic the league was halted on 12 March 2020. The league was declared void on 21 April 2020.

Bloemendaal were the defending champions, having won the 2018–19 season by defeating Kampong in the championship final.

The KNHB decided there will be no relegation and promotion and there won't be a champion. The assignment of the places for the 2021 Euro Hockey League depended on the proceeding of the 2019–20 Euro Hockey League. Bloemendaal was the only team who was qualified regardless.

== Teams ==
2019–20 Men's Hoofdklasse teams

A total of 12 teams took part in the league: The best nine teams from the 2018–19 season, the two promotion/relegation play-off winners (Klein Zwitserland and Tilburg) and the 2018–19 Promotieklasse winners (Hurley), who replaced SCHC.

=== Accommodation and locations ===
Team	Location	Province	Accommodation
Almere	Almere	Flevoland	Sportpark Klein Brandt
Amsterdam	Amstelveen	North Holland	Wagener Stadium
Bloemendaal	Bloemendaal	North Holland	Sportpark 't Kopje
Den Bosch	's-Hertogenbosch	North Brabant	Sportpark Oosterplas
HGC	Wassenaar	South Holland	De Roggewoning
Hurley	Amstelveen	North Holland	Amsterdamse Bos
Kampong	Utrecht	Utrecht	De Klapperboom
Klein Zwitserland	The Hague	South Holland	Sportpark Klein Zwitserland
Oranje-Rood	Eindhoven	North Brabant	Sportpark Aalsterweg
Pinoké	Amstelveen	North Holland	Amsterdamse Bos
Rotterdam	Rotterdam	South Holland	Hazelaarweg Stadion
Tilburg	Tilburg	North Brabant	Sportpark Oude Warande

=== Personnel and kits ===
Team	Trainer-coach	Captain	Kit manufacturer	Shirt sponsor
Almere	(Netherlands) Pasha Gademan	(Netherlands) Robin Herweijer	Indian Maharadja	ABN AMRO
Amsterdam	(Spain) Santi Freixa	(Netherlands) Billy Bakker	Adidas	ABN AMRO
Bloemendaal	(Netherlands) Michel van den Heuvel	(Netherlands) Glenn Schuurman	Osaka	ABN AMRO
Den Bosch	(Netherlands) Jeroen Verboom	(South Africa) Austin Smith	Indian Maharadja	Rabobank
HGC	(Netherlands) Paul van Ass	(Netherlands) Seve van Ass	Indian Maharadja	ABN AMRO
Hurley	(Netherlands) Reinoud Wolff	(Netherlands) Thom Hayward	Osaka	Rabobank
Kampong	(Netherlands) Alexander Cox	(Netherlands) Sander de Wijn	Reece	Rabobank
Klein Zwitserland	(Argentina) Carlos Castaño	(Netherlands) Steven van Rhede van der Kloot	TK	Tikkie
Oranje-Rood	(Netherlands) Robert van der Horst	(Belgium) Thomas Briels	Reece	ABN AMRO
Pinoké	(Netherlands) Jesse Mahieu	(Netherlands) Jannis van Hattum	Adidas	Simpel
Rotterdam	(Netherlands) Albert Kees Maneschijn	(Netherlands) Jeroen Hertzberger	Osaka	ABN AMRO
Tilburg	(Netherlands) Jeroen Delmee	(Netherlands) Jip Krens	Adidas	Rabobank

=== Number of teams by province ===
Province	Number of teams	Teams
North Holland	4	Amsterdam, Bloemendaal, Hurley and Pinoké
North Brabant	3	Den Bosch, Oranje-Rood and Tilburg
South Holland	3	HGC, Klein Zwitserland and Rotterdam
Utrecht	1	Kampong
Flevoland	1	Almere
Total	12	

== Regular season ==
=== League table ===
Pos	Team	Pld	W	D	L	GF	GA	GD	Pts	Qualification or relegation
1	Bloemendaal	15	13	2	0	54	18	+36	41	Qualification for the Euro Hockey League
2	Den Bosch	15	11	1	3	39	22	+17	34	Qualification for the Euro Hockey League Cup
3	HGC	15	10	2	3	45	30	+15	32	
4	Kampong	15	8	3	4	42	31	+11	27	Qualification for the Euro Hockey League Cup (Note: Kampong qualified for the Euro Hockey League Cup after the cancellation of the 2019–20 season's Final 8.)
5	Rotterdam	15	8	3	4	38	32	+6	27	
6	Oranje-Rood	15	7	2	6	40	33	+7	23	
7	Amsterdam	15	6	5	4	44	28	+16	23	
8	Pinoké	15	6	3	6	36	33	+3	21	
9	Tilburg	15	4	1	10	25	43	−18	13	
10	Klein Zwitserland	15	3	1	11	17	43	−26	10	
11	Hurley	15	1	1	13	24	51	−27	4	
12	Almere	15	0	2	13	20	60	−40	2	

Source: TheSports.org

=== Results ===
Home \ Away	ALM	AMS	BLO	DBO	HGC	HUR	KAM	KZ	OR	PIN	ROT	TIL
Almere	—	1–3		1–2		3–5	3–4		1–5	3–4	1–4	2–2
Amsterdam	7–1	—	1–2	2–3	7–3			1–0	2–2	3–3	7–1	
Bloemendaal	4–0		—	3–1	4–0	6–0	2–1			3–2	1–1	
Den Bosch	5–0			—		2–1	2–1	4–1	3–2	3–1	2–3	3–1
HGC	5–1		2–3	3–2	—	2–2	2–2	2–1			3–0	
Hurley		3–4	1–5		1–4	—	1–4	1–2	0–3			2–4
Kampong		4–3	2–2			4–2	—	4–1	1–3	3–1		2–1
Klein Zwitserland	1–1		1–5	0–2	0–2		2–5	—		1–5	1–4	2–1
Oranje-Rood	3–1	1–1	2–4	2–4	4–5			4–1	—	1–2		3–2
Pinoké	6–1	1–1	4–5		1–2	1–0	3–3			—		2–1
Rotterdam		2–2		1–1	2–4	4–3	3–2		3–1	3–0	—	5–1
Tilburg		1–0	0–5		0–6	3–2		2–3	3–4		3–2	—

Source: Flashscore
Legend: Blue = home team win; Yellow = draw; Red = away team win.

=== Top goalscorers ===
As of 8 March 2020

Rank	Player	Club	FG	PC	PS	Goals
1	(Netherlands) Tim Swaen	Bloemendaal	0	16	2	18
2	(Netherlands) Jip Janssen	Kampong	0	17	0	17
3	(Argentina) Maico Casella	HGC	12	4	0	16
3	(Belgium) Tanguy Cosyns	Amsterdam	3	13	0	16
3	(Belgium) Alexander Hendrickx	Pinoké	0	13	3	16
6	(Netherlands) Jeroen Hertzberger	Rotterdam	8	5	2	15
8	(Netherlands) Roel Bovendeert	Bloemendaal	12	1	0	13
8	(Netherlands) Mink van der Weerden	Oranje-Rood	0	12	1	13
9	(Netherlands) Mirco Pruyser	Amsterdam	8	2	2	12
10	(Netherlands) Boet Phijffer	Kampong	8	1	0	9
10	(Belgium) Sébastien Dockier	Den Bosch	8	1	0	9
10	(Netherlands) Seve van Ass	HGC	3	4	2	9
