= 2025–26 Men's Hoofdklasse Hockey =

Hoofdklasse
- Season: 2025–26
- Dates: 13 September 2024 – 11 May 2025
- Champions: Rotterdam (2nd title)
- Relegated: Hurley; Laren
- Euro Hockey League: Rotterdam; Amsterdam; Oranje-Rood
- Matches: 132
- Goals: 671 (5.08 per match)
- Best player: Struan Walker
- Top goalscorer: Timo Boers (31 goals)
- Biggest home win: Rotterdam 9–0 Hurley (5 October 2025); Amsterdam 9–0 Laren (5 October 2025); Den Bosch 9–0 Schaerweijde (26 October 2025)
- Biggest away win: Hurley 1–8 Pinoké (8 March 2026); Schaerweijde 1–8 Den Bosch (19 April 2026)
- Highest scoring: Amsterdam 8–6 Den Bosch (21 September 2025)

The 2025–26 Men's Hoofdklasse Hockey, also known as the Tulp Hoofdklasse Men for sponsorship reasons, is the 53rd season of the Men's Hoofdklasse Hockey, the top Dutch field hockey league. The season began on 13 September 2025 and will conclude in May 2026 with the second match of the championship final.

In the championship's playoff final, the defending champions Amsterdam were defeated by Rotterdam with a score of 5–4 on aggregate.

== Teams ==
2025–26 Men's Hoofdklasse teams

Twelve teams compete in the league - the top nine teams from the previous season, the winner of the 2024–25 Promotieklasse and the two winners of the 2024–25 relegation play-offs. Laren won the 2024–25 Promotieklasse and replaced Nijmegen. Hurley and Schaerweijde won the relegation play-offs.

=== Accommodation and locations ===
| Team | Location | Province | Accommodation |
|---|---|---|---|
| Amsterdam | Amstelveen | North Holland | Wagener Stadium |
| Bloemendaal | Bloemendaal | North Holland | Sportpark 't Kopje |
| Den Bosch | 's-Hertogenbosch | North Brabant | Sportpark Oosterplas |
| HDM | The Hague | South Holland | Sportpark Duinzigt |
| Hurley | Amstelveen | North Holland | Amsterdamse Bos |
| Kampong | Utrecht | Utrecht | De Klapperboom |
| Klein Zwitserland | The Hague | South Holland | Sportpark Klein Zwitserland |
| Laren | Laren | North Holland | Sportpark Eemnesserweg |
| Oranje-Rood | Eindhoven | North Brabant | Sportpark Aalsterweg |
| Pinoké | Amstelveen | North Holland | Amsterdamse Bos |
| Rotterdam | Rotterdam | South Holland | Hazelaarweg Stadion |
| Schaerweijde | Zeist | Utrecht | Sportpark Krakelingsweg |

=== Number of teams by province ===
| Province | Number of teams | Teams |
|---|---|---|
| North Holland | 5 | Amsterdam, Bloemendaal, Hurley, Laren, and Pinoké |
| South Holland | 3 | HDM, Klein Zwitserland, and Rotterdam |
| Utrecht | 2 | Kampong and Schaerweijde |
| North Brabant | 2 | Den Bosch and Oranje-Rood |
| Total | 12 | |

== Regular season ==
=== Standings ===
| Pos | Team | Pld | W | D | L | GF | GA | GD | Pts | Qualification or relegation |
|---|---|---|---|---|---|---|---|---|---|---|
| 1 | Oranje-Rood | 22 | 17 | 5 | 0 | 73 | 29 | +44 | 56 | Qualification Euro Hockey League Round 1 and play-offs |
| 2 | Rotterdam (C) | 22 | 15 | 2 | 5 | 88 | 38 | +50 | 47 | Qualification Euro Hockey League quarter-finals and play-offs |
| 3 | Pinoké | 22 | 13 | 6 | 3 | 77 | 46 | +31 | 45 | Qualification play-offs |
| 4 | Amsterdam | 22 | 13 | 5 | 4 | 68 | 42 | +26 | 44 | Qualification Euro Hockey League Final 12 and play-offs |
| 5 | Den Bosch | 22 | 12 | 4 | 6 | 84 | 48 | +36 | 40 | |
| 6 | Bloemendaal | 22 | 11 | 5 | 6 | 59 | 41 | +18 | 38 | |
| 7 | Kampong | 22 | 10 | 3 | 9 | 61 | 52 | +9 | 33 | |
| 8 | Klein Zwitserland | 22 | 7 | 6 | 9 | 41 | 45 | −4 | 27 | |
| 9 | Schaerweijde | 22 | 4 | 4 | 14 | 30 | 78 | −48 | 16 | |
| 10 | HDM (O) | 22 | 4 | 3 | 15 | 35 | 72 | −37 | 15 | Qualification relegation play-offs |
| 11 | Laren (R) | 22 | 1 | 3 | 18 | 36 | 96 | −60 | 6 | Qualification relegation play-offs |
| 12 | Hurley (R) | 22 | 1 | 2 | 19 | 19 | 84 | −65 | 5 | Relegation to Promotieklasse |

Source: Flashscore
Rules for classification: 1) points; 2) matches won; 3) goal difference; 4) goals for; 5) head-to-head result.
(C) Champions; (O) Play-off winners; (R) Relegated

=== Results ===
| Home \ Away | AMS | BLO | DB | HDM | HUR | KAM | KZ | LAR | OR | PIN | ROT | SCH |
|---|---|---|---|---|---|---|---|---|---|---|---|---|
| Amsterdam | — | 2–2 | 8–6 | 4–1 | 5–1 | 2–0 | 3–1 | 9–0 | 3–3 | 1–0 | 0–3 | 4–2 |
| Bloemendaal | 5–3 | — | 2–3 | 5–0 | 1–0 | 5–4 | 1–0 | 5–3 | 3–4 | 3–3 | 1–2 | 4–0 |
| Den Bosch | 1–2 | 1–1 | — | 3–3 | 5–1 | 4–1 | 2–2 | 4–2 | 1–2 | 6–3 | 1–3 | 9–0 |
| HDM | 1–2 | 0–2 | 0–4 | — | 1–2 | 3–6 | 2–2 | 3–2 | 2–7 | 2–3 | 2–3 | 1–1 |
| Hurley | 0–3 | 0–5 | 1–3 | 0–4 | — | 1–4 | 1–2 | 3–3 | 0–1 | 1–8 | 0–6 | 2–3 |
| Kampong | 2–2 | 3–5 | 6–5 | 6–1 | 2–1 | — | 1–3 | 7–0 | 2–4 | 0–3 | 3–2 | 3–0 |
| Klein Zwitserland | 4–3 | 0–2 | 2–4 | 1–0 | 4–1 | 0–0 | — | 4–1 | 1–1 | 2–4 | 0–5 | 7–1 |
| Laren | 1–3 | 3–2 | 0–6 | 2–3 | 2–2 | 0–2 | 2–2 | — | 0–3 | 3–5 | 1–7 | 1–3 |
| Oranje-Rood | 4–4 | 4–1 | 2–1 | 5–2 | 6–1 | 2–1 | 1–0 | 5–2 | — | 2–2 | 0–0 | 2–0 |
| Pinoké | 2–1 | 1–1 | 3–3 | 4–0 | 5–0 | 3–3 | 2–1 | 8–3 | 1–6 | — | 2–2 | 4–1 |
| Rotterdam | 2–3 | 4–2 | 3–4 | 7–2 | 9–0 | 3–1 | 7–2 | 6–2 | 1–4 | 4–5 | — | 5–1 |
| Schaerweijde | 1–1 | 1–1 | 1–8 | 1–2 | 2–1 | 3–4 | 1–1 | 4–3 | 1–5 | 1–6 | 2–4 | — |

Updated to match(es) played on 9 May 2026. Source: Flashscore
Legend: Blue = home team win; Yellow = draw; Red = away team win.

=== Top goalscorers ===
| Rank | Player | Club | FG | PC | PS | Goals |
|---|---|---|---|---|---|---|
| 1 | (Netherlands) Timo Boers | Den Bosch | 0 | 25 | 6 | 31 |
| 2 | (Scotland) Struan Walker | Oranje-Rood | 15 | 11 | 0 | 26 |
| 3 | (Netherlands) Joep Troost | Pinoké | 6 | 16 | 1 | 23 |
| 4 | (Netherlands) Boris Burkhardt | Amsterdam | 8 | 11 | 3 | 22 |
| 5 | (Netherlands) Pepijn van der Heijden | Rotterdam | 0 | 15 | 3 | 18 |
| 6 | (Netherlands) Miles Bukkens | Pinoké | 7 | 8 | 1 | 16 |
| 7 | (Netherlands) Teun Beins | Bloemendaal | 0 | 15 | 0 | 15 |
| 7 | (Netherlands) Duco Telgenkamp | Kampong | 15 | 0 | 0 | 15 |
| 9 | (South Africa) Mustapha Cassiem | Amsterdam | 9 | 4 | 0 | 13 |
| 9 | (Netherlands) Koen Bijen | Den Bosch | 12 | 1 | 0 | 13 |
| 9 | (Netherlands) Thierry Brinkman | Den Bosch | 12 | 1 | 0 | 13 |
| 9 | (Belgium) Florent Van Aubel | Pinoké | 11 | 2 | 0 | 13 |
| 9 | (Netherlands) Timme van der Heijden | Rotterdam | 12 | 1 | 0 | 13 |

Updated to 9 May 2026. Source: KNHB

== Play-offs ==
=== Bracket ===
Semi-finals
14 & 17 May
Oranje-Rood | 2 | 1 | 3
Amsterdam | 2 | 4 | 6
14 & 17 May
Rotterdam | 2 | 4 | 6
Pinoké | 1 | 3 | 4

Final
23 & 25 May
Amsterdam | 2 | 2 | 4
Rotterdam | 3 | 2 | 5

=== Semi-finals ===
14 May 2026
18:30

| Amsterdam | 2–2 | Oranje-Rood |
|---|---|---|
| M. Cassiem 4', 13' | Report | Reyenga 11'; Mertgens 27' |

Wagener Stadium, Amstelveen

17 May 2026
17:00

| Oranje-Rood | 1–4 | Amsterdam |
|---|---|---|
| Galema 59' | Report | D. Cassiem 39'; Burkhardt 41'; M. Cassiem 43', 57' |

Sportpark Aalsterweg, Eindhoven

Amsterdam won 6–3 on aggregate.

14 May 2026
12:00

| Pinoké | 1–2 | Rotterdam |
|---|---|---|
| Van Aubel 32' | Report | Recasens 4'; Hortensius 41' |

Amsterdamse Bos, Amstelveen

17 May 2026
15:00

| Rotterdam | 4–3 | Pinoké |
|---|---|---|
| Hoedemakers 17', 21'; P. van der Heijden 52', 60' | Report | Bukkens 19'; Aerts 28'; Van Aubel 54' |

Hazelaarweg Stadion, Rotterdam

Rotterdam won 6–4 on aggregate.

=== Final ===
23 May 2026
16:00

| Amsterdam | 2–3 | Rotterdam |
|---|---|---|
| M. Cassiem 13'; Van Bijnen 23' | Report | Hoedemakers 4'; P. van der Heijden 11'; T. van der Heijden 18' |

Wagener Stadium, Amstelveen

25 May 2026
16:00

| Rotterdam | 2–2 | Amsterdam |
|---|---|---|
| Van Dam 26'; Menini 59' | Report | Steins Bisschop 8'; Burkhardt 43' |

Hazelaarweg Stadion, Rotterdam

Rotterdam won 5–4 on aggregate to win their second title.

== Relegation play-offs ==
=== Overview ===
| Team 1 | Agg. | Team 2 | 1st leg | 2nd leg |
|---|---|---|---|---|
| HDM | 5–2 | Nijmegen | 2–1 | 3–1 |
| Laren | 4–5 | Tilburg | 3–4 | 1–1 |

=== Matches ===
30 May 2026
16:00

| HDM | 2–1 | Nijmegen |
|---|---|---|
| Taberima 7'; Verzuu 57' | Report | Blom 17' |

Sportcomplex Groenendaal, The Hague

31 May 2026
16:00

| Nijmegen | 1–3 | HDM |
|---|---|---|
| Stuve 50' | Report | Verzuu 20'; Van den Boezem 46'; Taberima 57' |

Sportpark d'Almarasweg, Nijmegen

HDM won 5–2 on aggregate, and therefore both teams remained in their respective leagues.

30 May 2026
16:00

| Laren | 3–4 | Tilburg |
|---|---|---|
| Moojen 18'; Van Langeveld 34'; Selles 53' | Report | Haring 11', 55'; Wesselius 18'; Popelier 59' |

Sportpark Eemnesserweg, Laren

31 May 2026
16:00

| Tilburg | 1–1 | Laren |
|---|---|---|
| Haring 49' | Report | Reyenga 24' |

Sportpark Bredaseweg, Tilburg

Tilburg won 5–4 on aggregate and were promoted to the Hoofdklasse, while Laren were relegated to the Promotieklasse.

== See also ==
- 2025–26 Women's Hoofdklasse Hockey
