= 2022–23 Men's Hoofdklasse Hockey =

Hoofdklasse
- Season: 2022–23
- Dates: 3 September 2022 – 29 May 2023
- Champions: Pinoké (1st title)
- Relegated: Voordaan
- Euro Hockey League: Bloemendaal; Kampong; Pinoké
- Matches played: 114
- Goals scored: 541 (4.75 per match)
- Best Player: Jonas de Geus
- Top goalscorer: Jeroen Hertzberger (32 goals)
- Biggest home win: Den Bosch 11–1 Voordaan; Amsterdam 10–0 Voordaan
- Biggest away win: Voordaan 0–12 Kampong
- Highest scoring: Voordaan 0–12 Kampong; Den Bosch 11–1 Voordaan

The 2022–23 Men's Hoofdklasse Hockey, also known as the Tulp Hoofdklasse Men for sponsorship reasons, was the 50th season of the Men's Hoofdklasse Hockey, the top Dutch field hockey league. It began on 3 September 2022 and concluded on 29 May 2023 with the second match of the championship final.

Bloemendaal were the three-time defending champions. They lost 5–1 on aggregate in the championship final to Pinoké who won their first national title.

== Changes from 2021–22 ==
Starting from this season all the matches in the Hoofdklasse were played in four quarters of 15 minutes in accordance with the international rules of hockey; previously, the quarters were 17.5 minutes. Originally, the championship final would be played over one match at the Wagener Stadium in Amstelveen instead of the best of three home and away series as the previous seasons. The semi-finals of the play-offs would remain a best of three series. After consultation with the Hoofdklasse clubs, it was decided to play both the semi-final and final rounds in two games: one home and one away.

== Teams ==
2022–23 Men's Hoofdklasse teams

Twelve teams competed in the league - the top nine teams from the previous season, the winner of the 2021–22 Promotieklasse and the two winners of the 2021–22 relegation play-offs. Schaerweijde won the 2021–22 Promotieklasse and replaced Hurley, while HDM and Voordaan were promoted after beating SCHC and Tilburg in the relegation play-offs.

=== Accommodation and locations ===
Team	Location	Province	Accommodation
Amsterdam	Amstelveen	North Holland	Wagener Stadium
Bloemendaal	Bloemendaal	North Holland	Sportpark 't Kopje
Den Bosch	's-Hertogenbosch	North Brabant	Sportpark Oosterplas
HDM	The Hague	South Holland	Sportpark Duinzigt
HGC	Wassenaar	South Holland	De Roggewoning
Kampong	Utrecht	Utrecht	De Klapperboom
Klein Zwitserland	The Hague	South Holland	Sportpark Klein Zwitserland
Oranje-Rood	Eindhoven	North Brabant	Sportpark Aalsterweg
Pinoké	Amstelveen	North Holland	Amsterdamse Bos
Rotterdam	Rotterdam	South Holland	Hazelaarweg Stadion
Schaerweijde	Zeist	Utrecht	Sportpark Krakelingweg
Voordaan	Groenekan	Utrecht	Sportpark Bos

=== Number of teams by province ===
Province	Number of teams	Teams
South Holland	4	HDM, HGC, Klein Zwitserland and Rotterdam
North Holland	3	Amsterdam, Bloemendaal and Pinoké
Utrecht	3	Kampong, Schaerweijde and Voordaan
North Brabant	2	Den Bosch and Oranje-Rood
Total	12	

== Regular season ==
=== Standings ===
Pos	Team	Pld	W	D	L	GF	GA	GD	Pts	Qualification or relegation
1	Kampong	22	17	2	3	73	35	+38	53	Qualification for the Euro Hockey League and the play-offs
2	Bloemendaal	22	14	7	1	69	30	+39	49	Qualification for the Euro Hockey League and the play-offs
3	Rotterdam	22	13	2	7	76	50	+26	41	Qualification for the play-offs
4	Pinoké (C)	22	11	5	6	58	42	+16	38	Qualification for the Euro Hockey League and the play-offs
5	Oranje-Rood	22	10	8	4	56	35	+21	38	
6	Den Bosch	22	10	5	7	68	53	+15	35	
7	Amsterdam	22	9	4	9	61	44	+17	31	
8	Klein Zwitserland	22	8	7	7	56	47	+9	31	
9	HGC	22	6	5	11	45	49	−4	23	
10	HDM (O)	22	5	4	13	35	67	−32	19	Qualification for the relegation play-offs
11	Schaerweijde (O)	22	2	4	16	24	59	−35	10	Qualification for the relegation play-offs
12	Voordaan (R)	22	0	1	21	23	133	−110	1	Relegation to the Promotieklasse

Source: Flashscore
Rules for classification: 1) points; 2) matches won; 3) goal difference; 4) goals for; 5) head-to-head result.
(C) Champions; (O) Play-off winners; (R) Relegated

=== Results ===
Home \ Away	AMS	BLO	DB	HDM	HGC	KAM	KZ	OR	PIN	ROT	SCH	VOO
Amsterdam	—	1–4	2–4	7–1	3–3	0–1	1–1	1–1	4–3	1–6	3–1	10–0
Bloemendaal	3–0	—	3–3	3–1	4–2	0–0	2–1	3–0	2–2	4–1	3–0	3–1
Den Bosch	3–2	2–2	—	4–3	2–3	4–5	1–1	2–2	4–3	4–5	1–0	11–1
HDM	2–2	0–4	3–1	—	1–3	1–7	3–2	1–2	0–1	1–3	2–1	5–2
HGC	0–1	2–2	2–4	1–1	—	2–4	0–2	1–1	3–4	1–3	3–0	5–0
Kampong	2–1	1–3	2–1	3–0	2–1	—	4–4	3–2	2–1	4–3	2–0	6–1
Klein Zwitserland	2–4	5–3	3–4	1–1	4–2	0–2	—	2–1	2–2	1–3	3–1	4–0
Oranje-Rood	2–1	2–2	2–2	4–1	5–1	4–3	4–4	—	2–2	3–1	3–0	6–1
Pinoké	2–1	1–4	4–3	3–0	2–0	3–4	2–2	2–1	—	0–1	3–1	6–1
Rotterdam	2–6	0–5	5–3	8–1	3–3	2–3	3–2	0–1	1–1	—	6–1	10–1
Schaerweijde	1–3	3–3	0–1	1–1	1–2	2–1	1–5	2–2	1–4	3–6	—	3–1
Voordaan	0–7	2–7	0–4	4–6	0–5	0–12	3–5	0–6	3–7	1–4	1–1	—

Source: Flashscore
Legend: Blue = home team win; Yellow = draw; Red = away team win.

=== Top goalscorers ===
Rank	Player	Club	FG	PC	PS	Goals
1	(Netherlands) Jeroen Hertzberger	Rotterdam	14	17	5	36
1	(Netherlands) Jip Janssen	Kampong	0	32	2	34
3	(United States) Aki Käppeler	Klein Zwitserland	0	23	1	24
4	(Belgium) Alexander Hendrickx	Pinoké	0	21	1	22
5	(Australia) Jeremy Hayward	Den Bosch	1	15	3	19
6	(Netherlands) Boris Burkhardt	Amsterdam	7	10	0	17
7	(New Zealand) Sam Lane	Oranje-Rood	7	8	1	16
8	(Netherlands) Duco Telgenkamp	Kampong	14	1	0	15
8	(Netherlands) Koen Bijen	Den Bosch	13	1	0	15
8	(Netherlands) Tim Swaen	Bloemendaal	0	13	2	15

== Play-offs ==
=== Bracket ===
Semi-finals
Bloemendaal	2	4	6
Rotterdam	1	3	4
Kampong	1	1	2
Pinoké	3	2	5

Final
Bloemendaal	1	0	1
Pinoké	1	4	5

=== Semi-finals ===
18 May 2023
18:00

Rotterdam	1–2	Bloemendaal
Menini 59'	Report	Van Doren 19'; Warmerdam 44'

Hazelaarweg Stadion, Rotterdam

21 May 2023
16:30

Bloemendaal	4–3	Rotterdam
Swaen 13'; Van Doren 25', 35'; Bovendeert 55'	Report	Van der Heijden 17'; Hertzberger 20', 53'

Sportpark 't Kopje, Bloemendaal

Bloemendaal won 6–4 on aggregate.

18 May 2023
16:00

Pinoké	3–1	Kampong
Hendrickx 16'; M. Bukkens 23'; Landbrug 28'	Report	Janssen 21'

Amsterdamse Bos, Amstelveen

21 May 2023
14:30

Kampong	1–2	Pinoké
Janssen 8'	Report	Dockier 1'; Van Aubel 9'

De Klapperboom, Utrecht

Pinoké won 5–2 on aggregate.

=== Final ===
27 May 2023
16:00

Pinoké	1–1	Bloemendaal
Hendrickx 50'	Report	Van Doren 55'

Amsterdamse Bos, Amstelveen

29 May 2023
16:00

Bloemendaal	0–4	Pinoké
	Report	Landbrug 31', 51'; Hendrickx 50'; De Vilder 54'

Sportpark 't Kopje, Bloemendaal

Pinoké won 5–1 on aggregate.

== Relegation play-offs ==
The relegation play-offs were held on 24, 27 and 29 May 2023.

=== Overview ===
Team 1	Series	Team 2	Game 1	Game 2	Game 3
Hurley	0–2	HDM	1–2	2–4	
Nijmegen	1–2	Schaerweijde	3–3 (2–1 s.o.)	2–4	2–3
