= Timur Oruz =

German field hockey player

- Oruz in 2016

Personal information
- Born: 27 October 1994 (age 32) Krefeld, Germany
- Height: 1.87 m (6 ft 2 in)
- Weight: 88 kg (194 lb)

Sport
- Sport: Field hockey
- Position: Midfielder / Forward
- Club: Rot-Weiss Köln
Youth career
- Years: Team
- –2012: Crefelder HTC
Senior career
Years	Team	Caps	Goals
2012–2013	Crefelder HTC	-	-
2013–2014	Uhlenhorst Mülheim	-	-
2014–2015	Crefelder HTC	-	-
2015–present	Rot-Weiss Köln	-	-
National team
Years	Team	Caps	Goals
2014–2023	Germany	115	(29)
Medal record
Men's field hockey
Representing Germany
Olympic Games
Bronze medal – third place	2016 Rio de Janeiro	Team
World Cup
Gold medal – first place	2023 Bhubaneswar/Rourkela
EuroHockey Championship
Silver medal – second place	2021 Amstelveen
Champions Trophy
Gold medal – first place	2014 Bhubaneswar
Junior World Cup
Gold medal – first place	2013 New Delhi
EuroHockey Junior Championship
Silver medal – second place	2014 Waterloo

Timur Oruz (born 27 October 1994) is a German field hockey player who plays as a midfielder or forward for Bundesliga club Rot-Weiss Köln. He played a total of 115 matches for the German national team from 2014 until 2023.

== International career ==
Oruz represented his country at the 2016 Summer Olympics, where he won the bronze medal. On 28 May 2021, he was named in the squads for the 2021 EuroHockey Championship and the 2020 Summer Olympics. In February 2024 he announced his retirement from the national team.

== Club career ==
Oruz started playing hockey at Crefelder HTC. In 2013 he left Crefelder HTC for Uhlenhorst Mülheim. After one season he returned to his club in Krefeld and in 2015 he moved to his current club Rot-Weiss Köln. He won his first Bundesliga title directly in his first season in 2016.

== Personal life ==
Oruz was diagnosed with type 1 diabetes at the age of six His sister Selin Oruz is also a field hockey player for the national team.

== Honours ==
=== Club ===
Rot-Weiss Köln

- Bundesliga: 2015–16, 2019–2021, 2021–22, 2022–23
- Euro Hockey League: 2016–17

=== National team ===
Germany U21

- Junior World Cup: 2013

Germany

- Olympic bronze medal: 2016
- FIH Hockey World Cup: 2023
- Champions Trophy: 2014
