= Florent Van Aubel =

Belgian field hockey player

Personal information
- Born: 25 October 1991 (age 34) Ghent, Belgium
- Height: 178 cm (5 ft 10 in)
- Weight: 73 kg (161 lb)

Sport
- Sport: Field hockey
- Position: Forward
- Club: Pinoké
Youth career
- Years: Team
- 1995–2003: Indiana
- 2003–2006: Orée
Senior career
Years	Team	Caps	Goals
2006–2009	Orée	-	-
2009–2022	Dragons	-	-
2022–present	Pinoké	-	-
National team
Years	Team	Caps	Goals
2012–2024	Belgium	301	(119)
Medal record
Men's field hockey
Representing Belgium
Olympic Games
Gold medal – first place	2020 Tokyo	Team
Silver medal – second place	2016 Rio de Janeiro	Team
World Cup
Gold medal – first place	2018 Bhubaneswar
Silver medal – second place	2023 Bhubaneswar–Rourkela
EuroHockey Championship
Gold medal – first place	2019 Antwerp
Silver medal – second place	2013 Boom
Silver medal – second place	2017 Amstelveen
Bronze medal – third place	2021 Amstelveen
Bronze medal – third place	2023 Mönchengladbach
Hockey World League
Silver medal – second place	2014–15 Raipur	Team
EuroHockey Junior Championship
Silver medal – second place	2010 Siemianowice Śląskie

Florent Van Aubel (born 25 October 1991) is a Belgian professional field hockey player who plays as a forward for Dutch Hoofdklasse club Pinoké. He played 301 matches for the Belgian national team from 2012 until 2024.

== Club career ==
In 2010, he won the Golden Stick from the Belgian Hockey Association in the category of male junior players. In 2011 he was nominated by the International Hockey Federation (FIH) for best young player of the year. Also, Florent van Aubel participated with his club KHC Dragons at the Euro Hockey League. In 2012, he also played at the Euro Hockey League and finished third. After 13 years at Dragons he left Belgium in 2022 to play for Pinoké in the Dutch Hoofdklasse. In his first season at Pinoké, he won the national title which was the first league title for Pinoké.

== International career ==
At the 2012 Summer Olympics, he competed for the national team in the men's tournament where Belgium ended fifth. Van Aubel became European vice-champion with Belgium at the 2013 European Championship on home ground in Boom. After winning the silver medal at the Rio Olympics, he became World Champion at Bhubaneswar. In 2019, he was a part of the squad which won Belgium its first European title. On 25 May 2021, he was selected in the squad for the 2021 EuroHockey Championship. In July 2024 he announced that the 2024 Summer Olympics would be his last tournament with the national team.

== Honours ==
=== International ===
Belgium

- Olympic gold medal: 2020
- Olympic silver medal: 2016
- World Cup: 2018
- EuroHockey Championship: 2019
- FIH Pro League: 2020–21

=== Club ===
Dragons

- Belgian Hockey League: 2009–10, 2010–11, 2014–15, 2015–16, 2016–17, 2017–18, 2020–21

Pinoké

- Hoofdklasse: 2022–23
- Euro Hockey League: 2023–24
