= 2018–19 Men's Hoofdklasse Hockey =

Hoofdklasse
- Season: 2018–19
- Dates: 26 August 2018 – 26 May 2019
- Champions: Bloemendaal (20th title)
- Premiers: Bloemendaal
- Relegated: SCHC
- Euro Hockey League: Bloemendaal; Kampong; HGC
- Matches: 132
- Goals: 576 (4.36 per match)
- Top goalscorer: Jeroen Hertzberger (23 goals)
- Biggest home win: Kampong 6–0 Tilburg
- Biggest away win: Amsterdam 2–8 HGC
- Highest scoring: HGC 8–3 Almere

The 2018–19 Hoofdklasse was the 46th season of the Hoofdklasse, the Netherlands' highest field hockey league. It began on 26 August 2019 and it will conclude with the third match of the championship final on 26 May 2019.

Kampong were the defending champions, having won the 2017–18 season by defeating Amsterdam in the championship final. Bloemendaal won their 20th title by defeating Kampong 2–1 over three matches in the championship final.

== Teams ==
2018–19 Men's Hoofdklasse teams

A total of 12 teams took part in the league: The best nine teams from the 2017–18 season, the two promotion/relegation play-off winners (Pinoké and Almere) and the 2017–18 Overgangsklasse winners (Klein Zwitserland), who replaced HDM.

Team	Location	Province	Accommodation
Almere	Almere	Flevoland	Sportpark Klein Brandt
Amsterdam	Amstelveen	North Holland	Wagener Stadium
Bloemendaal	Bloemendaal	North Holland	Sportpark 't Kopje
Den Bosch	's-Hertogenbosch	North Brabant	Sportpark Oosterplas
HGC	Wassenaar	South Holland	De Roggewoning
Kampong	Utrecht	Utrecht	De Klapperboom
Klein Zwitserland	The Hague	South Holland	Sportpark Klein Zwitserland
Oranje-Rood	Eindhoven	North Brabant	Sportpark Aalsterweg
Pinoké	Amstelveen	North Holland	Amsterdamse Bos
Rotterdam	Rotterdam	South Holland	Hazelaarweg Stadion
SCHC	Bilthoven	Utrecht	Sportpark Kees Broekelaan
Tilburg	Tilburg	North Brabant	Sportpark Oude Warande

=== Number of teams by province ===
Province	Number of teams	Teams
North Brabant	3	Den Bosch, Oranje-Rood and Tilburg
North Holland	3	Amsterdam, Bloemendaal and Pinoké
South Holland	3	HGC, Klein Zwitserland and Rotterdam
Utrecht	2	Kampong and SCHC
Flevoland	1	Almere
Total	12	

== Regular season ==
=== League table ===
Pos	Team	Pld	W	D	L	GF	GA	GD	Pts	Qualification or relegation
1	Bloemendaal (C)	22	16	3	3	62	24	+38	51	Qualification for the Euro Hockey League and the play-offs
2	Kampong	22	16	3	3	62	30	+32	51	Qualification for the Euro Hockey League and the play-offs
3	HGC	22	12	4	6	78	51	+27	40	Qualification for the Euro Hockey League and the play-offs
4	Amsterdam	22	12	4	6	58	40	+18	40	Qualification for the play-offs
5	Oranje-Rood	22	11	5	6	53	46	+7	38	
6	Den Bosch	22	10	7	5	47	33	+14	37	
7	Rotterdam	22	10	5	7	59	51	+8	35	
8	Pinoké	22	4	9	9	36	46	−10	21	
9	Almere	22	5	3	14	34	62	−28	18	
10	Tilburg (O)	22	2	8	12	26	63	−37	14	Qualification for the relegation play-offs
11	Klein Zwitserland (O)	22	3	4	15	26	55	−29	13	Qualification for the relegation play-offs
12	SCHC (R)	22	2	3	17	35	75	−40	9	Relegation to the Promotieklasse

Source: TheSports.org
(C) Champions; (O) Play-off winners; (R) Relegated

=== Results ===
Home \ Away	ALM	AMS	BLO	DB	HGC	KAM	KZ	OR	PIN	ROT	SCH	TIL
Almere	—	1–3	1–2	1–4	0–4	1–4	2–1	2–1	3–3	2–2	3–1	1–1
Amsterdam	4–1	—	2–2	3–0	2–8	0–2	5–1	2–0	3–2	2–2	3–1	7–1
Bloemendaal	2–1	4–2	—	2–1	2–1	1–2	3–1	5–0	2–0	3–1	5–0	6–1
Den Bosch	0–1	2–1	1–4	—	3–0	1–1	3–0	2–2	1–1	3–0	5–0	3–1
HGC	8–3	0–2	1–4	4–4	—	1–4	5–2	4–5	2–2	2–2	6–1	4–0
Kampong	1–2	1–1	1–2	3–1	3–3	—	1–0	1–0	4–1	1–2	4–3	6–0
Klein Zwitserland	3–1	1–2	0–4	1–3	1–2	4–5	—	1–1	2–2	2–5	3–2	0–0
Oranje-Rood	3–1	4–3	0–0	2–2	3–5	1–3	4–1	—	3–2	4–4	3–2	4–0
Pinoké	3–1	2–2	2–2	1–1	2–4	1–3	0–1	1–3	—	1–3	1–0	2–1
Rotterdam	6–3	2–1	3–1	2–3	2–6	2–3	2–0	3–4	1–3	—	4–2	2–2
SCHC	2–0	2–4	1–6	2–3	3–5	2–7	2–0	1–2	2–2	2–5	—	2–2
Tilburg	4–3	1–4	2–0	1–1	1–3	1–2	1–1	1–4	2–2	1–4	2–2	—

Source: Flashscore
Legend: Blue = home team win; Yellow = draw; Red = away team win.

== Play-offs ==
All rounds are played in a best of three format, with the higher seeded team playing the second and third game at home.

=== Bracket ===
Semi-finals
Bloemendaal	2	1 (4)
Amsterdam	0	1 (2)
Kampong	5	3
HGC	2	2

Final
Bloemendaal	2	1	2
Kampong	1	2	0
EHL play-off
HGC	2	5 (3)	2 (7)
Amsterdam	3	5 (2)	2 (6)

=== Semi-finals ===
The semi-finals were played from 15 to 19 May 2019.

==== (1) Bloemendaal vs (4) Amsterdam ====
15 May 2019
20:30

Amsterdam	0–2	Bloemendaal
		J. Brinkman 62'; Swaen 69'

Wagener Stadium, Amstelveen

18 May 2019
16:00

Bloemendaal	1–1	Amsterdam
Fuchs 59'		Buissant 34'
Penalties
	4–2

Sportpark 't Kopje, Bloemendaal

Bloemendaal won series 2–0.

==== (2) Kampong vs. (3) HGC ====
15 May 2019
20:30

HGC	2–5	Kampong
Plennevaux 22'; Van Tongeren 53'		Meulenbroek 17', 42', 46', 56'; Kellerman 36'

De Roggewoning, Wassenaar

18 May 2019
16:00

Kampong	3–2	HGC
De Vilder 42'; Janssen 48'; Kellerman 65'		Jackson 41', 44'

De Klapperboom, Utrecht

Kampong won series 2–0.

=== EHL play-off ===
Because the regular season champions, Bloemendaal, also qualified for the final, an extra series was needed to determine the third Dutch qualifier for the 2019–20 Euro Hockey League.

22 May 2019
20:30

Amsterdam	3–2	HGC
Verga 16'; Pruyser 23'; Reid-Ross 28'		Jackson 17'; Cosyns 62'

Wagener Stadium, Amstelveen

25 May 2019
16:00

HGC	5–5	Amsterdam
Jackson 10'; Schoenaker 26'; Van Ass 33'; Cosyns 63'; Van der Linden 69'		Reid-Ross 17', 31', 44'; Burkhardt 21'; Leijs 64'
Penalties
	3–2

De Roggewoning, Wassenaar

26 May 2019
16:00

HGC	2–2	Amsterdam
Van Ass 48'; Cosyns 55'		Reid-Ross 32'; Pruyser 41'
Penalties
	7–6

De Roggewoning, Wassenaar

HGC won series 2–1.

=== Final ===
22 May 2019
20:30

Kampong	1–2	Bloemendaal
Meulenbroek 67'		Croon 6'; T. Brinkman 69'

De Klapperboom, Utrecht

25 May 2019
16:00

Bloemendaal	1–2	Kampong
Van der Drift 2'		Phijffer 26'; Janssen 52'

Sportpark 't Kopje, Bloemendaal

26 May 2019
16:00

Bloemendaal	2–0	Kampong
Croon 29'; Fuchs 44'

Sportpark 't Kopje, Bloemendaal

Bloemendaal won series 2–1.

=== Relegation play-offs ===
Team 1	Series	Team 2	Game 1	Game 2	Game 3
HDM	0–2	Klein Zwitserland	1–2	0–2	
Cartouche	1–2	Tilburg	1–2	3–3 (3–2 s.o.)	1–2

== Statistics ==
=== Top goalscorers ===
As of 12 May 2019

Rank	Player	Club	Goals
1	(Netherlands) Jeroen Hertzberger	Rotterdam	23
2	(England) Ashley Jackson	HGC	17
2	(South Africa) Justin Reid-Ross	Amsterdam	17
4	(Belgium) Alex Hendrickx	Pinoké	15
5	(Netherlands) Mirco Pruyser	Amsterdam	14
5	(Netherlands) Mink van der Weerden	Oranje-Rood	14
7	(Argentina) Nicolás Della Torre	Den Bosch	13
8	(Netherlands) Bjorn Kellerman	Kampong	12
8	(Netherlands) Tim Swaen	Bloemendaal	12
8	(Netherlands) Jelle Galema	Den Bosch	12
