= Sébastien Dockier =

Belgian field hockey player

Personal information
- Born: 28 December 1989 (age 36) Bonheiden, Belgium
- Height: 1.75 m (5 ft 9 in)
- Weight: 74 kg (163 lb)

Sport
- Sport: Field hockey
- Position: Forward
- Club: Pinoké
Youth career
- Team
- –: Beerschot
Senior career
Years	Team	Caps	Goals
–2014	Beerschot	-	-
2014–2017	Den Bosch	-	-
2017–2018	Beerschot	-	-
2018–2020	Den Bosch	-	-
2020–2025	Pinoké	-	-
2025–	Braxgata	-	-
National team
Years	Team	Caps	Goals
2012–2023	Belgium	243	(135)
Medal record
Men's field hockey
Representing Belgium
Olympic Games
Gold medal – first place	2020 Tokyo	Team
Silver medal – second place	2016 Rio de Janeiro	Team
World Cup
Gold medal – first place	2018 Bhubaneswar
Silver medal – second place	2023 Bhubaneswar–Rourkela
European Championships
Silver medal – second place	2013 Boom
Silver medal – second place	2017 Amstelveen
Bronze medal – third place	2021 Amstelveen
Hockey World League
Silver medal – second place	2014–15 Raipur	Team
- Updated on 27 September 2023

Sébastien Dockier (born 28 December 1989) is a Belgian field hockey player who plays as a forward for Braxgata.

Dockier belongs to a hockey family; his father and sister, aunts and cousins have been playing field hockey.

== Club career ==
During his youth, he played for Royal Beerschot THC, where he played in the first team until 2014, when he left to play for Dutch club HC Den Bosch. After three seasons with Den Bosch, he went back to his former club. He played there for one season before returning to the Netherlands to play for Den Bosch again. In June 2020, he left Den Bosch and joined Pinoké for the 2020–21 season. In his third season at Pinoké, he won the national title which was the first league title for Pinoké.

== International career ==
He became European vice-champion with Belgium at the 2013 EuroHockey Championships on home ground in Boom and at the 2017 EuroHockey Championships in Amstelveen, Netherlands. He was a part of the Belgian squad which won the silver medal at the 2016 Summer Olympics. He was selected for the 2018 World Cup, which was his second World Cup. On 25 May 2021, he was selected in the squad for the 2021 EuroHockey Championship. During the start of the 2023–24 season, he was dropped from the national training squad for the 2024 Summer Olympics.

== Honours ==
=== International ===
Belgium

- Olympic gold medal: 2020; silver medal: 2016
- World Cup: 2018
- FIH Pro League: 2020–21

=== Club ===
Pinoké

- Hoofdklasse: 2022–23
- Euro Hockey League: 2023–24
