= Field hockey at the 2020 Summer Olympics – Men's tournament =

Men's field hockey at the 2020 Summer Olympics

Tournament details
- Host country: Japan
- City: Tokyo
- Dates: 24 July – 5 August 2021
- Teams: 12 (from 5 confederations)
- Venue: Oi Hockey Stadium

Final positions
- Champions: Belgium (1st title)
- Runner-up: Australia
- Third place: India

Tournament statistics
- Matches played: 38
- Goals scored: 209 (5.5 per match)
- Top scorer: (Belgium) Alexander Hendrickx (14 goals)

The men's field hockey tournament at the 2020 Summer Olympics was the 24th edition of the field hockey event for men at the Summer Olympic Games. It was held from 24 July to 5 August 2021. All games were played at the Oi Hockey Stadium in Tokyo, Japan.

It was originally scheduled to be held from 25 July to 6 August 2020, but on 24 March 2020, the Olympics were postponed to 2021 due to the COVID-19 pandemic. Because of this pandemic, the games were played behind closed doors.

Argentina won the previous olympic field hockey event but were eliminated in the quarterfinals. Belgium captured their first gold medal after defeating Australia in the final after penalties. India won their first hockey medal since 1980 Summer Olympics by defeating Germany in the bronze-medal match.

The medals for the competition were presented by Baron Pierre-Oliver Bekcers-Vieujant, Belgium; IOC Member, and the medalists' bouquets were presented by Narinder Dhruv Batra, the FIH President.

== Competition schedule ==
Legend
G	Group stage	¼	Quarter-finals	½	Semi-finals	B	Bronze medal match	F	Gold medal match

Sat 24	Sun 25	Mon 26	Tue 27	Wed 28	Thu 29	Fri 30	Sat 31	Sun 1	Mon 2	Tue 3	Wed 4	Thu 5	
G	G	G	G	G	G	G		¼		½		B	F

== Competition format ==
The twelve teams in the tournament were divided into two groups of six, with each team initially playing round-robin games within their group. Following the completion of the round-robin stage, the top four teams from each group advanced to the quarter-finals. The two semi-final winners met for the gold medal match, while the semi-final losers played in the bronze medal match.

== Qualification ==
Each of the Continental Champions from five confederations received an automatic berth. Japan as the host nation qualified automatically. The other teams qualified through the 2019 Men's FIH Olympic Qualifiers.

Event	Dates	Location(s)	Quota	Qualifier(s)
Host nation	—N/a	—N/a	1	Japan
2018 Asian Games	19 August – 1 September 2018	(Indonesia) Jakarta	–	–^{A}
2019 Pan American Games	30 July – 10 August 2019	(Peru) Lima	1	Argentina
2019 African Olympic Qualifier	12 – 18 August 2019	(South Africa) Stellenbosch	1	South Africa
2019 EuroHockey Championship	16 – 24 August 2019	(Belgium) Antwerp	1	Belgium
2019 Oceania Cup	5 – 8 September 2019	(Australia) Rockhampton	1	Australia
2019 FIH Olympic Qualifiers	25 October – 3 November 2019	Various	7	Canada; Germany; Great Britain; India; Netherlands; New Zealand; Spain
Total			12	

^A – Japan qualified both as the hosts and the continental champions, therefore that quota is added to the FIH Olympic Qualifiers rather than going to the runners-up of the tournament.

== Umpires ==
On 11 September 2019, 14 umpires were appointed by the FIH.

- Germán Montes de Oca (ARG)
- Adam Kearns (AUS)
- Jakub Mejzlík (CZE)
- Ben Göntgen (GER)
- Martin Madden (GBR)
- Raghu Prasad (IND)
- Javed Shaikh (IND)
- Coen van Bunge (NED)
- Simon Taylor (NZL)
- David Tomlinson (NZL)
- Marcin Grochal (POL)
- Lim Hong Zhen (SGP)
- Peter Wright (RSA)
- Francisco Vázquez (ESP)

== Group stage ==
The pools were announced on 23 November 2019.

All times are local (UTC+9).

=== Group A ===
Pos	Team	Pld	W	D	L	GF	GA	GD	Pts	Qualification
1	Australia	5	4	1	0	22	9	+13	13	Quarter-finals
2	India	5	4	0	1	15	13	+2	12	Quarter-finals
3	Argentina	5	2	1	2	10	11	−1	7	Quarter-finals
4	Spain	5	1	2	2	9	10	−1	5	Quarter-finals
5	New Zealand	5	1	1	3	11	16	−5	4	
6	Japan (H)	5	0	1	4	10	18	−8	1	

Source: Tokyo 2020 and FIH
Rules for classification: 1) points; 2) matches won; 3) goal difference; 4) goals for; 5) head-to-head result; 6) field goals scored.
(H) Hosts

24 July 2021
09:30
v

Japan	3–5	Australia
Ke. Tanaka 22', 27'; Kirishita 26'	Report	Brand 11'; Craig 14'; Govers 31'; Zalewski 38'; Beale 50'

North Pitch
Umpires:
Jakub Mejzlík (CZE)
Lim Hong-Zhen (SGP)

24 July 2021
10:00
v

New Zealand	2–3	India
Russell 6'; Jenness 43'	Report	Rupinder 10'; Harmanpreet 26', 33'

South Pitch
Umpires:
Martin Madden (SCO)
Coen van Bunge (NED)

24 July 2021
12:15
v

Argentina	1–1	Spain
Mazzilli 23'	Report	Quemada 52'

South Pitch
Umpires:
Simon Taylor (NZL)
David Tomlinson (NZL)

25 July 2021
18:30
v

India	1–7	Australia
Dilpreet 34'	Report	Beale 10'; Hayward 21'; Ogilvie 23'; Beltz 26'; Govers 40', 42'; Brand 51'

North Pitch
Umpires:
Ben Göntgen (GER)
Marcin Grochal (POL)

25 July 2021
19:00
v

Japan	1–2	Argentina
Ke. Tanaka 60'	Report	Tolini 5'; Keenan 19'

South Pitch
Umpires:
Raghu Prasad (IND)
Peter Wright (RSA)

25 July 2021
20:45
v

Spain	3–4	New Zealand
González 26'; Quemada 31'; Boltó 39'	Report	Jenness 14'; Tarrant 27'; Russell 48'; Smith 57'

North Pitch
Umpires:
Lim Hong Zhen (SGP)
Adam Kearns (AUS)

27 July 2021
09:30
v

Argentina	2–5	Australia
Tolini 4'; Casella 55'	Report	Govers 15', 23'; Wickham 21'; Sharp 25'; Hayward 39'

North Pitch
Umpires:
Martin Madden (GBR)
Coen van Bunge (NED)

27 July 2021
10:00
v

India	3–0	Spain
Simranjeet 14'; Rupinder 15', 51'	Report

South Pitch
Umpires:
Jakub Mejzlík (CZE)
Peter Wright (RSA)

27 July 2021
11:45
v

Japan	2–2	New Zealand
Yamasaki 3'; Ke. Tanaka 40'	Report	Wilson 11'; Lane 41'

North Pitch
Umpires:
Ben Göntgen (GER)
Germán Montes de Oca (ARG)

28 July 2021
20:45
v

Japan	1–4	Spain
Zendana 2'	Report	Lleonart 3', 55'; Quemada 23'; Alegre 28'

North Pitch
Umpires:
Lim Hong Zhen (SGP)
Martin Madden (GBR)

28 July 2021
21:15
v

Australia	4–2	New Zealand
Brand 9', 50'; Govers 55'; Wickham 57'	Report	Russell 13', 58'

South Pitch
Umpires:
Francisco Vázquez (ESP)
Marcin Grochal (POL)

29 July 2021
09:30
v

India	3–1	Argentina
Varun 43'; Vivek 58'; Harmanpreet 59'	Report	Casella 48'

North Pitch
Umpires:
Jakub Mejzlík (CZE)
Ben Göntgen (GER)

30 July 2021
10:00
v

Australia	1–1	Spain
Wickham 18'	Report	Quemada 60'

South Pitch
Umpires:
Javed Shaikh (IND)
Jakub Mejzlík (CZE)

30 July 2021
18:30
v

Japan	3–5	India
Ke. Tanaka 19'; Watanabe 33'; Murata 59'	Report	Harmanpreet 13'; Gurjant 17', 56'; Shamsher 34'; Nilakanta 51'

North Pitch
Umpires:
David Tomlinson (NZL)
Lim Hong Zhen (SGP)

30 July 2021
19:00
v

Argentina	4–1	New Zealand
Martínez 15+'; Vila 17'; Tolini 44'; Keenan 60'	Report	Russell 14'

South Pitch
Umpires:
Martin Madden (GBR)
Coen van Bunge (NED)

=== Group B ===
Pos	Team	Pld	W	D	L	GF	GA	GD	Pts	Qualification
1	Belgium	5	4	1	0	26	9	+17	13	Quarter-finals
2	Germany	5	3	0	2	19	10	+9	9	Quarter-finals
3	Great Britain	5	2	2	1	11	11	0	8	Quarter-finals
4	Netherlands	5	2	1	2	13	13	0	7	Quarter-finals
5	South Africa	5	1	1	3	16	24	−8	4	
6	Canada	5	0	1	4	9	27	−18	1	

Source: Tokyo 2020 and FIH
Rules for classification: 1) points; 2) matches won; 3) goal difference; 4) goals for; 5) head-to-head result; 6) field goals scored.

24 July 2021
11:45
v

Netherlands	1–3	Belgium
Hertzberger 35'	Report	Hendrickx 41', 44', 45'

North Pitch
Umpires:
Marcin Grochal (POL)
Adam Kearns (AUS)

24 July 2021
18:30
v

Great Britain	3–1	South Africa
Ward 2'; Ansell 32'; Waller 56'	Report	Guise-Brown 4'

North Pitch
Umpires:
Germán Montes de Oca (ARG)
Ben Goentgen (GER)

24 July 2021
19:00
v

Canada	1–7	Germany
K. Pereira 16'	Report	Windfeder 11', 28'; Rühr 22', 25'; Häner 44'; Bosserhoff 59'; Grambusch 60'

South Pitch
Umpires:
Peter Wright (RSA)
Francisco Vázquez (ESP)

25 July 2021
21:15
v

South Africa	3–5	Netherlands
M. Cassiem 2'; D. Cassiem 10'; Kok 18'	Report	Pruyser 24', 54'; Van Dam 29'; Brinkman 36'; Van der Weerden 48'

South Pitch
Umpires:
Jakub Mejzlík (CZE)
Javed Shaikh (IND)

26 July 2021
09:30
v

Germany	1–3	Belgium
Häner 51'	Report	Charlier 5', 7'; Hendrickx 35'

North Pitch
Umpires:
Coen van Bunge (NED)
David Tomlinson (NZL)

26 July 2021
11:45
v

Great Britain	3–1	Canada
Ansell 33', 57'; Ward 41'	Report	Van Son 51'

North Pitch
Umpires:
Lim Hong Zhen (SGP)
Marcin Grochal (POL)

27 July 2021
12:15
v

Germany	5–1	Great Britain
Fuchs 15', 51', 60'; Rühr 35'; Weigand 42'	Report	Roper 8'

South Pitch
Umpires:
Simon Taylor (NZL)
Adam Kearns (AUS)

27 July 2021
18:30
v

Belgium	9–4	South Africa
Dohmen 4', 15'; Hendrickx 9', 18', 40'; Briels 12'; Van Doren 15'; Gougnard 25'; Charlier 41'	Report	D. Cassiem 5', 31'; M. Cassiem 23'; Ntuli 29'

North Pitch
Umpires:
Raghu Prasad (IND)
Francisco Vázquez (ESP)

27 July 2021
20:45
v

Netherlands	4–2	Canada
Bakker 1'; Brinkman 4'; De Mol 50'; Pruyser 60'	Report	Wallace 10'; Tupper 53'

North Pitch
Umpires:
Javed Shaikh (IND)
David Tomlinson (NZL)

29 July 2021
10:00
v

Belgium	9–1	Canada
Hendrickx 12', 40'; Dockier 29', 32'; Denayer 39'; Gougnard 43', 45'; Boon 51'; Van Aubel 55'	Report	Pearson 15'

South Pitch
Umpires:
Simon Taylor (NZL)
Peter Wright (RSA)

29 July 2021
11:45
v

South Africa	4–3	Germany
Guise-Brown 9'; Horne 13'; Spooner 45'; M. Cassiem 48'	Report	Herzbruch 8'; Windfeder 22'; Staib 24'

North Pitch
Umpires:
David Tomlinson (NZL)
Javed Shaikh (IND)

29 July 2021
12:15
v

Netherlands	2–2	Great Britain
Brinkman 22'; Janssen 31'	Report	Ward 52', 57'

South Pitch
Umpires:
Raghu Prasad (IND)
Germán Montes de Oca (ARG)

30 July 2021
12:15
v

Canada	4–4	South Africa
Pearson 11'; K. Pereira 17'; Boothroyd 42'; Ho-Garcia 59'	Report	Ntuli 2'; Spooner 9'; Guise-Brown 34'; Mvimbi 58'

South Pitch
Umpires:
Germán Montes de Oca (ARG)
Raghu Prasad (IND)

30 July 2021
20:45
v

Germany	3–1	Netherlands
Wellen 10'; Staib 41'; Herzbruch 54'	Report	Hertzberger 57'

North Pitch
Umpires:
Marcin Grochal (POL)
Adam Kearns (AUS)

30 July 2021
21:15
v

Belgium	2–2	Great Britain
Boon 36'; Briels 43'	Report	Shipperley 17'; Ansell 38'

South Pitch
Umpires:
Simon Taylor (NZL)
Francisco Vázquez (ESP)

== Knockout stage ==
=== Bracket ===
Quarter-finals
1 August
Australia (p.s.o.)	2 (3)
Netherlands	2 (0)
1 August
Germany	3
Argentina	1
1 August
India	3
Great Britain	1
1 August
Belgium	3
Spain	1

Semi-finals
3 August
Australia	3
Germany	1
3 August
India	2
Belgium	5

Gold medal match
5 August
Australia	1 (2)
Belgium (p.s.o.)	1 (3)
Bronze medal match
5 August
Germany	4
India	5

=== Quarter-finals ===
1 August 2021
09:30
v

Germany	3–1	Argentina
Windfeder 19', 48'; Herzbruch 40'	Report	Casella 52'

Umpires:
Coen van Bunge (NED)
Jakub Mejzlík (CZE)

1 August 2021
12:00
v

Australia	2–2	Netherlands
Wickham 13', 38'	Report	Van der Weerden 32'; Hertzberger 50'
Penalties
Govers (penalty shoot-out scored); Ogilvie (penalty shoot-out scored); Brand (penalty shoot-out scored)	3–0	(penalty shoot-out missed) Hertzberger; (penalty shoot-out missed) Kemperman; (penalty shoot-out missed) De Geus

Umpires:
Ben Göntgen (GER)
Germán Montes de Oca (ARG)

1 August 2021
18:30
v

Belgium	3–1	Spain
Hendrickx 38', 57'; Boon 41'	Report	Alegre 26'

Umpires:
Adam Kearns (AUS)
Lim Hong Zhen (SGP)

1 August 2021
21:00
v

India	3–1	Great Britain
Dilpreet 7'; Gurjant 16'; Hardik 57'	Report	Ward 45'

Umpires:
Marcin Grochal (POL)
Simon Taylor (NZL)

=== Semi-finals ===
3 August 2021
10:30
v

India	2–5	Belgium
Harmanpreet 7'; Mandeep 8'	Report	Luypaert 2'; Hendrickx 19', 49', 53'; Dohmen 60'

Umpires:
Ben Göntgen (GER)
Coen van Bunge (NED)

3 August 2021
19:00
v

Australia	3–1	Germany
Brand 7'; Govers 27'; Sharp 59'	Report	Windfeder 11'

Umpires:
Germán Montes de Oca (ARG)
Marcin Grochal (POL)

=== Bronze medal match ===
5 August 2021
10:30
v

Germany	4–5	India (bronze)
Oruz 2'; Wellen 24'; Fürk 25'; Windfeder 48'	Report	Simranjeet 17', 34'; Hardik 27'; Harmanpreet 29'; Rupinder 31'

Umpires:
Adam Kearns (AUS)
Simon Taylor (NZL)

=== Gold medal match ===
5 August 2021
19:00
v

(silver) Australia	1–1	Belgium (gold)
Wickham 47'	Report	Van Aubel 32'
Penalties
Govers (penalty shoot-out missed); Ogilvie (penalty shoot-out scored); Brand (penalty shoot-out scored); Simmonds (penalty shoot-out missed); Whetton (penalty shoot-out missed)	2–3	(penalty shoot-out scored) Van Aubel; (penalty shoot-out scored) De Sloover; (penalty shoot-out missed) Denayer; (penalty shoot-out scored) Hendrickx

Umpires:
Coen van Bunge (NED)
Marcin Grochal (POL)

== Final ranking ==
As per statistical convention in field hockey, matches decided in regular time are counted as wins and losses, while matches decided by penalty shoot-outs are counted as draws.

Pos	Team	Pld	W	D	L	GF	GA	GD	Pts	Final result
1	Belgium	8	6	2	0	35	13	+22	20	Gold Medal
2	Australia	8	5	3	0	28	13	+15	18	Silver Medal
3	India	8	6	0	2	25	23	+2	18	Bronze Medal
4	Germany	8	4	0	4	27	19	+8	12	Fourth place
5	Great Britain	6	2	2	2	12	14	−2	8	Eliminated in quarter-finals
6	Netherlands	6	2	2	2	15	15	0	8	Eliminated in quarter-finals
7	Argentina	6	2	1	3	11	14	−3	7	Eliminated in quarter-finals
8	Spain	6	1	2	3	10	13	−3	5	Eliminated in quarter-finals
9	New Zealand	5	1	1	3	11	16	−5	4	Eliminated in group stage
10	South Africa	5	1	1	3	16	24	−8	4	Eliminated in group stage
11	Japan (H)	5	0	1	4	10	18	−8	1	Eliminated in group stage
12	Canada	5	0	1	4	9	27	−18	1	Eliminated in group stage

Source: Tokyo2020
(H) Hosts

== Goalscorers ==
There were 209 goals scored in 38 matches, for an average of 5.5 goals per match.

14 goals

- (Belgium) Alexander Hendrickx

7 goals

- (Australia) Blake Govers
- (Germany) Lukas Windfeder

6 goals

- (Australia) Tom Wickham
- (India) Harmanpreet Singh

5 goals

- (Australia) Tim Brand
- (United Kingdom) Sam Ward
- (Japan) Kenta Tanaka
- (New Zealand) Kane Russell

4 goals

- (United Kingdom) Liam Ansell
- (India) Rupinder Pal Singh
- (Spain) Pau Quemada

3 goals

- (Argentina) Maico Casella
- (Argentina) Leandro Tolini
- (Belgium) Tom Boon
- (Belgium) Cédric Charlier
- (Belgium) John-John Dohmen
- (Belgium) Simon Gougnard
- (Germany) Florian Fuchs
- (Germany) Timm Herzbruch
- (Germany) Christopher Rühr
- (India) Gurjant Singh
- (India) Simranjeet Singh
- (Netherlands) Thierry Brinkman
- (Netherlands) Jeroen Hertzberger
- (Netherlands) Mirco Pruyser
- (South Africa) Dayaan Cassiem
- (South Africa) Mustaphaa Cassiem
- (South Africa) Matthew Guise-Brown

2 goals

- (Argentina) Nicolás Keenan
- (Australia) Daniel Beale
- (Australia) Jeremy Hayward
- (Australia) Lachlan Sharp
- (Belgium) Thomas Briels
- (Belgium) Sébastien Dockier
- (Belgium) Florent Van Aubel
- (Canada) Mark Pearson
- (Canada) Keegan Pereira
- (Germany) Martin Häner
- (Germany) Constantin Staib
- (Germany) Niklas Wellen
- (India) Dilpreet Singh
- (India) Hardik Singh
- (Netherlands) Mink van der Weerden
- (New Zealand) Stephen Jenness
- (South Africa) Nqobile Ntuli
- (South Africa) Nicholas Spooner
- (Spain) David Alegre
- (Spain) Xavi Lleonart

1 goal

- (Argentina) Lucas Martínez
- (Argentina) Agustín Mazzilli
- (Argentina) Lucas Vila
- (Australia) Joshua Beltz
- (Australia) Tom Craig
- (Australia) Flynn Ogilvie
- (Australia) Aran Zalewski
- (Belgium) Félix Denayer
- (Belgium) Loïck Luypaert
- (Belgium) Arthur Van Doren
- (Canada) Fin Boothroyd
- (Canada) Gabriel Ho-Garcia
- (Canada) Floris Van Son
- (Canada) Scott Tupper
- (Canada) Jamie Wallace
- (Germany) Niklas Bosserhoff
- (Germany) Benedikt Fürk
- (Germany) Mats Grambusch
- (Germany) Timur Oruz
- (Germany) Justus Weigand
- (United Kingdom) Phil Roper
- (United Kingdom) Rupert Shipperley
- (United Kingdom) Jack Waller
- (India) Varun Kumar
- (India) Vivek Prasad
- (India) Nilakanta Sharma
- (India) Mandeep Singh
- (India) Shamsher Singh
- (Japan) Yoshiki Kirishita
- (Japan) Kazuma Murata
- (Japan) Kota Watanabe
- (Japan) Koji Yamasaki
- (Japan) Hirotaka Zendana
- (Netherlands) Billy Bakker
- (Netherlands) Thijs van Dam
- (Netherlands) Jip Janssen
- (Netherlands) Joep de Mol
- (New Zealand) Sam Lane
- (New Zealand) Jake Smith
- (New Zealand) Blair Tarrant
- (New Zealand) Nick Wilson
- (South Africa) Keenan Horne
- (South Africa) Tevin Kok
- (South Africa) Samkelo Mvimbi
- (Spain) Marc Boltó
- (Spain) Enrique González

Source: Tokyo2020 and FIH
