= 2022–23 Men's Belgian Hockey League =

Belgian Hockey League
- Season: 2022–23
- Dates: 4 September 2022 – 21 May 2023
- Champions: Gantoise (2nd title)
- Relegated: Leuven; Old Club
- Euro Hockey League: Gantoise; Léopold; Waterloo Ducks
- Matches played: 132
- Goals scored: 767 (5.81 per match)
- Best Player: Tom Boon
- Top goalscorer: Tom Boon (53 goals)
- Best goalkeeper: Loic Van Doren
- Biggest home win: Waterloo Ducks 9–0 Uccle Sport
- Biggest away win: Old Club 2–15 Dragons
- Highest scoring: Old Club 2–15 Dragons

The 2022–23 Men's Belgian Hockey League was the 103nd season of the Men's Belgian Hockey League, the top men's Belgian field hockey league.

The season started on 4 September 2022 and concluded on 21 May 2023 with the second match of the championship final. Racing were the defending champions.

Gantoise beat the Waterloo Ducks 5–2 on aggregate in the championship final to win their second title, 102 years after their first championship win.

== Teams ==
2022–23 Men's Belgian Hockey League teams
Location of Brussels teams in the 2022–23 Men's Belgian Hockey League

Uccle Sport and Old Club were the two promoted club from the 2021–22 National 1, replacing Beerschot and Antwerp.

Team	Location	Province
Braxgata	Boom	Antwerp
Daring	Molenbeek-Saint-Jean	Brussels
Dragons	Brasschaat	Antwerp
Gantoise	Ghent	East Flanders
Herakles	Lier	Antwerp
Léopold	Uccle	Brussels
Leuven	Heverlee	Flemish Brabant
Old Club	Liège	Liège
Orée	Woluwe-Saint-Pierre	Brussels
Racing	Uccle	Brussels
Uccle Sport	Uccle	Brussels
Waterloo Ducks	Waterloo	Walloon Brabant

=== Number of teams by provinces ===
Province	Number of teams	Team(s)
Brussels	5	Daring, Léopold, Orée, Racing, Uccle Sport
Antwerp	3	Braxgata, Dragons, Herakles
East Flanders	1	Gantoise
Flemish Brabant	1	Leuven
Liège	1	Old Club
Walloon Brabant	1	Waterloo Ducks
Total	12	

== Regular season ==
=== Standings ===
Pos	Team	Pld	W	D	L	GF	GA	GD	Pts	Qualification or relegation
1	Léopold	22	18	3	1	111	43	+68	57	Qualification for the Euro Hockey League and the play-offs
2	Dragons	22	15	4	3	86	37	+49	49	Qualification for the play-offs
3	Gantoise (C)	22	15	2	5	78	40	+38	47	Qualification for the Euro Hockey League and the play-offs
4	Waterloo Ducks	22	14	1	7	86	49	+37	43	Qualification for the Euro Hockey League and the play-offs
5	Orée	22	12	1	9	67	49	+18	37	
6	Racing	22	9	6	7	62	56	+6	33	
7	Herakles	22	10	1	11	58	61	−3	31	
8	Braxgata	22	8	6	8	52	43	+9	30	
9	Daring	22	6	2	14	39	68	−29	20	
10	Uccle Sport (O)	22	4	1	17	36	87	−51	13	Qualification for the relegation play-offs
11	Leuven (R)	22	4	1	17	36	93	−57	13	Relegation to the National 1
12	Old Club (R)	22	3	0	19	50	135	−85	9	Relegation to the National 1

Source: Flashscore
Rules for classification: 1) points; 2) matches won; 3) goal difference; 4) goals for; 5) head-to-head result.
(C) Champions; (O) Play-off winners; (R) Relegated

=== Results ===
Home \ Away	BRA	DAR	DRA	GAN	HER	LEO	LEU	OLD	ORE	RAC	UCC	WAT
Braxgata	—	2–3	1–3	3–3	2–0	1–3	5–1	7–1	1–1	2–2	2–2	3–5
Daring	1–2	—	1–5	1–5	0–4	1–2	3–4	7–2	3–2	0–4	2–1	1–4
Dragons	1–1	4–0	—	4–4	1–2	3–2	3–0	7–6	2–3	2–2	8–0	2–0
Gantoise	1–0	4–2	1–3	—	2–1	1–5	3–0	8–1	2–1	4–0	2–1	1–2
Herakles	3–1	1–2	3–0	4–3	—	1–2	7–1	4–2	2–7	4–4	4–1	2–3
Léopold	4–3	5–2	2–2	1–0	10–2	—	8–1	9–2	7–1	6–3	7–2	3–3
Leuven	0–3	2–2	1–5	2–7	2–1	5–6	—	3–1	1–7	2–7	4–3	0–7
Old Club	2–4	3–1	2–15	2–8	4–3	2–13	7–4	—	1–8	1–3	1–3	1–6
Orée	2–1	1–0	2–3	2–5	0–1	2–4	3–2	9–2	—	3–2	6–0	4–3
Racing	2–2	2–2	1–5	1–6	2–4	3–3	2–0	4–3	3–1	—	6–0	2–1
Uccle Sport	1–2	1–2	1–4	2–4	6–4	1–6	3–1	2–1	2–4	2–5	—	2–3
Waterloo Ducks	2–4	8–3	2–4	2–4	6–2	2–3	4–1	8–3	3–2	3–2	9–0	—

Source: Flashscore
Legend: Blue = home team win; Yellow = draw; Red = away team win.

=== Top goalscorers ===
Rank	Player	Club	FG	PC	PS	Goals
1	(Belgium) Tom Boon	Léopold	30	20	3	53
2	(France) Victor Charlet	Waterloo Ducks	0	33	1	34
3	(Argentina) Tomas Domene	Orée	10	16	4	30
4	(Belgium) Tanguy Cosyns	Racing	5	16	2	23
5	(Australia) Blake Govers	Dragons	2	17	1	20
6	(Belgium) Henri Raes	Dragons	15	0	0	15
6	(Belgium) Tom Degroote	Léopold	15	0	0	15
6	(Belgium) Arthur Verdussen	Léopold	12	3	0	15
9	(Belgium) Gaëtan Dykmans	Waterloo Ducks	12	2	0	14
9	(Argentina) Nicolás Della Torre	Dragons	1	13	0	14
9	(Belgium) Loïck Luypaert	Braxgata	0	10	4	14

== Play-offs ==
=== Bracket ===
Semi-finals
Léopold	3	2	5
Waterloo Ducks	4	3	7
Dragons	0	3	3
Gantoise	5	2	7

Final
Waterloo Ducks	0	2	2
Gantoise	3	2	5
Third place
Léopold (s.o.)	3 (5)
Dragons	3 (4)

=== Semi-finals ===
13 May 2023
13:30

Gantoise	5–0	Dragons
Hellin 4', 66'; Esquelin 17'; Goyet 57'; Kina 59'	Report

Ghent

14 May 2023
13:30

Dragons	3–2	Gantoise
Gougnard 6'; Della Torre 53'; Rubens 65'	Report	Duvekot 22', 37'

Brasschaat

Gantoise won 7–3 on aggregate.

13 May 2023
13:30

Waterloo Ducks	4–3	Léopold
Charlet 10', 38', 70'; Wilbers 57'	Report	Muschs 16'; Degroote 28'; Boon 39'

Waterloo

14 May 2023
13:30

Léopold	2–3	Waterloo Ducks
Baumgarten 28'; A. Verdussen 70'	Report	Charlet 31', 61'; De Backer 57'

Uccle

Waterloo Ducks won 7–5 on aggregate.

=== Final ===
20 May 2023
16:15

Gantoise	3–0	Waterloo Ducks
Tynevez 12'; Masson 28'; Duvekot 47'	Report

Brasschaat

21 May 2023
16:15

Waterloo Ducks	2–2	Gantoise
Dykmans 24', 62'	Report	Esquelin 13'; Clément 58'

Brasschaat

Gantoise won 5–2 on aggregate.

=== Third place ===
18 May 2023
15:45

Léopold	3–3	Dragons
Baumgarten 41', 60'; Verdussen 50'	Report	Della Torre 40'; Martinez 54'; Govers 69'

Brasschaat

Léopold won the shoot-out 5–4.

== Relegation play-offs ==
Uccle Sport won 10–7 on aggregate, and therefore both clubs remained in their respective leagues.

Team 1	Agg.	Team 2	1st leg	2nd leg
Antwerp	7–10	Uccle Sport	4–6	3–4

== Awards ==
Award	Winner	Club
Golden Stick – Player of the Year	(Belgium) Tom Boon	Léopold
Goalkeeper of the Year	(Belgium) Loic Van Doren	Dragons
Rising Star of the Year	(Belgium) Thomas Crols	Dragons
Coach of the Year	(Belgium) Pascal Kina	Gantoise
