= 2023–24 Men's Euro Hockey League =

Men's club field hockey tournament

Tournament details
- Host countries: Spain; Netherlands
- Dates: 6 October 2023 – 1 April 2024
- Teams: 20 (from 11 associations)
- Venue: 2 (in 2 host cities)

Final positions
- Champions: (Netherlands) Pinoké (1st title)
- Runner-up: (Netherlands) Kampong
- Third place: (England) Old Georgians

Tournament statistics
- Matches played: 26
- Goals scored: 144 (5.54 per match)
- Top scorer: Duco Telgenkamp (Kampong) (6 goals)

The 2023–24 Men's Euro Hockey League was the 17th season of the Men's Euro Hockey League, Europe's men's premier club field hockey tournament, organized by the European Hockey Federation.

The first round was held from 6 to 8 October 2023 in Barcelona, Spain and the Final8 took place from 28 March to 1 April 2024 in Amstelveen, Netherlands.

Bloemendaal were the defending champions, having won the last three editions. They were eliminated in the first round by Kampong. The hosts Pinoké won their first title by defeating Kampong 1–0 in the final. Old Georgians won their first medal by defeating Rot-Weiss Köln 3–2 in the bronze medal match.

== Association team allocation ==
A total of 20 teams from 11 of the 45 EHF member associations participated in the 2023–24 Men's Euro Hockey League. The association ranking based on the EHL country coefficients was used to determine the number of participating teams for each association:

- Associations 1–3 each had three teams qualify.
- Associations 4–6 each had two teams qualify.
- Associations 7–11 each had one team qualify.

=== Association ranking ===
For the 2023–24 Euro Hockey League, the associations were allocated places according to their 2022–23 EHL country coefficients, which takes into account their performance in European competitions from 2020–21 to 2022–23.

Association ranking for the 2023–24 Men's Euro Hockey League: Rank / Change / Association / Points / Teams; 1 / Steady / Netherlands / 41,167 / 3; 2 / Steady / Germany / 38,500 / 3; 3 / ▲1 / Belgium / 37,750 / 3; 4 / ▼1 / Spain / 32,833 / 2; 5 / Steady / England / 27,250 / 2; 6 / Steady / France / 22,375 / 2; 7 / Steady / Austria / 20,625 / 1; 8 / Steady / Scotland / 16,750 / 1; 9 / ▲1 / Ireland / 16,375 / 1; 10 / ▼1 / Switzerland / 15,625 / 1; 11 / ▲2 / Czech Republic / 12,500 / 1; Rank / Change / Association / Points / Teams; 12 / ▲4 / Ukraine / 11,875 / 0; 13 / ▲2 / Wales / 11,125 / 0; 14 / Steady / Portugal / 6,625 / 0; 15 / ▲2 / Denmark / 6,375 / 0; 16 / ▲4 / Croatia / 3,125 / 0; 17 / ▼6 / Belarus / 3,125 / 0; 18 / Steady / Italy / 2,875 / 0; 19 / ▼7 / Russia / 2,750 / 0; 20 / New entry / Turkey / 1,500 / 0; 21 / ▼2 / Poland / 0,750 / 0

=== Teams ===
The labels in the parentheses show how each team qualified for the place of its starting round:

- 1st, 2nd, 3rd: League positions of the previous season
- RS: Regular season winners

Qualified teams for 2023–24 Men's Euro Hockey League
Entry round	Teams	
Quarter-finals	(Netherlands) Pinoké (1st)	(Germany) Rot-Weiss Köln (1st)
Quarter-finals	(Belgium) Gantoise (1st)	(Spain) Club de Campo (1st)
Preliminary round	(Netherlands) Bloemendaal (2nd)	(Netherlands) Kampong (RS)
Preliminary round	(Germany) Mannheimer HC (2nd)	(Germany) Harvestehuder THC (3rd)
Preliminary round	(Belgium) Léopold (RS)	(Belgium) Waterloo Ducks (2nd)
Preliminary round	(Spain) Real Club de Polo (2nd)	(England) Old Georgians (1st)
Preliminary round	(England) Holcombe (2nd)	(France) CAM 92 (1st)
Preliminary round	Racing Club de France (2nd)	(Austria) Post SV (1st)
Preliminary round	(Scotland) Western Wildcats (1st)	(Ireland) Banbridge (1st)
Preliminary round	(Switzerland) Rotweiss Wettingen (1st)	(Czech Republic) Plzeň-Litice (1st)

== Preliminary round ==
The preliminary round was hosted by Real Club de Polo de Barcelona in Barcelona, Spain from 7 to 9 October 2023. The draw took place on 26 July 2023. The winners of the second round advanced to the quarter-finals during Easter 2024.

=== Bracket ===
First round
6 October
(Belgium) Waterloo Ducks	5
(Ireland) Banbridge	3
6 October
(England) Old Georgians	5
(Germany) Mannheimer HC	1
6 October
Racing Club de France	2
(England) Holcombe	4
6 October
(France) CAM 92	1
(Spain) Real Club de Polo	4
7 October
(Belgium) Léopold	1
(Germany) Harvestehuder THC	0
7 October
(Austria) Post SV (s.o.)	1 (2)
(Switzerland) Rotweiss Wettingen	1 (1)
7 October
(Netherlands) Bloemendaal	1
(Netherlands) Kampong	2
7 October
(Scotland) Western Wildcats	3
(Czech Republic) Plzeň-Litice	1

Second round
8 October
(Belgium) Waterloo Ducks	2
(England) Old Georgians	3
8 October
(England) Holcombe	0
(Spain) Real Club de Polo	1
8 October
(Belgium) Léopold	3
(Austria) Post SV	1
8 October
(Netherlands) Kampong	11
(Scotland) Western Wildcats	0

=== First round ===
6 October 2023
11:15

Waterloo Ducks (Belgium)	5–3	(Ireland) Banbridge
Charlet 13', 40'; Rogeau 37'; Depelsenaire 39', 56'	Report	L. Rowe 3', 47'; J. McKee 29'

Umpires:
Rebecca Edwards (ENG)
Ole Ingwersen (GER)

6 October 2023
13:30

Old Georgians (England)	5–1	(Germany) Mannheimer HC
Forsyth 8'; Morton 16'; J. Carson 42'; Ward 47', 56'	Report	Holste 4'

Umpires:
Sebastien Michielsen (BEL)
Benjamin Messerli (SUI)

6 October 2023
15:45

Racing Club de France	2–4	(England) Holcombe
Peters-Deutz 14', 49'	Report	Bandurak 7', 51'; Roper 23'; Russell 36'

Umpires:
Gema Calderon (ESP)
Daniël Veerman (NED)

6 October 2023
18:00

CAM 92 (France)	1–4	(Spain) Real Club de Polo
Liddiard 51'	Report	Recasens 31', 54'; Borras 36'; A. Reyne 57'

Umpires:
Nick Bennett (ENG)
Michaël Pontus (BEL)

7 October 2023
09:45

Post SV (Austria)	1–1	(Switzerland) Rotweiss Wettingen
Scholz 48'	Report	Aebi 60'
Penalties
Mar. Nyckowiak (penalty shoot-out scored); Kovalenko (penalty shoot-out missed); Kaltenböck (penalty shoot-out missed); Drusany (penalty shoot-out scored)	2–1	(penalty shoot-out missed) Conrad; (penalty shoot-out scored) Y. Morard; (penalty shoot-out missed) Flück; (penalty shoot-out missed) Marelli; (penalty shoot-out missed) M. Morard

Umpires:
Daniel Rodriguez (ESP)
Alex Fedenczuk (SCO)

7 October 2023
12:00

Léopold (Belgium)	1–0	(Germany) Harvestehuder THC
Boon 18'	Report

Umpires:
Rebecca Edwards (ENG)
Oliver Tarnoczi (AUT)

7 October 2023
14:15

Western Wildcats (Scotland)	3–1	(Czech Republic) Plzeň-Litice
F. Moran 13'; Christie 51'; McAllister 54'	Report	Uhlíř 51'

Umpires:
Sebastien Michielsen (BEL)
Kevin Roberts (WAL)

7 October 2023
16:30

Bloemendaal (Netherlands)	1–2	(Netherlands) Kampong
Van der Veen 51'	Report	Marree 31'; Janssen 52'

Umpires:
Gema Calderon (ESP)
Nick Bennett (ENG)

=== Ranking matches ===
7 October 2023
11:30

Banbridge (Ireland)	2–7	(Germany) Mannheimer HC
J. McKee 18'; Brown 47'	Report	Hartkopf 9'; Peillat 21', 32', 56'; Holste 51', 57'; Seagon 60'

Umpires:
Daniël Veerman (NED)
Michaël Pontus (BEL)

7 October 2023
16:00

Racing Club de France	3–6	(France) CAM 92
Kieffer 6'; Coffigniez 39'; Wiart 49'	Report	Poupée 15', 26', 60+'; Mayer 17'; Igau 24'; Gaillard 58'

Umpires:
Ole Ingwersen (GER)
Benjamin Messerli (SUI)

8 October 2023
11:30

Harvestehuder THC (Germany)	4–1	(Switzerland) Rotweiss Wettingen
Hasun 7'; Körper 14'; Ntuli 29'; A. Pöhling 57'	Report	M. Morard 45'

Umpires:
Oliver Tarnoczi (AUT)
Gema Calderon (ESP)

8 October 2023
16:00

Bloemendaal (Netherlands)	17–1	(Czech Republic) Plzeň-Litice
Bovelander 10'; J. Brinkman 12', 19', 53'; T. Brinkman 14', 16', 20', 47'; Miralles 27', 38'; Warmerdam 33', 35'; Beins 35', 51'; Van Doren 48'; Wortelboer 56', 60'	Report	Gerlický 32'

Umpires:
Alex Fedenczuk (SCO)
Rebecca Edwards (ENG)

=== Second round ===
8 October 2023
09:45

Waterloo Ducks (Belgium)	2–3	(England) Old Georgians
Charlet 22', 37'	Report	Ward 26'; Forsyth 40'; Proctor 49'

Umpires:
Daniël Veerman (NED)
Daniel Rodriguez (ESP)

8 October 2023
12:00

Holcombe (England)	0–1	(Spain) Real Club de Polo
	Report	Fortuño 1'

Umpires:
Sebastien Michielsen (BEL)
Michaël Pontus (BEL)

8 October 2023
14:15

Léopold (Belgium)	3–1	(Austria) Post SV
Boon 5'; De Trez 40'; A. Verdussen 48'	Report	Scholz 15+'

Umpires:
Nick Bennett (ENG)
Benjamin Messerli (SUI)

8 October 2023
16:30

Kampong (Netherlands)	11–0	(Scotland) Western Wildcats
Janssen 2', 50'; Telgenkamp 6', 36', 48', 59'; Lageman 27'; Pieters 47'; De Wijn 48'; B. Phijffer 55'; Marree 57'	Report

Umpires:
Ole Ingwersen (GER)
Kevin Roberts (WAL)

== Final8 ==
The Final8 was hosted by Pinoké and Amsterdam and held alongside the women's tournament at the Wagener Stadium in Amstelveen, Netherlands from 28 March to 1 April 2024. The draw was held on 13 December 2023. The schedule was announced on 15 December 2023.

=== Bracket ===
Quarter-finals
28 March
(Netherlands) Pinoké	1
(Spain) Real Club de Polo	0
28 March
(England) Old Georgians	4
(Spain) Club de Campo	2
29 March
(Belgium) Gantoise	1
(Netherlands) Kampong	2
29 March
(Belgium) Léopold	2
(Germany) Rot-Weiss Köln	3

Semi-finals
30 March
(Netherlands) Pinoké	4
(England) Old Georgians	1
31 March
(Netherlands) Kampong (s.o.)	5 (3)
(Germany) Rot-Weiss Köln	5 (2)

Final
1 April
(Netherlands) Pinoké	1
(Netherlands) Kampong	0
Bronze medal match
1 April
(England) Old Georgians	3
(Germany) Rot-Weiss Köln	2

=== Quarter-finals ===
28 March 2024
14:45

Old Georgians (England)	4–2	(Spain) Club de Campo
J. Carson 7', 8', 40'; Forsyth 60'	Report	Zorita 15'; Basterra 34'

Umpires:
Laurine Delforge (BEL)
Lukasz Zwierzchowski (POL)

28 March 2024
19:15

Pinoké (Netherlands)	1–0	(Spain) Real Club de Polo
Troost 22'	Report

Umpires:
Paul Walker (ENG)
Sebastien Michielsen (BEL)

29 March 2024
13:15

Léopold (Belgium)	2–3	(Germany) Rot-Weiss Köln
A. Verdussen 37'; Boon 60'	Report	T. Grambusch 26', 54'; Struthoff 34'

Umpires:
Coen van Bunge (NED)
Shane O'Donnell (IRL)

29 March 2024
17:45

Gantoise (Belgium)	1–2	(Netherlands) Kampong
T. Clément 25'	Report	Lageman 1'; Telgenkamp 55'

Umpires:
Paul Walker (ENG)
Sarah Wilson (SCO)

=== Ranking matches ===
30 March 2024
11:30

Real Club de Polo (Spain)	2–4	(Spain) Club de Campo
Ibran 8'; A. Reyne 15'	Report	Basterra 22', 30', 44'; Van Pelt 52'

Umpires:
Coen van Bunge (NED)
Michael Dutrieux (BEL)

31 March 2024
17:00

Gantoise (Belgium)	1–4	(Belgium) Léopold
T. Clément 54'	Report	Boon 1', 13'; Baumgarten 29', 30'

Umpires:
Coen van Bunge (NED)
Shane O'Donnell (IRL)

=== Semi-finals ===
30 March 2024
16:00

Pinoké (Netherlands)	4–1	(England) Old Georgians
Troost 1', 24'; Hendrickx 39', 44'	Report	Hiha 40'

Umpires:
Sebastien Michielsen (BEL)
Shane O'Donnell (IRL)

31 March 2024
14:45

Kampong (Netherlands)	5–5	(Germany) Rot-Weiss Köln
Telgenkamp 1'; Janssen 9', 56'; De Geus 22'; Lageman 29'	Report	T. Grambusch 8'; Seitz 42'; Struthoff 45'; M. Grambusch 54'; Prinz 60'
Penalties
De Geus (penalty shoot-out scored); Lageman (penalty shoot-out missed); De Vilder (penalty shoot-out missed); Sprengers (penalty shoot-out scored); Telgenkamp (penalty shoot-out scored)	3–2	(penalty shoot-out scored) Prinz; (penalty shoot-out scored) Struthoff; (penalty shoot-out missed) Große; (penalty shoot-out missed) Höchemer; (penalty shoot-out missed) M. Grambusch

Umpires:
Laurine Delforge (BEL)
Alison Keogh (IRL)

=== Bronze medal match ===
1 April 2024
11:30

Old Georgians (England)	3–2	(Germany) Rot-Weiss Köln
Forsyth 14'; Proctor 39', 54'	Report	T. Grambusch 42', 45'

Umpires:
Coen van Bunge (NED)
Michael Dutrieux (BEL)

=== Final ===
1 April 2024
16:15

Pinoké (Netherlands)	1–0	(Netherlands) Kampong
Hendrickx 10'	Report

Umpires:
Sebastien Michielsen (BEL)
Sarah Wilson (SCO)

== Top goalscorers ==
Rank	Player	Team	FG	PC	PS	Goals
1	(Netherlands) Duco Telgenkamp	(Netherlands) Kampong	6	0	0	6
2	(Belgium) Tom Boon	(Belgium) Léopold	2	3	0	5
2	(Germany) Tom Grambusch	(Germany) Rot-Weiss Köln	0	5	0	5
2	(Netherlands) Jip Janssen	(Netherlands) Kampong	0	5	0	5
5	(Netherlands) Thierry Brinkman	(Netherlands) Bloemendaal	4	0	0	4
5	(Wales) James Carson	(England) Old Georgians	3	1	0	4
5	(Spain) José Basterra	(Spain) Club de Campo	2	2	0	4
5	(Scotland) Alan Forsyth	(England) Old Georgians	2	0	2	4
5	(France) Victor Charlet	(Belgium) Waterloo Ducks	4	0	0	4

== See also ==
- 2024 Men's EuroHockey Club Trophy I
- 2024 Men's EuroHockey Indoor Club Cup
