= 2022–23 Men's Feldhockey-Bundesliga =

Men's Feldhockey Bundesliga
- Season: 2022–23
- Champions: Rot-Weiss Köln (11th title)
- Relegated: Düsseldorfer HC; Münchner SC
- Euro Hockey League: Rot-Weiss Köln; Mannheimer HC; Harvestehuder THC
- Matches: 96
- Goals: 523 (5.45 per match)
- Biggest home win: Mannheimer HC 10–1 Münchner SC; UHC Hamburg 9–0 Düsseldorfer HC
- Biggest away win: Düsseldorfer HC 0–7 Rot-Weiss Köln
- Highest scoring: Crefelder HTC 6–6 Harvestehuder THC

The 2022–23 Men's Feldhockey-Bundesliga was the 80th season of the Men's Feldhockey Bundesliga, Germany premier field hockey competition for men. The season began on 3 September 2022 and concluded on 4 June 2023 with the championship final.

Rot-Weiss Köln were the two-time defending champions. They defended their title by defeating Mannheimer HC 3–2 in the championship final.

== Teams ==
2022–23 Men's Feldhockey-Bundesliga teams
Location of Hamburg teams

A total of 12 teams participate in the 2022–23 edition of the Bundesliga. The promoted teams were Crefelder HTC and Münchner SC who replaced SC 1880 Frankfurt and Nürnberger HTC.

| Team | Location | State |
|---|---|---|
| Berliner HC | Berlin | Berlin |
| Club an der Alster | Hamburg | Hamburg |
| Crefelder HTC | Krefeld | North Rhine-Westphalia |
| Düsseldorfer HC | Düsseldorf | North Rhine-Westphalia |
| Hamburger Polo Club | Hamburg | Hamburg |
| Harvestehuder THC | Hamburg | Hamburg |
| Mannheimer HC | Mannheim | Baden-Württemberg |
| Münchner SC | Munich | Bavaria |
| Rot-Weiss Köln | Cologne | North Rhine-Westphalia |
| TSV Mannheim | Mannheim | Baden-Württemberg |
| UHC Hamburg | Hamburg | Hamburg |
| Uhlenhorst Mülheim | Mülheim | North Rhine-Westphalia |

=== Number of teams by state ===
| State | Number of teams | Clubs |
|---|---|---|
| Hamburg | 4 | Club an der Alster, Hamburger Polo Club, Harvestehuder THC and UHC Hamburg |
| North Rhine-Westphalia | 4 | Crefelder HTC, Düsseldorfer HC, Rot-Weiss Köln and Uhlenhorst Mülheim |
| Baden-Württemberg | 2 | Mannheimer HC and TSV Mannheim |
| Berlin | 1 | Berliner HC |
| Bavaria | 1 | Münchner SC |
| Total | 12 | |

== Regular season ==
=== Standings ===
==== Pool A ====
| Pos | Team | Pld | W | D | L | GF | GA | GD | Pts | Qualification |
|---|---|---|---|---|---|---|---|---|---|---|
| 1 | Rot-Weiss Köln | 16 | 10 | 3 | 3 | 59 | 23 | +36 | 33 | Qualification for the play-offs |
| 2 | UHC Hamburg | 16 | 9 | 4 | 3 | 50 | 27 | +23 | 31 | Qualification for the play-offs |
| 3 | Harvestehuder THC | 16 | 8 | 2 | 6 | 46 | 44 | +2 | 26 | Qualification for the play-offs |
| 4 | Crefelder HTC | 16 | 7 | 4 | 5 | 46 | 43 | +3 | 25 | Qualification for the play-offs |
| 5 | Uhlenhorst Mülheim | 16 | 7 | 3 | 6 | 40 | 36 | +4 | 24 | Qualification for the play-downs |
| 6 | Düsseldorfer HC | 16 | 0 | 0 | 16 | 18 | 87 | −69 | 0 | Qualification for the play-downs |

Source: hockey.de

==== Pool B ====
| Pos | Team | Pld | W | D | L | GF | GA | GD | Pts | Qualification |
|---|---|---|---|---|---|---|---|---|---|---|
| 1 | Mannheimer HC | 16 | 11 | 3 | 2 | 59 | 26 | +33 | 36 | Qualification for the play-offs |
| 2 | Hamburger Polo Club | 16 | 10 | 2 | 4 | 59 | 34 | +25 | 32 | Qualification for the play-offs |
| 3 | Club an der Alster | 16 | 8 | 3 | 5 | 43 | 39 | +4 | 27 | Qualification for the play-offs |
| 4 | Berliner HC | 16 | 7 | 1 | 8 | 48 | 52 | −4 | 22 | Qualification for the play-offs |
| 5 | Münchner SC | 16 | 3 | 2 | 11 | 29 | 59 | −30 | 11 | Qualification for the play-downs |
| 6 | TSV Mannheim | 16 | 2 | 1 | 13 | 26 | 53 | −27 | 7 | Qualification for the play-downs |

Source: hockey.de

=== Results ===
| Home \ Away | BHC | ALS | CRE | DHC | HPC | HAR | MHC | MSC | RWK | TSV | UHC | UHL |
|---|---|---|---|---|---|---|---|---|---|---|---|---|
| Berliner HC | — | 2–1 | 3–1 | — | 2–2 | 4–5 | 2–6 | 6–4 | — | 5–0 | 1–4 | — |
| Club an der Alster | 4–2 | — | — | 3–2 | 2–6 | — | 0–0 | 4–2 | 1–4 | 7–2 | 3–2 | — |
| Crefelder HTC | — | 2–2 | — | 5–1 | 1–3 | 6–6 | — | 3–2 | 2–2 | — | 2–2 | 3–2 |
| Düsseldorfer HC | 2–8 | — | 3–5 | — | — | 1–5 | 1–5 | 1–3 | 0–7 | — | 0–3 | 0–6 |
| Hamburger Polo Club | 9–1 | 5–1 | — | 4–2 | — | 3–4 | 1–1 | 3–1 | 3–1 | 3–1 | — | — |
| Harvestehuder THC | — | 1–3 | 2–4 | 7–2 | — | — | 1–3 | — | 2–1 | 2–1 | 1–2 | 4–1 |
| Mannheimer HC | 2–1 | 3–3 | 3–4 | — | 4–3 | — | — | 10–1 | 1–4 | 7–1 | — | 4–1 |
| Münchner SC | 3–2 | 2–3 | — | — | 2–6 | 1–2 | 1–4 | — | — | 1–1 | 1–0 | 3–3 |
| Rot-Weiss Köln | 2–0 | — | 5–2 | 8–0 | — | 5–0 | — | 7–1 | — | 1–0 | 2–2 | 2–2 |
| TSV Mannheim | 5–6 | 2–4 | 1–2 | 6–1 | 1–4 | — | 0–3 | 4–1 | — | — | — | 1–3 |
| UHC Hamburg | — | — | 4–3 | 9–0 | 7–3 | 2–2 | 2–3 | — | 4–3 | 3–0 | — | 3–2 |
| Uhlenhorst Mülheim | 2–3 | 2–1 | 2–1 | 3–2 | 2–1 | 5–2 | — | — | 3–5 | — | 1–1 | — |

Source: hockey.de
Legend: Blue = home team win; Yellow = draw; Red = away team win.

== Play-offs ==
=== Bracket ===
Quarter-finals
Mannheimer HC | 2 | 2 (2) | 2 (3)
Crefelder HTC | 5 | 2 (0) | 2 (2)
UHC Hamburg | 1 | 2 (8) | 1 (5)
Club an der Alster | 3 | 2 (7) | 1 (4)
Rot-Weiss Köln | 2 | 2 | 5
Berliner HC | 3 | 0 | 3
Hamburger Polo Club | 2 | 0 | 0
Harvestehuder THC | 1 | 1 | 4

Semi-finals
3 June – Mannheim
Mannheimer HC | 4
UHC Hamburg | 0
3 June – Mannheim
Rot-Weiss Köln | 2
Harvestehuder THC | 1

Final
4 June – Mannheim
Mannheimer HC | 2
Rot-Weiss Köln | 3
Third place
4 June – Mannheim
UHC Hamburg | 2
Harvestehuder THC | 3

=== Quarter-finals ===
13 May 2023
14:00

| Crefelder HTC | 5–2 | Mannheimer HC |
|---|---|---|
| Pfandt 7', 42'; Ferreiro 13', 18'; Boomes 20' | Report | Hartkopf 32'; Peillat 57' |

Gerd-Wellen-Hockeyanlage, Krefeld
Umpires:
Andreas Knechten
Christian Blasch

20 May 2023
16:00

| Mannheimer HC | 2–2 | Crefelder HTC |
|---|---|---|
| Müller 7'; Peillat 22' | Report | Pfandt 6', 35' |
Penalties
| Fischer (penalty shoot-out missed); Müller (penalty shoot-out missed); Weigand (penalty shoot-out scored); Hartkopf (penalty shoot-out scored) | 2–0 | (penalty shoot-out missed) Wellen; (penalty shoot-out missed) Acosta; (penalty shoot-out missed) Ehling; (penalty shoot-out missed) Bachmann |

Mannheimer HC, Mannheim
Umpires:
Raphaël Adrien
Tim Meissner

21 May 2023
14:00

| Mannheimer HC | 2–2 | Crefelder HTC |
|---|---|---|
| Seagon 41'; Peillat 59' | Report | Wellen 46'; Pfandt 47' |
Penalties
| Fischer (penalty shoot-out scored); Müller (penalty shoot-out missed); Weigand (penalty shoot-out scored); Hartkopf (penalty shoot-out missed); Barreiros (penalty shoot-out scored) | 3–2 | (penalty shoot-out scored) Wellen; (penalty shoot-out missed) Ferreiro; (penalty shoot-out missed) Boomes; (penalty shoot-out scored) Acosta |

Mannheimer HC, Mannheim
Umpires:
Stefan Leiber
Piere Papiest

Mannheimer HC won series 2–1.

13 May 2023
12:00

| Berliner HC | 3–2 | Rot-Weiss Köln |
|---|---|---|
| Neßelhauf 45', 48'; Gill 47' | Report | Rühr 12'; Siegburg 26' |

Berliner HC, Berlin
Umpires:
Pierre Papiest
Christoph Bastobbe

20 May 2023
13:00

| Rot-Weiss Köln | 2–0 | Berliner HC |
|---|---|---|
| M. Grambusch 13'; Mazkour 24' | Report |

REWE Sportpark, Cologne
Umpires:
Johannes Berneth
Thomas Lange

21 May 2023
12:00

| Rot-Weiss Köln | 5–3 | Berliner HC |
|---|---|---|
| Mazkour 13', 28', 56', 58'; M. Grambusch 13' | Report | Gill 51'; Klink 56'; Poeschel 60' |

REWE Sportpark, Cologne
Umpires:
Thomas Hinsken
Marcel Knakowski

Rot-Weiss Köln won series 2–1.

13 May 2023
16:00

| Harvestehuder THC | 1–2 | Hamburger Polo Club |
|---|---|---|
| Glander 14' | Report | Russell 21'; Smith 28' |

Anlage am Voßberg, Hamburg
Umpires:
Raphaël Adrien
Oscar Lohse

20 May 2023
14:00

| Hamburger Polo Club | 0–1 | Harvestehuder THC |
|---|---|---|
| | Report | Ntuli 28' |

Hamburger Polo Club, Hamburg
Umpires:
René Pleißner
Oscar Lohse

21 May 2023
14:00

| Hamburger Polo Club | 0–4 | Harvestehuder THC |
|---|---|---|
| | Report | Ntuli 33'; Glander 42'; Reuter 53'; Körper 56' |

Hamburger Polo Club, Hamburg
Umpires:
Ole Ingwersen
Sascha Sohns

Harvestehuder THC won series 2–1.

13 May 2023
16:00

| Club an der Alster | 3–1 | UHC Hamburg |
|---|---|---|
| Rothländer 10'; Walker 24'; Bruns 59' | Report | Schwarzhaupt 18' |

Der Club an der Alster, Hamburg
Umpires:
René Pleißner
Marcel Knakowski

20 May 2023
15:00

| UHC Hamburg | 2–2 | Club an der Alster |
|---|---|---|
| Schwarzhaupt 9'; Schmid 51' | Report | Walker 7'; Bruns 33' |
Penalties
| Kloss (penalty shoot-out scored); Sperling (penalty shoot-out scored); Golden (penalty shoot-out scored); Martins (penalty shoot-out scored); Müller (penalty shoot-out scored); Sperling (penalty shoot-out scored); Müller (penalty shoot-out scored); Martins (penalty shoot-out scored) | 8–7 | (penalty shoot-out scored) Boeckel; (penalty shoot-out scored) Walker; (penalty shoot-out scored) Fernandez; (penalty shoot-out scored) Linnekogel; (penalty shoot-out scored) Kerner; (penalty shoot-out scored) Boeckel; (penalty shoot-out scored) Walker; (penalty shoot-out missed) Fernandez |

UHC Hamburg, Hamburg
Umpires:
Ole Ingwersen
Sascha Sohns

21 May 2023
14:30

| UHC Hamburg | 1–1 | Club an der Alster |
|---|---|---|
| Kloss 18' | Report | Bruns 36' |
Penalties
| Kloss (penalty shoot-out scored); Sperling (penalty shoot-out scored); Golden (penalty shoot-out scored); Martins (penalty shoot-out scored); Müller (penalty shoot-out scored) | 5–4 | (penalty shoot-out scored) Boeckel; (penalty shoot-out scored) Kerner; (penalty shoot-out scored) Linnekogel; (penalty shoot-out scored) Walker; (penalty shoot-out missed) Wildung |

UHC Hamburg, Hamburg
Umpires:
René Pleißner
Oscar Lohse

UHC Hamburg won series 2–1.

=== Semi-finals ===
3 June 2023
16:15

| Rot-Weiss Köln | 2–1 | Harvestehuder THC |
|---|---|---|
| T. Grambusch 24'; Prinz 27' | Report | Ntuli 5' |

Mannheimer HC, Mannheim
Umpires:
Ben Göntgen
Raphaël Adrien

3 June 2023
18:30

| Mannheimer HC | 4–0 | UHC Hamburg |
|---|---|---|
| Weigand 13'; Peillat 18'; Hartkopf 35'; Hinrichs 59' | Report |

Mannheimer HC, Mannheim
Umpires:
Tim Meissner
Ole Ingwersen

=== Third place match ===
4 June 2023
13:45

| UHC Hamburg | 2–3 | Harvestehuder THC |
|---|---|---|
| Müller 26'; Kloss 30' | Report | Spooner 3'; Ntuli 6'; Körper 54' |

Mannheimer HC, Mannheim
Umpires:
Ben Göntgen
René Pleißner

=== Final ===
4 June 2023
16:15

| Mannheimer HC | 2–3 | Rot-Weiss Köln |
|---|---|---|
| Weigand 18'; Hinrichs 22' | Report | Rühr 8', 45'; Van der Weerden 49' |

Mannheimer HC, Mannheim
Umpires:
Tim Meissner
Ole Ingwersen
