= Alexander Hendrickx =

Belgian field hockey player (born 1993)

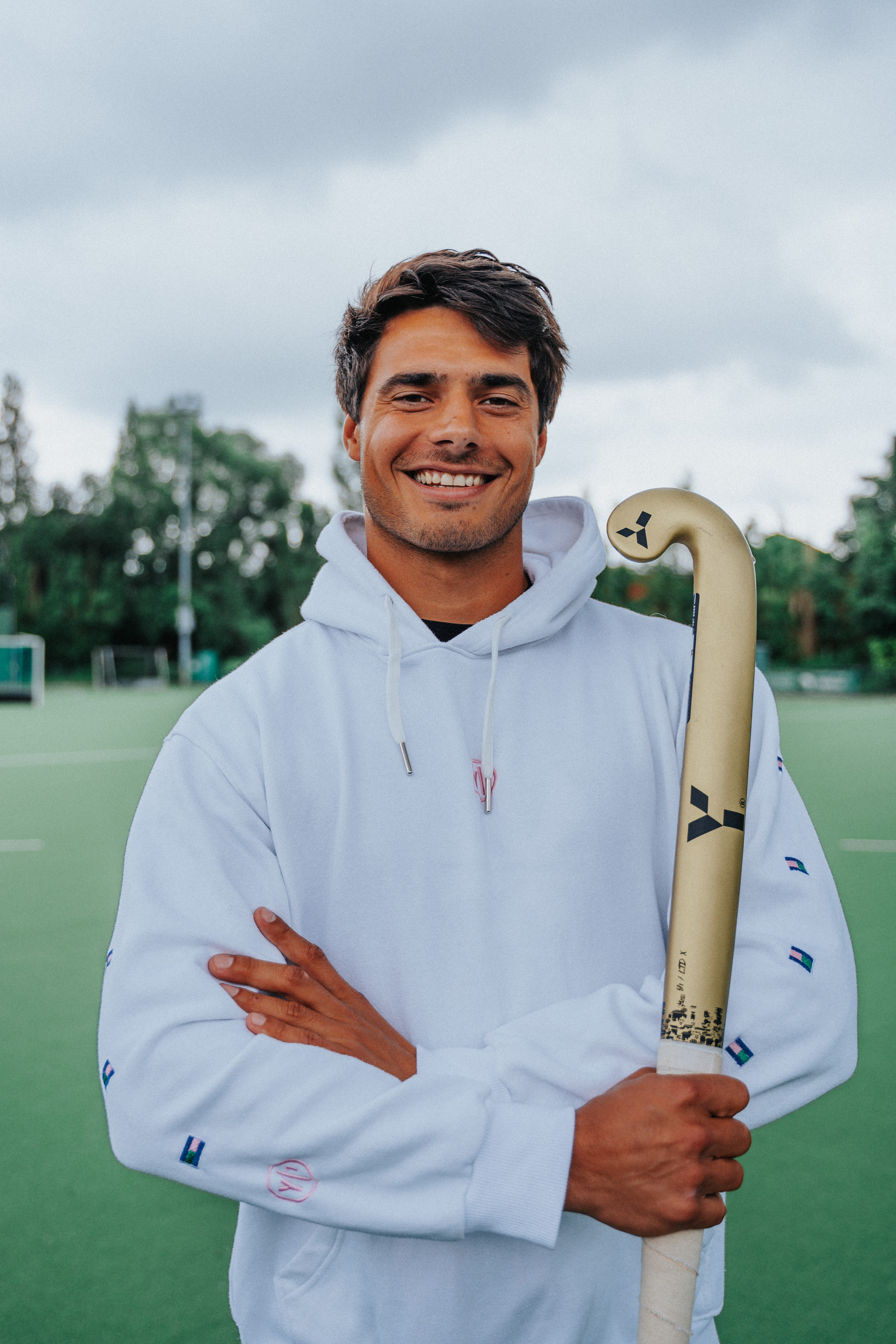
- Hendrickx in 2021

Personal information
- Full name: Alexander Robby Hendrickx
- Born: 6 August 1993 (age 33) Wilrijk, Belgium
- Height: 1.85 m (6 ft 1 in)
- Weight: 82 kg (181 lb)

Sport
- Sport: Field hockey
- Position: Defender
- Club: Gantoise
Youth career
- Team
- –: Antwerp
Senior career
Years	Team	Caps	Goals
–2015	Antwerp	-	-
2015–2018	Dragons	-	-
2018–2024	Pinoké	-	-
2024–present	Gantoise	-	-
2024–present	Kalinga Lancers	-	-
National team
Years	Team	Caps	Goals
2010	Belgium U18	6	(10)
2012–2014	Belgium U21	32	(10)
2012–present	Belgium	237	(143)
Medal record
Men's field hockey
Representing Belgium
Olympic Games
Gold medal – first place	2020 Tokyo	Team
World Cup
Gold medal – first place	2018 Bhubaneswar
Silver medal – second place	2023 Bhubaneswar–Rourkela
EuroHockey Championship
Gold medal – first place	2019 Antwerp
Silver medal – second place	2017 Amstelveen
Bronze medal – third place	2021 Amstelveen
Bronze medal – third place	2023 Mönchengladbach
Hockey World League
Silver medal – second place	2014–15 Raipur	Team
Youth Olympic Games
Bronze medal – third place	2010 Singapore	Team

Alexander Robby Hendrickx (born 6 August 1993) is a Belgian professional field hockey player who plays for Gantoise and the Belgian national team as a defender. Hendrickx won 'top goal scorer' at the 2020 Tokyo Olympics. He also won a gold medal with his team for Belgium.

== International career ==
=== Junior national teams ===
Hendrickx has represented Belgium at junior level in both Under 18 and Under 21 age groups. In 2010, Hendrickx was a member of the Belgium Under-18 side at the 2010 Youth Olympic Games in Singapore. The team won the bronze medal, defeating Ghana 4–1 in the third-place playoff. He made his debut for the Belgium Under 21 side, in 2012 at a qualifying for the Junior World Cup. Hendrickx was also a member of the team at the Junior World Cup in New Delhi, India, where the team finished sixth.

=== Senior national team ===
Hendrickx made his senior international debut for Belgium in 2012, at the Champions Trophy. He was a reserve player at the 2016 Summer Olympics, where Belgium won a silver medal. In November 2018, he was named in the squad for the 2018 World Cup in Bhubaneswar, India. At the tournament, he finished as top scorer alongside Blake Govers of Australia with 7 goals. At the 2019 EuroHockey Championship, he also was the top goalscorer together with three other players with five goals. On 25 May 2021, he was selected in the squad for the 2021 EuroHockey Championship. He was top goal scorer at Tokyo 2020 with 14 goals using the LTD X.

=== 2020 Olympics ===
Alex Hendrickx won Olympic Gold at Tokyo 2020. He was the top goal scorer with 14 goals. He scored a hat-trick in the opening game in their 4–1 win against The Netherlands. He scored another hat-trick against South Africa. In the final group game against Great Britain he suffered a bad injury when he got a stick to the face. He recovered for the knock out stages wearing a protective headband.

== Club career ==
Hendrickx started playing hockey for Royal Antwerp. After having played three seasons for Belgian club Dragons he transferred to the Netherlands to play for Pinoké in Amstelveen. He became the top scorer in the 2020–21 Hoofdklasse with 21 goals.

In 2024 Kalinga Lancers acquired him in auction to play in 2024-25 Hockey India League

With Gantoise HC he won the 2025 Euro Hockey League final, scoring a hat-trick in a 5–2 win over HC Bloemendaal.

== Honours ==
=== Club ===
Dragons

- Belgian Hockey League: 2015–16, 2016–17, 2017–18

Pinoké

- Hoofdklasse: 2022–23
- Euro Hockey League: 2023–24

Gantoise

- Belgian Hockey League: 2024–25
- Euro Hockey League: 2024–25

=== International ===
Belgium

- Summer Olympics gold medal: 2020
- World Cup: 2018
- EuroHockey Championship: 2019
- FIH Pro League: 2020–21
