= ZSV Schaerweijde =

Schaerweijde
- Full name: Zeister Sportvereniging Schaerweijde
- League: Men's Hoofdklasse, Women's Overgangsklasse
- Founded: 12 February 1932
- Home ground: Sportpark Krakelingsweg, Zeist
- Website: www.schaerweijde-hockey.nl
Home	Away

Zeister Sportvereniging Schaerweijde, also known as ZSV Schaerweijde or simply Schaerweijde, is a Dutch field hockey and golf club based in Zeist. It was founded in 1932.

== Honours ==
=== Men ===
- Promotieklasse
  - Winners (1): 2021–22

== Current squad ==
=== Men's squad ===
As of 25 September 2026

No.	Pos.	Nation	Player
1	GK	NED	Mahinder Terlouw
2	DF	NED	Tijs van Horn
3	DF	NED	Mick Bosse
4	DF	NED	Joost van Eijck
5	DF	NED	Jaap Solleveld
6	DF	NED	Pepijn Leenhouts (Captain)
7	MF	NED	Lode Draaijer
8	MF	NED	Casper van Loon
9	FW	NED	Teun van Aalderen
10	FW	NED	Daan Troost
11	FW	NED	Niels de Joode

No.	Pos.	Nation	Player
12	FW	NED	Jens Hagen
13	MF	NED	Arnoud Raymakers
14	MF	NED	Stijn Draaijer
15	GK	NED	Guus van Holten
16	MF	NED	Balder Reyenga
17	FW	NED	Quiten Moojen
18	MF	NED	Thibaut Mordac
20	FW	NED	Jelle Westendorp
22	DF	NED	Pepijn Godefroy
23	FW	JPN	Kosei Kawabe
24	DF	NED	Maarten Bruisten
