= SV Kampong =

Dutch field hockey club

Kampong
- Full name: Sportvereniging Kampong Hockey
- League: Men's Hoofdklasse; Women's Hoofdklasse
- Founded: 29 September 1902; 123 years ago
- Home ground: De Klapperboom, Utrecht
- Website: Club website
| Home | Away |

Sportvereniging Kampong Hockey (Dutch: [ˈkɑmpɔŋ], Javanese: [ˈkɑmpuŋ]), also known as SV Kampong or simply Kampong, is a Dutch professional field hockey club based in Utrecht. It was founded in 1902, making it the second-oldest hockey club in the Netherlands.

Both the men's and the women's 1st XI compete in the Hoofdklasse, the country's top-tier league. The men's team won the play-off final in the 2023-24 season after finishing 3rd in the regular season. They lost the 2023–24 Men's Euro Hockey League final (0–1) to Pinoké.

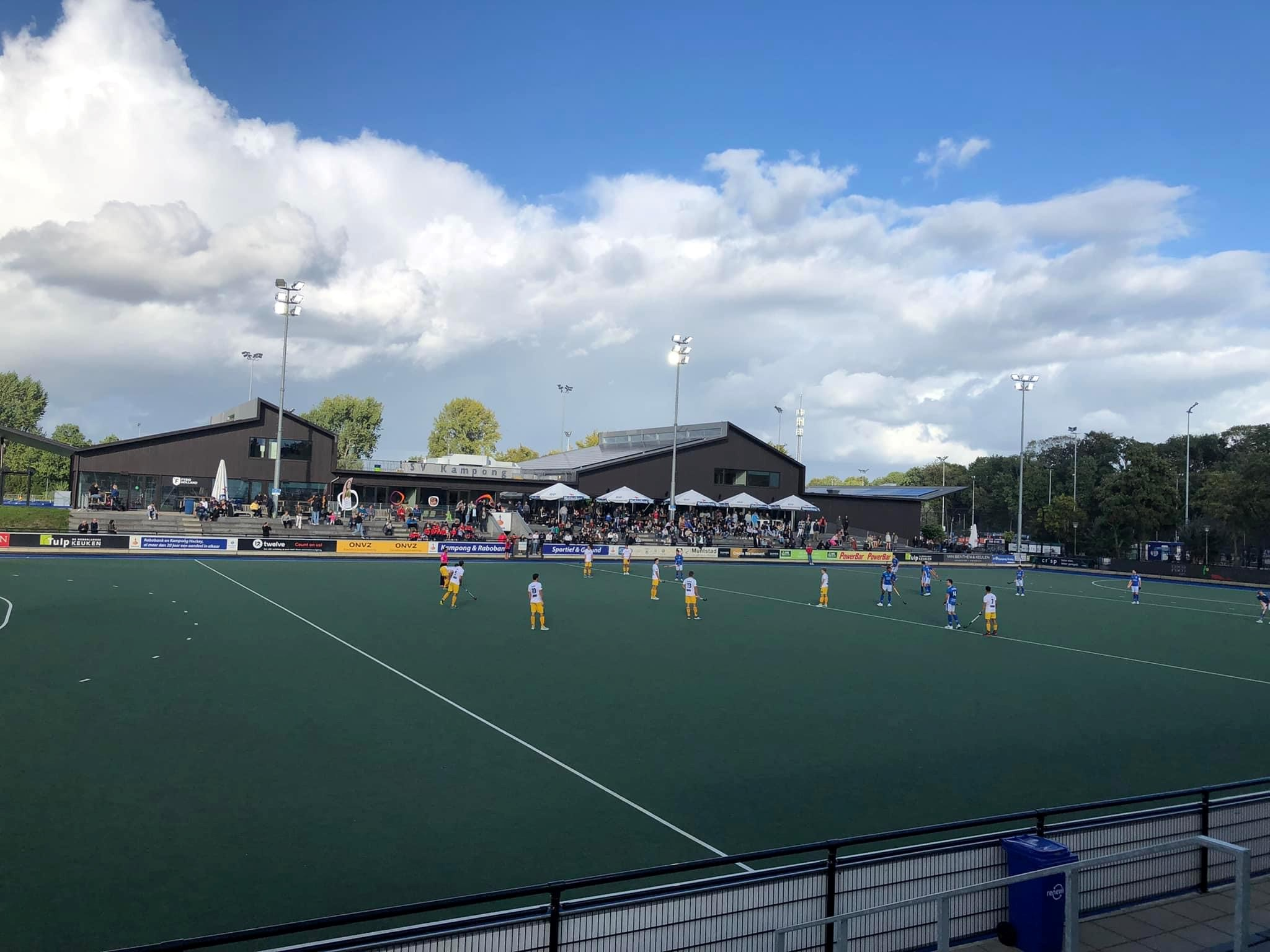
De Klapperboom, Utrecht

== Etymology ==
The term 'kampong' / ꦏꦩ꧀ꦥꦸꦁ (kampung, Javanese pronunciation: ['kɑmpuŋ]) is Javanese in origin and means "village". The founders of the club lived in the Zeeheldenbuurt (Utrecht), which was nicknamed 'kampong' for its many inhabitants who had lived in the Dutch East Indies or served in the Armed Forces in the Dutch East Indies (KNIL).

== Honours ==
=== Men ===
National title / Hoofdklasse

- Winners (9): 1967–68, 1971–72, 1972–73, 1973–74, 1975–76, 1984–85, 2016–17, 2017–18, 2023–24
- Runners-up (9): 1966–67, 1976–77, 1979–80, 1981–82, 1985–86, 1989–90, 2014–15, 2018–19, 2020–21

Gold Cup

- Winners (1): 2023–24

Euro Hockey League

- Winners (2): 2015–16, 2025–26
- Runners-up (2): 2017–18, 2023–24

European Cup

- Winners (1): 1986
- Runners-up (1): 1974

Cup Winners' Cup

- Winners (1): 1991

Hoofdklasse Indoor

- Winners (2): 2006–07, 2012–13

=== Women ===
Hoofdklasse

- Winners (2): 1993–94, 1994–95
- Runners-up (1): 1995–96

European Cup

- Winners (2): 1995, 1996

Cup Winners' Cup

- Winners (1): 1997

Hoofdklasse Indoor

- Winners (7): 2004–05, 2005–06, 2006–07, 2008–09, 2009–10, 2010–11, 2015–16

== Players ==
=== Current squad ===
==== Women's squad ====
Head coach: Fleur van de Kieft

As of 10 September 2021

| No. | Pos. | Nation | Player |
|---|---|---|---|
| 1 | GK | IRE | Ayeisha McFerran |
| 2 | GK | NED | Babette Backers |
| 3 | DF | NED | Gabrielle Mosch |
| 4 | FW | NED | Bente van der Veldt |
| 5 | FW | NED | Michelle Simons |
| 6 | MF | NED | Carmen Wijsman |
| 7 | DF | NED | Laura van Weeren |
| 10 | MF | NED | Luna Fokke |
| 11 | DF | NED | Carlijn Tukkers |
| 12 | MF | NED | Pam Imhof |

| No. | Pos. | Nation | Player |
|---|---|---|---|
| 13 | FW | NED | Mabel Brands |
| 14 | MF | NED | Malou Pheninckx (Captain) |
| 15 | DF | BEL | Vanessa Blockmans |
| 16 | | AUS | Alice Arnott |
| 17 | | NED | Tess Zweers |
| 18 | | NED | Sabine Sleijffers |
| 19 | FW | NED | Julia van den Heuvel |
| 22 | GK | ARG | Priscila Jori |
| 23 | | NED | Bieke Wijnmaalen |
| 24 | MF | ARG | Pilar Romang |

==== Men's squad ====
As of 13 September 2024

| No. | Pos. | Nation | Player |
|---|---|---|---|
| 1 | GK | IRE | David Harte |
| 2 | DF | NED | Bram van Battum |
| 3 | DF | NED | Jens de Vuijst |
| 4 | DF | NED | Jip Janssen |
| 6 | DF | NED | Lars Balk (Captain) |
| 7 | FW | NED | Boet Phijffer |
| 8 | MF | NED | Jonas de Geus (Captain) |
| 9 | FW | NED | Finn van Bijnen |
| 10 | MF | NED | Silas Lageman |
| 11 | FW | NED | Terrance Pieters |
| 12 | DF | NED | Sander de Wijn |

| No. | Pos. | Nation | Player |
|---|---|---|---|
| 13 | FW | NED | Mats Gruter |
| 14 | FW | NED | Duco Telgenkamp |
| 15 | GK | RSA | Estiaan Kriek |
| 16 | | NED | Hugo van Beusekom |
| 17 | MF | NED | Rik Sprengers |
| 18 | | NED | Mats Marree |
| 19 | | NED | Kjell Plantenga |
| 20 | | NED | Pepijn Luykx |
| 21 | | NED | Casper Dobbelaar |
| 22 | FW | NED | Jelle Phijffer |
| 23 | MF | NED | Derck de Vilder |

=== Notable players ===
==== Men's internationals ====
Netherlands

- André Bolhuis
- Paul Litjens
- Tom van 't Hek
- Arno den Hartog
- Jacques Brinkman
- Thierry Brinkman
- Leo Klein Gebbink
- Robbert Kemperman
- Jaap Stockmann
- Roderick Weusthof

Australia

- Grant Schubert

Ireland

- David Harte

New Zealand

- Dean Couzins

Spain

- Ramón Alegre

==== Women's internationals ====
Netherlands

- Roos Drost
- Ellen Kuipers
- Renée van Laarhoven
- Jeannette Lewin
- Malou Pheninckx
- Michelle van der Pols
- Lisanne de Roever
- Marijn Veen
- Margot Zuidhof

England/Great Britain

- Sophie Bray

Spain

- María López
- Georgina Oliva
