= Men's Hoofdklasse Hockey =

Sports league

Hoofdklasse
- Most recent season or competition: 2025–26 Men's Hoofdklasse Hockey
- Sport: Field hockey
- Founded: 1973; 53 years ago
- First season: 1973–74
- Administrator: KNHB
- No. of teams: 12
- Country: Netherlands
- Confederation: EHF (Europe)
- Most recent champion: Rotterdam (2nd title) (2025–26)
- Most titles: Amsterdam, Bloemendaal (22 each)
- Broadcasters: Viaplay; NOS
- Level on pyramid: 1
- Relegation to: Promotieklasse
- Domestic cup: Gold Cup
- International cup: Euro Hockey League

The Men's Hoofdklasse Hockey, currently known as the Tulp Hoofdklasse Men for sponsorship reasons, is the men's top division of field hockey in the Netherlands. The league ranks first in the European league ranking table. The league was established in 1973, and before the league existed the champions of the several district played in a championship pool to determine the national champion.

Rotterdam are the current champions, having won the 2025–26 season by defeating Amsterdam in the championship final. Amsterdam and Bloemendaal have the most titles with 22 each.

== Format ==
The season starts in August or September each year and is interrupted by the indoor hockey season from November to February. The outdoor season resumes from March. The league is played by twelve teams who play each other twice, competing for four spots in the championship play-offs. The number one and four and the number two and three play each other in the semi-finals and the winners qualify for the final where the winner will be crowned champion. Each semi-final and the final consist of two-leg matches, with the winner determined by the highest aggregate score over both home and away games. The last placed team is relegated to the second division, the Promotieklasse. The eleventh-placed team plays in a relegation play-off against the runners-up of the Promotieklasse and the tenth-placed team plays a relegation play-off against the third-placed from the Promotieklasse. The winners of these matches will play the next season in the Hoofdklasse.

== Teams ==
2026–27 Men's Hoofdklasse teams

=== Accommodation and locations ===
Team	Location	Province	Accommodation
Amsterdam	Amstelveen	North Holland	Wagener Stadium
Bloemendaal	Bloemendaal	North Holland	Sportpark 't Kopje
Den Bosch	's-Hertogenbosch	North Brabant	Sportpark Oosterplas
HDM	The Hague	South Holland	Sportpark Duinzigt
Kampong	Utrecht	Utrecht	De Klapperboom
Klein Zwitserland	The Hague	South Holland	Sportpark Klein Zwitserland
Oranje-Rood	Eindhoven	North Brabant	Sportpark Aalsterweg
Pinoké	Amstelveen	North Holland	Amsterdamse Bos
Rotterdam	Rotterdam	South Holland	Hazelaarweg Stadion
SCHC	Bilthoven	Utrecht	Sportpark Kees Boekelaan
Schaerweijde	Zeist	Utrecht	Sportpark Krakelingsweg
HC Tilburg	Tilburg	North Brabant	Sportpark Oude Warande

== List of champions ==
=== National champions (1897–1973) ===
No.	Season	Champions	Runners-up
1	1898–99	Haagsche HBC (1)	Haarlemsche HBC (1)
2	1899–1900	Haarlemsche HBC (1)	Haagsche HBC (1)
3	1900–01	Haagsche HBC (2)	Haarlemsche HBC (2)
–	1901–02	Not held	
4	1902–03	Haarlemsche HBC (2)	HMHC (1)
5	1903–04	HMHC (1)	Haarlemsche HBC (3)
6	1904–05	Haarlemsche HBC (3)	HMHC (2)
7	1905–06	HMHC (2)	Amsterdam (1)
8	1906–07	HVV (1)	Amsterdam (2)
9	1907–08	ODIS (1)	HHV (1)
10	1908–09	HVV (2)	Amsterdam (3)
11	1909–10	De Musschen (1)	HHV (2)
12	1910–11	De Musschen (2)	HHV (3)
13	1911–12	De Musschen (3)	TOGO (1)
14	1912–13	TOGO (1)	De Musschen (1)
15	1913–14	TOGO (2)	Hilversum (1)
–	1914–15	Not held	
16	1915–16	TOGO (3)	HOC (1)
17	1916–17	TOGO (4)	Amsterdam (4)
18	1917–18	TOGO (5)	Bloemendaal (1)
19	1918–19	Bloemendaal (1)	HDM (1)
20	1919–20	Bloemendaal (2)	HOC (2)
21	1920–21	Bloemendaal (3)	TOGO (2)
22	1921–22	Bloemendaal (4)	Bloemendaal (2)
23	1922–23	Bloemendaal (5)	HDM (2)

No.	Season	Champions	Runners-up
24	1923–24	HDM (1)	Bloemendaal (3)
25	1924–25	Amsterdam (1)	Bloemendaal (4)
26	1925–26	Amsterdam (2)	Deventer (1)
27	1926–27	Amsterdam (3)	Deventer (2)
28	1927–28	Amsterdam (4)	Deventer (3)
29	1928–29	Amsterdam (5)	Deventer (4)
30	1929–30	HDM (2)	Deventer (5)
31	1930–31	HDM (3)	Deventer (6)
32	1931–32	Amsterdam (6)	PW (1)
33	1932–33	Amsterdam (7)	Deventer (7)
34	1933–34	Amsterdam (8)	PW (2)
35	1934–35	HDM (4)	Breda (1)
36	1935–36	HDM (5)	PW (3)
37	1936–37	Amsterdam (9)	Breda (2)
38	1937–38	BMHC (1)	Breda (3)
39	1938–39	Venlo (1)	Gooi (1)
–	1939–40	Not held	
40	1940–41	HDM (6)	Venlo (1)
41	1941–42	HDM (7) & Venlo (2)	—N/a
42	1942–43	Venlo (3)	HDM (3)
43	1943–44	Hilversum (1)	PW (4)
–	1944–45	Not held	
44	1945–46	Venlo (4)	HDM (4)
–	1946–47	Not held	
45	1947–48	HHIJC (1)	Venlo (2)

No.	Season	Champions	Runners-up
46	1948–49	HHIJC (2)	Venlo (3)
47	1949–50	Venlo (5)	HHIJC (1)
48	1950–51	HHIJC (3)	Venlo (4)
49	1951–52	HHIJC (4)	Venlo (5)
50	1952–53	Venlo (6)	HHIJC (2)
51	1953–54	TOGO (6)	Venlo (6)
52	1954–55	Venlo (7)	HHIJC (3)
53	1955–56	Laren (1)	DKS (1)
54	1956–57	TOGO (7)	HTCC (1)
55	1957–58	DSHC (1)	Venlo (7)
56	1958–59	SCHC (1)	Venlo (8)
57	1959–60	Tilburg (1)	Laren (1)
58	1960–61	Laren (2)	Venlo (9)
59	1961–62	Amsterdam (10)	EMHC (1)
–	1962–63	Not held	
60	1963–64	Amsterdam (11)	PW (5)
61	1964–65	Amsterdam (12)	HTCC (2)
62	1965–66	Amsterdam (13)	Hattem (1)
63	1966–67	Venlo (8)	Kampong (1)
64	1967–68	Kampong (1)	HTCC (3)
65	1968–69	Laren (3)	Venlo (10)
66	1969–70	Tilburg (2)	HTCC (4)
67	1970–71	HTCC (1)	HGC (1)
68	1971–72	Kampong (2)	HHIJC (4)
69	1972–73	Kampong (3)	HTCC (5)

=== Hoofdklasse era (1973–present) ===
Season	Champions	Runners-up	Top goalscorer (Club)	Goals
1973–74	Kampong (4)	Amsterdam (5)	(Netherlands) Paul Litjens (Kampong) (Netherlands) Patty Mundt (Hattem)	20
1974–75	Amsterdam (14)	Klein Zwitserland (1)	(Netherlands) Paul Litjens (Kampong)	28
1975–76	Kampong (5)	Klein Zwitserland (1)	(Netherlands) Paul Litjens (Kampong)	28
1976–77	Klein Zwitserland (1)	Kampong (2)	(Netherlands) Paul Litjens (Kampong)	18
1977–78	Klein Zwitserland (2)	HGC (2)	(Netherlands) Paul Litjens (Kampong)	26
1978–79	Klein Zwitserland (3)	HGC (3)	(Netherlands) Paul Litjens (Kampong)	24
1979–80	Klein Zwitserland (4)	Kampong (3)	(Netherlands) Paul Litjens (Kampong)	38
1980–81	Klein Zwitserland (5)	HGC (4)	(Netherlands) Ties Kruize (Klein Zwitserland)	57
1981–82	Klein Zwitserland (6)	Kampong (4)	(Netherlands) Ties Kruize (Klein Zwitserland)	42
1982–83	Klein Zwitserland (7)	Amsterdam (6)	(Netherlands) Ties Kruize (Klein Zwitserland) (Netherlands) Hidde Kruize (Klein Zwitserland)	26
1983–84	Klein Zwitserland (8)	Amsterdam (7)	(Netherlands) Maarten van Grimbergen (Klein Zwitserland)	25
1984–85	Kampong (6)	Bloemendaal (5)	(Netherlands) Rick Volkers (Kampong)	21
1985–86	Bloemendaal (6)	Kampong (5)	(Netherlands) Patrick Faber (Amsterdam)	25
1986–87	Bloemendaal (7)	HGC (5)	(Netherlands) Floris Jan Bovelander (Bloemendaal)	27
1987–88	Bloemendaal (8)	HGC (6)	(Netherlands) Floris Jan Bovelander (Bloemendaal)	25
1988–89	Bloemendaal (9)	Amsterdam (8)	(Netherlands) Floris Jan Bovelander (Bloemendaal)	36
1989–90	HGC (1)	Kampong (6)	(Netherlands) Floris Jan Bovelander (Bloemendaal)	24
1990–91	Bloemendaal (10)	HGC (7)	(Netherlands) Floris Jan Bovelander (Bloemendaal)	32
1991–92	HDM (8)	Bloemendaal (6)	(Netherlands) Gijs Weterings (HGC)	28
1992–93	Bloemendaal (11)	HGC (8)	(Netherlands) Taco van den Honert (Amsterdam)	27
1993–94	Amsterdam (15)	Bloemendaal (7)	(Netherlands) Floris Jan Bovelander (Bloemendaal)	28
1994–95	Amsterdam (16)	HDM (5)	(Netherlands) Taco van den Honert (Amsterdam)	42
1995–96	HGC (2)	Bloemendaal (8)	(Netherlands) Bram Lomans (HGC)	26
1996–97	Amsterdam (17)	Den Bosch (1)	(Netherlands) Bram Lomans (HGC)	33
1997–98	Den Bosch (1)	Amsterdam (9)	(Netherlands) Bram Lomans (HGC) (Netherlands) Piet-Hein Geeris (Den Bosch) (Netherlands) Richard de Snaijer (HDM)	29
1998–99	Bloemendaal (12)	Oranje Zwart (1)	(Netherlands) Bram Lomans (HGC)	29
1999–2000	Bloemendaal (13)	Den Bosch (2)	(Netherlands) Paul Robert Lankhout (Kampong)	31
2000–01	Den Bosch (2)	Oranje Zwart (2)	(Netherlands) Teun de Nooijer (Bloemendaal)	24
2001–02	Bloemendaal (14)	Amsterdam (10)	(Netherlands) Sander Dreesmann (Klein Zwitserland)	24
2002–03	Amsterdam (18)	Oranje Zwart (3)	(Netherlands) Taeke Taekema (Klein Zwitserland)	33
2003–04	Amsterdam (19)	Bloemendaal (9)	(England) David Mathews (Amsterdam)	34
2004–05	Oranje Zwart (1)	Bloemendaal (10)	(Netherlands) Roderick Weusthof (SCHC)	27
2005–06	Bloemendaal (15)	Amsterdam (11)	(Netherlands) Roderick Weusthof (SCHC)	34
2006–07	Bloemendaal (16)	HGC (9)	(Germany) Christopher Zeller (Bloemendaal)	47
2007–08	Bloemendaal (17)	Amsterdam (12)	(Netherlands) Taeke Taekema (Amsterdam)	43
2008–09	Bloemendaal (18)	Amsterdam (13)	(Netherlands) Roderick Weusthof (SCHC)	34
2009–10	Bloemendaal (19)	HGC (10)	(England) Ashley Jackson (HGC)	29
2010–11	Amsterdam (20)	Bloemendaal (11)	(Netherlands) Taeke Taekema (Amsterdam)	27
2011–12	Amsterdam (21)	Rotterdam (1)	(Netherlands) Roderick Weusthof (Rotterdam)	34
2012–13	Rotterdam (1)	Oranje Zwart (4)	(Netherlands) Jeroen Hertzberger (Rotterdam)	26
2013–14	Oranje Zwart (2)	Bloemendaal (12)	(Netherlands) Mink van der Weerden (Oranje Zwart)	36
2014–15	Oranje Zwart (3)	Kampong (7)	(South Africa) Justin Reid-Ross (Amsterdam)	34
2015–16	Oranje Zwart (4)	Amsterdam (14)	(Argentina) Gonzalo Peillat (HGC)	33
2016–17	Kampong (7)	Rotterdam (2)	(Netherlands) Jeroen Hertzberger (Rotterdam)	28
2017–18	Kampong (8)	Amsterdam (15)	(Netherlands) Jeroen Hertzberger (Rotterdam)	28
2018–19	Bloemendaal (20)	Kampong (8)	(Netherlands) Jeroen Hertzberger (Rotterdam)	23
2019–20	Cancelled due to the COVID-19 pandemic in the Netherlands.		(Netherlands) Tim Swaen (Bloemendaal)	18
2020–21	Bloemendaal (21)	Kampong (9)	(Belgium) Alexander Hendrickx (Pinoké)	21
2021–22	Bloemendaal (22)	Pinoké (1)	(Belgium) Alexander Hendrickx (Pinoké)	25
2022–23	Pinoké (1)	Bloemendaal (13)	(Netherlands) Jeroen Hertzberger (Rotterdam)	32
2023–24	Kampong (9)	Rotterdam (3)	(Netherlands) Jip Janssen (Kampong)	24
2024–25	Amsterdam (22)	Kampong (10)	(Netherlands) Timo Boers (Den Bosch)	28
2025–26	Rotterdam (2)	Amsterdam (16)	(Netherlands) Timo Boers (Den Bosch)	31

== Champions ==
=== By club ===
Club	Championships	Runners-up	Seasons won
Amsterdam	22	16	1924–25, 1925–26, 1926–27, 1927–28, 1928–29, 1931–32, 1932–33, 1933–34, 1936–37, 1961–62, 1963–64, 1964–65, 1965–66, 1974–75, 1993–94, 1994–95, 1996–97, 2002–03, 2003–04, 2010–11, 2011–12, 2024–25
Bloemendaal	22	13	1918–19, 1919–20, 1920–21, 1921–22, 1922–23, 1985–86, 1986–87, 1987–88, 1988–89, 1990–91, 1992–93, 1998–99, 1999–2000, 2001–02, 2005–06, 2006–07, 2007–08, 2008–09, 2009–10, 2018–19, 2020–21, 2021–22
Kampong	9	10	1967–68, 1971–72, 1972–73, 1973–74, 1975–76, 1984–85, 2016–17, 2017–18, 2023-24
Venlo	8	10	1938–39, 1941–42, 1942–43, 1945–46, 1949–50, 1952–53, 1954–55, 1966–67
HDM	8	5	1923–24, 1929–30, 1930–31, 1934–35, 1935–36, 1940–41, 1941–42, 1991–92
Klein Zwitserland	8	2	1976–77, 1977–78, 1978–79, 1979–80, 1980–81, 1981–82, 1982–83, 1983–84
TOGO	7	2	1912–13, 1913–14, 1915–16, 1916–17, 1917–18, 1953–54, 1956–57
Oranje Zwart	4	4	2004–05, 2013–14, 2014–15, 2015–16
HHIJC	4	4	1947–48, 1948–49, 1950–51, 1951–52
Haarlemsche HBC	3	3	1899–1900, 1902–03, 1904–05
Laren	3	1	1955–56, 1960–61, 1968–69
De Musschen	3	1	1909–10, 1910–11, 1911–12
HGC	2	10	1989–90, 1995–96
HHV	2	3	1906–07, 1908–09
Rotterdam	2	3	2012–13, 2025–26
Den Bosch	2	2	1997–98, 2000–01
HMHC	2	2	1903–04, 1905–06
Haagsche HBC	2	1	1898–99, 1900–01
Tilburg	2	0	1959–60, 1969–70
HTCC	1	5	1970–71
Hilversum	1	1	1943–44
Pinoké	1	1	2022–23
SCHC	1	0	1958–59
DSHC	1	0	1957–58
BMHC	1	0	1937–38
ODIS	1	0	1907–08
Deventer	0	7	
PW	0	5	
Breda	0	3	
HOC	0	2	
DKS	0	1	
EMHC	0	1	
Gooi	0	1	
Hattem	0	1	

=== By province ===
Province	Championships	Runners-up	Winning clubs
North Holland	56	38	Bloemendaal (22), Amsterdam (22), Haarlemsche HBC (3), Laren (3), De Musschen (3), Hilversum (1), Pinoké (1), BMHC (1)
South Holland	39	34	HDM (8), Klein Zwitserland (8), TOGO (7), HHIJC (4), HGC (2), HHV (2), HMHC (2), Haagsche HBC (2), Rotterdam (2), DSHC (1), ODIS (1)
Utrecht	10	10	Kampong (9), SCHC (1)
North Brabant	9	15	Oranje Zwart (4), Den Bosch (2), Tilburg (2), HTCC (1)
Limburg	8	10	Venlo (8)
Overijssel	0	13	
Gelderland	0	1	

== Media coverage ==
Since 2015, almost every Sunday, one match from either the men's or the women's league is broadcast live by either Ziggo Sport or the NOS.

The 2025 finals were streamed live on the Tulp Hoofdklasse YouTube channel.

== See also ==
- Women's Hoofdklasse Hockey
