= Jonas de Geus =

Dutch field hockey player

Personal information
- Born: 29 April 1998 (age 28) Amsterdam, Netherlands
- Height: 1.89 m (6 ft 2 in)

Sport
- Sport: Field hockey
- Position: Midfielder
- Club: Kampong
Youth career
- Team
- –: Almere
Senior career
Years	Team	Caps	Goals
–2019	Almere	-	-
2019–present	Kampong	-	-
National team
Years	Team	Caps	Goals
2016	Netherlands U21	5	(0)
2017–present	Netherlands	127	(7)
Medal record
Men's field hockey
Representing the Netherlands
Olympic Games
Gold medal – first place	2024 Paris	Team
World Cup
Silver medal – second place	2018 Bhubaneswar
Bronze medal – third place	2023 Bhubaneswar–Rourkela
EuroHockey Championship
Gold medal – first place	2017 Amstelveen
Gold medal – first place	2021 Amstelveen
Gold medal – first place	2023 Mönchengladbach
Bronze medal – third place	2019 Antwerp
Champions Trophy
Bronze medal – third place	2018 Breda

Jonas de Geus (Dutch pronunciation: [ˈjoːnɑz də ˈɣøːs]; born 29 April 1998) is a Dutch professional field hockey player who plays as a midfielder for Kampong and the Dutch national team.

== Club career ==
De Geus started playing hockey at Almere where he went through all the youth ranks until he made his debut for the first team. In April 2019, he announced he would leave Almere at the end of the season. One month later he signed a four-year contract at Kampong. In the 2022–23 season he won the Golden Stick as the best player of the season.

== International career ==
In November 2016, de Geus was selected for the 2016 Junior World Cup, where the team finished seventh. He made his debut for the senior national team at the age of 18 in a test match against South Africa in 2017. He was part of the Dutch team that won the silver medal at the 2018 World Cup. In June 2019, he was selected in the Netherlands squad for the 2019 EuroHockey Championship. They won the bronze medal by defeating Germany 4–0. He was named the under-21 player of the tournament. In December 2019, he was nominated for the FIH Rising Star of the Year Award.
