= Pinoké =

Dutch field hockey club

- Full name: Pinoké
- League: Men's Hoofdklasse; Women's Hoofdklasse
- Founded: 23 January 1929; 97 years ago
- Home ground: Amsterdamse Bos, Amstelveen (Capacity 2,750)
- Website: Club website
Home	Away

Pinoké, also known as de Steekneuzen, is a Dutch field hockey club based in Amstelveen. It was founded on 23 January 1929, making it the second oldest hockey club in 'het Amsterdamse Bos'. Both the men's and the women's 1st XI compete in the Hoofdklasse Hockey, country's top-tier league.

The men's team came 2nd in the Hoofdklasse Hockey in the 2021-2022 season. Bloemendaal were the defending champions and they defended their title by defeating Pinoké 3–0 in the second match of the best of three series. In the 1st match, Bloemendaal tied 30 seconds before the end (3–3), after which Pinoké lost after shoot-outs.

As a result off the 2nd place in 2022, the men's team also made their debut in Euro Hockey League, where they defeated Slavia Prague 16–0 in their first match. Pinoké qualified for the final 8 and hosted the EHL Final8 2022–23 in the Wagener stadium.

The men's team won the Hoofdklasse Indoor Hockey in 2022, which means they participated in the Men's EuroHockey Indoor Club Trophy in 2023. In the 2022–23 season they reached the final for the second time and again against Bloemendaal, this time they won 5–1 on aggregate.

One year later, 2023, the women's team won the Hoofdklasse Indoor Hockey, allowing them to participate in the Women's EuroHockey Indoor Club Cup in 2024.

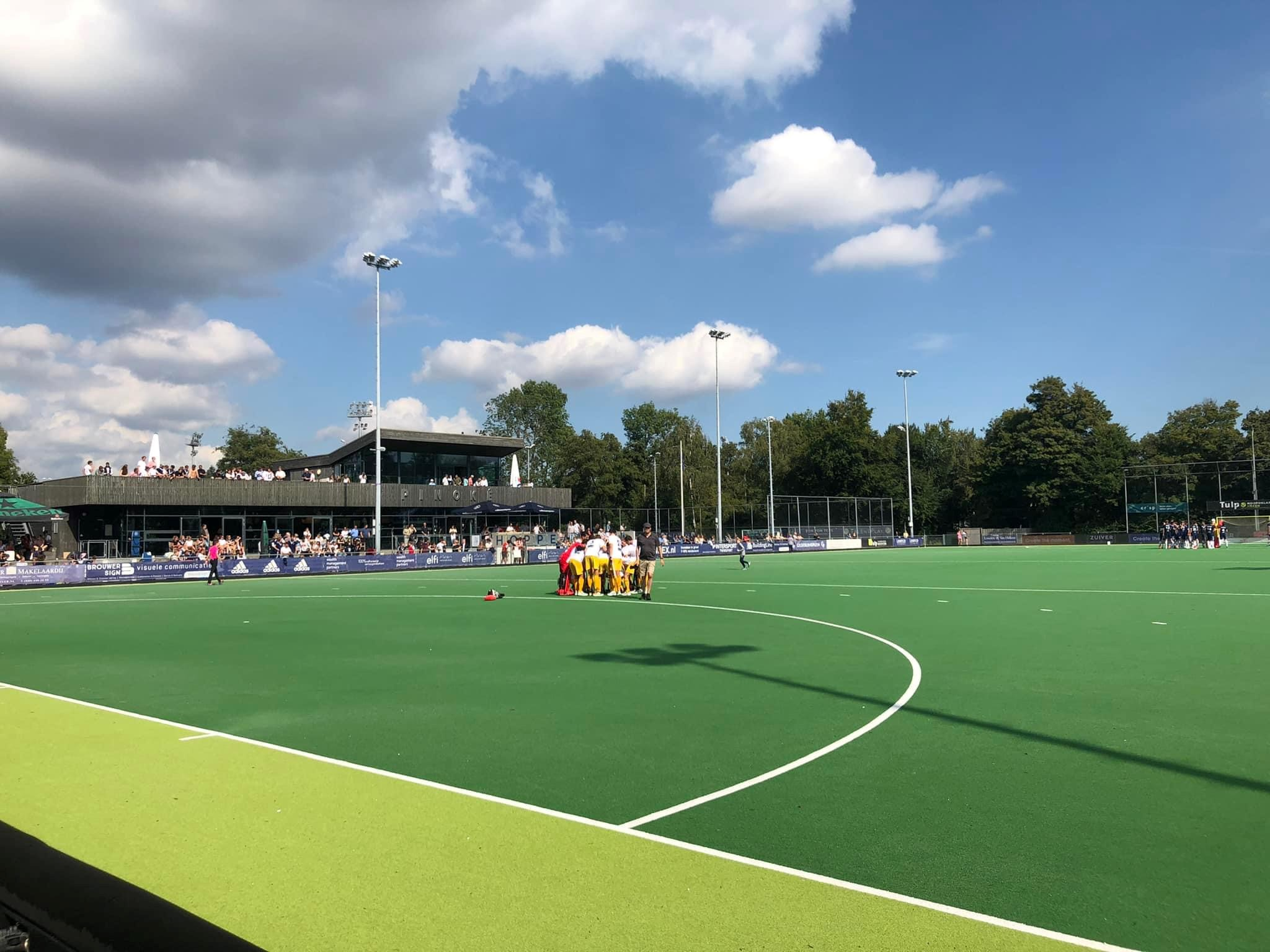
Pinoke Field in Amsterdamse Bos, Amstelveen

== Honours ==
=== Women ===
- National title / Hoofdklasse
  - Runners-up (1): 1976–77
- Hoofdklasse indoor
  - Winners (1): 2022–23
- EuroHockey Indoor Club Trophy
  - Winners (1): 2024

=== Men ===
- Hoofdklasse
  - Winners (1): 2022–23
  - Runners-up (1): 2021–22
- Euro Hockey League
  - Winners (1): 2023–24
- Hoofdklasse Indoor
  - Winners (1): 2021–22
- EuroHockey Indoor Club Trophy
  - Runners-up (1): 2023
- KNHB Gold Cup
  - Winners (1): 2018

== Men's squad ==
As of 13 September 2024

No.	Pos.	Nation	Player
1	GK	NED	Hidde Brink
2		NED	Pieter Sutorius
3	DF	ENG	Jack Waller
4	DF	NED	Tim Knapper
5	DF	NED	Niek Merkus
6	MF	NED	Jannis van Hattum (Captain)
7	MF	WAL	Jacob Draper
8	FW	BEL	Florent Van Aubel
9	FW	BEL	Sébastien Dockier
10	FW	NED	Boris Aardenburg
11	FW	NED	Miles Bukkens

No.	Pos.	Nation	Player
12	DF	NED	Daan Bonhof
13	FW	NED	Joep Troost
14		NED	Texas Bukkens
15		NED	Chiel van Oostendorp
16	FW	NED	Pepijn van der Valk
17		NED	Joppe Stappenbelt
18	DF	NED	Johannes Mooij
19	DF	GER	Luca Wolff
20		NED	Iwan Roukema
21	GK	NED	Ralph Grevenstuk
22	FW	NED	Danilo Trieling
