= 2023–24 Men's FIH Pro League =

Men's field hockey competition

- Dates: 6 December 2023 – 30 June 2024
- Teams: 9 (from 4 confederations)

Final positions
- Champions: Australia (2nd title)
- Runner-up: Netherlands
- Third place: Great Britain

Tournament statistics
- Matches played: 72
- Goals scored: 341 (4.74 per match)
- Top scorer: (Netherlands) Jip Janssen (15 goals)

The 2023–24 Men's FIH Pro League was the fifth edition of the Men's FIH Pro League, a field hockey championship for men's national teams. The tournament began on 6 December 2023 and finished on 30 June 2024.

Australia won the tournament for the second time and secured their participation in the 2026 World Cup.

== Format ==
The home and away principle was kept for the season, which was divided into date blocks. To assist with competition planning, international and national, several teams gathered in one venue to contest “mini-tournaments," wherein they each played two matches against one another.

If one of the two matches played between two teams was cancelled, the winner of the other match received double points.

This season winner earned direct qualification for the 2026 World Cup.

== Teams ==
Following the announcement of South Africa's withdrawal for this season after failing to secure a sponsor, Ireland joined despite finishing second in the 2022 Men's FIH Hockey Nations Cup.

- Argentina
- Australia
- Belgium
- Germany
- Great Britain
- India
- Ireland
- Netherlands
- Spain

== Results ==
=== Standings ===
Pos	Team	Pld	W	SOW	SOL	L	GF	GA	GD	Pts	Qualification or relegation
1st place, gold medalist(s)	Australia (C)	16	10	1	2	3	56	41	+15	34	Qualified for the 2026 FIH World Cup
2nd place, silver medalist(s)	Netherlands (Note: Belgium and the Netherlands were already qualified for the 2026 FIH World Cup as hosts.)	16	8	2	3	3	45	32	+13	31	
3rd place, bronze medalist(s)	Great Britain	16	9	0	2	5	37	28	+9	29	
4	Argentina	16	7	3	2	4	39	35	+4	29	
5	Belgium	16	7	2	0	7	41	39	+2	25	
6	Germany	16	5	4	2	5	33	29	+4	25	
7	India	16	5	3	3	5	38	35	+3	24	
8	Spain	16	4	0	1	11	36	43	−7	13	
9	Ireland (Note: Ireland would have been relegated, but they remained in the next edition of the Pro League following the withdrawal of New Zealand.)	16	2	0	0	14	16	59	−43	6	

Source: FIH
Rules for classification: 1) points; 2) matches won; 3) goal difference; 4) goals for; 5) head-to-head result; 6) field goals scored.
(C) Champion

=== Fixtures ===
All times are local.

6 December 2023
21:30

Argentina	2–1	Great Britain
Mazzilli 11'; Domene 41'	Report	Ward 60'

Polideportivo Provincial, Santiago del Estero
Umpires:
Germán Montes de Oca (ARG)
Gabriel Labate (ARG)

7 December 2023
21:30

Great Britain	3–2	Netherlands
Walker 15', 55'; Bandurak 28'	Report	Croon 17'; Janssen 32'

Polideportivo Provincial, Santiago del Estero
Umpires:
Federico Silva (ARG)
Ayanna McClean (TTO)

8 December 2023
21:30

Argentina	0–3	Netherlands
	Report	Pieters 12'; T. Brinkman 32'; T. Reyenga 55'

Polideportivo Provincial, Santiago del Estero
Umpires:
Germán Montes de Oca (ARG)
Federico Silva (ARG)

9 December 2023
21:30

Argentina	1–1	Great Britain
Martínez 24'	Report	Draper 12'
Penalties
Keenan (penalty shoot-out scored); Domene (penalty shoot-out scored); Casella (penalty shoot-out scored); Martins (penalty shoot-out scored)	4–1	(penalty shoot-out scored) Albery; (penalty shoot-out missed) Wallace; (penalty shoot-out missed) Morton

Polideportivo Provincial, Santiago del Estero
Umpires:
Gabriel Labate (ARG)
Federico Silva (ARG)

10 December 2023
21:30

Netherlands	2–1	Great Britain
Pieters 42'; Troost 60'	Report	Ward 47'

Polideportivo Provincial, Santiago del Estero
Umpires:
Gabriel Labate (ARG)
Irene Presenqui (ARG)

11 December 2023
21:30

Argentina	3–3	Netherlands
Casella 18'; Della Torre 37'; Domene 60'	Report	Van Heijningen 35'; T. Brinkman 51'; J. Brinkman 56'
Penalties
Keenan (penalty shoot-out scored); Domene (penalty shoot-out missed); L. Toscani (penalty shoot-out scored); Martins (penalty shoot-out scored); Martínez (penalty shoot-out scored); L. Toscani (penalty shoot-out scored); Martins (penalty shoot-out missed); Domene (penalty shoot-out missed); Martínez (penalty shoot-out scored); Keenan (penalty shoot-out missed); L. Toscani (penalty shoot-out missed)	6–7	(penalty shoot-out scored) Croon; (penalty shoot-out missed) Burkhardt; (penalty shoot-out scored) T. Brinkman; (penalty shoot-out scored) Pieters; (penalty shoot-out scored) Bijen; (penalty shoot-out scored) Croon; (penalty shoot-out missed) T. Brinkman; (penalty shoot-out missed) Pieters; (penalty shoot-out scored) Bijen; (penalty shoot-out missed) Burkhardt; (penalty shoot-out scored) Croon

Polideportivo Provincial, Santiago del Estero
Umpires:
Germán Montes de Oca (ARG)
Gabriel Labate (ARG)

10 February 2024
17:30

Ireland	1–5	Netherlands
Cole 36'	Report	Hoedemakers 12'; Croon 21'; Janssen 35', 52'; Van Heijningen 53'

Kalinga Stadium, Bhubaneswar
Umpires:
Raghu Prasad (IND)
James Unkles (AUS)

10 February 2024
19:30

India	4–1	Spain
Harmanpreet 7', 20'; Jugraj 24'; Lalit 50'	Report	Miralles 34'

Kalinga Stadium, Bhubaneswar
Umpires:
Rawi Anbananthan (MAS)
Zeke Newman (AUS)

11 February 2024
17:30

Spain	3–4	Australia
Miralles 29'; N. Álvarez 36'; Cabré-Verdiell 37'	Report	Sharp 8', 52'; Whetton 19'; Govers 25'

Kalinga Stadium, Bhubaneswar
Umpires:
Raghu Prasad (IND)
Liu Xiaoying (CHN)

11 February 2024
19:30

India	2–2	Netherlands
Hardik 13'; Harmanpreet 58'	Report	Janssen 30'; Bijen 39'
Penalties
Harmanpreet (penalty shoot-out scored); Sukhjeet (penalty shoot-out scored); Lalit (penalty shoot-out scored); Shamsher (penalty shoot-out scored)	4–2	(penalty shoot-out missed) Croon; (penalty shoot-out scored) T. Brinkman; (penalty shoot-out missed) De Geus; (penalty shoot-out scored) Bijen

Kalinga Stadium, Bhubaneswar
Umpires:
James Unkles (AUS)
Zeke Newman (AUS)

13 February 2024
17:30

Australia	5–0	Ireland
Craig 17'; Hayward 22'; Willott 25', 57'; Ephraums 43'	Report

Kalinga Stadium, Bhubaneswar
Umpires:
Raghu Prasad (IND)
Rawi Anbananthan (MAS)

13 February 2024
19:30

Netherlands	3–0	Spain
Janssen 15', 51'; Telgenkamp 26'	Report

Kalinga Stadium, Bhubaneswar
Umpires:
James Unkles (AUS)
Zeke Newman (AUS)

14 February 2024
19:00

Argentina	4–1	Belgium
Keenan 15', 59'; Casella 31'; Della Torre 49'	Report	T. Stockbroekx 48'

Polideportivo Provincial, Santiago del Estero
Umpires:
Sean Rapaport (RSA)
Tyler Klenk (CAN)

15 February 2024
17:30

Spain	4–2	Ireland
González 13', 57'; Miralles 18'; Reyné 41'	Report	Nelson 24'; Cole 52'

Kalinga Stadium, Bhubaneswar
Umpires:
Rawi Anbananthan (MAS)
James Unkles (AUS)

15 February 2024
19:00

Belgium	0–2	Germany
	Report	Hellwig 19'; Mazkour 25'

Polideportivo Provincial, Santiago del Estero
Umpires:
Benjamin Peters (USA)
Sean Rapaport (RSA)

15 February 2024
19:30

India	4–6	Australia
Harmanpreet 12', 20'; Sukhjeet 18'; Mandeep 29'	Report	Govers 13', 13'; Zalewski 40'; Sharp 52'; Anderson 55'; Welch 58'

Kalinga Stadium, Bhubaneswar
Umpires:
Raghu Prasad (IND)
Zeke Newman (AUS)

16 February 2024
17:30

Netherlands	4–5	Australia
Telgenkamp 6'; Bijen 12', 22'; Janssen 56'	Report	Govers 33', 53'; Hayward 40', 48'; Brand 60'

Kalinga Stadium, Bhubaneswar
Umpires:
Rawi Anbananthan (MAS)
Raghu Prasad (IND)

16 February 2024
19:00

Argentina	1–1	Germany
Casella 60'	Report	Hellwig 53'
Penalties
Keenan (penalty shoot-out scored); Domene (penalty shoot-out missed); L. Toscani (penalty shoot-out scored); Casella (penalty shoot-out scored)	3–1	(penalty shoot-out missed) Wellen; (penalty shoot-out scored) M. Grambusch; (penalty shoot-out missed) Hellwig; (penalty shoot-out missed) Große

Polideportivo Provincial, Santiago del Estero
Umpires:
Tyler Klenk (CAN)
Benjamin Peters (USA)

16 February 2024
19:30

India	1–0	Ireland
Gurjant 60'	Report

Kalinga Stadium, Bhubaneswar
Umpires:
Liu Xiaoying (CHN)
Zeke Newman (AUS)

17 February 2024
19:00

Argentina	3–4	Belgium
Domene 30+', 58'; Casella 47'	Report	Willems 9'; Duvekot 19'; Hellin 36'; T. Stockbroekx 47'

Polideportivo Provincial, Santiago del Estero
Umpires:
Sean Rapaport (RSA)
Benjamin Peters (USA)

18 February 2024
19:00

Germany	3–2	Belgium
Weigand 7', 25'; T. Grambusch 19'	Report	Wilbers 26'; Willems 42'

Polideportivo Provincial, Santiago del Estero
Umpires:
Irene Presenqui (ARG)
Benjamin Peters (USA)

19 February 2024
17:30

Ireland	1–2	Netherlands
Nelson 12'	Report	Janssen 15', 23'

Birsa Munda International Hockey Stadium, Rourkela
Umpires:
Martin Madden (SCO)
Kristy Robertson (AUS)

19 February 2024
19:00

Argentina	2–2	Germany
Della Torre 3'; Domene 13'	Report	Hartkopf 27'; Mazkour 34'
Penalties
Keenan (penalty shoot-out missed); Della Torre (penalty shoot-out scored); L. Toscani (penalty shoot-out scored); Casella (penalty shoot-out scored); Martínez (penalty shoot-out scored)	4–3	(penalty shoot-out scored) Wellen; (penalty shoot-out missed) Prinz; (penalty shoot-out scored) Mazkour; (penalty shoot-out scored) M. Grambusch; (penalty shoot-out missed) Hellwig

Polideportivo Provincial, Santiago del Estero
Umpires:
Sean Rapaport (RSA)
Tyler Klenk (CAN)

19 February 2024
19:30

India	2–2	Spain
Jarmanpreet 1'; Abhishek 35'	Report	Basterra 3'; Lacalle 15'
Penalties
Harmanpreet (penalty shoot-out scored); Sukhjeet (penalty shoot-out scored); Lalit (penalty shoot-out scored); Abhishek (penalty shoot-out scored); Raj (penalty shoot-out scored); Harmanpreet (penalty shoot-out scored); Sukhjeet (penalty shoot-out scored); Lalit (penalty shoot-out scored)	8–7	(penalty shoot-out scored) Basterra; (penalty shoot-out scored) Miralles; (penalty shoot-out scored) Bonastre; (penalty shoot-out scored) Reyné; (penalty shoot-out scored) Recasens; (penalty shoot-out scored) Bonastre; (penalty shoot-out scored) Recasens; (penalty shoot-out missed) Miralles

Birsa Munda International Hockey Stadium, Rourkela
Umpires:
Gareth Greenfield (NZL)
David Tomlinson (NZL)

21 February 2024
17:30

Spain	1–4	Australia
Amat 2'	Report	Ogilvie 4'; Ephraums 8'; Hayward 25'; Brand 44'

Birsa Munda International Hockey Stadium, Rourkela
Umpires:
Gareth Greenfield (NZL)
Junko Wagatsuma (JPN)

21 February 2024
19:30

India	1–1	Netherlands
Hardik 38'	Report	Middendorp 4'
Penalties
Araijeet (penalty shoot-out scored); Sukhjeet (penalty shoot-out missed); Lalit (penalty shoot-out scored); Shamsher (penalty shoot-out missed)	2–4	(penalty shoot-out scored) Croon; (penalty shoot-out scored) T. Brinkman; (penalty shoot-out missed) De Geus; (penalty shoot-out scored) Telgenkamp; (penalty shoot-out scored) De Mol

Birsa Munda International Hockey Stadium, Rourkela
Umpires:
David Tomlinson (NZL)
Martin Madden (SCO)

22 February 2024
17:30

Ireland	1–4	Australia
O'Donoghue 44'	Report	Govers 33', 52'; Ephraums 40'; Welch 56'

Birsa Munda International Hockey Stadium, Rourkela
Umpires:
Junko Wagatsuma (JPN)
David Tomlinson (NZL)

22 February 2024
19:30

Netherlands	4–3	Spain
Janssen 11', 31'; T. Brinkman 22'; Jansen 34'	Report	Lacalle 2'; Cabré-Verdiell 51'; Basterra 54'

Birsa Munda International Hockey Stadium, Rourkela
Umpires:
Martin Madden (SCO)
Gareth Greenfield (NZL)

24 February 2024
17:30

Spain	7–0	Ireland
Basterra 3'; Iglesias 14', 31', 50'; Ignacio-Simó 35'; Lacalle 47'; Reyné 51'	Report

Birsa Munda International Hockey Stadium, Rourkela
Umpires:
Kristy Robertson (AUS)
Gareth Greenfield (NZL)

24 February 2024
19:30

India	2–2	Australia
Harmanpreet 20'; Amit 29'	Report	Govers 23'; Craig 53'
Penalties
Akashdeep (penalty shoot-out missed); Sukhjeet (penalty shoot-out missed); Lalit (penalty shoot-out missed)	0–3	(penalty shoot-out scored) Brand; (penalty shoot-out scored) Ogilvie; (penalty shoot-out scored) Wickham

Birsa Munda International Hockey Stadium, Rourkela
Umpires:
Martin Madden (SCO)
David Tomlinson (NZL)

25 February 2024
17:30

Australia	3–5	Netherlands
Anderson 6'; Brand 46'; Hayward 55'	Report	Telgenkamp 13', 20'; Janssen 35'; Hoedemakers 42'; Pieters 48'

Birsa Munda International Hockey Stadium, Rourkela
Umpires:
Martin Madden (SCO)
Gareth Greenfield (NZL)

25 February 2024
19:30

India	4–0	Ireland
Nilakanta 14'; Akashdeep 15'; Gurjant 38'; Jugraj 60'	Report

Birsa Munda International Hockey Stadium, Rourkela
Umpires:
David Tomlinson (NZL)
Kristy Robertson (AUS)

22 May 2024
14:30

India	2–2	Argentina
Mandeep 11'; Lalit 55'	Report	Martínez 20'; Domene 60'
Penalties
Harmanpreet (penalty shoot-out scored); Sukhjeet (penalty shoot-out scored); Raj (penalty shoot-out missed); Abhishek (penalty shoot-out scored); Harmanpreet (penalty shoot-out scored); Sukhjeet (penalty shoot-out scored); Lalit (penalty shoot-out missed)	5–4	(penalty shoot-out scored) Casella; (penalty shoot-out scored) L. Toscani; (penalty shoot-out scored) Martins; (penalty shoot-out missed) Martínez; (penalty shoot-out scored) Casella; (penalty shoot-out missed) L. Toscani; (penalty shoot-out missed) Capurro

Wilrijkse Plein Antwerp, Antwerp
Umpires:
Jonas van't Hek (NED)
Sean Edwards (ENG)

22 May 2024
19:00

Belgium	1–2	Ireland
Hainaut 55'	Report	Nelson 11'; Cole 20'

Wilrijkse Plein Antwerp, Antwerp
Umpires:
Sarah Wilson (SCO)
Raphaël Adrien (GER)

23 May 2024
16:30

Argentina	3–1	Ireland
Martínez 30', 43'; Capurro 47'	Report	Madeley 51'

Wilrijkse Plein Antwerp, Antwerp
Umpires:
Jonas van't Hek (NED)
Ole Ingwersen (GER)

23 May 2024
21:00

Belgium	4–1	India
Denayer 22'; Hendrickx 34', 60'; Charlier 49'	Report	Abhishek 55'

Wilrijkse Plein Antwerp, Antwerp
Umpires:
Ben Göntgen (GER)
Sean Edwards (ENG)

25 May 2024
16:15

Belgium	2–2	India
Denayer 30'; Van Aubel 50'	Report	Araijeet 11'; Sukhjeet 57'
Penalties
Boccard (penalty shoot-out scored); De Sloover (penalty shoot-out missed); Van Aubel (penalty shoot-out scored); Ghislain (penalty shoot-out scored)	3–1	(penalty shoot-out missed) Araijeet; (penalty shoot-out scored) Sukhjeet; (penalty shoot-out missed) Abhishek; (penalty shoot-out missed) Prasad

Wilrijkse Plein Antwerp, Antwerp
Umpires:
Jonas van't Hek (NED)
Sean Edwards (ENG)

25 May 2024
18:30

Ireland	3–4	Argentina
Madeley 14', 20'; A. Empey 40'	Report	Capurro 19'; Domene 28'; Keenan 39'; Habif 53'

Wilrijkse Plein Antwerp, Antwerp
Umpires:
Ben Göntgen (GER)
Annelize Rostron (RSA)

26 May 2024
16:15

Belgium	1–4	Ireland
Kina 9'	Report	Johnson 17', 31'; Duncan 45'; Walker 55'

Wilrijkse Plein Antwerp, Antwerp
Umpires:
Sarah Wilson (SCO)
Sean Edwards (ENG)

26 May 2024
18:30

Argentina	4–5	India
Monja 3'; Keenan 24'; Marcucci 54'; Martínez 57'	Report	Araijeet 7'; Gurjant 18'; Harmanpreet 29', 50', 52'

Wilrijkse Plein Antwerp, Antwerp
Umpires:
Ben Göntgen (GER)
Raphaël Adrien (GER)

29 May 2024
14:00

Spain	2–3	Argentina
Fortuño 52'; Cabré-Verdiell 57'	Report	Casella 19', 48'; Domene 59'

Wilrijkse Plein Antwerp, Antwerp
Umpires:
Jonas van 't Hek (NED)
Raphaël Adrien (GER)

29 May 2024
19:00

Belgium	5–1	Australia
Denayer 8', 29'; Hendrickx 18'; Onana 36'; Stockbroekx 48'	Report	Sharp 15'

Wilrijkse Plein Antwerp, Antwerp
Umpires:
Ben Göntgen (GER)
Ole Ingwersen (GER)

30 May 2024
16:30

Australia	1–2	Argentina
Brand 7'	Report	Della Torre 31'; L. Toscani 40'

Wilrijkse Plein Antwerp, Antwerp
Umpires:
Sean Edwards (ENG)
Raphaël Adrien (GER)

30 May 2024
21:15

Belgium	3–2	Spain
Dohmen 41'; Luypaert 44'; Hendrickx 55'	Report	Pe. Cunill 35'; Sanz 42'

Wilrijkse Plein Antwerp, Antwerp
Umpires:
Jonas van't Hek (NED)
Alison Keogh (IRL)

1 June 2024
10:00

Germany	0–3	India
	Report	Harmanpreet 16'; Sukhjeet 41'; Gurjant 44'

Lee Valley Hockey and Tennis Centre, London
Umpires:
Coen van Bunge (NED)
Ahmed El-Sayed (EGY)

1 June 2024
12:15

Great Britain	5–1	Ireland
Croft 12'; Roper 18'; Ward 27', 34'; Furlong 58'	Report	Walker 20'

Lee Valley Hockey and Tennis Centre, London
Umpires:
Sébastien Michielsen (BEL)
Michiel Otten (NED)

1 June 2024
14:00

Belgium	4–1	Spain
Hendrickx 1'; Van Aubel 17', 58'; Stockbroekx 23'	Report	Álvarez 55'

Wilrijkse Plein Antwerp, Antwerp
Umpires:
Ben Göntgen (GER)
Annelize Rostron (RSA)

1 June 2024
18:30

Argentina	3–4	Australia
Mazzilli 11'; Tarazona 12'; Domene 53'	Report	Wickham 3'; Craig 49'; Hayward 57'; Govers 60'

Wilrijkse Plein Antwerp, Antwerp
Umpires:
Alison Keogh (IRL)
Sean Edwards (ENG)

2 June 2024
10:00

Ireland	0–7	Germany
	Report	Mazkour 17'; Hellwig 28', 52'; Miltkau 29', 32'; Herzbruch 42'; Prinz 54'

Lee Valley Hockey and Tennis Centre, London
Umpires:
Martin Madden (SCO)
Laurine Delforge (BEL)

2 June 2024
12:15

Great Britain	3–1	India
Bandurak 2', 11'; Calnan 47'	Report	Abhishek 35'

Lee Valley Hockey and Tennis Centre, London
Umpires:
Sébastien Michielsen (BEL)
Coen van Bunge (NED)

2 June 2024
16:15

Belgium	4–4	Australia
Boon 13'; De Kerpel 42'; Hendrickx 43'; Van Aubel 58'	Report	Govers 12'; Whetton 14'; Ephraums 19'; Sharp 51'
Penalties
Boccard (penalty shoot-out scored); Van Aubel (penalty shoot-out missed); Wegnez (penalty shoot-out scored); De Kerpel (penalty shoot-out scored)	3–2	(penalty shoot-out scored) Brand; (penalty shoot-out scored) Ogilvie; (penalty shoot-out missed) Govers; (penalty shoot-out missed) Sharp; (penalty shoot-out missed) Craig

Wilrijkse Plein Antwerp, Antwerp
Umpires:
Jonas van't Hek (NED)
Raphaël Adrien (GER)

2 June 2024
20:45

Spain	1–2	Argentina
Curiel 52'	Report	Capurro 20'; Della Torre 41'

Wilrijkse Plein Antwerp, Antwerp
Umpires:
Sarah Wilson (SCO)
Sean Edwards (ENG)

5 June 2024
13:15

Great Britain	4–1	Spain
Furlong 3', 45'; Ward 17'; Rushmere 27'	Report	Bonastre 52'

Lee Valley Hockey and Tennis Centre, London
Umpires:
Michiel Otten (NED)
Ahmed El-Sayed (EGY)

5 June 2024
17:45

Ireland	0–3	Germany
	Report	Herzbruch 36'; Peillat 43'; Prinz 60'

Lee Valley Hockey and Tennis Centre, London
Umpires:
Martin Madden (SCO)
Sébastien Michielsen (BEL)

6 June 2024
14:15

Germany	0–3	Spain
	Report	Basterra 11', 40', 49'

Lee Valley Hockey and Tennis Centre, London
Umpires:
Coen Van Bunge (NED)
Michiel Otten (NED)

6 June 2024
20:00

Great Britain	3–0	Ireland
Ward 12', 22'; Roper 14'	Report

Lee Valley Hockey and Tennis Centre, London
Umpires:
Laurine Delforge (BEL)
Ivona Makar (CRO)

8 June 2024
14:30

Great Britain	2–3	Australia
Furlong 7'; Wallace 15'	Report	Govers 11', 40'; Wickham 27'

Lee Valley Hockey and Tennis Centre, London
Umpires:
Coen van Bunge (NED)
Laurine Delforge (BEL)

8 June 2024
17:15

India	2–3	Germany
Harmanpreet 19'; Sukhjeet 48'	Report	Peillat 2', 33'; Rühr 10'

Lee Valley Hockey and Tennis Centre, London
Umpires:
Martin Madden (SCO)
Ahmed El-Sayed (EGY)

9 June 2024
14:30

Great Britain	3–2	India
Roper 1'; Waller 37'; Forsyth 50'	Report	Sukhjeet 19'; Harmanpreet 36'

Lee Valley Hockey and Tennis Centre, London
Umpires:
Michiel Otten (NED)
Ahmed El-Sayed (EGY)

9 June 2024
17:15

Australia	2–2	Germany
Craig 12'; Brand 44'	Report	Große 33'; Peillat 35'
Penalties
Brand (penalty shoot-out scored); Ogilvie (penalty shoot-out missed); Govers (penalty shoot-out scored); Wickham (penalty shoot-out missed); Harvie (penalty shoot-out scored); Brand (penalty shoot-out scored); Ogilvie (penalty shoot-out missed)	4–5	(penalty shoot-out missed) H. Müller; (penalty shoot-out scored) Struthoff; (penalty shoot-out scored) Prinz; (penalty shoot-out scored) Hartkopf; (penalty shoot-out missed) Weigand; (penalty shoot-out scored) Prinz; (penalty shoot-out scored) Hartkopf

Lee Valley Hockey and Tennis Centre, London
Umpires:
Martin Madden (SCO)
Coen van Bunge (NED)

11 June 2024
11:00

Great Britain	2–1	Spain
Williamson 45'; Forsyth 50'	Report	Miralles 49'

Lee Valley Hockey and Tennis Centre, London
Umpires:
Sébastien Michielsen (BEL)
Coen van Bunge (NED)

11 June 2024
15:30

Germany	2–3	Australia
Ludwig 11'; Peillat 35'	Report	Whetton 28'; Howard 56'; Ockenden 59'

Lee Valley Hockey and Tennis Centre, London
Umpires:
Martin Madden (SCO)
Ahmed El-Sayed (EGY)

12 June 2024
12:00

Germany	2–4	Spain
Peillat 19'; Hartkopf 58'	Report	Miralles 9'; Reyné 28', 48'; Iglesias 40'

Lee Valley Hockey and Tennis Centre, London
Umpires:
Martin Madden (SCO)
Sébastien Michielsen (BEL)

12 June 2024
17:45

Great Britain	1–5	Australia
Morton 2'	Report	Whetton 1'; Welch 29'; Willott 35', 51'; Craig 45'

Lee Valley Hockey and Tennis Centre, London
Umpires:
Michiel Otten (NED)
Coen van Bunge (NED)

23 June 2024
13:30

Great Britain	1–3	Belgium
Ansell 33'	Report	Wegnez 17'; Hendrickx 30', 37'

SV Kampong, Utrecht
Umpires:
Wanri Venter (RSA)
Jonas van't Hek (NED)

23 June 2024
16:00

Netherlands	2–2	Germany
Janssen 35'; Bijen 56'	Report	Hellwig 14'; Weigand 49'
Penalties
Croon (penalty shoot-out scored); T. Brinkman (penalty shoot-out scored); De Geus (penalty shoot-out scored); Van Dam (penalty shoot-out missed); De Mol (penalty shoot-out scored); Croon (penalty shoot-out missed); T. Brinkman (penalty shoot-out missed)	4–5	(penalty shoot-out missed) Wellen; (penalty shoot-out scored) H. Müller; (penalty shoot-out scored) Große; (penalty shoot-out scored) Prinz; (penalty shoot-out scored) Weigand; (penalty shoot-out missed) Wellen; (penalty shoot-out scored) H. Müller

SV Kampong, Utrecht
Umpires:
Ayden Shrives (RSA)
Rachel Williams (ENG)

24 June 2024
17:30

Germany	0–1	Great Britain
	Report	Wallace 23'

SV Kampong, Utrecht
Umpires:
Ayden Shrives (RSA)
Jonas van't Hek (NED)

25 June 2024
20:00

Netherlands	3–1	Belgium
Janssen 41'; Reyenga 45'; De Mol 51'	Report	Boon 18'

SV Kampong, Utrecht
Umpires:
Jonas van 't Hek (NED)
Rachel Williams (ENG)

27 June 2024
16:30

Great Britain	3–1	Belgium
Wallace 3'; Ward 20', 58'	Report	Hendrickx 22'

Wagener Stadium, Amstelveen
Umpires:
Wanri Venter (RSA)
Coen van Bunge (NED)

27 June 2024
19:00

Netherlands	1–1	Germany
Janssen 26'	Report	Wellen 46'
Penalties
T. Brinkman (penalty shoot-out missed); De Geus (penalty shoot-out scored); Bijen (penalty shoot-out missed); Telgenkamp (penalty shoot-out missed)	1–3	(penalty shoot-out scored) Wellen; (penalty shoot-out missed) Rühr; (penalty shoot-out scored) H. Müller; (penalty shoot-out scored) Prinz

Wagener Stadium, Amstelveen
Umpires:
Ayden Shrives (RSA)
Rachel Williams (ENG)

28 June 2024
16:30

Germany	3–3	Great Britain
Wellen 3', 25'; Peillat 56'	Report	Roper 15'; Ward 21', 32'
Penalties
Wellen (penalty shoot-out scored); H. Müller (penalty shoot-out scored); M. Grambusch (penalty shoot-out missed); Prinz (penalty shoot-out scored); Große (penalty shoot-out scored)	4–2	(penalty shoot-out scored) Williamson; (penalty shoot-out scored) Wallace; (penalty shoot-out missed) Morton; (penalty shoot-out missed) Roper

Wagener Stadium, Amstelveen
Umpires:
Coen van Bunge (NED)
Wanri Venter (RSA)

30 June 2024
15:00

Netherlands	3–5	Belgium
T. Brinkman 13', 15'; Pieters 46'	Report	Stockbroekx 1'; De Kerpel 12'; Hendrickx 27'; Luypaert 39'; Onana 58'

Wagener Stadium, Amstelveen
Umpires:
Coen van Bunge (NED)
Ayden Shrives (RSA)

== Goalscorers ==
There were 341 goals scored in 72 matches, for an average of 4.74 goals per match.

15 goals

- (Netherlands) Jip Janssen

12 goals

- (Australia) Blake Govers
- (India) Harmanpreet Singh

11 goals

- (United Kingdom) Sam Ward

10 goals

- (Belgium) Alexander Hendrickx

9 goals

- (Argentina) Tomás Domene

7 goals

- (Germany) Gonzalo Peillat

6 goals

- (Argentina) Maico Casella
- (Australia) Jeremy Hayward
- (Spain) José Basterra

5 goals

- (Argentina) Nicolás Della Torre
- (Argentina) Lucas Martínez
- (Australia) Tim Brand
- (Australia) Thomas Craig
- (Australia) Lachlan Sharp
- (Belgium) Thibeau Stockbroekx
- (Germany) Malte Hellwig
- (India) Sukhjeet Singh
- (Netherlands) Thierry Brinkman
- (Spain) Marc Miralles

4 goals

- (Argentina) Nicolás Keenan
- (Australia) Nathan Ephraums
- (Australia) Jacob Whetton
- (Australia) Ky Willott
- (Belgium) Florent Van Aubel
- (Belgium) Félix Denayer
- (Netherlands) Terrance Pieters
- (United Kingdom) Gareth Furlong
- (United Kingdom) Phil Roper
- (India) Gurjant Singh
- (Netherlands) Koen Bijen
- (Netherlands) Duco Telgenkamp
- (Spain) Álvaro Iglesias
- (Spain) Marc Reyné

3 goals

- (Argentina) Bautista Capurro
- (Australia) Jack Welch
- (Germany) Elian Mazkour
- (Germany) Justus Weigand
- (Germany) Niklas Wellen
- (United Kingdom) Nick Bandurak
- (United Kingdom) Zach Wallace
- (India) Abhishek
- (Ireland) Lee Cole
- (Ireland) Luke Madeley
- (Ireland) Matthew Nelson
- (Spain) Pol Cabré-Verdiell
- (Spain) Borja Lacalle

2 goals

- (Argentina) Agustín Mazzilli
- (Australia) Jacob Anderson
- (Australia) Tom Wickham
- (Belgium) Tom Boon
- (Belgium) Nicolas De Kerpel
- (Belgium) Loïck Luypaert
- (Belgium) Nelson Onana
- (Belgium) Tommy Willems
- (Germany) Raphael Hartkopf
- (Germany) Timm Herzbruch
- (Germany) Marco Miltkau
- (Germany) Thies Prinz
- (United Kingdom) Alan Forsyth
- (United Kingdom) Struan Walker
- (India) Araijeet Singh Hundal
- (India) Hardik Singh
- (India) Jugraj Singh
- (India) Mandeep Singh
- (India) Lalit Upadhyay
- (Ireland) Benjamin Johnson
- (Ireland) Benjamin Walker
- (Netherlands) Jorrit Croon
- (Netherlands) Steijn van Heijningen
- (Netherlands) Tjep Hoedemakers
- (Netherlands) Tijmen Reyenga
- (Spain) Nicolás Álvarez
- (Spain) Enrique González

1 goal

- (Argentina) Thomas Habif
- (Argentina) Tadeo Marcucci
- (Argentina) Federico Monja
- (Argentina) Santiago Tarazona
- (Argentina) Lucas Toscani
- (Australia) Timothy Howard
- (Australia) Edward Ockenden
- (Australia) Flynn Ogilvie
- (Australia) Aran Zalewski
- (Belgium) Cédric Charlier
- (Belgium) John-John Dohmen
- (Belgium) Roman Duvekot
- (Belgium) Guillermo Hainaut
- (Belgium) Guillaume Hellin
- (Belgium) Antoine Kina
- (Belgium) Victor Wegnez
- (Belgium) Jeremy Wilbers
- (Germany) Tom Grambusch
- (Germany) Johannes Große
- (Germany) Moritz Ludwig
- (Germany) Christopher Rühr
- (United Kingdom) Liam Ansell
- (United Kingdom) Will Calnan
- (United Kingdom) Henry Croft
- (United Kingdom) Jacob Draper
- (United Kingdom) Lee Morton
- (United Kingdom) Stuart Rushmere
- (United Kingdom) Jack Waller
- (United Kingdom) Conor Williamson
- (India) Amit Rohidas
- (India) Nilakanta Sharma
- (India) Akashdeep Singh
- (India) Jarmanpreet Singh
- (Ireland) Jeremy Duncan
- (Ireland) Alistair Empey
- (Ireland) Shane O'Donoghue
- (Netherlands) Jasper Brinkman
- (Netherlands) Guus Jansen
- (Netherlands) Floris Middendorp
- (Netherlands) Joep de Mol
- (Netherlands) Joep Troost
- (Spain) Pere Amat
- (Spain) Jordi Bonastre
- (Spain) Pepe Cunill
- (Spain) César Curiel
- (Spain) Guillermo Fortuño
- (Spain) Antonio Sanz
- (Spain) Eduard de Ignacio-Simó

Source: FIH

== See also ==
- 2023–24 Women's FIH Pro League
