= 2019–2021 Feldhockey-Bundesliga =

Bundesliga
- Season: 2019–2021
- Dates: 7 September 2019 – 9 May 2021
- Champions: Rot-Weiss Köln (9th title)
- Regular season: Rot-Weiss Köln
- Relegated: Großflottbek; Crefelder HTC
- Euro Hockey League: Rot-Weiss Köln; Uhlenhorst Mülheim
- EHL Ranking Cup: Mannheimer HC
- Matches: 161
- Goals: 795 (4.94 per match)
- Top goalscorer: Michael Körper (36 goals)
- Biggest home win: Uhlenhorst Mülheim 10–0 Nürnberger HTC
- Biggest away win: Großflottbek 1–9 Harvestehuder THC
- Highest scoring: TSV Mannheim 8–5 Nürnberger HTC

The 2019–20 Bundesliga was the 78th season of the Bundesliga, Germany's premier field hockey league. It began on 7 September 2019 and it concluded with the championship final on 24 May 2019 in Mannheim. Due to the COVID-19 pandemic the league was suspended on 13 March until 1 April 2020. The season returned on 2 September 2020 and was extended into 2021 with an extra round of matches.

For the 2019–20 season, the German Hockey Federation introduced a new format. The league was played by twelve teams grouped in two pools of six (Pool A and Pool B) based on the previous season's ranking. The teams of the same pool competed 2 times and faced the teams of the other pool once. The first four of each pool were qualified for the play-offs and the last two of each pool played the play-downs.

Uhlenhorst Mülheim are the two-time defending champions.

== Teams ==
2019–2021 Feldhockey-Bundesliga teams
Location of Hamburg teams

A total of 12 teams participated in the 2019–2021 edition of the Bundesliga. The promoted teams were Großflottbek and TSV Mannheim who replaced Düsseldorfer HC and Blau-Weiss Berlin.

Team	Location	State
Berliner HC	Berlin	Berlin
Club an der Alster	Hamburg	Hamburg
Crefelder HTC	Krefeld	North Rhine-Westphalia
Großflottbek	Hamburg	Hamburg
Hamburger Polo Club	Hamburg	Hamburg
Harvestehuder THC	Hamburg	Hamburg
Mannheimer HC	Mannheim	Baden-Württemberg
Nürnberger HTC	Nuremberg	Bavaria
Rot-Weiss Köln	Cologne	North Rhine-Westphalia
TSV Mannheim	Mannheim	Baden-Württemberg
UHC Hamburg	Hamburg	Hamburg
Uhlenhorst Mülheim	Mülheim	North Rhine-Westphalia

=== Number of teams by state ===
State	Number of teams	Clubs
Hamburg	5	Club an der Alster, Großflottbek, Hamburger Polo Club, Harvestehuder THC and UHC Hamburg
North Rhine-Westphalia	3	Crefelder HTC, Rot-Weiss Köln and Uhlenhorst Mülheim
Baden-Württemberg	2	Mannheimer HC and TSV Mannheim
Berlin	1	Berliner HC
Bavaria	1	Nürnberger HTC
Total	12	

== Regular season ==
=== Pool A ===
Pos	Team	Pld	W	D	L	GF	GA	GD	Pts	Qualification or relegation
1	Uhlenhorst Mülheim	27	16	7	4	105	44	+61	55	Qualification for the play-offs
2	UHC Hamburg	27	12	7	8	65	64	+1	43	Qualification for the play-offs
3	Harvestehuder THC	27	12	6	9	88	73	+15	42	Qualification for the play-offs
4	Club an der Alster	27	11	5	11	59	66	−7	38	Qualification for the play-offs
5	Crefelder HTC	27	8	2	17	54	72	−18	26	Qualification for the play-downs
6	Großflottbek	27	3	4	20	38	104	−66	13	Qualification for the play-downs

Source: hockey.de

=== Pool B ===
Pos	Team	Pld	W	D	L	GF	GA	GD	Pts	Qualification or relegation
1	Rot-Weiss Köln	26	18	5	3	87	45	+42	59	Qualification for the play-offs
2	Mannheimer HC	27	15	6	6	82	41	+41	51	Qualification for the play-offs
3	Berliner HC	27	15	5	7	74	51	+23	50	Qualification for the play-offs
4	Hamburger Polo Club	27	14	5	8	66	48	+18	47	Qualification for the play-offs
5	TSV Mannheim	27	5	3	19	53	91	−38	18	Qualification for the play-downs
6	Nürnberger HTC	26	2	5	19	30	102	−72	11	Qualification for the play-downs

Source: hockey.de

=== Overall table ===
The leading team in this table qualifies for the Euro Hockey League.

Pos	Team	Pld	W	D	L	GF	GA	GD	Pts	Qualification
1	Rot-Weiss Köln	26	18	5	3	87	45	+42	59	2022 Euro Hockey League
2	Uhlenhorst Mülheim	27	16	7	4	105	44	+61	55	2022 Euro Hockey League
3	Mannheimer HC	27	15	6	6	82	41	+41	51	2022 Euro Hockey League Ranking Cup
4	Berliner HC	27	15	5	7	74	51	+23	50	
5	Hamburger Polo Club	27	14	5	8	66	48	+18	47	
6	UHC Hamburg	27	12	7	8	65	64	+1	43	
7	Harvestehuder THC	27	12	6	9	88	73	+15	42	
8	Club an der Alster	27	11	5	11	59	66	−7	38	
9	Crefelder HTC	27	8	2	17	54	72	−18	26	
10	TSV Mannheim	27	5	3	19	53	91	−38	18	
11	Großflottbek	27	3	4	20	38	104	−66	13	
12	Nürnberger HTC	26	2	5	19	30	102	−72	11	

Source: TheSports.org

=== Results ===
==== Matches 1–22 ====
Home \ Away	BHC	ALS	CRE	GFB	HPC	HAR	MHC	NÜR	RWK	TSV	UHC	UHL
Berliner HC	—	1–2	3–1	7–0	1–0	1–2	2–4	5–0	1–5	5–1	0–2	4–4
Club an der Alster	0–3	—	2–3	3–1	3–5	1–2	1–5	4–3	3–5	4–2	2–2	1–3
Crefelder HTC	1–3	2–2	—	2–0	2–3	3–1	5–4	3–1	1–3	3–1	4–0	0–3
Großflottbek	0–5	2–3	4–2	—	1–1	1–9	1–6	1–1	1–3	6–1	0–5	3–3
Hamburger Polo Club	3–2	4–1	4–2	3–2	—	3–0	0–1	6–0	2–0	5–2	3–3	3–2
Harvestehuder THC	4–6	2–3	4–3	6–3	5–2	—	3–3	7–0	2–2	2–2	0–3	2–2
Mannheimer HC	0–1	0–2	3–1	3–0	2–0	6–4	—	4–1	3–3	7–0	3–2	2–3
Nürnberger HTC	2–2	3–3	1–3	1–1	3–2	2–3	0–6	—	3–4	1–0	0–2	0–7
Rot-Weiss Köln	2–2	2–2	4–2	3–1	2–1	6–4	2–1	2–1	—	2–0	7–1	3–2
TSV Mannheim	2–2	5–1	1–0	2–1	1–1	4–6	1–4	8–5	4–7	—	4–5	1–5
UHC Hamburg	4–5	2–1	2–2	6–2	0–5	1–1	2–2	2–2	3–2	2–1	—	2–4
Uhlenhorst Mülheim	2–2	2–0	3–2	10–1	1–1	7–2	2–2	10–0	3–1	8–0	1–3	—

Source: TheSports.org
Legend: Blue = home team win; Yellow = draw; Red = away team win.

==== Matches 23–27 ====
Pool A

Home \ Away	ALS	CRE	GFB	HAR	UHC	UHL
Club an der Alster	—	3–2	—	—	—	2–1
Crefelder HTC	—	—	1–3	1–6	—	—
Großflottbek	0–4	—	—	—	2–3	—
Harvestehuder THC	1–3	—	5–1	—	2–0	—
UHC Hamburg	3–3	4–2	—	—	—	1–4
Uhlenhorst Mülheim	—	4–1	5–1	4–4	—	—

Source: TheSports.org
Legend: Blue = home team win; Yellow = draw; Red = away team win.

Pool B

Home \ Away	BHC	HPC	MHC	NÜR	RWK	TSV
Berliner HC	—	—	3–2	—	—	2–1
Hamburger Polo Club	2–3	—	1–1	—	—	3–2
Mannheimer HC	—	—	—	6–0	1–1	—
Nürnberger HTC	0–2	1–3	—	—	—	—
Rot-Weiss Köln	5–1	6–0	—	—	—	—
TSV Mannheim	—	—	0–1	5–0	1–4	—

Source: TheSports.org
Legend: Blue = home team win; Yellow = draw; Red = away team win.

=== Top goalscorers ===
As of 17 April 2021

Rank	Player	Club	FG	PC	PS	Goals
1	(Austria) Michael Körper	Harvestehuder THC	14	21	1	36
2	(Argentina) Gonzalo Peillat	Mannheimer HC	0	28	4	32
3	(Germany) Malte Hellwig	Uhlenhorst Mülheim	25	1	0	26
4	(Germany) Martin Häner	Berliner HC	0	21	1	22
4	(Germany) Christopher Rühr	Rot-Weiss Köln	10	7	4	21
6	(Germany) Constantin Staib	Hamburger Polo Club	14	3	1	18
7	(Germany) Timm Herzbruch	Uhlenhorst Mülheim	10	2	4	16
7	(Germany) Lukas Windfeder	Uhlenhorst Mülheim	5	11	0	16
9	(Germany) Philip Schlageter	TSV Mannheim	6	9	0	15
10	(Germany) Niklas Bruns	Club an der Alster	6	6	1	13
10	(Germany) Tino Kossel	Crefelder HTC	0	13	0	13

== Play-downs ==
=== Overview ===
The play-downs were played in a best of three format with the first match hosted by the weaker-placed team on 25 April and the return match and potential third decisive match hosted by the better placed team on 1 and 2 May respectively.

Team 1	Series	Team 2	Game 1	Game 2	Game 3
TSV Mannheim	2–0	Großflottbeker THGC	1–0	6–0	
Crefelder HTC	1–2	Nürnberger HTC	2–2 (2–4 p.s.o.)	3–2	1–1 (2–4 p.s.o.)

=== Matches ===
25 April 2021
13:00

Großflottbeker THGC	0–1	TSV Mannheim
	Report	Dehoff 37'

Großflottbeker THGC, Hamburg

1 May 2021
13:00

TSV Mannheim	6–0	Großflottbeker THGC
Schlageter 21'; Haber 26'; Holzhauser 46'; Weiher 53'; Röthlander 58'; Proske 59'	Report

TSV Mannheim Hockey, Mannheim

TSV Mannheim won series 2–0 and stay in the Bundesliga while Großflottbeker THGC are relegated to the 2. Bundesliga.

25 April 2021
12:00

Nürnberger HTC	2–2	Crefelder HTC
F. Wolff 29'; Mechtold 36'	Report	Kossol 54'; Eschler 56'
Penalties
Wesley (penalty shoot-out scored); Mechtold (penalty shoot-out scored); F. Wolff (penalty shoot-out missed); Haustein (penalty shoot-out scored); Bechhold (penalty shoot-out scored)	4–2	(penalty shoot-out missed) Eschler; (penalty shoot-out scored) Ehling; (penalty shoot-out scored) Bachmann; (penalty shoot-out missed) Michler

Nürnberger HTC, Nuremberg

1 May 2021
15:00

Crefelder HTC	3–2	Nürnberger HTC
Kossol 1'; Westphal 43', 52'	Report	Benke 58'; Wesley 60'

Gerd-Wellen-Hockeyanlage, Krefeld

2 May 2021
13:00

Crefelder HTC	1–1	Nürnberger HTC
Jansen 20'	Report	Benke 56'
Penalties
Ehling (penalty shoot-out scored); Michler (penalty shoot-out missed); Bachmann (penalty shoot-out scored); Deecke (penalty shoot-out missed)	2–4	(penalty shoot-out scored) Wesley; (penalty shoot-out missed) Mechtold; (penalty shoot-out scored) F. Wolff; (penalty shoot-out scored) Benke; (penalty shoot-out scored) Jordan

Gerd-Wellen-Hockeyanlage, Krefeld

Nürnberger HTC won series 2–1 and stay in the Bundesliga while Crefelder HTC are relegated to the 2. Bundesliga.

== Play-offs ==
The quarter-finals were played in a best of three format with the first match hosted by the weaker-placed team on 25 April and the return match and potential third decisive match hosted by the better placed team on 1 and 2 May respectively. The semi-finals and final were hosted by Mannheimer HC in Mannheim, Baden-Württemberg.

=== Bracket ===
Quarter-finals
Rot-Weiss Köln	2	4
Club an der Alster	0	1
UHC Hamburg	0	1 (2)
Berliner HC	3	1 (3)
Uhlenhorst Mülheim	1	6
Hamburger Polo Club	0	4
Mannheimer HC	1	4
Harvestehuder THC	0	2

Semi-finals
8 May – Mannheim
Rot-Weiss Köln	6
Berliner HC	4
8 May – Mannheim
Uhlenhorst Mülheim (s.o.)	2 (4)
Mannheimer HC	2 (3)

Final
9 May – Mannheim
Rot-Weiss Köln	1
Uhlenhorst Mülheim	0

=== Quarter-finals ===
24 April 2021
13:00

Club an der Alster	0–2	Rot-Weiss Köln
	Report	Van der Weerden 30'; Rühr 43'

Club an der Alster, Hamburg

1 May 2021
13:00

Rot-Weiss Köln	4–1	Club an der Alster
Rühr 8'; Prinz 11'; Van der Weerden 39'; Oruz 49'	Report	Alt 46'

Stadium Rot-Weiss, Cologne

Rot-Weiss Köln won series 2–0.

24 April 2021
13:00

Hamburger Polo Club	0–1	Uhlenhorst Mülheim
	Report	Meyer 9'

Kunstrasenplatz Polo, Hamburg

1 May 2021
13:00

Uhlenhorst Mülheim	6–4	Hamburger Polo Club
Windfeder 3', 9', 36', 46', 52'; Hellwig 60'	Report	Russell 15'; Procházka 23', 41'; Staib 35'

Uhlenhorst Mülheim, Mülheim

Uhlenhorst Mülheim won series 2–0.

25 April 2021
12:00

Harvestehuder THC	0–1	Mannheimer HC
	Report	Peillat 45'

HTHC Voßberg, Hamburg

1 May 2021
12:30

Mannheimer HC	4–2	Harvestehuder THC
Schöllkopf 11'; Zmyslony 34'; Peillat 50'; T. Nguyen 60'	Report	Pöhling 12'; Heuer 21'

Mannheimer HC, Mannheim

Mannheimer HC won series 2–0.

24 April 2021
15:00

Berliner HC	3–0	UHC Hamburg
Gomoll 31', 55'; Neßelhauf 52'	Report

Ernst-Reuter Platz, Berlin

1 May 2021
15:30

UHC Hamburg	1–1	Berliner HC
Schwarzhaupt 52'	Report	Neßelhauf 39'
Penalties
Struthoff (penalty shoot-out scored); Harms (penalty shoot-out scored); H. Schmid (penalty shoot-out missed); Müller (penalty shoot-out missed); Kutter (penalty shoot-out missed)	2–3	(penalty shoot-out scored) Klink; (penalty shoot-out scored) Poljaric; (penalty shoot-out missed) Dösch; (penalty shoot-out missed) Lehmann-Richter; (penalty shoot-out scored) Zwicker

UHC Hamburg, Hamburg

Berliner HC won series 2–0.

=== Semi-finals ===
8 May 2021
16:00

Rot-Weiss Köln	6–4	Berliner HC
Prinz 11', 19'; Rühr 48', 50'; Adrians 49'; Mazkour 58'	Report	Häner 16'; Neßelhauf 23'; Gomoll 39', 47'

Mannheimer HC, Mannheim

8 May 2021
19:00

Uhlenhorst Mülheim	2–2	Mannheimer HC
Hellwig 13', 44'	Report	Peillat 14', 57'
Penalties
Herzbruch (penalty shoot-out scored); Hellwig (penalty shoot-out scored); Fürk (penalty shoot-out missed); Schiffer (penalty shoot-out scored); Matania (penalty shoot-out missed); Herzbruch (penalty shoot-out scored)	4–3	(penalty shoot-out scored) Hinrichs; (penalty shoot-out scored) Hartkopf; (penalty shoot-out missed) Weigand; (penalty shoot-out scored) Müller; (penalty shoot-out missed) Barreiros; (penalty shoot-out missed) Hinrichs

Mannheimer HC, Mannheim

=== Final ===
9 May 2021
16:00

Rot-Weiss Köln	1–0	Uhlenhorst Mülheim
Mazkour 38'	Report

Mannheimer HC, Mannheim
