= 2022 Men's Euro Hockey League =

15th season of the Euro Hockey League

2022 Euro Hockey League
Tournament details
- Host country: Netherlands
- City: Amstelveen
- Dates: 13–18 April
- Teams: 10 (from 7 associations)
- Venue: Wagener Stadium

Final positions
- Champions: (Netherlands) Bloemendaal (5th title)
- Runner-up: (Germany) Rot-Weiss Köln
- Third place: (England) Surbiton

Tournament statistics
- Matches played: 13
- Goals scored: 57 (4.38 per match)
- Top scorer(s): (Spain) Pau Cunill (England) Luke Taylor (4 goals)

The 2022 Men's Euro Hockey League was the 15th season of the Euro Hockey League, Europe's men's premier club field hockey tournament, organized by the European Hockey Federation.

It took place alongside the women's tournament at the Wagener Stadium in Amstelveen, Netherlands from 13 to 18 April 2022. Due to the delayed 2021 edition of the Euro Hockey League, only 12 teams participated in this edition. The remaining eight teams played in the 2022 Euro Hockey League Ranking Cup.

Bloemendaal were the defending champions. They defended their title by defeating Rot-Weiss Köln 4–0 in the final. Bloemendaal became the first club to successfully defend their Euro Hockey League title. Surbiton won the bronze medal by defeating Club de Campo 2–1 and became the first English club in 11 years to win an EHL medal.

== Association team allocation ==
A total of 12 teams from 9 of the 45 EHF member associations would participate in the 2022 Euro Hockey League. The association ranking based on the EHL country coefficients was used to determine the number of participating teams for each association:

- Associations 1–3 each had two teams qualify.
- Associations 4–9 each had one team qualify.

=== Association ranking ===
For the 2022 Euro Hockey League, the associations are allocated places according to their 2020 EHL country coefficients, which takes into account their performance in European competitions from 2018–19 to 2020–21.

Association ranking for the 2022 Euro Hockey League

| Rank | Association | Points | Teams |
|---|---|---|---|
| 1 | Germany | 37.583 | 3 |
| 2 | Netherlands | 36.500 | 3 |
| 3 | Spain | 33.625 | 3 |
| 4 | Belgium | 32.750 | 2 |
| 5 | England | 25.375 | 2 |
| 6 | Austria | 21.813 | 2 |
| 7 | France | 20.000 | 1 |
| 8 | Belarus | 19.813 | 1 |
| 9 | Russia | 19.688 | 1 |
| 10 | Scotland | 14.188 | 1 |

| Rank | Association | Points | Teams |
|---|---|---|---|
| 11 | Ireland | 12.750 | 1 |
| 12 | Switzerland | 9.063 | 0 |
| 13 | Wales | 7.688 | 0 |
| 14 | Ukraine | 6.813 | 0 |
| 15 | Poland | 6.438 | 0 |
| 16 | Italy | 5.750 | 0 |
| 17 | Czech Republic | 5.625 | 0 |
| 18 | Portugal | 5.375 | 0 |
| 19 | Denmark | 3.625 | 0 |
| 20 | Croatia | 1.625 | 0 |

=== Teams ===
The labels in the parentheses show how each team qualified for the place of its starting round:

- 1st, 2nd, 3rd: League positions of the previous season
- Abd-: League positions of the abandoned season due to the COVID-19 pandemic in Europe as determined by the national association.

Qualified teams for 2022 Euro Hockey League
| Entry round | Teams | |
|---|---|---|
| Quarter-finals | (Germany) Rot-Weiss Köln (1st) | (Netherlands) Bloemendaal (1st) |
| Quarter-finals | (Spain) Club de Campo (1st) | (Belgium) Dragons (1st) |
| Preliminary round | (Germany) Uhlenhorst Mülheim (2nd) | (Netherlands) Kampong (2nd) |
| Preliminary round | (Spain) Atlètic Terrassa (2nd) | (England) Surbiton (Abd-1st) |
| Preliminary round | (Austria) Arminen (1st) | (France) Saint Germain (1st) |
| Preliminary round | (Belarus) Minsk (1st) | (Russia) Dinamo Ak-Bars (1st) |
| Euro Hockey League Ranking Cup | (Germany) Mannheimer HC (3rd) | (Netherlands) Rotterdam (3rd) |
| Euro Hockey League Ranking Cup | (Spain) Club Egara (3rd) | (Belgium) Waterloo Ducks (2nd) |
| Euro Hockey League Ranking Cup | (England) Hampstead (Abd-2nd) | (Austria) Post SV (2nd) |
| Euro Hockey League Ranking Cup | (Scotland) Grange (1st) | (Ireland) Three Rock Rovers |

== Results ==
The draw took place on 30 November 2021. The schedule was released on 8 December 2021.

=== Bracket ===
Preliminary round
13 April
(Netherlands) Kampong | 4
(Germany) Uhlenhorst Mülheim | 0
13 April
(France) Saint Germain | 2
(England) Surbiton | 7
(Belarus) Minsk
(Austria) Arminen | w/o
(Spain) Atlètic Terrassa | w/o
(Russia) Dinamo Ak-Bars

Quarter-finals
15 April
(Germany) Rot-Weiss Köln | 2
(Netherlands) Kampong | 1
15 April
(England) Surbiton | 1
(Belgium) Dragons | 0
14 April
(Spain) Club de Campo | 3
(Austria) Arminen | 0
14 April
(Spain) Atlètic Terrassa | 1
(Netherlands) Bloemendaal | 3

Semi-finals
17 April
(Germany) Rot-Weiss Köln | 5
(England) Surbiton | 1
16 April
(Spain) Club de Campo | 0
(Netherlands) Bloemendaal | 3

Final
18 April
(Germany) Rot-Weiss Köln | 0
(Netherlands) Bloemendaal | 4
Bronze medal match
18 April
(England) Surbiton | 2
(Spain) Club de Campo | 1

=== Preliminary round ===
On 1 March 2022, following the Russian invasion of Ukraine, EHF excluded Russian and Belarusian clubs from all competitions.

13 April 2022

| Minsk (Belarus) | w/o | (Austria) Arminen |
|---|---|---|
| | Report |

13 April 2022

| Atlètic Terrassa (Spain) | w/o | (Russia) Dinamo Ak-Bars |
|---|---|---|
| | Report |

13 April 2022
16:15

| Saint Germain (France) | 2–7 | (England) Surbiton |
|---|---|---|
| Semenol 33'; Jouin 60+' | Report | L. Taylor 1', 14'; Boon 25', 45'; Ja. Gall 27'; Goodfield 30'; Middleton 43' |

Umpires:
Michelle Meister (GER)
Tim Meissner (GER)

13 April 2022
18:30

| Kampong (Netherlands) | 4–0 | (Germany) Uhlenhorst Mülheim |
|---|---|---|
| Janssen 8'; Van Bijnen 10'; Gruter 32'; Lageman 43' | Report |

Umpires:
Laurine Delforge (BEL)
Sean Edwards (ENG)

=== Quarter-finals ===
14 April 2022
14:45

| Club de Campo (Spain) | 3–0 | (Austria) Arminen |
|---|---|---|
| Abajo 25'; Tello 27'; Puglisi 40' | Report |

Umpires:
Xavier Fenaert (FRA)
Paul van den Assum (NED)

14 April 2022
19:15

| Atlètic Terrassa (Spain) | 1–3 | (Netherlands) Bloemendaal |
|---|---|---|
| Cabré-Verdiel 55' | Report | T. Brinkman 19'; Swaen 30'; Fuchs 59' |

Umpires:
Martin Madden (SCO)
Sebastien Michielsen (BEL)

15 April 2022
13:45

| Surbiton (England) | 1–0 | (Belgium) Dragons |
|---|---|---|
| L. Taylor 39' | Report |

Umpires:
Tim Meissner (GER)
Paul van den Assum (NED)

15 April 2022
20:30

| Rot-Weiss Köln (Germany) | 2–1 | (Netherlands) Kampong |
|---|---|---|
| T. Grambusch 26'; Van der Weerden 41' | Report | Janssen 59' |

Umpires:
Martin Madden (SCO)
Sarah Wilson (SCO)

=== Ranking matches ===
14 April 2022
17:00

| Saint Germain (France) | 1–3 | (Germany) Uhlenhorst Mülheim |
|---|---|---|
| Perrin 19' | Report | Ludwig 28'; Hellwig 32', 46' |

Umpires:
Shane O'Donnell (IRL)
Sarah Wilson (SCO)

16 April 2022
18:15

| Arminen (Austria) | 2–7 | (Spain) Atlètic Terrassa |
|---|---|---|
| Uher 13', 59' | Report | Pa. Cunill 11', 11', 24', 33'; Cabré-Verdiel 35'; Malgosa 39'; Pe. Cunill 55' |

Umpires:
Shane O'Donnell (IRL)
Paul van den Assum (NED)

17 April 2022
16:15

| Kampong (Netherlands) | 2–2 | (Belgium) Dragons |
|---|---|---|
| Gruter 36'; Janssen 46' | Report | Denayer 20'; Della Torre 35' |
Penalties
| De Geus (penalty shoot-out missed); Lageman (penalty shoot-out missed); Pieters (penalty shoot-out scored); De Vilder (penalty shoot-out missed) | 1–3 | (penalty shoot-out scored) Denayer; (penalty shoot-out missed) Raes; (penalty shoot-out scored) Rubens; (penalty shoot-out missed) Della Torre; (penalty shoot-out scored) Martínez |

Umpires:
Tim Meissner (GER)
Shane O'Donnell (IRL)

=== Semi-finals ===
16 April 2022
16:00

| Club de Campo (Spain) | 0–3 | (Netherlands) Bloemendaal |
|---|---|---|
| | Report | Croon 1'; Swaen 7'; T. Brinkman 33' |

Umpires:
Sean Edwards (ENG)
Martin Madden (SCO)

17 April 2022
14:00

| Rot-Weiss Köln (Germany) | 5–1 | (England) Surbiton |
|---|---|---|
| Siegburg 5', 12'; Rühr 5', 27'; M. Grambusch 35' | Report | L. Taylor 52' |

Umpires:
Laurine Delforge (BEL)
Sebastien Michielsen (BEL)

=== Bronze medal match ===
18 April 2022
11:30

| Surbiton (England) | 2–1 | (Spain) Club de Campo |
|---|---|---|
| Goodfield 18'; Furlong 27' | Report | Rodríguez 51' |

Umpires:
Michelle Meister (GER)
Paul van den Assum (NED)

=== Final ===
18 April 2022
16:15

| Rot-Weiss Köln (Germany) | 0–4 | (Netherlands) Bloemendaal |
|---|---|---|
| | Report | Croon 17'; Fuchs 24'; J. Brinkman 56'; Bovendeert 56' |

Umpires:
Martin Madden (SCO)
Sarah Wilson (SCO)

== Statistics ==
=== Final standings ===
- 1. (Netherlands) Bloemendaal
- 2. (Germany) Rot-Weiss Köln
- 3. (England) Surbiton
- 4. (Spain) Club de Campo
- 5. (Belgium) Dragons
- 5. (Spain) Atlètic Terrassa
- 7. (Netherlands) Kampong
- 7. (Austria) Arminen
- 9. (Germany) Uhlenhorst Mülheim
- 11. (France) Saint Germain

=== Top goalscorers ===
| Rank | Player | Team | FG | PC | PS | Goals |
|---|---|---|---|---|---|---|
| 1 | (Spain) Pau Cunill | (Spain) Atlètic Terrassa | 0 | 4 | 0 | 4 |
| 1 | (England) Luke Taylor | (England) Surbiton | 0 | 4 | 0 | 4 |
| 3 | (Netherlands) Jip Janssen | (Netherlands) Kampong | 0 | 3 | 0 | 3 |

== See also ==
- 2022 Men's EuroHockey Club Trophy I
- 2022 Men's EuroHockey Indoor Club Cup
- 2022 Women's Euro Hockey League
