= 2020–21 Men's Belgian Hockey League =

Belgian Hockey League
- Season: 2020–21
- Dates: 11 September 2020 – 9 May 2021
- Champions: Dragons (12th title)
- Relegated: Namur; Old Club
- Euro Hockey League: Dragons
- EHL Ranking Cup: Waterloo Ducks
- Matches played: 155
- Goals scored: 858 (5.54 per match)
- Top goalscorer: Tom Boon (34 goals)
- Biggest home win: Léopold 11–1 Namur
- Biggest away win: Old Club 1–11 Gantoise
- Highest scoring: Racing 10–3 Old Club

The 2020–21 Men's Belgian Hockey League was the 101st season of the Men's Belgian Hockey League, the top men's Belgian field hockey league. The season began on 11 September 2020 and ended on 9 May 2021 with the second match of the championship final in Antwerp.

Dragons won their 12th title by defeating the Waterloo Ducks 4–3 and 2–1 in the final series. The defending champions Léopold, finished in third place.

== Teams ==
2020–21 Men's Belgian Hockey League teams
Location of Brussels teams in the 2020–21 Men's Belgian Hockey League

| Team | Location | Province |
|---|---|---|
| Antwerp | Sint-Job-in-'t-Goor | Antwerp |
| Beerschot | Kontich | Antwerp |
| Braxgata | Boom | Antwerp |
| Daring | Molenbeek-Saint-Jean | Brussels |
| Dragons | Brasschaat | Antwerp |
| Gantoise | Ghent | East Flanders |
| Herakles | Lier | Antwerp |
| Léopold | Uccle | Brussels |
| Leuven | Heverlee | Flemish Brabant |
| Namur | Saint-Servais | Namur |
| Old Club | Liège | Liège |
| Orée | Woluwe-Saint-Pierre | Brussels |
| Racing | Uccle | Brussels |
| Waterloo Ducks | Waterloo | Walloon Brabant |

=== Number of teams by provinces ===
| Province | Number of teams | Team(s) |
|---|---|---|
| Antwerp | 5 | Antwerp, Beerschot, Braxgata, Dragons, Herakles |
| Brussels | 4 | Daring, Léopold, Orée, Racing |
| East Flanders | 1 | Gantoise |
| Flemish Brabant | 1 | Leuven |
| Liège | 1 | Old Club |
| Namur | 1 | Namur |
| Walloon Brabant | 1 | Waterloo Ducks |
| Total | 14 | |

== Regular season ==
=== Standings ===
| Pos | Team | Pld | W | D | L | GF | GA | GD | Pts | Qualification |
|---|---|---|---|---|---|---|---|---|---|---|
| 1 | Gantoise | 13 | 12 | 1 | 0 | 57 | 13 | +44 | 37 | Play-offs |
| 2 | Waterloo Ducks | 13 | 10 | 2 | 1 | 52 | 20 | +32 | 32 | Play-offs |
| 3 | Orée | 13 | 10 | 0 | 3 | 39 | 23 | +16 | 30 | Play-offs |
| 4 | Léopold | 13 | 8 | 2 | 3 | 55 | 27 | +28 | 26 | Play-offs |
| 5 | Dragons | 13 | 7 | 2 | 4 | 40 | 27 | +13 | 23 | Play-offs |
| 6 | Leuven | 13 | 6 | 4 | 3 | 33 | 28 | +5 | 22 | Play-offs |
| 7 | Beerschot | 13 | 6 | 2 | 5 | 42 | 29 | +13 | 20 | Play-offs |
| 8 | Racing | 13 | 6 | 0 | 7 | 34 | 23 | +11 | 18 | Play-offs |
| 9 | Herakles | 13 | 5 | 1 | 7 | 28 | 27 | +1 | 16 | Play-downs |
| 10 | Braxgata | 13 | 4 | 2 | 7 | 31 | 41 | −10 | 14 | Play-downs |
| 11 | Daring | 13 | 2 | 4 | 7 | 27 | 39 | −12 | 10 | Play-downs |
| 12 | Antwerp | 13 | 3 | 1 | 9 | 29 | 42 | −13 | 10 | Play-downs |
| 13 | Namur | 13 | 1 | 1 | 11 | 18 | 80 | −62 | 4 | Play-downs |
| 14 | Old Club | 13 | 0 | 0 | 13 | 20 | 86 | −66 | 0 | Play-downs |

Source: Flashscore

=== Results ===
| Home \ Away | ANT | BEE | BRA | DAR | DRA | GAN | HER | LÉO | LEU | NAM | OLD | ORÉ | RAC | WAT |
|---|---|---|---|---|---|---|---|---|---|---|---|---|---|---|
| Antwerp | — | 2–2 | — | — | 2–4 | — | — | 3–5 | — | 5–1 | 5–2 | 0–1 | — | 2–6 |
| Beerschot | — | — | — | 3–3 | 2–3 | — | — | 1–3 | — | 9–0 | 8–1 | 1–4 | — | 4–3 |
| Braxgata | 3–1 | 1–3 | — | — | — | — | 2–3 | 1–4 | 1–3 | — | — | — | 2–0 | — |
| Daring | 1–5 | — | 2–2 | — | — | 0–3 | 3–1 | — | 2–2 | — | 2–0 | — | 2–3 | — |
| Dragons | — | — | 2–2 | 7–3 | — | 2–4 | 4–2 | — | 1–3 | — | 5–1 | — | 2–1 | — |
| Gantoise | 6–2 | 4–1 | 9–2 | — | — | — | 2–1 | — | 5–0 | — | — | — | 2–1 | — |
| Herakles | 2–1 | 1–4 | — | — | — | — | — | 2–1 | — | 7–3 | — | 1–2 | 0–1 | — |
| Léopold | — | — | — | 4–3 | 2–2 | 0–3 | — | — | — | 11–1 | — | 6–3 | — | 3–4 |
| Leuven | 3–1 | 3–2 | — | — | — | — | 1–1 | 3–3 | — | — | — | 2–3 | 1–3 | — |
| Namur | — | — | 3–5 | 3–3 | 0–6 | 0–2 | — | — | 2–5 | — | — | — | — | 1–7 |
| Old Club | — | — | 2–6 | — | — | 1–11 | 1–7 | 1–9 | 3–6 | 2–3 | — | 2–5 | — | — |
| Orée | — | — | 3–2 | 3–1 | 2–1 | 0–3 | — | — | — | 11–0 | — | — | — | 0–3 |
| Racing | 6–0 | 1–2 | — | — | — | — | — | 0–4 | — | 7–1 | 10–3 | 1–2 | — | 0–2 |
| Waterloo Ducks | — | — | 6–2 | — | 3–1 | 3–3 | 2–0 | — | 1–1 | — | 9–1 | 3–2 | — | — |

Source: Flashscore
Legend: Blue = home team win; Yellow = draw; Red = away team win.

== Play-downs ==
The points obtained during the regular season were halved before the start of the play-downs. As a result, the teams started with the following points before the play-downs: Herakles 8 points, Braxgata 7, Antwerp 5, Daring 5, Namur 2 and Old Club 0.

| Pos | Team | Pld | W | D | L | GF | GA | GD | Pts | Relegation | HER | BRA | DAR | ANT | OLD | NAM |
|---|---|---|---|---|---|---|---|---|---|---|---|---|---|---|---|---|
| 1 | Herakles | 10 | 7 | 2 | 1 | 42 | 17 | +25 | 31 | | — | 3–3 | 3–3 | 6–3 | 5–1 | 10–3 |
| 2 | Braxgata | 10 | 6 | 3 | 1 | 43 | 19 | +24 | 28 | | 1–3 | — | 5–3 | 4–2 | 5–1 | 8–1 |
| 3 | Daring | 10 | 5 | 4 | 1 | 22 | 14 | +8 | 24 | | 2–1 | 1–1 | — | 1–1 | 4–3 | 2–0 |
| 4 | Antwerp | 10 | 3 | 3 | 4 | 27 | 27 | 0 | 17 | | 1–2 | 0–5 | 1–1 | — | 5–3 | 6–0 |
| 5 | Old Club | 10 | 1 | 3 | 6 | 23 | 38 | −15 | 6 | Relegation to National 1 | 1–5 | 5–5 | 1–3 | 2–2 | — | 3–1 |
| 6 | Namur | 10 | 0 | 1 | 9 | 12 | 54 | −42 | 3 | Relegation to National 1 | 1–6 | 0–6 | 0–4 | 3–6 | 3–3 | — |

Source: Flashscore

== Play-offs ==
The points obtained during the regular season were halved before the start of the play-offs and the teams were put into two pools. As a result, the teams in pool A started with the following points before the play-offs: Gantoise 18.5 points, Léopold 13, Dragons 11.5 and Racing 9 and in pool B: Waterloo Ducks 16 points, Orée 15, Leuven 11 and Beerschot 10.

=== Pool A ===
| Pos | Team | Pld | W | D | L | GF | GA | GD | Pts | Qualification | DRA | LÉO | GAN | RAC |
|---|---|---|---|---|---|---|---|---|---|---|---|---|---|---|
| 1 | Dragons | 6 | 5 | 0 | 1 | 17 | 7 | +10 | 26.5 | Semi-finals | — | 2–0 | 4–1 | 1–0 |
| 2 | Léopold | 6 | 4 | 0 | 2 | 13 | 12 | +1 | 25 | Semi-finals | 4–3 | — | 2–3 | 2–1 |
| 3 | Gantoise | 6 | 2 | 0 | 4 | 11 | 15 | −4 | 24.5 | | 1–3 | 2–3 | — | 3–1 |
| 4 | Racing | 6 | 1 | 0 | 5 | 6 | 13 | −7 | 12 | | 1–4 | 1–2 | 2–1 | — |

Source: Flashscore

=== Pool B ===
| Pos | Team | Pld | W | D | L | GF | GA | GD | Pts | Qualification | WAT | ORÉ | BEE | LEU |
|---|---|---|---|---|---|---|---|---|---|---|---|---|---|---|
| 1 | Waterloo Ducks | 6 | 4 | 2 | 0 | 25 | 19 | +6 | 30 | Semi-finals | — | 7–4 | 4–3 | 2–2 |
| 2 | Orée | 6 | 2 | 3 | 1 | 29 | 24 | +5 | 24 | Semi-finals | 4–4 | — | 2–2 | 7–3 |
| 3 | Beerschot | 6 | 2 | 2 | 2 | 21 | 17 | +4 | 18 | | 4–5 | 4–4 | — | 4–1 |
| 4 | Leuven | 6 | 0 | 1 | 5 | 13 | 28 | −15 | 12 | | 2–3 | 4–8 | 1–4 | — |

Source: Flashscore

=== Classification matches ===
==== Seventh place game ====
25 April 2021
15:00

| Racing | 1–3 | Leuven |
|---|---|---|
| Horler 34' | Report | Diaz 12'; Murray 39'; Harris 41' |

Uccle

==== Fifth place game ====
24 April 2021
15:00

| Gantoise | 4–1 | Beerschot |
|---|---|---|
| Helin 16'; Masson 38'; Esquelin 45'; Kina 62' | Report | Duvekot 20' |

Ghent

=== Bracket ===
Semi-finals
Waterloo Ducks (s.o.) | 3 | 1 | (4)
Léopold | 2 | 3 | (2)
Dragons (s.o.) | 3 | 1 | (4)
Orée | 2 | 2 | (3)

Final
Waterloo Ducks | 3 | 1
Dragons | 4 | 2
Third place
Léopold | 4 | 5
Orée | 3 | 1

=== Semi-finals ===
25 April 2021
15:30

| Léopold | 2–3 | Waterloo Ducks |
|---|---|---|
| A. Verdussen 6'; Boon 64' | Report | Ghislain 37'; Charlet 56'; Wilbers 70' |

Uccle

2 May 2021
12:30

| Waterloo Ducks | 1–3 | Léopold |
|---|---|---|
| Charlet 28' | Report | A. Verdussen 27', 53'; Plennevaux 39' |
Penalties
| Boccard (penalty shoot-out scored); Willems (penalty shoot-out scored); Willems (penalty shoot-out scored); Van Oost (penalty shoot-out scored) | 4–2 | (penalty shoot-out missed) Plennevaux; (penalty shoot-out scored) Zimmer; (penalty shoot-out scored) Poncelet; (penalty shoot-out missed) Baumgarten |

Waterloo

Series drawn. Waterloo Ducks won shoot-out 4–2.

25 April 2021
12:30

| Orée | 2–3 | Dragons |
|---|---|---|
| Domene 41', 65' | Report | Martínez 30'; Della Torre 66', 69' |

Woluwe-Saint-Pierre

2 May 2021
15:30

| Dragons | 1–2 | Orée |
|---|---|---|
| Della Torre 39' | Report | Dohmen 13'; Clément 45' |
Penalties
| Van Aubel (penalty shoot-out missed); Raes (penalty shoot-out scored); Rubens (penalty shoot-out missed); Denayer (penalty shoot-out scored); Martínez (penalty shoot-out scored); Van Aubel (penalty shoot-out scored) | 4–3 | (penalty shoot-out scored) Simar; (penalty shoot-out scored) Domene; (penalty shoot-out scored) Curty; (penalty shoot-out missed) Dohmen; (penalty shoot-out missed) Bellenger; (penalty shoot-out missed) Domene |

Brasschaat

Series drawn. Dragons won shoot-out 4–3.

=== Third place game ===
8 May 2021
11:00

| Orée | 3–4 | Léopold |
|---|---|---|
| Simar 7'; M. Branicki 18'; Domene 20' | Report | Boon 44', 54'; A. Verdussen 67'; Cuvelier 70' |

Wilrijkse Plein, Antwerp

9 May 2021
11:00

| Léopold | 5–1 | Orée |
|---|---|---|
| Boon 3', 62'; Plennevaux 4', 63'; Poncelet 17' | Report | Domene 57' |

Wilrijkse Plein, Antwerp

Léopold won both matches and captured third place.

=== Final ===
8 May 2021
17:30

| Dragons | 4–3 | Waterloo Ducks |
|---|---|---|
| Martínez 18'; Raes 44'; Charlier 46'; Van Aubel 68' | Report | Willems 16'; Dykmans 64'; Capelle 64' |

Wilrijkse Plein, Antwerp

9 May 2021
17:30

| Waterloo Ducks | 1–2 | Dragons |
|---|---|---|
| Dykmans 55' | Report | Charlier 50'; Rubens 58' |

Wilrijkse Plein, Antwerp

Dragons won both matches and won their 12th national title.

== Statistics ==
=== Top goalscorers ===
| Rank | Player | Club | FG | PC | PS | Goals |
|---|---|---|---|---|---|---|
| 1 | (Belgium) Tom Boon | Léopold | 18 | 13 | 3 | 34 |
| 2 | (Argentina) Tomas Domene | Orée | 4 | 22 | 6 | 32 |
| 3 | (Belgium) Loïck Luypaert | Braxgata | 2 | 25 | 2 | 29 |
| 4 | (Netherlands) Milan van Baal | Antwerp | 18 | 1 | 0 | 19 |
| 4 | (Belgium) Jérôme Dekeyser | Leuven | 4 | 15 | 0 | 19 |
| 6 | (France) Victor Charlet | Waterloo Ducks | 0 | 17 | 1 | 18 |
| 7 | (Belgium) Gaëtan Perez | Beerschot | 13 | 2 | 0 | 15 |
| 7 | (Belgium) Maxime Plennevaux | Léopold | 13 | 2 | 0 | 15 |
| 7 | (France) Timothée Clément | Orée | 13 | 2 | 0 | 15 |
| 10 | (Belgium) Florent Van Aubel | Dragons | 10 | 3 | 1 | 14 |
| 10 | (Belgium) Tommy Willems | Waterloo Ducks | 7 | 2 | 5 | 14 |
