= Wouter Jolie =

Dutch field hockey player

Personal information
- Born: 7 July 1985 (age 41) Naarden, Netherlands

Sport
- Sport: Field hockey
- Position: Defender
Senior career
Years	Team	Caps	Goals
2005–2022	Bloemendaal	-	-
2013–2017	Uttar Pradesh Wizards	-	-
National team
Years	Team	Caps	Goals
2006–2014	Netherlands	157	(10)
Medal record
Men's field hockey
Representing the Netherlands
Olympic Games
Silver medal – second place	2012 London	Team
World Cup
Silver medal – second place	2014 The Hague
Bronze medal – third place	2010 New Delhi
EuroHockey Championship
Gold medal – first place	2007 Manchester
Silver medal – second place	2011 Mönchengladbach
Bronze medal – third place	2013 Boom
Bronze medal – third place	2009 Amstelveen
Champions Trophy
Silver medal – second place	2012 Melbourne
Bronze medal – third place	2007 Kuala Lumpur
Bronze medal – third place	2010 Mönchengladbach
Bronze medal – third place	2011 Auckland
Hockey World League
Gold medal – first place	2012–13 New Delhi	Team

Wouter Jolie (born 7 July 1985) is a Dutch former field hockey player who played as a defender for Bloemendaal and the Netherlands national team.

At the 2012 Summer Olympics, he competed for the national team in the men's tournament. He retired from the national team in 2014 and played for Bloemendaal until 2017. Due to injuries he was called up to the first Bloemendaal squad and played a few matches in the 2019–20, 2020–21 and 2021–22 season.

== Honours ==
Bloemendaal

- Hoofdklasse: 2005–06, 2006–07, 2007–08, 2008–09, 2009–10, 2020–21, 2021–22
- Euro Hockey League: 2008–09, 2012–13, 2021, 2022
- EuroHockey Cup Winners Cup: 2006

Netherlands

- Summer Olympics silver medal: 2012
- EuroHockey Championship: 2007
- Hockey World League: 2012–13
