= 2020–21 División de Honor de Hockey Hierba =

División de Honor
- Dates: 19 September 2020 – 2 May 2021
- Champions: Club de Campo (1st title)
- Regular season: Atlètic Terrassa
- Relegated: CD Terrassa; Giner de los Ríos; Linia 22
- Euro Hockey League: Club de Campo; Atlètic Terrassa
- EHL Ranking Cup: Club Egara
- Matches: 132
- Goals: 599 (4.54 per match)
- Best player: José Basterra
- Top goalscorer: José Basterra (31 goals)
- Biggest home win: Club de Campo 12–0 Giner de los Ríos
- Biggest away win: Giner de los Ríos 0–8 Atlètic Terrassa
- Highest scoring: Club de Campo 11–3 Linia 22

The 2020–21 División de Honor de Hockey Hierba was the 55th season of the División de Honor de Hockey Hierba, the highest men's field hockey league in Spain. The regular season began on 19 September 2020 and is scheduled to finish on 25 April 2021. The play-off semi-finals and final were played on 1 and 2 May 2021 on Atlètic Terrassa.

After last season was suspended due to the COVID-19 pandemic in Spain, this season was played with twelve instead of the regular ten teams. There were no quarter-finals but instead the top four teams qualified directly for the final four.

Club de Campo won their first ever national title by defeating the regular season winners and record champions Atlètic Terrassa 6–3 in the final.

== Teams ==
Location of teams in the 2020–21 División de Honor
Location of Province of Barcelona teams in the 2020–21 División de Honor

Team	Location	Autonomous Community	Stadium
Atlètic Terrassa	Terrassa	Catalonia	Estadi de Hockey Josep Marquès
Barcelona	Barcelona	Catalonia	Pau Negre Stadium
CD Terrassa	Matadepera	Catalonia	Les Pedritxes
Club de Campo	Madrid	Madrid	Club de Campo
Club Egara	Terrassa	Catalonia	Pla de Bon Aire
Complutense	Madrid	Madrid	San Sebastián de los Reyes
Giner de los Ríos	Valencia	Valencia	Estadio Betero
Jolaseta	Getxo	Basque Country	R.C. Jolaseta
Junior	Sant Cugat del Vallès	Catalonia	Sant Cugat
Linia 22	Terrassa	Catalonia	Estadio Municipal de Hockey Martí Colomer
Real Club de Polo	Barcelona	Catalonia	Eduardo Dualde
Tenis	Santander	Cantabria	La Albericia

=== Number of teams by autonomous community ===
Autonomous Community	Number of teams	Teams
Catalonia	7	Atlètic Terrassa, Barcelona, CD Terrassa, Club Egara, Junior, Linia 22, and Real Club de Polo
Madrid	2	Club de Campo and Complutense
Basque Country	1	Jolaseta
Cantabria	1	Tenis
Valencia	1	Giner de los Ríos
Total	12	

== Regular season ==
=== Standings ===
Pos	Team	Pld	W	D	L	GF	GA	GD	Pts	Qualification or relegation
1	Atlètic Terrassa	22	17	4	1	82	27	+55	55	Qualification for the Euro Hockey League and the Final 4
2	Club de Campo (C)	22	17	3	2	88	25	+63	54	Qualification for the Euro Hockey League and the Final 4
3	Club Egara	22	15	4	3	65	31	+34	49	Qualification for the EHL Ranking Cup and the Final 4
4	Real Club de Polo	22	14	6	2	75	27	+48	48	Qualification for the Final 4
5	Complutense	22	10	4	8	42	40	+2	34	
6	Barcelona	22	10	3	9	39	39	0	33	
7	Tenis	22	7	4	11	36	41	−5	25	
8	Junior	22	6	5	11	45	48	−3	23	
9	Jolaseta (O)	22	6	2	14	35	70	−35	20	Qualification for the play-outs
10	CD Terrassa (R)	22	4	6	12	44	61	−17	18	Relegation to the División de Honor Masculina B
11	Giner de los Ríos (R)	22	2	4	16	30	91	−61	10	Relegation to the División de Honor Masculina B
12	Linia 22 (R)	22	1	1	20	18	99	−81	4	Relegation to the División de Honor Masculina B

Source: RFEH
(C) Champions; (O) Play-off winners; (R) Relegated

=== Results ===
Home \ Away	ATL	BAR	CDT	CDC	EGA	COM	GIN	JOL	JNR	LIN	RCP	TEN
Atlètic Terrassa	—	3–2	4–1	5–4	3–3	2–1	5–1	6–1	3–1	4–0	3–2	3–1
Barcelona	1–5	—	3–3	0–1	1–5	1–2	3–0	5–2	2–0	2–1	0–2	3–2
CD Terrassa	1–5	3–3	—	2–4	0–1	1–1	4–4	1–2	1–2	6–0	2–6	2–3
Club de Campo	3–2	1–2	3–1	—	4–0	2–0	12–0	4–0	3–0	11–3	2–2	2–1
Club Egara	2–2	4–1	4–0	2–2	—	5–3	6–1	6–1	4–1	3–1	1–1	2–1
Complutense	0–2	2–1	4–3	0–2	0–1	—	2–1	3–0	3–2	4–1	1–6	0–0
Giner de los Ríos	0–8	0–2	2–3	0–7	1–4	4–4	—	2–6	2–2	2–4	2–5	2–1
Jolaseta	0–7	1–3	2–4	0–6	2–1	3–1	2–3	—	1–3	2–1	1–3	1–2
Junior	2–2	0–1	1–1	2–4	1–3	1–2	6–1	3–3	—	7–0	1–4	3–2
Linia 22	0–4	0–2	0–1	0–6	1–5	1–6	1–1	0–3	2–4	—	2–9	0–4
Real Club de Polo	0–0	1–0	2–2	2–2	1–2	1–1	3–1	5–1	2–1	11–0	—	3–1
Tenis	1–4	1–1	5–2	1–3	3–1	0–2	1–0	1–1	2–2	2–0	1–4	—

Source: RFEH
Legend: Blue = home team win; Yellow = draw; Red = away team win.

=== Top goalscorers ===
As of 25 April 2021

Rank	Player	Club	FG	PC	PS	Goals
1	(Spain) José Basterra	Club de Campo	18	12	1	31
2	(Spain) Marc Miralles	Real Club de Polo	6	19	2	28
3	(Spain) Pau Quemada	Club Egara	7	12	1	20
4	(England) John Kinder	Club de Campo	10	3	0	13
4	(Spain) Pau Cunill	Atlètic Terrassa	0	13	0	13
4	(Spain) Saul Esteve	Giner de los Ríos	0	13	0	13
7	(Spain) Diego Arana	Jolaseta	7	4	1	12
7	(Spain) Alejandro Alonso	Tenis	0	10	2	12
9	(Spain) Jordi Farres	Junior	4	7	0	11
10	(Spain) Quique González	Club de Campo	10	0	0	10
10	(Spain) Jan Lara	CD Terrassa	0	9	1	10

== Final 4 ==
The Final 4 was held at the Estadi de Hockey Josep Marquès from Atlètic Terrassa in Terrassa, Catalonia on 1 and 2 May 2021.

=== Bracket ===
Semi-finals
1 May – Terrassa
Atlètic Terrassa	3
Real Club de Polo	2
1 May – Terrassa
Club de Campo	4
Club Egara	3

Final
2 May – Terrassa
Atlètic Terrassa	3
Club de Campo	6

=== Semi-finals ===
1 May 2021
14:00

Atlètic Terrassa	3–2	Real Club de Polo
Cunill 33', 68'; Bonastre 52'	Report	Lleonart 37'; Oliva 55'

Estadi de Hockey Josep Marquès, Terrassa
Umpires:
Eduardo Garcia
Rayco Mena

1 May 2021
16:00

Club de Campo	4–3	Club Egara
Sánchez 37', 51'; Kinder 48', 50'	Report	Quemada 21', 23'; Aguilar 41'

Estadi de Hockey Josep Marquès, Terrassa
Umpires:
Francisco Vazquez
Diego Estebanez

=== Final ===
2 May 2021
14:00

Atlètic Terrassa	3–6	Club de Campo
M. Escude 15'; Cunill 35', 59'	Report	Tello 32'; Basterra 39', 48', 67'; De Frutos 51'; Sánchez 55'

Estadi de Hockey Josep Marquès, Terrassa
Umpires:
Daniel Rodriguez
Eduardo Garcia

== Play-outs ==
=== Overview ===
Team 1	Series	Team 2	Game 1	Game 2	Game 3
Atlético San Sebastián	1–2	Jolaseta	3–0 (awd.)	1–2	0–3

=== Matches ===
9 May 2021
13:00

Jolaseta	0–3 (awarded)	Atlético San Sebastián
	Report

R.C. Jolaseta, Getxo
Umpires:
Jordi Puig
Marius Cuadrat

15 May 2021
12:45

Atlético San Sebastián	1–2	Jolaseta
Garcia 58'	Report	Zirpel 37'; Arana 41'

Bidebieta-Aiete, San Sebastián
Umpires:
Eduardo Garcia
Francisco Vazquez

16 May 2021
12:45

Atlético San Sebastián	0–3	Jolaseta
	Report	Arana 30'; Vilallonga 37'; Garaizabal 63'

Bidebieta-Aiete, San Sebastián
Umpires:
Diego Estebanez
Francisco Vazquez

Jolaseta won series 2–1 and both teams remain in their respective division.
