= Roel Bovendeert =

Dutch field hockey player

Personal information
- Born: 8 May 1992 (age 34) Boxtel, Netherlands

Sport
- Sport: Field hockey
- Position: Forward
Youth career
- Team
- –: MEP
Senior career
Years	Team	Caps	Goals
2008–2009	MEP	-	-
2009–2023	Bloemendaal	-	-
2020	→ UniKL	-	-
National team
Years	Team	Caps	Goals
2015–2021	Netherlands	32	(9)
Medal record
Men's field hockey
Representing the Netherlands
Champions Trophy
Bronze medal – third place	2018 Breda
Junior World Cup
Bronze medal – third place	2013 New Delhi
EuroHockey Junior Championship
Silver medal – second place	2012 's-Hertogenbosch

Roel Bovendeert (born 8 May 1992) is a Dutch former field hockey player who played as a forward.

== Club career ==
Bovendeert started playing hockey at MEP where he played his whole youth career. In 2009 he signed for Bloemendaal. During the winter break of the 2019–20 season he played for UniKL in the Malaysia Hockey League and won the treble with UniKL. Before the 2022–23 Euro Hockey League Final8 in April 2023 he announced he would retire at the end of that season. He won a total of four European titles with Bloemendaal, he missed the 2021 edition due to injury.

== International career ==
Bovendeert represented the Netherlands at the 2020 Summer Olympics. After the 2020 Olympics he retired from international hockey.

== Honours ==
Bloemendaal

- Euro Hockey League: 2012–13, 2017–18, 2022, 2022–23
- Hoofdklasse: 2009–10, 2018–19, 2020–21, 2021–22

UniKL

- Malaysia Hockey League: 2020
- TNB Cup: 2020
- Charity Shield: 2020
