= Arthur Van Doren =

Belgian field hockey player

Personal information
- Full name: Arthur Georges Stanislas; Henri Van Doren
- Born: 1 October 1994 (age 31) Antwerp, Belgium
- Height: 1.78 m (5 ft 10 in)
- Weight: 74 kg (163 lb)

Sport
- Sport: Field hockey
- Position: Defender
- Club: Braxgata
Youth career
- Team
- –: Dragons
Senior career
Years	Team	Caps	Goals
–2018	Dragons	-	-
2018–2024	Bloemendaal	-	-
2024–present	Braxgata	-	-
National team
Years	Team	Caps	Goals
2012–2013	Belgium U21	36	-
2012–present	Belgium	241	(19)
Medal record
Men's field hockey
Representing Belgium
Olympic Games
Gold medal – first place	2020 Tokyo	Team
Silver medal – second place	2016 Rio de Janeiro	Team
World Cup
Gold medal – first place	2018 Bhubaneswar
Silver medal – second place	2023 Bhubaneswar–Rourkela
EuroHockey Championship
Gold medal – first place	2019 Antwerp
Silver medal – second place	2013 Boom
Silver medal – second place	2017 Amstelveen
Bronze medal – third place	2021 Amstelveen
Bronze medal – third place	2023 Mönchengladbach
Hockey World League
Silver medal – second place	2014–15 Raipur	Team
Youth Olympic Games
Bronze medal – third place	2010 Singapore	Team
EuroHockey Junior Championship
Gold medal – first place	2012 's-Hertogenbosch

Arthur Georges Stanislas Henri Van Doren (born 1 October 1994) is a Belgian field hockey player who plays as a defender for Braxgata and the Belgium national team.

He is the brother of fellow Belgian international Loic Van Doren. In 2017, he won simultaneously both FIH awards of FIH Player and FIH Rising Star of the Year. At the 2018 Hockey Stars Awards he was named the FIH Player of the Year for the second time in a row.

== Club career ==
He played club hockey in Belgium for KHC Dragons. With this club, he became the national hockey champion in 2011. In 2012, he was honoured with the Golden Stick (category junior male players) by the Belgian Hockey Association. Shortly after he won the FIH player of the year award in 2018, it was announced he would join HC Bloemendaal from the 2018–19 season onwards. In his first season with Bloemendaal, he won his first Dutch national title by winning the championship final against Kampong. In January 2020, it was announced he extended his stay at Bloemendaal for at least one more season. He won his second league title with Bloemendaal in the 2020–21 season as he was named the best player of the Hoofdklasse season. After six years in the Netherlands he returned to Belgium in 2024 to play for Braxgata where he signed for four seasons.

== International career ==
Van Doren became European champions with the Belgium under-21 squad in 2012. His first selection for the national team was at the age of 17. With Belgium, he became European vice-champion at the 2013 European Championship on home ground in Boom and at the 2017 European Championship in Amstelveen, Netherlands. He was a part of the Belgian squad which won the silver medal at the 2016 Summer Olympics. In 2016, he won the FIH Rising Star of the Year award, which he won again in 2017 together with the FIH Player of the Year award. He was a part of the Belgian squad which won Belgium its first World Cup and European title. In December 2019, he again was nominated for the FIH Player of the Year Award. On 25 May 2021, he was selected in the squad for the 2021 EuroHockey Championship.

== Honours ==
=== International ===
Belgium

- Olympic gold medal: 2020
- Olympic silver medal: 2016
- World Cup: 2018
- EuroHockey Championship: 2019
- FIH Pro League: 2020–21

Belgium U21

- EuroHockey Junior Championship: 2012

=== Club ===
Bloemendaal

- Hoofdklasse: 2018–19, 2020–21, 2021–22
- Euro Hockey League: 2021, 2022, 2022–23

Dragons

- Belgian Hockey League: 2010–11, 2014–15, 2015–16, 2016–17, 2017–18

=== Individual ===
- FIH Rising Star of the Year: 2016, 2017
- FIH Player of the Year: 2017, 2018
- Gouden Stick: 2014, 2016, 2017
- EuroHockey Championship Player of the Tournament: 2017
- FIH Hockey World Cup Best Player: 2018
- Hoofdklasse Player of the Season: 2020–21

Preceded by Christopher Rühr	FIH Rising Star of the Year; 2016–2017	Succeeded by Arthur De Sloover
Preceded by John-John Dohmen	FIH Player of the Year; 2017–2018	Succeeded by Manpreet Singh
