= Elian Mazkour =

German field hockey player (born 2002)

Personal information
- Full name: Elian Marinus Gabriel Mazkour
- Born: 9 March 2001 (age 25) Bonn, Germany

Sport
- Sport: Field hockey
- Position: Forward
- Club: UHC Hamburg
Senior career
Years	Team	Caps	Goals
–2021	Uhlenhorst Mülheim	-	-
2021–2025	Rot-Weiss Köln	-	-
2025–2026	Bloemendaal	-	-
2026–present	UHC Hamburg	-	-
National team
Years	Team	Caps	Goals
2022–present	Germany	25	(9)
2022–2022	Germany U21	5	(3)
2024–present	Germany Indoor	6	(7)
Medal record
Representing Germany
Men's field hockey
EuroHockey U21 Championship
Silver medal – second place	2022 Ghent
EuroHockey U18 Championship
Bronze medal – third place	2018 Santander
Men's indoor hockey
EuroHockey Indoor Championship
Gold medal – first place	2024 Leuven

Elian Marinus Gabriel Mazkour (born 9 March 2001) is a German field hockey player who plays as a forward for Bundesliga club UHC Hamburg and the German national team.

== Personal life ==
Elian Mazkour grew up in the city of Bonn, Germany.

== Club career ==
In the German national league, the Bundesliga, Mazkour represented Rot-Weiss Köln until 2025. He also previously represented Uhlenhorst Mülheim. He played one season in the Dutch Hoofdklasse for Bloemendaal during the 2025–26 season. He returned to Germany to play for UHC Hamburg.

== International career ==
=== Under–21 ===
Mazkour debuted for the German U–21 side in 2022. He made his first and only appearances for the national junior team at the EuroHockey U–21 Championship held in Ghent. At the tournament, he helped the squad to a silver medal, scoring three times throughout the competition.

=== Honamas ===
Following his junior international debut, Mazkour received his first call–up to the Honamas in 2022. He earned his first senior international cap during a match against England in Mönchengladbach, during the third season of the FIH Pro League.

Since his debut, Mazkour has appeared in the fourth, fifth and sixth seasons of the FIH Pro League.

=== Indoor hockey ===
In addition to field hockey, Mazkour has represented the German Indoor squad. He became a European champion in 2024, taking home a gold medal from the EuroHockey Indoor Championship in Leuven.
