= Jorrit Croon =

Dutch field hockey player

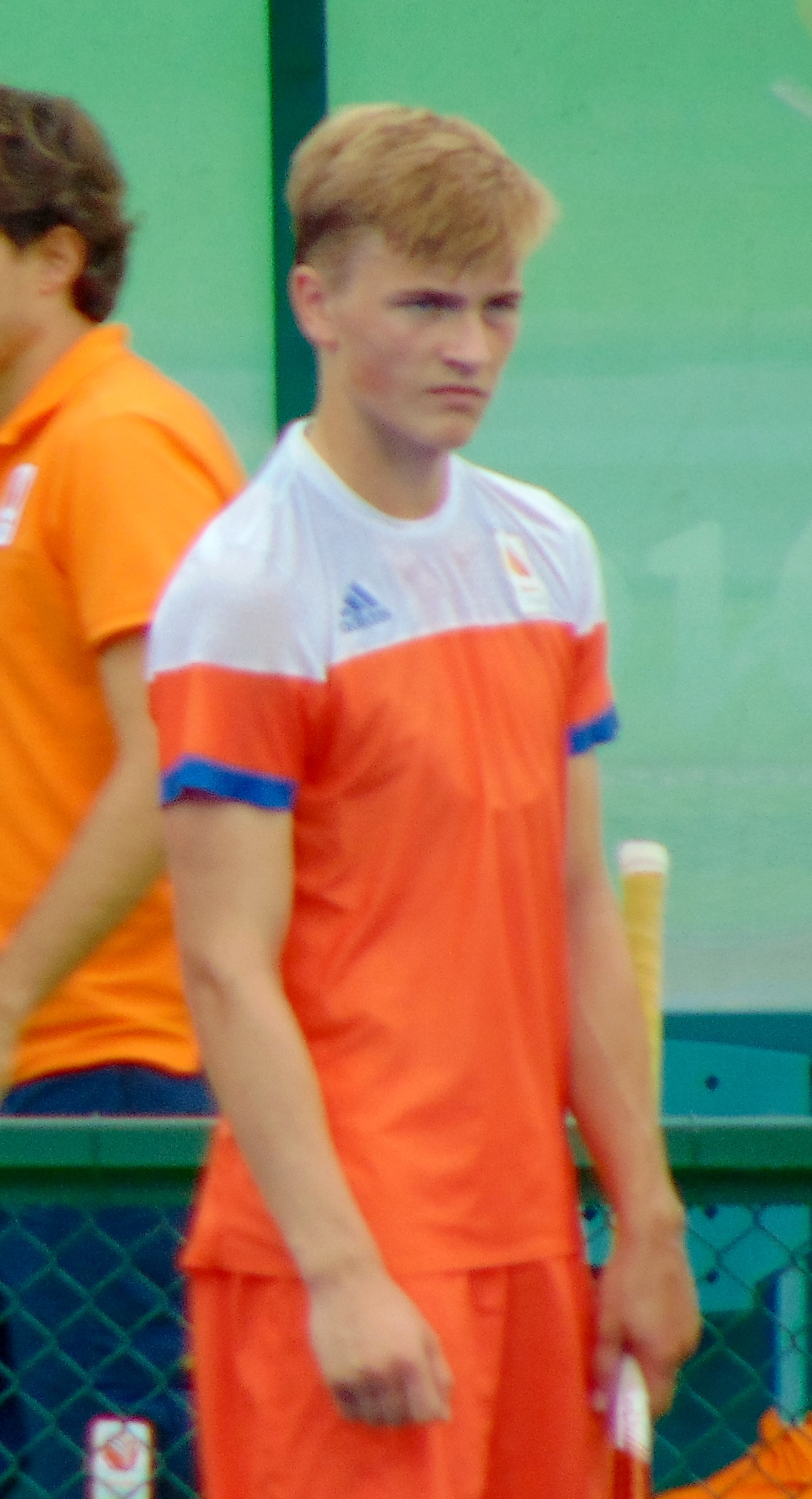
- Croon at the 2016 Olympics

Personal information
- Born: 9 August 1998 (age 28) Leiderdorp, Netherlands
- Height: 1.83 m (6 ft 0 in)
- Weight: 75 kg (165 lb)

Sport
- Sport: Field hockey
- Position: Midfielder / Forward
- Club: Bloemendaal
Youth career
- Team
- –: L.S.C. Alecto
- –: HGC
Senior career
Years	Team	Caps	Goals
2014–2018	HGC	-	-
2018–present	Bloemendaal	-	-
National team
Years	Team	Caps	Goals
2015–2016	Netherlands U21	8	(2)
2016–present	Netherlands	127	(19)
Medal record
Men's field hockey
Representing the Netherlands
Olympic Games
Gold medal – first place	2024 Paris	Team
World Cup
Silver medal – second place	2018 Bhubaneswar
Bronze medal – third place	2023 Bhubaneswar–Rourkela
EuroHockey Championship
Gold medal – first place	2017 Amstelveen
Gold medal – first place	2021 Amstelveen
Gold medal – first place	2023 Mönchengladbach
Silver medal – second place	2025 Mönchengladbach
Champions Trophy
Bronze medal – third place	2018 Breda

Jorrit Croon (Dutch pronunciation: [ˈjɔrɪt ˈkroːn]; born 9 August 1998) is a Dutch professional field hockey player who plays as a midfielder or forward for Bloemendaal and the Dutch national team.

== Club career ==
Croon started playing hockey at LSC Alecto. Since 2014 he has played for the first team of HGC, he made his debut at 16 years old. In 2016 Croon and his team finished third in the Hoofdklasse but were eliminated in the playoffs to win the national championship. After 3 seasons with HGC, he transferred in the summer of 2018 to Bloemendaal. In his first season with Bloemendaal, he won his first Dutch national title by defeating Kampong in the championship final.

== International career ==
After his great performances in the Hoofdklasse, Croon was called up for the national team to play in the 2016 Summer Olympics. At the 2017 EuroHockey Championship, where the Netherlands won the gold medal, Croon won the Under-21 Player of the Tournament award. He initially wasn't selected for the 2018 World Cup, but he replaced the injured Floris Wortelboer before the start of the tournament. He had to miss the 2019 EuroHockey Championship due to a shoulder injury he incurred during the 2019 FIH Pro League semi-finals.

== Personal life ==
Croon is studying commercial economy at the Johan Cruyff University in Amsterdam.

== Honours ==
=== Club ===
Bloemendaal

- Hoofdklasse: 2018–19, 2020–21, 2021–22
- Euro Hockey League: 2021, 2022, 2022–23

=== International ===
Netherlands

- EuroHockey Championship: 2017, 2021, 2023
- FIH Pro League: 2021–22, 2022–23
