= 2020–21 Men's Hoofdklasse Hockey =

Hoofdklasse
- Season: 2020–21
- Dates: 6 September 2020 – 16 May 2021
- Champions: Bloemendaal (21st title)
- Regular season: Bloemendaal
- Relegated: Almere
- Euro Hockey League: Bloemendaal; Kampong
- EHL Ranking Cup: Rotterdam
- Matches played: 132
- Goals scored: 668 (5.06 per match)
- Best Player: Arthur Van Doren
- Top goalscorer: Alexander Hendrickx (21 goals)
- Biggest home win: Kampong 11–0 Almere
- Biggest away win: Almere 0–10 Pinoké
- Highest scoring: Rotterdam 6–6 Amsterdam

The 2020–21 Men's Hoofdklasse Hockey, also known as the Tulp Hoofdklasse Men for sponsorship reasons, was the 48th season of the Men's Hoofdklasse Hockey, the top Dutch field hockey league. The season began on 6 September 2020 and was suspended for at least four weeks on 13 October 2020 due to the COVID-19 pandemic in the Netherlands. The season resumed on 31 January 2021. It concluded with the third match of the championship final on 16 May 2021. On 23 April 2021 it was announced that the relegation play-offs would not be played because the second division's season could not be finished due to the pandemic.

The defending champions Bloemendaal won their 21st title by defeating Kampong 2–0 in the final best of three series.

== Teams ==
2020–21 Men's Hoofdklasse teams

=== Accommodation and locations ===
Team	Location	Province	Accommodation
Almere	Almere	Flevoland	Sportpark Klein Brandt
Amsterdam	Amstelveen	North Holland	Wagener Stadium
Bloemendaal	Bloemendaal	North Holland	Sportpark 't Kopje
Den Bosch	's-Hertogenbosch	North Brabant	Sportpark Oosterplas
HGC	Wassenaar	South Holland	De Roggewoning
Hurley	Amstelveen	North Holland	Amsterdamse Bos
Kampong	Utrecht	Utrecht	De Klapperboom
Klein Zwitserland	The Hague	South Holland	Sportpark Klein Zwitserland
Oranje-Rood	Eindhoven	North Brabant	Sportpark Aalsterweg
Pinoké	Amstelveen	North Holland	Amsterdamse Bos
Rotterdam	Rotterdam	South Holland	Hazelaarweg Stadion
Tilburg	Tilburg	North Brabant	Sportpark Oude Warande

=== Personnel and kits ===
Team	Trainer-coach	Captain	Kit manufacturer	Shirt sponsor
Almere	(Netherlands) Arjan Jolie (Netherlands) Bart van der Wolff	(Netherlands) Jules Roelvink	Indian Maharadja	ABN AMRO
Amsterdam	(Spain) Santi Freixa	(Netherlands) Billy Bakker	Adidas	ABN AMRO
Bloemendaal	(Netherlands) Rick Mathijssen	(Netherlands) Glenn Schuurman	Osaka	ABN AMRO
Den Bosch	(Netherlands) Jeroen Verboom	(South Africa) Austin Smith	Indian Maharadja	Rabobank
HGC	(Netherlands) Paul van Ass	(Netherlands) Seve van Ass	Indian Maharadja	ABN AMRO
Hurley	(Netherlands) Reinoud Wolff	(Netherlands) Thom Hayward	Osaka	Orange
Kampong	(Netherlands) Roelant Oltmans	(Netherlands) Sander de Wijn	Reece	Rabobank
Klein Zwitserland	(Netherlands) Omar Schlingemann	(Netherlands) Steven van Rhede van der Kloot	Dita	ABN AMRO
Oranje-Rood	(Netherlands) Robert van der Horst	(Belgium) Thomas Briels	Reece	ABN AMRO
Pinoké	(Netherlands) Jesse Mahieu	(Netherlands) Jannis van Hattum	Adidas	Simpel
Rotterdam	(Netherlands) Albert Kees Maneschijn	(Netherlands) Jeroen Hertzberger	Osaka	ABN AMRO
Tilburg	(Netherlands) Jeroen Delmee	(Netherlands) Felix Gulinck	Adidas	Struplast

=== Number of teams by province ===
Province	Number of teams	Teams
North Holland	4	Amsterdam, Bloemendaal, Hurley and Pinoké
North Brabant	3	Den Bosch, Oranje-Rood and Tilburg
South Holland	3	HGC, Klein Zwitserland and Rotterdam
Utrecht	1	Kampong
Flevoland	1	Almere
Total	12	

== Regular season ==
=== League table ===
Pos	Team	Pld	W	D	L	GF	GA	GD	Pts	Qualification or relegation
1	Bloemendaal (C)	22	19	2	1	85	34	+51	59	Qualification for the Euro Hockey League and the play-offs
2	Kampong	22	18	2	2	78	31	+47	53 (Note: Kampong received a three-point deduction for fielding an ineligible player in the game against Tilburg.)	Qualification for the Euro Hockey League and the play-offs
3	Rotterdam	22	12	6	4	66	42	+24	42	Qualification for the EHL Ranking Cup and the play-offs
4	Den Bosch	22	13	2	7	50	34	+16	41	Qualification for the play-offs
5	Pinoké	22	12	3	7	75	41	+34	39	
6	HGC	22	12	1	9	61	43	+18	37	
7	Amsterdam	22	8	6	8	59	60	−1	30	
8	Oranje-Rood	22	9	2	11	61	63	−2	29	
9	Tilburg	22	5	3	14	42	83	−41	18	
10	Hurley	22	5	0	17	32	74	−42	15	
11	Klein Zwitserland	22	3	5	14	35	61	−26	14	
12	Almere (R)	22	0	0	22	24	102	−78	0	Relegation to the Promotieklasse

Source: Flashscore
Rules for classification: 1) points; 2) matches won; 3) goal difference; 4) goals for; 5) head-to-head result.
(C) Champions; (R) Relegated

=== Results ===
Home \ Away	ALM	AMS	BLO	DB	HGC	HUR	KAM	KZ	OR	PIN	ROT	TIL
Almere	—	2–3	1–7	1–2	0–7	2–4	1–2	1–4	2–4	0–10	3–7	1–5
Amsterdam	4–0	—	1–3	2–4	3–2	5–1	1–4	4–2	5–1	1–3	3–3	1–1
Bloemendaal	5–2	6–3	—	3–0	3–2	9–2	4–1	3–2	3–1	1–1	2–2	8–3
Den Bosch	2–0	5–1	1–0	—	1–2	3–0	2–4	2–1	2–2	3–2	1–2	3–1
HGC	5–1	4–3	0–2	4–0	—	2–1	2–3	4–0	4–1	1–2	0–7	3–0
Hurley	2–1	1–3	0–6	0–6	0–1	—	1–4	4–2	1–5	2–6	1–3	3–2
Kampong	11–0	6–3	1–2	2–1	5–4	1–0	—	5–0	3–1	1–0	6–3	4–0
Klein Zwitserland	2–1	1–1	2–3	1–1	3–3	0–2	0–4	—	1–5	1–2	1–4	2–2
Oranje-Rood	3–2	2–2	2–5	3–1	2–3	4–1	1–3	4–3	—	2–3	1–4	6–3
Pinoké	6–1	0–0	2–3	2–3	3–2	5–4	2–5	4–2	4–5	—	2–2	8–1
Rotterdam	4–0	6–6	1–2	0–3	0–4	1–0	2–2	1–1	4–3	1–0	—	3–0
Tilburg	3–2	3–4	4–5	1–4	3–2	3–2	1–1	1–4	4–3	0–8	1–6	—

Source: Flashscore
Legend: Blue = home team win; Yellow = draw; Red = away team win.

=== Top goalscorers ===
As of 2 May 2021

Rank	Player	Club	FG	PC	PS	Goals
1	(Belgium) Alexander Hendrickx	Pinoké	1	18	2	21
2	(Netherlands) Mirco Pruyser	Amsterdam	14	2	4	20
3	(Netherlands) Jeroen Hertzberger	Rotterdam	6	8	5	19
3	(Netherlands) Tim Swaen	Bloemendaal	1	18	0	19
5	(Netherlands) Bjorn Kellerman	Kampong	15	0	0	15
5	(Netherlands) Thijs van Dam	Rotterdam	13	2	0	15
5	(Netherlands) Seve van Ass	HGC	2	11	2	15
5	(Netherlands) Jip Janssen	Kampong	1	14	0	15
9	(South Africa) Austin Smith	Den Bosch	1	13	0	14
10	(Belgium) Sébastien Dockier	Pinoké	13	0	0	13
10	(Belgium) Tanguy Cosyns	Amsterdam	4	9	0	13
10	(Netherlands) Teun Beins	Oranje-Rood	2	10	1	13
10	(United States) Aki Kaeppeler	Klein Zwitserland	0	13	0	13

== Play-offs ==
The play-offs started on 5 May 2021 with the semi-finals. All rounds are played in a best of three format, with the higher seeded team playing the second and third game at home.

=== Bracket ===
Semi-finals
Bloemendaal	5	3
Den Bosch	1	0
Kampong	3	1
Rotterdam	0	0

Final
Bloemendaal	2 (4)	2 (3)
Kampong	2 (3)	2 (1)

=== Semi-finals ===
5 May 2021
18:30

Den Bosch	1–5	Bloemendaal
Lodewijks 21'	Report	T. Brinkman 32'; Fuchs 42'; Bovendeert 50'; Van der Drift 62'; Swaen 66'

Sportpark Oosterplas, 's-Hertogenbosch

8 May 2021
14:00

Bloemendaal	3–0	Den Bosch
J. Brinkman 31', 65'; Van der Drift 55'	Report

Sportpark 't Kopje, Bloemendaal

Bloemendaal won series 2–0.

5 May 2021
20:30

Rotterdam	0–3	Kampong
	Report	Kemperman 17'; Havenga 25'; Gruter 60'

Hazelaarweg Stadion, Rotterdam

8 May 2021
16:00

Kampong	1–0	Rotterdam
Ceulemans 54'	Report

De Klapperboom, Utrecht

Kampong won series 2–0.

=== Final ===
13 May 2021
14:30

Kampong	2–2	Bloemendaal
Janssen 27'; Havenga 35'	Report	Fuchs 5'; Van Doren 63'
Penalties
	3–4

De Klapperboom, Utrecht

15 May 2021
16:00

Bloemendaal	2–2	Kampong
T. Brinkman 25', 59'	Report	Kemperman 17'; Lageman 42'
Penalties
	3–1

Sportpark 't Kopje, Bloemendaal

Bloemendaal won series 2–0 and won their 21st national title.
