= 2022 Men's EuroHockey Club Trophy I =

Tournament details
- Host country: France
- City: Paris
- Dates: 15–18 April
- Teams: 4 (from 4 associations)

Final positions
- Champions: (France) Montrouge (2nd title)
- Runner-up: (Switzerland) Rotweiss Wettingen
- Third place: (Portugal) Lousada

Tournament statistics
- Matches played: 8
- Goals scored: 43 (5.38 per match)
- Top scorer(s): (France) Corentin Sellier (5 goals)
- Best player: (France) Corentin Sellier
- Best goalkeeper: (Switzerland) Joel Schüpbach

The 2022 Men's EuroHockey Club Trophy I was the 45th edition of Europe's secondary men's club field hockey tournament organized by the European Hockey Federation and the second edition since it was renamed from the EuroHockey Club Trophy to the EuroHockey Club Trophy I. It was held in Paris, France, from 15 to 18 April 2022.

== Qualified teams ==
The following eight teams with the following seeding were qualified for the tournament. Dinamo Elektrostal and Stroitel Brest were excluded due to the Russian invasion of Ukraine. Grunwald Poznań and OKS Vinnitsa withdrew before the tournament.

1. (Russia) ~~Dinamo Elektrostal~~
2. (France) Montrouge
3. (Switzerland) Rotweiss Wettingen
4. (Belarus) ~~Stroitel Brest~~
5. (Ukraine) ~~OKS Vinnitsa~~
6. (Poland) ~~Grunwald Poznań~~
7. (Czech Republic) Bohemians Prague
8. (Portugal) Lousada

== Preliminary round ==
=== Pool A ===
Pos	Team	Pld	W	D	L	GF	GA	GD	Pts	Qualification
1	(France) Montrouge (H)	3	3	0	0	15	1	+14	15	Final
2	(Switzerland) Rotweiss Wettingen	3	2	0	1	13	6	+7	10	Final
3	(Portugal) Lousada	3	0	1	2	4	12	−8	2	Third place game
4	(Czech Republic) Bohemians Prague	3	0	1	2	5	18	−13	2	Third place game

Source: EHF
Rules for classification: 1) points; 2) matches won; 3) goal difference; 4) goals for; 5) head-to-head result; 6) field goals for.
(H) Hosts

15 April 2022
16:30

Rotweiss Wettingen (Switzerland)	4–1	(Portugal) Lousada
	Report

15 April 2022
18:45

Montrouge (France)	6–1	(Czech Republic) Bohemians Prague
	Report

16 April 2022
14:30

Bohemians Prague (Czech Republic)	3–3	(Portugal) Lousada
	Report

16 April 2022
16:45

Rotweiss Wettingen (Switzerland)	0–4	(France) Montrouge
	Report

17 April 2022
12:30

Bohemians Prague (Czech Republic)	1–9	(Switzerland) Rotweiss Wettingen
	Report

17 April 2022
14:45

Montrouge (France)	5–0	(Portugal) Lousada
	Report

== Classification round ==
=== Third place game ===
18 April 2022
10:00

Lousada (Portugal)	2–1	(Czech Republic) Bohemians Prague
	Report

=== Final ===
18 April 2022
12:15

Montrouge (France)	2–1	(Switzerland) Rotweiss Wettingen
	Report

== Final standings ==
1. (France) Montrouge
2. (Switzerland) Rotweiss Wettingen
3. (Portugal) Lousada
4. (Czech Republic) Bohemians Prague

== See also ==
- 2022 Men's Euro Hockey League
- 2022 Men's EuroHockey Club Trophy II
- 2022 Women's EuroHockey Club Trophy
