= Louise Cavenaile =

Belgian field hockey player

Personal information
- Born: 17 February 1989 (age 37) Uccle, Belgium
- Height: 1.72 m (5 ft 8 in)
- Weight: 66 kg (146 lb)

Sport
- Sport: Field hockey
- Position: Defender
- Club: Waterloo Ducks H.C.
National team
Years	Team	Caps	Goals
–	Belgium	229	-
Medal record
Women's field hockey
Representing Belgium
European Championships
Silver medal – second place	2017 Amstelveen

Louise Cavenaile (born 17 February 1989) is a Belgian field hockey player. At the 2012 Summer Olympics she competed with the Belgium women's national field hockey team. She has played with the Belgium women's national field hockey team since 2004, when she was 16. Louise Cavenaile won the Gold Stick for being the best young player ("stick d'or espoir") of the season 2004–2005.

Louise played for Uccle Sport in her youth, then 3 years with Dragons. Louise is now playing for Waterloo Ducks (WatDucks) in the Honour League of the Belgian Championship. She won her first Women championship title with the Watducks during season 2017–2018. She started in 2017 a career as hockey Coach leading (so far) to two Belgian Championship titles: Indoor with Watducks Women Team and Outdoor with Watducks U19 Girls, both during season 2017–2018.
