= KHC Dragons =

Belgian field hockey club

Dragons
- Full name: Koninklijke Hockey Club Dragons
- Nickname(s): The Reds, The Dragons
- League: Men's Belgian Hockey League; Women's Belgian Hockey League
- Founded: 26 October 1946; 80 years ago
- Home ground: The Mansion of Dragons, Brasschaat
- Website: Club website
Home	Away

Koninklijke Hockey Club Dragons, also known as KHC Dragons or simply Dragons, is a Belgian professional field hockey club based in Brasschaat, Antwerp Province. The club was founded in 1946. Since the end of the eighties the club competes in Belgium's first tier, Honour Division.

== History ==
HC Dragons were founded on the 26th of October 1946 at Café Royal in Berchem. With only 11 members the club played recreational hockey in the Belgian lower divisions.

Before moving in 1961 to the present location in Brasschaat the club played on different fields around Antwerp. The club's turning point came in 1981 when Jacques Daems became the president of the club. It was his ambition that the club should be one of the best in Belgium. A few years later the club installed its first artificial turf and promoted in 1988 to the Honour Division. A year later the women's team promoted to the Honour Division as well.

In 1996 the club celebrated its 50th anniversary and changed its name to Koninklijke Hockey Club Dragons (Royal Hockey Club Dragons). Meanwhile, the club installed its second artificial turf and the club won its first silverware when the women's team won in 1994 the Belgian double.

Ather the first successes with the women's team, the men's team won its first championship in 1997. Ever since both Dragons men and women are considered Belgian top teams.

Together with the rise of Belgian hockey, Dragons flourished as well at the European level. After winning its 6th national title in 2010 Dragons participated for the first time in the Euro Hockey League. Beating the reigning UHC Hamburg. One year later Dragons won the Bronze medal and played the EHL final 2013.

Besides the successes, the club kept growing in numbers and added a third artificial turf in 2013. In 2015 Dragons was the host of the World League Semi-Final and added even a fourth field. At the moment KHC Dragons count 1500 members and are the biggest hockey club in Belgium.

== Pronunciation ==
In English communication, the club is often pronounced in an English manner. Officially though, the club has to be pronounced in the French way (drʁagõ) without 's'.

Therefore, the Dragons (De Draken) is a nickname for the players. (sometimes female players are referred to as Dragonettes).

== Players ==
=== Current squad ===
==== Men's squad ====
As of 2021–22

Head coach: (Netherlands) Dennis Dijkshoorn

No.	Pos.	Nation	Player
1	MF	BEL	Victor Foubert
2	GK	BEL	Loic Van Doren
4	MF	BEL	Lucas Putters
5	DF	BEL	Max Lootens
7	MF	BEL	Robbert Rubens
8	GK	BEL	Vincent Schroyen
9	DF	BEL	Mathew Cobbaert
10	FW	ARG	Nicolás Della Torre
11	FW	BEL	Florent Van Aubel

No.	Pos.	Nation	Player
12	DF	BEL	Timothy Luyten
13	MF	BEL	Simon Gougnard
17	DF	BEL	Sebastiaan Geers
19	MF	BEL	Félix Denayer (Captain)
20	DF	BEL	Robert Snoeck
21	GK	BEL	Frédréric Beeckman
22	FW	ARG	Lucas Martínez
23	FW	BEL	Henri Raes
27	DF	IRE	Conor Harte

==== Women's squad ====
As of 2021–22

Head coach: Justus Robert

No.	Pos.	Nation	Player
1	GK	BEL	Marie Goethals De Mude
2	GK	NED	Roos Knijff
3	MF	ARG	Rocio Emme
5	DF	BEL	Stephanie De Groof (Captain)
7	DF	BEL	Ophélie Marien
8	MF	GER	Anabel Herzsprung
9	MF	NED	Imke Verstraeten
10	FW	NED	Fleur Broers
11	MF	NED	Valerie Magis

No.	Pos.	Nation	Player
12	MF	BEL	Fleur Verboven
14	FW	BEL	Manon Simons
15	FW	BEL	Abigail Raye
17	MF	BEL	Delphine Marien
18	FW	BEL	Margaux Struyf
23	MF	ARG	Jimena Cedrés
24	DF	BEL	Carolien Jakus
25	DF	URU	Manuela Vilar del Valle

=== Notable players ===
==== Men's internationals ====
Belgium

- Thomas Briels
- Félix Denayer
- Loïck Luypaert
- Xavier Reckinger
- Jeffrey Thys
- Florent van Aubel
- Arthur Van Doren
- Victor Wegnez

Ireland

- Joe Brennan
- Stephen Butler
- Kyle Good
- Eugene Magee
- Geoff McCabe
- Shane O'Donoghue
- Graham Shaw
- Kirk Shimmins
- Michael Watt

==== Women's internationals ====
Belgium

- Louise Cavenaile
- Stephanie De Groof

Ireland

- Emily Beatty
- Kate Lloyd
- Shirley McCay

Italy

- Chiara Tiddi

== Honours ==
=== Men ===
Belgian Hockey League

- Winners (12): 1996–97, 1998–99, 1999–2000, 2000–01, 2002–03, 2009–10, 2010–11, 2014–15, 2015–16, 2016–17, 2017–18, 2020–21

Euro Hockey League

- Runners-up (1): 2012–13

EuroHockey Club Trophy

- Winners (1): 2001
- Runners-up (1): 1998

EuroHockey Cup Winners Trophy

- Winners (2): 2003, 2005

Belgian Cup

- Winners (3): 1993, 2002, 2005

Belgian Indoor Championship

- Winners (1): 1999

=== Women ===
Belgian Hockey League

- Winners (1): 1993–94

EuroHockey Club Trophy

- Winners (1): 2022

Belgian Cup

- Winners (2): 1994, 2005

Belgian Indoor Championship

- Winners (1): 1997
