= José Basterra =

Spanish field hockey player (born 1997)

Personal information
- Full name: José Maria Basterra Ochoa
- Born: 3 January 1997 (age 29) Getxo, Spain
- Height: 1.85 m (6 ft 1 in)

Sport
- Sport: Field hockey
- Position: Forward
- Club: Léopold
Youth career
- Team
- –: Jolaseta
Senior career
Years	Team	Caps	Goals
2012–2015	Jolaseta	-	-
2015–2017	Complutense	-	-
2017–2024	Club de Campo	-	-
2024–present	Léopold	-	-
National team
Years	Team	Caps	Goals
2017	Spain U21	4	(1)
2021–present	Spain	81	(33)
Medal record
World Cup
Silver medal – second place	2026 Wavre/Amstelveen
EuroHockey Championships
Bronze medal – third place	2025 Mönchengladbach
- Updated on 26 January 2025

José María Basterra Ochoa (born 3 January 1997) is a Spanish field hockey player who plays as a forward for Belgian Hockey League club Léopold and the Spanish national team. He has participated in the Tokyo and Paris Olympic Games (2020 and 2024).

== Club career ==
Basterra started playing hockey at age six at Jolaseta in Getxo. He made his debut for the first senior team in 2012 when he was just fifteen years old. From 2015 to 2017 he played for Complutense in Madrid. In 2017 after the 2017 Men's EuroHockey Junior Championship, he signed for the other Madrid club Club de Campo. He was named the best player of the División de Honor in the 2020–21 season as Club de Campo won their first ever Spanish national title. After the 2024 Summer Olympics he moved to Belgium to play for Léopold.

== International career ==
Basterra made his debut for the senior national team in February 2021 in a FIH Pro League match against Belgium. On 25 May 2021, he was selected in the squad for the 2021 EuroHockey Championship, his first senior tournament. He competed in the 2020 Summer Olympics.
