= Félix Denayer =

Belgian field hockey player

Personal information
- Full name: Félix Veronique Denayer
- Born: 31 January 1990 (age 36) Edegem, Belgium
- Height: 1.90 m (6 ft 3 in)
- Weight: 85 kg (187 lb)

Sport
- Sport: Field hockey
- Position: Midfielder
- Club: Dragons
Senior career
Years	Team	Caps	Goals
2007–present	Dragons	-	-
National team
Years	Team	Caps	Goals
2008–2024	Belgium	402	(48)
Medal record
Men's field hockey
Representing Belgium
Olympic Games
Gold medal – first place	2020 Tokyo	Team
Silver medal – second place	2016 Rio de Janeiro	Team
World Cup
Gold medal – first place	2018 Bhubaneswar
Silver medal – second place	2023 Bhubaneswar/Rourkela
EuroHockey Championship
Gold medal – first place	2019 Antwerp
Silver medal – second place	2013 Boom
Silver medal – second place	2017 Amstelveen
Bronze medal – third place	2021 Amstelveen
Bronze medal – third place	2023 Mönchengladbach
Hockey World League
Silver medal – second place	2014–15 Raipur	Team

Félix Veronique Denayer (born 31 January 1990) is a Belgian professional field hockey player who plays as a midfielder for Dragons and the Belgium national team. He played 402 matches for the Belgium national team from 2008 until 2024.

Denayer combines his sport with studies at the University of Antwerp.

== International career ==
Denayer competed for the national team at the 2008, 2012 and 2016 Olympics, winning a silver medal at the Rio Olympics. With Belgium he won the silver medal at the 2013 European Championship on home ground in Boom, and again at the 2017 European Championships in Amsterdam. He also tasted World Cup success with Belgium in 2018. In 2019, he was a part of the squad which won Belgium its first European title. On 25 May 2021, he was selected in the squad for the 2021 EuroHockey Championship. He was the captain of the Belgian team which won the gold medal at the 2020 Summer Olympics. In August 2024 he announced after the quarterfinal loss in the 2024 Summer Olympics against Spain would be his last match with the national team.

== Honours ==
=== International ===
Belgium

- Olympic gold medal: 2020
- World Cup: 2018
- EuroHockey Championship: 2019
- FIH Pro League: 2020–21

=== Club ===
Dragons

- Belgian Hockey League: 2009–10, 2010–11, 2014–15, 2015–16, 2016–17, 2017–18, 2020–21

Olympic Games
Preceded by Olivia Borlée	Flagbearer for Belgium (with Nafissatou Thiam); Tokyo 2020	Succeeded by Incumbent
