= HC Bloemendaal =

Dutch professional field hockey club

Coordinates: 52°24′40″N 4°36′46″E

Bloemendaal
- Full name: Hockey Club Bloemendaal
- Nickname(s): De Musschen
- League: Men's Hoofdklasse; Women's Hoofdklasse
- Founded: 26 April 1895; 131 years ago
- Home ground: Sportpark 't Kopje, Bloemendaal (Capacity 4,000+)
- Website: Club website
Home	Away

Hockey Club Bloemendaal (Dutch pronunciation: [ˈblumə(n)daːl]), commonly known as Bloemendaal, is a Dutch professional field hockey club based in Bloemendaal, North Holland. It was established on 26 April 1895, and is one of the oldest field hockey clubs in the Netherlands. Originally, the club also played bandy. HC Bloemendaal is one of the most successful clubs in the Netherlands, with the men's team competing for the title in the highest league ("Hoofdklasse") nearly every year.

== Honours ==
=== Men ===
Type	Competition	Titles	Seasons
Outdoor	National title / Hoofdklasse	22	1918–19, 1919–20, 1920–21, 1921–22, 1922–23, 1985–86, 1986–87, 1987–88, 1988–89, 1990–91, 1992–93, 1998–99, 1999–2000, 2001–02, 2005–06, 2006–07, 2007–08, 2008–09, 2009–10, 2018–19, 2020–21, 2021–22
Outdoor	Euro Hockey League	6	2008–09, 2012–13, 2017–18, 2021, 2022, 2022–23
Outdoor	EuroHockey Club Champions Cup	2	1987, 2001
Outdoor	EuroHockey Cup Winners Cup	2	2006
Indoor	National title	1	1986–87

=== Women ===
Type	Competition	Titles	Seasons
Outdoor	Gold Cup	2	2017–18, 2025–26
Outdoor	Promotieklasse	1	2024–25

== Players ==
=== Current squad ===
==== Men's squad ====
As of 25 September 2026

No.	Pos.	Nation	Player
1	GK	NED	Maurits Visser
4	FW	ESP	Pere Amat
5	MF	BEL	Arno Van Dessel
6	DF	NED	Gijs ter Braak
7	MF	ENG	Zachary Wallace
8	MF	NED	Lucas Veen
9	FW	BEL	Max Langer
10	MF	NED	Jorrit Croon (Captain)
11	FW	NED	Casper van der Veen
12	DF	NED	Wouter Jolie
13	DF	NED	Jasper Brinkman

No.	Pos.	Nation	Player
15	FW	NED	Jan van 't Land
16	FW	NED	Tobias Bovelander
17	DF	NED	Teun Beins
18	DF	NED	Teun Hogenhout
23	DF	NED	Wiegert Schut
27	DF	ENG	Conor Williamson
28	DF	NED	Floris Wortelboer
31	FW	ARG	Bautista Capurro
32	GK	NED	Allard André de la Porte
33	GK	NED	Matthijs Odekerken

==== Women's squad ====
Head coach: Dave Smolenaars

As of 2 September 2022

No.	Pos.	Nation	Player
1	GK	NED	Danique Visser
2		NED	Maud Preyde
3	DF	NED	Laurien Boot
4	GK	NED	Mischa Timmerman
5		NED	Annelies Pos
6	DF	GER	Sonja Zimmermann
7	FW	NZL	Tyler Lench
8	FW	NED	Elke Boers
9		NED	Nine Rijna
10	FW	NED	Carmel Bosch
11		NED	Sterre Bregman

No.	Pos.	Nation	Player
12	MF	NED	Pien Tol
13	FW	NED	Ankelein Baardemans
14	FW	NED	Lilli de Nooijer
15	MF	NED	Teuntje Horn
16	DF	NED	Demi Hilterman
17	DF	NED	Fee Schreuder
18		NED	Noa van der Hurk
20		NED	Laurine Bout
22	FW	ARG	María José Granatto
23	FW	NED	Malou Nanninga

=== Notable players ===
==== Men's internationals ====
Netherlands

- Marc Benninga
- Floris Jan Bovelander
- Jaap-Derk Buma
- Jorrit Croon
- Cees Jan Diepeveen
- Theo Doyer
- Rogier Hofman
- Erik Jazet
- Wouter Jolie
- Karel Klaver
- Hendrik Jan Kooijman
- Teun de Nooijer
- Gert Jan Schlatmann
- Glenn Schuurman
- Jiske Snoeks
- Jaap Stockmann
- Macha van der Vaart
- Maurits Visser
- Diederik van Weel
- Remco van Wijk

Australia

- Jamie Dwyer
- Blake Govers

Belgium

- Arthur Van Doren

Germany

- Tibor Weißenborn
- Christopher Zeller
- Florian Fuchs

India

- Sardara Singh

Spain

- Rodrigo Garza

==== Women's internationals ====
Netherlands/Brazil

- Inge Vermeulen
- Danique Visser

Argentina

- Cecilia Rognoni
- Pilar Romang

Great Britain/England

- Helen Richardson-Walsh
- Kate Richardson-Walsh

Ireland

- Anna O'Flanagan
- Chloe Watkins
