= Linus Müller =

German field hockey player (born 1999)

Personal information
- Full name: Linus Albrecht Christoph Müller
- Born: 2 December 1999 (age 26) Düsseldorf, Germany
- Height: 1.73 m (5 ft 8 in)

Sport
- Sport: Field hockey
- Position: Defender
- Club: Mannheimer HC
Youth career
- Team
- –: Düsseldorfer HC
Senior career
Years	Team	Caps	Goals
–2018	Düsseldorfer HC	-	-
2018–present	Mannheimer HC	-	-
National team
Years	Team	Caps	Goals
2017–2019	Germany U21	17	-
2019–present	Germany	26	(1)
Medal record
Men's field hockey
Representing Germany
World Cup
Gold medal – first place	2026 Wavre/Amstelveen
EuroHockey Championship
Silver medal – second place	2021 Amstelveen
EuroHockey Junior Championship
Gold medal – first place	2019 Valencia
Bronze medal – third place	2017 Valencia

Linus Albrecht Christoph Müller (born 2 December 1999) is a German field hockey player who plays as a defender for Bundesliga club Mannheimer HC and the German national team.

He competed in the 2020 Summer Olympics. His father Albrecht Müller was an Olympic rower.

== Club career ==
Müller started playing hockey at age four at Düsseldorfer HC. In 2018 he signed for Mannheimer HC.
