= Loïck Luypaert =

Belgian field hockey player

Personal information
- Full name: Loïck Fanny Luypaert
- Born: 19 August 1991 (age 35) Edegem, Belgium
- Height: 1.81 m (5 ft 11 in)
- Weight: 78 kg (172 lb)

Sport
- Sport: Field hockey
- Position: Defender
- Club: Braxgata
Youth career
- Years: Team
- –2007: Braxgata
Senior career
Years	Team	Caps	Goals
2007–2009	Herakles	-	-
2009–2014	Dragons	-	-
2014–2015	Kampong	-	-
2015–present	Braxgata	-	-
National team
Years	Team	Caps	Goals
2012–2024	Belgium	315	(100)
Medal record
Men's field hockey
Representing Belgium
Olympic Games
Gold medal – first place	2020 Tokyo	Team
Silver medal – second place	2016 Rio de Janeiro	Team
World Cup
Gold medal – first place	2018 Bhubaneswar
Silver medal – second place	2023 Bhubaneswar–Rourkela
EuroHockey Championship
Gold medal – first place	2019 Antwerp
Silver medal – second place	2013 Boom
Silver medal – second place	2017 Amstelveen
Bronze medal – third place	2021 Amstelveen
Bronze medal – third place	2023 Mönchengladbach
Hockey World League
Silver medal – second place	2014–15 Raipur	Team
EuroHockey Junior Championship
Gold medal – first place	2012 's-Hertogenbosch

Loïck Fanny Luypaert (born 19 August 1991) is a Belgian field hockey player who plays as a defender for Braxgata. He played 315 matches for the Belgian national team from 2012 to 2024.

He combines his sports career with an educational program of Movement Science at the Vrije Universiteit Brussel.

== Club career ==
Luypaert started playing hockey at Braxgata. Between 2007 and 2009, he was active in Royal Herakles HC, in 2009 he moved to the KHC Dragons. In 2011, he won the Golden Stick (in the category junior male players), a Belgian award for year's best field hockey player. In 2014, he transferred to Kampong in Utrecht. After one year, he returned to Braxgata.

== International career ==
Luypaert became European champions with the Belgium U21 squad in 2012. He was selected for the 2012 Summer Olympics but was eventually omitted in the final selection. Luypaert became European vice-champion with Belgium at the 2013 European Championship on home ground in Boom, Belgium. He was a part of the Belgian squad that won the 2018 World Cup. In August 2019, he was selected in the Belgium squad for the 2019 EuroHockey Championship. They won Belgium its first European title by defeating Spain 5–0 in the final. On 25 May 2021, he was selected in the squad for the 2021 EuroHockey Championship. In January 2024 he announced that the 2024 Summer Olympics would be his last tournament with the national team.
