= Malte Hellwig =

German field hockey player

Personal information
- Born: 23 October 1997 (age 28) Germany

Sport
- Sport: Field hockey
- Position: Forward
- Club: Uhlenhorst Mülheim
National team
Years	Team	Caps	Goals
2016–2018	Germany U–21	43	(8)
2019–	Germany	30	(8)
Medal record
Men's field hockey
Representing Germany
Olympic Games
Silver medal – second place	2024 Paris	Team
World Cup
Gold medal – first place	2026 Wavre/Amstelveen
EuroHockey Championships
Gold medal – first place	2025 Mönchengladbach
EuroHockey Junior Championship
Bronze medal – third place	2017 Valencia

Malte Hellwig (born 23 October 1997) is a German field hockey player.

== Career ==
=== Club level ===
In club competition, Hellwig plays for Uhlenhorst Mülheim in the German Bundesliga.

=== Junior national team ===
Malte Hellwig made his debut for the German U–21 team in 2016. His first appearance was during a test series against England in Bisham.

In 2017, he won a bronze medal with the junior team at the EuroHockey Junior Championship in Valencia.

=== Die Honamas ===
Hellwig made his debut for Die Honamas in 2019, during season one of the FIH Pro League. Later that year he competed at the EuroHockey Championship in Antwerp.
