= Jip Janssen =

Dutch field hockey player (born 1997)

Personal information
- Born: 14 October 1997 (age 28) Naarden, Netherlands

Sport
- Sport: Field hockey
- Position: Defender
Youth career
- Team
- –: Naarden
- –: Kampong
Senior career
Years	Team	Caps	Goals
–present	Kampong	-	-
2024	Tamil Nadu Dragons	-	-
National team
Years	Team	Caps	Goals
2016–2018	Netherlands U21	9	(5)
2017–present	Netherlands	134	(79)
Medal record
Men's field hockey
Representing the Netherlands
Olympic Games
Gold medal – first place	2024 Paris	Team
World Cup
Bronze medal – third place	2023 Bhubaneswar–Rourkela
EuroHockey Championship
Gold medal – first place	2021 Amstelveen
Gold medal – first place	2023 Mönchengladbach
Silver medal – second place	2025 Mönchengladbach
Bronze medal – third place	2019 Antwerp

Jip Janssen (born 14 October 1997) is a Dutch field hockey player who plays as a defender for Hoofdklasse club Kampong and the Netherlands national team.

== Club career ==
In the Dutch Hoofdklasse, Janssen plays for SV Kampong. Before he joined Kampong he played in the youth ranks of Naarden.

== International career ==
=== Under–21 ===
In 2016, Janssen made his debut for the Netherlands U–21 side in a four nations tournament in Hannover, Germany.

Later that year, Janssen represented the side at the Junior World Cup in Lucknow, India. At the tournament, the Netherlands finished in seventh place.

=== Senior team ===
Janssen made his debut for the Netherlands senior national team in 2017, in a test match against South Africa in Cape Town. During the match, Janssen scored his first international goal in a 6–2 win.

After his debut, Janssen did not represent the Dutch side again until 2019 during the inaugural tournament of the FIH Pro League. Janssen scored three times during the league, helping the Netherlands to a bronze medal. Janssen won another bronze medal in 2019 at the EuroHockey Nations Championship in Antwerp.

== Honours ==
=== Club ===
Kampong

- Hoofdklasse: 2016–17, 2017–18, 2023–24
- Gold Cup: 2023–24
- Euro Hockey League: 2015–16, 2025–26

=== International ===
Netherlands

- Summer Olympics gold medal: 2024
- EuroHockey Championship: 2021, 2023
- FIH Pro League: 2021–22, 2022–23, 2024–25

=== Individual ===
- Hoofdklasse top goalscorer: 2023–24
