= 2022 Men's Euro Hockey League Ranking Cup =

Field hockey competition

2022 Euro Hockey League Ranking Cup
Tournament details
- Host country: Spain
- City: Terrassa
- Dates: 15–18 April 2022
- Teams: 8 (from 8 associations)
- Venue: Club Egara

Final positions
- Champions: (Spain) Club Egara
- Runner-up: (Germany) Mannheimer HC
- Third place: (Belgium) Waterloo Ducks

Tournament statistics
- Matches played: 12
- Goals scored: 77 (6.42 per match)
- Top scorer: (France) Victor Charlet (7 goals)

The 2022 Men's Euro Hockey League Ranking Cup is the second edition of the Men's Euro Hockey League Ranking Cup, a secondary competition to Europe's premier club field hockey tournament, the Euro Hockey League. The tournament, organized by the European Hockey Federation, will be held in Terrassa, Spain, from 15 to 18 April 2022.

== Format ==
As a secondary tournament to the Euro Hockey League, the Ranking Cup was created to determine the placings of the lower ranked teams for the 2020–21 EHL Season.

The tournament comprises 8 teams, competing in a knockout format. The victorious teams from the knockout matches advance to the thirteenth to sixteenth place playoffs, while the losing teams contested ranking matches to determine seventeenth to twentieth places.

== Results ==
=== Bracket ===
Quarter-finals
15 April
(Germany) Mannheimer HC (s.o.)	3 (5)
(England) Hampstead & Westminster	3 (4)
15 April
(Scotland) Grange	0
(Belgium) Waterloo Ducks	8
15 April
(Netherlands) Rotterdam	6
(Ireland) Three Rock Rovers	0
15 April
(Austria) Post SV	1
(Spain) Club Egara	8

Semi-finals
17 April
(Germany) Mannheimer HC (s.o.)	5 (5)
(Belgium) Waterloo Ducks	5 (3)
17 April
(Netherlands) Rotterdam	2 (2)
(Spain) Club Egara (s.o.)	2 (3)

Final
18 April
(Germany) Mannheimer HC	3
(Spain) Club Egara	4
Third place
18 April
(Belgium) Waterloo Ducks	5
(Netherlands) Rotterdam	1

=== Quarter-finals ===
15 April 2022
12:00

Post SV (Austria)	1–8	(Spain) Club Egara
Kaltenböck 14'	Report	Recasens 2', 3'; Gispert 18', 48'; Mercadé 20'; Soler 39'; Gil 42'; Prat 50'

Umpires:
Maarten Boxma (NED)
David Sweetman (SCO)

15 April 2022
14:15

Rotterdam (Netherlands)	6–0	(Ireland) Three Rock Rovers
Hoedemakers 13', 14'; Algera 27'; Hertzberger 36'; Van der Heijden 42', 45'	Report

Umpires:
Johannes Berneth (GER)
Diego Estebanez (ESP)

15 April 2022
16:30

Mannheimer HC (Germany)	3–3	(England) Hampstead & Westminster
Hinrichs 4'; Weigand 13'; Schachner 28'	Report	French 33'; Guise-Brown 41'; Marcano 60'
Penalties
Müller (penalty shoot-out scored); Hartkopf (penalty shoot-out scored); Weigand (penalty shoot-out missed); Kleinlein (penalty shoot-out missed); Barreiros (penalty shoot-out scored); Hartkopf (penalty shoot-out scored); Müller (penalty shoot-out scored)	5–4	(penalty shoot-out scored) Calnan; (penalty shoot-out scored) Shipperley; (penalty shoot-out scored) Marcano; (penalty shoot-out missed) Kaeppeler; (penalty shoot-out missed) Ramshaw; (penalty shoot-out scored) Calnan; (penalty shoot-out missed) Marcano

Umpires:
Michaël Pontus (BEL)
Alex Fedenczuk (SCO)

15 April 2022
18:45

Grange (Scotland)	0–8	(Belgium) Waterloo Ducks
	Report	Van Marcke 26'; Charlet 27', 32', 45', 45'; Willems 47'; Ghislain 59', 59'

Umpires:
Vincenzo Antonio Ilgrande (ITA)
Harry Collinson (ENG)

=== Fifth to eighth place classification ===
Semi-finals
16 April
(England) Hampstead & Westminster	2
(Scotland) Grange	1
16 April
(Ireland) Three Rock Rovers	5
(Austria) Post SV	2

Fifth place
18 April
(England) Hampstead & Westminster	7
(Ireland) Three Rock Rovers	1
Seventh place
18 April
(Scotland) Grange	3
(Austria) Post SV	0

==== 5–8th place semi-finals ====
16 April 2022
15:00

Three Rock Rovers (Ireland)	5–2	(Austria) Post SV
Johnson 4', 39', 42'; Canning 37'; Blakeney 40'	Report	Kaltenböck 13'; Scholz 41'

Umpires:
Vincenzo Antonio Ilgrande (ITA)
Alex Fedenczuk (SCO)

16 April 2022
17:45

Hampstead & Westminster (England)	2–1	(Scotland) Grange
Guise-Brown 55'; Ramshaw 60'	Report	Heigh 19'

Umpires:
Maarten Boxma (NED)
Diego Estebanez (ESP)

==== Seventh place game ====
18 April 2022
09:30

Grange (Scotland)	3–0	(Austria) Post SV
Rowling 15', 38'; Caughey 37'	Report

Umpires:
Michaël Pontus (BEL)
Maarten Boxma (NED)

==== 5th place game ====
18 April 2022
11:45

Hampstead & Westminster (England)	7–1	(Ireland) Three Rock Rovers
Ramshaw 5'; Shipperley 25'; French 26', 33'; Guise-Brown 44', 59'; Marcano 45'	Report	Blakeney 42'

Umpires:
Johannes Berneth (GER)
David Sweetman (SCO)

=== First to fourth place classification ===
==== Semi-finals ====
17 April 2022
12:00

Rotterdam (Netherlands)	2–2	(Spain) Club Egara
Hortensius 35'; Hertzberger 53'	Report	Recasens 1'; Aguilar 48'
Penalties
Menini (penalty shoot-out missed); Hertzberger (penalty shoot-out scored); Jansen (penalty shoot-out missed); Hoedemakers (penalty shoot-out scored); Hortensius (penalty shoot-out missed)	2–3	(penalty shoot-out scored) Gispert; (penalty shoot-out scored) G. Clapés; (penalty shoot-out missed) Broto; (penalty shoot-out missed) Torras; (penalty shoot-out scored) Recasens

Umpires:
Johannes Berneth (GER)
Michaël Pontus (BEL)

17 April 2022
14:15

Mannheimer (Germany)	5–5	(Belgium) Waterloo Ducks
Peillat 19', 45', 59'; Hartkopf 29'; Zmyslony 57'	Report	Van Marcke 1', 12'; Charlet 30', 32'; Ghislain 54'
Penalties
Müller (penalty shoot-out scored); Hartkopf (penalty shoot-out scored); Schachner (penalty shoot-out scored); Weigand (penalty shoot-out scored); Barreiros (penalty shoot-out scored)	5–3	(penalty shoot-out scored) Boccard; (penalty shoot-out missed) Ghislain; (penalty shoot-out scored) Van Oost; (penalty shoot-out scored) Charlet

Umpires:
David Sweetman (SCO)
Harrison Collinson (ENG)

==== Third place game ====
18 April 2022
14:00

Waterloo Ducks (Belgium)	5–1	(Netherlands) Rotterdam
Ghislain 2', 4'; Sidler 3'; Dumont 10'; Charlet 46'	Report	Schop 30'

Umpires:
Diego Estebanez (ESP)
Vincenzo Antonio Ilgrande (ITA)

==== Final ====
18 April 2022
16:15

Mannheimer (Germany)	3–4	(Spain) Club Egara
Peillat 7'; Hinrichs 42'; Hartkopf 46'	Report	Recasens 4', 36', 58'; Aguilar 8'

Umpires:
Harrison Collinson (ENG)
Alex Fedenczuk (SCO)

== Awards ==
Top Goalscorer	Player of the Tournament	Goalkeeper of the Tournament
(France) Victor Charlet	(Netherlands) Tjep Hoedemakers	(Spain) Albert Pérez

== Statistics ==
=== Final standings ===
Pos	Team	Pld	W	D	L	GF	GA	GD	Pts	Final result
1	(Spain) Club Egara (H)	3	2	1	0	14	6	+8	7	Gold medal
2	(Germany) Mannheimer	3	0	2	1	11	12	−1	2	Silver medal
3	(Belgium) Waterloo Ducks	3	2	1	0	18	6	+12	7	Bronze medal
4	(Netherlands) Rotterdam	3	1	1	1	9	7	+2	4	
5	(England) Hampstead & Westminster	3	2	1	0	12	5	+7	7	
6	(Ireland) Three Rock Rovers	3	1	0	2	6	15	−9	3	
7	(Scotland) Grange	3	1	0	2	4	10	−6	3	
8	(Austria) Post SV	3	0	0	3	3	16	−13	0	

Source: EHF
(H) Hosts

=== Top Goalscorers ===
Goalscoring Table
Pos.	Player	Club	FG	PC	PS	Total
1	(France) Victor Charlet	Waterloo Ducks	0	7	0	7
2	(Spain) Marc Recasens	Club Egara	0	6	0	6
3	(Belgium) William Ghislain	Waterloo Ducks	5	0	0	5
4	(South Africa) Matthew Guise-Brown	Hampstead & Westminster	0	3	1	4
4	(Germany) Gonzalo Peillat	Mannheimer	0	4	0	4
