= 2025–26 Women's Hoofdklasse Hockey =

Hoofdklasse
- Season: 2025–26
- Dates: 13 September 2024 – 10 May 2025
- Champions: Amsterdam
- Matches: 132
- Goals: 505 (3.83 per match)
- Top goalscorer: Frédérique Matla (Den Bosch); 24 goals
- Biggest home win: SCHC 8–0 Rotterdam (25 september 2025)
- Biggest away win: HGC 1–8 Amsterdam (19 October 2025); Tilburg 0–7 SCHC (26 October 2025)
- Highest scoring: Den Bosch 9–2 Tilburg (23 November 2025)
- All statistics correct as of 10 May 2026.

The 2025–26 Women's Hoofdklasse Hockey was the 45th season of the Women's Hoofdklasse Hockey, the top Dutch field hockey league. The season began on 13 September 2025 and concluded in May 2026.

Amsterdam claimed its 22nd title, after defeating the defending champions Den Bosch by 4–3 in a shoot-out, after the final of the championship playoffs had ended in 4–4 on aggregate.

== Teams ==
Women's Hoofdklasse 2025-26

Twelve teams compete in the league – the top nine teams of the previous season, the winner of the 2024–25 Promotieklasse and the two winners of the 2024–25 relegation play-offs. Bloemendaal won the 2024–25 Promotieklasse and replaced Huizen.

=== Accommodation and locations ===
Team	Location	Province	Accommodation
Amsterdam	Amstelveen	North Holland	Wagener Stadium
Bloemendaal	Bloemendaal	North Holland	Sportpark 't Kopje
Den Bosch	's-Hertogenbosch	North Brabant	Sportpark Oosterplas
HDM	The Hague	South Holland	Sportpark Duinzigt
HGC	Wassenaar	South Holland	De Roggewoning
Hurley	Amstelveen	North Holland	Amsterdamse Bos
Kampong	Utrecht	Utrecht	De Klapperboom
Oranje-Rood	Eindhoven	North Brabant	Sportpark Aalsterweg
Rotterdam	Rotterdam	South Holland	Hazelaarweg Stadion
Pinoké	Amstelveen	North Holland	Amsterdamse Bos
SCHC	Bilthoven	Utrecht	Sportpark Kees Boekelaan
Tilburg	Tilburg	North Brabant	Oude Warande

=== Teams by province ===
Province	Number of teams	Teams
North Holland	4	Amsterdam, Bloemendaal, Hurley, and Pinoké
South Holland	3	HGC, HDM, and Rotterdam
North Brabant	3	Den Bosch, Oranje-Rood, and Tilburg
Utrecht	2	Kampong and SCHC
Total	12	

== Regular season ==
=== Standings ===
Pos	Team	Pld	W	D	L	GF	GA	GD	Pts	Qualification or relegation
1	SCHC	22	17	5	0	79	19	+60	56	Qualification Euro Hockey League and play-offs
2	Den Bosch	22	16	2	4	60	26	+34	50	Qualification for the play-offs
3	Kampong	22	15	4	3	56	26	+30	49	Qualification for the play-offs
4	Amsterdam	22	15	3	4	76	25	+51	48	Qualification for the play-offs
5	Pinoké	22	8	6	8	39	42	−3	30	
6	HGC	22	6	4	12	35	56	−21	22	
7	Bloemendaal	22	5	7	10	28	40	−12	22	
8	Rotterdam	22	5	7	10	21	45	−24	22	
9	Hurley	22	5	5	12	33	43	−10	20	
10	HDM	22	6	1	15	27	57	−30	19	Qualification for the relegation play-offs
11	Oranje-Rood	22	4	6	12	23	59	−36	18	Qualification for the relegation play-offs
12	Tilburg	22	3	4	15	28	67	−39	13	Relegation to the Promotieklasse

Source: KNHB
Rules for classification: 1) points; 2) matches won; 3) goal difference; 4) goals for; 5) head-to-head result.

=== Results ===
Home \ Away	AMS	BLO	DBO	HDM	HGC	HUR	KAM	ORR	PIN	ROT	SCH	TIL
Amsterdam	—	4–1	1–2	7–1	3–2	4–3	2–3	6–0	2–2	7–0	0–1	2–3
Bloemendaal	0–2	—	0–2	1–2	1–1	1–1	0–2	1–3	2–2	1–1	3–4	4–1
Den Bosch	1–2	1–2	—	2–1	5–0	3–2	3–2	2–0	2–1	1–0	0–4	9–2
HDM	0–6	1–2	0–2	—	2–2	1–0	0–3	3–0	1–2	2–3	1–6	3–2
HGC	1–8	2–1	1–4	3–0	—	0–4	1–2	4–0	1–0	2–0	0–2	2–4
Hurley	1–3	1–2	1–4	5–1	3–1	—	2–3	1–1	0–2	0–1	0–2	4–2
Kampong	0–4	4–0	4–2	3–1	3–3	0–0	—	3–1	4–1	2–1	1–2	5–0
Oranje-Rood	1–6	0–0	0–6	2–1	2–4	2–2	0–3	—	3–3	2–1	2–2	2–2
Pinoké	1–3	2–2	1–3	1–2	2–1	2–0	1–1	2–1	—	2–2	0–6	5–2
Rotterdam	0–0	0–1	0–0	2–1	2–2	1–1	0–4	2–0	1–4	—	1–3	1–1
SCHC	2–2	3–2	2–2	2–0	4–0	7–1	2–2	5–0	3–0	8–0	—	2–2
Tilburg	0–2	1–1	0–4	1–3	4–2	0–1	0–2	0–1	0–3	1–2	0–7	—

Source: KNHB
Legend: Blue = home team win; Yellow = draw; Red = away team win.

=== Top goalscorers ===
Rank	Player	Club	FG	PC	PS	Goals
1	(Netherlands) Frédérique Matla	Den Bosch	10	12	2	24
2	(Netherlands) Yibbi Jansen	SCHC	2	19	1	22
3	(Netherlands) Jip Dicke	SCHC	17	3	0	20
4	(Netherlands) Imke Verstraeten	Amsterdam	0	10	4	14
4	(Netherlands) Trijntje Beljaars	Amsterdam	11	3	0	14
6	(Netherlands) Lana Kalse	Pinoké	9	2	1	12
6	(Netherlands) Joosje Burg	Den Bosch	12	0	0	12
6	(Netherlands) Demi Hilterman	HGC	0	11	1	12
6	(Netherlands) Pien Dicke	SCHC	9	3	0	12
10	(Netherlands) Katerina Langedijk	Amsterdam	6	4	1	11

Updated to 10 May 2026. Source: KNHB

== Play–offs ==
=== Bracket ===
Semi-finals
SCHC	2	1	3
Amsterdam (s.o.)	3	0	3
Den Bosch	1	3	4
Kampong	1	2	3

Final
Amsterdam (s.o.)	2	2	4
Den Bosch	2	2	4

=== Semi-finals ===
14 May 2026
16:00

Amsterdam	3–2	SCHC
Verstraeten 20'; Veen 41', 49'	Report	18' Dicke; 45' Winter

Wagener Stadium, Amstelveen

16 May 2026
16:00

SCHC	1–0	Amsterdam
Ruts 29'	Report
Penalties
Jansen (penalty shoot-out missed); De Geus (penalty shoot-out missed); Ruts (penalty shoot-out scored); Winter (penalty shoot-out missed)	1–3	(penalty shoot-out scored) Albers; (penalty shoot-out scored) Veen; (penalty shoot-out scored) Moes

Sportpark Kees Boekelaan, Bilthoven

14 May 2026
14:00

Kampong	1–1	Den Bosch
Fortuin 6'	Report	26' Matla

Sportpark Maarschalkerweerd, Utrecht

16 May 2026
14:00

Den Bosch	3–2	Kampong
Matla 39', 53'; Burg 59'	Report	27' De Kemp; 58' Hoctin Boes

Sportpark Oosterplas, 's-Hertogenbosch

=== Final ===
23 May 2026
12:45

Amsterdam	2–2	Den Bosch
Langedijk 24'; Van der Elst 54'	Report	45' Burg; 55' Joosten

Wagener Stadium, Amstelveen

25 May 2026
12:45

Den Bosch	2–2	Amsterdam
Wijckmans 15'; Englebert 56'	Report	37', 38' Verstraeten
Penalties
Sanders (penalty shoot-out scored); Matla (penalty shoot-out missed); Krekelaar (penalty shoot-out scored); Reijnen (penalty shoot-out missed); Englebert (penalty shoot-out missed); Sanders (penalty shoot-out scored); Matla (penalty shoot-out missed)	3–4	(penalty shoot-out scored) Albers; (penalty shoot-out missed) Veen; (penalty shoot-out missed) Moes; (penalty shoot-out scored) Van der Elst; (penalty shoot-out missed) Tellier; (penalty shoot-out scored) Van der Elst; (penalty shoot-out scored) Albers

Sportpark Oosterplas, 's-Hertogenbosch

== Relegation play-offs ==
The relegation play-offs will take place in May 2026.

=== Overview ===
Team 1	Agg.	Team 2	1st leg	2nd leg
HDM	2–1	Ring Pass Delft	1–0	1–1
Oranje-Rood	6–2	Nijmegen	3–1	3–1

=== Matches ===
30 May 2026
12:30

HDM	1–0	Ring Pass Delft
Walhof 19'	Report

Sportcomplex Groenendaal, The Hague

31 May 2026
12:30

Ring Pass Delft	1–1	HDM
Rozema 47'	Report	58' Walhof

Sportpark Hof van Delft, Delft

30 May 2026
12:30

Oranje-Rood	3–1	Nijmegen
Voermans 17'; Vasterink 30', 40'	Report	29' Heßler

Sportpark Aalsterweg, Eindhoven

31 May 2026
12:30

Nijmegen	1–3	Oranje-Rood
Heßler 11'	Report	8' Van der Loo; 13' Kho; 25' De Beer

Sportpark d'Almarasweg, Nijmegen

== See also ==
- 2025–26 Men's Hoofdklasse Hockey
