= 2026–27 Women's Hoofdklasse Hockey =

Hoofdklasse
- Season: 2026–27
- Dates: 27 September 2026 – 23 May 2027
- Matches: 60
- Goals: 243 (4.05 per match)
- Top goalscorer: Frédérique Matla (Den Bosch) (21 goals)
- Biggest home win: Den Bosch 9–0 Victoria (25 October 2026)
- Biggest away win: Victoria 0–8 Kampong (8 October 2026)
- Highest scoring: Bloemendaal 5–5 Pinoké (8 October 2026)
- All statistics correct as of 15 November 2026.

The 2026–27 Women's Hoofdklasse Hockey will be the 46th season of the Women's Hoofdklasse Hockey, the top Dutch field hockey league. The season began on 27 September 2026 and will conclude on 23 May 2027.

Amsterdam are the defending champions after claiming their 22nd title, defeating the defending champions Den Bosch by 4–3 in a shoot-out, after the final of the championship playoffs had ended in 4–4 on aggregate.

== Teams ==
Women's Hoofdklasse 2025-26

Twelve teams compete in the league – the top nine teams of the previous season, the winner of the 2025–26 Promotieklasse and the two winners of the 2025–26 relegation play-offs. Victoria won the 2025–26 Promotieklasse and replaced Tilburg.

=== Accommodation and locations ===
Team	Location	Province	Accommodation
Amsterdam	Amstelveen	North Holland	Wagener Stadium
Bloemendaal	Bloemendaal	North Holland	Sportpark 't Kopje
Den Bosch	's-Hertogenbosch	North Brabant	Sportpark Oosterplas
HDM	The Hague	South Holland	Sportpark Duinzigt
HGC	Wassenaar	South Holland	De Roggewoning
Hurley	Amstelveen	North Holland	Amsterdamse Bos
Kampong	Utrecht	Utrecht	De Klapperboom
Oranje-Rood	Eindhoven	North Brabant	Sportpark Aalsterweg
Rotterdam	Rotterdam	South Holland	Hazelaarweg Stadion
Pinoké	Amstelveen	North Holland	Amsterdamse Bos
SCHC	Bilthoven	Utrecht	Sportpark Kees Boekelaan
Victoria	Rotterdam	South Holland	Sportpark Kralingseweg

=== Teams by province ===
Province	Number of teams	Teams
North Holland	4	Amsterdam, Bloemendaal, Hurley, and Pinoké
South Holland	4	HGC, HDM, Rotterdam, and Victoria
North Brabant	2	Den Bosch, Oranje-Rood
Utrecht	2	Kampong and SCHC
Total	12	

== Regular season ==
=== Standings ===
Pos	Team	Pld	W	D	L	GF	GA	GD	Pts	Qualification or relegation
1	Den Bosch	10	10	0	0	38	2	+36	30	Qualification Euro Hockey League and play-offs
2	Amsterdam	10	8	1	1	34	7	+27	25	Qualification for the play-offs
3	SCHC	10	8	0	2	29	14	+15	24	Qualification for the play-offs
4	Hurley	10	5	2	3	18	10	+8	17	Qualification for the play-offs
5	Rotterdam	10	4	3	3	16	18	−2	15	
6	Kampong	10	4	2	4	28	18	+10	14	
7	Oranje-Rood	10	3	3	4	15	23	−8	12	
8	Bloemendaal	10	3	1	6	17	30	−13	10	
9	Pinoké	10	2	4	4	21	28	−7	10	
10	HDM	10	2	1	7	11	24	−13	7	Qualification for the relegation play-offs
11	HGC	10	2	1	7	10	27	−17	7	Qualification for the relegation play-offs
12	Victoria	10	0	0	10	6	42	−36	0	Relegation to the Promotieklasse

Updated to match(es) played on 15 November 2026. Source: KNHB
Rules for classification: 1) points; 2) matches won; 3) goal difference; 4) goals for; 5) head-to-head result.

=== Results ===
Home \ Away	AMS	BLO	DBO	HDM	HGC	HUR	KAM	ORR	PIN	ROT	SCH	VIC
Amsterdam	—	7–0	0–2					4–1			3–0	
Bloemendaal		—		1–0			0–3		5–5	3–2		3–1
Den Bosch		3–0	—				3–1		7–1	4–0		9–0
HDM	0–4		0–2	—		1–2		3–4			0–5	
HGC	0–4	4–3	0–5	0–1	—							
Hurley	2–3	2–1			1–1	—	3–0			0–1		4–0
Kampong	2–2				6–0		—	2–2	2–1		4–5	
Oranje-Rood			0–1		2–1	0–2		—				2–1
Pinoké	0–4			3–2		1–1		2–2	—		1–3	
Rotterdam				0–0	3–2		2–0	2–2	2–2	—	1–4	
SCHC		3–1	0–2		2–1	2–1		5–0			—	
Victoria	0–3			3–4	0–1		0–8		0–5	1–3		—

Updated to match(es) played on 15 November 2026. Source: KNHB
Legend: Blue = home team win; Yellow = draw; Red = away team win.

=== Top goalscorers ===
Rank	Player	Club	FG	PC	PS	Goals
1	(Netherlands) Frédérique Matla	Den Bosch	11	9	1	21
2	(Netherlands) Yibbi Jansen	SCHC	2	11	2	15
3	(Netherlands) Iris de Kemp	Kampong	11	1	0	12
4	(Netherlands) Imke Verstraeten	Amsterdam	0	7	1	8
5	(Belgium) Charlotte Englebert	Den Bosch	6	1	0	7
6	(Netherlands) Jip Dicke	SCHC	6	0	0	6
6	(Netherlands) Bente van der Veldt	Kampong	6	0	0	6
6	(Netherlands) Ankelein Baardemand	Bloemendaal	4	2	0	6
6	(Netherlands) Lana Kalse	Pinoké	2	0	4	6
6	(Netherlands) Maud van den Heuvel	SCHC	6	0	0	6

Matches updated to 19 November 2026. Source: KNHB

== See also ==
- 2026–27 Men's Hoofdklasse Hockey
