= 2024–25 Women's Hoofdklasse Hockey =

Hoofdklasse
- Season: 2024–25
- Dates: 14 September 2024 – 10 May 2025
- Champions: Den Bosch (23 titles)
- Relegated: Huizen
- Euro Hockey League: Den Bosch; SCHC
- Matches: 132
- Goals: 526 (3.98 per match)
- Top goalscorer: Frédérique Matla (Den Bosch) (22 goals)
- Biggest home win: Den Bosch 10–1 Huizen (4 May 2025)
- Biggest away win: Huizen 0–8 SCHC (16 March 2025)
- Highest scoring: Den Bosch 10–1 Huizen (4 May 2025)

The 2024–25 Women's Hoofdklasse Hockey was the 44th season of the Women's Hoofdklasse Hockey, the top Dutch field hockey league. The season began on 14 September 2024 and concluded on 29 May 2025 with the second match of the championship final.

Den Bosch were the defending champions. They defended their title by defeating SCHC 4–3 in a shoot-out after the final finished 2–2 on aggregate. It was a record-extending 23rd title for Den Bosch.

== Teams ==
Women's Hoofdklasse 2024-25

Twelve teams compete in the league - the top nine teams from the previous season, the winner of the 2023–24 Promotieklasse and the two winners of the 2023–24 relegation play-offs. Huizen won the 2023–24 Promotieklasse and replaced Bloemendaal.

=== Accommodation and locations ===
| Team | Location | Province | Accommodation |
|---|---|---|---|
| Amsterdam | Amstelveen | North Holland | Wagener Stadium |
| Den Bosch | 's-Hertogenbosch | North Brabant | Sportpark Oosterplas |
| HDM | The Hague | South Holland | Sportpark Duinzigt |
| HGC | Wassenaar | South Holland | De Roggewoning |
| Huizen | Naarden | North Holland | Sportpark Bestevaer |
| Hurley | Amstelveen | North Holland | Amsterdamse Bos |
| Kampong | Utrecht | Utrecht | De Klapperboom |
| Oranje-Rood | Eindhoven | North Brabant | Sportpark Aalsterweg |
| Rotterdam | Rotterdam | South Holland | Hazelaarweg Stadion |
| Pinoké | Amstelveen | North Holland | Amsterdamse Bos |
| SCHC | Bilthoven | Utrecht | Sportpark Kees Broekelaan |
| Tilburg | Tilburg | North Brabant | Oude Warande |

=== Teams by province ===
| Province | Number of teams | Teams |
|---|---|---|
| North Holland | 4 | Amsterdam, Huizen, Hurley, and Pinoké |
| South Holland | 3 | HGC, HDM, and Rotterdam |
| North Brabant | 3 | Den Bosch, Oranje-Rood, and Tilburg |
| Utrecht | 2 | Kampong and SCHC |
| Total | 12 | |

== Regular season ==
=== Standings ===
| Pos | Team | Pld | W | D | L | GF | GA | GD | Pts | Qualification or relegation |
|---|---|---|---|---|---|---|---|---|---|---|
| 1 | Den Bosch (C) | 22 | 19 | 2 | 1 | 73 | 18 | +55 | 59 | Qualification for the Euro Hockey League quarter-finals and the play-offs |
| 2 | SCHC | 22 | 18 | 3 | 1 | 80 | 19 | +61 | 57 | Qualification for the Euro Hockey League first round and the play-offs |
| 3 | Pinoké | 22 | 15 | 4 | 3 | 55 | 35 | +20 | 49 | Qualification for the play-offs |
| 4 | Amsterdam | 22 | 12 | 6 | 4 | 71 | 33 | +38 | 42 | Qualification for the play-offs |
| 5 | Kampong | 22 | 10 | 8 | 4 | 62 | 32 | +30 | 38 | |
| 6 | Tilburg | 22 | 8 | 3 | 11 | 31 | 52 | −21 | 27 | |
| 7 | Hurley | 22 | 6 | 7 | 9 | 35 | 35 | 0 | 25 | |
| 8 | HGC | 22 | 6 | 4 | 12 | 34 | 54 | −20 | 22 | |
| 9 | Oranje-Rood | 22 | 6 | 3 | 13 | 28 | 58 | −30 | 21 | |
| 10 | HDM (O) | 22 | 4 | 2 | 16 | 19 | 52 | −33 | 14 | Qualification for the relegation play-offs |
| 11 | Rotterdam (O) | 22 | 3 | 3 | 16 | 25 | 64 | −39 | 12 | Qualification for the relegation play-offs |
| 12 | Huizen (R) | 22 | 1 | 3 | 18 | 13 | 74 | −61 | 6 | Relegation to the Promotieklasse |

Source: Flashscore
Rules for classification: 1) points; 2) matches won; 3) goal difference; 4) goals for; 5) head-to-head result.
(C) Champions; (O) Play-off winners; (R) Relegated

=== Results ===
| Home \ Away | AMS | DB | HDM | HGC | HUI | HUR | KAM | OR | PIN | ROT | SCH | TIL |
|---|---|---|---|---|---|---|---|---|---|---|---|---|
| Amsterdam | — | 1–2 | 5–1 | 5–2 | 6–0 | 2–2 | 3–3 | 6–1 | 0–3 | 8–2 | 2–2 | 3–3 |
| Den Bosch | 1–0 | — | 6–0 | 6–1 | 10–1 | 4–2 | 4–1 | 5–1 | 6–1 | 1–0 | 1–1 | 4–1 |
| HDM | 2–3 | 0–1 | — | 1–3 | 1–0 | 0–4 | 1–2 | 1–0 | 2–5 | 2–2 | 0–1 | 1–2 |
| HGC | 1–7 | 1–2 | 0–0 | — | 5–0 | 1–2 | 1–5 | 0–2 | 1–1 | 3–2 | 2–2 | 0–1 |
| Huizen | 2–3 | 0–2 | 1–2 | 0–5 | — | 0–1 | 0–2 | 2–2 | 0–1 | 0–3 | 0–8 | 1–1 |
| Hurley | 1–2 | 2–2 | 2–0 | 1–1 | 5–0 | — | 3–3 | 1–2 | 1–2 | 2–1 | 1–2 | 1–2 |
| Kampong | 2–2 | 1–2 | 5–1 | 4–0 | 2–0 | 1–1 | — | 1–1 | 1–1 | 3–3 | 0–1 | 7–0 |
| Oranje-Rood | 0–2 | 0–3 | 1–0 | 1–2 | 1–1 | 2–1 | 2–7 | — | 2–6 | 6–3 | 1–6 | 0–1 |
| Pinoké | 1–1 | 3–2 | 4–1 | 2–1 | 4–2 | 2–0 | 1–1 | 2–0 | — | 4–1 | 1–3 | 3–1 |
| Rotterdam | 0–3 | 0–2 | 1–2 | 1–2 | 0–1 | 0–0 | 0–6 | 1–0 | 2–3 | — | 0–6 | 2–1 |
| SCHC | 2–0 | 0–2 | 2–1 | 6–1 | 8–2 | 5–1 | 3–1 | 5–0 | 5–2 | 7–0 | — | 1–0 |
| Tilburg | 0–7 | 1–5 | 2–0 | 3–1 | 2–0 | 1–1 | 2–4 | 2–3 | 2–3 | 2–1 | 1–4 | — |

Source: Flashscore
Legend: Blue = home team win; Yellow = draw; Red = away team win.

=== Top goalscorers ===
| Rank | Player | Club | FG | PC | PS | Goals |
|---|---|---|---|---|---|---|
| 1 | (Netherlands) Frédérique Matla | Den Bosch | 3 | 14 | 5 | 22 |
| 2 | (Netherlands) Yibbi Jansen | SCHC | 0 | 18 | 3 | 21 |
| 3 | (Argentina) Agustina Gorzelany | Amsterdam | 0 | 13 | 5 | 18 |
| 4 | (Netherlands) Imke Verstraeten | Pinoké | 0 | 10 | 5 | 15 |
| 4 | (Netherlands) Jip Dicke | SCHC | 11 | 4 | 0 | 15 |
| 6 | (Netherlands) Maud van den Heuvel | SCHC | 12 | 2 | 0 | 14 |
| 7 | (Netherlands) Sosha Benninga | Kampong | 9 | 3 | 0 | 12 |
| 7 | (Netherlands) Luna Fokke | Kampong | 5 | 7 | 0 | 12 |
| 9 | (Netherlands) Fiona Morgenstern | Amsterdam | 8 | 2 | 0 | 11 |
| 9 | (Netherlands) Bente van der Veldt | Kampong | 11 | 0 | 0 | 11 |
| 11 | (Netherlands) Joosje Burg | Den Bosch | 10 | 0 | 0 | 10 |
| 11 | (Scotland) Amy Costello | HGC | 0 | 8 | 2 | 10 |
| 11 | (Netherlands) Fay van der Elst | Amsterdam | 9 | 1 | 0 | 10 |
| 11 | (Netherlands) Pien Dicke | SCHC | 8 | 2 | 0 | 10 |

Updated to 10 May 2025. Source: KNHB

== Play-offs ==
=== Bracket ===
Semi-finals
Den Bosch | 3 | 3 | 6
Amsterdam | 2 | 0 | 2
SCHC | 5 | 1 | 6
Pinoké | 0 | 1 | 1

Final
Den Bosch (s.o.) | 1 | 1 | 2
SCHC | 1 | 1 | 2

=== Semi-finals ===
17 May 2025
15:00

| Amsterdam | 2–3 | Den Bosch |
|---|---|---|
| Norbiato 7'; Verschoor 21' | Report | Krekelaar 2'; Koolen 45'; Matla 55' |

Wagener Stadium, Amstelveen

18 May 2025
15:00

| Den Bosch | 3–0 | Amsterdam |
|---|---|---|
| Sanders 22'; De Wit 42'; Burg 44' | Report |

Sportpark Oosterplas, 's-Hertogenbosch

Den Bosch won 6–2 on aggregate.

17 May 2025
12:30

| Pinoké | 0–5 | SCHC |
|---|---|---|
| | Report | P. Dicke 6', 28'; Post 40'; Ruts 41'; Jansen 53' |

Amsterdamse Bos, Amstelveen

18 May 2025
12:30

| SCHC | 1–1 | Pinoké |
|---|---|---|
| Beljaars 58' | Report | Steensma 29' |

Sportpark Kees Boekelaan, Bilthoven

SCHC won 6–1 on aggregate.

=== Final ===
24 May 2025
16:00

| SCHC | 1–1 | Den Bosch |
|---|---|---|
| Van den Heuvel 34' | Report | Sanders 33' |

Sportpark Kees Boekelaan, Bilthoven

29 May 2025
12:45

| Den Bosch | 1–1 | SCHC |
|---|---|---|
| Fernig 6' | Report | Zandee 26' |
Penalties
| Sanders (penalty shoot-out scored); Matla (penalty shoot-out scored); B. Reijnen (penalty shoot-out scored); E. Reijnen (penalty shoot-out missed); Englebert (penalty shoot-out scored) | 4–3 | (penalty shoot-out scored) Van den Heuvel; (penalty shoot-out scored) De Geus; (penalty shoot-out missed) Jansen; (penalty shoot-out scored) Waard; (penalty shoot-out missed) Van Laarhoven |

Sportpark Oosterplas, 's-Hertogenbosch

2–2 on aggregate; Den Bosch won 4–3 in the shoot-out to win their 23rd national title.

== Relegation play-offs ==
The relegation play-offs took place on 31 May and 1 June 2025.

=== Overview ===
| Team 1 | Agg. | Team 2 | 1st leg | 2nd leg |
|---|---|---|---|---|
| HDM | 4–0 | Leonidas | 1–0 | 3–0 |
| Rotterdam | 4–4 | Nijmegen | 4–1 | 0–3 |

=== Matches ===
31 May 2025
12:30

| HDM | 1−0 | Leonidas |
|---|---|---|
| | Report |

Sportcomplex Groenendaal, The Hague

1 June 2025
12:30

| Leonidas | 0–3 | HDM |
|---|---|---|
| | Report | Walhof 23'; Van Hecking Colenbrander 34'; Beetsma 50' |

Sportpark Toepad, Rotterdam

31 May 2025
12:30

| Rotterdam | 4−1 | Nijmegen |
|---|---|---|
| Haarman 14'; Van den Dijssel 17', 37'; De Heer 51' | Report | Hessler 58' |

Hazelaarweg Stadion, Rotterdam

1 June 2025
12:30

| Nijmegen | 3–0 | Rotterdam |
|---|---|---|
| Bogers 1'; Vormeer 4'; Van Meteren 57' | Report |
Penalties
| Nguyen (penalty shoot-out missed); Verweijen (penalty shoot-out scored); Thijssen (penalty shoot-out missed); Krasenberg (penalty shoot-out missed) | 1–3 | (penalty shoot-out scored) Dijk; (penalty shoot-out missed) Omrani; (penalty shoot-out scored) Van Santbrink; (penalty shoot-out missed) Van den Dijssel; (penalty shoot-out scored) Boekhorst |

Sportpark d'Almarasweg, Nijmegen

== See also ==
- 2024–25 Men's Hoofdklasse Hockey
