= 2022–23 Women's Hoofdklasse Hockey =

Hoofdklasse
- Season: 2022–23
- Dates: 3 September 2022 – 29 May 2023
- Champions: Amsterdam (21st title)
- Relegated: Klein Zwitserland
- Matches: 132
- Goals: 474 (3.59 per match)
- Top goalscorer: Yibbi Jansen (SCHC) (23 goals)
- Biggest home win: SCHC 8–0 Kampong (4 September 2022); SCHC 8–0 Klein Zwitserland (8 October 2022)
- Biggest away win: Bloemendaal 1–9 Den Bosch (15 October 2022)
- Highest scoring: Bloemendaal 1–9 Den Bosch (15 October 2022)
- All statistics correct as of 29 May 2023.

The 2022–23 Women's Hoofdklasse Hockey was the 42nd season of the Women's Hoofdklasse Hockey, the top Dutch field hockey league. The season began on 3 September 2022 and concluded on 29 May 2023 with the third match of the championship final.

Amsterdam won the championship for the 21st title, after defeating SCHC with 2–3 in penalties. Both Amsterdam and Den Bosch now have 21 titles.

== Teams ==
2022–23 Women's Hoofdklasse teams

=== Accommodation and locations ===
Team	Location	Province	Accommodation
Amsterdam	Amstelveen	North Holland	Wagener Stadium
Bloemendaal	Bloemendaal	North Holland	Sportpark 't Kopje
Den Bosch	's-Hertogenbosch	North Brabant	Sportpark Oosterplas
HDM	The Hague	South Holland	Sportpark Duinzigt
HGC	Wassenaar	South Holland	De Roggewoning
Hurley	Amstelveen	North Holland	Amsterdamse Bos
Kampong	Utrecht	Utrecht	De Klapperboom
Klein Zwitserland	Eindhoven	South Holland	Sportpark Aalsterweg
HC Rotterdam	The Hague	South Holland	Sportpark Klein Zwitserland
Pinoké	Amstelveen	North Holland	Amsterdamse Bos
SCHC	Bilthoven	Utrecht	Sportpark Kees Boekelaan
Tilburg	Tilburg	North Brabant	Oude Warande

=== Number of teams by province ===
Province	Number of teams	Teams
North Holland	4	Amsterdam, Bloemendaal, Hurley and Pinoké
South Holland	4	HDM, HGC, Klein Zwitserland, and HC Rotterdam
North Brabant	2	Den Bosch and Tilburg
Utrecht	2	Kampong and SCHC
Total	12	

== Regular season ==
=== Standings ===
Pos	Team	Pld	W	D	L	GF	GA	GD	Pts	Qualification or relegation
1	SCHC	22	19	3	0	75	16	+59	60	Qualification for the Euro Hockey League and the play–offs
2	Den Bosch	22	17	3	2	59	19	+40	54	Qualification for the play–offs
3	Amsterdam	22	16	5	1	73	17	+56	53	Qualification for the Euro Hockey League and the play–offs
4	Hurley	22	12	2	8	35	33	+2	38	Qualification for the play–offs
5	Pinoké	22	7	8	7	32	38	−6	29	
6	Tilburg	22	8	3	11	23	36	−13	27	
7	HGC	22	7	5	10	36	37	−1	26	
8	Kampong	22	7	4	11	40	68	−28	25	
9	HDM	22	7	2	13	29	41	−12	23	
10	Bloemendaal	22	5	3	14	24	45	−21	18	Qualification for the relegation play–offs
11	Rotterdam	22	4	3	15	29	58	−29	15	Qualification for the relegation play–offs
12	Klein Zwitserland	22	2	1	19	19	66	−47	7	Relegation to the Promotieklasse

Source: Hoofdklasse Hockey Netherlands
Rules for classification: 1) points; 2) matches won; 3) goal difference; 4) goals for; 5) head-to-head result.

=== Results ===
Home \ Away	AMS	BLO	DBO	HDM	HGC	HUR	KAM	KZL	PIN	ROT	SCH	TIL
Amsterdam	—	3–1	2–0	3–1	3–2	5–1	3–0	6–0	2–2	3–0	1–1	7–0
Bloemendaal	0–4	—	1–9	3–2	2–3	1–2	1–2	1–2	0–0	2–1	0–3	2–0
Den Bosch	2–2	2–0	—	2–1	1–0	2–1	4–0	4–0	2–1	2–0	1–3	1–0
HDM	0–5	2–1	1–1	—	1–2	0–1	2–1	3–1	2–2	0–1	1–2	2–1
HGC	1–3	2–2	0–1	5–0	—	2–0	4–4	1–0	1–2	0–0	2–4	2–3
Hurley	0–0	2–1	1–4	3–1	2–0	—	3–1	4–0	2–1	2–1	1–3	2–3
Kampong	1–5	3–2	1–7	1–2	1–2	3–2	—	1–0	3–1	3–3	0–6	1–3
Klein Zwitserland	2–7	0–2	0–6	2–1	1–2	0–1	2–4	—	1–1	0–3	1–2	0–1
Pinoké	0–2	2–1	0–1	2–1	1–1	1–1	4–4	2–1	—	5–3	0–4	1–0
Rotterdam	0–5	0–1	0–2	1–4	4–3	1–2	3–5	4–3	1–1	—	1–7	2–3
SCHC	3–2	0–0	3–3	1–0	1–0	2–0	8–0	8–0	5–1	4–0	—	3–1
Tilburg	0–0	1–0	0–2	0–2	1–1	1–2	1–1	2–1	0–2	1–0	1–2	—

Source: Flashscore
Legend: Blue = home team win; Yellow = draw; Red = away team win.

=== Top goalscorers ===
Rank	Player	Club	FG	PC	PS	Goals
1	(Netherlands) Yibbi Jansen	SCHC	2	19	2	23
2	(Netherlands) Michelle Fillet	Amsterdam	12	5	1	18
2	(Netherlands) Frédérique Matla	Den Bosch	9	9	0	18
2	(Spain) Lola Riera	HGC	0	17	1	18
5	(Netherlands) Gitte Michels	Hurley	8	3	0	17
6	(Netherlands) Felice Albers	Amsterdam	10	3	0	13
7	(Netherlands) Annebregt Rietveld	Rotterdam	1	9	2	12
7	(Netherlands) Pien Dicke	SCHC	12	0	0	12
9	(Netherlands) Freeke Moes	Amsterdam	10	1	0	11
9	(Netherlands) Demi Hilterman	Bloemendaal	0	11	0	11
11	(Netherlands) Ginella Zerbo	SCHC	9	1	0	10
12	(Netherlands) Joosje Brug	Den Bosch	7	2	0	9
12	(Netherlands) Bente van der Veldt	Kampong	9	0	0	9
14	(Netherlands) Maartje Krekelaar	Den Bosch	5	3	0	8
14	(Netherlands) Luna Fokke	Kamping	3	5	0	8
14	(Netherlands) Maria Steensma	Pinoké	6	2	0	8
14	(Netherlands) Trijntje Beljaars	SCHC	6	2	0	8

== Play–offs ==
=== Bracket ===
Semi-finals
18–20 May 2023
SCHC	1	3
Hurley	0	1
18–20 May 2023
Den Bosch	1	0
Amsterdam	1	1

Final
27–29 May 2023
SCHC	2	2 (1)
Amsterdam	2	2 (4)

=== Semi-finals ===
18 May 2023
14:00

Hurley	0–1	SCHC
	Report	Jansen 1'

THC Hurley, Amstelveen

20 May 2023
16:00

SCHC	3–1	Hurley
Winter 22'; Jansen 51', 54'	Report	Loomans 46'

Sportpark Kees Boekelaan, Bilthoven

18 May 2023
12:00

Amsterdam	1–1	Den Bosch
Veen 35'	Report	Koolen 56'

Wagener Stadium, Amsterdam

20 May 2023
14:00

Den Bosch	0–1	Amsterdam
	Report	Plönissen 5'

Sportpark Oosterplas, 's-Hertogenbosch

=== Final ===
27 May 2023
14:00

Amsterdam	2–2	SCHC
Morgenstern 10', 40'	Report	Winter 18'; Jansen 57'

Wagener Stadium, Amsterdam

29 May 2023
12:45

SCHC	2–2	Amsterdam
Leurink 1'; Dicke 55'	Report	Van der Elst 11'; Van Gils 42'
Penalties
Jansen (penalty shoot-out missed); Fortuin (penalty shoot-out scored); Winter (penalty shoot-out missed)	1–4	(penalty shoot-out scored) Albers; (penalty shoot-out scored) Moes; (penalty shoot-out scored) Veen; (penalty shoot-out scored) Verschoor

Sportpark Kees Boekelaan, Bilthoven

== See also ==
- 2022–23 Men's Hoofdklasse Hockey
