= 2021–22 Women's Hoofdklasse Hockey =

Hoofdklasse
- Season: 2021–22
- Dates: 11 September 2021 – 21 May 2022
- Euro Hockey League: Den Bosch and Amsterdam
- Top goalscorer: Frédérique Matla (35 goals)
- Biggest home win: SCHC 6–0 Hurley
- Biggest away win: HGC 0–8 Den Bosch
- Highest scoring: Klein Zwitserland 2–7 Den Bosch

The 2021–22 Women's Hoofdklasse Hockey was the 41st season of the Women's Hoofdklasse Hockey, the top Dutch field hockey league. The season began on 11 September 2022 and concluded on 22 May 2022 with the third match of the championship final. Den Bosch won the title for a record 21st time.

== Teams ==
2022–23 Women's Hoofdklasse teams

=== Accommodation and locations ===
Team	Location	Province	Accommodation
Amsterdam	Amstelveen	North Holland	Wagener Stadium
Bloemendaal	Bloemendaal	North Holland	Sportpark 't Kopje
Den Bosch	's-Hertogenbosch	North Brabant	Sportpark Oosterplas
HDM	The Hague	South Holland	Sportpark Duinzigt
HGC	Wassenaar	South Holland	De Roggewoning
Hurley	Amstelveen	North Holland	Amsterdamse Bos
Kampong	Utrecht	Utrecht	De Klapperboom
Klein Zwitserland	The Hague	South Holland	Sportpark Klein Zwitserland
Oranje-Rood	Eindhoven	North Brabant	Sportpark Aalsterweg
Pinoké	Amstelveen	North Holland	Amsterdamse Bos
SCHC	Bilthoven	Utrecht	Sportpark Kees Boekelaan
Victoria	Rotterdam	South Holland	Victoria Sportcentrum

=== Number of teams by province ===
Province	Number of teams	Teams
North Holland	4	Amsterdam, Bloemendaal, Hurley and Pinoké
South Holland	4	HDM, HGC, Klein Zwitserland and Victoria
Utrecht	2	Kampong and SCHC
North Brabant	2	Den Bosch and Oranje-Rood
Total	12	

== Regular season ==
=== Standings ===
Pos	Team	Pld	W	D	L	GF	GA	GD	Pts	Qualification or relegation
1	Den Bosch	22	19	2	1	80	20	+60	59	Qualification for the Euro Hockey League and the play–offs
2	SCHC	22	16	6	0	55	18	+37	54	Qualification for the Euro Hockey League and the play–offs
3	Amsterdam	22	11	6	5	49	33	+16	39	Qualification for the play–offs
4	HDM	22	10	6	6	33	24	+9	36	Qualification for the play–offs
5	Pinoké	22	9	4	9	43	40	+3	31	
6	HGC	22	9	3	10	38	48	−10	30	
7	Hurley	22	7	8	7	34	42	−8	29	
8	Kampong	22	5	5	12	29	46	−17	20	
9	Bloemendaal	22	5	5	12	31	53	−22	20	
10	Klein Zwitserland	22	5	5	12	25	47	−22	20	Qualification for the relegation play–offs
11	Oranje-Rood	22	3	7	12	25	40	−15	16	Qualification for the relegation play–offs
12	Victoria	22	3	3	16	31	62	−31	12	Relegation to the Promotieklasse

Source: Flashscore
Rules for classification: 1) points; 2) matches won; 3) goal difference; 4) goals for; 5) head-to-head result.

=== Results ===
Home \ Away	AMS	BLO	DBO	HDM	HGC	HUR	KAM	KZL	ORR	PIN	SCH	VIC
Amsterdam	—	2–1	1–2	1–1	3–1	1–3	2–2	1–0	2–1	2–2	2–3	3–1
Bloemendaal	0–3	—	1–7	0–4	3–2	1–2	2–2	0–1	1–1	0–3	0–3	3–2
Den Bosch	4–2	4–0	—	1–0	3–1	4–2	3–0	1–1	4–0	3–1	0–1	4–0
HDM	0–0	2–1	1–4	—	3–0	2–1	2–1	2–2	1–0	1–3	0–1	5–2
HGC	1–1	3–1	0–8	3–2	—	1–2	3–4	2–0	1–0	3–1	2–4	3–0
Hurley	1–3	2–1	1–3	1–0	2–2	—	3–0	2–1	1–1	2–2	0–3	2–2
Kampong	1–2	2–3	1–5	1–1	1–2	2–2	—	1–2	1–2	2–1	1–2	2–2
Klein Zwitserland	0–7	2–3	2–7	1–1	2–1	1–1	0–1	—	1–2	0–3	1–2	3–2
Oranje-Rood	1–2	2–2	2–3	0–1	2–3	2–2	1–2	1–1	—	2–3	1–1	1–0
Pinoké	5–3	3–3	1–2	0–2	3–0	1–1	2–0	2–1	3–0	—	1–4	1–2
SCHC	2–2	1–1	2–2	0–0	1–1	6–0	3–0	3–0	3–1	3–1	—	3–0
Victoria	1–4	0–4	0–6	1–2	2–3	3–1	1–2	2–3	2–2	4–1	2–4	—

Source: Flashscore
Legend: Blue = home team win; Yellow = draw; Red = away team win.

=== Top goalscorers ===
Top Goalscorers
Rank	Player	Club	Goals
1	(Netherlands) Frédérique Matla	Den Bosch	35
2	(Netherlands) Yibbi Jansen	SCHC	26
3	(Netherlands) Demi Hilterman	Bloemendaal	17
4	(Netherlands) Ginella Zerbo	SCHC	13
5	(Netherlands) Gitte Michels	Hurley	11
6	(Netherlands) Pien van Nes	HDM	10
6	(Netherlands) Kari Stam	Pinoké	10
8	(Netherlands) Joosje Burg	Den Bosch	9
8	(Netherlands) Freeke Moes	Amsterdam	9
8	(Netherlands) Maartje Krekelaar	Den Bosch	9

== Play–offs ==
The semi-finals were held on 12, 14 and 15 May 2022 and the final was held on 19, 21 and 22 May 2022.

=== Bracket ===
Semi-finals
12–14 May 2022
Den Bosch	2	1
HDM	0	0
12–15 May 2022
SCHC	1 (3)	0	2 (3)
Amsterdam	1 (0)	2	2 (1)

Final
19–22 May 2022
Den Bosch	3	0	2
SCHC	1	1	1

=== Semi-finals ===
12 May 2022
20:30

HDM	0–2	Den Bosch
	Report	Van der Hoek 56'; Burg 57'

Sportpark Duinzigt, The Hague

14 May 2022
15:15

Den Bosch	1–0	HDM
Matla 70'	Report

Sportpark Oosterplas, 's-Hertogenbosch

Den Bosch won the series 2–0.

12 May 2022
18:30

Amsterdam	1–1	SCHC
Plönissen 67'	Report	Leurink 53'
Penalties
Verschoor (penalty shoot-out missed); Veen (penalty shoot-out missed); Moes (penalty shoot-out missed)	0–3	(penalty shoot-out scored) Jansen; (penalty shoot-out scored) Fortuin; (penalty shoot-out missed) Winter; (penalty shoot-out scored) De Geus

Wagener Stadium, Amstelveen

14 May 2022
13:15

SCHC	0–2	Amsterdam
	Report	Plönissen 15'; Veen 21'

Sportpark Kees Boekelaan, Bilthoven

15 May 2022
13:15

SCHC	2–2	Amsterdam
Jansen 20'; Zerbo 63'	Report	Albers 2'; Veen 36'
Penalties
Jansen (penalty shoot-out scored); Fortuin (penalty shoot-out missed); Winter (penalty shoot-out scored); De Geus (penalty shoot-out scored)	3–1	(penalty shoot-out scored) Albers; (penalty shoot-out missed) Verschoor; (penalty shoot-out missed) Moes; (penalty shoot-out missed) De Baat

Sportpark Kees Boekelaan, Bilthoven

SCHC won the series 2–1.

=== Final ===
19 May 2022
20:30

SCHC	1–3	Den Bosch
Jansen 68'	Report	Welten 27'; Matla 30'; Burg 37'

Sportpark Kees Boekelaan, Bilthoven

21 May 2022
12:45

Den Bosch	0–1	SCHC
	Report	Jansen 55'

Sportpark Oosterplas, 's-Hertogenbosch

22 May 2022
13:15

Den Bosch	2–1	SCHC
Van der Plas 37'; Matla 70'	Report	Zerbo 6'

Sportpark Oosterplas, 's-Hertogenbosch

Den Bosch won the series 2–1.
