= 2024–25 Men's Hoofdklasse Hockey =

Hoofdklasse
- Season: 2024–25
- Dates: 14 September 2024 – 11 May 2025
- Champions: Amsterdam (22nd title)
- Relegated: Nijmegen; SCHC
- Euro Hockey League: Bloemendaal; Amsterdam; Kampong
- Matches: 132
- Goals: 667 (5.05 per match)
- Best player: Floris Middendorp
- Top goalscorer: Timo Boers (Den Bosch) (28 goals)
- Biggest home win: Kampong 8–0 Nijmegen (9 November 2024)
- Biggest away win: Hurley 0–10 Rotterdam (16 March 2025)
- Highest scoring: Rotterdam 8–4 Nijmegen (27 April 2025)

The 2024–25 Men's Hoofdklasse Hockey, also known as the Tulp Hoofdklasse Men for sponsorship reasons, was the 52nd season of the Men's Hoofdklasse Hockey, the top Dutch field hockey league. It began on 14 September 2024 and will conclude in May 2025 with the second match of the championship final.

Kampong were the defending champions, winning their ninth national title by defeating Rotterdam 3–4 on aggregate in the 2023–24 championship final. They did not defend their title as they lost the final to Amsterdam 6–5 in a shoot-out after the final finished 5–5 on aggregate. Amsterdam won their 22nd title (first since 2011–12) equalling Bloemendaal's record.

== Teams ==
2024–25 Men's Hoofdklasse teams

Twelve teams compete in the league - the top nine teams from the previous season, the winner of the 2023–24 Promotieklasse and the two winners of the 2023–24 relegation play-offs. Nijmegen won the 2023–24 Promotieklasse and replaced Schaerweijde. Hurley and SCHC won the relegation play-offs and replaced HGC and Laren.

=== Accommodation and locations ===
Team	Location	Province	Accommodation
Amsterdam	Amstelveen	North Holland	Wagener Stadium
Bloemendaal	Bloemendaal	North Holland	Sportpark 't Kopje
Den Bosch	's-Hertogenbosch	North Brabant	Sportpark Oosterplas
HDM	The Hague	South Holland	Sportpark Duinzigt
Hurley	Amstelveen	North Holland	Amsterdamse Bos
Kampong	Utrecht	Utrecht	De Klapperboom
Klein Zwitserland	The Hague	South Holland	Sportpark Klein Zwitserland
Nijmegen	Nijmegen	Gelderland	Radboud Sportcentrum
Oranje-Rood	Eindhoven	North Brabant	Sportpark Aalsterweg
Pinoké	Amstelveen	North Holland	Amsterdamse Bos
Rotterdam	Rotterdam	South Holland	Hazelaarweg Stadion
SCHC	Bilthoven	Utrecht	Sportpark Kees Broekelaan

=== Personnel ===
Team	Trainer-coach	Captain
Amsterdam	(Netherlands) Rick Mathijssen	(Netherlands) Boris Burkhardt (Netherlands) Floris Middendorp
Bloemendaal	(Netherlands) Michel van den Heuvel	(Netherlands) Jorrit Croon (Netherlands) Floris Wortelboer
Den Bosch	(Netherlands) Nanco Jansonius	(Netherlands) Jasper Tukkers
HDM	(Netherlands) Pieter Pieterse	(Netherlands) Cédric de Gier (Netherlands) Sander Groenheijde
Hurley	(Argentina) Enzo Torossi	(Netherlands) Lex Tump
Kampong	(Netherlands) Tim Oudenaller	(Netherlands) Lars Balk (Netherlands) Jonas de Geus
Klein Zwitserland	(Argentina) Carlos Castaño	(Germany) Marco Miltkau (Netherlands) Koene Schaper
Nijmegen	(Netherlands) Rob Haantjes	(Netherlands) Luc de Rooij
Oranje-Rood	(Netherlands) Omar Schlingemann	(Netherlands) Joep de Mol
Pinoké	(Netherlands) Jesse Mahieu	(Netherlands) Jannis van Hattum
Rotterdam	(Netherlands) Erik van Driel	(Netherlands) Thijs van Dam
SCHC	(Netherlands) Jeroen Groenheijde	(Netherlands) Floris Steenman

=== Managerial changes ===
Team	Outgoing trainer-coach	Manner of departure	Date of vacancy	Position in the table	Incoming trainer-coach	Date of appointment
Bloemendaal	(Netherlands) Rick Mathijssen	Signed by Amsterdam	11 May 2024	Pre-season	(Netherlands) Michel van den Heuvel	12 May 2024
Amsterdam	(Netherlands) Taco van den Honert	End of contract	11 May 2024	Pre-season	(Netherlands) Rick Mathijssen	12 May 2024
HDM	(Netherlands) Erik van Driel	Mutual consent	11 May 2024	Pre-season	(England) Richard Smith	12 May 2024
Klein Zwitserland	(Netherlands) Omar Schlingemann	Signed by Oranje-Rood	11 May 2024	Pre-season	(Netherlands) Robert Justus	12 May 2024
Oranje-Rood	(Belgium) Jeroen Baart	End of contract	11 May 2024	Pre-season	(Netherlands) Omar Schlingemann	12 May 2024
Rotterdam	(Germany) Robin Rösch	Mutual consent	11 May 2024	Pre-season	(Netherlands) Erik van Driel	12 May 2024
Nijmegen	(Netherlands) Bas Bogaard	Mutual consent	11 May 2024	Pre-season	(Netherlands) Rob Haantjes	12 May 2024
HDM	(England) Richard Smith	Mutual consent	14 March 2025	9th	(Netherlands) Pieter Pieterse	14 March 2025
Klein Zwitserland	(Netherlands) Robert Justus	Mutual consent	10 May 2025	8th	(Argentina) Carlos Castaño	10 May 2025

=== Number of teams by province ===
Province	Number of teams	Teams
North Holland	4	Amsterdam, Bloemendaal, Hurley and Pinoké
South Holland	3	HDM, Klein Zwitserland and Rotterdam
Utrecht	2	Kampong and SCHC
North Brabant	2	Den Bosch and Oranje-Rood
Gelderland	1	Nijmegen
Total	12	

== Regular season ==
=== Standings ===
Pos	Team	Pld	W	D	L	GF	GA	GD	Pts	Qualification or relegation
1	Bloemendaal	22	17	2	3	80	33	+47	53	Qualification for the Euro Hockey League first round and the play-offs
2	Den Bosch	22	14	5	3	67	33	+34	47	Qualification for the play-offs
3	Amsterdam (C)	22	14	4	4	77	39	+38	46	Qualification for the Euro Hockey League quarter-finals and the play-offs
4	Kampong	22	13	5	4	66	36	+30	44	Qualification for the Euro Hockey League first round and the play-offs
5	Rotterdam	22	11	7	4	77	48	+29	40	
6	Oranje-Rood	22	11	5	6	67	57	+10	38	
7	Pinoké	22	10	2	10	64	45	+19	32	
8	Klein Zwitserland	22	7	4	11	36	52	−16	25	
9	HDM	22	4	4	14	41	69	−28	16	
10	SCHC (R)	22	4	4	14	37	61	−24	13 (Note: SCHC received a three-point deduction for fielding an ineligible player in the game against Kampong.)	Qualification for the relegation play-offs
11	Hurley (O)	22	2	3	17	23	101	−78	9	Qualification for the relegation play-offs
12	Nijmegen (R)	22	1	3	18	32	93	−61	6	Relegation to the Promotieklasse

Source: Flashscore
Rules for classification: 1) points; 2) matches won; 3) goal difference; 4) goals for; 5) head-to-head result.
(C) Champions; (O) Play-off winners; (R) Relegated

=== Results ===
Home \ Away	AMS	BLO	DB	HDM	HUR	KAM	KZ	NIJ	OR	PIN	ROT	SCH
Amsterdam	—	1–2	2–1	5–3	6–3	0–0	2–2	4–1	7–1	3–1	3–3	7–0
Bloemendaal	4–1	—	2–1	3–0	7–0	4–4	4–0	3–0	2–1	3–2	3–2	3–4
Den Bosch	3–0	2–2	—	5–2	8–1	2–2	3–1	3–1	2–2	2–1	4–1	4–1
HDM	1–6	2–7	1–2	—	1–1	0–5	2–2	3–1	2–4	2–3	2–2	2–1
Hurley	1–8	0–4	1–4	0–5	—	0–4	0–2	2–2	0–5	0–7	0–10	2–0
Kampong	2–4	1–3	3–1	2–0	4–2	—	4–1	8–0	4–1	3–2	3–3	3–1
Klein Zwitserland	1–3	3–2	0–3	3–1	1–1	2–2	—	4–0	1–0	1–2	0–4	3–0
Nijmegen	0–3	0–8	0–4	2–3	4–1	3–5	2–4	—	1–3	1–5	2–2	0–4
Oranje-Rood	3–2	2–3	4–4	6–4	5–1	3–2	4–1	5–4	—	4–3	4–4	3–2
Pinoké	1–3	2–3	2–4	5–3	4–1	1–2	5–2	8–1	2–2	—	3–1	1–1
Rotterdam	3–3	4–3	3–4	1–1	8–3	2–1	5–0	8–4	4–3	1–0	—	4–1
SCHC	3–4	1–5	1–1	3–1	2–3	1–2	3–2	3–3	2–2	2–4	1–2	—

Source: Flashscore
Legend: Blue = home team win; Yellow = draw; Red = away team win.

=== Top goalscorers ===
Rank	Player	Club	FG	PC	PS	Goals
1	(Netherlands) Timo Boers	Den Bosch	0	23	5	28
2	(Netherlands) Boris Burkhardt	Amsterdam	13	11	3	27
2	(Netherlands) Miles Bukkens	Pinoké	11	11	5	27
4	(Netherlands) Jeroen Hertzberger	Rotterdam	11	10	4	25
5	(Netherlands) Jip Janssen	Kampong	0	21	3	24
6	(Spain) Marc Miralles	Bloemendaal	1	13	5	19
7	(Australia) Nathan Ephraums	Bloemendaal	17	0	0	17
7	(Netherlands) Chris Taberima	HDM	0	12	5	17
9	(Belgium) Thibeau Stockbroekx	Oranje-Rood	16	0	0	16
9	(Netherlands) Joep Troost	Pinoké	6	8	2	16

Updated to 11 May 2025. Source: KNHB

== Play–offs ==
=== Bracket ===
Semi-finals
Den Bosch	2	3	5
Amsterdam	3	3	6
Bloemendaal	2	1	3
Kampong	5	3	8

Final
Amsterdam (s.o.)	3	2	5
Kampong	4	1	5

=== Semi-finals ===
17 May 2025
16:00

Kampong	5–2	Bloemendaal
Janssen 11', 14', 24', 33'; Gruter 22'	Report	Warmerdam 21'; Beins 38'

De Klapperboom, Utrecht

18 May 2025
16:00

Bloemendaal	1–3	Kampong
Miralles 21'	Report	Janssen 18', 49'; B. Phijffer 51'

Sportpark 't Kopje, Bloemendaal

Kampong won 8–3 on aggregate.

17 May 2025
18:00

Amsterdam	3–2	Den Bosch
Burkhardt 14'; Van Bijnen 16', 58'	Report	Boers 38'; Tukkers 42'

Wagener Stadium, Amstelveen

18 May 2025
18:00

Den Bosch	3–3	Amsterdam
Boers 15', 19'; Sorsby 27'	Report	Burkhardt 4', 29', 32'

Sportpark Oosterplas, Den Bosch

Amsterdam won 6–5 on aggregate.

=== Final ===
25 May 2025
16:00

Kampong	4–3	Amsterdam
Marree 4'; Janssen 35'; Gruter 40'; Telgenkamp 57'	Report	Burkhardt 1', 58'; Middendorp 33'

De Klapperboom, Utrecht

29 May 2025
16:00

Amsterdam	2–1	Kampong
Burkhardt 32'; Middendorp 33'	Report	Janssen 4'
Penalties
Middendorp (penalty shoot-out scored); D. Cassiem (penalty shoot-out missed); M. Cassiem (penalty shoot-out scored); Dommershuijzen (penalty shoot-out scored); Morton (penalty shoot-out scored); Middendorp (penalty shoot-out scored); M. Cassiem (penalty shoot-out scored)	6–5	(penalty shoot-out missed) De Geus; (penalty shoot-out scored) Pieters; (penalty shoot-out scored) De Vilder; (penalty shoot-out scored) Sprengers; (penalty shoot-out scored) Telgenkamp; (penalty shoot-out scored) Telgenkamp; (penalty shoot-out missed) Pieters

Wagener Stadium, Amstelveen

5–5 on aggregate; Amsterdam won 6–5 in the shoot-out to win their 22nd national title.

== Relegation play-offs ==
The relegation play-offs took place on 31 May and 1 June 2025.

=== Overview ===
Team 1	Agg.	Team 2	1st leg	2nd leg
SCHC	2–3	Schaerweijde	2–2	0–1
Hurley	5–5 (3–2 s.o.)	Tilburg	2–3	3–2

=== Matches ===
31 May 2025
16:00

SCHC	2–2	Schaerweijde
Hafkamp 3'; A. Empey 36'	Report	Stadelmaier 21'; Ros 53'

Sportpark Kees Boekelaan, Bilthoven

1 June 2025
16:00

Schaerweijde	1–0	SCHC
Stadelmaier 12'	Report

Sportpark Krakelingweg, Zeist

Schaerweijde won 3–2 on aggregate and were promoted to the Hoofdklasse, while SCHC were relegated to the Promotieklasse.

31 May 2025
16:00

Hurley	2–3	Tilburg
Aerts 53'; Voskuil 55'	Report	Van der Ruijt 17'; Haring 19'; Bornebroek 27'

Amsterdamse Bos, Amstelveen

1 June 2025
16:00

Tilburg	2–3	Hurley
Haring 47', 48'	Report	Aerts 41', 47'; Voskuil 55'
Penalties
	2–3

Oude Warande, Tilburg

5–5 on aggregate, Hurley won 3–2 in the shoot-out, and therefore both teams remained in their respective leagues.

== See also ==
- 2024–25 Women's Hoofdklasse Hockey
