= 2026–27 Men's Hoofdklasse Hockey =

Hoofdklasse
- Season: 2026–27
- Dates: 27 September 2026 – May 2027
- Matches: 60
- Goals: 253 (4.22 per match)
- Top goalscorer: Timo Boers (Den Bosch) (15 goals)
- Biggest home win: Bloemendaal 9–1 Schaerweijde (11 October 2026)
- Biggest away win: Schaerweijde 0–8 Amsterdam (18 October 2026)
- Highest scoring: Bloemendaal 9–1 Schaerweijde (11 October 2026)
- All statistics correct as of 19 November 2026.

The 2026–27 Men's Hoofdklasse Hockey, also known as the Staatsloterij Hoofdklasse Men for sponsorship reasons, is the 54th season of the Men's Hoofdklasse Hockey, the top Dutch field hockey league. The season began on 27 September 2026 and will conclude in May 2027 with the second match of the championship final.

The defending champions are Rotterdam, winning their second title by defeating Amsterdam 5–4 on aggregate.

== Teams ==
2025–26 Men's Hoofdklasse teams

Twelve teams compete in the league: the top nine teams from the previous season, the winner of the 2025–26 Promotieklasse and the two winners of the 2025–26 relegation play-offs. SCHC won the 2025–26 Promotieklasse and replaced Hurley. HDM and Tilburg won the relegation play-offs.

=== Accommodation and locations ===
Team	Location	Province	Accommodation
Amsterdam	Amstelveen	North Holland	Wagener Stadium
Bloemendaal	Bloemendaal	North Holland	Sportpark 't Kopje
Den Bosch	's-Hertogenbosch	North Brabant	Sportpark Oosterplas
HDM	The Hague	South Holland	Sportpark Duinzigt
Kampong	Utrecht	Utrecht	De Klapperboom
Klein Zwitserland	The Hague	South Holland	Sportpark Klein Zwitserland
Oranje-Rood	Eindhoven	North Brabant	Sportpark Aalsterweg
Pinoké	Amstelveen	North Holland	Amsterdamse Bos
Rotterdam	Rotterdam	South Holland	Hazelaarweg Stadion
SCHC	Bilthoven	Utrecht	Sportpark Kees Boekelaan
Schaerweijde	Zeist	Utrecht	Sportpark Krakelingsweg
Tilburg	Tilburg	North Brabant	Sportpark Oude Warande

=== Number of teams by province ===
Province	Number of teams	Teams
North Holland	3	Amsterdam, Bloemendaal, and Pinoké
South Holland	3	HDM, Klein Zwitserland, and Rotterdam
Utrecht	3	Kampong, Schaerweijde and SCHC
North Brabant	3	Den Bosch, Oranje-Rood and Tilburg
Total	12	

== Regular season ==
=== Standings ===
Pos	Team	Pld	W	D	L	GF	GA	GD	Pts	Qualification or relegation
1	Den Bosch	10	8	2	0	35	13	+22	26	Qualification Euro Hockey League and play-offs
2	Amsterdam	10	7	2	1	35	16	+19	23	Qualification play-offs
3	Kampong	10	6	2	2	26	14	+12	20	Qualification play-offs
4	Oranje-Rood	10	6	2	2	27	18	+9	20	Qualification play-offs
5	Bloemendaal	10	5	3	2	29	16	+13	18	
6	Pinoké	10	3	5	2	22	21	+1	14	
7	SCHC	10	3	3	4	16	22	−6	12	
8	Rotterdam	10	3	2	5	25	23	+2	11	
9	Klein Zwitserland	10	2	3	5	18	30	−12	9	
10	HDM	10	1	2	7	20	34	−14	5	Qualification relegation play-offs
11	Schaerweijde	10	1	1	8	13	34	−21	4	Qualification relegation play-offs
12	Tilburg	10	1	1	8	12	37	−25	4	Relegation to Promotieklasse

Updated to match(es) played on 19 November 2026. Source: Flashscore
Rules for classification: 1) points; 2) matches won; 3) goal difference; 4) goals for; 5) head-to-head result.

=== Results ===
Home \ Away	AMS	BLO	DB	HDM	KAM	KZ	OR	PIN	ROT	SCH	SCW	TIL
Amsterdam	—	2–2		4–1				2–1		2–2		5–0
Bloemendaal		—	2–2		1–2	3–2			3–1		9–1	
Den Bosch	4–2		—		0–0	8–1	3–0		4–3		3–1	
HDM		0–2	2–5	—	3–3				1–4		4–3	
Kampong					—	3–1	1–2		5–3	3–0	1–0	
Klein Zwitserland	1–3			2–2		—		3–3		2–0		3–3
Oranje-Rood	2–3	3–2		4–3		4–1	—					
Pinoké		2–2	2–3		3–2		1–1	—	0–0			
Rotterdam	3–4						1–2		—	5–2	2–2	3–0
SCHC		1–3		4–2			2–2	3–3		—		1–0
Schaerweijde	0–8					1–2		2–3		0–1	—	3–1
Tilburg			0–3	3–2	1–6		1–7	3–4				—

Updated to match(es) played on 19 November 2026. Source: KNHB
Legend: Blue = home team win; Yellow = draw; Red = away team win.

=== Top goalscorers ===
Rank	Player	Club	FG	PC	PS	Goals
1	(Netherlands) Timo Boers	Den Bosch	0	12	3	15
2	(Scotland) Struan Walker	Oranje-Rood	5	4	0	9
2	(Netherlands) Casper van der Veen	Bloemendaal	8	1	0	9
2	(Netherlands) Joep Troost	Pinoké	6	3	0	9
5	(Netherlands) Fabian Verzuu	HDM	7	1	0	8
5	(Netherlands) Jip Janssen	Kampong	0	7	1	8
5	(South Africa) Mustapha Cassiem	Amsterdam	5	2	1	8
5	(Netherlands) Duco Telgenkamp	Amsterdam	7	1	0	8
9	(Netherlands) Boris Burkhardt	Amsterdam	2	3	2	7
9	(Netherlands) Thierry Brinkman	Den Bosch	6	1	0	7

Updated to: 19 November 2026. Source: KNHB

== See also ==
- 2026–27 Women's Hoofdklasse Hockey
