= 2023 Women's Euro Hockey League =

Tournament details
- Host country: Netherlands
- City: Amstelveen
- Dates: 6–10 April
- Teams: 8 (from 6 associations)
- Venue: Wagener Stadium

Final positions
- Champions: (Netherlands) Den Bosch (2nd title)
- Runner-up: (Spain) Club de Campo
- Third place: (Germany) Düsseldorfer HC

Tournament statistics
- Matches played: 10
- Goals scored: 29 (2.9 per match)
- Top scorer(s): (Netherlands) Yibbi Jansen (Netherlands) Frédérique Matla (3 goals)

The 2023 Women's Euro Hockey League was the third edition of the Women's Euro Hockey League, Europe's premier women's club field hockey tournament, organized by the European Hockey Federation.

Amsterdam were the defending champions, having won their first title in the previous edition. They failed to qualify for this year's edition. The tournament was hosted by Pinoké at the Wagener Stadium in Amstelveen, Netherlands from 6 to 10 April 2023 alongside the men's Final8. The draw was held on 14 December 2022.

Den Bosch won their second EHL title by defeating Club de Campo 1–0 in the final.

== Association team allocation ==
A total of 8 teams from 6 of the 45 EHF member associations would participate in the 2023 EHL Women. The association rankings based on the EHL country coefficients were used to determine the number of participating teams for each association:

- Associations 1–2 each had two teams qualify.
- Associations 3–6 each had one team qualify.

=== Association ranking ===
For the 2023 Euro Hockey League, the associations were allocated places according to their 2021–22 EHL country coefficients, which takes into account their performance in European competitions from 2019–20 to 2021–22.

Association ranking
Rank	Change	Association	Points	Teams
1	Steady	Netherlands	39.000	2
2	Steady	Spain	24.750	2
3	▲2	Belgium	22.500	1
4	▼1	Germany	21.500	1
5	▼1	England	18.000	1
6	Steady	Ireland	9.750	1
7	▲1	France	4.750	0
8	New entry	Italy	4.500	0
9	▼2	Belarus	4.000	0
10	Steady	Ukraine	3.500	0
11	New entry	Switzerland	2.500	0
12	▼3	Russia	1.000	0

=== Teams ===
- (Netherlands) Den Bosch (1st)
- (Netherlands) SCHC (2nd)
- (Spain) Complutense (1st)
- (Spain) Club de Campo (2nd)
- (Belgium) Gantoise (1st)
- (Germany) Düsseldorfer HC (1st)
- (England) Surbiton (1st)
- (Ireland) Pembroke Wanderers (1st)

== Results ==
=== Bracket ===
Quarter-finals
7 April
(Netherlands) Den Bosch (s.o.)	1 (3)
(Netherlands) SCHC	1 (2)
7 April
(England) Surbiton	1 (1)
(Germany) Düsseldorfer HC (s.o.)	1 (3)
6 April
(Belgium) Gantoise	0
(Spain) Club de Campo	3
6 April
(Ireland) Pembroke Wanderers	0
(Spain) Complutense	4

Semi-finals
9 April
(Netherlands) Den Bosch	2
(Germany) Düsseldorfer HC	1
8 April
(Spain) Club de Campo	2
(Spain) Complutense	0

Final
10 April
(Netherlands) Den Bosch	1
(Spain) Club de Campo	0
Third place
10 April
(Germany) Düsseldorfer HC	3
(Spain) Complutense	0

=== Quarter-finals ===
6 April 2023
12:30

Pembroke Wanderers (Ireland)	0–4	(Spain) Complutense
	Report	M. García 3'; Carmona 14'; Jiménez 35'; Teruggi 58'

Umpires:
Harry Collinson (ENG)
Ymkje van Slooten (NED)

6 April 2023
14:45

Gantoise (Belgium)	0–3	(Spain) Club de Campo
	Report	Gil 11'; Torres-Quevedo 17'; Abajo 54'

Umpires:
Hannah Harrison (ENG)
Alison Keogh (IRL)

7 April 2023
11:45

Surbiton (England)	1–1	(Germany) Düsseldorfer HC
Elliott 16'	Report	Nolte 48'
Penalties
Hamilton (penalty shoot-out missed); Bourne (penalty shoot-out missed); Petter (penalty shoot-out scored); Elliott (penalty shoot-out missed)	1–3	(penalty shoot-out missed) Stoffelsma; (penalty shoot-out missed) Gräve; (penalty shoot-out scored) Strauss; (penalty shoot-out scored) Albertario; (penalty shoot-out scored) Nolte

Umpires:
Gema Calderon (ES)
Alison Keogh (IRL)

7 April 2023
20:15

Den Bosch (Netherlands)	1–1	(Netherlands) SCHC
Nunnink 32'	Report	Jansen 37'
Penalties
Sanders (penalty shoot-out missed); Matla (penalty shoot-out scored); Krekelaar (penalty shoot-out scored); Omrani (penalty shoot-out scored)	3–2	(penalty shoot-out missed) Jansen; (penalty shoot-out missed) Fortuin; (penalty shoot-out scored) Winter; (penalty shoot-out scored) De Geus; (penalty shoot-out missed) De Waard

Umpires:
Celine Martin-Schmets (BEL)
Hannah Harrison (ENG)

=== Ranking matches ===
8 April 2023
09:15

Gantoise (Belgium)	4–1	(Ireland) Pembroke Wanderers
Sinia 1'; Gerniers 1'; Ballenghien 50', 60'	Report	O'Brien 59'

Umpires:
Gema Calderon (ESP)
Ymkje van Slooten (NED)

9 April 2023
09:15

SCHC (Netherlands)	3–1	(England) Surbiton
Leurink 18'; Jansen 27', 46'	Report	Bourne 15'

Umpires:
Gema Calderon (ESP)
Tim Meissner (GER)

=== Semi-finals ===
8 April 2023
16:00

Club de Campo (Spain)	2–0	(Spain) Complutense
Barrios 18'; Magaz 53'	Report

Umpires:
Paul van den Assum (NED)
Celine Martin-Schmets (BEL)

9 April 2023
11:30

Den Bosch (Netherlands)	2–1	(Germany) Düsseldorfer HC
Matla 28', 58'	Report	Strauss 25'

Umpires:
Alison Keogh (IRL)
Laurine Delforge (BEL)

=== Third and fourth place ===
10 April 2023
09:15

Düsseldorfer HC (Germany)	3–0	(Spain) Complutense
Albertario 36', 58'; Strauss 54'	Report

Umpires:
Celine Martin-Schmets (BEL)
Ymkje van Slooten (NED)

=== Final ===
10 April 2023
13:45

Den Bosch (Netherlands)	1–0	(Spain) Club de Campo
Matla 46'	Report

Umpires:
Laurine Delforge (BEL)
Alison Keogh (IRL)

== See also ==
- 2022–23 Men's Euro Hockey League
- 2023 Women's EuroHockey Indoor Club Cup
