= Hockey in the Netherlands =

Hockey in the Netherlands may refer to:

== Field hockey ==
- Field hockey in the Netherlands
- Netherlands men's national field hockey team
- Netherlands women's national field hockey team

== Ice hockey ==
- Netherlands Ice Hockey Association
- Netherlands men's national ice hockey team
- Netherlands women's national ice hockey team
