= 2024 Women's Euro Hockey League =

Women's Euro Hockey League

Tournament details
- Host country: Netherlands
- City: Amstelveen
- Dates: 28 March – 1 April
- Teams: 8 (from 6 associations)
- Venue: Wagener Stadium

Final positions
- Champions: (Netherlands) Amsterdam (2nd title)
- Runner-up: (Germany) Mannheimer HC
- Third place: (Netherlands) SCHC

Tournament statistics
- Matches played: 10
- Goals scored: 38 (3.8 per match)
- Top scorer: Yibbi Jansen (SCHC) (4 goals)

The 2024 Women's Euro Hockey League was the fourth edition of the Women's Euro Hockey League, Europe's premier women's club field hockey tournament, organized by the European Hockey Federation.

Den Bosch were the defending champions, having won their second title in 2023. They failed to qualify for this year's edition. The tournament was hosted by Pinoké and Amsterdam and held alongside the men's Final8 at the Wagener Stadium in Amstelveen, Netherlands from 28 March to 1 April 2023.

The hosts Amsterdam won their second Euro Hockey League title by defeating Mannheimer HC 2–1 in the final. SCHC won their first EHL medal by defeating Junior FC 3–2 in the bronze medal match.

== Association team allocation ==
A total of 8 teams from 6 of the 45 EHF member associations participated in the 2024 Women's Euro Hockey League. The association rankings based on the EHL country coefficients were used to determine the number of participating teams for each association:

- Associations 1–2 each had two teams qualify.
- Associations 3–6 each had one team qualify.

=== Association ranking ===
For the 2024 Euro Hockey League, the associations were allocated places according to their 2020–2023 EHL country coefficients, which takes into account their performance in European competitions from 2020–21 to 2022–23.

Association ranking
Rank	Change	Association	Points	Teams
1	Steady	Netherlands	42,500	2
2	Steady	Spain	33,875	2
3	▲1	Germany	27,750	1
4	▼1	Belgium	25,750	1
5	Steady	England	20,500	1
6	Steady	Ireland	10,875	1
7	▲3	Ukraine	6,250	0
8	Steady	Italy	5,250	0
9	▲2	Switzerland	4,750	0
10	▼3	France	4,375	0
11	New entry	Czech Republic	2,500	0
12	▼3	Belarus	2,000	0
13	▼1	Russia	0,500	0

=== Teams ===
The number in the parentheses show each team's domestic league position of the previous season.

- (Netherlands) Amsterdam (1st)
- (Netherlands) SCHC (2nd)
- (Spain) Junior FC (1st)
- (Spain) Club de Campo (2nd)
- (Germany) Mannheimer HC (1st)
- (Belgium) Gantoise (1st)
- (England) East Grinstead (1st)
- (Ireland) Loreto (1st)

== Results ==
The draw was held on 13 December 2023 and the schedule was announced on 15 December 2023.

=== Bracket ===
Quarter-finals
29 March
(Netherlands) Amsterdam	3
(England) East Grinstead	1
29 March
(Netherlands) SCHC	2
(Belgium) Gantoise	1
28 March
(Germany) Mannheimer HC (s.o.)	1 (3)
(Spain) Club de Campo	1 (1)
28 March
(Ireland) Loreto	0
(Spain) Junior FC	5

Semi-finals
31 March
(Netherlands) Amsterdam	2
(Netherlands) SCHC	1
30 March
(Germany) Mannheimer HC	2
(Spain) Junior FC	0

Final
1 April
(Netherlands) Amsterdam	2
(Germany) Mannheimer HC	1
Bronze medal match
1 April
(Netherlands) SCHC	3
(Spain) Junior FC	2

=== Quarter-finals ===
28 March 2024
12:30

Loreto (Ireland)	0–5	(Spain) Junior FC
	Report	Granatto 26', 53'; Bosch 34', 44'; Gesti 38'

Umpires:
Kamile Mockaityte (LTU)
Sarah Wilson (SCO)

28 March 2024
17:00

Mannheimer HC (Germany)	1–1	(Spain) Club de Campo
Kurz 13'	Report	López García 60'
Penalties
Gerstenhöfer (penalty shoot-out scored); Kurz (penalty shoot-out scored); Felber (penalty shoot-out scored)	3–1	(penalty shoot-out missed) Iglesias; (penalty shoot-out scored) Pérez; (penalty shoot-out missed) García; (penalty shoot-out missed) López García

Umpires:
Rebecca Edwards (ENG)
Michael Dutrieux (BEL)

29 March 2024
15:30

SCHC (Netherlands)	2–1	(Belgium) Gantoise
Jansen 12', 34'	Report	Gerniers 20'

Umpires:
Sandra Adell (ESP)
Alison Keogh (IRL)

29 March 2024
20:00

Amsterdam (Netherlands)	3–1	(England) East Grinstead
Plönissen 14'; Albers 32'; Moes 57'	Report	Bray 47'

Umpires:
Laurine Delforge (BEL)
Kamile Mockaityte (LTU)

=== Ranking matches ===
30 March 2024
13:45

Club de Campo (Spain)	6–2	(Ireland) Loreto
Abajo 22', 42'; Iglesias 30'; Barrios 31'; Hofmeister 56'; García 58'	Report	O'Brien 37'; Pratt 53'

Umpires:
Paul Walker (ENG)
Lukasz Zwierzchowski (POL)

31 March 2024
10:15

East Grinstead (England)	2–1	(Belgium) Gantoise
Walker 19'; Mills 51'	Report	Ballenghien 41'

Umpires:
Lukasz Zwierzchowski (POL)
Kamile Mockaityte (LTU)

=== Semi-finals ===
30 March 2024
18:15

Mannheimer HC (Germany)	2–0	(Spain) Junior FC
F. Habif 36'; Heinz 55'	Report

Umpires:
Rebecca Edwards (ENG)
Alison Keogh (IRL)

31 March 2024
12:30

Amsterdam (Netherlands)	2–1	(Netherlands) SCHC
Verschoor 18'; Moes 25'	Report	Jansen 60'

Umpires:
Sandra Adell (ESP)
Sarah Wilson (SCO)

=== Bronze medal match ===
1 April 2024
09:15

SCHC (Netherlands)	3–2	(Spain) Junior FC
Winter 9'; Jansen 12'; Dicke 42'	Report	Granatto 28'; Oliva 47'

Umpires:
Rebecca Edwards (ENG)
Shane O'Donnell (IRL)

=== Final ===
1 April 2024
13:45

Amsterdam (Netherlands)	2–1	(Germany) Mannheimer HC
Moes 6'; Van der Elst 10'	Report	Gerstenhöfer 45'

Umpires:
Laurine Delforge (BEL)
Paul Walker (ENG)

== Top goalscorers ==
Rank	Player	Team	FG	PC	PS	Goals
1	(Netherlands) Yibbi Jansen	(Netherlands) SCHC	0	3	1	4
2	(Argentina) Victoria Granatto	(Spain) Junior FC	3	0	0	3
2	(Netherlands) Freeke Moes	(Netherlands) Amsterdam	2	1	0	3
4	(Spain) Lucía Abajo	(Spain) Club de Campo	2	0	0	2
4	(Spain) Laura Bosch	(Spain) Junior FC	2	0	0	2

== See also ==
- 2024 Women's EuroHockey Club Trophy I
- 2024 Women's EuroHockey Indoor Club Cup
