= Floris Middendorp =

Dutch field hockey player

Personal information
- Born: 4 June 2001 (age 25) Zwolle, Netherlands

Sport
- Sport: Field hockey
- Position: Midfielder / Forward
- Club: Amsterdam
Youth career
- Team
- –: Hattem
Senior career
| Years | Team | Caps | Goals |
| –2019 | Hattem | - | - |
| 2019–present | Amsterdam | - | - |
National team
| Years | Team | Caps | Goals |
| 2019–2022 | Netherlands U21 | 21 | (3) |
| 2022–present | Netherlands | 62 | (2) |
Medal record
Men's field hockey
Representing the Netherlands
Olympic Games
| Gold medal – first place | 2024 Paris | Team |
EuroHockey Championship
| Gold medal – first place | 2023 Mönchengladbach |
| Silver medal – second place | 2025 Mönchengladbach |
EuroHockey Junior Championship
| Gold medal – first place | 2022 Ghent |
| Bronze medal – third place | 2019 Valencia |

Floris Middendorp (born 4 June 2001) is a Dutch field hockey player who plays as a midfielder or forward for Hoofdklasse club Amsterdam and the Netherlands national team.

== Club career ==
Middendorp started playing hockey at Hattem, where he debuted in the first team when he was 15. In 2019 he moved to Amsterdam. He was named co-captain of the team with Boris Burkhardt for the 2024–25 season. He scored a goal in both matches of the 2024–25 championship final to help guide Amsterdam to its first league title in 13 years.

== International career ==
Initially Middendorp was not called up for the 2023 EuroHockey Championship, after Tjep Hoedemakers sustained an injury before the tournament, Middendorp was named as his replacement. He represented the Netherlands at the 2024 Summer Olympics where they won the gold medal in the field hockey tournament.

== Honours ==
=== Club ===
Amsterdam

- Hoofdklasse: 2024–25

=== International ===
Netherlands U21

- EuroHockey Junior Championship: 2022

Netherlands

- Summer Olympics gold medal: 2024
- EuroHockey Championship: 2023
- FIH Pro League: 2021–22, 2022–23, 2024–25

=== Individual ===
- Hoofdklasse Player of the Season: 2024–25
