= Women's Hoofdklasse Hockey =

Hoofdklasse
- Most recent season or competition: 2024–25 Women's Hoofdklasse Hockey
- Sport: Field hockey
- Founded: 1981; 45 years ago
- First season: 1981–82
- Administrator: KNHB
- No. of teams: 12
- Country: Netherlands
- Confederation: EHF (Europe)
- Most recent champion: Den Bosch (23rd title) (2024–25)
- Most titles: Den Bosch (23 titles)
- Broadcasters: NOS; Ziggo Sport
- Level on pyramid: 1
- Relegation to: Promotieklasse
- Domestic cup: Gold Cup
- International cup: Euro Hockey League

The Women's Hoofdklasse Hockey is the women's top division of field hockey in the Netherlands. The league ranks first in the European league ranking table. The league was established in 1981 and, prior to that, champions of several districts played in a championship pool to determine the national champion.

Den Bosch are the current champions, having won the 2024–25 season by defeating SCHC in the championship final. Den Bosch has the most titles with 23 followed by Amsterdam with 21.

== Format ==
The season starts in August or September of each year and is interrupted by the indoor hockey season from November to February. From March the outdoor season will be continued. The league is played by twelve teams who play each other twice and who compete for four spots in the championship play-offs. The number one and four and the number two and three play each other in the semi-final and the winners qualify for the final where the winner will be crowned champion. The last-placed team is relegated to the second division, the Promotieklasse. The eleventh-placed team plays in a relegation play-off against the runners-up of the Promotieklasse and the tenth-placed team plays a relegation play-off against the third-placed from the Promotieklasse. The winners of these matches will play the next season in the Hoofdklasse.

== Teams ==
Women's Hoofdklasse 2024-25

=== Accommodation and locations ===
Team	Location	Province	Accommodation
Amsterdam	Amstelveen	North Holland	Wagener Stadium
Den Bosch	's-Hertogenbosch	North Brabant	Sportpark Oosterplas
HDM	The Hague	South Holland	Sportpark Duinzigt
HGC	Wassenaar	South Holland	De Roggewoning
Huizen	Naarden	North Holland	Sportpark Bestevaer
Hurley	Amstelveen	North Holland	Amsterdamse Bos
Kampong	Utrecht	Utrecht	De Klapperboom
Oranje-Rood	Eindhoven	North Brabant	Sportpark Aalsterweg
Rotterdam	Rotterdam	South Holland	Hazelaarweg Stadion
Pinoké	Amstelveen	North Holland	Amsterdamse Bos
SCHC	Bilthoven	Utrecht	Sportpark Kees Broekelaan
Tilburg	Tilburg	North Brabant	Oude Warande

== List of champions ==
=== National champions (1920–1981) ===
No.	Season	Champions
1	1920–21	HOC (1)
2	1921–22	HOC (2)
3	1922–23	HOC (3)
4	1923–24	HOC (4)
5	1924–25	HOC (5)
6	1925–26	HOC (6)
7	1926–27	HOC (7)
8	1927–28	HOC (8)
–	1928–29	Not held
9	1929–30	HOC (9)
10	1930–31	HOC (10)
11	1931–32	HOC (11)
12	1932–33	HOC (12)
13	1933–34	HOC (13)
14	1934–35	HOC (14)
15	1935–36	BDHC (1)

No.	Season	Champions
16	1936–37	Amsterdam (1)
17	1937–38	Amsterdam (2)
18	1938–39	Rood-Wit (1)
–	1939–40	Not held
–	1940–41	Not held
–	1941–42	Not held
–	1942–43	Not held
–	1943–44	Not held
–	1944–45	Not held
19	1945–46	Rood-Wit (2)
–	1946–47	Not held
20	1947–48	HHIJC (1)
21	1948–49	Amsterdam (3)
22	1949–50	BDHC (2)
23	1950–51	BDHC (3)

No.	Season	Champions
24	1951–52	BDHC (4)
25	1952–53	Gooische (1)
26	1953–54	HHIJC (2)
27	1954–55	BDHC (5)
28	1955–56	Oranje Zwart (1)
29	1956–57	EMHC (1)
30	1957–58	BDHC (6)
31	1958–59	BDHC (7)
32	1959–60	Union (1)
33	1960–61	BDHC (8)
34	1961–62	BDHC (9)
–	1962–63	Not held
35	1963–64	BDHC (10)
36	1964–65	BDHC (11)
37	1965–66	EMHC (2)

No.	Season	Champions
38	1966–67	BDHC (12)
39	1967–68	EMHC (3)
40	1968–69	Oranje Zwart (2)
41	1969–70	Oranje Zwart (3)
42	1970–71	Amsterdam (4)
43	1971–72	Amsterdam (5)
44	1972–73	De Kieviten (1)
45	1973–74	Amsterdam (6)
46	1974–75	Amsterdam (7)
47	1975–76	Amsterdam (8)
48	1976–77	Were Di (1)
49	1977–78	Were Di (2)
50	1978–79	Amsterdam (9)
51	1979–80	Amsterdam (10)
52	1980–81	Amsterdam (11)

=== Hoofdklasse era (1981–present) ===
Season	Champions	Runners-up	Top goalscorer (Club)	Goals
1981–82	HGC (1)	Amsterdam	(Netherlands) Sandra Le Poole (Amsterdam)	31
1982–83	Amsterdam (12)	HGC	(Netherlands) Lisanne Lejeune (HGC)	21
1983–84	Amsterdam (13)	Hilversum	(Netherlands) Helen van der Ben (Amsterdam)	25
1984–85	HGC (2)	Amsterdam	(Netherlands) Lisanne Lejeune (HGC)	31
1985–86	HGC (3)	Hilversum	(Netherlands) Lisanne Lejeune (HGC)	38
1986–87	Amsterdam (14)	HGC	(Netherlands) Lisanne Lejeune (HGC)	46
1987–88	HGC (4)	Amsterdam	(Netherlands) Lisanne Lejeune (HGC)	34
1988–89	Amsterdam (15)	HGC	(Netherlands) Helen van der Ben (Amsterdam)	24
1989–90	HGC (5)	Amsterdam	(Netherlands) Helen van der Ben (Amsterdam)	22
1990–91	Amsterdam (16)	HGC	(Netherlands) Helen van der Ben (Amsterdam)	25
1991–92	Amsterdam (17)	HGC	(Netherlands) Wietske de Ruiter (HGC)	46
1992–93	HGC (6)	Amsterdam	(Netherlands) Wietske de Ruiter (HGC) (Netherlands) Mieketine Wouters (Amsterdam)	20
1993–94	Kampong (1)	MOP	(Netherlands) Frederiek Grijpma (Laren)	20
1994–95	Kampong (2)	HGC	(Netherlands) Wietske de Ruiter (HGC)	26
1995–96	HGC (7)	Kampong	(Netherlands) Wietske de Ruiter (HGC)	21
1996–97	HGC (8)	Amsterdam	(Netherlands) Suzan van der Wielen (HGC) (Netherlands) Mieketine Wouters (Amsterdam)	20
1997–98	Den Bosch (1)	Amsterdam	(Netherlands) Suzan van der Wielen (HGC) (South Africa) Pietie Coetzee (Amsterdam)	22
1998–99	Den Bosch (2)	Amsterdam	(Netherlands) Frederiek Grijpma (Amsterdam)	22
1999–2000	Den Bosch (3)	Amsterdam	(Netherlands) Ageeth Boomgaardt (Den Bosch)	25
2000–01	Den Bosch (4)	Rotterdam	(Netherlands) Mieketine Wouters (Laren)	25
2001–02	Den Bosch (5)	Rotterdam	(Netherlands) Mijntje Donners (Den Bosch)	36
2002–03	Den Bosch (6)	Laren	(Australia) Alyson Annan (Klein Zwitserland)	26
2003–04	Den Bosch (7)	Amsterdam	(Netherlands) Ageeth Boomgaardt (Den Bosch)	36
2004–05	Den Bosch (8)	Amsterdam	(Netherlands) Mijntje Donners (Den Bosch)	33
2005–06	Den Bosch (9)	Amsterdam	(Netherlands) Mijntje Donners (Den Bosch)	25
2006–07	Den Bosch (10)	Amsterdam	(Netherlands) Kim Lammers (Laren)	34
2007–08	Den Bosch (11)	Amsterdam	(Netherlands) Maartje Paumen (Den Bosch)	23
2008–09	Amsterdam (18)	Den Bosch	(Netherlands) Maartje Paumen (Den Bosch)	44
2009–10	Den Bosch (12)	Laren	(Netherlands) Maartje Paumen (Den Bosch)	27
2010–11	Den Bosch (13)	Laren	(Netherlands) Maartje Paumen (Den Bosch)	43
2011–12	Den Bosch (14)	Laren	(Netherlands) Kim Lammers (Laren)	40
2012–13	Amsterdam (19)	Den Bosch	(Netherlands) Maartje Paumen (Den Bosch)	37
2013–14	Den Bosch (15)	SCHC	(Netherlands) Maartje Paumen (Den Bosch)	29
2014–15	Den Bosch (16)	SCHC	(Netherlands) Maartje Paumen (Den Bosch)	32
2015–16	Den Bosch (17)	Amsterdam	(Netherlands) Maartje Paumen (Den Bosch)	31
2016–17	Den Bosch (18)	Amsterdam	(Netherlands) Maartje Paumen (Den Bosch)	23
2017–18	Den Bosch (19)	Amsterdam	(Netherlands) Pien van Nes (HDM) (Netherlands) Charlotte Vega (Amsterdam) (Netherlands) Caia van Maasakker (SCHC)	16
2018–19	Amsterdam (20)	Den Bosch	(Netherlands) Ginella Zerbo (SCHC)	24
2019–20	Cancelled due to the COVID-19 pandemic in the Netherlands.		(Netherlands) Frédérique Matla (Den Bosch)	25
2020–21	Den Bosch (20)	Amsterdam	(Netherlands) Frédérique Matla (Den Bosch)	24
2021–22	Den Bosch (21)	SCHC	(Netherlands) Frédérique Matla (Den Bosch)	35
2022–23	Amsterdam (21)	SCHC	(Netherlands) Yibbi Jansen (SCHC)	23
2023–24	Den Bosch (22)	SCHC	(Netherlands) Frédérique Matla (Den Bosch)	27
2024–25	Den Bosch (23)	SCHC	(Netherlands) Frédérique Matla (Den Bosch)	22
2025–26				

== Champions ==
=== By club ===
Club	Championships	Seasons won
Den Bosch	23	1997–98, 1998–99, 1999–2000, 2000–01, 2001–02, 2002–03, 2003–04, 2004–05, 2005–06, 2006–07, 2007–08, 2009–10, 2010–11, 2011–12, 2013–14, 2014–15, 2015–16, 2016–17, 2017–18, 2020–21, 2021–22, 2023-24, 2024-25
Amsterdam	21	1936–37, 1937–38, 1948–49, 1970–71, 1971–72, 1973–74, 1974–75, 1975–76, 1978–79, 1979–80, 1980–81, 1982–83, 1983–84, 1986–87, 1988–89, 1990–91, 1991–92, 2008–09, 2012–13, 2018–19, 2022–23
HOC	14	1920–21, 1921–22, 1922–23, 1923–24, 1924–25, 1925–26, 1926–27, 1927–28, 1929–30, 1930–31, 1931–32, 1932–33, 1933–34, 1934–35
BDHC	12	1935–36, 1949–50, 1950–51, 1951–52, 1954–55, 1957–58, 1958–59, 1960–61, 1961–62, 1963–64, 1964–65, 1966–67
HGC	8	1981–82, 1984–85, 1985–86, 1987–88, 1989–90, 1992–93, 1995–96, 1996–97
Oranje Zwart	3	1955–56, 1968–69, 1969–70
EMHC	3	1956–57, 1965–66, 1967–68
Kampong	2	1993–94, 1994–95
Were Di	2	1976–77, 1977–78
HHIJC	2	1947–48, 1953–54
Rood-Wit	2	1938–39, 1945–46
De Kieviten	1	1972–73
Union	1	1959–60
Gooische	1	1952–53

=== By province ===
Province	Championships	Clubs
North Holland	36	Amsterdam (21), BDHC (12), Rood-Wit (2), Gooische (1)
North Brabant	31	Den Bosch (23), Oranje Zwart (3), EMHC (3), Were Di (2)
South Holland	25	HOC (14), HGC (8), HHIJC (2), De Kieviten (1)
Utrecht	2	Kampong (2)
Gelderland	1	Union (1)

== Media coverage ==
Since 2015, almost every Sunday, one match from either the men's or the women's league is broadcast live by either Ziggo Sport or the NOS.

== See also ==
- Men's Hoofdklasse Hockey
