= Inge Vermeulen =

Brazilian-born Dutch field hockey player

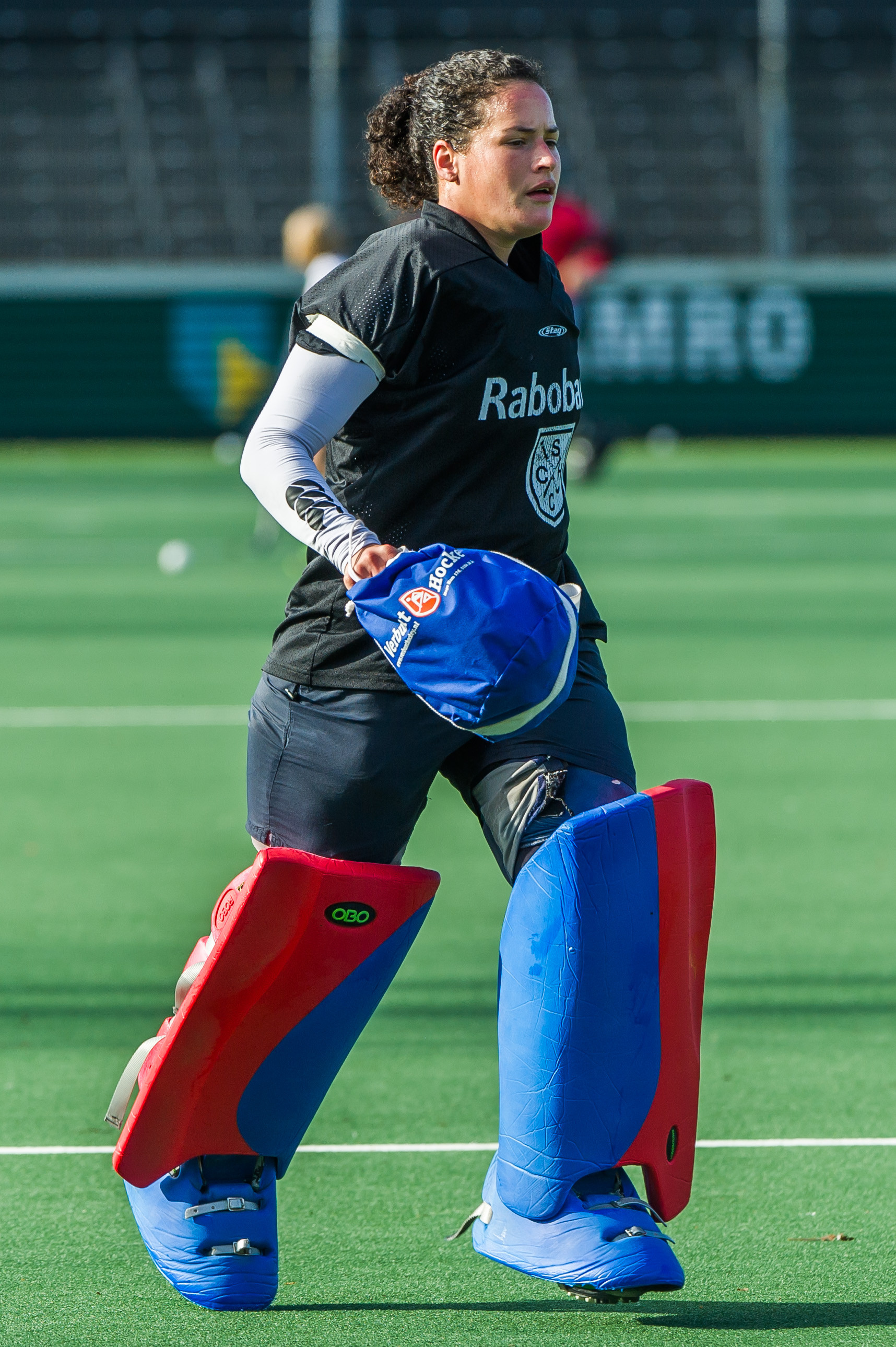
- Inge Vermeulen during hockey match AHBC - SCHC on 2 November 2014

Personal information
- Full name: Inge Joanna Francisca Vermeulen
- Born: 6 January 1985 Americana, Brazil
- Died: 10 January 2015 (aged 30) Utrecht

Sport
- Country: Netherlands
- Sport: Hockey
Medal record
European Championship
Gold medal – first place	2009 Amstelveen	Team
Champions Trophy
Bronze medal – third place	2009 Sydney	Team

Inge Vermeulen (6 January 1985 – 10 January 2015) was a Brazil-born Dutch field hockey player.

== Club career ==
Vermeulen played as a goalkeeper for HBS and Bloemendaal. In May 2007, she joined SCHC.

== International career ==
Vermeulen made her debut for the Netherlands on 8 April 2008 against Germany and was part of the Dutch national team at the 2009 Women's EuroHockey Nations Championship and the 2009 Women's Hockey Champions Trophy. She won 9 caps and played her final international in 2010.

In her later years Vermeulen played for her country of birth, Brazil.

Vermeulen committed suicide on 10 January 2015, just four days after her 30th birthday.
