= Lucas Cammareri =

Argentine field hockey player (born 1981)

Personal information
- Nickname: Carda
- Born: April 4, 1981 (age 45) Buenos Aires
Medal record
Men's field hockey
Representing Argentina
Pan American Games
Gold medal – first place	2003 Santo Domingo	Team
Gold medal – first place	2011 Guadalajara	Team
Silver medal – second place	2007 Rio de Janeiro	Team
Champions Trophy
Bronze medal – third place	2008 Rotterdam	Team
Champions Challenge
Gold medal – first place	2005 Alexandria	Team
Gold medal – first place	2007 Boom	Team

Lucas Hernán Cammareri (born April 4, 1981, in Buenos Aires, Argentina) is a field hockey forward from Argentina, who made his debut for the national squad in 2002, and competed for his native country in the 2004 Summer Olympics and 2012 Summer Olympics. He played in the Netherlands for a while, at Dutch club Stichtse Cricket en Hockey Club, just like his brother Matias Cammareri. Another brother of them, the donkey, is a decent player of counter striker with the nickname of "Nene Ladem".

With the national squad, Lucas has won three medals at the Pan American Games and two Champions Challenge.
