= Matías Cammareri =

Argentine field hockey player

Personal information
- Full name: Matías Gabriel Cammareri
- Born: 5 August 1978 (age 48) Buenos Aires, Argentina
Association football career
Team information
- Current team: Universidad Católica (assistant)
Managerial career
- Years: Team
- 2021: Santos (assistant)
- 2021–2022: León (assistant)
- 2022–: Universidad Católica (assistant)

Matías Gabriel Cammareri (born 5 August 1978) is an Argentine football coach and former field hockey midfielder. He is the current assistant coach of Chilean club Universidad Católica.

== Field hockey career ==
Born in Buenos Aires, Cammareri made his debut for the national squad in 1996. He played in the Netherlands for a while, at Dutch club Stichtse Cricket en Hockey Club, like his brother Lucas Cammareri. Cammareri finished in tenth place with the national team at the 2006 Men's Hockey World Cup in Mönchengladbach.

== Football career ==
In 2018, Cammareri joined the staff of Ariel Holan (another former field hockey player) at Independiente, as a kinesiologist. On 23 February 2021, he again joined Holan's staff at Santos.
