= Field hockey in the Netherlands =

- Country: Netherlands
- Governing body: Royal Dutch Hockey Federation
- National teams: Men's national team Women's national team

National competitions
- Men's Hoofdklasse Hockey; Women's Hoofdklasse Hockey

International competitions
- Summer Olympics; FIH Hockey World League; Indoor Hockey World Cup; Hockey World Cup

Field hockey in the Netherlands is a sport which has popular support in the country. There are 350,000 people who play for a variety of field hockey teams.

== History ==
In 1892 was the when field hockey was first played in the Netherlands. The Royal Dutch Hockey Federation the governing body for field hockey in the country.

== Domestic League ==
Hoofdklasse Hockey has a men's and women's professional field hockey leagues. The hockey season begins in two stages: from September to December and then March to June.

== National teams ==
The Dutch men's and women's national teams have enjoyed major success in international field hockey tournaments. The men's team has won 3 world championships and three times Olympic gold. The women's team has won 9 world championships and 5 gold medals at the Olympics (1984, 2008, 2012, 2021, 2024).

=== World Rankings ===
FIH World Rankings as of 18 June 2026.
Rank	Change	Team	Points
1	▲1	Belgium	3677.87
2	▼1	Netherlands	3643.33
3	▲1	England	3454.03
4	▼1	Australia	3349.18

FIH Women's World Rankings as of 11 June 2026.
Rank	Change	Team	Points
1	Steady	Netherlands	4126.83
2	Steady	Argentina	3667.02
3	Steady	Belgium	3430.41
