= Huizer Hockey Club =

Huizen
- Full name: Huizer Hockeyclub
- League: Men's Hoofdklasse; Women's Hoofdklasse
- Founded: 14 February 1970; 55 years ago
- Website: Club website
Home	Away

The Huizer Hockey Club is a medium-sized field hockey club in Naarden founded in 1970. Although close to the old village center of Huizen, the club is not located in this municipality but in the municipality of Gooise Meren.

The women currently play in the highest level of the Dutch hockey competition, de 2024–25 Women's Hoofdklasse Hockey.
