= Royal Dutch Hockey Association =

Governing body of field hockey in the Netherlands

Royal Dutch Hockey Association Koninklijke Nederlandse Hockey Bond
- Sport: Hockey
- Abbreviation: KNHB
- Affiliation: International Hockey Federation (FIH)
- Regional affiliation: Europe (EHF)

Official website
- www.knhb.nl
- (Netherlands)

The Royal Dutch Hockey Association (Dutch: Koninklijke Nederlandse Hockey Bond, KNHB) is the official governing body of field hockey in the Netherlands. It governs both the indoor and outdoor field hockey leagues, as well as the Netherlands national field hockey team and the Netherlands women's national field hockey team.

Originally, the association was also responsible for bandy in the Netherlands, but that sport is now governed by Bandy Bond Nederland.

== Origin ==
At its foundation in 1898 as the Nederlandsche Hockey & Bandy Bond (NHBB) in the Hotel Krasnapolsky in Amsterdam, the KNHB consisted of five clubs practicing field hockey as well as bandy. Bandy got sidelined quickly in the organisation's program due to the fact that because of the Dutch climate bandy could not be practised a lot. In 1909 six more clubs had joined the association and in 1919 the NHBB consisted of 29 clubs. A lot of new clubs emerged in the 1930s and the association consisted of almost a hundred clubs, which led to a name change in 1938 to Koninklijke Nederlandse Hockey Bond.

== Netherlands at international tournaments ==
Before 1928, there was a heavy debate on the rules of hockey in The Netherlands. A progressive side, with clubs from Haarlem and Amsterdam, quarreled with conservatives from The Hague, who used a different ball, had mixed teams, used a stick with two flat sides, and lacked a shooting circle. These rules were only used in The Netherlands, therefore, the Netherlands could not play international games, since other teams didn't understand the, in their eyes odd, rules. Because of their rules not being accepted by other teams, the Dutch national team could not participate in the 1920 Antwerp Olympics. The Netherlands became more and more isolated in hockey because of missing out on international hockey matches. The Netherlands almost could not participate in the 1928 Amsterdam Olympics since their rules were still different than those of most other countries. The association, then still called NHBB, was under pressure for possibly missing out on the Olympic tournament, which was hosted in its own country, and decided that the progressive rules were the standard rules used by the national team. The team made it to the final of the tournament (which was lost to British India) and since then, field hockey was popular in The Netherlands.

=== First World Cup ===
Although the first (men's) Hockey World Cup was held in Barcelona in 1971, there were plans to organise a World Cup as early as 1938. Then, the FIH planned to host a World Cup in Amsterdam, as a substitute for the Olympic hockey tournament, which was cancelled because there was not enough accommodation in Helsinki, where the 1940 Olympics were to be held. The tournament would take place from 2 to 13 May, in the Olympic stadium in Amsterdam and the associations of, amongst others, British India (consecutive winner of the three previous Olympic tournaments), Afghanistan, Japan, Argentina, New Zealand and many European countries had declared to participate. The women's tournament would last from 8 to 12 May and four countries participated: The Netherlands, Germany, South Africa and Australia. A few months after the outbreak of World War II in January, the tournament was called off.

=== National teams tournament records ===
Men's team tournament record
Tournament	No. of participations	1st place	2nd place	3rd place	4th place
Summer Olympics	17	2	4	3	4
World Cup	13	3	3	2	1
World League	2	1	-	-	1
Champions Trophy	33	8	7	8	6
Eurohockey Nations Championship	15	4	7	3	1
Intercontinental Cup	1	1	-	-	-
Rabobank Trophy	3	-	1	-	-
Sultan Azlan Shah Cup	1	1	-	-	-

Women's team tournament record
Tournament	No. of participations	1st place	2nd place	3rd place	4th place
Summer Olympics	8	3	1	3	-
World Cup	13	7	4	1	-
World League	2	1	-	-	-
Champions Trophy	19	6	4	9	-
Eurohockey Nations Championship	12	8	2	1	1

== Organisation ==
The KNHB headquarters are in Nieuwegein and have approximately 58 staff.

=== Organisation of competitions ===
The Dutch field hockey competitions are governed by the KNHB, the highest tier is called the Hoofdklasse. The association organises the following divisions, from highest level to lowest: Hoofdklasse, Promotieklasse, Overgangsklasse, Eerste Klasse, Tweede Klasse, Derde Klasse and Vierde Klasse. There are six districts:

- District Noord-Nederland (Northern Netherlands)
  - Groningen, Friesland, Drenthe
- District Oost-Nederland (Eastern Netherlands)
  - Overijssel, gelderland
- District Zuid-Nederland (Southern Netherlands)
  - Limburg, North Brabant, Zeeland
- District Noord-Holland
  - North Holland minus the Gooi region
- District Midden-Nederland (Middle Netherlands)
  - Flevoland, Utrecht, the Gooi region
- District Zuid-Holland
  - South Holland

Organisation of Dutch hockey competitions
Level	Division			
1	Men's and Women's Hoofdklasse			
2	Promotieklasse			
3	Overgangsklasse A		Overgangsklasse B	
4	Eerste Klasse A	Eerste Klasse B	Eerste Klasse C	Eerste Klasse D
5	Tweede Klasse A	Tweede Klasse B	Tweede Klasse C	Tweede Klasse D
6	Derde Klasse A	Derde Klasse B	Derde Klasse C	Derde Klasse D
7	Vierde Klasse			
