= NMHC Nijmegen =

Dutch field hockey club

Nijmegen
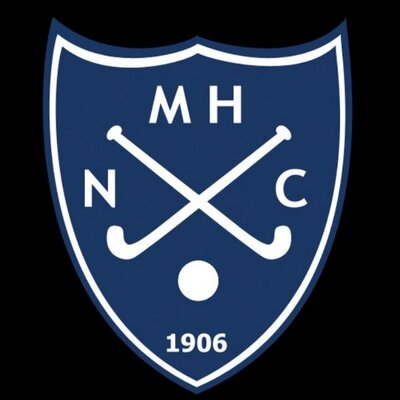
- Club logo
- Full name: Nijmeegse Mixed Hockey Club Nijmegen
- Short name: NMHC
- League: Men's Hoofdklasse
- Founded: 15 September 1906; 119 years ago

Personnel
- Members: 1,783
- Website: Cub website
Home

Nijmeegse Mixed Hockey Club Nijmegen, commonly known as Nijmegen, is a Dutch field hockey club based in Nijmegen, Gelderland. It was founded on 15 September 1906 and it has a total number of 1,783 members.

The first men's team compete's in the highest level of Dutch Field Hockey, the Hoofdklasse.

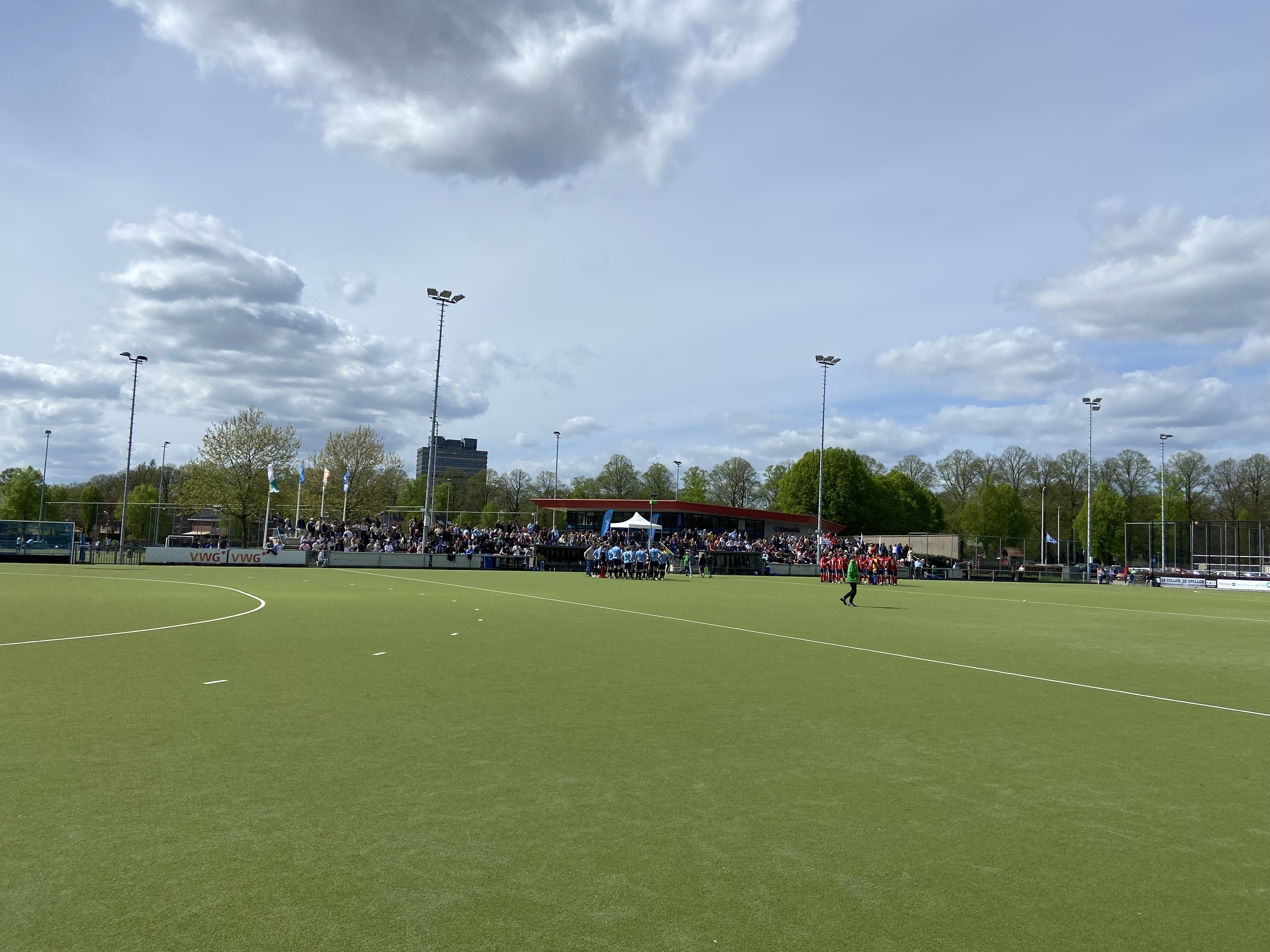
Nijmegen main field

== Players ==
=== Current squad ===
As of 13 September 2024

No.	Pos.	Nation	Player
1	GK	NED	Job Herrmann
3		NED	Niek Bijen
4		NED	Job de Man
5		NED	Luc de Rooij (Captain)
6		NED	Cas Leenen
7	DF	NED	Philip Jannes
8		NED	Jorn Gerritsen
9	FW	NED	Jim van de Venne
10	FW	NED	Tijn Stuve
11	FW	NED	David Blom
12	FW	AUS	Jacob Whetton

No.	Pos.	Nation	Player
13	FW	NED	Kars Schreuders
14	MF	NED	Pieter-Bas Noverraz
15		NED	Gijs van Lith
16		NED	Florian Gosselink
18	DF	AUS	Luca Brown
19	DF	NED	Lars Leenen
22	GK	NED	Rob Peters
23	MF	NED	Philip Herings
24	FW	NED	Kjell Bakker
32	GK	NED	Rolf Diederen

=== Famous players ===
- Janine Beermann
- Pietie Coetzee
- Eveline de Haan
- Jesse Mahieu
- Marsha Marescia
- Eefke Mulder
- Maud Mulder
- Hans Weusthof
- Roderick Weusthof
- Dylan Wotherspoon
