= HGC (field hockey) =

- Full name: HOC Gazellen Combinatie
- Nickname(s): De Gazellen (The Gazelles)
- League: Men's Hoofdklasse; Women's Hoofdklasse
- Founded: 22 September 1906; 119 years ago
- Home ground: De Roggewoning, Wassenaar
- Website: hgc.nl
Home	Away

H.O.C. Gazellen-Combinatie, also known as HGC, is a Dutch professional field hockey club located in Wassenaar, South Holland on the border of The Hague. The club was founded on 22 September 1906.

The first teams (men and women) competed for many years on the highest level of the Dutch field hockey league, in the "Hoofdklasse". In 1995/'96 both the men's and the women's first team won the national championship. The men's 1st XI also competed in the Euro Hockey League.

HGC has produced a number of internationals for the Dutch national teams as well as attracting a number of internationals from other countries.

== Honours ==
=== Men ===
Hoofdklasse

- Winners (2): 1989–90, 1995–96
- Runners-up (10): 1970–71, 1977–78, 1978–79, 1980–81, 1986–87, 1987–88, 1990–91, 1992–93, 2006–07, 2009–10

Euro Hockey League

- Winners (1): 2010–11
- Runners-up (1): 2007–08

European Cup

- Winners (1): 1997

Cup Winners' Cup

- Winners (2): 1992, 1993
- Runners-up (1): 1994

Hoofdklasse Indoor

- Winners (4): 1985–86, 1992–93, 1995–96, 1997–98

=== Women ===
Hoofdklasse

- Winners (8): 1981–82, 1984–85, 1985–86, 1987–88, 1989–90, 1992–93, 1995–96, 1996–97
- Runners-up (6): 1982–83, 1986–87, 1988–89, 1990–91, 1991–92, 1994–95

KNHB Cup

- Winners (1): 1996

European Cup

- Winners (7): 1983, 1984, 1985, 1986, 1987, 1991, 1994
- Runners-up (1): 1997

Cup Winners' Cup

- Winners (1): 1993

Hoofdklasse Indoor

- Winners (6): 1981–82, 1983–84, 1985–86, 1986–87, 2002–03, 2003–04

== Players ==
=== Current squad ===
==== Men's squad ====
As of 22 September 2023

No.	Pos.	Nation	Player
1	MF	NED	Karst Timmer
2	DF	IND	Devindar Walmiki
3		SUI	Boris Stomps
4	DF	ENG	Ollie Willars
5		NED	Pieter Schulpen
6	DF	NED	Vincent Langenhuijsen
7	FW	NED	Sam Figge
8		NED	Alexander Schop
9	MF	NED	Seve van Ass (Captain)

No.	Pos.	Nation	Player
10	MF	NED	Lucas Veen
11	FW	NED	Willem van Campen
13		NED	Casper Berkman
14	FW	NED	Jan van 't Land
17	MF	ESP	Marc Boltó
21	GK	NED	Daan Taphoorn
22	GK	NED	Sam van der Ven
24	DF	NED	Floris Benschop
26	MF	GER	Florian Scholten

==== Women's squad ====
Head coach: Robbert-Jan de Vos

As of 10 September 2021

No.	Pos.	Nation	Player
1	GK	NED	Anke van Goudoever
2	GK	NED	Ingeborg Dijkstra
3	MF	NED	Faye Muijderman
4		NED	Anne Eijsbouts
5	FW	ARG	Stefania Antoniazzi
6		NED	Lisa Lejeune
7		NED	Féline Engelkes
8	MF	NED	Isis van Loon
9	FW	ARG	Milagros Fernández Ladra
10		NED	Lisa Harteveld (Captain)
11	FW	NED	Sophie Schlatmann

No.	Pos.	Nation	Player
12	FW	RSA	Dirkie Chamberlain
13		NED	Zoe Hessels
14		NED	Julie Sytsema
15		NED	Amy van den Bosch
16		NED	Karlijn Scheepens
18	DF	ENG	Giselle Ansley
20		NED	Fleur Gort
21	FW	NED	Valérie van Aalst
22	DF	NED	Loes Stijntjes
24	MF	NED	Eva de Goede
29	MF	GER	Cécile Pieper

=== Notable players ===
==== Men's internationals ====
Netherlands

- Seve van Ass
- Roderik Bouwman
- Ronald Brouwer
- Jorrit Croon
- Marc Delissen
- Willemijn Duyster
- Wouter Leefers
- Bram Lomans
- Tycho van Meer
- Stephan Veen
- Guus Vogels

England/Great Britain

- Simon Egerton
- Ashley Jackson
- Iain Lewers
- Simon Mantell
- Barry Middleton

Spain

- Rodrigo Garza
- Roc Oliva
- Bosco Pérez-Pla
- Viçens Ruiz

Argentina

- Lucas Martínez
- Joaquín Menini
- Gonzalo Peillat
- Lucas Vila

Canada

- Ken Pereira
- Peter Short
- Rob Short
- David Yule

Ireland

- John Jermyn
- Iain Lewers
- Eugene Magee

New Zealand

- Phil Burrows
- Shea McAleese

Belgium

- Tanguy Cosyns

Japan

- Kenta Tanaka

==== Women's internationals ====
Netherlands

- Helen van der Ben
- Carina Benninga
- Marieke van Doorn
- Annemieke Fokke
- Noor Holsboer
- Femke Kooijman
- Nicole Koolen
- Lisanne Lejeune
- Sandra Le Poole
- Aletta van Manen
- Fatima Moreira de Melo
- Suzanne Plesman
- Caroline van Nieuwenhuyze-Leenders
- Wietske de Ruiter
- Florentine Steenberghe
- Suzan van der Wielen
- Laurien Willemse

Ireland

- Lizzie Colvin
