= Haagsche Delftsche Mixed =

hdm
- Full name: Haagse Hockeyvereniging Haagsche Delftsche Mixed
- League: Men's Promotieklasse; Women's Hoofdklasse
- Founded: 8 February 1908; 118 years ago

Personnel
- Members: 2488
- Website: Club website
Home	Away

Haagse Hockeyvereniging "Haagsche Delftsche Mixed", commonly known as hdm, is a Dutch professional field hockey club based in The Hague, South Holland.

The club was founded on 8 February 1908, when students from Delft wanted to play hockey with their girlfriends from The Hague. The first men's team won the Dutch national title in 1924, 1930, 1931, 1935, 1941, 1942, and for the last time in 1992. Currently, the first men's team competes in the Dutch second division, the Promotieklasse, the first women's team competes in the Dutch first division, the Hoofdklasse.

In both the competitions 2020-2021 and 2021-2022 the first women's team succeeded to enter the play-offs for the Championship, but did not succeed to reach the finals.

On 6 June 2022 the first men's team promoted back to the Dutch first division Hoofdklasse, after winning a play-offs trilogy (3-1) against SCHC (Stichtsche Cricket en Hockey Club Bilthoven).

== Honours ==
=== Men ===
National title / Hoofdklasse

- Winners (8): 1923–24, 1929–30, 1930–31, 1934–35, 1935–36, 1940–41, 1941–42, 1991–92
- Runners-up (5): 1918–19, 1922–23, 1942–43, 1945–46, 1994–95

Gold Cup

- Runners-up (1): 2021–22

KNHB Cup

- Winners (2): 1994, 1995

EuroHockey Cup Winners Cup

- Runners-up (2): 1995, 1996

Hoofdklasse Indoor

- Winners (5): 1994–95, 2005–06, 2010–11, 2022–23, 2025–26

EuroHockey Indoor Club Cup

- Runners-up (2): 2012, 2024

=== Women ===
KNHB Gold Cup

- Runners-up (1): 2017–18

Hoofdklasse Indoor

- Winners (5): 1976–77, 1977–78, 1980–81, 1984–85, 2018–19

EuroHockey Indoor Club Cup

- Runners-up (1): 2020

== Players ==
=== Current squad ===
==== Men's squad ====
As of 13 September 2024

No.	Pos.	Nation	Player
1	GK	GER	Luis Beckmann
3	FW	NED	Alexander Schop
4	DF	NED	Jelte Kaptein
5	DF	NED	Alexander Weterings
7	FW	NED	Ruben Versteeg
8	DF	NED	Jasper van der Looy
9	FW	NED	Yorben Fontaine
10	MF	NED	Merijn Maas
11	FW	NED	Fabian Verzuu
12	FW	ENG	Will Calnan
13	GK	NED	Siebe Pijpers

No.	Pos.	Nation	Player
14		NED	Lennart Kallenberg
15		RSA	Reuben Sendzul
16	MF	GER	Sören Bigalke
17	FW	ESP	Marc Boltó
18	MF	NED	Cédric de Gier (Captain)
19	DF	NED	Rick van den IJssel
21	MF	NED	Chris Taberima
23	DF	NED	Sander Groenheijde (Captain)
24	DF	NED	Tjeerd Boermans
25	FW	NED	Mats Dicke
26	MF	GER	Florian Scholten

==== Women's squad ====
Trainer-coach: Ivar Knotschke

As of 2 September 2022

No.	Pos.	Nation	Player
1	GK	NED	Julia Remmerswaal
3	FW	AUS	Stephanie Kershaw
4	DF	NED	Margot van Hecking Colenbrander
5	DF	NED	Tessa Clasener (Captain)
6		NED	Jip Blaas
8		NED	Anke Sanders
9		NED	Lotte Beetsma
10	FW	NED	Jip Dicke
11	DF	NED	Pien van Nes
12	FW	NED	Tessa Beetsma

No.	Pos.	Nation	Player
13	MF	NED	Eva van 't Hoog
14	FW	NED	Belén van den Broek
15	MF	NED	Marieke de Haas
18		NED	Mira van den Berg
20		NED	Imme van Es
21	DF	NED	Nora Bruinsma
22	MF	USA	Ashley Hoffman
23		NED	Faye Janse
24	FW	NED	Pien van der Heide
25	GK	NED	Joyce Litzouw

=== Notable internationals from HDM ===
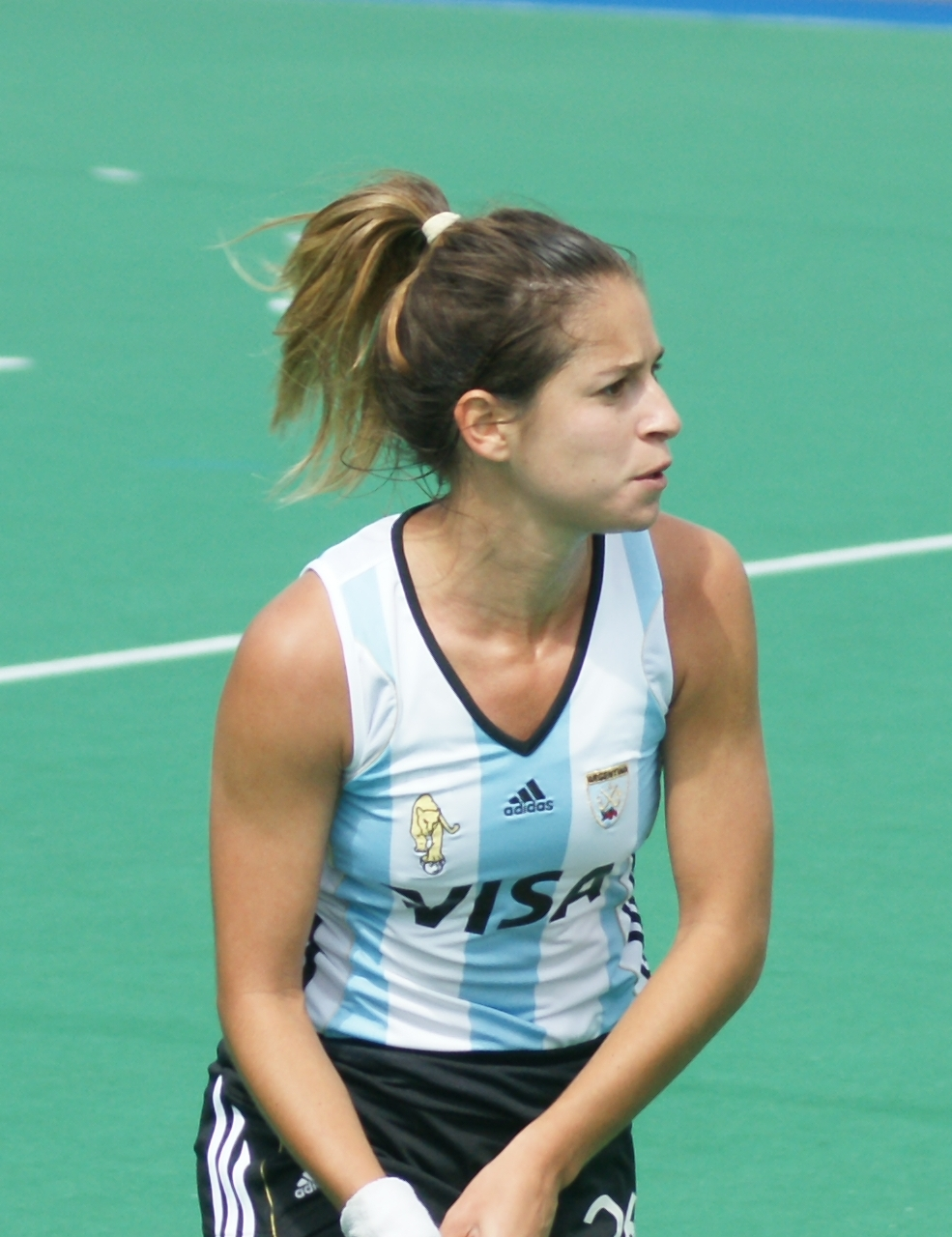
Giselle Kañevsky

- Carina Benninga
- Marc Benninga
- Wendy Fortuin
- Russell Garcia
- Julian Halls
- Nicole Koolen
- Martine Ohr
- Wouter van Pelt
- Koen Pijpers
- Hanneke Smabers
- Minke Smabers
- Macha van der Vaart
- Ingrid Wolff
- Giselle Kañevsky
