= Stichtsche Cricket en Hockey Club =

Dutch sports club, best known for field hockey

SCHC
- Full name: Stichtsche Cricket en Hockey Club
- Nickname(s): Stichtse
- League: Men's Hoofdklasse; Women's Hoofdklasse
- Founded: 22 November 1906; 119 years ago

Personnel
- Members: 2,046
- Website: Club website
Home	Away

Stichtsche Cricket en Hockey Club, commonly known as SCHC, is a Dutch professional sports club based in Bilthoven, Utrecht. The club was founded on 22 November 1906. The club is best known for its field hockey department but it also has a rugby union and a cricket section.

The first men's hockey team played in de the second division until the 2020–21 season called the Promotieklasse after being relegated in the 2018–19 season. While the women's team has played on the highest level since 2004.

== Honours ==
=== Men ===
- National title
  - Winners (1): 1958–59
- Promotieklasse
  - Winners (1): 2025–26
- Hoofdklasse indoor
  - Winners (2): 1999–2000, 2018–19

=== Women ===
- EuroHockey Club Cup
  - Winners (1): 2015
  - Runners-up (1): 2016
- Euro Hockey League
  - Winners (1): 2026
  - Third place (1): 2024
- Gold Cup
  - Winners (2): 2022–23, 2023–24
  - Runners up (1): 2021–22
- Hoofdklasse indoor
  - Winners (2): 2023–24, 2025–26
- EuroHockey Indoor Club Cup
  - Runners-up (1): 2025

== Players ==
=== Current squad ===
As of 13 September 2024

No.	Pos.	Nation	Player
1	GK	NED	Fritz Schnoekcel
2	GK	NED	Sam van der Ven
3	FW	ITA	Mattia Amorosini
4	DF	NED	Olaf van Staa
5	MF	NED	Teun Kropholler
6		NED	Peer Jaspers
7		NED	Steef Stroeken
8		NED	Floris Steenman (Captain)
9	FW	NED	Max Sweering
10	MF	IRE	Conor Empey
11		NED	Jelmer Uildriks

No.	Pos.	Nation	Player
12	DF	NED	Pieter van Gils
13	DF	NED	Casper Hafkamp
14		ESP	Roger Figa
15		NED	Cédric Terwel
16		NED	Maarten Bruisten
18		NED	Lars van Dommelen
19	FW	NED	Sam Figge
20	FW	IRE	Alistair Empey
21	MF	NED	Chip Visscher
22		NED	Mark Boot
23	MF	NED	Sam Martens

=== Notable players ===
==== Men's internationals ====
Netherlands

- Roderik Bouwman
- Jacques Brinkman
- Thierry Brinkman
- Geert-Jan Derikx
- Rob Derikx
- Floris Evers
- Erik Jazet
- Roderick Weusthof
- Jeroen Zweerts
- Koen van Doorn
- Philippe Bouvy
- Marc-Jan Dikzaksen

Argentina

- Lucas Cammareri
- Matias Cammareri
- Pedro Ibarra

Ireland

- Conor Empey
- Michael Darling
- Conor Harte
- David Harte
- Michael Watt

Spain

- Albert Sala

==== Women's internationals ====
Netherlands

- Pien Dicke
- Roos Drost
- Carlien Dirkse van den Heuvel
- Ellen Hoog
- Yibbi Jansen
- Laurien Leurink
- Yibbi Jansen
- Jip Dicke
- Lisa Post
- Caia van Maasakker
- Sophie Polkamp
- Inge Vermeulen
- Frederique Derkx
- Xan de Waard
- Carlijn Welten
- Ginella Zerbo
- Renée van Laarhoven
- Marleen Jochems

Argentina

- Soledad Garcia
- Mariana González Oliva
- Delfina Merino

England/Great Britain

- Beth Storry
- Maddie Hinch
- Anna Toman

Brazil

- Inge Vermeulen
