= Bilthoven =

- Village
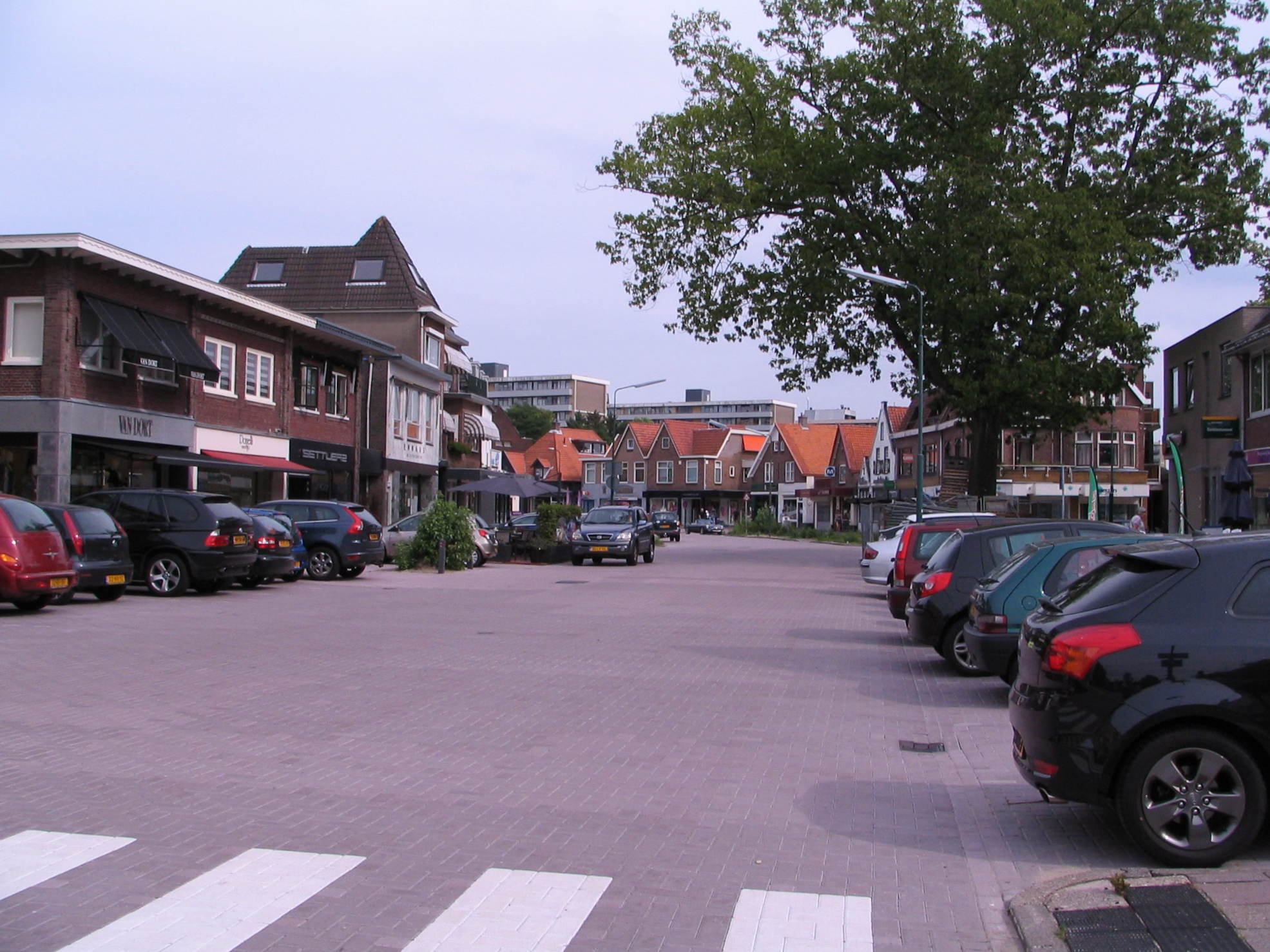
- Street view in Bilthoven

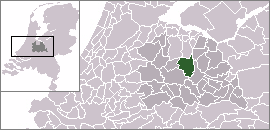

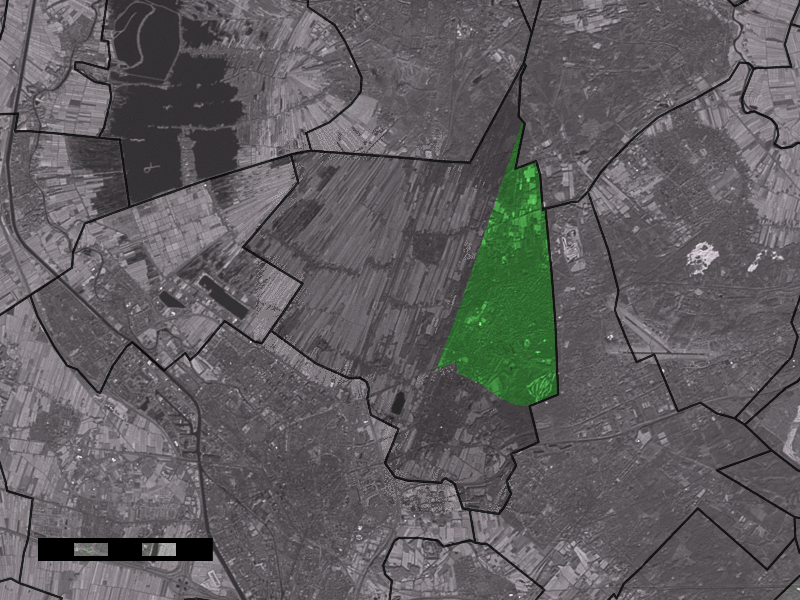
- Bilthoven in the municipality of De Bilt
- Coordinates: 52°7′42″N 5°11′55″E
- Country: Netherlands
- Province: Utrecht
- Municipality: De Bilt

Population (31 December 2024)
  - Total: 23,248
- Postal code: 3720-3723
- Area code: 030

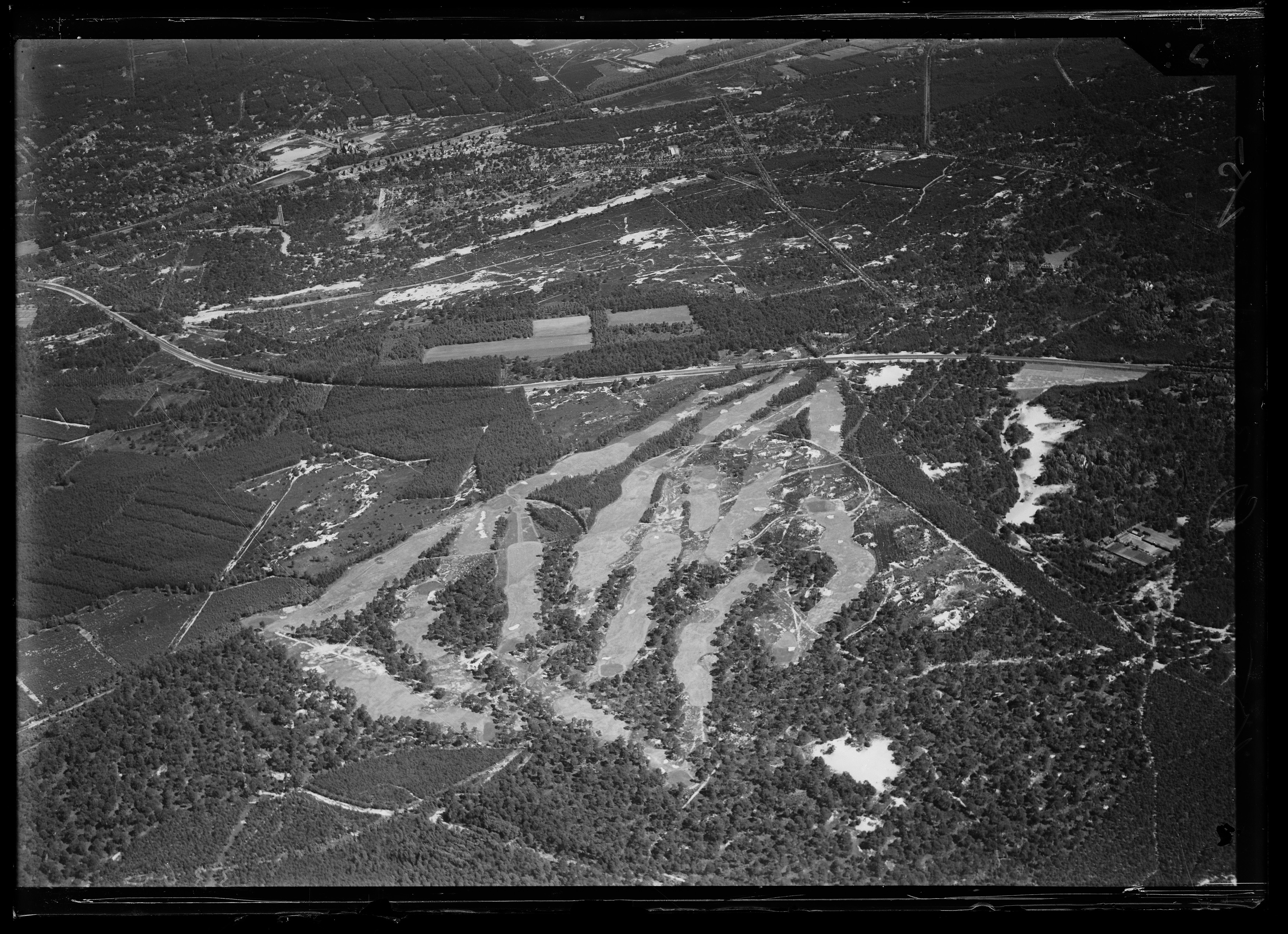
Aerial photograph of Bilthoven by a forerunner of the Dutch Royal Air Force, 1920–1940.

Bilthoven is a village in the Dutch province of Utrecht. It is a part of the municipality of De Bilt. It has a railway station with connections to Utrecht, Amersfoort and Baarn. It is home to the Netherlands National Institute for Public Health and the Environment, RIVM; and to the Union Mundial pro Interlingua, UMI, which promotes Interlingua internationally.

The statistical area "Bilthoven", which also can include the surrounding countryside, has a population of around 23,248.

== History ==
The history of the town goes back to 20 August 1843, the day when the Utrecht-Amersfoort railway track began operating. A station was placed at the junction of the track line with the Soestdijkseweg. Initially, the Dutch railways did not plan a station on this spot.

Around 1900, the first villas appeared round the new station. The train traffic to and from the new station increased strongly at the same time: in 1902, one could take the train in both directions 52 times per day. As a result of this rail connection with the city, and the fact that the land nearby was relatively cheap, the number of villas continued to increase rapidly.

At this time the name of the town was still Bilt-station, but since it was not just a station anymore, the name was changed during a Council meeting on the 23 May 1917. Several names were presented, among which Bilt-Buiten, the Biltwijk and the Leyen. Eventually the name Biltsche Duinen was chosen. However, this name was not accepted by the Dutch railway company. For this reason, on 11 October 1917 another Council meeting was dedicated to the naming of the village. At this Council meeting several names were discussed, such as Leyenhoven, Bilt-Hoog and the Bilthof. The majority of the Council eventually agreed to the name of Bilthoven (which is the plural of Bilthof), which was suggested by Council member Melchior.

== Significant events ==
Three international peace groups were founded in Bilthoven in the aftermath of World War I as part of the Bilthoven Meetings: the International Fellowship of Reconciliation in 1919, Service Civil International in 1920, and War Resisters' International in 1921. The founding meetings of all three groups took place at the home of Kees and Betty Boeke.

The experimental school De Werkplaats Kindergemeenschap, founded by Kees Boeke, has been based in Bilthoven since 1926. The former Dutch Queen Beatrix went to this school.

== Transport ==
- Bilthoven railway station
