= Amsterdamse Bos =

Urban forest and landscape park near Amsterdam, Netherlands

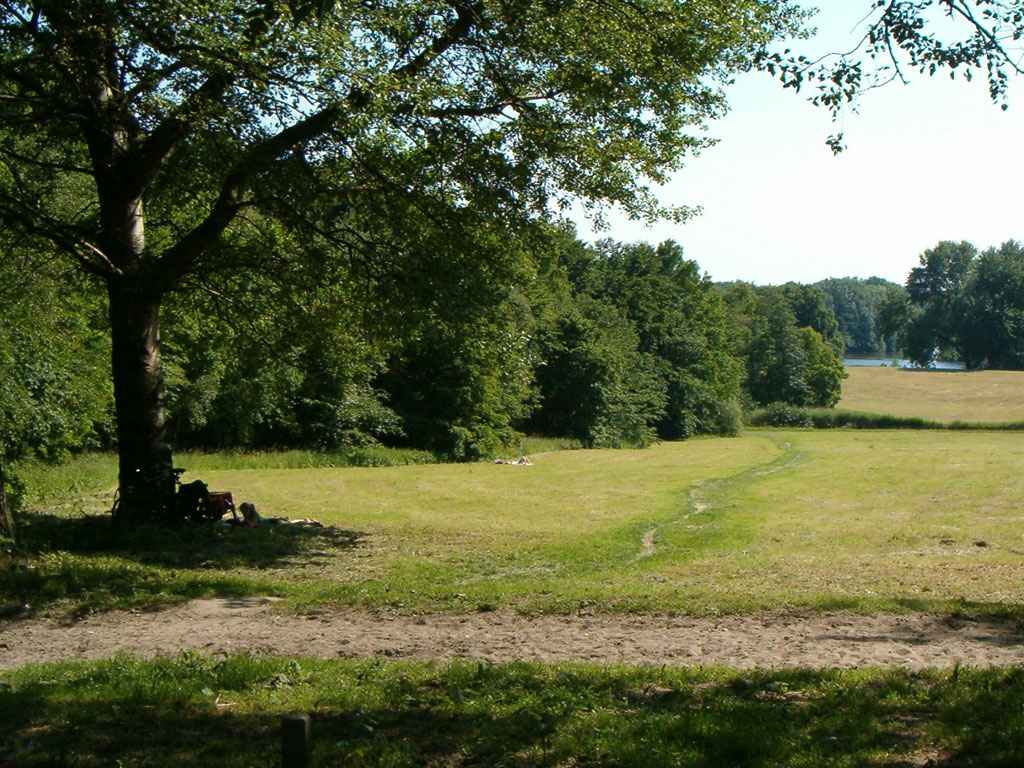
- View over a pond from the Heuvel
- Interactive map of Amsterdamse Bos
- Type: Urban forest and landscape park
- Location: Amstelveen, Amsterdam and Aalsmeer, Netherlands
- Coordinates: 52°18′39″N 4°49′57″E
- Area: 1,000 ha (2,500 acres)
- Created: 1934–1970
- Designer: Cornelis van Eesteren and Jakoba Mulder
- Operator: City of Amsterdam
- Visitors: c. 6 million visits annually
- Open: All year

The Amsterdamse Bos (Dutch for "Amsterdam Forest") is a large urban forest and landscape park south-west of Amsterdam, Netherlands. It lies predominantly in the municipality of Amstelveen, with smaller parts in Amsterdam and, through the later Schinkelbos extension, Aalsmeer. The forest is owned and managed by the City of Amsterdam. The managing authority gives its area as approximately 1,000 ha (2,500 acres) and estimates that it receives around six million visits each year.

Originally developed as the Boschplan ("Forest Plan"), the Amsterdamse Bos was designed by urban planners Cornelis van Eesteren and Jakoba Mulder as a large public landscape combining nature, recreation and sport. Construction began in 1934 and was closely connected with unemployment-relief programmes during the Great Depression. The design combines the naturalistic tradition of the English landscape garden with ideas from German Volksparks, in which active recreation was an integral part of public green space.

Among its best-known features are the Bosbaan rowing course, the international field-hockey facilities around the Wagener Stadium, the Cherry Blossom Park, large areas of woodland and wetland, and a distinctive collection of bridges designed by Piet Kramer in the style of the Amsterdam School.

== Location and administration ==
The core of the Amsterdamse Bos occupies the north-western part of Amstelveen. The municipal boundary with Amsterdam runs approximately parallel to the Bosbaan along the northern edge of the main forest. The northern part of the forest adjoins Buitenveldert, a post-war residential district of Amsterdam developed as part of the city’s General Extension Plan. The Ringvaart forms the western boundary, while the Bosrandweg marks the boundary with Aalsmeer to the south-west.

The Schinkelbos, south of the Bosrandweg in Aalsmeer, was added to the forest in 1999. It was developed primarily as an ecological corridor and consists of a mosaic of woodland, grassland, reed beds and open water.

The A9 motorway crosses the southern half of the Amsterdamse Bos.

== History ==
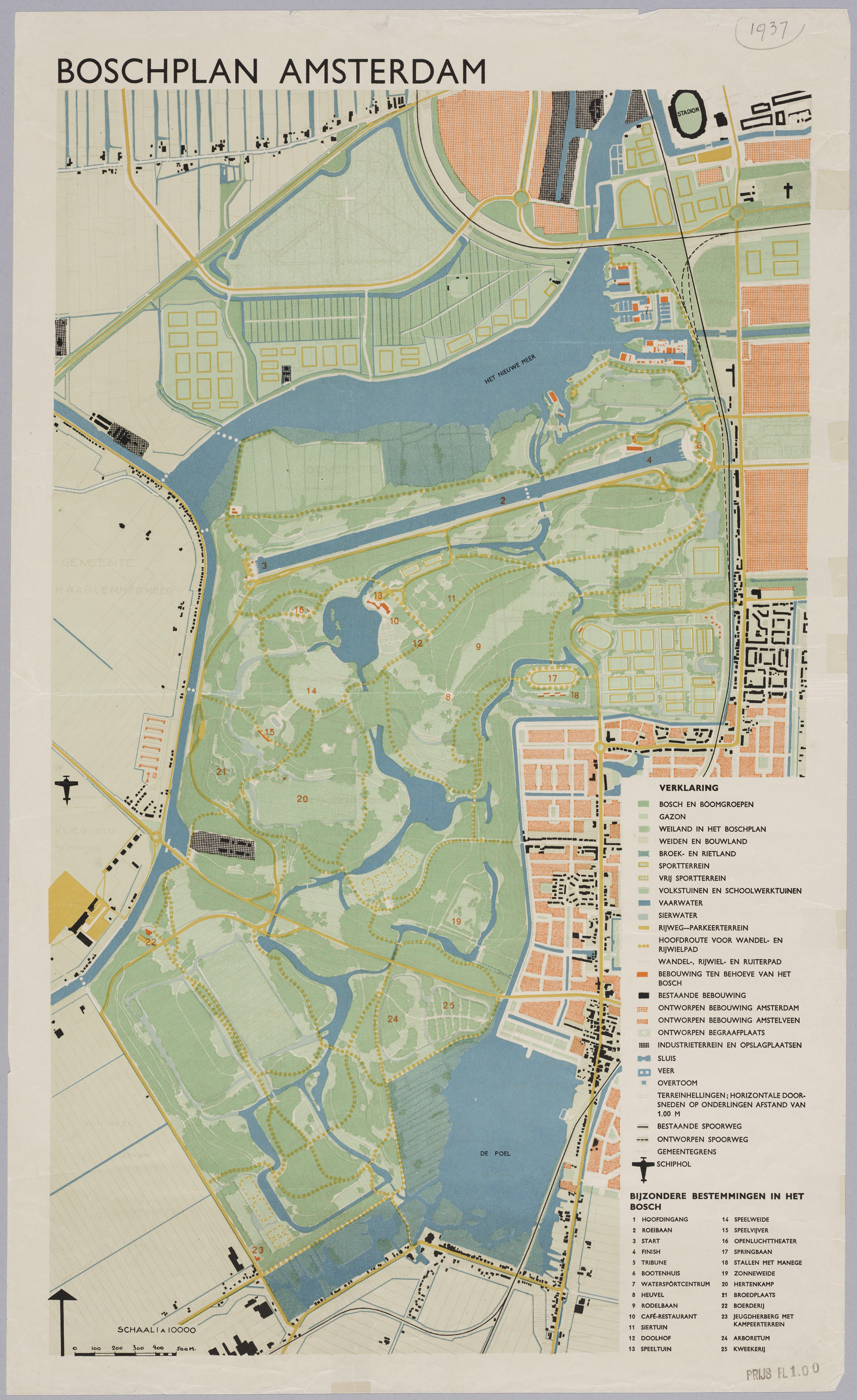
Map of the Boschplan Amsterdam, 1937

=== Origins and planning ===
The idea of creating a large green area south of Amsterdam can be traced to around 1900. Dutch naturalist and conservationist Jac. P. Thijsse argued that the expanding city needed accessible countryside and identified the area south of the Nieuwe Meer as suitable for a large forest and recreation area.

The Amsterdam city council decided in 1928 to create a major public park. Van Eesteren and Mulder developed the Boschplan within Amsterdam's municipal Public Works Department. Their scheme became part of the city's General Extension Plan of 1935, which integrated housing, infrastructure and large areas of open space into a comprehensive plan for Amsterdam's expansion.

Before construction, much of the area consisted of low-lying polders and former peat meadows. Peat had been extracted from parts of the landscape before the land was drained. Remnants of the older peat landscape survive around the Nieuwe Meer, Polder Meerzicht and the Amstelveense Poel.

=== Construction and unemployment relief ===
Construction began on 30 April 1934, with excavation of the Bosbaan among the first major works. With unemployment in Amsterdam exceptionally high during the economic depression, the project was organised as a large-scale employment-relief scheme. The work was supervised by the Nederlandsche Heidemaatschappij. Between 1934 and 1940 alone, approximately 20,000 unemployed men worked on the project, much of the earthmoving being carried out manually with shovels and wheelbarrows.

The work was not intended simply to plant a forest. Hills, ponds, drainage channels, meadows, playing fields, roads and paths were constructed as components of a deliberately designed landscape.

=== Second World War ===
Construction continued at a reduced pace during the German occupation of the Netherlands. The occupation authorities established labour camps in and around the forest. Four camps in the Amsterdamse Bos were specifically used for Jewish men, who were subjected to forced labour. These camps formed part of the persecution of Dutch Jews and, for many of those imprisoned there, preceded deportation to concentration and extermination camps.

Other prisoners were also put to work in the area. Because of the proximity of Schiphol, German anti-aircraft positions and searchlights were installed, and strips of young woodland were cleared. Further trees were cut for fuel during the Dutch famine of 1944–1945.

=== Completion and later development ===
After the war, work continued under the Dutch public-works employment programme known as the Dienst Uitvoering Werken (DUW), before mechanised contractors increasingly took over. In 1947 the Amsterdam city council officially changed the name from Boschplan to Amsterdamse Bos. The final trees of the original development were planted by schoolchildren on the southern slope of the Heuvel on 25 March 1970.

The Schinkelbos was added on the south-western side from 1999, extending the ecological role of the forest towards Aalsmeer.

== Design and landscape ==
The Amsterdamse Bos was conceived as a use forest rather than as either a conventional urban park or a production forest. Van Eesteren and Mulder sought to combine a naturalistic landscape with places for organised sport and informal recreation.

The influence of the English landscape tradition is visible in its rolling meadows, irregular groups of trees, curving woodland edges and winding waterways. Vistas, changes in elevation and deliberately placed "vanishing points" were used to create a sense of greater depth and scale. German Volkspark principles influenced the concentration of sports fields, play areas and other active uses, allowing other areas to retain a quieter landscape character.

A dense system of walking, cycling and bridle paths was laid out alongside an extensive network of ponds, canals and drainage channels. Their intersections required a large number of bridges. The forest now contains 116 bridges, of which the managing authority attributes 67 to Amsterdam School architect Piet Kramer.

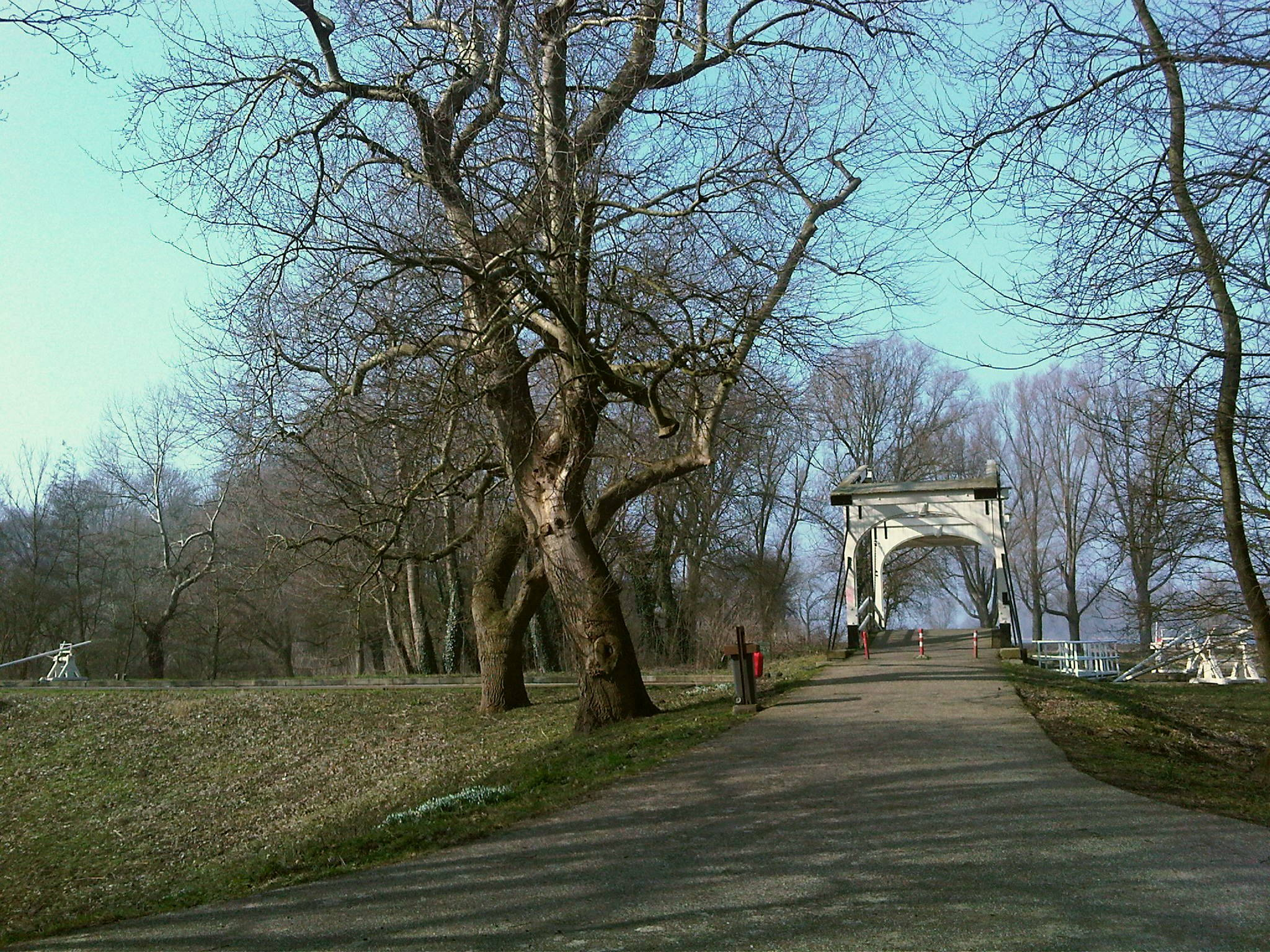
Bridge over the canal between the Bosbaan and the Nieuwe Meer

Kramer treated the bridges as individual pieces of architecture rather than standard infrastructure. He varied materials, construction, colour and form in response to their locations. Particularly distinctive are several small movable "ball bridges", whose brightly coloured spherical counterweights form part of the mechanism. Many of Kramer's bridges have since been restored, including reconstruction of their original colour schemes where these could be established.

== Nature and water management ==
The Amsterdamse Bos contains planted woodland, grassland, reed beds, wetlands, ponds and remnants of the pre-existing peat landscape. The managing authority records approximately 200,000 trees and 19 ha (47 acres) of marsh and swamp woodland.

Nature areas include the southern shores of the Nieuwe Meer, Polder Meerzicht, the Amstelveense Poel, Vogeleiland and the Schinkelbos. Highland cattle and Exmoor ponies are used for conservation grazing in some parts of the forest. Wetland vegetation includes species such as early marsh-orchid, lesser butterfly-orchid and round-leaved sundew. The area is also an important habitat for the grass snake.

Because the forest was constructed in drained polders, water management is fundamental to its landscape. The main internal water level is approximately 5.5 m (18 ft) below NAP, although several areas have separate water regimes. Connected ponds and waterways drain towards a pumping station, from which excess water is discharged into the Ringvaart. Water levels are managed by the Rijnland District Water Control Board.

The Amsterdamse Bos is an important link in the Groene AS ("Green Axis"), an ecological corridor connecting green areas between Amstelland, the Westeinderplassen and Spaarnwoude. Wildlife-friendly banks, ponds and fauna passages have been constructed to reduce fragmentation between habitats.

=== Cherry Blossom Park ===
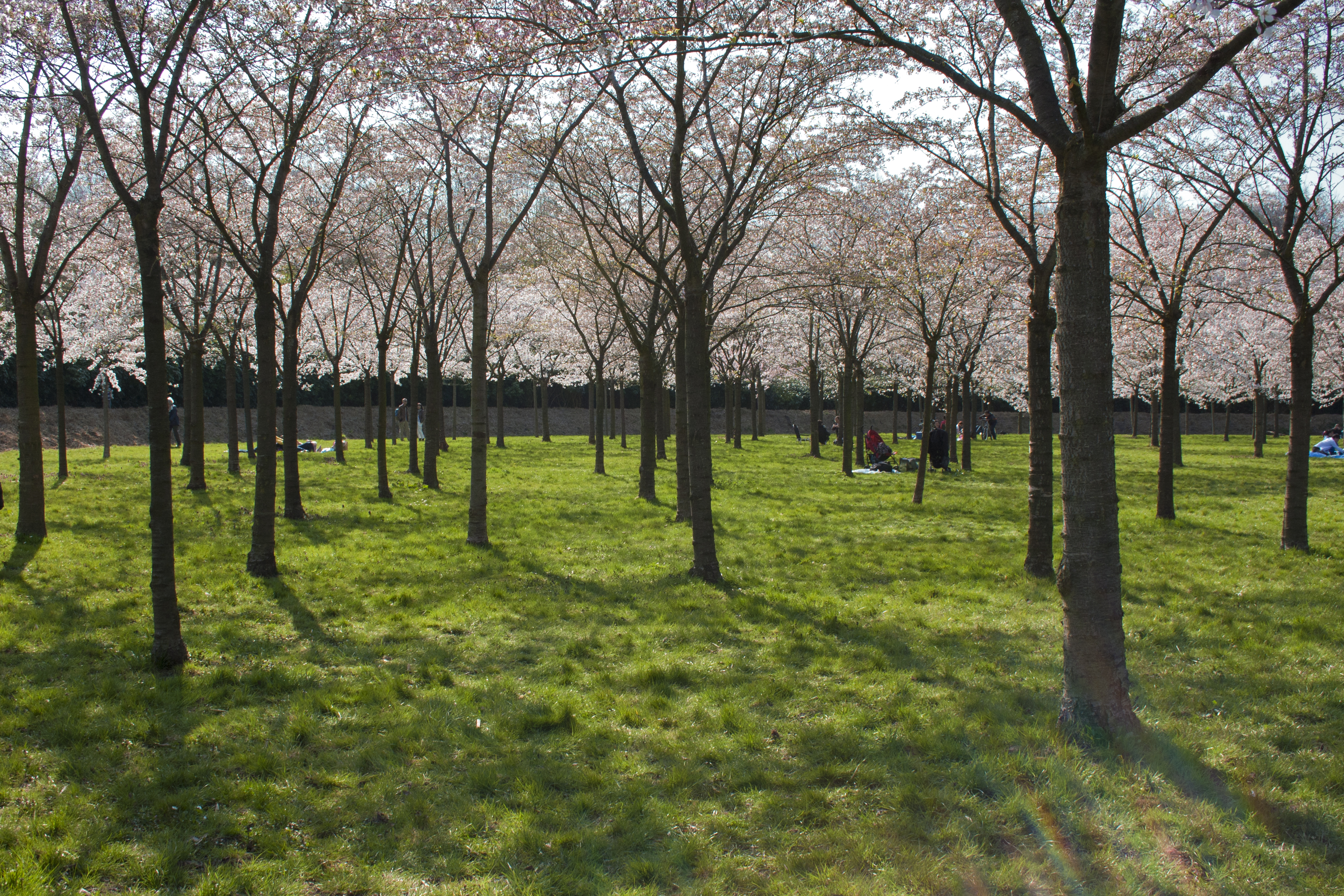
Cherry Blossom Park

The Cherry Blossom Park (Dutch: Bloesempark) lies beside the Amstelveense Poel in the southern part of the forest. In 2000, the Japan Women's Club donated 400 Japanese cherry trees to Amstelveen. The park became particularly associated with the Japanese community in the Amsterdam region and with the Japanese custom of hanami, or viewing cherry blossom.

A black-granite memorial unveiled in 2012 commemorates those affected by the 2011 Tōhoku earthquake and tsunami. The original cherry trees are being replaced as part of a renewal project running from 2025 to 2029.

== Heritage and memorials ==
The landscape design, bridges and surviving structures of the Amsterdamse Bos form an important collection of twentieth-century public works and landscape architecture.

The boathouse and standing terrace at the Bosbaan was built around 1936 to a design by P. van Niftrik of Amsterdam's Public Works Department. It is protected as a Dutch national monument because of its architectural and cultural-historical importance and its relationship to the employment-relief construction of the forest.

Five principal memorials are identified by the forest administration.

- The National Dachau Monument, designed by artist Niek Kemps, commemorates the victims of Dachau concentration camp.
- De Kruiwagen ("The Wheelbarrow") commemorates the labourers who built the forest during the Depression-era employment programmes.
- The Tsunami Memorial in the Cherry Blossom Park commemorates the victims of the 2011 Japanese earthquake and tsunami.
- The Stedenmaagd ("City Maiden") is the restored original 1883 allegorical statue formerly displayed at the entrance to Amsterdam's Vondelpark. It was placed at the Koenenkade entrance to the Amsterdamse Bos in 2014.
- A granite memorial stone near the Sportpark commemorates victims of the Second World War.

== Sports ==
Sport was incorporated into the Amsterdamse Bos from the beginning rather than being added to the landscape later. The Sportpark and surrounding facilities accommodate field hockey, cricket, tennis, football and other sports; clubs based in the forest collectively have approximately 8,500 members.

The eastern Sportpark contains the Wagener Stadium and grounds used by several major Dutch field-hockey clubs, as well as cricket and tennis facilities. Wagener Stadium has hosted major international hockey events, including matches at the 2026 men's and women's FIH Hockey World Cups.

Recreational facilities elsewhere in the forest include walking and cycling routes, canoeing, horse riding, playgrounds and children's paddling pools. The Grote Vijver and Grote Speelweide form a major open recreation area. The Zonneweide is reserved for naturist recreation.

The forest also contains the Amsterdamse Bostheater, an open-air theatre used for theatre and concerts, Geitenboerderij Ridammerhoeve, Boerderij Meerzicht and the visitor centre De Boswinkel.

=== Bosbaan ===
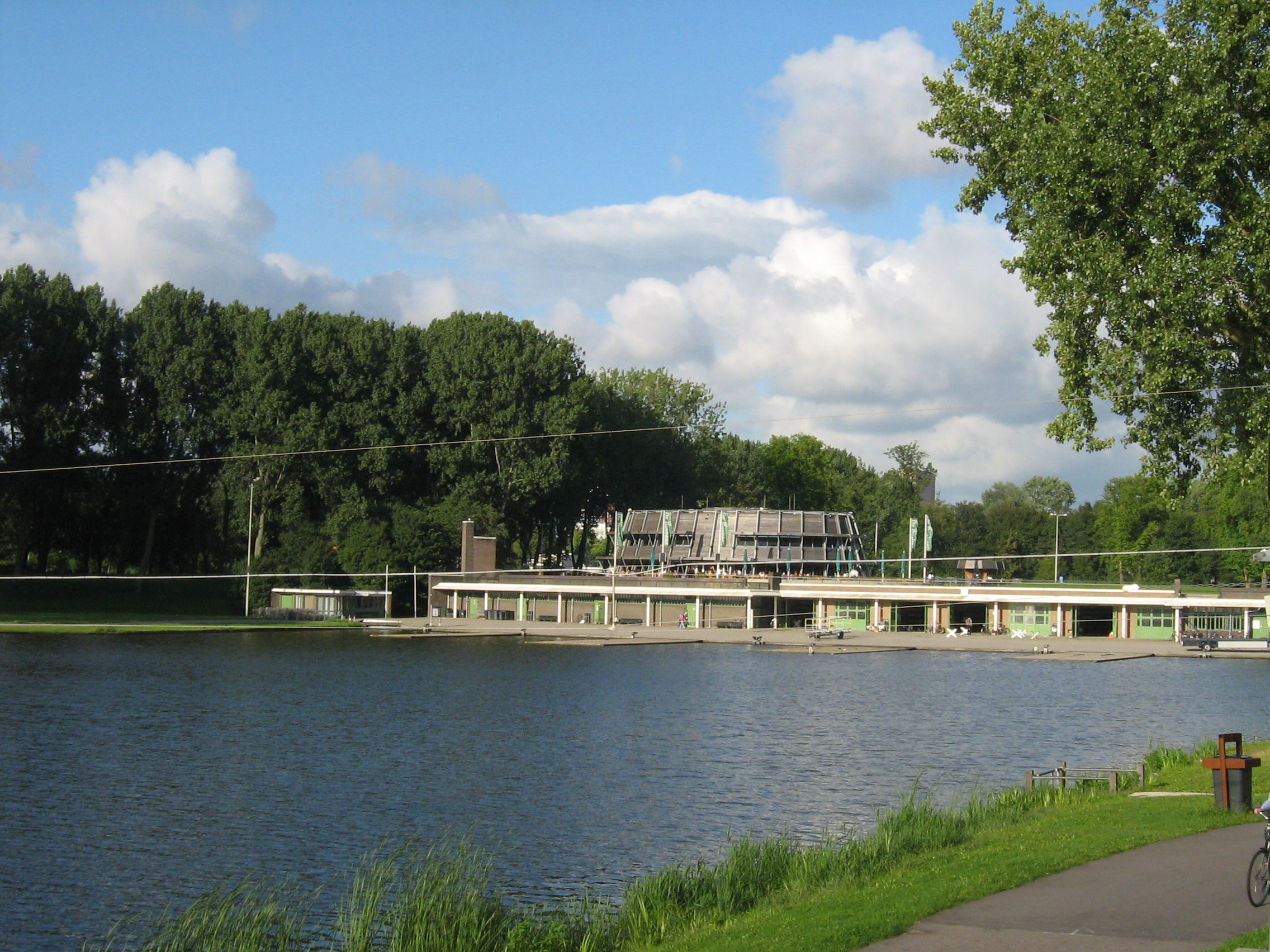
The historic boathouse at the Bosbaan

The Bosbaan is an artificial rowing course excavated as one of the first major components of the Boschplan. The first rowing competition was held there in May 1937. The original course was 2,200 m (7,200 ft) long and 72 m (236 ft) wide. It was widened to 92 m (302 ft) in 1963 and to 118 m (387 ft) in 2001, providing eight competition lanes.

The Bosbaan is one of the world's oldest purpose-built artificial rowing courses. It hosted the World Rowing Championships in 1977 and 2014 and is scheduled to host the championships for a third time from 24 to 30 August 2026.

== Cultural and political events ==
The Amsterdamse Bos has also been used for large political gatherings and concerts.

On 26 June 1971, a large free concert was held in the forest, with Pink Floyd among the performers.

On 29 and 30 April 1972, the organisation Jongeren voor Vietnam ("Youth for Vietnam") held a large anti-Vietnam War gathering on a field along the northern edge of the forest. The site subsequently became known as the Vietnamweide ("Vietnam Meadow").

The forest continued to host large concerts and festivals in later decades, although the balance between major events, recreation and protection of the landscape has periodically been debated.

== Access ==
The principal northern entrance is on the Amstelveenseweg. The Amsterdamse Bos is extensively connected to Amsterdam and Amstelveen by cycling and walking routes.

The Sportas is a continuous cycling and walking corridor running from the Havenstraatterrein in Amsterdam, past the Olympic Stadium, through the eastern part of the Amsterdamse Bos and onwards towards central Amstelveen. Within the forest it passes the Bosbaan entrance, De Boswinkel and the sporting facilities along the Nieuwe Kalfjeslaan.

A seasonal heritage tram runs from Amsterdam's Haarlemmermeerstation along the eastern edge of the forest, with several stops serving the Amsterdamse Bos. Seasonal passenger ferries across the Nieuwe Meer also provide access for pedestrians and cyclists from western Amsterdam.

== Management ==
In 2021, the municipal executives of Amsterdam and Amstelveen jointly adopted the Amsterdamse Bos Plan 2020–2030, the first integrated policy plan for the forest prepared jointly by the two municipalities. Its priorities include protection and enhancement of natural values, maintenance and climate resilience, improved access by bicycle and public transport, environmental education, sport and recreation, and management of increasing visitor pressure.

== See also ==
- Bosbaan
- Jakoba Mulder
- Cornelis van Eesteren
- General Extension Plan of Amsterdam
