= Piet Kramer =

Dutch architect (1881–1961)

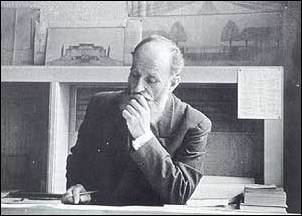
Piet Kramer

Pieter Lodewijk (Piet) Kramer (Amsterdam, 1 July 1881 – Santpoort, 4 February 1961) was a Dutch architect, one of the most important architects of the Amsterdam School (Expressionist architecture).

From 1903 to 1911 Piet Kramer worked in the architectural practice of Eduard Cuypers, where he came into contact with the architects Johan van der Mey and Michel de Klerk. In 1911 van der Mey received the commission to design the Scheepvaarthuis (Shipping House), a cooperative building for six Dutch shipping companies. Van der Mey sought the assistance of his former colleague-architects Piet Kramer and Michel de Klerk to realize this building. The Scheepvaarthuis (1913–1916) is considered the starting point of the Amsterdam School movement. Later Piet Kramer collaborated with Michel de Klerk on the well-known De Dageraad housing project in Amsterdam South (1919–1923). Outside Amsterdam he built one of his masterpieces, the De Bijenkorf Store in The Hague (1924–1926). After the death of Michel de Klerk in 1923, Piet Kramer was the leading architect of the Amsterdam School until the end of this movement in the beginning of the 1930s.

In the years of economic crisis of the 1930s the expensive architecture of the Amsterdam School was passé. A new architecture and town planning was in process of development in Amsterdam, represented by CIAM-Rationalists like Cornelis van Eesteren and Ben Merkelbach. In the new architecture the principle of spatial corridors between functionalistic blocks was relevant. On the contrary, the Amsterdam School town planning was based on a town structure with streets and places.

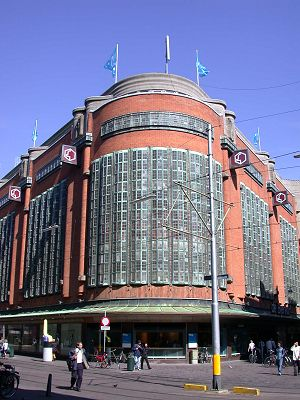
De Bijenkorf Store The Hague (1924–1926)

In the second half of his professional life, the main job of Piet Kramer was architect for canal bridges in the municipal public works department in Amsterdam (Gemeentelijke Dienst Publieke Werken). He made the drawings for more than 500 bridges. The total number of realized Piet Kramer bridges is 220, 64 of them in the Amsterdamse Bos park. Besides the bridges he often designed the additional bridge houses, ironwork and landscaping. The sculptural work was generally done by Hildo Krop.

After the death of Piet Kramer in 1961, on the high point of the Rationalist movement, no architectural institution or museum was interested in his Expressionist work. For that reason all his drawings and models were burnt.

== Amsterdam South ==
De Dageraad (The Dawn), part of Plan Zuid (Plan South) by Berlage. Working-class Socialist housing by Piet Kramer and Michel de Klerk (1920–1923). The architectural contribution by Piet Kramer is shown in this article. See also Michel de Klerk.

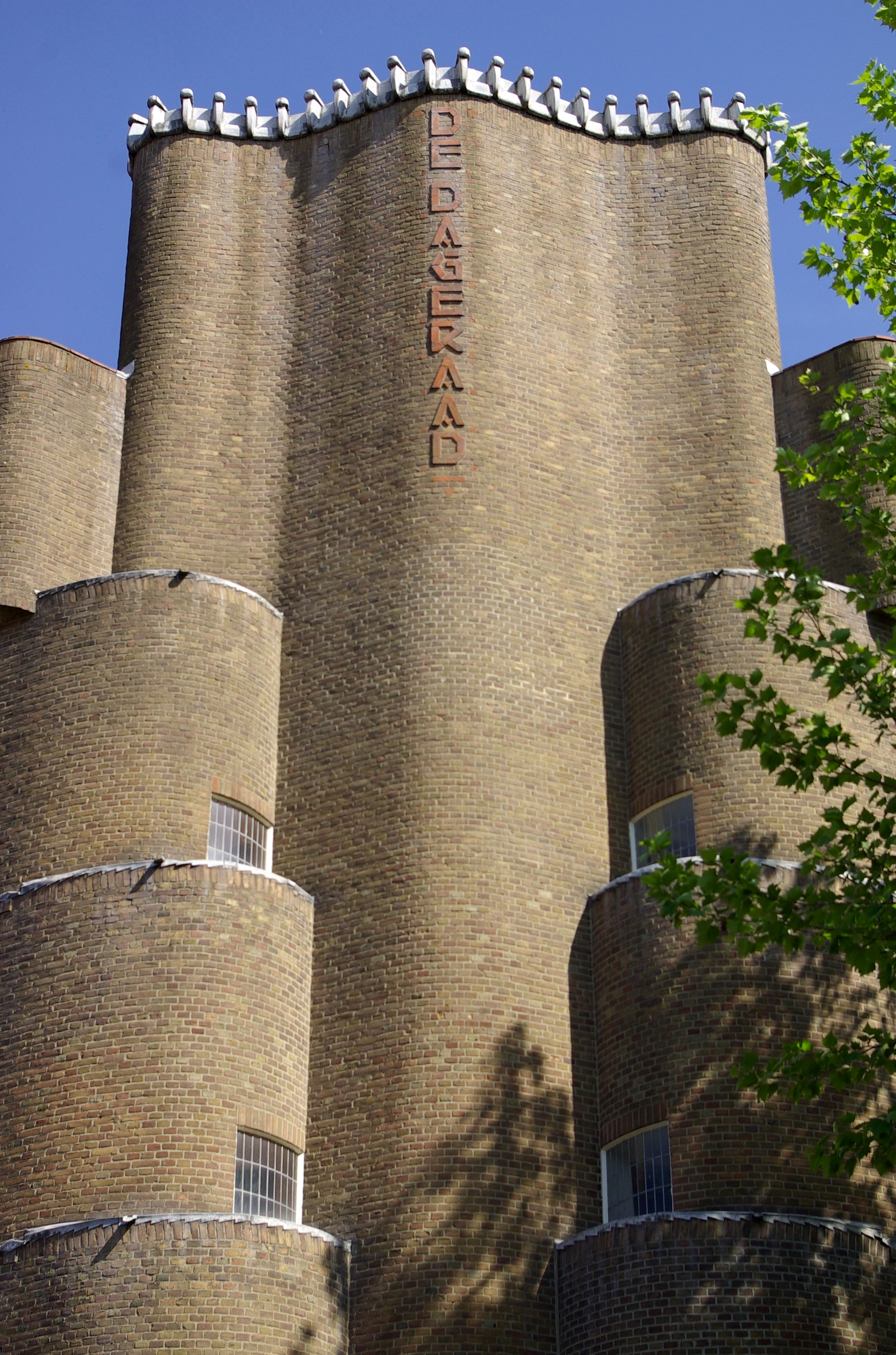
Burgemeester Tellegen- straat / P.L.Takstraat (r)

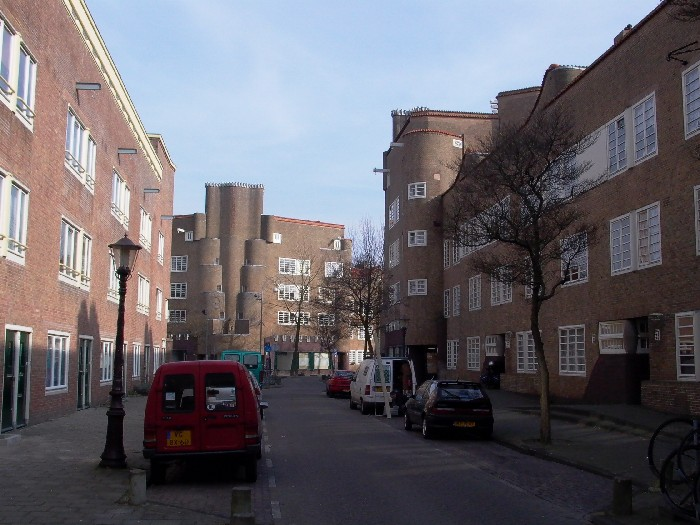
Burg. Tellegenstraat Kramer (m), de Klerk (r)

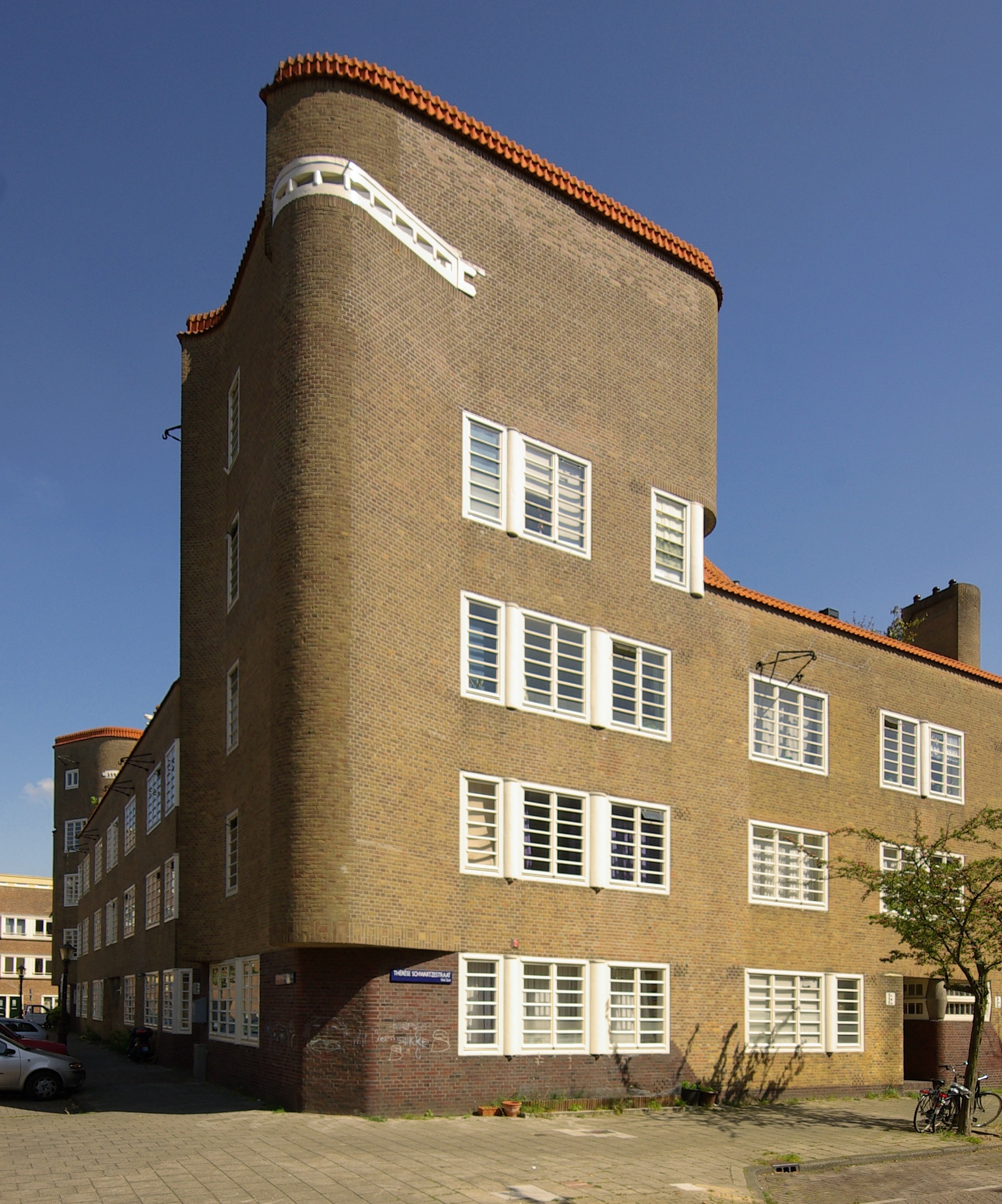
Thérèse Schwartzestraat / Willem Passtoorsstraat (l)

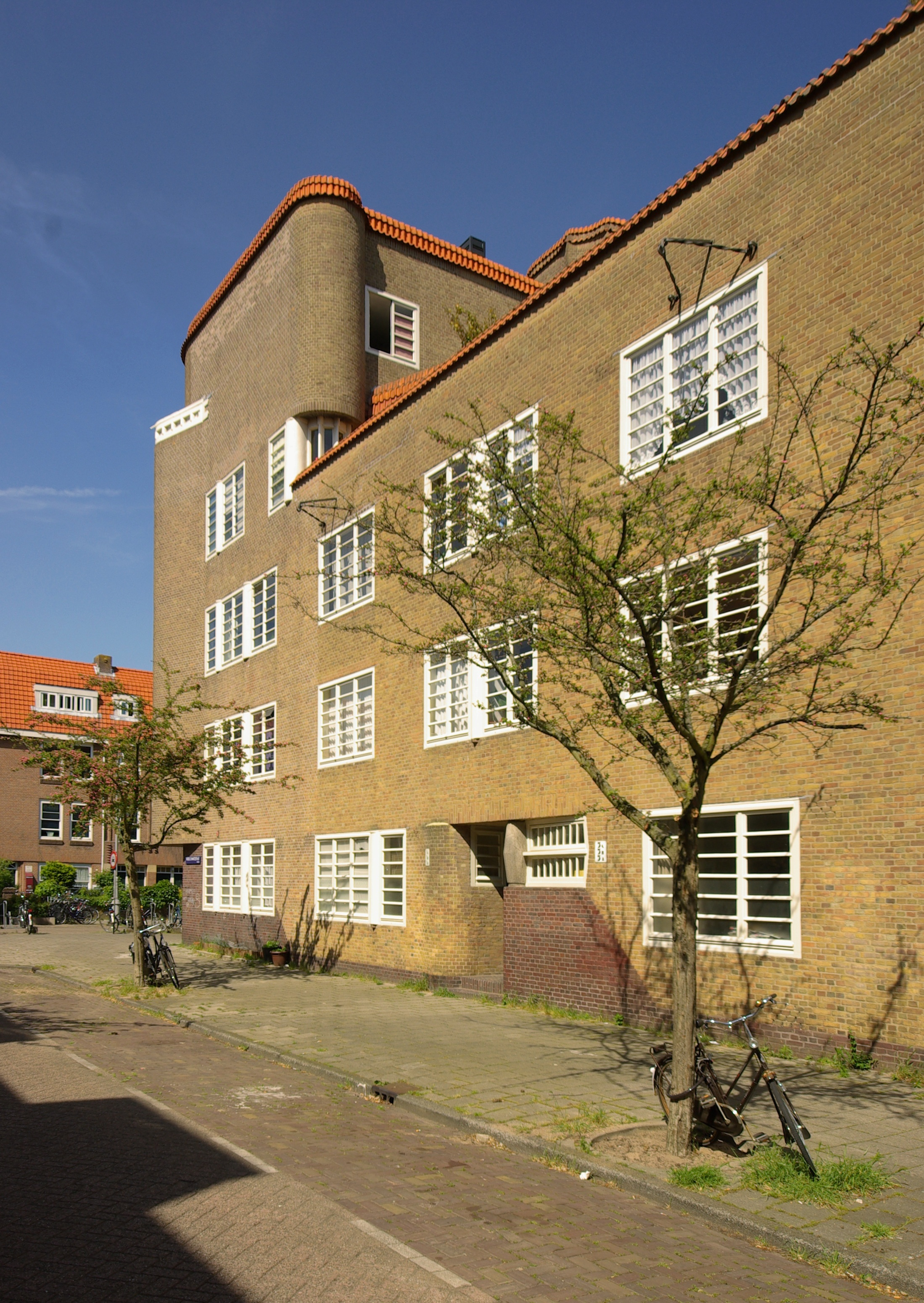
Thérèse Schwartzestraat

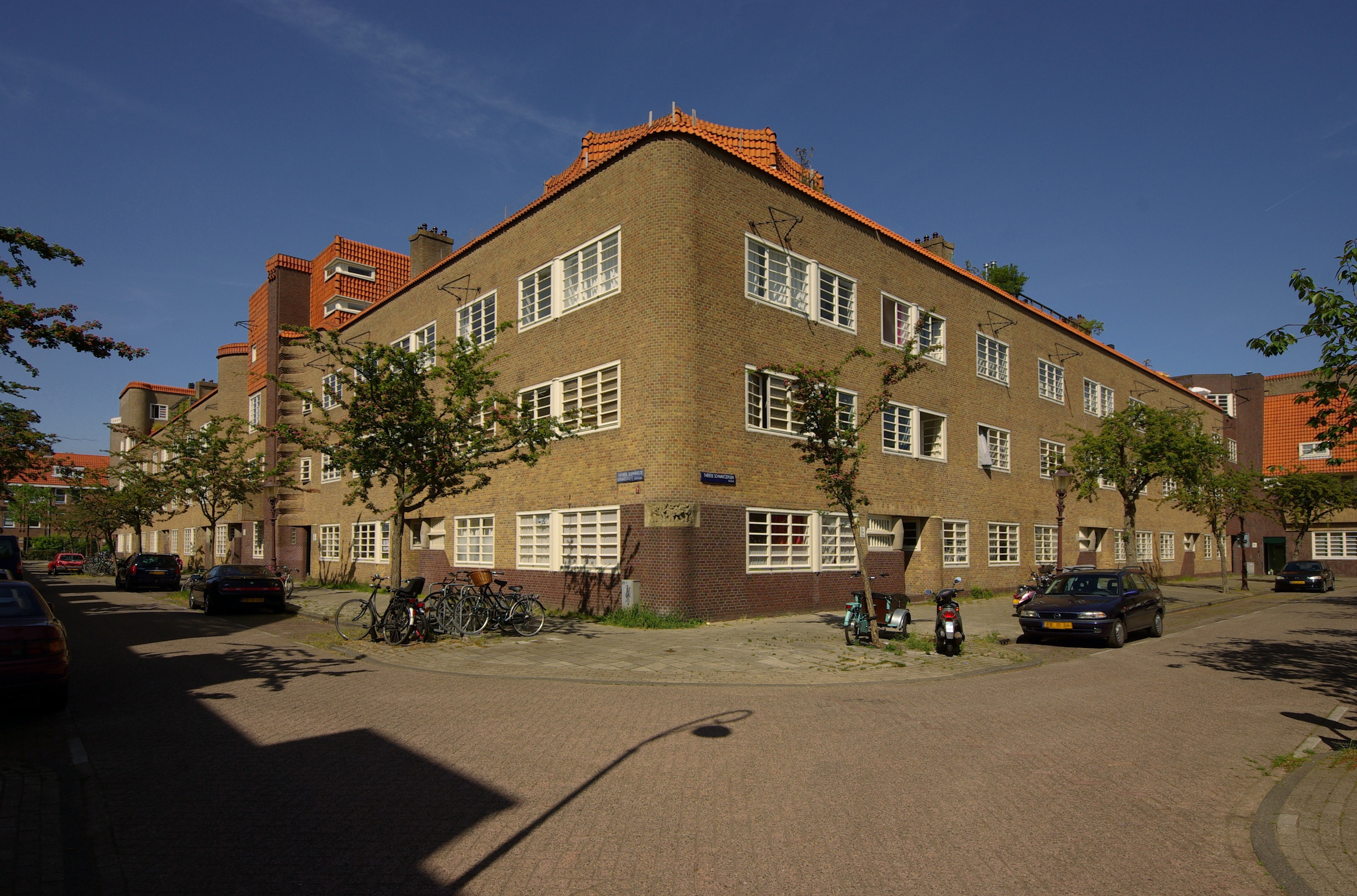
Thérèse Schwartzestraat / Thérèse Schwartzeplein

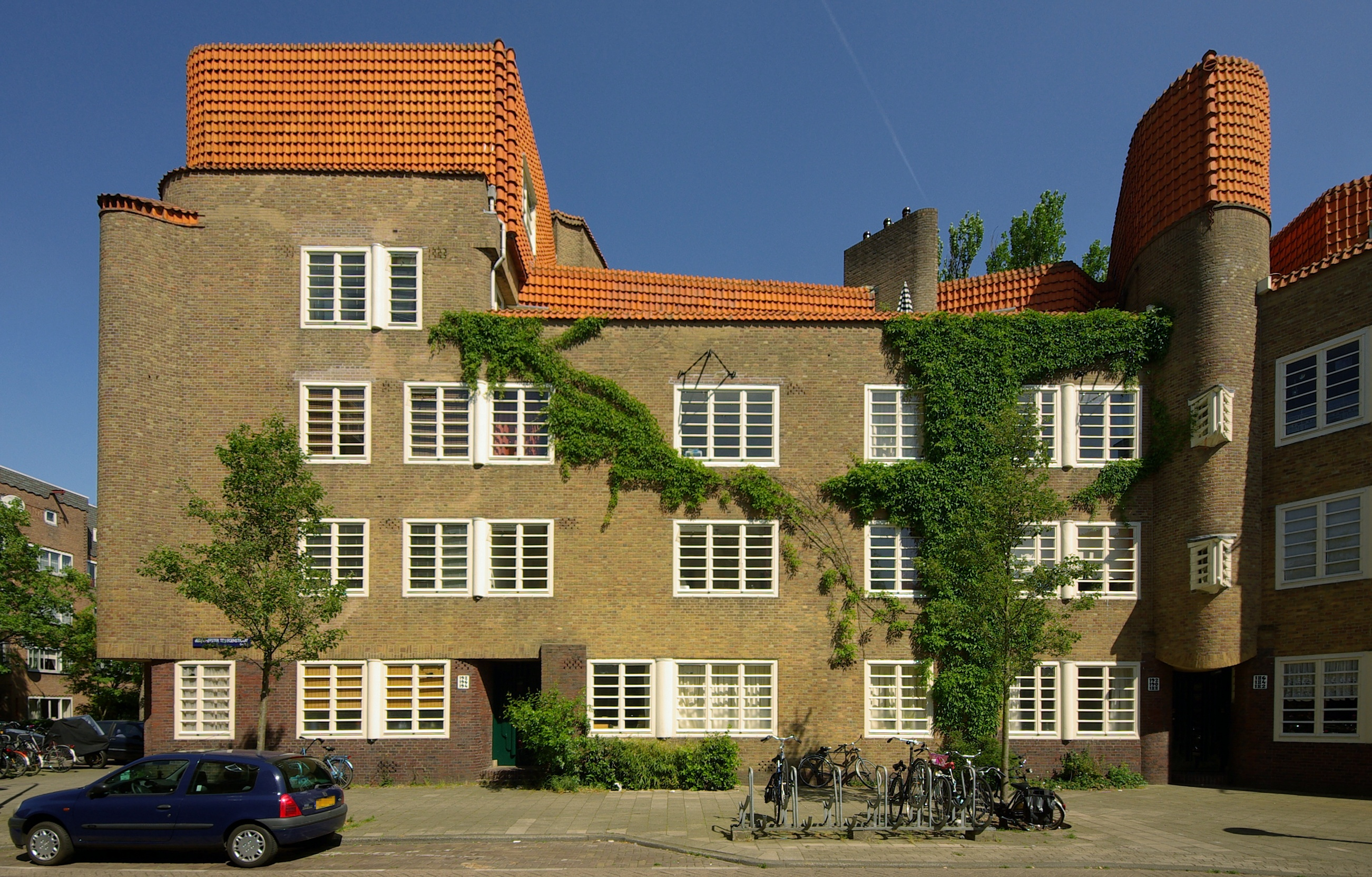
Burgemeester Tellegen- straat / Talmastraat (l)

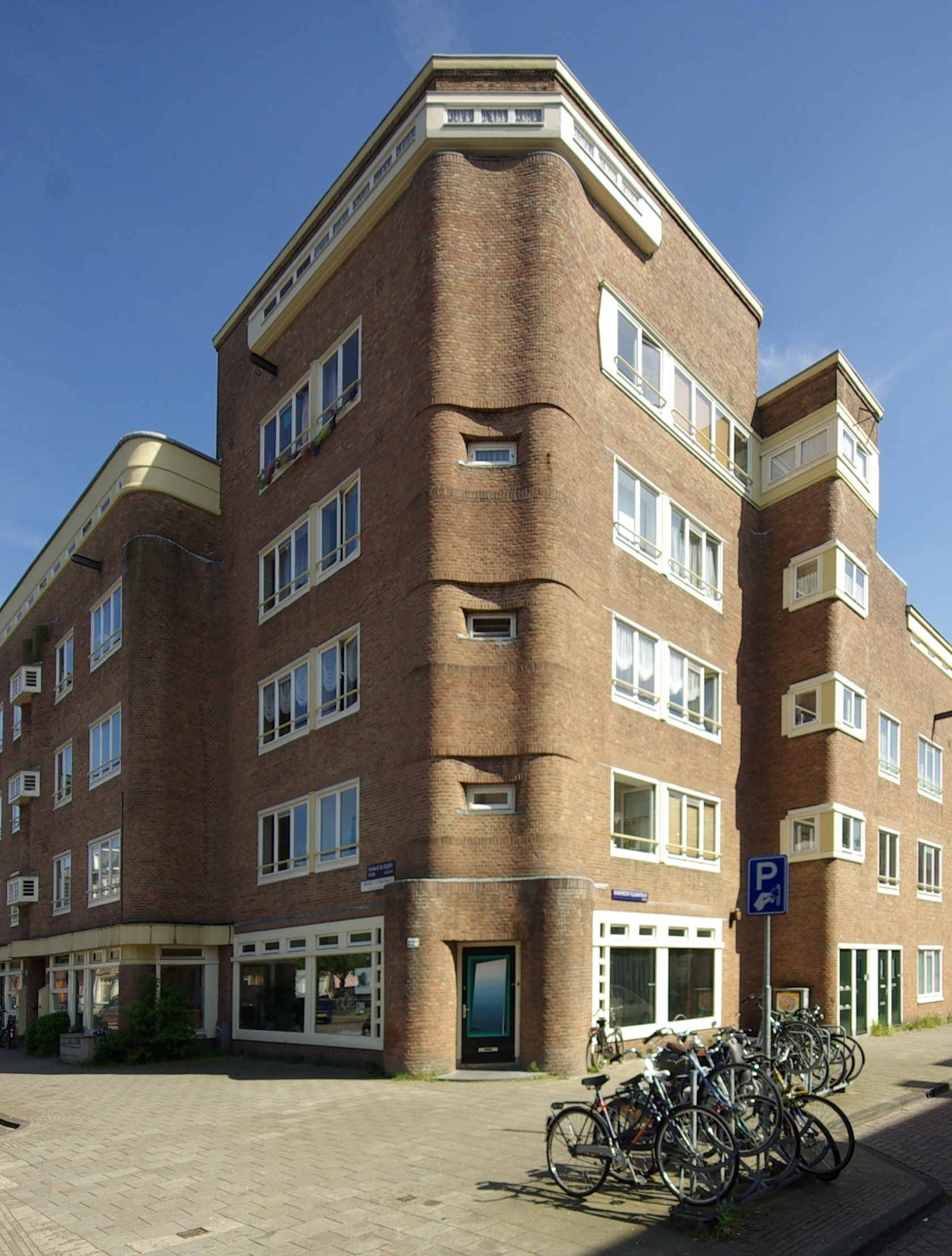
Burgemeester Tellegen- straat / Lutmastraat (l)

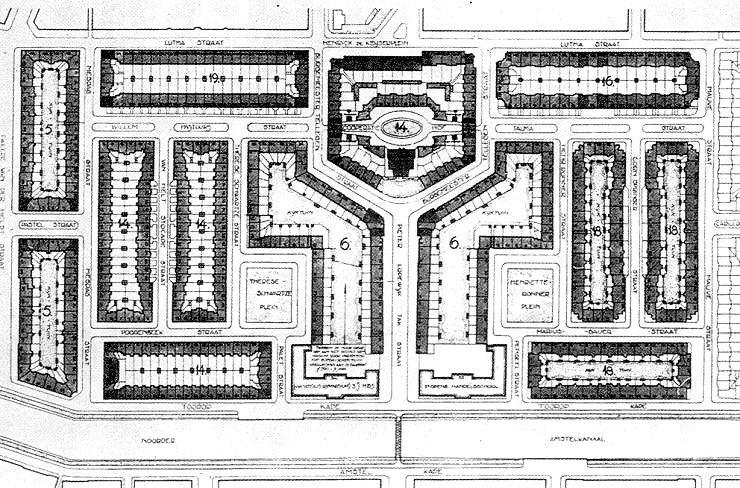
De Dageraad, situation plan, Burgemeester Tellegenstraat = U-shape

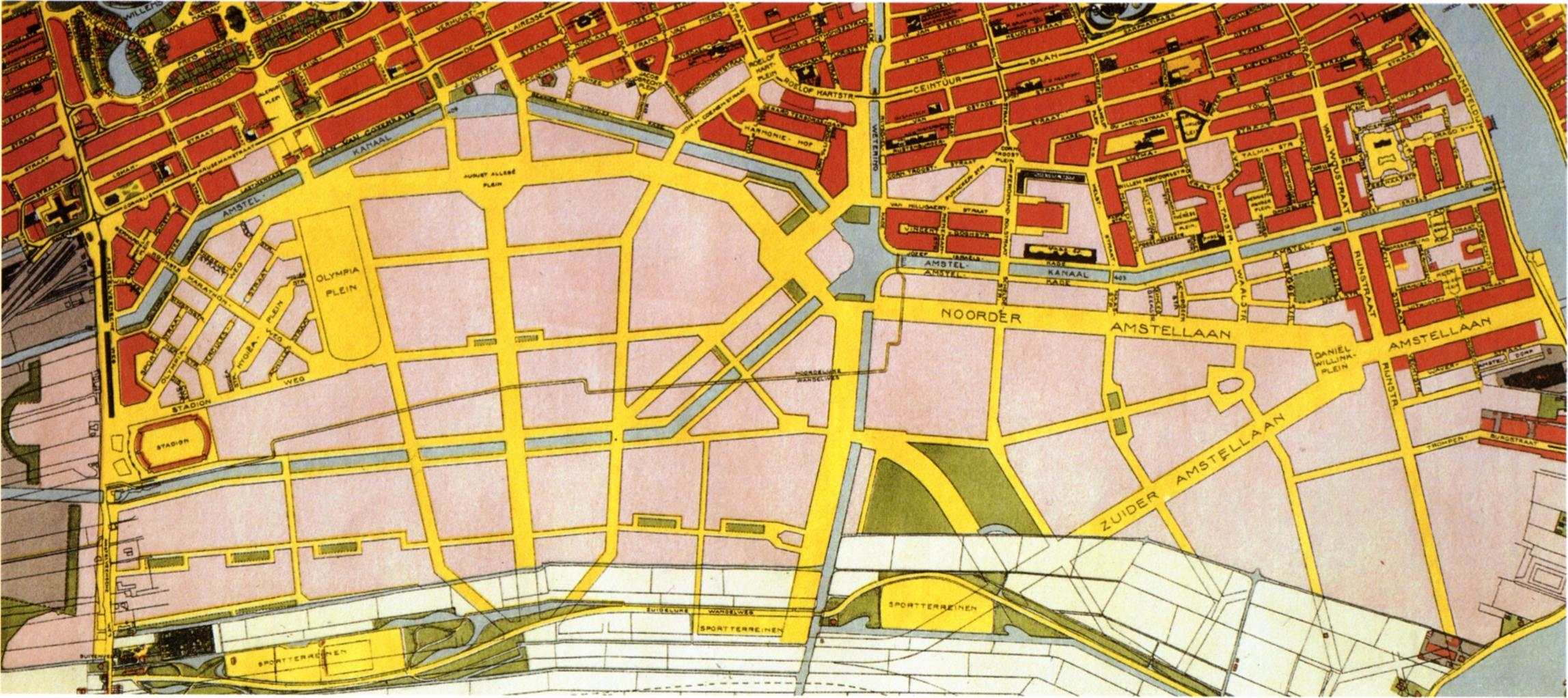
Plan Zuid (Plan South) by Berlage, state of construction 1922. - De Dageraad (r)

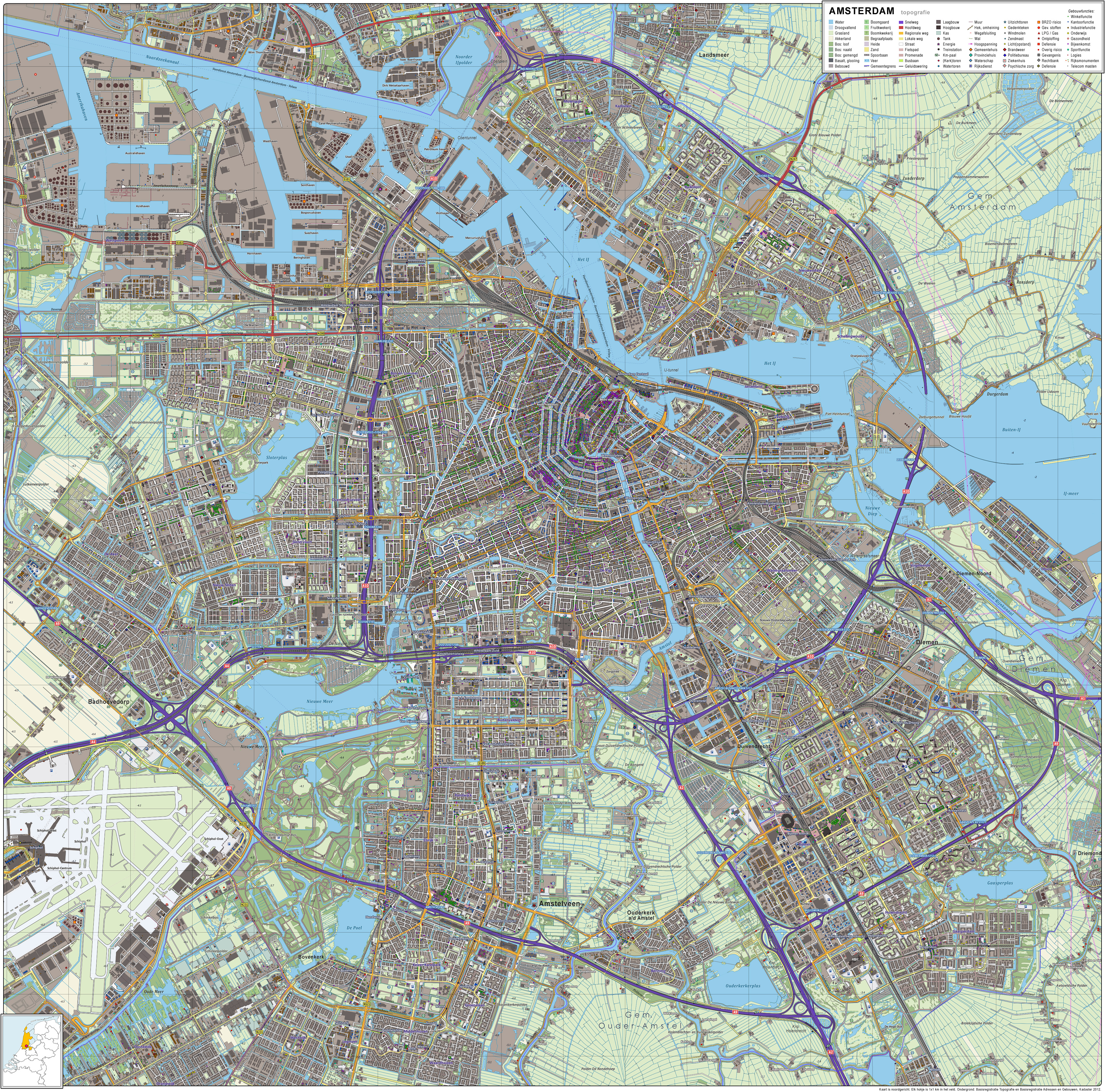
Amsterdam and Amsterdam-South (below)

== Amsterdam West ==
Plan West, working-class Socialist housing. Buildings by different architects of the Amsterdam School (1922–1927).

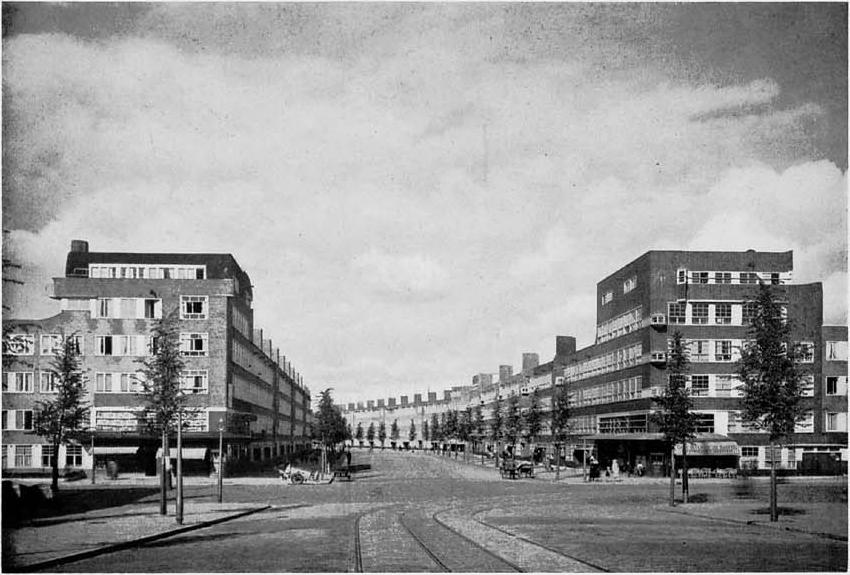
Postjesweg in front / Hoofdweg in perspective (1923–1925)

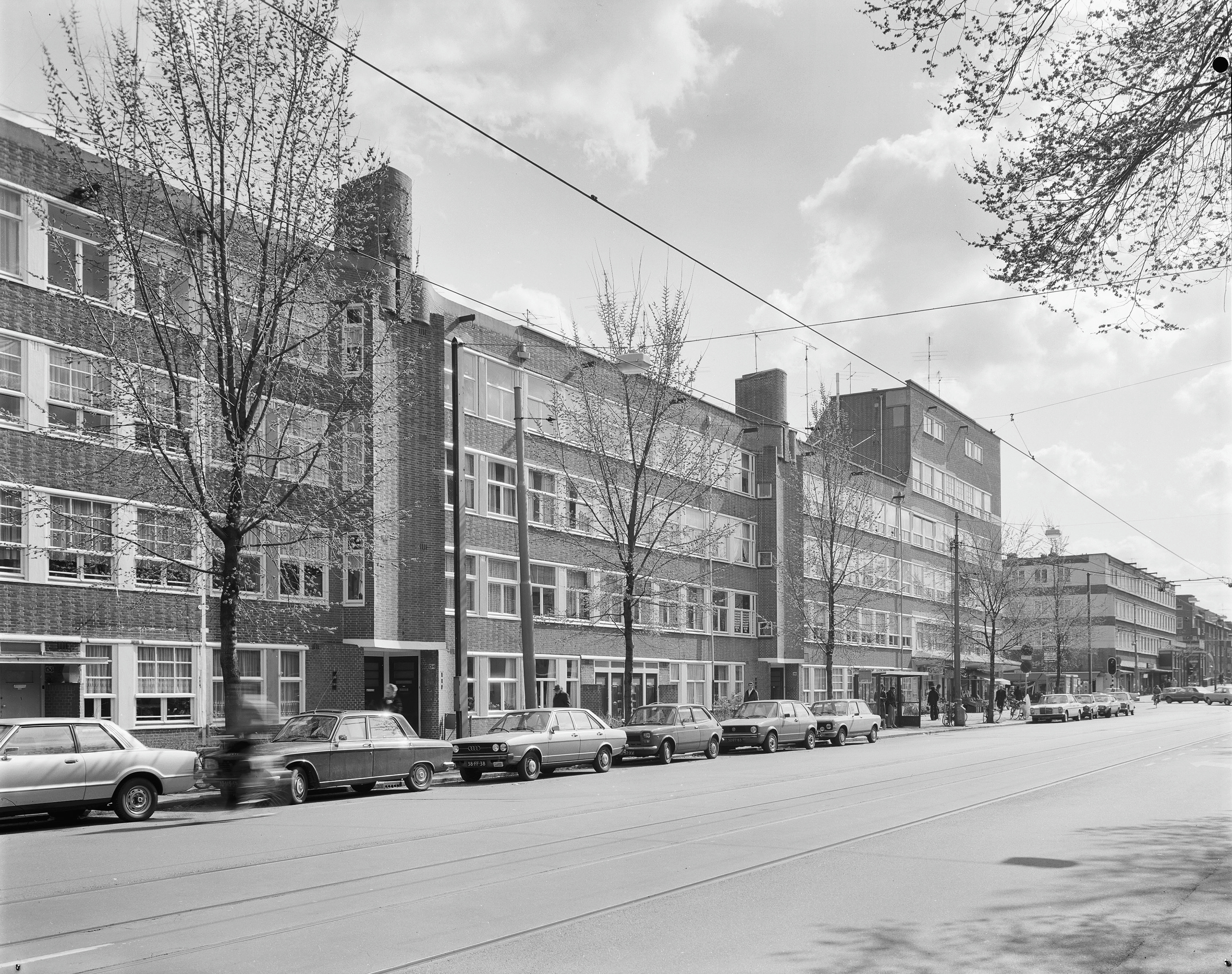
Hoofdweg / Postjesweg

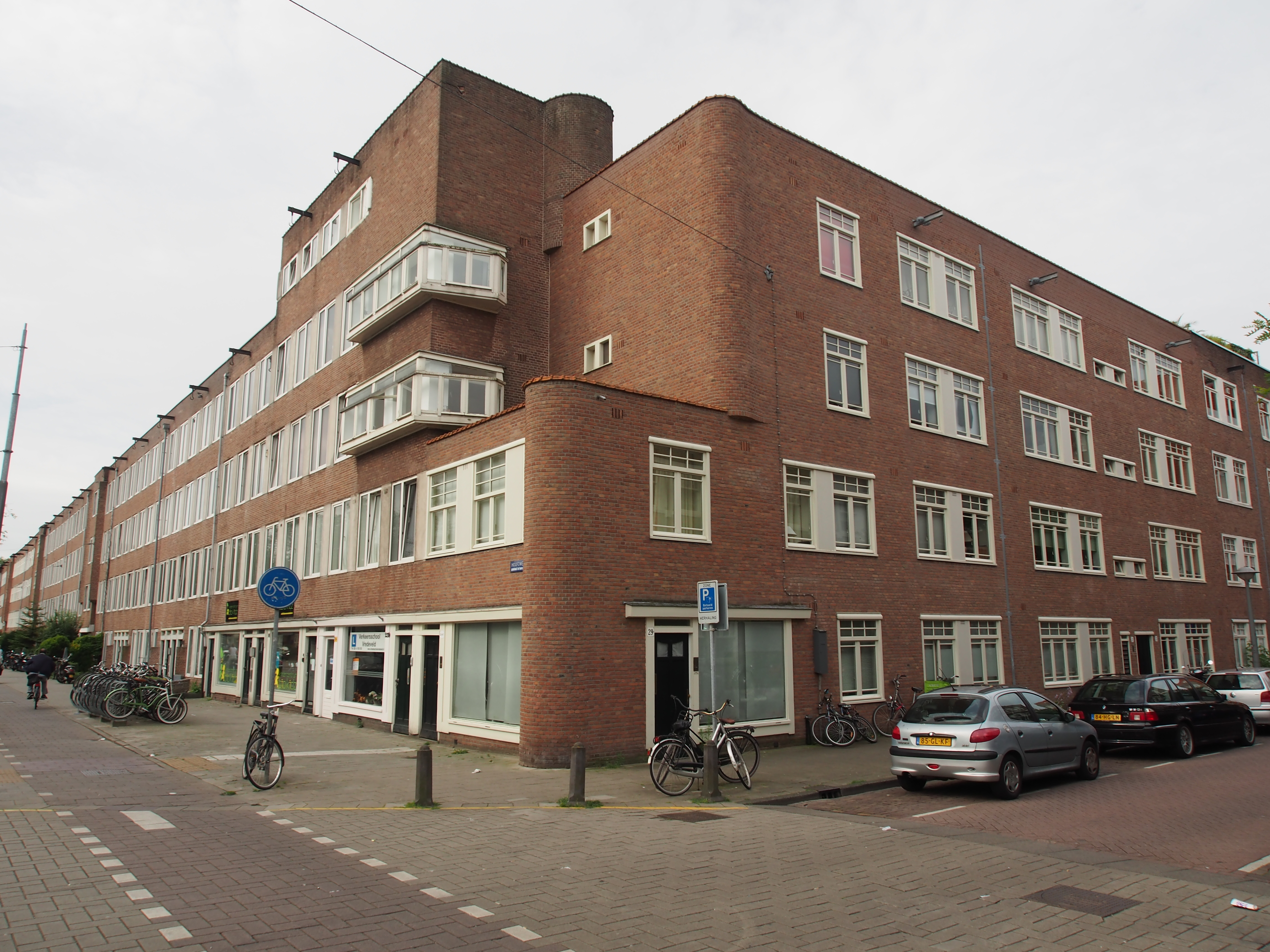
Hoofdweg / Willem Schoutenstraat

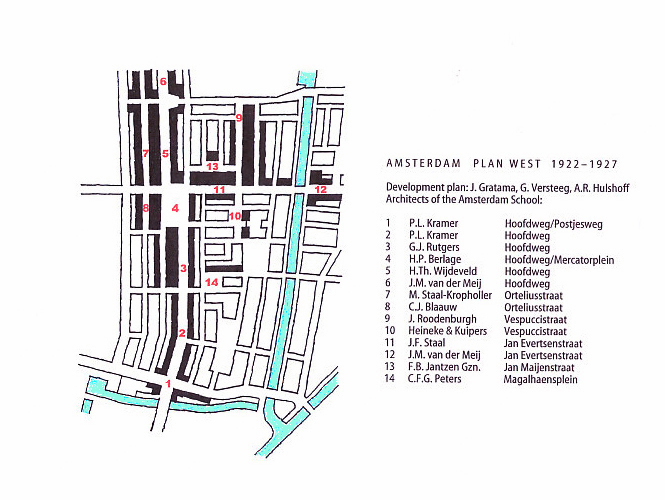
Plan West 1922–1927, architects

== Amsterdam Canal Bridges ==
Piet Kramer made the drawings for more than 500 bridges. The total number of realized Piet Kramer bridges is 220, 64 of them in the Amsterdamse Bos park.

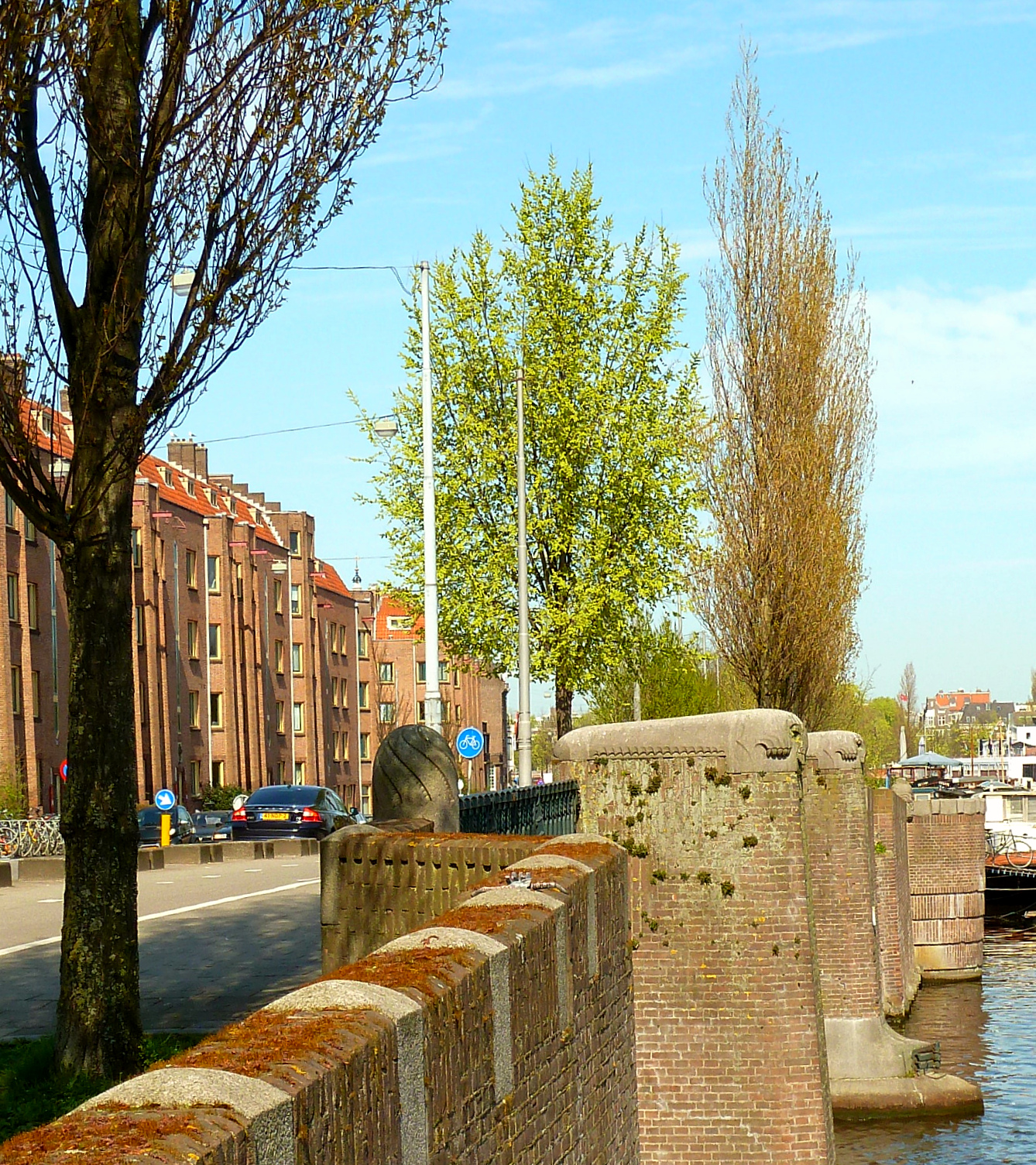
Bridge 400, P.L.Kramer- brug, Amstelkade / Amsteldijk (1921)

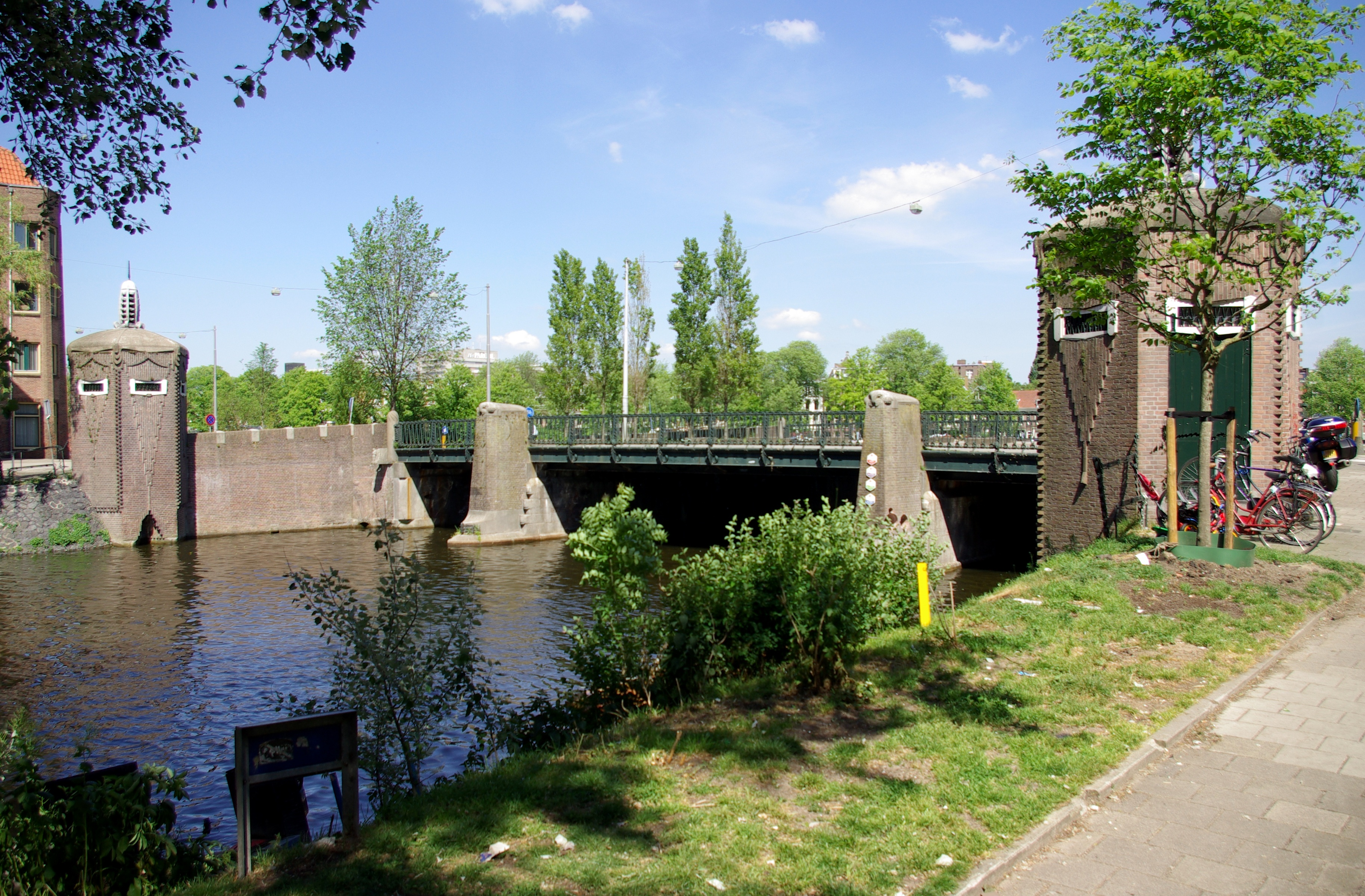
Bridge 400

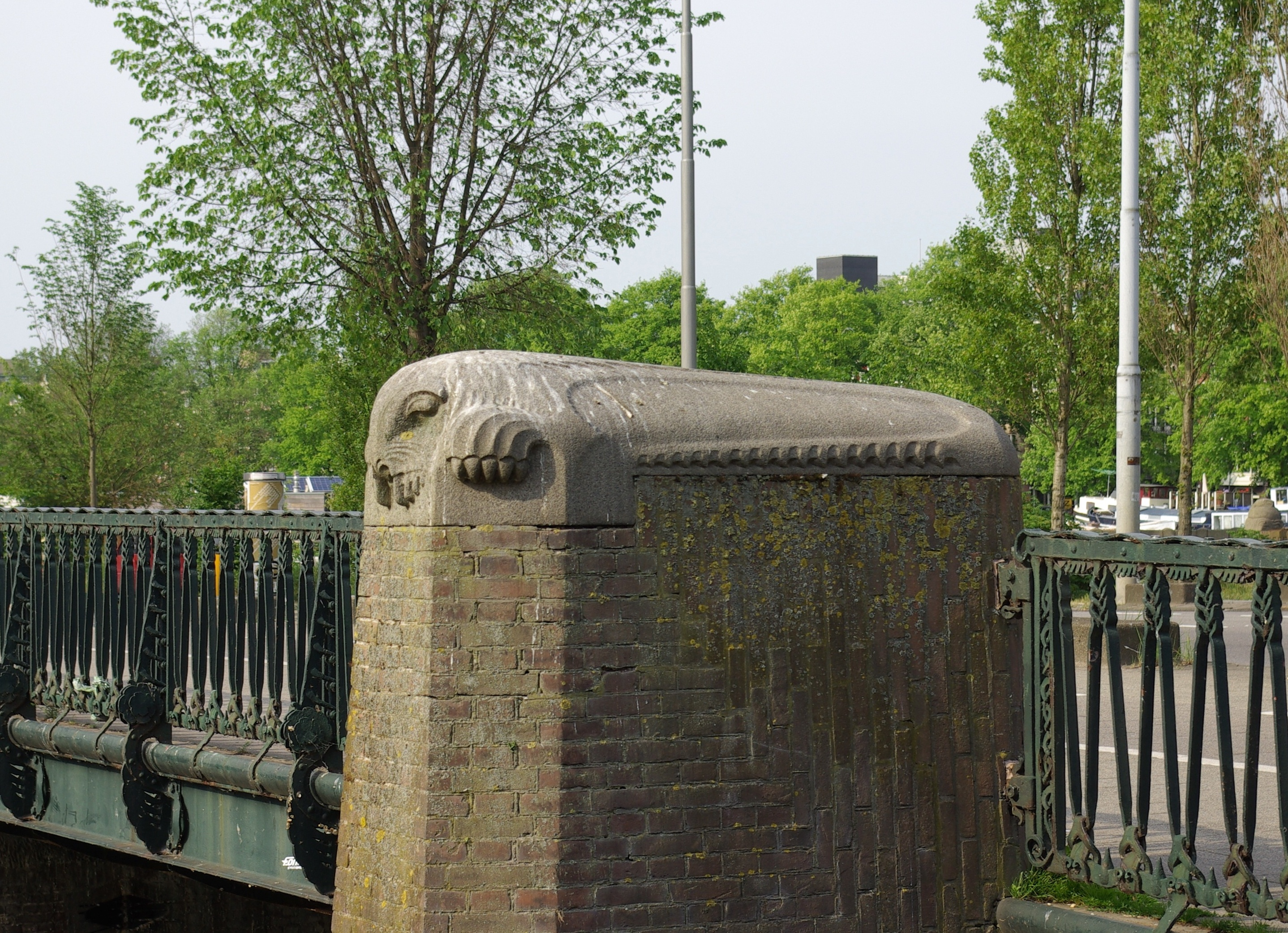
Bridge 400

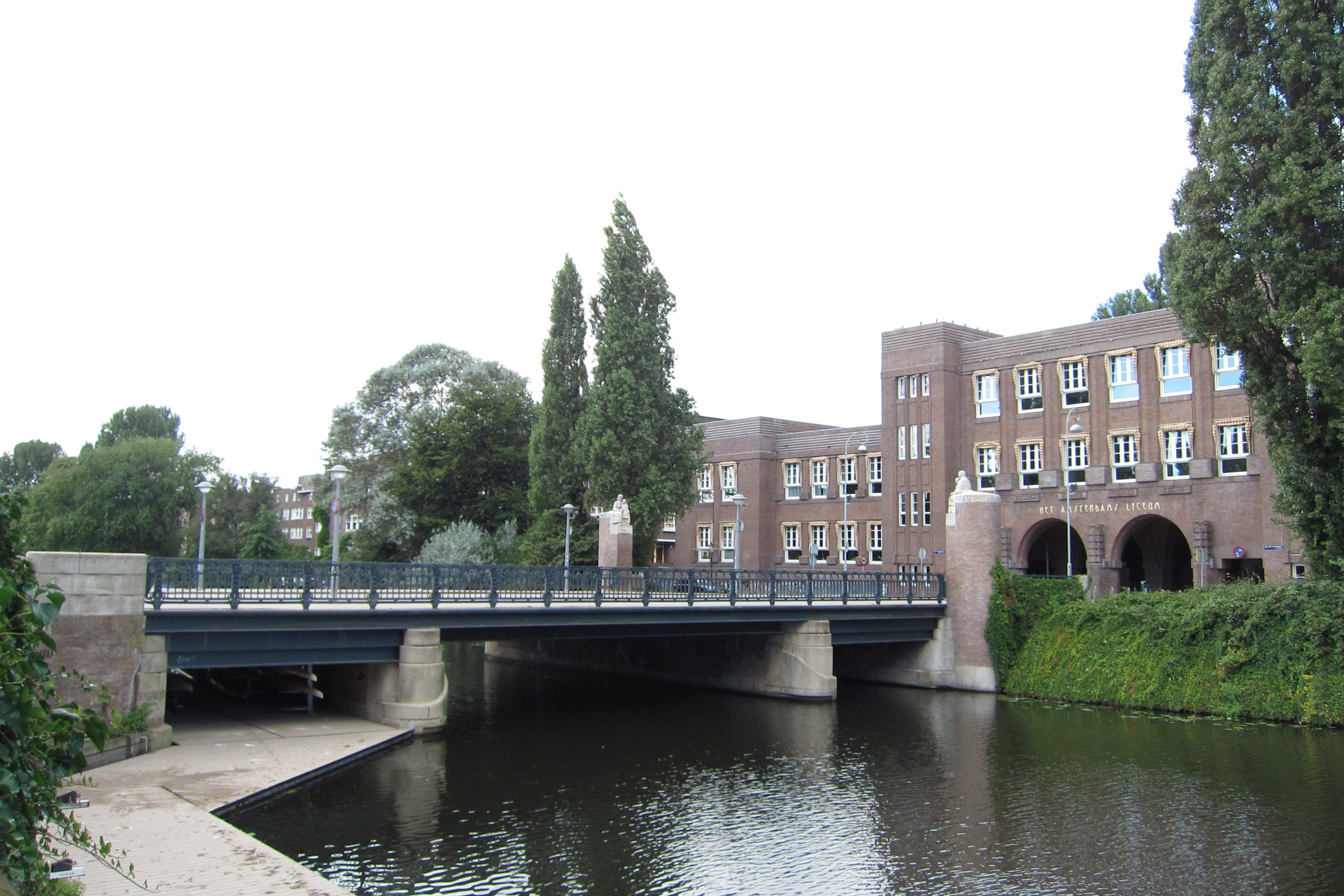
Bridge 410, Lyceumbrug Olympiaplein (1927–1928)

== The Hague ==
De Bijenkorf Store, Grote Marktstraat / Wagenstraat (1924–1926)

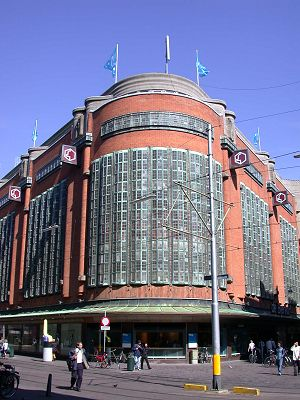

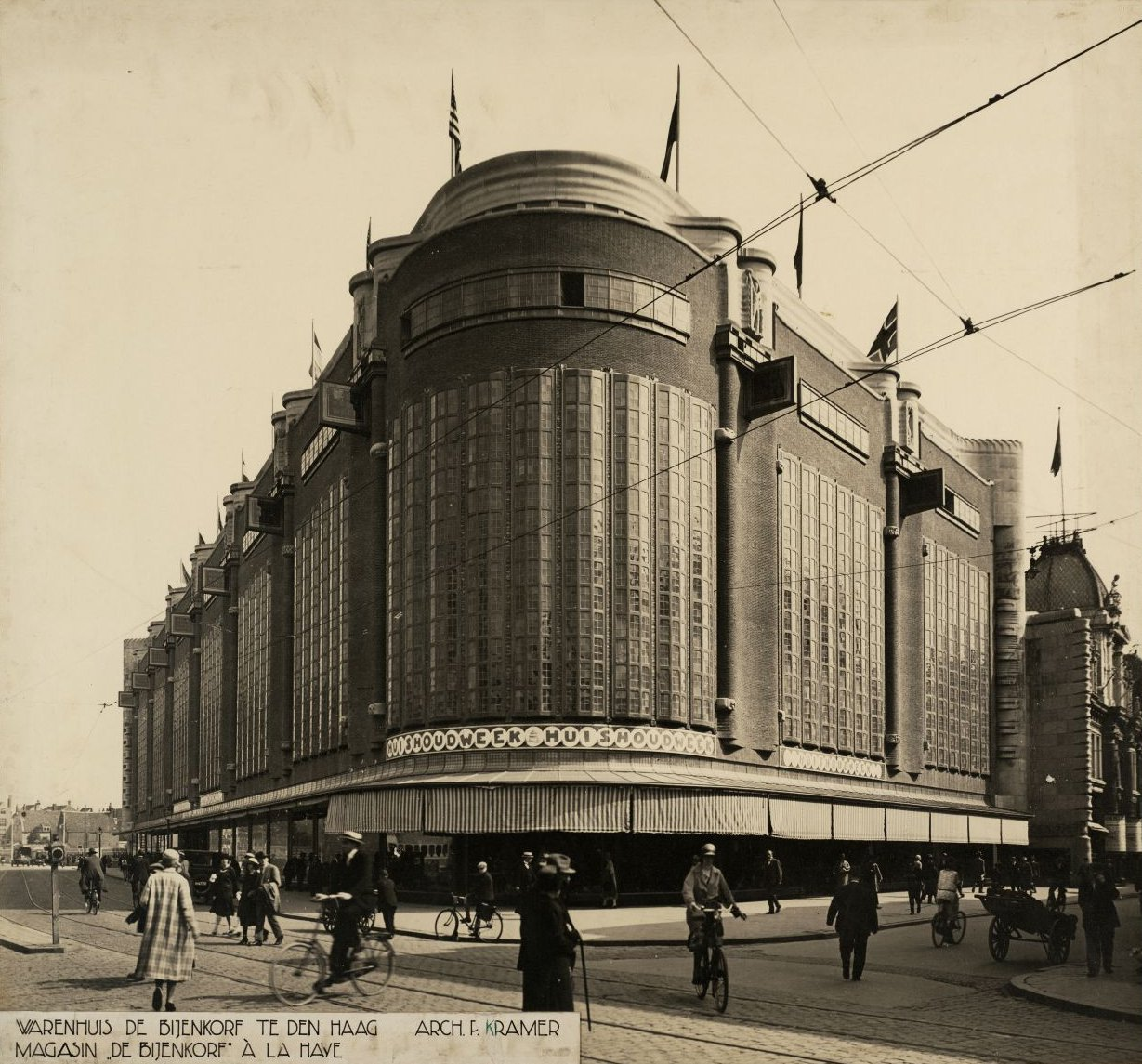

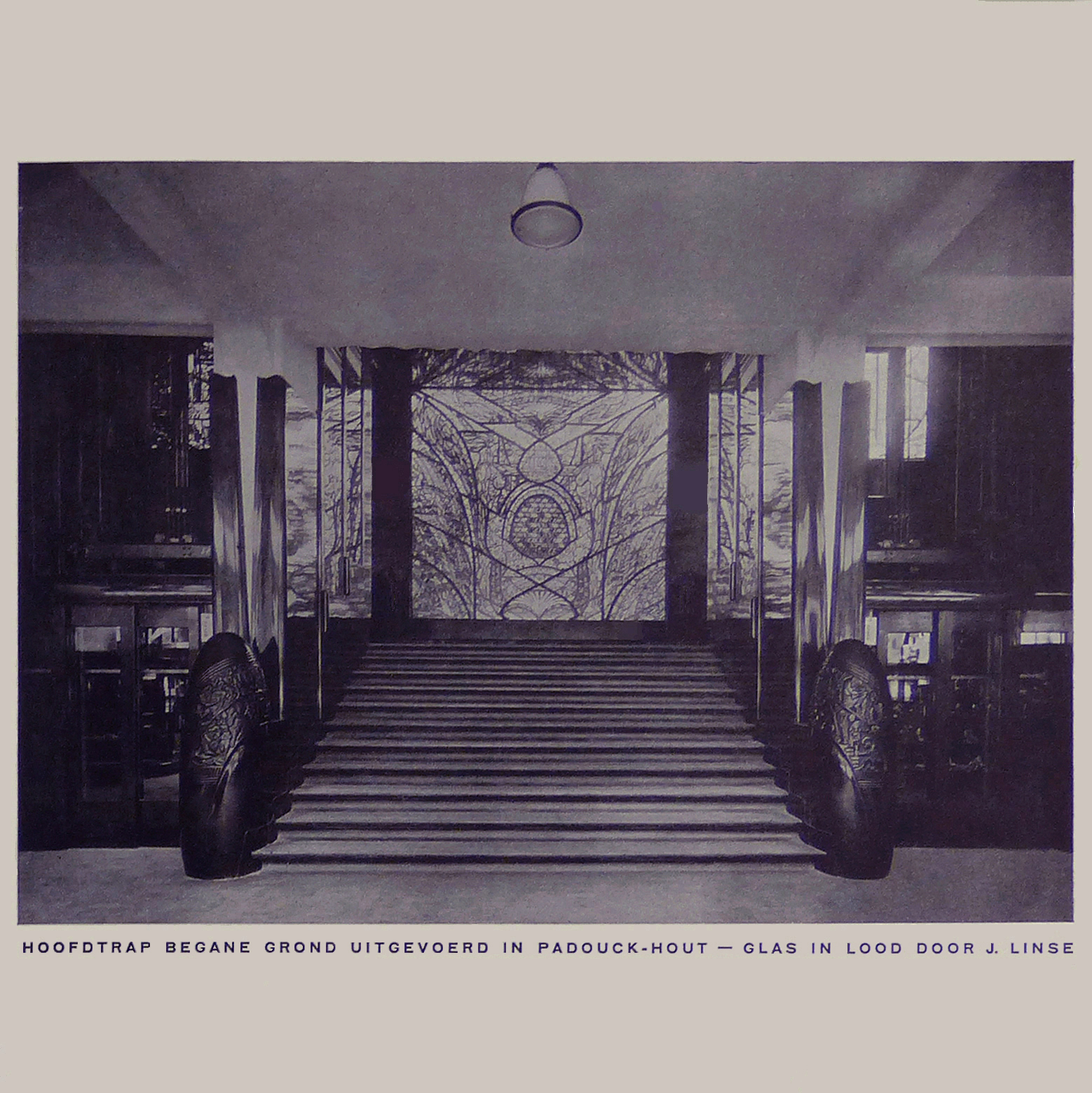
