= Jakoba Mulder =

Dutch architect and urban planner (1900–1988)

Jakoba Helena Mulder
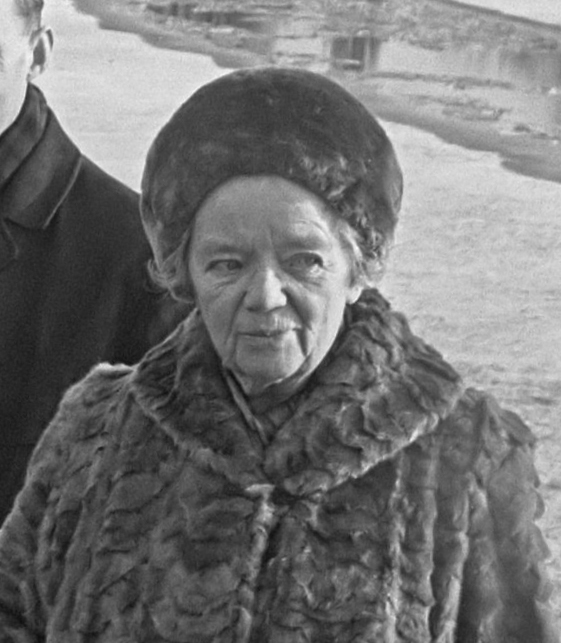
- Jakoba (Ko) Mulder in 1968
- Born: 2 March 1900; Breda, Netherlands
- Died: 5 November 1988 (aged 88); Amsterdam, Netherlands
- Other name: Ko Mulder
- Education: Delft University of Technology
- Occupations: Architect and urban planner

Jakoba Helena Mulder (2 March 1900 – 5 November 1988) was a Dutch architect and urban planner remembered for her designs of two large city parks and the creation of housing and play spaces in Amsterdam.

== Biography ==
When she was 18, Ko Mulder enrolled in the architecture program at the Delft University of Technology as "one of the first girls to apply to study architecture." She completed her degree as a construction engineer in 1926 and was the first female to graduate in the urban design program. According to Dijksterhuis, she met with early success.

When she won a fire station design competition after graduation, her anonymously submitted design was praised for its 'masculine toughness.' The surprise was great when it turned out that the maker was a woman.

In 1926, she was hired by the municipality of Delft to work as a deputy architect on several projects including expansion plans for the town. In 1930, she joined the Amsterdam urban development department as an assistant to the urban development architect and supervising 30 male artists. There she worked for Theodoor K. van Lohuizen and Cornelis van Eesteren, among others.

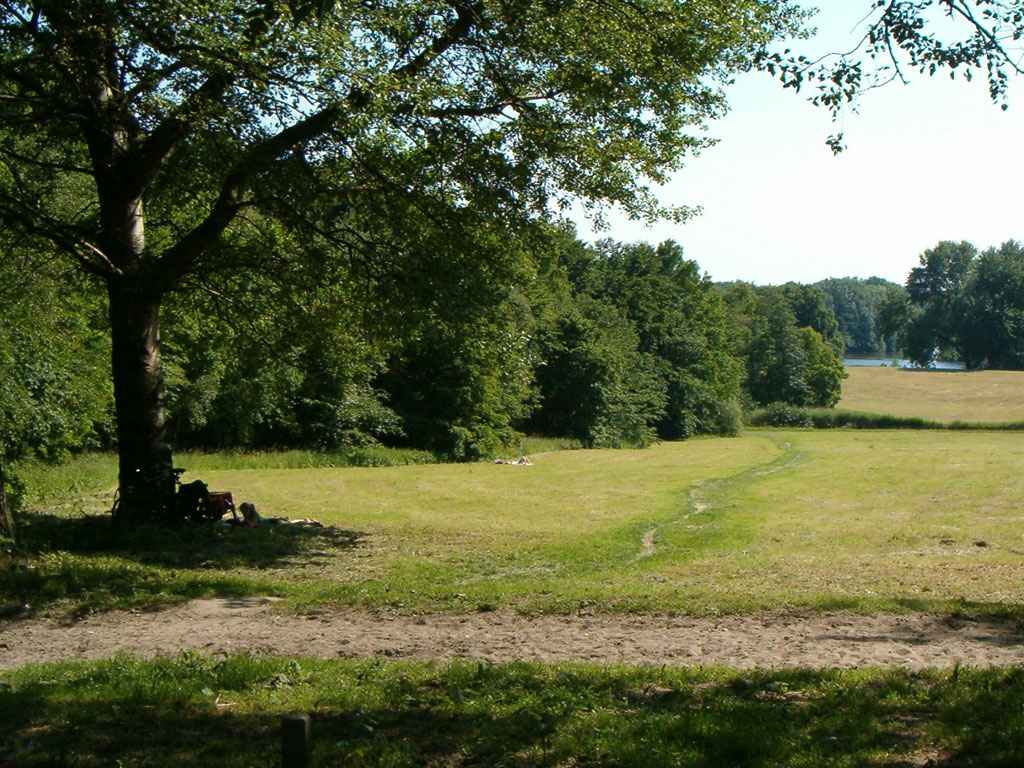
Mulder was an influential designer of the park called Amsterdamse Bos.

=== Amsterdamse Bos park ===
Mulder's first big assignment was the design of Amsterdamse Bos, a 200-acre space in the city that was three times the size of New York’s Central Park. From 1935 until its completion in 1970, Jakoba Mulder was head of the team of various experts in soil science, water management, flora and fauna, and also in sports, nature education and public health.

Throughout her life, she was popularly known as "Miss of the Bos" because of her work and continuing interest in the design of the famously wooded park.

=== Beatrix Park ===
From 1936 to 1939, she designed the city's Beatrix Park, which was named in 1938 after the newly born Princess Beatrix.

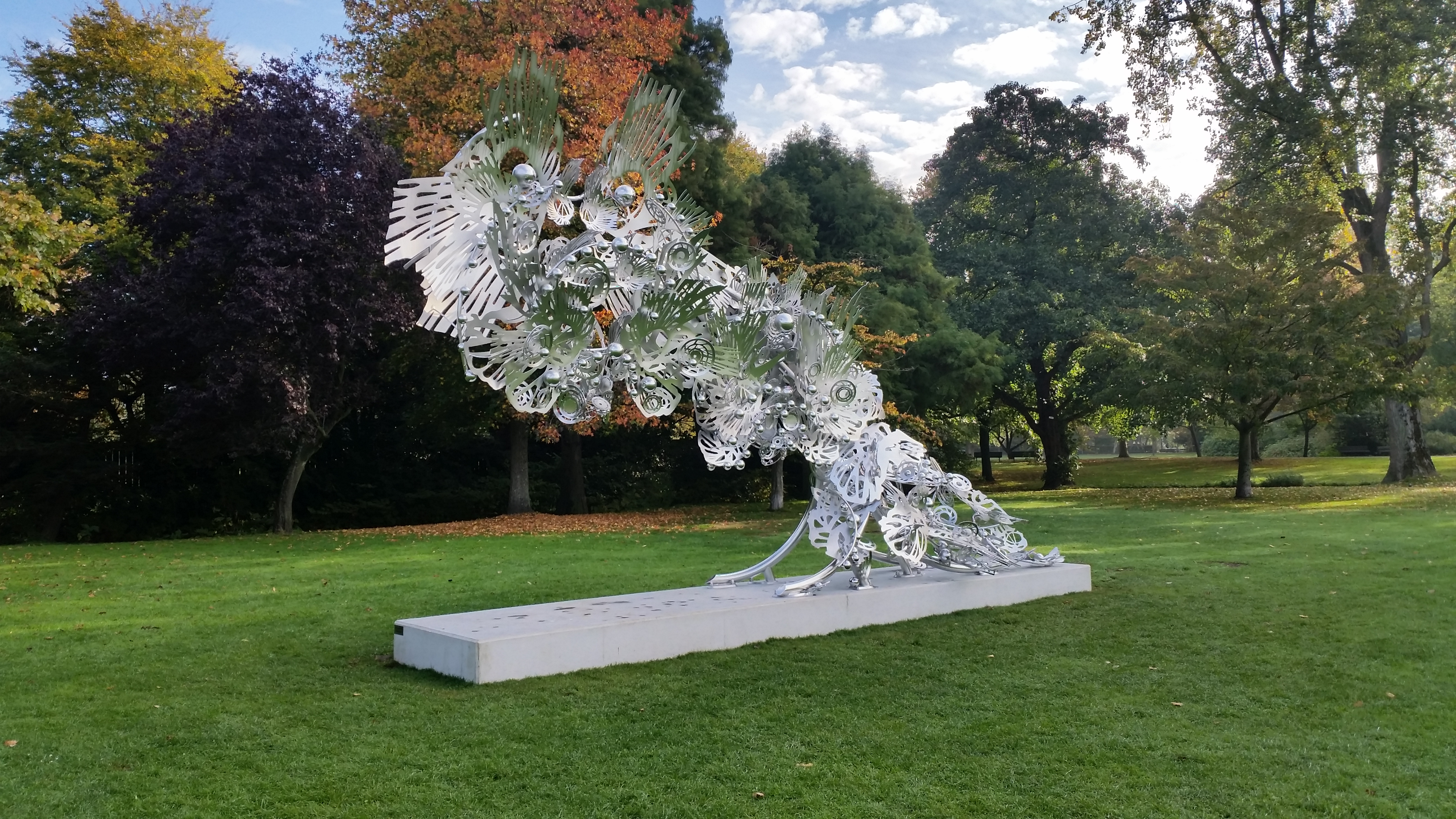
Monument in honor of Mulder erected in Beatrix Park in 2018, called Future Past Glory.

The park now features a monument erected in Mulder's honor titled Future Past Glory. It was designed by the artists Liet Heringa and Maarten van Kalsbeek and installed in 2018.

=== Playgrounds ===
Beginning in 1947, while rebuilding Amsterdam after the devastation of World War II, Mulder was involved in the design of open spaces in cityscapes, preferably for children's play areas. To realize her vision, she worked with the architect Aldo van Eyck who designed playground equipment to fill Mulder's open spaces near new residential apartments, which were themselves creatively situated. According to Dijksterhuis,

She therefore designed a system of hooks and courts: two L-shaped residential blocks that interlock. This resulted in a much more varied picture and more light in the houses. In addition, playgrounds were built in courtyards that mothers could see from the kitchen.

Together van Eyck and Mulder collaborated on more than 700 play spaces in Amsterdam. One example of her play area design that remains today is the Gibraltar Street wading pool that Mulder designed and that still opens every summer.

In 1952 she was named chief architect of Amsterdam and in 1958 succeeded her mentor Cornelis van Eesteren to become head of the city's urban development department where she remained until her retirement in 1965.

== Personal life ==
Mulder was born to an infantry officer, Hendrik Mulder (1874–1947), and Sara Maria Boon (1878–1943). Because her father was serving in the Royal Netherlands East Indies Army, she grew up living in Semarang, Dutch East Indies. She left Indonesia for the Netherlands when she was 13 so she could attend school, living with her aunts and uncles.

She never married and even after retiring from her position with the city, she remained a professor of planning at the University of Amsterdam until her 70th birthday. During her time there, she actively encouraged young women to follow her into the design professions, as noted in a 1947 professional guide, "she praised the 'men's profession' of urban design as very suitable for women."

She was honored as a member of the Order of Orange-Nassau.

== Selected projects ==
- Amsterdamse Bos (1934–1970)
- Park in Spaarnwoude (1936–1938)
- Beatrix Park (1936–1938)
- Jeruzalem Settlement (Amsterdam) (1950–1955)

== External sources ==
- Palstra, Froukje, et al. Ir. Jakoba Mulder (1900-1988).. Netherlands, Stadsdrukkerij, 1994.
