= Landscape park =

Landscape park may refer to:

- Landscape park (protected area), a type of designated natural area in some countries
- Landscape garden
