= Cornelis van Eesteren =

Dutch architect and urban planner (1897–1988)

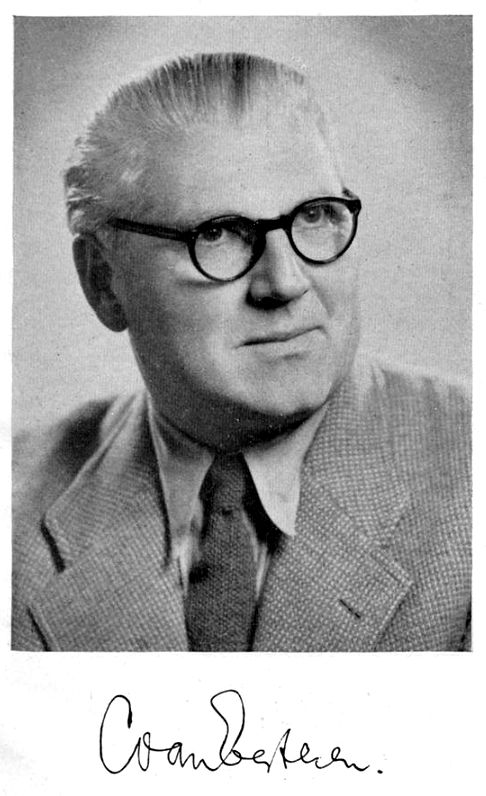
Prof. C. van Eesteren, 1949

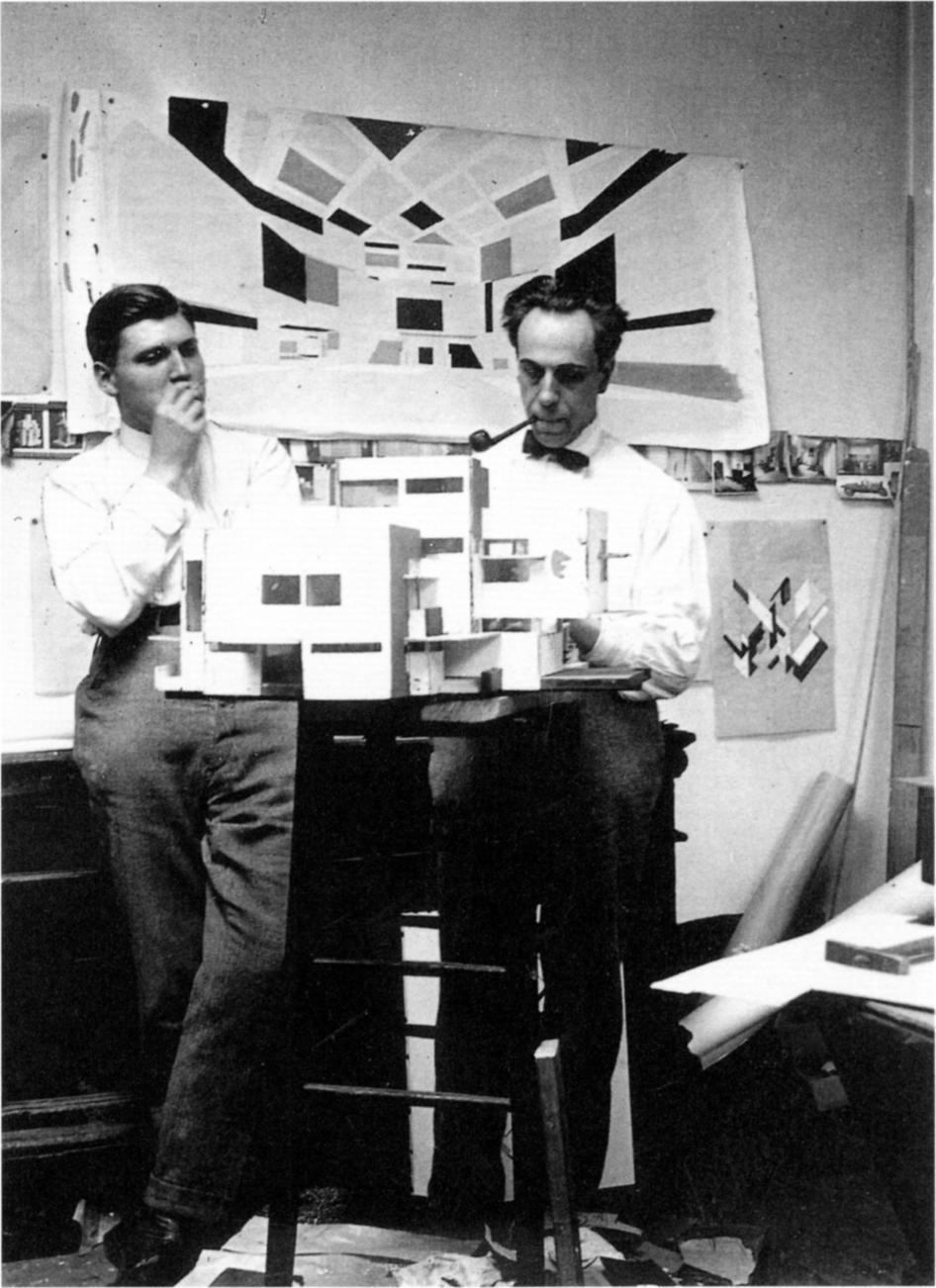
Cornelis van Eesteren (left) with Theo van Doesburg in Paris, 1923

Cornelis van Eesteren (4 July 1897 – 21 February 1988) was a prominent Dutch architect and urban planner who was born in Alblasserdam and died in Amsterdam. He worked for the Town Planning department of Amsterdam (1929–1959) and was the chairman of the CIAM (1930–1947). He contributed to the De Stijl movement, with its founder Theo van Doesburg, the artist Piet Mondrian, and others.

== Career ==
After winning the design competition for the upgrade of the Unter den Linden boulevard in Berlin, in 1927 he became a visiting professor at the Staatliche Bauhochschule in Weimar. From 1929 to 1959 he worked for the Town Planning department of Amsterdam, after which he worked as consultant. After World War II he was appointed professor of urban planning at the Delft University of Technology.

== Projects ==
His key projects include the Amsterdam General Extension Plan, the development plan for the Southern IJsselmeerpolders and the town plan for Lelystad.

== Bibliography ==
- Cornelis van Eesteren and Vincent van Rossem (1998) The Idea of the Functional City, NAi Publishers, ISBN 978-9056620561
