= List of converts to Sikhism =

People who converted to Sikhi

The following is a list of people who converted to Sikhi. The religion of Sikhi emerged from 15th century South Asia. The first Sikhs came from Hindu and Muslim backgrounds from the Punjab region. Following 20th century, the growth of the Sikh diaspora enabled the spread of Sikhism, thus allowing for more people to similarly embrace the faith. Overall laterally in the period of 16th century India, it have been astonishingly witnessed more than One—third of the Sikh population are sizeably reinforced from the following member of Jat community due to idealistic way of teaching professed by the campions of Guru Angad.

== 15th century ==
- Bhai Mardana – Rubabi convert from Islam to Sikhi.
- Bhai Bala – childhood friend and companion of Bhai Mardana and Guru Nanak converted from Hindusim to Sikhism.

== 17th century ==
- Bhai Dayala – accompanied Guru Tegh Bahadur in martyrdom at Delhi.
- Bhai Mati Das – accompanied Guru Tegh Bahadur in martyrdom at Delhi.
- Bhai Sati Das – accompanied Guru Tegh Bahadur in martyrdom at Delhi.

== 18th century ==
- Banda Singh Bahadur – Born into a Hindu family as Lachman Dev (later Madho Das Bairagi), after meeting with Guru Gobind Singh he became a Sikh warrior for the Khalsa Army.

== 19th century ==
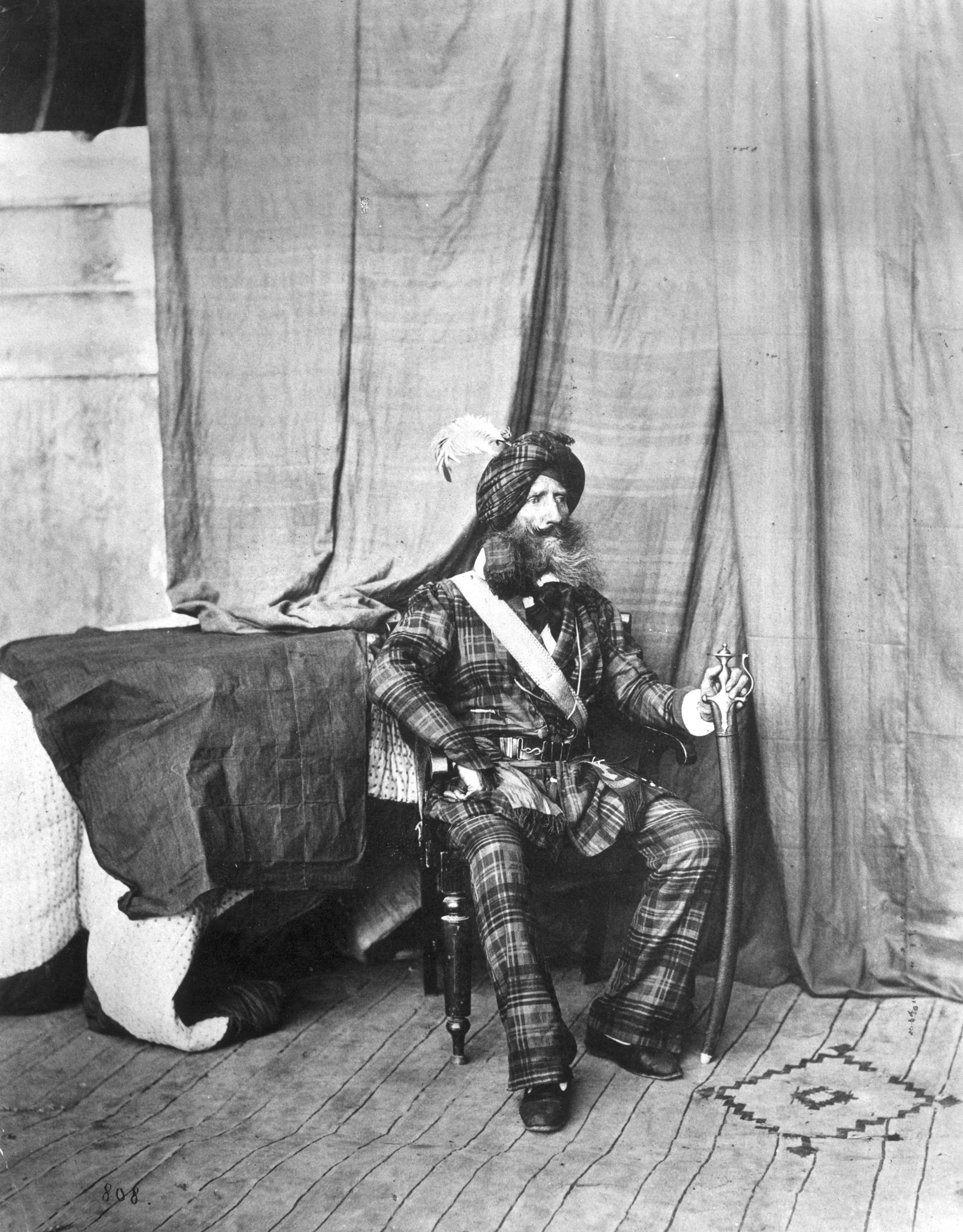
Colonel Alexander Gardner, American Sikh Soldier in Maharaja Ranjit Singh's Army

- Alexander Gardner – American Sikh Soldier in Maharaja Ranjit Singh's army.
- Maharaja Duleep Singh – Born in a Sikh family, but converted to Angilican Christianity as a ward of the British state. Rejoined as a Sikh in 1864.
- Max Arthur Macauliffe (1841–1913) – senior administrator of the British Raj who was posted in the Punjab; prolific scholar and author. Chided as "turning a Sikh" and died reciting the Japji Sahib prayer in 1913.

== 20th century ==
- Bhagat Puran Singh (1904–1992) – great visionary; accomplished environmentalist; founder of the "All India Pingalwara Charitable Society; being deeply influenced by the teachings of Sri Guru Granth Sahib, he converted to Sikhi.
- Sahib Singh – renowned Sikh academic who made a tremendous contribution to Sikh literature.
- Master Tara Singh – prominent Sikh political and religious leader in the first half of the 20th century

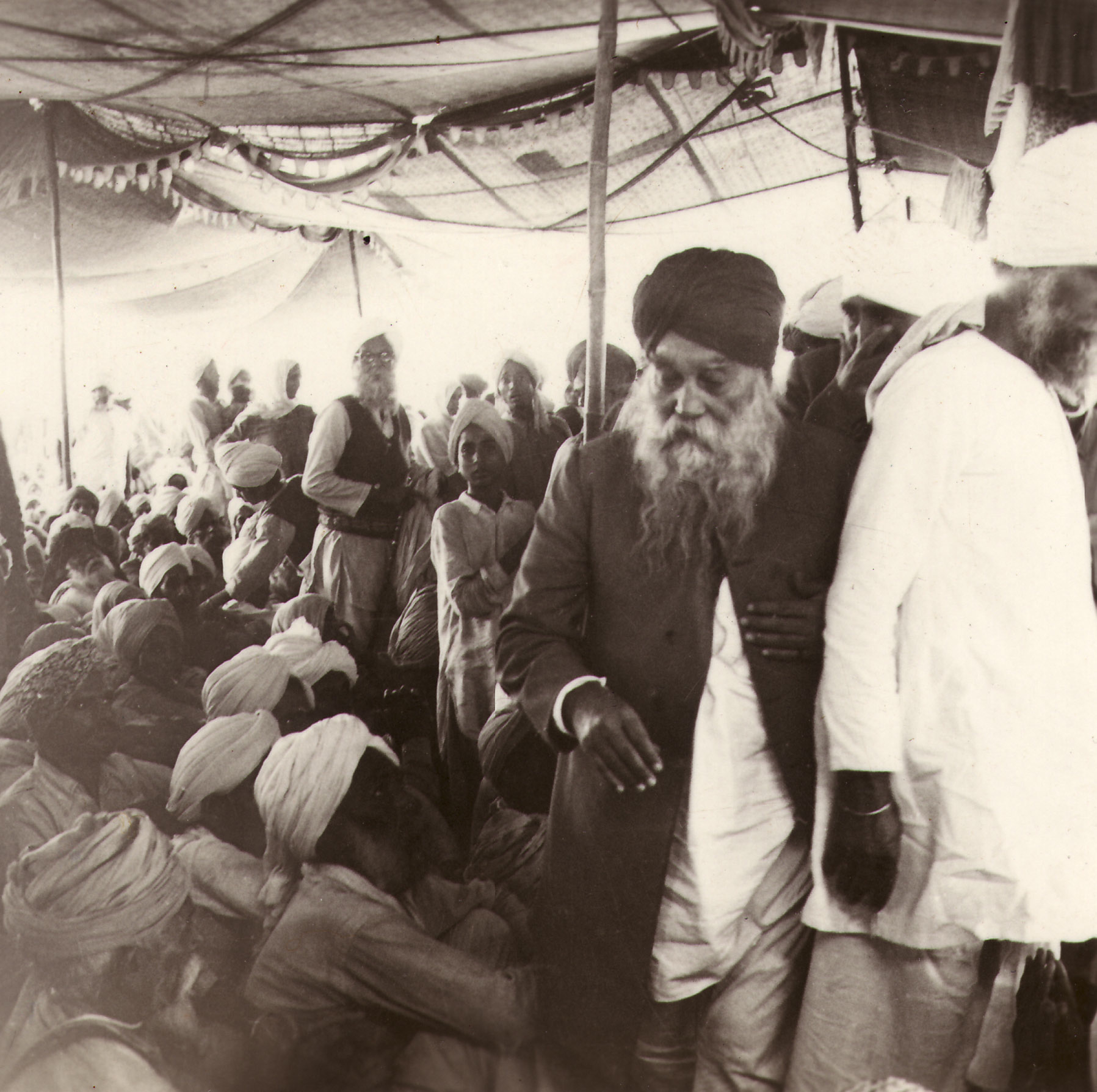
Master Tara Singh, a prominent Sikh leader during Indian Independence and Akali Movement

- Teja Singh – active member of the Singh Sabha movement
- Muhammad Sadiq – Punjabi folk singer and actor turned politician. Currently serves as a Member of Parliament, Lok Sabha in Faridkot, Punjab

== 21st century ==
- Babaji Singh – credited with translating the Guru Granth Sahib, the central Sikh scripture, into the Spanish language.
- Martin Singh – Nova Scotia pharmacist and businessman and candidate for the leadership of the New Democratic Party of Canada in 2012.
- Ryan Hurst – American actor, practices Sikhi under the 3HO tradition as Gobind Seva Singh.
- Vic Briggs – British Blues musician, changed his name to Vikram Singh Khalsa; became the first non-subcontinental to perform kirtan at Harmandir Sahib
- Gurmukh Kaur Khalsa – Yoga teacher; co-founder and director of the Golden Bridge Yoga Center in Los Angeles, California
- Vikram Kaur Khalsa – Former model and actress, starred in several horror movies
- Tyler Atkins – Also known as Tera Singh, is an Australian film director and actor. Most recently known for his completed production on his debut feature film, Bosch & Rockit, which he wrote, directed, and produced.

== See also ==
- Jat Sikh
- Maharaja Ranjit Singh
- List of converts to Buddhism
- List of converts to Islam
- List of converts to Hinduism
- List of converts to the Baháʼí Faith
- List of people by belief
