= Bhai Mati Das =

Indian Sikh martyr (died 1675)

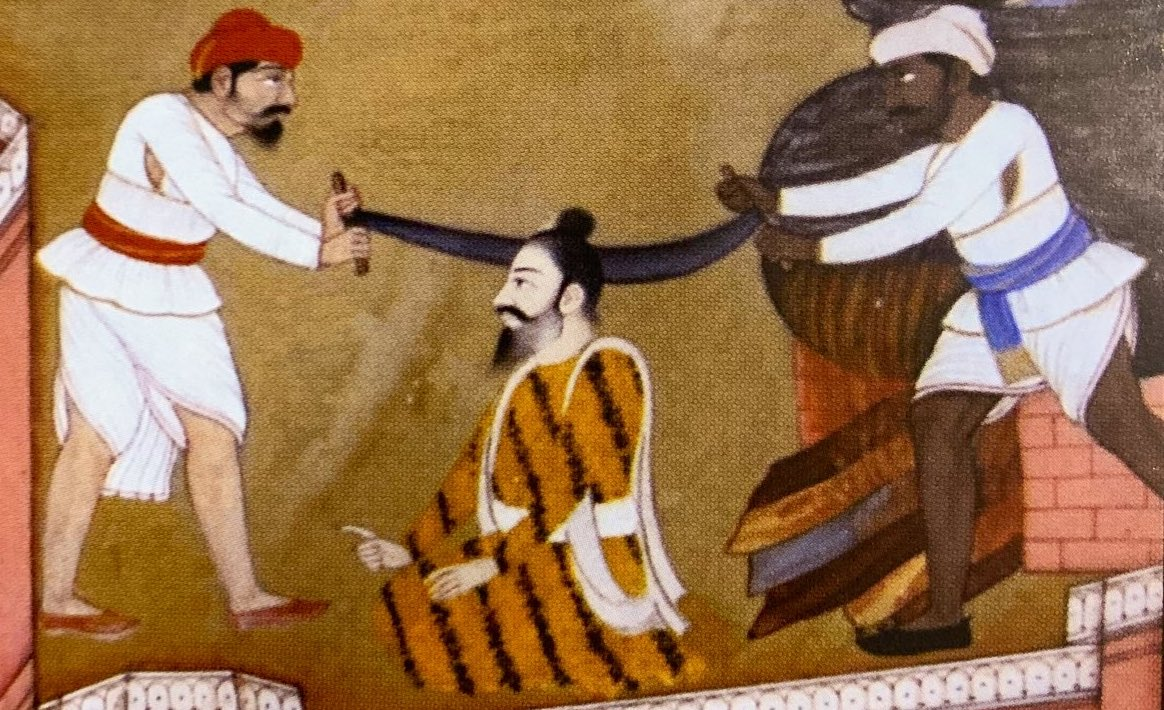
- Sikh martyr Bhai Mati Das being executed by being sawed in half while alive, detail of a work by the court painter Basahatullah, circa 19th century
- Born: 1641; Karyala, Jhelum, Punjab, Mughal Empire, (now Pakistan)
- Died: 11 November 1675 (aged 33–34); Chandni Chowk, Delhi, Mughal Empire (now India)
- Cause of death: Death by sawing
- Father: Bhai Hira Nand

Bhai Mati Das (Punjabi: ਭਾਈ ਮਤੀ ਦਾਸ; died 11 November 1675; also known as Dewan Mati Dasa), along with his younger brother Bhai Sati Das were martyrs of early Sikh history. Bhai Mati Das, Bhai Dayala, and Bhai Sati Das were executed at a kotwali (police-station) in the Chandni Chowk area of Delhi, under the express orders of Emperor Aurangzeb just before the martyrdom of Guru Tegh Bahadur. Bhai Mati Das was executed by being bound between two pillars and sawed in two.

== Biography ==
=== Birth ===
Bhai Mati Das belonged to a (Saraswat) Mohyal Brahmin family of the Chhibber clan. He lived in the ancient village of Karyala, about ten kilometres from Chakwal on the road to the Katas Raj Temples in the Jhelum District in the Punjab region of Pakistan. Bhai Sati Das was his younger brother. Bhai Mati Das was the son of Hira Nand, a disciple of Guru Har Gobind, under whom he had fought in many battles and was a great warrior. Hira Nand was the grandson of Lakhi Das, the son of the Bhai Praga, who was also a martyr and had been a Jathedar (leader) in Guru Hargobind's first battle.

=== Service of Guru Tegh Bahadur ===
During the time after Guru Har Krishan Sahib Ji’s physical disappearance at Delhi, and the uncertainty over who would be the next Guru, Bhai Mati Das, and Bhai Sati Das are sometimes mentioned as being present looking for the Guru or directly after when Baba Makhan Shah Labana found Guru Tegh Bahadur in the village of Bakala where the new Guru was then residing.

The new Guru entrusted all his financial activities to Bhai Mati Das, and thus he is sometimes given the name Diwan Mati Das, whereas Bhai Sati Das served Guru Tegh Bahadur as a cook. The two brothers accompanied Guru Teg Bahadur during his two-year stay at Assam. Guru Tegh Bahadur then bought a hillock near the village of Makhowal five miles north of Kiratpur and established a new town, Chakk Nanaki now named Anandpur Sahib (the abode of bliss) where Bhai Mati Das and Bhai Sati Das also resided.

==== The Guru's eastern tours ====
Bhai Mati Das and Bhai Sati Das were present on the Guru's eastern tours beginning in August 1665 including the tours of Saifabad and Dhamtan (Bangar) where they were arrested perhaps because of the influence of Dhir Mal, or the Ulemas and orthodox Brahmins. The Guru was sent to Delhi and detained for one month. After being freed in December 1665, he continued his tour and Bhai Mati Das and Bhai Sati Das were again in his company particularly at Dhaka and Malda.

=== Guru's Arrest ===
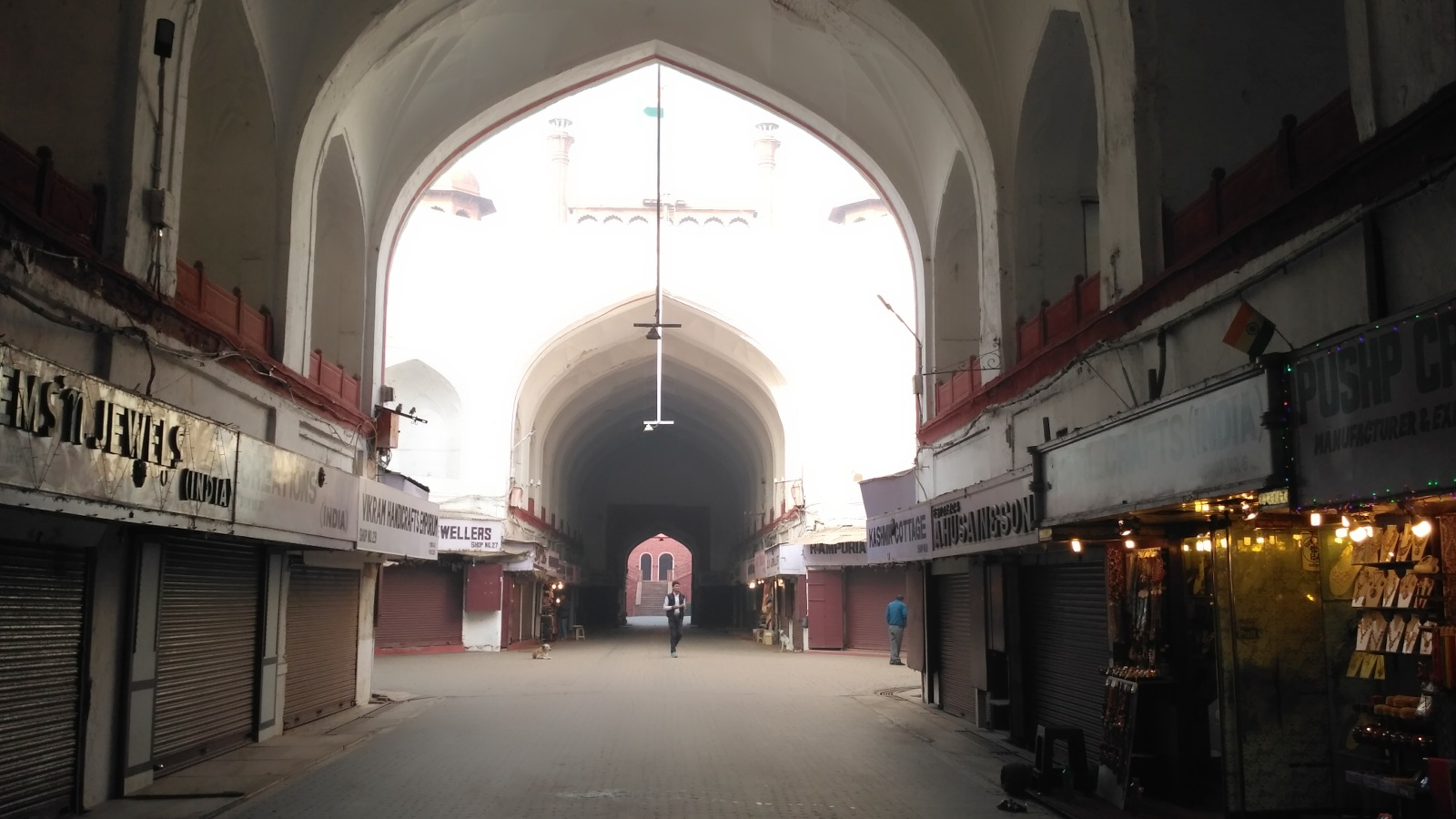
Inside view of Red Fort at Chandni Chowk, Delhi

In 1675 the Guru was summoned by Emperor Aurangzeb to Delhi to convert to Islam. Aurangzeb was very happy that all he had to do was convert one man and the rest of the Hindus from Kashmir, Kurukshetra, Hardwar, and Beneras would follow suit. The Guru left for Delhi on his own accord but was arrested at Malikpur Rangharan near Ropar. While the Guru was traveling towards Delhi his company at this time consisted of his most devoted Sikhs including Bhai Dayala, Bhai Udai, and Bhai Jaita (Rangretta) as well as Bhai Mati Das and Bhai Sati Das. After visiting a few places where large crowds of devotees had gathered the Guru sent Bhai Jaita and Bhai Udai to Delhi to scout ahead and report back to him and to Anandpur as well.

After being arrested Guru Tegh Bahadur was taken to Sirhind and from there he was sent to Delhi in an iron cage. At Delhi, the Guru and his five companions were taken into the council chamber of the Red Fort. The Guru was asked numerous questions on religion, Hinduism, Sikhism and Islam, such as why he was sacrificing his life for people who wear the Janeu and the Tilak when he himself was a Sikh. The Guru answered that these are powerless and weak against tyranny. They had come to the abode of Guru Nanak as refuge, and with the same logic he would have sacrificed his life for Muslims as well. On the Guru's emphatic refusal to abjure his faith, he was asked why he was called Teg Bahadur (gladiator or Knight of the Sword; before this, his name had been Tyag Mal). Bhai Mati Das immediately replied that the Guru had won the title by inflicting a heavy blow on the imperial forces at the young age of fourteen. Guru Tegh Bahadur Sahib Ji and his companions were ordered to be imprisoned and tortured until they agreed to embrace Islam.

=== Guru's Martyrdom ===
After a few days, Guru Tegh Bahadur and three of his companions were again brought before the Qazi of the city and again the Sikhs repeated their sentiments. Bhai Mati Das was offered marriage of the Nawab's daughter as well as governorship of the province if he converted to Islam.

On November 11, 1675, large crowds gathered to see the Guru and the executioners were called to the kotwali (police-station) near the Sunehri Masjid in the Chandni Chowk. The Guru, who was kept in an iron cage, and his three companions were moved to the place of execution. Mughal Empire records from the 17th century explain Bhai Mati Das' death as punishment for challenging the authorities. Bhai Mati Das, Bhai Dayala and Bhai Sati Das were then tortured and executed.

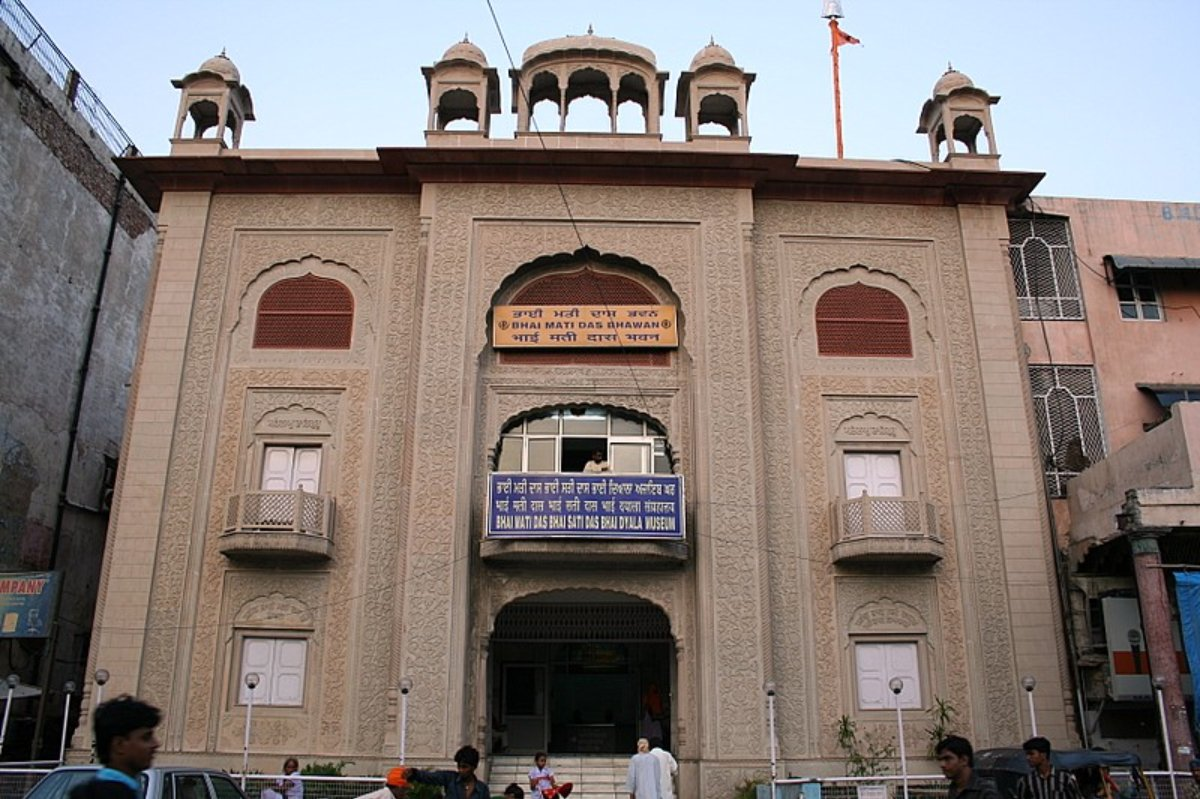
Bhai Matidas Bhawan

==== Martyrdom of Bhai Mati Das ====
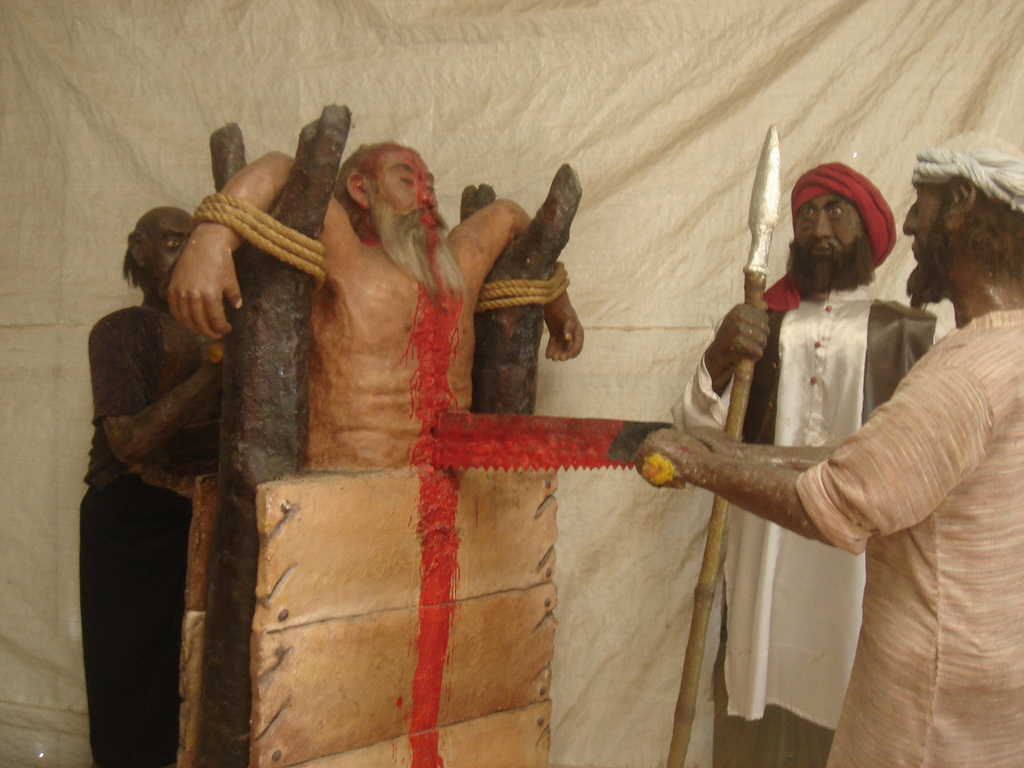
Diorama rendering of the execution of Bhai Mati Das by the Mughals. This display is at a Sikh Ajaibghar near the towns of Mohali and Sirhind in Punjab, India

Bhai Mati Das, the first to be martyred, was asked if he had any final wishes. He replied that he desired to be facing towards the guru on his execution. Bhai Mati Das was made to stand erect between two posts and a double headed saw was placed on his head and he was sawed from his head to his loins. While this was happening, Bhai Mati Das recited the Japuji Sahib. There is a mystical belief that the recitation of the Gurbani continued and was completed even though the body was in two distinct halves. Seeing this, Dyal Das abused the Emperor and his courtiers for this infernal act.

==== Martyrdom of Bhai Dayala and Bhai Sati Das ====
Bhai Dayala was tied up like a round bundle and put into a huge bronze cauldron of boiling oil. He was roasted alive into a block of charcoal. No sign of grief was shown by the disciples of the Guru and the Guru also witnessed this savagery with divine calm.

Bhai Sati Das was tied to a pole and wrapped in cotton fibre. He was then set on fire by the executioner. He remained calm and peaceful and kept uttering Waheguru Gurmantar, while fire consumed his body.

==== Martyrdom of the Guru ====
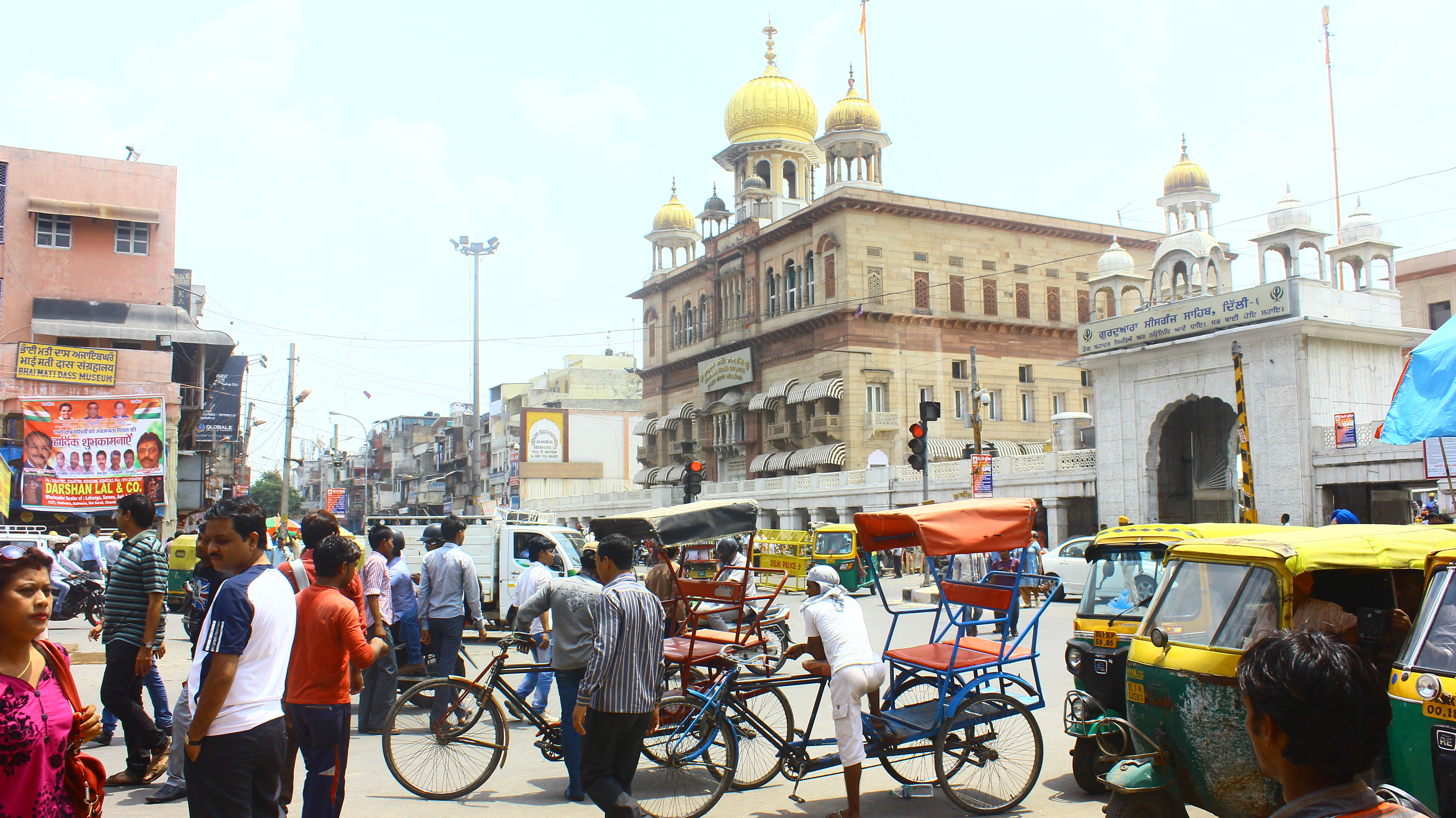
Gurudwara Sis Ganj Sahib, Chandni Chowk, Delhi

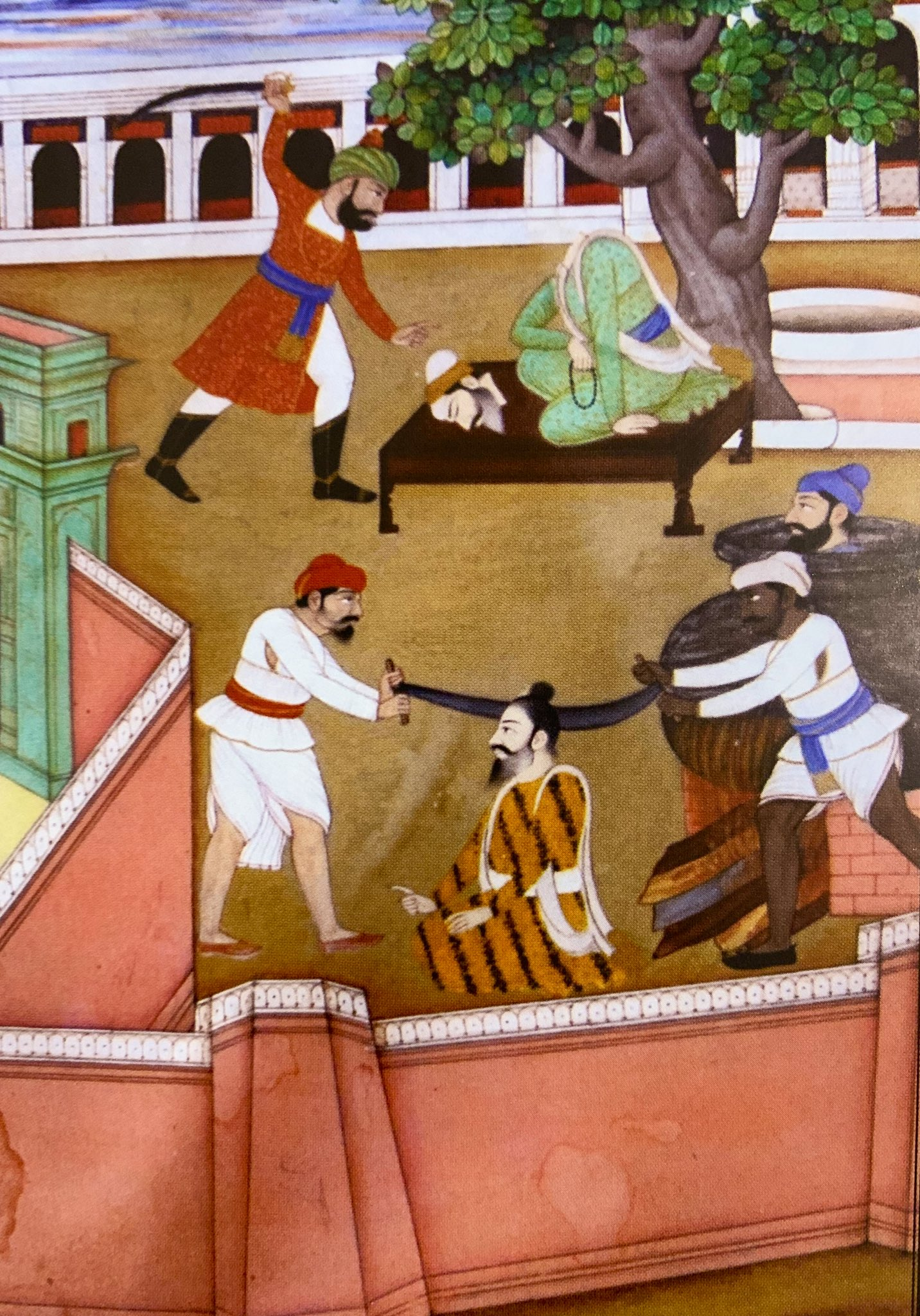
Detail of Basahatullah's 19th century painting of the execution of Guru Tegh Bahadur (beheaded), Bhai Mati Das (sawed in two), and Bhai Dayala Das (boiling in cauldron).

Early the next morning Guru Tegh Bahadur was beheaded by an executioner named Jalal-ud-din Jallad, who resided in the town of Samana in present-day Punjab. The spot of the execution was under a banyan tree (the trunk of the tree and well near-by where he took a bath are still preserved), opposite the Sunheri Masjid near the Kotwali in Chandni Chowk, where he was lodged as a prisoner, on November 11, 1675.

His head was carried by Bhai Jaita, a disciple of the Guru, to Anandpur, where the nine-year-old Guru Gobind Singh cremated it (The gurdwara at this spot is also called Gurdwara Sis Ganj Sahib). The body, before it could be quartered, was stolen under the cover of darkness by Lakhi Shah Vanjara, another disciple, who carried it in a cart of hay and cremated it by burning his hut. The Gurdwara Rakab Ganj Sahib stands today at this location. Later on, the Gurdwara Sis Ganj Sahib, was built at Chandni Chowk at the site of Guru's martyrdom.

== Legacy ==
Bhai Mati Das is regarded as a great martyr by the Sikh. The date of his martyrdom, is celebrated in certain parts of India as a public holiday.^{[37][38][39]} Bhai Mati Das' martyrdom finds explicit mention in the daily supplication prayers of Ardas.

The Bhai Mati Das Sati Das Museum was built in honor of Bhai Mati Das and Bhai Sati Das in Delhi opposite Gurudwara Sis Ganj Sahib, Chandni Chowk the spot where they were martyred.

== See also ==
- Guru Tegh Bahadur
- Bhai Dyal Das
- Bhai Sati Das
- Guru Gobind Singh
- Chhibber

== Sources ==
- Gandhi, Surjit (2007). History of Sikh Gurus Retold: 1606-1708 C.E. Atlantic Publishers. ISBN 9788126908585.
- Singh, Gurpreet (2005). Soul of Sikhism. Delhi: Fusion Books. ISBN 9788128800856.
- Singh, Harbans (1998). The Encyclopaedia of Sikhism: S-Z. Patiala: Publications Bureau. ISBN 9788173805301.
  - Singh, H. S. (2005). The Encyclopedia of Sikhism (Second ed.). New Delhi: Hemkunt Press. ISBN 8170103010.
- Singh, Harjinder (2011). Game of Love (Second ed.). Walsall: Akaal Publishers. ISBN 9780955458712.
- Singh, Iqbal (2014). Sikh Faith - An Epitome of Inter-Faith for Divine Realisation (Second ed.). Sant Attar Singh Hari Sadhu Ashram: Kalgidhar Trust. p. 384.
- Singh, Patwant (2007). The Sikhs. Crown Publishing G. ISBN 9780307429339.
- Bhai Mati Das Ji, searchsikhism.com; accessed 12 November 2016.
- Kartar Singh, Sikh History Book 5, Hemkunt Press, New Delhi, India
