= Bhai Sati Das =

Indian Sikh martyr

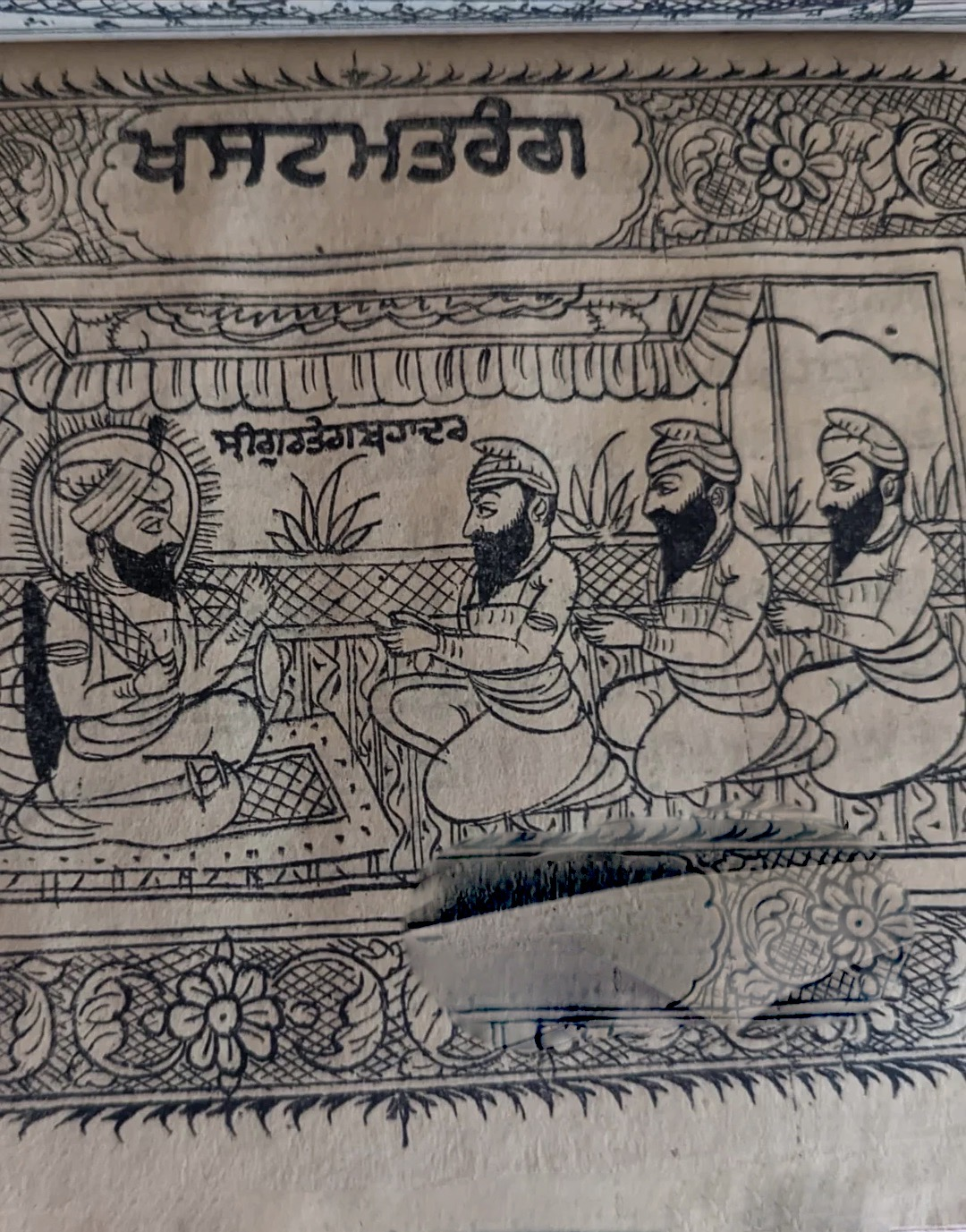
- Illustration depicting Guru Tegh Bahadur and Bhai Mati Das, Bhai Sati Das, and Bhai Dayala, from a Vichar Sagar Steek lithograph, 1881

Personal life
- Born: Karyala, Jhelum District, Lahore Subah, Mughal Empire (present day Pakistan)
- Died: 11 November 1675 Chandni Chowk, Delhi, Delhi Subah, Mughal Empire (present day India)
- Cause of death: Death by burning
- Parent: Bhai Hira Nand (father)

Religious life
- Religion: Sikhism

Bhai Sati Das (Punjabi: ਭਾਈ ਸਤੀ ਦਾਸ; died 11 November 1675) along with his elder brother Bhai Mati Das were martyrs of early Sikh history. Bhai Sati Das, Bhai Mati Das and Bhai Dyal Das were all executed at kotwali (police-station) in the Chandni Chowk area of Delhi, under the express orders of emperor Aurangzeb just prior to the martyrdom of Guru Tegh Bahadur. Bhai Sati Das was executed by the means of being wrapped in cotton wool soaked in oil and set on fire.

== Biography ==
=== Birth ===
Bhai Sati Das born to family of Saraswat Mohyal Brahmin Of Chhibber Clan. He belonged to the ancient village of Karyala, about ten kilometres from Chakwal on the road to the Katas Raj Temple Complex, in the Jhelum District in Punjab (Pakistan). Bhai Mati Das was his older brother and Bhai Sati Das was the son of Hira Nand, a disciple of Guru Har Gobind, under whom he had fought in many battles. Hira Nand was the grandson of Lakhi Das, the son of the Bhai Praga.

=== Service of Guru Tegh Bahadur ===
During the time after Guru Har Krishan's death at Delhi and the uncertainty of the next Guru, the Bhai Mati Das and Bhai Sati Das sometimes find mention in being present looking for the Guru or directly after when Baba Makhan Shah Labana found Guru Tegh Bahadur at the village of Bakala where the new Guru was then residing.

The Guru entrusted financial activity to Bhai Mati Das thus he is sometimes given the name Diwan Mati Das whereas, according to Bhatt Vahi Talauda, Bhai Sati Das served Guru Tegh Bahadur as a cook for the Guru. The two brothers accompanied Guru Teg Bahadur during his 2-year stay at Assam. Guru Tegh Bahadur bought a hillock near the village of Makhowal five miles north of Kiratpur and established a new town, Chakk Nanaki now named as Anandpur Sahib (the abode of bliss) where Mati Das and Sati Das were also present. Bhai Sati Das was known to have a great understanding of the Persian language and according to some sources taught the language to the young Gobind Rai (Guru Gobind Singh).

==== The Guru's eastern tours ====
Bhai Sati Das and Bhai Mati Das were present in the Guru's eastern tours starting in August 1665 including the tours of Saifabad and Dhamtan (Bangar) where they were arrested perhaps because of the influence of Dhir Mal, or the Ulemas and orthodox Brahmins. The Guru was sent to Delhi and detained for 1 month. After being freed December 1665 he continued his tour and Bhai Mati Das and Bhai Sati Das were again in his company particularly at Dacca, and Malda.

=== Guru's Arrest ===
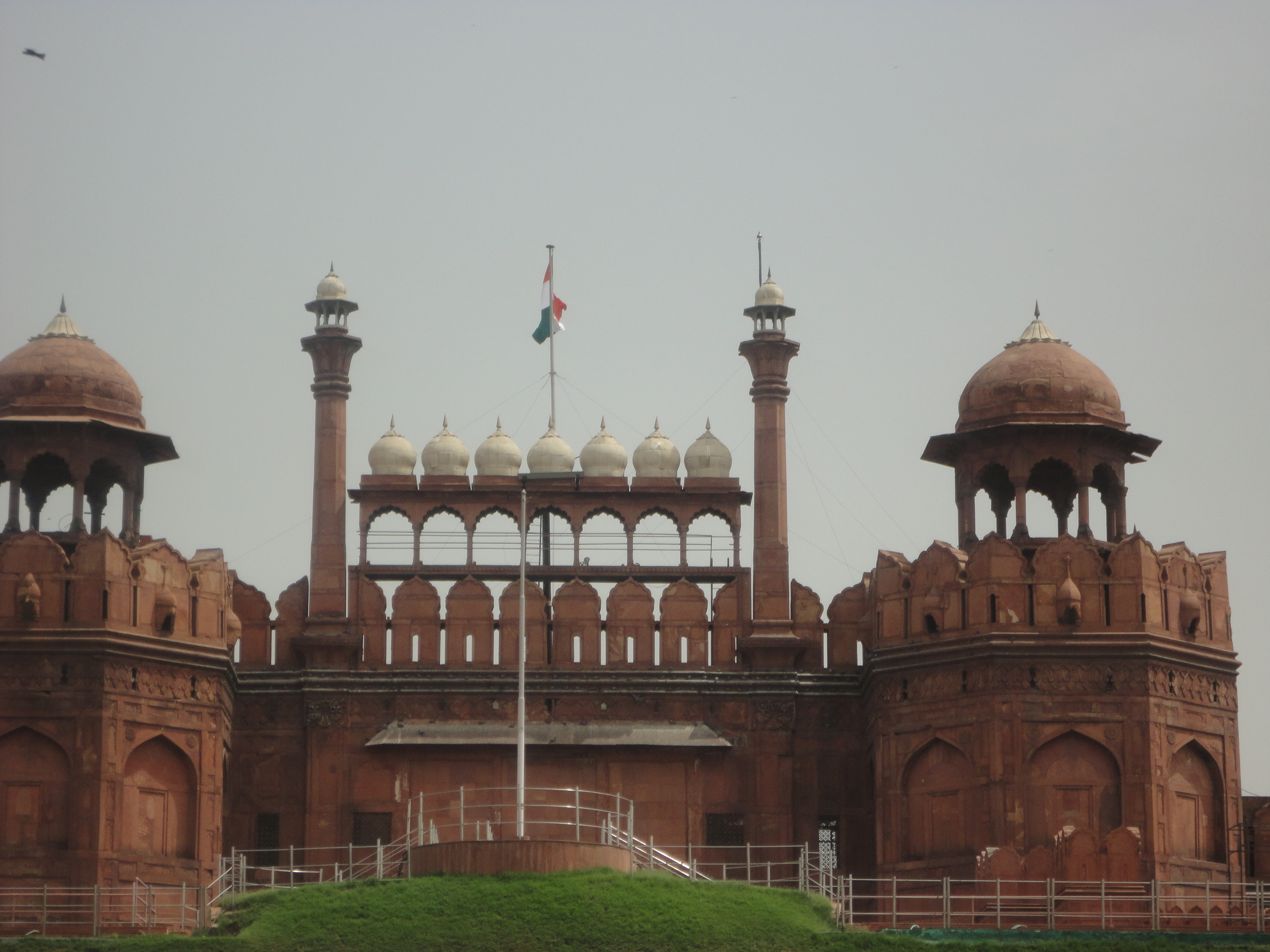
Red Fort at Chandni Chowk Delhi

In 1675 the Guru was summoned by Emperor Aurangzeb to Delhi to convert to Islam. Aurangzeb was very happy that all he had to do was covert one man and the rest of the Brahmins from Kashmir, Kurukshetra, Hardwar, and Beneras would follow suit. The Guru left for Delhi on his own accord but was arrested at Malikpur Rangharan near Ropar. While the Guru was traveling towards Delhi his company at this time consisted of his most devoted Sikhs and comprised Bhai Dayala, Bhai Udai, and Bhai Jaita (Rangretta) as well as Bhai Mati Das and Bhai Sati Das. After visiting a few places where large crowds of devotees visited the Guru sent Bhai Jaita and Bhai Udai to go to Delhi so they can access the information and report it back to him and report it to Anandpur as well. After being arrested Guru Tegh Bahadur was taken to Sirhind from which he was sent to Delhi in an iron cage. At Delhi, the Guru and his five companions were taken into the council chamber of the Red Fort. The Guru was asked numerous questions on religion, Hinduism, Sikhism and Islam, such as why he was sacrificing his life for people that wear Janeu and Tilak when he himself was a Sikh upon which the Guru answered that the Hindus were powerless and weak against tyranny, they had come to the abode of Guru Nanak as refuge, and that with the same logic he would have sacrificed his life for Muslims as well. On the Guru's emphatic refusal to abjure his faith, he was asked why he was called Teg Bahadur (gladiator or Knight of the Sword; before this, his name had been Tyag Mal). Bhai Mati Das immediately replied that the Guru had won the title by inflicting a heavy blow on the imperial forces at the young age of fourteen. Guru Tegh Bahadur was reprimanded for his breach of etiquette and outspokenness and the Guru and his companions were ordered to be imprisoned and tortured until they agreed to embrace Islam.

=== Guru's Martyrdom ===
On November 11, 1675 large crowds gathered to see the Guru and the executioners were called to the kotwali (police-station) near the Sunehri Masjid in the Chandni Chowk and the Guru who was kept in an iron cage and all the three of his companions were moved to the place of the execution. Mati Das, Dyal Das and Sati Das were then tortured and executed.

==== Martyrdom of Bhai Mati Das and Bhai Dyal Das ====
Bhai Mati Das who was the first to be martyred was made to stand erect between two posts and double headed saw was placed on his head and moved across from head to the loins. Seeing this Dyal Das abused the Emperor and his courtiers for this infernal act. He was tied up like a round bundle and thrown into a huge cauldron of boiling oil. He was roasted alive into a block of charcoal. No sign of grief was shown by the disciple of the Guru and the Guru also witnessed all this savagery with divine calm.

==== Martyrdom of Bhai Sati Das ====
After the martyrdom of Bhai Mati Das and Bhai Dyal Das, Bhai Sati Das moved towards the Guru with folded hands and asked for his blessings, saying that he was happy to achieve martyrdom.

The Guru blessed him telling that they must resign themselves cheerfully to the will of the Lord. He praised him for his lifelong single-minded devotion to him and his cause. With tears in his eyes, he bade him farewell saying his sacrifice would occupy an abiding place in history. Sati Das touched the Guru's feet, and came to his place.

Bhai Sati Das was tied to a pole and wrapped in cotton fibre. He was then set on fire by the executioner. He remained calm and peaceful and kept uttering Waheguru Gurmantar, while fire consumed his body.

==== Martyrdom of Guru Tegh Bahadur ====
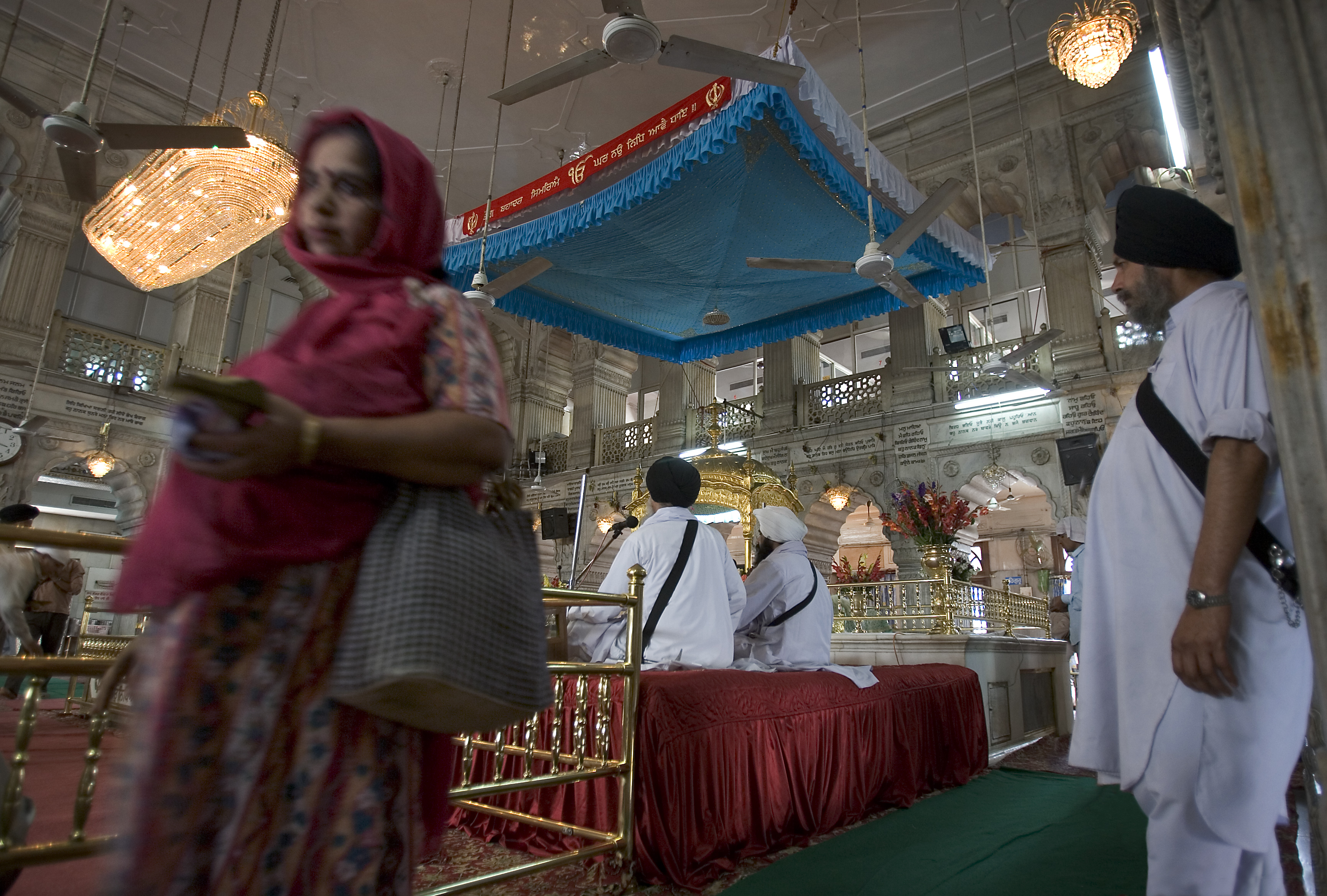
Gurdwara Sis Ganj Sahib, Delhi

Early next morning Guru Tegh Bahadur was beheaded by an executioner called Jalal-ud-din Jallad, who belonged to the town of Samana in present-day Punjab. The spot of the execution was under a banyan tree (the trunk of the tree and well near-by where he took a bath are still preserved), opposite the Sunheri Masjid near the Kotwali in Chandni Chowk, where he was lodged as a prisoner, on November 11, 1675.

His head was carried by Bhai Jaita, a disciple of the Guru, to Anandpur, where the nine-year-old Guru Gobind Singh cremated it(The gurdwara at this spot is also called Gurdwara Sis Ganj Sahib). The body, before it could be quartered, was stolen under the cover of darkness by Lakhi Shah Vanjara, another disciple who carried it in a cart of hay and cremated it by burning his hut, at this spot, the Gurdwara Rakab Ganj Sahib stands today. Later on, the Gurdwara Sis Ganj Sahib, was built at Chandni Chowk at the site of Guru's martyrdom.

== Legacy ==
The Bhai Mati Das Sati Das Museum was built in honor of Bhai Mati Das and Bhai Sati Das in Delhi opposite of Gurudwara Sis Ganj Sahib, Chandni Chowk the spot where they were martyred.

== See also ==
- Guru Tegh Bahadur
- Guru Gobind Singh
- Bhai Mati Das
- Bhai Dayala
