= Shaheedi Diwas of Guru Tegh Bahadur =

Sikh observation (24 November)

Shaheedi Diwas is the death anniversary of the ninth Sikh Guru Tegh Bahadur in 1674, who was executed by the Mughal emperor Aurangzeb. It is observed on the 24 November annually. Being recognized by the Government of India, this day of the year is a public holiday in certain Indian states and territories. Guru Tegh Bahadur is remembered for giving up his life to protect the freedom of the oppressed to practice their own religion. Practices held during the observation are Nagar Kirtans, Akhand Paths, and decorating gurdwaras with lights. 2025 marked the 350th anniversary.

== See also ==
- Martyrs' Day (India)
