= Wall of Truth =

Sikh Genocide 1984 Memorial

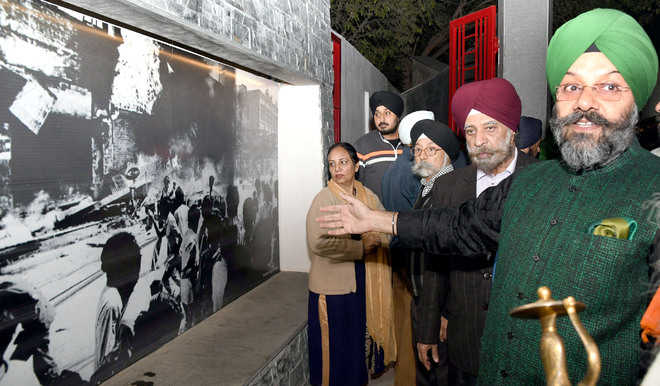
- The memorial of 1984 Sikh massacre at Gurdwara Rakab Ganj Sahib premises "Wall of Truth" was dedicated to humanity after three and a half years of hard work and a cost of Rs 2.25 crore. The memorial of 1984 Sikh massacre at Gurdwara Rakab Ganj Sahib premises
- Interactive map of Wall of Truth
- Location: Gurdwara Rakab Ganj Sahib complex, New Delhi
- Coordinates: 28.61985°N 77.20522°E
- Beginning date: 2014
- Completion date: 2017
- Dedicated date: Sunday, 15 January 2017
- Inauguration date: Sunday, 15 January 2017 By Manjit Singh GK
- Dedicated to: The cause of mankind in the memory of victims by their families

The Wall of Truth (Sacca dī kandha), is a memorial in New Delhi, India, for Sikhs killed during the 1984 anti-Sikh riots. The memorial is located in Lutyens' Delhi at the Gurdwara Rakab Ganj Sahib complex near the Parliament of India. The foundation stone was laid in June 2013, the construction work began in November 2014 and the memorial was inaugurated on 15 January 2017. The monument complex is also known as the 'Sikh Genocide Memorial'. It has been built under the Delhi Sikh Gurudwara Management Committee.

After a long wait, The memorial of 1984 Sikh massacre at Gurdwara Rakab Ganj Sahib premises "Wall of Truth" was dedicated to humanity after three and a half years of hard work and a cost of Rs 2.25 crore. While there were three memorials of Indira Gandhi in Delhi before this, there was no memorial of the Sikhs killed in the massacre. 88 accused were sentenced to 3 to 5 years for the Trilokpuri riots that killed Sikhs.

The names include Sikh soldiers killed during the riots, and the names of three people from the Hindu and Muslim community who had been killed for shielding Sikhs during the riots. The riots had been triggered by assassination of Prime Minister Indira Gandhi. The Wall of Truth also lists the names of Sikhs killed in hate crimes abroad, including at the Oak Creek Gurdwara outside Milwaukee, Wisconsin, in the United States, as well as in Sikhs killed in Afghanistan. It also includes the names of Sikhs killed in incidents such as the Chittisinghpura massacre.
