= Guru Tegh Bahadur =

Ninth Sikh guru from 1664 to 1675

- ਗੁਰੂ ਤੇਗ਼ ਬਹਾਦਰ
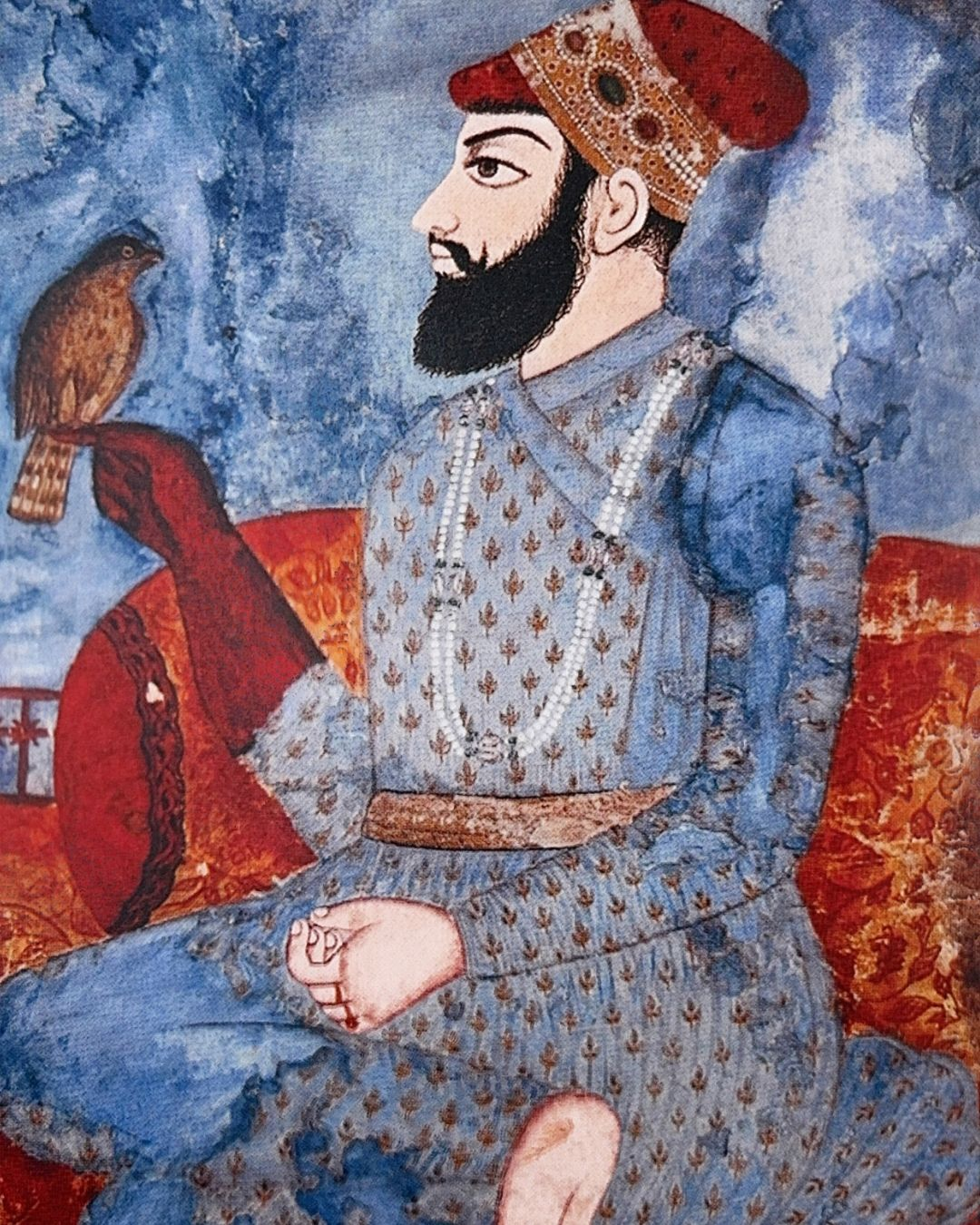
- A portrait of Guru Tegh Bahadur painted by Ahsan, the viceregal painter of Shaista Khan, governor of Bengal, c. 1668–69

Personal life
- Born: Tyag Mal; 1 April 1621 Amritsar, Lahore Subah, Mughal Empire (present-day Punjab, India)
- Died: 11 November 1675 (aged 54) Delhi, Mughal Empire (present-day India)
- Cause of death: Execution by decapitation
- Spouse: Mata Gujri
- Children: Guru Gobind Singh
- Parent(s): Guru Hargobind and Mata Nanaki
- Known for: Hymns to Guru Granth Sahib; Executed under the reign of Mughal Emperor Aurangzeb.; Founder of Anandpur Sahib
- Other names: Ninth Master; Ninth Nanak; Srisht-di-Chadar ("Shield of The World"); Dharam-di-Chadar ("Shield of Dharma"); Hind-di-Chadar ("Shield of India"); Jagg-dī-cādar
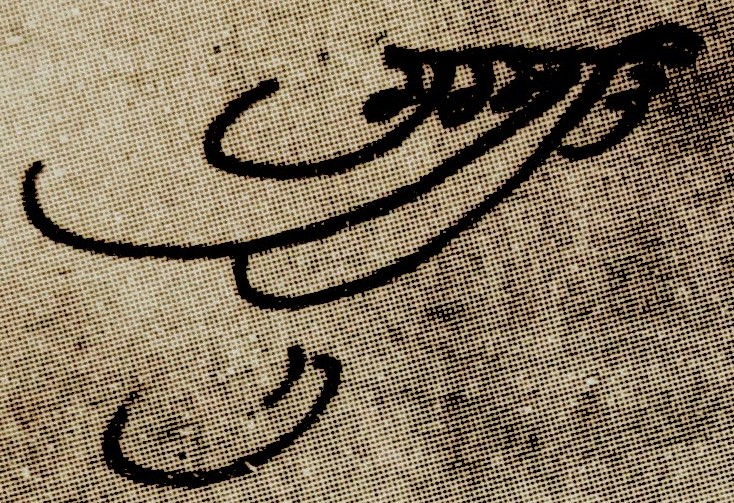
- Signature

Religious life
- Religion: Sikhism

Religious career
- Based in: Anandpur Sahib (1664–1675)
- Period in office: 1664–1675
- Predecessor: Guru Har Krishan
- Successor: Guru Gobind Singh

Military service
- Battles/wars: Early Mughal-Sikh Wars; Battle of Kartarpur (1635) Skirmish Of Dhubri (1669)

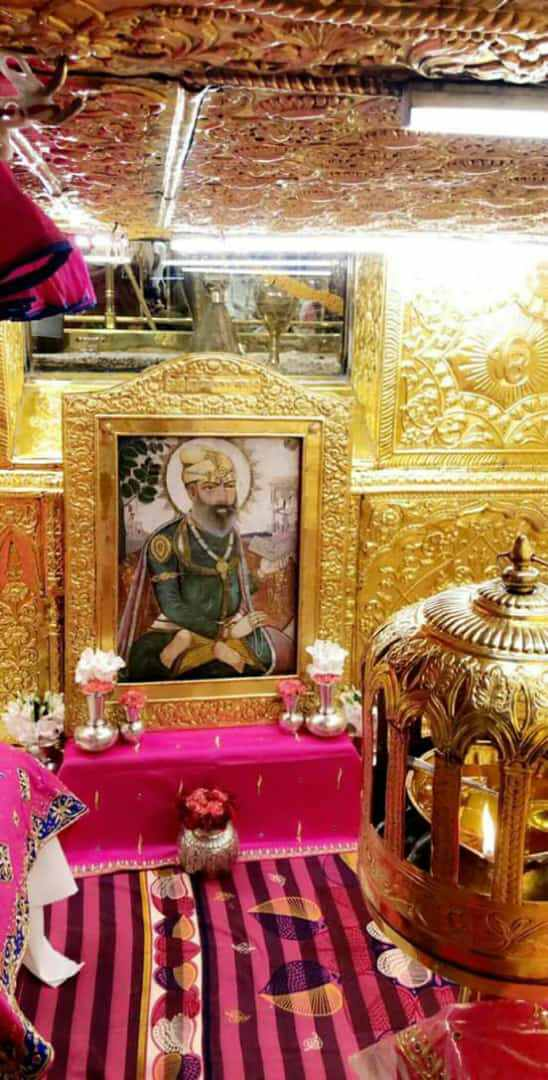
Interior view of Gurdwara Sis Ganj Sahib

Guru Tegh Bahadur (Punjabi: ਗੁਰੂ ਤੇਗ਼ ਬਹਾਦਰ (Gurmukhi); Punjabi pronunciation: [gʊɾuː t̯eːɣ bəɦaːd̯ʊɾᵊ], Teġ Bahādur; 1 April 1621 – 11 November 1675) was the ninth of ten gurus who founded the Sikh religion and was the leader of Sikhs from 1664 until his beheading in 1675. He was born in Amritsar, Punjab, India in 1621 and was the youngest son of Guru Hargobind, the sixth Sikh guru. Considered a principled and fearless warrior, he was a learned spiritual scholar and a poet whose 115 hymns are included in the Guru Granth Sahib, which is the main text of Sikhism. He was the founder of Anandpur Sahib in 1664.

Guru Tegh Bahadur was executed on the orders of Aurangzeb, the sixth Mughal emperor, in Delhi, India. Sikh holy premises Gurudwara Sis Ganj Sahib and Gurdwara Rakab Ganj Sahib in Delhi mark the places of execution and cremation of Guru Tegh Bahadur. His day of martyrdom (Shaheedi Divas) is commemorated in India every year on 24 November.

Historical sources differ on the reasons for the conflict between Guru Tegh Bahadur and Aurangzeb, and the subsequent execution of the Guru. Sikh accounts state that the Guru defended the freedom and rights of non-Muslims against the intolerant policies of Aurangzeb, while Mughal ones state that the Guru was forcibly collecting taxes from non-Muslims in the Punjab region. In addition, members of the Guru's family who were pretenders to the position of the guruship played a role in instigating Aurangzeb's hostility to the Guru.

== Biography ==
=== Early life ===
Guru Tegh Bahadur was born Tyag Mal (Tīāg Mal) (Punjabi: ਤਿਆਗ ਮਲ) in Amritsar on 1 April 1621. He was the youngest son of Guru Hargobind, the sixth guru. His family belonged to the Sodhi clan of Khatris. Hargobind had one daughter, Bibi Viro, and five sons: Baba Gurditta, Suraj Mal, Ani Rai, Atal Rai, and Tyag Mal. He gave Tyag Mal the name Tegh Bahadur (“brave [user] of sword”) after Tyag Mal showed valor in the Battle of Kartarpur against the Mughals.

Tegh Bahadur was brought up in the Sikh culture and trained in archery and horsemanship. He was also taught the old classics such as the Vedas, the Upanishads, and the Puranas. He was married on 3 February 1632 to Gujri.

In the 1640s, nearing his death, Guru Hargobind and his wife Nanaki moved to his ancestral village of Bakala in Amritsar district, together with Tegh Bahadur and Gujri. After Hargobind's death, Tegh Bahadur continued to live in Bakala with his wife and mother.

According to Guru Kian Sakhian, Tegh Bahadur left Bakala on pilgrimage in 1656 and was staying alongside his family in Patna at the time of Guru Har Rai's passing away. Being away from Punjab he could not get the news in time, returning in 1664.

=== Installation as Guru of Sikhs ===
In March 1664, Guru Har Krishan contracted smallpox. When his followers asked who would lead them after him, he said, "Baba Bakala", meaning his successor was to be found in Bakala. Taking advantage of the ambiguity in the words of the dying guru, many installed themselves in Bakala, claiming to be the new guru. Sikhs were puzzled to see so many claimants.

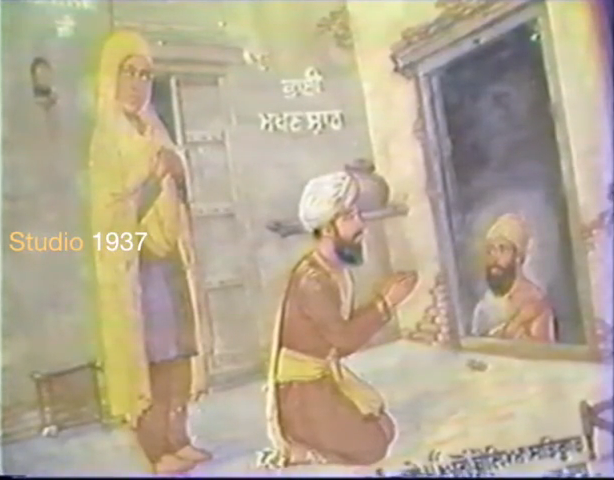
Fresco depicting Bhai Makhan Shah Labana finding Guru Tegh Bahadur, with Mata Nanaki, from Gurdwara Baba Bakala

Sikh tradition has a legend about how Tegh Bahadur was selected as the ninth guru. A wealthy trader named Makhan Shah Labana had vowed to give 500 gold coins to the Sikh Guru upon escaping a shipwreck some time ago, and he came to Bakala in search of the ninth guru. He met each claimant he could find, making his obeisance and offering them two gold coins in the belief that the right guru would know of his silent promise to give them 500 coins. Every "guru" he met accepted the two gold coins and bid him farewell. Then he discovered that Tegh Bahadur also lived at Bakala. Makhan Shah gave Tegh Bahadur the usual offering of two gold coins. Tegh Bahadur blessed him and remarked that his offering was short of the promised five hundred. Makhan Shah made good the difference and ran upstairs. He began shouting from the rooftop, "Guru ladho re, Guru ladho re", meaning "I have found the Guru, I have found the Guru".

In August 1664, a Sikh congregation led by Diwan Dargha Mal, son of a well-known devotee of Har Krishan, arrived in Bakala and appointed Tegh Bahadur as the ninth guru of Sikhs.

As had been the custom among Sikhs after the execution of Guru Arjan by Mughal Emperor Jahangir, Guru Tegh Bahadur was surrounded by armed bodyguards, but he otherwise lived an austere life.

=== Journeys ===
Guru Tegh Bahadur traveled extensively in different parts of the Indian subcontinent, including Dhaka and Assam, to preach the teachings of Guru Nanak, the first Sikh guru. The places he visited and stayed in became sites of Sikh temples. During his travels, he started a number of community water wells and langars (community kitchens for the poor).

Tegh Bahadur visited the towns of Mathura, Agra, Allahabad and Varanasi. His son, Guru Gobind Singh, who would be the tenth Sikh guru, was born in Patna in 1666 while he was away in Dhubri, Assam, where the Gurdwara Sri Guru Tegh Bahadur Sahib now stands. While in Assam, it is claimed by Sikh accounts that the guru brokered peace between Raja Ram Singh and the Ahom ruler Raja Chakradhwaj Singha (Supangmung).

After his visit to Assam, Bengal, and Bihar, Guru Tegh Bahadur visited Rani Champa of Bilaspur, who offered to give the Guru a piece of land in her state. The Guru bought the site for 500 rupees. There, he founded the city of Anandpur Sahib in the foothills of the Himalayas. In 1672, Tegh Bahadur traveled in and around the Malwa region to meet the masses as the persecution of non-Muslims reached new heights.

== Execution ==
=== Narrative ===
Many scholars identify the traditional Sikh narrative as follows: A congregation of Hindu Pandits from Kashmir requested help against Aurangzeb's persecutions and oppressive policies, and Guru Tegh Bahadur decided to protect their rights. According to Trilochan Singh in Guru Tegh Bahadur: Prophet and Martyr, the convoy of Kashmiri Pandits who tearfully pleaded with the Guru at Anandpur were 500 in number and were led by a certain Pandit Kirpa Ram, who recounted tales of religious oppression under the governorship of Iftikhar Khan. The Kashmiri Pandits decided to meet with the Guru after they first sought the assistance of Shiva at the Amarnath shrine, where one of them is said to have had a dream where Shiva instructed the Pandits to seek out the ninth Sikh guru for assistance in their plight and hence a group was formed for carrying out the task. Guru Tegh Bahadur left from his base at Makhowal to confront the persecution of Kashmiri Pandits by Mughal officials but was arrested at Ropar and put to jail in Sirhind. Four months later, in November 1675, he was transferred to Delhi and asked to perform a miracle to prove his nearness to God or convert to Islam. The Guru declined, and three of his colleagues, who had been arrested with him, were tortured to death in front of him: Bhai Mati Das was sawn in two, Bhai Dayal Das was thrown into a cauldron of boiling liquid, and Bhai Sati Das was cut into pieces. Thereafter on 11 November, Tegh Bahadur was publicly beheaded in Chandni Chowk, a market square close to the Red Fort, on the orders of Aurangzeb.

=== Historiography ===
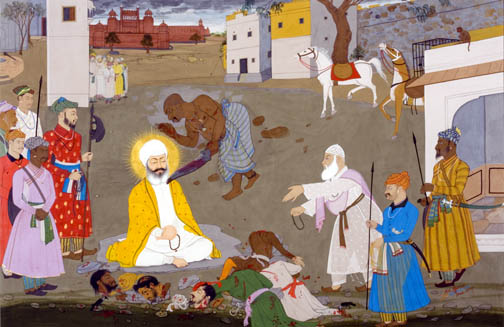
Painting depicting the execution of Guru Tegh Bahadur in Chandni Chowk, Delhi.

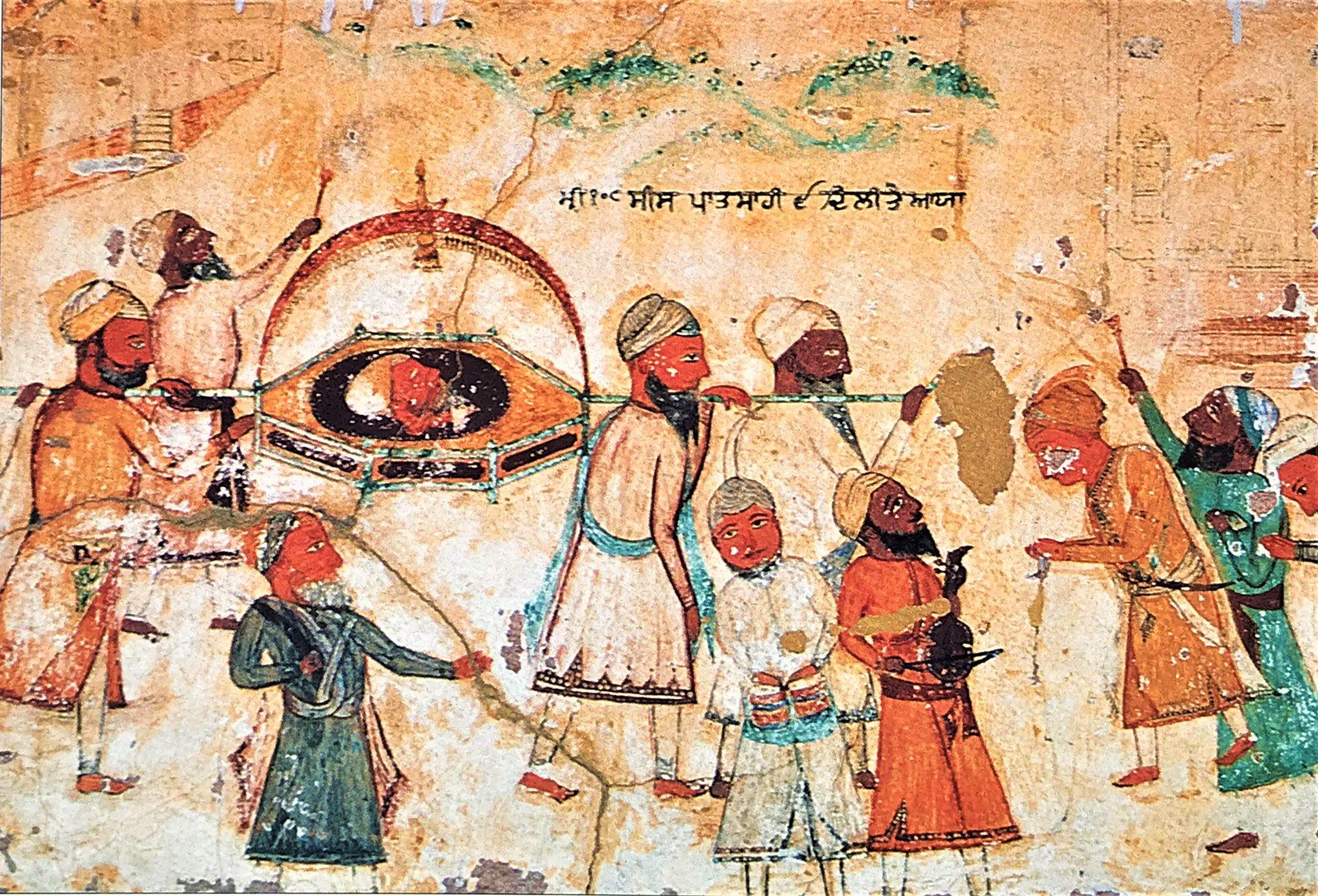
Fresco art depicting head of Guru Tegh Bahadar being brought to Anandpur by Sikhs

The primary nucleus of Sikh narratives remains the Bachittar Natak, a memoir of Guru Gobind Singh, Guru Tegh Bahadur's son, dated between late 1680s and late 1690s. (Note: The authorship is disputed. While W. H. McLeod considered the work to be Guru Gobind Singh's, Gurinder Singh Mann and Purnima Dhavan concluded it to be the work of multiple court poets; there is a rough consensus to date the text.) Guru Tegh Bahadur's son and successor recalled the Guru's execution:

In this dark age, Tegh Bahadur performed a great act of chivalry (saka) for the sake of the frontal mark and sacred thread. He offered all he had for the holy. He gave up his head, but did not utter a sigh. He suffered martyrdom for the sake of religion. He laid down his head, but not his honor. Real men of God do not perform tricks like showmen. Having broken the pitcher on the head of the Emperor of Delhi, he departed to the world of God. No one has ever performed a deed like him. At his departure, the whole world mourned, while the heavens hailed it as a victory.

— Guru Gobind Singh, Bachittar Natak: Apni Katha

More Sikh accounts of Guru Tegh Bahadur's execution, all claiming to be sourced from the "testimony of trustworthy Sikhs", only started emerging in around the late eighteenth century, and are thus, often conflicting, according to historian Satish Chandra.

Persian and Mughal sources maintain that the Guru was a bandit whose plunder and rapine of Punjab along with his rebellious activities precipitated his execution. According to Chandra, the earliest Persian source to chronicle his execution is Siyar-ul-Mutakhkherin by Ghulam Husain Khan c. 1782, where Tegh Bahadur's (alleged) oppression of subjects is held to have incurred Aurangzeb's wrath:

Tegh Bahadur, the eighth successor of (Guru) Nanak became a man of authority with a large number of followers. (In fact) several thousand persons used to accompany him as he moved from place to place. His contemporary Hafiz Adam, a faqir belonging to the group of Shaikh Ahmad Sirhindi's followers, had also come to have a large number of murids and followers. Both these men (Guru Tegh Bahadur and Hafiz Adam) used to move about in Punjab, adopting a habit of coercion and extortion. Tegh Bahadur used to collect money from Hindus and Hafiz Adam from Muslims. The royal waqia navis (news reporter and intelligence agent) wrote to the Emperor Alamgir [Aurangzeb]... of their manner of activity, adding that if their authority increased they could become even refractory.

— Ghulam Husain, Siyar-ul-Mutakhkherin

Chandra cautions against taking Ghulam Husain's argument at face value, as Ghulam Husain was a relative of Alivardi Khan — one of the closest confidantes of Aurangzeb — and might have been providing an "official justification". Also, the Guru's alleged association with Hafiz Adam is anachronistic. Chandra further writes that Ghulam Husain's account places Guru Tegh Bahadur's confinement and execution in Lahore, while Sikh tradition places it in Delhi, and Chandra finds no reason to reject said tradition.

The Sikh sakhis (traditional accounts) written during the eighteenth century indirectly support the narrative in the Persian sources, saying that "the Guru was in violent opposition to the Muslim rulers of the country" in response to the dogmatic policies implemented by Aurangzeb. Both Persian and Sikh sources agree that Guru Tegh Bahadur militarily opposed the Mughal state and was therefore targeted for execution in accordance with Aurangzeb's zeal for punishing enemies of the state.

Bhimsen, a contemporary chronicler of Guru Gobind Singh, wrote (c.1708) that the successors of Guru Nanak maintained extravagant lifestyles, and some of them, including Tegh Bahadur, rebelled against the state: Tegh Bahadur proclaimed himself Padshah and acquired a large following, as a result, Aurangzeb had him executed. Muhammad Qasim's Ibratnama, written in 1723, claimed Tegh Bahadur's religious inclinations along with his life of splendor and conferral of sovereignty by his followers had him condemned and executed.

Chronicler Sohan Lal Suri, the court historian of Ranjit Singh, in his magisterial Umdat ut Tawarikh (c. 1805) chose to reiterate Ghulam Husain Khan's argument at large: he states that the Guru gained thousands of followers of soldiers and horsemen during his travels between 1672 and 1673 in southern Punjab, essentially having a nomadic army, and provided shelter to rebels who were resistant to Mughal representatives. Aurangzeb was warned about such activity as a cause of concern that could possibly lead to insurrection or rebellion and to eliminate the threat of the Guru at the earliest opportunity.

Chandra writes that in contrast to this dominating theme in Sikh literature, some pre-modern Sikh accounts had laid the blame on an acrimonious succession dispute: Ram Rai, elder brother of Guru Har Krishan, was held to have instigated Aurangzeb against Tegh Bahadur by suggesting that he prove his spiritual greatness by performing miracles at the Court. (Note: Ghulam Muhiuddin Bute Shah in his Tarikh- i-Punjab reiterates this narrative.)

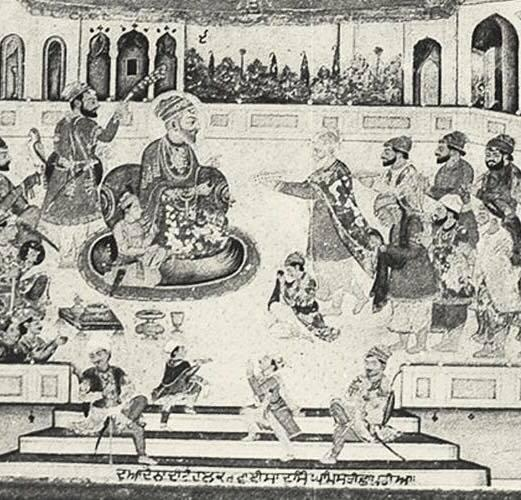
Detail of a mural from Gurdwara Baba Atal Rai depicting Guru Tegh Bahadar and a young Guru Gobind Singh (then known as Gobind Das or Gobind Rai) receiving a delegation of Kashmiri Pandits whom petition their help against religious persecution of Kashmiri Hindus by the Mughal Empire. This fresco has since been lost.

=== Scholarly analysis ===
Satish Chandra expresses doubt about the authenticity of these meta-narratives, centered on miracles — Aurangzeb was not a believer in them, according to Chandra. He further expresses doubt pertaining to the narrative of the persecution of Hindus in Kashmir within Sikh accounts, remarking that no contemporary sources mentioned the persecution of Hindus there.

Louis E. Fenech refuses to pass any judgement, in light of the paucity of primary sources; however, he notes that these Sikh accounts had coded martyrdom into the events, with an aim to elicit pride rather than trauma in readers. He further argues that Tegh Bahadur sacrificed himself for the sake of his own faith, saying that the janju and tilak mentioned in a passage in the Bachittar Natak refer to Tegh Bahadur's own sacred thread and frontal mark.

Barbara Metcalf notes that Tegh Bahadur's familial ties to Dara Shikoh (Aurangzeb summoned both Guru Har Rai and later Guru Har Krishan to his court to account for their rumored support to Shikoh), along with his proselytization and being a military organizer, invoked both political and Islamic justifications for the execution.

== Literature ==
Guru Tegh Bahadur composed 116 hymns in 15 ragas (musical measures), and these were included in the Guru Granth Sahib (pages 219–1427) by his son, Guru Gobind Singh. They cover a wide range of spiritual topics, including human attachments, the body, the mind, sorrow, dignity, service, death, and deliverance.

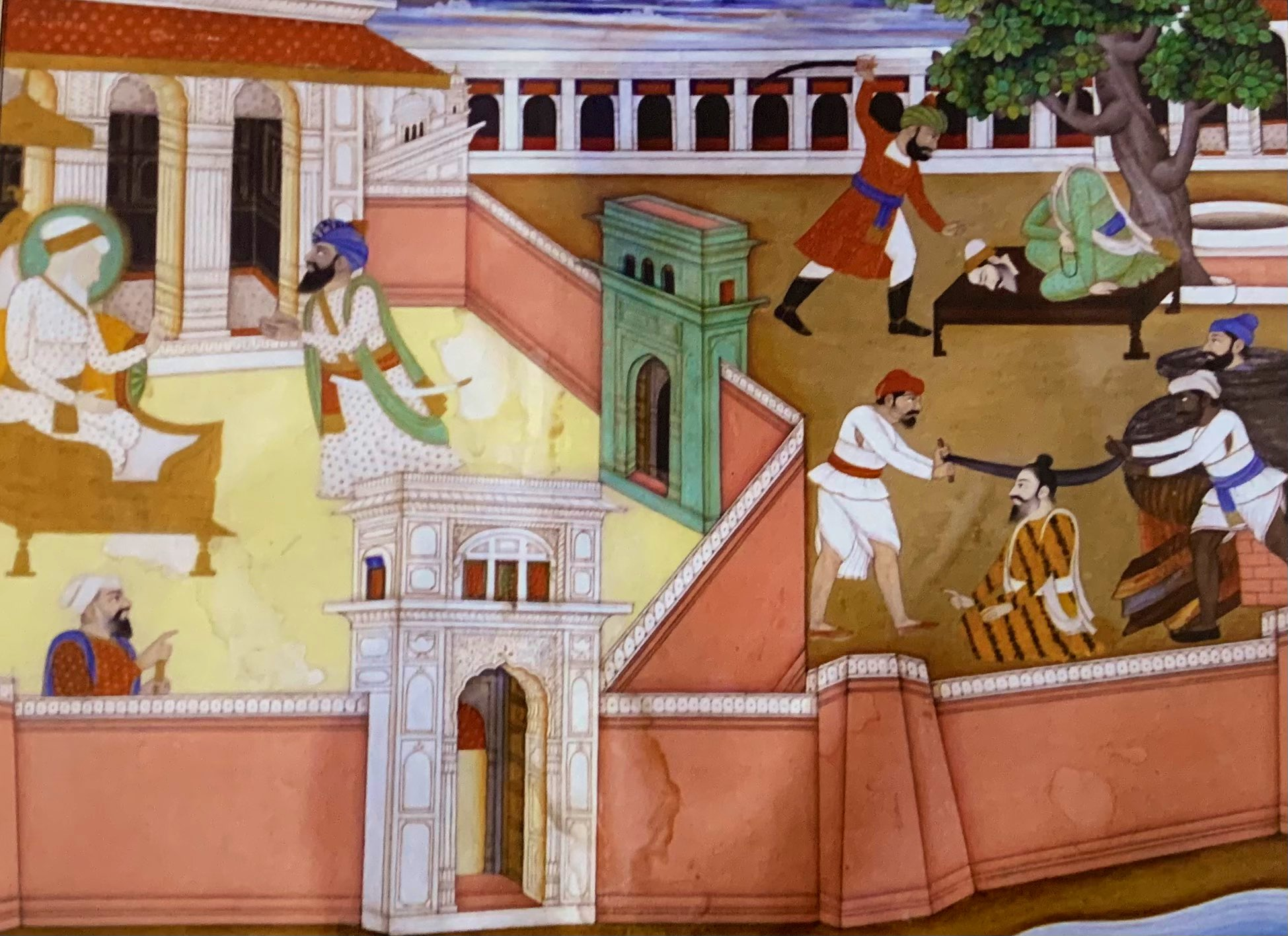
Aurangzeb sitting on his throne, receiving the news of the martyrdom of Guru Tegh Bahadur and the Guru’s companions, Bhai Mati Das and Bhai Dayala Das at Delhi’s Chandni Chowk. Painting by Basahatullah, court painter of the Maharaja of Nabha, circa 19th century.

His hymn, Deh Shiva was used in a 2019 Indian Hindi movie Kesari.

== Legacy and memorials ==
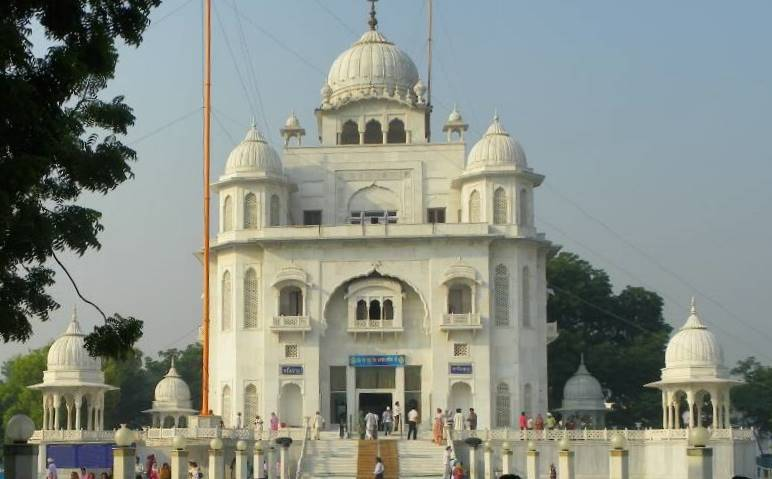
Gurdwara Rakab Ganj Sahib, Delhi

Guru Tegh Bahadur built the city of Anandpur Sahib and was responsible for saving a faction of Kashmiri Pandits, who were being persecuted by the Mughals.

After the execution of Guru Tegh Bahadur by Mughal Emperor Aurangzeb, a number of Sikh gurudwaras were built in his and his associates' memory. The Gurdwara Sis Ganj Sahib in Chandni Chowk, Delhi, was built over where he was beheaded. Gurdwara Rakab Ganj Sahib, also in Delhi, is built where one of Guru Tegh Bahadur's disciples burned his house down to cremate the Guru's body.

Gurdwara Sisganj Sahib in Punjab marks the site where, in November 1675, the head of the martyred Guru Tegh Bahadur was cremated after being brought there by Bhai Jaita (renamed Bhai Jiwan Singh according to Sikh rites) in defiance of the Mughal authority of Aurangzeb.

The execution of Guru Tegh Bahadur hardened the resolve of Sikhs against Muslim rule and persecution. Pashaura Singh states that "if the martyrdom of Guru Arjan had helped bring the Sikh Panth together, Guru Tegh Bahadur's martyrdom helped to make the protection of human rights central to its Sikh identity". Wilfred Smith stated that "the attempt to forcibly convert the ninth Guru to an externalized, impersonal Islam clearly made an indelible impression on the martyr's nine-year-old son, Gobind, who reacted slowly but deliberately by eventually organizing the Sikh group into a distinct, formal, symbol-patterned community". It inaugurated the Khalsa identity.

In one of his poetic works, the classical Punjabi poet Bulleh Shah, referred to Guru Tegh Bahadur as "Ghazi", an honorific title for a warrior. Chandra Sain Sainapati, a court poet of Guru Gobind Singh, described Tegh Bahadur as "Srisht ki Chadar" (protector of humanity). More recent titles given to Tegh Bahadur include Dharam di Chadar (protector of dharma) and Hind di Chadar (protector of India or Hinduism), though Harinder Singh of the Sikh Research Institute argues these titles are reductive.

In India, 24 November is observed as Guru Tegh Bahadur's Martyrdom Day (Shaheedi Diwas). In certain parts of India, this day of the year is a public holiday. Guru Tegh Bahadur is remembered for giving up his life to protect the freedom of the oppressed to practice their own religion.

== Gallery ==
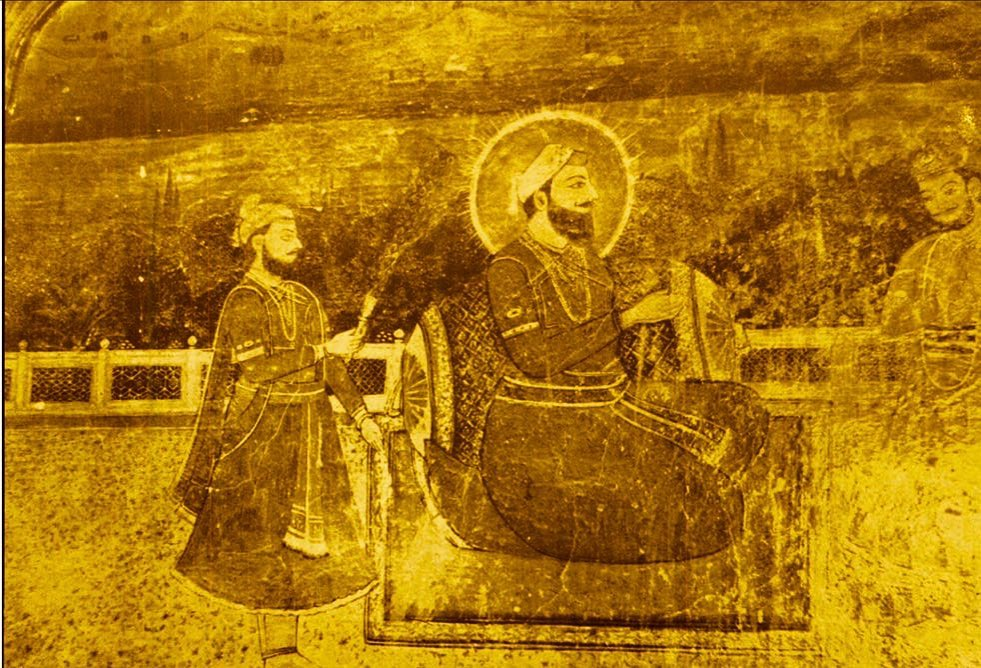
Guru Tegh Bahadur, fresco from Qila Mubarak.

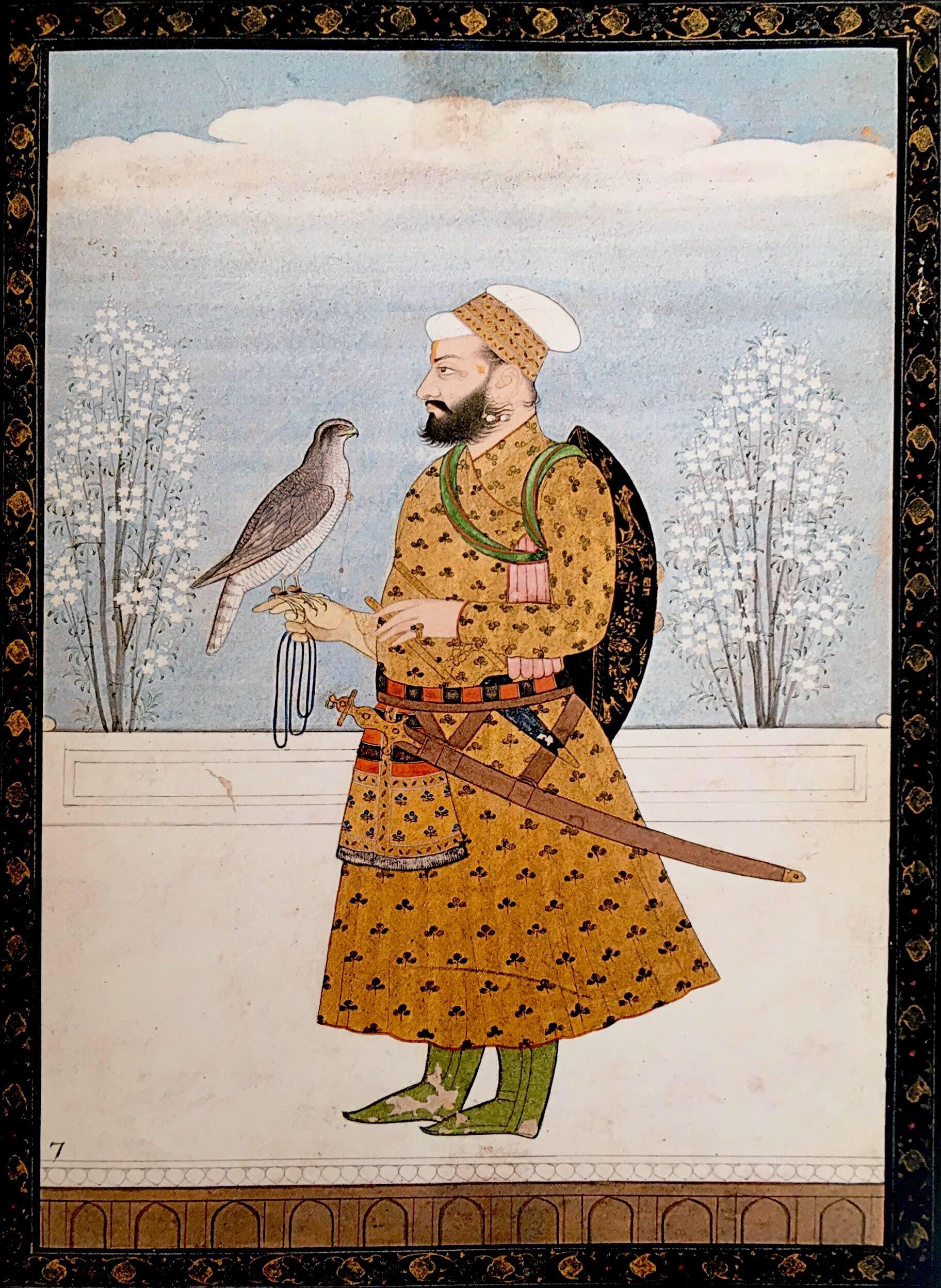
Portrait of Guru Tegh Bahadur in the Pahari style.

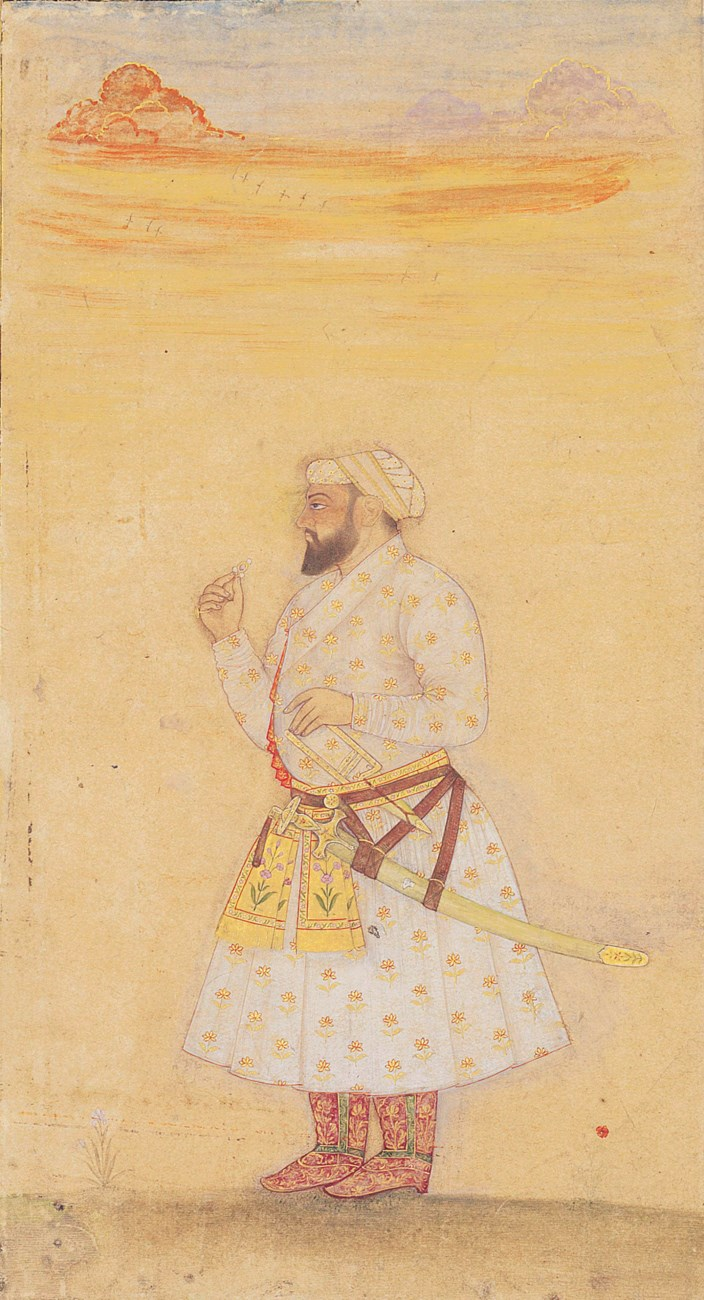
18th century painting of Guru Tegh Bahadur.

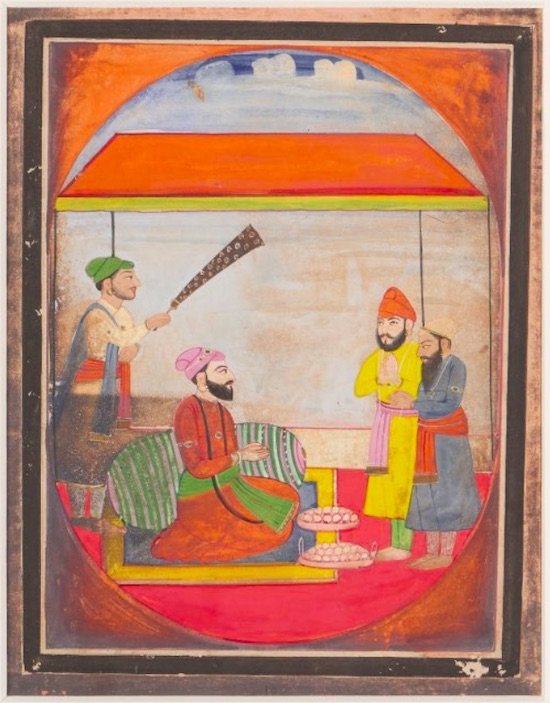
19th century painting depicting Guru Tegh Bahadur.

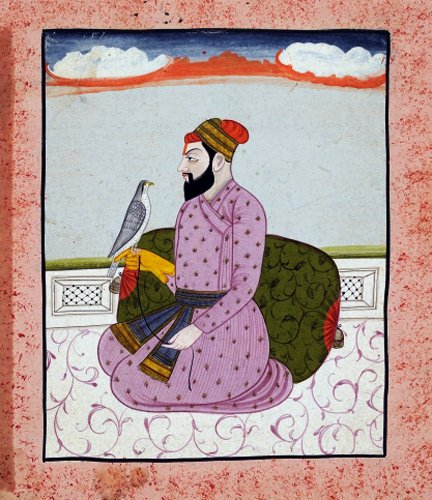
Guru Tegh Bahadur, Pahari painting. Gouache on paper.

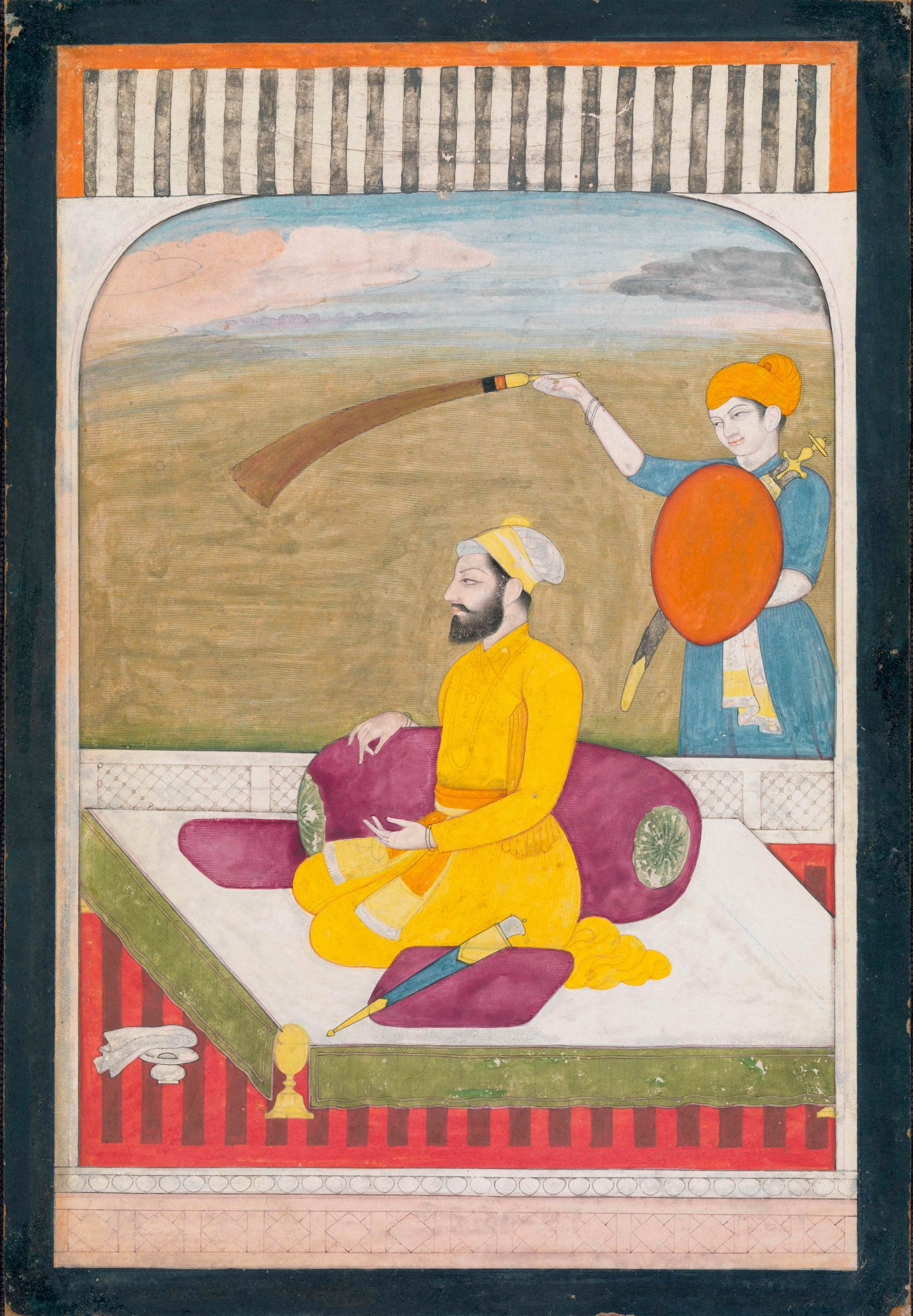
Guru Tegh Bahadur painting from the family workshop of Nainsukh of Guler.

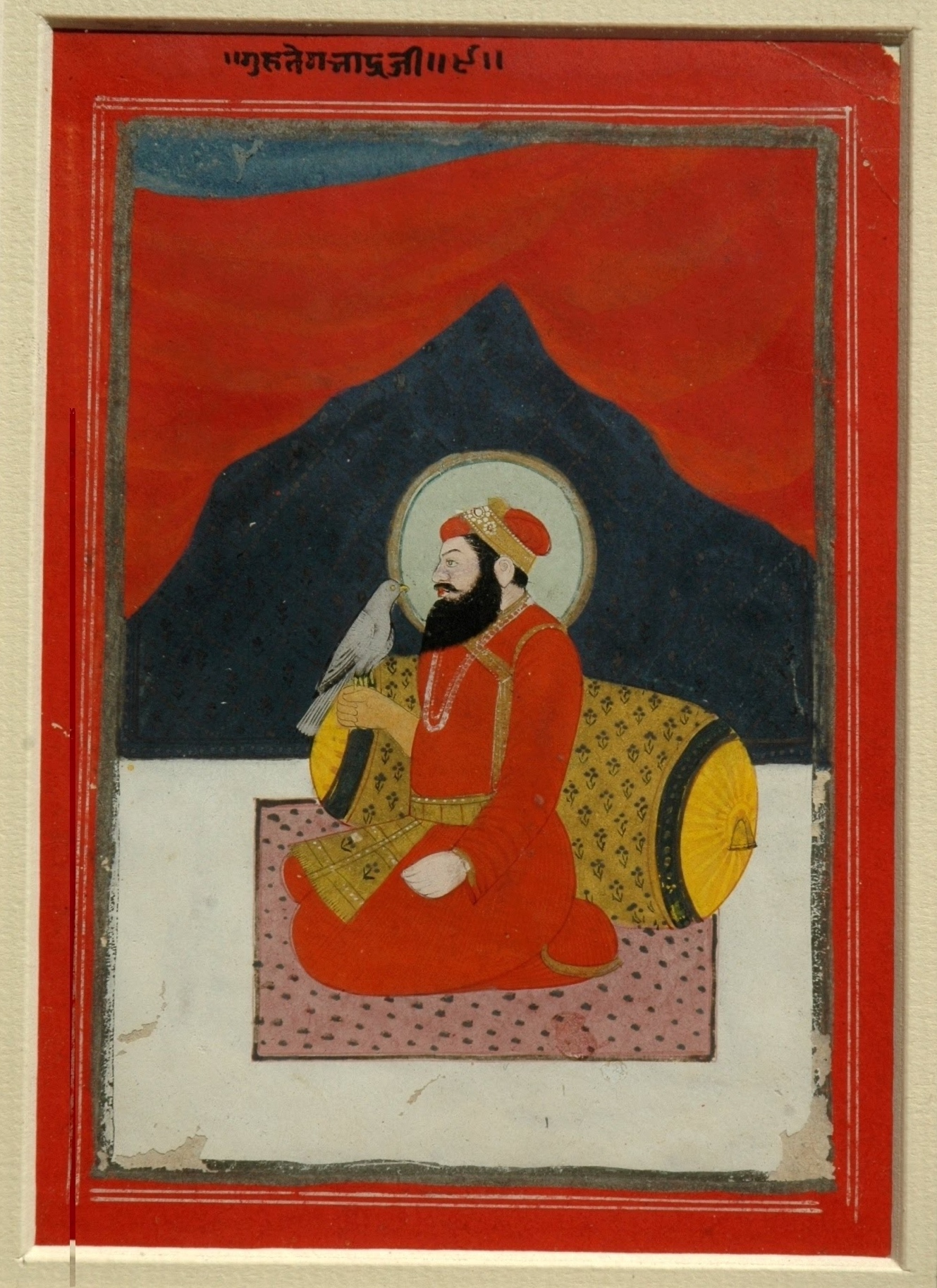
Portrait of Guru Tegh Bahadur from the last quarter of the 19th century.

== Notes ==
Preceded by Guru Har Krishan	Sikh Guru; 30 March 1664 – 11 November 1675	Succeeded by Guru Gobind Singh
