= Chhibber =

Chhibber, alternatively Chibber, is a clan of Mohyal Brahmins from the Punjab region of the Indian subcontinent.

== See also ==
- Chibber, a surname also spelled Chhibber
