= Chibber =

Chibber is a surname. Notable people with the name include:

- Aloo Jal Chibber, Indian politician
- Gauri (Chibber) Khan (born 1970), Indian film producer and designer
- Manohar Lal Chibber (1927–2015), Indian army officer and writer
- Om Prakash Chibber (1919–1998), Indian actor
- Priyanka Chibber, cast member of the Indian soap opera Rang Badalti Odhani
- Puru Chibber (born 1990), Indian actor
- Vibha Chibber, Indian actor
- Vivek Chibber (born 1965), Indian-American sociologist
