= Bhai Dayala =

Sikh martyr (died 1675)

Bhai Dayala Ji
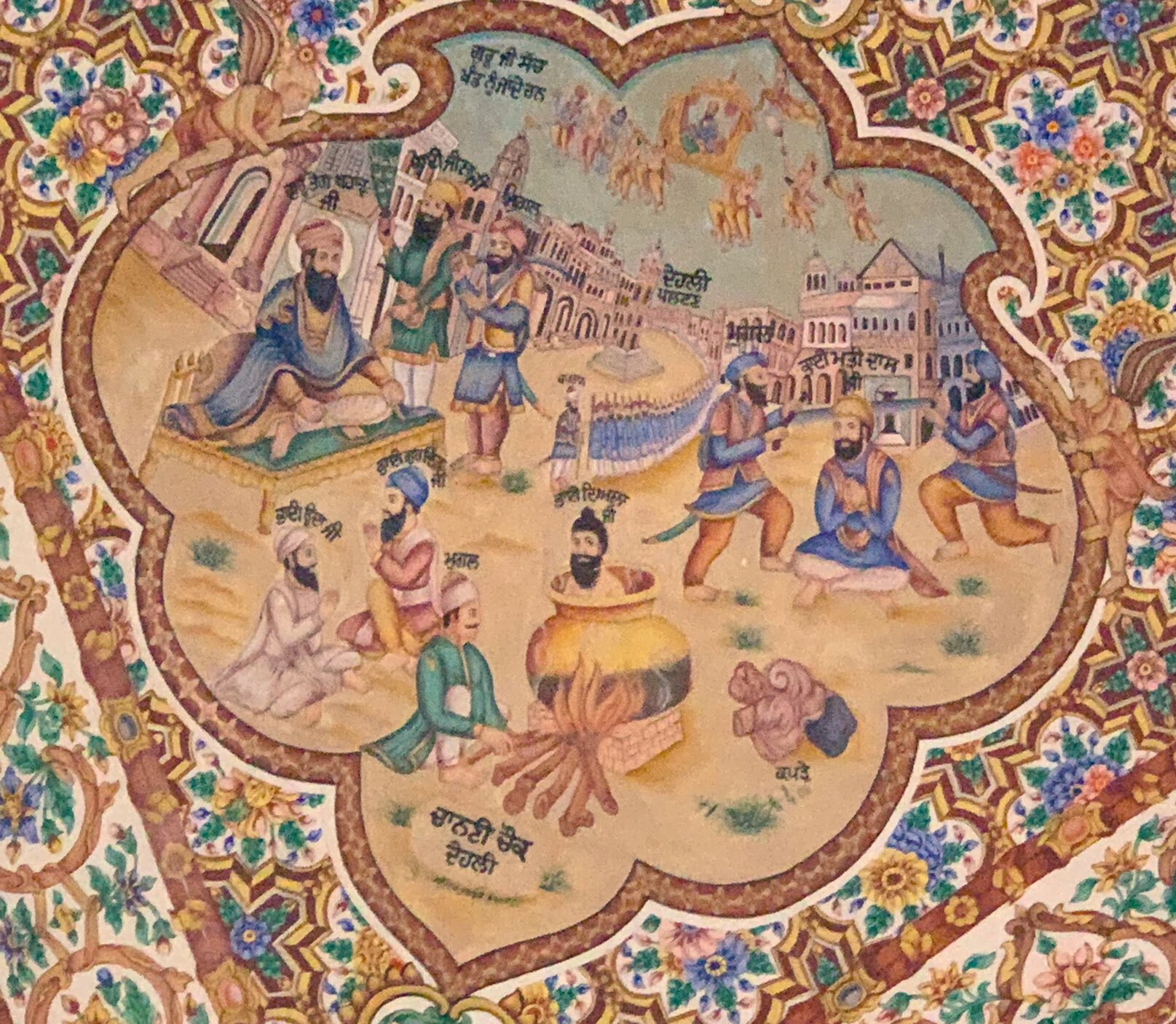
- Fresco depicting the execution of Bhai Dayala and Bhai Mati Das before Guru Tegh Bahadur from Gurdwara Baba Bakala
- Died: 11 November 1675; Chandni Chowk, Delhi, Delhi Subah, Mughal Empire
- Cause of death: Death by boiling
- Known for: Boiling, Being Masand of the Patna Sangat and responsible for Patna Suba.

Bhai Dayala (Gurmukhi: ਭਾਈ ਦਿਆਲਾ ਜੀ), also known as Bhai Dayal Das, was an early martyr of Sikhism. He was boiled alongside his Sikh companions Bhai Mati Das and Bhai Sati Das and the Ninth Guru, Guru Tegh Bahadur.

== Early life ==
Dayal Das was born in a Brahmin family. Bhai Dayala was one of the twenty five or so Sikhs, alongside Mata Sulakhni (Mata Kishan), that accompanied Guru Har Krishan when he left Kiratpur to visit Emperor Aurangzeb in Delhi in 1664.

== Service of Guru Tegh Bahadur ==
Bhai Dayala was one of the Guru's most dearest and closest companions. Bhai Dayala was the chief of the sangat (holy congregation) at Patna Sahib and enlisted incharge of all the masands in the east, and when the Guru's son Gobind Rai (Gobind Singh) was born it was him who sent Guru Tegh Bahadur a letter, who was at Dacca, informing him of his son's birth.

Bhai Dayala helped take care of the Guru's son with the help of Bhai Kirpal and was with the Guru at Lakhnaur where the Guru was with his family and son Gobind Rai when they came from Patna and headed to Baba Bakala around 1672.

When the Guru left Anandpur Sahib on 11 July 1675 where he would head towards Delhi to meet Aurungzeb he was accompanied by Bhai Dayal Das, Bhai Mati Das, and Bhai Sati Das.

== Arrest ==
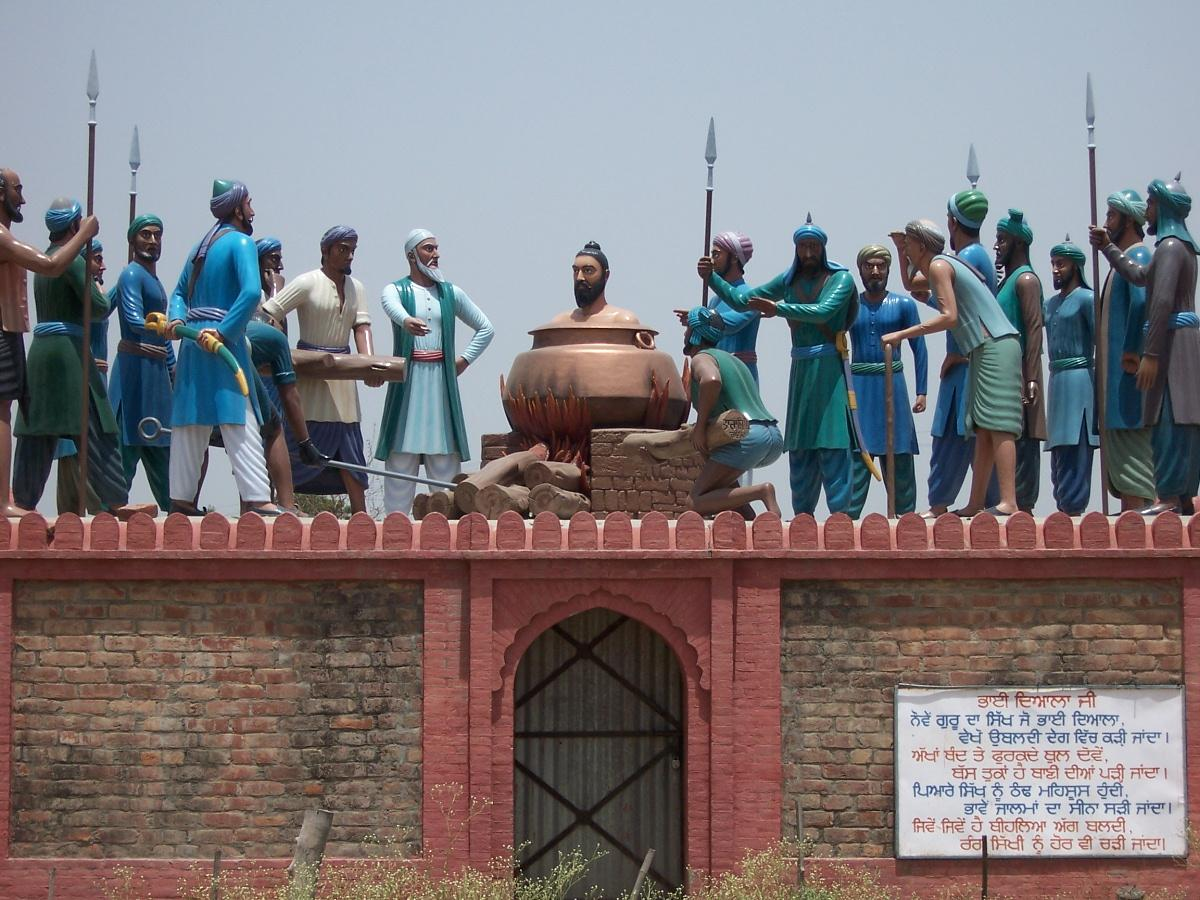
Diorama statues at Mehdiana Sahib depicting Bhai Dayala being boiled alive

Bhai Dayala was one of the followers who accompanied Guru Tegh Bahadur when the latter left Anandpur for Delhi on 11 July 1675, the other two were brothers-Bhai Mati Das, a Dewan and Bhai Sati Das, a Scribe at Guru’s court. Along with the Ninth Guru, they were arrested on orders of Emperor Aurangzeb at Agra.

== Death ==
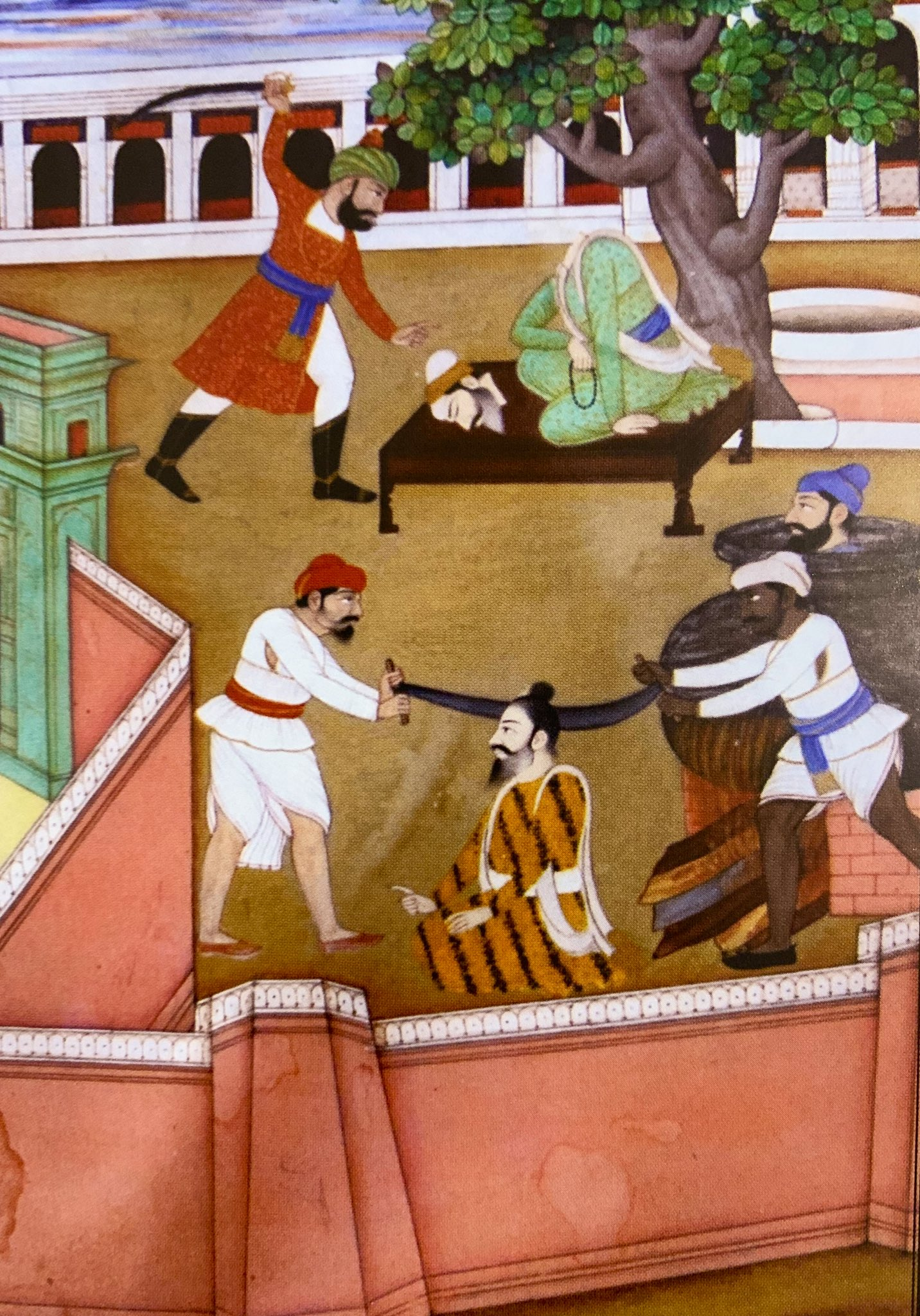
Detail of Basahatullah's 19th century painting of the execution of Guru Tegh Bahadur (beheaded), Bhai Mati Das (sawed in two), and Bhai Dayala Das (boiling in cauldron).

On 11 November 1675 after Bhai Mati Das' execution Bhai Dayala refuted with temperament against the Mughals calling Aurangzeb a tyrant and cursed him for committing atrocities in the name of God and religion and said there would be a demise of the Mughal empire. Bhai Dayala was tied with an iron chain like a bundle then was made to stand erect into a big cauldron full of water with only his head and shoulders seen. The vessel was then heated to the boiling point as Bhai Dayala began to recite Japji Sahib. He was then roasted into a block of charcoal.

== See also ==
- Bhai Mati Das
- Bhai Sati Das
- Guru Tegh Bahadur
