= Karyala =

- Village and union council
- Location in Pakistan
- Coordinates: 32°50′0″N 72°53′0″E
- Country: Pakistan
- Region: Punjab Province
- District: Chakwal District

Population
  - Village and union council: 12,000
  - Urban: 12,900
- Time zone: UTC+5 (PST)

Karyala is a village and union council of Chakwal District in the Punjab province of Pakistan. It is part of Chakwal Tehsil. The village sits atop the Surla hills. This part of the country is known as Dhani meaning rich. A few kilometres away are the Khewra Salt Mines, which are some of the oldest in the world, and coal mines of Dandot.

== Location ==
The town is about ten kilometres from Chakwal on the road to the Katas Raj Temples complex.

== History ==
=== Katas Lake ===
The Katas lake is a significant landmark in the region. Legend connects it to the Mahabharata. It is believed by Hindus to be the very pool, where the Pandava, Yudhishthira was tested by his father, Lord Yama/Dharma in the form of a Yaksha. A big Hindu fair used to be held there up to 1947.
