= Gurdwara Rakab Ganj Sahib =

Gurdwara in Delhi, India

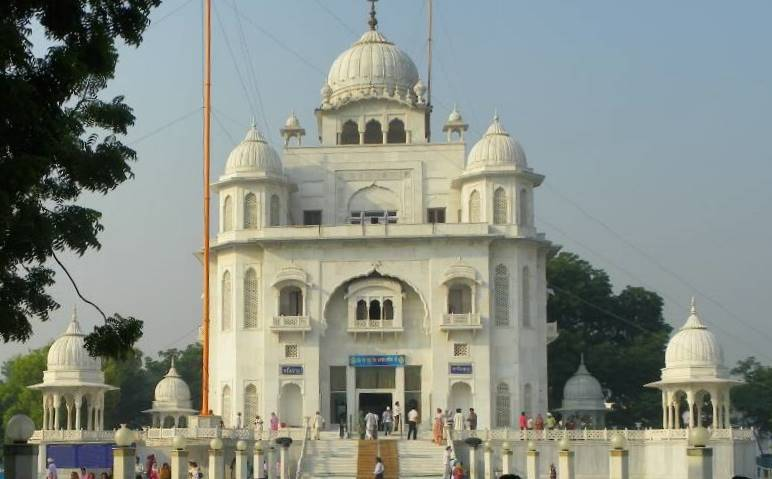
- Gurdwara Rakab Ganj Sahib Delhi

Religion
- Affiliation: Sikhism

Location
- Location: Pandit Pant Marg, Gurdwara Rakab Ganj Road, New Delhi, India.
- State: Delhi
- Interactive map of Gurdwara Rakab Ganj Sahib
- Coordinates: 28°37′5.473″N 77°12′17.327″E

Architecture
- Style: Sikh architecture
- Completed: built in 1783, current structure mostly built post 1947

The Gurdwara Rakab Ganj Sahib is a historic gurdwara near Parliament House in New Delhi. It was built in 1783, after Sikh military leader Baghel Singh (1730–1802) captured Delhi, on 11 March 1783, and his brief stay in Delhi led to the construction of several Sikh religious shrines in the city. This one marks the site of cremation of the ninth Sikh Guru, Guru Tegh Bahadur, after his martyrdom in November 1675 for helping Kashmiri Hindu Pandits, under orders of the Mughal Emperor Aurangzeb. The Gurudwara Sahib is built near old Raisina village near Raisina Hill, at present Pandit Pant Marg, took 12 years to build. Prior to that, a mosque had been built near the spot.

The Gurdwara Rakabganj sahib is also home to the Delhi Sikh Gurdwara Management Committee.

== History ==
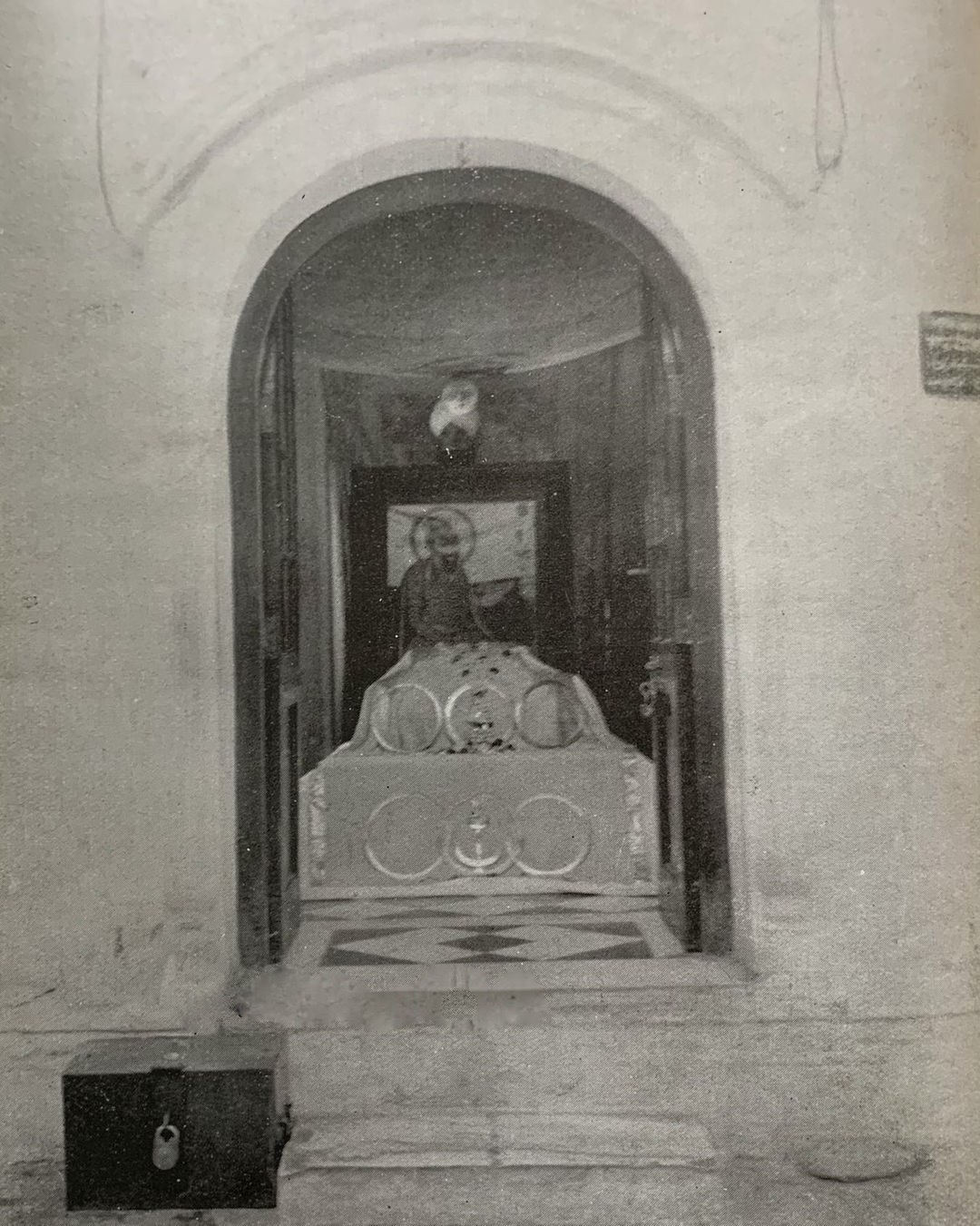
Photograph of the location where Guru Tegh Bahadur's body was cremated by Bhai Lakhi Rai Banjara, Gurdwara Rakab Ganj Sahib, Delhi, ca.1920's

The Gurdwara marks the site, where Lakhi Shah Banjara and his son Bhai Naghaiya burnt their own house to cremate the headless body of the Sikh Guru Guru Tegh Bahadur sahib who, on 11 November 1675, was martyred by beheading at Chandni Chowk on the orders of the Mughal emperor Aurangzeb for refusing to convert to Islam and buried the ashes in the house itself. In 1707 when Guru Gobind Singh tenth Sikh guru came to Delhi to meet prince Muzaum later Mughal emperor Bahadur Shah I, he located the place of cremation with help of local Sikhs and built a simple Memorial there. Later a mosque came to be built at site which s. Baghel Singh had to demolish in 1783 to raise gurdwara at the place. Muslims again built a mosque at site during mutiny of 1857. Sikhs took the matter to court which decided in favour of Sikhs and they quickly rebuilt the Gurdwara. Another dispute arose when during 1914 a portion of boundary wall was demolished by British Goveronment to straighten a passage to viceregal building. On a protest and agitation raised by Sikhs Goveronment yielded as soon as World War I came to end in 1918, and boundary wall was rebuilt at public expense. Construction of present building was started in 1960 and was completed in 1967–68.

The spot where the Guru sahib were beheaded is marked by Gurdwara Sis Ganj Sahib. The Guru sahib's severed head was brought from Delhi to Anandpur Sahib in Punjab by Bhai Jaita ji (later Bhai Jiwan Singh) and was cremated by his son, Guru Gobind Rai, who later became Guru Gobind Singh, the tenth Guru of the Sikhs.

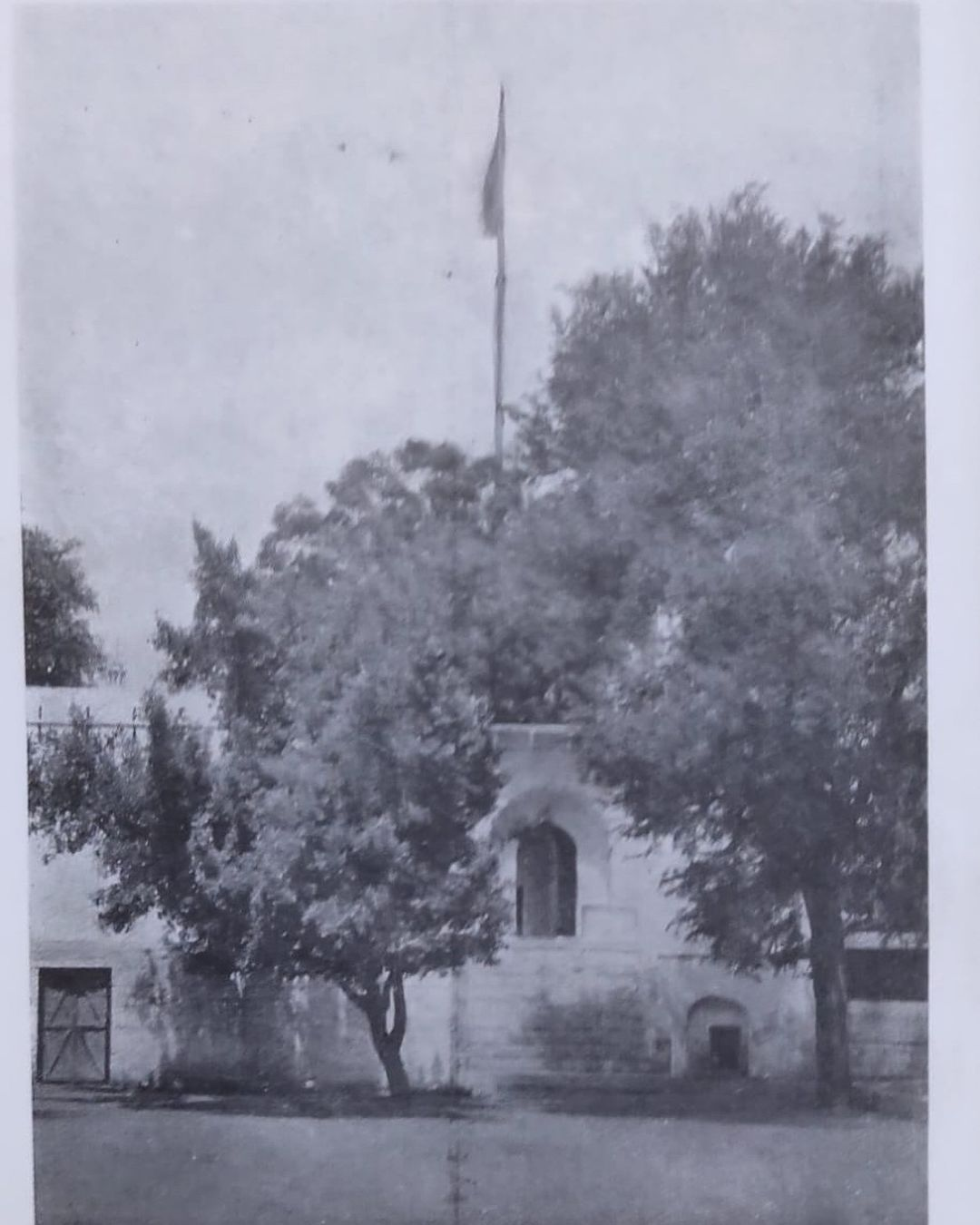
Photograph of Gurdwara Rakab Ganj Sahib, Delhi, ca.1920's

In the early 1950s, the Sikh Panth decided to create a befitting memorial at the holy site where the Ninth Guru of the Sikhs, Guru Teg Bahadur Sahib, was cremated secretly by a Labana Sikh, an ardent devotee of the 7th, 8th, 9th and 10th Sikh Gurus, named Lakhi Shah. At a meeting of the Panth where several prominent Sikhs had gathered to plan the construction, a businessman from Delhi, stood up and with great humility, holding up his shirt as a begging bowl, beseeched the panth to grant him the entire Seva of building the Gurdwara at the holy site near the Parliament House in New Delhi. This man was Harnam Singh Suri who had moved to Delhi from Rawalpindi, (present-day Pakistan) in 1947. The panth agreed to grant him the seva and S. Harnam Singh Suri worked tirelessly, to build it to perfection, until it was completed in and around 1969. He requested, Sevapanthi Sant Nischal Singh Ji to lay the foundation stone, and Sant Ji consented and attended the foundation stone laying ceremony, where he laid the first bricks in the foundation.

The Delhi Sikh Gurdwara Management Committee has made a 1984 Sikh Genocide Memorial, also known as the 'Wall of Truth', in the Gurdwara complex to memorise large scale violence that existed against Sikhs during 1984. In this names of those killed are transcribed on a wall.

In 2018, a group of Sikhs led by Sukhvinder Singh Sodhi conducted a sitting protest at the gurdwara to prevent unexplained "Kar Seva" renovations by the DSGMC that was damaging the courtyard of the complex.

=== Attack on temple ===
In 1984, Hindu mob of 4000, gathered around the Sikh temple and began vandalizing by stoning it. The Sikhs within the temple retaliated by opening fire until the Police responded with rifle fire of about five rounds. One individual, believed to be Sikh, was set on fire outside the temple.

== See also ==
- Gurudwara Bangla Sahib
