= Das (surname) =

Surname in South Asia

Origin
- Origin: Bengali Hindu
- Region of origin: Bengal

Das is a common last name in South Asia, among adherents of Hinduism and Sikhism, as well as those who converted to Islam or Christianity. It is a derived from the Sanskrit word Dasa (Sanskrit: दास) meaning devotee, disciple, votary, or servant, one engaged in selfless service or sevā. "Das" refers to one who serves God or has surrendered to God. The surname is often used by those in Assamese, Bengali, Bihari, Odia, Punjabi, and Vaishnav communities.

== Bengal, Bihar and Jharkhand ==
Das is a common surname among various castes and classes of Bengalis including Baidya, Bengali Kayastha, Mahishya, Tantubay, and others. In Bengal, the surname is also used by both Scheduled Castes and General Castes. In Bihar, it is used by people belonging to Ambashtha and Karn Kayastha castes.

More broadly, in Bengal, Bihar, and Jharkhand, the surname "Das" is also used by the Dhobi and Patni communities.

== Assam ==
In Assam, the Kaibarta, the Patni, the Koch-Rajbanshi, the Kalita and other communities also use Das as their surname.

== Odisha ==
In Odisha, the Das surname is used by the Gopal and Karan castes, while "Dash" is used by the Brahmins.

== Punjab ==
In Punjab, they generally belong to the Brahmin caste.

== Karnataka ==
In Karnataka, the Das surname is used by a section of Vokkaligas who profess Vaishnavism called Das Vokkaligas.

== Notable people ==
- Abhishek Das, Indian football player
- Ajit Das, Indian actor
- Amil Kumar Das, Indian astronomer
- Anindya Das, Indian physicist
- Arjun Das, Indian actor
- Ashok Kumar Das, Indian politician
- Atulananda Das, Indian botanist
- Bhagavan Das, Indian Theosophist
- Bhagavan Das, an American yogi
- Bhai Dyal Das, Sikh martyr
- Bhai Mati Das, Sikh martyr
- Bhai Sati Das, Sikh martyr
- Bibhusita Das, Indian marine engineer
- Bina Das, Indian revolutionary and nationalist
- Bishnu Charan Das, Indian politician
- Biswanath Das, Indian politician
- Brojen Das, Bangladeshi swimmer
- Chittaranjan Das, a Bengali lawyer and a major figure in the Indian independence movement
- Denish Das, an Assamese cricketer
- Dinesh Das, a Bengali poet
- Durga Mohan Das, religious leader and social reformer
- Gardhab Das, fictional character
- Gobindachandra Das, a Bengali poet and writer
- Gopabandhu Das, Indian freedom fighter, reformer, journalist and educationist from Odisha
- Gopala Ballabha Das, Indian writer and deputy magistrate
- Gurcharan Das, Indian Punjabi columnist for The Times of India
- Guru Amar Das, the third of the Ten Gurus of Sikhism
- Guru Ram Das, the fourth of the Sikh gurus
- Hima Das, Assamese sprinter
- Indrapramit Das, Indian science fiction, fantasy and cross genre writer from Kolkata
- Jagannath Prasad Das, researcher in psychometrics and author of the (PASS theory of intelligence)
- Jatin Das, Indian painter from Odisha
- Jatindra Nath Das, Freedom fighter
- Jibanananda Das, a Bengali poet
- K. S. R. Das, Indian film director
- Kamala Das, Indian poet and author
- Khagen Das, Indian politician
- Liton Das, Bangladeshi Cricketer
- Madhusudan Das, Odia lawyer and Indian nationalist of the 19th century
- Maharaja Bhagwant Das, King of Jaipur (1527–1589)
- Manoj Das, English and Odia writer
- Mini Das, Indian and American image processing researcher
- Mohini Mohan Das, Indian politician, writer and activist from West Bengal.
- Monica Das, Indian feminist economist
- Moumita Das, Indian physicist
- Mrinal Kanti Das, Bangladeshi politician
- Naba Das, Indian politician
- Namit Das is an Indian film and theatre actor.
- Nandita Das, Indian film actress/director from Odisha
- Niloy Das (1961–2006), Bangladeshi guitarist
- Nobin Chandra Das, Entrepreneur and inventor of Bengali Rosogolla
- Parichay Das, path-breaker Bhojpuri- Hindi poet, essayist, critic
- Prosenjit Das, Indian cricketer
- Pulin Behari Das, Revolutionary, founder of Dhaka Anushilan Samiti.
- Pushpalata Das, Indian independence activist, social worker, Gandhian and legislator from Assam
- Radha Charan Das, Former Vice-Chancellor of Berhampur University
- Raja Bhagwant Das, Rajasthani ruler of Amber
- Raja Sitaram Ray, born Sitaram Das was an autonomous king of Bengal.
- Ram Dass, American spiritual teacher, yoga guru, and author
- Ranjan Das, Bangladeshi cricketer
- Ranjit Das (footballer), Bangladeshi football player and coach
- Ranjit Das (politician), Indian politician from Tripura
- Rima Das, Assamese Indian filmmaker
- Riyan Parag Das, Assamese cricketer
- Sadhu Sitaram Das, Indian revolutionary
- Sarala Dasa, 14th-century poet of Odisha
- Sarat Chandra Das, Indian scholar of Tibetan language
- Satish Ranjan Das, legal representative for the Indian government
- Saumitra Das, Indian microbiologist
- Seth Govind Das, a member of Indian Parliament
- Shoshi Mukhi Das, Indian missionary, teacher and nurse
- Shaktikanta Das, Governor of R.B.I.
- Shiv Sunder Das, Indian Cricketer from Odisha
- Shomie Das, schoolmaster
- Shraddha Das, Indian film actress
- Sudhi Ranjan Das, 5th Chief Justice of India
- Suhasini Das, politician from Bangladesh
- Surya Das, American religious educator
- Tapan Das, Indian actor
- Tarak Chandra Das, anthropologist, author, former teacher in University of Calcutta
- Tarak Nath Das, Indian revolutionary and Internationalist scholar
- Vasundhara Das, Indian actress and singer
- Veena Das, a professor of anthropology
- Vir Das, comedian and actor

== See also ==
- Das (disambiguation)
- Dasa
- Dass (disambiguation)
- Dhas
- Gopal Das (disambiguation)
