= Das =

Das or DAS may refer to:

== Organizations ==
- Dallas Animal Services, the animal shelter agency of Dallas, Texas
- Dame Allan's Schools, Fenham, Newcastle upon Tyne, England.
- Danish Aviation Systems, a supplier and developer of unmanned aerial vehicles.
- Departamento Administrativo de Seguridad, a former Colombian intelligence agency.
- Department of Applied Science, UC Davis.
- Debt Arrangement Scheme, Scotland, see Accountant in Bankruptcy.

== Places ==
- Das (crater), a lunar impact crater on the far side of the Moon
- Das (island), an Emirati island in the Persian Gulf
  - Das Island Airport
- Das, Catalonia, a village in the Cerdanya, Spain
- Das, Iran, a village in Razavi Khorasan Province
- Great Bear Lake Airport, Northwest Territories, Canada (IATA code)

== Science ==
- 1,2-Bis(dimethylarsino)benzene, a chemical compound.
- DAS28, Disease Activity Score of 28 joints, rheumatoid arthritis measure.
- Differential Ability Scales, cognitive and achievement tests.

== Technology ==
- Data acquisition system
- Defensive aids system, an aircraft defensive system
- Digital Access Service, a system for exchanging legal documents electronically
- Direct-attached storage, a digital storage system
- Distributed acoustic sensing, systems use fiber optic cables to provide distributed strain sensing
- Distributed antenna system, a network of spatially separated antenna nodes
- Distributed Aperture System, a type of infrared search and track sensors
- Double acting ship, trademark for a type of ice-breaking ship
- Draw a Secret, a graphical password scheme
- Dual Address Space, an IBM System/370 feature
- AN/AAQ-37 Electro-optical Distributed Aperture System, sensor system of the Lockheed Martin F-35 Lightning II
- Dual Axis Steering, on the Mercedes-AMG F1 W11 EQ Performance

== Other uses ==
- Das (surname), a common surname or title in South Asia
- Das or dasa, Sanskrit word meaning servant
- Das (studio), a Japanese adult video studio
- Das, the German grammatical neuter article, equivalent to "the" in English
- Das DD, a Singaporean comedian

== See also ==
- Dasa (disambiguation)
- Dass (disambiguation)
- Daas (disambiguation)
- Dus (disambiguation)
- DSA (disambiguation)
- Devdas (disambiguation)
- Dhas
