= Dasa (disambiguation) =

Dasa refers to a devotee, surname, tribe, enemy, or servant in Sanskrit.

Dasyu

Dasa or DASA may also refer to:

- DASA, also known as Deutsche Aerospace, Daimler-Benz Aerospace and DaimlerChrysler Aerospace, a former German aircraft manufacturer
- Dasà, a town in Italy
- Dasa-eup, a town in Daegu, South Korea
- Defence Analytical Services Agency, later Defence Analytical Services and Advice, formerly part of the British Ministry of Defence
- Defence and Security Accelerator, competitive portal for Dstl, part of the British Ministry of Defence
- Defense Atomic Support Agency, later Defense Nuclear Agency and then Defense Special Weapons Agency, now part of the U.S. Defense Threat Reduction Agency
- Diagnosticos da America S.A., a Brazilian company
- Dignity for All Students Act, a New York State law against discrimination and harassment in public educational settings
- Doclean Academy of Sciences and Arts, an academic institution in Montenegro
- Donor-acceptor Stenhouse adducts, a photoswitching molecule
- Eli Dasa (born 1992), Israeli footballer for Dynamo Moscow and the Israel national team

== See also ==
- Daas (disambiguation)
- Daasi (disambiguation)
- Das (disambiguation)
- Dasan and Vijayan, fictional characters in a series of Indian films
- Dasi (disambiguation)
- Dass (disambiguation)
- Devdas (disambiguation)
