= Shoshi =

Shoshi may refer to:

- Shoshi (tribe), a historical tribe (fis) and region of northern Albania
- Shosh, Albania, village of northern Albania and historical center of that region

== People with the name ==
=== Given name ===
- Shoshi Mukhi Das (1868–1921), British Indian missionary, teacher and nurse

=== Surname ===
- Kazuharu Shoshi (所司 和晴; born 1961), Japanese shogi player
- Lis Shoshi (born 1994), Kosovan basketball player
- Maringlen Shoshi (born 1987), Albanian footballer
- Zef Shoshi, Albanian painter

== See also ==
- Princess Shōshi (disambiguation)
- Empress Shōshi (988–1074)
