= List of medical abbreviations: D =

Sortable table
Abbreviation	Meaning
D_{S}	diagnosis
D5	5% dextrose
D25	25% dextrose injections
D4T	stavudine
D5W	5% dextrose in water - IV fluids for intravenous therapy
d	day(s)
DA	dopamine
DAEC	diffusely adherent Escherichia coli
DAF	decay accelerating factor
DAI	diffuse axonal injury
DALY	disability-adjusted life year
DAPT	dual anti-platelet therapy
DBE	Double-balloon enteroscopy
DBP	diastolic blood pressure
DBS	deep brain stimulation dried blood spots
D&C	dilatation and curettage
D/C	discharge discontinue
DCBE	double contrast barium enema
DCD	donation after cardiac death developmental coordination disorder
DCCV	direct current cardioversion
DCDA	dichorionic diamniotic
DCIS	ductal carcinoma in situ
DCM	dilated cardiomyopathy
DCP	Dynamic compression plate
DD	differential diagnosis Diastolic Dysfunction
DDAVP	deamino D-arginine vasopressin
DDC	zalcitabine
DDD	daily defined doses Degenerative disk disease
DDH	developmental hip dysplasia
DDI	didanosine
DDx	differential diagnosis
D&E	dilatation and evacuation
DEE	developmental and epileptic encephalopathy
DES	diethylstilbestrol Drug-eluting stent
DEXA	Dual energy X-ray absorptiometry
DH	developmental history Department of Health (United Kingdom), a branch of government
DHE	dihydroergotamine
DHEA-S	dehydroepiandrosterone sulphate
DHF	decompensated heart failure
DHR	dihydrorhodamine
DHT	dihydrotestosterone
DHT	Dobhoff Tube
DI	diabetes insipidus
DIB	dead in bed difficulty in breathing
DIC	disseminated intravascular coagulation
DICVP	Diplomate, International College of Veterinary Pharmacy
DID	Dissociative identity disorder
Di-Di	dichromatic diamnionic twins
DIL	drug-induced lupus
DILI	drug-induced liver injury
DIP	distal interphalangeal joint or Diffuse Interstitial Pneumonitis
DiPerTe	diphtheria-pertussis-tetanus (combined vaccination)
Dis	dislocation
Disch	discharge
DiTe	diphtheria-tetanus (combined vaccination)
DIU	death in utero (stillbirth)
DJD	degenerative joint disease (osteoarthritis)
DKA	diabetic ketoacidosis
dl	deciliter
dL	deciliter
DLB	dementia with Lewy bodies
DLCO	diffusing capacity of the lung for carbon monoxide
DLE	disseminated lupus erythematosus (systemic lupus erythematosus)
DLI	donor lymphocyte infusion
DLP	dyslipoproteinemia
DM	diabetes mellitus, Dermatomyositis
DM2	Type 2 diabetes, formerly known as Non-Insulin Dependent Diabetes Mellitus (NIDDM).
DMARD	disease-modifying antirheumatic drug
DMD	Duchenne muscular dystrophy; Dentariae Medicinae Doctor, that is, Doctor of Dental Medicine
DME	durable medical equipment
DMPA	depot medroxyprogesterone acetate
DMSA	dimercaptosuccinic acid
DMT	dimethyltryptamine
DNA	deoxyribonucleic acid
DNACPR	do not attempt cardiopulmonary resuscitation
DNI	do not intubate
DNR	do not resuscitate
DNAR	do not attempt resuscitation
DO	Doctor of Osteopathic Medicine
D/O	died of, disorder
DOA	dead on arrival drugs of abuse
DOB	Date of birth
DOE	dyspnea on exertion
DOH	Department of Health
DOL	day of life
DORV	double outlet right ventricle
DOS	date of service
DOSS	docusate sodium; from the chemical name dioctyl sodium sulfosuccinate
DP	dorsalis pedis
DPH	diphenylhydantoin
DPL	diagnostic peritoneal lavage
DPLD	diffuse parenchymal lung disease
DPM	Doctor of Podiatric Medicine
DPT	diphtheria-pertussis-tetanus (DPT vaccine)
DRE	Digital Rectal ExaminationDilated Retinal Exam
DRPLA	Dentatorubral-Pallidoluysian Atrophy
DRT	dead right there
DS	disease Down syndrome (trisomy 21) diopters sphere
DSA	digital subtraction angiography Donor specific antibody
DSD	differences of sex development dry sterile dressing
Dsg	dressing
DSM	Diagnostic and Statistical Manual of Mental Disorders
dsRNA	double-stranded RNA
DT	diphtheria-tetanus (combined vaccination) delirium tremens
D/T	due to
DTA	descending thoracic aorta
DTaP	diphtheria–tetanus–acellular pertussis (combined vaccination)
DTP	diphtheria-tetanus-pertussis (combined vaccination)
DTR	deep tendon reflex
DTs	delirium tremens
DU	duodenal ulcer (see peptic ulcer)
DUB	dysfunctional uterine bleeding
DVT	deep vein thrombosis
D/W	discussed with
DW	dextrose in water
DWM	Dandy-Walker malformation
DWS	Dandy-Walker syndrome
D5W	5% dextrose in water
DX; Dx	diagnosis
DXA	Dual-energy X-ray absorptiometry
DZ	disease
