= Daasi =

Daasi may refer to:

- Female form of dasa, slave in Sanskrit (devotee of a Hindu deity)
- Daasi (1952 film), Indian Telugu-language drama film
- Daasi (1988 film), Indian Telugu-language drama film by B. Narsing Rao
- Daasi (TV series), 2019 Pakistani romantic drama

== See also ==
- Dasi (disambiguation)
- Dasa (disambiguation)
