= Gokuldas Malpani =

Indian businessman

Raja Gokuldas

President of the Municipal council of Jabalpur
- In office 1880s–1880s

Personal details
- Born: 1839 Jabalpur
- Died: 11 December 1909 (aged 69–70) Jabalpur, Central Provinces and Berar, British India
- Spouse: Chunni Bai
- Children: Vitthal Das, Jeevan Das
- Parent: Khushalchand (father)
- Relatives: Seth Govind Das (grandson); Vallabh Das (nephew)
- Profession: Businessman
- Website: https://www.gokuldas.com/

Raja Gokuldas RB (1839–1909) was a Marwari millionaire from Jabalpur during colonial rule in India. He was the wealthiest banker in the Central Provinces of British India. Born into a prominent family of Marwari bankers in Jabalpur, his banking firm was one of the "great Marwari firms" as termed by T.A. Timberg.

== Background and early life ==
Gokuldas was born to the first wife of Khushalchand Malpani in 1839. His grandfather, Sewa Ram, was a Marwari of the Maheshwari caste who migrated from his hometown in Jaisalmer to Jabalpur around 1800. He earned a fortune and was succeeded by Khushalchand, his son and Gokuldas's father.

Gokuldas acquired his meagre education at Gulan Rai's school, Jabalpur. After learning basic Hindi, he left school to learn business methods and the Marwari alphabet. He started from the post of cashier and gradually advanced through the ranks in the family business.

== Career ==
Gokuldas's grandfather Sewa Ram and father Khushalchand had already built up a prospering family business and earnt a fortune. Hence he carried on the same after his father's death in 1865. His father had supported the British financially during the Revolt of 1857 and had gained their goodwill. As a result of this, he was closely associated with the European elite of the period including Henry Ashbrooke Crump, the Chief Commissioner of the Central Provinces.

He founded cotton mills called "Raja Gokuldas Mills" and the "Perfect Pottery Works" at such time when these industries were not popular in the country. In 1897, Gokuldas set up a chain of ginning and pressing factories at Gadarwara, Piparia, Harda, Khandwa, Wardha and more places in the Central Provinces and Berar, and at Banda and Etawah in Uttar Pradesh and Multan in Punjab.

He expanded his business to the large cities of Bombay, Calcutta and even Rangoon in Burma. The shops at Bombay, Calcutta and Rangoon were considered to be one of the biggest of their respective markets. He used spend 9 months each year on a tour of his shops spread across the country, for the purpose of surveillance and maintaining discipline.

In the 1880s, he focused on consolidating his family's commercial and position of prestige in the Central Provinces. He initially became a member and then president of the Municipal council of Jabalpur in the 1880s. He was repeatedly elected unopposed and subsequently his nephew Vallabh Das succeeded him to the post uninterrupted for the next 18 years. In 1883, Lord Ripon, the Viceroy of British India conferred the title of "Rai Bahadur" upon him. In 1889, he was given the title of Raja or "ruler" by the British government in recognition of his great wealth and power. This was also because he was a large malguzar (landlord), owning more than 200 villages and estates across the country, especially in the Central Provinces. He was elected as president of the first caste association, the Maheshwari Sabha.

In 1889, he also constructed the building of Madhya Pradesh High Court at Jabalpur at the cost of about Rupees Three Lacs.

== Personal life ==
Gokuldas had a half-brother named Gopaldas, who was two years younger than him and with whom Gokuldas was very close. Gopaldas died young in 1869, leaving his son Vallabh Das in the former's care.

Gokuldas was married to Chunni Bai, the daughter of Pratapchand, a well known banker from Jaipur. In 1862, he had a son named Vitthal Das from Chunni Bai. However, Vitthal Das died in 1869, four years after his father Khushalchand's death. A second son named Jeevan Das was born to him in 1871, whose birth was believed to be the result of a saint's benediction.

He had close relations with several rulers of "princely states", especially those in Rajasthan. According to Philip F. McEldowney- "He made ceremonial visits to these rulers and in return, in Rajasthan in particular, he received honorary recognition of his position and privileged concessions for any business established there". Some of these rulers included Maharawal Bairi Sal and his successor Maharawal Shalivahan Singh III of Jaisalmer State, Madho Singh II of Jaipur State, Jaswant Singh II of Jodhpur State

Jiwajirao Scindia of Gwalior State, Chamarajendra Wadiyar X of Mysore State, and the rulers of Rewa State, Bhopal State, Ratlam State, Burdwan Raj, Travancore, Cochin kingdom were entertained as guests in his palace.

== Successors ==
After Gokuldas's death in 1909, the vast inheritance was equally divided among Jeevan Das, Gokuldas's son and Vallabh Das, his nephew. Jeevan Das, being born with a golden spoon in his mouth, gained a reputation as an extravagant spender. Vallabh Das spent a considerable portion of his wealth on market speculation. The active participation of Gokuldas's grandson,Govind Das, in the Indian independence movement under Mahatma Gandhi antagonized the British against them and also exhausted a large portion of the family wealth. Hence, the Malpani family was almost completely ruined financially.

However, the family's decline was stopped after Indian independence, Seth Govind Das, the grandson of Gokuldas revived the family's fortunes after energetic efforts.

== Public works ==
Raja Gokuldas is chiefly remembered in Jabalpur for his contribution to the city's infrastructure. In 1868-1869, the Hanumantal lake and temple were in a poor condition hence a donation was made by Raja Gokuldas for its restoration. The Khandari Water Works, built by Gokuldas were an essential part of Jabalpur infrastructure in colonial times.

In 1885, upon a request by Hariot Hamilton-Temple, the wife of the British Viceroy Lord Dufferin, Raja Gokuldas built the "Lady Elgin hospital" which was one of the first women's hospitals in the region. Today, Lady Elgin hospital is known as "Rani Durgavati hospital".

== Criticism ==
According to Mircea Raianu, British colonial leaders viewed Gokuldas with suspicion as a mere social climber angling for a title and seeking legitimacy through philanthropic largesse. Local officials in the Central Provinces did praise Gokuldas in public, but they were skeptical of his pretensions to princely status.
