= Sriram Ramaswamy =

Indian physicist (born 1957)

Sriram Ramaswamy FRS
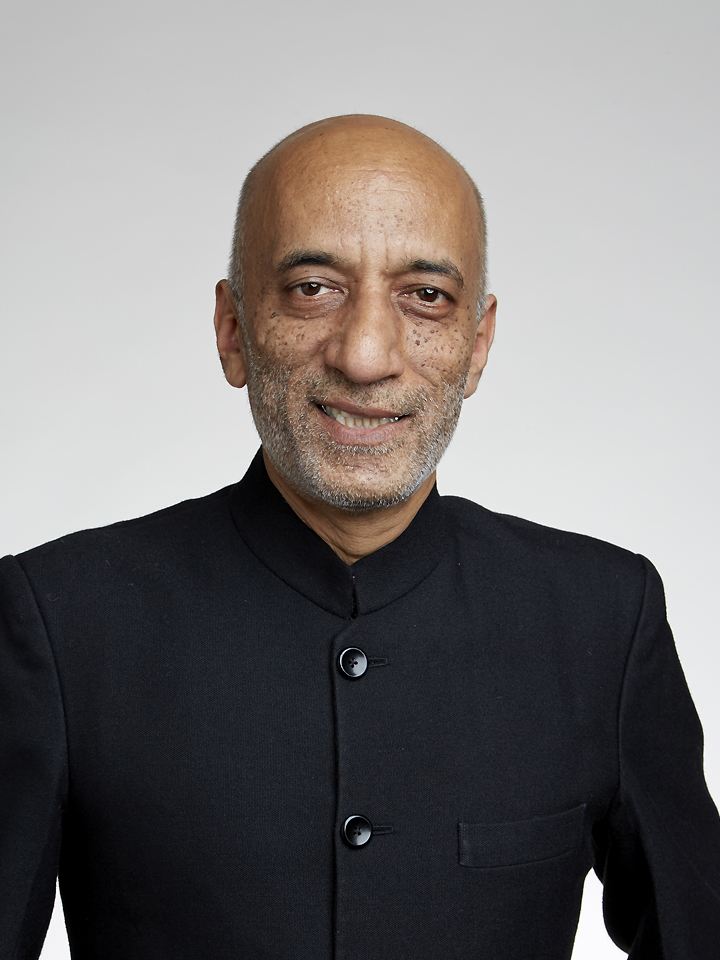
- Ramaswamy in 2016
- Born: 10 November 1957 (age 68)
- Education: University of Maryland; University of Chicago
- Awards: Infosys Prize; Shanti Swarup Bhatnagar Prize for Science and Technology
- Scientific career
- Fields: Theoretical physics
- Workplaces: Indian Institute of Science; Tata Institute of Fundamental Research (TIFR)
- Thesis: Solid like behaviour in liquid layers: a theory of the yield stress in smectics (1983)
- Doctoral students: Moumita Das
- Website: www.physics.iisc.ernet.in/~sriram/

Sriram Rajagopal Ramaswamy (born 10 November 1957) is an Indian physicist. He is a professor at the Indian Institute of Science, Bangalore, and previously the director of the Tata Institute of Fundamental Research (TIFR) Centre for Interdisciplinary Sciences in Hyderabad.

== Education ==
Ramaswamy completed high school at the Modern School, Barakhamba Road, New Delhi, and then moved to the University of Maryland where he was awarded a Bachelor of Science degree in Physics with high honours in 1977. He completed his PhD in theoretical physics at the University of Chicago, graduating in 1983. He completed postdoctoral research at the University of Pennsylvania.

== Research ==
Ramaswamy is a theoretician whose research investigates nonequilibrium statistical physics, soft matter, condensed matter physics and biological physics. His research helped found the field of active matter, which studies the motility and related collective behaviour of objects that convert local energy input into autonomous motion.

He is widely known for formulating the hydrodynamic equations governing the alignment, flow, mechanics and statistical properties of suspensions of self-propelled creatures, on scales from a cell to the ocean. Key predictions—that macroscopically aligned flocks of swimming bacteria are impossible, and that the addition of swimmers to a fluid can make the viscosity arbitrarily small—have been confirmed in recent experiments. His insight into nonliving imitations of self-propulsion has led to design principles for chemotactic colloids, the first experiments observing giant number fluctuations in flocks, and the creation of flocks with a tiny minority of motile constituents.

== Awards and honours ==
Among the awards he has received for his research are the Shanti Swarup Bhatnagar Prize for Science and Technology in 2000 and the Infosys Prize for Physical Sciences in 2011. He also served on the Physical Sciences jury for the Infosys Prize in 2014. He was elected a Fellow of the Royal Society (FRS) in 2016.

He was awarded one of the H K Firodia awards for 2016. He was elected an International Member of the US National Academy of Sciences in 2025.
