= DSA =

DSA or Dsa may refer to:

== Education ==
- Detroit School of Arts, a grades 9–12 public school in the US
- DeKalb School of the Arts, a grades 8–12 public school in the US
- Denver School of the Arts, a grades 6–12 public school in the US
- Durham School of the Arts, a grades 6–12 public school in the US
- Deutsche Schule Algarve, a German school in Portugal
- Deutsche Schule Athen, the German School of Athens, Greece
- Direct School Admission, Singapore
- Disabled Students' Allowance, a UK government grant for students in higher education

== Information technology ==
- Digital Signature Algorithm, a cryptographic standard for digital signatures
- Directory System Agent, an IT standard, part of X.500
- Domain-Specific Architecture; see Pixel Visual Core
- Debian Security Advisory, security advisories for the Debian Linux operating system
- Data structure alignment, in computer memory
- Data structures and algorithms
- Dynamic storage allocation, runtime reservation of address space from the free store
- Intel Data Streaming Accelerator, a technology used in Intel Xeon processors
- Intel Driver & Support Assistant, a software update tool by Intel

== Organizations ==
- Democratic Socialists of America, a political organization in the US
- Dante Society of America, an academic society in the US promoting the study of Dante Alighieri
- Direct Selling Association, a U.S.-based national trade association
- Defence Safety Authority, UK
- Development Studies Association, UK and Ireland
- Down's Syndrome Association, a British charity
- Driving Standards Agency, UK
- DSA Myanmar, the Defense Services Academy
- The Dozenal Society of America, an advocacy group for the use of a base-12 numeral system

== Other uses ==
- Daily Subsistence Allowance, a per diem for UNDP staff
- Das Schwarze Auge, a role-playing game
- Deep Synoptic Array, a radio telescope under construction in Nevada, US
- Digital Security Act, 2018 (Bangladesh)
- Digital Services Act, a European Union regulation on digital content
- Digital subtraction angiography, a fluoroscopy technique
- Distinguished Service Award (OA), Order of the Arrow, Boy Scouts of America
- Doncaster Sheffield Airport, England (IATA code: DSA)
- Donor-specific antibody, in transplant medicine
- Dsa, a rare variant of the humid continental climate
- Dubai–Sharjah–Ajman, a conurbation of emirates in the UAE
- Duluth, South Shore and Atlantic Railway, a former railway company
- Mixed metal oxide electrode, dimensionally stable anodes in electrolysis
