= Dasi =

Dasi may refer to:

== Places ==
=== Mainland China ===
- Dasi, Qinzhou (大寺镇), town in Qinbei District, Qinzhou, Guangxi
- Dasi, Taizhou, Jiangsu (大泗镇), town in Gaogang District, Taizhou, Jiangsu
- Dasi, Tianjin (大寺镇), town in Xiqing District, Tianjin
- Dasi Township, Fengqing County (大寺乡), in Fengqing County, Yunnan

=== Taiwan ===
- Daxi District (大溪區), a district in Taoyuan City
- Dasi Station (大溪車站), a railway station in Toucheng Town, Yilan County

== Other ==
- Female form of dasa, slave in Sanskrit (devotee of a Hindu deity)
- Dashi, also spelled dasi, a Japanese soup stock
- Dassie, a local common name for hyraxes, mammals in the order hyracoidea
- Digital Array Scanned Interferometer, or DASI, a scientific instrument for the NASA ERAST Project
- Degree Angular Scale Interferometer, or DASI, telescope located in Antarctica
- Binodini Dasi (1862–1941), Calcutta-based, Bengali-speaking actress and thespian
- Malati Dasi, senior spiritual leader on the International Society for Krishna Consciousness
- Grand Master Dashi, a character from the anime series Xiaolin Showdown
- Das Dasi or Dasdasi, an Iranian adaptation of Oobi (TV series)

== See also ==
- Daxi (disambiguation)
- Dasa (disambiguation)
- Devadasi, female devotees in India dedicated to the worship of a temple's patron god
