= DAAS =

DAAS, DaaS or Daas may refer to:

- Data as a Service (DaaS), a model of delivering dynamic data
- Desktop as a service (DaaS): "desktop" virtualization in computing
- Daas (2005 film), an Indian Tamil-language romantic film
- Daas (2011 film), a Polish film
- Dad's Army Appreciation Society
- The Doug Anthony All Stars (stylized as D⋆A†A☭S), an Australian musical comedy group (1984–1994, 2014–present)
- Ain Arnat Airport (ICAO: DAAS) in Algeria
- The Arabic acronym for Islamic State of Iraq and the Levant
- Dismissive avoidant attachment style

== See also ==
- Dass (disambiguation)
- Das (disambiguation)
- Dasa (disambiguation)
