= Hitkarini College of Engineering and Technology =

Engineering college in Madhya Pradesh

Coordinates: 23°09′48.1″N 79°59′47.5″E

Hitkarini College of Engineering and Technology Jabalpur
- Motto: सर्वभूते हितार्थाय चलिम्यामो निरन्तरम् (Sanskrit)
- Motto in English: Always in motion for the good of all beings
- Type: Private Institution
- Established: 1997
- Chairman: Chandra Mohan
- Principal: Dr. Shailesh Gupta
- Dean: Dr. Smita Shrivastava
- Director: Dr. Sudhir Bhatt
- Academic staff: Above 50 (approx.)
- Undergraduates: Above 1000 (approx.)
- Location: Jabalpur, Madhya Pradesh, India
- Campus: Sub-urban, spread over 16 acres (6.5 ha) in the east of Jabalpur City
- Acronym: HCET
- Website: www.hcet.hitkarini.com

Hitkarini College of Engineering and Technology (abbreviated HCET or HCET Jabalpur) is a private technical institute located in Jabalpur, India. It is the second-oldest private engineering institute of the Mahakoshal region. It is a subsidiary of a historic educational society, the Hitkarini Sabha. The college is affiliated to the Rajiv Gandhi Technical University, Bhopal and All India Council for Technical Education, New Delhi.

== Campus ==
In 2000, HCET shifted from its old campus to a new campus building, which is located on top of a hill (now known as Hitkarini Hills) just 4 km (2.5 mi) from the Jabalpur Airport (also known as Dumna Airport). Since then, HCET has the largest infrastructure among the private Engineering institutes of Jabalpur. The college has a Central Library having more than 20,000 books. HCET is located in "Dumna" close to IIITDM Jabalpur, University of Jabalpur and the College of Material Management, Jabalpur. "Dumna" area is a popular sub-urban hilly area in Jabalpur because of its natural greenery and the Dumna Nature Reserve Park. The college campus houses a separate building for the Hitkarini Dental College and Hospital and shares its own part of the infrastructure with the Hitkarini College of Architecture and Town Planning, both being the child institutes of the same governing organization, the Hitkarini Sabha.

== Courses ==
HCET Jabalpur has 10 departments and an engineering workshop. The academic departments in HCET Jabalpur include the following:

- Engineering Chemistry
- Engineering Mathematics
- Engineering Physics
- Civil Engineering
- Computer Science & Engineering
- Electrical Engineering
- Electronics & Communication Engineering
- Humanities
- Information Technology
- Mechanical Engineering
