= Dhas =

Dhas is a surname. Notable people with the surname include:

- Antony Dhas (born 1988), Indian cricketer
- Dheena Chandra Dhas (born 1956), Indian actor and singer
- Jockson Dhas (born 1995), Indian soccer player
- Madhukar C. Dhas (1949-2024), Indian-American singer
- Sachin Dhas (born 2005), Indian cricketer
- Suresh Dhas, Indian politician

== See also ==
- Jerome Dhas Varuvel (born 1951) Indian Roman Catholic bishop
- Das (surname)
- Das (disambiguation)
