= Das Island Airport =

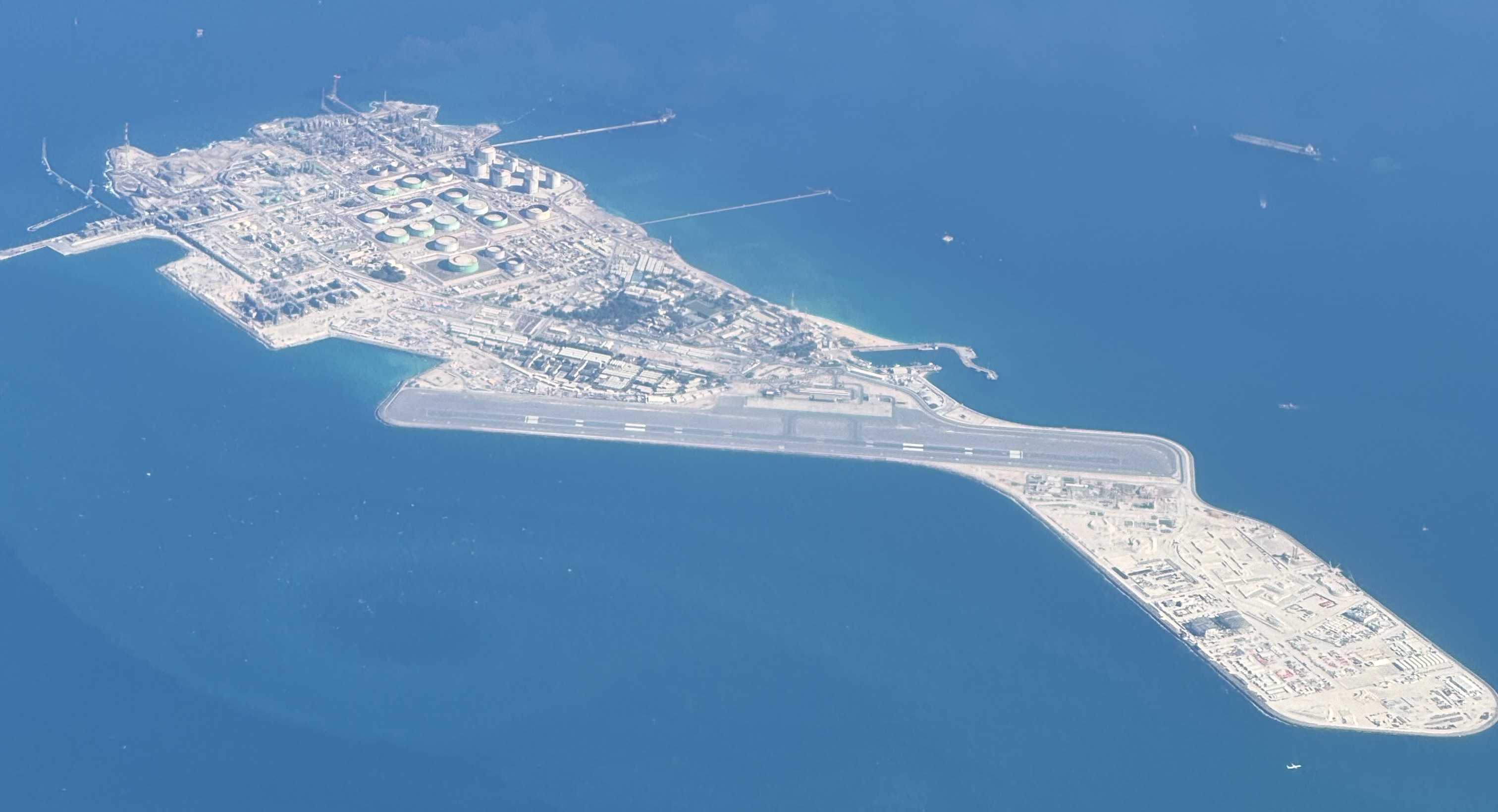
- Aerial view of Das Island Airport
- IATA: none; ICAO: OMAS

Summary
- Airport type: Private
- Operator: Abu Dhabi Marine Operating Company
- Location: Das Island, United Arab Emirates
- Time zone: UAE Standard Time (UTC+04:00)
- Elevation AMSL: 12 ft / 4 m
- Coordinates: 25°08′30″N 052°52′20″E

Map
- Location in the United Arab Emirates OMAS (Persian Gulf) OMAS (Indian Ocean) OMAS (Middle East) OMAS (West and Central Asia) OMAS (Asia)

Runways
Direction	Length		Surface
Direction	m	ft	Surface
15/33	1,078	3,537	Asphalt
- Sources: UAE AIP

Das Island Airport (ICAO: OMAS) is a private airfield operated by Abu Dhabi National Oil Company. It serves the oil field at Das Island, Abu Dhabi, United Arab Emirates.
