= Hitkarini Sabha =

Indian non-profit organization

Hitkarini Sabha हितकारिणी सभा (in Hindi)
- Established: 1868
- Type: Educational organization (non-profit)
- Legal status: Active
- Purpose: Education
- Headquarters: Jabalpur, India
- Coordinates: 23.166°N 79.934°E
- Region served: Madhya Pradesh, India
- Key people: Rajesh Agrawal (President); Mahendra Bhandari (Vice President); Sunaina Pateria (Vice President); Vishwa Mohan (Secretary); Nakhlesh Upadhyay (Joint Secretary)
- Subsidiaries: Hitkarini College of Engineering & Technology
- Employees: more than 1,000
- Website: www.hitkarini.com

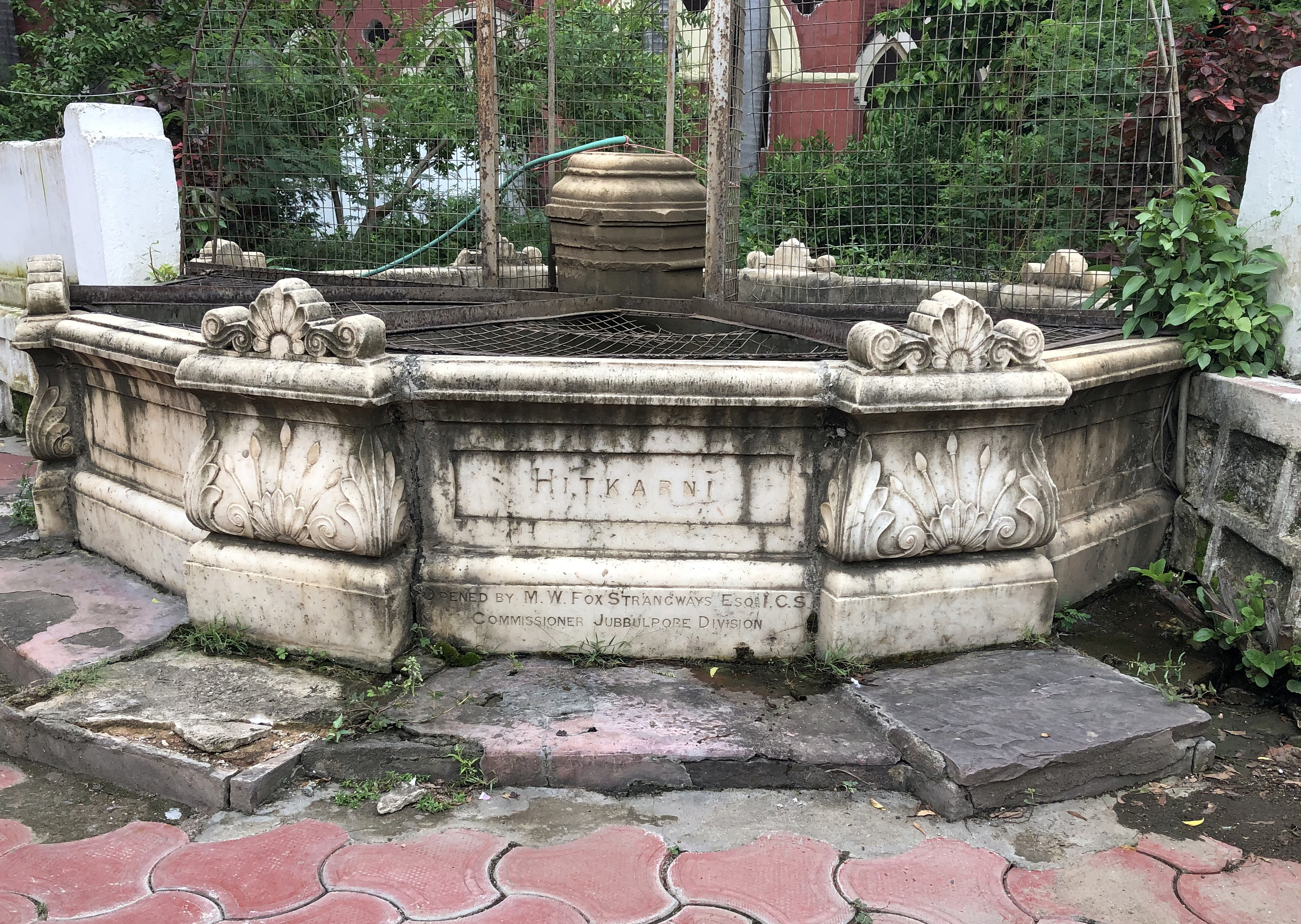
Hitkarini well opened by M.W. Fox Strangways, Commissioner, (late 1890s-early 1900s)

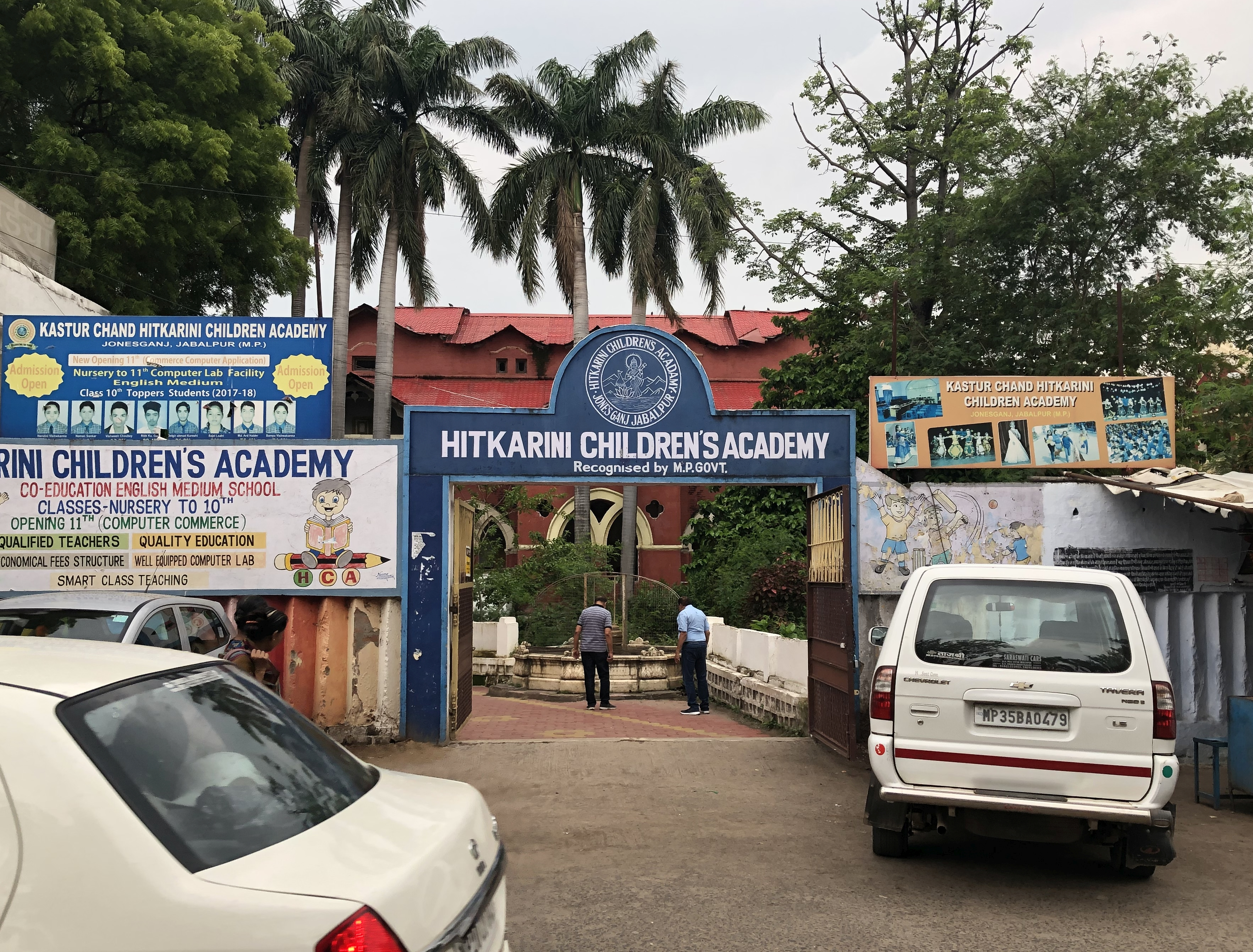
Kasturchand Hitkarini Childrens academy

Hitkarini Sabha (Hindi: हितकारिणी सभा) is a historic, educational, non-profit organization located in the city of Jabalpur, Madhya Pradesh, India. It is runs some of the oldest academic institutions in the region. It was founded in 1868 by Raj Balwant Rao Kher, Diwan Biharilal Khajanchi and Shri Ambika Charan Banerjee.

Hitkarini Sabha was persuaded by Seth Govind Das to take a nationalist view. The students at Hitkarini Sabha institutions participated in the swaraj movement. Hitkarini Sabha has played a significant role in development of Hindi language. In a meeting in 1871, the Hitkarini Sabha met to discuss the question of court language. It was decided by an 8 to 2 margin that Hindi is more suitable than Urdu. It published a literary magazine for a while and organized meetings of leading Hindi authors. Seth Govind Das was associated with Hitkarini Sabha as a trustee and members of his family continue to serve the organization.

Many distinguished scholars, authors and politicians, such as Ravishankar Shukla, Captain B P Tiwari, Kunji Lal Dubey, Osho Rajnish, Maharshi Mahesh Yogi, Gajanan Madhav Muktibodh have emerged from institutions run by the Hitkarini Sabha or have been closely associated with Hitkarini Sabha as visiting lecturers sharing their knowledge and wisdom. It used to be involved in literary activities also. A function in the honor of Nirala was organized by Subhadra Kumari Chauhan in 1943-44.

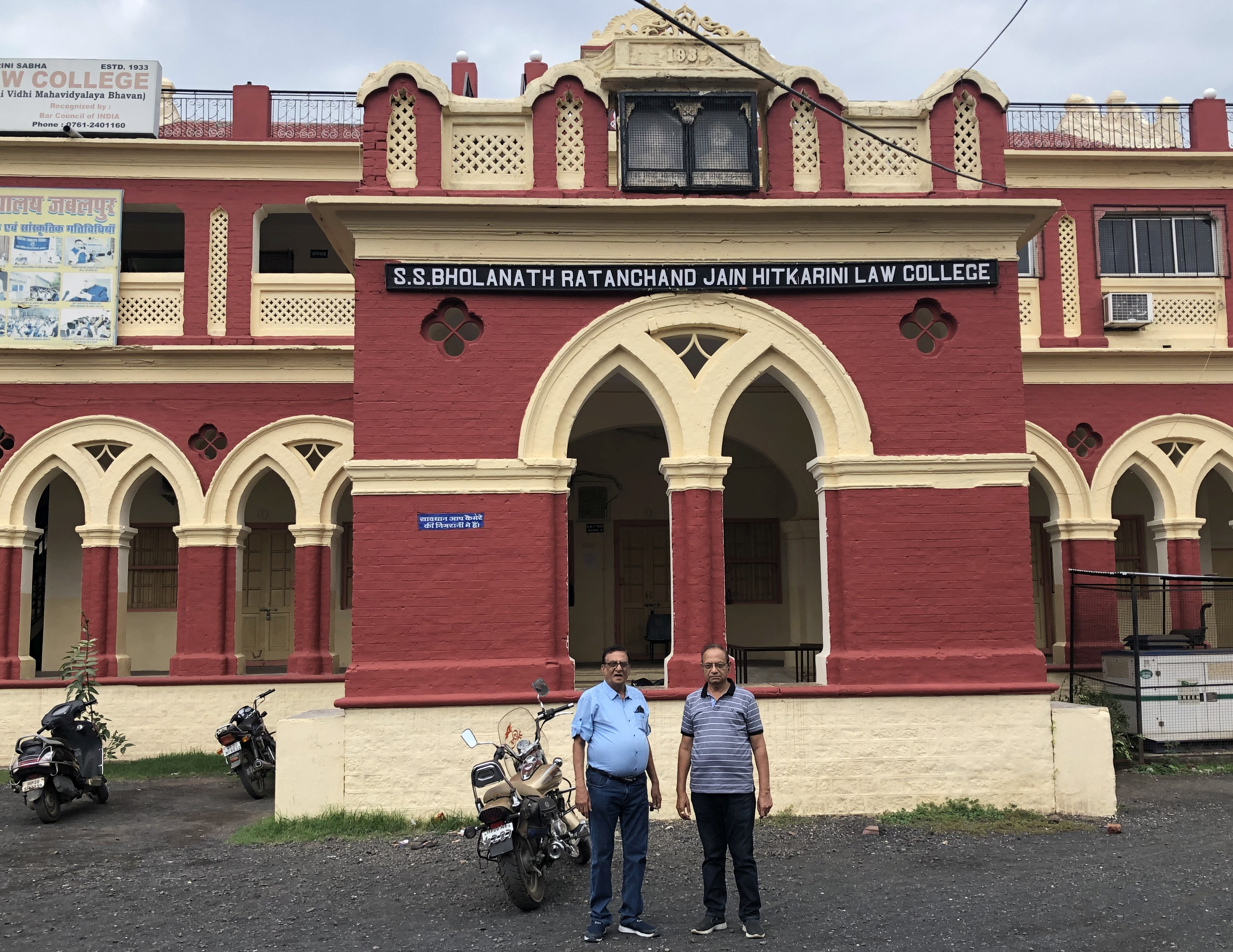
Hitkarini Law College with busts of Sawai Singhai Bholanath and Ratanchand Jain

Its earliest institutions were started in buildings donated by Savai Singhai Bholanath in the memory of his son Kasturchand, who also helped build the Hanumantal Bada Jain Mandir:

- Kasturchand Hitkarini Sanskrit Pathshala, Jabalpur 1870
- Kasturchand Hitkarini Higher Secondary School, Jonesganj, Jabalpur 1871

In the 1930s and 70s it added:

- Hitkarini City College (now Hitkarini Mahila Mahavidyalaya) 1933
- Hitkarini Law College 1934. It is the oldest Law College of Madhya Pradesh.
- Babu Manmohandas Hitkarini Girls Higher Secondary School, Dixitpura, Jabalpur 1934
- Hitkarini Higher Secondary School, Devtal Garha, Jabalpur 1944
- Hitkarini Higher Secondary School, Govind Ganj, Jabalpur 1948
- Hitkarini Higher Secondary School, Gorakhpur, Jabalpur 1958
- Hitkarini Chaatravas (Hostel), Jabalpur 1958
- Hitkarini Prashikshan (B.Ed.) Mahila Mahavidyalaya, Jabalpur 1969
- Hitkarini Girls Higher Secondary School, BT Bangla, Garha, Jabalpur 1977

It has expanded significantly with a number of institutions added since the 1980s. In the recent decades it has focused on professional institutions.

- Hitkarini Higher Secondary School, Sahajpur, Jabalpur 1981
- Hitkarini Computer Center, Jabalpur 1984
- Hitkarini Girls Primary School, Garha, Jabalpur 1987
- Hitkarini Primary School, Garha, Jabalpur 1988
- Hitkarini Primary School, Gorakhpur, Jabalpur 1988
- Hitkarini Science Commerce & Arts College, Jabalpur 1993
- Hitkarini College of Engineering & Technology, Jabalpur 1997
- Hitkarini College of Computer Applications, Jabalpur 2000
- Hitkarini Institute of Nursing Science & Research, 2000
- Babu Manmohandas Hitkarini Girls Primary School, Dixitpura, Jabalpur 2002
- Hitkarini Dental College & Hospital, Jabalpur 2004
- Hitkarini Children's Academy, Govind Ganj, Jabalpur 2008
- Hitkarini College of Architecture & Town Planning, Jabalpur 2009
- Babu Manmohandas Children's Academy, Dixitpura, Jabalpur 2010

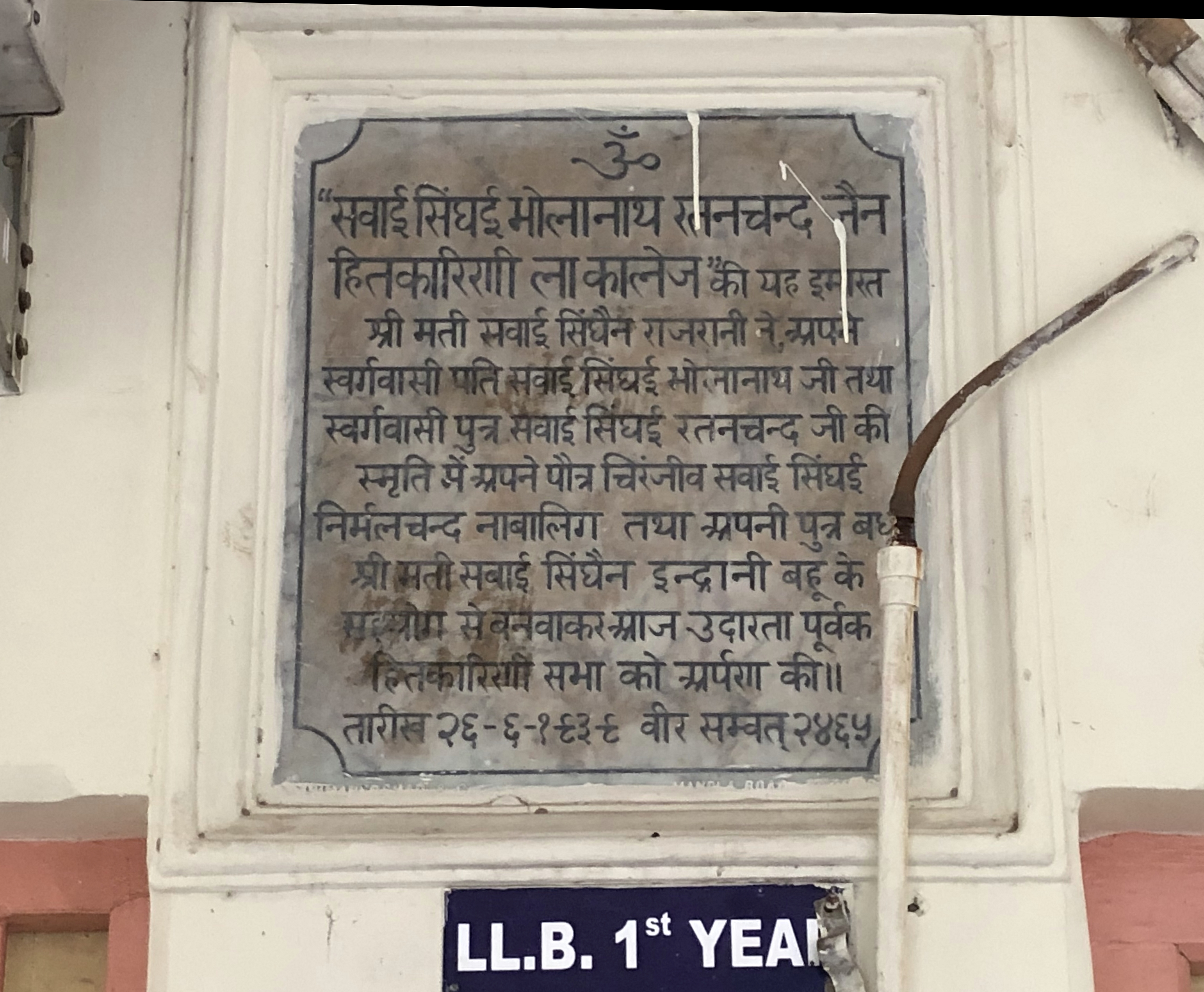
Hitakarini Law College Jabalpur Dedication, 1939

Hitkarini Sabha is now runs 8 colleges, 18 schools, and a computer center, with more than 13,000 students, employing more than 1000 teachers and staff. It owns several properties in Jabalpur.

It celebrated its 150th anniversary in 2017.

== See also ==
- Hitkarini College of Engineering & Technology
- Hanumantal Bada Jain Mandir
