= Princess Shōshi =

Princess Shōshi may refer to:

- Princess Shōshi (1027–1105) (章子内親王), wife of Emperor Go-Reizei
- Princess Shōshi (1137–1211) (暲子内親王), daughter of Emperor Toba
- Princess Shōshi (1195–1211) (昇子内親王), mother-in-law of Emperor Juntoku
- Princess Shōshi (1286–1348) (奨子内親王), daughter of Emperor Go-Uda
