= Monica Das =

Indian economist

- Monica Das in 2018
- Born: 1950 (age 75–76)

Academic work
- Discipline: Feminist economics
- Institutions: Gargi College

Dr. Monica Das is Associate Professor in Economics at Gargi College and a fellow at the Developing Countries Research Centre, University of Delhi, India. Her field of interest is feminist economics. She is a member of IAFFE (International Association for Feminist Economics), based in Washington DC. She is the author of Her Story So Far: Tales of the Girl Child in India and The Other Woman, an edited volume which draws attention to the issue of the socio-economic impact of underage marriage, bigamy and polygamy on the Human Development Index and Gender-related Development Index. She is the great-granddaughter of Oriya writer Fakir Mohan Senapati.

She has recently been a commissioned author for IDEA (International Institute for Democracy and Electoral Assistance) which is an Inter-governmental Organisation of the European Union, Sweden. Her analytical paper is on "The EU’s Contribution to Women’s Rights and Women’s Inclusion: Aspects of Democracy Building in South Asia, with special reference to India".

She has produced and directed a film on Fakir Mohan Senapati a leading literary light of Indian literature and considered a pioneer in fiction writing on social realism. This film ‘Anwesan’ was sponsored by Prasar Bharti and is now available in DVD form with the Doordarshan Archives. She has also written numerous articles on Indian art, culture and heritage published in various magazines.

== Filmography ==
- Anwesan (film on Fakir Mohan Senapati)

== Selected bibliography ==
=== Books ===
- Das, Monica (2003). Her story so far: tales of the girl child in India. New Delhi New York, NY: Penguin Books. ISBN 9780143030423.
- Das, Monica (2014). The other woman: 16 tales of love and deception. India: HarperCollins. ISBN 9789351160557.

=== Papers ===
- Das, Monica (15 November 2009), "The EU's contribution to women's rights and women's inclusion: Aspects of democracy building in South Asia, with special reference to India", The EU's Contribution to Women's Rights and Women's Inclusion: Aspects of Democracy Building in South Asia, with special reference to India | Analysis and Policy | International IDEA, Sweden: International Institute for Democracy and Electoral Assistance - IDEA, archived from the original on 3 March 2016
