= Defence Analytical Services and Advice =

Part of the British Ministry of Defence

Defence Analytical Services and Advice (DASA) was a statistical and economic unit within the MoD, initially created in 1992 from various statistics branches within the Ministry of Defence (MoD), as the Defence Analytical Services Agency. DASA was initially an executive agency of the MoD but lost its agency status on 1 April 2008, becoming an administrative unit within the MOD, changing its name to Defence Analytical Services and Advice, retaining the acronym DASA. On 1 April 2013, DASA was split into two separate units within the MoD; Defence Economics and Defence Statistics.

The role of DASA was to compile staffing, financial and logistical statistics to provide professional analytical, economic and statistical services and advice to the MoD, Parliament, Ministers, Senior MoD Officials and other government departments, mainly through its publication of Defence related National Statistics Publications and responses to Parliamentary Questions and ad hoc queries. DASA also provided planning and forecasting models to the British Armed Services to help to inform their decisions. In addition to this, DASA was also responsible for providing members of the public with defence related statistics through the Freedom of Information Act 2000.

DASA employed a mixture of statisticians, economists, IT specialists, other analysts and specialists, and administrative staff.

DASA was part of both the Government Statistical Service and the Government Economic Service. As such, DASA Directors were usually the heads of profession for statistics and economics for the MOD.

DASA had offices in six areas: the two largest were in London and Bath, with smaller offices at MoD Abbey Wood in Bristol. DASA also had personnel co-located with each of the three Armed Services at RAF High Wycombe with HQ Air Command for the RAF, HMS Excellent, Portsmouth with the Navy Command Headquarters for the Royal Navy and Andover with Army Headquarters for the British Army.

Its former Director (previous to that Chief Executive) whilst DASA was still an Agency was Dr Mike McDowall, BSc, PhD. DASA was headed by Dr Prabhat Vaze until late 2012.
