= Dass =

Dass may refer to:

== People ==
=== Given name ===
- Dass Gregory Kolopis (born 1977), former Malaysian football player

=== Surname ===
- Anuj Dass (born 1974), Indian cricketer
- Baba Dharam Dass, ancestor worshiped by Jains in Pasrur, Pakistan
- Baba Hari Dass (1923−2018), Indian monk
- Constance Prem Nath Dass (1886−1971), Indian college administrator
- Dean Dass, English cricketer
- Nathaniel Dass, English actor and musician
- Petter Dass (1647−1707), Norwegian poet
- Ram Dass (1931–2019), American contemporary spiritual teacher and former Harvard professor of psychology
- ShakthiDass (born 1948), Indian painter
- Shelly Dass, news anchor in the Republic of Trinidad and Tobago
- Secundra Dass, character in Robert Louis Stevenson's The Master of Ballantrae

== Places ==
- Dass, Nigeria, Local Government Area of Bauchi State in Nigeria
  - Dass language, Afro-Asiatic language spoken in Nigeria
- Kari Dass, a village, India

== Acronym ==
DASS may also stand for:

- Digital Access Signalling System, defunct means of providing Integrated Services Digital Network throughout the United Kingdom
  - Digital Access Signalling System 1 (DASS1)
  - Digital Access Signalling System 2 (DASS2)
- Depression Anxiety Stress Scale, a screening for depression and anxiety
- Dialysis-associated Steal Syndrome (DASS), an infrequent complication of dialysis accesses
- Defensive Aid Sub-System, of aircraft
- Dacca American Society School
- Distress Alerting Satellite System, a search and rescue satellite system

== See also ==
- Das (disambiguation)
- Dasa (disambiguation)
- Daas (disambiguation)
