= Mohini Mohan Das =

Indian politician

- Born: 14 August 1886; Chandsi, Barisal district, Bengal Presidency, British India
- Died: 27 November 1949 (aged 63); Calcutta, West Bengal, India
- Occupations: Politician and Activist
- Political party: Indian National Congress, Swaraj Party
- Spouse(s): Sutrishna Das (m.1909), Sonomani Das (m.1923)
- Children: 2 sons, 2 daughters

Mohini Mohan Das (1886–1949) was an Indian politician, writer and activist from West Bengal.

== Personal life ==
Mohini Mohan Das was born into Namasudra family at Chandsi, Barisal district, Bengal Presidency (now Bangladesh). His father Padma Lochan Das, was also a medical practitioner and brother Dr. Keshab Chandra Das was also a political leader and rights activist. Das completed his matriculation at Goila School at Barisal and later started doing social services.

== Political career ==
Das preached against beef-eating, superstitions, idol worship, child marriage, untouchability and casteism. He led the Temple Entry Satyagraha at Kali temple in Dhaka in the year 1930. He was arrested along with his wife, Sonomoni Das, some colleagues and was released later. He also supported a separate electorate for untouchables.

He joined Congress and later became part of Swaraj Party which was founded by Chittaranjan Das in 1923. He became member of Bengal Legislative Council from Faridpur constituency in 1924 and served till 1931 defeating Dr. Charu Chandra Das.

== Literary career ==
He was associated with Bengali literary field and wrote "Pashan Putra" and a book of poems, 'Pathayar'. He started a monthly, "Sadhak" in 1923 for the unity and emancipation of Dalits. He wrote many articles in Amrit Bazar Patrika and Bongwani.
