= Atulananda Das =

Indian botanist (1879-1952)

Atulananda Das (1879–1952) was an Indian botanist and forester noted for working for the Assam region of the Indian Forestry Service and describing species in the families Ericaceae, Ebenaceae, Dipterocarpaceae, Myrtaceae, Euphorbiaceae, Helwingiaceae, Flacourtiaceae, Lauraceae, Acanthaceae, Fagaceae, and Symplocaceae. In 1935 he was elected a Fellow of the Linnean Society of London.

== Species described ==
- Agapetes kanjilali Das (1935).
- Agapetes racemosa Watt ex Kanjilal & Das (1939).
- Dipterocarpus mannii King ex U.N.Kanj., P.C.Kanjilal & Das (1934).
- Eugenia cyanophylla P.C.Kanjilal & Das (1937).
- Flueggeopsis glauca (Wall. ex Hook.f.) Das (1940).
- Helwingia lanceolata Watt ex Kanjilal, P.C.Kanjilal & Das (1938).
- Homalium ciliatum Debb. ex Kanjilal, P.C.Kanjilal, Das & Purkayastha (1937).
- Maba cacharensis Das & P.C.Kanjilal (1934).
- Machilus dubia Das & P.C.Kanjilal (1937).
- Machilus globosa Das (1937).
- Mackaya atroviridis (T.Anderson) Das (1939).
- Mackaya macrocarpa (Nees) Das (1939).
- Mackaya neesiana (Wall.) Das(1939).
- Neopeltandra macropus (Hook.f.) Das(1940).
- Pasania milroyii (Purkayastha) Das (1940).
- Phoebe cooperiana P.C.Kanjilal & Das (1937).
- Reidia tetrandra (Roxb.) Das(1940).
- Symplocos pealii King ex Das (1934).
- Syzygium cyanophyllum (P.C.Kanjilal & Das) Raizada (1948).
- Taxillus assamicus Danser ex Das (1940).

== Works ==
- Indian Forester lxxiv. 336 (1948).
- Flora of Assam iv. p. (viii) (1940).
- Assam Forest Rec., Bot. i. 19 (1934).
