= Seth Govind Das =

Indian politician (1896–1974)

Seth Govind Das Kaka Sahib

Member of Parliament for Jabalpur
- In office 1951–1974
- Preceded by: Sushil Kumar Pateriya
- Succeeded by: Sharad Yadav

Personal details
- Born: 16 October 1896
- Died: 18 June 1974 (aged 77) Bombay, Maharashtra, India
- Party: Indian National Congress
- Spouse: Godavari bai
- Children: 2 Sons Jagmohandas, Manmohandas & 2 Daughters Ratna Kumari, Padma
- Parents: Jeevan Das (father); Parvati Bai (mother)
- Relatives: Gokuldas Malpani (grandfather)
- Education: Rani Durgavati University, Jabalpur
- Profession: Politician, Author
- Website: http://www.gokuldas.com/sg/
- As of 26 June, 2016 Source: ["Biography". Lok Sabha.]

Seth Govind Das (16 October 1896 – 18 June 1974) was an Indian independence activist and parliamentarian. He belonged to the Maheshwari merchant family of Raja Gokuldas of Jabalpur. The family began as the banking firm of Sevaram Khushalchand, one of the "great firms" as termed by T.A. Timberg.

Although born in a family with a history of loyalty to the British government, he was attracted to the movement to seek India's freedom from the British rule. He joined the Non Co-operation Movement led by Mahatma Gandhi in 1920 and was jailed five times for a total of eight years. He became a member of the All India Congress Committee since 1920 and served in the Congress Working Committee of the Tripuri Session of the Congress in 1939. He was the President of the Mahakoshal P.C.C. during 1928–1934 and 1946–1957, and the Madhya Pradesh Congress Committee in 1957.

Das was also a Hindi author and supported Hindi as the national language of India. He was jailed in Damoh for eight months by British, where he wrote four plays 'Prakash' (social), 'Kartavya' (mythological), 'Navras' (philosophical) and a 'Spardha'(one act play). He wrote more than a hundred plays, a novel "Indu-mati", five travel books, a three volume autobiography, four biographies, mostly in Hindi.

He represented Jabalpur in the Indian Parliament from the first to the fifth Lok Sabha, continuously, from 1957 to 1974 when he died. He was appointed Speaker pro tem (prior to the formal election of a speaker) by the President for the Second, Third, Fourth and Fifth Lok Sabha and administered the oath of the office to all the rest of the Lok Sabha members.

The Government of India awarded him the civilian honour of the Padma Bhushan in 1961.

== Family ==
Govind Das was married to Godavari Bai of Sikar Rajasthan in 1908 when he was 12 while his wife was 10. They had two sons, Manmohan Das and Jagmohan Das, and daughters Ratna Kumari Bai and Padma. Mamohan Das and his son Chandra Mohan continued to be active in politics. Ravi Mohan, son of Jagmohan Das is an industrialist in Indore region.

His sister was Rajkumari Bai. The property that later came to be known as the Royal Hotel, was gifted to her by her grandfather Raja Gokuldas.

== See also ==
- Marwari people
- Hitkarini S
