= Defence and Security Accelerator =

UK defence research funding body

Agency overview
- Formed: 2016
- Jurisdiction: United Kingdom
- Headquarters: Porton Down, Wiltshire
- Agency executive: Anita Friend, Head
- Parent agency: Ministry of Defence
- Website: Official website

The Defence and Security Accelerator (DASA) is a branch of the UK's Ministry of Defence that funds external development of innovative (often dual use) technologies for the British Armed Forces. It is headquartered in Porton Down, with a hub in White City, London. Research projects it has offered funding for include human enhancement, autonomous weapons and surveillance.
