= Mini Das =

Indian-American image processing researcher

Mini Das is an Indian and American interdisciplinary applied physicist and engineer specializing in image processing, with applications in biology, medicine, and materials science. She is a Moores Professor at the University of Houston, with appointments in the departments of physics, biomedical engineering, and electrical and computer engineering.

== Education and career ==
Das has a 1998 master's degree in optoelectronics and lasers from the Cochin University of Science and Technology in India. She completed a Ph.D. in 2003 at IIT Delhi, with a dissertation on inverse scattering transforms that also involved work as a visiting researcher at Bell Labs.

She became a postdoctoral researcher at the University of Connecticut, and then beginning in at the UMass Chan Medical School in Worcester, Massachusetts. She obtained a regular-rank assistant professorship in radiology at UMass in 2010, before moving to the University of Houston as an assistant professor in 2011.

== Recognition ==
Das was named as a Fellow of SPIE in 2022, and as a 2026 Fellow of Optica. Her Optica fellowship honored her "for pioneering contributions to low-coherence X-ray phase retrieval, imaging system development, spectral X-ray computed tomography, and image perception".
