= Gobindachandra Das =

Bengali poet

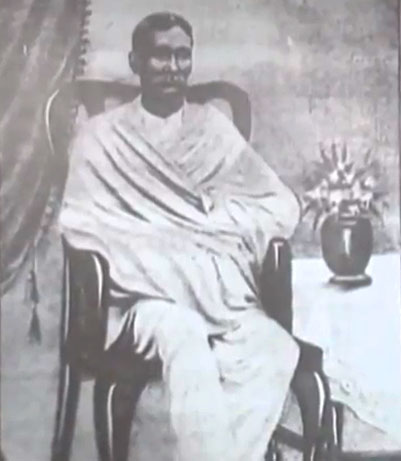
- Poet by nature Gobindrachandra Das
- Born: Gobindachandra Das; January 16, 1855; Dhaka District, Bengal Province, British India
- Died: October 1, 1918 (aged 63); Dhaka, Bengal Province, British India
- Occupation: poet
- Children: 3

Gobindachandra Das (Bengali: গোবিন্দচন্দ্র দাস) (1855–1918), was a Bengali poet and writer.

== Life ==
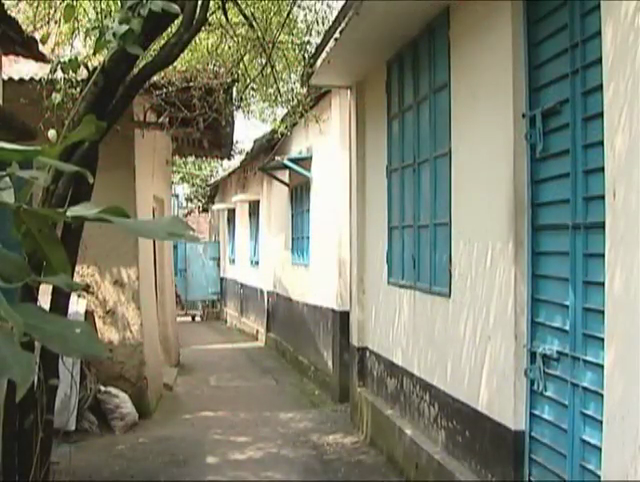
The house where Gobinda Chandra Das was born

Das was born in Gazipur of Bengal province. He was a very poor man and could not continue study. He was an employee of the Bhawal Estate. He had two daughters and a son. The younger one was named Bhaktimoyi who later was married to Haripada Bhowmik and was the mother of three children. Her son was Dilip Bhowmik(1948–1998). In the last part of his life, Das was in very poor health.

== Works ==
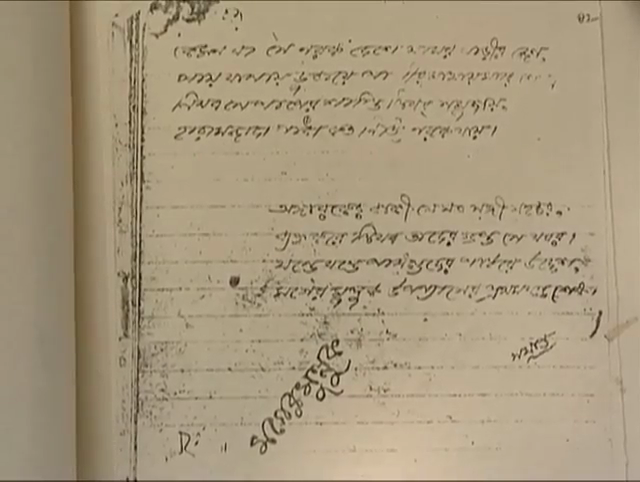
Excerpt from one of the poet's greatest works "Moger Muluk".

Gobindachandra Das was a 'Swavabkobi', 'A poet by nature'.

His literary works were included in the curriculum of school level, secondary and higher secondary Bengali literature in Bangladesh.

Some works

- Kunkum
- Kastury
- Prem O Ful
- Boijointi
- Moger Muluk
