= Daxi =

Daxi may refer to:

== Mainland China ==
- Daxi (大西) dynasty, a short-lived dynasty (1643–1646) established by Zhang Xianzhong
- Daxi Creek (大溪), tributary of the Xitiao River in Anji County, Zhejiang
- Daxi culture (5000 BC–3000 BC), Neolithic culture centered in the Three Gorges region, around the middle Yangtze River
- Daxi, Youyang County, town in Youyang Tujia and Miao Autonomous County, Chongqing
- Daxi, Pinghe County, town in Pinghe County, Fujian
- Daxi, Jiexi County, town in Jiexi County, Guangdong
- Daxi, Jianghua Yao County, a town in Jianghua Yao Autonomous County, Hunan
- Daxi, Wenling, town in Wenling, Zhejiang
- Datong–Xi'an Passenger Railway

== Taiwan ==
- Daxi District, district in Taoyuan, Taiwan
- Daxi Station, railway station in Yilan County, Taiwan, Republic of China
