= Danish Aviation Systems =

Danish UAV supplier

Danish Aviation Systems ApS.
- Company type: Private
- Genre: Aviation
- Founded: 2009
- Headquarters: Roskilde, Denmark
- Key people: Steven Friberg (CEO)
- Products: unmanned aerial vehicles, Research and development
- Website: Danish Aviation Systems official website

Danish Aviation Systems is a Danish supplier and developer of unmanned aerial vehicles.
