= Moumita Das =

Indian physicist

- Education: Jadavpur University; Indian Institute of Science; Harvard University; University of California, Los Angeles; Vrije Universiteit Amsterdam
- Scientific career
- Fields: Physics, Mathematics
- Workplaces: Syracuse University; Rochester Institute of Technology
- Doctoral advisor: Sriram Ramaswamy

Moumita Das is an Indian-American physicist specializing in soft matter and statistical mechanics research. She is a professor at the Rochester Institute of Technology.

== Life ==
Das earned a B.S. and M.S. from Jadavpur University. She received a Ph.D. in physics from the Indian Institute of Science in 2005. Her dissertation was titled, Ordering, Stochasticity, and Rheology in Sheared and Confined Complex Fluids. Sriram Ramaswamy was her dissertation supervisor. From 2004 to 2005, she was a postdoctoral fellow at the Harvard John A. Paulson School of Engineering and Applied Sciences working under mentor Lakshminarayanan Mahadevan. She was a postdoctoral fellow in the department of chemistry and biochemistry at the University of California, Los Angeles under Alex J. Levine from 2005 to 2006. From 2007 to 2011, Das researched as a VENI fellow at the school of physics and astronomy at the Vrije Universiteit Amsterdam with Frederick C. MacKintosh.

Das joined Syracuse University as a senior scientist in the department of physics in 2011. She researches soft matter and statistical mechanics. In 2012, she became an assistant professor of physics and astronomy at the Rochester Institute of Technology. Das was promoted to associate professor in 2018 and professor in 2023. In 2024, she was elected a fellow of the American Physical Society.
