= Radha Charan Das =

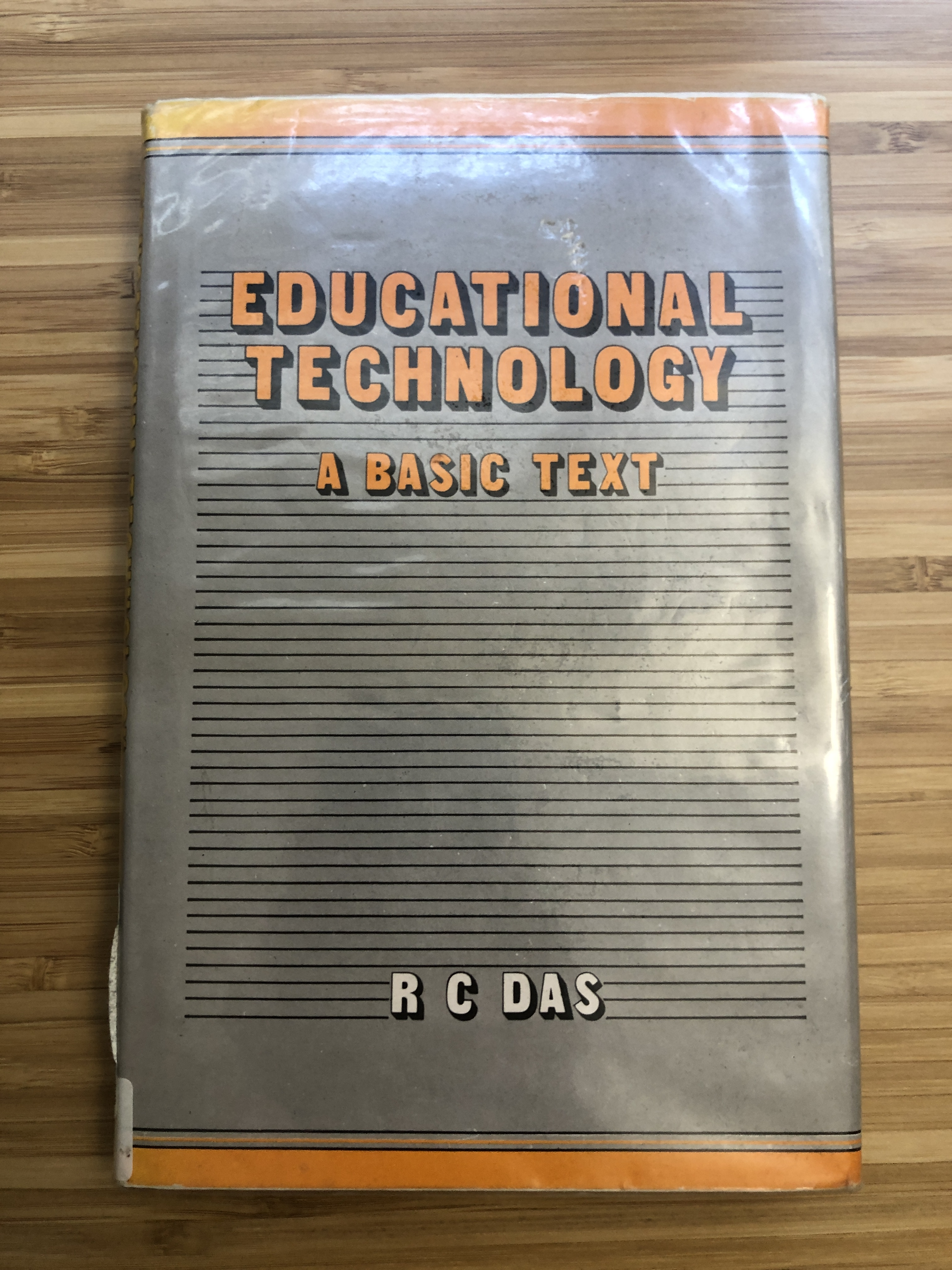
Dr Radha Charan Das, Educational Technology – A Basic Text book cover (front)

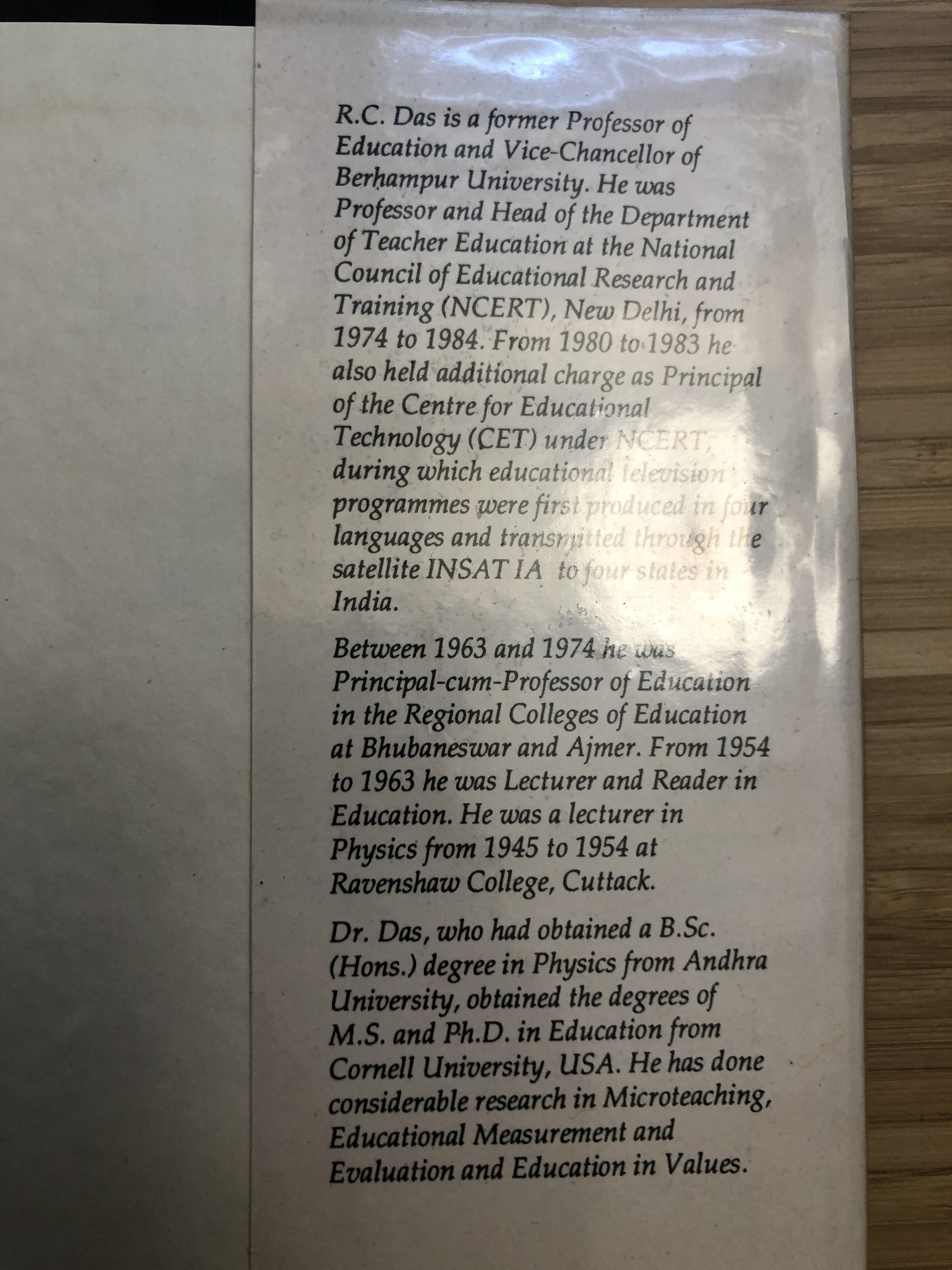
Dr Radha Charan Das, Educational Technology – A Basic Text book sleeve (back)

Radha Charan Das, often known as Dr. R. C. Das, was the Professor of Education and Vice-Chancellor of Berhampur University. He is the author of the book Educational Technology : A Basic Text. He was Dean, Professor and Head of the Department of Teacher Education at the National Council of Educational Research and Training from 1974 to 1984. From 1980 to 1983, he also held additional charge as Principal of the Centre for Educational Technology(CET) under National Council of Educational Research and Training during which educational television programmes were first produced in four languages and transmitted through the satellite INSAT 1A to four states in India. Between 1963 and 1974, he was Principal and Professor of Education in the Regional Colleges of Education at Bhubaneswar and Ajmer. From 1954 to 1963, he was Lecturer and Reader in Education. He was a lecturer in Physics from 1945 to 1954 at Ravenshaw College, Cuttack. Dr. Radha Charan Das obtained a BSc (Hons) degree in Physics from Andhra University and later earned an M.S. and PhD in Education from Cornell University. His doctoral dissertation was titled *An analytical study of electrical curricula in selected technical institutes of northeastern United States* (1950), officially listed in the Cornell ILR School Theses and Dissertations catalog.. He has done considerable research in Microteaching, Educational Measurement and Evaluation and Education in Values.

Das was an Indian educator, author, and scholar who wrote the book "Introduction to Educational Technology", which was published by Sterling Publishers Private Limited in 1993. Das was a leading expert in the field of educational technology, and his book is widely regarded as a seminal work on the subject.

Das's book "Introduction to Educational Technology" provides a comprehensive overview of the field of educational technology, covering topics such as the history of educational technology, the role of computers in education, the use of multimedia in teaching and learning, and the design and development of instructional materials. The book also explores the social, cultural, and ethical issues surrounding the use of technology in education.

Das was a professor at the Regional Institute of Education in Bhubaneswar, India, and had a deep understanding of the Indian education system. His book reflects this understanding and provides insights into the specific challenges and opportunities facing Indian educators in the field of educational technology.

Das's "Introduction to Educational Technology" is a resource for educators, researchers, and students interested in the field of educational technology. It remains a relevant and influential work to this date.
