= Das Island =

Emirati island in the Persian Gulf

Native name: جزيرة داس (Arabic)
- Location within United Arab Emirates Location within Persian Gulf

Geography
- Location: Persian Gulf
- Coordinates: 25°09′05″N 52°52′25″E

Administration
- United Arab Emirates
- Emirate: Abu Dhabi

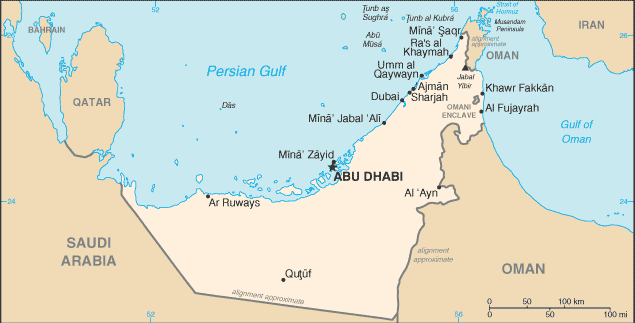
Das which is named on this map can be seen to the left of the center of this image of the UAE

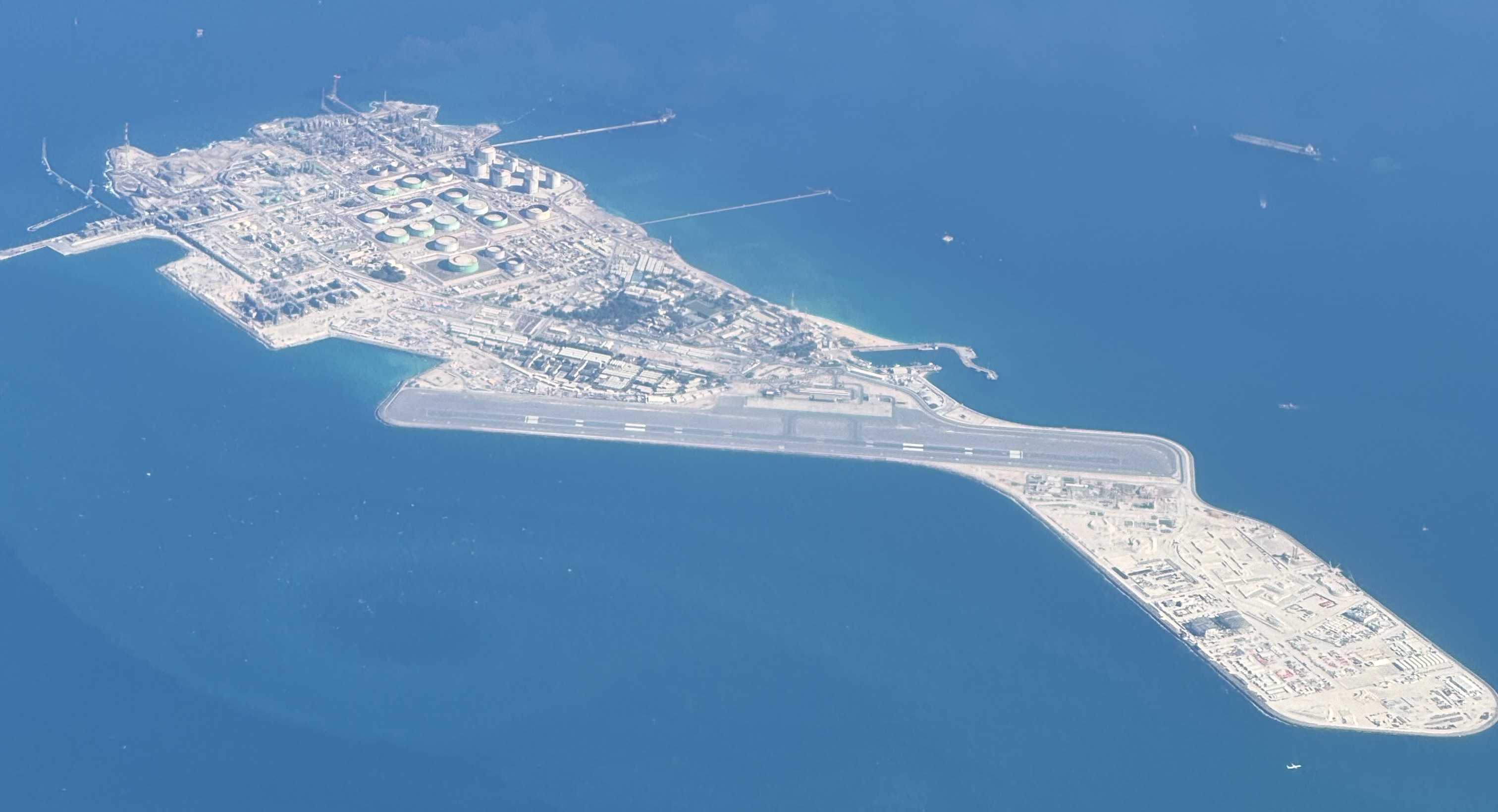
An aerial view of Das Island

Das Island (Arabic: جزيرة داس) is an Emirati island in the Persian Gulf. It lies about 100 miles (160 km) north-west of the UAE mainland; Qatar is also close by. It covers approximately 0.75 miles (1.21 km) by 1.5 miles (2.4 km), and was almost rectangular in shape, but was significantly expanded to the south by artificial additions for a new runway and new accommodation in 2016.

Das Island is inhabited by about 6,000 oil and gas industry personnel on a rotational schedule. It exports crude oil and liquefied natural gas by tankers as far as Japan and Europe. Oil production began after prospecting during 1956-1960 by Abu Dhabi Marine Areas (ADMA), a joint venture between BP and Compagnie Française des Pétroles (later known as Total). Local exporting companies now all fall under the Abu Dhabi National Oil Company (ADNOC) brand, including ADNOC Offshore (Oil), ADNOC LNG (LNG) and other companies. Das Island airport is the only airport on the island, and the runway was expanded and relocated in 2018.

Das Island is a noted breeding site for turtles and seabirds. Despite oil and gas production, turtles still feed safely in the area and Das Island has remained an important landfall for migrant animals.

== History ==
On 22 November 1976, a Gulf Air Short SC.7 Skyvan cargo plane travelling from Bahrain to Abu Dhabi-Al Bateen Airport experienced an engine failure. There were no passengers on board. The crew abandoned the aircraft off Das Island. The two occupants were rescued while the plane sank.

== Climate ==
Climate data for Das Island (2004–2014)
Month	Jan	Feb	Mar	Apr	May	Jun	Jul	Aug	Sep	Oct	Nov	Dec	Year
Record high °C (°F)	26.4 (79.5)	29.3 (84.7)	33.7 (92.7)	36.9 (98.4)	42.5 (108.5)	43.6 (110.5)	44.0 (111.2)	44.6 (112.3)	40.7 (105.3)	37.6 (99.7)	35.1 (95.2)	28.9 (84.0)	44.6 (112.3)
Mean daily maximum °C (°F)	21.8 (71.2)	22.6 (72.7)	25.2 (77.4)	29.3 (84.7)	34.0 (93.2)	35.5 (95.9)	37.2 (99.0)	38.0 (100.4)	36.8 (98.2)	34.0 (93.2)	29.3 (84.7)	24.2 (75.6)	30.7 (87.2)
Daily mean °C (°F)	19.8 (67.6)	20.1 (68.2)	22.3 (72.1)	26.1 (79.0)	30.4 (86.7)	32.2 (90.0)	34.0 (93.2)	34.7 (94.5)	33.7 (92.7)	31.2 (88.2)	27.1 (80.8)	22.3 (72.1)	27.8 (82.1)
Mean daily minimum °C (°F)	17.9 (64.2)	18.1 (64.6)	20.0 (68.0)	23.5 (74.3)	27.5 (81.5)	29.6 (85.3)	31.6 (88.9)	32.3 (90.1)	31.3 (88.3)	28.9 (84.0)	25.0 (77.0)	20.4 (68.7)	25.5 (77.9)
Record low °C (°F)	12.0 (53.6)	13.7 (56.7)	15.2 (59.4)	17.3 (63.1)	22.4 (72.3)	26.1 (79.0)	28.9 (84.0)	29.2 (84.6)	27.5 (81.5)	23.5 (74.3)	19.6 (67.3)	13.9 (57.0)	12.0 (53.6)
Average rainfall mm (inches)	10.7 (0.42)	2.2 (0.09)	2.2 (0.09)	2.4 (0.09)	0.0 (0.0)	0.0 (0.0)	0.0 (0.0)	0.0 (0.0)	0.0 (0.0)	0.0 (0.0)	2.9 (0.11)	11.2 (0.44)	31.6 (1.24)
Average relative humidity (%)	70	76	76	72	69	72	72	76	72	67	65	69	71
Source: National Center of Meteorology
