= Donor-specific antibody =

Concept in transplantation medicine

Donor-specific antibodies (DSA) are a concept in transplantation medicine and describe the presence of antibodies specific to the organ donor's human leukocyte antigen (HLA) molecules. These antibodies can cause antibody-mediated rejection and are therefore considered a contraindication against transplantation in most cases. DSA are a result of B cell and plasma cell activation and bind to HLA] and/or non-HLA molecules on the endothelium of the graft. They were first described in 1969 by Patel et al., who found that transplant recipients who were positively tested for DSA using a complement-dependent cytotoxicity crossmatch assay had a higher risk of transplant rejection. DSA can either be pre-formed (e.g. by pregnancy, prior transplantation or blood transfusion) or can be formed as a response to the transplantion. (De novo DSA)

Almost a third of patients who are waitlisted for transplantation may have a degree of pre-formed DSA. Pre-formed antibodies increase the chances of immunological failure of the allograft by causing positive crossmatches and, thereby, result in the exclusion of donors. For patients with pre-formed DSA, successful transplantation can still be possible by employing strategies such as desensitisation, paired exchange and acceptable mismatching.

== Panel reactive antibody ==
The degree of cytotoxicity is expressed as percentage PRA (panel reactive antibody). It is a tool that can be employed to approximate the risk of a given recipient of having a positive crossmatch. This is to a likely organ donor taken from a similar population. The limitations of this method are that PRA percent can be different numerically without a corresponding change in the type or amount of antibody. This largely depends on the cell panel used which are commercially produced and may not truly represent the population. HLA frequencies and racial differences need to be factored in but cannot be done. Moreover, significant false positive results can be produced due to non-HLA antibodies, autoantibodies and nonspecific IgM antibodies. Similarly, false negative results are possible as this is purely complement dependent that requires higher antibody titres to be activated. The lack of a complement activation simply due to low titres allows a true antibody to be hidden.

== Cross-match test ==
Patel and Terasaki in 1969 demonstrated the efficacy of complement-dependent lymphocytotoxic cross-match in defining immunologic risk in renal transplantation. This became the standard method, still used today, for graft allocation. With PRA that identifies several antibodies to a potential cluster of donors, the crossmatch will identify if a recipient had antibodies to a specific donor of interest. It became clear with time that it did not identify all preexisting donor-specific HLA antibodies (HLA-DSA). In recent years, techniques for detection of HLA antibodies have become more sensitive with the introduction of solid-phase assays, including ELISA.
