= Shoshi Mukhi Das =

Indian missionary, teacher and nurse

- Born: 1868; Sylhet, Bengal Presidency, British India
- Died: August 1921 (aged 52–53); Sylhet, Bengal Presidency, British India
- Occupation(s): Calvinistic missionary, teacher and nurse
- Years active: 1870s-1921
- Employer: Welsh Calvinistic Methodist Church

Shoshi Mukhi Das (1868 – August 1921) was an Indian missionary of the Welsh Calvinistic Methodist Church, teacher and nurse.

== Early life and family ==
Das was born in Sylhet, Bengal Presidency, British India, in 1868. Her mother, Mary Das (née Grose), was raised in the orphanage of Welsh Calvinistic missionary William Pryse (1820–1869) and converted to Christianity. Her father Babu Gour Charan Das had worked for the Welsh Mission in India and the police force. There were seven children born to the family, including her sister Shushila Das (1870–1924).

In 1891, Das' sister Shusila's fiancé was arrested during conflict in Manipur in the course of the Anglo-Manipur War. He was executed by beheading without a trial.

== Missionary work ==
As teenagers, Das and her sister Shushila worked at the zenana mission Girls School. In 1891, Das began medical training in Calcutta.

In 1892, Das' father paid for her to travel to Britain to undertake formal medical training in Glasgow so that she would qualify for medical missionary work. In May 1893, the General Assembly of the Welsh Calvinistic Methodist Church accepted her into the service of the Welsh Mission. While in Britain, Das also gave public lectures about the history and culture of her country to Methodist audiences. She would wear a sari and sing hymns in Bengali.

Das returned to India in 1894. For her missionary work, Das taught in the morning as a schoolteacher, visited the zenanas in the afternoon and practiced medicine in the evenings. In 1896, her home in Karimganj burned down, then in 1897 an earthquake struck and malaria and cholera spread in the area of Sylhet. Das caught malaria, suffered from dysentery and developed rheumatism, was nursed by her sister Shushila until she could resume her missionary work. In 1904, Das wrote a report about the zenanas missionary work for the periodical The Friend of the Women of Bengal.

In 1913, Das was granted furlough from her missionary work due to ill health and travelled from Calcutta to Wales. During her furlough, Das lived at Oregon House in Aberystwyth, Ceredigion, received medical treatments at the Royal Infirmary, and gave talks to Welsh Methodists about her missionary work. She lived in Wales until February 1915. Das returned to India and resumed her missionary work in Sylhet until September 1918. She died in August 1921 in Sylhet.

== See also ==
- Christianity in India
