= List of Labanas =

This is a list of notable Labanas, a community originating in India.

== Early Sikh Labanas ==
- Bhai Mansukh – first Labana trader to preach Sikhism in Sri Lanka region
- Bhai Dasa Labana – Devout Sikh leader and preacher
- Baba Makhan Shah Labana – Preacher of Sikhism
- Nadu Shah Labana
- Baba Lakhi Shah Labana (Note: also served as the main contractor of Red Fort.)
- Baba Takhat Mall Labana

== Politicians ==
- Bibi Jagir Kaur – First woman to be elected as the president of the Shiromani Gurdwara Prabandhak Committee (SGPC)
- Sardar Darshan Singh - First Lubana Sikh elected as Chairman of Rural Development and Provincial Vice President of JKNC

== Athletes ==
- Gurindervir Singh – the current Indian national record holder for the 60 m and 100 m
