= Babu Karam Singh Bal =

Indian politician

- ਬਾਬੂ ਕਰਮ ਸਿੰਘ ਬੱਲ
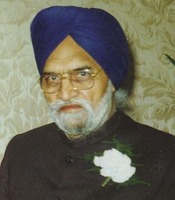
- Babu Karam Singh in 1989

Personal details
- Born: Karam Singh Bal c. 1927 Sathiala, Punjab, British India
- Died: 7 October 1992 (aged 66) Ludhiana, Punjab, India
- Party: Shiromani Akali Dal
- Spouse: Bibi Sawinder Kaur
- Profession: Sarpanch; Politician; Manager of Baba Bakala Sahib; Chairman of Sathiala College

Babu Karam Singh Bal (c. 1927 – 7 October 1992) was an Indian politician for the Shiromani Akali Dal party and the sarpanch for the town of Sathiala in Punjab, India. Bal was also the manager of Gurdwara Baba Bakala Sahib under the SGPC for 38 years.

Babu Karam Singh was also the chairman of Sathiala College and led various committees within the institution.

== Personal life ==
Karam Singh Bal was born to Sawan Singh and Tej Kaur around the year 1927 in Sathiala, Punjab, British India, into a Sikh family. He had three brothers and two sisters, out of which he was the third youngest. Despite being raised in Sathiala, Bal eventually relocated to Baba Bakala later on in life as he was appointed as the manager of Gurdwara Baba Bakala Sahib.

Babu Karam Singh had a wide range of interests including reading novels, current affairs and he was also an avid chess player. He also had a passion for writing classical poetry (mainly Ghazals).

== Education ==
Babu Karam Singh went to college in Lahore prior to the partition of India. Babu Karam Singh never pursued further education, as at the time universities were often distant and in large cities such as Delhi or Mumbai, thus being inaccessible.

== Politics ==
Throughout the entirety of his career, Babu Karam Singh was a member of the Shiromani Akali Dal party. Hence, Bal had many companions within the party such as Harchand Singh Longowal, Parkash Singh Badal, Gurcharan Singh Tohra and Jiwan Singh Umranangal. In the 1980s, Karam Singh was offered a seat to be an MLA for the Beas constituency, however he never went on to take part in the elections, yet he remained a prominent figure in the politics of the region.

== Philanthropy ==
Babu Karam Singh was also recognised for carrying out much charity work within the areas surrounding Baba Bakala. He gave many unemployed people places to work and also paid for the education of children whose parents could not afford to do so. He was overall a keen humanitarian.

== Memorial ==
In memory of Babu Karam Singh Bal, a pillar has been erected on Batala Road in Sathiala. It is built at the location where his funeral took place in 1992.

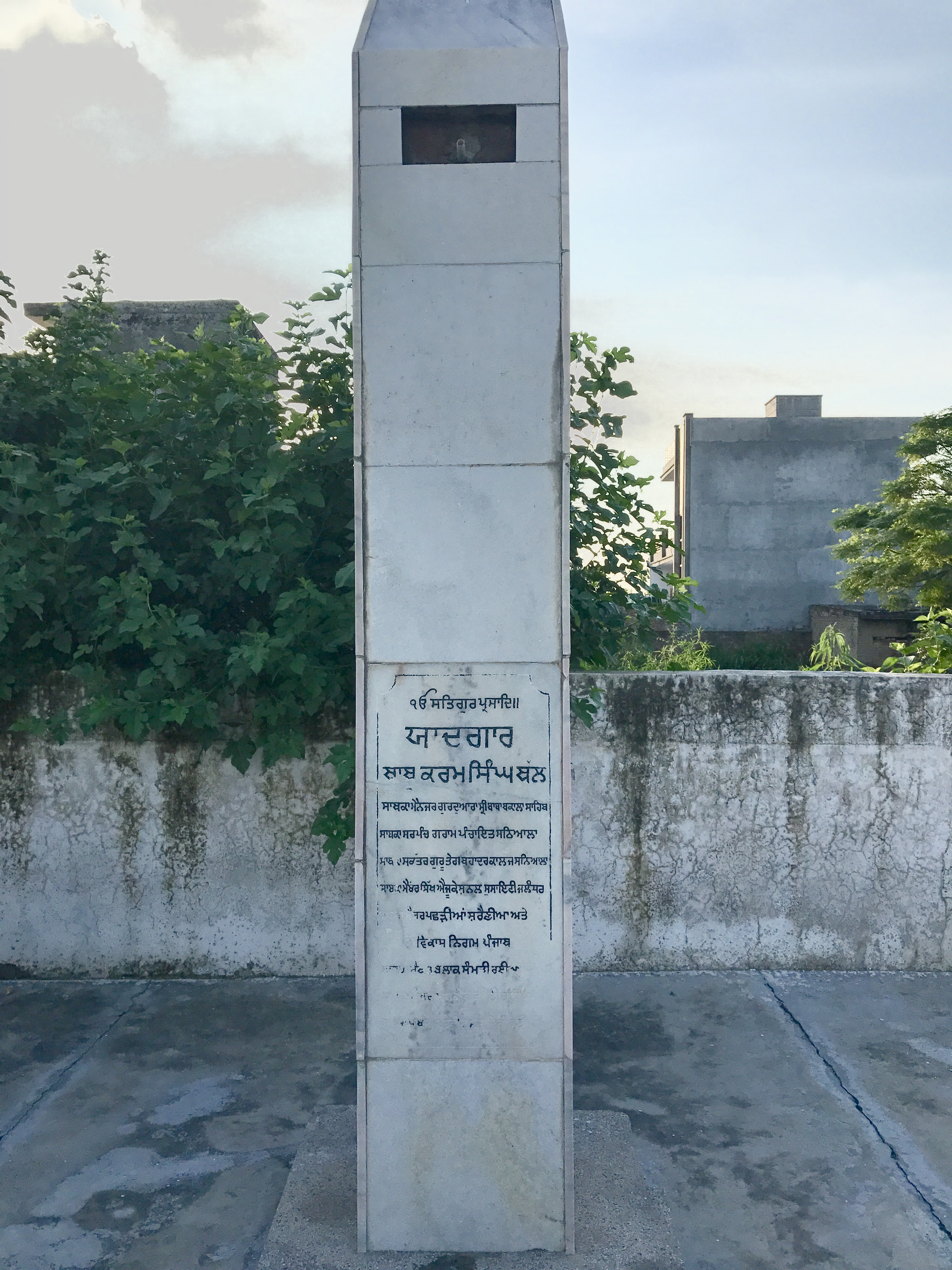
The memorial built in honour of Karam Singh
