= Lakhi Rai =

Lakhi Rai may refer to:

- Bhai Lakhi Rai Banjara, 17th-century trader from Delhi
- Lakhi Rai Jadhaun, ruler of Khairpur
