= Makhan Shah Labana =

Sikh preacher

Baba Makhan Shah Labana
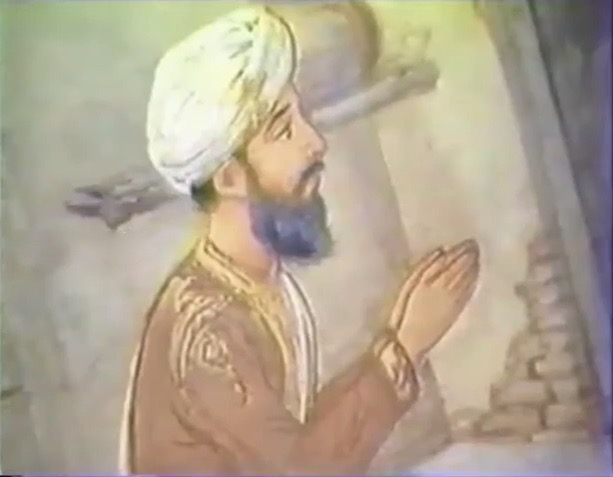
- Detail of Bhai Makhan Shah Labana, from a fresco depicting him finding Guru Tegh Bahadur from Gurdwara Baba Bakala

Personal life
- Born: 7 July 1619 (23 Ashad 1676 Bikarmi) Tanda, Jhelum District
- Died: 1674 Village Raja Harpal, Sialkot
- Spouse: Bibi Sital Devi (Suljai)
- Children: Lal Chand; Jawanda Shah; Kushal Chand; Chandu Lal
- Parent(s): Bhai Dasa (father); Vijay Devi (mother)
- Known for: Finding Guru Tegh Bahadur; Gave Jaikara (Slogan) Guru Lado Re
- Occupation: Merchant Marine

Religious life
- Religion: Sikhism

Makhan Shah Lubana (Punjabi pronunciation: [Makkhaṇa Śĝha Labĝṇĝ]; also written as Lobana; 7 July 1619 – 1674) was a devout Sikh and a rich trader of the Pelia clan from the Lobana tribe, who discovered the ninth Guru of the Sikhs, Guru Tegh Bahadar in Bakala, Punjab on 16 April 1664 A.D. (8 Visakh 1721 Bikrami). He is also noted for his other contributions like preaching Sikhism in West Punjab and abroad, punishing Dhir Mal and his masand Shihan for the attack and initial settlement of Guru Tegh Bahadur at Anandpur Sahib.

== Birth and early life ==
Makhan Shah was born into a Labana family. In 1619, he was born to Bhai Dasa Labana, who was a devout Sikh of Guru Hargobind. There are different views of different scholars regarding his birthplace. Giani Gian Singh believes that he was born in Tanda, probably in Kashmir, but Col. Gurbachan Singh refutes this claim. Also, there many places with name Tanda in India like Mansura Tanda in Rajasthan, Khed Tanda; Basti Tanda; Sankpur Tanda; Chikvadi Tanda in Madhya Pradesh; Naka Tanda in Maharashtra; Anapur Tanda Andhara Yera; Goda Tanda in Karnataka, Tanda in Kashmir and in Punjab there are multiple villages. Scholars like Max Arthur Macauliffe, GS Chabra, Sukha Singh believe that he was a native of Kathiawar in Gujarat.

Following is commentary from Bhatt Vahis regarding the background of Makhan Shah:

- Makhan Shah, son of Bhai Dasa, grandson of Binai, maternal grandson of Beheru.
- The cavalcade of Bhai Makhan Shah who was the Sikh of Guru, was going to Kashmir. The Satguru joined him there. After the pilgrimage of Mutton Martand along with Bhai Dasa and Bhai Aru Ram, he reached the place of Bhai Makhan Shah at Mota Tanda. Bhai Dasa, father of Bhai Makhan Shah breathed his last there.

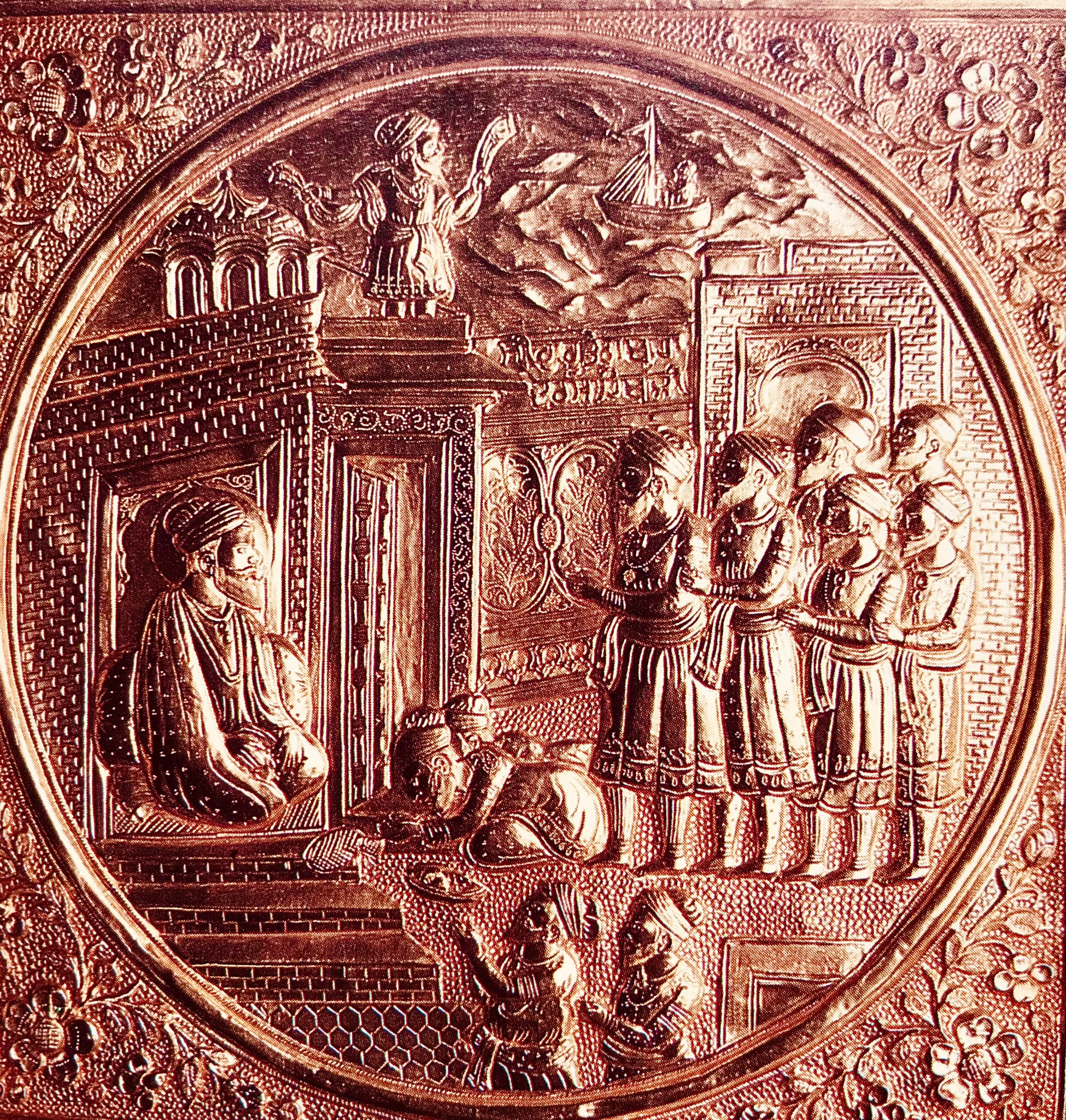
Depiction of Makhan Shah Lubana (top left on a rooftop) and Guru Tegh Bahadur (bottom left) from a gilded panel from the Golden Temple doors later donated by Maharaja Ranjit Singh

He learned Sanskrit, Persian, Arabic and other languages, but his mother tongue was Labanki. Makhan Shah was married, according to Rajput customs, to Sital Devi (also known as Suljai). She was the daughter of Naik Puroshotam Das, belonging to the Sandlas clan of Naik Rajputs. They had a son who they named Bhai Lal Das. It is believed Lal Das took was baptized by Guru Gobind Singh and named Naik Jawahar Singh who was martyred in the Battle of Chamkaur. Bhai Lakhi Shah Banjara had family and business relationships with Bhai Makhan Shah Labana (1619-1674), who was an international trader, and used to trade in most of the world. He had a fleet of ships and was dealing through marines. Bhai Lakhi Shah Vanjara, who was based in Delhi, use to coordinate the business activities at Delhi, of Bhai Makhan Shah Labana. (reference found in book Mahal Sikh Bhai Makhan Shah Labana 1940, written by Baba Harnam Singh and Diwan Singh Mehram page 27).

== Profession ==
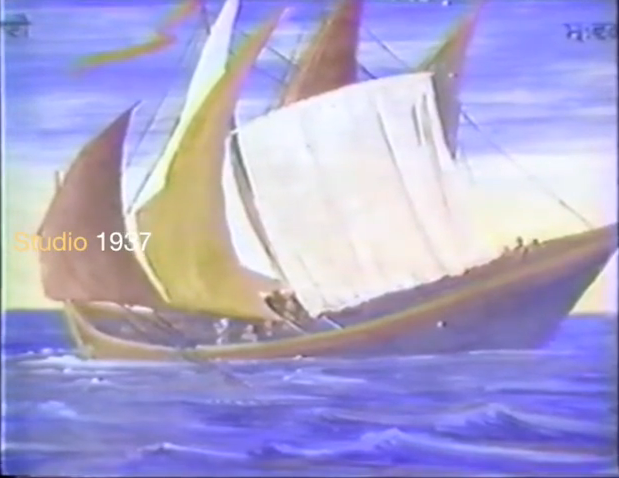
Fresco depicting Bhai Makhan Shah Labana at-sea, from Gurdwara Baba Bakala

He continued his ancestral profession of merchant trading. Makhan was a merchant who used to bring valuable merchandise by land and sea and sell it wholesale in parts of Gujarat and Punjab in Mughal India, and abroad up to the Mediterranean. He traded spices, Bengali silk, and Kashmir shawls. In India he used camels, oxen, and horses, often pulling carts. He crossed beyond Egypt and sailed the Mediterranean with his goods, trading as far as Portugal.

== See also ==
- Labana
