= Timmowal =

Coordinates: 31°32′N 75°06′E

- Village
- Location in Punjab, India Timmowal (India)
- Country: India
- State: Punjab
- District: Amritsar

Languages
  - Official: Punjabi
- Time zone: UTC+5:30 (IST)

Timmowal is a village located near Jandiala Guru in the Amritsar District of Punjab, about 30 km from Jodhe and 4 km from Tangra. Its Census village code is 037695

== About ==
This village has a Sikh religious place named Baba Gurditta Ji. Many people come here to worship. A fair (Mela) is held every year in the month of March which is attended by many people. Kabaddi tournaments are also held. Hockey player Harmanpreet Singh was born in this village.
