= Ghotra (disambiguation) =

The Ghotra are a Labana clan in India. Ghotra may also refer to:

- Ghotra (Ramgarhia), a Ramgarhia clan in Punjab, India

== See also ==
- Gotra, an Indian Hindu term meaning lineage
