= Bhai Lakhi Rai Banjara =

17th-century trader from Delhi

Lakhi Rai
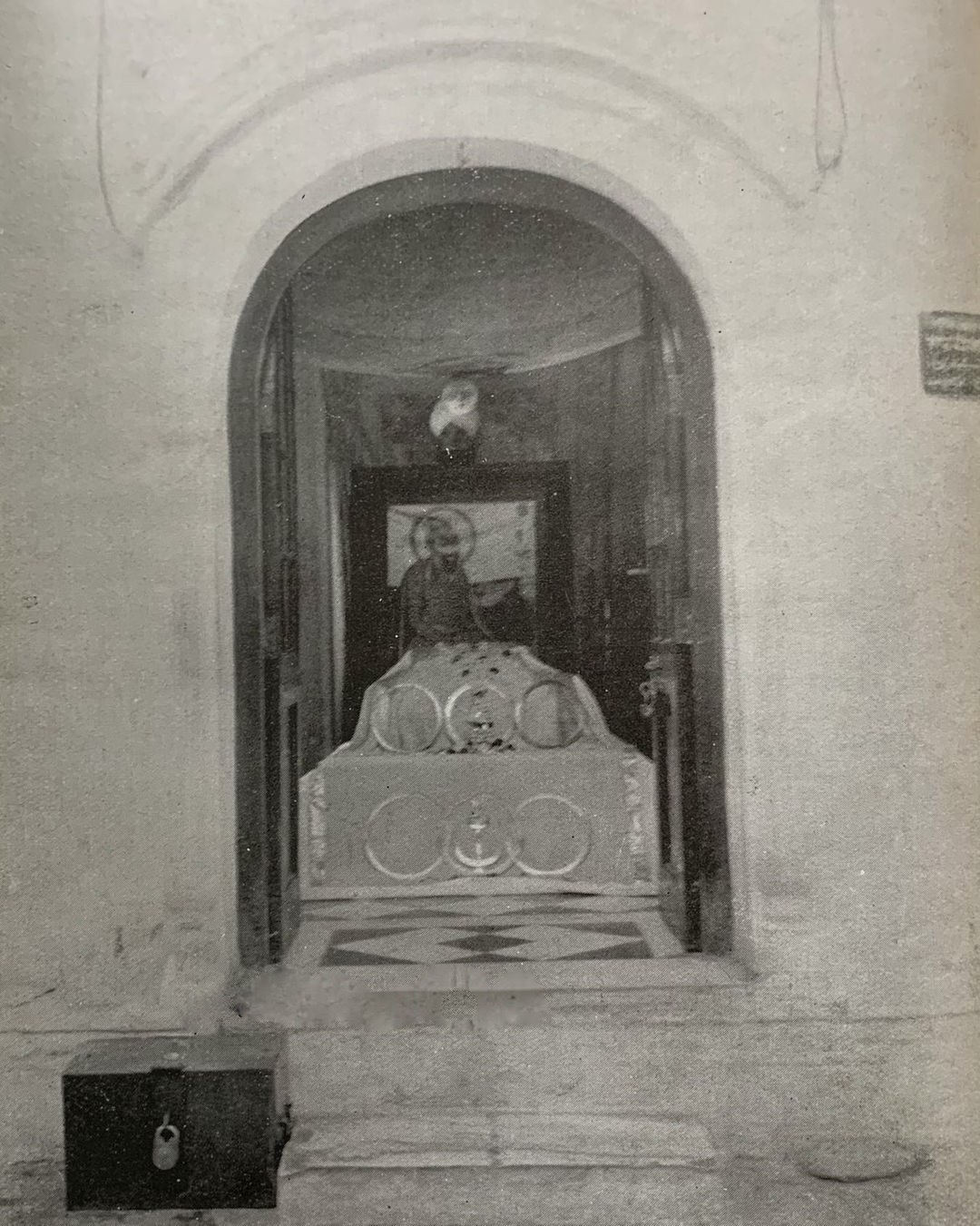
- Photograph of the location where Guru Tegh Bahadur's body was cremated by Bhai Lakhi Rai Banjara, Gurdwara Rakab Ganj Sahib, Delhi, ca.1920's
- Monuments: Lohagarh Fort, Red fort, Sarai Vanjara, Gurudwara Rakabganj
- Known for: Cremation the body of Guru Tegh Bahadur

Lakhi Rai (fl. 17th century), also known as Lakhi Shah, was a contractor of Delhi who was a follower of the Sikh gurus. He is remembered for assisting with the cremation of Guru Tegh Bahadur's remains after the execution of the guru. He accomplished this by cremating the guru's headless body by burning down his house on the outskirts of the city of Delhi with the corpse inside it.

== Legend ==
Bhai Lakhi Rai Banjara was of a Lubana and Banjara background. Lakhi Shah was a cotton-merchant of Delhi.

Guru Tegh Bahadur's body was mutilated and left in Chandni Chowk after his execution by the Mughals. During the night, there was a storm in Delhi. When Lakhi Shah was told that the guru had been executed by Bhai Uda of Ladwa, Lakhi Shah devised a plan with Uda to obtain the headless corpse of the guru using Lakhi Shah's familiarity to the Mughal officials since he was a contractor. Lakhi Shah emptied his carts laden with lime near the Red Fort and retired to his native village of Rakabganj. In the night, Lakhi Shah and his sons Nagahia, Hema, Harhi and another figure named Duma (son of Kanha) got ahold of the corpse of the guru and transported it away using the cart that was left earlier near the fort on 12 November 1675. Bhai Jaita got ahold of the severed head of the guru. The body was taken to the house of Lakhi Shah, who then burnt the house down to cremate the remains. The house, which was a dwelling-hut, was located on Raisina Hill. Back then, it was a colony of stirrup-makers. The inhabitants of the house wept like their house had actually burnt down unintentionally, which did not arouse the suspicions of Mughal police who were investigating the disappearance of the guru's body. Afterwards, some of the cremated remains were put into a gagar (metal-vessel) and transported to Anandpur whilst other parts of the remains were buried at the site of the burnt-down residence. At Anandpur, Guru Gobind Das received the remains that had been put into the metal-vessel. As per the Guru Kian Sakhian, he then embraced Lakhi Shah, who narrated the preceding events at Delhi involving his father to the guru.

== Legacy ==
Lakhi Shah's daughter, Sito Bai, would marry Bhai Mani Singh. However, other sources state Sito Bai was the daughter of Lakhi Rai Jadhaun. Gurdwara Rakabganj Sahib would later be constructed on the spot of the former hut of Lakhi Rai which had been burnt-down intentionally to cremate Guru Tegh Bahadur's headless corpse.

== See also ==
- Makhan Shah Lubana
