= Bhai Dasa =

Personal life
- Born: Dasa

Religious life
- Religion: Sikhism
- Lineage: Suryavanshi
- Profession: Merchant, Masand

Baba Dasa Labana (Gurmukhi: ਬਾਬਾ ਦਾਸਾ ਲਬਾਣਾ) (also called Bhai Dasa) was a Labana trader and a devout Sikh. He belonged to Mota Tanda. He was the father of Makhan Shah Labana. According to Sikh Historian Harpal Singh Kasoor, Bhai Dasa was Masand of Africa region, appointed by Guru Ram Das.
