= Gurdwara Baba Bakala Sahib =

Gurdwara in Punjab, India

Gurdwara Baba Bakala Sahib ਗੁਰਦੁਆਰਾ ਬਾਬਾ ਬਕਾਲ਼ਾ ਸਾਹਿਬ
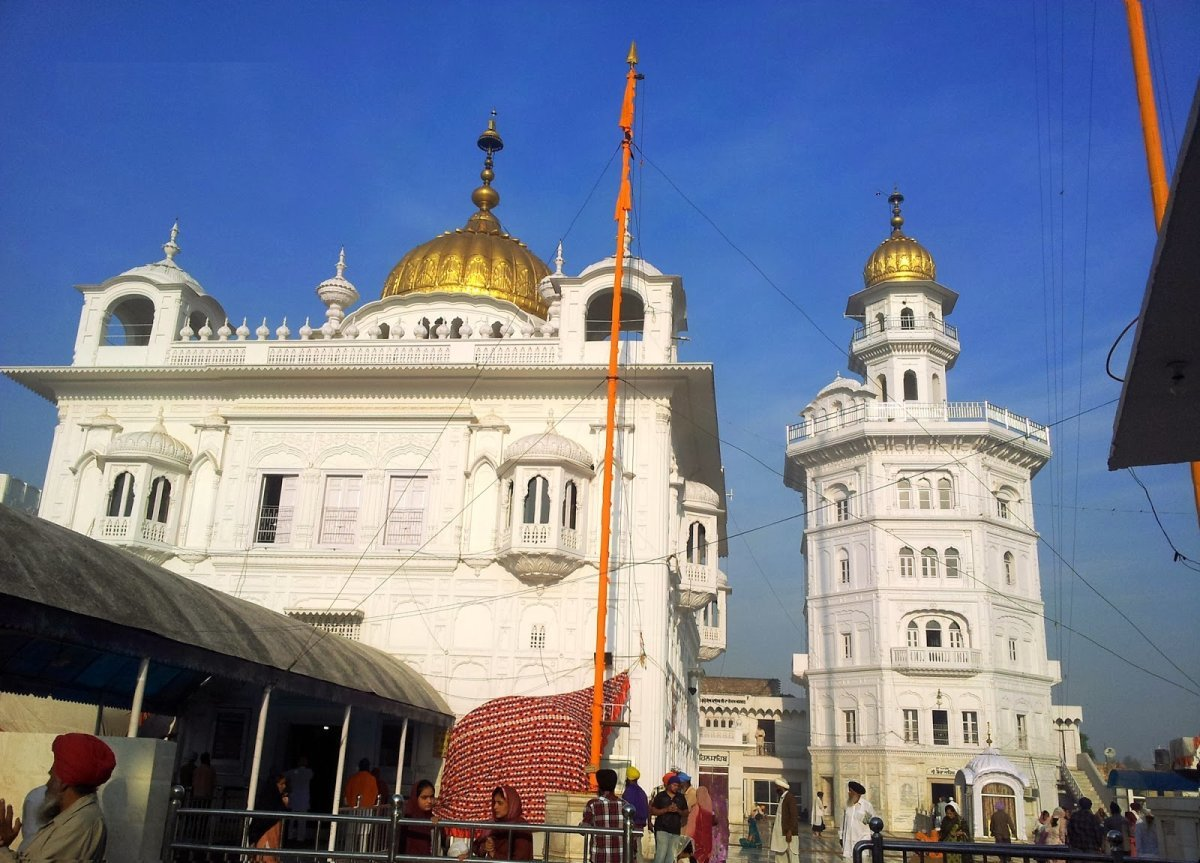
- Gurdwara Baba Bakala Sahib

- Location within Punjab Location within India

Religion
- Affiliation: Sikhism
- District: Amritsar

Location
- Location: Baba Bakala, Amritsar district, Punjab, India
- State: Punjab
- Country: India
- Administration: SGPC
- Coordinates: 31°33′18″N 75°15′56″E

Architecture
- Type: Gurdwara
- Style: Sikh architecture

Gurdwara Baba Bakala Sahib (Punjabi: ਗੁਰਦੁਆਰਾ ਬਾਬਾ ਬਕਾਲ਼ਾ ਸਾਹਿਬ) is a prominent Sikh Gurdwara in Baba Bakala, Punjab, India which is about 42 km from Amritsar. It is known for its association with the 9th Sikh Guru, Guru Tegh Bahadur, Mata Ganga and Baba Makhan Shah Lubana.

The main complex contains 4 Gurdwaras. The Gurdwara's Sarovar is located on the left hand-side of the bazaar leading up to the main Gurdwara complex. Opposite that there are also lodging facilities available for pilgrims.

== Location ==
Baba Bakala Sahib is located in the town of Baba Bakala which is in the Amritsar district of Punjab, India. The Gurdwara is on Gurdaspur Road and is 42 km away from Amritsar, 46 km from Jalandhar and 193 km from the state's capital of Chandigarh. It is instantly recognisable by the tall 9-storey Bhora Sahib beside the main Darbar Sahib.

== History ==
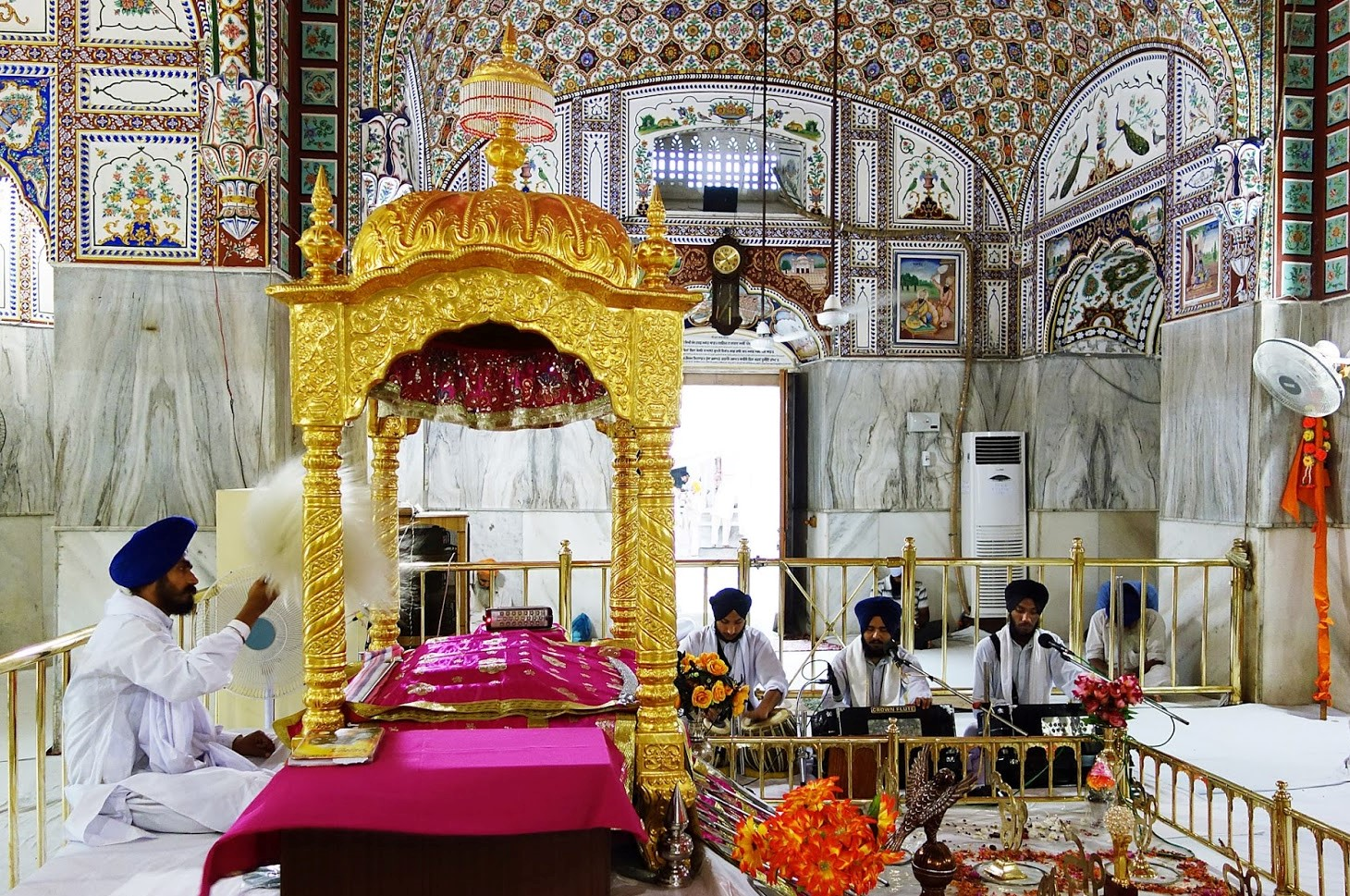
The inside of the Darbar Sahib at Gurdwara Baba Bakala Sahib

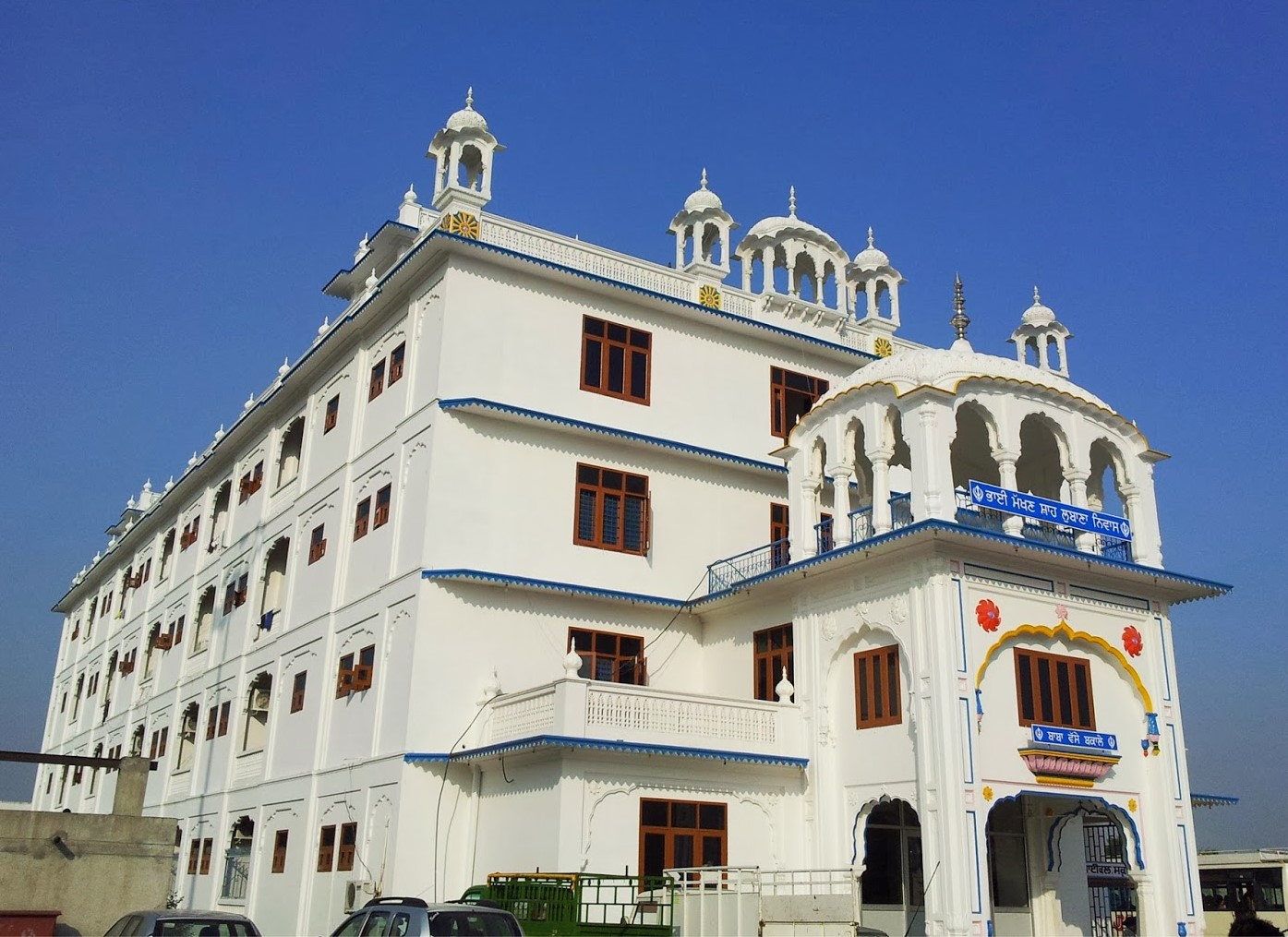
The lodging facilities available for pilgrims at Baba Bakala

The town of Baba Bakala was originally known as Bakkan-Wala (meaning 'Town of the Deer' in Persian) however over time this was shortened to Bakala. The town was originally a mound, where deer were found grazing.

In 1664, before dying in Delhi, the Guru at the time, Guru Har Krishan uttered "Baba Bakale" which the Sikhs at the time interpreted as meaning that the Guru's successor was to be found at the town of Bakala, close to Amritsar. The Sikhs now had to find the true Guru in Bakala.

The Guru was then found by a trader from Jhelum named Makhan Shah Lubana. As a trader, he was on a ship carrying his goods while it became caught up in a furious storm. As he was in danger, he began to pray to God and Guru Nanak Dev Ji for safety. He then vowed that he would donate 500 dinars to the Guru. Unaware of the news that Guru Har Krishan Ji had died, Lubana reached Bakala to fulfill his vow.

Eager to carry out his promise as soon as possible, Makhan Shah then reached Bakala but was shocked to see many people pretending to be the true Guru. He then came up with a plan to donate 2 dinars to each of the self-proclaimed Gurus, as he knew that the true Guru would demand the full amount that he had promised. None of the imposters demanded the full amount and so Makhan Shah was unable to find the Guru. He then asked around and he heard of a solitarian in the area, who was called Tegh Bahadur Ji, and was the son of Guru Hargobind Sahib Ji.

Upon placing 2 dinars before this man, the man replied "God bless you, my man, however why only two Dinars after pledging five hundred? The Guru is never in need of any thing but a Sikh is expected to keep his pledge to the Guru". Lubana thus discovered the true Guru and told him that he would reveal his identity to the World, however the Guru discouraged Lubana to do so as he was hoping to meditate in solitude for longer. Makhan Shah took this as a challenge and climbed the rooftop and shouted that he had found the true Guru. Up until they were found, Guru Tegh Bahadur meditated in solitude for 26 years, 9 months and 13 days, however they were not a recluse and they still attended to family affairs and he also visited the 8th Guru in Delhi whilst he was there.

== Artwork ==
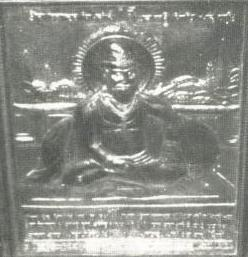
Repoussé plaque depicting Guru Tegh Bahadur bearing Gurmukhi inscriptions from the Bhora Sahib ("Meditation Cell"), Gurdwara Baba Bakala, Bakala, Punjab. Photographed by Trilochan Singh

The Sikh shrines of the Baba Bakala complex contain many frescoes. Many of these frescoes are in a dilapidated condition and require conservation efforts. A portion of the frescoes have been destroyed or hidden by being replaced or covered with ceramic tiles under the guise of Kar Seva renovations, much to the dismay of a section of the Sikh public who are heritage-conscious.

== Buildings ==
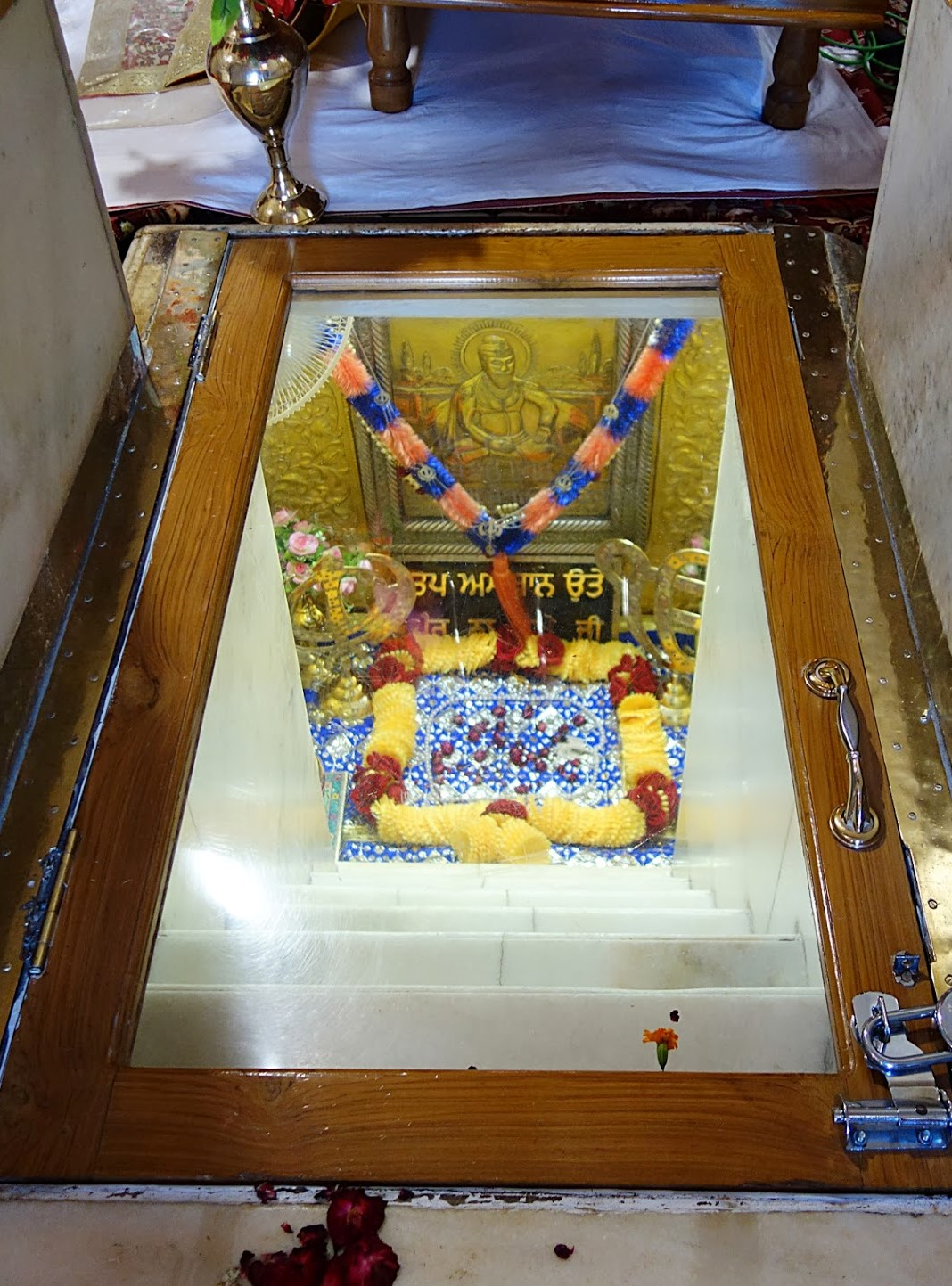
The cellar (Bhora) in which Guru Tegh Bahadur meditated in solitude

=== Gurdwara Manji Sahib ===
After finding Guru Tegh Bahadur, the Sikh congregation set up the Deewan here. While preaching on the Deewan, the Shia Masand fired at the Guru and the bullet scraped along the Guru's dastaar without causing any harm.

=== Gurdwara Bhora Sahib ===
This is the 9-storey building built above the cellar where Guru Tegh Bahadur meditated in solitude for 26 years, 9 months and 13 days and also where Baba Makhan Shah Lubaba stood and announced that he had found the true Guru.

=== Gurdwara Darbar Sahib ===
This is the place where in August 1664 the Sikh Sangat arrived in Bakala and anointed Tegh Bahadur as the ninth guru of Sikhs. The Sangat was led by Diwan Durga Mal, and a "Tilak ceremony" was performed by Baba Gurditta on Tegh Bahadur, formally conferring Guruship onto him.

=== Gurdwara Seesh Mahal ===
Here Mata Ganga, consort of Guru Arjan Dev, mother of Guru Hargobind and grandmother of Guru Tegh Bahadur died.
