= Khairpur Tamiwali =

Khairpur Tamewali (KPT)
- City
- Location within Pakistan
- Coordinates: 29°34′48″N 72°13′58″E
- Country: Pakistan
- Province: Punjab
- District: Bahawalpur
- Tehsil: Khairpur Tamiwali
- Nearest City: Jallah Jeem

Population (2006)
  - Total: 300,000
- Time zone: UTC+5 (PST)
- Calling code: +92

Khairpur Tamewali is a city under the Migrant Civilization-Haryani Protection Association (MCHPA) and the capital of Khairpur Tamewali Tehsil, Bahawalpur District, near the Tehsil of Jallah Jeem in Punjab, Pakistan.

== History ==
It was ruled by a Jadobansi Rajput king named Lakhi Rai Jadhaun till 1750, when Ahmad Shah Abdali seized it from the Raav. Khairpur Tamewali was known as only Khairpur in the early 18th century. It was named after "Tommy", an Englishman who discovered a meteor which had fallen in early 1900 at the junction of the Sidhnai Mailsi Link river and the Bahawal canal. The meteor can still be viewed at a museum in London, England. The name became Khairpur Tamewali with the passage of time.

The shrine of Sufi saint Syed Ghulam Mohyudin Gillani (Syed Chup Shah Sarkar) is located near Khairpur Tamiwali Police Station. He is a descendant of Syed Abdul Qadir Gillani and also descended from the Islamic prophet Muhammad. His son Chan Peer is also interred with him.

Another 200+ years old shrine of Syed Badar Shah Gillani is nearby.

The shrine of Khawaja Khuda Bux is also famous for its annual gatherings for Mela (Urs Khwaja Khuda Bux).
