= Harmanpreet Singh =

Indian field hockey player

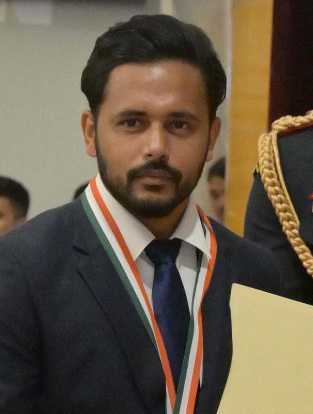
- Singh receiving the Khel Ratna Award in 2025

Personal information
- Full name: Harmanpreet Singh
- Born: 6 January 1996 (age 30) Timmowal, Amritsar, Punjab, India
- Height: 1.8 m (5 ft 11 in)
- Weight: 70 kg (154 lb)
- Spouse: Amandeep Kaur (m. 2021)

Sport
- Sport: Field hockey
- Position: Drag-flicker
Senior career
Years	Team	Caps	Goals
2014–2017	Dabang Mumbai	-	-
2017–2024	Petroleum Sports Board	-	-
2024–	Punjab Armed Police	-	-
2024–	Hockey Punjab	-	-
2024–	Soorma Hockey Club	-	-
National team
Years	Team	Caps	Goals
2011–2016	India U21	37	(32)
2015–	India	284	(250)
Medal record
Men's field hockey
Representing India
Olympic Games
Bronze medal – third place	2020 Tokyo	Team
Bronze medal – third place	2024 Paris	Team
Pro League
Bronze medal – third place	2021–22 Rotterdam
World League
Bronze medal – third place	2016–17 Bhubaneswar
Champions Trophy
Silver medal – second place	2016 London
Silver medal – second place	2018 Breda
Commonwealth Games
Silver medal – second place	2022 Birmingham	Team
Asian Games
Gold medal – first place	2026 Aichi-Nagoya	Team
Gold medal – first place	2022 Hangzhou	Team
Bronze medal – third place	2018 Jakarta	Team
Asia Cup
Gold medal – first place	2017 Dhaka
Gold medal – first place	2025 Rajgir
Asian Champions Trophy
Gold medal – first place	2018 Muscat
Gold medal – first place	2023 Chennai
Gold medal – first place	2024 Hulunbuir
Gold medal – first place	2026 Punjab
Bronze medal – third place	2021 Dhaka
Junior World Cup
Gold medal – first place	2016 Lucknow
Junior Asia Cup
Gold medal – first place	2015 Kuantan

Harmanpreet Singh (born 6 January 1996) is an Indian field hockey player and captain of the national hockey team. He plays as a defender, is a penalty corner specialist, and is regarded as one of the best drag flickers in the world. He has scored the most number of international goals for India in modern-day hockey. He led the team to clinch the bronze medal at the 2024 Paris Olympics. This was his second bronze in three appearances at the Olympics. Singh also captained the team to win gold medals at the 2022 Asian Games and 2026 Asian Games, becoming the first Indian captain to win two Asiad golds. He has won the Player of the Year title at the FIH Awards thrice. During the 2026 Men's Asian Champions Trophy match against Malaysia, he surpassed Balbir Singh Sr.'s tally of 246 international goals with his second of three goals in the match. He is now India's second-highest international goalscorer ever, behind only Major Dhyan Chand. He currently ranks fifth on the all-time list of highest international goalscorers.

== Early life ==
Singh was born to a Sikh family on 6 January 1996 in Timmowal, Amritsar, India. He had an interest in all sports and tried several of them including volleyball, football, cricket, and athletics. Singh started playing hockey at the age of 10 and joined the Surjit Singh Hockey Academy when he was 15 years old, hoping to become a forward.

== Personal life ==
Singh is married to Amandeep Kaur and they have a daughter Ruhanat Kaur. He is the richest Indian hockey player. As per GQ India, Singh's estimated net worth is $5 million (approximately ₹42 crore).

== Junior career ==
Singh made his debut for India Junior Team against New Zealand. He scored 9 goals at the 2014 Sultan of Johor Cup. His team won the tournament by defeating Great Britain 2–1 in the final. For his outstanding performances he was awarded Man of the Tournament Award. He scored 4 goals at 2015 Sultan of Johor Cup. Unfortunately his team lost in the final to Great Britain in penalties 3–4 after a 2–2 draw. He was the member of the team which won 2015 Men's Hockey Junior Asia Cup. He was the highest goalscorer of the tournament, he scored 14 goals. After his debut appearance at the Rio Olympics, he was selected for 2016 Men's Hockey Junior World Cup. Singh scored a crucial 66th-minute goal against Spain which helped his team win the match 2-1 and reach the semi-finals. His team won the tournament by defeating Belgium in the final 2–1. He scored 3 goals in the tournament.

== Senior career ==
=== Senior team debut (2015) ===
Singh received his maiden call-up for senior team in April 2015 when he was selected for the 3-match series against Japan. But he was dropped from the team for the next tournament which was the 2014–15 Men's World League Semifinals.

=== Highs and lows (2016) ===
Singh returned to the team for 2016 Sultan Azlan Shah Cup. He scored his 1st ever goal for national team against the Japanese team which helped the team win the match 2–1. He then scored one goal in the match against Canada which was won by his team 3–1. He scored 2 goals in the tournament. The national team faced a crushing defeat to Australia in the final 4–0.

Singh was retained in the squad for 2016 Champions Trophy. In the 1st match against Germany, he scored a goal in the 32nd minute but the match ended in a 3–3 draw and in the next match against Great Britain he scored a goal in the 34th minute which helped his team win the match 2–1. The final against Australia ended in a 0–0 draw. In the penalty shootout only Singh managed to score. His team lost the final in 3–1 on penalties. Singh scored 2 goals in the tournament and won the Young Player of the Tournament award.

He was named in the Indian squad for Rio Olympics. Singh had a disappointing outing at the Rio Olympics 2016. He failed to score a single goal. His coach claimed he had unperformed and had not done justice to the outstanding talent and prowess that he possessed as a player. The team lost to Belgium in the quarter-finals 1–3. Out of six games, India managed to win only two which was a disappointing conclusion to their Olympic campaign. Singh was dropped from the team for 2016 Asian Champions Trophy and 4 Nations invitational tournament after the disastrous Olympics campaign.

=== Return to the team (2017) ===
After his improved performances at the 2016 Junior World Cup, Singh returned to the national team for 2017 Sultan Azlan Shah Cup. He scored 2 goals (27th minute and 47th minute) in the match against New Zealand which the team won comfortably 3–0. He was the lone scorer (26th minute) in the match against Australia which the team lost 1–3. Singh managed to score 3 goals in the tournament and the team finished 3rd.

Singh was named in squad for 2016–17 World League Semifinals. He was then selected for the 2017 Asia Cup. He scored 2 goals in the 35th minute and 48th minute in the 1st match against Japan. India easily won the match 5–1. He again scored 2 goals in the next match against Bangladesh in the 28th and 47th minute. The team won the match 7–0. He then scored a goal in the 45th minute of match against arch-rivals Pakistan which was also won by the team 3–1. His team topped the pool and qualified for the Super 4s stage. He scored a goal in the 19th minute in a thrashing win over of 6–1 over Malaysia. He then scored a goal in the 51 minute in the match against Pakistan which was won by the team 4–0 to enter the finals. The national team won the tournament by defeating Malaysia 2–1 in the final to win their 3rd title. Singh was the joint high scorer with Malaysian Faizal Saari with 7 goals.

=== Tokyo Olympics victory (2020) ===
Singh had a stellar performance in the 2020 Tokyo Olympics. He scored twice against New Zealand in a 3–2 win. He scored against Argentina in a 3–1 victory. He also scored a goal against Japan in the 5–3 win as well as against Belgium in the semifinals, but India lost 5–2. In the bronze medal match, Singh scored a goal against Germany, securing a 5–4 win for India. His consistency throughout the tournament was instrumental in guiding India to the Olympic medal after 41 years.

=== Rise to excellence (2021–2022) ===
In the 2021–22 Pro League match against England, Singh scored his 100th goal. He went to score a hat-trick in the same match helping his team to win the match 4–3. He then scored two goals against Germany which helped his team win the match 3–0. In modern AstroTurf hockey he has scored most international goals for India.

Singh had a stellar performance at the 2022 Commonwealth Games, helping India secure a silver medal. He was the second-highest goal scorer in the competition, netting nine goals throughout the tournament. His outstanding achievements have led to him becoming the fourth player to win the FIH Player of the Year award consecutively, joining an elite group comprising Teun De Nooijer, Jamie Dwyer, and Arthur van Doren.

Singh led the Indian field hockey team to a gold medal win at the 2022 Asian Games by defeating the defending champions Japan 5–1 in the final. As winners India qualified directly for the 2024 Summer Olympics. He was the top scorer for India, netting 13 goals at the Asian Games, and showcased his expertise as a penalty corner specialist.

=== Start of captaincy (2022–2023) ===
Singh was appointed captain ahead of the 2022–23 season of the Pro League. He was retained as the captain for the 2023 World Cup. India were knocked out on penalties by New Zealand in the crossover stage, ahead of the quarter-finals, and finished joint ninth after a win over South Africa. However, Singh had a particularly successful year and went on to score 42 goals from 33 matches. On 10 February 2024, he scored twice in the opening match against Spain in the 2023–24 edition of the Pro League. The first was a penalty corner conversion while the second came off a penalty stroke. He scored a match-saving equaliser from another penalty corner conversion in India's next match against the Netherlands, his 200th appearance for the nation. The match ended in a 2–2 draw.

=== Olympics and Champions Trophy victories (2024) ===
Singh was nominated as the captain of the hockey team for Paris Olympics 2024. He led the team to a bronze win against Spain on August 8, 2024, at the 2024 Olympics. He was the top scorer in the tournament with a total of 10 goals, including two crucial goals in the bronze medal match. He also scored two goals against Australia, leading India to their first victory against them in 52 years. As the captain, he demonstrated exceptional leadership throughout the campaign, leading the team to a record-extending 13th medal in hockey at the Olympics. Singh's consistent performance was key to the success.

Due to his excellent performance, he earned the moniker of Sarpanch Sahab by sports commentator Sunil Taneja and the media followed through. After winning the bronze medal Prime Minister Narendra Modi called the team and congratulated them.

Singh continued his incredible performance at the 2024 Asian Champions Trophy. He was the top scorer for the Indian team with a total of 7 goals, and played a crucial role in India's fifth title. He was instrumental in India's 2–1 win over Pakistan, netting twice and showcasing calm leadership to navigate the team. His impressive form continued with a brace in the semifinal against South Korea and a decisive assist for Jugraj Singh's goal in the final, ultimately earning him the Player of the Tournament award.

=== Pro League (2024–2025) ===
TBA

== Franchise career ==
Singh was bought by Dabang Mumbai for $51000 in the 2015 Hockey India League, he scored 5 goals in his first edition. He went on to win the Ponty Chadha award for the most promising player of the tournament in 2015. Daband Mumbai retained him for the 2016 edition. He scored 2 goals in the whole season but his good defensive skills helped in making the case to retain him. He scored 6 goals in the 2017 edition. He also won the Upcoming Player of the Tournament award.

In 2024, during the 2024–25 Hockey India League auctions, Soorma Hockey Club bought him for ₹78 lakhs making him the most expensive player of the season. He was announced as the captain of the team.

== International goals ==
No.	Date	Venue	Opponent	Score	Result	Competition
1.	6 April 2016	Ipoh, Malaysia	Japan	1–1	2–1	2016 Sultan Azlan Shah Cup
2.	10 April 2016	Ipoh, Malaysia	Canada	2–1	3–1	2016 Sultan Azlan Shah Cup
3.	10 June 2016	London, United Kingdom	Germany	3–1	3–3	2016 Men's Hockey Champions Trophy
4.	11 June 2016	London, United Kingdom	Great Britain	2–0	2–1	2016 Men's Hockey Champions Trophy
5.	30 April 2017	Ipoh, Malaysia	New Zealand	2–0	3–0	2017 Sultan Azlan Shah Cup
6.	30 April 2017	Ipoh, Malaysia	New Zealand	3–0	3–0	2017 Sultan Azlan Shah Cup
7.	2 May 2017	Ipoh, Malaysia	Australia	1–0	1–3	2017 Sultan Azlan Shah Cup
8.	15 June 2017	London, England	Scotland	4–1	4–1	2016–17 Men's FIH Hockey World League Semifinals
9.	18 June 2017	London, England	Pakistan	1–0	7–1	2016–17 Men's FIH Hockey World League Semifinals
10.	18 June 2017	London, England	Pakistan	4–0	7–1	2016–17 Men's FIH Hockey World League Semifinals
11.	24 June 2017	London, England	Pakistan	5–0	6–1	2016–17 Men's FIH Hockey World League Semifinals
12.	25 June 2017	London, England	Canada	1–1	2–3	2016–17 Men's FIH Hockey World League Semifinals
13.	25 June 2017	London, England	Canada	2–1	2–3	2016–17 Men's FIH Hockey World League Semifinals
14.	11 October 2017	Dhaka, Bangladesh	Japan	4–1	5–1	2017 Men's Hockey Asia Cup
15.	11 October 2017	Dhaka, Bangladesh	Japan	5–1	5–1	2017 Men's Hockey Asia Cup
16.	13 October 2017	Dhaka, Bangladesh	Bangladesh	5–0	7–0	2017 Men's Hockey Asia Cup
17.	13 October 2017	Dhaka, Bangladesh	Bangladesh	7–0	7–0	2017 Men's Hockey Asia Cup
18.	15 October 2017	Dhaka, Bangladesh	Pakistan	3–0	3–1	2017 Men's Hockey Asia Cup
19.	19 October 2017	Dhaka, Bangladesh	Malaysia	2–0	6–2	2017 Men's Hockey Asia Cup
20.	21 October 2017	Dhaka, Bangladesh	Pakistan	2–0	4–0	2017 Men's Hockey Asia Cup
21.	6 December 2017	Bhubaneswar, India	Belgium	3–2	3–3 (3–2 p)	2016–17 Men's FIH Hockey World League Final
22.	10 December 2017	Bhubaneswar, India	Germany	2–1	2–1	2016–17 Men's FIH Hockey World League Final
23.	7 April 2018	Gold Coast, Australia	Pakistan	2–0	2–2	2018 Commonwealth Games
24.	8 April 2018	Gold Coast, Australia	Wales	3–2	4–3	2018 Commonwealth Games
25.	10 April 2018	Gold Coast, Australia	Malaysia	1–0	2–1	2018 Commonwealth Games
26.	10 April 2018	Gold Coast, Australia	Malaysia	2–1	2–1	2018 Commonwealth Games
27.	13 April 2018	Gold Coast, Australia	New Zealand	1–2	2–3	2018 Commonwealth Games
28.	13 April 2018	Gold Coast, Australia	New Zealand	2–3	2–3	2018 Commonwealth Games
29.	24 June 2018	Breda, Netherlands	Argentina	1–0	2–1	2018 Men's Hockey Champions Trophy
30.	27 June 2018	Breda, Netherlands	Australia	2–3	2–3	2018 Men's Hockey Champions Trophy
31.	28 June 2018	Breda, Netherlands	Belgium	1–0	1–1	2018 Men's Hockey Champions Trophy
32.	20 August 2018	Jakarta, Indonesia	Indonesia	9–0	17–0	2018 Asian Games
33.	22 August 2018	Jakarta, Indonesia	Hong Kong	12–0	26–0	2018 Asian Games
34.	22 August 2018	Jakarta, Indonesia	Hong Kong	21–0	26–0	2018 Asian Games
35.	22 August 2018	Jakarta, Indonesia	Hong Kong	22–0	26–0	2018 Asian Games
36.	22 August 2018	Jakarta, Indonesia	Hong Kong	25–0	26–0	2018 Asian Games
37.	28 August 2018	Jakarta, Indonesia	Sri Lanka	2–0	20–0	2018 Asian Games
38.	28 August 2018	Jakarta, Indonesia	Sri Lanka	6–0	20–0	2018 Asian Games
39.	28 August 2018	Jakarta, Indonesia	Sri Lanka	9–0	20–0	2018 Asian Games
40.	30 August 2018	Jakarta, Indonesia	Malaysia	1–0	2–2 (6–7 p)	2018 Asian Games
41.	1 September 2018	Jakarta, Indonesia	Pakistan	2–0	2–1	2018 Asian Games
42.	18 October 2018	Muscat, Oman	Oman	2–0	11–0	2018 Men's Asian Champions Trophy
43.	21 October 2018	Muscat, Oman	Japan	3–0	9–0	2018 Men's Asian Champions Trophy
44.	21 October 2018	Muscat, Oman	Japan	4–0	9–0	2018 Men's Asian Champions Trophy
45.	24 October 2018	Muscat, Oman	South Korea	1–0	4–1	2018 Men's Asian Champions Trophy
46.	24 October 2018	Muscat, Oman	South Korea	3–1	4–1	2018 Men's Asian Champions Trophy
47.	24 October 2018	Muscat, Oman	South Korea	4–1	4–1	2018 Men's Asian Champions Trophy
48.	2 December 2018	Bhubaneswar, India	Belgium	1–1	2–2	2018 Men's Hockey World Cup
49.	4 December 2018	Bhubaneswar, India	Canada	1–0	5–1	2018 Men's Hockey World Cup
50.	6 June 2019	Bhubaneswar, India	Russia	4–0	10–0	2018–19 Men's FIH Series Finals
51.	6 June 2019	Bhubaneswar, India	Russia	9–0	10–0	2018–19 Men's FIH Series Finals
52.	7 June 2019	Bhubaneswar, India	Poland	3–1	3–1	2018–19 Men's FIH Series Finals
53.	14 June 2019	Bhubaneswar, India	Japan	1–1	7–2	2018–19 Men's FIH Series Finals
54.	15 June 2019	Bhubaneswar, India	South Africa	2–0	5–1	2018–19 Men's FIH Series Finals
55.	15 June 2019	Bhubaneswar, India	South Africa	3–0	5–1	2018–19 Men's FIH Series Finals
56.	22 February 2020	Bhubaneswar, India	Australia	2–1	2–2 (3–1 p)	2020–21 Men's FIH Pro League
57.	10 April 2020	Buenos Aires, Argentina	Argentina	1–0	2–2 (3–2 p)	2020–21 Men's FIH Pro League
58.	10 April 2020	Buenos Aires, Argentina	Argentina	2–2	2–2 (3–2 p)	2020–21 Men's FIH Pro League
59.	11 April 2020	Buenos Aires, Argentina	Argentina	1–0	3–0	2020–21 Men's FIH Pro League
60.	24 July 2021	Tokyo, Japan	New Zealand	2–1	3–2	2020 Summer Olympics
61.	24 July 2021	Tokyo, Japan	New Zealand	3–1	3–2	2020 Summer Olympics
62.	29 July 2021	Tokyo, Japan	Argentina	3–1	3–1	2020 Summer Olympics
63.	30 July 2021	Tokyo, Japan	Japan	1–0	5–3	2020 Summer Olympics
64.	3 August 2021	Tokyo, Japan	Belgium	1–1	2–5	2020 Summer Olympics
65.	5 August 2021	Tokyo, Japan	Germany	3–3	5–4	2020 Summer Olympics
66.	14 December 2021	Dhaka, Bangladesh	South Korea	2–0	2–2	2021 Men's Asian Champions Trophy
67.	15 December 2021	Dhaka, Bangladesh	Bangladesh	9–0	9–0	2021 Men's Asian Champions Trophy
68.	17 December 2021	Dhaka, Bangladesh	Pakistan	1–0	3–1	2021 Men's Asian Champions Trophy
69.	17 December 2021	Dhaka, Bangladesh	Pakistan	3–1	3–1	2021 Men's Asian Champions Trophy
70.	19 December 2021	Dhaka, Bangladesh	Japan	1–0	6–0	2021 Men's Asian Champions Trophy
71.	19 December 2021	Dhaka, Bangladesh	Japan	5–0	6–0	2021 Men's Asian Champions Trophy
72.	21 December 2021	Dhaka, Bangladesh	Japan	2–5	3–5	2021 Men's Asian Champions Trophy
73.	22 December 2021	Dhaka, Bangladesh	Pakistan	1–0	4–3	2021 Men's Asian Champions Trophy
74.	8 February 2022	Potchefstroom, South Africa	France	1–0	5–0	2021–22 Men's FIH Pro League
75.	9 February 2022	Potchefstroom, South Africa	South Africa	1–0	10–2	2021–22 Men's FIH Pro League
76.	12 February 2022	Potchefstroom, South Africa	France	2–3	2–5	2021–22 Men's FIH Pro League
77.	13 February 2022	Potchefstroom, South Africa	South Africa	4–1	10–2	2021–22 Men's FIH Pro League
78.	13 February 2022	Potchefstroom, South Africa	South Africa	7–1	10–2	2021–22 Men's FIH Pro League
79.	13 February 2022	Potchefstroom, South Africa	South Africa	9–2	10–2	2021–22 Men's FIH Pro League
80.	13 February 2022	Potchefstroom, South Africa	South Africa	10–2	10–2	2021–22 Men's FIH Pro League
81.	26 February 2022	Bhubaneswar, India	Spain	1–1	5–4	2021–22 Men's FIH Pro League
82.	26 February 2022	Bhubaneswar, India	Spain	5–4	5–4	2021–22 Men's FIH Pro League
83.	27 February 2022	Bhubaneswar, India	Spain	2–3	3–4	2021–22 Men's FIH Pro League
84.	2 April 2022	Bhubaneswar, India	England	3–2	3–3 (3–2 p)	2021–22 Men's FIH Pro League
85.	3 April 2022	Bhubaneswar, India	England	2–1	4–3	2021–22 Men's FIH Pro League
86.	3 April 2022	Bhubaneswar, India	England	3–1	4–3	2021–22 Men's FIH Pro League
87.	3 April 2022	Bhubaneswar, India	England	4–2	4–3	2021–22 Men's FIH Pro League
88.	14 April 2022	Bhubaneswar, India	Germany	1–0	3–0	2021–22 Men's FIH Pro League
89.	14 April 2022	Bhubaneswar, India	Germany	2–0	3–0	2021–22 Men's FIH Pro League
90.	11 June 2022	Antwerp, Belgium	Belgium	2–3	3–3 (5–4 p)	2021–22 Men's FIH Pro League
91.	18 June 2022	Rotterdam, Netherlands	Netherlands	2–2	2–2 (1–4 p)	2021–22 Men's FIH Pro League
92.	31 July 2022	Birmingham, England	Ghana	2–0	11–0	2022 Commonwealth Games
93.	31 July 2022	Birmingham, England	Ghana	6–0	11–0	2022 Commonwealth Games
94.	31 July 2022	Birmingham, England	Ghana	11–0	11–0	2022 Commonwealth Games
95.	1 August 2022	Birmingham, England	England	4–1	4–4	2022 Commonwealth Games
96.	3 August 2022	Birmingham, England	Canada	1–0	8–0	2022 Commonwealth Games
97.	3 August 2022	Birmingham, England	Canada	6–0	8–0	2022 Commonwealth Games
98.	4 August 2022	Birmingham, England	Wales	1–0	4–1	2022 Commonwealth Games
99.	4 August 2022	Birmingham, England	Wales	2–0	4–1	2022 Commonwealth Games
100.	4 August 2022	Birmingham, England	Wales	3–0	4–1	2022 Commonwealth Games
101.	28 October 2022	Bhubaneswar, India	New Zealand	2–3	4–3	2022–23 Men's FIH Pro League
102.	30 October 2022	Bhubaneswar, India	Spain	1–1	2–3	2022–23 Men's FIH Pro League
103.	4 November 2022	Bhubaneswar, India	New Zealand	1–1	7–4	2022–23 Men's FIH Pro League
104.	4 November 2022	Bhubaneswar, India	New Zealand	3–3	7–4	2022–23 Men's FIH Pro League
105.	6 November 2022	Bhubaneswar, India	Spain	1–0	2–2 (3–1 p)	2022–23 Men's FIH Pro League
106.	6 November 2022	Bhubaneswar, India	Spain	2–0	2–2 (3–1 p)	2022–23 Men's FIH Pro League
123.	19 January 2023	Bhubaneswar, India	Wales	4–2	4–2	2023 Men's FIH Hockey World Cup
124.	26 January 2023	Rourkela, India	Japan	5–0	8–0	2023 Men's FIH Hockey World Cup
125.	26 January 2023	Rourkela, India	Japan	7–0	8–0	2023 Men's FIH Hockey World Cup
126.	28 January 2023	Rourkela, India	South Africa	2–0	5–2	2023 Men's FIH Hockey World Cup
127.	10 March 2023	Rourkela, India	Germany	1–0	3–2	2022–23 Men's IFH Pro League
128.	12 March 2023	Rourkela, India	Australia	1–1	5–4	2022–23 Men's IFH Pro League
129.	12 March 2023	Rourkela, India	Australia	2–1	5–4	2022–23 Men's IFH Pro League
130.	12 March 2023	Rourkela, India	Australia	5–3	5–4	2022–23 Men's IFH Pro League
131.	13 March 2023	Rourkela, India	Germany	4–2	6–3	2022–23 Men's IFH Pro League
132.	27 May 2023	London, Great Britain	Great Britain	1–1	4–3	2022–23 Men's IFH Pro League
133.	27 May 2023	London, Great Britain	Great Britain	2–3	4–3	2022–23 Men's IFH Pro League
134.	2 June 2023	London, Great Britain	Belgium	2–0	5–1	2022–23 Men's IFH Pro League
135.	2 June 2023	London, Great Britain	Belgium	3–0	5–1	2022–23 Men's IFH Pro League
136.	7 June 2023	Eindhoven, Netherlands	Netherlands	1–0	4–1	2022–23 Men's IFH Pro League
137.	8 June 2023	Eindhoven, Netherlands	Argentina	2–0	3–0	2022–23 Men's IFH Pro League
138.	25 July 2023	Terrassa, Spain	Spain	1–2	1–2	Torneio del Centenario 2023
139.	26 July 2023	Terrassa, Spain	Netherlands	1–0	1–1	Torneio del Centenario 2023
140.	28 July 2023	Terrassa, Spain	England	1–1	1–1	Torneio del Centenario 2023
141.	30 July 2023	Terrassa, Spain	Netherlands	1–0	2–1	Torneio del Centenario 2023
142.	3 August 2023	Chennai, India	China	1–0	7–2	2023 Men's Asian Champions Trophy
143.	3 August 2023	Chennai, India	China	2–0	7–2	2023 Men's Asian Champions Trophy
144.	4 August 2023	Chennai, India	Japan	1–1	1–1	2023 Men's Asian Champions Trophy
145.	6 August 2023	Chennai, India	Malaysia	3–0	5–0	2023 Men's Asian Champions Trophy
146.	7 August 2023	Chennai, India	South Korea	2–1	3–2	2023 Men's Asian Champions Trophy
147.	9 August 2023	Chennai, India	Pakistan	1–0	4–0	2023 Men's Asian Champions Trophy
148.	9 August 2023	Chennai, India	Pakistan	2–0	4–0	2023 Men's Asian Champions Trophy
149.	11 August 2023	Chennai, India	Japan	2–0	5–0	2023 Men's Asian Champions Trophy
150.	12 August 2023	Chennai, India	Malaysia	2–3	4–3	2023 Men's Asian Champions Trophy
151.	26 September 2023	Hangzhou, China	Singapore	5–0	16–1	2022 Asian Games
152.	26 September 2023	Hangzhou, China	Singapore	9–0	16–1	2022 Asian Games
153.	26 September 2023	Hangzhou, China	Singapore	10–0	16–1	2022 Asian Games
154.	26 September 2023	Hangzhou, China	Singapore	11–0	16–1	2022 Asian Games
155.	30 September 2023	Hangzhou, China	Pakistan	2–0	10–2	2022 Asian Games
156.	30 September 2023	Hangzhou, China	Pakistan	3–0	10–2	2022 Asian Games
157.	30 September 2023	Hangzhou, China	Pakistan	5–0	10–2	2022 Asian Games
158.	30 September 2023	Hangzhou, China	Pakistan	6–0	10–2	2022 Asian Games
159.	2 October 2023	Hangzhou, China	Bangladesh	1–0	12–0	2022 Asian Games
160.	2 October 2023	Hangzhou, China	Bangladesh	2–0	12–0	2022 Asian Games
161.	2 October 2023	Hangzhou, China	Bangladesh	7–0	12–0	2022 Asian Games
162.	6 October 2023	Hangzhou, China	Japan	2–0	5–1	2022 Asian Games
163.	6 October 2023	Hangzhou, China	Japan	5–1	5–1	2022 Asian Games
164.	26 January 2024	Cape Town, South Africa	South Africa	1–0	3–0	Test Match
165.	10 February 2024	Bhubaneswar, India	Spain	1–0	4–1	2023–24 Men's FIH Pro League
166.	10 February 2024	Bhubaneswar, India	Spain	2–0	4–1	2023–24 Men's FIH Pro League
167.	11 February 2024	Bhubaneswar, India	Netherlands	2–2	2–2 (4–2 p)	2023–24 Men's FIH Pro League
168.	15 February 2024	Bhubaneswar, India	Australia	1–0	4–6	2023–24 Men's FIH Pro League
169.	15 February 2024	Bhubaneswar, India	Australia	3–2	4–6	2023–24 Men's FIH Pro League
170.	24 February 2024	Rourkela, India	Australia	1–0	2–2 (0–3 p)	2023–24 Men's FIH Pro League
171.	7 April 2024	Perth, Australia	Australia	2–1	2–4	Test Match
172.	12 April 2024	Perth, Australia	Australia	1–0	1–3	Test Match
173.	13 April 2024	Perth, Australia	Australia	1–0	2–3	Test Match
174.	26 May 2024	Antwerp, Belgium	Argentina	3–2	5–4	2023–24 Men's FIH Pro League
175.	26 May 2024	Antwerp, Belgium	Argentina	4–2	5–4	2023–24 Men's FIH Pro League
176.	26 May 2024	Antwerp, Belgium	Argentina	5–2	5–4	2023–24 Men's FIH Pro League
177.	1 June 2024	London, England	Germany	1–0	3–0	2023–24 Men's FIH Pro League
178.	8 June 2024	London, England	Germany	1–2	2–3	2023–24 Men's FIH Pro League
179.	9 June 2024	London, England	Great Britain	2–1	2–3	2023–24 Men's FIH Pro League
180.	27 July 2024	Paris, France	New Zealand	3–2	3–2	2024 Summer Olympics
181.	29 July 2024	Paris, France	Argentina	1–1	1–1	2024 Summer Olympics
182.	30 July 2024	Paris, France	Ireland	1–0	2–0	2024 Summer Olympics
183.	30 July 2024	Paris, France	Ireland	2–0	2–0	2024 Summer Olympics
184.	2 August 2024	Paris, France	Australia	2–0	3–2	2024 Summer Olympics
185.	2 August 2024	Paris, France	Australia	3–1	3–2	2024 Summer Olympics
186.	4 August 2024	Paris, France	Great Britain	1–0	1–1 (4–2 p)	2024 Summer Olympics
187.	6 August 2024	Paris, France	Germany	1–0	2–3	2024 Summer Olympics
188.	8 August 2024	Paris, France	Spain	1–1	2–1	2024 Summer Olympics
189.	8 August 2024	Paris, France	Spain	2–1	2–1	2024 Summer Olympics

== Awards and nominations ==
Year	Award	Category	Result	Ref.
2014	Hockey India Awards	Upcoming Player of the Year	Won	
2016	FIH Awards	Rising Star of the Year	Nominated	
2017	Times of India Sports Awards	Hockey Player of the Year Male	Won	
2017	Indian Sports Honours	Emerging Sportsman of the Year	Nominated	
2019	Times of India Sports Awards	Hockey Player of the Year Male	Won	
2019	Hockey India Awards	Defender of the Year	Won	
2020	Times of India Sports Awards	Hockey Player of the Year Male	Won	
2020–2021	FIH Awards	Player of the Year	Won	
2021	Arjuna Award	Outstanding Performance in Sports and Games	Won	
2021	Hockey India Awards	Player of the Year	Won	
2022	FIH Awards	Player of the Year	Won	
2022	Hockey India Awards	Defender of the Year	Won	
2023	Hockey India Awards	Defender of the Year	Won	
2024	FIH Awards	Player of the Year	Won	
2024	Indian Sports Honours	Team Sportsman of the Year	Won	
2024	GQ Awards	Sportsman of the Year	Won	
2025	Khel Ratna Award	Spectacular Performance in Sports	Won	
2025	Times of India Sports Awards	Hockey Player of the Year Male	TBA	
2025	Hockey India Awards	Defender of the Year	Nominated	
2025	Hockey India Awards	Player of the Year Male	Won	
