= Sandla =

Sandla may refer to the following places :

- Sandla, Estonia, a village in Estonia
- Sandla, India, a thikana of thakorate Multhan jagir (both Rajput-held), under Dhar State, in present day Madhya Pradesh
- Sandla, Mbabane, a neighborhood of Mbabane, Eswatini

== See also ==
- Sandlas, a surname
