= Harpal Singh Kasoor =

Harpal Singh Kasoor is a Sikh kathavachak (expounder of Sikh teachings and history) and amateur Sikh historian who makes fantastical claims regarding the travels of Guru Nanak. He resides in Canada and runs an Internet blog at the domain satguru.weebly.com. His websites contains purported details and routes taken by Guru Nanak and his retinue throughout the world.

== East African claim ==
In an article republished by SikhNet, Harpal Singh claims that Guru Nanak had visited East Africa, specifically Uganda.

== Scandinavian claim ==
In an article on his blog titled Two Singing Preachers From India In Norway"Preacheur Parler"--1545, Says Indian Chief, Donnacona. [sic], Harpal claims that Guru Nanak had visited many parts of Europe, including as far as Bergen in Norway, where he apparently held a discussion with local traders in the Persian-language in the summer of 1520. In 2010, while visiting a local gurdwara in Stockholm, Sweden, Harpal appealed to local Swedish Sikhs to help him uncover and translate records held in Scandinavian archives that apparently proved that Guru Nanak had visited Bergen in Norway as part of his world-wide journeys, which apparently included the guru and his companions, Mardana and Bala, passing through Scandinavia. Harpal's claims were met with confusion, curiosity, and skepticism from the local Sikh congregation but Harpal stated that European travellers and historians had apparently written about Guru Nanak's visit to Bergen, they just needed to locate and translate these records for evidence. Scholar Kristina Myrvold notes that Harpal made use of diasporic Sikh connections and activities and attempted to link them to the first Sikh guru, rather than focusing on uncovering history in the Punjabi homeland. She further states that Harpal attempted to bridge the temporal and spatial differences between varying localities and if his theory was true, would give Scandinavian Sikhs a historical antecedent in their country of settlement.
