= Khairpur Tamiwali Tehsil =

Coordinates: 29.5800°N 72.2328°E

Khairpur Tamiwali Tehsil تحصیل خیر پور ٹامیوالی
- Tehsil
- Location of Khairpur Tamiwali Tehsil in Punjab, Pakistan
- Country: Pakistan
- Province: (Punjab, Pakistan) Jallah Jeem
- District: Bahawalpur
- Capital: Khairpur Tamewali

Government
  - MNA: Mian Riaz Husain Pirzada
  - MPA: Mian Kazim Ali pirzada
  - Editor of Page: Muhammad Imran Haidery

Area
  - Tehsil: 993 km^{2} (383 sq mi)

Population (2023)
  - Tehsil: 290,582
  - Density: 293/km^{2} (758/sq mi)
  - Urban: 47,284 (16.27%)
  - Rural: 243,298 (83.73%)

Literacy (2023)
  - Literacy rate: 45.82%
- Time zone: UTC+5 (PST)

Khairpur Tamewali Tehsil (Urdu: تحصیل خیر پور ٹامیوالی) is an administrative tehsil (subdivision) of Bahawalpur District in the Punjab province of Pakistan. The city of Khairpur Tamewali is the tehsil headquarters which is administratively subdivided into eight union councils.

== Organisation and demographics ==
Khairpur Tamewali Tehsil's municipal administration is headed by the Tehsil Municipal Administrator while TMOs are also available to monitor developmental, sanitary, and infra-structure projects.

The main administrative districts are Khairpur Tamewali, Behli, Guddan, Inaiti, Israni, Jhandani, Kotla Qaim Khan and Syed Imam Shah.

Khairpur Tamewali is used for military training purposes due to its geographical area. Most of the desert area is under the control of the Pakistan Army. There is also a military airbase which is used to train multiple air forces including those of Saudi Arabia, Egypt, United Arab Emirates, China, Oman and Pakistan.

Languages include Saraiki, Punjabi, and Urdu.

Shrine of famous Sufi saint Peer Syed Ghulam Mohyudin Gillani (Peer Syed Chup Shah Sarkar) is located near Khairpur Tamiwali Police Station, he is one of the descendants of Ghaus Pak Abdul Qadir Gillani and also from the family of Muhammad. His son Chan Peer is also interred with him.

Another ancient 200+ years old Shrine of Syed Badar Shah Gillani is present nearby.

Hazrat Khawaja Khuda Bux shrine is also famous for its annual event gatherings for Mela (Urs Khwaja Khuda Bux).

== Demographics ==
=== Population ===
Historical population
Year	Pop.	±% p.a.
1951	51,820	—
1961	60,824	+1.61%
1972	91,412	+3.77%
1981	117,133	+2.79%
1998	184,914	+2.72%
2017	262,923	+1.87%
2023	290,582	+1.68%

As of the 2023 census, Khairpur Tamiwali Tehsil has population of 290,582.

== Languages ==
Saraiki is the base language of Khairpur Tamewali To communicate Mostly spoken languages are Saraiki, Urdu, Punjabi
