= Jodhe =

- Village
- Location in Punjab, India Jodhe (India)
- Country: India
- State: Punjab
- District: Amritsar

Government
  - Type: Panchyati Raj
  - Body: Panchyat

Languages
  - Official: Punjabi
- Time zone: UTC+5:30 (IST)
- PIN: 143204

Jodhe is a village located near the Beas River. It is surrounded by four villages: Bal Sarai, Sathiala, Butala and Seron. Most of the population residing here work as farmers and mostly live on farms.

== History ==
Jodhe borrows its name from the fact that great warriors were born at this place. That why it is called Jodhe (Warriors).

== Gurdwara Baba Batha Sahib Ji ==
Gurdwara Baba Batha Sahib Ji - Jodhe is a religious place in the name of 108 Baba Gopal Das Ji. A fair (Mela) is held twice a year in the months of March and August.
