= Nadu Shah Labana =

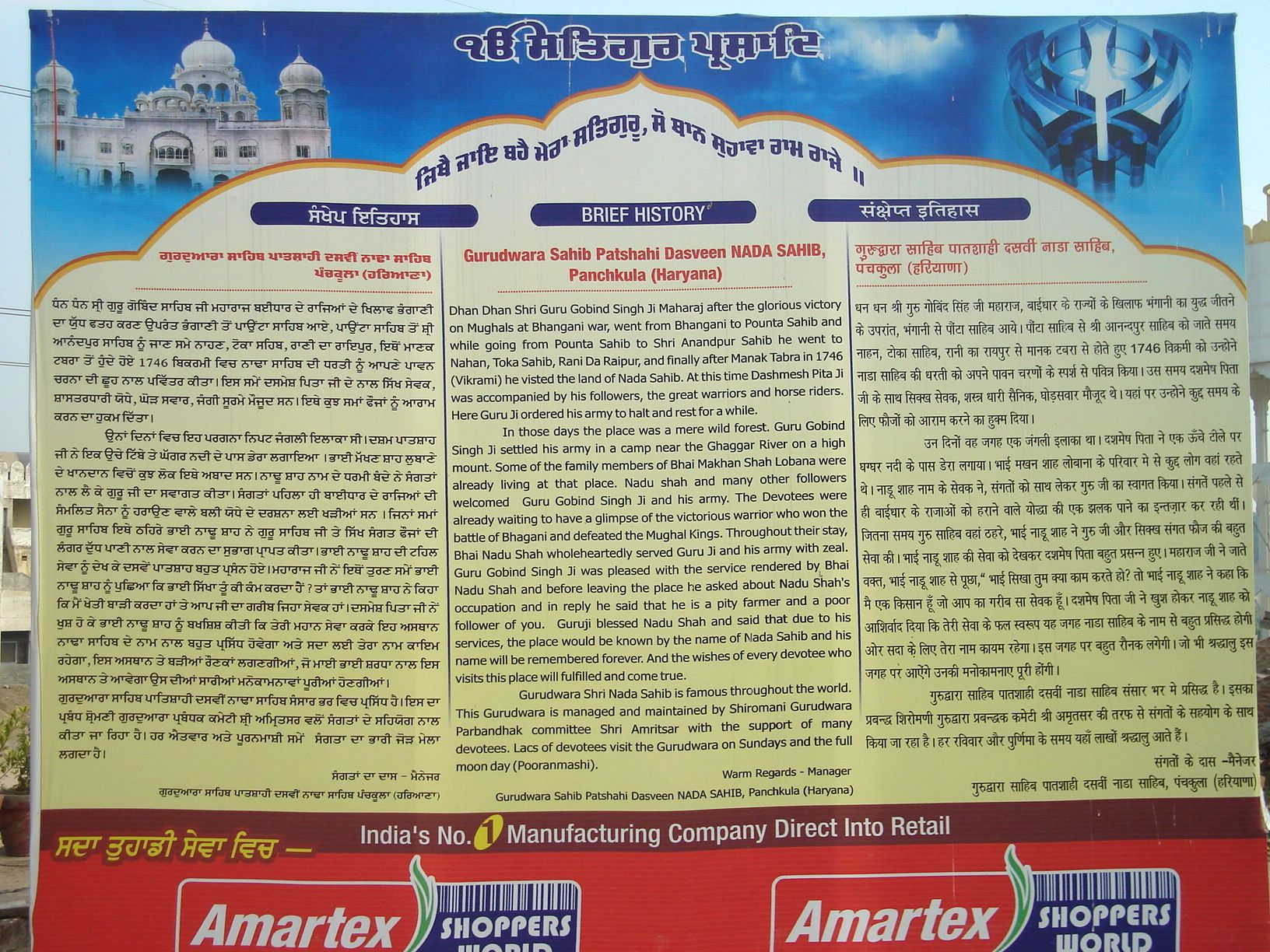
History of Nadu Shah in English, Hindi and Punjabi, History board at Gurdwara Nada Sahib

Nadu Shah Labana, is an important Sikh figure, who was Sikh Devotee of Guru Gobind Singh known for his service in Battle of Bhangani at Nadha near Panchkula. Guru Gobind Singh prophesied that this place would become a place of pilgrimage, and it would be called after the name of Nadha Shah. Gurdwara Nada Sahib is place commemorates his service.

== See also ==
- Labana Sikh
