= Lubanki dialect =

Extinct Indo-Aryan language

Lubanki
- Labanki
- Native to: India and Pakistan
- Region: Punjab
- Ethnicity: Labana
- Extinct: (date missing)
- Language family: Indo-European: Indo-Iranian; Indo-Aryan; Northwestern; Punjabic; Lahnda; Lubanki

Language codes
- ISO 639-3: None (mis)
- Glottolog: None

Lubanki, also known as Labanki or Lubani, is an extinct Indo-Aryan dialect that was formerly spoken by the Labana tribe in Punjab. The dialect is named thus because it was used by the Labana tribe.

The dialect consisted of a mixture of different vernaculars. Some unique words were gauri (cow), chhora (son), bhut (devil), bhau (brother), dasa (hole), ladho, and baro. The dialect went into decline after the Lubana tribe started settling into a sedentary lifestyle. In 1941, the weekly newspaper Prem Sandesh edited by Bawa Harnam Singh spoke against the dialect and other aspects of Labana culture, such as ghagra, choli, various ornaments, purdah, and other cultural aspects.

Some Lubanki words are preserved within the Guru Granth Sahib, such as in the following phrases:

- tu bharo thakar mera (page 622)
- ih jag tago sut ko bhai (page 635)
- min pakr phankio ar Katio randh kio bahu bani (page 658 )
- sant jana ka chhora tis charni lag (page 811)
- phuto anda bharam ka manaih bhaio pargas (page 1002)
