= Sandlas =

Sandlas is an Indian surname lubana community who were traditionally salt trading and merchants community. Notable people with the surname include:

- Jasmine Sandlas, Indian-American singer and television personality
- V. P. Sandlas (1945–2017), Indian space scientist

== See also ==
- Sandla (disambiguation)
