= Sikhism in Sweden =

Sikhism in Sweden Sikhismen i Sverige

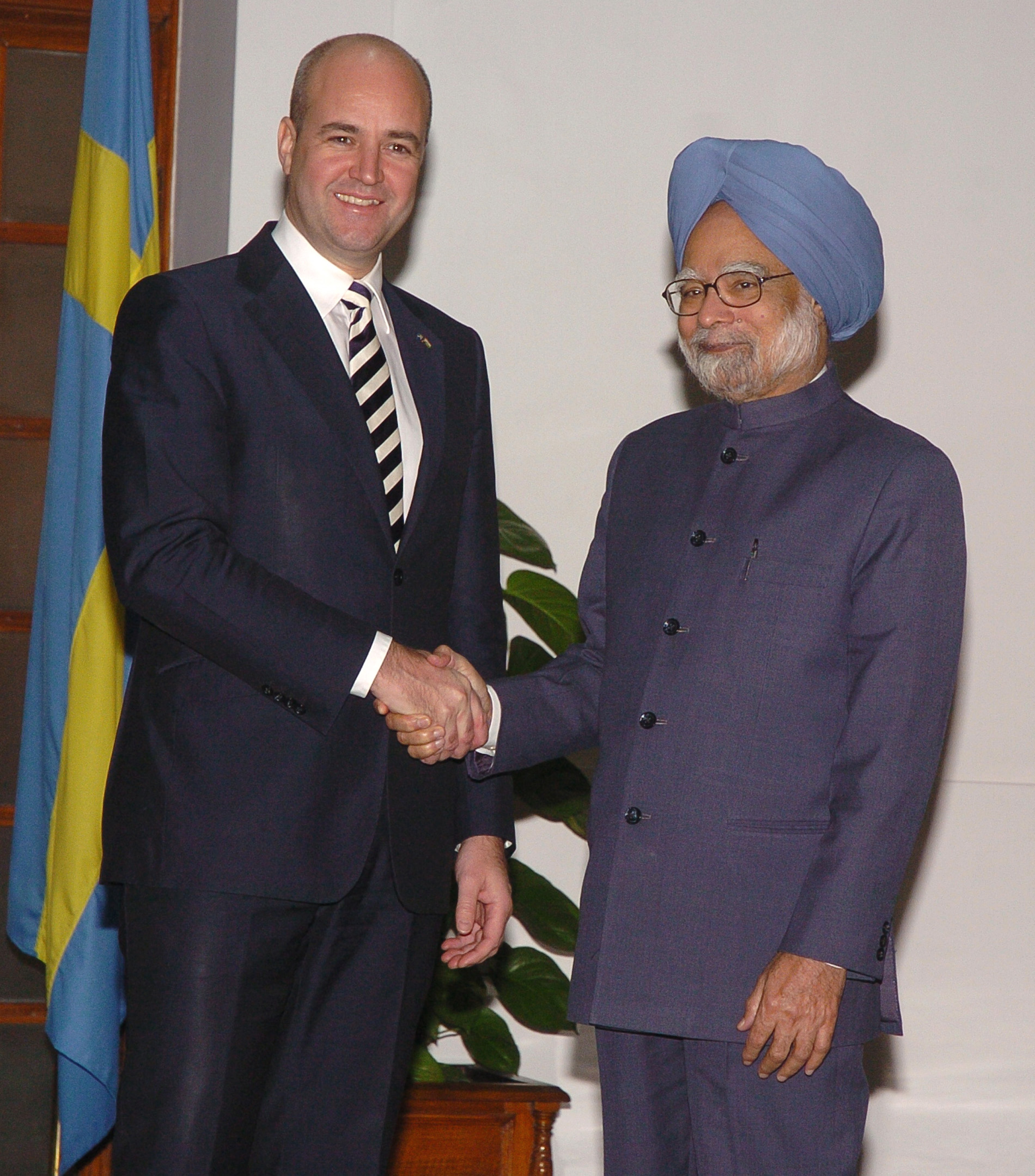
- The First Sikh Prime Minister of India, Dr. Manmohan Singh meeting the Prime Minister of Sweden, Fredrik Reinfeld (2009)

Total population
- 4,000

Regions with significant populations
- Stockholm · Gothenburg

Religions
- Sikhism

Languages
- Punjabi · Swedish

Sikhism in Sweden (Swedish: Sikhismen i Sverige) is a very small religious minority, there are approximately 4,000 adherents, most of which are settled in Stockholm and Gothenburg, each of which has two gurdwaras.

== History ==
According to Kristina Myrvold, Associate Professor of Religious Studies at Linnaeus University, "The Sikhs started coming to Sweden as economic migrants and refugees in the 1970s."

== Gurdwaras ==
Gurdwaras in Sweden include:

- Gurdwara Sangat Sahib Forening, Botkyrka, Tullinge, Stockholm
- Gurdwara Sri Guru Singh Sabha, Angered
- Sikh Cultural Association, Hjällbo, Gothenburg
- Sikh Temple Sweden —Gurudwara Bibi Nanki Ji, Stockholm
