= Sathiala =

- Village
- Interactive map of Sathiala
- Coordinates: 31°33′18″N 75°15′56″E
- Country: India
- State: Punjab
- District: Amritsar

Government
  - Type: Democracy
  - Body: Government of India
- Elevation: 234 m (768 ft)

Languages
  - Official: Punjabi
- Time zone: UTC+5:30 (IST)
- PIN: 143205
- Vehicle registration: PB-02
- Coastline: 0 kilometres (0 mi)
- Website: www.sathiala.com

Sathiala is a village located in the Amritsar District, in the Indian state of Punjab. It is located 5 km from Beas.
