= Lakhi Rai Jadhaun =

Lakhi Rai Bhatti was a ruler of Khairpur (now called Khairpur Tamewali), in Bahawalpur, Pakistan. Later his state was captured by the Baloch tribes with the support of Ahmad Shah Abdali in 18th century. Raav is the Indian title for kings used in medieval India.

== Historical Evidence ==
The matrimonial alliance between the rulers of Alipur and Khairpur is documented as —

Chadi janet pur ali thin, dhuki Khairpur beech

Dekhan Aaye baraat ko, gaon thi uch aur neech

Teer Satdrav (Sutlej) nadi k base Khairpur gaon

Lakhi Rai teh Dhaan rahe Jadubansi Raav (King)

— Written by Bhatt Sewa Singh Kaushish in Shaheed Bilas Bhai Mani Singh
