= Baba Bakala =

- town
- Location in Punjab, India Baba Bakala (India)
- Coordinates: 31°33′18″N 75°15′56″E
- Country: India
- State: Punjab
- Region: Punjab
- District: Amritsar
- Tehsil: Baba Bakala

Population (2020)
  - Total: 8,946

Languages
  - Official: Punjabi (Gurmukhi)
  - Regional: Punjabi
- Time zone: UTC+5:30 (IST)
- PIN: 143201
- Vehicle registration: PB-17
- Amritsar city: Amritsar
- Vidhan Sabha constituency: 25

Baba Bakala is a historical town and tehsil in the Amritsar district in Punjab, India. It is known as the location of Gurdwara Baba Bakala Sahib.

== History ==
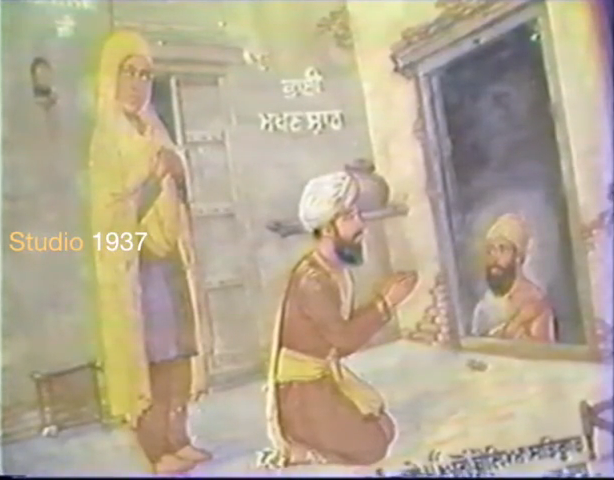
Fresco depicting Bhai Makhan Shah Labana finding Guru Tegh Bahadur, with Mata Nanaki, from Gurdwara Baba Bakala

Baba Bakala Sahib is closely associated with the ninth guru of the Sikhs, Guru Tegh Bahadur. The guru is said to have meditated here for 20 years. There is a Gurdwara at the site commemorating this.

Baba Bakala Sahib was originally known as Bakkan-Wala (meaning 'Town of the Deer' in Persian). However, overtime the name was shortened to Bakala. The town was originally a mound, where deer were found grazing.

Before dying in Delhi, the guru at the time, Guru Har Krishan uttered "Baba Bakale" which the Sikhs at the time interpreted as meaning that the guru's successor was to be found at the town of Bakala, close to Amritsar. Once the next guru was found, the phrase "Baba Bakale" evolved into the official name of the town, Baba Bakala sahib.

== Geography ==
Baba Bakala is located at 31°33′18″N 75°15′56″E, on Batala Road, near Amritsar, Punjab, India. The town is located only 43 km (26.7 miles) from the Golden Temple in the city of Amritsar, 46.5 km (28.9 miles) northwest of Jalandhar and 193 km (120.5 miles) northwest of the state's capital of Chandigarh.

== Demographics ==
According to the 2011 census of India, the population of Baba Bakala is 8,946. There are 1,834 households, 4,697 males and 4,249 females. Thus the corresponding sex ratio is 905 women per 1000 men.

=== Religion ===
Sikhism is the most prominent religion of the town. Other minorities includes Hinduism and Jainism. Bhullar Jatts and Shukla Pandits were the original inhabitants of the town when it was founded as a village. There were few Muslim households, who migrated elsewhere during the 1947 Partition of India.

The table below shows the population of different religious groups in Baba Bakala town, as of 2011 census.

Population by religious groups in Baba Bakala town, 2011 census
Religion	Total	Female	Male
Sikh	8,232	3,921	4,311
Hindu	649	298	351
Christian	25	11	14
Muslim	8	3	5
Not stated	32	16	16
Total	8,946	4,249	4,697

== Politics ==
The city is part of the Baba Bakala Assembly Constituency.
