= Labana =

Merchant and transportation community in India

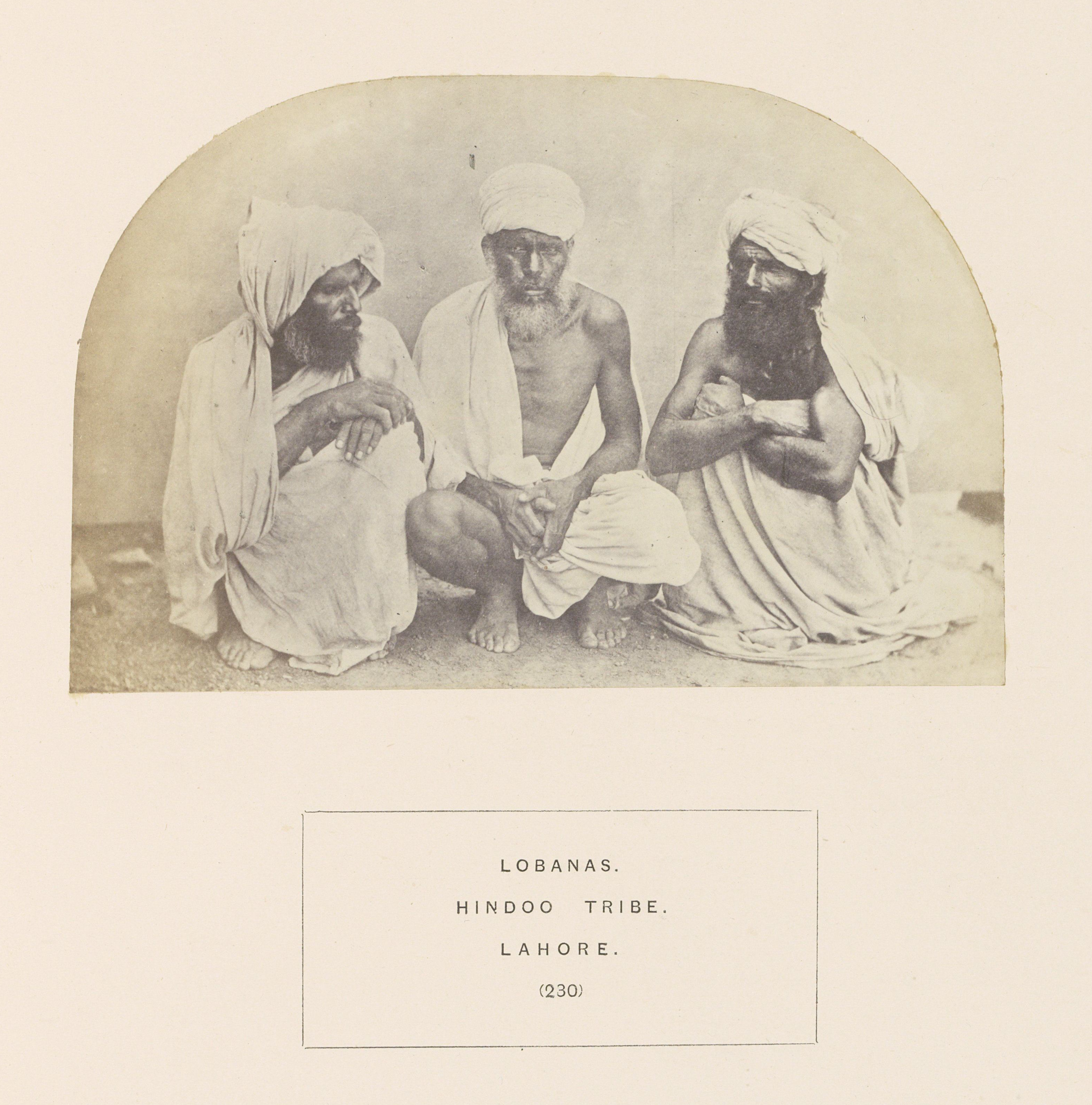
Portrait of three unidentified people of the Labana tribe of Lahore, ca.1862–72

Labana (also spelled Lubana, Lavana, Lubhana; lit. 'salt trader') is a merchant and transportation community in India engaged in maritime trade and land trade, which includes trading and transportation of goods such as saltpetre, silk, diamonds, etc. In the Punjab region, during socio-economic reforms, Labanas overwhelmingly became agriculturists. The Labanas of Punjab and Haryana are mostly Sikhs and Hindus and mainly speak Punjabi or Hindi.

== Etymology ==
The term "Lubana" is believed to be a combination of two words - "lūn," meaning "salt," and "bānā," meaning "trade." The Lubanas, as a community, were deeply involved in the transportation and trading of salt. They were also occasionally referred to as Banjaras.

== History ==
The history of the Lavana/Labana community traces back to their association with the salt trade and transportation, which influenced their name and occupation. The term 'Lubana' is believed to have derived from the Sanskrit word 'Lavan,' meaning salt. This connection is evident in the various historical references and cultural practices of the tribe.

According to Kahn Singh Nabha in Mahan Kosh, the term 'Lubana' is linked to the Sanskrit word 'Lavan,' signifying salt. Members of the Lubana tribe engaged in salt trading, suggesting that their name is closely related to their traditional business activities.

The connection between the Lubana tribe and salt-carrying is further supported by the work of Crooke. In his book Tribes and Castes of the North-Western India, Volume I, which was reprinted by Cosmo Publications in Delhi in 1974, he mentions that the Lubana tribe of Banjaras derived their name from their business of transporting salt.

Additionally, Gurcharan Singh highlights the popularity of a game called 'lun - Miani' among the Lubanas until 1947 AD. This game likely originated from their historical association with salt-carrying as it reflects their occupation in its name and nature.

Over the centuries, the Lubana community has evolved and diversified, engaging in various other professions and adapting to changing times. However, the historical connection to the salt trade remains an essential aspect of their identity and heritage.

The Labanas were a salt-carrying and salt-trading community in Punjab. Over time, they transitioned from their merchant work and shifted towards agriculture as their primary profession, becoming a landholding community since the times of Maharaja Ranjit Singh. Some Labanas claim that they are Gaur Brahmins who migrated to Punjab during the reign of Aurangzeb. The Labanas perform religious events with their own rituals.

== List of Lubanas ==
The Lavana are an endogamous community. They have eleven exogamous clans mentioned below:

- Dharawat
- Dhogan
- Multani
- Sandlas
- Basi
- Gundalia
- Datnawat
- Anderia
- Tageria
- Kalchana
- Baluda
- Lakhrond
- Bakrea

All these clans have equal status.

The community is traditionally associated with saltpetre trading, but many are now farmers, agricultural and traders.

== See also ==
- Lubanki dialect
- Lavana
