= Belgium men's national field hockey team =

Men's national field hockey team representing Belgium

Belgium
- Nickname(s): Red Lions
- Association: Royal Belgian Hockey Association
- Confederation: EHF (Europe)
- Head Coach: Shane McLeod
- Assistant coach(es): Steve Bayer; Craig Sieben
- Manager: Muriel Peché; Lionel Sapart
- Captain: Arthur Van Doren
Home	Away

FIH ranking
- Current: 2 (6 November 2026)
- Highest: 1 (December 2018 – June 2019, January 2020 – June 2021, June 2026 – August 2026)
- Lowest: 14 (2003–04)

Olympic Games
- Appearances: 16 (first in 1920)
- Best result: (gold) 1st (2020)

World Cup
- Appearances: 8 (first in 1973)
- Best result: (gold) 1st (2018)

European Championship
- Appearances: 19 (first in 1970)
- Best result: (gold) 1st (2019)
Medal record
Event	1st	2nd	3rd
Olympic Games	1	1	1
World Cup	1	1	0
European Championship	1	2	3
Hockey World League	0	1	0
Pro League	2	3	1
Sultan Azlan Shah Cup	1	0	0
Champions Challenge	1	0	1
Total	7	8	6
Olympic Games
Gold medal – first place	2020 Tokyo	Team
Silver medal – second place	2016 Rio de Janeiro	Team
Bronze medal – third place	1920 Antwerp	Team
World Cup
Gold medal – first place	2018 Bhubaneswar	
Silver medal – second place	2023 Bhubaneswar–Rourkela	
European Championship
Gold medal – first place	2019 Antwerp	
Silver medal – second place	2013 Boom	
Silver medal – second place	2017 Amstelveen	
Bronze medal – third place	2007 Manchester	
Bronze medal – third place	2021 Amstelveen	
Bronze medal – third place	2023 Mönchengladbach	
FIH Hockey World League
Silver medal – second place	2014–15 Raipur	
Champions Challenge
Gold medal – first place	2011 Johannesburg	
Bronze medal – third place	2005 Alexandria	
FIH Pro League
Gold medal – first place	2021 Antwerp	
Gold medal – first place	2026 Wavre	
Silver medal – second place	2019 Amstelveen	
Silver medal – second place	2022 London	
Silver medal – second place	2025 Antwerp	
Bronze medal – third place	2023 Antwerp	
Sultan Azlan Shah Cup
Gold medal – first place	2025 Ipoh	

The Belgian national men's field hockey team represents Belgium in international men's field hockey and is controlled by the Royal Belgian Hockey Association, the governing body for field hockey in Belgium.

Belgium won the Men's Hockey World Cup in 2018, the European Championship in 2019, the 2020-21 FIH Pro League and the gold medal at 2020 Tokyo Olympics. They also won a silver medal at the 2023 Bhubaneswar & Rourkela and 2016 Rio de Janeiro and a bronze medal at the 1920 Antwerp Summer Olympics. They reached eight semi-finals at the European Championship since 1995, including a third place in 2007, 2021, 2023 and runners-up in 2013 and 2017.

They also have won, in 2025, the Sultan Azlan Shah Cup, by defeating India 1–0 in the final. This is their first title in this invitational tournament.

== History ==
Hockey was introduced in Belgium in 1902. The country's first club was founded in 1904. In 1907, several clubs established the Belgian Hockey Association. Belgium played its first international match against Germany, and was one of the founding members of the International Hockey Federation (FIH).

Between 1920 and 1978, Belgium appeared in two of the first three World Cups and in eleven out of thirteen Summer Olympics. After the successful early years (before the 1950s) with three times being among the best five at the Summer Olympics, it would last six decades before Belgium reached the international field hockey top again from the 1990s on.

By the early 2000s, the Royal Belgian Hockey Association started to invest heavily in the youth and modernized its structures. In 2007, Belgium won the bronze medal at the European Championship, a first in the country's history. Belgium also qualified for the 2008 Summer Olympics, for the first time in 32 years.

Belgium won a silver medal at the 2016 Summer Olympics, a second medal after Belgium ended third at the 1920 Summer Olympics in Antwerp. Two years later Belgium won the 2018 Hockey World Cup. It was the first major international title in the country's history. A year later Belgium won the gold medal at the European Championship which was held in Antwerp. They secured their second consecutive olympic medal through reaching the gold medal match at the 2020 Summer Olympics.

== Honours ==
Summer Olympics
(gold) First place: 2020
(silver) Second place: 2016
(bronze) Third place: 1920

World Cup
(gold) First place: 2018
(silver) Second place: 2023
European Championship
(gold) First place: 2019
(silver) Second place: 2013, 2017
(bronze) Third place: 2007, 2021, 2023

FIH Pro League
(gold) First place: 2020–21, 2025–26
(silver) Second place: 2019, 2021–22, 2024–25
(bronze) Third place: 2022–23

Hockey World League
(silver) Second place: 2014–15

Sultan Azlan Shah Cup
(gold) First place: 2025

Champions Challenge
(gold) First place: 2011
(bronze) Third place: 2005

Belgian National Sports Merit Award
Winners: 1959, 2019

Belgian Sportsteam of the Year
Winners: 2012, 2016, 2018, 2019

Note : The years about the medal templates of the FIH Pro League indicate in which year the last match was played. The place indicate in which place the last match of the team was played.

== Tournament history ==
A red box around the year indicates a tournament played within Belgium.

=== Summer Olympics ===
Gold Silver Bronze Fourth place

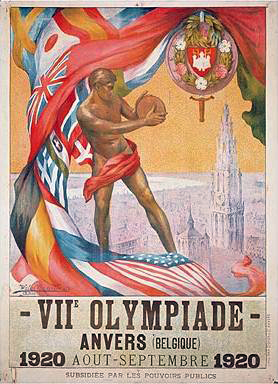
In 1920, Belgium's field hockey team won the bronze medal at home, at the Olympic Stadium in Antwerp.

Olympic Games record
Year	Round	Position	Pld	W	D*	L	GF	GA
(United Kingdom) 1908	did not participate							
(Sweden) 1912	Not held							
(Belgium) 1920	3rd place match	3rd	3	1	0	2	6	19
(France) 1924	Not held							
(Netherlands) 1928	3rd place match	4th	5	3	0	2	8	12
(United States) 1932	did not participate							
(Nazi Germany) 1936	Group phase	9th	3	0	2	1	5	8
(United Kingdom) 1948	Group phase	5th	4	2	0	2	6	8
(Finland) 1952	Second round	9th	2	1	0	1	6	1
(Australia) 1956	Group phase	7th	3	0	1	2	0	5
(Italy) 1960	Group phase	11th	5	1	1	3	7	9
(Japan) 1964	Group phase	11th	7	2	2	3	10	13
(Mexico) 1968	Group phase	9th	8	4	1	3	17	9
(West Germany) 1972	Group phase	10th	8	2	1	5	9	16
(Canada) 1976	Group phase	9th	6	3	0	3	11	19
(Soviet Union) 1980	did not qualify							
(United States) 1984	did not qualify							
(South Korea) 1988	did not qualify							
(Spain) 1992	did not qualify							
(United States) 1996	did not qualify							
(Australia) 2000	did not qualify							
(Greece) 2004	did not qualify							
(China) 2008	Group phase	9th	6	2	1	3	12	13
(United Kingdom) 2012	Group phase	5th	6	3	1	2	13	9
(Brazil) 2016	Final	2nd	8	6	0	2	29	11
(Japan) 2020	Final	1st	8	6	2	0	35	13
(France) 2024	Quarterfinals	5th	6	4	1	1	17	10
(United States) 2028	Qualified							
Total	Best: Champion	17/26	88	40	13	35	291	173

=== World Cup ===
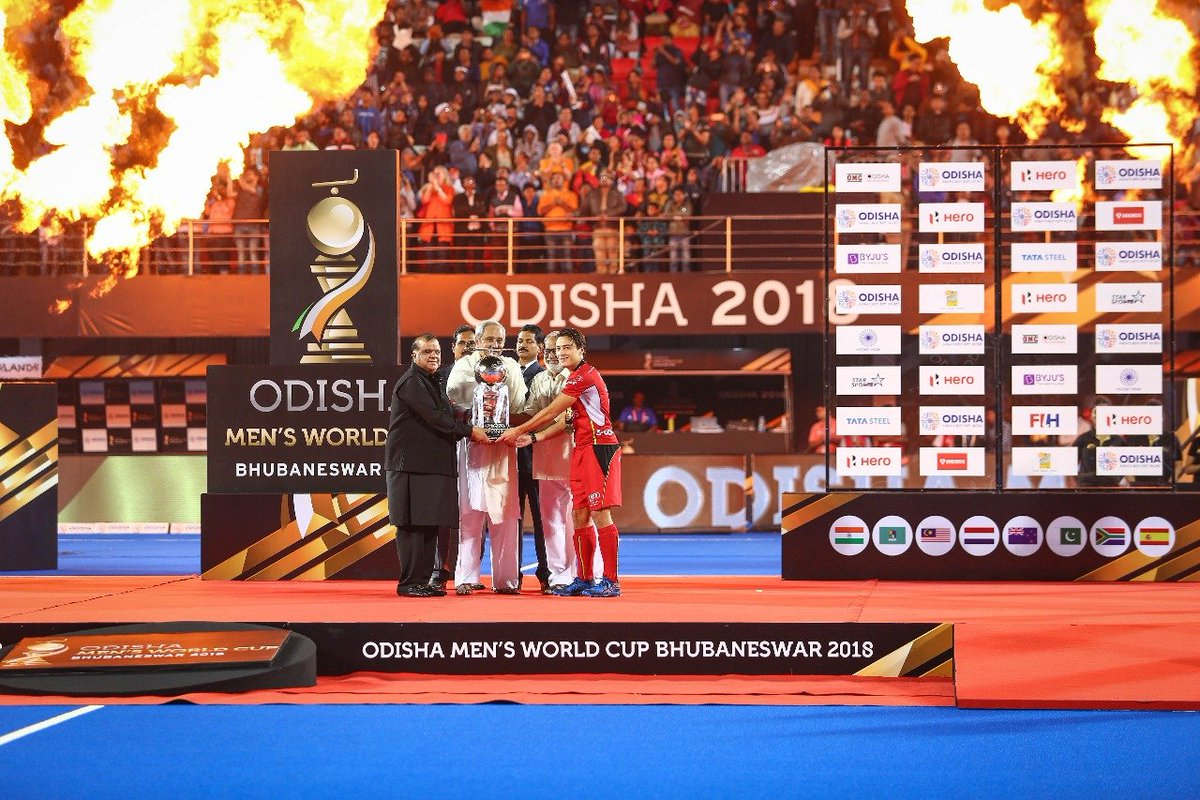
Belgium captain Thomas Briels lifting the 2018 World Cup trophy

Champions Runners-up Third place Fourth place

FIH World Cup record
Year	Round	Position	Pld	W	D*	L	GF	GA
(Spain) 1971	did not participate							
(Netherlands) 1973	Group phase	8th	5	2	0	3	8	12
(Malaysia) 1975	did not participate							
(Argentina) 1978	Group phase	14th	6	1	2	3	12	18
(India) 1982	did not participate							
(England) 1986	did not participate							
(Pakistan) 1990	did not participate							
(Australia) 1994	Group phase	11th	5	0	1	4	6	26
(Netherlands) 1998	did not qualify							
(Malaysia) 2002	Group phase	14th	7	0	0	7	7	23
(Germany) 2006	did not qualify							
(India) 2010	did not qualify							
(Netherlands) 2014	5th–6th play-off	5th	6	4	0	2	21	13
(India) 2018	Final	1st	7	5	2	0	22	5
(India) 2023	Final	2nd	6	3	3	0	21	8
(Belgium) (Netherlands) 2026	7th–8th play-off	7th	6	2	3	1	13	11
Total	Best: Winners	7/15	48	17	11	20	110	116

=== European Championship ===
Champions Runners-up Third place Fourth place

European Championship Record
Year	Round	Position	Pld	W	D*	L	GF	GA
(Belgium) 1970	Second round	5th	7	6	0	1	18	7
(Spain) 1974	Group phase	10th	6	2	1	3	7	9
(West Germany) 1978	did not participate							
(Netherlands) 1983	Group phase	8th	7	2	1	4	8	17
(Soviet Union) 1987	Group phase	10th	7	1	3	3	14	21
(France) 1991	Group phase	9th	7	4	0	3	14	17
(Republic of Ireland) 1995	3rd place match	4th	7	3	2	2	12	8
(Italy) 1999	3rd place match	4th	7	4	0	3	19	28
(Spain) 2003	Group phase	6th	7	2	2	3	21	21
(Germany) 2005	3rd place match	4th	5	1	1	3	6	20
(England) 2007	3rd place match	3rd	5	2	2	1	16	14
(Netherlands) 2009	Group phase	5th	5	3	0	2	22	11
(Germany) 2011	3rd place match	4th	5	2	0	3	14	12
(Belgium) 2013	Final	2nd	5	3	1	1	12	6
(England) 2015	Group phase	5th	5	3	1	1	20	13
(Netherlands) 2017	Final	2nd	5	2	1	2	13	9
(Belgium) 2019	Final	1st	5	5	0	0	22	2
(Netherlands) 2021	3rd place match	3rd	5	3	1	1	19	10
(Germany) 2023	3rd place match	3rd	5	4	0	1	17	8
(Germany) 2025	Group phase	5th	5	3	0	2	22	9
(England) 2027	Qualified							
Total	1 title	20/21	110	55	16	39	295	245

=== FIH Pro League ===
Champions Runners-up Third place Fourth place

*There are no rounds in this competition because the teams play in a round-robin format.

FIH Pro League record
Year	Round	Position	Pld	W	D*	L	GF	GA
(Netherlands) 2019	Final*	2nd	16	9	3	4	57	33
2020–21	Final*	1st	14	9	3	2	40	26
2021–22	Final*	2nd	16	10	4	2	52	25
2022–23	3rd place match*	3rd	16	10	0	6	42	37
2023–24	5th place match*	5th	16	7	2	7	41	39
2024–25	Final*	2nd	16	8	4	4	53	39
2025–26	Final*	1st	16	13	2	1	59	27
Total	Best: Champions	7/7	110	59	18	26	344	226

=== Hockey World League (defunct) ===
Winners Runners-up Third place Fourth place

Hockey World League record
Year	Position	Round	Pld	W	D*	L	GF	GA
2012–13	5th	Round 2	5	5	0	0	44	6
2012–13	5th	Semifinal	6	4	2	0	18	9
2012–13	5th	Final	6	1	2	3	9	10
2014–15	2nd	Semifinal	7	5	1	1	21	8
2014–15	2nd	Final	6	3	1	2	14	9
2016–17	5th	Semifinal	7	6	0	1	37	8
2016–17	5th	Final	5	4	0	1	15	5
Total	Best: 2nd	Final	42	28	6	8	158	55

=== Champions Trophy (defunct) ===
Winners Runners-up Third place Fourth place

Champions Trophy record
Year	Round	Position	Pld	W	D*	L	GF	GA
(Pakistan) 1978 until (New Zealand) 2011	did not participate							
(Australia) 2012	First round	5th	6	2	0	4	15	16
(India) 2014	Second round	8th	6	1	3	2	13	15
(United Kingdom) 2016	Second round	5th	6	2	2	2	13	15
(Netherlands) 2018	Second round	5th	6	1	4	1	12	15
Total	Best: 5th place	4/37	24	6	9	9	53	61

=== Champions Challenge (defunct) ===
Winners Runners-up Third place Fourth place

Champions Challenge record
Year	Round	Position	Pld	W	D*	L	GF	GA
(Malaysia) 2001	5th–6th play-off	6th	6	0	0	6	6	18
(South Africa) 2003	did not participate							
(Egypt) 2005	3rd place match	3rd	6	3	2	1	26	17
(Belgium) 2007	5th–6th play-off	6th	6	1	1	4	13	21
(Australia) 2009	7th–8th play-off	7th	5	2	0	3	13	9
(South Africa) 2011	Final	1st	6	4	2	0	22	12
(Argentina) 2012	did not participate							
(Malaysia) 2014	did not participate							
Total	Best: Winners	5/8	32	13	5	14	80	77

=== Sultan Azlan Shah Cup ===
Winners Runners-up Third place Fourth place

Sultan Azlan Shah Cup record
Year	Round	Position	Pld	W	D*	L	GF	GA
(Malaysia) 1983 until (Malaysia) 2007	did not participate							
(Malaysia) 2008	5th–6th play-off	6th	7	2	0	5	18	21
(Malaysia) 2009 until (Malaysia) 2024	did not participate							
(Malaysia) 2025	Final	1st	6	5	1	0	25	7
(Malaysia) 2026	did not participate							
Total	Best: Winners	2/31	13	7	1	5	43	28

*Draws include matches decided on a penalty shoot-out.

== Results and fixtures ==
The following is a list of match results in the last 12 months, as well as any future matches that have been scheduled.

Win Draw Loss Fixture

=== 2025–26 ===
10 February 2026 India Leg	Belgium	5–3	Argentina	Rourkela, India
19:30	Boon 15', 30', 58'; Hellin 32'; Hendrickx 53'	Report	Domene 2', 24'; Della Torre 9'	Stadium: Birsa Munda International Hockey Stadium

11 February 2026 India Leg	India	1–3	Belgium	Rourkela, India
19:30	Lakra 29'	Report	Onana 23'; Crols 53'; Van Dessel 57'	Stadium: Birsa Munda International Hockey Stadium

13 February 2026 India Leg	Argentina	2–5	Belgium	Rourkela, India
19:30	Domene 19'; Rey 45'	Report	Sloover 36'; Biekens 39'; Hendrickx 49', 54'; Duvekot 55'	Stadium: Birsa Munda International Hockey Stadium

14 February 2026 India Leg	India	2–4	Belgium	Rourkela, India
19:30	Aditya 24'; Harmanpreet 37'	Report	Labouchere 11'; Hendrickx 14', 17'; Sloover 15'	Stadium: Birsa Munda International Hockey Stadium

13 June 2026 Belgium Leg	Belgium	7–1	Pakistan	Wavre, Belgium
15:30	Onana 3'; Stockbroekx 38'; Hendrickx 42'; Biekens 50', 55'; Hellin 51'; Boon 55'	Report	Rana 33'	Stadium: Stade Justin Peeters

16 June 2026 Belgium Leg	Belgium	3–1	Spain	Wavre, Belgium
21:00	Boon 32'; Hendrickx 44'; Stockbroekx 47'	Report	Vizcaino 33'	Stadium: Stade Justin Peeters

18 June 2026 Belgium Leg	Belgium	6–0	Pakistan	Wavre, Belgium
21:00	de Kerpel 1'; Boon 17', 23', 46'; Foubert 41'; Labouchere 50'	Report		Stadium: Stade Justin Peeters

21 June 2026 Belgium Leg	Belgium	3–2	Spain	Wavre, Belgium
14:00	Stockbroekx 35'; Hendrickx 42'; Boon 56'	Report	Basterra 43'; Fortuño 54'	Stadium: Stade Justin Peeters

24 June 2026 Belgium Leg	Belgium	2–2 (4–3 p)	Netherlands	Wavre, Belgium
21:00	Hendrickx 3'; Boon 53'	Report	Van der Heijden 15', 16'	Stadium: Stade Justin Peeters
	Penalties
	Boon (penalty shoot-out missed); Sloover (penalty shoot-out scored); Wegnez (penalty shoot-out scored) van Dessel (penalty shoot-out scored) van Oost (penalty shoot-out scored)		(penalty shoot-out missed) de Mol; (penalty shoot-out missed) de Geus; (penalty shoot-out scored) Middendorp; (penalty shoot-out scored) Veen; (penalty shoot-out scored) Reyenga

25 June 2026 Belgium Leg	Belgium	1–2	Australia	Wavre, Belgium
21:00	Boon 32'	Report	Welch 36'; Ephraums 50'	Stadium: Stade Justin Peeters

27 June 2026 Belgium Leg	Belgium	2–1	Netherlands	Wavre, Belgium
19:00	Hendrickx 15+'; Boon 17'	Report	Reyenga 36'	Stadium: Stade Justin Peeters

28 June 2026 Belgium Leg	Belgium	5–4	Australia	Wavre, Belgium
17:00	Crols 30'; Boon 39', 50', 54'; Hendrickx 42'	Report	Beltz 8'; Burns 11'; Brand 14'; Welch 29'	Stadium: Stade Justin Peeters

15 August 2026 2026 WC Pool B	Belgium	3–2	France	Wavre, Belgium
21:00	Onana 17'; Duvekot 44'; Hendrickx 56'	Report	Curty 3'; Vaal 18'	Stadium: Belfius Hockey Arena

17 August 2026 2026 WC Pool B	Germany	1–0	Belgium	Wavre, Belgium
20:30	Brilla 39'	Report		Stadium: Belfius Hockey Arena

19 August 2026 2026 WC Pool B	Belgium	5–3	Malaysia	Wavre, Belgium
20:30	Boon 17', 20', 36', 53'; Stockbroekx 43'	Report	Rozemi 32'; Jalil 37'; Anuar 53'	Stadium: Belfius Hockey Arena

21 August 2026 2026 WC Pool F	Australia	1–1	Belgium	Wavre, Belgium
20:30	Craig 23'	Report	Boon 37'	Stadium: Belfius Hockey Arena

23 August 2026 2026 WC Pool F	Spain	1–1	Belgium	Wavre, Belgium
20:30	Miralles 46'	Report	Van Doren 4'	Stadium: Belfius Hockey Arena

28 August 2026 2026 WC 7th place match	India	3–3 (3–4 p)	Belgium	Wavre, Belgium
17:00	Abhishek 6'; Harmanpreet 31', 60'	Report	Duvekot 22'; Labouchere 23' de Sloover 47'	Stadium: Belfius Hockey Arena
	Penalties
	Harmanpreet (penalty shoot-out missed); Sukhjeet (penalty shoot-out missed); Lakra (penalty shoot-out scored); Dilpreet (penalty shoot-out scored); Abhishek (penalty shoot-out scored)		(penalty shoot-out scored) Boon; (penalty shoot-out missed) Foubert; (penalty shoot-out scored) de Sloover; (penalty shoot-out scored) Hendrickx; (penalty shoot-out scored) Duvekot

=== 2026–27 ===
14 December 2026 Spain Leg	Netherlands	v	Belgium	Valencia, Spain
14:30				Stadium: Estadio Betero

16 December 2026 Spain Leg	Belgium	v	Germany	Valencia, Spain
14:30				Stadium: Estadio Betero

17 December 2026 Spain Leg	Spain	v	Belgium	Valencia, Spain
20:30				Stadium: Estadio Betero

19 December 2026 Spain Leg	Belgium	v	Netherlands	Valencia, Spain
12:00				Stadium: Estadio Betero

20 December 2026 Spain Leg	Germany	v	Belgium	Valencia, Spain
15:30				Stadium: Estadio Betero

22 December 2026 Spain Leg	Spain	v	Belgium	Valencia, Spain
16:30				Stadium: Estadio Betero

13 February 2026 Australia Leg	Belgium	v	France	Gold Coast, Australia
12:30				Stadium: Gold Coast Hockey Centre

14 February 2027 Australia Leg	Australia	v	Belgium	Gold Coast, Australia
16:30				Stadium: Gold Coast Hockey Centre

20 February 2026 Australia Leg	France	v	Belgium	Gold Coast, Australia
12:30				Stadium: Gold Coast Hockey Centre

21 February 2027 Australia Leg	Australia	v	Belgium	Gold Coast, Australia
14:00				Stadium: Gold Coast Hockey Centre

12 June 2027 Belgium Leg	Belgium	v	Great Britain	Wavre, Belgium
20:00				Stadium: Belfius Hockey Arena

13 June 2027 Belgium Leg	Belgium	v	Great Britain	Wavre, Belgium
20:00				Stadium: Belfius Hockey Arena

19 June 2027 Belgium Leg	Belgium	v	Argentina	Wavre, Belgium
13:30				Stadium: Belfius Hockey Arena

20 June 2027 Belgium Leg	Belgium	v	Argentina	Wavre, Belgium
18:30				Stadium: Belfius Hockey Arena

26 June 2027 Belgium Leg	Belgium	v	India	Wavre, Belgium
18:30				Stadium: Belfius Hockey Arena

27 June 2027 Belgium Leg	Belgium	v	India	Wavre, Belgium
18:30				Stadium: Belfius Hockey Arena

29 July 2026 2027 EC Pool B	Belgium	v	France	London, England
15:00				Stadium: Lee Valley Hockey and Tennis Centre

31 July 2026 2027 EC Pool B	Netherlands	v	Belgium	London, England
17:15				Stadium: Lee Valley Hockey and Tennis Centre

3 August 2027 2027 EC Quarter-finals	Belgium	v	TBD	London, England
				Stadium: Lee Valley Hockey and Tennis Centre

6 August 2026 2027 EC TBD	Belgium	v	TBD	London, England
				Stadium: Twickenham Stoop

8 August 2026 2027 EC TBD	Belgium	v	TBD	London, England
				Stadium: Twickenham Stoop

== Team ==
=== Current squad ===
The following 25 players will be called up for the Training squad.

Caps and goals updated as of 28 August, after the match against India.

Head coach: Shane McLeod

No.	Pos.	Player	Date of birth (age)	Caps	Goals	Club
1	GK	Simon Vandenbroucke	6 June 1999 (age 27)	17	0	(Belgium) Waterloo Ducks
21	GK	Vincent Vanasch	21 December 1987 (age 38)	305	0	(Belgium) Léopold
4	DF	Arthur Van Doren	1 October 1994 (age 32)	294	22	(Belgium) Braxgata
9	DF	Maxime Van Oost	2 December 1999 (age 26)	92	1	(Belgium) Waterloo Ducks
11	DF	Tommy Willems	13 April 1997 (age 29)	68	4	(Belgium) Waterloo Ducks
12	DF	Nicolas Bogaerts	15 January 2004 (age 22)	0	0	(Belgium) Dragons
16	DF	Alexander Hendrickx	6 August 1993 (age 33)	237	194	(Belgium) Gantoise
19	DF	Hugo Labouchere	7 February 2004 (age 22)	16	4	(Netherlands) Pinoké
23	DF	Arthur De Sloover	3 May 1997 (age 29)	214	11	(Netherlands) Oranje-Rood
33	DF	Charles Langendries	26 April 2006 (age 20)	0	0	(Belgium) Waterloo Ducks
34	DF	Olivier Biekens	14 May 1999 (age 27)	30	0	(Netherlands) Amsterdam
5	MF	Arno Van Dessel	3 July 2003 (age 23)	82	4	(Netherlands) Bloemendaal
6	MF	Lucas Balthazar	8 January 2006 (age 20)	32	0	(Belgium) Uccle Sport
17	MF	Guillaume Hellin	28 May 2001 (age 25)	53	9	(Belgium) Gantoise
26	MF	Victor Wegnez	25 December 1995 (age 30)	214	28	(Belgium) Dragons
28	MF	Tobias Biekens	2 January 2001 (age 25)	37	3	(Belgium) Braxgata
32	MF	Jack Vloeberghs	15 October 2003 (age 23)	19	0	(Belgium) Herakles
7	FW	Thibeau Stockbroekx	20 July 2000 (age 26)	89	36	(Belgium) Braxgata
10	FW	Maximilian Langer	5 August 2006 (age 20)	0	0	(Netherlands) Bloemendaal
13	FW	Nicolas De Kerpel	23 March 1993 (age 33)	169	51	(Belgium) Herakles
18	FW	Roman Duvekot	21 June 2000 (age 26)	49	14	(Belgium) Gantoise
22	FW	Victor Foubert	12 October 2002 (age 24)	38	3	(Netherlands) Oranje-Rood
27	FW	Tom Boon	25 January 1990 (age 36)	397	347	(Belgium) Léopold
30	FW	Nelson Onana	1 March 2000 (age 26)	78	20	(Belgium) Léopold
37	FW	Thomas Crols	11 September 2003 (age 23)	44	7	(Belgium) Braxgata

=== Recent call-ups ===
The following players have been called up for the national team in the last 12 months.

Pos.	Player	Date of birth (age)	Caps	Goals	Club	Latest call-up
GK	Loic Van Doren	14 September 1996 (age 30)	84	0	(Belgium) Dragons	v. Pakistan, 13 June 2026

== See also ==
- Belgium men's national under-21 field hockey team
- Belgium women's national field hockey team
