= 2026–27 Women's FIH Pro League =

- Dates: 8 December 2026 – 27 June 2027
- Teams: 9 (from 4 confederations)

The 2026–27 Women's FIH Pro League will be the eighth edition of the Women's FIH Pro League, a field hockey championship for women's national teams. The tournament will begin on 8 December 2026 and will finish on 27 June 2027.

== Format ==
The home and away principle will be kept for the season, which will be divide into date blocks. To assist with competition planning, international and national, several teams will be gather in one venue to contest “mini-tournaments," wherein they each will be play two matches against one another.

If one of the two matches played between two teams will be cancelled, the winner of the other match will receive double points.

The highest ranked team not yet qualified will earn direct qualification for the 2028 Summer Olympics.

== Teams ==
Following their win in the 2025–26 FIH Nations Cup, the promoted team will be India, replacing the relegated team of the 2025–26 FIH Pro League edition, Ireland. Great Britain will replace England for this edition.

- Argentina
- Australia
- Belgium
- China
- Germany
- Great Britain
- India
- Netherlands
- Spain

== Venues and stages ==
Following is a list of all venues and host cities across the world. Tournament hosts in parentheses.

December	February	June
Argentina (host); China; Great Britain	Argentina (host); Germany; India	Argentina; Australia; Belgium (host); China; Great Britain; India; Spain
Belgium; Germany; Netherlands; Spain (host)	Great Britain; India (host); Spain	Australia; China; Germany (host); Great Britain; India
	Australia (host); Belgium; China; Netherlands	Argentina; Great Britain; India; Netherlands (host); Spain

== Results ==
=== Standings ===
Pos	Team	Pld	W	SOW	SOL	L	GF	GA	GD	Pts	Qualification or relegation
1	Argentina	0	0	0	0	0	0	0	0	0	Qualifies for the 2028 Summer Olympics
2	Australia	0	0	0	0	0	0	0	0	0	
3	Belgium	0	0	0	0	0	0	0	0	0	
4	China	0	0	0	0	0	0	0	0	0	
5	Germany	0	0	0	0	0	0	0	0	0	
6	Great Britain	0	0	0	0	0	0	0	0	0	
7	India (Note: India is already qualified for the 2028 Summer Olympics as the highest placed nation of the 2026 Asian Games.)	0	0	0	0	0	0	0	0	0	
8	Netherlands (Note: Netherlands is already qualified for the 2028 Summer Olympics as the highest placed nation of the 2025–26 FIH Pro League.)	0	0	0	0	0	0	0	0	0	
9	Spain	0	0	0	0	0	0	0	0	0	Relegates to 2027–28 FIH Nations Cup

First match(es) will be played: 8 December 2026. Source:
Rules for classification: 1) points; 2) matches won; 3) goal difference; 4) goals for; 5) head-to-head result; 6) field goals scored.

=== Fixtures ===
All times are local.

8 December 2026
21:30

China	v	Great Britain

Estadio Municipal de Hockey de Córdoba, Córdoba

9 December 2026
21:30

Argentina	v	China

Estadio Municipal de Hockey de Córdoba, Córdoba

10 December 2026
21:30

Argentina	v	Great Britain

Estadio Municipal de Hockey de Córdoba, Córdoba

11 December 2026
21:30

Great Britain	v	China

Estadio Municipal de Hockey de Córdoba, Córdoba

12 December 2026
21:30

Argentina	v	China

Estadio Municipal de Hockey de Córdoba, Córdoba

13 December 2026
21:30

Argentina	v	Great Britain

Estadio Municipal de Hockey de Córdoba, Córdoba

14 December 2026
12:00

Netherlands	v	Belgium

Estadio Betero, Valencia

14 December 2026
17:00

Spain	v	Germany

Estadio Betero, Valencia

16 December 2026
12:00

Belgium	v	Germany

Estadio Betero, Valencia

16 December 2026
17:00

Spain	v	Netherlands

Estadio Betero, Valencia

17 December 2026
13:00

Germany	v	Netherlands

Estadio Betero, Valencia

17 December 2026
18:00

Spain	v	Belgium

Estadio Betero, Valencia

19 December 2026
14:30

Belgium	v	Netherlands

Estadio Betero, Valencia

19 December 2026
17:00

Spain	v	Germany

Estadio Betero, Valencia

20 December 2026
13:00

Germany	v	Belgium

Estadio Betero, Valencia

20 December 2026
18:00

Spain	v	Netherlands

Estadio Betero, Valencia

22 December 2026
09:00

Netherlands	v	Germany

Estadio Betero, Valencia

22 December 2026
14:00

Spain	v	Belgium

Estadio Betero, Valencia

9 February 2027

India	v	Germany

Estadio Mundialista Luciana Aymar, Rosario

10 February 2027

Argentina	v	India

Estadio Mundialista Luciana Aymar, Rosario

11 February 2027

Argentina	v	Germany

Estadio Mundialista Luciana Aymar, Rosario

12 February 2027

Germany	v	India

Estadio Mundialista Luciana Aymar, Rosario

13 February 2027
10:00

Belgium	v	China

Gold Coast Hockey Centre, Gold Coast

13 February 2027

Argentina	v	India

Estadio Mundialista Luciana Aymar, Rosario

13 February 2027
15:00

Australia	v	Netherlands

Gold Coast Hockey Centre, Gold Coast

14 February 2027
11:30

Netherlands	v	China

Gold Coast Hockey Centre, Gold Coast

14 February 2027

Argentina	v	Germany

Estadio Mundialista Luciana Aymar, Rosario

14 February 2027
14:00

Australia	v	Belgium

Gold Coast Hockey Centre, Gold Coast

16 February 2027
19:00

Australia	v	China

Gold Coast Hockey Centre, Gold Coast

17 February 2027
19:00

Australia	v	China

Gold Coast Hockey Centre, Gold Coast

20 February 2027
10:00

China	v	Belgium

Gold Coast Hockey Centre, Gold Coast

20 February 2027
15:00

Australia	v	Netherlands

Gold Coast Hockey Centre, Gold Coast

21 February 2027
11:30

China	v	Netherlands

Gold Coast Hockey Centre, Gold Coast

21 February 2027
14:00

Australia	v	Belgium

Gold Coast Hockey Centre, Gold Coast

23 February 2027
17:00

India	v	Great Britain

Birsa Munda International Hockey Stadium, Rourkela

24 February 2027
17:00

Great Britain	v	Spain

Birsa Munda International Hockey Stadium, Rourkela

25 February 2027
17:00

India	v	Spain

Birsa Munda International Hockey Stadium, Rourkela

26 February 2027
17:00

India	v	Great Britain

Birsa Munda International Hockey Stadium, Rourkela

27 February 2027
17:00

Spain	v	Great Britain

Birsa Munda International Hockey Stadium, Rourkela

28 February 2027
17:00

India	v	Spain

Birsa Munda International Hockey Stadium, Rourkela

12 June 2027
11:00

India	v	China

Ernst Reuter Sportfeld, Berlin

12 June 2027
16:00

Germany	v	Australia

Ernst Reuter Sportfeld, Berlin

12 June 2027
17:30

Belgium	v	Great Britain

Belfius Hockey Arena, Wavre

13 June 2027
10:00

China	v	India

Ernst Reuter Sportfeld, Berlin

13 June 2027
15:00

Germany	v	Australia

Ernst Reuter Sportfeld, Berlin

13 June 2027
17:30

Belgium	v	Great Britain

Belfius Hockey Arena, Wavre

15 June 2027
12:00

Australia	v	India

Ernst Reuter Sportfeld, Berlin

15 June 2027
12:30

Spain	v	Argentina

SV Kampong, Utrecht

15 June 2027
17:30

Great Britain	v	Netherlands

SV Kampong, Utrecht

15 June 2027
18:00

Germany	v	China

Ernst Reuter Sportfeld, Berlin

16 June 2027
12:00

India	v	Australia

Ernst Reuter Sportfeld, Berlin

16 June 2027
12:30

Argentina	v	Spain

SV Kampong, Utrecht

16 June 2027
17:30

Netherlands	v	Great Britain

SV Kampong, Utrecht

16 June 2027
18:00

Germany	v	China

Ernst Reuter Sportfeld, Berlin

19 June 2027
11:00

Australia	v	Great Britain

Belfius Hockey Arena, Wavre

19 June 2027
16:00

Belgium	v	Argentina

Belfius Hockey Arena, Wavre

20 June 2027
11:00

Great Britain	v	Australia

Belfius Hockey Arena, Wavre

20 June 2027
13:30

Belgium	v	Argentina

Belfius Hockey Arena, Wavre

22 June 2027
13:00

Argentina	v	Australia

Belfius Hockey Arena, Wavre

22 June 2027
15:30

China	v	Spain

Belfius Hockey Arena, Wavre

22 June 2027
17:30

Netherlands	v	India

HC 's-Hertogenbosch, 's-Hertogenbosch

23 June 2027
09:30

Australia	v	Argentina

Belfius Hockey Arena, Wavre

23 June 2027
12:00

Spain	v	China

Belfius Hockey Arena, Wavre

23 June 2027
17:30

Netherlands	v	India

HC 's-Hertogenbosch, 's-Hertogenbosch

26 June 2027
11:00

Australia	v	Spain

Belfius Hockey Arena, Wavre

26 June 2027
13:30

Belgium	v	India

Belfius Hockey Arena, Wavre

26 June 2027
14:00

Germany	v	Great Britain

Hamburger Polo Club, Hamburg

26 June 2027
14:00

Netherlands	v	Argentina

HC 's-Hertogenbosch, 's-Hertogenbosch

27 June 2027
11:00

Spain	v	Australia

Belfius Hockey Arena, Wavre

27 June 2027
13:00

Germany	v	Great Britain

Hamburger Polo Club, Hamburg

27 June 2027
13:00

Netherlands	v	Argentina

HC 's-Hertogenbosch, 's-Hertogenbosch

27 June 2027
13:30

Belgium	v	India

Belfius Hockey Arena, Wavre

== See also ==
- 2026–27 Men's FIH Pro League
