= 2026–27 Men's FIH Pro League =

- Dates: 8 December 2026 – 27 June 2027
- Teams: 9 (from 4 confederations)

The 2026–27 Men's FIH Pro League will be the eighth edition of the Men's FIH Pro League, a field hockey championship for men's national teams. The tournament will begin on 8 December 2026 and will finish on 27 June 2027.

== Format ==
The home and away principle will be kept for the season, which will be divide into date blocks. To assist with competition planning, international and national, several teams will be gather in one venue to contest “mini-tournaments," wherein they each will be play two matches against one another.

If one of the two matches played between two teams will be cancelled, the winner of the other match will receive double points.

This season winner will be earn direct qualification for the 2028 Summer Olympics.

== Teams ==
Following their win in the 2025–26 FIH Nations Cup, the promoted team will be France, replacing the relegated team of the 2025–26 FIH Pro League edition, Pakistan. Great Britain will replace England for this edition.

- Argentina
- Australia
- Belgium
- France
- Germany
- Great Britain
- India
- Netherlands
- Spain

== Venues and stages ==
Following is a list of all venues and host cities across the world. Tournament hosts in parentheses.

December	February	June
Argentina (host); France; Great Britain	Argentina; Germany; Great Britain; India (host); Spain	Argentina; Australia; Belgium (host); France; Great Britain; India; Spain
Belgium; Germany; Netherlands; Spain (host)	Australia (host); Belgium; France; Netherlands	Australia; France; Germany (host); Great Britain; India
		Argentina; Great Britain; India; Netherlands (host); Spain

== Results ==
=== Standings ===
Pos	Team	Pld	W	SOW	SOL	L	GF	GA	GD	Pts	Qualification or relegation
1	Argentina	0	0	0	0	0	0	0	0	0	Qualified for the 2028 Summer Olympics
2	Australia	0	0	0	0	0	0	0	0	0	
3	Belgium (Note: Belgium is already qualified for the 2028 Summer Olympics as the highest placed nation of the 2025–26 FIH Pro League.)	0	0	0	0	0	0	0	0	0	
4	France	0	0	0	0	0	0	0	0	0	
5	Germany	0	0	0	0	0	0	0	0	0	
6	Great Britain	0	0	0	0	0	0	0	0	0	
7	India (Note: India is already qualified for the 2028 Summer Olympics as the highest placed nation of the 2026 Asian Games.)	0	0	0	0	0	0	0	0	0	
8	Netherlands	0	0	0	0	0	0	0	0	0	
9	Spain	0	0	0	0	0	0	0	0	0	Relegated to 2027–28 FIH Nations Cup

First match(es) will be played: 8 December 2026. Source:
Rules for classification: 1) points; 2) matches won; 3) goal difference; 4) goals for; 5) head-to-head result; 6) field goals scored.

=== Fixtures ===
All times are local.

8 December 2026
19:00

France	v	Great Britain

Estadio Municipal de Hockey de Córdoba, Córdoba

9 December 2026
19:00

Argentina	v	France

Estadio Municipal de Hockey de Córdoba, Córdoba

10 December 2026
19:00

Argentina	v	Great Britain

Estadio Municipal de Hockey de Córdoba, Córdoba

11 December 2026
19:00

Great Britain	v	France

Estadio Municipal de Hockey de Córdoba, Córdoba

12 December 2026
19:00

Argentina	v	France

Estadio Municipal de Hockey de Córdoba, Córdoba

13 December 2026
19:00

Argentina	v	Great Britain

Estadio Municipal de Hockey de Córdoba, Córdoba

14 December 2026
14:30

Netherlands	v	Belgium

Estadio Betero, Valencia

14 December 2026
19:30

Spain	v	Germany

Estadio Betero, Valencia

16 December 2026
14:30

Belgium	v	Germany

Estadio Betero, Valencia

16 December 2026
19:30

Spain	v	Netherlands

Estadio Betero, Valencia

17 December 2026
15:30

Germany	v	Netherlands

Estadio Betero, Valencia

17 December 2026
20:30

Spain	v	Belgium

Estadio Betero, Valencia

19 December 2026
12:00

Belgium	v	Netherlands

Estadio Betero, Valencia

19 December 2026
19:30

Spain	v	Germany

Estadio Betero, Valencia

20 December 2026
15:30

Germany	v	Belgium

Estadio Betero, Valencia

20 December 2026
20:30

Spain	v	Netherlands

Estadio Betero, Valencia

22 December 2026
11:30

Netherlands	v	Germany

Estadio Betero, Valencia

22 December 2026
16:30

Spain	v	Belgium

Estadio Betero, Valencia

13 February 2027
12:30

Belgium	v	France

Gold Coast Hockey Centre, Gold Coast

13 February 2027
17:30

Australia	v	Netherlands

Gold Coast Hockey Centre, Gold Coast

13 February 2027
19:30

India	v	Germany

Rajgir Sports Complex, Rajgir

14 February 2027
16:30

Australia	v	Belgium

Gold Coast Hockey Centre, Gold Coast

14 February 2027
19:00

Netherlands	v	France

Gold Coast Hockey Centre, Gold Coast

14 February 2027
19:30

Argentina	v	Germany

Rajgir Sports Complex, Rajgir

15 February 2027
19:30

India	v	Argentina

Rajgir Sports Complex, Rajgir

16 February 2027
16:30

Australia	v	France

Gold Coast Hockey Centre, Gold Coast

16 February 2027
19:30

India	v	Germany

Rajgir Sports Complex, Rajgir

17 February 2027
16:30

Australia	v	France

Gold Coast Hockey Centre, Gold Coast

17 February 2027
19:30

Germany	v	Argentina

Rajgir Sports Complex, Rajgir

18 February 2027
19:30

India	v	Argentina

Rajgir Sports Complex, Rajgir

20 February 2027
12:30

France	v	Belgium

Gold Coast Hockey Centre, Gold Coast

20 February 2027
17:30

Australia	v	Netherlands

Gold Coast Hockey Centre, Gold Coast

21 February 2027
16:30

Australia	v	Belgium

Gold Coast Hockey Centre, Gold Coast

21 February 2027
19:00

France	v	Netherlands

Gold Coast Hockey Centre, Gold Coast

23 February 2027
19:30

India	v	Great Britain

Birsa Munda International Hockey Stadium, Rourkela

24 February 2027
19:30

Great Britain	v	Spain

Birsa Munda International Hockey Stadium, Rourkela

25 February 2027
19:30

India	v	Spain

Birsa Munda International Hockey Stadium, Rourkela

26 February 2027
19:30

India	v	Great Britain

Birsa Munda International Hockey Stadium, Rourkela

27 February 2027
19:30

Spain	v	Great Britain

Birsa Munda International Hockey Stadium, Rourkela

28 February 2027
19:30

India	v	Spain

Birsa Munda International Hockey Stadium, Rourkela

12 June 2027
13:30

India	v	France

Ernst Reuter Sportfeld, Berlin

12 June 2027
19:00

Germany	v	Australia

Ernst Reuter Sportfeld, Berlin

12 June 2027
20:00

Belgium	v	Great Britain

Belfius Hockey Arena, Wavre

13 June 2027
12:30

France	v	India

Ernst Reuter Sportfeld, Berlin

13 June 2027
18:00

Germany	v	Australia

Ernst Reuter Sportfeld, Berlin

13 June 2027
20:00

Belgium	v	Great Britain

Belfius Hockey Arena, Wavre

15 June 2027
15:00

Spain	v	Argentina

SV Kampong, Utrecht

15 June 2027
15:30

Australia	v	India

Ernst Reuter Sportfeld, Berlin

15 June 2027
20:00

Great Britain	v	Netherlands

SV Kampong, Utrecht

15 June 2027
20:30

Germany	v	France

Ernst Reuter Sportfeld, Berlin

16 June 2027
15:00

Argentina	v	Spain

SV Kampong, Utrecht

16 June 2027
15:30

India	v	Australia

Ernst Reuter Sportfeld, Berlin

16 June 2027
20:00

Netherlands	v	Great Britain

SV Kampong, Utrecht

16 June 2027
20:30

Germany	v	France

Ernst Reuter Sportfeld, Berlin

19 June 2027
13:30

Belgium	v	Argentina

Belfius Hockey Arena, Wavre

19 June 2027
18:30

Australia	v	Great Britain

Belfius Hockey Arena, Wavre

20 June 2027
16:00

Great Britain	v	Australia

Belfius Hockey Arena, Wavre

20 June 2027
18:30

Belgium	v	Argentina

Belfius Hockey Arena, Wavre

22 June 2027
18:00

Australia	v	Argentina

Belfius Hockey Arena, Wavre

22 June 2027
20:00

Netherlands	v	India

HC 's-Hertogenbosch, Hertogenbosch

22 June 2027
20:30

France	v	Spain

Belfius Hockey Arena, Wavre

23 June 2027
18:30

Australia	v	Argentina

Belfius Hockey Arena, Wavre

23 June 2027
20:00

Netherlands	v	India

HC 's-Hertogenbosch, Hertogenbosch

23 June 2027
21:00

Spain	v	France

Belfius Hockey Arena, Wavre

26 June 2027
16:00

Australia	v	Spain

Belfius Hockey Arena, Wavre

26 June 2027
16:30

Netherlands	v	Argentina

HC 's-Hertogenbosch, Hertogenbosch

26 June 2027
17:00

Germany	v	Great Britain

Hamburger Polo Club, Hamburg

26 June 2027
18:30

Belgium	v	India

Belfius Hockey Arena, Wavre

27 June 2027
15:30

Netherlands	v	Argentina

HC 's-Hertogenbosch, Hertogenbosch

27 June 2027
16:00

Germany	v	Great Britain

Hamburger Polo Club, Hamburg

27 June 2027
16:00

Spain	v	Australia

Belfius Hockey Arena, Wavre

27 June 2027
18:30

Belgium	v	India

Belfius Hockey Arena, Wavre

== See also ==
- 2026–27 Women's FIH Pro League
