= Australia men's national field hockey team =

Australia
- Nickname(s): The Kookaburras
- Association: Hockey Australia
- Confederation: OHF (Oceania)
- Head Coach: Mark Hager
- Assistant coach(es): Robert Hammond; Mark Knowles; Eddie Ockenden; David Staniforth
- Manager: Melissa Grey
- Most caps: Edward Ockenden (451)
- Top scorer: Jamie Dwyer (244)
Home	Away

FIH ranking
- Current: 3 (6 November 2026)
- Highest: 1 (2005, 2010–2011, 2014 – January 2017, December 2017 – July 2018, June 2019 – January 2020)
- Lowest: 6 (2023, August 2024)

First international
- New Zealand 5–4 Australia (Palmerston North, New Zealand; 27 September 1922)

Biggest win
- Australia 36–0 Samoa (Stratford, New Zealand; 24 October 2015)

Biggest defeat
- Australia 1–12 India (Melbourne, Australia; 17 August 1935)

Olympic Games
- Appearances: 17 (first in 1956)
- Best result: (gold) 1st (2004)

World Cup
- Appearances: 15 (first in 1971)
- Best result: (gold) 1st (1986, 2010, 2014)

Oceania Cup
- Appearances: 12 (first in 1999)
- Best result: (gold) 1st (1999, 2001, 2003, 2005, 2007, 2009, 2011, 2013, 2015, 2017, 2019, 2023)
Medal record
Event	1st	2nd	3rd
Olympic Games	1	4	5
World Cup	3	2	5
Oceania Cup	12	0	0
Champions Trophy	15	10	5
Commonwealth Games	7	0	0
Hockey World League	2	0	0
Pro League	2	1	1
Total	42	17	16
Olympic Games
Gold medal – first place	2004 Athens	Team
Silver medal – second place	1968 Mexico City	Team
Silver medal – second place	1976 Montreal	Team
Silver medal – second place	1992 Barcelona	Team
Silver medal – second place	2020 Tokyo	Team
Bronze medal – third place	1964 Tokyo	Team
Bronze medal – third place	1996 Atlanta	Team
Bronze medal – third place	2000 Sydney	Team
Bronze medal – third place	2008 Beijing	Team
Bronze medal – third place	2012 London	Team
World Cup
Gold medal – first place	1986 London	
Gold medal – first place	2010 New Delhi	
Gold medal – first place	2014 The Hague	
Silver medal – second place	2002 Kuala Lumpur	
Silver medal – second place	2006 Mönchengladbach	
Bronze medal – third place	1978 Buenos Aires	
Bronze medal – third place	1982 Bombay	
Bronze medal – third place	1990 Lahore	
Bronze medal – third place	1994 Sydney	
Bronze medal – third place	2018 Bhubaneswar	
Oceania Cup
Gold medal – first place	1999 Brisbane	
Gold medal – first place	2001 Melbourne	
Gold medal – first place	2003 Christchurch–Wellington	
Gold medal – first place	2005 Suva	
Gold medal – first place	2007 Buderim	
Gold medal – first place	2009 Invercargill	
Gold medal – first place	2011 Hobart	
Gold medal – first place	2013 Stratford	
Gold medal – first place	2015 Stratford	
Gold medal – first place	2017 Sydney	
Gold medal – first place	2019 Rockhampton	
Gold medal – first place	2023 Whangarei	
Champions Trophy
Gold medal – first place	1983 Karachi	
Gold medal – first place	1984 Karachi	
Gold medal – first place	1985 Perth	
Gold medal – first place	1989 Berlin	
Gold medal – first place	1990 Melbourne	
Gold medal – first place	1993 Kuala Lumpur	
Gold medal – first place	1999 Brisbane	
Gold medal – first place	2005 Chennai	
Gold medal – first place	2008 Rotterdam	
Gold medal – first place	2009 Melbourne	
Gold medal – first place	2010 Mönchengladbach	
Gold medal – first place	2011 Auckland	
Gold medal – first place	2012 Melbourne	
Gold medal – first place	2016 London	
Gold medal – first place	2018 Breda	
Silver medal – second place	1978 Lahore	
Silver medal – second place	1981 Karachi	
Silver medal – second place	1982 Amstelveen	
Silver medal – second place	1986 Lahore	
Silver medal – second place	1992 Karachi	
Silver medal – second place	1995 Berlin	
Silver medal – second place	1997 Adelaide	
Silver medal – second place	2001 Rotterdam	
Silver medal – second place	2003 Amstelveen	
Silver medal – second place	2007 Kuala Lumpur	
Bronze medal – third place	1980 Karachi	
Bronze medal – third place	1987 Amstelveen	
Bronze medal – third place	1988 Lahore	
Bronze medal – third place	1998 Lahore	
Bronze medal – third place	2014 Bhubaneswar	
Commonwealth Games
Gold medal – first place	1998 Kuala Lumpur	Team
Gold medal – first place	2002 Manchester	Team
Gold medal – first place	2006 Melbourne	Team
Gold medal – first place	2010 New Delhi	Team
Gold medal – first place	2014 Glasgow	Team
Gold medal – first place	2018 Gold Coast	Team
Gold medal – first place	2022 Birmingham	Team
Hockey World League
Gold medal – first place	2014–15 Raipur	Team
Gold medal – first place	2016–17 Bhubaneswar	Team

The Australia men's national field hockey team (nicknamed the Kookaburras) is one of the nation's most successful top-level sporting teams. They are the only Australian team in any sport to receive medals at six straight Summer Olympic Games (1992–2012). The Kookaburras placed in the top four in every Olympics between 1980 and 2012 winning gold in 2004; in 2016, the Kookaburras placed sixth. They won the Hockey World Cup in 1986, 2010 and 2014. They won the Hockey Champions Trophy 15 times, the most by any team. They also won the Pro League and World League twice each.

The Kookaburras' inability to win an Olympic gold medal despite their perennial competitiveness, led many in the Australian hockey community to speak of a "curse" afflicting the team, finally broken in 2004 with the win in Athens. However, they failed to win Gold after that after losses in subsequent Olympics including a loss to Belgium in the Gold Medal Match of 2020 Tokyo Olympics - the Kookaburras instead won the silver medal.

== History ==
Australia's first men's team competed in an international match in 1922.

Australia's first men's team competed at the Olympics in field hockey at the 1956 Summer Olympics.

The first major competition won by the national team was the 1983 World Championships held in Karachi.

Australia did not medal at the 1984 Summer Olympics or the 1988 Summer Olympics. At the 1992 Summer Olympics, Australia earned a silver medal, losing gold to Germany. At the 1996 Summer Olympics, Australia finished third, earning a bronze medal.

The team won their first Olympic gold medal at the 2004 Summer Olympics. Barry Dancer coached the side.

Should Australia win the gold medal at the 2012 London Olympics they will become the first national team in field hockey history to hold all four international titles available to them simultaneously. They would hold titles in the 2012 Olympics, 2010 World Cup, 2011 Champions Trophy and their continental championship (2011 Oceania Cup) at the same time. Along with those four titles Australia also holds the Commonwealth Games title from the 2010 championships.

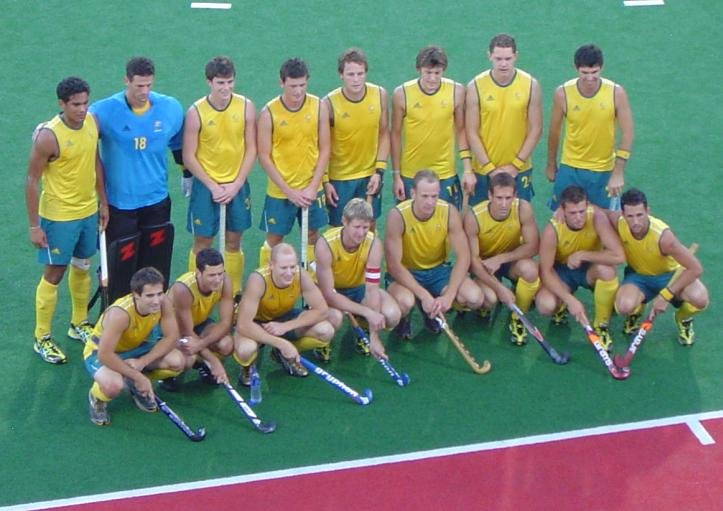
Australia at the 2008 Olympics

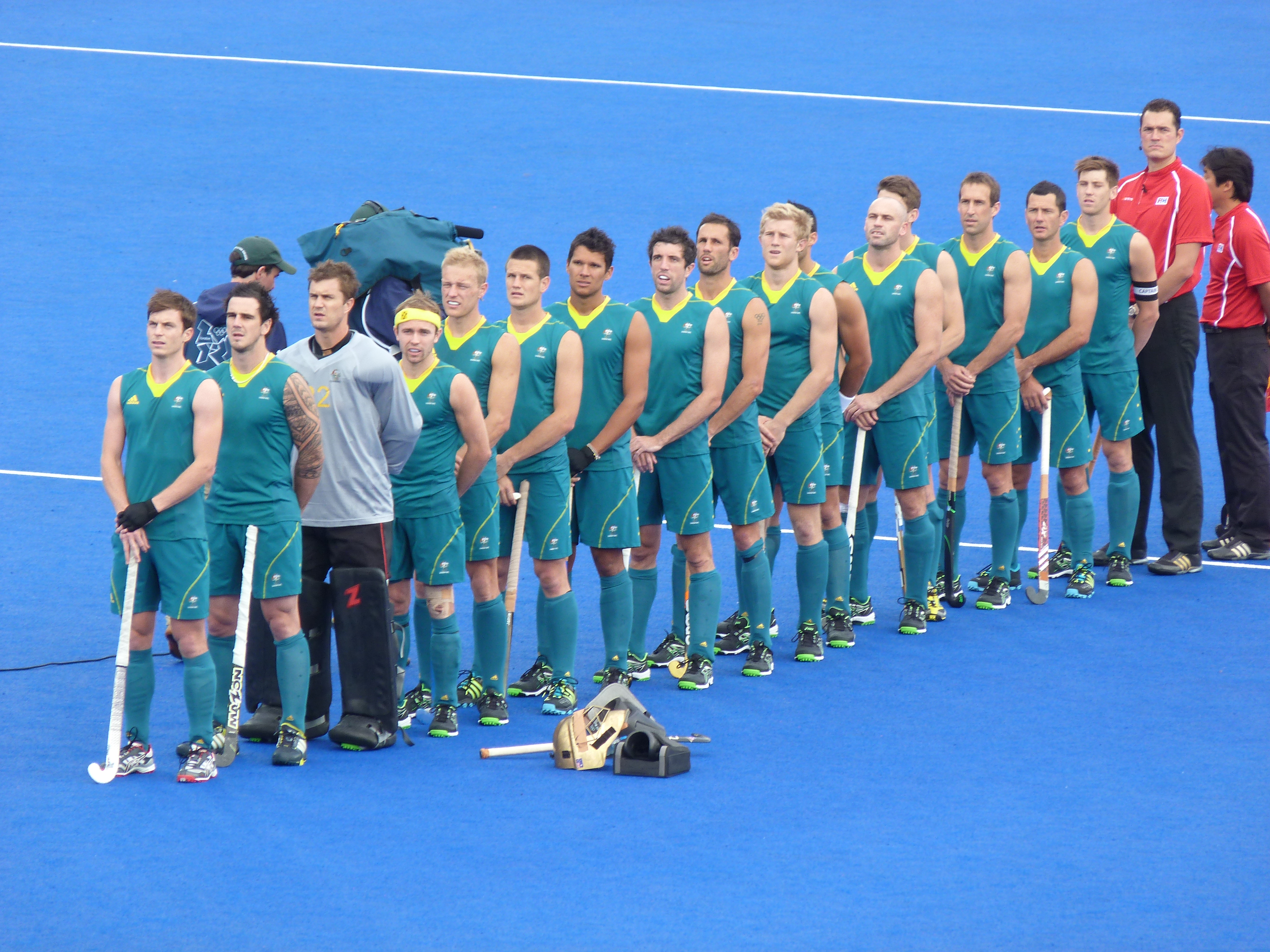
Australia at the 2012 Olympics

== Tournament records ==
Olympic Games
Year	Host city	Position
1908	London, United Kingdom	–
1920	Antwerp, Belgium	–
1928	Amsterdam, Netherlands	–
1932	Los Angeles, United States	–
1936	Berlin, Germany	–
1948	London, United Kingdom	–
1952	Helsinki, Finland	–
1956	Melbourne, Australia	5th
1960	Rome, Italy	6th
1964	Tokyo, Japan	3rd
1968	Mexico City, Mexico	2nd
1972	Munich, Germany	5th
1976	Montreal, Canada	2nd
1980	Moscow, Soviet Union	Boycott
1984	Los Angeles, United States	4th
1988	Seoul, South Korea	4th
1992	Barcelona, Spain	2nd
1996	Atlanta, United States	3rd
2000	Sydney, Australia	3rd
2004	Athens, Greece	1st
2008	Beijing, China	3rd
2012	London, United Kingdom	3rd
2016	Rio de Janeiro, Brazil	6th
2020	Tokyo, Japan	2nd
2024	Paris, France	6th

FIH World Cup
Year	Host city	Position
1971	Barcelona, Spain	8th
1973	Amsterdam, Netherlands	Withdrew
1975	Kuala Lumpur, Malaysia	5th
1978	Buenos Aires, Argentina	3rd
1982	Bombay, India	3rd
1986	London, England	1st
1990	Lahore, Pakistan	3rd
1994	Sydney, Australia	3rd
1998	Utrecht, Netherlands	4th
2002	Kuala Lumpur, Malaysia	2nd
2006	Mönchengladbach, Germany	2nd
2010	New Delhi, India	1st
2014	The Hague, Netherlands	1st
2018	Bhubaneswar, India	3rd
2023	Bhubaneswar and Rourkela, India	4th
2026	Wavre, Belgium; Amsterdam, Netherlands	5th

FIH Champions Trophy
Year	Host city	Position
1978	Lahore, Pakistan	2nd
1980	Karachi, Pakistan	3rd
1981	Karachi, Pakistan	2nd
1982	Amstelveen, Netherlands	2nd
1983	Karachi, Pakistan	1st
1984	Karachi, Pakistan	1st
1985	Perth, Australia	1st
1986	Lahore, Pakistan	2nd
1987	Amstelveen, Netherlands	3rd
1988	Lahore, Pakistan	3rd
1989	Berlin, West Germany	1st
1990	Melbourne, Australia	1st
1991	Berlin, Germany	4th
1992	Karachi, Pakistan	2nd
1993	Kuala Lumpur, Malaysia	1st
1994	Lahore, Pakistan	4th
1995	Berlin, Germany	2nd
1996	Madras, India	6th
1997	Adelaide, Australia	2nd
1998	Lahore, Pakistan	3rd
1999	Brisbane, Australia	1st
2000	Amstelveen, Netherlands	5th
2001	Rotterdam, Netherlands	2nd
2002	Cologne, Germany	5th
2003	Amstelveen, Netherlands	2nd
2004	Lahore, Pakistan	Withdrew
2005	Chennai, India	1st
2006	Terrassa, Spain	4th
2007	Kuala Lumpur, Malaysia	2nd
2008	Rotterdam, Netherlands	1st
2009	Melbourne, Australia	1st
2010	Mönchengladbach, Germany	1st
2011	Auckland, New Zealand	1st
2012	Melbourne, Australia	1st
2014	Bhubaneswar, India	3rd
2016	London, United Kingdom	1st
2018	Breda, Netherlands	1st

FIH World League
Year	Round	Host city	Position
2012–13	Semifinal	Rotterdam, Netherlands	2nd
2012–13	Final	New Delhi, India	4th
2014–15	Semifinal	Antwerp, Belgium	1st
2014–15	Final	Raipur, India	1st
2016–17	Semifinal	Johannesburg, South Africa	3rd
2016–17	Final	Bhubaneswar, India	1st

FIH Pro League
Year	Season	Position
2019	Season One	1st
2020–21	Season Two	2nd
2021–22	Season Three	Withdrew
2022–23	Season Four	7th
2023–24	Season Five	1st
2024–25	Season Six	5th
2025–26	Season Seven	3rd

Commonwealth Games
Year	Host city	Position
1998	Kuala Lumpur, Malaysia	1st
2002	Manchester, England	1st
2006	Melbourne, Australia	1st
2010	New Delhi, India	1st
2014	Glasgow, Scotland	1st
2018	(Australia) Gold Coast, Queensland	1st
2022	Birmingham, England	1st

Oceania Cup
Year	Host city	Position
1999	Brisbane, Australia	1st
2001	Melbourne, Australia	1st
2003	Christchurch and Wellington, New Zealand	1st
2005	Suva, Fiji	1st
2007	Buderim, Australia	1st
2009	Invercargill, New Zealand	1st
2011	Hobart, Australia	1st
2013	Stratford, New Zealand	1st
2015	Stratford, New Zealand	1st
2017	Sydney, Australia	1st
2019	Rockhampton, Australia	1st
2023	Whangārei, New Zealand	1st
2025	Darwin, Australia	1st

Sultan Azlan Shah Cup
Year	Host city	Position
1983	Kuala Lumpur, Malaysia	1st
1985–1991 Did Not Compete
1994	Penang, Malaysia	3rd
1995	Kuala Lumpur, Malaysia	–
1996	Ipoh, Malaysia	2nd
1998	Ipoh, Malaysia	1st
1999	Kuala Lumpur, Malaysia	–
2000	Kuala Lumpur, Malaysia	–
2001	Kuala Lumpur, Malaysia	3rd
2003	Kuala Lumpur, Malaysia	–
2004	Kuala Lumpur, Malaysia	1st
2005	Kuala Lumpur, Malaysia	1st
2006	Kuala Lumpur, Malaysia	2nd
2007	Ipoh, Malaysia	1st
2008	Ipoh, Malaysia	–
2009	Ipoh, Malaysia	–
2010	Ipoh, Malaysia	3rd
2011	Ipoh, Malaysia	1st
2012	Ipoh, Malaysia	–
2013	Ipoh, Malaysia	1st
2014	Ipoh, Malaysia	1st
2015	Ipoh, Malaysia	2nd
2016	Ipoh, Malaysia	1st
2017	Ipoh, Malaysia	2nd
2018	Ipoh, Malaysia	1st
2019–2025 Did Not Compete
2026	Q	

== Team ==
=== Current squad ===
Roster for the 2026 Men's FIH Hockey World Cup.

Head coach: Mark Hager

1. Lachlan Sharp
2. Tom Craig
7. Nathan Ephraums
8. Connar Otterbach
9. Liam Henderson
10. Joshua Beltz
12. Jed Snowden (GK)
13. Blake Govers
15. Jayden Atkinson
16. Tim Howard
19. Craig Marais
20. Ky Willott
21. Jack Welch
23. Hayden Beltz
24. Cambell Geddes
26. James Collins
27. Joel Rintala
28. Ash Thomas (GK)
29. Tim Brand
32. Jeremy Hayward

=== Notable players ===
- Ric Charlesworth
- Jamie Dwyer

== Results and fixtures ==
The following is a list of match results in the last 12 months, as well as any future matches that have been scheduled.

Win Draw Loss Fixture

=== 2026 ===
10 February 2026 Australia Leg	Australia	3–2	Pakistan	Hobart, Australia
17:30	Brand 2', 19'; Govers 58'	Report	Nadeem 49'; Khan 53'	Stadium: Tasmanian Hockey Centre

12 February 2026 Australia Leg	Australia	3–0	Germany	Hobart, Australia
17:30	Rintala 10'; Geddes 18'; Marais 37'	Report		Stadium: Tasmanian Hockey Centre

13 February 2026 Australia Leg	Australia	3–0	Pakistan	Hobart, Australia
17:30	Govers 14', 34'; Welch 42'	Report		Stadium: Tasmanian Hockey Centre

15 February 2026 Australia Leg	Australia	3–2	Germany	Hobart, Australia
15:30	Welch 8'; Govers 18'; Brand 47'	Report	Brilla 10', 16'	Stadium: Tasmanian Hockey Centre

20 February 2026 Australia Leg	Australia	3–1	Spain	Hobart, Australia
19:30	Welch 3', 58'; Rintala 16'	Report	Álvarez 53'	Stadium: Tasmanian Hockey Centre

22 February 2026 Australia Leg	Australia	2–2 (5–4 p)	India	Hobart, Australia
17:30	Rintala 47', 56'	Report	Rohidas 15'; Jugraj 43'	Stadium: Tasmanian Hockey Centre
	Penalties
	Brand (penalty shoot-out scored); Henderson (penalty shoot-out scored); Howard (penalty shoot-out scored); Welch (penalty shoot-out scored); Craig (penalty shoot-out scored)		(penalty shoot-out scored) Lakra; (penalty shoot-out scored) Maninder; (penalty shoot-out scored) Pal; (penalty shoot-out scored) Jugraj; (penalty shoot-out missed) Aditya

23 February 2026 Australia Leg	Australia	3–0	Spain	Hobart, Australia
19:30	Rintala 1'; Hayward 36'; Craig 44'	Report		Stadium: Tasmanian Hockey Centre

25 February 2026 Australia Leg	Australia	1–1 (1–3 p)	India	Hobart, Australia
19:30	Hayward 49'	Report	Lakra 51'	Stadium: Tasmanian Hockey Centre
	Penalties
	Brand (penalty shoot-out missed); Henderson (penalty shoot-out missed); Burns (penalty shoot-out missed); Hayward (penalty shoot-out scored)		(penalty shoot-out scored) Lakra; (penalty shoot-out scored) Maninder; (penalty shoot-out missed) Abhishek; (penalty shoot-out scored) Vishnukant

14 June 2026 England Leg	England	4–3	Australia	London, England
12:30	Calnan 40'; Goodfield 42'; Sorsby 48'; Hooper 55'	Report	Ephraums 13', 57'; Willott 58'	Stadium: Lee Valley Hockey and Tennis Centre

17 June 2026 England Leg	Australia	1–2	Argentina	London, England
17:00	Willott 29'	Report	Domene 40', 57'	Stadium: Lee Valley Hockey and Tennis Centre

18 June 2026 England Leg	Argentina	2–3	Australia	London, England
17:00	T. Domene 2'; L. Domene 6'	Report	Ephraums 26', 59'; Craig 50'	Stadium: Lee Valley Hockey and Tennis Centre

21 June 2026 England Leg	England	3–1	Australia	London, England
11:30	Bandurak 40', 47'; Gall 56'	Report	Geddes 41'	Stadium: Lee Valley Hockey and Tennis Centre

23 June 2026 Belgium Leg	Australia	2–0	Netherlands	Wavre, Belgium
18:00	Brand 14'; Hayward 31'	Report		Stadium: Stade Justin Peeters

25 June 2026 Belgium Leg	Belgium	1–2	Australia	Wavre, Belgium
21:00	Boon 32'	Report	Welch 36'; Ephraums 50'	Stadium: Stade Justin Peeters

26 June 2026 Belgium Leg	Netherlands	6–3	Australia	Wavre, Belgium
21:00	Janssen 12', 60'; Telgenkamp 17', 23' de Vilder 25'; Reyenga 45'	Report	Willott 20'; Ephraums 52'; Howard 59'	Stadium: Stade Justin Peeters

28 June 2026 Belgium Leg	Belgium	5–4	Australia	Wavre, Belgium
17:00	Crols 30'; Boon 39', 50', 54'; Hendrickx 42'	Report	Beltz 8'; Burns 11'; Brand 14'; Welch 29'	Stadium: Stade Justin Peeters

16 August 2026 World Cup Pool C	Australia	3–1	Ireland	Wavre, Belgium
11:30	Rintala 7', 23'; Govers 27'	Report	Empey 54'	Stadium: Belfius Hockey Arena

18 August 2026 World Cup Pool C	Spain	0–1	Australia	Wavre, Belgium
14:00		Report	Govers 47'	Stadium: Belfius Hockey Arena

20 August 2026 World Cup Pool C	Australia	2–2	South Africa	Wavre, Belgium
11:30	Rintala 38'; Willott 43'	Report	Cassiem 4', 44'	Stadium: Belfius Hockey Arena

21 August 2026 World Cup Pool F	Australia	1–1	Belgium	Wavre, Belgium
20:30	Craig 23'	Report	Boon 37'	Stadium: Belfius Hockey Arena

23 August 2026 World Cup Pool F	Germany	4–2	Australia	Wavre, Belgium
17:30	Müller 11'; Struthoff 12'; Warweg 19'; Von Montgelas 40'	Report	Govers 3'; Rintala 30'	Stadium: Belfius Hockey Arena

28 August 2026 World Cup 5th place match	England	0–2	Australia	Amstelveen, Netherlands
15:00		Report	Govers 30'; Willott 48'	Stadium: Wagener Stadium

20 November 2026 Sultan Azlan Shah Cup RR	Australia	5–1	United States	Ipoh, Malaysia
15:00	Geddes 3'; Ephraums 11', 15', 49'; Welch 39'	Report	Grewal 43'	Stadium: Azlan Shah Stadium

21 November 2026 Sultan Azlan Shah Cup RR	Australia	7–1	South Korea	Ipoh, Malaysia
17:15	Jackson 8', 39'; Ephraums 17'; Geddes 20'; Grobbelaar 27'; Burns 50'; Hawthorne 53'	Report	Kong 4'	Stadium: Azlan Shah Stadium

23 November 2026 Sultan Azlan Shah Cup RR	Pakistan	v	Australia	Ipoh, Malaysia
17:15				Stadium: Azlan Shah Stadium

24 November 2026 Sultan Azlan Shah Cup RR	Malaysia	v	Australia	Ipoh, Malaysia
19:30				Stadium: Azlan Shah Stadium

26 November 2026 Sultan Azlan Shah Cup RR	Australia	v	Canada	Ipoh, Malaysia
15:00				Stadium: Azlan Shah Stadium

=== 2027 ===
13 February 2027 Australia Leg	Australia	v	Netherlands	Gold Coast, Australia
17:30				Stadium: Gold Coast Hockey Centre

14 February 2027 Australia Leg	Australia	v	Belgium	Gold Coast, Australia
16:30				Stadium: Gold Coast Hockey Centre

16 February 2027 Australia Leg	Australia	v	France	Gold Coast, Australia
16:30				Stadium: Gold Coast Hockey Centre

17 February 2027 Australia Leg	Australia	v	France	Gold Coast, Australia
16:30				Stadium: Gold Coast Hockey Centre

20 February 2027 Australia Leg	Australia	v	Netherlands	Gold Coast, Australia
17:30				Stadium: Gold Coast Hockey Centre

21 February 2027 Australia Leg	Australia	v	Belgium	Gold Coast, Australia
16:30				Stadium: Gold Coast Hockey Centre

12 June 2027 Germany Leg	Germany	v	Australia	Berlin, Germany
19:00				Stadium: Ernst-Reuter Sportfeld

13 June 2027 Germany Leg	Germany	v	Australia	Berlin, Germany
18:00				Stadium: Ernst-Reuter Sportfeld

15 June 2027 Germany Leg	Australia	v	India	Berlin, Germany
15:30				Stadium: Ernst-Reuter Sportfeld

16 June 2027 Germany Leg	India	v	Australia	Berlin, Germany
15:30				Stadium: Ernst-Reuter Sportfeld

19 June 2027 Belgium Leg	Australia	v	Great Britain	Wavre, Belgium
18:30				Stadium: Belfius Hockey Arena

20 June 2027 Belgium Leg	Great Britain	v	Australia	Wavre, Belgium
16:00				Stadium: Belfius Hockey Arena

22 June 2027 Belgium Leg	Australia	v	Argentina	Wavre, Belgium
18:00				Stadium: Belfius Hockey Arena

23 June 2027 Belgium Leg	Argentina	v	Australia	Wavre, Belgium
18:30				Stadium: Belfius Hockey Arena

26 June 2027 Belgium Leg	Australia	v	Spain	Wavre, Belgium
16:00				Stadium: Belfius Hockey Arena

27 June 2027 Belgium Leg	Spain	v	Australia	Wavre, Belgium
16:00				Stadium: Belfius Hockey Arena

== Family ==
Barry Dancer/Brent Dancer and Ric Charlesworth/Jonathan Charlesworth are two pairs of father as coach and son as player while both were affiliated with the national team in those positions.

== Recognition ==
- 1981: Australian Sport Awards Team of the Year
- 1987: Australian Sport Awards Team of the Year
- 2004: Australian Sport Awards International Team of the Year
- 2014: AIS Sport Performance Awards Team of the Year.
