= Belgium women's national field hockey team =

Belgium
- Nickname(s): Red Panthers
- Association: Royal Belgian Hockey Association
- Confederation: EHF (Europe)
- Head Coach: Adam Commens
- Assistant coach(es): Jeroen Baart; John Goldberg
- Manager: Muriel Peche
- Captain: Charlotte Englebert; Michelle Struijk
Home	Away

FIH ranking
- Current: 3 (3 October 2026)

Olympic Games
- Appearances: 2 (first in 2012)
- Best result: 4th (2024)

World Cup
- Appearances: 8 (first in 1974)
- Best result: (bronze) 3rd (1978, 2026)

EuroHockey Championship
- Appearances: 13 (first in 1984)
- Best result: (silver) 2nd (2017, 2023)
Medal record
World Cup
Bronze medal – third place	1978 Madrid
Bronze medal – third place	2026 Wavre–Amstelveen
EuroHockey Championship
Silver medal – second place	2017 Amstelveen
Silver medal – second place	2023 Mönchengladbach
Bronze medal – third place	2021 Amstelveen

The Belgium women's national field hockey team represents Belgium in international women's field hockey and is controlled by the Royal Belgian Hockey Association, the governing body for field hockey in Belgium. The team is coached by Rein van Eijk since 2025.

== Competitive record ==
Champions Runners-up Third place Fourth place

=== Summer Olympics ===
Summer Olympics record
Year	Round	Position	Pld	W	D	L	GF	GA
(Soviet Union) 1980 until (China) 2008	Did not qualify							
(United Kingdom) 2012	Group stage	11th	6	1	2	3	4	11
(Brazil) 2016	Did not qualify							
(Japan) 2020	Did not qualify							
(France) 2024	Semifinals	4th	8	5	2	1	18	7
Total	2/11	0 titles	14	6	4	4	22	18

=== Hockey World Cup ===
FIH World Cup record
Year	Round	Position	Pld	W	D*	L	GF	GA
(France) 1974	Group stage	5th	6	4	1	1	13	2
(West Germany) 1976	Semifinal	4th	6	3	0	3	14	8
(Spain) 1978	Semifinal	3rd	7	3	1	3	6	10
(Argentina) 1981	Group stage	8th	7	2	1	4	7	16
(Malaysia) 1983 until (Argentina) 2010	Did not qualify							
(Netherlands) 2014	Group stage	12th	6	0	2	4	10	18
(England) 2018	Second round	10th	4	1	2	1	8	7
(Netherlands) (Spain) 2022	Quarterfinal	6th	5	3	0	2	13	5
(Belgium) (Netherlands) 2026	Semifinal	3rd	7	4	2	1	12	6
Total	8/16	0 titles	48	20	9	19	83	72

=== World League ===
FIH Hockey World League record
Season	Position	Round	Pld	W	D*	L	GF	GA
2012–13	11th	Round 2	4	3	0	1	18	3
2012–13	11th	Semifinals	5	0	1	4	5	13
2014–15	13th	Semifinals	7	3	2	2	9	8
2016–17	15th	Semifinals	6	2	1	3	12	8
Total	0 titles	Semifinal	22	8	4	10	44	32

=== FIH Pro League ===
FIH Pro League record
Season	Position	Pld	W	D	L	GF	GA	Squad
(Netherlands) 2019	5th	16	6	2	8	21	27	Squad
2020–21	7th	12	3	3	6	19	25	Squad
2021–22	4th	16	9	1	6	35	20	Squad
2022–23	4th	16	8	4	4	35	20	Squad
2023–24	4th	16	7	3	6	24	27	Squad
2024–25	3rd	16	9	4	3	42	23	Squad
2025–26	3rd	16	9	2	5	31	23	Squad
Total	Best: 3rd	108	51	19	38	207	165	—N/a

=== EuroHockey Nations Championship ===
EuroHockey Nations Championship record
Year	Round	Position	Pld	W	D	L	GF	GA
(France) 1984	Group stage	8th	7	1	1	5	3	16
(England) 1987	Group stage	9th	7	3	0	4	6	28
(Belgium) 1991	Group stage	7th	7	1	3	3	6	13
(Netherlands) 1995	Group stage	11th	7	1	1	5	10	32
(Germany) 1999	Group stage	11th	7	1	1	5	5	32
(Spain) 2003	did not participate							
(Republic of Ireland) 2005	did not participate							
(England) 2007	did not participate							
(Netherlands) 2009	did not participate							
(Germany) 2011	Group stage	5th	5	3	0	2	10	9
(Belgium) 2013	Semi-finals	4th	5	2	0	3	11	8
(England) 2015	Group stage	5th	5	3	1	1	9	9
(Netherlands) 2017	Finals	2nd	5	3	0	2	9	5
(Belgium) 2019	Group stage	6th	5	2	1	2	9	6
(Netherlands) 2021	Semi finals	3rd	5	2	2	1	10	6
(Germany) 2023	Finals	2nd	5	3	0	2	13	5
(Germany) 2025	Semi-finals	4th	5	2	3	0	10	3
(England) 2027	Qualified							
Total	14/19	0 titles	75	27	13	35	107	172

*Draws include knockout matches decided on a penalty shoot-out.

== Results and fixtures ==
The following is a list of match results in the last 12 months, as well as any future matches that have been scheduled.

Win Draw Loss Fixture

=== 2025–26 ===
9 December 2025 Ireland Leg	England	0–3	Belgium	Dublin, Ireland
14:00		Report	Vanden Borre 7', 38'; Englebert 58'	Stadium: Sport Ireland Campus

10 December 2025 Ireland Leg	Ireland	1–2	Belgium	Dublin, Ireland
14:00	Curran 60+'	Report	Ballenghien 23', 34'	Stadium: Sport Ireland Campus

12 December 2025 Ireland Leg	Belgium	2–1	England	Dublin, Ireland
14:00	Englebert 42'; Vanden Borre 59'	Report	Bourne 14'	Stadium: Sport Ireland Campus

13 December 2025 Ireland Leg	Ireland	1–2	Belgium	Dublin, Ireland
14:00	Torrans 41'	Report	Englebert 4'; Gerniers 10'	Stadium: Sport Ireland Campus

5 February 2026 Spain Leg	Spain	3–5	Belgium	Valencia, Spain
13:30	Amundson 25'; Agulló 56'; Álvarez 59'	Report	Van Remortel 16', 35'; Dewaet 17'; Belis 38'; D. Marien 55'	Stadium: Estadio Beteró

6 February 2026 Spain Leg	Germany	1–3	Belgium	Valencia, Spain
13:30	Haid 20'	Report	Marien 4'; Dewate 34', 49'	Stadium: Estadio Beteró

8 February 2026 Spain Leg	Spain	1–0	Belgium	Valencia, Spain
13:30	Rogoski 27'	Report		Stadium: Estadio Beteró

9 February 2026 Spain Leg	Belgium	1–0	Germany	Valencia, Spain
13:30	D. Marien 51'	Report		Stadium: Estadio Beteró

14 June 2026 Belgium Leg	Belgium	2–2 (1–2 p)	Argentina	Wavre, Belgium
13:00	Marien 34'; Vanden Borre 47'	Report	Bruggesser 5'; Díaz 33'	Stadium: Stade Justin Peeters
	Penalties
	Van Heel (penalty shoot-out scored); Puvrez (penalty shoot-out missed); Englebert (penalty shoot-out missed); Rasir (penalty shoot-out missed); Struijk (penalty shoot-out missed)		(penalty shoot-out scored) Granatto; (penalty shoot-out missed) Bruggesser; (penalty shoot-out missed) Cairo; (penalty shoot-out scored) Jankunas

16 June 2026 Belgium Leg	Belgium	5–0	China	Wavre, Belgium
18:30	Bonami 7', 39'; D. Marien 36'; Englebert 46'; Van Heel 55'	Report		Stadium: Stade Justin Peeters

18 June 2026 Belgium Leg	Belgium	0–1	China	Wavre, Belgium
18:30		Report	Zhang Y. 10'	Stadium: Stade Justin Peeters

20 June 2026 Belgium Leg	Belgium	2–3	Argentina	Wavre, Belgium
13:00	Van Heel 51'; Englebert 57'	Report	Jankunas 3'; Gorzelany 45', 60'	Stadium: Stade Justin Peeters

23 June 2026 Belgium Leg	Belgium	1–1 (4–2 p)	Australia	Wavre, Belgium
20:30	S. Vanden Borre 1'	Report	Arnott 19'	Stadium: Stade Justin Peeters
	Penalties
	Verhees (penalty shoot-out scored); De Clerck (penalty shoot-out scored); D. Marien (penalty shoot-out scored); S. Vanden Borre (penalty shoot-out scored)		(penalty shoot-out scored) Arnott; (penalty shoot-out missed) Downes; (penalty shoot-out scored) Nobbs; (penalty shoot-out missed) Lawton

25 June 2026 Belgium Leg	Belgium	1–4	Netherlands	Wavre, Belgium
18:30	S. Vanden Borre 58'	Report	Y. Jansen 20'; P. Dicke 39', 46'; F. Moes 51'	Stadium: Stade Justin Peeters

26 June 2026 Belgium Leg	Belgium	2–1	Australia	Wavre, Belgium
18:30	Englebert 10'; Belis 59'	Report	Stewart 22'	Stadium: Stade Justin Peeters

28 June 2026 Belgium Leg	Belgium	0–3	Netherlands	Wavre, Belgium
14:30		Report	Burg 34'; Jansen 54', 57'	Stadium: Stade Justin Peeters

16 August 2026 World Cup Pool B	Belgium	5–2	New Zealand	Wavre, Belgium
17:30	Vanden Borre 9'; Puvrez 12'; Englebert 22'; Rasir 41', 47'	Report	Doar 4'; Cotter 33'	Stadium: Belfius Hockey Arena

18 August 2026 World Cup Pool B	Spain	1–1	Belgium	Wavre, Belgium
20:30	L. Jiménez 42'	Report	Vanden Borre 24'	Stadium: Belfius Hockey Arena

20 August 2026 World Cup Pool B	Belgium	2–1	Ireland	Wavre, Belgium
20:30	Englebert 49'; Ballenghien 60'	Report	Beggs 13'	Stadium: Belfius Hockey Arena

22 August 2026 World Cup Pool F	Germany	1–3	Belgium	Wavre, Belgium
17:30	Nolte 32'	Report	Marien 23'; Vanden Borre 34'; Englebert 42'	Stadium: Belfius Hockey Arena

24 August 2026 World Cup Pool F	Belgium	0–0	Argentina	Wavre, Belgium
20:30		Report		Stadium: Belfius Hockey Arena

27 August 2026 World Cup Semi final	Netherlands	1–0	Belgium	Amstelveen, Netherlands
18:00	Matla 28'	Report		Stadium: Wagener Stadium

29 August 2026 World Cup Third place match	Belgium	1–0	Australia	Amstelveen, Netherlands
13:00	Englebert 20'	Report		Stadium: Wagener Stadium

=== 2026–27 ===
14 December 2026 Spain Leg	Netherlands	v	Belgium	Valencia, Spain
12:00				Stadium: Estadio Betero

16 December 2026 Spain Leg	Belgium	v	Germany	Valencia, Spain
12:00				Stadium: Estadio Betero

17 December 2026 Spain Leg	Spain	v	Belgium	Valencia, Spain
18:00				Stadium: Estadio Betero

19 December 2026 Spain Leg	Belgium	v	Netherlands	Valencia, Spain
14:30				Stadium: Estadio Betero

20 December 2026 Spain Leg	Germany	v	Belgium	Valencia, Spain
13:00				Stadium: Estadio Betero

22 December 2026 Spain Leg	Spain	v	Belgium	Valencia, Spain
14:00				Stadium: Estadio Betero

13 February 2027 Australia Leg	Belgium	v	China	Gold Coast, Australia
10:00				Stadium: Gold Coast Hockey Centre

14 February 2027 Australia Leg	Australia	v	Belgium	Gold Coast, Australia
14:00				Stadium: Gold Coast Hockey Centre

20 February 2027 Australia Leg	China	v	Belgium	Gold Coast, Australia
10:00				Stadium: Gold Coast Hockey Centre

21 February 2027 Australia Leg	Australia	v	Belgium	Gold Coast, Australia
14:00				Stadium: Gold Coast Hockey Centre

12 June 2027 Belgium Leg	Belgium	v	Great Britain	Wavre, Belgium
17:30				Stadium: Belfius Hockey Arena

13 June 2027 Belgium Leg	Belgium	v	Great Britain	Wavre, Belgium
17:30				Stadium: Belfius Hockey Arena

19 June 2027 Belgium Leg	Belgium	v	Argentina	Wavre, Belgium
16:00				Stadium: Belfius Hockey Arena

20 June 2027 Belgium Leg	Belgium	v	Argentina	Wavre, Belgium
13:30				Stadium: Belfius Hockey Arena

26 June 2027 Belgium Leg	Belgium	v	India	Wavre, Belgium
13:30				Stadium: Belfius Hockey Arena

27 June 2027 Belgium Leg	Belgium	v	India	Wavre, Belgium
13:30				Stadium: Belfius Hockey Arena

28 July 2026 2027 EC Pool B	Belgium	v	Ireland	London, England
16:45				Stadium: Lee Valley Hockey and Tennis Centre

30 July 2026 2027 EC Pool B	Spain	v	Belgium	London, England
17:15				Stadium: Lee Valley Hockey and Tennis Centre

2 August 2027 2027 EC Quarter-finals	Belgium	v	TBD	London, England
				Stadium: Lee Valley Hockey and Tennis Centre

5 August 2026 2027 EC TBD	Belgium	v	TBD	London, England
				Stadium: Twickenham Stoop

7 August 2026 2027 EC TBD	Belgium	v	TBD	London, England
				Stadium: Twickenham Stoop

== Team ==
=== Current squad ===
The following 26 players will be called up for the Training squad.

Caps and goals updated as of 29 August, after the match against Australia.

Head coach: Adam Commens

No.	Pos.	Player	Date of birth (age)	Caps	Goals	Club
29	GK	Elodie Picard	8 September 1997 (age 29)	82	0	(Belgium) Leuven
33	GK	Maïté Bussels	8 December 2004 (age 21)	17	0	(Belgium) Dragons
37	GK	Maud Dewelde	10 September 2002 (age 24)	0	0	(Belgium) Antwerp
8	DF	Emma Puvrez	25 July 1997 (age 29)	250	27	(Belgium) Antwerp
15	DF	Vanessa Blockmans	4 April 2002 (age 24)	59	7	(Belgium) Waterloo Ducks
16	DF	Agathe Favart	28 January 2008 (age 18)	5	0	(Belgium) Waterloo Ducks
18	DF	Felicia Theunissen	26 March 2004 (age 22)	7	0	(Belgium) Antwerp
19	DF	Hélène Brasseur	4 January 2002 (age 24)	110	3	(Belgium) Gantoise
22	DF	Stéphanie Vanden Borre	14 September 1997 (age 29)	16	4	(Belgium) Gantoise
25	DF	Anne-Sophie Vanden Borre	17 June 2001 (age 25)	7	0	(Belgium) Gantoise
28	DF	Lisa Moors	5 July 2006 (age 20)	39	2	(Belgium) Leuven
7	MF	Judith Vandermeiren	10 August 1994 (age 32)	285	12	(Belgium) Dragons
11	MF	Perrine de Clerck	1 July 2006 (age 20)	20	0	(Belgium) Leuven
24	MF	Fee van den Abeele	7 August 2007 (age 19)	3	0	(Belgium) Gantoise
32	MF	Louise Dewaet	14 June 2005 (age 21)	45	5	(Netherlands) SCHC
40	MF	Camille Belis	23 October 2004 (age 22)	79	2	(Netherlands) SCHC
48	MF	Alison Smisdom	27 October 2003 (age 23)	0	0	(Belgium) Victory
3	FW	Justine Rasir	4 December 2001 (age 24)	110	13	(Belgium) Racing
4	FW	Delphine Marien	27 March 2002 (age 24)	85	17	(Belgium) Dragons
6	FW	Charlotte Englebert	20 May 2001 (age 25)	119	38	(Netherlands) Den Bosch
9	FW	Emily White	20 September 2004 (age 22)	31	8	(Belgium) Antwerp
12	FW	Emilie Verhees	2 May 2008 (age 18)	17	0	(Belgium) Gantoise
14	FW	Alix Marien	18 May 2003 (age 23)	29	1	(Belgium) Dragons
30	FW	Ambre Ballenghien	13 December 2000 (age 25)	121	55	(Belgium) Gantoise
41	FW	Astrid Bonami	19 May 2003 (age 23)	48	11	(Belgium) Wellington
37	FW	Famke van Heel	11 March 2008 (age 18)	16	2	(Belgium) Waterloo Ducks

=== Recent call-ups ===
The following players have been called up for the national team in the last 12 months.

Pos.	Player	Date of birth (age)	Caps	Goals	Club	Latest call-up
GK	Elena Sotgiu	18 July 1995 (age 31)	120	0	(Belgium) Braxgata	v. Australia, 29 August 2026
DF	Lien Hillewaert	27 November 1997 (age 28)	183	3	(Belgium) Braxgata	v. Australia, 29 August 2026
DF	Lucie Breyne	5 October 2000 (age 26)	85	2	(Belgium) Waterloo Ducks	v. Ireland, 13 December 2026
DF	Fleur Verboven	7 January 2003 (age 23)	2	0	(Belgium) Dragons	v. England, 12 December 2026
MF	Alix Gerniers	29 June 1993 (age 33)	318	58	(Belgium) Gantoise	v. Australia, 29 August 2026
MF	Michelle Struijk	24 June 1998 (age 28)	171	14	(Belgium) Antwerp	v. Australia, 29 August 2026
FW	Alexi van Remortel	16 August 2007 (age 19)	2	2	(Belgium) Gantoise	v. Germany, 6 February 2026
FW	Noa Schreurs	25 July 2003 (age 23)	16	3	(Belgium) Dragons	v. Ireland, 13 December 2026

== See also ==
- Belgium men's national field hockey team
- Belgium women's national under-21 field hockey team
