= 2026–27 Women's Belgian Hockey League =

Field hockey league season

Belgian Hockey League
- Season: 2026–27
- Dates: 20 September 2026 – 23 May 2027

The 2026–27 Women's Belgian Hockey League is the 101th season of the Women's Belgian Hockey League, the top women's Belgian field hockey league.

The season started on 20 September 2026 and will conclude on 23 May 2027 with the second match of the championship final. Gantoise is the defending champions.

== Teams ==
2026–27 Women's Belgian Hockey League teams
Location of Brussels teams in the 2026–27 Women's Belgian Hockey League

Beerschot and Uccle Sport are the two promoted clubs from the 2025–26 National 1, replacing Herakles and Orée.

Team	Location	Province
Antwerp	Brecht	Antwerp
Beerschot	Kontich	Antwerp
Braxgata	Boom	Antwerp
Dragons	Brasschaat	Antwerp
Gantoise	Ghent	East Flanders
Léopold	Uccle	Brussels
Leuven	Heverlee	Flemish Brabant
Racing	Uccle	Brussels
Uccle Sport	Uccle	Brussels
Victory	Edegem	Antwerp
Waterloo Ducks	Waterloo	Walloon Brabant
Wellington	Uccle	Brussels

=== Number of teams by provinces ===
Province	Number of teams	Team(s)
Antwerp	5	Antwerp, Beerschot, Braxgata, Dragons, Victory
Brussels	4	Léopold, Orée, Racing, Wellington
East Flanders	1	Gantoise
Flemish Brabant	1	Leuven
Walloon Brabant	1	Waterloo Ducks
Total	12	

== Regular season ==
=== Standings ===
Pos	Team	Pld	W	D	L	GF	GA	GD	Pts	Qualification or relegation
1	Gantoise	10	8	1	1	25	12	+13	25	Qualification for the play-offs
2	Dragons	10	7	3	0	29	12	+17	24	Qualification for the play-offs
3	Leuven	10	7	2	1	20	9	+11	23	Qualification for the play-offs
4	Waterloo Ducks	10	4	3	3	19	17	+2	15	Qualification for the play-offs
5	Antwerp	10	4	2	4	15	15	0	14	
6	Racing	10	3	5	2	13	10	+3	14	
7	Wellington	10	2	5	3	18	21	−3	11	
8	Braxgata	10	2	4	4	11	15	−4	10	
9	Beerschot	10	2	2	6	9	20	−11	8	
10	Uccle Sport	10	1	4	5	11	18	−7	7	Qualification for the relegation play-offs
11	Victory	10	1	3	6	15	25	−10	6	Relegation to the National 1
12	Léopold	10	1	2	7	12	23	−11	5	Relegation to the National 1

Updated to match(es) played on 15 November 2026. Source: Carlsberg 0.0 Hockey League Ranking
Rules for classification: 1) points; 2) matches won; 3) goal difference; 4) goals for; 5) head-to-head result.

=== Results ===
Home \ Away	ANT	BEE	BRA	DRA	GAN	LEU	LEO	RAC	UCC	VIC	WAT	WEL
Antwerp		25 Apr	0–1	2 May	21 Mar	1–2	2–1	14 Mar	2–1	11 Apr	4–4	9 May
Beerschot	1–2		14 Mar	18 Apr	0–4	2 May	9 May	0–3	21 Mar	2–1	11 Apr	2–2
Braxgata	16 Apr	1–2		0–2	1–2	1–1	3–1	18 Apr	6 May	29 Nov	7 Mar	4 Apr
Dragons	1–0	3–1	25 Apr		2–2	9 May	21 Mar	11 Apr	3–1	3–3	4–0	14 Mar
Gantoise	2–0	16 Apr	2 May	6 May		4 Apr	18 Apr	3–0	29 Nov	7 Mar	3–2	1–0
Leuven	6 May	1–0	21 Mar	29 Nov	4–2		14 Mar	16 Apr	11 Apr	2–0	25 Apr	2–2
Léopold	7 Mar	29 Nov	11 Apr	2–4	1–3	1–4		0–2	25 Apr	4–2	6 May	16 Apr
Racing	1–1	7 Mar	1–1	1–1	25 Apr	1–3	4 Apr		3–0	6 May	29 Nov	1–1
Uccle Sport	4 Apr	2–0	1–1	7 Mar	9 May	0–1	1–1	2 May		1–1	16 Apr	18 Apr
Victory	1–3	4 Apr	9 May	16 Apr	2–3	18 Apr	2 May	0–0	14 Mar		3–2	2–5
Waterloo Ducks	18 Apr	1–1	3–0	4 Apr	14 Mar	1–0	1–1	9 May	3–1	21 Mar		2 May
Wellington	29 Nov	6 May	2–2	2–6	11 Apr	7 Mar	1–0	21 Mar	3–3	25 Apr	0–2	

Updated to match(es) played on 15 November 2026. Source: Carlsberg 0.0 Hockey League Schedule
Legend: Blue = home team win; Yellow = draw; Red = away team win.

== Play-offs ==
=== Bracket ===
Semi-finals
15 & 17 May
1st Regular season	-	-	—
4th Regular season	-	-	—
15 & 17 May
2nd Regular season	-	-	—
3rd Regular season	-	-	—

Final
22 & 23 May - Wavre
Winner semi-final 1	-	-	—
Winner semi-final 2	-	-	—

=== Semi-finals ===
15 May 2027

4th Regular season	v	1st Regular season

17 May 2027

1st Regular season	v	4th Regular season

15 May 2027

3rd Regular season	v	2nd Regular season

17 May 2027

2nd Regular season	v	3rd Regular season

=== Final ===
22 May 2027

Winner semi-final 1	v	Winner semi-final 2

Belfius Hockey Arena, Wavre

23 May 2027

Winner semi-final 2	v	Winner semi-final 1

Belfius Hockey Arena, Wavre

== Relegation play-offs ==
The relegation play-offs took place on 22 and 23 May 2027.

=== Overview ===
Team 1	Agg.	Team 2	1st leg	2nd leg
10th Division Honneur	–	3rd National 1	–	–

=== Matches ===
22 May 2027

10th Division Honneur	v	3rd National 1

23 May 2027

3rd National 1	v	10th Division Honneur

== Top goalscorers ==
Rank	Player	Club	FG	PC	PS	Goals
1			0	0	0	0
2			0	0	0	0
3			0	0	0	0
4			0	0	0	0
5			0	0	0	0
6			0	0	0	0
7			0	0	0	0
8			0	0	0	0
9			0	0	0	0
10			0	0	0	0

== See also ==
- 2026–27 Men's Belgian Hockey League
