= Belgium national field hockey team =

Belgium national field hockey team may refer to:

- Belgium men's national field hockey team
- Belgium women's national field hockey team
