= 2026–27 Men's Belgian Hockey League =

Field hockey league season

Belgian Hockey League
- Season: 2026–27
- Dates: 20 September 2026 – 23 May 2027

The 2026–27 Men's Belgian Hockey League is the 107th season of the Men's Belgian Hockey League, the top men's Belgian field hockey league.

The season started on 20 September 2026 and will conclude on 23 May 2027 with the second match of the championship final. Waterloo Ducks is the defending champions.

== Teams ==
2026–27 Men's Belgian Hockey League teams
Location of Brussels teams in the 2026–27 Men's Belgian Hockey League

Daring and Namur are the two promoted clubs from the 2025–26 National 1, replacing Old Club and Pingouin.

Team	Location	Province
Beerschot	Kontich	Antwerp
Braxgata	Boom	Antwerp
Daring	Molenbeek-Saint-Jean	Brussels
Dragons	Brasschaat	Antwerp
Gantoise	Ghent	East Flanders
Herakles	Lier	Antwerp
Léopold	Uccle	Brussels
Namur	Saint-Servais	Namur
Orée	Woluwe-Saint-Pierre	Brussels
Racing	Uccle	Brussels
Uccle Sport	Uccle	Brussels
Waterloo Ducks	Waterloo	Walloon Brabant

=== Number of teams by provinces ===
Province	Number of teams	Team(s)
Brussels	5	Daring, Léopold, Orée, Racing, Uccle Sport
Antwerp	4	Beerschot, Braxgata, Dragons, Herakles
East Flanders	1	Gantoise
Namur	1	Namur
Walloon Brabant	1	Waterloo Ducks
Total	12	

== Regular season ==
=== Standings ===
Pos	Team	Pld	W	D	L	GF	GA	GD	Pts	Qualification or relegation
1	Léopold	10	6	3	1	30	18	+12	21	Qualification for the play-offs
2	Braxgata	10	6	3	1	29	19	+10	21	Qualification for the play-offs
3	Herakles	10	6	1	3	30	18	+12	19	Qualification for the play-offs
4	Gantoise	10	5	3	2	30	17	+13	18	Qualification for the play-offs
5	Waterloo Ducks	10	5	2	3	27	23	+4	17	
6	Uccle Sport	10	4	4	2	28	19	+9	16	
7	Orée	10	3	5	2	20	12	+8	14	
8	Racing	10	2	4	4	19	21	−2	10	
9	Beerschot	10	2	3	5	21	26	−5	9	
10	Dragons	10	2	2	6	21	29	−8	8	Qualification for the relegation play-offs
11	Daring	10	2	2	6	13	38	−25	8	Relegation to the National 1
12	Namur	10	1	0	9	9	37	−28	3	Relegation to the National 1

Updated to match(es) played on 15 November 2026. Source: Flashscore
Rules for classification: 1) points; 2) matches won; 3) goal difference; 4) goals for; 5) head-to-head result.

=== Results ===
Home \ Away	BEE	BRA	DAR	DRA	GAN	HER	LEO	NAM	ORE	RAC	UCC	WAT
Beerschot	—	14 Mar	2–3	18 Apr	1–4	2–1	9 May	2 May	0–2	1–1	21 Mar	11 Apr
Braxgata	4–2	—	4–1	5–4	3–3	29 Nov	2–2	4–1	4 Apr	18 Apr	6 May	7 Mar
Daring	25 Apr	23 Apr	—	2 May	21 Mar	11 Apr	2–7	1–0	9 May	14 Mar	2–2	1–5
Dragons	4–4	25 Apr	5–0	—	0–2	0–5	21 Mar	9 May	14 Mar	11 Apr	2–2	1–4
Gantoise	23 Apr	2 May	7–0	6 May	—	7 Mar	18 Apr	4 Apr	2–2	4–4	29 Nov	0–2
Herakles	4 Apr	9 May	4–1	23 Apr	3–4	—	2 May	18 Apr	2–2	2–1	14 Mar	3–1
Léopold	29 Nov	11 Apr	7 Mar	2–1	2–0	2–3	—	5–4	23 Apr	2–0	25 Apr	6 May
Namur	0–5	21 Mar	6 May	29 Nov	0–4	1–4	14 Mar	—	0–3	1–2	11 Apr	25 Apr
Orée	6 May	0–1 (Note: Due to the Orée participation at the 2026–27 Men's Euro Hockey League Round1, the Orée - Braxgata match of matchday 5 is postponed to 29 October.)	29 Nov	1–2	11 Apr	25 Apr	1–1	7 Mar	—	21 Mar	1–1	5–0
Racing	7 Mar	1–2	2–2	4–2	25 Apr	6 May	4 Apr	23 Apr	3–3	—	1–2	29 Nov
Uccle Sport	5–2	2–2	4 Apr	7 Mar	9 May	4–3	0–2	8–0	18 Apr	2 May	—	23 Apr
Waterloo Ducks	2–2	3–2	18 Apr	4 Apr	14 Mar	21 Mar	5–5	1–2	2 May	9 May	4–2	—

Updated to match(es) played on 15 November 2026. Source: Flashscore
Legend: Blue = home team win; Yellow = draw; Red = away team win.

== Play-offs ==
=== Bracket ===
Semi-finals
15 & 17 May
1st Regular season	-	-	—
4th Regular season	-	-	—
15 & 17 May
2nd Regular season	-	-	—
3rd Regular season	-	-	—

Final
22 & 23 May - Wavre
Winner semi-final 1	-	-	—
Winner semi-final 2	-	-	—
Third place
22 May - Wavre
Loser semi-final 1	-
Loser semi-final 2	-

=== Semi-finals ===
15 May 2027

4th Regular season	v	1st Regular season

17 May 2027

1st Regular season	v	4th Regular season

15 May 2027

3rd Regular season	v	2nd Regular season

17 May 2027

2nd Regular season	v	3rd Regular season

=== EHL Ticket match ===
22 May 2026

Loser semi-final 1	v	Loser semi-final 2

Belfius Hockey Arena, Wavre

=== Final ===
22 May 2027

Winner semi-final 1	v	Winner semi-final 2

Belfius Hockey Arena, Wavre

23 May 2027

Winner semi-final 2	v	Winner semi-final 1

Belfius Hockey Arena, Wavre

== Relegation play-offs ==
The relegation play-offs took place on 22 and 23 May 2027.

=== Overview ===
Team 1	Agg.	Team 2	1st leg	2nd leg
10th Division Honneur	–	3rd National 1	–	–

=== Matches ===
22 May 2027

10th Division Honneur	v	3rd National 1

23 May 2027

3rd National 1	v	10th Division Honneur

== Top goalscorers ==
Rank	Player	Club	FG	PC	PS	Goals
1			0	0	0	0
2			0	0	0	0
3			0	0	0	0
4			0	0	0	0
5			0	0	0	0
6			0	0	0	0
7			0	0	0	0
8			0	0	0	0
9			0	0	0	0
10			0	0	0	0

== See also ==
- 2026–27 Women's Belgian Hockey League
