= List of protected heritage sites in Wavre =

This table shows an overview of the protected heritage sites in the Walloon town Wavre (Waver in Dutch). This list is part of Belgium's national heritage.

Object	Year/architect	Town/section	Address	Coordinates	Number^{?}	Image
town hall ^{(nl)} ^{(fr)}		Wavre		50.715966°N 4.608099°E	25112-CLT-0001-01	Stadhuis
Church of Saint-Jean Baptiste ^{(nl)} ^{(fr)}		Wavre		50.717120°N 4.610944°E	25112-CLT-0002-01	Kerk Saint-Jean Baptiste
Church of Notre Dame ^{(nl)} ^{(fr)}		Wavre		50.723845°N 4.625218°E	25112-CLT-0004-01	Kerk Notre-Dame
Substructure of the ancient Roman villa and its surroundings ^{(nl)} ^{(fr)}		Wavre		50.727019°N 4.616219°E	25112-CLT-0005-01	
Chapel of Grimohaye ^{(nl)} ^{(fr)}		Wavre		50.693737°N 4.561699°E	25112-CLT-0006-01	
Girls' School: walls and roofs ^{(nl)} ^{(fr)}		Wavre	rue Florimond Letroye, n°2	50.715578°N 4.614600°E	25112-CLT-0008-01	
Deanery of the Church of Saint-Jean Baptiste: facades and roofs, as well as the wall in front of a central pavilion at the entrance ^{(nl)} ^{(fr)}		Wavre		50.717321°N 4.611967°E	25112-CLT-0011-01	
Marais de Laurensart ^{(nl)} ^{(fr)}		Wavre		50.730684°N 4.635188°E	25112-CLT-0014-01	
Substructure of the ancient Roman villa and its surroundings ^{(nl)} ^{(fr)}		Wavre		50.727019°N 4.616219°E	25112-PEX-0001-01	

== See also ==
- Lists of protected heritage sites in Walloon Brabant
- Wavre
