= Royal Belgian Hockey Association =

Governing body of field hockey in Belgium

Royal Belgian Hockey Association Koninklijke Belgische Hockey Bond Association Royale Belge de Hockey
- Sport: Field Hockey
- Jurisdiction: Belgium
- Founded: 1907
- Affiliation: FIH
- Regional affiliation: Europe (EHF)
- Location: Brussels
- Chairman: Patrick Keusters

Official website
- hockey.be
- (Belgium)

The Royal Belgian Hockey Association (Dutch: Koninklijke Belgische Hockey Bond; French: Association Royale Belge de Hockey) is the governing body for the game of (field) hockey in Belgium. It was formed in 1907 and as of 2014 it is presided by Marc Coudron.

Since 2012, the association has two affiliated branches that entirely govern the sport at regional level; these are the Vlaamse Hockey League (Dutch-speaking) and the Ligue Francophone de Hockey (French-speaking). This split was due to the recognition and awarding of subsidies that are in the authority of the Flemish- and French-speaking Communities. As a matter of consequence, only the top division leagues for men and women are still organised at the national level.

While the administrative centre lies in Brussels, the National Training Centre is situated in Boom.

Logo used until 2025

== Chairmen ==
- Count Joseph d'Oultremont (1912-1913)
- Victor de Laveleye (1931-1946)
- Louis Diercxens (1946-1959)
- Fred Pringiers (1959-1974)
- Vincent Vandermeersch (1974-1982)
- Raymond Distave (1982-1985)
- Robert Lycke (1985-1994)
- Jean-Claude Le Clef (1994-2005)
- Marc Coudron (2005-2021)
- Patrick Keusters (since 2021)

== See also ==
- Belgium men's national field hockey team
- Belgium women's national field hockey team
