= 1999 Men's Oceania Cup =

Men's field hockey tournament

1999 Oceania Cup
Tournament details
- Host country: Australia
- City: Brisbane
- Dates: 13–16 May

Final positions
- Champions: Australia (1st title)
- Runner-up: New Zealand

Tournament statistics
- Matches played: 3
- Goals scored: 18 (6 per match)

The 1999 Men's Oceania Cup was the second edition of the men's field hockey tournament. It was held from 13 to 16 May 1999 in Brisbane, Australia.

The tournament served as a qualifier for the 2000 Summer Olympics.

Australia won the tournament for the first time, defeating New Zealand in the three–game series, with two wins and one loss.

== Results ==
All times are local (AEST).

=== Pool ===
Pos	Team	Pld	W	D	L	GF	GA	GD	Pts	Qualification
1	Australia	3	2	0	1	13	5	+8	6	2000 Summer Olympics
2	New Zealand	3	1	0	2	5	13	−8	3	

Source: Clearing House
Rules for classification: 1) points; 2) goal difference; 3) goals scored; 4) head-to-head result.

=== Fixtures ===
13 May 1999

Australia	5–2	New Zealand

15 May 1999

Australia	6–0	New Zealand

16 May 1999

Australia	2–3	New Zealand

== Final standings ==
1. Australia
2. New Zealand
