= Field hockey at the 2028 Summer Olympics =

Field hockey at the Games of the XXXIV Olympiad
- Dates: 12–29 July 2028

The field hockey tournaments at the 2028 Summer Olympics in Los Angeles are scheduled to be held from 12th to 29th July 2028 in Carson Field, regularly known as Dignity Health Sports Park. Twenty-four teams (twelve each for men and women) will compete in their respective tournaments.

== Competition schedule ==
The preliminary match schedule was released on November 12, 2025.

P	Preliminary stage	¼	Quarter-finals	½	Semi-finals	B	Bronze medal match	G	Gold medal match

Date Event	Wed 12	Thu 13	Fri 14	Sat 15	Sun 16	Mon 17	Tue 18	Wed 19	Thu 20	Fri 21	Sat 22	Sun 23	Mon 24	Tue 25	Wed 26	Thu 27	Fri 28		Sat 29	
Men	P			P	P	P		P	P		P		¼		½		B	G		
Women		P		P		P	P		P	P		P		¼		½			B	G

== Venue ==
Carson Field, within the Dignity Health Sports Park complex, will host the field hockey competition.

(United States) Carson
Carson Field
Capacity: 15,000 (primary field)
5,000 (secondary field)

== Qualification ==
The International Olympic Committee and the International Hockey Federation (FIH) ratified and released the qualification criteria for 2028 Summer Olympics on 11 December 2025. The host nation, United States of America, received a direct quota place each in the men's and women's tournament.

=== Qualification summary ===
Nation	Men's	Women's	Athletes
Belgium	Yes		16
India	Yes	Yes	32
Netherlands		Yes	16
United States	Yes	Yes	32
Total: 4 NOCs	3/12	3/12	96/384

=== Men's qualification ===
Qualification	Date	Host/Country	Berths	Qualified team
Host country	—N/a		1	United States
2025–26 FIH Pro League	9 December 2025 – 28 June 2026	Various	1	Belgium
2026 Asian Games	18 September – 3 October 2026	Kakamigahara	1	India
2026–27 FIH Pro League	8 December 2026 – 20 June 2027	Various	1	
2027 Pan American Games	27 July – 6 August 2027	Lima	1	
2027 EuroHockey Championship	28 July – 8 August 2027	London	1	
2027 Oceania Cup	September 2027 (TBC)	TBC	1	
2027 African Olympic Qualifier	2027 (TBC)	TBC	1	
2028 FIH Hockey Olympic Qualifiers	March 2028 (TBC)	TBC	2	
2028 FIH Hockey Olympic Qualifiers	March 2028 (TBC)	TBC	2	
Total			12	

=== Women's qualification ===
Qualification	Date	Host/Country	Berths	Qualified team
Host country	—N/a		1	United States
2025–26 FIH Pro League	9 December 2025 – 28 June 2026	Various	1	Netherlands
2026 Asian Games	18 September – 3 October 2026	Kakamigahara	1	India
2026–27 FIH Pro League	8 December 2026 – 20 June 2027	Various	1	
2027 Pan American Games	27 July – 6 August 2027	Lima	1	
2027 EuroHockey Championship	28 July – 8 August 2027	London	1	
2027 Oceania Cup	September 2027 (TBC)	TBC	1	
2027 African Olympic Qualifier	TBC	TBC	1	
2028 FIH Hockey Olympic Qualifiers	March 2028 (TBC)	TBC	2	
2028 FIH Hockey Olympic Qualifiers	March 2028 (TBC)	TBC	2	
Total			12	

== Medalists ==
Event	Gold	Silver	Bronze
Men's tournament			
Women's tournament			
