= 2021 EuroHockey Nations Championship =

2021 EuroHockey Nations Championship may refer to:

- 2021 Women's EuroHockey Nations Championship
- 2021 Men's EuroHockey Nations Championship
