= 2023 EuroHockey Championships =

2023 EuroHockey Championships may refer to:

- 2023 Women's EuroHockey Championship
- 2023 Men's EuroHockey Championship
