= Birsa Munda International Hockey Stadium =

Field hockey stadium in Odisha, India

Birsa Munda Hockey Stadium
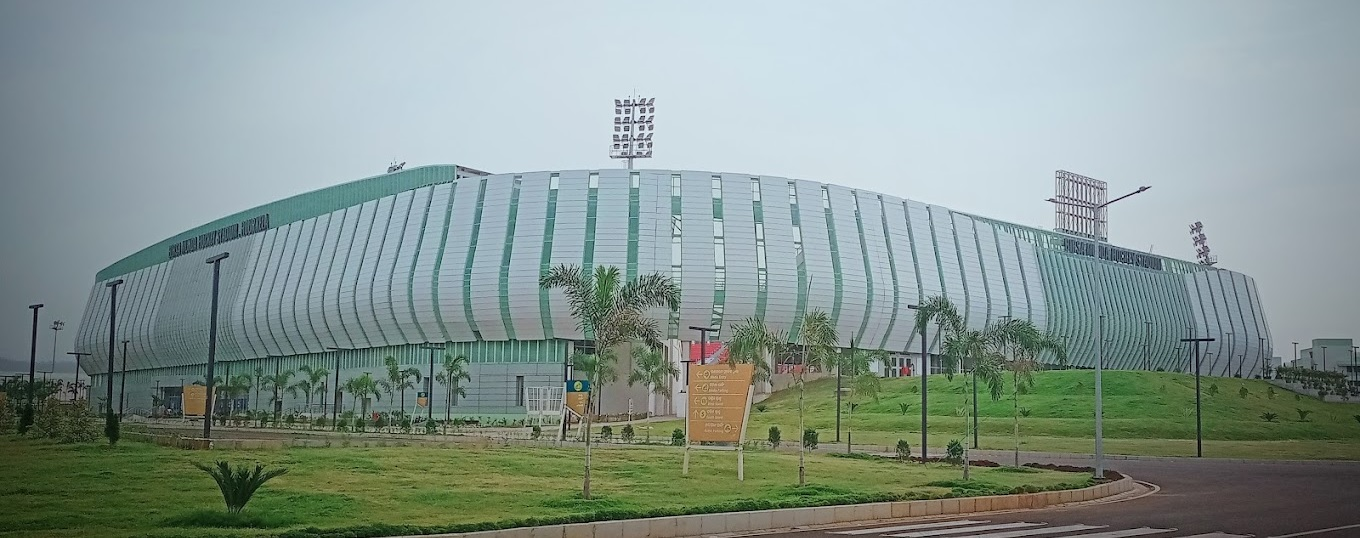
- A view of the stadium in 2023
- Interactive map of Birsa Munda Hockey Stadium
- Full name: Birsa Munda Hockey Stadium
- Location: Rourkela, Odisha, India
- Coordinates: 22°14′43.17″N 84°48′49.2192″E
- Owner: Government of Odisha
- Operator: Department of Sports and Youth Services (DSYS)
- Capacity: 21,800
- Surface: Astro-Turf

Construction
- Opened: 5 January 2023
- Cost: ₹260 Crore ($31 million)

Tenant
- India men's national field hockey team

The Birsa Munda Hockey Stadium is an international field hockey stadium situated at Rourkela, India. The stadium has been named after the tribal leader, Birsa Munda, who was a famous freedom fighter from Khunti, Jharkhand. With a seating capacity of 21,800 permanent seats, it is officially recognised by the Guinness World Records as the largest fully seated hockey arena in the world on January 29, 2023.

== History ==
When India was bidding for the 2023 Men's FIH Hockey World Cup, it was decided that another hockey stadium would be built in Odisha. The government then allotted 6 hectares of land for building the stadium. The responsibility of constructing the stadium was handed over to Odisha Industrial Infrastructure Development Corporation (IDCO). The chairman of IDCO, Sanjay Kumar Singh, also said, "The Government of Odisha has assigned us to construct a world class stadium for the Men's Hockey World Cup 2023 within the given timeline of 12 months." The foundation stone of the stadium was laid by the Chief Minister of Odisha, Naveen Patnaik in February 2021. It was inaugurated by Chief Minister Patnaik on 5 January 2023.

It is also the fourth largest field hockey stadium in the world. Unlike the other top three stadiums, which are terrace stadiums and are part of multi-purpose sports complex, this stadium is the largest all-seater field hockey-specific stadium which was solely constructed for conducting field hockey matches.

== Hockey World Cup ==
The Birsa Munda International Hockey Stadium was being built exclusively to host the 2023 Men's FIH Hockey World Cup. This was the fourth time India hosted this event and it was also the second time the World Cup was hosted in Odisha. The 2023 version of the cup held jointly between two cities in the state of Odisha, Bhubaneswar and Rourkela. Along with the Birsa Munda International Hockey Stadium, the Kalinga Stadium in Bhubaneswar was the other venue for the event.

== Events ==
=== International ===
| Event | Year | Organiser | Dates |
|---|---|---|---|
| Men's FIH Hockey World Cup | 2023 | Hockey India | 13–29 January 2023 |
| Men's FIH Pro League | 2022–23 | Hockey India | 10–15 March 2023 |
| Women's FIH Pro League | 2023–24 | Hockey India | 12–25 February 2024 |
| Men's FIH Pro League | 2023–24 | Hockey India | 12–25 February 2024 |
| Men's FIH Pro League | 2025–26 | Hockey India | 10–15 February 2026 |

=== National ===
| Event | Year | Organiser | Dates |
|---|---|---|---|
| Sub-Junior Women's National Championship | 2023 | Hockey India | 4–14 May 2023 |
| Sub-Junior Men's National Championship | 2023 | Hockey India | 18–28 May 2023 |
| Junior Women's National Championship | 2023 | Hockey India | 12–22 June 2023 |
| Junior Men's National Championship | 2023 | Hockey India | 27 June–7 July 2023 |
| Hockey India League | 2024–25 | Hockey India | 28 December 2024 – 1 February 2025 |
