= Estadio Betero =

Sports and leisure venue in Valencia, Spain

Estadio Betero is a sports and leisure venue located in Valencia, in Spain. It is currently mainly used for field hockey matches and matches organized for major competitions.

In the past, the stadium has hosted the following major tournaments:

- 2012–13 Men's FIH Hockey World League Round 2 - 25 February – 3 March 2013
- 2014–15 Men's FIH Hockey World League Semifinals - 10 – 21 June 2015
- 2016–17 Men's FIH Hockey World League Round 2 - 4 – 12 February 2017
- 2019 Men's FIH Pro League - 19 January – 15 March 2019
- 2020–21 Men's FIH Pro League - 24 January 2020 – 6 February 2021
- 2021–22 Men's FIH Pro League - 4 February – 18 May 2022
- 2022 Women's FIH Hockey Nations Cup - 10 – 17 December 2022

Its location is Carrer de Campillo de Altobuey, 1 in Valencia.
