= Gold Coast Hockey Centre =

Hockey stadium in Gold Coast, Queensland

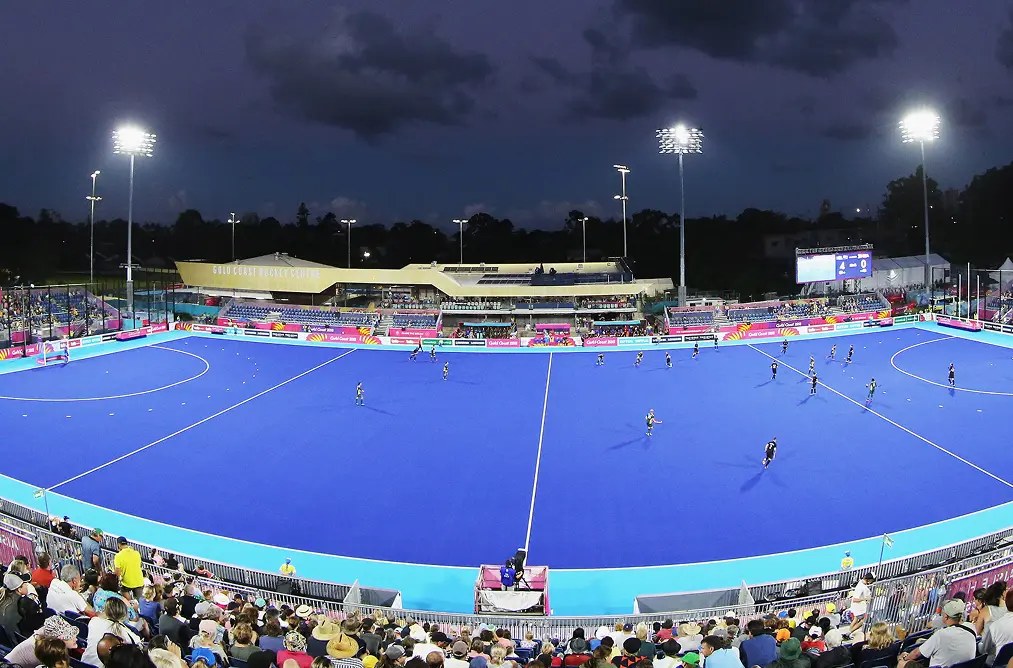
- Gold Coast Hockey Centre
- Interactive map of Gold Coast Hockey Centre
- Coordinates: 27°57′15″S 153°23′38″E
- Event: field hockey
- Surface: Astroturf

Tenants
- Gold Coast Hockey Association; Labrador Hockey Club

Website
- www.gchmg.org

Gold Coast Hockey Centre is a hockey stadium in Gold Coast, Queensland, Australia. The venue was renovated to host the men's and women's hockey event of the 2018 Commonwealth Games. It was redeveloped for $16.5 million and was completed in June 2017. It is located at Keith Hunt Park in Labrador and is home to the Gold Coast Hockey Association and the Labrador Hockey Club.
