= Belfius Hockey Arena =

Former football stadium in Wavre, Belgium Belgium

Stade Justin Peeters
- Interactive map of Stade Justin Peeters
- Location: Wavre, Belgium
- Coordinates: 50°43′13″N 4°37′7″E
- Owner: Municipality of Wavre
- Capacity: 5,000
- Surface: carbon fibre

Construction
- Opened: 1923
- Renovated: 2021

The Stade Justin Peeters is a former football stadium located in Wavre near Brussels, Belgium and the former homeground of Racing Jet Wavre, that had come over the years to be found in the northeast of the city center under the significant address Avenue du Centre Sportif. From 2023 through 2026 the city converted it to a hockey stadium for the national teams.

The stadium contained two football stands which were located on either side of the pitch, which was enough to host football matches with a few hundreds of spectators. This also prevented undeveloped space behind the goals going into further disrepair. When this stadium hosted matches, the main grandstand would be raised up, providing up to 15 football seats without backrests. Within the main grandstand’s interior are the dressing rooms and facilities for the teams.

During 2023, years after the football club ceased to exist, work began to convert the grounds into a hockey stadion that serves as the home ground of Belgium’s national teams. Work concluded in early 2026 and the new stadium, named the Belfius Hockey Arena, was inaugurated during April of that year.

== See also ==
- Racing Jet Wavre Football Club
