= FIH Para Hockey World Cup =

International para hockey competition

- Current season, competition or edition: 2026 FIH Para Hockey World Cup
- Sport: Para hockey
- Founded: 2026
- No. of teams: 16
- Region: International (FIH)
- Most recent champion: Italy
- Most titles: Italy (1 Title)
- Website: fih.hockey/para world-cup

The FIH Para Hockey World Cup is an international para hockey competition organised by the International Hockey Federation. The tournament's first edition started in 2026. The tournament features mixed-gender national teams, allowing male and female athletes to compete together in the same team under the FIH Hockey ID regulations.

The inaugural tournament was hosted by Belgium and the Netherlands, alongside the 2026 Men's and Women's Hockey World Cups. Italy won the first ever World Cup tournament, beating Spain in the final by 5–4.

== History ==
The concept of an international world championship for para hockey emerged as part of the International Hockey Federation's (FIH) strategy to expand opportunities for athletes with disabilities and promote inclusive participation in field hockey. In June 2023, the FIH signed a partnership agreement with Special Olympics to support the global development of Hockey ID (para hockey for athletes with intellectual disabilities) and to increase opportunities for international competition.

On 30 September 2025, the FIH announced the inaugural FIH Para Hockey World Cup, to be held from 21 to 25 August 2026 in Belgium and the Netherlands alongside the 2026 Men's and Women's FIH Hockey World Cups. The tournament has been established as the first official world championship organised by the FIH for para hockey and features sixteen national Hockey ID teams competing in a six-a-side format.

== Results ==
=== Summaries ===
| Year | Host | Final | | | Third place match | | | Number of teams |
| Year | Host | Winner | Score | Runner-up | Third place | Score | Fourth place | Number of teams |
|---|---|---|---|---|---|---|---|---|
| 2026; Details | Louvain-la-Neuve and Wavre, Belgium; Amstelveen, Netherlands | Italy | 5–4 | Spain | Malaysia | 3–1 | Belgium | 16 |

=== Successful national teams ===
Teams reaching the top four
| Team | Champions | Runners-up | Third place | Fourth place |
|---|---|---|---|---|
| Italy | 1 (2026) | | | |
| Spain | | 1 (2026) | | |
| Malaysia | | | 1 (2026) | |
| Belgium | | | | 1 (2026*) |

* = host country

== Team appearances ==
| Team | (Belgium) (Netherlands) 2026 | Total |
|---|---|---|
| Argentina | 13th | 1 |
| Belgium | 4th | 1 |
| Bulgaria | 5th | 1 |
| Chile | 15th | 1 |
| England | 9th | 1 |
| France | 7th | 1 |
| Germany | 5th | 1 |
| India | 11th | 1 |
| (Republic of Ireland) Ireland | 11th | 1 |
| Italy | 1st | 1 |
| Malaysia | 3rd | 1 |
| Netherlands | 7th | 1 |
| Pakistan | 9th | 1 |
| Spain | 2nd | 1 |
| United States | 13th | 1 |
| Zambia | 15th | 1 |
| Total (16) | 16 | |

== Debut of teams ==
| Year | Debutants | Total |
|---|---|---|
| 2026 | Argentina, Belgium, Bulgaria, Chile, England, France, Germany, India, (Republic of Ireland) Ireland, Italy, Malaysia, Netherlands, Pakistan, Spain, United States, Zambia | 16 |
| Total | | 16 |

== See also ==
- Field hockey at the Summer Olympics
- Men's FIH Hockey World Cup
- Men's FIH Hockey Junior World Cup
- Men's FIH Indoor Hockey World Cup
- Women's FIH Indoor Hockey World Cup
- Women's FIH Hockey World Cup
- Women's FIH Hockey Junior World Cup
