= 2026 Men's FIH Hockey World Cup final =

International field hockey match

- The Belfius Hockey Arena hosted the final.
- Event: 2026 Men's FIH Hockey World Cup
| Spain | Germany |
| 0 | 1 |
- Date: 30 August 2026
- Venue: Belfius Hockey Arena, Wavre
- Man of the Match: Christopher Rühr (Germany)
- Referee: Gareth Greenfield (New Zealand); Coen van Bunge (Netherlands)

The 2026 Men's FIH Hockey World Cup final was the final match of the 2026 Men's FIH Hockey World Cup, the 16th edition of the quadrennial world championship for men's national field hockey teams organized by the International Hockey Federation. The match was played at Belfius Hockey Arena in Wavre, Belgium, on 30 August 2026, and was contested by Spain and defending champions Germany.

The tournament involved co-hosts Belgium and Netherlands alongside 14 other teams. The 16 teams competed in a group stage, from which 8 teams qualified for the second round and 4 later advanced to the semifinals.

For Spain, it was the third final and it was the sixth final for the Germans. The two teams met earlier in the tournament, with the Spanish winning 2–1. It was the first time the two teams met in a World Cup final.

Michel Struthoff's solitary goal helped Germany retain their title.

== Background ==
The 2026 Men's FIH Hockey World Cup was the 16th edition of the Men's FIH Hockey World Cup, the quadrennial world championship for men's national field hockey teams organized by the International Hockey Federation. It was held from 15 to 30 August 2026 in Wavre, Belgium and Amstelveen, Netherlands.

Belgium and Netherlands were given the hosting rights in November 2022, beating a joint bid from England and Wales as well as a South African bid in the process. This was the first time the men's event was co-hosted. This also marked Belgium's first and Netherlands' fourth time hosting. This was also the first time the men's and women's world cup were held as one joint tournament.

16 teams participated for the third time after the expansion in 2018. Qualification was an amalgamation of the FIH Pro League, continental championships and the World Cup Qualifiers. Qualification took place from December 2023 to March 2026 to decide the qualifiers.

Germany were the defending champions having defeated Belgium 5–4 in a shootout after the match finished 3–3 in regular time in Bhubaneswar.

== Route to the final ==
Note: In all results below, the score of the finalist is given first.

Spain
Round
Germany
Opponent
Result
First round
Opponent
Result
South Africa
3–1
Match 1
Malaysia
5–1
Australia
0–1
Match 2
Belgium
1–0
Ireland
3–1
Match 3
France
1–1
Pool A placement

| Pos | Team | Pld | Pts |
|---|---|---|---|
| 1 | Australia | 3 | 7 |
| 2 | Spain | 3 | 6 |
| 3 | Ireland | 3 | 3 |
| 4 | South Africa | 3 | 1 |

Source: FIH
Final standings
Pool B placement

| Pos | Team | Pld | Pts |
|---|---|---|---|
| 1 | Germany | 3 | 7 |
| 2 | Belgium (H) | 3 | 6 |
| 3 | France | 3 | 2 |
| 4 | Malaysia | 3 | 1 |

Source: FIH
(H) Hosts
Opponent
Result
Second round
Opponent
Result
Germany
2–1
Match 4
Spain
1–2
Belgium
1–1
Match 5
Australia
4–2
Pool F placement

| Pos | Team | Pld | Pts |
|---|---|---|---|
| 1 | Germany | 3 | 6 |
| 2 | Spain | 3 | 4 |
| 3 | Australia | 3 | 4 |
| 4 | Belgium (H) | 3 | 2 |

Source: FIH
(H) Hosts
Final standings
Pool F placement

| Pos | Team | Pld | Pts |
|---|---|---|---|
| 1 | Germany | 3 | 6 |
| 2 | Spain | 3 | 4 |
| 3 | Australia | 3 | 4 |
| 4 | Belgium (H) | 3 | 2 |

Source: FIH
(H) Hosts
Opponent
Result
Knockout stage
Opponent
Result
Netherlands
4–3
Semifinals
Argentina
2–1

== Venue ==
The Belfius Hockey Arena hosted the final for the first time.

| 2026 Men's FIH Hockey World Cup final is located in Belgium | Wavre |
|---|---|
| 2026 Men's FIH Hockey World Cup final is located in Belgium | Belfius Hockey Arena |
| 2026 Men's FIH Hockey World Cup final is located in Belgium | Capacity: 10,000 |

== Match ==
30 August 2026
16:30

| Spain | 0–1 | Germany |
|---|---|---|
| | Report | Struthoff 44' |

Belfius Hockey Arena, Wavre
Attendance: 10,000
Umpires:
Gareth Greenfield (NZL)
Coen van Bunge (NED)

Spain
| Num | Pos | Player | Goals | FGS | PCS | PSS |
|---|---|---|---|---|---|---|
| 15 | GK | Luis Calzado | 0 | 0 | 0 | 0 |
| 2 | DF | Alejandro Alonso | 0 | 0 | 0 | 0 |
| 5 | DF | Jordi Bonastre | 0 | 0 | 0 | 0 |
| 8 | DF | Marc Recasens | 0 | 0 | 0 | 0 |
| 17 | DF | Pepe Cunill | 0 | 0 | 0 | 0 |
| 14 | DM | Marc Miralles (C) | 0 | 0 | 0 | 0 |
| 6 | AM | Xavier Gispert | 0 | 0 | 0 | 0 |
| 9 | FW | Borja Lacalle | 0 | 0 | 0 | 0 |
| 10 | FW | José Basterra | 0 | 0 | 0 | 0 |
| 11 | FW | Gerard Clapés | 0 | 0 | 0 | 0 |
| 26 | FW | Bruno Font | 0 | 0 | 0 | 0 |
Substitutions
| 16 | GK | Rafael Revilla | 0 | 0 | 0 | 0 |
| 23 | DF | Marc Vizcaino | 0 | 0 | 0 | 0 |
| 35 | DF | Iñaky Zaldúa | 0 | 0 | 0 | 0 |
| 18 | DM | Joaquín Menini | 0 | 0 | 0 | 0 |
| 22 | AM | Pol Cabré-Verdiell | 0 | 0 | 0 | 0 |
| 12 | FW | Marc Reyné | 0 | 0 | 0 | 0 |
| 28 | FW | Nicolás Álvarez | 0 | 0 | 0 | 0 |
Head coach
(Argentina) Max Caldas

| Spain | Statistics | Germany |
|---|---|---|
| 4 | PCE | 1 |
| 0% | PC EFF | 0% |
| 0 | PSE | 0 |
| 0% | PS EFF | 0% |

Cards
| Team | Q1 | Q2 | Q3 | Q4 |
|---|---|---|---|---|
| Spain | 0 | 0 | 0 | 0 |
| Germany | 0 | 0 | 0 | 1 |

Reviews
| Team | Q1 | Q2 | Q3 | Q4 | PS |
|---|---|---|---|---|---|
| Spain | 0 | 0 | 0 | 0 | 0 |
| Germany | 0 | 0 | 0 | 0 | 0 |
| Umpire | 0 | 0 | 0 | 0 | 0 |

Penalty corners
| Spain | Germany |
|---|---|
| 1 (08:30) | 1 (01:30) |
| 2 (38:45) | |
| 3 (44:29) | |
| 4 (44:33) | |

Germany
| Num | Pos | Player | Goals | FGS | PCS | PSS |
|---|---|---|---|---|---|---|
| 74 | GK | Jean Danneberg | 0 | 0 | 0 | 0 |
| 8 | DF | Benedikt Schwarzhaupt | 0 | 0 | 0 | 0 |
| 14 | DF | Teo Hinrichs | 0 | 0 | 0 | 0 |
| 15 | DF | Tom Grambusch (C) | 0 | 0 | 0 | 0 |
| 44 | DF | Moritz Ludwig | 0 | 0 | 0 | 0 |
| 10 | MF | Johannes Große | 0 | 0 | 0 | 0 |
| 22 | MF | Hugo von Montgelas | 0 | 0 | 0 | 0 |
| 25 | MF | Hannes Müller | 0 | 0 | 0 | 0 |
| 11 | FW | Thies Prinz | 0 | 0 | 0 | 0 |
| 17 | FW | Christopher Rühr | 0 | 0 | 0 | 0 |
| 19 | FW | Justus Weigand | 0 | 0 | 0 | 0 |
Substitutions
| 39 | GK | Joshua Onyekwue Nnaji | 0 | 0 | 0 | 0 |
| 7 | | Justus Warweg 49' | 0 | 0 | 0 | 0 |
| 13 | | Paul-Philipp Kaufmann | 0 | 0 | 0 | 0 |
| 21 | | Michel Struthoff | 1 | 1 | 0 | 0 |
| 24 | | Erik Kleinlein | 0 | 0 | 0 | 0 |
| 34 | | Jakob Brilla | 0 | 0 | 0 | 0 |
| 38 | | Antheus Barry | 0 | 0 | 0 | 0 |
Head coach
André Henning

Technical official:
(Argentina) Adrian Della Mattia
Scoring judge:
(Japan) Eddie Nishizawa
Timing judge:
(New Zealand) Jackie Tomlinson
Video umpire:
(Australia) David Tomlinson
Reserve umpire:
(Netherlands) Coen van Bunge

Match rules

- Four quarters of 15 minutes (60 minutes in total)
- Penalty shoot-out if scores still level.

== Squads ==
Spain
2. Alejandro Alonso
5. Jordi Bonastre
6. Xavier Gispert
7. Rafael Vilallonga
8. Marc Recasens
9. Borja Lacalle
10. José Basterra
11. Gerard Clapés
12. Marc Reyné
14. Marc Miralles (C)
15. Luis Calzado (GK)
16. Rafael Revilla (GK)
17. Pepe Cunill
18. Joaquín Menini
22. Pol Cabré-Verdiell
23. Marc Vizcaíno
26. Bruno Font
28. Nicolás Álvarez
35. Iñaky Zaldúa
62. Ignacio Cobos

Germany
5. Linus Müller
7. Justus Warweg
8. Benedikt Schwarzhaupt
10. Johannes Große
11. Thies Prinz
13. Paul-Philipp Kaufmann
14. Teo Hinrichs
15. Tom Grambusch (C)
17. Christopher Rühr
19. Justus Weigand
21. Michel Struthoff
22. Hugo von Montgelas
24. Erik Kleinlein
25. Hannes Müller
29. Malte Hellwig
34. Jakob Brilla
38. Antheus Barry
39. Joshua Onyekwue-Nnaji (GK)
44. Moritz Ludwig
74. Jean Danneberg (GK)
