= India national para hockey team =

India
- Association: Special Olympics Bharat
- Head Coach: Daljender Singh
- Captain: Amandeep
- Top scorer: Taslimbhai Rajpura (17 goals)

First international
- England 6–3 India (Amstelveen, 20 August 2026)

Last international
- England 2–2 India (Amstelveen, 24 August 2026)

Biggest win
- India 10–1 Chile (Amstelveen, 23 August 2026)

Para Hockey World Cup
- Appearances: 1 (first in 2026)
- Best result: 11th (2026)

The India national para hockey team represents India at the international para hockey tournaments, played by mixed-gender teams in 6-a-side format. The team is overseen by Special Olympics Bharat.

== History ==
India joined the FIH para hockey family with Hockey ID (players with Intellectual disability) in November 2025. The team competed at the inaugural 2026 Para Hockey World Cup, hosted by Belgium and the Netherlands. They finished 11th among 16. The team has been coached by Daljender Singh and Rajeswari Panduri.

== Tournament record ==
=== Para Hockey World Cup ===
Para Hockey World Cup
Year	Host	Round	Position	Pld	W	D	L	GF	GA
2026	Belgium; Netherlands	Group stage	11th	8	2	1	5	28	33

== Squad ==
The National camp was conducted in Faridabad to select the squad for the 2026 FIH Para Hockey World Cup. Special Olympics Bharat announced the squad on 8th August 2026, that represented India at the World Cup. Suraj Biju, a football aspirant from Kerala who later switched to hockey and two girls from Jhajjar named Tamanna and Sakshi were selected for the team among the 10.

Head Coach: (India) Daljender Singh

1. Eshaan Singh(GK)
3. Jivan
4. Amandeep(C)
5. Tamanna
6. Suraj Biju
7. Taslimbhai Rajpura
8. Mamta
9. Anamika Kanwar(GK)
10. Sakshi
14. Jaganmohanreddy Ciyeti

=== Team staff ===
Position	Name
Head coach	(India) Daljender Singh
Coach	(India) Rajeswari Panduri
Team Manager	(India) Vikram Singh
Stand-In Manager	(India) Pratiek Talukdar
Physiotherapist	(India) Manvendra Kushwah

Source: FIH

== Results and fixtures ==
The following is a list of match results in the last 12 months, as well as any future matches that have been scheduled.

Win Draw Loss Fixture

=== 2026 ===
All times are local (UTC+5:30).

20 August 2026 World Cup Pool B	England	6–3	India	Amstelveen, Netherlands
15:00	Crosse 1', 9', 13'; Davey 8', 23'; Graham 24'	Report	Rajpura 10', 16', 17'	Stadium: Myra Hockey Club

20 August 2026 World Cup Pool B	Bulgaria	7–2	India	Amstelveen, Netherlands
19:45	Angel 2', 12', 14', 16', 18', 22', 23'	Report	Rajpura 9', 19'	Stadium: Myra Hockey Club

21 August 2026 World Cup Pool B	Spain	5–2	India	Amstelveen, Netherlands
14:45	Salmeron 6'; Campabadal 11', 20'; Lachica 13'; Galindo 25'	Report	Rajpura 18', 26'	Stadium: Myra Hockey Club

21 August 2026 World Cup Pool B	Netherlands	5–0	India	Amstelveen, Netherlands
19:45	Gosselink 10', 14'; Laan 17'; Robertson 23'; Esser 25'	Report		Stadium: Myra Hockey Club

22 August 2026 World Cup Pool B	India	2–7	Malaysia	Amstelveen, Netherlands
14:45	Jivan 4'; Biju 13'	Report	Lourdess-Raj 1', 9', 12', 19', 22', 27'; Muhammad-Rafiq 23'	Stadium: Myra Hockey Club

22 August 2026 World Cup Pool B	Argentina	0–7	India	Amstelveen, Netherlands
18:30		Report	Rajpura 5', 6', 9', 14', 30'; Biju 24', 25'	Stadium: Myra Hockey Club

23 August 2026 World Cup Pool B	India	10–1	Chile	Amstelveen, Netherlands
18:30	Rajpura 6', 11', 17', 17'; Biju 9', 29'; Jivan 12', 14', 20', 24'	Report	Hernandez 25'	Stadium: Myra Hockey Club

24 August 2026 World Cup 9–12th place	England	2–2	India	Amstelveen, Netherlands
14:55	Shaw 20', 24'	Report	Biju 11'; Rajpura 23'	Stadium: Wagener Stadium

== Head-to-head record ==
Won more matches than lost
All matches drawn
Won equal matches to lost
Lost more matches than won

Record last updated as of the following match:

India vs England at Wagener Stadium, Amstelveen in the 2026 FIH Para Hockey World Cup, 24 August 2026

Opponent	GP	W	D	L	Win %	Last meeting
Argentina	1	1	0	0	100%	2026
Bulgaria	1	0	0	1	0%	2026
Chile	1	1	0	0	100%	2026
England	2	0	1	1	0%	2026
Malaysia	1	0	0	1	0%	2026
Netherlands	1	0	0	1	0%	2026
Spain	1	0	0	1	0%	2026
Total	8	2	1	5	25.00%	2026

== See also ==
Indian national hockey teams
Men's					Women's				
Senior	Under-21	Under-18	Senior Hockey5s	Under-18 hockey5s	Senior	Under-21	Under-18	Senior Hockey5s	Under-18 hockey5s

- Field hockey in India
