= 2026 FIH Para Hockey World Cup =

Ongoing field hockey competition

Tournament details
- Host countries: Belgium; Netherlands
- Cities: Wavre; Amstelveen
- Dates: 20–24 August
- Teams: 16 (from 4 confederations)
- Venue: 4 (in 3 host cities)

Final positions
- Champions: Italy (1st title)
- Runner-up: Spain
- Third place: Malaysia

Tournament statistics
- Matches played: 64
- Goals scored: 444 (6.94 per match)
- Top scorer: (Bulgaria) Hilendarov Angel (31 goals)
- Best player: (Bulgaria) Hilendarov Angel
- Best goalkeeper: (Netherlands) Jorden van der Meer

The 2026 FIH Para Hockey World Cup was the first edition of the FIH Para Hockey World Cup, the world championship for national para hockey teams organized by the International Hockey Federation. It was held from 20 to 24 August 2026 in Louvain-la-Neuve and Wavre in Belgium and Amstelveen in Netherlands.

The tournament was contested by 16 national teams in a 6-a-side format, with mixed-gender teams comprising male and female athletes competing together under the FIH Hockey ID Rules. One notable difference in rules is the lack of penalty corners, which are replaced by a one-v-one shootout. The attacker is given 10 seconds to score on the goalie from the halfway line. It was held alongside the 2026 Men's and Women's World Cups in Belgium and the Netherlands. Italy won the first ever World Cup tournament, beating Spain in the final by 5–4.

== Teams ==
The International Hockey Federation (FIH) invited national associations to participate in the inaugural tournament. Sixteen national teams accepted the invitation and were confirmed for the competition. On 2 April 2026, the FIH announced the participating teams and the pool allocation for the tournament.

- Argentina
- Belgium
- Bulgaria
- Chile
- England
- France
- Germany
- India
- Ireland
- Italy
- Malaysia
- Netherlands
- Pakistan
- Spain
- United States
- Zambia

== Format ==
The tournament featured 16 national teams divided into two pools of eight.

During the pool stage, held from 20 to 23 August 2026, each team played every other team in its pool once, resulting in 56 matches. The standings in each pool determined qualification for the final ranking matches.

On 24 August 2026, the top-ranked teams from each pool contested the final to determine the champion, while the second-placed teams competed in the bronze medal match. The remaining teams played classification matches to determine the final rankings from fifth to sixteenth place.

== Venues ==
Following is a list of all venues and host cities across the Netherlands and Belgium.

2026 FIH Para Hockey World Cup is located in Benelux	Netherlands	Belgium
2026 FIH Para Hockey World Cup is located in Benelux	Wagener Stadium	Belfius Hockey Arena
2026 FIH Para Hockey World Cup is located in Benelux	Capacity: 15,000	Capacity: 10,000
2026 FIH Para Hockey World Cup is located in Benelux	Myra Hockey Club	Louvain-la-Neuve Hockey Club
2026 FIH Para Hockey World Cup is located in Benelux	Capacity: 2,500	Capacity: 2,000

== Pool A ==
All times are local (UTC+2).

Pos	Team	Pld	W	D	L	GF	GA	GD	Pts	Qualification
1	Italy	7	7	0	0	57	7	+50	21	Final
2	Belgium (H)	7	6	0	1	48	14	+34	18	Third place match
3	France	7	4	1	2	32	20	+12	13	Classification round
4	Germany	7	4	1	2	29	17	+12	13	Classification round
5	Pakistan	7	3	0	4	35	25	+10	9	Classification round
6	Ireland	7	2	0	5	12	38	−26	6	Classification round
7	United States	7	1	0	6	14	71	−57	3	Classification round
8	Zambia	7	0	0	7	0	35	−35	0	Classification round

Source: FIH
Rules for classification: 1) points; 2) matches won; 3) goal difference; 4) goals for; 5) head-to-head result; 6) field goals scored.
(H) Hosts

20 August 2026
10:00

Belgium	13–1	United States
van den Bergh 2', 26'; Bervoets 4', 21', 22'; Lecat 7', 10', 13' de Groot 8', 12' van Goethem 19'; Lietard 21', 25'	Report	Miller 17'

Louvain-la-Neuve Hockey Club, Louvain-la-Neuve
Umpires:
Michal Pivko (SVK)
Mathieu Pinet (FRA)

20 August 2026
10:15

Italy	12–0	Ireland
Pasquali 2', 3', 4', 17'; Ciccazzo 6', 18', 22'; Buzali 10'; Volpe 15', 15', 24', 29'	Report

Louvain-la-Neuve Hockey Club, Louvain-la-Neuve
Umpires:
Thorsten Steinmetz (GER)
Dirk von Jeetze (GER)

20 August 2026
11:15

Germany	5–0 Forfeit (Note: Team Zambia not present.)	Zambia
	Report

Louvain-la-Neuve Hockey Club, Louvain-la-Neuve
Umpires:
Sylvain Scopelitis (BEL)
Christophe Vekemans (BEL)

20 August 2026
11:30

France	3–2	Pakistan
Gomes 11', 17', 20'	Report	Khan 22', 29'

Louvain-la-Neuve Hockey Club, Louvain-la-Neuve
Umpires:
Julie Moisse (BEL)
Harold Syne (BEL)

20 August 2026
15:00

Italy	5–0 Forfeit	Zambia
	Report

Louvain-la-Neuve Hockey Club, Louvain-la-Neuve
Umpires:
Thorsten Steinmetz (GER)
Michal Pivko (SVK)

20 August 2026
15:00

Belgium	8–1	Ireland
van den Bergh 2'; Bervoets 4', 12'; Lecat 8', 21'; Baltus 15' de Groot 15', 27'	Report	Fortune 30'

Louvain-la-Neuve Hockey Club, Louvain-la-Neuve
Umpires:
Dirk von Jeetze (GER)
Mathieu Pinet (FRA)

20 August 2026
16:15

Germany	3–2	Pakistan
Nguyen 6'; Kleinatland 24', 28'	Report	Khan 8', 18'

Louvain-la-Neuve Hockey Club, Louvain-la-Neuve
Umpires:
Christophe Vekemans (BEL)
Harold Syne (BEL)

20 August 2026
16:15

France	13–1	United States
Gomes 3', 5', 8', 20', 22'; Valentin 9', 25', 27', 28'; Garcia 13', 15'; Campourcy 21', 24'	Report	Jenkins 12'

Louvain-la-Neuve Hockey Club, Louvain-la-Neuve
Umpires:
Julie Moisse (BEL)
Sylvain Scopelitis (BEL)

21 August 2026
10:00

Germany	2–2	France
Nguyen 28'; Kleinatland 30+'	Report	Garcia 12'; Gomes 22'

Louvain-la-Neuve Hockey Club, Louvain-la-Neuve
Umpires:
Sylvain Scopelitis (BEL)
Harold Syne (BEL)

21 August 2026
10:00

Ireland	5–2	United States
Burke 1', 28'; Kiernan 12'; Loftus 14'; Fortune 16'	Report	Weisbrot 23'; Everett 28'

Louvain-la-Neuve Hockey Club, Louvain-la-Neuve
Umpires:
Julie Moisse (BEL)
Michal Pivko (SVK)

21 August 2026
11:15

Belgium	5–0 Forfeit	Zambia
	Report

Louvain-la-Neuve Hockey Club, Louvain-la-Neuve
Umpires:
Mathieu Pinet (FRA)
Dirk von Jeetze (GER)

21 August 2026
11:15

Italy	6–0	Pakistan
Ciccazzo 1', 19'; Buzali 2'; Colasanti 13'; Pasquali 24', 29'	Report

Louvain-la-Neuve Hockey Club, Louvain-la-Neuve
Umpires:
Thorsten Steinmetz (GER)
Christophe Vekemans (BEL)

21 August 2026
15:00

Germany	12–0	United States
Uhrig 1', 15+'; Kleinatland 3', 3', 18'; Lampe 7', 12'; Wiedemann 8'; Bäricke 13'; Stojanovic 21', 22'; Steffen 23'	Report

Louvain-la-Neuve Hockey Club, Louvain-la-Neuve
Umpires:
Harold Syne (BEL)
Mathieu Pinet (FRA)

21 August 2026
15:00

Zambia	0–5 Forfeit	Ireland
	Report

Louvain-la-Neuve Hockey Club, Louvain-la-Neuve
Umpires:
Julie Moisse (BEL)
Michal Pivko (SVK)

21 August 2026
16:15

Italy	8–1	France
Ciccazzo 3', 15', 17'; Buzali 7', 15'; Pasquali 12'; Lecis 26'; Volpe 28'	Report	Gomes 27'

Louvain-la-Neuve Hockey Club, Louvain-la-Neuve
Umpires:
Christophe Vekemans (BEL)
Sylvain Scopelitis (BEL)

21 August 2026
16:15

Belgium	8–1	Pakistan
Bervoets 2', 11', 14'; Roekaerts 9' de Groot 18', 27', 29'; Baltus 26'	Report	Khan 30'

Louvain-la-Neuve Hockey Club, Louvain-la-Neuve
Umpires:
Dirk von Jeetze (GER)
Thorsten Steinmetz (GER)

22 August 2026
10:00

Italy	10–1	United States
Ciccazzo 2', 7'; Buzali 5'; Volpe 7', 17'; Pasquali 9'; Niola 12'; Colasanti 27'; Caso 28', 30'	Report	Everett 13'

Louvain-la-Neuve Hockey Club, Louvain-la-Neuve
Umpires:
Sylvain Scopelitis (BEL)
Julie Moisse (BEL)

22 August 2026
10:00

Belgium	4–3	Germany
Bervoets 4', 9', 20', 30'	Report	Kleinatland 6', 13'; Wiedemann 12'

Louvain-la-Neuve Hockey Club, Louvain-la-Neuve
Umpires:
Mathieu Pinet (FRA)
Michal Pivko (SVK)

22 August 2026
11:15

France	7–0	Ireland
Gomes 3', 6', 14', 19', 20', 30'; Mahiaoui 26'	Report

Louvain-la-Neuve Hockey Club, Louvain-la-Neuve
Umpires:
Thorsten Steinmetz (GER)
Dirk von Jeetze (GER)

22 August 2026
11:15

Pakistan	5–0 Forfeit	Zambia
	Report

Louvain-la-Neuve Hockey Club, Louvain-la-Neuve
Umpires:
Harold Syne (BEL)
Christophe Vekemans (BEL)

22 August 2026
15:00

France	5–0 Forfeit	Zambia
	Report

Louvain-la-Neuve Hockey Club, Louvain-la-Neuve
Umpires:
Harold Syne (BEL)
Julie Moisse (BEL)

22 August 2026
15:00

United States	4–18	Pakistan
Smith 17'; Jenkins 19'; Croy 25'; Everett 30'	Report	Khan 1', 1', 4', 6', 11', 14', 15', 16', 18', 19', 21'; Khan 26', 30'; Hayat 5'; Abbasi 12'; Samad 14', 27'; Rubab 23'

Louvain-la-Neuve Hockey Club, Louvain-la-Neuve
Umpires:
Christophe Vekemans (BEL)
Mathieu Pinet (FRA)

22 August 2026
16:15

Belgium	3–7	Italy
Bervoets 11', 19', 24'	Report	Volpe 3'; Conti 6'; Ciccazzo 9'; Buzali 14', 25', 28'; Pasquali 22'

Louvain-la-Neuve Hockey Club, Louvain-la-Neuve
Umpires:
Dirk von Jeetze (GER)
Michal Pivko (SVK)

22 August 2026
16:15

Germany	2–0	Ireland
Kleinatland 14', 19'	Report

Louvain-la-Neuve Hockey Club, Louvain-la-Neuve
Umpires:
Mathieu Pinet (FRA)
Harold Syne (BEL)

23 August 2026
10:00

Pakistan	7–1	Ireland
Khan 3', 9', 13', 18', 21', 23'; Samad 9'	Report	Loftus 28'

Louvain-la-Neuve Hockey Club, Louvain-la-Neuve
Umpires:
Michal Pivko (SVK)
Harold Syne (BEL)

23 August 2026
10:00

Zambia	0–5 Forfeit	United States
	Report

Louvain-la-Neuve Hockey Club, Louvain-la-Neuve
Umpires:
Sylvain Scopelitis (BEL)
Mathieu Pinet (FRA)

23 August 2026
11:15

Italy	9–2	Germany
Buzali 5'; Ciccazzo 6', 17', 19', 23'; Pasquali 6', 10', 26'; Volpe 23'	Report	Nguyen 21'; Kleinatland 28'

Louvain-la-Neuve Hockey Club, Louvain-la-Neuve
Umpires:
Christophe Vekemans (BEL)
Julie Moisse (BEL)

23 August 2026
11:15

Belgium	7–1	France
Lecat 1', 4', 25'; Bervoets 7', 18'; Baltus 15+' de Groot 28'	Report	Valentin 17'

Louvain-la-Neuve Hockey Club, Louvain-la-Neuve
Umpires:
Thorsten Steinmetz (GER)
Dirk von Jeetze (GER)

== Pool B ==
All times are local (UTC+2).

Pos	Team	Pld	W	D	L	GF	GA	GD	Pts	Qualification
1	Spain	7	7	0	0	34	9	+25	21	Final
2	Malaysia	7	5	1	1	27	11	+16	16	Third place match
3	Bulgaria	7	5	0	2	35	14	+21	15	Classification round
4	Netherlands (H)	7	4	1	2	37	10	+27	13	Classification round
5	England	7	3	0	4	24	30	−6	9	Classification round
6	India	7	2	0	5	26	31	−5	6	Classification round
7	Argentina	7	1	0	6	7	34	−27	3	Classification round
8	Chile	7	0	0	7	7	58	−51	0	Classification round

Source: FIH
Rules for classification: 1) points; 2) matches won; 3) goal difference; 4) goals for; 5) head-to-head result; 6) field goals scored.
(H) Hosts

20 August 2026
10:00

Netherlands	6–0	Argentina
Robertson 2'; Voss 5'; Wieringa 13'; Gosselink 21'; Dijkstra 26', 27'	Report

Myra Hockey Club, Amstelveen
Umpires:
Fiona Weissert (GER)
Maxwell Davidson (ENG)

20 August 2026
10:15

Spain	10–1	Chile
Campabadal 3', 8', 19', 21'; Galindo 4'; Salmeron 5'; Garcia 11', 20'; Rodriguez 21'; Markina 22'	Report	Heyl 12'

Myra Hockey Club, Amstelveen
Umpires:
Sandra Wagner (GER)
Berry van Bentum (NED)

20 August 2026
11:15

Bulgaria	2–4	Malaysia
Angel 18', 19'	Report	Muhammad-Rafiq 4', 13'; Lourdess-Raj 8'; Muhammad-Airiel-Mikail 10'

Myra Hockey Club, Amstelveen
Umpires:
Sven van den Hoek (NED)
Job Baan (NED)

20 August 2026
11:30

England	6–3	India
Crosse 1', 9', 13'; Davey 8', 23'; Graham 24'	Report	Rajpura 10', 16', 17'

Myra Hockey Club, Amstelveen
Umpires:
Patrick Liethof (NED)
Ales Vetrovsky (CZE)

20 August 2026
15:00

Netherlands	16–0	Chile
Wieringa 3', 7'; Dijkstra 5', 26'; Esser 11', 11', 15+', 23', 23'; Walraven 12'; Gosselink 17', 19', 21', 22'; Robertson 27'; Laan 29'	Report

Myra Hockey Club, Amstelveen
Umpires:
Sandra Wagner (GER)
Ales Vetrovsky (CZE)

20 August 2026
15:00

Spain	4–2	Malaysia
Campabadal 6', 20', 25'; Galindo 17'	Report	Lourdess-Raj 7'; Muhammad-Rafiq 11'

Myra Hockey Club, Amstelveen
Umpires:
Patrick Liethof (NED)
Maxwell Davidson (ENG)

20 August 2026
16:15

Bulgaria	7–2	India
Angel 2', 12', 14', 16', 18', 22', 23'	Report	Rajpura 9', 19'

Myra Hockey Club, Amstelveen
Umpires:
Fiona Weissert (GER)
Job Baan (NED)

20 August 2026
16:15

England	4–1	Argentina
Crosse 4', 10', 15'; Mullan 16'	Report	Rios 11'

Myra Hockey Club, Amstelveen
Umpires:
Sven van den Hoek (NED)
Berry van Bentum (NED)

21 August 2026
10:00

Bulgaria	5–3	England
Simeonov 3', 25'; Angel 14', 16', 21'	Report	Davey 11'; Crosse 13'; Shaw 27'

Myra Hockey Club, Amstelveen
Umpires:
Sven van den Hoek (NED)
Sandra Wagner (GER)

21 August 2026
10:00

Chile	1–3	Argentina
Soto 12'	Report	Brocal 9'; Figueroa 15'; Geuna 22'

Myra Hockey Club, Amstelveen
Umpires:
Fiona Weissert (GER)
Job Baan (NED)

21 August 2026
11:15

Netherlands	2–2	Malaysia
Esser 16'; Voss 18'	Report	Muhammad-Rafiq 2', 24'

Myra Hockey Club, Amstelveen
Umpires:
Maxwell Davidson (ENG)
Ales Vetrovsky (CZE)

21 August 2026
11:15

Spain	5–2	India
Salmeron 6'; Campabadal 11', 20'; Lachica 13'; Galindo 25'	Report	Rajpura 18', 26'

Myra Hockey Club, Amstelveen
Umpires:
Patrick Liethof (NED)
Berry van Bentum (NED)

21 August 2026
15:00

Bulgaria	8–1	Argentina
Simeonov 2'; Angel 5', 6', 18', 28'; Svetoslav 7', 20', 27'	Report	Figueroa 29'

Myra Hockey Club, Amstelveen
Umpires:
Maxwell Davidson (ENG)
Sandra Wagner (GER)

21 August 2026
15:00

Malaysia	3–0	Chile
Muhammad-Airiel-Mikail 4', 7'; Emily-Min-Qi 14'	Report

Myra Hockey Club, Amstelveen
Umpires:
Sven van den Hoek (NED)
Patrick Liethof (NED)

21 August 2026
16:15

Spain	6–2	England
Campabadal 1'; Markina 4', 13'; Galindo 9', 30'; Lachica 22'	Report	Crosse 14', 29'

Myra Hockey Club, Amstelveen
Umpires:
Job Baan (NED)
Berry van Bentum (NED)

21 August 2026
16:15

Netherlands	5–0	India
Gosselink 10', 14'; Laan 17'; Robertson 23'; Esser 25'	Report

Myra Hockey Club, Amstelveen
Umpires:
Fiona Weissert (GER)
Ales Vetrovsky (CZE)

22 August 2026
10:00

Spain	4–1	Argentina
Galindo 2'; Campabadal 4', 20', 25'	Report	Geuna 9'

Myra Hockey Club, Amstelveen
Umpires:
Patrick Liethof (NED)
Sandra Wagner (GER)

22 August 2026
10:00

Netherlands	1–2	Bulgaria
Esser 20'	Report	Angel 17', 18'

Myra Hockey Club, Amstelveen
Umpires:
Maxwell Davidson (ENG)
Ales Vetrovsky (CZE)

22 August 2026
11:15

England	7–3	Chile
Graham 6'; Wood 13', 23'; Davey 16', 17'; Shaw 18'; Crosse 25'	Report	Soto 5'; Hernandez 26'; Drago 29'

Myra Hockey Club, Amstelveen
Umpires:
Berry van Bentum (NED)
Fiona Weissert (GER)

22 August 2026
11:15

India	2–7	Malaysia
Jivan 4'; Biju 13'	Report	Lourdess-Raj 1', 9', 12', 19', 22', 27'; Muhammad-Rafiq 23'

Myra Hockey Club, Amstelveen
Umpires:
Sven van den Hoek (NED)
Job Baan (NED)

22 August 2026
15:00

England	0–5	Malaysia
	Report	Muhammad-Rafiq 1', 15', 20'; Lourdess-Raj 6', 9'

Myra Hockey Club, Amstelveen
Umpires:
Ales Vetrovsky (CZE)
Fiona Weissert (GER)

22 August 2026
15:00

Argentina	0–7	India
	Report	Rajpura 5', 6', 9', 14', 30'; Biju 24', 25'

Myra Hockey Club, Amstelveen
Umpires:
Sven van den Hoek (NED)
Berry van Bentum (NED)

22 August 2026
16:15

Netherlands	0–4	Spain
	Report	Campabadal 10', 11', 14'; Galindo 12'

Myra Hockey Club, Amstelveen
Umpires:
Maxwell Davidson (ENG)
Sandra Wagner (GER)

22 August 2026
16:15

Bulgaria	10–1	Chile
Angel 4', 5', 12', 14', 16', 17', 30+'; Svetoslav 11'; Marin 28'; Martinov 29'	Report	Soto 20'

Myra Hockey Club, Amstelveen
Umpires:
Job Baan (NED)
Patrick Liethof (NED)

23 August 2026
10:00

India	10–1	Chile
Rajpura 6', 11', 17', 17'; Biju 9', 29'; Jivan 12', 14', 20', 24'	Report	Hernandez 25'

Myra Hockey Club, Amstelveen
Umpires:
Ales Vetrovsky (CZE)
Maxwell Davidson (ENG)

23 August 2026
10:00

Malaysia	4–1	Argentina
Muhammad-Rafiq 1', 6'; Lourdess-Raj 13'; Mohamad-Safirul 19'	Report	Geuna 24'

Myra Hockey Club, Amstelveen
Umpires:
Sven van den Hoek (NED)
Patrick Liethof (NED)

23 August 2026
11:15

Spain	2–1	Bulgaria
Campabadal 14', 25'	Report	Angel 3'

Myra Hockey Club, Amstelveen
Umpires:
Berry van Bentum (NED)
Job Baan (NED)

23 August 2026
11:15

Netherlands	7–2	England
Esser 1'; Voss 9', 19'; Gosselink 13', 14', 15'; Wieringa 29'	Report	Crosse 24'; Shaw 29'

Myra Hockey Club, Amstelveen
Umpires:
Fiona Weissert (GER)
Sandra Wagner (GER)

== Classification round ==
=== Thirteenth to sixteenth place ===
24 August 2026
11:25

Argentina	1–1	Chile
Rios 12'	Report	Soto 19'

Wagener Stadium, Amstelveen
Umpires:
Job Baan (NED)
Maxwell Davidson (ENG)

24 August 2026
12:55

United States	5–0 Forfeit	Zambia
Everett 2', 25'; Croy 8'; Weisbrot 17'	Report	Tembo 5', 6', 10', 14', 18', 20', 23'; Lubinda 25', 25'

Belfius Hockey Arena, Wavre
Umpires:
Thorsten Steinmetz (GER)
Sylvain Scopelitis (BEL)

=== Ninth to twelfth place ===
24 August 2026
11:25

England	2–2	India
Shaw 20', 24'	Report	Biju 11'; Rajpura 23'

Wagener Stadium, Amstelveen
Umpires:
Patrick Liethof (NED)
Sven van den Hoek (NED)

24 August 2026
12:55

Pakistan	8–1	Ireland
Khan 5', 6', 13', 14', 20'; Samad 16', 17', 21'	Report	Burke 3'

Belfius Hockey Arena, Wavre
Umpires:
Mathieu Pinet (FRA)
Christophe Vekemans (BEL)

=== Fifth to eighth place ===
24 August 2026
16:55

Bulgaria	5–2	Netherlands
Angel 3', 7', 15', 19', 20'	Report	Laan 5'; Voss 29'

Wagener Stadium, Amstelveen
Umpires:
Sandra Wagner (GER)
Ales Vetrovsky (CZE)

24 August 2026
19:05

Germany	5–2	France
Kleinatland 3', 17'; Nguyen 10', 22'; Wiedemann 27'	Report	Valentin 6'; Gomes 15'

Belfius Hockey Arena, Wavre
Umpires:
Julie Moisse (BEL)
Harold Syne (BEL)

== Third place match ==
24 August 2026
16:55

Malaysia	3–1	Belgium
Lourdess-Raj 16'; Muhammad-Rafiq 19'; Annur-Qisya-Haziqah 28'	Report	Bervoets 6'

Wagener Stadium, Amstelveen
Umpires:
Berry van Bentum (NED)
Fiona Weissert (GER)

== Final ==
24 August 2026
19:05

Italy	5–4	Spain
Conti 3'; Buzali 12', 29'; Volpe 14', 22'	Report	Campabadal 4', 20', 25', 30+'

Belfius Hockey Arena, Wavre
Umpires:
Michal Pivko (SVK)
Dirk von Jeetze (GER)

== Final ranking ==
Pos	Grp	Team	Pld	W	D	L	GF	GA	GD	Pts	Final result
1	A	Italy	8	8	0	0	62	11	+51	24	Gold medal
2	B	Spain	8	7	0	1	38	14	+24	21	Silver medal
3	B	Malaysia	8	6	1	1	30	12	+18	19	Bronze medal
4	A	Belgium	8	6	0	2	49	17	+32	18	Fourth place
5	B	Bulgaria	8	6	0	2	40	16	+24	18	Fifth place
6	A	Germany	8	5	1	2	34	19	+15	16	Fifth place
7	A	France	8	4	1	3	34	25	+9	13	Seventh place
8	B	Netherlands	8	4	1	3	39	15	+24	13	Seventh place
9	B	England	8	3	1	4	26	32	−6	10	Ninth place
10	A	Pakistan	8	4	0	4	43	26	+17	12	Ninth place
11	B	India	8	2	1	5	28	33	−5	7	Eleventh place
12	A	Ireland	8	2	0	6	13	46	−33	6	Eleventh place
13	B	Argentina	8	1	1	6	8	35	−27	4	Thirteenth place
14	A	United States	8	2	0	6	19	71	−52	6	Thirteenth place
15	B	Chile	8	0	1	7	8	59	−51	1	Fifteenth place
16	A	Zambia	8	0	0	8	0	40	−40	0	Fifteenth place

Source: FIH

== Goalscorers ==
There were 444 goals scored in 64 matches, for an average of 6.94 goals per match.

Rank	Player	Goals
1	(Bulgaria) Hilendarov Angel	31
2	(Pakistan) Abdul Khan	29
3	(Belgium) Stijn Bervoets	18
4	(India) Taslimbhai Rajpura	17
4	(Spain) Marc Campabadal	17
6	(France) Dominique Gomes	16
7	(Italy) Simone Ciccazzo	15
8	(Italy) Andrea Pasquali	12
8	(Malaysia) Philip_John Lourdess-Raj	12
8	(Malaysia) Abdullah Muhammad-Rafiq	12
11	(England) Robert Crosse	11
11	(Germany) Jan Kleinatland	11
13	(Netherlands) Fabian Gosselink	10
14	(Italy) Endri Buzali	9
14	(Italy) Anja Volpe	9
14	(Netherlands) Ralph Esser	9
17	(Belgium) Daniel de Groot	8
17	(Belgium) Tom Lecat	8
19	(Spain) Carlos Galindo	7
19	(Zambia) Sibusiso Tembo	7
21	(India) Suraj Biju	6
21	(Pakistan) Abdul Samad	6
21	(United States) Jessica Everett	6
24	(England) Joel Davey	5
24	(England) Thomas Shaw	5
24	(France) Shanael Valentin	5
24	(India) Jivan	5
24	(Netherlands) Jeroen Voss	5
29	(Bulgaria) Ventsislavov Svetoslav	4
29	(Chile) Martín Soto	4
29	(Netherlands) Louise Dijkstra	4
29	(Netherlands) Mees Wieringa	4
33	(Argentina) Simón Geuna	3
33	(Belgium) Amco Baltus	3
33	(Belgium) Natalia van den Bergh	3
33	(Bulgaria) Nikolay Simeonov	3
33	(France) Kelian Garcia	3
33	(Germany) Johnny Nguyen	3
33	(Ireland) Matthew Burke	3
33	(Malaysia) Zulkefli Muhammad-Airiel-Mikail	3
33	(Netherlands) Avalon Laan	3
33	(Netherlands) Rosalie Robertson	3
33	(Spain) Paula Markina	3
44	(Argentina) Julien Figueroa	2
44	(Argentina) Pablo Rios	2
44	(Belgium) Zoé Lietard	2
44	(Chile) Mateo Hernandez	2
44	(England) Oliver Graham	2
44	(England) Sophie Wood	2
44	(France) Batiste Campourcy	2
44	(Germany) Patrick-Angelo Lampe	2
44	(Germany) Yannick Stojanovic	2
44	(Germany) Smilla Uhrig	2
44	(Germany) Dennis Wiedemann	2
44	(Ireland) Daniel Fortune	2
44	(Ireland) Aoife Loftus	2
44	(Italy) Annamaria Caso	2
44	(Italy) Flavio Colasanti	2
44	(Spain) Rebeca Garcia	2
44	(Spain) Alex Lachica	2
44	(Spain) Jose Salmeron	2
44	(United States) Noah Croy	2
44	(United States) Braden Jenkins	2
44	(United States) Scott Weisbrot	2
44	(Zambia) Michael Lubinda	2
66	(Argentina) Nicolas Brocal	1
66	(Belgium) Robbe Roekaerts	1
66	(Belgium) Paulien van Goethem	1
66	(Bulgaria) Kavanozov Marin	1
66	(Bulgaria) Presiyan Martinov	1
66	(Chile) Rolando Drago	1
66	(Chile) Thomas Heyl	1
66	(England) Alison Mullan	1
66	(France) Lahcen Mahiaoui	1
66	(Germany) Josefine Bäricke	1
66	(Germany) Marcus Steffen	1
66	(Ireland) Niamh Kiernan	1
66	(Italy) Cristian Conti	1
66	(Italy) Marco Lecis	1
66	(Italy) Maria Niola	1
66	(Malaysia) Mohd_Anuar Annur-Qisya-Haziqah	1
66	(Malaysia) Tiong Emily-Min-Qi	1
66	(Malaysia) Mohd_Sapri Mohamad-Safirul	1
66	(Netherlands) Simon Walraven	1
66	(Pakistan) Fiza Abbasi	1
66	(Pakistan) Shah Hayat	1
66	(Pakistan) Syeda Rubab	1
66	(Spain) Cristian Rodriguez	1
66	(United States) Nathan Miller	1

Source:FIH
