= Para hockey =

Adapted forms of field hockey

- Highest governing body: International Hockey Federation (FIH)

Characteristics
- Contact: Limited
- Team members: 6 players per side (5 field players and 1 goalkeeper; Hockey ID)
- Type: Team sport
- Equipment: Hockey stick, hockey ball, shin guards, mouthguard, goalkeeper protective equipment
- Venue: Outdoor (Hockey ID); other para disciplines may be indoor or outdoor

Presence
- World Championships: FIH Para Hockey World Cup (since 2026)
- Paralympic: No

Para hockey is the collective term used by the FIH for adapted forms of field hockey played by athletes with disabilities. It encompasses several disciplines, including Hockey ID for athletes with intellectual disabilities, as well as developing formats such as wheelchair hockey and hockey for athletes with physical disabilities. Para hockey is governed internationally by the FIH in collaboration with organizations including Special Olympics, continental and national hockey federations.

The FIH has supported the international development of Para hockey through coach education, regional championships, and development programmes. In 2026, the sport reached a significant milestone with the inauguration of the FIH Para Hockey World Cup, the first official world championship for Hockey ID.

== Rules ==
As an umbrella term for adapted forms of field hockey played by athletes with disabilities, the rules of Para hockey vary according to the discipline. The FIH has published official rules for Hockey ID, the discipline for athletes with intellectual disabilities, while other para hockey disciplines, including wheelchair hockey, are governed by separate regulations.

Hockey ID retains the fundamental objective and principles of field hockey, with modifications intended to make the game more accessible while preserving its competitive nature. Teams compete to score goals by legally playing the ball into the opposing team's goal, and matches are officiated by umpires in accordance with the FIH rules.

=== Playing area ===
Hockey ID is played on a rectangular field measuring up to 55 metres long and 43 metres wide, corresponding to half of a standard outdoor hockey pitch. The field is marked with side-lines, back-lines, a centre spot, shooting circles and penalty spots. Goals are positioned centrally on each back-line and are the same dimensions as those used in standard field hockey.

=== Teams and equipment ===
Each team consists of a maximum of six players on the field at one time, including one goalkeeper. Teams may name up to four substitutes, with unlimited rolling substitutions permitted except during the taking of a shoot-out. Goalkeepers are required to wear full protective equipment, including a helmet, body protection, leg guards, kickers and hand protectors, while field players use standard hockey sticks and balls and are recommended to wear shin guards and mouthguards.

=== Match format ===
A match consists of two 15-minute halves separated by a 5-minute half-time interval. The team scoring the greater number of goals wins the match, while drawn matches remain tied unless tournament regulations require a shoot-out competition to determine the winner.

=== Gameplay ===
Play begins with a centre pass and teams change ends at half-time. Players may move the ball by pushing, hitting, flicking or scooping it with the flat side of the stick. A goal is scored only when the ball is played by an attacker from inside the shooting circle before completely crossing the goal line beneath the crossbar.

Field players may not play the ball with the rounded side of the stick or intentionally use their feet or body to gain an advantage. Dangerous play, obstruction, reckless tackling and intentionally raising the ball from a hit, except during a shot at goal, are prohibited. Goalkeepers may use their body and protective equipment to play the ball inside their own circle but may only use their stick outside it.

=== Officials and penalties ===
Matches are controlled by two umpires responsible for enforcing the rules, recording goals and disciplinary sanctions, and ensuring fair play. Most infringements result in a free hit, while defensive offences inside the circle may result in a shoot-out or, if a probable goal has been prevented, a penalty stroke.

Players may receive personal penalties in the form of a green card, resulting in a one-minute suspension; a yellow card, resulting in a temporary suspension of at least two minutes; or a red card, resulting in permanent dismissal from the match. During green- and yellow-card suspensions, the offending team plays with one fewer player.

== History ==
=== Development ===
Adapted forms of field hockey for athletes with disabilities have been played for many years through national hockey associations and disability sport organisations. Hockey for athletes with intellectual disabilities (Hockey ID) developed primarily through grassroots initiatives, but lacked consistent international governance, competition structures and classification systems during its early development.

A qualitative study published in 2026 identified significant barriers to the sport's international development, including inconsistent competition opportunities, limited awareness among national hockey federations and the absence of a coordinated international strategy. The study recommended that the International Hockey Federation (FIH) develop a collaborative framework involving disability sport organisations, national associations and athletes to establish governance, increase participation and promote international competition.

=== International recognition ===
In 2016, the FIH signed a long-term partnership with INAS to develop Para hockey for people with intellectual disabilities, including programmes to expand participation worldwide and a global audit of participation. Working with organisations including Special Olympics, its continental and national member associations, the FIH introduced coaching resources, educational programmes and regional competitions to expand participation for athletes with disabilities. These initiatives formed part of a broader strategy to establish internationally recognised pathways for Para hockey.

=== FIH governance ===
The FIH introduced the first standalone Rules of Para Hockey for Athletes with an Intellectual Disability (Hockey ID), which came into effect on 1 June 2026. The rules formally defined Para hockey as the umbrella term for all forms of hockey played by athletes with disabilities, including Hockey ID (intellectual disability), Hockey PD (physical disability) and Hockey WD (wheelchair hockey). The publication also established Hockey ID as the internationally governed discipline for FIH competitions.

=== First FIH Para Hockey World Cup ===
In October 2025, the FIH announced the creation of the inaugural FIH Para Hockey World Cup, to be held alongside the 2026 Men's and Women's Hockey World Cups in Belgium and the Netherlands. The 2026 tournament, that was contested in the Hockey ID format, represented the first official world championship, organised by the FIH for Para hockey and marked a significant milestone in the sport's international development.

== See also ==
- Field hockey
- International Hockey Federation
- FIH Para Hockey World Cup
