= Special Olympics Bharat =

Special Olympics governing body

- Sport: Special Olympics
- Jurisdiction: India
- Founded: 1988
- President: Dr. Mallika Nadda
- Vice president: Pawan Kumar Patodia

Official website
- specialolympicsbharat.org
- (India)

Special Olympics Bharat is an officially recognised programme of Special Olympics International which operates in India. It was founded in 1988 as Special Olympics India, and from 2001 it became as Special Olympics Bharat. it is recognized by the government of India as a National Sports Federation for the development of sports opportunity for the people with intellectual disabilities. The special Olympics Bharat programme has so far drawn a number of coaches to work with 850875 athletes across the country. Special Olympics Bharat is a National Sports Federation also registered under the Indian Trust Act 1882 in 2001 and is accredited by Special Olympics International to conduct Special Olympics Programs in India. It is recognized by the Government of India as a National Sports Federation in the Priority Category, for development of Sports for Persons with Intellectual Disabilities, and is a designated Nodal Agency for all disabilities on account of its national presence and experience, especially in rural areas which account for nearly 75 per cent of the disabled population in India.

== Oath ==
"Let me win.I have to win but if I cannot win, let me be brave in the attempt."

== India at the Special Olympics World Games ==
A total of 885 Special Olympics Bharat athletes have participated in eight World Summer Games and five World Winter Games between 1987 and 2015.They have won 322 gold, 343 silver and 397 bronze medals in the world summer and world winter games bringing a combined count to 1062 Medals.

=== Summer Games ===
743 Athletes have participated at the Special Olympics World Summer Games since 1987 until 2015. Through participation across 8 World Summer Games they have won 286 Gold, 304 Silver and 378 Bronze Medals to an overall tally of 968.

214 athletes and 53 coaches participated at the Special Olympics World Summer games held in Los Angeles, California, US, from 25 July to 2 August 2015, across 14 sport disciplines: athletics, aquatics, bocce, basketball, badminton, table tennis, volleyball, softball, football, powerlifting, roller skating, handball, cycling, and Unified golf.

=== Winter Games ===
142 Athletes have participated at the Special Olympics World Winter Games since 1993 until 2013. Through participation across 5 Special Olympics World Winter Games and 19 Bronze Medals to an overall tally of 94.
