= Luis Calzado =

Spanish field hockey player (born 2000)

Personal information
- Full name: Luis Calzado Basso
- Born: 15 November 2000 (age 25) Barcelona, Spain

Sport
- Sport: Field hockey
- Position: Goalkeeper
- Club: Kampong
Youth career
- Years: Team
- 2005–2018: Real Club de Polo
Senior career
| Years | Team | Caps | Goals |
| 2018–2025 | Real Club de Polo | - | - |
| 2025–present | Kampong | - | - |
National team
| Years | Team | Caps | Goals |
| 2019–2021 | Spain U21 | 6 | (0) |
| 2022–present | Spain | 84 | (0) |
Medal record
Men's field hockey
Representing Spain
FIH Hockey World Cup
| Silver medal – second place | 2026 Wavre–Amstelveen |
EuroHockey Championship
| Bronze medal – third place | 2025 Mönchengladbach |

Luis Calzado Basso (Note: In this Spanish name, the first or paternal surname is Calzado and the second or maternal family name is Basso.) (born 15 November 2000) is a Spanish field hockey player who plays as a goalkeeper for Dutch Hoofdklasse club Kampong and the Spanish national team. He represented Spain at the 2024 Summer Olympics.

== Club career ==
Calzado played for Real Club de Polo for 20 years and in the first team for 7 years before moving to the Netherlands to play for SV Kampong in 2025. In his first season with Kampong he won the Euro Hockey League.

== Honours ==
=== Club ===
Real Club de Polo

- División de Honor: 2024–25
- Copa del Rey: 2019–20, 2023–24

Kampong

- Euro Hockey League: 2025–26

=== Individual ===
- FIH Hockey Olympic Qualifiers Goalkeeper of the Tournament: 2024
- FIH Hockey World Cup Goalkeeper of the Tournament: 2026
- FIH Goalkeeper of the Year: 2026
