= United States national para hockey team =

The United States Para field hockey team was created in early 2026, after the International Hockey Federation (FIH) invited the US to participate in the first ever Para Hockey World Cup, taking place from August 20 to 24 in Belgium and the Netherlands.

USA field hockey and Field hockey AllStarz are supporting the team. The official sponsor is eVero, a software solutions company. The team trained in St. Louis, Missouri on August 8 and 9, and held their jersey ceremony at Maryville University.

The official roster of players and coaches were announced on August 3, 2026, and currently includes 8 players and two head coaches. The current roster includes:

- Katie Costello: from Mechanichsburg, PA, plays for the PA Revs.
- Noah Croy: from Los Angeles, CA, plays for Bulldogs FHC.
- Jessi Evertt: from Saline, MI, plays for the USA Field Hockey All Starz.
- Braden Jenkins: from Fairview, TN. Was awarded Tennesse's Special Olympics 2026 Athlete of the Year, and plays goalie for the Nashville SC Special Olympics Unified Team.
- Nate Miller: from Hershey, PA, plays for the PA Revs.
- Madisun Roiser: from Spring Hill, TN. Earned a gold medal in the 500-meter short track speed skating in the 2025 Special Olympics World Winter Games in Italy.
- Aiden Smith: from Arlington VA, plays for Beyond Sticks.
- Scott Weisbrot: from Merrick, NY, plays for the Long Island All Starz.

The two head coaches are Lindsay Jackson and Heidi Lewis. Jackson previously coached at the College of the Holy Cross from 2015 to 2025. Lewis is the owner and director of Beyond Sticks field hockey club in Maryland, and previously coached the Catholic University of America field hockey team from 2016 to 2020. Sara Goings is the assistant coach, Laura Jones is team manager, and Meghan Mahoney will be physical trainer.

Team USA plays their first game against Belgium on August 20, 2026.
