= 2026 Men's FIH Hockey World Cup =

Ongoing field hockey competition

Coupe du monde masculine de hockey sur gazon 2026 Wereldkampioenschap hockey voor mannen 2026
- Together for glory

Tournament details
- Host countries: Belgium; Netherlands
- Cities: Wavre; Amstelveen
- Dates: 15–30 August
- Teams: 16 (from 5 confederations)
- Venue(s): Belfius Hockey Arena; Wagener Stadium

Final positions
- Champions: Germany (4th title)
- Runner-up: Spain
- Third place: Argentina

Tournament statistics
- Matches played: 50
- Goals scored: 248 (4.96 per match)
- Top scorer: (Argentina) Tomás Domene (10 goals)
- Best player: (Argentina) Tomás Domene
- Best young player: (Germany) Justus Warweg
- Best goalkeeper: (Spain) Luis Calzado
All statistics are correct as of 30 August 2026


The 2026 Men's FIH Hockey World Cup was the 16th edition of the Men's FIH Hockey World Cup, the quadrennial world championship for men's national field hockey teams organized by the International Hockey Federation. It was held from 15 to 30 August 2026 in Wavre, Belgium and Amsterdam, Netherlands.

Belgium and Netherlands were given the hosting rights in November 2022, beating a joint bid from England and Wales as well as a South African bid. It was the first time the men's event was co-hosted. This also marked Belgium's first and Netherlands' fourth time hosting. It was also the first time the men's and women's world cup were held as one joint tournament.

16 teams participated, for the third time after the expansion in 2018. Qualification was an amalgamation of the FIH Pro League, continental championships and the World Cup Qualifiers. Qualification took place from December 2023 to March 2026.

Germany were the defending champions, having defeated Belgium 5–4 in a shootout after the match finished 3–3 in regular time in Bhubaneswar. They defended their title after defeating Spain in the final by 1–0 and lifted their fourth title.

Argentina-Netherlands at the 2026 Men’s FIH Hockey World Cup, played at Wagener Stadium, Amstelveen, the Netherlands, on August 18th 2026.

== Host selection ==
The International Hockey Federation announced on 15 June 2022 that they had received the following five bids for the 2026 World Cup:

=== For only men's event ===
- England (in partnership with Wales)
- Germany (withdrew)
- South Africa

=== For combined men's and women's event ===
- Belgium and the Netherlands
- South Africa

Wavre, Belgium and Amsterdam, Netherlands were awarded the hosting rights on 3 November 2022.

== Teams ==
=== Qualification ===
Just as in 2018 and 2023, 16 teams competed in the tournament. Alongside hosts, Belgium and Netherlands, the top-ranked teams in the 2023–24 and 2024–25 seasons in the FIH Pro League and the five continental champions received an automatic berth. Then 16 teams from all over the five continents competed for the last seven places at the World Cup Qualifiers. Of the team who qualified, 14 had taken part in the previous edition.

Returners

- Ireland and Pakistan qualified after missing out in 2023.

Absentees

- Chile and South Korea did not advance, after making sporadic appearances in 2023.

The highest ranked team not to qualify was Scotland, ranked 17th, while the lowest ranked team to qualify was Japan, ranked 16th.

List of qualifiers
Dates	Event	Location	Quotas	Qualifier(s)
3 November 2022	Hosts	—N/a	2	Belgium; Netherlands
6 December 2023 – 30 June 2024	2023–24 FIH Pro League	—N/a	1	Australia
30 November 2024 – 29 June 2025	2024–25 FIH Pro League	—N/a	1	Spain
24 July – 3 August 2025	2025 Pan American Cup	Montevideo, Uruguay	1	Argentina
8–16 August 2025	2025 EuroHockey Championship	Mönchengladbach, Germany	1	Germany
29 August – 7 September 2025	2025 Asia Cup	Rajgir, India	1	India
4–7 September 2025	2025 Oceania Cup	Darwin, Australia	1	New Zealand
11–18 October 2025	2025 Africa Cup of Nations	Ismailia, Egypt	1	South Africa
1–7 March 2026	2026 World Cup Qualifiers	Ismailia, Egypt	4	England; Japan; Malaysia; Pakistan
1–8 March 2026	2026 World Cup Qualifiers	Santiago, Chile	3	France; Ireland; Wales
Total			16	

=== Summary of qualified teams ===
Team	Qualification method	Date of qualification	Appearance(s)				Previous best performance (Note: Bold text indicates they hosted that edition.)	WR (Note: World ranking at start of tournament)
Team	Qualification method	Date of qualification	Total	First	Last	Streak	Previous best performance	WR
Belgium	Co-hosts	3 November 2022	8th	1973	2023	4	Champions (2018)	1
Netherlands	Co-hosts	3 November 2022	16th	1971	2023	16	Champions (1973, 1990, 1998)	2
Australia	2023–24 FIH Pro League	23 June 2024	15th	1971	2023	14	Champions (1986, 2010, 2014)	4
Spain	2024–25 FIH Pro League	29 June 2025	16th	1971	2023	16	Runners-up (1971, 1998)	6
Argentina	2025 Pan American Cup	3 August 2025	15th	1971	2023	7	Third place (2014)	7
Germany	2025 EuroHockey Championship	14 August 2025	16th	1971	2023	16	Champions (2002, 2006, 2023)	5
India	2025 Asia Cup	7 September 2025	16th	1971	2023	16	Champions (1975)	8
New Zealand	2025 Oceania Cup	7 September 2025	12th	1971	2023	8	Seventh place (1973, 1975, 1982, 2014, 2023)	11
South Africa	2025 Africa Cup of Nations	18 October 2025	8th	1994	2023	7	Tenth place (1994, 2010)	13
England	2026 World Cup Qualifiers	6 March 2026	15th	1973	2023	15	Runners-up (1986)	3
Pakistan	2026 World Cup Qualifiers	6 March 2026	14th	1971	2018	1	Champions (1971, 1978, 1982, 1994)	12
France	2026 World Cup Qualifiers	6 March 2026	5th	1971	2023	3	Seventh place (1971, 1990)	9
Ireland	2026 World Cup Qualifiers	6 March 2026	4th	1978	2018	1	Twelfth place (1978, 1990)	10
Japan	2026 World Cup Qualifiers	7 March 2026	6th	1971	2023	2	Ninth place (1971, 2006)	16
Malaysia	2026 World Cup Qualifiers	7 March 2026	10th	1973	2023	4	Fourth place (1975)	14
Wales	2026 World Cup Qualifiers	8 March 2026	2nd	2023		2	Eleventh place (2023)	15

== Venues ==
The Belfius Hockey Arena in Wavre was renovated during the preparations for the tournament. The venue was completed in early 2026 and has a 4,000 capacity that was expanded to 10,000 for the tournament. The Wagener Stadium in Amstelveen is 8,000 but was also expanded to 10,000 for the event.

(Netherlands) Amstelveen	2026 Men's FIH Hockey World Cup is located in Benelux	(Belgium) Wavre
Wagener Stadium	2026 Men's FIH Hockey World Cup is located in Benelux	Belfius Hockey Arena
Capacity: 10,000	2026 Men's FIH Hockey World Cup is located in Benelux	Capacity: 10,000

== Draw ==
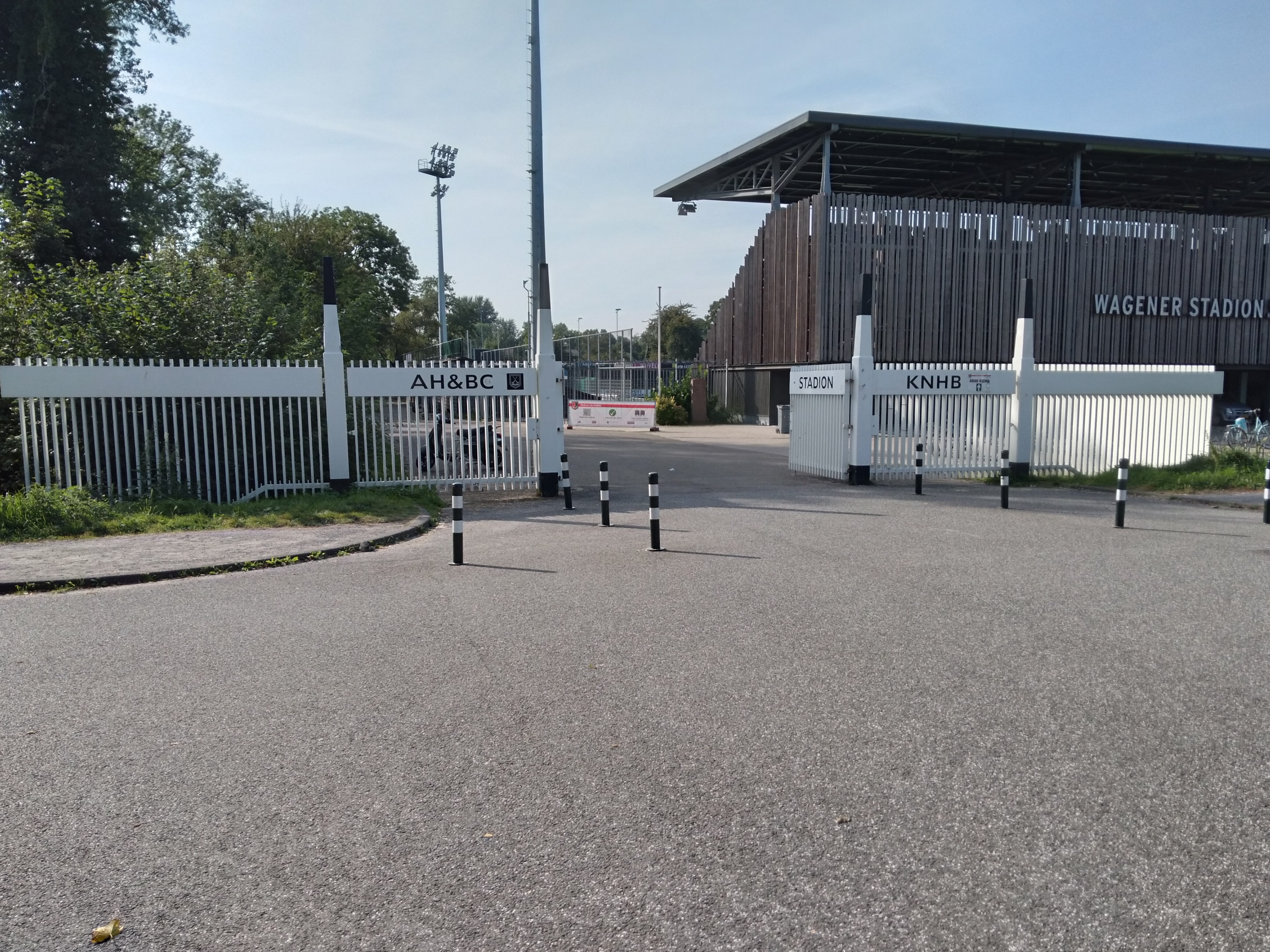
The Wagener Stadium in Amstelveen hosted the draw.

The final draw took place at 15:00 CET on 17 March 2026 at the Wagener Stadium in Amstelveen, Netherlands. Model and presenter, Joyce Colfs, hosted the draw. Field Hockey players, Naomi van As, Barbara Nelen and Teun de Nooijer, alongside Dutch rapper La Fuente, were the guests who assisted the draw. The draw started with the co-hosts being placed into their respective groups held in their country, as well as the two remaining pot 1 teams, Australia and England, being pre-drawn into groups C and D respectively. The draw continued with, in order, pots 4, 3 and 2 being drawn, with each team selected then allocated into the first available group alphabetically. There were no restrictions.

- 2026 Men's FIH Hockey World Cup – Draw
- Draw Live Stream (log in required)

=== Seeding ===
Allocation to pots
Pot 1	Pot 2	Pot 3	Pot 4
Netherlands (H)	Argentina	Ireland	South Africa
Belgium (H)	Germany	France	Japan
Australia	Spain	New Zealand	Malaysia
England	India	Pakistan	Wales

=== Draw ===
Group A in the Netherlands
Pos	Team
A1	Netherlands (H)
A2	Argentina
A3	New Zealand
A4	Japan

Group B in Belgium
Pos	Team
B1	Belgium (H)
B2	Germany
B3	France
B4	Malaysia

Group C in Belgium
Pos	Team
C1	Australia
C2	Spain
C3	Ireland
C4	South Africa

Group D in the Netherlands
Pos	Team
D1	England
D2	India
D3	Pakistan
D4	Wales

=== Schedule ===
Schedule
Round	Gameday	Date
Preliminary round	Gameday 1	15–16 August 2026
Preliminary round	Gameday 2	17–18 August 2026
Preliminary round	Gameday 3	19–20 August 2026
Second round Classification round
Second round Classification round	Gameday 4	21–22 August 2026
Second round Classification round	Gameday 5	23–24 August 2026
Knockout stage
Knockout stage	Semi-finals; Placement games	28 August 2026
Knockout stage	Final	30 August 2026

== Umpires ==
On 20 January 2026, 16 umpires were appointed by the FIH for this tournament.

- Gabriel Labate (ARG)
- Zeke Newman (AUS)
- Steve Rogers (AUS)
- Tyler Klenk (CAN)
- Dan Barstow (ENG)
- Sean Edwards (ENG)
- Ben Göntgen (GER)
- Rawi Anbananthan (MAS)
- Coen van Bunge (NED)
- Jonas van't Hek (NED)
- Michiel Otten (NED)
- Gareth Greenfield (NZL)
- Lim Hong-Zhen (SGP)
- Darren Hubach (RSA)
- Sean Rapaport (RSA)
- You Hyo-sik (KOR)

== First round ==
The hosts schedule was published on 30 September 2025. The match schedule was revealed on 18 March 2026.

All times are local (UTC+2).

=== Pool A ===
Pos	Team	Pld	W	D	L	GF	GA	GD	Pts	Qualification
1	Netherlands (H)	3	3	0	0	12	3	+9	9	Second round
2	Argentina	3	2	0	1	11	4	+7	6	Second round
3	New Zealand	3	1	0	2	4	12	−8	3	9th–16th classification
4	Japan	3	0	0	3	1	9	−8	0	9th–16th classification

Source: FIH
Rules for classification: 1) points; 2) matches won; 3) goal difference; 4) goals for; 5) head-to-head result; 6) field goals scored.
(H) Hosts

16 August 2026
16:00

Netherlands	5–1	New Zealand
Hoedemakers 35', 50'; Telgenkamp 41'; Brinkman 49'; Bijen 52'	Report	Hickson 24'

Wagener Stadium, Amstelveen
Umpires:
Laurine Delforge (BEL)
Steve Rogers (AUS)

16 August 2026
19:00

Argentina	3–0	Japan
L. Toscani 21'; Méndez 54'; Casella 58'	Report

Wagener Stadium, Amstelveen
Umpires:
Sean Edwards (ENG)
Ben Göntgen (GER)

18 August 2026
09:30

New Zealand	2–0	Japan
Lane 12'; Thomas 46'	Report

Wagener Stadium, Amstelveen
Umpires:
Rawi Anbananthan (MAS)
Ben Göntgen (GER)

18 August 2026
18:00

Argentina	1–3	Netherlands
Della Torre 11'	Report	Brinkman 7'; Reyenga 34'; Telgenkamp 42'

Wagener Stadium, Amstelveen
Umpires:
Zeke Newman (AUS)
Sean Rapaport (RSA)

20 August 2026
12:30

New Zealand	1–7	Argentina
Russell 13'	Report	Domene 22', 42', 60'; Capurro 39', 58'; Marcucci 48'; Keenan 52'

Wagener Stadium, Amstelveen

20 August 2026
18:00

Netherlands	4–1	Japan
Van Dam 12'; Janssen 50'; Reyenga 55', 56'	Report	Matsumoto 8'

Wagener Stadium, Amstelveen
Umpires:
Ben Goentgen (GER)
Darren Hubach (RSA)

=== Pool B ===
Pos	Team	Pld	W	D	L	GF	GA	GD	Pts	Qualification
1	Germany	3	2	1	0	7	2	+5	7	Second round
2	Belgium (H)	3	2	0	1	8	6	+2	6	Second round
3	France	3	0	2	1	6	7	−1	2	9th–16th classification
4	Malaysia	3	0	1	2	7	13	−6	1	9th–16th classification

Source: FIH
Rules for classification: 1) points; 2) matches won; 3) goal difference; 4) goals for; 5) head-to-head result; 6) field goals scored.
(H) Hosts

15 August 2026
14:30

Germany	5–1	Malaysia
Brilla 3'; Rühr 4'; Weigand 7'; Warweg 44'; Kaufmann 52'	Report	Azrai 39'

Belfius Hockey Arena, Wavre
Umpires:
Tyler Klenk (CAN)
You Hyo-sik (KOR)

15 August 2026
21:00

Belgium	3–2	France
Onana 17'; Duvekot 44'; Hendrickx 56'	Report	Curty 3'; Vaal 18'

Belfius Hockey Arena, Wavre
Umpires:
Dan Barstow (ENG)
Michiel Otten (NED)

17 August 2026
14:00

France	3–3	Malaysia
Charlet 19'; Haertelmeyer 37'; Jouin 59'	Report	Silverius 5', 45'; Anuar 57'

Belfius Hockey Arena, Wavre
Umpires:
Lim Hong-Zhen (SGP)
Sarah Wilson (SCO)

17 August 2026
20:30

Germany	1–0	Belgium
Brilla 39'	Report

Belfius Hockey Arena, Wavre
Umpires:
Gareth Greenfield (NZL)
Coen van Bunge (NED)

19 August 2026
17:00

France	1–1	Germany
Haertelmeyer 60'	Report	Weigand 43'

Belfius Hockey Arena, Wavre
Umpires:
Gareth Greenfield (NZL)
Lim Hong-Zhen (SGP)

19 August 2026
20:30

Belgium	5–3	Malaysia
Boon 17', 20', 36', 53'; Stockbroekx 43'	Report	Rozemi 32'; Jalil 37'; Anuar 53'

Belfius Hockey Arena, Wavre
Umpires:
Michiel Otten (NED)
You Hyo-sik (KOR)

=== Pool C ===
Pos	Team	Pld	W	D	L	GF	GA	GD	Pts	Qualification
1	Australia	3	2	1	0	6	3	+3	7	Second round
2	Spain	3	2	0	1	6	3	+3	6	Second round
3	Ireland	3	1	0	2	6	7	−1	3	9th–16th classification
4	South Africa	3	0	1	2	4	9	−5	1	9th–16th classification

Source: FIH
Rules for classification: 1) points; 2) matches won; 3) goal difference; 4) goals for; 5) head-to-head result; 6) field goals scored.

16 August 2026
11:30

Australia	3–1	Ireland
Rintala 7', 23'; Govers 27'	Report	Empey 54'

Belfius Hockey Arena, Wavre
Umpires:
Gareth Greenfield (NZL)
Rachel Williams (ENG)

16 August 2026
14:30

Spain	3–1	South Africa
Reyné 12'; Basterra 13', 28'	Report	M. Cassiem 45'

Belfius Hockey Arena, Wavre
Umpires:
Lim Hong-Zhen (SGP)
David Tomlinson (NZL)

18 August 2026
14:00

Spain	0–1	Australia
	Report	Govers 47'

Belfius Hockey Arena, Wavre
Umpires:
Dan Barstow (ENG)
Tyler Klenk (CAN)

18 August 2026
17:00

Ireland	4–1	South Africa
Walker 43'; Cole 49', 56'; Hyland 60'	Report	Melville 38'

Belfius Hockey Arena, Wavre
Umpires:
Michiel Otten (NED)
You Hyo-sik (KOR)

20 August 2026
11:00

Australia	2–2	South Africa
Rintala 38'; Willott 43'	Report	M. Cassiem 4', 44'

Belfius Hockey Arena, Wavre
Umpires:
Dan Barstow (ENG)
Tyler Klenk (CAN)

20 August 2026
17:00

Ireland	1–3	Spain
Cole 19'	Report	Álvarez 9'; Reyné 47', 53'

Belfius Hockey Arena, Wavre
Umpires:
Coen van Bunge (NED)
You Hyo-sik (KOR)

=== Pool D ===
Pos	Team	Pld	W	D	L	GF	GA	GD	Pts	Qualification
1	England	3	3	0	0	16	5	+11	9	Second round
2	India	3	2	0	1	10	8	+2	6	Second round
3	Pakistan	3	0	1	2	7	12	−5	1	9th–16th classification
4	Wales	3	0	1	2	6	14	−8	1	9th–16th classification

Source: FIH
Rules for classification: 1) points; 2) matches won; 3) goal difference; 4) goals for; 5) head-to-head result; 6) field goals scored.

15 August 2026
13:00

India	3–1	Wales
Sanjay 8'; Harmanpreet 11', 43'	Report	Welsh 56'

Wagener Stadium, Amstelveen
Umpires:
Sean Rapaport (RSA)
Zeke Newman (AUS)

15 August 2026
19:00

England	4–1	Pakistan
Rushmere 12'; Ward 28'; Hooper 31'; Albery 47'	Report	Afraz 50'

Wagener Stadium, Amstelveen
Umpires:
Jonas van't Hek (NED)
Darren Hubach (RSA)

17 August 2026
12:30

Pakistan	3–3	Wales
Rehman 3'; Khan 49'; Shahid 51'	Report	G. Furlong 25', 53'; Bradshaw 26'

Wagener Stadium, Amstelveen
Umpires:
Sean Edwards (ENG)
Steve Rogers (AUS)

17 August 2026
15:00

India	2–4	England
Harmanpreet 17'; Dilpreet 25'	Report	Bandurak 14', 55'; Rushmere 39'; Croft 43'

Wagener Stadium, Amstelveen
Umpires:
Ben Göntgen (GER)
Jonas van 't Hek (NED)

19 August 2026
12:30

England	8–2	Wales
Ward 2'; Calnan 13', 20'; Sorsby 22'; Wallace 41'; Hooper 48'; Croft 51'; Bandurak 54'	Report	G. Furlong 58', 59'

Wagener Stadium, Amstelveen
Umpires:
Zeke Newman (AUS)
Steve Rogers (AUS)

19 August 2026
15:00

Pakistan	3–5	India
Shahid 22', 46'; Khan 24'	Report	Harmanpreet 5', 21'; Abhishek 11', 24'; Hardik 35'

Wagener Stadium, Amstelveen
Umpires:
Sean Rapaport (RSA)
Jonas van't Hek (NED)

== Second round ==
=== Pool E ===
Pos	Team	Pld	W	D	L	GF	GA	GD	Pts	Qualification
1	Netherlands (H)	3	2	1	0	8	4	+4	7	Semifinals
2	Argentina	3	2	0	1	9	7	+2	6	Semifinals
3	England	3	1	1	1	7	7	0	4	Fifth place game
4	India	3	0	0	3	6	12	−6	0	Seventh place game

Source: FIH
Rules for classification: 1) points; 2) matches won; 3) goal difference; 4) goals for; 5) head-to-head result; 6) field goals scored.
(H) Hosts

22 August 2026
16:00

Netherlands	3–1	India
Telgenkamp 41'; Hoedemakers 51'; Van Dam 55'	Report	Harmanpreet 52'

Wagener Stadium, Amstelveen
Umpires:
Ben Göntgen (GER)
Sean Rapaport (RSA)

22 August 2026
19:00

England	1–3	Argentina
Hooper 49'	Report	Domene 26', 36', 58'

Wagener Stadium, Amstelveen
Umpires:
Steve Rogers (AUS)
Jonas van't Hek (NED)

24 August 2026
14:45

Argentina	5–3	India
J. Toscani 1'; Della Torre 6'; Domene 33', 45'; L. Toscani 53'	Report	Sukhjeet 10', 58'; Hardik 60'

Wagener Stadium, Amstelveen
Umpires:
Sean Rapaport (RSA)
Steve Rogers (AUS)

24 August 2026
18:00

Netherlands	2–2	England
Janssen 30'; Brinkman 32'	Report	Rushmere 6'; Croft 48'

Wagener Stadium, Amstelveen
Umpires:
Ben Göntgen (GER)
Zeke Newman (AUS)

=== Pool F ===
Pos	Team	Pld	W	D	L	GF	GA	GD	Pts	Qualification
1	Germany	3	2	0	1	6	4	+2	6	Semifinals
2	Spain	3	1	1	1	3	3	0	4	Semifinals
3	Australia	3	1	1	1	4	5	−1	4	Fifth place game
4	Belgium (H)	3	0	2	1	2	3	−1	2	Seventh place game

Source: FIH
Rules for classification: 1) points; 2) matches won; 3) goal difference; 4) goals for; 5) head-to-head result; 6) field goals scored.
(H) Hosts

21 August 2026
17:00

Germany	1–2	Spain
Weigand 26'	Report	Basterra 30', 50'

Belfius Hockey Arena, Wavre
Umpires:
Dan Barstow (ENG)
Sarah Wilson (SCO)

21 August 2026
20:30

Australia	1–1	Belgium
Craig 23'	Report	Boon 37'

Belfius Hockey Arena, Wavre
Umpires:
Michiel Otten (NED)
Coen van Bunge (NED)

23 August 2026
17:30

Germany	4–2	Australia
Müller 11'; Struthoff 12'; Warweg 19'; Von Montgelas 40'	Report	Govers 3'; Rintala 30'

Belfius Hockey Arena, Wavre
Umpires:
Dan Barstow (ENG)
Michiel Otten (NED)

23 August 2026
20:30

Spain	1–1	Belgium
Miralles 46'	Report	Van Doren 4'

Belfius Hockey Arena, Wavre
Umpires:
Gareth Greenfield (NZL)
Coen van Bunge (NED)

== Classification round ==
=== Pool G ===
Pos	Team	Pld	W	D	L	GF	GA	GD	Pts	Qualification
1	New Zealand	3	3	0	0	13	4	+9	9	Ninth place game
2	Pakistan	3	1	1	1	9	10	−1	4	Eleventh place game
3	Japan	3	1	0	2	6	8	−2	3	13th place game
4	Wales	3	0	1	2	7	13	−6	1	15th place game

Source: FIH
Rules for classification: 1) points; 2) matches won; 3) goal difference; 4) goals for; 5) head-to-head result; 6) field goals scored.

22 August 2026
10:00

New Zealand	7–2	Wales
Hickson 22', 25', 56'; Boyde 32'; Russell 35'; Ward 41'; Lane 48'	Report	J. Morgan 8', 23'

Wagener Stadium, Amstelveen
Umpires:
Darren Hubach (RSA)
Zeke Newman (AUS)

22 August 2026
13:00

Pakistan	4–3	Japan
Rana 22', 32'; Hammadudin 33'; Shahid 41'	Report	H. Yamada 7'; Tanaka 15'; Yamasaki 36'

Wagener Stadium, Amstelveen
Umpires:
Rawi Anbananthan (MAS)
Sean Edwards (ENG)

24 August 2026
09:30

Japan	3–2	Wales
S. Yamada 15'; Kawabe 28'; Matsumoto 60'	Report	Draper 49'; Welsh 60'

Wagener Stadium, Amstelveen
Umpires:
Rawi Anbananthan (MAS)
Jonas van't Hek (NED)

24 August 2026
12:30

New Zealand	4–2	Pakistan
Thomas 1'; Boyde 16'; Baker 22'; Russell 49'	Report	Khan 33'; Afraz 38'

Wagener Stadium, Amstelveen
Umpires:
Sean Edwards (ENG)
Darren Hubach (RSA)

=== Pool H ===
Pos	Team	Pld	W	D	L	GF	GA	GD	Pts	Qualification
1	Ireland	3	2	0	1	12	7	+5	6	Ninth place game
2	South Africa	3	1	1	1	7	8	−1	4	Eleventh place game
3	France	3	1	1	1	6	7	−1	4	13th place game
4	Malaysia	3	0	2	1	10	13	−3	2	15th place game

Source: FIH
Rules for classification: 1) points; 2) matches won; 3) goal difference; 4) goals for; 5) head-to-head result; 6) field goals scored.

21 August 2026
11:00

France	1–3	South Africa
Charlet 30'	Report	M. Cassiem 17', 19'; D. Cassiem 60'

Belfius Hockey Arena, Wavre
Umpires:
Gareth Greenfield (NZL)
David Tomlinson (NZL)

21 August 2026
14:00

Ireland	7–4	Malaysia
Lynch 8', 12', 24'; Nelson 19', 39'; McKee 37'; Walker 54'	Report	Kamaruddin 29'; Azahar 36'; Azrai 41'; Fa. Saari 55'

Belfius Hockey Arena, Wavre
Umpires:
Tyler Klenk (CAN)
Lim Hong-Zhen (SGP)

23 August 2026
11:30

Malaysia	3–3	South Africa
Azrai 14', 22'; Fa. Saari 60'	Report	Wynford 17'; Spooner 28'; M. Cassiem 43'

Belfius Hockey Arena, Wavre
Umpires:
David Tomlinson (NZL)
You Hyo-sik (KOR)

23 August 2026
14:30

France	2–1	Ireland
Charlet 42'; T. Clément 59'	Report	Duncan 39'

Belfius Hockey Arena, Wavre
Umpires:
Tyler Klenk (CAN)
Lim Hong-Zhen (SGP)

=== 15th place match ===
28 August 2026
11:00

Wales	2–2	Malaysia
Francis 29'; Barker 53'	Report	Fa. Saari 41'; Anuar 52'
Penalties
J. Morgan (penalty shoot-out scored); Welsh (penalty shoot-out missed); Newbold (penalty shoot-out missed); Pritchard (penalty shoot-out scored)	2–1	(penalty shoot-out missed) Rozemi; (penalty shoot-out missed) Fa. Saari; (penalty shoot-out scored) Fi. Saari; (penalty shoot-out missed) Azrai; (penalty shoot-out missed) Silverius

Belfius Hockey Arena, Wavre
Umpires:
Dan Barstow (ENG)
David Tomlinson (NZL)

=== 13th place match ===
28 August 2026
09:30

Japan	1–3	France
Watanabe 22'	Report	Desgouillons 17'; T. Clément 59'; Charlet 59'

Wagener Stadium, Amstelveen
Umpires:
Rawi Anbananthan (MAS)
Darren Hubach (RSA)

=== Eleventh place match ===
28 August 2026
12:30

Pakistan	4–4	South Africa
Afraz 21'; Ammad 22'; Rana 32'; Hammadudin 60'	Report	De Lora 8'; D. Cassiem 18'; M. Cassiem 40', 55'
Penalties
Hayat (penalty shoot-out scored); Mustafa (penalty shoot-out scored); Shahid (penalty shoot-out scored); Rana (penalty shoot-out missed); Butt (penalty shoot-out scored)	4–3	(penalty shoot-out scored) D. Cassiem; (penalty shoot-out scored) Davis; (penalty shoot-out missed) Neethling; (penalty shoot-out missed) Seale; (penalty shoot-out scored) M. Cassiem

Wagener Stadium, Amstelveen
Umpires:
Sean Edwards (ENG)
You Hyo-sik (KOR)

=== Ninth place match ===
28 August 2026
14:00

New Zealand	6–3	Ireland
Russell 3', 14'; Baker 21'; Lane 26', 46'; Ward 58'	Report	Williams 37'; Cole 38'; Duncan 60'

Belfius Hockey Arena, Wavre
Umpires:
Laurine Delforge (BEL)
Michiel Otten (NED)

=== Seventh place match ===
28 August 2026
17:00

India	3–3	Belgium
Abhishek 6'; Harmanpreet 31', 60'	Report	Duvekot 22'; Labouchere 23'; De Sloover 47'
Penalties
Harmanpreet (penalty shoot-out missed); Sukhjeet (penalty shoot-out missed); Lakra (penalty shoot-out scored); Dilpreet (penalty shoot-out scored); Abhishek (penalty shoot-out scored)	3–4	(penalty shoot-out scored) Boon; (penalty shoot-out missed) Foubert; (penalty shoot-out scored) De Sloover; (penalty shoot-out scored) Hendrickx; (penalty shoot-out scored) Duvekot

Belfius Hockey Arena, Wavre
Umpires:
Tyler Klenk (CAN)
Steve Rogers (AUS)

=== Fifth place match ===
28 August 2026
15:00

England	0–2	Australia
	Report	Govers 30'; Willott 48'

Wagener Stadium, Amstelveen
Umpires:
Lim Hong-Zhen (SGP)
Jonas van 't Hek (NED)

== First to fourth place classification ==
=== Bracket ===
Semi-finals
28 August – Amstelveen
Netherlands	3
Spain	4
28 August – Wavre
Germany	2
Argentina	1

Final
30 August – Wavre
Spain	0
Germany	1
Third place
30 August – Wavre
Netherlands	1
Argentina	2

=== Semifinals ===
28 August 2026
18:00

Netherlands	3–4	Spain
Bijen 22'; Janssen 57' de Mol 59'	Report	Basterra 41', 50', 55'; Cunill 51'

Wagener Stadium, Amstelveen
Umpires:
Ben Göntgen (GER)
Zeke Newman (AUS)

28 August 2026
20:30

Germany	2–1	Argentina
Weigand 33'; Kaufmann 54'	Report	Domene 46'

Belfius Hockey Arena, Wavre
Umpires:
Sean Rapaport (RSA)
Coen van Bunge (NED)

=== Third place match ===
30 August 2026
14:00

Netherlands	1–2	Argentina
Middendorp 49'	Report	Domene 41'; Rey 59'

Belfius Hockey Arena, Wavre
Umpires:
Dan Barstow (ENG)
Sean Rapaport (RSA)

=== Final ===
30 August 2026
16:30

Spain	0–1	Germany
	Report	Struthoff 44'

Belfius Hockey Arena, Wavre
Attendance: 10,000
Umpires:
Gareth Greenfield (NZL)
Coen van Bunge (NED)

== Final ranking ==
Pos	Grp	Team	Pld	W	D	L	GF	GA	GD	Pts	Final result
1st place, gold medalist(s)	B	Germany	7	5	1	1	15	7	+8	16	Gold medal
2nd place, silver medalist(s)	C	Spain	7	4	1	2	13	9	+4	13	Silver medal
3rd place, bronze medalist(s)	A	Argentina	7	5	0	2	22	11	+11	15	Bronze medal
4	A	Netherlands	7	4	1	2	21	12	+9	13	Fourth place
5	C	Australia	6	3	2	1	11	8	+3	11	Fifth place
6	D	England	6	3	1	2	19	12	+7	10	Sixth place
7	B	Belgium	6	2	3	1	13	11	+2	9	Seventh place
8	D	India	6	2	1	3	17	19	−2	7	Eight place
9	A	New Zealand	6	4	0	2	21	19	+2	12	Ninth place
10	C	Ireland	6	2	0	4	17	19	−2	6	Tenth place
11	D	Pakistan	6	1	2	3	17	23	−6	5	Eleventh place
12	C	South Africa	6	1	3	2	14	17	−3	6	Twelfth place
13	B	France	6	2	2	2	12	12	0	8	13th place
14	A	Japan	6	1	0	5	8	18	−10	3	14th place
15	D	Wales	6	0	2	4	12	26	−14	2	15th place
16	B	Malaysia	6	0	3	3	16	25	−9	3	16th place

Source: FIH

== Goalscorers ==
There were 248 goals scored in 50 matches, for an average of 4.96 goals per match.

10 goals

- (Argentina) Tomás Domene

8 goals

- (India) Harmanpreet Singh
- (South Africa) Mustapha Cassiem

7 goals

- (Spain) José Basterra

5 goals

- (Belgium) Tom Boon
- (New Zealand) Kane Russell

4 goals

- (Australia) Blake Govers
- (Australia) Joel Rintala
- (France) Victor Charlet
- (Germany) Justus Weigand
- (Ireland) Lee Cole
- (Malaysia) Abu Kamal Azrai
- (New Zealand) James Hickson
- (New Zealand) Sam Lane
- (Pakistan) Hannan Shahid
- (Wales) Gareth Furlong

3 goals

- (England) Nick Bandurak
- (England) Henry Croft
- (England) Samuel Hooper
- (England) Stuart Rushmere
- (India) Abhishek Nain
- (Ireland) Jonathan Lynch
- (Malaysia) Akhimullah Anuar
- (Malaysia) Faizal Saari
- (Netherlands) Thierry Brinkman
- (Netherlands) Tjep Hoedemakers
- (Netherlands) Jip Janssen
- (Netherlands) Tijmen Reyenga
- (Netherlands) Duco Telgenkamp
- (Pakistan) Afraz Hakeem
- (Pakistan) Sufyan Khan
- (Pakistan) Waheed Rana
- (Spain) Marc Reyné

2 goals

- (Argentina) Bautista Capurro
- (Argentina) Nicolás Della Torre
- (Argentina) Lucas Toscani
- (Australia) Ky Willott
- (Belgium) Roman Duvekot
- (England) Will Calnan
- (England) Sam Ward
- (France) Timothée Clément
- (France) Louis Haertelmeyer
- (Germany) Michel Struthoff
- (Germany) Jakob Brilla
- (Germany) Paul-Philipp Kaufmann
- (Germany) Justus Warweg
- (India) Hardik Singh
- (India) Sukhjeet Singh
- (Ireland) Jeremy Duncan
- (Ireland) Matthew Nelson
- (Ireland) Benjamin Walker
- (Japan) Kazumasa Matsumoto
- (Malaysia) Shello Silverius
- (Netherlands) Koen Bijen
- (Netherlands) Thijs van Dam
- (New Zealand) George Baker
- (New Zealand) Scott Boyde
- (New Zealand) Dylan Thomas
- (New Zealand) Finn Ward
- (Pakistan) Muhammad Hammadudin
- (South Africa) Dayaan Cassiem
- (Wales) Jolyon Morgan
- (Wales) Sam Welsh

1 goal

- (Argentina) Matías Rey
- (Argentina) Maico Casella
- (Argentina) Nicolás Keenan
- (Argentina) Tadeo Marcucci
- (Argentina) Lucio Méndez
- (Argentina) Joaquín Toscani
- (Australia) Tom Craig
- (Belgium) Arthur Van Doren
- (Belgium) Alexander Hendrickx
- (Belgium) Hugo Labouchere
- (Belgium) Nelson Onana
- (Belgium) Arthur De Sloover
- (Belgium) Thibeau Stockbroekx
- (England) James Albery
- (England) Tom Sorsby
- (England) Zachary Wallace
- (France) Eliot Curty
- (France) Mattéo Desgouillons
- (France) Noé Jouin
- (France) Florent Vaal
- (Germany) Hugo von Montgelas
- (Germany) Hannes Müller
- (Germany) Christopher Rühr
- (India) Sanjay Rana
- (India) Dilpreet Singh
- (Ireland) Alistair Empey
- (Ireland) Sam Hyland
- (Ireland) John McKee
- (Ireland) Gregory Williams
- (Japan) Kosei Kawabe
- (Japan) Kaito Tanaka
- (Japan) Jun Watanabe
- (Japan) Hyota Yamada
- (Japan) Shota Yamada
- (Japan) Koji Yamasaki
- (Malaysia) Azmirul Azahar
- (Malaysia) Marhan Jalil
- (Malaysia) Azimuddin Kamaruddin
- (Malaysia) Aiman Rozemi
- (Netherlands) Floris Middendorp
- (Netherlands) Joep de Mol
- (Pakistan) Muhammad Ammad
- (Pakistan) Abdul Rehman
- (South Africa) Trevor de Lora
- (South Africa) Kenton Melville
- (South Africa) Nicholas Spooner
- (South Africa) Luke Wynford
- (Spain) Nicolás Álvarez
- (Spain) Pepe Cunill
- (Spain) Marc Miralles
- (Wales) Liam Barker
- (Wales) Rhys Bradshaw
- (Wales) Jacob Draper
- (Wales) Benjamin Francis

Source: FIH

== Awards ==
2026 Men's FIH Hockey World Cup

Germany
Fourth title

Team squad: Linus Müller, Justus Warweg, Benedikt Schwarzhaupt, Johannes Große, Thies Prinz, Paul-Philipp Kaufmann, Teo Hinrichs, Tom Grambusch (Captain), Christopher Rühr, Justus Weigand, Michel Struthoff, Hugo von Montgelas, Erik Kleinlein, Hannes Müller, Malte Hellwig, Jakob Brilla, Antheus Barry, Joshua Onyekwue-Nnaji, Moritz Ludwig, Jean Danneberg.
Head Coach: André Henning

The awards were announced on 30 August 2026.

Award	Player
Player of the tournament	(Argentina) Tomás Domene
Goalkeeper of the tournament	(Spain) Luis Calzado
Young player of the tournament	(Germany) Justus Warweg

== Broadcasting rights ==
The television channels broadcasting the event is as follows:

=== Qualified teams ===
Territory	Rights holder
Argentina Chile	ESPN
Australia	Seven Sport
Belgium	VRT, RTL Play
China	Shanghai Media Group
England	Channel 4
Germany	Magenta Sport
India	Star Sports 2, Jio Hotstar
Ireland	RTÉ
Malaysia	RTM
Netherlands	NOS
Pakistan	Tapmad, PTV Sports
Spain	TDP, TVE
Scotland	BBC Alba
United States	CBS Sports
Wales	S4C
France Japan New Zealand South Africa	Watch.Hockey

=== Non-qualified teams ===
Territory	Rights holder
Americas	ESPN
Middle East	ON Sport
Canada	CBS Sports
South Asia	Star Sports 2, Jio Hotstar
Rest of World	Watch.Hockey

== See also ==
- 2026 Women's FIH Hockey World Cup
- 2026 FIH Para Hockey World Cup
