= FIH Pro League =

FIH Pro League may refer to:

- Men's FIH Pro League
- Women's FIH Pro League
