= 2009 Men's Hockey World Cup Qualifiers =

Field hockey tournament

Tournament details
- Dates: 31 October – 22 November
- Teams: 18 (from 4 confederations)
- Venue: 3 (in 3 host cities)

Tournament statistics
- Matches played: 54
- Goals scored: 253 (4.69 per match)
- Top scorer: (Argentina) Pedro Ibarra (11 goals)

The 2009 Men's Hockey World Cup Qualifiers were the 12th edition of the Hockey World Cup qualification tournament. Three events were held between October and November 2009 in France, New Zealand and Argentina and only the winner of each would earn a berth to play in the 2010 World Cup, to be held in New Delhi, India.

Pakistan, New Zealand and Argentina each won one of the three tournaments.

== Entrants ==
All five confederations received quotas for teams to participate allocated by the International Hockey Federation based upon the FIH World Rankings. Those teams participated at their respective continental championships but could not qualify through it, and they received the chance to qualify through this tournament based on the final ranking at each competition.

Dates	Event	Location	Qualifier(s)
7–15 March 2009	2009 Pan American Cup	Santiago, Chile	United States; Argentina; Chile
9–16 May 2009	2009 Hockey Asia Cup	Kuantan, Malaysia	Pakistan; China; Malaysia; Japan
10–18 July 2009	2009 Hockey African Cup for Nations	Accra, Ghana	—^{1}
1–8 August 2009	2009 EuroHockey Nations Trophy	Wrexham, Wales	Ireland; Russia; Wales; Czech Republic; Scotland
22–30 August 2009	2009 EuroHockey Nations Championship	Amsterdam, Netherlands	Belgium; France; Austria; Poland
25–29 August 2009	2009 Oceania Cup	Invercargill, New Zealand	New Zealand
Invitational			Italy^{1}

^1–Egypt withdrew from participating. Italy was called to participate instead.

== Qualifier 1 ==
Tournament details
- Host country: France
- City: Lille
- Dates: 31 October – 8 November
- Teams: 6 (from 2 confederations)
- Venue: Lille Hockey Club

Final positions
- Champions: Pakistan
- Runner-up: Japan
- Third place: Poland

Tournament statistics
- Matches played: 18
- Goals scored: 86 (4.78 per match)
- Top scorer: (Pakistan) Sohail Abbas (9 goals)
- Best player: (France) Matthieu Durchon

=== Umpires ===
Below are the 9 umpires appointed by the International Hockey Federation:

- Richmond Attipoe (GHA)
- Diego Barbas (ARG)
- Will Drury (WAL)
- Murray Grime (AUS)
- Jang Jung-min (KOR)
- Vincent Loos (BEL)
- Marcelo Servetto (ESP)
- Amarjit Singh (IND)
- Gus Soteriades (USA)

=== Pool ===
All times are Central European Time (UTC+01:00)

Pos	Team	Pld	W	D	L	GF	GA	GD	Pts	Qualification
1	Pakistan	5	4	0	1	22	6	+16	12	Final
2	Japan	5	4	0	1	14	10	+4	12	Final
3	Poland	5	3	1	1	13	9	+4	10	Third place game
4	France (H)	5	2	1	2	13	12	+1	7	Third place game
5	Russia	5	0	1	4	6	17	−11	1	Fifth place game
6	Italy	5	0	1	4	3	17	−14	1	Fifth place game

Source: FIH
(H) Hosts

31 October 2009
11:30

Japan	4–0	Russia
Tanaka 6', 52', 67'; Tsubouchi 44'	Report

Umpires:
Murray Grime (AUS)
Diego Barbas (ARG)

31 October 2009
13:30

Pakistan	5–0	Italy
Abbas 31', 47'; Imran 43'; Zubair 52'; Khan 68'	Report

Umpires:
Marcelo Servetto (ESP)
Will Drury (WAL)

31 October 2009
15:30

France	2–2	Poland
Durchon 35'; Soyez 45'	Report	Strykowski 17', 58'

Umpires:
Amarjit Singh (MAS)
Jang Jung-min (KOR)

1 November 2009
11:30

Pakistan	5–0	Russia
Butt 23'; Abbasi 31'; Abbas 33'; Imran 37'; Khan 43'	Report

Umpires:
Gus Soteriades (USA)
Diego Barbas (ARG)

1 November 2009
13:30

Japan	3–2	Poland
Tanaka 2'; Ono 14'; Nagasawa 34'	Report	Dutkiewicz 9'; Janiszewski 35'

Umpires:
Richmond Attipoe (GHA)
Jang Jung-min (KOR)

1 November 2009
15:30

Italy	0–3	France
	Report	M. Genestet 9'; Soyez 50', 58'

Umpires:
Vincent Loos (BEL)
Will Drury (WAL)

3 November 2009
11:30

Italy	0–3	Japan
	Report	Hatakeyama 17'; Sakamoto 61'; Anai 65'

Umpires:
Jang Jung-min (KOR)
Richmond Attipoe (GHA)

3 November 2009
13:30

Poland	2–1	Russia
Zywiczka 2'; Mikula 5'	Report	Likov 46'

Umpires:
Vincent Loos (BEL)
Gus Soteriades (USA)

3 November 2009
15:30

France	2–4	Pakistan
Soyez 23'; Becuwe 67'	Report	Ali 8'; Abbas 26', 37'; Butt 55'

Umpires:
Murray Grime (AUS)
Amarjit Singh (MAS)

5 November 2009
11:30

Poland	4–1	Italy
Mikula 33'; Kunklewski 46'; Makowski 61'; Marcinkowski 68'	Report	Lunetta 66'

Umpires:
Will Drury (WAL)
Jang Jung-min (KOR)

5 November 2009
13:30

Japan	1–6	Pakistan
Nagasawa 42'	Report	Abbas 19', 52'; Butt 30', 56'; Zubair 54'; Abbasi 61'

Umpires:
Amarjit Singh (MAS)
Marcelo Servetto (ESP)

5 November 2009
15:30

Russia	3–4	France
Likov 11'; Yankun 49'; Zhirkov 68'	Report	Jansen 4'; M. Genestet 16'; Soyez 55'; T. Genestet 56'

Umpires:
Gus Soteriades (USA)
Vincent Loos (BEL)

7 November 2009
11:30

Pakistan	2–3	Poland
Waqas 29'; Zubair 42'	Report	Mikula 45'; Zywiczka 58'; Kmiec 60'

Umpires:
Gus Soteriades (USA)
Diego Barbas (ARG)

7 November 2009
15:30

Russia	2–2	Italy
Mokrousov 48'; Kolorev 60'	Report	Lanzano 11', 17'

Umpires:
Vincent Loos (BEL)
Richmond Attipoe (GHA)

7 November 2009
17:30

France	2–3	Japan
T. Genestet 21'; Soyez 67'	Report	Hatakeyama 6', 28'; Sakamoto 65'

Umpires:
Murray Grime (AUS)
Marcelo Servetto (ESP)

=== Classification ===
==== Fifth and sixth place ====
8 November 2009
11:05

Russia	2–0	Italy
Platonov 12'; Zhirkov 19'	Report

Umpires:
Richmond Attipoe (GHA)
Amarjit Singh (MAS)

==== Third and fourth place ====
8 November 2009
13:35

Poland	5–4	France
Janiszewski 16'; Rachwalski 38', 59'; Mikula 40'; Szyplik 57'	Report	M. Genestet 5'; Lanos 29'; T. Genestet 30'; Sanchez 41'

Umpires:
Diego Barbas (ARG)
Will Drury (WAL)

==== Final ====
8 November 2009
16:05

Pakistan	3–1	Japan
Khan 12'; Abbas 24', 41'	Report	Tsubouchi 27'

Umpires:
Murray Grime (AUS)
Marcelo Servetto (ESP)

=== Final standings ===
Rank	Team
1	Pakistan
2	Japan
3	Poland
4	France
5	Russia
6	Italy

Qualified for the 2010 World Cup

=== Awards ===
Top Goalscorer	Player of the Tournament	Goalkeeper of the Tournament	Fair Play Trophy
(Pakistan) Sohail Abbas	(France) Matthieu Durchon	(Poland) Mariusz Chyla	Russia

== Qualifier 2 ==
Tournament details
- Host country: New Zealand
- City: Invercargill
- Dates: 7–15 November
- Teams: 6 (from 3 confederations)
- Venue: ILT Hockey Turf

Final positions
- Champions: New Zealand
- Runner-up: Malaysia
- Third place: Scotland

Tournament statistics
- Matches played: 18
- Goals scored: 79 (4.39 per match)
- Top scorer: (New Zealand) Andrew Hayward (7 goals)
- Best player: (New Zealand) Ryan Archibald

=== Umpires ===
Below are the 9 umpires appointed by the International Hockey Federation:

- Saleem Aaron (USA)
- Stewart Dearing (AUS)
- Marcin Grochal (POL)
- Colin Hutchinson (IRL)
- Satoshi Kondo (JPN)
- Satinder Kumar (IND)
- Warren McCully (IRL)
- Tim Pullman (AUS)
- Peter Wright (RSA)

=== Pool ===
All times are New Zealand Daylight Time (UTC+13:00)

Pos	Team	Pld	W	D	L	GF	GA	GD	Pts	Qualification
1	New Zealand (H)	5	5	0	0	28	5	+23	15	Final
2	Malaysia	5	3	1	1	12	9	+3	10	Final
3	China	5	3	0	2	7	12	−5	9	Third place game
4	Scotland	5	2	0	3	8	16	−8	6	Third place game
5	Austria	5	1	1	3	7	11	−4	4	Fifth place game
6	Wales	5	0	0	5	5	14	−9	0	Fifth place game

Source: FIH
(H) Hosts

7 November 2009
12:05

China	2–1	Scotland
Liu Yixian 45'; Na Yubo 60'	Report	S. Dick 4'

Umpires:
Satinder Kumar (IND)
Stewart Dearing (AUS)

7 November 2009
14:05

New Zealand	6–2	Wales
Wilson 17', 60'; Hayward 33', 35', 65'; Burrows 63'	Report	Gay 37', 49'

Umpires:
Tim Pullman (AUS)
Marcin Grochal (POL)

7 November 2009
16:05

Malaysia	2–2	Austria
Amin 6'; Azlan 8'	Report	Grandits 54'; Korper 67'

Umpires:
Colin Hutchinson (IRL)
Peter Wright (RSA)

8 November 2009
13:05

Scotland	0–8	New Zealand
	Report	Inglis 16'; Child 26'; Burrows 34', 46'; Wilson 48', 50', 58', 60'

Umpires:
Satoshi Kondo (JPN)
Peter Wright (RSA)

8 November 2009
15:05

Wales	1–2	Malaysia
Gay 51'	Report	Ahmad 4', 32'

Umpires:
Saleem Aaron (USA)
Stewart Dearing (AUS)

8 November 2009
17:05

Austria	1–2	China
Jelinek 64'	Report	Liu Yixian 35+'; Sun Long 61'

Umpires:
Warren McCully (IRL)
Satinder Kumar (IND)

10 November 2009
14:05

Austria	2–3	Scotland
Proksch 27'; Korper 59'	Report	Stott 37'; Bain 61'; Ralph 66'

Umpires:
Tim Pullman (AUS)
Satoshi Kondo (JPN)

10 November 2009
16:05

Wales	1–2	China
Cornick 44'	Report	Liu Yixian 47'; Na Yubo 57'

Umpires:
Warren McCully (IRL)
Saleem Aaron (USA)

10 November 2009
18:05

New Zealand	4–2	Malaysia
Archibald 6'; Burrows 10'; Shaw 52'; Child 62'	Report	Azlan 30'; Faizal 44'

Umpires:
Colin Hutchinson (IRL)
Marcin Grochal (POL)

12 November 2009
14:05

Malaysia	3–2	Scotland
Faizal 7', 27'; Amin 35'	Report	Bain 37'; Dick 49'

Umpires:
Satinder Kumar (IND)
Saleem Aaron (USA)

12 November 2009
16:05

Austria	2–0	Wales
Korper 18'; Stanzl 50'	Report

Umpires:
Peter Wright (RSA)
Satoshi Kondo (JPN)

12 November 2009
18:05

China	1–6	New Zealand
Dong Yang 69'	Report	Hayward 9', 14'; Burrows 29'; Child 46', 52'; Shaw 56'

Umpires:
Colin Hutchinson (IRL)
Stewart Dearing (AUS)

14 November 2009
10:05

Scotland	2–1	Wales
Dick 37'; Ralph 51'	Report	Barrington 56'

Umpires:
Satoshi Kondo (JPN)
Warren McCully (IRL)

14 November 2009
12:05

New Zealand	4–0	Austria
Burrows 8'; Child 24', 67'; Bhana 29'	Report

Umpires:
Saleem Aaron (USA)
Marcin Grochal (POL)

14 November 2009
14:05

China	0–3	Malaysia
	Report	Kevinder Singh 37'; Ahmad 38'; Nabil 51'

Umpires:
Tim Pullman (AUS)
Satinder Kumar (IND)

=== Classification ===
==== Fifth and sixth place ====
15 November 2009
10:05

Austria	3–2	Wales
Jelinek 42', 52'; Korper 61'	Report	Croxall 39'; Ruxton 41'

Umpires:
Peter Wright (RSA)
Marcin Grochal (POL)

==== Third and fourth place ====
15 November 2009
12:35

China	2–2 (a.e.t.)	Scotland
Liu Yixian 20'; Lu Fenghui 38'	Report	Dick 18'; Bain 24'
Penalties
Liu Yixian (penalty shoot-out scored); De Yunze (penalty shoot-out scored); Sun Tianjun (penalty shoot-out missed); Wo Wei (penalty shoot-out scored)	3–5	(penalty shoot-out scored) Ralph; (penalty shoot-out scored) Dick; (penalty shoot-out scored) Marwaha; (penalty shoot-out scored) Christie; (penalty shoot-out scored) Stott

Umpires:
Colin Hutchinson (IRL)
Stewart Dearing (AUS)

==== Final ====
15 November 2009
15:05

New Zealand	2–1	Malaysia
Hayward 57', 60'	Report	Razie 18'

Umpires:
Satinder Kumar (IND)
Tim Pullman (AUS)

=== Final standings ===
Rank	Team
1	New Zealand
2	Malaysia
3	Scotland
4	China
5	Austria
6	Wales

Qualified for the 2010 World Cup

=== Awards ===
Top Goalscorer	Player of the Tournament	Goalkeeper of the Tournament	Fair Play Trophy
(New Zealand) Andrew Hayward	(New Zealand) Ryan Archibald	(Malaysia) Kumar Subramaniam	Scotland

== Qualifier 3 ==
Tournament details
- Host country: Argentina
- City: Quilmes
- Dates: 14–22 November
- Teams: 6 (from 2 confederations)
- Venue: Estadio Nacional de Hockey

Final positions
- Champions: Argentina
- Runner-up: Belgium
- Third place: Ireland

Tournament statistics
- Matches played: 18
- Goals scored: 88 (4.89 per match)
- Top scorer: (Argentina) Pedro Ibarra (11 goals)
- Best player: (Belgium) Félix Denayer

=== Umpires ===
Below are the 9 umpires appointed by the International Hockey Federation:

- Michiel Bruning (NED)
- Nigel Iggo (NZL)
- Adam Kearns (AUS)
- Andrew Kennedy (ENG)
- Marc Knulle (FRA)
- Martin Madden (SCO)
- Francesco Parisi (ITA)
- Juan Manuel Requena (ESP)
- Gary Simmonds (RSA)

=== Pool ===
All times are Argentina Time (UTC−03:00)

Pos	Team	Pld	W	D	L	GF	GA	GD	Pts	Qualification
1	Argentina (H)	5	4	1	0	20	6	+14	13	Final
2	Belgium	5	3	2	0	21	6	+15	11	Final
3	Ireland	5	2	1	2	12	11	+1	7	Third place game
4	Czech Republic	5	2	1	2	7	14	−7	7	Third place game
5	Chile	5	1	0	4	8	18	−10	3	Fifth place game
6	United States	5	0	1	4	7	20	−13	1	Fifth place game

Source: FIH
(H) Hosts

14 November 2009
11:05

Belgium	4–1	Chile
Luycx 15'; Denayer 19'; Truyens 57'; Dekeyser 60'	Report	C. Rodríguez 2'

Umpires:
Gary Simmonds (RSA)
Michiel Bruning (NED)

14 November 2009
13:05

Ireland	6–1	United States
Watt 4', 7', 13'; Butler 18', 34'; Darling 55'	Report	Coolidge 53'

Umpires:
Marc Knulle (FRA)
Nigel Iggo (NZL)

14 November 2009
15:05

Argentina	1–0	Czech Republic
Almada 10'	Report

Umpires:
Adam Kearns (AUS)
Juan Manuel Requena (ESP)

15 November 2009
11:05

Chile	1–4	Ireland
Kannegiesser 16'	Report	Sothern 37', 67', 69'; Jermyn 61'

Umpires:
Francesco Parisi (ITA)
Juan Manuel Requena (ESP)

15 November 2009
13:05

Belgium	9–0	Czech Republic
Truyens 7', 25'; Dekeyser 12'; Lucyx 40'; Boon 49', 69', 70'; Thys 62'; Vandeweghe 64'	Report

Umpires:
Martin Madden (SCO)
Nigel Iggo (NZL)

15 November 2009
15:05

United States	1–6	Argentina
P. Harris 16'	Report	Vila 9'; L. Rey 13'; Ibarra 16'; Rossi 33'; Brunet 53'; Almada 68'

Umpires:
Andrew Kennedy (ENG)
Gary Simmonds (RSA)

17 November 2009
14:35

United States	1–3	Czech Republic
Ginolfi 65'	Report	Piterak 12'; Bernatek 38'; Jahoda 42'

Umpires:
Marc Knulle (FRA)
Andrew Kennedy (ENG)

17 November 2009
16:45

Ireland	0–3	Belgium
	Report	Truyens 5'; Dekeyser 10'; Van Hove 36'

Umpires:
Adam Kearns (AUS)
Francesco Parisi (ITA)

17 November 2009
17:05

Chile	3–7	Argentina
Zarhi 38'; M. Rodríguez 55', 62'	Report	Ibarra 9', 10', 31', 36', 65'; Almada 52'; M. Vila 54'

Umpires:
Michiel Bruning (NED)
Martin Madden (SCO)

19 November 2009
14:35

United States	1–2	Chile
Reyatt 69'	Report	M. Rodríguez 24'; Kannegiesser 55'

Umpires:
Juan Manuel Requena (ESP)
Martin Madden (SCO)

19 November 2009
16:45

Czech Republic	2–2	Ireland
Babicky 54', 66'	Report	Jermyn 12', 22'

Umpires:
Francesco Parisi (ITA)
Gary Simmonds (RSA)

19 November 2009
17:05

Argentina	2–2	Belgium
Ibarra 48'; Argento 55'	Report	Dekeyser 57'; Lucyx 64'

Umpires:
Nigel Iggo (NZL)
Adam Kearns (AUS)

21 November 2009
11:05

Czech Republic	2–1	Chile
Babicky 10'; Kyndl 17'	Report	Berzcely 63'

Umpires:
Martin Madden (SCO)
Francesco Parisi (ITA)

21 November 2009
13:05

Belgium	3–3	United States
Charlier 5', 52'; Boon 60'	Report	P. Harris 44'; Kundi 59'; Martin 70'

Umpires:
Adam Kearns (AUS)
Andrew Kennedy (ENG)

21 November 2009
15:05

Ireland	0–4	Argentina
	Report	Almada 12'; Ibarra 19', 49'; Cammareri 24'

Umpires:
Marc Knulle (FRA)
Michiel Brunning (NED)

=== Classification ===
==== Fifth and sixth place ====
22 November 2009
09:35

Chile	1–2	United States
Thiermann 70'	Report	P. Harris 48'; Holt 64'

Umpires:
Marc Knulle (FRA)
Andrew Kennedy (ENG)

==== Third and fourth place ====
22 November 2009
12:05

Ireland	2–1 (a.e.t.)	Czech Republic
Ames 25'; Cockram 77'	Report	Bernatek 53'

Umpires:
Michiel Bruning (NED)
Nigel Iggo (NZL)

==== Final ====
22 November 2009
14:35

Argentina	4–3	Belgium
Ibarra 39', 53'; L. Vila 57'; Almada 62'	Report	Charlier 14'; Thys 25'; Dekeyser 48'

Umpires:
Gary Simmonds (RSA)
Juan Manuel Requena (ESP)

=== Final standings ===
Rank	Team
1	Argentina
2	Belgium
3	Ireland
4	Czech Republic
5	United States
6	Chile

Qualified for the 2010 World Cup

=== Awards ===
Top Goalscorer	Player of the Tournament	Goalkeeper of the Tournament	Fair Play Trophy
(Argentina) Pedro Ibarra	(Belgium) Félix Denayer	(Czech Republic) Filip Neusser	Argentina
