= Belarus men's national field hockey team =

Belarus
- Association: Belarus Hockey Federation
- Confederation: European Hockey Federation
- Head Coach: Sergej Drozdov
- Manager: Aliaksandr Yakimenka
- Captain: Tsimur Tsimashkou
Home	Away

FIH ranking
- Current: 37 ▼3 (9 March 2026)
- Highest: 31 (2012, January 2019)
- Lowest: 46 (2007)

World Cup
- Appearances: 1 (first in 1994)
- Best result: 12th (1994)

EuroHockey Championship
- Appearances: 1 (first in 1995)
- Best result: 9th (1995)

The Belarus men's national field hockey team represents Belarus in men's international field hockey and is controlled by the Belarus Hockey Federation, the governing body for field hockey in Belarus. The team was established following the formation of Belarus following the dissolution of the Soviet Union. The team has played in the Men's FIH Hockey World Cup once in 1994, where it finished 12th. It has also qualified for the EuroHockey Championship once in 1995.

The team has won the 2017 Men's EuroHockey Championship III and 2021 Men's EuroHockey Championship III. It qualified for the 2023 Men's EuroHockey Championship Qualifiers. However, it was banned from participating in international events by the International Hockey Federation following the 2022 Russian invasion of Ukraine. As of 2025, the team is still barred from competing in FIH events.

== History ==
Belarus was established following the dissolution of the Soviet Union in 1990. The men's national field hockey team is controlled by the Belarus Hockey Federation, a member of the International Hockey Federation (FIH) and the governing body for field hockey in Belarus. The team made its first and only appearance in the Men's FIH Hockey World Cup held in 1994. However, the team lost all the five matches it played and finished last amongst the 12 teams in the competition. The team qualified for 1995 Men's EuroHockey Nations Championship, its first and only appearance in the tournament. Belarus won placed last in the group stage with one win in five matches and later beat France and Scotland to finish ninth in the overall classification.

Belarus won its first EuroHockey Nations Challenge medal in the 2007 Men's EuroHockey Nations Challenge I held at Kazan, Russia. The team finished runners-up after losing the finals to hosts Russia. The team won the 2017 Men's EuroHockey Championship III held at Sveti Ivan Zelina, Croatia after defeating Italy in the finals.

The team won the 2021 Men's EuroHockey Championship III held at Lousada in August 2021 by defeating the Czech Republic in the final. The team qualified for the 2023 Men's EuroHockey Championship Qualifiers thorough the win. However, in 2022, FIH announced that the Belarusian team was barred from participating in FIH events following the 2022 Russian invasion of Ukraine. The team was prevented from competing in the 2024-25 season after the FIH reiterated its stand.

== Competitive record ==
=== World Cup ===
FIH World Cup record
Year	Round	Position	Pld	W	D	L	GF	GA
(Spain) 1971 until (Pakistan) 1990	Part of the Soviet Union							
(Australia) 1994	11th place game	12th	7	0	0	7	4	17
(Netherlands) 1998 until (India) 2023	Did not qualify							
Total	12th place	1/8	7	0	0	7	4	17

=== European Championships ===
EuroHockey Nations Championship record
Year	Round	Position	Pld	W	D	L	GF	GA
(Belgium) 1970 until (France) 1991	Part of the Soviet Union							
(Republic of Ireland) 1995	9th place game	9th	7	3	0	4	15	22
(Italy) 1999 until (Netherlands) 2021	Did not qualify							
(Germany) 2023	Banned from participating							
Total	Best: 9th	1/12	7	3	0	4	15	22

EuroHockey Nations Challenge record
Year	Level	Position	Pld	W	D*	L	GF	GA	P/R
(Italy) 2005	II	7th	5	2	0	3	12	14	▼
(Russia) 2007	III	2nd	5	3	1	1	22	14	▲
(Wales) 2009	II	6th	5	1	1	3	9	15	Same position
(Ukraine) 2011	II	8th	5	0	1	4	8	15	▼
(Switzerland) 2013	III	3rd	5	3	0	2	23	24	Same position
(Portugal) 2015	III	4th	4	1	0	3	18	17	Same position
(Croatia) 2017	III	1st	5	4	1	0	26	3	▲
(France) 2019	II	7th	5	0	1	4	4	12	▼
(Portugal) 2021	III	1st	4	3	1	0	18	4	▲
Total	Highest: II		43	17	6	20	140	118	–

=== World League and FIH Series ===
Hockey World League & FIH Series record
Season	Position	Round	Pld	W	D *	L	GF	GA
2012–13	Unranked	Round 1	3	1	0	2	6	8
2014–15	33rd	Round 1	4	3	1	0	14	5
2014–15	33rd	Round 2	6	1	0	5	8	24
2016–17	Unranked	Round 1	5	4	0	1	28	10
2018–19	—N/a	Open	5	3	1	1	15	11
2018–19	—N/a	Finals	4	0	0	4	6	17
Total	33rd	2nd round	27	12	2	13	77	75

*Draws include matches decided on a shoot-out.

== See also ==
- Belarus women's national field hockey team
