= 2014–15 Men's FIH Hockey World League Round 2 =

Field hockey tournament

The 2014–15 Men's FIH Hockey World League Round 2 was held from January to March 2015. A total of 24 teams competed in 3 events in this round of the tournament playing for 9 berths in the Semifinals, to be played in June and July 2015.

== Qualification ==
8 teams ranked between 12th and 19th in the FIH World Rankings current at the time of seeking entries for the competition qualified automatically in addition to 14 teams qualified from Round 1 and two nations that did not meet ranking criteria and were exempt from Round 1 to host a Round 2 tournament. Fiji and Sri Lanka withdrew from participating and Oman and Ukraine took their place. The following 24 teams, shown with final pre-tournament rankings, competed in this round of the tournament.

Dates	Event	Location	Quotas	Qualifier(s)
	Ranked 12th to 19th in the FIH World Rankings		8	South Africa (12); Malaysia (13); Canada (14); Ireland (15); Japan (16); France (17); China (18); Poland (19)
	Host nation		2	Singapore (37); United States (27)
1–6 July 2014	Sveti Ivan Zelina, Croatia	2014–15 FIH Hockey World League Round 1	2	Russia (19); Switzerland (38)
2–7 September 2014	Hradec Králové, Czech Republic	2014–15 FIH Hockey World League Round 1	3	Belarus (35); Czech Republic (20); Ukraine (24)
5–7 September 2014	Nairobi, Kenya	2014–15 FIH Hockey World League Round 1	1	Egypt (21)
5–7 September 2014	Dhaka, Bangladesh	2014–15 FIH Hockey World League Round 1	1	Bangladesh (29)
5–7 September 2014	Muscat, Oman	2014–15 FIH Hockey World League Round 1	2	Azerbaijan (31); Oman (23)
12–14 September 2014	Guadalajara, Mexico	2014–15 FIH Hockey World League Round 1	2	Chile (25); Mexico (36)
12–14 September 2014	Lousada, Portugal	2014–15 FIH Hockey World League Round 1	2	Austria (22); Italy (32)
1–5 October 2014	Kingston, Jamaica	2014–15 FIH Hockey World League Round 1	1	Trinidad and Tobago (30)
6–11 December 2014	Suva, Fiji	2014–15 FIH Hockey World League Round 1	0	
Total			24	

== Singapore ==
- Singapore, Singapore, 17–25 January 2015.

All times are Singapore Time (UTC+08:00)

=== First round ===
==== Pool A ====
Team	Pld	W	D	L	GF	GA	GD	Pts
Malaysia	3	3	0	0	28	2	+26	9
Oman	3	2	0	1	5	10	−5	6
Ukraine	3	1	0	2	4	8	−4	3
Singapore	3	0	0	3	4	21	−17	0

17 January 2015
17:30

Malaysia	5–1	Ukraine
Fa. Saari 13'; Rahim 19'; I. Ahmad 36', 53'; Shamsul 57'	Report	Kalinchuk 24'

Umpires:
Chen Dekang (CHN)
Ali Shahbaz (BAN)

17 January 2015
20:00

Oman	3–2	Singapore
Al-Shibli 18'; Bait Jandal 24', 46'	Report	Vanderput 45'; Ferdaus 48'

Umpires:
Kenichi Narita (JPN)
Grzegorz Rysiński (POL)

19 January 2015
15:00

Ukraine	2–1	Singapore
Diachenko 44'; Paziuk 56'	Report	Salim 46'

Umpires:
Ahmed El-Sayed (EGY)
Ali Shahbaz (BAN)

19 January 2015
17:30

Oman	0–7	Malaysia
	Report	Rahim 7'; Fa. Saari 17', 38'; Jalil 22', 27'; I. Ahmad 44'; T. Ahmad 46'

Umpires:
Chen Dekang (CHN)
Zeke Newman (AUS)

20 January 2015
17:30

Ukraine	1–2	Oman
Ozerskyi 19'	Report	M. Al-Hasani 10'; I. Al-Hasani 12'

Umpires:
Chen Dekang (CHN)
Grzegorz Rysiński (POL)

20 January 2015
20:00

Malaysia	16–1	Singapore
Fa. Saari 6', 19', 25', 31', 31', 51'; Ashari 13', 25'; Rahim 24', 52'; Shamsul 37', 53'; Jalil 42'; I. Ahmad 44'; T. Ahmad 58', 60'	Report	Vanderput 32'

Umpires:
Ahmed El-Sayed (EGY)
Zeke Newman (AUS)

==== Pool B ====
Team	Pld	W	D	L	GF	GA	GD	Pts
Poland	3	3	0	0	14	2	+12	9
Japan	3	2	0	1	13	4	+9	6
Bangladesh	3	1	0	2	7	11	−4	3
Mexico	3	0	0	3	1	18	−17	0

17 January 2015
09:00

Japan	5–1	Bangladesh
Miyazaki 2', 31'; Sasaki 11'; Tanaka 18'; Zendana 22'	Report	Chayan 44'

Umpires:
Ahmed El-Sayed (EGY)
Nor Azhar Abiddin (MAS)

17 January 2015
15:00

Poland	6–0	Mexico
Makowski 17'; Bratkowski 26'; Górny 27', 41'; Kozlowski 30', 35'	Report

Umpires:
Lim Hong Zhen (SIN)
Maksym Perepelytsya (UKR)

18 January 2015
15:00

Bangladesh	6–1	Mexico
Hossain 32', 50', 60'; Mahmud 37', 44'; Khisa 43'	Report	Campillo 19'

Umpires:
Ahmed El-Sayed (EGY)
Thani Saheem (OMA)

18 January 2015
17:30

Poland	3–2	Japan
Bratkowski 43'; Makowski 48', 54'	Report	Kitazato 17'; Yamabe 34'

Umpires:
Chen Dekang (CHN)
Zeke Newman (AUS)

20 January 2015
09:00

Japan	6–0	Mexico
Kitazato 1'; Murata 18'; Kawakami 21'; Mitani 42', 53'; Tanaka 56'	Report

Umpires:
Nor Azhar Abiddin (MAS)
Thani Saheem (OMA)

20 January 2015
15:00

Bangladesh	0–5	Poland
	Report	Bratkowski 3', 5', 22'; Chwalisz 42'; Kozlowski 44'

Umpires:
Maksym Perepelytsya (UKR)
Lim Hong Zhen (SIN)

=== Second round ===
Fifth place
Ukraine	3
Bangladesh	1
Seventh place
Mexico	3
Singapore	4

Consolation semifinals
Mexico	2
Ukraine	4
Bangladesh	3
Singapore	0

Quarterfinals
Malaysia	10
Mexico	1
Japan	5
Ukraine	0
Oman (p.s.o.)	3 (2)
Bangladesh	3 (0)
Poland	8
Singapore	0

Semifinals
Malaysia (p.s.o.)	1 (3)
Japan	1 (2)
Oman	1
Poland	7

Final
Malaysia	8
Poland	0
Third place
Japan	4
Oman	0

==== Quarter-finals ====
22 January 2015
09:00

Malaysia	10–1	Mexico
T. Ahmad 4', 30', 31', 48'; Fa. Saari 14'; Rahim 16'; Ashari 19'; I. Ahmad 40'; Jamaluddin 44'; Shamsul 54'	Report	Rangel 24'

Umpires:
Thani Saheem (OMA)
Grzegorz Rysiński (POL)

22 January 2015
15:00

Japan	5–0	Ukraine
Yamabe 12'; Murata 14'; Tanaka 19'; Fujimoto 28'; Kayukawa 34'	Report

Umpires:
Nor Azhar Abiddin (MAS)
Ali Shahbaz (BAN)

22 January 2015
17:30

Oman	3–3	Bangladesh
Bait Jandal 12'; Saad Jumaan 28'; M. Al-Hasani 57'	Report	Shetul 4'; Khisa 30'; Jubair 49'
Penalties
Al-Shibli (penalty shoot-out missed); Al-Shaaibi (penalty shoot-out scored); Al-Balushi (penalty shoot-out missed); M. Al-Hasani (penalty shoot-out scored)	2–0	(penalty shoot-out missed) Mahmud; (penalty shoot-out missed) Jubair; (penalty shoot-out missed) Sarkar; (penalty shoot-out missed) Hossain

Umpires:
Lim Hong Zhen (SIN)
Zeke Newman (AUS)

22 January 2015
20:00

Poland	8–0	Singapore
Wejezowski 11'; Weide 18', 28'; Bratkowski 20', 60'; Hulboj 43'; Chwalisz 54'; Majchrzak 56'	Report

Umpires:
Kenichi Narita (JPN)
Maksym Perepelytsya (UKR)

==== Fifth to eighth place classification ====
===== Crossover =====
23 January 2015
15:00

Mexico	2–4	Ukraine
Campillo 23'; Aguilar 58'	Report	Paziuk 25', 28', 47'; Diachuk 43'

Umpires:
Nor Azhar Abiddin (MAS)
Grzegorz Rysiński (POL)

23 January 2015
17:30

Bangladesh	3–0	Singapore
Shetul 13'; Jubair 29'; Islam 34'	Report

Umpires:
Kenichi Narita (JPN)
Maksym Perepelytsya (UKR)

===== Seventh and eighth place =====
25 January 2015
09:00

Mexico	3–4	Singapore
Aguilar 41', 52'; Othon 55'	Report	Vanderput 3', 35'; Yuhari 19'; Asali 58'

Umpires:
Ali Shahbaz (BAN)
Maksym Perepelytsya (UKR)

===== Fifth and sixth place =====
25 January 2015
15:00

Ukraine	3–1	Bangladesh
Diachuk 4'; Ozerskyi 22'; Paziuk 55'	Report	Das 39'

Umpires:
Nor Azhar Abiddin (MAS)
Grzegorz Rysiński (POL)

==== First to fourth place classification ====
===== Semifinals =====
24 January 2015
15:00

Malaysia	1–1	Japan
Jalil 5'	Report	Tanaka 15'
Penalties
Fa. Saari (penalty shoot-out scored); I. Ahmad (penalty shoot-out missed); T. Ahmad (penalty shoot-out missed); Ashari (penalty shoot-out scored); Fi. Saari (penalty shoot-out scored)	3–2	(penalty shoot-out missed) Kitazato; (penalty shoot-out missed) Mitani; (penalty shoot-out missed) Tanaka; (penalty shoot-out missed) Hoshi; (penalty shoot-out scored) Ono

Umpires:
Chen Dekang (CHN)
Lim Hong Zhen (SIN)

24 January 2015
17:30

Oman	1–7	Poland
Al-Laun 34'	Report	Makowski 5', 8', 40'; Górny 13'; Weide 25'; Chwalisz 53'; Bratkowski 59'

Umpires:
Ahmed El-Sayed (EGY)
Zeke Newman (AUS)

===== Third and fourth place =====
25 January 2015
17:30

Japan	4–0	Oman
Tanaka 36'; Murata 41'; Zendana 50'; Kitazato 57'	Report

Umpires:
Zeke Newman (AUS)
Lim Hong Zhen (SIN)

===== Final =====
25 January 2015
20:00

Malaysia	8–0	Poland
Fa. Saari 3', 33'; Rahim 7', 21', 60'; Fiqri 43'; T. Ahmad 48'; Shamsul 53'	Report

Umpires:
Chen Dekang (CHN)
Ahmed El-Sayed (EGY)

=== Awards ===
- Player of the Tournament: Faizal Saari (MAS)
- Top Scorer: Faizal Saari (MAS) (12 goals)
- Young Player of the Tournament: Shunya Miyazaki (JPN)
- Goalkeeper of the Tournament: Takashi Yoshikawa (JPN)

== San Diego ==
- San Diego, United States, 28 February–8 March 2015.

All times are Pacific Standard Time (UTC−08:00) except the ones on 8 March 2015 which are Pacific Daylight Time (UTC−07:00)

=== First round ===
==== Pool A ====
Team	Pld	W	D	L	GF	GA	GD	Pts
Ireland	3	3	0	0	13	1	+12	9
Austria	3	2	0	1	9	5	+4	6
Italy	3	1	0	2	3	6	−3	3
Chile	3	0	0	3	2	15	−13	0

28 February 2015
13:30

Ireland	8–0	Chile
Darling 5', 30', 53'; Harte 12'; Sothern 13'; McCandless 15'; Dowds 35'; Shimmins 51'	Report

Umpires:
Saleem Aaron (USA)
Deric Lerung (CAN)

28 February 2015
15:15

Austria	3–1	Italy
A. Bele 14'; Körper 19'; Uher 30'	Report	Ferrini 32'

Umpires:
Federico García (URU)
Nku Davis (TRI)

1 March 2015
13:00

Chile	1–2	Italy
Rodriguez 32'	Report	Corsi 40'; Keenan 53'

Umpires:
Warren McCully (IRL)
Mikhail Golovanov (RUS)

1 March 2015
15:15

Austria	1–3	Ireland
Uher 46'	Report	Watt 23'; Sothern 44'; O'Donoghue 54'

Umpires:
Saleem Aaron (USA)
Benjamin Peters (USA)

3 March 2015
13:00

Ireland	2–0	Italy
Magee 5'; O'Donoghue 52'	Report

Umpires:
Saleem Aaron (USA)
Deric Lerung (CAN)

3 March 2015
15:15

Chile	1-5	Austria
Zarhi 6'	Report	Körper 14', 38'; A. Bele 26'; Uher 29'; R. Bele 30'

Umpires:
Diego Barbas (ARG)
Benjamin Peters (USA)

==== Pool B ====
Team	Pld	W	D	L	GF	GA	GD	Pts
Russia	3	3	0	0	12	4	+8	9
Canada	3	2	0	1	9	4	+5	6
United States	3	1	0	2	11	10	+1	3
Trinidad and Tobago	3	0	0	3	2	16	−14	0

28 February 2015
08:30

Russia	6–1	Trinidad and Tobago
Kornilov 10'; Siniagin 14', 14'; Palyanitsa 27'; Yankun 32'; Plesetskiy 43'	Report	Marcano 44'

Umpires:
Warren McCully (IRL)
Pietro Galligani (ITA)

28 February 2015
10:45

Canada	5–2	United States
Bissett 15'; Tupper 17', 49'; Sarmento 33', 34'	Report	Käppeler 9'; Harris 39'

Umpires:
Diego Barbas (ARG)
Oliver Tarnoczi (AUT)

1 March 2015
08:30

Russia	2–1	Canada
Komarov 42'; Palyanitsa 47'	Report	Smythe 11'

Umpires:
Diego Barbas (ARG)
Pietro Calligani (ITA)

1 March 2015
10:45

United States	7–1	Trinidad and Tobago
Holt 31', 49'; Harris 38', 51', 52'; Cunningham 48'; Linney 52'	Report	Daniel 14'

Umpires:
Federico García (URU)
Oliver Tarnoczi (AUT)

3 March 2015
08:30

Canada	3–0	Trinidad and Tobago
Pearson 18'; Smythe 53'; Sarmento 55'	Report

Umpires:
Federico García (URU)
Pietro Calligani (ITA)

3 March 2015
10:45

United States	2–4	Russia
Linney 37'; Cunningham 42'	Report	Kornilov 8'; Shchipachev 22', 24'; Golubev 55'

Umpires:
Warren McCully (IRL)
Oliver Tarnoczi (AUT)

=== Second round ===
Fifth place
Italy	1 (0)
Chile (p.s.o.)	1 (3)
Seventh place
Trinidad and Tobago	3
United States	5

Consolation semifinals
Trinidad and Tobago	1
Italy	2
United States	1
Chile	3

Quarterfinals
Ireland	12
Trinidad and Tobago	2
Canada	4
Italy	0
Austria	2
United States	1
Russia (p.s.o.)	2 (5)
Chile	2 (4)

Semifinals
Ireland	2
Canada	0
Austria (p.s.o.)	1 (4)
Russia	1 (2)

Final
Ireland	2
Austria	1
Third place
Canada	4
Russia	1

==== Quarterfinals ====
5 March 2015
08:30

Ireland	12–2	Trinidad and Tobago
Dowds 1', 43'; Jackson 7'; Gleghorne 19', 49'; Watt 22', 43'; O'Donoghue 34'; Harte 40'; Cargo 46'; Magee 51'; Sothern 59'	Report	Browne 9', 16'

Umpires:
Diego Barbas (ARG)
Oliver Tarnoczi (AUT)

5 March 2015
10:45

Canada	4–0	Italy
Tupper 4', 24', 60'; Bissett 56'	Report

Umpires:
Saleem Aaron (USA)
Mikhail Golovanov (RUS)

5 March 2015
13:00

Austria	2–1	United States
A. Bele 27'; Uher 58'	Report	Holt 45'

Umpires:
Federico García (URU)
Deric Lerung (CAN)

5 March 2015
15:15

Russia	2–2	Chile
Siniagin 21'; Komarov 45'	Report	N. Renz 40'; Rodríguez 58'
Penalties
Golubev (penalty shoot-out scored); Yankun (penalty shoot-out scored); Siniagin (penalty shoot-out scored); Plesetskiy (penalty shoot-out scored); Zamalutdinov (penalty shoot-out scored)	5–4	(penalty shoot-out scored) Achondo; (penalty shoot-out scored) Eggers; (penalty shoot-out scored) Kannegiesser; (penalty shoot-out scored) Rodríguez; (penalty shoot-out missed) Kannegiesser

Umpires:
Warren McCully (IRL)
Pietro Galligani (ITA)

==== Fifth to eighth place classification ====
===== Crossover =====
7 March 2015
08:30

Trinidad and Tobago	1–2	Italy
Browne 11'	Report	Keenan 26'; Cioli 50'

Umpires:
Benjamin Peters (USA)
Deric Lerung (CAN)

7 March 2015
10:45

United States	1–3	Chile
Holt 48'	Report	Maldonado 43'; Kannegiesser 54'; N. Renz 59'

Umpires:
Federico García (URU)
Oliver Tarnoczi (AUT)

===== Seventh and eighth place =====
8 March 2015
08:30

Trinidad and Tobago	3–5	United States
Toussaint 41'; Daniel 54', 57'	Report	Sundeen 12'; Linney 17'; Harris 45', 55', 59'

Umpires:
Federico García (URU)
Pietro Galligani (ITA)

===== Fifth and sixth place =====
8 March 2015
10:45

Italy	1–1	Chile
Keenan 35'	Report	N. Renz 41'
Penalties
Keenan (penalty shoot-out missed); Cioli (penalty shoot-out missed); Dussi (penalty shoot-out missed)	0–3	(penalty shoot-out scored) Achondo; (penalty shoot-out scored) Eggers; (penalty shoot-out missed) Berczely; (penalty shoot-out scored) Rodríguez

Umpires:
Oliver Tarnoczi (AUT)
Benjamin Peters (USA)

==== First to fourth place classification ====
===== Semifinals =====
7 March 2015
13:00

Ireland	2–0	Canada
O'Donoghue 39', 41'	Report

Umpires:
Diego Barbas (ARG)
Mikhail Golovanov (RUS)

7 March 2015
15:15

Austria	1–1	Russia
Heimans 27'	Report	Siniagin 33'
Penalties
Stanzl (penalty shoot-out scored); Uher (penalty shoot-out scored); Fröhlich (penalty shoot-out scored); Eitenberger (penalty shoot-out missed); Körper (penalty shoot-out scored)	4–2	(penalty shoot-out scored) Golubev; (penalty shoot-out scored) Yankun; (penalty shoot-out missed) Siniagin; (penalty shoot-out missed) Plesetskiy

Umpires:
Saleem Aaron (USA)
Warren McCully (IRL)

===== Third and fourth place =====
8 March 2015
13:00

Canada	4–1	Russia
Pearson 12'; Ho-Garcia 17'; Smythe 40'; Curran 55'	Report	Siniagin 58'

Umpires:
Diego Barbas (ARG)
Warren McCully (IRL)

===== Final =====
8 March 2015
15:15

Ireland	2–1	Austria
Darling 2'; O'Donoghue 35'	Report	Körper 4'

Umpires:
Saleem Aaron (USA)
Mikhail Golovanov (RUS)

=== Awards ===
- Player of the Tournament: (Ireland) Shane O'Donoghue
- Top Scorer: Pat Harris (USA) (7 goals)
- Young Player of the Tournament: Francesco Padovani (ITA)
- Goalkeeper of the Tournament: (Ireland) David Harte

== Cape Town ==
- Cape Town, South Africa, 7–15 March 2015.

All times are South African Standard Time (UTC+02:00)

=== First round ===
==== Pool A ====
Team	Pld	W	PKW	PKL	L	GF	GA	GD	Pts
South Africa	3	2	1	0	0	9	6	+3	8
Egypt	3	2	0	0	1	9	5	+4	6
China	3	1	0	1	1	10	9	+1	4
Switzerland	3	0	0	0	3	2	10	−8	0

7 March 2015
14:00

Egypt	3–1	Switzerland
Sayed 30'; Atef 48'; Mamdouh 58'	Report	Reinhard 20'

Umpires:
Marc Knulle (FRA)
Irshad Alizade (AZE)

7 March 2015
16:15

South Africa	4–4	China
Smith 18', 30'; Hykes 43'; Eustice 47'	Report	E L. 7'; Liu Y. 23'; Du T. 37'; Guo X. 37'
Penalties
Smith (penalty shoot-out scored); Panther (penalty shoot-out scored); Paton (penalty shoot-out missed); Halkett (penalty shoot-out scored); Eustice (penalty shoot-out scored)	4–3	Sun L. (penalty shoot-out scored); E L. (penalty shoot-out missed); Meng L. (penalty shoot-out scored); Du C. (penalty shoot-out scored); Sun T. (penalty shoot-out missed)

Umpires:
Eduardo Lizana (ESP)
Tomáš Holek (CZE)

8 March 2015
14:00

China	5–1	Switzerland
Li Z. 12', 45'; Liu Y. 18'; Du T. 20'; Sun L. 50'	Report	Hödle 18'

Umpires:
Sean Rapaport (RSA)
Marc Knulle (FRA)

8 March 2015
16:15

Egypt	2–3	South Africa
Atef 42'; Mohamed 48'	Report	Halkett 6'; Hykes 37'; De Voux 48'

Umpires:
Jonas van't Hek (NED)
Joachim Wimmer (SUI)

10 March 2015
16:15

China	1–4	Egypt
E L. 42'	Report	El-Nagaar 8'; Sayed 25'; Atef 30', 60'

Umpires:
Eduardo Lizana (ESP)
Kirk Mendoza (RSA)

10 March 2015
18:30

South Africa	2–0	Switzerland
Smith 2'; Paton 35'	Report

Umpires:
Marc Knulle (FRA)
Sherif El-Amari (EGY)

==== Pool B ====
Team	Pld	W	PKW	PKL	L	GF	GA	GD	Pts
France	3	3	0	0	0	11	0	+11	9
Czech Republic	3	1	0	1	1	3	5	−2	4
Belarus	3	1	0	0	2	4	8	−4	3
Azerbaijan	3	0	1	0	2	4	9	−5	2

7 March 2015
09:30

France	4–0	Azerbaijan
T. Genestet 14'; Masson 29'; Charlet 35'; H. Genestet 38'	Report

Umpires:
Jonas van't Hek (NED)
Tao Zhinan (CHN)

7 March 2015
11:45

Czech Republic	2–0	Belarus
Vacek 26'; Plochý 55'	Report

Umpires:
Sherif El-Amari (EGY)
Sean Rapaport (RSA)

8 March 2015
09:30

Azerbaijan	3–4	Belarus
Tofeeg 16', 38'; Khalid 54'	Report	Karol 18'; Kisialevich 50'; Kavalski 51'; Kachmarski 56'

Umpires:
Kirk Mendoza (RSA)
Tomáš Holek (CZE)

8 March 2015
11:45

Czech Republic	0–4	France
	Report	T. Genestet 24'; Kieffer 34', 41'; Martin-Brisac 45'

Umpires:
Tao Zhinan (CHN)
Sherif El-Amari (EGY)

10 March 2015
11:45

France	3–0	Belarus
Sanchez 24'; Martin-Brisac 34', 43'	Report

Umpires:
Irshad Alizade (AZE)
Sean Rapaport (RSA)

10 March 2015
14:00

Azerbaijan	1–1	Czech Republic
Nasir 11'	Report	Plochý 14'
Penalties
Satlikov (penalty shoot-out scored); S. Ali (penalty shoot-out missed); K. Ali (penalty shoot-out missed); Zai (penalty shoot-out scored); Tofeeg (penalty shoot-out scored)	3–1	Vacek (penalty shoot-out scored); Piterák (penalty shoot-out missed); Procházka (penalty shoot-out missed); Babičky (penalty shoot-out missed)

Umpires:
Tao Zhinan (CHN)
Joachim Wimmer (SUI)

=== Second round ===
Fifth place
Czech Republic	0
Switzerland	2
Seventh place
Azerbaijan	4
Belarus	2

Consolation semifinals
Azerbaijan	2
Czech Republic	8
Belarus	1
Switzerland	5

Quarterfinals
South Africa	3
Azerbaijan	2
Czech Republic	2
China	6
Egypt	7
Belarus	1
France	5
Switzerland	3

Semifinals
South Africa	0
China	2
Egypt	2
France	5

Final
China	2
France	5
Third place
South Africa	2 (2)
Egypt (p.s.o.)	2 (3)

==== Quarterfinals ====
12 March 2015
11:45

Czech Republic	2–6	China
Průcha 15'; Piterák 54'	Report	Zhang Z. 5'; Sun L. 13', 56'; Liu Y. 14'; E L. 35'; Guo X. 39'

Umpires:
Eduardo Lizana (ESP)
Irshad Alizade (AZE)

12 March 2015
14:00

Egypt	7–1	Belarus
Hassan 4'; Sayed 10'; El-Hady 23'; Ibrahim 30', 60'; Said 39', 52'	Report	Hancharou 2'

Umpires:
Kirk Mendoza (RSA)
Joachim Wimmer (SUI)

12 March 2015
16:15

France	5–3	Switzerland
Forgues 13'; Coisne 13'; Sanchez 21'; Martin-Brisac 42'; Charlet 45'	Report	Reinhard 19'; Keller 19'; Greder 31'

Umpires:
Jonas van't Hek (NED)
Sean Rapaport (RSA)

12 March 2015
18:30

South Africa	3–2	Azerbaijan
Smith 7', 15'; Malgraff 30'	Report	S. Ali 44', 50'

Umpires:
Sherif El-Amari (EGY)
Tao Zhinan (CHN)

==== Fifth to eighth place classification ====
===== Crossover =====
14 March 2015
09:30

Azerbaijan	2–8	Czech Republic
S. Ali 33'; Rzakhanov 43'	Report	Procházka 1', 3', 4'; Vacek 13'; Babičky 16'; Průcha 23'; Ťopek 34'; Koryt'ák 40'

Umpires:
Sherif El-Amari (EGY)
Kirk Mendoza (RSA)

14 March 2015
11:45

Belarus	1–5	Switzerland
Kachmarski 39'	Report	Hödle 31'; Greder 36'; Feller 53'; Wullschleger 58'; Steffen 60'

Umpires:
Tomáš Holek (CZE)
Tao Zhinan (CHN)

===== Seventh and eighth place =====
15 March 2015
09:30

Azerbaijan	4–2	Belarus
K. Ali 33'; Khalid 35', 45', 47'	Report	Hancharou 29'; Kisialevich 41'

Umpires:
Joachim Wimmer (SUI)
Tomáš Holek (CZE)

===== Fifth and sixth place =====
15 March 2015
11:45

Czech Republic	0–2	Switzerland
	Report	Greder 38', 46'

Umpires:
Kirk Mendoza (RSA)
Sean Rapaport (RSA)

==== First to fourth place classification ====
===== Semifinals =====
14 March 2015
16:15

Egypt	2–5	France
El-Hady 2'; Ibrahim 43'	Report	Deront 16'; Kieffer 23'; Sanchez 27'; H. Genestet 29'; T. Genestet 32'

Umpires:
Eduardo Lizana (ESP)
Sean Rapaport (RSA)

14 March 2015
14:00

South Africa	0–2	China
	Report	Liu Y. 24'; Sun L. 52'

Umpires:
Marc Knulle (FRA)
Jonas van't Hek (NED)

===== Third and fourth place =====
15 March 2015
14:00

South Africa	2–2	Egypt
Smith 13'; De Voux 51'	Report	Atef 12'; Ibrahim 59'
Penalties
Paton (penalty shoot-out missed); Bell (penalty shoot-out scored); Panther (penalty shoot-out scored); Eustice (penalty shoot-out missed); Halkett (penalty shoot-out missed)	2–3	(penalty shoot-out scored) Sayed; (penalty shoot-out scored) Mansour; (penalty shoot-out scored) Atef; (penalty shoot-out missed) El-Naggar

Umpires:
Eduardo Lizana (ESP)
Marc Knulle (FRA)

===== Final =====
15 March 2015
16:15

China	2–5	France
Meng W. 34'; Ao Y. 55'	Report	Masson 15'; Baumgarten 25', 35', 50'; H. Genestet 53'

Umpires:
Jonas van't Hek (NED)
Sherif El-Amari (EGY)

=== Awards ===
- Player of the Tournament: Simon Martin-Brisac (FRA)
- Top Scorer: Austin Smith (SA) (6 goals)
- Young Player of the Tournament: Li Zecheng (CHN)
- Goalkeeper of the Tournament: Martin Zylbermann (FRA)
