= 2019 Men's EuroHockey Championship II =

Field hockey tournament

Tournament details
- Host country: France
- City: Cambrai
- Dates: 28 July – 3 August
- Teams: 8 (from 1 confederation)
- Venue: Cambrai HC

Final positions
- Champions: France (1st title)
- Runner-up: Russia
- Third place: Austria

Tournament statistics
- Matches played: 20
- Goals scored: 76 (3.8 per match)
- Top scorer: (France) Viktor Lockwood (7 goals)

The 2019 Men's EuroHockey Championship II was the 8th edition of the Men's EuroHockey Championship II, the second level of the European field hockey championships organized by the European Hockey Federation. It was held from 28 July until 3 August 2019 in Cambrai, France. The tournament also served as a direct qualifier for the 2021 EuroHockey Championship, with the winner France and runner-up Russia qualifying.

The hosts France won their first EuroHockey Championship II title by defeating Russia 4–0 in the final. Austria won the bronze medal by defeating Poland 4–1.

== Qualified teams ==
The following eight teams, shown with pre-tournament world rankings, competed in this tournament.

Dates	Event	Location	Quotas	Qualifiers
19–27 August 2017	2017 EuroHockey Championship	Amstelveen, Netherlands	2	Austria (19); Poland (22)
6–12 August 2017	2017 EuroHockey Championship II	Glasgow, Scotland	4	France (13); Russia (23); Ukraine (27); Czech Republic (30)
30 July – 5 August 2017	2017 EuroHockey Championship III	Sveti Ivan Zelina, Croatia	2	Belarus (33); Italy (26)
Total			8	

== Format ==
The eight teams were split into two groups of four teams. The top two teams advanced to the semi-finals to determine the winner in a knockout system. The bottom two teams played in a new group with the teams they did not play against in the group stage. The last two teams were relegated to the EuroHockey Championship III.

== Results ==
All times are local, CEST (UTC+2).

=== Preliminary round ===
==== Pool A ====
Pos	Team	Pld	W	D	L	GF	GA	GD	Pts	Qualification
1	Russia	3	2	1	0	10	6	+4	7	Semi-finals
2	Austria	3	2	1	0	6	2	+4	7	Semi-finals
3	Italy	3	1	0	2	6	8	−2	3	Pool C
4	Ukraine	3	0	0	3	6	12	−6	0	Pool C

Source: FIH
Rules for classification: 1) points; 2) matches won; 3) goal difference; 4) goals for; 5) head-to-head result; 6) field goals for.

28 July 2019
12:15

Russia	3–1	Italy
Khairullin 37'; Kuraev 42'; Sobolevskiy 57'	Report	Nunez 33'

Umpires:
Lukasz Zwierzchowski (POL)
Tomas Holek (CZE)

28 July 2019
14:30

Austria	2–0	Ukraine
A. Bele 3'; Körper 44'	Report

Umpires:
Xavier Fenaert (FRA)
Antonio Ilgrande (ITA)

29 July 2019
16:45

Ukraine	3–5	Italy
Kovalenko 14'; Polishchuk 54', 58'	Report	Dallons 8'; Nunez 14', 16'; Blom 26'; Lago 49'

Umpires:
Tomas Holek (CZE)
Siarhei Mishevich (BLR)

29 July 2019
19:00

Russia	2–2	Austria
Skiperskiy 26'; Golubev 47'	Report	A. Bele 22'; Unterkircher 40'

Umpires:
Sébastien Michielsen (BEL)
Diego Estebanez (ESP)

31 July 2019
12:15

Austria	2–0	Italy
Thörnblom 23'; Körper 46'	Report

Umpires:
Dave Dowdall (ENG)
Diego Estebanez (ESP)

31 July 2019
14:30

Ukraine	3–5	Russia
Paziuk 5'; Polishchuk 48'; Koshelenko 58'	Report	Lepshkin 13', 47'; Khairullin 14'; Sobolevskiy 52'; Arusiia 58'

Umpires:
Xavier Fenaert (FRA)
Siarhei Mishevich (BLR)

==== Pool B ====
Pos	Team	Pld	W	D	L	GF	GA	GD	Pts	Qualification
1	France (H)	3	3	0	0	12	2	+10	9	Semi-finals
2	Poland	3	1	1	1	5	2	+3	4	Semi-finals
3	Czech Republic	3	0	2	1	1	8	−7	2	Pool C
4	Belarus	3	0	1	2	2	8	−6	1	Pool C

Source: FIH
Rules for classification: 1) points; 2) matches won; 3) goal difference; 4) goals for; 5) head-to-head result; 6) field goals for.
(H) Hosts

28 July 2019
16:45

Poland	4–0	Belarus
Kasprzyk 22'; Janiszewski 23', 52'; Hulbój 59'	Report

Umpires:
Diego Estebanez (ESP)
Maksym Perepelytsya (UKR)

28 July 2019
19:00

France	7–0	Czech Republic
H. Genestet 3'; Charlet 8'; Lockwood 25', 41', 53'; Branicki 42'; Rogeau 59'	Report

Umpires:
Dave Dowdall (ENG)
Siarhei Mishevich (BLR)

30 July 2019
16:45

Czech Republic	1–1	Belarus
Seeman 57'	Report	Mikheichyk 52'

Umpires:
Anton Kochin (RUS)
Lukasz Zwierzchowski (POL)

30 July 2019
19:00

Poland	1–2	France
Kurowski 15'	Report	Martin-Brisac 37'; Masson 45'

Umpires:
Antonio Ilgrande (ITA)
Dave Dowdall (ENG)

31 July 2019
16:45

Czech Republic	0–0	Poland
	Report

Umpires:
Maksym Perpelytsya (UKR)
Anton Kochin (RUS)

31 July 2019
19:00

France	3–1	Belarus
Ponthieu 13'; Lockwood 22', 38'	Report	Belavusau 48'

Umpires:
Sébastien Michielsen (BEL)
Antonio Ilgrande (ITA)

=== Fifth to eighth place classification ===
==== Pool C ====
The points obtained in the preliminary round against the other team are taken over.

Pos	Team	Pld	W	D	L	GF	GA	GD	Pts	Relegation
5	Italy	3	2	1	0	9	6	+3	7	
6	Ukraine	3	2	0	1	10	6	+4	6	
7	Czech Republic	3	0	2	1	3	8	−5	2	EuroHockey Championship III
8	Belarus	3	0	1	2	3	5	−2	1	EuroHockey Championship III

Source: FIH
Rules for classification: 1) points; 2) matches won; 3) goal difference; 4) goals for; 5) head-to-head result; 6) field goals for.

2 August 2019
10:15

Ukraine	1–0	Belarus
Onofriiuk 43'	Report

Umpires:
Anton Kochin (RUS)
Tomas Holek (CZE)

2 August 2019
12:30

Italy	1–1	Czech Republic
Dallons 3'	Report	Plochý 27'

Umpires:
Xavier Fenaert (FRA)
Maksym Perpelytsya (UKR)

3 August 2019
10:15

Italy	3–2	Belarus
Dallons 3'; Nunez 14'; Montone 41'	Report	Lutsevich 14'; Krysiuk 41'

Umpires:
Xavier Frenart (FRA)
Maksym Tsimashkou (UKR)

3 August 2019
12:30

Czech Republic	1–6	Ukraine
Bodnár 36'	Report	Koshelenko 18', 39', 43', 53'; Shevchuk 40'; Polishchuk 55'

Umpires:
Sébestien Michielsen (BEL)
Siarhei Mishevich (BLR)

=== First to fourth place classification ===
Semi-finals
2 August
Russia	2
Poland	0
2 August
France (s.o.)	1 (4)
Austria	1 (3)

Final
3 August
Russia	0
France	4
Third place
3 August
Poland	1
Austria	4

==== Semi-finals ====
2 August 2019
14:45

Russia	2–0	Poland
Khairullin 15'; Proskuriakov 32'	Report

Umpires:
Diego Estebanez (ESP)
Sébastien Michielsen (BEL)

2 August 2019
17:00

France	1–1	Austria
Rogeau 55'	Report	Körper 43'
Penalties
Lockwood (penalty shoot-out missed); Tynevez (penalty shoot-out scored); Van Straaten (penalty shoot-out scored); Dumont (penalty shoot-out missed); Genestet (penalty shoot-out missed); Lockwood (penalty shoot-out scored); Tynevez (penalty shoot-out scored)	4–3	(penalty shoot-out scored) B. Stanzl; (penalty shoot-out scored) Unterkircher; (penalty shoot-out missed) Fröhlich; (penalty shoot-out missed) Uher; (penalty shoot-out missed) Thörnblom; (penalty shoot-out scored) Unterkircher; (penalty shoot-out missed) B. Stanzl

Umpires:
Dave Dowdall (ENG)
Lukasz Zwierzchowski (POL)

==== Third and fourth place ====
3 August 2019
14:45

Poland	1–4	Austria
Krokosz 49'	Report	A. Bele 26'; Steyrer 28'; B. Stanzl 43'; Schmidt 45'

Umpires:
Anton Kochin (RUS)
Tomas Holek (CZE)

==== Final ====
3 August 2019
17:00

Russia	0–4	France
	Report	Lockwood 23', 47'; Tynevez 23'; Ponthieu 47'

Umpires:
Lukasz Zwierzchowski (POL)
Antonio Ilgrande (ITA)

== Statistics ==
=== Final standings ===
Rank	Team
Gold medal	France
Silver medal	Russia
Bronze medal	Austria
4	Poland
5	Italy
6	Ukraine
7	Czech Republic
8	Belarus

Qualified for the 2021 EuroHockey Championship

Relegated to the EuroHockey Championship III

=== Goalscorers ===
There were 76 goals scored in 20 matches, for an average of 3.8 goals per match.

7 goals

- (France) Viktor Lockwood

5 goals

- (Ukraine) Andrii Koshelenko

4 goals

- (Italy) Agustin Nunez

3 goals

- (Austria) Alexander Bele
- (Austria) Michael Körper
- (Italy) Julien Dallons
- (Russia) Marat Khairullin
- (Ukraine) Oleh Polishchuk

2 goals

- (France) Theophile Ponthieu
- (France) Blaise Rogeau
- (Poland) Maciej Janiszewski
- (Russia) Sergey Lepeshkin
- (Russia) Alexey Sobolevskiy

1 goal

- (Austria) Bernhard Schmidt
- (Austria) Benjamin Stanzl
- (Austria) Florian Steyrer
- (Austria) Leon Thörnblom
- (Austria) Fabian Unterkircher
- (Belarus) Uladzislau Belavusau
- (Belarus) Illia Krysiuk
- (Belarus) Ivan Lutsevich
- (Belarus) Yauheni Mikheichyk
- (Czech Republic) Kryštof Bodnár
- (Czech Republic) Lukáš Plochý
- (Czech Republic) Martin Seeman
- (France) Maximilien Branicki
- (France) Simon Martin Brisac
- (France) Victor Charlet
- (France) Hugo Genestet
- (France) Charles Masson
- (France) Etienne Tynevez
- (Italy) Fabio Blom
- (Italy) Pietro Lago
- (Italy) Julian Montone
- (Poland) Mateusz Hulbój
- (Poland) Michał Kasprzyk
- (Poland) Adrian Krokosz
- (Poland) Jacek Kurowski
- (Russia) Georgii Arusiia
- (Russia) Pavel Golubev
- (Russia) Andrey Kuraev
- (Russia) Mikhail Proskuriakov
- (Russia) Alexander Skiperskiy
- (Ukraine) Bohdan Kovalenko
- (Ukraine) Maksym Onofriiuk
- (Ukraine) Viacheslav Paziuk
- (Ukraine) Oleh Polishchuk
- (Ukraine) Vitalii Shevchuk

Source: FIH

== See also ==
- 2019 Men's EuroHockey Championship III
- 2019 Men's EuroHockey Nations Championship
- 2019 Women's EuroHockey Championship II
