= 2012–13 Men's FIH Hockey World League Round 2 =

Field hockey tournament

The 2012–13 Men's FIH Hockey World League Round 2 was held from February to June 2013. A total of 24 teams competing in 4 events were part in this round of the tournament playing for 7 berths in the Semifinals, played from June to July 2013.

== Qualification ==
8 teams ranked between 9th and 16th in the FIH World Rankings current at the time of seeking entries for the competition qualified automatically, but Malaysia was chosen to host a Semifinal. The Czech Republic was invited to take their place. Also, as Azerbaijan withdrew from participating, Oman took their place in the tournament. Additionally 13 teams qualified from Round 1 and three nations that did not meet ranking criteria and were exempt from Round 1 to host Round 2 tournaments. The following 24 teams, shown with final pre-tournament rankings, competed in this round of the tournament.

Dates	Event	Location	Quotas	Qualifier(s)
	Ranked 9th to 16th in the FIH World Rankings		7	India (9); Canada (10); Argentina (11); South Africa (12); Belgium (13); China (14); Japan (16)
	Host nations		3	Brazil (33); France (17); Russia (20)
17–19 August 2012	2012–13 FIH Hockey World League Round 1	Prague, Czech Republic	3	Poland (19); Ukraine (27); Czech Republic (21)
31 August–2 September 2012	2012–13 FIH Hockey World League Round 1	Singapore	1	Bangladesh (40)
7–9 September 2012	2012–13 FIH Hockey World League Round 1	Cardiff, Wales	2	Ireland (15); Austria (22)
7–9 September 2012	2012–13 FIH Hockey World League Round 1	Accra, Ghana	1	Egypt (24)
25–30 September 2012	2012–13 FIH Hockey World League Round 1	Lousada, Portugal	2	Scotland (23); Portugal (50)
14–17 November 2012	2012–13 FIH Hockey World League Round 1	Port of Spain, Trinidad and Tobago	2	Trinidad and Tobago (34); Chile (25)
16–18 November 2012	2012–13 FIH Hockey World League Round 1	Chula Vista, United States	1	United States (29)
27 November–2 December 2012	2012–13 FIH Hockey World League Round 1	Doha, Qatar	1	Oman (36)
8–15 December 2012	2012–13 FIH Hockey World League Round 1	Suva, Fiji	1	Fiji (71)
Total			24	

== New Delhi ==
- New Delhi, India, 18–24 February 2013.

=== Pool ===
Team	Pld	W	D	L	GF	GA	GD	Pts
India	5	5	0	0	37	4	+33	15
Ireland	5	4	0	1	31	7	+24	12
Bangladesh	5	3	0	2	18	17	+1	9
China	5	2	0	3	10	12	−2	6
Oman	5	1	0	4	11	27	−16	3
Fiji	5	0	0	5	8	48	−40	0

Advanced to Semifinals

18 February 2013
14:00

China	4–0	Oman
Su Yanjun 12'; Li Tao 21'; Mi Ji 37'; Meng Wei 58'	Report

Umpires:
Gurinder Singh Sandha (IND)
Rawi Anbananthan (MAS)

18 February 2013
16:00

Ireland	5–2	Bangladesh
Sothern 20', 29', 64'; Cargo 34'; O'Donoghue 55'	Report	Islam 16'; Chayan 19'

Umpires:
Khalil Al-Balushi (OMA)
Javid Sheikh (IND)

18 February 2013
20:00

India	16–0	Fiji
V. R. Raghunath 4', 11', 41'; R. P. Singh 5', 35'; Thimmiah 18'; G. Singh 21'; Mujtaba 28', 38', 59'; K. Singh 46'; Man. Singh 50'; Mal. Singh 51', 63'; C. Singh 53'; D. Singh 55'	Report

Umpires:
Deon Nel (RSA)
Kieran Bolger (IRL)

20 February 2013
16:00

Fiji	0–13	Ireland
	Report	Sothern 60', 64', 66'; Cargo 31', 55'; Harte 41', 58'; Darling 12'; Brown 14'; Maguire 23'; Magee 34'; O'Donoghue 45'; McCabe 63'

Umpires:
Latifur Rahman (BAN)
Deon Nel (RSA)

20 February 2013
18:00

China	2–3	Bangladesh
Na Yubo 11'; Ji Mi 27'	Report	Chayan 5'; Islam 34'; Khisa 50'

Umpires:
Kieran Bolger (IRL)
Gurinder Singh Sangha (IND)

20 February 2013
20:00

India	9–1	Oman
V. R. Raghunath 3', 40'; Rupinder 14', 38'; Thimmaiah 16', 60'; D. Singh 20'; M. Singh 42'; G. Singh 65'	Report	Al-Shar 35'

Umpires:
Rawi Anbananthan (MAS)
Tao Zhinan (CHN)

21 February 2013
14:00

Fiji	1–4	China
Smith 55'	Report	Su Yanjun 13', 37'; Mi Ji 60'; Li Tao 69'

Umpires:
Khalil Al-Baluhsi (OMA)
Latifur Rahman (BAN)

21 February 2013
16:00

Bangladesh	4–1	Oman
Khisa 38'; Nannu 51'; Rashel 60'; Islam 68'	Report	Saad Jumman 65'

Umpires:
Javed Shaikh (IND)
Tao Zhinan (CHN)

21 February 2013
20:00

Ireland	2– 3	India
Harte 27'; Magee 51'	Report	R. P. Singh 16'; V. R. Raghunath 39'; D. Singh 56'

Umpires:
Deon Nel (RSA)
Rawi Anbananthan (MAS)

23 February 2013
16:00

Bangladesh	8–4	Fiji
Das 3', 11'; Kamruzzaman 16'; Chayan 48', 54', 65', 68'; Nannu 55'	Report	Edwards 17'; Ad. Smith 24', 69'; Al. Smith 51'

Umpires:
Khalil Al-Balushi (OMA)
Javed Shaikh (IND)

23 February 2013
18:00

Oman	2–7	Ireland
Al-Shar 28', 50'	Report	Sothern 15', 38'; 26'; Harte 30'; Darling 40', 43'; Carson 56'

Umpires:
Gurinder Singh Sangha (IND)
Tao Zhinan (CHN)

23 February 2013
20:00

China	0–4	India
	Report	V. R. Raghunath 12', 28'; D. Singh 39'; R. P. Singh 43'

Umpires:
Kieran Bolger (IRL)
Rawi Anbananthan (MAS)

24 February 2013
12:00

Oman	7–3	Fiji
Al-Shibli 2', 69'; Al-Balushi 22', 42'; Al-Hasani 40'; Al-Shar 48'; 68'	Report	H. Smith 2'; Saqacala 4'; Dutta 14'

Umpires:
Tao Zhinan (CHN)
Latifur Rahman (BAN)

24 February 2013
16:00

Ireland	4–0	China
Magee 29'; O'Donoghue 35+', 39', 50'	Report

Umpires:
Gurinder Singh Sangha (IND)
Javed Shaikh (IND)

24 February 2013
20:00

India	5–1	Bangladesh
Mujtaba 15', 64'; R. P. Singh 32'; A. Singh 50'; M. Singh 58'	Report	Chayan 5'

Umpires:
Kieran Bolger (RIL)
Deon Nel (RSA)

== Rio de Janeiro ==
- Rio de Janeiro, Brazil, 27 February–5 March 2013.

=== Pool ===
Team	Pld	W	WD	LD	L	GF	GA	GD	Pts
Argentina	5	5	0	0	0	38	4	+34	15
South Africa	5	4	0	0	1	32	8	+24	12
Chile	5	3	0	0	2	9	13	−4	9
Trinidad and Tobago	5	1	1	0	3	11	25	−14	5
United States	5	1	0	1	3	7	17	−10	4
Brazil	5	0	0	0	5	3	33	−30	0

Advanced to Semifinals

27 February 2013
09:00

South Africa	9–0	Brazil
Panther 34', 35', 62'; Norris-Jones 32', 61'; Haley 2'; Smith 11'; Paton 25'; West 51'	Report

Umpires:
Nku Davis (TRI)
Maximiliano Scala (ARG)

27 February 2013
11:00

Argentina	9–2	Trinidad and Tobago
R. Vila 18', 22'; Schickendantz 25', 36'; Peillat 44', 51'; Mazzilli 10'; Paredes 21'; L. Vila 52'	Report	Scipio 57'; Whittington 66'

Umpires:
Olivier Hock (BRA)
Grant Hundley (USA)

27 February 2013
15:30

Chile	1–0	United States
Fernández 50'	Report

Umpires:
Roel van Eert (NED)
Peter Wright (RSA)

28 February 2013
09:00

Argentina	10–0	Brazil
Peillat 8'; Salis 13'; L. Vila 17', 35', 57'; Schickendantz 29', 33', 64'; Paredes 43', 51'	Report

Umpires:
Sebastian Bustamente (CHI)
Jakub Mejzlík (CZE)

28 February 2013
11:00

South Africa	6–1	United States
Panther 3'; Drummond 39'; Norris-Jones 42', 60'; Smith 54'; Hykes 56'	Report	Martínez 63'

Umpires:
Roel van Eert (NED)
Olivier Hock (BRA)

28 February 2013
15:30

Trinidad and Tobago	0–4	Chile
	Report	Zarhi 3'; Binder 29'; Martínez 44'; Gandhi 41'

Umpires:
Maximiliano Scala (ARG)
Peter Wright (RSA)

2 March 2013
09:00

United States	5–0	Brazil
Sundeen 11'; Holt 13', 35'; Berczely 17'; Richter 60'	Report

Umpires:
Sebastian Bustamente (CHI)
Peter Wright (RSA)

2 March 2013
11:00

Trinidad and Tobago	2–9	South Africa
James 4'; 57'	Report	Norris-Jones 6', 12' de Voux 10', 24'; Panther 14'; Drummond 27'; Hykes 39', 56'; Guise-Brown 54' da Graca 55'

Umpires:
Jakub Mejzlík (CZE)
Grant Hundley (USA)

2 March 2013
15:30

Chile	0–6	Argentina
	Report	Salis 20'; Rossi 27'; Paredes 48', 53', 65'; Mazzilli 63'

Umpires:
Roel van Eert (NED)
Nku Davis (TRI)

3 March 2013
09:00

United States	1–1	Trinidad and Tobago
Harris 22'	Report	Toussaint 69'
Penalties
Harris (penalty shoot-out scored); Ginofli (penalty shoot-out scored); Dhadwal (penalty shoot-out scored); Sundeen (penalty shoot-out missed); Scally (penalty shoot-out missed); Harris (penalty shoot-out missed)	3–4	(penalty shoot-out missed) Toussaint; (penalty shoot-out scored) Quan Chan; (penalty shoot-out missed) Eccles; (penalty shoot-out scored) Pierre; (penalty shoot-out scored) James; (penalty shoot-out scored) Pierre

Umpires:
Jakub Mejzlík (CZE)
Oliver Hoch (BRA)

3 March 2013
11:00

Brazil	1–3	Chile
Ferreira 70+'	Report	62'; Richter 64'; Kapsch 69'

Umpires:
Nku Davis (TRI)
Maximiliano Scala (ARG)

3 March 2013
15:30

South Africa	2–4	Argentina
Norris-Jones 40'; Panther 47'	Report	Mazzilli 4'; R. Vila 10'; Callioni 38'; Ibarra 53'

Umpires:
Roel van Eert (NED)
Grant Hundley (USA)

5 March 2013
09:00

Chile	1–6	South Africa
Rodriguez 47'	Report	da Graca 5', 42'; Guise-Brown 31'; Robinson 34'; Norris-Jones 58', 68'

Umpires:
Jakub Mejzlík (CZE)
Maximiliano Scala (ARG)

5 March 2013
11:00

Argentina	9–0	United States
3'; Paredes 6'; M. Vila 10'; R. Vila 16'; Mazzilli 18', 23', 44'; Brunet 26'; Callioni 63'	Report

Umpires:
Nku Davis (TRI)
Peter Wright (RSA)

5 March 2013
15:30

Brazil	2–6	Trinidad and Tobago
Couto 11' de Oliveira 63'	Report	Whittington 10'; James 25', 41'; Quan Chan 40'; Mouttet 52'; Campbell 66'

Umpires:
Sebastian Bustamente (CHI)
Grant Hundley (USA)

== Saint-Germain-en-Laye ==
- Saint-Germain-en-Laye, France, 6–12 May 2013.

=== Pool ===
Team	Pld	W	WD	LD	L	GF	GA	GD	Pts
Belgium	5	5	0	0	0	44	6	+38	15
France	5	4	0	0	1	17	8	+9	12
Canada	5	3	0	0	2	16	13	+3	9
Scotland	5	1	1	0	3	17	17	0	5
Poland	5	1	0	1	3	16	21	−5	4
Portugal	5	0	0	0	5	2	47	−45	0

Advanced to Semifinals

6 May 2013
13:00

Belgium	19–0	Portugal
Boon 4', 6', 25', 35', 62', 68', 68'; Dekeyser 9', 45', 56'; Luypaert 13'; Hendrickx 16'; Briels 17', 46' van Aubel 20', 54', 59'; Dockier 60'; Cosyns 64'	Report

Umpires:
Xavier Fenaert (FRA)
Deric Leung (CAN)

6 May 2013
15:30

Canada	5–3	Scotland
Guest 5'; Pereira 8'; Tupper 26'; Stott; Pearson 53'	Report	Stott 16', 52'; Guest

Umpires:
Will Drury (WAL)
Jorge Santos (POR)

6 May 2013
18:00

France	4–2	Poland
Baumgarten 21'; Durchon 33'; Lockwood 47'; Genestet 68'	Report	Kozlowski 4'; Majchrzak 65'

Umpires:
Eduardo Lizana (ESP)
Geoffroy van Elegem (BEL)

7 May 2013
13:00

Belgium	7–1	Scotland
Dockier 10', 11' van Aubel 20'; Boon 35', 43'; Luypaert 38'; Cosyns 70'	Report	Duke 33'

Umpires:
Krzysztof Cholewa (POL)
Xavier Fenaert (FRA)

7 May 2013
15:30

Canada	3–1	Poland
Tupper 41'; Pearson 49'; Smythe 63'	Report	Hulboj 23'

Umpires:
Eduardo Lizana (ESP)
Will Drury (WAL)

7 May 2013
18:00

Portugal	0–6	France
	Report	Genestet 15'; Durchon 21', 62'; Sevestre 44', 58'; Becuwe 60'

Umpires:
Geoffroy van Elegem (BEL)
Fraser Bell (SCO)

9 May 2013
13:00

Portugal	1–4	Canada
Fernandes 51'	Report	Tupper 4', 35'; Guest 10'; Pereira 70'

Umpires:
Krzysztof Cholewa (POL)
Fraser Bell (SCO)

9 May 2013
15:30

Poland	3–3	Scotland
Nowakowski 20'; Rachwalski 40'; Makowski 57'	Report	Forsyth 2'; Adams 35'; Stott 64'
Penalties
Gorny (penalty shoot-out missed); Bratkowski (penalty shoot-out scored); Rachwalski (penalty shoot-out missed); Majchrzak (penalty shoot-out missed); Makowski (penalty shoot-out scored); Makowski (penalty shoot-out scored); Bratkowski (penalty shoot-out missed)	3–4	(penalty shoot-out scored) Forsyth; (penalty shoot-out scored) Marshall; (penalty shoot-out missed) Bremner; (penalty shoot-out missed) McIntyre; (penalty shoot-out missed) Grassick; (penalty shoot-out scored) Forsyth; (penalty shoot-out scored) Marshall

Umpires:
Deric Leung (CAN)
Geoffroy van Elegem (BEL)

9 May 2013
18:00

France	2–3	Belgium
Becuwe 20'; Lockwood 69'	Report	Boon 34' van Aubel 37'; Luypaert 66'

Umpires:
Eduardo Lizana (ESP)
Will Drury (WAL)

11 May 2013
13:00

Poland	9–1	Portugal
Hutek 14', 68'; Majchrzak 15'; Makowski 17', 46'; Rachwalski 26'; Marcinkowski 40'; Nowakowski 50'; Wachowiak 67'	Report	Silva 35'

Umpires:
Deric Leung (CAN)
Fraser Bell (SCO)

11 May 2013
15:30

Canada	2–5	Belgium
Smythe 21'; Tupper 48'	Report	Boon 2', 42'; Dockier 12', 70' van Aubel 35'

Umpires:
Will Drury (WAL)
Xavier Fernaert (FRA)

11 May 2013
18:00

Scotland	1–2	France
Forsyth 67'	Report	Genestet 26'; Genestet 65'

Umpires:
Eduardo Lizana (ESP)
Jorge Santos (POR)

12 May 2013
13:00

Belgium	10–1	Poland
Dekeyser 14', 17', 20', 63'; Dockier 21'; Gougnard 24'; Boon 44', 64', 70'; Dohmen 67'	Report	Hulboj 56'

Umpires:
Xavier Fernaert (FRA)
Jorge Santos (POR)

12 May 2013
15:30

Scotland	9–0	Portugal
Moodie 19'; Forsyth 15'; 23'; Stott 32'; McIntyre 44'; Marshall 51'; Byers 53'; Grassick 61'; Adams 63'	Report

Umpires:
Deric Leung (CAN)
Krzysztof Cholewa (POL)

12 May 2013
18:00

France	3–2	Canada
Lockwood 16', 55'; Durchon 64'	Report	Jameson 6'; Tupper 12'

Umpires:
Eduardo Lizana (ESP)
Geoffroy van Elegem (BEL)

=== Awards ===
- Player of the Tournament: (Belgium) Tom Boon
- Goalkeeper of the Tournament: (France) Martin Zylbermann
- Top Goalscorer: (Belgium) Tom Boon 15 goals
- Fair Play: Canada

== Elektrostal ==
- Elektrostal, Russia, 27 May–2 June 2013.

=== Pool ===
Team	Pld	W	WD	LD	L	GF	GA	GD	Pts
Japan	5	5	0	0	0	18	6	+12	15
Russia	5	4	0	0	1	17	10	+7	12
Ukraine	5	1	2	0	2	7	12	−5	7
Austria	5	1	1	1	2	14	11	+1	6
Egypt	5	1	0	2	2	11	14	−3	5
Czech Republic	5	0	0	0	5	7	19	−12	0

Advanced to Semifinals

27 May 2013
14:00

Japan	5–1	Ukraine
Kawauchi 6', 13'; Yamabe 39'; Hatakeyama 52', 68'	Report	Ozerskyi 64'

Umpires:
Anton Kochin (RUS)
Ahmed El-Sayed (EGY)

27 May 2013
16:15

Czech Republic	0–4	Austria
	Report	Körper 28', 64'; Monghy 33'; Stanzl 41'

Umpires:
David Sweetman (SCO)
Yoshikuni Tomiyama (JPN)

27 May 2013
18:30

Russia	3–0	Egypt
Azarov 24', 31', 64'	Report

Umpires:
Michael Eilmer (AUT)
Maksym Perepelytsya (UKR)

28 May 2013
14:00

Ukraine	1–0	Czech Republic
Ozerskyi 47'	Report

Umpires:
David Sweetman (SCO)
Ahmed El-Sayed (EGY)

28 May 2013
16:15

Japan	3–1	Egypt
Kawakami 9'; Yoshihara 16'; Hatakeyama 35'	Report	Atef 51'

Umpires:
Anton Kochin (RUS)
Maksym Perepelytsya (UKR)

28 May 2013
18:30

Russia	4–2	Austria
Yankun 6'; Komarov 27'; Azarov 35'; Platonov 61'	Report	Körper 10', 54'

Umpires:
Andrew Kennedy (ENG)
Jakub Mejzlík (CZE)

30 May 2013
14:00

Austria	3–3	Egypt
Eitenberger 3'; Körper 50', 63'	Report	Atef 2', 67'; Abd El-Maksoud 4'
Penalties
Stanzl (penalty shoot-out scored); Eitenberger (penalty shoot-out scored); Grandits (penalty shoot-out scored)	3–1	(penalty shoot-out scored) Mohamed; (penalty shoot-out missed) Edris; (penalty shoot-out missed) Hosny; (penalty shoot-out missed) Abd El-Hakim

Umpires:
Anton Kochin (RUS)
Yoshikuni Tomiyama (JPN)

30 May 2013
16:15

Czech Republic	0–3	Japan
	Report	Nakayama 6', 65'; Kawakami 64'

Umpires:
Andrew Kennedy (ENG)
Maksym Perepelytsya (UKR)

30 May 2013
18:30

Ukraine	1–3	Russia
Polishchuk 27'	Report	Yankun 44'; Korolev 46'; Plesetskiy 53'

Umpires:
Michael Eilmer (AUT)
Jakub Mejzlík (CZE)

1 June 2013
10:30

Austria	2–2	Ukraine
Schmidt 6'; Monghy 48'	Report	Ozerskyi 6'; Luppa 65'
Penalties
Eitenberger (penalty shoot-out scored); Monghy (penalty shoot-out scored); Fröhlich (penalty shoot-out scored); Grandits (penalty shoot-out missed); Uher (penalty shoot-out missed); Eitenberger (penalty shoot-out missed)	3–4	(penalty shoot-out scored) Moroz; (penalty shoot-out scored) Popovchenko; (penalty shoot-out missed) Luppa; (penalty shoot-out scored) Polishchuk; (penalty shoot-out missed) Ozerskyi; (penalty shoot-out scored) Moroz

Umpires:
Jakub Mejzlík (CZE)
Ahmed El-Sayed (EGY)

1 June 2013
12:45

Egypt	5–3	Czech Republic
Sayed 4'; Atef 18'; Mohamed 37', 38'; Abd El-Maksoud 58'	Report	Vohnicky 25'; Vacek 55'; Capouch 61'

Umpires:
Michael Eilmer (AUT)
Maksym Perepelytsya (UKR)

1 June 2013
15:00

Russia	1–3	Japan
Azarov 14'	Report	Yoshihara 9'; Hatakeyama 45'; Kawauchi 66'

Umpires:
Andrew Kennedy (ENG)
David Sweetman (SCO)

2 June 2013
10:30

Egypt	2–2	Ukraine
Atef 33'; Edris 69'	Report	54'; Moroz 67'
Penalties
Mohamed (penalty shoot-out missed); Sayed (penalty shoot-out missed); Mohamed (penalty shoot-out missed); Abd El-Hakim (penalty shoot-out missed); Abd El-Maksoud (penalty shoot-out missed)	0–1	(penalty shoot-out scored) Moroz; (penalty shoot-out missed) Popovchenko; (penalty shoot-out missed) Luppa; (penalty shoot-out missed) Polishchuk

Umpires:
Jakub Mejzlík (CZE)
Yoshikuni Tomiyama (JPN)

2 June 2013
12:45

Japan	4–3	Austria
Tachibana 9', 46'; Kawauchi 63'; Hatakeyama 68'	Report	Schmidt 3'; Monghy 32'; Bele 69'

Umpires:
Andrew Kennedy (ENG)
Anton Kochin (RUS)

2 June 2013
15:00

Czech Republic	4–6	Russia
Lehovec 10'; Seemann 28'; Perinka 30'; Kyndl 64'	Report	Azarov 7', 23'; Plesetskiy 11'; Palyanitsa 29', 44'; Yankun 33'

Umpires:
David Sweetman (SCO)
Michael Eilmer (AUT)
