= 2005 Men's EuroHockey Nations Trophy =

Tournament details
- Host country: Italy
- City: Rome
- Dates: 11–17 September
- Teams: 8 (from 1 confederation)

Final positions
- Champions: Ireland (1st title)
- Runner-up: Czech Republic
- Third place: Wales

Tournament statistics
- Matches played: 20
- Goals scored: 107 (5.35 per match)

The 2005 Men's EuroHockey Nations Trophy was the first ever edition of the Men's EuroHockey Nations Trophy, the second level of the men's European field hockey championships organized by the European Hockey Federation. It was held in Rome, Italy from 11 to 17 September 2005.

The number one and two were promoted to the "A"-level, the 2007 Men's EuroHockey Nations Championship, while the number seven and eight were relegated to the "C"-level, the 2007 Men's EuroHockey Nations Challenge I.

== Results ==
All times are local, CEST (UTC+2).

=== Preliminary round ===
==== Pool A ====
Pos	Team	Pld	W	D	L	GF	GA	GD	Pts	Qualification
1	Ireland	3	2	1	0	12	5	+7	7	Semi-finals
2	Wales	3	2	1	0	6	3	+3	7	Semi-finals
3	Belarus	3	1	0	2	7	11	−4	3	5–8th place semi-finals
4	Russia	3	0	0	3	6	12	−6	0	5–8th place semi-finals

Source: TheSports.org

11 September 2005
11:00

Russia	2–4	Wales

11 September 2005
13:30

Ireland	7–3	Belarus

12 September 2005
16:00

Russia	3–4	Belarus

12 September 2005
19:00

Ireland	1–1	Wales

14 September 2005
11:00

Wales	1–0	Belarus

14 September 2005
13:30

Ireland	4–1	Russia

==== Pool B ====
Pos	Team	Pld	W	D	L	GF	GA	GD	Pts	Qualification
1	Czech Republic	3	2	0	1	7	3	+4	6	Semi-finals
2	Austria	3	2	0	1	9	9	0	6	Semi-finals
3	Italy (H)	3	1	1	1	11	10	+1	4	5–8th place semi-finals
4	Switzerland	3	0	1	2	8	11	−3	1	5–8th place semi-finals

Source: TheSports.org
(H) Hosts

11 September 2005
16:00

Italy	4–5	Austria

12 September 2005
19:00

Switzerland	2–3	Czech Republic

13 September 2005
16:00

Czech Republic	3–0	Austria

12 September 2005
18:45

Italy	4–4	Switzerland

14 September 2005
16:00

Switzerland	2–4	Austria

14 September 2005
18:45

Italy	3–1	Czech Republic

=== Fifth to eighth place classification ===
5–8th place semi-finals
16 September
Belarus	1
Switzerland	2
16 September
Italy	3
Russia	1

Fifth place
17 September
Switzerland	1
Italy	3
Seventh place
17 September
Belarus	4
Russia	1

==== 5–8th place semi-finals ====
16 September 2005
10:30

Belarus	1–2	Switzerland

16 September 2005
13:00

Italy	3–1	Russia

==== Seventh place game ====
17 September 2005
11:00

Belarus	4–1	Russia

==== Fifth place game ====
17 September 2005
13:30

Switzerland	1–3	Italy

=== First to fourth place classification ===
Semi-finals
16 September
Ireland	2
Austria	1
16 September
Wales	1
Czech Republic	3

Final
17 September
Ireland	4
Czech Republic	2
Third place
17 September
Austria	1
Wales	2

==== Semi-finals ====
16 September 2005
16:15

Ireland	2–1	Austria

16 September 2005
18:45

Wales	1–3	Czech Republic

==== Third place game ====
17 September 2005
16:15

Austria	1–2	Wales

==== Final ====
17 September 2005
18:45

Ireland	4–2	Czech Republic

== Final standings ==
Rank	Team
Gold medal	Ireland
Silver medal	Czech Republic
Bronze medal	Wales
4	Austria
5	Italy
6	Switzerland
7	Belarus
8	Russia

Qualified for the 2007 EuroHockey Championship

Relegated to the EuroHockey Challenge I

== See also ==
- 2005 Men's EuroHockey Nations Challenge I
- 2005 Men's EuroHockey Nations Championship
