= Russia national field hockey team =

Russia national field hockey team may refer to:

- Russia men's national field hockey team
- Russia women's national field hockey team
