= World League =

World League may refer to:

- World League of American Football, which later became NFL Europa
- FIH Hockey World League, an international field hockey competition
- FIVB Volleyball World League, a men's volleyball competition
- FINA Water Polo World League, a water polo competition
- the original name for the pro wrestling tournament currently known as the G1 Climax
