= 2012–13 Men's FIH Hockey World League =

Field hockey tournament

Tournament details
- Teams: 54
- Venue: 15 (in 15 host cities)

Final positions
- Champions: Netherlands (1st title)
- Runner-up: New Zealand
- Third place: England

Tournament statistics
- Matches played: 121
- Goals scored: 1067 (8.82 per match)

The 2012–13 Men's FIH Hockey World League was the inaugural season of the men's field hockey national team league series. The tournament started in August 2012 in Prague, Czech Republic and finished in January 2014 in New Delhi, India.

The semifinals of this competition also served as a qualifier for the 2014 Men's Hockey World Cup as the 6 highest-placed teams apart from the host nation and the five continental champions qualified.

The Netherlands won the tournament's Final round for the first time after defeating New Zealand 7–2 in the final. England won the third place match by defeating Australia 2–1.

== Qualification ==
Each national association member of the International Hockey Federation (FIH) had the opportunity to compete in the tournament, and after seeking entries to participate, 62 teams were announced to compete. However, for different reasons, the final count of participating teams was 54.

The 8 teams ranked between 1st and 8th in the FIH World Rankings current at early 2011 received an automatic bye to the Semifinals while the 8 teams ranked between 9th and 16th received an automatic bye to Round 2. Those sixteen teams, shown with qualifying rankings, were the following:

- Australia (1)
- Germany (2)
- Netherlands (3)
- England (4)
- Spain (5)
- South Korea (6)
- New Zealand (7)
- Pakistan (8)
- India (9)
- Canada (10)
- Argentina (11)
- South Africa (12)
- Belgium (13)
- China (14)
- Malaysia (15)
- Japan (16)

== Schedule ==
=== Round 1 ===
Dates	Location	Teams	Round 2 Quotas	Round 2 Qualifier(s)
17–19 August 2012	Prague, Czech Republic	Belarus; Czech Republic; Poland; Ukraine	2	Poland; Ukraine
31 August – 2 September 2012	Singapore	Bangladesh; Hong Kong; Singapore; Thailand	1	Bangladesh
7–9 September 2012	Accra, Ghana	Egypt; Ghana; Nigeria	1	Egypt
7–9 September 2012	Cardiff, Wales	Austria; Ireland; Sweden; Wales	2	Ireland; Austria
25–30 September 2012	Lousada, Portugal	Gibraltar; Italy; Morocco; Portugal; Scotland	2	Scotland; Portugal
14–17 November 2012	Port of Spain, Trinidad and Tobago	Barbados; Chile; Trinidad and Tobago; Venezuela	2	Trinidad and Tobago; Chile
16–18 November 2012	Chula Vista, United States	Guatemala; Mexico; United States	1	United States
27 November – 2 December 2012	Doha, Qatar	Azerbaijan; Oman —^{1} Sri Lanka; Turkey	1	Azerbaijan
8–15 December 2012	Suva, Fiji	Fiji; Papua New Guinea; Vanuatu	1	Fiji

^1 – Qatar´s results were officially deleted from the event due to an eligibility problem with some of its players.

=== Round 2 ===
Dates	Location	Teams Qualified			Semifinals Quotas	Semifinals Qualifier(s)
Dates	Location	Host	By Ranking	From Round 1	Semifinals Quotas	Semifinals Qualifier(s)
18–24 February 2013	New Delhi, India	India	China	Bangladesh; Fiji; Ireland; Oman^{2}	2	India; Ireland
27 February – 5 March 2013	Rio de Janeiro, Brazil	Brazil	Argentina; South Africa	Chile; Trinidad and Tobago; United States	2	Argentina; South Africa
6–12 May 2013	Saint-Germain-en-Laye, France	France	Belgium; Canada	Poland; Portugal; Scotland	2	Belgium; France^{4}
27 May – 2 June 2013	Elektrostal, Russia	Russia	Japan	Austria; Czech Republic^{3} Egypt; Ukraine	1	Japan

^2 – Azerbaijan withdrew from participating and Oman took their place.
^3 – Malaysia was chosen to host a Semifinal therefore exempt from Round 2, to which were qualified by ranking basis. The Czech Republic took their place.
^4 – As Malaysia was chosen to host a Semifinal, one less berth was available at that event. France (17th) qualified as the highest-ranked second-placed team between the Saint-Germain-en-Laye and Elektrostal Round 2 events, leaving Russia (20th) unable to qualify.

=== Semifinals ===
Dates	Location	Teams Qualified			Final Quotas	Final Qualifiers
Dates	Location	Host	By Ranking	From Round 2	Final Quotas	Final Qualifiers
13–23 June 2013	Rotterdam, Netherlands	Netherlands	Australia; New Zealand; Spain	Belgium; France; India; Ireland	4	Belgium; Australia; Netherlands; New Zealand
29 June – 7 July 2013	Johor Bahru, Malaysia	Malaysia	England; Germany; Pakistan; South Korea	Argentina; Japan; South Africa	3	Germany; Argentina; England

=== Final ===
Dates	Location	Teams Qualified	
Dates	Location	Host	From Semifinals
10–18 January 2014	New Delhi, India	India	Argentina; Australia; Belgium; England; Germany; Netherlands; New Zealand

== Final ranking ==
FIH issued a final ranking to determine the world ranking. The final ranking was as follows:

1. Netherlands
2. New Zealand
3. England
4. Australia
5. Belgium
6. India
7. Germany
8. Argentina
9. South Korea
10. Spain
11. Malaysia
12. Japan
13. Pakistan
14. Ireland
15. South Africa
16. France
17. Russia
18. Canada
19. Bangladesh
20. Chile
21. Ukraine
22. Austria
23. China
24. Scotland
25. Egypt
26. Trinidad and Tobago
27. Poland
28. United States
29. Oman
30. Czech Republic
31. Brazil
32. Fiji
33. Portugal
