= 2017 Men's EuroHockey Championship III =

Field hockey tournament

Tournament details
- Host country: Croatia
- City: Sveti Ivan Zelina
- Dates: 30 July – 5 August
- Teams: 7 (from 1 confederation)

Final positions
- Champions: Belarus (1st title)
- Runner-up: Italy
- Third place: Croatia

Tournament statistics
- Matches played: 15
- Goals scored: 84 (5.6 per match)
- Top scorer: (Belarus) Mikhail Paulovich (6 goals)

The EuroHockey Championship III 2017 was the seventh edition of the EuroHockey Championship III, the third tier of the European field hockey championships. It was held from 30 July until 5 August 2017 in Sveti Ivan Zelina, Croatia. The tournament also allowed for promotion to the 2019 Men's EuroHockey Championship II, with the champions (Belarus) and runners-up (Italy) being promoted.

== Qualified teams ==
The following seven teams, shown with pre-tournament world rankings, competed in the tournament.

Dates	Event	Location	Quota(s)	Qualifier(s)
19–27 July 2015	2015 EuroHockey Championship II	Prague, Czech Republic	1	Croatia (42); ~~Switzerland~~
19–25 July 2015	2015 EuroHockey Championship III	Lisbon, Portugal	3	Belarus (38); Italy (35); ~~Sweden~~; Turkey (47)
19–25 July 2015	2015 EuroHockey Championship IV	Vilnius, Lithuania	3	~~Denmark~~; Lithuania (58); Malta (67); Slovakia (52)
Total			7	

== Format ==
The seven teams were split into two groups of three and four teams. The top two teams advanced to the semi-finals to determine the winner in a knockout system. The bottom team from pool A and the bottom two teams from pool B played in a new group with the teams they did not play against in the group stage. Because of only sevens teams participating, no teams were relegated.

== Results ==
All times are local (UTC+2).

=== Preliminary round ===
==== Pool A ====
Pos	Team	Pld	W	D	L	GF	GA	GD	Pts	Qualification
1	Italy	2	2	0	0	13	0	+13	6	Semi-finals
2	Turkey	2	1	0	1	4	8	−4	3	Semi-finals
3	Slovakia	2	0	0	2	1	10	−9	0	Pool C

Source: FIH
Rules for classification: 1) points; 2) goal difference; 3) goals scored; 4) head-to-head result.

30 July 2017
13:30

Italy	6–0	Slovakia
Gai 7', 18', 35', 55'; Dallons 19', 43'	Report

Umpires:
Neil McAlpine (SCO)
Luke Busuttil Leaver (MLT)

31 July 2017
10:00

Turkey	0–7	Italy
	Report	Lago 14', 29'; Keenan 32'; Amorosini 40'; Nunez 50'; Ursone 56'; Julian Montone 59'

Umpires:
Darko Koncic (CRO)
Aliaksandr Viasnou (BLR)

2 August 2017
09:00

Slovakia	1–4	Turkey
Kovačevič 51'	Report	Poyraz 18', 37'; Coklu 46'; Acikgoz 52'

Umpires:
Darko Koncic (CRO)
Luke Busuttil Leaver (MLT)

==== Pool B ====
Pos	Team	Pld	W	D	L	GF	GA	GD	Pts	Qualification
1	Belarus	3	3	0	0	19	1	+18	9	Semi-finals
2	Croatia (H)	3	2	0	1	16	4	+12	6	Semi-finals
3	Lithuania	3	1	0	2	3	12	−9	3	Pool C
4	Malta	3	0	0	3	3	24	−21	0	Pool C

Source: FIH
Rules for classification: 1) points; 2) goal difference; 3) goals scored; 4) head-to-head result.
(H) Hosts

30 July 2017
16:15

Belarus	7–0	Lithuania
Paulovich 3', 22'; Mikheichyk 5', 48'; Kisialevich 6'; Belavusau 45'; Lutsevich 55'	Report

Umpires:
Luca Ferrara (ITA)
Murat Ozdemir (TUR)

30 July 2017
19:00

Croatia	12–1	Malta
Tausan 4', 38'; Fujs 11', 15', 54'; Mihael Cvetko 18'; Premilovac 29'; Tolušić 34'; Hršak 35'; Domagoj Cvetko 45'; Mucić 51'; Zec 60'	Report	Williams 59'

Umpires:
Michiel Otten (NED)
Rokas Galkus (LIT)

1 August 2017
10:00

Lithuania	3–2	Malta
Bubnelis 6'; Bilotas 27'; Balsiukas 45'	Report	George 30'; Grima 44'

Umpires:
Michiel Otten (NED)
Aliaksandr Viasnou (BLR)

1 August 2017
18:30

Croatia	1–3	Belarus
Tausan 35'	Report	Hancharou 7'; Lutsevich 12'; Skorb 54'

Umpires:
Lubos Kamendy (SVK)
Luca Ferrara (ITA)

2 August 2017
16:15

Belarus	9–0	Malta
Hancharou 2'; Paulovich 4', 53'; Liakh 7'; Belavusau 40', 57'; Kisialevich 47'; Sizhuk 53', 56'	Report

Umpires:
Lubos Kamendy (SVK)
Rokas Galkus (LIT)

2 August 2017
18:30

Lithuania	0–3	Croatia
	Report	Plemencic 30'; Tausan 43'; Zec 57'

Umpires:
Neil McAlpine (SCO)
Murat Ozdemir (TUR)

=== Fifth to seventh place classification ===
==== Pool C ====
The points obtained in the preliminary round against the other team are taken over.

Pos	Team	Pld	W	D	L	GF	GA	GD	Pts
5	Malta	2	1	0	1	7	4	+3	3
6	Lithuania	2	1	0	1	4	5	−1	3
7	Slovakia	2	1	0	1	4	6	−2	3

Source: FIH
Rules for classification: 1) points; 2) goal difference; 3) goals scored; 4) head-to-head result.

4 August 2017
09:00

Slovakia	3–1	Lithuania
Bogar 43'; Kovačevič 48', 54'	Report	Bubnelis 8'

Umpires:
Luca Ferrara (ITA)
Aliaksandr Viasnou (BLR)

5 August 2017
13:30

Slovakia	1–5	Malta
Michalovic 5'	Report	Dalli 6', 34'; Degiovanni; 18'; Williams 42'; Plaehn 43'

Umpires:
Michiel Otten (NED)
Murat Ozdemir (TUR)

=== First to fourth place classification ===
Semi-finals
4 August
Belarus	6
Turkey	1
4 August
Italy	2
Croatia	0

Final
5 August
Belarus (s.o.)	1 (3)
Italy	1 (2)
Third place
5 August
Turkey	1
Croatia	3

==== Semifinals ====
4 August 2017
11:15

Belarus	6–1	Turkey
Kisialevich 6', 27'; Paulovich 32', 35'; Mikheichyk 55'; Belavusau 58'	Report	Kilinc 47'

Umpires:
Neil McAlpine (SCO)
Rokas Galkus (LIT)

4 August 2017
13:45

Italy	2–0	Croatia
Nunez 2'; Keenan 32'	Report

Umpires:
Michiel Otten (NED)
Lubos Kamendy (SVK)

==== Third and fourth place ====
5 August 2017
16:00

Turkey	1–3	Croatia
Čeker 60'	Report	Fujs 6'; Mihael Cvetko 48'; Premilovac 54'

Umpires:
Luke Busuttil Leaver (MLT)
Lubos Kamendy (SVK)

==== Final ====
5 August 2017
18:30

Belarus	1–1	Italy
Kisialevich 15+'	Report	Keenan 57'
Penalties
Mikheichyk (penalty shoot-out scored); Kachmarski (penalty shoot-out scored); Hancharou (penalty shoot-out missed); Belavusau (penalty shoot-out missed); Kisialevich (penalty shoot-out missed); Mikheichyk (penalty shoot-out scored)	3–2	(penalty shoot-out scored) Montone; (penalty shoot-out missed) Keenan; (penalty shoot-out missed) Nunez; (penalty shoot-out missed) Carta; (penalty shoot-out scored) Dussi; (penalty shoot-out missed) Montone

Umpires:
Neil McAlpine (SCO)
Darko Koncic (CRO)

== Final standings ==
Rank	Team
Gold medal	Belarus
Silver medal	Italy
Bronze medal	Croatia
4	Turkey
5	Malta
6	Lithuania
7	Slovakia

Promoted to the EuroHockey Championship II
