= 2016–17 Men's FIH Hockey World League =

Field hockey tournament

Tournament details
- Teams: 65
- Venue: 14 (in 14 host cities)

Final positions
- Champions: Australia (2nd title)
- Runner-up: Argentina
- Third place: India

The 2016–17 Men's FIH Hockey World League was the third edition of the men's field hockey national team league series and last season of the World League. The tournament started in April 2016 in Singapore and finished in December 2017 in Bhubaneswar, India.

The Semifinals of this competition also served as a qualifier for the 2018 Men's Hockey World Cup as the 10/11 highest placed teams apart from the host nation and the five continental champions qualified.

Australia won the tournament's Final round for a record second time after defeating Argentina 2–1 in the final match. India won the third place match by defeating Germany 2–1.

From 2019 onwards, the tournament was replaced by Pro League.

== Qualification ==
Each national association member of the International Hockey Federation (FIH) had the opportunity to compete in the tournament, and after seeking entries to participate, several teams were announced to compete.

The 11 teams ranked between 1st and 11th in the FIH World Rankings current at early 2015 received an automatic bye to the Semifinals while the 9 teams ranked between 12th and 20th received an automatic bye to Round 2. Those twenty teams, shown with qualifying rankings, were the following:

- Australia (1)
- Netherlands (2)
- Germany (3)
- England (4)
- Belgium (5)
- Argentina (6)
- India (7)
- New Zealand (8)
- South Korea (9)
- Pakistan (10)
- Spain (11)
- Ireland (12)
- Malaysia (13)
- Canada (14)
- South Africa (15)
- Japan (16)
- Poland (17)
- France (18)
- Russia (19)
- Egypt (20)

== Schedule ==
=== Round 1 ===
Dates	Location	Teams	Round 2 Quotas	Round 2 Qualifier(s)
9–17 April 2016	Singapore, Singapore	Brunei; China; Hong Kong; Kazakhstan; Myanmar; Singapore; Sri Lanka; Thailand; Vietnam	2	China; Sri Lanka
28 June–2 July 2016	Suva, Fiji	Fiji; Papua New Guinea; Solomon Islands; Tonga; Vanuatu	1	Fiji
30 August–4 September 2016	Prague, Czech Republic	Belarus; Cyprus; Czech Republic; Italy; Lithuania; Ukraine	2	Ukraine; Italy
6–11 September 2016	Glasgow, Scotland	Portugal; Scotland; Slovakia; Switzerland; Wales	2	Wales; Scotland
9–11 September 2016	Antalya, Turkey	Austria; Oman; Qatar; Turkey	1	Austria
9–11 September 2016	Accra, Ghana	Ghana; Kenya; Namibia; Nigeria	1	Ghana
27 September–2 October 2016	Salamanca, Mexico	Barbados; Guatemala; Mexico; United States	1	United States
1–9 October 2016	Chiclayo, Peru	Chile; Ecuador; Paraguay; Peru; Uruguay; Venezuela	1	Chile
12 October 2016	Appointed by FIH		3	Barbados; Oman; Switzerland

=== Round 2 ===
Dates	Location	Teams Qualified			Semifinals Quotas	Semifinals Qualifiers
Dates	Location	Host	By Ranking	From Round 1	Semifinals Quotas	Semifinals Qualifiers
4–12 March 2017	Dhaka, Bangladesh	Bangladesh	Egypt; Malaysia	China; Fiji; Ghana; Oman; Sri Lanka	3	Malaysia; China; Egypt
11–19 March 2017	Belfast, Ireland	Ireland	France; Poland	Austria; Italy; Scotland; Ukraine; Wales	3	Ireland; France; Scotland
25 March–2 April 2017	Tacarigua, Trinidad and Tobago	Trinidad and Tobago	Japan; Russia; Canada	Barbados; Chile; Switzerland; United States	2	Japan; Canada

=== Semifinals ===
Dates	Location	Teams Qualified			Final Quotas	Final Qualifiers
Dates	Location	Host	By Ranking	From Round 2	Final Quotas	Final Qualifiers
15–25 June 2017	London, England	England	Argentina; India; Netherlands; Pakistan; South Korea	Canada; China; Malaysia; Scotland	3	Netherlands; Argentina; England
8–23 July 2017	Johannesburg, South Africa	South Africa	Australia; Belgium; Germany; New Zealand; Spain	Egypt; France; Japan; Ireland	4	Belgium; Germany; Australia; Spain

=== Final ===
Dates	Location	Teams Qualified	
Dates	Location	Host	From Semifinals
1–10 December 2017	Bhubaneswar, India	India	Argentina; Australia; Belgium; England; Germany; Netherlands; Spain

== Final ranking ==
FIH issued a final ranking to determine the world ranking. The final ranking was as follows:

1. Australia
2. Argentina
3. India
4. Germany
5. Belgium
6. Spain
7. Netherlands
8. England
9. Malaysia
10. Canada
11. Ireland
12. New Zealand
13. France
14. Pakistan
15. Egypt
16. China
17. South Korea
18. South Africa
19. Scotland
20. Japan
21. United States
22. Russia
23. Oman
24. Wales
25. Austria
26. Trinidad and Tobago
27. Bangladesh
28. Ghana
29. Poland
30. Switzerland
31. Italy
32. Chile
33. Sri Lanka
34. Barbados
35. Ukraine
36. Fiji
