= Men's FIH Hockey World League =

International field hockey tournament

- Most recent season or competition: 2016–17 Men's FIH Hockey World League
- HWL Logo
- Sport: Field hockey
- Founded: 2012; 14 years ago
- Folded: 2017; 9 years ago
- Replaced by: Men's FIH Pro League (2019–present); Hockey Series (2019 only); FIH Nations Cup (from 2022)
- No. of teams: 65 in 2016–17
- Last champion: Australia (2nd title)
- Most titles: Australia (2 titles)
- Website: World League Info

The Men's FIH Hockey World League was an international field hockey competition organised by the International Hockey Federation. The league also served as a qualifier for the 2014 and 2018 Men's Hockey World Cups and the 2016 Olympic Games. Three seasons were held in 2012–13, 2014–15 and 2016–17. It was replaced by the new Men's FIH Pro League and Hockey Series in 2018–19.

== Format ==
The tournament featured four rounds. For each edition the FIH decides the number of events and teams for each round. The number of Round 1 events varied in each cycle depending on the number of participating national teams. Teams were grouped regionally, although European teams were split in several tournaments. The remaining rounds have teams selected with no regional restrictions. The top teams received a bye to a Round 2 or Semifinal event depending on the FIH World Rankings at the time of seeking entries, number which also varied depending on the edition.

Year	Teams	Round 1	Round 2	Semifinals	Final
2012–13	54	9 events of 3 to 5 teams	4 events of 6 teams	2 events of 8 teams	1 event of 8 teams
2014–15	56	9 events of 4 to 8 teams	3 events of 8 teams	2 events of 10 teams	1 event of 8 teams
2016–17	65	8 events of 4 to 9 teams	3 events of 8 teams	2 events of 10 teams	1 event of 8 teams

== Summaries ==
Year	Final host	Final			3rd Place Match			Teams PR / FR
Year	Final host	Champions	Score	Runners-up	3rd place	Score	4th place	Teams PR / FR
2012–13	New Delhi, India	Netherlands	7–2	New Zealand	England	2–1	Australia	54 / 8
2014–15	Raipur, India	Australia	2–1	Belgium	India	5–5 (3–2 pen.)	Netherlands	56 / 8
2016–17	Bhubaneswar, India	Australia	2–1	Argentina	India	2–1	Germany	65 / 8

=== Performance by nation ===
Team	Titles	Runners-up	Third place	Fourth place
Australia	2 (2014–15, 2016–17)			1 (2012–13)
Netherlands	1 (2012–13)			1 (2014–15)
New Zealand		1 (2012–13)		
Belgium		1 (2014–15)		
Argentina		1 (2016–17)		
India			2 (2014–15*, 2016–17*)	
England			1 (2012–13)	
Germany				1 (2016–17)

* = host nation

=== Team appearances ===
Team	2012–13	2014–15	2016–17	Apps at Finals
Argentina	8th	5th	2nd	3
Australia	4th	1st	1st	3
Austria	22nd	19th	25th	–
Azerbaijan	Round 1	31st	–	–
Bangladesh	19th	28th	27th	–
Barbados	Round 1	Round 1	34th	–
Belarus	Round 1	33rd	Round 1	–
Belgium	5th	2nd	5th	3
Brazil	31st	Round 1	–	–
Brunei	–	–	Round 1	–
Bulgaria	–	Round 1	–	–
Canada	18th	8th	10th	1
Chile	20th	26th	32nd	–
China	23rd	20th	16th	–
Croatia	–	Round 1	–	–
Cyprus	–	–	Round 1	–
Czech Republic	30th	27th	Round 1	–
Dominican Republic	–	Round 1	–	–
Ecuador	–	–	Round 1	–
Egypt	25th	18th	15th	–
England~	3rd	6th	8th	3
Fiji	32nd	Round 1	36th	–
France	16th	14th	13th	–
Germany	7th	7th	4th	3
Ghana	Round 1	Round 1	28th	–
Gibraltar	Round 1	–	–	–
Guatemala	Round 1	Round 1	Round 1	–
Hong Kong	Round 1	Round 1	Round 1	–
India	6th	3rd	3rd	3
Iran	–	Round 1	–	–
Ireland	14th	9th	11th	–
Italy	Round 1	29th	31st	–
Jamaica	–	Round 1	–	–
Japan	12th	16th	20th	–
Kazakhstan	–	–	Round 1	–
Kenya	—	Round 1	Round 1	–
Lithuania	–	Round 1	Round 1	–
Malaysia	11th	12th	9th	–
Mexico	Round 1	35th	Round 1	–
Morocco	Round 1	–	–	–
Myanmar	–	–	Round 1	–
Namibia	–	–	Round 1	–
Netherlands	1st	4th	7th	3
New Zealand	2nd	11th	12th	1
Nigeria	Round 1	–	Round 1	–
Oman	29th	23rd	23rd	–
Pakistan	13th	15th	14th	–
Papua New Guinea	Round 1	Round 1	Round 1	–
Paraguay	–	–	Round 1	–
Peru	–	–	Round 1	–
Poland	27th	17th	29th	–
Portugal	33rd	Round 1	Round 1	–
Qatar	DSQ	–	Round 1	–
Russia	17th	21st	22nd	–
Samoa	–	Round 1	–	–
Scotland	24th	–	19th	–
Singapore	Round 1	32nd	Round 1	–
Slovakia	–	Round 1	Round 1	–
Solomon Islands	–	–	Round 1	–
South Africa	15th	22nd	18th	–
South Korea	9th	13th	17th	–
Spain	10th	10th	6th	1
Sri Lanka	Round 1	Round 1	33rd	–
Sweden	Round 1	–	–	–
Switzerland	–	25th	30th	–
Tanzania	–	Round 1	–	–
Thailand	Round 1	Round 1	Round 1	–
Tonga	–	–	Round 1	–
Trinidad and Tobago	26th	34th	26th	–
Turkey	Round 1	Round 1	Round 1	–
Ukraine	21st	24th	35th	–
United States	28th	30th	21st	–
Uruguay	–	–	Round 1	–
Vanuatu	Round 1	–	Round 1	–
Venezuela	Round 1	–	Round 1	–
Vietnam	–	–	Round 1	–
Wales	Round 1	–	24th	–
Total	54	56	65	

* = host nation
~ = includes results representing Great Britain

== See also ==
- FIH Hockey Series
- Men's FIH Pro League
- Women's FIH Hockey World League
