= 2014–15 Men's FIH Hockey World League =

Field hockey tournament

Tournament details
- Teams: 56
- Venue: 15 (in 15 host cities)

Final positions
- Champions: Australia (1st title)
- Runner-up: Belgium
- Third place: India

Tournament statistics
- Matches played: 213
- Goals scored: 1147 (5.38 per match)

The 2014–15 Men's FIH Hockey World League was the second season of the men's field hockey national team league series. The tournament started in July 2014 in Sveti Ivan Zelina, Croatia and finished in December 2015 in Raipur, India.

The Semifinals of this competition also served as a qualifier for the 2016 Summer Olympics as the 6 highest placed teams apart from the host nation and the five continental champions qualified.

Australia won the tournament's Final round for the first time after defeating Belgium 2–1 in the final match. India won the third place match by defeating the Netherlands 3–2 on a penalty shootout after a 5–5 draw in regular time.

== Qualification ==
Each national association member of the International Hockey Federation (FIH) had the opportunity to compete in the tournament, and after seeking entries to participate, 56 teams were announced to compete.

The 11 teams ranked between 1st and 11th in the FIH World Rankings current at early 2013 received an automatic bye to the Semifinals while the 8 teams ranked between 12th and 19th received an automatic bye to Round 2. Those nineteen teams, shown with qualifying rankings, were the following:

- Germany (1)
- Australia (2)
- Netherlands (3)
- Great Britain (4)
- Pakistan (5)
- New Zealand (6)
- Spain (7)
- South Korea (8)
- Belgium (9)
- Argentina (10)
- India (11)
- South Africa (12)
- Malaysia (13)
- Canada (14)
- Ireland (15)
- Japan (16)
- France (17)
- China (18)
- Poland (19)

== Schedule ==
=== Round 1 ===
Dates	Location	Teams	Round 2 Quotas	Round 2 Qualifier(s)
1–6 July 2014	Sveti Ivan Zelina, Croatia	Bulgaria; Croatia; Russia; Switzerland; Turkey	2	Russia; Switzerland
2–7 September 2014	Hradec Králové, Czech Republic	Belarus; Czech Republic; Lithuania; Slovakia; Ukraine	3	Belarus; Czech Republic; Ukraine
5–7 September 2014	Dhaka, Bangladesh	Bangladesh; Hong Kong; Sri Lanka	1	Bangladesh
5–7 September 2014	Muscat, Oman	Azerbaijan; Iran; Oman; Thailand	2	Azerbaijan; Oman
5–7 September 2014	Nairobi, Kenya	Egypt; Ghana; Kenya; Tanzania	1	Egypt
12–14 September 2014	Guadalajara, Mexico	Brazil; Chile; Guatemala; Mexico	2	Chile; Mexico
12–14 September 2014	Lousada, Portugal	Austria; Italy; Portugal	2	Austria; Italy
1–5 October 2014	Kingston, Jamaica	Barbados; Dominican Republic; Jamaica; Trinidad and Tobago	1	Trinidad and Tobago
6–11 December 2014	Suva, Fiji	Fiji; Papua New Guinea; Samoa	0	

=== Round 2 ===
Dates	Location	Teams Qualified			Semifinals Quotas	Semifinals Qualifiers
Dates	Location	Host	By Ranking	From Round 1	Semifinals Quotas	Semifinals Qualifiers
17–25 January 2015	Singapore	Singapore	Japan; Malaysia; Poland	Bangladesh; Mexico; Oman^{1} Ukraine^{1}	3	Malaysia; Poland; Japan
28 February – 8 March 2015	San Diego, United States	United States	Canada; Ireland	Austria; Chile; Italy; Russia; Trinidad and Tobago	3	Ireland; Austria; Canada
7–15 March 2015	Cape Town, South Africa	South Africa	China; France	Azerbaijan; Belarus; Czech Republic; Egypt; Switzerland	3	France; China; Egypt

^1 – Fiji and Sri Lanka withdrew from participating and Oman and Ukraine took their place.

=== Semifinals ===
Dates	Location	Teams Qualified			Final Quotas	Final Qualifiers
Dates	Location	Host	By Ranking	From Round 2	Final Quotas	Final Qualifiers
3–14 June 2015	Buenos Aires, Argentina	Argentina	Germany; Netherlands; New Zealand; South Korea; Spain	Austria; Canada; Egypt; Japan	4	Germany; Argentina; Netherlands; Canada
20 June–5 July 2015	Antwerp, Belgium	Belgium	Australia; Great Britain; India; Pakistan	China; France; Ireland; Malaysia; Poland	3	Australia; Belgium; Great Britain

=== Final ===
Dates	Location	Teams Qualified	
Dates	Location	Host	From Semifinals
28 November–6 December 2015	Raipur, India	India	Argentina; Australia; Belgium; Canada; Germany; Great Britain; Netherlands

== Final ranking ==
FIH issued a final ranking to determine the world ranking. The final ranking was as follows:

1. Australia
2. Belgium
3. India
4. Netherlands
5. Argentina
6. Great Britain
7. Germany
8. Canada
9. Ireland
10. Spain
11. New Zealand
12. Malaysia
13. South Korea
14. France
15. Pakistan
16. Japan
17. Poland
18. Egypt
19. Austria
20. China
21. Russia
22. South Africa
23. Oman
24. Ukraine
25. Switzerland
26. Chile
27. Czech Republic
28. Bangladesh
29. Italy
30. United States
31. Azerbaijan
32. Singapore
33. Belarus
34. Trinidad and Tobago
35. Mexico
