= Czech Republic men's national field hockey team =

Czech Republic
- Association: Czech Hockey Federation (Český Svaz Pozemního Hokeje)
- Confederation: EHF (Europe)
- Head Coach: Mirek Ludvik
- Assistant coach(es): Ales Perinka
- Manager: Nikola Mladkova
- Captain: Martin Hanus
Home	Away

FIH ranking
- Current: 31 ▲1 (18 June 2026)
- Highest: 20 (2014)
- Lowest: 37 (2003–2004)

EuroHockey Championship
- Appearances: 2 (first in 2007)
- Best result: 8th (2007, 2013)

The Czech Republic men's national field hockey team represents the Czech Republic in international field hockey competitions and is controlled by the Czech Hockey Federation, the governing body for field hockey in the Czech Republic.

== Tournament record ==
The Czech Republic has never qualified for the World Cup or the Summer Olympics. They competed two times in the EuroHockey Championship where their best result was the eighth place in 2007 and 2013.

=== European Championships ===
EuroHockey Championship record
Year	Host	Position	Pld	W	D	L	GF	GA	Squad
1970 to 1991		part of Czechoslovakia							
1995 to 2005		did not qualify							
2007	Manchester, England	8th	5	0	0	5	0	31	Squad
2009	Amstelveen, Netherlands	did not qualify							
2011	Mönchengladbach, Germany	did not qualify							
2013	Boom, Belgium	8th	5	0	1	4	5	20	Squad
2015 to 2025		did not qualify							
2027	London, England	to be determined							
Total		8th place	10	0	1	9	5	51	

=== EuroHockey Championship II ===
EuroHockey Championship II record
Year	Host	Position	Pld	W	D	L	GF	GA
2005	Rome, Italy	2nd	5	3	0	2	12	8
2007	Lisbon, Portugal	played in the Championship I						
2009	Wrexham, Wales	4th	5	1	2	2	9	13
2011	Vinnytsia, Ukraine	1st	5	3	1	1	12	5
2013	Vienna, Austria	played in the Championship I						
2015	Prague, Czech Republic	4th	5	2	0	3	7	10
2017	Glasgow, Scotland	6th	5	1	2	2	6	7
2019	Cambrai, France	7th	5	0	3	2	3	15
2021	Gniezno, Poland	played in the Championship III						
2023	(Republic of Ireland) Dublin, Ireland	5th	5	2	1	2	14	20
2025	Lousada, Portugal	5th	5	2	1	2	11	11
Total		1st place	40	14	10	16	74	89

=== Hockey World League ===
Hockey World League record
Season	Position	Round	Pld	W	D*	L	GF	GA
2012–13	30th of 33	Round1	3	0	1	2	6	8
2012–13	30th of 33	Round 2	5	0	0	5	7	19
2014–15	27th of 35	Round 1	4	3	0	1	21	6
2014–15	27th of 35	Round 2	6	2	1	3	13	15
2016–17	Unranked	Round 1	5	2	0	3	26	10
Total	27th (1x)	3/3	23	7	2	14	73	58

*Draws include knockout matches decided on a penalty shoot-out.

=== Hockey Series ===
FIH Hockey Series record
Season	Round	Pld	W	D*	L	GF	GA
2018–19	Open	5	2	0	3	20	15
Total	Open (1x)	5	2	0	3	20	15

== Results and fixtures ==
The following is a list of match results in the last 12 months, as well as any future matches that have been scheduled.

Win Draw Loss Fixture

=== 2026 ===
9 July 2026 EU Championship Qualifiers QF	Czech Republic	3–3 (2–3 p)	Portugal	Rome, Italy
16:15	Lupač 23'; Plachý 28'; Homolka 43'	Report	Rodrigues 2', 33'; Ventosa 49'
	Penalties
	Homolka (penalty shoot-out scored); J. Toms (penalty shoot-out scored); Plochý (penalty shoot-out missed); F. Toms (penalty shoot-out missed); Klaban (penalty shoot-out missed)		(penalty shoot-out missed) Rodrigues; (penalty shoot-out scored) Castro; (penalty shoot-out scored) Gomes; (penalty shoot-out scored) Franco

11 July 2026 EU Championship Qualifiers 5/8 Classification	Czech Republic	7–2	Ukraine	Rome, Italy
12:15	Plochý 18', 35', 38', 42'; J. Toms 23'; Homolka 41'; Lalík 56'	Report	Shevchuk 24'; Onofriiuk 32'

12 July 2026 EU Championship Qualifiers 5/6 Classification	Switzerland	2–2 (4–3 p)	Czech Republic	Rome, Italy
11:30	Hengartner 8'; Grandchamp 43'	Report	Lupač 28'; F. Toms 42'
	Penalties
	Grandchamp (penalty shoot-out scored); Flück (penalty shoot-out scored); Fischbach (penalty shoot-out missed); Kraxner (penalty shoot-out scored); Conrad (penalty shoot-out missed); Grandchamp (penalty shoot-out missed); Flück (penalty shoot-out scored)		(penalty shoot-out scored) Homolka; (penalty shoot-out missed) J. Toms; (penalty shoot-out missed) Šmíd; (penalty shoot-out scored) Klaban; (penalty shoot-out scored) Hes; (penalty shoot-out missed) Homolka; (penalty shoot-out missed) Klaban

== See also ==
- Czech Republic women's national field hockey team
- Czechoslovakia men's national field hockey team
