= Simon Martin-Brisac =

Uruguayan field and indoor hockey player

Personal information
- Born: 20 November 1992 (age 33) France
- Height: 175 cm (5 ft 9 in)
- Weight: 72 kg (159 lb)

Sport
- Sport: Field hockey
- Position: Forward
- Club: Racing Club de France
National team
Years	Team	Caps	Goals
2012–2013	France U–21	12	(5)
2012–	France	119	(29)
Medal record
Representing France
Men's field hockey
Junior World Cup
Silver medal – second place	2013 New Delhi

Simon Humphrey Gaspard Martin-Brisac (born 20 November 1992) is a field hockey player from France.

== Career ==
=== Under–21 ===
Simon Martin-Brisac debuted for the France U–21 team in 2012 at the EuroHockey Junior Championship in 's-Hertogenbosch.

The following year he went on to represent the team at the FIH Junior World Cup in New Delhi. At the tournament he won a silver medal, a history making performance for the French team.

=== Senior national team ===
Martin-Brisac made his debut for the French national team in 2012.

Since his debut, Martin-Brisac has been a regular fixture in the national squad. He won his first major medal with the senior team in 2019 at the FIH Series Finals in Le Touquet, taking home a gold medal.
