= Ross Stott =

Scottish field hockey player (born 1988)

Personal information
- Born: 6 January 1988 (age 38) Dundee, Scotland
- Height: 1.72 m (5 ft 8 in)
- Weight: 66 kg (146 lb)

Sport
- Sport: Field hockey
- Position: Midfield
Senior career
Years	Team	Caps	Goals
–	Dundee Wanderers	-	-
–	Grove Menszieshill	-	-
–2010	Kelburne	-	-
2010–2011	Bowdon	-	-
2011–2026	East Grinstead	-	-
National team
Years	Team	Caps	Goals
2007–2016	Scotland	117	(6)
Medal record
Representing Scotland
European Championship II
Bronze medal – third place	2011 Vinnytsia	Team
Bronze medal – third place	2015 Prague	Team

Ross Stott (6 January 1988) is a former international field hockey player for Scotland.

== Biography ==
Stott was born in Dundee and plays as a midfielder. His brother Niall also played for Scotland, while his cousin, Craig Strachan, was a senior international. He started his career with Dundee Wanderers before Grove Menszieshill and then Kelburne.

Stott made his Scottish international debut against South Africa in 2007 and while with Kelburne, played at the 2010 Commonwealth Games in Delhi. After the Games Stott moved from to play in the Men's England Hockey League, joining Bowdon. He won a bronze medal with the Scotland team at the 2011 Men's EuroHockey Championship II in Vinnytsia, Ukraine.

Stott joined East Grinstead Hockey Club in the Premier Division for the 2011/12 season.

Stott represented Scotland in the 2014 Commonwealth Games in Glasgow and won a bronze medal with Scotland at the 2015 Men's EuroHockey Championship II in Prague.

Stott retired from international hockey during October 2016.

In 2024, Stott took the position of head of the Junior Indoor Programme at East Grinstead. He played for the first team during the 2025–26 season.
