= 1995 Men's EuroHockey Nations Championship =

Tournament details
- Host country: Ireland
- City: Dublin
- Dates: 16–27 August
- Teams: 12 (from 1 confederation)

Final positions
- Champions: Germany (4th title)
- Runner-up: Netherlands
- Third place: England

Tournament statistics
- Matches played: 42
- Goals scored: 163 (3.88 per match)
- Top scorer(s): (England) Calum Giles (9 goals)
- Best player: (Netherlands) Marc Delissen

The 1995 Men's EuroHockey Nations Championship was the seventh edition of the Men's EuroHockey Nations Championship, the quadrennial international men's field hockey championship of Europe organized by the European Hockey Federation. It was held in Dublin, Ireland from 16 to 27 August 1995.

The defending champions Germany won a record-extending fourth title by defeating the Netherlands 9–8 in penalty strokes after the match finished 2–2 after extra time. England won the bronze medal by defeating Belgium 2–1.

== Preliminary round ==
=== Pool A ===
Pos	Team	Pld	W	D	L	GF	GA	GD	Pts	Qualification
1	Netherlands	5	4	1	0	17	4	+13	9	Semi-finals
2	Belgium	5	3	2	0	11	6	+5	8	Semi-finals
3	Spain	5	3	1	1	11	6	+5	7	
4	Wales	5	1	1	3	4	9	−5	3	
5	France	5	0	2	3	5	13	−8	2	
6	Scotland	5	0	1	4	3	13	−10	1	

Source: TheSports.org

16 August 1995

Belgium	3–1	Wales

16 August 1995

Spain	3–1	France

16 August 1995

Netherlands	4–1	Scotland

17 August 1995

Spain	2–0	Wales

17 August 1995

Netherlands	6–1	France

18 August 1995

Belgium	3–1	Scotland

19 August 1995

Spain	1–3	Netherlands

19 August 1995

France	1–2	Belgium

19 August 1995

Wales	2–0	Scotland

21 August 1995

France	1–1	Scotland

21 August 1995

Wales	0–3	Netherlands

21 August 1995

Belgium	2–2	Spain

22 August 1995

Netherlands	1–1	Belgium

22 August 1995

Scotland	0–3	Spain

23 August 1995

France	1–1	Wales

=== Pool B ===
Pos	Team	Pld	W	D	L	GF	GA	GD	Pts	Qualification
1	Germany	5	4	0	1	23	3	+20	8	Semi-finals
2	England	5	3	2	0	15	8	+7	8	Semi-finals
3	Poland	5	2	1	2	8	11	−3	5	
4	Ireland (H)	5	1	2	2	5	7	−2	4	
5	Switzerland	5	1	1	3	8	19	−11	3	
6	Belarus	5	1	0	4	7	18	−11	2	

Source: TheSports.org
(H) Hosts

16 August 1995

Ireland	2–1	Belarus

17 August 1995

Poland	3–2	Switzerland

17 August 1995

England	3–2	Germany

18 August 1995

Belarus	0–9	Germany

18 August 1995

Ireland	1–2	Switzerland

18 August 1995

Poland	1–3	England

20 August 1995

Germany	3–0	Poland

20 August 1995

England	1–1	Ireland

20 August 1995

Belarus	4–0	Switzerland

21 August 1995

Germany	7–0	Switzerland

22 August 1995

England	4–0	Belarus

22 August 1995

Ireland	1–1	Poland

23 August 1995

Switzerland	4–4	England

23 August 1995

Poland	3–2	Belarus

23 August 1995

Germany	2–0	Ireland

== Classification round ==
=== Ninth to twelfth place classification ===
9–12th place semi-finals
26 August
France	2
Belarus	4
26 August
Switzerland	2
Scotland	3

Ninth place
27 August
Belarus	4
Scotland	2
Eleventh place
27 August
France	2 (4)
Switzerland (p.s.o.)	2 (5)

==== 9–12th place semi-finals ====
26 August 1995

France	2–4	Belarus

26 August 1995

Switzerland	2–3	Scotland

==== Eleventh place game ====
27 August 1995

France	2–2 (a.e.t.)	Switzerland
Penalties
	4–5

==== Ninth place game ====
27 August 1995

Belarus	4–2	Scotland

=== Fifth to eighth place classification ===
5–8th place semi-finals
25 August
Spain	1
Ireland	3
25 August
Poland	3
Wales	1

Fifth place
26 August
Ireland	4
Poland	3
Seventh place
26 August
Spain	1
Wales	2

==== 5–8th place semi-finals ====
25 August 1995

Spain	1–3	Ireland

25 August 1995

Poland	3–1	Wales

==== Seventh place game ====
26 August 1995

Spain	1–2	Wales

==== Fifth place game ====
26 August 1995

Ireland	4–3	Poland

=== First to fourth place classification ===
Semi-finals
25 August
Netherlands	2
England	1
25 August
Germany	4
Belgium	0

Final
27 August
Netherlands	2 (8)
Germany (p.s.o.)	2 (9)
Third place
27 August
England	2
Belgium	1

==== Semi-finals ====
25 August 1995

Netherlands	2–1	England

25 August 1995

Germany	4–0	Belgium

==== Third place game ====
27 August 1995

England	2–1	Belgium

==== Final ====
27 August 1995

Netherlands	2–2 (a.e.t.)	Germany
Penalties
	8–9

== Final standings ==
1. Germany
2. Netherlands
3. England
4. Belgium
5. Ireland
6. Poland
7. Wales
8. Spain
9. Belarus
10. Scotland
11. Switzerland
12. France

== See also ==
- 1995 Women's EuroHockey Nations Championship
