= Viktor Lockwood =

French field hockey player

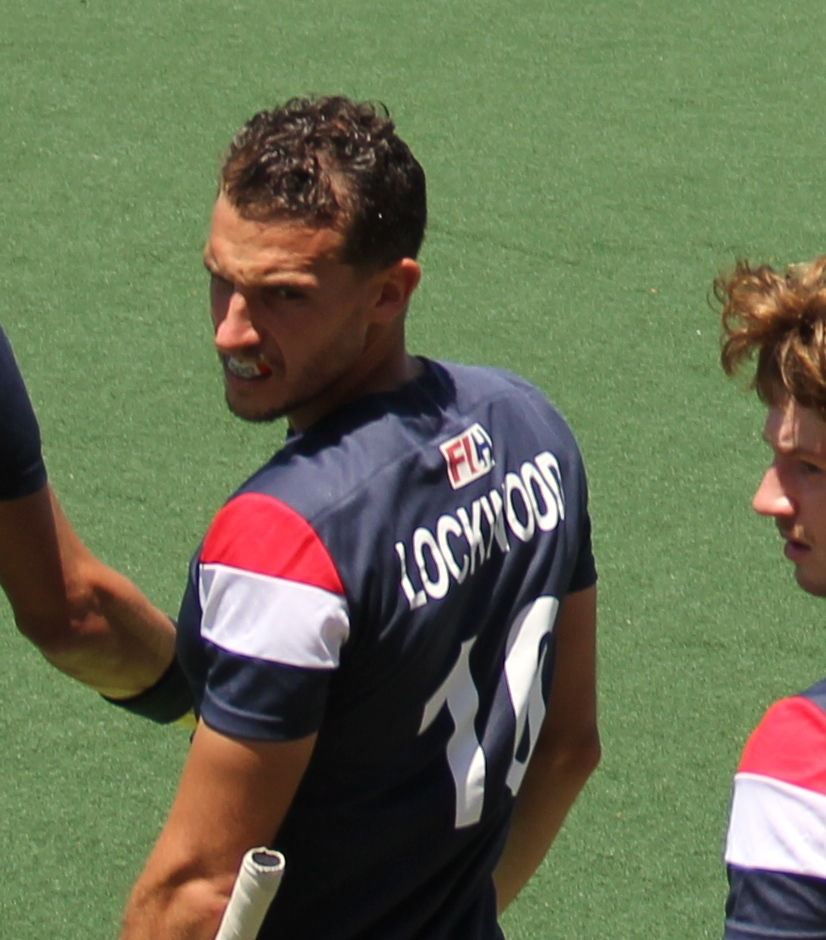
- Friendly Matches: India - France 2024

Personal information
- Full name: Viktor Stanley Lockwood
- Born: 29 March 1992 (age 34)

Sport
- Sport: Field hockey
- Position: Defender
- Club: Lille
Youth career
- Years: Team
- 2000–2004: Ronchin
- –: Lille
Senior career
Years	Team	Caps	Goals
–2014	Lille	-	-
2014–2016	Waterloo Ducks	-	-
2016–2017	Leuven	-	-
2017–2018	Gantoise	-	-
2018–2020	Orée	-	-
2020–present	Lille	-	-
National team
Years	Team	Caps	Goals
–	France	117	-
Medal record
Men's field hockey
Representing France
Junior World Cup
Silver medal – second place	2013 New Delhi
- Updated on 30 June 2020

Viktor Stanley Lockwood (born 29 March 1992) is a French field hockey player who plays as a defender for Lille and the French national team.

== Club career ==
Lockwood started playing hockey when he was eight years old for Rochin. He then played for Lille until 2014 when he joined the Waterloo Ducks in Belgium. After two seasons he left them for Leuven. He then played only one season for Leuven to join Gantoise in 2017. In 2018 he signed for Orée. After a decision from the club he had to leave Orée after the 2019–20 season. On 14 July it was announced he would return to Lille.

== International career ==
Lockwood was a part of the France under-21 squad which won the silver medal at the 2013 Junior World Cup. He represented France at the 2018 World Cup.
