= Russia men's national field hockey team =

Russia
- Association: Russian Field Hockey Federation
- Confederation: EHF (Europe)
- Head Coach: Vladimir Konkin
- Assistant coach(es): Andrey Kireev
- Manager: Sergey Medvedev; Mikhail Mokrushin
- Captain: Denis Shchipachev
Home	Away

FIH ranking
- Current: 28 ▲1 (4 October 2026)
- Highest: 19 (2013 – July 2015)
- Lowest: 45 (2007)

EuroHockey Championship
- Appearances: 5 (first in 1999)
- Best result: 7th (2011)

The Russia men's national field hockey team represents Russia in international field hockey competitions.

In response to the 2022 Russian invasion of Ukraine, the FIH banned Russia from the 2022 Women's FIH Hockey Junior World Cup, and banned Russian and Belarusian officials from FIH events. In addition, the European Hockey Federation banned the participation of all Russian athletes and officials from all events sanctioned by the Federation.

== Tournament record ==
Russia has never qualified for the World Cup or the Summer Olympics. They have competed four times in the EuroHockey Championship where their best result was the seventh place in 2011.

=== European Championships ===
EuroHockey Championship record
Year	Round	Position	Pld	W	D *	L	GF	GA
(Belgium) 1970	Part of the Soviet Union							
(Spain) 1974	Part of the Soviet Union							
(West Germany) 1978	Part of the Soviet Union							
(Netherlands) 1983	Part of the Soviet Union							
(Soviet Union) 1987	Part of the Soviet Union							
(France) 1991	Part of the Soviet Union							
(Republic of Ireland) 1995	did not qualify							
(Italy) 1999	7th place game	8th	7	3	0	4	18	27
(Spain) 2003	11th place game	12th	7	0	0	7	5	30
(Germany) 2005	did not qualify							
(England) 2007	did not qualify							
(Netherlands) 2009	did not qualify							
(Germany) 2011	Group stage	7th	5	1	0	4	8	29
(Belgium) 2013	did not qualify							
(England) 2015	Group stage	8th	5	0	0	5	7	42
(Netherlands) 2017	did not qualify							
(Belgium) 2019	did not qualify							
(Netherlands) 2021	Group stage	8th	5	0	1	4	11	28
(Germany) 2023	Suspended due to invasion of Ukraine							
(Germany) 2025	Suspended due to invasion of Ukraine							
Total	Best: 7th	5/12	29	4	1	24	49	156

EuroHockey Championships record
Year	Level	Position	Pld	W	D*	L	GF	GA	P/R
(Russia) 2007	III	1st	5	5	0	0	32	5	▲
(Wales) 2009	II	2nd	5	4	0	1	19	8	▲
(Austria) 2013	II	1st	5	4	1	0	18	5	▲
(Scotland) 2017	II	4th	5	1	2	2	13	14	Same position
(France) 2019	II	2nd	5	3	1	1	12	10	▲
(Republic of Ireland) 2023	II	Suspended due to invasion of Ukraine							
Total	Highest: 1st		25	17	4	4	94	42	–

=== Hockey World League ===
Hockey World League record
Season	Position	Round	Pld	W	D *	L	GF	GA
2012–13	17th of 33	Round 2	5	4	0	1	17	10
2014–15	21st of 35	Round 1	4	4	0	0	38	0
2014–15	21st of 35	Round 2	6	3	2	1	16	11
2016–17	22nd of 36	Round 2	6	3	1	2	15	12
Total	17th (1x)	3/3	21	14	3	4	86	33

== Current squad ==
Squad for the 2021 Men's EuroHockey Nations Championship.

Head coach: Vladimir Konkin

No.	Pos.	Player	Date of birth (age)	Caps	Club
1	GK	Ivan Ozherelev	9 December 1995 (age 30)	8	
5		Mikhail Proskuriakov	20 September 1995 (age 31)	48	(Russia) Dinamo Elektrostal
7		Sergey Lepeshkin	27 July 1997 (age 29)	12	(Russia) Dinamo Elektrostal
8	FW	Georgii Arusiia	31 August 1999 (age 27)	18	(Russia) Dinamo Elektrostal
9	DF	Semen Matkovskiy	8 September 1992 (age 34)	57	(Russia) HK Dinamo Kazan
10	MF	Linar Fattakhov	8 July 1991 (age 35)	0	(Russia) HK Dinamo Kazan
11		Alexander Skiperskiy	20 November 1990 (age 35)	26	
12		Evgeny Artemov	29 September 1996 (age 30)	13	(Russia) Dinamo Elektrostal
14		Marat Khairullin	20 October 1993 (age 33)	34	(Russia) Dinamo Elektrostal
15		Pavel Golubev	18 April 1990 (age 36)	96	
17		Andrey Kuraev	26 March 1995 (age 31)	32	(Russia) Dinamo Elektrostal
19		Iaroslav Loginov	6 November 1987 (age 38)	138	(Russia) Dinamo Elektrostal
20		Artem Nadyrshin	19 January 1997 (age 29)	2	
22	GK	Marat Gafarov	11 August 1987 (age 39)	63	
24		Artem Borisov	2 October 1989 (age 37)	41	
25		Alexey Sobolevskiy	8 October 2001 (age 25)	13	
27		Denis Starienko	28 September 2001 (age 25)	12	
28		Ilfat Zamalutdinov	28 February 1992 (age 34)	51	

== See also ==
- Russia women's national field hockey team
- Soviet Union men's national field hockey team
