= Italy men's national field hockey team =

Italy
- Nickname(s): Gli Azzurri (The Blues)
- Association: Italian Hockey Federation
- Confederation: EHF (Europe)
- Head Coach: Gilles van Hesteren
- Assistant coach(es): Lorenzo Dussi
- Manager: Eleonora Rodo
- Captain: Agustin Nunez
Home	Away

FIH ranking
- Current: 27 (5 August 2026)
- Highest: 22 (June 2021–present)
- Lowest: 37 (2007, July 2018–December 2018)

Olympic Games
- Appearances: 2 (first in 1952)
- Best result: 11th (1952)

World Cup
- Appearances: 1 (first in 1978)
- Best result: 13th (1978)

EuroHockey Championship
- Appearances: 6 (first in 1970)
- Best result: 9th (1987)

The Italy men's national field hockey team represents Italy in international field hockey competitions.

== Tournament record ==
=== Summer Olympics ===
- 1952 – 11th place
- 1960 – 13th place

=== World Cup ===
- 1978 – 13th place

=== EuroHockey Championship ===
- 1970 – 13th place
- 1974 – 12th place
- 1987 – 9th place
- 1991 – 12th place
- 1999 – 12th place
- 2003 – 10th place
- 2027 – Qualified

=== EuroHockey Championship II ===
- 2005 – 5th place
- 2007 – 6th place
- 2009 – 7th place
- 2013 – 8th place
- 2019 – 5th place
- 2021 – 5th place
- 2023 – 4th place
- 2025 – 4th place

=== EuroHockey Championship III ===
- 2011 – (silver)
- 2015 – (bronze)
- 2017 – (silver)

=== Hockey World League ===
- 2012–13 – Round 1
- 2014–15 – 29th place
- 2016–17 – 31st place

=== FIH Hockey Series ===
- 2018–19 – Second round

== Results and fixtures ==
The following is a list of match results in the last 12 months, as well as any future matches that have been scheduled.

Win Draw Loss Fixture

=== 2026 ===
Test series

27 June 2026 Game 1	Switzerland	3–3	Italy	Luzern, Switzerland
11:30	Grandchamp 12', 42', 51'	Report	Arosio 4'; Frascino 24', 41'

28 June 2026 Game 2	Switzerland	0–5	Italy	Luzern, Switzerland
11:30		Report	Puglisi 7'; Arosio 20'; Giuliani 30'; Dionisi Vici 53'; Brocco 57'

2027 Men's EuroHockey Championship Qualifiers

9 July 2026 QF	Italy	6–2	Ukraine	Rome, Italy
18:30	Frascino 5', 45'; Harte 20'; Arosio 28'; Puglisi 55'; Giuliani 56'	Report	Koshelenko 2', 34'

10 July 2026 SF	Portugal	2–5	Italy	Rome, Italy
18:30	Castro 46'; Ventosa 51'	Report	Frascino 14'; Giuliani 23'; Brocco 43'; Puglisi 53'; Gencarelli 58'

12 July 2026 Final	Scotland	3–1	Italy	Rome, Italy
16:00	J. Golden 8'; Walker 33'; C. Golden 34'	Report	Brocco 10'

Test series

29 August 2026 Game 1	Italy	14–0	Malta	Rome, Italy
17:00	Muzzioli 7'; Faggian 8', 36', 58', 60'; L. Palumbo 12', 13'; Frascino 23', 25', 49'; Brocco 38', 41'; Biocca 55'; G. Palombi 59'	Report		Stadium: Olympic Center Giulio Onesti

30 August 2026 Game 2	Italy	12–0	Malta	Rome, Italy
11:00	Brocco 3', 40'; Dionisi Vici 9', 42', 60'; Giuliani 14', 56'; Biocca 19'; Frascino 22', 45'; Faggian 32', 51'	Report		Stadium: Olympic Center Giulio Onesti

== Players ==
=== Current squad ===
The following 18 players were named on 19 August 2022 for the 2022 EuroHockey Championship Qualifier in Vienna, Austria from 23 to 26 August 2022.

Caps updated as of 26 August 2022, after the match against Ukraine.

No.	Pos.	Player	Date of birth (age)	Caps	Club
1	GK	Francesco Mitrotta	11 February 1990 (age 36)	34	(Belgium) Pingouin
22	GK	Roberto Broere	27 May 1997 (age 29)	2	(Netherlands) Berkel en Rodenrijs
14	DF	Luca Valentino	9 June 1997 (age 29)	19	(Italy) Padova
18	DF	Thomas Keenan (Captain)	2 April 1994 (age 32)	67	(Spain) Atlético San Sebastián
19	DF	Valeriano Mardones	15 March 1991 (age 35)	5	(Spain) Taburiente
23	DF	Manuel Mondo	18 December 1998 (age 27)	19	(Belgium) Herakles
25	DF	Alberto Ughetto	6 July 1998 (age 28)	11	(Italy) Valchisone
4	MF	Marco Moretto	19 May 1995 (age 31)	3	(Belgium) White Star
8	MF	Davide Arosio	22 May 2001 (age 25)	16	(Italy) Butterfly Roma
20	MF	Juan Munafo	8 May 1999 (age 27)	21	(Spain) Sardinero
24	MF	Franco Caruso	5 May 2000 (age 26)	6	(Italy) Citta del Tricolore
27	MF	Facundo Harte	22 March 1996 (age 30)	16	(Spain) Tenis
32	MF	Mattia Amorosini	24 March 1999 (age 27)	51	(Netherlands) SCHC
11	FW	Claudio Brocco	26 December 2001 (age 24)	17	(Italy) Lazio
15	FW	Gonzalo Ursone	8 November 1988 (age 37)	35	(Italy) Paolo Bonomi
21	FW	Francois Sior	21 July 1998 (age 28)	31	(Belgium) Leuven
26	FW	Felix Dionisi Vici	4 October 2003 (age 22)	3	(Italy) Tevere
30	FW	Franco Quiroga	23 September 1999 (age 26)	10	(Spain) Taburiente

=== Recent call-ups ===
The following players have been selected in the past 12 months and are still eligible to represent.

Pos.	Player	Date of birth (age)	Caps	Club	Latest call-up
GK	Francesco Padovani	7 November 1994 (age 31)	51	(Italy) Bra	2021 European World Cup Qualifier
DF	Simone Minetto	19 November 1999 (age 26)	14	(Italy) Valchisone	v. Ireland, 12 June 2022
DF	Juan Montone	18 November 1986 (age 39)	59	(Belgium) Indiana	2021 European World Cup Qualifier
DF	Nicolas Mondo	27 August 1996 (age 30)	32	(Belgium) Mechelse	2021 European World Cup Qualifier
MF	Lucas Stramazzo	12 April 1995 (age 31)	16	(Spain) Taburiente	v. Ireland, 12 June 2022
MF	Geronimo Clement	2 November 1994 (age 31)	6	(Belgium) Namur	v. Ireland, 12 June 2022
MF	Giulio Ferrini	26 February 1992 (age 34)	32	(England) Southgate	2021 European World Cup Qualifier
MF	Marco Garbaccio	10 July 1998 (age 28)	29	(Italy) Bra	2021 European World Cup Qualifier
MF	Matthias Malucchi	12 March 1998 (age 28)	9	(Italy) Pisa	2021 European World Cup Qualifier
FW	Santiago Puglisi	15 June 2001 (age 25)	2	(Italy) Bologna	v. Ireland, 12 June 2022
FW	Agustin Nunez	16 October 1985 (age 40)	90	(Belgium) Mechelse	2021 European World Cup Qualifier
FW	Julian Montone	16 June 1990 (age 36)	48	(Belgium) Pingouin	2021 European World Cup Qualifier

== See also ==
- Italy women's national field hockey team
