= 2025–26 Men's FIH Hockey Nations Cup =

Hockey tournament in South Africa

Tournament details
- Host country: South Africa
- City: Cape Town
- Dates: 11–20 June
- Teams: 9 (from 4 confederations)
- Venue: Hartleyvale Stadium

Final positions
- Champions: France (1st title)
- Runner-up: South Africa
- Third place: New Zealand

Tournament statistics
- Matches played: 24
- Goals scored: 116 (4.83 per match)
- Top scorer: (France) Victor Charlet (8 goals)
- Best player: (France) Corentin Sellier
- Best young player: (France) Malo Martinache
- Best goalkeeper: (South Africa) Cullin de Jager

The 2025–26 Men's FIH Hockey Nations Cup was the fourth edition of the Men's FIH Hockey Nations Cup, the annual qualification tournament for the Men's FIH Pro League organised by the International Hockey Federation. The tournament was held at the Hartleyvale Stadium in Cape Town, South Africa from 11 to 20 June 2026.

France won their first title with a finals win over South Africa. New Zealand won the bronze medal by defeating Japan 3–1.

== Qualified teams ==
In addition to the host nation, teams qualified for the event through three pathways, the 2024–25 editions of the FIH Pro League, Nations Cup and Nations Cup 2.

| Dates | Event | Location | Quotas | Qualifiers |
|---|---|---|---|---|
| 30 November 2024 – 29 June 2025 | 2024–25 FIH Pro League | Various | 1 | Ireland |
| 17–23 February 2025 | FIH Nations Cup 2 | Muscat, Oman | 2 | Scotland; United States^{A} |
| 15–21 June 2025 | FIH Nations Cup | Kuala Lumpur, Malaysia | 5 | France; Japan; Malaysia; New Zealand; South Korea; ~~Wales~~^{A} |
| 16 March 2026 | Host Nation | | 1 | South Africa |
| Total | | | 9 | |

^A – Wales withdrew and were replaced by United States to the 2025–26 Men's FIH Hockey Nations Cup.

== Squads ==
France

Head Coach: (Belgium) John-John Dohmen

3. Mattéo Desgouillons
4. Brieuc Delemazure
6. Corentin Sellier
8. Xavier Esmenjaud
9. Mathis Clément
11. Noé Jouin
12. Gaspard Xavier
13. Benjamin Marqué
14. Malo Martinache
15. Gaspard Denis
16. François Goyet (C)
18. Eliot Curty
21. Etienne Tynevez
22. Aristide Michaelis
22. Victor Charlet
23. Marius Clément (GK)
24. Amaury Bellenger
28. Timothée Clément
31. Corentin Saunier (GK)
95. Louis Haertelmeyer
Ireland

Head Coach: Mark Tumilty

9. Matthew Nelson
10. Daragh Walsh
15. Kyle Marshall (C)
19. Peter McKibbin
20. Jeremy Duncan
21. James Milliken (GK)
24. Benjamin Walker
26. Peter Brown
28. Ben Nelson
29. Lee Cole
33. Evan Jennings
36. Sam Hyland
39. Fergus Gibson
40. Ben Johnson
41. Benjamin Ryder
43. Luke Roleston (GK)
45. Nicholas Page
46. Gregory Williams
47. Adam McAllister
49. Alistair Empey
Japan

Head Coach: Yoshihiro Anai

1. Koji Yamasaki
2. Shota Yamada
5. Seren Tanaka
6. Naru Kimura
7. Jun Watanabe
8. Taiki Takade
9. Kosei Kawabe
11. Kazumasa Matsumoto
12. Yuma Nagai
13. Manabu Yamashita
14. Raiki Fujishima (C)
16. Hiro Saito
18. Tsubasa Tanaka
19. Ryoma Ooka
21. Kazuki Nakai
22. Kaito Tanaka
23. Yusuke Kawamura
29. Takumi Kitagawa (GK)
30. Takashi Yoshikawa (GK)
38. Hyota Yamada
Malaysia

Head Coach: (South Africa) Brendon Carolan

1. Syed Cholan
5. Addy Jamlus
6. Marhan Jalil (C)
7. Fitri Saari
8. Syarman Mat
10. Faizal Saari
11. Akhimullah Anuar
12. Adam Johari
15. Shello Silverius
16. Zaimi Mat Deris (GK)
18. Faiz Jali
20. Ashran Hamsani
21. Hafizuddin Othman (GK)
22. Norsyafiq Sumantri
23. Abu Kamal Azrai
24. Aiman Rozemi
26. Muhajir Abdu Rauf
30. Faris Harizan
31. Azimuddin Kamaruddin
35. Andywalfian Jeffrynus
New Zealand

Head Coach: (South Africa) Greg Nicol

1. Dominic Dixon (GK)
2. Scott Boyde
4. Dane Lett
8. Charlie Morrison
12. Samuel Lane (C)
16. Aidan Sarikaya
17. Nicholas Woods
21. Kane Russell
23. Dylan Thomas
25. Bradley Rothwell
30. Finn Ward
32. George Baker
33. Jonty Elmes
34. Malachi Buschl
35. Ryan Parr
37. Isaac Houlbrooke
38. Benjamin Culhane
39. James Hickson
40. Matthew Reutsch (GK)
41. Timothy Neild
Scotland

Head Coach: Neil Allan

1. Tommy Alexander (GK)
2. Ollie Wilson
3. Andrew McAllister
6. Ali Douglas
7. Jacob Tweedie
8. Rob Field (C)
9. Andrew McConnell
13. Struan Walker
18. Euan Gilmour
20. Jamie Golden
21. David Nairn
22. Calum Douglas (GK)
24. Jamie Croll
29. Keir Robb
30. Thomas Austin
32. Callum Mackenzie
34. Alasdair Richmond
36. Iain McFadden
39. Cameron Golden
40. Jedd Campbell
South Africa

Head Coach: Devon van der Merwe

2. Mustapha Cassiem
3. Andrew Hobson
4. Calvin Davis
5. Senzwesihle Ngubane
6. Jamie Seale
7. Dayaan Cassiem (C)
8. Nduduzo Lembethe
9. Jared Cass
10. Hans Neethling
11. Tevin Kok
13. Tevin Petersen
15. Carlon Mentoor
17. Brendan du Toit (GK)
20. Luke Wynford
21. Ayakha Mthalane
23. Nicholas Spooner
27. Niel Raath
29. Samkelo Mvimbi
30. Cullin de Jager (GK)
47. Kenton Melville
South Korea

Head Coach: Min Tae-seok

1. Kim Jae-hyeon (GK)
3. Jeong Jun-seong
6. Yang Ji-hun (C)
7. Sim Jae-won
8. Rim Jin-kang
10. Kim Yong-Bok
12. Lee Gang-san
15. Lim Do-hyun
16. Moon Eun-taek (GK)
17. Oh Se-yong
18. Kong Yoon-ho
19. Son Da-in
22. Lee Chang-min
23. Kim Hyeong-jin
24. Bae Soung
25. Jang Jong-hyun
28. Kim Hyeon-hong
33. Cho Ghu-hyeong
49. Choi Chan-kyu
77. Park Cheoleon
United States

Head Coach: Allan Law

2. Sekayi Charasika
5. Patrick Harris
8. Jatin Sharma
10. Alberto Montilla
11. Marius Leser
12. Ajai Dhadwal (C)
14. Aki Käppeler
15. Kei Käppeler
17. Christian DeAngelis
21. Henzor Motta
22. Jonathan Orozco
23. Kai Kokolakis
29. Emil Collins (GK)
30. Michael Mendoza
31. Liam Hawley
32. Allard André de la Porte (GK)
33. Jack Heldens
34. Wyatt Katz
36. Doug Allison
37. Gary Johal

== Preliminary round ==
All times are local (UTC+2).

=== Pool A ===
| Pos | Team | Pld | W | D | L | GF | GA | GD | Pts | Qualification |
|---|---|---|---|---|---|---|---|---|---|---|
| 1 | New Zealand | 4 | 4 | 0 | 0 | 17 | 5 | +12 | 12 | Semi-finals |
| 2 | Japan | 4 | 2 | 1 | 1 | 8 | 7 | +1 | 7 | Semi-finals |
| 3 | Malaysia | 4 | 2 | 0 | 2 | 9 | 12 | −3 | 6 | 5–8th classification |
| 4 | Scotland | 4 | 1 | 0 | 3 | 6 | 9 | −3 | 3 | 5–8th classification |
| 5 | South Korea | 4 | 0 | 1 | 3 | 6 | 13 | −7 | 1 | |

Source: FIH
Rules for classification: 1) points; 2) matches won; 3) goal difference; 4) goals for; 5) head-to-head result; 6) field goals scored.

11 June 2026
12:15

| Malaysia | 5–2 | Scotland |
|---|---|---|
| Akhimullah 11'; Azrai 34', 49', 59'; Rozemi 42' | Report | J. Golden 40'; McConnell 57' |

Umpires:
Peter Kabaso (KEN)
Rob Argent (IRL)

11 June 2026
14:30

| South Korea | 1–1 | Japan |
|---|---|---|
| Lim 27' | Report | T. Tanaka 37' |

Umpires:
Sébastien Michielsen (BEL)
Kamilė Mockaitytė (LTU)

12 June 2026
16:45

| Malaysia | 1–4 | Japan |
|---|---|---|
| Saari 4' | Report | Yamada 26'; Matsumoto 29'; T. Tanaka 50'; Fujishima 55' |

Umpires:
Alex Miles (CAN)
Munashe Mashoko (ZIM)

12 June 2026
19:00

| New Zealand | 1–0 | Scotland |
|---|---|---|
| Thomas 54' | Report |

Umpires:
Chad Fourie (RSA)
Rob Argent (IRL)

14 June 2026
14:45

| Japan | 1–0 | Scotland |
|---|---|---|
| Yamasaki 43' | Report |

Umpires:
Chad Fourie (RSA)
Peter Kabaso (KEN)

14 June 2026
17:00

| South Korea | 2–6 | New Zealand |
|---|---|---|
| Lim 12'; Jang 44' | Report | Russell 31', 52'; Boyde 34'; Thomas 47', 59'; Culhane 55' |

Umpires:
Sébastien Michielsen (BEL)
Munashe Mashoko (ZIM)

16 June 2026
12:15

| Malaysia | 1–5 | New Zealand |
|---|---|---|
| Akhimullah 56' | Report | Russell 18', 25'; Thomas 20'; Houlbrooke 42'; Elmes 51' |

Umpires:
Alex Miles (CAN)
Jake Charles (ENG)

16 June 2026
14:30

| Scotland | 4–2 | South Korea |
|---|---|---|
| J. Golden 5', 41'; Gilmour 34'; C. Golden 55' | Report | Lee G. 20'; Park 59' |

Umpires:
Peter Kabaso (KEN)
Kamilė Mockaitytė (LTU)

17 June 2026
16:45

| South Korea | 1–2 | Malaysia |
|---|---|---|
| Lee G. 20' | Report | Akhimullah 5'; Silverius 58' |

Umpires:
Chad Fourie (RSA)
Ayanna McClean (TTO)

17 June 2026
19:00

| New Zealand | 5–2 | Japan |
|---|---|---|
| Russell 13', 28'; Boyde 29', 56'; Lane 31' | Report | Watanabe 45'; Matsumoto 46' |

Umpires:
Kamilė Mockaitytė (LTU)
Munashe Mashoko (ZIM)

=== Pool B ===
| Pos | Team | Pld | W | D | L | GF | GA | GD | Pts | Qualification |
|---|---|---|---|---|---|---|---|---|---|---|
| 1 | France | 3 | 3 | 0 | 0 | 10 | 3 | +7 | 9 | Semi-finals |
| 2 | South Africa (H) | 3 | 1 | 1 | 1 | 9 | 7 | +2 | 4 | Semi-finals |
| 3 | Ireland | 3 | 1 | 1 | 1 | 6 | 5 | +1 | 4 | 5–8th classification |
| 4 | United States | 3 | 0 | 0 | 3 | 1 | 11 | −10 | 0 | 5–8th classification |

Source: FIH
Rules for classification: 1) points; 2) matches won; 3) goal difference; 4) goals for; 5) head-to-head result; 6) field goals scored.
(H) Hosts

11 June 2026
16:45

| Ireland | 3–0 | United States |
|---|---|---|
| Johnson 17'; Williams 28'; Gibson 48' | Report |

Umpires:
Jake Charles (ENG)
Aziz Adimah (GHA)

11 June 2026
19:00

| France | 4–2 | South Africa |
|---|---|---|
| Sellier 11'; Charlet 36', 53', 60' | Report | Melville 13'; Mentoor 20' |

Umpires:
Ayanna McClean (TTO)
Alex Miles (CAN)

13 June 2026
14:45

| Ireland | 0–2 | France |
|---|---|---|
| | Report | Esmenjaud 25'; Clément 35' |

Umpires:
Jake Charles (ENG)
Ayanna McClean (TTO)

13 June 2026
17:00

| South Africa | 4–0 | United States |
|---|---|---|
| Davis 13'; Mthalane 36', 53'; Melville 59' | Report |

Umpires:
Kamilė Mockaitytė (LTU)
Aziz Adimah (GHA)

16 June 2026
16:45

| France | 4–1 | United States |
|---|---|---|
| Esmenjaud 12'; Charlet 33', 35', 57' | Report | Charasika 14' |

Umpires:
Rob Argent (IRL)
Ayanna McClean (TTO)

16 June 2026
19:00

| South Africa | 3–3 | Ireland |
|---|---|---|
| Melville 24'; Mentoor 35'; Davis 57' | Report | Walsh 4'; Nelson 48', 60' |

Umpires:
Sébastien Michielsen (BEL)
Aziz Adimah (GHA)

== Fifth to eighth place Classification ==
=== Bracket ===
Semi-finals
19 June
Malaysia | 4
United States | 2
19 June
Ireland | 4 (7)
Scotland (p.s.o.) | 4 (8)

Fifth place
20 June
Malaysia | 4
Scotland | 2
Seventh place
20 June
United States | 1
Ireland | 5

=== 5–8th place semi-finals ===
19 June 2026
12:15

| Malaysia | 4–2 | United States |
|---|---|---|
| Akhimullah 33'; Azrai 39'; Saari 52'; Harizan 55' | Report | Charasika 5'; Montilla 17' |

Umpires:
Jake Charles (ENG)
Aziz Adimah (GHA)

19 June 2026
14:30

| Ireland | 4–4 | Scotland |
|---|---|---|
| Nelson 40', 55'; Hyland 57'; Duncan 59' | Report | Tweedie 28'; J. Golden 35', 43', 60' |
Penalties
| Walsh (penalty shoot-out missed); G. Williams (penalty shoot-out scored); Nelson (penalty shoot-out scored); B. Walker (penalty shoot-out missed); Marshall (penalty shoot-out missed); G. Williams (penalty shoot-out scored); Nelson (penalty shoot-out scored); Walsh (penalty shoot-out missed); B. Walker (penalty shoot-out scored); Marshall (penalty shoot-out scored); G. Williams (penalty shoot-out scored); Nelson (penalty shoot-out missed) | 7–8 | (penalty shoot-out missed) S. Walker; (penalty shoot-out missed) Austin; (penalty shoot-out scored) J. Golden; (penalty shoot-out missed) C. Golden; (penalty shoot-out scored) Field; (penalty shoot-out scored) Austin; (penalty shoot-out scored) S. Walker; (penalty shoot-out missed) C. Golden; (penalty shoot-out scored) J. Golden; (penalty shoot-out scored) Field; (penalty shoot-out scored) Austin; (penalty shoot-out scored) S. Walker |

Umpires:
Chad Fourie (RSA)
Alex Miles (CAN)

=== Seventh place game ===
20 June 2026
12:15

| United States | 1–5 | Ireland |
|---|---|---|
| Charasika 29' | Report | B. Nelson 12', 28'; Empey 20'; G. Williams 44'; M. Nelson 58' |

Umpires:
Peter Kabaso (KEN)
Alex Miles (CAN)

=== Fifth place game ===
20 June 2026
14:30

| Malaysia | 4–2 | Scotland |
|---|---|---|
| Saari 8'; Azrai 19', 50'; Akhimullah 45' | Report | Golden 32'; Nairn 44' |

Umpires:
Ayanna McClean (TTO)
Chad Fourie (RSA)

== First to fourth place Classification ==
=== Bracket ===
Semi-finals
19 June
New Zealand | 2 (0)
South Africa (p.s.o.) | 2 (2)
19 June
France | 4
Japan | 3

Final
20 June
South Africa | 1
France | 2
Third place
20 June
New Zealand | 3
Japan | 1

=== Semi-finals ===
19 June 2026
16:45

| France | 4–3 | Japan |
|---|---|---|
| Charlet 7'; Esmenjaud 11'; Clément 28'; Sellier 53' | Report | Ooka 5'; S. Yamada 8'; H. Yamada 22' |

Umpires:
Rob Argent (IRL)
Munashe Mashoko (ZIM)

19 June 2026
19:00

| New Zealand | 2–2 | South Africa |
|---|---|---|
| Russell 12'; Ward 55' | Report | Davis 27'; Melville 32' |
Penalties
| Lane (penalty shoot-out missed); Thomas (penalty shoot-out missed); Woods (penalty shoot-out missed); Baker (penalty shoot-out missed) | 0–2 | (penalty shoot-out missed) D. Cassiem; (penalty shoot-out scored) Neethling; (penalty shoot-out scored) Raath |

Umpires:
Sébastien Michielsen (BEL)
Kamilė Mockaitytė (LTU)

=== Third place game ===
20 June 2026
16:45

| New Zealand | 3–1 | Japan |
|---|---|---|
| Lane 27'; Elmes 56'; Hickson 57' | Report | Tanaka 4' |

Umpires:
Munashe Mashoko (ZIM)
Kamilė Mockaitytė (LTU)

=== Final ===
20 June 2026
19:00

| South Africa | 1–2 | France |
|---|---|---|
| Mvimbi 48' | Report | Charlet 4'; Tynevez 8' |

Umpires:
Sébastien Michielsen (BEL)
Rob Argent (IRL)

== Statistics ==
=== Final standings ===
| Pos | Team | Promotion |
|---|---|---|
| 1st place, gold medalist(s) | France | Promoted to the 2026–27 Pro League |
| 2nd place, silver medalist(s) | South Africa (H) | |
| 3rd place, bronze medalist(s) | New Zealand | |
| 4 | Japan | |
| 5 | Malaysia | |
| 6 | Scotland | |
| 7 | Ireland | |
| 8 | United States | |
| 9 | South Korea | |

Source: FIH
(H) Host

=== Awards ===
The awards were announced on 20 June 2026.

| Award | Player |
|---|---|
| Player of the tournament | (France) Corentin Sellier |
| Goalkeeper of the tournament | (South Africa) Cullin de Jager |
| Best young player | (France) Malo Martinache |

=== Goalscorers ===
There were 116 goals scored in 24 matches, for an average of 4.83 goals per match.

8 goals

- (France) Victor Charlet

7 goals

- (New Zealand) Kane Russell
- (Scotland) Jamie Golden

6 goals

- (Malaysia) Abu Kamal Azrai

5 goals

- (Malaysia) Akhimullah Anuar

4 goals

- (Ireland) Ben Nelson
- (New Zealand) Dylan Thomas
- (South Africa) Kenton Melville

3 goals

- (France) Xavier Esmenjaud
- (Ireland) Matthew Nelson
- (Japan) Tsubasa Tanaka
- (Malaysia) Faizal Saari
- (New Zealand) Scott Boyde
- (South Africa) Calvin Davis
- (United States) Sekayi Charasika

2 goals

- (France) Timothée Clément
- (France) Corentin Sellier
- (Ireland) Gregory Williams
- (Japan) Kazumasa Matsumoto
- (Japan) Hyota Yamada
- (New Zealand) Jonty Elmes
- (New Zealand) Sam Lane
- (South Africa) Carlon Mentoor
- (South Africa) Ayakha Mthalane
- (South Korea) Lee Gang-san
- (South Korea) Lim Do-hyun

1 goal

- (France) Etienne Tynevez
- (Ireland) Fergus Gibson
- (Ireland) Ben Johnson
- (Ireland) Daragh Walsh
- (Ireland) Jeremy Duncan
- (Ireland) Alistair Empey
- (Ireland) Sam Hyland
- (Japan) Raiki Fujishima
- (Japan) Ryoma Ooka
- (Japan) Jun Watanabe
- (Japan) Shota Yamada
- (Japan) Koji Yamasaki
- (Malaysia) Faris Harizan
- (Malaysia) Aiman Rozemi
- (Malaysia) Shello Silverius
- (New Zealand) Benjamin Culhane
- (New Zealand) James Hickson
- (New Zealand) Isaac Houlbrooke
- (New Zealand) Finn Ward
- (Scotland) Euan Gilmour
- (Scotland) Cameron Golden
- (Scotland) Andrew McConnell
- (Scotland) David Nairn
- (Scotland) Jacob Tweedie
- (South Africa) Samkelo Mvimbi
- (South Korea) Jang Jong-hyun
- (South Korea) Park Cheoleon
- (United States) Alberto Montilla

Source: FIH

== See also ==
- 2025–26 Women's FIH Hockey Nations Cup
- 2025–26 Men's FIH Pro League
