= Malaysia men's national field hockey team =

Malaysia
- Nickname(s): Malaysian Hockey Tigers (Speedy Tigers)
- Association: Malaysian Hockey Confederation (Konfederasi Hoki Malaysia)
- Confederation: AHF (Asia)
- Head Coach: Brendon Carolan
- Assistant coach(es): Sohail Abbas; Kevan Demartinis; Kumar Subramaniam
- Captain: Marhan Jalil
- Most caps: Kuhan Shanmuganathan (341)
- Top scorer: Razie Rahim (107)
Home	Away

FIH ranking
- Current: 14 ▲1 (6 November 2026)
- Highest: 9 (2023)
- Lowest: 15 (2008–2010, June 2025)

Olympic Games
- Appearances: 9 (first in 1956)
- Best result: 8th (1972)

World Cup
- Appearances: 10 (first in 1973)
- Best result: 4th (1975)

Asian Games
- Appearances: 18 (first in 1958)
- Best result: (silver) (2010, 2018, 2026)

Asia Cup
- Appearances: 12 (first in 1982)
- Best result: (silver) (2017, 2022)
Medal record
Event	1st	2nd	3rd
Asian Games	0	3	6
Asia Cup	0	2	2
Asian Champions Trophy	0	1	6
Commonwealth Games	0	1	1
Sultan Azlan Shah Cup	1	5	2
Total	1	12	17
Asian Games
Silver medal – second place	2010 Guangzhou	Team
Silver medal – second place	2018 Jakarta-Palembang	Team
Silver medal – second place	2026 Aichi-Nagoya	Team
Bronze medal – third place	1962 Jakarta	Team
Bronze medal – third place	1974 Tehran	Team
Bronze medal – third place	1978 Bangkok	Team
Bronze medal – third place	1982 New Delhi	Team
Bronze medal – third place	1990 Beijing	Team
Bronze medal – third place	2002 Busan	Team
Asia Cup
Silver medal – second place	2017 Dhaka	
Silver medal – second place	2022 Jakarta	
Bronze medal – third place	2007 Chennai	
Bronze medal – third place	2025 Rajgir	
Asian Champions Trophy
Silver medal – second place	2023 Chennai	
Bronze medal – third place	2011 Ordos	
Bronze medal – third place	2012 Doha	
Bronze medal – third place	2013 Kakamigahara	
Bronze medal – third place	2016 Kuantan	
Bronze medal – third place	2018 Muscat	
Bronze medal – third place	2026 Punjab	
Champions Challenge
Bronze medal – third place	2014 Kuantan	
Commonwealth Games
Silver medal – second place	1998 Kuala Lumpur	Team
Bronze medal – third place	2006 Melbourne	Team
Sultan Azlan Shah Cup
Gold medal – first place	2023 Ipoh	
Silver medal – second place	1985 Ipoh	
Silver medal – second place	2007 Ipoh	
Silver medal – second place	2009 Ipoh	
Silver medal – second place	2013 Ipoh	
Silver medal – second place	2014 Ipoh	
Bronze medal – third place	1996 Ipoh	
Bronze medal – third place	2019 Ipoh	

The Malaysia men's national field hockey team (nicknamed Speedy Tigers) represents Malaysia in international field hockey competitions. As of September 2026, the team is ranked 14th in the world, and 3rd in Asia, by the International Hockey Federation. The governing body for the sports is the Malaysian Hockey Confederation.

== History ==
Hockey has a long-standing history in Malaysia, with the first formal match taking place in Kuala Lumpur on November 30, 1898, between Harris' XI and Whitley's XI, just 12 years after the first regulated game was played in England in 1886. Malaysia's first international game occurred in 1932 against the Indian Olympic squad, who had recently clinched Olympic gold. Predictably, the visitors emerged victorious with a 7-0 scoreline. Malaysia formed a national hockey body in 1947, and in 1956, they represented Malaya (as it was then known) at the Melbourne Olympics, finishing ninth. Their most notable Olympic performance to date was at the 1972 Games, where they secured eighth place and recorded victories against Spain and Argentina.

Malaysia has qualified for the Hockey World Cup on seven occasions, including the most recent edition. Their best finish to date was in 1975 when they hosted the tournament and achieved a remarkable fourth-place finish, which included a 2-1 victory over the Netherlands.

In recent years, the Malaysian national hockey team has faced challenges in maintaining their past success. They have struggled to replicate their previous achievements at major international tournaments. However, the team has remained competitive in the Asian region.

The crown jewel of Malaysian hockey is the annual Sultan Azlan Shah tournament, held in Kuala Lumpur. Named after the ninth King of Malaysia, Sultan Azlan Shah, a devoted hockey enthusiast, this invitation-only event has been a key highlight since 1983, becoming an annual affair in 2003. In 2022, Malaysia won their first Sultan Azlan Shah Cup after defeating South Korea 3-2.

Kuala Lumpur had the honor of hosting the first Commonwealth Games to include hockey as a sport in 1998. Malaysia's national team showcased their talent by securing a silver medal, narrowly losing 4-0 to Australia in the final. Another significant achievement was Malaysia's hosting of the 2002 World Cup, which featured 16 nations, making it the only single World Cup to adopt this format. This edition also permitted squads of 18 players instead of the usual 16, accommodating the hot and humid conditions.

Malaysia has also played host to the Junior World Cup three times, with the most recent occurrence in 2009. Although Malaysia has achieved fourth place on four occasions, they continue to strive for further success in this prestigious tournament.

The team's development and performance are supported by the Malaysian Hockey Confederation (MHC) and its efforts to promote the sport at various levels, including grassroots development and talent identification programs.

== Competition history ==
A red box around the year indicates tournaments played within Malaysia and best results

=== Summer Olympics ===
Summer Olympics
Year	Round
(Australia) 1956	Ninth place
(Italy) 1960	did not qualify
(Japan) 1964	Ninth place
(Mexico) 1968	Fifteenth place
(Germany) 1972	Eighth place
(Canada) 1976	Ninth place
(Soviet Union) 1980	did not participate
(United States) 1984	Eleventh place
(South Korea) 1988	did not qualify
(Spain) 1992	Ninth place
(United States) 1996	Eleventh place
(Australia) 2000	Eleventh place
(Greece) 2004	did not qualify
(China) 2008	did not qualify
(United Kingdom) 2012	did not qualify
(Brazil) 2016	did not qualify
(Japan) 2020	did not qualify
(France) 2024	did not qualify

=== World Cup ===
World Cup
Year	Round
(Spain) 1971	did not qualify
(Netherlands) 1973	Eleventh place
(Malaysia) 1975	Fourth place
(Argentina) 1978	Tenth place
(India) 1982	Tenth place
(England) 1986	did not qualify
(Pakistan) 1990	did not qualify
(Australia) 1994	did not qualify
(Netherlands) 1998	Eleventh place
(Malaysia) 2002	Eighth place
(Germany) 2006	did not qualify
(India) 2010	did not qualify
(Netherlands) 2014	Twelfth place
(India) 2018	Fifteenth place
(India) 2023	Thirteenth place
(Belgium) (Netherlands) 2026	Sixteenth place

=== Asian Games ===
Asian Games
Year	Round
(Japan) 1958	Fourth place
(Indonesia) 1962	3rd place, bronze medalist(s)
(Thailand) 1966	Fourth place
(Thailand) 1970	Fourth place
(Iran) 1974	3rd place, bronze medalist(s)
(Thailand) 1978	3rd place, bronze medalist(s)
(India) 1982	3rd place, bronze medalist(s)
(South Korea) 1986	Fourth place
(China) 1990	3rd place, bronze medalist(s)
(Japan) 1994	Fifth place
(Thailand) 1998	Fifth place
(South Korea) 2002	3rd place, bronze medalist(s)
(Qatar) 2006	Sixth place
(China) 2010	2nd place, silver medalist(s)
(South Korea) 2014	Fourth place
(Indonesia) 2018	2nd place, silver medalist(s)
(China) 2022	Sixth place
(Japan) 2026	2nd place, silver medalist(s)

=== Asia Cup ===
Asia Cup
Year	Round
(Pakistan) 1982	Fourth place
(Bangladesh) 1985	Fifth place
(India) 1989	Sixth place
(Japan) 1993	Fourth place
(Malaysia) 1999	Fourth place
(Malaysia) 2003	Fifth place
(India) 2007	Third place
(Malaysia) 2009	Fourth place
(Malaysia) 2013	Fourth place
(Bangladesh) 2017	Runner-up
(Indonesia) 2022	Runner-up
(India) 2025	Third place

=== Asian Champions Trophy ===
Asian Champions Trophy record
Year	Host	Position	Pld	W	D	L	GF	GA
2011	Ordos, China	3rd	6	3	1	2	15	12
2012	Doha, Qatar	3rd	6	4	1	1	20	11
2013	Kakamigahara, Japan	3rd	6	3	0	3	17	12
2016	Kuantan, Malaysia	3rd	7	4	1	2	20	10
2018	Muscat, Oman	3rd	7	3	3	1	20	10
2021	Dhaka, Bangladesh	Withdrew						
2023	Chennai, India	2nd	7	5	0	2	21	14
2024	Hulunbuir, China	6th	6	1	2	3	15	23
2026	Punjab, India	3rd	7	4	1	2	22	14
Total		2nd place	52	27	9	16	150	106

=== Commonwealth Games ===
Commonwealth Games
Year	Round
(Malaysia) 1998	2nd place, silver medalist(s)
(Australia) 2006	3rd place, bronze medalist(s)
(India) 2010	Eighth place
(Scotland) 2014	Seventh place
(Australia) 2018	Fifth place
(England) 2022	Withdrew

=== World League ===
FIH Hockey World League
Year	Round
(India) 2012–13	Eleventh place
(India) 2014–15	Twelfth place
(India) 2016–17	Ninth place

=== Nations Cup ===
FIH Hockey Nations Cup
Year	Round
(South Africa) 2022	Fourth place
(Poland) 2023–24	Seventh place
(Malaysia) 2024–25	Sixth place
(South Africa) 2025–26	Fifth place
(Pakistan) 2026–27	Qualified

=== Champions Trophy ===
Champions Trophy
Year	Round
(Malaysia) 1993	Sixth place
(Malaysia) 2007	Eighth place

=== Champions Challenge ===
Champions Challenge
Year	Round
(Malaysia) 2001	Fourth place
(South Africa) 2003	Sixth place
(South Africa) 2011	Fifth place
(Argentina) 2012	Fourth place
(Malaysia) 2014	Third place

=== Champions Challenge II ===
Champions Challenge II
Year	Round
(Republic of Ireland) 2009	Fourth place

=== Sultan Azlan Shah Cup ===
Sultan Azlan Shah Cup
Year	Round
1983	Fourth place
1985	2nd place, silver medalist(s)
1987	Fourth place
1991	Fifth place
1994	Fourth place
1995	Sixth place
1996	3rd place, bronze medalist(s)
1998	Sixth place
1999	3rd place, bronze medalist(s)
2000	Fourth place
2001	Seventh place
2003	Fifth place
2004	Sixth place
2005	Sixth place
2006	Eighth place
2007	2nd place, silver medalist(s)
2008	Seventh place
2009	2nd place, silver medalist(s)
2010	Fourth place
2011	Seventh place
2012	Sixth place
2013	2nd place, silver medalist(s)
2014	2nd place, silver medalist(s)
2015	Sixth place
2016	Fourth place
2017	Fifth place
2018	Fourth place
2019	3rd place, bronze medalist(s)
2022	1st place, gold medalist(s)
2024	Fourth place
2025	Fourth place
2026	

=== Hockey Asean Cup ===
Asean Cup
Year	Round
(Thailand) 2009	1st place, gold medalist(s)
(Myanmar) 2011	1st place, gold medalist(s)

=== Southeast Asian Games ===
SEA Games
Year	Round
(Malaysia) 1971	1st place, gold medalist(s)
(Singapore) 1973	2nd place, silver medalist(s)
(Thailand) 1975	1st place, gold medalist(s)
(Malaysia) 1977	1st place, gold medalist(s)
(Indonesia) 1979	1st place, gold medalist(s)
(Philippines) 1981	Hockey not featured
(Singapore) 1983	1st place, gold medalist(s)
(Thailand) 1985	Hockey not featured
(Indonesia) 1987	1st place, gold medalist(s)
(Malaysia) 1989	1st place, gold medalist(s)
(Philippines) 1991	Hockey not featured
(Singapore) 1993	1st place, gold medalist(s)
(Thailand) 1995	1st place, gold medalist(s)
(Indonesia) 1997	1st place, gold medalist(s)
(Brunei) 1999	1st place, gold medalist(s)
(Malaysia) 2001	1st place, gold medalist(s)
(Vietnam) 2003	Hockey not featured
(Philippines) 2005	Hockey not featured
(Thailand) 2007	1st place, gold medalist(s)
(Laos) 2009	Hockey not featured
(Indonesia) 2011	Hockey not featured
(Myanmar) 2013	1st place, gold medalist(s)
(Singapore) 2015	1st place, gold medalist(s)
(Malaysia) 2017	1st place, gold medalist(s)
(Philippines) 2019	Hockey not featured
(Vietnam) 2021	Hockey not featured
(Cambodia) 2023	1st place, gold medalist(s)

== Players ==
=== Current squad ===
The following is the Malaysia roster in the men's field hockey tournament of the 2026 Asian Games.

Head coach: (South Africa) Brendon Carolan

6. Marhan Jalil (C)
7. Fitri Saari
10. Faizal Saari
11. Akhimullah Anuar
15. Shello Silverius
16. Zaimi Mat Deris (GK)
18. Faiz Jali
20. Ashran Hamsani
21. Hafizuddin Othman (GK)
22. Norsyafiq Sumantri
23. Abu Kamal Azrai
24. Aiman Rozemi
26. Muhajir Abdu Rauf
27. Shafiq Hassan
29. Amirul Azahar
30. Faris Harizan
31. Azimuddin Kamaruddin
32. Aminuddin Mohd Zain
35. Andywalfian Jeffrynus
46. Nur Aqilrullah Che

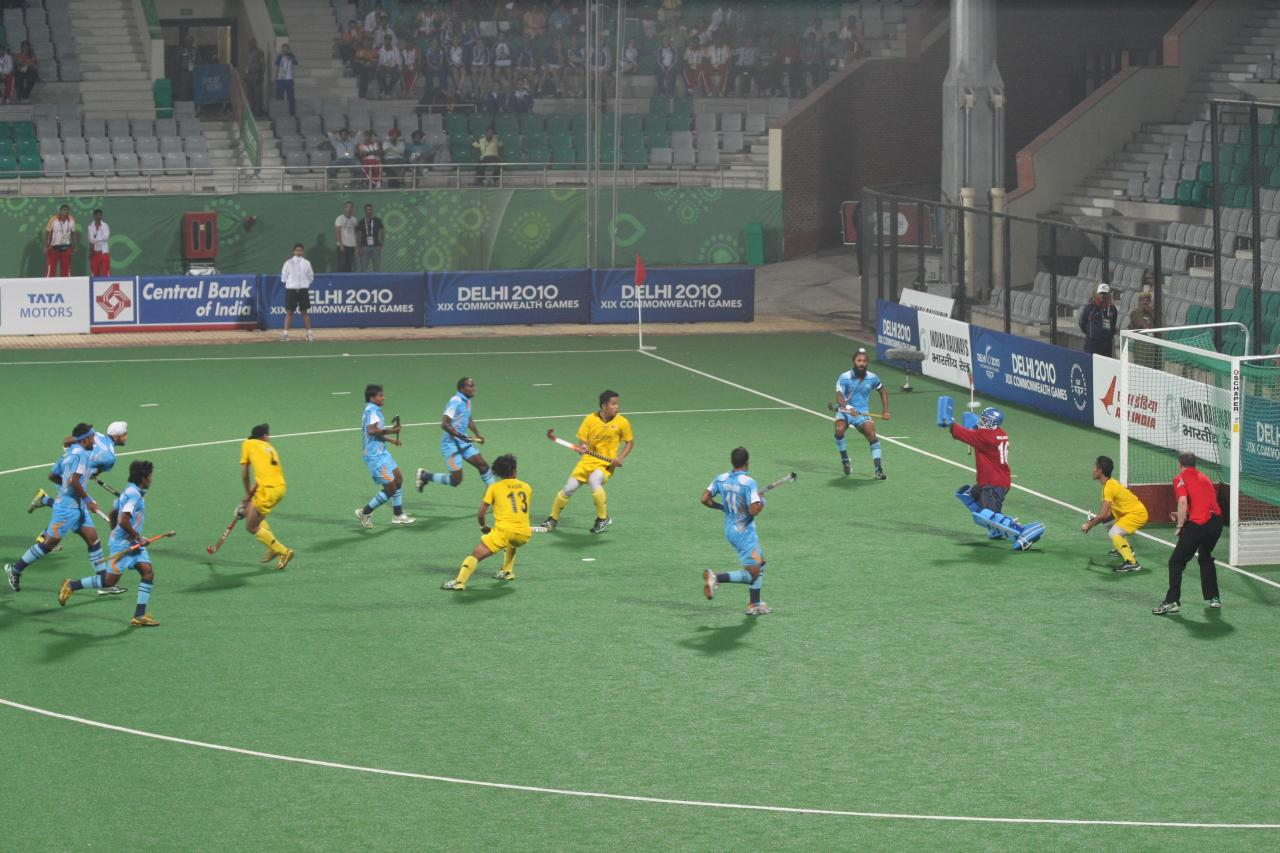
Malaysia vs. India at the 2010 Commonwealth Games on Delhi.

=== Records ===
Most Caps
#	Player	Caps	Career
1	Kuhan Shanmuganathan	330	1994–2007
2	Chua Boon Huat	337	1998–2013
3	Azlan Misron	350	2002–
4	Nor Saiful Zaini	329	1985–2001
5	Mirnawan Nawawi	327	1989–2002

=== Notable former players ===
- Azlan Misron
- Zam Ariffin Ali Piah
- Chairil Anwar
- Chua Boon Huat
- Jiwa Mohan
- Kevin Nunis
- Kuhan Shanmuganathan
- Maninderjit Singh
- Mirnawan Nawawi
- Nor Azlan Bakar
- Nor Saiful Zaini
- Peter van Huizen
- Poon Fook Loke
- Khairuddin Zainal
- Roslan Jamaluddin
- Sarjit Singh
- Shahrun Nabil
- Stephen van Huizen
- Tai Beng Hai
- Soon Mustafa Karim

=== Coaches ===
Period	Coach
1955	Gian Singh (Note: First foreign coach.)
1956	Ted Higgins (Note: First Malayan coach for 1956 Olympic Games but did not go to Melbourne.)
1958 & 1960	M Anwar Beg Moghal (Note: Served as tactical coach for 1958 Asian Games, test match against Korea in 1960 and home international against Singapore in 1961.)
1961	Chua Eng Cheng
1961	M Anwar Beg Moghal
1962	Nabi Ahmed Kalat
1963	Chua Eng Cheng (Note: First Malaysian coach.)
1964	Randhir Singh Gentle (Note: Coach the Malaysian team for three-month only.)
1964	Kishan Lal
1966, 1967–68	Venky Naidu (Note: Coach the Malaysian team for 1966 Asian Games, return in December 1967 for 1968 Olympics.)
1969	M. Shanmughanathan
1970	Datuk Ho Koh Chye
1971	Datuk R. Yogeswaran
1971	Michael Arulraj
1972	Ismail Bakri
1973	Datuk Ho Koh Chye
1973	Michael Arulraj
1974	Datuk Ho Koh Chye
1974	Mohamed Sidek Othman
1975	Datuk Ho Koh Chye
1976	Mohamed Sidek Othman
1977	Datuk R. Yogeswaran
1978	Datuk Ho Koh Chye
1979	Randhir Singh
1980–1981	C. Thavanayagam
1981–1982	Datuk R. Yogeswaran
1982–1986	C. Paramalingam
1987–1988	Datuk Sri Shanmuganathan
1988–1989	Datuk R. Yogeswaran
1990–1993	Terry Walsh
1994 & 1995	Stephen van Huizen (Note: Handled the national team for a month in 1994, in charge for 1995 Southeast Asian Games.)
1994–1998	Volker Knapp
1998–1999	Paul Lissek
Oct 1998– Mar 2001	Stephen van Huizen
Mar 2001–2004	Paul Lissek
2004–2006	Wallace Tan
2006–2008	Sarjit Singh
2009	Tai Beng Hai
2010	Stephen van Huizen
2011	Tai Beng Hai
2012–2014	Paul Revington
2014	Muhammad Dhaarma Raj Abdullah
2015	Tai Beng Hai
2016–2018	Stephen van Huizen
2018–2020	Roelant Oltmans
2020–2024	Arul Selvaraj
2024–Present	Sarjit Singh

== Results and fixtures ==
The following is a list of match results in the last 12 months, as well as any future matches that have been scheduled.

Win Draw Loss Fixture

=== 2026 ===
==== 2026 FIH World Cup Qualifiers ====
1 March 2026 GS	Malaysia	6–1	Austria	Ismailia, Egypt
13:00	Azrai 24', 44'; Silverius 24'; Sumantri 34'; Anuar 52'; Jalil 57'	Report	Losonci 3'	Stadium: Suez Canal Stadium

2 March 2026 GS	Pakistan	5–3	Malaysia	Ismailia, Egypt
16:00	Rana 13'; Hayat 16'; Nadeem 45+'; Khan 49'; Ammad 56'	Report	Abdu Rauf 12'; Anuar 14'; Saari 40'	Stadium: Suez Canal Stadium

4 March 2026 GS	Malaysia	5–4	China	Ismailia, Egypt
15:00	Fi. Saari 5', 43'; Rozemi 28'; Faiz 36'; Fa. Saari 47'	Report	Wang Y. 6'; Zhao 16', 51'; Chen B. 11'	Stadium: Suez Canal Stadium

6 March 2026 SF	England	7–1	Malaysia	Ismailia, Egypt
13:15	Ward 19'; Hooper 36', 60'; Sorsby 42'; Rushmere 43', 49'; Wallace 54'	Report	Hassan 50'	Stadium: Suez Canal Stadium

7 March 2026 Third and fourth place	Malaysia	4–5	Japan	Ismailia, Egypt
15:00	Saari 30'; Jalil 32'; Cholan 36'; F.Saari 59'	Report	Ooka 15'; Matsumoto 38'; Fujishima 52'; Yamasaki 55', 57'	Stadium: Suez Canal Stadium

==== 2026 FIH Nations Cup ====
11 June 2026 Pool A	Malaysia	5–2	Scotland	Cape Town, South Africa
12:15	Anuar 4'; Azrai 34', 49', 59'; Rozemi 42'	Report	Golden 40'; McConnell 57'	Stadium: Hartleyvale Stadium

12 June 2026 Pool A	Malaysia	1–4	Japan	Cape Town, South Africa
16:15	Saari 4'	Report	Yamada 26'; Matsumoto 29'; Tanaka 50'; Fujishima 55'	Stadium: Hartleyvale Stadium

16 June 2026 Pool A	Malaysia	1–5	New Zealand	Cape Town, South Africa
12:15	Anuar 56'	Report	Russell 18', 25'; Thomas 20'; Houlbrooke 42'; Elmes 51'	Stadium: Hartleyvale Stadium

17 June 2026 Pool A	South Korea	1–2	Malaysia	Cape Town, South Africa
16:45	Gang-san 20'	Report	Anuar 5'; Silverius 58'	Stadium: Hartleyvale Stadium

19 June 2026 5/8 Classification	Malaysia	4–2	United States	Cape Town, South Africa
12:15	Anuar 33'; Azrai 39'; Saari 52'; Harizan 55'	Report	Charasika 5'; Montilla 17'	Stadium: Hartleyvale Stadium

20 June 2026 5/6 Classification	Malaysia	4–2	Scotland	Cape Town, South Africa
14:30	Saari 8'; Azrai 19', 50'; Anuar 45'	Report	Golden 32'; Nairn 44'	Stadium: Hartleyvale Stadium

==== South Africa Test series ====
6 July 2026 Test 1	South Africa	3–1	Malaysia	Durban North, South Africa
19:00	Mentoor 18'; Wynford 20'; Cassiem 44'	Report	Rozemi 58'	Stadium: Riverside Hockey Club

7 July 2026 Test 2	South Africa	2–1	Malaysia	Hilton, South Africa
18:00	Seale 44'; Cassiem 45'	Report	Azrai 44'	Stadium: Hilton College

9 July 2026 Test 3	South Africa	2–2	Malaysia	Hilton, South Africa
18:00	Mvimbi 48'; Cassiem 55'	Report	Cholan 42'; Azrai 56'	Stadium: Hilton College

10 July 2026 Test 4	South Africa	3–3	Malaysia	Durban North, South Africa
19:00	de Lora 20'; Ngubane 34'; Cassiem 55'	Report	Kamaruddin 8'; Anuar 11'; Azrai 57'	Stadium: Riverside Hockey Club

12 July 2026 Test 5	South Africa	5–2	Malaysia	Durban North, South Africa
10:30	Melville 5', 26', 32'; Mthalane 37'; Mentoor 41'	Report	Cholan 3'; Rozemi 43'	Stadium: Riverside Hockey Club

==== 2026 FIH World Cup ====
15 August 2026 Pool B	Germany	5–1	Malaysia	Wavre, Belgium
14:30	Brilla 3'; Rühr 4'; Weigand 7'; Warweg 44'; Kaufmann 52'	Report	Azrai 39'	Stadium: Belfius Hockey Arena

17 August 2026 Pool B	France	3–3	Malaysia	Wavre, Belgium
14:00	Charlet 19'; Haertelmeyer 37'; Jouin 59'	Report	Silverius 5', 45'; Anuar 57'	Stadium: Belfius Hockey Arena

19 August 2026 Pool B	Belgium	5–3	Malaysia	Wavre, Belgium
20:30	Boon 17', 20', 36', 53'; Stockbroekx 43'	Report	Rozemi 32'; Jalil 37'; Anuar 53'	Stadium: Belfius Hockey Arena

21 August 2026 Pool H	Ireland	7–4	Malaysia	Wavre, Belgium
14:00	Lynch 8', 12', 24'; Nelson 19', 39'; McKee 37'; Walker 54'	Report	Kamaruddin 29'; Azahar 36'; Azrai 41'; Fa. Saari 55'	Stadium: Belfius Hockey Arena

23 August 2026 Pool H	Malaysia	3–3	South Africa	Wavre, Belgium
11:30	Azrai 14', 22'; Fa. Saari 60'	Report	Wynford 17'; Spooner 28'; M. Cassiem 43'	Stadium: Belfius Hockey Arena

28 August 2026 15th place match	Wales	2–2 (2–1 p)	Malaysia	Wavre, Belgium
11:00	Francis 29'; Barker 53'	Report	Fa. Saari 41'; Anuar 52'	Stadium: Belfius Hockey Arena
	Penalties
	J. Morgan (penalty shoot-out scored); Welsh (penalty shoot-out missed); Newbold (penalty shoot-out missed); Pritchard (penalty shoot-out scored)		(penalty shoot-out missed) Rozemi; (penalty shoot-out missed) Fa. Saari; (penalty shoot-out scored) Fi. Saari; (penalty shoot-out missed) Azrai; (penalty shoot-out missed) Silverius

==== 2026 Asian Games ====
20 September 2026 Pool B	Malaysia	7–0	Uzbekistan	Kakamigahara, Japan
13:00	Sumantri 11'; Saari 15', 24', 43'; Kamaruddin 36'; Azrai 59'; Jali 60'	Report		Stadium: Gifu Prefectural Green Stadium

22 September 2026 Pool B	Malaysia	7–0	Oman	Kakamigahara, Japan
15:00	Saari 3', 43'; Rozemi 17'; Azrai 24', 57'; Silverius 30'; Anuar 57'	Report		Stadium: Gifu Prefectural Green Stadium

24 September 2026 Pool B	Thailand	0–10	Malaysia	Kakamigahara, Japan
09:00		Report	Saari 18', 35'; Abdu Rauf 20'; Azrai 21', 41'; Mohd Zain 28'; Hamsani 35'; Silverius 55'; Jali 59'; Anuar 60'	Stadium: Gifu Prefectural Green Stadium

26 September 2026 Pool B	Malaysia	5–4	Pakistan	Kakamigahara, Japan
13:00	Silverius 5', 56'; Fa. Saari 23'; Fi. Saari 45'; Azrai 57'	Report	Khan 3', 39', 43', 46'	Stadium: Gifu Prefectural Green Stadium

28 September 2026 Pool B	China	0–5	Malaysia	Kakamigahara, Japan
09:00		Report	Fi. Saari 13'; Anuar 22'; Hamsani 24'; Fa. Saari 43'; Azrai 59'	Stadium: Gifu Prefectural Green Stadium

1 October 2026 Semi-final	Malaysia	2–1	South Korea	Kakamigahara, Japan
19:00	Azrai 40', 45'	Report	Lee G. 42'	Stadium: Gifu Prefectural Green Stadium

3 October 2026 Gold medal match	India	5–1	Malaysia	Kakamigahara, Japan
19:00	Harmanpreet 11', 57'; Jugraj 23'; Hardik 42'; Lakra 54'	Report	Silverius 14'	Stadium: Gifu Prefectural Green Stadium

==== 2026 Asian Champions Trophy ====
27 October 2026 Group Stage	Malaysia	5–4	China	Jalandhar, India
13:00	Azrai 4', 14'; Anuar 14'; Fa. Saari 34'; Kamaruddin 35'	Report	Wang 11'; Ne 12'; Chen 27', 44'	Stadium: Surjit Hockey Stadium

29 October 2026 Group Stage	Malaysia	3–1	South Korea	Jalandhar, India
14:30	Kamaruddin 10'; Anuar 36'; Fa. Saari 50'	Report	Song. H 31'	Stadium: Surjit Hockey Stadium

30 October 2026 Group Stage	Bangladesh	1–6	Malaysia	Jalandhar, India
14:30	Amirul 26'	Report	Azrai 14', 22'; Anuar 29'; Kamaruddin 32'; Silverius 33'; Rozemi 50'	Stadium: Surjit Hockey Stadium

1 November 2026 Group Stage	Malaysia	2–4	India	Jalandhar, India
19:00	Anuar 25'; Silverius 60'	Report	Harmanpreet 3', 33', 58'; Sukhjeet 43'	Stadium: Surjit Hockey Stadium

2 November 2026 Group Stage	Japan	2–1	Malaysia	Jalandhar, India
16:45	Fukuda 24', 54'	Report	Azrai 10'	Stadium: Surjit Hockey Stadium

4 November 2026 Semi-final	Japan	0–0 (5–3 p)	Malaysia	Mohali, India
16:30		Report		Stadium: Olympian Balbir Singh Senior International Hockey Stadium
	Penalties
	Matsumoto (penalty shoot-out scored); Ooka (penalty shoot-out scored); T. Tanaka (penalty shoot-out scored); Ochiai (penalty shoot-out scored); S. Tanaka (penalty shoot-out scored)		(penalty shoot-out missed) Fa. Saari; (penalty shoot-out scored) Rozemi; (penalty shoot-out scored) Silverius; (penalty shoot-out scored) Azrai

5 November 2026 Bronze medal match	South Korea	2–5	Malaysia	Mohali, India
16:00	Park 5'; Chun 13'	Report	Fi. Saari 2'; Fa. Saari 34'; Azrai 45', 50'; Jalil 58'	Stadium: Olympian Balbir Singh Senior International Hockey Stadium

==== Sultan Azlan Shah Cup ====
20 November 2026 Round Robin	Malaysia	3–0	South Korea	Ipoh, Malaysia
19:30	Azrai 36'; Kamaruddin 38'; Fa. Saari 56'	Report		Stadium: Azlan Shah Stadium

21 November 2026 Round Robin	Malaysia	6–0	Canada	Ipoh, Malaysia
19:30	Fa. Saari 2', 35', 49', 57'; Azrai 23'; Azahar 28'	Report		Stadium: Azlan Shah Stadium

23 November 2026 Round Robin	United States	v	Malaysia	Ipoh, Malaysia
19:30				Stadium: Azlan Shah Stadium

24 November 2026 Round Robin	Malaysia	v	Australia	Ipoh, Malaysia
19:30				Stadium: Azlan Shah Stadium

26 November 2026 Round Robin	Malaysia	v	Pakistan	Ipoh, Malaysia
19:30				Stadium: Azlan Shah Stadium

== See also ==
- India–Malaysia field hockey rivalry
- Malaysia women's national field hockey team
- Malaysia men's national under-21 field hockey team
