= Andrew Lochrin =

Scottish field hockey player

Personal information
- Born: 18 March 2001 (age 25) Scotland

Sport
- Sport: Field hockey
- Position: Defender
Senior career
Years	Team	Caps	Goals
2021–2022	Uddingston	-	-
2022–2025	Western Wildcats	-	-
National team
Years	Team	Caps	Goals
2023–	Scotland	26	-
Medal record
Representing Scotland
European Championship II
Bronze medal – third place	2023 Dublin	Team
Bronze medal – third place	2025 Lousada	Team
Nations Cup 2
Gold medal – first place	2025 Muscat	Team

Andrew Lochrin (born 18 March 2001) is a Scottish field hockey player who has represented Scotland and won consecutive bronze medals at the Men's EuroHockey Championship II.

== Biography ==
Lochrin studied Physiology & Sports Science at the University of Glasgow from 2019 to 2023. He played club hockey for Uddingston Hockey Club before signing for Western Wildcats Hockey Club in the Scottish Hockey Premiership for the 2022/23 season.

He made his Scottish debut in 2023 and helped Scotland win the bronze medal at the 2023 Men's EuroHockey Championship II in Dublin.

In February 2025, he was part of the men's squad for 2024–25 Men's FIH Hockey Nations Cup 2 in Muscat, Oman, and helped the team win the gold medal and a few months later, helped Scotland win another bronze medal at the 2025 Men's EuroHockey Championship II in Lousada, Portugal, defeating Italy in the third place play off.
