= Rob Field =

Scottish field hockey player

Personal information
- Born: 14 April 1994 (age 32) Scotland

Sport
- Sport: Field hockey
- Position: Midfield
Senior career
Years	Team	Caps	Goals
2009–Present	Holcombe	-	-
National team
Years	Team	Caps	Goals
–	Scotland	54	(3)
Medal record
Representing Scotland
European Championship II
Silver medal – second place	2021 Gniezno	Team
Bronze medal – third place	2023 Dublin	Team
Bronze medal – third place	2025 Lousada	Team
Nations Cup 2
Gold medal – first place	2025 Muscat	Team

Rob Field (born 14 April 1994) is a Scottish field hockey player who has represented Scotland and is the current team captain. Representing Scotland he has play at the 2022 Commonwealth Games and has won three medals at the Men's EuroHockey Championship II.

== Biography ==
Field played club hockey in the Men's England Hockey League for Holcombe and while at Holcombe, represented Scotland at the 2022 Commonwealth Games in Birmingham.

In 2021 and 2023 respectively, he helped Scotland win the silver and bronze medals at the 2021 Men's EuroHockey Championship II in Gniezno, Poland and the 2023 Men's EuroHockey Championship II in Dublin.

In February 2024, he won the Scottish International Player of the Year award and in August 2024, was part of the men's squad for their EuroHockey Championship qualifier in Vienna.

In February 2025, he was part of the men's squad for 2024–25 Men's FIH Hockey Nations Cup 2 in Muscat, Oman, and helped the team win the gold medal and a few months later, he helped Scotland win the bronze medal at the 2025 Men's EuroHockey Championship II in Lousada, Portugal, defeating Italy in the third place play off.
