= David Forrester (field hockey) =

Scottish field hockey player

Personal information
- Born: 14 December 1989 (age 36) Glasgow, Scotland

Sport
- Sport: Field hockey
- Position: Goalkeeper
Senior career
Years	Team	Caps	Goals
2010–2011	Edinburgh Univ	-	-
2012–2013	Inverleith	-	-
2013–2014	Old Loughtonians	-	-
2016–2017	Edinburgh Univ	-	-
2017–2019	Club Montrouge	-	-
2019–2023	Grange	-	-
National team
Years	Team	Caps	Goals
2013–2024	Scotland	60	-
Medal record
Representing Scotland
European Championship II
Gold medal – first place	2017 Glasgow	Team
Silver medal – second place	2021 Gniezno	Team

David Forrester (born 14 December 1989) is a Scottish field hockey player who represented the Scottish national team at the 2022 Commonwealth Games.

== Biography ==
Forrester was born in Glasgow and educated at Our Lady of the Annunciation and Saint Aloysius' College and studied law at the University of Edinburgh.

While at university he played club hockey for the Edinburgh University Hockey Club in the Scottish Hockey National Leagues system. After university he played for Inverleith Hockey Club and then Old Loughtonians Hockey Club in the Men's England Hockey League. He made his Scotland debut against Wales in 2013,

He won a gold medal with Scotland at the 2017 Men's EuroHockey Championship II in Glasgow, but missed the 2018 Commonwealth Games with a shoulder injury.

Forrester had another spell at Edinburgh University before playing in Paris for Club Montrouge. He played for Scotland at the 2019 Men's EuroHockey Championship and returned to Scottish hockey for Grange Hockey Club in the Scottish Hockey Premiership, where he captained the team.

In 2021 and 2023, he helped Scotland win the silver and bronze medals at the 2021 Men's EuroHockey Championship II in Gniezno, Poland and the 2023 Men's EuroHockey Championship II in Dublin. In between the two medals in 2022, he was selected to represent Scotland at the 2022 Commonwealth Games in Birmingham, England, in the men's tournament.

In June 2024, he announced his retirement from international hockey after winning 60 caps.
