= Matthew Taylor (field hockey) =

Scottish field hockey player

Personal information
- Born: 25 April 2001 (age 25) Scotland

Sport
- Sport: Field hockey
- Position: Goalkeeper
Senior career
| Years | Team | Caps | Goals |
| 2017–2021 | Inverleith | - | - |
| 2022–2023 | Grange | - | - |
| 2024–2025 | Edinburgh Univ | - | - |
National team
| Years | Team | Caps | Goals |
| – | Scotland | | - |
Medal record
Representing Scotland
European Championship II
| Bronze medal – third place | 2025 Lousada | Team |
Nations Cup 2
| Gold medal – first place | 2025 Muscat | Team |

Matthew Taylor (born 25 April 2001) is a Scottish field hockey player who has represented Scotland and won a gold medal at the Men's FIH Hockey Nations Cup 2 and bronze medal at the Men's EuroHockey Championship II.

== Biography ==
Taylor was educated at Edinburgh Academy and studied Product Design at Edinburgh Napier University.

He made his Scotland U21 debut in 2022 and became a teacher at Edinburgh Academy.

He played club hockey for Inverleith Hockey Club and Grange Hockey Club in the Scottish Hockey Premiership before switching to Edinburgh University Hockey Club, where he made his Scotland debut. In February 2025, he was part of the men's squad for 2024–25 Men's FIH Hockey Nations Cup 2 in Muscat, Oman, and helped the team win the gold medal. A few months later he helped Scotland win the bronze medal at the 2025 Men's EuroHockey Championship II in Lousada, Portugal, defeating Italy in the third place play off.
