= Craig Falconer =

Scottish field hockey player

Personal information
- Born: 6 September 1993 (age 32) Scotland

Sport
- Sport: Field hockey
- Position: Midfield/Forward
Senior career
Years	Team	Caps	Goals
2010–2015	Grove Menzieshill	-	-
2017–2018	Gordonians	-	-
2018–2022	Reading	-	-
2022–2025	Brooklands	-	-
National team
Years	Team	Caps	Goals
–	Scotland	43	-
Medal record
Representing Scotland
Nations Cup 2
Gold medal – first place	2025 Muscat	Team
European Championship II
Bronze medal – third place	2023 Dublin	Team

Craig Falconer (born 6 September 1993) is a Scottish field hockey player who has represented Scotland and won a gold medal at the Men's FIH Hockey Nations Cup 2.

== Biography ==
Falconer played for Grove Menzieshill Hockey Club and captained Gordonians Hockey Club in the Scottish National Leagues before leaving Scotland in 2018 to play for Reading Hockey Club in Men's England Hockey League.

He then left Reading for Brooklands Hockey Club 2022 and on 4 August 2023, Falconer became the head coach of Brooklands Hockey Club women's team.

In 2023, he helped Scotland win the bronze medal at the 2023 Men's EuroHockey Championship II in Dublin.

In February 2025, he was part of the Scotland squad for 2024–25 Men's FIH Hockey Nations Cup 2 in Muscat, Oman, and helped the team win the gold medal.
