= Iain McFadden =

Scottish field hockey player

Personal information
- Born: 26 March 2002 (age 24) Scotland

Sport
- Sport: Field hockey
- Position: Defender
Senior career
Years	Team	Caps	Goals
2010–2020	Highland	-	-
2020–2023	Edinburgh Univ	-	-
2023–2024	Western Wildcats	-	-
2024–2025	Edinburgh Univ	-	-
2025-	Western Wildcats	-	-
National team
Years	Team	Caps	Goals
–	Scotland	21	-
Medal record
Representing Scotland
European Championship II
Bronze medal – third place	2025 Lousada	Team
Nations Cup 2
Gold medal – first place	2025 Muscat	Team

Iain McFadden (born 26 March 2002) is a Scottish field hockey player who has represented Scotland and won a bronze medal at the Men's EuroHockey Championship II.

== Biography ==
McFadden studied Geophysics at the University of Edinburgh and played club hockey for Edinburgh University Hockey Club. He was part of the Edinburgh team that helped the club reach the BUCS Premiership in 2022.

He joined the Western Wildcats Hockey Club in the Scottish Hockey Premiership for the 2023/24 season and made his Scotland debut in 2024.

He returned to play for Edinburgh University and in February 2025, he was part of the Scotland squad for 2024–25 Men's FIH Hockey Nations Cup 2 in Muscat, Oman, and helped the team win the gold medal and in April 2025, scored in the Scottish Hockey Cup final to help secure the trophy for the first time in the University's history. Shortly afterwards, he helped Scotland win the bronze medal at the 2025 Men's EuroHockey Championship II in Lousada, Portugal, defeating Italy in the third place play off.
