= Callum Mackenzie =

Scottish field hockey player

Personal information
- Born: 31 December 1998 (age 27) Scotland

Sport
- Sport: Field hockey
- Position: Defender
Senior career
Years	Team	Caps	Goals
2017–2019	Grange	-	-
2019–2021	Cardiff & Met	-	-
2021–2026	Wimbledon	-	-
National team
Years	Team	Caps	Goals
–	Scotland	62	(2)
Medal record
Representing Scotland
European Championship II
Silver medal – second place	2021 Gniezno	Team
Bronze medal – third place	2023 Dublin	Team
Bronze medal – third place	2025 Lousada	Team
Nations Cup 2
Gold medal – first place	2025 Muscat	Team

Callum Mackenzie (born 31 December 1998) is a Scottish field hockey player who has represented Scotland and won a bronze medal at the Men's EuroHockey Championship II.

== Biography ==
Mackenzie participated at the 2019 Men's EuroHockey Championship and helped Scotland win the silver medal at the 2021 Men's EuroHockey Championship II in Gniezno, Poland

Mackenzie played for Grange in the Scottish Hockey Premiership and then Cardiff & Met but signed for Wimbledon Hockey Club in the Men's England Hockey League from 2021. While at Wimbledon, he represented Scotland at the 2022 Commonwealth Games in Birmingham.

In 2023, he helped Scotland win the bronze medal at the 2023 Men's EuroHockey Championship II in Dublin and in August 2024, was part of the men's squad for their EuroHockey Championship qualifier in Vienna.

In February 2025, he was part of the men's squad for 2024–25 Men's FIH Hockey Nations Cup 2 in Muscat, Oman, and helped the team win the gold medal and a few months later, he helped Scotland win the bronze medal at the 2025 Men's EuroHockey Championship II in Lousada, Portugal, defeating Italy in the third place play off.

Since September 2022, Mackenzie has coached hockey at Kingston Grammar School.
