= Jamie Wong (field hockey) =

Scottish field hockey player

Personal information
- Born: 3 November 1995 (age 30) Vancouver, Canada

Sport
- Sport: Field hockey
- Position: Defender/Midfielder
Senior career
Years	Team	Caps	Goals
2012–2014	Gordonians	-	-
2014–2017	Edinburgh Univ	-	-
2017–2018	Qui Vive	-	-
2018–2019	HC Klein Zwitserland	-	-
National team
Years	Team	Caps	Goals
2015–2019	Scotland	36	-
Medal record
Representing Scotland
European Championship II
Gold medal – first place	2017 Glasgow	Team

Jamie Wong (born 3 November 1995) is a Scottish field hockey player who has represented Scotland at the 2018 Commonwealth Games.

== Biography ==
Wong was born in Vancouver, Canada, and was educated at Compton Primary and Robert Gordon's College. He studied Chemical Engineering at the University of Edinburgh and Sustainable Development at the Delft University of Technology.

Wong played club hockey for Gordonians Hockey Club in the Scottish Hockey Premiership before going to university. While at University he played for Edinburgh University Hockey Club and won a gold medal with Scotland at the 2017 Men's EuroHockey Championship II in Glasgow.

He then moved to study in the Netherlands, living in Amsterdam and playing hockey for the Qui Vive Hockey Club and then HC Klein Zwitserland.

He participated in the Commonwealth Games hockey tournament at the 2018 Commonwealth Games in Gold Coast, Australia.
