= Ali Douglas (field hockey) =

Scottish field hockey player

Personal information
- Born: 13 November 2003 (age 22) Scotland

Sport
- Sport: Field hockey
- Position: Forward
Senior career
Years	Team	Caps	Goals
2019–2022	Clydesdale	-	-
2022–2023	Grossflottbeker THGC	-	-
2023–2025	Southgate	-	-
2025–2026	Holcombe	-	-
National team
Years	Team	Caps	Goals
–	Scotland	31	(4)
Medal record
Representing Scotland
European Championship II
Bronze medal – third place	2023 Dublin	Team
Bronze medal – third place	2025 Lousada	Team
Nations Cup 2
Gold medal – first place	2025 Muscat	Team

Alastair Douglas (born 13 November 2003) is a Scottish field hockey player who has represented Scotland and won two consecutive bronze medals at the Men's EuroHockey Championship II.

== Biography ==
Douglas was educated at Alvie Primary School and Kingussie High School and in 2019 was named Scotland's best young hockey player.

He played club hockey in the Scottish National Leagues before playing a season in Germany and then joining Southgate Hockey Club in England.

In 2023, he helped Scotland win the bronze medal at the 2023 Men's EuroHockey Championship II in Dublin and in August 2024, was part of the men's squad for their EuroHockey Championship qualifier in Vienna.

In February 2025, he was part of the men's squad for 2024–25 Men's FIH Hockey Nations Cup 2 in Muscat, Oman, and helped the team win the gold medal.

In April 2025, Douglas was named in the Great Britain development squad and he then signed for Holcombe Hockey Club in the Men's England Hockey League for the 2025–26 season. Shortly afterwards, he helped Scotland win the bronze medal at the 2025 Men's EuroHockey Championship II in Lousada, Portugal, defeating Italy in the third place play off.

== Family ==
His brother is fellow hockey international Calum Douglas.
