= Alasdair Richmond =

Scottish field hockey player

Personal information
- Born: 6 August 2000 (age 26) Scotland

Sport
- Sport: Field hockey
- Position: Defender
Senior career
Years	Team	Caps	Goals
2010-2018	Clydesdale	-	-
2018–2022	Loughborough Students'	-	-
2022–2026	Beeston	-	-
National team
Years	Team	Caps	Goals
–	Scotland	18	-
Medal record
Representing Scotland
European Championship II
Bronze medal – third place	2025 Lousada	Team
Nations Cup 2
Gold medal – first place	2025 Muscat	Team

Alasdair Richmond (born 6 August 2000) is a Scottish field hockey player who has represented Scotland and won a bronze medal at the Men's EuroHockey Championship II.

== Biography ==
Richmond was educated at Hutchesons' Grammar School and studied Economics at Loughborough University from 2018 to 2022. While at Loughborough he played club hockey for Loughborough Students' Hockey Club in the Men's England Hockey League.

After university, he left Loughborough and signed for Beeston Hockey Club and while at Beeston, made his Scotland debut in 2024.

In August 2024, was part of the men's squad for their EuroHockey Championship qualifier in Vienna.

In February 2025, he was part of the men's squad for 2024–25 Men's FIH Hockey Nations Cup 2 in Muscat, Oman, and helped the team win the gold medal and a few months later, he helped Scotland win the bronze medal at the 2025 Men's EuroHockey Championship II in Lousada, Portugal, defeating Italy in the third place play off.
