= Ben Galloway =

Scottish field hockey player

Personal information
- Born: 8 February 2004 (age 22) Glasgow, Scotland

Sport
- Sport: Field hockey
- Position: Forward
Senior career
Years	Team	Caps	Goals
2018–2021	Clydesdale	-	-
2021–2025	Exeter Univ	-	-
National team
Years	Team	Caps	Goals
2024–	Scotland		-
Medal record
Representing Scotland
Nations Cup 2
Gold medal – first place	2025 Muscat	Team

Ben Galloway (born 8 February 2004) is a Scottish field hockey player who has represented Scotland and won a gold medal at the Men's FIH Hockey Nations Cup 2.

== Biography ==
Galloway studied at the University of Exeter on a Sports Scholarship, from 2021 to 2025.

Galloway joined Clydesdale, who played in the Scottish Hockey Premiership and worked his way up through the juniors and men's teams before making the first team in 2018, aged just 15. He then became part of the Scotland U16s and U19s respectively. After Clydesdale, he moved to England to play for University of Exeter Hockey Club in the Men's England Hockey League and while at university made his Scotland debut in 2024.

In February 2025, he was part of the Scotland squad for 2024–25 Men's FIH Hockey Nations Cup 2 in Muscat, Oman, and helped the team win the gold medal.
