= Andrew McAllister =

Scottish field hockey player

Personal information
- Born: 27 April 2001 (age 25) Scotland

Sport
- Sport: Field hockey
- Position: Forward
Senior career
Years	Team	Caps	Goals
2014–2025	Western Wildcats	-	-
National team
Years	Team	Caps	Goals
–	Scotland	25	-
Medal record
Representing Scotland
European Championship II
Bronze medal – third place	2025 Lousada	Team
Nations Cup 2
Gold medal – first place	2025 Muscat	Team

Andrew McAllister (born 27 April 2001) is a Scottish field hockey player who has represented Scotland and won a bronze medal at the Men's EuroHockey Championship II.

== Biography ==
McAllister studied Electrical and Electronic Engineering at the University of Strathclyde. McAllister played for the Scotland U21s from 2019 to 2022.

In 2024/25 he played club hockey for Western Wildcats Hockey Club in the Scottish Hockey Premiership from having previously played at junior level for the club from 2014 to 2017.

In February 2025, he was part of the men's squad for 2024–25 Men's FIH Hockey Nations Cup 2 in Muscat, Oman, and helped the team win the gold medal and a few months later, he helped Scotland win the bronze medal at the 2025 Men's EuroHockey Championship II in Lousada, Portugal, defeating Italy in the third place play off.
