= Graham Moodie =

British field hockey player (born 1981)

Personal information
- Born: 15 January 1981 (age 45) Balerno, Scotland
- Height: 175 cm (5 ft 9 in)
- Weight: 74 kg (163 lb)

Sport
- Sport: Field hockey
- Position: midfielder
Senior career
| Years | Team | Caps | Goals |
| 2004 | Western Wildcats | - | - |
| 2006 | Inverleith | - | - |
| 2010 | Edinburgh University | - | - |
National team
| Years | Team | Caps | Goals |
| 2003–2008 | GB | 56 | - |
| – | Scotland | 148 | - |
Medal record
Representing Scotland
European Championship II
| Bronze medal – third place | 2011 Vinnytsia | Team |

Graham Thomas Moodie (born 15 January 1981) is a Scottish former field hockey player, who competed at the 2004 Summer Olympics.

== Biography ==
Moodie born in Balerno, Scotland played as a midfielder and started playing hockey at primary school at eleven years old. His brothers Alan and Ian also competed for East of Scotland up to U18 and U15 respectively.

Moodie made his Great Britain debut on 1 July 2003. While at Western Wildcats he represented Great Britain at the 2004 Olympic Games in Athens.

In 2006, as an Inverleith Hockey Club player, he was part of the Scotland Commonwealth Games team at the 2006 Commonwealth Games in Melbourne.

In 2010, Moodie was playing for Edinburgh University when he was selected for Scotland during the 2010 Commonwealth Games in Delhi. The following year he won a bronze medal with the team at the 2011 Men's EuroHockey Championship II in Vinnytsia, Ukraine.

At retirement Moodie had amassed 56 Great Britain senior caps and 148 Scotland Senior caps representing Scotland. Moodie also played club hockey for MIM Edinburgh, Western Territory Stingers, Cannock and for Stirling University in BUSA (British University Championships).

He became player coach of the University of Edinburgh from 2009 to 2014, before becoming Head of Performance Men's Hockey until 2021. and since 2012 Graham has been the Head coach of the Scotland U21 Men's programme and an assistant coach for Scotland Senior Men. He is also an assistant coach on the Men's Great Britain Elite Development programme and a partner in Complete Hockey Coaching.
