= Thomas Austin (field hockey) =

Scottish field hockey player

Personal information
- Born: 20 April 2007 (age 19) Scotland

Sport
- Sport: Field hockey
- Position: Midfield
Senior career
Years	Team	Caps	Goals
2022–2024	Kelburne	-	-
2024–2025	Western Wildcats	-	-
2025–2026	Surbiton	-	-
National team
Years	Team	Caps	Goals
–	Scotland	32	(2)
Medal record
Representing Scotland
European Championship II
Bronze medal – third place	2023 Dublin	Team
Bronze medal – third place	2025 Lousada	Team
Nations Cup 2
Gold medal – first place	2025 Muscat	Team

Thomas Austin (born 20 April 2007) is a Scottish field hockey player who has represented Scotland and won two consecutive bronze medals at the Men's EuroHockey Championship II.

== Biography ==
Austin made his full senior Scottish debut at the age of 16.

In 2023, he helped Scotland win the bronze medal at the 2023 Men's EuroHockey Championship II in Dublin,

Austin was part of the Great Britain U21 side that won the 2024 Sultan of Johor Cup and in August 2024, was part of the men's squad for their EuroHockey Championship qualifier in Vienna.

He played club hockey for Western Wildcats Hockey Club in the Scottish Hockey Premiership after signing from Kelburne Hockey Club. In April 2025, Austin was named in the Great Britain development squad

In February 2025, he was part of the men's squad for 2024–25 Men's FIH Hockey Nations Cup 2 in Muscat, Oman, and helped the team win the gold medal.

In May 2025, Austin signed for Surbiton Hockey Club in the Men's England Hockey League for the 2025–2026. Shortly afterwards, he helped Scotland win the bronze medal at the 2025 Men's EuroHockey Championship II in Lousada, Portugal, defeating Italy in the third place play off.
