= Jamie Croll =

Scottish field hockey player

Personal information
- Born: 7 January 2004 (age 22) Scotland

Sport
- Sport: Field hockey
- Position: Defender
Senior career
Years	Team	Caps	Goals
2018–2022	Grange	-	-
2022–2026	Edinburgh Univ	-	-
National team
Years	Team	Caps	Goals
–	Scotland	21	-
Medal record
Representing Scotland
European Championship II
Bronze medal – third place	2025 Lousada	Team
Nations Cup 2
Gold medal – first place	2025 Muscat	Team

Jamie Croll (born 7 January 2004) is a Scottish field hockey player who has represented Scotland and won a bronze medal at the Men's EuroHockey Championship II.

== Biography ==
Croll was educated at Stewart's Melville College and studied Geography and Politics at the University of Edinburgh. He played club hockey for the Edinburgh University Hockey Club in the Scottish Hockey Premiership from 2022.

In 2023, he was selected for the Great Britain men's Elite Development Programme (EDP) and made his Scotland debut in 2024.

In February 2025, he was part of the men's squad for 2024–25 Men's FIH Hockey Nations Cup 2 in Muscat, Oman, and helped the team win the gold medal and a few months later, he helped Scotland win the bronze medal at the 2025 Men's EuroHockey Championship II in Lousada, Portugal, defeating Italy in the third place play off.
