= Keir Robb =

Scottish field hockey player

Personal information
- Born: 19 January 2002 (age 24) Scotland

Sport
- Sport: Field hockey
- Position: Forward
Senior career
- Years: Team
- 2013–2020: Grove Menzieshill
- 2021–2026: Edinburgh Univ
- 2024–2025: Inverleith
National team
Years	Team	Caps	Goals
–	Scotland	31	-
Medal record
Representing Scotland
European Championship II
Bronze medal – third place	2023 Dublin	Team
Bronze medal – third place	2025 Lousada	Team
Representing Scotland
Nations Cup 2
Gold medal – first place	2025 Muscat	Team

Keir Robb (born 19 January 2002) is a Scottish field hockey player who has represented Scotland and won a bronze medal at the Men's EuroHockey Championship II.

== Biography ==
Robb was educated at Grove Academy and studied Medicine and Surgery at the University of Edinburgh. He began playing hockey as a junior for the Grove Menzieshill Hockey Club and continued to play for them until his University days.

He made his Scotland debut in 2023 and played for Edinburgh University Hockey Club, as well as appearing for Inverleith Hockey Club in the Scottish Hockey Premiership.

In 2023, he helped Scotland win the bronze medal at the 2023 Men's EuroHockey Championship II in Dublin and in August 2024, he was part of the men's squad for their EuroHockey Championship qualifier in Vienna

In February 2025, he was part of the men's squad for 2024–25 Men's FIH Hockey Nations Cup 2 in Muscat, Oman, and helped the team win the gold medal and a few months later, he helped Scotland win the bronze medal at the 2025 Men's EuroHockey Championship II in Lousada, Portugal, defeating Italy in the third place play off.
