= Stephen Theobald =

British field hockey player

Personal information
- Born: 22 August 1923 Hitchin, England
- Died: 19 February 2006 (aged 82) Devon, England

Sport
- Sport: Field hockey
- Position: Forward/winger
Senior career
Years	Team	Caps	Goals
1949–1950	Edinburgh University	-	-
1951	Long Ashton	-	-
1952	Devizes	-	-
National team
Years	Team	Caps	Goals
1951–1952	Great Britain	2	-
–	Scotland		-
Medal record
Men's field hockey
Representing Great Britain
Bronze medal – third place	1952 Helsinki	Team competition

Stephen Thompson Theobald (22 August 1923 – 19 February 2006) was a British field hockey player who competed in the 1952 Summer Olympics. He was a member of the British field hockey team which won the bronze medal.

== Biography ==
Theobald was born in Hitchin, the son of a bank manager. He was educated at Haileybury School, where he played hockey, rugby and cricket and studied at the University of Edinburgh.

It was during his time at Edinburgh that he played for Edinburgh University Men's Hockey Club and was called up to represent Scotland.

He played his club hockey for Long Ashton and then Devizes Hockey Club.

He was selected for the Great Britain tour of South Africa in 1951. and made his Great Britain debut on 8 September 1951.

Theobald received the call up for the Olympics in May 1952. He subsequently represented Great Britain in the field hockey tournament at the 1952 Olympic Games in Helsinki, although he had to settle for being an unused substitute.
