= Calum Douglas =

Scottish field hockey player

Personal information
- Born: 25 March 2005 (age 21) Scotland

Sport
- Sport: Field hockey
- Position: Goalkeeper
Senior career
Years	Team	Caps	Goals
2022–2024	Clydesdale	-	-
2024–2025	Southgate	-	-
2025–2026	Surbiton	-	-
National team
Years	Team	Caps	Goals
–	Scotland	21	-
Medal record
Representing Scotland
European Championship II
Bronze medal – third place	2025 Lousada	Team
Nations Cup 2
Gold medal – first place	2025 Muscat	Team

Calum Douglas (born 25 March 2005) is a Scottish field hockey player who has represented Scotland and won a bronze medal at the Men's EuroHockey Championship II.

== Biography ==
Douglas was educated at the Glasgow School of Sport. He played club hockey in the Scottish National Leagues for Clydesdale before signing for Southgate Hockey Club in the Men's England Hockey League.

In August 2024, he was part of the men's squad for their EuroHockey Championship qualifier in Vienna and was also added to the Great Britain Hockey centralised programme in 2024.

In February 2025, he was part of the men's squad for 2024–25 Men's FIH Hockey Nations Cup 2 in Muscat, Oman, and helped the team win the gold medal

In May 2025, Douglas signed for Surbiton Hockey Club for the 2025–26 season from Southgate. Shortly afterwards, he helped Scotland win the bronze medal at the 2025 Men's EuroHockey Championship II in Lousada, Portugal, defeating Italy in the third place play off.

== Family ==
His brother is fellow hockey international Ali Douglas.
