= Edinburgh University Hockey Club =

Field hockey club in Edinburgh, Scotland

- Full name: Edinburgh University Hockey Club
- Nickname(s): The Gamblers, The Unay, Uni
- League: Scottish Hockey: Premiership; Regional League 1 Regional League 2 East District: East 1; 3 BUCS: Premier National; Scotland 1; 2; 3; 4
- Founded: 1901; 125 years ago
- Home ground: VK Peffermill Arena, Peffermill Playing Fields, Edinburgh, Scotland (Capacity 4999)

Personnel
- President: F. "Kilo" Kelly-Greaves (2025/26)
- Vice President: T. "Tandy" Anderton (2025/26)
- Coach: Neil Allan (Head of Performance Men's Hockey) (2024–)

Affiliation
- University: The University of Edinburgh
- Institution: Edinburgh University Sports Union
- Website: men's official website women's official website

Edinburgh University Hockey Club are the official men's and women's field hockey clubs for The University of Edinburgh. It comprises seven men's teams and ten women's teams and was founded in 1901.

Both the men's and women's first XI play in the highest tier in Scotland, the Scottish Hockey Premiership. Teams plays in regional Saturday league matches across eastern districts of Scotland, with some teams participating in extra leagues on a Wednesday afternoon in their respective British Universities & Colleges Sport (BUCS) league, playing other universities in Scotland and across the UK.

Home games are played at Peffermill playing fields (also known as The Cauldron, Peffs, and The VK Peffermill Arena), which are water-based pitches located in southern Edinburgh. Training takes place at Peffermill on Monday and Thursday evenings for all teams. These pitches are of an international standard.

The club is sponsored by Gibson & Kerr and Logic Programming Associates.

== History ==
The first known photograph of Edinburgh University Hockey Club

The first mention of hockey at the university was in 1899, when a notice was published in the Student, which read "Would those in favour of starting a Hockey Club in connection with the University kindly forward their names and addresses to the Secretary, Hockey Club, University PO?" One of these founding members was G.M. Melville.

There is no further mention of the club until 1901 when pitches were secured at Craiglockhart and play commenced. On 18 November that year the University Hockey Club as represented that year at the meeting of clubs in Scotland when it was agreed to form a Scottish Hockey Association, making the club a founding member of the modern association. The first match was played against Dumbarton and it was lost with the rest of the season recording 11 played, won 4, lost 5 and drawn 2. By the end of the season a second XI was started.

The club was admitted to the University Athletic Club (now the Sports Union) in 1902 when W. Sibbald Robertson was the captain and in that year five University players were recorded internationalists. T.P Caverhill was one of these five. In the 1905–1906 season out of sixteen matches played, twelve were won, three drawn and one lost. One member of this team, Frank Fasson, a former internationalist rugby player, took a dislike to his opposing number and slashed his stick against the man's shins. The next week Frank had a tooth ache and went to the dentist and much to his dismay found that his dentist consultant was his opponent. However Dr N.L. Stevenson took neither advantage nor a fee. It was Fasson who was playing later that season when Scotland secured the first Scottish victory when playing against the Welsh; the result was 3–1.

The best season in the club was recorded in 1908–1909 when the first XI was unbeaten and six of the squad were chosen to represent Scotland. It was around this time that toy rabbits first appeared in the team photos as mascots of the club.

Like most sports, the First World War halted hockey matches although the club was re-established for the 1919–1920 season. The growth in the sport meant that in the following season, five teams were fielded for the university. For the 1922/23 season, the first Blues officially recognised by Edinburgh University Sports Union was awarded to J J B Martin.

The club suffered a dry spell for victories until 1930-1931 when the competition for places on the teams was so great that inter-society matches were organised. This successful season saw the first touring side to go down to English Universities and victories were recorded against both Durham and Manchester. It is also in this season that the Scottish Inter University Championship was first recorded which Edinburgh won which was followed the next season with the first tour to Ireland. This continued with the Scottish Championships residing with Edinburgh University until the 1938–1939 season, the last before the Second World War.

There was no shortage of matches to be found during the war this time with 20 matches recorded each season. It is the 1942–1943 season which saw the first incarnation of the Scottish university teams play the United Services with no less than six Edinburgh men in the team. Much of the success gained by the team was attributed to club captain Emmanuel Evans-Anfom. In the history up to 1959, the club recorded a total of 32 full internationalists and one (Stephen Theobald) who represented Great Britain at the 1952 Summer Olympics and between these players they recorded 183 international caps.

In the British Universities & Colleges Sport, the 1st XI won Scottish 1A during the 2011/12 season.

In the 2012/13 season player-coach Graham Moodie stepped up to coach the 1st XI, becoming the club's Head of Performance. He led the team to several Scottish Cup Finals in 2015, 2016 and 2018. In August 2021, Moodie was replaced by Scottish international Hamish Imrie.

In 2021/22, the club increased membership to over 190, making it the largest men's university sports club in the United Kingdom. The 1XI continued to be one of the only men's university hockey club in the UK to actively compete for EHL qualification.

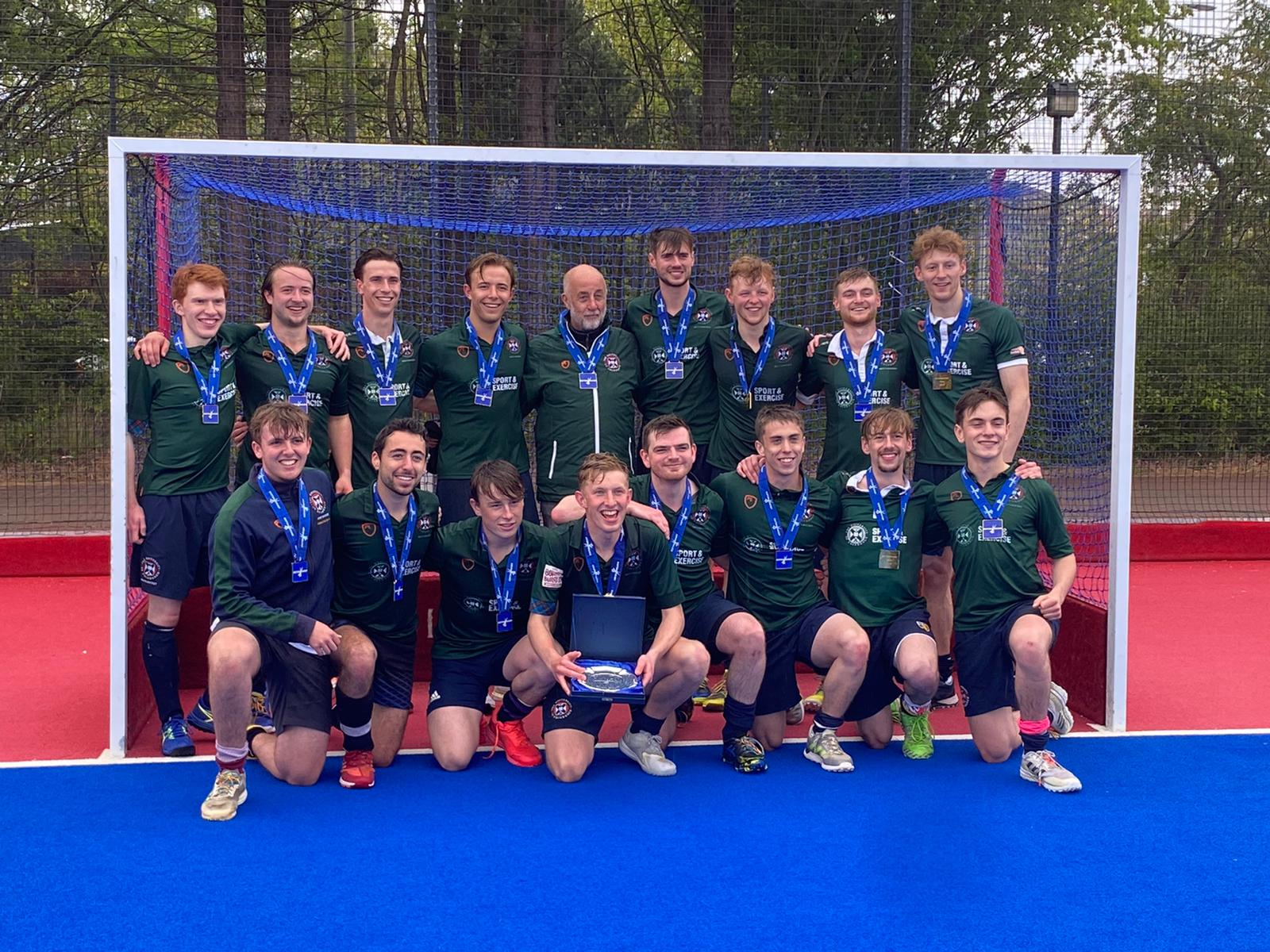
EUMHC 2nd XI of the 2021/22 Golden Season - BUCS Scotland 1 Champions, Scottish Hockey Regional League Champions, Scottish Hockey District Cup Champions

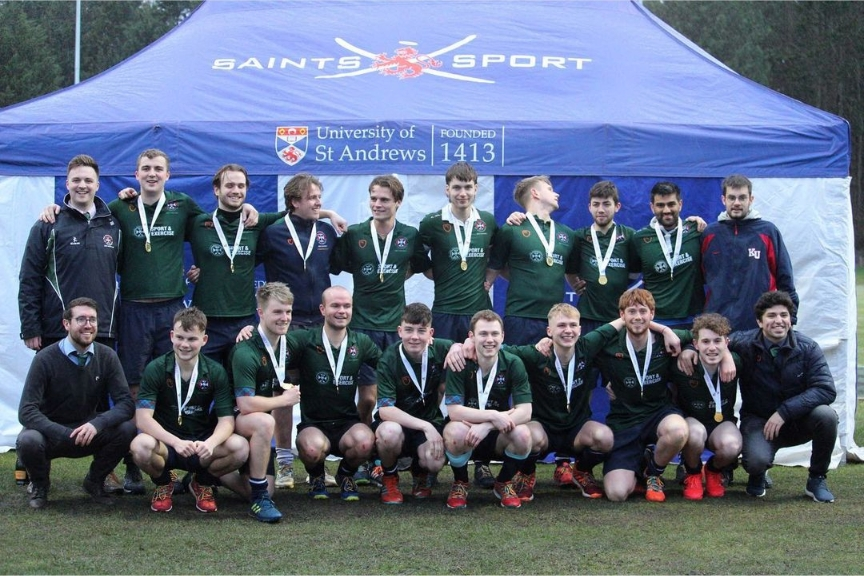
EUMHC 3rd XI of the 2021/22 Golden Season - BUCS Scottish Cup Champions, BUCS Scotland 2 Champions, Scottish Reserve Cup Champions

In 2022, the 1st XI were promoted to the top flight of BUCS Men's Hockey for the first time and they won the BUCS National Vase, while the 2nd XI won BUCS Scotland 1 and the 3rd XI won BUCS Scotland 2 and Conference Cup and the 5th XI won East District 1. At the end of April 2022, the 2nd XI won the regional league, the highest competitive men's league in Scotland for non-first teams, while the 2nd XI and 3rd XI finished off the season with two club trebles, when the 2nd XI won the District Cup and the 3rd XI won the Reserve Cup.

In 2022/23, the club expanded its number of teams from seven to eight and defended their BUCS Scotland 1 title after a victory against Strathclyde 1s at The Cauldron. The 1st XI successfully achieved back-to-back BUCS Big Wednesday appearances after winning against Exeter University Hockey Club 2nd XI at The Nandos in Exeter.

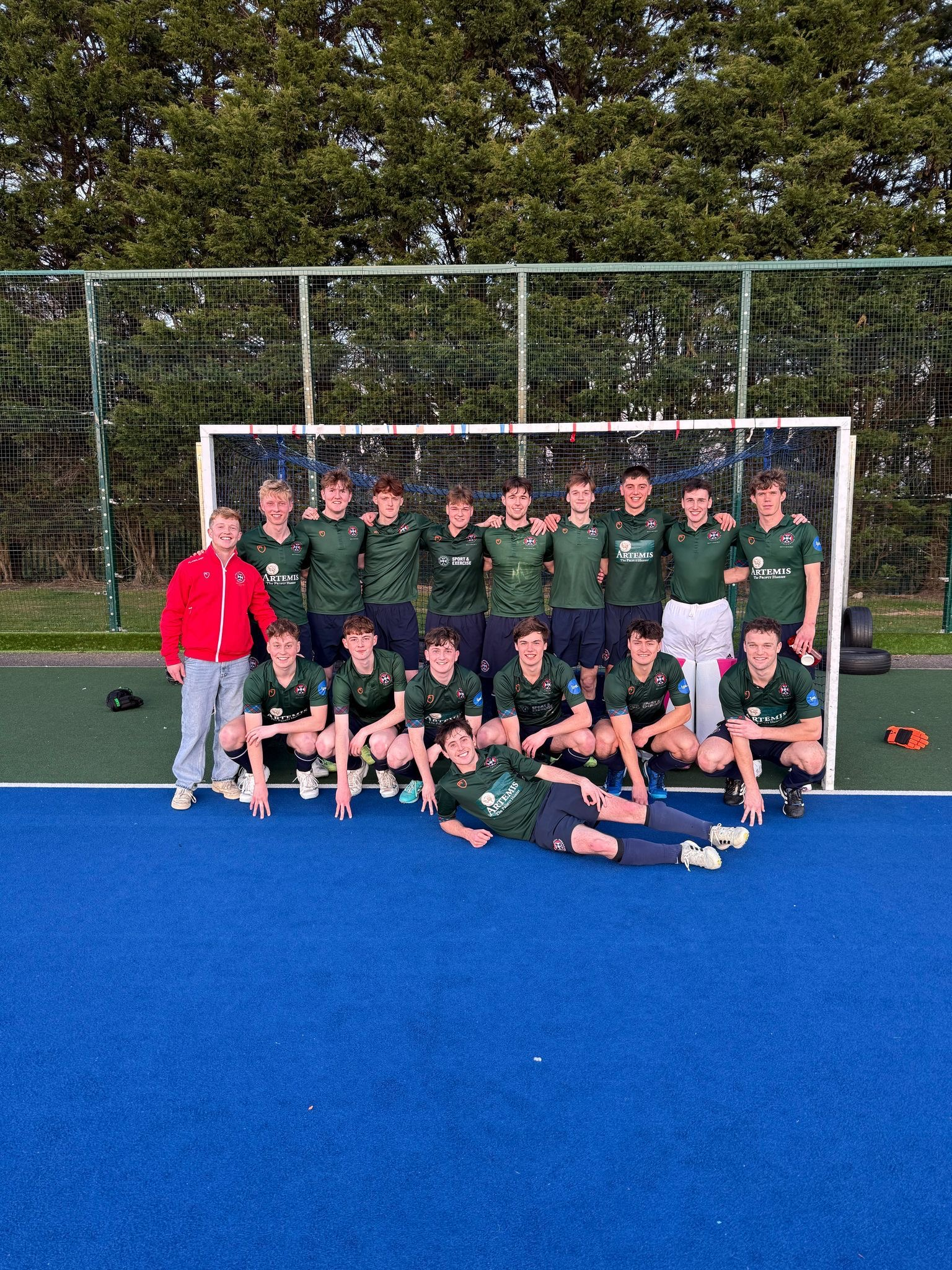
EUMHC 1XI after beating Cardiff Met 1XI 3-4 away in a playoff match to gain promotion back into BUCS Premier National. 26 March 2025

During the 2024/25 season, the men's first XI won the Scottish Hockey Cup for the first time in the club's history and became the first male university side to win the Scottish Cup after beating Hillhead Hockey Club 3-1 in the final. The team also went undefeated in all BUCS games, clinching the BUCS North Prem title and earning promotion to the BUCS Premiership and won the BUCS National Vase for the third time. They subsequently won the BUCS team of the year award.

== Notable players ==
=== Men's internationals ===
The following list are players who have represented their country and level during their time as members of Edinburgh University Men's Hockey Club, or represented shortly after leaving the club. (Scottish unless stated).

- T.P Caverhill
- Daniel Coultas
- Jamie Croll
- Robbie Croll
- Callum Duke
- Calum Douglas
- (Cyprus) Antonis Efthymiou
- Frank Fasson
- David Forrester
- Hew Fraser
- Jamie Golden
- Hamish Imrie
- (Cyprus) Christodoulos Karankannas
- Alexander Marsland
- Iain McFadden
- Alistair McGregor
- Graham Moodie
- Ian Moodie
- Keir Robb
- John Stephen
- (Cyprus) Constantinos Stylianou
- Matthew Taylor
- Stephen Theobald
- Hugh Walker
- James Wong

== Honours ==
- Scottish Cup (2024/25)
- Scottish Regional 1 League (2023/24, 2024/25)
- Scottish East District 1 (2021/22)

== Club songs and chants ==
- The Gambler by Kenny Rogers
- Baywatch Theme
- Stay Another Day by East 17
- Don't Stop Believing by Journey

== See also ==
- Scottish Hockey
- British Universities and Colleges Sport
