= Ian Moodie =

Scottish field hockey player

Personal information
- Born: 18 July 1990 (age 36)

Sport
- Sport: Field hockey
- Position: Forward
Senior career
Years	Team	Caps	Goals
2008–2015	Western Wildcats	-	-
2015–2020	Edinburgh Univ	-	-
National team
Years	Team	Caps	Goals
2012–2014	Scotland	42	(9)

Ian R. Moodie (born 18 July 1990) is a Scottish former field hockey player who represented the Scotland men's national field hockey team at the 2014 Commonwealth Games.

== Biography ==
Moodie competed with his brothers Alan and Graham for the East of U18 and U15 teams respectively and played for Western Wildcats Hockey Club in the Scottish Hockey Premiership.

While at Western, he gained his first Scotland cap versus Spain in 2012 and was voted Western player of the year for 2012/2013.

He continued to play for the Wildcats and in June 2014, was selected as a member of Team Scotland for the men's tournament at the 2014 Commonwealth Games in Glasgow.

He switched from Western to Edinburgh University Hockey Club for the 2015/16 season. and played for them for several years.
