= Andrew McConnell =

Scottish field hockey player

Personal information
- Born: 5 January 2000 (age 26) Scotland

Sport
- Sport: Field hockey
- Position: Defender
Senior career
Years	Team	Caps	Goals
2010–2023	Western Wildcats	-	-
2023–2025	Harvestehuder THC	-	-
2026 - current	Old Georgians Hockey Club	-	-
National team
Years	Team	Caps	Goals
7	Scotland	56	(12)
Medal record
Representing Scotland
European Championship II
Silver medal – second place	2021 Gniezno	Team
Bronze medal – third place	2023 Dublin	Team
Bronze medal – third place	2025 Lousada	Team
Nations Cup 2
Gold medal – first place	2025 Muscat	Team

Andrew McConnell (born 5 January 2000) is a Scottish field hockey player who has represented Scotland at the Commonwealth Games and has won three medals at the Men's EuroHockey Championship II.

== Biography ==
McConnell played club hockey for Western Wildcats Hockey Club in the Scottish Hockey Premiership, a club he joined as a junior in 2010. While at Western he represented Scotland at the 2022 Commonwealth Games in Birmingham.

In 2021, he helped Scotland win the silver medal at the 2021 Men's EuroHockey Championship II in Gniezno, Poland and in 2023, he helped Scotland win the bronze medal at the 2023 Men's EuroHockey Championship II in Dublin.

After spending well over a decade with Western he signed for German team Harvestehuder THC.

In August 2024, he was part of the men's squad for their EuroHockey Championship qualifier in Vienna.

In February 2025, he was part of the men's squad for 2024–25 Men's FIH Hockey Nations Cup 2 in Muscat, Oman, and helped the team win the gold medal and a few months later, he helped Scotland win the bronze medal at the 2025 Men's EuroHockey Championship II in Lousada, Portugal, defeating Italy in the third place play off.
