= Struan Walker =

Scottish field hockey player

Personal information
- Born: 6 July 2002 (age 24) Glasgow, Scotland

Sport
- Sport: Field hockey
- Position: Forward
- Club: Oranje-Rood
Senior career
Years	Team	Caps	Goals
–2020	Clydesdale	-	-
2020–2023	Club an der Alster	-	-
2023–2025	Surbiton	-	-
2024–2025	Team Gonasika	-	-
2025–present	Oranje-Rood	-	-
National team
Years	Team	Caps	Goals
2019	Scotland U21	5	(2)
2021–present	Scotland	51	(48)
2023–present	Great Britain	6	(2)
Medal record
Representing Scotland
European Championship II
Bronze medal – third place	2025 Lousada	Team
Nations Cup 2
Gold medal – first place	2025 Muscat	Team

Struan Robert Walker (born 6 July 2002) is a Scottish field hockey player who plays as a forward for Dutch Hoofdklasse club Oranje-Rood and the Scotland and Great Britain national teams.

== Biography ==
Struan Walker grew up in Glasgow, Scotland and was educated at Hutchesons' Grammar School. He has cited his main idols as Scotland’s Alan Forsyth and NWA.

Walker came through the youth ranks of Clydesdale. He made his junior international debut for the Scotland U–21 team in 2019, representing the team at the EuroHockey Junior Championship II in Plžen Litice, where he won a gold medal. In 2020, he moved to Germany to play for Der Club an der Alster.

Walker made his senior international debut for Scotland in 2021, representing the team at the EuroHockey Championship II in Gniezno, where he won a silver medal.

He made his first appearance at a major tournament in 2022, representing Scotland at the Commonwealth Games in Birmingham. In 2023 he was named in the Great Britain squad, making his debut during season five of the FIH Pro League. He also played in the European Qualifier for the FIH World Cup in Cardiff.

Since 2023 he competes in the English Hockey League for Surbiton. Walker was part of the Surbiton team that won the league title during the 2024–25 Men's England Hockey League season.

In February 2025, he was part of the men's squad for 2024–25 Men's FIH Hockey Nations Cup 2 in Muscat, Oman, and helped the team win the gold medal and a few months later, he finished as top scorer and helped Scotland win the bronze medal at the 2025 Men's EuroHockey Championship II in Lousada, Portugal, defeating Italy in the third place play off.

He joined Dutch club HC Oranje-Rood for the 2025–26 season.
