= Ben Nelson (field hockey) =

Irish field hockey player

Personal information
- Full name: Ben Nelson
- Born: 2 February 2000 (age 26) Ireland

Sport
- Sport: Field hockey
- Position: Forward
- Club: Lisnagarvey
National team
Years	Team	Caps	Goals
2021–	Ireland	24	(7)
Medal record
Men's field hockey
Representing Ireland
EuroHockey Championship II
Bronze medal – third place	2021 Gniezno

Ben Nelson (born 2 February 2000) is a field hockey player from Ireland.

== Personal life ==
Nelson has an older brother, Matthew, who also represents Ireland internationally in field hockey.

== Field hockey ==
=== Domestic league ===
In the Irish Hockey League, Nelson represents Lisnagarvey Hockey Club.

=== Senior national team ===
Nelson made his senior international debut for Ireland in 2021. He earned his first senior cap at the EuroHockey Championship II in Gniezno, where he won a bronze medal.

Following his debut, Nelson did not return to the national squad in 2024. He competed throughout the 2024–25 FIH Pro League season, finishing as Ireland's second highest scorer. He has most recently been named in the squad for the 2025 EuroHockey Championship II in Lousada.
