= David Nairn =

Scottish field hockey player

Personal information
- Born: 30 June 2000 (age 26) Glasgow, Scotland

Sport
- Sport: Field hockey
- Position: Midfield/Forward
Senior career
Years	Team	Caps	Goals
2015–2022	Clydesdale	-	-
2022–2025	Grange	-	-
National team
Years	Team	Caps	Goals
–	Scotland	31	(3)
Medal record
Representing Scotland
Bronze medal – third place	2025 Lousada	Team
Nations Cup 2
Gold medal – first place	2025 Muscat	Team

David Nairn (born 30 June 2000) is a Scottish field hockey player who has represented Scotland and won a bronze medal at the Men's EuroHockey Championship II.

== Biography ==
Nairn, born in Glasgow, was educated at Hutchesons' Grammar School and studied Accounting and Finance at the University of Glasgow from 2018 to 2022.

He played club hockey for Clydesdale before joining Grange Hockey Club in the Scottish Hockey Premiership but missed most of the 23/24 season with a foot injury. In August 2024, was part of the men's squad for their EuroHockey Championship qualifier in Vienna.

In February 2025, he was part of the men's squad for 2024–25 Men's FIH Hockey Nations Cup 2 in Muscat, Oman, and helped the team win the gold medal and a few months later, he helped Scotland win the bronze medal at the 2025 Men's EuroHockey Championship II in Lousada, Portugal, defeating Italy in the third place play off.

Nairn has workd for PwC since 2022.
