= Cameron Golden =

Scottish field hockey player

Personal information
- Born: 2 June 1999 (age 27) Dundee, Scotland

Sport
- Sport: Field hockey
- Position: Forward
Senior career
Years	Team	Caps	Goals
–	Uhlenhorster HC	-	-
National team
Years	Team	Caps	Goals
2017–2019	Scotland U–21	9	(8)
2017–2018	Great Britain U–21	12	(7)
2018–	Scotland	51	(27)
Medal record
Men's field hockey
Representing Scotland
EuroHockey Championship II
Silver medal – second place	2021 Gniezno	Team
Representing Great Britain
Sultan of Johor Cup
Gold medal – first place	2018 Johor Bahru	Team
Silver medal – second place	2017 Johor Bahru	Team

Cameron Golden (born 2 June 1999) is a field hockey player from Scotland, who plays as a forward.

== Biography ==
Golden was born and raised in Dundee, Scotland. His younger brother, Jamie, also represents Scotland in hockey.

Golden made his debut for the Scotland U–21 side at the 2017 EuroHockey Junior Championship II in St. Petersburg. Following his Scotland junior debut, Golden went on to represent the Great Britain junior side and appeared at the 2017 Sultan of Johor Cup, winning silver and then took gold at the 2018 Sultan of Johor Cup in Johor Bahru.

Golden made his Scottish senior international debut in 2018 and captained the Scotland junior team to a gold medal at the EuroHockey Junior Championship tier 2 in Plzeň.

In 2019, Golden joined Dutch club Klein Zwitserland before joining German club Uhlenhorster HC the following year. He medalled with the Scottish senior team for the first time in 2021, taking home silver at the EuroHockey Championship II in Gniezno.

In 2022, Golden was named in the squad for the 2022 Commonwealth Games in Birmingham.
