= Jamie Golden =

Scottish field hockey player

Personal information
- Born: 24 December 2001 (age 24) Dundee, Scotland

Sport
- Sport: Field hockey
- Position: Midfielder
Senior career
Years	Team	Caps	Goals
–2020	Grove Menzieshill	-	-
2020–2022	Surbiton	-	-
2022–2023	Beeston	-	-
2023–2024	Hamburger	-	-
2024–present	Western Wildcats	-	-
National team
Years	Team	Caps	Goals
2021–	Scotland	46	(51)
Medal record
Representing Scotland
European Championship II
Bronze medal – third place	2023 Dublin	Team
Bronze medal – third place	2025 Lousada	Team
Nations Cup 2
Gold medal – first place	2025 Muscat	Team

Jamie Golden (born 24 December 2001) is a Scottish field hockey player who plays as a midfielder for the Western Wildcats and the Scotland national team.

== Biography ==
Golden was born and raised in Dundee, Scotland. His older brother, Cameron, also represents Scotland in hockey.

Golden broke through the youth setup of Grove Menzieshill and eventually joined the senior team where he played until his departure in 2020. Golden made his debut for the Scotland U–21 side at the EuroHockey Junior Championship II in Plzeň, where he won a gold medal. Following his Scotland junior debut, Golden went on to represent the Great Britain U21 side, winning gold at the 2019 Sultan of Johor Cup.

In 2020, he moved to England to join Surbiton. While at Surbiton he made his senior Scottish international debut in 2021 and was selected to represent Scotland at the 2022 Commonwealth Games in Birmingham. He also played in the 2022 Sultan of Johor Cup in Johor Bahru, winning bronze.

Following his time at Surbiton, Golden transferred to Beeston in the 2022–2023 season. In 2023, Golden made a move to Germany, joining Hamburger Polo Club in the Bundesliga.

In 2024, Golden returned to Scotland to join Western Wildcats.

In February 2025, he was part of the men's squad for 2024–25 Men's FIH Hockey Nations Cup 2 in Muscat, Oman, and helped the team win the gold medal and a few months later, he helped Scotland win the bronze medal at the 2025 Men's EuroHockey Championship II in Lousada, Portugal, defeating Italy in the third place play off.
