= Tai Beng Hai =

Malaysian field hockey player (born 1965)

Personal information
- Nationality: Malaysian
- Born: 14 July 1965 (age 60)

Sport
- Sport: Field hockey
Medal record
Men's field hockey
Representing Malaysia
Asian Games
| Bronze medal – third place | 1990 Beijing | Team |

Tai Beng Hai (born 14 July 1965) is a Malaysian field hockey player. He competed in the men's tournament at the 1992 Summer Olympics.
