= Ho Koh Chye =

Malaysian field hockey player

Personal information
- Born: 5 November 1942 Seremban
- Died: 3 December 2008 (aged 66) Petaling Jaya

Chinese name
- Chinese: 何科才
- Hanyu Pinyin: Hé Kēcái

Sport
- Sport: Field hockey
Medal record
Men's field hockey
Representing Malaya
Asian Games
Bronze medal – third place	1962 Jakarta	Team

Dato Ho Koh Chye (5 November 1942 – 3 December 2008) was a Malaysian Olympic field hockey goalie. Once ranked the finest goalie in the world. His name is etched in the Malaysian Hall of Fame for posterity.

Ho represented the Malaysian hockey team in the 1962 Asian Games in Jakarta, in Tokyo during the 1964 Summer Olympics, the 1966 Asian Games in Bangkok, and was the hockey team captain at the 1968 Summer Olympics in Mexico City.

Ho also coached the Malaysian squad to a fourth placing in the 1975 World Cup in Kuala Lumpur, the national hockey team's best-ever result to date.

His last post before retiring in 1992 was International Preparation Division director. He had also served as the deputy contingent head to the Asian Games in Hiroshima in 1994. Dato Ho was Malaysian Chef-de-Mission to the Beijing Olympics in August 2008.

Ho died on 3 December 2008.
