= Western Wildcats Hockey Club =

Scottish field hockey club

Western Wildcats
- Full name: Western Wildcats Hockey Club
- League: Scottish Hockey Premiership
- Founded: 1898
- Home ground: Milngavie and Bearsden Sports Club, Auchenhowie Road
- Website: Official website
Home	Away

The Western Wildcats Hockey Club is a field hockey club that is based at the Milngavie and Bearsden Sports Club in Milngavie, Scotland. The men's section has five teams and the women's section has four teams. Additionally there are occasional games for a veteran side.

== History ==
Founded in 1898, Western held their first AGM on 25 March 1899. Established originally in the West End of Glasgow, the club played hockey in that district for 70 years, during which time they never succeeded in finding a permanent ground which they could call their home. Nevertheless, they maintained their position as a prominent club in the West of Scotland and were highly regarded throughout Scotland. From the earliest times they provided many Scottish internationalists. In 1900 the club joined the newly formed West of Scotland Association.

After the second World War the club continued to prosper, fielding four teams regularly every weekend. But it was in 1968 that the major change occurred when the club became a fully integrated part of Milngavie and Bearsden Sports Club. This was a step of great significance, providing financial stability to the Sports Club and a permanent home for Western.

With the requirement that top class hockey be played on artificial surfaces the first privately owned artificial hockey pitch was laid at Auchenhowie in 1994 providing facilities to Western players and contributing significantly to the improvement of playing standards throughout the club.

The men's first XI won the Scottish Cup for the first time in 1986 and became champions of Scotland for the first time when they won National League 1 in 1997 and embarked on five consecutive league title wins from 1997 to 2001. Further league title success came in 2003 and 2004 to add to eight more Scottish Cup wins from 1996 to 2011.

In 2002, the club formed a women's section.

Kelburne Hockey Club emerged as the club's main rival in 2006 and restricted Western's success but in 2022 they achieved the league and cup double. In 2025 the club won league title number 9.

== Honours ==
=== Domestic ===
- Scottish League championships: 1997, 1998, 1999, 2000, 2001, 2003, 2004, 2022, 2025
- Scottish Indoor League Championships: 2019, 2022, 2023
- Scottish Hockey Cup winners: 1986, 1996, 1998, 1999, 2000, 2003, 2004, 2005, 2011, 2022, 2023
- League Cup Winners: 2002

=== Europe ===
- C Divn League: 1998
- B Divn League: 2000, 2003, 2004, 2007

== Notable players ==
=== Men's internationals ===
Extended content

Player	Events/Notes	Ref
(Scotland) Thomas Austin	EC (2025)	
(Scotland) Callum Duke	CG (2022)	
(Scotland) Graham Dunlop	Oly (2004), CG (2006)	
(Scotland) Jamie Golden	EC (2025)	
(Scotland) Rob Harwood	CG (2018, 2022), EC (2021, 2025)	
(Scotland) Andrew Lochrin	EC (2023, 2025)	
(Scotland) David Mansouri	CG (2006)	
(Scotland) Vishal Marwaha	CG (2006, 2010)	
(Scotland) Andrew McAllister	EC (2025)	
(Scotland) Andrew McConnell	CG (2022)	
(Scotland) Neil Menzies	1984–1998	
(Scotland) Graham Moodie	Oly (2004)	
(Scotland) Ian Moodie	CG (2014)	
(Scotland) Hugh Neilson	1913	
(Scotland) Douglas Simpson	CG (2006)	

Key

- Oly = Olympic Games
- CG = Commonwealth Games
- WC = World Cup
- CT = Champions Trophy
- EC = European Championships
