= Scotland men's national field hockey team =

Scotland
- Association: Scottish Hockey
- Confederation: EHF (Europe)
- Head Coach: Neil Allan
- Assistant coach(es): Luke Stone
- Manager: Joanne Holmes
- Captain: Rob Field
Home	Away

FIH ranking
- Current: 16 ▼2 (6 November 2026)

Olympic Games
- Appearances: 1 (first in 1908)
- Best result: 3rd (1908)

EuroHockey Championship
- Appearances: 10 (first in 1970)
- Best result: 7th (1974, 1983, 2019)
Medal record
Olympic Games
Bronze medal – third place	1908 London	Team

The Scotland men's national field hockey team represents Scotland in men's international field hockey competitions, with the exception of the Olympic Games when Scottish players are eligible to play for the Great Britain men's national field hockey team. Prior to the formation of the Great Britain team in 1920, Scotland competed at the 1908 Summer Olympics in London, sharing the bronze medal with Wales.

== Tournament history ==
Scotland have played in 27 competitions from the EuroHockey Championship to the Commonwealth Games etc. However Scotland have never qualified for the biggest hockey competition, the Men's FIH Hockey World Cup. Being one of the highest ranked teams never to do so.

=== Summer Olympics ===
- 1908 – (bronze)

=== EuroHockey Championship ===
EuroHockey Championship record
Year	Round	Position	Pld	W	D *	L	GF	GA
(Belgium) 1970	15th place game	15th	7	2	0	5	5	8
(Spain) 1974	7th place game	7th	7	4	0	3	13	15
(West Germany) 1978	11th place game	11th	7	2	1	4	8	13
(Netherlands) 1983	7th place game	7th	7	2	2	3	11	14
(Soviet Union) 1987	7th place game	8th	7	1	3	3	10	19
(France) 1991	did not qualify							
(Republic of Ireland) 1995	9th place game	10th	7	1	1	5	8	19
(Italy) 1999	did not qualify							
(Spain) 2003	7th place game	8th	7	3	1	3	12	14
(Germany) 2005	7th place game	8th	5	1	1	3	10	15
(England) 2007	did not qualify							
(Netherlands) 2009	did not qualify							
(Germany) 2011	did not qualify							
(Belgium) 2013	did not qualify							
(England) 2015	did not qualify							
(Netherlands) 2017	did not qualify							
(Belgium) 2019	Group stage	7th	5	1	1	3	7	23
(Netherlands) 2021	did not qualify							
(Germany) 2023	did not qualify							
(Germany) 2025	did not qualify							
(England) 2027	Qualified							
Total	Best: 7th	10/20	59	17	10	32	84	140

=== EuroHockey Championship II ===
- 2007 – (bronze)
- 2009 – 5th place
- 2011 – (bronze)
- 2013 – 6th place
- 2015 – (bronze)
- 2017 – (gold)
- 2021 – (silver)
- 2023 – (bronze)
- 2025 – (bronze)

=== Commonwealth Games ===
- 2006 – 7th place
- 2010 – 9th place
- 2014 – 8th place
- 2018 – 6th place
- 2022 – 9th place

=== Hockey World League ===
- 2012–13 – 24th place
- 2016–17 – 19th place

=== FIH Hockey Series ===
- 2018–19 – Second round

=== FIH Hockey Nations Cup II ===
- 2024–25 – 1st place

=== FIH Hockey Nations Cup ===
- 2025–26 – 6th place
- 2026–27 – Qualified

=== Champions Challenge II ===
- 2011 – 4th place

== Players ==
=== Current squad ===
This was the squad for Scotland's most recent competition. The 2025 Men's EuroHockey Championship II.

Head coach: Jonny Caren

No.	Pos.	Player	Date of birth (age)	Caps	Club
2	DF	Andrew Lochrin	18 March 2001 (age 25)	22	(Scotland) Western Wildcats
3	DF	Andrew McAllister	27 April 2001 (age 25)	15	(Scotland) Western Wildcats
6	FW	Ali Douglas	13 November 2003 (age 23)	21	(England) Holcombe
8	MF	Rob Field (Captain)	14 April 1994 (age 32)	43	(England) Holcombe
9	FW	Andrew McConnell	5 January 2000 (age 26)	40	(Germany) Harvestehuder THC
10	FW	Rob Harwood	15 July 1997 (age 29)	50	(Scotland) Western Wildcats
13	FW	Struan Walker	6 July 2002 (age 24)	40	(England) Surbiton
20	MF	Jamie Golden	24 December 2001 (age 24)	35	(Scotland) Western Wildcats
21	FW	David Nairn	30 June 2000 (age 26)	21	(Scotland) Grange
22	GK	Calum Douglas	25 March 2005 (age 21)	15	(England) Surbiton
24	DF	Jamie Croll	7 January 2004 (age 22)	12	(Scotland) Edinburgh Univ
25	FW	Jamie Green	1 October 2005 (age 21)	6	(Scotland) Grange
29	FW	Keir Robb	19 January 2002 (age 24)	21	(Scotland) Edinburgh Univ
30	MF	Thomas Austin	20 April 2007 (age 19)	22	(Scotland) Western Wildcats
32	DF	Callum Mackenzie	31 December 1998 (age 27)	59	(England) Wimbledon
33	GK	Matthew Taylor	25 April 2001 (age 25)	1	(Scotland) Edinburgh Univ
34	FW	Alasdair Richmond	6 August 2000 (age 26)	13	(England) Beeston
36	FW	Iain McFadden	26 March 2002 (age 24)	11	(Scotland) Edinburgh Univ

=== Recent call-ups ===
The following players were called up for 2025 Nations Cup II.

No.	Pos.	Player	Date of birth (age)	Caps	Club
12	MF	Craig Falconer	6 September 1993 (age 33)	43	(England) Brooklands
39	FW	Ben Galloway	8 February 2004 (age 22)	6	(England) Exeter Univ

== Results and fixtures ==
The following is a list of match results from 1 January 2026 to 31 December 2026. As well as any future matches that have been scheduled.

Win Draw Loss Fixture

=== 2026 ===
==== 2026 FIH World Cup Qualifiers ====
01 March 2026 GS	France	2–3	Scotland	Santiago, Chile
16:30	Xavier 5'; Charlet 20'	Report	J. Golden 25'; C. Golden 27', 30'	Stadium: Estadio Nacional del Hockey Césped Claudia Schüler

03 March 2026 GS	Scotland	2–2	Chile	Santiago, Chile
20:15	J. Golden 35'; Walker 54'	Report	Wolansky 32'; Amoroso 54'	Stadium: Estadio Nacional del Hockey Césped Claudia Schüler

04 March 2026 GS	Scotland	0–5	Wales	Santiago, Chile
18:00		Report	Pritchard 4'; Newbold 10', 38'; Hutchinson 28'; Welsh 43'	Stadium: Estadio Nacional del Hockey Césped Claudia Schüler

06 March 2026 Crossover	Scotland	8–2	South Korea	Santiago, Chile
12:45	J. Golden 3', 35', 52'; Walker 4', 5', 18', 49'; McConnell 43'	Report	Lim 11'; Cheon 13'	Stadium: Estadio Nacional del Hockey Césped Claudia Schüler

07 March 2026 Fifth and sixth place	Scotland	5–1	Canada	Santiago, Chile
15:45	J. Golden 21', 26', 34', 36'; Douglas 59'	Report	Sarmento 38'	Stadium: Estadio Nacional del Hockey Césped Claudia Schüler

==== 2026 FIH Nations Cup ====
11 June 2026 Pool A	Malaysia	5–2	Scotland	Cape Town, South Africa
12:15	Anuar 4'; Azrai 34', 49', 59'; Rozemi 42'	Report	Golden 40'; McConnell 57'	Stadium: Hartleyvale Stadium

12 June 2026 Pool A	New Zealand	1–0	Scotland	Cape Town, South Africa
19:00	Thomas 54'	Report		Stadium: Hartleyvale Stadium

14 June 2026 Pool A	Japan	1–0	Scotland	Cape Town, South Africa
14:45	Yamasaki 43'	Report		Stadium: Hartleyvale Stadium

16 June 2026 Pool A	Scotland	4–2	South Korea	Cape Town, South Africa
14:30	J. Golden 5', 41'; Gilmour 34'; C. Golden 55'	Report	Lee G. 20'; Park 59'	Stadium: Hartleyvale Stadium

19 June 2026 5/8 Classification	Ireland	4–4 (7–8 p)	Scotland	Cape Town, South Africa
14:30	Nelson 40', 55'; Hyland 57'; Duncan 59'	Report	Tweedie 28'; J. Golden 35', 43', 60'	Stadium: Hartleyvale Stadium
	Penalties
	Walsh (penalty shoot-out missed); G. Williams (penalty shoot-out scored); Nelson (penalty shoot-out scored); B. Walker (penalty shoot-out missed); Marshall (penalty shoot-out missed); G. Williams (penalty shoot-out scored); Nelson (penalty shoot-out scored); Walsh (penalty shoot-out missed); B. Walker (penalty shoot-out scored); Marshall (penalty shoot-out scored); G. Williams (penalty shoot-out scored); Nelson (penalty shoot-out missed)		(penalty shoot-out missed) S. Walker; (penalty shoot-out missed) Austin; (penalty shoot-out scored) J. Golden; (penalty shoot-out missed) C. Golden; (penalty shoot-out scored) Field; (penalty shoot-out scored) Austin; (penalty shoot-out scored) S. Walker; (penalty shoot-out missed) C. Golden; (penalty shoot-out scored) J. Golden; (penalty shoot-out scored) Field; (penalty shoot-out scored) Austin; (penalty shoot-out scored) S. Walker

20 June 2026 5/6 Classification	Malaysia	4–2	Scotland	Cape Town, South Africa
14:30	Saari 8'; Azrai 19', 50'; Anuar 45'	Report	Golden 32'; Nairn 44'	Stadium: Hartleyvale Stadium

==== 2027 EuroHockey Championship Qualifiers ====
09 July 2026 QF	Scotland	6–1	Turkey	Rome, Italy
12:15	McConnell 15'; J. Golden 25'; C. Golden 29'; Robb 44', 58'; Green 54'	Report	Aydin 38'

10 July 2026 SF	Scotland	6–4	Croatia	Rome, Italy
16:15	J. Golden 3', 41', 46'; Walker 5'; C. Golden 17'; Orr 52'	Report	Bachmann 32', 56'; Bahlen 37'; Mucić 49'

12 July 2026 Final	Scotland	3–1	Italy	Rome, Italy
16:00	J. Golden 8'; Walker 33'; C. Golden 34'	Report	Brocco 10'

==== Chile Test series ====
2 August 2026 Test 1	Scotland	1–0	Chile	Edinburgh, Scotland
12:30	Orr 52'	Report		Stadium: Peffermill Playing Fields, The University of Edinburgh

4 August 2026 Test 2	Scotland	2–0	Chile	Edinburgh, Scotland
19:30	Golden 44'; Robb 46'	Report		Stadium: Peffermill Playing Fields, The University of Edinburgh

== See also ==
- Great Britain men's national field hockey team
- Scotland women's national field hockey team
