= 2023 Men's EuroHockey Championship II =

Field hockey tournament

Tournament details
- Host country: Ireland
- City: Dublin
- Dates: 23–29 July
- Teams: 8 (from 1 confederation)
- Venue: National Sports Campus

Final positions
- Champions: Ireland (3rd title)
- Runner-up: Ukraine
- Third place: Scotland

Tournament statistics
- Matches played: 20
- Goals scored: 126 (6.3 per match)
- Top scorer: (Ireland) Lee Cole (9 goals)
- Best player: (Ireland) Sean Murray
- Best goalkeeper: (Ireland) David Harte

The 2023 Men's EuroHockey Championship II was the tenth edition of the Men's EuroHockey Championship II, the second level of the men's European field hockey championships organized by the European Hockey Federation. It was held from 23 to 29 July 2023 at the National Sports Campus in Dublin, Ireland.

The top two teams aside from Scotland qualified for the 2024 Men's FIH Hockey Olympic Qualifiers. The hosts Ireland won a record third Men's EuroHockey Championship II title by defeating Ukraine 5–2 in the final. Scotland were placed third.

== Qualification ==
The eight teams qualified based on their performance in the 2023 Men's EuroHockey Championship Qualifiers, with the runners-up and third-placed teams qualifying for the Championship II.

Dates	Event	Location	Quotas	Qualifiers
17–20 August 2022	EuroHockey Championship Qualifiers	Ourense, Spain	2	Czech Republic; Portugal
23–26 August 2022	EuroHockey Championship Qualifiers	Vienna, Austria	2	Italy; Ukraine
24–27 August 2022	EuroHockey Championship Qualifiers	Calais, France	2	Ireland; Turkey
24–27 August 2022	EuroHockey Championship Qualifiers	Glasgow, Scotland	2	Scotland; Switzerland
Total			8	

== Preliminary round ==
All times are local (UTC+2).

=== Pool A ===
Pos	Team	Pld	W	D	L	GF	GA	GD	Pts	Qualification
1	Ireland (H)	3	3	0	0	22	2	+20	9	Semi-finals
2	Ukraine	3	2	0	1	11	11	0	6	Semi-finals
3	Czech Republic	3	1	0	2	5	17	−12	3	
4	Portugal	3	0	0	3	8	16	−8	0	

Source: FIH
Rules for classification: 1) points; 2) matches won; 3) goal difference; 4) goals for; 5) head-to-head result; 6) field goals for.
(H) Hosts

23 July 2023
15:45

Ukraine	6–3	Portugal
Koshelenko 6', 14', 34', 48'; Kovalenko 16'; Onofriiuk 25'	Report	Ribeiro 20'; Santos 23'; Franco 41'

Umpires:
Mahmut Çilkiz (TUR)
Xavier Fenaert (FRA)

23 July 2023
18:00

Ireland	9–0	Czech Republic
Murray 18', 26'; Walker 24'; McKee 41', 58'; Cole 43', 56'; Duncan 44'; Johnson 56'	Report

Umpires:
Benjamin Messerli (SUI)
Kamaal Khan (ITA)

25 July 2023
17:30

Czech Republic	4–3	Portugal
Hes 17'; Klaban 37'; Plochý 41', 58'	Report	Castro 5'; Ribeiro 39'; Ventosa 49'

Umpires:
Benjamin Messerli (SUI)
Vladyslav Mikhailiuk (UKR)

25 July 2023
19:45

Ukraine	0–7	Ireland
	Report	O'Donoghue 23', 34'; Cole 30', 44', 56'; Empey 58'; Walker 59'

Umpires:
Hugo Jesus (POR)
Jamie Telfer (SCO)

26 July 2023
17:30

Czech Republic	1–5	Ukraine
Tomeš 56'	Report	Popov 7'; Koshelenko 19'; Paziuk 27'; Onofriiuk 39'; Kovalenko 40'

Umpires:
Mahmut Çilkiz (TUR)
Kamaal Khan (ITA)

26 July 2023
19:45

Ireland	6–2	Portugal
Walker 11'; Cole 19'; Duncan 43'; O'Donoghue 53'; Empey 53', 60'	Report	Franco 20'; Rebelo 33'

Umpires:
Xavier Fenaert (FRA)
Tomas Holek (CZE)

=== Pool B ===
Pos	Team	Pld	W	D	L	GF	GA	GD	Pts	Qualification
1	Italy	3	3	0	0	9	3	+6	9	Semi-finals
2	Scotland	3	2	0	1	15	3	+12	6	Semi-finals
3	Switzerland	3	1	0	2	6	7	−1	3	
4	Turkey	3	0	0	3	2	19	−17	0	

Source: FIH
Rules for classification: 1) points; 2) matches won; 3) goal difference; 4) goals for; 5) head-to-head result; 6) field goals for.

23 July 2023
11:15

Italy	4–0	Turkey
Sior 1'; Munafo' 29'; Dionisi Vici 44'; Mondo 56'	Report

Umpires:
Nick Bennett (ENG)
Jamie Telfer (SCO)

23 July 2023
13:30

Scotland	3–0	Switzerland
Robb 22'; Golden 30'; Walker 36'	Report

Umpires:
Russell Donaldson (IRL)
Vladyslag Mikhailiuk (UKR)

24 July 2023
15:15

Switzerland	5–2	Turkey
Conrad 29'; Grandchamp 38', 43'; Reinhard 48'; Hug 60'	Report	Ekinci 21'; Karakus 33'

Umpires:
Tomas Holek (CZE)
Kamaal Khan (ITA)

24 July 2023
17:30

Italy	3–2	Scotland
Giuliani 1'; Arosio 37'; Keenan 53'	Report	Golden 19'; White 31'

Umpires:
Hugo Jesus (POR)
Mahmut Çilkiz (TUR)

26 July 2023
13:00

Scotland	10–0	Turkey
Walker 2', 23', 56'; Forsyth 6', 21', 24', 39'; Golden 41', 54', 54'	Report

Umpires:
Nick Bennett (ENG)
Vladuslav Mikhailiuk (UKR)

26 July 2023
15:15

Switzerland	1–2	Italy
Grandchamp 56'	Report	Moretto 12'; Dionisi Vici 47'

Umpires:
Russell Donaldson (IRL)
Hugo Jesus (POR)

== Fifth to eighth place classification ==
The points obtained in the preliminary round against the other team will be carried over.

Pos	Team	Pld	W	D	L	GF	GA	GD	Pts
5	Czech Republic	3	2	1	0	13	6	+7	7
6	Switzerland	3	1	1	1	11	10	+1	4
7	Portugal	3	1	0	2	10	10	0	3
8	Turkey	3	1	0	2	5	13	−8	3

Source: FIH
Rules for classification: 1) points; 2) matches won; 3) goal difference; 4) goals for; 5) head-to-head result; 6) field goals for.

28 July 2023
10:15

Portugal	1–2	Turkey
Fourie 23'	Report	Elagöz 33'; Ekinci 39'

Umpires:
Jamie Telfer (SCO)
Russell Donaldson (IRL)

28 July 2023
12:30

Czech Republic	2–2	Switzerland
Plochý 5', 51'	Report	Stomps 28'; Hug 48'

Umpires:
Hugo Jesus (POR)
Kamaal Khan (ITA)

29 July 2023
09:00

Czech Republic	7–1	Turkey
Tomeš 8'; Plochý 13', 17', 33', 59'; Uhlíř 30', 36'	Report	Ekinci 35'

Umpires:
Vladyslav Mikhailiuk (UKR)
Russel Donaldson (IRL)

29 July 2023
11:15

Switzerland	4–6	Portugal
Hug 24'; Stomps 44', 55'; Hengartner 60'	Report	Franco 12', 51'; Castro 16', 39'; Caramalho 47'; Fourie 56'

Umpires:
Tomas Holek (CZE)
Jamie Telfer (SCO)

== First to fourth place classification ==
=== Bracket ===
Semi-finals
28 July
Ireland	4
Scotland	1
28 July
Italy	3 (3)
Ukraine (s.o.)	3 (4)

Final
29 July
Ireland	5
Ukraine	2
Third place
29 July
Scotland	4
Italy	1

=== Semi-finals ===
28 July 2023
14:45

Ireland	4–1	Scotland
Duncan 31'; Johnson 40'; Cole 50', 53'	Report	Forsyth 58'

Umpires:
Nick Bennett (ENG)
Mahmut Çilkiz (TUR)

28 July 2023
17:00

Italy	3–3	Ukraine
Mondo 7'; Arosio 39', 46'	Report	Paziuk 10'; Koshelenko 18'; Onofriiuk 47'
Penalties
Clement (penalty shoot-out missed); Keenan (penalty shoot-out scored); Arosio (penalty shoot-out missed); Brocco (penalty shoot-out scored); Amorosini (penalty shoot-out scored)	3–4	(penalty shoot-out scored) Onofriiuk; (penalty shoot-out scored) Shevchuk; (penalty shoot-out scored) Kovalenko; (penalty shoot-out missed) Kaplinskyi; (penalty shoot-out scored) Koshelenko

Umpires:
Xavier Fenaert (FRA)
Benjamin Messerli (SUI)

=== Third and fourth place ===
29 July 2023
13:45

Scotland	4–1	Italy
Moran 34'; Golden 40', 57'; Lochrin 53'	Report	Arosio 28'

Umpires:
Benjamin Messerli (SUI)
Mahmut Çilkiz (TUR)

=== Final ===
29 July 2023
16:00

Ireland	5–2	Ukraine
O'Donoghue 7'; Murray 50', 51'; Walker 53'; Cole 56'	Report	Paziuk 9'; Boiko 12'

Umpires:
Nick Bennett (ENG)
Xavier Fenaert (FRA)

== Final standings ==
Pos	Team	Qualification
1	Ireland (H)	2024 FIH Hockey Olympic Qualifiers
2	Ukraine	2024 FIH Hockey Olympic Qualifiers
3	Scotland (Note: Scotland is not eligible for the Olympics.)	
4	Italy	
5	Czech Republic	
6	Switzerland	
7	Portugal	
8	Turkey	

Source: FIH
(H) Host

== See also ==
- 2023 Men's EuroHockey Championship
- 2023 Men's EuroHockey Championship III
- 2023 Women's EuroHockey Championship II
