= 2024–25 Men's FIH Hockey Nations Cup 2 =

Field hockey tournament in Muscat, Oman

Tournament details
- Host country: Oman
- City: Muscat
- Dates: 17–23 February
- Teams: 8 (from 4 confederations)

Final positions
- Champions: Scotland (1st title)
- Runner-up: Egypt
- Third place: Poland

Tournament statistics
- Matches played: 20
- Goals scored: 98 (4.9 per match)
- Top scorer(s): (Scotland) Jamie Golden (Scotland) Struan Walker (8 goals)

The 2024–25 Men's FIH Hockey Nations Cup 2 was the first edition of the Men's FIH Hockey Nations Cup 2, the annual qualification tournament for the FIH Hockey Nations Cup organised by the International Hockey Federation. The tournament was held in Muscat, Oman from 17 to 23 February 2025.

== Teams ==
The eight highest ranked teams not participating in the 2024–25 Men's FIH Pro League and 2024–25 Men's FIH Hockey Nations Cup participated in the tournament.

- Austria
- Chile
- China
- Egypt
- Oman
- Poland
- Scotland
- United States

== Preliminary round ==
All times are local (UTC+4).

=== Pool A ===
Pos	Team	Pld	W	D	L	GF	GA	GD	Pts	Qualification
1	Egypt	3	2	1	0	10	7	+3	7	Semi-finals
2	Poland	3	1	2	0	7	3	+4	5	Semi-finals
3	China	3	1	1	1	7	7	0	4	
4	Chile	3	0	0	3	2	9	−7	0	

Source: FIH
Rules for classification: 1) points; 2) matches won; 3) goal difference; 4) goals for; 5) head-to-head result; 6) field goals scored.

17 February 2025
12:45

Egypt	5–4	China
El-Ganaini 4', 30'; Nasr 29'; Adel 39'; H. Ragab 42'	Report	Chen B. 21', 25'; Lu 38'; Gao 56'

Umpires:
Tyler Klenk (CAN)
Hussain Al-Hasani (OMA)

17 February 2025
14:45

Chile	0–4	Poland
	Report	Bembenek 17'; Koperski 43', 56'; Gumny 54'

Umpires:
Sourabh Rajput (IND)
Sheena Hori (JPN)

18 February 2025
12:45

China	1–1	Poland
Chao 2'	Report	Jarzyński 60'

Umpires:
Titus Mulwa (KEN)
Ilanggo Kanabathu (MAS)

18 February 2025
14:45

Chile	1–3	Egypt
Amoroso 6'	Report	El-Ganaini 15'; Mos. Ragab 55'; Moh. Ragab 59'

Umpires:
Jayden Pearson (AUS)
Clare Barwood (WAL)

20 February 2025
12:45

Egypt	2–2	Poland
Adel 11'; El-Ganaini 60'	Report	Koperski 25'; Jarzyński 48'

Umpires:
Hussain Al-Hasani (OMA)
Benjamin Messerli (SUI)

20 February 2025
14:45

China	2–1	Chile
Deng 31'; Lu 49'	Report	L. Valenzuela 9'

Umpires:
Sourabh Rajput (IND)
Jayden Pearson (AUS)

=== Pool B ===
Pos	Team	Pld	W	D	L	GF	GA	GD	Pts	Qualification
1	Scotland	3	2	0	1	15	6	+9	6	Semi-finals
2	United States	3	2	0	1	7	3	+4	6	Semi-finals
3	Austria	3	2	0	1	8	6	+2	6	
4	Oman (H)	3	0	0	3	4	19	−15	0	

Source: FIH
Rules for classification: 1) points; 2) matches won; 3) goal difference; 4) goals for; 5) head-to-head result; 6) field goals scored.
(H) Hosts

17 February 2025
16:45

Austria	0–1	United States
	Report	Charasika 6'

Umpires:
Ilanggo Kanabathu (MAS)
Mohammad Shahbaz (BAN)

17 February 2025
19:00

Scotland	10–1	Oman
Golden 4', 11'; McConnell 6', 21', 43'; Walker 7', 10'; Nairn 22'; Douglas 42'; Falconer 56'	Report	A. Al-Shaaibi 50'

Umpires:
Clare Barwood (WAL)
Titus Mulwa (KEN)

18 February 2025
16:45

Scotland	2–3	Austria
Golden 26', 58'	Report	Winkler 35'; Steyrer 45'; Losonci 57'

Umpires:
Tyler Klenk (CAN)
Sourabh Rajput (IND)

18 February 2025
19:00

United States	4–0	Oman
Leser 11'; Charasika 43', 47'; Motta 60'	Report

Umpires:
Sheena Hori (JPN)
Benjamin Messerli (SUI)

20 February 2025
16:45

United States	2–3	Scotland
Charasika 16', 28'	Report	Walker 2', 47'; Golden 4'

Umpires:
Sheena Hori (JPN)
Ilanggo Kanabathu (MAS)

20 February 2025
19:00

Austria	5–3	Oman
Wellan 39', 57'; Losonci 43'; Winkler 44'; Kaltenböck 55'	Report	Barazahan 11'; Al-Fazari 35'; Al-Wahaibi 56'

Umpires:
Mohammad Shahbaz (BAN)
Titus Mulwa (KEN)

== Classification round ==
=== Bracket ===
Crossovers
22 February
China	4
Oman	1
22 February
Austria	3
Chile	2

Fifth place
23 February
China	1
Austria	3
Seventh place
23 February
Oman	1
Chile	2

=== Crossovers ===
22 February 2025
11:00

China	4–1	Oman
Chen B. 1'; Gao 4', 25'; Du 20'	Report	Bait 20'

Umpires:
Tyler Klenk (CAN)
Mohammad Shahbaz (BAN)

22 February 2025
13:15

Austria	3–2	Chile
Losonci 9'; Wellan 23'; Fink 46'	Report	Amoroso 15'; A. Valenzuela 54'

Umpires:
Benjamin Messerli (SUI)
Hussain Al-Hasani (OMA)

=== Seventh and eighth place ===
23 February 2025
11:00

Oman	1–2	Chile
K. Al-Shaaibi 42'	Report	Gesswein 4'; García 43'

Umpires:
Mohammad Shahbaz (BAN)
Titus Mulwa (KEN)

=== Fifth and sixth place ===
23 February 2025
13:15

China	1–3	Austria
Gao 14'	Report	Frey 30+', 41'; Wellan 58'

Umpires:
Sheena Hori (JPN)
Hussain Al-Hasani (OMA)

== Medal round ==
=== Bracket ===
Semi-finals
22 February
Egypt	4
United States	2
22 February
Scotland	4
Poland	1

Final
23 February
Egypt	2
Scotland	4
Third place
23 February
United States	2 (1)
Poland (pen.)	2 (3)

=== Semi-finals ===
22 February 2025
15:30

Egypt	4–2	United States
Nasr 7'; Mos. Ragab 17'; Mamdouh 49'; El-Ganaini 59'	Report	K. Käppeler 6'; Charasika 15'

Umpires:
Sourabh Rajput (IND)
Clare Barwood (WAL)

22 February 2025
17:45

Scotland	4–1	Poland
Golden 46', 51'; Walker 47', 59'	Report	Koperski 55'

Umpires:
Ilanggo Kanabathu (MAS)
Jayden Pearson (AUS)

=== Third and fourth place ===
23 February 2025
15:30

United States	2–2	Poland
A. Käppeler 39'; Grewal 41'	Report	Koperski 13'; Jarzyński 36'
Penalties
Heldens (penalty shoot-out scored); A. Käppeler (penalty shoot-out missed); Harris (penalty shoot-out missed); Charasika (penalty shoot-out missed)	1–3	(penalty shoot-out scored) Hołosyniuk; (penalty shoot-out scored) Koperski; (penalty shoot-out scored) Janicki

Umpires:
Clare Barwood (WAL)
Jayden Pearson (AUS)

=== Final ===
23 February 2025
17:45

Egypt	2–4	Scotland
Moh. Ragab 52'; El-Ganaini 56'	Report	Walker 15', 30'; Golden 27'; Austin 35'

Umpires:
Tyler Klenk (CAN)
Benjamin Messerli (SUI)

== Statistics ==
=== Final standings ===
Pos	Team	Promotion
1st place, gold medalist(s)	Scotland	2025–26 Men's FIH Hockey Nations Cup
2nd place, silver medalist(s)	Egypt	
3rd place, bronze medalist(s)	Poland	
4	United States	
5	Austria	
6	China	
7	Chile	
8	Oman (H)	

Source: FIH
(H) Host

=== Goalscorers ===
There were 98 goals scored in 20 matches, for an average of 4.9 goals per match.

8 goals

- (Scotland) Jamie Golden
- (Scotland) Struan Walker

6 goals

- (Egypt) Ahmed El-Ganaini
- (United States) Sekayi Charasika

5 goals

- (Poland) Maksymilian Koperski

4 goals

- (Austria) Nikolas Wellan
- (China) Gao Jiesheng

3 goals

- (Austria) Fülöp Losonci
- (China) Chen Benhai
- (Poland) Gracjan Jarzyński
- (Scotland) Andrew McConnell

2 goals

- (Austria) Moritz Frey
- (Austria) Josef Winkler
- (Chile) Juan Amoroso
- (China) Lu Yuanlin
- (Egypt) Ziad Adel
- (Egypt) Mohamed Nasr
- (Egypt) Mohamed Ragab
- (Egypt) Mostafa Ragab

1 goal

- (Austria) Adrian Fink
- (Austria) Peter Kaltenböck
- (Austria) Florian Steyrer
- (Chile) Álvaro García
- (Chile) Kay Gesswein
- (Chile) Agustin Valenzuela
- (Chile) Luis Valenzuela
- (China) Chao Jieming
- (China) Deng Jingwen
- (China) Du Shihao
- (Egypt) Mahmoud Mamdouh
- (Egypt) Hossameldin Ragab
- (Oman) Ammaar Al-Shaaibi
- (Oman) Khalid Al-Shaaibi
- (Oman) Maitham Al-Wahaibi
- (Oman) Sanad Al-Fazari
- (Oman) Talal Bait
- (Oman) Asama Barazahan
- (Poland) Tomasz Bembenek
- (Poland) Mikołaj Gumny
- (Scotland) Thomas Austin
- (Scotland) Ali Douglas
- (Scotland) Craig Falconer
- (Scotland) David Nairn
- (United States) Mehtab Grewal
- (United States) Aki Käppeler
- (United States) Kei Käppeler
- (United States) Marius Leser
- (United States) Henzor Motta

Source: FIH

== See also ==
- 2024–25 Women's FIH Hockey Nations Cup 2
- 2024–25 Men's FIH Hockey Nations Cup
