= Men's FIH Hockey Nations Cup 2 =

International men's field hockey tournament

- Most recent season or competition: 2024–25 Men's FIH Hockey Nations Cup 2
- Sport: Field hockey
- Founded: 2024; 2 years ago
- First season: 2024–25
- No. of teams: 10
- Most recent champion: Scotland (1st title) (2024–25)
- Most titles: Scotland (1 title)
- Promotion to: FIH Hockey Nations Cup

The Men's FIH Hockey Nations Cup 2 is an international men's field hockey tournament organised annually by the International Hockey Federation. The tournament serves as the qualification tournament for the Men's FIH Hockey Nations Cup.

The tournament was founded in 2024 and the first edition will be held in February 2025 in Muscat, Oman. In June 2026, the tournament was expanded to ten teams competing, starting with the 2026–27 season.

== Results ==
Year	Host	Final			Third place match			Number of teams
Year	Host	Winner	Score	Runner-up	Third place	Score	Fourth place	Number of teams
2024–25	Muscat, Oman	Scotland	4–2	Egypt	Poland	2–2 (3–1 pen.)	United States	8

== Summary ==
Team	Winners	Runners-up	Third place	Fourth place
Scotland	1 (2024–25)			
Egypt		1 (2024–25)		
Poland			1 (2024–25)	
United States				1 (2024–25)

== Team appearances ==
Team	(Oman) 2024–25	2026–27	Total
Austria	5th	Q	2
Bangladesh	–	Q	1
Canada	–	Q	1
Chile	7th	Q	2
China	6th	Q	2
Egypt	2nd	–	1
Italy	–	Q	1
Oman	8th	Q	2
Poland	3rd	Q	2
Scotland	1st ▲	–	1
Ukraine	–	Q	1
United States	4th	–	1
Wales	–	Q	1
Total	8	10	

== See also ==
- Men's FIH Hockey Nations Cup
- Women's FIH Hockey Nations Cup 2
