= Men's EuroHockey Championship II =

European field hockey competition

- Current season, competition or edition: 2027 Men's EuroHockey Championship II
- Formerly: Men's EuroHockey Nations Trophy
- Sport: Field hockey
- Founded: 2005; 21 years ago
- First season: 2005
- No. of teams: 8
- Confederation: EHF (Europe)
- Most recent champion: Wales (1st title) (2025)
- Most titles: Ireland (3 titles)
- Level on pyramid: 2

The Men's EuroHockey Championship II, formerly known as the Men's EuroHockey Nations Trophy, is a competition for European national field hockey teams. It is the second level of European field hockey Championships for national teams.

Underneath the Championship II there exists at least one division of the EuroHockey Nations Challenge, like European Championship III. There is promotion and relegation. The two first ranked teams qualify for the next EuroHockey Nations Championship and are replaced by the two lowest-ranked teams from that tournament. The teams finishing in seventh and eighth positions are relegated to the EuroHockey Championship III and replaced by the two highest-ranked from that tournament.

The tournament has been won by eight different teams: Ireland has the most titles with three, Poland follows with two and Austria, the Czech Republic, France, Russia, Scotland and Wales have all won the tournament once. Wales won the most recent edition, held in Lousada, Portugal.

== Results ==
Year	Host	Final			Third place match			Number of teams
Year	Host	Winner	Score	Runner-up	Third place	Score	Fourth place	Number of teams
2005; Details	Rome, Italy	Ireland	4–2	Czech Republic	Wales	2–1	Austria	8
2007; Details	Lisbon, Portugal	Poland	4–3	Austria	Scotland	4–3 (a.e.t)	Switzerland	8
2009; Details	Wrexham, Wales	Ireland	2–1	Russia	Wales	5–2	Czech Republic	8
2011; Details	Vinnytsia, Ukraine	Czech Republic	1–1 (2–1 s.o.)	Poland	Scotland	4–3	Austria	8
2013; Details	Vienna, Austria	Russia	0–0 (5–4 s.o.)	France	Austria	6–1	Azerbaijan	8
2015; Details	Prague, Czech Republic	Poland	3–1	Austria	Scotland	5–1	Czech Republic	8
2017; Details	Glasgow, Scotland	Scotland	2–1	Wales	France	5–4	Russia	8
2019; Details	Cambrai, France	France	4–0	Russia	Austria	4–1	Poland	8
2021; Details	Gniezno, Poland	Austria	1–1 (7–6 s.o.)	Scotland	Ireland	4–2	Poland	8
2023; Details	Dublin, Ireland	Ireland	5–2	Ukraine	Scotland	4–1	Italy	8
2025; Details	Lousada, Portugal	Wales	1–1 (3–1 s.o.)	Ireland	Scotland	5–2	Italy	8
2027; Details	Plzeň, Czech Republic							8

=== Summary ===
Team	Winners	Runners-up	Third place	Fourth place
Ireland	3 (2005, 2009, 2023*)	1 (2025)	1 (2021)	
Poland	2 (2007, 2015)	1 (2011)		2 (2019, 2021*)
Austria	1 (2021)	2 (2007, 2015)	2 (2013*, 2019)	2 (2005, 2011)
Russia	1 (2013)	2 (2009, 2019)		1 (2017)
Scotland	1 (2017*)	1 (2021)	5 (2007, 2011, 2015, 2023, 2025)	
Wales	1 (2025)	1 (2017)	2 (2005, 2009*)	
France	1 (2019*)	1 (2013)	1 (2017)	
Czech Republic	1 (2011)	1 (2005)		2 (2009, 2015*)
Ukraine		1 (2023)		
Italy				2 (2023, 2025)
Azerbaijan				1 (2013)
Switzerland				1 (2007)

* = host nation

=== Team appearances ===
Team	(Italy) 2005	(Portugal) 2007	(Wales) 2009	(Ukraine) 2011	(Austria) 2013	(Czech Republic) 2015	(Scotland) 2017	(France) 2019	(Poland) 2021	(Republic of Ireland) 2023	(Portugal) 2025	(Czech Republic) 2027	Total
Austria	4th	2nd	–	4th	3rd	2nd	–	3rd	1st	–	–	–	7
Azerbaijan	–	–	–	–	4th	5th	–	–	–	–	–	–	2
Belarus	7th	–	6th	8th	–	–	–	8th	–	–	–	–	4
Croatia	–	–	–	–	–	8th	–	–	8th	–	7th	Q	4
Czech Republic	2nd	–	4th	1st	–	4th	6th	7th	–	5th	5th	Q	9
France	–	–	–	–	2nd	–	3rd	1st	–	–	–	–	3
Gibraltar	–	–	–	–	–	–	–	–	–	–	–	Q	1
Ireland	1st	–	1st	–	–	–	–	–	3rd	1st	2nd	–	5
Italy	5th	6th	7th	–	8th	–	–	5th	5th	4th	4th	–	8
Lithuania	–	–	–	–	–	–	–	–	–	–	–	Q	1
Poland	–	1st	–	2nd	–	1st	–	4th	4th	–	–	–	5
Portugal	–	7th	–	–	–	–	8th	–	–	7th	8th	Q	5
Russia	8th	–	2nd	–	1st	–	4th	2nd	–	–	–	–	5
Scotland	–	3rd	5th	3rd	6th	3rd	1st	–	2nd	3rd	3rd	–	9
Sweden	–	–	–	7th	–	–	–	–	–	–	–	–	1
Switzerland	6th	4th	8th	–	–	7th	7th	–	7th	6th	6th	Q	9
Turkey	–	–	–	–	–	–	–	–	–	8th	–	Q	2
Ukraine	–	8th	–	5th	5th	6th	5th	6th	6th	2nd	WD	Q	9
Wales	3rd	5th	3rd	6th	7th	–	2nd	–	–	–	1st	–	7
Total	8	8	8	8	8	8	8	8	8	8	8	8	

== See also ==
- Men's EuroHockey Championship
- Men's EuroHockey Championship III
- Women's EuroHockey Championship II
