= 2025 Men's EuroHockey Championship Qualifiers =

Field hockey tournaments

Tournament details
- Host countries: Austria; Ireland
- Dates: 22–25 August 2024
- Teams: 16 (from 1 confederation)
- Venue: 2 (in 2 host cities)

Tournament statistics
- Matches played: 24
- Goals scored: 192 (8 per match)
- Top scorer: (Austria) Fülöp Losonci (10 goals)

The 2025 Men's EuroHockey Championship Qualifiers was a series of two qualification events for the 2025 EuroHockey Championships in Mönchengladbach. The tournaments were held in Austria, and Ireland between 22 and 25 August 2024.

The top team from each tournament qualified for the EuroHockey Championships. The second and third ranked teams from each group advanced to the EuroHockey Championship II, with the remaining teams advancing to the EuroHockey Championship III.

== Qualification ==
All eligible teams from the 2023 editions of the EuroHockey Championships II and III participated, as well as the two lowest ranked teams from the EuroHockey Championships.

Dates	Event	Location	Quotas	Qualifier(s)
19–27 August 2023	2023 EuroHockey Championship	Mönchengladbach, Germany	2	Austria; Wales
23–29 July 2023	2023 EuroHockey Championship II	Dublin, Ireland	8	Czech Republic; Ireland; Italy; Portugal; Scotland; Switzerland; Turkey; Ukraine
23–29 July 2023	2023 EuroHockey Championship III	Skierniewice, Poland	4	Croatia; ~~Gibraltar~~^{[a]} Lithuania; Malta; Poland
30 January 2024	FIH Men's World Ranking	—N/a	2	Hungary^{[a]} Luxembourg
Total			16	

^[a] – Gibraltar withdrew from the competition and was replaced by Hungary.

== Qualifier A ==
Tournament details
- Host country: Austria
- City: Vienna
- Dates: 22–25 August
- Teams: 8 (from 1 confederation)
- Venue: SV Arminen

Final positions
- Champions: Austria
- Runner-up: Ukraine
- Third place: Scotland

Tournament statistics
- Matches played: 12
- Goals scored: 98 (8.17 per match)
- Top scorer: (Austria) Fülöp Losonci (10 goals)
- Best player: (Ukraine) Bohdan Kovalenko

Qualifier A was held in Vienna, Austria from 22 to 25 August 2024.

=== Bracket ===
Quarter-finals
22 August
Austria	24
Hungary	0
22 August
Switzerland	1 (3)
Portugal (s.o.)	1 (4)
22 August
Ukraine	8
Lithuania	0
22 August
Scotland	10
Croatia	2

Semi-finals
24 August
Austria	3
Portugal	1
24 August
Ukraine	1
Scotland	0

Final
25 August
Austria	3
Ukraine	1
Third place
25 August
Portugal	2
Scotland	10

=== Quarter-finals ===
22 August 2024
11:00

Ukraine	8–0	Lithuania
Boiko 1'; Kovalenko 15', 32'; Onofriiuk 19', 33'; Solomianyi 21'; Koshelenko 45'; Zinevych 60'	Report

Umpires:
Jakub Mejzlik (CZE)
Steven Bakker (NED)

22 August 2024
13:15

Scotland	10–2	Croatia
Austin 13'; Lochrin 15'; Walker 27', 59'; Morton 38'; C. Golden 39', 46'; McConnell 50'; J. Golden 52', 60'	Report	Krleža 8'; Zidanić 44'

Umpires:
Lukasz Zwierzchowski (POL)
Shane O'Donnell (IRL)

22 August 2024
15:30

Switzerland	1–1	Portugal
Gasser 45+'	Report	Santos 52'
Penalties
Stomps (penalty shoot-out missed); Grandchamp (penalty shoot-out scored); Landtwing (penalty shoot-out scored); Reinhard (penalty shoot-out scored); Hengartner (penalty shoot-out missed)	3–4	(penalty shoot-out scored) Castro; (penalty shoot-out scored) Santos; (penalty shoot-out scored) Ventosa; (penalty shoot-out scored) Moreira

Umpires:
Sean Edwards (ENG)
Daniel Denta (DEN)

22 August 2024
17:45

Austria	24–0	Hungary
Lindengrun 2', 2', 53'; Losonci 14', 18', 27', 31', 46', 55', 57'; Kucera 15'; Hackl 28'; Steyrer 33', 43', 60'; Kern 36'; Unterkircher 37'; Hasun 39', 41'; Soldat 42', 48'; Kelner 44'; Winkler 50'; Scholz 52'	Report

Umpires:
Kevin Roberts (WAL)
Daniël Veerman (NED)

=== Fifth to eighth place classification ===
Cross-overs
23 August
Lithuania	1
Croatia	4
23 August
Hungary	0
Switzerland	13

Fifth place
25 August
Croatia	1
Switzerland	3
Seventh place
25 August
Lithuania	7
Hungary	2

==== Cross-overs ====
23 August 2024
15:30

Lithuania	1–4	Croatia
Sinkevičius 38'	Report	Šoić 13', 29'; Krleža 27'; Gavran 59'

Umpires:
Shane O'Donnell (IRL)
Steven Bakker (NED)

23 August 2024
17:45

Hungary	0–13	Switzerland
	Report	Grandchamp 6', 30', 35', 39', 46', 56'; Landtwing 21'; Hengartner 39', 42', 44'; Krüsi 42'; Schwehr 55'; Brönnimann 55'

Umpires:
Daniel Denta (DEN)
Kevin Roberts (WAL)

==== Seventh and eighth place ====
25 August 2024
09:15

Lithuania	7–2	Hungary
Ridlauskas 2'; Sinkevičius 30', 47', 49', 53', 56', 60'	Report	Leber 42'; Kovacs 45'

Umpires:
Jakub Mejzlik (CZE)
Daniel Denta (DEN)

==== Fifth and sixth place ====
25 August 2024
11:30

Croatia	1–3	Switzerland
Krleža 20'	Report	Stomps 10'; Grandchamp 18'; Brönnimann 25'

Umpires:
Lukasz Zwierzchowski (POL)
Steven Bakker (NED)

=== First to fourth place classification ===
==== Semi-finals ====
24 August 2024
12:00

Ukraine	1–0	Scotland
Solomianyi 44'	Report

Umpires:
Sean Edwards (ENG)
Daniël Veerman (NED)

24 August 2024
14:15

Austria	3–1	Portugal
Scholz 30+'; Losonci 44', 54'	Report	Castro 43'

Umpires:
Jakub Mejzlik (CZE)
Lukasz Zwierzchowski (POL)

==== Third and fourth place ====
25 August 2024
13:45

Portugal	2–10	Scotland
Pereira 10'; Castro 52'	Report	C. Golden 4', 49'; Walker 8', 12', 30', 59'; Douglas 32'; Robb 38', 47'; J. Golden 45+'

Umpires:
Shane O'Donnell (IRL)
Kevin Roberts (WAL)

==== Final ====
25 August 2024
16:00

Austria	3–1	Ukraine
Lindengrun 3'; Kaltenböck 5'; Losonci 17'	Report	Koshelenko 54'

Umpires:
Sean Edwards (ENG)
Daniël Veerman (NED)

=== Final standings ===
Pos	Team	Qualification
1	Austria (H)	2025 EuroHockey Championship
2	Ukraine	2025 EuroHockey Championship II
3	Scotland	2025 EuroHockey Championship II
4	Portugal	2025 EuroHockey Championship II
5	Switzerland	2025 EuroHockey Championship II
6	Croatia	2025 EuroHockey Championship III
7	Lithuania	2025 EuroHockey Championship III
8	Hungary	2025 EuroHockey Championship III

Source: FIH
(H) Host

== Qualifier B ==
Tournament details
- Host country: Ireland
- City: Dublin
- Dates: 22–25 August
- Teams: 8 (from 1 confederation)
- Venue: National Sports Campus Dublin

Final positions
- Champions: Poland
- Runner-up: Wales
- Third place: Ireland

Tournament statistics
- Matches played: 12
- Goals scored: 94 (7.83 per match)
- Top scorer: (Ireland) Alistair Empey (7 goals)
- Best player: (Ireland) Daragh Walsh

Qualifier B was held in Dublin, Ireland from 22 to 25 August 2024.

=== Bracket ===
Quarter-finals
22 August
Ireland	25
Malta	0
22 August
Italy	0 (3)
Poland (s.o.)	0 (4)
22 August
Wales	17
Luxembourg	0
22 August
Czech Republic	9
Turkey	1

Semi-finals
24 August
Ireland	0 (2)
Poland (s.o.)	0 (4)
24 August
Wales	7
Czech Republic	1

Final
25 August
Poland	2
Wales	1
Third place
25 August
Ireland	4
Czech Republic	0

=== Quarter-finals ===
22 August 2024
11:00

Wales	17–0	Luxembourg
Pritchard 6', 15', 33'; N. Morgan 11', 45'; Bradshaw 13'; J. Morgan 26', 27', 37'; Dolan-Gray 27', 59'; Newbold 32'; Jones 44'; Francis 48', 56'; Hutchinson 55'; Griffiths 57'	Report

Umpires:
Rob Argent (IRL)
Raphaël Adrien (GER)

22 August 2024
13:15

Czech Republic	9–1	Turkey
Železný 6', 8'; Toms 18'; Plochý 27', 58', 60'; Soukup 34'; Uhlíř 38'; Plachý 56'	Report	Durmuş 9'

Umpires:
Michael Pontus (BEL)
Jaroslav Suchocki (LTU)

22 August 2024
15:30

Italy	0–0	Poland
	Report
Penalties
Amorisini (penalty shoot-out scored); Fr. Harte (penalty shoot-out scored); Fa. Harte (penalty shoot-out scored); Brocco (penalty shoot-out missed); Clement (penalty shoot-out missed)	3–4	(penalty shoot-out scored) P. Pawlak; (penalty shoot-out missed) Hołosyniuk; (penalty shoot-out scored) Kurowski; (penalty shoot-out scored) R. Pawlak; (penalty shoot-out scored) Jarzyński

Umpires:
Benjamin Messerli (SUI)
David Sweetman (SCO)

22 August 2024
17:45

Ireland	25–0	Malta
Empey 2', 15', 24', 28', 39', 59'; Johnson 5', 33', 45', 59'; Robson 9', 14'; Madeley 10'; Lynch 22', 24'; Walker 25', 34', 47', 56'; Cole 26'; O'Donoghue 27', 43'; C. Rowe 29'; L. Rowe 38'; Walsh 41'	Report

Umpires:
Sébastien Michielsen (BEL)
Jamie Telfer (SCO)

=== Fifth to eighth place classification ===
Cross-overs
23 August
Luxembourg	1
Turkey	4
23 August
Malta	0
Italy	12

Fifth place
25 August
Turkey	1
Italy	5
Seventh place
25 August
Luxembourg	0
Malta	4

==== Cross-overs ====
23 August 2024
15:30

Luxembourg	1–4	Turkey
Desloovere 58'	Report	Ataş 14'; Karaku 35', 44'; Özakalin 50'

Umpires:
Jamie Telfer (SCO)
David Sweetman (SCO)

23 August 2024
17:45

Malta	0–12	Italy
	Report	Giuliani 7', 30'; Valentino 13', 26'; Clement 14', 31', 33', 60'; Arosio 28'; Vici 47'; Saoncella 49', 58'

Umpires:
Rob Argent (IRL)
Jaroslav Suchocki (LTU)

==== Seventh and eighth place ====
25 August 2024
09:15

Luxembourg	0–4	Malta
	Report	T. Degiovanni 23', 34', 35'; Zahra 45'

Umpires:
David Sweetman (SCO)
Jaroslav Suchocki (LTU)

==== Fifth and sixth place ====
25 August 2024
11:30

Turkey	1–5	Italy
Elagöz 42'	Report	Vici 33'; Valentino 37'; Mondo 45'; Fr. Harte 60'; Saoncella 60'

Umpires:
Raphaël Adrien (GER)
Rob Argent (IRL)

=== First to fourth place classification ===
==== Semi-finals ====
24 August 2024
12:00

Wales	7–1	Czech Republic
Newbold 3'; Dinnie 9'; Bradshaw 11'; Griffiths 17', 22'; Rawlings 28'; Jones 36'	Report	Plochý 48'

Umpires:
Sébastien Michielsen (BEL)
Benjamin Messerli (SUI)

24 August 2024
14:15

Ireland	0–0	Poland
	Report
Penalties
Walsh (penalty shoot-out scored); Cole (penalty shoot-out scored); Brown (penalty shoot-out missed); O'Donoghue (penalty shoot-out missed)	2–4	(penalty shoot-out scored) P. Pawlak; (penalty shoot-out scored) Hołosyniuk; (penalty shoot-out scored) Kurowski; (penalty shoot-out missed) R. Pawlak; (penalty shoot-out scored) Jarzyński

Umpires:
Raphaël Adrien (GER)
Michael Pontus (BEL)

==== Third and fourth place ====
25 August 2024
13:45

Ireland	4–0	Czech Republic
O'Donoghue 6'; Empey 32'; Cole 33'; Rowe 37'	Report

Umpires:
Michael Pontus (BEL)
Jamie Telfer (SCO)

==== Final ====
25 August 2024
16:00

Poland	2–1	Wales
Pawlak 37'; Bembenek 51'	Report	Francis 11'

Umpires:
Sébastien Michielsen (BEL)
Benjamin Messerli (SUI)

=== Final standings ===
Pos	Team	Qualification
1	Poland	2025 EuroHockey Championship
2	Wales	2025 EuroHockey Championship II
3	Ireland (H)	2025 EuroHockey Championship II
4	Czech Republic	2025 EuroHockey Championship II
5	Italy	2025 EuroHockey Championship II
6	Turkey	2025 EuroHockey Championship III
7	Malta	2025 EuroHockey Championship III
8	Luxembourg	2025 EuroHockey Championship III

Source: FIH
(H) Host

== See also ==
- 2025 Women's EuroHockey Championship Qualifiers
