= 2026 Men's FIH Hockey World Cup Qualifiers =

Field hockey tournament

Tournament details
- Host countries: Chile; Egypt
- Dates: 1–8 March 2026
- Teams: 16 (from 4 confederations)
- Venue: 2 (in 2 host cities)

The 2026 Men's FIH Hockey World Cup Qualifiers were the final stage of the qualification for the 2026 Men's FIH Hockey World Cup. It was held from 28 February to 8 March 2026.

Two events were held, one each in Santiago, Chile and Ismailia, Egypt.

== Format ==
Teams not qualifying from the continental qualification tournament were participating in this tournament according to the respective spots received by the FIH. The 16 teams were split into two eight team tournaments. In each tournament the eight teams were divided into two four-team pools. After the round-robin stage the top two teams advanced to the semifinals. The top three teams of each tournament and the highest world ranked team that finished in fourth place in each event qualified for the World Cup.

== Entrants ==
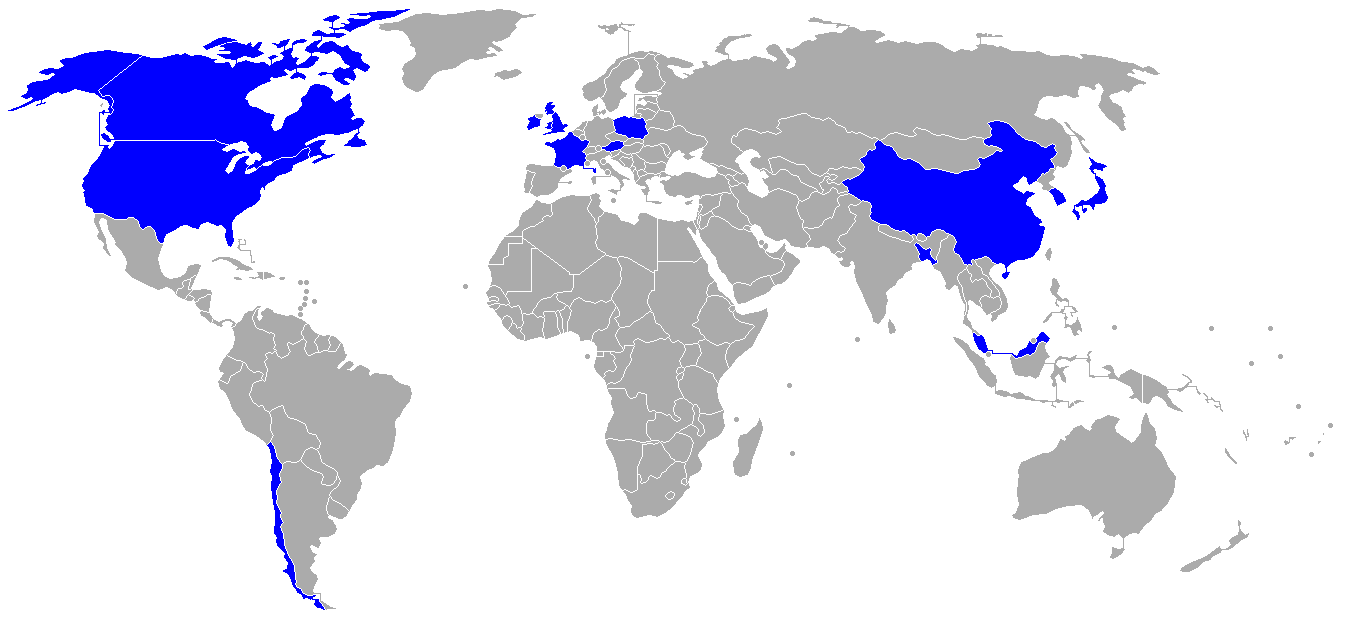
Highlighted are the countries that are participating in the 2026 Men's FIH Hockey World Cup Qualifiers.

| Qualification | Date | Host | Berths | Qualified team |
|---|---|---|---|---|
| 2025 Pan American Cup | 24 July–3 August 2025 | (Uruguay) Montevideo | 3 | Canada; Chile; United States |
| 2025 EuroHockey Championship II | 27 July–2 August 2025 | (Portugal) Lousada | 3 | Ireland; Scotland; Wales |
| 2025 EuroHockey Championship | 8–17 August 2025 | (Germany) Mönchengladbach | 4 | Austria; England; France; Poland |
| 2025 Asia Cup | 29 August−7 September 2025 | (India) Rajgir | 4 | China; Japan; Malaysia; South Korea |
| 2025 Hockey Africa Cup of Nations | 11–18 October 2025 | (Egypt) Ismailia | 1 | Egypt |
| 2025 Asia Play-offs | 13–16 November 2025 | (Bangladesh) Dhaka | 1 | Pakistan |
| Total | | | 16 | |

== Ismailia ==
Tournament details
- Host country: Egypt
- City: Ismailia
- Dates: 1–7 March
- Teams: 8 (from 4 confederations)
- Venue: Suez Canal Authority Hockey Stadium

Final positions
- Champions: England
- Runner-up: Pakistan
- Third place: Japan

Tournament statistics
- Matches played: 17
- Goals scored: 106 (6.24 per match)
- Top scorer: (Egypt) Ahmed El-Ganaini (5 goals)
- Best player: (England) Tom Sorsby
- Best young player: (Pakistan) Waleed Rana
- Best goalkeeper: (Egypt) Mohamed Gamal

The first qualifier was held at the Suez Canal Authority Hockey Stadium in Ismailia, Egypt from 1 to 7 March 2026. England won the qualifier by defeating Pakistan 4–1 in the final, both directly qualifying for the World Cup. Japan sealed the third direct qualification by defeating Malaysia 5–4. Malaysia qualified based on World Ranking.

=== Preliminary round ===
All times are local (UTC+2).

==== Pool A ====
| Pos | Team | Pld | W | D | L | GF | GA | GD | Pts | Qualification |
|---|---|---|---|---|---|---|---|---|---|---|
| 1 | England | 3 | 3 | 0 | 0 | 13 | 0 | +13 | 9 | Semi-finals |
| 2 | Japan | 3 | 2 | 0 | 1 | 10 | 8 | +2 | 6 | Semi-finals |
| 3 | Egypt (H) | 3 | 1 | 0 | 2 | 6 | 10 | −4 | 3 | Classification round |
| 4 | United States | 3 | 0 | 0 | 3 | 1 | 12 | −11 | 0 | Classification round |

Source: FIH
Rules for classification: 1) points; 2) matches won; 3) goal difference; 4) goals for; 5) head-to-head result; 6) field goals for.
(H) Hosts

1 March 2026
18:45

| England | 5–0 | Japan |
|---|---|---|
| Sorsby 11', 36'; Ward 13'; Croft 17', 44' | Report |

Umpires:
Irene Presenqui (ARG)
Timothy Sheahan (AUS)

1 March 2026
20:45

| Egypt | 3–1 | United States |
|---|---|---|
| El-Ganaini 10'; Atef 22'; Mohsen 52' | Report | A. Käppeler 6' |

Umpires:
Gareth Greenfield (NZL)
Raphaël Adrien (GER)

2 March 2026
18:45

| Japan | 4–0 | United States |
|---|---|---|
| Matsumoto 3'; Yamasaki 23'; Ooka 28'; Kimura 56' | Report |

Umpires:
Steve Rogers (AUS)
Raphaël Adrien (GER)

2 March 2026
20:45

| Egypt | 0–3 | England |
|---|---|---|
| | Report | Ward 27'; Bandurak 29'; Sorsby 57' |

Umpires:
Sean Rapaport (RSA)
Aziz Adimah (GHA)

4 March 2026
18:45

| England | 5–0 (Note: The United States withdrew after two matches because of an official advisory from the US State Department due to the 2026 Iran War. Matches played stood and all other matches were cancelled and resulted in favour of the opposing team.) | United States |
|---|---|---|
| | Report |

4 March 2026
20:45

| Japan | 6–3 | Egypt |
|---|---|---|
| Fujishima 7', 52', 59'; Shinohara 9'; Matsumoto 11', 40' | Report | El-Ganaini 22', 33', 34' |

Umpires:
Jonas van't Hek (NED)
Aziz Adimah (GHA)

==== Pool B ====
| Pos | Team | Pld | W | D | L | GF | GA | GD | Pts | Qualification |
|---|---|---|---|---|---|---|---|---|---|---|
| 1 | Pakistan | 3 | 3 | 0 | 0 | 14 | 9 | +5 | 9 | Semi-finals |
| 2 | Malaysia | 3 | 2 | 0 | 1 | 14 | 10 | +4 | 6 | Semi-finals |
| 3 | China | 3 | 0 | 1 | 2 | 9 | 11 | −2 | 1 | Classification round |
| 4 | Austria | 3 | 0 | 1 | 2 | 4 | 11 | −7 | 1 | Classification round |

Source: FIH
Rules for classification: 1) points; 2) matches won; 3) goal difference; 4) goals for; 5) head-to-head result; 6) field goals for.

1 March 2026
13:00

| Malaysia | 6–1 | Austria |
|---|---|---|
| Azrai 24', 44'; Silverius 24'; Sumantri 34'; Akhimullah 52'; Jalil 57' | Report | Losonci 3' |

Umpires:
Sean Rapaport (RSA)
Hideki Kinoshita (JPN)

1 March 2026
15:00

| Pakistan | 5–4 | China |
|---|---|---|
| Khan 8'; Wah. Rana 20'; Ammad 21'; Mahmood 35'; Wal. Rana 43' | Report | Du 16', 39'; Guan 42'; Zhang 49' |

Umpires:
Steve Rogers (AUS)
Aziz Adimah (GHA)

2 March 2026
13:00

| Pakistan | 5–3 | Malaysia |
|---|---|---|
| Wah. Rana 13'; Hayat 16'; Ahmad 45+'; Khan 49'; Ammad 56' | Report | Abdu Rauf 12'; Akhimullah 14'; Fitri 40' |

Umpires:
Jonas van't Hek (NED)
Hideki Kinoshita (JPN)

2 March 2026
15:00

| Austria | 1–1 | China |
|---|---|---|
| Frey 27' | Report | Chen B. 31' |

Umpires:
Annelize Rostron (RSA)
Timothy Sheahan (AUS)

4 March 2026
13:00

| Austria | 2–4 | Pakistan |
|---|---|---|
| Kelner 47'; Scholz 53' | Report | Afraz 4'; Mahmood 44', 52'; Khan 51' |

Umpires:
Gareth Greenfield (NZL)
Irene Presenqui (ARG)

4 March 2026
15:00

| Malaysia | 5–4 | China |
|---|---|---|
| Fitri 5', 43'; Rozemi 28'; Faiz 36'; Faizal 47' | Report | Wang Y. 8'; Zhao 16', 51'; Chen B. 11' |

Umpires:
Annelize Rostron (RSA)
Timothy Sheahan (AUS)

=== Classification round ===
Crossover
6 March
Egypt | 4
Austria | 0
6 March
China | w/o
United States

Fifth place
7 March
Egypt | 3
China | 4
Seventh place
7 March
Austria | w/o
United States

==== Crossovers ====
6 March 2026
09:00

| China | Walkover | United States |
|---|---|---|
| | Report |

6 March 2026
11:00

| Egypt | 4–0 | Austria |
|---|---|---|
| El-Ganaini 9'; Awad 25'; Mamdouh 47'; Adel 53' | Report |

Umpires:
Jonas van't Hek (NED)
Annelize Rostron (RSA)

==== Seventh and eighth place ====
7 March 2026
09:00

| Austria | Walkover | United States |
|---|---|---|
| | Report |

==== Fifth and sixth place ====
7 March 2026
11:00

| Egypt | 3–4 | China |
|---|---|---|
| Adel 31'; Ragab 36'; Kamal 41' | Report | Du 44'; Su 53'; Chen Q. 56'; Ao 59' |

Umpires:
Steve Rogers (AUS)
Annelize Rostron (RSA)

=== Medal round ===
Semi-finals
6 March
England | 7
Malaysia | 1
6 March
Pakistan | 4
Japan | 3

Final
7 March
England | 4
Pakistan | 1
Third place
7 March
Malaysia | 4
Japan | 5

==== Semi-finals ====
6 March 2026
13:15

| England | 7–1 | Malaysia |
|---|---|---|
| Ward 19'; Hooper 36', 60'; Sorsby 42'; Rushmere 43', 49'; Wallace 54' | Report | Hassan 50' |

Umpires:
Gareth Greenfield (NZL)
Hideki Kinoshita (JPN)

6 March 2026
15:30

| Pakistan | 4–3 | Japan |
|---|---|---|
| Ammad 9'; Mahmood 52'; Khan 55'; Afraz 57' | Report | Ooka 21'; Yamada 35'; Yamasaki 41' |

Umpires:
Steve Rogers (AUS)
Raphaël Adrien (GER)

==== Third and fourth place ====
7 March 2026
15:00

| Malaysia | 4–5 | Japan |
|---|---|---|
| Fitri 30'; Jalil 32'; Cholan 36'; Faizal 59' | Report | Ooka 15'; Matsumoto 38'; Fujishima 52'; Yamasaki 55', 57' |

Umpires:
Jonas van't Hek (NED)
Irene Presenqui (ARG)

==== Final ====
7 March 2026
20:00

| England | 4–1 | Pakistan |
|---|---|---|
| Croft 18'; Hooper 35', 40'; Fox 52' | Report | Wal. Rana 42' |

Umpires:
Sean Rapaport (RSA)
Aziz Adimah (GHA)

=== Goalscorers ===
There were 106 goals scored in 17 matches, for an average of 6.24 goals per match.

5 goals

- (Egypt) Ahmed El-Ganaini

4 goals

- (England) Sam Hooper
- (England) Tom Sorsby
- (Japan) Raiki Fujishima
- (Japan) Kazumasa Matsumoto
- (Japan) Koji Yamasaki
- (Malaysia) Fitri Saari
- (Pakistan) Sufyan Khan
- (Pakistan) Abu Mahmood

3 goals

- (China) Du Shihao
- (England) Henry Croft
- (England) Sam Ward
- (Japan) Ryoma Ooka
- (Pakistan) Muhammad Ammad

2 goals

- (China) Chen Benhai
- (China) Zhao Yulai
- (Egypt) Ziad Adel
- (England) Stuart Rushmere
- (Malaysia) Akhimullah Anuar
- (Malaysia) Abu Kamal Azrai
- (Malaysia) Marhan Jalil
- (Malaysia) Faizal Saari
- (Pakistan) Afraz
- (Pakistan) Waheed Rana
- (Pakistan) Waleed Rana

1 goal

- (Austria) Moritz Frey
- (Austria) Maximilian Kelner
- (Austria) Fülöp Losonci
- (Austria) Maximilian Scholz
- (China) Ao Xu
- (China) Chen Qijun
- (China) Guan Quyang
- (China) Su Rui
- (China) Wang Yaqi
- (China) Zhang Xiaojia
- (Egypt) Hamada Atef
- (Egypt) Hussein Awad
- (Egypt) Said Kamal
- (Egypt) Mahmoud Mamdouh
- (Egypt) Ahmed Mohsen
- (Egypt) Mostafa Ragab
- (England) Nick Bandurak
- (England) Ben Fox
- (England) Zachary Wallace
- (Japan) Kosei Kawabe
- (Japan) Ryosuke Shinohara
- (Japan) Shota Yamada
- (Malaysia) Syed Cholan
- (Malaysia) Shafiq Hassan
- (Malaysia) Aiman Rozemi
- (Malaysia) Faiz Jali
- (Malaysia) Muhajir Abdu Rauf
- (Malaysia) Shello Silverius
- (Malaysia) Norsyafiq Sumantri
- (Pakistan) Nadeem Ahmad
- (Pakistan) Zikriya Hayat
- (United States) Aki Käppeler

Source: FIH

=== Final standings ===
| Pos | Team | Qualification |
|---|---|---|
| 1 | England | 2026 Men's FIH Hockey World Cup |
| 2 | Pakistan | 2026 Men's FIH Hockey World Cup |
| 3 | Japan | 2026 Men's FIH Hockey World Cup |
| 4 | Malaysia | 2026 Men's FIH Hockey World Cup |
| 5 | China | |
| 6 | Egypt (H) | |
| 7 | Austria | |
| 8 | United States | |

Source: FIH
(H) Host

== Santiago ==
Tournament details
- Host country: Chile
- City: Santiago
- Dates: 1–8 March
- Teams: 8 (from 3 confederations)
- Venue: Estadio Nacional del Hockey Césped Claudia Schüler

Final positions
- Champions: Ireland
- Runner-up: France
- Third place: Wales

Tournament statistics
- Matches played: 20
- Goals scored: 102 (5.1 per match)
- Top scorer: (Scotland) Jamie Golden (9 goals)
- Best player: (France) François Goyet
- Best young player: (France) Malo Martinache
- Best goalkeeper: (Ireland) Jamie Carr

The tournament was held at the Estadio Nacional del Hockey Césped Claudia Schüler in Santiago, Chile from 28 February to 8 March 2026.

=== Preliminary round ===
All times are local (UTC−3).

==== Pool A ====
| Pos | Team | Pld | W | D | L | GF | GA | GD | Pts | Qualification |
|---|---|---|---|---|---|---|---|---|---|---|
| 1 | France | 3 | 1 | 1 | 1 | 10 | 6 | +4 | 4 | Semi-finals |
| 2 | Wales | 3 | 1 | 1 | 1 | 7 | 7 | 0 | 4 | Semi-finals |
| 3 | Scotland | 3 | 1 | 1 | 1 | 5 | 9 | −4 | 4 | Classification round |
| 4 | Chile (H) | 3 | 0 | 3 | 0 | 7 | 7 | 0 | 3 | Classification round |

Source: FIH
Rules for classification: 1) points; 2) matches won; 3) goal difference; 4) goals for; 5) head-to-head result; 6) field goals for.
(H) Hosts

1 March 2026
16:30

| France | 2–3 | Scotland |
|---|---|---|
| Xavier 5'; Charlet 20' | Report | J. Golden 25'; C. Golden 27', 30' |

Umpires:
Kelly Hudson (NZL)
James Unkles (AUS)

1 March 2026
19:45

| Wales | 2–2 | Chile |
|---|---|---|
| N. Morgan 4'; G. Furlong 47' | Report | R. Valenzuela 22'; A. Valenzuela 23' |

Umpires:
Liu Xiaoying (CHN)
Tyler Klenk (CAN)

3 March 2026
18:00

| Wales | 0–5 | France |
|---|---|---|
| | Report | Charlet 20', 41', 50'; Marqué 37', 51' |

Umpires:
Zeke Newman (AUS)
Darren Hubach (RSA)

3 March 2026
20:15

| Scotland | 2–2 | Chile |
|---|---|---|
| J. Golden 35'; Walker 54' | Report | Wolansky 32'; J. Amoroso 54' |

Umpires:
You Hyo-sik (KOR)
Laurine Delforge (BEL)

4 March 2026
18:00

| Scotland | 0–5 | Wales |
|---|---|---|
| | Report | Pritchard 4'; Newbold 10', 38'; Hutchinson 28'; Welsh 43' |

Umpires:
You Hyo-sik (KOR)
Darren Hubach (RSA)

4 March 2026
20:15

| France | 3–3 | Chile |
|---|---|---|
| Charlet 21', 51'; Marqué 56' | Report | Amoroso 15', 57'; Goñi 37' |

Umpires:
Ilanggo Kanabathu (MAS)
Jamie Telfer (SCO)

==== Pool B ====
| Pos | Team | Pld | W | D | L | GF | GA | GD | Pts | Qualification |
|---|---|---|---|---|---|---|---|---|---|---|
| 1 | Ireland | 3 | 3 | 0 | 0 | 15 | 4 | +11 | 9 | Semi-finals |
| 2 | Poland | 3 | 2 | 0 | 1 | 6 | 7 | −1 | 6 | Semi-finals |
| 3 | Canada | 3 | 1 | 0 | 2 | 10 | 9 | +1 | 3 | Classification round |
| 4 | South Korea | 3 | 0 | 0 | 3 | 5 | 16 | −11 | 0 | Classification round |

Source: FIH
Rules for classification: 1) points; 2) matches won; 3) goal difference; 4) goals for; 5) head-to-head result; 6) field goals for.

1 March 2026
12:00

| Ireland | 5–2 | Canada |
|---|---|---|
| McAllister 9'; Lynch 22'; Duncan 40'; Cole 49', 52' | Report | Childs 47'; Nicholson 50' |

Umpires:
Laurine Delforge (BEL)
Zeke Newman (AUS)

1 March 2026
14:15

| South Korea | 2–3 | Poland |
|---|---|---|
| Lim 27'; Oh 45' | Report | Jarzyński 31', 51'; Lange 53' |

Umpires:
Maggie Giddens (USA)
Darren Hubach (RSA)

3 March 2026
09:00

| Canada | 1–2 | Poland |
|---|---|---|
| Nicholson 60' | Report | Jarzyński 45'; T. Bembenek 56' |

Umpires:
Ilanggo Kanabathu (MAS)
Juan Pedro Rodríguez (ARG)

3 March 2026
11:15

| South Korea | 1–6 | Ireland |
|---|---|---|
| Jang J. 15' | Report | Williams 14'; Cole 27', 56'; Nelson 28'; Rowe 42', 48' |

Umpires:
Tyler Klenk (CAN)
Jamie Telfer (SCO)

4 March 2026
09:00

| Ireland | 4–1 | Poland |
|---|---|---|
| Rowe 15'; Cole 21'; Walker 40'; Nelson 59' | Report | Rutkowski 52' |

Umpires:
Zeke Newman (AUS)
Tyler Klenk (CAN)

4 March 2026
11:15

| Canada | 7–2 | South Korea |
|---|---|---|
| Sarmento 7'; Childs 19'; Thind 22'; Davis 39', 53'; Harris 49'; Nicholson 58' | Report | Choi 7'; Jang J. 47' |

Umpires:
James Unkles (AUS)
Juan Pedro Rodríguez (ARG)

=== Classification round ===
Crossover
6 March
Scotland | 8
South Korea | 2
6 March
Canada | 3
Chile | 2

Fifth place
7 March
Scotland | 5
Canada | 1
Seventh place
7 March
South Korea | 0 (1)
Chile (p.s.o.) | 0 (4)

==== Crossovers ====
6 March 2026
12:45

| Scotland | 8–2 | South Korea |
|---|---|---|
| J. Golden 3', 35', 52'; Walker 4', 5', 18', 49'; McConnell 43' | Report | Lim 11'; Cheon 13' |

Umpires:
Ilanggo Kanabathu (MAS)
Juan Pedro Rodríguez (ARG)

6 March 2026
15:00

| Canada | 3–2 | Chile |
|---|---|---|
| Loh 14'; Dhillon 50'; Davis 59' | Report | J. Amoroso 5'; R. Valenzuela 15' |

Umpires:
James Unkles (AUS)
Jamie Telfer (SCO)

==== Seventh and eighth place ====
7 March 2026
13:30

| South Korea | 0–0 | Chile |
|---|---|---|
| | Report |
Penalties
| Rim (penalty shoot-out missed); Bae (penalty shoot-out missed); Jin (penalty shoot-out scored) | 1–4 | (penalty shoot-out scored) Hurtado; (penalty shoot-out scored) Labbe; (penalty shoot-out scored) J. Amoroso; (penalty shoot-out scored) Gesswein |

Umpires:
Victoria Pazos (PAR)
Ilanggo Kanabathu (MAS)

==== Fifth and sixth place ====
7 March 2026
15:45

| Scotland | 5–1 | Canada |
|---|---|---|
| J. Golden 21', 26', 34', 36'; Douglas 59' | Report | Sarmento 38' |

Umpires:
James Unkles (AUS)
You Hyo-sik (KOR)

=== Medal round ===
Semi-finals
6 March
France | 4
Poland | 2
6 March
Ireland | 4
Wales | 0

Final
8 March
France | 1
Ireland | 2
Third place
8 March
Poland | 1
Wales | 2

==== Semifinals ====
6 March 2026
17:15

| France | 4–2 | Poland |
|---|---|---|
| T. Clément 15'; Branicki 20'; Esmenjaud 21'; Sellier 36' | Report | T. Bembenek 22'; Rutkowski 34' |

Umpires:
You Hyo-sik (KOR)
Darren Hubach (RSA)

6 March 2026
19:30

| Ireland | 4–0 | Wales |
|---|---|---|
| Lynch 1', 44'; Rowe 26'; Nelson 44' | Report |

Umpires:
Zeke Newman (AUS)
Tyler Klenk (CAN)

==== Third and fourth place ====
8 March 2026
13:30

| Poland | 1–2 | Wales |
|---|---|---|
| Koperski 51' | Report | G. Furlong 22', 27' |

Umpires:
Zeke Newman (AUS)
You Hyo-sik (KOR)

==== Final ====
8 March 2026
15:45

| France | 1–2 | Ireland |
|---|---|---|
| Haertelmeyer 24' | Report | Williams 26', 36' |

Umpires:
Laurine Delforge (BEL)
Darren Hubsch (RSA)

=== Goalscorers ===
There were 102 goals scored in 20 matches, for an average of 5.1 goals per match.

9 goals

- (Scotland) Jamie Golden

6 goals

- (France) Victor Charlet

5 goals

- (Ireland) Lee Cole
- (Scotland) Struan Walker

4 goals

- (Chile) Juan Amoroso
- (Ireland) Louis Rowe

3 goals

- (Canada) Sean Davis
- (Canada) Jude Nicholson
- (France) Benjamin Marqué
- (Ireland) Jonathan Lynch
- (Ireland) Greg Williams
- (Ireland) Matthew Nelson
- (Poland) Gracjan Jarzyński
- (Wales) Gareth Furlong

2 goals

- (Canada) Rowan Childs
- (Canada) Matthew Sarmento
- (Chile) Raimundo Valenzuela
- (Poland) Tomasz Bembenek
- (Poland) Wojciech Rutkowski
- (Scotland) Cameron Golden
- (South Korea) Jang Jong-hyun
- (South Korea) Lim Do-hyun
- (Wales) Fred Newbold

1 goal

- (Canada) Roopkanwar Dhillon
- (Canada) Thomson Harris
- (Canada) Hudson Loh
- (Canada) Robin Thind
- (Chile) Vicente Goñi
- (Chile) Agustín Valenzuela
- (Chile) Sebastián Wolansky
- (France) Stanislas Branicki
- (France) Timothée Clément
- (France) Xavier Esmenjaud
- (France) Louis Haertelmeyer
- (France) Corentin Sellier
- (France) Gaspard Xavier
- (Ireland) Jeremy Duncan
- (Ireland) Adam McAllister
- (Ireland) Benjamin Walker
- (Poland) Maksymilian Koperski
- (Poland) Michał Lange
- (Scotland) Ali Douglas
- (Scotland) Andrew McConnell
- (South Korea) Cheon Min-su
- (South Korea) Choi Chank-yu
- (South Korea) Oh Se-yong
- (Wales) Dale Hutchinson
- (Wales) Jack Pritchard
- (Wales) Nicholas Morgan
- (Wales) Sam Welsh

Source: FIH

=== Final standings ===
| Pos | Team | Qualification |
|---|---|---|
| 1 | Ireland | 2026 Men's FIH Hockey World Cup |
| 2 | France | 2026 Men's FIH Hockey World Cup |
| 3 | Wales | 2026 Men's FIH Hockey World Cup |
| 4 | Poland | |
| 5 | Scotland | |
| 6 | Canada | |
| 7 | Chile (H) | |
| 8 | South Korea | |

Source: FIH
(H) Host

== Qualified teams ==
The following seven teams qualified for the 2026 Men's FIH Hockey World Cup in Belgium and the Netherlands.

| Team | Qualified on | Qualified as | Previous appearances in the Men's FIH Hockey World Cup^{1} |
|---|---|---|---|
| England | 6 March 2026 | Ismailia champions | 14 (1973, 1975, 1978, 1982, 1986, 1990, 1994, 2002, 2006, 2010, 2014, 2018, 2023) |
| Pakistan | 6 March 2026 | Ismailia runners-up | 13 (1971, 1973, 1975, 1978, 1982, 1986, 1990, 1994, 1998, 2002, 2006, 2010, 2018) |
| Japan | 7 March 2026 | Ismailia third-place | 5 (1971, 1973, 2002, 2006, 2023) |
| Ireland | 6 March 2026 | Santiago champions | 3 (1978, 1990, 2018) |
| France | 6 March 2026 | Santiago runners-up | 4 (1971, 1990, 2018, 2023) |
| Wales | 8 March 2026 | Santiago third-place | 1 (2023) |
| Malaysia | 6 March 2026 | Highest ranked fourth-place | 9 (1973, 1975, 1978, 1982, 1998, 2002, 2014, 2018, 2023) |

== See also ==
- 2026 Men's FIH Hockey World Cup
- 2026 Women's FIH Hockey World Cup Qualifiers
