= 2019–20 Men's Hockey League season =

British field hockey season

Men's England Hockey League
- Season: 2019–20
- Champions: Surbiton (3rd title); Beeston (cup)
- Relegated: Reading
- Euro Hockey League: Surbiton; Hampstead & Westminster
- Matches: 90
- Goals: 495 (5.5 per match)
- Top goalscorer: Luke Taylor (28 goals)
- Biggest home win: Wimbledon 12–0 University of Exeter
- Biggest away win: Brooklands 0–12 Surbiton
- Highest scoring: Wimbledon 12–0 University of Exeter; Brooklands 0–12 Surbiton; Surbiton 8–4 Hampstead & Westminster

The 2019–20 Men's England Hockey League season was the 2019–20 season of England's field hockey league structure. The season started on 14 September 2019 and was due to end in March 2020, but finished on 12 September 2020 due to the COVID-19 pandemic in the United Kingdom.

The defending champions were Hampstead and Westminster. Old Georgians, winners of the Hockey League Conference East replaced the relegated Sevenoaks.

On 17 March 2020, the play-offs were suspended due to COVID. The play-offs were officially cancelled on 28 April 2020 and Surbiton were crowned champions.

Beeston Hockey Club won the delayed Championship Cup on 12 September 2020, defeating Bowdon and Fareham respectively.

== Regular season ==
=== League table ===
Pos	Team	Pld	W	D	L	GF	GA	GD	Pts	Qualification or relegation
1	Surbiton (C)	18	15	2	1	93	25	+68	47	Qualification for the Euro Hockey League
2	Hampstead & Westminster	18	13	2	3	64	38	+26	41	Qualification for the Euro Hockey League
3	Wimbledon	18	12	3	3	73	29	+44	39	
4	Old Georgians	18	11	4	3	63	40	+23	37	
5	Holcombe	18	7	5	6	51	53	−2	26	
6	Beeston	18	6	2	10	37	41	−4	20	
7	East Grinstead	18	4	2	12	31	65	−34	14	
8	Brooklands	18	4	1	13	28	64	−36	13	
9	University of Exeter	18	3	2	13	28	77	−49	11	
10	Reading (R)	18	2	3	13	29	65	−36	9	Relegation to Division One

Source: England Hockey
(C) Champions; (R) Relegated

=== Results ===
Home \ Away	BEE	BRO	EGS	H&W	HOL	OG	REA	SUR	UOE	WIM
Beeston	—	3–1	2–1	3–4	3–4	1–2	2–2	1–7	2–1	3–2
Brooklands	2–1	—	2–1	3–4	1–1	1–3	4–1	0–12	2–3	1–3
East Grinstead	1–5	5–3	—	1–6	4–3	0–5	2–1	0–5	2–2	3–4
Hampstead & Westminster	2–0	2–1	3–0	—	4–4	3–4	5–0	1–1	6–3	1–3
Holcombe	2–2	3–1	5–3	1–6	—	4–5	6–2	2–3	3–2	3–3
Old Georgians	2–1	3–1	5–0	1–3	3–3	—	5–2	3–4	5–1	3–3
Reading	2–1	3–1	1–3	3–4	2–3	4–4	—	1–10	0–3	1–3
Surbiton	4–2	7–0	4–1	8–4	3–1	3–3	4–0	—	7–0	1–3
University of Exeter	0–5	2–3	2–2	1–4	0–2	2–5	3–2	2–8	—	1–7
Wimbledon	2–0	7–1	7–2	1–2	6–1	4–2	2–2	1–2	12–0	—

Source: England Hockey
Legend: Blue = home team win; Yellow = draw; Red = away team win.

=== Top goalscorers ===
As of 15 March 2020

Rank	Player	Club	FG	PC	PS	Goals
1	(England) Luke Taylor	Surbiton	0	27	1	28
2	(England) Ed Horler	Wimbledon	15	9	0	24
3	(South Africa) Matthew Guise-Brown	Hampstead & Westminster	0	23	0	23
4	(Scotland) Alan Forsyth	Surbiton	19	0	1	20
5	(England) Nick Bandurak	Holcombe	13	4	0	17
6	(England) Sam Ward	Old Georgians	9	6	1	16
7	(England) Ben Boon	Surbiton	14	1	0	15
7	(England) Tom Carson	Old Georgians	12	3	0	15
9	(Wales) Ben Francis	Wimbledon	13	0	0	13
10	(England) James Tindall	Old Georgians	8	4	0	12

== Play-offs ==
The semi-finals were scheduled to be played on 29 March at the home club venues and the final was scheduled to be played on 5 April at the Lee Valley Hockey and Tennis Centre in London. On 17 March 2020, the play-offs were suspended due to the COVID-19 pandemic in the United Kingdom. The play-offs were officially cancelled on 28 April 2020

=== Bracket ===
Semi-finals
29 March – Long Ditton
Surbiton
Old Georgians	cancelled
29 March – London
Hampstead & Westminster
Wimbledon	cancelled

Final
5 April – London
N/A
N/A	cancelled

== England Hockey Men's Championship Cup ==
=== Quarter-finals ===
Team 1	Team 2	Score
Beeston	Belper	12-2
Southgate	University of Birmingham	3-2
Bowdon	Timperley	0-0 (4-1 pens)
Fareham	Canterbury	w/o - conceded

=== Semi-finals ===
Team 1	Team 2	Score
Bowdon	Beeston	2-2 (7-8p)
Fareham	Southgate	4-3

=== Final ===
Team 1	Team 2	Score	Scorers
Beeston	Fareham	9-1	Dixon, Apoola (4), Griffiths (3), Alcalde / Boxall

Beeston
Simon Hujwan (gk), Joshua Pavis, Ollie Willars, Kyle Marshall, Robbie Gleeson, Gareth Griffiths, Tom Crowson, Nick Park, Henry Croft, Alex Blumfield, Adam Dixon, Lucas Alcalde, Chris Proctor, Sam Apoola, Matthew Crookshanks, James Hunt.
Fareham
Rory Kemp (gk), Sam Ratcliffe, Tom Larcombe, Christian McKenna, Shane Vincent, Niall Stott, Danny Rawlings, Fergus Jackson, Josh Steel, Alex Boxall, Phillip Larcombe; subs-Jamie Young, Neil West, Dylan Coleman, Christopher Tagg, Alex Beckett.

== See also ==
- 2019–20 Women's England Hockey League season
