= 2025 Men's EuroHockey Championship II =

European field hockey competition

Tournament details
- Host country: Portugal
- City: Lousada
- Dates: 27 July–2 August
- Teams: 8 (from 1 confederation)
- Venue: AD Lousada

Final positions
- Champions: Wales (1st title)
- Runner-up: Ireland
- Third place: Scotland

Tournament statistics
- Matches played: 20
- Goals scored: 114 (5.7 per match)
- Top scorer: (Scotland) Struan Walker (10 goals)
- Best player: (Wales) Jacob Draper
- Best goalkeeper: (Ireland) Jamie Carr

The 2025 Men's EuroHockey Championship II was the eleventh edition of the Men's EuroHockey Championship II, the second level of the men's European field hockey championships organized by the European Hockey Federation.

It was held from 27 July to 2 August 2025 at AD Lousada in Lousada, Portugal. The finalists qualified directly for the 2027 Men's EuroHockey Championship in London, England. The top three teams qualified for the 2026 World Cup Qualifiers.

Wales won their first Championship II title by defeating the defending champions Ireland 3–1 in a shoot-out after the final finished 1–1 in regular time. Scotland won the bronze medal by defeating Italy 5–2.

== Qualification ==
The eight teams qualified based on their performance in the 2025 Men's EuroHockey Championship Qualifiers, with the runners-up, third, fourth and fifth-placed teams qualifying for the Championship II. Ukraine withdrew and Turkey was asked to take over the place but declined. The second highest-ranked team in the qualifiers Croatia accepted the invitation.

Dates	Event	Location	Quotas	Qualifiers
22–25 August 2024	EuroHockey Championship Qualifiers	Vienna, Austria	4	~~Ukraine~~; Scotland; Portugal; Switzerland; Croatia
22–25 August 2024	EuroHockey Championship Qualifiers	Dublin, Ireland	4	Wales; Ireland; Czechia; Italy
Total			8	

== Squads ==
Croatia
Czechia
Ireland

Head coach: Mark Tumilty

2. Jamie Carr (GK)
7. Timothy Cross
8. Jonathan McKee
9. Matthew Nelson
10. Daragh Walsh
15. Kyle Marshall (C)
17. Sean Murray
18. Mark McNellis
19. Peter McKibbin
20. Jeremy Duncan
25. Jonathan Lynch
26. Peter Brown
28. Benjamin Nelson
29. Lee Cole
30. Louis Rowe
39. Fergus Gibson
43. Luke Roleston (GK)
47. Adam McAllister
Italy
Portugal
Scotland

Head coach: Jonny Caren

No.	Pos.	Player	Date of birth (age)	Caps	Club
2	DF	Andrew Lochrin	18 March 2001 (aged 24)	22	(Scotland) Western Wildcats
3	DF	Andrew McAlister	27 April 2001 (aged 24)	15	(Scotland) Western Wildcats
6	FW	Ali Douglas	13 November 2003 (aged 21)	21	(England) Holcombe
8	MF	Rob Field (Captain)	14 April 1994 (aged 31)	43	(England) Holcombe
9	FW	Andy McConnell	5 January 2000 (aged 25)	40	(Germany) Harvestehuder THC
10	FW	Rob Harwood	15 July 1997 (aged 28)	50	(Scotland) Western Wildcats
13	FW	Struan Walker	6 July 2002 (aged 23)	40	(England) Surbiton
20	MF	Jamie Golden	24 December 2001 (aged 23)	35	(Scotland) Western Wildcats
21	FW	David Nairn	30 June 2000 (aged 25)	21	(Scotland) Grange
22	GK	Calum Douglas	25 March 2005 (aged 20)	15	(England) Surbiton
24	DF	Jamie Croll	7 January 2004 (aged 21)	12	(Scotland) Edinburgh Univ
25	FW	Jamie Green	1 October 2005 (aged 19)	6	(Scotland) Grange
29	FW	Keir Robb	19 January 2002 (aged 23)	21	(Scotland) Edinburgh Univ
30	MF	Thomas Austin	20 April 2007 (aged 18)	22	(Scotland) Western Wildcats
32	DF	Callum Mackenzie	31 December 1998 (aged 26)	59	(England) Wimbledon
33	GK	Matthew Taylor	25 April 2001 (aged 24)	1	(Scotland) Edinburgh Univ
34	FW	Alasdair Richmond	6 August 2000 (aged 24)	13	(England) Beeston
36	FW	Iain McFadden	26 March 2002 (aged 23)	11	(Scotland) Edinburgh Univ

Switzerland

Head coach: Jaïr Levie

1. Philip Nitsch (GK)
2. Clemént Thijs
3. Nico Muggli
5. Maurizio Ribaudo
6. Louis Thijs
7. Fabio Landtwing
8. Léonard Kraxner
9. Mika Conrad
10. Loris Grandchamp (C)
11. Elias Brönnimann
12. Jens Flück
16. Fabio Reinhard
18. Lorenz Gassner
20. Yannick Hug
21. Lukas Müller
22. Lukas Egloff (GK)
23. Bastian Thoma
25. Matthieu Wyss-Chodat
28. Lukas Hengartner
36. Matthias Mohrhauer
Wales

Head coach: Daniel Newcombe

No.	Pos.	Player	Date of birth (age)	Caps	Club
3	DF	Daniel Kyriakides	21 March 1995 (aged 30)	138	(Germany) Club an der Alster
5	MF	Alf Dinnie	1 December 1994 (aged 30)	65	(Wales) Cardiff & Met
6	DF	Jacob Draper	24 July 1998 (aged 27)	91	(Netherlands) Pinoké
7	MF	Gareth Griffiths	13 March 1999 (aged 26)	45	(England) Beeston
9	MF	Rupert Shipperley (co-Captain)	21 November 1992 (aged 32)	116	(England) Hampstead & Westminster
13	MF	Dale Hutchinson	21 November 1992 (aged 32)	123	(England) Hampstead & Westminster
14	MF	Owen Sutton	30 July 2004 (aged 20)	20	(England) Wimbledon
15	MF	Rhys Bradshaw	19 September 2000 (aged 24)	73	(England) Wimbledon
17	MF	Fred Newbold	29 March 2001 (aged 24)	38	(England) Wimbledon
18	DF	Gareth Furlong	10 May 1992 (aged 33)	158	(England) Surbiton
20	FW	Jolyon Morgan	9 March 1999 (aged 26)	52	(England) Hampstead & Westminster
23	FW	Jack Pritchard	14 August 1993 (aged 31)	39	(Wales) Cardiff & Met
24	DF	Hywel Jones	9 July 1997 (aged 28)	78	(England) Hampstead & Westminster
25	FW	Ben Francis (co-Captain)	20 March 1996 (aged 29)	120	(England) Wimbledon
33	GK	Rhys Payne	7 June 2001 (aged 24)	4	(Wales) Cardiff & Met
44	DF	Nicholas Morgan	5 January 2002 (aged 23)	11	(England) Surbiton
50	GK	Toby Reynolds-Cotterill	6 August 1997 (aged 27)	43	(England) Hampstead & Westminster
61	MF	John Bennett	5 July 2003 (aged 22)	12	(England) Sevenoaks

== Preliminary round ==
=== Pool A ===
Pos	Team	Pld	W	D	L	GF	GA	GD	Pts	Qualification
1	Ireland	3	3	0	0	15	3	+12	9	Semi-finals
2	Italy	3	2	0	1	5	3	+2	6	Semi-finals
3	Czechia	3	1	0	2	6	9	−3	3	
4	Portugal (H)	3	0	0	3	2	13	−11	0	

Source: FIH
Rules for classification: 1) points; 2) matches won; 3) goal difference; 4) goals for; 5) head-to-head result; 6) field goals for.
(H) Hosts

27 July 2025
15:45

Ireland	5–3	Czechia
McKee 28', 34'; Cole 37', 42'; M. Nelson 42'	Report	Gerlický 13'; Plochý 23'; Soukup 32'

Umpires:
Duncan Ruzzak (SCO)
Ana Faias (POR)

27 July 2025
18:00

Italy	2–1	Portugal
Arosio 31', 47'	Report	L. Halfmann 24'

Umpires:
Benjamin Messerli (SUI)
Christian Phillips-Adams (WAL)

29 July 2025
15:15

Italy	0–1	Ireland
	Report	Duncan 2'

Umpires:
Ana Faias (POR)
Benjamin Messerli (SUI)

29 July 2025
17:30

Czechia	2–1	Portugal
F. Toms 9'; Homolka 60'	Report	Castro 21'

Umpires:
Robert Argent (IRE)
Duncan Ruzzak (SCO)

30 July 2025
15:45

Czechia	1–3	Italy
Šmíd 21'	Report	Giuliani 4'; Mondo 15'; Brocco 58'

Umpires:
Christian Phillips-Adams (WAL)
Daniel Denta (DEN)

30 July 2025
18:00

Ireland	9–0	Portugal
McNellis 10'; Gibson 24'; B. Nelson 25'; Rowe 25', 35'; Lynch 33'; Cole 43'; Murray 55'; Duncan 57'	Report

Umpires:
Alessio Fiorenza (ITA)
Ivan Grgurev (CRO)

=== Pool B ===
Pos	Team	Pld	W	D	L	GF	GA	GD	Pts	Qualification
1	Wales	3	2	1	0	19	3	+16	7	Semi-finals
2	Scotland	3	2	1	0	14	8	+6	7	Semi-finals
3	Switzerland	3	0	1	2	7	10	−3	1	
4	Croatia	3	0	1	2	6	25	−19	1	

Source: FIH
Rules for classification: 1) points; 2) matches won; 3) goal difference; 4) goals for; 5) head-to-head result; 6) field goals for.

27 July 2025
11:15

Wales	3–1	Switzerland
Pritchard 5'; Bradshaw 9'; Griffiths 17'	Report	Hengartner 40'

Umpires:
Raphaël Adrien (GER)
Ivan Grgurev (CRO)

27 July 2025
13:30

Scotland	8–3	Croatia
Walker 6', 22', 55', 59'; Field 12'; Golden 15', 35'; McConnell 40'	Report	Zidanić 5'; Krleža 38'; Ilinović 39'

Umpires:
Robert Argent (IRE)
Alessio Fiorenza (ITA)

28 July 2025
15:15

Switzerland	3–3	Croatia
Conrad 10'; Kraxner 24'; Hengartner 58'	Report	L. Bachmann 18', 44', 51'

Umpires:
Alessio Fiorenza (ITA)
Tomáš Holek (CZE)

28 July 2025
17:30

Scotland	2–2	Wales
Walker 26', 47'	Report	N. Morgan 12'; Griffiths 60'

Umpires:
Daniel Denta (DEN)
Raphaël Adrien (GER)

30 July 2025
11:15

Wales	14–0	Croatia
Pritchard 1', 4', 18', 46'; N. Morgan 2', 10'; Furlong 8', 29', 48'; Griffiths 9', 27'; Newbold 14', 21'; Bennett 21'	Report

Umpires:
Ana Faias (POR)
Duncan Ruzzak (SCO)

30 July 2025
13:30

Switzerland	3–4	Scotland
Hug 7', 24'; Brönnimann 15'	Report	Green 6', 8'; Golden 15', 51'

Umpires:
Tomáš Holek (CZE)
Raphaël Adrien (GER)

== Fifth to eighth place classification ==
=== Pool C ===
The points obtained in the preliminary round against the other team were carried over.

Pos	Team	Pld	W	D	L	GF	GA	GD	Pts
5	Czechia	3	2	1	0	7	3	+4	7
6	Switzerland	3	1	2	0	11	10	+1	5
7	Croatia	3	1	1	1	6	7	−1	4
8	Portugal (H)	3	0	0	3	7	11	−4	0

Source: FIH
Rules for classification: 1) points; 2) matches won; 3) goal difference; 4) goals for; 5) head-to-head result; 6) field goals for.
(H) Hosts

1 August 2025
10:15

Portugal	1–3	Croatia
Franco 2'	Report	Krleža 4', 20'; Bachmann 49'

Umpires:
Tomás Holek (CZE)
Alessio Fiorenza (ITA)

1 August 2025
12:30

Czechia	2–2	Switzerland
Klaban 42'; Uhlíř 60'	Report	Grandchamp 23', 42'

Umpires:
Ivan Grgurev (CRO)
Daniel Denta (DEN)

2 August 2025
09:00

Czechia	3–0	Croatia
Soukup 43'; Šmíd 54'; Šesták 58'	Report

Umpires:
Christian Phillips-Adams (WAL)
Duncan Ruzzak (SCO)

2 August 2025
11:15

Switzerland	6–5	Portugal
Grandchamp 21', 30', 53', 57'; Gassner 41'; Mohrhauer 59'	Report	L. Halfmann 13'; Q. Halfmann 14'; Castro 16', 31'; Coelho 33'

Umpires:
Tomás Holek (CZE)
Ivan Grgurev (CRO)

== First to fourth place classification ==
=== Bracket ===
Semi-finals
1 August
Wales	5
Italy	0
1 August
Ireland	3
Scotland	1

Final
2 August
Wales (p.s.o.)	1 (3)
Ireland	1 (1)
Third place
2 August
Italy	2
Scotland	5

=== Semi-finals ===
1 August 2025
14:45

Wales	5–0	Italy
Francis 27'; Griffiths 32'; N. Morgan 40'; Pritchard 55'; Newbold 59'	Report

Umpires:
Robert Argent (IRE)
Ana Faias (POR)

1 August 2025
17:00

Ireland	3–1	Scotland
Cole 3'; Rowe 40', 44'	Report	Field 46'

Umpires:
Benjamin Messerli (SUI)
Christian Phillips-Adams (WAL)

=== Third and fourth place ===
2 August 2025
13:45

Italy	2–5	Scotland
Clement 11'; Arosio 14'	Report	Golden 16'; Walker 23', 36', 57', 60'

Umpires:
Raphaël Adrien (GER)
Robert Argent (IRE)

=== Final ===
2 August 2025
16:00

Wales	1–1	Ireland
Pritchard 19'	Report	Duncan 14'
Penalties
Griffiths (penalty shoot-out scored); Newbold (penalty shoot-out missed); Francis (penalty shoot-out scored); Pritchard (penalty shoot-out scored)	3–1	(penalty shoot-out missed) Murray; (penalty shoot-out missed) McKee; (penalty shoot-out scored) Walsh; (penalty shoot-out missed) Rowe

Umpires:
Benjamin Messerli (SUI)
Daniel Denta (DEN)

== Statistics ==
=== Final standings ===
Pos	Team	Qualification
1	Wales	2026 World Cup Qualifiers and 2027 EuroHockey Championship
2	Ireland	2026 World Cup Qualifiers and 2027 EuroHockey Championship
3	Scotland	2026 World Cup Qualifiers
4	Italy	
5	Czechia	
6	Switzerland	
7	Croatia	
8	Portugal (H)	

Source: FIH
(H) Host

=== Awards ===
The following awards were given at the conclusion of the tournament.

Award	Player
Player of the Tournament	(Wales) Jacob Draper
Leading goalscorer	(Scotland) Struan Walker
Goalkeeper of the Tournament	(Ireland) Jamie Carr

=== Goalscorers ===
There have been 114 goals scored in 20 matches, for an average of 5.7 goals per match.

10 goals

- (Scotland) Struan Walker

7 goals

- (Wales) Jack Pritchard

6 goals

- (Switzerland) Loris Grandchamp

5 goals

- (Wales) Gareth Griffiths
- (Scotland) Jamie Golden

4 goals

- (Croatia) Lucas Bachmann
- (Ireland) Lee Cole
- (Ireland) Louis Rowe
- (Wales) Nicholas Morgan

3 goals

- (Croatia) Josip Krleža
- (Ireland) Jeremy Duncan
- (Italy) Davide Arosio
- (Portugal) Rodrigo Castro
- (Wales) Gareth Furlong
- (Wales) Frederick Newbold

2 goals

- (Czech Republic) Štěpán Šmíd
- (Czech Republic) Vít Soukup
- (Ireland) Jonathan McKee
- (Portugal) Laurens Halfmann
- (Scotland) Robert Field
- (Scotland) Jamie Green
- (Switzerland) Lukas Hengartner
- (Switzerland) Jannick Hug

1 goal

- (Croatia) Mario Ilinović
- (Croatia) Andrej Zidanić
- (Czech Republic) Eduard Gerlický
- (Czech Republic) Jakub Homolka
- (Czech Republic) Jakub Klaban
- (Czech Republic) Lukáš Plochý
- (Czech Republic) Kryštof Šesták
- (Czech Republic) František Toms
- (Czech Republic) Adam Uhlíř
- (Ireland) Fergus Gibson
- (Ireland) Jonathan Lynch
- (Ireland) Mark McNellis
- (Ireland) Sean Murray
- (Ireland) Benjamin Nelson
- (Ireland) Matthew Nelson
- (Italy) Claudio Brocco
- (Italy) Geronimo Clement
- (Italy) Davide Giuliani
- (Italy) Manuel Mondo
- (Portugal) Joaquín Coelho
- (Portugal) David Franco
- (Portugal) Quentin Halfmann
- (Scotland) Andrew McConnell
- (Switzerland) Elias Brönnimann
- (Switzerland) Mika Conrad
- (Switzerland) Lorenz Gassner
- (Switzerland) Léonard Kraxner
- (Switzerland) Matthias Mohrhauer
- (Wales) Jonathan Bennett
- (Wales) Rhys Bradshaw
- (Wales) Benjamin Francis

Source: FIH

== See also ==
- 2025 Men's EuroHockey Championship
- 2025 Men's EuroHockey Championship III
- 2025 Women's EuroHockey Championship II
