= Owen Sutton =

Welsh field hockey player

Personal information
- Born: 30 July 2004 (age 22)

Sport
- Sport: Field hockey
- Position: Midfield
Senior career
Years	Team	Caps	Goals
2023–2025	Beeston	-	-
2025–2026	Wimbledon	-	-
National team
Years	Team	Caps	Goals
2023–	Wales	20	-
Medal record
Representing Wales
European Championship II
Gold medal – first place	2025 Lousada	Team

Owen Sutton (born 30 July 2004) is a Welsh field hockey player who has represented Wales. In 2025, he won a gold medal at the European Championship II.

== Biography ==
Sutton was educated at Stover School and Exeter College, Devon and studied Sport and Exercise Science at Sheffield Hallam University. While at University he played for Sheffield Hockey Club. Sutton then played club hockey for Beeston in the Men's England Hockey League and while at Beeston, made his Welsh debut against Ireland in July 2023.

Sutton was also added to the Great Britain Hockey centralised programme in 2024 and was also named in the Welsh squad for the 2025 campaigns.

In 2025, he left Beeston and signed for Wimbledon Hockey Club for the 2025–26 season.

In 2025, he helped Wales win the gold medal at the European Championship II, defeating Ireland in the final.
