= Peter Swainson =

Welsh field hockey player

Personal information
- Born: 27 July 1982 (age 44) Cheltenham, England

Sport
- Sport: Field hockey
- Position: Defender
Senior career
Years	Team	Caps	Goals
2000–2002	Oxford Hawks	-	-
2002-2006	Exeter Univ	-	-
2006–2009	Reading	-	-
2009–2010	Hampstead & Westminster	-	-
2010–2012	Wimbledon	-	-
2012–2015	Oxted	-	-
National team
Years	Team	Caps	Goals
2005–2015	Wales	104	(2)

Peter Swainson (born 27 July 1982) is a former field hockey player who represented Wales. He competed for Wales at the 2014 Commonwealth Games.

== Biography ==
Swainson, born in Cheltenham, England, was educated at Dragon School and St Edward's School, Oxford and played club hockey for Oxford Hawks Hockey Club in the Men's England Hockey League.

He studied History and Law at the University of Exeter, where he played club hockey for the University of Exeter Hockey Club. He made his full Welsh debut in 2005 and helped Exeter win the BUCS gold medal in 2006.

After university he signed for Reading Hockey Club and then played for Hampstead & Westminster Hockey Club and Wimbledon Hockey Club before joining Oxted Hockey Club.

While at Oxted in 2014, he was selected to represent the Welsh team at the 2014 Commonwealth Games in Glasgow, Scotland in the men's tournament.

Swainson was a history teacher from 2014 to 2023 before becoming Head of Co-Curricular at Harrow International School, Bangkok.
