= Toby Reynolds-Cotterill =

Welsh field hockey player (born 1997)

Personal information
- Born: 6 August 1997 (age 29) Wales

Sport
- Sport: Field hockey
- Position: Goalkeeper
Senior career
Years	Team	Caps	Goals
2012–2015	Team Bath Buccaneers	-	-
2015–2018	Loughborough Students	-	-
2018–2025	Hampstead & Westminster	-	-
2025–2026	Wimbledon	-	-
National team
Years	Team	Caps	Goals
2021–	Wales	43	-
2023–	Great Britain	7	-
Medal record
Men's field hockey
Representing Great Britain
EuroHockey Championship
Silver medal – second place	2022–23	Team
Representing Wales
European Championship II
Gold medal – first place	2025 Lousada	Team

Tobias Reynolds-Cotterill (born 6 August 1997) is a Welsh field hockey player who has represented Great Britain and Wales. He competed for Wales at the 2022 Commonwealth Games.

== Biography ==
Reynolds-Cotterill was educated at Colston's School, King Edward's School, Bath and Millfield School and studied at Loughborough University.

He played club hockey for Team Bath Buccaneers before joining Hampstead & Westminster Hockey Club in the Men's England Hockey League.

He made his Welsh debut against Malaysia during October 2021. and was selected to represent Wales at the 2022 Commonwealth Games in Birmingham, helping his nation to a sixth place finish during the men's tournament after being defeated by New Zealand in the fifth place play off match on 7 August 2022.

In 2023, Reynolds-Cotterill made his Great Britain debut during the 2022–23 Men's FIH Pro League, winning a silver medal and helped Wales qualify for their first World Cup in 2023. Additionally he was part of the Welsh team that played at the 2023 Men's EuroHockey Championship.

He was selected for the Great Britain 2024 Summer Olympics programme but missed out on the final team selection. In 2025, he played in the Indian Hockey League for Kalinga Lancers.

In 2025, he helped Wales win the gold medal at the European Championship II, defeating Ireland in the final. He joined Wimbledon for the 2025–26 season.
