= Rhys Payne =

Welsh field hockey player

Personal information
- Born: 7 June 2001 (age 25)

Sport
- Sport: Field hockey
- Position: Goalkeeper
Senior career
Years	Team	Caps	Goals
2019–2025	Cardiff & Met	-	-
National team
Years	Team	Caps	Goals
2021–	Wales	4	-
Medal record
Representing Wales
European Championship II
Gold medal – first place	2025 Lousada	Team

Rhys Payne (born 7 June 2001) is a Welsh field hockey player who has represented Wales. In 2025, he won a gold medal at the European Championship II.

== Biography ==
Payne was educated at Cardiff and Vale College where he was part of the Welsh U19s. He then studied Sports Coaching at Cardiff Metropolitan University from 2019 to 2023. While at university he played club hockey for Cardiff & Met Hockey Club in the Men's England Hockey League.

He made his Welsh debut against Malaysia on 12 October 2021 and was part of the Welsh team at the 2023 World Cup, which was the first time in their history that Wales had appeared in the world Cup. He sustained a knee injury during the World Cup which left him out of Welsh international hockey for two years.

During his injury recovery he helped coach the Cardiff & met team. On his return in 2025, he helped Wales win the gold medal at the European Championship II, defeating Ireland in the final.
