= Louis Rowe =

Louis Rowe may refer to:

- Louis Rowe (basketball)
- Louis Rowe (field hockey)
