= Benjamin Francis =

Welsh field hockey player

Personal information
- Born: 20 March 1996 (age 30) Wales

Sport
- Sport: Field hockey
- Position: Forward
Senior career
Years	Team	Caps	Goals
2016–2017	Exeter Univ	-	-
2017–2018	Reading	-	-
2018–2019	Crefelder	-	-
2019–2026	Wimbledon	-	-
National team
Years	Team	Caps	Goals
2015–	Wales	120	-
Medal record
Representing Wales
European Championship II
Gold medal – first place	2025 Lousada	Team

Benjamin Francis (born 20 March 1996) is a Welsh field hockey player who has represented Wales. He competed for Wales at two Commonwealth Games.

== Biography ==
Francis played club hockey for Swansea Bay Hockey Club and went on to gain caps for Wales at U16, U18 and U21 level. He studied Economics at the University of Exeter, where he played club hockey for the University of Exeter Hockey Club.

He made his full Welsh debut against Scotland in 2015 and won a silver medal at the 2017 Sultan of Johor Trophy before joining Reading Hockey Club in the Men's England Hockey League. While at Reading in 2018, he was selected to represent the Welsh team at the 2018 Commonwealth Games in Gold Coast, Australia.

After playing in Dutch league for Crefleder, Francis joined Wimbledon for the 2019–20 season.

Francis was selected to represent Wales again at the 2022 Commonwealth Games in Birmingham, helping his nation to a sixth place finish during the men's tournament after being defeated by New Zealand in the fifth place play off match on 7 August 2022.

In 2023, Francis was part of the Welsh team at the 2023 World Cup, which was the first time in their history that Wales had appeared in the world Cup. Additionally he was part of the Welsh team that played at the 2023 Men's EuroHockey Championship.

In 2025, he helped Wales win the gold medal at the European Championship II, defeating Ireland in the final.
