= Rhys Bradshaw =

Welsh field hockey player

Personal information
- Born: 19 September 2000 (age 25) Wales

Sport
- Sport: Field hockey
- Position: Midfield
Senior career
Years	Team	Caps	Goals
–2017	Bridgend	-	-
2017–2019	Cardiff & Met	-	-
2019–2022	Exeter Univ	-	-
2022–2025	Wimbledon	-	-
2025–2026	Hampstead & Westminster	-	-
National team
Years	Team	Caps	Goals
2018–	Wales	73	-
Medal record
Representing Wales
European Championship II
Gold medal – first place	2025 Lousada	Team

Rhys Bradshaw (born 19 December 2000) is a Welsh field hockey player who has represented Wales. He competed for Wales at the 2022 Commonwealth Games.

== Biography ==
Bradshaw played club hockey for Bridgend Hockey Club before joining Cardiff & Met Hockey Club. While at Cardiff he made his Welsh debut against Poland in 2018.

In 2019, he joined University of Exeter Hockey Club in the Men's England Hockey League before moving to Wimbledon Hockey Club for the 2022–23 season.

Bradshaw was selected to represent Wales at the 2022 Commonwealth Games in Birmingham, helping his nation to a sixth place finish during the men's tournament after being defeated by New Zealand in the fifth place play off match on 7 August 2022.

He was also part of the Welsh team at the 2023 World Cup, which was the first time in their history that Wales had appeared in the world Cup. Additionally he was part of the Welsh team that played at the 2023 Men's EuroHockey Championship.

In 2025, he helped Wales win the gold medal at the European Championship II, defeating Ireland in the final.

He joined Hampstead & Westminster for the 2025–26 season.
