= Jamie Green (field hockey) =

Scottish field hockey player

Personal information
- Born: 1 October 2005 (age 20) Scotland

Sport
- Sport: Field hockey
- Position: Forward
Senior career
| Years | Team | Caps | Goals |
| –2023 | Clydesdale | - | - |
| 2023–2025 | Grange | - | - |
National team
| Years | Team | Caps | Goals |
| – | Scotland | 6 | - |
Medal record
Representing Scotland
European Championship II
| Bronze medal – third place | 2025 Lousada | Team |

Jamie Green (born 1 October 2005) is a Scottish field hockey player who has represented Scotland and won a bronze medal at the Men's EuroHockey Championship II.

== Biography ==
Green studied Business at Heriot-Watt University, which was the reason for him moving to Edinburgh to play club hockey for Grange Hockey Club in the Scottish Hockey Premiership from 2023.

He made his Scotland debut in 2024.

In 2025, he helped Scotland win the bronze medal at the 2025 Men's EuroHockey Championship II in Lousada, Portugal, defeating Italy in the third place play off.
