= Hockey Wales =

Governing body of field hockey in Wales

- Hoci Cymru (Welsh)
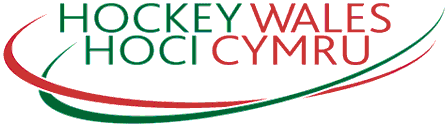
- Sport: Hockey
- Jurisdiction: National
- Founded: 1996
- Location: Sport Wales National Centre, Cardiff, Wales
- CEO: Paul Whapham
- Secretary: Debbie Wakeford
- Men's coach: Danny Newcombe
- Women's coach: Kevin Johnson
- Replaced: Welsh Hockey Union; Welsh Hockey Association; Welsh Women's Hockey Association

Official website
- www.hockeywales.org.uk
- (Wales)

Hockey Wales (Welsh: Hoci Cymru) is the national governing body for field hockey in Wales. It was established as Welsh Hockey Union in 1996 by the merger of Welsh Hockey Association and Welsh Women's Hockey Association, and rebranded to the current name in 2011.

The association is responsible for all hockey activities in Wales, and organizes national men's and women's hockey tournaments. Internationally, Welsh players compete at the Summer Olympic Games as part of the Great Britain team. In other competitions including the Commonwealth Games and the EuroHockey championships, the association fields standalone women's team and men's team.

== History ==
The first hockey clubs were established in Wales in 1896. The Welsh Hockey Association was established in the same year as the governing body for men's hockey in Wales. The Welsh Women's Hockey Association was founded in the subsequent year. The two associations merged in 1996 to form the Welsh Hockey Union. It was registered on 8 September 2003 at the Companies House. The organization was rebranded as Hockey Wales in 2011. Hockey Wales is based in Sport Wales National Centre, Sophia Gardens, in Cardiff.

== Functions ==
Hockey Wales is the official national governing body of men's and women's hockey in Wales. It is responsible for the administration of all aspects of the game in Wales, including clubs, competitions, internationals, and umpiring. It organizes national competitions including men's and women's Welsh Cups. It is also responsible for the development of Hockey in schools and universities, and conducts hockey championships for various age groups.

== International participation ==
Welsh hockey team in 1911

Internationally, Welsh players compete at the Olympic games as part of the Great Britain team. Wales fielded a standalone team for the field hockey event at the 1908 Summer Olympics in London. Competing amongst six teams including four from Great Britain, the team won a bronze medal. Since the 1920 Summer Olympics, Wales competes as a part of Great Britain. The Great Britain team has made over 20 appearances in the Summer Olympics, and has won 13 medals including four gold and two silver medals. The team won its last gold medal in the 2016 Summer Olympics, and a bronze in the 2020 Summer Olympics.

In all other competitions, including the Hockey World Cup, the Commonwealth Games and the EuroHockey Championships, Wales' national women's team and men's team compete in their own right. Both the men's and women's teams first appeared at the 1998 Commonwealth Games, where field hockey made its debut. Since then, both the teams had competed in five Commonwealth Games. The men's and women's teams recorded their best place finishes of sixth and eighth respectively in the last Commonwealth Games in 2022.

The men's team qualified for its first ever Hockey World Cup in 2023, in which they finished last in the group stage after losing all the three matches played. However, Wales beat France on penalties to secure 11th place in the tournament. In the EuroHockey Nations Challenge, the men's team has appeared in the top tier Men's EuroHockey Championship eleven times, and in the second tier Men's EuroHockey Championship II six times. The team has won a silver and two bronze at the Championship II events. In the women's event, the team has appeared in the top tier Women's EuroHockey Championship three times, and in the second tier championship eight times. The team has won two bronze in the Championship II events.
