= Tim Whiteman =

English field hockey player

Personal information
- Born: 2 April 1987 (age 39) Suffolk, England

Sport
- Sport: Field hockey
- Position: Defender/midfielder
Senior career
Years	Team	Caps	Goals
2003	Harleston Magpies	-	-
2009–2017	Beeston	-	-
2017–2019	Harleston Magpies	-	-
National team
Years	Team	Caps	Goals
–	England & GB	54	-
Medal record
Representing England
World League
Bronze medal – third place	2014 New Delhi	Team

Timothy Whiteman (born 2 April 1987) is an English retired international field hockey player who played as a defender/midfielder for England and Great Britain.

== Biography ==
Whiteman began his hockey career at Harleston Magpies but gave up hockey while he taught and travelled in India. He returned to play club hockey in the Men's England Hockey League for Beeston and won three league titles with the club.

Whiteman made his England debut in 2014 and participated in the 2014 Men's Hockey World Cup but missed the 2014 Commonwealth Games due to a broken thumb injury sustained during the World Cup.

For the 2017/18 season, Whiteman joined Harleston Magpies as a player/coach for the men's first team.

While playing at the end of the 2019 season he suffered a blow to his left eye, which caused a brain injury and required a six months recovery period before returning to his job as a politics and history teacher, formerly at Thorpe St Andrew School.
