= Jolyon Morgan =

Welsh field hockey player

Personal information
- Born: 9 March 1999 (age 27)

Sport
- Sport: Field hockey
- Position: Forward
Senior career
| Years | Team | Caps | Goals |
| 2020–2021 | Nijmegen | - | - |
| 2021–2022 | Cardiff & Met | - | - |
| 2022–2026 | Hampstead & Westminster | - | - |
National team
| Years | Team | Caps | Goals |
| 2018– | Wales | 52 | - |
Medal record
Representing Wales
European Championship II
| Gold medal – first place | 2025 Lousada | Team |

Jolyon Morgan (born 9 March 1999) is a Welsh field hockey player who has represented Wales. In 2025, he won a gold medal at the European Championship II.

== Biography ==
Morgan was educated at Bishop of Llandaff Church in Wales High School and studied Sports and Exercise at University of Birmingham from 2017 to 2020. He made his Welsh debut in 2018 and participated in both the 2021 Men's EuroHockey Championship and the 2023 Men's EuroHockey Championship. After University, Morgan spent a year in the Dutch leagues playing for NMHC Nijmegen from 2020 to 2021. He then played club hockey for Cardiff & Met before joining Hampstead & Westminster Hockey Club in the Men's England Hockey League for the 2022/23 season.

Morgan plays as a forward and scored a hat-tricks against Malaysia and Japan at the 2024–25 Men's FIH Hockey Nations Cup.

In 2025, he helped Wales win the gold medal at the European Championship II, defeating Ireland in the final and earning his 50th cap during the tournament.
