= Fred Newbold =

Welsh field hockey player

Personal information
- Born: 29 March 2001 (age 25) Reading

Sport
- Sport: Field hockey
- Position: Midfield
Senior career
Years	Team	Caps	Goals
2019–2023	Reading	-	-
2023–2024	Alster	-	-
2024–2025	Wimbledon	-	-
2025–2026	Hurley	-	-
National team
Years	Team	Caps	Goals
2021–	Wales	38	(11)
Medal record
Representing Wales
European Championship II
Gold medal – first place	2025 Lousada	Team

Fred Newbold (born 29 March 2001) is a Welsh field hockey player who has represented Wales. In 2025, he won a gold medal at the European Championship II.

== Biography ==
Newbold was educated at Reading School and studied Biological Sciences at The Queen's College, Oxford. He represented the England U16 before switching allegiance and playing for the Welsh U21s. He won bronze at the Sultan of Johor Cup with the GB U21s, captaining the side in a game against Malaysia. At the University of Oxford he earned his four Oxford blues in the 2020, 2021, 2022 and 2023 varsity matches.

He played club hockey for Reading Hockey Club in the Men's England Hockey League and made his Welsh debut in May 2021.

Newbold was part of the Welsh team at the 2023 World Cup, which was the first time in their history that Wales had appeared in the world Cup. Additionally he was part of the Welsh team that played at the 2021 Men's EuroHockey Championship and 2023 Men's EuroHockey Championship.

Newbold spent a year playing in the German leagues for Der Club an der Alster and on his return signed for Wimbledon Hockey Club and was also added to the Great Britain Hockey centralised programme in 2024. He now represents THC Hurley in the Dutch Hoofdklasse.

In 2025, he helped Wales win the gold medal at the European Championship II, defeating Ireland in the final.

He joined the Dutch team THC Hurley for the 2025–26 season.
