= Gareth Furlong =

Welsh field hockey player

Personal information
- Full name: Gareth Robert Furlong
- Born: 10 May 1992 (age 34) Cambridge, England

Sport
- Sport: Field hockey
- Position: Defender
Senior career
Years	Team	Caps	Goals
?-2009	Cambridge Nomads	-	-
2009-2011	Harleston Magpies	-	-
2011-2014	Sheffield	-	-
2014–2018	Surbiton	-	-
2018–2019	HC Tilburg	-	-
2019–2020	Cardiff & Met	-	-
2020–2021	HC Tilburg	-	-
2021–Present	Surbiton	-	-
2024–Present	Delhi SG Pipers	-	-
National team
Years	Team	Caps	Goals
2010-Present	Wales	172	(117)
2024-Present	GB	17	(7)
Medal record
Men's field hockey
Representing Wales
European Championship II
Gold medal – first place	2025 Lousada	Team

Gareth Robert Furlong (born 10 May 1992) is a Welsh field hockey player, who competed at the 2024 Summer Olympics. His brother is Rhodri Furlong.

== Biography ==
Furlong, born in Cambridge, began playing club hockey for Cambridge Nomads before joining Harleston Magpies. He made his Welsh senior debut against the United States in 2010

He studied Sport Science at Sheffield Hallam University and duly played for Sheffield Hallam HC and was called up to represent Wales in the 2014 Commonwealth Games in Glasgow.

He later played for Surbiton Hockey Club, where he won the league title in both the 17/18 and 18/19 seasons and was selected to represent Wales at the 2018 Commonwealth Games in Gold Coast. Furlong then moved to the Netherlands to play for HC Tilburg which was split for one season with Cardiff & Met, while he completed a masters degree.

He represented Great Britain at the 2024 Summer Olympics. The team went out in the quarter-finals after losing a penalty shootout to India.

After returning to play for Surbiton, Furlong was part of the team that won the league title during the 2024–25 Men's England Hockey League season.

In 2025, he helped Wales win the gold medal at the European Championship II, defeating Ireland in the final.
