= Gareth Griffiths (field hockey) =

Welsh field hockey player

Personal information
- Born: 13 March 1999 (age 27)

Sport
- Sport: Field hockey
- Position: Midfield
Senior career
Years	Team	Caps	Goals
2004–2026	Beeston	-	-
National team
Years	Team	Caps	Goals
2022–	Wales	45	-
Medal record
Representing Wales
European Championship II
Gold medal – first place	2025 Lousada	Team

Gareth Griffiths (born 13 March 1999) is a Welsh field hockey player who has represented Wales. He competed for Wales at the 2022 Commonwealth Games.

== Biography ==
Griffiths was educated at The Long Eaton School and Nottingham Trent University.

Griffiths joined Beeston Hockey Club as a child and worked through the junior teams before making his senior debut in the Men's England Hockey League aged just 15. He became the club captain aged 22. He played for Great Britain at U21 and U23 level and won medals at the Sultan of Johor Cup.

He made his Welsh debut in June 2022 and was selected to represent Wales at the 2022 Commonwealth Games in Birmingham, helping his nation to a sixth-place finish during the men's tournament after being defeated by New Zealand in the fifth place play off match on 7 August 2022.

He was part of the Welsh team at the 2023 World Cup, which was the first time in their history that Wales had appeared in the world Cup. Additionally he was part of the Welsh team that played at the 2023 Men's EuroHockey Championship.

In 2025, he helped Wales win the gold medal at the European Championship II, defeating Ireland in the final.
