= Wales men's national field hockey team =

Wales
- Association: Hockey Wales
- Confederation: European Hockey Federation
- Head Coach: Daniel Newcombe
- Assistant coach(es): Luke Hawker; Martin Schouten
- Manager: Gwyn Williams
- Captain: Ben Francis
Home	Away

FIH ranking
- Current: 15 ▲1 (5 August 2026)

Olympic Games
- Appearances: 1 (first in 1908)
- Best result: (bronze) 3rd (1908)

World Cup
- Appearances: 2 (first in 2023)
- Best result: 11th (2023)

EuroHockey Championship
- Appearances: 10 (first in 1970)
- Best result: 6th (1978, 1999, 2019)

The Wales men's national field hockey team represents Wales in men's international field hockey competitions.

Wales participated once in the Summer Olympics, the first edition and they won the bronze medal. Since then they participate in the Olympics as a part of the Great Britain squad. In 2021, they qualified for their first ever World Cup in 2023.

== Tournament history ==
=== Summer Olympics ===
Welsh Hockey Team vs Scotland, 1911.

- 1908 – (bronze)

=== World Cup ===
- 2023 – 11th place
- 2026 – 15th place

=== Commonwealth Games ===
- 1998 – 9th place
- 2002 – 7th place
- 2014 – 9th place
- 2018 – 9th place
- 2022 – 6th place

=== EuroHockey Championship ===
- 1970 – 12th place
- 1974 – 8th place
- 1978 – 6th place
- 1983 – 12th place
- 1987 – 12th place
- 1991 – 10th place
- 1995 – 7th place
- 1999 – 6th place
- 2019 – 6th place
- 2021 – 7th place
- 2023 – 8th place

=== Hockey World League ===
- 2012–13 – Did not rank
- 2014–15 – Did not rank
- 2016–17 – 24th place

=== Nations Cup ===
- 2024–25 – 5th place

=== EuroHockey Championship II ===
- 2005 – (bronze)
- 2007 – 5th place
- 2009 – (bronze)
- 2011 – 6th place
- 2013 – 7th place
- 2017 – (silver)
- 2025 – (gold)

=== EuroHockey Championship III ===
- 2015 – (gold)

== Players ==
=== Current squad ===
Roster for the 2026 Men's FIH Hockey World Cup.

Head coach: Danny Newcombe

3. Daniel Kyriakides
5. Alf Dinnie
6. Jacob Draper (C)
7. Gareth Griffiths
10. Rhodri Furlong
13. Dale Hutchinson
15. Rhys Bradshaw
16. Sam Welsh
17. Fred Newbold
18. Gareth Furlong
20. Jolyon Morgan
23. Jack Pritchard
24. Hywel Jones
25. Benjamin Francis (C)
29. Jonathan Fleck
30. James Tyson
31. Liam Barker
33. Rhys Payne (GK)
44. Nicholas Morgan
50. Toby Reynolds-Cotterill (GK)

== Results and fixtures ==
The following is a list of match results in the last 12 months, as well as any future matches that have been scheduled.

Win Draw Loss Fixture

=== 2026 ===
01 March 2026 WC Qualifiers GS	Wales	2–2	Chile	Santiago, Chile
19:45	Morgan 4'; Furlong 47'	Report	R.Valenzuela 22'; A.Valenzuela 23'	Stadium: Estadio Nacional del Hockey Césped Claudia Schüler

03 March 2026 WC Qualifiers GS	Wales	0–5	France	Santiago, Chile
18:00		Report	Charlet 20', 41', 50'; Marqué 37', 51'	Stadium: Estadio Nacional del Hockey Césped Claudia Schüler

04 March 2026 WC Qualifiers GS	Scotland	0–5	Wales	Santiago, Chile
18:00		Report	Pritchard 4'; Newbold 10', 38'; Hutchinson 28'; Welsh 43'	Stadium: Estadio Nacional del Hockey Césped Claudia Schüler

06 March 2026 WC Qualifiers SF	Ireland	4–0	Wales	Santiago, Chile
19:30	Lynch 1', 44'; Rowe 26'; Nelson 44'	Report		Stadium: Estadio Nacional del Hockey Césped Claudia Schüler

08 March 2026 WC Qualifiers Third and fourth place	Poland	1–2	Wales	Santiago, Chile
13:30	Koperski 51'	Report	G. Furlong 22', 27'	Stadium: Estadio Nacional del Hockey Césped Claudia Schüler

16 July 2026 Friendly match 1	Spain	8–0	Wales	Terrassa, Spain
11:00				Stadium: Estadi Martí Colomer

17 July 2026 Friendly match 2	Spain	9–2	Wales	Terrassa, Spain
11:00				Stadium: Estadi Martí Colomer

26 July 2026 Test 1	Wales	5–1	Chile	Cardiff, Wales
13:15	Furlong 8', 43'; Pritchard 8', 42'; Morgan 41'	Report	Amoroso 2'	Stadium: The National Hockey Centre, Sophia Gardens

28 July 2026 Test 2	Wales	5–1	Chile	Cardiff, Wales
17:30	Furlong 1', 22', 60'; Barker 3'; Bradshaw 11'	Report	Acevedo 58'	Stadium: The National Hockey Centre, Sophia Gardens

29 July 2026 Test 3	Wales	1–0	Chile	Cardiff, Wales
17:30	Tyson 50'	Report		Stadium: The National Hockey Centre, Sophia Gardens

15 August 2026 World Cup Pool D	India	3–1	Wales	Amstelveen, Netherlands
12:00	Sanjay 8'; Harmanpreet 11', 43'	Report	Welsh 56'	Stadium: Wagener Stadium

17 August 2026 World Cup Pool D	Pakistan	3–3	Wales	Amstelveen, Netherlands
11:30	Abdul 3'; Khan 49'; Shahid 51'	Report	Furlong 25', 53'; Bradshaw 26'	Stadium: Wagener Stadium

19 August 2026 World Cup Pool D	England	8–2	Wales	Amstelveen, Netherlands
11:30	Ward 2'; Calnan 13', 20'; Sorsby 22'; Wallace 41'; Hooper 48'; Croft 51'; Bandurak 54'	Report	G. Furlong 58', 59'	Stadium: Wagener Stadium

22 August 2026 World Cup Pool G	New Zealand	7–2	Wales	Amstelveen, Netherlands
10:00	Hickson 22', 25', 56'; Boyde 32'; Russell 35'; Ward 41'; Lane 48'	Report	Morgan 8', 23'	Stadium: Wagener Stadium

24 August 2026 World Cup Pool G	Japan	3–2	Wales	Amstelveen, Netherlands
09:30	S. Yamada 15'; Kawabe 28'; Matsumoto 60'	Report	Draper 49'; Welsh 60'	Stadium: Wagener Stadium

28 August 2026 World Cup 15th place match	Wales	2–2 (2–1 p)	Malaysia	Wavre, Belgium
11:00	Francis 29'; Barker 53'	Report	Fa. Saari 41'; Anuar 52'	Stadium: Belfius Hockey Arena
	Penalties
	J. Morgan (penalty shoot-out scored); Welsh (penalty shoot-out missed); Newbold (penalty shoot-out missed); Pritchard (penalty shoot-out scored)		(penalty shoot-out missed) Rozemi; (penalty shoot-out missed) Fa. Saari; (penalty shoot-out scored) Fi. Saari; (penalty shoot-out missed) Azrai; (penalty shoot-out missed) Silverius

== See also ==
- Great Britain men's national field hockey team
- Wales women's national field hockey team
