= Jack Pritchard (field hockey) =

Welsh field hockey player

Personal information
- Born: 14 August 1993 (age 33) Exeter, Devon, England

Sport
- Sport: Field hockey
- Position: Forward
Senior career
Years	Team	Caps	Goals
2011–2026	Cardiff & Met	-	-
National team
Years	Team	Caps	Goals
2021–	Wales	39	-
Medal record
Representing Wales
European Championship II
Gold medal – first place	2025 Lousada	Team

Jack David Pritchard (born 14 August 1993) is a Welsh field hockey player who has represented Wales. In 2025, he won a gold medal at the European Championship II.

== Biography ==
Pritchard studied at Cardiff Metropolitan University and in 2011, joined and played club hockey for Cardiff & Met Hockey Club in the Men's England Hockey League. He made his Welsh debut against Malaysia in October 2021. He plays as a forward.

Pritchard was also part of the Welsh team that qualified for the 2023 World Cup, which was the first time in their history that Wales had appeared in the world Cup. Additionally he was part of the Welsh team that played at the 2023 Men's EuroHockey Championship.

In 2025, he helped Wales win the gold medal at the European Championship II, defeating Ireland in the final.

Pritchard became captain of Cardiff & Met and works for the Glamorgan County Cricket Club as a Finance Officer.
