= Beeston Hockey Club =

English field hockey club founded 1907

- Founded: 1907
- League: Men's England Hockey League; Women's England Hockey League; Midlands League
- Based in: Beeston, Nottinghamshire, England
- Arena: Nottingham Hockey Centre
- Colours: Black, gold (home) and white, black (away)

Beeston Hockey Club is a field hockey club based in Beeston, England. The club was founded in 1907, and plays its home games at the Nottingham Hockey Centre in Nottingham. Beeston is nicknamed the Bees.

The men's 1st XI plays in the Men's England Hockey League and the ladies 1st XI in the Women's England Hockey League. The majority of the other teams compete in the Midlands League. The large club fields six men's sides, seven ladies sides and various junior sides. The men's team have been champions of England on three occasions (2010–11, 2012–13, 2013–14)

== History ==
The men's 1st XI won its first major trophy in 2008, defeating Bowdon 4–3 in the Men's National Cup. The men's team won its first National League Premier Division title in 2010/11, and went on to win it again in 2012/13 and 2013/14. The men's 1st XI have also competed in the Euro Hockey League. Beeston HC twinned with HC Rotterdam on 1 February 2017.

In 2020, Beeston secured an historic cup double by becoming the first club to win both the men's cup and women's cup competitions in the same season. On 5 September the women's team won their COVID-19 delayed final beating the defending champions Clifton Robinsons 3–2 in the final. At the same time the men won their delayed semi final on penalties and one week later on 12 September defeated Fareham 9–1 in the final. The women's first team won the 2022 England Hockey Women's Championship Cup.

The club recorded a second Championship cup double during the 2023-2024 season, with the men's team winning the 2024 men's cup and the women's team winning a third consecutive 2024 women's cup.

== Players ==
=== Men's First Team Squad 2025–26 season ===
- 1. Simon Hujwan (goalkeeper)
- 3. Oliver Dunn
- 5. Alasdair Richmond
- 6. Archie Vaughan
- 7. Gareth Griffiths (captain)
- 8. Ben Collinson
- 9. Oliver Ashdown
- 10. George Fletcher
- 12. Brendan Andrews
- 13. Connor Webb
- 14. Joseph Paul
- 15. William Prentice
- 16. Sahib Dhillon
- 17. Christopher Curry
- 18. Josh Webb
- 19. Oliver Manson
- 24. Nathan Rozario
- 25. David Loy
- x. Ben Kendall

== Men's Team Honours ==
- 2010–11 Men's League Champions
- 2012–13 Men's League Champions
- 2013–14 Men's League Champions
- 2007–08 Men's Cup Winners
- 2009–10 Men's Cup Winners
- 2010–11 Men's Cup Winners
- 2011–12 Men's Cup Winners
- 2015–16 Men's Cup Winners
- 2019–20 Men's Cup Winners
- 2023–24 Men's Cup Winners

== Women's Team Honours ==
- 2019–20 Women's Cup Winners
- 2021–22 Women's Cup Winners
- 2022–23 Women's Cup Winners
- 2023–24 Women's Cup Winners

== Notable players ==
=== Men's internationals ===
Extended content

Player	Events	Notes/Ref
(England) James Albery	2015–2019	
(England) / (Republic of Ireland) David Ames	Oly (2016)	
(England) Ben Arnold	CT (2012)	
(Australia) Craig Boyne		
(Scotland) Jamie Cachia	2014–2022	
(Wales) Ollie Cooper	2005–2006	
(England) Adam Dixon	Oly (2016, 2020), CG (2010, 2014, 2018), WC (2014, 2018), WC (2010), CT (2009,10,11,12,14,16)	
(England) Simon Egerton	CT (2012)	
(England) James Gall	2014–2015	
(England) / (Republic of Ireland) Mark Gleghorne	Oly (2016), CG (2018), WC (2018), CT (2016)	
(Wales) David Griffiths	2006	
(Wales) Gareth Griffiths	CG (2022), EC (2025)	
(Scotland) Gareth Hall	CG (2014)	
(England) Michael Hoare	CT (2012)	
(England) Martin Jones	2009–2017	
(Wales) Zak Jones	2006	
(Scotland) James McBlane		
(Scotland) Gordon McIntyre	CG (2014)	
(England) Harry Martin	Oly (2016), CG (2014), WC (2014)	
(Pakistan) Muhammad Nadeem	2005	
(England) George Pinner	CG (2014), WC (2014)	
(Scotland) Alasdair Richmond	Ec (2025)	
(Wales) Ben Rogers	2006	
(Austria) Patrick Schmidt	2011-2012	
(Wales) Matt Simkin	2006	
(England) Tom Sorsby	2015-2017	
(England) Samuel Ward	CG (2018)	
(England) Tim Whiteman	WC (2014)	
(England) Ollie Willars	CG (2014, 2018)	
(England) Alastair Wilson	Oly (2008, 2012), CG (2010), WC (2010)	

Key

- Oly = Olympic Games
- CG = Commonwealth Games
- WC = World Cup
- CT = Champions Trophy
- EC = European Championships

=== Women's internationals ===
Extended content

Player	Events	Notes/Ref
(Scotland) Nicki Cochrane		
(Wales) Caro Hulme		
(England) Jo Hunter		
(Republic of Ireland) Jane Kilpatrick		
(England) Kathryn Lane		
(England) Shona McCallin		
(England) Suzy Petty		
(Wales) Sophie Robinson		
(England) Erica Sanders		
(Scotland) Charlotte Watson		
(England) Ellie Watton		
(England) Hollie Webb		
(Wales) Jules Whiting		

Key

- Oly = Olympic Games
- CG = Commonwealth Games
- WC = World Cup
- CT = Champions Trophy
- EC = European Championships
