= Nicholas Morgan (field hockey) =

Welsh field hockey player

Nic Morgan
Personal information
- Born: 5 January 2002 (age 24)

Sport
- Sport: Field hockey
- Position: Defender
Senior career
Years	Team	Caps	Goals
2018–2021	Swansea	-	-
2022–2025	Cardiff & Met	-	-
2025–2026	Surbiton	-	-
National team
Years	Team	Caps	Goals
2024–	Wales	11	-
Medal record
Representing Wales
European Championship II
Gold medal – first place	2025 Lousada	Team

Nicholas Morgan (born 5 January 2002) is a Welsh field hockey player who has represented Wales. In 2025, he won a gold medal at the European Championship II.

== Biography ==
Morgan was educated at Ysgol Gyfun Gŵyr, where he represented the Welsh U18 team. He earned junior international honours at Swansea Hockey Club. In April 2025, Morgan was named in the Great Britain development squad

He made his Welsh debut against Austria on 8 August 2024. while playing club hockey for Cardiff & Met. He signed for the defending league champions Surbiton Hockey Club in the Men's England Hockey League for the 2025–26 season.

In 2025, he helped Wales win the gold medal at the European Championship II, defeating Ireland in the final. He scored a vital equaliser against Scotland in the group matches.
