= Louis Rowe (field hockey) =

Irish field hockey player

Personal information
- Born: 28 June 2004 (age 22) Ireland

Sport
- Sport: Field hockey
- Position: Forward
- Club: Banbridge
National team
Years	Team	Caps	Goals
2022–	Ireland U–21	10	(4)
2023–	Ireland	21	(4)
Medal record
Men's field hockey
Representing Ireland
EuroHockey U–21 Championship II
Gold medal – first place	2022 Plzeň Litice

Louis Rowe (born 28 June 2004) is an international field hockey player from Ireland.

== Field hockey ==
=== Domestic league ===
Rowe currently competes in the Irish Hockey League, where he plays for Banbridge Hockey Club. He has also represented the side in the Euro Hockey League, the top club competition hosted by the European Hockey Federation.

=== Under–21 ===
Since 2022, Rowe has been a member of the Ireland U–21 squad. He made his first appearances for the team during the 2022 EuroHockey U–21 Championship II in Plzeň Litice. At the tournament he won a gold medal, helping Ireland gain promotion to the EuroHockey U–21 Championship.

Following their promotion in 2022, Rowe went on to represent the national junior team at the 2024 EuroHockey U–21 Championship in Terrassa.

=== Senior national team ===
Rowe made his senior international debut for Ireland in 2023. He earned his first senior international cap during a test match against Wales in Royal Hillsborough.

Since his senior debut, Rowe has represented the national team sporadically. He has appeared in seasons five and six of the FIH Pro League, as well as the 2025 EuroHockey Championship Qualifiers in Dublin, and in multiple test series'. He has also been named to represent the national team at the 2025 EuroHockey Championship II in Lousada.

== International goals ==
The following table lists all goals scored by Rowe at international level.

Goal	Date	Location	Opponent	Score	Result	Event	Ref
1	22 August 2024	National Sports Campus, Dublin, Ireland	Malta	17–0	25–0	2025 EuroHockey Championship Qualifiers	
2	25 August 2024	National Sports Campus, Dublin, Ireland	Czechia	4–0	4–0	2025 EuroHockey Championship Qualifiers	
3	14 June 2025	Wilrijkse Plein, Antwerp, Belgium	Belgium	1–3	1–5	2024–25 Men's FIH Pro League	
4	15 June 2025	Wilrijkse Plein, Antwerp, Belgium	Belgium	1–0	3–2	2024–25 Men's FIH Pro League	
