= University of Exeter Hockey Club =

Field hockey club in Exeter, England

- Full name: University of Exeter Hockey Club
- League: Men's England Hockey League; Women's England Hockey League; West Hockey League; British Universities & Colleges Sport; Verde Recreo Hockey League
- Founded: 1920
- Colors: White and green
- Home ground: The Nandos, Streatham Campus; University of Exeter
- Website: https://www.exeteruniversityhockeyclub.com/

The University of Exeter Hockey Club is a field hockey club based in Exeter, Devon, England.

The club plays its matches at the Sports Park on the University of Exeter's Streatham Campus. There is a water based pitch and a hybrid pitch.

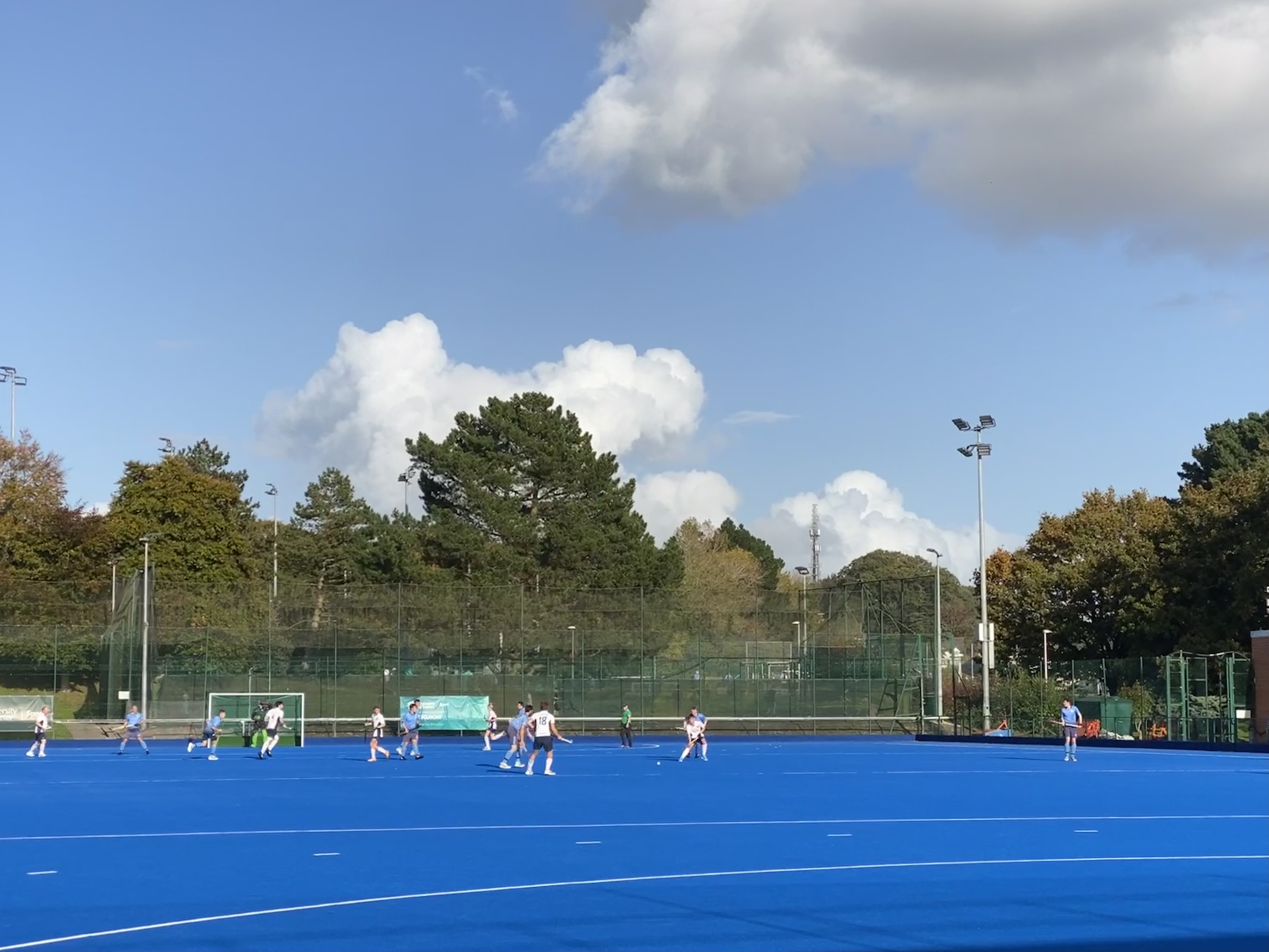
Streatham Campus hockey pitch in 2024

== Teams ==
The Men's 1st XI play in the Men's England Hockey League and the women's 1st XI play in the Women's England Hockey League. The club fields other teams that compete in the BUCS league on Wednesdays and in the West Hockey League at the weekend. A seventh XI was formed in 2014, serving as a Development XI for those working towards a berth in one of the six regular outfits, which now also participates in the local weekend league and in BUCS. In 2025, an eighth XI was set up to serve as a new development squad, and a feeder team into the main club.

EUMHC work in the community providing coaches to the England Hockey Junior Development Centres (JDC) and Junior Academy Centres (JAC). Furthermore, the club supports a twenty team intramural hockey competition. In all, just over 450 students play hockey at the University of Exeter on a weekly basis.

A committee, elected annually by the members, organises the club's affairs and works in conjunction with the university sport department, Athletic Union and other agencies involved in the provision of sport within the higher education sphere. The current Club Captain is Will Rouget. Harry Jones serves as 1st XI coach and Head of Hockey.

== Notable players ==
=== Men's internationals ===
Extended content

Player	Events/Notes	Ref
(Wales) Rhys Bradshaw	CG (2022)	
(England) James Carleton	EC (2025)	
(Scotland) Ben Galloway	Nations Cup 2025	
(Wales) Peter Swainson	2002-2006	
(England) Sam Taylor	2022	

Key

- Oly = Olympic Games
- CG = Commonwealth Games
- WC = World Cup
- CT = Champions Trophy
- EC = European Championships

The following players went on to win international caps:

- Nicoló Anserini (Italy)
- Nick Brothers (England and Great Britain)
- James Carson (Wales)
- Tom Carson (England and Great Britain)
- Ben Edge (Wales)
- Ben Fox (England)
- Ben Francis (Wales)
- Ian Haley (South Africa)
- Mark Lewis (Wales and Great Britain)
- Rufus McNaught-Barrington (Wales)
- Simon Mantell (England and Great Britain)
- Nick Page (England Indoor)
- Veryan Pappin (Scotland and Great Britain)
- Ollie Payne (England and Great Britain)
- Jake Payton (England)
- Chris Rea (USA)
- Duncan Scott (England and Great Britain)
- Jimmy Wallis (England and Great Britain)

== Charity work ==
The club has raised money for Movember, an annual event involving the growing of moustaches during the month of November to raise awareness of men's health issues; Mind, a mental health charity; and Help for Heroes.
