= Victor Charlet =

French field hockey player

Personal information
- Full name: Victor Charlet
- Born: 19 November 1993 (age 32)
- Height: 196 cm (6 ft 5 in)
- Weight: 95 kg (209 lb)

Sport
- Sport: Field hockey
- Position: Defender
Senior career
Years	Team	Caps	Goals
–	Waterloo Ducks	-	-
2024–present	Team Gonasika	-	-
National team
Years	Team	Caps	Goals
2012–2013	France U–21	20	(5)
2014–present	France	116	(55)
Medal record
Men's field hockey
Representing France
FIH Hockey Series
Gold medal – first place	2018–19 Le Touqet	Team
FIH Junior World Cup
Silver medal – second place	2013 New Delhi	Team

Victor Charlet (born 19 November 1993) is a French field hockey player who plays as a defender for French club [polo hockey club] and the French national team.

== Career ==
=== Club hockey ===
At club level, Charlet plays for the Waterloo Ducks in the Belgian Hockey League. In March 2020, Charlet extended his contract with the club until 2024.

=== International hockey ===
==== Under–21 ====
In 2013, Charlet was a member of the French U–21 side at the FIH Junior World Cup, where he won a silver medal. He played a total of 20 U-21 games for France, scoring five goals.

==== Senior national team ====
Charlet made his debut for the France senior team in 2014. He is the current captain of the national team. In 2018, he led the team at the FIH World Cup.
