= Nick Bandurak =

England field hockey player (born 1992)

Personal information
- Born: 14 December 1992 (age 33) Wolverhampton, England
- Height: 1.83 m (6 ft 0 in)

Sport
- Sport: Field hockey
- Position: Forward
Senior career
Years	Team	Caps	Goals
–2011	Cannock	-	-
2011–2015	University of Birmingham	-	-
2015–2024	Holcombe	-	-
2024–2025	East Grinstead	-	-
2025–2026	Surbiton	-	-
National team
Years	Team	Caps	Goals
2013–2013	England U21	5	(2)
2022–present	England & GB	14	(10)
Medal record
Men's field hockey
Representing England
EuroHockey Championship
Silver medal – second place	2023 Mönchengladbach
Commonwealth Games
Bronze medal – third place	2022 Birmingham	Team

Nicholas Kimon Bandurak (born 14 December 1992) is an English field hockey player who plays as a forward for Surbiton Hockey Club and the England and Great Britain national teams.

== Biography ==
Bandurak played club hockey in the Men's England Hockey League for Cannock until 2011. He then began studying at the University of Birmingham and subsequently began playing for the University of Birmingham. Upon graduating in 2015, Bandurak joined Premier Division club Holcombe. While at Cannock, Bandurak made his England U21 debut when he played in the Hero Hockey Junior World Cup Men 2013 in India.

Bandurak made his senior England debut versus Spain, in the FIH Pro League on 4 February 2022 and won a bronze medal with England in the Men's tournament at the 2022 Commonwealth Games in Birmingham and participated in the 2023 Men's FIH Hockey World Cup.

He won a silver medal with England at the 2023 Men's EuroHockey Championship in Mönchengladbach.

After knee surgery and internal disagreements at Holcombe, Bandurak signed for East Grinstead for the 2024–25 season but only managed 2 appearances. He subsequently joined defending champions Surbiton for the 2025–26 season and their 25/26 EHL campaign. After scoring 18 goals in phase one of the 25/26 season, Bandurak was recalled to the England squad for the first time in 2 years for FIH pro-league Dublin and scored on his return despite a 4-1 loss to Germany.
