= Lee Cole (field hockey) =

Irish field hockey player (born 1995)

Personal information
- Born: 21 February 1995 (age 31) Ireland
- Height: 183 cm (6 ft 0 in)

Sport
- Sport: Field hockey
- Position: Defence
Senior career
Years	Team	Caps	Goals
–	Monkstown	-	-
National team
Years	Team	Caps	Goals
2014	Ireland U–21	8	(4)
2015–	Ireland	109	(29)
Medal record
Men's field hockey
Representing Ireland
FIH Hockey Series
Silver medal – second place	2018–19 Le Touquet	Team
EuroHockey Championship II
Gold medal – first place	2023 Dublin	Team

Lee Cole (born 21 February 1995) is a field hockey player from Ireland.

== Life ==
Cole was born on 21 February 1995.

== Field hockey ==
=== Domestic league ===
In the all-island Irish Hockey League, Cole represents Monkstown Hockey Club.

=== Under–21 ===
Cole made his debut for the Irish U–21 team in 2014 during a four-nations tournament in Dublin. He represented the team again that year, competing at the EuroHockey Junior Championship II in Lousada.

=== Senior national team ===
Cole made his senior international debut in 2015. He appeared in a test series against France in Dublin.

Since his debut, Cole has been present at numerous international events. He has medalled twice with the national team, taking home gold at the 2023 edition of the EuroHockey Championship II, and silver at the 2018–19 FIH Series Finals in Le Touquet.

In 2018 he was a member of the Irish squad at the FIH World Cup held in Bhubaneswar.

He competed at the 2024 FIH Olympic Qualifiers in Valencia.

== Cricket ==
Cole has also represented Ireland internationally in cricket.
