= 2023 Men's FIH Hockey World Cup =

Field hockey world championships in India

Tournament details
- Host country: India
- Cities: Bhubaneswar; Rourkela
- Dates: 13–29 January
- Teams: 16 (from 5 confederations)
- Venue(s): Kalinga Stadium; Birsa Munda International Hockey Stadium

Final positions
- Champions: Germany (3rd title)
- Runner-up: Belgium
- Third place: Netherlands

Tournament statistics
- Matches played: 44
- Goals scored: 249 (5.66 per match)
- Top scorer: (Australia) Jeremy Hayward (9 goals)
- Best player: (Germany) Niklas Wellen
- Best young player: (South Africa) Mustapha Cassiem
- Best goalkeeper: (Belgium) Vincent Vanasch

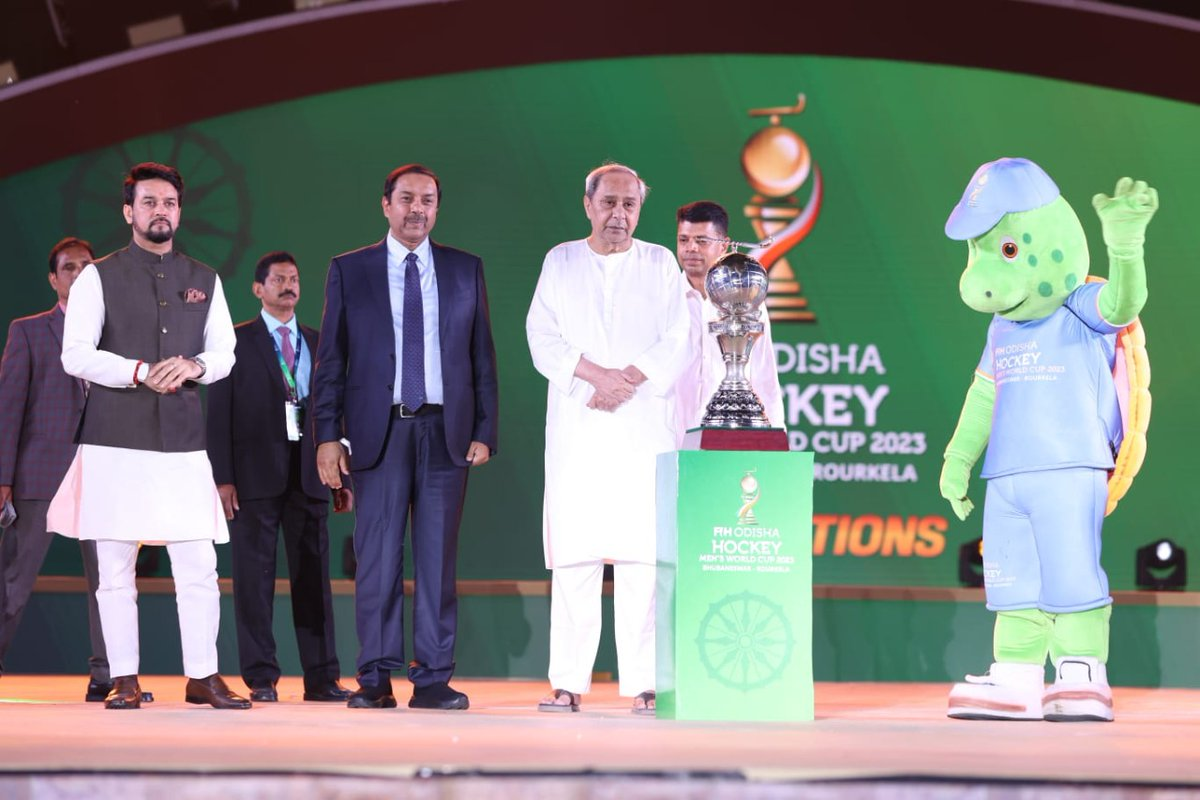
Sports Minister Anurag Thakur, FIH President Tayyab Ikram and Chief Minister Naveen Patnaik with mascot Olly at the opening ceremony.

The 2023 Men's FIH Hockey World Cup was the 15th edition of the Men's FIH Hockey World Cup, the quadrennial world championship for men's national field hockey teams organized by the International Hockey Federation. It was held at the Kalinga Hockey Stadium in Bhubaneswar and at the 20,000 seat Birsa Munda International Hockey Stadium in Rourkela, India from 13 to 29 January 2023.

Germany won their third title after defeating the defending champions Belgium in the final 5–4 in a shoot-out after the match finished 3–3 in regular time. The Netherlands captured the bronze medal by winning 3–1 against Australia.

== Host selection ==
The International Hockey Federation announced in December 2018 that the 2022 Hockey World Cups would be held either in July 2022 or January 2023. The FIH received the following final three bids for the Men's 2022 World Cup. In November 2019, India was confirmed to host the tournament in January 2023.

For the preferred time window 1–17 July 2022:

- Belgium
- Germany (withdrew)
- Malaysia
- Spain (withdrew)

For the preferred time window 13–29 January 2023:

- India

== Teams ==
=== Qualification ===
Just as in 2018, 16 teams competed in the tournament. Alongside hosts, India, the five continental champions received an automatic berth. After the postponement of the 2020 Summer Olympics the quota of places available through continental championships including the World Cup hosts was increased from six to sixteen.

Dates	Event	Location	Quotas	Qualifier(s)
8 November 2019	Hosts	—N/a	1	India (6)
4–13 June 2021	2021 EuroHockey Championship	Amstelveen, Netherlands	5	Belgium (2); England (5); Germany (4); Netherlands (3); Spain (8)
21–24 October 2021	2021 European Qualifier	Cardiff, Wales	2	France (12); Wales (15) (Debut)
17–23 January 2022	2022 Africa Cup of Nations	Accra, Ghana	1	South Africa (14)
20–30 January 2022	2022 Pan American Cup	Santiago, Chile	2	Argentina (7); Chile (22) (Debut)
23 May – 1 June 2022	2022 Asia Cup	Jakarta, Indonesia	3	Japan (16); Malaysia (11); South Korea (10)
Cancelled (Note: The Oceania Cup could not be completed before the qualification deadline due to travel restrictions related to the COVID-19 pandemic. Therefore the two Oceania quota places have been filled based on the FIH Men's World Ranking.)	2022 Oceania Cup	Whangārei, New Zealand	2	Australia (1); New Zealand (9)
Total			16	

=== Draw ===
The draw took place on 8 September 2022.

Pot 1	Pot 2	Pot 3	Pot 4
Australia (assigned to A1); Belgium (assigned to B1); Netherlands (assigned to C1); India (assigned to D1)	Germany; England; Argentina; New Zealand	Spain; Malaysia; France; South Korea	South Africa; Wales; Japan; Chile

=== Squads ===
The sixteen national teams were required to register a playing squad of eighteen players and two reserves.

== Venues ==
Following is a list of all venues and host cities.

2023 Men's FIH Hockey World Cup is located in India	Bhubaneswar	Rourkela
2023 Men's FIH Hockey World Cup is located in India	Kalinga Hockey Stadium	Birsa Munda International Hockey Stadium
2023 Men's FIH Hockey World Cup is located in India	Capacity: 15,000	Capacity: 21,800

== Umpires ==
On 29 November 2021, 18 umpires were appointed by the FIH for this tournament. Before the tournament, the final list was published.

- Rawi Anbananthan (MAS)
- Dan Barstow (ENG)
- Bruce Bale (ENG)
- Federico García (URU)
- Ben Göntgen (GER)
- Gareth Greenfield (NZL)
- Marcin Grochal (POL)
- Lim Hong Zhen (SGP)
- Martin Madden (SCO)
- Jakub Mejzlík (CZE)
- Germán Montes de Oca (ARG)
- Raghu Prasad (IND)
- Sean Rapaport (RSA)
- Steve Rogers (AUS)
- Javed Shaikh (IND)
- David Tomlinson (NZL)
- Coen van Bunge (NED)
- Jonas van 't Hek (NED)

== First round ==
The schedule was published on 8 September 2022.

All times are local (UTC+5:30).

=== Pool A ===
Pos	Team	Pld	W	D	L	GF	GA	GD	Pts	Qualification
1	Australia	3	2	1	0	20	5	+15	7	Quarter-finals
2	Argentina	3	1	2	0	9	8	+1	5	Cross-overs
3	France	3	1	1	1	7	14	−7	4	Cross-overs
4	South Africa	3	0	0	3	3	12	−9	0	

Source: FIH
Rules for classification: 1) points; 2) matches won; 3) goal difference; 4) goals for; 5) head-to-head result; 6) field goals scored.

13 January 2023
13:00

Argentina	1–0	South Africa
Casella 43'	Report

Kalinga Stadium, Bhubaneswar
Umpires:
Coen van Bunge (NED)
Dan Barstow (ENG)

13 January 2023
15:00

Australia	8–0	France
Craig 9', 32', 45'; Ogilvie 27'; Hayward 27', 29', 39'; Wickham 54'	Report

Kalinga Stadium, Bhubaneswar
Umpires:
Martin Madden (SCO)
David Tomlinson (NZL)

16 January 2023
17:00

France	2–1	South Africa
Charlet 8', 57'	Report	Beauchamp 15+'

Kalinga Stadium, Bhubaneswar
Umpires:
Coen van Bunge (NED)
Rawi Anbananthan (MAS)

16 January 2023
19:00

Argentina	3–3	Australia
Domene 19'; Casella 33'; Ferreiro 49'	Report	Hayward 10'; Beale 30'; Govers 58'

Kalinga Stadium, Bhubaneswar
Umpires:
Martin Madden (SCO)
Dan Barstow (ENG)

20 January 2023
13:00

Australia	9–2	South Africa
Govers 4', 15', 19', 20'; Craig 10'; Harvie 22'; Ephraums 28'; Hayward 32'; Brand 47'	Report	Ntuli 8'; Kok 58'

Birsa Munda International Hockey Stadium, Rourkela
Umpires:
Ben Göntgen (GER)
David Tomlinson (NZL)

20 January 2023
15:00

France	5–5	Argentina
Tynevez 11'; Charlet 36', 38', 49', 60'	Report	Keenan 3'; Della Torre 34', 42', 60'; Ferreiro 51'

Birsa Munda International Hockey Stadium, Rourkela
Umpires:
Steve Rogers (AUS)
Sean Rapaport (RSA)

=== Pool B ===
Pos	Team	Pld	W	D	L	GF	GA	GD	Pts	Qualification
1	Belgium	3	2	1	0	14	3	+11	7	Quarter-finals
2	Germany	3	2	1	0	12	4	+8	7	Cross-overs
3	South Korea	3	1	0	2	4	13	−9	3	Cross-overs
4	Japan	3	0	0	3	2	12	−10	0	

Source: FIH
Rules for classification: 1) points; 2) matches won; 3) goal difference; 4) goals for; 5) head-to-head result; 6) field goals scored.

14 January 2023
17:00

Belgium	5–0	South Korea
Hendrickx 31'; Cosyns 43'; Van Aubel 50'; Dockier 52'; De Sloover 58'	Report

Kalinga Stadium, Bhubaneswar
Umpires:
Jonas van 't Hek (NED)
Javed Shaikh (IND)

14 January 2023
19:00

Germany	3–0	Japan
M. Grambusch 36'; Rühr 41'; Prinz 49'	Report

Kalinga Stadium, Bhubaneswar
Umpires:
Raghu Prasad (IND)
Gareth Greenfield (NZL)

17 January 2023
17:00

South Korea	2–1	Japan
Lee J. 9', 24'	Report	Nagayoshi 2'

Kalinga Stadium, Bhubaneswar
Umpires:
Jonas van 't Heck (NED)
Raghu Prasad (IND)

17 January 2023
19:00

Germany	2–2	Belgium
Wellen 23'; T. Grambusch 53'	Report	Charlier 10'; Wegnez 55'

Kalinga Stadium, Bhubaneswar
Umpires:
David Tomlinson (NZL)
Gareth Geenfield (NZL)

20 January 2023
17:00

Belgium	7–1	Japan
Charlier 18'; Boon 22', 27', 28', 51', 56'; Dockier 52'	Report	Fukuda 46'

Birsa Munda International Hockey Stadium, Rourkela
Umpires:
Javed Shaikh (IND)
Federico García (URU)

20 January 2023
19:00

South Korea	2–7	Germany
Jang 15', 60'	Report	Wellen 2', 17', 41'; Peillat 43'; Weigand 51'; M. Grambusch 53'; Ludwig 53'

Birsa Munda International Hockey Stadium, Rourkela
Umpires:
Lim Hong Zhen (SGP)
Jakub Mejzlík (CZE)

=== Pool C ===
Pos	Team	Pld	W	D	L	GF	GA	GD	Pts	Qualification
1	Netherlands	3	3	0	0	22	0	+22	9	Quarter-finals
2	Malaysia	3	2	0	1	6	8	−2	6	Cross-overs
3	New Zealand	3	1	0	2	5	8	−3	3	Cross-overs
4	Chile	3	0	0	3	3	20	−17	0	

Source: FIH
Rules for classification: 1) points; 2) matches won; 3) goal difference; 4) goals for; 5) head-to-head result; 6) field goals scored.

14 January 2023
13:00

New Zealand	3–1	Chile
Lane 10'; Hiha 12', 19'	Report	Contardo 50'

Birsa Munda International Hockey Stadium, Rourkela
Umpires:
Bruce Bale (ENG)
Federico García (URU)

14 January 2023
15:00

Netherlands	4–0	Malaysia
Van Dam 20'; Janssen 24'; Beins 47'; Croon 60'	Report

Birsa Munda International Hockey Stadium, Rourkela
Umpires:
Sean Rapaport (RSA)
Jakub Mejzlík (CZE)

16 January 2023
13:00

Malaysia	3–2	Chile
Razie 26'; Ashran 41'; Norsyafiq 42'	Report	Amoroso 20'; Rodríguez 29'

Birsa Munda International Hockey Stadium, Rourkela
Umpires:
Ben Göntgen (GER)
Germán Montes de Oca (ARG)

16 January 2023
15:00

New Zealand	0–4	Netherlands
	Report	Brinkman 3', 13'; Bijen 20'; Hoedemakers 55'

Birsa Munda International Hockey Stadium, Rourkela
Umpires:
Lim Hong Zhen (SGP)
Federico García (URU)

19 January 2023
13:00

Malaysia	3–2	New Zealand
Faizal 9', 57'; Razie 43'	Report	Phillips 52'; Lane 53'

Kalinga Stadium, Bhubaneswar
Umpires:
Martin Madden (SCO)
Bruce Bale (ENG)

19 January 2023
15:00

Netherlands	14–0	Chile
Janssen 7', 30', 35', 45'; De Vilder 23'; Van Dam 24'; Brinkman 26', 34', 59'; Pieters 38'; Bijen 41', 46'; Blok 43'; Beins 49'	Report

Kalinga Stadium, Bhubaneswar
Umpires:
Dan Barstow (ENG)
Rawi Anbananthan (MAS)

=== Pool D ===
Pos	Team	Pld	W	D	L	GF	GA	GD	Pts	Qualification
1	England	3	2	1	0	9	0	+9	7	Quarter-finals
2	India (H)	3	2	1	0	6	2	+4	7	Cross-overs
3	Spain	3	1	0	2	5	7	−2	3	Cross-overs
4	Wales	3	0	0	3	3	14	−11	0	

Source: FIH
Rules for classification: 1) points; 2) matches won; 3) goal difference; 4) goals for; 5) head-to-head result; 6) field goals scored.
(H) Hosts

13 January 2023
17:00

England	5–0	Wales
Park 1'; Ansell 28', 38'; Roper 42'; Bandurak 58'	Report

Birsa Munda International Hockey Stadium, Rourkela
Umpires:
German Montes de Oca (ARG)
Lim Hong-Zhen (SGP)

13 January 2023
19:00

India	2–0	Spain
Amit 13'; Hardik 26'	Report

Birsa Munda International Hockey Stadium, Rourkela
Umpires:
Steve Rogers (AUS)
Jakub Mejzlik (CZE)

15 January 2023
17:00

Spain	5–1	Wales
Reyné 17', 39'; Iglesias 23'; Miralles 33', 57'	Report	Carson 53'

Birsa Munda International Hockey Stadium, Rourkela
Umpires:
Ben Göntgen (GER)
Sean Rapaport (RSA)

15 January 2023
19:00

England	0–0	India
	Report

Birsa Munda International Hockey Stadium, Rourkela
Umpires:
Marcin Grochal (POL)
Steve Rogers (AUS)

19 January 2023
17:00

Spain	0–4	England
	Report	Roper 11'; Condon 22'; Bandurak 51'; Ansell 52'

Kalinga Stadium, Bhubaneswar
Umpires:
Marcin Grochal (POL)
Coen van Bunge (NED)

19 January 2023
19:00

India	4–2	Wales
Shamsher 22'; Akashdeep 33', 46'; Harmanpreet 60'	Report	Furlong 43'; Draper 45'

Kalinga Stadium, Bhubaneswar
Umpires:
Jonas van 't Hek (NED)
Gareth Greenfield (NZL)

== Classification round ==
=== 9th–16th place classification ===
26 January 2023
11:30

South Africa	6–3	Malaysia
Sherwood 9', 57'; Morgan 17'; Ntuli 26'; Horne 43'; M. Cassiem 44'	Report	Razie 35', 45'; Firhan 57'

Birsa Munda International Hockey Stadium, Rourkela
Umpires:
Germán Montes de Oca (ARG)
Bruce Bale (ENG)

26 January 2023
14:00

Wales	2–2	France
Hawker 10'; Furlong 23'	Report	Sellier 15', 21'
Penalties
Prosser (penalty shoot-out missed); Shipperley (penalty shoot-out scored); Pritchard (penalty shoot-out missed); Francis (penalty shoot-out scored)	2–1	(penalty shoot-out missed) Lockwood; (penalty shoot-out missed) Jouin; (penalty shoot-out missed) Tynevez; (penalty shoot-out scored) Clément; (penalty shoot-out missed) Baumgarten

Birsa Munda International Hockey Stadium, Rourkela
Umpires:
David Tomlinson (NZL)
Sean Rapaport (RSA)

26 January 2023
16:30

Chile	0–8	Argentina
	Report	Della Torre 9'; Casella 17', 34'; Toscani 19'; Capurro 23'; Keenan 25'; Ferreiro 51'; Domene 56'

Birsa Munda International Hockey Stadium, Rourkela
Umpires:
Javed Shaikh (IND)
Rawi Anbananthan (MAS)

26 January 2023
19:00

Japan	0–8	India
	Report	Mandeep 33'; Abhishek 36', 44'; Vivek 40'; Harmanpreet 46', 59'; Manpreet 59'; Sukhjeet 60'

Birsa Munda International Hockey Stadium, Rourkela
Umpires:
Lim Hong Zhen (SGP)
Federico García (URU)

=== 13th–16th place classification ===
28 January 2023
11:30

Malaysia	3–2	Japan
Shello 8', 32'; Shahmie 34'	Report	K. Tanaka 24'; S. Tanaka 32'

Birsa Munda International Hockey Stadium, Rourkela
Umpires:
Germán Montes de Oca (ARG)
David Tomlinson (NZL)

28 January 2023
14:00

Chile	2–4	France
Becerra 21'; Pizarro 54'	Report	Curty 14'; Charlet 18', 18'; Xavier 43'

Birsa Munda International Hockey Stadium, Rourkela
Umpires:
Federico García (URU)
Rawi Anbananthan (MAS)

=== 9th–12th place classification ===
28 January 2023
16:30

Argentina	6–0	Wales
Toscani 16'; Ferreiro 29', 49'; Bugallo 31'; Tarazona 37'; Casella 48'	Report

Birsa Munda International Hockey Stadium, Rourkela
Umpires:
Lim Hong Zhen (SGP)
Sean Rapaport (RSA)

28 January 2023
19:00

South Africa	2–5	India
Mvimbi 49'; M. Cassiem 60'	Report	Abhishek 5'; Harmanpreet 12'; Shamsher 56'; Akashdeep 49'; Sukhjeet 59'

Birsa Munda International Hockey Stadium, Rourkela
Umpires:
Jonas van 't Hek (NED)
Bruce Bale (ENG)

== Second round ==
=== Bracket ===
Crossovers
22 January
Malaysia	2 (3)
Spain (p.s.o.)	2 (4)
23 January
Germany	5
France	1
22 January
India	3 (4)
New Zealand (p.s.o.)	3 (5)
23 January
Argentina	5 (2)
South Korea (p.s.o.)	5 (3)

Quarter-finals
24 January
Australia	4
Spain	3
25 January
England	2 (3)
Germany (p.s.o.)	2 (4)
24 January
Belgium	2
New Zealand	0
25 January
Netherlands	5
South Korea	1

Semi-finals
27 January
Australia	3
Germany	4
27 January
Belgium (p.s.o.)	2 (3)
Netherlands	2 (2)

Final
29 January
Germany (p.s.o.)	3 (5)
Belgium	3 (4)
Third place
29 January
Australia	1
Netherlands	3

=== Crossovers ===
22 January 2023
16:30

Malaysia	2–2	Spain
Faizal 35'; Shello 49'	Report	Miralles 41'; Gispert 42'
Penalties
Firhan (penalty shoot-out scored); Faizal (penalty shoot-out scored); Marhan (penalty shoot-out missed); Shahmie (penalty shoot-out scored); Shello (penalty shoot-out missed); Firhan (penalty shoot-out missed)	3–4	(penalty shoot-out missed) Iglesias; (penalty shoot-out scored) Miralles; (penalty shoot-out scored) Bonastre; (penalty shoot-out scored) Recasens; (penalty shoot-out missed) Reyné; (penalty shoot-out scored) Miralles

Kalinga Stadium, Bhubaneswar
Umpires:
Marcin Grochal (POL)
Ben Göntgen (GER)

22 January 2023
19:00

India	3–3	New Zealand
Lalit 18'; Sukhjeet 25'; Varun 41'	Report	Lane 29'; Russell 44'; Findlay 50'
Penalties
Harmanpreet (penalty shoot-out scored); Raj (penalty shoot-out scored); Abhishek (penalty shoot-out missed); Shamsher (penalty shoot-out missed); Sukhjeet (penalty shoot-out scored); Harmanpreet (penalty shoot-out missed); Raj (penalty shoot-out scored); Sukhjeet (penalty shoot-out missed); Shamsher (penalty shoot-out missed)	4–5	(penalty shoot-out scored) Woods; (penalty shoot-out scored) Findlay; (penalty shoot-out scored) Phillips; (penalty shoot-out missed) Lane; (penalty shoot-out missed) Hiha; (penalty shoot-out missed) Woods; (penalty shoot-out scored) Findlay; (penalty shoot-out missed) Phillips; (penalty shoot-out scored) Lane

Kalinga Stadium, Bhubaneswar
Umpires:
Germán Montes de Oca (ARG)
Sean Rapaport (RSA)

23 January 2023
16:30

Germany	5–1	France
Miltkau 15'; Wellen 19'; M. Grambusch 24'; Trompertz 25'; Peillat 60'	Report	Goyet 58'

Kalinga Stadium, Bhubaneswar
Umpires:
Dan Barstow (ENG)
Coen van Bunge (NED)

23 January 2023
19:00

Argentina	5–5	South Korea
Casella 8'; Keenan 21', 47'; Della Torre 24', 41'	Report	Kim S. 18'; Jeong 20'; Jang J. 41', 50'; Lee N. 56'
Penalties
Domene (penalty shoot-out missed); Toscani (penalty shoot-out missed); Keenan (penalty shoot-out scored); Casella (penalty shoot-out scored); Ferreiro (penalty shoot-out missed)	2–3	(penalty shoot-out scored) Lee J. (penalty shoot-out missed) Hwang; (penalty shoot-out scored) Ji; (penalty shoot-out scored) Jung

Kalinga Stadium, Bhubaneswar
Umpires:
Jonas van 't Hek (NED)
Raghu Prasad (IND)

=== Quarter-finals ===
24 January 2023
16:30

Australia	4–3	Spain
Ogilvie 30'; Zalewski 32'; Hayward 33', 37'	Report	Gispert 20'; Recasens 24'; Miralles 41'

Kalinga Stadium, Bhubaneswar
Umpires:
Martin Madden (SCO)
Coen van Bunge (NED)

24 January 2023
19:00

Belgium	2–0	New Zealand
Boon 11'; Van Aubel 16'	Report

Kalinga Stadium, Bhubaneswar
Umpires:
Dan Barstow (ENG)
Raghu Prasad (IND)

25 January 2023
16:30

England	2–2	Germany
Wallace 12'; Ansell 33'	Report	M. Grambusch 58'; T. Grambusch 59'
Penalties
Albery (penalty shoot-out scored); Wallace (penalty shoot-out scored); Goodfield (penalty shoot-out missed); Roper (penalty shoot-out scored); Ansell (penalty shoot-out missed)	3–4	(penalty shoot-out scored) Wellen; (penalty shoot-out scored) H. Müller; (penalty shoot-out scored) Prinz; (penalty shoot-out scored) Rühr

Kalinga Stadium, Bhubaneswar
Umpires:
Steve Rogers (AUS)
Jakub Mejzlík (CZE)

25 January 2023
19:00

Netherlands	5–1	South Korea
Bijen 27', 31'; Blok 36'; Van Heijningen 50'; Beins 58'	Report	Seo 51'

Kalinga Stadium, Bhubaneswar
Umpires:
Ben Göntgen (GER)
Gareth Greenfield (NZL)

=== Semi-finals ===
27 January 2023
16:30

Australia	3–4	Germany
Hayward 12'; Ephraums 27'; Govers 58'	Report	Peillat 43', 52', 59'; Wellen 60'

Kalinga Stadium, Bhubaneswar
Umpires:
Marcin Grochal (POL)
Coen van Bunge (NED)

27 January 2023
19:00

Belgium	2–2	Netherlands
Boon 27'; De Kerpel 45'	Report	Janssen 12', 36'
Penalties
Van Aubel (penalty shoot-out scored); De Sloover (penalty shoot-out scored); Wegnez (penalty shoot-out scored); Cosyns (penalty shoot-out missed)	3–2	(penalty shoot-out missed) Van Dam; (penalty shoot-out scored) Croon; (penalty shoot-out scored) De Geus; (penalty shoot-out missed) Pieters; (penalty shoot-out missed) Van Ass

Kalinga Stadium, Bhubaneswar
Umpires:
Jakub Mejzlík (CZE)
Steve Rogers (AUS)

=== Third and fourth place ===
29 January 2023
16:30

Australia	1–3	Netherlands
Hayward 13'	Report	Janssen 33'; Brinkman 35', 40'

Kalinga Stadium, Bhubaneswar
Umpires:
Dan Barstow (ENG)
Martin Madden (SCO)

=== Final ===
29 January 2023
19:00

Germany	3–3	Belgium
Wellen 29'; Peillat 41'; M. Grambusch 48'	Report	Van Aubel 10'; Cosyns 11'; Boon 59'
Penalties
Wellen (penalty shoot-out scored); H. Müller (penalty shoot-out scored); Miltkau (penalty shoot-out missed); Prinz (penalty shoot-out scored); M. Grambusch (penalty shoot-out missed); Wellen (penalty shoot-out scored); Prinz (penalty shoot-out scored)	5–4	(penalty shoot-out scored) Van Aubel; (penalty shoot-out missed) De Sloover; (penalty shoot-out missed) Wegnez; (penalty shoot-out scored) Cosyns; (penalty shoot-out scored) Kina; (penalty shoot-out scored) Van Aubel; (penalty shoot-out missed) Cosyns

Kalinga Stadium, Bhubaneswar
Umpires:
Jakub Mejzlík (CZE)
Steve Rogers (AUS)

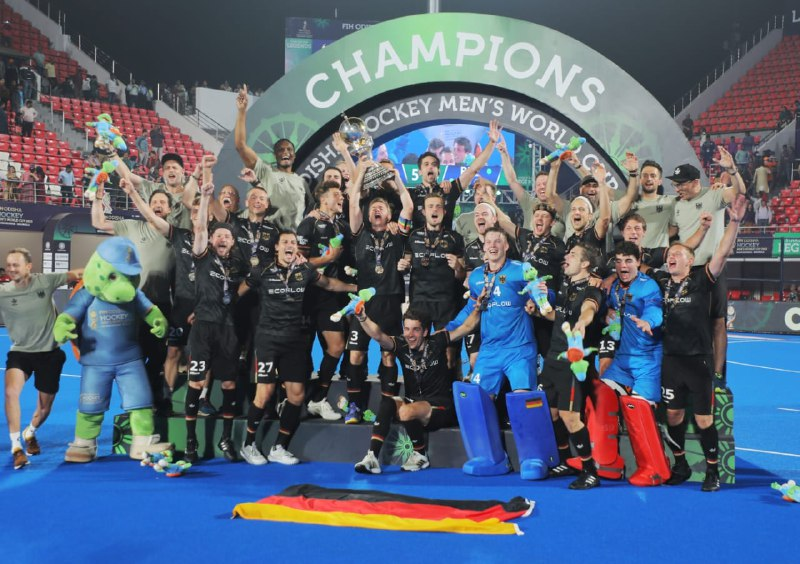
Germany's players lifting the World Cup trophy

== Final ranking ==
Pos	Grp	Team	Pld	W	D	L	GF	GA	GD	Pts	Final result
1st place, gold medalist(s)	B	Germany	7	4	3	0	26	13	+13	15	Gold medal
2nd place, silver medalist(s)	B	Belgium	6	3	3	0	21	8	+13	12	Silver medal
3rd place, bronze medalist(s)	C	Netherlands	6	5	1	0	32	4	+28	16	Bronze medal
4	A	Australia	6	3	1	2	28	15	+13	10	Fourth place
5	D	England	4	2	2	0	11	2	+9	8	Eliminated in Quarterfinals
6	D	Spain	5	1	1	3	10	13	−3	4	Eliminated in Quarterfinals
7	C	New Zealand	5	1	1	3	8	13	−5	4	Eliminated in Quarterfinals
8	B	South Korea	5	1	1	3	10	23	−13	4	Eliminated in Quarterfinals
9	A	Argentina	6	3	3	0	28	13	+15	12	Ninth place
9	D	India (H)	6	4	2	0	22	7	+15	14	Ninth place
11	A	South Africa	5	1	0	4	11	20	−9	3	Eleventh place
11	D	Wales	5	0	1	4	5	22	−17	1	Eleventh place
13	A	France	6	2	2	2	14	23	−9	8	Thirteenth place
13	C	Malaysia	6	3	1	2	14	18	−4	10	Thirteenth place
15	C	Chile	5	0	0	5	5	32	−27	0	Fifteenth place
15	B	Japan	5	0	0	5	4	23	−19	0	Fifteenth place

Source: FIH
(H) Hosts

== Awards ==
The following awards were given at the conclusion of the tournament.

Award	Player
Player of the tournament	(Germany) Niklas Wellen
Top goalscorer	(Australia) Jeremy Hayward
Goalkeeper of the tournament	(Belgium) Vincent Vanasch
Young player of the tournament	(South Africa) Mustapha Cassiem
Fair play award	Belgium

== Goalscorers ==
There were 249 goals scored in 44 matches, for an average of 5.66 goals per match.

9 goals

- (Australia) Jeremy Hayward

8 goals

- (Belgium) Tom Boon
- (France) Victor Charlet
- (Netherlands) Jip Janssen

7 goals

- (Germany) Niklas Wellen
- (Netherlands) Thierry Brinkman

6 goals

- (Argentina) Maico Casella
- (Argentina) Nicolás Della Torre
- (Australia) Blake Govers
- (Germany) Gonzalo Peillat

5 goals

- (Argentina) Martín Ferreiro
- (Germany) Mats Grambusch
- (Netherlands) Koen Bijen

4 goals

- (Argentina) Nicolás Keenan
- (Australia) Tom Craig
- (England) Liam Ansell
- (India) Harmanpreet Singh
- (Malaysia) Razie Rahim
- (South Korea) Jang Jong-hyun
- (Spain) Marc Miralles

3 goals

- (Belgium) Florent Van Aubel
- (India) Abhishek
- (India) Akashdeep Singh
- (India) Sukhjeet Singh
- (Malaysia) Faizal Saari
- (Malaysia) Shello Silverius
- (Netherlands) Teun Beins
- (New Zealand) Sam Lane

2 goals

- (Argentina) Tomas Domene
- (Argentina) Lucas Toscani
- (Australia) Daniel Beale
- (Australia) Flynn Ogilvie
- (Belgium) Cédric Charlier
- (Belgium) Tanguy Cosyns
- (Belgium) Sébastien Dockier
- (England) Nick Bandurak
- (England) Phil Roper
- (France) Corentin Sellier
- (Germany) Tom Grambusch
- (India) Shamsher Singh
- (Netherlands) Justen Blok
- (Netherlands) Thijs van Dam
- (New Zealand) Sam Hiha
- (South Africa) Mustapha Cassiem
- (South Africa) Nqobile Ntuli
- (South Africa) Bradley Sherwood
- (South Korea) Lee Jung-jun
- (Spain) Xavier Gispert
- (Spain) Marc Reyné
- (Wales) Gareth Furlong

1 goal

- (Argentina) Agustín Bugallo
- (Argentina) Bautista Capurro
- (Argentina) Santiago Tarazona
- (Australia) Tim Brand
- (Australia) Nathan Ephraums
- (Australia) Jake Harvie
- (Australia) Tom Wickham
- (Australia) Aran Zalewski
- (Belgium) Nicolas De Kerpel
- (Belgium) Alexander Hendrickx
- (Belgium) Victor Wegnez
- (Belgium) Arthur De Sloover
- (Chile) Juan Amoroso
- (Chile) Franco Becerra
- (Chile) Ignacio Contardo
- (Chile) Andrés Pizarro
- (Chile) Martín Rodríguez
- (England) David Condon
- (England) Nick Park
- (England) Zachary Wallace
- (France) Eliot Curty
- (France) François Goyet
- (France) Etienne Tynevez
- (France) Gaspard Xavier
- (Germany) Moritz Ludwig
- (Germany) Marco Miltkau
- (Germany) Thies Prinz
- (Germany) Christopher Rühr
- (Germany) Moritz Trompertz
- (Germany) Justus Weigand
- (India) Varun Kumar
- (India) Vivek Prasad
- (India) Amit Rohidas
- (India) Hardik Singh
- (India) Mandeep Singh
- (India) Manpreet Singh
- (India) Lalit Upadhyay
- (Japan) Kentaro Fukuda
- (Japan) Ken Nagayoshi
- (Japan) Kaito Tanaka
- (Japan) Seren Tanaka
- (Malaysia) Firhan Ashari
- (Malaysia) Ashran Hamsani
- (Malaysia) Shahmie Irfan Suhaimi
- (Malaysia) Norsyafiq Sumantri
- (Netherlands) Jorrit Croon
- (Netherlands) Steijn van Heijningen
- (Netherlands) Tjep Hoedemakers
- (Netherlands) Terrance Pieters
- (Netherlands) Derck de Vilder
- (New Zealand) Sean Findlay
- (New Zealand) Hayden Phillips
- (New Zealand) Kane Russell
- (South Africa) Connor Beauchamp
- (South Africa) Keenan Horne
- (South Africa) Tevin Kok
- (South Africa) Guy Morgan
- (South Africa) Samkelo Mvimbi
- (South Korea) Jeong Jun-woo
- (South Korea) Kim Sung-hyun
- (South Korea) Lee Nam-yong
- (South Korea) Seo In-woo
- (Spain) Álvaro Iglesias
- (Spain) Marc Recasens
- (Wales) James Carson
- (Wales) Jacob Draper
- (Wales) Luke Hawker

Source: FIH

== Controversies ==
A pool match played between South Korea and Japan on 17 January ended in controversy after a late match substitution led to 12 Japanese players being on the pitch. According to an FIH statement "In the last moments of today's FIH Hockey Men's World Cup match between Japan and Korea, the Japanese team had 12 players on the field of play, instead of a maximum of 11 as stipulated in the FIH Rules of Hockey". Following discussion with FIH officials, the Japanese team explained that the incident was an accident and expressed their apologies to the FIH and opposition. The FIH is investigating the incident.

== See also ==
- 2022 Women's FIH Hockey World Cup
- 2023 Men's FIH Hockey Junior World Cup
- 2023 Men's FIH Indoor Hockey World Cup
