= Scottish Hockey Cup =

Scottish field hockey competition

Scottish Cup
- Founded: 1962
- First season: 1962-63
- Administrator: Scottish Hockey Union
- No. of teams: 26 (2018-19 season)
- Country: Scotland
- Most recent champion: Edinburgh University
- Most titles: Edinburgh Hockey Club (13 titles)
- Website: Scottish Cup

The Scottish Hockey Cup or just Scottish Cup is the top men's cup competition in Scottish Field Hockey. The competition starts in September each year, with the final being held in May, at Glasgow National Hockey Centre.

== Format ==
Clubs enter the Scottish Cup each year through the Scottish Hockey Union and fixtures are drawn up by Scottish Hockey. Recently, the draws have been live streamed on Scottish Hockey's YouTube channel. Teams play each other once, with the winning team going through and losing team entering the Scottish Plate. In the result of tie, teams go to a penalty shoot out.

== Past winners ==
Season	Champions	Runners-up
1962-63	Morgan Academy FP's	Unknown
1963-64	Aberdeen Grammar School FP's	Unknown
1964-65	Clydesdale	Unknown
1965-66	Aberdeen Grammar School FP's	Inverleith
1966-67	Grove Academy FP's	Morgan Academy FP's
1967-68	Inverleith	Unknown
1968-69	Stepps	Unknown
1969-70	Edinburgh Civil Service	Unknown
1970-71	Harris Academy FP's	Aberdeen Grammar School FP’s
1971-72	Stepps	Aberdeen Grammar School FP's
1972-73	Dundee Wanderers	Inverleith
1973-74	Edinburgh Civil Service	Unknown
1974-75	Inverleith	Stepps
1975-76	Edinburgh Civil Service	Unknown
1976-77	Edinburgh Civil Service	Unknown
1977-78	Edinburgh Civil Service	Unknown
1978-79	Edinburgh Civil Service	Western
1979-80	I.C.I. Grangemouth	Unknown
1980-81	Edinburgh Civil Service	Unknown
1981-82	Grange	Perthshire
1982-83	Edinburgh Civil Service	Unknown
1983-84	Edinburgh Civil Service	Perthshire
1984-85	Edinburgh Civil Service	Kelburne
1985-86	Western	Dundee Wanderers
1986-87	Edinburgh Civil Service	Kelburne
1987-88	Edinburgh Civil Service	Unknown
1988-89	Grove Menzieshill	Gordonians
1989-90	Dundee Wanderers	Unknown
1990-91	Edinburgh Civil Service	Western
1991-92	Kelburne	Unknown

Season	Champions	Runners-up
1992-93	Gordonians	MIM Edinburgh
1993-94	Grange	Western
1994-95	Gordonians	Western
1995-96	Western	Dundee Wanderers
1996-97	Gordonians	Unknown
1997-98	Western	MIM Edinburgh
1998-99	Western	Dundee Wanderers
1999-00	Western	Kelburne
2000-01	Gordonians	Dundee Wanderers
2001-02	Greenock HC	Watsonians
2002-03	Western	Kelburne
2003-04	Western	Kelburne
2004-05	Western	Kelburne
2005-06	Kelburne	
2006-07	Kelburne	Grange
2007-08	Kelburne	Unknown
2008-09	Grange	Inverleith
2009-10	Kelburne	Unknown
2010-11	Western	Kelburne
2011-12	Kelburne	Grange
2012-13	Grove Menzieshill	Kelburne
2013-14	Grange	Inverleith
2014-15	Grange	Edinburgh University
2015-16	Kelburne	Edinburgh University
2016-17	Kelburne	Grange
2017-18	Grange	Edinburgh University
2018-19	Grange	Grove Menzieshill
2019-20	Cancelled due to COVID-19 Pandemic	
2020-21	Cancelled due to COVID-19 Pandemic	
2021-22	Western	Hillhead
2022-23	Western	Erskine Stewart's Melville
2023-24	Watsonians	Grange
2024-25	Edinburgh University	Hillhead
2025-26	Watsonians	Edinburgh University

Scottish Cup Wins by Club
Club	Titles
Edinburgh Civil Service	13
Western Wildcats	11
Kelburne	9
Grange	8
Gordonians	4
Aberdeen Grammar School FP's	3
Grove Menzieshill	2
Inverleith	2
Stepps	2
Dundee Wanderers	2
Edinburgh University	1
Morgan Academy FP's	1
Clydesdale	1
Grove Academy FP's	1
Harris Academy FP's	1
Grangemouth, formerly ICI	1
Watsonians	2

== Sponsorship ==
The first sponsor of the Cup was the Scottish Daily Mail and it was known as the Scottish Daily Mail Trophy. This ran from 1962 until 1971 when the Daily Mail moved to Manchester. After that, The Scotsman took over sponsorship and clubs played for the Scotsman Cup. This ran from 1972 until 1997. Arthur McKay Building Support services sponsored the competition from 2011 until 2013.

== Scottish Plate ==
The Scottish Plate is the second cup competition in Scottish Hockey. It is contested between the teams that are knocked out of the Scottish Cup in the first round. Teams knocked out compete in the same knock out format as the Scottish Cup. The finals are played in May at the same time as the Cup at the Glasgow National Hockey Centre. The first recorded plate match is from the 1998-99 season however other matches may have occurred before that.

=== Past winners ===
Season	Champions	Runners-up
1998-99	Harris Academy FP's	Unknown
1999-00	Harris Academy FP's	Unknown
2000-01	Unknown	Unknown
2001-02	Stepps	MGM
2002-03	Watsonians	Greenock
2003-04	Hillhead	GHK
2004-05	Watsonians	Granite City
2005-06	Unknown	Unknown
2006-07	Uddingston	Edinburgh HC
2007-08	Unknown	Granite City
2008-09	Erskine Stewart's Melville	Unknown
2009-10	Highland Inveross	Giffnock
2010-11	Hillhead	Unknown
2011-12	Hillhead	Unknown

Season	Champions	Runners-up
2012-13	Hillhead	Aberdeen Grammar FP's
2013-14	Uddingston	Granite City
2014-15	Clydesdale	Falkirk
2015-16	Falkirk	Granite City
2016-17	Western	Watsonians
2017-18	Gordonians	Stepps
2018-19	Carnegie	Highland
2019-20	Cancelled due to COVID-19 Pandemic	
2020-21	Cancelled due to COVID-19 Pandemic	
2021-22	FMGM Monarchs	Perthshire
2022-23	FMGM Monarchs	Gordonians
2023-24	Edinburgh University	Dundee Wanderers
2024-25	Inverleith	Dundee Wanderers
2025-26	Western	Erskine Stewart's Melville
