= List of Scottish hockey other National League champions =

The List of men's Scottish hockey other National League champions are the champions of the National League system in Scotland below the top tier Scottish Hockey Premiership (formerly National League 1) and the second tier Scottish National League (formerly national league 2).

== Leagues ==
=== Men ===
==== National League 3 (1975–2019) ====
The men's Scottish hockey National League 3 champions are the winners of the third-tier league in men's hockey in Scotland. The 2019–20 season was the last season of the third-tier league. After the COVID-19 pandemic in Scotland, only 24 teams entered the National Competition and so a third league was not required. The leagues are overseen by the Scottish Hockey Union

The national league and subsequent leagues were founded in 1975 after competitive district hockey proved popular. An annual tournament pitted the top teams from each district against one another and this eventually formed the basis of a national league system.

The 1974–75 season was the initial steps to form 'official' national leagues in 1975–76. Participating clubs played for league placement for next season. Clubs across Scotland were invited to participate in the National League, with clubs split into three leagues. At the end of the season, the teams were divided into six leagues of 8 teams.

Season	Champions	Runners-up	Third place
1975–76	St Saviours	Univ of Strathclyde	Madras College FP
1976–77	Waverley	Watsonians	Eastbank Academy FP
1977–78	Uddingston	Gordonians	St Saviours
1978–79	Gordonians	Morgan Academy FP	Clydesdale
1979–80	Kelburne	Menzieshill	St Saviours
1980–81	Whitecraigs	Eastbank Academy FP	Watsonians
1981–82	Watsonians	Kelburne	Dunfermline Carnegie
1982–83	Stirling	Eastbank Academy FP	East Kilbride
1983–84	Morgan Academy FP	Dunfermline Carnegie	Cochrane Park
1984–85	Inverleith	Babcock Renfrew	Stepps
1985–86	Edinburgh University	Whitecraigs	Stepps
1986–87	Stepps	Perthshire	Harris Academy FP
1987–88	Harris Academy FP	Watsonians	Dunfermline Carnegie
1988–89	Morgan Academy FP (2)	Ruthrieston	Dundee High School FP
1989–90	Harris Academy FP (2)	Greenock	Dundee High School FP
1990–91	Watsonians (2)	Monifieth	Uddingston
1991–92	Dunfermline Carnegie	Uddingston	Kirkcaldy
1992–93	Edinburgh University (2)	East Kilbride	Giffnock
1993–94	I.C.I. Grangemouth	Perthshire	Grove
1994–95	Dunfermline Carnegie (2)	Harris	East Kilbride
1995–96	Grove DHS	Univ of Dundee	Motherwell
1996–97	Clydebank College	I.C.I. Grangemouth	Ellon Gordon
1997–98	Giffnock (2)	Perthshire	Motherwell
1998–99	Motherwell	Greenock	Stirling Wanderers
1999–2000	I.C.I. Grangemouth (2)	MBC	Dunfermline Carnegie
2000–01	Univ of St Andrews	Dunfermline Carnegie	Aberdeen University
2001–02	Aberdeen University	Hillhead	Falkirk GHG
2002–03	Waverley Inveresk (2)	Aberdeen GSFP	Dunfermline Carnegie
2003–04	Glasgow Eastbank	Dunfermline Carnegie	Falkirk GHG
2004–05	Uddingston (2)	Granite City Wanderers	Waverley Inveresk
2005–06	Granite City Wanderers	Quasar	Waverley Inveresk Trinity
2006–07	Glasgow University	Waverley Inveresk Trinity	Giffnock
2007–08	Giffnock (3)	Falkirk GHG	ESM
2008–09	Univ of St Andrews (2)	Dunfermline Carnegie	ESM
2009–10	Motherwell (2)	Granite City Wanderers	Highland InveRoss
2010–11	Glasgow University (2)	Highland	Aberdeen GSFP
2011–12	Aberdeen GSFP	Univ of Dundee	Greenock
2012–13	ESM	FMGM Monarchs	Harris
2013–14	Greenock Morton	Univ of Dundee	Perthshire
2014–15	Harris (3)	Perthshire	Univ of Strathclyde
2015–16	Univ of Dundee	Aberdeen GSFP	Univ of Strathclyde
2016–17	Perthshire	Univ of Strathclyde	Aberdeen GSFP
2017–18	Aberdeen GSFP (2)	Highland	Univ of Strathclyde
2018–19	ESM (2)	FMGM Monarchs	Univ of Strathclyde
2019–20 (Note: The 2019–20 Scottish Hockey National Leagues were suspended in March 2020 due to the COVID-19 pandemic in Scotland. A points average was taken but no league winners were declared)	Univ of Strathclyde	FMGM Monarchs	Granite City Wanderers

Total titles won

- Clubs no longer active are denoted in italics

Club	Champions	Runners-up	Third place	Last Championship
Giffnock (Note: Formerly known as Whitecraigs)	3	1	2	2007-08
Harris (Note: Formerly known as Harris Academy FP)	3	1	2	2014-15
Dunfermline Carnegie	2	4	4	1994-95
Aberdeen GSFP	2	2	2	2017-18
Falkirk & Linlithgow (Note: Formerly known as I.C.I. Grangemouth and Falkirk GHG)	2	1	2	1999-00
Watsonians	2	2	1	1990-91
Waverley Inveresk (Note: Merger of Waverley and Inveresk)	2	1	2	2002-03
Uddingston	2	1	1	2004-05
Morgan Academy FP (Note: Now part of FMGM Monarchs)	2	1	0	1988-89
Motherwell	2	0	2	2009-10
Edinburgh Univy	2	0	0	1992-93
ESM	2	0	2	2018-19
Glasgow University	2	0	0	2010-11
Univ of St Andrews	2	0	0	2008-09
Perthshire	1	4	1	2016-17
Univ of Dundee	1	3	0	2015-16
Univ of Strathclyde	1	2	4	2019-20
Eastbank (Note: Formerly known as Eastbank FP)	1	2	1	2003-04
Granite City Wanderers (Note: Formerly known as Hazelhead)	1	2	1	2005-06
Greenock	1	2	1	2013-14
Gordonians	1	1	0	1978-79
Kelburne	1	1	0	1979-80
St Saviours	1	0	2	1975-76
Stepps	1	0	2	1986-87
Aberdeen University	1	0	1	2001-02
GHK (Note: Merger of Clydebank TC and Cochrane Park)	1	0	0	1996-97
Grove DHS	1	0	1	1995-96
Stirling Wanderers	1	0	1	1982-93
Inverleith	1	0	0	1984-85

==== National League 4 (1976–1997) ====
The men's Scottish hockey National League 4 champions were the winners of the now defunct fourth-tier league in men's hockey in Scotland. The fourth league was created after the initial season split teams into six leagues of eight teams. The fourth league lasted until the 1997–98 season when the regional leagues were founded. Those teams in the league were moved to the regional league.

Season	Champions	Runners-up	Third place
1976–77	St Saviours	Edinburgh University	Univ of Strathclyde
1977–78	Univ of Strathclyde	Highland	Kelburne
1978–79	Kelburne	Menzieshill	Highland
1979–80	Whitecraigs	Univ of St Andrews	Hillhead
1980–81	East Kilbride	Lawside Academy FP	Glasgow University
1981–82	Stirling Wanderers	Glasgow University	Ayr
1982–83	Cochrane Park	Clydebank TC	Lawside Academy FP
1983–84	Highland	Glasgow Asians	Linlathen
1984–85	Dundee High School FP	Lawside Academy FP	Hillhead
1985–86	Harris Academy FP	Univ of Dundee	Kirkcaldy
1986–87	Dundee High School FP (2)	Hillhead	Kirkcaldy
1987–88	Kirkcaldy	Greenock	East Kilbride
1988–89	Anchor	East Kilbride	Waverley
1989–90	Motherwell	Monifieth	Dunfermline Carnegie
1990–91	Dunfermline Carnegie	Hillhead	Eastbank
1991–92	Clydebank TC	Cochrane Park	Highland
1992–93	Grove	Glasgow University	Ruthrieston
1993–94	Highland (2)	Cochrane Park	Stirling University
1994–95	Ruthrieston	Univ of Dundee	Univ of St Andrews
1995–96	Ellon Gordon	Inveresk	Monifieth
1996–97	Cochrane Park (2)	Univ of St Andrews	Hillhead

Total titles won

- Clubs no longer active are denoted in italics

Club	Champions	Runners-up	Third place	Last Championship
GHK	3	3	0	1996-97
Highland	2	1	2	1993-94
Dundee High School FP	2	0	0	1986-87
East Kilbride	1	1	1	1980-81
Kirkcaldy	1	0	2	1987-88
Dunfermline Carnegie	1	0	1	1990-91
Kelburne	1	0	1	1978-79
MBC (Note: Formerly known as Ruthrieston)	1	0	1	1994-95
Univ of Strathclyde	1	0	1	1977-78
Anchor	1	0	0	1988-89
Ellon Gordon	1	0	0	1995-96
Giffnock	1	0	0	1979-80
Grove	1	0	0	1992-93
Harris	1	0	0	1985-86
Motherwell	1	0	0	1989-90
St Saviours	1	0	0	1976-77
Stirling Wanderers	1	0	0	1981-82

==== National League 5 (1976–1997) ====
The men's Scottish hockey National League 5 champions were the winners of the now defunct fifth-tier league in men's hockey in Scotland. The fifth league was created after the initial season split teams into six leagues of eight teams. The fifth league lasted until the 1997–98 season when the regional leagues were founded. Those teams in the league were moved to the regional league.

Season	Champions	Runners-up	Third place
1976–77	Kilmarnock	Lawside Academy FP	Madras College FP
1977–78	Menzieshill	Lawside Academy FP	Glasgow University
1978–79	Glasgow University	Univ of St Andrews	Lawside Academy FP
1979–80	East Kilbride	Clydebank TC	Bishopbriggs
1980–81	Stirling Wanderers	Bishopbriggs	Anchor
1981–82	Anchor	Dundee High School FP	Aberdeen University
1982–83	Linlathen	Glasgow Asians	Bo'ness
1983–84	Bo'ness	Aberdeen University	Madras College FP
1984–85	Univ of Dundee	Bishopbriggs	Irvine
1985–86	Ayr	Anchor	Madras College FP
1986–87	Greenock	Bo'ness	Garthamlock/Poloc
1987–88	Aberdeen	Grove	Linlathen
1988–89	Monifieth	Motherwell	Aberdeen University
1989–90	Univ of St Andrews	Aberdeen University	Aberdeen
1990–91	Grove	Clydebank TC	Bishopbriggs
1991–92	Glasgow University (2)	Cosmos	Madras College FP
1992–93	Ellon Gordon	Stirling University	Heriot Watt University
1993–94	Heriot Watt University	Univ of Dundee	Cosmos
1994–95	Ellon Gordon (2)	Inveresk	Anchor
1995–96	Waverley	Anchor	Univ of Strathclyde
1996–97	Highland	Monifieth	Glasgow University

Total titles won

- Clubs no longer active are denoted in italics

Club	Champions	Runners-up	Third place	Last Championship
Glasgow University	2	0	2	1991-92
Ellon Gordon	2	0	0	1995-96
Aberdeen	1	2	3	1987-88
Anchor	1	2	2	1981-82
Bo'ness	1	1	1	1983-84
Univ of Dundee	1	1	0	1984-85
Grove	1	1	0	1990-91
Monifieth	1	1	0	1988-99
Univ of St Andrews	1	1	0	1989-90
Waverley Inveresk Trinity	1	1	0	1995-96
Heriot Watt University	1	0	1	1993-94
Irvine (Note: Formerly known as Kilmarnock)	1	0	1	1976-77
Linlathen	1	0	1	1982-83
Ayr	1	0	0	1985-86
East Kilbride	1	0	0	1979-80
Greenock	1	0	0	1986-87
Highland	1	0	0	1996-97
Menzieshill	1	0	0	1977-78
Stirling Wanderers	1	0	0	1980-81

==== National League 6 (1976–1991) ====
The men's Scottish hockey National League 6 champions were the winners of the now defunct sixth-tier league in men's hockey in Scotland. The sixth league was created after the initial season split teams into six leagues of eight teams. The sixth league lasted until the 1978–79 season, after which the higher leagues moved from eight per league to ten per league. With not enough teams competing, a sixth league was no longer required. However, due to the increased number of entrants into the national leagues a sixth-tier was required again. It began again in the 1985–86 season but only lasted six seasons.

Season	Champions	Runners-up	Third place
1976–77	Menzieshill	Whitecraigs	Aberdeen University
1977–78	Aberdeen University	Whitecraigs	Anchor
1978–79	Whitecraigs	Bishopbriggs	Anchor
1979–85	No Competition		
1985–86	Greenock	Garthamlock/Poloc	Heriot Watt University
1986–87	Rosyth Fishheads	Grove	Irvine
1987–88	Monifieth	Motherwell	Heriot Watt University
1988–89	Rosyth Fishheads (2)	Clydebank TC	Irvine
1989–90	Irvine	Madras College FP	Garthamlock/Poloc
1990–91	Glasgow University	Garthamlock/Poloc	Heriot Watt University

Total titles won

- Clubs no longer active are denoted in italics

Club	Champions	Runners-up	Third place	Last Championship
Rosyth Fishheads	2	0	0	1988-89
Giffnock	1	2	0	1978-79
Irvine	1	0	2	1989-90
Aberdeen University	1	0	1	1977-78
Glasgow University'	1	0	0	1990-91
Greenock	1	0	0	1985-86
Menzieshill	1	0	0	1976-77
Monifieth	1	0	0	1987-88

=== Women ===
==== National League 3 (1982–2014) ====
Season	Champions
1982-1983	Glasgow Western 2
1983-1984	Boroughmuir
1984-1985	Carmuirs
1985-1986	Aberdeen Bon Accord
1986-1987	Kirkcaldy
1987-1988	Kelburne
1988-1989	Grove Ladies
1989-1990	Ayr
1990-1991	Kelburne (2)
1991-1992	Melrose
1992-1993	Menzieshill
1993-1994	Aberdeen Bon Accord (2)
1994-1995	Borders Selkirk
1995-1996	Bonagrass Grove 2nd XI
1996-1997	Watsonians
1997-1998	Dunfermline
1998-1999	MIM Edinburgh 2nd XI
1999-2000	Borders Selkirk (2)
2000-2001	Kelburne (3)
2001-2002	Trinity
2002-2003	GHK
2003-2004	Dundee Wanders
2004-2005	Highland
2005-2006	Waverley Inveresk Trinity (2)
2006-2007	Gordonians
2007-2008	Glasgow Univ
2008-2009	Waverley Inveresk Trinity (3)
2009-2010	Gordonians (2)
2010-2011	Glasgow Academicals
2011-2012	Glasgow Univ (2)
2012-2013	Gordonians (3)
2013-2014	Univ of St Andrews

==== National League 4 (1982–2005) ====
Season	Champions
1982-1983	Kirkcaldy
1983-1984	Aberdeen Bon Accord
1984-1985	Dalziel
1985-1986	Greenock
1986-1987	Ayr
1987-1988	Grove Ladies
1988-1989	Lenzie
1989-1990	Vale of Leven
1990-1991	Melrose
1991-1992	Menzieshill
1992-1993	Dundee High School FP
1993-1994	Merchants
1994-1995	RH Gymnasts II
1995-1996	Highland
1996-1997	Dunfermline
1997-1998	Glasgow Western
1998-1999	GHK
1999-2000	Glasgow Univ
2000-2001	Dundee Wanders
2001-2002	Watsonians 2nd XI
2002-2003	Forrester
2003-2004	Highland (2)
2004-2005	Granite City Wanderers
