= Scottish Hockey National League =

Scottish hockey league

- Sport: Field hockey
- Founded: 1975; 51 years ago
- Administrator: Scottish Hockey
- No. of teams: 12 (men's); 12 (women's)
- Country: Scotland
- Confederation: EHF (Europe)
- Most recent champions: St Andrews Univ (men); Aberdeen Univ (women)
- Promotion to: Premiership
- International cup: Euro Hockey League
- Website: Scottish Hockey

The Scottish Hockey National League formerly National League 2 is the second-tier league of hockey in Scotland. The leagues are overseen by Scottish Hockey.

== History ==
The national league system was founded in 1975 after competitive district hockey proved popular. An annual tournament pitted the top teams from each district against one another, and this eventually formed the basis of a national league system.

The 1974–75 season was the initial steps to form 'official' national leagues in 1975–76. Participating clubs played for league placement for next season. Clubs across Scotland were invited to participate in the National League, with clubs split into three leagues. At the end of the season, the teams were divided into six leagues of 8 teams.

The league changed its name from the National League 2 to the National League for the 2019–20 season but due to the COVID-19 pandemic the season was declared void.

== Current Teams ==
Men

The 12 clubs listed below will compete in the Men's National League during the 2025–26 season.

Club	Location
Dunfermline Carnegie	Dunfermline
Falkirk and Linlithgow	Falkirk
FMGM Monarchs (Note: This club is an amalgamation of a number of clubs that have appeared in the National League before)	Dundee
Glasgow University	Glasgow
Gordonians	Aberdeen
Granite City Wanderers	Aberdeen
Harris Academy	Dundee
Highland	Inverness
Kelburne	Paisley
Perthshire	Perth
Univ of Strathclyde	Glasgow

Women

The 12 clubs listed below will compete in the Women's National League during the 2025–26 season.

Club	Location
Dundee Wanderers	Dundee
Edinburgh	Edinburgh
ESM	Edinburgh
Fjordhus Reivers	Galashiels
Gordonians	Aberdeen
Granite City Wanderers	Aberdeen
Grove Menzieshill	Dundee
Kelburne	Paisley
Perthshire	Perth
Stirling University	Stirling
Stirling Wanderers	Stirling
Univ of Strathclyde	Glasgow

== Past winners ==
=== Men ===
Season	Champions	Runners-up	Third place	ref/notes
1975–76	Dunfermline Carnegie	Aberdeen	Waverley	
1976–77	Perthshire	Hazlehead	Stepps	
1977–78	Stepps	Ruthrieston	Hazlehead	
1978–79	Hazlehead	Ruthrieston	Dunfermline Carnegie	
1979–80	Gordonians	Clydesdale	Waverley	
1980–81	Dundee Wanderers	Waverley	Menzieshill	
1981–82	Menzieshill	Perthshire	Clydesdale	
1982–83	Uddingston	Watsonians	Hazlehead	
1983–84	Aberdeen GSFP	Hazlehead	Ruthrieston	
1984–85	Kelburne	Ruthrieston	Stirling	
1985–86	Inverleith	I.C.I. Grangemouth	Uddingston	
1986–87	Uddingston (2)	Hazlehead	Edinburgh University	
1987–88	Grange	Edinburgh University	Stirling	
1988–89	Aberdeen GSFP (2)	Stirling	Perthshire	
1989–90	Inverleith (2)	Perthshire	Edinburgh University	
1990–91	Hazlehead (2)	Stirling	Aberdeen GSFP	
1991–92	Clydesdale	Stepps	Aberdeen GSFP	
1992–93	Western	Hazlehead	Watsonians	
1993–94	Edinburgh University	Watsonians	Stepps	
1994–95	Clydesdale (2)	Uddingston	Stepps	
1995–96	Watsonians	Edinburgh University	Hazlehead	
1996–97	Clydesdale (3)	Stepps	Aberdeen GSFP	
1997–98	Edinburgh University (2)	Menzieshill	Harris	
1998–99	Watsonians (2)	Hazlehead	Harris	
1999–2000	Motherwell (2)	Inverleith	Harris	
2000–01	Edinburgh University (3)	Harris	MBC	
2001–02	Clydesdale (4)	Watsonians	Harris	
2002–03	Motherwell (2)	Watsonians	Harris	
2003–04	MIM Edinburgh	Harris	Hillhead	
2004–05	Clydesdale (5)	Hillhead	Watsonians	
2005–06	Watsonians (3)	Hillhead	Greenock	
2006–07	Uddingston (3)	Stepps	Granite City Wanderers	
2007–08	Stepps (2)	Edinburgh University	Uddingston	
2008–09	Stepps (3)	Waverley Inveresk	Uddingston	
2009–10	Cala Edinburgh (2)	Falkirk GHG	Dunfermline Carnegie	
2010–11	Cala Edinburgh (3)	Stepps	Watsonians	
2011–12	Gordonians (2)	Watsonians	Stepps	
2012–13	Dundee Wanderers (2)	Uddingston	Falkirk GHG	
2013–14	Uddingston (4)	Watsonians	St Andrews Univ	
2014–15	Grove Menzieshill (2)	Uddingston	St Andrews Univ	
2015–16	Watsonians (4)	Inverleith	Granite City Wanderers	
2016–17	Dundee Wanderers (3)	Inverleith	Dunfermline Carnegie	
2017–18	Gordonians (3)	Watsonians	Dunfermline Carnegie	
2018–19	Dundee Wanderers (4)	Dunfermline Carnegie	Inverleith	
2019–20	void due to COVID-19 pandemic			(Note: The 2019–20 Scottish Hockey Premiership was suspended in March 2020 due to the COVID-19 pandemic in Scotland. A points average was taken but no league winners were declared)
2020–21	void due to COVID-19 pandemic			(Note: The 2020–21 Scottish Hockey Premiership was not played due to the COVID-19 pandemic in Scotland)
2021–22	ESM	FMGM Monarchs	Univ of Strathclyde	
2022–23	Dundee Wanderers (5)	Grove Menzieshill	Glasgow University	
2023-24	Dunfermline Carnegie	Gordonians		
2024-25	St Andrews Univ	Kelburne	Gordonians	

==== Total titles won ====
Titles won by club (%)
1. Clydesdale – 5 (10.9%)
2. Dundee Wanderers – 5 (10.9%)
3. Uddingston – 4 (9.00%)
4. Watsonians – 4 (9.00%)
5. Cala Edinburgh – 3 (6.50%)
6. Edinburgh University – 3 (6.50%)
7. Stepps – 3 (6.50%)
8. Aberdeen Grammar FP – 2 (4.30%)
9. Dunfermline Carnegie – 2 (4.30%)
10. Gordonians – 2 (4.30%)
11. Granite City Wanderers (Note: Formerly known as Hazelhead) – 2 (4.30%)
12. Inverleith – 2 (4.30%)
13. Motherwell – 2 (4.30%)
14. Other clubs – 7 (15.2%)

Club	Champions	Runners-up	Third place	Last Championship
Clydesdale	5	1	1	2004-05
Dundee Wanderers	5	0	0	2022-23
Watsonians	4	7	3	2015-16
Uddingston	4	3	3	2013-14
Stepps	3	4	4	2008-09
Edinburgh University	3	3	2	2000-01
Cala Edinburgh	3	1	0	2010-11
Granite City Wanderers	2	5	4	1990-91
Inverleith	2	4	1	1989-90
Grove Menzieshill (Note: Formerly known as Menzieshill)	2	2	1	2014-15
Dunfermline Carnegie	2 (Note: Dunfermline Carnegie were top of the National League before the league was declared void due to the COVID pandemic, and therefore did not claim the title)	1	4	1975-76
Aberdeen GSFP	2	1	3	1988-89
Gordonians	2	0	1	2017-18
Motherwell	2	0	0	2002-03
Perthshire	1	2	1	1976-77
ESM	1	0	1	2021-22
Grange	1	0	0	1987-88
Kelburne	1	0	0	1984-85
Western	1	0	0	1992-93

=== Women ===
Season	Champions
1982-1983	Perthshire
1983-1984	Grange Western Wanderers
1984-1985	Perthshire (2)
1985-1986	Whitehill
1986-1987	Aberdeen Bon Accord
1987-1988	Kirkcaldy
1988-1989	Boroughmuir
1989-1990	Grove Ladies
1990-1991	Boroughmuir (2)
1991-1992	Kirkcaldy (2)
1992-1993	Grange Western Wanderers (2)
1993-1994	Boroughmuir (3)
1994-1995	Menzieshill
1995-1996	Aberdeen Bon Accord (2)
1996-1997	Melrose
1997-1998	Watsonians
1998-1999	Dunfermline
1999-2000	Watsonians (2)
2000-2001	Melrose (2)
2001-2002	Bonagrass Grove 2nd XI
2002-2003	Bonagrass Grove 2nd XI (2)
2003-2004	Bonagrass Grove 2nd XI (3)
2004-2005	Bonagrass Grove 2nd XI (4)
2005-2006	Hillhead
2006-2007	Dundee Wanderers
2007-2008	Haddington
2008-2009	Highland
2009-2010	Granite City Wanderers
2010-2011	GHK
2011-2012	Inverleith
2012-2013	Watsonians (3)
2013-2014	Hillhead (2)
2014-2015	ESM
2015-2016	Hillhead (3)
2016-2017	GHK (2)
2017-2018	Glasgow University
2018-2019	Gordonians
2019–1020	void due to COVID-19 pandemic
2020–1021	void due to COVID-19 pandemic
2021-2022	Inverleith (2)
2022-2023	St Andrews Univ
2023-2024	Fjordhus Reivers
2024-2025	Aberdeen University
