= Michael Watt (field hockey) =

Irish field hockey player (b. 1987)

Personal information
- Full name: Michael Watt
- Born: 13 April 1987 (age 39) Belfast, Northern Ireland
- Height: 178 cm (5 ft 10 in)
- Weight: 79 kg (174 lb)

Sport
- Sport: Field hockey
- Position: Forward
Youth career
- Years: Team
- 1998–2005: RBAI
Senior career
Years	Team	Caps	Goals
199x–2005	Instonians	-	-
2005–2009	Grange	-	-
2009–2010	KHC Dragons	-	-
2010–2012	RS Tenis	-	-
2012–2013	SCHC	-	-
2013–2015	Surbiton	-	-
2015–2016	Lisnagarvey	-	-
2016–2018	Hampstead & Westminster	-	-
2018–	Instonians	-	-
National team
Years	Team	Caps	Goals
2006–2016	Ireland	201	(54)
Medal record
Representing Ireland
EuroHockey Championships
Bronze medal – third place	2015 London

Michael Watt (born 13 April 1987) is a former Ireland men's field hockey international. Between 2006 and 2016 Watt made 201 appearances and scored 54 goals for Ireland. He was a member of the Ireland team that won the bronze medal at the 2015 Men's EuroHockey Nations Championship. He also represented Ireland at the 2016 Summer Olympics. At club level, Watt has won the Irish Senior Cup with Instonians, the Scottish Hockey Cup with Grange and the Men's Irish Hockey League with Lisnagarvey. He also played and scored for both Grange and Surbiton in the Euro Hockey League.

== Early years, family and education ==
Between 1998 and 2005 Watt attended the Royal Belfast Academical Institution. In addition to playing field hockey at RBAI, Watt also played rugby union for the school. Between 2005 and 2009 he attended Heriot-Watt University where he gained a BSc in Real Estate Management. His older brother, Johnny, a graduate of Trinity College Dublin, played rugby union for Ireland at schoolboy and university levels.

== Domestic teams ==
=== RBAI ===
In 2002–03, together with Mark Gleghorne, Watt was a member of the Royal Belfast Academical Institution team that won the Burney Cup and finished as runners-up in the All Ireland Schoolboys Hockey Championship. In 2003–04, together with Paul Gleghorne and John Jackson, he was a member of the RBAI team that won the McCullough Cup, the Burney Cup and the All Ireland Schoolboys Hockey Championship.

=== Instonians ===
Watts began playing for Instonians while still attending RBAI. In 2003–04, together with Mark and Paul Gleghorne, Watt was a member of the Instonians team that won the Irish Senior Cup, defeating Cork Harlequins 1–0 in the final. In 2018 Watt re-joined Instonians.

=== Grange ===
Between 2005 and 2009, while attending Heriot-Watt University, Watt played for Grange in the Scottish Hockey National League. He was a Grange player when he made his senior debut for Ireland. He also played and scored for Grange in the 2007–08 Euro Hockey League. In 2008–09 Watt scored 17 goals for Grange, including two in the Scottish Hockey Cup final as they defeated Inverleith 4–0. He was also named the Scottish Hockey Union Player of the Year.

=== KHC Dragons ===
During the 2009–10 season Watt played for KHC Dragons in the Men's Belgian Hockey League. Watt also helped coach KHC Dragons youth teams.

=== RS Tenis ===
Between 2010 and 2012 Watt played for RS Tenis in the División de Honor de Hockey Hierba. His team mates at RS Tenis included fellow Ireland international, Geoff McCabe. Watt also helped coach RS Tenis youth teams.

=== SCHC ===
During the 2012–13 season Watt played for SCHC in the Hoofdklasse. His team mates at SCHC included fellow Ireland international, Conor Harte. Watt also helped coach SCHC youth teams.

=== Surbiton ===
Between 2013 and 2015 Watt played for Surbiton in the Men's England Hockey League. He also played and scored for Surbiton in the 2013–14 Euro Hockey League.

=== Lisnagarvey ===
In 2015 Watt joined Lisnagarvey. In 2015–16, along with Jonathan Bell, Sean Murray and Paul Gleghorne, Watt was a member of the Lisnagarvey team that won the Men's Irish Hockey League and the EY Champions Trophy. Watt and Lisnagarvey also reached the final of the Irish Senior Cup but lost to Monkstown after a penalty shoot-out.

=== Hampstead & Westminster ===
Between 2016 and 2018 Watt played for Hampstead & Westminster in the Men's England Hockey League.

== Ireland international ==
Between 2006 and 2016 Watt made 201 appearances and scored 54 goals for Ireland. He made his senior debut for Ireland in July 2006, aged 19, against Poland. In his first major tournament, the 2008 Men's Field Hockey Olympic Qualifier, he scored twice in the opening 4–0 win against France. Watt was a member of the Ireland team that won the 2011 Men's Hockey Champions Challenge II. He also helped Ireland win Men's FIH Hockey World League tournaments in 2012 and 2015. Watt was also a member of the Ireland team that won the bronze medal at the 2015 Men's EuroHockey Nations Championship. He also represented Ireland at the 2016 Summer Olympics. He made his last appearance for Ireland at the 2016 Summer Olympics and in November 2017 he announced his official retirement from the team.

Tournaments	Place
2008 Men's Field Hockey Olympic Qualifier	4th
2009 Men's Hockey Champions Challenge II	2nd
2009 Men's Hockey World Cup Qualifiers	3rd
2011 Men's Hockey Champions Challenge II	1st
2011 Men's EuroHockey Nations Championship	5th
2012 Men's Field Hockey Olympic Qualifier	2nd
2012–13 Men's FIH Hockey World League Round 1	1st
2012 Men's Hockey Champions Challenge I	3rd
2012–13 Men's FIH Hockey World League Round 2	2nd
2012–13 Men's FIH Hockey World League Semifinals	7th
2013 Men's EuroHockey Nations Championship	6th
2014 Men's Hockey Investec Cup	2nd
2014–15 Men's FIH Hockey World League Round 2	1st
2014–15 Men's FIH Hockey World League Semifinals	5th
2015 Men's EuroHockey Nations Championship	3rd place, bronze medalist(s)
2016 Summer Olympics	10th

== Occupation ==
Between 2013 and 2018 Watt was based in the West End of London where he worked as a surveyor, firstly for the Central London Agency later for Matthews & Goodman. In 2018, together with his brother, Johnny, he returned to Belfast to work for Fred J. Malcolm, a jewellery firm.

== Honours ==
Ireland

- Men's FIH Hockey World League Round 1
  - Winners: 2012 Cardiff
- Men's FIH Hockey World League Round 2
  - Winners: 2015 San Diego
  - Runners up: 2013 New Delhi
- Men's Hockey Champions Challenge II
  - Winners: 2011
  - Runners up: 2009
- Men's Field Hockey Olympic Qualifier
  - Runners up: 2012
- Men's Hockey Investec Cup
  - Runners up: 2014

Lisnagarvey

- Men's Irish Hockey League
  - Winners: 2015–16: 1
- EY Champions Trophy
  - Winners: 2016: 1
- Irish Senior Cup
  - Runners up: 2015–16: 1

Grange

- Scottish Hockey Cup
  - Winners: 2008–09: 1

Instonians

- Irish Senior Cup
  - Winners: 2003–04: 1

RBAI

- All Ireland Schoolboys Hockey Championship
  - Winners: 2003–04: 1
  - Runners up: 2002–03: 1
- Burney Cup
  - Winners: 2002–03, 2003–04: 2
- McCullough Cup
  - Winners: 2003–04: 1
