= Callum Duke =

Scottish field hockey player

Personal information
- Born: 5 July 1990 (age 36) Glasgow, Scotland

Sport
- Sport: Field hockey
- Position: Defender
Senior career
Years	Team	Caps	Goals
–2008	Hillhead	-	-
2008–2013	Edinburgh Univ	-	-
2013–2014	Frankfurt 1880	-	-
2014–2021	Hillhead	-	-
2021–2023	Western Wildcats	-	-
National team
Years	Team	Caps	Goals
2012–2022	Scotland	102	-
Medal record
Representing Scotland
European Championship II
Bronze medal – third place	2015 Prague	Team

Callum Duke (born 5 July 1990) is a Scottish field hockey player who represented the Scottish national team at two Commonwealth Games.

== Biography ==
Duke was born in Glasgow and educated at Kelvindale Primary School and Cleveden Secondary School and studied at the University of Edinburgh.

Duke played club hockey for Hillhead in the Scottish Hockey National Leagues system but played for Edinburgh University Hockey Club while at university. Duke made his Scotland debut in 2012 against Spain in Barcelona, won a bronze medal with Scotland at the 2015 Men's EuroHockey Championship II in Prague and earned his 50th cap in 2016.

After university, he played a season in Germany before returning to Hillhead HC and became the club captain. He represented Scotland at the 2018 Commonwealth Games in Gold Coast, Australia, in the men's tournament and played for Scotland at the 2019 Men's EuroHockey Championship.

He left Hillhead for a second time to sign for Western Wildcats for the 2021/22 season. In 2022 he went to his second Commonwealth Games after being selected to represent Scotland at the 2022 Commonwealth Games in Birmingham, England, in the men's tournament.

In June 2023 he announced his retirement from international hockey after his 102nd cap against Switzerland.
