= 2012–13 Men's FIH Hockey World League Round 1 =

Field hockey tournament

The 2012–13 Men's FIH Hockey World League Round 1 was held from August to December 2012. A total of 35 teams competing in 9 events were part in this round of the tournament playing for 13 berths in the Round 2, played from February to June 2013.

== Qualification ==
Each national association member of the International Hockey Federation (FIH) had the opportunity to compete in the tournament. Teams ranked 17th and lower in the FIH World Rankings current at the time of seeking entries for the competition were allocated to one of the Round 1 events. The following 35 teams, shown with final pre-tournament rankings, competed in this round of the tournament.

- Austria (21)
- Azerbaijan (38)
- Bangladesh (40)
- Barbados (47)
- Belarus (31)
- Chile (25)
- Czech Republic (22)
- Egypt ( 24)
- Fiji (71)
- Ghana (37)
- Gibraltar (43)
- Guatemala
- Hong Kong (49)
- Ireland (15)
- Italy (28)
- Mexico (30)
- Morocco (60)
- Nigeria (70)
- Oman (36)
- Papua New Guinea (73)
- Poland (19)
- Portugal (50)
- Qatar
- Scotland (23)
- Singapore (32)
- Sri Lanka (46)
- Sweden (35)
- Thailand (59)
- Trinidad and Tobago (34)
- Turkey (55)
- Ukraine (26)
- United States (27)
- Vanuatu
- Venezuela (57)
- Wales (29)

== Prague ==
- Prague, Czech Republic, 17–19 August 2012.

=== Pool ===
All times are Central European Summer Time (UTC+02:00)

Team	Pld	W	WD	LD	L	GF	GA	GD	Pts
Poland	3	3	0	0	0	10	2	+8	9
Ukraine	3	1	1	0	1	8	12	−4	5
Belarus	3	1	0	0	2	6	8	−2	3
Czech Republic	3	0	0	1	2	6	8	−2	1

Advanced to Round 2

17 August 2012
14:45

Poland	5–0	Ukraine
Juszczak 5'; Gorny 22'; Hutek 33'; Bratkowski 35'; Makowski 57'	Report

Umpires:
Jakub Mejzlík (CZE)
Edward Hordzich (BLR)

17 August 2012
17:00

Czech Republic	1–2	Belarus
Jahoda 38'	Report	Radzivinovich 16', 62'

Umpires:
Francisco Lopez (ESP)
Vorodymr Lutsynkevych (UKR)

18 August 2012
14:45

Ukraine	5–4	Belarus
Polishchuk 7', 14', 41'; Ozerskyy 28', 61'	Report	Zyshchyk 20', 60'; Radzivinovich 53', 66'

Umpires:
Jakub Mejzlik (CZE)
Grzegorz Rysinski (POL)

18 August 2012
17:00

Czech Republic	2–3	Poland
Piterak 2'; Vacek 60'	Report	Juszczak 16', 64'; Strykowski 26'

Umpires:
Vasquez Lopez (ESP)
Edward Hordzich (BLR)

19 August 2012
14:45

Poland	2–0	Belarus
Juszczak 12'; Oszyjczyk 14'	Report

Umpires:
Volodymr Lutsynkevych (UKR)
Jakub Mejzlík (CZE)

19 August 2012
17:00

Ukraine	3–3 (a.e.t.)	Czech Republic
Ozerskyy 42', 54', 56'	Report	Perinka 6'; Bernatek 27'; Vacek 39'
Penalties
	3–2

Umpires:
Grzegorz Rysinski (POL)
Vasquez Lopez (ESP)

=== Awards ===
- Best Player: (Ukraine) Artem Ozerskyy
- Fair Play: Belarus

== Singapore ==
- Singapore, 31 August–2 September 2012.

=== Pool ===
All times are Singapore Standard Time (UTC+08:00)

Team	Pld	W	WD	LD	L	GF	GA	GD	Pts
Bangladesh	3	3	0	0	0	16	4	+12	9
Singapore	3	2	0	0	1	10	5	+5	6
Hong Kong	3	0	1	0	2	3	9	−6	2
Thailand	3	0	0	1	2	2	13	−11	1

Advanced to Round 2

31 August 2012
17:00

Bangladesh	6–1	Hong Kong
Rashel 9', 53'; Chayan 15', 62'; 52'; Hossain 55'	Report	Ali 45'

Umpires:
Eric Koh (MAS)
Kenny Tan (SIN)

31 August 2012
19:15

Singapore	6–0	Thailand
Yuhari 3', 7'; Abdullah 41'; Razak 46', 69'; Salim 50'	Report

Umpires:
Reza Salim (BAN)
Lee Leo (HKG)

1 September 2012
16:00

Hong Kong	1–1 (a.e.t.)	Thailand
Hin Y.C. 43'	Report	Promjinda 54'
Penalties
Singh (penalty shoot-out scored); Khan (penalty shoot-out scored); Bal (penalty shoot-out missed); Ahmed (penalty shoot-out scored); Ali (penalty shoot-out scored)	4–3	(penalty shoot-out missed) Vimuttanon; (penalty shoot-out missed) Thammueangkhun; (penalty shoot-out scored) Dejmaneethornchai; (penalty shoot-out scored) Sangtaweep; (penalty shoot-out scored) Limbanyen

Umpires:
Reza Salim (BAN)
Kenny Tan (SIN)

1 September 2012
18:15

Singapore	2–4	Bangladesh
Marican 26'; Salim 28'	Report	Chayan 10'; Hasan 35+'; Islam 59'; Rashel 66'

Umpires:
Eric Koh (MAS)
Noppadon Prompim (THA)

2 September 2012
16:00

Bangladesh	6–1	Thailand
Rashel 10', 44'; Kumir 11', 70'; Islam 24'; Hossain 52'	Report	Thammueangkhun 69'

Umpires:
Lee Leo (HKG)
Kenny Tan (SIN)

2 September 2012
18:15

Hong Kong	1–2	Singapore
Ahmed 47'	Report	Marican 44'; Razak 57'

Umpires:
Eric Koh (MAS)
Noppadon Prompin (THA)

=== Awards ===
- Best Player: (Singapore) Saifulnizam Md Seftu
- Best Goalkeeper: (Thailand) Authachai Soh-Tree

== Accra ==
- Accra, Ghana, 7–9 September 2012.

=== Pool ===
All times are Greenwich Mean Time (UTC±00:00)

Team	Pld	W	D	L	GF	GA	GD	Pts
Egypt	2	2	0	0	8	1	+7	6
Ghana	2	1	0	1	4	3	+1	3
Nigeria	2	0	0	2	0	8	−8	0

Advanced to Round 2

7 September 2012
18:15

Ghana	3–0	Nigeria
Blah 7'; Frimpong 49'; Baah 63'	Report

Umpires:
Francesco Parisi (ITA)
Sherif El Amery (EGY)

8 September 2012
18:15

Egypt	5–0	Nigeria
Elhady 3', 50'; Sayed 9'; Ghabran 49'; Ezz 67'	Report

Umpires:
Aziz Adimah (EGY)
Francesco Parisi (ITA)

9 September 2012
16:15

Ghana	1–3	Egypt
Sam 47'	Report	Mohamed 32'; Mohamed 54'; Ghabran 61'

Umpires:
Azura Garuba (NIG)
Francesco Parisi (ITA)

== Cardiff ==
- Cardiff, Wales, 7–9 September 2012.

=== Pool ===
All times are British Summer Time (UTC+01:00)

Team	Pld	W	WD	LD	L	GF	GA	GD	Pts
Ireland	3	3	0	0	0	18	1	+17	9
Austria	3	1	1	0	1	6	6	0	5
Wales	3	1	0	1	1	4	5	−1	4
Sweden	3	0	0	0	3	1	17	−16	0

Advanced to Round 2

7 September 2012
15:30

Austria	5–1	Sweden
Monghy 14', 66'; Korper 23'; Bele 29'; Stanzl 50'	Report	Lundqvist 34'

Umpires:
Warren McCully (IRL)
Jamie Hindle (WAL)

7 September 2012
18:00

Ireland	5–0	Wales
Jermyn 9'; Harte 12'; Bruton 43', 55'; Cockram 50'	Report

Umpires:
Dan Barstow (ENG)
Michael Eilmer (AUT)

8 September 2012
14:00

Austria	1–5	Ireland
Korper 55'	Report	Jermyn 9', 35', 64'; Harte 37'; Watt 58'

Umpires:
Dan Barstow (ENG)
Mikael Mattsson (SWE)

8 September 2012
18:30

Wales	4–0	Sweden
Shaw 13'; Brignull 49', 62'; Cornick 64'	Report

Umpires:
Michael Eilmer (AUT)
Warren McCully (IRL)

9 September 2012
12:00

Ireland	8–0	Sweden
Cockram 7'; Jermyn 12', 14'; Harte 45'; Watt 51', 55'; McConnell 69'; Caruth 70'	Report

Umpires:
Jamie Hindle (WAL)
Michael Eilmer (AUT)

9 September 2012
15:00

Wales	0–0 (a.e.t.)	Austria
	Report
Penalties
	3–4

Umpires:
Dan Barstow (ENG)
Warren McCully (IRL)

== Lousada ==
- Lousada, Portugal, 25–30 September 2012.

=== Pool ===
All times are Western European Summer Time (UTC+01:00)

Team	Pld	W	WD	LD	L	GF	GA	GD	Pts
Scotland	4	4	0	0	0	30	0	+30	12
Portugal	4	2	1	0	1	13	13	0	8
Gibraltar	4	1	1	1	1	7	11	−4	6
Italy	4	1	0	1	2	7	16	−9	4
Morocco	4	0	0	0	4	1	18	−17	0

Advanced to Round 2

25 September 2012
14:30

Gibraltar	1–0	Morocco
Casciaro 16'	Report

Umpires:
Francesco Parisi (ITA)
John Heron (SCO)

25 September 2012
16:45

Italy	2–4^{1}	Portugal
Moro 15'; Corsi 54'	Report	Mongiano 3'; Kodde 15'; Oliveira 51'; Silva 63'

Umpires:
Diego Estebanez (ESP)
Brian Buckley (GIB)

^{1} Match was suspended at half time because of bad weather. The final 35 minutes were played on Friday, 28 September 2012 at 11:00 local time.

26 September 2012
14:30

Scotland	9–0	Morocco
Stott 29', 66'; Byers 30'; Bain 31'; Grassick 42'; Forsyth 53'; Moodie 63'; Coultas 69'; Anderson 69'	Report

Umpires:
Francesco Parisi (ITA)
Ricardo Fernandes (POR)

26 September 2012
16:45

Gibraltar	3–3	Italy
Rammage 14'; Haveland 18'; Rodriguez 57'	Report	Melato 13'; Corsi 23'; Mura 67'
Penalties
	3–1

Umpires:
John Heron (SCO)
Abdellah Frananae (MOR)

27 September 2012
14:30

Gibraltar	0–5	Scotland
	Report	Ramagge 21'; Forsyth 44'; Bain 60'; Grassick 62'; Coultas 69'

Umpires:
Diego Estebanez (ESP)
Ricardo Fernandes (POR)

27 September 2012
16:45

Morocco	1–6	Portugal
Khalil 11'	Report	Santos 10', 69'; Silva 15', 22', 44'; Morais 69'

Umpires:
Brian Buckley (GIB)
John Heron (SCO)

29 September 2012
14:00

Italy	2–0	Morocco
Dussi 29'; Melato 59'	Report

Umpires:
Diego Estebanez (ESP)
Ricardo Fernandes (POR)

29 September 2012
16:15

Scotland	7–0	Portugal
Bain 7', 38'; Forsyth 8'; Nelson 15'; Byers 17'; Grassick 20'; Coultas 62'	Report

Umpires:
Brian Buckley (GIB)
Francesco Parisi (ITA)

30 September 2012
13:00

Italy	0–9	Scotland
	Report	Hall 16'; Scholefield 28', 69'; Forsyth 31', 58'; Moodie 39'; Coultas 44', 48'; Grassick 57'

Umpires:
Diego Estebanez (ESP)
Brian Buckley (GIB)

30 September 2012
15:30

Portugal	3–3	Gibraltar
Silva 28'; Morais 34'; Franco 68'	Report	Henwood 39'; Casciaro 46'; Rammage 50'
Penalties
	2–0

Umpires:
John Heron (SCO)
Francesco Parisi (ITA)

== Port of Spain ==
- Port of Spain, Trinidad and Tobago, 14–17 November 2012.

=== Pool ===
All times are Atlantic Standard Time (UTC−04:00)

Team	Pld	W	D	L	GF	GA	GD	Pts
Trinidad and Tobago	3	3	0	0	14	4	+10	9
Chile	3	2	0	1	12	6	+6	6
Barbados	3	1	0	2	14	9	+5	3
Venezuela	3	0	0	3	4	25	−21	0

Advanced to Round 2

14 November 2012
15:00

Chile	5–3	Barbados
Rodriguez 22', 41', 55'; Richter 25'; Gajardo 26'	Report	Thomas 29'; Warner 43'; Payne 55'

Umpires:
Gus Soteriades (USA)
Devin Hooper (GUY)

14 November 2012
17:00

Trinidad and Tobago	9–2	Venezuela
Grant 11', 17'; Toussaint 19', 40'; Legerton 20'; Pierre 21'; Daniel 34'; Campbell 51'; Scipio 70'	Report	Vargas 3'; Adrian 18'

Umpires:
Donovan Simmonds (BER)
Jamar Springer (BAR)

16 November 2012
17:00

Barbados	10–1	Venezuela
Franklin 11', 16', 47', 50'; Thomas 26', 59'; Forde 31', 36'; Holder 51'; Warner 61'	Report	Adrian 13'

Umpires:
Sebastien Bustamante (CHI)
Devin Hooper (GUY)

16 November 2012
19:00

Trinidad and Tobago	2–1	Chile
Henderson 35'; Scipio 38'	Report	Richter 63'

Umpires:
Gus Soteriades (USA)
Donovan Simmonds (BER)

17 November 2012
17:00

Chile	6–1	Venezuela
Richter 23', 59'; A. Berczely 26'; J. Berczely 30'; Rodriguez 49', 67'	Report	Castro 56'

Umpires:
Donovan Simmonds (BER)
Jamar Springer (BAR)

17 November 2012
19:00

Barbados	1–3	Trinidad and Tobago
Catlin 20'	Report	Moutte 27', 31'; 37'

Umpires:
Gus Soteriades (USA)
Devin Hooper (GUY)

== Chula Vista ==
- Chula Vista, United States, 16–18 November 2012.

=== Pool ===
All times are Pacific Standard Time (UTC−00:00)

Team	Pld	W	D	L	GF	GA	GD	Pts
United States	2	2	0	0	24	0	+24	6
Mexico	2	1	0	1	8	8	0	3
Guatemala	2	0	0	2	0	24	−24	0

Advanced to Round 2

16 November 2012
12:00

Mexico	8–0	Guatemala
Eguía Mata 15'; Báez Garduño 24', 70'; Esperón Barrón 27'; Valenciana Hernández 41', 69'; Vásquez García 43'; Carrillo García 52'	Report

Umpires:
Lance Sarabia (USA)
Gavin Caldecott (CAN)

17 November 2012
12:00

Guatemala	0–16	United States
	Report	Harris 8', 15', 33', 39'; Ginofli 10', 29', 65'; Holt 12', 20', 48'; Linney 17', 68'; Cunningham 43', 46'; Martinez 52'; Käppeler 61'

Umpires:
John Hrytsak (CAN)
Deric Leung (CAN)

18 November 2012
12:00

United States	8–0	Mexico
Ginofli 7', 55'; Harris 9', 22', 57'; Käppeler 11'; Sheridan 18'; Linney 49'	Report

Umpires:
John Hrytsak (CAN)
Deric Leung (CAN)

== Doha ==
- Doha, Qatar, 27 November–2 December 2012.

=== Pool ===
All times are Arabia Standard Time (UTC+03:00)

Team	Pld	W	D	L	GF	GA	GD	Pts
Azerbaijan	3	3	0	0	11	4	+7	9
Sri Lanka	3	1	0	2	12	10	+2	3
Oman	3	1	0	2	8	10	−2	3
Turkey	3	1	0	2	6	13	−7	3
Qatar	4	3	0	1	11	9	+2	9

Advanced to Round 2
Disqualified^{1}

27 November 2012
16:00

Sri Lanka	6–2	Turkey
Arachige 33', 59'; Mudiyanselage 44'; Tennakoon 50'; Mahroof 52'; Dharmarathna 55'	Report	Özel 38'; Açıkgöz 69'

Umpires:
Nazmi Kamarudin (MAS)
Kamiran (PAK)

28 November 2012
16:00

Azerbaijan	4–0	Turkey
Ali 11', 30'; Khalid 44'; Aziz 58'	Report

Umpires:
Nazmi Kamarudin (MAS)
Ibrahim Katir Al-Nafuli (OMA)

30 November 2012
16:00

Sri Lanka	3–4	Oman
Ranasingha 58'; Tennakoon 60'; Mahroof 62'	Report	Al-Nasseri 26', 46'; Al-Zadjali 32'; Al-Laun 51'

Umpires:
Birol Sahan (TUR)
Kamran Sharif (PAK)

1 December 2012
16:00

Azerbaijan	3–1	Oman
Balamiyev 25'; Aziz 56'; Khalid 60'	Report	Al-Shar 30'

Umpires:
Nazmi Kamarudin (MAS)
Birol Sahan (TUR)

2 December 2012
16:00

Oman	3–4	Turkey
Al-Saadi 11'; Al-Raisi 14'; Al-Shar 35'	Report	Danki 8'; Silanoğlu 16'; Kir 52'; Özkılıç 57'

Umpires:
Bandera (SRI)
Shahbazov Farid (AZE)

2 December 2012
18:00

Sri Lanka	3–4	Azerbaijan
Magiwala 19'; Dharmarathna 26'; Tennakoon 37'	Report	Balamiyev 24'; Ali 51'; Aziz 54'; Abdullah 66'

Umpires:
Kamran Sharif (PAK)
Nazmi Kamarudin (MAS)

^1–Qatar's results were officially deleted from the event due to an eligibility problem with some of its players.

27 November 2012
18:00

Azerbaijan	5–4	Qatar
Bakamiyev 28', 49'; Ali 40', 43', 65'	Report	Mohamad 21', 51', 54'; Ali Faraqat 57'

Umpires:
Birol Sahan (TUR)
Bandera (SRI)

28 November 2012
18:00

Oman	3–4	Qatar
Al-Shaaibi 21'; Al-Nasseri 55', 60'	Report	Stevenson Nayak 3', 37'; Abd Gaffar 29', 50'

Umpires:
Kamran Sharif (PAK)
Bandera (SRI)

30 November 2012
18:00

Turkey	0–1	Qatar
	Report	Stevenson Nayak 69'

Umpires:
Shahbazov Farid (AZE)
Ibrahim Katir Al-Nafuli (QAT)

1 December 2012
18:00

Qatar	2–1	Sri Lanka
Ali Rafaqat 11'; Abd Gaffar 30'	Report	Warnakula 41'

Umpires:
Ibrahim Katir Al-Nafuli (OMA)
Kamran Sharif (PAK)

== Suva ==
- Suva, Fiji, 8–15 December 2012.

=== Pool ===
All times are Fiji Summer Time (UTC+13:00)

Team	Pld	W	D	L	GF	GA	GD	Pts
Fiji	2	2	0	0	24	2	+22	6
Papua New Guinea	2	1	0	1	1	7	−6	3
Vanuatu	2	0	0	2	2	18	−16	0

Advanced to Round 2

9 December 2012
10:00

Fiji	7–0	Papua New Guinea
Dutta 18', 46', 57', 59'; Al. Smith 27', 30'; Ahtong 33'	Report

Umpires:
Ben Grant (NZL)
Steve Rogers (AUS)

10 December 2012
11:00

Papua New Guinea	1–0	Vanuatu
Tapo 32'	Report

Umpires:
James Stewart (AUS)
Alex Corrie (FIJ)

12 December 2012
15:00

Fiji	17–2	Vanuatu
Saqacala 3'; Dutta 7', 14', 16', 23', 26', 58', 66'; Mock 18', 35'; Smith 32', 41', 48', 58', 69', 70'; Smith 38'	Report	Toara 34', 57'

Umpires:
Steve Rogers (AUS)
James Stewart (AUS)
