= Glasgow University Hockey Club =

Scottish field hockey club

- Full name: Glasgow University Hockey Club
- League: Scottish Hockey National Leagues
- Founded: 1881 (as the GUAC)
- Home ground: Garscube Sports Complex, West of Scotland Science Park, Maryhill Road
- Website: Official website (men); Official website (women)

Glasgow University Hockey Club is a field hockey club that is based in Glasgow, Scotland. The club is owned by the University of Glasgow. The men's and women's teams play their matches at Garscube Sports Complex, West of Scotland Science Park, Maryhill Road. The men's section has six teams (two of which are indoors) and the women's section has nine teams (two of which are indoors).

== History ==
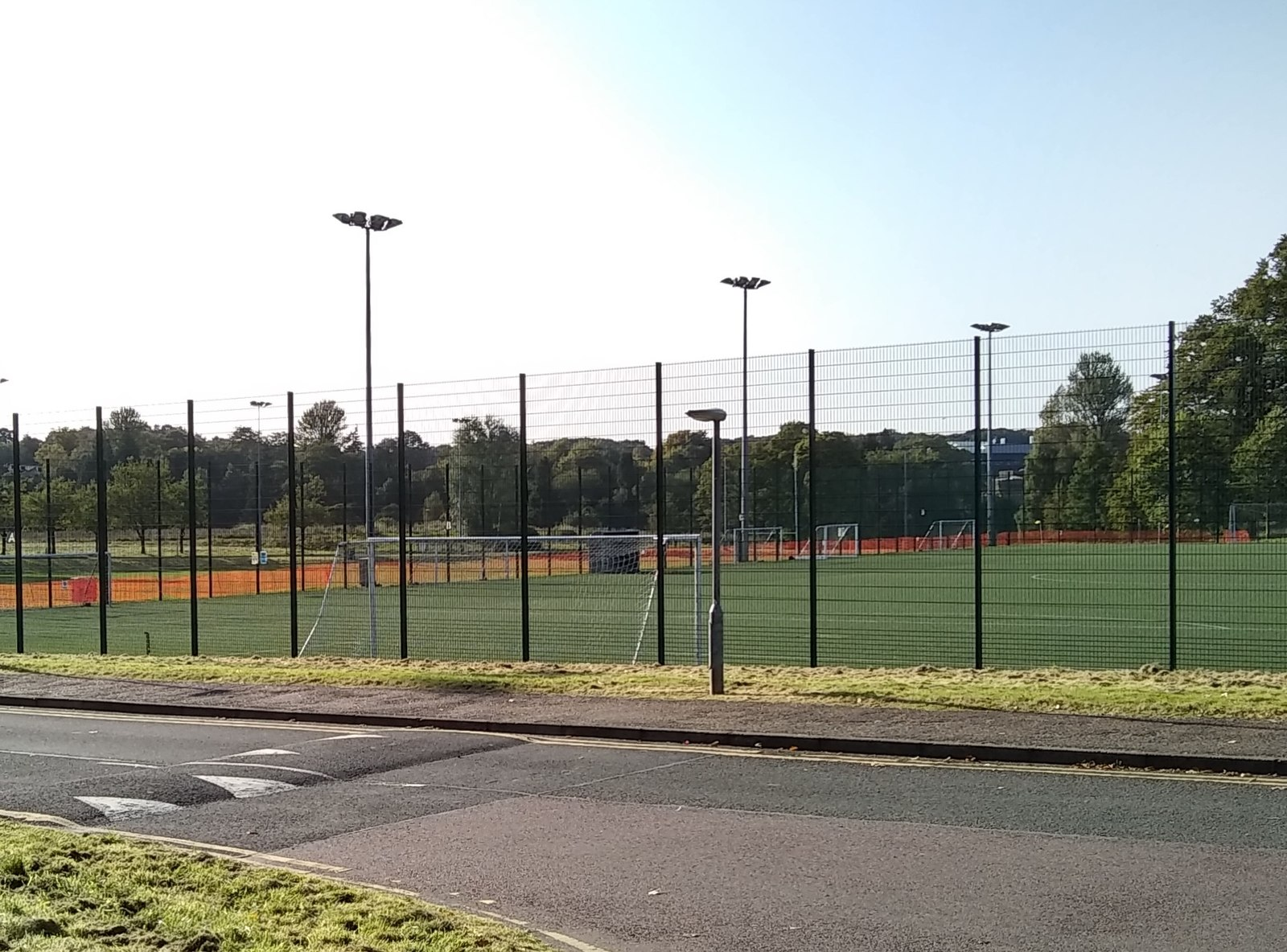
Garscube Sports Complex in 2020

The origins of hockey at the University of Glasgow began with the formation of the Glasgow University Athletic Club (GUAC) on 20 April 1881, when the Glasgow students' on the suggestion of Professor Bayley Balfour, followed the example set by University of Edinburgh in forming an official sporting organisation. Although the club did not have an official hockey team at the time the GUAC set up the foundations for all of the University sports.

The women's team are known to have existed by 1904, playing as Queen Margaret College, an institution that had previously merged into the University of Glasgow in 1892. Although the team were still called the Queen Margaret College Hockey club, they were also referred to as the Glasgow University Ladies'.

It is also known that a men's team were playing matches during 1906.

Both teams played their home fixtures at Westerlands (the Glasgow University Sports Ground at Anniesland), a venue that saw an expansion with a new pavilion that was opened in 1926. The Westerland Club House and playing fields on Ascot Avenue were sold for housing development in the 1990s.

The year of 1996 saw major changes, with new a new venue being acquired at the Garscube Sports Complex and GUAC being rebranded as the Glasgow University Sports Association (GUSA).

The men's teams progressed through the Scottish Hockey National Leagues system, from winning National League 6 in 1991, through to winning National League 3 in 2011. The women's team won National League 2 in 2018 and as of 2025 were playing in the highest tier in Scotland, the Scottish Hockey Premiership.

== Honours ==
Men

- 1978-1979 - NL5
- 1990-1991 - NL6
- 1991-1992 - NL5
- 2004-2005 - Scottish Plate
- 2006-2007 - NL3
- 2010-2011 - NL3

Women

- 1999-2000 - NL4
- 2007-2008 - NL3
- 2011-2012 - NL3
- 2017-2018 - NL2
- 2018-2019 - Scottish plate
