= Chris Sutherland =

Chris Sutherland may refer to:

- Chris Sutherland (footballer) (born 1995), English footballer
- Chris Sutherland (programmer) (fl. 1980s–2020s), English video game programmer and voice actor
- Chris Sutherland (field hockey) (born 1949), British field hockey player

== See also ==
- Christopher Sutherland, a character on Holby City
