= Gavin Byers =

Scottish field hockey player

Personal information
- Born: 23 December 1988 (age 37) Dundee, Scotland

Sport
- Sport: Field hockey
- Position: Midfielder
Senior career
Years	Team	Caps	Goals
2006–2013	Grove Menzieshill	-	-
2013–2014	Sheffield	-	-
2015–2018	Grove Menzieshill	-	-
2018–2021	Uhlenhorster HC	-	-
2021–2022	Grossflottbeker THGC	-	-
National team
Years	Team	Caps	Goals
–2022	Scotland	154	-
Medal record
Representing Scotland
European Championship II
Bronze medal – third place	2011 Vinnytsia	Team
Bronze medal – third place	2015 Prague	Team
Gold medal – first place	2017 Glasgow	Team
Silver medal – second place	2021 Gniezno	Team

Gavin Byers (born 23 December 1988) is a Scottish field hockey player who has represented Scotland at the 2018 Commonwealth Games.

== Biography ==
Byers was born in Dundee, Glasgow, and was educated at Hillside Primary and Menzieshill High School. Byers played club hockey for Grove Menzieshill Hockey Club in the Scottish Hockey Premiership.

He won a bronze medal with Scotland at the 2011 Men's EuroHockey Championship II in Vinnytsia, Ukraine and won another bronze medal at the 2015 Men's EuroHockey Championship II in Prague.

Byers spent a season with Melville City in Australia before returning to Grove Menzieshill. He won gold with Scotland at the 2017 Men's EuroHockey Championship II in Glasgow and participated in the Commonwealth Games hockey tournament at the 2018 Commonwealth Games in Gold Coast, Australia.

Byers also spent time playing in Hamburg, Germany, for Uhlenhorster HC and Grossflottbeker THGC and in 2021 he helped Scotland win the silver medal at the 2021 Men's EuroHockey Championship II in Gniezno, Poland.

After returning from Germany, Byers coached at Grove Menzieshill and the High School of Dundee and in 2023, he joined Scottish Hockey in a coaching capacity.
