= Aberdeen University Hockey Club =

Scottish field hockey club

- Full name: Aberdeen University Hockey Club
- League: Scottish Hockey National Leagues
- Founded: 1903
- Home ground: Aberdeen Sports Village, Linksfield Road
- Website: Official website (men); Official website (women)

Aberdeen University Hockey Club is a field hockey club that is based in Aberdeen, Scotland. The club is owned by the University of Aberdeen and based at the AUSA Students' Union on Elphinstone Road. The men's and women's teams play their matches at the Aberdeen Sports Village on Linksfield Road and the Hillhead Centre on Don Street.

The men's section has three teams and the women's section has seven teams.

== History ==
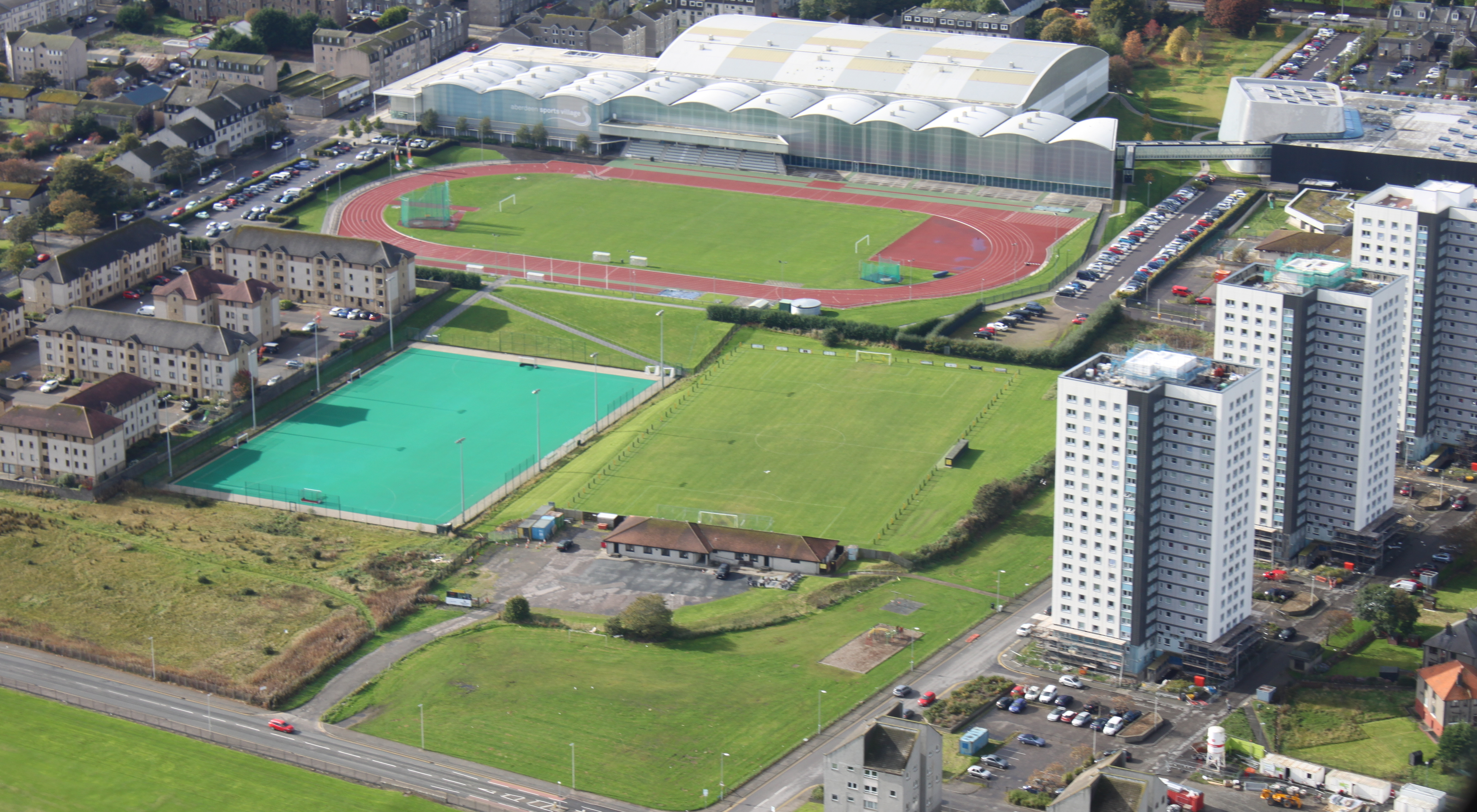
Aberdeen Sports Village in 2017

The origins of the hockey club can be traced back to the formation of the Aberdeen University Athletic Association (AUAA). The AUAA came about by a large gathering of students' at Marischal College, who met to create a constitution and form an organisation following the recent rent-free sports grounds that had been acquired. Although hockey was not one of the sports at this stage, it had paved the way for the introduction with a venue and committee in place.

The men's hockey club was formed in 1903 and it is also known that a ladies team was playing by 1904. In 1907, the club's captain W. G. McDonald was selected to represent Scotland against Ireland and several other players over the following decades earned international caps.

The men's teams progressed through the Scottish Hockey National Leagues system, from winning National League 6 in 1978, through to winning National League 3 in 2002. The women's team won the Scottish Hockey National League in 2025 and gained promotion to the highest tier in Scotland, the Scottish Hockey Premiership.

== Honours ==
Men

- 1977-1978 - NL6
- 2001-2002 - NL3

Women

- 2024-2025 - NL

== Notable players ==
=== Men's internationals ===
Extended content

Player	Events/Notes	Ref
(Scotland) Ronald Geddes	1932	
(Scotland) W. G. McDonald	1907	
(Scotland) Eric D. Watt	1953	

Key

- Oly = Olympic Games
- CG = Commonwealth Games
- WC = World Cup
- CT = Champions Trophy
- EC = European Championships

=== Women's internationals ===
Extended content

Player	Events/Notes	Ref
(Scotland) Ann Watson	1970	

Key

- Oly = Olympic Games
- CG = Commonwealth Games
- WC = World Cup
- CT = Champions Trophy
- EC = European Championships
