= FMGM Monarchs Hockey Club =

Scottish field hockey club

FMGM Monarchs
- Full name: FMGM Monarchs Hockey Club
- League: Scottish Hockey National Leagues
- Home ground: Mayfield Sports Centre, High School of Dundee, Arbroath Road
- Website: Official website

FMGM Monarchs Hockey Club are a Men's and Women's hockey club who play at the Mayfield Sports Centre in Dundee, Scotland.

== Amalgamation ==
Monarchs are an amalgamation of five "old" hockey clubs, who over time found it difficult to exist in their own right so came together to form Monarchs.

The constituent clubs are:

- Forfar Hockey Club
- Morgan Academy FP's Men's Hockey Club
- Grove Academy FP's Men's Hockey Club
- Dundee High School FP's Men's Hockey Club
- Monifieth High School FP's Men's Hockey Club

== History ==
Forfar Hockey Club was formed 1921 and Morgan Academy FP's Men's Hockey Club was formed on 14 September 1923. Morgan Academy FP won the Scottish Cup in 1963 and Grove Academy FP won the Scottish Cup in 1967.

Morgan Academy FP won National League 3 in 1984 and 1989. In between the two wins during May 1985, the Monifieth High School FP's Hockey Club was formed.

In September 1995, Grove Academy FP men and Dundee High School FP men merged to become Grove DHS and won National League 3 that season (1995/1996).

Monarchs won their first National Title in 2012: National League Division 4 indoor - with a record of played 10, won 8, one draw and one defeat. They finished the league 11 points clear of Glasgow Uni in 2nd place.

In 2022, the men's first XI achieved the club's best feat to date after earning promotion to the Scottish Hockey Premiership.

The men's team won the Scottish Plate in 2022 and 2023 and as of 2025 played in the Scottish Hockey National League (the second highest tier in Scotland).

== Honours ==
- 1962-1963 Scottish Cup winners (Morgan Academy FP)
- 1966-1967 Scottish Cup winners (Grove Academy FP)
- 1983-1984 National League 3 winners (Morgan Academy FP)
- 1984-1985 National league 4 winners (Dundee High School FP)
- 1986-1987 National league 4 winners (Dundee High School FP)
- 1987-1988 National league 6 winners (Monifieth HSFP)
- 1988-1989 National League 5 winners (Monifieth HSFP)
- 1988-1989 National League 3 winners (Morgan Academy FP)
- 1992-1993 National league 4 winners {Dundee High School FP) Women
- 1993-1994 National league Plate winners {Dundee High School FP) Women
- 1995-1996 National League 3 winners (Grove DHS)
- 2021-2022 Scottish Plate winners (FMGM Monarchs)
- 2022-2023 Scottish Plate winners (FMGM Monarchs)
