= Steven McIlravey =

Scottish field hockey player

Personal information
- Born: 15 July 1995 (age 31) Dundee, Scotland

Sport
- Sport: Field hockey
- Position: Goalkeeper
Senior career
Years	Team	Caps	Goals
2013	Harris Academy FP	-	-
2016–2025	Grove Menzieshill	-	-
National team
Years	Team	Caps	Goals
2016–	Scotland	4	-

Steven McIlravey (born 15 July 1995) is a Scottish field hockey player who has represented Scotland at the 2018 Commonwealth Games.

== Biography ==
McIlravey was born in Dundee, Scotland, and was educated at Harris Academy.

McIlravey played club hockey for Grove Menzieshill Hockey Club in the Scottish Hockey Premiership and worked in catering at a Dundee casino. He played for the Scottish U18 and U21 before taking part in the 2016 EuroHockey Trophy.

While at Grove Menzieshill, he participated in the Commonwealth Games hockey tournament at the 2018 Commonwealth Games in Gold Coast, Australia. His selection came late, after Scotland's second goalkeeper David Forrester was ruled out of the Games with a shoulder injury.

McIlravey also represented Scotland indoors. In 2025, he joined HPC Hockey as a coach.
