= University of St Andrews Hockey Club =

Scottish field hockey club

- Full name: University of St Andrews Hockey Club
- League: National Leagues; BUCS Championships
- Founded: 1905
- Home ground: University Park, St Leonard's Road

Personnel
- Owner: University of St Andrews
- Website: Official website

University of St Andrews Hockey Club owned by the University of St Andrews, is a field hockey club that is based in University Park, St Leonard's Road, St Andrews, Scotland. Both the men's and women's teams compete in the Scottish Hockey National Leagues system and as of 2025 played in the highest tier in Scotland, the Scottish Hockey Premiership. The teams also compete in the British Universities and Colleges Sport (BUCS) Championships.

== History ==
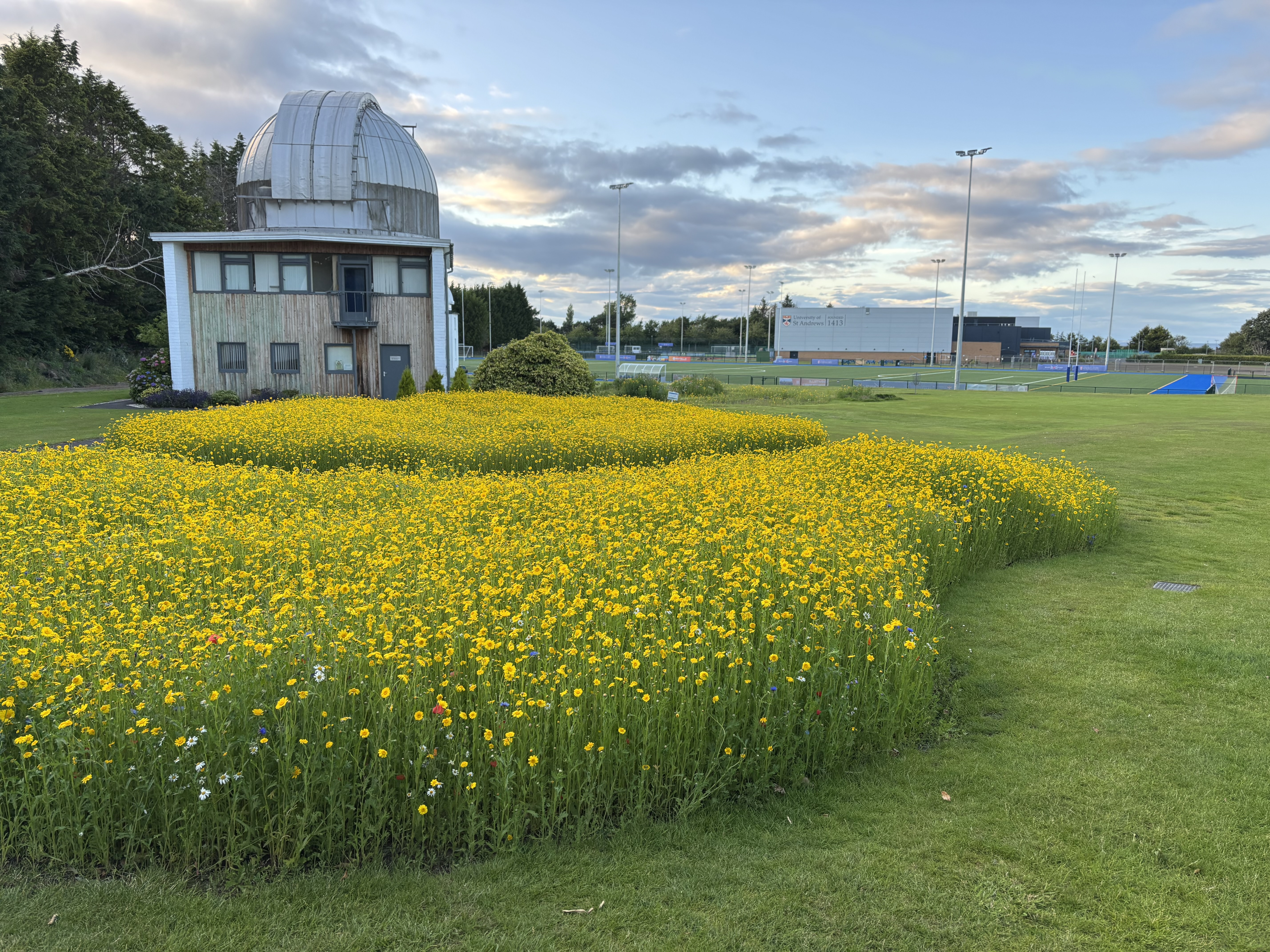
The sports grounds can be seen to the right of the Observatory

The club was founded in 1905 when the new pavilion was opened in what was then known as Rathelpie Park, and which at the time was also a venue for association football matches. The pavilion was constructed with funds donated by philanthropist Andrew Carnegie.

In 1907, the club was a founding member of the Midlands District Association and Rathelpie Park would soon be referred to as Carnegie Park.

The team of 1920–21 season were both Inter-Varsity and Midland League champions and by the late 1920s, a second XI was firmly established and the home venue was known as University Park.

In recent years both the men's and women's teams have progressed through the league pyramid; the men winning League 3 in 2009 and as of 2025 competing in the Scottish Hockey Premiership, while the women's team won the National League in 2023 and were promoted to the Premiership.

== Honours ==
- 1920–21 Inter-Varsity and Midland League (men)
- 1989–1990 - National League 5 (men)
- 2000–2001 - National League 3 (men)
- 2008–2009 - National League 3 (men)
- 2013–2014 - National League 3 (women)
- 2022–2023 - National League (women)

== Notable players ==
=== Men's internationals ===
Extended content

Player	Events	Notes/Ref
(Scotland) D. E. Innes	1922-1924	
(Scotland) J. D. M. Hardie	1922-1924	
(Scotland) Ian Edward Jones	1960s	
(Scotland) A. S. Roy	1931	

Key

- Oly = Olympic Games
- CG = Commonwealth Games
- WC = World Cup
- CT = Champions Trophy
- EC = European Championships
