= Uddingston Hockey Club =

Scottish field hockey club

- Full name: Uddingston Hockey Club
- League: Scottish Hockey National Leagues
- Founded: 1925/1975
- Home ground: Uddingston HC, Bothwell Castle Policies, Castle Avenue
- Website: Official website

Uddingston Hockey Club is a field hockey club that is based in Uddingston, on the north side of the River Clyde, south-east of Glasgow, Scotland, and play their matches at the Uddingston Hockey Club, next to the Bothwell Castle Cricket Ground on Castle Avenue. The men's section has five teams and the women's section has four teams. Additionally there is a junior section and a section called walking hockey.

== History ==
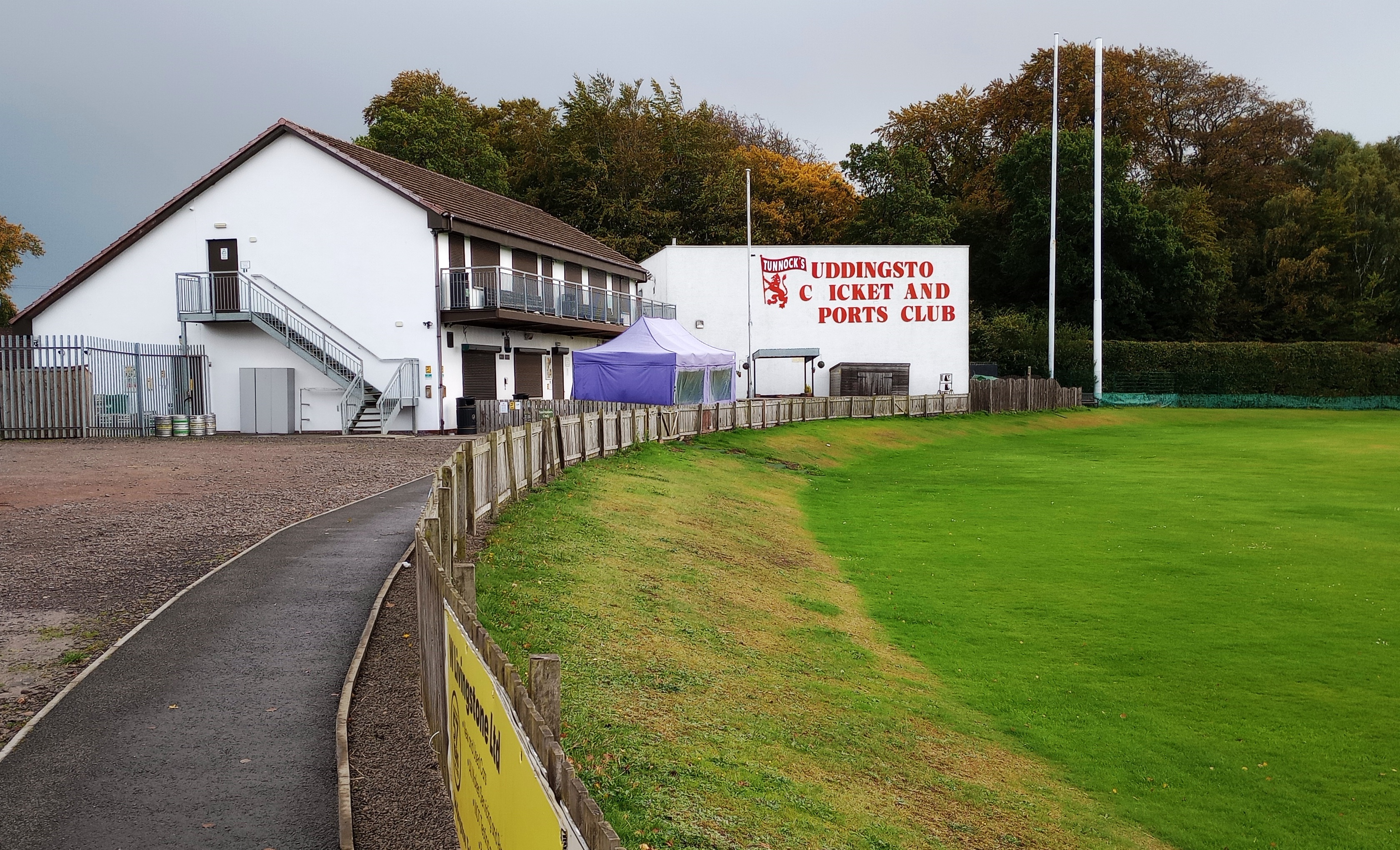
The clubhouse

Although the club was officially founded in 1975 it has much older roots. The origins of the Bellshill Hockey Club can be traced back to 1925, when the Bellshill Academy Former Pupils Hockey Club (which had been around since approximately 1920) decided to officially form a new club which was open to anyone and not just former pupils.

The club played at Hattonrigg Road but then in the 1950s took over premises at Belziehill Golf Club after the golf club closed. In 1967 the hockey club moved to its current location at the Uddingston Cricket and Sport Club and in 1975 changed its name to Uddingston Hockey Club, although the indoor team played under the name of Brooks Wishaw for sponsorship reasons.

The men's team won National League 3 in 1978 and 2005 and National League 2 in 1983, 1987, 2007 and 2014 and as of 2025 compete in the Scottish Hockey Premiership.

The women's team won the Scottish Plate in 2023 and as of 2025 compete in the Scottish Hockey Premiership.

In 2026 the men's team made it to the Scottish Premiership European playoffs for the first time in their history. However they went on to lose 5-0 to Edinburgh University in the semi finals on the 2nd of May.
