= Scottish Hockey Men's Indoor National Division 1 =

Scottish Hockey Men's Indoor National League Division 1
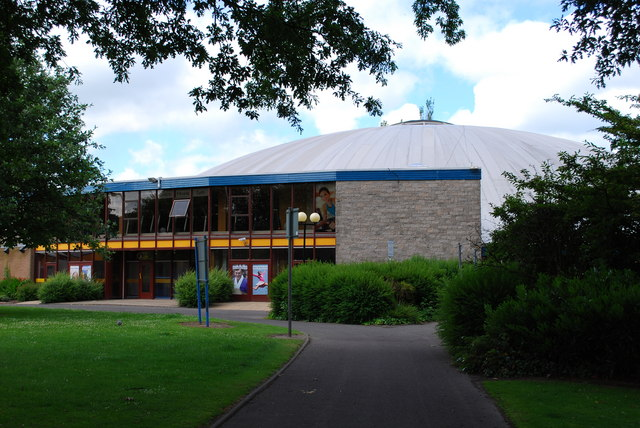
- First season: 1984/1985
- Administrator: Scottish Hockey Union
- Competitors: 8
- Country: Scotland
- Most recent champion: Western Wildcats Hockey Club
- Most titles: Menzieshill (21 titles)
- 2022/2023

The Men's Indoor National League Division 1 is the top tier of men's indoor hockey in Scotland. The winners are crowned Scottish Hockey indoor champions and represent Scotland in the EHF Eurohockey Indoor Club Championships.

The league runs from December to February every year. It comprises eight teams, with each playing the others once in a round robin format, followed by a split into two divisions comprising the top half and bottom half of the league. A further round of games is played in these divisions. The top two teams in the top half division meet in a grand final to determine the league winner. The bottom two teams in the bottom half division play in a relegation playoff to determine relegation to National League Division 2.

All eight teams meet at a central venue with most matches being played on a Saturday at Bell's Sports Centre. Other venues include Dundee International Sports Centre and the PEAK Centre in Stirling.

== Past winners ==
Season	Champions	Runners Up
1984-85	Menzieshill	Unknown
1985-86	Menzieshill	Unknown
1986-87	Unknown	Unknown
1987-88	Unknown	Unknown
1988-89	Edinburgh Civil Service	Unknown
1989-90	Menzieshill	Unknown
1990-91	Menzieshill	Unknown
1991-92	Menzieshill	Unknown
1992-93	Menzieshill	Unknown
1993-94	MIM	Unknown
1994-95	Menzieshill	Unknown
1995-96	Menzieshill	Unknown
1996-97	Menzieshill	Unknown
1997-98	Menzieshill	Unknown
1998-99	Dundee Wanderers	Unknown
1999-00	Dundee Wanderers	Unknown
2000-01	Menzieshill	Unknown
2001-02	Dundee Wanderers	Unknown
2002-03	Dundee Wanderers	Unknown

Season	Champions	Runners Up
2003-04	Menzieshill	Unknown
2004-05	Menzieshill	Unknown
2005-06	Menzieshill	Unknown
2006-07	Menzieshill	Unknown
2007-08	Menzieshill	Unknown
2008-09	Menzieshill	Unknown
2009-10	Menzieshill	Unknown
2010-11	Inverleith	Unknown
2011-12	Menzieshill	Inverleith
2012-13	Menzieshill	Inverleith
2013-14	Inverleith	Menzieshill
2014-15	Inverleith	Menzieshill
2015-16	Inverleith	Menzieshill
2016-17	Menzieshill	Inverleith
2017-18	Inverleith	Kelburne
2018-19	Western	Menzieshill
2019-20	Inverleith	Menzieshill
2020-21	Cancelled due to COVID-19 Pandemic	
2021-22	Western	Inverleith
2022-23	Western	Inverleith
2023-24	Western	Inverleith

== Wins by Club ==
Five different clubs have won the Scottish Indoor National League Division 1 title. The first title was won by Menzieshill in 1984/85. The most recent new winner was Western Wildcats in 2018/19.

Title wins per club
Year of first title	No of titles	Club
1984/85	21	Menzieshill
1988/89	2	Edinburgh Civil Service/MIM
1998/99	4	Dundee Wanderers
2010/11	6	Inverleith
2018/19	4	Western Wildcats

== European Titles ==
Three clubs playing in the Scottish men's top flight have won European Indoor Club titles, all in the second tier 'B' Division. Scottish men's club sides have also competed in the top tier 'A' Division on eleven occasions, with the highest placings being third for Edinburgh Civil Service (1990) and fourth for Menzieshill (2008).

European Indoor Title Wins
Year	Division	Location	Club
1993	Eurohockey Indoor Club Trophy (B Division)	(Switzerland) Basel	Menzieshill
1995	Eurohockey Indoor Club Trophy (B Division)	(Scotland) Edinburgh	Edinburgh Civil Service/MIM
1999	Eurohockey Indoor Club Trophy (B Division)	(Czech Republic) Prague	Menzieshill
2001	Eurohockey Indoor Club Trophy (B Division)	(Netherlands) Rotterdam	Dundee Wanderers
