= Chris Sutherland (field hockey) =

British field hockey player

Personal information
- Born: December 1949 (age 76)

Sport
- Sport: Field hockey
- Position: Forward
Senior career
| Years | Team | Caps | Goals |
| 1968–1980 | Edinburgh Civil Service | - | - |
| 1980–1982 | Klein Zwitzerland | - | - |
| 1982–1983 | De Kieviten | - | - |
| 1984–1986 | Edinburgh Civil Service | - | - |
National team
| Years | Team | Caps | Goals |
| 1971–1978 | Great Britain | 23 | - |
| 1969– | Scotland | | - |
Medal record
Field hockey
Representing Great Britain
Champions Trophy
| Bronze medal – third place | 1978 Lahore | Team competition |

Christopher Sutherland (born December 1949) is a former British and Scottish hockey international. He played for Great Britain and Scotland and was selected for the 1976 Summer Olympics.

== Biography ==
Sutherland was educated at Leith Academy, where he started playing hockey.

Sutherland played his club hockey for Edinburgh Civil Service, where he won multiple Scottish titles and captained the Scottish schoolboys in 1968. He earned his first Scottish cap at the age of 19 after being called up for the match against Ireland on 29 March 1969. He made his Great Britain debut on 8 May 1971. Sutherland also excelled at athletics and finished second in the 400 metres hurdles in the 1973 Scottish Athletics League.

Sutherland created some controversy during his career and was suspended and warned about his future conduct in 1974. He also missed the chance to play at the 1976 Summer Olympics after the British team were denied a place despite being called up as a late replacement and then being stood down again.

Sutherland received further suspensions for his conduct in 1977 but was part of the bronze medal-winning Great Britain team that competed at the inaugural 1978 Men's Hockey Champions Trophy, in Lahore, Pakistan.

He missed out on selection for the 1980 Summer Olympics, partly due to recovery from a hand injury and more likely due to his disciplinary record and was the first player from Scotland to play in Europe after joining Klein Zwitzerland in the Netherlands for the start of the 1980 season.
