= Erskine Stewart's Melville Hockey Club =

Scottish field hockey club

ESM
- Full name: Erskine Stewart's Melville Hockey Club
- League: Scottish Hockey National Leagues
- Founded: 1987
- Home ground: Stewart's Melville College Hockey Pavilion, E Fettes Avenue
- Website: Official website

Erskine Stewart's Melville Hockey Club or ESM for short is a field hockey club that is based in the north of Edinburgh, Scotland and play their matches at Stewart's Melville College Hockey Pavilion on E Fettes Avenue. They are located very close to Inverleith Hockey Club. The men's section has four teams and the women's section has three teams. Additionally there is junior section.

== History ==
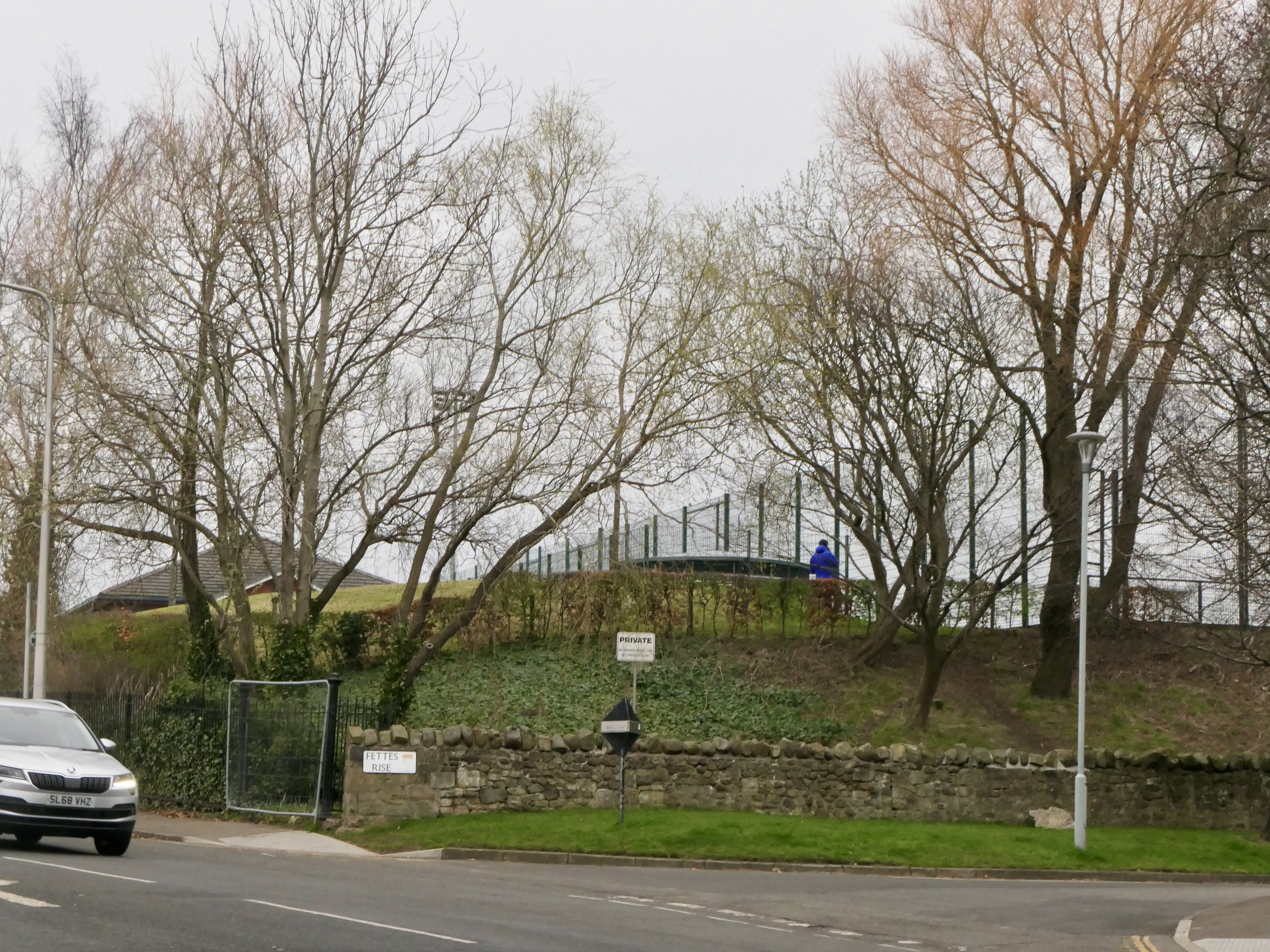
The clubhouse and pitch on East Fettes Avenue

The club was formed in 1987 as the Erskine Stewart's Melville Former Pupils Hockey Club, giving the opportunity to former pupil's of the boys' school Stewart's Melville College to continue playing hockey after leaving school, although initially pupils also played for the club. The club grew and during the 1990s toured England and Ireland before taking a European trip to Amsterdam and Brussels in 1996, the same season that they won the East of Scotland title.

In 2000, the club opened up to the girls' school The Mary Erskine School, with the club forming a ladies' section and the team experienced success in the district divisions.

The men's team won National League 3 in 2013 and 2019 and National League 2 in 2022 and as of 2025 play in the Scottish Hockey Premiership.

The women's team won National League 2 in 2015.
