= Dan Coultas =

Scottish field hockey player

Personal information
- Born: 22 August 1989 (age 36) Beverley, England

Sport
- Sport: Field hockey
- Position: Defender
Senior career
Years	Team	Caps	Goals
2008–2012	Durham Unv	-	-
2012–2013	Cannock	-	-
2013–2015	Holcombe	-	-
2015–2017	Edinburgh Univ	-	-
2017–2020	Grange	-	-
2020–2025	Watsonians	-	-
National team
Years	Team	Caps	Goals
2011–2021	Scotland	71	-
2014–2021	Great Britain	3	-
Medal record
Representing Scotland
European Championship II
Bronze medal – third place	2011 Vinnytsia	Team
Bronze medal – third place	2015 Prague	Team
Silver medal – second place	2021 Gniezno	Team

Daniel Coultas (born 22 August 1989) is a Scottish former field hockey player who represented the Scotland men's national field hockey team at the 2014 Commonwealth Games, in addition to playing for Great Britain.

== Biography ==
Coultas was educated at Driffield Junior School and Driffield School and studied at Durham University and the University of Edinburgh.

While at university he played for Durham University Hockey Club in the Men's England Hockey League and won a bronze medal with Scotland at the 2011 Men's EuroHockey Championship II in Vinnytsia, Ukraine.

He then played for Cannock Hockey Club and Holcombe Hockey Club respectively. While at Holcombe in 2014, he received his first GB cap, was selected as a member of Team Scotland that competed in the men's tournament at the 2014 Commonwealth Games in Glasgow and won another bronze medal at the 2015 Men's EuroHockey Championship II in Prague.

Shortly after the Prague bronze, he started a master's degree at Edinburgh, and subsequently played for Edinburgh University Hockey Club in the Scottish Hockey Premiership before moving on to Grange Hockey Club after finishing his degree. In July 2020, he joined Watsonian Hockey Club as a player/coach and in 2021 he helped Scotland win the silver medal at the 2021 Men's EuroHockey Championship II in Gniezno, Poland.

As of 2025, he was a physical education teacher at George Watson's College and was a coach with HPC Hockey.
