= GHK Hockey Club =

Scottish field hockey club

- Full name: GHK Hockey Club
- League: Scottish Hockey National Leagues
- Home ground: High School of Glasgow sports grounds Anniesland/Crow Road,
- Website: Official website

GHK Hockey Club (Glasgow High Kelvinside) is a field hockey club that is based at the High School of Glasgow sports grounds (known as Old Anniesland), north-east Glasgow, Scotland. Both the men's and women's sections have six teams.

== History ==
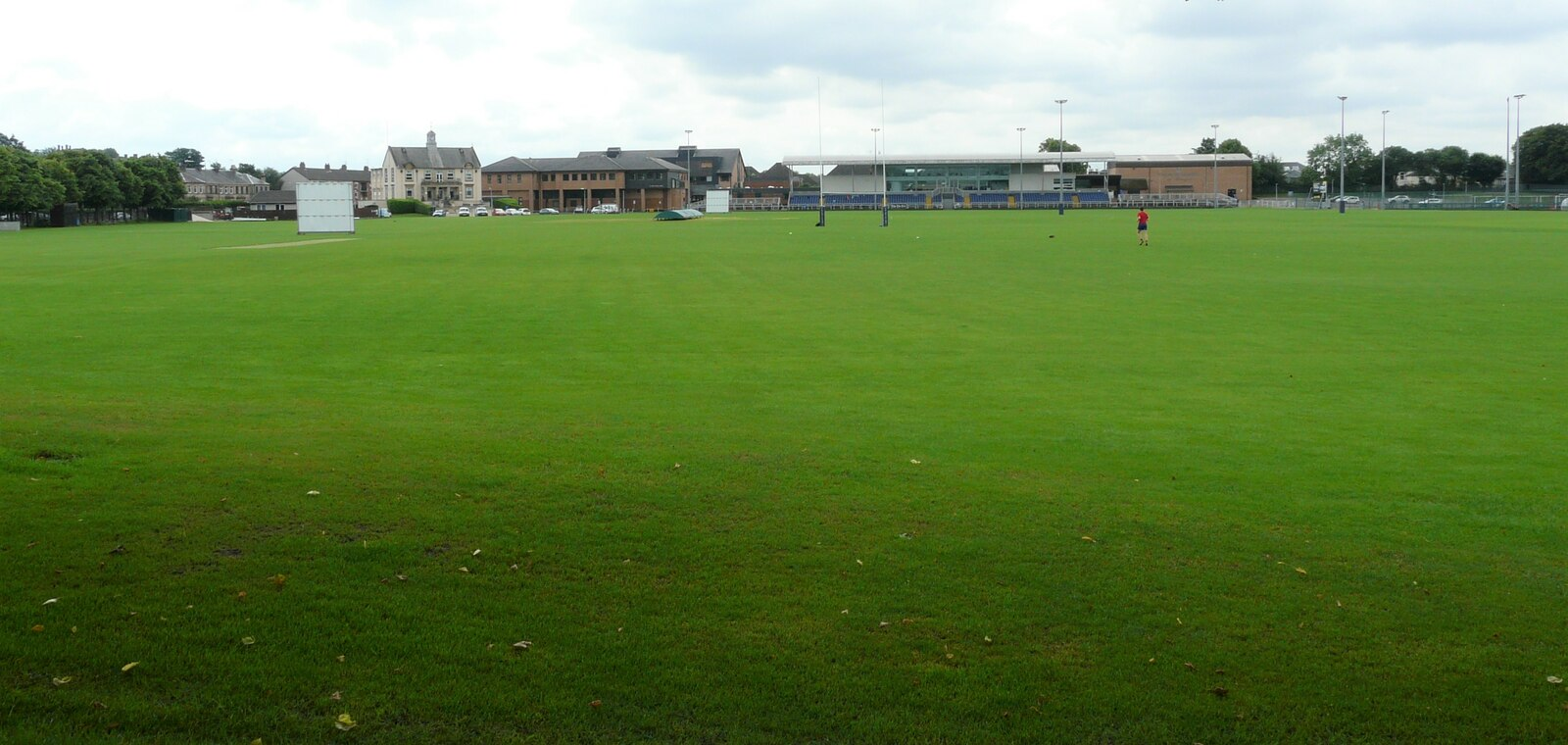
The playing field of Old Anniesland

The hockey club is part of a group of sports (including rugby and cricket) organised by the GHK Sports Clubs, which was formed in 1982, following a sports merger of Kelvinside Academy and High School of Glasgow.

The men's section had a different path to the women's club in that they only became part of GHK in 2000. They were originally called the Cochrane Park Hockey Club (formed in 1899) and throughout their history had played at venues such as Milliken Park in Johnstone and Linwood Sports centre in Paisley. In 2000, they took the name GHK Cochrane Park. A further merger took place when the Clydebank Technical College Hockey Club or Clydebank TC as it was known, joined the GHK umbrella.

The women's team progressed through the Scottish National Leagues pyramid, winning National 4 in 1999 through to National 2 in 2017. As of 2025 they play in the highest tier of Scottish hockey, the Scottish Hockey Premiership.

== Honours ==
- 1982-1983 - National League 4 (men) as Cochrane Park
- 1991-1992 - National League 4 (men) as Clydebank TC
- 1996-1997 - National League 4 (men) as Cochrane Park
- 1998-1999 - National League 4 (women)
- 2002-2003 - National League 3 (women)
- 2010-2011 - National League 2 (women)
- 2016-2017 - National League 2 (women)
