= Dundee Wanderers Hockey Club =

Scottish field hockey club

- Full name: Dundee Wanderers Hockey Club
- League: Scottish Hockey National Leagues
- Founded: 1934
- Home ground: Mayfield Sports Centre, High School of Dundee, Arbroath Road
- Website: Official website

Dundee Wanderers Hockey Club is a field hockey club that is based at the Mayfield Sports Centre, High School of Dundee in Dundee. The club's men's section has five teams and the women's section has three teams. Additionally there are indoor teams, a junior section and a Masters team.

== History ==
The club was formed as a men's only club in 1934, when Dundee based players that were part of the Dundee Newport Hockey Club were effectively forced to leave. It was he first club to be unconnected to a school or college and the name Wanderers originates from the nomadic status during the early years of the club. Early venues included Graham Street and Caird Park and the club secretary was Jack S. Ireland.

During World War II the club suffered closure but in 1946 it was revived and the following year J.Brown was elected president.

The men's team won National League 2 in 1981 but their first major honour arrived during the 1992-1993 season, when the team became champions of Scotland. As a consequence the team were honoured with a civic reception.

The women's team won quick promotions, winning National League 3 in 2004 and National League 2 in 2007, with their highest honour to date coming in 2012, when they finished runner-up in the highest tier.

The men's team won the second tier of the Scottish league again in 2013, 2017, 2019 and 2023.

== Honours ==
Scottish champions: Men

- 1992–93

== Notable players ==
=== Men's internationals ===
Extended content

Player	Events	Notes/Ref

Key

- Oly = Olympic Games
- CG = Commonwealth Games
- WC = World Cup
- CT = Champions Trophy
- EC = European Championships

=== Women's internationals ===
Extended content

Player	Events	Notes/Ref
		)

Key

- Oly = Olympic Games
- CG = Commonwealth Games
- WC = World Cup
- CT = Champions Trophy
- EC = European Championships
