= Clydesdale & Clydesdale Western Hockey Club =

Scottish field hockey club

- Full name: Clydesdale & Clydesdale Western Hockey Club
- League: Scottish Hockey National Leagues
- Home ground: Clydesdale Cricket Club, Beaton Road
- Website: Official website

Clydesdale & Clydesdale Western Hockey Club is a field hockey club that is based at the Clydesdale Cricket Club in Glasgow. The club's men's section has five teams and is known as Clydesdale Hockey Club, while the women's section has six teams and is known as Clydesdale Western Hockey Club. Additionally there is junior section.

== History ==
The history of the club starts in 1902 with the formation of Cartha Hockey Club.

In 1960 Cartha moved to Clydesdale Cricket Club in search of a better playing surface and changed their name to Clydesdale Hockey Club. In 1983, the club held an international match between Scotland and Ireland which is believed to have possibly been the last international game in Scotland played on grass, although the club do accept that it is not certain that it was the last.

In 1997 a new artificial pitch was completed and the clubhouse was opened in June 1998.

A new junior section was created in August 2009 and indoor sessions has been held ever since at Shawlands Academy.

A major development took place in May 2010, when the Glasgow Western Ladies Hockey Club voted to merge with the Clydesdale Ladies section. Glasgow were the most successful women's club in Scottish Hockey having won the Scottish title known as National League 1 at the time on 19 occasions from 1983 to 2006. Under their new name of Clydesdale Western Ladies, they secured another league title in 2014.

The current venue has hosted international matches, such as the 2021 three match series of Scotland against Ireland.

== Honours ==
Scottish champions: Women

- 1982-1983 Glasgow Western Ladies
- 1983-1984 Glasgow Western Ladies
- 1984-1985 Glasgow Western Ladies
- 1985-1986 Glasgow Western Ladies
- 1986-1987 Glasgow Western Ladies
- 1987-1988 Glasgow Western Ladies
- 1988-1989 Glasgow Western Ladies
- 1989-1990 Glasgow Western Ladies
- 1990-1991 Glasgow Western Ladies
- 1991-1992 Glasgow Western Ladies
- 1992-1993 Glasgow Western Ladies
- 1993-1994 Glasgow Western Ladies
- 1994-1995 Glasgow Western Ladies
- 1995-1996 Glasgow Western Ladies
- 1998-1999 Glasgow Western Ladies
- 1999-2000 Glasgow Western Ladies
- 2001-2002 Glasgow Western Ladies
- 2002-2003 Glasgow Western Ladies
- 2005-2006 Glasgow Western Ladies
- 2013-2014 Clydesdale Western Ladies

== Notable players ==
=== Men's internationals ===
Extended content

Player	Events	Notes/Ref
(Scotland) George M. Currie	1922	
(Scotland) Errol T. Marsh	1932	

Key

- Oly = Olympic Games
- CG = Commonwealth Games
- WC = World Cup
- CT = Champions Trophy
- EC = European Championships

=== Women's internationals ===
Extended content

Player	Events	Notes/Ref
(Scotland)		

Key

- Oly = Olympic Games
- CG = Commonwealth Games
- WC = World Cup
- CT = Champions Trophy
- EC = European Championships
