= Grove Menzieshill Hockey Club =

Scottish field hockey club

- Full name: Grove Menzieshill Hockey Club
- League: Scottish Hockey National Leagues
- Founded: 1922/1969/2010
- Home ground: Dawson Park, Caenlochan Road
- Website: Official website

Grove Menzieshill Hockey Club is a field hockey club that is based at the Forthill Community Sports Club in Dundee, Scotland but play their matches at Dawson Park. The club runs nine adult teams and eight junior teams.

== History ==
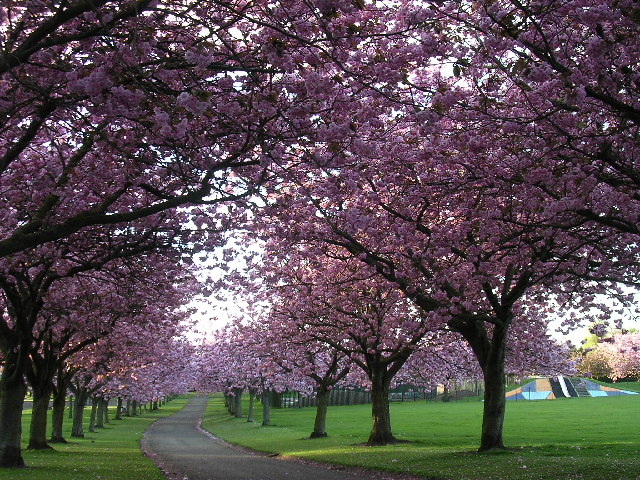
Dawson Park

Although the official founding of the club starts in 1922 with the formation of Grove Academy Ladies Former Pupils Hockey Club, the team played before 1922. A Grove Ladies team took part in the annual women's tournament in 1919.

The early days of the club consisted of players that were former pupils of Grove Academy and the team would play with the suffix F.P. for many decades. The Academy part of the name was dropped but even after World War II the F.P part of the name was retained before finally being dropped and simply called Grove Ladies.

In 1969 a men's club called Menzieshill Hockey Club was founded based out of Menzieshill Community Centre.

Both the women's Grove Ladies and men's Menzieshill HC embarked on a period of success, with the latter becoming champions of Scotland after winning the league title in both the 1985–86 and 1988–89 seasons. Meanwhile Grove Ladies secured three successive promotions and divisional titles from national League 4 to National League 2, from 1988 to 1990, entering the highest division for the first time in 1991.

In 1993 Grove Ladies Hockey Club played under the new of Bonagrass Grove due to sponsorship. The sponsorship was from a company called Bona Grass who manufactured synthetic yarns for sports surfaces' The following year in 1994, Menzieshill celebrated their 25th anniversary.

Bongrass Grove became the women's champions of Scotland for the first time in 2001 and won six more league titles from 2004 to 2010. Their domination was such that the women's 2nd XI were four times winners of the National League 2 from 2002 to 2005.

In 2010, Menzieshill Hockey Club and Bonagrass Grove merged to become the club that it is today and Grove Menzieshill women's first team won three more titles during the 2010-2011, 2011-2012 and 2012-2013 seasons.

== Honours ==
Scottish champions:

Men

- 1985–1986 (as Menzieshill HC)
- 1988–1989 (as Menzieshill HC)

Women

- 2000-2001 (as Bongrass Grove HC)
- 2003-2004 (as Bongrass Grove HC)
- 2004-2005 (as Bongrass Grove HC)
- 2006-2007 (as Bongrass Grove HC)
- 2007-2008 (as Bongrass Grove HC)
- 2008-2009 (as Bongrass Grove HC)
- 2009-2010 (as Bongrass Grove HC)
- 2010-2011
- 2011-2012
- 2012-2013

== Notable players ==
=== Men's internationals ===
Extended content

Player	Events	Notes/Ref
(Scotland) Gavin Byers	CG (2018)	
(Scotland) Cameron Golden		
(Scotland) Steven McIlravey	CG (2018)	

Key

- Oly = Olympic Games
- CG = Commonwealth Games
- WC = World Cup
- CT = Champions Trophy
- EC = European Championships

=== Women's internationals ===
Extended content

Player	Events	Notes/Ref
(Scotland) Sue Fraser	Oly (1992)	
(Scotland) Alison Ramsay	Oly (1992)	
(Scotland) Pauline Robertson	Oly (2000)	

Key

- Oly = Olympic Games
- CG = Commonwealth Games
- WC = World Cup
- CT = Champions Trophy
- EC = European Championships
