= Gordonians Hockey Club =

Scottish field hockey club

- Nickname: Gordonians
- Founded: 1911 (115 years ago)
- Ground: Robert Gordon's College Playing Fields, Countesswells
- League: Scottish Hockey National Leagues
- Website: Official website
Home colours

Gordonians Hockey Club is a field hockey club based in west Aberdeen, Scotland. They play their matches at Countesswells, which is also the home to Gordonians RFC. The men's section has five teams and the women's section has five teams. Additionally, there are various junior teams.

== History ==
Gordonians Hockey Club was formed in 1911 to provide former pupils of Robert Gordon's College with the opportunity to continue playing hockey after their school years and to maintain contact with each other. Although it was initially an exclusive club for former pupils, Gordonians now have an open membership policy as well as ladies and youth teams. Gordonians continue to enjoy a strong relationship with the school and benefit from the use of the excellent hockey facilities at Countesswells where two pitches were laid in 2004 – one water-based and one sand-based.

Gordonians played in friendly matches until the North District Leagues were formed in the 1960s. The 1st XI was invited to join the newly formed National Leagues in 1976, and was placed in Division 3. In 1979, they won the division in their third season and then won Division 2 the following season, and held their place in Division 1 of the National Leagues from 1980/81 to 2008/09 - a record 29 seasons.

Although Gordonians have not yet become Scottish champions, the 1st XI came within one point of the Scottish Championship in 1996 and were runners-up again in 1998. They have, however, had considerable success in cup competitions having won the Scottish Cup 4 times and as a result represented Scotland in the European Cup Winners Cup in Poznan (1994), The Hague (1996), Rome (1998), and Eindhoven (2002). Gordonians also took part in the inaugural European Cup Winners Cup in Barcelona in 1990, having finished as runners up in the 1989 Scottish Cup to the league champions that year.

In May 2001, Gordonians merged with Merlins Ladies Hockey Club to form a combined club. Merlins Gordonians won the Scottish Districts Cup in 2005 and elected to move up from the North District League to the National League 3 in 2005/6. They won NL3 in only their second season in 2007, 2010 and 2013 and went on to win NL2 in 2019.

The club runs a successful youth coaching programme with around 90 boys and girls attending Tuesday coaching sessions, and competing in national competitions at various age levels.

== Honours ==
=== Men's 1st XI ===
European Cup Winners Cup Bronze Medal, 'A/B' Division – 1990 (Barcelona) Silver Medal, B Division – 1994 (Poznan) 7th Place, A Division – 1996 (The Hague) 6th Place, B Division – 1998 (Rome) 7th Place, A Division – 2002 (Eindhoven)

Scottish Cup WINNERS – 1993, 1995, 1997, 2001.

SHU National League Division 2 CHAMPIONS – 1980, 2012, 2018

SHU National League Division 3 CHAMPIONS – 1979

=== Men's 2nd XI ===
Scottish District Cup WINNERS 1984, 1988, 1989, 1995, 1996, 2000, 2001, 2011

Scottish District Champions Cup WINNERS 1989 (no longer competed for)

Regional League (North) CHAMPIONS 2000, 2001, 2002, 2004, 2005, 2008, 2010, 2011

North District Division 1 CHAMPIONS 1977, 1986, 1987, 1989, 1990, 1991, 1992, 1993, 1994, 1995, 1996, 1997

=== Men's 3rd XI ===
Scottish Reserve Cup WINNERS 1996, 1997, 2000, 2001, 2002, 2008

North District Division 1 CHAMPIONS 1998, 2000, 2001, 2002, 2004, 2006, 2009, 2010

North District Division 2 CHAMPIONS 1988

North District Division 3 CHAMPIONS 1973, 1975

=== Men's 4th XI ===
Scottish Reserve Plate WINNERS 2008

North District Division 1 CHAMPIONS 2007, 2008

North District Division 3 CHAMPIONS 1989
