= Watsonian Hockey Club =

Scottish field hockey club

- Full name: Watsonian Hockey Club
- League: Scottish Hockey National Leagues
- Founded: 1924
- Home ground: George Watson's College, Tipperlinn Road
- Website: Official website

Watsonian Hockey Club is a field hockey club that is based at the George Watson's College in Edinburgh. The club's men's section has seven teams, as does the women's section. Additionally there is large junior section.

== History ==
Founded in 1924, the club were initially affiliated to the Eastern District Hockey Association. The women's section was founded eight years later in 1932 by Dr Norah Campbell and Mrs K. K. Weatherhead.

In 1938, the annual meeting was held at Myreside Pavilion and E. Richardson was elected Honorary President. Many members were recruited from former pupils of the George Watson's College, an association which still exists.

The men's team won National League 3 in 1982 and again in 1991 before improving and winning National League 2 four times in 1996, 1999, 2006 and 2016. The women's team won successive promotions, winning National League 3 in 1997 and National League 2 in 1998 and further National League 2 wins came in 2000 and 2013.

From 2021 to 2025, the women's first XI became the dominant force in Scotland, winning four consecutive Scottish Hockey Premiership titles.

During the 2024–25 season, the men's first XI finished in their highest ever position when they secured third place in the Scottish Hockey Premiership.

== Honours ==
Scottish champions: Women

- 2021–2022
- 2022–2023
- 2023-2024
- 2024–2025

== Notable players ==
=== Men's internationals ===
Extended content

Player	Events	Notes/Ref
(Scotland) Dan Coultas	EC (2021)	

Key

- Oly = Olympic Games
- CG = Commonwealth Games
- WC = World Cup
- CT = Champions Trophy
- EC = European Championships

=== Women's internationals ===
Extended content

Player	Events	Notes/Ref
(Scotland) Norah Campbell	c.1930/40s	

Key

- Oly = Olympic Games
- CG = Commonwealth Games
- WC = World Cup
- CT = Champions Trophy
- EC = European Championships
