= Edinburgh Hockey Club =

Scottish field hockey club

- Full name: Edinburgh Hockey Club
- League: Scottish Hockey National Leagues
- Founded: 1958; 67 years ago
- Home ground: Meggetland Sports Complex, Colinton Road
- Website: Official website

Edinburgh Hockey Club also known as Cala Edinburgh for sponsorship reasons, is a field hockey club that is based at the Meggetland Sports Complex in Edinburgh, Scotland. The club was founded in 1958. The club runs two men's adult teams, six adult women's teams, four boys teams and three girls teams.

== History ==
During the 1950s, Inverleith Hockey Club members decided that Edinburgh needed more field hockey clubs. A letter was sent to Civil service employees and subsequently the Edinburgh Civil Service Hockey Club was formed. Another Edinburgh club Broughton F.P. was also formed around the same time. Two pitches were obtained at Muirhouse and the first A.G.M. was held in March 1958 in St. Andrew's House, with the first fixture following in September 1958.

Edinburgh Civil Service won the inaugural Scottish Hockey National League in 1975–76 and went on to win it eleven times in the first 13 years.

From 1980 to 2005 they were also known as Murray International Metals (MIM) due to sponsorship reasons and later played as Cala Edinburgh from 2013, again due to sponsorship from Cala Homes.

== Honours ==
- Scottish champions:
- 1975–76
- 1976–77
- 1977–78
- 1978–79
- 1979–80
- 1980–81
- 1981–82
- 1983–84
- 1984–85
- 1986–87
- 1987–88

== Notable players ==
=== Men's internationals ===
Extended content

Player	Events	Notes/Ref
(Scotland) Billy McLean	Oly (1980), CT (1978, 1980)	
(Scotland) Chris Sutherland	CT (1978)	

Key

- Oly = Olympic Games
- CG = Commonwealth Games
- WC = World Cup
- CT = Champions Trophy
- EC = European Championships

=== Women's internationals ===
Extended content

Player	Events	Notes/Ref
(Scotland) Ellen Paterson	1980	

Key

- Oly = Olympic Games
- CG = Commonwealth Games
- WC = World Cup
- CT = Champions Trophy
- EC = European Championships
