= Falkirk and Linlithgow Hockey Club =

Scottish field hockey club

- Full name: Falkirk and Linlithgow Hockey Club
- League: Scottish Hockey National Leagues
- Founded: 1933
- Home ground: Linlithgow Academy, Braehead Road; Grangemouth High School, Tinto Drive
- Website: Official website

Falkirk and Linlithgow Hockey Club is a field hockey club that is based in Falkirk, Scotland and play at Linlithgow Academy on Braehead Road and Grangemouth High School on Tinto Drive. The club's men's section has four teams and the women's section has three teams. Additionally there are indoor teams, a Masters team and a junior section.

== History ==
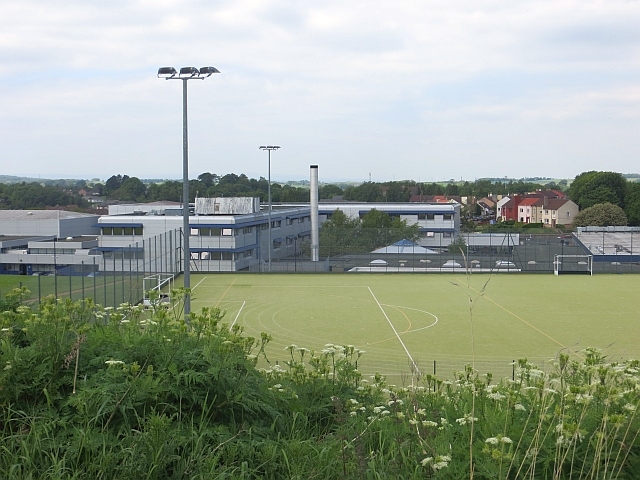
Linlithgow Academy in 2014

The history of the club is littered with mergers and name changes that bring the club to the name that it goes by today.

The clubs that merged over the years were -

- Scottish Dyes Hockey Club
- ICI Grangemouth
- Grangemouth Hockey Club
- Graeme High School Former Pupils Hockey Club
- Falkirk GHG
- BP Ladies
- Grangemouth Ladies
- Linlithow Ladies

It all started with the founding of the Scottish Dyes Hockey Club, born out of the Grangemouth Scottish Dyes Works that were set up in 1919. Several sources state the club was founded in 1933 but it is known that the Scottish Dyes Ladies Hockey Club of Grangemouth was formed in 1931 and it is worth noting that a Grangemouth Hockey Club seems to have existed previously too.

The 1933 date appears to be in regard to the formation of the Scottish Dyes Recreation Club, that included a new clubhouse and hockey pitch, which attracted both a men's and women's team to use the facilities.

The club received a £20 grant to purchase a set of orange and green strips (two of the colours of the main dyes used in the factory). In 1935, J.S. Boyd was elected president.

Following the resumption of serious hockey after World War II, a men's 2nd XI was added and in 1949 the club (both men's and women's sections) took the name ICI Grangemouth Hockey Club because Scottish Dyes parent company was Imperial Chemical Industries.

Tours and league hockey ensued for the men's club but there is some confusion as to what happened to the ICI Grangemouth ladies section because it seems to disappear soon after changing its name. However, in the 1970s a club called BP Ladies were playing at the British Petroleum (BP) complex in Grangemouth and it is not known if there was a connection, although it is relevant because the BP Ladies would eventually become part of the current club.

Men's club player Charles Donald was selected for the 1968 Summer Olympics and during the 1970s the men's section was to go on to field up to 7 teams and the men's first XI recorded their best season to date with a second place finish in National League 1.

In 1987 Graeme High School Former Pupils Hockey Club was formed by a small group of former ICI Grangemouth players to give an opportunity to pupils of their former School to play hockey. This led to an amalgamation of the two clubs in 1999, calling themselves Graeme High and Grangemouth Hockey Club for just one season before at the 2000 Annual General Meeting it was agreed on the name Falkirk GHG Hockey Club from 2000.

Meanwhile, slightly earlier in 1998, BP Ladies moved to train at a new astroturf pitch at Linlithgow Leisure Centre and play their matches at the astroturf pitch at Bathgate Sports Centre. They would change their name to Grangemouth Ladies and then Linlithgow Ladies Hockey Club in April 2003.

Falkirk GHG regularly finished in the top half of National League 3 from until 2008 when they were promoted to National league 2 and finished runner-up in 2013 and during the 2016/17 season, Linlithgow Ladies became East District Premier Division champions for the first time.

In May 2017, Falkirk GHG, Linlithgow Ladies and Linlithgowshire Juniors merged to become Falkirk & Linlithgow Hockey Club.

== Notable players ==
=== Men's internationals ===
Extended content

Player	Events	Notes/Ref
(Scotland) Charles Donald	Oly (1968)	

Key

- Oly = Olympic Games
- CG = Commonwealth Games
- WC = World Cup
- CT = Champions Trophy
- EC = European Championships
