= Hillhead Hockey Club =

Scottish field hockey club

- Full name: Hillhead Hockey Club
- League: Scottish Hockey National Leagues
- Founded: 1970
- Home ground: Top Windyedge, Ryvra Road
- Website: Official website

Hillhead Hockey Club is a field hockey club that is based in the north-west of Glasgow, Scotland and play their matches at Top Windyedge on Ryvra Road but have their clubhouse on Chamberlain Road, Jordanhill. The men's section has eight teams and the women's section has five teams. Additionally there is a junior section.

== History ==
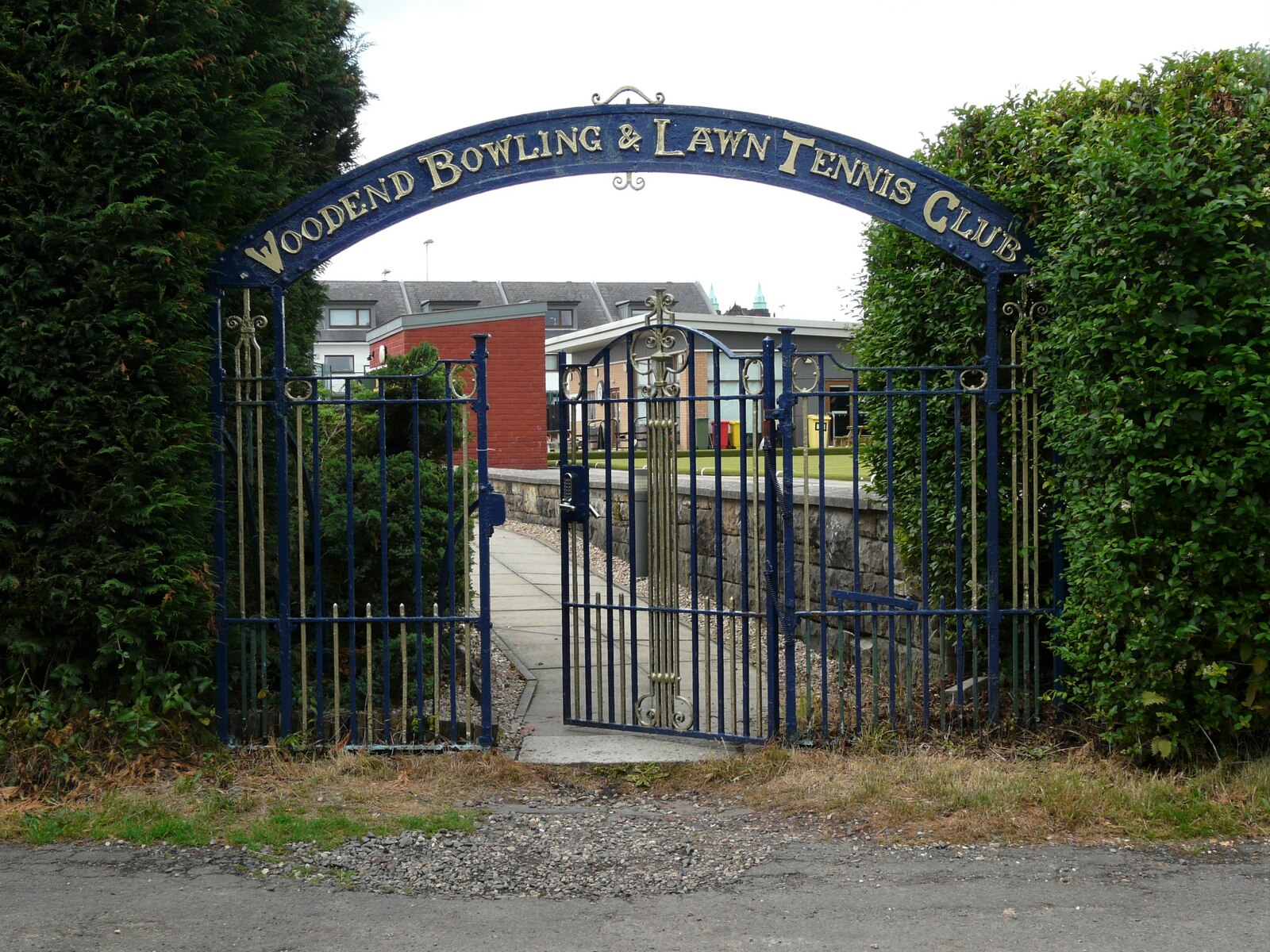
The site of Hillhead HC's clubhouse

The club is relatively young compared to many others in Scotland, being founded in 1970. After the 1988 Summer Olympics the club's Ann Hilton started a junior section called the Hillhead Juniors.

In recent years both the men's and women's first teams have experienced success. The men's team won the Scottish Plate in 2004, 2011 and 2013, while the women's team won National League 2 in 2006, 2014 and 2016.

In 2022, the men's first XI reached the final of the Scottish Cup where they were defeated by Western Wildcats. As of 2025 both the men's and women's firsts play in the Scottish Hockey Premiership.
