= Scottish Hockey =

Governing body of field hockey in Scotland

Scottish Hockey Union
- Sport: Field hockey
- Jurisdiction: Scotland
- Abbreviation: SHU
- Founded: 1989, when the SHA and SWHA merged
- Affiliation: International Hockey Federation
- Affiliation date: 1927 (IFWHA), 1970 (FIH)
- Regional affiliation: European Hockey Federation
- Affiliation date: 1969
- Headquarters: Glasgow National Hockey Centre
- Location: Glasgow
- President: Craig Munro of FMGM Monarchs Hockey Club (elected June 2025)
- Chairman: Martin Shepherdson
- CEO: Barry Cawte

Official website
- www.scottish-hockey.org.uk
- (Scotland)

Scottish Hockey, formerly the Scottish Hockey Union, is the national governing body for the sport of field hockey in Scotland. It is the SHU's responsibility to help provide for the development, promotion and management of hockey in Scotland. It is also the body that acts as "National Association" for Scotland at the EHF and FIH.

== History ==
The origins of the Scottish Hockey Union, like many hockey organisations started with separate associations for men and women. The Scottish Women's Hockey Association (SWHA) was formed in February 1900, in Edinburgh by eight clubs. Dr. Mona Chalmers Watson, from Edinburgh Ladies, was elected the first president with Josephine Katherine Stewart of St Andrews as vice-president.

The Scottish Hockey Association (SHA) was set up on 18 November 1900, when ten clubs met in Glasgow to form the men's association. James Burns, 3rd Baron Inverclyde, was elected the first president. In June 1989 the SHA merged with the SWHA to form the Scottish Hockey Union.

== Current Scotland squads ==
Scottish Hockey are in charge of selecting a number of Scotland national squads. This includes the Scotland men's national field hockey team and Scotland women's national field hockey team squads, as well as Masters and Junior squads.

== Domestic Hockey ==
Scottish Hockey is in charge of organising the Scottish Hockey National Leagues, which consists of the top tier Scottish Hockey Premiership and the second tier Scottish National League. Additionally there are Regional leagues hockey for both men and women's hockey in Scotland. This is for both indoor and outdoor hockey. They also organise all cup competitions, which includes the Scottish Cup, the District Cup and the Reserve Cup.

Scottish Hockey assists with running each district, however a voluntary committee runs senior district league hockey for West, East and North districts.

== Districts ==
There are a number of Districts within Scottish Hockey

- North
- East
- West District Men's Hockey
- West District Women's Hockey
- Midland Hockey Union

== Structure ==
The Scottish Hockey Union Limited (Scottish Hockey) is a company limited by guarantee legally incorporated in Scotland under the Companies Act 2006 (the Act). Under the company's objectives it is responsible primarily as the governing body for all hockey related activity in Scotland and the promotion of those interests.

The directors of Scottish Hockey are responsible for the management of the company's business, for which purpose they may exercise all the powers of the company pursuant to its Articles and in accordance with the Act. The directors are themselves therefore bound by the requirements of the Articles and the Act.

While the Articles permit directors to be appointed to the Board by a variety of means, including by appointment of the members, all directors are then equally required to adhere to the requirements of the Articles and the Act and to therefore act independently and in the best interests of the company (i.e. “Director” is defined in Article 1 as being “a director of the Union, and includes any person occupying the position of director, by whatever name called”).

All directors appointed to the Board must comply with their statutory duties under the Act, including, but not limited to, ensuring that they act in the best interests of the company, Scottish Hockey, and to avoid conflicts of interest.

The Board ensures the executive team led by the chief executive officer (CEO) has the support and guidance to deliver its strategic objectives agreed by the Board. The Board checks and challenges the executive team against these objectives based on comprehensive reports prepared by the executive for Board meetings.

The CEO and the executive team have delegated powers and contractual responsibility to make all operational and day-to-day decisions they feel are best for the company. These decisions are expected to be made on a reasonable basis having carried out appropriate due diligence and considering and acting in the best interests of the company.

The CEO is accountable to the chair of the board and the executive team is accountable to the CEO. In addition, the Board reserves certain matters to itself as the ultimate decision-making body.

The President and vice-president are not directors of Scottish Hockey and do not have a vote on strategic decisions at Board level. However, they are important conduits of information to and from the membership, which aid strategic and operational decision-making. They are important ambassadors for the reputation, development and growth of the game.

Members can add valuable knowledge and insight into Scottish Hockey's strategic direction via a number of avenues, such as:

strategic consultations, the Scottish Hockey AGM; direct communication with the Scottish Hockey executive team or via sub-committees of the Scottish Hockey Board. These can make recommendations and give insight to the board. Sub-committees are established at the discretion of the Board; via advisory groups. These are established and utilised at the discretion of the CEO and can make recommendations and give insight to the executive team and member engagement surveys.

== Rules ==
Scottish Hockey has Memorandum and Articles, bye laws, codes and standing orders (instead of a constitution).

== Members ==
The members of Scottish Hockey are districts, clubs and schools, who have equal voting rights at General Meetings.
