= Scottish Hockey Premiership =

Scottish hockey league

- Sport: Field hockey
- Founded: 1975; 51 years ago
- Administrator: Scottish Hockey
- No. of teams: 12 (men's); 12 (women's)
- Country: Scotland
- Confederation: EHF (Europe)
- Most recent champions: Western Wildcats (men); Watsonians (women)
- Most titles: Kelburne (18) (men); Glasgow Western (19) (women)
- Relegation to: National League
- International cup: Euro Hockey League
- Website: Scottish Hockey
- Current Season (Men) – SHDB

The Scottish Hockey Premiership (formerly National League 1) is the highest league in men's and women's hockey in Scotland. The leagues are overseen by Scottish Hockey.

== History ==
The national league system was founded in 1975 after competitive district hockey proved popular. An annual tournament pitted the top teams from each district against one another, and this eventually formed the basis of a national league system.

The 1974–75 season was the initial step towards forming "official" national leagues in 1975-76. Participating clubs in 1974–75 played for league placement in the following season. Clubs across Scotland were invited to participate in the National League, with clubs split into three leagues. At the end of the season, the teams were divided into six leagues of 8 teams.

The league changed its name from the National League 1 to the Premiership for the 2019–20 season but due to the COVID-19 pandemic the season was declared void.

== Current teams ==
Men

The 12 clubs listed below will compete in the men's Premiership during the 2025–26 season.

Club	Location	Position in 2024–25
Clydesdale	Glasgow	8th, Men's Premiership
Dundee Wanderers	Dundee	10th, Men's Premiership
Edinburgh University	Edinburgh	4th, Men's Premiership
ESM	Edinburgh	6th, Men's Premiership
Grange	Edinburgh	2nd, Men's Premiership
Grove Menzieshill	Dundee	7th, Men's Premiership
Hillhead	Glasgow	5th, Men's Premiership
Inverleith	Edinburgh	11th, Men's Premiership
Uddingston	Uddingston	9th, Men's Premiership
University of St Andrews	St Andrews	winner, Men's National League
Watsonians	Edinburgh	3rd, Men's Premiership
Western	Glasgow	1st, Men's Premiership

Women

The 12 clubs listed below will compete in the women's Premiership during the 2025–26 season.

Club	Location	Position in 2024–25
Aberdeen University	Aberdeen	winner, Women's National League
Clydesdale	Glasgow	2nd, Women's Premiership
Edinburgh University	Edinburgh	4th, Women's Premiership
GHK	Glasgow	3rd, Women's Premiership
Glasgow University	Glasgow	6th, Women's Premiership
Grange	Edinburgh	8th, Women's Premiership
Hillhead	Glasgow	11th, Women's Premiership
Inverleith	Edinburgh	9th, Women's Premiership
Uddingston	Uddingston	10th, Women's Premiership
University of St Andrews	St Andrews	7th, Women's Premiership
Watsonians	Edinburgh	1st, Women's Premiership
Western	Glasgow	5th, Women's Premiership

== Past winners ==
=== Men ===
Season	Champions	Runners-up	Third place	ref/notes
1975–76	Edinburgh Civil Service (1)	Western	I.C.I. Grangemouth	
1976–77	Edinburgh Civil Service (2)	Western	Grange	
1977–78	Edinburgh Civil Service (3)	Western	Grange	
1978–79	Edinburgh Civil Service (4)	Western	Inverleith	
1979–80	Edinburgh Civil Service (5)	I.C.I. Grangemouth	Grange	
1980–81	Edinburgh Civil Service (6)	Inverleith	I.C.I. Grangemouth	
1981–82	Edinburgh Civil Service (7)	Grange	Western	
1982–83	Grange (1)	Menzieshill	Edinburgh Civil Service	
1983–84	Edinburgh Civil Service (8)	Western	Grange	
1984–85	Edinburgh Civil Service (9)	Menzieshill	Western	
1985–86	Menzieshill (1)	Edinburgh Civil Service	Gordonians	
1986–87	Edinburgh Civil Service (10)	Menzieshill	Western	
1987–88	Edinburgh Civil Service (11)	Dundee Wanderers	Menzieshill	
1988–89	Menzieshill (2)	Edinburgh Civil Service	I.C.I. Grangemouth	
1989–90	Kelburne (1)	Edinburgh Civil Service	Grange	
1990–91	Kelburne (2)	Edinburgh Civil Service	Grange	
1991–92	Kelburne (3)	Dundee Wanderers	Edinburgh Civil Service	
1992–93	Dundee Wanderers (1)	Kelburne	Gordonians	
1993–94	Kelburne (4)	Grange	Dundee Wanderers	
1994–95	Grange (2)	MIM Edinburgh	Dundee Wanderers	
1995–96	Grange (3)	Gordonians	Western	
1996–97	Western (1)	Grange	Dundee Wanderers	
1997–98	Western (2)	Gordonians	Grange	
1998–99	Western (3)	MIM Edinburgh	Dundee Wanderers	
1999–2000	Western (4)	Dundee Wanderers	Menzieshill	
2000–01	Western (5)	Grange	Menzieshill	
2001–02	Grange (4)	Western	Kelburne	
2002–03	Western (6)	Grange	Kelburne	
2003–04	Western (7)	Kelburne	Grange	
2004–05	Kelburne (5)	Grange	Inverleith	
2005–06	Kelburne (6)	Grange	Western	
2006–07	Kelburne (7)	Western	Inverleith	
2007–08	Kelburne (8)	Western	Grange	
2008–09	Kelburne (9)	Western	Inverleith	
2009–10	Kelburne (10)	Western	Clydesdale	
2010–11	Kelburne (11)	Grange	Grove Menzieshill	
2011–12	Kelburne (12)	Grange	Western	
2012–13	Kelburne (13)	Grange	Grove Menzieshill	
2013–14	Kelburne (14)	Western	Hillhead	
2014–15	Kelburne (15)	Grange	Western	
2015–16	Kelburne (16)	Grove Menzieshill	Grange	
2016–17	Kelburne (17)	Grange	Grove Menzieshill	
2017–18	Grange (5)	Kelburne	Grove Menzieshill	
2018–19	Grange (6)	Grove Menzieshill	Western	
2019–20	void due to COVID-19 pandemic			(Note: The 2019–20 Scottish Hockey Premiership was suspended in March 2020 due to the COVID-19 pandemic in Scotland. A points average was taken but no league winners were declared)
2020–21	void due to COVID-19 pandemic			
2021–22	Western (8)	Grange	Edinburgh University	
2022–23	Grange (7)	Western	Edinburgh University	
2023–24	Grange (8)	Edinburgh University	Western	
2024–25	Western (9)	Grange	Watsonians	
2025–26	Edinburgh University (1)	Western Wildcats	Watsonians	

==== Total titles won ====
Titles won by club (%)
1. Kelburne – 17 (35.4%)
2. Cala Edinburgh – 11 (22.9%)
3. Western – 9 (18.7%)
4. Grange – 8 (16.7%)
5. Other clubs – 4 (6.30%)

Club	Champions	Runners-up	Third place	Last championship
Kelburne	17	3	2	2016–17
Cala Edinburgh (Note: Formerly known as Edinburgh Civil Service and MIM Edinburgh)	11	6	2	1987–88
Western	9	13	9	2024–25
Grange	8 (Note: Grange were top of the Premiership before the league was declared void due to the COVID pandemic, and therefor did not claim the title)	14	10	2023–24
Grove Menzieshill	2 (Note: 2 won as Menzieshill)	5 (Note: 3 won as Menzieshill)	7	1988–89
Dundee Wanderers	1	3	4	1992–93
Edinburgh University	1	1	2	2025–26

=== Women ===
Season	Champions
1982-1983	Glasgow Western Ladies (1)
1983-1984	Glasgow Western Ladies (2)
1984-1985	Glasgow Western Ladies (3)
1985-1986	Glasgow Western Ladies (4)
1986-1987	Glasgow Western Ladies (5)
1987-1988	Glasgow Western Ladies (6)
1988-1989	Glasgow Western Ladies (7)
1989-1990	Glasgow Western Ladies (8)
1990-1991	Glasgow Western Ladies (9)
1991-1992	Glasgow Western Ladies (10)
1992-1993	Glasgow Western Ladies (11)
1993-1994	Glasgow Western Ladies (12)
1994-1995	Glasgow Western Ladies (13)
1995-1996	Glasgow Western Ladies (14)
1996-1997	Edinburgh Ladies (1)
1997-1998	Edinburgh Ladies (2)
1998-1999	Glasgow Western Ladies (15)
1999-2000	Glasgow Western Ladies (16)
2000-2001	Bonagrass Grove (1)
2001-2002	Glasgow Western Ladies (17)
2002-2003	Glasgow Western Ladies (18)
2003-2004	Bonagrass Grove (2)
2004-2005	Bonagrass Grove (3)
2005-2006	Glasgow Western Ladies (19)
2006-2007	Bonagrass Grove (4)
2007-2008	Bonagrass Grove (5)
2008-2009	Bonagrass Grove (6)
2009-2010	Bonagrass Grove (7)
2010-2011	Grove Menzieshill (1)
2011-2012	Grove Menzieshill (2)
2012-2013	Grove Menzieshill (3)
2013-2014	Clydesdale Western Ladies (1)
2014-2015	Edinburgh University (1)
2015-2016	Edinburgh University (2)
2016-2017	Edinburgh University (3)
2017-2018	Edinburgh University (4)
2018-2019	Edinburgh University (5)
2019–2020	void due to COVID-19 pandemic
2020–2021	void due to COVID-19 pandemic
2021–2022	Watsonians (1)
2022–2023	Watsonians (2)
2023–2024	Watsonians (3)
2024–2025	Watsonians (4)
