= Scottish Hockey National Leagues =

Scottish field hockey league system

- Sport: Field hockey
- Founded: 1974; 52 years ago
- Administrator: Scottish Hockey
- No. of teams: 12 (men & women's Premiership); 12 (men & women's National League); 18 (men's Regional League 1&2); 12 (women's Championship)
- Country: Scotland
- Confederation: EHF (Europe)
- International cup: Euro Hockey League
- Website: Scottish Hockey

The Scottish Hockey national leagues are the league system for field hockey in Scotland. It currently runs the Premiership, National League for men and women. The season runs from September to May, with a break in winter for the Indoor league. The winners of the Premiership (both men's and women's) are declared Scottish Champions. The men's national league system was formed in 1975 after competitive district hockey proved popular. The 1974-75 district results were used to populate the inaugural season which was made up of three leagues of twelve. Following the first season, the leagues were split into six leagues of eight teams.

== Format ==
Teams receive three points for a win, one point for a draw and no points for a loss. Teams are ranked by total points, then goal difference, and then goals scored. At the end of each season, the club with the most points is crowned league champion. The top teams in the National League gain automatic promotion to the Premiership, swapping places with the bottom side from the Premiership, who is automatically relegated. The team that finished second in the National League has a one off game against the eleventh placed side from the Premiership. The winner of this game earns the right to play in the Premiership for the following season.

The top four teams in the men`s and women`s Premiership play off in semi-finals and finals to see who competes in Europe's top competition, the EHL for the following season. The grand final weekend takes place at the end of the season (normally the start of May), where first plays fourth and second plays third. The winners of these games play in the final to confirm European qualification. The winner of the final is named National Champion.

== Premiership ==
The Men's Premiership and Women's Premiership (formerly National League 1) is the top of the top tier of field hockey in Scotland. The winners are crowned as champions of Scotland.

- For current teams and past winners see Scottish Hockey Premiership.

== National League ==
The men's and women's National League (formerly National League 2) is the second tier of field hockey in Scotland. The team that finishes first is promoted to the Premiership, whilst second place has the chance for promotion in one off play-off game against eleventh place in the Premiership. Teams are not automatically relegated from the national league but may opt to drop down to regional leagues.

- For current teams and past winners see Scottish Hockey National League.

== Defunct leagues ==
=== Men's National Leagues 3 to 6 ===
The Men's National League 3 was the third tier of men's field hockey in Scotland. It became the lowest tier of national league hockey in Scotland after the formation of the regional leagues in 1997-98 season. The final season of the men’s national league 3 was 2019-20, which was cut short due to the COVID-19 pandemic. When hockey restarted in Scotland, not enough clubs wanted to compete in the national league, and thus only two leagues were reformed.

The Men's National League 4, 5 and 6 are now defunct leagues that featured from 1976 until the formation of the Regional Leagues in 1997. The leagues were formed after the inaugural National Leagues went from three divisions of twelve teams, to six leagues of eight. When the Regional Leagues were formed, the teams from the bottom three leagues moved into them.

==== Past winners ====
See List of Scottish hockey other National League champions for a list of past winners

== Men's Indoor National League ==
The Men's Indoor National League Division 1 is the top tier of men's indoor hockey in Scotland. The winners are crowned Scottish Hockey indoor champions and represent Scotland in the EHF Eurohockey Indoor Club Championships.
