= 2018 Men's Premier Hockey League (South Africa) =

Hockey League

Tournament details
- Host country: Johannesburg
- City: South Africa
- Dates: 11 August 2018–27 August 2018
- Teams: 6
- Venue: Randburg Hockey Stadium

Tournament statistics
- Matches played: 16
- Goals scored: 63 (3.94 per match)
- Top scorer: Jethro Eustice (Dragons) (6 goals)
- Best player: Jethro Eustice (Dragons)
- Best young player: Peter Jarvis
- Best goalkeeper: Siya Nolutshungu (Gazelles)

The 2018 Men's Premier Hockey League was the 3rd edition of the Premier Hockey League, the annual tournament men's field hockey championship of South Africa.

The Drakensberg Dragons won the tournament for the first time, defeating the Addo Elephants 2–0 in the final.

== Competition format ==
=== Format ===
The 2018 Premier Hockey League followed a single round-robin format, followed by a classification round.

During the pool stage teams played each other once. The top four ranked teams qualified for the Classification Round. Team 1 played Team 4, while Team 2 played Team 3 in the two semi-finals. The two victorious teams moved onto the Final, while the losing teams competed for third place.

=== Point allocation ===
Match points will be distributed as follows:

- 4 points: win by 3+ goals
- 3 points: win and shoot-out win
- 1 point: shoot-out loss
- 0 points: loss

== Participating teams ==
Each squad consists of 20 players, made up of 7 marquee players as determined by SA Hockey's team, with a further 3 players into their 20 from the "new generation" pool featuring the country's most exciting young talent. Coaches were forced to release between 4 and 8 players from the 2018 squads ahead of the draft.

Addo Elephants

Head Coach: Cheslyn Gie

2. Onke Letuka
5. Ignatius Malgraff
6. Zamo Ngubo
8. Joshua August
9. Cerezo Comerasamy
10. Tevin Pieterson
13. Miguel de Graca
14. Jody Erasmus
16. Bjorn Sorenson
17. Andrew Manson
18. Tim Guise-Brown
19. Sinoxolo Mbekeni
20. Damian Kimfley
21. Julian Hykes
22. Daniel Bell
24. Andrew Buckley
31. Matthew Martins
0. Reberto Bosman
0. Cody Posthumus
0. Robin Jones
Drakensberg Dragons

Head Coach: Siphesihle Ntuli

1. Gary Cooper
2. Jethro Eustice
3. Grant Robertson
4. Cody van Wyk
5. Melrick Maddocks
6. Dylan Swanepoel
8. Keegan Hezlett
9. Amkelwe Letuka
10. Nqobile Ntuli
11. Chad Cairncross
12. Nick Gonzalves
13. Blake Tyack
15. Peter Jarvis
16. Mattew de Sousa
17. Mbuso Mgobozi
18. Francois Pretorius
19. Mohamed Mea
20. Richard Pautz
21. Cameron Ryan
23. Lance de Kock
31. Gowan Jones
Golden Gate Gladiators

Head Coach:Garreth Ewing

5. Matthew Davies
6. Chris Makaba
7. Lungani Gabela
8. Andile Ndlovu
9. Che February
10. Mark Chong
11. Michael Horan
12. Max Pike
13. Andrew Hobson
14. Matthew Roman
15. Wade Dollman
16. Jared Cass
17. Bradley Sherwood
20. Michael Forrest
21. Clayton Saker
23. Samkelo Mvimbi
31. Duncan Fischer
0. William Eveleigh
Garden Route Gazelles

Head Coach: Ashlin Freddy

1. Siya Nolutshungu
2. Brandon James
3. Tyson Dlungwana
4. Gertjie Lamprecht
5. Berne Burger
6. Taylor Dart
7. Dylan Coombes
8. Michael Abrahams
9. Gerald Mpopo
10. Keenan Horne
11. Le-Neal Jackson
13. Pierre Botma
15. Clinton Panther
17. Luke Schooling
21. Tom Richardson
22. Connor Beauchamp
23. Reece Arendse
0. Jean-Pierre de Voux
0. Keagan de Castro
0. Jayson Reed
0. Taine Paton
Maropeng Cavemen

Head Coach: Mark Sanders

5. Reza Rosenberg
7. Cameron Mackay
8. Lethu Thomo
9. Steven Paulo
10. Thabang Modise
11. Lance Louw
12. Nduduza Lembethe
13. Adrian Abrahams
14. Rusten Abrahams
15. Rayner York
16. Kyle Lion-Cachet
17. Ryan Crowe
18. Chad Futcher
19. Brynn Cleak
20. Craig Wiid
21. Travis Hardnick
22. Tommy Hammond
23. Rassie Pieterse
24. Stephen Cant
25. Ricky West
25. Kingsley Botes
27. Estiaan Kriek
0. Dalan Philips
Mapungubwe Mambas

Head Coach: Lungile Tsolekile

1. Rob Mckinley
2. Laython Coombs
4. Xola Maqula
6. Luthando Jonas
8. Dillan Langeveld
9. Michael Baiden
10. Tevin Kok
11. Owen Mvimbi
12. Caleb Syce
13. Jonty Robinson
14. Ross Gonzalves
15. Callum Buchanan
16. Delpiarro Langford
17. Winchester Scott
18. Alex Stewart
19. Kyle Essau
20. David Zwemke
21. Courtney Halle
23. Mjekejwa Mohlaba
25. Michael Marki
26. Matt Brown
0. Kewan Harries

== Results ==
=== Pool stage ===
Pos	Team	Pld	W	WD	LD	L	GF	GA	GD	Pts	Qualification
1	–– Drakensberg Dragons	5	4	0	0	1	20	9	+11	12	Semi-Final
2	–– Addo Elephants	5	3	1	0	1	9	6	+3	12	Semi-Final
3	–– Garden Route Gazelles	5	3	0	1	1	16	10	+6	10	Semi-Final
4	–– Maropeng Cavemen	5	1	1	0	3	5	14	−9	6	Semi-Final
5	–– Golden Gate Gladiators	5	1	0	1	3	7	13	−6	4	
6	–– Mapungubwe Mambas	5	1	0	0	4	8	13	−5	3	

Source: SA Hockey
Rules for classification: 1) points; 2) matches won; 3) goal difference; 4) goals for; 5) head-to-head result; 6) field goals scored.

==== Matches ====
11 August 2018
08:00

Golden Gate Gladiators	1-3	Mapungubwe Mambas
Forrest 38'	Report	Jonas 2'; Baiden 19'; Robinson 49'

11 August 2018
12:00

Addo Elephants	3-2	Drakensberg Dragons
Hykes 13', 60+'; Manson 15'	Report	Pretorius 26'; Pautz 42'

11 August 2018
16:00

Maropeng Cavemen	3-3	Garden Route Gazelles
Mackay 30'; Lion-Cachet 49', 58'	Report	Dlungwana 21'; Arendse 24'; Schooling 60'
Penalties
Hardnick (penalty shoot-out missed); Mackay (penalty shoot-out scored); Crowe (penalty shoot-out scored); Futcher (penalty shoot-out scored); Paulo (penalty shoot-out scored)	4-3	(penalty shoot-out missed) Panther; (penalty shoot-out missed) Coombes; (penalty shoot-out scored) Dart; (penalty shoot-out scored) Horne; (penalty shoot-out scored) Abrahams

12 August 2018
10:00

Golden Gate Gladiators	3-3	Addo Elephants
Roman 2'; Dollman 7'; S. Mvimbi 32'	Report	Hykes 21', 25'; Manson 36'
Penalties
Pike (penalty shoot-out missed); Hobson (penalty shoot-out scored); Davies (penalty shoot-out missed); Sherwood (penalty shoot-out scored); February (penalty shoot-out missed)	2-3	(penalty shoot-out missed) Hykes; (penalty shoot-out scored) Sorenson; (penalty shoot-out scored) da Graca; (penalty shoot-out scored) Manson

12 August 2018
14:00

Mapungubwe Mambas	1-4	Maropeng Cavemen
Syce 21'	Report	Futcher 1'; York 4'; Thomo 22'; Paulo 41'

16 August 2018
08:00

Drakensberg Dragons	4-2	Garden Route Gazelles
Tyack 10'; Pautz 14'; Maddocks 45' van Wyk 46'	Report	Paton 2'; Beauchamp 11'

16 August 2018
14:00

Golden Gate Gladiators	3-1	Maropeng Cavemen
Makaba 1'; Dollman 18'; Cass 60'	Report	Rosenberg 47'

16 August 2018
14:00

Mapungubwe Mambas	1-2	Addo Elephants
Gonzalves 28'	Report	Guise-Brown 29'; Malgraff 40'

17 August 2018
10:00

Golden Gate Gladiators	3-5	Garden Route Gazelles
S. Mvimbi 28'; Sherwood 35', 0'	Report	James 4', 20'; Abrahams 23'; Paton 45'; Horne 46'

17 August 2018
14:00

Drakensberg Dragons	6-1	Maropeng Cavemen
Eustice 9'; Tyack 23'; Ryan 34'; Cairncross 46'; Jarvis 50'; Ntuli 59'	Report	Futcher 26'

18 August 2018
10:00

Mapungubwe Mambas	1-3	Garden Route Gazelles
Syce 25'	Report	Beauchamp 1'; Panther 44'; Burger 47'

18 August 2018
14:00

Addo Elephants	2-1	Maropeng Cavemen
Malgraff 26', 60'	Report	Futcher 55'

18 August 2018
16:00

Golden Gate Gladiators	0-2	Drakensberg Dragons
	Report	Pautz 21', 50'

19 August 2018
10:00

Addo Elephants	1-3	Garden Route Gazelles
Malgraff 60'	Report	James 27'; Abrahams 53'; Mpopo 60'

19 August 2018
14:00

Mapungubwe Mambas	2-3	Drakensberg Dragons
Halle 54'; Jonas 57'	Report	Mgobozi 26'; Pautz 35'; Letuka 47'

=== Classification stage ===
Semi-finals
25 August 2018
Drakensberg Dragons	2
Maropeng Cavemen	0
25 August 2018
Addo Elephants	3
Garden Route Gazelles	1

Final
26 August 2018
Drakensberg Dragons	2
Addo Elephants	0
Third place
26 August 2018
Maropeng Cavemen (SO)	2(0)
Garden Route Gazelles	2(2)

==== Semi-finals ====
25 August 2018
12:00

Addo Elephants	3-1	Garden Route Gazelles
Kimfley 47'; Guise-Brown 60'	Report	Arendse 38'

25 August 2018
16:00

Drakensberg Dragons	2-0	Maropeng Cavemen
Ntuli 44'; Letuka 54'	Report

==== Third place game ====
26 August 2018
12:00

Maropeng Cavemen	2-2	Garden Route Gazelles
Cleak 15'; Abrahams 53'	Report	Abrahams 22'; James 37'
Penalties
Mackay (penalty shoot-out missed); Abrahams (penalty shoot-out missed); Crowe (penalty shoot-out missed); Futcher (penalty shoot-out missed)	0-2	(penalty shoot-out missed) Mpopo; (penalty shoot-out scored) Dlungwana; (penalty shoot-out missed) Botma; (penalty shoot-out scored) Arendse

==== Final ====
26 August 2018
16:00

Drakensberg Dragons	2-0	Addo Elephants
Ntuli 3'; Pautz 20'	Report

== Awards ==
Player of the tournament	Goalkeeper of the tournament	Top goalscorer	Young Player of the tournament
Jethro Eustice (Dragons)	Siya Nolutshungu (Gazelles)	Richard Pautz (Dragons)	Peter Jarvis (Dragons)

== Final ranking ==
Rank	Team
1st place, gold medalist(s)	Drakensberg Dragons
2nd place, silver medalist(s)	Addo Elephants
3rd place, bronze medalist(s)	Garden Route Gazelles
4	Maropeng Cavemen
5	Golden Gate Gladiators
6	Mapungubwe Mambas

== Goalscorers ==
There have been 63 goals scored in 16 matches, for an average of 3.94 goals per match.

6 goals

- Richard Pautz (Drakensberg Dragons)

4 goals

- Julian Hykes (Addo Elephants)
- Brandon James (Garden Route Gazelles)
- Ignatius Malgraff (Addo Elephants)

3 goals

- Michael Abrahams (Garden Route Gazelles)
- Chad Futcher (Maropeng Cavemen)
- Nqobile Ntuli (Drakensberg Dragons)

2 goals

- Reece Arendse (Garden Route Gazelles)
- Connor Beauchamp (Garden Route Gazelles)
- Wade Dollman (Golden Gate Gladiators)
- Tim Guise-Brown (Addo Elephants)
- Luthando Jonas (Mapungubwe Mambas)
- Damian Kimfley (Addo Elephants)
- Amkelwe Letuka (Drakensberg Dragons)
- Kyle Lion-Cachet (Maropeng Cavemen)
- Andrew Manson (Addo Elephants)
- Sam Mvimbi (Golden Gate Gladiators)
- Taine Paton (Garden Route Gazelles)
- Bradley Sherwood (Golden Gate Gladiators)
- Caleb Syce (Mapungubwe Mambas)
- Blake Tyack (Drakensberg Dragons)

1 goal

- Rusten Abrahams (Maropeng Cavemen)
- Michael Baiden (Mapungubwe Mambas)
- Berne Burger (Garden Route Gazelles)
- Chad Cairncross (Drakensberg Dragons)
- Jared Cass (Golden Gate Gladiators)
- Brynn Cleak (Maropeng Cavemen)
- Tyson Dlungwana (Garden Route Gazelles)
- Jethro Eustice (Drakensberg Dragons)
- Michael Forrest (Golden Gate Gladiators)
- Ross Gonzalves (Mapungubwe Mambas)
- Courtney Halle (Mapungubwe Mambas)
- Keenan Horne (Garden Route Gazelles)
- Peter Jarvis (Drakensberg Dragons)
- Cameron Mackay (Maropeng Cavemen)
- Melrick Maddocks (Drakensberg Dragons)
- Chris Makaba (Golden Gate Gladiators)
- Mbuso Mgobozi (Drakensberg Dragons)
- Gerald Mpopo (Garden Route Gazelles)
- Clinton Panther (Garden Route Gazelles)
- Steven Paulo (Maropeng Cavemen)
- Francois Pretorius (Drakensberg Dragons)
- Jonty Robinson (Mapungubwe Mambas)
- Matthew Roman (Golden Gate Gladiators)
- Reza Rosenberg (Maropeng Cavemen)
- Cameron Ryan (Drakensberg Dragons)
- Luke Schooling (Garden Route Gazelles)
- Lethu Thomo (Maropeng Cavemen)
- Cody van Wyk (Drakensberg Dragons)
- Rayner York (Maropeng Cavemen)

Source: SAHA
