= 2019 Men's Premier Hockey League (South Africa) =

Tournament details
- Host country: Johannesburg
- City: South Africa
- Dates: 18 July 2019–4 August 2019
- Teams: 6
- Venue: Randburg Hockey Stadium

Final positions
- Champions: Drakensberg Dragons
- Runner-up: Mapungubwe Mambas
- Third place: Garden Route Gazelles

Tournament statistics
- Matches played: 19
- Goals scored: 102 (5.37 per match)
- Top scorer: Keegan Hezlett (5 goals)
- Best player: Nqobile Ntuli
- Best young player: Mustaphaa Cassiem
- Best goalkeeper: Rob McKinley

The 2019 Men's Premier Hockey League was the 4th edition of the Premier Hockey League, the annual tournament men's field hockey championship of South Africa.

== Competition format ==
=== Format ===
The 2019 Premier Hockey League followed a single round-robin format, followed by a classification round.

During the pool stage teams played each other once. The top four ranked teams qualified for the Classification Round. Team 1 played Team 4, while Team 2 played Team 3 in the two semi-finals. The two victorious teams moved onto the Final, while the losing teams competed for third place.

=== Point allocation ===
Match points were distributed as follows:

- 4 points: win by 3+ goals
- 3 points: win and shoot-out win
- 1 point: shoot-out loss
- 0 points: loss

== Participating teams ==
Each squad consists of 20 players, made up of 7 marquee players as determined by SA Hockey's team, with a further 3 players into their 20 from the "new generation" pool featuring the country's most exciting young talent. Coaches were forced to release between 4 and 8 players from the 2018 squads ahead of the draft.

Addo Elephants

Head Coach: Cheslyn Gie

2. Onke Letuka
3. Matthew Davies
5. Lungani Gabela
5. Aiden Tun
6. Zamo Ngubo
7. Chris Makaba
8. Reza Rosenberg
9. Cerezo Comerasamy
10. Jared de Kock
13. Cody Posthumus
14. Andrew Buckley
16. Bjorn Sorenson
17. Rusten Abrahams
18. Laython Coombs
19. Sinoxolo Mbekeni
20. Gareth Heyns
21. Julian Hykes (C)
22. Chad Futcher
31. Matthew Martins (GK)
0. Liyabona Sigwabe
Drakensberg Dragons

Head Coach: Siphesihle Ntuli

2. Jethro Eustice (C)
3. Ross Hetem
4. Cody van Wyk
5. Melrick Maddocks
6. Dylan Swanepoel
8. Suubi Mugerwa-Sekawabe
9. Amkelwe Letuka
10. Nqobile Ntuli
11. Trevor de Lora
12. Chad Cairncross
15. Ignatius Malgraff
16. Mattew de Sousa
17. Miguel da Graca
18. Francois Pretorius
19. Ryan Crowe
20. Richard Pautz
21. Pierre Botma
23. Andile Ndlovu
24. Cameron Ryan
31. Gowan Jones (C, GK)
31. Sizwe Mthembu (GK)
Golden Gate Gladiators

Head Coach:Neville Rothman

1. Taine Bird
5. Mpumelelo Maphumula
7. Tumi Ramphele
8. Angelo Walstroom
9. Tevin Peterson
10. Luke Wynford
11. Idrees Abdulla
12. Michael Horan
13. Matthew Dewar
14. Jared Campbell
16. Michael van den Berg
17. Guy Morgan
18. Michael Newland-Nel
19. Sam Mvimbi
20. Peter Jarvis
21. Jacques van Tonder
23. Clayton Saker
26. Bayanda Simetu
31. Kyle Coker
Garden Route Gazelles

Head Coach: Ashlin Freddy

1. Siya Nolutshungu (GK)
2. Brandon James
5. Senswesihle Ngubane
6. Hans Neethling
7. Berne Burger
8. Daniel Sibbald
9. Marvin Simmons
10. Keenan Horne (C)
11. Lance Louw
13. Jonty Robinson (C)
14. Taylor Dart
15. Dayne Samboer
17. Charlie Bowren
18. Taine Paton
20. Jayson Reed
21. Brett Walraven
22. Connor Beauchamp
23. Reece Arendse
24. Kewan Harries
27. Abenathi Botha
31. Sizwe Mthembu (GK)
Maropeng Cavemen

Head Coach: Mark Sanders

2. Dayaan Cassiem
3. Gerald Mpopo
4. James Watters
5. Michael Abrahams
6. Lethu Thomo
7. Cameron Mackay
8. Spencer Botes
9. Mark Chong
11. Keegan Hezlett
12. Callum Buchanan
13. Nicholas Pio
14. Donovan Cheng
15. Clinton Panther
17. Joshua Finlay
18. Nduduzo Lembethe
19. Brynn Cleak
20. Adrian Abrahams
21. Courtney Halle
23. Rassie Pieterse
25. Craig Wiid
Mapungubwe Mambas

Head Coach: Lungile Tsolekile

1. Rob Mckinley (GK)
6. Luthando Jonas
7. Ryan Mann
9. Wade Dollman
10. Tevin Kok
11. Owen Mvimbi (C)
12. Caleb Syce
13. Cole Walbrugh
14. Niel Raath
15. Greg Last (C)
16. Mjekejwa Mohlaba
17. Michael Marki
18. Ross Gonzalves
19. Ryan Julius
20. Damian Kimfley
21. Matt Brown
22. Tommy Hammond
24. Mustaphaa Cassiem
25. Robin Jones
0. Bulelani Ngqukuvana

== Results ==
=== Pool stage ===
Pos	Team	Pld	W	WD	LD	L	GF	GA	GD	Pts	Qualification
1	–– Mapungubwe Mambas	5	4	1	0	0	16	7	+9	15	Semi-Final
2	–– Drakensberg Dragons	5	2	1	0	2	17	12	+5	9	Semi-Final
3	–– Garden Route Gazelles	5	2	0	1	2	19	12	+7	7	Semi-Final
4	–– Maropeng Cavemen	5	3	0	0	2	14	14	0	9	Semi-Final
5	–– Addo Elephants	5	2	0	0	3	15	17	−2	6	
6	–– Golden Gate Gladiators	5	0	0	1	4	6	26	−20	1	

Source: SA Hockey
Rules for classification: 1) points; 2) matches won; 3) goal difference; 4) goals for; 5) head-to-head result; 6) field goals scored.

==== Matches ====
18 July 2019
10:00

Golden Gate Gladiators	2–2	Mapungubwe Mambas
Ramphele 23'; S. Mvimbi 30'	Report	Last 38'; Jonas 44'
Penalties
van den Berg (penalty shoot-out missed) van Tonder (penalty shoot-out scored); Saker (penalty shoot-out missed); Abdulla (penalty shoot-out missed)	1–3	(penalty shoot-out missed) Mann; (penalty shoot-out missed) O. Mvimbi; (penalty shoot-out scored) Jonas; (penalty shoot-out scored) M. Cassiem; (penalty shoot-out scored) Gonzalves

18 July 2019
14:00

Maropeng Cavemen	2–1	Garden Route Gazelles
Mackay 34'; Botes 39'	Report	Sibbald 38'

18 July 2019
18:00

Addo Elephants	1–4	Drakensberg Dragons
Mbekeni 56'	Report	Pautz 4', 19'; Botma 39', 53'

19 July 2019
10:00

Golden Gate Gladiators	0-5	Addo Elephants
	Report	Rosenberg 27'; Comerasamy 34', 49'; Mbekeni 55'; Hykes 59'

18 July 2019
14:00

Mapungubwe Mambas	2-1	Maropeng Cavemen
M. Cassiem 7'; Kok 56'	Report	Wiid 57'

20 July 2019
12:00

Drakensberg Dragons	4-4	Garden Route Gazelles
Crowe 13'; Ntuli 50'; Botma 55' da Graca 60'	Report	James 44'; Beauchamp 48'; Burger 54'; Neethling 58'
Penalties
van Wyk (penalty shoot-out scored); Botma (penalty shoot-out missed); Crowe (penalty shoot-out scored); Ntuli (penalty shoot-out scored)	3-0	(penalty shoot-out missed) Samboer; (penalty shoot-out missed) Dart; (penalty shoot-out missed) Simmons

20 July 2019
16:00

Golden Gate Gladiators	3-5	Maropeng Cavemen
Abdulla 35'; Walstroom 51'; Ramphele 58'	Report	Hezlett 24', 45'; Wiid 35'; Mackay 37'; Mpopo 45'

21 July 2019
08:00

Golden Gate Gladiators	1-7	Garden Route Gazelles
S. Mvimbi 4'	Report	Neethling 1'; Ngubane 3'; Louw 5'; Beauchamp 9', 48'; Burger 27'; Simmons 42'

21 July 2019
10:00

Mapungubwe Mambas	5-1	Addo Elephants
Dollman 16', 40'; Brown 24'; M. Cassiem 36'; Kok 55'	Report	Futcher 10'

21 July 2019
16:00

Drakensberg Dragons	2-3	Maropeng Cavemen
Cairncross 28'; Malgraff 41'	Report	D. Cassiem 36'; Hezlett 48'; Halle 57'

27 July 2019
12:00

Mapungubwe Mambas	3-2	Garden Route Gazelles
M. Cassiem 17'; O. Mvimbi 27'; Dollman 45'	Report	James 53'; Simmons 57'

27 July 2019
16:00

Addo Elephants	6-3	Maropeng Cavemen
Comerasamy 4', 44'; Hykes 6', 15', 52'; Mbekeni 38'	Report	Abrahams 6'; Hezlett 27'; Halle 36'

27 July 2019
18:00

Golden Gate Gladiators	0-6	Drakensberg Dragons
	Report	Crowe 2'; Swanepoel 5'; Malgraff 29', 54'; Pautz 32'; Hetem 42'

28 July 2019
12:00

Addo Elephants	2-5	Garden Route Gazelles
Rosenberg 12'; Heyns 43'	Report	Beauchamp 6'; Horne 13'; Paton 30'; Arendse 41'; Simmons 47'

28 July 2019
14:00

Mapungubwe Mambas	4-1	Drakensberg Dragons
Raath 4'; M. Cassiem 52'; Gonzalves 55'; Syce 59'	Report	Swanepoel 7'

=== Classification stage ===
Semi-finals
3 August 2019
Drakensberg Dragons	3
Maropeng Cavemen	1
3 August 2019
Mapungubwe Mambas (p.s.o.)	1 (3)
Garden Route Gazelles	1(0)

Final
4 August 2019
Drakensberg Dragons	4
Mapungubwe Mambas	0
Third place
4 August 2019
Maropeng Cavemen	2
Garden Route Gazelles	3

==== Semi-finals ====
3 August 2019
14:00

Drakensberg Dragons	3-1	Maropeng Cavemen
Ntuli 12'; Hetem 36'; Letuka 51'	Report	Buchanan 33'

3 August 2019
16:00

Mapungubwe Mambas	1-1	Garden Route Gazelles
Jonas 6'	Report	Horne 56'
Penalties
Mann (penalty shoot-out scored); M. Cassiem (penalty shoot-out scored); Julius (penalty shoot-out scored)	3-0	(penalty shoot-out missed) Louw; (penalty shoot-out missed) Horne; (penalty shoot-out missed) Simmons

==== Third place game ====
4 August 2019
12:00

Maropeng Cavemen	2-3	Garden Route Gazelles
D. Cassiem 3'; Hezlett 28'	Report	Horne 2'; James 2'; Arendse 34'

==== Final ====
4 August 2019

Drakensberg Dragons	4-0	Mapungubwe Mambas
da Graca 3'; Ntuli 32', 49'; Pautz 34'	Report

== Awards ==
Player of the tournament	Goalkeeper of the tournament	Top goalscorer	Young Player of the tournament
Nqobile Ntuli (Dragons)	Rob Mckinley (Mambas)	Keegan Hezlett (Cavemen)	Mustaphaa Cassiem (Mambas)

== Final ranking ==
Rank	Team
1st place, gold medalist(s)	Drakensberg Dragons
2nd place, silver medalist(s)	Mapungubwe Mambas
3rd place, bronze medalist(s)	Garden Route Gazelles
4	Maropeng Cavemen
5	Addo Elephants
6	Golden Gate Gladiators

== Goalscorers ==
There have been 102 goals scored in 19 matches, for an average of 5.37 goals per match.

5 goals

- Keegan Hezlett (Maropeng Cavemen)

4 goals

- Connor Beauchamp (Garden Route Gazelles)
- Mustaphaa Cassiem (Mapungubwe Mambas)
- Cerezo Comerasamy (Addo Elephants)
- Julian Hykes (Addo Elephants)
- Nqobile Ntuli (Drakensberg Dragons)
- Richard Pautz (Drakensberg Dragons)

3 goals

- Pierre Botma (Drakensberg Dragons)
- Wade Dollman (Mapungubwe Mambas)
- Keenan Horne (Garden Route Gazelles)
- Brandon James (Garden Route Gazelles)
- Ignatius Malgraff (Drakensberg Dragons)
- Sinoxolo Mbekeni (Addo Elephants)
- Marvin Simmons (Garden Route Gazelles)

2 goals

- Reece Arendse (Garden Route Gazelles)
- Berne Burger (Garden Route Gazelles)
- Dayaan Cassiem (Maropeng Cavemen)
- Ryan Crowe (Drakensberg Dragons)
- Miguel da Graca (Drakensberg Dragons)
- Courtney Halle (Maropeng Cavemen)
- Ross Hetem (Drakensberg Dragons)
- Luthando Jonas (Mapungubwe Mambas)
- Tevin Kok (Mapungubwe Mambas)
- Cameron Mackay (Maropeng Cavemen)
- Sam Mvimbi (Golden Gate Gladiators)
- Hans Neethling (Garden Route Gazelles)
- Tumi Ramphele (Golden Gate Gladiators)
- Reza Rosenberg (Addo Elephants)
- Dylan Swanepoel (Drakensberg Dragons)
- Craig Wiid (Maropeng Cavemen)

1 goal

- Idrees Abdulla (Golden Gate Gladiators)
- Michael Abrahams (Maropeng Cavemen)
- Spencer Botes (Maropeng Cavemen)
- Matt Brown (Mapungubwe Mambas)
- Callum Buchanan (Maropeng Cavemen)
- Chad Cairncross (Drakensberg Dragons)
- Chad Futcher (Addo Elephants)
- Ross Gonzalves (Mapungubwe Mambas)
- Gareth Heyns (Addo Elephants)
- Greg Last (Mapungubwe Mambas)
- Amkelwe Letuka (Drakensberg Dragons)
- Lance Louw (Garden Route Gazelles)
- Gerald Mpopo (Maropeng Cavemen)
- Owen Mvimbi (Mapungubwe Mambas)
- Senswesihle Ngubane (Garden Route Gazelles)
- Taine Paton (Garden Route Gazelles)
- Niel Raath (Mapungubwe Mambas)
- Daniel Sibbald (Garden Route Gazelles)
- Caleb Syce (Mapungubwe Mambas)
- Angelo Walstroom (Golden Gate Gladiators)

Source: SAHA

== Attendances ==
The Drakensberg Dragons won the final after beating the Mapungubwe Mambas at the Randburg Hockey Stadium in front of a capacity crowd of 3,000.

#	Club	Average
1	Drakensberg Dragons	178
2	Mapungubwe Mambas	165
3	Garden Route Gazelles	152
4	Maropeng Cavemen	137
5	Addo Elephants	133
6	Golden Gate Gladiators	129
