= 2017 Men's Hockey Africa Cup of Nations squads =

This article lists the confirmed squads for the 2017 Men's Hockey Africa Cup of Nations tournament held in Ismailia, Egypt between 22 and 29 October 2017. The eight national teams were required to register a playing squad of eighteen players and two reserves.

== Egypt ==
The following was the Egypt squad for the 2017 Africa Cup of Nations.

Head coach: Ali Elshorbagy

No.	Pos.	Player	Date of birth (age)	Caps	Club
1	GK	Mohamed Sayed	30		
2		Mohamed Husseinen	29		
3		Mostafa Mansour	24		
4		Karim Atef	25		
5		Amr Ibrahim	25		
6		Ahmed Ezz (C)	36		
7		Ahmed Mohsen	25		
8		Ahmed Gamal	25		
10		Ashraf Said	25		
11		Ahmed Elnaggar	29		
12		Mostafa Ragab	19		
16	GK	Wael Noureldin	23		
17		Amr Elhady	32		
18		Mohamed Ramadan	22		
19		Hamada Atef	29		
21		Ahmed Elganaini	21		
22		Mohamed Zaki	21		
25		Houssam Ghobran	28		

== Ghana ==
The following was the Ghana squad for the 2017 Africa Cup of Nations.

Head coach: Winfred Sackey

No.	Pos.	Player	Date of birth (age)	Caps	Club
1	GK	Jeffrey Karikari	30		
2		Salya Nsalbini (C)	32		
4		Charles Abbiw	29		
5		Stephen Asamoah	24		
6		Samuel Agbelie	21		
7		Elikem Akaba	30		
8		Emmanuel Ankomah	23		
12		George Asiedu	31		
13		Emmanuel Akaba	24		
14		Samuel Afari	23		
15		Ernest Opoku	23		
19		Alfred Ntiamoah	24		
20		Matthew Damalie	24		
22		Michael Baiden	23		
26		Michael Akuamoah-Boateng	28		
27		Luke Damalie	22		
30	GK	Eugene Acheampong	30		
31		Francis Tettey	19		

== Kenya ==
The following was the Kenya squad for the 2017 Africa Cup of Nations.

Head coach: Meshack Senge

No.	Pos.	Player	Date of birth (age)	Caps	Club
1		Festus Onyango	21		
2		Francis Kariuki	21		
3		Allan Iningu	29		
4		Maxwell Wakhungu (C)	28		
5		Samuel Oungo	33		
6		Constant Wakhura	25		
8		Amos Barkibir	22		
9		Richard Birir	37		
11		Oliver Echenje	30		
12		George Mutria	28		
17		Kennedy Munialo	25		
18	GK	Linus Kipkemboi	26		
19		Robert Masibo	23		
20		Francis Esikuri	29		
21		Willis Okeyo		33	
21	GK	Agesa, Allan	27		
23		Vincent Odhiambo	24		
25		Danstone Wabwire	19		

== Nigeria ==
The following was the Nigeria squad for the 2017 Africa Cup of Nations.

Head coach: Babatunde Odedokun

No.	Pos.	Player	Date of birth (age)	Caps	Club
2		Simon Awasa	23		
3		Shamsudeen Bala	27		
6		Femi Afonja	25		
7		Michael John	18		
8		Michael Agbaegbu	27		
9		Kish Victor	19		
10		Muiz Bello	21		
11		Adamu Mamman Kolo (C)	33		
12		Shanwilu Mu'azu	21		
13		Sunday Ogunruku	30		
15		Endurance Nzete	21		
17		Yinka Jayeoba	24		
18		Sikiru Salawu	28		
19		Oluwatosin Fowobaje	32		
20		Victor Faluyi	19		
21		Kelvin Linus	17		
22	GK	Abdulkadir Baba	33		
23	GK	Sani Almustapha	30		

== South Africa ==
The following was the South Africa squad for the 2017 Africa Cup of Nations.

Head coach: Sheldon Rostron

No.	Pos.	Player	Date of birth (age)	Caps	Club
1		Jonathan Robinson	31		KZN Raiders
3		Tyson Dlungwana	20		Southern Gauteng
7		Tim Drummond (C)	29		KZN Raiders
9		Julian Hykes	35		Southern Gauteng
10		Keenan Horne	25		Western Province
11		Lance Louw	31		Southern Gauteng
12		Reza Rosenberg	31		Southern Gauteng
14		Melrick Maddocks	23		Southern Gauteng
17		Dan Sibbald	22		KZN Raiders
18		Taine Paton	28		KZN Raiders
19		Ryan Julius	22		Western Province
20		Tommy Hammond	33		Southern Gauteng
21		Jethro Eustice	27		KZN Raiders
22		Dan Bell	23		Western Province
23	GK	Rassie Pieterse	34		Southern Gauteng
26		Ignatius Malgraff	24		Eastern Province
27		Nqobile Ntuli	21		KZN Raiders
30	GK	Siya Nolutshungu	21		KZN Raiders
