= 2017 Men's Premier Hockey League (South Africa) =

Field hockey championship of South Africa

Tournament details
- Host country: Johannesburg
- City: South Africa
- Dates: 18 July 2019–4 August 2019
- Teams: 6
- Venue: Randburg Hockey Stadium

Final positions
- Champions: –– Maropeng Cavemen
- Runner-up: –– Drakensberg Dragons
- Third place: –– Mapungubwe Mambas

Tournament statistics
- Matches played: 19
- Goals scored: 79 (4.16 per match)
- Top scorer: –– Courtney Halle (5 goals)

The 2017 Men's Premier Hockey League was the 2nd edition of the Premier Hockey League, the annual tournament men's field hockey championship of South Africa.

The Maropeng Cavemen won the tournament for the first time, defeating the Drakensberg Dragons 3–0 in the final.

== Competition format ==
=== Format ===
The 2017 Premier Hockey League followed a single round-robin format, followed by a classification round.

During the pool stage teams played each other once. The top four ranked teams qualified for the Classification Round. Team 1 played Team 4, while Team 2 played Team 3 in the two semi-finals. The two victorious teams moved onto the Final, while the losing teams competed for third place.

=== Point allocation ===
Match points will be distributed as follows:

- 4 points: win by 3+ goals
- 3 points: win and shoot-out win
- 1 point: shoot-out loss
- 0 points: loss

== Participating teams ==
Each squad consists of 20 players, made up of 7 marquee players as determined by SA Hockey's team, with a further 3 players into their 20 from the "new generation" pool featuring the country's most exciting young talent. Coaches were forced to release between 4 and 8 players from the 2017 squads ahead of the draft.

Addo Elephants

Head Coach:

Drakensberg Dragons

Head Coach:

Golden Gate Gladiators

Head Coach:

Garden Route Gazelles

Head Coach:

Maropeng Cavemen

Head Coach:

Mapungubwe Mambas

Head Coach:

== Results ==
=== Pool stage ===
Pos	Team	Pld	W	WD	LD	L	GF	GA	GD	Pts	Qualification
1	–– Maropeng Cavemen	5	4	0	1	0	14	4	+10	13	Semi-Final
2	–– Mapungubwe Mambas	5	3	0	0	2	11	5	+6	9	Semi-Final
3	–– Drakensberg Dragons	5	2	1	1	1	8	6	+2	10	Semi-Final
4	–– Addo Elephants	5	2	0	0	3	10	10	0	6	Semi-Final
5	–– Garden Route Gazelles	5	0	2	0	3	3	13	−10	6	
6	–– Golden Gate Gladiators	5	1	0	1	3	13	21	−8	4	

Source: SA Hockey
Rules for classification: 1) points; 2) matches won; 3) goal difference; 4) goals for; 5) head-to-head result; 6) field goals scored.

==== Matches ====
25 November 2017
08:00

Drakensberg Dragons ––	4-0	–– Addo Elephants
Heyns 23'; Letuka 25'; Swanepoel 0'; Ntuli 48'	Report

25 November 2017
12:00

Maropeng Cavemen ––	0-0	–– Garden Route Gazelles
	Report
Penalties
da Graca (penalty shoot-out missed); Abrahams (penalty shoot-out scored); Gabela (penalty shoot-out missed); Modise (penalty shoot-out missed); Futcher (penalty shoot-out missed)	1-2	(penalty shoot-out missed) Burger; (penalty shoot-out missed) Coombes; (penalty shoot-out scored) Norris-Jones; (penalty shoot-out scored) Julius; (penalty shoot-out missed) Mpopo

25 November 2017
16:00

Golden Gate Gladiators ––	1-6	–– Mapungubwe Mambas
Beauchamp 20'	Report	Abrahams 9'; Scott 0'; Jones 27', 32', 58'; Paulo 43'

26 November 2017
10:00

Maropeng Cavemen ––	3-2	–– Addo Elephants
West 25', 55'; Gabela 44'	Report	Hykes 3'; Malgraff 36'

26 November 2017
12:00

Drakensberg Dragons ––	2-2	–– Golden Gate Gladiators
de Sousa 33'; Heyns 48'	Report	Halle 26'; Beauchamp 55'
Penalties
Maddocks (penalty shoot-out missed) de Sousa (penalty shoot-out missed); Dart (penalty shoot-out scored); Gonzalves (penalty shoot-out scored); Philips (penalty shoot-out scored)	3-1	(penalty shoot-out missed) Coombs; (penalty shoot-out missed) Cassiem; (penalty shoot-out scored) Pike; (penalty shoot-out missed) Hobson

2 December 2017
10:00

Garden Route Gazelles ––	0-3	–– Mapungubwe Mambas
	Report	Pretorius 27'; Last 29'; Buchanan 40'

2 December 2017
14:00

Addo Elephants ––	4-2	–– Golden Gate Gladiators
Christoffels 13'; Mbekeni 16'; Kimfley 26'; Hykes 31'	Report	Beauchamp 53'; Mohlaba 56'

3 December 2017
08:00

Addo Elephants ––	0-1	–– Mapungubwe Mambas
	Report	Last 28'

3 December 2017
12:00

Drakensberg Dragons ––	0-3	–– Maropeng Cavemen
	Report	West 12'; Futcher 24'; Modise 60'

3 December 2017
16:00

Garden Route Gazelles ––	3-6	–– Golden Gate Gladiators
De Voux 3'; James 9'; Norris-Jones 17'	Report	Coombs 21'; Chong 35'; Halle 37', 41'; Pike 40'; Beauchamp 53'

9 December 2017
08:00

Drakensberg Dragons ––	2-1	–– Mapungubwe Mambas
Smith 6'; Heyns 42'	Report	Gonzalves 34'

9 December 2017
12:00

Maropeng Cavemen ––	6-2	–– Golden Gate Gladiators
Comerasamy 5'; Panther 12'; Abrahams 25' da Graca 36'; Robertson 46'; Cleak 56'	Report	Halle 35', 50'

9 December 2017
16:00

Addo Elephants ––	4-0	–– Garden Route Gazelles
Christoffels 9'; Mbekeni 45'; Bosman 57'; Kimfley 59'	Report

10 December 2017
10:00

MC	2-0	–– Mapungubwe Mambas
Futcher 4'; Comerasamy 41'	Report

10 December 2017
14:0

Drakensberg Dragons ––	0-0	–– Garden Route Gazelles
	Report
Penalties
Gonzalves (penalty shoot-out missed); Letuka (penalty shoot-out missed); Dart (penalty shoot-out scored); Ntuli (penalty shoot-out scored)	2-4	(penalty shoot-out scored) de Voux; (penalty shoot-out scored) Coombes; (penalty shoot-out scored) Horne; (penalty shoot-out scored) Mulder

=== Classification stage ===
Semi-finals
11 December 2017
–– Mapungubwe Mambas	2
–– Drakensberg Dragons	5
11 December 2017
–– Maropeng Cavemen	6
–– Addo Elephants	1

Final
12 December 2017
–– Drakensberg Dragons	0
–– Maropeng Cavemen	3
Third place
12 December 2017
–– Mapungubwe Mambas	2
–– Addo Elephants	1

==== Semi-finals ====
11 December 2017
14:00

Mapungubwe Mambas ––	2-5	–– Drakensberg Dragons
Hetem 47'; Paulo 56'	Report	Smith 21', 39' de Sousa 24'; Ntuli 28'; Gonzalves 54'

11 December 2017
16:00

Maropeng Cavemen ––	6-1	–– Addo Elephants
Comerasamy 13'; Louw 27', 43', 54'; Seerane 40'; Abrahams 55'	Report	Malgraff 56'

==== Third place game ====
12 December 2017
15:00

Mapungubwe Mambas ––	2–1	–– Addo Elephants
Mvimbi 3'; Last 9'	Report	Manson 39'

==== Final ====
12 December 2017
19:30

Drakensberg Dragons ––	0-3	–– Maropeng Cavemen
	Report	Cleak 11' da Graca 14'; Abrahams 43'

== Awards ==
Player of the tournament	Goalkeeper of the tournament	Top goalscorer	Young Player of the tournament
–– Miguel da Graca| –– Gowan Jones	–– Courtney Halle	–– Tyson Dlungwana	

== Final ranking ==
Rank	Team
1st place, gold medalist(s)	–– Maropeng Cavemen
2nd place, silver medalist(s)	–– Drakensberg Dragons
3rd place, bronze medalist(s)	–– Mapungubwe Mambas
4	–– Addo Elephants
5	–– Garden Route Gazelles
6	–– Golden Gate Gladiators

== Goalscorers ==
There have been 79 goals scored in 19 matches, for an average of 4.16 goals per match.

5 goals

- –– Courtney Halle

4 goals

- –– Connor Beauchamp

3 goals

- –– Gareth Heyns
- –– Austin Smith
- –– Jarryd Jones
- –– Greg Last
- –– Michael Abrahams
- –– Cerezo Comerasamy
- –– Lance Louw
- –– Ricky West

2 goals

- –– Winray Christoffels
- –– Julian Hykes
- –– Damian Kimfley
- –– Ignatius Malgraff
- –– Sinoxolo Mbekeni
- –– Nqobile Ntuli
- –– Mattew de Sousa
- –– Steven Paulo
- –– Brynn Cleak
- –– Chad Futcher
- –– Miguel da Graca

1 goal

- –– Reberto Bosman
- –– Andrew Manson
- –– Nick Gonzalves
- –– Amkelwe Letuka
- –– Dylan Swanepoel
- –– Brandon James
- –– Lloyd Norris-Jones
- –– Jean-Pierre de Voux
- –– Mark Chong
- –– Laython Coombs
- –– Jacki Mohlaba
- –– Maximilian Pike
- –– Rusten Abrahams
- –– Callum Buchanan
- –– Ross Gonzalves
- –– Ross Hetem
- –– Owen Mvimbi
- –– Francois Pretorius
- –– Winchester Scott
- –– Lungani Gabela
- –– Thabang Modise
- –– Clinton Panther
- –– Brad Robertson
- –– Hendy Seerane

Source: SAHA
