= 2014 Men's Hockey World Cup squads =

This article lists the confirmed squads for the 2014 Men's Hockey World Cup tournament to be held in The Hague, Netherlands between 31 May and 15 June 2014.

== Pool A ==
=== Australia ===
The squad was announced on 28 April 2014.

Head coach: Ric Charlesworth

No.	Player	Pos.	Age
1	Jamie Dwyer		35
2	Liam De Young		32
3	Simon Orchard		27
4	Glenn Turner		29
5	Chris Ciriello		28
6	Robert Hammond		32
9	Mark Knowles (c)		30
11	Eddie Ockenden		27
12	Jake Whetton		22

No.	Player	Pos.	Age
16	Matthew Gohdes		24
17	Aran Zalewski		23
19	Tim Deavin		29
20	Matthew Swann		24
24	Tyler Lovell	GK	26
27	Kieran Govers		26
30	Andrew Charter	GK	27
31	Fergus Kavanagh		28
32	Jeremy Hayward		21

=== Belgium ===
The squad was announced on 24 May 2014.

Head coach: Marc Lammers

No.	Player	Pos.	Age
2	Xavier Reckinger		30
3	Jeremy Gucassoff	GK	25
4	Arthur Van Doren		19
6	Dorian Thiery		20
7	John-John Dohmen		26
8	Florent van Aubel		22
9	Sébastien Dockier		24
10	Cédric Charlier		26
15	Emmanuel Stockbroekx		20

No.	Player	Pos.	Age
17	Thomas Briels		26
19	Félix Denayer		24
21	Vincent Vanasch	GK	26
22	Simon Gougnard		23
23	Alexandre De Saedeleer		26
27	Tom Boon		24
28	Jérôme Truyens (c)		26
29	Elliot Van Strydonck		25
32	Tanguy Cosyns		22

=== England ===
The squad was announced on 13 May 2014.

Head coach: Bobby Crutchley

No.	Player	Pos.	Age
1	George Pinner	GK	27
2	James Bailey	GK	23
6	Henry Weir		24
7	Ashley Jackson		26
8	Simon Mantell		30
9	Harry Martin		21
11	Alastair Brogdon		26
12	Michael Hoare		28
14	Mark Gleghorne		29

No.	Player	Pos.	Age
16	Adam Dixon		27
18	Barry Middleton (c)		30
20	Dan Shingles		27
21	Tim Whiteman		27
22	David Condon		22
23	Tom Carson		23
24	Iain Lewers		30
26	Nicholas Catlin		25
27	Dan Fox		31

=== India ===
The squad was announced on 14 May 2014.

Head coach: Terry Walsh

No.	Player	Pos.	Age
1	Harjot Singh	GK	20
3	Rupinder Pal Singh		23
5	Kothajit Singh		21
7	Manpreet Singh		21
8	Sardara Singh (c)		27
9	Yuvraj Walmiki		24
10	Dharamvir Singh		23
11	Mandeep Singh		22
12	V. R. Raghunath		25

No.	Player	Pos.	Age
13	Gurbaj Singh		25
14	Lalit Upadhyay		20
15	S. K. Uthappa		22
16	Sreejesh Ravindran	GK	28
24	S. V. Sunil		25
26	Birendra Lakra		24
27	Akashdeep Singh		19
28	Jasjit Singh		24
29	Chinglensana Singh		22

=== Malaysia ===
Head coach: Muhammad Dhaarma Raj

No.	Player	Pos.	Age
1	Roslan Jamaluddin	GK	35
6	Marhan Jalil	MF	24
7	Fitri Saari	MF	21
9	Hafifi Hanafi	FW	28
10	Faizal Saari	FW	23
11	Shahrun Nabil	MF	28
12	Sukri Mutalib	DF	28
13	Firhan Ashaari	FW	21
14	Azlan Misron (c)	DF	31

No.	Player	Pos.	Age
15	Nabil Fiqri	MF	27
16	Kumar Subramaniam	GK	34
17	Razie Rahim	DF	26
18	Faiz Helmi	MF	22
23	Tengku Ahmad Tajuddin	FW	28
26	Shahril Saabah	FW	20
28	Ramadhan Rosil	MF	23
30	Izad Jamaluddin	DF	20
31	Ismail Abu	FW	30

=== Spain ===
The squad was announced on 18 May 2014.

Head coach: Salvador Indurain

No.	Player	Pos.	Age
1	Francisco Cortés	GK	31
2	Santi Freixa (c)		31
3	Sergi Enrique		26
5	Bosco Pérez-Pla		26
7	Miguel Delas		30
8	Viçens Ruiz		22
10	Eduard Tubau		33
11	Roc Oliva		24
13	Ramón Alegre		33

No.	Player	Pos.	Age
14	Gabriel Dabanch		26
17	Xavi Lleonart		23
18	Andrés Mir		27
19	Marc Salles		27
20	Salva Piera		23
21	Álex Casasayas		26
22	Manel Terraza		24
23	David Alegre		29
25	Mario Fernández	GK	22

== Pool B ==
=== Argentina ===
The squad was announced on 6 May 2014.

Head coach: Carlos Retegui

No.	Player	Pos.	Age
1	Juan Manuel Vivaldi	GK	34
2	Gonzalo Peillat		21
4	Juan Ignacio Gilardi		32
5	Pedro Ibarra		28
8	Lucas Rey (c)		31
9	Pablo Trevisan		27
10	Matías Paredes		32
11	Joaquin Menini		22
12	Lucas Vila		27

No.	Player	Pos.	Age
13	Lucas Martinez		20
14	Guillermo Schickendantz		34
17	Juan Martín López		29
18	Guido Barreiros		24
22	Matias Rey		29
24	Manuel Brunet		28
26	Agustín Mazzilli		24
27	Lucas Rossi		28
31	Agustín Abratte	GK	28

=== Germany ===
The squad was announced on 18 May 2014.

Head coach: Markus Weise

No.	Player	Pos.	Age
1	Nicolas Jacobi	GK	27
3	Linus Butt		27
4	Maximilian Müller (c)		26
6	Martin Häner		25
8	Mats Grambusch		21
10	Christopher Wesley		26
13	Tobias Hauke		26
14	Jan-Philipp Rabente		26
15	Benjamin Weß		28

No.	Player	Pos.	Age
16	Pilt Arnold		25
17	Christopher Rühr		20
18	Oliver Korn		29
19	Christopher Zeller		29
20	Martin Zwicker		27
23	Florian Fuchs		22
24	Benedikt Fürk		25
26	Thilo Stralkowski		26
30	Felix Reuß	GK	23

=== Netherlands ===
The squad was announced on 13 May 2014.

Head coach: Paul van Ass

No.	Player	Pos.	Age
1	Jaap Stockmann	GK	29
3	Floris van der Linden		25
4	Klaas Vermeulen		26
5	Marcel Balkestein		33
7	Wouter Jolie		28
8	Billy Bakker		25
10	Valentin Verga		24
11	Jeroen Hertzberger		28
12	Robbert Kemperman		23

No.	Player	Pos.	Age
13	Sander Baart		26
20	Jelle Galema		21
22	Rogier Hofman		27
23	Sander de Wijn		24
24	Robert van der Horst (c)		29
25	Seve van Ass		22
26	Pirmin Blaak	GK	26
27	Constantijn Jonker		26
30	Mink van der Weerden		25

=== New Zealand ===
The squad was announced on 21 May 2014.

Head coach: Colin Batch

No.	Player	Pos.	Age
4	Nick Haig		27
5	Andy Hayward		28
6	Simon Child		26
8	Dean Couzins (c)		32
9	Blair Hilton		24
13	Marcus Child		23
14	Jared Panchia		20
16	Hamish McGregor	GK	26
18	Phil Burrows		34

No.	Player	Pos.	Age
19	Alex Shaw		24
20	Devon Manchester	GK	24
21	Kane Russell		22
22	Blair Tarrant		24
24	Arun Panchia		25
25	Shea McAleese		29
27	Stephen Jenness		23
29	Hugo Inglis		23
31	Steve Edwards		28

=== South Africa ===
The squad was announced on 9 May 2014.

Head coach: Fabian Gregory

No.	Player	Pos.	Age
1	Jonathan Robinson		27
2	Wade Paton		28
4	Lloyd Madsen		27
5	Austin Smith (c)		29
7	Timothy Drummond		26
8	Dylan Swanepoel		20
9	Julian Hykes		31
10	Lloyd Norris-Jones		28
14	Rhett Halkett		28

No.	Player	Pos.	Age
19	Jean-Pierre de Voux		28
21	Jethro Eustice		24
22	Lungile Tsolekile		30
23	Erasmus Pieterse	GK	30
25	Justin Reid-Ross		27
26	Ignatius Malgraff		21
30	Taine Paton		25
31	Taine Panther		23
32	Gowan Jones	GK	24

=== South Korea ===
Head coach: Shin Seok-kyo

No.	Player	Pos.	Age
1	Lee Myung-ho	GK	34
5	Oh Dae-keun		32
6	Lee Nam-yong		30
7	Kang Moon-kweon		26
8	Lee Seung-il (c)		31
9	Yoon Sung-hoon		31
10	You Hyo-sik		32
12	Jung Man-jae		23
13	Kang Moon-kyu		26

No.	Player	Pos.	Age
14	Hyun Hye-sung		27
16	Kim Jae-hyeon	GK	26
17	Hong Eun-seong		31
19	Kim Young-jin		29
21	Lee Seung-hoon		29
22	Kim Seong-kyu		27
25	Jang Jong-hyun		30
27	Jeon Byung-jin		24
32	Nam Hyun-woo		26
