= Maropeng Cavemen =

South Africa field hockey club

- Full name: Maropeng Cavemen
- Nickname(s): Cavemen
- League: Premier Hockey League
- Founded: 2016
Home

Maropeng Cavemen is a South Africa field hockey club. The club was established in 2016, and is one of 6 established to compete in South African Hockey Association's new premier domestic competition, Premier Hockey League.

== History ==
The Maropeng Cavemen have been inspired by famous tourist areas in Maropeng Visitors Centre, Cradle of Humankind in Gauteng.

== Tournament history ==
=== Premier Hockey League ===
- 2016 - (gold)
- 2017 - (gold)
- 2018 - 4th
- 2019 - 4th

== Teams ==
The men's team was announced on 10 July 2019.

Head Coach: Mark Sanders

2. Dayaan Cassiem
3. Gerald Mpopo
4. James Watters
5. Michael Abrahams
6. Lethu Thomo
7. Cameron Mackay
8. Spencer Botes
9. Mark Chong
11. Keegan Hezlett
12. Callum Buchanan
13. Nicholas Pio
14. Donovan Cheng
15. Clinton Panther
17. Joshua Finlay
18. Nduduzo Lembethe
19. Brynn Cleak
20. Adrian Abrahams
21. Courtney Halle
23. Rassie Pieterse
25. Craig Wiid
