= Siphesihle Ntuli =

South Africa field hockey coach

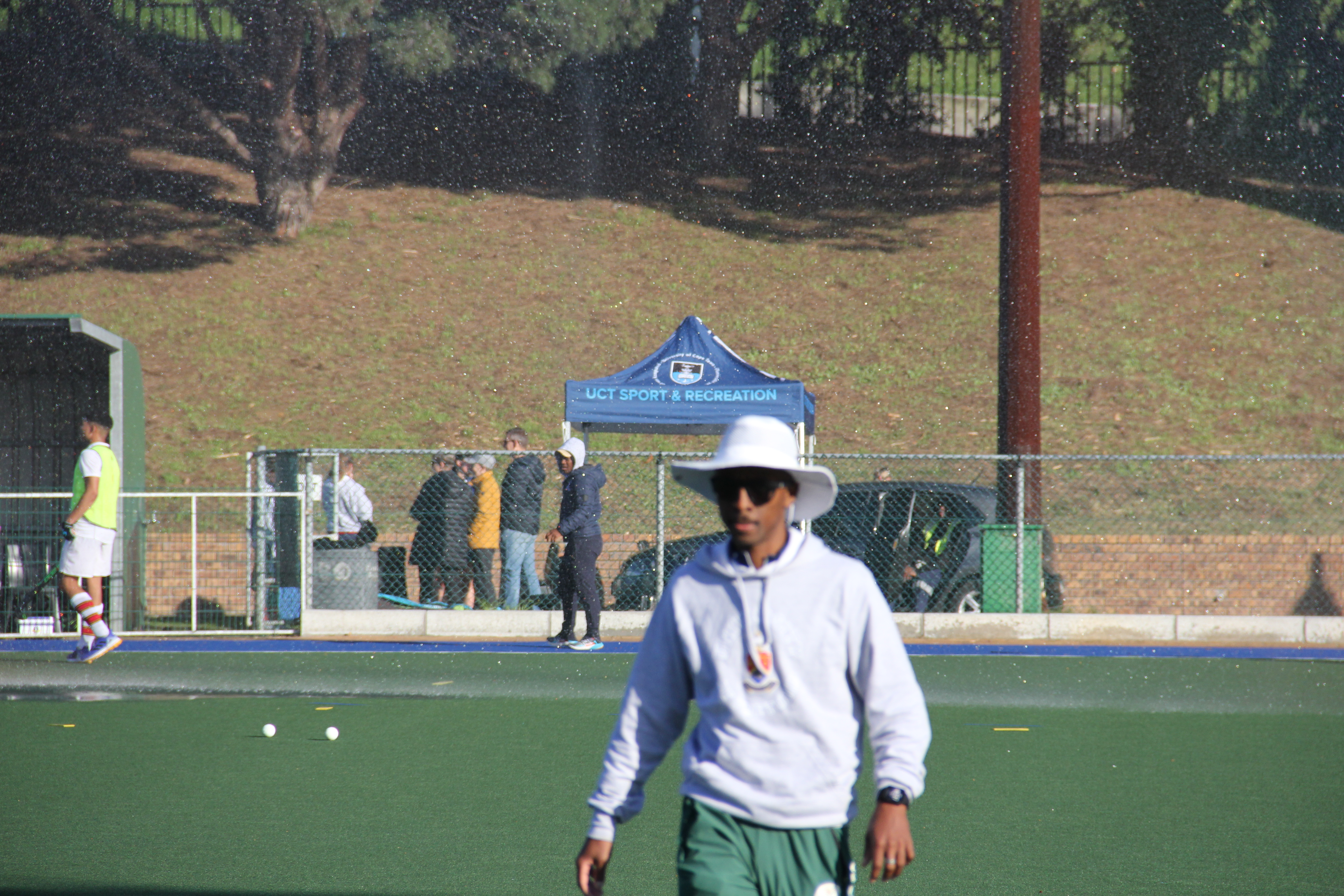
- Coach, Tuks Men's Team
- Education: Kearsney College
- Family: Nqobile Ntuli (brother)
- Field hockey career
- Sport: Field hockey
Coaching career
- Years: Team
- 2018: South Africa U18
- 2021: South Africa U21
- 2018-present: University of Pretoria
- 2016-2019: Drakensberg Dragons
- 2025–present: South Africa
Medal record
Representing South Africa
African Youth Games
| Gold medal – first place | 2018 Algiers |

Siphesihle 'Sihle' Ntuli is a South African field hockey coach. At the 2020 Summer Olympics, he assistant coached the South Africa men's national field hockey team and coached the South Africa Men's Junior World Cup.

He brother, Nqobile Ntuli, also represents South Africa in field hockey.

He will coach as Head Coach of the South African Men's Hockey Team.

== Coach ==
=== Club ===
- 2018, University of KwaZulu-Natal - Men field hockey (head coach)
- 2018–present, University of Pretoria - Men field hockey (head coach)
- 2016–2018, Drakensberg Dragons (head coach)
  - 2016 (bronze)
  - 2017 (silver)
  - 2018 (gold)
  - 2019 (gold)

=== South Africa ===
- 2018, South Africa U18 (head coach)
  - African Youth Games 2018 (gold)
- 2021, South Africa U21 (head coach)
  - 2021 Men's FIH Hockey Junior World Cup, 9th
- 2018–present, South Africa (assistant coach)

Sporting positions
| Preceded by Cheslyn Gie | South Africa National Field Hockey Head Coach; 2025–present | Incumbent |
