= Premier Hockey League (South Africa) =

Field Hockey competition in South Africa

- Sport: Field hockey
- Founded: 2016
- No. of teams: 6
- Country: South Africa

The Premier Hockey League (PHL) is a field hockey competition organised by South African Hockey Association.

== Format ==
All matches for PHL will be played at the Randburg Hockey Stadium in Johannesburg – on a Saturday and Sunday. The event consists of a league stage and a play-off stage: Each team will play each other once in the league stage. This means each team will play 5 games. The teams who finish 5th and 6th respectively in the log, at the end of the league stage, will be knocked out of the competition. The top four teams in the log will progress to the semi-finals. The losing semi-finalists will play-off for 3rd and 4th respectively and the winning semi-finalists will progress to the finals of the men’s and women’s competitions.

The team identities have been inspired by famous tourist areas in South Africa and are representative of all nine Provinces.

=== Teams ===
==== Men ====
Caption
Team	famous tourist	Provinces
–– Addo Elephants	Addo Elephant National Park	Eastern Cape
–– Drakensberg Dragons	uKhahlamba-Drakensberg Park	KwaZulu-Natal
–– Garden Route Gazelles	Garden Route	Western Cape
–– Golden Gate Gladiators	Golden Gate Highlands National Park	Free State
–– Mapungubwe Mambas	Mapungubwe National Park	Limpopo
–– Maropeng Cavemen	Maropeng Visitors Centre, Cradle of Humankind	Gauteng

==== Women ====
Caption
Team	famous tourist	Provinces
–– Blyde River Bunters	Blyde River Canyon Nature Reserve	Mpumalanga
–– Madikwe Rangers	Madikwe Game Reserve	North West Province
–– Namaqualand Daisies	Namaqua National Park	Northern Cape
–– Orange River Rafters	Orange River	Free State; Northern Cape
–– St. Lucia Lakers	Lake St. Lucia	KwaZulu-Natal
–– Wineland Wings	South Africa wine	Western Cape

== Men's tournament ==
=== Summaries ===
Year	Gold Medal Match			Third and Fourth		
Year	Champions	Score	Runners-up	3rd place	Score	4th place
2016	–– Maropeng Cavemen	2–0	–– Addo Elephants	–– Golden Gate Gladiators	3–1	–– Garden Route Gazelles
2017	–– Maropeng Cavemen	3–0	–– Drakensberg Dragons	–– Mapungubwe Mambas	2–1	–– Addo Elephants
2018	–– Drakensberg Dragons	2–0	–– Addo Elephants	–– Garden Route Gazelles	2–2 (0–2) penalty shootout	–– Maropeng Cavemen
2019	–– Drakensberg Dragons	4–0	–– Mapungubwe Mambas	–– Garden Route Gazelles	3–2	–– Maropeng Cavemen

=== Awards ===
Year	Player of the tournament	Goalkeeper of the tournament	Top goalscorer	Young Player of the tournament
2016			–– Ignatius Malgraff	
2017	–– Miguel da Graca	–– Gowan Jones	–– Courtney Halle	–– Tyson Dlungwana
2018	–– Jethro Eustice	–– Siya Nolutshungu	–– Richard Pautz	–– Peter Jarvis
2019	–– Nqobile Ntuli	–– Rob Mckinley	–– Keegan Hezlett	–– Mustaphaa Cassiem

== Women's tournament ==
=== Summaries ===
Year	Gold Medal Match			Third and Fourth		
Year	Champions	Score	Runners-up	3rd place	Score	4th place
2016	–– Blyde River Bunters	2–0	–– Madikwe Rangers	–– Wineland Wings	3–2	–– St. Lucia Lakers
2017	–– Orange River Rafters	0–0 (2–3) penalty shootout	–– St. Lucia Lakers	–– Blyde River Bunters	1–0	–– Namaqualand Daisies
2018	–– Blyde River Bunters	1–0	–– Madikwe Rangers	–– St. Lucia Lakers	3–0	–– Orange River Rafters
2019	–– Madikwe Rangers	1–1 (3–2) penalty shootout	–– Wineland Wings	–– Orange River Rafters	4–1	–– Namaqualand Daisies

=== Awards ===
Year	Player of the tournament	Goalkeeper of the tournament	Top goalscorer	Young Player of the tournament
2016			–– Jacinta Jubb	
2017	–– Kristen Paton	–– Nicole La Fleur	–– Sulette Damons –– Tiffany Jones	–– Ongi Mali
2018	–– Kara-Lee Botes	–– Phumelela Mbande	–– Carmen Smith	–– Lezaan Jansen van Vuuren
2019	–– Lisa-Marie Deetlefs	–– Mmatshepo Modipane	–– Sylvia van Jaarsveldt	–– Bianca Wood

== Broadcasting ==
- SuperSport

== See also ==
- Hockey India League
- Hockey One
