= Drakensberg Dragons =

South African field hockey club

- Full name: Drakensberg Dragons
- Nickname(s): Dragons
- League: Premier Hockey League
- Founded: 2016

Personnel
- Coach: Siphesihle Ntuli
Home

Drakensberg Dragons is a South Africa field hockey club. The club was established in 2016, and is one of 6 established to compete in South African Hockey Association's new premier domestic competition, Premier Hockey League.

== History ==
The Drakensberg Dragons have been inspired by famous tourist areas in uKhahlamba-Drakensberg Park in KwaZulu-Natal.

== Tournament history ==
=== Premier Hockey League ===
- 2016 - 6th
- 2017 - (silver)
- 2018 - (gold)
- 2019 - (gold)

== Teams ==
The men's team was announced on 10 July 2019.

Head Coach: Siphesihle Ntuli

2. Jethro Eustice (C)
3. Ross Hetem
4. Cody van Wyk
5. Melrick Maddocks
6. Dylan Swanepoel
8. Suubi Mugerwa-Sekawabe
9. Amkelwe Letuka
10. Nqobile Ntuli
11. Trevor de Lora
12. Chad Cairncross
15. Ignatius Malgraff
16. Mattew de Sousa
17. Miguel da Graca
18. Francois Pretorius
19. Ryan Crowe
20. Richard Pautz
21. Pierre Botma
23. Andile Ndlovu
24. Cameron Ryan
31. Gowan Jones (C, GK)
31. Sizwe Mthembu (GK)
