= Garreth Ewing =

South Africa field hockey coach

Personal information
- Born: 13 March 1974 (age 52)
- Height: 188 cm (6 ft 2 in)

Sport
- Sport: Field hockey
Coaching career
- Years: Team
- 2016-2018: Golden Gate Gladiators (U21)
- 2019-2022: South African
Medal record
Representing South Africa
Africa Cup of Nations
Gold medal – first place	2022 Accra

Garreth Ewing (born 13 March 1974) is a South African field hockey coach. He coached the South African national team at the 2020 Summer Olympics where the team famously defeated World Number 5 Germany.

Garreth Ewing resigned as his role as head coach of the SA Hockey Men following the completion of the Azlan Shah Cup in Malaysia.
