= South Africa national field hockey team =

South Africa national field hockey team may refer to:

- South Africa men's national field hockey team
- South Africa women's national field hockey team
