= Mapungubwe Mambas =

South Africa field hockey club

- Full name: Mapungubwe Mambas
- Nickname(s): Mambas
- League: Premier Hockey League
- Founded: 2016

Personnel
- Coach: Lungile Tsolekile
Home

Mapungubwe Mambas is a South African field hockey club. The club was established in 2016, and is one of 6 established to compete in South African Hockey Association's new premier domestic competition, Premier Hockey League.

== History ==
The Mapungubwe Mambas have been inspired by famous tourist areas in Mapungubwe National Park in Limpopo.

== Tournament history ==
=== Premier Hockey League ===
- 2016 - 5th
- 2017 - (bronze)
- 2018 - 6th
- 2019 - (silver)

== Teams ==
The men's team was announced on 10 July 2019.

Head Coach: Lungile Tsolekile

1. Rob Mckinley (GK)
6. Luthando Jonas
7. Ryan Mann
9. Wade Dollman
10. Tevin Kok
11. Owen Mvimbi (C)
12. Caleb Syce
13. Cole Walbrugh
14. Niel Raath
15. Greg Last (C)
16. Mjekejwa Mohlaba
17. Michael Marki
18. Ross Gonzalves
19. Ryan Julius
20. Damian Kimfley
21. Matt Brown (field hockey)
22. Tommy Hammond
24. Mustaphaa Cassiem
25. Robin Jones
0. Bulelani Ngqukuvana
