= Matthew Guise-Brown =

South African field hockey player

Personal information
- Born: 13 September 1991 (age 34) Pietermaritzburg, South Africa
- Height: 179 cm (5 ft 10 in)
- Weight: 81 kg (179 lb)

Sport
- Sport: Field hockey
- Position: Defender
Senior career
Years	Team	Caps	Goals
2017–2026	Hampstead & Westminster	-	-
–	Tuks	-	-
National team
Years	Team	Caps	Goals
2013–present	South Africa	61	(62)
Medal record
Africa Cup of Nations
Gold medal – first place	2022 Accra

Matthew Guise-Brown (born 13 September 1991) is a South African field hockey player. He competed in the 2020 Summer Olympics.

== Personal life ==
Guise-Brown is also a coach, working as a PE teacher at St. Anthony's School for Boys in North London.

== Honours ==
=== International ===
- 2015 Men's African Olympic Qualifier – The top scorer
