= Cheslyn Gie =

South African field hockey coach

Personal information
- Born: 30 July 1974 (age 52)

Sport
- Sport: Field hockey
Coaching career
- Years: Team
- 2016–2019: Addo Elephants
- –2029: Madibaz
- 2019–2022: South African (Assistant Coach)
- 2022–2024: South African

Cheslyn Gie is a South African field hockey coach who coached the South African national team at the 2022 Africa Cup of Nations and 2023 World FIH Hockey He will coach in the 2024 Summer Olympics.

Cheslyn Gie resigned as his role as head coach of the SA Hockey Men following the completion of the 2024 Summer Olympics.

Sporting positions
Preceded by Garreth Ewing	South Africa National Field Hockey Head Coach; 2023–2024	Succeeded by Siphesihle Ntuli
