= Golden Gate Gladiators =

South African field hockey club

- Full name: Golden Gate Gladiators
- Nickname(s): Gladiators
- League: Premier Hockey League
- Founded: 2016

Personnel
- Coach: Neville Rothman
Home

Golden Gate Gladiators is a South Africa field hockey club. The club was established in 2016, and is one of 6 established to compete in South African Hockey Association's new premier domestic competition, Premier Hockey League.

== History ==
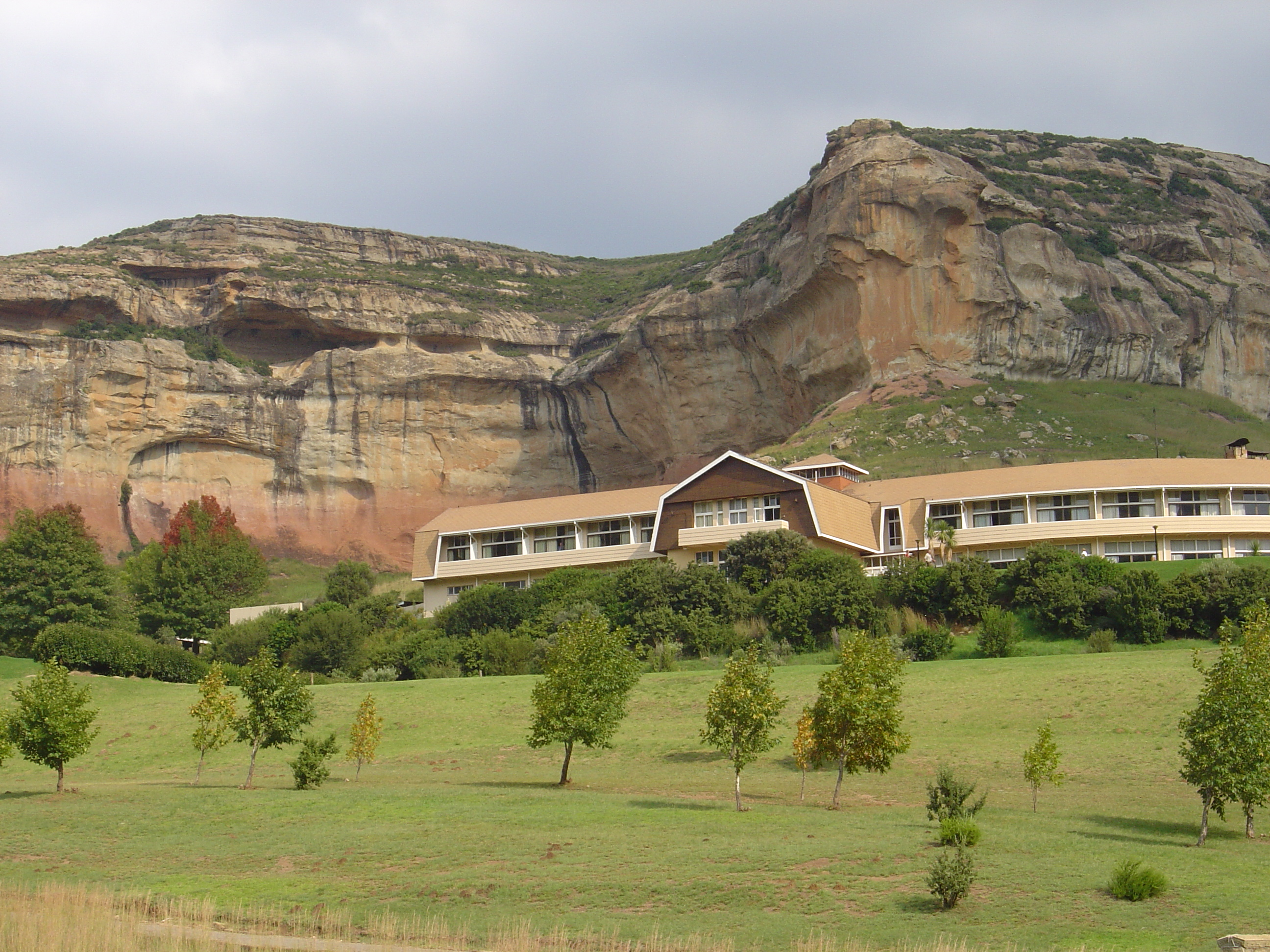
Golden Gate Hotel in the Golden Gate Highlands National Park

The Golden Gate Gladiators have been inspired by famous tourist areas in Golden Gate Highlands National Park in Free State.

== Tournament history ==
=== Premier Hockey League ===
- 2016 - (bronze)
- 2017 - 6th
- 2018 - (bronze)
- 2019 - (bronze)

== Teams ==
The men's team was announced on 10 July 2019.

Head Coach:Neville Rothman

1. Taine Bird
5. Mpumelelo Maphumula
7. Tumi Ramphele
8. Angelo Walstroom
9. Tevin Peterson
10. Luke Wynford
11. Idrees Abdulla
12. Michael Horan
13. Matthew Dewar
14. Jared Campbell
16. Michael van den Berg
17. Guy Morgan
18. Michael Newland-nel
19. Sam Mvimbi
20. Peter Jarvis
21. Jacques van Tonder
23. Clayton Saker
26. Bayanda Simetu
31. Kyle Coker
