= Timothy Drummond =

South African field hockey player (born 1988)

Tim Drummond
Personal information
- Full name: Timothy James Drummond
- Born: 5 March 1988 (age 38) Cape Town, South Africa
- Height: 1.78 m (5 ft 10 in)
- Weight: 81 kg (179 lb)

Sport
- Sport: Field hockey
- Position: Midfielder
- Club: HDM
Senior career
| Years | Team | Caps | Goals |
| 2011–2013 | SCHC | - | - |
| –2021 | Klein Zwitserland | - | - |
| 2021–present | HDM | - | - |
National team
| Years | Team | Caps | Goals |
| 2012–2023 | South Africa | 163 | (16) |
Medal record
Men's field hockey
Representing South Africa
Africa Cup of Nations
| Gold medal – first place | 2013 Nairobi |
| Gold medal – first place | 2017 Ismaili |
| Gold medal – first place | 2022 Accra |
- Updated on 26 May 2022

Timothy James Drummond (born 5 March 1988), also known as Tim Drummond, is a South African field hockey player who plays as a midfielder for Dutch club HDM and the South African national team.

At the 2012 Summer Olympics, he competed for the national team in the men's tournament. Drummond was educated at Hilton College.

In 2023, he announced his retirement from International Hockey.

== Club career ==
Drummond spent several years in England playing for Henley Hockey Club. In 2011, he joined SCHC in the Netherlands, where he played for two seasons. He also played for Klein Zwitserland in the Dutch Hoofdklasse. In the summer of 2021, he left Klein Zwitserland to join HDM, which competes in the Dutch second division.

== Personal life ==
In 2022, he married Dutch field hockey player Eva de Goede.
