= Le-Neal Jackson =

South African field hockey player

Personal information
- Born: 30 September 1994 (age 31) Queenstown, South Africa

Sport
- Sport: Field hockey
- Position: Defender
National team
Years	Team	Caps	Goals
2020-present	South Africa	34	(2)
Medal record
Africa Cup of Nations
Gold medal – first place	2022 Accra
- Updated on 15 November 2022

Le-Neal Jackson (birth 30 September 1994) is a South African field hockey player.

== International career ==
Jackson made his debut for the test, RSA v USA in Durban. Shortly after this announcement, he was also named in the squad for the 2022 African Cup of Nations and the Commonwealth Games in Birmingham.

== Personal life ==
Jackson attended Queen's College Boys' High School, and University of Johannesburg.
