= Sheldon Rostron =

South African field hockey coach

Sheldon Rostron is a South African field hockey coach.

He coached the team at the 2018 Women's Hockey World Cup.
