= Daniel Bell (field hockey) =

South African field hockey player

Personal information
- Born: 28 September 1990 (age 36) Johannesburg, South Africa

Sport
- Sport: Field hockey
- Position: Defender
- Club: Beerschot
Senior career
Years	Team	Caps	Goals
2015–2018	Gantoise	-	-
2019–2024	Daring	-	-
2024–present	Beerschot	-	-
National team
Years	Team	Caps	Goals
2015–present	South Africa	71	(11)
Medal record
Africa Cup of Nations
Gold medal – first place	2017 Ismailia
Gold medal – first place	2022 Accra

Daniel Bell OLY (born 28 September 1990) is a South African field hockey player who plays as a defender for Belgian Hockey League club Beerschot and the South African national team.

He competed in the 2020 Summer Olympics.

== Club career ==
Bell moved to Europe in 2015 to play for Gantoise in the Belgian second division. He was immediately promoted and then stayed at Gantoise until 2019 when he joined his current club Royal Daring. He played for five years for Daring before joining Beerschot in 2024.
