= Lungile Tsolekile =

South African field hockey player

- Born: 19 April 1984 (age 42); Cape Town, South Africa
- Relatives: Thami Tsolekile (Cousin)
- Field hockey career
- Height: 176 cm (5 ft 9 1/2 in)
- Sport: Field hockey
- Club: Langa Hockey Club
Senior career
Years	Team	Caps	Goals
?-2017	Western Province	-	-
2016	Garden Route Gazelles	-	-
National team
Years	Team	Caps	Goals
2000-2014	South Africa	102	(4)
Coaching career
- 2018: Mapungubwe Mambas
- 2021-: Maties (Assistant Coach)
Medal record
Africa Cup of Nations
Gold medal – first place	2005 Pretoria
- Updated on 10 January 2022

Lungile Tsolekile (born 19 April 1984) is a South African field hockey player who competed in the 2008 Summer Olympics.

He was head coach of the Mapungubwe Mambas in the Men's Premier Hockey League in 2019.
