= Connor Beauchamp =

South African field hockey & cricket player (b.1997)

Personal information
- Born: 20 June 1997 (age 29)

Sport
- Sport: Field hockey
- Position: Defender
- Club: Central
Senior career
Years	Team	Caps	Goals
2017	Golden Gate Gladiators	-	-
2018-2019	Garden Route Gazelles	-	-
National team
Years	Team	Caps	Goals
2022-present	South African	19	(7)

Connor Beauchamp (birth 20 June 1997) is a South African field hockey and cricket player who plays as the South African national team.

== International career ==
He competed in the 2021–22 Men's FIH Pro League Shortly after this announcement, he was also named in the squad for the Commonwealth Games in Birmingham.

== Personal life ==
Beauchamp attended St Stithians College and studied at the Stellenbosch University.
