= Tyson Dlungwana =

South African field hockey player

Personal information
- Full name: Tyson Sbongumenzi Meluleki Dlungwana
- Born: 18 February 1997 (age 29)

Sport
- Sport: Field hockey
- Position: Defender
- Club: PJB
Senior career
Years	Team	Caps	Goals
2022-present	PJB	-	-
-2021	Phoenix Hockey Club	-	-
National team
Years	Team	Caps	Goals
2014	South Africa U18	12	-
2016	South Africa U21	14	(1)
2016–present	South Africa	54	(0)
Medal record
Men's field hockey
Representing South Africa
Africa Cup of Nations
Gold medal – first place	2017 Ismailia
Gold medal – first place	2022 Accra
Junior Africa Cup
Silver medal – second place	2016 Windhoek

Tyson Sbongumenzi Meluleki Dlungwana (born 18 February 1997) is a South African field hockey player, who plays as a defender. He competed in the 2020 Summer Olympics.
