= South Africa men's national under-18 field hockey team =

South African hockey tournament

South Africa
- Association: South African Hockey Association
- Confederation: AfHF (Africa)
Home	Away

Youth Olympic Games
- Appearances: 1 (first in 2014)
- Best result: 4th (2014)

African Youth Games
- Appearances: 1 (first in 2014)
- Best result: 1st (2014)

The South Africa men's national under-18 field hockey team represents South Africa at international field hockey matches and tournaments.

== Tournament record ==
=== Youth Olympic Games ===
2014 - 4th

=== African Youth Games ===
2018 - (gold)

== Current squad ==
The squad was announced on 27 June 2018.

Head coach: Sihle Ntuli

1. Taine Bird
2. Guy Morgan
3. Codie Posthumus
4. Mustapha Cassiem
5. Mphumelelo Maphumulo
6. Matthew Lewis
7. Jared Campbell
8. Peter Jarvis
9. Luke Wynford

== See also ==
- South Africa women's national under-18 field hockey team
- South Africa men's national field hockey team
- South Africa men's national under-21 field hockey team
