= Harjot Singh =

Indian field hockey player (born 1994)

Personal information
- Born: 26 January 1994 (age 32) Amloh, Fatehgarh Sahib, Punjab, India

Sport
- Sport: Field hockey
- Position: Goalkeeper
National team
Years	Team	Caps	Goals
2013–present	India		-
Medal record
Men's field hockey
Representing India
Hockey World League
Bronze medal – third place	2014–15 Raipur	Team
- Updated on 5 August 2017

Harjot Singh (born 26 January 1994) is an Indian field hockey player who plays as a goalkeeper. He represented India at the 2013 Men's Hockey Junior World Cup and the 2014 Men's Hockey World Cup.
