= Owen Mvimbi =

South African field hockey player

Personal information
- Born: Lonwabo Owen Mvimbi; 5 January 1988 (age 38) Soweto, Johannesburg
- Height: 172 cm (5 ft 7 1/2 in)
- Weight: 75

Sport
- Sport: Field hockey
- Position: Midfield
- Club: Jeppe
Senior career
Years	Team	Caps	Goals
2016-2019	Mapungubwe Mambas	24	-
National team
Years	Team	Caps	Goals
2014-present	South Africa	53	(3)
Medal record
Men's field hockey
Representing South Africa
Africa Cup of Nations
Gold medal – first place	2022 Accra
- Updated on FIH at 6 Feb 2022

Lonwabo Owen Mvimbi (birth 5 Jan 1988) is a South African field hockey player who plays for the South African national team.

== Club career ==
Current club Jeppe

== International career ==
Mvimbi made his South Africa debut when he played in the test at Germany. He earned his 50th test cap in Namibia. He competed in the 2020 Africa Cup of Nations and 2018 Commonwealth Games.
