= Nqobile Ntuli =

South African field hockey player

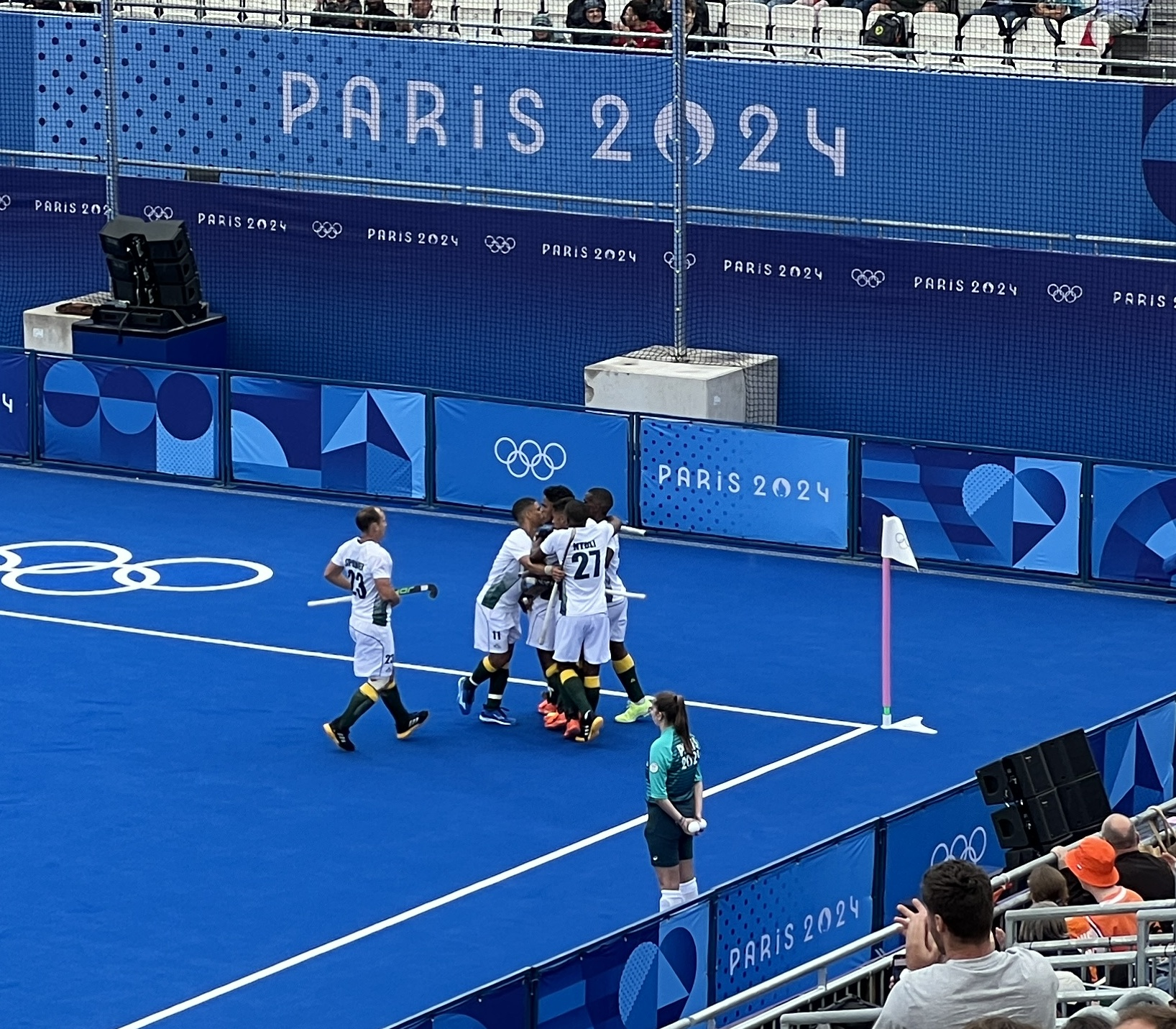
- Netherlands vs. South Africa, 2024 Summer Olympic

Personal information
- Full name: Nqobile Mansuet Ntuli
- Born: 15 January 1996 (age 30)
- Height: 179 cm (5 ft 10 in)
- Weight: 75 kg (165 lb)

Sport
- Sport: Field hockey
- Position: Forward
- Club: Harvestehude
Senior career
Years	Team	Caps	Goals
?-2019	Tuks	-	-
2017-2019	Drakensberg Dragons	21	-
2019–present	Harvestehude	-	-
National team
Years	Team	Caps	Goals
2014	South Africa U18	12	(16)
2016	South Africa U21	15	-
2016–present	South Africa	100	(63)
Medal record
Men's field hockey
Representing South Africa
Africa Cup of Nations
Gold medal – first place	2017 Ismailia
Gold medal – first place	2022 Accra
Junior African Cup
Silver medal – second place	2016 Windhoek
- Updated on 5 June 2024

Nqobile 'Bili' Mansuet Ntuli (born 15 January 1996) is a South African field hockey player who plays as a forward for the South African national team.

His brother, Siphesihle, was the assistant coach of the South African national hockey team at the Tokyo 2020 Olympics.

== Career ==
=== Under–18 ===
Ntuli made hem debut for the South Africa U–18 in 2014 at the Youth Olympic Games in Nanjing.

=== Under–21 ===
Ntuli made hem debut for the South Africa U–21 in 2016 at the Junior Africa Cup and Junior World Cup.

=== National team ===
Ntuli was a part of the South African squad which won the 2017 Africa Cup of Nations, which meant they qualified for the 2018 World Cup. He represented South Africa at the 2018 Commonwealth Games. In October 2018 he was selected in the South Africa squad for the 2018 World Cup.

== Honours ==
=== Club ===
- 2019 PHL Men - Player of the Tournament

=== National ===
- 2014 Africa Youth Olympic Games Qualifying Tournament (U18M) - Leading Goalscorer
- 2016 Men's Hockey Junior Africa Cup - Leading Goalscorer
- 2022 Men's Hockey Africa Cup of Nations - Player of the tournament
