= Jonathan Robinson (field hockey) =

South African field hockey player

Jonty Robinson
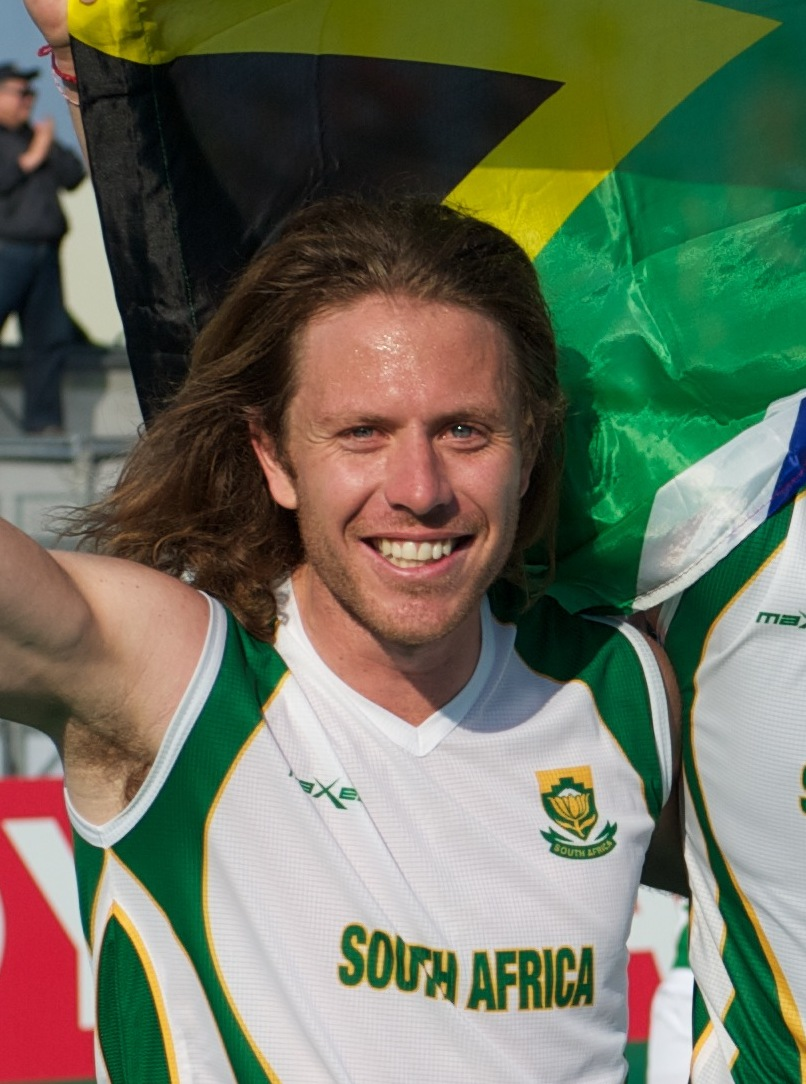

Personal information
- Born: Jonathan Robinson; 9 September 1986 (age 39) Johannesburg, South Africa

Sport
- Sport: Field hockey
National team
Years	Team	Caps	Goals
2009-2017	South Africa	115	(14)
2019	South Africa (indoor)	3	(0)
Coaching career
- Years: Team
- 2013-2018: Southgate Hockey Club (Women's)
- 2018-: Glenwood Boys High School
Medal record
Men's field hockey
Representing South Africa
African Cup of Nations
Gold medal – first place	2018 Nairobi
Gold medal – first place	2017 Ismailia

Jonty Robinson is a South African field hockey player At the 2012 Summer Olympics, he competed for the national team in the tournament.

Made his Debut for South Africa in 2009 against Germany in Bloemfontein. He went to school at Fish Hoek Primary School and then Wynberg Boys' High School. He then went onto study at the University of Pretoria.

He has played for South African Men's hockey team 115 times and the South Africa Indoor Hockey team 3 times. Participated in numerous international top-level tournaments including the London 2012 Olympic Games, New Delhi World Cup in 2010, Den Haag World Cup in 2014 and Commonwealth Games in Glasgow in 2014. Part of the winning SA team at the African Championship FIH International tournaments for the years 2009, 2011, 2013 and 2015.

An accomplished international club hockey career playing for Braxgata HC and RTHC Gantoise in Belgium, as well as a player and coach for Southgate Hockey Club in England. He also played for Holcombe Hockey Club and competed at the Round of 32 in the EHL in 2016 in Cooks Town. Has played for Riverside Hockey Clubs men's 1st team for many years and was part of the winning Belgotex Elite Club Challenge team twice.

Jonty is currently the:

- Performance Trainer for the KZN Olympic Hockey Squad
- Training Director of Glenwood Boys High School
- Performance Director at Riverside Hockey Club
- Alongside his playing career, Jonty is an accomplished SAHA level 3 qualified coach.

His brother Keagan Robinson also is an international hockey player.
