= Randburg Hockey Stadium =

Field hockey stadium in Randburg, South Africa

- Interactive map of Randburg Hockey Stadium
- Location: Praegville, Randburg, South Africa
- Coordinates: 26°05′45.3″S 27°58′59.5″E
- Capacity: 3,000
- Surface: Astroturf

Tenant
- Southern Gauteng Hockey Association

The Randburg Hockey Stadium, known as the Randburg Astroturf, is a 3,000-capacity field hockey stadium in Randburg, Gauteng, South Africa. In 2019, the venue hosted both men's and women's Premier Hockey League finals. Those were the last PHL finals. Both field hockey finals took place in front of capacity crowds of 3,000. The Drakensberg Dragons won the men's final and the Madikwe Rangers won the women's final.

== See also ==
- 1999 All-Africa Games
- 2002 Women's Hockey Champions Challenge
- 2012 Men's Junior Africa Cup for Nations
- 2015 African Olympic Qualifier
- Premier Hockey League
- 2016–17 Men's FIH Hockey World League Semifinals
