= Samkelo Mvimbi =

South African field hockey player

Personal information
- Born: 23 January 1999 (age 27) Plettenberg Bay, South Africa

Sport
- Sport: Field hockey
- Position: Midfielder
- Club: WPCC
Senior career
Years	Team	Caps	Goals
?-2021	University of Pretoria	19	-
2017-2019	Golden Gate Gladiators	13	-
National team
Years	Team	Caps	Goals
2019-	South Africa	50	(7)
Medal record
Representing South Africa
Men's field hockey
Africa Cup of Nations
Gold medal – first place	2025 Ismailia
- Updated on 6 November 2023

Samkelo 'Sam' Mvimbi (born 23 January 1999) is a South African field hockey midfielder. He competed in the 2020 Summer Olympics.

== Personal life ==
Mvimbi attended Oakhill High School, and graduated from University of Pretoria in International Relations.

== Honours ==
=== Club ===
==== Western Province Hockey ====
- 2022 Senior IPT Men - A Section - Player of the Tournament
