= Taine Paton =

South African field hockey player

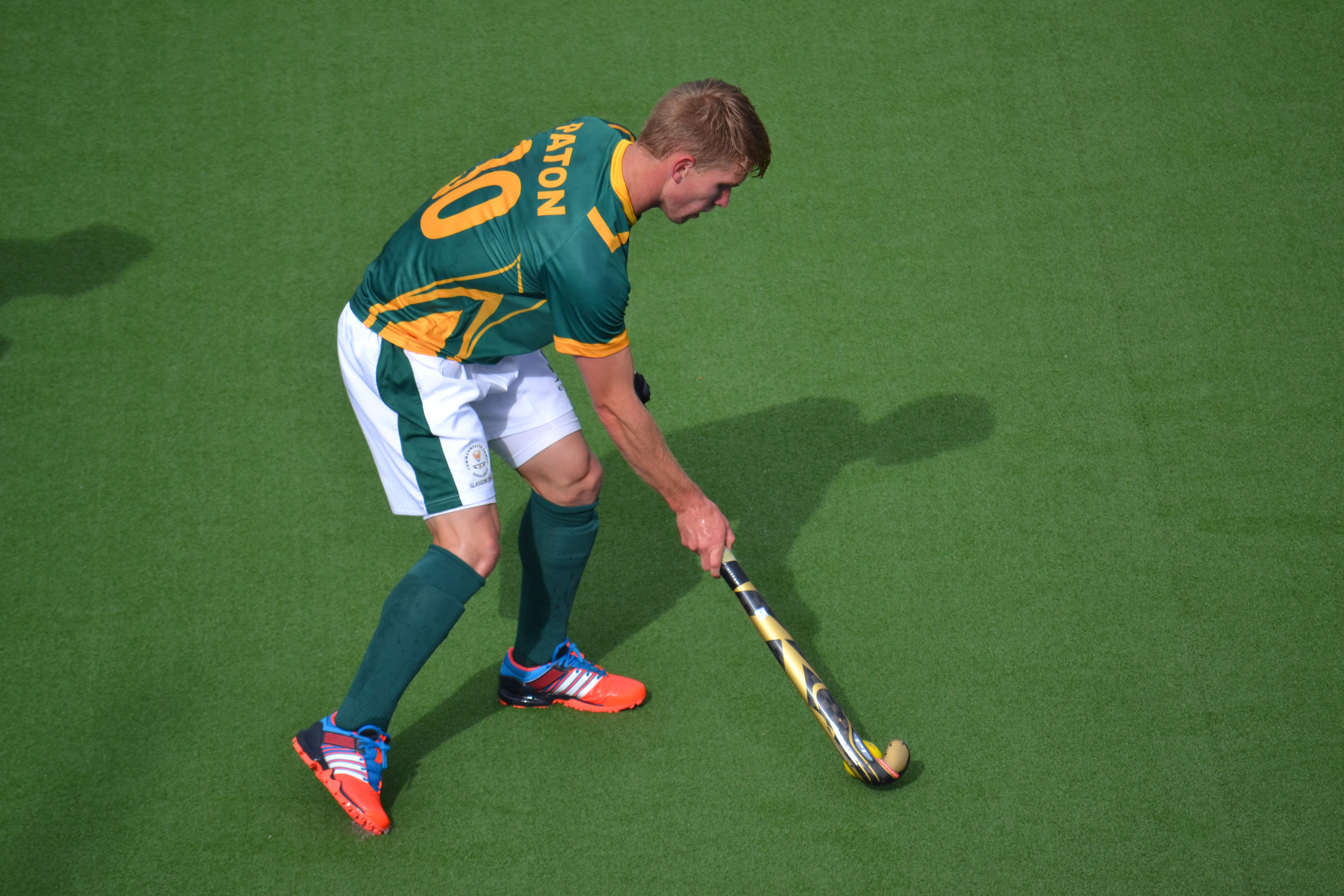

Personal information
- Born: 4 January 1989 (age 37) Durban, South Africa
- Height: 1.75 m (5 ft 9 in)
- Weight: 72 kg (159 lb)

Sport
- Sport: Field hockey
- Position: Midfielder
- Club: Gantoise
Senior career
Years	Team	Caps	Goals
–	Gantoise	-	-
–2018	Beerschot	-	-
2018–2023	Antwerp	-	-
2023–present	Gantoise	-	-
National team
Years	Team	Caps	Goals
2010–2022	South Africa	145	(34)
Medal record
Men's field hockey
Representing South Africa
African Cup of Nations
Gold medal – first place	2013 Nairobi
Gold medal – first place	2017 Ismailia
Gold medal – first place	2022 Accra
- Updated on 13 February 2024

Taine Paton (born 4 January 1989) is a South African field hockey player who plays as a midfielder for Belgian Hockey League club Gantoise. At the 2012 Summer Olympics, he competed for the national team in the men's tournament, with his brother Wade Paton. He also represented South Africa at the 2014 Commonwealth Games. He played a total of 145 matches for the South African national team until 2022.

The brother of Wade Paton.

== Club career ==
Paton first played for Gantoise in Belgium and then several years for Beerschot. In 2018 he joined Antwerp. He returned to Gantoise for the 2023–24 season.
