= Lance Louw =

South African field hockey player

Personal information
- Born: 12 May 1986 (age 40) Kimberley, South Africa

Sport
- Sport: Field hockey
National team
Years	Team	Caps	Goals
—2018	South Africa	31	(2)
Medal record
Men's field hockey
Representing South Africa
Africa Cup of Nations
Gold medal – first place	2009 Accra
Gold medal – first place	2017 Ismailia

Lance Louw (born 12 May 1986 in Kimberley, South Africa) is a South African field hockey player. At the 2012 Summer Olympics, he competed for the national team in the men's tournament.
