= Rassie Pieterse =

South African field hockey player

Personal information
- Full name: Erasmus Pieterse
- Born: 23 August 1983 (age 42) Virginia, Orange Free State, South Africa
- Height: 1.89 m (6 ft 2 in)
- Weight: 85 kg (187 lb)

Sport
- Sport: Field hockey
- Position: Goalkeeper
- Club: The Wanderers Club
National team
Years	Team	Caps	Goals
–	South Africa	161	-
Medal record
Men's field hockey
Representing South Africa
Africa Cup of Nations
Gold medal – first place	2013 Nairobi
Gold medal – first place	2017 Ismailia
- Updated on 24 July 2021

Erasmus "Rassie" Pieterse (born 23 August 1983) is a South African field hockey player, who plays as a goalkeeper. At the 2012 Summer Olympics, he competed for the national team in the men's tournament.

He retired after the Olympics, back to his day job as managing director of TK Sports.
