= South African Hockey Association =

Governing body for field hockey in South Africa

- Sport: Field hockey
- Jurisdiction: South Africa
- Abbreviation: SAHA
- Founded: August 1992
- Affiliation: FIH
- Regional affiliation: AHF
- Headquarters: Illovo, Johannesburg, South Africa
- President: Deon Morgan
- CEO: Phikolomzii Mbuqe
- Vice president: Lwandile Simelane
- Men's coach: Cheslyn Gie
- Women's coach: Giles Bonnet

Official website
- www.sahockey.co.za
- (South Africa)

The South African Hockey Association (SAHA) is the governing body of field hockey in South Africa.

It is affiliated with the International Hockey Federation (FIH) and AHF African Hockey Federation. The Head Office of SAHA is in Illovo, Johannesburg, South Africa.

== History ==
Established in August 1992 when five major hockey bodies formed one non-racial, unified body which controls and regulates hockey for men and women in South Africa. The unification brought together the South African Men's and Women's Hockey Associations, the Men's and Women's Hockey Congress and the South African Women's Hockey Board.

== SAHA clubs/provinces ==
Below is the list of provinces/clubs that participate in various SAHA tournaments:

- Eastern Province
  - Eastern Province Hockey Federation
  - Border Hockey Association
- Gauteng Province
  - Eastern Gauteng Hockey Association
  - Northerns Blues Hockey Association (just "Northerns")
  - South Gauteng Hockey Association
- Free State Province
  - Free State
  - Northern Free State
- KwaZulu-Natal
  - KwaZulu-Natal Coastal
  - KwaZulu-Natal Inland
- Western Cape Province
  - Boland
  - Eden Hockey Southern Cape
  - Western Province Hockey Union
- Limpopo
- Mpumalanga
- North West
- Northern Cape

=== Affiliates ===
- PSI Indoor Hockey
- South African Schools Hockey Association (SASHOC)
- SA Masters Hockey
- University Sports South Africa

== SAHA tournaments ==
=== Outdoor ===
Major

- Inter-Provincial Tournament (M & W)
- SA Country Districts Tournament (M & W)

Junior

- Inter-Provincial U-21 Tournament (M, & W)

Other

- Varsity Hockey (Varsity Sports)
- University Sport South Africa hockey Tournament (USSA)
- National Boys and Girls IPT (SASHOC: U-18, U-16,U-13)
- Regional Boys and Girls IPT (SASHOC: U-18, U-16, U-14, U-13, U-12)
- SA Masters Inter-Provincial Tournament (South African Masters Hockey)
- Allistar Fredericks Africa Challenge (SASHOC, U-16 – U-18 international series)

Defunct

- Premier Hockey League (2016–2020)

=== Indoor ===
- Nkosi Cup
- Indoor Inter-Provincial Tournament (M & W)

== See also ==
- South Africa men's national field hockey team
- South Africa women's national field hockey team
- South Africa men's national under-21 field hockey team
- South Africa women's national under-21 field hockey team
- South Africa men's national under-18 field hockey team
- South Africa women's national under-18 field hockey team
- African Hockey Federation
