= 2013 Men's Hockey Africa Cup of Nations =

Tournament details
- Host country: Kenya
- City: Nairobi
- Dates: 18–23 November
- Teams: 4 (from 1 confederation)

Final positions
- Champions: South Africa (6th title)
- Runner-up: Egypt
- Third place: Kenya

Tournament statistics
- Matches played: 8
- Goals scored: 42 (5.25 per match)
- Top scorer(s): (South Africa) Austin Smith (7 goals)

The 2013 Men's Hockey Africa Cup of Nations was the ninth edition of the Men's Hockey Africa Cup of Nations, the quadrennial international men's field hockey championship of Africa organised by the African Hockey Federation. It was held in Nairobi, Kenya from 18 to 23 November 2013.

The winner qualified for the 2014 Men's Hockey World Cup.

== Preliminary round ==
=== Standings ===
Pos	Team	Pld	W	D	L	GF	GA	GD	Pts	Qualification
1	South Africa	3	3	0	0	17	4	+13	9	Final
2	Egypt	3	2	0	1	8	11	−3	6	Final
3	Kenya (H)	3	1	0	2	5	8	−3	3	Third place match
4	Ghana	3	0	0	3	5	12	−7	0	Third place match

Source: FIH
(H) Hosts

=== Matches ===
18 November 2013
10:00

Egypt	3–2	Kenya
Ragab 32', 52'; Ramadan 69'	Report	Cheplait 49'; Mutria 61'

Umpires:
Coen van Bunge (NED)
Aziz Adimah (GHA)

18 November 2013
16:00

South Africa	6–2	Ghana
T. Paton 7'; Abbott 13'; Smith 28'; Norris-Jones 41'; Panther 61'; Hykes 62'	Report	Adjei 42', 51'

Umpires:
Tony Fernandes (KEN)
Ahmed Elsayed (EGY)

19 November 2013
14:00

Egypt	1–6	South Africa
Hassan 68'	Report	T. Paton 15'; Norris-Jones 42', 45'; Smith 47', 59'; De Voux 63'

Umpires:
Coen van Bunge (NED)
Tony Fernandes (KEN)

19 November 2013
16:00

Ghana	0–2	Kenya
	Report	Davis 46'; Wakhura 59'

Umpires:
Kirk Mendoza (RSA)
Ahmed Elsayed (EGY)

21 November 2013
14:00

Ghana	3–4	Egypt
Akaba 4'; Morrison 49'; Anum 52'	Report	El Hakim 35'; Sayed 53'; Mamdouh 57'; Mohsen 69'

Umpires:
Kirk Mendoza (RSA)
Tony Fernandes (KEN)

21 November 2013
16:00

South Africa	5–1	Kenya
Smith 13', 31', 44', 50'; Hykes 56'	Report	Davis 63'

Umpires:
Aziz Adimah (GHA)
Ahmed Elsayed (EGY)

== First to fourth place classification ==
=== Third and fourth place ===
22 November 2013
15:30

Kenya	4–1	Ghana
B. Odhiambo 32', 42'; Wanangwe 48'; Davis 64'	Report	E. Opoku 66'

Umpires:
Ahmed Elsayed (EGY)
Kirk Mendoza (RSA)

=== Final ===
23 November 2013
15:30

South Africa	2–0	Egypt
Hykes 8'; Panther 67'	Report

Umpires:
Coen van Bunge (NED)
Aziz Adimah (GHA)

== Statistics ==
=== Final standings ===
Pos	Team	Qualification
1st place, gold medalist(s)	South Africa	2014 Hockey World Cup
2nd place, silver medalist(s)	Egypt	
3rd place, bronze medalist(s)	Kenya (H)	
4	Ghana	

Source: FIH
(H) Host

=== Goalscorers ===
There were 42 goals scored in 8 matches, for an average of 5.25 goals per match.

7 goals

- (South Africa) Austin Smith

3 goals

- (Kenya) Wanangwe Davis
- (South Africa) Julian Hykes
- (South Africa) Lloyd Norris-Jones

2 goals

- (Egypt) Mohamed Ragab
- (Ghana) Richard Adjei
- (Kenya) Barnabas Odhiambo
- (South Africa) Clinton Panther
- (South Africa) Taine Paton

1 goal

- (Egypt) Ahmed el Hakim
- (Egypt) Mohamed Hassan
- (Egypt) Mahmoud Mamdouh
- (Egypt) Ahmed Mohsen
- (Egypt) Mohamed Ramadan
- (Egypt) Amr Sayed
- (Ghana) Elikem Akaba
- (Ghana) Abdul Anum
- (Ghana) Emmanuel Morrison
- (Ghana) Ernest Opoku
- (Kenya) Moses Cheplait
- (Kenya) George Mutria
- (Kenya) Constant Wakhura
- (Kenya) Frank Wanangwe
- (South Africa) Geoffrey Abbott
- (South Africa) Jean-Pierre de Voux

Source: FIH

== See also ==
- 2013 Women's Hockey Africa Cup of Nations
