= Julian Hykes =

South African field hockey player (born 1982)

Personal information
- Full name: Julian Allen Hykes
- Born: 6 October 1982 (age 43) East London, South Africa

Sport
- Sport: Field hockey
- Club: Beaulieu
National team
Years	Team	Caps	Goals
2009–2018	South Africa	129	-
Medal record
Men's field hockey
Representing South Africa
African Championships
Gold medal – first place	2009 Accra
Gold medal – first place	2013 Nairobi
Gold medal – first place	2017 Ismailia
African Olympic Qualifier
Gold medal – first place	2015 Randburg

Julian Allen Hykes (born 6 October 1982) is a former South African field hockey player. At the 2012 Summer Olympics, he competed for the national team in the men's tournament. After the 2018 World Cup he retired from the national team. He was also a cricketer, playing in two List A matches for Border in 2009.

== See also ==
- List of Border representative cricketers
