= Gowan Jones =

South African field hockey player

Personal information
- Born: 24 June 1989 (age 37)

Sport
- Sport: Field hockey
- Position: Goalkeepers
- Club: Riverside
National team
Years	Team	Caps	Goals
2013–present	South Africa	90	-
Medal record
Africa Cup of Nations
Gold medal – first place	2022 Accra

Gowan Jones (born 24 Jun 1989) is a South African field hockey player. He competed in the 2024 Summer Olympics.

He went to Northwood School and "Jones Astro" at Northwood School.
