= Ignatius Malgraff =

South African field hockey player

Personal information
- Born: 17 February 1993 (age 33) East London, South Africa

Sport
- Sport: Field hockey
- Club: Eastern Province
Senior career
Years	Team	Caps	Goals
2018	Nelson Mandela Metropolitan University	5	0
2014-present	Eastern Province	19	0
2016-2018	Addo Elephants	14	-
2019	Drakensberg Dragons	7	-
National team
Years	Team	Caps	Goals
2013	South Africa u21	11	(0)
2014-present	South Africa	67	(10)
Medal record
Men's field hockey
Representing South Africa
African Cup of Nations
Gold medal – first place	2017 Ismailia
Gold medal – first place	2022 Accra
- Updated on 24 January 2022

Ignatius Malgraff (born 17 February 1993 in East London, South Africa) is a South African field hockey player.

Malgraff represented South Africa in the 2014 Commonwealth Games in Glasgow

== Honours ==
=== Club ===
- 2016 PHL Men - Player of the Tournament
