= Clinton Panther =

South African field hockey player

Personal information
- Born: 13 February 1991 (age 35) Port Elizabeth
- Height: 177 cm (5 ft 9 1/2 in)
- Weight: 70 kg (154 lb)

Sport
- Sport: Field hockey
- Position: Midfield
National team
Years	Team	Caps	Goals
2012–present	South Africa	111	(12)
Medal record
Africa Cup of Nations
Gold medal – first place	2013 Nairobi

Clinton Panther (born 13 February 1991, in Port Elizabeth) is a South African field hockey player. He was educated at Michaelhouse, KwaZulu Natal. At the 2012 Summer Olympics he competed with the national team in the men's tournament. He also represented South Africa at the 2014 and 2018 Commonwealth Games.

== Personal life ==
His brother, Brandon, has also represented South Africa internationally in hockey. He studied finance at the University of Johannesburg and won Gauteng Sportsman of the Year in 2014.
