= Melrick Maddocks =

South African field hockey player

Personal information
- Born: 12 June 1994 (age 32)

Sport
- Sport: Field hockey
- Club: Gladbacher HTC
National team
Years	Team	Caps	Goals
2027-2019	South Africa	8	-
2019	South Africa (indoor)	3	(0)
Medal record
Africa Cup of Nations
Gold medal – first place	2017 Ismailia

Melrick Maddocks is a South African former field hockey player who competed in the 2017 Africa Cup of Nations.

He sister, Charné, also represents South Africa in field hockey.
