= 2022 Men's Hockey Africa Cup of Nations =

Tournament details
- Host country: Ghana
- City: Accra
- Dates: 17–23 January
- Teams: 7 (from 1 confederation)
- Venue: Theodosia Okoh Hockey Stadium

Final positions
- Champions: South Africa (8th title)
- Runner-up: Egypt
- Third place: Nigeria

Tournament statistics
- Matches played: 15
- Goals scored: 82 (5.47 per match)
- Top scorer: (South Africa) Matthew Guise-Brown (7 goals)
- Best player: (South Africa) Nqobile Ntuli

The 2022 Men's Hockey Africa Cup of Nations was the 11th edition of the Men's Hockey Africa Cup of Nations, the quadrennial international men's field hockey championship of Africa organised by the African Hockey Federation. In February 2021 it was announced that the tournament would be held alongside the women's tournament at the Theodosia Okoh Hockey Stadium in Accra, Ghana from 17 to 23 January 2022.

South Africa were the defending champions, winning the 2017 edition. They successfully defended their title after beating Egypt in the final. The winner qualified for the 2023 Men's FIH Hockey World Cup.

== Qualification ==
The top two highest-ranked teams in the FIH World Rankings qualified directly for the tournament while the other teams played in the regional qualifiers. The top two teams from each of the regional qualifiers qualified for the tournament. The three regions were North-East Africa, North-West Africa, and Central-South Africa.

Dates	Event	Location	Quotas	Qualifiers
—N/a	FIH World Rankings	—N/a	2	Egypt; South Africa
Cancelled	North-West Africa Qualifier	—N/a	2	Ghana; Nigeria
Cancelled	North-East Africa Qualifier	—N/a	2	Kenya; Uganda
Cancelled	Central-South Africa Qualifier	—N/a	1	Namibia; ~~Zimbabwe~~
Total			7	

== Preliminary round ==
The schedule was published on 14 December 2021.

All times are local (UTC±0).

=== Pool A ===
Pos	Team	Pld	W	D	L	GF	GA	GD	Pts	Qualification
1	South Africa	2	2	0	0	15	1	+14	6	Semi-finals
2	Kenya	2	1	0	1	5	3	+2	3	Semi-finals
3	Namibia	2	0	0	2	1	17	−16	0	

Source: FIH
Rules for classification: 1) points; 2) matches won; 3) goal difference; 4) goals for; 5) head-to-head result.

17 January 2022
20:00

South Africa	13–0	Namibia
Malgraff 5'; Drummond 10'; Pautz 23', 54'; Spooner 24', 54'; Guise-Brown 35', 47', 49'; Paton 45'; Sherwood 56', 60'; Jackson 58'	Report

Umpires:
Aziz Adimah (GHA)
Stanley Tamale (UGA)

18 January 2022
17:00

Namibia	1–4	Kenya
Tjikuniva 18'	Report	Wakhura 14'; Iningu 51'; Awino 53'; Onyango 57'

Umpires:
Deepak Joshi (IND)
Aziz Adimah (GHA)

19 January 2022
16:00

Kenya	1–2	South Africa
Wakhura 40'	Report	Ntuli 33', 37'

Umpires:
Simon Awasa (NGR)
Siyabonga Martins (NAM)

=== Pool B ===
Pos	Team	Pld	W	D	L	GF	GA	GD	Pts	Qualification
1	Egypt	3	3	0	0	8	3	+5	9	Semi-finals
2	Nigeria	3	1	1	1	13	8	+5	4	Semi-finals
3	Ghana (H)	3	0	2	1	2	3	−1	2	
4	Uganda	3	0	1	2	5	14	−9	1	

Updated to match(es) played on 20 January 2022. Source: FIH
Rules for classification: 1) points; 2) matches won; 3) goal difference; 4) goals for; 5) head-to-head result.
(H) Hosts

17 January 2022
16:00

Ghana	1–1	Uganda
Tettey 28'	Report	Ntumba 40'

Umpires:
Ahmed El-Sayed (EGY)
Elvis Bwalya (ZAM)

17 January 2022
18:00

Egypt	4–2	Nigeria
Sayed 32'; Ibrahim 35', 45'; Mos. Ragab 42'	Report	P. John 28'; Samaila 36'

Umpires:
Deepak Joshi (IND)
Siyabonga Martins (NAM)

18 January 2022
13:00

Nigeria	10–3	Uganda
P. John 9', 59'; Samaila 10'; Victor 11'; Sunday 20'; Ibrahim 22', 53'; M. John 35'; Solomon 40'; Godwin 42'	Report	Mugisha 3'; Opio 25'; Okodi 50'

Umpires:
Elvis Bwalya (ZAM)
Ahmed El-Sayed (EGY)

18 January 2022
19:00

Ghana	0–1	Egypt
	Report	El-Ganaini 55'

Umpires:
Simon Awasa (NGR)
Erik Etsebeth (RSA)

20 January 2022
13:00

Egypt	3–1	Uganda
Mos. Ragab 21'; Z. Adel 23'; Nasr 47'	Report	Ntumba 21'

Umpires:
Erik Etsebeth (RSA)
Simon Awasa (NGR)

20 January 2022
19:00

Nigeria	1–1	Ghana
P. John 43'	Report	Tettey 56'

Umpires:
Deepak Joshi (IND)
Peter Kabaso (KEN)

== Fifth to seventh place classification ==
=== Bracket ===
Sixth place
21 January
Namibia	2
Uganda	3

Fifth place
22 January
Ghana	6
Uganda	1

=== Sixth place game ===
21 January 2022
09:00

Namibia	2–3	Uganda
La Cock 29', 39'	Report	Opio 9', 13'; Batusa 34'

Umpires:
Erik Etsebeth (RSA)
Elvis Bwalya (ZAM)

=== Fifth place game ===
22 January 2022
11:00

Ghana	6–1	Uganda
Adjei 12', 37'; Tettey 23', 44'; Kwofie 34'; Akaba 58'	Report	Batusa 52'

Umpires:
Erik Etsebeth (RSA)
Simon Awasa (NGR)

== First to fourth place classification ==
=== Bracket ===
Semi-finals
22 January
South Africa	7
Nigeria	0
22 January
Egypt	5
Kenya	1

Final
23 January
South Africa (p.s.o.)	1 (3)
Egypt	1 (1)
Third place
23 January
Nigeria	4
Kenya	2

=== Semi-finals ===
22 January 2022
13:15

South Africa	7–0	Nigeria
Guise-Brown 17', 23', 57'; Ntuli 18'; Pautz 20'; Malgraff 27'; Bell 43'	Report

Umpires:
Ahmed El-Sayed (EGY)
Peter Kabaso (KEN)

22 January 2022
15:30

Egypt	5–1	Kenya
Nasr 11'; Ragab 12', 27'; M. Adel 37'; El-Naggar 43'	Report	Wakhura 51'

Umpires:
Aziz Adimah (GHA)
Siyabonga Martins (NAM)

=== Third place game ===
23 January 2022
14:15

Nigeria	4–2	Kenya
Godwin 7'; Sunday 18'; Ibrahim 31'; Samaila 44'	Report	Kipyego 18'; Iningu 52'

Umpires:
Ahmed El-Sayed (EGY)
Stanley Tamale (UGA)

=== Final ===
23 January 2022
18:15

South Africa	1–1	Egypt
Guise-Brown 12'	Report	Z. Adel 23'
Penalties
Spooner (penalty shoot-out scored); Mvimbi (penalty shoot-out scored); Ntuli (penalty shoot-out missed); Ngubane (penalty shoot-out missed); Sherwood (penalty shoot-out scored)	3–1	(penalty shoot-out missed) M. Adel; (penalty shoot-out scored) Edris; (penalty shoot-out missed) Sayed; (penalty shoot-out missed) Nasr

Umpires:
Deepak Joshi (IND)
Peter Kabaso (KEN)]

== Final ranking ==
Rank	Team
1st place, gold medalist(s)	South Africa
2nd place, silver medalist(s)	Egypt
3rd place, bronze medalist(s)	Nigeria
4	Kenya
5	Ghana
6	Uganda
7	Namibia

Qualified for the 2023 Men's FIH Hockey World Cup

== Goalscorers ==
There were 82 goals scored in 15 matches, for an average of 5.47 goals per match.

7 goals

- (South Africa) Matthew Guise-Brown

4 goals

- (Egypt) Mostafa Ragab
- (Ghana) Francis Tettey
- (Nigeria) Peter John

3 goals

- (Kenya) Constant Wakhura
- (Nigeria) Benjamin Ibrahim
- (Nigeria) James Samaila
- (South Africa) Nqobile Ntuli
- (South Africa) Richard Pautz
- (Uganda) Thomas Opio

2 goals

- (Egypt) Ziad Adel
- (Egypt) Amr Ibrahim
- (Egypt) Mohamed Nasr
- (Ghana) Richard Adjei
- (Kenya) Allan Iningu
- (Namibia) Dian La Cock
- (Nigeria) Sunday Godwin
- (Nigeria) Emmanuel Sunday
- (South Africa) Ignatius Malgraff
- (South Africa) Bradley Sherwood
- (South Africa) Nicholas Spooner
- (Uganda) Colline Batusa
- (Uganda) Timothy Ntumba

1 goal

- (Egypt) Mohamed Adel
- (Egypt) Ahmed El-Ganaini
- (Egypt) Ahmed El-Naggar
- (Egypt) Amr Sayed
- (Ghana) Emmanuel Akaba
- (Ghana) Benjamin Kwofie
- (Kenya) Emmanuel Awino
- (Kenya) Titus Kipyego
- (Kenya) Festus Onyango
- (Namibia) Isascar Tjikuniva
- (Nigeria) Michael John
- (Nigeria) Dennis Solomon
- (Nigeria) Kish Victor
- (South Africa) Daniel Bell
- (South Africa) Timothy Drummond
- (South Africa) Le-Neal Jackson
- (South Africa) Taine Paton
- (Uganda) Maxwell Mugisha
- (Uganda) Brian Okodi

Source: FIH

== See also ==
- 2022 Women's Hockey Africa Cup of Nations
