= South Africa men's national field hockey team =

South Africa
- Nickname(s): Ama Stokke Stokke
- Association: South African Hockey Association
- Confederation: AfHF (Africa)
- Head Coach: Devon van der Merwe
- Assistant coach(es): Kurt Cerfontein; Ashlin Freddy; Jacques le Roux; Devin Stanton
- Manager: Martin van Staden
- Captain: Dayaan Cassiem
- Most caps: Gregg Clark (250)
- Top scorer: Greg Nicol (209)
Home	Away

FIH ranking
- Current: 13 (6 November 2026)
- Highest: 10 (2005; 2021)
- Lowest: 16 (December 2018 – January 2019)

Olympic Games
- Appearances: 6 (first in 1996)
- Best result: 9th (2024)

World Cup
- Appearances: 8 (first in 1994)
- Best result: 10th (1994, 2010)

Africa Cup of Nations
- Appearances: 9 (first in 1993)
- Best result: (gold) 1st (1993, 1996, 2000, 2005, 2009, 2013, 2017, 2022, 2025)

African Games
- Appearances: 4 (first in 1995)
- Best result: (gold) 1st (1995, 1999)
Medal record
Event	1st	2nd	3rd
Africa Cup of Nations	9	0	0
African Games	2	1	0
Total	11	1	0
Africa Cup of Nations
Gold medal – first place	1993 Nairobi	
Gold medal – first place	1996 Pretoria	
Gold medal – first place	2000 Bulawayo	
Gold medal – first place	2005 Pretoria	
Gold medal – first place	2009 Accra	
Gold medal – first place	2013 Nairobi	
Gold medal – first place	2017 Ismailia	
Gold medal – first place	2022 Accra	
Gold medal – first place	2025 Ismailia	
African Games
Gold medal – first place	1995 Harare	Team
Gold medal – first place	1999 Johannesburg	Team
Silver medal – second place	2003 Abuja	Team
Champions Challenge
Silver medal – second place	2001 Kuala Lumpur	
Bronze medal – third place	2003 Johannesburg	
Bronze medal – third place	2011 Johannesburg	

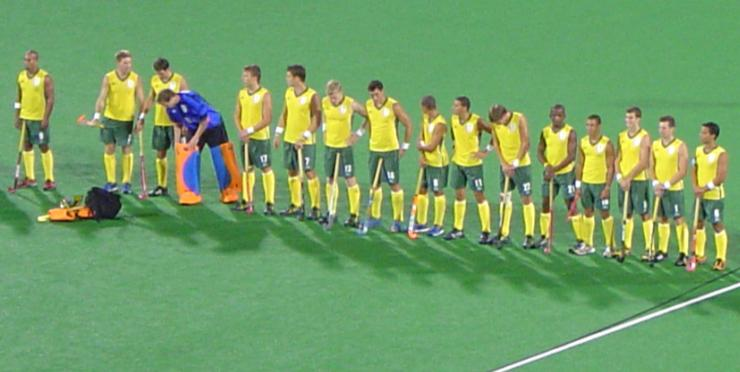
South Africa at the 2008 Olympics

The South Africa men's national field hockey team represents South Africa at international field hockey matches and tournaments.

== Tournament history ==
=== Summer Olympics ===
Summer Olympics record
Year	Round	Position	Pld	W	D	L	GF	GA	Squad
1980–1991	Banned (Note: South Africa was banned from international Hockey from 1964 onwards. South Africa was allowed to take part in international competitions from 1993 onwards.)								
(South Korea) 1992	did not qualify								
(United States) 1996	Group stage	10th	5	1	3	3	12	15	Squad
(Australia) 2000	did not qualify								
(Greece) 2004	Group stage	10th	7	2	1	4	15	17	Squad
(China) 2008	Group stage	12th	6	0	0	6	7	29	Squad
(United Kingdom) 2012	Group stage	11th	6	1	1	4	14	24	Squad
(Brazil) 2016	– (Note: South Africa won the continental qualifier however the team did not participate in the 2016 Olympics. South African Sports Confederation and Olympic Committee (SASCOC) and South African Hockey Association (SAHA) made an agreement on the Rio 2016 Olympics qualification criteria that the Continental Qualification route would not be considered. As a result, New Zealand, as the highest-ranked team from the 2014-15 Hockey World League Semifinals not already qualified, participated instead.)								
(Japan) 2020	Group stage	10th	5	1	1	3	16	24	Squad
(France) 2024	Group stage	9th	5	1	1	3	11	17	Squad
Total	6/11	0 titles	34	6	7	23	75	126	–

=== World Cup ===
FIH World Cup record
Year	Round	Position	Pld	W	D*	L	GF	GA	Squad
1971–1990	Banned								
(Australia) 1994	Group stage	10th							
(Netherlands) 1998	did not qualify								
(Malaysia) 2002	Group stage	13th	9	3	1	5	17	24	squad
(Germany) 2006	Group stage	12th	7	0	2	5	6	19	squad
(India) 2010	Group stage	10th	6	1	2	3	17	32	squad
(Netherlands) 2014	Group stage	11th	6	1	1	4	8	23	squad
(India) 2018	Group stage	16th	3	0	1	2	2	11	squad
(India) 2023	Group stage	11th	5	1	0	4	11	20	squad
(Belgium) / (Netherlands) 2026	Group stage	12th	6	1	3	2	14	17	squad

=== Africa Cup of Nations ===
- 1993 – (gold)
- 1996 – (gold)
- 2000 – (gold)
- 2005 – (gold)
- 2009 – (gold)
- 2013 – (gold)
- 2017 – (gold)
- 2022 – (gold)
- 2025 – (gold)

=== African Games ===
- 1995 – (gold)
- 1999 – (gold)
- 2003 – (silver)
- 2023 – Withdrew

=== African Olympic Qualifier ===
- 2007 – (gold)
- 2011 – (gold)
- 2015 – (gold)
- 2019 – (gold)
- 2023 – (gold)

=== Commonwealth Games ===
- 1998 – 5th place
- 2002 – 4th place
- 2006 – 8th place
- 2010 – 5th place
- 2014 – 5th place
- 2018 – 10th place
- 2022 – 4th place

=== Hockey World League ===
- 2012–13 – 15th place
- 2014–15 – 22nd place
- 2016–17 – 18th place

=== FIH Pro League ===
- 2021–22 – 9th place
- 2023–24 – Withdrew

=== FIH Hockey Nations Cup ===
- 2022 – (gold)
- 2023–24 – (bronze)
- 2024–25 – 8th
- 2025–26 – (silver)
- 2026–27 – Qualified

=== Sultan Azlan Shah Cup ===
- 2005 – 7th place
- 2014 – 6th place
- 2022 – 6th place

=== Champions Challenge I ===
- 2001 – (silver)
- 2003 – (bronze)
- 2005 – 5th place
- 2009 – 5th place
- 2011 – (bronze)
- 2012 – 7th place

== Results and fixtures ==
The following is a list of match results in the last 12 months, as well as any future matches that have been scheduled.

Win Draw Loss Fixture

=== 2026 ===
==== Test series ====
21 January 2026 Test 1	South Africa	0–5	Netherlands	Cape Town, South Africa
18:00 SAST		Report	van der Heijden ?'; Bijen ?', ?'; Brinkman ?' van Dam ?'	Stadium: Hartleyvale Stadium

23 January 2026 Test 2	South Africa	0–4	Netherlands	Cape Town, South Africa
15:00 SAST		Report	Bukkens ?', ?'; Reyenga ?'; Brinkman ?'	Stadium: Hartleyvale Stadium

==== 2026 FIH Nations Cup ====
11 June 2026 Pool B	France	4–2	South Africa	Cape Town, South Africa
19:00	Sellier 11'; Charlet 36', 53', 60'	Report	Melville 13'; Mentoor 20'	Stadium: Hartleyvale Stadium

13 June 2026 Pool B	South Africa	4–0	United States	Cape Town, South Africa
17:00	Davis 13'; Mthalane 36', 53'; Melville 59'	Report		Stadium: Hartleyvale Stadium

16 June 2026 Pool B	South Africa	3–3	Ireland	Cape Town, South Africa
19:00	Melville 24'; Mentoor 35'; Davis 57'	Report	Walsh 4'; Nelson 48', 60'	Stadium: Hartleyvale Stadium

19 June 2026 Semi finals	New Zealand	2–2 (0–2 p)	South Africa	Cape Town, South Africa
16:45	Russell 12'; Ward 55'	Report	Davis 27'; Melville 32'	Stadium: Hartleyvale Stadium
	Penalties
	Lane (penalty shoot-out missed); Thomas (penalty shoot-out missed); Woods (penalty shoot-out missed); Baker (penalty shoot-out missed)		(penalty shoot-out missed) D. Cassiem; (penalty shoot-out scored) Neethling; (penalty shoot-out scored) Raath

20 June 2026 Final	South Africa	1–2	France	Cape Town, South Africa
19:00	Mvimbi 48'	Report	Charlet 4'; Tynevez 8'	Stadium: Hartleyvale Stadium

==== Malaysia Test series ====
6 July 2026 Test 1	South Africa	3–1	Malaysia	Durban North, South Africa
19:00	Mentoor 18'; Wynford 20'; Cassiem 44'	Report	Rozemi 58'	Stadium: Riverside Hockey Club

7 July 2026 Test 2	South Africa	2–1	Malaysia	Hilton, South Africa
18:00	Seale 44'; Cassiem 45'	Report	Azrai 44'	Stadium: Hilton College

9 July 2026 Test 3	South Africa	2–2	Malaysia	Hilton, South Africa
18:00	Mvimbi 48'; Cassiem 55'	Report	Cholan 42'; Azrai 56'	Stadium: Hilton College

10 July 2026 Test 4	South Africa	3–3	Malaysia	Durban North, South Africa
19:00	de Lora 20'; Ngubane 34'; Cassiem 55'	Report	Kamaruddin 8'; Anuar 11'; Azrai 57'	Stadium: Riverside Hockey Club

12 July 2026 Test 5	South Africa	5–2	Malaysia	Durban North, South Africa
10:30	Melville 5', 26', 32'; Mthalane 37'; Mentoor 41'	Report	Cholan 3'; Rozemi 43'	Stadium: Riverside Hockey Club

==== 2026 FIH World Cup ====
16 August 2026 Pool C	Spain	3–1	South Africa	Wavre, Belgium
14:30	Reyne 12'; Basterra 13', 28'	Report	M. Cassiem 45'	Stadium: Belfius Hockey Arena

18 August 2026 Pool C	Ireland	4–1	South Africa	Wavre, Belgium
17:00	Walker 43'; Cole 49', 56'; Hyland 60'	Report	Melville 38'	Stadium: Belfius Hockey Arena

20 August 2026 Pool C	Australia	2–2	South Africa	Wavre, Belgium
11:30	Rintala 38'; Willott 43'	Report	M. Cassiem 4', 44'	Stadium: Belfius Hockey Arena

21 August 2026 Pool H	France	1–3	South Africa	Wavre, Belgium
11:00	Charlet 30'	Report	M. Cassiem 17', 19'; D. Cassiem 60'	Stadium: Belfius Hockey Arena

23 August 2026 Pool H	Malaysia	3–3	South Africa	Wavre, Belgium
11:30	Azrai 14', 22'; Saari 60'	Report	Wynford 17'; Spooner 28'; M. Cassiem 43'	Stadium: Belfius Hockey Arena

28 August 2026 11th place match	Pakistan	4–4 (4–3 p)	South Africa	Amstelveen, Netherlands
12:30	Afraz 21'; Ammad 22'; Rana 32'; Hammadudin 60'	Report	de Lora 8'; D. Cassiem 18'; M. Cassiem 40', 55'	Stadium: Wagener Stadium
	Penalties
	Hayat (penalty shoot-out scored); Mustafa (penalty shoot-out scored); Shahid (penalty shoot-out scored); Rana (penalty shoot-out missed); Butt (penalty shoot-out scored)		(penalty shoot-out scored) D. Cassiem; (penalty shoot-out scored) Davis; (penalty shoot-out missed) Neethling; (penalty shoot-out missed) Seale; (penalty shoot-out scored) M. Cassiem

== Current squad ==
Roster for the 2026 Hockey World Cup.

Head coach: Devon van der Merwe

No.	Pos.	Player	Date of birth (age)	Caps	Club
2	MF	Mustapha Cassiem	19 March 2002 (aged 24)	70	(Netherlands) AH&BC
3	DF	Andrew Hobson	20 March 1998 (aged 28)	53	(South Africa) Central
4		Calvin Davis	22 November 2003 (aged 22)	29	(South Africa) UP Tuks
5		Senzwesihle Ngubane	5 August 2001 (aged 25)	43	(South Africa) UP Tuks
6		Jamie Seale	29 August 2004 (aged 21)	13	
7	FW	Dayaan Cassiem (Captain)	1 December 1998 (aged 27)	99	(Netherlands) AH&BC
9		Jared Cass	13 August 1999 (aged 27)	10	
10		Hans Neethling	13 July 2002 (aged 24)	19	(South Africa) Maties
11		Tevin Kok	20 October 1996 (aged 29)	84	
15		Carlon Mentoor	18 January 2004 (aged 22)	15	
17	GK	Brendan du Toit	4 May 1999 (aged 27)	4	
18		Viwe Mbata	18 February 2003 (aged 23)	9	
20		Luke Wynford	4 April 2000 (aged 26)	23	(South Africa) UCT Ikey Rangers
23		Nicholas Spooner	28 August 1991 (aged 34)	87	
26		Damian Knott	15 April 2003 (aged 23)	6	
28		Trevor de Lora	21 March 2000 (aged 26)	32	
29		Samkelo Mvimbi	23 January 1999 (aged 27)	83	(South Africa) WPCC
30	GK	Cullin de Jager	28 November 2000 (aged 25)	18	
32		Ayakha Mthalane	5 June 2003 (aged 23)	15	
47		Kenton Melville	8 August 2003 (aged 23)	8	

== Gallery ==
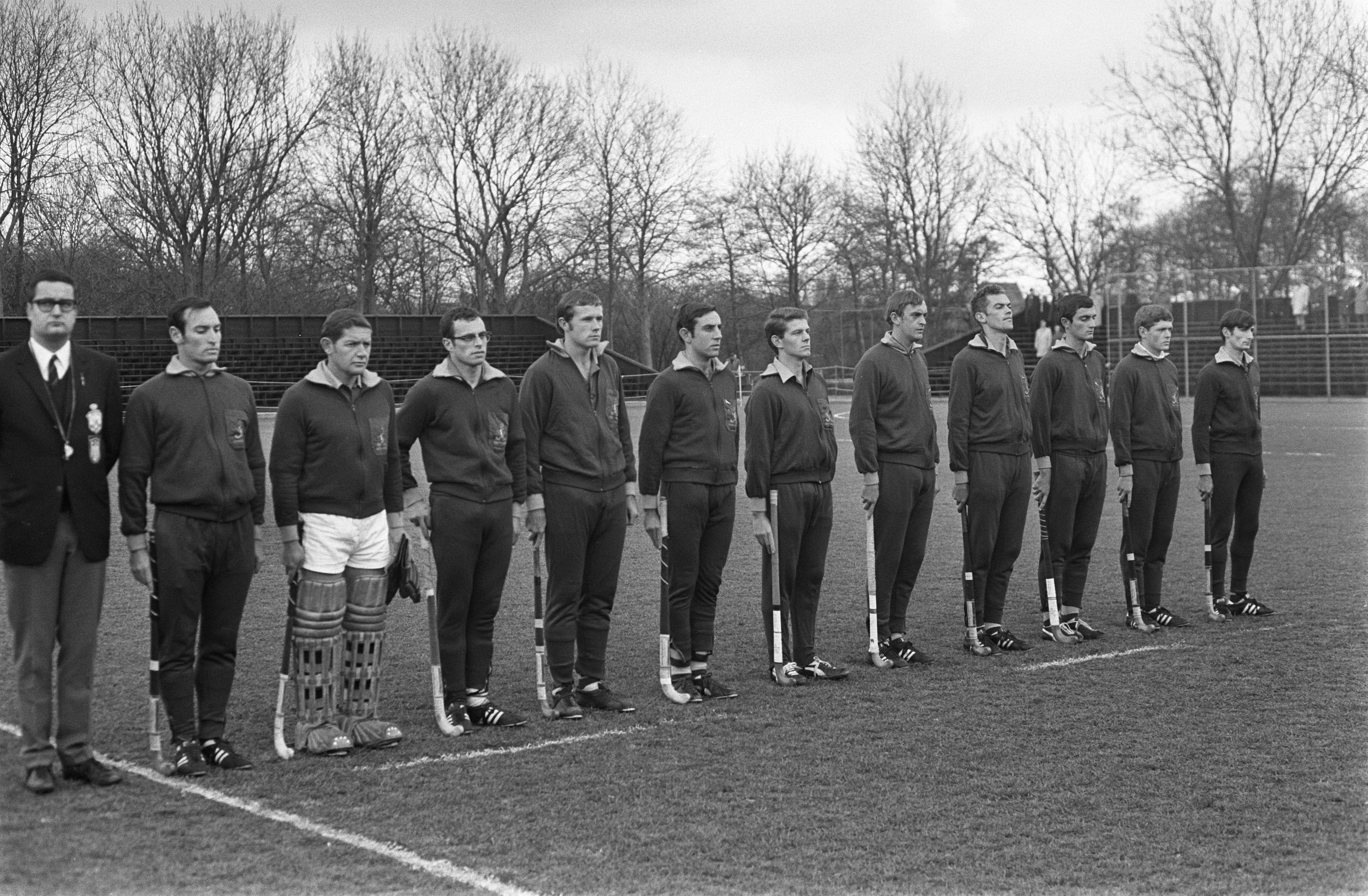
Netherlands against South Africa in Amstelveen, 1969

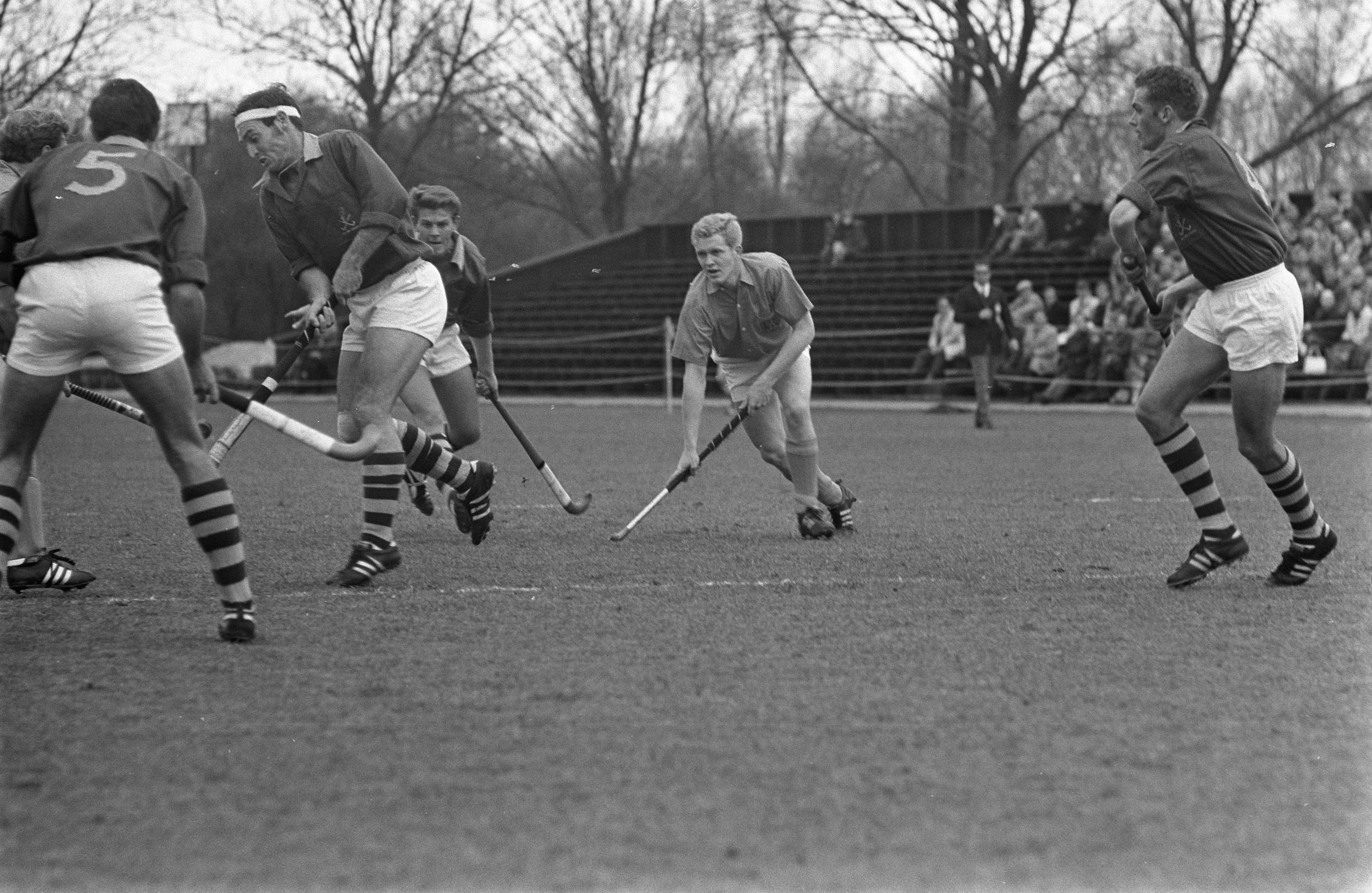
Netherlands against South Africa in Amstelveen, 1969

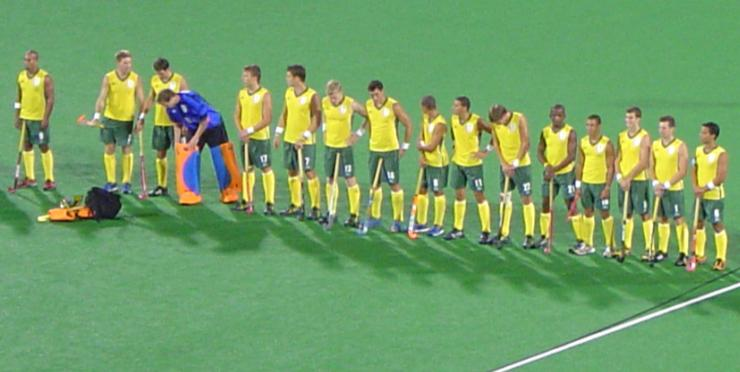
The South African field hockey team at the 2008 Summer Olympics just before the match against Great Britain

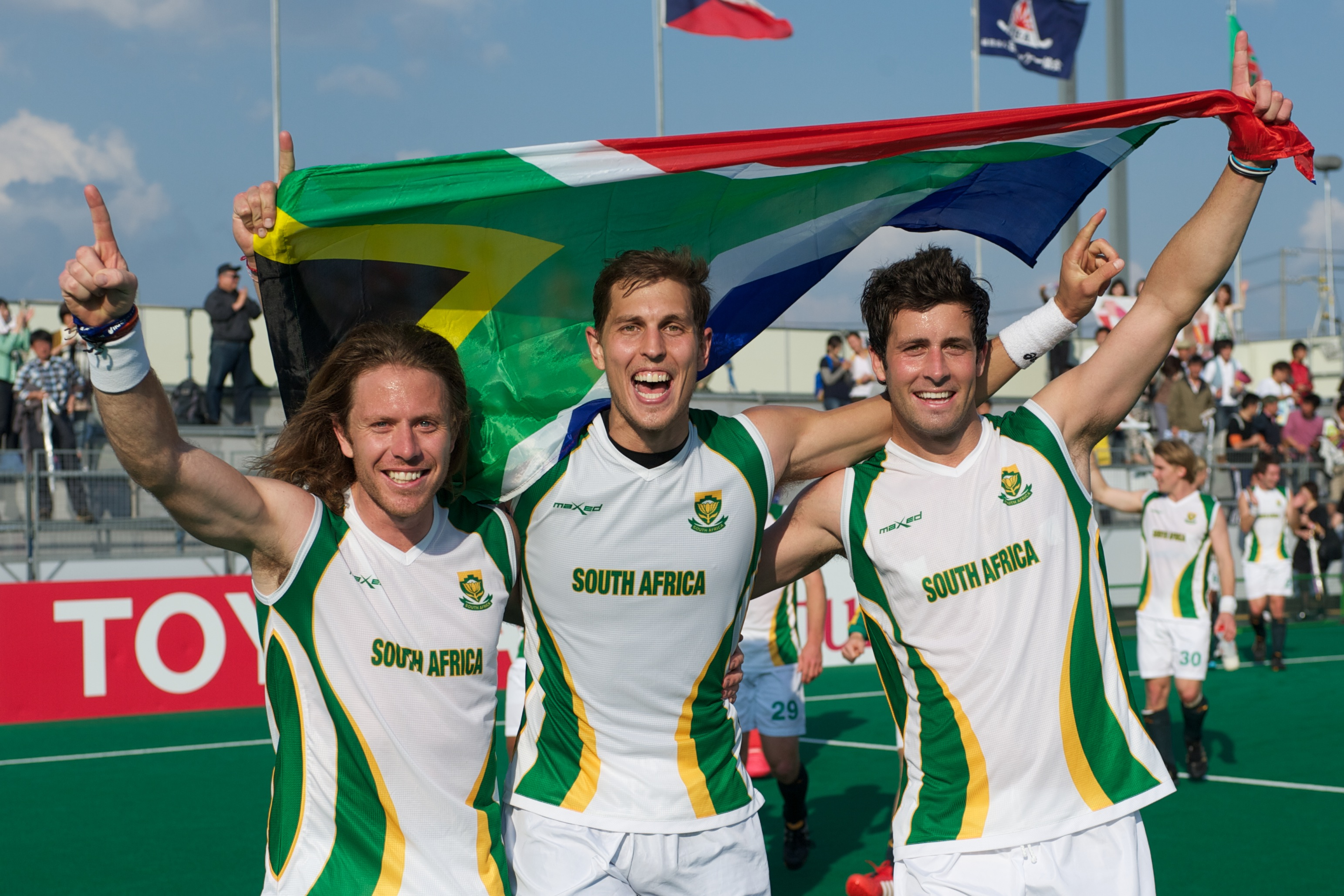
South African players celebrate their qualification for the London Olympics

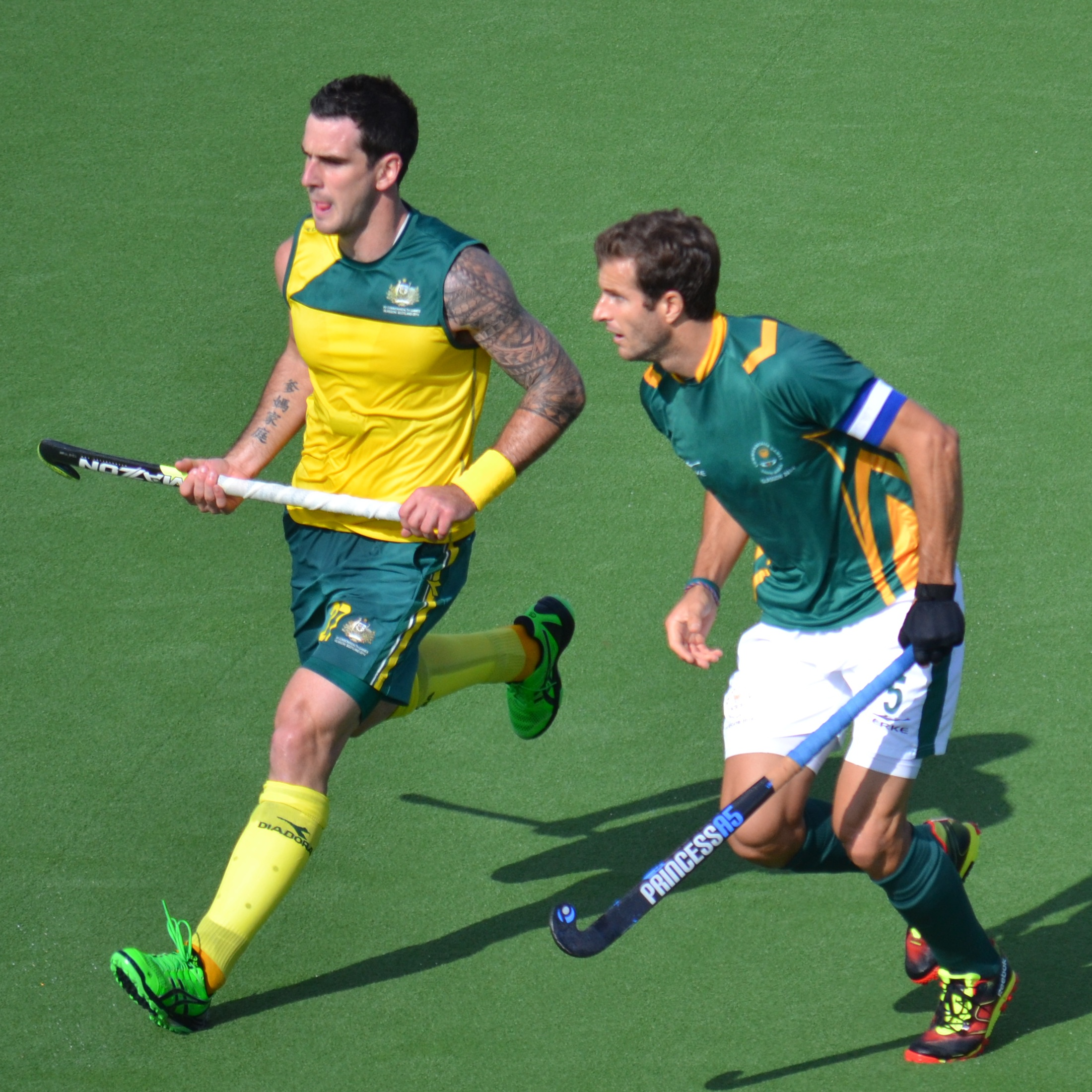
Glasgow 2014 — Kieran Govers (AUS) and Austin Smith (RSA)

== See also ==
- South Africa women's national field hockey team
- South Africa men's national under-21 field hockey team
- South Africa men's national indoor hockey team
