= Hockey at the 2022 Commonwealth Games – Men's team squads =

This article lists the squads of the men's field hockey competition at the 2022 Commonwealth Games, which were held in Birmingham, England from 29 July to 8 August 2022.

== Pool A ==
=== Australia ===
The squad was announced on 21 June 2022.

Head coach: Colin Batch

4. Jake Harvie
5. Tom Wickham
6. Matt Dawson
7. Nathan Ephraums
8. Johan Durst (GK)
9. Jacob Anderson
10. Joshua Beltz
11. Eddie Ockenden (C)
12. Jacob Whetton
13. Blake Govers
15. Joshua Simmonds
16. Tim Howard
17. Aran Zalewski (C)
22. Flynn Ogilvie
23. Daniel Beale
29. Tim Brand
30. Andrew Charter (GK)
32. Jeremy Hayward

=== New Zealand ===
Head coach: (South Africa) Greg Nicol

3. David Brydon
4. Dane Lett
5. Harry Miskimmin
9. Sam Hiha
11. Jake Smith
12. Sam Lane
13. Simon Yorston
15. George Enersen (GK)
16. Aidan Sarikaya
17. Nic Woods
18. Bradley Read
19. Joe Morrison
21. Leon Hayward (GK)
22. Kane Russell
23. Blair Tarrant (C)
24. Dylan Thomas
29. Sean Findlay
31. Hugo Inglis
32. Hayden Phillips

=== Pakistan ===
Head coach: (Netherlands) Siegfried Aikman

1. Akmal Hussain (gk)
3. Mubashar Ali
4. Rizwan Ali
7. Moin Shakeel
8. Abdul Rana
9. Abdul Shahid
11. Rooman Khan
12. Abdullah Ishtiaq (gk)
14. Muhammad Umar Bhutta (C)
15. Junaid Manzoor
16. Ammad Butt
17. Muhammad Hammadudin
18. Ghazanfar Ali
19. Muhammad Abdullah
22. Ahmad Nadeem
23. Ajaz Ahmad
28. Afraz Hakeem
32. Abdul Mannan

=== Scotland ===
The following 18 players were named on 5 July 2022 for the 2022 Commonwealth Games in Birmingham, England from 29 July to 8 August 2022.

Head coach: Derek Forsyth

No.	Pos.	Player	Date of birth (age)	Caps	Club
1	GK	Tommy Alexander	11 September 1989 (aged 32)	61	(Germany) Club an der Alster
3	DF	Callum Duke	5 July 1990 (aged 32)	77	(Scotland) Western Wildcats
5	MF	Michael Bremner	22 March 1992 (aged 30)	129	(Germany) UHC Hamburg
6	DF	Andy Bull	3 February 1992 (aged 30)	35	(England) Old Georgians
7	FW	Alan Forsyth (Captain)	5 April 1992 (aged 30)	152	(Netherlands) HGC
8	MF	Rob Field	14 April 1994 (aged 28)	18	(England) Holcombe
9	FW	Andy McConnell	5 January 2000 (aged 22)	20	(Scotland) Western Wildcats
10	FW	Rob Harwood	15 July 1997 (aged 25)	42	(Scotland) Western Wildcats
11	FW	Lee Morton	23 May 1995 (aged 27)	75	(England) Old Georgians
14	FW	Cammy Golden	2 June 1999 (aged 23)	39	(Germany) UHC Hamburg
17	FW	Struan Walker	6 July 2002 (aged 20)	15	(Germany) Club an der Alster
19	DF	Murray Collins	25 July 1996 (aged 26)	59	(England) Teddington
20	MF	Jamie Golden	24 December 2001 (aged 20)	10	(England) Surbiton
26	MF	Duncan Riddell	26 September 1993 (aged 28)	65	(England) Reading
27	DF	Robbie Shepherdson	24 August 1995 (aged 26)	42	(England) Teddington
28	FW	Ed Greaves	15 April 1995 (aged 27)	60	(England) Teddington
29	GK	Dave Forrester	14 December 1989 (aged 32)	52	(Scotland) Grange
32	DF	Callum Mackenzie	31 December 1998 (aged 23)	34	(England) Wimbledon

=== South Africa ===
The squad was announced on 4 July 2022.

Head coach: Garreth Ewing

2. Mustapha Cassiem
6. Connor Beauchamp
7. Timothy Drummond (C)
8. Nduduzo Lembethe
10. Keenan Horne
11. Tevin Kok
12. Le-Neal Jackson
13. Matthew Guise-Brown
15. Dayaan Cassiem
18. Taine Paton
19. Ryan Julius
21. Jethro Eustice
22. Daniel Bell
23. Nicholas Spooner
26. Siyavuya Nolutshungu (GK)
27. Nqobile Ntuli
29. Samkelo Mvimbi
32. Gowan Jones (GK)

== Pool B ==
=== Canada ===
The squad was announced on 4 July 2022.

Head coach: Peter Milkovich

1. Floris van Son
4. Roopkanwar Dhillon
5. Devohn Noronha-Teixeira
6. Alexander Bird
8. Oliver Scholfield
9. Gurpreet Singh
10. Keegan Pereira (C)
11. Balraj Panesar (C)
13. Brendan Guraliuk
14. Manveer Jhamat
19. Gavin Bains
20. Fin Boothroyd
21. Matthew Sarmento
22. John Smythe (C)
25. Harbir Sidhu
28. Tristan Burgoyne (GK)
29. Taylor Curran
30. Ethan McTavish (GK)

=== England ===
Team announced on 12 July. Ian Sloan (field hockey) later replaced Nick Park.

Head coach: Paul Revington

No.	Pos.	Player	Date of birth (age)	Caps	Club
14	DF	James Albery	2 October 1995 (aged 26)	55	(England) Old Georgians
21	FW	Liam Ansell	12 November 1993 (aged 28)	51	(England) Wimbledon
23	FW	Nick Bandurak	14 December 1992 (aged 29)	33	(England) Holcombe
31	FW	Will Calnan	17 April 1996 (aged 26)	59	(England) Hampstead & Westminster
22	MF	David Condon	6 July 1991 (aged 31)	146	(England) Wimbledon
18	DF	Brendan Creed	3 January 1993 (aged 29)	73	(England) Surbiton
19	MF	David Goodfield	15 June 1993 (aged 29)	86	(England) Surbiton
10	FW	Chris Griffiths	3 September 1990 (aged 31)	82	(England) Old Georgians
16	GK	James Mazarelo	4 February 2001 (aged 21)	24	(England) Surbiton
20	GK	Ollie Payne	6 April 1999 (aged 23)	37	(England) Holcombe
15	MF	Phil Roper	24 January 1992 (aged 30)	128	(England) Holcombe
17	MF	Stuart Rushmere	9 September 2000 (aged 21)	42	(England) Surbiton
11	MF	Ian Sloan	19 November 1993 (aged 28)	74	(England) Wimbledon
30	MF	Rhys Smith	13 March 1997 (aged 25)	25	(England) Wimbledon
29	MF	Tom Sorsby	28 October 1996 (aged 25)	56	(England) Surbiton
7	MF	Zachary Wallace (Captain)	29 September 1999 (aged 22)	62	(Netherlands) HDM
3	DF	Jack Waller	28 January 1997 (aged 25)	58	(England) Wimbledon
13	FW	Sam Ward	24 December 1990 (aged 31)	115	(England) Old Georgians

=== Ghana ===
Head coach: (Pakistan) Ghazanfar Ali

1. Derick Lee
2. Mohammed Osumanu
4. Charles Abbiw
7. Elikem Akaba
8. Emmanuel Ankomah
10. Benjamin Kwofie
12. Samuel Agbeli
13. Emmanuel Akaba
14. Samuel Afari
15. Ernest Opoku
16. Tyche Offei
19. Alfred Ntiamoah
20. Matthew Damalie
22. Michael Baiden
24. Luke Damalie
27. Christopher Dogbe
30. Eugene Acheampong
31. Francis Tettey

=== India ===
Head coach: (Australia) Graham Reid

4. Jarmanpreet Singh
5. Abhishek
6. Surender Kumar
7. Manpreet Singh (C)
8. Hardik Singh
9. Gurjant Singh
11. Mandeep Singh
12. Krishan Pathak (GK)
13. Harmanpreet Singh
14. Lalit Upadhyay
16. P. R. Sreejesh (GK)
18. Nilakanta Sharma
21. Shamsher Singh
22. Varun Kumar
27. Akashdeep Singh
30. Amit Rohidas
31. Jugraj Singh
32. Vivek Prasad

=== Wales ===
Team announced on 15 June.

Head coach: Daniel Newcombe

No.	Pos.	Player	Date of birth (age)	Caps	Club
15	MF	Rhys Bradshaw	19 September 2000 (aged 21)	29	(England) Exeter Univ
11	FW	James Carson	29 April 1994 (aged 28)	81	(England) Old Georgians
5	MF	Alf Dinnie	1 December 1994 (aged 27)	65	(Wales) Cardiff & Met
19	FW	Owain Dolan-Gray	17 December 1990 (aged 31)	124	(Wales) Cardiff & Met
6	DF	Jacob Draper	24 July 1998 (aged 24)	54	(Belgium) Beerschot
25	FW	Benjamin Francis	20 March 1996 (aged 26)	77	(England) Wimbledon
18	DF	Gareth Furlong	10 May 1992 (aged 30)	124	(England) Surbiton
31	MF	Gareth Griffiths	13 March 1999 (aged 23)	0	(England) Beeston
26	FW	Luke Hawker (co-Captain)	19 January 1989 (aged 33)	103	(Wales) Cardiff & Met
13	MF	Dale Hutchinson	13 October 1993 (aged 28)	90	(Wales) Cardiff & Met
24	DF	Hywel Jones	9 July 1997 (aged 25)	39	(England) Hampstead & W
12	DF	Stephen Kelly	12 May 1992 (aged 30)	63	(England) Hampstead & W
3	MF	Daniel Kyriakides	21 March 1995 (aged 27)	93	(England) Hampstead & W
8	MF	Lewis Prosser (co-Captain)	17 December 1990 (aged 31)	161	(England) East Grinstead
1	GK	Toby Reynolds-Cotterill	6 August 1997 (aged 24)	3	(England) Hampstead & W
2	GK	Dewi Roblin	10 February 1994 (aged 28)	3	(England) Hampstead & W
9	FW	Rupert Shipperley (co-Captain)	21 November 1992 (aged 29)	80	(England) Hampstead & W
4	DF	Ioan Wall	28 April 1999 (aged 23)	38	(Wales) Cardiff & Met
