= Hockey at the 2018 Commonwealth Games – Men's team squads =

This article lists the squads of the men's hockey competition at the 2018 Commonwealth Games held in Gold Coast, Australia, from 5 to 14 April 2018.

== Pool A ==
=== Australia ===
The squad was announced on 15 March 2018.

Head coach: Colin Batch

- Daniel Beale
- Andrew Charter (gk)
- Tom Craig
- Matt Dawson
- Jeremy Edwards
- Jake Harvie
- Jeremy Hayward
- Aaron Kleinschmidt
- Mark Knowles (capt)
- Tyler Lovell (gk)
- Trent Mitton
- Eddie Ockenden
- Flynn Ogilvie
- Lachlan Sharp
- Jake Whetton
- Tom Wickham
- Dylan Wotherspoon
- Aran Zalewski

=== Canada ===
Head coach: Paul Bundy

- Floris van Son
- Brandon Pereira
- Scott Tupper (capt)
- Richard Hildreth
- Keegan Pereira
- Balraj Panesar
- Adam Froese
- Gordon Johnston
- Brenden Bissett
- Mark Pearson
- Matthew Sarmento
- John Smythe
- Iain Smythe
- James Kirkpatrick
- Sukhi Panesar
- Taylor Curran
- David Carter (gk)
- Antoni Kindler (gk)

=== New Zealand ===
Head coach: Darren Smith

- Cory Bennett
- Dane Lett
- Harry Miskimmin
- Nick Ross
- Richard Joyce (gk)
- Marcus Child
- Jared Panchia
- Aidan Sarikaya
- Nic Woods
- Devon Manchester (gk)
- Kane Russell
- Arun Panchia (Capt)
- Shea McAleese
- Stephen Jenness
- Dominic Newman
- Hugo Inglis
- George Muir
- Hayden Phillips

=== Scotland ===
Team announced on 14 February.

Head coach: Derek Forsyth

- Thomas Alexander (gk)
- Rob Harwood
- Callum Duke
- David Forsyth
- Michael Bremner
- Nicky Parkes
- Alan Forsyth
- Chris Grassick (capt)
- Russell Anderson
- Gordon McIntyre
- Lee Morton
- Cameron Fraser
- Kenny Bain
- Willie Marshall
- Jamie Wong
- Gavin Byers
- Duncan Riddell
- Steven McIlravey (gk)

=== South Africa ===
Head coach: Mark Hopkins

- Tyson Dlungwana
- Austin Smith
- Tim Drummond (capt)
- Keenan Horne
- Owen Mvimbi
- Gareth Heyns
- Dayaan Cassiem
- Daniel Sibbald
- Ryan Julius
- Tevin Kok
- Jethro Eustice
- Daniel Bell
- Siyavuya Nolutshungu (gk)
- Reza Rosenberg
- Nqobile Ntuli
- Ryan Crowe
- Clinton Panther
- Gowan Jones (gk)

== Pool B ==
=== England ===
Head coach: Bobby Crutchley

- George Pinner (co-capt) (gk)
- Harry Gibson (gk)
- Ollie Willars
- Henry Weir
- Harry Martin
- Chris Griffiths
- Ian Sloan (co-capt)
- Mark Gleghorne
- Phil Roper (co-capt)
- Adam Dixon
- Barry Middleton
- Brendan Creed
- David Goodfield
- Liam Ansell
- David Condon
- James Gall
- Liam Sanford

=== India ===
Head coach: Sjoerd Marijne

- Harmanpreet Singh
- Dilpreet Singh
- Rupinder Pal Singh
- Khadangbam Kothajit Singh
- Manpreet Singh (capt)
- Gurjant Singh
- Mandeep Singh
- Suraj Karkera (gk)
- Lalit Upadhyay
- Sreejesh Parattu Raveendran (gk)
- Sumit Walmiki
- Varun Kumar
- Gurinder Singh
- S. V. Sunil
- Akashdeep Singh
- Chinglensana Kangujam
- Amit Rohidas
- Vivek Sagar Prasad

=== Malaysia ===
Head coach: Stephen van Huizen

- Norsyafiq Sumantri
- Ramadan Rosli
- Fitri Saari
- Joel van Huizen
- Faizal Saari
- Syed Cholan
- Sukri Mutalib (capt)
- Firhan Ashari
- Amirol Arshad
- Nabil Noor
- Razie Rahim
- Azri Hassan
- Azuan Hasan
- Hafizuddin Othman (gk)
- Tengku Ahmad Tajuddin
- Najmi Jazlan
- Shahril Saabah
- Hairi Rahman (gk)

=== Pakistan ===
Head coach: Roelant Oltmans

- Imran Butt (gk)
- Mubashar Ali
- Muhammad Irfan
- Toseeq Arshad
- Tasawar Abbas
- Arslan Qadir
- Shafqat Rasool
- Suhail Riaz
- Ali Shan
- Muhammad Rizwan (capt)
- Mazhar Abbas (gk)
- Muhammad Irfan Jr.
- Muhammad Dilber
- Tazeem Ul Hassan
- Ammad Butt
- Muhammad Atiq
- Faisal Qadir
- Abu Mahmood

=== Wales ===
Head coach: Zak Jones

- James Fortnam (gk)
- Daniel Kyriakides
- Ioan Wall
- Alf Dinnie
- Jacob Draper
- Lewis Prosser (co-capt)
- Rupert Shipperley
- James Carson
- Steve Kelly
- Dale Hutchinson
- Rhys Gowman
- Gareth Furlong
- Owain Dolan-Gray
- James Kyriakides
- Hywel Jones
- Ben Francis
- Luke Hawker (co-capt)
- David Kettle (gk)

== See also ==
- Hockey at the 2018 Commonwealth Games – Women's team squads
