= 2021 Men's EuroHockey Championship squads =

This article lists the confirmed squads for the 2021 Men's EuroHockey Championship tournament held in Amstelveen, Netherlands between 4 and 12 June 2021. The eight national teams were required to register a playing squad of 18 players and two reserves.

Age, caps and club for each player are as of 4 June 2021, the first day of the tournament.

== Pool A ==
=== Belgium ===
Head coach: (New Zealand) Shane McLeod

Belgium announced their final squad on 25 May 2021.

No.	Pos.	Player	Date of birth (age)	Caps	Club
2	GK	Loic Van Doren	14 September 1996 (aged 24)	28	(Netherlands) Den Bosch
4	DF	Arthur Van Doren	1 October 1994 (aged 26)	192	(Netherlands) Bloemendaal
7	MF	John-John Dohmen	24 January 1988 (aged 33)	403	(Belgium) Orée
8	FW	Florent Van Aubel	25 October 1991 (aged 29)	241	(Belgium) Dragons
9	FW	Sébastien Dockier	28 December 1989 (aged 31)	204	(Netherlands) Pinoké
10	FW	Cédric Charlier	27 November 1987 (aged 33)	324	(Belgium) Dragons
12	DF	Gauthier Boccard	26 August 1991 (aged 29)	228	(Belgium) Waterloo Ducks
13	FW	Nicolas De Kerpel	23 March 1993 (aged 28)	69	(Belgium) Herakles
16	DF	Alexander Hendrickx	6 August 1993 (aged 27)	134	(Netherlands) Pinoké
17	FW	Thomas Briels (Captain)	23 August 1987 (aged 33)	348	(Netherlands) Oranje-Rood
19	MF	Félix Denayer	31 January 1990 (aged 31)	329	(Belgium) Dragons
21	GK	Vincent Vanasch	21 December 1987 (aged 33)	240	(Germany) Rot-Weiss Köln
22	MF	Simon Gougnard	17 January 1991 (aged 30)	287	(Belgium) Leuven
23	DF	Arthur De Sloover	3 May 1997 (aged 24)	91	(Belgium) Beerschot
24	MF	Antoine Kina	13 February 1996 (aged 25)	75	(Belgium) Gantoise
25	DF	Loïck Luypaert	19 August 1991 (aged 29)	249	(Belgium) Braxgata
26	MF	Victor Wegnez	25 December 1995 (aged 25)	96	(Belgium) Racing
27	FW	Tom Boon	25 January 1990 (aged 31)	299	(Belgium) Léopold

=== England ===
Head coach: Danny Kerry

England announced their final squad on 28 May 2021.

No.	Pos.	Player	Date of birth (age)	Caps	Goals	Club
1	GK	George Pinner	18 January 1987 (aged 34)	195	0	(England) Old Georgians
5	DF	David Ames	25 June 1989 (aged 31)	159	4	(England) Holcombe
9	MF	Harry Martin	23 October 1992 (aged 28)	233	18	(England) Hampstead & Westminster
10	FW	Chris Griffiths	3 September 1990 (aged 30)	107	25	(England) Old Georgians
11	MF	Ian Sloan	19 November 1993 (aged 27)	126	5	(England) Wimbledon
13	FW	Sam Ward	24 December 1990 (aged 30)	130	72	(England) Old Georgians
15	FW	Phil Roper	24 January 1992 (aged 29)	150	37	(England) Wimbledon
16	DF	Adam Dixon (Captain)	11 September 1986 (aged 34)	279	21	(England) Beeston
18	DF	Brendan Creed	3 January 1993 (aged 28)	82	1	(England) Surbiton
19	MF	David Goodfield	15 June 1993 (aged 27)	55	10	(England) Surbiton
20	GK	Ollie Payne	6 April 1999 (aged 22)	6	0	(England) Holcombe
21	FW	Liam Ansell	12 November 1993 (aged 27)	49	15	(England) Wimbledon
22	FW	David Condon	6 July 1991 (aged 29)	179	27	(England) Wimbledon
25	DF	Jack Waller	28 January 1997 (aged 24)	50	1	(England) Wimbledon
26	MF	James Gall	20 May 1995 (aged 26)	85	4	(England) Surbiton
27	DF	Liam Sanford	14 March 1996 (aged 25)	64	0	(England) Old Georgians
29	MF	Tom Sorsby	28 October 1996 (aged 24)	34	0	(England) Surbiton
31	FW	Will Calnan	17 April 1996 (aged 25)	38	5	(England) Hampstead & Westminster
32	MF	Zach Wallace	29 September 1999 (aged 21)	50	6	(England) Surbiton

=== Russia ===
Head coach: Vladimir Konkin

Russia's final squad.

No.	Pos.	Player	Date of birth (age)	Caps	Club
1	GK	Ivan Ozherelev	9 December 1995 (aged 25)	8	
5		Mikhail Proskuriakov	20 September 1995 (aged 25)	48	(Russia) Dinamo Elektrostal
7		Sergey Lepeshkin	27 July 1997 (aged 23)	12	(Russia) Dinamo Elektrostal
8	FW	Georgii Arusiia	31 August 1999 (aged 21)	18	(Russia) Dinamo Elektrostal
9	DF	Semen Matkovskiy	8 September 1992 (aged 28)	57	(Russia) HK Dinamo Kazan
10	MF	Linar Fattakhov	8 July 1991 (aged 29)	0	(Russia) HK Dinamo Kazan
11		Alexander Skiperskiy	20 November 1990 (aged 30)	26	
12		Evgeny Artemov	29 September 1996 (aged 24)	13	(Russia) Dinamo Elektrostal
14		Marat Khairullin (Captain)	20 October 1993 (aged 27)	34	(Russia) Dinamo Elektrostal
15		Pavel Golubev	18 April 1990 (aged 31)	96	
17		Andrey Kuraev	26 March 1995 (aged 26)	32	(Russia) Dinamo Elektrostal
19		Iaroslav Loginov	6 November 1987 (aged 33)	138	(Russia) Dinamo Elektrostal
20		Artem Nadyrshin	19 January 1997 (aged 24)	2	
22	GK	Marat Gafarov	11 August 1987 (aged 33)	63	
24		Artem Borisov	2 October 1989 (aged 31)	41	
25		Alexey Sobolevskiy	8 October 2001 (aged 19)	13	
27		Denis Starienko	28 September 2001 (aged 19)	12	
28		Ilfat Zamalutdinov	28 February 1992 (aged 29)	51	

=== Spain ===
Head coach: (France) Fred Soyez

Spain announced their final squad on 25 May 2021. On 28 May, Roc Oliva was replaced by Marc Miralles because of Oliva's imminent fatherhood.

No.	Pos.	Player	Date of birth (age)	Caps	Club
1	GK	Quico Cortés	29 March 1983 (aged 38)	305	(Spain) Club Egara
4	DF	Ricardo Sánchez	4 December 1992 (aged 28)	86	(Spain) Club de Campo
7	MF	Miquel Delas (Captain)	13 April 1984 (aged 37)	259	(Spain) Barcelona
8	FW	Quique González	29 April 1996 (aged 25)	114	(Spain) Club de Campo
9	MF	Álvaro Iglesias	1 March 1993 (aged 28)	142	(Spain) Club de Campo
10	MF	Marc Sallés	6 May 1987 (aged 34)	245	(Spain) Atlètic Terrassa
12	MF	Joan Tarrés	8 May 1996 (aged 25)	55	(Spain) Atlètic Terrassa
13	MF	David Alegre	6 September 1984 (aged 36)	276	(Spain) Real Club de Polo
16	DF	Llorenç Piera	4 November 1996 (aged 24)	36	(Spain) Real Club de Polo
17	FW	Xavi Lleonart	22 June 1990 (aged 30)	203	(Spain) Real Club de Polo
19	FW	José Basterra	3 January 1997 (aged 24)	3	(Spain) Club de Campo
20	DF	Alejandro Alonso	14 February 1999 (aged 22)	4	(Spain) Tenis
21	MF	Viçens Ruiz	30 October 1991 (aged 29)	164	(Spain) Real Club de Polo
23	DF	Josep Romeu	22 May 1990 (aged 31)	138	(Spain) Club Egara
24	GK	Mario Garín	26 April 1992 (aged 29)	60	(Spain) Club de Campo
25	FW	Pau Quemada	4 September 1983 (aged 37)	278	(Spain) Club Egara
27	FW	Marc Boltó	21 November 1995 (aged 25)	75	(Spain) Atlètic Terrassa
28	MF	Marc Miralles	14 November 1997 (aged 23)	37	(Spain) Real Club de Polo
30	DF	Marc Recasens	13 September 1999 (aged 21)	13	(Spain) Club Egara

== Pool B ==
=== France ===
Head coach: (Netherlands) Jeroen Delmee

France announced their final squad on 30 May 2021.

No.	Pos.	Player	Date of birth (age)	Caps	Club
1	GK	Arthur Thieffry	15 September 1989 (aged 31)	69	(Belgium) Orée
3	DF	Mattéo Desgouillons	21 January 2000 (aged 21)	1	(France) Montrouge
4	FW	Pieter van Straaten	23 October 1992 (aged 28)	88	(Belgium) Antwerp
8	FW	Blaise Rogeau	26 November 1994 (aged 26)	66	(Belgium) Gantoise
10	DF	Viktor Lockwood	29 March 1992 (aged 29)	117	(France) Lille
11	MF	Charles Masson	13 April 1992 (aged 29)	94	(Belgium) Gantoise
12	DF	Amaury Bellenger	14 August 1998 (aged 22)	31	(Belgium) Orée
13	DF	Nicolas Dumont	13 December 1991 (aged 29)	65	(Belgium) Waterloo Ducks
14	FW	Gaspard Baumgarten	3 August 1992 (aged 28)	129	(Belgium) Léopold
16	MF	François Goyet	4 November 1994 (aged 26)	101	(Belgium) Gantoise
18	DF	Jean-Bapiste Forgues	18 May 1992 (aged 29)	143	(Belgium) Léopold
19	FW	Corentin Sellier	29 May 2001 (aged 20)	1	(France) Montrouge
20	MF	Eliot Curty	18 September 1998 (aged 22)	17	(Belgium) Orée
22	DF	Victor Charlet (Captain)	19 November 1993 (aged 27)	117	(Belgium) Waterloo Ducks
23	FW	Benjamin Marqué	11 August 2000 (aged 20)	0	(Belgium) Daring
26	FW	Antonin Igau	9 January 2000 (aged 21)	1	(France) Montrouge
28	FW	Timothée Clément	8 April 2000 (aged 21)	15	(Belgium) Orée
29	GK	Corentin Saunier	1 February 1994 (aged 27)	37	(France) Stade Français

=== Germany ===
Germany announced their final squad on 28 May 2021.

Head coach: Kais al Saadi

No.	Pos.	Player	Date of birth (age)	Caps	Club
4	DF	Lukas Windfeder	11 May 1995 (aged 26)	117	(Germany) Uhlenhorst Mülheim
5	DF	Linus Müller	2 December 1999 (aged 21)	12	(Germany) Mannheimer HC
6	DF	Martin Häner	27 August 1988 (aged 32)	257	(Germany) Berliner HC
8	FW	Paul-Philipp Kaufmann	21 June 1996 (aged 24)	11	(Germany) TSV Mannheim
9	FW	Niklas Wellen	14 December 1994 (aged 26)	144	(Netherlands) Pinoké
11	MF	Constantin Staib	31 August 1995 (aged 25)	74	(Germany) Hamburger Polo Club
12	MF	Timm Herzbruch	7 June 1997 (aged 23)	79	(Germany) Uhlenhorst Mülheim
13	DF	Tobias Hauke (Captain)	11 September 1987 (aged 33)	319	(Germany) Harvestehude
17	FW	Christopher Rühr	19 December 1993 (aged 27)	147	(Germany) Rot-Weiss Köln
19	MF	Justus Weigand	20 April 2000 (aged 21)	7	(Germany) Mannheimer HC
20	MF	Martin Zwicker	27 February 1987 (aged 34)	242	(Germany) Berliner HC
23	FW	Florian Fuchs	10 November 1991 (aged 29)	224	(Netherlands) Bloemendaal
24	MF	Benedikt Fürk	20 October 1988 (aged 32)	173	(Germany) Uhlenhorst Mülheim
26	DF	Niklas Bosserhoff	15 April 1998 (aged 23)	26	(Germany) Uhlenhorst Mülheim
27	MF	Timur Oruz	27 October 1994 (aged 26)	82	(Germany) Rot-Weiss Köln
29	DF	Johannes Große	7 January 1997 (aged 24)	61	(Germany) Rot-Weiss Köln
30	GK	Victor Aly	2 June 1994 (aged 27)	27	(Germany) Großflottbek
32	GK	Alexander Stadler	16 October 1999 (aged 21)	5	(Germany) TSV Mannheim

=== Netherlands ===
Head coach: (Argentina) Maximiliano Caldas

The Netherlands announced their final squad on 28 May 2021.

No.	Pos.	Player	Date of birth (age)	Caps	Club
2	FW	Jeroen Hertzberger	24 February 1986 (aged 35)	254	(Netherlands) Rotterdam
4	DF	Lars Balk	26 February 1996 (aged 25)	66	(Netherlands) Kampong
5	FW	Thijs van Dam	5 January 1997 (aged 24)	49	(Netherlands) Rotterdam
6	MF	Jonas de Geus	29 April 1998 (aged 23)	82	(Netherlands) Kampong
7	MF	Jorrit Croon	9 August 1998 (aged 22)	80	(Netherlands) Bloemendaal
8	MF	Billy Bakker (Captain)	23 November 1988 (aged 32)	223	(Netherlands) Amsterdam
9	MF	Seve van Ass	10 April 1992 (aged 29)	177	(Netherlands) HGC
11	DF	Glenn Schuurman	16 April 1991 (aged 30)	146	(Netherlands) Bloemendaal
12	DF	Sander de Wijn	2 May 1990 (aged 31)	149	(Netherlands) Kampong
14	MF	Robbert Kemperman	24 June 1990 (aged 30)	215	(Netherlands) Kampong
16	FW	Mirco Pruyser	11 August 1989 (aged 31)	129	(Netherlands) Amsterdam
21	GK	Maurits Visser	8 June 1995 (aged 25)	4	(Netherlands) Bloemendaal
23	DF	Joep de Mol	10 December 1995 (aged 25)	82	(Netherlands) Oranje-Rood
25	FW	Thierry Brinkman	19 March 1995 (aged 26)	106	(Netherlands) Bloemendaal
26	GK	Pirmin Blaak	8 March 1988 (aged 33)	101	(Netherlands) Oranje-Rood
27	DF	Jip Janssen	14 October 1997 (aged 23)	38	(Netherlands) Kampong
30	DF	Mink van der Weerden	19 December 1988 (aged 32)	178	(Germany) Rot-Weiss Köln
32	DF	Justen Blok	27 September 2000 (aged 20)	8	(Netherlands) Rotterdam

=== Wales ===
Head coach: Daniel Newcombe

Wales announced a 20-player squad on 21 May 2021. Their final squad was announced on 4 June 2021.

No.	Pos.	Player	Date of birth (age)	Caps	Club
1	GK	James Fortnam	18 May 1990 (aged 31)	40	(Wales) Cardiff & Met
3	DF	Daniel Kyriakides	21 March 1995 (aged 26)	83	(Germany) Crefelder HTC
4		Ioan Wall	28 April 1999 (aged 22)	28	(Wales) Cardiff & Met
6	DF	Jacob Draper	24 July 1998 (aged 22)	45	(England) Hampstead & Westminster
7		Joe Naughalty	13 April 1987 (aged 34)	96	(England) East Grinstead
8		Lewis Prosser (Captain)	13 June 1989 (aged 31)	151	(England) East Grinstead
9	FW	Rupert Shipperley (Captain)	21 November 1992 (aged 28)	70	(England) Hampstead & Westminster
10		Rhodri Furlong	18 October 1995 (aged 25)	55	(England) Hampstead & Westminster
11		James Carson	29 April 1994 (aged 27)	71	(England) Old Georgians
12		Stephen Kelly	12 May 1992 (aged 29)	57	(England) Hampstead & Westminster
13		Dale Hutchinson	23 October 1993 (aged 27)	80	(Wales) Cardiff & Met
15		Rhys Bradshaw	19 September 2000 (aged 20)	19	(England) University of Exeter
18		Gareth Furlong	10 May 1992 (aged 29)	114	(Netherlands) Tilburg
19		Owain Dolan-Gray	17 December 1990 (aged 30)	116	(Wales) Cardiff & Met
20		Jolyon Morgan	9 March 1999 (aged 22)	13	(Netherlands) Nijmegen
24		Hywel Jones	9 July 1997 (aged 23)	34	(England) Hampstead & Westminster
25		Benjamin Francis	20 March 1996 (aged 25)	75	(England) Wimbledon
26		Luke Hawker (Captain)	29 December 1989 (aged 31)	93	(Wales) Cardiff & Met
32	GK	Ieuan Tranter	7 November 1994 (aged 26)	22	(England) Surbiton
35		Fred Newbold	29 March 2001 (aged 20)	2	(England) Oxford University
