= Hockey at the 2014 Commonwealth Games – Men's team squads =

This article lists the squads of the men's hockey competition at the 2014 Commonwealth Games held in Glasgow, Scotland, from 25 July to 3 August 2014.

== Australia ==
Head coach: Graham Reid

- Simon Orchard
- Chris Ciriello
- Mark Knowles (capt)
- Eddie Ockenden
- Jake Whetton
- Matt Gohdes
- Aran Zalewski
- Tristan White
- Matthew Swann
- Daniel Beale
- Trent Mitton
- Kieran Govers
- Kiel Brown
- Andrew Philpott
- Andrew Charter (gk)
- Fergus Kavanagh

== Canada ==
Head coach: Anthony Farry

- Benjamin Martin
- Philip Wright
- Scott Tupper (capt)
- Richard Hildreth
- Keegan Pereira
- david Jameson
- Adam Froese
- Gordon Johnston
- Paul Wharton
- Mark Pearson
- Gabriel Ho-Garcia
- Iain Smythe
- Matthew Guest
- Sukhi Panesar
- Taylor Curran
- David Carter (gk)

== England ==
Head coach: Bobby Crutchley

- George Pinner (gk)
- Dan Fox
- Barry Middleton (capt)
- Henry Weir
- Ashley Jackson
- Simon Mantell
- Harry Martin
- Nick Catlin
- Alastair Brogdon
- Michael Hoare
- David Condon
- Mark Gleghorne
- Phil Roper
- Adam Dixon
- Iain Lewers
- Ollie Willars

== India ==
Head coach: Terry Walsh

- Rupinder Pal Singh
- Khadangbam Kothajit Singh
- Manpreet Singh
- Sardar Singh (capt)
- Dharamvir Singh
- V. R. Raghunath
- Gurbaj Singh
- Sreejesh Parattu Raveendran (gk)
- Danish Mujtaba
- Gurwinder Chandi
- S. V. Sunil
- Birendra Lakra
- Akashdeep Singh
- Chinglensana Kangujam
- Ramandeep Singh
- Chandanda Thimmaiah

== Malaysia ==
Head coach: Dhaarma Raj

- Norhizzat Sumantri
- Kevin Lim
- Selvaraju Sandrakasi
- Izwan Firdaus Ahmad Tajuddin
- Haziq Samsul
- Razie Rahim (capt)
- Faiz Jali
- Azri Hassan
- Azuan Hasan
- Hafizuddin Othman (gk)
- Baljit Singh Charun
- Rashid Baharom
- Ahmad Nasruddin
- Shahril Saabah
- Ramadan Rosli
- Irwan Nazli

== New Zealand ==
Head coach: Colin Batch

- Nick Haig
- Andy Hayward
- Simon Child
- Dean Couzins (capt)
- Blair Hilton
- Bradley Shaw
- Marcus Child
- Phil Burrows
- Alex Shaw
- Devon Manchester (gk)
- Blair Tarrant
- Shay Neal
- Arun Panchia
- Shea McAleese
- Hugo Inglis
- Steve Edwards

== Scotland ==
Head coach: Derek Forsyth

- Jamie Cachia (gk)
- Gareth Hall
- David Forsyth
- Nicky Parkes
- Michael Bremner
- Dan Coultas
- Alan Forsyth
- Chris Grassick (capt)
- Ian Moodie
- Gordon McIntyre
- Ross Stott
- Chris Nelson
- Kenny Bain
- William Marshall
- Iain Scholefield
- Niall Stott

== South Africa ==
Head coach: Fabian Gregory

- Jonathan Robinson
- Wade Paton
- Andrew Cronje
- Robin Jones
- Austin Smith (capt)
- Tim Drummond
- Julian Hykes
- Lloyd Norris-Jones
- Rhett Halkett
- Jean-Pierre de Voux
- Jethro Eustice
- Lungile Tsolekile
- Rassie Pieterse (gk)
- Ignatius Malgraff
- Taine Paton
- Clinton Panther

== Trinidad & Tobago ==
Head coach: Glen Francis & Kevin MacIntyre

- Aidande Gannes
- Solomon Eccles
- Kwan Browne
- Stefan Mouttet
- Akim Toussaint
- Dillet Gilkes
- Ishmael Campbell
- Darren Cowie (Capt)
- Nicholas Grant
- Michael O'Connor
- Marcus James
- Mickell Pierre
- Shaquille Daniel
- Jordan Reynos
- Tariq Marcano
- Andrey Rocke (gk)

== Wales ==
Head coach: Zak Jones

- Benjamin Carless
- Daniel Kyriakides
- Peter Swainson
- Lewis Prosser
- Andrew Cornick
- Matthew Ruxton (capt)
- Richard Gay
- Huw Jones
- Nicholas Rees
- Liam Brignull
- Rhys Gowman
- Gareth Furlong
- Owain Dolan-Gray
- Michael Shaw
- James Kyriakides
- David Kettle (gk)

== See also ==
- Hockey at the 2014 Commonwealth Games – Women's team squads
