= Wales at the 2018 Commonwealth Games =

- Flag of Wales
- CG code: WAL
- CGA: Commonwealth Games Wales
- Website: teamwales.cymru/en/

in Gold Coast, Australia 4 April 2018 – 15 April 2018
- Competitors: 213 in 16 sports
- Flag bearer: Jazz Carlin (opening)
- Medals Ranked 7th: Gold 10 Silver 12 Bronze 14 Total 36

Commonwealth Games appearances (overview)
- 1930; 1934; 1938; 1950; 1954; 1958; 1962; 1966; 1970; 1974; 1978; 1982; 1986; 1990; 1994; 1998; 2002; 2006; 2010; 2014; 2018; 2022; 2026; 2030

Wales competed at the 2018 Commonwealth Games in Gold Coast, Australia, from 4 April to 15 April 2018. It was Wales's 21st appearance at the Commonwealth Games, having competed at every Games since their inception in 1930.

Swimmer Jazz Carlin was the country's flag bearer during the opening ceremony.

== Competitors ==
The following is the list of number of competitors participating at the Games per sport/discipline.

Sport	Men	Women	Total
Athletics	14	12	26
Boxing	4	3	7
Cycling	15	6	21
Diving	1	0	1
Gymnastics	5	8	13
Hockey	18	18	36
Lawn Bowls	10	7	17
Netball	—N/a	12	12
Rugby Sevens	13	12	25
Shooting	8	3	11
Squash	2	2	4
Swimming	5	9	14
Table Tennis	1	3	4
Triathlon	2	2	4
Weightlifting	8	8	16
Wrestling	2	0	2
Total	108	105	213

== Medallists ==
Medal	Name	Sport	Event	Date
1st place, gold medalist(s)	Gareth Evans	Weightlifting	Men's 69 kg	6 April 2018
1st place, gold medalist(s)	Elinor Barker	Cycling	Women's points race	7 April 2018
1st place, gold medalist(s)	Olivia Breen	Athletics	Women's long jump (T38)	8 April 2018
1st place, gold medalist(s)	Hollie Arnold	Athletics	Women's javelin throw (F46)	9 April 2018
1st place, gold medalist(s)	Daniel Salmon; Marc Wyatt	Lawn bowls	Men's pairs	9 April 2018
1st place, gold medalist(s)	Alys Thomas	Swimming	Women's 200 metre butterfly	9 April 2018
1st place, gold medalist(s)	David Phelps	Shooting	Men's 50 metre rifle prone	10 April 2018
1st place, gold medalist(s)	Michael Wixey	Shooting	Men's trap	14 April 2018
1st place, gold medalist(s)	Sammy Lee	Boxing	Men's light heavyweight	14 April 2018
1st place, gold medalist(s)	Lauren Price	Boxing	Women's middleweight	14 April 2018
2nd place, silver medalist(s)	James Ball; Peter Mitchell (pilot)	Cycling	Men's tandem kilo B	5 April 2018
2nd place, silver medalist(s)	Lewis Oliva	Cycling	Men's keirin	6 April 2018
2nd place, silver medalist(s)	James Ball; Peter Mitchell (pilot)	Cycling	Men's tandem sprint B	7 April 2018
2nd place, silver medalist(s)	Laura Daniels	Lawn bowls	Women's singles	8 April 2018
2nd place, silver medalist(s)	Latalia Bevan	Gymnastics	Women's floor	9 April 2018
2nd place, silver medalist(s)	Ben Llewellin	Shooting	Men's skeet	9 April 2018
2nd place, silver medalist(s)	Chris Watson; Gareth Morris	Shooting	Queen's Prize pairs	10 April 2018
2nd place, silver medalist(s)	Daniel Jervis	Swimming	Men's 1500 metre freestyle	10 April 2018
2nd place, silver medalist(s)	Laura Halford	Gymnastics	Women's hoop	13 April 2018
2nd place, silver medalist(s)	Kane Charig	Wrestling	Men's freestyle 65 kg	13 April 2018
2nd place, silver medalist(s)	Rosie Eccles	Boxing	Women's welterweight	14 April 2018
2nd place, silver medalist(s)	Jon Mould	Cycling	Men's road race	14 April 2018
3rd place, bronze medalist(s)	Chloé Tutton	Swimming	Women's 200 metre breaststroke	7 April 2018
3rd place, bronze medalist(s)	Laura Hughes	Weightlifting	Women's 75 kg	8 April 2018
3rd place, bronze medalist(s)	Bethan Davies	Athletics	Women's 20 kilometre walk	8 April 2018
3rd place, bronze medalist(s)	Tesni Evans	Squash	Women's singles	9 April 2018
3rd place, bronze medalist(s)	Melissa Courtney	Athletics	Women's 1500 metres	10 April 2018
3rd place, bronze medalist(s)	Georgia Davies	Swimming	Women's 50 metre backstroke	10 April 2018
3rd place, bronze medalist(s)	Georgia Davies; Chloé Tutton; Alys Thomas; Kathryn Greenslade	Swimming	Women's 4 × 100 metre medley relay	10 April 2018
3rd place, bronze medalist(s)	Gilbert Miles (directed by Byron John); Julie Thomas (directed by John Wilson)	Lawn bowls	Mixed para-sport pairs	11 April 2018
3rd place, bronze medalist(s)	Olivia Breen	Athletics	Women's 100 metres (T38)	12 April 2018
3rd place, bronze medalist(s)	Curtis Dodge	Wrestling	Men's freestyle 74 kg	12 April 2018
3rd place, bronze medalist(s)	Mickey McDonagh	Boxing	Men's lightweight	13 April 2018
3rd place, bronze medalist(s)	Sarah Wixey	Shooting	Women's trap	13 April 2018
3rd place, bronze medalist(s)	Dani Rowe	Cycling	Women's road race	14 April 2018
3rd place, bronze medalist(s)	Joshua Stacey	Table tennis	Men's TT6–10 singles	14 April 2018

Medals by sport
Sport	1st place, gold medalist(s)	2nd place, silver medalist(s)	3rd place, bronze medalist(s)	Total
Athletics	2	0	3	5
Boxing	2	1	1	4
Cycling	1	4	1	6
Gymnastics	0	2	0	2
Lawn bowls	1	1	1	3
Shooting	2	2	1	5
Squash	0	0	1	1
Swimming	1	1	3	5
Table tennis	0	0	1	1
Weightlifting	1	0	1	2
Wrestling	0	1	1	2
Total	10	12	14	36

Medals by day
Day	1st place, gold medalist(s)	2nd place, silver medalist(s)	3rd place, bronze medalist(s)	Total
5 April	0	1	0	1
6 April	1	1	0	2
7 April	1	1	1	3
8 April	1	1	2	4
9 April	3	2	1	6
10 April	1	2	3	6
11 April	0	0	1	1
12 April	0	0	2	2
13 April	0	2	2	4
14 April	3	2	2	7
Total	10	12	14	36

Medals by gender
Gender	1st place, gold medalist(s)	2nd place, silver medalist(s)	3rd place, bronze medalist(s)	Total
Female	5	4	10	19
Male	5	8	3	16
Mixed	0	0	1	1
Total	10	12	14	36

== Athletics ==
Team Wales announced its provisional squad of athletes on 27 November 2017 and 24 January 2018. The current 27-strong squad of 14 men and 13 women is correct as of 12 March 2018. However, only 12 women competed.

Men
Track & road events

Athlete	Event	Heat		Semifinal		Final	
Athlete	Event	Result	Rank	Result	Rank	Result	Rank
James Ledger	100 m (T12)	11.77	3	—N/a		Did not advance	
Rhys Jones	100 m (T38)	—N/a				11.87	7
Morgan Jones	100 m (T47)	—N/a				11.93	4
Rowan Axe	1500 m	3:49.89	8	—N/a		Did not advance	
Tom Marshall	1500 m	3:50.95	8	—N/a		Did not advance	
David Omoregie	110 m hurdles	14.20	7	—N/a		Did not advance	
Dai Greene	400 m hurdles	Withdrew					
Jonathan Hopkins	3000 m steeplechase	—N/a				8:34.12	6
Ieuan Thomas	3000 m steeplechase	—N/a				8:40.02	7
Andrew Davies	Marathon	—N/a				2:26:05	11
Josh Griffiths	Marathon	—N/a				2:37:10	15

Field events

Athlete	Event	Final	
Athlete	Event	Distance	Rank
Osian Jones	Hammer throw	70.14	7

Combined events – Decathlon

Athlete	Event	100 m	LJ	SP	HJ	400 m	110H	DT	PV	JT	1500 m	Final	Rank
Ben Gregory	Result	11.60	6.94	12.80	1.89	50.31	15.16	38.85	4.80	57.30	4:30.57	7449	7
Ben Gregory	Points	732	799	655	705	800	830	641	849	697	741	7449	7
Curtis Mathews	Result	11.39	6.89	NM	1.89	DNS						DNF	
Curtis Mathews	Points	776	788	0	705	DNS						DNF	

Women
Track & road events

Athlete	Event	Heat		Final	
Athlete	Event	Result	Rank	Result	Rank
Olivia Breen	100 m (T38)	—N/a		13.35	3rd place, bronze medalist(s)
Melissa Courtney	1500 m	4:06.63	4 Q	4:03.44	3rd place, bronze medalist(s)
Melissa Courtney	5000 m	—N/a		15:46.60	9
Jennifer-Louise Nesbitt	10000 m	—N/a		32:58.14	17
Caryl Granville	100 m hurdles	13.98	6	Did not advance	
Caryl Granville	400 m hurdles	59.28	8	Did not advance	
Caryl Jones	Marathon	—N/a		2:43:58	8
Elinor Kirk	Marathon	—N/a		2:57:01	15
Bethan Davies	20 km walk	—N/a		1:36:08	3rd place, bronze medalist(s)
Heather Lewis	20 km walk	—N/a		1:41:45	7

Field events

Athlete	Event	Qualification		Final	
Athlete	Event	Distance	Position	Distance	Position
Sally Peake	Pole vault	—N/a		4.30	10
Rebecca Chapman	Long jump	6.02	15	Did not advance	
Olivia Breen	Long jump (T38)	—N/a		4.86 GR	1st place, gold medalist(s)
Carys Parry	Hammer throw	—N/a		61.58	6
Hollie Arnold	Javelin throw (F46)	—N/a		44.43 WR	1st place, gold medalist(s)

== Boxing ==
Team Wales announced its squad of 7 boxers (4 men and 3 women) on 24 January 2018.

Men

Athlete	Event	Round of 32	Round of 16	Quarterfinals	Semifinals	Final	Rank
Athlete	Event	Opposition Result	Opposition Result	Opposition Result	Opposition Result	Opposition Result	Rank
Mickey McDonagh	−60 kg	Bye	Mohlerepe (LES); W 5–0	Katua (PNG); W 5–0	Garside (AUS); L 2–3	Did not advance	3rd place, bronze medalist(s)
William Edwards	−64 kg	Ryan (ANT); W 5–0	Silungwe (ZAM); L 0–5	Did not advance			
Kyran Jones	−75 kg	Donnelly (NIR); L 1–4	Did not advance				
Sammy Lee	−81 kg	—N/a	Bye	Simbwa (UGA); W 3–1	Waterman (AUS); W 4–1	Plodzicki-Faoagali (SAM); W 5–0	1st place, gold medalist(s)

Women

Athlete	Event	Round of 16	Quarterfinals	Semifinals	Final	Rank
Athlete	Event	Opposition Result	Opposition Result	Opposition Result	Opposition Result	Rank
Lynsey Holdaway	−48 kg	Bye	O'Hara (NIR); L 2–3	Did not advance		
Rosie Eccles	−69 kg	Azangue (CMR); W 4–1	Maka (TGA); W 5–0	Scott (AUS); W 4–1	Ryan (ENG); L 2–3	2nd place, silver medalist(s)
Lauren Price	−75 kg	Bye	Gramane (MOZ); W 5–0	Thibeault (CAN); W 5–0	Parker (AUS); W 4–1	1st place, gold medalist(s)

== Cycling ==
Team Wales announced the selection of para-cyclist James Ball on 29 November 2017.

Most of the 21-strong squad of 15 men and 6 women was made public on 24 January 2018, with Pete Mitchell confirmed as a para-cycling pilot on 1 February 2018.

=== Road ===
Men

Athlete	Event	Time	Rank
Rhys Britton	Road race	DNF	
Dylan Kerfoot-Robson	Road race	3:59:35	31
Peter Kibble	Road race	3:59:39	41
Jon Mould	Road race	3:57:01	2nd place, silver medalist(s)
Luke Rowe	Road race	3:57:54	14
Peter Kibble	Time trial	52:55.24	15

Women

Athlete	Event	Time	Rank
Elinor Barker	Road race	3:02:25	7
Megan Barker	Road race	3:08:16	27
Hayley Jones	Road race	DNF	
Dani Rowe	Road race	3:02:18	3rd place, bronze medalist(s)
Manon Lloyd	Road race	DNF	
Jessica Roberts	Road race	DNF	

=== Track ===
Sprint

Athlete	Event	Qualification		Round 1	Quarterfinals	Semifinals	Final	
Athlete	Event	Time	Rank	Opposition Time	Opposition Time	Opposition Time	Opposition Time	Rank
Lewis Oliva	Men's sprint	9.737	8 Q	Barrette (CAN); W	Sahrom (MAS); L, L	Did not advance		
James Ball; Peter Mitchell (pilot)	Men's tandem sprint B	10.022	2 Q	—N/a		Rizan; Rasol (pilot) (MAS); W, W	Fachie; Rotherham (pilot) (SCO); L, L	2nd place, silver medalist(s)
Eleanor Coster	Women's sprint	11.533	14 Q	Hansen (NZL); L	Did not advance			
Rachel James	Women's sprint	11.039	6 Q	Mustapa (MAS); L	Did not advance			
Eleanor Coster; Rachel James	Women's team sprint	34.413	4 QB	—N/a			England; L 34.415	4

Keirin

Athlete	Event	Round 1	Repechage	Semifinals	Final
Lewis Oliva	Men's keirin	3 R	1 Q	3 Q	2nd place, silver medalist(s)
Eleanor Coster	Women's keirin	3 R	5	Did not advance	
Rachel James	Women's keirin	4 R	2 Q	5	9

Time trial

Athlete	Event	Time	Rank
Lewis Oliva	Men's time trial	1:02.198	13
Ethan Vernon	Men's time trial	1:02.935	16
James Ball; Peter Mitchell (pilot)	Men's tandem time trial B	1:00.900	2nd place, silver medalist(s)
Eleanor Coster	Women's time trial	35.700	11
Ciara Horne	Women's time trial	37.388	16
Rachel James	Women's time trial	34.780	7

Pursuit

Athlete	Event	Qualification		Final	
Athlete	Event	Time	Rank	Opponent Results	Rank
Samuel Harrison	Men's pursuit	4:19.429	10	Did not advance	
Ethan Vernon	Men's pursuit	4:27.548	17	Did not advance	
Rhys Britton; Samuel Harrison; Joe Holt; Zachery May; Ethan Vernon	Men's team pursuit	4:01.489	4 QB	Canada; L 4:01.362	4
Ciara Horne	Women's pursuit	3:35.153	8	Did not advance	
Hayley Jones	Women's pursuit	3:37.658	15	Did not advance	
Jessica Roberts	Women's pursuit	3:37.625	14	Did not advance	
Megan Barker; Ciara Horne; Hayley Jones; Manon Lloyd; Jessica Roberts	Women's team pursuit	4:24.825	5	Did not advance	

Points race

Athlete	Event	Qualification		Final	
Athlete	Event	Points	Rank	Points	Rank
Samuel Harrison	Men's point race	25	2 Q	0	19
Joe Holt	Men's point race	27	3 Q	6	13
Jon Mould	Men's point race	7	8 Q	45	7
Elinor Barker	Women's points race	—N/a		40	1st place, gold medalist(s)
Dani Rowe	Women's points race	—N/a		1	14
Jessica Roberts	Women's points race	—N/a		3	12

Scratch race

Athlete	Event	Qualification	Final
Rhys Britton	Men's scratch race	8 Q	14
Joe Holt	Men's scratch race	5 Q	16
Jon Mould	Men's scratch race	5 Q	9
Elinor Barker	Women's scratch race	—N/a	12
Megan Barker	Women's scratch race	—N/a	11
Manon Lloyd	Women's scratch race	—N/a	9

=== Mountain bike ===
Athlete	Event	Time	Rank
Dylan Kerfoot-Robson	Men's cross-country	1:26:37	11

== Diving ==
On 24 January 2018, it was announced that Aidan Heslop will be the first diver in 20 years to represent Wales at the Commonwealth Games.

Men

Athlete	Event	Preliminaries		Final	
Athlete	Event	Points	Rank	Points	Rank
Aidan Heslop	3 m springboard	352.80	11 Q	285.15	12
Aidan Heslop	10 m platform	385.10	5 Q	395.95	6

== Gymnastics ==
Team Wales announced its squad of 13 gymnasts (5 men and 8 women) on 23 February 2018.

=== Artistic ===
Men
Team Final & Individual Qualification

Athlete	Event	Apparatus						Total	Rank
Athlete	Event	F	PH	R	V	PB	HB	Total	Rank
Joshua Cook	Team	~~12.300~~	12.050	13.100	13.850	12.300	~~12.350~~	75.950	17 Q
Jac Davies	Team	13.850	14.350	—N/a	13.100	—N/a		—N/a	
Benjamin Eyre	Team	13.700	12.100	~~12.050~~	~~11.375~~	~~11.200~~	13.075	73.500	22
Iwan Mepham	Team	—N/a		12.500	—N/a	13.775	12.850	—N/a	
Clinton Purnell	Team	12.900	~~11.850~~	12.875	13.800	12.700	12.500	76.625	14 Q
Total	Team	40.450	38.500	38.475	40.750	38.775	38.425	235.375	7

Individual Finals

Athlete	Event	Apparatus						Total	Rank
Athlete	Event	F	PH	R	V	PB	HB	Total	Rank
Joshua Cook	All-around	13.450	12.100	13.050	13.800	12.550	12.200	77.150	13
Jac Davies	Floor	12.800	—N/a					12.800	7
Jac Davies	Pommel horse	—N/a	14.233	—N/a				14.233	4
Iwan Mepham	Parallel bars	—N/a				12.366	—N/a	12.366	8
Clinton Purnell	All-around	Withdrew							

Women
Team Final & Individual Qualification

Athlete	Event	Apparatus				Total	Rank
Athlete	Event	V	UB	BB	F	Total	Rank
Latalia Bevan	Team	13.400	12.900	12.750	13.000	52.050	7 Q
Holly Jones	Team	13.850	—N/a		~~11.850~~	—N/a	
Maisie Methuen	Team	~~13.300~~	13.150	13.250	12.600	52.300	6 Q
Jolie Ruckley	Team	—N/a	12.050	~~12.300~~	—N/a	—N/a	
Emily Thomas	Team	13.525	~~11.950~~	12.500	13.000	50.975	9
Total	Team	40.775	38.100	38.500	38.600	155.975	4

Individual Finals

Athlete	Event	Apparatus				Total	Rank
Athlete	Event	V	UB	BB	F	Total	Rank
Latalia Bevan	All-around	13.700	12.800	12.750	13.300	52.550	6
Latalia Bevan	Uneven bars	—N/a	10.500	—N/a		10.500	8
Latalia Bevan	Balance beam	—N/a		10.700	—N/a	10.700	8
Latalia Bevan	Floor	—N/a			13.300	13.300	2nd place, silver medalist(s)
Holly Jones	Vault	13.816	—N/a			13.816	4
Maisie Methuen	All-around	13.600	12.900	13.300	12.750	52.550	7
Maisie Methuen	Uneven bars	—N/a	12.775	—N/a		12.775	7
Maisie Methuen	Balance beam	—N/a		12.266	—N/a	12.266	7
Emily Thomas	Floor	—N/a			12.866	12.866	6

=== Rhythmic ===
Team Final & Individual Qualification

Athlete	Event	Apparatus				Total	Rank
Athlete	Event	Hoop	Ball	Clubs	Ribbon	Total	Rank
Laura Halford	Team	13.600	12.800	11.450	11.750	49.950	4 Q
Abigail Hanford	Team	7.700	~~6.850~~	8.650	~~4.900~~	28.100	25
Gemma Frizelle	Team	13.400	11.400	9.150	10.350	44.300	15 Q
Total	Team	34.700	24.200	29.250	22.100	110.250	5

Individual Finals

Athlete	Event	Apparatus				Total	Rank
Athlete	Event	Hoop	Ball	Clubs	Ribbon	Total	Rank
Laura Halford	All-around	12.450	13.300	13.300	11.600	50.650	5
Laura Halford	Hoop	14.000	—N/a			14.000	2nd place, silver medalist(s)
Laura Halford	Ball	—N/a	12.700	—N/a		12.700	4
Laura Halford	Ribbon	—N/a			11.900	11.900	4
Gemma Frizelle	All-around	11.000	11.650	9.275	11.200	43.125	12
Gemma Frizelle	Hoop	11.300	—N/a			11.300	8

== Hockey ==
Wales qualified both men's and women's teams by placing in the top nine (excluding the host nation, Australia) among Commonwealth nations in the FIH World Rankings as of 31 October 2017. Each team consists of 18 players for a total of 36.

Both teams were announced on 1 March 2018.

=== Men's tournament ===
Roster

- Lewis Prosser
- Luke Hawker
- David Kettle
- James Fortnam
- Jacob Draper
- Dale Hutchinson
- Rhys Gowman
- Daniel Kyriakides
- James Kyriakides
- Alf Dinnie
- Ben Francis
- Gareth Furlong
- Hywel Jones
- Rupert Shipperley
- Jonny Gooch
- Steve Kelly
- Owain Dolan Gray
- James Carson

Pool B

Pos	Team	Pld	W	D	L	GF	GA	GD	Pts	Qualification
1	India	4	3	1	0	12	9	+3	10	Advance to Semi-finals
2	England	4	2	1	1	15	8	+7	7	Advance to Semi-finals
3	Malaysia	4	1	1	2	5	10	−5	4	5th–6th place match
4	Pakistan	4	0	4	0	6	6	0	4	7th–8th place match
5	Wales	4	0	1	3	6	11	−5	1	9th–10th place match

Source: FIH
Rules for classification: 1) points; 2) number of wins; 3) goal difference; 4) goals scored; 5) head-to-head results.

5 April 2018
19:30

Pakistan	1–1	Wales
Ali 39'	Report	Shipperley 33'

Umpires:
Sean Rapaport (RSA)
David Sweetman (GBR)

7 April 2018
09:30

Malaysia	3–0	Wales
Fitri 19' van Huizen 36'; Faizal 55'	Report

Umpires:
Tim Bond (NZL)
Sean Rapaport (RSA)

8 April 2018
19:30

India	4–3	Wales
D. Singh 16'; Mand. Singh 28'; H. Singh 57'; Sunil 59'	Report	Furlong 17', 45', 58'

Umpires:
David Sweetman (SCO)
Tyler Klenk (CAN)

10 April 2018
14:30

England	3–2	Wales
Ward 38', 49', 57'	Report	Hawker 26'; Francis 30+'

Umpires:
Eric Koh (MAS)
Ben de Young (AUS)

9th–10th place match

13 April 2018
08:30

South Africa	2–3	Wales
Crowe 19'; Cassiem 46'	Report	Furlong 27'; Carson 27', 59'

Umpires:
Ben de Young (AUS)
Tyler Klenk (CAN)

=== Women's tournament ===
Roster

- Leah Wilkinson
- Sian French
- Rose Thomas
- Ella Jackson
- Julie Whiting
- Natasha Marke-Jones
- Sophie Clayton
- Sarah Jones
- Lisa Daley
- Phoebe Richards
- Tina Evans
- Dannielle Jordan
- Eloise Laity
- Beth Bingham
- Izzie Howell
- Delyth Thomas
- Xenna Hughes
- Jo Westwood

Pool B

Pos	Team	Pld	W	D	L	GF	GA	GD	Pts	Qualification
1	England	4	3	0	1	11	3	+8	9	Advance to Semi-finals
2	India	4	3	0	1	9	5	+4	9	Advance to Semi-finals
3	South Africa	4	1	1	2	3	4	−1	4	5th–6th place match
4	Malaysia	4	1	1	2	3	8	−5	4	7th–8th place match
5	Wales	4	1	0	3	4	10	−6	3	9th–10th place match

Source: FIH
Rules for classification: 1) points; 2) number of wins; 3) goal difference; 4) goals scored; 5) head-to-head results.

5 April 2018
09:30

India	2–3	Wales
Rampal 34'; Pradhan 41'	Report	Daley 7'; French 26'; Marke-Jones 57'

Umpires:
Aleisha Neumann (AUS)
Jo Cumming (NZL)

6 April 2018
19:30

England	5–1	Wales
Ansley 23'; Townsend 25'; Martin 48'; Bray 53'; Balsdon 60'	Report	Laity 34'

Umpires:
Lelia Sacre (CAN)
Ayanna McClean (TTO)

9 April 2018
14:30

South Africa	2–0	Wales
Manuel 25'; Mayne 41'	Report

Umpires:
Emma Shelbourn (ENG)
Jo Cumming (NZL)

11 April 2018
09:30

Malaysia	1–0	Wales
Hanis 23'	Report

Umpires:
Ayanna McClean (TTO)
Cookie Tan (SGP)

9th–10th place match

12 April 2018
13:30

Wales	1–1	Ghana
Evans 53'	Report	Boakye 44'
Penalties
French (penalty shoot-out scored); Jones (penalty shoot-out scored); Evans (penalty shoot-out missed)	2–0	(penalty shoot-out missed) Umaru; (penalty shoot-out missed) Amoako; (penalty shoot-out missed) Opoku; (penalty shoot-out missed) Afriyie

Umpires:
Durga Devi (IND)
Emma Shelbourn (ENG)

== Lawn bowls ==
Team Wales announced its squad of 17 lawn bowlers and directors (10 men and 7 women) in two tranches.

The first tranche of 7 participants was announced on 29 November 2017; the second tranche of 10 participants was announced on 24 January 2018.

Men

Athlete	Event	Group Stage						Quarterfinal	Semifinal	Final / BM	
Athlete	Event	Opposition Score	Opposition Score	Opposition Score	Opposition Score	Opposition Score	Rank	Opposition Score	Opposition Score	Opposition Score	Rank
Daniel Salmon	Singles	Jones (NFI); W 21–13	Breitenbach (RSA); L 15–21	Aquilina (MLT); W 21–18	Paniani (COK); W 21–17	Wilson (AUS); L 16–21	3	Did not advance			10
Daniel Salmon; Marc Wyatt	Pairs	Isle of Man; W 22–11	South Africa; L 15–17	Jamaica; W 33–4	Northern Ireland; W 27–8	—N/a	2 Q	New Zealand; W 20–7	Cook Islands; W 21–14	Scotland; W 12–10	1st place, gold medalist(s)
Steve Harris; Ross Owen; Jonathan Tomlinson	Triples	India; W 23–9	South Africa; W 22–6	Papua New Guinea; W 27–10	England; L 16–17	—N/a	2 Q	Scotland; L 13–15	Did not advance		6
Steve Harris; Ross Owen; Jonathan Tomlinson; Marc Wyatt	Fours	Papua New Guinea; W 13–10	Canada; W 23–10	Cook Islands; W 14–4	New Zealand; L 10–11	—N/a	2 Q	India; W 17–15	Australia; L 5–15	England; L 9–15	4

Women

Athlete	Event	Group Stage					Quarterfinal	Semifinal	Final / BM	
Athlete	Event	Opposition Score	Opposition Score	Opposition Score	Opposition Score	Rank	Opposition Score	Opposition Score	Opposition Score	Rank
Laura Daniels	Singles	Beere (GUE); W 21–15	Matali (BRU); W 21–10	Macdonald (JER); W 21–11	Brown (SCO); L 13–21	2 Q	Anderson (NFI); W 21–13	McKerihen (CAN); W 21–13	Edwards (NZL); L 17–21	2nd place, silver medalist(s)
Laura Daniels; Jess Sims	Pairs	India; L 16–20	Jersey; W 22–14	Northern Ireland; W 18–13	South Africa; L 17–23	4	Did not advance			13
Anwen Butten; Caroline Taylor; Emma Woodcock	Triples	Jersey; W 18–7	Zambia; W 23–20	Namibia; W 15–14	New Zealand; L 15–19	2 Q	England; L 11–16	Did not advance		7
Anwen Butten; Jess Sims; Caroline Taylor; Emma Woodcock	Fours	Canada; L 11–25	Niue; W 30–7	Scotland; L 10–22	—N/a	3	Did not advance			12

Para-sport

Athlete	Event	Group Stage						Semifinal	Final / BM	
Athlete	Event	Opposition Score	Opposition Score	Opposition Score	Opposition Score	Opposition Score	Rank	Opposition Score	Opposition Score	Rank
Gilbert Miles (directed by Byron John); Julie Thomas (directed by John Wilson)	Pairs	New Zealand; L 11–14	Scotland; W 13–7	England; W 21–11	Australia; L 6–18	South Africa; L 8–11	4 Q	South Africa; L 9–11	Scotland; W 13–12	3rd place, bronze medalist(s)
Jonathan Hubbard; Raymond Lillycrop; Pauline Wilson	Triples	New Zealand; L 5–26	Scotland; L 4–27	South Africa; L 4–21	Australia; L 12–22	England; W 15–13	6	Did not advance		6

== Netball ==
Wales qualified a netball team by virtue of being ranked in the top 11 (excluding the host nation, Australia) of the INF World Rankings on July 1, 2017.

The following is the Wales roster in the netball tournament of the 2018 Commonwealth Games. It was announced on 1 March 2018.

Wales national netball team – 2018 Commonwealth Games roster
Players
Coaches

Pos.	Name	Age - DOB	Ht.	Club	Club nat.
	Davies, Fern	-	–	Celtic Dragons	(Wales)
	Drane, Suzy (C)	-	–	Celtic Dragons	(Wales)
	Dyke, Bethan	-	–	Celtic Dragons	(Wales)
	Jones, Kyra	-	–	Celtic Dragons	(Wales)
	Jones, Nia	-	–	Celtic Dragons	(Wales)
	Lewis, Chelsea	-	–	Team Bath	(England)
	Llewelyn, Sarah	-	–	Celtic Dragons	(Wales)
	Morgan, Kelly	-	–	Celtic Dragons	(Wales)
	Moseley, Cara Lea	-	–	Celtic Dragons	(Wales)
	Rowe, Georgia	-	–	Celtic Dragons	(Wales)
	Thomas, Leila	-	–	Celtic Dragons	(Wales)
	Varey, Amanda	-	–	Celtic Dragons	(Wales)

Head coach

Julie Hoornweg

Legend

- (C) Team captain
- Club field describes current pro club
- Injured

Pool B

Pos	Team	Pld	W	D	L	GF	GA	GD	Pts	Qualification
1	England	5	5	0	0	342	202	+140	10	Semi-finals
2	New Zealand	5	3	0	2	292	235	+57	6	Semi-finals
3	Uganda	5	3	0	2	287	248	+39	6	Classification matches
4	Malawi	5	3	0	2	277	284	−7	6	Classification matches
5	Scotland	5	1	0	4	195	289	−94	2	Classification matches
6	Wales	5	0	0	5	215	350	−135	0	Classification matches

Updated to match(es) played on 11 April 2018. Source: GC2018

6 April 2018
13:00

Report
Wales
44–70
New Zealand

Gold Coast Convention and Exhibition Centre
Umpires: Theresa Prince
Jackie Mizon
Reserve umpire: Joshua Bowring
Moseley 21/30 (70%)
Lewis 21/31 (68%)
Llewelyn 1/1 (100%)
Rowe 1/2 (50%)

Selby-Rickit 28/31 (90%)
Folau 19/23 (83%)
Ekenasio 13/17 (76%)
Mes 10/14 (71%)

7 April 2018
18:30

Report
Scotland
51–47
Wales

Gold Coast Convention and Exhibition Centre
Umpires: Helen George
Angela Armstrong-Lush
Reserve umpire: Marc Henning
Goodwin 38/45 (84%)
Gallagher 13/14 (93%)

Lewis 39/48 (81%)
Moseley 5/8 (63%)
Llewelyn 3/3 (100%)

9 April 2018
13:00

Report
England
85–31
Wales

Gold Coast Convention and Exhibition Centre
Umpires: Helen George
Theresa Prince
Reserve umpire: Lisa McPhail
Housby 34/36 (94%)
Harten 26/32 (81%)
Haythornthwaite 13/14 (93%)
Corbin 12/14 (86%)

Lewis 22/28 (79%)
Rowe 5/6 (83%)
Moseley 4/6 (67%)

10 April 2018
20:30

Report
Wales
40–76
Uganda

Gold Coast Convention and Exhibition Centre
Umpires: Marc Henning
Joshua Bowring
Reserve umpire: Angela Armstrong-Lush
Lewis 34/42 (81%)
Rowe 6/7 (86%)
Llewelyn 0/1 (0%)

Proscovia 56/63 (89%)
Nanyonga 20/24 (83%)

11 April 2018
19:00

Report
Malawi
68–53
Wales

Gold Coast Convention and Exhibition Centre
Umpires: Joshua Bowring
Jono Bredin
Reserve umpire: Jackie Mizon
Kumwenda 47/50 (94%)
Chimaliro 18/18 (100%)
Simtowe 3/4 (75%)

Lewis 41/53 (77%)
Llewlyn 9/10 (90%)
Moseley 3/5 (60%)

Eleventh place match

12 April 2018
16:00

Report
Fiji
32–81
Wales

Gold Coast Convention and Exhibition Centre
Umpires: Angela Armstrong-Lush
Kate Stephenson
Reserve umpire: Lisa McPhail
Cirikisuva 10/12 (83%)
Waqa 9/12 (75%)
M. Rusivakula 7/10 (70%)
U. Rusivakula 6/6 (100%)

Lewis 35/39 (90%)
Rowe 25/26 (96%)
Moseley 12/12 (100%)
Llewelyn 9/12 (75%)

== Rugby sevens ==
Wales qualified a team of 12 men by being among the top nine ranked nations from the Commonwealth in the 2016–17 World Rugby Sevens Series ranking. In addition, they qualified a team of 12 women by being the top ranked Commonwealth nation in the 2017 Rugby Europe Women's Sevens Grand Prix among those not already qualified though the 2016–17 World Rugby Women's Sevens Series ranking. During the tournament, Harri Millard replaced the injured Morgan Williams.

The women's team was announced on 12 March 2018, followed by the men's team on 19 March 2018.

=== Men's tournament ===
Squad

- Luke Treharne
- Ethan Davies
- Morgan Williams
- James Benjamin
- Angus O'Brien
- Adam Thomas
- Luke Morgan
- Justin Tipuric
- Owen Jenkins
- Hallam Amos
- Benjamin Roach
- Tom Williams
- Harri Millard

Pool D

Pos	Team	Pld	W	D	L	PF	PA	PD	Pts	Qualification
1	Fiji	3	3	0	0	138	22	+116	9	Semi-finals
2	Wales	3	2	0	1	90	38	+52	7	Classification semi-finals
3	Uganda	3	1	0	2	38	95	−57	5	
4	Sri Lanka	3	0	0	3	27	138	−111	3	

Source: GC2018
Rules for classification: 1) Points; 2) Head-to-head result; 3) Point difference; 4) Points scored.

14 April 2018
10:59

Wales	31–5	Uganda
Try: Jenkins 1' m Morgan 3' m Williams 8' c Treharne 9' c Amos 14' c Con: O'Brien (1/3) 9'; Davies (2/2) 10', 14'	(Gold Coast 2018)	Try: Odongo 11' m Con: Wokorach (0/1)

Robina Stadium, Gold Coast
Referee: Richard Haughton (England)

14 April 2018
17:31

Wales	42–12	Sri Lanka
Try: Roach (2) 3' c, 12' c Thomas 4' c Williams 6' c Jenkins 7' c Davies 13' c Con: Davies (6/6) 3', 4', 6', 7', 12', 14'	(Gold Coast 2018)	Try: Wijekoon 1' c Sooriyabandara 9' m Con: Ratwatte (1/2) 1'

Robina Stadium, Gold Coast
Referee: Tevita Rokovereni (Fiji)

14 April 2018
21:33

Fiji	21–17	Wales
	(Gold Coast 2018)

Robina Stadium, Gold Coast
Referee: Sam Grove-White (Scotland)

Classification semi-finals

15 April 2018
10:37

Scotland	19–12	Wales
Try: Horne (2) 3' c, 6' c Farndale 11' m Con: Horne (2/3) 4', 6'	(Gold Coast 2018)	Try: Morgan (2) 2' m, 8' c Con: Davies (1/2) 8'

Robina Stadium, Gold Coast
Referee: Jordan Way (Australia)

Match for seventh place

15 April 2018
13:11

Kenya	24–28	Wales
Try: Ambaka (2) 1' c, 9' m Odhiambo (2) 7' c, 14'; Con: Agero (2/3) 2', 7'	(Gold Coast 2018)	Try: Williams (2) 1' c, 4' c Morgan 10' c Treharne 12' c Con: Davies (2/2) 1', 4'; O'Brien (2/2) 10', 12'

Robina Stadium, Gold Coast
Referee: Richard Haughton (England)

=== Women's tournament ===
Squad

- Sinead Breeze
- Laurie Harries
- Sioned Harries
- Hannah Jones
- Jasmine Joyce
- Bethan Lewis
- Lucy Packer
- Kayleigh Powell
- Shona Powell-Hughes
- Gemma Rowland
- Elinor Snowsill
- Sian Williams

Pool B

Pos	Team	Pld	W	D	L	PF	PA	PD	Pts	Qualification
1	Australia	3	3	0	0	80	27	+53	9	Semi-finals
2	England	3	2	0	1	74	34	+40	7	Semi-finals
3	Fiji	3	1	0	2	44	41	+3	5	Classification semi-finals
4	Wales	3	0	0	3	12	108	−96	3	Classification semi-finals

Source: GC2018
Rules for classification: 1) Points; 2) Head-to-head result; 3) Point difference; 4) Points scored.

13 April 2018
17:37

Australia	34–5	Wales
Try: Tonegato 1' m Pelite 2' c Green (2) 6' m, 8' m Williams 7' m du Toit 12' c Con: Sykes (2/6) 3', 13'	(Gold Coast 2018)	Try: Joyce 10' m Con: Snowsill (0/1)

Robina Stadium, Gold Coast
Referee: Rebecca Mahoney (New Zealand)

13 April 2018
19:55

Fiji	29–7	Wales
Try: Tinai (3) 1' c, 5' c, 8' m Riwai 3' m Naimasi 10' m Con: Tinai (2/4) 1', 5'; Riwai (0/1)	(Gold Coast 2018)	Try: Joyce 13' c Con: Packer (1/1) 13'

Robina Stadium, Gold Coast
Referee: Rose LaBreche (Canada)

13 April 2018
18:59

England	45–0	Wales
Try: Fleming 1' c Hunt (2) 2' c, 6' m Scarratt 4' c Scott 8' c Wilson-Hardy (2) 9' m, 14' c Con: Hunt (3/5) 1', 2', 4'; Scott (2/2) 8', 14'	(Gold Coast 2018)	Cards: Powell Hughes (yellow card) 12' to 14'

Robina Stadium, Gold Coast
Referee: Aimee Barrett-Theron (South Africa)

Classification semi-finals

15 April 2018	Kenya	14–12	Wales	Gold Coast
9:53

Match for seventh place

15 April 2018	South Africa	14–19	Wales	Gold Coast
12:27

== Shooting ==
Team Wales announced its squad of 11 shooters (8 men and 3 women) on 24 January 2018.

Men

Athlete	Event	Qualification		Final	
Athlete	Event	Points	Rank	Points	Rank
Craig Auden	10 metre air pistol	551–11x	15	Did not advance	
Michael Bamsey	50 metre rifle 3 positions	1145–40x	9	Did not advance	
Michael Bamsey	50 metre rifle prone	604.8	18	Did not advance	
Michael Bamsey	10 metre air rifle	617.3	5 Q	183.1	5
Jonathan Davis	Trap	105	26	Did not advance	
Ben Llewellin	Skeet	122+4	2 Q	56	2nd place, silver medalist(s)
David Phelps	50 metre rifle prone	613.7	7 Q	248.8 FGR	1st place, gold medalist(s)
Michael Wixey	Trap	120	1 Q	46 GR	1st place, gold medalist(s)

Women

Athlete	Event	Qualification		Final	
Athlete	Event	Points	Rank	Points	Rank
Sian Corish	50 metre rifle 3 positions	572	9	Did not advance	
Sian Corish	10 metre air rifle	409.6	8 Q	160.2	6
Coral Kennerley	10 metre air pistol	374–7x	7 Q	174.0	5
Sarah Wixey	Trap	69+2	1 Q	28	3rd place, bronze medalist(s)

Open

Athlete	Event	Day 1		Day 2		Day 3		Total	
Athlete	Event	Points	Rank	Points	Rank	Points	Rank	Overall	Rank
Gareth Morris	Queen's prize individual	103–13v	15	148–17v	13	148–15v	4	399–45v	10
Chris Watson	Queen's prize individual	103–8v	20	147–14v	17	147–13v	11	397–35v	16
Gareth Morris; Chris Watson	Queen's prize pairs	297–34v	6	285–24v	1	—N/a		582–58v	2nd place, silver medalist(s)

== Squash ==
Team Wales announced its squad of 4 players (2 men and 2 women) on 24 January 2018.

Singles

Athlete	Event	Round of 64	Round of 32	Round of 16	Quarterfinals	Semifinals	Final	Rank
Athlete	Event	Opposition Score	Opposition Score	Opposition Score	Opposition Score	Opposition Score	Opposition Score	Rank
Joel Makin (11)	Men's singles	Pala (FIJ); W 3–0	Franklin (BER); W 3–0	Binnie (JAM); W 3–0	Clyne (SCO); W 3–2	Coll (NZL); L 2–3	Adnan (MAS); L 2–3	4
Peter Creed (15)	Men's singles	Walters (JAM); L 1–3	Did not advance					
Tesni Evans (6)	Women's singles	Bye	Fernandes (GUY); W 3–0	Azman (MAS); W 3–1	Massaro (ENG); W 3–1	Perry (ENG); L 0–3	David (MAS); W 3–1	3rd place, bronze medalist(s)
Deon Saffery	Women's singles	Zafar (PAK); W 3–0	King (NZL); L 0–3	Did not advance				

Doubles

Athlete	Event	Group stage				Round of 16	Quarterfinals	Semifinals	Final	
Athlete	Event	Opposition Score	Opposition Score	Opposition Score	Rank	Opposition Score	Opposition Score	Opposition Score	Opposition Score	Rank
Peter Creed; Joel Makin	Men's doubles	Sierra Leone; W 2–0 WO	India; L 1–2	—N/a	2 Q	Australia; L 0–2	Did not advance			
Tesni Evans; Deon Saffery	Women's doubles	Malta; W 2–0	India; L 1–2	Pakistan; W 2–0	2 Q	—N/a	Australia; L 1–2	Did not advance		
Tesni Evans; Peter Creed	Mixed doubles	Kenya; W 2–0	Cayman Islands; W 2–0	—N/a	1 Q	Pakistan; W 2–0	India; L 0–2	Did not advance		

== Swimming ==
Team Wales announced the selection of two para-swimmers on 20 December 2017. The remainder of its 14-strong squad of 5 men and 9 women was made public on 24 January 2018.

Men

Athlete	Event	Heat		Semifinal		Final	
Athlete	Event	Time	Rank	Time	Rank	Time	Rank
Calum Jarvis	100 m freestyle	49.65	=10 Q	49.77	13	Did not advance	
Calum Jarvis	200 m freestyle	1:47.08	3 Q	—N/a		1:46.53	5
Alex Rosser	200 m freestyle S14	2:07.34	6 Q	—N/a		2:05.60	6
Jack Thomas	200 m freestyle S14	2:03.17	5 Q	—N/a		2:05.38	5
Daniel Jervis	400 m freestyle	3:48.18	2 Q	—N/a		3:48.08	4
Daniel Jervis	1500 m freestyle	—N/a				14:48.67	2nd place, silver medalist(s)
Xavier Castelli	50 m backstroke	25.91	6 Q	25.74	7 Q	25.44	4
Xavier Castelli	100 m backstroke	55.51	8 Q	55.13	8 Q	54.60	5
Xavier Castelli	200 m backstroke	2:00.08	7 Q	—N/a		1:59.27	8
Calum Jarvis	100 m butterfly	54.26	10 Q	53.33	5 Q	53.36	7
Xavier Castelli	200 m individual medley	2:00.97	7 Q	—N/a		2:01.49	8

Women

Athlete	Event	Heat		Semifinal		Final	
Athlete	Event	Time	Rank	Time	Rank	Time	Rank
Kathryn Greenslade	100 m freestyle	DNS		Did not advance			
Kathryn Greenslade	200 m freestyle	1:59.66	9	—N/a		Did not advance	
Ellena Jones	200 m freestyle	2:01.47	11	—N/a		Did not advance	
Ellena Jones	400 m freestyle	4:18.92	13	—N/a		Did not advance	
Jazmin Carlin	800 m freestyle	8:36.52	4 Q	—N/a		8:37.45	6
Ellena Jones	800 m freestyle	8:43.89	7 Q	—N/a		8:43.94	7
Georgia Davies	50 m backstroke	27.91	2 Q	27.86	1 Q	27.90	3rd place, bronze medalist(s)
Harriet West	50 m backstroke	29.46	16 Q	29.35	15	Did not advance	
Georgia Davies	100 m backstroke	1:00.57	4 Q	1:00.33	5 Q	1:00.17	5
Harriet West	100 m backstroke	DNS		Did not advance			
Kathryn Greenslade	200 m backstroke	DNS		—N/a		Did not advance	
Beth Sloan	50 m breaststroke	32.91	20	Did not advance			
Chloe Tutton	50 m breaststroke	31.24	8 Q	31.43	10	Did not advance	
Beth Sloan	100 m breaststroke	1:11.34	19	Did not advance			
Chloe Tutton	100 m breaststroke	1:09.06	9 Q	1:08.54	8 Q	1:07.87	5
Beth Sloan	200 m breaststroke	2:29.94	14	—N/a		Did not advance	
Chloe Tutton	200 m breaststroke	2:25.08	3 Q	—N/a		2:23.42	3rd place, bronze medalist(s)
Harriet Jones	50 m butterfly	27.10	=9 Q	27.03	9	Did not advance	
Alys Thomas	50 m butterfly	26.95	7 Q	26.72	6 Q	26.78	6
Harriet West	50 m butterfly	27.41	11 Q	27.17	10	Did not advance	
Harriet Jones	100 m butterfly	59.56	10 Q	59.49	10	Did not advance	
Alys Thomas	100 m butterfly	58.48	3 Q	58.17	5 Q	58.06	7
Harriet West	100 m butterfly	59.77	13 Q	59.93	13	Did not advance	
Harriet Jones	200 m butterfly	2:14.35	14	—N/a		Did not advance	
Alys Thomas	200 m butterfly	2:07.72	1 Q	—N/a		2:05.45 GR	1st place, gold medalist(s)
Kathryn Greenslade; Ellena Jones; Jazmin Carlin; Chloe Tutton	4 × 200 m freestyle relay	—N/a				8:03.00	5
Georgia Davies; Chloe Tutton; Alys Thomas; Kathryn Greenslade	4 × 100 m medley relay	—N/a				4:00.75	3rd place, bronze medalist(s)

== Table tennis ==
Team Wales announced the selection of parasport player Joshua Stacey on 29 November 2017. Three women were added to the squad on 24 January 2018.

Singles

Athletes	Event	Group Stage			Round of 32	Round of 16	Quarterfinal	Semifinal	Final	Rank
Athletes	Event	Opposition Score	Opposition Score	Rank	Opposition Score	Opposition Score	Opposition Score	Opposition Score	Opposition Score	Rank
Charlotte Carey	Women's singles	Bye			Ho (MAS); L 2–4	Did not advance				
Anna Hursey	Women's singles	Nambozo (UGA); W 4–0	Chang (MAS); L 0–4	2	Did not advance					
Chloe Thomas	Women's singles	Khan (PAK); W 4–0	Freeman (SKN); W 4–0	1 Q	Feng (AUS); L 0–4	Did not advance				

Doubles

Athletes	Event	Round of 32	Round of 16	Quarterfinal	Semifinal	Final	Rank
Athletes	Event	Opposition Score	Opposition Score	Opposition Score	Opposition Score	Opposition Score	Rank
Charlotte Carey; Chloe Thomas	Women's doubles	Bye	India; L 1–3	Did not advance			

Team

Athletes	Event	Group Stage			Quarterfinal	Semifinal	Final	Rank
Athletes	Event	Opposition Score	Opposition Score	Rank	Opposition Score	Opposition Score	Opposition Score	Rank
Charlotte Carey; Anna Hursey; Chloe Thomas	Women's team	India; L 1–3	Sri Lanka; W 3–1	2 Q	Australia; L 1–3	Did not advance		

Para-sport

Athletes	Event	Group Stage				Semifinal	Final	Rank
Athletes	Event	Opposition Score	Opposition Score	Opposition Score	Rank	Opposition Score	Opposition Score	Rank
Joshua Stacey	Men's TT6–10	Daybell (ENG); L 2–3	Kent (CAN); W 3–0	Bakar (MAS); W 3–0	2 Q	Wilson (ENG); L 1–3	Cogill (RSA); W 3–2	3rd place, bronze medalist(s)

== Triathlon ==
Team Wales announced its squad of 4 triathletes (2 men and 2 women) on 24 January 2018.

Individual

Athlete	Event	Swim (750 m)	Trans 1	Bike (20 km)	Trans 2	Run (5 km)	Total	Rank
Non Stanford	Women's	9:50	0:37	30:09	0:30	17:39	58:45	8

Mixed Relay

Athletes	Event	Total Times per Athlete (Swim 250 m, Bike 7 km, Run 1.5 km)	Total Group Time	Rank
Non Stanford; Iestyn Harrett; Olivia Mathias; Chris Silver	Mixed relay	20:14; 19:04; 21:56; 19:38	1:20:52	6

== Weightlifting ==
Team Wales announced its squad of 16 weightlifters and powerlifters (8 men and 8 women) in three tranches.

Twelve weightlifters were selected on 6 December 2017. Three powerlifters were selected on 20 December 2017 and a final weightlifter was added on 22 December 2017.

Men

Athlete	Event	Snatch		Clean & Jerk		Total	Rank
Athlete	Event	Result	Rank	Result	Rank	Total	Rank
Seth Casidsid	−56 kg	80	9	106	9	186	9
Gareth Evans	−69 kg	136	2	163	2	299	1st place, gold medalist(s)
Harry Misangyi	−85 kg	115	14	−		DNF	
Joshua Parry	−94 kg	125	12	−		DNF	
Jordan Sakkas	−105 kg	140	8	180	7	320	7
Rhodri West	+105 kg	135	10	170	10	305	10

Women

Athlete	Event	Snatch		Clean & Jerk		Total	Rank
Athlete	Event	Result	Rank	Result	Rank	Total	Rank
Hannah Powell	−48 kg	56	11	72	10	128	10
Catrin Jones	−53 kg	72	11	93	8	165	11
Christie Williams	−58 kg	75	7	95	6	170	7
Holly Knowles	−63 kg	73	10	93	8	166	9
Faye Pittman	−69 kg	78	10	100	8	178	10
Laura Hughes	−75 kg	91	3	116	3	207	3rd place, bronze medalist(s)
Tayla Howe	−90 kg	92	5	115	6	207	6

=== Powerlifting ===
Wales participated with 3 athletes (2 men and 1 woman).

Athlete	Event	Result	Rank
Nathan Stephens	Men's lightweight	137.2	10
Sean Gaffney	Men's heavyweight	−	
Nerys Pearce	Women's heavyweight	70.7	4

== Wrestling ==
Team Wales announced its squad of 2 wrestlers (both men) on 24 January 2018.

Athlete	Event	Round of 16	Quarterfinal	Semifinal	Repechage	Final / BM	
Athlete	Event	Opposition Result	Opposition Result	Opposition Result	Opposition Result	Opposition Result	Rank
Kane Charig	Men's freestyle -65 kg	Bye	Bowling (ENG); W 10–0	Bandou (MRI); W 10–0	Bye	Bajrang (IND); L 0–10	2nd place, silver medalist(s)
Curtis Dodge	Men's freestyle -74 kg	Fernando (SRI); W 6–0	Botha (RSA); L 0–10	Did not advance	Salam (SLE); W 6–4	Assizecourt (NGR); W 9–6	3rd place, bronze medalist(s)
