= Kyriakides =

Kyriakides is a surname. Notable people with the surname include:

- Anastasios "Takis" Kyriakides (born 1946), Greek-American businessman and inventor
- Charalambos Kyriakides (born 1998), Cypriot footballer
- Daniel Kyriakides (born 1995), Welsh field hockey player
- James Kyriakides (born 1991), Welsh field hockey player
- Stella Kyriakides (born 1956), Cypriot psychologist and politician
- Stylianos Kyriakides (1910–1987), Cypriot marathon runner
- Yannis Kyriakides (born 1969), Cypriot composer
