= Howard Williams (field hockey) =

British field hockey player

Personal information
- Born: Wales

Sport
- Sport: Field hockey
- Position: Midfield
Senior career
Years	Team	Caps	Goals
1979–1987	Cardiff	-	-
National team
Years	Team	Caps	Goals
–	Great Britain		-
Medal record
Field hockey
Representing Great Britain
Champions Trophy
Bronze medal – third place	1978 Lahore	Team competition

Howard D. Williams was a former British and Welsh hockey international. He was selected for the 1980 Summer Olympics.

== Biography ==
Williams played club hockey for Swansea and Cardiff Hockey Club.

Williams was part of the bronze medal winning Great Britain team that competed at the inaugural 1978 Men's Hockey Champions Trophy, in Lahore, Pakistan.

He went to his second Champions Trophy in 1980 and was selected for the Great Britain team for the 1980 Olympic Games in Moscow, but subsequently did not attend due to the boycott.

Williams had made 33 appearances for Wales by the time he made his indoor debut in 1983.
