= Peter Mills (field hockey) =

British hockey player

Personal information
- Born: 25 August 1945 (age 80)
- Height: 190 cm (6 ft 3 in)
- Weight: 101 kg (223 lb)

Sport
- Sport: Field hockey
- Position: Goalkeeper
Senior career
Years	Team	Caps	Goals
1966–1973	Wimbledon	-	-
1973–1976	Cardiff	-	-
National team
Years	Team	Caps	Goals
–	Great Britain		-
–	England		-

Peter Aubrey Mills (born 25 August 1945) is a British field hockey player. He competed in the men's tournament at the 1972 Summer Olympics.

== Biography ==
Mills played club hockey for Wimbledon Hockey Club in the Men's England Hockey League and represented England at U23 level and Middlesex at county level.

While at Wimbledon, he went to the 1972 Olympics and represented England at the 1973 Men's Hockey World Cup in Amstelveen.

Mills left Wimbledon for Cardiff Hockey Club for the 1973/1974 season and was selected by England again for the 1975 Men's Hockey World Cup in Kuala Lumpur.
