= Alf Dinnie =

Welsh field hockey player

Personal information
- Born: 1 December 1994 (age 31) Devon, England

Sport
- Sport: Field hockey
- Position: Midfield
Senior career
Years	Team	Caps	Goals
2013–2026	Cardiff & Met	-	-
National team
Years	Team	Caps	Goals
2017–	Wales	65	-
Medal record
Representing Wales
European Championship II
Gold medal – first place	2025 Lousada	Team

Alf Bradley Dinnie (born 1 December 1994) is an English born, Welsh field hockey player who has represented Wales. He competed for Wales at two Commonwealth Games.

== Biography ==
Dinnie was educated in South Dartmoor Community College in Devon and studied Sport and Exercise Science at Cardiff Metropolitan University.

While at the university he played club hockey for Cardiff & Met Hockey Club in the Men's England Hockey League and made his Welsh debut against France in 2017. In 2018 he was selected to represent the Welsh team at the 2018 Commonwealth Games in Gold Coast, Australia.

Four years later, he was selected to represent Wales again at the 2022 Commonwealth Games in Birmingham, helping his nation to a sixth-place finish during the men's tournament after being defeated by New Zealand in the fifth place play off match on 7 August 2022.

In 2023, Dinnie helped Wales qualify for their first World Cup in 2023. In 2025, he helped Wales win the gold medal at the European Championship II, defeating Ireland in the final.

Dinnie is a lecturer in performance analysis at Cardiff Metropolitan University in their Cardiff School of Sport & Health Sciences department.
