= Rhodri Furlong =

Welsh field hockey player

Personal information
- Born: 18 October 1995 (age 30)

Sport
- Sport: Field hockey
- Position: Midfielder
Senior career
Years	Team	Caps	Goals
–	Cambridge Nomads	-	-
2019–2022	Hampstead & Westminster	-	-
2022–2024	Holcombe	-	-
2024–2026	Cardiff & Met	-	-
National team
Years	Team	Caps	Goals
2015–	Wales	90	-

Rhodri Furlong (born 18 October 1995) is a Welsh field hockey player who has represented Wales. His brother is Gareth Furlong.

== Biography ==
Furlong was educated at Impington Village College and Long Road Sixth Form College, where he captained the Welsh U18s. and studied Sports and Exercise Science at University of Birmingham from 2014 to 2018 and then Clinical Science at the Newcastle University from 2018 to 2021.

He made his Welsh debut against Scotland on 19 June 2015 and played club hockey for Hampstead & Westminster Hockey Club in the Men's England Hockey League from 2019 to 2022 and while at the club participated in both the 2019 Men's EuroHockey Championship and the 2021 Men's EuroHockey Championship. He then joined Holcombe Hockey Club for the start of the 2022–23 Men's England Hockey League season.

He was part of the Welsh team at the 2023 World Cup, which was the first time in their history that Wales had appeared in the world Cup. Additionally he was part of the Welsh team that played at the 2023 Men's EuroHockey Championship.

After spending two seasons with Holcombe he left the club to return to Wales, working at Morriston Hospital, where he is a Clinical Vascular Scientist. He subsequently also played his club hockey in Wales, signing for Cardiff & Met Hockey Club.
