= Rhys Gowman =

Welsh field hockey player

Personal information
- Born: 10 December 1991 (age 34) Cardiff, Wales

Sport
- Sport: Field hockey
- Position: Forward
Senior career
Years	Team	Caps	Goals
2010–2014	Sheffield	-	-
2014–2026	Cardiff & Met	-	-
National team
Years	Team	Caps	Goals
2010–2025	Wales	49	-

Rhys Wynn Gowman (born 10 December 1991) is a Welsh field hockey player who has represented Wales. He competed for Wales at two Commonwealth Games.

== Biography ==
Gowman, born in Cardiff, studied Sport Coaching at Sheffield Hallam University and played club hockey for Sheffield Hockey Club in the Men's England Hockey League. While playing for Sheffield he was selected to represent the Welsh team at the 2014 Commonwealth Games in Glasgow.

He left Sheffield to sign for Cardiff & Met Hockey Club and undertook more studying; Sport Science and Physiotherapy at the University of South Wales and University of the West of England respectively.

In 2018 he was selected to represent the Welsh team at the 2018 Commonwealth Games in Gold Coast, Australia.
