= Ioan Wall =

Welsh field hockey player

Personal information
- Born: 28 April 1999 (age 27) Wales

Sport
- Sport: Field hockey
- Position: Defender
Senior career
Years	Team	Caps	Goals
–	Swansea	-	-
2020–2026	Cardiff & Met	-	-
National team
Years	Team	Caps	Goals
2016–	Wales		-

Ioan Wall (born 28 April 1999) is a Welsh field hockey player who has represented Wales. He competed for Wales at the 2022 Commonwealth Games.

== Biography ==
Wall studied at Swansea University, where he was a sports scholar.

Wall represented Wales at various aged levels including U16, U18 and U21. Aged just 16 he made his full senior debut for Wales against Poland in 2016. He won the 2019 Sultan of Johar Cup with the Great Britain U23 team.

He played club hockey for Swansea Hockey Club before joining Cardiff & Met in the Men's England Hockey League.

Additionally he was part of the Welsh team that played at the 2021 Men's EuroHockey Championship.

Wall was selected to represent Wales at the 2022 Commonwealth Games in Birmingham, helping his nation to a sixth place finish during the men's tournament after being defeated by New Zealand in the fifth place play off match on 7 August 2022.

He was part of the Welsh team at the 2023 World Cup, which was the first time in their history that Wales had appeared in the world Cup.
