= Luke Hawker =

Welsh field hockey player

Personal information
- Born: 29 January 1989 (age 37) Yeovil, England

Sport
- Sport: Field hockey
- Position: Forward
Senior career
Years	Team	Caps	Goals
–2009	Yeovil & Sherborne	-	-
2009–2025	Cardiff & Met	-	-
National team
Years	Team	Caps	Goals
2012–2024	Wales	136	-

Luke William Hawker (born 29 December 1989) is a Welsh field hockey player who has represented Wales. He competed for Wales and was co-captain of the hockey team at two Commonwealth Games.

== Biography ==
Hawker played club hockey for Yeovil & Sherborne Hockey Club in the Men's England Hockey League before joining Cardiff & Met in 2009. He made his Welsh debut against Poland in 2012.

In 2018 he was selected to represent the Welsh team at the 2018 Commonwealth Games in Gold Coast, Australia. Four years later, Hawker was selected to represent Wales at the 2022 Commonwealth Games in Birmingham, helping his nation to a sixth-place finish during the men's tournament after being defeated by New Zealand in the fifth place play off match on 7 August 2022.

He was part of the Welsh team at the 2023 World Cup, which was the first time in their history that Wales had appeared in the world Cup. Additionally he was part of the Welsh team that played at the 2023 Men's EuroHockey Championship.

In February 2024, he announced his retirement from international hockey.

He works at the Cardiff School of Sport, where he is a senior lecturer at Sport Coaching.
