= James Fortnam =

Welsh field hockey player

Personal information
- Born: 18 May 1990 (age 36) Hereford, England

Sport
- Sport: Field hockey
- Position: Goalkeeper
Senior career
Years	Team	Caps	Goals
2005	Leominster	-	-
2009–2022	Cardiff & Met	-	-
National team
Years	Team	Caps	Goals
2016–2022	Wales	46	-

James Henry Fortnam (born 18 May 1990) is a Welsh former field hockey player who has represented Wales. He competed for Wales at the 2018 Commonwealth Games.

== Biography ==
Fortnam, born in Hereford, was educated at John Masefield High School and Hereford Sixth Form College and studied Sports and Exercise Science at Cardiff Metropolitan University. While at the university he played as the goalkeeper for Cardiff & Met Hockey Club in the Men's England Hockey League and coached goalkeeping at the university. In 2011, he suffered a serious broken leg injury.

In 2018 he was selected to represent the Welsh team at the 2018 Commonwealth Games in Gold Coast, Australia. Fortnam also participated at both the 2019 Men's EuroHockey Championship and 2021 Men's EuroHockey Championship.

In 2021, Fortnam married fellow hockey international Natasha Marke-Jones and both announced their international retirements during 2022.
