= Stephen Kelly (field hockey) =

Welsh field hockey player

Steve Kelly
Personal information
- Born: 12 May 1992 (age 34) Swansea, Wales

Sport
- Sport: Field hockey
- Position: Defender
Senior career
Years	Team	Caps	Goals
–	Cirencester	-	-
2011–2014	Oxford Hawks	-	-
2014–2016	Surbiton	-	-
2017–2025	Hampstead & Westminster	-	-
National team
Years	Team	Caps	Goals
2014–	Wales		-

Stephen John Kelly (born 12 May 1992) is a Welsh field hockey player who has represented Wales. He competed for Wales at two Commonwealth Games.

== Biography ==
Kelly was educated at The King's School, Gloucester and studied at Oxford Brookes University. While at Oxford Brookes, he played club hockey for Oxford Hawks in the Men's England Hockey League. He made his Welsh debut against Austria in 2014 and scored a goal on debut.

He played for Surbiton Hockey Club before joining Hampstead & Westminster Hockey Club and in 2018 he was selected to represent the Welsh team at the 2018 Commonwealth Games in Gold Coast, Australia.

Four years later, Kelly was selected to represent Wales again at the 2022 Commonwealth Games in Birmingham, helping his nation to a sixth-place finish during the men's tournament after being defeated by New Zealand in the fifth place play off match on 7 August 2022.

He was part of the Welsh team at the 2023 World Cup, which was the first time in their history that Wales had appeared in the world Cup. Additionally he was part of the Welsh team that played at the 2023 Men's EuroHockey Championship.
