= Michael Bremner =

Scottish field hockey player

Personal information
- Born: 22 March 1992 (age 34) Paisley, Renfrewshire, Scotland

Sport
- Sport: Field hockey
- Position: Midfielder
Senior career
Years	Team	Caps	Goals
2010–2016	Kelburne	-	-
2017–2023	Hamburg	-	-
National team
Years	Team	Caps	Goals
2010–2022	Scotland	132	(4)
Medal record
Representing Scotland
European Championship II
Bronze medal – third place	2011 Vinnytsia	Team
Bronze medal – third place	2015 Prague	Team
Gold medal – first place	2017 Glasgow	Team
Silver medal – second place	2021 Gniezno	Team

Michael Bremner (born 22 March 1992) is a Scottish field hockey player who represented the Scottish national team at three Commonwealth Games.

== Biography ==
Bremner was born in Paisley, Renfrewshire and educated at Kilbarchan Primary and Johnstone High School.

He played club hockey for Kelburne Hockey Club in the Scottish National Leagues system, winning the league title eight times with the club.

He made his debut for Scotland in 2010 and won a bronze medal with the team at the 2011 Men's EuroHockey Championship II in Vinnytsia, Ukraine.

Bremner represented Scotland at the 2014 Commonwealth Games in Glasgow, in the men's tournament and four years later represented Scotland at the 2018 Commonwealth Games in Gold Coast, Australia, in the men's tournament. In between he won a bronze medal with Scotland at the 2015 Men's EuroHockey Championship II in Prague and won a gold medal with Scotland at the 2017 Men's EuroHockey Championship II in Glasgow.

He played for Scotland at the 2019 Men's EuroHockey Championship. and that same year, won his 100th cap for Scotland against Ireland.

In 2021 he helped Scotland win the silver medal at the 2021 Men's EuroHockey Championship II in Gniezno, Poland and in 2022 he went to his third Commonwealth Games after being selected to represent Scotland at the 2022 Commonwealth Games in Birmingham, England, in the men's tournament.

In December 2022 he announced his retirement from international hockey after his 132nd cap against Switzerland, a match where he also acted as his nation's captain.
