= Hywel Jones (field hockey) =

Welsh field hockey player (born 1997)

Personal information
- Born: 9 July 1997 (age 29) Wales

Sport
- Sport: Field hockey
- Position: Defender
Senior career
Years	Team	Caps	Goals
–2016	Team Bath	-	-
2016–2019	Birmingham Univ	-	-
2019–2022	Hampstead & Westminster	-	-
2022–2023	Harvestehuder THC	-	-
2024–2026	Hampstead & Westminster	-	-
National team
Years	Team	Caps	Goals
2018–	Wales	78	-
Medal record
Representing Wales
European Championship II
Gold medal – first place	2025 Lousada	Team

Hywel Jones (born 9 July 1997) is a Welsh field hockey player who has represented Wales. He competed for Wales at two Commonwealth Games.

== Biography ==
Jones studied Business Management at University of Birmingham. While playing for the University of Birmingham Hockey Club, he made his Welsh debut in a test series against Spain in 2018 and was selected to represent the Welsh team at the 2018 Commonwealth Games in Gold Coast, Australia.

He joined Hampstead & Westminster Hockey Club in the Men's England Hockey League for the 2019–20 season.

Jones was selected to represent Wales at the 2022 Commonwealth Games in Birmingham, helping his nation to a sixth place finish during the men's tournament after being defeated by New Zealand in the fifth place play off match on 7 August 2022.

After the Games he spent a year in the German leagues with Harvestehuder THC before returning to Hampstead & Westminster. He was part of the Welsh team at the 2023 World Cup, which was the first time in their history that Wales had appeared in the world Cup. Additionally he was part of the Welsh team that played at the 2023 Men's EuroHockey Championship.

In 2025, he helped Wales win the gold medal at the European Championship II, defeating Ireland in the final.
