= Hampstead & Westminster Hockey Club =

English field hockey club

- Full name: Hampstead & Westminster Hockey Club
- League: Men's England Hockey League; Women's England Hockey League; London Hockey League; South Hockey League
- Founded: 1894
- Home ground: Paddington Recreation Ground; Maida Vale; London

Personnel
- Captain: Rupert Shipperley (Men's 1st Team); Annebeth Wijtenburg (Women's 1st Team)
- Coach: Kwan Browne (Men's 1st Team); Kate Richardson-Walsh and Sarah Kelleher (Women's 1st Team)
- Manager: Will Packer (Men's 1st Team); Anna Johnson (Women's 1st Team)
- Website: www.hwhc.co.uk

Hampstead & Westminster Hockey Club is a field hockey club based in London, England. It was established in 1894. The home ground is at Paddington Recreation Ground, Maida Vale.

The Men's First, and Second, Team plays in the Men's England Hockey League and the Women's First Team play in the Women's England Hockey League. The rest of the men's teams play in the Higgins Group London Hockey League. The women's teams play in the South Hockey League and the Middlesex Women's League.

The club is possibly one of the largest adult hockey clubs in the UK fielding 12 Men's teams and 7 Ladies' sides, as well as various other mixed, junior and veterans sides.

== History ==
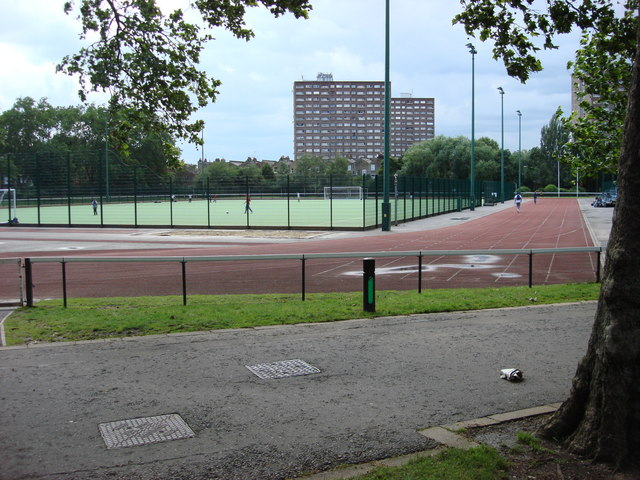
The pitch in 2007

The men's team have been champions of England on one season (2018–19).

In 2013/14 the Ladies finished runners up in the Investec Women's Cup, losing to Investec Premier Division side, Surbiton Hockey Club. The 2014/15 season saw the ladies gain promotion from South Clubs' Women's Hockey League Division 1 into the England Hockey National League under coach Steve Menzies, a club first

During September 2015, the Ladies 1st XI made their debut in the Investec Conference East Division. Coached by, Mo Rahman, supported by Assistant Coach Richard Smith, Manager Jo Edmonson and Captain Annebeth Wijtenburg the girls finished 4th in their first season.

In 2016–17, the Men's 1st XI finished fourth in the England Hockey League, qualifying for the League Finals weekend for the first time in their history, ultimately finishing in 4th place overall. In 2017–18, the Men's 1st XI finished fourth in the Men's England Hockey League once again, reaching the League Finals weekend and narrowly losing the final to Surbiton Hockey Club on penalties. The Ladies' 1st XI won the Women's England Hockey League East Conference and narrowly missed out on promotion to the Premier Division.

In July 2018 it was announced that Kate Richardson-Walsh and Sarah Kelleher would take over from Mike Delaney as the Ladies' 1st XI coaches for the 2018–19 Women's England Hockey League season

On Sunday 14 April 2019, the Men's 1st XI won the Men's England Hockey League for the first time in their 125-year history, beating Surbiton Hockey Club 3–1 in the National Final. On the same day, the Ladies' 1st XI were also promoted to the Women's England Hockey League Premier Division for the first time in their history after wins against Loughborough Students and Stourport Hockey Club.

== Honours ==
=== Major national honours ===
- 2009–10 Men's National Cup Runner Up
- 2011–12 Men's National Cup Runner Up
- 2012–13 Men's National Cup Runner Up
- 2013–14 Women's National Cup Runner Up
- 2018–19 Men's League champions
- 2018–19 Women's National Cup Runner Up

=== Age group honours ===
- 2018 Men's National Over 30s Cup Winner (Zak Hond)
- 2018 Men's National Over 40s Cup Winner
- 2020–21 England Hockey Men's Over 40s Championships Runner-Up

== First team squads (2025–2026) ==
=== Men ===
- 1. Aidan Mylroi (goalkeeper)
- 3. Kevin O'Dea
- 4. Damon Steffens
- 5. James Oates
- 6. Luke Madeley
- 7. Timothy Cross
- 8. Tom Crowson
- 9. Rupert Shipperley (captain)
- 10. Ted Graves
- 11. Rhys Bradshaw
- 12. Sam French
- 13. Matthew Guise-Brown
- 14. Hywel Jones
- 15. Jolyon Morgan
- 17. Toby Vaughan
- 20. Jared Panchia
- 21. Lekan Ogunlana (goalkeeper)
- 22. Michael Robson
- 23. Nicholas Steffens
- 24. Archie Foster
- 25. Karan Sofat
- 26. Matt Richards
- 29. Robbie Gleeson
- 42. Jake Glew

=== Women ===
- 1. Miriam Pritchard (goalkeeper)
- 3. Rachel Greenwood
- 5. Olivia Hamilton
- 8. Phoebe Willars
- 10. Tyler Lench
- 11. Jane Kilpatrick
- 14. Sofia Martin
- 15. Catherine De Ledesma
- 16. Philippa Lewis
- 17. Eve Pearson
- 19. Emily Rowlands
- 22. Joie Leigh
- 24. Holly Hunt
- 25. Lucy Hyams
- 29. Esme Burge (captain)
- 30. Lauren Hunt
- 48. Drew Victoria (goalkeeper)
- 29. Caoimhe Byrne
- 67. Gabriella Giles

== Notable players ==
=== Men's internationals ===
Extended content

Player	Events/Notes	Ref
(England) Richard Alexander	2014–2017	
(England) John Bennett	Oly (1920)	
(Trinidad and Tobago) Kwandwane Browne		
(England) Will Calnan	CG (2022), WC (2018, 2023), EC (2023)	
(Republic of Ireland) Chris Cargo	WC (2018)	
(South Africa) Stephen Cant		
(Wales) Andrew Cornick		
(Australia) / (Republic of Ireland) Tim Cross	Oly (2024)	
(England) Jim Deegan	Oly (1964), Hampstead HC	
(Wales) Jacob Draper	Oly (2020), EC (2023)	
(England) Dan Fox	Oly (2012), WC (2010)	
(Wales) Rhodri Furlong	EC (2019, 2021)	
(England) Harry Gibson		
(Wales) Jonny Gooch	CG (2018), EC (2019)	
(South Africa) Matthew Guise-Brown	Oly (2020, 2024)	
(New Zealand) Andy Hayward		
(Wales) Dale Hutchinson	EC (2023, 2025)	
(Canada) David Jameson		
(England) Michael Johnson		
(Wales) Hywel Jones	CG (2018, 2022), EC (2023, 2025)	
(Wales) Stephen Kelly	CG (2018, 2022), EC (2023)	
(Wales) Daniel Kyriakides	CG (2022)	
(England) Gerald Logan	Oly (1908), Hampstead HC	
(Republic of Ireland) Stuart Loughrey		
(England) Iain Mackay		
(England) Sholto Marcon	1927, Hampstead HC	
(England) Harry Martin	Oly (2020), CG (2018), WC (2018)	
(Wales) Jolyon Morgan	EC (2023, 2025)	
(England) James Oates	EC (2023)	
(New Zealand) Mitesh Patel		
(Wales) Toby Reynolds-Cotterill	CG (2022), WC (2023), EC (2023, 2025)	
(Wales) Dewi Roblin	CG (2022), EC (2023)	
(Wales) Rupert Shipperley	Oly (2020, 2024), CG (2018, 2022), EC (2023, 2025)	
(England) Stanley Shoveller	Oly (1908, 1920), Hampstead HC	
(England) Soma Singh		
(England) Richard Smith		
(Wales) Peter Swainson	2009–2010	
(England) Nick Thompson		
(New Zealand) Simon Towns		
(Brazil) Stephane Vehrle-Smith	Oly (2016)	
(England) Luther Vye	Oly (1956), Hampstead HC	
(Republic of Ireland) Michael Watt	Oly (2016)	
(Australia) Scott Webster		
(England) Cyril Wilkinson	Oly (1920)	

Key

- Oly = Olympic Games
- CG = Commonwealth Games
- WC = World Cup
- CT = Champions Trophy
- EC = European Championships

=== Women's internationals ===
Extended content

Player	Events	Notes/Ref
(England) Grace Balsdon		
(England) Holly Hunt		
(Scotland) Emily Maguire		
(England) Lily Owsley		
(Scotland) Sarah Robertson		
(England) Nicola White		

Key

- Oly = Olympic Games
- CG = Commonwealth Games
- WC = World Cup
- CT = Champions Trophy
- EC = European Championships
