= Wimbledon Hockey Club =

English field hockey team

- Full name: Wimbledon Hockey Club
- League: Men's England Hockey League; Women's England Hockey League
- Founded: 1883; 143 years ago
- Home ground: Raynes Park High School

Wimbledon Hockey Club is a professional field hockey club based in Wimbledon, London, England. It was established in 1883 and fields nine men's sides, seven ladies' sides as well as a comprehensive junior section. The men's 1st XI play in the Men's England Hockey League and the ladies 1st XI play in the Women's England Hockey League.

The club's home ground is a water based AstroTurf located at Raynes Park High School, which was built in conjunction with the school in 2019. Its clubhouse is that of the multi-sports club 'The Wimbledon Club' on Church Road, Wimbledon.

The men's team have been champions of England on two occasions (2014–15 and 2015–16). And they also competed in the Euro Hockey League several times. They reached the semi finals of this tournament in 2017.

== Players ==
=== Men's 1st Team Squad 2025–26 season ===
- 1 Toby Reynolds-Cotterill (goalkeeper)
- 2. Freddie Britt
- 3. Alex Sheldon
- 5. Jack Turner
- 7. Duncan Scott
- 9. Eddie Harper
- 10. Rory Patterson
- 12. Jules Bournac
- 13. Eddie Way
- 14. Louis Tipper
- 15. Sam Hooper (captain)
- 16. James Vallely
- 17. Ben Fox
- 18. Euan Gilmour
- 19. Benjamin Francis
- 21. Liam Ansell
- 23. Jonathan Lankfer
- 25. Kei Käppeler
- 26. Zach Mason
- 32. Callum Mackenzie

=== Women's 1st Team Squad 2025–26 season ===
- 4. Hannah Bond
- 5. Pippa Lock
- 6. Anna Toman (captain)
- 7. Hannah Martin
- 8. Olivia Chilton
- 9. Sarah Jones
- 10. Becky Manton
- 11. Suzy Petty
- 12. Charlotte Watson
- 13. Flora Fletcher
- 14. Emily Drysdale
- 15. Beth Bingham
- 17. Lydia Macdonell
- 19. Maddie Peel
- 20. Sarah Robertson
- 21. Fiona Crackles
- 23. Jessica Buchanan (goalkeeper)
- 24. Millie Holme
- 26. Molly Fairbairn
- 28. Flora Peel
- 30. Paige Gillott

== Men's Major National Honours ==
National champions

- 2014–15 Men's League Champions
- 2015–16 Men's League Champions

== Notable players ==
=== Men's internationals ===
Extended content

Player	Events/Notes	Ref
(England) Richard Alexander		
(England) Liam Ansell	Oly (2020), CG (2022), WC (2023)	
(England) James Bailey	Oly (2016)	
(Wales) Rhys Bradshaw	EC (2023, 2025)	
(England) Alastair Brogdon	Oly (2016), CG (2014), WC (2014)	
(South Africa) Matt Brown		
(England) David Condon	CG (2022), WC (2023)	
(England) Ben Fox	EC (2025)	
(Wales) Benjamin Francis	CG (2022), EC (2023, 2025)	
(Wales) Dominic Graham		
(England) Ben Hawes	Oly (2012)	
(England) Michael Hoare	Oly (2016), CG (2014), WC (2014, 2018)	
(England) Sam Hooper	EC (2025)	
(Republic of Ireland) Iain Lewers		
(Scotland) Callum Mackenzie	CG (2022), EC (2023, 2025)	
(England) George McGrath	Oly (1920)	
(Scotland) Gordon McIntyre	CG (2018)	
(England) Simon Mantell		
(England) Ben Marsden		
(England) Peter Mills	Oly (1972), WC (1973)	
(England) Rob Moore		
(Wales) Fred Newbold	EC (2025)	
(England) Phil Roper	Oly (2020), CG (2014, 2018), WC (2018)	
(England) Peter Scott		
(Republic of Ireland) Ian Sloan	Oly (2016, 2020), CG (2018), WC (2018)	
(England) Rhys Smith		
(Wales) Owen Sutton	EC (2025)	
(Wales) Peter Swainson	2010–2012	
(South Africa) Dylan Swanepoel		
(England) Jack Turner		
(England) Jack Waller	(Oly 2020, 2024), CG (2022), WC (2018, 2023), EC (2023)	
(England) Henry Weir	Oly (2016), CG (2014, 2018), WC (2014)	
(England) Duncan Woods		

Key

- Oly = Olympic Games
- CG = Commonwealth Games
- WC = World Cup
- CT = Champions Trophy
- EC = European Championships

=== Women's internationals ===
Extended content

Player	Events/Notes	Ref
(England) Fiona Crackles		
(England) Crista Cullen		
(England) Flora Peel		
(England) Hollie Pearne-Webb		
(England) Suzy Petty		
(Wales) Rose Thomas		
(England) Anna Toman		

Key

- Oly = Olympic Games
- CG = Commonwealth Games
- WC = World Cup
- CT = Champions Trophy
- EC = European Championships
