= Dale Hutchinson =

Welsh field hockey player (born 1993)

Personal information
- Born: 23 October 1993 (age 32) Cardiff, Wales

Sport
- Sport: Field hockey
- Position: Midfield
Senior career
Years	Team	Caps	Goals
2012–2015	Cardiff & Met	-	-
2016–2017	BH&BC Breda	-	-
2017–2018	Reading	-	-
2018–2020	HC Tilburg	-	-
2020–2022	Cardiff & Met	-	-
2023–2025	Hampstead & Westminster	-	-
2025–2026	Cardiff & Met	-	-
National team
Years	Team	Caps	Goals
2014–	Wales	123	-
Medal record
Representing Wales
European Championship II
Gold medal – first place	2025 Lousada	Team

Dale Hutchinson (born 23 October 1993) is a Welsh field hockey player who has represented Wales. He competed for Wales at two Commonwealth Games.

== Biography ==
Hutchinson was born in Cardiff, educated at Fitzalan High School and studied at Cardiff Metropolitan University, where he played for the Cardiff & Met Hockey Club.

While at Cardiff he made his Welsh debut against Spain in 2014. He spent a season playing professionally for BH&BC Breda before returning to the UK and signing on for Reading Hockey Club in the Men's England Hockey League for the 2017–18 season.

In 2018 he was selected to represent the Welsh team at the 2018 Commonwealth Games in Gold Coast, Australia. After the Games, he returned to the Netherlands, spending two seasons with HC Tilburg before a second spell at Cardiff & Met.

He was selected to represent Wales at the 2022 Commonwealth Games in Birmingham, helping his nation to a sixth place finish during the men's tournament after being defeated by New Zealand in the fifth place play off match on 7 August 2022.

After signing for Hampstead & Westminster Hockey Club, he was part of the Welsh team that played at the 2023 Men's EuroHockey Championship.

In 2025, he helped Wales win the gold medal at the European Championship II, defeating Ireland in the final. He moved back to Cardiff for the 2025–26 season.
