= James Kyriakides =

Welsh field hockey player

Personal information
- Born: 20 March 1991 (age 35) Swansea, Wales

Sport
- Sport: Field hockey
- Position: Defender
Senior career
Years	Team	Caps	Goals
2013–2014	Olton	-	-
2016–2017	Cardiff & Met	-	-
2017–2018	Southgate	-	-
2018–2019	Cardiff & Met	-	-
2019–2024	Three Rock	-	-
National team
Years	Team	Caps	Goals
–	Wales		-
–	GB		-

James Michael Andreas Kyriakides (born 20 March 1991) is a Welsh field hockey player. He is the older brother of Daniel Kyriakides.

== Biography ==
Kyriakides was educated at Olchfa School, Swansea and studied at Nottingham Trent University. He played club hockey for Olton & West Warwickshire Hockey Club and represented Wales in the 2014 Commonwealth Games in Glasgow.

Kyriakides switched to Cardiff & Met from Swansea and was selected to represent Wales at the 2018 Commonwealth Games in Gold Coast.

For the 2017/18 season, he played club hockey for Southgate Hockey Club in the Men's England Hockey League before returning to Cardiff & Met. For the 2019/20 season he moved to Ireland to play for Three Rock Rovers Hockey Club.
