= Liam Ansell =

English field hockey player (born 1993)

Personal information
- Born: 12 November 1993 (age 33) High Wycombe, England
- Height: 1.74 m (5 ft 9 in)
- Weight: 80 kg (176 lb)

Sport
- Sport: Field hockey
- Position: Forward
Senior career
Years	Team	Caps	Goals
2012-2013	Richmond HC	-	-
2013–2015	Sheffield Hallam	-	-
2015–2016	Den Bosch	-	-
2016–2018	Surbiton	-	-
2018–2020	East Grinstead	-	-
2020–2023	Wimbledon	-	-
2023–2024	Amsterdam	-	-
2024–2026	Wimbledon	-	-
National team
Years	Team	Caps	Goals
2017–present	England & GB	82	(29)
Medal record
Men's field hockey
Representing England
Commonwealth Games
Bronze medal – third place	2018 Gold Coast	Team
Bronze medal – third place	2022 Birmingham	Team

Liam Paul Ansell (born 12 November 1993) is an English field hockey player who plays as a forward for Wimbledon and the England and Great Britain national teams. He competed at the 2020 Summer Olympics.

== Biography ==
Ansell played club hockey for (in order) Wycombe, Richmond, Sheffield Hallam, Dutch Club Den Bosch, Surbiton.

From 2018 to 2020 he played for East Grinstead and represented England at the 2018 Commonwealth Games in Gold Coast.

Ansell joined Wimbledon in the Men's England Hockey League Premier Division from 2020 and while at Wimbledon he was selected to represent Great Britain squad for the delayed 2020 Olympic Games in Tokyo. He also went to his second Commonwealth Games, winning a bronze medal with England in the Men's tournament at the 2022 Commonwealth Games in Birmingham.

For the 2022–23 season he transferred to Amsterdam but after one season he returned to Wimbledon for the 2024–-25 season.
