= Rupert Shipperley =

Welsh field hockey player (born 1992)

Personal information
- Born: 21 November 1992 (age 33) Cwmbran, Wales
- Height: 1.78 m (5 ft 10 in)

Sport
- Sport: Field hockey
- Position: Midfielder / Forward
Senior career
Years	Team	Caps	Goals
–	Whitchurch	-	-
–2014	Cardiff & Met	-	-
2014–2016	Surbiton	-	-
2016–2026	Hampstead & Westminster	-	-
National team
Years	Team	Caps	Goals
2014–	Wales	116	-
2014–	GB	54	-
Medal record
Representing Wales
European Championship II
Gold medal – first place	2025 Lousada	Team

Rupert Scott Shipperley (born 21 November 1992) is a Welsh international field hockey player who plays as a midfielder or forward for Wales and Great Britain. He competed at the 2020 Summer Olympics and 2024 Summer Olympics.

== Biography ==
Shipperley was born in Cwmbran, Wales, and played hockey for Whitchurch, followed by Cardiff & Met before joining Surbiton in the Men's England Hockey League for the 2014 season. Shipperley made his senior debut for Wales on 13 May 2014, in a 0–5 defeat to Spain in Spain.

In 2016, he transferred to Hampstead & Westminster and while at the club played for Wales at Hockey at the 2018 Commonwealth Games in Gold Coast and 2019 Men's EuroHockey Nations Championship, where they finished 6th.

Shipperley was a Geography teacher at King's College School, Wimbledon before he was selected for the Great Britain team that would go to Tokyo for the delayed 2020 Olympic Games.

He represented Wales at the 2022 Commonwealth Games in Birmingham He was part of the Welsh team at the 2023 World Cup, which was the first time in their history that Wales had appeared in the world Cup.

Shipperley was subsequently selected to represent the Great Britain team again at the 2024 Summer Olympics. The team went out in the quarter-finals after losing a penalty shootout to India.

In 2025, he helped Wales win the gold medal at the European Championship II, defeating Ireland in the final.
