= Owain Dolan-Gray =

Welsh field hockey player (born 1990)

Personal information
- Born: 17 December 1990 (age 35) His own house, Wales

Sport
- Sport: Field hockey
- Position: Forward
Senior career
Years	Team	Caps	Goals
2012–2013	Loughborough Students	-	-
2014–2017	Cardiff & Met	-	-
2017–2020	Reading	-	-
2020–2025	Cardiff & Met	-	-
National team
Years	Team	Caps	Goals
2009–2026	Wales	150	-

Owain Ellis Dolan-Gray (born 17 December 1990) is a Welsh field hockey player who has represented Wales. He competed for Wales at three Commonwealth Games in 2014, 2018 and 2022.

== Biography ==
Dolan-Gray made his Welsh debut against Malaysia in 2009. He studied at Loughborough University and played club hockey for Loughborough Students in the Men's England Hockey League. Towards the end of his studies he was selected to represent the Welsh team at the 2014 Commonwealth Games in Glasgow.

He joined Cardiff & Met around the same time and after three years at Cardiff, joined Reading Hockey Club for the 2017–18 season. While at Reading, he took up a coaching role with Wallingford Hockey Club, looking after the men's first and second teams and a second Commonwealth Games appearance ensued in 2018.

He made his 100th appearance for Wales against the United States in 2019 before returning to Cardiff & Met, where he studied part time Sustainability Planning and Environmental Policy.

Dolan-Gray was selected to represent Wales at the 2022 Commonwealth Games in Birmingham, helping his nation to a sixth place finish during the men's tournament after being defeated by New Zealand in the fifth place play off match on 7 August 2022. Additionally he was part of the Welsh team that played at the 2023 Men's EuroHockey Championship.

In 2025, he earned his 150th cap for Wales.
