= Lewis Prosser =

Welsh field hockey player

Personal information
- Born: 17 December 1990 (age 35) Swindon, England

Sport
- Sport: Field hockey
- Position: Midfield
Senior career
Years	Team	Caps	Goals
2008	Marlborough College	-	-
2012–2013	RS Tenis	-	-
2013–2014	Gantoise	-	-
2009–2014	Team Bath	-	-
2014–2019	Surbiton	-	-
2019–2023	East Grinstead	-	-
National team
Years	Team	Caps	Goals
2008–2023	Wales	180	-

Lewis Jon Prosser (born 13 June 1989) is a former Welsh field hockey player who represented Wales. He competed for Wales at three Commonwealth Games in 2014, 2018 and 2022.

== Biography ==
Prosser born in Swindon, represented England at junior level before deciding to switch allegiance to Wales (both parents were Welsh). He made his Welsh debut in 2008.

He studied at University of Bath and the University of the West of England and played club hockey for Team Bath Buccaneers Hockey Club in the Men's England Hockey League. He had spells in Spain and Belgium but was back at Bath when he was selected to represent the Welsh team at the 2014 Commonwealth Games in Glasgow.

After Bath, he joined Surbiton Hockey Club and while there, was selected to represent the Welsh team at the 2018 Commonwealth Games in Gold Coast, Australia. He left Surbiton to play for East Grinstead at the start of the 2019-20 season.

Prosser was selected as co-captain again for Wales at the 2022 Commonwealth Games in Birmingham, helping his nation to a sixth place finish during the men's tournament after being defeated by New Zealand in the fifth place play off match on 7 August 2022.

Prosser was co-captain of the Welsh team at the 2023 World Cup, which was the first time in their history that Wales had appeared in the world Cup.

In June 2023, Prosser announced his retirement from international hockey. At the time of his retirement his 180 caps made him the most capped Welshman of all-time.

== Family ==
His father David Prosser who died in 2021, played 69 times for Wales and 16 times for Great Britain.
