= Jacob Draper =

Welsh field hockey player (born 1998)

Personal information
- Full name: Jacob Benjamin Draper
- Born: 24 July 1998 (age 28) Cwmbran, Wales
- Weight: 74 kg (163 lb)

Sport
- Sport: Field hockey
- Position: Defender
Senior career
Years	Team	Caps	Goals
–	Gwent HC	-	-
–2018	Preston HC	-	-
2018–2019	Cardiff & Met	-	-
2019–2021	Hampstead & Westminster	-	-
2021–2022	Beerschot	-	-
2022–2023	Hampstead & Westminster	-	-
2023–2025	Pinoké	-	-
National team
Years	Team	Caps	Goals
2016–present	Wales	91	-
2016–present	GB	63	-
Medal record
Representing Wales
European Championship II
Gold medal – first place	2025 Lousada	Team

Jacob Benjamin Draper (born 24 July 1998) is a Welsh field hockey player who plays as a defender for Dutch Hoofdklasse club Pinoké and the Wales and Great Britain national teams. He competed at the 2020 Summer Olympics and the 2024 Summer Olympics.

== Biography ==
Draper was born in Cwmbran, Wales, and started his hockey career with Gwent HC. He then played for Preston, followed by Cardiff & Met. While at Preston, Draper made his senior debut, aged 18, for Wales on 28 August 2016, in a 5–1 win over Austria in Vienna, Austria. He played for Wales at Hockey at the 2018 Commonwealth Games in Gold Coast and 2019 Men's EuroHockey Nations Championship, where they finished 6th.

Draper left Cardiff & Met to join Hampstead & Westminster for the 2019/20 season.

Draper was selected to represent Great Britain squad for the delayed 2020 Olympic Games in Tokyo and was selected to represent Wales at the 2022 Commonwealth Games in Birmingham.

He joined Belgian club Beerschot for the 2021–22 season before joining Hampstead & Westminster in the Men's England Hockey League Premier Division for the 2022–23 season. He was part of the Welsh team at the 2023 World Cup, which was the first time in their history that Wales had appeared in the world Cup.

Draper joined Pinoké in the Netherlands and was subsequently selected to represent Great Britain at the 2024 Summer Olympics. The team went out in the quarter-finals after losing a penalty shootout to India.

In 2025, he helped Wales win the gold medal at the European Championship II, defeating Ireland in the final.
