= Cardiff & Met Hockey Club =

Welsh field hockey club

- League: Men's England Hockey League
- Founded: 1896; 129 years ago
- Home ground: Sophia Gardens

Personnel
- Owner: Cardiff Athletic Club
- Website: Official website
Home

Cardiff & Met Hockey Club, previously known as Cardiff & UWIC Hockey Club, is a professional field hockey club based at the Sport Wales National Centre in Sophia Gardens, Cardiff, Wales. They play in the Men's England Hockey League.

It was established in November, 1896 and today forms the hockey section of Cardiff Athletic Club with its headquarters at Cardiff Arms Park. The teams play at the Sport Wales National Centre and Cardiff Metropolitan University. It is one of the oldest sporting organisations in the whole of Wales.

== History ==
An early logo of Cardiff Hockey Club

The club was established in November 1896 as the Roath Hockey Club.

The club was one of the first hockey clubs in Cardiff. The first game was played on 5 December 1898, however within a few months the club had changed its name to Cardiff Hockey Club. The Club moved from its original ground at Roath Park to Llandaff Fields and the Whitchurch Polo Fields.

In 1920 when a ladies hockey club was formed, called Cardiff United. In 1927 the club became part of the Cardiff Athletic Club, and played under the name of Cardiff Athletic Ladies HC until 1939.

In May 1945 the Management Committee of Cardiff Athletic Club decided to form a Hockey Section by inviting the Cardiff Hockey Club to become a section of the Cardiff Athletic Club. Around 2008 the club merged with the University of Wales Institute Cardiff to form the Cardiff & UWIC Hockey Club, which later became the Cardiff Metropolitan University.

The home pitch is based at Sophia Gardens with training facilities at the Cardiff Metropolitan University.

== Men's First Team Squad 2025–26 season ==
- 2. Rhodri Furlong
- 3. Ioan Wall
- 5. Alf Dinnie
- 7. Jonny Fleck
- 8. Daniel Kyriakides
- 10. Rhys Gowman
- 11. Luke Hawker
- 13. Dale Hutchinson
- 15. Owain Dolan-Gray
- 16. James Tyson
- 18. Will Penrose
- 20. William Riley
- 21. Jack Pritchard (captain)
- 22. Scott Rawlings
- 25. Sion Goldsmith
- 27. Hari Bhogal
- 30. Mark Philpot (goalkeeper)
- 32. Liam Barker
- 36. Louie Vian
- 51. Matthew Dicker

== Notable players ==
=== Men's internationals ===
Extended content

Player	Events/Notes	Ref
(Wales) Liam Brignull	CG (2014)	
(Wales) Benjamin Carless	2015–2019	
(Wales) Owain Dolan-Gray	CG (2022), EC (2023)	
(Wales) Alf Dinnie	CG (2018, 2022), EC (2025)	
(Wales) Jacob Draper	CG (2018)	
(Wales) James Fortnam	CG (2018), EC (2019, 2021)	
(Wales) Gareth Furlong	CG (2018)	
(Wales) Rhys Gowman	CG (2018)	
(Wales) Luke Hawker	CG (2018, 2022), EC (2023)	
(Wales) Dale Hutchinson	CG (2022)	
(Wales) Daniel Kyriakides	CG (2014)	
(Scotland) Callum Mackenzie	2019–2021	
(Wales) Peter Mills	WC (1975)	
(Wales) Jolyon Morgan	EC (2021)	
(Wales) Joe Naughalty	2008 debut	
(Wales) Rhys Payne	WC (2023), EC (2025)	
(Wales) Jack Pritchard	WC (2023), EC (2023, 2025)	
(Wales) Bertrand Turnbull	Oly (1908)	
(Wales) Philip Turnbull	Oly (1908)	
(Wales) Ioan Wall	CG (2022), WC (2023), EC (2021)	
(Wales) Bryn Williams	Oly (1980), CT (1980)	
(Wales) Howard Williams	Oly (1980), CT (1978, 1980)	

Key

- Oly = Olympic Games
- CG = Commonwealth Games
- WC = World Cup
- CT = Champions Trophy
- EC = European Championships

== See also ==
- Sport in Cardiff
