= Hockey at the 2022 Commonwealth Games – Men's tournament =

Men's hockey at the 2022 Commonwealth Games
Tournament details
- Host country: England
- City: Birmingham
- Dates: 29 July – 8 August 2022
- Teams: 10 (from 5 confederations)
- Venue(s): University of Birmingham Hockey and Squash Centre

Final positions
- Champions: Australia (7th title)
- Runner-up: India
- Third place: England

Tournament statistics
- Matches played: 27
- Goals scored: 188 (6.96 per match)
- Top scorer(s): (England) Nick Bandurak (11 goals)

The men's field hockey tournament at the 2022 Commonwealth Games was held at the University of Birmingham Hockey and Squash Centre between 29 July and 8 August 2022.

== Qualification ==
England qualified as host nation, Australia qualified as defending champions, and the other teams qualified by FIH Men's World Ranking.

| Means of qualification | Date | Location | Quotas | Qualified |
|---|---|---|---|---|
| Host Nation | — | — | 1 | England |
| 2018 Commonwealth Games | 5–14 April 2018 | (Australia) Gold Coast | 1 | Australia |
| FIH World Rankings | 1 February 2022 | — | 8 | India; New Zealand; ~~Malaysia~~ (Note: The Malaysian Hockey Confederation withdrew from the Commonwealth Games in order to optimise preparation for the 2022 Asian Games, where the winning team will qualify for the 2024 Summer Olympics. At the time, the Asian Games were scheduled to take place in September 2022.); Canada; South Africa; Wales; Pakistan; Scotland; Ghana |
| TOTAL | | | 10 | |

Scheduling issues

== Competition format ==
In March 2022, ten teams were drawn into two groups; the top two performing teams in each group advance to the semi-finals, whilst the remaining teams are sent to lower classification matches to determine their final ranking.

== Umpires ==
- Steve Rogers (AUS)
- Tyler Klenk (CAN)
- Bruce Bale (ENG)
- Dan Barstow (ENG)
- Nick Bennett (ENG)
- Deepak Joshi (IND)
- Peter Kabaso (KEN)
- Ilanggo Kanabathu (MAS)
- Tim Bond (NZL)
- David Tomlinson (NZL)
- Sean Rapaport (RSA)
- Fraser Bell (SCO)

== Group stage ==
=== Pool A ===
| Pos | Team | Pld | W | D | L | GF | GA | GD | Pts | Qualification |
|---|---|---|---|---|---|---|---|---|---|---|
| 1 | Australia | 4 | 4 | 0 | 0 | 29 | 2 | +27 | 12 | Semi-finals |
| 2 | South Africa | 4 | 2 | 1 | 1 | 11 | 12 | −1 | 7 | Semi-finals |
| 3 | New Zealand | 4 | 1 | 1 | 2 | 14 | 17 | −3 | 4 | Fifth place match |
| 4 | Pakistan | 4 | 1 | 1 | 2 | 6 | 15 | −9 | 4 | Seventh place match |
| 5 | Scotland | 4 | 0 | 1 | 3 | 11 | 25 | −14 | 1 | Ninth place match |

Source: Birmingham 2022
Rules for classification: 1) points; 2) number of wins; 3) goal difference; 4) goals scored; 5) head-to-head results.

29 July 2022
21:00

| New Zealand | 5–5 | Scotland |
|---|---|---|
| Russell 26'; Lane 43'; Smith 47'; Inglis 49'; Hiha 51' | Report | Harwood 6'; Mackenzie 17'; J. Golden 20', 28'; C. Golden 24' |

Umpires:
Tyler Klenk (CAN)
Peter Kabaso (KEN)

30 July 2022
09:00

| South Africa | 2–2 | Pakistan |
|---|---|---|
| Beauchamp 14'; Guise-Brown 54' | Report | R. Ali 25'; Hakeem 60' |

Umpires:
Nick Bennett (ENG)
Bruce Bale (ENG)

31 July 2022
09:00

| New Zealand | 4–1 | Pakistan |
|---|---|---|
| Inglis 17', 18'; Thomas 43'; Lane 60' | Report | G. Ali 26' |

Umpires:
Dan Barstow (ENG)
Tyler Klenk (CAN)

31 July 2022
11:00

| Australia | 12–0 | Scotland |
|---|---|---|
| Govers 9'; Brand 13', 32'; Hayward 13', 25', 37', 53'; Wickham 16', 18'; Simmonds 33'; Ephraums 35', 50' | Report |

Umpires:
Deepak Joshi (IND)
Bruce Bale (ENG)

1 August 2022
14:00

| Scotland | 4–5 | South Africa |
|---|---|---|
| McConnell 33'; Forsyth 35'; C. Golden 38'; Walker 43' | Report | D. Cassiem 2'; Spooner 24'; Ntuli 43'; Guise-Brown 56'; Paton 60' |

Umpires:
Nick Bennett (ENG)
Steve Rogers (AUS)

1 August 2022
19:00

| New Zealand | 2–7 | Australia |
|---|---|---|
| Inglis 17'; Smith 44' | Report | Anderson 8'; Govers 22', 24'; Whetton 27'; Ephraums 37'; Zalewski 44', 48' |

Umpires:
Dan Barstow (ENG)
Ilanggo Kanabathu (MAS)

3 August 2022
19:00

| Pakistan | 3–2 | Scotland |
|---|---|---|
| Hakeem 22'; Shahid 23'; Khan 55' | Report | C. Golden 9'; Walker 38' |

Umpires:
Tyler Klenk (CAN)
Sean Rapaport (RSA)

3 August 2022
21:00

| South Africa | 0–3 | Australia |
|---|---|---|
| | Report | Whetton 4'; Zalewski 8'; Govers 55' |

Umpires:
Fraser Bell (SCO)
Bruce Bale (ENG)

4 August 2022
19:00

| South Africa | 4–3 | New Zealand |
|---|---|---|
| Guise-Brown 3', 18'; Horne 7'; Beauchamp 53' | Report | Lane 9'; Smith 39'; Inglis 47' |

Umpires:
Dan Barstow (ENG)
Bruce Bale (ENG)

4 August 2022
21:00

| Australia | 7–0 | Pakistan |
|---|---|---|
| Govers 12'; Hayward 19', 40'; Wickham 42', 48'; Anderson 53'; Ephramus 59' | Report |

Umpires:
Peter Kabaso (KEN)
David Tomlinson (NZL)

=== Pool B ===
| Pos | Team | Pld | W | D | L | GF | GA | GD | Pts | Qualification |
|---|---|---|---|---|---|---|---|---|---|---|
| 1 | India | 4 | 3 | 1 | 0 | 27 | 5 | +22 | 10 | Semi-finals |
| 2 | England (H) | 4 | 3 | 1 | 0 | 25 | 8 | +17 | 10 | Semi-finals |
| 3 | Wales | 4 | 2 | 0 | 2 | 14 | 10 | +4 | 6 | Fifth place match |
| 4 | Canada | 4 | 0 | 1 | 3 | 4 | 25 | −21 | 1 | Seventh place match |
| 5 | Ghana | 4 | 0 | 1 | 3 | 2 | 24 | −22 | 1 | Ninth place match |

Source: Birmingham 2022
Rules for classification: 1) points; 2) number of wins; 3) goal difference; 4) goals scored; 5) head-to-head results.
(H) Hosts

29 July 2022
19:00

| England | 6–0 | Ghana |
|---|---|---|
| Bandurak 8', 30', 45'; Roper 27'; Calnan 39'; Condon 51' | Report |

Umpires:
Tim Bond (NZL)
Ilanggo Kanabathu (MAS)

30 July 2022
11:00

| Canada | 1–5 | Wales |
|---|---|---|
| Sarmento 59' | Report | Furlong 8', 12', 14', 49'; Griffiths 45' |

Umpires:
David Tomlinson (NZL)
Fraser Bell (SCO)

31 July 2022
14:00

| England | 4–2 | Wales |
|---|---|---|
| Ward 2'; Bandurak 41', 57'; Roper 53' | Report | Prosser 19'; Carson 52' |

Umpires:
Steve Rogers (AUS)
Sean Rapaport (RSA)

31 July 2022
16:00

| India | 11–0 | Ghana |
|---|---|---|
| Abhishek 2'; Harmanpreet 10', 36', 54'; Shamsher 14'; Akashdeep 20'; Jugraj 22', 45'; Nilakanta 39'; Varun 40'; Mandeep 48' | Report |

Umpires:
Fraser Bell (SCO)
Tim Bond (NZL)

1 August 2022
16:00

| England | 4–4 | India |
|---|---|---|
| Ansell 42'; Bandurak 47', 53'; Roper 51' | Report | Lalit 3'; Mandeep 13', 22'; Harmanpreet 46' |

Umpires:
David Tomlinson (NZL)
Sean Rapaport (RSA)

1 August 2022
19:00

| Ghana | 1–1 | Canada |
|---|---|---|
| Kwofie 19' | Report | Pereira 60' |

Umpires:
Deepak Joshi (IND)
Peter Kabaso (KEN)

3 August 2022
14:00

| Canada | 0–8 | India |
|---|---|---|
| | Report | Harmanpreet 7', 56'; Amit 10'; Lalit 20'; Gurjant 27'; Akashdeep 37', 60'; Mandeep 58' |

Umpires:
Peter Kabaso (KEN)
Ilanggo Kanabathu (MAS)

3 August 2022
16:00

| Wales | 6–1 | Ghana |
|---|---|---|
| Furlong 26', 38', 44'; Francis 48'; Kyriakides 58'; Dolan-Gray 58' | Report | Kwofie 21' |

Umpires:
Tim Bond (NZL)
Nick Bennett (ENG)

4 August 2022
14:00

| India | 4–1 | Wales |
|---|---|---|
| Harmanpreet 18', 19', 41'; Gurjant 49' | Report | Furlong 55' |

Umpires:
Nick Bennett (ENG)
Tyler Klenk (CAN)

4 August 2022
16:00

| Canada | 2–11 | England |
|---|---|---|
| Guraliuk 11', 56' | Report | Roper 2', 45'; Bandurak 16', 38', 50', 59'; Ansell 19'; Wallace 24', 44'; Rushmere 54'; Ward 55' |

Umpires:
Deepak Joshi (IND)
Steve Rogers (AUS)

== Classification matches ==
=== Ninth place match ===
6 August 2022
09:00

| Scotland | 7–2 | Ghana |
|---|---|---|
| Walker 7'; C. Golden 19'; J. Golden 36', 51'; Harwood 46'; Duke 47'; Morton 53' | Report | Ankomah 33'; Tettey 54' |

Umpires:
Peter Kabaso (KEN)
Ilanggo Kanabathu (MAS)

=== Seventh place match ===
6 August 2022
11:15

| Pakistan | 4–3 | Canada |
|---|---|---|
| Rana 24'; Ali 25'; Umar Bhutta 52'; Shahid 60' | Report | Sarmento 26', 58'; Pereira 30' |

Umpires:
Fraser Bell (SCO)
Tim Bond (NZL)

=== Fifth place match ===
7 August 2022
18:00

| New Zealand | 2–1 | Wales |
|---|---|---|
| Woods 7'; Findlay 41' | Report | Furlong 24' |

Umpires:
Bruce Bale (ENG)
Nick Bennett (ENG)

== Medal round ==
=== Bracket ===
Semi-finals
6 August
Australia | 3
England | 2
6 August
India | 3
South Africa | 2

Gold medal match
8 August
Australia | 7
India | 0
Bronze medal match
8 August
England | 6
South Africa | 3

=== Semi-finals ===
6 August 2022
18:00

| India | 3–2 | South Africa |
|---|---|---|
| Abhishek 20'; Mandeep 28'; Jugraj 58' | Report | Julius 33'; M. Cassiem 59' |

Umpires:
Dan Barstow (ENG)
Steve Rogers (AUS)

6 August 2022
20:15

| Australia | 3–2 | England |
|---|---|---|
| Govers 27'; Anderson 44'; Beale 50' | Report | Roper 12'; Wallace 19' |

Umpires:
Sean Rapaport (RSA)
David Tomlinson (NZL)

=== Bronze medal match ===
8 August 2022
09:00

| England | 6–3 | South Africa |
|---|---|---|
| Smith 19'; Ansell 24'; Ward 25'; Roper 40', 50'; Wallace 59' | Report | Guise-Brown 18'; M. Cassiem 22'; Ntuli 30' |

Umpires:
Tyler Klenk (CAN)
Steve Rogers (AUS)

=== Gold medal match ===
8 August 2022
12:30

| Australia | 7–0 | India |
|---|---|---|
| Govers 9'; Ephraums 14', 42'; Anderson 22', 27'; Wickham 26'; Ogilvie 46' | Report |

Umpires:
Dan Barstow (ENG)
David Tomlinson (NZL)

== Final position ==
| Pos. | Team |
|---|---|
| 1st place, gold medalist(s) | Australia |
| 2nd place, silver medalist(s) | India |
| 3rd place, bronze medalist(s) | England |
| 4 | South Africa |
| 5 | New Zealand |
| 6 | Wales |
| 7 | Pakistan |
| 8 | Canada |
| 9 | Scotland |
| 10 | Ghana |

== Goalscorers ==
There were 188 goals scored in 27 matches, for an average of 6.96 goals per match.

11 goals

- (England) Nick Bandurak

9 goals

- (India) Harmanpreet Singh
- (Wales) Gareth Furlong

8 goals

- (England) Phil Roper

7 goals

- (Australia) Blake Govers

6 goals

- (Australia) Nathan Ephraums
- (Australia) Jeremy Hayward

5 goals

- (Australia) Jacob Anderson
- (Australia) Tom Wickham
- (India) Mandeep Singh
- (New Zealand) Hugo Inglis
- (South Africa) Matthew Guise-Brown

4 goals

- (England) Zachary Wallace
- (Scotland) Cameron Golden
- (Scotland) Jamie Golden

3 goals

- (Australia) Aran Zalewski
- (Canada) Matthew Sarmento
- (England) Liam Ansell
- (England) Sam Ward
- (India) Akashdeep Singh
- (India) Jugraj Singh
- (New Zealand) Sam Lane
- (New Zealand) Jake Smith
- (Scotland) Struan Walker

2 goals

- (Australia) Tim Brand
- (Australia) Jacob Whetton
- (Canada) Brendan Guraliuk
- (Canada) Keegan Pereira
- (Ghana) Benjamin Kwofie
- (India) Abhishek
- (India) Gurjant Singh
- (India) Lalit Upadhyay
- (Pakistan) Afraz Hakeem
- (Pakistan) Ghazanfar Ali
- (Pakistan) Hannan Shahid
- (Scotland) Rob Harwood
- (South Africa) Connor Beauchamp
- (South Africa) Mustaphaa Cassiem
- (South Africa) Nqobile Ntuli

1 goal

- (Australia) Daniel Beale
- (Australia) Flynn Ogilvie
- (Australia) Joshua Simmonds
- (England) Will Calnan
- (England) David Condon
- (England) Stuart Rushmere
- (England) Rhys Smith
- (Ghana) Emmanuel Ankomah
- (Ghana) Francis Tettey
- (India) Varun Kumar
- (India) Amit Rohidas
- (India) Nilakanta Sharma
- (India) Shamsher Singh
- (New Zealand) Sean Findlay
- (New Zealand) Sam Hiha
- (New Zealand) Kane Russell
- (New Zealand) Dylan Thomas
- (New Zealand) Nic Woods
- (Pakistan) Muhammad Umar Bhutta
- (Pakistan) Rizwan Ali
- (Pakistan) Waheed Rana
- (Pakistan) Rooman Khan
- (Scotland) Callum Duke
- (Scotland) Alan Forsyth
- (Scotland) Andrew McConnell
- (Scotland) Callum Mackenzie
- (Scotland) Lee Morton
- (South Africa) Dayaan Cassiem
- (South Africa) Keenan Horne
- (South Africa) Ryan Julius
- (South Africa) Taine Paton
- (South Africa) Nicholas Spooner
- (Wales) James Carson
- (Wales) Owain Dolan-Gray
- (Wales) Benjamin Francis
- (Wales) Gareth Griffiths
- (Wales) Daniel Kyriakides
- (Wales) Lewis Prosser

Source: FIH
