= Daniel Kyriakides =

Welsh field hockey player (born 1995)

Dan Kyriakides
Personal information
- Born: 21 March 1995 (age 31) Swansea, Wales
- Height: 183 cm (6 ft 0 in)
- Weight: 85 kg (187 lb)

Sport
- Sport: Field hockey
- Position: Midfielder/Defender
Senior career
Years	Team	Caps	Goals
2012	Swansea City HC	-	-
2012–2017	Cardiff & Met	-	-
2017–2018	Reading	-	-
2018–2019	Crefelder HTC	-	-
2019–2020	Cardiff & Met	-	-
2020–2021	Crefelder HTC	-	-
2021–2022	Hampstead & Westminster	-	-
2022–2025	Alster	-	-
2025–2026	Cardiff & Met	-	-
National team
Years	Team	Caps	Goals
2014–present	Wales	138	-
2017–2018	GB	11	-
Medal record
Representing Wales
European Championship II
Gold medal – first place	2025 Lousada	Team

Daniel Kyriakides (born 21 March 1995) is a Welsh international field hockey player who plays as a midfielder or defender for Wales and Great Britain.

James Kyriakides is his elder brother.

== Biography ==
Kyriakides played club hockey in the Men's England Hockey League for Cardiff & Met from 2012 to 2017. While at Cardiff, Kyriakides represented Wales in the 2014 Commonwealth Games and made his senior Great Britain debut against India on 29 April 2017.

Later in 2017, he joined Reading in the Premier Division and went to his second Commonwealth Games at the 2018 Games in the Gold Coast.

At the end of the 2017–2018 season, Kyriakides left Reading for the Bundesliga, signing for Crefelder HTC but returned to the UK to play for Hampstead & Westminster in 2021.

In 2022, he joined Der Club an der Alster in Germany and was selected to represent Wales at the 2022 Commonwealth Games in Birmingham.

He was part of the Welsh team at the 2023 World Cup, which was the first time in their history that Wales had appeared in the world Cup. Additionally he was part of the Welsh team that played at the 2023 Men's EuroHockey Championship.

In 2025, he helped Wales win the gold medal at the European Championship II, defeating Ireland in the final. He moved back to Cardiff for the 2025–26 season.
