= 2023 Men's FIH Indoor Hockey World Cup =

Tournament details
- Host country: South Africa
- City: Pretoria
- Dates: 5–11 February
- Teams: 12 (from 5 confederations)
- Venue: Heartfelt Arena

Final positions
- Champions: Austria (2nd title)
- Runner-up: Netherlands
- Third place: Iran

Tournament statistics
- Matches played: 40
- Goals scored: 324 (8.1 per match)
- Top scorer: (Austria) Michael Körper (17 goals)
- Best player: (Austria) Fabian Unterkircher
- Best young player: (South Africa) Mustapha Cassiem
- Best goalkeeper: (Austria) Mateusz Szymczyk

The 2023 Men's Indoor Hockey World Cup was the sixth edition of this tournament and played from 5 to 11 February 2023 in Pretoria, South Africa.

Austria won their second consecutive title by defeating the Netherlands in the final after penalty shootout, while Iran captured the bronze medal, winning against the United States.

== Qualification ==
All the teams which qualified for the cancelled 2022 edition of the tournament were eligible to participate in the 2023 edition.

Dates	Event	Location	Quotas	Qualifier(s)
15–21 July 2019	2019 Indoor Asia Cup	Chonburi, Thailand	2	Iran; Kazakhstan
17–19 January 2020	2020 EuroHockey Indoor Championship	Berlin, Germany	4	Austria; Belgium; Czech Republic; ~~Germany~~ (Note: Germany withdrew and were replaced by New Zealand.); Netherlands; ~~Russia~~ (Note: Following advice from the International Olympic Committee, Russia were excluded due to the 2022 Russian invasion of Ukraine and were replaced by Australia.)
16–18 April 2021	2021 Indoor Africa Cup	Durban, South Africa	2	Namibia; South Africa
25–27 June 2021	2021 Indoor Pan American Cup	Spring City, United States	2	Argentina; United States
9 August 2022	Invitational	—N/a	2	Australia; New Zealand
Total			12	

== First round ==
The schedule was released on 17 October 2022.

All times are local (UTC+2).

=== Pool A ===
Pos	Team	Pld	W	D	L	GF	GA	GD	Pts	Qualification
1	Austria	5	5	0	0	27	5	+22	15	Quarter-finals
2	Netherlands	5	4	0	1	36	7	+29	12	Quarter-finals
3	Belgium	5	3	0	2	20	16	+4	9	Quarter-finals
4	Namibia	5	1	1	3	12	19	−7	4	Quarter-finals
5	Kazakhstan	5	1	0	4	11	31	−20	3	Ninth place game
6	New Zealand	5	0	1	4	7	35	−28	1	Eleventh place game

Source: FIH
Rules for classification: 1) points; 2) matches won; 3) goal difference; 4) goals for; 5) head-to-head result; 6) field goals scored.

5 February 2023
16:40

Netherlands	7–1	Namibia
Sweering 6', 13', 23'; Schut 26'; Troost 36'; Leijs 37'; Merkus 39'	Report	Barthram 30'

Umpires:
Adam Barry (AUS)
Sophie Bockelmann (GER)

5 February 2023
19:00

Austria	7–1	New Zealand
Schmidt 1'; Unterkircher 3', 12', 32'; Eitenberger 7'; Fröhlich 17'; Frey 40'	Report	B. van Woerkom 27'

Umpires:
Ayden Shrives (RSA)
Sean Edwards (ENG)

5 February 2023
21:20

Belgium	7–1	Kazakhstan
Simar 4', 12', 14', 20', 40'; Hermans 8'; G. Dykmans 20'	Report	Urmanov 15'

Umpires:
Narongtuch Subboonsong (THA)
Lee Barron (ENG)

6 February 2023
08:30

Austria	2–0	Namibia
Unterkircher 9'; Binder 27'	Report

Umpires:
Adam Barry (AUS)
Emily Carroll (AUS)

6 February 2023
10:50

Netherlands	9–1	Kazakhstan
Bakker 2', 30'; Burkhardt 9', 30'; Middendorp 26'; Schut 28', 33', 35'; Troost 29'	Report	Almen 5'

Umpires:
Lee Barron (ENG)
Melina Illanes (ARG)

6 February 2023
13:10

New Zealand	2–7	Belgium
Coxon 9'; Houlbrooke 11'	Report	Simar 1', 32', 34'; Bigare 13'; G. Dykmans 19', 39'; Hermans 35'

Umpires:
Andrés Ortiz (ESP)
Łukasz Zwierzchowski (POL)

7 February 2023
16:40

Kazakhstan	2–6	Namibia
Urmanov 25', 40'	Report	Hermanus 8', 40'; D. Britz 14'; Barthram 20', 22'; Cleak 31'

Umpires:
Rachel Williams (ENG)
Andrés Ortiz (ESP)

7 February 2023
19:00

Belgium	1–5	Austria
Simar 13'	Report	Körper 4', 19'; Eitenberger 6'; Unterkircher 33', 38'

Umpires:
Ayden Shrives (RSA)
Łukasz Zwierzchowski (POL)

7 February 2023
21:20

New Zealand	0–12	Netherlands
	Report	Rohof 10+'; Burkhardt 15', 33', 34', 40'; Troost 18', 36'; Leijs 20'; Sweering 21'; Schut 30'; Bakker 32', 37'

Umpires:
Adam Barry (AUS)
Melina Illanes (ARG)

8 February 2023
09:40

Namibia	1–4	Belgium
Barthram 20'	Report	Simar 3', 4', 34'; G. Dykmans 29'

Umpires:
Diego Barbas (ARG)
Emily Carroll (AUS)

8 February 2023
12:00

Kazakhstan	5–0	New Zealand
Urmanov 4', 10'; Almen 25'; Zhokenbayev 32'; Dyussebekov 38'	Report

Umpires:
Ayden Shrives (RSA)
Melina Illanes (ARG)

8 February 2023
14:20

Netherlands	1–4	Austria
Burkhardt 36'	Report	Körper 10', 23', 30', 33'

Umpires:
Diego Barbas (ARG)
Sean Edwards (ENG)

9 February 2023
19:00

Belgium	1–7	Netherlands
Simar 36'	Report	Burkhardt 2', 21', 26', 39'; Troost 6'; Schut 13'; Leijs 38'

Umpires:
Lee Barron (ENG)
Adam Barry (AUS)

9 February 2023
20:10

Austria	9–2	Kazakhstan
Stanzl 5'; Losonci 9'; Unterkircher 10', 25', 30'; Körper 23', 27', 30', 37'	Report	Duisengazy 28'; Urmanov 39'

Umpires:
Sophie Bockelmann (GER)
Łukasz Zwierzchowski (POL)

9 February 2023
21:20

Namibia	4–4	New Zealand
Finch 1'; Hermanus 8', 17'; Neethling 13'	Report	Coxon 17'; Alexander-Parker 20', 37'; Van Woerkom 20'

Umpires:
Diego Barbas (ARG)
Céline Martin-Schmets (BEL)

=== Pool B ===
Pos	Team	Pld	W	D	L	GF	GA	GD	Pts	Qualification
1	United States	5	4	0	1	23	19	+4	12	Quarter-finals
2	Iran	5	2	2	1	30	24	+6	8	Quarter-finals
3	South Africa (H)	5	2	2	1	23	21	+2	8	Quarter-finals
4	Argentina	5	2	1	2	20	21	−1	7	Quarter-finals
5	Czech Republic	5	0	3	2	22	27	−5	3	Ninth place game
6	Australia	5	0	2	3	14	20	−6	2	Eleventh place game

Source: FIH
Rules for classification: 1) points; 2) matches won; 3) goal difference; 4) goals for; 5) head-to-head result; 6) field goals scored.
(H) Hosts

5 February 2023
09:40

Australia	3–3	South Africa
B. Staines 20'; Sherren 24'; J. Staines 30'	Report	M. Cassiem 7', 16'; Eustice 36'

Umpires:
Sean Edwards (ENG)
Andrés Ortiz (ESP)

5 February 2023
12:00

Iran	4–5	Argentina
Karimi 8', 9'; Beiranvand 18'; Mirzakhani 29'	Report	Navarro 13', 32'; Ceballos 23'; Eleicegui 26'; Ayala 31'

Umpires:
Ayden Shrives (RSA)
Rachel Williams (ENG)

5 February 2023
14:20

Czech Republic	3–4	United States
Plochý 6'; Seemann 8'; Soukup 40'	Report	Leser 3', 21', 37'; A. Käppeler 14'

Umpires:
Łukasz Zwierzchowski (POL)
Céline Martin-Schmets (BEL)

6 February 2023
15:30

Argentina	3–1	Australia
Eleicegui 14', 22'; Ayala 33'	Report	J. Staines 34'

Umpires:
Lee Barron (ENG)
Sean Edwards (ENG)

6 February 2023
17:50

Iran	8–3	United States
Norouzzadeh 2', 40', 40'; Beiranvand 3'; Nooranian 19', 35'; Taherirad 29', 39'	Report	Heldens 20', 27'; Harris 23'

Umpires:
Diego Barbas (ARG)
Céline Martin-Schmets (BEL)

6 February 2023
20:10

Czech Republic	4–8	South Africa
Toms 2'; Plochý 10', 10'; Hanus 27'	Report	D. Cassiem 3'; M. Cassiem 14', 22', 23', 25', 29'; Futcher 28'; Eustice 37'

Umpires:
Rachel Williams (ENG)
Sophie Bockelmann (GER)

7 February 2023
08:30

Australia	4–6	Iran
Sherren 11', 32', 39'; B. Staines 27'	Report	Beiranvand 14', 23'; Taherirad 16'; Norouzzadeh 21', 31', 38'

Umpires:
Lee Barron (ENG)
Łukasz Zwierzchowski (POL)

7 February 2023
12:00

South Africa	2–5	United States
M. Cassiem 1'; Julius 12'	Report	Leser 1', 6'; Kentwell 17'; A. Käppeler 33'; Harris 40'

Umpires:
Andrés Ortiz (ESP)
Emily Carroll (AUS)

7 February 2023
14:20

Argentina	3–3	Czech Republic
Navarro 25'; Rodríguez 35'; González 38'	Report	Tomeš 14'; Plochý 28'; Trejbal 40'

Umpires:
Lee Barron (ENG)
Adam Barry (AUS)

8 February 2023
16:40

United States	7–4	Argentina
A. Käppeler 13', 30', 36'; Heldens 27'; Leser 29', 32'; Harris 38'	Report	González 15', 35'; Rodríguez 35'; Eleicegui 36'

Umpires:
Andrés Ortiz (ESP)
Sophie Bockelmann (GER)

8 February 2023
19:00

Iran	4–4	South Africa
Mirzakhani 2'; Bahrami 26', 40'; Norouzzadeh 30'	Report	M. Cassiem 1', 29', 37'; D. Cassiem 36'

Umpires:
Adam Barry (AUS)
Sean Edwards (ENG)

8 February 2023
21:20

Australia	4–4	Czech Republic
J. Staines 4', 20+', 38'; Knee 14'	Report	Tomeš 17'; Plochý 22', 39'; Seemann 34'

Umpires:
Łukasz Zwierzchowski (POL)
Céline Martin-Schmets (BEL)

9 February 2023
09:40

South Africa	6–5	Argentina
D. Cassiem 1', 23'; M. Cassiem 5', 40'; Futcher 18', 26'	Report	Eleicegui 9'; Navarro 16'; Ceballos 20', 36'; Rodríguez 35'

Umpires:
Adam Barry (AUS)
Sean Edwards (ENG)

9 February 2023
12:00

United States	4–2	Australia
A. Käppeler 2', 13'; Kentwell 15'; Harris 22'	Report	Czinner 8'; B. Staines 37'

Umpires:
Lee Barron (ENG)
Ayden Shrives (RSA)

9 February 2023
14:20

Czech Republic	8–8	Iran
Plochý 2', 9'; Procházka 6', 20', 31', 38'; Toms 7'; Tomeš 25'	Report	Karimi 3'; Norouzzadeh 5', 40'; Nooranian 8', 28'; Bohlouli 29'; Bahrami 33'; Asnaashari 38'

Umpires:
Diego Barbas (ARG)
Rachel Williams (ENG)

== Classification matches ==
=== Eleventh place game ===
11 February 2023
08:00

New Zealand	2–7	Australia
Harvey 19', 32'	Report	B. Staines 1', 14', 37', 40'; Pace 12', 23'; Knee 38'

Umpires:
Diego Barbas (ARG)
Céline Martin-Schmets (BEL)

=== Ninth place game ===
11 February 2023
15:30

Kazakhstan	2–5	Czech Republic
Almen 36'; Urmanov 39'	Report	Toms 11'; Procházka 15'; Plochý 18', 26'; Seemann 23'

Umpires:
Ayden Shrives (RSA)
Łukasz Zwierzchowski (POL)

== Second round ==
=== Bracket ===
Quarter-finals
10 February
Austria	2
Argentina	0
10 February
Iran (p.s.o.)	5 (6)
Belgium	5 (5)
10 February
Netherlands	6
South Africa	3
10 February
United States	3
Namibia	2

Semi-finals
11 February
Austria	8
Iran	3
11 February
Netherlands	7
United States	3

Final
11 February
Austria (p.s.o.)	4 (3)
Netherlands	4 (2)
Third place
11 February
Iran (p.s.o.)	4 (3)
United States	4 (2)

=== Quarter-finals ===
10 February 2023
11:30

Iran	5–5	Belgium
Norouzzadeh 23', 32', 35'; Mirzakhani 25', 37'	Report	Van Bogaert 3', 25'; G. Dykmans 10'; Simar 23', 35'
Penalties
Norouzzadeh (penalty shoot-out scored); Beiranvand (penalty shoot-out scored); Mirzakhani (penalty shoot-out missed); Norouzzadeh (penalty shoot-out scored); Beiranvand (penalty shoot-out missed); Mirzakhani (penalty shoot-out scored); Norouzzadeh (penalty shoot-out scored); Beiranvand (penalty shoot-out missed); Mirzakhani (penalty shoot-out scored)	6–5	(penalty shoot-out missed) G. Dykmans; (penalty shoot-out scored) Bigare; (penalty shoot-out scored) A. Dykmans; (penalty shoot-out scored) A. Dykmans; (penalty shoot-out missed) Bigare; (penalty shoot-out scored) G. Dykmans; (penalty shoot-out scored) G. Dykmans; (penalty shoot-out missed) Bigare; (penalty shoot-out missed) A. Dykmans

Umpires:
Ayden Shrives (RSA)
Adam Barry (AUS)

10 February 2023
14:30

Austria	2–0	Argentina
Unterkircher 28'; Körper 34'	Report

Umpires:
Sean Edwards (ENG)
Rachel Williams (ENG)

10 February 2023
17:30

United States	3–2	Namibia
A. Käppeler 3'; Leser 21'; Harris 26'	Report	Barthram 5'; Hermanus 40'

Umpires:
Lee Barron (ENG)
Diego Barbas (ARG)

10 February 2023
20:30

Netherlands	6–3	South Africa
Burkhardt 2', 19'; Schut 12'; Troost 16'; Bakker 20', 38'	Report	Futcher 32'; D. Cassiem 33'; M. Cassiem 36'

Umpires:
Andrés Ortiz (ESP)
Sophie Bockelmann (GER)

=== Semi-finals ===
11 February 2023
09:30

Austria	8–3	Iran
Körper 4', 28', 39'; Unterkircher 10', 18'; Eitenberger 24', 30'; Binder 35'	Report	Beiranvand 15'; Nooranian 35'; Norouzzadeh 37'

Umpires:
Lee Barron (ENG)
Adam Barry (AUS)

11 February 2023
11:00

Netherlands	7–3	United States
Sweering 14', 32'; Middendorp 24'; Troost 25'; Burkhardt 37', 39'; Schut 40'	Report	Harris 8'; A. Käppeler 23', 26'

Umpires:
Sean Edwards (ENG)
Andrés Ortiz (ESP)

=== Third place game ===
11 February 2023
17:00

Iran	4–4	United States
Norouzzadeh 4', 16'; Mirzakhani 22'; Karimi 33'	Report	Kentwell 9', 14', 30'; A. Käppeler 37'
Penalties
Norouzzadeh (penalty shoot-out scored); Karimi (penalty shoot-out scored); Mirzakhani (penalty shoot-out scored)	3–2	(penalty shoot-out missed) Harris; (penalty shoot-out scored) Leser; (penalty shoot-out scored) A. Käppeler

Umpires:
Lee Barron (ENG)
Adam Barry (AUS)

=== Final ===
11 February 2023
20:00

Austria	4–4	Netherlands
Körper 9', 11', 36'; Fröhlich 23'	Report	Sweering 10', 17'; Leijs 22'; Troost 29'
Penalties
Eitenberger (penalty shoot-out missed); Unterkircher (penalty shoot-out scored); Körper (penalty shoot-out scored); Unterkircher (penalty shoot-out scored)	3–2	(penalty shoot-out scored) Burkhardt; (penalty shoot-out missed) Bakker; (penalty shoot-out scored) Sweering; (penalty shoot-out missed) Burkhardt

Umpires:
Rachel Williams (ENG)
Sean Edwards (ENG)

== Final standings ==
Rank	Team
Gold medal	Austria
Silver medal	Netherlands
Bronze medal	Iran
4	United States
5	Belgium
6	South Africa
7	Argentina
8	Namibia
9	Czech Republic
10	Kazakhstan
11	Australia
12	New Zealand

== Awards ==
The following awards were given at the conclusion of the tournament.

Award	Player
Player of the tournament	(Austria) Fabian Unterkircher
Top goalscorer	(Austria) Michael Körper
Goalkeeper of the tournament	(Austria) Mateusz Szymczyk
Young player of the tournament	(South Africa) Mustapha Cassiem

== Goalscorers ==
There were 324 goals scored in 40 matches, for an average of 8.1 goals per match.

17 goals

- (Austria) Michael Körper

16 goals

- (Iran) Reza Norouzzadeh

15 goals

- (Belgium) Philippe Simar
- (Netherlands) Boris Burkhardt

14 goals

- (South Africa) Mustapha Cassiem

12 goals

- (Austria) Fabian Unterkircher

11 goals

- (United States) Aki Käppeler

10 goals

- (Czech Republic) Lukas Plochý

8 goals

- (Netherlands) Wiegert Schut
- (Netherlands) Max Sweering
- (Netherlands) Joep Troost
- (United States) Marius Leser

7 goals

- (Australia) Benjamin Staines
- (Kazakhstan) Daulet Urmanov

6 goals

- (Netherlands) Jochem Bakker
- (United States) Patrick Harris

5 goals

- (Argentina) Juan Eleicegui
- (Australia) Jake Staines
- (Belgium) Gaetan Dykmans
- (Czech Republic) Tomas Procházka
- (Iran) Behdad Beiranvand
- (Iran) Hamid Nooranian
- (Namibia) Percy Barthram
- (Namibia) Liam Hermanus
- (South Africa) Dayaan Cassiem
- (United States) Stuart Kentwell

4 goals

- (Argentina) Facundo Navarro
- (Australia) Jake Sherren
- (Austria) Sebastian Eitenberger
- (Iran) Mohammad Karimi
- (Iran) Amirmahdi Mirzakhani
- (Netherlands) Nicki Leijs
- (South Africa) Chad Futcher

3 goals

- (Argentina) Agustín Ceballos
- (Argentina) Joaquín González
- (Argentina) Gastón Rodríguez
- (Czech Republic) Martin Seemann
- (Czech Republic) Denis Tomeš
- (Czech Republic) Josef Toms
- (Iran) Yaghoub Bahrami
- (Iran) Navid Taherirad
- (Kazakhstan) Talant Almen
- (United States) Jack Heldens

2 goals

- (Argentina) Nehuen Ayala
- (Australia) James Knee
- (Australia) Ryan Pace
- (Austria) Oliver Binder
- (Austria) Daniel Fröhlich
- (Belgium) Brian Van Bogaert
- (Belgium) Cyril Hermans
- (Netherlands) Lucas Middendorp
- (New Zealand) Brennan Alexander-Parker
- (New Zealand) Bradley Coxon
- (New Zealand) Vance Harvey
- (New Zealand) Benedict van Woerkom
- (South Africa) Jethro Eustice

1 goal

- (Australia) Nathan Czinner
- (Austria) Moritz Frey
- (Austria) Fülöp Losonci
- (Austria) Patrick Schmidt
- (Austria) Benjamin Stanzl
- (Belgium) Quentin Bigare
- (Czech Republic) Martin Hanus
- (Czech Republic) Vít Soukup
- (Czech Republic) Josef Trejbal
- (Iran) Mohammad Asnaashari
- (Iran) Mohsen Bohlouli
- (Kazakhstan) Agymtay Duisengazy
- (Kazakhstan) Yerkebulan Dyussebekov
- (Kazakhstan) Maxat Zhokenbayev
- (Namibia) David Britz
- (Namibia) Brynn Cleak
- (Namibia) Dylan Finch
- (Namibia) Nico Neethling
- (Netherlands) Niek Merkus
- (Netherlands) Teun Rohof
- (New Zealand) Isaac Houlbrooke
- (South Africa) Ryan Julius

Source: FIH

== See also ==
- 2023 Men's FIH Hockey World Cup
- 2023 Women's FIH Indoor Hockey World Cup
