= 2024 Men's Nkosi Cup =

Tournament details
- Host country: South Africa
- City: Cape Town
- Dates: 13–17 December
- Teams: 4 (from 3 confederations) (from 2 associations)
- Venue: Wynberg Military Base Stadium

Final positions
- Champions: South Africa
- Runner-up: Namibia
- Third place: Ireland

Tournament statistics
- Matches played: 10
- Goals scored: 84 (8.4 per match)
- Top scorer: (South Africa) Mustapha Cassiem (14 goals)
- Best goalkeeper: (New Zealand) Richter van Rooyen

The 2024 Nkosi Cup was the second edition of the Nkosi Cup, an annual invitational international men's indoor hockey tournament in South Africa. It was held in Wynberg Military Base Stadium, Cape Town, South Africa from 13 to 17 December 2024.

== Teams ==
Ireland
1. Stephen O'Keeffe (C, GK)
2. Jakim Bernsden (GK)
3. Ryan Williams
4. Harry Macmahon
5. Jack Haycock
6. Ben O'Grady
7. Oliver Kidd
8. Scott McCabe
9. Ross Canning
10. Greg Williams
11. James Walker
12. Craig MacKay
Namibia
2. Richter van Rooyen (GK)
4. Roben Kambinda (GK)
6. David Britz
7. Fagan Hansen
8. John-Paul Britz
9. Cody van der Merwe
10. Nico Neethling
12. Dakota Hansen
13. Pieter Jacobs (C)
14. Matukaramove Kavikairiua
18. Delron Handura
19. Brynn Cleak (C)
New Zealand
1. Max Ruffell (GK)
2. Luka Clark
4. Benedict van Woerkom
5. David Green (C)
7. Matthew Symonds
8. Daniel Scanlon
9. Maks Wyndham-Smith
10. Isaac Houlbrooke
12. Ben Allen
13. Jarryd Russell
16. Alexander Sumenko-Bucknell
19. Angus Griffin (GK)
South Africa
1. Anton van Loggerenberg (GK)
2. Mustapha Cassiem
5. Justin Domleo
6. Hans Neethling
7. Dayaan Cassiem (C)
10. Keegan Hezlett
13. Litha Kraai
16. Dalpiarro Langford
17. Rusten Abrahams
21. Jethro Eustice
23. Cullin de Jager (GK)
25. Leruo Ditlhakanyane

== Preliminary round ==
All times are local (All times are local (UTC+2)

Pos	Team	Pld	W	D	L	GF	GA	GD	Pts
1	South Africa (H)	3	3	0	0	20	7	+13	9
2	New Zealand	3	2	0	1	13	16	−3	6
3	Namibia	3	1	0	2	12	9	+3	3
4	Ireland	3	0	0	3	8	21	−13	0

Source: FIH
Rules for classification: 1) points; 2) matches won; 3) goal difference; 4) goals for; 5) head-to-head result; 6) field goals for.
(H) Hosts

13 December 2024
17:15

Namibia	7–2	Ireland
Van der Merwe 6'; D. Hansen 9'; F. Hansen 23', 39'; Jacobs 26'; Cleak 37'; JP Britz 37'	Report	Canning 27'; Walker 28'

Umpires:
Ayden Shrives (RSA)
Baskar Raman (MAS)

13 December 2024
19:45

South Africa	10–2	New Zealand
Kraai 7', 40'; Domleo 9'; D. Cassiem 11', 25'; Neethling 12', 38'; M. Cassiem 24', 38'; Hezlett 33'	Report	Houlbrooke 18'; Van Woerkom 32'

Umpires:
Colm Kavanagh (IRL)
Siyabonga Martins (NAM)

14 December 2024
17:15

New Zealand	7–3	Ireland
Wyndham-Smith 4', 34'; Clark 13'; Allen 20', 31'; Houlbrooke 33', 38'	Report	Canning 9'; MacKay 14', 27'

Umpires:
Ayden Shrives (RSA)
Siyabonga Martins (NAM)

14 December 2024
19:45

Namibia	2–3	South Africa
Cleak 5'; D. Hansen 16'	Report	M. Cassiem 29', 34', 36'

Umpires:
Baskar Raman (MAS)
Colm Kavanagh (IRL)

15 December 2024
16:15

New Zealand	4–3	Namibia
Wyndham-Smith 8'; Clark 11'; Van Woerkom 28', 35'	Report	Jacobs 34', 37'; F. Hansen 37'

Umpires:
Colm Kavanagh (IRL)
Ayden Shrives (RSA)

15 December 2024
18:45

Ireland	3–7	South Africa
MacKay 3'; Canning 19'; Kidd 37'	Report	M. Cassiem 4', 13', 25', 39'; Domleo 8'; Kraai 16'; Neethling 34'

Umpires:
Baskar Raman (MAS)
Siyabonga Martins (NAM)

== Final round ==
=== Bracket ===
Semi-finals
16 December
South Africa	6
Ireland	1
16 December
New Zealand	3
Namibia	6

Final
17 December
South Africa	3
Namibia	2
Third place
17 December
Ireland (p.s.o.)	5 (2)
New Zealand	5 (0)

=== Semi–Final ===
16 December 2024
17:15

South Africa	6–1	Ireland
Eustice 3', 26'; D. Cassiem 4'; M. Cassiem 24', 38'; Neethling 40'	Report	MacKay 39'

Umpires:
Baskar Raman (MAS)
Siyabonga Martins (NAM)

16 December 2024
18:30

New Zealand	3–6	Namibia
Scanlon 12'; Van Woerkom 15'; Houlbrooke 36'	Report	JP Britz 1', 13', 40'; D. Hansen 8'; Cleak 33'; F. Hansen 38'

Umpires:
Ayden Shrives (RSA)
Colm Kavanagh (IRL)

=== 3rd–4th Place ===
17 December 2024
17:15

Ireland	5–5	New Zealand
Canning 3', 17', 26'; Williams 14'; Kidd 21'	Report	Wyndham-Smith 18'; Van Woerkom 22', 26', 33', 40'
Penalties
Canning (penalty shoot-out scored); Williams (penalty shoot-out scored)	2–0	(penalty shoot-out missed) Houlbrooke; (penalty shoot-out missed) Symonds

Umpires:
Ayden Shrives (RSA)
Baskar Raman (MAS)

=== Final ===
17 December 2024
19:45

South Africa	3–2	Namibia
M. Cassiem 26', 27', 37'	Report	JP Britz 16'; F. Hansen 29'

Umpires:
Colm Kavanagh (IRL)
Siyabonga Martins (NAM)

== Statistics ==
=== Final standings ===
Pos	Team
1st place, gold medalist(s)	South Africa (H)
2nd place, silver medalist(s)	Namibia
3rd place, bronze medalist(s)	Ireland
4	New Zealand

Source: FIH
(H) Host

=== Goalscorers ===
There were 84 goals scored in 10 matches, for an average of 8.4 goals per match.

14 goals

- (South Africa) Mustapha Cassiem

8 goals

- (New Zealand) Benedict van Woerkom

6 goals

- (Ireland) Ross Canning

5 goals

- (Namibia) John-Paul Britz
- (Namibia) Fagan Hansen

4 goals

- (Ireland) Craig MacKay
- (New Zealand) Isaac Houlbrooke
- (New Zealand) Maks Wyndham-Smith
- (South Africa) Hans Neethling

3 goals

- (Namibia) Brynn Cleak
- (Namibia) Dakota Hansen
- (Namibia) Pieter Jacobs
- (South Africa) Dayaan Cassiem
- (South Africa) Litha Kraai

2 goals

- (Ireland) Oliver Kidd
- (New Zealand) Ben Allen
- (New Zealand) Luka Clark
- (South Africa) Justin Domleo
- (South Africa) Jethro Eustice

1 goal

- (Ireland) James Walker
- (Ireland) Greg Williams
- (Namibia) Cody van der Merwe
- (New Zealand) Daniel Scanlon
- (South Africa) Keegan Hezlett

Source: FIH

== See also ==
- 2024 Women's Nkosi Cup
