= 2023 Men's Nkosi Cup =

Tournament details
- Host country: South Africa
- City: Cape Town
- Dates: 15–18 December
- Teams: 3
- Venue: Wynberg Military Base Stadium

Final positions
- Champions: South Africa (1st title)
- Runner-up: Namibia
- Third place: United States

Tournament statistics
- Matches played: 7
- Goals scored: 69 (9.86 per match)
- Top scorer: (South Africa) Mustapha Cassiem (11 goals)

The inaugural Nkosi Cup gears up to kick off from 15 to 19 December 2023. Hosted at the prestigious Wynberg Military Sports Stadium.

South Africa were the inaugural World Cup winners, beating Namibia in the final, 10–2.

== Teams ==
Namibia
1. David Strauss (C, GK)
2. Richter van Rooyen (GK)
4. Owen Hatton
5. Liam Hermanus
6. David Britz
7. Fagan Hansen
8. John-Paul Britz
9. Cody van der Merwe
10. Nico Neethling
11. Percy Barthram
12. Dakota Hansen
13. Pieter Jacobs
19. Brynn Cleak
South Africa
1. Anton van Loggerenberg (GK)
2. Mustapha Cassiem
5. Justin Domleo
7. Dayaan Cassiem (C)
8. Steven Paulo
9. Lungani Gabela
10. Keegan Hezlett
11. Daniel Sibbald
13. Luke Inactive Lange
16. Dalpiarro Langford
18. Idrees Abdulla
19. Ryan Julius
23. Bongumusa Mngoma (GK)
United States
5. Patrick Harris (C)
6. Alexander Grassi
14. Aki Käppeler (C)
17. Christian DeAngelis
28. Dean Schiller
44. Koehl Comiskey
45. Jack Weitzman
51. Lasse Nobereit
79. Luke Jackson (GK)
84. Barry Merriman (GK)
99. Gavin Chung

== Preliminary round ==
All times are local (All times are local (UTC+2)

Pos	Team	Pld	W	D	L	GF	GA	GD	Pts	Qualification
1	Namibia	4	3	0	1	19	11	+8	9	Final
2	South Africa (H)	4	3	0	1	24	17	+7	9	Final
3	United States	4	0	0	4	14	29	−15	0	

Source: FIH
Rules for classification: 1) points; 2) matches won; 3) goal difference; 4) goals for; 5) head-to-head result; 6) field goals for.
(H) Hosts

15 December 2023
18:45

Namibia	5–3	United States
Hatton 3'; Hermanus 9', 22'; Hansen 26'; Britz 39'	Report	Käppeler 7'; Nobereit 31'; Harris 39'

16 December 2023
13:15

Namibia	3–4	South Africa
Hatton 22'; Barthram 27'; Hansen 30'	Report	M. Cassiem 23', 34'; Julius 35', 37'

16 December 2023
20:00

United States	5–11	South Africa
Grassi 6'; Comiskey 12', 32'; Käppeler 22', 28'	Report	M. Cassiem 4', 22', 32'; Paulo 5'; Julius 12', 39'; Langford 19', 29', 40'; D. Cassiem 33'; Hezlett 35'

17 December 2023
15:00

Namibia	5–2	South Africa
Hansen 7', 11', 27'; Jacobs 20'; Hatton 33'	Report	D. Cassiem 32'; M. Cassiem 39'

17 December 2023
19:45

Namibia	6–2	United States
Hermanus 3', 4'; Jacobs 7'; Barthram 16'; Neethling 25'; Cleak 33'	Report	Käppeler 10', 10'

18 December 2023
20:00

South Africa	7–4	United States
M. Cassiem 4', 28', 29'; Paulo 19', 20'; Julius 30'; Langford 37'	Report	Käppeler 10', 20', 37'; Nobereit 21'

== Final ==
19 December 2023
20:00

Namibia	2–10	South Africa
Hermanus 30', 38'	Report	Abdulla 11', 34', 39'; D. Cassiem 12'; M. Cassiem 14', 34'; Paulo 24'; Julius 25'; Langford 38'; Gabela 40'

== Statistics ==
=== Final standings ===
Pos	Team
1	South Africa (H)
2	Namibia
3	United States

Source: FIH
(H) Host

=== Goalscorers ===
There were 69 goals scored in 7 matches, for an average of 9.86 goals per match.

11 goals

- (South Africa) Mustapha Cassiem

8 goals

- (United States) Aki Käppeler

6 goals

- (Namibia) Liam Hermanus
- (South Africa) Ryan Julius

5 goals

- (South Africa) Dalpiarro Langford

4 goals

- (Namibia) Fagan Hansen
- (South Africa) Steven Paulo

3 goals

- (Namibia) Owen Hatton
- (South Africa) Idrees Abdulla
- (South Africa) Dayaan Cassiem
- (United States) Lasse Nobereit

2 goals

- (Namibia) Percy Barthram
- (Namibia) Pieter Jacobs

1 goal

- (Namibia) John-Paul Britz
- (Namibia) Brynn Cleak
- (Namibia) Dakota Hansen
- (Namibia) Nico Neethling
- (South Africa) Lungani Gabela
- (South Africa) Keegan Hezlett
- (United States) Koehl Comiskey
- (United States) Alexander Grassi
- (United States) Patrick Harris

Source: FIH
