= 2018 Men's Indoor Hockey World Cup =

International Indoor Hockey tournament

Tournament details
- Host country: Germany
- City: Berlin
- Dates: 7–11 February
- Teams: 12 (from 5 confederations)
- Venue: Max-Schmeling-Halle

Final positions
- Champions: Austria (1st title)
- Runner-up: Germany
- Third place: Iran

Tournament statistics
- Matches played: 40
- Goals scored: 306 (7.65 per match)
- Top scorer: (Germany) Christopher Rühr (19 goals)
- Best player: (Germany) Christopher Rühr
- Best goalkeeper: (Iran) Sasan Hataminejad

The 2018 Men's Indoor Hockey World Cup was the fifth edition of this tournament and played from 7 to 11 February 2018 in Berlin, Germany. The Netherlands were the reigning champions, but did not return to defend their title due to their poor performance at the 2016 European Indoor Championship.

Austria defeated Germany in the final after penalties to win their first title, while Iran secured their first medal.

== Qualification ==
Twelve teams qualified to participate in the tournament.

Host nation & Continental qualifiers
Dates	Event	Quotas	Qualifier(s)
18 January 2017	Host nation	1	Germany
24–28 April 2017	Asian Indoor Cup	1	Iran
23–25 June 2017	African Indoor Cup	1	South Africa
15–17 January 2016	EuroHockey Indoor Championship	1	Austria
	Oceania Indoor Qualification Tournament	1	Australia
16–21 October 2017	Pan American Indoor Cup	1	Trinidad and Tobago
Best six ranked teams from continental tournaments
Dates	Event	Quotas	Qualifier(s)
24–28 April 2017	Asian Indoor Cup	1	Kazakhstan
15–17 January 2016	EuroHockey Indoor Championship	5	Belgium; Czech Republic; Poland; Russia; Switzerland

== Umpires ==
12 umpires were appointed by the FIH for this tournament.

- Diego Barbas (ARG)
- Lee Barron (ENG)
- Adam Barry (AUS)
- Daniel Denta (DEN)
- Bart de Liefde (NED)
- Michael Eilmer (AUT)
- Donny Gobinsingh (TRI)
- Ben Göntgen (GER)
- Aliaksandr Hrachou (BLR)
- Pawel Linkowski (POL)
- Luis Martínez (ESP)
- Ayden Shrives (RSA)

== Results ==
The schedule was released on 19 September 2017.

All times are local (UTC+1).

=== First round ===
==== Pool A ====
Pos	Team	Pld	W	D	L	GF	GA	GD	Pts	Qualification
1	Germany (H)	5	5	0	0	44	11	+33	15	Quarter-finals
2	Australia	5	3	1	1	21	19	+2	10	Quarter-finals
3	Czech Republic	5	2	2	1	26	16	+10	8	Quarter-finals
4	Poland	5	2	1	2	31	22	+9	7	Quarter-finals
5	Trinidad and Tobago	5	1	0	4	21	39	−18	3	Ninth place game
6	Kazakhstan	5	0	0	5	11	47	−36	0	Eleventh place game

Source: FIH
Rules for classification: 1) points; 2) goal difference; 3) goals scored; 4) head-to-head result.
(H) Hosts

7 February 2018
12:30

Germany	15–0	Kazakhstan
Rühr 1', 5', 17', 22'; Grambusch 3', 12', 14'; Otte 7'; Zwicker 9'; Häner 10'; Miltkau 11', 22', 25'; Pehlke 20', 39'	Report

Umpires:
Ayden Shrives (RSA)
Donny Gobinsingh (TRI)

7 February 2018
12:45

Czech Republic	7–2	Trinidad and Tobago
Kyndl 3', 9'; Vacek 4', 28'; Plochý 6'; Procházka 14'; Seemann 16'	Report	Daniel 36'; Emmanuel 40'

Umpires:
Daniel Denta (DEN)
Michael Eilmer (AUT)

7 February 2018
13:55

Poland	3–5	Australia
Weide 22', 31'; Żywiczka 32'	Report	Sutherland 2'; Hayes 16', 24', 38'; Knee 18'

Umpires:
Ben Göntgen (GER)
Diego Barbas (ARG)

7 February 2018
19:30

Poland	11–5	Trinidad and Tobago
Makowski 19'; Kasprzyk 20', 22'; Mikuła 23', 32', 39'; Górny 24', 24'; Weide 28', 37'; Poltaszewski 40'	Report	Eccles 8'; Pierre 9', 14'; De Gannes 23'; Vieira 25'

Umpires:
Daniel Denta (DEN)
Diego Barbas (ARG)

7 February 2018
19:45

Kazakhstan	3–9	Czech Republic
Urmanov 2', 38'; Tashkeyev 12'	Report	Kyndl 2', 22', 27', 30', 35'; Seemann 3'; Vacek 3', 17'; Procházka 36'

Umpires:
Luis Martínez (ESP)
Ben Göntgen (GER)

7 February 2018
20:45

Germany	7–1	Australia
Miltkau 8', 20', 26'; Rühr 17', 27', 27', 40'	Report	Hayes 14'

Umpires:
Bart de Liefde (NED)
Michael Eilmer (AUT)

8 February 2018
12:30

Czech Republic	5–6	Germany
Vacek 4'; Kyndl 8'; Seemann 11'; Plochý 19'; Procházka 28'	Report	Hauke 3'; Rühr 13'; Miltkau 16'; Grambusch 33', 34', 37'

Umpires:
Lee Barron (ENG)
Pawel Linkowski (POL)

8 February 2018
12:45

Kazakhstan	3–11	Poland
Tashkeyev 20'; Uzbek 25'; Kozhym 30'	Report	Poltaszewski 2'; Mikuła 3', 12', 26'; Weide 10', 19', 35'; Górny 23', 37', 38', 40'

Umpires:
Luis Martínez (ESP)
Donny Gobinsingh (TRI)

8 February 2018
15:05

Trinidad and Tobago	6–7	Australia
Pierre 2'; Toussaint 10'; Eccles 18', 40', 40+'; Reynos 27'	Report	Seccull 5', 17'; Hayes 11', 26'; Sutherland 15'; Ogilvie 19'; Noblett 30'

Umpires:
Aliaksandr Hrachou (BLR)
Ayden Shrives (RSA)

8 February 2018
19:30

Poland	3–6	Germany
Bratkowski 12'; Majchrzak 28'; Weide 37'	Report	Miltkau 4'; Pehlke 10', 26'; Rühr 18'; Häner 25'; Grambusch 40'

Umpires:
Aliaksandr Hrachou (BLR)
Ayden Shrives (RSA)

8 February 2018
21:50

Australia	2–2	Czech Republic
Sherren 4'; Seccull 23'	Report	Kyndl 20'; Procházka 40+'

Umpires:
Pawel Linkowski (POL)
Bart de Liefde (NED)

8 February 2018
22:05

Trinidad and Tobago	6–4	Kazakhstan
Toussaint 5', 7', 31'; Pierre 23'; Emmanuel 24'; Reynos 31'	Report	Dyussebekov 17'; Urmanov 28', 29'; Kozhym 32'

Umpires:
Lee Barron (ENG)
Adam Barry (AUS)

9 February 2018
10:40

Australia	6–1	Kazakhstan
Seccull 11'; Sherren 18'; Hayes 18'; Knee 25'; Sinclair 34'; Campbell 37'	Report	Kozhym 36'

Umpires:
Donny Gobinsingh (TRI)
Diego Barbas (ARG)

9 February 2018
11:50

Germany	10–2	Trinidad and Tobago
Miltkau 2', 8'; Pehlke 19', 40'; Zwicker 22'; Rühr 25', 31', 31', 38'; Hauke 26'	Report	Toussaint 11'; Pierre 35'

Umpires:
Daniel Denta (DEN)
Ayden Shrives (RSA)

9 February 2018
12:05

Czech Republic	3–3	Poland
Seemann 1'; Kyndl 19'; Plochý 37'	Report	Bratkowski 5'; Poltaszewski 9'; Weide 22'

Umpires:
Aliaksandr Hrachou (BLR)
Adam Barry (AUS)

==== Pool B ====
Pos	Team	Pld	W	D	L	GF	GA	GD	Pts	Qualification
1	Austria	5	3	2	0	26	14	+12	11	Quarter-finals
2	Iran	5	3	2	0	21	13	+8	11	Quarter-finals
3	Belgium	5	2	1	2	19	17	+2	7	Quarter-finals
4	Switzerland	5	2	1	2	9	11	−2	7	Quarter-finals
5	Russia	5	2	0	3	18	19	−1	6	Ninth place game
6	South Africa	5	0	0	5	9	28	−19	0	Eleventh place game

Source: FIH
Rules for classification: 1) points; 2) goal difference; 3) goals scored; 4) head-to-head result.

7 February 2018
13:40

Russia	5–0	South Africa
Golubev 17'; Proskuriakov 20', 29', 40'; Loginov 36'	Report

Umpires:
Bart de Liefde (NED)
Pawel Linkowski (POL)

7 February 2018
14:50

Iran	5–1	Switzerland
Beiranvand 11'; Norouzzadeh 15', 32'; Asnaashari 25'; Nooranian 37'	Report	Keller 8'

Umpires:
Aliaksandr Hrachou (BLR)
Adam Barry (AUS)

7 February 2018
15:05

Austria	7–2	Belgium
Körper 2', 23', 27', 34'; Eitenberger 3'; Uher 35'; Stanzl 39'	Report	Zimmer 7'; Dykmans 27'

Umpires:
Luis Martínez (ESP)
Lee Barron (ENG)

7 February 2018
20:55

Russia	1–3	Switzerland
Zamalutdinov 10'	Report	Morard 14'; Feller 39'; Greder 40'

Umpires:
Ayden Shrives (RSA)
Pawel Linkowski (POL)

7 February 2018
21:50

Austria	6–3	South Africa
Stanzl 4', 17'; Körper 23', 28'; Steyrer 24'; Uher 29'	Report	Eustice 9'; Fairweather 33'; Mea 40'

Umpires:
Aliaksandr Hrachou (BLR)
Donny Gobinsingh (TRI)

7 February 2018
22:05

Belgium	3–3	Iran
Charlier 2'; Boon 19', 35'	Report	Norouzzadeh 4', 15', 33'

Umpires:
Adam Barry (AUS)
Lee Barron (ENG)

8 February 2018
13:40

Belgium	4–5	Russia
Plennevaux 18', 38'; Boon 22', 40'; Asnaashari 25'; Nooranian 37'	Report	Zamalutdinov 4'; Proskuriakov 14', 27'; Kornilov 30', 36'

Umpires:
Diego Barbas (ARG)
Michael Eilmer (AUT)

8 February 2018
13:55

Switzerland	3–1	South Africa
Morard 4', 9', 18'	Report	Rosenberg 22'

Umpires:
Daniel Denta (DEN)
Ben Göntgen (GER)

8 February 2018
14:50

Iran	3–3	Austria
Taherirad 7', 37'; Norouzzadeh 8'	Report	Körper 13', 20+'; Stanzl 26'

Umpires:
Bart de Liefde (NED)
Adam Barry (AUS)

8 February 2018
19:45

South Africa	3–6	Iran
Paton 15'; Jones 19'; Rosenberg 29'	Report	Norouzzadeh 17', 27', 29', 37'; Sadi 27'; Taherirad 38'

Umpires:
Michael Eilmer (AUT)
Luis Martínez (ESP)

8 February 2018
20:40

Switzerland	0–2	Belgium
	Report	Boon 14'; Plennevaux 25'

Umpires:
Diego Barbas (ARG)
Daniel Denta (DEN)

8 February 2018
20:55

Russia	4–8	Austria
Kornilov 6'; Proskuriakov 9'; Agafontsev 23'; Golubev 33'	Report	Körper 2', 11', 20', 25'; Stanzl 8'; Uher 18', 28'; Bele 38'

Umpires:
Ayden Shrives (RSA)
Ben Göntgen (GER)

9 February 2018
09:30

Iran	4–3	Russia
Aroei 6'; Beiranvand 24'; Taherirad 25'; Bohlouli 26'	Report	Proskuriakov 7', 10'; Golubev 23'

Umpires:
Pawel Linkowski (POL)
Ben Göntgen (GER)

9 February 2018
09:45

South Africa	2–8	Belgium
Fairweather 11', 25'	Report	Plennevaux 3', 34'; Dykmans 7', 20', 39'; Zimmer 10'; Boon 23'; Degroote 36'

Umpires:
Lee Barron (ENG)
Michael Eilmer (AUT)

9 February 2018
10:55

Austria	2–2	Switzerland
Hasun 20'; Stanzl 28'	Report	Morard 19'; Feller 32'

Umpires:
Bart de Liefde (NED)
Luis Martínez (ESP)

=== Second round ===
Quarter-finals
9 February 2018
Germany	3
Switzerland	0
9 February 2018
Iran (p.s.o.)	2 (2)
Czech Republic	2 (1)
9 February 2018
Australia	4
Belgium	2
9 February 2018
Austria	2
Poland	1

Semi-finals
10 February 2018
Germany	6
Iran	2
10 February 2018
Australia	1
Austria	2

Final
11 February 2018
Germany	3 (2)
Austria (p.s.o.)	3 (3)
Third place
11 February 2018
Iran	5
Australia	0

==== Quarter-finals ====
9 February 2018
17:00

Iran	2–2	Czech Republic
Norouzzadeh 19', 28'	Report	Procházka 13'; Jahoda 15'
Penalties
Norouzzadeh (penalty shoot-out scored); Beiranvand (penalty shoot-out scored)	2–1	(penalty shoot-out scored) Vacek; (penalty shoot-out missed) Plochý; (penalty shoot-out missed) Seemann

Umpires:
Michael Eilmer (AUT)
Ayden Shrives (RSA)

9 February 2018
18:30

Austria	2–1	Poland
Eitenberger 24'; Körper 38'	Report	Makowski 32'

Umpires:
Ben Göntgen (GER)
Bart de Liefde (NED)

9 February 2018
20:00

Germany	3–0	Switzerland
Miltkau 8'; Häner 17'; Rühr 30'	Report

Umpires:
Adam Barry (AUS)
Lee Barron (ENG)

9 February 2018
21:30

Australia	4–2	Belgium
Hayes 2', 29'; Sherren 11'; Knee 40'	Report	Degroote 24'; Zimmer 37'

Umpires:
Pawel Linkowski (POL)
Diego Barbas (ARG)

==== Eleventh and twelfth place ====
10 February 2018
10:30

Kazakhstan	1–6	South Africa
Urmanov 39'	Report	Fairweather 9', 20'; Julius 24'; Jones 25'; Eustice 32', 37'

Umpires:
Donny Gobinsingh (TRI)
Pawel Linkowski (POL)

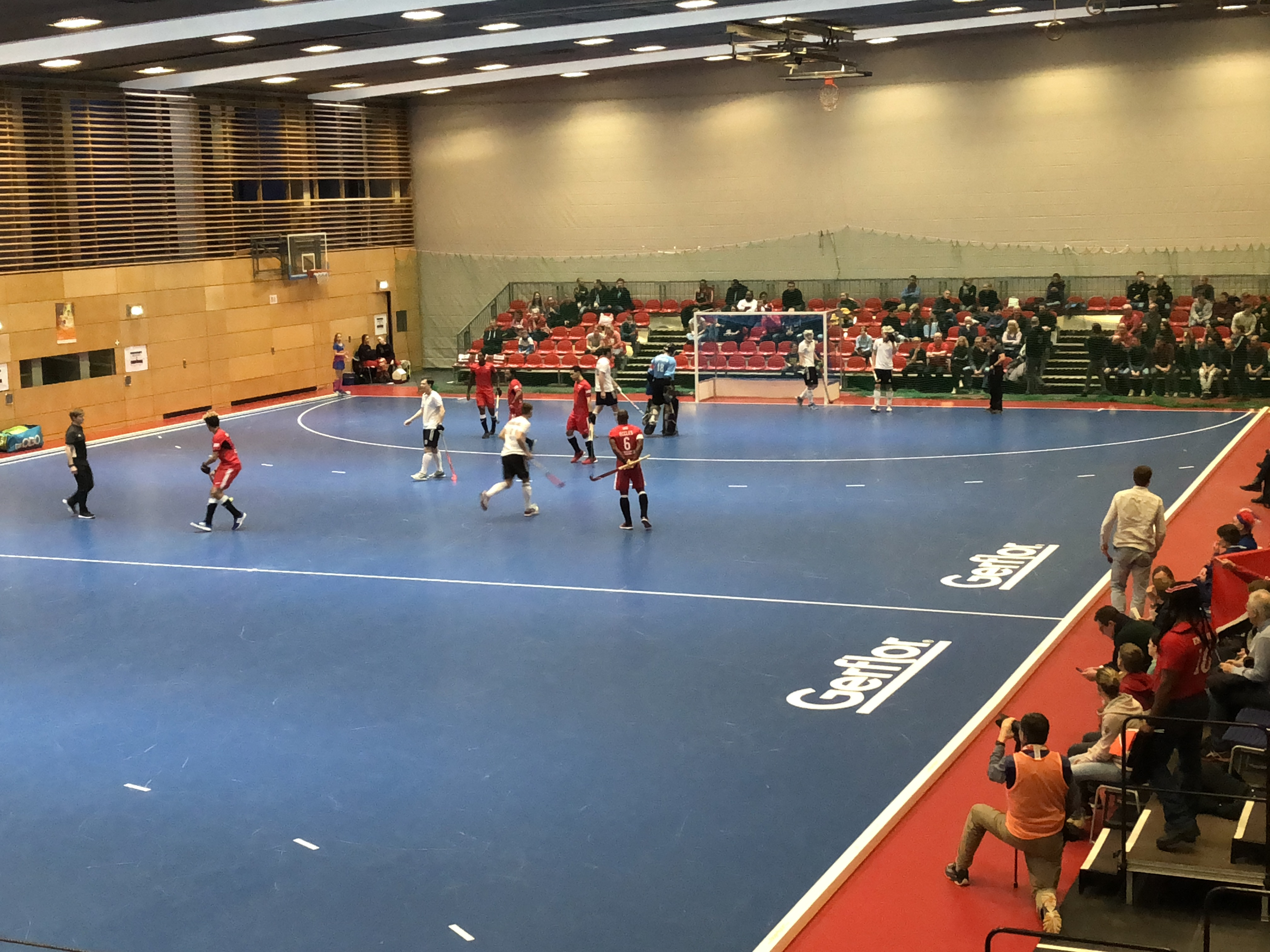
Trinidad and Tobago vs. Russia

==== Ninth and tenth place ====
10 February 2018
12:00

Trinidad and Tobago	2–3	Russia
Vieira 20+'; Toussaint 33'	Report	Kuraev 6'; Golubev 10', 40'

Umpires:
Diego Barbas (ARG)
Daniel Denta (DEN)

==== First to fourth place classification ====
===== Semi-finals =====
10 February 2018
16:30

Germany	6–2	Iran
Rühr 5', 12', 23'; Pehlke 7'; Häner 39'; Weinke 40'	Report	Taherirad 20'; Norouzzadeh 35'

Umpires:
Bart de Liefde (NED)
Luis Martínez (ESP)

10 February 2018
18:00

Australia	1–2	Austria
Knee 24'	Report	Körper 20', 31'

Umpires:
Ben Göntgen (GER)
Aliaksandr Hrachou (BLR)

===== Third and fourth place =====
11 February 2018
12:00

Iran	5–0	Australia
Taherirad 14'; Norouzzadeh 19', 40', 40'; Nooranian 31'	Report

Umpires:
Ben Göntgen (GER)
Luis Martínez (ESP)

===== Final =====
11 February 2018
15:00

Germany	3–3	Austria
Häner 6'; Zwicker 8'; Rühr 26'	Report	Uher 9'; Körper 33', 39'
Penalties
Hauke (penalty shoot-out missed); Miltkau (penalty shoot-out scored); Rühr (penalty shoot-out scored); Rühr (penalty shoot-out missed); Hauke (penalty shoot-out missed)	2–3	(penalty shoot-out missed) Eitenberger; (penalty shoot-out scored) Unterkircher; (penalty shoot-out scored) Körper; (penalty shoot-out missed) Eitenberger; (penalty shoot-out scored) Körper

Umpires:
Pawel Linkowski (POL)
Adam Barry (AUS)

== Final standings ==
Rank	Team
Gold medal	Austria
Silver medal	Germany
Bronze medal	Iran
4	Australia
5	Czech Republic
6	Poland
7	Belgium
8	Switzerland
9	Russia
10	Trinidad and Tobago
11	South Africa
12	Kazakhstan

== Awards ==
Top Goalscorer	Player of the Tournament	Goalkeeper of the Tournament	Rising Player of the Tournament
(Germany) Christopher Rühr	(Germany) Christopher Rühr	(Iran) Sasan Hataminejad	(Austria) Fabian Unterkirchen

== Goalscorers ==
There were 306 goals scored in 40 matches, for an average of 7.65 goals per match.

19 goals

- (Germany) Christopher Rühr

17 goals

- (Austria) Michael Körper

16 goals

- (Iran) Reza Norouzzadeh

11 goals

- (Germany) Marco Miltkau

10 goals

- (Czech Republic) Jakub Kyndl

9 goals

- (Australia) Jack Hayes
- (Poland) Philipp Weide

8 goals

- (Russia) Mikhail Proskuriakov

7 goals

- (Germany) Mats Grambusch
- (Germany) Fabian Pehlke

6 goals

- (Austria) Benjamin Stanzl
- (Belgium) Tom Boon
- (Iran) Navid Taherirad
- (Poland) Tomasz Górny
- (Poland) Artur Mikula
- (Trinidad and Tobago) Akim Toussaint

5 goals

- (Austria) Dominic Uher
- (Belgium) Maxime Plennevaux
- (Czech Republic) Tomas Procházka
- (Czech Republic) David Vacek
- (Germany) Martin Häner
- (Kazakhstan) Daulet Urmanov
- (Russia) Pavel Golubev
- (South Africa) Matthew Fairweather
- (Switzerland) Yves Morard
- (Trinidad and Tobago) Mickell Pierre

4 goals

- (Australia) James Knee
- (Australia) Adam Seccull
- (Belgium) Gaetan Dykmans
- (Czech Republic) Martin Seemann
- (Trinidad and Tobago) Solomon Eccles

3 goals

- (Australia) Jake Sherren
- (Belgium) Tanguy Zimmer
- (Czech Republic) Lukas Plochý
- (Germany) Martin Zwicker
- (Kazakhstan) Nurbol Kozhym
- (Poland) Mateusz Poltaszewski
- (Russia) Anton Kornilov
- (South Africa) Jethro Eustice

2 goals

- (Australia) Troy Sutherland
- (Austria) Sebastian Eitenberger
- (Belgium) Tom Degroote
- (Germany) Tobias Hauke
- (Iran) Behdad Beiranvand
- (Iran) Hamid Nooranian
- (Kazakhstan) Yermek Tashkeyev
- (Poland) Pawel Bratkowski
- (Poland) Michal Kasprzyk
- (Poland) Krystian Makowski
- (Russia) Ilfat Zamalutdinov
- (South Africa) Jarryd Jones
- (South Africa) Reza Rosenberg
- (Switzerland) Florian Feller
- (Trinidad and Tobago) Kristien Emmanuel
- (Trinidad and Tobago) Jordan Reynos
- (Trinidad and Tobago) Jordan Vieira

1 goal

- (Australia) Aidan Campbell
- (Australia) Luke Noblett
- (Australia) Heath Ogilvie
- (Australia) Thomas Sinclair
- (Austria) Alexander Bele
- (Austria) Xaver Hasun
- (Austria) Florian Steyrer
- (Belgium) Cédric Charlier
- (Czech Republic) Tomas Jahoda
- (Germany) Alexander Otte
- (Germany) Ferdinand Weinke
- (Iran) Abbas Aroei
- (Iran) Mohammad Asnaashari
- (Iran) Mohsen Bohlouli
- (Iran) Behnam Sadi
- (Kazakhstan) Yerkebulan Dyussebekov
- (Kazakhstan) Tilek Uzbek
- (Poland) Karol Majchrzak
- (Poland) Bartosz Zywiczka
- (Russia) Aleksandr Agafontsev
- (Russia) Dmitrii Kuraev
- (Russia) Iaroslav Loginov
- (South Africa) Ryan Julius
- (South Africa) Mohamed Mea
- (South Africa) Wade Paton
- (Switzerland) Martin Greder
- (Switzerland) Manuel Keller
- (Trinidad and Tobago) Aidan de Gannes
- (Trinidad and Tobago) Shaquille Daniel

Source: FIH

== See also ==
- 2018 Women's Indoor Hockey World Cup
