= 2017 Men's African Hockey Indoor Cup of Nations =

Tournament details
- Host country: Namibia
- City: Swakopmund
- Dates: 23 –25 June 2017
- Teams: 3
- Venue: The Dome

Final positions
- Champions: South Africa (1st title)
- Runner-up: Namibia
- Third place: Zimbabwe

Tournament statistics
- Top scorer: (South Africa) Keagan Robinson (7 goals)
- Best player: (Namibia) Brynn Cleak
- Best goalkeeper: (Namibia) David Strauss

The 2017 Men's African Hockey Indoor Cup of Nations was held in Swakopmund, Namibia from 23–25 June 2017. The competition featured three teams, an increase from 2013 as Zimbabwe featured for the first time ever. South Africa defeated Namibia in the final and secured a place in the 2018 Men's Indoor Hockey World Cup.

== Participating nations ==
Three countries participated in this years tournament:

- South Africa
- Namibia
- Zimbabwe

== Umpires ==
- Lee Barron (England)
- Peter Caulder (South Africa)
- Sedric Makati (Namibia)
- Munashe Mashoko (Zimbabwe)
- Gary Simmonds - Umpire Manager (South Africa)

== Squads ==
=== South Africa ===
Head coach: Pierre le Roux

No.	Name	Caps
2	Matthew Fairweather (c)	19
3	Chris McCathie (GK)	15
4	Richard Curtis (GK)	15
5	Justin Domleo	18
8	Wade Paton	5
15	Mohamed Mea	16
19	Robin Jones	5
21	Jethro Eustice	5
23	Keagan Robinson	5
26	Reza Rosenberg	5
27	Ryan Julius	10
28	Rusten Abrahams	5

=== Namibia ===
Head coach: Trevor Cormack

No.	Name	Caps
1	David Strauss (GK)	12
2	Nicolaas Jacobs	3
3	Isascar Tjikuniva	10
5	Pieter Jacobs	13
9	Russel Bartlett (C)	8
11	Siyabonga Martins	10
12	Percy Barthram	3
13	Dakota Hansen	5
14	Tarrant Butcher	8
15	Liam Hermanus	5
16	Brynn Cleak	5
20	Jacobus Coetzee (GK)	3

=== Zimbabwe ===
Head Coach: Edward Chiringah

No.	Name	Caps
1	Isheanesu Marima (GK)	4
2	Takunda Chipumha	3
3	Gift Chomunorwa	3
4	Tendayi Maredza (c)	4
5	Edwin Tholanah	4
6	Kanyiwe Tafuma	4
7	Tapiwa Mushayakarara	4
8	Pritchard Matambo	4
9	Luckson Sikisa	4
10	Kudzanai Tembo	4
11	Constantine Muchono	4
12	Kudzai Chimbetete (GK)	1

== Results ==
All times are in West Africa Time (UTC+02:00).

=== Round robin ===
Pos	Team	Pld	W	D	L	GF	GA	GD	Pts	Qualification
1	South Africa	4	3	1	0	34	6	+28	10	Advance to Final
2	Namibia (H)	4	2	1	1	20	19	+1	7	Advance to Final
3	Zimbabwe	4	0	0	4	9	38	−29	0	

Source: FIH
Rules for classification: 1) points; 2) goal difference; 3) goals scored; 4) head-to-head result.
(H) Hosts

23 June 2017
10:00

South Africa	10–2	Zimbabwe
Paton 16', 19', 19'; Robinson 30', 32', 34'; Domleo 33'; Rosenberg 34'; Fairweather 38'; Eustice 40'	Report	Maredza 14'; Tembo 14'

Umpires:
Lee Barron (ENG)
Sedric Makati (NAM)

23 June 2017
15:00

Namibia	3–3	South Africa
Cleak 15'; Jacobs 25'; Martins 27'	Report	Paton 3'; Julius 29'; Abrahams 40'

Umpires:
Lee Barron (ENG)
Munashe Mashoko (ZIM)

23 June 2017
20:00

Namibia	8–3	Zimbabwe
Bartlett 2', 13', 21'; Tjikuniva 6'; Martins 12'; Hansen 17'; Jacobs 33', 38'	Report	Maredza 14'; Tembo 22'; Tholanah 38'

Umpires:
Sedrik Makati (NAM)
Peter Caulder (RSA)

24 June 2017
10:00

South Africa	12–0	Zimbabwe
Julius 6', 7', 16', 26', 31'; Robinson 23', 24'; Fairweather 26'; Paton 29', 31'; Eustice 30'; Abrahams 39'	Report

Umpires:
Sedrik Makati (NAM)
Munashe Mashoko (ZIM)

24 June 2017
15:00

South Africa	9–1	Namibia
Eustice 3', 16'; Robinson 5', 38'; Abrahams 8', 22', 37'; Domleo 16'; Mea 33'	Report	Cleak 10'

Umpires:
Peter Caulder (RSA)
Lee Barron (ENG)

24 June 2017
20:00

Namibia	8–4	Zimbabwe
Tjikuniva 17', 19', 31', 35'; Hermanus 27', 32'; Martins 28'; Cleak 37'	Report	Sikisa 18'; Tafuma 29'; Maredza 35'; Tholanah 35'

Umpires:
Lee Barron (ENG)
Munashe Mashoko (ZIM)

=== Final ===
25 June 2017
10:00

Namibia	1–2	South Africa
Cleak 24'	Report	Rosenberg 1'; Domleo 16'

Umpires:
Lee Barron (ENG)
Munashe Mashoko (ZIM)

== Final standings ==
Qualified for 2018 Men's Indoor Hockey World Cup

Rank	Team
1	South Africa
2	Namibia
3	Zimbabwe

=== Awards ===
The following awards were given at the conclusion of the tournament.

Player of the tournament	Goalkeeper of the tournament	Top goalscorer
(Namibia) Brynn Cleak	(Namibia) David Strauss	(South Africa) Keagan Robinson

== Statistics ==
=== Goal Scorers ===
There have been 66 goals scored in 7 matches, for an average of 9.43 goals per match.

7 goals

- (South Africa) Keagan Robinson

6 goals

- (South Africa) Ryan Julius
- (South Africa) Wade Paton

5 goals

- (Namibia) Isascar Tjikuniva
- (South Africa) Rusten Abrahams

4 goals

- (Namibia) Brynn Cleak
- (South Africa) Jethro Eustice

3 goals

- (Namibia) Russel Bartlett
- (Namibia) Pieter Jacobs
- (Namibia) Siyabonga Martins
- (South Africa) Justin Domleo
- (Zimbabwe) Tendayi Maredza

2 goals

- (Namibia) Liam Hermanus
- (South Africa) Matthew Fairweather
- (South Africa) Reza Rosenberg
- (Zimbabwe) Kudzanai Tembo
- (Zimbabwe) Edwin Tholanah

1 goal

- (Namibia) Dakota Hansen
- (South Africa) Mohamed Mea
- (Zimbabwe) Luckson Sikisa
- (Zimbabwe) Kanyiwe Tafuma
Source: FIH

=== Cards ===
Player	Country	Red	Yellow	Green
Dakota Hansen	(Namibia)	0	1	2
Mohamed Mea	(South Africa)	0	1	0
Jethro Eustice	(South Africa)	0	0	1
Reza Rosenberg	(South Africa)	0	0	1
Rusten Abrahams	(South Africa)	0	1	1
Tendayi Mareda	(Zimbabwe)	0	0	2
Edwin Tholanah	(Zimbabwe)	0	1	0
Kanyiwe Tafuma	(Zimbabwe)	0	1	0
Pritchard Matambo	(Zimbabwe)	0	0	1
Total		0	5	8
