= 2018 Indoor Hockey World Cup =

2018 Indoor Hockey World Cup may refer to:

- 2018 Men's Indoor Hockey World Cup
- 2018 Women's Indoor Hockey World Cup
