= 2024 Men's Indoor Africa Cup =

Indoor hockey tournament

2021 Men's Indoor Africa Cup

Tournament details
- Host country: Namibia
- City: Swakopmund
- Dates: 23–26 May
- Teams: 4 (from 1 confederation)
- Venue: The Dome

Final positions
- Champions: Namibia (1st title)
- Runner-up: South Africa
- Third place: Zimbabwe

Tournament statistics
- Matches played: 8
- Goals scored: 40 (5 per match)
- Top scorer: (South Africa) Mustapha Cassiem (10 goals)
- Best player: (Namibia) Pieter Jacobs
- Best goalkeeper: (South Africa) Cullin De Jager

The 2024 Men's Indoor Africa Cup was held in Swakopmund, Namibia from 23 to 26 May 2024.

Namabia won their first title after defeating the defending champions South Africa in the final 4–3 in a shoot-out after the match finished 3–3 in regular time. The top two teams qualified for the 2025 Men's FIH Indoor Hockey World Cup.

== Teams ==
The following four teams participated in the tournament:

~~Botswana~~
Namibia
1. David Strauss (GK)
3. Roben Kambinda (GK)
5. Liam Hermanus
6. David Britz
7. Fagan Hansen
8. John-Paul Britz
9. Cody van der Merwe
10. Nico Neethling
12. Dakota Hansen
13. Pieter Jacobs (C)
15. Owen Hatton
19. Brynn Cleak
South Africa

Head Coach: Justin Rosenberg

2. Mustapha Cassiem
5. Justin Domleo
6. Hans Neethling
7. Dayaan Cassiem (C)
10. Keegan Hezlett
15. Nicholas White
16. Dalpiarro Langford
18. Idrees Abdulla
21. Jethro Eustice
23. Bongumusa Mngoma (GK)
25. Leruo Ditlhakanyane
30. Cullin De Jager (GK)
Zimbabwe

Head Coach: Antonio Five

1. Mike Gumbura
2. Tinotendaishe Muzamwese
3. Gift Chomunorwa
5. Forbes Thindwa
6. Constantine Muchono
8. Tadiwanashe Kamusewu
10. Tendayi Maredza
17. Kevin January
24. Kudzanai Tembo (C)
29. Kudzai Chimbetete (GK)

== Preliminary round ==
=== Standings ===
All times are local (UTC+2).

The pools were announced on 2 May 2024.

Pos	Team	Pld	W	D	L	GF	GA	GD	Pts	Qualification
1	South Africa	3	3	0	0	22	4	+18	9	Final and 2025 World Cup
2	Namibia (H)	3	2	0	1	21	6	+15	6	Final and 2025 World Cup
3	Zimbabwe	3	1	0	2	6	24	−18	3	Third place match
4	Botswana (Note: Due to the delayed arrival of the Botswana Teams, in accordance with FIH Tournament Regulations for Indoor Competitions have been disqualified from the Indoor Africa Cup 2024.)	3	0	0	3	0	15	−15	0	Disqualified

Source: FIH
Rules for classification: 1) points; 2) matches won; 3) goal difference; 4) goals for; 5) head-to-head result; 6) field goals for.
(H) Hosts
Notes:

23 May 2024
17:00

South Africa	5–0 (Note: The match resulted in a walkover, after the Botswana team arrived late and did not made it in time for the game.)	Botswana
	Report

Umpires:
Siyabonga Martins (NAM)
Tawedzegwa Chadenga (ZIM)

23 May 2024
20:00

Namibia	12–1	Zimbabwe
Hansen 5', 28'; Van der Merwe 12', 14'; Hatton 16'; Hermanus 17', 34'; JP Britz 18'; D. Britz 31'; Hansen 32', 40'; Cleak 35'	Report	Thindwa 20'

Umpires:
Ayden Shrives (RSA)
Mark Becholz (NED)

24 May 2024
18:30

Botswana	0–5	Zimbabwe
	Report

Umpires:
Tawedzegwa Chadenga (ZIM)
Mark Becholz (NED)

24 May 2024
20:00

Namibia	4–5	South Africa
JP Britz 31'; Hansen 33', 34'; Van der Merwe 40'	Report	Eustice 2'; M. Cassiem 9', 14', 20', 21'

Umpires:
Ayden Shrives (RSA)
Siyabonga Martins (NAM)

25 May 2024
11:00

South Africa	12–0	Zimbabwe
Hezlett 12', 24'; M. Cassiem 15', 16', 17', 23'; D. Cassiem 21'; Langford 25', 34'; Neethling 26'; Abdulla 29'; Eustice 31'	Report

Umpires:
Tawedzegwa Chadenga (ZIM)
Mark Becholz (NED)

25 May 2024
15:30

Botswana	0–5	Namibia
	Report

== First to fourth place classification ==
=== Third and fourth place ===
26 May 2024
14:00

Zimbabwe	5–0	Botswana
	Report

=== Final ===
26 May 2024
17:00

South Africa	3–3	Namibia
M. Cassiem 23', 36'; Langford 24'	Report	Hansen 28', 30+'; Van der Merwe 37'
Penalties
D. Cassiem (penalty shoot-out scored); M. Cassiem (penalty shoot-out scored); Eustice (penalty shoot-out missed); M. Cassiem (penalty shoot-out scored); D. Cassiem (penalty shoot-out missed)	3–4	(penalty shoot-out scored) Van der Merwe; (penalty shoot-out scored) JP Britz; (penalty shoot-out missed) Cleak; (penalty shoot-out scored) JP Britz; (penalty shoot-out scored) Van der Merwe

Umpires:
Siyabonga Martins (NAM)
Mark Becholz (NED)

== Statistics ==
=== Final standings ===
Pos	Team	Qualification
1st place, gold medalist(s)	Namibia (H)	2025 Indoor Hockey World Cup
2nd place, silver medalist(s)	South Africa	2025 Indoor Hockey World Cup
3rd place, bronze medalist(s)	Zimbabwe	

Source: FIH
(H) Host

=== Awards ===
The following awards were given at the conclusion of the tournament.

Player of the tournament	Goalkeeper of the tournament	Top goalscorer
(Namibia) Pieter Jacobs	(South Africa) Cullin De Jager	(South Africa) Mustapha Cassiem

=== Goalscorers ===
There were 40 goals scored in 8 matches, for an average of 5 goals per match.

10 goals

- (South Africa) Mustapha Cassiem

6 goals

- (Namibia) Fagan Hansen

4 goals

- (Namibia) Cody van der Merwe

3 goals

- (South Africa) Dalpiarro Langford

2 goals

- (Namibia) John-Paul Britz
- (Namibia) Dakota Hansen
- (Namibia) Liam Hermanus
- (South Africa) Jethro Eustice
- (South Africa) Keegan Hezlett

1 goal

- (Namibia) David Britz
- (Namibia) Brynn Cleak
- (Namibia) Owen Hatton
- (South Africa) Idrees Abdulla
- (South Africa) Dayaan Cassiem
- (South Africa) Hans Neethling
- (Zimbabwe) Forbes Thindwa

Source: FIH

== See also ==
- 2024 Women's Indoor Africa Cup
