= Jack Hayes (field hockey) =

Australian field hockey player

Personal information
- Full name: Jack Peter Hayes
- Born: 30 March 1994 (age 32) Albion Park, New South Wales
- Height: 183 cm (6 ft 0 in)

Sport
- Sport: Field hockey
- Position: Midfielder/Attacker
Senior career
Years	Team	Caps	Goals
2014–	NSW Waratahs	32	10
National team
Years	Team	Caps	Goals
2018–	Australia Indoor	8	(9)
2019–	Australia	4	(0)
Medal record
Men's field hockey
Representing Australia

Jack Hayes (born 30 March 1994) is an Australian field hockey player.

== Personal life ==
Hayes grew up in Albion Park, New South Wales.

Hayes comes from a large sporting family, with cousins Casey Sablowski a former member of the Hockeyroos, and Ryan Gregson a 1500-metre record holder.

== Career ==
=== Indoor National Team ===
In 2018, Hayes was a member of the Australian team at the 2018 Indoor World Cup, where the team finished in fourth place. Hayes was Australia's highest scorer, netting 9 goals throughout the campaign.

=== Senior National Team ===
After spending 3 years in the National Development Squad, Hayes was raised to the Kookaburras squad in November 2019.

Hayes made his debut for Australia in February 2019, in an FIH Pro League match against Germany in Hobart.
