= Cöthener Hockeyclub =

German sports club

Cöthener HC
- Full name: Cöthener Hockeyclub 02 e.V.
- Nickname(s): CHC 02
- League: 2. Bundesliga (Indoor) Mitteldeutsche Oberliga (Outdoor)
- Founded: 1902; 123 years ago
- Home ground: Sparkassenarena am Ratswall, Köthen (Anhalt)

Personnel
- Manager: Detlef Zwicker
- Website: www.chc02.de
Home	Away

Cöthener Hockeyclub 02, commonly known as CHC 02, is a German sports club based in Köthen, Sachsen-Anhalt.

The CHC has a long tradition, which started in 1902, when the club was founded. In 1945, the occupation force (Soviet Union) ordered a merger of the sport clubs in Köthen, so the CHC joined the "Sportgemeinschaft Köthen-West" (Sportunion Köthen-West). In 1950 they founded a "Betriebssportgruppe" (Works team) named "BSG Union Köthen", where they played football, hockey and handball. After the reunion of Germany, the hockey players of the "BSG Union Köthen" separated from the works team and assumed the traditional name CHC 02. The club had 25 DDR (East Germany) internationals and won 14 times the "DDR-Meisterschaft" (East German championship). In the moment there is only one player, who is born in Köthen, on the Germany men's national field hockey team (Martin Zwicker) and one player in the national under-21 team, but both play at the time for other clubs.
