= Mustapha Cassiem =

South African field hockey player

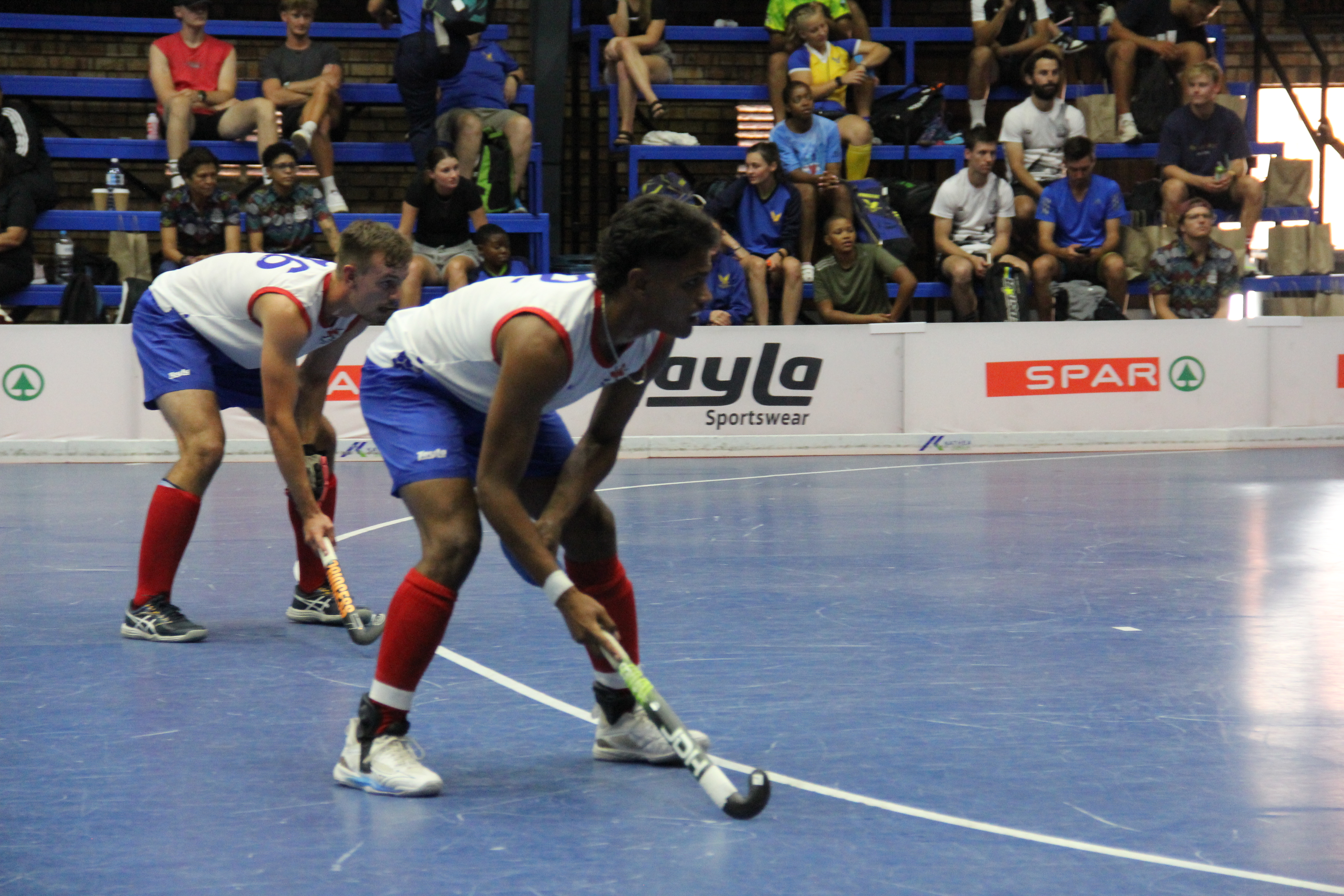
- 2024 - Indoor IPT Men's A-Section: Western Province v Southern Gauteng
- Born: 19 March 2002 (age 24)
- Education: Bishops Diocesan College
- Father: Abdullah “Casa” Cassiem
- Family: Dayaan Cassiem (brother)
- Field hockey career
- Sport: Field hockey
- Position: Forward
- Club: AH&BC
Youth career
- Years: Team
- 2017-2018: Western Province U16
- 2019: Western Province U18
Senior career
| Years | Team | Caps | Goals |
| 2019-present | Western Province | - | - |
| 2019 | Mapungubwe Mambas | 7 | - |
| -2021 | Varsity College | - | - |
| 2022–2023 | Gladbacher HTC | - | - |
| 2023-2024 | HDM | - | - |
| 2024–present | AH&BC | - | - |
National team
| Years | Team | Caps | Goals |
| 2018 | South Africa u18 | 5 | (2) |
| 2019–present | South Africa (indoor) | 53 | (139) |
| 2020–present | South Africa | 66 | (31) |
Medal record
Representing South Africa
Men's field hockey
Africa Cup of Nations
| Gold medal – first place | 2025 Ismailia |
African Youth Games
| Gold medal – first place | 2018 Algiers |
Men's indoor hockey
FIH Indoor World Cup
| Bronze medal – third place | 2025 Poreč |
Indoor Africa Cup
| Gold medal – first place | 2021 Durban |
| Silver medal – second place | 2024 Swakopmund |
- Updated on 17 December 2025

Mustapha Cassiem (born 19 March 2002) is a South African field hockey player who plays as a forward for the South African national team.

His brother Dayaan also is a forward for the national hockey team.

== International career ==
He made South Africa U–18 as the African Youth Games in 2018.

Cassiem made his debut for the outdoor South African national team in February 2020 in a test match against the United States. He was part of the South African team that competed in the 2020 Summer Olympics. In August 2021 he was nominated for the FIH Rising Star of the Year at the FIH Hockey Stars Awards 2020–21.

== Honours ==
=== Club ===
==== Western Province Hockey ====
- 2018 U16 Boys Hockey Nationals (A Section) – Leading Goalscorer
- 2024 Men's Indoor Inter-Provincial Tournament – Leading Goalscorer
- 2025 Men's Inter-Provincial Tournament – Leading Goalscorer and Player of the Tournament

==== Mpumalanga Mambas ====
- 2019 PHL Men - Young Player of the Tournament

==== HDM ====
- 2024 Men's EuroHockey Indoor Club Cup – Player of the tournament

=== South Africa U21 ===
- 2022 Senior IPT Men - A Section - Top Goalscorer
- 2023 Senior IPT Men - A Section - Top Goalscorer and Player of the Tournament

=== South Africa ===
- 2023 FIH Hockey World Cup - JSP Foundation Best Junior Player of the Tournament

=== South Africa (indoor) ===
- 2023 Men's FIH Indoor Hockey World Cup – Best Junior Player
- 2023 Nkosi Cup – Top Goal scorer, Player of the Tournament
- 2024 South Africa Indoor Hockey Players of the Year
- 2024 Indoor Africa Cup – Leading Goalscorer
- 2023 Nkosi Cup – Top Goal scorer
- 2025 Men's FIH Indoor Hockey World Cup – Player of the Tournament
- 2025 South Africa Indoor Hockey Players of the Year
- 2023 Nkosi Cup – Top Goal scorer, Player of the Tournament
