= 2021 Men's Indoor Africa Cup =

Indoor hockey tournament

Tournament details
- Host country: South Africa
- City: Durban
- Dates: 16–18 April
- Teams: 3 (from 1 confederation)
- Venue: Thomas Moore College

Final positions
- Champions: South Africa (2nd title)
- Runner-up: Namibia
- Third place: Botswana

Tournament statistics
- Matches played: 7
- Goals scored: 156 (22.29 per match)
- Top scorer: (Namibia) Fagan Hansen (24 goals)
- Best player: (South Africa) Dayaan Cassiem

The 2021 Men's Indoor Africa Cup was held in Durban, South Africa. It was originally scheduled from 25 to 27 September 2020, but was postponed due to the COVID-19 pandemic. On 30 December 2020 it was announced the tournament was rescheduled to be held from 16 to 18 April 2021.

The competition featured three teams, with the winner securing a place in the 2022 Men's FIH Indoor Hockey World Cup. The hosts and defending champions South Africa won the title by defeating Namibia 4–1 in the final.

== Teams ==
Botswana
1. Katlo Busang (C)
4. Katlego Keerate
5. Kamogelo Lesaka
8. Thoriso Bogwasi
9. Ronan Andrews
10. Tefo Matobolo
11. Thabile Molefe
13. Jairus Jairus (GK)
14. Tumelo Sekate
15. Floyd Molebo
16. Conrad Benn
18. Tlotla Ponoesele
Namibia
1. David Strauss (GK)
2. Richter van Rooyen (GK)
3. John-Paul Britz
4. Owen Hatton
5. Liam Hermanus
6. David Britz
7. Brynn Cleak
8. Fagan Hansen
9. Cody van der Merwe
10. Nico Neethling
12. Dakota Hansen
13. Pieter Jacobs
South Africa
1. Anton van Loggerenberg (GK)
2. Mustapha Cassiem
5. Justin Domleo
7. Dayaan Cassiem
8. Steven Paulo
9. Lungani Gabela
11. Daniel Sibbald
17. Rusten Abrahams
18. Chad Futcher
21. Jethro Eustice (C)
23. Bongumusa Mngoma (GK)
27. Aiden Tun

== Results ==
=== Standings ===
Pos	Team	Pld	W	D	L	GF	GA	GD	Pts	Qualification
1	South Africa (H)	4	4	0	0	81	6	+75	12	Final
2	Namibia	4	2	0	2	70	15	+55	6	Final
3	Botswana	4	0	0	4	0	130	−130	0	

Source: FIH
Rules for classification: 1) points; 2) matches won; 3) goal difference; 4) goals for; 5) head-to-head result; 6) field goals scored.
(H) Hosts

=== Fixtures ===
All times are local (UTC+2).

16 April 2021
10:30

Namibia	27–0	Botswana
Hermanus 3', 3', 13', 15', 21', 39'; Cleak 3', 12', 12', 14', 37', 37'; F. Hansen 7', 9', 10', 18', 20', 20', 25', 27', 29', 30', 34'; J. Britz 10'; Jacobs 12'; Hatton 17'; Van der Merwe 35'	Report

Umpires:
Peter Caulder (RSA)
Lefika Bulala (BOT)

16 April 2021
14:30

South Africa	36–0	Botswana
M. Cassiem 1', 3', 5', 5', 15', 26', 27', 38'; D. Cassiem 4', 28', 30', 36', 39', 40'; Gabela 6', 17', 20', 25', 33'; Domleo 12'; Eustice 13', 30', 30', 37', 40'; Sibbald 16', 38'; Paulo 18', 20', 23'; Tun 19'; Futcher 20', 22', 24', 26', 36'	Report

Umpires:
Lefika Bulala (BOT)
Llewellyn Sonie (RSA)

16 April 2021
19:30

South Africa	6–3	Namibia
Domleo 8'; D. Cassiem 19'; Futcher 22'; M. Cassiem 23', 32'; Paulo 37'	Report	Hermanus 15', 34'; Hatton 29'

Umpires:
Bryn Lowe (ZIM)
Peter Caulder (RSA)

17 April 2021
10:30

Botswana	0–37	Namibia
	Report	D. Hansen 2'; Hermanus 2', 3', 13', 14', 23', 35'; J. Britz 4', 28', 29', 37', 38'; Van der Merwe 5', 11', 15', 21', 23'; F. Hansen 7', 9', 18', 19', 20', 26', 27', 36', 39', 40', 40'; Neethling 7', 26'; Cleak 8', 10', 25', 34'; Jacobs 16'; D. Britz 17', 28'

Umpires:
Llewellyn Sonie (RSA)
Peter Caulder (RSA)

17 April 2021
14:30

Botswana	0–30	South Africa
	Report	Futcher 4', 16', 26', 32', 39'; Abrahams 4', 34', 40'; M. Cassiem 6', 8', 19', 22', 29', 36'; D. Cassiem 7', 11', 14', 24', 35'; Eustice 7', 23', 37'; Domleo 11', 13'; Sibbald 12', 38'; Gabela 24', 28', 32'; Tun 27'

Umpires:
Claire Cowan (RSA)
Bryn Lowe (ZIM)

17 April 2021
19:30

Namibia	3–9	South Africa
F. Hansen 4', 26'; J. Britz 38'	Report	D. Cassiem 7', 35', 36', 37'; M. Cassiem 17'; Gabela 20', 40'; Futcher 21', 33'

Umpires:
Peter Caulder (RSA)
Llewellyn Sonie (RSA)

=== Final ===
18 April 2021
16:00

South Africa	4–1	Namibia
M. Cassiem 18'; Futcher 24', 32'; Eustice 25'	Report	Hansen 12'

Umpires:
Peter Caulder (RSA)
Llewellyn Sonie (RSA)

== Statistics ==
=== Final standings ===
Rank	Team
1st place, gold medalist(s)	South Africa
2nd place, silver medalist(s)	Namibia
3rd place, bronze medalist(s)	Botswana

Qualified for the 2022 Men's FIH Indoor Hockey World Cup

=== Awards ===
The following awards were given at the conclusion of the tournament.

Player of the tournament	Goalkeeper of the tournament	Top goalscorer
(South Africa) Dayaan Cassiem	(South Africa) Bongumusa Mngoma	(Namibia) Fagan Hansen

=== Goalscorers ===
There were 156 goals scored in 7 matches, for an average of 22.3 goals per match.

24 goals

- (Namibia) Fagan Hansen

18 goals

- (South Africa) Mustaphaa Cassiem

16 goals

- (South Africa) Dayaan Cassiem

15 goals

- (South Africa) Chad Futcher

14 goals

- (Namibia) Liam Hermanus

10 goals

- (Namibia) Brynn Cleak
- (South Africa) Lungani Gabela

9 goals

- (South Africa) Jethro Eustice

7 goals

- (Namibia) John-Paul Britz

6 goals

- (Namibia) Cody van der Merwe

4 goals

- (South Africa) Justin Domleo
- (South Africa) Steven Paulo
- (South Africa) Daniel Sibbald

3 goals

- (South Africa) Rusten Abrahams

2 goals

- (Namibia) David Britz
- (Namibia) Dakota Hansen
- (Namibia) Owen Hatton
- (Namibia) Nico Neethling
- (Namibia) Pieter Jacobs
- (South Africa) Aiden Tun

Source: FIH

== See also ==
- 2021 Women's Indoor Africa Cup
