= Martin Häner =

German field hockey player (born 1988)

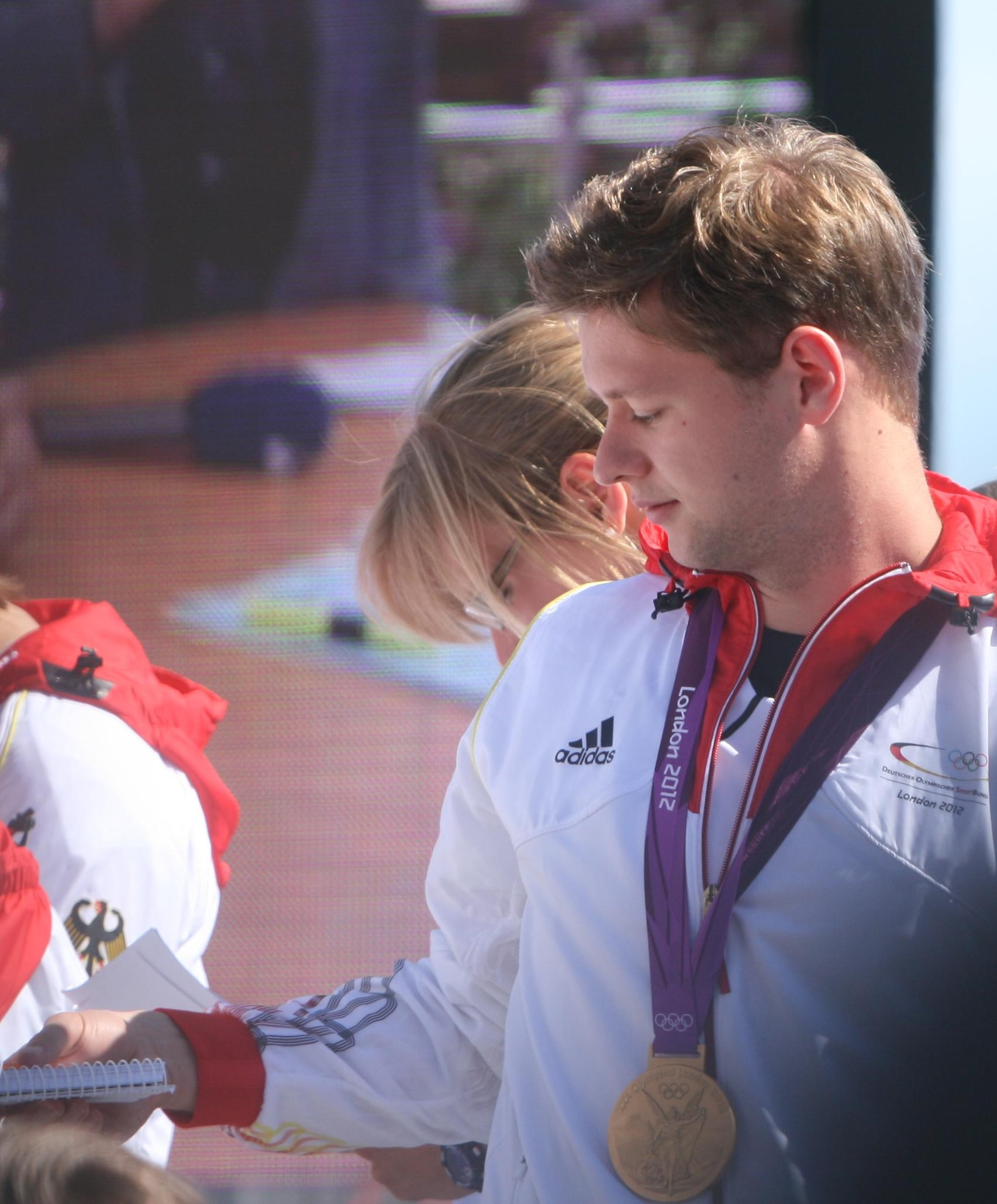

Personal information
- Full name: Martin Dominik Häner
- Born: 27 August 1988 (age 37) Berlin, Germany
- Height: 1.84 m (6 ft 0 in)
- Weight: 83 kg (183 lb)

Sport
- Sport: Field hockey
- Position: Defender / Midfielder
- Club: Berliner HC
Senior career
Years	Team	Caps	Goals
–	Steglitz TK	-	-
–	Berliner SC	-	-
–	Berliner HC	-	-
–	East Grinstead	-	-
–	Berliner HC	-	-
National team
Years	Team	Caps	Goals
2005–2021	Germany	272	(35)
Medal record
Representing Germany
Men's field hockey
Olympic Games
Gold medal – first place	2012 London	Team
Bronze medal – third place	2016 Rio de Janeiro	Team
World Cup
Silver medal – second place	2010 New Delhi
EuroHockey Championship
Gold medal – first place	2011 Mönchengladbach
Gold medal – first place	2013 Boom
Silver medal – second place	2009 Amstelveen
Silver medal – second place	2015 London
Silver medal – second place	2021 Amstelveen
Champions Trophy
Silver medal – second place	2009 Melbourne
Bronze medal – third place	2016 London
Junior World Cup
Gold medal – first place	2009 Johor Bahru & Singapore
Men's indoor hockey
Indoor World Cup
Silver medal – second place	2018 Berlin

Martin Dominik Häner (born 27 August 1988) is a German former field hockey player who played as a defender or midfielder for the German national team.

== Career ==
Häner made his debut for the German national team in 2005. At the 2012 Summer Olympics, he competed for the national team in the men's tournament, where they won the gold medal and the 2016 Olympics where Germany won bronze. On 28 May 2021, he was named in the squad for the 2021 EuroHockey Championship and the 2020 Summer Olympics. He scored four goals in the tournament as they won the silver medal after they lost the final to the Netherlands after a shoot-out. After the 2020 Summer Olympics he retired from playing hockey.
