= Field hockey at the 2018 African Youth Games – Boys' tournament =

2018 African Youth Games – Boys' tournament
Tournament details
- Host country: Algeria
- City: Algiers
- Dates: 19–26 July
- Teams: 7
- Venue: Stade Ferhani

Final positions
- Champions: South Africa (1st title)
- Runner-up: Zambia
- Third place: Kenya

Tournament statistics
- Matches played: 18
- Goals scored: 83 (4.61 per match)
- Top scorer: (South Africa) Peter Jarvis (12 goals)

The boys' hockey5s event at the 2018 African Youth Games in Algiers was held at the Stade Ferhani from 19 to 26 July 2018. The tournament served as a direct qualifier for the 2018 Summer Youth Olympics, with the winner and runner-up qualifying.

== Qualified teams ==
- Algeria
- Kenya
- Namibia
- Nigeria
- South Africa
- ~~Uganda~~
- Zambia
- Zimbabwe

Uganda was supposed to play in Pool B, but withdrew due to a lack of funds.

== Format ==
The eight teams will be split into two groups of four teams. All teams move on to the quarterfinals, and depending on their positions within the pool, they will be playing against a team from the other pool. In the quarterfinals, the four losing teams will be playing for the 5th to 8th place classification, whilst the four winning teams will move on to the semi-finals to determine the winner in a knock-out system.

== Preliminary round ==
All times are local (UTC+1).

=== Pool A ===
Pos	Team	Pld	W	D	L	GF	GA	GD	Pts
1	South Africa	3	3	0	0	20	0	+20	9
2	Namibia	3	2	0	1	9	8	+1	6
3	Zimbabwe	3	1	0	2	11	11	0	3
4	Algeria	3	0	0	3	1	22	−21	0

Source: FIH
Rules for classification: 1) points; 2) goal difference; 3) goals scored; 4) head-to-head result.

19 July 2018
12:00

South Africa	5–0	Namibia
Postumus 13'; Lewis 14', 19'; Maphumulo 17'; Jarvis 18'	Report

Umpires:
Shigeki Kodama (JPN)
Peter Kabaso (KEN)

19 July 2018
13:00

Zimbabwe	9–0	Algeria
Davis 3', 12'; Kamusewu 5', 11', 18'; Phiri 6', 7'; Mungore 8'; O'Riordan 19'	Report

Umpires:
Hisham Moaaz (EGY)
Kofi Quagraine (GHA)

20 July 2018
10:00

Zimbabwe	0–6	South Africa
	Report	Jarvis 1', 3', 13'; Wynford 7'; Cassiem 19'; Lewis 20'

Umpires:
Kofi Quagraine (GHA)
Peter Kabaso (KEN)

20 July 2018
11:00

Namibia	4–1	Algeria
van der Merwe 9' de Villiers 13'; Hansen 17'; McNally 20'	Report	Aichaoudi 5'

Umpires:
Simon Awasa (NGR)
Munashe Mashoko (ZIM)

21 July 2018
12:00

Namibia	5–2	Zimbabwe
Neethling 10+', 12'; Rieckert 13' van der Merwe 19' de Villiers 20'	Report	Kamusweu 9'; O'Riordan 16'

Umpires:
Simon Awasa (NGR)
Hisham Moaaz (EGY)

21 July 2018
13:00

South Africa	9–0	Algeria
Campbell 2'; Maphumulo 4', 12'; Jarvis 6', 7', 16', 19', 20'; Lewis 15'	Report

Umpires:
Haitham Selim (EGY)
Kofi Quagraine (GHA)

=== Pool B ===
Pos	Team	Pld	W	D	L	GF	GA	GD	Pts
1	Zambia	2	2	0	0	4	1	+3	6
2	Nigeria	2	1	0	1	2	3	−1	3
3	Kenya	2	0	0	2	2	4	−2	0

Source: FIH
Rules for classification: 1) points; 2) goal difference; 3) goals scored; 4) head-to-head result.

19 July 2018
16:00

Kenya	1–2	Zambia
Omutekete 14'	Report	Bwali 5'; Mulenga 19'

Umpires:
Gershwin Reid (RSA)
Shigeki Kodoma (JPN)

20 July 2018
12:00

Nigeria	2–1	Kenya
John 2'; Usman 10'	Report	Ludiali 10'

Umpires:
Haitham Selim (EGY)
Gershwin Reid (RSA)

21 July 2018
11:00

Zambia	2–0	Nigeria
Mulenga 3'; Mubanga 4'	Report

Umpires:
Shigeki Kodama (JPN)
Munashe Mashoko (ZIM)

== Knockout stage ==
=== Bracket ===
Fifth place
Zimbabwe (PSO)	1 (2)
Namibia	1 (0)

5–7th place semifinal
Zimbabwe
Namibia	1
Algeria	0

Quarterfinals
South Africa	–
–
Nigeria	1
Zimbabwe	0
Namibia	1
Kenya	3
Zambia	7
Algeria	0

Semifinals
South Africa	5
Nigeria	2
Kenya	1
Zambia	4

Final
South Africa (PSO)	1 (2)
Zambia	1 (0)
Third place
Nigeria	2
Kenya	3

=== Quarterfinals ===
23 July 2018
14:00

Namibia	1–3	Kenya
McNally 15'	Report	Ndwati 9'; Ndombi 10'; Ogenche 18'

Umpires:
Hisham Moaaz (EGY)
Kofi Quagraine (GHA)

23 July 2018
15:00

Nigeria	1–0	Zambia
Usman 4'	Report

Umpires:
Gershwin Reid (RSA)
Haitham Selim (EGY)

23 July 2018
16:00

Zambia	7–0	Algeria
Mulenga 4'; Bwali 6', 15', 20'; Moyo 7'; Kapeso 13'; Mubanga 17'	Report

Umpires:
Munashe Mashoko (ZIM)
Simon Awasa (NGA)

=== 5–7th place semifinal ===
24 July 2018
11:00

Namibia	1–0	Algeria
McNally 18'	Report

Umpires:
Kofi Quagraine (GHA)
Haitham Selim (EGY)

=== Fifth place game ===
25 July 2018
13:00

Zimbabwe	1–1	Namibia
Mungore 17'	Report	de Villiers 19'
Penalties
Davis (penalty shoot-out scored); Tugwete (penalty shoot-out scored)	2–0	(penalty shoot-out missed) Britz; (penalty shoot-out missed) Hatton

Umpires:
Hisham Moaaz(EGY)
Simon Awasa(NGR)

=== Semifinals ===
24 July 2018
15:00

South Africa	5–2	Nigeria
Jarvis 2', 7', 12'; Wynford 19'; Lewis 19'	Report	John 10', 18'

Umpires:
Peter Kabaso(KEN)
Munashe Mashoko(ZIM)

24 July 2018
16:00

Kenya	1–4	Zambia
Ouma 15'	Report	Mubanga 6', 9'; Bwali 16', 19'

Umpires:
Shigeki Kodama(JPN)
Gershwin Reid(RSA)

=== Third place game ===
26 July 2018
13:00

Nigeria	2–3	Kenya
John 11', 19'	Report	Wanganga 9', 19'; Ogenche 17'

Umpires:
Gershwin Reid(RSA)
Kofi Quagraine(GHA)

=== Final ===
26 July 2018
16:00

South Africa	1–1	Zambia
M. Cassiem 3'	Report	Moyo 7'
Penalties
Jarvis (penalty shoot-out missed); Wynford (penalty shoot-out scored); Cassiem (penalty shoot-out scored)	2–0	(penalty shoot-out missed) Bwali; (penalty shoot-out missed) Moyo

Umpires:
Peter Kabaso(KEN)
Hisham Moaaz(EGY)

== Final standings ==
Rank	Team
1st place, gold medalist(s)	South Africa
2nd place, silver medalist(s)	Zambia
3rd place, bronze medalist(s)	Kenya
4	Nigeria
5	Zimbabwe
6	Namibia
7	Algeria

Team qualified to the 2018 Summer Youth Olympics

== Goalscorers ==
There have been 83 goals scored in 18 matches, for an average of 4.61 goals per match.

12 goals

- (South Africa) Peter Jarvis

6 goals

- (Zambia) Phillimon Bwali

5 goals

- (Nigeria) Peter John
- (South Africa) Matthew Lewis

4 goals

- (Zambia) Joseph Mubanga
- (Zimbabwe) Tadiwanashe Kamusewu

3 goals

- (Namibia) Craig McNally
- (Namibia) Jan de Villiers
- (South Africa) Mpumelelo Maphumulo
- (Zambia) Dominic Mulenga

2 goals

- (Kenya) Brian Ogenche
- (Kenya) Richard Wanganga
- (Namibia) Nico Neethling
- (Namibia) Cody van der Merwe
- (Nigeria) Nathaniel Usman
- (South Africa) Mustaphaa Cassiem
- (South Africa) Luke Wynford
- (Zambia) Andrew Moyo
- (Zimbabwe) Sean Davis
- (Zimbabwe) Tatenda Mungore
- (Zimbabwe) Tony O'riordan
- (Zimbabwe) Joseph Phiri

1 goal

- (Algeria) Djamel Aichaoui
- (Kenya) Ivan Ludiali
- (Kenya) Edson Ndombi
- (Kenya) Bryton Ndwati
- (Kenya) Robinson Omutekete
- (Kenya) Olando Ouma
- (Namibia) Fagan Hansen
- (Namibia) Henco Rieckert
- (South Africa) Jared Campbell
- (South Africa) Cody Postumus
- (Zambia) David Kapeso

Source: FIH
