= 2025 Men's FIH Indoor Hockey World Cup =

Indoor hockey tournament in Croatia

Tournament details
- Host country: Croatia
- City: Poreč
- Dates: 3–9 February
- Teams: 12 (from 5 confederations)
- Venue: Žatika Sport Centre

Final positions
- Champions: Germany (4th title)
- Runner-up: Austria
- Third place: South Africa

Tournament statistics
- Matches played: 34
- Goals scored: 310 (9.12 per match)
- Top scorer: (Belgium) Philippe Simar (20 goals)
- Best player: (South Africa) Mustapha Cassiem
- Best young player: (Germany) Ben Hasbach
- Best goalkeeper: (Germany) Joshua Onyekwue Nnaji

The 2025 Men's FIH Indoor Hockey World Cup was the seventh edition of the Men's FIH Indoor Hockey World Cup, the international indoor hockey championship contested by the men's national teams of the member associations of the International Hockey Federation. It was held alongside the women's tournament at the Žatika Sport Centre in Poreč, Croatia from 3 to 9 February 2025.

Austria were the two-time defending champions after defeating the Netherlands in the 2023 final. They did not defend their title as they were beaten 2–1 in the final in a shoot-out by Germany, who won a record-extending fourth title, after the match finished 6–6 in regular time. South Africa won the bronze medal after defeating Belgium 6–5, it was the first medal for an African country at the Indoor World Cup.

== Qualification ==
The host qualified automatically and the top performers at each continental qualifications.

Dates	Event	Location	Quotas	Qualifier(s)
1–4 February 2024	2024 EuroHockey Championship	Leuven, Belgium	4	Austria; Belgium; Germany; Poland
18–22 March 2024	2024 Pan American Cup	Calgary, Canada	2	Argentina; Trinidad and Tobago
27 March 2024	Host nation	—N/a	1	Croatia
21–25 May 2024	2024 Asia Cup	Taldykorgan, Kazakhstan	2	Iran; Malaysia
23–26 May 2024	2024 Africa Cup	Swakopmund, Namibia	2	Namibia; South Africa
24–26 June 2024	2024 Oceania Indoor World Cup qualifier	Canberra, Australia	1	Australia
Total			12	

== First round ==
The eight highest ranked teams at the conclusion of the pool stage advanced to the quarter-finals, while the remaining four teams progressed to the classification round.

All times are local (UTC+1).

=== Pool A ===
Pos	Team	Pld	W	D	L	GF	GA	GD	Pts
1	Austria	3	3	0	0	18	10	+8	9
2	South Africa	3	2	0	1	19	16	+3	6
3	Poland	3	1	0	2	12	13	−1	3
4	Croatia (H)	3	0	0	3	10	20	−10	0

Source: FIH
Rules for classification: 1) points; 2) matches won; 3) goal difference; 4) goals for; 5) head-to-head result; 6) field goals scored.
(H) Hosts

3 February 2025
17:50

Austria	6–2	Poland
Losonci 7', 15', 32', 40'; Bele 18'; Unterkircher 37'	Report	Jarzyński 3'; Kurowski 9'

Umpires:
Pieter Hembrecht (NED)
Abby MacArthur (WAL)

3 February 2025
19:20

South Africa	8–6	Croatia
Neethling 6', 25', 33'; M. Cassiem 15', 22', 27', 37'; D. Cassiem 35'	Report	Mucić 2'; Bachmann 7', 10', 32', 38'; Fujs 39'

Umpires:
Michelle Meister (GER)
Salman (INA)

4 February 2025
17:00

South Africa	6–8	Austria
D. Cassiem 3'; M. Cassiem 4', 14', 26', 38'; Langford 23'	Report	Bele 4', 24'; Unterkircher 20', 35'; Losonci 26', 32', 37'; Eitenberger 30+'

Umpires:
Łukasz Zwierzchowski (POL)
Michael Pontus (BEL)

4 February 2025
18:20

Poland	8–2	Croatia
Pawlak 1'; Kurowski 24'; Bembenek 27'; Jarzyński 28', 37', 39', 40', 40'	Report	Mucić 29', 32'

Umpires:
Sean Edwards (ENG)
Melina Illanes (ARG)

6 February 2025
17:50

Poland	2–5	South Africa
Kurowski 10', 20'	Report	M. Cassiem 16', 23', 35'; Kraai 18'; Langford 19'

Umpires:
Sean Edwards (ENG)
Ana Ortega (ESP)

6 February 2025
19:00

Austria	4–2	Croatia
Unterkircher 12', 27'; Losonci 17', 35'	Report	Jazbec 2'; Krleža 35'

Umpires:
Emily Carroll (AUS)
Ben Göntgen (GER)

=== Pool B ===
Pos	Team	Pld	W	D	L	GF	GA	GD	Pts
1	Germany	3	3	0	0	28	9	+19	9
2	Iran	3	2	0	1	11	11	0	6
3	Argentina	3	1	0	2	10	15	−5	3
4	Malaysia	3	0	0	3	6	20	−14	0

Source: FIH
Rules for classification: 1) points; 2) matches won; 3) goal difference; 4) goals for; 5) head-to-head result; 6) field goals scored.

3 February 2025
08:30

Iran	5–3	Argentina
Nooranian 7', 9', 40'; Lashgari 19'; Mamizadeh 28'	Report	Navarro Guastelli 8'; Rodríguez 16'; González 36'

Umpires:
Sean Edwards (ENG)
Zeke Newman (AUS)

3 February 2025
09:30

Germany	12–4	Malaysia
Proske 2', 3', 27', 35'; Dösch 6'; Von Schwerin 20'; Hasbach 27', 30', 30', 36'; Böckel 37'; Silanoglu 40'	Report	Hamirin 4', 25'; Omar 11'; Jazlan 23'

Umpires:
Pieter Hembrecht (NED)
Salman (INA)

4 February 2025
09:30

Argentina	5–2	Malaysia
Rodríguez 17', 26'; Navarro Guastelli 19'; Sosa 39'; Ceballos 40'	Report	Suhaimi 12'; Jazlan 39'

Umpires:
Ben Göntgen (GER)
Ivona Makar (CRO)

4 February 2025
10:50

Germany	8–3	Iran
Dösch 6'; Von Schwerin 12', 38'; Hasbach 22', 29'; Schmid 26'; Proske 30', 33'	Report	Ghoreishiroudbaraki 8'; Mamizadeh 31'; Shahrokhi 37'

Umpires:
Rachel Williams (ENG)
Ayden Shrives (RSA)

5 February 2025
19:40

Iran	3–0	Malaysia
Ghoreishiroudbaraki 10'; Bohlouli 30'; Mamizadeh 36'	Report

Umpires:
Michelle Meister (GER)
Michael Pontus (BEL)

5 February 2025
21:00

Argentina	2–8	Germany
Rodríguez 26'; Eleicgui 39'	Report	Schmid 17', 36'; Hasbach 18', 30', 32', 33', 38'; Proske 40'

Umpires:
Zeke Newman (AUS)
Łukasz Zwierzchowski (POL)

=== Pool C ===
Pos	Team	Pld	W	D	L	GF	GA	GD	Pts
1	Belgium	3	3	0	0	21	9	+12	9
2	Australia	3	1	1	1	15	14	+1	4
3	Namibia	3	1	1	1	15	15	0	4
4	Trinidad and Tobago	3	0	0	3	7	20	−13	0

Source: FIH
Rules for classification: 1) points; 2) matches won; 3) goal difference; 4) goals for; 5) head-to-head result; 6) field goals scored.

3 February 2025
13:10

Belgium	7–4	Namibia
Magnant 4'; Simar 8', 11', 13'; Dykmans 34'; Langer 35'; Zimmer 40'	Report	D. Hansen 3'; J. Britz 4', 9'; Hermanus 15'

Umpires:
Ayden Shrives (RSA)
Łukasz Zwierzchowski (POL)

3 February 2025
14:20

Australia	7–2	Trinidad and Tobago
Miotto 3', 4'; Knee 9'; B. Staines 11'; Dooley 24', 25', 27'	Report	Marcano 23'; Daniel 35'

Umpires:
Michael Pontus (BEL)
Ivona Makar (CRO)

5 February 2025
09:30

Namibia	6–3	Trinidad and Tobago
Jacobs 13'; J. Britz 15', 34'; Van der Merwe 19'; D. Hansen 29'; Neethling 37'	Report	Singh 14'; Marcano 23'; Vieira 28'

Umpires:
Ben Göntgen (GER)
Kristy Robertson (AUS)

5 February 2025
10:50

Australia	3–7	Belgium
Dooley 4'; Knee 34'; Tuddenham 40'	Report	Simar 10', 16', 18', 22', 23', 28', 37'

Umpires:
Ana Ortega (ESP)
Pieter Hembrecht (NED)

6 February 2025
20:10

Belgium	7–2	Trinidad and Tobago
Simar 10', 28', 33', 39'; Dykmans 24'; Zimmer 39'; Magnant 40'	Report	Pierre 3', 26'

Umpires:
Kristy Robertson (AUS)
Rachel Williams (ENG)

6 February 2025
21:20

Namibia	5–5	Australia
F. Hansen 4'; D. Britz 26', 37'; J. Britz 35', 39'	Report	Gregory 10'; Dooley 14', 19'; J. Staines 33', 38'

Umpires:
Melina Illanes (ARG)
Michelle Meister (GER)

=== Ranking of teams ===
Pos	Team	Pld	W	D	L	GF	GA	GD	Pts	Qualification
1	Germany	3	3	0	0	28	9	+19	9	Quarter-finals
2	Belgium	3	3	0	0	21	9	+12	9	Quarter-finals
3	Austria	3	3	0	0	18	10	+8	9	Quarter-finals
4	South Africa	3	2	0	1	19	16	+3	6	Quarter-finals
5	Iran	3	2	0	1	11	11	0	6	Quarter-finals
6	Australia	3	1	1	1	15	14	+1	4	Quarter-finals
7	Namibia	3	1	1	1	15	15	0	4	Quarter-finals
8	Poland	3	1	0	2	12	13	−1	3	Quarter-finals
9	Argentina	3	1	0	2	10	15	−5	3	
10	Croatia (H)	3	0	0	3	10	20	−10	0	
11	Trinidad and Tobago	3	0	0	3	7	20	−13	0	
12	Malaysia	3	0	0	3	6	20	−14	0	

Source: FIH
Rules for classification: 1) points; 2) matches won; 3) goal difference; 4) goals for; 5) head-to-head result; 6) field goals scored.
(H) Hosts

== Classification round ==
=== Bracket ===
Crossover
7 February
Argentina	6
Malaysia	2
7 February
Croatia	12
Trinidad and Tobago	3

Ninth place
9 February
Argentina	1
Croatia	7
Eleventh place
9 February
Malaysia	6
Trinidad and Tobago	4

=== Crossover ===
7 February 2025
08:30

Argentina	6–2	Malaysia
González 10+'; Rodríguez 13', 23'; Eleicegui 15', 40'; Moron 16'	Report	Hamsani 25'; Azhar 39'

Umpires:
Emily Carroll (AUS)
Ben Göntgen (GER)

7 February 2025
09:40

Croatia	12–3	Trinidad and Tobago
Mucić 5', 19', 35'; Bachmann 7', 10', 22', 23'; Bachmann 12'; Fujs 13', 29', 37'; Šoić 26'	Report	Marcano 3', 8'; Siu Butt 40'

Umpires:
Ayden Shrives (RSA)
Sean Edwards (ENG)

=== Eleventh and twelfth place ===
9 February 2025
09:00

Malaysia	6–4	Trinidad and Tobago
Hamsani 14', 14'; Hamirin 17', 33'; Jazlan 23'; Mohd 37'	Report	Pierre 7'; Cowie 10'; Marcano 20'; Vieira 21'

Umpires:
Salman (INA)
Łukasz Zwierzchowski (POL)

=== Ninth and tenth place ===
9 February 2025
17:10

Argentina	1–7	Croatia
Navarro Guastelli 1'	Report	Šoić 14'; Bachmann 17', 37'; Krleža 20'; Mucić 24', 24'; Bachmann 31'

Umpires:
Ayden Shrives (RSA)
Łukasz Zwierzchowski (POL)

== Medal round ==
=== Bracket ===
Quarter-finals
7 February
Germany (p.s.o.)	2 (2)
Poland	2 (1)
7 February
South Africa	6
Iran	0
7 February
Belgium	7
Namibia	6
7 February
Austria (p.s.o.)	2 (3)
Australia	2 (2)

Semi-finals
8 February
Germany	6
South Africa	1
8 February
Belgium	2
Austria	4

Final
9 February
Germany (p.s.o.)	6 (2)
Austria	6 (1)
Third place
9 February
South Africa	6
Belgium	5

=== Quarter-finals ===
7 February 2025
13:10

Germany	2–2	Poland
Proske 2'; Schmid 20'	Report	Bembenek 37'; Jarzyński 38'
Penalties
Pöhling (penalty shoot-out missed); Proske (penalty shoot-out scored); Hasbach (penalty shoot-out missed); Proske (penalty shoot-out scored)	2–1	(penalty shoot-out scored) Pawlak; (penalty shoot-out missed) Kurowski; (penalty shoot-out missed) Jarzyński; (penalty shoot-out missed) Pawlak

Umpires:
Sean Edwards (ENG)
Michael Pontus (BEL)

7 February 2025
14:20

South Africa	6–0	Iran
M. Cassiem 6', 11', 40'; Langford 12', 26'; Kraai 28'	Report

Umpires:
Michelle Meister (GER)
Pieter Hembrecht (NED)

7 February 2025
15:30

Belgium	7–6	Namibia
Simar 2', 12'; Thiery 4'; Dykmans 9'; Dykmans 11'; Zimmer 22'; Langer 30'	Report	J. Britz 14', 39'; Jacobs 33'; F. Hansen 34', 35'; D. Britz 40'

Umpires:
Zeke Newman (AUS)
Ayden Shrives (RSA)

7 February 2025
16:40

Austria	2–2	Australia
Unterkircher 9', 28'	Report	Tuddenham 37'; Knee 39'
Penalties
Unterkircher (penalty shoot-out scored); Losonci (penalty shoot-out missed); Eitenberger (penalty shoot-out scored); Unterkircher (penalty shoot-out scored)	3–2	(penalty shoot-out scored) B. Staines; (penalty shoot-out scored) Tuddenham; (penalty shoot-out missed) J. Staines; (penalty shoot-out missed) B. Staines

Umpires:
Ben Göntgen (GER)
Salman (INA)

=== Fifth to eighth place classification ===
Crossover
8 February
Poland	9
Iran	1
8 February
Australia	4
Namibia	3

Fifth place
9 February
Poland	6
Australia	2
Seventh place
9 February
Iran	5
Namibia	4

==== Crossover ====
8 February 2025
11:20

Poland	9–1	Iran
Pawlak 10'; Jarzyński 18', 20', 28', 29', 36'; Bembenek 24', 29'; Gumny 40'	Report	Mamizadeh 14'

Umpires:
Zeke Newman (AUS)
Rachel Williams (ENG)

8 February 2025
12:30

Australia	4–3	Namibia
J. Staines 12', 28'; Miotto 22'; Dooley 27'	Report	J. Britz 16'; Hermanus 37', 38'

Umpires:
Ayden Shrives (RSA)
Łukasz Zwierzchowski (POL)

==== Seventh and eighth place ====
9 February 2025
12:30

Iran	5–4	Namibia
Nooranian 10', 19', 30'; Bohlouli 20'; Shahrokhi 26'	Report	Jacobs 3'; Hermanus 12'; J. Britz 33'; D. Hansen 38'

Umpires:
Ben Göntgen (GER)
Zeke Newman (AUS)

==== Fifth and sixth place ====
9 February 2025
13:40

Poland	6–2	Australia
Pawlak 22'; Jarzyński 26', 38', 39'; Hołosyniuk 33'; Bembenek 34'	Report	Tuddenham 36'; B. Staines 37'

Umpires:
Melina Illanes (ARG)
Ayden Shrives (RSA)

=== First to fourth place classification ===
==== Semi-finals ====
8 February 2025
16:00

Germany	6–1	South Africa
Pöhling 1'; Proske 15'; Hasbach 19', 37', 39'; Von Schwerin 36'	Report	Langford 4'

Umpires:
Sean Edwards (ENG)
Michael Pontus (BEL)

8 February 2025
17:10

Austria	4–2	Belgium
Losonci 8', 27'; Thörnblom 18'; Unterkircher 20'	Report	Simar 22', 38'

Umpires:
Pieter Hembrecht (NED)
Ben Göntgen (GER)

==== Bronze medal match ====
9 February 2025
16:00

South Africa	6–5	Belgium
M. Cassiem 12', 19', 31'; D. Cassiem 20', 35'; Neethling 25'	Report	Simar 3', 11'; Langer 26', 40'; Dykmans 37'

Umpires:
Michelle Meister (GER)
Ben Göntgen (GER)

==== Gold medal match ====
9 February 2025
19:30

Germany	6–6	Austria
Silanoglu 6', 22'; Hasbach 15', 27'; Proske 25'; Pöhling 30'	Report	Unterkircher 8', 17', 27', 36'; Losonci 18', 23'
Penalties
Pöhling (penalty shoot-out missed); Proske (penalty shoot-out scored); Hasbach (penalty shoot-out scored)	2–1	(penalty shoot-out scored) Unterkircher; (penalty shoot-out missed) Losonci; (penalty shoot-out missed) Eitenberger

Umpires:
Pieter Hembrecht (NED)
Sean Edwards (ENG)

== Statistics ==
=== Final standings ===
Pos	Team
1st place, gold medalist(s)	Germany
2nd place, silver medalist(s)	Austria
3rd place, bronze medalist(s)	South Africa
4	Belgium
5	Poland
6	Australia
7	Iran
8	Namibia
9	Croatia (H)
10	Argentina
11	Malaysia
12	Trinidad and Tobago

Source: FIH
(H) Host

=== Awards ===
The following awards were given at the conclusion of the tournament.

Award	Player
Best player	(South Africa) Mustapha Cassiem
Best goalkeeper	(Germany) Joshua Onyekwue Nnaji
Best junior player	(Germany) Ben Hasbach
Top scorer	(Belgium) Philippe Simar

=== Goalscorers ===
There were 310 goals scored in 34 matches, for an average of 9.12 goals per match.

20 goals

- (Belgium) Philippe Simar

17 goals

- (South Africa) Mustapha Cassiem

16 goals

- (Germany) Ben Hasbach

15 goals

- (Poland) Gracjan Jarzyński

13 goals

- (Austria) Fülöp Losonci

12 goals

- (Austria) Fabian Unterkircher

10 goals

- (Germany) Nicolas Proske
- (Namibia) John-Paul Britz

9 goals

- (Croatia) Lucas Bachmann

8 goals

- (Croatia) Mario Mucić

7 goals

- (Australia) Aiden Dooley

6 goals

- (Argentina) Gastón Rodríguez
- (Iran) Hamid Nooranian

5 goals

- (Belgium) Gaetan Dykmans
- (Poland) Eryk Bembenek
- (South Africa) Dalpiarro Langford
- (Trinidad and Tobago) Teague Marcano

4 goals

- (Australia) Jake Staines
- (Belgium) Maximilian Langer
- (Croatia) Gregor Fujs
- (Germany) Philip Schmid
- (Germany) Alec von Schwerin
- (Iran) Sajjad Mamizadeh
- (Malaysia) Khaliq Hamirin
- (Namibia) Liam Hermanus
- (Poland) Jacek Kurowski
- (South Africa) Dayaan Cassiem
- (South Africa) Hans Neethling

3 goals

- (Argentina) Juan Eleicegui
- (Argentina) Facundo Navarro Guastelli
- (Australia) James Knee
- (Australia) Thomas Miotto
- (Australia) Connor Tuddenham
- (Austria) Alexander Bele
- (Belgium) Tanguy Zimmer
- (Croatia) Matthias Bachmann
- (Germany) Max Silanoglu
- (Malaysia) Ashran Hamsani
- (Malaysia) Najmi Jazlan
- (Namibia) David Britz
- (Namibia) Dakota Hansen
- (Namibia) Fagan Hansen
- (Namibia) Pieter Jacobs
- (Poland) Patryk Pawlak
- (Trinidad and Tobago) Mickel Pierre

2 goals

- (Argentina) Joaquín González
- (Australia) Benjamin Staines
- (Belgium) Mallory Magnant
- (Croatia) Josip Krleža
- (Croatia) Ivan Šoić
- (Germany) Paul Dösch
- (Germany) Anton Pöhling
- (Iran) Mohsen Bohlouli
- (Iran) Seyedmohammad Ghoreishiroudbaraki
- (Iran) Mahdi Shahrokhi
- (South Africa) Litha Kraai
- (Trinidad and Tobago) Jordan Vieira

1 goal

- (Argentina) Agustín Ceballos
- (Argentina) Santiago Moron
- (Argentina) Alfredo Sosa
- (Australia) Joshua Gregory
- (Austria) Sebastian Eitenberger
- (Austria) Leon Thörnblom
- (Belgium) Dorian Thiery
- (Croatia) Josip Jazbec
- (Germany) Anton Böckel
- (Iran) Payam Lashgari
- (Malaysia) Muhamad Azhar
- (Malaysia) Faridzul Mohd
- (Malaysia) Firdaus Omar
- (Malaysia) Shahmie Irfan Suhaimi
- (Namibia) Nico Neethling
- (Namibia) Cody van der Merwe
- (Poland) Mikołaj Gumny
- (Poland) Jakub Hołosyniuk
- (Trinidad and Tobago) Darren Cowie
- (Trinidad and Tobago) Shaquille Daniel
- (Trinidad and Tobago) Tarell Singh
- (Trinidad and Tobago) Nicholas Siu Butt

Source: FIH
