= Namibia men's national indoor hockey team =

Namibia
- Association: Namibia Hockey Union
- Confederation: AfHF (Africa)

World Cup
- Appearances: 2 (first in 2011)
- Best result: 8 (2022)

Indoor Africa Cup
- Appearances: 4 (first in 2014)
- Best result: (gold) 1 (2024)
Medal record
Indoor Africa Cup
Silver medal – second place	2014 Windhoek
Silver medal – second place	2017 Swakopmund
Silver medal – second place	2021 Durban
Gold medal – first place	2024 Swakopmund

The Namibia men's national indoor hockey team represents Namibia in men's international indoor hockey competitions and is controlled by the Namibia Hockey Union, the governing body for field hockey in Namibia.

== Tournament record ==
=== Indoor Africa Cup ===
- 2014 – (silver)
- 2017 – (silver)
- 2021 – (silver)
- 2024 – (gold)

=== Indoor Hockey World Cup ===
- 2011 – 12th
- 2023 – 8th
- 2025 – 8th

=== Nkosi Cup ===
- 2023 – (silver)
- 2024 – (silver)
- 2025 – 4th
- 2026 – Qualified

=== Sultan Nazrin Shah Cup ===
- 2023 – (gold)

== Current squad ==
Squad for the 2025 Men's FIH Indoor Hockey World Cup.

Head coach: Trevor Cormack

1. David Strauss (C, GK)
2. Richter van Rooyen (GK)
5. Liam Hermanus
6. David Britz
7. Fagan Hansen
8. John-Paul Britz
9. Cody van der Merwe
10. Nico Neethling
12. Dakota Hansen
13. Pieter Jacobs (C)
14. Matukaramove Kavikairiua
19. Brynn Cleak

== See also ==
- Namibia women's national indoor hockey team
- Namibia men's national field hockey team
