= 2026 Men's Nkosi Cup =

Indoor hockey tournament

Tournament details
- Host country: South Africa
- City: Cape Town
- Dates: 10–15 December
- Teams: 7 (from 5 confederations)
- Venue: Wynberg Military Base Stadium

The 2026 Nkosi Cup is the fourth edition of the Nkosi Cup, an annual invitational international men's indoor hockey tournament in South Africa. It is held at the Wynberg Military Base Stadium, Cape Town, South Africa from 10 to 15 December 2026.

== Teams ==
Australia
Ireland
Malaysia
Namibia
New Zealand
South Africa
United States

== Preliminary round ==
All times are local (All times are local (UTC+2)

Pos	Team	Pld	W	D	L	GF	GA	GD	Pts	Qualification
1	Australia	0	0	0	0	0	0	0	0	Final
2	Ireland	0	0	0	0	0	0	0	0	Final
3	Malaysia	0	0	0	0	0	0	0	0	Bronze
4	Namibia	0	0	0	0	0	0	0	0	Bronze
5	New Zealand	0	0	0	0	0	0	0	0	5–6 place
6	South Africa (H)	0	0	0	0	0	0	0	0	5–6 place
7	United States	0	0	0	0	0	0	0	0	

First match(es) will be played: 10 December 2026. Source: FIH
Rules for classification: 1) points; 2) matches won; 3) goal difference; 4) goals for; 5) head-to-head result; 6) field goals for.
(H) Hosts

10 December 2026
13:00

Namibia	v	New Zealand
	Report

10 December 2026
14:20

Malaysia	v	United States
	Report

10 December 2026
15:40

South Africa	v	Ireland
	Report

11 December 2026
09:00

Australia	v	Ireland
	Report

11 December 2026
10:15

South Africa	v	New Zealand
	Report

11 December 2026
11:30

Namibia	v	United States
	Report

11 December 2026
17:30

Australia	v	New Zealand
	Report

11 December 2026
18:45

Namibia	v	Malaysia
	Report

11 December 2026
20:00

South Africa	v	United States
	Report

12 December 2026
13:15

Australia	v	United States
	Report

12 December 2026
14:30

New Zealand	v	Ireland
	Report

12 December 2026
15:45

South Africa	v	Malaysia
	Report

13 December 2026
14:00

United States	v	New Zealand
	Report

13 December 2026
15:15

Malaysia	v	Ireland
	Report

13 December 2026
16:30

Australia	v	Namibia
	Report

14 December 2026
09:00

Malaysia	v	New Zealand
	Report

14 December 2026
10:15

Namibia	v	Ireland
	Report

14 December 2026
11:30

South Africa	v	Australia
	Report

14 December 2026
17:30

Australia	v	Malaysia
	Report

14 December 2026
18:45

United States	v	Ireland
	Report

14 December 2026
20:00

South Africa	v	Namibia
	Report

== Classification round ==
=== Fifth and sixth place ===
15 December 2026
10:30

5th pool	M22	6th pool
	Report

=== Bronze ===
15 December 2026
13:30

3rd pool	M23	4th pool
	Report

=== Final ===
15 December 2026
19:30

1st pool	M24	2nd pool
	Report

== See also ==
- 2026 Women's Nkosi Cup
