= Luke Wynford =

South African field hockey player

Personal information
- Born: 4 April 2000 (age 26) Port Elizabeth, South Africa

Sport
- Sport: Field hockey
- Position: Midfielder
- Club: Teddington Hockey Club
Senior career
Years	Team	Caps	Goals
2019–2023	University of Cape Town	-	-
2024–2025	Sevenoaks	-	-
2025–present	Teddington Hockey Club	-	-
National team
Years	Team	Caps	Goals
2018	South Africa u18	4	(2)
2021	South Africa u21	6	(0)
2022–present	South Africa	12	(0)
Coaching career
- ?–present: DF Akademie
Medal record
Representing South Africa
Men's field hockey
Africa Cup of Nations
Gold medal – first place	2025 Ismailia
African Youth Games
Gold medal – first place	2018 Algiers

Luke Cole Wynford (born 4 April 2000) is a South African field hockey player who plays for the South Africa national team.

== International career ==
He made South Africa U–18 as the African Youth Games in 2018, and South Africa U–21 as the 2021 Hockey Junior World Cup.

Wynford made his debut for the South African national team in November 2022 in a 2022 Men's FIH Hockey Nations Cup.
