= South Africa men's national indoor hockey team =

South Africa
- Nickname: BlitzStoks
- Association: South African Hockey Association
- Confederation: AfHF (Africa)
- Coach: Justin Rosenberg
- Captain: Dayaan Cassiem

World Cup
- Appearances: 6 (first in 2003)
- Best result: (bronze) (2025)

Indoor Africa Cup
- Appearances: 4 (first in 2014)
- Best result: (gold) 1 (2014 ,2017, 2021)
Medal record
Indoor Africa Cup
Gold medal – first place	2014 Windhoek
Gold medal – first place	2017 Swakopmund
Gold medal – first place	2021 Durban
Silver medal – second place	2024 Swakopmund

The South Africa men's national indoor hockey team represents South Africa at international indoor hockey matches and tournaments.

The team's nickname, "BlitzStoks", is derived from "blitz" an Afrikaans word meaning lightning, and the "sticks" of the South African hockey team.

== Tournament history ==
=== Indoor Africa Cup ===
- 2014 – (gold)
- 2017 – (gold)
- 2021 – (gold)
- 2024 – (silver)

=== Indoor Hockey World Cup ===
- 2003 – 10th place
- 2007 – 11th place
- 2015 – 11th place
- 2018 – 11th place
- 2023 – 6th place
- 2025 – (bronze)

=== Nkosi Cup ===
- 2023 – (gold)
- 2024 – (gold)
- 2025 – (gold)
- 2026 – Qualified

=== Sultan Nazrin Shah Cup ===
- 2023 – (silver)

== Current squad ==
Squad for the 2025 Men's FIH Indoor Hockey World Cup.

Head coach: Justin Rosenberg

1. Anton van Loggerenberg (GK)
2. Mustapha Cassiem
5. Justin Domleo
6. Hans Neethling
7. Dayaan Cassiem (C)
10. Keegan Hezlett
13. Litha Kraai
16. Dalpiarro Langford
17. Rusten Abrahams
21. Jethro Eustice
25. Leruo Ditlhakanyane
30. Cullin de Jager (GK)

== See also ==
- South Africa women's national indoor hockey team
- South Africa men's national field hockey team
