= Australia men's national indoor hockey team =

Australian Indoor Hockey team profile

Australia
- 2025 team at the Nkosi Cup
- Nickname: Budgies
- Association: Hockey Australia
- Confederation: Oceania Hockey Federation
- Coach: Jonathan Stebbbings
- Assistant coach(es): Matthew Hotchkis
- Captain: Jake Staines
- Most caps: Matthew Hotchkis (56)

FIH ranking
- Current: 5 ▲ (February 2025)

World Cup
- Appearances: 7
- Best result: 4th - 2018
Medal record
Silver medal – second place	Nkosi Cup	2025

The Australia men's national indoor hockey team represents Australia in men's international indoor hockey competitions. They are currently ranked 5th in the world. The governing body is Hockey Australia for both indoor and field hockey in Australia. Australia is part of the Oceania Hockey Federation.

Every four years, Australia competes in the FIH Indoor Hockey World Cup where the best finish has been in 4th position in 2018. The Australian national indoor team is nominated and selected from the indoor Australian Championships

The Australian men's coach is Jonathon Stebbings team captain is Jake Staines

Matthew Hotchkis hold the record for most international caps with 56 and is the current assistant coach.

Australia debut at the 2025 Nkosi Cup winning a silver medal

The next world cup is to be held in 2029 with Oceania qualifiers to be held in June 24, 2028

Australia also competed for the first time at the HRH Sultan Nazrin Shah Men's International Indoor Tournament in 2023. The tournament returns in 2026 with Australia to enter a team.

Australia also sends a junior men's (and women's) development team to the Big Apple International Tournament held in Philadelphia USA. They first sent a team in 2004 and will send a team again in 2026. This in not an FIH recognised tournament and caps are not recorded at international level. This is an important platform to develop the international teams with Jett Leong (SA and TAS) and Annelyse Tevant (QLD) graduating to the international team that competed at the Nkosi Cup both winning silver medals.

At the 2026 Nkosi Cup Australia will send an Opens Men's and Women's team and for the first time an under 18's boys and girls team. The under 18's coaches were announced in July 2026 as Ben Poulton for under 18 Men's Team and Amanda Christie for the under 18 Women's Team.

== World Cup rankings ==
In the first Indoor Hockey World Cup, held in Germany in 2003, the Australian team came 8th in the final standings. Their best placing is 4th, achieved in the 2018 World Cup.

== Tournament record ==
=== Indoor Hockey World Cup ===
- 2003 - 8th
- 2007 - 8th
- 2011 - 7th
- 2015 - 10th
- 2018 - 4th
- 2023 – 11th
- 2025 – 6th

=== Nkosi Cup ===
- 2025 – 2nd
- 2026 – Qualified

=== Sultan Nazrin Shah Cup ===
- 2023 – 4th

== Current squad ==
The current 24-man Australian squad was selected at the completion of the 2024/5 national championships held in Canberra. The team to compete at the 2025 Men's FIH Indoor Hockey World Cup was selected from the extended squad.

Squad for the Nkosi Cup 25

Head coach: Jonathan Stebbings

Shirt #	Player Name	Goals	Caps
1	Aiden Dooley	16	15
2	Luke Randle	1	6
3	Brendan Hill (GK)	0	17
5	Ryan Pace	3	12
10	Garry Backhus	0	22
14	Jake Stains	3	21
16	Jett Leong	12	12
18	Ben Rennie (GK)	0	39
19	Mitchell Pace	0	6
23	Scott Govers	3	9
25	Tim Deavon	1	12
55	Connor Tuddenham	2	12

World Cup Players (not attending Nkosi Cup)

Shirt #	Player Name	Goals	Caps
4	Thomas Miotto	3	9
5	James Knee	15	22
17	Joshua Gregory	1	15
31	Ben Staines	9	12

== List of Australian indoor players ==
Category:Australian male indoor hockey players

== See also ==
- Kookaburras (hockey)
- Australia women's national indoor hockey team
- Men's FIH Indoor Hockey World Cup
