= Benjamin Staines =

Australian field hockey player (born 1997)

Personal information
- Full name: Benjamin Joseph Staines
- Born: 13 July 1997 (age 29) Goulburn, New South Wales

Sport
- Sport: Field hockey
- Position: Forward
Senior career
Years	Team	Caps	Goals
2019–	Canberra Chill	-	-
National team
Years	Team	Caps	Goals
2017–2018	Australia U–21	12	(2)
2023–	Australia	4	(1)
2023–	Australia indoor	6	(7)
Medal record
Men's field hockey
Representing Australia
Sultan of Johor Cup
Gold medal – first place	2017 Johor Bahru	Team
Bronze medal – third place	2018 Johor Bahru	Team

Benjamin Joseph Staines (born 13 July 1997) is a field hockey player from Australia, who plays as a forward.

== Personal life ==
Benjamin Staines was born and raised in Goulburn, New South Wales. His twins, Jake, also plays field hockey for Australia indoor.

== Career ==
=== Under–21 ===
In 2017, Staines made his debut for the Australia U–21 team during the Sultan of Johor Cup in Johor Bahru. He followed this up with an appearance at the same tournament the following year.

=== Indoor hockey ===
In 2022, alongside his brother Jake, Staines was named in the Australian Indoor team for the FIH Indoor World Cup in Pretoria.

=== Kookaburras ===
Following a successful domestic league in 2022, Staines was called into the Kookaburras squad for the first time in 2023. He made his international debut during season three of the FIH Pro League in Rourkela.
