= Rusten Abrahams =

South African field hockey player

Personal information
- Full name: Rusten John Abrahams
- Born: 16 December 1997 (age 28)

Sport
- Sport: Field hockey
- Position: Midfielder
- Club: University of the Witwatersrand
National team
| Years | Team | Caps | Goals |
| – | South Africa | 10 | (0) |
| 2019–present | South Africa (indoor) | 23 | (0) |
Medal record
Men's indoor hockey
FIH Indoor World Cup
| Bronze medal – third place | 2025 Poreč |
- Updated on 21 December 2021

Rusten John Abrahams is a South African field hockey player. He competed in the 2020 Summer Olympics.
