= Jethro Eustice =

South African field hockey player

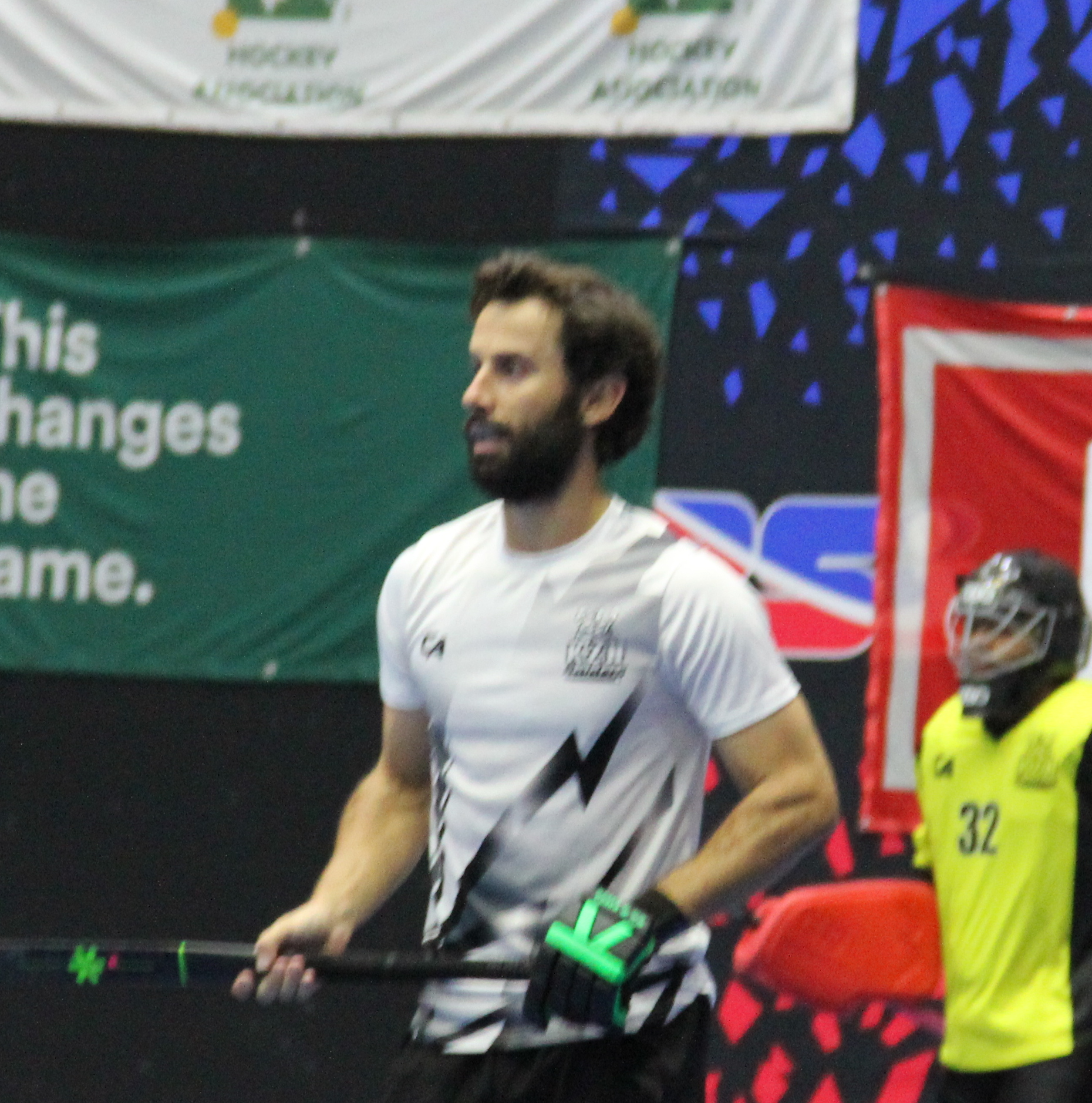
- 2024 - Indoor IPT Men's A-Section: KZN Raiders v Mpumalanga

Personal information
- Full name: Jethro Ray Eustice
- Born: 1 November 1989 (age 36) Benoni, South Africa

Sport
- Sport: Field hockey
- Position: Defender
- Club: Burnside, Adelaide, South Australia
National team
Years	Team	Caps	Goals
–	South Africa	171	(35)
2013–present	South Africa (indoor)	58	(43)
Medal record
Representing South Africa
Men's field hockey
Africa Cup of Nations
Gold medal – first place	2013 Nairobi
Gold medal – first place	2017 Ismailia
Gold medal – first place	2022 Accra
Men's indoor hockey
FIH Indoor World Cup
Bronze medal – third place	2025 Poreč
Indoor Africa Cup
Gold medal – first place	2017 Swakopmund
Gold medal – first place	2021 Durban
Silver medal – second place	2024 Swakopmund
- Updated on 5 June 2022

Jethro Ray Eustice (born 1 November 1989) is a South African field hockey player who plays as a defender for the South African national team. He is also a former cricket player for KZN Inland.

He represented them in the 2014 Rabobank Men's Hockey World Cup in Den Haag, the 2014 Commonwealth Games at Glasgow and the 2018 Men's Hockey World Cup.

During the Spain vs South Africa match, Jethro earned his 150th cap.

He also played provincial under 19 cricket for KZN Inland, where he had captained the side against Free State U19 in Bloemfontein. He is the grandson of former Transvaal cricketer Raymond Eustice
