= Ryan Julius =

South African field hockey player

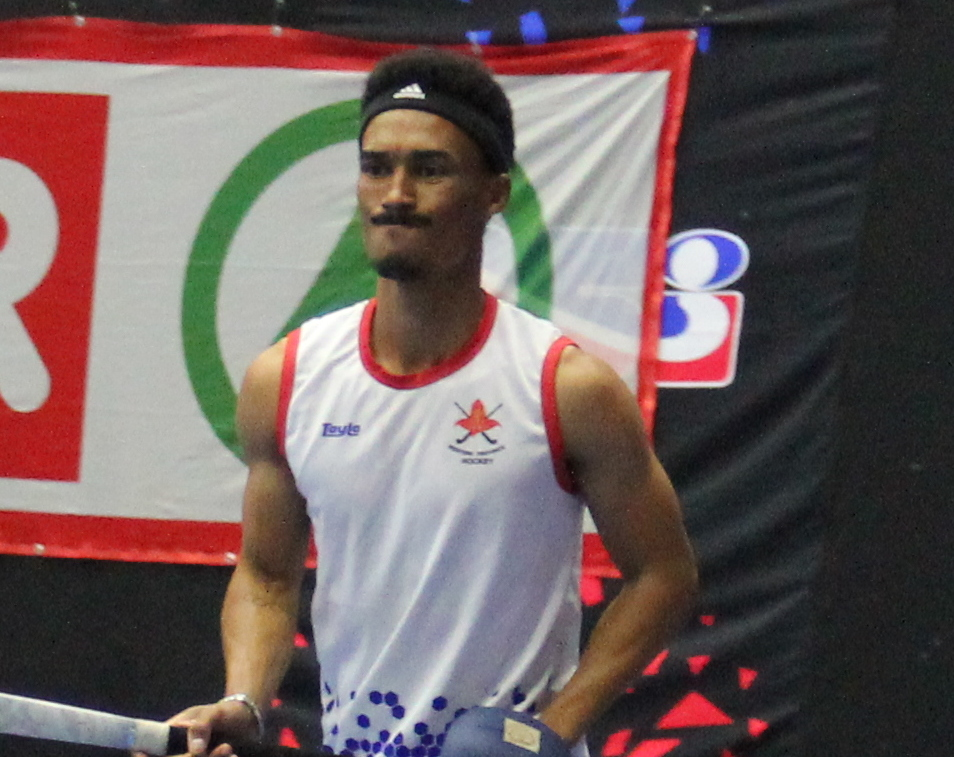
- 2024 - Indoor IPT Men's A-Section: Western Province v Southern Gauteng

Personal information
- Full name: Ryan Cowen Julius
- Born: 19 July 1995 (age 31) Cape Town, South Africa

Sport
- Sport: Field hockey
- Position: Midfielder / Forward
- Club: Almeerse HC
National team
Years	Team	Caps	Goals
2016	South Africa u21	18	(4)
201–present	South Africa (indoor)	32	(34)
2016–2025	South Africa	86	(9)
Medal record
Representing South Africa
Men's field hockey
Africa Cup of Nations
Gold medal – first place	2017 Ismailia
Junior African Cup
Silver medal – second place	2016 Windhoek
Men's indoor hockey
Indoor Africa Cup
Gold medal – first place	2017 Swakopmund
- Updated on 18 March 2025

Ryan Cowen Julius (born 19 July 1995) is a South African field hockey player who plays as a forward for Dutch club Almeerse HC and the South African national team.

He competed in the 2020 Summer Olympics.

== Club career ==
Julius only started playing hockey when he was 13 years old. He moved to the Netherlands in 2020 to play for Almeerse HC in the Hoofdklasse.

He retired from his international outdoor hockey career post the Olympic Games.

== Early life ==
He attended Diocesan College, graduated at the University of the Western Cape.
