= Dayaan Cassiem =

South African field hockey player

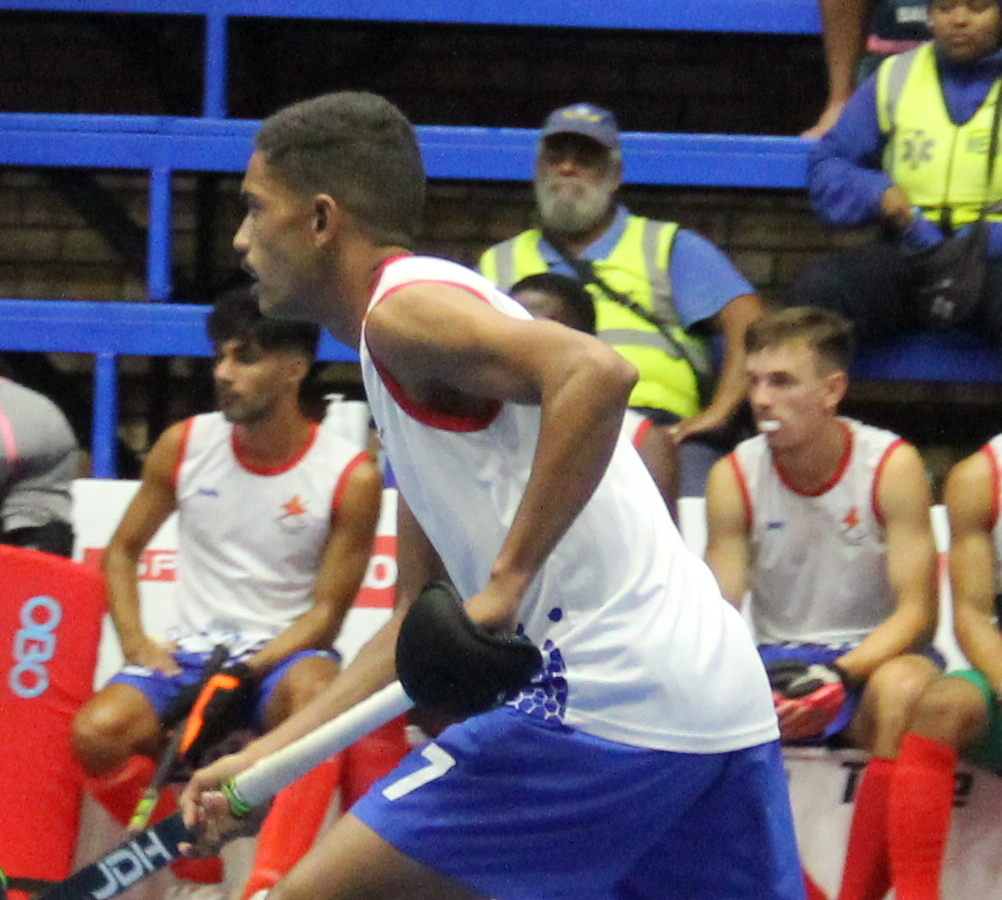
- 2024 - Indoor IPT Men's A-Section: Western Province v Southern Gauteng
- Born: Abdud Dayaan Cassiem; 1 December 1998 (age 27); Cape Town, South Africa
- Education: Bishops Diocesan College
- Father: Abdullah “Casa” Cassiem
- Family: Mustapha Cassiem (brother)
- Field hockey career
- Height: 1.70 m (5 ft 7 in)
- Weight: 62 kg (137 lb)
- Sport: Field hockey
- Position: Forward
- Club: AH&BC
National team
Years	Team	Caps	Goals
2017–present	South Africa	82	(26)
2019–present	South Africa (indoor)	41	(45)
Medal record
Representing South Africa
Men's field hockey
Africa Cup of Nations
Gold medal – first place	2025 Ismailia
Men's indoor hockey
FIH Indoor World Cup
Bronze medal – third place	2025 Poreč
Indoor Africa Cup
Gold medal – first place	2021 Durban
Silver medal – second place	2024 Swakopmund
- Updated on 18 December 2024

Abdud Dayaan Cassiem (born 1 December 1998) is a South African field hockey player who plays as a forward for the South Africa national team. He competed in the 2020 Summer Olympics.

He attended Bishops Diocesan College and graduated a few years ago. His brother Mustapha also is an international hockey player.

== International career ==
He was named the best player at the 2021 Men's Indoor Africa Cup.

== Honours ==
=== Club ===
==== Western Province Hockey ====
- 2018 Indoor IPT Men - Leading Goalscorer
- 2019 Senior IPT (Men's A-Section) - Young Player of the Tournament

==== Central ====
- 2023 Belgotex Elite Club Challenge - Player of the Tournament

=== International ===
- 2021 Men's Indoor Africa Cup - Player of the tournament
- 2022 Men's FIH Hockey Nations Cup - Best player
