= Devohn Noronha-Teixeira =

Canadian field hockey player

Personal information
- Born: February 9, 1989 (age 37) Mississauga, Ontario, Canada
- Height: 1.65 m (5 ft 5 in)
- Weight: 61 kg (134 lb)

Sport
- Sport: Field hockey
- Position: Forward
Senior career
Years	Team	Caps	Goals
–	Toronto Lions	-	-
National team
Years	Team	Caps	Goals
2005–present	Canada (indoor)	48	(23)
2009–present	Canada	103	(9)
Medal record
Representing Canada
Men's field hockey
Pan American Games
Silver medal – second place	2015 Toronto	Team
Bronze medal – third place	2023 Santiago	Team
Pan American Cup
Bronze medal – third place	2022 Santiago
Bronze medal – third place	2025 Montevideo
Men's indoor hockey
Indoor Pan American Cup
Gold medal – first place	2005 Kitchener
Gold medal – first place	2014 Montevideo
Bronze medal – third place	2017 Georgetown
Bronze medal – third place	2021 Spring City

Devohn Noronha-Teixeira (born February 9, 1989) is a male field hockey player, who played for the Canada national field hockey team at the 2015 Pan American Games and won a silver medal.

In 2016, he was named to Canada's Olympic team.
