= 2007 Men's Indoor Hockey World Cup =

International tournament

Tournament details
- Host country: Austria
- City: Vienna
- Dates: 14 - 18 February 2007
- Teams: 12 (from 4 confederations)

Final positions
- Champions: Germany (2nd title)
- Runner-up: Poland
- Third place: Spain

Tournament statistics
- Matches played: 38
- Goals scored: 326 (8.58 per match)
- Top scorer: (Russia) Dmitrii Azarov (18 goals)

The 2007 Men's Indoor Hockey World Cup was the second edition of the Men's Indoor Hockey World Cup and held from 14 to 18 February 2007 in Vienna, Austria.

Germany were the reigning champions and defended their title by beating Poland 4-1 in the final. Spain won their first medal by beating the Czech Republic 3-1 in the bronze-medal match.

== Teams ==
- Australia
- Austria
- Canada
- Czech Republic
- Spain
- Germany
- Italy
- Poland
- South Africa
- Russia
- Switzerland
- Trinidad and Tobago

== Results ==
=== Pool A ===
Pos	Team	Pld	W	D	L	GF	GA	GD	Pts	Qualification
1	Germany	5	5	0	0	33	9	+24	15	Semi-finals
2	Czech Republic	5	4	0	1	26	14	+12	12	Semi-finals
3	Russia	5	2	0	3	31	29	+2	6	
4	Australia	5	2	0	3	19	21	−2	6	
5	Switzerland	5	2	0	3	22	30	−8	6	
6	Trinidad and Tobago	5	0	0	5	7	35	−28	0	

Source: FIH
Rules for classification: 1) points; 2) goal difference; 3) goals scored; 4) head-to-head result.

14 February 2007
09:00

Trinidad and Tobago	2–9	Germany
Browne 3'; Legerton 23'	Report	Deecke 12', 14'; Korn 15'; Hauke 16'; Draguhn 21'; Wess 29'; Furste 34', 35', 39'

14 February 2007
10:05

Switzerland	4–6	Czech Republic
Grandchamp 8', 32'; Gahwiler 14'; Kloter 16'	Report	Bernátek 2', 23', 24'; Procházka 3'; Bodnar 15'; Marik 36'

14 February 2007
10:40

Russia	4–8	Australia
Mamoshkin 2'; Platonov 30'; Sergeyev 35', 39'	Report	Beaton 7', 19'; Stebbings 18', 36'; Black 22', 24', 33'; Harris 26'

14 February 2007
15:55

Germany	3–2	Czech Republic
Deecke 17'; Hauke 36'; Sperling 40'	Report	Marik 30'; Bernátek 32'

14 February 2007
16:30

Switzerland	4–3	Australia
Casagrande 13'; Grandchamp 18', 31'; Cavallet 36'	Report	Black 3'; Stebbings 14'; Beaton 32'

14 February 2007
17:35

Trinidad and Tobago	2–9	Russia
Quan Chan 7'; Browne 21'	Report	Azarov 2', 4', 24'; Mamoshkin 12'; Zhirkov 15', 26'; Sergeyev 16', 16', 27'

15 February 2007
09:00

Czech Republic	7–2	Australia
	Report

15 February 2007
10:05

Germany	8–2	Russia
	Report

15 February 2007
11:45

Switzerland	6–1	Trinidad and Tobago
	Report

15 February 2007
15:25

Czech Republic	5–4	Russia
	Report

15 February 2007
18:05

Germany	8–2	Switzerland
	Report

15 February 2007
18:40

Australia	5–1	Trinidad and Tobago
	Report

16 February 2007
12:10

Russia	12–6	Switzerland
	Report

16 February 2007
12:45

Czech Republic	6–1	Trinidad and Tobago
	Report

16 February 2007
14:45

Australia	1–5	Germany
	Report

=== Pool B ===
Pos	Team	Pld	W	D	L	GF	GA	GD	Pts	Qualification
1	Poland	5	4	1	0	36	8	+28	13	Semi-finals
2	Spain	5	4	0	1	30	18	+12	12	Semi-finals
3	Austria	5	3	1	1	31	18	+13	10	
4	Canada	5	2	0	3	18	29	−11	6	
5	Italy	5	1	0	4	15	30	−15	3	
6	South Africa	5	0	0	5	11	38	−27	0	

Source: FIH
Rules for classification: 1) points; 2) goal difference; 3) goals scored; 4) head-to-head result.

14 February 2007
12:15

Austria	5–3	Italy
	Report

14 February 2007
12:50

Canada	0–9	Poland
	Report

14 February 2007
14:25

Spain	6–1	South Africa
	Report

14 February 2007
18:40

Spain	8–4	Canada
	Report

14 February 2007
19:10

Austria	11–1	South Africa
	Report

15 February 2007
10:40

Poland	8–0	Italy
	Report

15 February 2007
14:25

Canada	4–7	Austria
	Report

15 February 2007
15:55

Spain	2–6	Poland
	Report

15 February 2007
16:30

Italy	7–4	South Africa
	Report

15 February 2007
20:15

Austria	4–6	Spain
	Report

16 February 2007
10:00

Italy	2–5	Canada
	Report

16 February 2007
10:35

South Africa	2–9	Poland
	Report

16 February 2007
15:20

South Africa	3–5	Canada
	Report

16 February 2007
16:25

Italy	3–8	Spain
	Report

16 February 2007
18:00

Poland	4–4	Austria
	Report

=== Fifth to twelfth place classification ===
==== Eleventh and twelfth place ====
17 February 2007
10:40

Trinidad and Tobago	2-4	South Africa
Tousaint 20'; Pierre 34'	Report	Jackson 5', 25'; Botha 11'; Evans 13'

Umpires:
(Austria) Andreas Dobritzhofer
(Australia) David Saunders

==== Ninth and tenth place ====
17 February 2007
11:20

Switzerland	3-3	Italy
Bergmann 10'; Wullschleger 12', 34'	Report	Cirilli 28', 40'; Lanzano 34'
Penalties
Bergmann (penalty shoot-out scored); Gahwiler (penalty shoot-out missed); Casagrande (penalty shoot-out missed); Kloter (penalty shoot-out scored); Wullschleger (penalty shoot-out scored)	3-1	(penalty shoot-out scored) Cirilli; (penalty shoot-out missed) Martinelli; (penalty shoot-out missed) Lanzano; (penalty shoot-out missed) Mapelli

Umpires:
(South Africa) Gary Simmonds
(Netherlands) Roel van Eert

==== Seventh and eighth place ====
17 February 2007
14:00

Australia	4-5	Canada
Stebbings 3'; Bunt 9'; Harris 31'; Beaton 40'	Report	Pereira 14', 33'; Fernandes 22'; Roberts 29'; Joseph 34'

Umpires:
(United States) Gus Soteriades
(Switzerland) Markus Bircher

==== Fifth and sixth place ====
18 February 2007
10:20

Russia	6-2	Austria
Azarov 5', 9', 18'; Sergeyev 26', 33'; Mamoshkin 30'	Report	Körper 17'; Proksch 22'

Umpires:
(Australia) David Saunders
(Spain) Juan Manuel Requena

=== First to fourth place classification ===
Semi-finals
17 February 2007
Poland	4
Czech Republic	2
17 February 2007
Germany	3
Spain	2

Final
18 February 2007
Poland	1
Germany	4
Third place
18 February 2007
Czech Republic	1
Spain	3

==== Semi-finals ====
17 February 2007
16:40

Poland	4-2	Czech Republic
Rachwalski 15'; Dutkiewicz 23', 32'; Mikula 35'	Report	Bernátek 2', 38'

Umpires:
(Germany) Christian Blasch
(Netherlands) Philip Schellekens

17 February 2007
19:20

Germany	3-2	Spain
Deecke 9', 19', 40'	Report	Freixa 16'; Delas 23'

Umpires:
(Portugal) Pedro Teixeira
(Scotland) David Leiper

==== Third and fourth place ====
18 February 2007
13:00

Czech Republic	1-3	Spain
Bernátek 20'	Report	Freixa 19', 30'; Delas 27'

Umpires:
(Scotland) David Leiper
(Germany) Markus Petter

==== Final ====
18 February 2007
15:40

Poland	1-4	Germany
Malecki 17'	Report	Sperling 22'; Furste 28'; Draguhn 36'; Deecke 40'

Umpires:
(Austria) Andreas Dobritzhofer
(Netherlands) Roel van Eert

== Final ranking ==
Rank	Team
Gold medal	Germany
Silver medal	Poland
Bronze medal	Spain
4	Czech Republic
5	Russia
6	Austria
7	Canada
8	Australia
9	Switzerland
10	Italy
11	South Africa
12	Trinidad and Tobago

== Goalscorers ==
There were 328 goals scored in 38 matches, for an average of 8.63 goals per match.

18 goals

- (Russia) Dmitrii Azarov

15 goals

- (Czech Republic) Štepan Bernátek

12 goals

- (Austria) Michael Körper

9 goals

- (Germany) Oskar Deecke
- (Germany) Moritz Furste

8 goals

- (Germany) Sebastian Draguhn
- (Poland) Tomasz Choczaj
- (Poland) Pietr Mikula
- (Russia) Alexey Sergeyev
- (Spain) Oriol Freixa

7 goals

- (Austria) Peter Proksch
- (Canada) Jonathan Roberts
- (Poland) Tomasz Dutkiewicz

6 goals

- (Australia) Jonathon Stebbings
- (Canada) Wayne Fernandes
- (Russia) Alexei Mamoshkin
- (Spain) Miguel Delas
- (Switzerland) Ulrich Bergmann
- (Italy) Gianluca Cirilli

5 goals

- (Australia) Simon Beaton
- (Australia) Jason Black
- (Australia) Mark Harris
- (Austria) Benjamin Stanzl
- (Germany) Tobias Hauke
- (Poland) Marcin Grotowski
- (Poland) Dariusz Rachwalski
- (Spain) Eduardo Aguilar
- (Switzerland) Tobias Bergmann
- (Italy) Massimo Lanzano

4 goals

- (Canada) Ken Pereira
- (Czech Republic) Tomas Procházka
- (Germany) Benedikt Sperling
- (Poland) Tomasz Górny
- (Russia) Alexander Zhirkov
- (South Africa) Michael Botha
- (South Africa) Iain Evans
- (Spain) Eduard Arbós
- (Spain) Diego Gavilán
- (Switzerland) Thierry Grandchamp

3 goals

- (Austria) Christian Minar
- (Germany) Oliver Korn
- (South Africa) Dale Isaac
- (Spain) Jordi Carrera
- (Switzerland) Michael Kloter
- (Trinidad and Tobago) Kwan Browne
- (Italy) Federico Ardito

2 goals

- (Austria) Elmar Stremitzer
- (Canada) Robin D'abreo
- (Canada) Paul Wettlaufer
- (Czech Republic) Petr Bodnar
- (Czech Republic) Filip Jaros
- (Czech Republic) Richard Kotrc
- (Czech Republic) Roman Marik
- (Poland) Tomasz Marcinkowski
- (South Africa) Pierre-Gerard Geldenhuys
- (South Africa) Sean Jackson
- (Spain) Pedro Martín
- (Spain) Cesar Sahuquillo
- (Switzerland) Michael Casagrande
- (Switzerland) Thomas Gahwiler
- (Switzerland) Fabian Wullschleger
- (Trinidad and Tobago) Wayne Legerton
- (Trinidad and Tobago) Mickell Pierre
- (Italy) Jacopo Lunetta

1 goal

- (Australia) Jye Bunt
- (Australia) Matthew Hotchkis
- (Austria) Robert Buchta
- (Austria) Patrick Fischer
- (Austria) Fabian Ringler
- (Austria) Armin Stremitzer
- (Canada) Cregan Joseph
- (Canada) Scott Sandison
- (Czech Republic) Ales Perinka
- (Czech Republic) Ondrej Vudmaska
- (Germany) Sebastian Biederlack
- (Germany) Timo Wess
- (Poland) Robert Grzeszczak
- (Poland) Dariusz Malecki
- (Russia) Alexander Platonov
- (Spain) Sergi Enrique
- (Switzerland) Christian Cavallet
- (Trinidad and Tobago) Dwain Quan Chan
- (Trinidad and Tobago) Akim Toussaint
- (Italy) Devis Mapelli
- (Italy) Luca Urli

Source: FIH

== See also ==
- 2007 Women's Indoor Hockey World Cup
