= Patrick Harris (field hockey) =

American field hockey player

Personal information
- Full name: Patrick Glen Harris
- Born: 13 March 1985 (age 41) Thousand Oaks, CA, United States
- Height: 174 cm (5 ft 9 in)
- Weight: 80 kg (176 lb)

Sport
- Sport: Field hockey
- Position: Midfield
National team
Years	Team	Caps	Goals
2000–2005	United States U–21	12	(15)
2000–	United States	187	(95)
Medal record
Men's field hockey
Representing United States
Pan American Games
Bronze medal – third place	2019 Lima	Team
Pan American Cup
Silver medal – second place	2009 Santiago
Silver medal – second place	2025 Montevideo
Bronze medal – third place	2017 Lancaster
Men's indoor hockey
Indoor Pan American Cup
Gold medal – first place	2008 San Juan
Silver medal – second place	2002 Rockville
Silver medal – second place	2010 Barquisimeto
Silver medal – second place	2021 Spring City
Bronze medal – third place	2005 Kitchener

Patrick 'Pat' Glen Harris (born 13 March 1985) is an indoor and field hockey player from the United States.

== Personal life ==
Harris is a native of California. He was born in Thousand Oaks, and raised in the nearby city of Moorpark. His brother, Sean, also played field hockey for the United States at international level.

He is an alumnus of Moorpark High School and the University of Pennsylvania.

== Field hockey ==
=== Under–21 ===
Harris was a member of the United States U–21 side from 1999 through to 2006.

During his time with the national junior squad, he competed at two editions of the Pan American Junior Championship. At the 2000 edition in Santiago, the team finished in fourth place. At the 2005 edition in Havana, the team finished in fourth again, with Harris named as the Player of the Tournament.

=== Senior national team ===
Harris received his first call-up to the United States national squad in 2000, at just 15 years of age. He made his senior international debut later that year, earning his first senior cap during a match against Mexico at the inaugural edition of the Pan American Cup in Havana.

Throughout his career, Harris has represented the national team at a multitude of major international tournaments. During this time, he has medalled with the team on three separate occasions. In 2009 he won his first, taking home an historic silver medal at the Pan American Cup in Santiago. His other two medals were both bronze. He won his first bronze at the 2017 Pan American Cup in Lancaster and the second at the XVIII Pan American Games in Lima.

As of 2025, Harris is still an active member of the senior national team. He was most recently named in the squad for the 2025 Pan American Cup in Montevideo, which will be his seventh edition of the tournament. He is the only player in Pan America to have competed at every single edition of the Pan American Cup.

Major International Tournaments
The following is a list of major international tournaments Harris has competed in throughout his career.

- 2000 Pan American Cup – Havana
- 2001 Intercontinental Cup – Edinburgh
- 2003 Pan American Games – Santo Domingo
- 2004 Pan American Cup – London
- 2007 Pan American Games – Rio de Janeiro
- 2008 FIH Olympic Qualifiers – Auckland
- 2009 Pan American Cup – Santiago
- 2009 FIH World Cup Qualifiers – Quilmes
- 2011 FIH Champions Challenge II – Lille
- 2012–13 FIH World League – Chula Vista, Rio de Janeiro
- 2013 Pan American Cup – Brampton
- 2014–15 FIH World League – San Diego
- 2015 Pan American Games – Toronto
- 2016–17 FIH World League – Tacarigua
- 2017 Pan American Cup – Lancaster
- 2018–19 FIH Series – Bhubaneswar
- 2019 Pan American Games – Lima
- 2022 Pan American Cup – Santiago
- 2023 Pan American Games – Santiago
- 2024–25 FIH Nations Cup II – Muscat
- 2025 Pan American Cup – Montevideo

== Indoor hockey ==
In addition to field hockey, Harris also represented the United States in indoor hockey. Throughout his indoor career, he has medalled at five editions of the Indoor Pan American Cup. He won gold at the 2008 edition in San Juan, silver at the 2002, 2010 and 2021 editions, held in Rockville, Barquisimeto and Spring City, respectively, and finally bronze at the 2005 edition, held in Kitchener.

He has also represented the United States at every edition of the FIH Indoor World Cup the national team has qualified for. These include the 2003, 2011 and 2023 editions of the competition, held in Leipzig, Poznań and Pretoria, respectively.

== International goals ==
The following is a list of field hockey goals scored by Harris at international level.

Goal	Date	Location	Opponent	Score	Result	Competition	Ref.
1	23 June 2000	Estadio de Hockey Antonio Maceo, Havana, Cuba	Mexico	3–0	6–0	2000 Pan American Cup	
2	19 July 2001	Scottish Hockey Centre of Excellence, Edinburgh, Scotland	Canada	2–4	2–4	2001 Intercontinental Cup	
3	9 August 2002	Cancha de Hockey Sobre Césped Siglo XXI, Salamanca, Mexico	Venezuela	4–0	7–0	Test Match	
4	5 May 2003	Santo Domingo Stadium, Santo Domingo, Dominican Republic	Mexico	3–2	4–3	2003 Pan American Cup Qualifiers	
5	11 May 2003	Santo Domingo Stadium, Santo Domingo, Dominican Republic	Dominican Republic	12–0	16–1	2003 Pan American Cup Qualifiers	
6	11 May 2003	Santo Domingo Stadium, Santo Domingo, Dominican Republic	Dominican Republic	14–1	16–1	2003 Pan American Cup Qualifiers	
7	11 May 2003	Santo Domingo Stadium, Santo Domingo, Dominican Republic	Dominican Republic	16–1	16–1	2003 Pan American Cup Qualifiers	
8	6 August 2003	Santo Domingo Stadium, Santo Domingo, Dominican Republic	Dominican Republic	3–0	23–0	XIV Pan American Games	
9	6 August 2003	Santo Domingo Stadium, Santo Domingo, Dominican Republic	Dominican Republic	7–0	23–0	XIV Pan American Games	
10	6 August 2003	Santo Domingo Stadium, Santo Domingo, Dominican Republic	Dominican Republic	12–0	23–0	XIV Pan American Games	
11	6 August 2003	Santo Domingo Stadium, Santo Domingo, Dominican Republic	Dominican Republic	17–0	23–0	XIV Pan American Games	
12	6 August 2003	Santo Domingo Stadium, Santo Domingo, Dominican Republic	Dominican Republic	19–0	23–0	XIV Pan American Games	
13	6 August 2003	Santo Domingo Stadium, Santo Domingo, Dominican Republic	Dominican Republic	21–0	23–0	XIV Pan American Games	
14	6 August 2003	Santo Domingo Stadium, Santo Domingo, Dominican Republic	Dominican Republic	22–0	23–0	XIV Pan American Games	
15	6 August 2003	Santo Domingo Stadium, Santo Domingo, Dominican Republic	Dominican Republic	23–0	23–0	XIV Pan American Games	
16	12 August 2003	Santo Domingo Stadium, Santo Domingo, Dominican Republic	Trinidad and Tobago	2–1	3–2	XIV Pan American Games	
17	12 May 2004	TD Waterhouse Stadium, London, Canada	Brazil	2–0	10–1	2004 Pan American Cup	
18	12 May 2004	TD Waterhouse Stadium, London, Canada	Brazil	8–1	10–1	2004 Pan American Cup	
19	13 May 2004	TD Waterhouse Stadium, London, Canada	Puerto Rico	10–1	11–1	2004 Pan American Cup	
20	15 May 2004	TD Waterhouse Stadium, London, Canada	Venezuela	3–0	8–0	2004 Pan American Cup	
21	15 May 2004	TD Waterhouse Stadium, London, Canada	Venezuela	4–0	8–0	2004 Pan American Cup	
22	15 May 2004	TD Waterhouse Stadium, London, Canada	Venezuela	7–0	8–0	2004 Pan American Cup	
23	16 May 2004	TD Waterhouse Stadium, London, Canada	Argentina	1–6	1–6	2004 Pan American Cup	
24	18 May 2004	TD Waterhouse Stadium, London, Canada	Chile	1–2	1–2	2004 Pan American Cup	
25	22 May 2004	TD Waterhouse Stadium, London, Canada	Puerto Rico	1–0	11–0	2004 Pan American Cup	
26	22 May 2004	TD Waterhouse Stadium, London, Canada	Puerto Rico	7–0	11–0	2004 Pan American Cup	
27	19 February 2006	United States Olympic Training Center, Chula Vista, United States	Canada	1–5	1–7	Test Match	
28	16 July 2006	USA Regional Field Hockey Training Center, Virginia Beach, United States	Trinidad and Tobago	3–2	3–2	Test Match	
29	30 May 2007	Lanzhou Olympic Center Stadium, Lanzhou, China	Japan	1–0	2–6	Test Match	
30	31 May 2007	Lanzhou Olympic Center Stadium, Lanzhou, China	China	1–5	1–8	Test Match	
31	16 July 2007	Círculo Militar Deodoro, Rio de Janeiro, Brazil	Chile	1–0	1–2	XV Pan American Games	
32	18 July 2007	Círculo Militar Deodoro, Rio de Janeiro, Brazil	Canada	2–2	2–2	XV Pan American Games	
33	22 July 2007	Círculo Militar Deodoro, Rio de Janeiro, Brazil	Cuba	1–3	1–4	XV Pan American Games	
34	25 July 2007	Círculo Militar Deodoro, Rio de Janeiro, Brazil	Brazil	5–0	13–0	XV Pan American Games	
35	25 July 2007	Círculo Militar Deodoro, Rio de Janeiro, Brazil	Brazil	7–0	13–0	XV Pan American Games	
36	25 July 2007	Círculo Militar Deodoro, Rio de Janeiro, Brazil	Brazil	8–0	13–0	XV Pan American Games	
37	25 July 2007	Círculo Militar Deodoro, Rio de Janeiro, Brazil	Brazil	9–0	13–0	XV Pan American Games	
38	25 July 2007	Círculo Militar Deodoro, Rio de Janeiro, Brazil	Brazil	12–0	13–0	XV Pan American Games	
39	16 December 2007	United States Olympic Training Center, Chula Vista, United States	Trinidad and Tobago	1–0	3–1	Test Match	
40	16 December 2007	United States Olympic Training Center, Chula Vista, United States	Trinidad and Tobago	2–0	3–1	Test Match	
41	17 December 2007	United States Olympic Training Center, Chula Vista, United States	Trinidad and Tobago	2–2	2–2	Test Match	
42	19 December 2007	United States Olympic Training Center, Chula Vista, United States	Trinidad and Tobago	1–2	4–4	Test Match	
43	19 December 2007	United States Olympic Training Center, Chula Vista, United States	Trinidad and Tobago	2–3	4–4	Test Match	
44	19 December 2007	United States Olympic Training Center, Chula Vista, United States	Trinidad and Tobago	4–4	4–4	Test Match	
45	20 December 2007	United States Olympic Training Center, Chula Vista, United States	Trinidad and Tobago	2–2	4–4	Test Match	
46	20 December 2007	United States Olympic Training Center, Chula Vista, United States	Trinidad and Tobago	3–3	4–4	Test Match	
47	20 December 2007	United States Olympic Training Center, Chula Vista, United States	Trinidad and Tobago	4–4	4–4	Test Match	
48	22 December 2007	United States Olympic Training Center, Chula Vista, United States	Trinidad and Tobago	2–1	4–4	Test Match	
49	3 February 2008	North Harbour Hockey Stadium, Auckland, New Zealand	France	2–0	4–7	2008 FIH Olympic Qualifiers	
50	9 February 2008	North Harbour Hockey Stadium, Auckland, New Zealand	Trinidad and Tobago	1–2	4–2	2008 FIH Olympic Qualifiers	
51	10 February 2008	North Harbour Hockey Stadium, Auckland, New Zealand	Trinidad and Tobago	1–1	2–3	2008 FIH Olympic Qualifiers	
52	15 February 2009	United States Olympic Training Center, Chula Vista, United States	Canada	1–1	1–2	Test Match	
53	22 February 2009	United States Olympic Training Center, Chula Vista, United States	Argentina	1–5	1–5	Test Match	
54	8 March 2009	Prince of Wales Country Club, Santiago, Chile	Uruguay	1–0	9–0	2009 Pan American Cup	
55	8 March 2009	Prince of Wales Country Club, Santiago, Chile	Uruguay	2–0	9–0	2009 Pan American Cup	
56	8 March 2009	Prince of Wales Country Club, Santiago, Chile	Uruguay	4–0	9–0	2009 Pan American Cup	
57	8 March 2009	Prince of Wales Country Club, Santiago, Chile	Uruguay	5–0	9–0	2009 Pan American Cup	
58	14 March 2009	Prince of Wales Country Club, Santiago, Chile	Chile	1–0	2–1	2009 Pan American Cup	
59	15 March 2009	Prince of Wales Country Club, Santiago, Chile	Canada	1–0	1–2	2009 Pan American Cup	
60	15 November 2009	Estadio Nacional de Hockey, Quilmes, Argentina	Argentina	1–4	1–6	2009 FIH World Cup Qualifiers	
61	21 November 2009	Estadio Nacional de Hockey, Quilmes, Argentina	Belgium	1–1	3–3	2009 FIH World Cup Qualifiers	
62	22 November 2009	Estadio Nacional de Hockey, Quilmes, Argentina	Chile	1–0	2–1	2009 FIH World Cup Qualifiers	
63	2 July 2011	Lille Métropole Hockey Club, Lille, France	Czech Republic	2–1	2–3	2011 FIH Champions Challenge II	
64	5 July 2011	Lille Métropole Hockey Club, Lille, France	Austria	1–0	1–0	2011 FIH Champions Challenge II	
65	7 July 2011	Lille Métropole Hockey Club, Lille, France	Ireland	2–5	2–6	2011 FIH Champions Challenge II	
66	10 July 2011	Lille Métropole Hockey Club, Lille, France	Austria	5–2	5–2	2011 FIH Champions Challenge II	
67	17 November 2012	United States Olympic Training Center, Chula Vista, United States	Guatemala	1–0	16–0	2012–13 FIH World League Round 1	
68	17 November 2012	United States Olympic Training Center, Chula Vista, United States	Guatemala	4–0	16–0	2012–13 FIH World League Round 1	
69	17 November 2012	United States Olympic Training Center, Chula Vista, United States	Guatemala	8–0	16–0	2012–13 FIH World League Round 1	
70	17 November 2012	United States Olympic Training Center, Chula Vista, United States	Guatemala	9–0	16–0	2012–13 FIH World League Round 1	
71	18 November 2012	United States Olympic Training Center, Chula Vista, United States	Mexico	2–0	8–0	2012–13 FIH World League Round 1	
72	18 November 2012	United States Olympic Training Center, Chula Vista, United States	Mexico	5–0	8–0	2012–13 FIH World League Round 1	
73	18 November 2012	United States Olympic Training Center, Chula Vista, United States	Mexico	8–0	8–0	2012–13 FIH World League Round 1	
74	3 March 2013	Círculo Militar Deodoro, Rio de Janeiro, Brazil	Trinidad and Tobago	1–0	1–1 (3–4)	2012–13 FIH World League Round 2	
75	12 August 2013	Cassie Campbell Hockey Field, Brampton, Canada	Uruguay	7–0	12–0	2013 Pan American Cup	
76	12 August 2013	Cassie Campbell Hockey Field, Brampton, Canada	Uruguay	10–0	12–0	2013 Pan American Cup	
77	12 August 2013	Cassie Campbell Hockey Field, Brampton, Canada	Uruguay	11–0	12–0	2013 Pan American Cup	
78	12 August 2013	Cassie Campbell Hockey Field, Brampton, Canada	Uruguay	12–0	12–0	2013 Pan American Cup	
79	14 August 2013	Cassie Campbell Hockey Field, Brampton, Canada	Mexico	1–1	3–2	2013 Pan American Cup	
80	14 August 2013	Cassie Campbell Hockey Field, Brampton, Canada	Mexico	2–2	3–2	2013 Pan American Cup	
81	14 August 2013	Cassie Campbell Hockey Field, Brampton, Canada	Mexico	3–2	3–2	2013 Pan American Cup	
82	28 February 2015	United States Olympic Training Center, Chula Vista, United States	Canada	2–4	2–5	2014–15 FIH World League Round 2	
83	1 March 2015	United States Olympic Training Center, Chula Vista, United States	Trinidad and Tobago	2–1	7–1	2014–15 FIH World League Round 2	
84	1 March 2015	United States Olympic Training Center, Chula Vista, United States	Trinidad and Tobago	5–1	7–1	2014–15 FIH World League Round 2	
85	1 March 2015	United States Olympic Training Center, Chula Vista, United States	Trinidad and Tobago	6–1	7–1	2014–15 FIH World League Round 2	
83	8 March 2015	United States Olympic Training Center, Chula Vista, United States	Trinidad and Tobago	3–1	5–3	2014–15 FIH World League Round 2	
84	8 March 2015	United States Olympic Training Center, Chula Vista, United States	Trinidad and Tobago	4–2	5–3	2014–15 FIH World League Round 2	
85	8 March 2015	United States Olympic Training Center, Chula Vista, United States	Trinidad and Tobago	5–3	5–3	2014–15 FIH World League Round 2	
86	25 July 2015	Pan Am / Parapan Am Fields, Toronto, Canada	Mexico	5–2	6–2	XVII Pan American Games	
87	26 March 2017	National Hockey Centre, Tacarigua, Trinidad and Tobago	Barbados	1–0	7–1	2016–17 FIH World League Round 2	
88	26 March 2017	National Hockey Centre, Tacarigua, Trinidad and Tobago	Barbados	6–0	7–1	2016–17 FIH World League Round 2	
89	30 March 2017	National Hockey Centre, Tacarigua, Trinidad and Tobago	Trinidad and Tobago	2–2	2–2 (3–2)	2016–17 FIH World League Round 2	
90	2 April 2017	National Hockey Centre, Tacarigua, Trinidad and Tobago	Russia	1–1	2–2 (2–1)	2016–17 FIH World League Round 2	
91	9 July 2018	Glasgow National Hockey Centre, Glasgow, Scotland	Scotland	3–1	3–1	Test Match	
92	30 July 2019	Andrés Avelino Cáceres Sports Complex, Lima, Peru	Peru	2–0	7–1	XVIII Pan American Games	
93	3 August 2019	Andrés Avelino Cáceres Sports Complex, Lima, Peru	Mexico	3–1	5–1	XVIII Pan American Games	
94	5 August 2019	Andrés Avelino Cáceres Sports Complex, Lima, Peru	Cuba	1–0	5–1	XVIII Pan American Games	
95	25 October 2023	Centro de Hockey Césped Claudia Schüler, Santiago, Chile	Trinidad and Tobago	2–0	6–1	XIX Pan American Games	
