= Alison Lee (field hockey) =

Canadian field and indoor hockey player

Personal information
- Born: December 24, 1994 (age 31) Mississauga, Ontario, Canada
- Height: 164 cm (5 ft 5 in)
- Weight: 61 kg (134 lb)

Sport
- Sport: Field hockey
- Position: Defense
- Club: Toronto Toros
National team
Years	Team	Caps	Goals
2013–	Canada Indoor	30	(18)
2017–	Canada	61	(2)
Medal record
Women's indoor hockey
Representing Canada
Pan American Cup
Bronze medal – third place	2022 Santiago
Indoor Pan American Cup
Gold medal – first place	2014 Montevideo
Silver medal – second place	2021 Spring City

Alison Lee (born 24 December 1994) is an indoor and field hockey player from Canada.

== Personal life ==
Alison Lee was born and raised in Mississauga, Ontario.

== Career ==
=== Indoor ===
In 2013, Alison Lee made her debut for the Canada Indoor team, during a test series against the United States in Feasterville.

Throughout her indoor career Lee has medalled with the team once, winning gold at the 2014 Indoor Pan American Cup in Montevideo. Since then, she has gone on to become captain of the team.

=== Field hockey ===
As well as indoor hockey, Lee also plays field hockey for the Canadian national team. She debuted in 2017, and has gone on to represent the team in several tournaments since.

Her most notable inclusion in the national team was at the 2018 Commonwealth Games held on the Gold Coast.
