= Aki Käppeler =

American field hockey player

Personal information
- Full name: Hans Aki Käppeler
- Born: 10 July 1994 (age 32) Stuttgart, Germany

Sport
- Sport: Field hockey
- Position: Defence
Senior career
Years	Team	Caps	Goals
HTC Stuttgarter Kickers	2004–2013	-	-
Mannheimer HC	2013–2016	-	-
TSV Mannheim	2016–2020	-	-
HC Klein Zwitserland	2020–	-	-
National team
Years	Team	Caps	Goals
2012–	United States	97	(50)
2021–	United States Indoor	17	(23)
Medal record
Men's field hockey
Representing United States
Pan American Games
Bronze medal – third place	2019 Lima	Team
Pan American Cup
Silver medal – second place	2025 Montevideo
Bronze medal – third place	2017 Lancaster
Men's indoor hockey
Indoor Pan American Cup
Silver medal – second place	2021 Spring City

Hans Aki Käppeler (born 10 July 1994) is a German–American international indoor and field hockey player.

== Personal life ==
Käppeler was born and raised in Stuttgart, Germany.

His biological grandparents are Tadaaki Kuwayama and Rakuko Naito, both Japanese artists who resided in New York City. Being residents of the United States, his grandparents gave rise to his American heritage, allowing him to obtain dual citizenship.

He followed in his parents' footsteps, pursuing a career in architecture, the profession of both his mother and father.

His brother Kei also plays international field hockey for the United States.

== Field hockey ==
=== Domestic leagues ===
Käppeler currently competes in the Tulp Hoofdklasse, the top level domestic competition of the Netherlands. He has been a member of the Klein Zwitserland Men's First team since 2020.

=== Under–21 ===
From 2012 to 2013, Käppeler was a member of the United States U–21 side. He made his first appearances for the team at the 2012 Pan American Junior Championship in Guadalajara, where the team finished fourth. He followed this up with an appearance at the 2013 Australian Youth Olympic Festival in Sydney.

=== Senior national team ===
Prior to making his junior international debut in 2012, Käppeler received his first call-up to the United States national squad earlier that year. He earned his first senior international cap during a match against Guatemala in Chula Vista, during Round 1 of the 2012–13 FIH World League.

Throughout his senior career, Käppeler has only medalled with the national squad on two occasions, winning bronze both times. His first medal came at the 2017 Pan American Cup in Lancaster, and the second at the XVIII Pan American Games in Lima.

As of 2025, Käppeler is still an active member of the senior national team. He was most recently named in the squad for the 2025 Pan American Cup in Montevideo.

Major International Tournaments
The following is a list of major international tournaments Käppeler has competed in throughout his career.

- 2012–13 FIH World League – Chula Vista, Rio de Janeiro
- 2013 Pan American Cup – Brampton
- 2014–15 FIH World League – San Diego
- 2015 Pan American Games – Toronto
- 2016–17 FIH World League – Tacarigua
- 2017 Pan American Cup – Lancaster
- 2018–19 FIH Series – Bhubaneswar
- 2019 Pan American Games – Lima
- 2022 Pan American Cup – Santiago
- 2023 Pan American Games – Santiago
- 2024–25 FIH Nations Cup II – Muscat
- 2025 Pan American Cup – Montevideo

== Indoor hockey ==
In addition to field hockey, Käppeler also represented the United States in indoor hockey. He made his first appearances for the United States Indoor team in 2021 at the Indoor Pan American Cup in Spring City, where he won a silver medal. Since his debut, he has also represented the side at the 2023 FIH Indoor World Cup in Pretoria and the 2023 Nkosi Cup in Cape Town.
