= 2010 Men's Indoor Pan American Cup =

International indoor hockey competition

Tournament details
- City: Barquisimeto, Venezuela
- Dates: 9–15 August
- Teams: 9 (from 1 confederation)

Final positions
- Champions: Canada (3rd title)
- Runner-up: United States
- Third place: Argentina

Tournament statistics
- Matches played: 23
- Goals scored: 149 (6.48 per match)
- Top scorer(s): (Canada) Jonathan Roberts (18 goals)
- Best player: (Canada) Jonathan Roberts

The 2010 Men's Indoor Pan American Cup was the 5th edition of the Indoor Pan American Cup, an indoor hockey competition. The tournament was held in Barquisimeto, Venezuela, from 9–15 August.

Canada won the tournament for the third time, defeating the United States 6–3 in the final. Argentina won the bronze medal after defeating Trinidad and Tobago 4–2.

== Teams ==
The following nine teams competed for the title:

- Argentina
- Canada
- Guyana
- Mexico
- Peru
- United States
- Uruguay
- Trinidad and Tobago
- Venezuela

== Results ==
All times are local (UTC−04:00).

=== Preliminary round ===
==== Pool A ====
Pos	Team	Pld	W	D	L	GF	GA	GD	Pts	Qualification
1	Canada	4	4	0	0	33	7	+26	12	Advanced to Semi-Finals
2	Argentina	4	3	0	1	13	6	+7	9	Advanced to Semi-Finals
3	Guyana	4	2	0	2	15	21	−6	6	
4	Peru	4	1	0	3	10	15	−5	3	
5	Venezuela (H)	4	0	0	4	9	31	−22	0	

Source: Pan American Hockey Federation
Rules for classification: 1) points; 2) goal difference; 3) games won; 4) head-to-head result.
(H) Hosts

9 August 2010
11:10

Argentina	2–0	Guyana
G. Luna 4'; Fava 18'	Report

Umpires:
Gary Simmonds (RSA)
Donny Gobinsingh (TTO)

9 August 2010
14:25

Venezuela	1–5	Peru
A. Hernández 12'	Report	Knight 2', 8', 38'; Márquez 3'; Vingerhoets 31'

Umpires:
Gregory Uyttenhove (BEL)
Diego Barbas (ARG)

10 August 2010
14:30

Canada	11–3	Guyana
Roberts 7', 18', 21', 25', 38', 40'; Jeewanjet 8'; Abu-Ali 12'; Govia 13'; Barber 28'; Hignell 31'	Report	Gouveia 27', 35'; Dannett 36'

Umpires:
Gus Soteriades (USA)
Jason King (BAR)

10 August 2010
16:40

Argentina	8–1	Venezuela
G. Luna 4', 13'; Leotta 9', 12'; Celada 21'; Fava 28'; Agudo 35'; Busatto 38'	Report	Y. Hernández 23'

Umpires:
Donny Gobinsingh (TTO)
Gregory Uyttenhove (BEL)

11 August 2010
11:05

Peru	2–8	Canada
Ubillus 20'; Márquez 25'	Report	Roberts 2', 3', 11', 22', 23', 29'; Barber 19'; Barretto 31'

Umpires:
Gary Simmonds (RSA)
Devin Hooper (GUY)

11 August 2010
16:30

Guyana	8–6	Venezuela
France 3', 18', 39'; Bell 28'; Samuels 31', 35'; Dannett 38', 38'	Report	Quiróz 7'; Gamboa 9'; Y. Hernández 11'; Adrian 15', 24', 30'

Umpires:
Jason King (BAR)
Gus Soteriades (USA)

12 August 2010
14:30

Guyana	4–2	Peru
Munroe 6'; Simon 11'; France 18', 35'	Report	Knight 8', 38'

Umpires:
Donny Gobinsingh (TTO)
Jason King (BAR)

12 August 2010
16:40

Canada	4–1	Argentina
Barretto 4'; Roberts 7'; Abu-Ali 14'; Barber 28'	Report	Busatto 39'

Umpires:
Gus Soteriades (USA)
Gary Simmonds (RSA)

13 August 2010
10:05

Peru	1–2	Argentina
Corno 8'	Report	G. Luna 10'; Leotta 31'

Umpires:
Gregory Uyttenhove (BEL)
Gus Soteriades (USA)

13 August 2010
14:25

Venezuela	1–10	Canada
Y. Hernández 36'	Report	Govia 6'; Hignell 12', 37'; Roberts 14', 32'; Teixeira 20'; Barber 27', 28', 39'; Branco 38'

Umpires:
Donny Gobinsingh (TTO)
Devin Hooper (GUY)

==== Pool B ====
Pos	Team	Pld	W	D	L	GF	GA	GD	Pts	Qualification
1	United States	3	2	1	0	20	4	+16	7	Advanced to Semi-Finals
2	Trinidad and Tobago	3	2	1	0	9	3	+6	7	Advanced to Semi-Finals
3	Uruguay	3	0	1	2	2	8	−6	1	
4	Mexico	3	0	1	2	1	17	−16	1	

Source: Pan American Hockey Federation
Rules for classification: 1) points; 2) goal difference; 3) games won; 4) head-to-head result.

9 August 2010
16:35

United States	5–1	Uruguay
S. Harris 3'; P. Harris 13', 14', 36'; Hindy 31'	Report	Asperger 29'

Umpires:
Devin Hooper (GUY)
John Hrystak (CAN)

10 August 2010
15:35

Trinidad and Tobago	4–0	Mexico
Pierre 6'; Govia 7'; Murray 8'; Legerton 42'	Report

Umpires:
Etmar Cerpa (VEN)
Diego Barbas (ARG)

11 August 2010
13:15

Uruguay	1–1	Mexico
M. Tixe 9'	Report	Bórquez 5'

Umpires:
John Hrystak (CAN)
Etmar Cerpa (VEN)

12 August 2010
15:35

Trinidad and Tobago	3–3	United States
Pierre 5'; Legerton 15'; Govia 30'	Report	Krauss 22', 31'; Cota 25'

Umpires:
Diego Barbas (ARG)
Gregory Uyttenhove (BEL)

13 August 2010
13:20

United States	12–0	Mexico
Runzi 10', 15', 38'; P. Harris 14', 25', 36', 37'; Krauss 18', 38'; S. Harris 31', 33'; Schilling 32'	Report

Umpires:
Gary Simmonds (RSA)
Jason King (BAR)

13 August 2010
16:35

Uruguay	0–2	Trinidad and Tobago
	Report	Pierre 3'; Legerton 35'

Umpires:
Etmar Cerpa (VEN)
John Hrystak (CAN)

=== Classification round ===
==== Fifth to ninth place classification ====
Crossover
14 August 2010
Mexico	2
Venezuela	3

Seventh Place
14 August 2010
Peru	2
Venezuela	3

===== Crossover =====
14 August 2010
09:00

Mexico	2–3 (a.e.t.)	Venezuela
Galván 4'; García 26'	Report	Quiróz 7'; Hernández 38', 42'

Umpires:
Devin Hooper (GUY)
Donny Gobinsingh (TTO)

===== Seventh and eighth place =====
14 August 2010
19:00

Peru	2–3 (a.e.t.)	Venezuela
Márquez 18'; Knight 35'	Report	Quiróz 11', 31'; Alvizu 50'

Umpires:
Jason King (BAR)
Diego Barbas (ARG)

===== Fifth and sixth place =====
14 August 2010
11:30

Guyana	2–1 (a.e.t.)	Uruguay
Munroe 40'; France 45'	Report	M. Tixe 40'

Umpires:
Diego Barbas (ARG)
Etmar Cerpa (VEN)

==== First to fourth place classification ====
Semi-finals
14 August 2010
Canada	5
Trinidad and Tobago	1
14 August 2010
United States	2
Argentina	1

Final
15 August 2010
Canada	6
United States	3
Third Place
15 August 2010
Trinidad and Tobago	2
Argentina	4

===== Semi-finals =====
14 August 2010
14:00

Canada	5–1	Trinidad and Tobago
Roberts 14', 17', 35'; Barber 29', 39'	Report	Pierre 6'

Umpires:
Gus Soteriades (USA)
Gary Simmonds (RSA)

14 August 2010
16:30

United States	2–1	Argentina
Li 13'; Runzi 18'	Report	Fava 30'

Umpires:
John Hrytsak (CAN)
Gregory Uyttenhove (BEL)

===== Third and fourth place =====
15 August 2010
10:15

Trinidad and Tobago	2–4	Argentina
Vieira 9'; Govia 24'	Report	Agudo 6'; Fava 7'; Leotta 14'; Celada 39'

Umpires:
John Hrytsak (CAN)
Gus Soteriades (USA)

===== Final =====
15 August 2010
12:45

Canada	6–3	United States
Abu-Ali 2'; Barretto 14', 30'; Hignell 19'; Barber 32'; Govia 32'	Report	P. Harris 2', 19'; Krauss 36'

Umpires:
Gregory Uyttenhove (BEL)
Gary Simmonds (RSA)

== Awards ==
Player of the Tournament	Top Goalscorers	Goalkeeper of the Tournament
(Canada) Jonathan Roberts	(Canada) Jonathan Roberts	(Canada) Gowrishankar Premakanthan

== Statistics ==
=== Final standings ===
Pos	Team	Pld	W	D	L	GF	GA	GD	Pts	Qualification
1st place, gold medalist(s)	Canada	6	6	0	0	44	11	+33	18	Qualified to 2011 FIH Indoor World Cup
2nd place, silver medalist(s)	United States	5	3	1	1	25	11	+14	10	Qualified to 2011 FIH Indoor World Cup
3rd place, bronze medalist(s)	Argentina	6	4	0	2	18	10	+8	12	
4	Trinidad and Tobago	5	2	1	2	12	12	0	7	
5	Guyana	5	3	0	2	17	22	−5	9	
6	Uruguay	4	0	1	3	3	10	−7	1	
7	Venezuela (H)	6	2	0	4	15	35	−20	6	
8	Peru	5	1	0	4	12	18	−6	3	
9	Mexico	4	0	1	3	3	20	−17	1	

Source: Pan American Hockey Federation
(H) Hosts
