= 2003 Men's Indoor Hockey World Cup =

Tournament details
- Host country: Germany
- City: Leipzig
- Dates: 5–9 February
- Teams: 12 (from 4 confederations)

Final positions
- Champions: Germany (1st title)
- Runner-up: Poland
- Third place: France

Tournament statistics
- Matches played: 38
- Goals scored: 372 (9.79 per match)
- Top scorer: (France) Fred Soyez (21 goals)

The 2003 Men's Indoor Hockey World Cup was the first edition of the Men's Indoor Hockey World Cup the quadrennial world championship for men's national indoor hockey teams organized by the International Hockey Federation.

It occurred in February 2003, in Leipzig, Germany. The host nation Germany won both the men's and women's gold medals.

The Eurosport TV channel covered the event, which had good ratings despite the late schedule. The 2015 Men's Indoor Hockey World Cup was also held in Leipzig, Germany. A total of 20 million viewers watched 13 hours broadcast on Eurosport, with ten matches broadcast on live TV. This competition included several countries which are not strong competitors at the outdoor international level.

== Preliminary round ==
=== Pool A ===
Pos	Team	Pld	W	D	L	GF	GA	GD	Pts	Qualification
1	Germany (H)	5	5	0	0	59	13	+46	15	Semi-finals
2	Switzerland	5	3	0	2	37	21	+16	9	Semi-finals
3	Canada	5	2	2	1	24	25	−1	8	Fifth place game
4	Czech Republic	5	2	1	2	34	22	+12	7	Seventh place game
5	Russia	5	1	1	3	10	37	−27	4	Ninth place game
6	New Zealand	5	0	0	5	4	50	−46	0	Eleventh place game

Source: FIH
(H) Hosts

5 February 2003
09:00

Switzerland	9–5	Czech Republic
Keller 11'; Grandchamp 16', 23', 24', 26'; Cavallet 25'; Bircher 32'; Steinemann 40', 40'	Report	Jaros 3'; Marik 13', 13', 18'; Bernátek 29'

Umpires:
Ray O'Connor (IRL)
Henrik Ehlers DEN)

5 February 2003
10:05

New Zealand	0–17	Germany
	Report	Weißenborn 4'; Sunkel 5', 8', 26', 27'; Emmerling 10', 17'; Crone 13', 19', 20'; C. Domke 13', 23'; O. Domke 28'; Michel 32', 33', 39'; Witthaus 34'

Umpires:
Philip Schellekens (NED)
Mark Sandhu (AUS)

5 February 2003
11:10

Russia	3–3	Canada
Kuznetsov 8'; Kholodov 32', 34'	Report	Pereira 5', 16'; Fernandes 6'

Umpires:
David Leiper (SCO)
Andreas Dobritzhofer (AUT)

5 February 2003
15:40

Canada	5–4	Switzerland
Fernandes 22', 24', 37', 40'; Desouza 32'	Report	Gahwiler 15', 31'; Steinemann 25'; Bernhard 26'

Umpires:
Stephan Brooks (ENG)
Steve Simpson (USA)

5 February 2003
16:45

Czech Republic	10–0	New Zealand
Jaros 10'; Marik 12', 22'; Lahoda 18', 36'; Bodnar 25', 37'; Vespalec 26', 39'; Perinka 31'	Report

Umpires:
Pedro Teixeira (POR)
Andreas Dobritzhofer (AUT)

5 February 2003
21:00

Germany	16–0	Russia
Emmerling 3', 14'; Kunz 6', 10', 27'; C. Domke 18'; Eimer 19', 30'; Michel 26', 36'; O. Domke 29'; Sunkel 31', 38', 40'; Witthaus 32'; Weißenborn 33'	Report

Umpires:
Jean-Francois Stappaerts (BEL)
Ray O'Connor (IRL)

6 February 2003
10:40

Canada	7–2	New Zealand
Pereira 2', 32'; Fernandes 11', 18', 28'; D'Souza 16'; Evans 36'	Report	Jones 15'; Cochrane 25'

Umpires:
Mark Sandhu (AUS)
Ray O'Connor (IRL)

6 February 2003
11:45

Czech Republic	3–6	Germany
Vespalec 14'; Lahoda 20', 39'	Report	O. Domke 10', 12', 23'; Sunkel 16', 28'; Kunz 40'

Umpires:
Henrik Ehlers (DEN)
Stephen Brooks (ENG)

6 February 2003
13:00

Russia	0–7	Switzerland
	Report	Bircher 2'; Grandchamp 4', 20'; Bernhard 12', 28'; Steinemann 19'; Wullschleger 26'

Umpires:
Philip Schellekens (NED)
Jean-Francois Stappaerts (BEL)

6 February 2003
17:20

Germany	9–6	Switzerland
Sunkel 1'; Michel 7', 25'; O. Domke 16', 16', 26'; Eimer 21'; Weißenborn 29'; Witthaus 31'	Report	Grandchamp 4', 40'; Bernhard 8', 39'; Gahwiler 13'; Bircher 25'

Umpires:
David Leiper (SCO)
Juan Manuel Requena (ESP)

6 February 2003
18:30

Czech Republic	5–5	Canada
Vespalec 5', 12', 37'; Lahoda 9'; Bernátek 23'	Report	Sandison 13', 24'; D'Abreo 37', 40'; Fernandes 40'

Umpires:
Richard Wolter (GER)
Philip Schellekens (NED)

7 February 2003
09:30

Russia	5–0	New Zealand
Mamoshkin 12', 25', 34'; Jirkov 38', 40'	Report

Umpires:
Stephen Brooks (ENG)
Christian Blasch (GER)

7 February 2003
14:00

Switzerland	11–2	New Zealand
Steinemann 4', 22', 23'; Gahwiler 11', 18', 19'; Grandchamp 14', 21', 21', 34', 38'; Keller 29'	Report	Jones 19'; Burnett 22'

Umpires:
Andreas Dobritzhofer (AUT)
Steve Simpson (USA)

7 February 2003
15:05

Russia	2–11	Czech Republic
Jirkov 6'; Stasiouk 13'	Report	Vespalec 3', 17', 19', 20', 40'; Lahoda 9', 11', 25', 33', 33'; Marik 30'

Umpires:
Richard Wolter (GER)
Juan Manuel Requena (ESP)

7 February 2003
20:00

Germany	11–4	Canada
O. Domke 4', 25'; Kunz 5'; Witthaus 6', 25', 31'; Sunkel 9', 15', 20'; Weißenborn 24'; Emmerling 34'	Report	Desouza 2'; D'Souza 6'; D'Abreo 29'; Fernandes 35'

Umpires:
David Leiper (SCO)
Ray O'Connor (IRL)

=== Pool B ===
Pos	Team	Pld	W	D	L	GF	GA	GD	Pts	Qualification
1	Poland	5	4	0	1	29	13	+16	12	Semi-finals
2	France	5	4	0	1	28	18	+10	12	Semi-finals
3	Netherlands	5	3	0	2	27	15	+12	9	Fifth place game
4	Australia	5	2	1	2	20	20	0	7	Seventh place game
5	South Africa	5	1	1	3	15	28	−13	4	Ninth place game
6	United States	5	0	0	5	7	32	−25	0	Eleventh place game

Source: FIH

5 February 2003
12:15

Netherlands	6–1	South Africa

5 February 2003
13:30

Poland	7–1	United States

5 February 2003
14:35

Australia	5–3	France

5 February 2003
17:50

Netherlands	2–4	Poland

6 February 2003
08:30

South Africa	4–9	France

6 February 2003
09:35

United States	0–4	Australia

6 February 2003
14:05

France	5–3	Netherlands

6 February 2003
15:10

Australia	3–8	Poland

6 February 2003
16:15

South Africa	4–3	United States

7 February 2003
10:35

Poland	6–2	South Africa

7 February 2003
11:40

Netherlands	5–4	Australia

7 February 2003
12:45

France	6–2	United States

7 February 2003
16:10

South Africa	4–4	Australia

7 February 2003
17:15

United States	1–11	Netherlands

7 February 2003
18:30

Poland	4–5	France

== Finals ==
Semifinals

8 February 2003
15:00

Poland	6–5	Switzerland

8 February 2003
16:30

Germany	4–2	France

=== Placement rounds ===
Match for 11th place

8 February 2003
09:00

New Zealand	7–8	United States

Match for 9th place

8 February 2003
10:30

Russia	8–3	South Africa

Match for 7th place

8 February 2003
19:30

Czech Republic	4–6	Australia

Match for 5th place

9 February 2003
10:00

Canada	7–8	Netherlands

Match for 3rd place

9 February 2003
13:00

Switzerland	6–8	France

Match for 1st place

9 February 2003
16:00

Poland	1–7	Germany

== Final standings ==
1. Germany
2. Poland
3. France
4. Switzerland
5. Netherlands
6. Canada
7. Australia
8. Czech Republic
9. Russia
10. South Africa
11. United States
12. New Zealand

== Goalscorers ==
There were 372 goals scored in 38 matches, for an average of 9.79 goals per match.

21 goals

- (France) Frederic Soyez

17 goals

- (Switzerland) Thierry Grandchamp

14 goals

- (Germany) Philip Sunkel
- (Netherlands) Roderick Weusthof

13 goals

- (Czech Republic) Michal Vespalec
- (Germany) Oliver Domke

12 goals

- (Czech Republic) Lukas Lahoda

11 goals

- (Canada) Wayne Fernandes

9 goals

- (Germany) Bjorn Michel
- (Poland) Rafał Grotowski
- (Switzerland) Thomas Gahwiler

8 goals

- (Poland) Pietr Mikula
- (Switzerland) Beni Steinemann

7 goals

- (Australia) Graeme McLennan
- (Germany) Bjoern Emmerling
- (Germany) Matthias Witthaus
- (Netherlands) Richard de Snayer

6 goals

- (Australia) Jonathon Stebbings
- (Canada) Ken Pereira
- (Czech Republic) Roman Marik
- (France) Nicolas Gaillard
- (Poland) Artur Mikula
- (South Africa) Stuart Gower-Jackson
- (Switzerland) Philipp Bernhard

5 goals

- (Australia) Mark Harris
- (France) Matthieu Durchon
- (Germany) Florian Kunz
- (Germany) Tibor Weißenborn
- (Poland) Zbignlew Juszczak
- (Russia) Alexandr Jirkov
- (Russia) Alexei Mamoshkin
- (United States) Steve Danielson

4 goals

- (Australia) David Hicks
- (France) Cedric Dagostino
- (Germany) Christian Domke
- (Poland) Tomasz Choczaj
- (Switzerland) Stefan Bircher

3 goals

- (Canada) Robin D'Abreo
- (Canada) Scott Sandison
- (Germany) Philipp Crone
- (Germany) Christoph Eimer
- (Netherlands) Jeroen van Eijk
- (New Zealand) Tama Jones
- (South Africa) Iain Evans
- (South Africa) Paul Hamblin
- (United States) Pat Harris

2 goals

- (Canada) Wesley D'Souza
- (Canada) John Desouza
- (Czech Republic) Štepan Bernátek
- (Czech Republic) Petr Bodnar
- (Czech Republic) Filip Jaros
- (Netherlands) Toine van Beugen
- (Netherlands) Benjamin van Kessel
- (New Zealand) Darryl Cochrane
- (Poland) Dariusz Rachwalski
- (Russia) Roman Kholodov
- (Russia) Vladislav Kuznetsov
- (Russia) Rafis Nasyrov
- (Russia) Sergei Stasiouk
- (South Africa) Lloyd Clarke
- (South Africa) Shane Morrow
- (Switzerland) Philipp Keller
- (United States) Daniel Dion

1 goal

- (Australia) Anthony Farry
- (Australia) Andrew Fenton
- (Australia) Luke MCkinnon
- (Australia) Graham Watts
- (Canada) Adam Evans
- (Czech Republic) Ales Perinka
- (France) Florent Durchon
- (France) Antoine Gouedard-Comte
- (Netherlands) Olaf Bakker
- (Netherlands) Titus de Greeff
- (Netherlands) Willem Gassner
- (New Zealand) Priyesh Bhana
- (New Zealand) Jason Bradley
- (New Zealand) Brendon Burnett
- (New Zealand) Matthew MacCormick
- (Poland) Slawomir Choczaj
- (Poland) Robert Grzeszczak
- (South Africa) Steven Evans
- (South Africa) Greg Knott
- (Switzerland) Christian Cavallet
- (Switzerland) Fabian Wullschleger
- (United States) Patrick Cota
- (United States) Olaf Maack

Source: FIH

== Results ==
- Die 1. Hallen-Hockey-Weltmeisterschaft ist zu Ende
