= Kei Käppeler =

American field hockey player

Personal information
- Born: 17 June 1997 (age 29) Stuttgart, Germany

Sport
- Sport: Field hockey
- Position: Midfield
Senior career
Years	Team	Caps	Goals
2024–2025	Hampstead & Westminster	-	-
2025–2026	Wimbledon	-	-
National team
Years	Team	Caps	Goals
2015–2017	Germany U–21	20	(1)
2018–	United States	49	(7)
2023–	United States Indoor	11	(2)
Medal record
Men's field hockey
Representing United States
Pan American Games
Bronze medal – third place	2019 Lima	Team
Pan American Cup
Silver medal – second place	2025 Montevideo
Men's indoor hockey
Indoor Pan American Cup
Bronze medal – third place	2024 Calgary

Hans Kei Käppeler (born 17 June 1997) is a German–American international indoor and field hockey player.

== Personal life ==
Käppeler was born and raised in Stuttgart, Germany.

His biological grandparents are Tadaaki Kuwayama and Rakuko Naito, both Japanese artists who resided in New York City. Being residents of the United States, his grandparents gave rise to his American heritage, allowing him to obtain dual citizenship.

His brother Aki also plays international field hockey for the United States.

He has studied at the University of Mannheim, and more recently at University College London.

== Field hockey ==
=== Domestic leagues ===
Käppeler currently competes in the English Hockey League, the top level domestic competition of the England. He has been a member of the Hampstead & Westminster Men's First team since 2019. He has also represented the side in the Euro Hockey League, the top club-level competition hosted by the European Hockey Federation.

He joined Wimbledon for the 2025–26 season.

=== Under–21 ===
From 2015 to 2017, Käppeler was a member of the Germany U–21 side. He made his first appearances for the team during a test series against Switzerland in his home city of Stuttgart. Throughout his junior career, Käppeler amassed 20 caps and scored once.

=== Senior national team ===
Käppeler received his first call-up to the United States national squad in 2018. He was included in the squad for a tour of Europe in the summer of that year. He earned his first senior international cap during a match against Spain in Barcelona.

Throughout his senior career, Käppeler has only medalled with the national squad on one occasion, winning a bronze medal. His medal came at the XVIII Pan American Games in Lima.

As of 2025, Käppeler is still an active member of the senior national team. He was most recently named in the squad for the 2025 Pan American Cup in Montevideo.

Major International Tournaments
The following is a list of major international tournaments Käppeler has competed in throughout his career.

- 2018–19 FIH Series – Bhubaneswar
- 2019 Pan American Games – Lima
- 2022 Pan American Cup – Santiago
- 2023 Pan American Games – Santiago
- 2024–25 FIH Nations Cup II – Muscat
- 2025 Pan American Cup – Montevideo

== Indoor hockey ==
In addition to field hockey, Käppeler has also represented the United States in indoor hockey. He made his first appearances for the United States Indoor team in 2023 at the FIH Indoor World Cup in Pretoria. He also represented the at the 2024 Indoor Pan American Cup in Calgary, where he won a bronze medal.
