= 2024 Men's Indoor Pan American Cup =

Indoor hockey tournament

Tournament details
- Host country: Canada
- City: Calgary
- Dates: 19–22 March
- Teams: 5 (from 1 confederation)
- Venue: Seven Chiefs Sportsplex

Final positions
- Champions: Argentina (2nd title)
- Runner-up: Trinidad and Tobago
- Third place: United States

Tournament statistics
- Matches played: 14
- Goals scored: 123 (8.79 per match)
- Top scorer: (Argentina) Agustin Ceballos (12 goals)

The 2024 Men's Indoor Pan American Cup was the ninth edition of the Men's Indoor Pan American Cup, the quadrennial international men's indoor hockey championship of the Americas, organized by the Pan American Hockey Federation. It was held alongside the women's tournament at the Seven Chiefs Sportsplex in Calgary, Canada from 19 to 22 March 2024.

Argentina were the defending champions, having won their first title at the 2021 edition. They defended their title by defeating Trinidad and Tobago 5–2 in the final. The United States won the bronze medal by defeating Guyana 5–4. The top two teams qualified for the 2025 Men's FIH Indoor Hockey World Cup.

== Teams ==
The following five teams participated in the tournament:

- Argentina
- Canada
- Guyana
- Trinidad and Tobago
- United States

== Preliminary round ==
=== Standings ===
Pos	Team	Pld	W	D	L	GF	GA	GD	Pts	Qualification
1	Argentina	4	4	0	0	37	8	+29	12	Semi-finals
2	United States	4	3	0	1	13	15	−2	9	Semi-finals
3	Trinidad and Tobago	4	2	0	2	17	22	−5	6	Semi-finals
4	Guyana	4	0	1	3	14	22	−8	1	Semi-finals
5	Canada (H)	4	0	1	3	7	21	−14	1	

Source: FIH
Rules for classification: 1) points; 2) matches won; 3) goal difference; 4) goals for; 5) head-to-head result; 6) field goals for.
(H) Hosts

=== Results ===
19 March 2024
11:15

Argentina	9–5	Guyana
	Report

19 March 2024
12:30

Trinidad and Tobago	7–3	Canada
	Report

19 March 2024
17:00

United States	5–3	Guyana
	Report

19 March 2024
18:15

Argentina	8–0	Canada
	Report

20 March 2024
13:45

Trinidad and Tobago	3–4	United States
	Report

20 March 2024
17:00

Canada	3–3	Guyana
	Report

20 March 2024
18:15

Argentina	8–1	United States
	Report

21 March 2024
13:45

Guyana	3–5	Trinidad and Tobago
	Report

21 March 2024
17:00

United States	3–1	Canada
	Report

21 March 2024
18:15

Trinidad and Tobago	2–12	Argentina
	Report

== First to fourth place classification ==
=== Bracket ===
Semi-finals
22 March
United States	4
Trinidad and Tobago	5
22 March
Argentina	10
Guyana	0

Final
22 March
Trinidad and Tobago	2
Argentina	5
Third place
22 March
United States	5
Guyana	4

=== Semi-finals ===
22 March 2024
11:15

United States	4–5	Trinidad and Tobago
	Report

22 March 2024
13:45

Argentina	10–0	Guyana
	Report

=== Third and fourth place ===
22 March 2024
18:15

United States	5–4	Guyana
	Report

=== Final ===
22 March 2024
20:45

Trinidad and Tobago	2–5	Argentina
	Report

== Statistics ==
=== Final standings ===
Pos	Team	Qualification
1st place, gold medalist(s)	Argentina	2025 Indoor World Cup
2nd place, silver medalist(s)	Trinidad and Tobago	2025 Indoor World Cup
3rd place, bronze medalist(s)	United States	
4	Guyana	
5	Canada (H)	

Source: FIH
(H) Host

=== Goalscorers ===
There were 123 goals scored in 14 matches, for an average of 8.79 goals per match.

12 goals

- (Argentina) Agustín Ceballos

11 goals

- (Argentina) Juan Eleicegui

8 goals

- (Argentina) Gastón Rodríguez

7 goals

- (Guyana) Aroydy Branford
- (Trinidad and Tobago) Mickel Pierre
- (Trinidad and Tobago) Jordan Vieira

6 goals

- (Argentina) Nehuen Ayala
- (Argentina) Facundo Navarro Guastelli
- (Guyana) Jamarj Assanah
- (United States) Ajai Dhadwal

5 goals

- (Argentina) Joaquín González
- (United States) Koehl Comiskey

4 goals

- (Trinidad and Tobago) Tariq Marcano

3 goals

- (Argentina) Alfredo Sosa
- (Canada) Leighton De Souza
- (United States) Jeroen Dijkema

2 goals

- (Canada) Jagpreet Singh
- (Guyana) Robert France
- (Trinidad and Tobago) Jordan Reynos
- (Trinidad and Tobago) Akim Toussaint
- (United States) Kei Käppeler
- (United States) Kai Kokolakis
- (United States) Jack Weitzman

1 goal

- (Argentina) Maximiliano Valdes
- (Canada) Flynn Mcculloch
- (Canada) Tarnpreet Singh
- (Guyana) Shakeem Fausette
- (Guyana) Shaquon Favorite
- (Guyana) Tahrea Garnett
- (Trinidad and Tobago) Shaquille Daniel
- (Trinidad and Tobago) Dylan Francis
- (United States) Christian DeAngelis
- (United States) Adam Miller

Source: FIH

== See also ==
- 2024 Women's Indoor Pan American Cup
