= Canada men's national indoor hockey team =

Canada
- Association: Field Hockey Canada
- Confederation: PAHF (Americas)

FIH ranking
- Current: 19

World Cup
- Appearances: 4 (first in 2003)
- Best result: 6th (2003)

Pan American Cup
- Appearances: 6 (first in 2002)
- Best result: 1st (2002, 2005, 2010, 2014)

The Canada men's national indoor hockey team represents Canada at international indoor hockey matches and tournaments.

== Tournament record ==
=== World Cup ===
- 2003 – 6th place
- 2007 – 7th place
- 2011 – 10th place
- 2015 – 12th place

=== Pan American Cup ===
- 2002 – 1st place
- 2005 – 1st place
- 2010 – 1st place
- 2014 – 1st place
- 2017 – 3rd place
- 2021 – 3rd place
- 2024 – Qualified

== See also ==
- Canada women's national indoor hockey team
- Canada men's national field hockey team
