= Miquel Delas =

Spanish field hockey player (born 1984)

Miquel Delàs
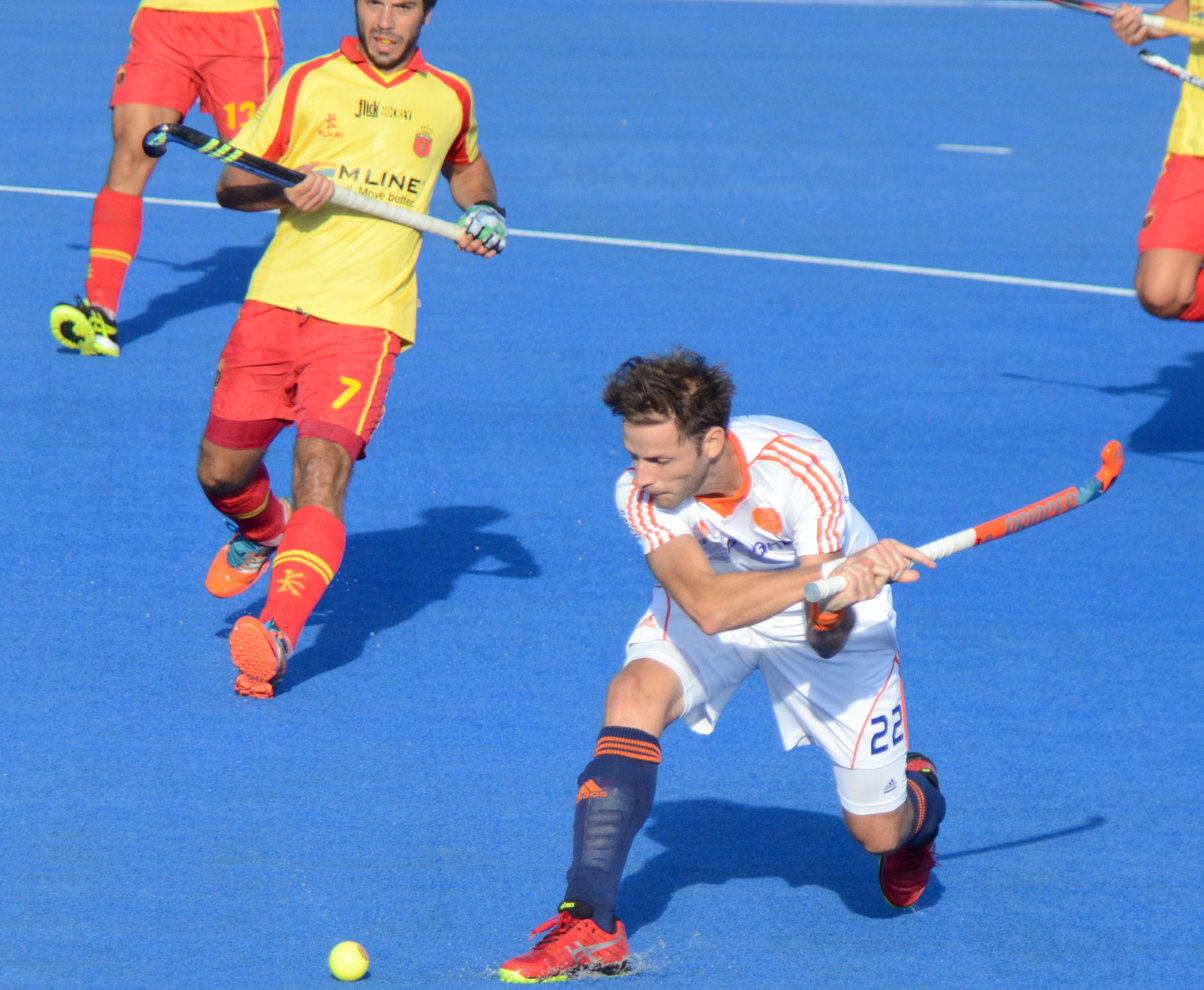

Personal information
- Full name: Miquel Delàs de Andres
- Born: 13 April 1984 (age 42) Barcelona, Spain
- Height: 1.70 m (5 ft 7 in)
- Weight: 72 kg (159 lb)

Sport
- Sport: Field hockey
- Position: Defender / Midfielder
- Club: Barcelona
Youth career
- Team
- –: Barcelona
Senior career
Years	Team	Caps	Goals
2002–2007	Barcelona	-	-
2007–2012	Atlètic Terrassa	-	-
2012–2017	Royal Antwerp	-	-
2017–present	Barcelona	-	-
National team
Years	Team	Caps	Goals
2005–present	Spain	264	(10)
Medal record
Men's field hockey
Representing Spain
EuroHockey Championship
Silver medal – second place	2019 Antwerp
Champions Trophy
Silver medal – second place	2011 Auckland
Bronze medal – third place	2005 Chennai
Bronze medal – third place	2006 Terrassa
Men's indoor hockey
Indoor World Cup
Bronze medal – third place	2007 Vienna
- Updated on 24 July 2021

Miquel Delàs de Andres (born 13 April 1984) is a Spanish field hockey player who plays as a defender or midfielder for FC Barcelona and the Spanish national team.

At the 2012 Summer Olympics, he competed for the national team in the men's tournament. He also competed for the team in the 2016 Summer Olympics tournament.

== Club career ==
Miquel started playing hockey at a really young age at FC Barcelona. He left them in 2007 for Atlètic Terrassa HC because he wanted to win titles. After five seasons with Atlètic, he went to Belgium to play for Royal Antwerp, where he also played for five seasons. After ten years away from his boyhood club, he returned to Barcelona in 2017.

== International career ==
The defender has been playing for the Spanish national team since 2005 and has registered 218 caps since. In 2017, he became the captain of the national team, which he is still today. He was selected for the 2018 World Cup, which was his third World Cup. He only played one game in that tournament because he got injured in the first match against Argentina. In August 2019, he was selected in the Spain squad for the 2019 EuroHockey Championship. They won the silver medal as they lost 5–0 to Belgium in the final. On 25 May 2021, he was selected in the squad for the 2021 EuroHockey Championship.
