= Eduardo Aguilar =

Spanish field hockey player (born 1976)

Personal information
- Full name: Eduardo Aguilar Estrada
- Born: 6 December 1976 (age 49) Puente Genil, Spain
- Height: 173 cm (5 ft 8 in)
- Weight: 71 kg (157 lb)

Sport
- Sport: Field hockey
- Position: Midfielder
Senior career
Years	Team	Caps	Goals
–	Atlético San Sebastián	-	-
National team
Years	Team	Caps	Goals
–	Spain		-
Medal record
Representing Spain
Men's field hockey
Champions Challenge
Gold medal – first place	2003 Johannesburg	Team
Men's indoor field hockey
Indoor World Cup
Bronze medal – third place	2007 Vienna	Team

Eduardo Aguilar Estrada (Note: In this Spanish name, the first or paternal surname is Aguilar and the second or maternal family name is Estrada.) (born 6 December 1976 in Puente Genil, Córdoba) is a field hockey midfielder from Spain. He finished in fourth position with the Men's National Team at the 2004 Summer Olympics in Athens, Greece. He made his international senior debut for the national side at the 1997 Champions Trophy in Adelaide, South Australia. Aguilar played club hockey for Atlético San Sebastián.
