= Thilo Stralkowski =

German field hockey player

Personal information
- Born: 2 May 1987 (age 39) Essen, West Germany

Sport
- Sport: Field hockey
- Position: Forward
- Club: Uhlenhorst Mülheim (Trainer)
Senior career
Years	Team	Caps	Goals
–	Uhlenhorst Mülheim	-	-
National team
Years	Team	Caps	Goals
2011–2014	Germany	78	(34)
2011–2015	Germany (indoor)	20	(34)
Coaching career
- 2020–present: Uhlenhorst Mülheim
Medal record
Representing Germany
Men's field hockey
Olympic Games
Gold medal – first place	2012 London	Team
EuroHockey Championship
Gold medal – first place	2011 Mönchengladbach
Gold medal – first place	2013 Boom
EuroHockey Junior Championship
Silver medal – second place	2006 Prague
Bronze medal – third place	2008 San Sebastián
Men's indoor hockey
Indoor World Cup
Gold medal – first place	2011 Poznań
Bronze medal – third place	2015 Leipzig
EuroHockey Indoor Championship
Gold medal – first place	2012 Leipzig

Thilo Stralkowski (born 2 May 1987) is a German field hockey coach and former player.

At the 2012 Summer Olympics, he competed for the national team in the men's tournament, where they won the gold medal. In 2020 he retired from playing hockey and became the head coach of his club Uhlenhorst Mülheim.
