= 2022 Men's FIH Indoor Hockey World Cup =

Cancelled indoor hockey tournament

Tournament details
- Host country: Belgium
- City: Liège
- Dates: Cancelled
- Teams: 12 (from 5 confederations)
- Venue(s): Country Hall Liège

The 2022 Men's FIH Indoor Hockey World Cup would have been the sixth edition of this tournament and scheduled to be played from 2 to 6 February 2022 in Liège, Belgium. It was originally scheduled for February 2021, but was postponed due to the COVID-19 pandemic.

The tournament was cancelled on 10 January 2022, due to the COVID-19 pandemic.

== Qualification ==
Twelve teams qualified to participate in the tournament. Australia and New Zealand withdrew from the tournament due to the travel restrictions related to the COVID-19 pandemic and were replaced by Namibia and the United States.

Dates	Event	Location	Quotas	Qualifier(s)
15–21 July 2019	2019 Indoor Asia Cup	Chonburi, Thailand	2	Iran; Kazakhstan
17–19 January 2020	2020 EuroHockey Indoor Championship	Berlin, Germany	5	Austria; Czech Republic; Germany; Netherlands; RFHF
8 April 2020	Host nation	—	1	Belgium
16–18 April 2021	2021 Indoor Africa Cup	Durban, South Africa	2	Namibia; South Africa
25–27 June 2021	2021 Indoor Pan American Cup	Spring City, United States	2	Argentina; United States
Cancelled	Oceania Indoor Qualification Tournament	—	0	~~Australia~~; ~~New Zealand~~
Total			12	

== See also ==
- 2022 Women's FIH Indoor Hockey World Cup
