= Hockey 9s =

Field hockey variation

Hockey 9s or Hockey Nines is a variation of the sport of field hockey played at international level. While played on a standard size hockey field, there are a number of variations in its rules, most significantly the reduction of number of players on a team from eleven to nine.

== Rules and field variations ==
Teams are limited to nine players on the field at one time. A match consists of two 15-minute halves, plus multiple golden goal periods of 5 minutes to resolve ties. The game is played on a standard field hockey pitch, the goals are wider than those in eleven-a-side hockey.

== History ==
The nine-a-side game has been played at club level.

== International Hockey 9s tournaments ==
As of 2013 there have been three Hockey 9s tournaments contested by national representative teams.

The inaugural tournament was played in Perth, Western Australia in October 2011. The Australia men's national field hockey team defeated the New Zealand men's national field hockey team in the final by 5 goals to 3.

As of 19 October 2013 the third international Hockey 9s tournament was played in Perth.

== See also ==
- Indoor hockey
