= United States men's national indoor hockey team =

United States
- Association: USA Field Hockey
- Confederation: PAHF (Americas)
- Coach: Mulder
- Assistant coach(es): Aditya Pasarakonda
- Manager: Nigel Traverso
- Captain: Pat Harris

FIH ranking
- Current: 8

World Cup
- Appearances: 3 (first in 2003)
- Best result: 4th (2023)

Pan American Cup
- Appearances: 7 (first in 2002)
- Best result: 1st (2008)

The United States men's national indoor hockey team represents the United States at international indoor hockey matches and tournaments.

== Tournament record ==
=== World Cup ===
- 2003 – 11th place
- 2011 – 11th place
- 2023 – 4th place

=== Pan American Cup ===
- 2002 – (silver)
- 2004 – (silver)
- 2005 – (bronze)
- 2008 – (gold)
- 2010 – (silver)
- 2014 – (silver)
- 2021 – (silver)
- 2024 – (bronze)

=== Nkosi Cup ===
- 2023 – (bronze)
- 2025 – 5th
- 2026 – Qualified

== See also ==
- United States women's national indoor hockey team
- United States men's national field hockey team
