= Argentina men's national indoor hockey team =

Participate in international indoor hockey matches and tournaments

Argentina
- Association: Argentine Hockey Confederation
- Confederation: PAHF (Americas)
- Coach: Massimo Lanzano
- Assistant coach(es): Fabian Perez; Sergio Saade
- Manager: Guillermo Schickendantz
- Captain: Juan Eleicegui

FIH ranking
- Current: 10

World Cup
- Appearances: 1 (first in 2023)
- Best result: 7th (2023)

Pan American Cup
- Appearances: 5 (first in 2008)
- Best result: 1st (2021),(2024)

The Argentina men's national indoor hockey team represents Argentina at international indoor hockey matches and tournaments.

== Tournament record ==
=== World Cup ===
- 2023 – 7th place
- 2025 – Q

=== Pan American Cup ===
- 2008 – 2nd place
- 2010 – 3rd place
- 2014 – 4th place
- 2017 – 2nd place
- 2021 – 1st place
- 2024 – 1st place

== See also ==
- Argentina women's national indoor hockey team
- Argentina men's national field hockey team
