= Trinidad and Tobago men's national indoor hockey team =

Trinidad and Tobago
- Association: Trinidad & Tobago Hockey Board
- Confederation: PAHF (Americas)

FIH ranking
- Current: 17

World Cup
- Appearances: 2 (first in 2007)
- Best result: 10th (2018)

Pan American Cup
- Appearances: 4 (first in 2002)
- Best result: 1st (2017)

The Trinidad and Tobago men's national indoor hockey team represents Trinidad and Tobago at international indoor hockey matches and tournaments.

== Tournament record ==
=== World Cup ===
- 2007 – 12th place
- 2018 – 10th place
- 2025 – 12th place

=== Pan American Cup ===
- 2002 – 3rd place
- 2005 – 2nd place
- 2010 – 4th place
- 2017 – 1st place
- 2021 – Withdrew
- 2024 – Qualified

== See also ==
- Trinidad and Tobago women's national indoor hockey team
- Trinidad and Tobago men's national field hockey team
