= 2015 Men's Indoor Hockey World Cup =

Hockey tournament

Tournament details
- Host country: Germany
- City: Leipzig
- Dates: 4 - 8 February
- Teams: 12 (from 5 confederations)
- Venue: Arena Leipzig

Final positions
- Champions: Netherlands (1st title)
- Runner-up: Austria
- Third place: Germany

Tournament statistics
- Matches played: 46
- Goals scored: 373 (8.11 per match)
- Top scorer: (Germany) Alexander Otte (19 goals)
- Best player: (Austria) Benjamin Stanzl

The 2015 Men's Indoor Hockey World Cup was the fourth edition of this tournament. It was played on 4–8 February 2015 in Leipzig, Germany.

Germany was the three-time defending champion.

The Netherlands defeated Austria 3–2 in the final to win their first title.

== Results ==
The schedule was released on 10 October 2014.

All times are local Central European Time (UTC+02:00)

=== First round ===
==== Pool A ====
Pos	Team	Pld	W	D	L	GF	GA	GD	Pts	Qualification
1	Germany (H)	5	5	0	0	43	19	+24	15	Quarter-finals
2	Austria	5	3	1	1	20	11	+9	10	Quarter-finals
3	Sweden	5	1	2	2	19	25	−6	5	Quarter-finals
4	Iran	5	1	1	3	24	36	−12	4	Quarter-finals
5	Czech Republic	5	0	4	1	10	15	−5	4	
6	Australia	5	0	2	3	13	23	−10	2	

Source: FIH
(H) Hosts

4 February 2015
12:30

Czech Republic	0–0	Australia
	Report

Umpires:
Paweł Linkowski (POL)
Lee Barron (ENG)

4 February 2015
12:45

Germany	9–4	Sweden
Otte 7', 22', 36'; Lietz 14'; Stralkowski 19', 28'; Fürste 31', 40'; Pehlke 32'	Report	Hemvik 2'; Mattsson 9'; Joh. Björkman 21'; Ströby 23'

Umpires:
Adam Barry (AUS)
Geoff Conn (IRL)

4 February 2015
13:45

Austria	7–2	Iran
Körper 11', 20', 22', 32'; Schmidt 15'; Rudofsky 27'; Stanzl 37'	Report	Beiranvand 25'; Bohlooli 26'

Umpires:
Andrés Ortiz (ESP)
Ben Göntgen (GER)

4 February 2015
20:00

Sweden	1–1	Czech Republic
Joh. Björkman 18'	Report	Vacek 30'

Umpires:
Andrés Ortiz (ESP)
David Sweetman (SCO)

4 February 2015
20:15

Germany	11–3	Iran
Fürste 1', 3', 9', 22'; Ress 4'; Korn 7', 26'; Stralkowski 10', 12'; Pehlke 25', 31'	Report	Beiranvand 13', 26'; Aroei 17'

Umpires:
Donny Gobinsingh (TRI)
Paweł Linkowski (POL)

4 February 2015
21:30

Austria	3–1	Australia
Stanzl 3'; Schmidt 6'; Körper 17'	Report	Backhus 39'

Umpires:
Geoff Conn (IRL)
Jonas van't Hek (NED)

5 February 2015
12:30

Australia	5–8	Iran
H. Ogilvie 9'; Backhus 32'; F. Ogilvie 34', 39'; Sinclair 40'	Report	Taherirad 10', 36', 37'; Aroei 28'; Beiranvand 29'; Bohlooli 32', 40'; Bohlouli 38'

Umpires:
Gregory Uyttenhove (BEL)
David Sweetman (CAN)

5 February 2015
12:45

Czech Republic	4–9	Germany
Průcha 3'; Plochý 26'; Kyndl 36', 39'	Report	Herzbruch 5'; Fürste 11'; Otte 14', 23', 30'; Hauke 16', 40'; Stralkowski 27', 29'

Umpires:
Geoff Conn (IRL)
Hassan Abazari (IRN)

5 February 2015
14:00

Sweden	1–4	Austria
Joh. Björkman 26'	Report	Schmidt 20', 39'; Körper 24'; Uher 27'

Umpires:
Lee Barron (ENG)
Donny Gobinsingh (TRI)

5 February 2015
20:00

Australia	3–3	Sweden
MacKinnon 16', 30'; F. Ogilvie 26'	Report	Lundqvist 5'; Joa. Björkman 8'; Hemvik 33'

Umpires:
Ben Göntgen (GER)
Hassan Abazari (IRN)

5 February 2015
20:15

Austria	4–5	Germany
Schmidt 25'; Uher 26', 40'; Körper 36'	Report	Fürste 5', 34'; Herzbruch 7'; Otte 17'; Stralkowski 24'

Umpires:
Jonas van't Hek (NED)
Paweł Linkowski (POL)

5 February 2015
21:15

Iran	3–3	Czech Republic
Beiranvand 15'; Asnaashari 18'; Noraniyan 40'	Report	Piterák 5'; Plochý 17'; Vacek 36'

Umpires:
Donny Gobinsingh (TRI)
Michael Eilmer (AUT)

6 February 2015
14:00

Czech Republic	2–2	Austria
Koryt'ák 35'; Vudmaska 39'	Report	Eitenberger 17'; Körper 40'

Umpires:
Gregory Uyttenhove (BEL)
Andrés Ortiz (ESP)

6 February 2015
15:00

Iran	8–10	Sweden
Bohlouli 17'; Beiranvand 23', 32', 35', 38'; Asnaashari 24', 33'; Noraniyan 38'	Report	Joa. Björkman 10', 31', 34'; Hemvik 20'; Joh. Björkman 21', 28', 29', 38', 39'; Ströby 39'; Mattsson 40'

Umpires:
Jonas van't Hek (NED)
Paweł Linkowski (POL)

6 February 2015
15:15

Germany	9–4	Australia
Otte 8', 9', 15'; Pehlke 10'; Stralkowski 13', 40'; Fürste 20'; Weinke 30'; Hauke 39'	Report	MacKinnon 2', 26'; F. Ogilvie 12'; Beaton 17'

Umpires:
David Sweetman (CAN)
Lee Barron (ENG)

==== Pool B ====
Pos	Team	Pld	W	D	L	GF	GA	GD	Pts	Qualification
1	Russia	5	4	1	0	26	15	+11	13	Quarter-finals
2	Netherlands	5	3	1	1	20	11	+9	10	Quarter-finals
3	Poland	5	2	3	0	26	18	+8	9	Quarter-finals
4	Switzerland	5	2	1	2	17	14	+3	7	Quarter-finals
5	Canada	5	0	1	4	10	20	−10	1	
6	South Africa	5	0	1	4	11	32	−21	1	

Source: FIH

4 February 2015
13:45

Netherlands	3–1	Canada
Leijs 13'; Kellerman 21'; Van de Peppel 38'	Report	Noronha 1'

Umpires:
Gregory Uyttenhove (BEL)
Donny Gobinsingh (TRI)

4 February 2015
15:00

Russia	4–3	Switzerland
Volkov 3'; Spichkovskiy 36'; Nikitin 38'; Proskuryakov 39'	Report	Steffen 8', 18'; Kloter 13'

Umpires:
David Sweetman (CAN)
Hassan Abazari (IRN)

4 February 2015
15:15

Poland	8–3	South Africa
Zimnicki 6', 21'; Dutkiewicz 8'; Żywiczka 18'; Makowski 31'; Górny 33', 38'; Bratkowski 34'	Report	Haley 4', 26'; Domleo 33'

Umpires:
Jonas van't Hek (NED)
Michael Eilmer (AUT)

4 February 2015
21:15

Russia	2–1	Canada
Khairullin 13'; Mokrousov 14'	Report	Noronha 16'

Umpires:
Michael Eilmer (AUT)
Lee Barron (ENG)

4 February 2015
22:30

Poland	4–4	Switzerland
Dutkiewicz 9', 37'; Górny 17'; Weide 33'	Report	Keller 5', 22', 34'; Kloter 7'

Umpires:
Gregory Uyttenhove (BEL)
Ben Göntgen (GER)

4 February 2015
22:45

South Africa	0–5	Netherlands
	Report	Kellerman 3', 34', 36'; Van de Peppel 11'; Tigges 18'

Umpires:
Adam Barry (AUS)
Hassan Abazari (IRN)

5 February 2015
13:45

South Africa	2–10	Russia
Abbott 6'; Fairweather 29'	Report	Khairullin 9', 38', 40', 40'; Likov 20', 26', 27', 33', 37'; Mokrousov 39'

Umpires:
Ben Göntgen (GER)
Paweł Linkowski (POL)

5 February 2015
15:00

Netherlands	3–3	Poland
Kranstuber 12'; Kellerman 14', 23'	Report	Górny 30', 34'; Makowski 33'

Umpires:
Andrés Ortiz (ESP)
Michael Eilmer (AUT)

5 February 2015
15:15

Canada	0–4	Switzerland
	Report	Kloter 20'; Richner 24'; Steffen 29'; Keller 31'

Umpires:
Jonas van't Hek (NED)
Adam Barry (AUS)

5 February 2015
21:30

Canada	5–5	South Africa
Noronha 11', 15', 38'; Roberts 23'; Pereira 37'	Report	Isaac 1'; Jones 5'; Geldenhuys 10', 29'; Fairweather 27'

Umpires:
Geoff Conn (IRL)
Andrés Ortiz (ESP)

5 February 2015
22:30

Russia	5–5	Poland
Likov 26'; Proskuryakov 29', 40'; Khairullin 29'; Nikitin 32'	Report	Zimnicki 4'; Dutkiewicz 8'; Majchrzak 21'; Górny 24'; Żywiczka 40'

Umpires:
David Sweetman (SCO)
Adam Barry (AUS)

5 February 2015
22:45

Switzerland	2–5	Netherlands
Richner 15'; Kloter 35'	Report	Tigges 2', 17'; Kranstuber 20'; Leijs 23'; Van de Peppel 24'

Umpires:
Gregory Uyttenhove (BEL)
Lee Barron (ENG)

6 February 2015
12:30

Poland	6–3	Canada
Dutkiewicz 6'; Górny 7', 21'; Majchrzak 8'; Weide 20', 31', 38'	Report	Roberts 18'; Fernandes 21'; Barretto 29'

Umpires:
Hassan Abazari (IRN)
Donny Gobinsingh (TRI)

6 February 2015
12:45

Netherlands	4–5	Russia
Sweering 7'; Kellerman 9', 15'; Kranstuber 27'	Report	Zhirkov 12', 21', 40'; Volkov 20'; Proskuryakov 37'

Umpires:
Michael Eilmer (AUT)
Geoff Conn (IRL)

6 February 2015
13:45

Switzerland	4–1	South Africa
Greder 6'; Keller 10', 40'; Wullschleger 14'	Report	Shrives 29'

Umpires:
Adam Barry (AUS)
Ben Göntgen (GER)

=== Ninth to twelfth place classification ===
9–12th place semi-finals
6 February
Czech Republic	4
South Africa	2
6 February
Canada	3
Australia	6

Ninth place
7 February
Czech Republic	6
Australia	4
Eleventh place
7 February
South Africa	2
Canada	1

==== 9–12th place semi-finals ====
6 February 2015
19:15

Czech Republic	4–2	South Africa
Kyndl 5'; Vacek 19', 39'; Vudmaska 20'	Report	Geldenhuys 20'; Fairweather 36'

Umpires:
David Sweetman (SCO)
Michael Eilmer (AUT)

6 February 2015
20:45

Canada	3–6	Australia
Pereira 7', 23'; Bath 16'	Report	H. Ogilvie 14', 33'; MacKinnon 26', 39'; Beaton 35'; Croke 40'

Umpires:
Andrés Ortiz (ESP)
Ben Göntgen (GER)

==== Eleventh and twelfth place ====
7 February 2015
15:45

South Africa	2–1	Canada
Haley 19'; Fairweather 34'	Report	Pereira 3'

Umpires:
Adam Barry (AUS)
Andrés Ortiz (ESP)

==== Ninth and tenth place ====
7 February 2015
17:15

Czech Republic	6–4	Australia
Plochý 2', 21', 30'; Kyndl 3'; Vacek 8', 37'	Report	Beaton 17', 33'; H. Ogilvie 30'; K. Ogilvie 38'

Umpires:
Paweł Linkowski (POL)
Donny Gobinsingh (TRI)

=== Second round ===
Quarter-finals
7 February
Germany	11
Switzerland	2
7 February
Netherlands	5
Sweden	3
7 February
Austria	5
Poland	1
7 February
Russia	5
Iran	8

Semi-finals
7 February
Germany	4 (1)
Netherlands (s.o.)	4 (2)
7 February
Austria	7
Iran	4

Final
8 February
Netherlands	3
Austria	2
Third place
8 February
Germany	13
Iran	2

Fifth to eighth place

5–8th place semi-finals
7 February
Switzerland	3
Sweden	4
7 February
Poland	4
Russia	6

Fifth place
8 February
Sweden	1
Russia	3
Seventh place
8 February
Switzerland	4 (1)
Poland (s.o.)	4 (2)

==== Quarter-finals ====
7 February 2015
09:00

Austria	5–1	Poland
Körper 18', 38'; Schmidt 28'; Hasun 33'; Stanzl 40'	Report	Dutkiewicz 1'

Umpires:
Jonas van't Hek (NED)
Geoff Conn (IRL)

7 February 2015
10:30

Netherlands	5–3	Sweden
Kellerman 3'; Van de Peppel 17', 30'; Van Dijk 26'; Tigges 36'	Report	Joh. Björkman 31'; Eliasson 38'; Hemvik 40'

Umpires:
Lee Barron (ENG)
Adam Barry (AUS)

7 February 2015
12:00

Germany	11–2	Switzerland
Fürste 4', 10', 33', 34'; Stralkowski 11', 40'; Otte 15', 21'; Lietz 16'; Herzbruch 35'; Pehlke 39'	Report	Steimer 8'; Greder 20'

Umpires:
Paweł Linkowski (POL)
Michael Eilmer (AUT)

7 February 2015
13:30

Russia	5–8	Iran
Zhirkov 4'; Proskuryakov 5'; Volkov 24'; Spichkovskiy 36'; Nikitin 39'	Report	Aroei 6', 21', 40'; Asnaashari 7', 9', 38'; Beiranvand 7', 37'

Umpires:
Ben Göntgen (GER)
Gregory Uyttenhove (BEL)

==== Fifth to eighth place classification ====
===== 5–8th place semifinals =====
7 February 2015
18:45

Switzerland	3–4	Sweden
Michel 19'; Steimer 36'; Keller 38'	Report	Joh. Björkman 5'; Hemvik 18', 22', 34'

Umpires:
Lee Barron (ENG)
Hassan Abazari (IRN)

7 February 2015
20:15

Poland	4–6	Russia
Górny 3'; Żywiczka 11'; Weide 22', 38'	Report	Zhirkov 6'; Volkov 14'; Proskuryakov 29'; Spichkovskiy 32', 34'; Likov 40'

Umpires:
David Sweetman (SCO)
Michael Eilmer (AUT)

===== Seventh and eighth place =====
8 February 2015
08:45

Switzerland	4–4	Poland
Schneider 17'; Keller 15', 29'; Kloter 17'	Report	Górny 2'; Majchrzak 30'; Weide 36'; Żywiczka 40'
Penalties
Schneider (penalty shoot-out missed); Richner (penalty shoot-out scored); Wullschleger (penalty shoot-out missed)	1–2	(penalty shoot-out scored) Górny; (penalty shoot-out scored) Żywiczka

Umpires:
Ben Göntgen (GER)
Geoff Conn (IRL)

===== Fifth and sixth place =====
8 February 2015
08:30

Sweden	1–3	Russia
Hemvik 17'	Report	Spichkovskiy 23', 29'; Mokrousov 33'

Umpires:
Jonas van't Hek (NED)
Gregory Uyttenhove (BEL)

==== First to fourth place classification ====
===== Semi-finals =====
7 February 2015
19:00

Germany	4–4	Netherlands
Otte 17', 40'; Stralkowski 32'; Ress 39'	Report	Tigges 1'; Van Dijk 7'; Kellerman 8', 18'
Penalties
Hauke (penalty shoot-out scored); Fürste (penalty shoot-out missed); Pehlke (penalty shoot-out missed)	1–2	(penalty shoot-out scored) Tigges; (penalty shoot-out scored) Van de Peppel; (penalty shoot-out missed) Rohof

Umpires:
Geoff Conn (IRL)
Gregory Uyttenhove (BEL)

7 February 2015
20:30

Austria	7–4	Iran
Hasun 3'; Uher 7'; Eitenberger 20'; Körper 22', 26', 30', 39'	Report	Bohlooli 27'; Beiranvand 31'; Noraniyan 33', 34'

Umpires:
Jonas van't Hek (NED)
Ben Göntgen (GER)

===== Third and fourth place =====
8 February 2015
11:30

Germany	13–2	Iran
Hauke 2', 31'; Otte 4', 30', 37', 39', 40'; Korn 5'; Fürste 18'; Stralkowski 20', 35'; Herzbruch 29'; Pehlke 33'	Report	Noraniyan 1'; Bohlooli 17'

Umpires:
Adam Barry (AUS)
Michael Eilmer (AUT)

===== Final =====
8 February 2015
14:30

Netherlands	3–2	Austria
Kellerman 5'; Tigges 14'; Van de Peppel 23'	Report	Uher 20'; Eitenberger 36'

Umpires:
Paweł Linkowski (POL)
Lee Barron (ENG)

== Final standings ==
1. Netherlands
2. Austria
3. Germany
4. Iran
5. Russia
6. Sweden
7. Poland
8. Switzerland
9. Czech Republic
10. Australia
11. South Africa
12. Canada

== Awards ==
- Most Valuable Player: Benjamin Stanzl (AUT)
- Top Scorer: Alexander Otte (GER)
- Best Goalkeeper: Laurens Goedegebuure (NED)
- Best U21 Player: Timm Herzbruch (GER)

== See also ==
- 2015 Women's Indoor Hockey World Cup
