= Ken Pereira =

Canadian field hockey player

Personal information
- Born: July 12, 1973 (age 52) Toronto, Ontario
Medal record
Representing Canada
Men's field hockey
Pan American Games
Gold medal – first place	1999 Winnipeg	Team
Gold medal – first place	2007 Rio de Janeiro	Team
Silver medal – second place	1995 Mar del Plata	Team
Silver medal – second place	2003 Santo Domingo	Team
Silver medal – second place	2011 Guadalajara	Team
Men's indoor hockey
Indoor Pan American Cup
Bronze medal – third place	2021 Spring City

Kenneth Pereira (born July 12, 1973 in Toronto, Ontario) is a field hockey midfielder from Canada. He was a member of the Canadian field hockey team at the Summer Olympics in 2000 and 2008. Pereira has also been on several Commonwealth Games and Pan American Games teams, winning two gold medals in the latter competition in 1999 and 2007. In the 1999 Pan American Games gold-medal match against Argentina, the only goal in Canada's win was posted by Pereira.
