= Mickel Pierre =

Trinidad and Tobago field hockey player

Medal record

Representing Trinidad and Tobago

Men's field hockey

Pan American Cup
Bronze medal – third place	2013 Brampton	

Central American and Caribbean Games
Silver medal – second place	2014 Veracruz	Team
Bronze medal – third place	2018 Barranquilla	Team

Men's indoor hockey

Indoor Pan American Cup
Gold medal – first place	2017 Georgetown	

Mickel Pierre (born March 13, 1988, in Arouca, Trinidad and Tobago), is a field hockey player who plays in the midfielder position.

He has represented Trinidad and Tobago internationally at the Commonwealth Games, Pan American Games and Pan American Cup.

Pierre has played club hockey for Canterbury.
