= 2005 Men's Indoor Pan American Cup =

Indoor hockey tournament

Tournament details
- Host country: Canada
- City: Kitchener
- Dates: 9–11 December
- Teams: 5 (from 1 confederation)
- Venue: RIM Park

Final positions
- Champions: Canada (2nd title)
- Runner-up: Trinidad and Tobago
- Third place: United States

Tournament statistics
- Matches played: 14
- Goals scored: 147 (10.5 per match)
- Top scorer: (Canada) Wayne Fernandes (15 goals)

The 2005 Indoor Pan American Cup was the third edition of the Indoor Pan American Cup. It were held from 9 to 11 December 2005 in Kitchener, Canada. The men's tournament had five teams, while the women's tournament featured four teams. Canada (men and women) and Trinidad & Tobago (men) were qualified for the 2007 Men's and Women's Hockey World Cup.

All times are local (UTC−04:00).

== Results ==
=== Pool matches ===
Pos	Team	Pld	W	D	L	GF	GA	GD	Pts	Qualification
1	Canada (H)	4	4	0	0	41	16	+25	12	Semi-finals
2	Trinidad and Tobago	4	3	0	1	31	15	+16	9	Semi-finals
3	United States	4	2	0	2	13	18	−5	6	Semi-finals
4	Guyana	4	1	0	3	18	28	−10	3	Semi-finals
5	Venezuela	4	0	0	4	6	32	−26	0	

Source: PAHF
(H) Hosts

9 December 2005
09:00

Trinidad and Tobago	7–3	Venezuela
	Report

9 December 2005
10:00

United States	4–2	Guyana
	Report

9 December 2005
12:00

United States	6–2	Venezuela
	Report

9 December 2005
12:30

Canada	13–7	Guyana
	Report

9 December 2005
16:30

Venezuela	0–14	Canada
	Report

9 December 2005
17:30

United States	0–8	Trinidad and Tobago
	Report

10 December 2005
08:00

Canada	8–6	Trinidad and Tobago
	Report

10 December 2005
09:00

Venezuela	1–5	Guyana
	Report

10 December 2005
11:30

Trinidad and Tobago	10–4	Guyana
	Report

10 December 2005
12:00

Canada	6–3	United States
	Report

=== First to fourth place classification ===
Semi-finals
10 December
Canada	6
Guyana	2
10 December
Trinidad and Tobago (a.e.t.)	5
United States	4

Final
11 December
Canada	5
Trinidad and Tobago	3
Third place
11 December
Guyana	6
United States (a.e.t.)	7

==== Semi-finals ====
10 December 2005
16:30

Canada	6–2	Guyana
	Report

10 December 2005
18:00

Trinidad and Tobago	5–4 (a.e.t.)	United States
	Report

==== Third and fourth place ====
11 December 2005
08:00

Guyana	6–7 (a.e.t.)	United States
	Report

==== Final ====
11 December 2005
11:30

Canada	5–3	Trinidad and Tobago
	Report

== Final standings ==
Pos	Team	Qualification
1	Canada (H)	2007 Indoor World Cup
2	Trinidad and Tobago	2007 Indoor World Cup
3	United States	
4	Guyana	
5	Venezuela	

Source: PAHF
(H) Host

== See also ==
- 2005 Women's Indoor Pan American Cup
