= 2017 Men's Indoor Pan American Cup =

Indoor hockey tournament

Tournament details
- Host country: Guyana
- City: Georgetown
- Dates: 16–21 October
- Teams: 6 (from 1 confederation)
- Venue: Cliff Anderson Sports Hall

Final positions
- Champions: Trinidad and Tobago (1st title)
- Runner-up: Argentina
- Third place: Canada

Tournament statistics
- Matches played: 18
- Goals scored: 161 (8.94 per match)
- Top scorer: (Canada) Jonathan Roberts (14 goals)
- Best player: (Canada) Jonathan Roberts

The 2017 Men's Indoor Pan American Cup was the seventh edition of the Men's Indoor Pan American Cup, the quadrennial international men's indoor hockey championship of the Americas organized by the Pan American Hockey Federation. It was held alongside the women's tournament in Georgetown, Guyana from 16 to 21 October 2017.

The winners of the tournament qualified for the 2018 Men's and Women's Hockey World Cup respectively.

== Results ==
All times are local (UTC−04:00).

=== Pool matches ===
Pos	Team	Pld	W	D	L	GF	GA	GD	Pts	Qualification
1	Trinidad and Tobago	5	5	0	0	37	11	+26	15	Advance to Final
2	Argentina	5	4	0	1	29	10	+19	12	Advance to Final
3	Canada	5	3	0	2	32	18	+14	9	Third place game
4	Guyana (H)	5	2	0	3	23	19	+4	6	Third place game
5	Barbados	5	1	0	4	12	28	−16	3	Fifth place game
6	Mexico	5	0	0	5	4	51	−47	0	Fifth place game

Source: FIH
(H) Hosts

16 October 2017
13:45

Canada	10–0	Mexico
	Report

Umpires:
Bart de Liefde (NED)
Diego Barbas (ARG)

16 October 2017
15:00

Guyana	5–4	Barbados
	Report

Umpires:
Donny Gobinsingh (TTO)
Alex Miles (CAN)

16 October 2017
18:45

Argentina	2–5	Trinidad and Tobago
	Report

Umpires:
Devin Hooper (GUY)
Gus Soteriades (USA)

17 October 2017
14:15

Canada	6–1	Barbados
	Report

Umpires:
Diego Barbas (ARG)
Jonathan Altamirano (MEX)

17 October 2017
16:45

Guyana	0–4	Trinidad and Tobago
	Report

Umpires:
Bart de Liefde (NED)
Gus Soteriades (USA)

17 October 2017
19:15

Mexico	0–12	Argentina
	Report

Umpires:
Devin Hooper (GUY)
Shane Lewis (BAR)

18 October 2017
15:15

Trinidad and Tobago	8–2	Barbados
	Report

Umpires:
Alex Miles (CAN)
Devin Hooper (GUY)

18 October 2017
17:45

Mexico	0–12	Guyana
	Report

Umpires:
Diego Barbas (ARG)
Shane Lewis (BAR)

18 October 2017
20:15

Argentina	5–3	Canada
	Report

Umpires:
Bart de Liefde (NED)
Donny Gobinsingh (TTO)

19 October 2017
15:15

Trinidad and Tobago	13–2	Mexico
	Report

Umpires:
Devin Hooper (GUY)
Alex Miles (CAN)

19 October 2017
20:15

Guyana	5–8	Canada
	Report

Umpires:
Gus Soteriades (USA)
Shane Lewis (BAR)

19 October 2017
21:30

Barbados	1–7	Argentina
	Report

Umpires:
Donny Gobinsingh (TTO)
Jonathan Altamirano (MEX)

20 October 2017
15:45

Canada	5–7	Trinidad and Tobago
	Report

Umpires:
Diego Barbas (ARG)
Bart de Liefde (NED)

20 October 2017
17:00

Barbados	4–2	Mexico
	Report

Umpires:
Donny Gobinsingh (TTO)
Alex Miles (CAN)

20 October 2017
18:15

Argentina	3–1	Guyana
	Report

Umpires:
Gus Soteriades (USA)
Jonathan Altamirano (MEX)

=== Classification matches ===
==== Fifth and sixth place ====
21 October 2017
13:20

Barbados	6–4	Mexico
	Report

Umpires:
Donny Gobinsingh (TTO)
Diego Barbas (ARG)

==== Third and fourth place ====
21 October 2017
16:10

Canada	5–2	Guyana
	Report

Umpires:
Shane Lewis (BAR)
Jonathan Altamirano (MEX)

==== Final ====
21 October 2017
19:00

Trinidad and Tobago	7–0	Argentina
	Report

Umpires:
Bart de Liefde (NED)
Gus Soteriades (USA)

=== Final standings ===
Qualified for the 2018 World Cup

Rank	Team
1st place, gold medalist(s)	Trinidad and Tobago
2nd place, silver medalist(s)	Argentina
3rd place, bronze medalist(s)	Canada
4	Guyana
5	Barbados
6	Mexico

== See also ==
- 2017 Men's Pan American Cup (field hockey)
- 2017 Women's Indoor Pan American Cup
