= 2011 Men's Indoor Hockey World Cup =

International tournament in Poznań, Poland

- Official logo

Tournament details
- Host country: Poland
- City: Poznań
- Dates: 8 February–13 February
- Teams: 12 (from 5 confederations)
- Venue: Poznań International Fair Exhibition Hall

Final positions
- Champions: Germany (3rd title)
- Runner-up: Poland
- Third place: Austria

Tournament statistics
- Matches played: 38
- Goals scored: 288 (7.58 per match)
- Top scorer: (Netherlands) Robert Tigges (16 goals)
- Best player: (Poland) Dariusz Rachwalski

The 2011 Men's Indoor Hockey World Cup was the third edition of the Men's Indoor Hockey World Cup for men. It was played from 8 February through 13 February 2011 in Poznań, Poland. For the first time in history, teams from five continents were represented.

Germany was the two-time defending champion and won it for the third time.

== Results ==
=== Pools ===
==== Pool A ====
Team	Pld	W	D	L	GF	GA	GD	Pts
Germany	5	4	0	1	53	11	+42	12
Poland	5	4	0	1	25	7	+18	12
Netherlands	5	4	0	1	29	12	+17	12
Australia	5	2	0	3	17	20	−3	6
Canada	5	1	0	4	10	31	−21	3
Namibia	5	0	0	5	2	55	−53	0

8 February 2011
15:00

Germany	18–0	Namibia
Deecke 1', 11', 21', 24', 34'; Weß 7', 26', 34'; Hauke 10'; Stralkowski 15', 15', 35', 35'; Fürste 17', 38'; Zeller 23', 32'; Witthaus 31'	Report

Umpires:
Gus Soteriades (USA)
Michael Soukup (CZE)

8 February 2011
18:45

Poland	3–1	Australia
Dutkiewicz 9'; Górny 20', 32'	Report	Govers 3'

Umpires:
Ged Curran (SCO)
Andrew Kennedy (ENG)

8 February 2011
18:45

Netherlands	5–1	Canada
Tigges 19', 21'; W. Hertzberger 31'; Pruyser 39', 40'	Report	Roberts 30'

Umpires:
Andy Mair (SCO)
Gregory Uyttenhove (BEL)

9 February 2011
15:00

Germany	11–2	Australia
Witthaus 5'; Fürste 6'; Stralkowski 9', 27', 27', 39'; Zeller 12'; Deecke 15', 31', 35'; Müller 39'	Report	Poulton 22'; Swann 28'

Umpires:
Andy Mair (SCO)
Gary Simmonds (RSA)

9 February 2011
15:00

Namibia	0–13	Netherlands
	Report	Pruyser 3', 38' van de Peppel 12'; Engelkens 13', 32'; Tigges 17', 17', 25', 26', 28', 36'; M. Hertzberger 23'; Rohof 31'

Umpires:
John Hrytsak (CAN)
Pawel Linkowski (POL)

9 February 2011
20:00

Poland	7–1	Canada
Mikuła 1', 6'; Szyplik 3'; Makowski 6', 13'; Marcinkowski 26', 31'	Report	Roberts 34'

Umpires:
Roel van Eert (NED)
Gregory Uyttenhove (BEL)

10 February 2011
11:15

Netherlands	5–8	Germany
M. Hertzberger 3', 6'; Rohof 8'; Pruyser 16'; Tigges 39'	Report	Witthaus 1', 21', 31'; Fürste 9'; Weß 17'; Stralkowski 20'; Zeller 22'; Deecke 32'

Umpires:
Gary Simmonds (RSA)
Gus Soteriades (USA)

10 February 2011
12:30

Canada	1–5	Australia
Teixeira 10'	Report	Mackinnon 8', 21'; Beaton 11'; Swann 11'; Poulton 23'

Umpires:
Mikael Mattsson (SWE)
Andrew Kennedy (ENG)

10 February 2011
13:45

Namibia	0–10	Poland
	Report	Mikuła 4'; Dutkiewitz 9', 19'; Szyplik 12', 35'; Rachwalski 13', 24', 26'; Marcinkowski 30'; Górny 36'

Umpires:
Andy Mair (SCO)
Gregory Uyttenhove (BEL)

10 February 2011
17:30

Australia	1–3	Netherlands
Beaton 37'	Report	Tigges 2', 4', 19'

Umpires:
John Hrystak (CAN)
Gary Simmonds (RSA)

10 February 2011
18:45

Canada	6–0	Namibia
Teixeira 5'; Bath 18', 30'; Roberts 20', 23'; Barber 23'	Report

Umpires:
Gus Soteriades (USA)
Michael Soukup (CZE)

10 February 2011
20:00

Poland	3–2	Germany
Rachwalski 16', 24'; Szyplik 34'	Report	Zeller 38'; Stralkowski 39'

Umpires:
Ged Curran (SCO)
Roel van Eert (NED)

11 February 2011
17:30

Germany	14–1	Canada
Deecke 1'; Woesch 14'; Witthaus 15', 21', 33'; Fürste 19', 20', 27', 30'; Zeller 25', 34'; Stralkowski 25', 40'; Arnold 39'	Report	Ali 18'

Umpires:
Michael Soukup (CZE)
Mikael Mattsson (SWE)

11 February 2011
18:45

Australia	8–2	Namibia
Govers 7', 14'; Beaton 12', 16', 33'; Mackinnon 24'; Bausor 37'; Swann 39'	Report	Kotze 6'; Prosser 20'

Umpires:
John Hrytsak (CAN)
Gus Soteriades (USA)

11 February 2011
20:00

Netherlands	3–2	Poland
Hertzberger 14'; Timman 29'; Tigges 40'	Report	Szyplik 19'; Rachwalski 38'

Umpires:
Andy Mair (SCO)
Ged Curran (SCO)

==== Pool B ====
Team	Pld	W	D	L	GF	GA	GD	Pts
Austria	5	3	1	1	14	5	+9	10
Russia	5	3	1	1	17	14	+3	10
England	5	3	0	2	15	13	+2	9
Czech Republic	5	2	2	1	17	10	+7	8
Iran	5	2	0	3	21	21	0	6
United States	5	0	0	5	7	28	−21	0

8 February 2011
12:30

Russia	6–2	United States
Zhirkov 4'; Platonov 5', 27', 28'; Golubev`a 12'; Azarov 21'	Report	Harris 11'; Krauss 40'

Umpires:
Juan Manuel Requena (ESP)
Pawel Linkowski (POL)

8 February 2011
13:45

Austria	5–1	Iran
Stanzl 5', 38'; Greutter 6'; Monghy 25'; Proksch 30'	Report	Aroei 35'

Umpires:
Gary Simmonds (RSA)
John Hrystak (CAN)

8 February 2011
16:15

Czech Republic	1–2	England
Kotrč 29'	Report	Kirkham 26'; S. Mantell 33'

Umpires:
Roel van Eert (NED)
Mikael Mattsson (SWE)

9 February 2011
10:00

Austria	5–0	United States

9 February 2011
11:15

Russia	3–2	England

9 February 2011
12:30

Iran	3–4	Czech Republic

9 February 2011
16:15

England	3–2	United States

9 February 2011
17:30

Iran	7–4	Russia

9 February 2011
18:45

Czech Republic	1–1	Austria

10 February 2011
13:45

England	6–4	Iran

10 February 2011
15:00

United States	1–8	Czech Republic

10 February 2011
16:15

Russia	1–0	Austria

11 February 2011
13:45

Austria	3–2	England

11 February 2011
16:15

Czech Republic	3–3	Russia

11 February 2011
17:30

United States	2–6	Iran

=== Classification ===
==== Eleventh and twelfth place ====
12 February 2011
09:30

Namibia	0–8	United States
	Report	Schlling 4', 24', 30'; P. Harris 19', 29'; Hindy 27'; Cota 31', 35'

Umpires:
Roel van Eert (NED)
John Hrystak (CAN)

==== Ninth and tenth place ====
12 February 2011
12:30

Canada	6–7	Iran
Barber 6', 35'; Teixeira 12', 24'; Roberts 15'; Hignell 16'	Report	Aroei 13', 15', 33'; Bohlooli 25', 35'; Norouzzadeh 30', 32'

Umpires:
Gregory Uyttenhove (BEL)
Andrew Kennedy (ENG)

==== Seventh and eighth place ====
12 February 2011
10:00

Australia	7–4	Czech Republic
Swann 10'; Govers 16', 32'; Beaton 17'; Mackinnon 18', 38'; Bausor 27'	Report	Kotrč 6'; Vudmaska 24'; Kyndl 39'; Procházka 40'

Umpires:
Ged Curran (SCO)
Gus Soteriades (USA)

==== Fifth and sixth place ====
12 February 2011
14:30

Netherlands	4–2	England
Tigges 2', 6', 24'; M. Hertzberger 15'	Report	Mantell 34'; Alexander 39'

Umpires:
Michael Soukup (CZE)
Mikael Mattsson (SWE)

=== First to fourth place classification ===
Semi-finals
12 February
Germany	10
Russia	0
12 February
Austria	1
Poland	2

Final
13 February
Germany	3
Poland	2
Third place
13 February
Russia	0
Austria	5

==== Semi-finals ====
12 February 2011
17:30

Germany	10–0	Russia
Deecke 1', 15', 33'; Witthaus 2'; Woesch 3'; Stralkowski 16', 20', 39'; Weß 19'; Zeller 32'	Report

Umpires:
Juan Manuel Requena (ESP)
Pawel Linkowski (POL)

12 February 2011
20:30

Austria	1–2	Poland
Greutter 19'	Report	Raciniewski 9'; Rachwalski 14'

Umpires:
Andy Mair (SCO)
Gary Simmonds (RSA)

==== Third and fourth place ====
13 February 2011
12:00

Russia	0–5	Austria
	Report	Stanzl 9', 36'; Grandits 16'; Schmidt 32'; Stremitzer 40'

Umpires:
Andy Mair (SCO)
Pawel Linkowski (POL)

==== Final ====
13 February 2011
15:00

Germany	3–2 (a.e.t.)	Poland
Witthaus 15'; Deecke 33'; Weß 44'	Report	Rachwalski 4'; Górny 11'

Umpires:
Ged Curran (SCO)
Roel van Eert (NED)

== Statistics ==
=== Final standings ===
1. Germany
2. Poland
3. Austria
4. Russia
5. Netherlands
6. England
7. Australia
8. Czech Republic
9. Iran
10. Canada
11. United States
12. Namibia

=== Awards ===
- Most Valuable Player: Dariusz Rachwalski (POL)
- Top Scorer: Robert Tigges (NED)
- Best Goalkeeper: Mariusz Chyla (POL)
- Best U21 Player: Patrick Schmidt (AUT)

=== Goalscorers ===
There were 288 goals scored in 38 matches, for an average of 7.58 goals per match.

16 goals

- (Netherlands) Robert Tigges

15 goals

- (Germany) Thilo Stralkowski

14 goals

- (Germany) Oskar Deecke

11 goals

- (Iran) Abbas Aroei
- (Iran) Reza Norouzzadeh

10 goals

- (Germany) Matthias Witthaus

9 goals

- (Czech Republic) Štepan Bernátek

8 goals

- (Germany) Moritz Furste
- (Germany) Christopher Zeller
- (Poland) Dariusz Rachwalski

7 goals

- (Austria) Benjamin Stanzl

6 goals

- (Australia) Simon Beaton
- (Germany) Benjamin Weß
- (United States) Pat Harris

5 goals

- (Australia) Kieran Govers
- (Australia) Paul MacKinnon
- (Canada) Jonathan Roberts
- (England) Richard Mantell
- (Netherlands) Mirco Pruijser
- (Poland) Karol Szyplik

4 goals

- (Australia) Matthew Swann
- (Canada) Devohn Noronha-Teixeira
- (Czech Republic) Jakub Kyndl
- (England) Simon Mantell
- (Netherlands) Maurits Hertzberger
- (Poland) Tomasz Górny
- (Russia) Dmitrii Azarov
- (Russia) Alexander Platonov

3 goals

- (Austria) Michael Körper
- (Austria) Peter Proksch
- (Canada) Brandon Barber
- (Iran) Masoud Bohlooli
- (Poland) Tomasz Dutkiewicz
- (Poland) Tomasz Marcinkowski
- (Poland) Artur Mikula
- (Russia) Alexander Zhirkov
- (United States) Robert Schilling

2 goals

- (Australia) Christopher Bausor
- (Australia) Joshua Poulton
- (Austria) Philip Greutter
- (Canada) Jeewanjoth Bath
- (Czech Republic) Richard Kotrc
- (Czech Republic) Ondrej Vudmaska
- (England) Barry Middleton
- (England) James Tindall
- (Germany) Florian Woesch
- (Netherlands) Philip Engelkens
- (Netherlands) Willem Hertzberger
- (Netherlands) Teun Rohof
- (Poland) Krystian Makowski
- (Russia) Alexei Mamoshkin
- (United States) Patrick Cota
- (United States) Thomas Krauss

1 goal

- (Austria) Manuel Grandits
- (Austria) Dominik Monghy
- (Austria) Patrick Schmidt
- (Austria) Armin Stremitzer
- (Austria) Elmar Stremitzer
- (Canada) Adam Ali
- (Canada) Nicholas Hignell
- (Czech Republic) Ales Perinka
- (Czech Republic) Daniel Piterák
- (Czech Republic) Tomas Procházka
- (Czech Republic) David Vacek
- (England) Richard Alexander
- (England) Glenn Kirkham
- (England) Rob Moore
- (England) Richard Smith
- (Germany) Pilt Arnold
- (Germany) Tobias Hauke
- (Germany) Maximilian Müller
- (Iran) Yaghoub Bahrami
- (Iran) Ehsan Gordan
- (Iran) Roohollah Roufi
- (Namibia) Tyrone Kotze
- (Namibia) William Prosser
- (Netherlands) Robbert van de Peppel
- (Netherlands) Kristiaan Timman
- (Poland) Michal Raciniewski
- (Russia) Pavel Golubev
- (Russia) Alexander Korolev
- (Russia) Evgenii Mokrousov
- (Russia) Dmitry Volkov
- (United States) Sean Harris
- (United States) Shawn Hindy

Source: FIH
