= Jordi Carrera =

Spanish field hockey player (born 1982)

Jordi Carrera (born 12 June 1982) is a Spanish field hockey player. He competed for the Spain men's national field hockey team at the 2016 Summer Olympics.
