= 2021 Men's Indoor Pan American Cup =

Hockey championship

Tournament details
- Host country: United States
- City: Spring City
- Dates: June 25–27
- Teams: 3 (from 1 confederation)

Final positions
- Champions: Argentina (1st title)
- Runner-up: United States
- Third place: Canada

Tournament statistics
- Matches played: 7
- Goals scored: 43 (6.14 per match)
- Top scorer: (United States) Patrick Harris (6 goals)
- Best player: (Argentina) Juan Eleicegui

The 2021 Men's Indoor Pan American Cup was the eighth edition of the Men's Indoor Pan American Cup, the quadrennial international men's indoor hockey championship of the Americas organized by the Pan American Hockey Federation. It was held alongside the women's tournament in Spring City, Pennsylvania, United States from June 25 to 27, 2021.

The defending champions Trinidad and Tobago withdrew before the tournament. The winners, Argentina, qualified for the 2022 Men's FIH Indoor Hockey World Cup in Liège, Belgium.

== Results ==
=== Round-robin ===
| Pos | Team | Pld | W | D | L | GF | GA | GD | Pts | Qualification |
|---|---|---|---|---|---|---|---|---|---|---|
| 1 | Argentina | 4 | 3 | 0 | 1 | 15 | 9 | +6 | 9 | Final |
| 2 | United States (H) | 4 | 2 | 0 | 2 | 15 | 10 | +5 | 6 | Final |
| 3 | Canada | 4 | 1 | 0 | 3 | 7 | 18 | −11 | 3 | |
| 4 | Trinidad and Tobago | 0 | 0 | 0 | 0 | 0 | 0 | 0 | 0 | Withdrew |

Source: FIH
Rules for classification: 1) points; 2) matches won; 3) goal difference; 4) goals for; 5) head-to-head result; 6) field goals scored.
(H) Hosts

June 25, 2021
10:15

| Canada | 3–6 | Argentina |
|---|---|---|
| Fernandes 1'; G. Singh 25'; Dhaliwal 26' | Report | Navarro 4'; González 20', 32'; Sosa 22'; Eleicegui 22', 34' |

Umpires:
Ridge Bair (USA)
Donny Gobinsingh (TTO)

June 25, 2021
14:45

| Argentina | 4–3 | United States |
|---|---|---|
| Navarro 10', 22'; Ayala 20'; Eleicegui 30' | Report | Käppeler 11'; Heller 18'; Harris 19' |

Umpires:
Devin Hooper (GUY)
Alex Miles (CAN)

June 25, 2021
19:15

| United States | 6–1 | Canada |
|---|---|---|
| Harris 5', 16'; Käppeler 7'; DeAngelis 19'; Kentwell 28'; Heller 31' | Report | Teixeira 37' |

Umpires:
Diego Barbas (ARG)
Devin Hooper (GUY)

June 26, 2021
10:15

| United States | 1–4 | Argentina |
|---|---|---|
| Harris 32' | Report | Sosa 14'; Valdés 27'; Ayala 35'; Navarro 39' |

Umpires:
Donny Gobinsingh (TTO)
Alex Miles (CAN)

June 26, 2021
14:45

| Argentina | 1–2 | Canada |
|---|---|---|
| Ceballos 16' | Report | Fernandes 23'; Dhaliwal 39' |

Umpires:
Ridge Bair (USA)
Devin Hooper (GUY)

June 26, 2021
19:15

| Canada | 1–5 | United States |
|---|---|---|
| Dhaliwal 15' | Report | Käppeler 9'; Harris 18', 37'; Dhadwall 23'; Kentwell 30+' |

Umpires:
Devin Hooper (GUY)
Diego Barbas (ARG)

=== Final ===
June 27, 2021
13:30

| Argentina | 4–2 | United States |
|---|---|---|
| Ceballos 18', 39', 40'; González 27' | Report | Käppeler 22'; Kentwell 39' |

Umpires:
Devin Hooper (GUY)
Donny Gobinsingh (TTO)

== Statistics ==
=== Final standings ===
| Qualified for the 2022 World Cup |

| Rank | Team |
|---|---|
| 1st place, gold medalist(s) | Argentina |
| 2nd place, silver medalist(s) | United States |
| 3rd place, bronze medalist(s) | Canada |

=== Awards ===
The following awards were given at the conclusion of the tournament.

| Top goalscorer | Player of the tournament | Goalkeeper of the tournament |
|---|---|---|
| (United States) Pat Harris | (Argentina) Juan Eleicegui | (Argentina) Alan Frias |

=== Goalscorers ===
There were 43 goals scored in 7 matches, for an average of 6.14 goals per match.

6 goals

- (United States) Pat Harris

4 goals

- (Argentina) Agustin Ceballos
- (Argentina) Facundo Navarro
- (United States) Aki Käppeler

3 goals

- (Argentina) Juan Eleicegui
- (Argentina) Joaquín González
- (Canada) Gurtej Dhaliwal
- (United States) JaJa Kentwell

2 goals

- (Argentina) Nehuen Ayala
- (Argentina) Alfredo Sosa
- (Canada) Lyle Fernandes
- (United States) Vincent Heller

1 goal

- (Argentina) Maximiliano Valdés
- (Canada) Gurjot Singh
- (Canada) Micah Teixeira
- (United States) Christian DeAngelis
- (United States) Ajai Dhadwall

Source: FIH

== See also ==
- 2021 Women's Indoor Pan American Cup
