= Iain Evans (field hockey) =

South African field hockey player

Personal information
- Born: 29 May 1981 (age 45) Johannesburg, Gauteng
Medal record
Men's field hockey
Representing South Africa
Champions Challenge
Bronze medal – third place	2003 Johannesburg	Team

Iain Evans (born 29 May 1981) is a male field hockey player from South Africa, who was a member of the national squad that finished tenth at the 2004 Summer Olympics in Athens.

== International senior tournaments ==
- 2003 – Champions Challenge, Johannesburg (3rd)
- 2004 – Olympic Qualifier, Madrid (7th)
- 2004 – Summer Olympics, Athens (10th)
