= Tobias Hauke =

German field hockey player

Tobias Constantin Hauke (born 11 September 1987) is a German field hockey player who plays as a defender for Harvestehude.

In 2007, he completed his Abitur at the Gelehrtenschule des Johanneums in Hamburg. His sister, Franzisca Hauke plays also field hockey for the German national team.

== International career ==
He was a member of the national team that won gold medals at the 2008 Summer Olympics and 2012 Summer Olympics. On 28 May 2021, he was named as the captain in the squads for the 2021 EuroHockey Championship and the 2020 Summer Olympics. He announced his retirement from international play on 9 September 2021.

Preceded by Ashley Jackson	FIH Young Player of the Year; 2010	Succeeded by Matthew Swann
Preceded by Moritz Fürste	FIH Player of the Year; 2013	Succeeded by Mark Knowles
