= Wayne Fernandes =

Canadian field hockey player (born 1978)

Wayne Fernandes (born December 29, 1978, in Etobicoke, Ontario) is a Canadian field hockey player, who earned his first cap in 1996 against Pakistan.

Fernandes started playing hockey at the age of ten, and made his first international goal in 1999 against Germany in the Sultan Azlan Shah Tournament, in Kuala Lumpur. He is a member of a Canadian club called GOA Reds.

Fernandes got the winning goal at the 2007 Pan American Games in Rio de Janeiro, Brazil.

== International senior competitions ==
- 2001 — World Cup Qualifier, Edinburgh (8th)
- 2002 — Indoor Pan American Cup, Rockville (1st)
- 2002 — Commonwealth Games, Manchester (6th)
- 2003 — Indoor World Cup, Leipzig (6th)
- 2003 — Pan American Games, Santo Domingo (2nd)
- 2004 — Olympic Qualifying Tournament, Madrid (11th)
- 2004 — Pan Am Cup, London (2nd)
- 2006 — Commonwealth Games, Melbourne (9th)
- 2007 — Pan American Games, Rio de Janeiro (1st)
- 2008 — Olympic Games, Beijing (10th)
- 2009 — Pan American Cup, Santiago (1st)
- 2010 — 2010 Men's Hockey World Cup, New Delhi, India
