= Men's Indoor Pan American Cup =

International indoor hockey competition

- Most recent season or competition: 2024 Men's Indoor Pan American Cup
- Sport: Indoor hockey
- Founded: 2002; 24 years ago
- First season: 2002
- No. of teams: 5
- Confederation: PAHF (Americas)
- Most recent champion: Argentina (2nd title) (2024)
- Most titles: Canada (4 titles)

The Men's Indoor Pan American Cup is an international indoor hockey competition for men and women organised by the Pan American Hockey Federation (PAHF). The tournament started in the year 2002 for both men's and women's competition.

Apart from 2004 and 2008 edition, the winner (for 2002, 2005 and 2010, including runner-up) of each tournament was awarded an automatic berth to the Men's World Cup, as the continental champion.

== Results ==
Year	Host	Final			Third place match			Number of teams
Year	Host	Winner	Score	Runner-up	Third place	Score	Fourth place	Number of teams
2002; Details	Rockville, United States	Canada	Round-robin	United States	Trinidad and Tobago	Round-robin	Mexico	7
2004; Details	Valencia, Venezuela	Cuba	5–4 a.e.t.	United States	Venezuela	3–3 (3–1 p.s.o)	Peru	4
2005; Details	Kitchener, Canada	Canada	5–3	Trinidad and Tobago	United States	7–6 a.e.t.	Guyana	5
2008; Details	San Juan, Argentina	United States	6–1	Argentina	Peru	2–1	Uruguay	6
2010; Details	Barquisimeto, Venezuela	Canada	6–3	United States	Argentina	4–2	Trinidad and Tobago	9
2012	Puerto Montt, Chile	Cancelled			Cancelled			
2014; Details	Montevideo, Uruguay	Canada	4–2	United States	Guyana	2–2 (2–1 p.s.o)	Argentina	5
2017; Details	Georgetown, Guyana	Trinidad and Tobago	7–0	Argentina	Canada	5–2	Guyana	6
2021; Details	Spring City, United States	Argentina	4–2	United States	Canada	Only three teams		3
2024; Details	Calgary, Canada	Argentina	5–2	Trinidad and Tobago	United States	5–4	Guyana	5

=== Successful national teams ===
Team	Titles	Runners-up	Third places	Fourth places
Canada	4 (2002, 2005*, 2010, 2014)		2 (2017, 2021)	
Argentina	2 (2021, 2024)	2 (2008*, 2017)	1 (2010)	1 (2014)
United States	1 (2008)	5 (2002*, 2004, 2010, 2014, 2021*)	2 (2005, 2024)	
Trinidad and Tobago	1 (2017)	2 (2005, 2024)	1 (2002)	1 (2010)
Cuba	1 (2004)			
Guyana			1 (2014)	3 (2005, 2017*, 2024)
Peru			1 (2008)	1 (2004)
Venezuela			1 (2004*)	
Mexico				1 (2002)
Uruguay				1 (2008)

* = host nation

=== Team appearances ===
Team	(United States) 2002	(Venezuela) 2004	(Canada) 2005	(Argentina) 2008	(Venezuela) 2010	(Uruguay) 2014	(Guyana) 2017	(United States) 2021	(Canada) 2024	Total
Argentina	—	—	—	2nd	3rd	4th	2nd	1st	1st	6
Barbados	—	—	—	—	—	—	5th	—	—	1
Brazil	5th	—	—	—	—	—	—	—	—	1
Canada	1st	—	1st	—	1st	1st	3rd	3rd	5th	7
Cuba	—	1st	—	—	—	—	—	—	—	1
Guyana	—	—	4th	—	5th	3rd	4th	—	4th	5
Mexico	4th	—	—	6th	9th	—	6th	—	—	4
Paraguay	—	—	—	5th	—	—	—	—	—	1
Peru	—	4th	—	3rd	8th	—	—	—	—	3
Puerto Rico	7th	—	—	—	—	—	—	—	—	1
Trinidad and Tobago	3rd	—	2nd	—	4th	—	1st	–	2nd	5
United States	2nd	2nd	3rd	1st	2nd	2nd	—	2nd	3rd	8
Uruguay	—	—	—	4th	6th	5th	—	—	—	3
Venezuela	6th	3rd	5th	—	7th	—	—	—	—	4
Total	7	4	5	6	9	5	6	3	5	

== See also ==
- Men's Pan American Cup
- Women's Indoor Pan American Cup
