= 2014 Men's Indoor Pan American Cup =

Indoor hockey tournament

2014 Indoor Pan American Cup
Tournament details
- Host country: Uruguay
- City: Montevideo
- Dates: 7–12 April 2014

The 2014 Indoor Pan American Cup was the sixth edition of the Indoor Pan American Cup. It were held from 7 to 12 April 2014 in Montevideo, Uruguay. Five teams competed in the men's tournament while four teams competed in the women's tournaments. Canada, the winners of both tournament qualified for the 2015 Men's and Women's Hockey World Cup.

All times are local (UTC−03:00).

== Men's tournament ==
Men
- Teams: 5

Final positions
- Champions: Canada (4th title)
- Runner-up: United States
- Third place: Guyana

Tournament statistics
- Matches played: 12
- Goals scored: 66 (5.5 per match)
- Top scorer: (United States) Moritz Runzi (8 goals)

=== Pool matches ===
Pos	Team	Pld	W	D	L	GF	GA	GD	Pts	Qualification
1	Canada	4	3	0	1	15	3	+12	9	Advance to Final
2	United States	4	3	0	1	15	11	+4	9	Advance to Final
3	Argentina	4	2	0	2	11	10	+1	6	Third place match
4	Guyana	4	2	0	2	14	17	−3	6	Third place match
5	Uruguay (H)	4	0	0	4	1	15	−14	0	

Source: FIH
Rules for classification: 1) points; 2) goal difference; 3) goals scored; 4) head-to-head result.
(H) Hosts

7 April 2014
18:15

Argentina	3–5	Guyana
Denuncio 16'; Ceballos 29', 40'	Report	Munroe 2'; Samuels 4'; Branford 6'; Assanah 28'; France 37'

Umpires:
Donny Gobinsingh (TTO)
Gus Soteriades (USA)

7 April 2014
20:45

United States	4–0	Uruguay
Runzi 1', 38'; Schilling 28'; Scheurer 34'	Report

Umpires:
John Hrytsak (CAN)
Diego Barbas (ARG)

8 April 2014
18:15

United States	7–4	Guyana
Runzi 2', 18', 27', 35'; Dhadhwal 9'; Schilling 19'; Scheurer 38'	Report	Assanah 14', 40'; France 30'; Branford 31'

Umpires:
Diego Barbas (ARG)
Donny Gobinsingh (TTO)

8 April 2014
20:45

Canada	4–0	Uruguay
Roberts 13', 19'; Teixeira 26'; Sandison 32'	Report

Umpires:
Devin Hooper (GUY)
Daniel Gonzalez Alvizuri (PER)

9 April 2014
18:15

Canada	6–0	Guyana
Pereira 1', 33'; Roberts 11', 18'; Noronha Teixeira 25'; Branco 32'	Report

Umpires:
Gus Soteriades (USA)
Daniel Gonzalez Alvizuri (PER)

9 April 2014
20:45

Argentina	3–4	United States
Ceballos 12'; Espejo 16'; Gonzalez 27'	Report	Runzi 17'; Scheurer 22', 33'; Schilling 24'

Umpires:
Donny Gobinsingh (TTO)
Devin Hooper (GUY)

10 April 2014
18:15

United States	0–4	Canada
	Report	Sandison 4', 17'; Teixeira 7'; Noronha Teixeira 30'

Umpires:
Diego Barbas (ARG)
Devin Hooper (GUY)

10 April 2014
19:30

Uruguay	0–2	Argentina
	Report	Sosa 16'; Denuncio 19'

Umpires:
Donny Gobinsingh (TTO)
Gus Soteriades (USA)

11 April 2014
18:30

Argentina	3–1	Canada
Ceballos 30'; Gonzalez 38'; Leotta 40'	Report	Pereira 29'

Umpires:
Devin Hooper (GUY)
Gus Soteriades (USA)

11 April 2014
19:45

Guyana	5–1	Uruguay
Assanah 19', 31', 37'; Munroe 23'; France 29'	Report	Lopez 5'

Umpires:
Daniel Gonzalez Alvizuri (PER)
John Hrytsak (CAN)

=== Classification matches ===
==== Third and fourth place ====
12 April 2014
17:00

Argentina	2–2	Guyana
Ceballos 7', 26'	Report	Simon 28'; Assanah 40'
Penalties
Gonzalez (penalty shoot-out missed); Ceballos (penalty shoot-out scored); Espejo (penalty shoot-out missed); Ceballos (penalty shoot-out missed)	1–2	Simon (penalty shoot-out missed); Branford (penalty shoot-out missed); Assanah (penalty shoot-out scored); Assanah (penalty shoot-out scored)

Umpires:
John Hrytsak (CAN)
Gus Soteriades (USA)

==== Final ====
12 April 2014
18:30

Canada	4–2	United States
Bath 6'; Pereira 14'; Teixeira 32'; Roberts 39'	Report	Scheurer 21'; Runzi 36'

Umpires:
Diego Barbas (ARG)
Donny Gobinsingh (TTO)

=== Final standings ===
Qualified for the 2015 World Cup

Rank	Team
1st place, gold medalist(s)	Canada
2nd place, silver medalist(s)	United States
3rd place, bronze medalist(s)	Guyana
4	Argentina
5	Uruguay
