= Men's FIH Indoor Hockey World Cup =

Hockey World Cup

- Most recent season or competition: 2025 Men's FIH Indoor Hockey World Cup
- Sport: Indoor hockey
- Founded: 2003; 23 years ago
- First season: 2003
- No. of teams: 12
- Continent: International (FIH)
- Most recent champion: Germany (4th title) (2025)
- Most titles: Germany (4 titles)
- Qualification: Continental championships
- Website: FIH

The Men's FIH Indoor Hockey World Cup is an international indoor hockey competition organised by the International Hockey Federation (FIH). The tournament was first held in 2003 and it is held every four years.

== Format ==
Twelve qualified teams will be divided into two pools. The top two in their pool qualified for first to fourth classification, while third and fourth qualified for fifth to eighth classification, the last two teams will play for the last four placings.

== Qualification ==
Qualification is set by the governing body, the International Hockey Federation. The qualified teams include the host country, continental champions and the most recent World Cup final ranking.

== Summaries ==
#	Year	Host	Final			Third place match		
#	Year	Host	Winner	Score	Runner-up	Third place	Score	Fourth place
1	2003; Details	Leipzig, Germany	Germany	7–1	Poland	France	8–6	Switzerland
2	2007; Details	Vienna, Austria	Germany	4–1	Poland	Spain	3–1	Czech Republic
3	2011; Details	Poznań, Poland	Germany	3–2 (ET)	Poland	Austria	5–0	Russia
4	2015; Details	Leipzig, Germany	Netherlands	3–2	Austria	Germany	13–2	Iran
5	2018; Details	Berlin, Germany	Austria	3–3 (3–2 pso)	Germany	Iran	5–0	Australia
-	2022; Details	Liège, Belgium	Cancelled due to the COVID-19 pandemic.			Cancelled due to the COVID-19 pandemic.		
6	2023; Details	Pretoria, South Africa	Austria	4–4 (3–2 p.s.o.)	Netherlands	Iran	4–4 (3–2 p.s.o.)	United States
7	2025; Details	Poreč, Croatia	Germany	6–6 (2–1 p.s.o.)	Austria	South Africa	6–5	Belgium

== Performance by nation ==
Team	Titles	Runners-up	Third place	Fourth place
Germany	4 (2003, 2007, 2011, 2025)	1 (2018)	1 (2015)	
Austria	2 (2018, 2023)	2 (2015, 2025)	1 (2011)	
Netherlands	1 (2015)	1 (2023)		
Poland		3 (2003, 2007, 2011)		
Iran			2 (2018, 2023)	1 (2015)
France			1 (2003)	
Spain			1 (2007)	
South Africa			1 (2025)	
Switzerland				1 (2003)
Czech Republic				1 (2007)
Russia				1 (2011)
Australia				1 (2018)
United States				1 (2023)
Belgium				1 (2025)

== Team appearances ==
Team	(Germany) 2003	(Austria) 2007	(Poland) 2011	(Germany) 2015	(Germany) 2018	(South Africa) 2023	(Croatia) 2025	Total
Argentina	–	–	–	–	–	7th	10th	2
Australia	8th	8th	7th	10th	4th	11th	6th	7
Austria	–	6th	3rd	2nd	1st	1st	2nd	6
Belgium	–	–	–	–	7th	5th	4th	3
Canada	6th	7th	10th	12th	–	–	–	4
Croatia	–	–	–	–	–	–	9th	1
Czech Republic	7th	4th	8th	9th	5th	9th	–	6
England	–	–	6th	–	–	–	–	1
France	3rd	–	–	–	–	–	–	1
Germany	1st	1st	1st	3rd	2nd	WD	1st	6
Iran	–	–	9th	4th	3rd	3rd	7th	5
Italy	–	10th	–	–	–	–	–	1
Kazakhstan	–	–	–	–	12th	10th	–	2
Malaysia	–	–	–	–	–	–	11th	1
Namibia	–	–	12th	–	–	8th	8th	3
Netherlands	5th	–	5th	1st	–	2nd	–	4
New Zealand	12th	–	–	–	–	12th	–	2
Poland	2nd	2nd	2nd	7th	6th	–	5th	6
Russia	9th	5th	4th	5th	9th	DSQ	–	5
South Africa	10th	11th	–	11th	11th	6th	3rd	6
Spain	–	3rd	–	–	–	–	–	1
Sweden	–	–	–	6th	–	–	–	1
Switzerland	4th	9th	–	8th	8th	–	–	4
Trinidad and Tobago	–	12th	–	–	10th	–	12th	3
United States	11th	–	11th	–	–	4th	–	3
Total (25)	12	12	12	12	12	12	12	

== See also ==
- Indoor hockey at the World Games
- Field hockey at the Summer Olympics
- Men's FIH Hockey World Cup
- Men's FIH Hockey Junior World Cup
- Women's FIH Indoor Hockey World Cup
- Women's FIH Hockey World Cup
- Women's FIH Hockey Junior World Cup
- FIH Para Hockey World Cup
