= Indoor hockey =

Team sport

- Highest governing body: International Hockey Federation
- Nicknames: Hockey
- First played: 1950

Characteristics
- Contact: Yes
- Team members: 6 per side
- Type: Indoor
- Equipment: Indoor hockey ball, indoor hockey stick, mouthguard, gloves, shinpads

Presence
- Olympic: No
- World Games: Invitational in 2005

Indoor hockey is an indoor variant of field hockey. It is similar to the outdoor game in that two teams compete to move a hard ball into the goal of the opposing side using hockey sticks. Indoor hockey is played on a smaller area and between smaller teams than field hockey and the sidelines are replaced by solid barriers from which the ball rebounds and remains in play.

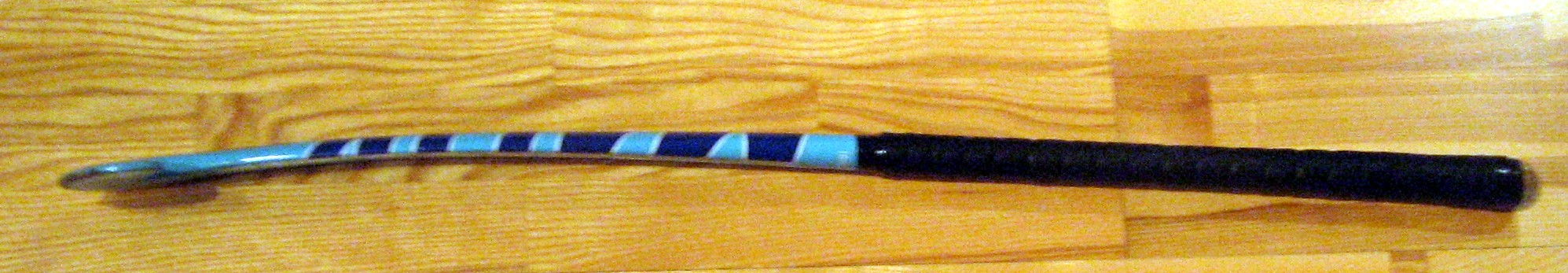
Indoor hockey stick

Indoor hockey pitch

It is traditionally and mainly played as a pastime by outdoor field hockey players during the off-season or when conditions are unsuitable for outdoor play. Indoor hockey is played in regular national and international championships. The first Indoor Hockey World Cup was organized in 2003. It included countries which do not compete at the highest level of the outdoor game.

== Rules ==
Indoor hockey differs from its outdoor parent in several ways:

- The pitch is smaller than the outdoor pitch. An indoor pitch is 18m to 22m wide by 36m to 44m long (similar to a handball or futsal pitch), divided by a center line. The shooting circle is defined by a distance of 9m from the nearest point of the goal. Side-boards mark the sidelines, helping to keep the ball on the pitch and allowing players to play against it. When the ball goes over the endline, the team will restart play which didn't play the ball last, the defensive team from the circle, the offensive team from the centerline. The pitch is made of wood or synthetic material. The board surface facing the playing surface is angled slightly to encourage ball to bounce down not up.
- The goals are smaller than in field hockey: 2m high by 3m wide and a minimum of 1m deep (this is the same size as handball goals as early indoor hockey used existing handball courts).
- A team consists of six players on the pitch, one of whom is a goalkeeper, with a maximum 12 players on a team.
- Internationally the game is divided into two 20-minute halves (in the German indoor league, they play 30-minute halves with the ability to call time-outs as in basketball). Halftime break is 15 minutes. In case of a regulation tie teams play up to two 5-minute golden-goal overtimes; otherwise, the game will be decided by penalty shootouts (3 rounds for each team followed by sudden-death rounds in case of ties thereafter).
- The players may not hit the ball, but only push it or deflect it, and may not raise the ball except in the shooting circle, with the purpose of scoring a goal.
- The balls and the sticks are similar, but players prefer lighter sticks than for the outdoor game.

== History ==
Indoor hockey developed in Germany during the 1950s, quickly spreading to other European nations. Belgium was one of the countries to adopt the field hockey variant, and in 1966 René Frank, a native of Belgium, who was later to become President of the FIH, persuaded the German Hockey Associations to give responsibility over the rules of Indoor Hockey to the FIH. This led to the FIH recognising indoor hockey in its constitution in 1968.

Whereas in many countries field hockey is played all year long, in Germany, The Netherlands and Austria the hockey season is divided evenly into a field hockey half in summer and an indoor hockey season in winter.

The first FIH sanctioned tournament matches of Indoor Hockey were played in 1972.

== World Cup ==
The International Hockey Federation organizes the Indoor Hockey World Cup. The first Indoor World Cup was held in Leipzig, Germany, in 2003, where the home nation won both the men's and women's gold medals. Eurosport television ratings for the recent Indoor Hockey World Cup, held in Leipzig, Germany, have shown the event to garner large audiences. A total of 20 million viewers watched 13 hours broadcast on Eurosport, with ten matches aired live. Peak viewing audience reached 889,000 viewers during the opening Poland vs. USA match, with the average live viewing figure for the whole tournament at 601,000. Germany and Poland, Eurosport's two strongest markets, showed particular interest, with more than 4 million different viewers tuning in from Germany, and more than 1.5 million watching from Poland. The average audience, calculated across several of Eurosport's key territories, showed a strong bias towards young males according to Eurosport's research. Arnaud Simon, Eurosport's Program Director commented: 'The first Indoor World Cup was a very exciting event, well suited for television and with good production standards. These characteristics were rewarded with very strong ratings, particularly considering that many of the matches were aired at off-peak viewing times.'

Els van Breda Vriesman, the president of the International Hockey Federation, added: 'The figures speak for themselves, proving not only that hockey has mass appeal on television, but also that the target audience presents a very attractive commercial proposition for potential sponsors and advertisers.'

Germany defended their titles in Vienna, Austria, in February 2007. The German men were successful, although the women were beaten in the semi-final by Spain, who went on to lose the final against the Netherlands.

== See also ==
- European Championship: the European championship, both men's and women's, was first held in 1974.
- Indoor Hockey World Cup – Men's and Women's
- Para hockey
