= Field hockey at the 2018 Asian Games – Men's team squads =

Twelve national teams competed in the men's field hockey tournament at the 2018 Asian Games in Indonesia. Eighteen players were officially enrolled in each squad.

== Pool A ==
=== India ===
The following is the India roster in the men's field hockey tournament of the 2018 Asian Games.

Head coach: (India) Harendra Singh

1. Harmanpreet Singh
2. Dilpreet Singh
3. Rupinder Pal Singh
6. Surender Kumar
7. Manpreet Singh
8. Sardara Singh
10. Simranjeet Singh
11. Mandeep Singh
14. Lalit Upadhyay
16. P. R. Sreejesh (C, GK)
19. Krishan Pathak (GK)
22. Varun Kumar
24. S. V. Sunil
26. Birendra Lakra
27. Akashdeep Singh
29. Chinglensana Singh
30. Amit Rohidas
32. Vivek Prasad

=== South Korea ===
The following is the South Korea roster in the men's field hockey tournament of the 2018 Asian Games.

Head coach: (South Korea) Kim Young-kyu

1. Hong Doo-pyo (GK)
3. Lee Se-yong (GK)
5. Rim Jin-kang
6. Yang Ji-hun
7. Jung Man-jae (C)
8. Hwang Weon-ki
9. Hwang Tae-il
10. Kim Jung-hoo
11. Lee Jung-jun
13. Seo In-woo
16. Bae Jong-suk
19. Jeong Jun-woo
22. Kim Seong-kyu
23. Kim Hyeong-jin
25. Kim Sung-yeob
27. Lee Dae-yeol
30. Jang Jong-hyun
32. Kim Ki-hoon

=== Japan ===
The following is the Japan roster in the men's field hockey tournament of the 2018 Asian Games.

Head coach: (Netherlands) Siegfried Aikman

1. Koji Yamasaki
4. Genki Mitani
5. Seren Tanaka
6. Hiromasa Ochiai
7. Kazuma Murata
8. Suguru Hoshi
9. Kenta Tanaka
11. Kenji Kitazato
13. Manabu Yamashita (C)
14. Kaito Tanaka
17. Kentaro Fukuda
20. Masaki Ohashi
25. Shota Yamada
28. Yusuke Takano (GK)
29. Hirotaka Zendana
30. Takashi Yoshikawa (GK)
31. Kota Watanabe
32. Yoshiki Kirishita

=== Sri Lanka ===
The following is the Sri Lanka roster in the men's field hockey tournament at the 2018 Asian Games. The team consists of 18 athletes.

1. Chamilka Mahabaduge (GK)
2. Dhammika Ranasingha
3. Ishanka Doranegala (C)
4. Pushpa Hendeniya
6. Harindra Dharmarathna
7. Tharanga Gunawardana
9. Sanjeewe Malegodagamage
10. Vipul Warnakula
11. Sandaruwan Sudusinghe
12. Nalantha Karunamunige
13. Rajitha Kulathunga
15. Gihan Rathnayake
17. Ravidu Bothale
20. Pramudya Fernando
22. Dinesh Don Abraham
23. Lahiru Panthie
29. Tharindu Hendeniya (GK)
30. Anuradha Rathnayake

=== Hong Kong ===
The following is the Hong Kong roster in the men's field hockey tournament of the 2018 Asian Games.

Head coach: (South Africa) Fabian Gregory

1. Chan Hou-Fong (GK)
2. Tse Man Chun
4. Felix Iu Chi Him
6. Yu Chi Wai
7. Yu Chun Hin
11. Chan Ka Chun
12. Chuen Kwun Wa
13. Angus Chan
15. Tso Tsz Fung
16. Michael Chung Yan Chun (GK)
17. Davis Kwok Chun Ting
19. Gabriel Tsoi
20. Siu Chung Ming (C)
21. Windfall Monthong
22. Ho Ching
23. Martin Tsang
27. Marco Yu
28. Jasper Au

=== Indonesia ===
The following is the Indonesia roster in the men's field hockey tournament of the 2018 Asian Games.

Head coach: (Malaysia) Lim Chow Chuan

1. Wahid Hakim
2. Sadli Septiansyah
4. Nanda Rahman
5. Daarul Quthni
6. Iexy Kristianto
7. Richard Aunalal
11. Ardam
14. Hendri Mulia
15. Alfandy Prastyo
17. Jerry Efendi
18. Budi Romansyah (C)
21. Bara Audah
22. Astri Rahmad
23. Aulia Al Ardh
24. Gamma Rahmatullah
25. Ahmad Hikmat (GK)
29. Dea Dwi Permana (GK)
32. Haris Siregar

== Pool B ==
=== Malaysia ===
The following is the Malaysia roster in the men's field hockey tournament of the 2018 Asian Games.

Head coach: (Malaysia) Stephen van Huizen

6. Marhan Jalil
7. Fitri Saari
9. Joel van Huizen
10. Faizal Saari
11. Syed Syafiq Syed Cholan
12. Sukri Mutalib (C)
13. Firhan Ashaari
14. Amirul Aideed
15. Nabil Fiqri
16. Kumar Subramaniam (GK)
17. Razie Rahim
18. Faiz Helmi Jali
19. Azri Hassan
20. Meor Azuan Hassan
23. Tengku Ahmad Tajuddin
24. Nik Aiman Nik Rozemi
26. Shahril Saabah
29. Hairi Rahman (GK)

=== Pakistan ===
The following is the Pakistan roster in the men's field hockey tournament of the 2018 Asian Games.

Head coach: (Netherlands) Roelant Oltmans

1. Imran Butt (GK)
3. Mubashar Ali
5. Toseeq Arshad
6. Rashid Mehmood
7. Muhammad Dilber
8. Muhammad Irfan
10. Ali Shan
11. Rizwan Ali (C)
12. Amjad Ali (GK)
13. Junaid Manzoor
14. Muhammad Umar Bhutta
16. Ammad Butt
17. Shafqat Rasool
18. Muhammad Atiq
20. Muhammad Faisal Qadir
23. Ajaz Ahmad
21. Tasawar Abbas
27. Abu Mahmood

=== Bangladesh ===
The following is the Bangladesh roster in the men's field hockey tournament of the 2018 Asian Games.

Head coach: (Malaysia) Gobinathan Krishnamurthy

1. Asim Gope (GK)
2. Mamunur Rahman Chayan
3. Farhad Shetul
4. Khorshadur Rahman
5. Imran Hasan
6. Roman Sarkar
7. Rashel Mahmud
8. Fazla Rabby
9. Milon Hossain
10. Mainul Islam
11. A.H.M. Kamruzzaman
12. Puskar Khisa
13. Sobuj Shohanur
14. Sarower Hossain
15. Naim Uddin
17. Ashraful Islam
19. Arshad Hossain
22. Abu Nippon (GK)

=== Oman ===
The following is the Oman roster in the men's field hockey tournament of the 2018 Asian Games.

Head coach: (Pakistan) Tahir Zaman

1. Muhanna Al-Hasani
3. Ammaar Al-Shaaibi
5. Younis Al-Nofli
7. Qosim Al-Shibli
8. Mahmood Al-Hasni (C)
9. Asaad Mubarak Al-Qasmi
10. Marwan Al-Raiisi
11. Basim Khatar Rajab
12. Khalid Al-Shaaibi
15. Faisal Ambork Alloun
16. Salah Al-Saadi
21. Imad Al-Hasani
22. Fahad Al-Noufali (GK)
23. Rashad Al-Fazari
25. Ali Salim Al-Zadjali
26. Ibrahim Al-Farsi (GK)
27. Sami Al-Laun
30. Mahmood Bait Shamaiaa

=== Thailand ===
The following is the Thailand roster in the men's field hockey tournament of the 2018 Asian Games.

Head coach: (South Korea) Kim Kyung-soo

1. Suriphong Jongjum (GK)
2. Theerachai Sansamran
4. Thanop Kampanthong
5. Chakan Boonmee
6. Sadakorn Vimuttanon (C)
8. Aphiwat Thanperm
9. Nisman Maseela
12. Ratthawit Khamkong
16. Norrawich Intani
17. Seksit Samoechai
20. Borirak Harapan
21. Wallop Khamwong
24. Wirawat Singthong
26. Thanakrit Boon-Art
27. Wiros Yosiri
28. Adisuan Suphawong
29. Tanakit Juntakian
30. Sataporn Phakhunthod

=== Kazakhstan ===
The following is the Kazakhstan roster in the men's field hockey tournament of the 2018 Asian Games.

Head coach: (Kazakhstan) Olga Urmanova

1. Daulet Urmanov
2. Elomon Ortikboyev
5. Ilgam Abdulabayev
7. Meirlan Toibekov
8. Maxat Zhokenbayev
10. Yermek Tashkeyev
11. Miras Zhakanov
13. Adilzhan Kudaibergen
14. Arsen Podolyakin
15. Aman Yelubayev
16. Yerzhan Yelubayev (GK)
17. Nurbol Kozhym
20. Yerkebulan Dyussebekov
21. Tilek Uzbek
23. Nurzhan Mukhamadiyev
32. Lenur Vishnyakov (GK)
