= Field hockey at the 2022 Asian Games – Men's Qualifier =

2022 Men's Asian Games Qualifier
Tournament details
- Host country: Thailand
- City: Bangkok
- Dates: 6–15 May
- Teams: 9 (from 1 confederation)
- Venue: Queen Sirikit Commemorative Stadium

Final positions
- Champions: Oman
- Runner-up: Bangladesh
- Third place: Indonesia

Tournament statistics
- Matches played: 24
- Goals scored: 103 (4.29 per match)
- Top scorer: (Sri Lanka) Vipul Warnakula (7 goals)

The 2022 Men's Asian Games Qualifier was the qualification tournament for the men's field hockey event at the 2022 Asian Games. It was held from 6 to 15 May 2022 in Bangkok, Thailand and the top six teams qualified for the 2022 Asian Games.

== Teams ==
- Bangladesh
- Hong Kong
- Indonesia
- Kazakhstan
- Oman
- Singapore
- Sri Lanka
- Thailand
- Uzbekistan

== Preliminary round ==
=== Pool A ===
| Pos | Team | Pld | W | D | L | GF | GA | GD | Pts | Qualification |
|---|---|---|---|---|---|---|---|---|---|---|
| 1 | Oman | 4 | 4 | 0 | 0 | 15 | 4 | +11 | 12 | Semi-finals |
| 2 | Thailand (H) | 4 | 1 | 2 | 1 | 5 | 3 | +2 | 5 | Semi-finals |
| 3 | Uzbekistan | 4 | 1 | 2 | 1 | 11 | 12 | −1 | 5 | |
| 4 | Hong Kong | 4 | 1 | 1 | 2 | 6 | 10 | −4 | 4 | |
| 5 | Kazakhstan | 4 | 0 | 1 | 3 | 3 | 11 | −8 | 1 | |

Source: FIH
Rules for classification: 1) points; 2) matches won; 3) goal difference; 4) goals for; 5) head-to-head result; 6) field goals for.
(H) Hosts

6 May 2022
14:00

| Hong Kong | 2–4 | Uzbekistan |
|---|---|---|
| Monthong 54'; Yu 55' | Report | Karimov 9', 51'; Mamajonov 16'; Mirzakarimov 35' |

Umpires:
Iman Sulaeman (INA)
Sunny Wang (SGP)

6 May 2022
16:00

| Thailand | 3–0 | Kazakhstan |
|---|---|---|
| Sansamran 43'; Boonpea 45'; Boon-Art 50' | Report |

Umpires:
Mohammad Ali Khan (BAN)
Mohomead Nawshad (SRI)

7 May 2022
14:00

| Oman | 3–0 | Kazakhstan |
|---|---|---|
| Al Fazari 2'; Al Lawati 26'; Bait 37' | Report |

Umpires:
Rawi Anbananthan (MAS)
Noppadon Prompim (THA)

8 May 2022
12:30

| Thailand | 1–1 | Uzbekistan |
|---|---|---|
| Boon-Art 37' | Report | Salimjonov 56' |

Umpires:
Raghu Prasad (IND)
Yaser Khurshid (PAK)

9 May 2022
12:00

| Hong Kong | 1–5 | Oman |
|---|---|---|
| Ho 41' | Report | Al Shaaibi 2', 17'; Al Laun 8'; Al Lawati 9'; Al Fazari 55' |

Umpires:
Yaser Khurshid (PAK)
Mohomead Nawshad (SRI)

9 May 2022
14:00

| Uzbekistan | 3–3 | Kazakhstan |
|---|---|---|
| Mamajonov 35'; Salimjonov 45+'; Khaytboev 54' | Report | Uzbek 15'; Duisengazy 24'; Yelubayev 30' |

Umpires:
Rawi Anbananthan (MAS)
Sunny Wang (SGP)

10 May 2022
14:00

| Kazakhstan | 0–2 | Hong Kong |
|---|---|---|
| | Report | Ali 37'; Monthong 38' |

Umpires:
Iman Sulaeman (INA)
Hashim Al Shatri (OMA)

10 May 2022
16:00

| Thailand | 0–1 | Oman |
|---|---|---|
| | Report | Al Balushi 55' |

Umpires:
Raghu Prasad (IND)
Mohammad Ali Khan (BAN)

12 May 2022
10:00

| Oman | 6–3 | Uzbekistan |
|---|---|---|
| Al Qasmi 5'; Al Lawati 11'; Al Fazari 17', 55'; Al-Maaini 34', 58' | Report | Salimjonov 44'; Nazarov 50'; Mirzakarimov 51' |

Umpires:
Yaser Khurshid (PAK)
Mohammad Ali Khan (BAN)

12 May 2022
16:00

| Hong Kong | 1–1 | Thailand |
|---|---|---|
| Chan 19' | Report | Sansamran 10' |

Umpires:
Mohomead Nawshad (SRI)
Sunny Wang (SGP)

=== Pool B ===
| Pos | Team | Pld | W | D | L | GF | GA | GD | Pts | Qualification |
|---|---|---|---|---|---|---|---|---|---|---|
| 1 | Bangladesh | 3 | 3 | 0 | 0 | 7 | 2 | +5 | 9 | Semi-finals |
| 2 | Indonesia | 3 | 1 | 1 | 1 | 4 | 4 | 0 | 4 | Semi-finals |
| 3 | Sri Lanka | 3 | 1 | 0 | 2 | 7 | 8 | −1 | 3 | |
| 4 | Singapore | 3 | 0 | 1 | 2 | 2 | 6 | −4 | 1 | |

Source: FIH
Rules for classification: 1) points; 2) matches won; 3) goal difference; 4) goals for; 5) head-to-head result; 6) field goals for.

7 May 2022
10:00

| Bangladesh | 3–1 | Indonesia |
|---|---|---|
| Hossain 10'; Khisa 24'; Rabby 41' | Report | Sandrea 40' |

Umpires:
Hashim Al Shatri (OMA)
Chor Ming Yeung (HKG)

7 May 2022
12:00

| Sri Lanka | 5–2 | Singapore |
|---|---|---|
| Chandrasena 24'; Dias 27'; Warnakula 28', 50', 59' | Report | Yuhari 13'; Yap 18' |

Umpires:
Surachaet Visavateeranon (THA)
Makhsudbek Urmanov (KAZ)

9 May 2022
16:00

| Indonesia | 0–0 | Singapore |
|---|---|---|
| | Report |

Umpires:
Chor Ming Yeung (HKG)
Raghu Prasad (IND)

10 May 2022
12:00

| Sri Lanka | 1–3 | Bangladesh |
|---|---|---|
| Warnakula 44' | Report | Islam 18'; Rahman 23'; Sarkar 53' |

Umpires:
Noppadon Prompim (THA)
Surachaet Visavateeranon (THA)

12 May 2022
12:00

| Indonesia | 3–1 | Sri Lanka |
|---|---|---|
| Ardam 20'; Prastyo 41'; Al Akbar 43' | Report | Sudusinghe 19' |

Umpires:
Rawi Anbananthan (MAS)
Makhsudbek Urmanov (KAZ)

12 May 2022
14:00

| Bangladesh | 1–0 | Singapore |
|---|---|---|
| Rakibul 19' | Report |

Umpires:
Chor Ming Yeung (HKG)
Noppadon Prompim (THA)

== Fifth to eighth place classification ==
=== Bracket ===
Semi-finals
14 May
Uzbekistan (p.s.o.) | 2 (4)
Singapore | 2 (2)
14 May
Sri Lanka | 5
Hong Kong | 2

Fifth place
15 May
Uzbekistan | 3 (1)
Sri Lanka (p.s.o.) | 3 (3)
Seventh place
15 May
Singapore | 4
Hong Kong | 0

=== 5–8th place semi-finals ===
14 May 2022
09:15

| Uzbekistan | 2–2 | Singapore |
|---|---|---|
| Khaytboev 23', 39' | Report | Yuhari 7', 13' |
Penalties
| Satlikov (penalty shoot-out scored); Khaytboev (penalty shoot-out scored); Karimov (penalty shoot-out scored); Nazarov (penalty shoot-out scored) | 4–2 | (penalty shoot-out missed) Noor; (penalty shoot-out scored) Marican; (penalty shoot-out scored) Johari; (penalty shoot-out missed) Prebhash |

Umpires:
Raghu Prasad (IND)
Chor Ming Yeung (HKG)

14 May 2022
11:30

| Sri Lanka | 5–2 | Hong Kong |
|---|---|---|
| Karunamunige 2'; Warnakula 46', 56'; Fernando 47'; Chandrasena 57' | Report | Monthong 17'; Chan 60' |

Umpires:
Rawi Anbananthan (MAS)
Mohammad Ali Khan (BAN)

=== Seventh place game ===
15 May 2022
09:15

| Singapore | 4–0 | Hong Kong |
|---|---|---|
| Yap 4'; Yuhari 13'; Marican 41', 50' | Report |

Umpires:
Iman Sulaeman (INA)
Makhsudbek Urmanov (KAZ)

=== Fifth place game ===
15 May 2022
11:30

| Uzbekistan | 3–3 | Sri Lanka |
|---|---|---|
| Karimov 37'; Vakhobjonov 44'; Mirzakarimov 51' | Report | Sudusinghe 11'; Ranasingha 37'; Warnakula 59' |
Penalties
| Satlikov (penalty shoot-out missed); Akhmadkhodjaev (penalty shoot-out scored); Khaytboev (penalty shoot-out missed); Karimov (penalty shoot-out missed) | 1–3 | (penalty shoot-out missed) Warnakula; (penalty shoot-out missed) Rathnayake; (penalty shoot-out scored) Kulathunga; (penalty shoot-out scored) Sudusinghe; (penalty shoot-out scored) Karunamunige |

Umpires:
Hashim Al Shatri (OMA)
Noppadon Prompim (THA)

== First to fourth place classification ==
=== Bracket ===
Semi-finals
14 May
Oman | 2
Indonesia | 0
14 May
Bangladesh | 4
Thailand | 1

Final
15 May
Oman | 6
Bangladesh | 2
Third place
15 May
Indonesia | 4
Thailand | 3

=== Semi-finals ===
14 May 2022
13:45

| Oman | 2–0 | Indonesia |
|---|---|---|
| Al Laun 37'; Al Qasmi 51' | Report |

Umpires:
Noppadon Prompim (THA)
Surachaet Visavateeranon (THA)

14 May 2022
16:00

| Bangladesh | 4–1 | Thailand |
|---|---|---|
| Sarkar 22'; Islam 29', 35'; Rakibul 47' | Report | Rungniyom 10' |

Umpires:
Mohomead Nawshad (SRI)
Yaser Khurshid (PAK)

=== Third place game ===
15 May 2022
13:45

| Indonesia | 4–3 | Thailand |
|---|---|---|
| Al Ardh 1'; Prastyo 32'; Ardam 37'; Asasi 42' | Report | Rungniyom 9'; Boonpea 18'; Chueamkaew 47' |

Umpires:
Yaser Khurshid (PAK)
Chor Ming Yeung (HKG)

=== Final ===
15 May 2022
16:00

| Oman | 6–2 | Bangladesh |
|---|---|---|
| Al Shaaibi 4'; Al Lawati 8'; Al-Saadi 10'; Al Qasmi 34'; Al Fazari 51'; Al-Shibli 59' | Report | Islam 48'; Rabby 60' |

Umpires:
Raghu Prasad (IND)
Rawi Anbananthan (MAS)

== Final standings ==
| Pos | Team | Qualification |
|---|---|---|
| 1 | Oman | 2022 Asian Games |
| 2 | Bangladesh | 2022 Asian Games |
| 3 | Indonesia | 2022 Asian Games |
| 4 | Thailand (H) | 2022 Asian Games |
| 5 | Sri Lanka | 2022 Asian Games |
| 6 | Uzbekistan | 2022 Asian Games |
| 7 | Singapore | |
| 8 | Hong Kong | |
| 9 | Kazakhstan | |

Source: FIH
(H) Host

== See also ==
- 2022 Men's AHF Cup
- Field hockey at the 2022 Asian Games – Women's Qualifier
