= Indonesia men's national field hockey team =

Field hockey team

Indonesia
- Nickname(s): Timnas (National Team); Merah Putih (Red and White)
- Association: Indonesian Hockey Association
- Confederation: AHF (Asia)
- Head Coach: Muhammad Dhaarma Raj Abdullah
- Manager: Hendri Mulia
- Captain: Aulia Al Ardh
Home	Away

FIH ranking
- Current: 79 ▼21 (29 September 2026)
- Highest: 44 (2024)
- Lowest: 77 (2023, June 2025)

First international
- Indonesia 1–3 Sri Lanka (Jakarta, Indonesia; 25 August 1962)

Biggest win
- Indonesia 8–1 Myanmar (Chonburi, Thailand; 15 December 2025)

Biggest defeat
- India 15–0 Indonesia (Jakarta, Indonesia; 20 August 2018)

Asian Games
- Appearances: 4 (first in 1962)
- Best result: 9th (1962, 2022)

Asia Cup
- Appearances: 2 (first in 2022)
- Best result: 7th (2022)
Medal record
SEA Games
Bronze medal – third place	2023 Cambodia	Team
Bronze medal – third place	2025 Thailand	Team

The Indonesia men's national field hockey team is made up of the best field hockey players in Indonesia. As of 21 September 2026, the team is ranked 58th in the world by the International Hockey Federation. The governing body for the sports is the Indonesia Hockey Federation.

== Competition history ==
A red box around the year indicates tournaments played within Indonesia and best results"

=== Asian Games ===
Asian Games record									Qualification record					
Host / Year	Rank	M	W	D	L	GF	GA	GD	M	W	D	L	GF	GA
(Japan) 1958	Did not enter								No information					
(Indonesia) 1962	9th place	4	0	0	4	2	18	-16	Qualified as host					
(Thailand) 1966	Did not qualify								No information					
(Thailand) 1970	Did not qualify								No information					
(Iran) 1974	Did not qualify								No information					
(Thailand) 1978	Did not qualify								No information					
(India) 1982	Did not qualify								No information					
(South Korea) 1986	Did not qualify								No information					
(China) 1990	Did not qualify								No information					
(Japan) 1994	Did not qualify								No information					
(Thailand) 1998	Did not qualify								No information					
(South Korea) 2002	Did not qualify								No information					
(Qatar) 2006	Did not qualify								Did not qualify					
(China) 2010	Did not qualify								Did not qualify					
(South Korea) 2014	Did not qualify								Did not qualify					
(Indonesia) 2018	10th place	6	0	1	5	6	42	-36	Qualified as host					
(China) 2022	9th place	6	2	0	4	11	29	-18	5	2	1	2	8	9
(Japan) 2026	12th place	6	0	1	5	9	40	-31	6	3	0	3	14	16
Total	4/18	22	2	2	18	28	129	-101	11	5	1	5	22	25

=== Asia Cup ===
Asia Cup record
Host / Year	Rank	M	W	D	L	GF	GA	GD
(Pakistan) 1982	Did not qualify							
(Bangladesh) 1985	Did not qualify							
(India) 1989	Did not qualify							
(Japan) 1993	Did not qualify							
(Malaysia) 1999	Did not qualify							
(Malaysia) 2003	Did not qualify							
(India) 2007	Did not qualify							
(Malaysia) 2009	Did not qualify							
(Malaysia) 2013	Did not qualify							
(Bangladesh) 2017	Did not qualify							
(Indonesia) 2022	8th place	5	0	0	5	2	44	-42
(India) 2025	Did not qualify							
Total	1/12	5	0	0	5	2	44	-42

=== AHF Cup ===
AHF Cup record
Host / Year	Position	Pld	W	D	L	GF	GA
1997 to 2016	did not participate						
(Indonesia) 2022	7th	6	3	0	3	19	20
(Indonesia) 2025	9th	5	1	0	4	10	12
Total	7th place	11	4	0	7	29	32

=== SEA Games ===
SEA Games record
Host / Year	Position	Pld	W	D	L
(Thailand) 2007	Did not enter				
(Myanmar) 2013	Did not enter				
(Singapore) 2015	Did not enter				
(Malaysia) 2017	5th place	4	0	1	3
(Cambodia) 2023	3rd place, bronze medalist(s)	4	2	1	1
(Thailand) 2025	3rd place, bronze medalist(s)	5	1	1	3
Total	3/6	13	3	3	7

== Results and fixtures ==
The following is a list of match results in the last 12 months, as well as any future matches that have been scheduled.

Win Draw Loss Fixture

=== 2026 ===
8 March Hong Kong Triangular Tournament	Hong Kong	4–0	Indonesia	Kowloon, Hong Kong
16:45	Kuldeep 10'; Sze 27'; Ali 42'; Cheung 49'	Report		Stadium: King's Park

==== 2026 Asian Games Qualifier ====
2 April Pool A	Hong Kong	3–4	Indonesia	Bangkok, Thailand
14:00 (UTC+7)	Cheung 5'; Au 7'; Ali 25'	Report	Al Ardh 11', 40'; Akmal 26'; Muhamad 28'	Stadium: Royal Thai Air Force Hockey Field

3 April Pool A	Oman	4–1	Indonesia	Bangkok, Thailand
14:00 (UTC+7)	Al-Maaini 28'; Al-Noufali 30'; Madit 57'; Barazahan 58'	Report	Al Ardh 13'	Stadium: Royal Thai Air Force Hockey Field

5 April Pool A	Kazakhstan	3–4	Indonesia	Bangkok, Thailand
18:00 (UTC+7)	Dyussebekov 44'; Duisengazy 50', 56'	Report	Asasi 6', 15'; Prastyo 31'; Akmal 47'	Stadium: Royal Thai Air Force Hockey Field

6 April Pool A	Indonesia	1–0	Thailand	Bangkok, Thailand
18:00 (UTC+7)	Al Ardh 12'	Report		Stadium: Royal Thai Air Force Hockey Field

9 April SF	Sri Lanka	3–2	Indonesia	Bangkok, Thailand
16:00	Fernando 6'; Rathnayake 48'; Kulathunga 52'	Report	Al Akbar 36'; Al Ardh 52'	Stadium: Royal Thai Air Force Hockey Stadium

10 April Bronze medal match	Uzbekistan	3–2	Indonesia	Bangkok, Thailand
13:45	Khaytboev 3'; Husanov 12'; Ortikboev 54'	Report	Al Ardh 24', 45'	Stadium: Royal Thai Air Force Hockey Stadium

==== 2026 Asian Games ====
20 September Pool A	India	13–1	Indonesia	Kakamigahara, Japan
15:00	Shilanand 6', 35'; Abhishek 12'; Dilpreet 18', 19', 37', 49'; Rajinder 19'; Mandeep 21'; Harmanpreet 28'; Sukhjeet 38', 48'; Jugraj 46'	Report	Al Ardh 33'	Stadium: Gifu Prefectural Green Stadium

22 September Pool A	Indonesia	0–5	South Korea	Kakamigahara, Japan
11:00		Report	Lim Do. 11', 23', 40', 42'; Kim. H 33'	Stadium: Gifu Prefectural Green Stadium

24 September Pool A	Indonesia	1–12	Japan	Kakamigahara, Japan
17:00	Wibowo 20'	Report	Kimura 2'; Takade 4'; Ooka 5'; Fujishima 9', 11', 34'; Kawabe 15'; Matsumoto 23'; K. Tanaka 41'; T. Tanaka 51', 58'; Yamasaki 53'	Stadium: Gifu Prefectural Green Stadium

26 September Pool A	Bangladesh	3–1	Indonesia	Kakamigahara, Japan
11:00	Am. Islam 11', 31'; Mahmud 37'	Report	Al Ardh 48'	Stadium: Gifu Prefectural Green Stadium

28 September Pool A	Sri Lanka	4–3	Indonesia	Kakamigahara, Japan
11:00	Ranasingha 11'; Batuvita 23'; Fernando 51'; Sudusinghe 58'	Report	Muhamad 20'; Prastyo 44', 50'	Stadium: Gifu Prefectural Green Stadium

1 October 11th place match	Indonesia	3–3 (2–3 p)	Oman	Kakamigahara, Japan
09:00	Alam 11'; Muhamad 45+'; Al Ardh 56'	Report	Barazahan 24'; M. Al-Noufali 29'; Madit 50'	Stadium: Gifu Prefectural Green Stadium
	Penalties
	Guntara (penalty shoot-out scored); Muhamad (penalty shoot-out missed); Asasi (penalty shoot-out missed); Fathur (penalty shoot-out scored); Firdaus (penalty shoot-out missed)		(penalty shoot-out scored) A. Al-Noufali; (penalty shoot-out missed) Al-Fazari; (penalty shoot-out scored) Al-Fazari; (penalty shoot-out missed) Al-Wahaibi; (penalty shoot-out scored) Barazahan

== Team ==
=== Current squad ===
The following is the Indonesia roster in the men's field hockey tournament of the 2026 Asian Games.

Head coach: (Malaysia) Dharma Raj Kanniah

3. Fadli Muhamad
4. Asrul Alam
5. Ferdian Rahman
7. Khaerulloh Akmal
10. Ahdan Asasi
12. Alam Fajar (GK)
13. Revo Priliandro
14. Julius Rumaropen (GK)
15. Alfandy Prastyo
16. Suharyana
17. Jerry Efendi
18. Muhammad Firdaus
19. Mochamad Fathur
20. Arthur Wibowo
21. Nurul Maulana
23. Aulia Al Ardh (C)
25. Adi Leksono
27. Andrea Guntara

=== Coach history ===
Period	Coach
2017	Matheus Kbarek
2018	Lim Chiow Chuan
2021–2022, 2026	Muhammad Dhaarma Raj Abdullah
2023–2025	Krishnamurthy Gobinathan
2025	Jason Butcher

== See also ==
- Indonesia women's national field hockey team
