= 2025 Men's Hockey Asia Cup =

Field hockey competition

Tournament details
- Host country: India
- City: Rajgir
- Dates: 29 August – 7 September
- Teams: 8 (from 1 confederation)
- Venue: Bihar Sports University Hockey Stadium

Final positions
- Champions: India (4th title)
- Runner-up: South Korea
- Third place: Malaysia

Tournament statistics
- Matches played: 24
- Goals scored: 164 (6.83 per match)
- Top scorer: (Malaysia) Akhimullah Anuar (12 goals)
- Best player: (India) Abhishek Nain
- Best young player: (Malaysia) Andywalfian Jeffrynus
- Best goalkeeper: (South Korea) Kim Jae-hyeon

The 2025 Men's Hockey Asia Cup was the 12th edition of the Men's Hockey Asia Cup, the quadrennial international men's field hockey championship of Asia organized by the Asian Hockey Federation. It was held at the Bihar Sports University Hockey Stadium in Rajgir Sports Complex, India from 29 August to 7 September 2025. The tournament returned to its usual four-year cycle after the previous tournament was delayed to 2022 due to the COVID-19.

South Korea, the defending champions, finished as runners-up after losing to India in the final. The winning team, India qualified for the 2026 Men's FIH Hockey World Cup.

Pakistan withdrew citing security concerns amid the 2025 India–Pakistan crisis and requested a neutral venue, later also withdrawing from the 2025 Junior World Cup in Tamil Nadu, India. They were replaced by Bangladesh. Oman also pulled out due to financial issues and was replaced by Kazakhstan.

== Qualification ==
=== Qualified teams ===
Highlighted are the countries that are participating in the 2025 Men's Asia Cup. Qualified via FIH rankings or AHF Cup Qualified via FIH ranking and as hosts

Dates	Event	Location	Quotas	Qualifiers
—N/a	FIH Men's World Ranking	—N/a	5	China; India (host); Japan; Malaysia; ~~Pakistan~~ (Note: Pakistan and Oman withdrew and were replaced by Bangladesh and Kazakhstan.); South Korea
17–27 April 2025	2025 AHF Cup	Jakarta, Indonesia	3	Bangladesh; Chinese Taipei; Kazakhstan; ~~Oman~~
Total			8	

== Preliminary round ==
All times are local (UTC+5:30).

=== Pool A ===
Pos	Team	Pld	W	D	L	GF	GA	GD	Pts	Qualification
1	India (H)	3	3	0	0	22	5	+17	9	Super4s
2	China	3	1	1	1	18	7	+11	4	Super4s
3	Japan	3	1	1	1	11	5	+6	4	
4	Kazakhstan	3	0	0	3	1	35	−34	0	

Source: FIH
Rules for classification: 1) points; 2) matches won; 3) goal difference; 4) goals for; 5) head-to-head result; 6) field goals for.
(H) Hosts

29 August 2025
13:00

Japan	7–0	Kazakhstan
Kawabe 1'; Kimura 5'; Yamasaki 13', 36'; Nagayoshi 48'; Yamada 50'; Shinohara 54'	Report

Umpires:
Khamis Al-Balushi (OMA)
Salim Lucky (BAN)

29 August 2025
15:00

India	4–3	China
Jugraj 18'; Harmanpreet 20', 33', 47'	Report	Du 12'; Chen B. 35'; Gao 41'

Umpires:
Rawi Anbananthan (MAS)
You Hyo-sik (KOR)

31 August 2025
13:00

China	13–1	Kazakhstan
Du 10', 53'; Chen Q. 13'; Lin 15', 39'; Chen B. 29', 56'; Lu 31', 42', 44'; Gao 33'; Guo 41', 58'	Report	Duisengazy 2'

Umpires:
Salim Lucky (BAN)
Balaji Kumar (IND)

31 August 2025
15:00

Japan	2–3	India
Kawabe 38', 59'	Report	Mandeep 4'; Harmanpreet 5', 46'

Umpires:
Michiel Otten (NED)
Rawi Anbananthan (MAS)

1 September 2025
17:30

China	2–2	Japan
Lin 7'; Zhang 25'	Report	Matsumoto 28', 51'

Umpires:
Aziz Adimah (GHA)
Tyler Klenk (CAN)

1 September 2025
19:30

India	15–0	Kazakhstan
Abhishek 5', 8', 20', 59'; Sukhjeet 15', 32', 38'; Jugraj 24', 31', 47'; Harmanpreet 26'; Amit 29'; Rajinder 32'; Sanjay 54'; Dilpreet 55'	Report

Umpires:
Zhou Fuyi (CHN)
Khamis Al-Balushi (OMA)

=== Pool B ===
Pos	Team	Pld	W	D	L	GF	GA	GD	Pts	Qualification
1	Malaysia	3	3	0	0	23	2	+21	9	Super4s
2	South Korea	3	2	0	1	13	5	+8	6	Super4s
3	Bangladesh	3	1	0	2	10	12	−2	3	
4	Chinese Taipei	3	0	0	3	3	30	−27	0	

Source: FIH
Rules for classification: 1) points; 2) matches won; 3) goal difference; 4) goals for; 5) head-to-head result; 6) field goals for.

29 August 2025
09:00

Malaysia	4–1	Bangladesh
Hamsani 25'; Akhimullah 36'; Abdu Rauf 48'; Cholan 54'	Report	Islam 16'

Umpires:
Tyler Klenk (CAN)
Gurbaj Singh (IND)

29 August 2025
11:00

South Korea	7–0	Chinese Taipei
Son 17', 29', 58'; Yang 27', 50'; Oh 53'; Kong 54'	Report

Umpires:
Balaji Kumar (IND)
Aziz Adimah (GHA)

30 August 2025
13:00

Bangladesh	8–3	Chinese Taipei
Abdullah 4', 26'; Sobuj 36'; Hasan 42', 42'; Islam 45', 58'; Babu 56'	Report	Hsieh 10', 18'; Shih 60'

Umpires:
Hideki Kinoshita (JPN)
Zhou Fuyi (CHN)

30 August 2025
15:00

South Korea	1–4	Malaysia
Jin 2'	Report	Akhimullah 29', 34', 38'; Hamsani 33'

Umpires:
Anand Dangi (IND)
Michiel Otten (NED)

1 September 2025
13:30

Bangladesh	1–5	South Korea
Sobuj 22'	Report	Son 9', 11'; Lee Seung-w. 16'; Oh 22'; Yang 60+'

Umpires:
Hideki Kinoshita (JPN)
Anand Dangi (IND)

1 September 2025
15:30

Malaysia	15–0	Chinese Taipei
Hamsani 8', 15', 32', 54'; Akhimullah 10', 20', 29', 45', 56'; Sumantri 20', 40', 60'; Azrai 22'; Jeffrynus 24'; Rozemi 32'	Report

Umpires:
You Hyo-sik (KOR)
Gurbaj Singh (IND)

== Fifth to eighth place ==
=== Bracket ===
5–8th place semi-finals
3 September
Japan	2
Chinese Taipei	0
4 September
Bangladesh	5
Kazakhstan	1

Fifth place
7 September
Japan	6
Bangladesh	1
Seventh place
6 September
Chinese Taipei	4
Kazakhstan	6

=== 5–8th place semi-finals ===
3 September 2025
14:30

Japan	2–0	Chinese Taipei
Shinohara 5', 11'	Report

Umpires:
Balaji Kumar (IND)
Gurbaj Singh (IND)

4 September 2025
14:30

Bangladesh	5–1	Kazakhstan
Islam 10', 23'; Sarkar 28', 33'; Ali 34'	Report	Aitkaliyev 38'

Umpires:
Zhou Fuyi (CHN)
Anand Dangi (IND)

=== Seventh and eighth place ===
6 September 2025
14:30

Chinese Taipei	4–6	Kazakhstan
Chang Yu-c. 7'; Hsieh 13', 18', 31'	Report	Duisengazy 12', 23', 30', 36', 56'; Aitkaliyev 47'

Umpires:
Balaji Kumar (IND)
Zhou Fuyi (CHN)

=== Fifth and sixth place ===
7 September 2025
14:30

Japan	6–1	Bangladesh
Yamasaki 9'; Shinohara 15', 36', 56'; Nagayoshi 36'; Tanaka 50'	Report	Islam 55'

Umpires:
You Hyo-sik (KOR)
Khamis Al-Balushi (OMA)

== First to fourth place ==
=== Super4s ===
Pos	Team	Pld	W	D	L	GF	GA	GD	Pts	Qualification
1	India (H)	3	2	1	0	13	3	+10	7	Final
2	South Korea	3	1	1	1	6	8	−2	4	Final
3	Malaysia	3	1	0	2	6	8	−2	3	Third place match
4	China	3	1	0	2	3	9	−6	3	Third place match

Source: FIH
Rules for classification: 1) points; 2) matches won; 3) goal difference; 4) goals for; 5) head-to-head result; 6) field goals scored.
(H) Hosts

3 September 2025
17:00

Malaysia	2–0	China
Cholan 45'; Akhimullah 47'	Report

Umpires:
Aziz Adimah (GHA)
Hideki Kinoshita (JPN)

3 September 2025
19:30

India	2–2	South Korea
Hardik 8'; Mandeep 53'	Report	Yang 12'; Kim Hyeon-h. 14'

Umpires:
Tyler Klenk (CAN)
Khamis Al-Balushi (OMA)

4 September 2025
17:00

South Korea	0–3	China
	Report	Chen B. 13', 43'; Gao 43'

Umpires:
Salim Lucky (BAN)
Rawi Anbananthan (MAS)

4 September 2025
19:30

Malaysia	1–4	India
Hassan 2'	Report	Manpreet 17'; Sukhjeet 19'; Lakra 24'; Prasad 38'

Umpires:
Michiel Otten (NED)
You Hyo-sik (KOR)

6 September 2025
17:00

South Korea	4–3	Malaysia
Kim Hyeon-h. 24', 51'; Oh 44'; Lee J. 50'	Report	Fitri 9'; Rozemi 29'; Cholan 31'

Umpires:
Anand Dangi (IND)
Aziz Adimah (GHA)

6 September 2025
19:30

India	7–0	China
Lakra 4'; Dilpreet 7'; Mandeep 18'; Pal 37'; Sukhjeet 39'; Abhishek 46', 50'	Report

Umpires:
Hideki Kinoshita (JPN)
Tyler Klenk (CAN)

=== Third and fourth place ===
7 September 2025
17:00

Malaysia	4–1	China
Sumantri 8'; Akhimullah 36', 50'; Cholan 58'	Report	Gao 54'

Umpires:
Tyler Klenk (CAN)
Hideki Kinoshita (JPN)

=== Final ===
7 September 2025
19:30

India	4–1	South Korea
Sukhjeet 1'; Dilpreet 28', 45'; Amit 50'	Report	Son 51'

Umpires:
Rawi Anbananthan (MAS)
Michiel Otten (NED)

== Statistics ==
=== Final standings ===
Pos	Team	Qualification
1st place, gold medalist(s)	India (H)	2026 World Cup
2nd place, silver medalist(s)	South Korea	2026 World Cup Qualifiers
3rd place, bronze medalist(s)	Malaysia	2026 World Cup Qualifiers
4	China	2026 World Cup Qualifiers
5	Japan	2026 World Cup Qualifiers
6	Bangladesh	2025 Asia Play–Offs
7	Kazakhstan	
8	Chinese Taipei	

Source: FIH
(H) Host

=== Goalscorers ===
There were 164 goals scored in 24 matches, for an average of 6.83 goals per match.

12 goals

- (Malaysia) Akhimullah Anuar

6 goals

- (India) Abhishek Nain
- (India) Harmanpreet Singh
- (India) Sukhjeet Singh
- (Japan) Ryosuke Shinohara
- (Kazakhstan) Agymtay Duisengazy
- (Malaysia) Ashran Hamsani
- (South Korea) Son Da-in

5 goals

- (Bangladesh) Ashraful Islam
- (China) Chen Benhai
- (Chinese Taipei) Hsieh Tsung-yu

4 goals

- (China) Gao Jiesheng
- (India) Dilpreet Singh
- (India) Jugraj Singh
- (Malaysia) Syed Cholan
- (Malaysia) Norsyafiq Sumantri
- (South Korea) Yang Ji-hun

3 goals

- (China) Du Shihao
- (China) Lin Changliang
- (China) Lu Yuanlin
- (India) Mandeep Singh
- (Japan) Kosei Kawabe
- (Japan) Koji Yamasaki
- (South Korea) Kim Hyeon-hong
- (South Korea) Oh Se-yong

2 goals

- (Bangladesh) Md Abdullah
- (Bangladesh) Rakibul Hasan
- (Bangladesh) Roman Sarkar
- (Bangladesh) Shohanur Sobuj
- (China) Guo Xiaolong
- (India) Shilanand Lakra
- (India) Amit Rohidas
- (Japan) Kazumasa Matsumoto
- (Japan) Ken Nagayoshi
- (Kazakhstan) Altynbek Aitkaliyev
- (Malaysia) Aiman Rozemi

1 goal

- (Bangladesh) Tayab Ali
- (Bangladesh) Rezaul Babu
- (Bangladesh) Amirul Islam
- (China) Chen Qijun
- (China) Zhang Xiaojia
- (Chinese Taipei) Chang Yu-cheng
- (Chinese Taipei) Shih Tsung-jen
- (India) Raj Kumar Pal
- (India) Vivek Prasad
- (India) Sanjay Rana
- (India) Hardik Singh
- (India) Manpreet Singh
- (India) Rajinder Singh
- (Japan) Naru Kimura
- (Japan) Seren Tanaka
- (Japan) Shota Yamada
- (Malaysia) Muhajir Abdu Rauf
- (Malaysia) Abu Kamal Azrai
- (Malaysia) Shafiq Hassan
- (Malaysia) Andywalfian Jeffrynus
- (Malaysia) Fitri Saari
- (South Korea) Jin Geon-hyo
- (South Korea) Kong Yoon-ho
- (South Korea) Lee Jung-jun
- (South Korea) Lee Seung-woo

Source: FIH

=== Awards ===
The following awards were given at the conclusion of the tournament.

Award	Player
Player of the tournament	(India) Abhishek Nain
Goalkeeper of the tournament	(South Korea) Kim Jae-hyeon
Young player of the tournament	(Malaysia) Andywalfian Jeffrynus
Promising goalkeeper of the tournament	(China) Wang Caiyu

== See also ==
- 2025 Men's Hockey U18 Asia Cup
- 2026 Men's FIH Hockey World Cup
