= Farhad Shetul =

Bangladeshi field hockey player

Personal information
- Born: 9 December 1995 (age 30)

Sport
- Sport: Field hockey
- Position: Defender
- Club: ACME Chattogram
Senior career
Years	Team	Caps	Goals
2022–	ACME Chattogram	-	-
National team
Years	Team	Caps	Goals
2014–	Bangladesh	61	-
Medal record
Men's field hockey
Representing Bangladesh
Men's AHF Cup
Gold medal – first place	2016 Hong Kong	Team
Gold medal – first place	2022 Indonesia	Team
Bronze medal – third place	2025 Indonesia	Team
South Asian Games
Bronze medal – third place	2016 Guwahati	Team

Farhad Shetul (Bengali: ফরহাদ সেতুল) is a Bangladeshi field hockey player and he is an international player in Bangladesh. He is a player of Bangladesh national field hockey team.

== Honours ==
=== Bangladesh ===
- Men's AHF Cup: 2016, 2022
- South Asian Games bronze medal: 2016

=== ACME Chattogram ===
- Hockey Champions Trophy Bangladesh: 2022
