= Hong Kong men's national field hockey team =

Hong Kong national sports team

Hong Kong
- Association: Hong Kong Hockey Association
- Confederation: ASHF (Asia)
- Head Coach: (Hong Kong) Arif Ali
- Assistant coach(es): Chun Hin Yu
- Manager: Malkit Pannu
- Captain: Ching Ho Lam
| Home | Away |

FIH ranking
- Current: 41 ▲7 (9 March 2026)
- Highest: 30 (2004)
- Lowest: 65 (2022)

Olympic Games
- Appearances: 1 (first in 1964)
- Best result: 15th (1964)

Asian Games
- Appearances: 12 (first in 1962)
- Best result: 5th (1978)

Asia Cup
- Appearances: 3 (first in 1999)
- Best result: 7th (2003)

The Hong Kong men's national field hockey team represents Hong Kong in men's international field hockey competitions.

== Tournament record ==
=== Summer Olympics ===
- 1964 – 15th place

=== Asian Games ===
- 1962 – 6th place
- 1966 – 7th place
- 1970 – 7th place
- 1978 – 5th place
- 1982 – 8th place
- 1986 – 6th place
- 1990 – 7th place
- 1998 – 8th place
- 2002 – 8th place
- 2006 – 9th place
- 2010 – 9th place
- 2018 – 12th place

=== Asia Cup ===
Men's Hockey Asia Cup
| Year | Rank | Matches | Goals |
|---|---|---|---|
| 1999 | 8th | 0-0-3 | 2-17 |
| 2003 | 7th | 1-0-4 | 9-21 |
| 2007 | 8th | 1-0-5 | 8-37 |
| Total | 3/12 | 2-0-12 | 19-75 |

=== AHF Cup ===
AHF Cup record
| Year | Host | Position |
|---|---|---|
| 1997 | Hong Kong | 1st |
| 2002 | Hong Kong | 1st |
| 2008 | Singapore | 7th |
| 2012 | Bangkok, Thailand | 8th |
| 2016 | Hong Kong | 3rd |
| 2022 | Jakarta, Indonesia | did not participate |
| 2025 | Jakarta, Indonesia | 5th |
| Highest finish | | 1st place |

=== Hockey World League ===
- 2012–13 – Round 1
- 2014–15 – Round 1
- 2016–17 – Round 1

=== Hockey Series ===
- 2018–19 – First Round

=== AHF Central Asia Cup ===
- 2025 – (bronze)

== Current squad ==
The following 18 players were named on 31 March 2026 for the 2026 Asian Games Qualifier from 2 to 10 April 2026 in Bangkok, Thailand.

Head Coach: (Hong Kong) Arif Ali

1. Felix Chi Him Iu
2. Haider-Qismat
3. Jasmol Dhillon
4. James Shepherdson
6. Wing Shun Kwong
7. Kuldeep-Singh
8. Istiaq Ahmed
10. Farman Ali
11. Chun Ka Chan
12. Kwun Wa Chuen
14. Kin Kan Tsang
16. Yan Chun Michael Chung (GK)
17. Chun Ting Davis Kwok
18. Udhampreet-Singh
19. Ching Ho Lam (C, GK)
20. Yan Kwan Cheung
21. Pak Ko Parco Au
28. Jasminder Singh

== Results and fixtures ==
The following is a list of match results in the last 12 months, as well as any future matches that have been scheduled.

Win Draw Loss Fixture

=== 2026 ===
| 8 March 2026 Hong Kong Triangular Tournament | Hong Kong | 4–0 | Indonesia | Kowloon, Hong Kong |
| 16:45 | Kuldeep 10'; Sze 27'; Ali 42'; Cheung 49' | Report | | Stadium: King's Park |

==== 2026 Asian Games Qualifier ====
| 2 April 2026 Pool A | Hong Kong | 3–4 | Indonesia | Bangkok, Thailand |
| 14:00 | Cheung 5'; Au 7'; Ali 25' | Report | Al Ardh 11', 40'; Akmal 26'; Muhamad 28' | Stadium: Royal Thai Air Force Hockey Stadium |

| 3 April 2026 Pool A | Hong Kong | 4–3 | Kazakhstan | Bangkok, Thailand |
| 16:00 | Iu 9'; Ahmed 11', 58'; Haider-Qismat 27' | Report | Dyussebekov 19'; Duisengazy 37'; Tashkeyev 40' | Stadium: Royal Thai Air Force Hockey Stadium |

| 6 April 2026 Pool A | Hong Kong | 1–2 | Oman | Bangkok, Thailand |
| 14:00 | Iu 45' | Report | Barazahan 11'; Al-Maaini 41' | Stadium: Royal Thai Air Force Hockey Stadium |

| 7 April 2026 Pool A | Thailand | 4–1 | Hong Kong | Bangkok, Thailand |
| 16:00 | Chaimanee 3', 60'; Chueamkaew 32'; Rungniyom 45' | Report | Haider-Qismat 32' | Stadium: Royal Thai Air Force Hockey Stadium |

| 9 April 2026 5/8th Classification | Bangladesh | 4–4 (3–2 p) | Hong Kong | Bangkok, Thailand |
| 11:30 | Hasan 3'; Am. Islam 5'; As. Islam 41', 47' | Report | Au 5'; Ahmed 31'; Kuldeep 46'; Iu 48' | Stadium: Royal Thai Air Force Hockey Stadium |
| | Penalties |
| | Hasan (penalty shoot-out missed); Joy (penalty shoot-out scored); Roman (penalty shoot-out scored); Uddin (penalty shoot-out missed); F. Rabby (penalty shoot-out scored) | | (penalty shoot-out scored) Kuldeep; (penalty shoot-out missed) Ahmed; (penalty shoot-out missed) Ali; (penalty shoot-out missed) Udhampreet; (penalty shoot-out scored) Iu |

| 10 April 2026 Seventh place game | Thailand | 2–2 (2–1 p) | Hong Kong | Bangkok, Thailand |
| 09:15 | Khammi 1', 4' | Report | Haider-Qismat 6', 33' | Stadium: Royal Thai Air Force Hockey Stadium |
| | Penalties |
| | Juntakian (penalty shoot-out missed); Chaimanee (penalty shoot-out scored); Khammi (penalty shoot-out missed); Deesa (penalty shoot-out scored) | | (penalty shoot-out scored) Chuen; (penalty shoot-out missed) Kuldeep; (penalty shoot-out missed) Udhampreet; (penalty shoot-out missed) Jasminder; (penalty shoot-out missed) Iu |

== See also ==
- Hong Kong women's national field hockey team
