= Chinese Taipei men's national field hockey team =

Hockey team

Chinese Taipei
- Association: Chinese Taipei Hockey Association
- Confederation: AHF (Asia)
- Head Coach: Wang Yun-Chang
- Assistant coach(es): Tsai Ming-Heng
- Captain: Chang Chun-Yu

FIH ranking
- Current: 47 ▲9 (9 March 2026)

Asian Games
- Appearances: 1 (first in 2006)
- Best result: 8th (2006)

Asia Cup
- Appearances: 2 (first in 2013)
- Best result: 8th (2013, 2025)

The Chinese Taipei men's national field hockey team represents Taiwan in men's international field hockey competitions and is controlled by the Chinese Taipei Hockey Association, the governing body for field hockey in Taiwan.

Taiwan participated once in the Asian Games in 2006 and in the Asia Cup in 2013.

== Tournament record ==
=== Asian Games ===
- 2006 – 8th place
- 2026 – Qualified

=== Asia Cup ===
Men's Hockey Asia Cup record
| Year | Host | Position | Pld | W | D | L | GF | GA |
|---|---|---|---|---|---|---|---|---|
| 1982 to 2009 | | did not qualify | | | | | | |
| 2013 | Ipoh, Malaysia | 8th | 5 | 0 | 1 | 4 | 8 | 41 |
| 2017 | Dhaka, Bangladesh | did not qualify | | | | | | |
| 2022 | Jakarta, Indonesia | did not qualify | | | | | | |
| 2025 | Rajgir, India | 8th | 5 | 0 | 0 | 5 | 7 | 40 |
| Total | | 8th place | 10 | 0 | 1 | 9 | 15 | 81 |

=== AHF Cup ===
AHF Cup record
| Year | Host | Position |
|---|---|---|
| 1997 | Hong Kong | 7th |
| 2002 | Hong Kong | 2nd |
| 2008 | Singapore | 5th |
| 2012 | Bangkok, Thailand | 4th |
| 2016 | Hong Kong | 7th |
| 2022 | Jakarta, Indonesia | did not participate |
| 2025 | Jakarta, Indonesia | 2nd |
| Highest finish | | 2nd place |

=== FIH Hockey Series ===
- 2018–19 – First round

=== Indoor Hockey Asia Cup ===
Indoor Hockey Asia Cup
| Year | Rank | Matches | Goals |
|---|---|---|---|
| 2008 | DNP | - | - |
| 2009 | DNP | - | - |
| 2010 | DNP | - | - |
| 2012 | 5th | 3-1-3 | 25-37 |
| 2014 | 4th | 2-0-3 | 20-23 |
| 2015 | DNP | - | - |
| 2017 | 8th | 0-0-5 | 14-33 |
| 2019 | 8th | 1-0-4 | 11-35 |
| 2022 | 6th | 1-0-6 | 16-50 |
| 2024 | DNP | - | - |
| Total | 5/10 | 7-1-16 | 86-178 |

- 2012: KAZ 6-5 TPE PP

== Results & Fixtures ==
=== 2026 ===
==== 2026 Asian Games Qualifier ====
| 2 April 2026 Pool B | Bangladesh | 4–3 | Chinese Taipei | Bangkok, Thailand |
| 10:00 | As. Islam 15', 22'; Am. Islam 34'; Emon 59' | Report | Li 4', 59'; Hsieh 60' | Stadium: Royal Thai Air Force Hockey Stadium |

| 3 April 2026 Pool B | Chinese Taipei | 0–8 | Uzbekistan | Bangkok, Thailand |
| 10:00 | | Report | Husanov 26', 27'; Salimjonov 35', 41', 54'; Mirzakarimov 47'; Khaytboev 47'; Khakimov 53' | Stadium: Royal Thai Air Force Hockey Stadium |

| 6 April 2026 Pool B | Chinese Taipei | 3–1 | Sri Lanka | Bangkok, Thailand |
| 12:00 | Chang 27'; Wei 44'; Lu 49' | Report | Karunamunige 13' | Stadium: Royal Thai Air Force Hockey Stadium |

| 9 April 2026 5/8th Classification | Thailand | 2–3 | Chinese Taipei | Bangkok, Thailand |
| 09:15 | Rungniyom 21'; Thawichat 28' | Report | Chang 35'; Hsieh 46', 59' | Stadium: Royal Thai Air Force Hockey Stadium |

| 10 April 2026 5th place game | Chinese Taipei | 2–3 | Bangladesh | Bangkok, Thailand |
| 11:30 | Wei 11'; Lo 34' | Report | As. Islam 7', 17'; Samin 38' | Stadium: Royal Thai Air Force Hockey Stadium |

== See also ==
- Chinese Taipei women's national field hockey team
