= Arshad Hossain =

Bangladeshi field hockey player

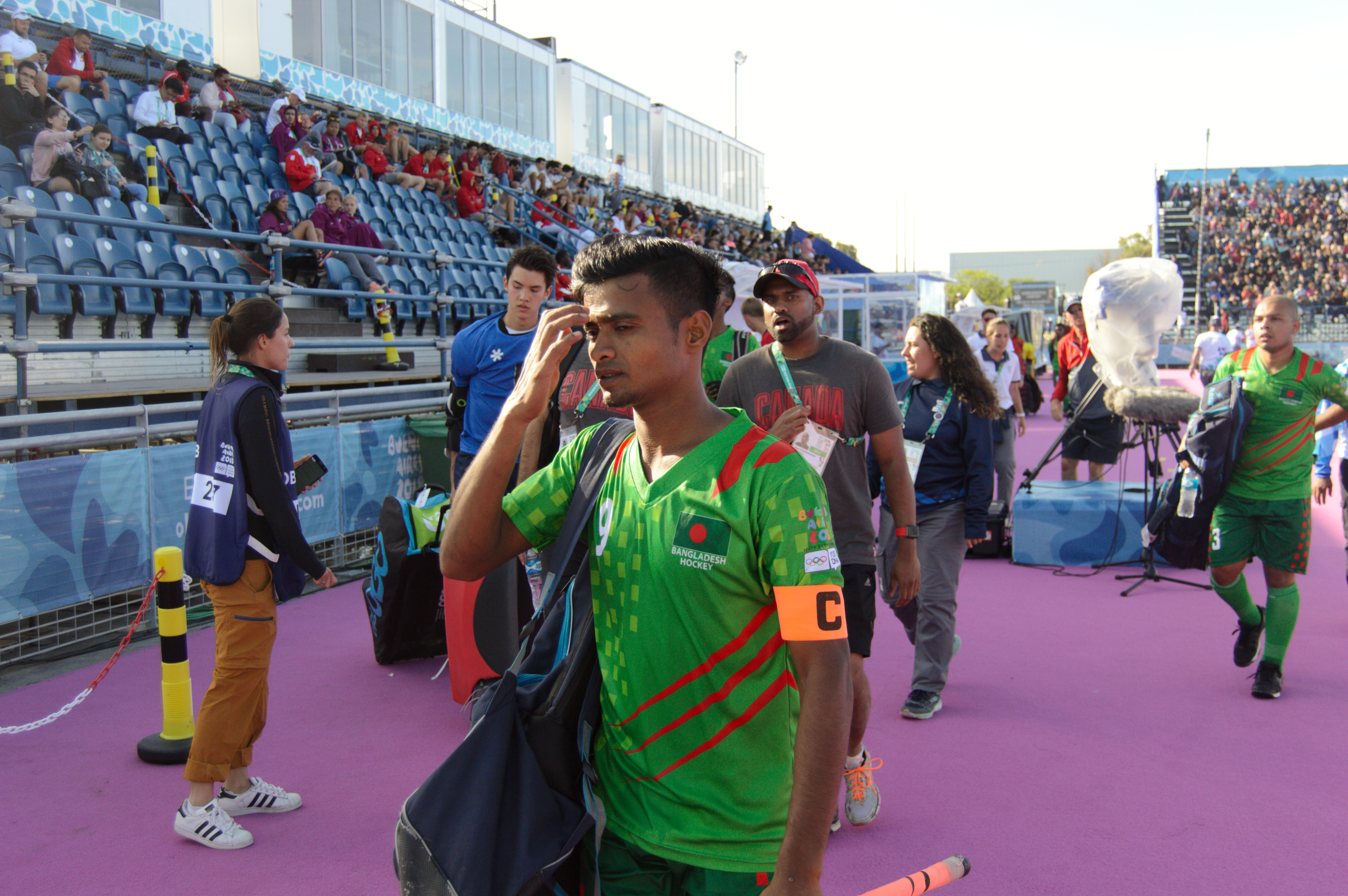
- tournament at the 2018 Summer Youth Olympics

Personal information
- Full name: Mohammad Arshad Hossain
- Born: 1 July 2001 (age 25)
- Height: 162 cm (5 ft 4 in)
- Weight: 55 kg (121 lb)

Sport
- Sport: Field hockey
- Position: Forward
- Club: ACME Chattogram
Senior career
Years	Team	Caps	Goals
2022–	ACME Chattogram	-	-
National team
Years	Team	Caps	Goals
2018	Bangladesh U-18	7	(4)
2014-2015	Bangladesh U-21	16	(4)
2016-	Bangladesh	46	(19)
Medal record
Men's field hockey
Representing Bangladesh
Men's AHF Cup
Gold medal – first place	2016 Hong Kong	Team
Gold medal – first place	2022 Indonesia	Team
Bronze medal – third place	2025 Indonesia	Team
South Asian Games
Bronze medal – third place	2016 Guwahati	Team
Boys' Asia Cup
Silver medal – second place	2016 Dhaka

Mohammad Arshad Hossain (Bengali: আরশাদ হোসেন; born 1 July 2001) is a Bangladeshi field hockey player and is an international player in Bangladesh. He is a player of Bangladesh national field hockey team.

== Honours ==
=== Bangladesh ===
- Men's AHF Cup: 2016, 2022
- South Asian Games bronze medal: 2016

=== ACME Chattogram ===
- Hockey Champions Trophy Bangladesh: 2022
