= 2025 Men's FIH Hockey World Cup Qualifiers – Asia Play-offs =

Field hockey tournament

2025 Men's FIH Hockey World Cup Qualifiers (Asia Play-offs)
Tournament details
- Host country: Bangladesh
- City: Dhaka
- Dates: 13–16 November
- Teams: 2 (from 1 confederation)
- Venue: Maulana Bhasani Hockey Stadium

Final positions
- Champions: Pakistan
- Runner-up: Bangladesh

Tournament statistics
- Matches played: 3
- Goals scored: 31 (10.33 per match)
- Top scorer: (Pakistan) Sufyan Khan (8 goals)

The 2025 Men's FIH Hockey World Cup Qualifiers – Asia Play-offs was a three-game series between Bangladesh and Pakistan to decide the last team participating at the 2026 Men's FIH Hockey World Cup Qualifiers. It was held from 13 to 16 November 2025 at the Maulana Bhasani Hockey Stadium in Dhaka, Bangladesh.

Pakistan withdrew from the 2025 Men's Hockey Asia Cup due to security concerns which meant they could not qualify for the 2026 Men's FIH Hockey World Cup directly or via the qualifiers. As this was seen as a force majeure by the International Hockey Federation, Pakistan received the chance to stll qualify for the World cup qualifiers with a play-off against the sixth-placed team at the 2025 Asia Cup, which was Bangladesh. Pakistan won all the three games to qualify for the World Cup qualifiers.

== Results ==
=== Standings ===
Pos	Team	Pld	W	D	L	GF	GA	GD	Pts	Qualification
1	Pakistan	3	3	0	0	26	5	+21	9	Hockey World Cup Qualifiers
2	Bangladesh (H)	3	0	0	3	5	26	−21	0	

Source: FIH
Rules for classification: 1) points; 2) matches won; 3) goal difference; 4) goals for; 5) head-to-head result; 6) field goals for.
(H) Hosts

=== Fixtures ===
All times are (UTC+6).

13 November 2025
14:00

Bangladesh	2–8	Pakistan
Hossain 15'; Islam 58'	Report	Butt 4'; Nadeem 19', 56'; Afraz 24', 30'; Ali 32'; Rana 44'; Shahid 47'

Umpires:
Mazin Al-Shukaili (OMA)
Hideki Kinoshita (JPN)

14 November 2025
15:00

Bangladesh	0–8	Pakistan
	Report	Sufyan 6', 19'; Rana 13', 57'; Rana 30+'; Shahid 32'; Afraz 53'; Butt 19'

Umpires:
Mohd Ismady Alis (MAS)
Hussain Al Hasani (OMA)

16 November 2025
14:00

Bangladesh	3–10	Pakistan
Abdullah 19'; Hasan 44'; Islam 57'	Report	Sufyan 8', 10', 16', 29', 34', 57'; Rehman 15', 59'; Nadeem 40'; Rana 52'

Umpires:
Mazin Al-Shukaili (OMA)
Mohd Ismady Alis (MAS)
