= Naim Uddin =

Sport
- Sport: Field hockey
- Position: Midfielder
- Club: Abahani Limited Dhaka
Senior career
Years	Team	Caps	Goals
2022–	Abahani Limited Dhaka	-	-
National team
Years	Team	Caps	Goals
2016–	Bangladesh	25	-
Medal record
Men's field hockey
Representing Bangladesh
Men's AHF Cup
Gold medal – first place	2016 Hong Kong	Team
Gold medal – first place	2022 Indonesia	Team
Bronze medal – third place	2025 Indonesia	Team
South Asian Games
Bronze medal – third place	2016 Guwahati	Team
Boys' Asia Cup
Silver medal – second place	2016 Dhaka

Naim Uddin (Bengali: নাইম উদ্দিন) is a Bangladeshi field hockey player and is an international player in Bangladesh. He is a player of Bangladesh national field hockey team.

== Honours ==
=== Bangladesh ===
- Men's AHF Cup: 2016, 2022
- South Asian Games bronze medal: 2016
