= Puskar Khisa =

Bangladeshi field hockey player

Pushkar Khisa Mimo
Personal information
- Born: 30 June 1993 (age 33) Rangamati, Bangladesh

Sport
- Sport: Field hockey
- Position: Forward
- Club: Rupayan City Cumilla
Senior career
Years	Team	Caps	Goals
2014–2022	Abahani Limited Dhaka	-	-
2022–	Rupayan City Cumilla	-	-
National team
Years	Team	Caps	Goals
2014–	Bangladesh	83	(39)
Medal record
Men's field hockey
Representing Bangladesh
Men's AHF Cup
Gold medal – first place	2016 Hong kong	Team
Gold medal – first place	2022 Indonesia	Team
Bronze medal – third place	2025 Indonesia	Team
South Asian Games
Bronze medal – third place	2016 Guwahati	Team

Puskar Khisa is a Bangladeshi field hockey player and is an international player in Bangladesh. He is a player of Bangladesh national field hockey team.

== Honours ==
=== Bangladesh ===
- Men's AHF Cup: 2016, 2022
- South Asian Games bronze medal: 2016
