= Thailand men's national field hockey team =

Men's national field hockey team representing Thailand

Thailand
- Association: Thailand Hockey Association
- Confederation: AHF (Asia)
- Head Coach: Tai Beng Hai
- Captain: Pichai Kongman

FIH ranking
- Current: 43 ▲5 (4 October 2026)
- Highest: 40 (September 2019–present)
- Lowest: 62 (2007)

Asian Games
- Appearances: 8 (first in 1966)
- Best result: 8th (1966, 1970, 1978, 2026)

Asia Cup
- Appearances: 2 (first in 1993)
- Best result: 8th (1993)

The Thailand men's national field hockey team represents Thailand in international men's field hockey competitions. As of September 2026, they are ranked 48th in the world.

== Current squad ==
The following is the Thailand roster in the men's field hockey tournament of the 2026 Asian Games.

Head Coach: (Malaysia) Tai Beng Hai

5. Kritsada Chueamkaew
8. Narentorn Deesa
9. Udomchok Phokphun
10. Jiranat Sae-Aew
11. Nopphadon Samarng
12. Pichet Chaimanee
13. Worawut Kaeochianghwang
14. Warakorn Kiram
15. Natthawat Kuengsamrong
16. Nithikon Mongsri
19. Arfis Hayeeda-Oh
20. Borirak Harapan
22. Chanachol Rungniyom
23. Suriya Kasonbua
28. Kankawee Boonsri
29. Tanakit Juntakian (C)
31. Patinya Panseemek (GK)
32. Thawin Phomjunt (GK)
33. Kunakorn Jaitas
38. Konlawat Khammi

== Competitive record ==
=== Asian Games ===
Asian Games
| Year | Host city | Rank | Matches | Goals |
|---|---|---|---|---|
| 1966 | Bangkok, Thailand | 8th | 0-0-5 | 0-20 |
| 1970 | Bangkok, Thailand | 8th | 0-3-2 | 1-5 |
| 1978 | Bangkok, Thailand | 8th | 0-2-3 | 2-13 |
| 1986 | Seongnam, South Korea | 9th | 0-0-4 | 0-32 |
| 1998 | Bangkok, Thailand | 10th | 0-0-5 | 1-28 |
| 2018 | Jakarta, Indonesia | 9th | 2-0-4 | 6-28 |
| 2022 | Hangzhou, China | 11th | 1-0-5 | 6-37 |
| 2026 | Aichi and Nagoya, Japan | 8th | 2-0-5 | 6-40 |
| Total | 8/18 | - | 5-5-33 | 22-203 |

- 1966: HKG - THA Results Unknown
- 1978: SRI - THA Results Unknown

=== Asia Cup ===
Asia Cup
| Year | Host city | Rank | Matches | Goals |
|---|---|---|---|---|
| 1994 | Hiroshima, Japan | 8th | 0-0-5 | 0-62 |
| 2007 | Chennai, India | 11th | 0-0-6 | 1-71 |
| Total | 2/12 | - | 0-0-11 | 1-133 |

=== AHF Cup ===
AHF Cup
| Year | Host city | Position | Matches | Goals |
|---|---|---|---|---|
| 2008 | Singapore | 8th | 0-0-4 | 8-21 |
| 2012 | Bangkok, Thailand | 7th | 1-0-3 | 5-14 |
| 2016 | Hong Kong | 6th | 0-3-2 | 8-11 |
| 2022 | Jakarta, Indonesia | 5th | 3-0-2 | 7-13 |
| 2025 | Jakarta, Indonesia | 8th | 1-2-3 | 11-16 |
| Total | 5/7 | - | 5-5-14 | 39-75 |

- 2008: TPE ? - ? THA No Data (THA lose in normal time or Penalty)

=== World League ===
World League
| Year | Round | Host | Results | Matches | Goals |
|---|---|---|---|---|---|
| 2012–13 | Round 1 | Singapore | Eliminated | 0-1-2 | 2-13 |
| 2014–15 | Round 1 | Muscat, Oman | Eliminated | 0-0-3 | 0-27 |
| 2016–17 | Round 1 | Singapore | Eliminated | 4-0-2 | 26-20 |
| Total | 3/3 | - | - | 4-1-7 | 28-60 |

=== Hockey Series ===
Hockey Series
| Year | Round | Host city | Position | Matches | Goals |
|---|---|---|---|---|---|
| 2017-18 | Open | Singapore | Advanced | 4-0-2 | 20-13 |
| 2017-18 | Finals | Le Touquet, France | Withdrew | | |

=== Indoor Hockey Asia Cup ===
Indoor Hockey Asia Cup
| Year | Rank | Matches | Goals |
|---|---|---|---|
| 2008 | 6th | 0-0-6 | 12-45 |
| 2009 | 5th | 0-1-3 | 3-24 |
| 2010 | 5th | 2-0-4 | 13-32 |
| 2012 | 4th | 3-1-3 | 22-33 |
| 2014 | DNP | | |
| 2015 | DNP | | |
| 2017 | 7th | 2-1-2 | 20-20 |
| 2019 | 5th | 3-0-2 | 20-11 |
| 2022 | 5th | 3-0-4 | 26-36 |
| 2024 | 4th | 2-0-4 | 33-34 |
| Total | 8/10 | 15-3-28 | 149-235 |

- 2009 IRI - THA Unknown

== Results & Fixtures ==
=== 2026 ===
==== 2026 Asian Games Qualifier ====
| 2 April 2026 Pool A | Thailand | 2–2 | Kazakhstan | Bangkok, Thailand |
| 16:00 | Chueamkaew 3'; Juntakian 39' | Report | Tashkeyev 9', 44' | Stadium: Royal Thai Air Force Hockey Stadium |

| 4 April 2026 Pool A | Thailand | 1–2 | Oman | Bangkok, Thailand |
| 16:00 | Juntakian 25' | Report | Al-Maaini 13'; Al Fazari 30' | Stadium: Royal Thai Air Force Hockey Stadium |

| 6 April 2026 Pool A | Indonesia | 1–0 | Thailand | Bangkok, Thailand |
| 16:00 | Al Ardh 12' | Report | | Stadium: Royal Thai Air Force Hockey Stadium |

| 7 April 2026 Pool A | Thailand | 4–1 | Hong Kong | Bangkok, Thailand |
| 16:00 | Chaimanee 3', 60'; Chueamkaew 32'; Rungniyom 45' | Report | Haider-Qismat 32' | Stadium: Royal Thai Air Force Hockey Stadium |

| 9 April 2026 5/8th Classification | Thailand | 2–3 | Chinese Taipei | Bangkok, Thailand |
| 09:15 | Rungniyom 21'; Thawichat 28' | Report | Chang 35'; Hsieh 46', 59' | Stadium: Royal Thai Air Force Hockey Stadium |

| 10 April 2026 Seventh place game | Thailand | 2–2 (2–1 p) | Hong Kong | Bangkok, Thailand |
| 09:15 | Khammi 1', 4' | Report | Haider-Qismat 6', 33' | Stadium: Royal Thai Air Force Hockey Stadium |
| | Penalties |
| | Juntakian (penalty shoot-out missed); Chaimanee (penalty shoot-out scored); Khammi (penalty shoot-out missed); Deesa (penalty shoot-out scored) | | (penalty shoot-out scored) Chuen; (penalty shoot-out missed) Kuldeep; (penalty shoot-out missed) Udhampreet; (penalty shoot-out missed) Jasminder; (penalty shoot-out missed) Iu |

==== 2026 Asian Games ====
| 20 September 2026 Pool B | Pakistan | 9–0 | Thailand | Kakamigahara, Japan |
| 19:00 | Shakeel 8'; Butt 12'; Nadeem 20', 37', 43'; Khan 22', 23'; Rana 31'; Shahid 34' | Report | | Stadium: Gifu Prefectural Green Stadium |

| 22 September 2026 Pool B | Thailand | 1–8 | China | Kakamigahara, Japan |
| 13:00 | Chaimanee 53' | Report | Gao 12', 44', 56'; Chen 13'; Zhang 30'; He 40', 52'; Zhao 55' | Stadium: Gifu Prefectural Green Stadium |

| 24 September 2026 Pool B | Thailand | 0–10 | Malaysia | Kakamigahara, Japan |
| 09:00 | | Report | Saari 18', 35'; Abdu Rauf 20'; Azrai 21', 41'; Mohd Zain 28'; Hamsani 35'; Silverius 55'; Jali 59'; Anuar 60' | Stadium: Gifu Prefectural Green Stadium |

| 26 September 2026 Pool B | Oman | 0–1 | Thailand | Kakamigahara, Japan |
| 09:00 | | Report | Juntakian 57' | Stadium: Gifu Prefectural Green Stadium |

| 28 September 2026 Pool B | Uzbekistan | 1–3 | Thailand | Kakamigahara, Japan |
| 13:00 | Komilov 43' | Report | Chueamkaew 5'; Khammi 14'; Hayeeda-Oh 15' | Stadium: Gifu Prefectural Green Stadium |

| 1 October 2026 5/8 Classification | Japan | 9–1 | Thailand | Kakamigahara, Japan |
| 11:30 | Fujishima 3', 29'; T. Tanaka 12', 17', 25', 41'; Kawabe 14', 52'; Yamasaki 22' | Report | Kuengsamrong 53' | Stadium: Gifu Prefectural Green Stadium |

| 3 October 2026 7th place match | Thailand | 0–3 | Bangladesh | Kakamigahara, Japan |
| 11:30 | | Report | Sarkar 3'; Am. Islam 27'; As. Islam 53' | Stadium: Gifu Prefectural Green Stadium |

== See also ==
- Thailand women's national field hockey team
