= 2022 Men's AHF Cup =

Field hockey qualification tournament

Tournament details
- Host country: Indonesia
- City: Jakarta
- Dates: 11–20 March
- Teams: 9 (from 1 confederation)
- Venue(s): GBK Hockey Field

Final positions
- Champions: Bangladesh (4th title)
- Runner-up: Oman
- Third place: Sri Lanka

Tournament statistics
- Matches played: 24
- Goals scored: 137 (5.71 per match)
- Top scorer(s): (Oman) Rashad Al Fazari (10 goals)
- Best player: (Sri Lanka) Kusal Weerappuli
- Best young player: (Oman) Aliyas Al-Noufali
- Best goalkeeper: (Bangladesh) Biplob Kujur

The 2022 Men's AHF Cup was the sixth edition of the Men's AHF Cup, a field hockey qualification tournament for the Men's Hockey Asia Cup organized by the Asian Hockey Federation. The event was held at the GBK Hockey Field in Jakarta, Indonesia from 11 to 20 March 2022.

The top two teams qualified for the 2022 Men's Hockey Asia Cup.

== Preliminary round ==
=== Pool A ===
Pos	Team	Pld	W	D	L	GF	GA	GD	Pts	Qualification
1	Sri Lanka	3	3	0	0	15	2	+13	9	Semi-finals
2	Kazakhstan	3	1	0	2	7	6	+1	3	Semi-finals
3	Uzbekistan	3	1	0	2	2	7	−5	3	
4	Thailand	3	1	0	2	3	12	−9	3	
5	China	0	0	0	0	0	0	0	0	Withdrew

Source: FIH
Rules for classification: 1) points; 2) matches won; 3) goal difference; 4) goals for; 5) head-to-head result; 6) field goals for.

11 March 2022
15:45

Thailand	0–6	Kazakhstan
	Report	Dyussebekov 9'; Yelubayev 11'; Urmanov 34', 47'; Sansyzbayev 42'; Tashkeyev 54'

Umpires:
Yaser Khurshid (PAK)
Muhammad Pial (BAN)

11 March 2022
18:00

Sri Lanka	5–0	Uzbekistan
Doranagala 8', 11'; Fernando 14'; Kulathunga 20'; Sudusinghe 37'	Report

Umpires:
Shigeki Kodama (JPN)
Mazin Al-Shukaili (OMA)

12 March 2022
16:45

Thailand	1–0	Uzbekistan
Boon-Art 22'	Report

Umpires:
Ilmu Wijaya (INA)
Rashed Hasan Rony (BAN)

14 March 2022
14:30

Sri Lanka	6–2	Thailand
Bandara 10', 23'; Weerappuli 14'; Sudusinghe 45'; Fernando 56'; Panthie 57'	Report	Boon-Art 3'; Chueamkaew 12'

Umpires:
Ahmed Elsayed (EGY)
Morteza Ahmadi (IRI)

15 March 2022
14:30

Kazakhstan	0–4	Sri Lanka
	Report	Doranagala 15'; Ranasingha 23', 53'; Rathnayake 43'

Umpires:
Khalid Hussain (HKG)
Shigeki Kodama (JPN)

17 March 2022
14:30

Uzbekistan	2–1	Kazakhstan
Khaytboev 5'; Vakhobjonov 25'	Report	Toibekov 6'

Umpires:
Ilmu Wijaya (INA)
Mazin Al-Shukaili (OMA)

=== Pool B ===
Pos	Team	Pld	W	D	L	GF	GA	GD	Pts	Qualification
1	Bangladesh	4	4	0	0	23	6	+17	12	Semi-finals
2	Oman	4	3	0	1	27	7	+20	9	Semi-finals
3	Indonesia (H)	4	2	0	2	13	18	−5	6	
4	Iran	4	1	0	3	6	24	−18	3	
5	Singapore	4	0	0	4	4	18	−14	0	

Source: FIH
Rules for classification: 1) points; 2) matches won; 3) goal difference; 4) goals for; 5) head-to-head result; 6) field goals for.
(H) Hosts

11 March 2022
13:30

Singapore	1–2	Iran
Silas 22'	Report	Shahrokhi 34', 50'

Umpires:
Khalid Hussain (HKG)
Elyor Kholmirzaev (UZB)

11 March 2022
20:15

Bangladesh	7–2	Indonesia
Rahman 15', 27'; Hossain 20'; Sobuj 23'; Khisa 49'; Mahmud 55'; Sarkar 55'	Report	Ardam 56'; Asasi 57'

Umpires:
Ahmed El-Sayed (EGY)
Mohomead Nawshad (SRI)

12 March 2022
14:30

Oman	10–2	Iran
Al Fazari 4', 12', 39', 52'; Al-Shibli 19'; Al Lawati 25', 41'; Al Shaaibi 28'; Al Nasseri 55'; Al Qasmi 59'	Report	Taherirad 5', 36'

Umpires:
Khalid Hussain (HKG)
Makhsudbek Urmanov (KAZ)

12 March 2022
19:00

Singapore	2–3	Indonesia
Kahar 4', 45'	Report	Fathur 19'; Al Ardh 26', 59'

Umpires:
Shigeki Kodama (JPN)
Phiraphat Niensupornphand (THA)

14 March 2022
16:45

Bangladesh	7–0	Singapore
Islam 5'; Sobuj 14', 27', 59'; Hossain 46'; Rahman 54'; Khisa 60'	Report

Umpires:
Phiraphat Niensupornphand (THA)
Yaser Khurshid (PAK)

14 March 2022
19:00

Oman	9–1	Indonesia
Al Fazari 10', 16', 51'; Al Lawati 22'; K Al Shaaibi 30'; A Al Shaaibi 39', 53'; Al Nofali 51'; Bait Shamaiaa 59'	Report	Al Ardh 17'

Umpires:
Shigeki Kodama (JPN)
Khalid Hussain (HKG)

15 March 2022
16:45

Iran	2–6	Bangladesh
Salehipour 4'; Taherirad 41'	Report	Islam 9', 29', 39'; Rahman 34'; Hossain 36'; Sarkar 53'

Umpires:
Ahmed Elsayed (EGY)
Mohomead Nawshad (SRI)

15 March 2022
19:00

Singapore	1–6	Oman
Naidu 47'	Report	Al Shaaibi 4', 28', 41'; Al Fazari 24'; Al Lawati 25'; Al-Noufali 56'

Umpires:
Yaser Khurshid (PAK)
Elyor Kholmirzaev (UZB)

17 March 2022
16:45

Bangladesh	3–2	Oman
Rahman 8', 56', 58'	Report	Al Fazari 32'; Al Lawati 48'

Umpires:
Ahmed Elsayed (EGY)
Khalid Hussain (HKG)

17 March 2022
19:00

Indonesia	7–0	Iran
Ardam 5'; Al Ardh 9', 18', 29'; Prastyo 25'; Alam 44'	Report

Umpires:
Phiraphat Niensupornphand (THA)
Mohomead Nawshad (SRI)

== Fifth to eighth place classification ==
=== Bracket ===
Semi-finals
19 March
Uzbekistan	2 (2)
Iran (s.o.)	2 (3)
19 March
Indonesia	0
Thailand	1

Fifth place
20 March
Iran	1
Thailand	3
Seventh place
20 March
Uzbekistan	1
Indonesia	6

=== 5–8th place semi-finals ===
19 March 2022
11:30

Uzbekistan	2–2	Iran
Khaytboev 52'; Vakhobjonov 55'	Report	Shahrokhi 5'; Salehipour 44'
Penalties
Akhmadkhodjaev (penalty shoot-out scored); Mamajonov (penalty shoot-out missed); Aslanov (penalty shoot-out missed); Khaytboev (penalty shoot-out scored); Khakimov (penalty shoot-out missed)	2–3	(penalty shoot-out scored) Bohlouli; (penalty shoot-out missed) Hamedi; (penalty shoot-out missed) Azizi; (penalty shoot-out scored) Karimi; (penalty shoot-out scored) Taherirad

Umpires:
Phiraphat Niensupornphand (THA)
Muhammad Ali Khan (BAN)

19 March 2022
19:00

Indonesia	0–1	Thailand
	Report	Boon-Art 11'

Umpires:
Khalid Hussain (HKG)
Rashed Hasan Rony (BAN)

=== Seventh place game ===
20 March 2022
11:30

Uzbekistan	1–6	Indonesia
Akhmadkhodjaev 26'	Report	Maulana 4'; Prastyo 14'; Al Ardh 18'; Ardam 10', 40', 42'

Umpires:
Rashed Hasan Rony (BAN)
Morteza Ahmadi (IRI)

=== Fifth place game ===
20 March 2022
14:00

Iran	1–3	Thailand
Taherirad 59'	Report	Chueamkaew 29'; Puttasem 56'; Rungniyom 57'

Umpires:
Mohomead Nawshad (SRI)
Mazin Al-Shukaili (OMA)

== First to fourth place classification ==
=== Bracket ===
Semi-finals
19 March
Sri Lanka	1
Oman	2
19 March
Bangladesh	8
Kazakhstan	1

Final
20 March
Oman	1 (3)
Bangladesh (s.o.)	1 (5)
Third place
20 March
Sri Lanka	4
Kazakhstan	3

=== Semi-finals ===
19 March 2022
14:00

Sri Lanka	1–2	Oman
Rathnayake 35'	Report	Al Fazari 18'; Al Nasseri 31'

Umpires:
Shigeki Kodama (JPN)
Yaser Khurshid (PAK)

19 March 2022
16:30

Bangladesh	8–1	Kazakhstan
Islam 7', 9', 40', 41'; Rahman 34', 45'; Mahmud 49'; Sobuj 51'	Report	Yelubayev 55'

Umpires:
Ahmed Elsayed (EGY)
Mohomead Nawshad (SRI)

=== Third place game ===
20 March 2022
16:30

Sri Lanka	4–3	Kazakhstan
Sudusinghe 32'; Rathnayake 32'; Panthie 45'; Weerappuli 56'	Report	Dyussebekov 26', 58'; Yelubayev 38'

Umpires:
Yaser Khurshid (PAK)
Phiraphat Niensupornphand (THA)

=== Final ===
20 March 2022
19:00

Oman	1–1	Bangladesh
Al Lawati 19'	Report	Sobuj 14'
Penalties
Al Fazari (penalty shoot-out scored); F Al Shaaibi (penalty shoot-out scored); A Al Shaaibi (penalty shoot-out scored); Bait Shamaiaa (penalty shoot-out missed)	3–5	(penalty shoot-out scored) Shetul; (penalty shoot-out scored) Sobuj; (penalty shoot-out scored) Sarkar; (penalty shoot-out scored) Naim Uddin; (penalty shoot-out scored) Khisa

Umpires:
Ahmed Elsayed (EGY)
Khalid Hussain (HKG)

== Final standings ==
Pos	Team	Qualification
1	Bangladesh	2022 Asia Cup
2	Oman	2022 Asia Cup
3	Sri Lanka	
4	Kazakhstan	
5	Thailand	
6	Iran	
7	Indonesia (H)	
8	Uzbekistan	
9	Singapore	

Source: FIH
(H) Host

== Goalscorers ==
There were 137 goals scored in 24 matches, for an average of 5.71 goals per match.

10 goals

- (Oman) Rashad Al Fazari

9 goals

- (Bangladesh) Khorshadur Rahman

8 goals

- (Bangladesh) Ashraful Islam

7 goals

- (Indonesia) Aulia Al Ardh

6 goals

- (Bangladesh) Shohanur Sobuj
- (Oman) Fahad Al Lawati
- (Oman) Ammaar Al Shaaibi

5 goals

- (Indonesia) Ardam

4 goals

- (Iran) Navid Taherirad

3 goals

- (Indonesia) Alfandy Prastyo
- (Iran) Mahdi Shahrokhi
- (Kazakhstan) Yerkebulan Dyussebekov
- (Kazakhstan) Aman Yelubayev
- (Sri Lanka) Ishanka Doranagala
- (Sri Lanka) Suresh Rathnayake
- (Sri Lanka) Sanda Sudusinghe
- (Thailand) Thanakrit Boon-Art

2 goals

- (Bangladesh) Arshad Hossain
- (Bangladesh) Puskar Khisa
- (Bangladesh) Rashel Mahmud
- (Bangladesh) Roman Sarkar
- (Iran) Mohammadali Salehipour
- (Kazakhstan) Daulet Urmanov
- (Oman) Ashraf Al Nasseri
- (Singapore) Bazil Kahar
- (Sri Lanka) Dhananjana Bandara
- (Sri Lanka) Udayashan Fernando
- (Sri Lanka) Lahiru Panthie
- (Sri Lanka) Daammika Ranasingha
- (Sri Lanka) Kusal Weerappuli
- (Thailand) Kritsada Chueamkaew
- (Uzbekistan) Gaybullo Khaytboev
- (Uzbekistan) Mukhammadkodir Vakhobjonov

1 goal

- (Bangladesh) Milon Hossain
- (Indonesia) Asrul Alam
- (Indonesia) Ahdan Asasi
- (Indonesia) Mochamad Fathur
- (Indonesia) Nurul Maulana
- (Kazakhstan) Nurkhan Sansyzbayev
- (Kazakhstan) Yermek Tashkeyev
- (Kazakhstan) Meirlan Toibekov
- (Oman) Ahmed Al Nofali
- (Oman) Asaad Mubarak Al Qasmi
- (Oman) Khalid Al Shaaibi
- (Oman) Aliyas Al-Noufali
- (Oman) Asama Al-Shibli
- (Oman) Mahmood Bait Shamaiaa
- (Singapore) Dineshraj Naidu
- (Singapore) Silas Noor
- (Sri Lanka) Rajitha Kulathunga
- (Thailand) Singha Puttasem
- (Thailand) Chanachol Rungniyom
- (Uzbekistan) Khotamjon Akhmadkhodjaev

Source: FIH

== See also ==
- 2022 Men's Hockey Asia Cup
- Field hockey at the 2022 Asian Games – Men's Qualifier
