= Fazla Rabby =

Bangladeshi field hockey player

Personal information
- Born: 6 April 1999 (age 27) Bangladesh

Sport
- Sport: Field hockey
- Position: Midfielder
- Club: Metro Express Barishal
Senior career
Years	Team	Caps	Goals
2022–	Metro Express Barishal	-	-
National team
Years	Team	Caps	Goals
2017–	Bangladesh	18	-
Medal record
Men's field hockey
Representing Bangladesh
Men's AHF Cup
Gold medal – first place	2022 Indonesia	Team
Bronze medal – third place	2025 Indonesia	Team
Boys' Asia Cup
Silver medal – second place	2016 Dhaka

Fazla Rabby (Bengali: ফজলে রাব্বী) is a Bangladeshi field hockey player and is an international player in Bangladesh. He is a player of Bangladesh national field hockey team.

== Honours ==
=== Bangladesh ===
- Men's AHF Cup: 2016, 2022
