= Abu Nippon =

Bangladeshi field hockey player

Personal information
- Full name: Abu Sayed Nippon
- National team: Bangladesh Hockey
- Born: Bangladesh

Abu Nippon is a Bangladeshi field hockey player who plays as a goalkeeper. He is a member of the Bangladesh men's national field hockey team.
