= Chinese Taipei Hockey Association =

Governing body of field hockey in Taiwan

- Sport: Field hockey
- Jurisdiction: Republic of China (Taiwan)
- Affiliation: FIH
- Regional affiliation: AHF
- President: Tsai Yi Chu
- Secretary: Chih-Peng Wu
- (Chinese Taipei)

The Chinese Taipei Hockey Association is the governing body of field hockey in Republic of China (Taiwan). It is affiliated to FIH International Hockey Federation and AHF Asian Hockey Federation. The headquarters of the federation are in Taipei.

Tsai Yi Chu is the President of the Chinese Taipei Hockey Association and Chih-Peng Wu is the Secretary.

== See also ==
- Chinese Taipei men's national field hockey team
- Chinese Taipei women's national field hockey team
