= 1994 Men's Hockey Asia Cup =

Field hockey competition

Tournament details
- Host country: Japan
- City: Hiroshima
- Dates: 5–14 November
- Teams: 9 (from 1 confederation)

Final positions
- Champions: South Korea (1st title)
- Runner-up: India
- Third place: Pakistan

Tournament statistics
- Matches played: 24
- Goals scored: 145 (6.04 per match)

The 1994 Men's Hockey Asia Cup was the fourth edition of the Men's Hockey Asia Cup, the quadrennial international men's field hockey championship of Asia organized by the Asian Hockey Federation. It was held from 5 to 14 November 1994, in Hiroshima, Japan.

South Korea won their first Asia Cup hockey title defeating India 1–0 with captain Park Sin-heung scoring the winner for them when he scored off a penalty stroke in the 56th minute. Pakistan defeated Malaysia 5–2, to claim the third position.

== Preliminary round ==
=== Group A ===
Pos	Team	Pld	W	D	L	GF	GA	GD	Pts	Qualification
1	Pakistan	3	3	0	0	33	2	+31	6	Semi-finals
2	Malaysia	3	2	0	1	27	8	+19	4	Semi-finals
3	China	3	1	0	2	12	10	+2	2	
4	Thailand	3	0	0	3	0	52	−52	0	

Source: rediff.com

=== Group B ===
Pos	Team	Pld	W	D	L	GF	GA	GD	Pts	Qualification
1	India	4	2	2	0	12	4	+8	6	Semi-finals
2	South Korea	4	2	2	0	8	3	+5	6	Semi-finals
3	Bangladesh	4	1	1	2	4	8	−4	3	
4	Kazakhstan	4	1	1	2	4	8	−4	3	
5	Japan (H)	4	1	0	3	6	11	−5	2	

Source: rediff.com
(H) Hosts

== Fifth to eighth place classification ==
Cross-overs
13 November
China	1
Kazakhstan	2
13 November
Thailand	0
Bangladesh	6

Fifth place
15 November
Kazakhstan	7
Bangladesh	2
Seventh place
15 November
Thailand	0
China	4

== First to fourth classification ==
=== Bracket ===
Semi-finals
13 November
Pakistan	0
South Korea	4
13 November
India	3
Malaysia	2

Final
15 November
South Korea	1
India	0
Third place
15 November
Pakistan	5
Malaysia	2

=== Semi-finals ===
November 13, 1994

South Korea	4–0	Pakistan

November 13, 1994

India	3–2	Malaysia

=== Third and fourth place ===
November 15, 1999

Pakistan	5–2	Malaysia

=== Final ===
15 November 1993

South Korea	1–0	India
Park Sin-heung 56'

== Winners ==
1994 Men's Hockey Asia Cup winners

South Korea
First title

== Final standings ==
1. South Korea
2. India
3. Pakistan
4. Malaysia
5. Kazakhstan
6. Bangladesh
7. China
8. Thailand
9. Japan
