= Bangladesh men's national field hockey team =

Bangladesh
- Association: Bangladesh Hockey Federation
- Confederation: AHF (Asia)
- Head Coach: Gerhard Rach
- Assistant coach(es): Moshiur Rahman Biplob
- Captain: Puskar Khisa
- Most caps: Puskar Khisa (83)
- Top scorer: Puskar Khisa (39)
Home	Away

FIH ranking
- Current: 28 (5 November 2026)
- Lowest: 40 (2011, 2012)

First international
- Thailand 2–2 Bangladesh (Bangkok, Thailand; 10 December 1978)

Biggest win
- Bangladesh 25–0 Afghanistan (Muscat, Oman; 13 March 2018)

Biggest defeat
- Pakistan 17–0 Bangladesh (Bangkok, Thailand; 15 December 1978)

Asian Games
- Appearances: 12 (first in 1978)
- Best result: 6th (1978, 2018)

Asia Cup
- Appearances: 12 (first in 1982)
- Best result: 5th (1982)
Medal record
Men's AHF Cup
Gold medal – first place	2008 Singapore
Gold medal – first place	2012 Bangkok
Gold medal – first place	2016 Hong Kong
Gold medal – first place	2022 Jakarta
Bronze medal – third place	2025 Jakarta
South Asian Games
Bronze medal – third place	1995 Madras
Bronze medal – third place	2010 Dhaka
Bronze medal – third place	2016 Guwahati	Team

The Bangladesh men's national field hockey team represents Bangladesh in men's international field hockey, and has won the bronze medal three times in the South Asian Games. It is administered by the Bangladesh Hockey Federation.

== History ==
=== In India and Pakistan ===
Hockey was introduced in Bengal during the British period. The game was introduced in Dhaka around 1905 under the patronage of Nawab Sir Khwaja Salimullah (1866–1915), when it was confined to the Nawab's family circle. At that time, football was more popular in Bengal. The game made great progress due to the efforts of some sports patrons and organizers. During World War II, a team of the hockey wizard Dhyan Chand, a member of the Gurkha Regiment, played an exhibition match at Armanitola in Dhaka.

With the Partition of Bengal in 1947, the growth of hockey was impeded. Many of the people who played and loved hockey migrated to India. As a result, hockey in East Pakistan turned into a seasonal game. Hockey was played only for two or three months in the year also due to the inadequacy of grounds and unfavorable weather conditions in other months of the year. The East Pakistan hockey team took part in a number of tournaments including the All Pakistan National Hockey Championship. In 1969, Dhaka successfully hosted the final round of the Pakistan National Hockey Championship.

=== In Bangladesh ===
The Bangladesh Hockey Federation (BHF) was founded in 1972. The federation acquired full membership of the International Hockey Federation and of the Asian Hockey Federation in 1975. In 1987, a hockey stadium was built in Dhaka, which is now known as the Maulana Bhasani Hockey Stadium. Since then it has been the home of hockey in Bangladesh and the office of the BHF. The Federation arranges hockey leagues, tournaments, and the National Youth and Senior Championships. At the home level, hockey matches including Premier Division Hockey League, First Division Hockey League, Second Division Hockey League, National Hockey League, National Youth Hockey League, Independence Day Hockey Tournament, National Hockey Championship, National Youth Hockey Championship, Victory Day Hockey Tournament, and School Tournaments. Bangladesh has hosted various international tournaments with distinction.

Bangladesh started taking part in international hockey tournaments by participating in the 1st Junior World Cup for Asia/Oceania zone qualifying round in Kuala Lumpur in 1977. The country also played in the Asian Games in Bangkok in 1978. Bangladesh took part in the 1st Asia Cup in Karachi in 1982. In 1985, Dhaka hosted the Second Asia Hockey Cup, when captained by Chaklader, Bangladesh performed superbly in front of large crowds. India, Pakistan, Korea, Malaysia, China, Japan, Sri Lanka, Singapore, Iran, and Bangladesh took part in this tournament. Bangladesh also hosted an international invitational hockey tournament in 1997, when India, Pakistan and Sri Lanka were the participants.

== Honours ==
=== Tournaments ===
- Men's AHF Cup:
  - (gold) Champions: 2008, 2012, 2016, 2022
  - (bronze) Third Place: 2025
- South Asian Games:
  - (bronze) Bronze Medal: 1995, 2010, 2016

== Players ==
=== Current squad ===
The following players were named for the 2025 Men's Hockey Asia Cup.

Caps updated as of 7 September 2025, after the match against Japan.

No.	Pos.	Player	Date of birth (age)	Caps	Club
1	GK	Abu Sayed Nikson	15 November 1994 (age 31)	39	(Bangladesh) Walton Dhaka
22	GK	Biplob Kujur	22 January 2001 (age 25)	4	(Bangladesh) Mohammedan SC
2	DF	Ashraful Islam	5 January 1999 (age 27)	23	(Bangladesh) Walton Dhaka
3	DF	Farhad Shetul	9 December 1995 (age 30)	44	(Bangladesh) ACME Chattogram
13	DF	Rezaul Karim Babu	24 November 1997 (age 28)	?	(Bangladesh) ACME Chattogram
21	DF	Shohanur Sobuj	2 October 2000 (age 26)	46	(Bangladesh) Rupayan Group Cumilla
6	MF	Roman Sarkar	1 January 1998 (age 28)	62	(Bangladesh) Metro Express Barishal
7	MF	Naim Uddin	22 April 1999 (age 27)	25	(Bangladesh) Abahani Limited Dhaka
8	MF	Fazla Rabby (Vice-Captain)	6 April 1999 (age 27)	18	(Bangladesh) Metro Express Barishal
9	MF	Al Nahian Shuvo	—	6	(Bangladesh) Monarch Mart Padma
15	MF	Amirul Islam	—	7	(Bangladesh) Mohammedan SC
17	MF	Huzaifa Hossain	—	20	(Bangladesh) Walton Dhaka
20	MF	Abed Uddin	—	21	(Bangladesh) Walton Dhaka
10	FW	Puskar Khisa (Captain)	30 June 1993 (age 33)	83	(Bangladesh) Rupayan Group Cumilla
11	FW	Rakibul Hasan	2 September 2004 (age 22)	1	(Bangladesh) Monarch Mart Padma
14	FW	Mahbub Hossain	22 April 1999 (age 27)	9	(Bangladesh) Metro Express Barishal
16	FW	Obaidul Hossain Joy	14 September 2002 (age 24)	5	(Bangladesh) Rupayan Group Cumilla
19	FW	Arshad Hossain	1 July 2001 (age 25)	46	(Bangladesh) ACME Chattogram

== Coaching staff ==
Position	Name
Head coach	(Bangladesh) Mamun Ur Rashid
Assistant coaches	(Bangladesh) Moshiur Rahman Biplob
Trainer	(Bangladesh) Alamgir Islam
Manager	(Bangladesh) Syed Bayazid Haider
Assistant manager	(Bangladesh) Kazi Abu Zafar Tapan
Team physio	(Bangladesh) Saifuddin Ahmed
Video analyst	(Bangladesh) Taposh Barman

== Competitive record ==
=== World Cup ===
World Cup Record
Year	Round	Position	GP	W	D	L	GF	GA
(Spain) 1971	Part of Pakistan							
(Netherlands) 1973	Did not qualify							
(Malaysia) 1975	Did not qualify							
(Argentina) 1978	Did not qualify							
(India) 1982	Did not qualify							
(England) 1986	Did not qualify							
(Pakistan) 1990	Did not qualify							
(Australia) 1994	Did not qualify							
(Netherlands) 1998	Did not qualify							
(Malaysia) 2002	Did not qualify							
(Germany) 2006	Did not qualify							
(India) 2010	Did not qualify							
(Netherlands) 2014	Did not qualify							
(India) 2018	Did not qualify							
(India) 2023	Did not qualify							
(Belgium) (Netherlands) 2026	Did not qualify							
Total	0/15	0 Titles	0	0	0	0	0	0

==== World Cup Qualifiers ====
World Cup Qualifiers
Year	Round	Position	GP	W	D	L	GF	GA
(Scotland) 2001	DNQ	16th place	8	0	0	0	6	37
Total	1/1	0 Title	8	0	0	8	6	37

=== Asian Games ===
Asian Games
Year	Round	Position	GP	W	D	L	GF	GA
(Japan) 1958 to (Thailand) 1970	Part of Pakistan							
(Iran) 1974	Did not participate							
(Thailand) 1978	Preliminary Round	6th place	3	1	0	2	2	24
(India) 1982	Preliminary Round	9th place	4	1	0	3	4	23
(South Korea) 1986	Preliminary Round	7th place	3	1	0	2	3	11
(China) 1990	Did not participate							
(Japan) 1994	Preliminary Round	7th place	4	1	0	3	2	13
(Thailand) 1998	Preliminary Round	9th place	5	1	1	3	4	27
(South Korea) 2002	Preliminary Round	7th place	5	1	0	4	7	26
(Qatar) 2006	Preliminary Round	7th place	6	2	0	4	13	29
(China) 2010	Preliminary Round	8th place	6	1	0	5	5	24
(South Korea) 2014	Preliminary Round	8th place	5	1	0	4	5	24
(Indonesia) 2018	Preliminary Round	6th place	6	3	0	3	11	22
(China) 2022	Preliminary Round	8th place	6	2	0	4	18	33
(Japan) 2026	Preliminary Round	7th place	7	3	0	4	13	30
Total	12/12	0 Titles	60	17	2	41	87	286

=== Asian Games Qualifiers ===
Asian Games Qualifiers
Year	Round	Position	GP	W	D	L	GF	GA
(Bangladesh) 2006	Qualified; Champion	1/7	6	5	1	0	14	5
(Bangladesh) 2010	Qualified; 5th place	5/7	6	2	2	2	22	15
(Bangladesh) 2014	Qualified; Champion	1/8	5	4	1	0	18	5
(Oman) 2018	Qualified; Runners-up	2/8	5	4	0	1	38	5
(Thailand) 2022	Qualified; Runners-up	2/9	5	4	0	1	13	9
(Thailand) 2026	Qualified; 5th place	5/9	5	2	2	1	14	13
Total	6/6	2 Titles	32	21	6	5	119	52

=== Asia Cup ===
Asia Cup
Year	Round	Position	GP	W	D	L	GF	GA
(Pakistan) 1982	Preliminary Round	5th place	6	2	0	4	8	22
(Bangladesh) 1985	Group stage	6th place	4	1	2	1	6	5
(India) 1989	Group stage	7th place	3	0	0	3	1	19
(Japan) 1994	Group stage	6th place	4	1	1	2	4	8
(Malaysia) 1999	Group stage	6th place	4	1	1	2	2	8
(Malaysia) 2003	Group stage	8th place	3	0	0	3	0	26
(India) 2007	Group stage	7th place	5	2	0	3	16	22
(Malaysia) 2009	Group stage	7th place	3	0	0	3	1	21
(Malaysia) 2013	Group stage	7th place	3	0	0	3	3	22
(Bangladesh) 2017	Group stage	6th place	3	0	0	3	1	17
(Indonesia) 2022	Group stage	6th place	3	1	0	2	4	15
(India) 2025	Group stage	6th place	5	2	0	3	16	19
Total	11/11	0 Titles	41	8	4	29	46	185

=== Asian Champions Trophy ===
Asian Champions Trophy
Year	Round	Position	GP	W	D	L	GF	GA
(India) 2011	Did not participate							
(Qatar) 2012	Did not participate							
(Japan) 2013	Did not participate							
(Malaysia) 2016	Did not participate							
(Oman) 2018	Did not participate							
(Bangladesh) 2021	Preliminary Round	5th-place	4	0	0	4	4	23
(India) 2023	Did not participate							
(China) 2024	Did not participate							
(India) 2026	Preliminary Round	6th-place	6	0	1	5	3	29
Total	1/8	0 Titles	10	0	1	9	7	52

=== Hockey World League ===
Hockey World League
Year	Round	Position	GP	W	D	L	GF	GA
(India) 2012–13	Second Round	19th place	5	3	0	2	18	17
(Singapore) 2014–15	Second Round	28th place	6	2	0	4	14	17
(Bangladesh) 2016–17	Second Round	27th place	6	3	0	3	20	15
Total	3/3	0 Titles	17	8	0	9	52	49

=== AHF Cup ===
AHF Cup
Year	Round	Position	GP	W	D	L	GF	GA
(Singapore) 2008	Champion	1st	5	4	1	0	26	9
(Thailand) 2012	Champion	1st	5	5	0	0	28	9
(Hong Kong) 2016	Champion	1st	3	3	0	0	28	4
(Indonesia) 2022	Champion	1st	6	6	0	0	32	8
(Indonesia) 2025	Third place	3rd	6	5	0	1	21	9
Total	5/7	4 Titles	25	23	1	1	128	39

=== South Asian Games ===
South Asian Games
No	Year	Host	Position
1	1995	Madras, India	3rd
2	2006	Colombo, Sri Lanka	4th
3	2010	Dhaka, Bangladesh	3rd
4	2016	Guwahati, India	3rd
5	2027	Lahore, Pakistan	TBD

== International grounds ==
Locations of stadiums which have hosted international field hockey matches in Bangladesh

Stadium	City	Division	Capacity	Matches hosted	Notes
Maulana Bhasani Hockey Stadium	Dhaka	Dhaka Division	10,000	International & domestic matches, AHF Cup	National hockey stadium; venue for Asian Games qualifiers, World League, and FIH events
Shaheed Smriti Stadium	Rajshahi	Rajshahi Division	5,000	National championships	Multi-sport venue; occasionally used for domestic and junior-level hockey tournaments

== Results and fixtures ==
=== 2025 ===
==== 2025 AHF Cup ====
18 April 2025 2025 Men's AHF Cup Pool B	Bangladesh	4–1	Kazakhstan	Jakarta, Indonesia
18:00 BST (UTC+6)	Islam 24'; Uddin 38'; Hasan 39'; Sobuj 44'	Report	Duisengazy 30'	Stadium: Gelora Bung Karno Sports Complex

20 April 2025 2025 Men's AHF Cup Pool B	Indonesia	2–3	Bangladesh	Jakarta, Indonesia
18:00 BST (UTC+6)	Prastyo 30'; Akmal 34'	Report	Joy 25'; Sobuj 28'; Rabby 60'	Stadium: Gelora Bung Karno Sports Complex

22 April 2025 2025 Men's AHF Cup Pool B	Bangladesh	2–1	Thailand	Jakarta, Indonesia
16:00 BST (UTC+6)	Islam 23'; Arshad 34'	Report	Thawichat 29'	Stadium: Gelora Bung Karno Sports Complex

23 April 2025 2025 Men's AHF Cup Pool B	Sri Lanka	0–5	Bangladesh	Jakarta, Indonesia
16:00 BST (UTC+6)		Report	Hasan 39', 42'; Rabby 43'; Arshad 49'; Uddin 50'	Stadium: Gelora Bung Karno Sports Complex

25 April 2025 2025 Men's AHF Cup Semi-finals	Bangladesh	4–5	Oman	Jakarta, Indonesia
18:00 BST (UTC+6)	Sobuj 13', 54'; Islam 24'; Joy 38'	Report	Al-Noufali 8', 31'; Al-Fazari 27', 44'; Al-Lawati 30'	Stadium: Gelora Bung Karno Sports Complex

Third and fourth place

27 April 2025 2025 Men's AHF Cup	Kazakhstan	0–3	Bangladesh	Jakarta, Indonesia
13:30 BST (UTC+6)		Report	Hossain 3'; Islam 37'; Hasan 47'	Stadium: Gelora Bung Karno Sports Complex

==== 2025 Asia Cup ====
29 August 2025 2025 Men's Hockey Asia Cup Pool B	Malaysia	4–1	Bangladesh	Bihar, India
09:30 BST (UTC+6)	Hamsani 25'; Anuar 36'; Abdu Rauf 48'; Cholan 54'	Report	Islam 16'	Stadium: Rajgir Sports Complex

30 August 2025 2025 Men's Hockey Asia Cup Pool B	Bangladesh	8–3	Chinese Taipei	Bihar, India
13:30 BST (UTC+6)	Abdullah 4', 26'; Sobuj 36'; Hasan 42', 42'; Islam 45', 58'; Babu 56'	Report	Hsieh 10', 18'; Shih 60'	Stadium: Rajgir Sports Complex

1 September 2025 2025 Men's Hockey Asia Cup Pool B	Bangladesh	1–5	South Korea	Bihar, India
14:00 BST (UTC+6)	Sobuj 22'	Report	Son 9', 11'; Lee S-w 16'; Oh 22'; Yang 60+'	Stadium: Rajgir Sports Complex

5–8th place Semi-finals

4 September 2025 2025 Men's Hockey Asia Cup 5–8th SF	Bangladesh	5–1	Kazakhstan	Bihar, India
15:00 BST (UTC+6)	Islam 10', 23'; Sarkar 28', 33'; Ali 34'	Report	Aitkaliyev 38'	Stadium: Rajgir Sports Complex

Fifth and sixth place

7 September 2025 2025 Men's Hockey Asia Cup 5th/6th PO	Japan	6–1	Bangladesh	Bihar, India
15:00 BST (UTC+6)	Yamasaki 9'; Shinohara 15', 36', 56'; Nagayoshi 36'; Tanaka 50'	Report	Islam 55'	Stadium: Rajgir Sports Complex

==== 2025 Asia Play-offs ====
13 November 2025 2025 Asia Play-offs	Bangladesh	2–8	Pakistan	Dhaka, Bangladesh
16:00 BST (UTC+6)	Hossain 15'; Islam 58'	Report	Butt 4'; Nadeem 19', 56'; Afraz 24', 30'; Ali 32'; Rana 44'; Shahid 47'	Stadium: Maulana Bhasani Hockey Stadium

14 November 2025 2025 Asia Play-offs	Bangladesh	0–8	Pakistan	Dhaka, Bangladesh
17:00 BST (UTC+6)		Report	Sufyan 6', 19'; Rana 13', 57'; Rana 30+'; Shahid 32'; Afraz 53'; Butt 19'	Stadium: Maulana Bhasani Hockey Stadium

16 November 2025 2025 Asia Play-offs	Bangladesh	3–10	Pakistan	Dhaka, Bangladesh
16:00 BST (UTC+6)	Abdullah 19'; Hasan 44'; Islam 57'	Report	Sufyan 8', 10', 16', 29', 34', 57'; Rehman 15', 59'; Nadeem 40'; Rana 52'	Stadium: Maulana Bhasani Hockey Stadium

=== 2026 ===
==== 2026 Asian Games Qualifier ====
2 April 2026 Pool B	Bangladesh	4–3	Chinese Taipei	Bangkok, Thailand
09:00 BST (UTC+6)	As. Islam 15', 22'; Am. Islam 34'; Emon 59'	Report	Li 4', 59'; Hsieh 60'	Stadium: Royal Thai Air Force Hockey Stadium

3 April 2026 Pool B	Sri Lanka	3–2	Bangladesh	Bangkok, Thailand
11:00 BST (UTC+6)	Bothale 6'; Weerappuli 16'; Rathnayake 49'	Report	As. Islam 13'; Am. Islam 49'	Stadium: Royal Thai Air Force Hockey Stadium

6 April 2026 Pool B	Bangladesh	1–1	Uzbekistan	Bangkok, Thailand
09:00 BST (UTC+6)	Am. Islam 46'	Report	Salimjonov 6'	Stadium: Royal Thai Air Force Hockey Stadium

9 April 2026 5/8th SF	Bangladesh	4–4 (3–2 p)	Hong Kong	Bangkok, Thailand
10:30 BST (UTC+6)	Hasan 3'; Am. Islam 5'; As. Islam 41', 47'	Report	Au 5'; Ahmed 31'; Kuldeep 46'; Iu 48'	Stadium: Royal Thai Air Force Hockey Stadium
	Penalties
	Hasan (penalty shoot-out missed); Joy (penalty shoot-out scored); Roman (penalty shoot-out scored); Uddin (penalty shoot-out missed); F. Rabby (penalty shoot-out scored)		(penalty shoot-out scored) Kuldeep; (penalty shoot-out missed) Ahmed; (penalty shoot-out missed) Ali; (penalty shoot-out missed) Udhampreet; (penalty shoot-out scored) Iu

10 April 2026 5/6th PO	Chinese Taipei	2–3	Bangladesh	Bangkok, Thailand
10:30 BST (UTC+6)	Wei 11'; Lo 34'	Report	As. Islam 7', 17'; Samin 38'	Stadium: Royal Thai Air Force Hockey Stadium

==== 2026 Asian Games ====
18 September 2026 Pool A	South Korea	5–0	Bangladesh	Kakamigahara, Japan
11:00	Bae 21'; Oh 21'; Lee 30'; Yang 32'; Sim 58'	Report		Stadium: Gifu Prefectural Green Stadium

22 September 2026 Pool A	Japan	6–1	Bangladesh	Kakamigahara, Japan
17:00	Kawabe 1', 58'; Yamasaki 6'; Kimura 15'; Watanabe 29'; Matsumoto 41'	Report	Rakin 44'	Stadium: Gifu Prefectural Green Stadium

24 September 2026 Pool A	Bangladesh	5–1	Sri Lanka	Kakamigahara, Japan
11:00	Am. Islam 8', 27'; As. Islam 16', 54'; Hossain 43'	Report	Weerappuli 18'	Stadium: Gifu Prefectural Green Stadium

26 September 2026 Pool A	Bangladesh	3–1	Indonesia	Kakamigahara, Japan
11:00	Am. Islam 11', 31'; Mahmud 37'	Report	Al Ardh 48'	Stadium: Gifu Prefectural Green Stadium

28 September 2026 Pool A	India	10–0	Bangladesh	Kakamigahara, Japan
19:00	Abhishek 3'; Jugraj 22'; Harmanpreet 27', 40', 45'; Sukhjeet 32'; Lakra 44', 45'; Sanjay 59'; Mandeep 60'	Report		Stadium: Gifu Prefectural Green Stadium

1 October 2026 5/8 Classification	China	7–1	Bangladesh	Kakamigahara, Japan
14:00	Zhang 2', 44'; Yulai 4'; Chen 24', 56', 59'; Gao 32'	Report	Hasan 30'	Stadium: Gifu Prefectural Green Stadium

3 October 2026 7th place match	Thailand	0–3	Bangladesh	Kakamigahara, Japan
11:30		Report	Sarkar 3'; Am. Islam 27'; As. Islam 53'	Stadium: Gifu Prefectural Green Stadium

==== 2026 Asian Champions Trophy ====
27 October 2026 Group Stage	India	13–0	Bangladesh	Jalandhar, India
19:00	Harmanpreet 2', 44'; Mandeep 3', 10', 54'; Lakra 15'; Abhishek 18'; Nilakanta 26'; Dilpreet 43', 44'; Jugraj 46'; Hardik 60', 60'	Report		Stadium: Surjit Hockey Stadium

29 October 2026 Group Stage	Bangladesh	0–1	Japan	Jalandhar, India
16:45		Report	Fujishima 40'	Stadium: Surjit Hockey Stadium

30 October 2026 Group Stage	Bangladesh	1–6	Malaysia	Jalandhar, India
14:30	Amirul 26'	Report	Azrai 14', 22'; Anuar 29'; Kamaruddin 32'; Silverius 33'; Rozemi 50'	Stadium: Surjit Hockey Stadium

1 November 2026 Group Stage	South Korea	5–0	Bangladesh	Jalandhar, India
14:30	Park 7', 34'; Son 17', 32', 51'	Report		Stadium: Surjit Hockey Stadium

2 November 2026 Group Stage	China	1–1	Bangladesh	Jalandhar, India
14:30	Chen. B 2'	Report	Ashraful 38'	Stadium: Surjit Hockey Stadium

4 November 2026 5th place match	China	3–1	Bangladesh	Mohali, India
14:00	Zhao 10'; Wang 18'; Chen. C 22'	Report	Rahman 48'	Stadium: Olympian Balbir Singh Senior International Hockey Stadium

== Head-to-head record ==
As of 4 November 2026

Against	Region	P	W	D	L	GF	GA	GD	%Win
Afghanistan	AHF	1	1	0	0	25	0	+25	100.00
Argentina	PAHF	1	0	0	1	1	8	−7	0.00
Belgium	EHF	1	0	0	1	0	5	−5	0.00
Brunei	AHF	1	1	0	0	6	1	+5	100.00
China	AHF	17	2	4	11	19	57	−38	11.76
Chinese Taipei	AHF	10	9	0	1	50	27	+23	90.00
Egypt	AfHF	2	0	0	2	2	7	−5	0.00
Fiji	OHF	2	2	0	0	13	5	+8	100.00
France	EHF	1	0	0	1	2	5	−3	0.00
Ghana	AfHF	1	0	1	0	3	3	+0	0.00
Hong Kong	AHF	17	12	2	3	62	30	+32	70.59
India	AHF	22	0	1	21	7	161	−154	0.00
Indonesia	AHF	5	5	0	0	20	8	+12	100.00
Iran	AHF	4	4	0	0	17	7	+10	100.00
Ireland	EHF	1	0	0	1	2	5	−3	0.00
Japan	AHF	17	0	1	16	12	73	−61	0.00
Kazakhstan	AHF	8	6	0	2	30	16	+14	75.00
Macau	AHF	1	1	0	0	13	0	+13	100.00
Malaysia	AHF	15	0	0	15	9	76	−67	0.00
Mexico	PAHF	1	1	0	0	6	1	+5	100.00
Nepal	AHF	2	2	0	0	34	1	+33	100.00
Oman	AHF	22	10	3	9	63	55	+8	45.45
Pakistan	AHF	21	0	0	21	14	146	−132	0.00
Poland	EHF	1	0	0	1	0	5	−5	0.00
Russia	EHF	2	0	0	2	2	9	−7	0.00
Scotland	EHF	1	0	0	1	0	7	−7	0.00
Singapore	AHF	14	11	2	1	44	12	+32	78.57
South Korea	AHF	16	0	1	15	6	105	−99	0.00
Sri Lanka	AHF	24	19	3	2	76	27	+49	79.17
Thailand	AHF	12	11	1	0	64	8	+56	91.67
Ukraine	EHF	1	0	0	1	1	3	−2	0.00
Uzbekistan	AHF	3	2	1	0	13	6	+7	66.67
Wales	EHF	1	0	0	1	0	1	−1	0.00
Total	33 Nations	248	99	20	129	616	880	-264	39.92

== See also ==
- Bangladesh women's national field hockey team
- Bangladesh men's national under-21 field hockey team
- Bangladesh women's national under-21 field hockey team
