= Singapore men's national field hockey team =

Singapore
- Association: Singapore Hockey Federation
- Confederation: ASHF (Asia)
- Head Coach: Krishnan Vijayan
- Captain: Jaspal Singh Grewal
Home	Away

FIH ranking
- Current: 54 (31 August 2026)

Olympic Games
- Appearances: 1 (first in 1956)
- Best result: 8th (1956)

Asian Games
- Appearances: 6 (first in 1962)
- Best result: 5th (1962, 1970)

Asia Cup
- Appearances: 3 (first in 1982)
- Best result: 6th (1982)

The Singapore men's national field hockey team represents Singapore in men's international field hockey competitions.

== History ==
Singapore has competed only once in the Olympics, in field hockey at the 1956 Summer Olympics in Melbourne, Australia. Placed in a group with India, Afghanistan, and United States, Singapore won 6-1 against USA, 5-0 against Afghanistan, before losing 6-0 to eventual gold medalists India in their final game. They were runners-up in their first group, but in the classification round did not win any games, losing by big margins to Belgium, Australia, and New Zealand to finish eighth overall out of twelve teams.

Singapore has also competed in the Asian Games (with little success) and in the Southeast Asian Games (several silver medals, generally only beaten by Malaysia).

The national team trained at the hockey pitch at Delta Sports Complex from 1991 to 2010, when they moved to Sengkang.

== Tournament record ==
=== Summer Olympics ===
- 1956 – 8th place

=== Asian Games ===
- 1962 – 5th place
- 1970 – 5th place
- 1998 – 7th place
- 2010 – 10th place
- 2014 – 9th place
- 2022 – 12th place

=== Asia Cup ===
- 1982 – 6th place
- 1985 – 9th place
- 2007 – 10th place

=== AHF Cup ===
AHF Cup record
Year	Host	Position
1997	Hong Kong	4th
2002	Hong Kong	4th
2008	Singapore	3rd
2012	Bangkok, Thailand	6th
2016	Hong Kong	4th
2022	Jakarta, Indonesia	9th
2025	Jakarta, Indonesia	10th
Highest finish		3rd place

=== Hockey World League ===
- 2012–13 – Round 1
- 2014–15 – 32nd place
- 2016–17 – Round 1

=== FIH Hockey Series ===
- 2018–19 – Second round

== Results and fixtures ==
The following is a list of match results in the last 12 months, as well as any future matches that have been scheduled.

Win Draw Loss Fixture

=== 2026 ===
24 January Test 1	Brunei	0–6	Singapore	Bandar Seri Begawan, Brunei
16:15		Report	Naidu 13'; Peh 33'; Goh 41'; Yap 52'; Ahilan 54'; Tan 55'	Stadium: National Hockey Stadium

25 January Test 2	Brunei	0–5	Singapore	Bandar Seri Begawan, Brunei
16:15		Report	Ahilan 37', 41'; Loo 43'; Peh 58'; Poh 60'	Stadium: National Hockey Stadium

1 May 4 Nations Invitational Tournament	Singapore	9–0	Cambodia	Singapore
18:00	Sia 6', 19'; Jasni 11'; Yap 17', 25', 52'; H. Naidu 35'; Basir 44'; D. Naidu 55'	Report		Stadium: Sengkang Sports Centre

2 May 4 Nations Invitational Tournament	Singapore	11–0	Vietnam	Singapore
18:00	D. Naidu 11', 49', 50'; Sia 20', 45'; Teng 27'; Yap 35'; Peh 36'; H. Naidu 41'; Ahilan 55'; Ong 57'	Report		Stadium: Sengkang Sports Centre

3 May 4 Nations Invitational Tournament	Brunei	0–8	Singapore	Singapore
18:00		Report	Yap 3', 21'; Ahilan 7', 10'; Basir 37'; D. Naidu 38'; Goh 48'; H. Naidu 48'	Stadium: Sengkang Sports Centre

5 September Test 1	Macau	0–9	Singapore	Taipa, Macau
09:00		Report	Yap 16', 30', 32', 47'; Basir 20'; Sia 29'; Peh 36'; Teng 45', 54'	Stadium: Macau Stadium

6 September Test 2	Macau	0–7	Singapore	Taipa, Macau
15:00		Report	Sia 3', 48'; Yap 22', 49', 55'; Gn 37'; Basir 60'	Stadium: Macau Stadium

== See also ==
- Singapore women's national field hockey team
