= Khorshadur Rahman =

Bangladeshi field hockey player

Personal information
- Full name: Khorshadur Rahman
- Born: Bangladesh

Sport
- Sport: Field hockey
Senior career
Years	Team	Caps	Goals
2022	Saif Power Group Khulna	-	-
National team
Years	Team	Caps	Goals
–	Bangladesh Hockey		-

Khorshadur Rahman (Bengali: খোরশেদুর রহমান) is a Bangladeshi field hockey player and an international player in Bangladesh. He is a player of the Bangladesh national field hockey team.
