= 2025 Men's AHF Cup =

Field hockey qualification tournament

Tournament details
- Host country: Indonesia
- City: Jakarta
- Dates: 17–27 April 2025
- Teams: 10 (from 1 confederation)
- Venue(s): GBK Hockey Field

Final positions
- Champions: Oman (1st title)
- Runner-up: Chinese Taipei
- Third place: Bangladesh

Tournament statistics
- Matches played: 29
- Goals scored: 156 (5.38 per match)
- Top scorer(s): (Chinese Taipei) Hsieh Tsung-Yu (16 goals)
- Best player: (Chinese Taipei) Hsieh Tsung-Yu
- Best young player: (Kazakhstan) Agymtay Duisengazy
- Best goalkeeper: (Uzbekistan) Davlat Tolibbaev

The 2025 Men's AHF Cup was the seventh edition of the Men's AHF Cup, a field hockey qualification tournament for the Men's Hockey Asia Cup organized by the Asian Hockey Federation. It was held alongside the women's tournament at the GBK Hockey Field in Jakarta, Indonesia from 17 April to 27 April 2025. This marked the second time Indonesia hosted the tournament.

Oman won their first AHF Cup title by defeating Chinese Taipei 4–3 in the final. Four-time defending champions Bangladesh won the bronze medal as they defeated Kazakhstan 3–0. As finalists Oman, Chinese Taipei and third place team Bangladesh (Note: Pakistan withdraws and is replaced by Bangladesh.) secured qualification for the 2025 Men's Asia Cup in Rajgir, India.

Pakistan withdrew citing security concerns and financial constraints, and was replaced by Bangladesh. Oman also pulled out due to financial issues and was replaced by Kazakhstan.

== Teams ==
- Bangladesh
- Hong Kong
- Indonesia
- Kazakhstan
- Oman
- Singapore
- Sri Lanka
- Thailand
- Chinese Taipei
- Uzbekistan

== Preliminary round ==
All times are local (UTC+7).

=== Pool A ===
Pos	Team	Pld	W	D	L	GF	GA	GD	Pts	Qualification
1	Chinese Taipei	4	3	1	0	19	7	+12	10	Semi-finals
2	Oman	4	3	1	0	14	8	+6	10	Semi-finals
3	Hong Kong	4	1	1	2	6	9	−3	4	
4	Uzbekistan	4	1	1	2	9	14	−5	4	
5	Singapore	4	0	0	4	3	13	−10	0	

Source: FIH
Rules for classification: 1) points; 2) matches won; 3) goal difference; 4) goals for; 5) head-to-head result; 6) field goals for.

17 April 2025
13:00

Chinese Taipei	5–0	Singapore
Li C. 19'; Hsieh 24', 35', 44'; Wei C. 53'	Report

Umpires:
Anand Dangi (IND)
Akalanka Ishan Kumara (SRI)

17 April 2025
19:00

Hong Kong	2–2	Uzbekistan
Iu 41'; Kuldeep-Singh 42'	Report	Khaytboev 29'; Khudoynazarov 35'

Umpires:
Yaser Khurshid (PAK)
Respati Feraro Rusaidi (INA)

18 April 2025
17:00

Oman	3–1	Singapore
Al-Lawati 6', 15', 35'	Report	Thulasiram 41'

Umpires:
Ismail Hossain Liton (BAN)
Adilzhan Kudaibergen (KAZ)

19 April 2025
13:00

Chinese Taipei	6–2	Uzbekistan
Wei C. 34', 42'; Li Y. 37', 52'; Tsai 46'; Hsieh 50'	Report	Khaytboev 4'; Sotlikov 17'

Umpires:
Yaser Khurshid (PAK)
Phiraphat Niensupornphand (THA)

20 April 2025
15:00

Hong Kong	1–3	Oman
Ahmed 52'	Report	Al-Fazari 35'; M. Al-Noufali 48'; Madit 54'

Umpires:
Respati Feraro Rusaidi (INA)
Phiraphat Niensupornphand (THA)

20 April 2025
17:00

Uzbekistan	3–2	Singapore
Oblokulov 17'; Khakimov 44', 53'	Report	Loo 31'; Peh 51'

Umpires:
Arifin (INA)
Ismail Hossain Liton (BAN)

21 April 2025
15:00

Hong Kong	1–4	Chinese Taipei
Ahmed 54'	Report	Hsieh 23', 57'; Wei C. 33'; Li C. 41'

Umpires:
Anand Dangi (IND)
Akalanka Ishan Kumara (SRI)

22 April 2025
19:00

Oman	4–2	Uzbekistan
Barazahan 15'; Al-Shatari 15'; Al-Fazari 34', 51'	Report	Khaytboev 5', 38'

Umpires:
Yaser Khurshid (PAK)
Anand Dangi (IND)

23 April 2025
13:00

Singapore	0–2	Hong Kong
	Report	Monthong 41'; Tsang 46'

Umpires:
Ismail Hossain Liton (BAN)
Arifin (INA)

23 April 2025
19:00

Chinese Taipei	4–4	Oman
Hsieh 1', 10', 37', 50'	Report	Al-Fazari 15'; Al-Lawati 17'; Ammaar 26'; Talal 37'

Umpires:
Kyle Teo (SGP)
Akalanka Ishan Kumara (SRI)

=== Pool B ===
Pos	Team	Pld	W	D	L	GF	GA	GD	Pts	Qualification
1	Bangladesh	4	4	0	0	14	4	+10	12	Semi-finals
2	Kazakhstan	4	2	1	1	7	8	−1	7	Semi-finals
3	Thailand	4	1	2	1	5	5	0	5	
4	Sri Lanka	4	1	1	2	5	10	−5	4	
5	Indonesia (H)	4	0	0	4	5	9	−4	0	

Source: FIH
Rules for classification: 1) points; 2) matches won; 3) goal difference; 4) goals for; 5) head-to-head result; 6) field goals for.
(H) Hosts

17 April 2025
15:00

Indonesia	1–2	Thailand
Asasi 51'	Report	Thawichat 18'; Chueamkaew 53'

Umpires:
Ravdeep Sethi (HKG)
Abdulaziz ABDULKHAKIMOV (UZB)

17 April 2025
17:00

Sri Lanka	2–3	Kazakhstan
Ranasingha 19'; Sudusinghe 48'	Report	Duisengazy 11', 45'; Zhokenbayev 40'

Umpires:
Hussain Al Hasani (OMA)
Kyle Teo (SGP)

18 April 2025
19:00

Bangladesh	4–1	Kazakhstan
Islam 24'; Uddin 38'; Hasan 39'; Sobuj 44'	Report	Duisengazy 30'

Umpires:
Ravdeep Sethi (HKG)
Arifin (INA)

19 April 2025
17:00

Sri Lanka	1–1	Thailand
Rathnayake 56'	Report	Phumee 33'

Umpires:
Hussain Al Hasani (OMA)
Anand Dangi (IND)

20 April 2025
19:00

Indonesia	2–3	Bangladesh
Prastyo 30'; Akmal 34'	Report	Joy 25'; Sobuj 28'; Rabby 60'

Umpires:
Kyle Teo (SGP)
Ravdeep Sethi (HKG)

21 April 2025
15:00

Thailand	1–1	Kazakhstan
Thawichat 49'	Report	Duisengazy 30'

Umpires:
Hussain Al Hasani (OMA)
Abdulaziz Abdulkhakimov (UZB)

21 April 2025
19:00

Indonesia	1–2	Sri Lanka
Prastyo 5'	Report	Batuvita 27'; Karunamunige 53'

Umpires:
Yaser Khurshid (PAK)
Kyle Teo (SGP)

22 April 2025
17:00

Bangladesh	2–1	Thailand
Islam 23'; Arshad 34'	Report	Thawichat 29'

Umpires:
Ravdeep Sethi (HKG)
Hussain Al Hasani (OMA)

23 April 2025
15:00

Kazakhstan	2–1	Indonesia
Dyussebekov 12'; Duisengazy 56'	Report	Wibowo 43'

Umpires:
Anand Dangi (IND)
Abdulaziz Abdulkhakimov (UZB)

23 April 2025
17:00

Sri Lanka	0–5	Bangladesh
	Report	Hasan 39', 42'; Rabby 43'; Arshad 49'; Uddin 50'

Umpires:
Ravdeep Sethi (HKG)
Respati Feraro Rusaidi (INA)

== Classification round ==
=== Ninth to tenth place ===
26 April 2025
10:00

Singapore	3–5	Indonesia
Thulasiram 13'; Yap 47'; Loh 58'	Report	Asasi 16'; Al Akbar 20'; Suharyana 28'; Fathur 48'; Wibowo 52'

Umpires:
Ismail Hossain Liton (BAN)
Phiraphat Niensupornphand (THA)

== Fifth to eighth place classification ==
=== Bracket ===
Cross-overs
25 April
Hong Kong	5
Sri Lanka	4
25 April
Thailand	2
Uzbekistan	5

Fifth place
26 April
Hong Kong	4
Uzbekistan	3
Seventh place
26 April
Sri Lanka	6
Thailand	4

=== Cross-overs ===
25 April 2025
12:15

Hong Kong	5–4	Sri Lanka
Tsang 8'; Ali 25'; Iu 27'; Cheung 37'; Ho 49'	Report	Ranasingha 6', 36'; Rathnayake 14', 18'

Umpires:
Phiraphat Niensupornphand (THA)
Kyle Teo(SGP)

25 April 2025
14:30

Thailand	2–5	Uzbekistan
Thawichat 6'; Rungniyom 38'	Report	Husanov 8', 48'; Mamajonov 41'; Oblokulov 45'; Khakimov 51'

Umpires:
Akalanka Ishan Kumara (SRI)
Ismail Hossain Liton (BAN)

=== Seventh and eighth place ===
26 April 2025
16:45

Sri Lanka	6–4	Thailand
Ranasingha 7', 44'; Rathnayake 23'; Sudusinghe 35'; Weerappuli 55'; Fernando 58'	Report	Chaimanee 14'; Chueamkaew 32', 38'; Juntakian 50'

Umpires:
Kyle Teo (SGP)
Arifin (INA)

=== Fifth and sixth place ===
26 April 2025
19:00

Hong Kong	4–3	Uzbekistan
Tsang 18', 59'; Iu 29'; Ho 51'	Report	Khaytboev 5', 43'; Husanov 11'

Umpires:
Akalanka Ishan Kumara (SRI)
Respati Feraro Rusaidi (INA)

== First to fourth place classification ==
=== Bracket ===
Semi-finals
25 April
Chinese Taipei	7
Kazakhstan	1
25 April
Bangladesh	4
Oman	5

Final
27 April
Chinese Taipei	3
Oman	4
Third place
27 April
Kazakhstan	0
Bangladesh	3

=== Semi-finals ===
25 April 2025
16:45

Chinese Taipei	7–1	Kazakhstan
Hsieh 2', 14', 19', 53'; Wei C. 11'; Chang 23'; Shih 52'	Report	Duisengazy 29'

Umpires:
Hussain Al Hasani (OMA)
Ravdeep Sethi (HKG)

25 April 2025
19:00

Bangladesh	4–5	Oman
Sobuj 13', 54'; Islam 24'; Joy 38'	Report	Al-Noufali 8', 31'; Al-Fazari 27', 44'; Al-Lawati 30'

Umpires:
Anand Dangi (IND)
Yaser Khurshid (PAK)

=== Third and fourth place ===
27 April 2025
14:30

Kazakhstan	0–3	Bangladesh
	Report	Hossain 3'; Islam 37'; Hasan 47'

Umpires:
Yaser Khurshid (PAK)
Hussain Al Hasani (OMA)

=== Final ===
27 April 2025
19:00

Chinese Taipei	3–4	Oman
Wei C. 4'; Hsieh 29'; Huang 43'	Report	Al-Fazari 12'; Al-Shatari 22'; Al-Noufali 27'; Madit 45'

Umpires:
Anand Dangi (IND)
Ravdeep Sethi (HKG)

== Statistics ==
=== Final standings ===
Pos	Team	Qualification
1st place, gold medalist(s)	Oman	
2nd place, silver medalist(s)	Chinese Taipei	2025 Asia Cup
3rd place, bronze medalist(s)	Bangladesh	2025 Asia Cup
4	Kazakhstan	2025 Asia Cup
5	Hong Kong	
6	Uzbekistan	
7	Sri Lanka	
8	Thailand	
9	Indonesia (H)	
10	Singapore	

Source: FIH
(H) Host

=== Goalscorers ===
There were 156 goals scored in 29 matches, for an average of 5.38 goals per match.

16 goals

- (Chinese Taipei) Hsieh Tsung-Yu

7 goals

- (Oman) Rashad Al-Fazari

6 goals

- (Kazakhstan) Agymtay Duisengazy
- (Uzbekistan) Gaybullo Khaytboev

5 goals

- (Bangladesh) Ashraful Islam
- (Chinese Taipei) Wei Cheng-Ze
- (Oman) Fahad Al-Lawati
- (Sri Lanka) Daammika Ranasingha

4 goals

- (Bangladesh) Rakibul Hasan
- (Bangladesh) Shohanur Sobuj
- (Hong Kong) Kin Kan Tsang
- (Sri Lanka) Suresh Rathnayake
- (Thailand) Kritsada Chueamkaew

3 goals

- (Bangladesh) Arshad Hossain
- (Hong Kong) Felix Iu
- (Oman) Aliyas Al-Noufali
- (Thailand) Kraiwich Thawichat
- (Uzbekistan) Fozilbek Husanov
- (Uzbekistan) Khakimboy Khakimov

2 goals

- (Bangladesh) Obidul Joy
- (Bangladesh) Fazla Rabby
- (Bangladesh) Naim Uddin
- (Chinese Taipei) Li Chi-Hsuan
- (Chinese Taipei) Shih Tsung-Jen
- (Hong Kong) Ishtiaq Ahmed
- (Hong Kong) Ching Ho
- (Indonesia) Ahdan Asasi
- (Indonesia) Alfandy Prastyo
- (Indonesia) Arthur Wibowo
- (Oman) Shafi Al-Shatari
- (Oman) Aiman Madit
- (Singapore) Ramanan Thulasiram
- (Sri Lanka) Sanda Sudusinghe
- (Uzbekistan) Jonibek Oblokulov

1 goal

- (Chinese Taipei) Chang Chun-Yu
- (Chinese Taipei) Huang Lin-Yu
- (Chinese Taipei) Li Yan
- (Chinese Taipei) Tsai Chang-Yu
- (Hong Kong) Farman Ali
- (Hong Kong) Pak Au
- (Hong Kong) Kuldeep-Singh
- (Hong Kong) Windfall Monthong
- (Indonesia) Khaerulloh Akmal
- (Indonesia) Abdullah Al Akbar
- (Indonesia) Mochamad Fathur
- (Indonesia) Suharyana
- (Kazakhstan) Yerkebulan Dyussebekov
- (Kazakhstan) Maxat Zhokenbayev
- (Oman) Ammaar Al-Shaaibi
- (Oman) Mohammed Al-Noufali
- (Oman) Talal Bait
- (Oman) Asama Barazahan
- (Singapore) Darius Loh
- (Singapore) Kent Loo
- (Singapore) An Peh
- (Singapore) Wee Yap
- (Sri Lanka) Sandaruwan Batuvita
- (Sri Lanka) Udayashan Fernando
- (Sri Lanka) Demian Karunamunige
- (Sri Lanka) Kusal Weerappuli
- (Thailand) Pichet Chaimanee
- (Thailand) Tanakit Juntakian
- (Thailand) Kritsana Phumee
- (Thailand) Jiranat Sae-aew
- (Uzbekistan) Bunyodbek Khudoynazarov
- (Uzbekistan) Islombek Mamajonov
- (Uzbekistan) Doston Sotlikov

Source: FIH
