= Rashel Mahmud =

Bangladeshi field hockey player

Personal information
- Full name: Rashel Mahmud Jimmy
- National team: Bangladesh Hockey
- Born: Bangladesh

Rashel Mahmud (Bengali: রাসেল মাহমুদ) is a Bangladeshi field hockey player and is an international player in Bangladesh. He is a player of Bangladesh national field hockey team.
