= Shohanur Sobuj =

Bangladeshi field hockey player

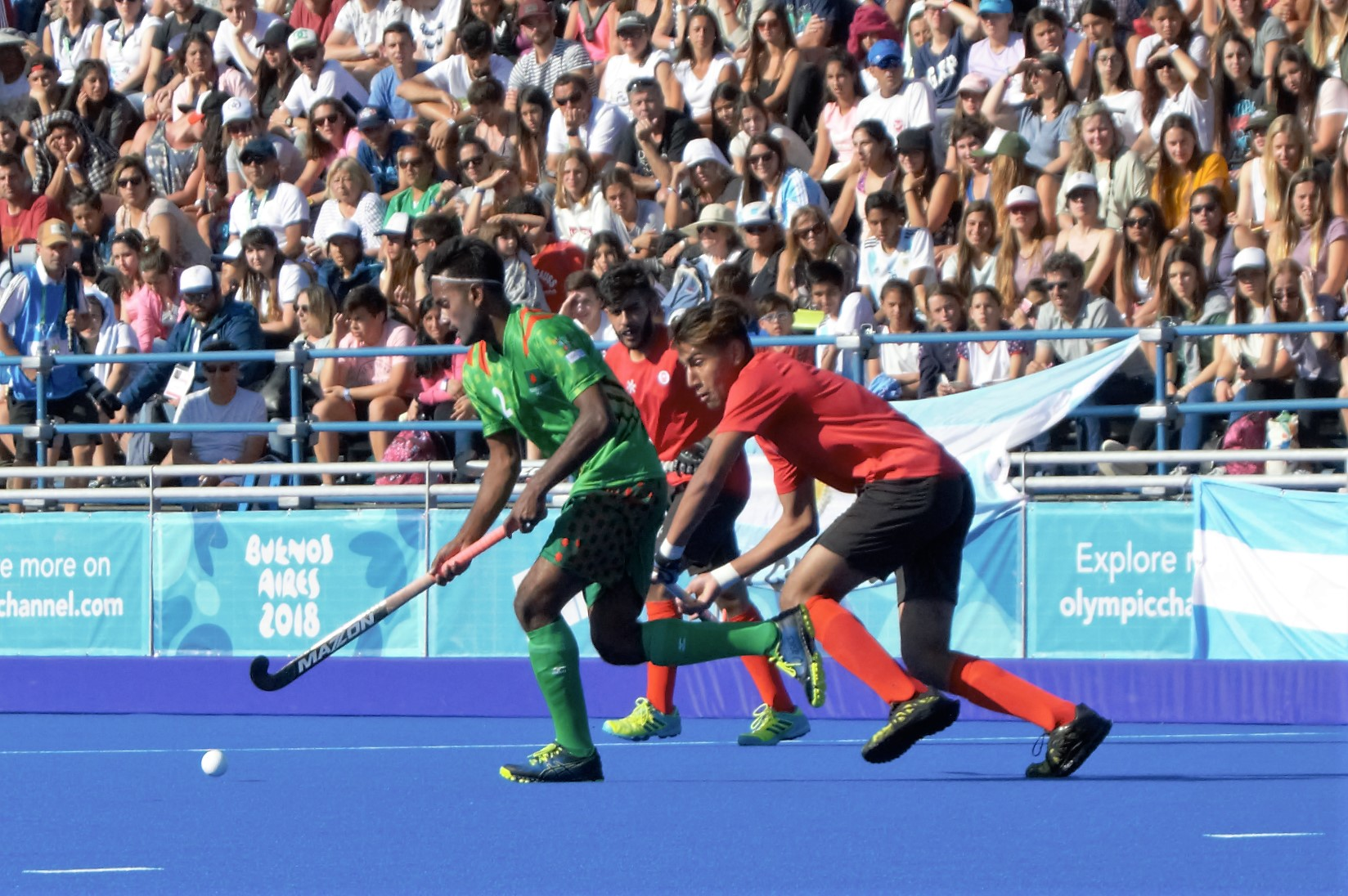

Personal information
- Full name: Shohanur Rahman Sobuj
- Born: 2 October 2000 (age 25) Pabna, Bangladesh

Sport
- Sport: Field hockey
National team
Years	Team	Caps	Goals
2018	Bangladesh U-18	15	(15)
2018-	Bangladesh	35	(9)

Shohanur Rahman Sobuj (Bengali: সবুজ সোহানুর; born 2 October 2000 in Pabna, Bangladesh) known simply as Shohanur Sobuj, is a Bangladeshi field hockey player. He is a member of the Bangladesh national field hockey team.

== Record ==
His total goals in 2024 were 39 which broke all his previous records. And until 2024, the highest goals scored by a player in the history of Bangladesh is 40. Rafiqul Islam Kamal scored 40 goals in 1995.
