= Ashraful Islam (field hockey) =

Bangladeshi field hockey player

Personal information
- Born: 5 January 1999 (age 27) Savar, Bangladesh

Sport
- Sport: Field hockey
- Position: Defender
- Club: Walton Dhaka
Senior career
Years	Team	Caps	Goals
2022–	Walton Dhaka	-	-
National team
Years	Team	Caps	Goals
2014–	Bangladesh	55	-
Medal record
Men's field hockey
Representing Bangladesh
Men's AHF Cup
Gold medal – first place	2016 Hong Kong	Team
Gold medal – first place	2022 Indonesia	Team
Bronze medal – third place	2025 Indonesia	Team
South Asian Games
Bronze medal – third place	2016 Guwahati	Team
Boys' Asia Cup
Silver medal – second place	2016 Dhaka

Ashraful Islam (Bengali: আশরাফুল ইসলাম) is a Bangladeshi field hockey player. He is a member of the Bangladesh national field hockey team.

== Honours ==
=== Bangladesh ===
- Men's AHF Cup: 2016, 2022
- South Asian Games bronze medal: 2016
