= Koji Yamasaki (field hockey) =

Japanese field hockey player (born 1996)

Personal information
- Born: 27 February 1996 (age 30) Hiroshima Prefecture, Japan
- Height: 1.69 m (5 ft 7 in)

Sport
- Sport: Field hockey
- Position: Forward
Senior career
Years	Team	Caps	Goals
2024–present	Delhi SG Pipers	-	-
National team
Years	Team	Caps	Goals
2016–present	Japan	97	(28)
Medal record
Men's field hockey
Representing Japan
Asian Games
Gold medal – first place	2018 Jakarta	Team

Koji Yamasaki (山﨑 晃嗣, Yamasaki Kōji; born 27 February 1996) is a Japanese field hockey player. He competed in the 2020 Summer Olympics.

He was a part of the Japan squad which won their first Asian Games gold medal in men's hockey in 2018.
