= Men's AHF Cup =

Field hockey contest in Asia

- Most recent season or competition: 2025 Men's AHF Cup
- Sport: Field hockey
- Founded: 1997; 29 years ago
- First season: 1997
- No. of teams: 10
- Confederation: AHF (Asia)
- Most recent champion: Oman (1st title) (2025)
- Most titles: Bangladesh (4 titles)

The Men's AHF Cup is a quadrennial international men's field hockey competition in Asia organized by the Asian Hockey Federation. The tournament was founded in 1997 and serves as a qualification tournament for the next Men's Asia Cup.

== Results ==
#	Year	Host	Final			Third place match			Teams
#	Year	Host	Winner	Score	Runner-up	Third place	Score	Fourth place	Teams
1	1997; Details	Hong Kong	Hong Kong	Round-robin	Oman	Sri Lanka	Round-robin	Singapore	7
2	2002; Details	Hong Kong	Hong Kong	Round-robin	Chinese Taipei	Sri Lanka	Round-robin	Singapore	7
3	2008; Details	Singapore	Bangladesh	6–1	Oman	Singapore	?–?	Sri Lanka	9
4	2012; Details	Bangkok, Thailand	Bangladesh	6–3	Oman	Sri Lanka	5–2	Chinese Taipei	9
5	2016; Details	Hong Kong	Bangladesh	3–0	Sri Lanka	Hong Kong	2–1	Singapore	8
6	2022; Details	Jakarta, Indonesia	Bangladesh	1–1 (5–3 p.s.o.)	Oman	Sri Lanka	4–3	Kazakhstan	9
7	2025; Details	Jakarta, Indonesia	Oman	4–3	Chinese Taipei	Bangladesh	3–0	Kazakhstan	10

== Summary ==
Team	Titles	Runners-up	Third Places	Fourth Places
Bangladesh	4 (2008, 2012, 2016, 2022)		1 (2025)	
Hong Kong	2 (1997*, 2002*)		1 (2016*)	
Oman	1 (2025)	4 (1997, 2008, 2012, 2022)		
Chinese Taipei		2 (2002, 2025)		1 (2012)
Sri Lanka		1 (2016)	4 (1997, 2002, 2012, 2022)	1 (2008)
Singapore			1 (2008*)	3 (1997, 2002, 2016)
Kazakhstan				2 (2022, 2025)

== Team appearances ==
Nation	(Hong Kong) 1997	(Hong Kong) 2002	(Singapore) 2008	(Thailand) 2012	(Hong Kong) 2016	(Indonesia) 2022	(Indonesia) 2025	Total
Bangladesh	–	–	1st	1st	1st	1st	3rd	5
Brunei	–	–	9th	–	–	–	–	1
Chinese Taipei	7th	2nd	5th	4th	7th	–	2nd	6
Hong Kong	1st	1st	7th	8th	3rd	–	5th	6
Indonesia	–	–	–	–	–	7th	9th	2
Iran	–	5th	–	–	–	6th	–	2
Kazakhstan	–	–	–	9th	–	4th	4th	3
Macau	6th	7th	–	–	8th	–	–	3
Oman	2nd	6th	2nd	2nd	–	2nd	1st	6
Singapore	4th	4th	3rd	6th	4th	9th	10th	7
Sri Lanka	3rd	3rd	4th	3rd	2nd	3rd	7th	7
Thailand	–	–	8th	7th	6th	5th	8th	5
Uzbekistan	5th	–	6th	5th	5th	8th	6th	6
Total (13)	7	7	9	9	8	9	10	

== See also ==
- Men's Hockey Asia Cup
- Men's Junior AHF Cup
- Women's AHF Cup
