= 2016 Men's AHF Cup =

Field hockey tournament

Tournament details
- Host country: Hong Kong
- Dates: 19–27 November
- Teams: 8 (from 1 confederation)
- Venue: King's Park Hockey Stadium

Final positions
- Champions: Bangladesh (3rd title)
- Runner-up: Sri Lanka
- Third place: Hong Kong

Tournament statistics
- Matches played: 20
- Goals scored: 115 (5.75 per match)
- Top scorer: (Bangladesh) Ashraful Islam (9 goals)

The 2016 Men's AHF Cup was the fifth edition of the Men's AHF Cup, the quadrennial qualification tournament for the Men's Hockey Asia Cup organised by the Asian Hockey Federation. The tournament was held from 19 to 27 November 2016 at the King's Park Hockey Stadium in Hong Kong.

== Final standings ==
Pos	Team	Qualification
1	Bangladesh	2017 Asia Cup
2	Sri Lanka	2017 Asia Cup
3	Hong Kong (H)	
4	Singapore	
5	Uzbekistan	
6	Thailand	
7	Chinese Taipei	
8	Macau	

Source: FIH
(H) Host

== See also ==
- 2016 Women's AHF Cup
