= India men's national field hockey team =

Indian men's hockey team

India
- Nickname(s): Men in Blue
- Association: Hockey India (2008–present); Indian Hockey Federation (1925–2008)
- Confederation: Asian Hockey Federation
- Head Coach: Craig Fulton
- Assistant coach(es): Michael Cosma; Dennis van de Pol
- Manager: Shivendra Singh
- Captain: Harmanpreet Singh
- Most caps: Manpreet Singh (430)
- Top scorer: Traditional: Dhyan Chand (570); Modern: Harmanpreet Singh (250)
| Home | Away |

FIH ranking
- Current: 8 (6 November 2026)
- Highest: 3 (2021, 2023)
- Lowest: 12 (2009)

First international
- New Zealand 2–5 India (Christchurch, New Zealand; 26 June 1926)

Last international
- India 4–1 Japan (Mohali, India; 5 November 2026)

Biggest win
- India 26–0 Hong Kong (Jakarta, Indonesia; 22 August 2018)

Biggest defeat
- Netherlands 8–0 India (Amstelveen, Nederlands; 1985); Australia 8–0 India (New Delhi, India; 14 October 2010); India 0–8 Argentina (Rourkela, India; 12 February 2026)

Olympic Games
- Appearances: 22 (first in 1928)
- Best result: 1st (1928, 1932, 1936, 1948, 1952, 1956, 1964, 1980)

World Cup
- Appearances: 16 (first in 1971)
- Best result: (gold) 1st (1975)

Asian Games
- Appearances: 18 (first in 1958)
- Best result: 1st (1966, 1998, 2014, 2022, 2026)

Asia Cup
- Appearances: 12 (first in 1982)
- Best result: (gold) 1st (2003, 2007, 2017, 2025)
Medal record
| Event | 1st | 2nd | 3rd |
|---|---|---|---|
| Olympic Games | 8 | 1 | 4 |
| World Cup | 1 | 1 | 1 |
| Asian Games | 5 | 9 | 3 |
| Asia Cup | 4 | 5 | 2 |
| Champions Trophy | 0 | 2 | 1 |
| Asian Champions Trophy | 6 | 1 | 1 |
| Pro League | 0 | 0 | 1 |
| World League | 0 | 0 | 2 |
| Commonwealth Games | 0 | 3 | 0 |
| Total | 24 | 22 | 15 |
Olympic Games
| Gold medal – first place | 1928 Amsterdam | Team |
| Gold medal – first place | 1932 Los Angeles | Team |
| Gold medal – first place | 1936 Berlin | Team |
| Gold medal – first place | 1948 London | Team |
| Gold medal – first place | 1952 Helsinki | Team |
| Gold medal – first place | 1956 Melbourne | Team |
| Gold medal – first place | 1964 Tokyo | Team |
| Gold medal – first place | 1980 Moscow | Team |
| Silver medal – second place | 1960 Rome | Team |
| Bronze medal – third place | 1968 Mexico City | Team |
| Bronze medal – third place | 1972 Munich | Team |
| Bronze medal – third place | 2020 Tokyo | Team |
| Bronze medal – third place | 2024 Paris | Team |
World Cup
| Gold medal – first place | 1975 Kuala Lumpur | |
| Silver medal – second place | 1973 Amstelveen | |
| Bronze medal – third place | 1971 Barcelona | |
Asian Games
| Gold medal – first place | 1966 Bangkok | Team |
| Gold medal – first place | 1998 Bangkok | Team |
| Gold medal – first place | 2014 Incheon | Team |
| Gold medal – first place | 2022 Hangzhou | Team |
| Gold medal – first place | 2026 Aichi-Nagoya | Team |
| Silver medal – second place | 1958 Tokyo | Team |
| Silver medal – second place | 1962 Jakarta | Team |
| Silver medal – second place | 1970 Bangkok | Team |
| Silver medal – second place | 1974 Tehran | Team |
| Silver medal – second place | 1978 Bangkok | Team |
| Silver medal – second place | 1982 New Delhi | Team |
| Silver medal – second place | 1990 Beijing | Team |
| Silver medal – second place | 1994 Hiroshima | Team |
| Silver medal – second place | 2002 Busan | Team |
| Bronze medal – third place | 1986 Seoul | Team |
| Bronze medal – third place | 2010 Guangzhou | Team |
| Bronze medal – third place | 2018 Jakarta / Palembang | Team |
Asia Cup
| Gold medal – first place | 2003 Kuala Lumpur | |
| Gold medal – first place | 2007 Chennai | |
| Gold medal – first place | 2017 Dhaka | |
| Gold medal – first place | 2025 Rajgir | |
| Silver medal – second place | 1982 Karachi | |
| Silver medal – second place | 1985 Dhaka | |
| Silver medal – second place | 1989 New Delhi | |
| Silver medal – second place | 1994 Hiroshima | |
| Silver medal – second place | 2013 Ipoh | |
| Bronze medal – third place | 1999 Kuala Lumpur | |
| Bronze medal – third place | 2022 Jakarta | |
Champions Trophy
| Silver medal – second place | 2016 London | |
| Silver medal – second place | 2018 Breda | |
| Bronze medal – third place | 1982 Amstelveen | |
Asian Champions Trophy
| Gold medal – first place | 2011 Ordos | |
| Gold medal – first place | 2016 Kuantan | |
| Gold medal – first place | 2018 Muscat | |
| Gold medal – first place | 2023 Chennai | |
| Gold medal – first place | 2024 Hulunbuir | |
| Gold medal – first place | 2026 Punjab | |
| Silver medal – second place | 2012 Doha | |
| Bronze medal – third place | 2021 Dhaka | |
Pro League
| Bronze medal – third place | 2021–22 | |
Hockey World League
| Bronze medal – third place | 2014–15 Raipur | Team |
| Bronze medal – third place | 2016–17 Bhubaneswar | Team |
Commonwealth Games
| Silver medal – second place | 2010 New Delhi | Team |
| Silver medal – second place | 2014 Glasgow | Team |
| Silver medal – second place | 2022 Birmingham | Team |

The India men's national field hockey team represents India in international field hockey competitions. The team is governed by the association Hockey India. They are Olympic bronze medallists and the reigning Asian Games champions.

The Indian men's team is one of the most successful national field hockey teams in the world, having won a record eight Olympic gold medals. In 1928, the team won its first Olympic gold medal and then remained unbeaten at the Olympics through 1956, winning six consecutive gold medals. India had a 30–0 winning streak at the Summer Games before losing the 1960 final. India again won the gold medal at the 1964 and 1980 Olympics. India also won its first Hockey World Cup in 1975.

The Indian team has the best overall record in Olympic history, with 87 victories from 142 matches. India also holds the record for scoring the most Olympic goals and is the only team to win the Olympics without conceding a single goal, having done so in 1928 and 1956.

The Indian team is one of the most successful teams in Asia. They have won the Asian Games five times: in 1966, 1998, 2014, 2022 and 2026. They have also won the Hockey Asia Cup four times: in 2003, 2007, 2017, and 2025. They have won 52 of the 70 Asia Cup matches and hold the record for the most wins and the best winning percentage in the competition. India is also the most successful team in the Asian Champions Trophy, winning it six times, in 2011, 2016, 2018, 2023, 2024 and 2026. In total, India has won 33 official senior international titles, including Sultan Azlan Shah Cup five times, Champions Challenge in 2001, South Asian Games in 1995, Afro-Asian Games in 2003, and FIH Hockey Series in 2018–19. (Note: Excluding the Western Asiatic Games gold medal, as the tournament is not officially recognised by FIH.)

India is known to have an intense rivalry with Pakistan, with whom they have played in the finals of major tournaments such as the Olympics, World Cup, Asian Games, and Asia Cup.

== History ==
=== Golden years (1926–1959) ===
The first widely acknowledged foreign tour by an Indian hockey team was to New Zealand in 1926. The Indian team was mainly an Indian army hockey team consisting of 17 players, four of whom were British Officers. They played a total of 21 matches in New Zealand which were mainly against local club sides but three games were against the New Zealand national team. Those three matches were retrospectively given official status making the meeting against New Zealand on 26 June as India's first ever FIH recognised match. Dhyan Chand scored the first goal as well as a hat-trick. Both were firsts for an Indian team in international play. India won 5–2. In the second test match on 10 July New Zealand won the match 4–3. The third test match on 17 July was a 1–1 draw.

India participated at the Olympics for the first time in 1928. In the group stage, India beat Austria 6–0, Belgium 9–0 and Switzerland 5–0 without conceding a single goal. They defeated the Netherlands 3–0 in the finals under the captaincy of Jaipal Singh Munda.

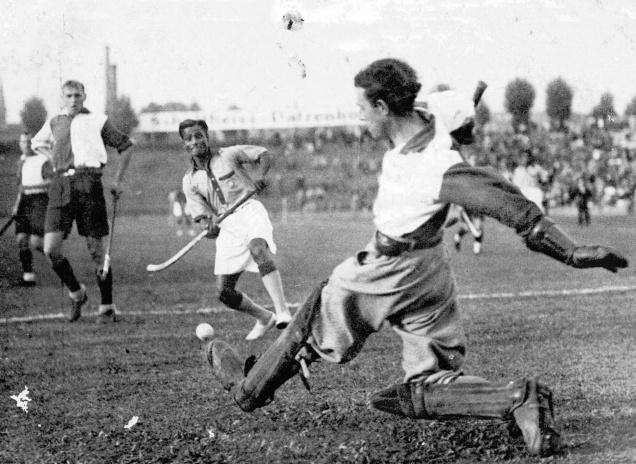
India vs Berlin XI in 1936

India then went on to successfully defend their title at the 1932 Olympics with a 11–1 win over Japan and 24–1 win over United States, in that match Dhyan Chand scored 8 goals and Roop Singh scored 10 goals, the highest by any player in an Olympic match. This is the largest margin of victory ever in the Olympic games. India went on to win their third straight title at the 1936 Olympics, this time captained by legendary player Dhyan Chand himself. India stormed through the group stage by winning against Japan 9–0, Hungary 4–0 and United States 7–0. In the semi-finals they defeated France 10–0. The team went on to face Germany in the final. The match was won by India 8–1, and it still remains the biggest winning margin in an Olympic final. The Indian hockey team that won three successive Olympic titles is often regarded as one of the greatest ever to play the sport.

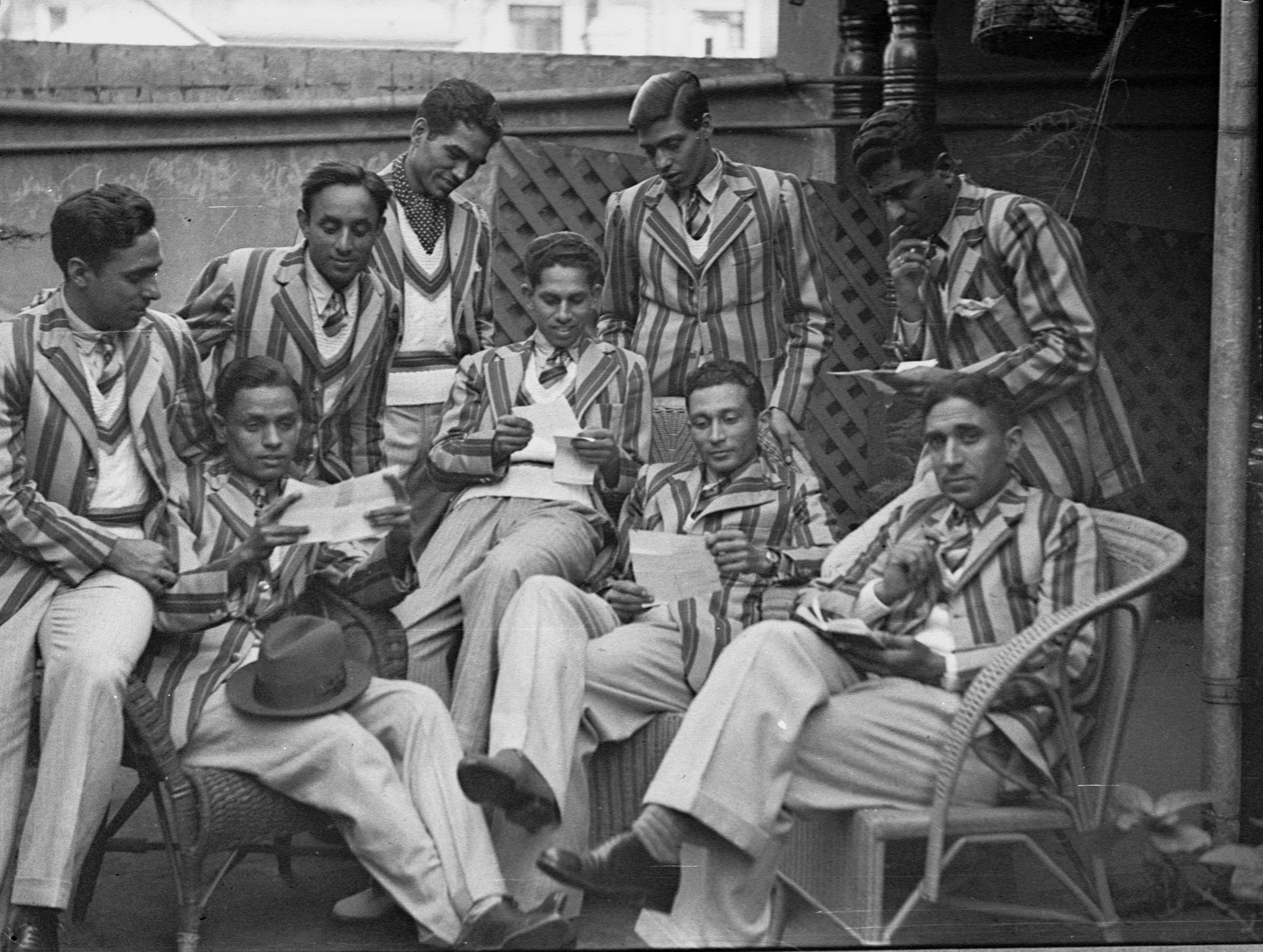
Indian hockey team, Sydney, 1938

World War II caused the cancellation of 1940 and 1944 Olympics, which ended the era of a team that dominated world hockey.

At the 1948 Olympics India was placed in group A and won all the three games, an 8–0 win over Austria, Argentina 9–1 and Spain 2–0. In the final India went on to face Great Britain, it was the first time India faced them. The skilled British team had already won the gold medal in 1908 and 1920, so this match was billed as a Battle of Champions, and eventually India won the match 4–0. The result was a sweet one for India, which gained independence from Britain just a year before. This win is often regarded as one of the greatest ever moments of Indian field hockey and also all of Indian sports.

India went on to win two further gold medals in 1952 and 1956, preserving its record as the most successful and dominant team at that time in the Olympics. In 1952 Olympics quarter-finals India won against Austria 4–0, Great Britain 3–1 in semi-final and defeated Netherlands 6–1 in the final. The match is famous for the five-goal magical performance of Balbir Singh Sr., which is an Olympic record that still stands today. At the 1956 Olympics India defeated Afghanistan 14–0, United States 16–0 and Singapore 6–0 in group stage. Then they defeated Germany 1–0 in the semi-final. In the final India faced Pakistan and won the match 1–0, which was the beginning of the biggest rivalry in field hockey. India and Pakistan again met each other in 1958 Asian Games and this time the match ended in a 0–0 draw. India also defeated Japan 8–0, South Korea 2–1 and Malaysia 6–0. However, Pakistan claimed the gold medal due to better goal difference.

=== Last years of dominance (1960–1980) ===
In the 1960 Olympics India started its campaign by winning against Denmark 10–0, and Netherlands 4–1, New Zealand 3–0. India defeated Australia and Great Britain in quarter-finals and semi-finals respectively. In the final it was the beginning of a new era, for the first time India lost a match at the Olympics, a 0–1 loss to Pakistan in the final which ended India's streak of six successive gold medals and 30 matches unbeaten run. Two years later India went on to win another silver medal at the 1962 Asian Games. India returned strongly at the 1964 Tokyo Olympics by registering wins against Hong Kong, Belgium, Netherlands, Malaysia and Canada and drawing with Spain and Germany. In the Semi-finals India defeated Australia 3–1, and they won against Pakistan in the final to take their seventh gold medal at the games and also went on to capture their first gold medal in 1966 Asian Games by defeating Pakistan again in the final.

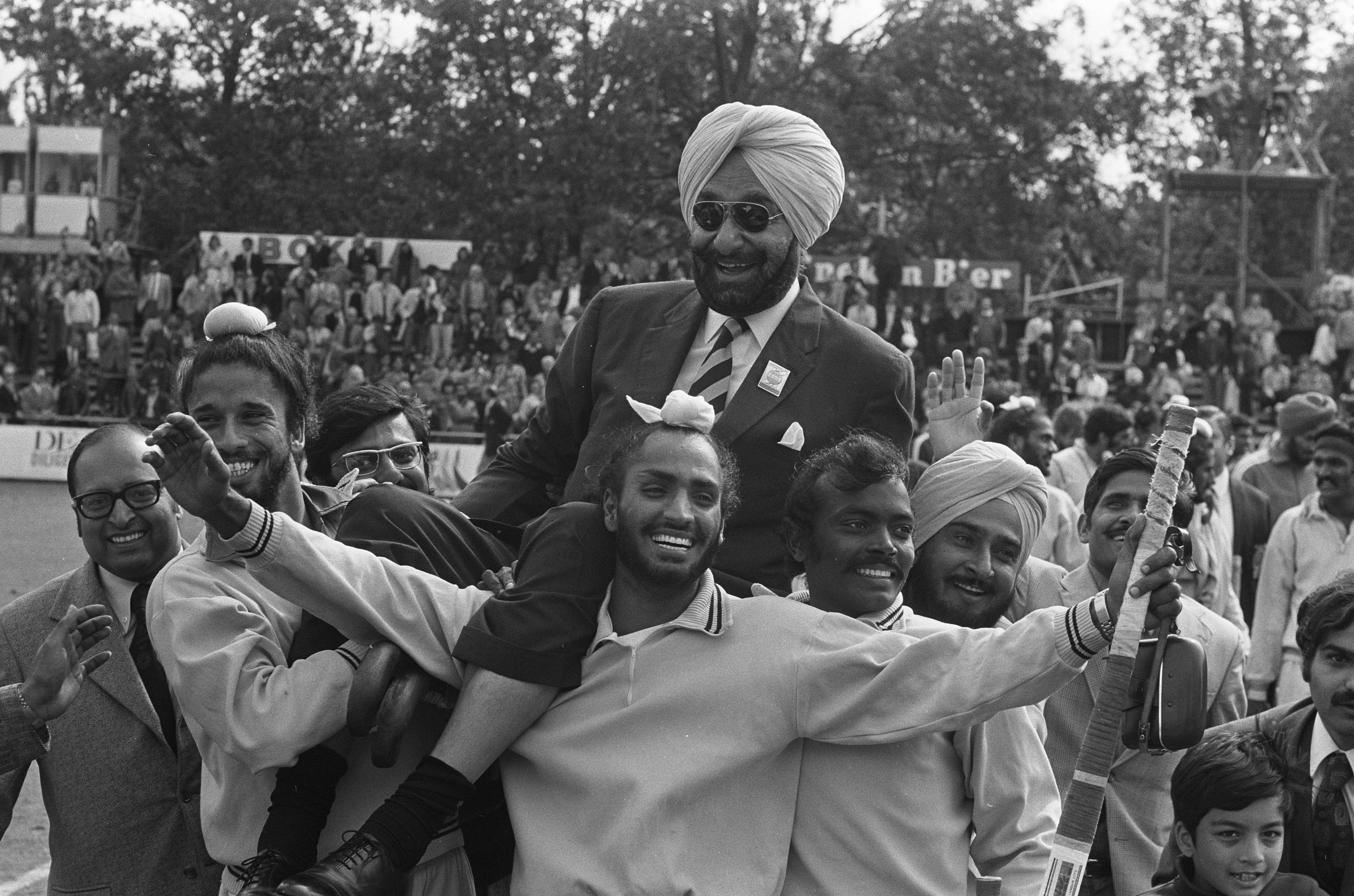
Indian team celebrating their 1–0 win over Pakistan in the 1973 World Cup semi-finals

In the 1968 Mexico Olympics, India started with a loss against New Zealand but won all of their remaining 6 matches against West Germany, Japan, Spain, Mexico, East Germany and Belgium but India went to a new low, for the first time as they were defeated in the semi-final by Australia, but they successfully claimed the bronze medal by beating West Germany. In the 1972 Olympics India started brightly by defeating Great Britain, Australia, Kenya, New Zealand and Mexico but drew with Netherlands and Poland. They were defeated in the semi-finals by Pakistan. In the third-place match India defeated the Netherlands to claim bronze medal.

India won the bronze medal at the 1971 World Cup by defeating Kenya in the third-place playoffs. At the 1973 World Cup India defeated Pakistan in semi-finals, but lost to Netherlands in the final in penalty shootout after the match ended in a 2–2 draw. But at the 1975 World Cup India defeated Malaysia in the semi-final before beating arch-rivals Pakistan in the final to claim their first title. In the 1976 Olympics astro-turf hockey pitch was introduced, India struggled to maintain their dominance like they did on grass fields and for the first time ever returned home empty handed. The 1980 Olympics was held in Moscow, India started their campaign with an 18–0 win over Tanzania followed by a 2–2 draw with both Poland and Spain respectively. Later followed by resounding wins over Cuba with a margin of 13–0 and Soviet Union by the scoreline of 4–2. India later won the gold medal for a record eighth time by defeating Spain in the final by the score of 4–3.

=== Decline (1981–1997) ===
After the 1980 Olympics success India's performance declined and the following decades resulted in a lot of ups and downs for the national team. As the team failed to win any medal in the World Cups or Olympics, but continued to be a top team in Asia and went on to win several medals in continental competitions. The 1982 World Cup was hosted by India and they finished at fifth position. The team lost to Pakistan in both 1982 Asian Games final and the inaugural Asia Cup final held in Karachi. India ended the decade by winning bronze medals at the 1986 Asian Games and 1982 Champions Trophy and silver medals at the 1985 Asia Cup and 1989 Asia Cup. Their only gold medal success in a big tournament in the decade came at the 1985 Sultan Azlan Shah Cup. India also went on to win 1991 Sultan Azlan Shah Cup and reached finals of 1994 Asia Cup and 1994 Asian Games but lost to South Korea in both the finals. The team then went on to win the 1995 Sultan Azlan Shah Cup.

=== Attempts at resurgence and continued struggles (1998–2019) ===
India won their first continental title after 32 years at the 1998 Asian Games by defeating South Korea. The team finished fourth at the 1998 Commonwealth Games. They ended the decade by collecting bronze medal at the 1999 Asia Cup.

India started the new millennium by winning the inaugural Hockey Champions Challenge by defeating South Africa in the final. In 2003 India won their first ever Asia Cup title by defeating Pakistan in the final. The same year India also clinched the first and only Afro-Asian Games title by defeating Pakistan again in the final. For the first time in their history the team did not win a medal at the Asian Games as they finished fifth at the 2006 Asian Games, but India defended their title successfully in the Asia Cup by winning the 2007 Asia Cup. In the final the team conveniently beat South Korea 7–2. India failed to qualify for 2008 Beijing Games for the first time.

The next Asia Cup tournament in 2009 proved to be disastrous as the team finished fifth and failed to get any medal. But the team regained momentum after winning the 2009 Sultan Azlan Shah Cup and also became the joint winners in the 2010 edition. In the 2010 World Cup, which was hosted in India, and the team finished on 8th position. In the 2010 Commonwealth Games which was again hosted by India, the national team reached the final where they were defeated 0–8 by Australia, the biggest defeat India ever suffered. India became the first ever champions of the Asian Champions Trophy after they beat Pakistan in the final of the 2011 edition. In 2012 the team finished last at the Olympics as they lost all their matches, it was disappointing given the fact that they are the most successful team ever at the Olympics. India also finished as runners-up at the 2012 Asian Champions Trophy.

After the disappointment in Olympics, India played at the 2013 Asian Champions Trophy but could only finish at 5th place. The 2014 Asian Games became the turning point as the team defeated Pakistan to win their third gold medal. In 2014–15 Hockey World League India won the bronze medal by beating Netherlands. The team reached the finals of 2016 Champions Trophy but lost to Australia in penalty shootout. India were the only team to defeat eventual gold medallists Argentina in the 2016 Olympics. They made it to the knockout stage after 36 years but lost to Belgium in the quarter-final. They bounced back by winning 2016 Asian Champions Trophy by defeating Pakistan and 2017 Asia Cup by defeating Malaysia. India also won bronze medal at the 2016–17 Hockey World League by defeating Germany 2–1.

The 2018 Asian Games proved little disappointing as India was the defending champions as well as the favorites to win but was surprised by Malaysia in semi-final. They later won bronze medal by defeating Pakistan 2–1. The team returned strongly by winning 2018 Asian Champions Trophy and collecting a gold medal at the 2018–19 Men's Hockey Series. India played as hosts in the 2018 Hockey World Cup and reached the quarter-finals but lost to Netherlands.

=== Olympic comeback (2020–present) ===
Indian team won bronze in 2020 Tokyo Olympics after defeating Germany 5–4. This was a historic win as the Indian Hockey team won a medal in Olympics after a gap of 41 years. In 2023, India hosted the 15th edition of World Cup but missed the quarter-final spot to New Zealand in shoot-out and finished 9th. India beat Japan 8–0 in one of the matches of that tournament, their biggest win in the World Cup history. They made a successful run at the Asian Champions Trophy and the Asian Games both of which India won undefeated. They also won the bronze medal for the second consecutive time at the 2024 Paris Olympics by defeating Spain 2–1. In the tournament, India registered victory against Australia in the Olympics after 52 years and edged past Great Britain in a shootout in the quarter-final after being reduced to ten men following Amit Rohidas's red card. India won the 2025 Asia Cup in Rajgir by defeating South Korea. India finished eighth in the 2026 World Cup after the second round exit without reaching the semi-final. India successfully retained their Asiad gold for the first time in history by winning the 2026 edition and secured the 2028 Olympics spot. They also retained the Asian Champions Trophy. India are contesting in the Centenary series against New Zealand that commemorates 100 years of hockey and sporting ties between the two countries.

== Gallery ==
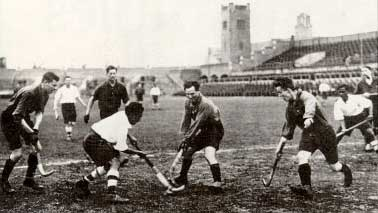
Match of the Indian team at the 1928 Amsterdam Olympics

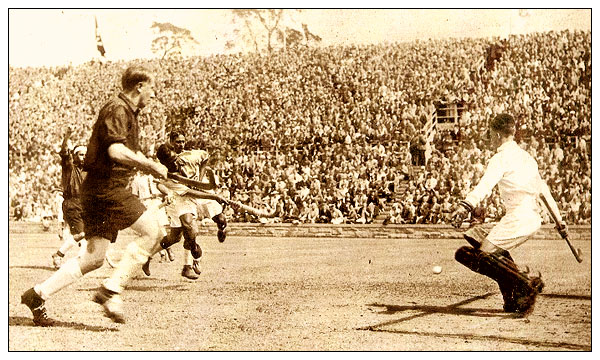
Match of India against United States at the 1932 Los Angeles Olympics

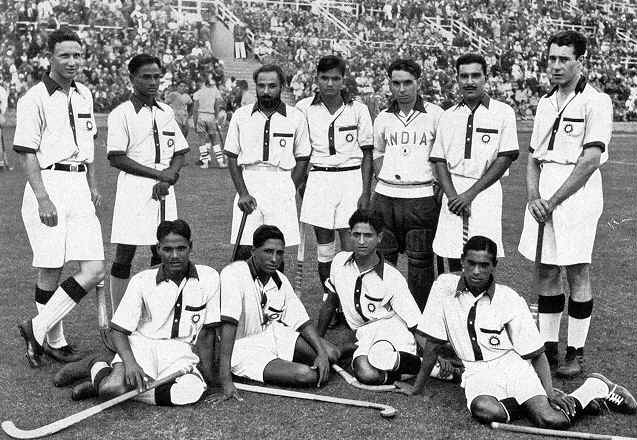
The Indian team that won the gold medal at the 1936 Berlin Olympics

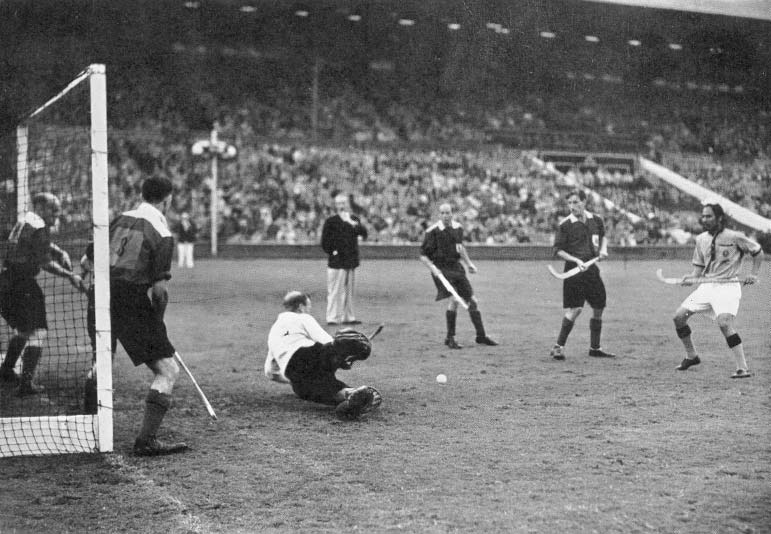
India scoring their third goal against Britain at the 1948 London Olympic final

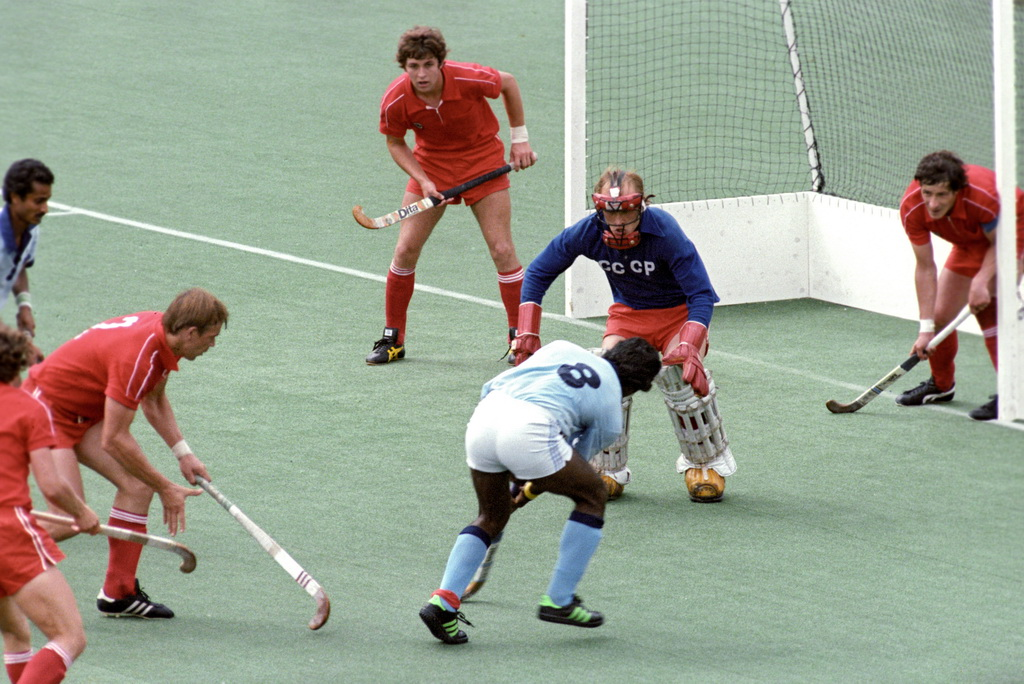
Team India playing against Soviet Union at the 1980 Moscow Olympics

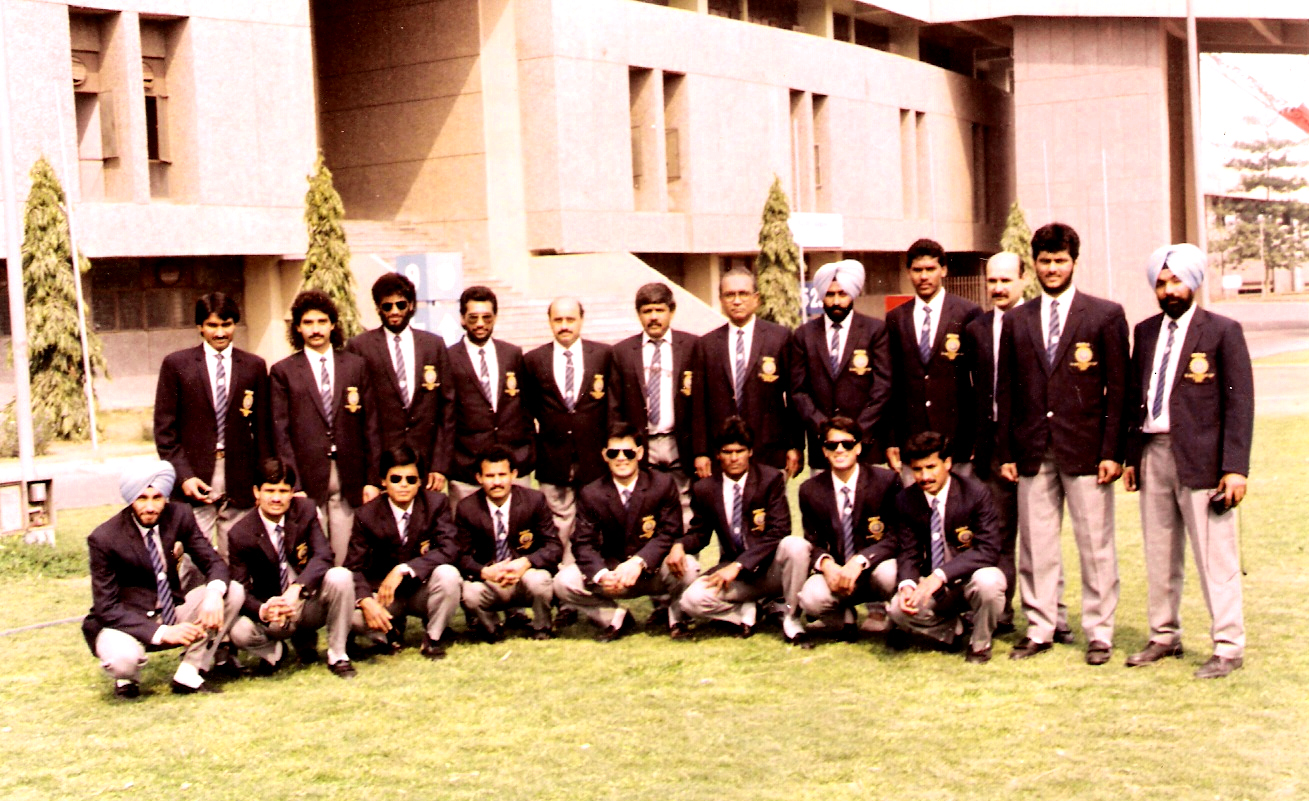
Indian team in the 1988 Seoul Summer Olympics

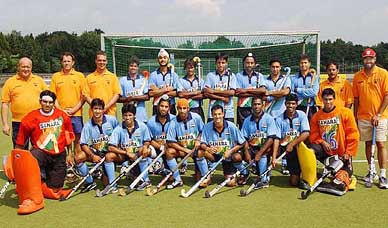
Indian hockey team in the 2000s

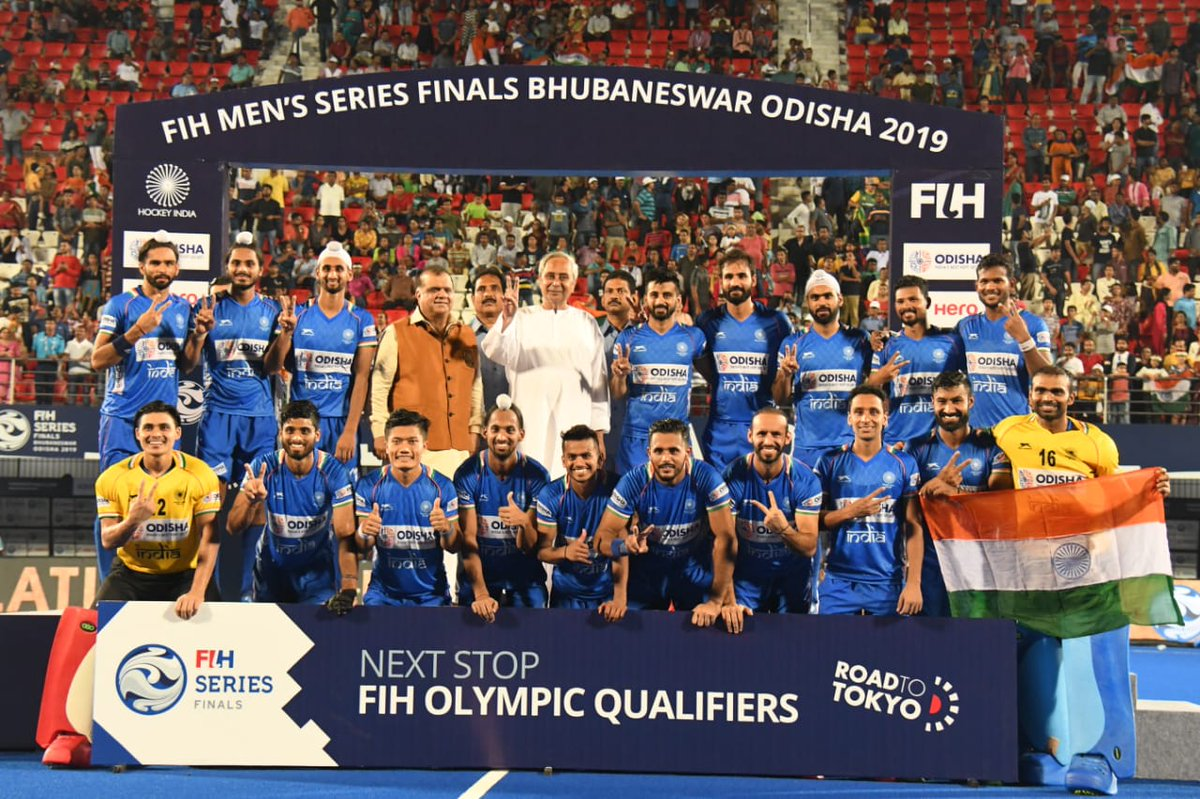
India after winning the FIH Hockey Series

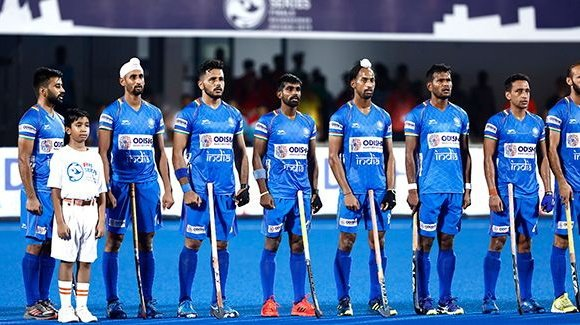
Indian field hockey team in 2010s

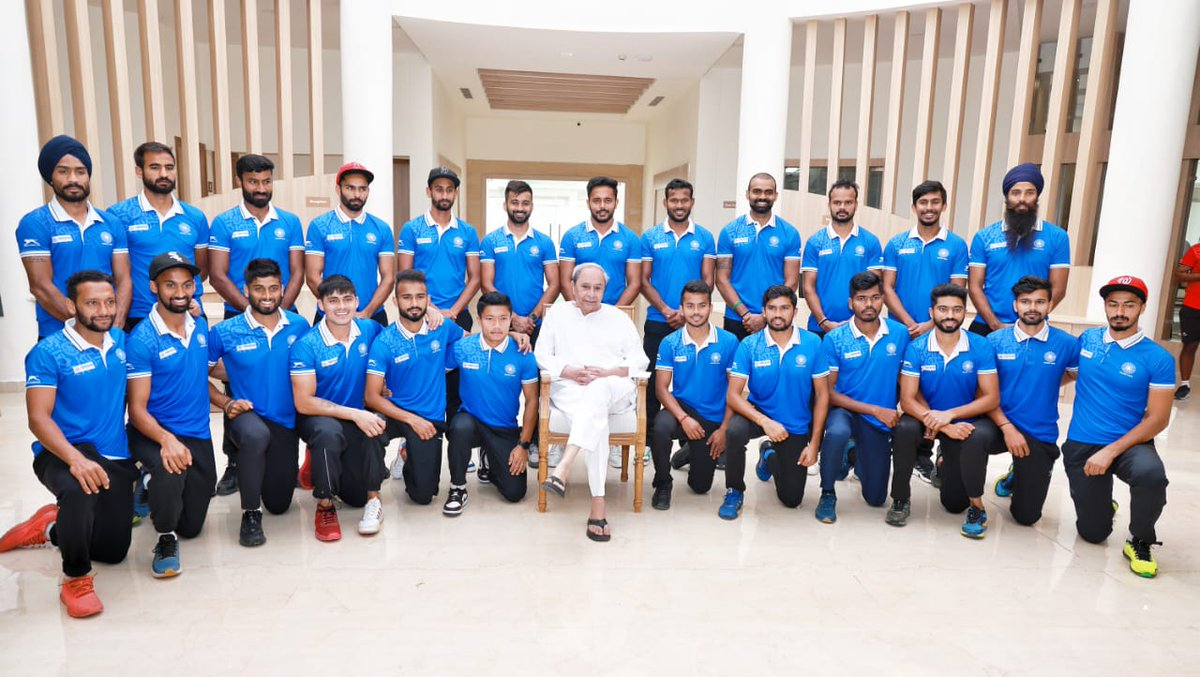
Indian field hockey team in the 2020s

== Performance record ==
Champions Runners-up Third place Fourth place Did not qualify Tournament played fully or partially on home soil

=== Major tournaments ===
==== Summer Olympics ====
Summer Olympics
| Year | Host | Round | Position | Pld | W | D | L | GF | GA |
|---|---|---|---|---|---|---|---|---|---|
| 1908 | London, United Kingdom | Did not exist | | | | | | | |
| 1920 | Antwerp, Belgium | Did not exist | | | | | | | |
| 1928 | Amsterdam, Netherlands | Final | 1st place, gold medalist(s) | 5 | 5 | 0 | 0 | 29 | 0 |
| 1932 | Los Angeles, United States | Group stage | 1st place, gold medalist(s) | 2 | 2 | 0 | 0 | 35 | 2 |
| 1936 | (Nazi Germany) Berlin, Germany | Final | 1st place, gold medalist(s) | 5 | 5 | 0 | 0 | 38 | 1 |
| 1948 | London, United Kingdom | Final | 1st place, gold medalist(s) | 5 | 5 | 0 | 0 | 25 | 2 |
| 1952 | Helsinki, Finland | Final | 1st place, gold medalist(s) | 3 | 3 | 0 | 0 | 13 | 2 |
| 1956 | Melbourne, Australia | Final | 1st place, gold medalist(s) | 5 | 5 | 0 | 0 | 38 | 0 |
| 1960 | Rome, Italy | Final | 2nd place, silver medalist(s) | 6 | 5 | 0 | 1 | 19 | 2 |
| 1964 | Tokyo, Japan | Final | 1st place, gold medalist(s) | 9 | 7 | 2 | 0 | 22 | 5 |
| 1968 | Mexico City, Mexico | Semi-finals | 3rd place, bronze medalist(s) | 9 | 7 | 0 | 2 | 23 | 7 |
| 1972 | Munich, West Germany | Semi-finals | 3rd place, bronze medalist(s) | 9 | 6 | 2 | 1 | 27 | 11 |
| 1976 | Montreal, Canada | Group stage | 7th place | 8 | 4 | 1 | 3 | 17 | 13 |
| 1980 | Moscow, Soviet Union | Final | 1st place, gold medalist(s) | 6 | 4 | 2 | 0 | 43 | 9 |
| 1984 | Los Angeles, United States | Group stage | 5th place | 7 | 5 | 1 | 1 | 20 | 11 |
| 1988 | Seoul, South Korea | Group stage | 6th place | 7 | 2 | 2 | 3 | 16 | 15 |
| 1992 | Barcelona, Spain | Group stage | 7th place | 7 | 3 | 0 | 4 | 7 | 12 |
| 1996 | Atlanta, United States | Group stage | 8th place | 7 | 2 | 3 | 2 | 14 | 10 |
| 2000 | Sydney, Australia | Group stage | 7th place | 7 | 3 | 2 | 2 | 13 | 10 |
| 2004 | Athens, Greece | Group stage | 7th place | 7 | 2 | 1 | 4 | 16 | 18 |
| 2008 | Beijing, China | Did not qualify | | | | | | | |
| 2012 | London, United Kingdom | Group stage | 12th place | 6 | 0 | 0 | 6 | 8 | 21 |
| 2016 | Rio de Janeiro, Brazil | Quarter-finals | 8th place | 6 | 2 | 1 | 3 | 10 | 12 |
| 2020 | Tokyo, Japan | Semi-finals | 3rd place, bronze medalist(s) | 8 | 6 | 0 | 2 | 25 | 23 |
| 2024 | Paris, France | Semi-finals | 3rd place, bronze medalist(s) | 8 | 4 | 2 | 2 | 15 | 12 |
| 2028 | Los Angeles, United States | Qualified | | | | | | | |
| | Total | | 8 titles | 142 | 87 | 19 | 36 | 473 | 198 |

==== Summer Olympics Qualifiers ====
Summer Olympics Qualifiers
| Year | Host | Position | Result | Pld | W | D | L | GF | GA |
|---|---|---|---|---|---|---|---|---|---|
| 1991 | Auckland, New Zealand | 2nd | Qualified for 1992 Summer Olympics | 7 | 3 | 2 | 2 | 16 | 7 |
| 1996 | Barcelona, Spain | 2nd | Qualified for 1996 Summer Olympics | 7 | 4 | 3 | 0 | 15 | 7 |
| 2004 | Madrid, Spain | 4th | Qualified for 2004 Summer Olympics | 7 | 3 | 1 | 3 | 21 | 21 |
| 2008 | Santiago, Chile | 2nd | Failed to Qualify for 2008 Summer Olympics | 6 | 4 | 0 | 2 | 39 | 10 |
| 2012 | Delhi, India | 1st | Qualified for 2012 Summer Olympics | 6 | 6 | 0 | 0 | 44 | 9 |
| 2019 | Bhubaneswar, India | —N/a | Qualified for 2020 Summer Olympics | 2 | 2 | 0 | 0 | 11 | 3 |
| | Total | | 1 title | 35 | 22 | 6 | 7 | 146 | 57 |

==== World Cup ====
World Cup
| Year | Host | Round | Position | Pld | W | D | L | GF | GA |
|---|---|---|---|---|---|---|---|---|---|
| 1971 | Barcelona, Spain | Semi-finals | 3rd place, bronze medalist(s) | 6 | 5 | 0 | 1 | 8 | 3 |
| 1973 | Amstelveen, Netherlands | Final | 2nd place, silver medalist(s) | 7 | 4 | 3 | 0 | 15 | 3 |
| 1975 | Kuala Lumpur, Malaysia | Final | 1st place, gold medalist(s) | 7 | 5 | 1 | 1 | 19 | 8 |
| 1978 | Buenos Aires, Argentina | Group stage | 6th place | 8 | 4 | 1 | 3 | 11 | 16 |
| 1982 | Bombay, India | Group stage | 5th place | 7 | 5 | 0 | 2 | 29 | 15 |
| 1986 | London, England | Group stage | 12th place | 7 | 1 | 1 | 5 | 8 | 16 |
| 1990 | Lahore, Pakistan | Group stage | 10th place | 7 | 1 | 1 | 5 | 12 | 18 |
| 1994 | Sydney, Australia | Group stage | 5th place | 7 | 3 | 2 | 2 | 14 | 12 |
| 1998 | Utrecht, Netherlands | Group stage | 9th place | 7 | 3 | 0 | 4 | 13 | 19 |
| 2002 | Kuala Lumpur, Malaysia | Group stage | 10th place | 9 | 3 | 1 | 5 | 22 | 17 |
| 2006 | Mönchengladbach, Germany | Group stage | 11th place | 7 | 1 | 1 | 5 | 10 | 18 |
| 2010 | New Delhi, India | Group stage | 8th place | 6 | 1 | 1 | 4 | 15 | 21 |
| 2014 | The Hague, Netherlands | Group stage | 9th place | 6 | 2 | 1 | 3 | 10 | 12 |
| 2018 | Bhubaneswar, India | Quarter-finals | 6th place | 4 | 2 | 1 | 1 | 13 | 5 |
| 2023 | Bhubaneswar & Rourkela, India | Cross-overs | 9th place | 6 | 4 | 2 | 0 | 22 | 7 |
| 2026 | Wavre, Belgium & Amstelveen, Netherlands | Second round | 8th place | 6 | 2 | 1 | 3 | 17 | 19 |
| | Total | | 1 title | 107 | 46 | 17 | 44 | 238 | 209 |

==== World Cup Qualifiers ====
World Cup Qualifiers
| Year | Host | Position | Result | Pld | W | D | L | GF | GA |
|---|---|---|---|---|---|---|---|---|---|
| 1989 | Madison, United States | 3rd | Qualified for 1990 World Cup | 7 | 5 | 2 | 0 | 21 | 7 |
| 1993 | Poznań, Poland | 3rd | Qualified for 1994 World Cup | 7 | 4 | 2 | 1 | 18 | 9 |
| 2001 | Edinburgh, Scotland | 5th | Qualified for 2002 World Cup | 8 | 5 | 1 | 2 | 15 | 12 |
| | Total | | 3rd | 22 | 14 | 5 | 3 | 54 | 28 |

==== Asian Games ====
Asian Games
| Year | Host | Round | Position | Pld | W | D | L | GF | GA |
|---|---|---|---|---|---|---|---|---|---|
| 1958 | Tokyo, Japan | Group stage | 2nd place, silver medalist(s) | 4 | 3 | 1 | 0 | 16 | 1 |
| 1962 | Jakarta, Indonesia | Final | 2nd place, silver medalist(s) | 5 | 4 | 0 | 1 | 19 | 2 |
| 1966 | Bangkok, Thailand | Final | 1st place, gold medalist(s) | 5 | 5 | 0 | 0 | 13 | 0 |
| 1970 | Bangkok, Thailand | Final | 2nd place, silver medalist(s) | 5 | 4 | 0 | 1 | 16 | 1 |
| 1974 | Tehran, Iran | Group stage | 2nd place, silver medalist(s) | 6 | 4 | 1 | 1 | 25 | 3 |
| 1978 | Bangkok, Thailand | Final | 2nd place, silver medalist(s) | 5 | 4 | 0 | 1 | 18 | 5 |
| 1982 | New Delhi, India | Final | 2nd place, silver medalist(s) | 6 | 5 | 0 | 1 | 45 | 10 |
| 1986 | Seoul, South Korea | Semi-finals | 3rd place, bronze medalist(s) | 6 | 4 | 1 | 1 | 30 | 6 |
| 1990 | Beijing, China | Group Stage | 2nd place, silver medalist(s) | 6 | 5 | 0 | 1 | 22 | 3 |
| 1994 | Hiroshima, Japan | Final | 2nd place, silver medalist(s) | 5 | 4 | 0 | 1 | 10 | 4 |
| 1998 | Bangkok, Thailand | Final | 1st place, gold medalist(s) | 6 | 5 | 1 | 0 | 24 | 4 |
| 2002 | Busan, South Korea | Final | 2nd place, silver medalist(s) | 5 | 3 | 1 | 1 | 16 | 9 |
| 2006 | Doha, Qatar | Group stage | 5th place | 6 | 4 | 1 | 1 | 34 | 5 |
| 2010 | Guangzhou, China | Semi-finals | 3rd place, bronze medalist(s) | 6 | 5 | 0 | 1 | 26 | 8 |
| 2014 | Incheon, South Korea | Final | 1st place, gold medalist(s) | 6 | 4 | 1 | 1 | 20 | 3 |
| 2018 | Jakarta, Indonesia | Semi-finals | 3rd place, bronze medalist(s) | 7 | 6 | 1 | 0 | 80 | 6 |
| 2022 | Hangzhou, China | Final | 1st place, gold medalist(s) | 7 | 7 | 0 | 0 | 68 | 9 |
| 2026 | Aichi and Nagoya, Japan | Final | 1st place, gold medalist(s) | 7 | 7 | 0 | 0 | 58 | 8 |
| | Total | | 5 titles | 103 | 83 | 8 | 12 | 535 | 87 |

==== Asia Cup ====
Asia Cup
| Year | Host | Round | Position | Pld | W | D | L | GF | GA |
|---|---|---|---|---|---|---|---|---|---|
| 1982 | Karachi, Pakistan | Group stage | 2nd place, silver medalist(s) | 6 | 5 | 0 | 1 | 40 | 4 |
| 1985 | Dhaka, Bangladesh | Final | 2nd place, silver medalist(s) | 6 | 5 | 0 | 1 | 33 | 7 |
| 1989 | New Delhi, India | Final | 2nd place, silver medalist(s) | 5 | 4 | 0 | 1 | 15 | 2 |
| 1994 | Hiroshima, Japan | Final | 2nd place, silver medalist(s) | 6 | 3 | 2 | 1 | 15 | 7 |
| 1999 | Kuala Lumpur, Malaysia | Semi-finals | 3rd place, bronze medalist(s) | 5 | 3 | 1 | 1 | 17 | 9 |
| 2003 | Kuala Lumpur, Malaysia | Final | 1st place, gold medalist(s) | 5 | 4 | 0 | 1 | 25 | 9 |
| 2007 | Chennai, India | Final | 1st place, gold medalist(s) | 7 | 7 | 0 | 0 | 57 | 5 |
| 2009 | Kuantan, Malaysia | Group stage | 5th place | 4 | 2 | 1 | 1 | 20 | 7 |
| 2013 | Ipoh, Malaysia | Final | 2nd place, silver medalist(s) | 5 | 4 | 0 | 1 | 24 | 5 |
| 2017 | Dhaka, Bangladesh | Final | 1st place, gold medalist(s) | 7 | 6 | 1 | 0 | 28 | 6 |
| 2022 | Jakarta, Indonesia | Second round | 3rd place, bronze medalist(s) | 7 | 3 | 3 | 1 | 29 | 14 |
| 2025 | Rajgir, India | Final | 1st place, gold medalist(s) | 7 | 6 | 1 | 0 | 39 | 9 |
| | Total | | 4 titles | 70 | 52 | 9 | 9 | 342 | 84 |

==== Asian Champions Trophy ====
Asian Champions Trophy
| Year | Host | Round | Position | Pld | W | D | L | GF | GA |
|---|---|---|---|---|---|---|---|---|---|
| 2011 | Ordos, China | Final | 1st place, gold medalist(s) | 6 | 2 | 4 | 0 | 15 | 8 |
| 2012 | Doha, Qatar | Final | 2nd place, silver medalist(s) | 6 | 4 | 0 | 2 | 27 | 12 |
| 2013 | Kakamigahara, Japan | Group stage | 5th place | 6 | 3 | 0 | 3 | 18 | 13 |
| 2016 | Kuantan, Malaysia | Final | 1st place, gold medalist(s) | 7 | 5 | 2 | 0 | 30 | 10 |
| 2018 | Muscat, Oman | Final | 1st place, gold medalist(s) | 6 | 5 | 1 | 0 | 30 | 4 |
| 2021 | Dhaka, Bangladesh | Semi-finals | 3rd place, bronze medalist(s) | 6 | 4 | 1 | 1 | 27 | 11 |
| 2023 | Chennai, India | Final | 1st place, gold medalist(s) | 7 | 6 | 1 | 0 | 29 | 8 |
| 2024 | Hulunbuir, China | Final | 1st place, gold medalist(s) | 7 | 7 | 0 | 0 | 26 | 5 |
| 2026 | Punjab, India | Final | 1st place, gold medalist(s) | 7 | 7 | 0 | 0 | 46 | 7 |
| | Total | | 6 titles | 58 | 43 | 9 | 6 | 248 | 78 |

==== Commonwealth Games ====
Commonwealth Games
| Year | Host | Round | Position | Pld | W | D | L | GF | GA |
|---|---|---|---|---|---|---|---|---|---|
| 1998 | Kuala Lumpur, Malaysia | Semi-finals | 4th place | 7 | 4 | 1 | 2 | 22 | 12 |
| 2006 | Melbourne, Australia | Group stage | 6th place | 5 | 2 | 1 | 2 | 15 | 8 |
| 2010 | New Delhi, India | Final | 2nd place, silver medalist(s) | 6 | 3 | 1 | 2 | 19 | 22 |
| 2014 | Glasgow, Scotland | Final | 2nd place, silver medalist(s) | 6 | 4 | 0 | 2 | 19 | 15 |
| 2018 | Gold Coast, Queensland, Australia | Semi-finals | 4th place | 6 | 3 | 1 | 2 | 15 | 14 |
| 2022 | Birmingham, England | Final | 2nd place, silver medalist(s) | 6 | 4 | 1 | 1 | 30 | 14 |
| | Total | | Runners-up | 36 | 20 | 5 | 11 | 120 | 85 |

==== Pro League ====
Pro League
| Year | Host | Position | Pld | W | D | L | GF | GA |
|---|---|---|---|---|---|---|---|---|
| 2020–21 | N/A | 4th place | 8 | 3 | 3 | 2 | 22 | 17 |
| 2021–22 | N/A | 3rd place, bronze medalist(s) | 16 | 8 | 4 | 4 | 62 | 40 |
| 2022–23 | N/A | 4th place | 16 | 8 | 3 | 5 | 51 | 42 |
| 2023–24 | N/A | 7th place | 16 | 5 | 6 | 5 | 38 | 35 |
| 2024–25 | N/A | 8th place | 16 | 6 | 0 | 10 | 34 | 38 |
| 2025–26 | N/A | 8th place | 16 | 4 | 5 | 7 | 31 | 39 |
| 2026–27 | N/A | | | | | | | |
| Total | | Third place | 88 | 34 | 21 | 33 | 238 | 211 |

=== Other tournaments ===
==== Sultan Azlan Shah Cup ====
Sultan Azlan Shah Cup
| Year | Host | Round | Position | Pld | W | D | L | GF | GA |
|---|---|---|---|---|---|---|---|---|---|
| 1983 | Malaysia | Group stage | 3rd place, bronze medalist(s) | 5 | 1 | 2 | 2 | 10 | 8 |
| 1985 | Malaysia | Final | 1st place, gold medalist(s) | 4 | 3 | 0 | 1 | 11 | 8 |
| 1991 | Malaysia | Group stage | 1st place, gold medalist(s) | 5 | 5 | 0 | 0 | 12 | 1 |
| 1995 | Malaysia | Final | 1st place, gold medalist(s) | 6 | 3 | 2 | 1 | 8 | 5 |
| 1996 | Malaysia | Group stage | 5th place | 6 | 2 | 0 | 4 | 11 | 14 |
| 2000 | Malaysia | Group stage | 3rd place, bronze medalist(s) | 7 | 4 | 0 | 3 | 14 | 11 |
| 2001 | Malaysia | Group stage | 5th place | 7 | 2 | 1 | 4 | 11 | 15 |
| 2004 | Malaysia | Group stage | 7th place | 6 | 0 | 1 | 5 | 10 | 19 |
| 2005 | Malaysia | Group stage | 5th place | 7 | 2 | 1 | 4 | 10 | 16 |
| 2006 | Malaysia | Semi-finals | 3rd place, bronze medalist(s) | 5 | 3 | 0 | 2 | 12 | 9 |
| 2007 | Malaysia | Semi-finals | 3rd place, bronze medalist(s) | 5 | 3 | 0 | 2 | 9 | 7 |
| 2008 | Malaysia | Final | 2nd place, silver medalist(s) | 7 | 4 | 0 | 3 | 18 | 18 |
| 2009 | Malaysia | Final | 1st place, gold medalist(s) | 5 | 3 | 2 | 0 | 12 | 6 |
| 2010 | Malaysia | Final | 1st place, gold medalist(s) | 6 | 4 | 1 | 1 | 21 | 14 |
| 2011 | Malaysia | Group stage | 6th place | 7 | 2 | 1 | 4 | 16 | 19 |
| 2012 | Malaysia | Group stage | 3rd place, bronze medalist(s) | 7 | 4 | 0 | 3 | 15 | 16 |
| 2013 | Malaysia | Group stage | 5th place | 6 | 2 | 1 | 3 | 13 | 13 |
| 2015 | Malaysia | Group stage | 3rd place, bronze medalist(s) | 6 | 2 | 2 | 2 | 16 | 14 |
| 2016 | Malaysia | Final | 2nd place, silver medalist(s) | 7 | 4 | 0 | 3 | 18 | 15 |
| 2017 | Malaysia | Group stage | 3rd place, bronze medalist(s) | 6 | 3 | 1 | 2 | 14 | 9 |
| 2018 | Malaysia | Group stage | 5th place | 6 | 2 | 1 | 3 | 16 | 13 |
| 2019 | Malaysia | Final | 2nd place, silver medalist(s) | 6 | 4 | 2 | 0 | 25 | 7 |
| 2025 | Malaysia | Final | 2nd place, silver medalist(s) | 6 | 4 | 0 | 2 | 24 | 12 |
| | Total | | 5 Titles | 138 | 66 | 18 | 54 | 326 | 269 |

==== South Asian Games ====
South Asian Games
| Year | Host | Round | Position | Pld | W | D | L | GF | GA |
|---|---|---|---|---|---|---|---|---|---|
| 1995 | Madras, India | Group stage | 1st place, gold medalist(s) | 4 | 4 | 0 | 0 | 32 | 2 |
| 2006 | Colombo, Sri Lanka | Final | 2nd place, silver medalist(s) | 4 | 3 | 0 | 1 | 17 | 4 |
| 2010 | Dhaka, Bangladesh | Final | 2nd place, silver medalist(s) | 5 | 3 | 2 | 0 | 37 | 7 |
| 2016 | Guwahati, India | Final | 2nd place, silver medalist(s) | 4 | 2 | 0 | 2 | 8 | 4 |
| 2027 | Pakistan | TBD | | | | | | | |
| | Total | | 1 title | 17 | 12 | 2 | 3 | 94 | 17 |

=== Defunct competitions ===
==== World League ====
Hockey World League
| Year | Host | Round | Position | Pld | W | D | L | GF | GA |
|---|---|---|---|---|---|---|---|---|---|
| 2012–13 | Rotterdam, Netherlands | Semifinal | 6th place | 6 | 1 | 2 | 3 | 16 | 18 |
| 2012–13 | New Delhi, India | Final | 6th place | 15 | 6 | 4 | 5 | 59 | 37 |
| 2014–15 | Antwerp, Belgium | Semifinal | 4th place | 7 | 3 | 1 | 3 | 14 | 21 |
| 2014–15 | Raipur, India | Final | 3rd place, bronze medalist(s) | 13 | 4 | 3 | 6 | 23 | 35 |
| 2016–17 | London, England | Semifinal | 6th place | 7 | 4 | 0 | 3 | 25 | 12 |
| 2016–17 | Bhubaneswar, India | Final | 3rd place, bronze medalist(s) | 13 | 5 | 2 | 6 | 33 | 23 |
| Total | | | Third place | 61 | 23 | 12 | 26 | 170 | 146 |

==== Champions Trophy ====
Champions Trophy
| Year | Host | Round | Position | Pld | W | D | L | GF | GA |
|---|---|---|---|---|---|---|---|---|---|
| 1980 | Karachi, Pakistan | Group stage | 5th place | 6 | 1 | 2 | 3 | 17 | 24 |
| 1982 | Amstelveen, Netherlands | Group stage | 3rd place, bronze medalist(s) | 5 | 3 | 0 | 2 | 16 | 20 |
| 1983 | Karachi, Pakistan | Group stage | 4th place | 5 | 2 | 1 | 2 | 8 | 9 |
| 1985 | Perth, Australia | Group stage | 6th place | 5 | 1 | 1 | 3 | 9 | 15 |
| 1986 | Karachi, Pakistan | Group stage | 5th place | 5 | 2 | 0 | 3 | 6 | 10 |
| 1989 | Berlin, West Germany | Group stage | 6th place | 5 | 1 | 0 | 4 | 7 | 12 |
| 1995 | Berlin, Germany | Group stage | 5th place | 6 | 0 | 3 | 3 | 7 | 13 |
| 1996 | Madras, India | Group stage | 4th place | 6 | 2 | 1 | 3 | 10 | 12 |
| 2002 | Cologne, Germany | Group stage | 4th place | 6 | 2 | 1 | 3 | 16 | 18 |
| 2003 | Amstelveen, Netherlands | Group stage | 4th place | 6 | 2 | 0 | 4 | 19 | 22 |
| 2004 | Lahore, Pakistan | Group stage | 4th Place | 6 | 1 | 1 | 4 | 11 | 16 |
| 2005 | Chennai, India | Group stage | 6th place | 6 | 1 | 0 | 5 | 9 | 15 |
| 2012 | Melbourne, Australia | Semi-finals | 4th place | 6 | 3 | 0 | 3 | 12 | 12 |
| 2014 | Bhubaneswar, India | Semi-finals | 4th place | 6 | 2 | 0 | 4 | 13 | 15 |
| 2016 | London, United Kingdom | Final | 2nd place, silver medalist(s) | 6 | 2 | 2 | 2 | 10 | 11 |
| 2018 | Breda, Netherlands | Final | 2nd place, silver medalist(s) | 6 | 2 | 3 | 1 | 11 | 7 |
| | Total | | Runners-up | 91 | 27 | 15 | 49 | 181 | 231 |

==== Champions Challenge ====
Champions Challenge
| Year | Host | Round | Position | Pld | W | D | L | GF | GA |
|---|---|---|---|---|---|---|---|---|---|
| 2001 | Kuala Lumpur, Malaysia | Final | 1st place, gold medalist(s) | 6 | 4 | 1 | 1 | 11 | 6 |
| 2007 | Boom, Belgium | Semi-finals | 3rd place, bronze medalist(s) | 6 | 4 | 0 | 2 | 16 | 13 |
| 2009 | Salta, Argentina | Semi-finals | 3rd place, bronze medalist(s) | 5 | 3 | 1 | 1 | 16 | 13 |
| 2011 | Johannesburg, South Africa | Final | 2nd place, silver medalist(s) | 6 | 4 | 1 | 1 | 29 | 17 |
| | Total | | 1 title | 23 | 15 | 3 | 5 | 72 | 49 |

==== Hockey Series ====
Hockey Series
| Year | Host | Round | Position | Pld | W | D | L | GF | GA |
|---|---|---|---|---|---|---|---|---|---|
| 2018–19 | Bhubaneshwar, India | Final | 1st place, gold medalist(s) | 5 | 5 | 0 | 0 | 35 | 4 |
| | Total | | 1 title | 5 | 5 | 0 | 0 | 35 | 4 |

==== Afro-Asian Games ====
Afro-Asian Games
| Year | Host | Round | Position | Pld | W | D | L | GF | GA |
|---|---|---|---|---|---|---|---|---|---|
| 2003 | Hyderabad, India | Final | 1st place, gold medalist(s) | 5 | 5 | 0 | 0 | 18 | 8 |
| | Total | | 1 title | 5 | 5 | 0 | 0 | 18 | 8 |

==== Western Asiatic Games ====
Western Asiatic Games
| Year | Host | Round | Position | Pld | W | D | L | GF | GA |
|---|---|---|---|---|---|---|---|---|---|
| 1934 (Note: The tournament was not sanctioned by the FIH, so the match played is not counted as official.) | (British Raj) Delhi, India | Final | 1st place, gold medalist(s) | 1 | 1 | 0 | 0 | 5 | 0 |
| | Total | | 1 title | 1 | 1 | 0 | 0 | 5 | 0 |

== Honours ==
=== Major tournaments ===
- Summer Olympics:
  - (gold) Gold medal: 1928, 1932, 1936, 1948, 1952, 1956, 1964, 1980
  - (silver) Silver medal: 1960
  - (bronze) Bronze medal: 1968, 1972, 2020, 2024
- World Cup:
  - (gold) Champions: 1975
  - (silver) Runners-up: 1973
  - (bronze) Third place: 1971
- Asian Games:
  - (gold) Gold medal: 1966, 1998, 2014, 2022, 2026
  - (silver) Silver medal: 1958, 1962, 1970, 1974, 1978, 1982, 1990, 1994, 2002
  - (bronze) Bronze medal: 1986, 2010, 2018
- Asia Cup:
  - (gold) Champions: 2003, 2007, 2017, 2025
  - (silver) Runners-up: 1982, 1985, 1989, 1994, 2013
  - (bronze) Third place: 1999, 2022
- Asian Champions Trophy:
  - (gold) Champions: 2011, 2016, 2018, 2023, 2024, 2026
  - (silver) Runners-up: 2012
  - (bronze) Third place: 2021
- Commonwealth Games:
  - (silver) Silver medal: 2010, 2014, 2022
- FIH Pro League:
  - (bronze) Third place: 2021–22

=== Other tournaments ===
- Sultan Azlan Shah Cup:
  - (gold) Champions: 1985, 1991, 1995, 2009, 2010
  - (silver) Runners-up: 2008, 2016, 2019, 2025
  - (bronze) Third place: 1983, 2000, 2006, 2007, 2012, 2015, 2017
- South Asian Games:
  - (gold) Gold medal: 1995
  - (silver) Silver medal: 2006, 2010, 2016

=== Defunct tournaments ===
- Hockey World league:
  - (bronze) Bronze medal: 2014–15, 2016–17
- Champions Trophy:
  - (silver) Silver medal: 2016, 2018
  - (bronze) Bronze medal: 1982
- Hockey Champions Challenge I:
  - (gold) Champions: 2001
  - (silver) Silver medal: 2011
  - (bronze) Bronze medal: 2007, 2009
- Hockey Series:
  - (gold) Champions: 2018–19
- Afro-Asian Games:
  - (gold) Gold medal: 2003
- Western Asiatic Games:
  - (gold) Gold medal: 1934 (Note: The tournament was not sanctioned by the FIH, so the match played is not counted as official.)

== Results and fixtures ==
Win Draw Loss Fixture

=== Past results ===
- 2021–24 results
- 2025 results

=== 2026 ===
All times are in IST (UTC+5:30).

| 11 February 2026 Pro League India leg | India | 1–3 | Belgium | Rourkela, India |
| 19:30 | Lakra 29' | Report | Onana 23'; Crols 53'; Van Dessel 57' | Stadium: Birsa Munda International Hockey Stadium |

| 12 February 2026 Pro League India leg | India | 0–8 | Argentina | Rourkela, India |
| 19:30 | | Report | Ruiz 14'; Domene 15', 20', 26', 60'; Mendez 22'; Ibarra 25' della Torre 30' | Stadium: Birsa Munda International Hockey Stadium |

| 14 February 2026 Pro League India leg | India | 2–4 | Belgium | Rourkela, India |
| 19:30 | Aditya 24'; Harmanpreet 37' | Report | Labouchere 11'; Hendrickx 14', 17'; Sloover 15' | Stadium: Birsa Munda International Hockey Stadium |

| 15 February 2026 Pro League India leg | India | 2–4 | Argentina | Rourkela, India |
| 19:30 | Aditya 50'; Sanjay 59' | Report | Domene 18'; Marcucci 28', 49'; Mendez 43' | Stadium: Birsa Munda International Hockey Stadium |

| 21 February 2026 Pro League Australia leg | India | 0–2 | Spain | Hobart, Australia |
| 12:00 | | Report | Abajo 6'; Cobos 36' | Stadium: Tasmanian Hockey Centre |

| 22 February 2026 Pro League Australia leg | Australia | 2–2 (5–4 p) | India | Hobart, Australia |
| 12:00 | Rintala 47', 56' | Report | Rohidas 15'; Jugraj 43' | Stadium: Tasmanian Hockey Centre |
| | Penalties |
| | Brand (penalty shoot-out scored); Henderson (penalty shoot-out scored); Howard (penalty shoot-out scored); Welch (penalty shoot-out scored); Craig (penalty shoot-out scored) | | (penalty shoot-out scored) Lakra; (penalty shoot-out scored) Maninder; (penalty shoot-out scored) Pal; (penalty shoot-out scored) Jugraj; (penalty shoot-out missed) Aditya |

| 24 February 2026 Pro League Australia leg | Spain | 1–1 (4–3 p) | India | Hobart, Australia |
| 14:00 | Font 59' | Report | Maninder 19' | Stadium: Tasmanian Hockey Centre |
| | Penalties |
| | Bonastre (penalty shoot-out scored); Recasens (penalty shoot-out scored); Cabre Verdiell (penalty shoot-out scored); Font (penalty shoot-out scored) | | (penalty shoot-out scored) Lakra; (penalty shoot-out scored) Maninder; (penalty shoot-out missed) Abhishek; (penalty shoot-out scored) Pal; (penalty shoot-out missed) Hardik |

| 25 February 2026 Pro League Australia leg | Australia | 1–1 (1–3 p) | India | Hobart, Australia |
| 14:00 | Hayward 49' | Report | Lakra 51' | Stadium: Tasmanian Hockey Centre |
| | Penalties |
| | Brand (penalty shoot-out missed); Henderson (penalty shoot-out missed); Burns (penalty shoot-out missed); Hayward (penalty shoot-out scored) | | (penalty shoot-out scored) Lakra; (penalty shoot-out scored) Maninder; (penalty shoot-out missed) Abhishek; (penalty shoot-out scored) Vishnukant |

| 14 June 2026 Pro League Netherlands leg | Netherlands | 3–2 | India | Rotterdam, Netherlands |
| 19:30 | Bukkens 3'; Bijen 23'; Reyenga 40' | Report | Dilpreet 10'; Sukhjeet 33' | Stadium: Hazelaarweg Stadion |

| 17 June 2026 Pro League Netherlands leg | India | 3–1 | Germany | Rotterdam, Netherlands |
| 23:00 | Mandeep 7'; Lakra 13'; Nilakanta 35' | Report | Hartkopf 45' | Stadium: Hazelaarweg Stadion |

| 18 June 2026 Pro League Netherlands leg | Germany | 2–1 | India | Rotterdam, Netherlands |
| 23:00 | Weigand 56'; Brilla 60' | Report | Jugraj 38' | Stadium: Hazelaarweg Stadion |

| 21 June 2026 Pro League Netherlands leg | Netherlands | 2–3 | India | Rotterdam, Netherlands |
| 17:30 | Heijden 19'; Bijen 59' | Report | Jugraj 18'; Abhishek 27'; Rajinder 56' | Stadium: Hazelaarweg Stadion |

| 23 June 2026 Pro League England leg | Pakistan | 3–4 | India | London, United Kingdom |
| 19:00 | Nadeem 8'; Mahmood 53'; Shakeel 60+' | Report | Abhishek 22'; Nilakanta 24'; Sukhjeet 40'; Rajinder 52' | Stadium: Lee Valley Hockey and Tennis Centre |

| 26 June 2026 Pro League England leg | England | 2–2 (4–1 p) | India | London, United Kingdom |
| 00:00 | Goodfield 29'; Bandurak 56' | Report | Dilpreet 10', 58' | Stadium: Lee Valley Hockey and Tennis Centre |
| | Penalties |
| | Sorsby (penalty shoot-out scored); Albery (penalty shoot-out scored); Wallace (penalty shoot-out scored); Wallace (penalty shoot-out scored) | | (penalty shoot-out scored) Harmanpreet; (penalty shoot-out missed) Sukhjeet; (penalty shoot-out missed) Vivek |

| 26 June 2026 Pro League England leg | India | 7–1 | Pakistan | London, United Kingdom |
| 22:30 | Sukhjeet 20'; Harmanpreet 26'; Hardik 34'; Jugraj 35'; Abhishek 41'; Pal 44'; Dilpreet 54' | Report | Mahmood 13' | Stadium: Lee Valley Hockey and Tennis Centre |

| 28 June 2026 Pro League England leg | England | 0–0 (2–3 p) | India | London, United Kingdom |
| 20:30 | | Report | | Stadium: Lee Valley Hockey and Tennis Centre |
| | Penalties |
| | Wallace (penalty shoot-out scored); Sorsby (penalty shoot-out missed); Croft (penalty shoot-out missed); Goodfield (penalty shoot-out scored); Waller (penalty shoot-out missed) | | (penalty shoot-out missed) Sukhjeet; (penalty shoot-out scored) Abhishek; (penalty shoot-out scored) Lakra; (penalty shoot-out scored) Hardik; (penalty shoot-out missed) Dilpreet |

| 15 August 2026 World Cup Pool D | India | 3–1 | Wales | Amstelveen, Netherlands |
| 16:30 | Sanjay 8'; Harmanpreet 11', 43' | Report | Welsh 56' | Stadium: Wagener Stadium |

| 17 August 2026 World Cup Pool D | India | 2–4 | England | Amstelveen, Netherlands |
| 18:30 | Harmanpreet 17'; Dilpreet 25' | Report | Bandurak 14', 55'; Rushmere 39'; Croft 43' | Stadium: Wagener Stadium |

| 19 August 2026 World Cup Pool D | Pakistan | 3–5 | India | Amstelveen, Netherlands |
| 18:30 | Shahid 22', 46'; Khan 24' | Report | Harmanpreet 5', 21'; Abhishek 11', 24'; Hardik 35' | Stadium: Wagener Stadium |

| 22 August 2026 World Cup Pool E | Netherlands | 3–1 | India | Amstelveen, Netherlands |
| 19:30 | Telgenkamp 41'; Hoedemakers 51'; Van Dam 55' | Report | Harmanpreet 52' | Stadium: Wagener Stadium |

| 24 August 2026 World Cup Pool E | Argentina | 5–3 | India | Amstelveen, Netherlands |
| 18:15 | J. Toscani 1' della Torre 6'; Domene 33', 45'; L. Toscani 53' | Report | Sukhjeet 10', 58'; Hardik 60' | Stadium: Wagener Stadium |

| 28 August 2026 World Cup 7th place match | India | 3–3 (3–4 p) | Belgium | Wavre, Belgium |
| 21:45 | Abhishek 6'; Harmanpreet 31', 60' | Report | Duvekot 22'; Labouchere 23' de Sloover 47' | Stadium: Belfius Hockey Arena |
| | Penalties |
| | Harmanpreet (penalty shoot-out missed); Sukhjeet (penalty shoot-out missed); Lakra (penalty shoot-out scored); Dilpreet (penalty shoot-out scored); Abhishek (penalty shoot-out scored) | | (penalty shoot-out scored) Boon; (penalty shoot-out missed) Foubert; (penalty shoot-out scored) de Sloover; (penalty shoot-out scored) Hendrickx; (penalty shoot-out scored) Duvekot |

| 20 September 2026 Asian Games Pool A | India | 13–1 | Indonesia | Kakamigahara, Japan |
| 11:30 | Shilanand 6', 35'; Abhishek 12'; Dilpreet 18', 19', 37', 49'; Rajinder 19'; Mandeep 21'; Harmanpreet 28'; Sukhjeet 38', 48'; Jugraj 46' | Report | Al Ardh 33' | Stadium: Gifu Prefectural Green Stadium |

| 22 September 2026 Asian Games Pool A | India | 16–1 | Sri Lanka | Kakamigahara, Japan |
| 15:30 | Mandeep 5'; Jugraj 10', 22', 42', 53'; Abhishek 11', 17', 49'; Harmanpreet 16', 45'; Sukhjeet 29'; Dilpreet 30', 38', 55'; Manpreet 31'; Prasad 36' | Report | Rathnayake 50' | Stadium: Gifu Prefectural Green Stadium |

| 24 September 2026 Asian Games Pool A | South Korea | 2–8 | India | Kakamigahara, Japan |
| 11:30 | Kim J. 42'; Kim Y. 52' | Report | Lakra 4'; Sukhjeet 10'; Harmanpreet 11'; Abhishek 15', 38'; Dilpreet 26', 32'; Rajinder 60' | Stadium: Gifu Prefectural Green Stadium |

| 26 September 2026 Asian Games Pool A | Japan | 0–2 | India | Kakamigahara, Japan |
| 13:30 | | Report | Abhishek 15'; Harmanpreet 40' | Stadium: Gifu Prefectural Green Stadium |

| 28 September 2026 Asian Games Pool A | India | 10–0 | Bangladesh | Kakamigahara, Japan |
| 16:00 | Abhishek 3'; Jugraj 22'; Harmanpreet 27', 40', 45'; Sukhjeet 32'; Lakra 44', 45'; Sanjay 59'; Mandeep 60' | Report | | Stadium: Gifu Prefectural Green Stadium |

| 1 October 2026 Asian Games Semi-final | India | 4–3 | Pakistan | Kakamigahara, Japan |
| 13:00 | Harmanpreet 5', 13'; Sukhjeet 23'; Abhishek 60' | Report | Mahmood 30'; Shahid 45'; Rana 49' | Stadium: Gifu Prefectural Green Stadium |

| 3 October 2026 Asian Games Gold medal match | India | 5–1 | Malaysia | Kakamigahara, Japan |
| 15:30 | Harmanpreet 11', 57'; Jugraj 23'; Hardik 42'; Lakra 54' | Report | Silverius 14' | Stadium: Gifu Prefectural Green Stadium |

| 27 October 2026 2026 ACT Group Stage | India | 13–0 | Bangladesh | Jalandhar, India |
| 19:00 | Harmanpreet 2', 44'; Mandeep 3', 10', 54'; Lakra 15'; Abhishek 18'; Nilakanta 26'; Dilpreet 43', 44'; Jugraj 46'; Hardik 60', 60' | Report | | Stadium: Surjit Hockey Stadium |

| 29 October 2026 2026 ACT Group Stage | India | 5–2 | China | Jalandhar, India |
| 19:00 | Sukhjeet 12', 34'; Harmanpreet 27', 31'; Jugraj 47' | Report | Yang 26'; Chen 36' | Stadium: Surjit Hockey Stadium |

| 30 October 2026 2026 ACT Group Stage | Japan | 1–4 | India | Jalandhar, India |
| 19:00 | Yamada 15' | Report | Abhishek 11', 51'; Harmanpreet 47'; Vishnukant 56' | Stadium: Surjit Hockey Stadium |

| 1 November 2026 2026 ACT Group Stage | Malaysia | 2–4 | India | Jalandhar, India |
| 19:00 | Anuar 25'; Silverius 60' | Report | Harmanpreet 3', 33', 58'; Sukhjeet 43' | Stadium: Surjit Hockey Stadium |

| 2 November 2026 2026 ACT Group Stage | India | 8–0 | South Korea | Jalandhar, India |
| 19:00 | Dilpreet 8', 40'; Jugraj 11'; Harmanpreet 15'; Lakra 33'; Sukhjeet 34'; Sanjay 36'; Angad 60' | Report | | Stadium: Surjit Hockey Stadium |

| 4 November 2026 2026 ACT Semi-final | India | 8–1 | South Korea | Mohali, India |
| 19:00 | Lakra 4', 13'; Harmanpreet 9'; Sukhjeet 21'; Dilpreet 21', 25'; Angad 36'; Prasad 54' | Report | Han 9' | Stadium: Olympian Balbir Singh Senior International Hockey Stadium |

| 5 November 2026 2026 ACT Gold medal match | India | 4–1 | Japan | Mohali, India |
| 19:00 | Lakra 42'; Dilpreet 48'; Jugraj 53'; Sukhjeet 54' | Report | Matsumoto 3' | Stadium: Olympian Balbir Singh Senior International Hockey Stadium |

| 19 November 2026 Indian Centenary Hockey Series Match 1 | New Zealand | 2–3 | India | Auckland, New Zealand |
| 11:00 | Elmes 25'; Hiha 55' | Report | Uttam 25'; Sharda Nand 38'; Sanjay 43' | Stadium: Lloyd Elsmore Park |

| 21 November 2026 Indian Centenary Hockey Series Match 2 | New Zealand | 2–2 | India | Auckland, New Zealand |
| 08:30 | Thomas 25'; Hiha 56' | Report | Angad 35'; Sanjay 57' | Stadium: Lloyd Elsmore Park |

| 22 November 2026 Indian Centenary Hockey Series Match 3 | New Zealand | 2–2 | India | Auckland, New Zealand |
| 06:30 | Thomas 9'; Culhane 55' | Report | Sanjay 16'; Karthi 18' | Stadium: Lloyd Elsmore Park |

=== 2027 ===
| 13 February 2027 Pro League India leg | India | v | Germany | TBD, India |
| 19:30 | | | | Stadium: TBD |

| 15 February 2027 Pro League India leg | India | v | Argentina | TBD, India |
| 19:30 | | | | Stadium: TBD |

| 16 February 2027 Pro League India leg | India | v | Germany | TBD, India |
| 19:30 | | | | Stadium: TBD |

| 18 February 2027 Pro League India leg | India | v | Argentina | TBD, India |
| 19:30 | | | | Stadium: TBD |

| 23 February 2027 Pro League India leg | India | v | Great Britain | TBD, India |
| 19:30 | | | | Stadium: TBD |

| 25 February 2027 Pro League India leg | India | v | Spain | TBD, India |
| 19:30 | | | | Stadium: TBD |

| 26 February 2027 Pro League India leg | India | v | Great Britain | TBD, India |
| 19:30 | | | | Stadium: TBD |

| 28 February 2027 Pro League India leg | India | v | Spain | TBD, India |
| 19:30 | | | | Stadium: TBD |

| 12 June 2027 Pro League Germany leg | India | v | France | Berlin, Germany |
| 17:00 | | | | Stadium: Ernst Reuter Sportfeld |

| 13 June 2027 Pro League Germany leg | France | v | India | Berlin, Germany |
| 16:00 | | | | Stadium: Ernst Reuter Sportfeld |

| 15 June 2027 Pro League Germany leg | Australia | v | India | Berlin, Germany |
| 19:00 | | | | Stadium: Ernst Reuter Sportfeld |

| 16 June 2027 Pro League Germany leg | India | v | Australia | Berlin, Germany |
| 19:00 | | | | Stadium: Ernst Reuter Sportfeld |

| 22 June 2027 Pro League Netherlands leg | Netherlands | v | India | 's-Hertogenbosch, Netherlands |
| 23:30 | | | | Stadium: HC 's-Hertogenbosch |

| 23 June 2027 Pro League Netherlands leg | Netherlands | v | India | 's-Hertogenbosch, Netherlands |
| 23:30 | | | | Stadium: HC 's-Hertogenbosch |

| 26 June 2027 Pro League Belgium leg | Belgium | v | India | Wavre, Belgium |
| 22:00 | | | | Stadium: Belfius Hockey Arena |

| 27 June 2027 Pro League Belgium leg | Belgium | v | India | Wavre, Belgium |
| 22:00 | | | | Stadium: Belfius Hockey Arena |

=== 2026 goalscorers ===
Goals updated as of 5 November 2026, after the match against Japan.

2026 goalscorers
| Rank | Player | FG | PC | PS | Total |
|---|---|---|---|---|---|
| 1 | Harmanpreet Singh | 0 | 31 | 1 | 32 |
| 2 | Dilpreet Singh | 20 | 1 | 0 | 21 |
| 3 | Abhishek | 18 | 0 | 0 | 18 |
| 4 | Sukhjeet Singh | 14 | 3 | 0 | 17 |
| 5 | Jugraj Singh | 1 | 11 | 3 | 15 |
| 6 | Shilanand Lakra | 8 | 5 | 0 | 13 |
| 7 | Mandeep Singh | 7 | 0 | 0 | 7 |
| 8 | Hardik Singh | 1 | 1 | 4 | 6 |
| 9 | Rajinder Singh | 1 | 3 | 0 | 8 |
| 9 | Sanjay | 1 | 2 | 1 | 8 |
| 11 | Nilakanta Sharma | 2 | 1 | 0 | 3 |
| 12 | Aditya Lalage | 2 | 0 | 0 | 6 |
| 12 | Vivek Prasad | 2 | 0 | 0 | 6 |
| 12 | Angad Bir Singh | 2 | 0 | 0 | 6 |
| 13 | Maninder Singh | 1 | 0 | 0 | 5 |
| 13 | Manpreet Singh | 1 | 0 | 0 | 5 |
| 13 | Vishnukant Singh | 1 | 0 | 0 | 5 |
| 13 | Amit Rohidas | 0 | 1 | 0 | 5 |
| 13 | Raj Kumar Pal | 0 | 1 | 0 | 5 |
| Total | | 83 | 60 | 9 | 152 |

== Team ==
=== Current squad ===
The following players competed in the 2026 Men's Asian Champions Trophy.

Caps and Goals updated as of 5 November 2026, after the match against Japan.

| No. | Pos. | Player | Date of birth (age) | Caps | Goals | Club |
|---|---|---|---|---|---|---|
| 77 | GK | Suraj Karkera | 14 October 1995 (age 31) | 109 | 0 | (India) Services |
| 12 | GK | Krishan Bahadur Pathak | 24 April 1997 (age 29) | 163 | 0 | (India) IOCL |
| 13 | DF | Harmanpreet Singh (Captain) | 6 January 1996 (age 30) | 284 | 250 | (India) Punjab Armed Police |
| 4 | DF | Jarmanpreet Singh | 18 July 1996 (age 30) | 178 | 8 | (India) Income Tax |
| 30 | DF | Amit Rohidas | 10 May 1993 (age 33) | 264 | 38 | (India) Railways |
| 31 | DF | Jugraj Singh | 11 December 1996 (age 29) | 122 | 45 | (India) Services |
| 70 | DF | Sanjay Rana | 5 May 2001 (age 25) | 110 | 12 | (India) Hockey Haryana |
| 38 | DF | Amandeep Lakra | 26 May 2002 (age 24) | 14 | 0 | (India) Railways |
| 8 | MF | Hardik Singh | 23 September 1998 (age 28) | 200 | 18 | (India) Punjab Civil Secretariat |
| 32 | MF | Vivek Prasad | 25 February 2000 (age 26) | 210 | 24 | (India) Madhya Pradesh Police |
| 78 | MF | Rajinder Singh | 22 December 2002 (age 23) | 62 | 7 | (India) Namdhari Sports Academy |
| 18 | MF | Nilakanta Sharma | 2 May 1995 (age 31) | 168 | 20 | (India) YAS Manipur ^{RET} |
| 19 | MF | Aditya Lalage | 15 January 2003 (age 23) | 26 | 3 | (India) Services |
| 40 | MF | Vishnukant Singh | 10 August 2002 (age 24) | 21 | 2 | (India) Uttar Pradesh Hockey |
| 11 | FW | Mandeep Singh | 25 January 1995 (age 31) | 305 | 131 | (India) Punjab Armed Police |
| 9 | FW | Dilpreet Singh | 12 November 1999 (age 27) | 142 | 61 | (India) Punjab Armed Police |
| 99 | FW | Shilanand Lakra | 5 May 1999 (age 27) | 88 | 24 | (India) BPCL |
| 34 | FW | Sukhjeet Singh | 5 December 1996 (age 29) | 144 | 55 | (India) Punjab National Bank |
| 5 | FW | Abhishek Nain | 15 August 1999 (age 27) | 151 | 69 | (India) Punjab National Bank |
| 37 | FW | Angad Bir Singh | 8 June 2002 (age 24) | 7 | 2 | (India) CAG |

=== Recent call-ups ===
The following players have also been called up for the national team in the last 12 months.

| Pos. | Player | Date of birth (age) | Caps | Goals | Club | Latest call-up |
|---|---|---|---|---|---|---|
| GK | Mohith H. S. | 27 February 2002 (age 24) | 27 | 0 | (India) Railways | 2026 Asian Games |
| GK | Pawan Malik | 1 May 2001 (age 25) | 18 | 0 | (India) CAG | 2025–26 FIH Pro League |
| DF | Sumit Walmiki | 20 December 1996 (age 29) | 192 | 8 | (India) ONGC | 2026 Asian Games |
| DF | Yashdeep Siwach | 26 December 2000 (age 25) | 37 | 0 | (India) Railways | 2026 Asian Games |
| DF | Nilam Sanjeep Xess | 7 November 1998 (age 28) | 66 | 6 | (India) CAG | 2025–26 FIH Pro League |
| DF | Poovanna Chandura Boby | 5 October 2002 (age 24) | 10 | 0 | State Bank of India | 2025–26 FIH Pro League |
| MF | Raj Kumar Pal | 1 May 1998 (age 28) | 99 | 9 | (India) CAG | 2026 Asian Games |
| MF | Manpreet Singh | 26 June 1992 (age 34) | 430 | 24 | (India) Punjab Armed Police | 2026 Asian Games ^{INJ} |
| MF | Rabichandra Singh Moirangthem | 3 August 2001 (age 25) | 27 | 0 | (India) Services | 2025–26 FIH Pro League |
| MF | Mohammed Raheel Mouseen | 20 December 1996 (age 29) | 22 | 2 | (India) CAG | 2025 South Africa Tour |
| FW | Karthi Selvam | 1 September 2001 (age 25) | 38 | 13 | (India) Income Tax | 2025–26 FIH Pro League |
| FW | Araijeet Singh Hundal | 21 January 2004 (age 22) | 27 | 5 | (India) Punjab and Sind Bank | 2025–26 FIH Pro League |
| FW | Maninder Singh | 4 February 2001 (age 25) | 9 | 2 | State Bank of India | 2025–26 FIH Pro League |
^{INJ} Withdrew due to injury^{PRE} Preliminary squad / standby^{RET} Retired from the national team^{WD} Player withdrew from the squad due to non-injury issue.

=== Coaching staff ===
| Position | Name |
|---|---|
| Head coach | (South Africa) Craig Fulton |
| Analytical coach | (Belgium) Michael Cosma |
| Coach | (India) Shivendra Singh |
| Scientific advisor | (Australia) Alan Tan |
| Head physiotherapist | (India) M. Ranganathan |
| Video analyst | (India) Harshith Lakshman |
| Masseur | (India) Arup Naskar |
| Strength and mental conditioning coach | (South Africa) Paddy Upton |
| Foreign chief analyst | (Belgium) Artur Lucas |

== Individual records ==
Players in bold are still active, at least at international level.

Caps and Goals updated as of 5 November 2026, after the match against Japan.

==== Top goal scorers ====
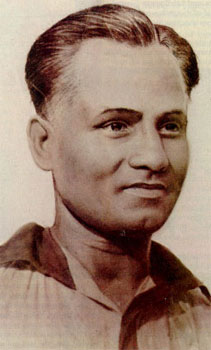
Dhyan Chand, credited with a record number of international field hockey goals

| Position | Player | Goals | Caps | References |
|---|---|---|---|---|
| 1 | Dhyan Chand | 570 | 185 | |
| 2 | **Harmanpreet Singh** | 250 | 284 | |
| 3 | Balbir Singh Sr. | 246 | 61 | |
| 4 | K. D. Singh | 175+ | 80+ | |
| 5 | Dhanraj Pillay | 170 | 339 | |
| 6 | Sandeep Singh | 138 | 186 | |
| 7 | VR Raghunath | 132 | 228 | |
| 8 | **Mandeep Singh** | 131 | 305 | |
| 9 | Rupinder Pal Singh | 125 | 223 | |
| 10 | Surinder Singh Sodhi | 120+ | 100+ | |
| 11 | Gagan Ajit Singh | 100+ | 200+ | |
| 12 | Baljit Singh Dhillon | 100 | 327 | |

==== Most caps ====
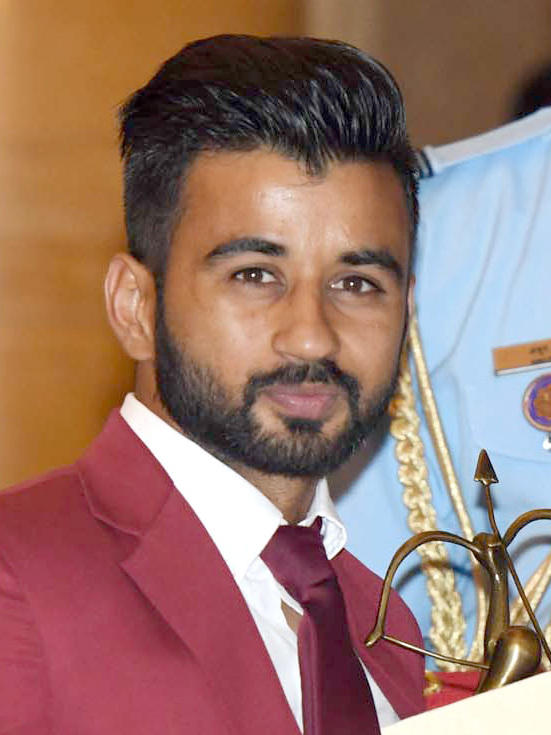
Manpreet Singh, India's most-capped men's international hockey player, with 430 appearances

| Position | Player | Caps |
|---|---|---|
| 1 | **Manpreet Singh** | 430 |
| 2 | Dilip Tirkey | 412 |
| 3 | Dhanraj Pillay | 339 |
| 4 | P. R. Sreejesh | 336 |
| 5 | Baljit Singh Dhillon | 327 |
| 6 | Sardara Singh | 314 |
| 7 | Pargat Singh | 313 |
| 8 | Mukesh Kumar | 307 |
| 9 | **Mandeep Singh** | 305 |
| 10 | Baljit Singh Saini | 304 |
| 11 | Vasudevan Bhaskaran | 287 |
| 12 | A. B. Subbaiah | 280 |
| 13 | **Harmanpreet Singh** | 284 |
| 14 | Ashish Ballal | 275 |
| 15 | S.V. Sunil | 264 |
| 16 | **Amit Rohidas** | 264 |
| 17 | Prabhjot Singh | 250 |
| 18 | Akashdeep Singh | 246 |
| 19 | V. R. Raghunath | 228 |
| 20 | Rupinder Pal Singh | 223 |

==== Players with most Olympic medals ====
| Position | Player | Medals | Appearances | References |
|---|---|---|---|---|
| 1 | Leslie Claudius | 4 | 1948, 1952, 1956, 1960 | |
| 2 | Udham Singh | 4 | 1952, 1956, 1960, 1964 | |
| 3 | Dhyan Chand | 3 | 1928, 1932, 1936 | |
| 4 | Balbir Singh Sr. | 3 | 1948, 1952, 1956 | |
| 5 | Richard Allen | 3 | 1928, 1932, 1936 | |
| 6 | Ranganathan Francis | 3 | 1948, 1952, 1956 | |
| 7 | Randhir Singh Gentle | 3 | 1948, 1952, 1956 | |
| 8 | Prithipal Singh | 3 | 1960, 1964, 1968 | |
| 9 | Shankar Laxman | 3 | 1956, 1960, 1964 | |
| 10 | Harbinder Singh | 3 | 1964, 1968, 1972 | |
| 11 | Haripal Kaushik | 2 | 1956, 1964 | |
| 12 | Surinder Singh Sodhi | 1 | 1980 | |

==== Notable players with most goals in Olympic caps ====
| Position | Player | Appearances | Goals |
|---|---|---|---|
| 1 | Dhyan Chand | 12 | 37 |
| 2 | Balbir Singh Sr. | 8 | 23 |
| 3 | Roop Singh Bais | 7 | 22 |
| 4 | Prithipal Singh | 24 | 22 |
| 5 | **Harmanpreet Singh** | 22 | 16 |
| 6 | Surinder Singh Sodhi | 6 | 15 |
| 7 | Udham Singh | 14 | 14 |

==== Top goal scorers for India in each Olympics ====
| Player | Goals | Year |
|---|---|---|
| Dhyan Chand | 14 | 1928 |
| Roop Singh Bais | 13 | 1932 |
| Dhyan Chand | 13 | 1936 |
| Balbir Singh Sr. Patrick Jansen | 8 | 1948 |
| Balbir Singh Sr. | 9 | 1952 |
| Udham Singh | 14 | 1956 |
| Raghbir Singh Bhola | 6 | 1960 |
| Prithipal Singh | 11 | 1964 |
| Prithipal Singh | 7 | 1968 |
| Mukhbain Singh | 9 | 1972 |
| Surjit Singh Randhawa | 4 | 1976 |
| Surinder Singh Sodhi | 15 | 1980 |
| Mervyn Fernandis; Vineet Sharma | 6 | 1984 |
| Mohinder Pal Singh | 5 | 1988 |
| Mukesh Kumar | 3 | 1992 |
| Ramandeep Singh; Gavin Ferreira | 3 | 1996 |
| Baljit Singh Dhillon; Dilip Tirkey | 3 | 2000 |
| Gagan Ajit Singh | 7 | 2004 |
| Sandeep Singh; Dharamvir Singh | 2 | 2012 |
| Rupinder Pal Singh | 3 | 2016 |
| **Harmanpreet Singh** | 6 | 2020 |
| **Harmanpreet Singh** | 10 | 2024 |

==== Most goals for India in World Cup ====
| Position | Player | Goals |
|---|---|---|
| 1 | **Harmanpreet Singh** | 14 |
| 2 | Rajinder Singh Sr. | 12 |
| 3 | Surjit Singh Randhawa | 11 |
| 4 | Akashdeep Singh | 10 |
| 5 | Surinder Singh Sodhi | 8 |
| 6 | Shivendra Singh | 7 |
| 6 | Mukesh Kumar | 7 |

==== Top scorers for India in World Cup by year ====
| Position | Player | Goals | Year |
|---|---|---|---|
| 1 | Rajinder Singh Sr. | **12** | 1982 |
| 2 | **Harmanpreet Singh** | **8** | 2026 |
| 3 | Surjit Singh Randhawa | **6** | 1973 |
| 4 | Akashdeep Singh | **5** | 2014 |
| 5 | Mohinder Singh | **4** | 1975 |

==== Most goals in a World Cup match ====
| Position | Player | Goals | Match |
|---|---|---|---|
| 1 | Mohinder Singh | **3** | (India) 7–0 (Ghana) 1975 |
| 1 | Rajinder Singh Sr. | **3** | (India) 6–2 (Malaysia) 1982 |
| 1 | Mukesh Kumar | **3** | (India) 6–2 (Poland) 1998 |

==== Top scorers for India in Commonwealth Games ====
| Position | Player | Goals |
|---|---|---|
| 1 | **Harmanpreet Singh** | 15 |
| 2 | Sandeep Singh | 11 |
| 3 | Rupinder Pal Singh; Mandeep Singh | 7 |
| 4 | Baljit Singh Dhillon | 6 |
| 5 | Dhanraj Pillay | 5 |
| 6 | Dharamvir Singh; Sarvanjit Singh; Lakshmanan Prabhakaran; V. R. Raghunath | 4 |

== Head-to-head record ==
| Won more matches than lost |
| All matches drawn |
| Won equal matches to lost |
| Lost more matches than won |

=== Overall record ===
Record last updated as of the following match:

India vs Japan at Olympian Balbir Singh Senior International Hockey Stadium, Mohali in the 2026 Men's Asian Champions Trophy, 5 November 2026

| Opponent | GP | W | D | L | Win % | Last meeting |
|---|---|---|---|---|---|---|
| Afghanistan | 1 | 1 | 0 | 0 | 100% | 1956 |
| Argentina | 67 | 35 | 7 | 25 | 52.24% | 2026 |
| Australia | 149 | 25 | 25 | 99 | 16.78% | 2026 |
| Austria | 5 | 5 | 0 | 0 | 100% | 2017 |
| Bangladesh | 22 | 21 | 1 | 0 | 95.45% | 2026 |
| Belarus | 1 | 1 | 0 | 0 | 100% | 1996 |
| Belgium | 99 | 52 | 16 | 31 | 52.53% | 2026 |
| Canada | 22 | 17 | 1 | 4 | 77.27% | 2025 |
| Chile | 2 | 2 | 0 | 0 | 100% | 2008 |
| China | 27 | 21 | 3 | 3 | 77.77% | 2026 |
| Chinese Taipei | 1 | 1 | 0 | 0 | 100% | 2006 |
| Cuba | 2 | 2 | 0 | 0 | 100% | 2002 |
| Denmark | 2 | 2 | 0 | 0 | 100% | 1960 |
| Egypt | 7 | 5 | 2 | 0 | 71.43% | 2010 |
| England | 140 | 26 | 26 | 88 | 18.57% | 2026 |
| Fiji | 1 | 1 | 0 | 0 | 100% | 2013 |
| France | 17 | 12 | 3 | 2 | 70.59% | 2024 |
| Ghana | 2 | 2 | 0 | 0 | 100% | 2022 |
| Germany | 115 | 29 | 27 | 59 | 25.22% | 2026 |
| Great Britain | 29 | 9 | 6 | 14 | 31.03% | 2024 |
| Hong Kong | 10 | 10 | 0 | 0 | 100% | 2018 |
| Hungary | 1 | 1 | 0 | 0 | 100% | 1936 |
| Indonesia | 3 | 3 | 0 | 0 | 100% | 2026 |
| Ireland | 11 | 9 | 1 | 1 | 81.82% | 2025 |
| Iran | 1 | 1 | 0 | 0 | 100% | 1974 |
| Italy | 2 | 2 | 0 | 0 | 100% | 2012 |
| Japan | 100 | 89 | 5 | 6 | 89.00% | 2026 |
| Kazakhstan | 2 | 1 | 1 | 0 | 50% | 2025 |
| Kenya | 4 | 4 | 0 | 0 | 100% | 1973 |
| Malaysia | 129 | 91 | 21 | 17 | 70.54% | 2026 |
| Nepal | 2 | 2 | 0 | 0 | 100% | 2010 |
| Mexico | 3 | 3 | 0 | 0 | 100% | 2008 |
| Netherlands | 122 | 36 | 29 | 57 | 29.51% | 2026 |
| New Zealand | 107 | 60 | 18 | 29 | 56.07% | 2025 |
| Nigeria | 1 | 1 | 0 | 0 | 100% | 2003 |
| Oman | 8 | 8 | 0 | 0 | 100% | 2018 |
| Pakistan | 185 | 71 | 32 | 82 | 38.38% | 2026 |
| Poland | 16 | 10 | 4 | 2 | 62.5% | 2019 |
| Russia | 4 | 4 | 0 | 0 | 100% | 2019 |
| Scotland | 3 | 3 | 0 | 0 | 100% | 2017 |
| Singapore | 6 | 6 | 0 | 0 | 100% | 2023 |
| South Africa | 50 | 32 | 10 | 8 | 64% | 2025 |
| South Korea | 67 | 43 | 13 | 11 | 64.18% | 2026 |
| Soviet Union | 7 | 4 | 1 | 2 | 57.14% | 1991 |
| Spain | 76 | 33 | 15 | 28 | 43.4% | 2026 |
| Sri Lanka | 14 | 14 | 0 | 0 | 100% | 2026 |
| Switzerland | 2 | 2 | 0 | 0 | 100% | 1991 |
| Tanzania | 1 | 1 | 0 | 0 | 100% | 1980 |
| Thailand | 2 | 2 | 0 | 0 | 100% | 2007 |
| Trinidad and Tobago | 2 | 2 | 0 | 0 | 100% | 2006 |
| United States | 6 | 6 | 0 | 0 | 100% | 1996 |
| Uzbekistan | 2 | 2 | 0 | 0 | 100% | 2023 |
| Wales | 7 | 7 | 0 | 0 | 100% | 2026 |
| Total | 1667 | 832 | 267 | 568 | 49.91% | 2026 |

=== Olympic Games ===
Record last updated as of the following match:

India vs Spain at Stade Yves-du-Manoir, Paris in the 2024 Olympics, 8 August 2024

| Opponent | GP | W | D | L | Win % | Last meeting |
|---|---|---|---|---|---|---|
| Afghanistan | 1 | 1 | 0 | 0 | 100% | 1956 |
| Argentina | 11 | 7 | 3 | 1 | 63.64% | 2024 |
| Australia | 12 | 4 | 2 | 6 | 33.33% | 2024 |
| Austria | 3 | 3 | 0 | 0 | 100% | 1952 |
| Belgium | 7 | 3 | 0 | 4 | 42.86% | 2024 |
| Canada | 4 | 3 | 1 | 0 | 75% | 2016 |
| Cuba | 1 | 1 | 0 | 0 | 100% | 1980 |
| Denmark | 2 | 2 | 0 | 0 | 100% | 1960 |
| Egypt | 1 | 1 | 0 | 0 | 100% | 1992 |
| France | 1 | 1 | 0 | 0 | 100% | 1936 |
| East Germany | 1 | 1 | 0 | 0 | 100% | 1968 |
| United Team of Germany | 2 | 1 | 1 | 0 | 50% | 1964 |
| West Germany | 5 | 2 | 2 | 1 | 40% | 1988 |
| Germany | 7 | 2 | 1 | 4 | 28.57% | 2024 |
| Great Britain | 10 | 5 | 1 | 4 | 50% | 2024 |
| Hong Kong | 1 | 1 | 0 | 0 | 100% | 1964 |
| Hungary | 1 | 1 | 0 | 0 | 100% | 1936 |
| Ireland | 2 | 2 | 0 | 0 | 100% | 2024 |
| Japan | 4 | 4 | 0 | 0 | 100% | 2021 |
| Kenya | 1 | 1 | 0 | 0 | 100% | 1972 |
| Malaysia | 4 | 4 | 0 | 0 | 100% | 1984 |
| Mexico | 2 | 2 | 0 | 0 | 100% | 1972 |
| Netherlands | 12 | 7 | 1 | 4 | 58.33% | 2016 |
| New Zealand | 9 | 6 | 0 | 3 | 66.67% | 2024 |
| Pakistan | 7 | 2 | 1 | 4 | 28.57% | 2004 |
| Poland | 3 | 0 | 3 | 0 | 0% | 2000 |
| Singapore | 1 | 1 | 0 | 0 | 100% | 1956 |
| South Africa | 2 | 1 | 0 | 1 | 50% | 2012 |
| South Korea | 5 | 2 | 1 | 2 | 40% | 2012 |
| Soviet Union | 2 | 1 | 0 | 1 | 50% | 1988 |
| Spain | 11 | 8 | 2 | 1 | 72.73% | 2024 |
| Switzerland | 1 | 1 | 0 | 0 | 100% | 1928 |
| Tanzania | 1 | 1 | 0 | 0 | 100% | 1980 |
| United States | 5 | 5 | 0 | 0 | 100% | 1996 |

=== World Cup ===
Record last updated as of the following match:

India vs Belgium at Belfius Hockey Arena, Wavre in the 2026 World Cup, 28 August 2026

| Opponent | GP | W | D | L | Win % | Last meeting |
|---|---|---|---|---|---|---|
| Argentina | 9 | 2 | 1 | 6 | 22.22% | 2026 |
| Australia | 8 | 1 | 1 | 6 | 12.5% | 2014 |
| Belgium | 5 | 2 | 2 | 1 | 40% | 2026 |
| Canada | 5 | 3 | 0 | 2 | 60% | 2018 |
| Cuba | 1 | 1 | 0 | 0 | 100% | 2002 |
| England | 10 | 3 | 2 | 5 | 30% | 2026 |
| France | 2 | 1 | 0 | 1 | 50% | 1990 |
| West Germany | 5 | 2 | 2 | 1 | 40% | 1986 |
| Germany | 3 | 0 | 0 | 3 | 0% | 2006 |
| Ghana | 1 | 1 | 0 | 0 | 100% | 1975 |
| Japan | 3 | 2 | 1 | 0 | 66.67% | 2023 |
| Kenya | 3 | 3 | 0 | 0 | 100% | 1973 |
| Malaysia | 4 | 3 | 0 | 1 | 75% | 2014 |
| Netherlands | 8 | 0 | 1 | 7 | 0% | 2026 |
| New Zealand | 7 | 3 | 2 | 2 | 42.86% | 2023 |
| Pakistan | 6 | 4 | 0 | 2 | 66.67% | 2026 |
| Poland | 4 | 3 | 0 | 1 | 75% | 2002 |
| South Africa | 6 | 3 | 3 | 0 | 50% | 2023 |
| South Korea | 5 | 2 | 0 | 3 | 40% | 2014 |
| Soviet Union | 3 | 2 | 1 | 0 | 66.67% | 1990 |
| Spain | 7 | 3 | 1 | 3 | 42.86% | 2023 |
| Wales | 2 | 2 | 0 | 0 | 100% | 2026 |

== Medal matches ==
=== Olympic Games ===
==== 1928 gold medal match ====
26 May 1928
15:45

| (gold) India | 3–0 | Netherlands (silver) |
|---|---|---|
| Chand 15', 36'; Marthins | Report |

Olympisch Stadion, Amsterdam
Attendance: 40,000
Umpires:
W. Simon (GER)
R. Liégeois (BEL)

==== 1936 gold medal match ====
15 August 1936
11:00

| (gold) India | 8–1 | Germany (silver) |
|---|---|---|
| Singh 33'; Tapsell 42'; Chand 44', 47', 70'; Jaffar 52'; Dara 62', 63' | Report | Weiß 51' |

Hockey Olympic Stadium, Berlin
Umpires:
Robert Liégeois (BEL)
Theo van 't Lam (NED)

==== 1948 gold medal match ====
12 August 1948
18:00

| (silver) Great Britain | 0–4 | India (gold) |
|---|---|---|
| | Report | Singh Sr. 3', 55'; Jansen 10'; T. Singh 66' |

Empire Stadium, London
Umpires:
Rogge (NED)
René Lombaert (BEL)

==== 1952 gold medal match ====
24 July 1952
17:00

| (gold) India | 6–1 | Netherlands (silver) |
|---|---|---|
| Singh Sr. 14', 16', 34', 43', 65'; KD Singh 25' | Report | Esser 55' |

Helsinki Velodrome, Helsinki
Umpires:
A.L. Allen (GBR)
K.H. Ingledew (GBR)

==== 1956 gold medal match ====
6 December 1956

| (gold) India | 1–0 | Pakistan (silver) |
|---|---|---|
| Gentle 38' | Report |

Melbourne Cricket Ground, Melbourne
Attendance: 10,000
Umpires:
M. G. Cowlinshaw (GBR)
J. McDowell (AUS)

==== 1960 gold medal match ====
9 September 1960
15:30

| (gold) Pakistan | 1–0 | India (silver) |
|---|---|---|
| Bunda 11' | Report |

Olympic Velodrome, Rome
Umpires:
MacDowell (AUS)
Massart (BEL)

==== 1964 gold medal match ====
23 October 1964
14:20

| (silver) Pakistan | 0–1 | India (gold) |
|---|---|---|
| | Report | Mohinder 40' |

Komazawa Hockey Field, Tokyo
Umpires:
Walter Schinner (GER)
A. Fransois Lathouwers (NED)

==== 1968 bronze medal match ====
26 October 1968

| (bronze) India | 2–1 | West Germany |
|---|---|---|
| Prithipal Singh 55'; Balbir Singh 63' | Report | Schuler 34' |

Municipal Stadium, Mexico City

==== 1972 bronze medal match ====
10 September 1972
10:00

| Netherlands | 1–2 | India (bronze) |
|---|---|---|
| Kruize 6' | Report | Billimoga 15'; Mukhbain 70' |

Hockeyanlage, Munich
Umpires:
Osvaldo Pensosi (ITA)
Bernard Valette (FRA)

==== 1980 gold medal match ====
29 July 1980
17:00

| (gold) India | 4–3 | Spain (silver) |
|---|---|---|
| S. Singh 24', 30'; Kaushik 42'; Shahid 58' | Report | Amat 53', 54', 65' |

Minor Arena, Dynamo Stadium, Moscow

==== 2020 bronze medal match ====
5 August 2021
10:30

| Germany | 4–5 | India (bronze) |
|---|---|---|
| Oruz 2'; Wellen 24'; Fürk 25'; Windfeder 48' | Report | Simranjeet 17', 34'; Hardik 27'; Harmanpreet 29'; Rupinder 31' |

Oi Hockey Stadium, Tokyo
Umpires:
Adam Kearns (AUS)
Simon Taylor (NZL)

==== 2024 bronze medal match ====
8 August 2024
14:00

| (bronze) India | 2–1 | Spain |
|---|---|---|
| Harmanpreet 30', 33' | Report | Miralles 18' |

Stade Yves-du-Manoir, Paris
Umpires:
Coen van Bunge (NED)
Ben Göntgen (GER)

=== World Cup ===
==== 1971 third and fourth place ====
24 October 1971
12:30

| (bronze) India | 2–1 (a.e.t.) | Kenya |
|---|---|---|
| R. Singh; Ganesh 89' | Report | Sohal |

Real Club de Polo, Barcelona

==== 1973 final ====
2 September 1973

| (gold) Netherlands | 2–2 (a.e.t.) | India (silver) |
|---|---|---|
| Kruize 2 goals' | Report | Surjit 2 goals' |
Penalties
| | 4–2 |

Wagener Stadium, Amstelveen

==== 1975 final ====
15 March 1975
15:00

| (gold) India | 2–1 | Pakistan (silver) |
|---|---|---|
| S. Singh 44'; Kumar 51' | Report | Zahid 17' |

Stadium Merdeka, Kuala Lumpur
Attendance: 35,000—50,000
Umpires:
G. Vijayanathan (MAS)
A. Renaud (FRA)

== Notable former players ==
- Len Aiyappa
- Richard Allen
- Vasudevan Baskaran
- Raghbir Singh Bhola
- Dhyan Chand
- Devesh Chauhan
- Bharat Chettri
- Leslie Claudius
- Baljit Singh Dhillon
- Adrian D'Souza
- Merwyn Fernandes
- Peter Fernandes
- Joseph Galibardy
- M. P. Ganesh
- Marcellus Gomes
- Earnest Goodsir-Cullen
- William Goodsir-Cullen
- B. P. Govinda
- Arjun Halappa
- Zafar Iqbal
- Aslam Sher Khan
- Ghulam Moinuddin Khanji
- Balbir Singh Kullar
- Ashok Kumar
- Mukesh Kumar
- Bimal Lakra
- Shankar Lakshman
- Kishan Lal
- Jude Menezes
- Cyril Michie
- Danish Mujtaba
- Jaipal Singh Munda
- Baboo Nimal
- Hiranna M. Nimal
- Dhanraj Pillay
- Viren Rasquinha
- Mohammed Riaz
- Jalaluddin Rizvi
- Mohammed Shahid
- Jaman Lal Sharma
- Adam Sinclair
- Ajit Pal Singh
- Balbir Singh, Sr.
- Charanjit Singh
- Davinder Singh
- Gagan Ajit Singh
- Gurjinder Singh
- Harbinder Singh
- Harmik Singh
- Jagbir Singh
- Jugraj Singh
- K. D. Singh
- Mohinder Singh
- Mohinder Pal Singh
- Mukhbain Singh
- Pargat Singh
- Prabhjot Singh
- Prithipal Singh
- Rajinder Singh Sr.
- Rajpal Singh
- Ramandeep Singh
- Roop Singh
- Rupinder Pal Singh
- Sandeep Singh
- Sardara Singh
- Satbir Singh
- Surjit Singh
- Thoiba Singh
- Udham Singh
- Surinder Singh Sodhi
- M. M. Somaya
- P. R. Sreejesh
- Nilakanta Sharma
- S. V. Sunil
- Deepak Thakur
- Dilip Tirkey
- Ignace Tirkey

== See also ==
Indian national hockey teams
| Men's | | | | | Women's | | | | |
|---|---|---|---|---|---|---|---|---|---|
| Senior | Under-21 | Under-18 | Senior Hockey5s | Under-18 hockey5s | Senior | Under-21 | Under-18 | Senior Hockey5s | Under-18 hockey5s |

- Field hockey in India
- India national para hockey team
- List of Indian field hockey captains in Olympics
- List of men's field hockey players with 100 or more international goals
- India–Pakistan field hockey rivalry
- India–Malaysia field hockey record
