= Field hockey at the 2016 South Asian Games – Women =

Field Hockey at the 2016 South Asian Games – Women

Tournament details
- Host country: India
- City: Guwahati
- Dates: 10–15 February 2016
- Teams: 3
- Venue: 1

Final positions
- Champions: India (1st title)
- Runner-up: Sri Lanka
- Third place: Nepal

Tournament statistics
- Matches played: 4
- Goals scored: 62 (15.5 per match)
- Top scorer: (India) Jaspreet Kaur (9 goals)

Field hockey at the 2016 South Asian Games for women was held in Maulana Md. Tayabullah Hockey Stadium, in Guwahati, India from 10 to 15 February 2016. This was the first ever women's field hockey tournament in the South Asian Games.

India won the gold medal by defeating Sri Lanka by 10–0.

== Results ==
Pos	Team	Pld	W	D	L	GF	GA	GD	Pts	Qualification
1	India	2	2	0	0	36	1	+35	6	Advance to Gold-medal match
2	Sri Lanka	2	1	0	1	16	12	+4	3	Advance to Gold-medal match
3	Nepal	2	0	0	2	0	39	−39	0	Bronze Medal

Source: FIH
Rules for classification: 1) points; 2) goal difference; 3) goals scored; 4) head-to-head result.

=== Fixtures and results ===
All times are Indian Standard Time (IST) – UTC+05:30.

7 February 2016
15:00

India	24−0	Nepal
Rani 2', 46', 58'; Jaspreet Kaur 4', 35', 56'; Punam Barla 7', 42', 43', 51'; Neha Goyal 14', 22', 70'; Yendala Soundarya 15', 52', 62', 64'; Gurjit Kaur 21', 41'; Preeti Dubey 23', 29'; Deepika 53', 62', 67'	Report

Maulana Md. Tayabullah Hockey Stadium
Umpires:
(Japan) Junko Wagatsuma
(Pakistan) Binish Hayat
(India) Rama Potnis (Reserve Umpire)

8 February 2016
15:00

Sri Lanka	1−12	India
Nayana Jayaneththi 58'	Report	4' Rani; 8', 32', 38', 42', 57' Jaspreet Kaur; 13' Sonika; 14', 27' Yendala Soundarya; 19' 62' Jyoti Gupta; 24' Punam Barla; 47' Deepika; 65' Gurjit Kaur

Maulana Md. Tayabullah Hockey Stadium
Umpires:
(Japan) Junko Wagatsuma
(Pakistan) Binish Hayat
(India) Rama Potnis (Reserve Umpire)

8 February 2016
17:00

Nepal	0−15	Sri Lanka
	Report	7', 46', 51', 56' Nayana Jayaneththi; 8', 32', 52', 69', 69' Chathurika Wijesooriya; 19', 58', 68' Mudiyansalage Weerabahu; 28' Chathurika Themiyadasa; 41' Buddika Kumari; 48' Madhura Rathepitiya

Maulana Md. Tayabullah Hockey Stadium
Umpires:
(India) Rama Potnis
(Pakistan) Binish Hayat
(Japan) Junko Wagatsuma (Reserve Umpire)

==== Gold-medal match ====
11 February 2016
20:00

(gold) India	10−0	Sri Lanka (silver)
Rani 2', 4', 56'; Preeti Dubey 8'; Yendala Soundarya 21', 64'; Punam Barla 29' 47'; Deepika 31'; Ritu Rani 47'; Jaspreet Kaur 68'	Report	34' Nayana Jayaneththi

Maulana Md. Tayabullah Hockey Stadium
Umpires:
(Japan) Junko Wagatsuma
(Pakistan) Binish Hayat
(India) Rama Potnis (Reserve Umpire)

== Winner ==
Women's Field Hockey at the 2016 South Asian Games

India
First title

== Statistics ==
=== Goal Scorers ===
Player	Team	Goals			
Player	Team	FG	PC	PS	Total
Jaspreet Kaur	India	1	7	1	9
Yendala Soundarya	India	6	2	0	8
Rani	India	7	0	0	7
Punam Barla	India	4	1	0	5
Deepika	India	4	1	0	5
Nayana Jayaneththi	Sri Lanka	4	1	0	5
Chathurika Wijesooriya	Sri Lanka	4	1	0	5
Preeti Dubey	India	3	0	0	3
Neha Goyal	India	2	1	0	3
Gurjit Kaur	India	0	3	0	3
Mudiyansalage Weerabahu	Sri Lanka	3	0	0	3
Jyoti Gupta	India	1	0	0	1
Buddika Kumari	Sri Lanka	1	0	0	1
Ritu Rani	India	0	1	0	1
Madhura Rathepitiya	Sri Lanka	1	0	0	1
Sonika	India	1	0	0	1
Chathurika Themiyadasa	Sri Lanka	0	1	0	1
Total		42	19	1	62

Source: "Scorers".

=== Cards ===
#	Player	Team			
06	Punam Barla	India	0	0	2
22	Jyoti Gupta	India	0	0	1
10	Nayana Jayaneththi	Sri Lanka	0	1	0
Total			0	1	3

Source: "Cards".

== Officials ==
*All officials were appointed by Asian Hockey Federation.
Source: "Officials".

Tournament Director

- (Malaysia) Daljit Singh

Technical Officer

- (India) Rakesh Bhatia
- (Sri Lanka) Halinge Mithripala
- (Pakistan) Uzma Rizvi

Judge

- (Bangladesh) Hassan Mohd Ali
- (India) Rohini Bopanna
- (Pakistan) Mohd Ahsan Jaleel
- (India) Faheem Mohd Khan
- (Sri Lanka) M. Fazeer Laheer
- (Nepal) Balaram Shresta

Umpires Manager

- (Malaysia) Amarjit Singh

Neutral Umpire

- (Pakistan) Binish Hayat
- (Japan) Junko Wagatsuma
- (India) Rama Potnis

== See also ==
- Field hockey at the 2016 South Asian Games – Men
