= Field hockey at the 2016 South Asian Games – Men =

Field Hockey at the 2016 South Asian Games – Men

Tournament details
- Host country: India
- City: Guwahati
- Dates: 07–12 February 2016
- Teams: 4
- Venue: 1

Final positions
- Champions: Pakistan (3rd title)
- Runner-up: India
- Third place: Bangladesh

Tournament statistics
- Matches played: 8
- Goals scored: 28 (3.5 per match)
- Top scorer: (Pakistan) Arslan Qadir (4 goals)

Field hockey at the 2016 South Asian Games was the fourth edition of Field hockey at the South Asian Games for men, held in Maulana Md. Tayabullah Hockey Stadium, Guwahati, India from 7 to 12 February 2016.

== Pool Standings ==
Pos	Team	Pld	W	D	L	GF	GA	GD	Pts	Qualification
1	Pakistan	3	3	0	0	11	1	+10	9	Advance to Gold-medal match
2	India	3	2	0	1	8	3	+5	6	Advance to Gold-medal match
3	Bangladesh	3	1	0	2	3	10	−7	3	Bronze Medal
4	Sri Lanka	3	0	0	3	0	8	−8	0	Bronze Medal

Source: FIH
Rules for classification: 1) points; 2) goal difference; 3) goals scored; 4) head-to-head result.

=== Fixtures and results ===
All times are Indian Standard Time (IST) – UTC+05:30.

7 February 2016
17:30

Pakistan	3−0	Sri Lanka
Abbas 12'; Bilal 19'; Qadir 50'	Report

Maulana Md. Tayabullah Hockey Stadium
Umpires:
(Malaysia) Ilanggo Kanabathu
(Bangladesh) Salim Lucky
(India) Napoleon Chanamthabam (Reserve Umpire)

7 February 2016
20:00

India	4−1	Bangladesh
Somanna 10'; Gaganpreet 27'; Xess 30'; Umar 69'	Report	Hossain 42'

Maulana Md. Tayabullah Hockey Stadium
Umpires:
(Malaysia) Iskandar Rusli
(Sri Lanka) Dayan Dissanayake
(Malaysia) Ilanggo Kanabathu (Reserve Umpire)

8 February 2016
17:30

Bangladesh	2−0	Sri Lanka
Mahmud 11'; Rahman 38'	Report

Maulana Md. Tayabullah Hockey Stadium
Umpires:
(India) Napoleon Chanamthabam
(Malaysia) Ilanggo Kanabathu
(Malaysia) Iskandar Rusli (Reserve Umpire)

8 February 2016
20:00

Pakistan	2−1	India
Qadir 11', 37'	Report	Antil 53'

Maulana Md. Tayabullah Hockey Stadium
Umpires:
(Bangladesh) Salim Lucky
(Malaysia) Iskandar Rusli
(Sri Lanka) Dayan Dissanayake (Reserve Umpire)

10 February 2016
17:30

Bangladesh	0−6	Pakistan
	Report	Bhutta 2'; Bilal 7'; Qadir 34'; Rehman 43', 65'; Abbas 58'

Maulana Md. Tayabullah Hockey Stadium
Umpires:
(India) Napoleon Chanamthabam
(Sri Lanka) Dayan Dissanayake
(Malaysia) Iskandar Rusli (Reserve Umpire)

10 February 2016
20:00

India	3–0	Sri Lanka
Gagandeep 11'; Gaganpreet 34', 64'	Report

Maulana Md. Tayabullah Hockey Stadium
Umpires:
(Malaysia) Iskandar Rusli
(Malaysia) Ilanggo Kanabathu
(Bangladesh) Salim Lucky (Reserve Umpire)

==== Bronze-medal match ====
12 February 2016
17:30

Sri Lanka	1–4	Bangladesh (bronze)
Dharmarathna 46'	Report	Islam 18'; Khisa 24'; Das 55'; Rahman 69'

Maulana Md. Tayabullah Hockey Stadium
Umpires:
(Malaysia) Iskandar Rusli
(India) Napoleon Chanamthabam
(Malaysia) Ilanggo Kanabathu (Reserve Umpire)

==== Gold-medal match ====
12 February 2016
20:00

(silver) India	0–1	Pakistan (gold)
	Report	Rehman 35'

Maulana Md. Tayabullah Hockey Stadium
Umpires:
(Malaysia) Ilanggo Kanabathu
(Bangladesh) Salim Lucky
(Sri Lanka) Dayan Dissanayake (Reserve Umpire)

== Winner ==
Men's Field Hockey at the 2016 South Asian Games

Pakistan
Third title

== Goal Scorers ==
Player	Team	Goals			
Player	Team	FG	PC	PS	Total
Arslan Qadir	Pakistan	4	0	0	4
Awais-Ur Rehman	Pakistan	3	0	0	3
Gaganpreet Singh	India	0	3	0	3
Tasawar Abbas	Pakistan	2	0	0	2
Aleem Bilal	Pakistan	0	2	0	2
Khorshadur Rahman	Bangladesh	0	2	0	2
Mandeep Antil	India	1	0	0	1
Umar Bhutta	Pakistan	1	0	0	1
Krishno-Kumar Das	Bangladesh	1	0	0	1
Harindra Dharmarathna	Sri Lanka	0	1	0	1
Milon Hossain	Bangladesh	1	0	0	1
Ashraful Islam	Bangladesh	0	1	0	1
Puskar Khisa	Bangladesh	1	0	0	1
Rasel Mahmud	Bangladesh	0	1	0	1
Gagandeep Singh	India	1	0	0	1
Pradhan Somanna	India	1	0	0	1
Muhammad Umar	India	1	0	0	1
Sanjeep Nilam Xess	India	0	1	0	1
Total		17	11	0	28

Source: "Scorers".

== Officials ==
*All officials were appointed by Asian Hockey Federation.
Source: "Officials".

Tournament Director

- (Malaysia) Daljit Singh

Technical Officer

- (India) Rakesh Bhatia
- (Sri Lanka) Halinge Mithripala
- (Pakistan) Uzma Rizvi

Judge

- (Bangladesh) Hassan Mohd Ali
- (India) Rohini Bopanna
- (Pakistan) Mohd Ahsan Jaleel
- (India) Faheem Mohd Khan
- (Sri Lanka) M. Fazeer Laheer
- (Nepal) Balaram Shresta

Umpires Manager

- (Malaysia) Amarjit Singh

Neutral Umpire

- (Malaysia) Ilanggo Kanabathu
- (Pakistan) Binish Hayat
- (Malaysia) Iskandar Rusli
- (Japan) Junko Wagatsuma

National Umpire

- (Pakistan) Amir Hamzah Khan
- (Bangladesh) Salim Lucky
- (India) Rama Potnis
- (Sri Lanka) Dayan Dissanayake
- (India) Napoleon Chanamthabam

== See also ==
- Field hockey at the 2016 South Asian Games – Women
