= Preeti Dubey =

Indian Hockey player

Personal information
- Born: 13 June 1998 (age 28) Gorakhpur, Uttar Pradesh, India

Sport
- Sport: Field hockey
- Position: Forward
Senior career
Years	Team	Caps	Goals
2015–	Madhya Pradesh	-	-
2025–	Delhi SG Pipers	-	-
National team
Years	Team	Caps	Goals
2015	India U21	6	(10)
2015–	India	56	(9)
Medal record
Women's field hockey
Representing India
Asian Champions Trophy
Gold medal – first place	2016 Singapore	Team
Gold medal – first place	2024 Rajgir	Team
South Asian Games
Gold medal – first place	2016 Guwahati	Team

Preeti Dubey is an Indian field hockey player. She was a part of the gold medal-winning team at the 2016 Asian Champions Trophy and the 2016 South Asian Games.

== Early life ==
Hailing from Gorakhpur, Dubey met coach Paramjeet Singh and shifted base to Madhya Pradesh in 2014. In 2017, she was chosen as the captain of India A. She is an alumna of Bir Bahadur Singh Sports College.
