= Madushani =

Madushani is a surname. People with the surname include:

- Kaushalya Madushani (1995–2022), Sri Lankan track and field athlete
- Lasanthi Madushani (born 1987), Sri Lankan cricketer

== See also ==
- Nayana Madushani Jayaneththi, Sri Lankan field hockey player
