= Punam Barla =

Indian field hockey player

Personal information
- Nationality: India
- Born: 10 February 1995 (age 31) Odisha, India

Sport
- Country: India
- Sport: Hockey
- Position: Forward
Medal record
Women's Field Hockey
Representing India
Asian Champions Trophy
Gold medal – first place	2016 Singapore
South Asian Games
Gold medal – first place	2016 Guwahati	Team

Punam Barla (born 10 February 1995) is a member of the India women's national field hockey team who plays as a forward for the team. Hailing from Odisha she made her International debut in 2015.
