= Field hockey at the 1995 South Asian Games =

Field Hockey at the 1995 South Asian Games

Tournament details
- Host country: India
- City: Chennai
- Dates: 18 December 2006–26 December 2006
- Teams: 5
- Venue: 1

Final positions
- Champions: India (1st title)
- Runner-up: Pakistan
- Third place: Bangladesh

Tournament statistics
- Matches played: 10
- Goals scored: 90 (9 per match)

Field hockey at the 1995 South Asian Games for men was held in Chennai Mayor Radhakrishnan Hockey Stadium, India from 18 – 26 December 1995. This was the first edition of field hockey in the history of South Asian Games.

== Teams ==
- Bangladesh
- India
- Nepal
- Pakistan
- Sri Lanka

== Results ==
Pos	Team	Pld	W	D	L	GF	GA	GD	Pts
1	India (H, C)	4	4	0	0	32	2	+30	12
2	Pakistan	4	3	0	1	39	7	+32	9
3	Bangladesh	4	1	1	2	13	12	+1	4
4	Sri Lanka	4	1	1	2	5	15	−10	4
5	Nepal	4	0	0	4	1	54	−53	0

(C) Champions; (H) Hosts

Results
Teams	Bangladesh	India	Pakistan	Nepal	Sri Lanka
Bangladesh	—	0–7	2–3	10–1	1–1
India	7–0	—	5–2	18–0	2–0
Pakistan	3–2	2–5	—	22–0	12–0
Nepal	1–10	0–18	0–22	—	0–4
Sri Lanka	1–1	0–2	0–12	4–0	—

== Winner ==
Men's Field Hockey at the 1995 South Asian Games

India
First title

== Medallists ==
Gold	Silver	Bronze
India	Pakistan	Bangladesh
