= Field hockey at the 2010 South Asian Games =

Field Hockey at the 2010 South Asian Games – Men

Tournament details
- Host country: Bangladesh
- City: Dhaka
- Dates: 30 January 2010–7 February 2010
- Teams: 5
- Venue: 1

Final positions
- Champions: Pakistan (2nd title)
- Runner-up: India
- Third place: Bangladesh

Tournament statistics
- Matches played: 12
- Goals scored: 115 (9.58 per match)

Field hockey at the 2010 South Asian Games for men was the third edition of Field hockey at the South Asian Games, held in Maulana Bhasani Hockey Stadium, Dhaka, Bangladesh from 30 January – 07 February 2010.

== Teams ==
- Bangladesh
- India
- Nepal
- Pakistan
- Sri Lanka

== Results ==
Results
Teams	Bangladesh	India	Pakistan	Nepal	Sri Lanka
Bangladesh	—	3–3	0–2	24–0	3–1
India	3–3	—	5–1	21–0	7–2
Pakistan	3–0	1–5	—	19–0	2–0
Nepal	0–24	0–21	0–19	—	1–15
Sri Lanka	1–3	2–7	0–2	15–1	—

=== Medal matches ===
==== Bronze medal match ====
(bronze) Bangladesh 2–1 Sri Lanka

==== Gold medal match ====
(silver) India 1 (3)–1 (4) Pakistan (gold)

== Winner ==
Men's Field Hockey at the 2010 South Asian Games

Pakistan
Second title

== Medallists ==
Gold	Silver	Bronze
Pakistan	India	Bangladesh
