= Nepal men's national field hockey team =

Nepal
- Association: Nepal Hockey Association
- Confederation: AHF (Asia)
Home	Away

FIH ranking
- Current: 79 ▼10 (9 March 2026)

The Nepal men's national field hockey team represents Nepal in international field hockey competitions. It is ranked 79 ▼10 (9 March 2026) in the world and controlled by the Nepal Hockey Association, the governing body for field hockey in Nepal.

== Competitive record ==
=== Hockey Series ===
- 2018-19 – First round

=== South Asian Games ===
[[Field hockey at the South Asian Games|South Asian Games]]
No	Year	Host	Position
1	1995	Madras, India	5th
3	2010	Dhaka, Bangladesh	4th
5	2027	Lahore, Pakistan	To be determined

== Results and fixtures ==
18 December 2018 Open hockey series	Kazakhstan	6–0	Nepal
12:00	Tashkeyev 15', 25', 53', 59'; Kozhym 18'; Uzbek 39'	Report

20 December 2018 Open hockey series	Uzbekistan	6–1	Nepal
14:00	Khakimov 23'; Khaytboev 36'; Sultonov 50'; Ruslan 52', 53'; Kalandarov 60+'	Report	Rana 41'

21 December 2018 Open hockey series	Nepal	4–0	Afghanistan
12:00	Rana 3'; Acharya 28', 32'; Karki 58'	Report

== Players ==
=== Current squad ===
The following players were named for the 2018-19.

- Parkash Khaniya
- Keshab Joshi
- Narendra Karki
- Suresh Joshi
- Ranjit Raut
- Bhanu Bhattarai
- Amit Shriswastav
- Kisan Magar
- Dev Dhami
- Ram Shah (C)
- Dipendra Air
- Pradip Rajbanshi
- Roshan Chaudhary
- Rajendra Karki
- Roman Rana
- Kishor Ojha (GK)
- Sagar Acharya
- Parvesh Khaniya
