= Olympian Balbir Singh International Hockey Stadium =

Field hockey stadium in Mohali, India

- Interactive map of Olympian Balbir Singh International Hockey Stadium
- Location: Mohali, Punjab, India
- Coordinates: 30°41′27.09″N 76°44′14.13″E
- Owner: Punjab Department of Sports
- Capacity: 13,648

Construction
- Built: Opened 27 September 2013

Tenant
- Punjab Warriors (2013–present)

Mohali International Hockey Stadium or OBSS International Hockey Stadium is a field hockey stadium in Mohali, Punjab, India. This stadium serves as the home ground for the hockey club, Punjab Warriors, of Hockey India League. On May 25, 2021, the stadium was renamed the Olympian Balbir Singh Senior International Hockey Stadium in honor of Balbir Singh Sr.

== Construction and opening ==
The construction of the stadium began in 2011 over 11.8 acres and cost ₹42 crore (US$6.75 million). The stadium has an advanced pink-blue astroturf and has a seating capacity of about 13,500. The stadium was constructed as a part of state government's plan to uplift the sports infra structure in the state which includes development and construction of six hockey stadiums along with 10 multi-purpose stadiums. The stadium is located opposite the international cricket stadium, Punjab Cricket Association Stadium.

The stadium was inaugurated by Chief Minister of Punjab Parkash Singh Badal on 27 September 2013. An exhibition match was played between Punjab XI and Rest of India on this occasion which was won by former by 3–2. Hockey Olympians Balbir Singh, Sr., Col. Balbir Singh, Rajinder Singh, Harmeek Singh and Sukhbir Singh Grewal, Rajya Sabha M.P. Sukhdev Singh Dhindsa, chief parliamentary secretary N.K. Sharma and former union minister Balwant Singh Ramoowalia were also present on the occasion.

=== Turf ===
The turf, FIH global certified hockey turf (unfilled), HT LSR 13 nd, is manufactured by Greenfield Sports Turf Systems and project was executed by Syncotts International.
