= Assam Hockey =

Assam Hockey, earlier known as Assam Hockey Association, was founded in 1952. SP Barua and JK Barua took the chairs of president and secretary respectively in the inaugural year. Its office is situated at the Nowgang District Sports Association complex. It is one of the permanent members of the Hockey India. President of Assam Hockey is Tapan Kumar Das and the General Secretary is Kalyani Deka The main stadium of hockey in Assam is Maulana Md. Tayabullah Hockey Stadium in Guwahati.
