= Yendala Soundarya =

Indian hockey player, coach (born 1989)

Yendala Soundarya (16 September 1989) is a former Indian women's field hockey player from Telangana who earned over 145 caps. She plays as a centre-forward. She is part of the support staff of the coaching team of the Indian women's hockey team and the head coach of the Hockey5s team that won the silver medal at Hockey5s World Cup in 2024. She is also the first women's hockey player from Telangana to play for India.

== Early life and education ==
Soundarya hails from Nizamabad in Telangana State. Her father Sailu is a mason and her mother Chandrakala works in a Beedi factory, rolling out beedis for a daily payment. She has a sister and a brother. She did her schooling at Modern Public School, Nizamabad. Her first coach was Gloria Jesudoss, a former national player and goalkeeper from Karnataka. She was a product of Sports Authority of India hostel. She later joined Central Railways in sports quota.

== Career ==
Soundarya made her debut in 2006 when the Indian team toured Italy. In August 2009, she was part of the Indian Junior team that played the Junior World Cup at Boston, US under coach M. K. Kaushik. Next August, she played the 2010 Women's Hockey World Cup at Rosario, Argentina under coach Sandeep Somesh. In April 2014, she performed well as part of the Indian team that played test matches in Ireland and later in December, she also played the test matches against Italy. In March 2015, she completed 100 caps at the Hero FIH Hockey World League Round 2 at Major Dhyan Chand National Stadium, Delhi. She also took part in the 2016 South Asian Games at Guwahati.

=== Career as a coach ===
In April 2017, Soundarya graduated with flying colours passing the NIS coaching diploma from Sports Authority of India, South Centre, Bengaluru and was adjudged as the Outstanding Sportsperson of the batch. In January 2024, she was the coach of the Indian women's Hockey5s squad that won the silver medal at the inaugural Hockey5s World Cup in Muscat, Oman. Earlier in 2023, she coached the team that qualified at the Asian World Cup qualifiers.
