= Nayana Jayaneththi =

Sri Lankan field hockey player

Personal information
- Born: Kandy

Sport
- Sport: Field hockey
- Position: forward
- Club: Sri Lanka Navy
National team
Years	Team	Caps	Goals
–	Sri Lanka		(1)
Medal record
Representing Sri Lanka
women's Field hockey
South Asian Games
Silver medal – second place	2016 Guwahati	team

Nayana Madushani Jayaneththi also spelt as Nayana Jayanetthi is a former Sri Lankan field hockey player who represented Sri Lanka at international level. Her husband Nalantha is also a field hockey player who has represented Sri Lanka men's hockey team.

== Career ==
She pursued her primary education at the St. Anthony's Convent in Kandy and she was persuaded to take up the sport of field hockey by her school teachers. She represented of St. Anthony's Convent school hockey team in school level competitions and also went onto captain the school team. She joined Sri Lanka Navy after completing her secondary education.

She also captained Sri Lankan national team for a brief stint from 2014 to 2015. She also represented Sri Lanka at the 2016 South Asian Games and was part of Sri Lanka hockey team which competed in the inaugural edition of the women's hockey tournament at the South Asian Games. Sri Lanka secured silver medal in the three team tournament after losing the final to hosts India 10–0.
