= Phase 9, Mohali =

Sector 63
- Sector
- Location in Punjab, India
- Coordinates: 30.692816°N 76.737005°E
- Country: India
- State: Punjab
- District: Ajitgarh

Languages
  - Official: Punjabi
- Time zone: UTC+5:30 (IST)
- PIN: 160062
- Telephone code: 0172
- Vehicle registration: PB 65

Sector 63 (popularly known as Phase 9) is an important locality in Mohali famous for sports as Punjab Cricket Association Stadium, International Hockey Stadium and Sports complex of Department of Sports is situated in this locality. The seasonal rivulet N Choe (also called Attawa Choa) passes through it.

== Facilities ==
=== Administrative Offices ===
- Punjab Cricket Association, Headquarters
- International Hockey Stadium, Field Hockey, Headquarters

=== Healthcare ===
- Silver Oak Hospital

=== Religious ===
- Gurdwara Phase 9
- Shiva Temple

== Access ==
Sector 63 is situated on Mohali Stadium road. It is well connected with road, rail and air. The nearest airports are Chandigarh Airport and railway station at Industrial Area - Phase 9. Auto rickshaw are easily available for commuting. A few CTU local buses also available.
