= Field hockey at the South Asian Games =

- Most recent season or competition: Field hockey at the 2016 South Asian Games
- Sport: Field hockey
- Founded: 1995; 31 years ago
- First season: 1995
- Organising body: SAOC
- No. of teams: M: 5 W: 3
- Confederation: South Asia
- Most recent champions: M: Pakistan (3rd title); W: India (1st title)
- Most titles: M: Pakistan (3 titles); W: India (1 title)

Field hockey was introduced to the South Asian Games as a men's competition at the 1995 Games in Madras, India, with five teams, India, Pakistan, Bangladesh, Sri Lanka and Nepal, taking part. A women's competition was introduced in 2016.

== Results ==
=== Men's ===
Year	Host city	Teams	Gold medal match			Bronze medal match		
Year	Host city	Teams	Gold	Score	Silver	Bronze	Score	4th place
1995	(India); Madras	5	India	No playoffs	Pakistan	Bangladesh	No playoffs	Sri Lanka
1999	(Nepal); Kathmandu	No hockey tournament						
2004	(Pakistan); Islamabad	No hockey tournament						
2006	(Sri Lanka); Colombo	4	Pakistan	3–2	India	Sri Lanka	2–0	Bangladesh
2010	(Bangladesh); Dhaka	5	Pakistan	1–1 (aet); 4–3 (pen.)	India	Bangladesh	2–1	Sri Lanka
2016	(India); Guwahati & Shillong	4	Pakistan	1–0	India	Bangladesh	4–1	Sri Lanka

=== Women's ===
Year	Host city	Teams	Gold medal match			Bronze medal match		
Year	Host city	Teams	Gold	Score	Silver	Bronze	Score	4th place
2016	(India); Guwahati & Shillong	3	India	10–0	Sri Lanka	Nepal	Last placed team in Round-robin table	N/A

== Medal table ==
=== Men's ===
Rank	Nation	Gold	Silver	Bronze	Total
1	Pakistan (PAK)	3	1	0	4
2	India (IND)	1	3	0	4
3	Bangladesh (BAN)	0	0	3	3
4	Sri Lanka (SRI)	0	0	1	1
Totals (4 entries)		4	4	4	12

=== Women's ===
Rank	Nation	Gold	Silver	Bronze	Total
1	India (IND)	1	0	0	1
2	Sri Lanka (SRI)	0	1	0	1
3	Nepal (NEP)	0	0	1	1
Totals (3 entries)		1	1	1	3
