= Maulana Md. Tayabullah Hockey Stadium =

Field hockey venue in India

- Interactive map of Maulana Md. Tayabullah Hockey Stadium
- Full name: Maulana Md. Tayabullah Hockey Stadium
- Location: Bhetapara, Guwahati, Assam, India
- Coordinates: 26°07′06.0″N 91°46′08.8″E
- Owner: Sports Authority of Assam, Government of Assam
- Capacity: 2,000

Construction
- Built: 2007
- Renovated: 2016

Tenant
- Assam Hockey

Maulana Md. Tayabullah Hockey Stadium is a field hockey stadium in Guwahati, Assam, India, part of the Arjuna Bhogeswar Baruah Sports Complex. It has a seating capacity of 2,000 people. This stadium served as the hockey venue for the 33rd National Games of India in 2007, 12th South Asian Games in 2016 and the 2020 Khelo India Youth Games. It was built in 2007.
