= Nepal Hockey Association =

Governing body for hockey in Nepal

- नेपाल हक्की संघ
- Official Logo of the NHA
- Sport: Field hockey
- Category: Games
- Jurisdiction: (Nepal) National
- Abbreviation: NHA
- Founded: 1954; 72 years ago
- Affiliation: International Hockey Federation (FIH)
- Regional affiliation: Asian Hockey Federation (AHF)
- Headquarters: Kathmandu, Nepal
- President: Anil P. Sharma
- Secretary: Subarna Shrestha

Official website
- nepalhockey.org
- (Nepal)

Nepal Hockey Association plans, directs and conducts all the activities for both men's and women's field hockey in Nepal. It is registered under National Sports Council as the sole body responsible towards promoting the sport.

NHA is one of the oldest sport governing bodies in Nepal. The sport was really popular in the country (especially Kathmandu area) in 70s and 90s. In recent years the association has been committed to reaching new heights of the game in the country by introducing grassroot level programs in schools nationwide.

Yearly, national-level tournaments for men and women are organized.

On 22 April, 2024, Dhulikhel also allocated land for the construction of an international-level hockey stadium. Bagmati Province Sports Development Council is preparing the DPR for the stadium's construction. Additionally, the site will consist of a training hall, fitness studio, and all other required facilities.

== Competitions ==
=== Current title holders ===
Competition	Year	Champions	Title	Next edition
Senior (men's)
Men's National Hockey Championship	2025	Nepal Army Club	National Hockey Champion	2026
Girija Prasad Koirala Memorial Men's Hockey Tournament	2024 (5th Edition)	Nepal Army Club	National Champion	TBD
Senior (women's)
Women's National Hockey Championship	2025	Nepal Army Club	National Hockey Champion	2026
Sahana Pradhan Memorial Women's Hockey Tournament	2024 (6th Edition)	Nepal Army Club	National Champion	TBD
