= Field hockey at the 2018 Asian Games – Men's Qualifier =

2018 Men's Asian Games Qualifier

Tournament details
- Host country: Oman
- City: Muscat
- Dates: 8 – 17 March 2018
- Teams: 8 (from 1 confederation)
- Venue: Sultan Qaboos Sports Complex

Final positions
- Champions: Oman
- Runner-up: Bangladesh
- Third place: Sri Lanka

Tournament statistics
- Matches played: 20
- Goals scored: 182 (9.1 per match)
- Top scorer: (Hong Kong) Kin Kan Tsang (10 goals)

The 2018 Field hockey at the 2018 Asian Games Qualification was the direct qualification for the Field hockey at the 2018 Asian Games for men. It was held from the 7th until the 18th of March 2018 in Muscat, Oman.

== Teams ==
- Afghanistan
- Bangladesh
- Chinese Taipei
- Hong Kong
- Kazakhstan
- Oman
- Sri Lanka
- Thailand

== Format ==
The eight teams will be split into two groups of four teams. The top two teams advance to the semifinals to determine the winner in a knockout system. The bottom two teams of each group play for the 5th to 8th place, also in a knockout system.

== Preliminary round ==
All times are local (UTC+04:00).

=== Pool A ===
Pos	Team	Pld	W	D	L	GF	GA	GD	Pts	Qualification
1	Bangladesh	3	3	0	0	35	1	+34	9	Semi-finals
2	Thailand	3	2	0	1	26	5	+21	6	Semi-finals
3	Hong Kong	3	1	0	2	20	9	+11	3	
4	Afghanistan	3	0	0	3	1	67	−66	0	

Source: FIH
Rules for classification: 1) points; 2) goal difference; 3) goals scored; 4) head-to-head result.

9 March 2018
18:00

Hong Kong	19–1	Afghanistan
Kin Kan Tsang 4', 13', 19', 40'; Siu 6'; Ho 12', 38', 55'; Iu 14', 34', 47'; Kam 16', 52'; Chun Hin Yu 18'; Chi Wai Yu 25', 33'; Cheun 29'; Angus Chan 54', 56'	Report	Achekzai 15'

Umpires:
Dayan Dissanayake (SRI)
Mahmood Al Hasani (OMA)

9 March 2018
20:00

Bangladesh	5–0	Thailand
Sarower Hossain 14'; Jubair 27'; Milon Hossain 35'; Sarkar 47'; Chayan 51'	Report

Umpires:
Suolong You (CHN)
Khamis Al Balushi (OMA)

11 March 2018
18:00

Hong Kong	1–5	Bangladesh
Iu 15'	Report	Ashraful Islam 33', 35'; Sarkar 47'; Mahmud 58'; Milon Hossain 60'

Umpires:
Nazmi Kamarudin (MAS)
Khamis Al Balushi (OMA)

11 March 2018
20:00

Thailand	23–0	Afghanistan
Kampanthong 4', 13', 34', 34', 40', 45', 48', 52'; Samoechai 11', 56'; Yosiri 12', 38'; Intani 20', 27', 59'; Harapan 29', 49'; Boon-Art 30', 36'; Lenbury 34', 50'; Maseela 47'; Thanperm 60'	Report

Umpires:
Makhsudbek Urmanov (KAZ)
Dayan Dissanayake (SRI)

13 March 2018
15:00

Bangladesh	25–0	Afghanistan
Arshad Hossain 1', 21', 32'; Islam 9', 26', 30'; Emon 15', 33', 35', 53'; Mahmud 16', 42', 45'; Chayan 17', 18', 23'; Uddin 19'; Sarkar 23', 25', 56', 60'; Shetful 37', 58'; Jubair 48', 52'	Report

Umpires:
Surachaet Visavateeranon (THA)
Mahmood Al Hasani (OMA)

13 March 2018
17:00

Thailand	3–0	Hong Kong
Harapan 20', 36'; Boon-Art 55'	Report

Umpires:
Hari Silvarajoo (SGP)
Khamis Al Balushi (OMA)

=== Pool B ===
Pos	Team	Pld	W	D	L	GF	GA	GD	Pts	Qualification
1	Oman (H)	3	3	0	0	12	4	+8	9	Semi-finals
2	Sri Lanka	3	2	0	1	11	6	+5	6	Semi-finals
3	Chinese Taipei	3	1	0	2	12	11	+1	3	
4	Kazakhstan	3	0	0	3	3	17	−14	0	

Source: FIH
Rules for classification: 1) points; 2) goal difference; 3) goals scored; 4) head-to-head result.
(H) Hosts

8 March 2018
18:00

Sri Lanka	6–0	Kazakhstan
Ranasingha 22', 48'; Kulathunga 22'; Rathnayake 45'; Bandara 48'; Sudusinghe 53'	Report

Umpires:
Nazmi Kamarudin (MAS)
Shahbaz Ali (BAN)

8 March 2018
20:00

Oman	4–3	Chinese Taipei
Mahmood Al Hasni 14', 58'; Imad Al Hasani 41'; Al Qasmi 51'	Report	Chia-Ching Huang 36'; Li 53'; Hu 59'

Umpires:
Hari Silvarajoo (SGP)
Ahmed Elsayed Ahmed (EGY)

10 March 2018
18:00

Chinese Taipei	8–3	Kazakhstan
Liu 7'; Hsu 24', 39'; Hu 49', 58'; Lu 50'; Li 57'; Tzu-Yu Huang 59'	Report	Dyussebekov 5', 58'; Uzbek 46'

Umpires:
Surachaet Visavateeranon (THA)
Ming Yeung Chor (HKG)

10 March 2018
20:00

Sri Lanka	1–5	Oman
Rathnayake 56'	Report	Al-Saadi 16', 51'; Al Shaaib 28'; Bait Shamaiaa 39'; Rajab 44'

Umpires:
Shahbaz Ali (BAN)
Hari Silvarajoo (SGP)

12 March 2018
18:00

Chinese Taipei	1–4	Sri Lanka
Lu 16'	Report	Doranegala 19'; Sudusinghe 28'; Rathnayake 35', 52'

Umpires:
Suolong You (CHN)
Nazmi Kamarudin (MAS)

12 March 2018
20:00

Oman	3–0	Kazakhstan
Al Qasmi 14'; Rajab 37'; Al Nofali 60'	Report

Umpires:
Ahmed Elsayed Ahmed (EGY)
Ming Yeung Chor (HKG)

== Fifth to eighth place classification ==
=== Bracket ===
5th–8th place semi-finals
15 March
Hong Kong	3
Kazakhstan	4
15 March
Chinese Taipei	14
Afghanistan	1

Fifth place
16 March
Kazakhstan	0
Chinese Taipei	4
Seventh place
16 March
Hong Kong	16
Afghanistan	0

=== 5th–8th place semi-finals ===
15 March 2018
13:30

Hong Kong	3–4	Kazakhstan
Kin Kan Tsang 16'; Iu 21'; Martin Tsang 39'	Report	Urmanov 32'; Aman Yelubayev 43', 53'; Tashkeyev 57'

Umpires:
Mahmood Al Hasani (OMA)
Shahbaz Ali (BAN)

15 March 2018
15:45

Chinese Taipei	14–1	Afghanistan
Tzu-Yu Huang 2', 42'; Chia-Ching Huang 5'; Li 11'; Hu 16'; Shih 19', 23', 25', 50', 58'; Liu 22', 27'; Hsu 30'; Cheng-Hao Chang 45'	Report	Satari 37'

Umpires:
Surachaet Visavateeranon (THA)
Ming Yeung Chor (HKG)

=== Seventh and eighth place ===
16 March 2018
18:00

Hong Kong	16–0	Afghanistan
Kin Kan Tsang 3', 4', 9', 13', 28'; Iu 12', 15', 49'; Monthong 15'; Tse 25'; Kam 30'; Martin Tsang 33'; Chi Wai Yu 43'; Angus Chan 50'; Hou-Fung Chan 53', 55'	Report

Umpires:
Dayan Dissanayake (SRI)
Mahmood AL Hasani (OMA)

=== Fifth and sixth place ===
16 March 2018
20:15

Kazakhstan	0–4	Chinese Taipei
	Report	Li 12'; Liu 13', 36'; Lu 23'

Umpires:
Surachaet Visavateeranon (THA)
Khamis AL Balushi (OMA)

== First to fourth place classification ==
=== Bracket ===
Semi-finals
15 March
Bangladesh	3
Sri Lanka	2
15 March
Oman	8
Thailand	0

Final
17 March
Bangladesh	0
Oman	2
Third place
17 March
Sri Lanka	4
Thailand	1

=== Semi-finals ===
15 March 2018
18:00

Bangladesh	3–2	Sri Lanka
Sarkar 49', 52'; Milon Hossain 58'	Report	Sudusinghe 34'; Ranasingha 51'

Umpires:
Ahmed Elsayed Ahmed (EGY)
Suolong You (CHN)

15 March 2018
20:15

Oman	8–0	Thailand
Imad Al Hasani 12', 57'; Al Fazari 27', 29'; Rajab 34', 49'; Al Raiisi 53'; Al Shaaibi 56'	Report

Umpires:
Nazmi Kamarudin (MAS)
Hari Silvarajoo (SGP)

=== Third and fourth place ===
17 March 2018
18:00

Sri Lanka	4–1	Thailand
Rathnayake 20'; Sudusinghe 22', 34'; Ranasingha 27'	Report	Samoechai 26'

Umpires:
Ahmed Elsayed Ahmed (EGY)
Khamis Al Balushi (OMA)

=== Final ===
17 March 2018
20:15

Bangladesh	0–2	Oman
	Report	Rashas Al Fazari 28'; Rajab 31'

Umpires:
Suolong You (CHN)
Nazmi Kamarudin (MAS)

== Statistics ==
=== Final standings ===
Pos	Team	Qualification
1	Oman (H)	2018 Asian Games
2	Bangladesh	2018 Asian Games
3	Sri Lanka	2018 Asian Games
4	Thailand	2018 Asian Games
5	Chinese Taipei	2018 Asian Games
6	Kazakhstan	
7	Hong Kong	
8	Afghanistan	

Source: FIH
(H) Host

=== Goalscorers ===
10 goals

- (Hong Kong) Kin Kan Tsang

8 goals

- (Bangladesh) Roman Sarkar
- (Hong Kong) Felix Chi Him Iu
- (Thailand) Thanop Kampanthong

5 goals

- (Bangladesh) Ashraful Islam
- (Oman) Basim Khatar Rajab
- (Sri Lanka) Anuradha Rathnayake
- (Sri Lanka) Sandaruwan Sudusinghe
- (Chinese Taipei) Chin Kun Liu
- (Chinese Taipei) Tsung-Jen Shih

4 goals

- (Bangladesh) Mamunur Rahman Chayan
- (Bangladesh) Deen Md. Emon
- (Bangladesh) Rashel Mahmud
- (Hong Kong) Angus Chan
- (Sri Lanka) Dhammika Ranasingha
- (Thailand) Borirak Harapan
- (Chinese Taipei) Chun-Che Hu
- (Chinese Taipei) An-Szu Li

3 goals

- (Bangladesh) Milon Hossain
- (Bangladesh) Hasan Jubair
- (Hong Kong) Ching Ho
- (Hong Kong) Shung-Yin Kam
- (Hong Kong) Chi Wai Yu
- (Oman) Rashad Al Fazari
- (Oman) Imad Al Hasani
- (Thailand) Thanakrit Boon-Art
- (Thailand) Norrawich Intani
- (Thailand) Seksit Samoechai
- (Chinese Taipei) Ching-Chieh Hsu
- (Chinese Taipei) Tzu-Yu Huang
- (Chinese Taipei) Sung-Ting Lu

2 goals

- (Bangladesh) Farhad Shetful
- (Hong Kong) Hou-Fong Chan
- (Hong Kong) Martin Tsang
- (Kazakhstan) Yerkebulan Dyussebekov
- (Kazakhstan) Aman Yelubayev
- (Oman) Mahmood Al Hasni
- (Oman) Asaad Mubarak Al Qasmi
- (Oman) Khalid Al Shaaibi
- (Oman) Salah Al-Saadi
- (Thailand) Wiros Yosiri
- (Thailand) Vong Lenbury
- (Chinese Taipei) Chia-Ching Huang

1 goal

- (Afghanistan) Abdul Achekzai
- (Afghanistan) Abdul Satari
- (Bangladesh) Sarower Hossain
- (Bangladesh) Naim Uddin
- (Hong Kong) Kwun Wa Cheun
- (Hong Kong) Windfall Monthong
- (Hong Kong) Chung Ming Siu
- (Hong Kong) Man Chun Tse
- (Hong Kong) Chun Hin Yu
- (Kazakhstan) Yermek Tahskeyev
- (Kazakhstan) Daulet Urmanov
- (Kazakhstan) Tilek Uzbek
- (Oman) Ahmed Al Nofali
- (Oman) Marwan Al Raiisi
- (Oman) Mahmood Bait Shamaiaa
- (Sri Lanka) Damith Bandara
- (Sri Lanka) Ishanka Doranegala
- (Sri Lanka) Rajitha Kulathunga
- (Thailand) Nisman Maseela
- (Thailand) Aphiwat Thanperm
- (Chinese Taipei) Cheng-Hao Chang
