= 2016–17 Men's FIH Hockey World League Round 1 =

Field hockey tournament

Tournament details
- Dates: 9 April – 9 October 2016
- Teams: 43 (from 5 confederations)
- Venue: 8 (in 8 host cities)

Tournament statistics
- Matches played: 103
- Goals scored: 773 (7.5 per match)
- Top scorer: (Fiji) Leevan Dutta (23 goals)

The 2016–17 Men's FIH Hockey World League Round 1 was the first stage of the 2016–17 edition of the Men's FIH Hockey World League. It was held from April to October 2016.

== Singapore ==
Hockey World League Round 1 – Singapore
Tournament details
- Host country: Singapore
- Dates: 9–17 April
- Teams: 9
- Venue: Sengkang Hockey Stadium

Final positions
- Champions: China
- Runner-up: Sri Lanka
- Third place: Thailand

Tournament statistics
- Matches played: 23
- Goals scored: 166 (7.22 per match)
- Top scorer: (China) Huang Jingcheng (12 goals)

=== First round ===
All times are local (UTC+8).

==== Pool A ====
Pos	Team	Pld	W	PW	PL	L	GF	GA	GD	Pts	Qualification
1	China	4	4	0	0	0	49	1	+48	12	Semifinals
2	Thailand	4	3	0	0	1	23	14	+9	9	Semifinals
3	Hong Kong	4	2	0	0	2	14	21	−7	6	
4	Brunei	4	1	0	0	3	3	22	−19	3	
5	Vietnam	4	0	0	0	4	2	33	−31	0	

Source: FIH
Rules for classification: 1) points; 2) goal difference; 3) goals scored; 4) head-to-head result.

9 April 2016
09:00

Thailand	7–0	Brunei
Suphawong 2'; Thammueangkhun 38', 41', 62'; Manopab 51'; Srilit 58'; Boon-Art 68'	Report

Umpires:
Steve Rogers (AUS)
Hari Silvarajoo (SIN)

9 April 2016
15:00

Hong Kong	8–1	Vietnam
Iu 4', 35+', 43'; Tsang 23', 58'; Tse 54'; Shepherdson 62'; Ali 70'	Report	Nhật 70+'

Umpires:
Surachaet Visavateeranon (THA)
Ye Kyaw Thu (MYA)

10 April 2016
15:00

Hong Kong	3–0	Brunei
Iu 15', 34'; Chan 52'	Report

Umpires:
Roshan Hemantha (SRI)
Rawi Anbananthan (MAS)

10 April 2016
17:00

China	11–0	Vietnam
Zhang 6', 19', 41', 51'; Huang 9', 11', 32', 63'; Cheng 54'; E 64'; Guo Z. 65'	Report

Umpires:
Chor Ming Yeung (HKG)
Zaur Zaurbekov (KAZ)

11 April 2016
17:00

Thailand	1–11	China
Boon-Art 40'	Report	Lin 2', 6'; Huang 33'; Meng L. 44'; Guo H. 48', 52'; Wang B. 50'; Zhang 61'; Meng D. 63', 68', 70'

Umpires:
Steve Rogers (AUS)
Mohd Ramli (MAS)

12 April 2016
17:30

Brunei	3–1	Vietnam
Z. Yusup 24'; Momin 34'; Ahmad 70+'	Report	Nguyễn 42'

Umpires:
Zaur Zaurbekov (KAZ)
Ye Kyaw Thu (MYA)

13 April 2016
17:00

Vietnam	0–11	Thailand
	Report	Thammueangkhun 4', 21', 29', 41', 50'; Suphawong 19', 66'; Boon-Art 31', 49', 62'; Janwiangngam 70'

Umpires:
Ye Kyaw Thu (MYA)
Roshan Hemantha (SRI)

13 April 2016
17:30

Hong Kong	0–16	China
	Report	E 3', 6', 30'; Huang 11', 45', 49', 55', 57', 70+'; Kang 20'; Guo H. 24'; Lin 26', 53'; Zhang 29'; Wang X. 33'; Yu 48'

Umpires:
Steve Rogers (AUS)
Hideki Kinoshita (JPN)

14 April 2016
17:00

Thailand	4–3	Hong Kong
Thammueangkhun 21', 45'; Boon-Art 50', 51'	Report	Siu 10'; Tsang 14'; Iu 39'

Umpires:
Rawi Anbananthan (MAS)
Tao Zhinan (CHN)

14 April 2016
19:30

China	11–0	Brunei
Wang B 1'; Zhang 6', 41'; Su L. 13'; Yu 21'; Su K. 29', 32', 47'; E 35'; Wang X. 42'; Meng D. 54'	Report

Umpires:
Zaur Zaurbekov (KAZ)
Roshan Hemantha (SRI)

==== Pool B ====
Pos	Team	Pld	W	PW	PL	L	GF	GA	GD	Pts	Qualification
1	Sri Lanka	3	3	0	0	0	16	1	+15	9	Semifinals
2	Singapore (H)	3	2	0	0	1	13	3	+10	6	Semifinals
3	Kazakhstan	3	1	0	0	2	5	13	−8	3	
4	Myanmar	3	0	0	0	3	1	18	−17	0	

Source: FIH
Rules for classification: 1) points; 2) goal difference; 3) goals scored; 4) head-to-head result.
(H) Host

9 April 2016
09:30

Sri Lanka	7–0	Myanmar
Nanayakkara 23'; Welagedara 25'; Fernando 35', 56'; Sudusingha 43', 55'; Dharmarathne 49'	Report

Umpires:
Rawi Anbananthan (MAS)
Hideki Kinoshita (JPN)

9 April 2016
17:30

Singapore	6–0	Kazakhstan
Alias 27'; Goh 30'; Johari 34'; Marican 47', 69'; Yuhari 60'	Report

Umpires:
Tao Zhinan (CHN)
Mohd Ramli (MAS)

12 April 2016
19:30

Kazakhstan	5–0	Myanmar
Sansyzbayev 10', 50', 64'; Tazhenov 19'; Almen 68'	Report

Umpires:
Hari Silvarajoo (SIN)
Surachaet Visavateeranon (THA)

12 April 2016
20:00

Sri Lanka	2–1	Singapore
Mahara 40'; Fernando 56'	Report	Amir 9'

Umpires:
Tao Zhinan (CHN)
Hideki Kinoshita (JPN)

13 April 2016
19:30

Kazakhstan	0–7	Sri Lanka
	Report	Sudusingha 7', 62'; Fernando 16', 21'; Mahara 36'; Doranegala 47'; Panthie 52'

Umpires:
Hari Silvarajoo (SIN)
Mohd Ramli (MAS)

14 April 2016
20:30

Singapore	6–1	Myanmar
Amir 11'; Salim 22'; Yuhari 27'; Murid 32'; Goh 38'; Teo 54'	Report	Ni 48'

Umpires:
Surachaet Visavateeranon (THA)
Chor Ming Yeung (HKG)

=== Second round ===
==== 7th–9th place semifinal ====
16 April 2016
09:00

Vietnam	0–6	Myanmar
	Report	Thet 4'; Ni 3', 52'; Zin 44', 47'; Wai 68'

Umpires:
Chor Ming Yeung (HKG)
Surachaet Visavateeranon (THA)

==== Seventh place game ====
17 April 2016
09:00

Brunei	2–5	Myanmar
Yusup 20'; Karim 57'	Report	Ni 9', 25', 55'; Thura 15'; Thet 18'

Umpires:
Chor Ming Yeung (HKG)
Hideki Kinoshita (JPN)

==== Fifth place game ====
16 April 2016
16:30

Hong Kong	4–3	Kazakhstan
Tsang 10'; Chan 18'; Iu 21', 52'	Report	Tazhenov 10', 43'; Almen 15'

Umpires:
Hari Silvarajoo (SIN)
Hideki Kinoshita (JPN)

==== Bracket ====
Semifinals
16 April
China	5
Singapore	0
16 April
Sri Lanka	5
Thailand	0

Final
17 April
China (p.s.o.)	3 (4)
Sri Lanka	3 (2)
Third place
17 April
Singapore	1
Thailand	3

===== Semifinals =====
16 April 2016
16:00

Sri Lanka	5–0	Thailand
Sudusingha 17', 69'; Rathnayaka 35', 60'; Fernando 70'	Report

Umpires:
Steve Rogers (AUS)
Tao Zhinan (CHN)

16 April 2016
18:30

China	5–0	Singapore
Zhang 11', 46', 50'; E 14', 68'	Report

Umpires:
Rawi Anbananthan (MAS)
Mohd Ramli (MAS)

===== Third place game =====
17 April 2016
15:00

Singapore	1–3	Thailand
Lee 31'	Report	Boon-Art 30', 65'; Thammueangkhun 42'

Umpires:
Tao Zhinan (CHN)
Mohd Ramli (MAS)

===== Final =====
17 April 2016
20:00

China	3–3	Sri Lanka
Meng L. 19'; Huang 38'; Meng D. 61'	Report	Sudusingha 49'; Mahara 55'; Nanayakkara 59'
Penalties
Meng D. (penalty shoot-out scored); Yu (penalty shoot-out missed); Lin (penalty shoot-out scored); E (penalty shoot-out scored); Guo Z. (penalty shoot-out scored)	4–2	(penalty shoot-out missed) Mahara; (penalty shoot-out missed) Nuwarapaksha; (penalty shoot-out scored) Rathnayaka; (penalty shoot-out scored) Karunamunige

Umpires:
Rawi Anbananthan (MAS)
Steve Rogers (AUS)

=== Final ranking ===
Qualified for Round 2

Rank	Team
Gold medal	China
Silver medal	Sri Lanka
Bronze medal	Thailand
4	Singapore
5	Hong Kong
6	Kazakhstan
7	Myanmar
8	Brunei
9	Vietnam

== Suva ==
Hockey World League Round 1 – Suva
Tournament details
- Host country: Fiji
- City: Suva
- Dates: 28 June – 2 July
- Teams: 5

Final positions
- Champions: Fiji
- Runner-up: Vanuatu
- Third place: Papua New Guinea

Tournament statistics
- Matches played: 20
- Goals scored: 155 (7.75 per match)
- Top scorer: (Fiji) Leevan Dutta (23 goals)

Matches were played in a Hockey5s format.

All times are local (UTC+12).

=== Pool ===
Pos	Team	Pld	W	PW	PL	L	GF	GA	GD	Pts	Qualification
1	Fiji (H)	8	7	1	0	0	66	13	+53	23	Round 2
2	Vanuatu	8	6	0	1	1	42	15	+27	19	
3	Papua New Guinea	8	3	0	1	4	26	29	−3	10	
4	Solomon Islands	8	1	1	1	5	12	42	−30	6	
5	Tonga	8	0	1	0	7	9	56	−47	2	

Source: FIH
Rules for classification: 1) points; 2) goal difference; 3) goals scored; 4) head-to-head result.
(H) Host

28 June 2016
09:00

Fiji	8–2	Tonga
A. Smith 3'; Dutta 3', 4', 10', 18', 20+1'; Mock 7'; Tora 16'	Report	Tahilanu 2', 13'

Umpires:
Ben Wilson (NZL)
Jack Donga (SOL)

28 June 2016
09:45

Papua New Guinea	4–2	Solomon Islands
Popal 2'; Dusty 4'; Tapo 6'; Pomat 14'	Report	Mamae 1'; Levo 12'

Umpires:
Epeli Tukuca (FIJ)
Rhiannon Murrie (AUS)

28 June 2016
12:00

Vanuatu	6–0	Tonga
Sam 3'; Z. Harry 3'; Namu 7', 9', 18'; Maltungtung 8'	Report

Umpires:
Ateca Fatufago (FIJ)
Jack Donga (SOL)

28 June 2016
12:45

Fiji	4–2	Papua New Guinea
H. Smith 1', 12'; Dutta 13', 18'	Report	Dusty 10'; A. Potuan 16'

Umpires:
Rhiannon Murrie (AUS)
Frank Vira (VAN)

28 June 2016
15:00

Vanuatu	5–3	Papua New Guinea
Z. Harry 2'; Sam 6', 12'; Namu 8', 20'	Report	Dusty 15'; A. Potuan 16'; Popal 19'

Umpires:
Epeli Tukuca (FIJ)
Ateca Fatufago (FIJ)

28 June 2016
15:45

Fiji	14–1	Solomon Islands
Dutta 1', 2', 8', 9', 11', 12', 18'; Mock 5', 15', 16', 16'; Tora 8'; Fong 11'; H. Smith 20'	Report	Mamae 5'

Umpires:
Ben Wilson (NZL)
Frank Vira (VAN)

29 June 2016
11:30

Solomon Islands	3–2	Tonga
Levo 4', 17'; Nuopula 13'	Report	Tahilanu 10+3'; Kailahi 17'

Umpires:
Epeli Tukuca (FIJ)
Frank Vira (VAN)

29 June 2016
12:15

Fiji	4–4	Vanuatu
Veitamana 1'; H. Smith 8'; Fong 14'; Mock 18'	Report	P. Harry 4'; Z. Harry 12'; Namu 13'; Sam 15'
Penalties
H. Smith (penalty shoot-out scored); A. Smith (penalty shoot-out missed); Mock (penalty shoot-out scored); Mock (penalty shoot-out scored)	3–2	(penalty shoot-out missed) Namu; (penalty shoot-out scored) Homry; (penalty shoot-out scored) Sam; (penalty shoot-out missed) Namu

Umpires:
Fetuao Nokise (SAM)
Rhiannon Murrie (AUS)

29 June 2016
14:30

Vanuatu	3–1	Solomon Islands
Sam 5', 14'; Katawa 16'	Report	Temoa 18'

Umpires:
Tessa Harman (FIJ)
Ben Wilson (NZL)

29 June 2016
15:15

Papua New Guinea	7–1	Tonga
Kisokau 2', 4'; Pokiap 5', 5'; Tapo 13'; Dusty 18'; A. Potuan 18'	Report	Tahilanu 12'

Umpires:
Epeli Tukuca (FIJ)
Jack Donga (SOL)

30 June 2016
10:00

Fiji	15–0	Tonga
Fong 2', 4', 12'; Tora 3'; Naduva 5', 15'; Veitamana 7'; Mock 9', 10', 18'; A. Smith 14'; Dutta 16', 17', 20'; H. Smith 17'	Report

Umpires:
Rhiannon Murrie (AUS)
Jack Donga (SOL)

30 June 2016
10:45

Papua New Guinea	1–1	Solomon Islands
A. Potuan 19'	Report	Levo 13'
Penalties
Pokiap (penalty shoot-out missed); J. Potuan (penalty shoot-out missed)	0–2	(penalty shoot-out scored) Temoa; (penalty shoot-out scored) Nuopula

Umpires:
Epeli Tukuca (FIJ)
Frank Vira (VAN)

30 June 2016
13:00

Vanuatu	8–1	Tonga
Sam 5', 9', 14'; Homry 7', 13', 19'; P. Harry 9'; Z. Harry 14'	Report	Sade 20'

Umpires:
Harry Heritage (FIJ)
Jack Donga (SOL)

30 June 2016
13:45

Fiji	8–1	Papua New Guinea
Dusty 2', 3', 19'; Tapo 6'; Pomat 12'; Kisokau 13'; J. Potuan 15', 17'	Report	Vatuvei 1'

Umpires:
Ben Wilson (NZL)
Fetuao Nokise (SAM)

1 July 2016
09:00

Vanuatu	7–0	Papua New Guinea
Sam 1', 2', 6'; Aromalo 10'; Namu 14', 20'; Z. Harry 15'	Report

Umpires:
Epeli Tukuca (FIJ)
Harry Heritage (FIJ)

1 July 2016
09:45

Fiji	8–1	Solomon Islands
Dutta 2', 5', 12'; Veitamana 4'; Mock 9'; H. Smith 11', 15', 15'	Report	Sade 8'

Umpires:
Rhiannon Murrie (AUS)
Fetuao Nokise (SAM)

1 July 2016
12:00

Solomon Islands	2–2	Tonga
Levo 9'; Mamae 17'	Report	Tahilanu 1', 3'
Penalties
Nuopula (penalty shoot-out missed); Temoa (penalty shoot-out missed); Hesi (penalty shoot-out scored); Hesi (penalty shoot-out missed); Nuopula (penalty shoot-out scored); Temoa (penalty shoot-out scored); Nuopula (penalty shoot-out missed); Temoa (penalty shoot-out missed); Hesi (penalty shoot-out missed)	3–4	(penalty shoot-out missed) Vatuvei; (penalty shoot-out missed) Feke; (penalty shoot-out scored) Tahilanu; (penalty shoot-out missed) Tahilanu; (penalty shoot-out scored) Paea; (penalty shoot-out scored) Feke; (penalty shoot-out missed) Tahilanu; (penalty shoot-out missed) Vatuvei; (penalty shoot-out scored) Kailahi

Umpires:
Harry Heritage (FIJ)
Fetuao Nokise (SAM)

1 July 2016
12:45

Fiji	5–2	Vanuatu
H. Smith 9'; Dutta 12'; Fong 14', 15', 16'	Report	Sam 18', 19'

Umpires:
Ben Wilson (NZL)
Rhiannon Murrie (AUS)

2 July 2016
09:45

Vanuatu	7–1	Tonga
Sam 1', 9', 13', 15'; Katawa 4', 10', 16'	Report	M. Feke 11'

Umpires:
Epeli Tukuca (FIJ)
Fetuao Nokise (SAM)

2 July 2016
11:30

Fiji	8–1	Papua New Guinea
H. Smith 3', 15'; Fong 6'; Mock 7', 9', 11'; Dutta 10', 11'	Report	Dusty 3'

Umpires:
Frank Vira (VAN)
Jack Donga (SOL)

== Prague ==
Hockey World League Round 1 – Prague
Tournament details
- Host country: Czech Republic
- City: Prague
- Dates: 30 August – 4 September
- Teams: 6
- Venue: SK Slavia Prague

Final positions
- Champions: Ukraine
- Runner-up: Italy
- Third place: Czech Republic

Tournament statistics
- Matches played: 15
- Goals scored: 110 (7.33 per match)
- Top scorer: (Italy) Agustin Nunez (10 goals)

All times are local (UTC+2).

=== Pool ===
Pos	Team	Pld	W	PW	PL	L	GF	GA	GD	Pts	Qualification
1	Ukraine	5	4	0	0	1	28	7	+21	12	Round 2
2	Italy	5	4	0	0	1	23	3	+20	12	Round 2
3	Belarus	5	4	0	0	1	28	10	+18	12	
4	Czech Republic (H)	5	2	0	0	3	26	10	+16	6	
5	Cyprus	5	0	1	0	4	3	39	−36	2	
6	Lithuania	5	0	0	1	4	2	41	−39	1	

Source: FIH
Rules for classification: 1) points; 2) goal difference; 3) goals scored; 4) head-to-head result.
(H) Host

30 August 2016
10:00

Ukraine	9–0	Lithuania
Kalinchuk 6', 23'; Paziuk 22'; Koshelenko 29'; Polishchuk 31', 60'; Luppa 42'; Popovchenko 57'; Yasinskyi 70'	Report

Umpires:
Tim Bond (NZL)
Alexandr Tóth (CZE)

30 August 2016
12:15

Italy	1–2	Belarus
Keenan 20'	Report	Lutsevich 7'; Hancharou 67'

Umpires:
Dave Dowdall (ENG)
Tomáš Holek (CZE)

30 August 2016
14:30

Czech Republic	10–1	Cyprus
Procházka 5', 21', 63'; Vohnický 8', 58'; Plochý 28', 29'; Nicklas 33', 66'; Babický 38'	Report	Lyne 69'

Umpires:
Maksym Perepelytsya (UKR)
Giedrius Kuizinas (LTU)

31 August 2016
10:00

Ukraine	7–2	Belarus
Paziuk 10', 18'; Polishchuk 20'; Kalinchuk 40', 68'; Koshelenko 44'; Onofriiuk 57'	Report	Hancharou 4'; Mikheichyk 34'

Umpires:
Vincenzo Ilgrande (ITA)
Tomáš Holek (CZE)

31 August 2016
12:15

Cyprus	0–10	Italy
	Report	Keenan 7', 70+'; Nunez 23', 26', 44'; Lixi 28'; Garbaccio 47'; Ursone 62', 64'; Perelli 66'

Umpires:
Tim Bond (NZL)
Giedrius Kuizinas (LTU)

31 August 2016
14:30

Czech Republic	12–0	Lithuania
Plochý 20', 24', 49', 60', 60'; Procházka 22', 58', 59'; Nicklas 24'; Vohnický 40', 65'; Soukup 66'	Report

Umpires:
Andrei Kliatskov (BLR)
Maksym Perepelytsya (UKR)

2 September 2016
14:30

Cyprus	1–8	Ukraine
Efthymiou 28'	Report	Kalinchuk 2', 38', 59', 67'; Paziuk 8'; Diachuk 18'; Onofriiuk 34'; Yakovenko 60'

Umpires:
Vincenzo Ilgrande (ITA)
Giedrius Kuizinas (LTU)

2 September 2016
16:45

Belarus	11–1	Lithuania
Belavusau 3', 11', 18', 50', 56'; Korsik 8'; Mikheichyk 21'; Liakh 29', 53'; Zhukouski 31'; Habryneuski 63'	Report	Balbatunovas 28'

Umpires:
Tomáš Holek (CZE)
Alexandr Tóth (CZE)

2 September 2016
19:00

Italy	2–1	Czech Republic
Nunez 9'; Ponce 15'	Report	Procházka 34'

Umpires:
Dave Dowdall (ENG)
Andrei Kliatskov (BLR)

3 September 2016
14:30

Belarus	10–0	Cyprus
Belavusau 12', 16', 63'; Mikheichyk 14', 18', 38'; Klimovich 20'; Skorb 25'; Hancharou 43'; Yakovenko 57'	Report

Umpires:
Dave Dowdall (ENG)
Alexandr Tóth (CZE)

3 September 2016
16:45

Lithuania	0–8	Italy
	Report	Lixi 11'; Nunez 21', 30', 41', 56', 59'; Herrera 43'; Ponce 68'

Umpires:
Andrei Kliatskov (BLR)
Maksym Perepelytsya (UKR)

3 September 2016
19:00

Ukraine	4–2	Czech Republic
Kalinchuk 16'; Polishchuk 25'; Koshelenko 47'; Kovalenko 57'	Report	Kyndl 22'; Hanuš 62'

Umpires:
Tim Bond (NZL)
Vincenzo Ilgrande (ITA)

4 September 2016
14:30

Lithuania	1–1	Cyprus
Kringelis 28'	Report	Stylianou 49'
Penalties
Kringelis (penalty shoot-out missed); Bandžiulis (penalty shoot-out missed); Asanavičius (penalty shoot-out missed); Bubnelis (penalty shoot-out scored); Pocevičius (penalty shoot-out missed)	1–2	(penalty shoot-out scored) Efthymiou; (penalty shoot-out missed) Stylianoy; (penalty shoot-out scored) Tunç; (penalty shoot-out missed) Lyne; (penalty shoot-out missed) Michael

Umpires:
Vincenzo Ilgrande (ITA)
Andrei Kliatskov (BLR)

4 September 2016
16:45

Italy	2–0	Ukraine
Nunez 46'; Castano 64'	Report

Umpires:
Tim Bond (NZL)
Tomáš Holek (CZE)

4 September 2016
19:00

Czech Republic	1–3	Belarus
Jahoda 19'	Report	Skorb 15'; Hancharou 43'; Tsimashkou 69'

Umpires:
Dave Dowdall (ENG)
Maksym Perepelytsya (UKR)

== Glasgow ==
Hockey World League Round 1 – Glasgow
Tournament details
- Host country: Scotland
- City: Glasgow
- Dates: 6–11 September
- Teams: 5
- Venue: Glasgow National Hockey Centre

Final positions
- Champions: Scotland
- Runner-up: Wales
- Third place: Switzerland

Tournament statistics
- Matches played: 10
- Goals scored: 70 (7 per match)
- Top scorer: (Scotland) Alan Forsyth (8 goals)

All times are local (UTC+1).

=== Pool ===
Pos	Team	Pld	W	PW	PL	L	GF	GA	GD	Pts	Qualification
1	Wales	4	4	0	0	0	19	5	+14	12	Round 2
2	Scotland (H)	4	3	0	0	1	27	3	+24	9	Round 2
3	Switzerland	4	2	0	0	2	13	8	+5	6	
4	Portugal	4	1	0	0	3	7	20	−13	3	
5	Slovakia	4	0	0	0	4	4	34	−30	0	

Source: FIH
Rules for classification: 1) points; 2) goal difference; 3) goals scored; 4) head-to-head result.
(H) Host

6 September 2016
17:00

Portugal	1–4	Wales
Franco 56'	Report	Furlong 17'; Mugridge 19'; Hawker 47'; Gowman 65'

Umpires:
Chahir Panschiri (SUI)
Ian Diamond (SCO)

6 September 2016
19:15

Scotland	5–0	Switzerland
Bain 18'; Coultas 26'; Forsyth 40', 60'; Imrie 59'	Report

Umpires:
Michael Eilmer (AUT)
Jamie Hooper (WAL)

7 September 2016
17:00

Portugal	1–4	Switzerland
Santos 43'	Report	Schwehr 13'; Hillmann 15'; Schneider 21'; Feller 58'

Umpires:
Shane O'Donnell (IRL)
Ian Diamond (SCO)

7 September 2016
19:15

Scotland	11–0	Slovakia
Bain 6', 26'; Anderson 21'; Imrie 41', 45'; Forsyth 44', 58', 70'; Coultas 58'; Marshall 63'; Fraser 69'	Report

Umpires:
Ricardo Fernandes (POR)
Chahir Panschiri (SUI)

8 September 2016
17:00

Switzerland	1–2	Wales
Hödle 31'	Report	Furlong 35'; Hawker 47'

Umpires:
Michael Eilmer (AUT)
Ricardo Fernandes (POR)

8 September 2016
19:15

Portugal	5–3	Slovakia
Tavares 12', 17'; Teixeira 43'; Ribeiro 53'; Coelho 67'	Report	Hruška 11'; Petráš 19'; Romanec 24'

Umpires:
Jamie Hooper (WAL)
Shane O'Donnell (IRL)

10 September 2016
12:00

Slovakia	1–10	Wales
Kovačević 40'	Report	Carson 9', 27'; Dolan-Gray 10'; Shipperley 21'; Francis 24', 50', 64', 67'; Kyriakides 51'; Furlong 60'

Umpires:
Ricardo Fernandes (POR)
Ian Diamond (SCO)

10 September 2016
14:15

Portugal	0–9	Scotland
	Report	Forsyth 5', 34'; Greaves 31'; Imrie 38'; Fraser 40'; Bain 42', 58'; Morton 46'; Riddell 54'

Umpires:
Jamie Hooper (WAL)
Chahir Panschiri (SUI)

11 September 2016
12:00

Slovakia	0–8	Switzerland
	Report	Wullschleger 17'; Hödle 32', 68'; Schwehr 35+'; Hillmann 41'; Wiss-Chodat 46'; Michel 55'; Marelli 66'

Umpires:
Shane O'Donnell (IRL)
Jamie Hooper (WAL)

11 September 2016
14:15

Scotland	2–3	Wales
Bain 14'; Forsyth 53'	Report	Furlong 2', 5'; Hutchinson 24'

Umpires:
Michael Eilmer (AUT)
Chahir Panschiri (SUI)

== Antalya ==
Hockey World League Round 1 – Antalya
Tournament details
- Host country: Turkey
- City: Antalya
- Dates: 9–11 September
- Teams: 4
- Venue: Gloria Sports Arena

Final positions
- Champions: Austria
- Runner-up: Oman
- Third place: Turkey

Tournament statistics
- Matches played: 6
- Goals scored: 45 (7.5 per match)
- Top scorer: (Austria) Michael Körper (10 goals)

All times are local (UTC+3).

=== Pool ===
Pos	Team	Pld	W	PW	PL	L	GF	GA	GD	Pts	Qualification
1	Austria	3	3	0	0	0	26	8	+18	9	Round 2
2	Oman	3	2	0	0	1	10	11	−1	6	
3	Turkey (H)	3	1	0	0	2	7	6	+1	3	
4	Qatar	3	0	0	0	3	2	20	−18	0	

Source: FIH
Rules for classification: 1) points; 2) goal difference; 3) goals scored; 4) head-to-head result.
(H) Host

9 September 2016
15:45

Oman	3–0	Qatar
Bait Jandal 18'; Al-Lawati 55'; Bait Rajiboon 67'	Report

Umpires:
Oliver Tarnoczi (AUT)
Ali Yıldırım (TUR)

9 September 2016
18:00

Austria	3–2	Turkey
Körper 5'; Uher 14', 63'	Report	Açıkgöz 46'; Kır 51'

Umpires:
Sebastien Duterme (BEL)
Ibrahim Al-Noufali (OMA)

10 September 2016
15:45

Oman	4–9	Austria
Al-Nofali 13', 56'; Bait Jandal 34', 65'	Report	B. Stanzl 3', 4', 15', 37'; Körper 28', 51', 70+'; Thörnblom 42'; Lindengrun 42'

Umpires:
Sebastien Duterme (BEL)
Abdou Mahmoud (QAT)

10 September 2016
18:00

Turkey	3–0	Qatar
Açıkgöz 22'; Cengiz 31', 61'	Report

Umpires:
Oliver Tarnoczi (AUT)
Ibrahim Al-Noufali (OMA)

11 September 2016
15:45

Austria	14–2	Qatar
Körper 4', 8', 19', 26', 56', 67'; Binder 16'; Uher 32', 57'; Rudofsky 35'; Schmidt 38'; P. Stanzl 39'; Lindengrun 65'; Bele 69'	Report	A. Muhammad 11'; Ali 24'

Umpires:
Ibrahim Al-Noufali (OMA)
Ali Yıldırım (TUR)

11 September 2016
18:00

Turkey	2–3	Oman
Özkiliç 33'; Erman 42'	Report	Al-Lawati 60'; Bait Jandal 69', 70'

Umpires:
Sebastien Duterme (BEL)
Abdou Mahmoud (QAT)

== Accra ==
Hockey World League Round 1 – Accra
Tournament details
- Host country: Ghana
- City: Accra
- Dates: 9–11 September
- Teams: 4

Final positions
- Champions: Ghana
- Runner-up: Kenya
- Third place: Nigeria

Tournament statistics
- Matches played: 6
- Goals scored: 28 (4.67 per match)
- Top scorer: (Kenya) Constant Wakhura (4 goals)

All times are local (UTC±0).

=== Pool ===
Pos	Team	Pld	W	PW	PL	L	GF	GA	GD	Pts	Qualification
1	Ghana (H)	3	3	0	0	0	10	2	+8	9	Round 2
2	Kenya	3	2	0	0	1	10	4	+6	6	
3	Nigeria	3	1	0	0	2	5	5	0	3	
4	Namibia	3	0	0	0	3	3	17	−14	0	

Source: FIH
Rules for classification: 1) points; 2) goal difference; 3) goals scored; 4) head-to-head result.
(H) Host

9 September 2016
17:30

Kenya	3–1	Nigeria
Mutria 8'; Wakhura 16'; Kanu 24'	Report	Salawu 25'

Umpires:
Aziz Adimah (GHA)
Siyabonga Martins (NAM)

9 September 2016
19:45

Ghana	7–1	Namibia
Ankomah 18'; Baah 24'; Baiden 26', 52'; Botsio 39'; Adjei 46'; Cofie 54'	Report	Jacobs 63'

Umpires:
Tony Fernandes (KEN)
Ahmed El-Sayed (EGY)

10 September 2016
17:30

Nigeria	3–0	Namibia
Mammam Kolo 9'; Salawu 36'; Mu'Azu 62'	Report

Umpires:
Tony Fernandes (KEN)
Aziz Adimah (GHA)

10 September 2016
19:45

Ghana	1–0	Kenya
Nsalbini 9'	Report

Umpires:
Ahmed El-Sayed (EGY)
Garba Asura (NGR)

11 September 2016
13:45

Kenya	7–2	Namibia
Wakhura 2', 51', 64'; Onyango 12'; Mutria 22'; Osiche 23', 34'	Report	Jeffery 8'; Jacobs 61'

Umpires:
Aziz Adimah (GHA)
Ahmed El-Sayed (EGY)

11 September 2016
16:00

Nigeria	1–2	Ghana
John 14'	Report	Ankomah 54'; Baah 64'

Umpires:
Tony Fernandes (KEN)
Siyabonga Martins (NAM)

== Salamanca ==
Hockey World League Round 1 – Salamanca
Tournament details
- Host country: Mexico
- City: Salamanca
- Dates: 27 September – 2 October
- Teams: 4
- Venue: Deportivo Sur

Final positions
- Champions: United States
- Runner-up: Barbados
- Third place: Mexico

Tournament statistics
- Matches played: 8
- Goals scored: 70 (8.75 per match)
- Top scorer: (United States) William Holt (11 goals)

All times are local (UTC−6).

=== Pool ===
Pos	Team	Pld	W	PW	PL	L	GF	GA	GD	Pts	Qualification
1	United States	3	3	0	0	0	27	1	+26	9	Final
2	Barbados	3	2	0	0	1	14	4	+10	6	Final
3	Mexico (H)	3	1	0	0	2	8	4	+4	3	
4	Guatemala	3	0	0	0	3	0	40	−40	0	

Source: FIH
Rules for classification: 1) points; 2) goal difference; 3) goals scored; 4) head-to-head result.
(H) Host

27 September 2016
11:45

United States	3–1	Barbados
Molcsan 37'; Holt 40', 49'	Report	Small 42'

Umpires:
Donovan Simmons (BER)
Luis Cardona (GUA)

27 September 2016
16:45

Mexico	7–0	Guatemala
Estrada 3'; Gómez 7'; Arballo 22', 56'; Rangel 50'; Ri. García 53'; Castillo 63'	Report

Umpires:
Ridge Bair (USA)
Shane Lewis (BAR)

28 September 2016
16:45

Mexico	0–2	United States
	Report	Cicchi 53'; Singh 62'

Umpires:
Shane Lewis (BAR)
Luis Cardona (GUA)

29 September 2016
14:30

Barbados	11–0	Guatemala
Rudder 5', 28', 34', 42'; Moore 5', 12'; Warner 18', 23', 35', 44'; Wharton 59'	Report

Umpires:
Jonathan Altamirano (MEX)
Donovan Simmons (BER)

1 October 2016
12:15

United States	22–0	Guatemala
Holt 3', 5', 16', 39', 58'; Sundeen 7', 55'; Molcsan 8'; Martinez 14'; Dhadwal 29', 46', 52'; Barminski 32'; Orozco 35+'; Singh 36'; Grassi 57', 68'; Barratt 62', 69'; Kokolakis 66', 67'; Cicchi 70+'	Report

Umpires:
Jonathan Altamirano (MEX)
Donovan Simmons (BER)

1 October 2016
16:45

Barbados	2–1	Mexico
Rudder 28'; Franklin 34'	Report	Lemus 13'

Umpires:
Ridge Bair (USA)
Luis Cardona (GUA)

=== Third place game ===
2 October 2016
14:30

Mexico	14–0	Guatemala
Terminel 10', 33', 38', 60'; Ri. García 21'; Fimbres 24'; Baez 35', 43'; Gómez 39', 40'; Arballo 46', 53', 63'; Rangel 51'	Report

Umpires:
Shane Lewis (BAR)
Ridge Bair (USA)

=== Final ===
2 October 2016
16:45

United States	6–1	Barbados
Singh 5'; Holt 8', 20', 42'; Martinez 13'; Dhadwal 46'	Report	Franklin 48'

Umpires:
Donovan Simmons (BER)
Jonathan Altamirano (MEX)

=== Final ranking ===
Qualified for Round 2

Rank	Team
Gold medal	United States
Silver medal	Barbados
Bronze medal	Mexico
4	Guatemala

== Chiclayo ==
Hockey World League Round 1 – Chiclayo
2016 South American Championship

Tournament details
- Host country: Peru
- City: Chiclayo
- Dates: 1–9 October
- Teams: 6

Final positions
- Champions: Chile (1st title)
- Runner-up: Venezuela
- Third place: Uruguay

Tournament statistics
- Matches played: 15
- Goals scored: 129 (8.6 per match)
- Top scorer: (Venezuela) Cristian Vargas (12 goals)

This Round 1 event also was the fifth edition of the Men's South American Hockey Championship.

All times are local (UTC−6).

=== Pool ===
Pos	Team	Pld	W	PW	PL	L	GF	GA	GD	Pts	Qualification
1	Chile	5	5	0	0	0	44	0	+44	15	Round 2
2	Venezuela	5	4	0	0	1	31	6	+25	12	
3	Uruguay	5	3	0	0	2	25	9	+16	9	
4	Paraguay	5	1	1	0	3	13	20	−7	5	
5	Peru (H)	5	1	0	1	3	15	19	−4	4	
6	Ecuador	5	0	0	0	5	1	75	−74	0	

Source: FIH
Rules for classification: 1) points; 2) goal difference; 3) goals scored; 4) head-to-head result.
(H) Host

1 October 2016
09:00

Venezuela	7–2	Paraguay
Adrian 11'; C. Vargas 15', 42', 45', 70'; Barcamonte 42'; W. Vargas 46'	Report	Russo 25', 57'

Umpires:
Daniel López (URU)
Reinier Díaz (CUB)

1 October 2016
11:15

Chile	24–0	Ecuador
Dummer 3', 6', 25', 30', 57'; Berczely 4', 18', 28', 54'; Amoroso 8', 60', 69'; A. Richter 13', 39'; Goni 14'; Achondo 16'; Rodríguez 18', 33', 49'; S. Richter 22', 32'; Renz 40'; Maldonado 43'; Contardo 69'	Report

Umpires:
Maximilliano Scala (ARG)
Manuel Sierra (VEN)

1 October 2016
15:00

Uruguay	3–2	Peru
A. López 24'; Draper 28'; Laborde 42'	Report	Corno 23'; Vives 46'

Umpires:
Gus Soteriades (USA)
Hugo Romero (PAR)

3 October 2016
09:00

Chile	8–0	Peru
Amoroso 20'; Dummer 25', 58'; Ritcher 30'; Renz 50'; Contardo 55', 64'; Berczely 62'	Report

Umpires:
Hugo Romero (PAR)
Manuel Sierra (VEN)

3 October 2016
11:15

Uruguay	5–0	Paraguay
A. López 1', 41'; Laborde 17', 22'; G. López 52'	Report

Umpires:
Rodrigo Rivadeneira (PER)
Guillermo Poblete (CHI)

3 October 2016
15:00

Ecuador	0–16	Venezuela
	Report	C. Vargas 8', 22', 30', 44', 54', 55'; Ramos 9'; Adrian 13', 17', 19', 32'; Laya 25'; Simanca 34', 56'; W. Vargas 45'; Bracamonte 53'

Umpires:
Gus Soteriades (USA)
Maximilliano Scala (ARG)

5 October 2016
09:00

Ecuador	0–16	Uruguay
	Report	G. López 9', 25'; Tixe 18', 47'; Martinoni 20', 59'; Cantaro 28', 66'; A. López 37', 52', 57'; Salmini 44'; Rivero 51', 54', 61'; Maz 65'

Umpires:
Guillermo Poblete (CHI)
Hugo Romero (PAR)

5 October 2016
11:15

Venezuela	0–2	Chile
	Report	Achondo 7'; A. Richter 41'

Umpires:
Reinier Díaz (CUB)
Rodrigo Rivadeneira (PER)

5 October 2016
15:00

Paraguay	2–2	Peru
Samudio 20'; Russo 59'	Report	Rivera 2'; Corno 48'
Penalties
Monges (penalty shoot-out scored); Benítez (penalty shoot-out missed); Chamorro (penalty shoot-out missed); Ruetalo (penalty shoot-out scored); Dolinzky (penalty shoot-out missed); Chamorro (penalty shoot-out scored)	3–2	(penalty shoot-out scored) Corno; (penalty shoot-out missed) De Martis; (penalty shoot-out missed) Cruz; (penalty shoot-out scored) Dennison; (penalty shoot-out missed) Rivera; (penalty shoot-out missed) Corno

Umpires:
Daniel López (URU)
Manuel Sierra (VEN)

7 October 2016
09:00

Paraguay	9–1	Ecuador
Russo 18', 53'; Monges 36'; Giménez 39'; Ruetalo 45', 68'; Vera 58'; Dolinzky 62'; Benegas 65'	Report	Soria 42'

Umpires:
Guillermo Poblete (CHI)
Daniel López (URU)

7 October 2016
11:15

Uruguay	0–5	Chile
	Report	Contardo 25', 35+', 61'; Rodríguez 40'; Purcell 49'

Umpires:
Gus Soteriades (USA)
Maximilliano Scala (ARG)

7 October 2016
15:00

Peru	1–6	Venezuela
De Martis 37'	Report	Oropeza 11', 58'; Malave 39'; Adrian 48'; Simanca 54'; Vargas 64'

Umpires:
Hugo Romero (PAR)
Reinier Díaz (CUB)

9 October 2016
09:00

Venezuela	2–1	Uruguay
Adrian 41'; Vargas 69'	Report	A. López 49'

Umpires:
Maximilliano Scala (ARG)
Rodrigo Rivadeneira (PER)

9 October 2016
11:15

Chile	5–0	Paraguay
Contardo 8'; A. Richter 25', 38'; Ordoñez 35+'; Amoroso 62'	Report

Umpires:
Manuel Sierra (VEN)
Reinier Díaz (CUB)

9 October 2016
15:00

Peru	10–0	Ecuador
Corno 9', 30'; Dennison 11', 31', 38', 40'; Del Valle 43'; Rivera 46'; Talaevra 60', 69'	Report

Umpires:
Guillermo Poblete (CHI)
Gus Soteriades (USA)
