= Field hockey at the 2026 Asian Games – Men's team squads =

Twelve national teams are competing in the men's field hockey tournament at the 2026 Asian Games in Japan. A maximum of eighteen players are officially enrolled in each squad.

== Pool A ==
=== Bangladesh ===
The following is the Bangladesh roster in the men's field hockey tournament of the 2026 Asian Games.

Head coach: (Germany) Gerhard Rach

2. Ashraful Islam
3. Farhad Ahmed
4. Khaled Rakin
6. Roman Sarkar (C)
7. Rashel Mahmud
9. Puskar Khisa
10. Mainul Islam
11. Rakibul Hasan
12. Obidul Joy
13. Rezaul Babu
14. Shahidur Saju
16. Md. Deen Emon
17. Amirul Islam
18. Hozifa Hossain
21. Ashraful Shad (GK)
22. Biplob Kujur (GK)
27. Mahbub Hossain
75. Md Shohanur Rahman

=== India ===
The following is the India roster in the men's field hockey tournament of the 2026 Asian Games.

Head coach: (South Africa) Craig Fulton

4. Jarmanpreet Singh
5. Abhishek
7. Manpreet Singh
8. Hardik Singh
9. Dilpreet Singh
11. Mandeep Singh
13. Harmanpreet Singh (C)
17. Sumit
18. Nilakanta Sharma
25. Raj Kumar Pal
27. Mohith Shashikumar Honnenahalli (GK)
30. Amit Rohidas
31. Jugraj Singh
32. Vivek Sagar Prasad
34. Sukhjeet Singh
47. Yashdeep Siwach
70. Sanjay
77. Suraj Karkera (GK)
78. Rajinder Singh
99. Shilanand Lakra

=== Indonesia ===
The following is the Indonesia roster in the men's field hockey tournament of the 2026 Asian Games.

Head coach: (Malaysia) Dharma Raj Kanniah

3. Fadli Muhamad
4. Asrul Alam
5. Ferdian Rahman
7. Khaerulloh Akmal
10. Ahdan Asasi
12. Alam Fajar (GK)
13. Revo Priliandro
14. Julius Rumaropen (GK)
15. Alfandy Prastyo
16. Suharyana
17. Jerry Efendi
18. Muhammad Firdaus
19. Mochamad Fathur
20. Arthur Wibowo
21. Nurul Maulana
23. Aulia Al Ardh (C)
25. Adi Leksono
27. Andrea Guntara

=== Japan ===
The following is the Japan roster in the men's field hockey tournament of the 2026 Asian Games.

Head coach: (Japan) Yoshihiro Anai

1. Koji Yamasaki
2. Shota Yamada
4. Yamato Kawahara
5. Seren Tanaka
6. Naru Kimura
7. Jun Watanabe
8. Taiki Takade
9. Kosei Kawabe
11. Kazumasa Matsumoto
12. Yuma Nagai
13. Manabu Yamashita
14. Raiki Fujishima (C)
16. Hiro Saito
18. Tsubasa Tanaka
19. Ryoma Ooka
22. Kaito Tanaka
23. Yusuke Kawamura
29. Takumi Kitagawa (GK)
30. Takashi Yoshikawa (GK)
38. Hyota Yamada

=== South Korea ===
The following is the South Korea roster in the men's field hockey tournament of the 2026 Asian Games.

Head coach: (South Korea) Min Taeseok

1. Kim Jae-hyeon (GK)
4. Kim Kyu-beom
6. Yang Ji-hun (C)
7. Sim Jae-won
8. Rim Jin-kang
9. Kim Jae-ho
10. Kim Yong-bok
11. Park Cheol-eon
12. Lee Gang-san
15. Lim Do-hyun
17. Oh Se-yong
19. Son Da-in
23. Kim Hyeong-jin
24. Bae Soung-min
27. Jin Geon-hyo
28. Kim Hyeon-hong
30. Lee Seung-woo
32. Kim Jae-han (GK)
49. Choi Chan-kyu
51. Lee Hye-seung

=== Sri Lanka ===
The following is the Sri Lanka roster in the men's field hockey tournament of the 2026 Asian Games.

Head coach: (Sri Lanka) Rifas Mohamed

1. Alwis Wathuthantrege
2. Daammika Ranasingha
3. Sameera Weerasuriya
4. Ross Fernando
7. Suren Bothale
9. Sandaruwan Batuvita
10. Rajitha Kulathunga (C)
11. Sanda Sudusinghe
12. Demian Karunamunige
14. Udayashan Fernando
15. Madumal Palle
17. Seran Bothale
19. Kusal Weerappuli
23. Madushan Herath
27. Maleesha Madurawalage
28. Nilaksha Visidagamage (GK)
29. Tharindu Hendeniya (GK)
30. Suresh Rathnayake

== Pool B ==
=== China ===
The following is the China roster in the men's field hockey tournament of the 2026 Asian Games.

Head coach: (Australia) Anthony Farry

1. Guan Quyang
2. Chen Qijun
3. Gao Jiesheng
5. Meng Yuanfeng (C)
6. Chen Chongcong (C)
7. Zhang Xiaojia
8. Meng Dihao
11. Chen Benhai
17. Meng Nan
18. Wang Yaqi
20. Su Rui
21. Ao Xu
23. Du Shihao
27. He Yonghua
28. Zhang Jialiang
30. Wang Weihao (GK)
33. Chen Chengfu
66. Lin Changliang
77. Zhao Yulai
99. Zhang Pengyang (GK)

=== Malaysia ===
The following is the Malaysia roster in the men's field hockey tournament of the 2026 Asian Games.

Head coach: (South Africa) Brendon Carolan

6. Marhan Jalil (C)
7. Fitri Saari
10. Faizal Saari
11. Akhimullah Anuar
15. Shello Silverius
16. Zaimi Mat Deris (GK)
18. Faiz Jali
20. Ashran Hamsani
21. Hafizuddin Othman (GK)
22. Norsyafiq Sumantri
23. Abu Kamal Azrai
24. Aiman Rozemi
26. Muhajir Abdu Rauf
27. Shafiq Hassan
29. Amirul Azahar
30. Faris Harizan
31. Azimuddin Kamaruddin
32. Aminuddin Mohd Zain
35. Andywalfian Jeffrynus
46. Nur Aqilrullah Che

=== Oman ===
The following is the Oman roster in the men's field hockey tournament of the 2026 Asian Games.

Head coach: (Oman) Mohammed Bait Jandal

1. Aliyas Al-Noufali
2. Asama Barazahan
3. Shamaiaa Akram Bait
5. Usama Bait
6. Khalid Al-Shaaibi (C)
10. Aiman Madit
11. Mohammed Al-Noufali
13. Alkhoder Al-Noufali
14. Sanad Sbeit
15. Fisal Alloun
16. Maitham Al-Wahaibi
17. Aseel Al-Maaini
19. Khalid Al-Hasni
20. Fahad Al-Lawati
22. Ahmed Al-Naabi (GK)
23. Rashad Al-Fazari (C)
25. Rashid Al-Alawi
26. Ibrahim Al-Farsi (GK)
28. Said Al-Fazari
30. Al Baraa Al-Nofli

=== Pakistan ===
The following is the Pakistan roster in the men's field hockey tournament of the 2026 Asian Games.

Head coach: (Netherlands) Herman Kruis

1. Waqar Ali (GK)
2. Muhammad Abdullah
5. Sufyan Khan
7. Moin Shakeel
8. Waheed Rana
9. Hannan Shahid
10. Zikriya Hayat
11. Arshad Liaqat
13. Adeel Latif
14. Ahmad Nadeem
15. Ghazanfar Ali
16. Ammad Butt
17. Muhammad Hammadudin
18. Abdul Rehman
21. Afraz Hakeem
24. Umar Mustafa
27. Abu Mahmood (C)
31. Ali Raza (GK)
32. Abdul Manan
35. Muhammad Ammad

=== Thailand ===
The following is the Thailand roster in the men's field hockey tournament of the 2026 Asian Games.

Head Coach: (Malaysia) Tai Beng Hai

5. Kritsada Chueamkaew
8. Narentorn Deesa
9. Udomchok Phokphun
10. Jiranat Sae-Aew
11. Nopphadon Samarng
12. Pichet Chaimanee
13. Worawut Kaeochianghwang
14. Warakorn Kiram
15. Natthawat Kuengsamrong
16. Nithikon Mongsri
19. Arfis Hayeeda-Oh
20. Borirak Harapan
22. Chanachol Rungniyom
23. Suriya Kasonbua
28. Kankawee Boonsri
29. Tanakit Juntakian (C)
31. Patinya Panseemek (GK)
32. Thawin Phomjunt (GK)
33. Kunakorn Jaitas
38. Konlawat Khammi

=== Uzbekistan ===
The following is the Uzbekistan roster in the men's field hockey tournament of the 2026 Asian Games.

Head Coach:

1. Davlat Tolibbaev (GK)
4. Islombek Mamajonov
5. Azizbek Ibrokhimov
7. Shavkatbek Mirzakarimov
9. Shokhrukhbek Salimjonov
10. Mukhammadkarim Aslanov
11. Ruzimukhammad Nazirov
12. Gaybullo Khaytboev (C)
14. Khakimboy Khakimov
15. Azamatkhon Abboskhonov
18. Fozilbek Husanov
19. Jamshidbek Komilov
20. Nodirbek Yuldashev
21. Gayratbek Ganiev (GK)
22. Bakhodirjon Abdurakhmonov
44. Asadbek Asliddinov
77. Fakhriddin Saydullaev
99. Doston Sotlikov
