= Field hockey at the Asian Games =

Field Hockey at the Asian Games
- Current season, competition or edition: Field hockey at the 2026 Asian Games
- Sport: Field hockey
- Founded: 1958; 68 years ago
- First season: 1958
- Organising body: OCA
- No. of teams: M: 12; W: 12
- Confederation: Asia
- Most recent champions: M: India (5th title); W: India (2nd title)
- Most titles: M: Pakistan (8 titles); W: South Korea (5 titles)

Field hockey is an Asian Games event since the 1958 Games in Tokyo, Japan. The women's competition has been held since the 1982 Games in New Delhi, India. The Games have a qualification since 2006 / 2010 for men and women. India men's and India women's teams are the defending champions of the men's and women's disciplines, respectively. 2026 Aichi-Nagoya marked the first time India had won both events in a single edition.

Since the 1990 Asian Games, the men's field hockey tournament has served as a direct qualification pathway for the Olympic Games, with the Asian Games champion earning an Olympic berth and since the 1998 Asian Games, the women's field hockey tournament has served as a direct qualification pathway for the Olympics, with the Asian Games champion earning an Olympic berth.

== Men's tournament ==
=== Results ===
#	Year	Host	Gold medal match			Bronze medal match			Teams
#	Year	Host	Gold medal	Score	Silver medal	Bronze medal	Score	Fourth place	Teams
1	1958	Tokyo, Japan	Pakistan	No playoffs	India	South Korea	No playoffs	Malaya	5
2	1962	Jakarta, Indonesia	Pakistan	2–0	India	Malaya	2–0	Japan	9
3	1966	Bangkok, Thailand	India	1–0 (a.e.t.)	Pakistan	Japan	1–0	Malaysia	8
4	1970	Bangkok, Thailand	Pakistan	1–0 (a.e.t.)	India	Japan	1–0	Malaysia	8
5	1974	Tehran, Iran	Pakistan	2–0	India	Malaysia	3–1	Japan	6
6	1978	Bangkok, Thailand	Pakistan	1–0	India	Malaysia	2–1	Japan	8
7	1982	New Delhi, India	Pakistan	7–1	India	Malaysia	3–0	Japan	9
8	1986	Seoul, South Korea	South Korea	2–1	Pakistan	India	4–1	Malaysia	9
9	1990	Beijing, China	Pakistan	No playoffs	India	Malaysia	No playoffs	South Korea	7
10	1994	Hiroshima, Japan	South Korea	3–2	India	Pakistan	6–0	Japan	9
11	1998	Bangkok, Thailand	India	1–1 (a.e.t.) (4–2 p.s.o.)	South Korea	Pakistan	3–0	Japan	10
12	2002	Busan, South Korea	South Korea	4–3	India	Malaysia	1–1 (a.e.t.) (4–2 p.s.o.)	Pakistan	8
13	2006	Doha, Qatar	South Korea	3–1	China	Pakistan	4–2	Japan	10
14	2010	Guangzhou, China	Pakistan	2–0	Malaysia	India	1–0	South Korea	10
15	2014	Incheon, South Korea	India	1–1 (4–2 p.s.o.)	Pakistan	South Korea	3–2	Malaysia	10
16	2018	Jakarta, Indonesia	Japan	6–6 (3–1 p.s.o.)	Malaysia	India	2–1	Pakistan	12
17	2022	Hangzhou, China	India	5–1	Japan	South Korea	2–1	China	12
18	2026	Nagoya, Japan	India	5–1	Malaysia	Pakistan	5–3	South Korea	12

=== Summary ===
Team	Gold medal	Silver medal	Bronze medal	Fourth place
Pakistan	8 (1958, 1962, 1970, 1974, 1978, 1982, 1990, 2010)	3 (1966, 1986, 2014)	4 (1994, 1998, 2006, 2026)	2 (2002, 2018)
India	5 (1966, 1998, 2014, 2022, 2026)	9 (1958, 1962, 1970, 1974, 1978, 1982*, 1990, 1994, 2002)	3 (1986, 2010, 2018)	
South Korea	4 (1986*, 1994, 2002*, 2006)	1 (1998)	3 (1958, 2014*, 2022)	3 (1990, 2010, 2026)
Japan	1 (2018)	1 (2022)	2 (1966, 1970)	7 (1962, 1974, 1978, 1982, 1994*, 1998, 2006)
Malaysia		3 (2010, 2018, 2026)	6 (1962, 1974, 1978, 1982, 1990, 2002)	5 (1958, 1966, 1970, 1986, 2014)
China		1 (2006)		1 (2022*)

* = hosts

=== Team appearances ===
Team	(Japan) 1958	(Indonesia) 1962	(Thailand) 1966	(Thailand) 1970	(Iran) 1974	(Thailand) 1978	(India) 1982	(South Korea) 1986	(China) 1990	(Japan) 1994	(Thailand) 1998	(South Korea) 2002	(Qatar) 2006	(China) 2010	(South Korea) 2014	(Indonesia) 2018	(China) 2022	(Japan) 2026	Total
Bangladesh	part of Pakistan				–	6th	9th	7th	–	7th	9th	7th	7th	8th	8th	6th	8th	7th	12
China	–	–	–	–	–	–	6th	–	5th	8th	6th	5th	2nd	5th	5th	–	4th	6th	10
Chinese Taipei	–	–	–	–	–	–	–	–	–	–	–	–	8th	–	–	–	–	–	1
Hong Kong	–	6th	7th	7th	–	5th	8th	6th	7th	–	8th	8th	9th	9th	–	12th	–	–	12
India	2nd	2nd	1st	2nd	2nd	2nd	2nd	3rd	2nd	2nd	1st	2nd	5th	3rd	1st	3rd	1st	1st	18
Indonesia	–	9th	–	–	–	–	–	–	–	–	–	–	–	–	–	10th	9th	12th	4
Iran	–	–	–	–	6th	–	–	–	–	–	–	–	–	–	–	–	–	–	1
Japan	5th	4th	3rd	3rd	4th	4th	4th	5th	6th	4th	4th	6th	4th	6th	6th	1st	2nd	5th	18
Kazakhstan	part of Soviet Union									6th	–	–	–	–	–	11th	–	–	2
Malaysia	4th	3rd	4th	4th	3rd	3rd	3rd	4th	3rd	5th	5th	3rd	6th	2nd	4th	2nd	6th	2nd	18
Oman	–	–	–	–	–	–	7th	8th	–	9th	–	–	10th	7th	7th	7th	7th	11th	9
Pakistan	1st	1st	2nd	1st	1st	1st	1st	2nd	1st	3rd	3rd	4th	3rd	1st	2nd	4th	5th	3rd	18
Singapore	–	5th	–	5th	–	–	–	–	–	–	7th	–	–	10th	9th	–	12th	–	6
South Korea	3rd	8th	6th	–	–	–	5th	1st	4th	1st	2nd	1st	1st	4th	3rd	5th	3rd	4th	15
Sri Lanka	–	7th	5th	6th	5th	7th	–	–	–	–	–	–	–	–	10th	8th	–	9th	8
Thailand	–	–	8th	8th	–	8th	–	9th	–	–	10th	–	–	–	–	9th	11th	8th	8
Uzbekistan	part of Soviet Union									–	–	–	–	–	–	–	10th	10th	2
Total (17)	5	9	8	8	6	8	9	9	7	9	10	8	10	10	10	12	12	12	_

== Women's tournament ==
=== Results ===
#	Year	Host	Gold medal match			Bronze medal match			Teams
#	Year	Host	Gold medal	Score	Silver medal	Bronze medal	Score	Fourth place	Teams
1	1982	New Delhi, India	India	No playoffs	South Korea	Malaysia	No playoffs	Japan	6
2	1986	Seoul, South Korea	South Korea	No playoffs	Japan	India	No playoffs	Malaysia	6
3	1990	Beijing, China	South Korea	No playoffs	China	Japan	No playoffs	India	6
4	1994	Hiroshima, Japan	South Korea	No playoffs	Japan	China	No playoffs	India	6
5	1998	Bangkok, Thailand	South Korea	2–1	India	China	2–0	Japan	7
6	2002	Busan, South Korea	China	2–1	South Korea	Japan	2–0	India	4
7	2006	Doha, Qatar	China	1–0	Japan	India	1–0	South Korea	7
8	2010	Guangzhou, China	China	0–0 (a.e.t.) (5–4 p.s.o.)	South Korea	Japan	1–0 (a.e.t.)	India	7
9	2014	Incheon, South Korea	South Korea	1–0	China	India	2–1	Japan	8
10	2018	Jakarta, Indonesia	Japan	2–1	India	China	2–1	South Korea	10
11	2022	Hangzhou, China	China	2–0	South Korea	India	2–1	Japan	10
12	2026	Nagoya, Japan	India	1–0	China	Japan	0–0 (4–2 p.s.o.)	South Korea	12

=== Summary ===
Team	Gold medal	Silver medal	Bronze medal	Fourth place
South Korea	5 (1986*, 1990, 1994, 1998, 2014*)	4 (1982, 2002*, 2010, 2022)		3 (2006, 2018, 2026)
China	4 (2002, 2006, 2010*, 2022*)	3 (1990*, 2014, 2026)	3 (1994, 1998, 2018)	
India	2 (1982*, 2026)	2 (1998, 2018)	4 (1986, 2006, 2014, 2022)	4 (1990, 1994, 2002, 2010)
Japan	1 (2018)	3 (1986, 1994*, 2006)	4 (1990, 2002, 2010, 2026*)	4 (1982, 1998, 2014, 2022)
Malaysia			1 (1982)	1 (1986)

* = hosts

=== Team appearances ===
Team	(India) 1982	(South Korea) 1986	(China) 1990	(Japan) 1994	(Thailand) 1998	(South Korea) 2002	(Qatar) 2006	(China) 2010	(South Korea) 2014	(Indonesia) 2018	(China) 2022	(Japan) 2026	Total
Bangladesh	–	–	–	–	–	–	–	–	–	–	–	9th	1
China	–	–	2nd	3rd	3rd	1st	1st	1st	2nd	3rd	1st	2nd	10
Chinese Taipei	–	–	–	–	–	–	6th	–	–	8th	–	7th	3
Hong Kong	6th	6th	–	–	–	–	7th	–	8th	9th	9th	–	6
India	1st	3rd	4th	4th	2nd	4th	3rd	4th	3rd	2nd	3rd	1st	12
Indonesia	–	–	–	–	–	–	–	–	–	7th	10th	8th	3
Japan	4th	2nd	3rd	2nd	4th	3rd	2nd	3rd	4th	1st	4th	3rd	12
Kazakhstan	part of Soviet Union			–	6th	–	–	7th	6th	10th	8th	11th	6
Malaysia	3rd	4th	–	–	–	–	5th	5th	5th	5th	5th	5th	8
North Korea	–	–	5th	–	–	–	–	–	–	–	–	–	1
Singapore	5th	–	6th	6th	–	–	–	–	–	–	7th	10th	5
South Korea	2nd	1st	1st	1st	1st	2nd	4th	2nd	1st	4th	2nd	4th	12
Thailand	–	5th	–	–	7th	–	–	6th	7th	6th	6th	6th	7
Uzbekistan	part of Soviet Union			5th	5th	–	–	–	–	–	–	12th	3
Total (14)	6	6	6	6	7	4	7	7	8	10	10	12	_

== Medal tables ==
=== Total ===
Rank	Nation	Gold	Silver	Bronze	Total
1	South Korea (KOR)	9	5	3	17
2	Pakistan (PAK)	8	3	4	15
3	India (IND)	7	11	7	25
4	China (CHN)	4	4	3	11
5	Japan (JPN)	2	4	6	12
6	Malaysia (MAS)	0	3	7	10
Totals (6 entries)		30	30	30	90

=== Men ===
Rank	Nation	Gold	Silver	Bronze	Total
1	Pakistan	8	3	4	15
2	India	5	9	3	17
3	South Korea	4	1	3	8
4	Japan	1	1	2	4
5	Malaysia	0	3	6	9
6	China	0	1	0	1
Totals (6 entries)		18	18	18	54

=== Women ===
Rank	Nation	Gold	Silver	Bronze	Total
1	South Korea	5	4	0	9
2	China	4	3	3	10
3	India	2	2	4	8
4	Japan	1	3	4	8
5	Malaysia	0	0	1	1
Totals (5 entries)		12	12	12	36

== Asian Games records ==
=== Men ===
- Most appearances: India, Malaysia and Pakistan (18 appearances) – Aichi–Nagoya 2026
- Most consecutive appearances: India, Malaysia and Pakistan (18 appearances) – Aichi–Nagoya 2026
- Most medals: India (17 medals) – Aichi–Nagoya 2026
- Most titles: Pakistan (8 titles) – Guangzhou 2010
- Biggest margin of victory: India 26–0 Hong Kong – Jakarta –Palembang 2018
- Biggest margin of victory at an Asian Games final: Pakistan 7–1 India – Delhi 1982
- Most goals scored: Pakistan (551 goals) – Aichi–Nagoya 2026
- Most goals scored in a single tournament: India (80 goals) – Jakarta –Palembang 2018
- Most goals scored by a player: Jang Jong-Hyun, South Korea (62 goals) – Hangzhou 2022
- Most goals scored by a player in a single tournament: Jang Jong-Hyun, South Korea (18 goals) – Hangzhou 2022
- Most goals scored by a player in a single match: Shehnaz Sheikh, Pakistan – Bangkok 1978 and Jang Jong-Hyun, South Korea – Doha 2006 (7 goals)
- Most penalty-corner goals scored by a player in a single match: Jang Jong-Hyun, South Korea – Doha 2006 (7 goals)
- Most goals by a player in an Asian Games final: Tengku Ahmad Tajuddin, Malaysia (3 goals) – Jakarta–Palembang 2018

=== Women ===
- Most appearances: India, Japan and South Korea (12 appearances) – Aichi–Nagoya 2026
- Most consecutive appearances: India, Japan and South Korea (12 appearances) – Aichi–Nagoya 2026
- Most medals: China (10 medals) – Aichi–Nagoya 2026
- Most titles: South Korea (5 titles) – Doha 2006
- Biggest margin of victory: India 22–0 Hong Kong – Delhi 1982
- Biggest margin of victory at an Asian Games final: China 2–0 South Korea – Hangzhou 2022
- Most goals scored: India (301 goals) – Aichi–Nagoya 2026
- Most goals scored in a single tournament: India (69 goals) – Aichi–Nagoya 2026
- Most goals scored by a player: Deepika Sehrawat, India (26 goals) – Aichi–Nagoya 2026
- Most goals scored by a player in a single tournament: Deepika Sehrawat, India (21 goals) – Aichi–Nagoya 2026
- Most goals scored by a player in a single match: Deepika Sehrawat, India (9 goals) – Aichi–Nagoya 2026
- Most penalty-corner goals scored by a player in a single match: Deepika Sehrawat, India (9 goals) – Aichi–Nagoya 2026

== See also ==
- Indoor hockey at the Asian Indoor and Martial Arts Games
- Men's Hockey Asia Cup
- Women's Hockey Asia Cup
