= 2025 AHF Men's Central Asia Cup =

Tournament details
- Host country: Uzbekistan
- City: Tashkent
- Dates: 11–17 October
- Teams: 5 (from 1 confederation)
- Venue: Uzbekistan Olympic City Hockey Pitch

Final positions
- Champions: Kazakhstan (2nd title)
- Runner-up: Uzbekistan
- Third place: Hong Kong

Tournament statistics
- Matches played: 10
- Goals scored: 211 (21.1 per match)
- Top scorer(s): (Hong Kong) Felix Chi Him Iu (Uzbekistan) Agymtay Duisengazy (18 goals)

The 2025 AHF Men's Central Asia Cup was the third edition of the AHF Men's Central Asia Cup, the international men's field hockey championship of Central Asia. It was held in Tashkent, Uzbekistan from 11 to 17 October 2025.

== Teams ==
The following five teams, shown with pre-tournament FIH World Rankings, participated in the tournament.

- Hong Kong (42)
- Kazakhstan (79)
- Kyrgyzstan (98)
- Tajikistan (97)
- Uzbekistan (63)

== Results ==
All times are local (UTC+5).

=== Standings ===
Pos	Team	Pld	W	D	L	GF	GA	GD	Pts
1	Kazakhstan	4	4	0	0	71	7	+64	12
2	Uzbekistan (H)	4	3	0	1	61	7	+54	9
3	Hong Kong	4	2	0	2	70	7	+63	6
4	Tajikistan	4	1	0	3	9	56	−47	3
5	Kyrgyzstan	4	0	0	4	0	134	−134	0

Source: FIH
Rules for classification: 1) points; 2) matches won; 3) goal difference; 4) goals for; 5) head-to-head result; 6) field goals scored.
(H) Hosts

11 October 2025
10:30

Kazakhstan	22–0	Tajikistan
Aitkaliyev 2', 4', 41', 47'; Zhanat 3'; Yerali 5', 17', 31', 38', 47'; Duissengazy 27'; Yelubayev 29', 37', 53', 56', 57', 58', 60'; Duisengazy 33'; Dautaliyev 39', 52'; Yestemessov 43'	Report

Umpires:
Khalid Hussain (HKG)
Yiu Ho King (HKG)

11 October 2025
12:45

Uzbekistan	35–0	Kyrgyzstan
Komilov 3', 22'; Karimov 3', 12', 26'; Abboskhonov 12', 15', 23'; Khaytboev 13', 15', 19', 28', 30', 34', 35'; Salimjonov 13'; Husanov 17', 28', 29', 38', 39', 48'; Mirzakarimov 21', 37', 39', 40', 44', 47', 47'; Ruslanov 23'; Sotlikov 30', 38', 51'; Khamitov 45', 46'	Report

Umpires:
Tianhe Ren (CHN)
Adilzhan Kudaibergen (KAZ)

12 October 2025
12:45

Hong Kong	50–0	Kyrgyzstan
Au 1', 12', 19', 42'; U. Singh 1', 5', 16', 33'; Ho 2', 32'; K. Chan 5'; Y. Chan 6', 11', 36', 37', 38', 42', 43'; Chuen 9', 34', 52'; Iu 12', 15', 17', 19', 21', 29', 30', 39', 44'; Iu (continued) 44', 45', 48', 60'; Qismat 18', 30'; Chueng 24', 35', 41', 41', 45', 47', 48', 52'; Ali 24'; Ahmed 26'; Tsang 28', 59'; A. Singh 31'; Kwok 54'	Report

Umpires:
Elyor Kholmirzaev (UZB)
Abdulaziz Abdulkhakimov (UZB)

13 October 2025
10:30

Kazakhstan	4–3	Hong Kong
Duisengazy 32', 41'; Yerali 36', 56'	Report	Ali 20'; Iu 37'; Chan 52'

Umpires:
Elyor Kholmirzaev (UZB)
Abdulaziz Abdulkhakimov (UZB)

13 October 2025
12:45

Uzbekistan	19–0	Tajikistan
Khaytboev 2', 3', 48', 54', 58', 59'; Salimjonov 3', 6', 34'; Mirzakarimov 6', 11', 14', 40'; Komilov 10', 11'; Husanov 25', 38', 46'; Abboskhonov 41'	Report

Umpires:
Khalid Hussain (HKG)
Adilzhan Kudaibergen (UZB)

14 October 2025
15:00

Tajikistan	9–0	Kyrgyzstan
Safarov 5', 39'; Ghulomov 8', 23', 48'; Alizoda 34'; Imomov 53', 53'; Mavlaviev 54'	Report

Umpires:
Khalid Hussain (HKG)
Tianhe Ren (CHN)

15 October 2025
15:00

Uzbekistan	3–2	Hong Kong
Mirzakarimov 17'; Kakhramonov 37'; Khaytboev 57'	Report	Qismat 5'; Iu 32'

Umpires:
Tianhe Ren (CHN)
Adilzhan Kudaibergen (KAZ)

16 October 2025
10:30

Kyrgyzstan	0–40	Kazakhstan
	Report	Duisengazy 2', 6', 7', 11', 21', 22', 24', 27'; Duisengazy (continued.) 29', 35', 37', 54'; Yelubayev 3', 17', 22', 35', 39', 57'; Aitkaliyev 4', 5', 15', 31', 35'; Aslanuly 4'; Dyussebekov 5', 10', 20', 36'; Zhanat 14', 33'; Yestemessov 18', 38'; Orazkhan 19'; Yerali 21', 24', 28', 31'; Duissengazy 24', 25'; Ashargin 26'

Umpires:
Yiu Ho King (HKG)
Isroil Kuryazov (UZB)

16 October 2025
15:00

Hong Kong	15–0	Tajikistan
Ho 4', 9', 10', 39'; Iu 5', 8', 49'; Chan 15', 18'; Chuen 13'; Chan 14'; Au 16'; Dhillon 18', 22'; Tsang 57'	Report

Umpires:
Abdulaziz Abdulkhakimov (UZB)
Elyor Kholmirzaev (UZB)

17 October 2025
12:45

Kazakhstan	5–4	Uzbekistan
Duisengazy 1', 45', 45+'; Aitkaliyev 36'; Yerali 52'	Report	Salimjonov 11', 32'; Abboskhonov 19'; Mamajonov 35'

Umpires:
Tianhe Ren (CHN)
Khalid Hussain (HKG)
