= Afghanistan men's national field hockey team =

Afghanistan
- Association: Afghanistan Hockey Federation
- Confederation: AHF (Asia)
Home	Away

FIH ranking
- Current: 57 ▼1 (19 December 2025)
- Highest: 56 (present)
- Lowest: 91 (January 2019)

First international
- Afghanistan 6–6 Denmark (Berlin, Germany; August 1936)

Biggest win
- Afghanistan 5–1 United States (Melbourne, Australia; November 1956)

Biggest defeat
- Bangladesh 25–0 Afghanistan (Muscat, Oman; 13 March 2018)

Olympic Games
- Appearances: 3 (first in 1936)
- Best result: 6th (1936)

The Afghanistan men's national field hockey team represents Afghanistan in men's international field hockey competitions and is controlled by the Afghanistan Hockey Federation, the governing body for field hockey in Afghanistan.

Afghanistan has participated three times at the Summer Olympics where their best finish was in 1936 when they finished sixth.

== Tournament record ==
=== Summer Olympics ===
- 1936 – 6th place
- 1948 – 8th place
- 1956 – 11th place

=== Friendship Games ===
- 1984 – 7th place

=== Central Asia Cup ===
- 2019 – Withdrew

=== FIH Hockey Series ===
- 2018–19 – First round

=== Western Asiatic Games ===
- 1934 – (silver)
