= 2024 AHF Men's Central Asia Cup =

Tournament details
- Host country: Uzbekistan
- City: Andijan
- Dates: 26 February – 2 March
- Teams: 4 (from 1 confederation)
- Venue: Khalklar Dustligi Stadium Andijan

Final positions
- Champions: Uzbekistan (1st title)
- Runner-up: Tajikistan
- Third place: Kazakhstan

Tournament statistics
- Matches played: 8
- Goals scored: 63 (7.88 per match)
- Top scorer: (Uzbekistan) Karimov Ruslan (6 goals)

The 2024 AHF Men's Central Asia Cup was the second edition of the AHF Men's Central Asia Cup, the international men's field hockey championship of Central Asia. It was held in Andijan, Uzbekistan from 26 February to 2 March 2025.

== Teams ==
The following four teams, participated in the tournament.

- Kazakhstan
- Kyrgyzstan
- Tajikistan
- Uzbekistan

== Results ==
All times are local (UTC+5).

=== Standings ===
Pos	Team	Pld	W	D	L	GF	GA	GD	Pts
1	Uzbekistan (H)	3	3	0	0	32	1	+31	9
2	Tajikistan	3	2	0	1	7	11	−4	6
3	Kazakhstan	3	1	0	2	9	10	−1	3
4	Kyrgyzstan	3	0	0	3	0	26	−26	0

Source: FIH
Rules for classification: 1) points; 2) matches won; 3) goal difference; 4) goals for; 5) head-to-head result; 6) field goals scored.
(H) Hosts

26 February 2024
10:30

Kazakhstan	0–2	Tajikistan
	Report	Namozov 24'; Safarov 55'

Umpires:
Elyor Kholmirzaev (UZB)
Abdulaziz Abdulkhakimov (UZB)

26 February 2024
14:30

Uzbekistan	13–0	Kyrgyzstan
Khamitov 10'; Ruslan 13', 29'; Sotlikov 17', 44'; Madaminov 23', 39'; Khudoynazarov 25', 42', 59'; Satlikov 28'; Nazarov 36'; Abboskhonov 45'	Report

Umpires:
Assel Mukasheva (KAZ)
Daulet Urmanov (KAZ)

27 February 2024
14:30

Tajikistan	5–0	Kyrgyzstan
Namozov 12', 14'; Ghulomov 18'; Bakhvadinov 56'; Safarov 60'	Report

Umpires:
Deepa (IND)
Nurzhan Mukhamadiyev (KAZ)

27 February 2024
16:30

Uzbekistan	8–1	Kazakhstan
Egamberdiev 4'; Satlikov 9'; Sotlikov 15'; Nazarov 19', 31'; Ruslan 22', 49'; Khudoynazarov 53'	Report	Zhalel 28'

Umpires:
Khalid Hussain (HKG)
Hussain Al Hasani (OMA)

29 February 2024
13:30

Kazakhstan	8–0	Kyrgyzstan
Zhanat 3', 7', 22'; Akimbek 13'; Omarkhanov 18'; Aslanuly 24'; Ashargin 52'; Orazkhan 59'	Report

Umpires:
Elyor Kholmirzaev (UZB)
Zilola Muminova (UZB)

29 February 2024
15:30

Tajikistan	0–11	Uzbekistan
	Report	Satlikov 5', 34'; Oblokulov 11', 36'; Sotlikov 20', 28'; Nazarov 38'; Madaminov 38', 45'; Nazirov 60'; Khudoynazarov 60'

Umpires:
Hussain Al Hasani (OMA)
Daulet Urmanov (KAZ)

== 3/4th place match ==
2 March 2024
09:30

Kazakhstan	8–0	Kyrgyzstan
Kairatuly 6', 27'; Akimbek 15'; Tursyngali 29'; Duissengazy 41'; Zhanat 48'; Orazkhan 52'; Bakdauletov 57'	Report

Umpires:
Hussain Khalid (HKG)
Elyor Kholmirzaev (UZB)

== Final match ==
2 March 2024
13:30

Uzbekistan	7–0	Tajikistan
Oblokulov 2', 5'; Nazarov 6'; Ruslan 31', 40'; Satlikov 33'; Madaminov 60'	Report

Umpires:
Assel Mukasheva (KAZ)
Daulet Urmanov (KAZ)
