= Kazakhstan Hockey Federation =

Organization governing field hockey in Kazakhstan

- Sport: Field hockey
- Jurisdiction: Kazakhstan
- Affiliation: FIH
- Regional affiliation: AHF
- President: Serik Abikenovich Umbetov
- Secretary: Serik Kalimbaev
- Men's coach: Olga Urmanova
- Women's coach: Nurzhan Beibitov
- (Kazakhstan)

The Kazakhstan Hockey Federation (Kazakh: Qazaqstan Hokeı Federasıasy, Russian: Казахстанская федерация хоккея) is the governing body of field hockey in Kazakhstan. It is affiliated to IHF International Hockey Federation and AHF Asian Hockey Federation. The headquarters of the federation are in Almaty.

Serik Abikenovich Umbetov is the President of the Kazakhstan Hockey Federation and Serik Kalimbaev is the General Secretary.

== See also ==
- Kazakhstan men's national field hockey team
- Kazakhstan women's national field hockey team
