= 2019 AHF Men's Central Asia Cup =

Tournament details
- Host country: Kazakhstan
- City: Taldykorgan
- Dates: 2–8 September
- Teams: 4 (from 1 confederation)

Final positions
- Champions: Kazakhstan (1st title)
- Runner-up: Oman
- Third place: Uzbekistan

Tournament statistics
- Matches played: 6
- Goals scored: 31 (5.17 per match)
- Top scorer: (Kazakhstan) Yermek Tashkeyev (4 goals)

The 2019 AHF Men's Central Asia Cup was the first edition of the AHF Men's Central Asia Cup, the international men's field hockey championship of Central Asia. It was held in Taldykorgan, Kazakhstan from 2 to 8 September 2019.

== Teams ==
The following four teams, shown with pre-tournament FIH World Rankings, participated in the tournament. Afghanistan withdrew before the tournament.

- ~~Afghanistan~~ (90)
- Kazakhstan (79)
- Oman (39)
- Tajikistan (–)
- Uzbekistan (42)

== Results ==
All times are local (UTC+6).

=== Standings ===
Pos	Team	Pld	W	D	L	GF	GA	GD	Pts
1	Kazakhstan (C, H)	3	3	0	0	13	2	+11	9
2	Oman	3	1	1	1	14	4	+10	4
3	Uzbekistan	3	1	1	1	4	2	+2	4
4	Tajikistan	3	0	0	3	0	23	−23	0

Source: FIH
Rules for classification: 1) points; 2) matches won; 3) goal difference; 4) goals for; 5) head-to-head result; 6) field goals scored.
(C) Champions; (H) Hosts

=== Fixtures ===
2 September 2019
19:00

Kazakhstan	9–0	Tajikistan
Tazhenov 10'; Dyussebekov 23'; Tashkeyev 34', 36', 41', 45'; Yelubayev 34'; Uzbek 42'; Yeshpanov 52'	Report

Umpires:
Khalid Hussain (HGK)
Yaser Khurshid (PAK)

4 September 2019
17:00

Uzbekistan	3–0	Tajikistan
Satlikov 31', 39'; Madaminov 36'	Report

Umpires:
Makhsudbek Urmanov (KAZ)
Hussain Al Hasani (OMA)

5 September 2019
17:00

Kazakhstan	3–2	Oman
Tazhenov 30'; Sansyzbayev 50'; Aliyev 60'	Report	Al Fazari 39'; Al 'Amri 49'

Umpires:
Khalid Hussain (HGK)
Yaser Khurshid (PAK)

7 September 2019
15:00

Uzbekistan	1–1	Oman
Satlikov 20'	Report	Al Lawati 1'

Umpires:
Khalid Hussain (HGK)
Yaser Khurshid (PAK)

8 September 2019
15:00

Oman	11–0	Tajikistan
Al Fazari 18', 22'; Al Lawati 32'; Shamaiaa Bait 37', 45'; Al Wahaibi 39', 41', 44'; Bait 40'; Al 'Amri 48'; Al-Maaini 59'	Report

Umpires:
Elyor Kholmirzaev (UZB)
Nurzhan Beibitov (KAZ)

8 September 2019
17:00

Kazakhstan	1–0	Uzbekistan
Almen 46'	Report

Umpires:
Khalid Hussain (HGK)
Yaser Khurshid (PAK)
