= Field hockey at the 2026 Asian Games – Men's Qualifier =

2026 Men's Asian Games Qualifier
Tournament details
- Host country: Thailand
- City: Bangkok
- Dates: 2–10 April
- Teams: 9 (from 1 confederation)

Final positions
- Champions: Oman
- Runner-up: Sri Lanka
- Third place: Uzbekistan

Tournament statistics
- Matches played: 24
- Goals scored: 122 (5.08 per match)
- Top scorer(s): (Indonesia) Aulia Al Ardh (Bangladesh) As. Islam (7 goals)
- Best player: (Oman) Rashad Al Fazari
- Best young player: (Uzbekistan) Fozilbek Husanov
- Best goalkeeper: (Sri Lanka) Tharindu Hendeniya

The 2026 Men's Asian Games Qualifier was the qualification tournament for the men's field hockey event at the 2026 Asian Games. It was held from 2 April to 10 April 2026 in Bangkok, Thailand. The top six teams qualified for the 2026 Asian Games.

== Teams ==
- Bangladesh
- Chinese Taipei
- Hong Kong
- Indonesia
- Kazakhstan
- Oman
- Sri Lanka
- Thailand
- Uzbekistan

== Preliminary round ==
=== Pool A ===
| Pos | Team | Pld | W | D | L | GF | GA | GD | Pts | Qualification |
|---|---|---|---|---|---|---|---|---|---|---|
| 1 | Oman | 4 | 4 | 0 | 0 | 13 | 4 | +9 | 12 | Semi-finals |
| 2 | Indonesia | 4 | 3 | 0 | 1 | 10 | 10 | 0 | 9 | Semi-finals |
| 3 | Thailand (H) | 4 | 1 | 1 | 2 | 7 | 6 | +1 | 4 | |
| 4 | Hong Kong | 4 | 1 | 0 | 3 | 9 | 13 | −4 | 3 | |
| 5 | Kazakhstan | 4 | 0 | 1 | 3 | 9 | 15 | −6 | 1 | |

Source: FIH
Rules for classification: 1) points; 2) matches won; 3) goal difference; 4) goals for; 5) head-to-head result; 6) field goals for.
(H) Hosts

All times are in (UTC+7)

2 April 2026
14:00

| Hong Kong | 3–4 | Indonesia |
|---|---|---|
| Cheung 5'; Au 7'; Ali 25' | Report | Al Ardh 11', 40'; Akmal 26'; Muhamad 28' |

Umpires:
Mohammad Shahbaz Ali (BAN)
Abdulaziz Abdulkhakimov (UZB)

2 April 2026
16:00

| Thailand | 2–2 | Kazakhstan |
|---|---|---|
| Chueamkaew 3'; Juntakian 39' | Report | Tashkeyev 9', 44' |

Umpires:
Thipak Kanabathu (MAS)
Ishara Kulathunka (SRI)

3 April 2026
14:00

| Oman | 4–1 | Indonesia |
|---|---|---|
| Al-Maaini 28'; Al-Noufali 30'; Madit 57'; Barazahan 58' | Report | Al Ardh 13' |

Umpires:
Rawi Anbananthan (MAS)
Ishara Kulathunka (SRI)

3 April 2026
16:00

| Hong Kong | 4–3 | Kazakhstan |
|---|---|---|
| Iu 9'; Ahmed 11', 58'; Haider-Qismat 27' | Report | Dyussebekov 19'; Duisengazy 37'; Tashkeyev 40' |

Umpires:
Thipak Kanabathu (MAS)
Joven Teoh (SGP)

4 April 2026
16:00

| Thailand | 1–2 | Oman |
|---|---|---|
| Juntakian 25' | Report | Al-Maaini 13'; Al Fazari 30' |

Umpires:
Mohammad Shahbaz Ali (BAN)
Abdulaziz Abdulkhakimov (UZB)

5 April 2026
16:00

| Kazakhstan | 3–4 | Indonesia |
|---|---|---|
| Dyussebekov 44'; Duisengazy 50', 56' | Report | Asasi 6', 15'; Prastyo 31'; Akmal 47' |

Umpires:
Rawi Anbananthan (MAS)
Mohammad Shahbaz Ali (BAN)

6 April 2026
14:00

| Hong Kong | 1–2 | Oman |
|---|---|---|
| Iu 45' | Report | Barazahan 11'; Al-Maaini 41' |

Umpires:
Joven Teoh (SGP)
Ishara Kulathunka (SRI)

6 April 2026
16:00

| Indonesia | 1–0 | Thailand |
|---|---|---|
| Al Ardh 12' | Report |

Umpires:
Thipak Kanabathu (MAS)
Abdulaziz Abdulkhakimov (UZB)

7 April 2026
14:00

| Oman | 5–1 | Kazakhstan |
|---|---|---|
| Al-Noufali 18', 19'; Al Lawati 28', 40'; Al Balushi 30' | Report | Duisengazy 15' |

Umpires:
Mohammad Shahbaz Ali (BAN)
Ishara Weerasinghe (SRI)

7 April 2026
16:00

| Thailand | 4–1 | Hong Kong |
|---|---|---|
| Chaimanee 3', 60'; Chueamkaew 32'; Rungniyom 45' | Report | Haider-Qismat 32' |

Umpires:
Rawi Anbananthan (MAS)
Joven Teoh (SGP)

=== Pool B ===
| Pos | Team | Pld | W | D | L | GF | GA | GD | Pts | Qualification |
|---|---|---|---|---|---|---|---|---|---|---|
| 1 | Sri Lanka | 3 | 2 | 0 | 1 | 7 | 6 | +1 | 6 | Semi-finals |
| 2 | Uzbekistan | 3 | 1 | 1 | 1 | 10 | 4 | +6 | 4 | Semi-finals |
| 3 | Bangladesh | 3 | 1 | 1 | 1 | 7 | 7 | 0 | 4 | |
| 4 | Chinese Taipei | 3 | 1 | 0 | 2 | 6 | 13 | −7 | 3 | |

Source: FIH
Rules for classification: 1) points; 2) matches won; 3) goal difference; 4) goals for; 5) head-to-head result; 6) field goals for.

All times are in (UTC+7)

2 April 2026
10:00

| Bangladesh | 4–3 | Chinese Taipei |
|---|---|---|
| As. Islam 15', 22'; Am. Islam 34'; Emon 59' | Report | Li 4', 59'; Hsieh 60' |

Umpires:
Rawi Anbananthan (MAS)
Vincent Chang (HKG)

2 April 2026
12:00

| Sri Lanka | 3–1 | Uzbekistan |
|---|---|---|
| Ranasingha 7', 55'; Weerappuli 23' | Report | Khaytboev 45' |

Umpires:
Hussain Al Hasani (OMA)
Joven Teoh (SGP)

3 April 2026
10:00

| Chinese Taipei | 0–8 | Uzbekistan |
|---|---|---|
| | Report | Husanov 26', 27'; Salimjonov 35', 41', 54'; Mirzakarimov 47'; Khaytboev 47'; Khakimov 53' |

Umpires:
Hussian Al Hasani (OMA)
Pichai Kongman (THA)

3 April 2026
12:00

| Sri Lanka | 3–2 | Bangladesh |
|---|---|---|
| Bothale 6'; Weerappuli 16'; Rathnayake 49' | Report | As. Islam 13'; Am. Islam 49' |

Umpires:
Ilmu Wijaya (INA)
Thanakrit Boon-Art (THA)

6 April 2026
10:00

| Bangladesh | 1–1 | Uzbekistan |
|---|---|---|
| Am. Islam 46' | Report | Salimjonov 6' |

Umpires:
Pichai Kongman (THA)
Vincent Chang (HKG)

6 April 2026
12:00

| Chinese Taipei | 3–1 | Sri Lanka |
|---|---|---|
| Chang 27'; Wei 44'; Lu 49' | Report | Karunamunige 13' |

Umpires:
Ilmu Wijaya (INA)
Thanakrit Boon-Art (THA)

== Fifth to eighth place classification ==
=== Bracket ===
Semi-finals
9 April
Thailand | 2
Chinese Taipei | 3
9 April
Bangladesh (p.s.o.) | 4 (3)
Hong Kong | 4 (2)

Fifth place
10 April
Chinese Taipei | 2
Bangladesh | 3
Seventh place
10 April
Thailand (p.s.o.) | 2 (2)
Hong Kong | 2 (1)

=== 5–8th place semi-finals ===
9 April 2026
09:15

| Thailand | 2–3 | Chinese Taipei |
|---|---|---|
| Rungniyom 21'; Thawichat 28' | Report | Chang 35'; Hsieh 46', 59' |

Umpires:
Mohammad Shahbaz Ali (BAN)
Ilmu Wijaya (INA)

9 April 2026
11:30

| Bangladesh | 4–4 | Hong Kong |
|---|---|---|
| Hasan 3'; Am. Islam 5'; As. Islam 41', 47' | Report | Au 5'; Ahmed 31'; Kuldeep 46'; Iu 48' |
Penalties
| Hasan (penalty shoot-out missed); Joy (penalty shoot-out scored); Roman (penalty shoot-out scored); Uddin (penalty shoot-out missed); F. Rabby (penalty shoot-out scored) | 3–2 | (penalty shoot-out scored) Kuldeep; (penalty shoot-out missed) Ahmed; (penalty shoot-out missed) Ali; (penalty shoot-out missed) Udhampreet; (penalty shoot-out scored) Iu |

Umpires:
Hussain Al Hasani (OMA)
Abdulaziz Abdulkhakimov (UZB)

=== Seventh place game ===
10 April 2026
09:15

| Thailand | 2–2 | Hong Kong |
|---|---|---|
| Khammi 1', 4' | Report | Haider-Qismat 6', 33' |
Penalties
| Juntakian (penalty shoot-out missed); Chaimanee (penalty shoot-out scored); Khammi (penalty shoot-out missed); Deesa (penalty shoot-out scored) | 2–1 | (penalty shoot-out scored) Chuen; (penalty shoot-out missed) Kuldeep; (penalty shoot-out missed) Udhampreet; (penalty shoot-out missed) Jasminder; (penalty shoot-out missed) Iu |

Umpires:
Ishara Weerasinghe (SRI)
Ilmu Wijaya (INA)

=== Fifth place game ===
10 April 2026
11:30

| Chinese Taipei | 2–3 | Bangladesh |
|---|---|---|
| Wei 11'; Lo 34' | Report | As. Islam 7', 17'; Samin 38' |

Umpires:
Vincent Chang (HKG)
Joven Teoh (SGP)

== First to fourth place classification ==
=== Bracket ===
Semi-finals
9 April
Oman (p.s.o.) | 4 (5)
Uzbekistan | 4 (4)
9 April
Sri Lanka | 3
Indonesia | 2

Final
10 April
Oman | 3
Sri Lanka | 1
Third place
10 April
Uzbekistan | 3
Indonesia | 2

=== Semi-finals ===
9 April 2026
13:45

| Oman | 4–4 | Uzbekistan |
|---|---|---|
| Al Lawati 15'; Madit 20'; Mo. Al-Noufali 40'; Al Balushi 58' | Report | Khakimov 24', 37'; Sotlikov 26'; Komilov 29' |
Penalties
| Madit (penalty shoot-out scored); Al Fazari (penalty shoot-out missed); Al-Noufali (penalty shoot-out missed); Al. Al-Noufali (penalty shoot-out scored); Mo. Al-Noufali (penalty shoot-out scored); Al Fazari (penalty shoot-out scored); Madit (penalty shoot-out scored) | 5–4 | (penalty shoot-out missed) Sotlikov; (penalty shoot-out scored) Husanov; (penalty shoot-out scored) Khaytboev; (penalty shoot-out scored) Salimjonov; (penalty shoot-out missed) Mirzakarimov; (penalty shoot-out scored) Khaytboev; (penalty shoot-out missed) Husanov |

Umpires:
Vincent Chang (HKG)
Pichai Kongman (THA)

9 April 2026
16:00

| Sri Lanka | 3–2 | Indonesia |
|---|---|---|
| Fernando 6'; Rathnayake 48'; Kulathunga 52' | Report | Al Akbar 36'; Al Ardh 52' |

Umpires:
Rawi Anbananthan (MAS)
Thipak Kanabathu (MAS)

=== Third place game ===
10 April 2026
13:45

| Uzbekistan | 3–2 | Indonesia |
|---|---|---|
| Khaytboev 3'; Husanov 12'; Ortikboev 54' | Report | Al Ardh 24', 45' |

Umpires:
Rawi Anbananthan (MAS)
Hussain Al Hasani (OMA)

=== Final ===
10 April 2026
16:00

| Oman | 3–1 | Sri Lanka |
|---|---|---|
| Al Wahaibi 7'; Al-Noufali 29', 30' | Report | Weerappuli 21' |

Umpires:
Mohammad Shahbaz Ali (BAN)
Thipak Kanabathu (MAS)

== Statistics ==
=== Final standings ===
| Pos | Team | Qualification |
|---|---|---|
| 1 | Oman | 2026 Asian Games |
| 2 | Sri Lanka | 2026 Asian Games |
| 3 | Uzbekistan | 2026 Asian Games |
| 4 | Indonesia | 2026 Asian Games |
| 5 | Bangladesh | 2026 Asian Games |
| 6 | Chinese Taipei | |
| 7 | Thailand (H) | 2026 Asian Games |
| 8 | Hong Kong | |
| 9 | Kazakhstan | |

Source: FIH
(H) Host

=== Goalscorers ===
There were 122 goals scored in 24 matches, for an average of 5.08 goals per match.

7 goals

- (Indonesia) Aulia Al Ardh
- (Bangladesh) Ashraful Islam

5 goals

- (Oman) Aliyas Al-Noufali

4 goals

- (Kazakhstan) Agymtay Duisengazy
- (Hong Kong) Haider-Qismat
- (Bangladesh) Amirul Islam
- (Uzbekistan) Shokhrukhbek Salimjonov

3 goals

- (Hong Kong) Ishtiaq Ahmed
- (Oman) Fahad Al Lawati
- (Oman) Aseel Al-Maaini
- (Chinese Taipei) Tsung-Yu Hsieh
- (Uzbekistan) Fozilbek Husanov
- (Hong Kong) Felix Chi Him Iu
- (Uzbekistan) Khakimboy Khakimov
- (Uzbekistan) Gaybullo Khaytboev
- (Kazakhstan) Yermek Tashkeyev
- (Sri Lanka) Kusal Weerappuli

2 goals

- (Indonesia) Khaerulloh Akmal
- (Oman) Hazaa Al Balushi
- (Indonesia) Ahdan Asasi
- (Hong Kong) Pak Ko Parco Au
- (Oman) Asama Barazahan
- (Thailand) Pichet Chaimanee
- (Chinese Taipei) Chun-Yu Chang
- (Thailand) Kritsada Chueamkaew
- (Kazakhstan) Yerkebulan Dyussebekov
- (Thailand) Tanakit Juntakian
- (Thailand) Konlawat Khammi
- (Chinese Taipei) Chi-Hsuan Li
- (Oman) Aiman Madit
- (Sri Lanka) Dammika Ranasingha
- (Sri Lanka) Suresh Rathnayake
- (Thailand) Chanachol Rungniyom
- (Chinese Taipei) Cheng-Ze Wei

1 goal

- (Indonesia) Abdullah Al Akbar
- (Oman) Rashad Al Fazari
- (Oman) Maitham Al Wahaibi
- (Oman) Mohammed Al-Noufali
- (Hong Kong) Farman Ali
- (Sri Lanka) Seran Bothale
- (Hong Kong) Yan Kwan Cheung
- (Bangladesh) Md. Deen Emon
- (Sri Lanka) Udayashan Fernando
- (Bangladesh) Rakibul Islam
- (Sri Lanka) Demian Karunamunige
- (Uzbekistan) Jamshidbek Komilov
- (Sri Lanka) Rajitha Kulathunga
- (Hong Kong) Kuldeep Singh
- (Chinese Taipei) Hao-Kai Lo
- (Chinese Taipei) Sung-Ting Lu
- (Uzbekistan) Shavkatbek Mirzakarimov
- (Indonesia) Fadli Muhamad
- (Uzbekistan) Mironshokh Ortikboev
- (Indonesia) Alfandy Prastyo
- (Bangladesh) Mehrab Hasan Samin
- (Uzbekistan) Doston Sotlikov
- (Thailand) Kraiwich Thawichat

Source: FIH

== See also ==
- Field hockey at the 2026 Asian Games – Women's Qualifier
