= Oman men's national field hockey team =

Oman
- Association: Oman Hockey Association
- Confederation: AHF (Asia)
- Head Coach: Mohammed Bait Jandal
- Captain: Khalid Al-Shaaibi
Home	Away

FIH ranking
- Current: 31 ▼6 (4 October 2026)
- Highest: 22 (2014)
- Lowest: 60 (2004, 2005)

Asian Games
- Appearances: 9 (first in 1982)
- Best result: 7th (1982, 2010, 2014, 2018, 2022)

Asia Cup
- Appearances: 3 (first in 2013)
- Best result: 6th (2013)
Medal record
AHF Central Asia Cup
Silver medal – second place	2019 Taldykorgan

The Oman men's national field hockey team represents Oman in men's international field hockey competitions.

== Tournament record ==
The Oman field hockey team has never qualified for the Hockey World Cup or the Summer Olympics. In the continental cups, they have reached the seventh place at the Asian Games four times and placed sixth once at the Asia Cup.

=== Asian Games ===
Asian Games record
Year	Host	Position	Squad	Matches	Goals
1958 to 1978		did not participate			
1982	New Delhi, India	7th	—N/a	0-0-0	0-0
1986	Seoul, South Korea	8th	—N/a	0-0-5	6-30
1990	Beijing, China	did not participate			
1994	Hiroshima, Japan	9th	—N/a	0-0-4	1-25
1998 to 2002		did not participate			
2006	Doha, Qatar	10th	Squad	0-0-5	4-34
2010	Guangzhou, China	7th	Squad	2-0-4	11-46
2014	Incheon, South Korea	7th	Squad	2-0-3	6-23
2018	Jakarta, Indonesia	7th	Squad	3-0-3	12-21
2022	Hangzhou, China	7th	—N/a	3-0-3	18-38
2026	Aichi and Nagoya, Japan	11th	Squad	0-1-5	7-23
2030	Doha, Qatar	to be determined			
2034	Riyadh, Saudi Arabia	to be determined			
Highest finish (7th)		9/18		10-1-32	65-240

- 1982: No Complete Data

=== Asia Cup ===
Asia Cup record
Year	Host	Position	Pld	W	D *	L	GF	GA
1982 to 2009		did not participate						
2013	Ipoh, Malaysia	6th	5	1	1	3	7	25
2017	Dhaka, Bangladesh	8th	5	0	0	5	9	24
2022	Jakarta, Indonesia	7th	5	1	0	4	6	19
2025	Rajgir, India	withdrew						
Total	6th place	3/12	15	2	1	12	22	68

=== AHF Cup ===
AHF Cup record
Year	Host	Position
1997	Hong Kong	2nd
2002	Hong Kong	6th
2008	Singapore	2nd
2012	Bangkok, Thailand	2nd
2016	Hong Kong	did not participate
2022	Jakarta, Indonesia	2nd
2025	Jakarta, Indonesia	1st
Highest finish		1st place

=== Asian Champions Trophy ===
Asian Champions Trophy record
Year	Result	Pld	W	D*	L	GF	GA
(China) 2011	Did not participate						
(Qatar) 2012	5th	6	1	0	5	8	37
(Japan) 2013	6th	6	0	0	6	4	32
(Malaysia) 2016	Did not participate						
(Oman) 2018	6th	6	0	0	6	5	34
(Bangladesh) 2021	Did not participate						
Total	Best: 5th	18	1	0	17	17	102

=== AHF Central Asia Cup ===
AHF Central Asia Cup
Year	Result	Pld	W	D*	L	GF	GA
(Kazakhstan) 2019	2nd	3	1	1	1	14	4
Total	Best: 2nd	3	1	1	1	14	4

=== West Asian Cup ===
Year	Rank	Pld	W	D	L
(Qatar) 2014	1st	3	1	2	0
Total	1/1	3	1	2	0

=== Hockey World League ===
Hockey World League record
Season	Position	Round	Pld	W	D *	L	GF	GA
2012–13	29th	Round 1	3	1	0	2	8	10
2012–13	29th	Round 2	5	1	0	4	11	27
2014–15	23rd	Round 1	3	2	0	1	10	2
2014–15	23rd	Round 2	6	2	1	3	9	24
2016–17	23rd	Round 1	3	2	0	1	10	11
2016–17	23rd	Round 2	6	3	0	3	17	21
Total	Best: 23rd	Round 2	26	11	1	14	65	92

*Draws include matches decided on a penalty shoot-out.

== Current squad ==
The following is the Oman roster in the men's field hockey tournament of the 2026 Asian Games.

Head coach: (Oman) Mohammed Bait Jandal

1. Aliyas Al-Noufali
2. Asama Barazahan
3. Shamaiaa Akram Bait
5. Usama Bait
6. Khalid Al-Shaaibi (C)
10. Aiman Madit
11. Mohammed Al-Noufali
13. Alkhoder Al-Noufali
14. Sanad Sbeit
15. Fisal Alloun
16. Maitham Al-Wahaibi
17. Aseel Al-Maaini
19. Khalid Al-Hasni
20. Fahad Al-Lawati
22. Ahmed Al-Naabi (GK)
23. Rashad Al-Fazari (C)
25. Rashid Al-Alawi
26. Ibrahim Al-Farsi (GK)
28. Said Al-Fazari
30. Al Baraa Al-Nofli

== Results & Fixtures ==
=== 2026 ===
==== 2026 Asian Games Qualifier ====
3 April 2026 Pool A	Oman	4–1	Indonesia	Bangkok, Thailand
14:00	Al-Maaini 28'; Al-Noufali 30'; Madit 57'; Barazahan 58'	Report	Al Ardh 13'	Stadium: Royal Thai Air Force Hockey Stadium

4 April 2026 Pool A	Thailand	1–2	Oman	Bangkok, Thailand
16:00	Juntakian 25'	Report	Al-Maaini 13'; Al Fazari 30'	Stadium: Royal Thai Air Force Hockey Stadium

6 April 2026 Pool A	Hong Kong	1–2	Oman	Bangkok, Thailand
14:00	Iu 45'	Report	Barazahan 11'; Al-Maaini 41'	Stadium: Royal Thai Air Force Hockey Stadium

7 April 2026 Pool A	Oman	5–1	Kazakhstan	Bangkok, Thailand
14:00	Al-Noufali 18', 19'; Al Lawati 28', 40'; Al Balushi 30'	Report	Duisengazy 15'	Stadium: Royal Thai Air Force Hockey Stadium

9 April 2026 SF	Oman	4–4 (5–4 p)	Uzbekistan	Bangkok, Thailand
13:45	Al Lawati 15'; Madit 20'; Mo. Al-Noufali 40'; Al Balushi 58'	Report	Khakimov 24', 37'; Sotlikov 26'; Komilov 29'	Stadium: Royal Thai Air Force Hockey Stadium
	Penalties
	Madit (penalty shoot-out scored); Al Fazari (penalty shoot-out missed); Al-Noufali (penalty shoot-out missed); Al. Al-Noufali (penalty shoot-out scored); Mo. Al-Noufali (penalty shoot-out scored); Al Fazari (penalty shoot-out scored); Madit (penalty shoot-out scored)		(penalty shoot-out missed) Sotlikov; (penalty shoot-out scored) Husanov; (penalty shoot-out scored) Khaytboev; (penalty shoot-out scored) Salimjonov; (penalty shoot-out missed) Mirzakarimov; (penalty shoot-out scored) Khaytboev; (penalty shoot-out missed) Husanov

10 April 2026 Final	Oman	3–1	Sri Lanka	Bangkok, Thailand
16:00	Al Wahaibi 7'; Al-Noufali 29', 30'	Report	Weerappuli 21'	Stadium: Royal Thai Air Force Hockey Stadium

==== Test Series ====
29 July 2026 Match 1	Oman	0–3	Pakistan U20	Oman

31 July 2026 Match 2	Oman	1–3	Pakistan U20	Oman

1 August 2026 Match 3	Oman	2–4	Pakistan U20	Oman

2 August 2026 Match 4	Oman	2–2	Pakistan U20	Oman

4 August 2026 Match 5	Oman	3–3	Pakistan U20	Oman

==== Asian Games ====
18 September 2026 Pool B	China	2–0	Oman	Kakamigahara, Japan
09:00	Gao 23'; Du 35'	Report		Stadium: Gifu Prefectural Green Stadium

22 September 2026 Pool B	Malaysia	7–0	Oman	Kakamigahara, Japan
15:00	Saari 3', 43'; Rozemi 17'; Azrai 24', 57'; Silverius 30'; Anuar 57'	Report		Stadium: Gifu Prefectural Green Stadium

24 September 2026 Pool B	Oman	2–3	Uzbekistan	Kakamigahara, Japan
13:00	Al-Hasni 38'; Al-Fazari 45+'	Report	Husanov 36', 53'; Khakimov 54'	Stadium: Gifu Prefectural Green Stadium

26 September 2026 Pool B	Oman	0–1	Thailand	Kakamigahara, Japan
09:00		Report	Juntakian 57'	Stadium: Gifu Prefectural Green Stadium

28 September 2026 Pool B	Pakistan	7–2	Oman	Kakamigahara, Japan
15:00	Khan 22', 28'; Rana 34', 44', 59'; Ali 40'; Ammad 46'	Report	Al-Nofli 28'; Madit 36'	Stadium: Gifu Prefectural Green Stadium

1 October 2026 11th place match	Indonesia	3–3 (2–3 p)	Oman	Kakamigahara, Japan
09:00	Alam 11'; Muhamad 45+'; Al Ardh 56'	Report	Barazahan 24'; M. Al-Noufali 29'; Madit 50'	Stadium: Gifu Prefectural Green Stadium
	Penalties
	Guntara (penalty shoot-out scored); Muhamad (penalty shoot-out missed); Asasi (penalty shoot-out missed); Fathur (penalty shoot-out scored); Firdaus (penalty shoot-out missed)		(penalty shoot-out scored) A. Al-Noufali; (penalty shoot-out missed) Al-Fazari; (penalty shoot-out scored) Al-Fazari; (penalty shoot-out missed) Al-Wahaibi; (penalty shoot-out scored) Barazahan
