= Mario Moore =

- Born: 1987 (age 38–39); Detroit, Michigan
- Education: College for Creative Studies, BFA Yale School of Art, MFA
- Occupation: Painter
- Awards: Kresge Arts Fellow; Princeton Hodder Fellowship
- Website: https://www.mariomoorestudio.com/

Mario Moore is a painter from Detroit, where he also lives and works. His work focuses on Black people and culture in America. His paintings "draw parallels" between modern and historical racial dynamics and portrays them in his art. He is known for the eye contact that the figures in his paintings seem to make with the viewer.

== Exhibitions ==
Several art studios and fairs have shown Moore's work. Collections in which is work is a permanent staple are Studio Museum in Harlem; The Detroit Institute of Arts; and the Princeton University Art Museum, NJ. The "BUTTER" Art Fair showcased him as an artist along with other Black artists.

Other exhibitions include the Smart Museum of Art, Chicago, IL; David Klein Gallery, Detroit, MI; The Urban Institute of Contemporary Arts, Grand Rapids, MI; Cranbrook Art Museum, Bloomfield Hills, MI; Jeffrey Deitch Gallery, Los Angeles, CA; Arthur Roger Gallery, New Orleans, LA; The Cleveland Museum of Art, and Colby College Museum of Art.

His specific showcases have rotated between exhibits and shows. One of his exhibitions called "Presence & Preservation" was his first west cost solo exhibition, opened at Charles H. Wright Museum, Detroit in 2021 and moved to the California African American Museum (CAAM) in 2022. Another exhibition, Revolutionary Times, was shown at both the Flint Institute of Arts and Grand Rapids Art Museum in 2024.
