= Uzbekistan men's national field hockey team =

Uzbekistan
- Association: Uzbekistan Hockey Federation
- Confederation: AHF (Asia)
- Head Coach: Enver Ismailov
- Manager: Rinat Ahmadulin
- Captain: Ruslan Satlikov
Home	Away

FIH ranking
- Current: 55 ▼9 (4 October 2026)

Asian Games
- Appearances: 2 (first in 2022)
- Best result: 10th (2022, 2026)
Medal record
AHF Men's Central Asia Cup
Gold medal – first place	2024 Andijan	Team
Silver medal – second place	2025 Tashkent	Team
Bronze medal – third place	2019 Taldykorgan	Team

The Uzbekistan men's national field hockey team represents Uzbekistan in international field hockey competitions and is controlled by the Uzbekistan Hockey Federation, the governing body for field hockey in Uzbekistan. The team is ranked 55 ▼9 (4 October 2026) in the world.

== Tournament History ==
=== Asian Games ===
Asian Games record
Year	Host	Rank	Matches	Goals
2022	China	10th	1-0-5	8-53
2026	Japan	10th	1-0-5	8-24
Highest finish		2/18	2-0-10	16-77

Asian Games (2022–2026) history
Year	Round	Score	Result
2022	Group stage	India 16–0 Uzbekistan	Loss
2022	Group stage	Uzbekistan 1–10 Japan	Loss
2022	Group stage	Uzbekistan 2–18 Pakistan	Loss
2022	Group stage	Bangladesh 4–2 Uzbekistan	Loss
2022	Group stage	Singapore 1–2 Uzbekistan	Win
2022	9th place game	Uzbekistan 1–4 Indonesia	Loss
2026	Group stage	Malaysia 7–0 Uzbekistan	Loss
2026	Group stage	Pakistan 5–1 Uzbekistan	Loss
2026	Group stage	Oman 2–3 Uzbekistan	Win
2026	Group stage	Uzbekistan 1–3 China	Loss
2026	Group stage	Uzbekistan 1–3 Thailand	Loss
2026	9th place match	Sri Lanka 4–2 Uzbekistan	Loss

=== AHF Cup ===
AHF Cup record
Year	Host	Rank	Matches	Goals
1997	Hong Kong	5th	2-2-2	11-14
2002	Hong Kong	Did Not Compete		
2008	Singapore	6th	0-0-0	0-0
2012	Thailand	5th	3-0-2	16-8
2016	Hong Kong	5th	1-2-2	13-16
2022	Indonesia	8th	1-1-3	5-15
2025	Indonesia	6th	2-1-3	17-20
Highest finish		6/7	9-6-12	62-73

- 2008 Results Unknown

=== AHF Central Asia Cup ===
Central Asia Cup
Year	Host	Rank	Matches	Goals
2019	(Kazakhstan) Taldykorgan	3rd place, bronze medalist(s)	1-1-1	4-2
2024	(Uzbekistan) Andijan	1st place, gold medalist(s)	4-0-0	39-1
2025	(Uzbekistan) Tashkent	2nd place, silver medalist(s)	4-0-1	61-7
Highest finish		3/3	9-1-2	104-10

=== Indoor Hockey Asia Cup ===
Indoor Hockey Asia Cup
Year	Rank	Matches	Goals
2008	3rd	-	-
2009	3rd	-	-
2010	3rd		
2012	2nd		
2015	3rd	3-0-2	42-31
2017	4th	1-2-2	17-23
2019	4th	3-0-3	27-24
Total	7/10	7-2-7	86-78

== Current squad ==
The following is the Uzbekistan roster in the men's field hockey tournament of the 2026 Asian Games.

Head Coach:

1. Davlat Tolibbaev (GK)
4. Islombek Mamajonov
5. Azizbek Ibrokhimov
7. Shavkatbek Mirzakarimov
9. Shokhrukhbek Salimjonov
10. Mukhammadkarim Aslanov
11. Ruzimukhammad Nazirov
12. Gaybullo Khaytboev (C)
14. Khakimboy Khakimov
15. Azamatkhon Abboskhonov
18. Fozilbek Husanov
19. Jamshidbek Komilov
20. Nodirbek Yuldashev
21. Gayratbek Ganiev (GK)
22. Bakhodirjon Abdurakhmonov
44. Asadbek Asliddinov
77. Fakhriddin Saydullaev
99. Doston Sotlikov

== Results & Fixtures ==
=== 2026 ===
==== 2026 Asian Games Qualifier ====
2 April 2026 Pool B	Sri Lanka	3–1	Uzbekistan	Bangkok, Thailand
12:00	Ranasingha 7', 55'; Weerappuli 23'	Report	Khaytboev 45'	Stadium: Royal Thai Air Force Hockey Stadium

3 April 2026 Pool B	Chinese Taipei	0–8	Uzbekistan	Bangkok, Thailand
10:00		Report	Husanov 26', 27'; Salimjonov 35', 41', 54'; Mirzakarimov 47'; Khaytboev 47'; Khakimov 53'	Stadium: Royal Thai Air Force Hockey Stadium

6 April 2026 Pool B	Bangladesh	1–1	Uzbekistan	Bangkok, Thailand
10:00	Am. Islam 46'	Report	Salimjonov 6'	Stadium: Royal Thai Air Force Hockey Stadium

9 April 2026 SF	Oman	4–4 (5–4 p)	Uzbekistan	Bangkok, Thailand
13:45	Al Lawati 15'; Madit 20'; Mo. Al-Noufali 40'; Al Balushi 58'	Report	Khakimov 24', 37'; Sotlikov 26'; Komilov 29'	Stadium: Royal Thai Air Force Hockey Stadium
	Penalties
	Madit (penalty shoot-out scored); Al Fazari (penalty shoot-out missed); Al-Noufali (penalty shoot-out missed); Al. Al-Noufali (penalty shoot-out scored); Mo. Al-Noufali (penalty shoot-out scored); Al Fazari (penalty shoot-out scored); Madit (penalty shoot-out scored)		(penalty shoot-out missed) Sotlikov; (penalty shoot-out scored) Husanov; (penalty shoot-out scored) Khaytboev; (penalty shoot-out scored) Salimjonov; (penalty shoot-out missed) Mirzakarimov; (penalty shoot-out scored) Khaytboev; (penalty shoot-out missed) Husanov

10 April 2026 Bronze medal match	Uzbekistan	3–2	Indonesia	Bangkok, Thailand
13:45	Khaytboev 3'; Husanov 12'; Ortikboev 54'	Report	Al Ardh 24', 45'	Stadium: Royal Thai Air Force Hockey Stadium

==== 2026 Asian Games ====
20 September 2026 Pool B	Malaysia	7–0	Uzbekistan	Kakamigahara, Japan
13:00	Sumantri 11'; Saari 15', 24', 43'; Kamaruddin 36'; Azrai 59'; Jali 60'	Report		Stadium: Gifu Prefectural Green Stadium

22 September 2026 Pool B	Pakistan	5–1	Uzbekistan	Kakamigahara, Japan
09:00	Ammad 18'; Khan 33', 57'; Rehman 40'; Mahmood 45'	Report	Salimjonov 30+'	Stadium: Gifu Prefectural Green Stadium

24 September 2026 Pool B	Oman	2–3	Uzbekistan	Kakamigahara, Japan
13:00	Al-Hasni 38'; Al-Fazari 45+'	Report	Husanov 36', 53'; Khakimov 54'	Stadium: Gifu Prefectural Green Stadium

26 September 2026 Pool B	Uzbekistan	1–3	China	Kakamigahara, Japan
19:00	Abboskhonov 5'	Report	Zhao 10', 36'; Gao 22'	Stadium: Gifu Prefectural Green Stadium

28 September 2026 Pool B	Uzbekistan	1–3	Thailand	Kakamigahara, Japan
13:00	Komilov 43'	Report	Chueamkaew 5'; Khammi 14'; Hayeeda-Oh 15'	Stadium: Gifu Prefectural Green Stadium

3 October 2026 9th place match	Sri Lanka	4–2	Uzbekistan	Kakamigahara, Japan
09:00	Fernando 27'; Sudusinghe 27'; Bothale 49'; Rathnayake 55'	Report	Khakimov 13'; Sotlikov 33'	Stadium: Gifu Prefectural Green Stadium

== See also ==
- Uzbekistan women's national field hockey team
