= Kazakhstan men's national field hockey team =

Kazakhstan
- Association: Kazakhstan Hockey Federation
- Confederation: AHF (Asia)
- Head Coach: Olga Urmanova
- Manager: Makhmud Orman
- Captain: Yerkebulan Dyussebekov

FIH ranking
- Current: 55 ▲13 (9 March 2026)

Asian Games
- Appearances: 2 (first in 1994)
- Best result: 6th (1994)

Asia Cup
- Appearances: 2 (first in 1994)
- Best result: 5th (1994)
Medal record
AHF Central Asia Cup
Gold medal – first place	2019 Taldykorgan
Gold medal – first place	2025 Tashkent
Bronze medal – third place	2024 Andijan

The Kazakhstan men's national field hockey team represents Kazakhstan in men's international field hockey competitions and is controlled by the Kazakhstan Hockey Federation, the governing body for field hockey in Kazakhstan.

Kazakhstan participated twice in the Asian Games in 1994 and 2018 and once in the Asia Cup in 1993.

== Tournament record ==
=== Asian Games ===
Asian Games
Year	Host	Rank	Matches	Goals
1994	Japan	6th	3-0-3	17-22
2018	Indonesia	11th	0-1-5	7-47
Highest finish		2/17	3-1-8	24-69

=== Asia Cup ===
Men's Hockey Asia Cup record
Year	Host	Position	Pld	W	D	L	GF	GA
1982 to 1989		Part of the Soviet Union						
1994	Hiroshima, Japan	5th	6	3	1	2	13	11
1999 to 2022		Did not qualify						
2025	Rajgir, India	7th	5	1	0	4	8	44
Total		5th place	11	4	1	6	21	55

=== AHF Cup ===
Men's AHF Cup record
Year	Host	Rank	Matches	Goals
1997 to 2008		Did Not Compete		
2012	Thailand	9th	0-0-4	3-35
2016	Hong Kong	Did Not Compete		
2022	Indonesia	4th	1-0-4	11-18
2025	Indonesia	4th	2-1-3	8-18
Highest finish		3/7	3-1-8	22-71

=== AHF Central Asia Cup ===
- 2019 – (gold) 3W, 0L, 13-2
- 2024 – (bronze) 2W, 2L, 17-10
- 2025 – (gold) 5W, 0L, 71-7

=== Hockey World League ===
- 2016–17 – Round 1 1W 3L 8-17

=== FIH Hockey Series ===
- 2018–19 – First round 2W 1L 16-6

=== Indoor Hockey Asia Cup ===
Indoor Hockey Asia Cup
Year	Rank	Matches	Goals
2008	DNP	-	-
2009	DNP	-	-
2010	6th	0-0-5	2-46
2012	6th	1-2-4	14-41
2014	3rd	2-0-3	13-30
2015	2nd	4-0-2	51-25
2017	2nd	3-1-1	25-27
2019	2nd	5-0-1	35-18
2022	3rd	4-2-1	30-18
2024	3rd	4-1-1	32-14
Total	8/10	23-6-18	202-209

- 2012 : KAZ W-L THA B (No Data) + TPE 6-5 KAZ PP

== Results & Fixtures ==
=== 2026 ===
==== 2026 Asian Games Qualifier ====
2 April 2026 Pool A	Thailand	2–2	Kazakhstan	Bangkok, Thailand
16:00	Chueamkaew 3'; Juntakian 39'	Report	Tashkeyev 9', 44'	Stadium: Royal Thai Air Force Hockey Stadium

3 April 2026 Pool A	Hong Kong	4–3	Kazakhstan	Bangkok, Thailand
16:00	Iu 9'; Ahmed 11', 58'; Haider-Qismat 27'	Report	Dyussebekov 19'; Duisengazy 37'; Tashkeyev 40'	Stadium: Royal Thai Air Force Hockey Stadium

5 April 2026 Pool A	Kazakhstan	3–4	Indonesia	Bangkok, Thailand
16:00	Dyussebekov 44'; Duisengazy 50', 56'	Report	Asasi 6', 15'; Prastyo 31'; Akmal 47'	Stadium: Royal Thai Air Force Hockey Stadium

7 April 2026 Pool A	Oman	5–1	Kazakhstan	Bangkok, Thailand
14:00	Al-Noufali 18', 19'; Al Lawati 28', 40'; Al Balushi 30'	Report	Duisengazy 15'	Stadium: Royal Thai Air Force Hockey Stadium

== See also ==
- Kazakhstan women's national field hockey team
- Soviet Union men's national field hockey team
