= National Hockey Association of Afghanistan =

Governing body of field hockey in Afghanistan

The National Hockey Association of Afghanistan is the governing body of field hockey in Afghanistan. It is affiliated with the Fédération Internationale de Hockey (FIH) and the Asian Hockey Federation (ASHF). The headquarters of the association is in Kabul, Afghanistan.

Abdul Matin Qodosi is the president of the association. Dr. Mirwais Bahawi is the secretary.

== See also ==
- Asian Hockey Federation
