= Sri Lanka men's national field hockey team =

Sri Lanka
- Association: Sri Lanka Hockey Federation
- Confederation: AHF (Asia)
- Head Coach: Mohamed Rifas
- Manager: R. Maheshwaran
- Captain: Tharindu Hendeniya
Home	Away

FIH ranking
- Current: 38 (4 October 2026)
- Highest: 34 (2007)
- Lowest: 56 (2006)

Asian Games
- Appearances: 8 (first in 1962)
- Best result: 5th (1966, 1974)

Asia Cup
- Appearances: 4 (first in 1982)
- Best result: 7th (1982)
Medal record
South Asian Games
Bronze medal – third place	2006 Colombo	Team

The Sri Lanka men's national field hockey team represents Sri Lanka in international field hockey competitions. It is ranked as the fourth best nation in the South Asian region behind India, Pakistan, Bangladesh and ranked 38 (4 October 2026) in the world.

== History ==
Sri Lanka was once considered a contender in the 1970s but failed to perform well at the international level for about four decades. The field hockey team from Sri Lanka participated in the Hockey World League for the first time in their history when they took part in the 2016–17 Men's FIH Hockey World League Round 1 and they performed really well by defeating every team that they had played in pool matches. They also qualified for the finals of the Hockey World League Round 1 in the Asian category. In the finals Sri Lanka played a draw in full-time against China, with 3 goals from each team. China went on to win the final by scoring 4-2 in the penalty shootout and Sri Lanka secured the silver medal at the end of Round 1 competition. After emerging as runners-up the Sri Lankan team qualified to play in the 2016-17 Men's FIH Hockey World League Round 2. However, Sri Lanka did not win a single game and crashed out from the FIH Hockey World League. In Round 2, Sri Lanka secured 7th place by beating Fiji in the 7th place playoff.

In 2016, Sri Lanka made history by qualifying to play in the finals of the Asian Hockey Federation Cup for the first time. In the finals, Sri Lanka lost 0-3 to Bangladesh and secured the silver medal.

Sri Lanka also qualified to compete at the 2018 Asian Games in the men's team event after a third-place finish in the Asian Games qualification round. They placed 8th in the Asian Games hockey tournament.

== Tournament history ==
=== Asian Games ===
- 1962 – 7th
- 1966 – 5th
- 1970 – 6th
- 1974 – 5th
- 1978 – 7th
- 2014 – 10th
- 2018 – 8th
- 2022 – Withdrew
- 2026 – 9th

=== Asia Cup ===
- 1982 – 7th
- 1985 – 8th
- 1999 – 9th
- 2007 – 9th

=== AHF Cup ===
AHF Cup record
Year	Host	Position
1997	Hong Kong	3rd
2002	Hong Kong	3rd
2008	Singapore	4th
2012	Bangkok, Thailand	3rd
2016	Hong Kong	2nd
2022	Jakarta, Indonesia	3rd
2025	Jakarta, Indonesia	7th
Highest finish		2nd place

=== Hockey World League ===
- 2012–13 – Round 1
- 2014–15 – Round 1
- 2016–17 – 33rd

=== South Asian Games ===
- 1995 – 4th place
- 2006 – (bronze)
- 2010 – 4th place
- 2016 – 4th place
- 2027 – TBD

== Current squad ==
The following is the Sri Lanka roster in the men's field hockey tournament of the 2026 Asian Games.

Head coach: (Sri Lanka) Rifas Mohamed

1. Alwis Wathuthantrege
2. Daammika Ranasingha
3. Sameera Weerasuriya
4. Ross Fernando
7. Suren Bothale
9. Sandaruwan Batuvita
10. Rajitha Kulathunga (C)
11. Sanda Sudusinghe
12. Demian Karunamunige
14. Udayashan Fernando
15. Madumal Palle
17. Seran Bothale
19. Kusal Weerappuli
23. Madushan Herath
27. Maleesha Madurawalage
28. Nilaksha Visidagamage (GK)
29. Tharindu Hendeniya (GK)
30. Suresh Rathnayake

== Results and fixtures ==
The following is a list of match results in the last 12 months, as well as any future matches that have been scheduled.

Win Draw Loss Fixture

=== 2026 ===
==== 2026 Asian Games Qualifier ====
2 April 2026 Pool B	Sri Lanka	3–1	Uzbekistan	Bangkok, Thailand
12:00	Ranasingha 7', 55'; Weerappuli 23'	Report	Khaytboev 45'	Stadium: Royal Thai Air Force Hockey Stadium

3 April 2026 Pool B	Sri Lanka	3–2	Bangladesh	Bangkok, Thailand
12:00	Bothale 6'; Weerappuli 16'; Rathnayake 49'	Report	As. Islam 13'; Am. Islam 49'	Stadium: Royal Thai Air Force Hockey Stadium

6 April 2026 Pool B	Chinese Taipei	3–1	Sri Lanka	Bangkok, Thailand
12:00	Chang 27'; Wei 44'; Lu 49'	Report	Karunamunige 13'	Stadium: Royal Thai Air Force Hockey Stadium

9 April 2026 SF	Sri Lanka	3–2	Indonesia	Bangkok, Thailand
16:00	Fernando 6'; Rathnayake 48'; Kulathunga 52'	Report	Al Akbar 36'; Al Ardh 52'	Stadium: Royal Thai Air Force Hockey Stadium

10 April 2026 Final	Oman	3–1	Sri Lanka	Bangkok, Thailand
16:00	Al Wahaibi 7'; Al-Noufali 29', 30'	Report	Weerappuli 21'	Stadium: Royal Thai Air Force Hockey Stadium

==== 2026 Asian Games ====
20 September 2026 Pool A	Japan	9–0	Sri Lanka	Kakamigahara, Japan
17:00	Kimura 15'; Yamasaki 18', 29', 46', 58'; Fujishima 25'; Kawabe 48'; Tanaka 51'; Ooka 55'	Report		Stadium: Gifu Prefectural Green Stadium

22 September 2026 Pool A	India	16–1	Sri Lanka	Kakamigahara, Japan
19:00	Mandeep 5'; Jugraj 10', 22', 42', 53'; Abhishek 11', 17', 49'; Harmanpreet 16', 45'; Sukhjeet 29'; Dilpreet 30', 38', 55'; Manpreet 31'; Prasad 36'	Report	Rathnayake 50'	Stadium: Gifu Prefectural Green Stadium

24 September 2026 Pool A	Bangladesh	5–1	Sri Lanka	Kakamigahara, Japan
11:00	Am. Islam 8', 27'; As. Islam 16', 54'; Hossain 43'	Report	Weerappuli 18'	Stadium: Gifu Prefectural Green Stadium

26 September 2026 Pool A	Sri Lanka	0–5	South Korea	Kakamigahara, Japan
15:00		Report	Park 29'; Son 50'; Lim Do. 54', 58'; Yang 55'	Stadium: Gifu Prefectural Green Stadium

28 September 2026 Pool A	Sri Lanka	4–3	Indonesia	Kakamigahara, Japan
11:00	Ranasingha 11'; Batuvita 23'; Fernando 51'; Sudusinghe 58'	Report	Muhamad 20'; Prastyo 44', 50'	Stadium: Gifu Prefectural Green Stadium

3 October 2026 9th place match	Sri Lanka	4–2	Uzbekistan	Kakamigahara, Japan
09:00	Fernando 27'; Sudusinghe 27'; Bothale 49'; Rathnayake 55'	Report	Khakimov 13'; Sotlikov 33'	Stadium: Gifu Prefectural Green Stadium
