= Wang Xiaowei =

Director of the People's Republic of China

Wang Xiaowei (Chinese: 汪小为; June 1922 – February 25, 2016), a native of Guanyun, Jiangsu Province, was a director of the People's Republic of China.

In October 1940, he joined the revolutionary work, and in March 1941, he joined the Chinese Communist Party. He later served as deputy party secretary and deputy director of the Beijing Municipal Bureau of Broadcasting, and director of Beijing Television. He died on February 25, 2016, at the age of 93 in Beijing.
