= 1982 Men's Hockey Asia Cup =

Field hockey competition

Tournament details
- Host country: Pakistan
- City: Karachi
- Dates: March 12-20
- Teams: 7 (from 1 confederation)

Final positions
- Champions: Pakistan (1st title)
- Runner-up: India
- Third place: China

Tournament statistics
- Matches played: 21
- Goals scored: 130 (6.19 per match)

The 1982 Men's Hockey Asia Cup was the first edition of the Asia Cup organized by Asian Hockey Federation (AHF). It was held in Karachi, Pakistan from 12 to 20 March 1982 and saw seven teams compete with an eighth (Japan) not being able to compete.

Initially the competition was going to be held in Lahore, but due to the persistent rain, the event was moved to Karachi. Once there, the competition was contested in a round-robin format with each team competing against one another. After 21 matches were played, Pakistan took out the tournament winning all six matches to become the first champions of the Asia Cup ahead of India and China who finished with the silver and bronze respectively.

== Qualified teams ==
Eight teams qualified through to the Asian Cup with the top three from the eastern qualifying group joining the remaining five teams in competing. After qualifying, Japan withdrew from the Asia Cup.

Event	Quotas	Qualifier(s)
Host Nation	1	Pakistan
Automatic Qualification.	4	Bangladesh; India; Malaysia; Sri Lanka
Eastern Qualifying	3	China; ~~Japan~~; Singapore

== Results ==
=== Table ===
Pos	Team	Pld	W	D	L	GF	GA	GD	Pts
1	Pakistan (H)	6	6	0	0	51	1	+50	12
2	India	6	5	0	1	40	4	+36	10
3	China	6	4	0	2	7	18	−11	8
4	Malaysia	6	3	0	3	18	12	+6	6
5	Bangladesh	6	2	0	4	8	22	−14	4
6	Singapore	6	0	1	5	4	30	−26	1
7	Sri Lanka	6	0	1	5	2	43	−41	1

Source: Todor66
(H) Hosts

=== Matches ===
12 March 1982

China	2–1	Malaysia

12 March 1982

India	6–0	Bangladesh

13 March 1982

India	12–0	Singapore

14 March 1982

China	1–0	Sri Lanka

14 March 1982

Pakistan	7–0	Singapore

14 March 1982

India	2–0	Malaysia

15 March 1982

Malaysia	4–0	Singapore

16 March 1982

India	13–0	Sri Lanka

16 March 1982

Pakistan	7–0	Malaysia

17 March 1982

Singapore	2–2	Sri Lanka

17 March 1982

India	7–0	China

18 March 1982

Bangladesh	3–2	Singapore

19 March 1982

China	2–0	Singapore

19 March 1982

Pakistan	4–0	India

March 1982

Pakistan	10–1	China

March 1982

Pakistan	9–0	Bangladesh

March 1982

Pakistan	14–0	Sri Lanka

March 1982

China	1–0	Bangladesh

March 1982

Malaysia	4–1	Bangladesh

March 1982

Malaysia	9–0	Sri Lanka

March 1982

Bangladesh	4–0	Sri Lanka

== Winners ==
1982 Men's Hockey Asia Cup winners

Pakistan
First title

== Final standings ==
1. Pakistan
2. India
3. China
4. Malaysia
5. Bangladesh
6. Singapore
7. Sri Lanka
