= 2022 Hockey Champions Trophy Bangladesh =

DMCB Hockey Champions Trophy Bangladesh
Tournament details
- Dates: 28 October – 17 November 2022
- Administrator(s): BHF
- Format(s): Round-robin tournament; Playoffs
- Host(s): Bangladesh
- Venue(s): Maulana Bhasani Hockey Stadium
- Teams: 6

Final positions
- Champions: Acme Chattogram
- Runner-up: Monarch Padma
- Third Place: Rupayan City Cumilla

Tournament summary
- Matches played: 34
- Goals scored: 197 (5.79 per match)
- Player of the tournament: (India) Devindar Walmiki
- Most goals: (India) Devindar Walmiki(18)

The 2022 DMCB Hockey Champions Trophy Bangladesh (Bengali: ডিএমসিবি হকি চ্যাম্পিয়নস ট্রফি বাংলাদেশ ২০২২) is the inaugural season of the professional field hockey league Hockey Champions Trophy Bangladesh which is organized by Bangladesh Hockey Federation (BHF) and ACE. The tournament started from 28 October and ended on 17 November 2022.

== Venue ==
All matches were played at Maulana Bhasani Hockey Stadium in Dhaka, Bangladesh.

Dhaka	Dhaka is located in Bangladesh
Maulana Bhasani Hockey Stadium	Dhaka is located in Bangladesh
Capacity: 10,000	Dhaka is located in Bangladesh

== Players draft ==
The players draft took place in Dhaka on 10 October.

The World Cup playing players are —Argentina's Juan Martin Lopez (2006, 2010, 2014, 2018) and Guido Barreiros (2014), India's SV Sunil (2014, 2018), Chinglesana Singh (2014, 2018) and Jasjit Singh (2014), Malaysia's Azri Hasan (2018) and Fitri Saari (2014, 2018).

A total of 186 local players and 30 foreign players were listed before the draft, and of those, 108 local and six foreign players remained unsold.

The local players were categorised as icon, A plus, A, B and C category players, while foreign players were as icon, A, B and six in reserved category players, listed before the draft.

The listed 30-foreign players in the list are from 10 countries – seven each from India and Malaysia, three from South Korea, two each from Argentina, Germany, Pakistan, Indonesia, Oman and the Netherlands, and one from Japan.

Icon players : Milon Hossain, Rasel Mahmud Jimmy, Ashraful Islam, Khorshedur Rahman, Farhad Ahmed Shitul, Deen Islam Emon, Fazle Hossain Rabbi, Sarwar Hossain, Roman Sarkar, Nayeem Uddin, Biplob Kujur, Sohanur Rahman Sabuj, Mehdi Hasan, Arshad Hossain, Pushkor Khisha Mimo, Abu Sayeed Nippon, Rezaul Karim Babu, Prince Lal and Rakibul Hasan Rocky

== Participating teams ==
On 8 September 2022 Bangladesh Hockey Federation have announced the name of participating teams.

Team	Appearance
Acme Chattogram	Debut
Metro Express Barishal	Debut
Monarch Padma	Debut
Rupayan City Cumilla	Debut
Saif Power Khulna	Debut
Walton Dhaka	Debut

=== Personnel and kits ===
The Bangladesh Hockey Federation have announced the Head coaches name of the teams on 26 September 2022.

Team	Head coach	Captain
Acme Chattogram	(Pakistan) Waseem Ahmad	Rezaul Karim Babu
Metro Express Barishal	(South Korea) Song Seung-tae	Roman Sarkar
Monarch Mart Padma	(South Korea) Yu Seung-Jin	Imran Hasan
Rupayan City Cumilla	(South Korea) Young Kyu	Shohanur Rahman Sobuj
Saif Power Group Khulna	(Malaysia) Dhaarma Raj Abdullah	Khorshadur Rahman
Walton Dhaka	(Malaysia) Shafiul Azli	Ashraful Islam

=== Teams on the map ===
Locations of HCT Bangladesh teams

== Point table ==
Pos	Team	Pld	W	WD	LD	L	GF	GA	GD	Pts
1	Acme Chattogram	10	6	0	1	3	31	22	+9	19
2	Rupayan City Cumilla	10	5	0	1	4	36	34	+2	16
3	Metro Express Barishal	10	5	0	1	4	15	14	+1	16
4	Monarch Padma	10	5	0	1	4	17	18	−1	16
5	Saif Power Group Khulna	10	4	0	0	6	14	20	−6	12
6	Walton Dhaka	10	3	0	0	7	20	30	−10	9

- advances to the Qualifier 1
- advances to the Eliminator

== League stage matches ==
28 October 2022
06:30 pm

ACME Chattogram	3–2	Saif Power Group Khulna
	Report

Maulana Bhasani Hockey Stadium

28 October 2022
08:45 pm

Monarch Mart Padma	2–3	Rupayan Group Cumilla

Maulana Bhasani Hockey Stadium

29 October 2022
6:30 pm

Walton Dhaka	1–2	Metro Express Barishal

Maulana Bhasani Hockey Stadium

29 October 2022
08:45 pm

Monarch Mart Padma	1–7	ACME Chattogram
	Report

Maulana Bhasani Hockey Stadium

31 October 2022
6:30 pm

Walton Dhaka	4:3	Rupayan City Cumilla

Maulana Bhasani Hockey Stadium

31 October 2022
08:45 pm

Metro Express Barishal	5–2	Saif Power Group Khulna

Maulana Bhasani Hockey Stadium

1 November 2022
6:30 pm

Saif Power Group Khulna	3–6	Monarch Mart Padma

Maulana Bhasani Hockey Stadium

1 November 2022
8:45 pm

Acme Chattogram	3–4	Metro Express Barishal

Maulana Bhasani Hockey Stadium

2 November 2022
6:30 pm

Monarch Padma	3–4	Rupayan City Cumilla

Maulana Bhasani Hockey Stadium

2 November 2022
8:45 pm

Walton Dhaka	1–3	Acme Chattogram

Maulana Bhasani Hockey Stadium

3 November 2022
6:30 pm

Metro Express Barishal	3–4	Rupayan City Cumilla

Maulana Bhasani Hockey Stadium

3 November 2022
8:45 pm

Walton Dhaka	5–2	Saif Power Group Khulna

Maulana Bhasani Hockey Stadium

4 November 2022
6:30 pm

Metro Express Barishal	4–1	Monarch Padma

Maulana Bhasani Hockey Stadium

4 November 2022
8:45 pm

Saif Power Group Khulna	0–1	Acme Chattogram

Maulana Bhasani Hockey Stadium

5 November 2022
6:30 pm

Monarch Mart Padma	6–3	Walton Dhaka

Maulana Bhasani Hockey Stadium

5 November 2022
8:45 pm

Rupayan City Cumilla	4–4	Acme Chattogram

Maulana Bhasani Hockey Stadium

6 November 2022
6:30 pm

Walton Dhaka	3–5	Saif Power Group Khulna

Maulana Bhasani Hockey Stadium

6 November 2022
8:45 pm

Rupayan City Cumilla	4–1	Metro Express Barishal

Maulana Bhasani Hockey Stadium

7 November 2022
6:30 pm

Monarch Padma	4–3	Acme Chattogram

Maulana Bhasani Hockey Stadium

7 November 2022
8:45 pm

Rupayan City Cumilla	4–3	Metro Express Barishal

Maulana Bhasani Hockey Stadium

8 November 2022
6:30 pm

Rupayan City Cumilla	2–3	Acme Chattogram

Maulana Bhasani Hockey Stadium

8 November 2022
8:45 pm

Walton Dhaka	0–2	Monarch Padma

Maulana Bhasani Hockey Stadium

9 November 2022
6:30 pm

Rupayan City Cumilla	1–3	Saif Power Group Khulna

Maulana Bhasani Hockey Stadium

9 November 2022
8:45 pm

Walton Dhaka	2–4	Metro Express Barishal

Maulana Bhasani Hockey Stadium

10 November 2022
6:30 pm

Monarch Padma	2–1	Saif Power Group Khulna

Maulana Bhasani Hockey Stadium

10 November 2022
8:45 pm

Metro Express Barishal	1–5	Acme Chattogram

Maulana Bhasani Hockey Stadium

11 November 2022
2:30 pm

Rupayan City Cumilla	6–4	Walton Dhaka

Maulana Bhasani Hockey Stadium

12 November 2022
4:30 pm

Monarch Padma	2–2	Metro Express Barishal

Maulana Bhasani Hockey Stadium

12 November 2022
6:30 pm

Acme Chattogram	3–7	Walton Dhaka

Maulana Bhasani Hockey Stadium

12 November 2022
8:45 pm

Saif Power Group Khulna	3–2	Rupayan City Cumilla

Maulana Bhasani Hockey Stadium

== Playoffs ==
Semifinals
Acme Chattogram	2
Rupayan City Cumilla	1
Monarch Padma	2
Metro Express Barishal	1

Preliminary final
Rupayan City Cumilla	3
Monarch Padma	4

Final
Acme Chattogram (p.s.o.)	2 (4)
Monarch Padma	2 (3)

=== Qualifier-1 ===
14 November 2022
6:30 pm

Acme Chattogram	2–1	Rupayan City Cumilla

Maulana Bhasani Hockey Stadium

=== Eilimanator ===
14 November 2022
8:45 pm

Metro Express Barishal	1–2	Monarch Padma

Maulana Bhasani Hockey Stadium

=== Qualifiers 2 ===
15 November 2022
7:30 pm

Rupayan City Cumilla	3–4	Monarch Padma

Maulana Bhasani Hockey Stadium

=== Final ===
17 November 2022
6:30 pm

Acme Chattogram	2–2	Monarch Padma
Penalties
	4–3

Maulana Bhasani Hockey Stadium

== Statistics ==
=== Top goal scorers ===
Rank	Player	Team	Goals
1	(India) Devindar Walmiki	Acme Chattogram	18
2	(Bangladesh) MD. Ashraful Islam	Walton Dhaka	12
3	(Bangladesh) Shohanur Rahman	Rupayan City Cumilla	11
4	(South Korea) Kim Sung Yeob	Rupayan City Cumilla	9
5	(Malaysia) Akhimullah Eshook	Metro Express Barishal	7
Total goals scored 197

=== Awards ===
- Man of the match (final) - Arshad
- Most promising player - Obaidul Haque Joy
- Best Goalkeeper - Asim Gope
- Highest Scorer - Devindar Walmiki
- Player of the tournament - Devindar Walmiki
- Fairplay award - Metro Express Barishal

== Sponsors ==
Title sponsor

- DMCB

Associate sponsors

- Banglalink
- Prime Bank
- Asian Paints
- Share Trip
- Holiday Inn
- Aamra
