= Field hockey at the 2020 Summer Olympics – Men's team squads =

This article shows the squads of all participating teams at the men's field hockey tournament at the 2020 Summer Olympics in Tokyo.

In July 2021, the IOC allowed teams to nominate up to 18 players instead of the usual 16, due to the COVID-19 pandemic.

Age, caps and club as of 24 July 2021.

== Group A ==
=== Argentina ===
The squad was announced on 14 June 2021.

Head coach: Carlos Retegui

No.	Pos.	Player	Date of birth (age)	Caps	Goals	Club
1	GK	Juan Manuel Vivaldi	17 July 1979 (aged 42)	288	0	(Argentina) Banco Provincia
5	DF	Pedro Ibarra (Captain)	11 September 1985 (aged 35)	310	6	(Argentina) San Fernando
6	MF	Santiago Tarazona	31 May 1996 (aged 25)	64	3	(Argentina) GEBA
7	FW	Nicolás Keenan	6 May 1997 (aged 24)	31	6	(Netherlands) Klein Zwitserland
8	MF	Nahuel Salis	6 August 1989 (aged 31)	81	5	(Belgium) Daring
9	MF	Maico Casella	5 June 1997 (aged 24)	77	31	(Netherlands) HGC
12	FW	Lucas Vila	23 August 1986 (aged 34)	256	86	(Belgium) Leuven
13	DF	Leandro Tolini	14 March 1990 (aged 31)	76	48	(Belgium) Gantoise
15	MF	Diego Paz	10 August 1992 (aged 28)	37	1	(Argentina) Ciudad
16	MF	Ignacio Ortiz	26 July 1987 (aged 33)	174	17	(Argentina) Banco Provincia
17	MF	Juan Martín López	27 May 1985 (aged 36)	316	12	(Argentina) Banco Provincia
22	MF	Matías Rey	1 December 1984 (aged 36)	217	7	(Spain) Real Club de Polo
23	FW	Lucas Martínez	17 November 1993 (aged 27)	78	12	(Belgium) Dragons
24	DF	Nicolás Cicileo	1 October 1993 (aged 27)	58	0	(Belgium) Daring
26	MF	Agustín Mazzilli	20 June 1989 (aged 32)	227	58	(Netherlands) Pinoké
27	DF	Lucas Rossi	2 June 1985 (aged 36)	213	11	(Belgium) Beerschot
29	MF	Thomas Habif	27 May 1996 (aged 25)	10	0	(Argentina) GEBA
30	FW	Agustín Bugallo	23 April 1995 (aged 26)	83	3	(Netherlands) HGC

Reserve:

- Emiliano Bosso

=== Australia ===
The squad was announced on 14 June 2021.

Head coach: Colin Batch

No.	Pos.	Player	Date of birth (age)	Caps	Goals	Club
1	MF	Lachlan Sharp	2 July 1997 (aged 24)	54	11	(Australia) NSW Pride
2	MF	Tom Craig	3 September 1995 (aged 25)	101	29	(Australia) NSW Pride
5	FW	Tom Wickham	26 May 1990 (aged 31)	59	27	(Australia) Perth Thundersticks
6	DF	Matt Dawson	27 April 1994 (aged 27)	146	12	(Australia) NSW Pride
10	MF	Joshua Beltz	24 April 1995 (aged 26)	46	3	(Australia) Tassie Tigers
11	DF	Eddie Ockenden (Captain)	3 April 1987 (aged 34)	372	71	(Australia) Tassie Tigers
12	MF	Jacob Whetton	15 June 1991 (aged 30)	209	65	(Australia) Brisbane Blaze
13	FW	Blake Govers	6 July 1996 (aged 25)	103	89	(Australia) NSW Pride
14	DF	Dylan Martin	12 January 1998 (aged 23)	6	0	(Australia) NSW Pride
15	DF	Joshua Simmonds	4 October 1995 (aged 25)	24	1	(Australia) HC Melbourne
16	DF	Tim Howard	23 June 1996 (aged 25)	66	1	(Australia) Brisbane Blaze
17	MF	Aran Zalewski (Captain)	21 March 1991 (aged 30)	193	25	(Australia) Perth Thundersticks
22	MF	Flynn Ogilvie	17 September 1993 (aged 27)	115	22	(Australia) NSW Pride
23	MF	Daniel Beale	12 February 1993 (aged 28)	183	28	(Australia) Brisbane Blaze
25	FW	Trent Mitton	26 November 1990 (aged 30)	177	82	(Australia) Perth Thundersticks
29	FW	Tim Brand	29 November 1998 (aged 22)	45	18	(Australia) NSW Pride
30	GK	Andrew Charter	30 March 1987 (aged 34)	185	0	(Australia) Canberra Chill
32	DF	Jeremy Hayward	3 March 1993 (aged 28)	162	70	(Australia) Tassie Tigers

Reserve:

- Tyler Lovell

=== India ===
The squad was announced on 18 June 2021.

Head coach: Graham Reid

No.	Pos.	Player	Date of birth (age)	Caps	Goals	Club
2	FW	Dilpreet Singh	12 November 1999 (aged 21)	44	18	(India) Petroleum Sports Promotion Board
3	DF	Rupinder Pal Singh	11 November 1990 (aged 30)	216	115	(India) Indian Overseas Bank
6	DF	Surender Kumar	23 November 1993 (aged 27)	135	3	Food Corporation of India
7	MF	Manpreet Singh (Captain)	26 June 1992 (aged 29)	269	22	(India) Punjab Armed Police
8	MF	Hardik Singh	23 September 1998 (aged 22)	39	1	(India) Petroleum Sports Promotion Board
9	FW	Gurjant Singh	26 January 1995 (aged 26)	47	15	(India) Petroleum Sports Promotion Board
10	FW	Simranjeet Singh	27 December 1996 (aged 24)	47	13	(India) Petroleum Sports Promotion Board
11	FW	Mandeep Singh	25 January 1995 (aged 26)	159	82	(India) Petroleum Sports Promotion Board
13	DF	Harmanpreet Singh	6 January 1996 (aged 25)	119	74	(India) Petroleum Sports Promotion Board
14	FW	Lalit Upadhyay	1 December 1993 (aged 27)	108	26	(India) Petroleum Sports Promotion Board
16	GK	P. R. Sreejesh	8 May 1988 (aged 33)	236	0	(India) Kerala
17	MF	Sumit Walmiki	20 December 1996 (aged 24)	66	2	(India) Petroleum Sports Promotion Board
18	MF	Nilakanta Sharma	2 May 1995 (aged 26)	59	11	(India) Petroleum Sports Promotion Board
21	FW	Shamsher Singh	29 July 1997 (aged 23)	6	1	(India) Punjab National Bank
22	DF	Varun Kumar	25 July 1995 (aged 25)	85	22	(India) Petroleum Sports Promotion Board
26	DF	Birendra Lakra	3 February 1990 (aged 31)	197	10	(India) Petroleum Sports Promotion Board
30	DF	Amit Rohidas	10 May 1993 (aged 28)	97	17	(India) Petroleum Sports Promotion Board
32	MF	Vivek Prasad	25 February 2000 (aged 21)	62	15	(India) Petroleum Sports Promotion Board

=== Japan ===
The squad was announced on 8 June 2021.

Head coach: (Netherlands) Siegfried Aikman

No.	Pos.	Player	Date of birth (age)	Caps	Goals	Club
1	FW	Koji Yamasaki	27 February 1996 (aged 25)	97	28	(Japan) Gifu Asahi Club
4	MF	Genki Mitani	12 June 1990 (aged 31)	168	6	(Japan) Vercosta Fukui
5	MF	Seren Tanaka	9 November 1992 (aged 28)	103	8	(Japan) Gifu Asahi Club
6	MF	Hiromasa Ochiai	9 February 1994 (aged 27)	75	5	(Japan) Tochigi Liebe
7	FW	Kazuma Murata	28 November 1991 (aged 29)	120	33	(Japan) Tochigi Liebe
9	FW	Kenta Tanaka	4 May 1988 (aged 33)	154	80	(Netherlands) HGC
11	FW	Kenji Kitazato	19 May 1989 (aged 32)	162	50	(Japan) Alder Hanno
12	MF	Yuma Nagai	18 March 1996 (aged 25)	11	0	(Japan) Gifu Asahi Club
13	DF	Manabu Yamashita (Captain)	4 February 1989 (aged 32)	186	1	(Japan) Oyabe Redox
14	MF	Kaito Tanaka	1 November 1995 (aged 25)	45	5	(Japan) Indicator Light Fullertel
15	MF	Ken Nagayoshi	26 October 1999 (aged 21)	12	0	(Japan) Tenri University Bears
17	FW	Kentaro Fukuda	27 July 1995 (aged 25)	69	15	(Japan) Gifu Asahi Club
20	DF	Masaki Ohashi	8 May 1993 (aged 28)	94	0	(Japan) Tochigi Liebe
25	DF	Shota Yamada	21 December 1994 (aged 26)	102	32	(Japan) Gifu Asahi Club
29	DF	Hirotaka Zendana	14 February 1993 (aged 28)	119	30	(Japan) Tenri University Bears
30	GK	Takashi Yoshikawa	29 November 1994 (aged 26)	94	0	(Japan) Gifu Asahi Club
31	FW	Kota Watanabe	30 October 1996 (aged 24)	74	8	(Japan) Vercosta Fukui
32	DF	Yoshiki Kirishita	27 December 1998 (aged 22)	55	4	(Japan) Tochigi Liebe

Reserve:

- Yusuke Tanako (GK)

=== New Zealand ===
The squad was announced on 10 June 2021.

Head coach: Darren Smith

No.	Pos.	Player	Date of birth (age)	Caps	Goals	Club
3	DF	David Brydon	27 June 1996 (aged 25)	58	0	(New Zealand) Southern Alpiners
4	DF	Dane Lett	29 August 1990 (aged 30)	83	2	(New Zealand) Central Falcons
7	MF	Nicholas Ross	26 July 1990 (aged 30)	133	4	(New Zealand) Southern Alpiners
11	FW	Jacob Smith	3 April 1991 (aged 30)	89	12	(New Zealand) Central Falcons
12	FW	Sam Lane	30 April 1997 (aged 24)	70	21	(New Zealand) Southern Alpiners
14	MF	Jared Panchia	18 October 1993 (aged 27)	139	26	(New Zealand) Hauraki Mavericks
17	DF	Nicholas Woods	26 August 1995 (aged 25)	131	21	(New Zealand) Hauraki Mavericks
20	GK	Leon Hayward	23 April 1990 (aged 31)	12	0	(New Zealand) Hauraki Mavericks
21	DF	Kane Russell	22 April 1992 (aged 29)	167	71	(New Zealand) Southern Alpiners
22	DF	Blair Tarrant (Captain)	11 May 1990 (aged 31)	217	4	(New Zealand) Southern Alpiners
23	MF	Dylan Thomas	14 February 1996 (aged 25)	32	2	(New Zealand) Central Falcons
24	MF	Sean Findlay	5 December 2001 (aged 19)	6	1	(New Zealand) Central Falcons
25	DF	Shea McAleese	7 August 1984 (aged 36)	316	34	(New Zealand) Central Falcons
27	FW	Stephen Jenness	7 June 1990 (aged 31)	254	92	(New Zealand) Central Falcons
29	MF	Hugo Inglis	18 January 1991 (aged 30)	237	66	(New Zealand) Southern Alpiners
30	FW	George Muir	24 February 1994 (aged 27)	146	18	(New Zealand) North Harbour
31	MF	Steve Edwards	25 January 1986 (aged 35)	226	23	(New Zealand) Northern Tridents
32	FW	Nicholas Wilson	6 August 1990 (aged 30)	176	77	(New Zealand) Central Falcons

=== Spain ===
The squad was announced on 5 July 2021. On 9 July, Joan Tarrés withdrew injured and was replaced by Llorenç Piera.

Head coach: (France) Fred Soyez

No.	Pos.	Player	Date of birth (age)	Caps	Goals	Club
1	GK	Quico Cortés	29 March 1983 (aged 38)	310	0	(Spain) Club Egara
2	DF	Alejandro Alonso	14 February 1999 (aged 22)	9	0	(Spain) Tenis
3	DF	Josep Romeu	22 May 1990 (aged 31)	142	24	(Spain) Club Egara
4	DF	Ricardo Sánchez	4 December 1992 (aged 28)	91	9	(Spain) Club de Campo
6	MF	Marc Salles	6 May 1987 (aged 34)	250	9	(Spain) Atlètic Terrassa
7	DF	Miquel Delas (Captain)	13 April 1984 (aged 37)	264	10	(Spain) Barcelona
8	MF	Quique González	29 April 1996 (aged 25)	119	17	(Spain) Club de Campo
9	MF	Álvaro Iglesias	1 March 1993 (aged 28)	147	34	(Spain) Club de Campo
10	FW	David Alegre	6 September 1984 (aged 36)	281	32	(Spain) Real Club de Polo
11	MF	Roc Oliva	18 July 1989 (aged 32)	175	18	(Spain) Real Club de Polo
12	DF	Marc Recasens	13 September 1999 (aged 21)	19	0	(Spain) Club Egara
13	DF	Llorenç Piera	4 November 1996 (aged 24)	41	0	(Spain) Real Club de Polo
17	FW	Xavi Lleonart	22 June 1990 (aged 31)	208	41	(Spain) Real Club de Polo
19	FW	José Basterra	3 January 1997 (aged 24)	8	2	(Spain) Club de Campo
21	MF	Viçens Ruiz	30 October 1991 (aged 29)	169	12	(Spain) Real Club de Polo
22	FW	Albert Béltran	23 October 1993 (aged 27)	88	27	(Spain) Atlètic Terrassa
25	FW	Pau Quemada	4 September 1983 (aged 37)	283	119	(Spain) Club Egara
27	MF	Marc Boltó	21 November 1995 (aged 25)	80	8	(Spain) Atlètic Terrassa

Reserve:

- Mario Garín

== Group B ==
=== Belgium ===
The squad was announced on 24 June 2021.

Head coach: (New Zealand) Shane McLeod

No.	Pos.	Player	Date of birth (age)	Caps	Goals	Club
4	DF	Arthur Van Doren	1 October 1994 (aged 26)	197	9	(Netherlands) Bloemendaal
7	MF	John-John Dohmen	24 January 1988 (aged 33)	408	27	(Belgium) Orée
8	FW	Florent Van Aubel	25 October 1991 (aged 29)	246	47	(Belgium) Dragons
9	FW	Sébastien Dockier	28 December 1989 (aged 31)	208	60	(Netherlands) Pinoké
10	FW	Cédric Charlier	27 November 1987 (aged 33)	328	50	(Belgium) Dragons
12	DF	Gauthier Boccard	26 August 1991 (aged 29)	233	13	(Belgium) Waterloo Ducks
13	FW	Nicolas De Kerpel	23 March 1993 (aged 28)	72	13	(Belgium) Herakles
14	MF	Augustin Meurmans	29 May 1997 (aged 24)	71	0	(Belgium) Racing
16	DF	Alexander Hendrickx	6 August 1993 (aged 27)	139	50	(Netherlands) Pinoké
17	FW	Thomas Briels	23 August 1987 (aged 33)	352	40	(Netherlands) Oranje-Rood
19	MF	Félix Denayer (Captain)	31 January 1990 (aged 31)	334	20	(Belgium) Dragons
21	GK	Vincent Vanasch	21 December 1987 (aged 33)	244	0	(Germany) Rot-Weiss Köln
22	MF	Simon Gougnard	17 January 1991 (aged 30)	292	20	(Belgium) Leuven
23	DF	Arthur De Sloover	3 May 1997 (aged 24)	96	0	(Belgium) Beerschot
24	MF	Antoine Kina	13 February 1996 (aged 25)	80	6	(Belgium) Gantoise
25	DF	Loïck Luypaert	19 August 1991 (aged 29)	254	44	(Belgium) Braxgata
26	MF	Victor Wegnez	25 December 1995 (aged 25)	101	11	(Belgium) Racing
27	FW	Tom Boon	25 January 1990 (aged 31)	304	124	(Belgium) Léopold

Reserve:

- Loic Van Doren

=== Canada ===
Canada's team roster of 16 athletes was named on June 28, 2021. Before the expansion of each roster, the alternates were Taylor Curran and Brandon Pereira.

Head coach: (Netherlands) Pasha Gademan

No.	Pos.	Player	Date of birth (age)	Caps	Goals	Club
1	MF	Floris Van Son	5 February 1992 (aged 29)	35	7	(Netherlands) AMVJ
3	DF	Brandon Pereira	30 April 1996 (aged 25)	61	0	(Canada) United Brothers
4	DF	Scott Tupper (Captain)	16 December 1986 (aged 34)	315	126	(Canada) West Vancouver
7	MF	Gabriel Ho-Garcia	19 May 1993 (aged 28)	133	19	(Canada) Burnaby Lakers
8	MF	Oliver Scholfield	11 September 1993 (aged 27)	71	16	(Canada) Vancouver Hawks
10	FW	Keegan Pereira	8 September 1991 (aged 29)	182	36	(Canada) India Club
13	MF	Brendan Guraliuk	14 May 2000 (aged 21)	7	0	(Canada) UBC
16	DF	Gordon Johnston	30 January 1993 (aged 28)	179	51	(Canada) Vancouver Hawks
17	DF	Brenden Bissett	28 January 1993 (aged 28)	139	11	(Canada) Vancouver Hawks
18	FW	Jamie Wallace	14 September 1999 (aged 21)	46	13	(Canada) UBC
19	FW	Mark Pearson	18 June 1987 (aged 34)	277	67	(Canada) West Vancouver
20	FW	Fin Boothroyd	9 March 1999 (aged 22)	23	4	(Canada) West Vancouver
21	FW	Matthew Sarmento	23 June 1991 (aged 30)	121	26	(Canada) Vancouver Hawks
22	DF	John Smythe	31 August 1989 (aged 31)	121	3	(Canada) Vancouver Hawks
24	DF	James Kirkpatrick	29 March 1991 (aged 30)	100	9	(Canada) West Vancouver
27	MF	Sukhi Panesar	26 December 1993 (aged 27)	151	7	(Canada) United Brothers
29	MF	Taylor Curran	19 May 1992 (aged 29)	185	7	(Canada) West Vancouver
31	GK	Antoni Kindler	16 May 1988 (aged 33)	97	0	(Canada) West Vancouver

Reserve:

- David Vandenbossche

=== Germany ===
The squad was announced on 28 May 2021.

Head coach: Kais al Saadi

No.	Pos.	Player	Date of birth (age)	Caps	Goals	Club
1	GK	Alexander Stadler	16 October 1999 (aged 21)	9	0	(Germany) TSV Mannheim
3	MF	Mats Grambusch	4 November 1992 (aged 28)	152	49	(Germany) Rot-Weiss Köln
4	DF	Lukas Windfeder	11 May 1995 (aged 26)	122	40	(Germany) Uhlenhorst Mülheim
5	DF	Linus Müller	2 December 1999 (aged 21)	17	1	(Germany) Mannheimer HC
6	DF	Martin Häner	27 August 1988 (aged 32)	262	30	(Germany) Berliner HC
8	MF	Paul-Philipp Kaufmann	21 June 1996 (aged 25)	16	3	(Germany) TSV Mannheim
9	FW	Niklas Wellen	14 December 1994 (aged 26)	149	45	(Netherlands) Pinoké
10	DF	Johannes Große	7 January 1997 (aged 24)	66	0	(Germany) Rot-Weiss Köln
11	FW	Constantin Staib	31 August 1995 (aged 25)	79	29	(Germany) Hamburger Polo Club
12	FW	Timm Herzbruch	7 June 1997 (aged 24)	84	41	(Germany) Uhlenhorst Mülheim
13	MF	Tobias Hauke (Captain)	11 September 1987 (aged 33)	324	15	(Germany) Harvestehude
17	FW	Christopher Rühr	19 December 1993 (aged 27)	142	64	(Germany) Rot-Weiss Köln
19	FW	Justus Weigand	20 April 2000 (aged 21)	10	3	(Germany) Mannheimer HC
20	MF	Martin Zwicker	27 February 1987 (aged 34)	247	24	(Germany) Berliner HC
23	FW	Florian Fuchs	10 November 1991 (aged 29)	229	111	(Netherlands) Bloemendaal
24	DF	Benedikt Fürk	20 October 1988 (aged 32)	178	7	(Germany) Uhlenhorst Mülheim
26	DF	Niklas Bosserhoff	15 April 1998 (aged 23)	31	3	(Germany) Uhlenhorst Mülheim
27	MF	Timur Oruz	27 October 1994 (aged 26)	87	13	(Germany) Rot-Weiss Köln

Reserve:

- Victor Aly

=== Great Britain ===
The squad was announced on 17 June 2021.

Head coach: Danny Kerry

No.	Pos.	Player	Date of birth (age)	Caps	Goals	Club
5	DF	David Ames	25 June 1989 (aged 32)	101	{{{goals}}}	(England) Holcombe
6	MF	Jacob Draper	24 July 1998 (aged 23)	66	{{{goals}}}	(England) Hampstead & Westminster
7	FW	Alan Forsyth	5 April 1992 (aged 29)	189	{{{goals}}}	(England) Surbiton
8	FW	Rupert Shipperley	21 November 1992 (aged 28)	87	{{{goals}}}	(England) Hampstead & Westminster
9	MF	Harry Martin	23 October 1992 (aged 28)	238	{{{goals}}}	(England) Hampstead & Westminster
10	FW	Chris Griffiths	3 September 1990 (aged 30)	112	{{{goals}}}	(England) Old Georgians
11	MF	Ian Sloan	19 November 1993 (aged 27)	112	{{{goals}}}	(England) Wimbledon
13	FW	Sam Ward	24 December 1990 (aged 30)	135	{{{goals}}}	(England) Old Georgians
15	FW	Phil Roper	24 January 1992 (aged 29)	155	{{{goals}}}	(England) Wimbledon
16	MF	Adam Dixon (Captain)	11 September 1986 (aged 34)	284	{{{goals}}}	(England) Beeston
18	DF	Brendan Creed	3 January 1993 (aged 28)	87	{{{goals}}}	(England) Surbiton
20	GK	Ollie Payne	6 April 1999 (aged 22)	11	{{{goals}}}	(England) Holcombe
21	FW	Liam Ansell	12 November 1993 (aged 27)	54	{{{goals}}}	(England) Wimbledon
25	DF	Jack Waller	28 January 1997 (aged 24)	55	{{{goals}}}	(England) Wimbledon
26	MF	James Gall	20 May 1995 (aged 26)	88	{{{goals}}}	(England) Surbiton
27	DF	Liam Sanford	14 March 1996 (aged 25)	69	{{{goals}}}	(England) Old Georgians
29	DF	Tom Sorsby	28 October 1996 (aged 24)	39	{{{goals}}}	(England) Surbiton
32	FW	Zach Wallace	29 September 1999 (aged 21)	55	{{{goals}}}	(England) Surbiton

=== Netherlands ===
The squad was announced on 28 May 2021.

Head coach: (Argentina) Maximiliano Caldas

No.	Pos.	Player	Date of birth (age)	Caps	Goals	Club
2	FW	Jeroen Hertzberger	24 February 1986 (aged 35)	259	90	(Netherlands) Rotterdam
4	DF	Lars Balk	26 February 1996 (aged 25)	71	3	(Netherlands) Kampong
6	DF	Jonas de Geus	29 April 1998 (aged 23)	87	0	(Netherlands) Kampong
7	FW	Thijs van Dam	5 January 1997 (aged 24)	54	7	(Netherlands) Rotterdam
8	MF	Billy Bakker (Captain)	23 November 1988 (aged 32)	228	48	(Netherlands) Amsterdam
9	MF	Seve van Ass	10 April 1992 (aged 29)	182	25	(Netherlands) HGC
10	MF	Jorrit Croon	9 August 1998 (aged 22)	85	7	(Netherlands) Bloemendaal
11	MF	Glenn Schuurman	16 April 1991 (aged 30)	151	3	(Netherlands) Bloemendaal
12	DF	Sander de Wijn	2 May 1990 (aged 31)	154	6	(Netherlands) Kampong
14	MF	Robbert Kemperman	24 June 1990 (aged 31)	220	39	(Netherlands) Kampong
16	FW	Mirco Pruyser	11 August 1989 (aged 31)	134	72	(Netherlands) Amsterdam
17	FW	Roel Bovendeert	8 May 1992 (aged 29)	31	8	(Netherlands) Bloemendaal
23	DF	Joep de Mol	10 December 1995 (aged 25)	87	0	(Netherlands) Oranje-Rood
25	FW	Thierry Brinkman	19 March 1995 (aged 26)	111	38	(Netherlands) Bloemendaal
26	GK	Pirmin Blaak	8 March 1988 (aged 33)	106	0	(Netherlands) Oranje-Rood
27	DF	Jip Janssen	14 October 1997 (aged 23)	43	0	(Netherlands) Kampong
30	DF	Mink van der Weerden	19 December 1988 (aged 32)	183	100	(Germany) Rot-Weiss Köln
32	DF	Justen Blok	27 September 2000 (aged 20)	11	0	(Netherlands) Rotterdam

Reserve:

- Maurits Visser

=== South Africa ===
The squad was announced on 27 May 2021.

Head coach: Garreth Ewing

No.	Pos.	Player	Date of birth (age)	Caps	Goals	Club
2	FW	Mustaphaa Cassiem	19 March 2002 (aged 19)	8	7	(South Africa) Varsity College
3	DF	Tyson Dlungwana	18 February 1997 (aged 24)	47	0	(South Africa) Phoenix Hockey Club
5	DF	Austin Smith	20 May 1985 (aged 36)	178	67	(Netherlands) Den Bosch
7	DF	Timothy Drummond (Captain)	5 March 1988 (aged 33)	145	19	(Netherlands) Klein Zwitserland
8	MF	Nduduza Lembethe	13 January 1996 (aged 25)	33		(South Africa) University of Pretoria
10	FW	Keenan Horne	17 June 1992 (aged 29)	64		(South Africa) Central
13	DF	Matthew Guise-Brown	13 September 1991 (aged 29)	42	25	(England) Hampstead & Westminster
14	MF	Rusten Abrahams	16 December 1997 (aged 23)	10	2	(South Africa) University of the Witwatersrand
15	FW	Dayaan Cassiem	1 December 1998 (aged 22)	38	15	(Germany) Gladbacher HTC
17	FW	Ryan Julius	19 July 1995 (aged 26)	41		(Netherlands) Almeerse HC
18	MF	Taine Paton	4 January 1989 (aged 32)	115		(Belgium) Antwerp
20	FW	Tevin Kok	20 October 1996 (aged 24)	35		(South Africa) Kearsney
21	DF	Jethro Eustice	1 November 1989 (aged 31)	128	21	(South Africa) Kearsney
22	DF	Daniel Bell	28 September 1994 (aged 26)	58	11	(Belgium) Daring
23	GK	Rassie Pieterse	20 August 1983 (aged 37)	161		(South Africa) Wanderers Hockey Club
24	MF	Nicholas Spooner	28 August 1991 (aged 29)	26		(Germany) Harvestehuder THC
27	FW	Nqobile Ntuli	15 January 1996 (aged 25)	58	25	(South Africa) University of Pretoria
29	MF	Samkelo Mvimbi	23 January 1999 (aged 22)	14	1	(South Africa) University of Pretoria

Reserve:

- Siya Nolutshungu
