= Field hockey at the 2019 Pan American Games – Men's team rosters =

This article shows the rosters of all participating teams at the men's field hockey tournament at the 2019 Pan American Games in Lima, Peru. Rosters can have a maximum of 16 athletes.

Age and caps as of 29 July 2019 and clubs for which they played in the 2018–19 season.

== Pool A ==
=== Argentina ===
Argentina announced their squad on 12 July 2019.

Head Coach: Germán Orozco

No.	Pos.	Player	Date of birth (age)	Caps	Club
1	GK	Juan Manuel Vivaldi	17 July 1979 (aged 40)	264	(Argentina) Banco Provincia
5	DF	Pedro Ibarra (Captain)	11 September 1985 (aged 33)	282	(Argentina) San Fernando
7	FW	Nicolás Keenan	6 May 1997 (aged 22)	7	(Netherlands) Klein Zwitserland
9	FW	Maico Casella	5 June 1997 (aged 22)	49	(Argentina) San Fernando
10	FW	Matías Paredes	1 February 1982 (aged 37)	350	(Argentina) Ducilo
12	FW	Lucas Vila	23 August 1986 (aged 32)	231	(Germany) Mannheimer HC
13	DF	Leandro Tolini	14 March 1990 (aged 29)	48	(Belgium) Gantoise
16	MF	Ignacio Ortiz	26 July 1987 (aged 32)	147	(Argentina) Banco Provincia
17	DF	Juan Martín López	27 May 1985 (aged 34)	288	(Argentina) Banco Provincia
22	DF	Matías Rey	1 December 1984 (aged 34)	194	(Spain) Real Club de Polo
23	FW	Lucas Martínez	17 November 1993 (aged 25)	51	(Netherlands) Oranje-Rood
24	DF	Nicolás Cicileo	1 October 1993 (aged 25)	35	(Netherlands) Klein Zwitserland
26	MF	Agustín Mazzilli	20 June 1989 (aged 30)	212	(Netherlands) Pinoké
28	MF	Federico Fernández	28 February 1992 (aged 27)	27	(Argentina) Ba. Na. De.
30	MF	Agustín Bugallo	23 April 1995 (aged 24)	57	(Argentina) Mitre
32	FW	Martín Ferreiro	21 October 1997 (aged 21)	30	(Argentina) Lomas

== Pool B ==
=== Canada ===
Canada announced their squad on 17 June 2019.

Head coach: Paul Bundy

No.	Pos.	Player	Date of birth (age)	Caps	Club
3	DF	Brandon Pereira	30 April 1996 (aged 23)	54	(Canada) United Brothers
4	DF	Scott Tupper (Captain)	16 December 1986 (aged 32)	300	(Canada) West Vancouver
8	FW	Oliver Scholfield	11 September 1993 (aged 25)	57	(Canada) Vancouver Hawks
10	FW	Keegan Pereira	8 September 1991 (aged 27)	167	(Germany) Uhlenhorst Mülheim
11	DF	Balraj Panesar	16 March 1996 (aged 23)	64	(Canada) UBC Thunderbirds
14	MF	Adam Froese	13 August 1991 (aged 27)	183	(Canada) India Club
16	DF	Gordon Johnston	30 January 1993 (aged 26)	165	(Canada) Vancouver Hawks
17	MF	Brenden Bissett	28 January 1993 (aged 26)	124	(Canada) Vancouver Hawks
18	FW	James Wallace	14 September 1999 (aged 19)	35	(Canada) UBC Thunderbirds
19	FW	Matthew Pearson	18 June 1987 (aged 32)	268	(Canada) West Vancouver
22	DF	John Smythe	31 August 1989 (aged 29)	106	(Canada) Vancouver Hawks
23	FW	Iain Smythe	2 June 1985 (aged 34)	195	(Canada) Vancouver Hawks
24	MF	James Kirkpatrick	29 March 1991 (aged 28)	85	(Canada) West Vancouver
27	MF	Sukhi Panesar	26 December 1993 (aged 25)	137	(Canada) United Brothers
29	MF	Taylor Curran	19 May 1992 (aged 27)	173	(Canada) West Vancouver
30	GK	David Carter	4 November 1981 (aged 37)	187	(Canada) United Brothers

=== United States ===
The United States announced their squad on 9 July 2019.

Head coach: Rutger Wiese

No.	Pos.	Player	Date of birth (age)	Caps	Club
1	GK	Jonathan Klages	14 May 1997 (aged 22)	24	(Spain) Atletico San Sebastián
3	MF	Michael Barminski	11 February 1993 (aged 26)	81	(United States) Ventura Roadrunners
4	FW	Tyler Sundeen	21 December 1993 (aged 25)	103	(United States) LA Tigers
5	FW	Pat Harris	13 March 1985 (aged 34)	144	(Germany) Mannheimer HC
7	DF	Tom Barratt	6 August 1991 (aged 27)	72	(England) Beeston
9	DF	Adam Miller	15 March 1992 (aged 27)	67	(England) Southgate
10	FW	Alberto Montilla	24 January 1998 (aged 21)	7	(United States) Bulldogs
12	MF	Ajai Dhadwal (Captain)	13 August 1993 (aged 25)	113	
14	DF	Aki Käppeler	10 July 1994 (aged 25)	65	(Germany) TSV Mannheim
15	FW	Kei Käppeler	17 June 1997 (aged 22)	18	(Germany) TSV Mannheim
17	FW	Christian DeAngelis	13 February 1999 (aged 20)	26	(United States) WC Eagles
18	MF	Paul Singh	11 March 1993 (aged 26)	74	(United States) LA Tigers
20	MF	Sean Cicchi	23 March 1995 (aged 24)	97	(United States) Conejo Bulldogs
21	FW	Deegan Huisman	29 October 1997 (aged 21)	21	(Netherlands) Almere
22	DF	Johnny Orozco	18 February 1993 (aged 26)	89	
26	MF	Mohan Gandhi	17 March 1993 (aged 26)	92	(England) Beeston
