= Hockey Champions Trophy Bangladesh =

Bangladeshi men's field hockey league

- Sport: Field hockey
- Founded: 2022
- First season: 2022
- Administrator: Bangladesh Hockey Federation
- Organising body: ACE
- Motto: Hockey in heart (হকি ইন হার্ট)
- No. of teams: 6
- Country: Bangladesh
- Venue: Maulana Bhasani Hockey Stadium
- Most recent champion: Acme Chattogram (2022)
- Most titles: Acme Chattogram(1)
- Broadcaster: T Sports
- Sponsors: DMCB, Bashundhara Group, Prime Bank Limited, Banglalink, Asian Paints, Share Trip, Holiday Inn, Aamra
- Tournament format: Round-robin tournament & Playoffs
- 2022 Hockey Champions Trophy Bangladesh

The Hockey Champions Trophy Bangladesh (Bengali: হকি চ্যাম্পিয়নস ট্রফি বাংলাদেশ) simply known as HCT Bangladesh and officially as DMCB Hockey Champions Trophy Bangladesh for sponsorship reasons, is a men's professional field hockey league. It is Bangladesh's first ever franchise-based professional field hockey league. It is administrated by BHF and organized by ACE. It was formed in 2022. The inaugural season of the league was held in 2022.

== History ==
Hockey Champions Trophy Bangladesh is organized by Bangladesh Hockey Federation and ACE which is owned by Bashundhara Group. It was formed in 2022 and its inaugural took place in 2022. Walton, Monarch Mart, Acme, Rupayan Group, Metro Group and Saif Power Group bought the franchises.

DMCB became the title sponsor for the first season.

== Competition Format & rules ==
It will be a round-robin format competition. Top 4 teams from the point table will advance to the playoffs. The top two teams from the league phase will play against each other in the first Qualifying match, with the winner going straight to the final and the loser getting another chance to qualify for the final by playing the second Qualifying match. Meanwhile, the third and fourth-place teams from the league phase play against each other in an eliminator match and the winner from that match will play the loser from the first Qualifying match. The winner of the second Qualifying match will move on to the final to play the winner of the first Qualifying match in the Final match, where the winner will be crowned the league champions.

=== Player acquisition, squad composition and salaries ===
A team can acquire players from players draft and sign one player directly.

The local players are categorised as icon, A plus, A, B and C category players, while foreign players are as icon, A, B and six in reserved category players, listed in draft.

Team composition rules (as of 2022) are:

- The squad strength must be 17–18 players.
- A team can buy 17 players from players draft, with a maximum of 4 overseas players and 13 local players.
- A team can buy one local or foreign player directly.
- Two under-18 level local players are mandatory.
- A team can play maximum of 4 overseas players in their playing eleven of a match.

The term of a player contract is one year, with the franchise having the option to extend the contract.

=== Players draft ===
Six franchises can choose only a single player each from the list of icons after which the remaining players will drop down to the A+ category, where 15 players already feature. Unsold players from the A+ category will fall to A and so on. Teams are allowed to sign a maximum of 13 local players [one icon, two A+, three A, four B and three C], one direct signing and four foreign players to round out an 18-man squad.

== Venue ==
All matches will be played at Maulana Bhasani Hockey Stadium in Dhaka, Bangladesh.

Dhaka	Dhaka is located in Bangladesh
Maulana Bhasani Hockey Stadium	Dhaka is located in Bangladesh
Capacity: 10,000	Dhaka is located in Bangladesh

== Teams ==
On 8 September 2022 Bangladesh Hockey Federation have announced the name of participating teams.

Team	City	Head Coach	Captain	Debut	Owner
Acme Chattogram	Chattogram	(Pakistan) Waseem Ahmad	Rezaul Karim Babu	2022	Acme
Metro Express Barishal	Barishal	(South Korea) Song Seung-tae	Roman Sarkar	2022	Metro Group
Monarch Padma	Faridpur	(South Korea) Yu Seung-jin	Imran Hasan	2022	Shakib Al Hasan
Rupayan City Cumilla	Cumilla	(South Korea) Young Kyu	Shohanur Rahman Sobuj	2022	Rupayan Group
Saif Power Group Khulna	Khulna	(Malaysia) Dhaarma Raj Abdullah	Khorshadur Rahman	2022	Saif Power Group
Walton Dhaka	Dhaka	(Malaysia) Shafiul Azli	Ashraful Islam	2022	Walton Group

=== Teams on the map ===
Locations of HCT Bangladesh teams

== League championships ==
Season	Winner	Final score	Runner-up	Final venue	Number of Teams	Player of the tournament
2022	Acme Chattogram	2–2 (4–3 p.s.o.)	Monarch Padma	Maulana Bhasani Hockey Stadium	6	(India) Devindar Walmiki
