= Metro Express Barishal =

Bangladeshi field hockey team

- Full name: Metro Express Barishal
- Short name: MEB
- Sport: Field Hockey
- Founded: 2022
- First season: 2022
- League: Hockey Champions Trophy
- Based in: Barisal
- Home ground: Maulana Bhasani Hockey Stadium (10,000)
- Owner: Metro Group
- Head coach: (South Korea) Song Seung-tae
- Main sponsor: Metro Express

Metro Express Barishal (Bengali: মেট্রো এক্সপ্রেস বরিশাল) is a franchise field hockey team based in Barisal, Barisal Division, that takes part in the Hockey Champions Trophy. Founded in 2022, the team is owned by Metro Group. Ex-South Korean international Song Seung-tae serves as the head coach for the team.

== History ==
Metro Express Barishal are one of the founding teams of the Hockey Champions Trophy, which is the country's first franchise hockey league. The club was established on 8 September 2022, by the Metro Group, a conglomerate which has been present in Bangladesh since independence.

== Personnel ==
=== Current technical staff ===
As of 1 October 2022

Position	Name
Head coach	(South Korea) Song Seung-tae
Assistant Coach	(Bangladesh) Moududur Rahman Shuvo

== Roster ==
As of October 2022

No.	Player	Position	Country	Notes
1	Roman Sarkar		(Bangladesh)	captain
2	Juan Martin Lopez	Defender	(Argentina)	Overseas
3	Asim Gope	Goalkeeper	(Bangladesh)	
4	Fazle Hossain Rabbi		(Bangladesh)	
5	Woo Sung Ho		(South Korea)	Overseas
6	Akhimullah Isuk		(Malaysia)	Overseas
7	Sarwar Murshed		(Bangladesh)	
8	Mahbub Hossain		(Bangladesh)	
9	Deen Islam Emon		(Bangladesh)	
10	Fitri Saari	Midfielder	(Malaysia)	Overseas
11	Md Nuruzzaman		(Bangladesh)	
12	Shahidul Haque Soikat		(Bangladesh)	
13	Azizar Rahman		(Bangladesh)	
14	Mamunur Rahman Chayan		(Bangladesh)	
15	Md Asaduzzaman		(Bangladesh)	
16	Sajedul Islam		(Bangladesh)	
17	Shamim Mia		(Bangladesh)	
18	Andrés Mir Bel	Defender/Midfielder	(Spain)	Overseas

== Seasons ==
Year	League Table Standing	Final Standing
2022	4th out of 6	4th
