= Anvir Adil Khan Babu =

Bangladeshi national field hockey player and politician

- আনভীর আদিল খান বাবু
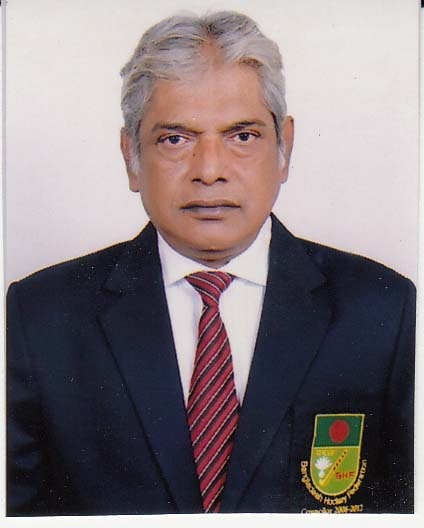
- Born: 10 May 1954; Shantinagar, Dhaka, Bangladesh
- Died: 28 August 2021; Dhaka, Bangladesh
- Resting place: Banani Koborsthan, Banani, Dhaka
- Occupations: Field hockey player; Sports administrator; Politician
- Known for: Goalkeeper of Bangladesh national hockey team; Manager of Bangladesh National Hockey Team; Joint Secretary of Bangladesh Hockey Federation; Vice President of Dhaka South Metropolitan BNP
- Political party: Bangladesh Nationalist Party
- Children: 2 sons
- Awards: Bangladesh Sports Press Association Award (1982); Bangladesh Sports Journalist Association Award (1983)

Anvir Adil Khan Babu (Bengali: আনভীর আদিল খান বাবু; c. 10 May 1954 – 28 August 2021) also lovingly called Hockey Babu (হকি বাবু) a Bangladeshi field hockey player, sports administrator, and politician. He served as the goalkeeper of the Bangladesh national field hockey team during the late 1970s and early 1980s, representing the country at the 1978 Asian Games, 1982 Asian Games, and the 1982 Men's Hockey Asia Cup. After retiring from active play, he served as Joint Secretary of the Bangladesh Hockey Federation and as a team manager for the national side. In politics, he was affiliated with the Bangladesh Nationalist Party (BNP) and served as Vice President of the Dhaka South Metropolitan BNP.

== Early life ==
Anvir Adil Khan Babu was born on 10 May 1954 to Mr Nurul Islam and Mrs Meherunessa Islam. He was born in Shantinagar, Dhaka, Bangladesh (then East Pakistan). He was the youngest of three children and showed promise in athletics and sports from a young age. He went to Residential Model School, Dhaka for his primary education and Abbottabad Public School, West Pakistan (now Pakistan) high school. In high school he excelled in sports specially swimming, football and cricket.

== Field hockey career ==
He played for various local sports clubs including Abahani Limited and Mohammadan Sporting Club who were arch rivals in Bangladesh sports arena. He also played for Shantinagar Sports Club.

=== Playing career ===
Anvir Adil Khan Babu was a goalkeeper who rose through Bangladeshi domestic hockey, representing prominent clubs including Mohammedan SC and Abahani Limited, among several others.

He made his international debut as Bangladesh's goalkeeper in the 1st Junior World Cup for Asia/Oceania zone (qualifiers) held in Malaysia in 1977. He went on to serve as first-choice goalkeeper for the Bangladesh national team across multiple major international tournaments, with his international playing career spanning from 1977 to 1982.

International tournament appearances
| Year | Tournament | Venue |
|---|---|---|
| 1977 | 1st Junior World Cup for Asia/Oceania zone (qualifying round) | Kuala Lumpur, Malaysia |
| 1978 | 1978 Asian Games (field hockey) | Bangkok, Thailand |
| 1978 | Sri Lanka national tour to Bangladesh | Dhaka, Bangladesh |
| 1982 | 1982 Men's Hockey Asia Cup | Karachi, Pakistan |
| 1982 | 1982 Asian Games (field hockey) | New Delhi, India |

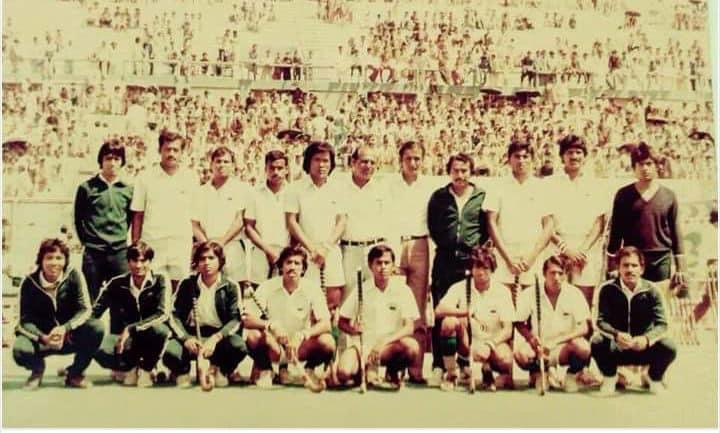
Anvir as goalkeeper of Bangladesh National Team in Asia Cup 1982

=== Awards and recognition ===
For his performances on the field, Anvir Adil Khan Babu was considered the best field hockey goalkeeper for his performance in 1978 Asian Games where he saved 29 goals even though Bangladesh lost to India 19-0. He received two national sports journalism awards:

- 1982 – Bangladesh Sports Press Association (BSPA) Best Player Award
- 1983 – Bangladesh Sports Journalist Association (BSJA) Best Player Award

== Sports administration ==
Following his retirement from playing field hockey after a motorcycle accident, Anvir Adil Khan Babu transitioned into sports administration. He served as team manager of the Bangladesh national hockey team between 2005 until 2012 and as a key organiser within the sport.

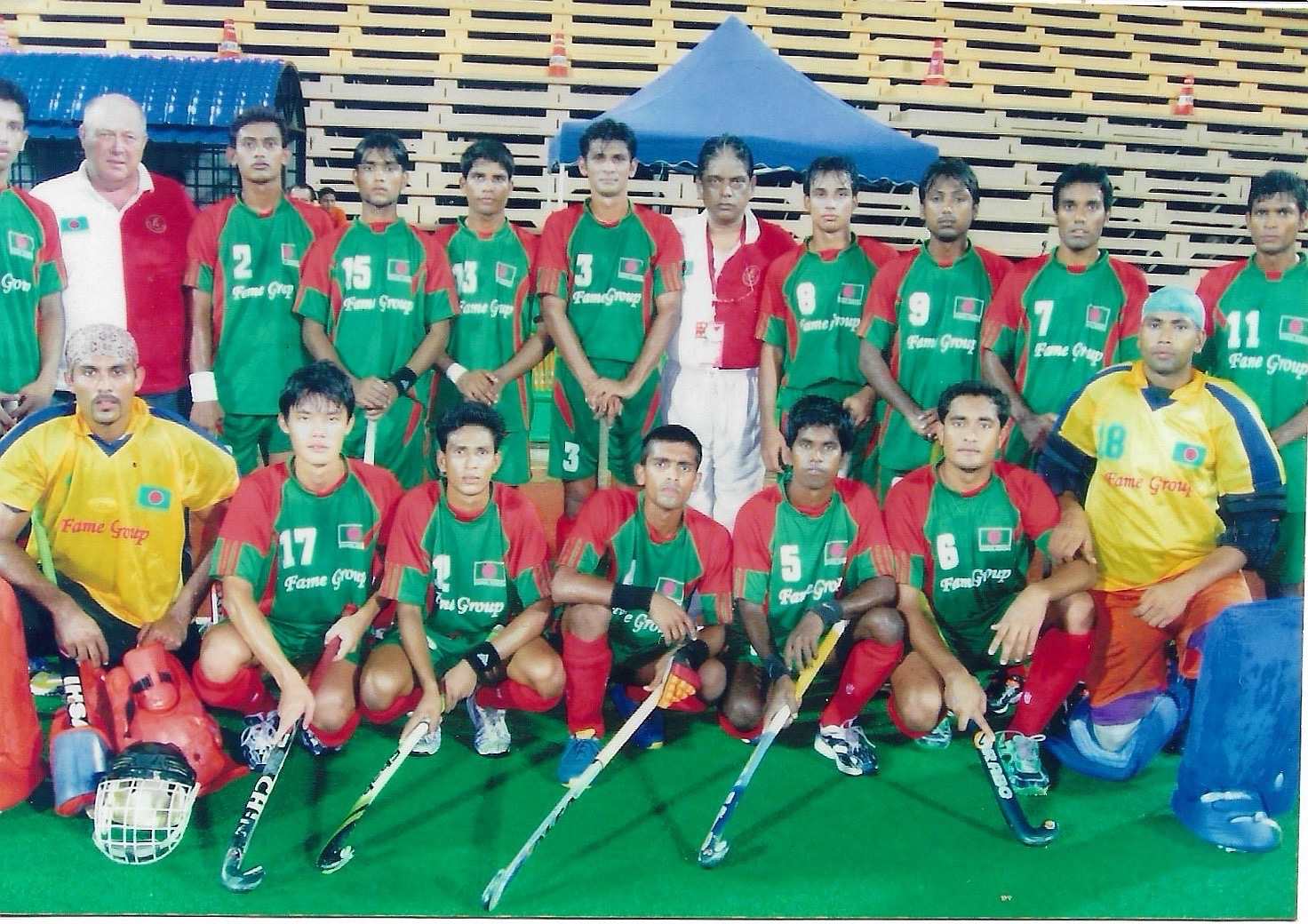
Bangladesh National team managed by Anvir (in the middle) in 2007

He served multiple terms as Joint Secretary of the Bangladesh Hockey Federation (BHF), with his final tenure ending in 2019.

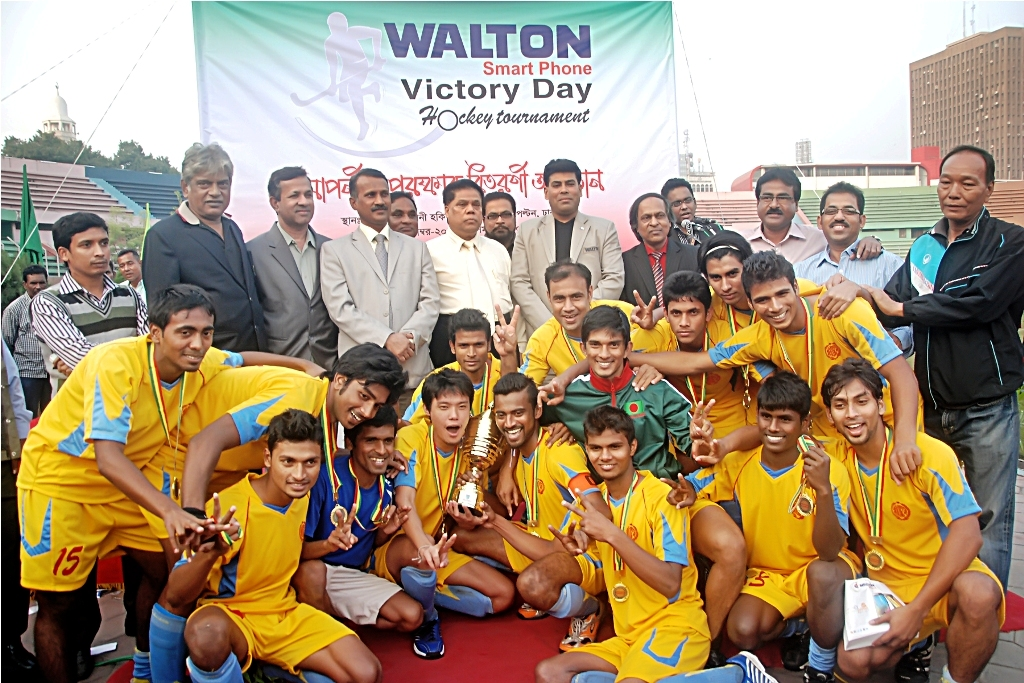
Opening ceremony of Walton victory day hockey tournament

He was associated with various sports organisations and sporting bodies in Bangladesh and Vice-president of Shantinagar Sporting Club (SSC). He rand and managed Shantinagar B Cricket team which played 2nd division cricket (1994-1998) and Shantinagar Sporting Club's field hockey team until his passing.

His death prompted an official statement of condolence from the Asian Hockey Federation, whose president Dato Tayyab Ikram expressed personal grief at the loss.

== Political career ==
Anvir Adil Khan Babu was a long-standing member and leader of the Bangladesh Nationalist Party (BNP). He held the position of President of Ward 62 (1989-1992), Vice President of Dhaka South Metropolitan BNP (ঢাকা দক্ষিণ মহানগর বিএনপির সহসভাপতি).

His popularity social activist and ties to the political party were evident at his death, when his second funeral prayer (janaza) was held in front of the BNP's central office in Naya Paltan, Dhaka, attended by leaders and activists from across the party and people from all walks of life. Mirza Abbas, a member of the BNP Standing Committee (elected MP in 2024 National Election and an advisor to the Prime Minister of Bangladesh), Md Abdul Salam, selected as the Administrator of DSCC in 2025 and an advisor to the Prime Minister of Bangladesh, was among those who paid Tribute and prayed in his janaza. His popularity and like ability as a sports personality and administrator were also evident at his third funeral prayer (janaza) was held in Maulana Bhashani National Hockey Stadium with attendance by renowned hockey players from both past and present as well as officials and players from all fraternity of sports.

== Death ==
Anvir Adil Khan Babu was admitted to a private hospital in Dhaka after suffering a heart attack. He underwent open-heart surgery and was placed in the intensive care unit (ICU). He passed away on 28 August 2021 at approximately 5:00 AM, due to heart disease and multiple other health complications, at the age of 68.

His first janaza was held at the place of his birth and residence in Shantinagar, Eastern Peace Apartment complex. His second janaza was held in front of BNP central office at Naya Paltan. His third janaza was held in Maulana Bhashani National Hockey Stadium. His fourth janaza was held after Zuhr prayers at a local mosque in the Shantinagar area of Dhaka, after which he was laid to rest at the Banani graveyard in Banani, Dhaka.

He was survived by his wife Afroza Sultana, two sons Raaef Rubayet Khan and Ihab Mayaz Khan.

== Legacy ==
Anvir Adil Khan Babu is remembered as one of the pioneering figures of Bangladeshi field hockey, having represented the country during the sport's formative years in the 1970s and 1980s. His contributions spanned over three decades — as a player, team manager, and federation administrator. The Bangladesh Hockey Federation issued a formal statement of mourning following his death, and the Asian Hockey Federation described his passing as a significant loss to Asian hockey.
