= Acme Chattogram =

Hockey team Chittagong

- Short name: AC
- Sport: Field Hockey
- Founded: 2022
- First season: 2022
- League: Hockey Champions Trophy Bangladesh
- Based in: Chittagong
- Stadium: Maulana Bhasani Hockey Stadium(10,000)
- Owner: Acme Group
- Head coach: Waseem Ahmed
- Captain: Rezaul Karim Babu
- League titles: 1(2022)
- Main sponsor: Acme Group

Acme Chattogram (Bengali: অ্যাকমি চট্টগ্রাম) is a professional field hockey team based in Chittagong. It is one of the founding teams of professional franchise field hockey league HCT Bangladesh. Founded in 2022, the team is owned by Acme Group.They are the champions of the inaugural season.

== History ==
Acme Group bought one of the six teams from the inaugural season of the Hockey Champions Trophy Bangladesh. Waseem Ahmad became the head coach of Acme Chattogram for the inaugural season.They became champion of the inaugural season.

== Current technical staff ==
As of October 2022

Role	Name
Head coach	Waseem Ahmad

== Current roster ==
As of October 2022

Name	Country
Rezaul Karim Babu (C)	(Bangladesh)
Forhad Ahmed Shitul	(Bangladesh)
Mehedi Hasan	(Bangladesh)
Sojibur Rahman	(Bangladesh)
Rajib Das	(Bangladesh)
Taher Ali	(Bangladesh)
Arshad Hossain	(Bangladesh)
Hasan Jubair Niloy	(Bangladesh)
Ashraful Alam	(Bangladesh)
Manoj Babu	(Bangladesh)
Mehedy Hasan	(Bangladesh)
Tasin Ali	(Bangladesh)
Kanchan Mia	(Bangladesh)
Devinder Walmiki	(India)
Peer Hinrichs	(Germany)
Ghazanfar Ali	(Pakistan)
Muhamad Hafiz Zainol	(Malaysia)
Bjorn Kellerman	(Netherlands)

== Seasons ==
Year	League Table Standing	Final Standing
2022	1st out of 6	Champions
