= Balraj Panesar =

Canadian field hockey player

Personal information
- Full name: Balraj Singh Panesar
- Born: March 16, 1996 (age 30) Surrey, British Columbia, Canada

Sport
- Sport: Field hockey
- Position: Defender / Midfielder
- Club: East Grinstead
National team
Years	Team	Caps	Goals
–	Canada	70	(2)
Medal record
Representing Canada
Men's field hockey
Pan American Games
Silver medal – second place	2019 Lima	Team
Bronze medal – third place	2023 Santiago	Team
Pan American Cup
Silver medal – second place	2017 Lancaster
Bronze medal – third place	2022 Santiago
Bronze medal – third place	2025 Montevideo
Pan American Junior Championship
Silver medal – second place	2016 Toronto
Men's Hockey5s
Summer Youth Olympics
Silver medal – second place	2014 Nanjing	Team
- Updated on 12 August 2019

Balraj Singh Panesar (born March 16, 1996) is a Canadian field hockey player who plays as a defender or midfielder for the English Premier Club Beeston HC and the Canadian national team.

== Early life ==
Panesar was born on March 16, 1996, in Surrey, British Columbia. He was introduced to the sport by his father; his elder brother Sukhi Panesar has also represented Canada in field hockey.

== Club career ==
Panesar played for the UBC Thunderbirds and United Brothers in Canada before moving to England. He joined Beeston HC

== International career ==
Panesar made his national senior team debut in 2014. The same year, he was part of the Canadian team that won the silver medal at the Youth Olympics in Nanjing, China. He captained the Canadian team at the 2016 Men's Hockey Junior World Cup in Lucknow, India. He was part of the national team that clinched silver at the 2017 Men's Pan American Cup in Lancaster, United States. He was selected for the 2018 World Cup, where he played all four games. In June 2019, he was selected in the Canada squad for the 2019 Pan American Games. They won the silver medal as they lost 5–2 to Argentina in the final.
