= Fin Boothroyd =

Canadian field hockey player

Personal information
- Full name: John Findlay Hammond Boothroyd
- Born: March 9, 1999 (age 27) Vancouver, British Columbia, Canada
- Height: 1.81 m (5 ft 11 in)
- Weight: 80 kg (176 lb)

Sport
- Sport: Field hockey
- Position: Forward
- Club: West Vancouver
National team
Years	Team	Caps	Goals
2016	Canada U21	11	(0)
2019–present	Canada	36	(4)
Medal record
Men's field hockey
Representing Canada
Pan American Cup
Bronze medal – third place	2022 Santiago
Pan American Junior Championship
Silver medal – second place	2016 Toronto

John Findlay Hammond Boothroyd (born March 9, 1999) is a Canadian field hockey player who plays in the forward position.

== Career ==
=== Olympics ===
Boothroyd was selected to represent Canada at the 2020 Summer Olympics.
