= Walton Dhaka =

Dhakan professional field hockey team established by the Walton Group

- Short name: WD
- Sport: Field Hockey
- Founded: 2022
- First season: 2022
- Based in: Dhaka
- Stadium: Maulana Bhasani Hockey Stadium
- Owner: Walton Group
- Head coach: Saiful Azli
- Captain: Ashraful Islam
- Main sponsor: Walton Group

Walton Dhaka (Bengali: ওয়ালটন ঢাকা) is a professional field hockey team based in Dhaka. It competes in the Hockey Champions Trophy Bangladesh. It's one of the founding teams of the league. Founded in 2022, the team is owned by Walton Group.

== History ==
Walton Dhaka was formed by Walton Group in 2022. Shafiul Azli became the head coach of the team in inaugural season.

== Current technical staff ==
As of 1 October 2022

Position	Name
Head coach	Saiful Azli

== Roster ==
As of October 2022
Player	Country
Ashraful Islam(C)	(Bangladesh)
S.V. Sunil	(India)
Abu Sayed Nikson	(Bangladesh)
Rakibul Hasan Rocky	(Bangladesh)
Alfandi Ali	(Malaysia)
Abdul Khaliq	(Malaysia)
Saiful Alam Shishir	(Bangladesh)
Mehrav Hossain Samin	(Bangladesh)
Abed Uddin	(Bangladesh)
Azri Hossain	(Malaysia)
Aman Sharif	(Bangladesh)
Al Amin	(Bangladesh)
Ratul Ahmed	(Bangladesh)
Mainul Islam	(Bangladesh)
Mohammed Abdullah	(Bangladesh)
Hozaifa Hossain	(Bangladesh)
Taiyab Ali	(Bangladesh)

== Seasons ==
Year	League Table Standing
2022	6th out of 6
