= Karnaphuli Group =

- Type: Private
- Industry: Conglomerate
- Founded: 1954
- Founder: Hedayat Hossain Chowdhury
- Headquarters: Chittagong, Bangladesh
- Key people: Hamdan Hossain Chowdhury (Group Director).
- Products: Distribution, manufacturing, media, retail, shipping, telecommunications
- Revenue: USD 270 million
- Number of employees: 3238 (2022)
- Website: www.karnaphuli.com

Karnaphuli Group is a Bangladeshi industrial conglomerate. The industries under this conglomerate include port, shipping and logistics, media, health care, real estate, automobiles, finance, and insurance. The managing director of the group is Saber Hossain Chowdhury, former Awami League member of parliament and son of Hedayet Hossain Chowdhury who is also a director of HRC Group, another Bangladeshi conglomerate.

== History ==
Karnaphuli Group was established in 1954 by Hedayet Hossain Chowdhury. The group is named after the Karnaphuli River. Hedayet Hossain Chowdhury's grandson, Hamdan Hossain Chowdhury, is a director of the group.

In 2014, the group signed an agreement to distribute and service Haojue motorcycles of China in Bangladesh. Karnaphuli Group, Metro Group, and Partex Star Group (Partex Group) founded Sky Telecommunication which launched Zelta mobiles in 2015.

Karnaphuli Group is also involved in container shipping and owns 65 vessels. It operates Chittagong to Colombo and Chittagong to Singapore and Port Klang line.

In 2016, the group's partner Hanjin Shipping Lines, a South Korean company, declared bankruptcy in Bangladesh.

== List of companies ==
=== Shipping and logistics ===
- HR Lines Limited
- EasyFly Access Limited
- K&T Logistics Limited

=== Media ===
- Bhorer Kagoj - Daily Bengali newspaper
- Diner Sheshey - evening Bengali newspaper
- The New Paper- English daily newspaper
- Desh TV- Bengali TV channel

=== Healthcare ===
- Sobujmati Sheba

=== Real estate ===
- Karnaphuli Garden City

=== Financials ===
- Republic Insurance Company Limited (RICL)

=== Telecommunication ===
- Voicetel

=== Trading ===
- Karnaphuli Works Limited

== See also ==
- List of companies of Bangladesh
