= Rupayan City Cumilla =

Bangladeshi field hockey team

- Short name: RCC
- Sport: Field Hockey
- Founded: 2022
- First season: 2022
- League: Hockey Champions Trophy
- Based in: Comilla
- Home ground: Maulana Bhasani Hockey Stadium(10,000)
- Owner: Rupayan Group
- Head coach: (South Korea) Kim Young Kyu
- Main sponsor: Rupayan Group

Rupayan City Cumilla (Bengali: রুপায়ন সিটি কুমিল্লা) is a professional franchise field hockey team based in Cumilla, which competes in Hockey Champions Trophy Bangladesh. Founded in 2022, the team is owned by Rupayan Group. It's one of the six founding teams of the league. Kim Young Kyu serves as the team's head coach.

== History ==
Established in 2022 by the Rupayan Group, as one of the founding members of the Hockey Champions Trophy, the team announced that Kim Young Kyu, the former South Korea national team head coach from 2001 till 2004, would serve as their first foreign coach. While former Bangladesh national team captain, Mosiur Rahman Biplob was appointed as the assistant coach.

During the player draft, Rupayan Group Cumilla snapped up national team players Sohanur Rahman Sabuj (icon player), Sarower Hossain and Puskar Khisa Mimo, while also attaining the services of Jasjit Singh Kular, who was part of the Indian team at the 2014 Men's Hockey World Cup.

== Roster ==
As of October 2022.

No.	Player	Position	Country	Note
1	Shohanur Rahman Sobuj		(Bangladesh)	captain
2	Pradeep Mor		(India)	Overseas
3	Sarower Hossain		(Bangladesh)	
4	Puskar Khisa Mimo		(Bangladesh)	
5	Kim Sung Yeob		(South Korea)	Overseas
6	Mohamed Fathur		(Indonesia)	Overseas
7	Milon Hossain		(Bangladesh)	
8	Obaidul Hossain Joy		(Bangladesh)	
9	Ripon Kumar Mondo		(Bangladesh)	
10	Jasjit Singh Kular		(India)	Overseas
11	Shahidur Rahman Saju		(Bangladesh)	
12	Ukkohin Rakhain		(Bangladesh)	
13	Jahid Hossain		(Bangladesh)	
14	Belal Hossain		(Bangladesh)	
15	Shimul Islam		(Bangladesh)	
16	Tanvir Rahman Siam		(Bangladesh)	
17	Mehedi Hasan Limon		(Bangladesh)	
18	Darshan Gawkar		(India)	Overseas

== Personnel ==
=== Current technical staff ===
As of 1 October 2022.

Position	Name
Head coach	(South Korea) Kim Young Kyu
Assistant Coach	(Bangladesh) Mosiur Rahman Biplob

== Seasons ==
Year	League Table Standing	Final Standing
2022	2nd out of 6	3rd
