= Field hockey at the 2014 Summer Youth Olympics – Boys' tournament =

2014 Summer Youth Olympics
Tournament details
- Host country: China
- City: Nanjing
- Dates: 17–27 August
- Teams: 10
- Venue: Youth Olympic Sports Park

Final positions
- Champions: Australia (2nd title)
- Runner-up: Canada
- Third place: Spain

Tournament statistics
- Matches played: 33
- Goals scored: 285 (8.64 per match)
- Top scorer: (Spain) Enrique González (10 goals)

The boys' tournament at the 2014 Summer Youth Olympics was held at the Youth Olympic Sports Park from 17–27 August 2014. Australia won the gold medal after defeating Canada in the final.

== Results ==
All times are China Standard Time (UTC+08:00)

=== Preliminary round ===
==== Pool A ====
Pos	Team	Pld	W	D	L	GF	GA	GD	Pts	Qualification
1	Spain	4	4	0	0	28	10	+18	12	Quarterfinals
2	Australia	4	2	0	2	21	17	+4	6	Quarterfinals
3	Canada	4	2	0	2	14	13	+1	6	Quarterfinals
4	South Africa	4	2	0	2	11	19	−8	6	Quarterfinals
5	Bangladesh	4	0	0	4	7	22	−15	0	

Source: FIH
Rules for classification: 1) points; 2) goal difference; 3) goals scored; 4) head-to-head result.

17 August 2014
16:00

Spain	9–1	Bangladesh
Suárez 2', 11', 35'; Fortuny 5'; González 6', 14'; Alcalde 8'; Fábregas 23', 24'	Report	Babu 36'

Umpires:
Rawi Anbananthan (MAS)
Epeli Tukuca (FIJ)

17 August 2014
19:00

South Africa	1–5	Canada
Ntuli 3'	Report	Panesar 7', 10'; Pereira 29'; A. Sidhu 31'; Sandhu 36'

Umpires:
Paul Walker (GBR)
Scott Embry (AUS)

18 August 2014
16:30

Australia	5–2	Bangladesh
Warne 11', 18', 30', 31'; Rasmussen 21'	Report	Emon 21'; Uddin 26'

Umpires:
Sherif Elamari (EGY)
Sompop Boonsong (THA)

18 August 2014
19:30

Spain	6–3	Canada
Fortuny 5', 33'; González 10', 26'; Palet 30', 36'	Report	Sandhu 12', 30'; Panesar 36'

Umpires:
Oliver Tarnoczi (AUT)
Duvaughn Henlon (JAM)

19 August 2014
16:00

South Africa	6–5	Australia
Schooling 24', 34'; Kok 27', 30'; Crowe 27', 29'	Report	Weyer 2', 17'; Rasmussen 4'; Warne 7', 9'

Umpires:
Donovan Simmons (BER)
Epeli Tukuca (FIJ)

19 August 2014
19:00

Canada	4–1	Bangladesh
Pereira 6'; A. Sidhu 29'; Panesar 34'; Muldoon 35'	Report	Uddin 36'

Umpires:
Rawi Anbananthan (MAS)
Sherif Elamari (EGY)

20 August 2014
17:30

Spain	7–6	Australia
Fábregas 5'; González 16', 31'; Rosell 19'; Grau 21'; Palet 22'; Alcalde 26'	Report	Stewart 1'; Bird 3'; Weyer 4', 36'; Hendry 13'; Bretherton 29'

Umpires:
Rawi Anbananthan (MAS)
Duvaughn Henlon (JAM)

20 August 2014
19:30

Bangladesh	3–4	South Africa
Uddin 14'; Rabby 18'; Emon 28'	Report	Dlungwana 7'; Ntuli 18', 22', 31'

Umpires:
Sompop Boonsong (THA)
Donovan Simmons (BER)

21 August 2014
16:30

Australia	5–2	Canada
Bird 2'; Stewart 10'; Bretherton 25'; Weyer 29'; Wayne 35'	Report	A. Sidhu 13'; H. Sidhu 36'

Umpires:
Paul Walker (GBR)
Oliver Tarnoczi (AUT)

21 August 2014
19:30

South Africa	0–6	Spain
	Report	González 3', 30'; Rossell 7', 18'; Fortuny 17', 24'

Umpires:
Aziz Adimah (GHA)
Sherif Elamari (EGY)

==== Pool B ====
Pos	Team	Pld	W	D	L	GF	GA	GD	Pts	Qualification
1	New Zealand	4	3	1	0	28	12	+16	10	Quarterfinals
2	Pakistan	4	3	1	0	27	12	+15	10	Quarterfinals
3	Mexico	4	1	0	3	11	20	−9	3	Quarterfinals
4	Zambia	4	1	0	3	14	24	−10	3	Quarterfinals
5	Germany	4	1	0	3	10	22	−12	3	

Source: FIH
Rules for classification: 1) points; 2) goal difference; 3) goals scored; 4) head-to-head result.

17 August 2014
18:00

New Zealand	8–2	Zambia
Phillips 5', 10', 36'; Capizzi 8'; Brydon 14'; Sarikaya 24'; Newman 26', 33'	Report	Lowole 12'; Bwalya 19'

Umpires:
Sompop Boonsong (THA)
Oliver Tarnoczi (AUT)

17 August 2014
21:00

Pakistan	6–2	Mexico
Atiq 3'; Ali 6'; Irshad 8', 26'; Yaqoob 30'; Mahmood 34'	Report	Jacobo 23'; Gomez 35'

Umpires:
Sherif Elamari (EGY)
Donovan Simmons (BER)

18 August 2014
17:30

Germany	1–8	Zambia
Grossmann 36'	Report	Mpande 1', 5', 34', 36'; Tembo 18', 28'; Lowole 31', 32'

Umpires:
Epeli Tukuca (FIJ)
Paul Walker (GBR)

18 August 2014
21:00

New Zealand	8–1	Mexico
Newman 3'; Lum 9', 17'; Brydon 11', 21'; Wilcox 12', 29'; Phillips 23'	Report	Martinez 26'

Umpires:
Aziz Adimah (GHA)
Scott Embry (AUS)

19 August 2014
18:00

Pakistan	6–2	Germany
Atiq 6'; Ali 8', 29'; Irshad 12'; Mahmood 16'; Malik 18'	Report	Schneider 9'; Grossmann 21'

Umpires:
Paul Walker (GBR)
Aziz Adimah (GHA)

19 August 2014
21:00

Mexico	6–2	Zambia
Salas 7', 8', 11'; Gomez 18'; Falcon 31'; Martinez 34'	Report	Lowole 5'; Mpande 35'

Umpires:
Scott Embry (AUS)
Duvaughn Henlon (JAM)

20 August 2014
16:30

New Zealand	6–3	Germany
Capizzi 10'; Brydon 13'; Thomas 20'; Newman 23'; Phillips 33', 35'	Report	Schneider 17', 29'; Korber 19'

Umpires:
Scott Embry (AUS)
Oliver Tarnoczi (AUT)

20 August 2014
20:30

Zambia	2–9	Pakistan
Lowole 5'; Mpande 8'	Report	Malid 2', 5', 23'; Kamal 12'; Atiq 13', 30', 36'; Mahmood 17'; Ali 22'

Umpires:
Aziz Adimah (GHA)
Epeli Tukuca (FIJ)

21 August 2014
16:00

Germany	4–2	Mexico
Schneider 9', 21'; Grossmann 28'; Korber 35'	Report	Moreno 12'; Gomez 36'

Umpires:
Rawi Anbananthan (MAS)
Sompop Boonsong (THA)

21 August 2014
19:00

Pakistan	6–6	New Zealand
Atiq 15', 27'; Irshad 18', 30'; Ali 29'; Kamal 31'	Report	Brydon 2'; Sarikaya 7'; Capizzi 12'; Newman 13'; Thomas 14', 22'

Umpires:
Donovan Simmons (BER)
Duvaughn Henlon (JAM)

=== Second round ===
Quarterfinals
23 August 2014
Spain	10
Zambia	1
23 August 2014
Pakistan	7 (2)
Canada (p.s.o)	7 (3)
23 August 2014
New Zealand	0
South Africa	3
23 August 2014
Australia	8
Mexico	1

Semi-finals
25 August 2014
Spain	4 (5)
Canada (p.s.o)	4 (6)
25 August 2014
South Africa	3
Australia	4

Final
27 August 2014
Canada	3 (2)
Australia (p.s.o)	3 (3)
Third place match
27 August 2014
Spain	7
South Africa	4

==== Quarterfinals ====
23 August 2014
19:00

Spain	10–1	Zambia
Suárez 3', 20'; Rosell 4', 29'; Fábregas 7'; Grau 19'; Fortuny 21', 30'; González 34'; Alcalde 36'	Report	Tagwireyi 26'

Umpires:
Epeli Tukuca (FIJ)
Scott Embry (AUS)

23 August 2014
19:30

Pakistan	7–7	Canada
Mahmood 10'; Atiq 23', 36'; Irshad 23'; Malik 25', 34'; Ali 32'	Report	A. Sidhu 4', 13'; Sandhu 6'; Pereira 16', 22'; H. Sidhu 30', 35'
Penalties
Irshad (penalty shoot-out missed); Atiq (penalty shoot-out scored); Mahmood (penalty shoot-out scored) —— Atiq (penalty shoot-out missed); Irshad (penalty shoot-out missed)	2–3	(penalty shoot-out missed) A. Sidhu; (penalty shoot-out scored) Panesar; (penalty shoot-out scored) Sandhu —— (penalty shoot-out missed) Panesar; (penalty shoot-out scored) Sandhu

Umpires:
Paul Walker (GBR)
Rawi Anbananthan (MAS)

23 August 2014
20:30

Australia	8–1	Mexico
Bird 12', 17'; Weyer 15', 36'; Rasmussen 20', 28', 30'; Warne 26'	Report	Martinez 35'

Umpires:
Donovan Simmons (BER)
Oliver Tarnoczi (AUT)

23 August 2014
21:00

New Zealand	0–3	South Africa
	Report	Ntuli 4', 18', 26'

Umpires:
Aziz Adimah (GHA)
Duvaughn Henlon (JAM)

==== Ninth and tenth place ====
25 August 2014
16:00

Bangladesh	4–5	Germany
Uddin 15'; Babu 16', 36'; Emon 20'	Report	Wenzel 3'; Lampe 12'; Strzys 21', 23'; Schneider 35'

Umpires:
Scott Embry (AUS)
Aziz Adimah (GHA)

==== Fifth to eighth place classification ====
Crossover
25 August 2014
Zambia	2
Pakistan	5
25 August 2014
New Zealand	9
Mexico	2

Fifth place match
27 August 2014
Pakistan	4
New Zealand	3
Seventh place match
27 August 2014
Zambia	7
Mexico	4

==== Crossover ====
25 August 2014
16:30

Zambia	2–5	Pakistan
Bwalya 10'; Lowole 22'	Report	Malik 13'; Ali 23'; Yaqoob 26'; Irshad 29'; Mahmood 33'

Umpires:
Sherif Elamari (EGY)
Sompop Boonsong (THA)

25 August 2014
17:30

New Zealand	9–2	Mexico
Thomas 3', 15', 20', 24'; Lum 6', 7', 12', 29'; Capizzi 16'	Report	Falcon 8'; Martinez 17'

Umpires:
Paul Walker (GBR)
Epeli Tukuca (FIJ)

==== Seventh and eighth place ====
27 August 2014
16:00

Zambia	7–4	Mexico
Mpande 4', 30'; Mwansa 11'; Katele 18'; Lowole 23', 24', 36'	Report	Diaz 12', 24'; Martinez 28'; Falcon 36'

Umpires:
Oliver Tarnoczi (AUT)
Scott Embry (AUS)

==== Fifth and sixth place ====
27 August 2014
17:30

Pakistan	4–3	New Zealand
Ali 14'; Yaqoob 15'; Irshad 22', 27'	Report	Capizzi 8'; Wilcox 18'; Newman 19'

Umpires:
Duvaughn Henlon (JAM)
Sherif Elamari (EGY)

==== Semifinals ====
25 August 2014
18:00

Spain	4–4	Canada
Fábregas 2'; Palet 4'; González 13'; Alcalde 30'	Report	A. Sidhu 7', 31'; Sandhu 24'; Panesar 36'
Penalties
Fábregas (penalty shoot-out missed); González (penalty shoot-out scored); Suárez (penalty shoot-out scored) —— González (penalty shoot-out scored); Suárez (penalty shoot-out scored); Fábregas (penalty shoot-out scored); González (penalty shoot-out missed)	5–6	(penalty shoot-out scored) A. Sidhu; (penalty shoot-out missed) Panesar; (penalty shoot-out scored) Sandhu —— (penalty shoot-out scored) A. Sidhu; (penalty shoot-out scored) Panesar; (penalty shoot-out scored) Sandhu; (penalty shoot-out scored) A. Sidhu

Umpires:
Donovan Simmons (BER)
Oliver Tarnoczi (AUT)

25 August 2014
19:30

South Africa	3–4	Australia
Crowe 12'; Turner 28'; Schooling 36'	Report	Stewart 18'; Howard 21', 34'; Weyer 31'

Umpires:
Rawi Anbananthan (MAS)
Duvaughn Henlon (JAM)

==== Bronze medal match ====
27 August 2014
19:00

(bronze) Spain	7–4	South Africa
Palet 7', 15'; Suárez 9'; Alcalde 19'; Rosell 20'; Fábregas 34'; Fortuny 36'	Report	Kok 18', 23'; Ntuli 24'; Bleeker 34'

Umpires:
Rawi Anbananthan (MAS)
Donovan Simmons (BER)

==== Gold medal match ====
27 August 2014
20:30

(silver) Canada	3–3	Australia (gold)
Sandhu 19'; A. Sidhu 34', 36'	Report	Rasmussen 3', 32'; Hendry 21'
Penalties
A. Sidhu (penalty shoot-out scored); Panesar (penalty shoot-out scored); Sandhu (penalty shoot-out missed)	2–3	(penalty shoot-out scored) Bird; (penalty shoot-out scored) Rasmussen; (penalty shoot-out scored) Weyer

Umpires:
Paul Walker (GBR)
Aziz Adimah (GHA)

== Final ranking ==
As per statistical convention in field hockey, matches decided in regular time are counted as wins and losses, while matches decided by penalty shoot-outs are counted as draws.

Pos	Team	Pld	W	D	L	GF	GA	GD	Pts	Final result
1st place, gold medalist(s)	Australia	7	4	1	2	36	24	+12	13	Gold Medal
2nd place, silver medalist(s)	Canada	7	2	3	2	28	27	+1	9	Silver Medal
3rd place, bronze medalist(s)	Spain	7	6	1	0	49	17	+32	19	Bronze Medal
4	South Africa	7	3	0	4	21	30	−9	9	Fourth place
5	Pakistan	7	5	2	0	43	24	+19	17	Eliminated in quarter-finals
6	New Zealand	7	4	1	2	40	21	+19	13	Eliminated in quarter-finals
7	Zambia	7	2	0	5	24	43	−19	6	Eliminated in quarter-finals
8	Mexico	7	1	0	6	18	44	−26	3	Eliminated in quarter-finals
9	Germany	5	2	0	3	15	26	−11	6	Eliminated in group stage
10	Bangladesh	5	1	0	4	11	27	−16	3	Eliminated in group stage

Source: Rio2016

== Goalscorers ==
There have been 277 goals scored in 33 matches, for an average of 8.39 goals per match.

9 goals

- (Pakistan) Muhammad Atiq

8 goals

- (Spain) Enrique González
- (Pakistan) Shan Irshad
- (Australia) Mackenzie Warne
- (Australia) Corey Weyer
- (Pakistan) Mubashar Ali
- (Spain) Joan Tarres
- (Zambia) Blessings Lowole
- (Zambia) Alfred Mpande

7 goals

- (Canada) Vikramjeet Sandhu
- (New Zealand) Dylan Thomas
- (Pakistan) Nohaiz Malik

6 goals

- (Canada) Arshjit Sidhu
- (Australia) Alec Rasmussen
- (New Zealand) Richmond Lum
- (New Zealand) Dominic Newman
- (New Zealand) Hayden Phillips
- (South Africa) Nqobile Ntuli
- (Spain) Maunel Bordas
- (Spain) Jordi Farres Palet
- (Spain) Jan Lara
- (Spain) Pol Parrilla

5 goals

- (Germany) Felix Schneider
- (Canada) Balraj Panesar
- (Mexico) Daniel Rangel
- (New Zealand) David Brydon
- (New Zealand) Robbie Capizzi
- (Pakistan) Muhammad Mahmood
- (Spain) Lucas Garcia Alcalde

4 goals

- (Australia) Matthew Bird
- (Bangladesh) Naim Uddin
- (South Africa) Tevin Kok

3 goals

- (Australia) Nathanael Stewart
- (Bangladesh) Rezaul Babu
- (Bangladesh) Md Deen Islam Emon
- (Canada) Brandon Pereira
- (Canada) Harbir Sidhu
- (Germany) Luca Grossmann
- (Mexico) Irvin Chavez
- (Mexico) Alex Valdez
- (Mexico) Alejandro Mendez
- (New Zealand) Mackenzie Wilcox
- (Pakistan) Muhammad Yaqoob
- (South Africa) Ryan Crowe
- (South Africa) Luke Schooling
- (Zambia) Gift Bwalya

2 goals

- (Australia) Jonathan Bretherton
- (Australia) Max Hendry
- (Australia) Tim Howard
- (Germany) Anton Korber
- (Germany) Philip Strzys
- (Mexico) Reymundo Lemus
- (New Zealand) Aidan Sarikaya
- (South Africa) Jacques Bleeker
- (South Africa) Tyson Dlungwana
- (Pakistan) Muhammad Kamal
- (Spain) Llorenç Piera
- (Zambia) Samson Tembo

1 goal

- (Bangladesh) Fazla Rabby
- (Canada) Braedon Muldoon
- (Germany) Lucas Lampe
- (Germany) Simon Wenzel
- (Mexico) Jose Montano
- (Mexico) Miguel Othon
- (South Africa) Garth Turner
- (Zambia) Shadrick Katele
- (Zambia) Victor Mwansa
- (Zambia) Samuel Tagwireyi

Source: FIH
