= Monarch Padma =

Bangladeshi field hockey team

- Full name: Monarch Mart Padma
- Nickname: Monarchies
- Short name: MP
- Sport: Field Hockey
- Founded: 2022
- First season: 2022
- League: Hockey Champions Trophy Bangladesh
- Based in: Faridpur
- Home ground: Maulana Bhasani Hockey Stadium (10,000)
- Owner: Shakib Al Hasan
- Head coach: (South Korea) Yu Seung-jin
- Captain: Imran Hasan Pintu
- Main sponsor: Monarch Mart

Monarch Padma (Bengali: মনার্ক পদ্মা) is a professional franchise field hockey team based in Faridpur, representing the Padma Division. It participates in the Hockey Champions Trophy Bangladesh. Founded in 2022, the team is owned by Shakib Al Hasan. They are one of the six founding members of the country's first ever franchise hockey league. Yu Seung-jin is the current head coach of the team.

== History ==
On 5 September 2022, cricketer Shakib Al Hasan, bought the Faridpur based club, through his company Monarch Mart. Before the league season started, the club announced former South Korean international Yu Seung-jin as the head coach. Ex-Bangladesh national hockey team player, Shahidullah Titu was appointed as the assistant coach.

== Roster ==
As of October 2022.

No.	Player	Position	Country	Note
1	Imran Hasan Pintu		(Bangladesh)	Captain
2	Chinglensana Singh	Halfback	(India)	Overseas
3	Russel Mahmood Jimmy		(Bangladesh)	
4	Nayeem Uddin		(Bangladesh)	
5	Saif Khan		(India)	Overseas
6	Woohyeong Seo		(South Korea)	Overseas
7	Al Nahiyan Shuvo		(Bangladesh)	
8	Khaled Mahmud Rakin		(Bangladesh)	
9	Azim Uddin		(Bangladesh)	
10	Miyu Tanimitsu		(Japan)	Overseas
11	Ashraful Islam Saad		(Bangladesh)	
12	Ramim Hossain		(Bangladesh)	
13	Ashik Mahmud Sagor		(Bangladesh)	
14	Krishna Kumar Das		(Bangladesh)	
15	Rahit Hossain		(Bangladesh)	
16	Raiful Islam		(Bangladesh)	
17	Rakibul Hasan		(Bangladesh)	
18	Kieran Ian Govers		(Australia)	Overseas

== Personnel ==
=== Current technical staff ===
As of 1 October 2022

Role	Name
Head coach	(South Korea) Yu Seung-jin
Assistant coach	(Bangladesh) Shahidullah Titu
Mentor	(Pakistan) Shahbaz Ahmed

== Seasons ==
Year	League Table Standing	Final Standing
2022	4th out of 6	Runners-up
