= Maulana Bhasani Hockey Stadium =

Hockey Stadium in Bangladesh

Coordinates: 23.7259°N 90.4124°E

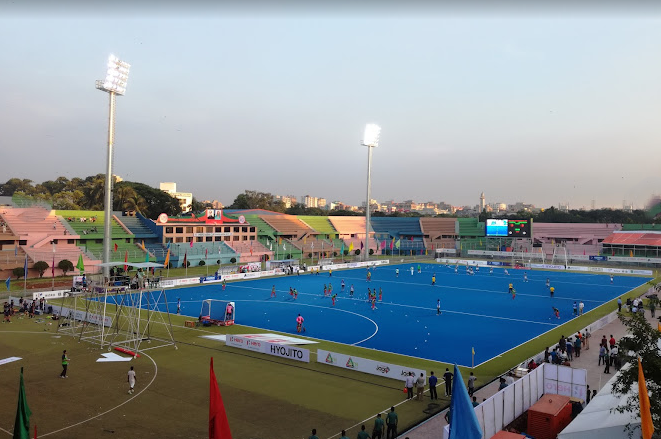
- Interactive map of Maulana Bhasani Hockey Stadium
- Address: Dhaka; Bangladesh
- Location: Dhaka
- Owner: Bangladesh Hockey Federation
- Capacity: 10,000
- Field size: 100 x 64 m

Tenants
- Bangladesh Hockey Team Hockey Champions Trophy Bangladesh teams (2022–Present) Monarch Mart Padma, Rupayan Group Cumilla, Metro Express Barishal, Saif Powertec Khulna, Walton Dhaka, Acme Chattogram

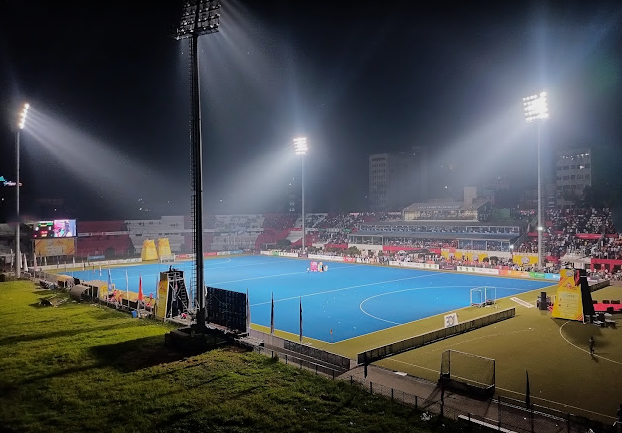
The Stadium

Maulana Bhasani Hockey Stadium is a field hockey stadium located in Dhaka, Bangladesh. It is the first hockey stadium in Bangladesh and also the headquarters of Bangladesh Hockey Federation.
