= Corey Weyer =

Australian field hockey player

Personal information
- Born: 28 March 1996 (age 30) Gold Coast, Queensland, Australia

Sport
- Sport: Field hockey
- Position: Defender
- Club: QLD Blades
National team
Years	Team	Caps	Goals
2014	Australia U18	11	-
2016	Australia U21	11	-
2017–	Australia	63	(3)
Medal record
Representing Australia
Men's field hockey
World Cup
Bronze medal – third place	2018 Bhubaneswar	Team
Oceania Cup
Gold medal – first place	2019 Rockhampton	Team
Gold medal – first place	2025 Darwin
Men's hockey5s
Youth Olympic Games
Gold medal – first place	2014 Nanjing	Team

Corey Weyer (born 28 March 1996) is an Australian field hockey player who plays as a defender for the Australian national team.

== Career ==
=== Junior National Teams ===
Weyer has represented Australia at junior level in both Under 18 and Under 21 age groups.

In 2014, Weyer was a member of the Australia Under 18 side at the 2014 Youth Olympic Games in Nanjing, China. The team won the gold medal, defeating Canada 3–2 in a penalty shoot-out following a 3–3 draw.

Weyer made his debut for the Australian Under 21 side, 'The Burras', at the 2016 edition of the Sultan of Johor Cup, winning a gold medal.

In 2016, Weyer also a member of the team at the Junior World Cup in Lucknow, India, where the team finished fourth.

=== Senior National Team ===
In 2017, Weyer made his senior international debut for the Kookaburras at the 2017 International Festival of Hockey.

In November 2018, Weyer was named in the squad for the Hockey World Cup in Bhubaneswar, India.

Weyer was selected for the Kookaburras squad for the 2024 Summer Olympics in Paris, scoring the opening goal in Australia's 2–1 win over Ireland in the group stage. Coach Colin Batch was quoted before the Olympics that Weyer "was the best story in the team" after the defender got himself fitter and followed up with an impressive campaign playing for the Brisbane Blaze during the 2023 Hockey One season.
