= Asim Gope =

Bangladeshi field hockey player

Personal information
- Full name: Asim Gope
- Born: 25/12/1994 Habiganj District, Sylhet, Bangladesh

Sport
- Sport: Field hockey
Senior career
Years	Team	Caps	Goals
2022	Metro Express Barishal	-	-
National team
Years	Team	Caps	Goals
–	Bangladesh		-

Asim Gope (Bengali: অসীম গোপ) is a Bangladeshi field hockey player who plays as a goalkeeper. He is a member of the Bangladesh national field hockey team.
