= Jamie Wallace =

Canadian field hockey player

Personal information
- Full name: James Brodie Burns Wallace
- Born: 14 September 1999 (age 26) Vancouver, British Columbia
- Height: 1.95 m (6 ft 5 in)

Sport
- Sport: Field hockey
- Position: Midfielder / Forward
- Club: Almere
Senior career
Years	Team	Caps	Goals
–2020	UBC Thunderbirds	-	-
2020–present	Almere	-	-
National team
Years	Team	Caps	Goals
2016	Canada U21	11	-
2018–present	Canada	46	(13)
Medal record
Men's field hockey
Representing Canada
Pan American Games
Silver medal – second place	2019 Lima	Team
Pan American Junior Championship
Silver medal – second place	2016 Toronto
- Updated on 24 July 2021

James Brodie Burns Wallace (born September 14, 1999) is a Canadian field hockey player who plays as a midfielder or forward for Dutch club Almere and the Canadian national team.

== Club career ==
Wallace joined Almere in the Dutch Hoofdklasse for the 2020–21 season. He has also played for the UBC Thunderbirds in Canada.

== International career ==
Wallace won a silver medal with the Canada national under-21 team at the 2016 Pan American Junior Championship. He represented Canada at the 2018 World Cup, where he played all four games. In June 2019, he was selected in the Canada squad for the 2019 Pan American Games. They won the silver medal as they lost 5–2 to Argentina in the final.

In June 2021, Wallace was named to Canada's 2020 Summer Olympics team.
