= Jasjit Singh Kular =

Indian field hockey player (born 1989)

Personal information
- Born: 30 December 1989 (age 36) Sansarpur, Punjab, India

Sport
- Sport: Field hockey
- Position: Forward
Senior career
Years	Team	Caps	Goals
2022	Rupayan Group Cumilla	-	-
National team
Years	Team	Caps	Goals
–	India		-
Medal record
Men's field hockey
Representing India
Asian Champions Trophy
Gold medal – first place	2016 Kuantan
Hockey World League
Bronze medal – third place	2014–15 Raipur	Team
- Updated on 8 July 2016

Jasjit Singh Kular (born 30 December 1989) is an Indian field hockey player who plays as a forward. He was part of the Indian team that competed at the 2014 Men's Hockey World Cup.
