= Devindar Walmiki =

Indian field hockey player (born 1992)

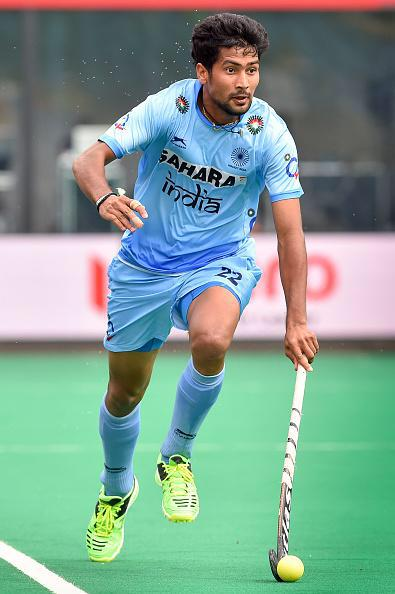

Personal information
- Full name: Devindar Sunil Walmiki
- Born: 28 May 1992 (age 34) Mumbai, Maharashtra, India

Sport
- Sport: Field hockey
- Position: Midfielder
Senior career
Years	Team	Caps	Goals
2019–2021	HGC	-	-
2022	Acme Chattogram	18	11
2022	Mohun Bagan	-	-
National team
Years	Team	Caps	Goals
2014–	India	43	-
Medal record
Men's field hockey
Representing India
Champions Trophy
Silver medal – second place	2016 London
Hockey World League
Bronze medal – third place	2014–15 Raipur	Team
Asian Champions Trophy
Gold medal – first place	2016 Kuantan
- Updated on 10 August 2019

Devindar Sunil Walmiki (born 28 May 1992) is an Indian field hockey player who plays as a midfielder.

He was named in the Indian squad for the 2016 Summer Olympics.

Walmiki's elder brother Yuvraj Walmiki has also played field hockey for India.

== Club career ==
In July 2019 Devindar signed for Dutch club HGC in the Hoofdklasse.

In 2022, Devinder played for Acme Chattogram in the Hockey Champions Trophy Bangladesh and became champions.
