= Llorenç Piera =

Spanish field hockey player (born 1996)

Personal information
- Full name: Llorenç Piera Grau
- Born: 4 November 1996 (age 29) Barcelona, Spain
- Height: 1.86 m (6 ft 1 in)
- Weight: 74 kg (163 lb)

Sport
- Sport: Field hockey
- Position: Defender
Senior career
Years	Team	Caps	Goals
–2024	Real Club de Polo	-	-
National team
Years	Team	Caps	Goals
2016–2017	Spain U21	15	(2)
2017–2022	Spain	63	(0)
Medal record
Representing Spain
Men's field hockey
EuroHockey Championship
Silver medal – second place	2019 Antwerp
Men's hockey5s
Youth Olympic Games
Bronze medal – third place	2014 Nanjing	Team

Llorenç Piera Grau (born 4 November 1996) is a Spanish former field hockey player who played as a defender for Real Club de Polo and the Spanish national team.

He retired after the 2023–24 season.

== International career ==
At the 2019 EuroHockey Championship, Piera won his first medal with the senior national team as they finished second. On 25 May 2021, he was selected in the squad for the 2021 EuroHockey Championship. He competed in the 2020 Summer Olympics.
