= Taylor Curran (field hockey) =

Canadian field hockey player

Personal information
- Full name: Taylor Westermark Curran
- Born: May 19, 1992 (age 34) Vancouver, British Columbia, Canada
- Height: 1.83 m (6 ft 0 in)
- Weight: 80 kg (176 lb)

Sport
- Sport: Field hockey
- Position: Defender / Midfielder
- Club: West Vancouver
Senior career
Years	Team	Caps	Goals
–	West Vancouver	-	-
National team
Years	Team	Caps	Goals
2009–present	Canada	185	(7)
Medal record
Men's field hockey
Representing Canada
Pan American Games
Silver medal – second place	2015 Toronto	Team
Silver medal – second place	2019 Lima	Team
Pan American Cup
Silver medal – second place	2013 Brampton
Silver medal – second place	2017 Lancaster
Bronze medal – third place	2022 Santiago
Pan American Junior Championship
Silver medal – second place	2012 Guadalajara
- Updated on 24 July 2021

Taylor Westermark Curran (born May 19, 1992) is a Canadian field hockey player who plays as a defender or midfielder for West Vancouver and the Canadian national team.

== International career ==
Curran made his debut for the national team in 2009 and he played in the 2010 World Cup. He played for the Canada national field hockey team at the 2015 Pan American Games and won a silver medal. In 2016, he was named to Canada's Olympic team. He was named as a reserve for the 2018 World Cup. In June 2019, he was selected in the Canada squad for the 2019 Pan American Games. They won the silver medal as they lost 5–2 to Argentina in the final.
