= 2016 Men's Pan-Am Junior Championship =

Field hockey tournament

2016 Men's Junior Pan-Am Championship

Tournament details
- Host country: Canada
- City: Toronto
- Dates: 20–28 May
- Teams: 8 (from 1 confederation)
- Venue: Back Campus Fields

Final positions
- Champions: Argentina (11th title)
- Runner-up: Canada
- Third place: Chile

Tournament statistics
- Matches played: 24
- Goals scored: 185 (7.71 per match)
- Top scorer: (Argentina) Maico Casella (18 goals)
- Best player: (Argentina) Maico Casella
- Best goalkeeper: (Trinidad and Tobago) Kwasi Emmanuel

The 2016 Men's Junior Pan-Am Championship was the 11th edition of the Men's Pan American Junior Championship. It was held from 20 to 28 May 2016 in Toronto, Canada.

The tournament served as a qualifier for the 2016 Men's Hockey Junior World Cup, held in Lucknow, India in December 2016.

Argentina won the tournament for the 11th time, defeating Canada 5–0 in the final. Chile won the bronze medal by defeating United States 4–1 in the third and fourth place playoff.

== Participating nations ==
Alongside the host nation, 7 teams competed in the tournament.

- Argentina
- Canada
- Chile
- Guyana
- Mexico
- Puerto Rico
- Trinidad and Tobago
- United States

== Preliminary round ==
=== Pool A ===
| Pos | Team | Pld | W | D | L | GF | GA | GD | Pts |
|---|---|---|---|---|---|---|---|---|---|
| 1 | Argentina | 3 | 3 | 0 | 0 | 35 | 0 | +35 | 9 |
| 2 | Trinidad and Tobago | 3 | 2 | 0 | 1 | 19 | 6 | +13 | 6 |
| 3 | United States | 3 | 1 | 0 | 2 | 9 | 14 | −5 | 3 |
| 4 | Puerto Rico | 3 | 0 | 0 | 3 | 0 | 43 | −43 | 0 |

Source: FIH

20 May 2016
10:00

| Argentina | 5–0 | Trinidad and Tobago |
|---|---|---|
| Domene 23', 48'; Gencarelli 30'; Rios 34'; Ferreiro 49' | Report |

Umpires:
Ben de Young (AUS)
Tyler Klenk (CAN)

20 May 2016
12:30

| United States | 8–0 | Puerto Rico |
|---|---|---|
| Kentwell 7'; Cicchi 21', 33', 35+', 45', 8', 70'; McGuigan 70' | Report |

Umpires:
Matias Barbosa (CHL)
Michael Harding (GUY)

21 May 2016
10:00

| Trinidad and Tobago | 14–0 | Puerto Rico |
|---|---|---|
| Te. Marcano 1', 43'; Francis 10', 58'; Kr. Emmanuel 10', 40', 62', 65'; Paul 16'; Reynos 20'; Ki. Emmanuel 24'; Pascal 27'; Wren 42'; Modeste 59' | Report |

Umpires:
Jonathan Altamirano (MEX)
Michael Harding (GUY)

21 May 2016
12:30

| United States | 0–9 | Argentina |
|---|---|---|
| | Report | Ferreiro 6', 56'; Domene 31', 43', 70'; Casella 39', 42', 61'; Tarazona 70' |

Umpires:
Paul Walker (ENG)
Tyler Klenk (CAN)

23 May 2016
10:00

| Argentina | 21–0 | Puerto Rico |
|---|---|---|
| Ferreiro 4', 21', 66'; Casella 7', 9', 33', 34'; Nepote 14', 61'; Moreschi 15', 54', 58'; Keenan 17'; Domene 18', 21', 50', 51'; Gencarelli 19'; Acosta 23', 25', 63' | Report |

Umpires:
Matias Barbosa (CHL)
Jonathan Altamirano (MEX)

23 May 2016
12:30

| Trinidad and Tobago | 5–1 | United States |
|---|---|---|
| Marcano 6'; Ta. Marcano 31', 63'; Vieira 43'; Paul 48' | Report | Kentwell 38' |

Umpires:
Ben de Young (AUS)
Tyler Klenk (CAN)

=== Pool B ===
| Pos | Team | Pld | W | D | L | GF | GA | GD | Pts |
|---|---|---|---|---|---|---|---|---|---|
| 1 | Chile | 3 | 3 | 0 | 0 | 12 | 4 | +8 | 9 |
| 2 | Mexico | 3 | 2 | 0 | 1 | 12 | 6 | +6 | 6 |
| 3 | Canada (H) | 3 | 1 | 0 | 2 | 11 | 5 | +6 | 3 |
| 4 | Guyana | 3 | 0 | 0 | 3 | 2 | 22 | −20 | 0 |

Source: FIH
(H) Hosts

20 May 2016
15:00

| Chile | 7–1 | Guyana |
|---|---|---|
| Becerra 20'; Amoroso 33', 44'; Strabucchi 46'; N. Renz 60', 63'; Hurtado 67' | Report | Branford 58' |

Umpires:
Federico Silva (ARG)
Kevin George (TTO)

20 May 2016
17:30

| Canada | 2–3 | Mexico |
|---|---|---|
| Pereira 51'; Sidhu 70' | Report | Arballo 44'; M. Méndez 59'; Lemus 69' |

Umpires:
Paul Walker (ENG)
Benjamin Peters (USA)

21 May 2016
15:00

| Mexico | 7–1 | Guyana |
|---|---|---|
| Lemus 17'; Y. Méndez 23'; Chávez 36', 55'; Rangel 59'; Villegas 67'; Arballo 70' | Report | Branford 10' |

Umpires:
Hugo Romero Chamorro (PAR)
Kevin George (TTO)

21 May 2016
17:30

| Chile | 2–1 | Canada |
|---|---|---|
| Bravo 64'; Hurtado 68' | Report | Aujla 41' |

Umpires:
Ben de Young (AUS)
Federico Silva (ARG)

23 May 2016
15:00

| Mexico | 2–3 | Chile |
|---|---|---|
| Lemus 8'; M. Méndez 61' | Report | Gesswein 41'; Troncoso 51'; N. Renz 55' |

Umpires:
Paul Walker (ENG)
Federica Silva (ARG)

23 May 2016
17:30

| Guyana | 0–8 | Canada |
|---|---|---|
| | Report | Pereira 13', 50'; Gill 15'; Sidhu 18'; Aujla 33', 60'; Dhaliwal 47'; Harris 68' |

Umpires:
Benjamin Peters (USA)
Hugo Romero Chamorro (PAR)

== Classification round ==
=== Bracket ===
Quarter-finals
25 May
Argentina | 12
Guyana | 0
25 May
Mexico | 2
United States | 3
25 May
Trinidad and Tobago | 2
Canada | 3
25 May
Chile | 11
Puerto Rico | 0

Semi-finals
27 May
Argentina | 10
United States | 0
27 May
Canada | 3
Chile | 1

Final
28 May
Argentina | 5
Canada | 0
Third place
28 May
United States | 1
Chile | 4

=== Quarter-finals ===
25 May 2016
11:00

| Argentina | 12–0 | Guyana |
|---|---|---|
| Acosta 3', 61'; Casella 7', 32', 57', 63'; Domene 10', 13', 45'; Moreschi 11', 48'; Ferreiro 41' | Report |

Umpires:
Kevin George (TTO)
Jonathan Altamirano (MEX)

25 May 2016
13:15

| Mexico | 2–3 | United States |
|---|---|---|
| Rangel 2'; Chávez 22' | Report | McGuigan 33', 65'; Cicchi 67' |

Umpires:
Matias Barbosa (CHL)
Ben de Young (AUS)

25 May 2016
15:30

| Trinidad and Tobago | 2–3 | Canada |
|---|---|---|
| Ta. Marcano 20'; Reynos 44' | Report | Chopra 13'; Pereira 33'; Harris 52' |

Umpires:
Paul Walker (ENG)
Benjamin Peters (USA)

25 May 2016
17:45

| Chile | 11–0 | Puerto Rico |
|---|---|---|
| Strabucchi 7'; Hurtado 9'; Amoroso 23', 29', 70+'; Goni 36'; F. Renz 42'; Troncoso 49', 55'; Olavarria 51'; Bravo 70' | Report |

Umpires:
Hugo Romero Chamorro (PAR)
Michael Harding (GUY)

=== Fifth to eighth place classification ===
Cross-overs
27 May
Guyana | 2
Mexico | 3
27 May
Trinidad and Tobago | 11
Puerto Rico | 0

Fifth place
28 May
Mexico | 2
Trinidad and Tobago | 4
Seventh place
28 May
Guyana | 4
Puerto Rico | 2

==== Cross-overs ====
27 May 2016
10:00

| Guyana | 2–3 | Mexico |
|---|---|---|
| McKenzie 16'; Branford 43' | Report | Aguilar 4'; Arballo 39'; Lemus 65' |

Umpires:
Kevin George (TTO)
Hugo Romero Chamorro (PAR)

27 May 2016
12:30

| Trinidad and Tobago | 11–0 | Puerto Rico |
|---|---|---|
| Te. Marcano 1', 59'; Kr. Emmanuel 4', 24'; Paul 6'; Ta. Marcano 20', 26'; Ki. Emmanuel 22', 51', 61', 68' | Report |

Umpires:
Jonathan Altamirano (MEX)
Michael Harding (GUY)

==== Seventh and eighth place ====
28 May 2016
10:00

| Guyana | 4–2 | Puerto Rico |
|---|---|---|
| Stewart 8'; Chester 51'; Branford 63', 65' | Report | Stewart-Hill 4'; Fuentes Rios 54' |

Umpires:
Kevin George (TTO)
Jonathan Altamirano (MEX)

==== Fifth and sixth place ====
28 May 2016
12:30

| Mexico | 2–4 | Trinidad and Tobago |
|---|---|---|
| Othon 11'; Lemus 55' | Report | Ki. Emmanuel 20'; Kr. Emmanuel 47'; Te. Marcano 56'; Vieira 67' |

Umpires:
Matias Barbosa (CHL)
Michael Harding (GUY)

=== First to fourth place classification ===
==== Semi-finals ====
27 May 2016
15:00

| Argentina | 10–0 | United States |
|---|---|---|
| Domene 6', 23', 40'; Casella 25', 26', 35', 63', 67'; Acosta 45', 64' | Report |

Umpires:
Tyler Klenk (CAN)
Matias Barbosa (CHL)

27 May 2016
17:30

| Canada | 3–1 | Chile |
|---|---|---|
| Boothroyd 12'; Dhaliwal 44'; Aujla 61' | Report | N. Renz 27' |

Umpires:
Federico Silva (ARG)
Paul Walker (ENG)

==== Third and fourth place ====
28 May 2016
15:00

| United States | 1–4 | Chile |
|---|---|---|
| Cicchi 4' | Report | Bravo 40'; Amoroso 48'; F. Renz 60'; N. Renz 65' |

Umpires:
Tyler Klenk (CAN)
Federico Silva (ARG)

==== Final ====
28 May 2016
17:30

| Argentina | 5–0 | Canada |
|---|---|---|
| Casella 7', 64'; Keenan 24'; Domene 45'; Bugallo 69' | Report |

Umpires:
Ben de Young (AUS)
Benjamin Peters (USA)

== Statistics ==
=== Final standings ===
| Pos | Team | Pld | W | D | L | GF | GA | GD | Pts | Qualification |
|---|---|---|---|---|---|---|---|---|---|---|
| 1st place, gold medalist(s) | Argentina | 6 | 6 | 0 | 0 | 62 | 0 | +62 | 18 | 2016 FIH Junior World Cup |
| 2nd place, silver medalist(s) | Canada (H) | 6 | 3 | 0 | 3 | 17 | 13 | +4 | 9 | 2016 FIH Junior World Cup |
| 3rd place, bronze medalist(s) | Chile | 6 | 5 | 0 | 1 | 28 | 8 | +20 | 15 | |
| 4 | United States | 6 | 2 | 0 | 4 | 13 | 30 | −17 | 6 | |
| 5 | Trinidad and Tobago | 6 | 4 | 0 | 2 | 36 | 11 | +25 | 12 | |
| 6 | Mexico | 6 | 3 | 0 | 3 | 19 | 15 | +4 | 9 | |
| 7 | Guyana | 6 | 1 | 0 | 5 | 8 | 39 | −31 | 3 | |
| 8 | Puerto Rico | 6 | 0 | 0 | 6 | 2 | 69 | −67 | 0 | |

Source: FIH
(H) Hosts

=== Goalscorers ===
There were 185 goals scored in 24 matches, for an average of 7.71 goals per match.

18 goals

- (Argentina) Maico Casella

16 goals

- (Argentina) Tomás Domene

8 goals

- (United States) Sean Cicchi

7 goals

- (Argentina) Nicolás Acosta
- (Argentina) Martín Ferreiro
- (Trinidad and Tobago) Kristien Emmanuel

6 goals

- (Chile) Juan Amoroso
- (Trinidad and Tobago) Kieron Emmanuel
- (Trinidad and Tobago) Teague Marcano

5 goals

- (Argentina) Federico Moreschi
- (Chile) Nicolás Renz
- (Guyana) Aroydy Branford
- (Mexico) Reymundo Lemus
- (Trinidad and Tobago) Tariq Marcano

4 goals

- (Canada) Kabir Aujla
- (Canada) Brandon Pereira

3 goals

- (Chile) Nicolás Bravo
- (Chile) José Hurtado
- (Chile) Axel Troncoso
- (Mexico) Ivan Arballo
- (Mexico) Irvin Chávez
- (Trinidad and Tobago) Jarryon Paul
- (United States) George McGuigan

2 goals

- (Argentina) Ladislao Gencarelli
- (Argentina) Nicolás Keenan
- (Argentina) Ignacio Nepote
- (Canada) Shahbaaz Dhaliwal
- (Canada) Thomson Harris
- (Canada) Arshjit Sidhu
- (Chile) Felipé Renz
- (Chile) Nils Strabbuchi
- (Mexico) Maximiliano Méndez
- (Mexico) Daniel Rangel
- (Trinidad and Tobago) Dylan Francis
- (Trinidad and Tobago) Jordan Reynos
- (Trinidad and Tobago) Jordan Vieira
- (United States) Stuart Kentwell

1 goal

- (Argentina) Agustín Bugallo
- (Argentina) Agustín Rios
- (Argentina) Santiago Tarazona
- (Canada) Fin Boothroyd
- (Canada) Rohan Chopra
- (Canada) Jonathan Gill
- (Chile) Franco Beccera
- (Chile) Kay Gesswein
- (Chile) Vicente Goñi
- (Chile) Joaquín Olavarria
- (Guyana) Hilton Chester
- (Guyana) Keon McKenzie
- (Guyana) Andrew Stewart
- (Mexico) Jorge Aguilar
- (Mexico) Yamil Méndez
- (Mexico) Miguel Othon
- (Mexico) Luis Villegas
- (Puerto Rico) Jesús Stewart-Hill
- (Puerto Rico) Eddie Fuentes Rios
- (Trinidad and Tobago) Ché Modeste
- (Trinidad and Tobago) Marcus Pascal
- (Trinidad and Tobago) Jovan Wren

Source: FIH

== See also ==
- 2016 Women's Pan-Am Junior Championship
