= Yu Seung-jin =

South Korean hockey player

Personal information
- Nationality: South Korean
- Born: 20 January 1969 (age 57)

Sport
- Sport: Field hockey
- Now coaching: Monarch Mart Padma
Medal record
Men's field hockey
Representing South Korea
Asian Games
Gold medal – first place	1986 Seongnam	Team
Gold medal – first place	1994 Hiroshima	Team

Yu Seung-jin (born 20 January 1969) is a former South Korean field hockey player and currently the head coach of the China national field hockey team. He competed at the 1988 Summer Olympics and the 1996 Summer Olympics. He is the head coach of Monarch Mart Padma.
