= Saiful Azli bin Abdul Rahman =

Malaysian field hockey player (born 1977)

Personal information
- Born: 20 August 1977 (age 48)

Sport
- Sport: Field hockey
Coaching career
- Years: Team
- 2022: Walton Dhaka

Saiful Azli bin Abdul Rahman (born 20 August 1977) is a Malaysian field hockey player. He competed in the men's tournament at the 2000 Summer Olympics.
