= Metro Group (Bangladesh) =

- Formation: 1971
- Type: Conglomerate
- Headquarters: Dhaka, Bangladesh
- Region served: Bangladesh
- Official language: Bengali
- Website: metrogroup-bd.com

Metro Group (Bengali: মেট্রো গ্রুপ) is a Bangladeshi diversified conglomerate based in Dhaka. It is the parent company of Best Holding Limited, which owns Le Meridien Dhaka.

== History ==
Al- Amin Construction Company Limited in 1970.

In the 1980s, Central Pharmaceuticals Limited was established after the liberalization of the pharmaceutical market in Bangladesh by GETCO Group (Greenland Engineers & Tractors Company) and BanglaCAT (Bangla Trac Group). In 1993, Central Pharmaceuticals Limited was purchased by Metro Group.

Amin Ahmad is the managing director and founder of Best Holding Limited and Hasan Ahmad is the chairman of Best Holding Limited.

In 2006, Mayor of Dhaka City Corporation, Sadeque Hossain Khoka, signed an agreement with Amin Associates Overseas Company Limited, a subsidiary of Metro Group, to build a 20-floor tower on the site of the DCC market. Since then, the group has been involved in the legal battle over the ownership with the shop owners of the market who were left out of the negotiations. By 2017, Metro Group stood on the verge of losing their agreement following a fire at the market on 3 January. The shop owners blamed the fire on Metro Group.

Best Holding Limited started construction of Le Méridien Dhaka in 2006 and started operations in 2015. It had borrowed 12 billion taka to construct the hotel.

Metro Group founded Sky Telecommunication along with Karnaphuli Group and Partex Star Group (Partex Group). Sky Telecommunication manufactures Zelta branded cellphones, launched in 2015.

In May 2018, news spread that Metro Group would sell Central Pharmaceuticals to Alif Group which raises the price of its shares on the stock market by 88 percent. The initial news of the sale came out in February 2017. Directors of Central Pharmaceuticals Parvez Ahmed Bhuiyan and Md Rukunuzzaman sold their shares in the company to the general public taking advantage of the increased prices and without informing the Bangladesh Securities and Exchange Commission.

On 30 October 2018, Best Holding Limited hired Shakib Al Hasan as their brand ambassador. On 15 January 2019, issued bond to pay off the loan from the construction of Le Méridien Dhaka.

On 17 December 2020, the Bangladesh Securities and Exchange Commission stopped the listing of Best Holding Limited on the Dhaka Stock Exchange as it did not allow direct listing of private companies. 52 percent of the shares of the company are owned by its founders while four state owned banks (Agrani Bank, Janata Bank, Rupali Bank Limited, and Sonali Bank) own almost 30 percent of the remaining shares. The Ministry of Finance ordered a change in policy to allow private infrastructure companies to directly list on the stock market after failed bids by Best Holdings Limited and Akash DTH. On 18 December 2020, the Ministry of Finance suspended its directives to the exchange commission following media reports. Best Holding named Investment Corporation of Bangladesh as its issue manager, but Investment Corporation of Bangladesh denied any involvement. The other issue manager was RACE Portfolio and Issue Management which is owned by Chowdhury Nafeez Sarafat.

On 20 December 2020, Morsheda Ahmed, director of Central Pharmaceuticals Limited announced plans to buy back 4.11 percent of the company's shares from the stock market. In August 2021, the price of Central Pharmaceuticals shares rose 32 percent unexpectedly in the Dhaka Stock Exchange despite the company operating at a loss.

On 21 August 2021, the Ministry of Finance recommended that the four state-owned banks (Agrani Bank, Janata Bank, Rupali Bank Limited, and Sonali Bank) not seek their guaranteed dividends from Best Holdings Limited.

== Businesses ==
- Al- Amin Construction Company Limited
- Central Pharmaceuticals Limited
- Metro Services Limited
- Metro Unitrade Limited
- Amin Associates Overseas Company Limited
- Best Holdings Limited (Le Méridien Dhaka, The Muslin, a Luxury Collection Resort, Bhaluka, and Marriott Bhaluka)
- G2G Assignment Limited
- Empori

=== Best Holding Limited (a subsidiary of Metro Group) ===
- Le Méridien Dhaka (Le ROYAL yearly membership)
- The Muslin, a Luxury Collection Resort Bhaluka
- Marriott Bhaluka
- Haileybury Bhaluka
- Haileybury Dhaka
- Dhamshur Economic Zone
- Niloy Agro and Food Processing Economic Zone
- CS49
- Bestcom
