= Brandon Pereira =

Canadian field hockey player

Personal information
- Full name: Brandon Anthony Pereira
- Born: 30 April 1996 (age 30) Surrey, British Columbia, Canada
- Height: 1.85 m (6 ft 1 in)

Sport
- Sport: Field hockey
- Position: Defender
- Club: United Brothers
Senior career
Years	Team	Caps	Goals
–	United Brothers	-	-
National team
Years	Team	Caps	Goals
2017–	Canada	61	(0)
Medal record
Representing Canada
Men's field hockey
Pan American Games
Silver medal – second place	2019 Lima	Team
Pan American Cup
Silver medal – second place	2017 Lancaster
Pan American Junior Championship
Silver medal – second place	2016 Toronto
Men's Hockey5s
Summer Youth Olympics
Silver medal – second place	2014 Nanjing	Team
- Updated on 24 July 2021

Brandon Anthony Pereira (born April 30, 1996) is a Canadian field hockey player who plays as a defender for United Brothers and the Canadian national team.

== International career ==
Pereira represented Canada at two Junior World Cups: 2013 in New Delhi and 2016 in Lucknow. He captained the Canadian team that won the silver medal at the 2014 Youth Olympics in Nanjing, China. He was part of the national team that clinched silver at the 2017 Men's Pan American Cup in Lancaster, United States. He was selected for the 2018 World Cup, but he only played one game because he picked up an injury in the first match. In June 2019, he was selected in the Canada squad for the 2019 Pan American Games. They won the silver medal as they lost 5–2 to Argentina in the final.

== Personal life ==
Pereira was born on 30 April 1996 in Surrey, British Columbia. His grandfather played field hockey for Uganda at the 1972 Olympics, while his father also played the sport.

As of April 2016, having completed level 1 course to be an electrician, Pereira is working with a contractor.
