= Juan Martín López =

Argentine field hockey player

Personal information
- Born: 27 May 1985 (age 41) Buenos Aires, Argentina
- Height: 1.78 m (5 ft 10 in)
- Weight: 74 kg (163 lb)

Sport
- Sport: Field hockey
- Position: Defender
- Club: Metro Express Barishal
Senior career
Years	Team	Caps	Goals
–	Banco Provincia	-	-
–	Leuven	-	-
–	Banco Provincia	-	-
2022	Metro Express Barishal	-	-
National team
Years	Team	Caps	Goals
2006–2021	Argentina	316	(12)
Medal record
Olympic Games
Gold medal – first place	2016 Rio de Janeiro	Team
World Cup
Bronze medal – third place	2014 The Hague
Pan American Games
Gold medal – first place	2011 Guadalajara	Team
Gold medal – first place	2015 Toronto	Team
Gold medal – first place	2019 Lima	Team
Pan American Cup
Gold medal – first place	2013 Brampton
Gold medal – first place	2017 Lancaster
Champions Trophy
Bronze medal – third place	2008 Rotterdam
World League
Silver medal – second place	2016–17 Bhubaneswar	Team

Juan Martín López (born 27 May 1985) is an Argentine field hockey player for Banco Provincia. At the 2012 Summer Olympics, he competed for the national team in the men's tournament. Juan Martín has won the bronze medal at the 2014 Men's Hockey World Cup and three gold medals at the Pan American Games. The midfielder was also part of the Argentinian squad which won the gold medal at the 2016 Summer Olympics. He plays club hockey for Banco Provincia.
