= Bangladesh Hockey Federation =

Governing body of field hockey in Bangladesh

- Sport: Field hockey
- Jurisdiction: Bangladesh
- Founded: 1972
- Affiliation: FIH
- Regional affiliation: AHF
- President: Air Chief Marshal Hasan Mahmood Khan BBP, OSP, GUP
- Secretary: Mominul Haque Sayed
- Coach: Mamun Ur Rashid

Official website
- bangladeshhockey.org
- (Bangladesh)

The Bangladesh Hockey Federation is the governing body of field hockey in Bangladesh. It is affiliated to IHF International Hockey Federation and AHF Asian Hockey Federation. The headquarters of the federation are in Dhaka, Bangladesh.

Air Chief Marshal Sheikh Abdul Hannan is the President of the Bangladesh Hockey Federation and Mominul Haque Sayed is the General Secretary.

== Competitions ==
- Hockey Champions Trophy Bangladesh
- Dhaka Premier Division Hockey League
- First Division Hockey League
- Second Division Hockey League
- National Hockey League
- National Youth Hockey League
- Independence Day Hockey Tournament
- National Hockey Championship
- National Youth Hockey Championship
- Victory Day Hockey Tournament

== See also ==
- Bangladesh men's national field hockey team
- Bangladesh men's national under-21 field hockey team
- Bangladesh women's national field hockey team
