= West Vancouver Field Hockey Club =

- Full name: West Vancouver Field Hockey Club
- League: Vancouver Women's Field Hockey Association, Vancouver Men's Field Hockey League
- Founded: 1972; 53 years ago
- Colors: Maroon, white
- Home ground: Rutledge Field, Ambleside, West Vancouver, British Columbia, Canada

Personnel
- Manager: Geoff Matthews
- Website: http://www.wvfhc.com
Home

West Vancouver Field Hockey Club is a field hockey club based in West Vancouver, British Columbia, Canada, it was established in 1972. With over 2500 members from both North Vancouver (city and district municipality) and West Vancouver, it is the largest field hockey club in North America and home to some of Canada's top players. It is often abbreviated to WVFHC.

The club consists of four independent divisions: Junior Girls and Boys, Women's, Men's and the Adanacs player development program. The Women's teams play in the Vancouver Women's Field Hockey Association, while the Men's teams play in the Vancouver Men's Field Hockey League. Both leagues include teams from throughout the Lower Mainland of British Columbia and Vancouver Island.

Since its inception in 2004, over 85 graduates of the Adanacs player development program have gone on to play on U Sports and NCAA teams. Players from WVFHC have gone on to attend prestigious universities in the United States like Princeton, Harvard, Stanford, Boston College and many more.

Several club members have gone on to play on the Canada women's national field hockey team and Canada men's national field hockey team.

== Notable members ==
- Jessica Barnett, National Team player
- Ian Bird, Olympian, National Team player
- Johanna Bischof, National Team player
- Taylor Curran, National Team player
- Rachael Donohoe, National Team player
- Hannah Haughn, National Team player
- Karli Johanson, National Team player
- Ashley Kristen, National Team player
- Tiffany Michaluk, National Team player
- Peter Milkovich, coach, Olympian, National Team player
- Stephanie Norlander, National Team player
- Mark Pearson, coach, Olympian, National Team player
- Ross Rutledge, coach, founder of the Adanacs program, Olympian, National Team
- Holly Stewart, National Team player
- Scott Tupper, coach, Men's Premier team player, Olympian, current National Team captain
- Paul Wettlaufer, Olympian, National Team
- Amanda Bird, Princeton University, player, scored the winning goal in overtime to win the NCAA Tournament in 2012
