= 2007–08 Euro Hockey League =

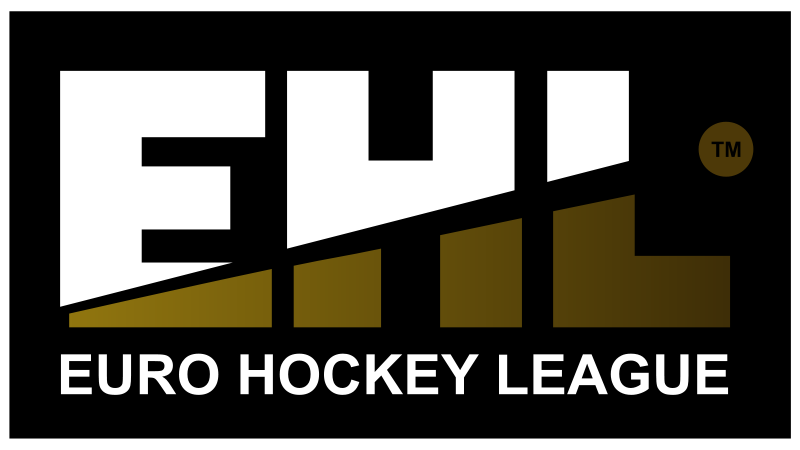

Tournament details
- Host countries: Belgium; Netherlands; Spain
- Dates: 26 October 2007 – 11 May 2008
- Teams: 24 (from 12 associations)
- Venue: 4 (in 4 host cities)

Final positions
- Champions: (Germany) UHC Hamburg (1st title)
- Runner-up: (Netherlands) HGC
- Third place: (Netherlands) Rotterdam

Tournament statistics
- Matches played: 40
- Goals scored: 196 (4.9 per match)
- Top scorer(s): (Netherlands) Jeroen Hertzberger (Pakistan) Sohail Abbas (7 goals)
- Best player: (Germany) Moritz Fuerste

The 2007–08 Euro Hockey League was the inaugural season of the Euro Hockey League, Europe's premier club field hockey tournament organized by the EHF.

The final was played between UHC Hamburg and HGC at the Hazelaarweg Stadion in Rotterdam, Netherlands. UHC Hamburg defeated HGC after extra time by 1–0 to win the first edition of the Euro Hockey League.

== Teams ==
Champions
(Netherlands) Bloemendaal	(Poland) Pocztowiec Poznań	(France) Saint Germain
(Spain) Atlètic Terrassa	(Belgium) Antwerp	(Ireland) Pembroke Wanderers
(Germany) Club an der Alster	(Russia) Dinamo Kazan	(Switzerland) Luzerner SC
(England) Reading	(Scotland) Kelburne	(Austria) AHTC Wien
Runners-up		Third placed
(Netherlands) HGC	(Poland) Grunwald Poznań	(Netherlands) Rotterdam
(Spain) Club Egara	(Belgium) Waterloo Ducks	(Spain) Real Club de Polo
(Germany) UHC Hamburg	(Russia) Dinamo Elektrostal	(Germany) Crefelder HTC
(England) Cannock	(Scotland) Grange	(England) Loughborough

== Round one ==
Pools A, D, G and H were played in Wassenaar, Netherlands between 26 and 28 October 2007 and the other four pools were played in Antwerp, Belgium between 2 and 4 November 2007. If a game was won, the winning team received 5 points. A draw resulted in both teams receiving 2 points. A loss gave the losing team 1 point unless the losing team lost by 3 or more goals, then they received 0 points.

=== Pool A ===
Pos	Team	Pld	W	D	L	GF	GA	GD	Pts	Qualification
1	(Netherlands) Rotterdam	2	2	0	0	9	3	+6	10	Advance to knockout stage
2	(Spain) Atlètic Terrassa	2	1	0	1	5	5	0	6	Advance to knockout stage
3	(Scotland) Grange	2	0	0	2	2	8	−6	1	

Source: EHF

26 October 2007
16:30

Atlètic Terrassa (Spain)	3–1	(Scotland) Grange
Enrique 12'; Castelló 16'; Ribas 21'		Watt 32'

De Roggewoning, Wassenaar
Umpires:
Michiel Bruning (NED)
Geoff Conn (IRL)

27 October 2007
12:30

Atlètic Terrassa (Spain)	2–4	(Netherlands) Rotterdam
O. Freixa 7'; Enrique 31'		Tigges 2', 64'; J. Hertzberger 19'; Burrows 38'

De Roggewoning, Wassenaar
Umpires:
Christian Blasch (GER)
Andy Mair (SCO)

28 October 2007
14:30

Rotterdam (Netherlands)	5–1	(Scotland) Grange
Abbas 12', 38', 66'; J. Hertzberger 15'; W. Hertzberger 68'		Dunn 48'

De Roggewoning, Wassenaar
Umpires:
Marcelo Servetto (ESP)
Warren McCully (IRL)

=== Pool B ===
Pos	Team	Pld	W	D	L	GF	GA	GD	Pts	Qualification
1	(Spain) Real Club de Polo	2	2	0	0	11	3	+8	10	Advance to knockout stage
2	(Belgium) Antwerp (H)	2	0	1	1	4	5	−1	3	Advance to knockout stage
3	(Russia) Dinamo Elektrostal	2	0	1	1	5	12	−7	2	

Source: EHF
(H) Hosts

2 November 2007
14:30

Antwerp (Belgium)	3–3	(Russia) Dinamo Elektrostal
Nao 21'; Lens 42'; Kholopov 45'		Mamoshkin 37'; Azarov 53', 64'

Royal Antwerp Hockey Club
Umpires:
Henrik Ehlers (DEN)
Bjorn Bachmann (GER)

3 November 2007
10:30

Real Club de Polo (Spain)	9–2	(Russia) Dinamo Elektrostal
Borrell 10'; Alastrue 17'; Amat 20', 63', 69'; Martinez-Zurita 33'; Padros 46', 58'; A. Fabregas 55'		Azarov 25' (PS); Buranov 59'

Royal Antwerp Hockey Club
Umpires:
Marc Knulle (FRA)
Marcin Grochal (POL)

4 November 2007
12:30

Antwerp (Belgium)	1–2	(Spain) Real Club de Polo
Mark-Jan 11'		F. Fabregas 38'; Wein 69' (PS)

Royal Antwerp Hockey Club
Umpires:
Roderick Wijsmuller (NED)
Ged Curran (SCO)

=== Pool C ===
Pos	Team	Pld	W	D	L	GF	GA	GD	Pts	Qualification
1	(Germany) UHC Hamburg	2	1	1	0	8	4	+4	7	Advance to knockout stage
2	(Netherlands) Bloemendaal	2	1	1	0	6	5	+1	7	Advance to knockout stage
3	(Poland) Grunwald Poznań	2	0	0	2	3	8	−5	1	

Source: EHF

2 November 2007
18:30

UHC Hamburg (Germany)	5–1	(Poland) Grunwald Poznań
Sunkel 14', 52'; Kopp 25'; J. Furste 56'; Breitenstein 58'		Dutkiewicz 42'

Royal Antwerp Hockey Club
Umpires:
Ged Curran (SCO)
Thomas Dumon (BEL)

3 November 2007
14:30

Bloemendaal (Netherlands)	3–3	(Germany) UHC Hamburg
Brouwer 31', 34'; Jolie 45'		Breitenstein 4'; Sunkel 49'; Kopp 70'

Royal Antwerp Hockey Club
Umpires:
Chris McConkey (IRL)
Ged Curran (SCO)

4 November 2007
14:30

Bloemendaal (Netherlands)	3–2	(Poland) Grunwald Poznań
Stalling 31', 45'; Jenniskens 60'		Mikula 24'; Dutkiewicz 47'

Royal Antwerp Hockey Club
Umpires:
Hendrik Ehlers (DEN)
Michael Eilmer (AUT)

=== Pool D ===
Pos	Team	Pld	W	D	L	GF	GA	GD	Pts	Qualification
1	(Netherlands) HGC (H)	2	1	1	0	5	3	+2	7	Advance to knockout stage
2	(Belgium) Waterloo Ducks	2	0	2	0	4	4	0	4	Advance to knockout stage
3	(Germany) Club an der Alster	2	0	1	1	3	5	−2	3	

Source: EHF
(H) Hosts

26 October 2007
18:30

Club an der Alster (Germany)	2–2	(Belgium) Waterloo Ducks
Hentschep 30'; Hentschel 37'		Garreta 43', 60'

De Roggewoning, Wassenaar
Umpires:
Marcelo Servetto (ESP)
Andrew Mair (SCO)

27 October 2007
14:30

Club an der Alster (Germany)	1–3	(Netherlands) HGC
Froschle 66'		Magee 33'; Jermyn 49', 57'

De Roggewoning, Wassenaar
Umpires:
Marcelo Servetto (ESP)
Andrew Kennedy (ENG)

28 October 2007
14:30

HGC (Netherlands)	2–2	(Belgium) Waterloo Ducks
Lomans 5', 44'		Garreta 29'; De Saedeleer 47'

De Roggewoning, Wassenaar
Umpires:
Andrew Kennedy (ENG)
Nathan Stagno (GIB)

=== Pool E ===
Pos	Team	Pld	W	D	L	GF	GA	GD	Pts	Qualification
1	(England) Loughborough Students	2	2	0	0	5	2	+3	10	Advance to knockout stage
2	(Scotland) Kelburne	2	1	0	1	6	6	0	6	Advance to knockout stage
3	(Switzerland) Luzerner SC	2	0	0	2	4	7	−3	2	

Source: EHF

2 November 2007
16:30

Loughborough Students (England)	2–1	(Switzerland) Luzerner SC
Richard Smith 32' (PS); Dobson 70'		Bamberg 53'

Royal Antwerp Hockey Club
Umpires:
Marcin Grochal (FRA)
Marc Knulle (POL)

3 November 2007
12:30

Kelburne (Scotland)	1–3	(England) Loughborough Students
N. Stott 57'		Robert Smith 19'; Osborn 27'; Richard Smith 62'

Royal Antwerp Hockey Club
Umpires:
Henrik Ehlers (DEN)
Thomas Dumon (BEL)

4 November 2007
10:30

Kelburne (Scotland)	5–3	(Switzerland) Luzerner SC
Bain 7'; N. Stott 16'; J. Christie 57', 59'; M. Christie 60'		Koch 22'; Casagrande 52'; Stubi 53'

Royal Antwerp Hockey Club
Umpires:
Chris McConkey (IRL)
Marcin Grochal (POL)

=== Pool F ===
Pos	Team	Pld	W	D	L	GF	GA	GD	Pts	Qualification
1	(Spain) Club Egara	2	2	0	0	10	4	+6	10	Advance to knockout stage
2	(Poland) Pocztowiec Poznań	2	1	0	1	5	9	−4	5	Advance to knockout stage
3	(Ireland) Pembroke Wanderers	2	0	0	2	4	6	−2	2	

Source: EHF

2 November 2007
20:30

Club Egara (Spain)	3–2	(Ireland) Pembroke Wanderers
Tubau 8', 26'; Schickendantz 29'		Fulton 15'; Elliot 58'

Royal Antwerp Hockey Club
Umpires:
Roderick Wijsmuller (NED)
Michael Eilmer (AUT)

3 November 2007
16:30

Pocztowiec Poznań (Poland)	2–7	(Spain) Club Egara
Mikula 33'; Juszczak 69'		Romeu 7', 44'; Schickendantz 29', 64'; Arbos 50', 57', 62'

Royal Antwerp Hockey Club
Umpires:
Lionel van Lidth (BEL)
Roderick Wijsmuller (NED)

4 November 2007
16:30

Pocztowiec Poznań (Poland)	3–2	(Ireland) Pembroke Wanderers
Wybieralski 43'; Majchrzak 51'; Michniak 70'		Symons 12'; Fulton 30'

Royal Antwerp Hockey Club
Umpires:
Bjorn Bachmann (GER)
Thomas Dumon (BEL)

=== Pool G ===
Pos	Team	Pld	W	D	L	GF	GA	GD	Pts	Qualification
1	(France) Saint Germain	2	0	2	0	4	4	0	4	Advance to knockout stage
2	(England) Reading	2	0	2	0	3	3	0	4 (Note: Reading won second place on a penalty shootout)	Advance to knockout stage
3	(Germany) Crefelder HTC	2	0	2	0	3	3	0	4	

Source: EHF
Notes:

26 October 2007
20:30

Crefelder HTC (Germany)	2–2	(France) Saint Germain
Musgens 37'; M. Witthaus 68'		Branquart 25'; Dierkens 43'

De Roggewoning, Wassenaar
Umpires:
Nathan Stagno (GIB)
Sergey Makarov (RUS)

27 October 2007
16:30

Reading (England)	1–1	(Germany) Crefelder HTC
S. Mantell 58' (PS)		T. Witthaus 58' (PS)

De Roggewoning, Wassenaar
Umpires:
Michiel Bruning (NED)
Warren McCully (IRL)

28 October 2007
16:30

Reading (England)	2–2	(France) Saint Germain
Clarke 55'; R. Mantell 58'		M. Genestet 13'; Dierckens 24'

De Roggewoning, Wassenaar
Umpires:
Christian Blasch (GER)
Thomas Lingg (SUI)

=== Pool H ===
Pos	Team	Pld	W	D	L	GF	GA	GD	Pts	Qualification
1	(England) Cannock	2	2	0	0	4	2	+2	10	Advance to knockout stage
2	(Russia) Dinamo Kazan	2	1	0	1	5	3	+2	6	Advance to knockout stage
3	(Austria) AHTC Wien	2	0	0	2	2	6	−4	1	

Source: EHF

26 October 2007
14:30

Dinamo Kazan (Russia)	1–2	(England) Cannock
A. Gevorkyan 4'	Report	Ramsden 18'; Andrew 35'

De Roggewoning, Wassenaar
Umpires:
Christian Blasch (GER)
Thomas Lingg (SUI)

27 October 2007
10:30

Cannock (England)	2–1	(Austria) AHTC Wien
Andrew 19'; West 25'	Report	Laminger 9'

De Roggewoning, Wassenaar
Umpires:
Nathan Stagno (GIB)
Geoff Conn (IRL)

28 October 2007
10:30

Dinamo Kazan (Russia)	4–1	(Austria) AHTC Wien
S. Gevorkyan 10', 44'; Margaryan 64'; Arutyunyan 65'	Report	Proksch 47'

De Roggewoning, Wassenaar
Umpires:
Andy Mair (SCO)
Michiel Brüning (NED)

== Knockout stage ==
The Round of 16 and the quarter-finals were played in Terrassa, Spain between 21 and 24 March 2008 and the semi-finals, third place match and the final were played in Rotterdam, Netherlands between 10 and 11 May 2008.

Round of 16
21 March
(Germany) UHC Hamburg (a.e.t.)	4
(Scotland) Kelburne	3
21 March
(England) Loughborough	2
(Belgium) Antwerp	0
21 March
(France) Saint Germain	1
(Russia) Dinamo Kazan	0
22 March
(Spain) Club Egara	3
(Netherlands) Bloemendaal	2
22 March
(England) Cannock	1
(England) Reading	2
22 March
(Netherlands) Rotterdam	6
(Belgium) Waterloo Ducks	1
22 March
(Netherlands) HGC	7
(Poland) Pocztowiec Poznań	5
21 March
(Spain) Real Club de Polo	2 (4)
(Spain) Atlètic Terrassa (p.s.)	2 (5)

Quarter-finals
23 March
(Germany) UHC Hamburg	2
(England) Loughborough	1
24 March
(France) Saint Germain	0
(Spain) Club Egara	4
24 March
(England) Reading	2
(Netherlands) Rotterdam	3
23 March
(Netherlands) HGC	2
(Spain) Atlètic Terrassa	1

Semi-finals
10 May
(Germany) UHC Hamburg	5
(Spain) Club Egara	2
10 May
(Netherlands) Rotterdam	4
(Netherlands) HGC	7

Final
11 May
(Germany) UHC Hamburg (a.e.t.)	1
(Netherlands) HGC	0
Third place
11 May
(Spain) Club Egara	2 (1)
(Netherlands) Rotterdam (p.s.)	2 (2)

=== Round of 16 ===
21 March 2008
09:30

Loughborough Students (England)	2–0	(Belgium) Antwerp
Smith 55'; Bleby 64'	Report

Pla de Bon Aire, Terrassa
Umpires:
Ged Curran (SCO)
Michiel Bruning (NED)

21 March 2008
12:00

Real Club de Polo (Spain)	2–2 (a.e.t.)	(Spain) Atlètic Terrassa
Borrell 13'; Amat 43'		Oliva 3'; Enrique 35'
Penalties
Borrell (penalty shoot-out scored); Amat (penalty shoot-out scored); Wein (penalty shoot-out missed)	2–3	(penalty shoot-out scored) Enrique; (penalty shoot-out scored) I. Freixa; (penalty shoot-out scored) Salles

Pla de Bon Aire, Terrassa
Umpires:
Hamish Jamson (ENG)
Vincent Loos (BEL)

21 March 2008
14:30

HGC (Netherlands)	6–1	(Russia) Dinamo Kazan
Lomans 8', 49'; Iding 16', 63'; Jermyn 38'; Kranstauber 42'	Report	A. Gevorkyan 39'

Pla de Bon Aire, Terrassa
Umpires:
Juan Manuel Requena (ESP)
Francisco Vazquez Lopez (ESP)

21 March 2008
17:00

Kelburne (Scotland)	3–4 (a.e.t.)	(Germany) UHC Hamburg
Hall 60'; Ralph 64'; Christie 68'	Report	Nevado 19'; Witte 53'; Fürste 56'; Sunkel 74' (GG)

Pla de Bon Aire, Terrassa
Umpires:
Gregory Maya-Perez (FRA)
James Pilgrim (ENG)

22 March 2008
09:30

Saint Germain (France)	7–5	(Poland) Pocztowiec Poznań
Branquart 3'; P. Verrier 22', 57'; C. Verrier 50', 70'; Rogeau 52'; Sevestre 62'	Report	Gorny 6'; Grotowski 27'; Juszczak 31', 35'; Rachwalski 65'

Pla de Bon Aire, Terrassa
Umpires:
Juan Manuel Requena (ESP)
Vincent Loos (BEL)

22 March 2008
12:00

Rotterdam (Netherlands)	6–1	(Belgium) Waterloo Ducks
J. Hertzberger 10', 31', 37'; Burrows 27', 61'; Gommers 50'	Report	De Cock 7'

Pla de Bon Aire, Terrassa
Umpires:
Francisco Vazquez Lopez (ESP)
James Pilgrim (ENG)

22 March 2008
14:30

Club Egara (Spain)	3–2	(Netherlands) Bloemendaal
G. Schickendantz 11', 30'; Alegre 70'	Report	Docherty 57'; Brouwer 60'

Pla de Bon Aire, Terrassa
Umpires:
Ged Curran (SCO)
Hamish Jamson (ENG)

22 March 2008
17:00

Cannock (England)	1–2	(England) Reading
Taylor 53'	Report	R. Mantell 15', 49'

Pla de Bon Aire, Terrassa
Umpires:
Michiel Bruning (NED)
Gregory Maya-Perez (FRA)

=== Quarter-finals ===
23 March 2008
12:00

UHC Hamburg (Germany)	2–1	(England) Loughborough Students
Sunkel 21'; Witte 51'	Report	Gregg 67'

Pla de Bon Aire, Terrassa
Umpires:
Ged Curran (SCO)
Francisco Vazquez Lopez (ESP)

23 March 2008
14:30

HGC (Netherlands)	2–1	(Spain) Atlètic Terrassa
Kraunstauber 17'; Lomans 65'	Report	Ribas 28'

Pla de Bon Aire, Terrassa
Umpires:
Hamish Jamson (ENG)
James Pilgrim (ENG)

24 March 2008
12:00

Saint Germain (France)	0–4	(Spain) Club Egara
	Report	Schickendantz 22'; Arbós 49'; Arch 63'; Tubau 68'

Pla de Bon Aire, Terrassa
Umpires:
Vincent Loos (BEL)
Michiel Bruning (NED)

24 March 2008
14:30

Reading (England)	2–3	(Netherlands) Rotterdam
R. Mantell 51', 61'	Report	Burrows 38'; J. Hertzberger 49'; Abbas 53'

Pla de Bon Aire, Terrassa
Umpires:
Juan Manuel Requena (ESP)
Ged Curran (SCO)

=== Semi-finals ===
10 May 2008
12:00

UHC Hamburg (Germany)	5–2	(Spain) Club Egara
Bretenstein 47', 64'; Sunkel 53'; Amend 63'; Kopp 65'	Report	Alegre 11'; Clapes 39'

Hazelaarweg Stadion, Rotterdam
Umpires:
Henrik Ehlers (DEN)
Andy Mair (SCO)

10 May 2008
14:30

Rotterdam (Netherlands)	4–7	(Netherlands) HGC
Abbas 26', 46'; J. Hertzberger 41'; M. van Vugt 70'	Report	Lomans 6'; Hofkamp 20'; Kranstauber 23'; Albers 28', 55'; Middleton 60'; Pereira 63'

Hazelaarweg Stadion, Rotterdam
Umpires:
Xavier Adell (ESP)
Christian Blasch (GER)

=== Third place play-off ===
11 May 2008
12:00

Club Egara (Spain)	2–2 (a.e.t.)	(Netherlands) Rotterdam
Tubau 4', 37'	Report	Abbas 26'; Gerretsen 32'
Penalties
Schickendantz (penalty shoot-out missed); Alegre (penalty shoot-out scored); Tubau (penalty shoot-out missed)	1–2	(penalty shoot-out scored) Hertzberger; (penalty shoot-out scored) Ahmad; (penalty shoot-out missed) De Jong

Hazelaarweg Stadion, Rotterdam
Umpires:
Christian Bläsch (GER)
Hamish Jamson (GBR)

=== Final ===
11 May 2008
14:30

UHC Hamburg (Germany)	1–0 (a.e.t.)	(Netherlands) HGC
Köpp 74' (GG)	Report

Hazelaarweg Stadion, Rotterdam
Umpires:
Xavier Adell (ESP)
Andy Mair (SCO)
