= David Forsyth (field hockey) =

Scottish field hockey player

Personal information
- Born: 26 February 1989 (age 37) Paisley, Renfrewshire, Scotland

Sport
- Sport: Field hockey
- Position: Defender
Senior career
Years	Team	Caps	Goals
2006–2013	Kelburne	-	-
2013–2015	THC Hurley	-	-
2015–2019	Qui Vive	-	-
National team
Years	Team	Caps	Goals
2010–2019	Scotland	76	-
Medal record
Representing Scotland
European Championship II
Bronze medal – third place	2015 Prague	Team
Gold medal – first place	2017 Glasgow	Team

David Forsyth (born 26 February 1989) is a Scottish field hockey player who has represented Scotland at two Commonwealth Games.

== Biography ==
Forsyth was born in Paisley, Renfrewshire, and was educated at Brediland Primary School and Gleniffer High School. He studied Event Management and International Marketing at the University of the West of Scotland from 2009 to 2012.

He played club hockey for Kelburne Hockey Club in the Scottish Hockey Premiership and won seven league titles with the club and made his Scotland debut in 2010 against the United States.

Forsyth left Scotland for the Netherlands to work for Adidas and played professional hockey in Amsterdam for THC Hurley and then Qui Vive.

Forsyth won a bronze medal with Scotland at the 2015 Men's EuroHockey Championship II in Prague and won a gold medal with Scotland at the 2017 Men's EuroHockey Championship II in Glasgow. While at Qui Vive, he participated in the Commonwealth Games hockey tournament at the 2018 Commonwealth Games in Gold Coast, Australia.

Forsyth retired from international hockey in July 2019 but remained in Amsterdam and as of 2025 was still working as a manager for Adidas.

== Family ==
His father Derek Forsyth was the head coach of Scotland and his brother Alan Forsyth won caps for Great Britain and Scotland.
