= Hockey at the 2010 Commonwealth Games – Men's tournament =

2010 Commonwealth Games–Men's hockey
Tournament details
- Host country: India
- City: New Delhi
- Dates: 4–14 October
- Teams: 10
- Venue: Dhyan Chand National Stadium

Final positions
- Champions: Australia (4th title)
- Runner-up: India
- Third place: New Zealand

Tournament statistics
- Matches played: 27
- Goals scored: 147 (5.44 per match)
- Top scorer: (Australia) Luke Doerner (8 goals)

The Men's field hockey event for the 2010 Commonwealth Games was held at the Dhyan Chand National Stadium from 4–14 October 2010. The Gold medal was won by Australia, who won their fourth consecutive Commonwealth title, Beating India 8–0 in the final. New Zealand beat England 5–3 on penalty strokes to snatch bronze.

== Umpires ==
Twelve umpires for the men's event were appointed by the International Hockey Federation.

- Richmond Attipoe (GHA)
- Will Drury (WAL)
- Gareth Greenfield (NZL)
- John Hrytsak (CAN)
- Andrew Kennedy (ENG)
- Satinder Kumar (IND)
- Martin Madden (SCO)
- Albert Marcano (TRI)
- Tim Pullman (AUS)
- Haider Rasool (PAK)
- Nathan Stagno (GIB)
- Peter Wright (RSA)

== Results ==
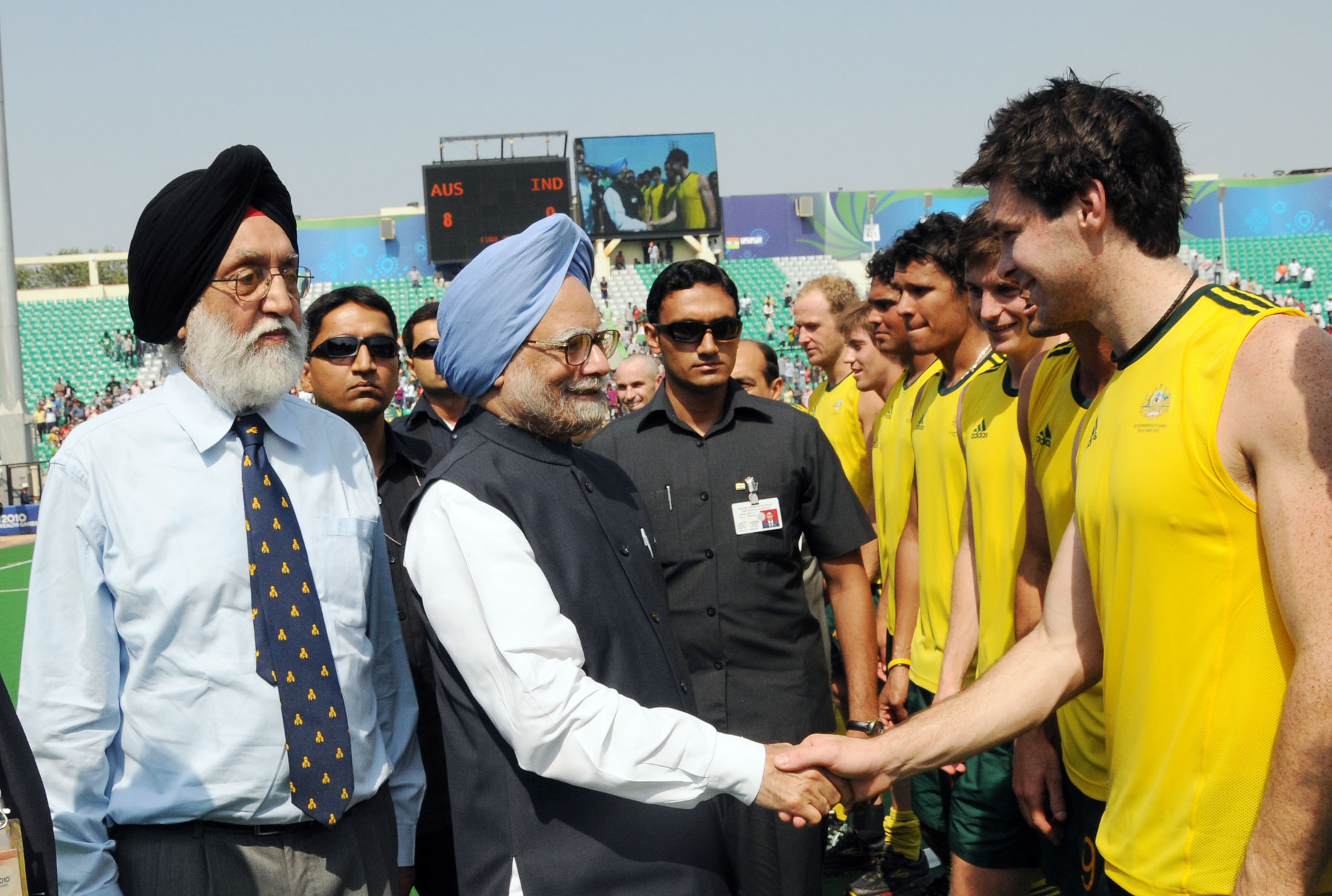
The Prime Minister, Dr. Manmohan Singh interacting with the Australian Hockey Team, at the XIX Commonwealth Games-2010 Delhi, at Major Dhyan Chand National Stadium, in New Delhi on October 14, 2010

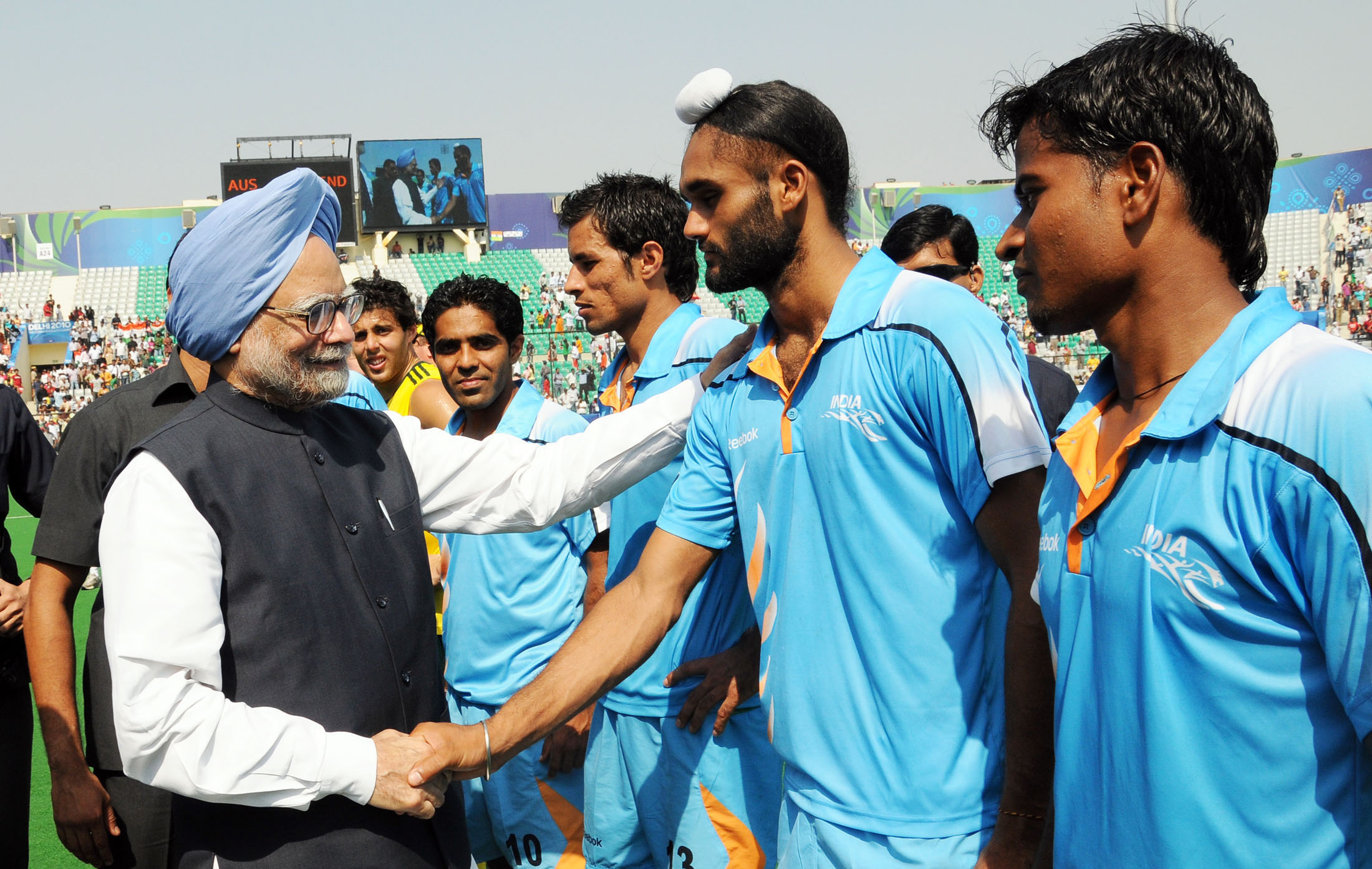
The Prime Minister, Dr. Manmohan Singh interacting with the Indian Hockey Team, at the XIX Commonwealth Games-2010 Delhi, at Major Dhyan Chand National Stadium, in New Delhi on October 14, 2010

=== Preliminary round ===
==== Pool A ====
Pos	Team	Pld	W	D	L	GF	GA	GD	Pts	Qualification
1	Australia	4	4	0	0	22	2	+20	12	Semi-finals
2	India (H)	4	3	0	1	16	11	+5	9	Semi-finals
3	Pakistan	4	2	0	2	11	9	+2	6	
4	Malaysia	4	1	0	3	5	14	−9	3	
5	Scotland	4	0	0	4	0	18	−18	0	

Source: The CGF
Rules for classification: 1) points; 2) goal difference; 3) goals scored; 4) head-to-head result.
(H) Hosts

5 October 2010
10:30

Pakistan	3–0	Scotland
Abbasi 20'; Butt 25'; Imran 43'	Report

Umpires:
Nathan Stagno (GIB)
Peter Wright (RSA)

5 October 2010
19:00

India	3–2	Malaysia
Mahadik 27'; Sandeep 35+'; Bharat 66'	Report	Hanafi 15'; Misron 34'

Umpires:
Gareth Greenfield (NZL)
Martin Madden (SCO)

6 October 2010
08:30

Australia	9–0	Scotland
Doerner 14', 38', 60'; Ciriello 16', 26'; Hammond 24'; Mitton 33'; Orchard 54'; Abbott 56'	Report

Umpires:
Andrew Kennedy (ENG)
Albert Marcano (TRI)

6 October 2010
20:30

Pakistan	4–1	Malaysia
Imran 17'; Abbasi 38'; Butt 43'; Waqas 65'	Report	Rahim 32'

Umpires:
Peter Wright (RSA)
Gareth Greenfield (NZL)

7 October 2010
16:00

India	2–5	Australia
Singh 12'; Sandeep 70+'	Report	Abbott 2'; Mitton 6'; Ockenden 48' de Young 54'; Turner 58'

Umpires:
Nathan Stagno (GIB)
Andrew Kennedy (ENG)

8 October 2010
20:30

Malaysia	2–0	Scotland
Misron 34'; Hanafi 52'	Report

Umpires:
Richmond Attipoe (GHA)
Albert Marcano (TRI)

9 October 2010
10:30

Pakistan	0–1	Australia
	Report	Ciriello 33'

Umpires:
Richmond Attipoe (GHA)
Martin Madden (SCO)

9 October 2010
19:00

Scotland	0–4	India
	Report	Saravanjit 7'; Dharamvir 12', 61'; Mahadik 51'

Umpires:
Albert Marcano (TRI)
Tim Pullman (AUS)

10 October 2010
16:30

Australia	7–0	Malaysia
Doerner 5', 16', 47'; Orchard 11'; Turner 21'; Ciriello 45'; Ockenden 55'	Report

Umpires:
John Hrytsak (CAN)
Peter Wright (RSA)

10 October 2010
19:00

Pakistan	4–7	India
Imran 27'; Rizwan 29'; Irfan 58'; Abbasi 68'	Report	Sandeep 3', 11'; Shivendra 19', 59'; Saravanjit 20'; Mujtaba 41'; Dharamvir 45'

Umpires:
Tim Pullman (AUS)
Nathan Stagno (GIB)

==== Pool B ====
Pos	Team	Pld	W	D	L	GF	GA	GD	Pts	Qualification
1	England	4	3	1	0	12	5	+7	10	Semi-finals
2	New Zealand	4	2	1	1	15	9	+6	7	Semi-finals
3	South Africa	4	2	0	2	12	10	+2	6	
4	Canada	4	1	2	1	5	6	−1	5	
5	Trinidad and Tobago	4	0	0	4	4	18	−14	0	

Source: The CGF
Rules for classification: 1) points; 2) goal difference; 3) goals scored; 4) head-to-head result.

5 October 2010
14:00

New Zealand	7–1	Trinidad and Tobago
Hayward 11', 47'; Inglis 20'; Hilton 30', 49'; Shaw 38'; Haig 65'	Report	Legerton 19'

Umpires:
Tim Pullman (AUS)
Haider Rasool (PAK)

5 October 2010
16:30

Canada	1–4	South Africa
Singh 28'	Report	Carr 14'; Reid-Ross 35', 57'; Haley 69'

Umpires:
Satinder Kumar (IND)
Will Drury (WAL)

6 October 2010
15:30

England	4–0	Trinidad and Tobago
S. Mantell 9', 19'; Jackson 39'; Brogdon 58'	Report

Umpires:
John Hrytsak (CAN)
Richmond Attipoe (GHA)

6 October 2010
18:30

New Zealand	4–2	South Africa
Shaw 8'; Burrows 9'; Jenness 16'; Wilson 31'	Report	Norris-Jones 15'; Reid-Ross 64'

Umpires:
Tim Pullman (AUS)
Martin Madden (SCO)

7 October 2010
18:00

England	1–1	Canada
S. Mantell 50'	Report	Smythe 13'

Umpires:
Haider Rasool (PAK)
Will Drury (WAL)

8 October 2010
15:30

South Africa	5–3	Trinidad and Tobago
Carr 5', 50'; Louw 17'; Reid-Ross 38'; Paton 70'	Report	Browne 10'; Legerton 31', 52'

Umpires:
John Hrytsak (CAN)
Satinder Kumar (IND)

9 October 2010
08:30

England	5–3	New Zealand
Tindall 7', 23', 65'; R. Mantell 30'; Moore 48'	Report	Burrows 9'; Shaw 34', 53'

Umpires:
Peter Wright (RSA)
Satinder Kumar (IND)

9 October 2010
16:00

Canada	2–0	Trinidad and Tobago
Tupper 10', 27'	Report

Umpires:
Haider Rasool (PAK)
Will Drury (WAL)

10 October 2010
12:00

England	2–1	South Africa
Jackson 8'; Tindall 66'	Report	Paton 45'

Umpires:
Gareth Greenfield (NZL)
Martin Madden (SCO)

10 October 2010
14:00

New Zealand	1–1	Canada
Shaw 68'	Report	Singh 19'

Umpires:
Andrew Kennedy (ENG)
Haider Rasool (PAK)

=== Fifth to tenth place classification ===
==== Ninth and tenth place ====
12 October 2010
08:30

Scotland	7–0	Trinidad and Tobago
Fraser 13'; Stott 15'; Nelson 39'; Marshall 43'; Bain 47', 63'; Forsyth 52'	Report

Umpires:
Will Drury (WAL)
John Hrytsak (CAN)

==== Seventh and eighth place ====
12 October 2010
20:00

Malaysia	2–3 (a.e.t.)	Canada
Rahim 16'; Hanafi 35+'	Report	Pearson 9'; Smythe 23'; Watson 76'

Umpires:
Albert Marcano (TRI)
Haider Rasool (PAK)

==== Fifth and sixth place ====
12 October 2010
13:30

Pakistan	2–3 (a.e.t.)	South Africa
Butt 28', 53'	Report	Reid-Ross 55', 75'; Carr 62'

Umpires:
Andrew Kennedy (ENG)
Gareth Greenfield (NZL)

=== First to fourth place classification ===
Semi-finals
12 October 2010
Australia	6
New Zealand	2
12 October 2010
England	3 (4)
India	3 (5)

Final
14 October 2010
Australia	8
India	0
Third place
14 October 2010
New Zealand	3 (5)
England	3 (3)

==== Semi-finals ====
12 October 2010
11:00

Australia	6–2	New Zealand
Orchard 25', 70'; Turner 28', 67'; Wilson 31'; Abbott 43'	Report	Hilton 51'; Burrows 60'

Umpires:
Martin Madden (SCO)
Satinder Kumar (IND)

12 October 2010
17:30

England	3–3 (a.e.t.)	India
Jackson 35+', 41'; S. Mantell 45'	Report	Saravanjit 20', 60'; Pillay 56'
Penalties
Smith (penalty shoot-out scored); R. Mantell (penalty shoot-out scored); Kirkham (penalty shoot-out missed); Jackson (penalty shoot-out scored); S. Mantell (penalty shoot-out scored)	4–5	(penalty shoot-out scored) Saravanjit; (penalty shoot-out scored) Pillay; (penalty shoot-out scored) Sandeep; (penalty shoot-out scored) Halappa; (penalty shoot-out scored) Shivendra

Umpires:
Tim Pullman (AUS)
Nathan Stagno (GIB)

==== Bronze medal match ====
14 October 2010
09:00

New Zealand	3–3 (a.e.t.)	England
Couzins 8'; Haig 15'; Shaw 37'	Report	S. Mantell 25', 57', 61'
Penalties
Couzins (penalty shoot-out scored); Burrows (penalty shoot-out scored); Shaw (penalty shoot-out scored); Hayward (penalty shoot-out scored); McAleese (penalty shoot-out scored)	5–3	(penalty shoot-out scored) Smith; (penalty shoot-out scored) R. Mantell; (penalty shoot-out missed) Dixon; (penalty shoot-out scored) Jackson

Umpires:
Richmond Attipoe (GHA)
Satinder Kumar (IND)

==== Gold medal match ====
14 October 2010
11:30

Australia	8–0	India
Wilson 19', 28'; Ciriello 21'; Doerner 34', 52'; Orchard 60'; Dwyer 66'; Turner 70'	Report

Umpires:
Peter Wright (RSA)
Nathan Stagno (GIB)

== Final standings ==
As per statistical convention in field hockey, matches decided in extra time are counted as wins and losses, while matches decided by penalty shoot-outs are counted as draws.

Pos	Team	Pld	W	D	L	GF	GA	GD	Pts	Final result
1st place, gold medalist(s)	Australia	6	6	0	0	36	4	+32	18	Gold Medal
2nd place, silver medalist(s)	India (H)	6	3	1	2	19	22	−3	10	Silver Medal
3rd place, bronze medalist(s)	New Zealand	6	2	2	2	20	18	+2	8	Bronze Medal
4	England	6	3	3	0	18	11	+7	12	
5	South Africa	5	3	0	2	15	12	+3	9	
6	Pakistan	5	2	0	3	13	12	+1	6	
7	Canada	5	2	2	1	8	8	0	8	
8	Malaysia	5	1	0	4	7	17	−10	3	
9	Scotland	5	1	0	4	7	18	−11	3	
10	Trinidad and Tobago	5	0	0	5	4	25	−21	0	

Source: The CGF
(H) Hosts

== Goalscorers ==
There were 147 goals scored in 27 matches, for an average of 5.44 goals per match.

8 goals

- (Australia) Luke Doerner

7 goals

- (England) Simon Mantell

6 goals

- (New Zealand) Hayden Shaw
- (South Africa) Justin Reid-Ross

5 goals

- (Australia) Christopher Ciriello
- (Australia) Simon Orchard
- (Australia) Glenn Turner

4 goals

- (England) James Tindall
- (England) Ashley Jackson
- (India) Dharamvir Singh
- (India) Sandeep Singh
- (India) Sarvanjit Singh
- (Pakistan) Rehan Butt
- (South Africa) Gareth Carr

3 goals

- (Australia) Desmond Abbott
- (Australia) Jason Wilson
- (Malaysia) Hafifi Hafiz
- (New Zealand) Phillip Burrows
- (New Zealand) Blair Hilton
- (Pakistan) Shakeel Abbasi
- (Pakistan) Muhammad Imran
- (Trinidad and Tobago) Wayne Legerton

2 goals

- (Australia) Trent Mitton
- (Australia) Edward Ockenden
- (Canada) Sukhwinder Singh
- (Canada) Iain Smythe
- (Canada) Scott Tupper
- (India) Dhananjay Mahadik
- (India) Shivendra Singh
- (Malaysia) Azlan Misron
- (Malaysia) Amin Rahim
- (New Zealand) Nicholas Haig
- (New Zealand) Andrew Hayward
- (Scotland) Kenneth Bain
- (South Africa) Taine Paton

1 goal

- (Australia) Jamie Dwyer
- (Australia) Robert Hammond
- (Australia) Liam de Young
- (Canada) Mark Pearson
- (Canada) Jesse Watson
- (England) Alastair Brogdon
- (England) Richard Mantell
- (England) Robert Moore
- (India) Bharat Chhikara
- (India) Danish Mujtaba
- (India) Dhanraj Pillay
- (New Zealand) Dean Couzins
- (New Zealand) Hugo Inglis
- (New Zealand) Stephen Jenness
- (New Zealand) Nicholas Wilson
- (Pakistan) Muhammad Irfan
- (Pakistan) Muhammad Rizwan Sr.
- (Pakistan) Muhammad Waqas
- (Scotland) Alan Forsyth
- (Scotland) Cameron Fraser
- (Scotland) William Marshall
- (Scotland) Christopher Nelson
- (Scotland) Niall Stott
- (South Africa) Ian Haley
- (South Africa) Lance Louw
- (South Africa) Lloyd Norris-Jones
- (Trinidad and Tobago) Kwandwane Browne
