= Gordon McIntyre (field hockey) =

Scottish field hockey player

Personal information
- Born: 15 November 1989 (age 36) Greenock, Scotland
- Height: 1.76 m (5 ft 9 in)
- Weight: 76 kg (168 lb)

Sport
- Sport: Field hockey
- Position: Midfield
Senior career
Years	Team	Caps	Goals
2008–2011	Kelburne	-	-
2011–2015	Beeston	-	-
2016–2022	Wimbledon	-	-
2023–2025	Spencer	-	-
National team
Years	Team	Caps	Goals
2013–2018	Scotland	95	(6)
2014–2015	Great Britain	5	(2)
Medal record
Representing Scotland
European Championship II
Bronze medal – third place	2011 Vinnytsia	Team
Bronze medal – third place	2015 Prague	Team
Gold medal – first place	2017 Glasgow	Team

Gordon McIntyre (15 November 1989) is a Scottish international field hockey player who plays for Scotland and Great Britain.

== Biography ==
McIntyre played club hockey for Greencock before joining Kelburne. While at Kelburne, McIntyre competed for Scotland at the 2010 Commonwealth Games in Delhi and won a bronze medal with the team at the 2011 Men's EuroHockey Championship II in Vinnytsia, Ukraine.

In 2011, McIntyre moved to England to play for Beeston in the Men's England Hockey League. While at Beeston, he represented Scotland in the 2014 Commonwealth Games in Glasgow and made his Great Britain international debut on 17 October 2014. He also won a bronze medal with Scotland at the 2015 Men's EuroHockey Championship II in Prague.

He left Beeston to join Wimbledon Hockey Club and won a gold medal with Scotland at the 2017 Men's EuroHockey Championship II in Glasgow.

McIntyre was selected to represent Scotland at the 2018 Commonwealth Games in Gold Coast.

In 2023, he joined Spencer Hockey Club.
