= West District Men's Hockey Divisions =

West District Men's Division 1
- Founded: 1954
- First season: 1954-55
- Administrator: West District Hockey
- No. of teams: 10
- Country: Scotland
- Most recent champion: Western Wildcats Hockey Club
- Most titles: Western Wildcats Hockey Club (24 titles)
- Tournament format: Round Robin League

West District Hockey currently runs four men's outdoor divisions and two men's indoor divisions. The leagues are run by the West District committee. The season runs from September to April, with indoor running from December to February. The leagues were formed in 1954 after the Scottish Hockey Association agreed to allow competitive hockey in the districts. Thirteen teams competed in the inaugural season, with Stepps winning overall. The South-West District had its first competitive league in 1957-58, with nine teams competing. The two districts merged in 1975-76.

== Competition format ==
Teams receive three points for a win and one point for a draw. No points are awarded for a loss. Teams are ranked by total points, then goal difference, and then goals scored. At the end of each season, the club with the most points are crowned league champion.

== Promotion and Relegation ==
The top two teams in each division gain automatic promotion to the higher division, swapping places with the bottom two sides from that division, who are automatically relegated. The winner of division 1 is declared the West District Champion. If a team wishes to progress further, they can apply for entry into the National League or the Regional League if they already have a 1st team in the National League.

== Current Teams (outdoor) ==
=== West District Division 1 ===
Division 1 is the top of the West District of men's field hockey in Scotland. The winners are crowned as West District Hockey champions. The teams finishing in the bottom two are automatically relegated to division 2.

The 10 clubs listed below will compete in division 1 during the 2024–25 season.

Club	Location	Position in 2023–24	First season in top division	No. of seasons in top division	First season of current spell in top division	No. of seasons of current spell	West District Division titles	Last title
Clydesdale 3rd XI	Glasgow	3rd	1954-55 (Note: as Cartha Hockey Club)	56	2014-15	9	8 (Note: Includes 1st & 2nd XI)	2016-17
Giffnock	Giffnock	5th	1980-91 (Note: as Whitecraigs Hockey Club)	15	2023-24	1	0	—
Helensburgh	Helensburgh	8th	1976-75	29	2018-19	5	0	—
Hillhead 3rd XI	Hillhead	4th	1982-83	26 (Note: Includes 1st & 2nd XI)	2021-22	3	4	2021-22
Hillhead 4th XI	Hillhead	6th	2006-07	7	2023-24	1	0	—
Kelburne 3rd XI	Paisley	1st, Division 2	1978-79	45	2024-25	0	15 (Note: Includes 1st, 2nd & 4th XI)	2007-08
Rottenrow	Glasgow	2nd	2012-13	9 (Note: Includes 2nd XI)	2018-19	5	2 (Note: Includes 2nd XI)	2012-13
Uddingston 3rd XI	Uddingston	7th)	1954-55 (Note: As Bellshill Hockey Club)	47 (Note: Includes 1st & 2nd XI)	2014-15	8	3	2022-23
Western 3rd XI	Milngavie	1st (champions)	1954-55	69 (Note: Includes 1st and 2nd XI)	2013-14	10	24 (Note: Includes 1st and 2nd XI)	2023-24
Western 4th XI	Milngavie	2nd, division 2	1999-00	9	2024-25	0	0	—

West District Men's Division 2
- First season: 1957-58
- Administrator: West District Hockey
- No. of teams: 10
- Country: Scotland
- Most recent champion: Kelburne 3rd XI
- Most titles: Kelburne (6 titles)
- Tournament format: Round Robin League

=== West District Division 2 ===
Division 2 is the second tier of the West District of men's field hockey in Scotland. The winners are promoted to division 1 along with the runners up. The teams finishing in the bottom two are automatically relegated to division 3.

The 10 clubs listed below will compete in division 2 during the 2023–24 season.

Club	Location	Position in 2023–24	First season in second division	No. of seasons in second division	First season of current spell in second division	No. of seasons of current spell	West District Division 2 titles	Last title
Ayr	Ayr	3rd	1979-80	18	2022-23	2	1	2014-15
Clydesdale 4th XI	Glasgow	5th	2005-06	9	2018-19	5	1	2010-11
Dumfries	Dumfries	10th, division 1	1977-78 (Note: as Crichton Royal Hockey Club)	12	2024-25	0	2	2001-02
Glasgow High Kelvinside (Note: Merger of Cochane Park and Clydebank TC)	Glasgow	9th, division 1	1967-68 (Note: as Clydebank TC Hockey Club)	14	2024-25	0	4 (Note: Includes Clydebank TC & Cochrane Park titles)	2021-22
Glasgow University 3rd XI	Glasgow	6th	2010-11	10	2023-24	1	0	—
Greenock 2nd XI	Greenock	2nd, Division 3	1981-82 (Note: Includes 1st XI)	11	2024-25	0	1	1992-93
Hillhead 5th A XI	Hillhead	4th	2008-09	10	2023-24	1	0	—
Hillhead 5th B XI	Hillhead	4th	2008-09	10	2023-24	1	0	—
Rottenrow 2nd XI	Glasgow	8th	2013-14	7	2017-18	6	1	2013-14
Uddingston 4th XI	Uddingston	7th	2014-15	9	2014-15	9	0	—

West District Men's Division 3
- First season: 1957-58
- Administrator: West District Hockey
- No. of teams: 7
- Country: Scotland
- Most recent champion: Hillhead Hockey Club 6th XI
- Most titles: Hillhead/Uddingston/Western (4 titles)
- Tournament format: Round Robin League

=== West District Division 3 ===
Division 3 is the third tier of the West District of men's field hockey in Scotland. The winners are promoted to division 2 along with the runners up. The teams finishing bottom are automatically relegated to division 4.

The 7 clubs listed below will compete in division 3 during the 2023–24 season.

Club	Location	Position in 2022–23	First season in third division	No. of seasons in third division	First season of current spell in third division	No. of seasons of current spell	West District Division 3 titles	Last title
Anchor	Linwood	4th	2017-18	3	2023-24	1	1	2018-19
Helensburgh 2nd XI	Helensburgh	9th, division 2	1989-90	18	2024-25	0	1	2022-23
Hillhead 6th XI	Hillhead	1st	2002-03	17	2023-24	1	1	2023-24
Kelburne 4th XI	Paisley	3rd	1988-89	5	2021-22	3	1	1989-90
Strathclyde University 2nd XI	Glasgow	5th	1996-97	2	2023-24	1	0	—
Uddingston 5th XI	Uddingston	6th	2014-15	9	2014-15	9	0	—
Western 5th XI	Milngavie	2nd, division 4	1997-98	11	2024-25	0	0	—

West District Men's Division 4
- First season: 1980-81
- Administrator: West District Hockey
- No. of teams: 6
- Country: Scotland
- Most recent champion: Clydesdale 5th XI
- Most titles: Hillhead (5 titles)
- Tournament format: Round Robin League

=== West District Division 4 ===
Division 4 is the fourth and bottom tier of the West District of men's field hockey in Scotland. The winners are promoted to division 3. There is no relegation from division 4.

The 6 clubs listed below will compete in division 4 during the 2023–24 season.

Club	Location	Position in 2022–23	First season in third division	No. of seasons in third division	First season of current spell in third division	No. of seasons of current spell	West District Division 4 titles	Last title
Clydesdale 5th XI	Glasgow	1st	1992-93	13	2022-23	2	2	2023-24
Dumfries 2nd XI	Dumfries	5th	1993-94	4	2023-24	1	0	—
Dumfries 3rd XI	Dumfries	—	2024-25	0	2024-25	0	0	—
Giffnock 2nd XI	Giffnock	4th	2022-23	2	2022-23	2	0	—
Helensburgh 3rd XI	Helensburgh	6th	2005-06	11	2022-23	2	0	—
Hillhead 7th XI	Hillhead	3rd	2006-07	7	2022-23	2	0	—
Hillhead 8th XI	Hillhead	—	2024-25	0	2024-25	0	0	—

=== Past winners ===
See List of Men's West District hockey champions for further information

== Current Teams (indoor) ==
West District Indoor Hockey runs from December to February, at the Lagoon Leisure Centre in Paisley. Ten teams compete for the title over two leagues.
