= Chris Grassick =

Scottish field hockey player

Personal information
- Born: 3 November 1990 (age 35) Edinburgh, Scotland
- Height: 1.77 m (5 ft 10 in)
- Weight: 80 kg (176 lb)

Sport
- Sport: Field hockey
- Position: Midfielder
Senior career
Years	Team	Caps	Goals
2008–2010	Inverleith	-	-
2010–2019	Surbiton	-	-
National team
Years	Team	Caps	Goals
2008–2018	Scotland	110	(19)
2011-2019	Great Britain	25	(4)
Medal record
Representing Scotland
European Championship II
Bronze medal – third place	2011 Vinnytsia	Team
Bronze medal – third place	2015 Prague	Team
Gold medal – first place	2017 Glasgow	Team

Christopher Douglas John Grassick (born 3 November 1990) is a Scottish retired international field hockey player who played as a midfielder for Scotland and Great Britain.

== Biography ==
Grassick, born in Edinburgh, Scotland, played club hockey Inverleith Hockey Club until joining Surbiton in the Men's England Hockey League Premier Division. He won a bronze medal with the Scotland team at the 2011 Men's EuroHockey Championship II in Vinnytsia, Ukraine.

He made his Great Britain debut on 5 March 2014 and captained the Scotland squad that competed at the 2014 Commonwealth Games in Glasgow. He won a bronze medal with Scotland at the 2015 Men's EuroHockey Championship II in Prague and won a gold medal with Scotland at the 2017 Men's EuroHockey Championship II in Glasgow.

In 2018, Grassick went to his second Commonwealth Games after being selected to represent Scotland at the 2018 Commonwealth Games in Gold Coast.

Grassick announced his retirement from playing hockey, due to injury, on 27 September 2019.
