= 2009 Men's EuroHockey Nations Challenge I =

Field hockey tournament

Tournament details
- Host country: Croatia
- City: Zagreb
- Dates: 25–31 July
- Teams: 7 (from 1 confederation)

Final positions
- Champions: Ukraine (2nd title)
- Runner-up: Sweden
- Third place: Portugal

Tournament statistics
- Matches played: 15
- Goals scored: 81 (5.4 per match)

The 2009 Men's EuroHockey Nations Challenge I was the third edition of the Men's EuroHockey Nations Challenge I, the third level of the European field hockey Championships organized by the European Hockey Federation. It was held from 25 to 31 July 2009 in Zagreb, Croatia.

The tournament also served as a qualifier for the 2011 Men's EuroHockey Championship II, with the finalists, Ukraine and Sweden, qualifying.

The 15 games in the tournament witnessed 81 goals being scored.

== Qualified teams ==
The following seven teams, shown with pre-tournament world rankings, competed in the tournament.

Dates	Event	Location	Quotas	Qualifiers
9—12 September 2007	2007 EuroHockey Nations Trophy	Lisbon, Portugal	2	Ukraine (33); Portugal (26)
9–15 September 2007	2007 EuroHockey Challenge I	Kazan, Russia	4	Sweden (40); Azerbaijan (44); Croatia (48); Denmark (51)
9–15 September 2007	2007 EuroHockey Challenge II	Predanovci, Slovenia	1	Slovenia (50)
Total			7	

== Results ==
All times are local (UTC+2).

=== Preliminary round ===
==== Pool A ====
Pos	Team	Pld	W	D	L	GF	GA	GD	Pts	Qualification
1	Azerbaijan	2	1	1	0	5	2	+3	4	Semi-finals
2	Portugal	2	1	1	0	5	3	+2	4	Semi-finals
3	Denmark	2	0	0	2	5	10	−5	0	Pool C

Source: TheSports.org

25 July 2009

Portugal	5–3	Denmark

26 July 2009

Azerbaijan	0–0	Portugal

28 July 2009

Denmark	2–5	Azerbaijan

==== Pool B ====
Pos	Team	Pld	W	D	L	GF	GA	GD	Pts	Qualification
1	Ukraine	3	3	0	0	11	0	+11	9	Semi-finals
2	Sweden	3	2	0	1	12	3	+9	6	Semi-finals
3	Croatia (H)	3	0	1	2	3	9	−6	1	Pool C
4	Slovenia	3	0	1	2	2	16	−14	1	Pool C

Source: TheSports.org
(H) Hosts

25 July 2009

Ukraine	2–0	Sweden

25 July 2009

Croatia	2–2	Slovenia

26 July 2009

Sweden	8–0	Slovenia

26 July 2009

Croatia	0–3	Ukraine

28 July 2009

Ukraine	6–0	Slovenia

28 July 2009

Sweden	4–1	Croatia

=== Fifth to seventh place classification ===
==== Pool C ====
The points obtained in the preliminary round against the other team are taken over.

Pos	Team	Pld	W	D	L	GF	GA	GD	Pts
5	Croatia (H)	2	1	1	0	7	6	+1	4
6	Slovenia	2	1	1	0	6	5	+1	4
7	Denmark	2	0	0	2	7	9	−2	0

Source: TheSports.org
(H) Hosts

30 July 2009

Denmark	3–4	Slovenia

31 July 2009

Denmark	4–5	Croatia

=== First to fourth place classification ===
Semi-finals
30 July
Azerbaijan	4 (3)
Sweden (p.s.o.)	4 (4)
30 July
Portugal	1
Ukraine	7

Final
30 July
Sweden	0
Ukraine	3
Third place
30 July
Azerbaijan	1
Portugal	2

==== Semi-finals ====
30 July 2009

Azerbaijan	4–4 (a.e.t.)	Sweden
Penalties
	3–4

30 July 2009

Portugal	1–7	Ukraine

==== Third place game ====
31 July 2009

Azerbaijan	1–2	Portugal

==== Final ====
31 July 2009

Sweden	0–3	Ukraine

== Final standings ==
Rank	Team
Gold medal	Ukraine
Silver medal	Sweden
Bronze medal	Portugal
4	Azerbaijan
5	Croatia
6	Slovenia
7	Denmark

Promoted to the EuroHockey Championship II

== See also ==
- 2009 Men's EuroHockey Nations Challenge II
- 2009 Men's EuroHockey Nations Trophy
