= Jonathan Christie =

Scottish field hockey player

Personal information
- Born: 9 July 1983 (age 43) Glasgow, Scotland

Sport
- Sport: Field hockey
- Position: Forward
Senior career
Years	Team	Caps	Goals
1998–2020	Kelburne	-	-
2021–2023	Western Wildcats	-	-
National team
Years	Team	Caps	Goals
2002–	Scotland	75	-

Jonathan Christie (born 9 July 1983) is a former field hockey player who represented Scotland at the 2006 Commonwealth Games.

== Biography ==
Christie was educated at Paisley Grammar School and while at school played for Kelburne Hockey Club in the Scottish National Leagues and represented Scotland at U16 level. In 1999, he won an annual award given by the Scottish National Playing Fields Association. In 2001 he participated in the Junior World Cup the Scotland U21 team and was a full senior international the following year.

Christie as a forward, where he also captained the Kelburne team. Christie was part of the Scotland Commonwealth Games team at the 2006 Commonwealth Games in Melbourne and played in the Euro Hockey League 2007-08 for Kelburne HC.

In 2022, Christie playing for the Western Wildcats Hockey Club, won his 14th men's Scottish league hockey title at the age of 38.

== Family ==
His younger brother Michael was also a member of Scotland's men's team.
