= Mark Ralph =

Mark Ralph may refer to:

- Mark Ralph (field hockey) (born 1980), Scottish field hockey midfield player
- Mark Ralph (record producer) (born 1974), British record producer
