= José Borrell =

José Borrell may refer to:

- Josep Borrell (born 1947), Spanish politician,
- José Borrell (field hockey) (born 1953), Spanish field hockey player
