= 2007 Men's EuroHockey Nations Challenge II =

Field hockey tournament

Tournament details
- Host country: Slovenia
- City: Predanovci
- Dates: 9–15 September
- Teams: 7 (from 1 confederation)

Final positions
- Champions: Slovenia (1st title)
- Runner-up: Turkey
- Third place: Serbia

Tournament statistics
- Matches played: 15
- Goals scored: 71 (4.73 per match)

The 2007 Men's EuroHockey Nations Challenge II was the second edition of the EuroHockey Nations Challenge II, the fourth level of the men's European field hockey championships organized by the European Hockey Federation. It was held from 9 to 15 September 2007 in Predanovci, Slovenia.

The hosts Slovenia won their first EuroHockey Nations Challenge II title and were promoted to EuroHockey Nations Challenge I.

== Results ==
All times are local, CEST (UTC+1).

=== Preliminary round ===
==== Pool A ====
Pos	Team	Pld	W	D	L	GF	GA	GD	Pts	Qualification
1	Turkey	2	1	1	0	6	3	+3	4	Semi-finals
2	Serbia	2	1	1	0	6	4	+2	4	Semi-finals
3	Bulgaria	2	0	0	2	1	6	−5	0	Pool C

Source: TheSports.org

10 September 2007
13:00

Turkey	3–0	Bulgaria

11 September 2007
13:00

Turkey	3–3	Serbia

12 September 2007
13:00

Bulgaria	1–3	Serbia

==== Pool B ====
Pos	Team	Pld	W	D	L	GF	GA	GD	Pts	Qualification
1	Slovenia (H)	3	2	1	0	15	3	+12	7	Semi-finals
2	Lithuania	3	2	1	0	7	4	+3	7	Semi-finals
3	Slovakia	3	1	0	2	3	6	−3	3	Pool C
4	Finland	3	0	0	3	1	13	−12	0	Pool C

Source: TheSports.org
(H) Hosts

9 September 2007
13:00

Finland	1–3	Lithuania

9 September 2007
17:00

Slovenia	4–1	Slovakia

11 September 2007
15:00

Finland	0–1	Slovakia

11 September 2007
17:00

Slovenia	2–2	Lithuania

12 September 2007
15:00

Slovakia	1–2	Lithuania

12 September 2007
17:00

Finland	0–9	Slovenia

=== Fifth to seventh place classification ===
==== Pool C ====
The points obtained in the preliminary round from the two teams in pool B against each other are taken over.

Pos	Team	Pld	W	D	L	GF	GA	GD	Pts
5	Slovakia	2	2	0	0	4	2	+2	6
6	Bulgaria	2	1	0	1	6	3	+3	3
7	Finland	2	0	0	2	0	5	−5	0

Source: TheSports.org

14 September 2007
12:30

Bulgaria	4–0	Finland

15 September 2007
12:30

Bulgaria	2–3	Slovakia

=== First to fourth place classification ===
Semi-finals
14 September
Serbia	0
Slovenia	6
14 September
Turkey (a.e.t.)	3
Lithuania	2

Final
15 September
Slovenia	5
Turkey	0
Third place
15 September
Serbia	6
Lithuania	1

==== Semi-finals ====
14 September 2007
14:30

Serbia	0–6	Slovenia

14 September 2007
17:00

Turkey	3–2 (a.e.t.)	Lithuania

==== Third place game ====
15 September 2007
15:00

Serbia	6–1	Lithuania

==== Final ====
15 September 2007
17:30

Slovenia	5–0	Turkey

== Final standings ==
Rank	Team
1st place, gold medalist(s)	Slovenia
2nd place, silver medalist(s)	Turkey
3rd place, bronze medalist(s)	Serbia
4	Lithuania
5	Slovakia
6	Bulgaria
7	Finland

Promoted to the EuroHockey Nations Challenge I

== See also ==
- 2007 Men's EuroHockey Nations Challenge I
