= Chris Nelson (field hockey) =

Scottish field hockey player (born 1984)

Personal information
- Born: 27 September 1984 (age 41)

Sport
- Sport: Field hockey
- Position: Midfield
Senior career
Years	Team	Caps	Goals
2006–2021	Kelburne	-	-
National team
Years	Team	Caps	Goals
2008–2014	Scotland	131	-
Medal record
Representing Scotland
European Championship II
Bronze medal – third place	2011 Vinnytsia	Team

Christopher Nelson (born 27 September 1984) is a Scottish former field hockey player who represented the Scotland men's national field hockey team at two Commonwealth Games.

== Biography ==
Nelson studied at Glasgow Caledonian University and played club hockey for Kelburne Hockey Club in the Scottish Hockey Premiership.

He was "left heartbroken" when he missed out on a place at the 2006 Commonwealth Games but continued to play for Scotland and Kelburne and was selected for the Scottish team at the 2010 Commonwealth Games in Delhi. He subsequently played and captained the teamduring the men's tournament. The following year he won a bronze medal with the Scotland team at the 2011 Men's EuroHockey Championship II in Vinnytsia, Ukraine.

He participated in his second Commonwealth Games after being selected as a member of Team Scotland for the men's tournament at the 2014 Commonwealth Games in Glasgow.

Nelson retired from international hockey in November 2014.

In 2018 he became the Director of Hockey at Kelburne.
