= 1999 Men's EuroHockey Nations Championship qualification =

Field hockey tournament

Tournament details
- Dates: 5–12 July 1998
- Teams: 17 (from 1 confederation)
- Venue: 3 (in 3 host cities)

Tournament statistics
- Matches played: 35
- Goals scored: 226 (6.46 per match)

The 1999 Men's EuroHockey Nations Championship qualification was the sixth edition of the qualifying round for the Men's EuroHockey Nations Championship. It took place from 5 to 12 July 1998 in three different venues with 17 teams playing for five quotas at the 1999 European Championship.

== Dundee ==
Dundee
Tournament details
- Host country: Scotland
- City: Dundee
- Dates: 5–11 July 1998
- Teams: 5 (from 1 confederation)

Final positions
- Champions: Russia
- Runner-up: Switzerland
- Third place: Scotland

Tournament statistics
- Matches played: 10
- Goals scored: 52 (5.2 per match)

The first qualifying tournament was played in Dundee, Scotland from 6 to 11 July 1998 with five teams participating.

=== Standings ===
Pos	Team	Pld	W	D	L	GF	GA	GD	Pts	Qualification
1	Russia	4	3	1	0	21	4	+17	10	1999 European Championship
2	Switzerland	4	3	1	0	12	3	+9	10	1999 European Championship
3	Scotland (H)	4	2	0	2	8	5	+3	6	
4	Denmark	4	1	0	3	9	13	−4	3	
5	Ukraine	4	0	0	4	2	27	−25	0	

Source: Todor66
(H) Hosts

=== Results ===
5 July 1998
12:00

Russia	10–0	Ukraine

5 July 1998
17:00

Switzerland	2–0	Denmark

6 July 1998
13:30

Ukraine	0–4	Scotland

6 July 1998
16:00

Switzerland	2–2	Russia

8 July 1998
12:30

Denmark	7–1	Ukraine

8 July 1998
15:00

Scotland	1–2	Russia

10 July 1998
12:30

Ukraine	1–6	Switzerland

10 July 1998
15:00

Denmark	7–1	Denmark

11 July 1998
14:00

Russia	7–1	Denmark

11 July 1998
16:00

Switzerland	2–0	Scotland

== Alicante ==
Alicante
Tournament details
- Host country: Spain
- City: Alicante
- Dates: 6–12 July 1998
- Teams: 8 (from 1 confederation)

Final positions
- Champions: Spain
- Runner-up: France
- Third place: Belarus

Tournament statistics
- Matches played: 19
- Goals scored: 103 (5.42 per match)

The second qualifying tournament was played in Alicante, Spain from 6 to 12 July 1998 with eighth teams participating.

=== Preliminary round ===
==== Pool A ====
Pos	Team	Pld	W	D	L	GF	GA	GD	Pts	Qualification
1	Spain (H)	3	2	1	0	14	4	+10	7	Semi-finals
2	Sweden	3	2	1	0	8	4	+4	7	Semi-finals
3	Austria	3	1	0	2	12	8	+4	3	
4	Malta	3	0	0	3	0	18	−18	0	

Source: Todor66
(H) Hosts

6 July 1998
17:30

Austria	2–4	Sweden

6 July 1998
19:30

Spain	8–0	Malta

8 July 1998
17:30

Malta	0–8	Austria

8 July 1998
19:30

Spain	2–2	Sweden

9 July 1998
17:30

Malta	0–2	Sweden

9 July 1998
19:30

Austria	2–4	Spain

==== Pool B ====
Pos	Team	Pld	W	D	L	GF	GA	GD	Pts	Qualification
1	France	3	2	1	0	16	3	+13	7	Semi-finals
2	Belarus	3	2	1	0	9	2	+7	7	Semi-finals
3	Portugal	3	1	0	2	5	9	−4	3	
4	Azerbaijan	3	0	0	3	0	16	−16	0	

Source: Todor66

6 July 1998
10:00

Portugal	1–5	Belarus

6 July 1998
12:00

France	11–0	Azerbaijan

7 July 1998
17:30

Azerbaijan	0–3	Belarus

7 July 1998
19:30

France	4–2	Portugal

9 July 1998
10:00

Portugal	2–0	Azerbaijan

9 July 1998
12:00

Belarus	1–1	France

=== Fifth to eighth place classification ===
5–8th place semi-finals
11 July
Portugal	3
Malta	0
11 July
Austria	3
Azerbaijan	2

Fifth place
12 July
Portugal	2
Austria	3
Seventh place
12 July
Malta	w/o
Azerbaijan

==== 5–8th place semi-finals ====
11 July 1998
16:30

Portugal	3–0	Malta

11 July 1998
19:00

Austria	3–2	Azerbaijan

==== Seventh place game ====
12 July 1998
17:00

Malta	w/o	Azerbaijan

==== Fifth place game ====
12 July 1998
19:30

Portugal	2–3	Austria

=== First to fourth place classification ===
Semi-finals
11 July
France	1
Sweden	0
11 July
Spain	9
Belarus	1

Final
12 July
France	0
Spain	8
Third place
12 July
Sweden	2
Belarus	5

==== Semi-finals ====
11 July 1998
09:30

France	1–0	Sweden

11 July 1998
12:00

Spain	9–1	Belarus

==== Third place game ====
12 July 1998
09:30

Sweden	2–5	Belarus

==== Final ====
12 July 1998
12:00

France	0–8	Spain

=== Final standings ===
Pos	Team	Qualification
1	Spain (H)	1999 European Championship
2	France	1999 European Championship
3	Belarus	
4	Sweden	
5	Austria	
6	Portugal	
7	Malta	
8	Azerbaijan	

(H) Host.

== Prague ==
Prague
Tournament details
- Host country: Czech Republic
- City: Prague
- Dates: 9–12 July 1998
- Teams: 4 (from 1 confederation)

Final positions
- Champions: Wales
- Runner-up: Czech Republic
- Third place: Gibraltar

Tournament statistics
- Matches played: 6
- Goals scored: 71 (11.83 per match)

The third and last qualifying tournament was held in Prague, Czech Republic from 9 to 12 July 1998 with four teams participating.

=== Standings ===
Pos	Team	Pld	W	D	L	GF	GA	GD	Pts	Qualification
1	Wales	3	3	0	0	28	0	+28	9	1999 European Championship
2	Czech Republic (H)	3	1	1	1	23	9	+14	4	
3	Gibraltar	3	1	1	1	18	6	+12	4	
4	Bulgaria	3	0	0	3	2	56	−54	0	

Source: Todor66
(H) Hosts

=== Matches ===
9 July 1998
16:00

Czech Republic	3–3	Gibraltar

9 July 1998
18:00

Wales	21–0	Bulgaria

11 July 1998
14:00

Wales	2–0	Gibraltar

11 July 1998
16:30

Bulgaria	1–20	Czech Republic

12 July 1998
14:30

Bulgaria	1–15	Gibraltar

12 July 1998
17:00

Czech Republic	0–5	Wales
