= West District Hockey =

West District of the Scottish Hockey Union
- Sport: Field Hockey
- Abbreviation: WD
- Founded: 1900
- Affiliation: Scottish Hockey Union
- Affiliation date: 1901
- President: Keith Joss
- Vice president(s): Alisdair Scott
- (Scotland)

West District of the Scottish Hockey Union is the full name for the district operating within the Scottish Hockey Union, that covers men's hockey in the west of Scotland. The West District operates local leagues, both indoor and outdoor, for men and many youth competitions.

== History ==
The Men's West District Hockey was founded in 1900, however competitive leagues were not allowed in Scotland until 1955. The first competitive season was won by Western Wildcats Hockey Club.

== Clubs ==
A number of clubs are affiliated to the Men's West District.

Anchor Hockey Club - formed in 1923

Ayr Hockey Club - formed in 1953

Clydesdale Hockey Club - formed in 1902 as Cartha

Dumfries Hockey Club - formed in 1907 as Crichton Royal

Glasgow High Kelvinside Hockey Club - formed in 1899 as Cochrane Park

Giffnock Hockey Club - formed in 1919 as Whitecraigs

Glasgow University Hockey Club - formed in 1907

Greenock Morton Hockey Club - formed in 1921, possibly as Bridge of Weir and Clutha

Helensburgh Hockey Club - formed in 1974

Hillhead Hockey Club - formed in 1970

Irvine Hockey Club - formed in 1982

Kelburne Hockey Club - formed in 1969

Oban Hockey Club - formed in 2016

Rottenrow Blue Sox Hockey Club - formed in 2009

Stepps Hockey Club - formed in 1913

Strathclyde University Hockey Club - formed in 1921, formerly Royal College of Science and Technology

Uddingston Hockey Club - formed in 1930

Western Wildcats Hockey Club - formed in 1898

== League Hockey ==
The main aim of the West District is to provide competitive league hockey, both indoor and outdoor, within the district to any of its member clubs. Currently there are 3 West District Divisions, however there have been as many as 6 over the history of the district. For a full list of divisions and the champions, see West District Men's Hockey Divisions
