= Gareth Hall (field hockey) =

Scottish field hockey player

Personal information
- Born: 22 October 1982 (age 43)

Sport
- Sport: Field hockey
Senior career
Years	Team	Caps	Goals
2000–2013	Kelburne	-	-
2013–2016	Beeston	-	-
2016–2018	Wimbledon	-	-
National team
Years	Team	Caps	Goals
2003–2019	Scotland	115	-
Medal record
Representing Scotland
European Championship II
Bronze medal – third place	2007 Lisbon	Team
Bronze medal – third place	2011 Vinnytsia	Team

Gareth Hall (born 22 October 1982) is a Scottish former field hockey player who represented the Scotland men's national field hockey team at two Commonwealth Games.

== Biography ==
Hall played club hockey for Kelburne Hockey Club in the Scottish Hockey Premiership. While at Kelburne he made his international debut with Scotland.

Hall won a bronze medal with Scotland at the 2007 Men's EuroHockey Nations Trophy and played for the Scottish team during the 2010 Commonwealth Games in Delhi. The following year, Hall won a bronze medal with the Scotland team at the 2011 Men's EuroHockey Championship II in Vinnytsia, Ukraine.

Hhe moved to play his club hockey with Beeston Hockey Club in the Men's England Hockey League for the start of the 2013–2014 season and while there helped the team win the league title. Shortly after the title, he participated in his second Commonwealth Games after being selected as a member of Team Scotland for the men's tournament at the 2014 Commonwealth Games in Glasgow.

Hall signed for Wimbledon Hockey Club from 2016/17 and took an assistant coach role and in 2019, he was the national team manager for Scotland at the 2019 Men's EuroHockey Championship II in Antwerp.
