= Iain Scholefield =

Scottish field hockey player

Personal information
- Born: 31 March 1987 (age 39)

Sport
- Sport: Field hockey
- Position: Midfield
Senior career
Years	Team	Caps	Goals
2007–2011	Kelburne	-	-
2011–2012	Royal Uccle	-	-
2012–2014	Qui Vive	-	-
2014–2023	Kelburne	-	-
National team
Years	Team	Caps	Goals
2008–2014	Scotland	127	-
Medal record
Representing Scotland
European Championship II
Bronze medal – third place	2011 Vinnytsia	Team

Iain Scholefield (born 31 March 1987) is a Scottish former field hockey player who represented the Scotland men's national field hockey team at two Commonwealth Games.

== Biography ==
Scholefield studied Civil Engineering with Architecture at the University of Glasgow and played club hockey for Kelburne Hockey Club in the Scottish Hockey Premiership.

He represented the Scottish team during the 2010 Commonwealth Games in Delhi and the following year, Scholefield won a bronze medal with the Scotland team at the 2011 Men's EuroHockey Championship II in Vinnytsia, Ukraine.

He earned 50th cap in 2010 and 100th cap in 2012. Meanwhile, he moved to Belgium and the Netherlands from 2011 to 2014 to play hockey for Royal Uccle Hockey Club and Qui Vive Hockey Club respectively.

In June 2014 he was selected as a member of Team Scotland for the men's tournament at the 2014 Commonwealth Games in Glasgow.

After his second Commonwealth Games appearance he returned to Kelburne to play club hockey and retired from international hcokley the same year
