= 2009 Men's EuroHockey Nations Trophy =

European field hockey competition

Tournament details
- Host country: Wales
- City: Wrexham
- Dates: 1–8 August
- Teams: 8 (from 1 confederation)

Final positions
- Champions: Ireland (2nd title)
- Runner-up: Russia
- Third place: Wales

Tournament statistics
- Matches played: 20
- Goals scored: 97 (4.85 per match)

The 2009 Men's EuroHockey Nations Trophy was the 3rd edition of the Men's EuroHockey Nations Trophy, the second level of the European field hockey championships organized by the European Hockey Federation. It was held from 1 to 8 August 2009 in Wrexham, Wales.

The tournament also served as a qualifier for the 2011 EuroHockey Championship, with the finalists Ireland and Russia qualifying. Ireland won their second EuroHockey Nations Trophy title by defeating Russia 2–1 in the final and the hosts Wales won the bronze medal by defeating the Czech Republic 5–2.

== Qualified teams ==
Dates	Event	Location	Quotas	Qualifiers
19–26 August 2007	2007 EuroHockey Championship	Mönchengladbach, Germany	2	Czech Republic (25); Ireland (18)
9–12 September 2007	2007 EuroHockey Nations Trophy	Lisbon, Portugal	4	Italy (27); Scotland (26); Switzerland (30); Wales (28)
9–15 September 2007	2007 EuroHockey Challenge I	Kazan, Russia	2	Belarus (32); Russia (22)
Total			8	

== Format ==
The eight teams were split into two groups of four teams. The top two teams advanced to the semifinals to determine the winner in a knockout system. The bottom two teams played in a new group with the teams they did not play against in the group stage. The last two teams were relegated to the 2011 EuroHockey Championship III.

== Results ==
All times were local (UTC+2).

=== Preliminary round ===
==== Pool A ====
Pos	Team	Pld	W	D	L	GF	GA	GD	Pts	Qualification
1	Russia	3	3	0	0	14	5	+9	9	Semi-finals
2	Ireland	3	2	0	1	13	5	+8	6	Semi-finals
3	Belarus	3	0	1	2	7	13	−6	1	Pool C
4	Italy	3	0	1	2	10	21	−11	1	Pool C

Source: The-Sports.org
Rules for classification: 1) points; 2) goal difference; 3) goals scored; 4) head-to-head result.

1 August 2009

Ireland	2–1	Belarus

1 August 2009

Russia	6–3	Italy

2 August 2009

Ireland	10–2	Italy

3 August 2009

Russia	6–1	Belarus

4 August 2009

Ireland	1–2	Russia

4 August 2009

Italy	5–5	Belarus

==== Pool B ====
Pos	Team	Pld	W	D	L	GF	GA	GD	Pts	Qualification
1	Wales (H)	3	1	2	0	6	4	+2	5	Semi-finals
2	Czech Republic	3	1	2	0	6	4	+2	5	Semi-finals
3	Scotland	3	1	1	1	8	6	+2	4	Pool C
4	Switzerland	3	0	1	2	2	8	−6	1	Pool C

Source: The-Sports.org
Rules for classification: 1) points; 2) goal difference; 3) goals scored; 4) head-to-head result.
(H) Hosts

1 August 2009

Scotland	2–4	Wales

1 August 2009

Czech Republic	3–1	Switzerland

2 August 2009

Czech Republic	1–1	Wales

3 August 2009

Scotland	4–0	Switzerland

4 August 2009

Switzerland	1–1	Wales

4 August 2009

Scotland	2–2	Czech Republic

=== Fifth to eighth place classification ===
==== Pool C ====
The points obtained in the preliminary round against the other team are taken over.

Pos	Team	Pld	W	D	L	GF	GA	GD	Pts	Relegation
5	Scotland	3	3	0	0	11	4	+7	9	
6	Belarus	3	1	1	1	7	7	0	4	
7	Italy	3	1	1	1	10	11	−1	4	EuroHockey Championship III
8	Switzerland	3	0	0	3	1	7	−6	0	EuroHockey Championship III

Source: The-Sports.org
Rules for classification: 1) points; 2) goal difference; 3) goals scored; 4) head-to-head result.

6 August 2009

Belarus	1–0	Switzerland

6 August 2009

Italy	3–5	Scotland

7 August 2009

Belarus	1–2	Scotland

7 August 2009

Italy	2–1	Switzerland

=== First to fourth place classification ===
Semi-finals
6 August
Ireland	1
Wales	0
6 August
Russia	4
Czech Republic	1

Final
8 August
Ireland	2
Russia	1
Third place
8 August
Wales	5
Czech Republic	2

==== Semi-finals ====
6 August 2009

Ireland	1–0	Wales

6 August 2009

Russia	4–1	Czech Republic

==== Third place game ====
8 August 2009

Wales	5–2	Czech Republic

==== Final ====
8 August 2009

Ireland	2–1	Russia

== Final standings ==
Rank	Team
Gold medal	Ireland
Silver medal	Russia
Bronze medal	Wales
4	Czech Republic
5	Scotland
6	Belarus
7	Italy
8	Switzerland

Qualified for the 2011 EuroHockey Championship

Relegated to the EuroHockey Championship III

== See also ==
- 2009 Men's EuroHockey Nations Challenge I
- 2009 Men's EuroHockey Nations Championship
- 2009 Women's EuroHockey Nations Trophy
