= 2005 Men's EuroHockey Nations Challenge I =

Field hockey tournament

Tournament details
- Host country: Ukraine
- City: Vinnytsia
- Dates: 11–17 September
- Teams: 7 (from 1 confederation)

Final positions
- Champions: Ukraine (1st title)
- Runner-up: Portugal
- Third place: Gibraltar

Tournament statistics
- Matches played: 15
- Goals scored: 79 (5.27 per match)

The 2005 Men's EuroHockey Nations Challenge I was the first edition of the Men's EuroHockey Nations Challenge I, the third level of the men's European field hockey championships organized by the European Hockey Federation. It was held in Vinnytsia, Ukraine, from September 11 to September 17, 2005.

The number one and two teams were promoted to the "B"-level, the 2007 Men's EuroHockey Nations Trophy, while no team was relegated to the "D"-level, the 2007 Men's EuroHockey Nations Challenge II.

== Results ==
=== Preliminary round ===
==== Pool A ====
Pos	Team	Pld	W	D	L	GF	GA	GD	Pts	Qualification
1	Ukraine (H)	2	2	0	0	9	1	+8	6	Semi-finals
2	Croatia	2	1	0	1	6	6	0	3	Semi-finals
3	Sweden	2	0	0	2	2	10	−8	0	5–7th place semi-final

Source: TheSports.org
(H) Hosts

11 September 2005

Ukraine	4–1	Croatia

13 September 2005

Sweden	2–5	Croatia

14 September 2005

Sweden	0–5	Ukraine

==== Pool B ====
Pos	Team	Pld	W	D	L	GF	GA	GD	Pts	Qualification
1	Portugal	3	3	0	0	11	0	+11	9	Semi-finals
2	Gibraltar	3	2	0	1	12	3	+9	6	Semi-finals
3	Greece	3	1	0	2	3	9	−6	3	Fifth place game
4	Hungary	3	0	0	3	2	16	−14	0	5–7th place semi-final

Source: TheSports.org

11 September 2005

Hungary	2–4	Greece

11 September 2005

Gibraltar	3–6	Portugal

12 September 2005

Hungary	0–4	Portugal

12 September 2005

Gibraltar	2–1	Greece

14 September 2005

Greece	0–7	Portugal

14 September 2005

Gibraltar	8–0	Hungary

=== Fifth to seventh place classification ===
5–7th place semi-final
16 September
Sweden	5
Hungary	1

Fifth place
17 September
Greece	2
Sweden	1

==== 5–7th place semi-final ====
16 September 2005

Sweden	5–1	Hungary

==== Fifth place game ====
17 September 2005

Sweden	1–2	Greece

=== First to fourth place classification ===
Semi-finals
30 July
Ukraine	2
Gibraltar	1
30 July
Portugal	3
Croatia	0

Final
30 July
Ukraine	2
Portugal	0
Third place
30 July
Gibraltar	5
Croatia	3

==== Semi-finals ====
16 September 2005

Ukraine	2–1	Gibraltar

16 September 2005

Portugal	3–0	Croatia

==== Third place game ====
17 September 2005

Gibraltar	5–3	Croatia

==== Final ====
17 September 2005

Ukraine	2–0	Portugal

== Final standings ==
Rank	Team
Gold medal	Ukraine
Silver medal	Portugal
Bronze medal	Gibraltar
4	Croatia
5	Greece
6	Sweden
7	Hungary

Promoted to the EuroHockey Nations Trophy

== See also ==
- 2005 Men's EuroHockey Nations Trophy
