= Murray Collins =

Scottish field hockey player

Personal information
- Born: 25 July 1996 (age 30) Johannesburg, South Africa

Sport
- Sport: Field hockey
- Position: Defender
Senior career
Years	Team	Caps	Goals
2014–2019	Loughborough Students'	-	-
2019–2025	Teddington	-	-
National team
Years	Team	Caps	Goals
2014–2022	Scotland	62	(4)
Medal record
Representing Scotland
European Championship II
Bronze medal – third place	2015 Prague	Team
Silver medal – second place	2021 Gniezno	Team

Murray Collins (born 25 July 1996) is a Scottish field hockey player who represented the Scottish national team at the 2022 Commonwealth Games.

== Biography ==
Collins was born in Johannesburg, South Africa and was educated at Fenwick Primary School and Hutchesons' Grammar School. He studied Design Ergonomics at Loughborough University. While at Loughborough, he played for Loughborough Students' Hockey Club in the Men's England Hockey League and made his Scottish senior debut and won a bronze medal with Scotland at the 2015 Men's EuroHockey Championship II in Prague.

He also played for Scotland at the 2019 Men's EuroHockey Championship.

He joined Teddington Hockey Club for the 2019–20 and became the club captain.

While at Teddington he helped Scotland win the silver medal at the 2021 Men's EuroHockey Championship II in Gniezno, Poland and in 2022, he was selected to represent Scotland at the 2022 Commonwealth Games in Birmingham, England, in the men's tournament.

== Family ==
His older sister, Robyn was a Scottish international player.
