= Kenny Bain =

Scottish field hockey player

Personal information
- Born: 16 March 1990 (age 36) Glasgow, Scotland

Sport
- Sport: Field hockey
- Position: Forward
Senior career
Years	Team	Caps	Goals
–2010	Kelburne	-	-
2010–2011	hdm	-	-
2011–2015	Hurley	-	-
2015–2016	Amsterdam	-	-
2016–2017	HGC	-	-
2017–2025	Hurley	-	-
National team
Years	Team	Caps	Goals
2012–2022	Scotland	190	(104)
Medal record
Representing Scotland
European Championship II
Bronze medal – third place	2011 Vinnytsia	Team
Bronze medal – third place	2015 Prague	Team
Gold medal – first place	2017 Glasgow	Team

Kenneth Bain (born 16 March 1990) is a Scottish field hockey player who played for the Scottish national team.

== Biography ==
Bain played club hockey for Kelburne in the Scottish leagues and played for Scotland during the 2010 Commonwealth Games in Delhi. After the Games, Bain moved to play in the Netherlands for Haagsche Delftsche Mixed and won a bronze medal with the team at the 2011 Men's EuroHockey Championship II in Vinnytsia, Ukraine.

Bain moved to Hurley for the 2011/12 season and made a second appearance at the Commonwealth Games after participating in the 2014 Commonwealth Games in Glasgow. He won a bronze medal with Scotland at the 2015 Men's EuroHockey Championship II in Prague.

In 2015 he joined Amsterdam. After the head coach Alyson Annan left in 2016 he moved to HGC. After one season with HGC he returned to Hurley.

Bain won a gold medal with Scotland at the 2017 Men's EuroHockey Championship II in Glasgow. He was selected to represent Scotland at the 2018 Commonwealth Games in Gold Coast and in August 2019, he was selected for the 2019 EuroHockey Championship.
