= Rob Smith (field hockey) =

Canada field hockey player

Rob Smith (born 10 November 1961 in Melbourne, Australia) is a former field hockey player from Canada, who competed at the 1984 Summer Olympics in Los Angeles, California. There the resident of North Vancouver, British Columbia finished in tenth place with the Men's National Team.

== International senior competitions ==
- 1984 – Olympic Games, Los Angeles (10th)
