= Alan Forsyth =

Scottish field hockey player (born 1992)

Personal information
- Born: 5 April 1992 (age 34) Paisley, Renfrewshire, Scotland
- Height: 181 cm (5 ft 11 in)
- Weight: 83 kg (183 lb)

Sport
- Sport: Field hockey
- Position: Forward
Senior career
Years	Team	Caps	Goals
2006-2013	Kelburne	-	-
2013-2021	Surbiton	-	-
2021-2023	HGC	-	-
2021–2026	Old Georgians	-	-
National team
Years	Team	Caps	Goals
2015–2024	GB	53	(22)
2009–2024	Scotland	160	(101)
Medal record
Representing Scotland
European Championship II
Bronze medal – third place	2011 Vinnytsia	Team
Bronze medal – third place	2015 Prague	Team
Gold medal – first place	2017 Glasgow	Team
Silver medal – second place	2021 Gniezno	Team

Alan Forsyth (born 5 April 1992) is a Scottish field hockey player who plays as a forward for Men's England Hockey League club Old Georgians and the Scotland and Great Britain national teams.

== Biography ==
Forsyth, the son of Derek Forsyth, a head coach of Scotland, started his career with Scottish club Kelburne Hockey Club, winning six Scottish league titles, making his senior international debut for Scotland in 2009 and represented Scotland at the 2010 Commonwealth Games in Delhi in 2010.

He won a bronze medal with the team at the 2011 Men's EuroHockey Championship II in Vinnytsia, Ukraine.

He moved to England to play in the Men's England Hockey League Premier Division from 2014 until 2021 for Surbiton, where he won three league titles. Also while at Surbiton he competed in two more Commonwealth Games in 2014 in Glasgow and 2018 in Gold Coast and in between won a gold medal with Scotland at the 2017 Men's EuroHockey Championship II in Glasgow.

He also made his senior international debut for Great Britain on 19 October 2015 but was only named as reserve for the 2020 Summer Olympics.

After leaving Surbiton to play in the Dutch Hoofdklasse for HGC he spent two years in the Netherlands and in 2022 became the first Scottish mens hockey player to compete at four Commonwealth Games, after competing in the 2022 Commonwealth Games in Birmingham.

He returned in 2023 to England to play for Old Georgians but announced his retirement from international hockey in 2024 with 101 goals from 160 international Scotland caps.

Forsyth was part of the Old Georgians team that won the league title during the 2023-24 season. He won another Premier league title with Old Georgians in 2026.

== Honours & achievements ==
=== Individual & Team ===
- Investec Men's Hockey League Player of the Season

2015/16, 2016/17, 2017/18, 2018/19

- Investec Men's Hockey Top Goal Scorer of the Season

2015/16, 2016/17, 2017/18, 2018/19

- Endland Hockey Mens Premier League winners

2016/17, 2017/18, 2019/20, 2023/24

- England Hockey Indoor Super Sixes

2016/17, 2019/20, 2023/24

- UK hockey player of the year award for 2018 Writers’ Club.
