= Jim Osborn =

Australian cricketer (1935–2008)

Personal information
- Born: 13 February 1935; Adelaide, Australia
- Died: 20 March 2008 (aged 73)
- Source: Cricinfo, 18 September 2020

Jim Osborn (13 February 1935 – 20 March 2008) was an Australian cricketer. He played in two first-class matches for South Australia between 1953 and 1955. Born to Leonard Roy Osborn (1896–1976) and Edna Irene Osborn, née March (1898–1964), he grew up in South Australia before beginning his brief but notable cricketing career. He had a wife, with whom he had two daughters, who had two grandchildren.

== See also ==
- List of South Australian representative cricketers
