= 2007 Men's EuroHockey Nations Trophy =

Tournament details
- Host country: Portugal
- City: Lisbon
- Dates: 9–12 September
- Teams: 8 (from 1 confederation)
- Venue(s): Complexo Desportivo do Jamor

Final positions
- Champions: Poland (1st title)
- Runner-up: Austria
- Third place: Scotland

Tournament statistics
- Matches played: 20
- Goals scored: 92 (4.6 per match)

The 2007 Men's EuroHockey Nations Trophy was the second edition of the Men's EuroHockey Nations Trophy, the second level of the European field hockey championships organized by the European Hockey Federation. It was held in Lisbon, Portugal from 9 to 16 September 2007.

Whilst both Austria and Poland were promoted to the EuroHockey Championship in 2009, Poland defeated Austria to win the title. Poland, Austria, and Switzerland qualified from this event to the WorldHockey Olympic Qualifier Tournaments in 2008.

== Qualified teams ==
Dates	Event	Location	Quotas	Qualifiers
28 August – 4 September 2005	2005 EuroHockey Championship	Leipzig, Germany	2	Poland; Scotland
11–17 September 2005	2005 EuroHockey Nations Trophy	Rome, Italy	4	Austria; Italy; Switzerland; Wales
11–17 September 2005	2005 EuroHockey Challenge I	Vinnytsia, Ukraine	2	Portugal; Ukraine
Total			8	

== Format ==
The eight teams were split into two groups of four teams. The top two teams advanced to the semi-finals to determine the winner in a knockout system. The bottom two teams play in a new group with the teams they did not play against in the group stage. The last two teams will be relegated to the 2009 EuroHockey Challenge I.

== Results ==
=== Preliminary round ===
==== Pool A ====
Pos	Team	Pld	W	D	L	GF	GA	GD	Pts	Qualification
1	Austria	3	2	1	0	6	4	+2	7	Semi-finals
2	Poland	3	2	0	1	16	5	+11	6	Semi-finals
3	Italy	3	1	0	2	6	10	−4	3	Pool C
4	Portugal (H)	3	0	1	2	3	12	−9	1	Pool C

Source: TheSports.org
(H) Hosts

9 September 2007
15:15

Poland	8–2	Portugal

Umpires:
Maksym Perepelitza (UKR)
Nathan Stagno (GIB)

9 September 2007
17:15

Italy	2–3	Austria

Umpires:
Martin Madden (SCO)
Will Drury (WAL)

11 September 2007
15:00

Poland	1–2	Austria

Umpires:
Will Drury (WAL)
Luis Terencio (POR)

11 September 2007
17:00

Italy	3–0	Portugal

Umpires:
Eduardo Lizana (ESP)
Maksym Perepelitza (UKR)

12 September 2007
15:00

Poland	7–1	Italy

Umpires:
Michael Eimler (AUT)
Thomas Lingg (SUI)

12 September 2007
17:00

Austria	1–1	Portugal

Umpires:
Martin Madden (SCO)
Camillo Degli Esosti (ITA)

==== Pool B ====
Pos	Team	Pld	W	D	L	GF	GA	GD	Pts	Qualification
1	Scotland	3	3	0	0	10	1	+9	9	Semi-finals
2	Switzerland	3	1	1	1	4	8	−4	4	Semi-finals
3	Ukraine	3	0	2	1	4	5	−1	2	Pool C
4	Wales	3	0	1	2	3	7	−4	1	Pool C

Source: TheSports.org

9 September 2007
11:00

Scotland	1–0	Ukraine

Umpires:
Pawel Linkowski
Thomas Lingg (SUI)

9 September 2007
13:00

Wales	0–2	Switzerland

Umpires:
Eduardo Lizana (ESP)
Luis Terencio (POR)

10 September 2007
15:00

Scotland	6–0	Switzerland

Umpires:
Pawel Linkowski (POL)
Camillo Degli Esposti (ITA)

10 September 2007
17:00

Wales	2–2	Ukraine

Umpires:
Martin Madden (SCO)
Michael Eimler (AUT)

12 September 2007
11:00

Scotland	3–1	Wales

Umpires:
Luis Terencio (POR)
Pawel Linkowski (POL)

12 September 2007
13:00

Switzerland	2–2	Ukraine

Umpires:
Nathan Stagno (GIB)
Will Drury (WAL)

=== Fifth to eighth place classification ===
==== Pool C ====
The points obtained in the preliminary round against the other team are taken over.

Pos	Team	Pld	W	D	L	GF	GA	GD	Pts	Relegation
5	Wales	3	2	1	0	10	4	+6	7	
6	Italy	3	2	0	1	7	4	+3	6	
7	Portugal (H)	3	1	0	2	3	10	−7	3	EuroHockey Nations Challenge I
8	Ukraine	3	0	1	2	5	7	−2	1	EuroHockey Nations Challenge I

Source: TheSports.org
(H) Hosts

14 September 2007
10:00

Portugal	3–2	Ukraine

Umpires:
Thomas Lingg (SUI)
Camillo Degli Esposti (ITA)

14 September 2007
12:00

Italy	2–3	Wales

Umpires:
Martin Madden (SCO)
Michael Eimler (AUT)

15 September 2007
15:00

Portugal	0–5	Wales

Umpires:
Pawel Linkowski (POL)
Thomas Lingg (SUI)

15 September 2007
17:00

Italy	2–1	Ukraine

Umpires:
Eduardo Lizana (ESP)
Martin Madden (SCO)

=== First to fourth place classification ===
Semi-finals
14 September
Poland	3
Scotland	1
14 September
Austria (p.s.)	2 (6)
Switzerland	2 (5)

Final
16 September
Poland	4
Austria	3
Third place
16 September
Scotland (a.e.t.)	4
Switzerland	3

==== Semi-finals ====
14 September 2007
14:00

Poland	3–1	Scotland

Umpires:
Luis Terencio (POR)
Nathan Stagno (GIB)

14 September 2007
16:30

Austria	2–2 (a.e.t.)	Switzerland
Penalties
	6–5

Umpires:
Pawel Linkowski (POL)
Eduardo Lizana (ESP)

==== Third place game ====
16 September 2007
12:00

Scotland	4–3 (a.e.t.)	Switzerland

Umpires:
Maksym Perepelitza (UKR)
Eduardo Lizana (ESP)

==== Final ====
16 September 2007
14:30

Poland	4–3	Austria

Umpires:
Will Drury (WAL)
Nathan Stagno (GIB)

== Final standings ==
Rank	Team
1st place, gold medalist(s)	Poland
2nd place, silver medalist(s)	Austria
3rd place, bronze medalist(s)	Scotland
4	Switzerland
5	Wales
6	Italy
7	Portugal
8	Ukraine

Qualified for the 2009 EuroHockey Championship

Relegated to the EuroHockey Nations Challenge I

== See also ==
- 2007 Men's EuroHockey Nations Challenge I
- 2007 Men's EuroHockey Nations Championship
