= Sweden men's national field hockey team =

Sweden
- Association: Swedish Hockey Association
- Confederation: EHF (Europe)

FIH ranking
- Current: NR (19 December 2025)
- Highest: 33 (2011)
- Lowest: 77 (October 2017 – December 2017, January 2019)

The Sweden men's national field hockey team represents Sweden in international field hockey competitions.

== Tournament record ==
=== EuroHockey Championship II ===
- 2011 – 7th place

=== EuroHockey Championship III ===
- 2005 – 6th place
- 2007 – 6th place
- 2009 – (silver)
- 2013 – 6th place
- 2015 – 6th place

=== EuroHockey Championship IV ===
- 2021 – Withdrew

=== Hockey World League ===
- 2012–13 – Round 1

== See also ==
- Sweden women's national field hockey team
