= Cameron Fraser =

Scottish field hockey player

Personal information
- Born: 20 August 1988 (age 37) Dumfries, Scotland

Sport
- Sport: Field hockey
- Position: Midfielder
Senior career
Years	Team	Caps	Goals
2007–2018	Grange	-	-
National team
Years	Team	Caps	Goals
2010–2018	Scotland	32	-
Medal record
Representing Scotland
European Championship II
Gold medal – first place	2017 Glasgow	Team

Cameron Fraser (born 20 August 1988) is a Scottish former field hockey player who represented Scotland at two Commonwealth Games.

== Biography ==
Fraser was born in Dumfries, Scotland, and was educated at Cramond Primary and George Watson's College.

Fraser played club hockey for Grange in the Scottish Hockey Premiership and represented the Scottish team at the 2010 Commonwealth Games in Delhi before leaving international hockey for five years, returning to play for Scotland in June 2016. Fraser then won a gold medal with Scotland at the 2017 Men's EuroHockey Championship II in Glasgow.

Still at Grange, he was voted player of the tournament at the 2018 EuroHockey Club Trophy in Vienna and participated in his second Commonwealth Games, playing in the Commonwealth Games hockey tournament at the 2018 Commonwealth Games in Gold Coast, Australia.
