= Helensburgh Hockey Club =

Scottish field hockey club

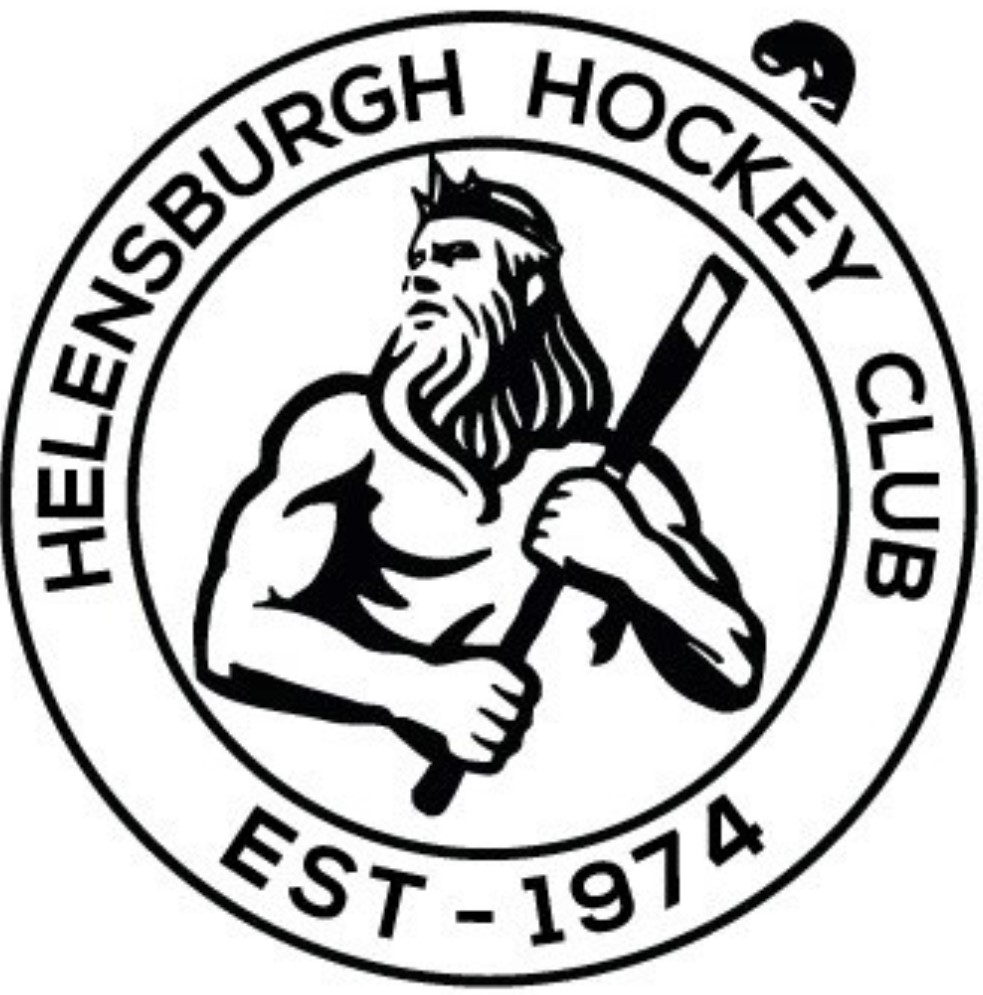
- Short name: HHC
- League: West District Men's Hockey
- Home ground: Hermitage Academy

Personnel
- Coach: Gavin McWilliam
- Chairman: Rob Heywood
- Website: Helensburgh Hockey Club
| Home | Away |

Helensburgh Hockey Club is a field hockey club based in Argyll & Bute, Scotland. They were founded in 1974 as a men's hockey club and expanded to include a ladies' club in 1983. They play their home games at Hermitage Academy in Helensburgh and the three men's teams compete in the West District Men's Hockey leagues.

== History ==
=== Formation of the club ===
Helensburgh Hockey Club was founded on 20 April 1974 by a group of former Hermitage Academy pupils looking to continue hockey after school as well the local Naval Base, HMNB Clyde, having a number of employees looking for regular hockey. A prominent member among them was John Steele who played for the club from the very beginning. John, along with Ravi Khosla and John Andrews were the main members credited with starting Helensburgh Hockey Club. The first recorded game for the club was actually a month before its official formation. They played in a friendly against Hillhead - a match which they won 2–0. The club entered the West District Division 2 and played there first competitive game against East Kilbride, winning 4–0. The club enjoyed early success winning the 2nd division two years in a row (They were not promoted after the first season due to the amalgamation of the West and South West Districts). The popularity of the sport in town grew rapidly and the club managed to start fielding a 2nd XI. The 2nd XI's first recorded game was a friendly win against Uddingston in 1974, however they did not enter the league until 1980, with a 4–0 win over Whitecraigs.

Many players at the club had strong navy links due to the close proximity of HMNB Clyde. A number of early games were played against the navy, including a 11–0 victory over HMS Jupiter. Games against HMS Bristol, HMS Juno and HMS Penelope were also played. The club used the facilities at HMNB Clyde for playing, training and after match teas.

During the late 70s and early 80s, the club bounced between the 1st division and the 2nd division in the West District. In 1983–84, the club finished in its highest ever league position, finishing second under the command of Robert Henderson. In season 1980–81, the 2nd XI joined the newly created 4th division and under the leadership of Jim Riach and Jeremy Nicol, achieved as high as second place.

=== Ladies XI ===
In 1982–83, the club started a ladies team. They entered the West District Women's division 6 and were an instant hit. Between 1983-84 and 1988-89 they earned successive promotions from division 6 to division 1. This impressive run halted when they reached division 1, and they were relegated in 1988–89, however it was a fantastic achievement nonetheless.

After a number of seasons in the 2nd division, they had there most successful stint in 1994–95, winning the west district division 1. As district champions, they were then offered the chance to play in the National League. The decision to go national was a massive club decision and was eventually turned down by the club. This led to a number of the ladies leaving Helensburgh Hockey Club and creating their own Helensburgh Ladies, a separate entity. The ladies XI of Helensburgh Hockey Club eventually dwindled away and by the year 2000, Helensburgh was just a men's club again.

=== A struggling club ===
Whilst the ladies were doing well on the pitch, the men were struggling to field two teams and by 1990 the club was down to just one men's XI. By the end of the '90s they had also lost the ladies section. The majority of the 90s was spent bouncing between division 1 and 2 for the men, but with the formation of Scottish Hockey's regional leagues in 1997–98, the club were moved to division 1 and remained there for four seasons.

=== The future of the club ===
The late 90s saw an increase in membership, thanks to the tireless efforts of Andy Richardson, Brian Caulfield and Barry Cox. This led to the club fielding a 2nd XI once more. Barry was also instrumental in starting the club's junior hockey club. The success of the junior club meant that a 3rd XI could be formed by 2005 and the club continued to grow from strength to strength.

Success on the pitch was harder to come by however. The 2nd XI managed to finish second in division 4, during the 2005–06 season, and gaining them promotion. The 1st XI recorded their longest stint in the 1st division, between 2010 and 2017, but eventual relegation at the end of the 2016–17 season saw them return to division 2. They did, however, bounce straight back, winning the 2nd division title and bringing some silverware to the club after many long years of empty trophy cabinets.

The 2nd XI soon followed suit and gained promotion and the title of division 3 champions after a successful 2022–23 season. This sees the 2nd XI feature in division 2 for the first time in the club's history.

After a disappointing period, the club, having lost members, has had to drop back to 2 XI's.

== Location ==
The club has never had its own home in Helensburgh having played at HMNB Clyde, Hermitage Academy and Lomond School pitches. Many venues have been used as the clubhouse, including the Ardencaple hotel, the Pinewood, the Cairndhu, Helensburgh Rugby Club and currently Craighelen Lawn Tennis & Squash Club.

== Honours ==
=== Major Honours ===
- 1st XI
  - West District 1st Division
    - Runners-up (1): 1983–84
- Ladies XI
  - West District 1st Division
    - Winners (1): 1994–95
    - Runners-up (1):1993-94
    - District Cup (4): 1986–87, 1992–93, 1993–94, 1994–95

=== Minor Honours ===
- 1st XI
  - West District Division 2
    - Winners (5): 1974–75, 1975–76, 1979–80, 1982–83, 2017–18
    - Runners-up (1): 1990–91
    - Third Placed (3): 1994–95, 2003–04, 2007–08
- 2nd XI
  - West District Division 3
    - Winner (1): 2022–23
    - Third Placed (1): 2013–14
    - West District 4th Division
    - Runners-up (3): 1982–83, 1988–89, 2004–05
- 3rd XI
  - West District 4th Division
    - Runners-up (1): 2016–17

== Club Records ==
=== Team Records ===
- Biggest Wins
  - 1st XI 12-0 Uddingston - 14 February 2018 - West District 2nd Division
  - 2nd XI 11-0 Clydesdale - 29 September 2018 - West District 3rd Division
  - 3rd XI 8-1 Hillhead - 1 April 2023 - West District 4th Division
  - Ladies XI 12-0 Hyndland - 8 October 1994 - West District 1st Division
- Biggest Defeats
  - 1st XI 12-0 Anchor - 6 October 2012 - West District 1st Division
  - 2nd XI 13-1 Stirling Wanderers- 15 May 2019 - West District Cup
  - 3rd XI 15-0 Rottenrow - 24 October 2009 - West District 4th Division

=== Player Records ===
- Most Recorded Appearances
  - Gordon Black - 306
  - Robert Henderson - 290
  - Barry Cox - 280

- Most Goals
  - Barry Cox - 137 (280)
  - Jonathan Cox - 116 (136)
  - Jamie Caulfield - 109(184)
