= José Borrell (field hockey) =

Spanish field hockey player (born 1953)

Personal information
- Nationality: Spanish
- Born: 4 April 1953 (age 73)

Sport
- Sport: Field hockey

José Borrell Juanico (born 4 April 1953) is a Spanish field hockey player. He competed in the men's tournament at the 1972 Summer Olympics.
