= Michael Christie (field hockey) =

Scottish field hockey player

Personal information
- Born: 23 January 1987 (age 39) Glasgow, Scotland

Sport
- Sport: Field hockey
- Position: Midfield
Senior career
Years	Team	Caps	Goals
2006–2017	Kelburne	-	-
National team
Years	Team	Caps	Goals
2005–	Scotland		-
2007–2007	GB	1	-

Michael Christie (born 23 January 1987) is a male former field hockey defender from Scotland.

== Biography ==
Christie studied accountancy at the University of the West of Scotland. Christie earned his first cap for the Scotland men's national field hockey team in 2005.

He played club hockey for Kelburne in the Scottish leagues and was part of the Scotland Commonwealth Games team at the 2006 Commonwealth Games in Melbourne.

He made his Great Britain debut on 23 October 2007 and earned one cap. He missed the 2010 Commonwealth Games in Delhi due to injury.

== Family ==
His older brother Jonathan was also a member of Scotland men's national squad.
