= Mark Ralph (field hockey) =

Scottish field hockey player

Personal information
- Born: 10 February 1980 (age 46) Paisley, Scotland

Sport
- Sport: Field hockey
- Position: Midfield
Senior career
Years	Team	Caps	Goals
2001–2008	Kelburne	-	-
2008–2009	Klein Zwitzerland	-	-
2009–2013	Kelburne	-	-
National team
Years	Team	Caps	Goals
2007–2008	GB	24	(1)
2001–2010	Scotland	154	(74)

Mark Ralph (born 10 February 1980) is a former field hockey midfield player from Scotland.

== Biography ==
Ralph earned his first cap for Scotland in 2001 against India. His cousin David was also capped for Scotland. He was part of the Scotland Commonwealth Games team at the 2006 Commonwealth Games in Melbourne.

Ralph played his club hockey for Kelburne but after missing out on Olympic selection in 2008, he joined Dutch club Klein Zwitzerland afterwards. On his return to Scotland he became the Player Coach of Kelburne HC for 5 seasons and helped the club achieve 11 National League titles in a row and compete with European clubs at the EHL, making the KO16 at his first attempt at coaching at this level.

While at Kelburne, Ralph played for Scotland during the 2010 Commonwealth Games in Delhi.

At retirement Ralph had won 154 caps for Scotland and 24 caps for Great Britain. He scored 74 goals Scotland and 1 goal for GB. Ralph scored many of his goals due to a trademark drag flick.

Away from hockey, Ralph is a qualified Advanced Driving Instructor based in and around Glasgow. He also coaches at Glasgow Academy. In 2023, Ralph coached Clydesdale Western.
