= 2017 Men's EuroHockey Championship II =

Field hockey tournament

Tournament details
- Host country: Scotland
- City: Glasgow
- Dates: 6–12 August
- Teams: 8 (from 1 confederation)
- Venue: Glasgow National Hockey Centre

Final positions
- Champions: Scotland (1st title)
- Runner-up: Wales
- Third place: France

Tournament statistics
- Matches played: 20
- Goals scored: 106 (5.3 per match)
- Top scorer: (Scotland) Alan Forsyth (8 goals)

The 2017 Men's EuroHockey Championship II was the seventh edition of the EuroHockey Championship II, the second level of the European field hockey championships. It was held from the 6th to the 12th of August 2019 in Glasgow, Scotland. The tournament also served as a direct qualifier for the 2019 Men's EuroHockey Nations Championship, with the winner Scotland and runner-up Wales qualifying.

== Qualified teams ==
The following eight teams, shown with pre-tournament world rankings, competed in the tournament.

Dates	Event	Location	Quotas	Qualifiers
21–29 August 2015	2015 EuroHockey Championship	London, England	2	France (17); Russia (21)
19–27 July 2015	2015 EuroHockey Championship II	Prague, Czech Republic	4	Scotland (23); Czech Republic (24); ~~Azerbaijan~~ (Note: Azerbaijan qualified by finishing 5th in the 2015 EuroHockey Championship II but their national association was suspended by the FIH so Switzerland qualified instead); Ukraine (25); Switzerland (28)
19–25 July 2015	2015 EuroHockey Championship III	Lisbon, Portugal	2	Wales (32); Portugal (43)
Total			8	

== Format ==
The eight teams were split into two groups of four teams. The top two teams of each pool advanced to the semi-finals to determine the winner in a knockout system. The bottom two teams from each pool played in a new group with the teams they did not play against in the group stage. The last two teams were relegated to the EuroHockey Championship III.

== Results ==
All times are local (UTC+0).

=== Preliminary round ===
==== Pool A ====
Pos	Team	Pld	W	D	L	GF	GA	GD	Pts	Qualification
1	Scotland (H)	3	3	0	0	10	3	+7	9	Semi-finals
2	France	3	2	0	1	13	4	+9	6	Semi-finals
3	Ukraine	3	1	0	2	9	9	0	3	Pool C
4	Portugal	3	0	0	3	4	20	−16	0	Pool C

Source: FIH
Rules for classification: 1) points; 2) goal difference; 3) goals scored; 4) head-to-head result.
(H) Hosts

6 August 2017
16:15

Ukraine	7–2	Portugal
Luppa 9'; Koshlenko 26', 50'; Kovalenko 34'; Paziuk 39', 43'; Polishchuk 54'	Report	Pinto 34'; Ribeiro 50'

Umpires:
Fraser Bell (SCO)
Anton Kochin (RUS)

6 August 2017
18:30

France	1–2	Scotland
Martin-Brisac 53'	Report	Bain 29'; Forsyth 41'

Umpires:
Eduardo Lizana (ESP)
Nick Bennett (ENG)

8 August 2017
16:15

Ukraine	1–5	France
Paziuk 36'	Report	Peters-Deutz 17'; Tynevez 21'; Genestet 25'; Baumgarten 32'; Curty 53'

Umpires:
Eduardo Lizana (ESP)
Anton Kochin (RUS)

8 August 2017
18:30

Scotland	6–1	Portugal
Morton 1', 60'; Bain 21'; Forsyth 28', 40', 49'	Report	Tavares 20'

Umpires:
Nick Bennett (ENG)
Joachim Wimmer (SUI)

9 August 2017
16:15

France	7–1	Portugal
Van Straaten 18'; Goyet 21'; Genestet 23', 42', 59'; Tynevez 25'; Kieffer 37'	Report	Franco 60'

Umpires:
Tomas Holek (CZE)
Jamie Hooper (WAL)

9 August 2017
18:30

Scotland	2–1	Ukraine
Forsyth 55', 58'	Report	Polishchuk 34'

Umpires:
Anton Kochin (RUS)
Eduardo Lizana (ESP)

==== Pool B ====
Pos	Team	Pld	W	D	L	GF	GA	GD	Pts	Qualification
1	Wales	3	2	1	0	13	3	+10	7	Semi-finals
2	Russia	3	1	2	0	6	5	+1	5	Semi-finals
3	Czech Republic	3	1	1	1	4	4	0	4	Pool C
4	Switzerland	3	0	0	3	3	14	−11	0	Pool C

Source: FIH
Rules for classification: 1) points; 2) goal difference; 3) goals scored; 4) head-to-head result.

6 August 2017
11:45

Russia	3–2	Switzerland
Spichkovskii 33'; Nikitin 44'; Plesetskii 52'	Report	Hödle 25', 57'

Umpires:
Xavier Fenaert(FRA)
Jamie Hooper (WAL)

6 August 2017
14:00

Czech Republic	1–2	Wales
Barta 42'	Report	Furlong 24'; Kyriakides 29'

Umpires:
Maksym Perepelytsya (UKR)
Joacim Wimmer (SUI)

7 August 2017
16:15

Switzerland	0–9	Wales
	Report	Dolan-Gray 19'; Kyriakides 38', 45'; Kelly 39', 47', 57', 58'; Shipperley 48'; Hawker 55'

Umpires:
Xavier Fenaert (FRA)
Tomas Holek (CZE)

7 August 2017
18:30

Czech Republic	1–1	Russia
Plochy 23'	Report	Proskuriakov 56'

Umpires:
Maksym Perepelytsya (UKR)
Fraser Bell (SCO)

9 August 2017
11:45

Russia	2–2	Wales
Kornilov 37'; Khairullin 40'	Report	Furlong 32', 34'

Umpires:
Nick Bennett (ENG)
Maksym Perepelytsya (UKR)

9 August 2017
14:00

Switzerland	1–2	Czech Republic
Wyss-Chodat 44'	Report	Vohnicky 3'; Pauer 7'

Umpires:
Fraser Bell (SCO)
Xavier Fenaert (FRA)

=== Fifth to eighth place classification ===
==== Pool C ====
The points obtained in the preliminary round against the other team are taken over.

Pos	Team	Pld	W	D	L	GF	GA	GD	Pts	Relegation
5	Ukraine	3	2	1	0	13	5	+8	7	
6	Czech Republic	3	1	1	1	4	4	0	4	
7	Switzerland	3	1	0	2	7	9	−2	3	EuroHockey Championship III
8	Portugal	3	1	0	2	6	12	−6	3	EuroHockey Championship III

Source: FIH
Rules for classification: 1) points; 2) goal difference; 3) goals scored; 4) head-to-head result.

11 August 2017
9:30

Portugal	2–4	Switzerland
Rodrigues 39'; Vasco Ribeiro 58'	Report	Wyss-Chodat 13'; Feller 33'; Schewr 50'; Steffen 53'

Umpires:
Jamie Hooper (WAL)
Tomas Holek (CZE)

11 August 2017
11:45

Ukraine	1–1	Czech Republic
Plochy 46'	Report	Popovchenko 20'

Umpires:
Xavier Fenaert (FRA)
Joachim Wimmer (SUI)

12 August 2017
9:30

Ukraine	5–2	Switzerland
Kalinchuk 21', 60'; Koshlenko 27'; Diachuk 29'; Paziuk 43'	Report	Wyss-Chodat 17', 28'

Umpires:
Eduardo Lizana (ESP)
Fraser Bell (SCO)

12 August 2017
11:45

Czech Republic	1–2	Portugal
Plochy 58'	Report	Ventosa 4'; Tavares 33'

Umpires:
Nick Bennett (ENG)
Anton Kochin (RUS)

=== First to fourth place classification ===
Semi-finals
11 August
Scotland	4
Russia	3
11 August
Wales	4
France	3

Final
12 August
Scotland	2
Wales	1
Third place
12 August
Russia	4
France	5

==== Semi-finals ====
11 August 2017
16:30

Scotland	4–3	Russia
Bain 29'; Cosgrove 36'; Fraser 45'; Forsyth 49'	Report	Matkovskiy 50'; Plesetskii 55'; Komarov 59'

Umpires:
Eduardo Lizana (ESP)
Maksym Perepelytsya (UKR)

11 August 2017
14:00

Wales	4–3	France
Shipperley 13'; Carson 33'; Furlong 52'; Hawker 58'	Report	Baumgarten 23'; Charlet 56'; Deront 59'

Umpires:
Nick Bennett (ENG)
Fraser Bell (SCO)

==== Third and fourth place ====
12 August 2017
14:00

Russia	4–5	France
Laptev 6'; Golubev 37'; Khairullin 42'; Kuraev 45'	Report	Charlet 21'; Genestet 28'; Dumont 48' van Straaten 53'; Tynevez 55'

Umpires:
Jamie Hooper (WAL)
Tomas Holek (CZE)

==== Final ====
12 August 2017
16:30

Scotland	2–1	Wales
Cosgrove 49'; Forsyth 52'	Report	Carson 18'

Umpires:
Xavier Fenaert (FRA)
Maksym Perepelytsya (UKR)

== Final standings ==
Rank	Team
Gold medal	Scotland
Silver medal	Wales
Bronze medal	France
4	Russia
5	Ukraine
6	Czech Republic
7	Switzerland
8	Portugal

Qualified for the 2019 EuroHockey Championship

Relegated to the EuroHockey Championship III
