= 2015 Men's EuroHockey Championship II =

Field hockey tournament

Tournament details
- Host country: Czech Republic
- City: Prague
- Dates: 19–26 July
- Teams: 8 (from 1 confederation)
- Venue: SK Slavia Prague

Final positions
- Champions: Poland (2nd title)
- Runner-up: Austria
- Third place: Scotland

Tournament statistics
- Matches played: 20
- Goals scored: 100 (5 per match)
- Top scorer(s): (Scotland) Alan Forsyth (Ukraine) Viacheslav Paziuk (7 goals)

The 2015 Men's EuroHockey Championship II was the 6th edition of the Men's EuroHockey Championship II, the second level of the men's European field hockey championships organized by the European Hockey Federation. It was held from the 19th until the 27th of July 2015 in Prague, Czech Republic.

The tournament also served as a qualifier for the 2017 EuroHockey Championship, with the champions and runners-up Poland and Austria, respectively, qualifying.

== Qualified teams ==
Dates	Event	Location	Quotas	Qualifiers
17–25 August 2013	2013 EuroHockey Championship	Boom, Belgium	2	Czech Republic; Poland
3–11 August 2013	2013 EuroHockey Championship II	Vienna, Austria	4	Austria; Azerbaijan; Scotland; Ukraine
12–18 August 2013	2013 EuroHockey Championship III	Lausanne, Switzerland	2	Croatia; Switzerland
Total			8	

== Format ==
The eight teams were split into two groups of four teams. The top two teams advanced to the semifinals to determine the winner in a knockout system. The bottom two teams played in a new group with the teams they did not play against in the group stage.

== Results ==
All times were local (UTC+2).

=== Preliminary round ===
==== Pool A ====
Pos	Team	Pld	W	D	L	GF	GA	GD	Pts	Qualification
1	Poland	3	3	0	0	8	2	+6	9	Semi-finals
2	Scotland	3	2	0	1	13	5	+8	6	Semi-finals
3	Ukraine	3	1	0	2	13	14	−1	3	Relegation pool
4	Croatia	3	0	0	3	6	19	−13	0	Relegation pool

Source: FIH
Rules for classification: 1) points; 2) goal difference; 3) goals scored; 4) head-to-head result.

19 July 2015
09:00

Poland	2–1	Scotland
Makowski 59'; Bratkowski 70+'	Report	A. Forsyth 37'

Umpires:
Michael Eilmer (AUT)
Chahir Panschiri (SUI)

19 July 2015
11:15

Ukraine	10–5	Croatia
Kalinchuk 4'; Paziuk 7', 16', 41', 46'; Nechepa 16'; Popovchenko 30'; Mazurkevych 51'; Polishchuk 66'; Serdiuk 70+'	Report	A. Snoj 21'; Tausan 35+', 61', 68'; M. Cvetko 37'

Umpires:
Stepan Podmol (CZE)
Dave Dowdall (ENG)

20 July 2015
11:00

Scotland	6–0	Croatia
A. Forsyth 2', 21', 47', 60'; Adams 23'; Coultas 52'	Report

Umpires:
Michael Eilmer (AUT)
Stepan Podmol (CZE)

20 July 2015
13:15

Ukraine	0–3	Poland
	Report	Bratkowski 20'; Wejerowski 30'; Majchrzak 54'

Umpires:
Ben De Young (AUS)
Chahir Panschiri (SUI)

22 July 2015
11:00

Poland	3–1	Croatia
Gumny 14'; Bratkowski 27', 53'	Report	Tausan 7'

Umpires:
Stepan Podmol (CZE)
Chahir Panschiri (SUI)

22 July 2015
13:15

Scotland	6–3	Ukraine
Imrie 6'; Stott 19'; A. Forsyth 56'; Bain 58', 64'; McIntyre 68'	Report	Paziuk 13', 16'; Mazurkevych 50'

Umpires:
Ben De Young (AUS)
Michael Eilmer (AUT)

==== Pool B ====
Pos	Team	Pld	W	D	L	GF	GA	GD	Pts	Qualification
1	Austria	3	2	1	0	7	1	+6	7	Semi-finals
2	Czech Republic (H)	3	2	0	1	5	3	+2	6	Semi-finals
3	Azerbaijan	3	1	1	1	3	3	0	4	Relegation pool
4	Switzerland	3	0	0	3	1	9	−8	0	Relegation pool

Source: FIH
Rules for classification: 1) points; 2) goal difference; 3) goals scored; 4) head-to-head result.
(H) Hosts

18 July 2015
18:00

Czech Republic	2–0	Azerbaijan
Plochý 51', 52'	Report

Umpires:
Dave Dowdall (ENG)
Maksym Perepelytsya (UKR)

18 July 2015
20:15

Austria	4–0	Switzerland
Körper 16', 70'; Thörnblom 55'; A. Bele 59'	Report

Umpires:
Ben De Young (AUS)
Gavin Cruickshanks (SCO)

20 July 2015
15:30

Azerbaijan	2–0	Switzerland
Ghazanfar 10'; Satlikov 62'	Report

Umpires:
Maksym Perepelytsya (UKR)
Darko Koncic (CRO)

20 July 2015
17:45

Austria	2–0	Czech Republic
Eitenberger 51'; Hasun 52'	Report

Umpires:
Dave Dowdall (ENG)
Kris Cholewa (IRL)

22 July 2015
15:30

Azerbaijan	1–1	Austria
Satlikov 27'	Report	Körper 61'

Umpires:
Gavin Cruickshanks (SCO)
Darko Koncic (CRO)

22 July 2015
17:45

Czech Republic	3–1	Switzerland
Pauer 16'; Vudmaska 35'; Plochý 38'	Report	Messerli 63'

Umpires:
Maksym Perepelytsya (UKR)
Kris Cholewa (IRL)

=== Fifth to eighth place classification ===
==== Pool C ====
The points obtained in the preliminary round against the other team are taken over.

Pos	Team	Pld	W	D	L	GF	GA	GD	Pts	Relegation (Note: Due to suspension of the national association of Azerbaijan by the International Hockey Federation in November 2016 only the last team was relegated.)
5	Azerbaijan	3	2	0	1	10	6	+4	6	
6	Ukraine	3	2	0	1	16	13	+3	6	
7	Switzerland	3	1	0	2	10	7	+3	3	
8	Croatia	3	1	0	2	10	20	−10	3	EuroHockey Championship III

Source: FIH
Rules for classification: 1) points; 2) goal difference; 3) goals scored; 4) head-to-head result.
Notes:

24 July 2015
11:00

Croatia	1–7	Switzerland
Cefko 22'	Report	Hödle 9', 31'; Brönnimann 49', 59'; Messerli 54'; Reinhard 65'; Steffen 70'

Umpires:
Gavin Cruickshanks (SC)
Kris Cholewa (IRL)

24 July 2015
13:15

Ukraine	2–5	Azerbaijan
Nadirov 60'; Popovchenko 65'	Report	Khalid 12', 47'; Ghazanfar 49'; Nadirov 60'; Zai 64'

Umpires:
Darko Koncic (CRO)
Chahir Panschiri (SUI)

26 July 2015
08:00

Ukraine	4–3	Switzerland
Serdiuk 42', 68'; Kalinchuk 44'; Paziuk 66'	Report	Wullschleger 23'; Brönnimann 27'; Messerli 70+'

Umpires:
Michael Eilmer (AUT)
Gavin Cruickshanks (SCO)

26 July 2015
10:15

Azerbaijan	3–4	Croatia
Ghazanfar 5', 33'; Aziz 49'	Report	Cefko 34', 70'; Vuk 42'; Bachmann 65'

Umpires:
Stepan Podmol (CZE)
Maksym Perepelytsya (UKR)

=== First to fourth place classification ===
Semi-finals
24 July
Austria (p.s.o.)	1 (3)
Scotland	1 (1)
24 July
Poland	2
Czech Republic	1

Final
26 July
Austria	1
Poland	3
Third place
26 July
Scotland	5
Czech Republic	1

==== Semi-finals ====
24 July 2015
15:30

Austria	1–1	Scotland
A. Bele 38'	Report	Bain 53'
Penalties
B. Stanzl (penalty shoot-out scored); Rudofsky (penalty shoot-out scored); Fröhlich (penalty shoot-out missed); Thörnblom (penalty shoot-out scored)	3–1	(penalty shoot-out missed) McIntyre; (penalty shoot-out missed) Bain; (penalty shoot-out scored) Grassick; (penalty shoot-out missed) Imrie

Umpires:
Ben De Young (AUS)
Maksym Perepelytsya (UKR)

24 July 2015
17:45

Poland	2–1	Czech Republic
Ma. Poltaszewski 29'; Majchrzak 37'	Report	Bárta 60'

Umpires:
Dave Dowdall (ENG)
Michael Eilmer (AUT)

==== Third and fourth place ====
26 July 2015
12:45

Scotland	5–1	Czech Republic
Bain 15', 33', 37'; A. Forsyth 20'; Collins 67'	Report	Plochý 25'

Umpires:
Kris Cholewa (IRL)
Darko Koncic (CRO)

==== Final ====
26 July 2015
15:15

Austria	1–3	Poland
Uher 67'	Report	Wejerowski 38'; Majchrzak 43', 66'

Umpires:
Ben De Young (AUS)
Dave Dowdall (ENG)

== Final standings ==
Rank	Team
Gold medal	Poland
Silver medal	Austria
Bronze medal	Scotland
4	Czech Republic
5	Azerbaijan
6	Ukraine
7	Switzerland
8	Croatia

Qualified for the 2017 EuroHockey Championship

Relegated to the EuroHockey Championship III

== See also ==
- 2015 Men's EuroHockey Championship III
- 2015 Men's EuroHockey Nations Championship
- 2015 Women's EuroHockey Championship II
