= 2007 Men's EuroHockey Nations Challenge I =

Field hockey tournament

Tournament details
- Host country: Russia
- City: Kazan
- Dates: 9–15 September
- Teams: 6 (from 1 confederation)

Final positions
- Champions: Russia (1st title)
- Runner-up: Belarus
- Third place: Croatia

Tournament statistics
- Matches played: 14
- Goals scored: 89 (6.36 per match)

The 2007 Men's EuroHockey Nations Challenge I was the 2nd edition of the EuroHockey Nations Challenge I, the third level of the European field hockey championships organized by the European Hockey Federation. It was held from 9 to 15 September 2007 in Kazan, Russia.

The tournament also served as a qualifier for the 2009 Men's EuroHockey Nations Trophy, with the top two teams, Russia and Belarus, qualifying. As many as 89 goals were scored across the 14 matches of the tournament.

== Qualified teams ==
The following six teams, shown with pre-tournament world rankings, competed in the tournament.

Dates	Event	Location	Quotas	Qualifiers
11—17 September 2005	2005 EuroHockey Nations Trophy	Rome, Italy	2	Russia (45); Belarus (46)
11–17 September 2005	2005 EuroHockey Challenge I	Vinnitsya, Ukraine	2	Croatia (47); ~~Gibraltar~~; ~~Greece~~; Sweden (49)
5–10 September 2005	2005 EuroHockey Challenge II	Paola, Malta	2	Denmark (48); Azerbaijan (50)
Total			6	

== Results ==
All times are local (UTC+2).

=== Preliminary round ===
==== Pool A ====
Pos	Team	Pld	W	D	L	GF	GA	GD	Pts	Promotion
1	Russia (H)	5	5	0	0	32	5	+27	15	EuroHockey Nations Trophy
2	Belarus	5	3	1	1	22	14	+8	10	EuroHockey Nations Trophy
3	Croatia	5	3	1	1	16	12	+4	10	
4	Azerbaijan	5	2	0	3	9	19	−10	6	
5	Denmark	4	0	0	4	9	16	−7	0	
6	Sweden	4	0	0	4	1	23	−22	0	

Source: Todor66
(H) Hosts

9 September 2007

Russia	6–0	Azerbaijan

9 September 2007

Belarus	4–3	Denmark

9 September 2007

Sweden	0–2	Croatia

10 September 2007

Russia	5–2	Denmark

10 September 2007

Belarus	3–3	Croatia

10 September 2007

Sweden	1–3	Azerbaijan

12 September 2007

Belarus	10–0	Sweden

12 September 2007

Russia	5–2	Croatia

12 September 2007

Denmark	2–4	Azerbaijan

14 September 2007

Russia	8–0	Sweden

14 September 2007

Belarus	4–0	Azerbaijan

14 September 2007

Croatia	3–2	Denmark

15 September 2007

Russia	8–1	Belarus

15 September 2007

Croatia	6–2	Azerbaijan

15 September 2007

Sweden	cancelled	Denmark

== Final standings ==
Rank	Team
Gold medal	Russia
Silver medal	Belarus
Bronze medal	Croatia
4	Azerbaijan
5	Denmark
6	Sweden

Promoted to the EuroHockey Nations Trophy
