= Predanovci =

Predanovci Rónafő
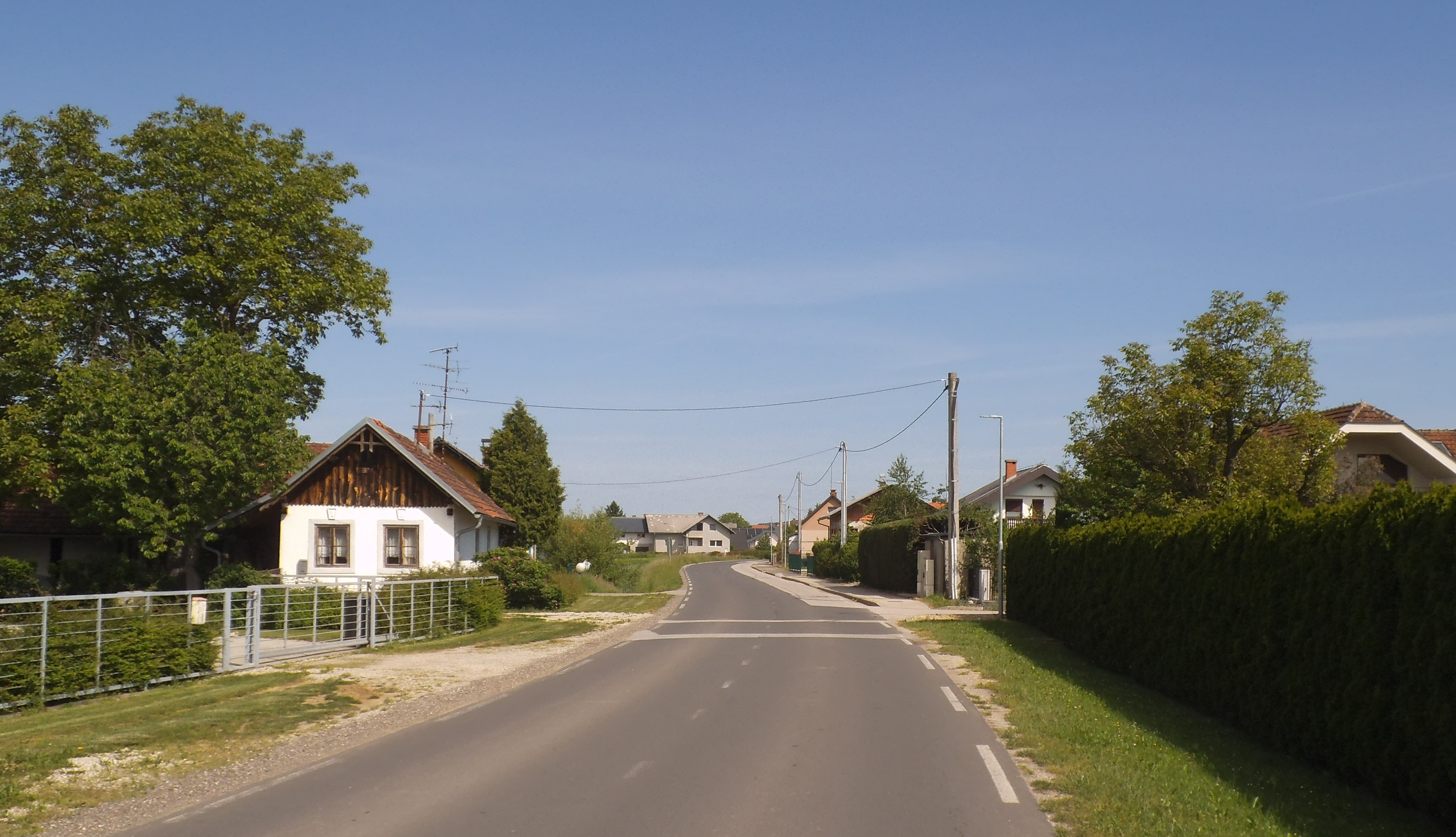

- Location in Slovenia
- Coordinates: 46°41′36.05″N 16°7′30.94″E
- Country: Slovenia
- Traditional region: Prekmurje
- Statistical region: Mura
- Municipality: Puconci

Area
  - Total: 3.53 km^{2} (1.36 sq mi)
- Elevation: 197.2 m (647 ft)

Population (2002)
  - Total: 189

Predanovci (pronounced [pɾɛˈdaːnɔu̯tsi]; in older sources also Bradanovci, Hungarian: Rónafő) is a roadside village in the Municipality of Puconci in the Prekmurje region of Slovenia.
