= Kelburne Hockey Club =

Scottish field hockey club

- Full name: Kelburne Hockey Club
- Nickname(s): The 'Burne
- League: Scottish Hockey National Leagues
- Founded: 1969 (56 years ago)
- Home ground: Whitehaugh (clubhouse); On-X Linwood & Glasgow National Hockey Centre (matches)
- Website: Official website
Home

Kelburne Hockey Club is a field hockey club based in Paisley, Scotland, and play their matches at On-X, Linwood but have their clubhouse at the Kelburne Crickey Club on Barshaw Drive. The club operates five senior men's teams, three senior women's teams and numerous junior teams at all age group levels. The men's team have been champions of Scotland a record 17 times.

== History ==
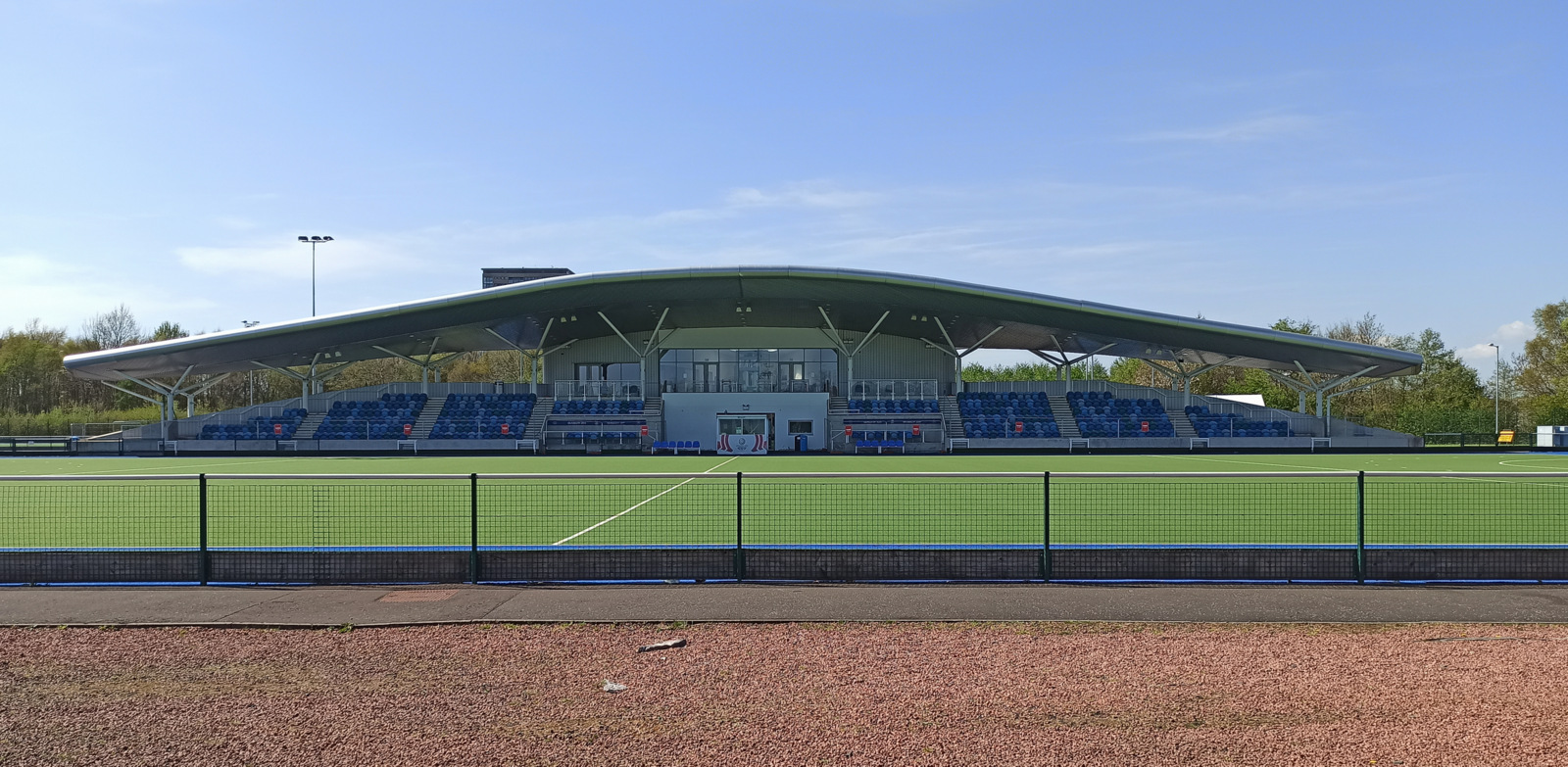
The National Hockey Centre

The club was founded in 1969 at accommodation at Whitehaugh, Paisley. The men's team quickly progressed through the divisions, winning National League 4 and National League 3 in 1979 and 1980 respectively before taking National League 2 title in 1985.

The team became champions of Scotland for the first time in 1990. The men's team continued their success, winning three more National League titles (1991, 1992 and 1994), Scottish Cup and European competitions. In season 1991–92 the club achieved the ‘Grand Slam of Scottish Hockey’ with all teams winning all SHU competitions entered.

After a quieter period, they were the SHU team of the year in 2005 and 2007, winning four Scottish Cups, two SHU European Playoffs, EHF European Cup in Austria and EHF European Club Championship in Switzerland. 2006/07 was an outstanding season when the team completing their domestic season as 'Undefeated Team of Scottish Hockey’ with an unprecedented 100% perfect record with all games won. The team also embarked on a 13 consecutive league title wins from 2005 to 2017 to set a record of 17 league titles.

In 2010, nine players from the club represented Scotland at the 2010 Commonwealth Games in Delhi.

In the Euro Hockey League the men have competed six times with the best performance reaching the last 16 twice losing to Uhlenhorster, the eventual winners, to a golden goal. The women has competed for European competition for the first time in their history in Rome.

== Honours ==
- Scottish champions:
- 1989-1990
- 1990-1991
- 1991-1992
- 1993-1994
- 2004-2005
- 2005-2006
- 2006-2007
- 2007-2008
- 2008-2009
- 2009-2010
- 2010-2011
- 2011-2012
- 2012-2013
- 2013-2014
- 2014-2015
- 2015-2016
- 2016-2017

== Notable players ==
=== Men's internationals ===
Extended content

Player	Events/notes	Ref
(Scotland) Thomas Austin	2022–2024	
(Scotland) Michael Bremner	CG (2014), EC (2011)	
(Scotland) Jonathan Christie	CG (2006)	
(Scotland) Michael Christie	CG (2006)	
(Scotland) Alan Forsyth	CG (2010)	
(Scotland) Gareth Hall	CG (2010), EC (2007, 2011)	
(Scotland) Gordon McIntyre	CG (2010)	
(Scotland) William Marshall	CG (2010), EC (2011)	
(Scotland) Chris Nelson	CG (2010, 2014), (EC 2005, 2011)	
(Scotland) Mark Ralph	CG (2006, 2010)	
(Scotland) Iain Scholefield	CG (2010), EC (2011)	
(Scotland) Niall Stott	CG (2006)	
(Scotland) Ross Stott	CG (2010)	

Key

- Oly = Olympic Games
- CG = Commonwealth Games
- WC = World Cup
- CT = Champions Trophy
- EC = European Championships
