= 2011 Men's EuroHockey Championship II =

Field hockey tournament

Tournament details
- Host country: Ukraine
- City: Vinnytsia
- Dates: 8–14 August
- Teams: 8 (from 1 confederation)

Final positions
- Champions: Czech Republic (1st title)
- Runner-up: Poland
- Third place: Scotland

Tournament statistics
- Matches played: 20
- Goals scored: 80 (4 per match)

The 2011 Men's EuroHockey Championship II was the 4th edition of the Men's EuroHockey Championship II, the second level of the European field hockey championships, and the first edition with the new name. It was held from the 8th until the 14th of August 2011 in Vinnytsia, Ukraine. The tournament also served as a qualifier for the 2013 EuroHockey Championship, with the finalists Czech Republic and Poland qualifying.

== Qualified teams ==
Dates	Event	Location	Quotas	Qualifiers
22–30 August 2009	2009 EuroHockey Championship	Amstelveen, Netherlands	2	Austria; Poland
1–8 August 2009	2009 EuroHockey Nations Trophy	Wrexham, Wales	4	Belarus; Czech Republic; Scotland; Wales
25–31 July 2009	2009 EuroHockey Challenge I	Zagreb, Croatia	2	Sweden; Ukraine
Total			8	

== Format ==
The eight teams were split into two groups of four teams. The top two teams advanced to the semifinals to determine the winner in a knockout system. The bottom two teams played in a new group with the teams they did not play against in the group stage. The last two teams were relegated to the Men's EuroHockey Championship III.

== Results ==
All times were local (UTC+2).

=== Preliminary round ===
==== Pool A ====
Pos	Team	Pld	W	D	L	GF	GA	GD	Pts	Qualification
1	Poland	3	2	0	1	8	2	+6	6	Semi-finals
2	Czech Republic	3	2	0	1	9	4	+5	6	Semi-finals
3	Wales	3	2	0	1	4	3	+1	6	Pool C
4	Sweden	3	0	0	3	1	13	−12	0	Pool C

Source: TheSports.org

8 August 2011

Poland	1–2	Wales

8 August 2011

Czech Republic	7–1	Sweden

10 August 2011

Czech Republic	0–2	Poland

10 August 2011

Wales	1–0	Sweden

11 August 2011

Wales	1–2	Czech Republic

11 August 2011

Poland	5–0	Sweden

==== Pool B ====
Pos	Team	Pld	W	D	L	GF	GA	GD	Pts	Qualification
1	Scotland	3	2	1	0	7	4	+3	7	Semi-finals
2	Austria	3	2	1	0	7	5	+2	7	Semi-finals
3	Ukraine (H)	3	1	0	2	8	7	+1	3	Pool C
4	Belarus	3	0	0	3	4	10	−6	0	Pool C

Source: TheSports.org
(H) Hosts

8 August 2011

Austria	2–1	Belarus

8 August 2011

Scotland	2–1	Ukraine

10 August 2011

Scotland	2–2	Austria

10 August 2011

Belarus	2–5	Ukraine

11 August 2011

Belarus	1–3	Scotland

11 August 2011

Austria	3–2	Ukraine

=== Fifth to eighth place classification ===
==== Pool C ====
The points obtained in the preliminary round against the other team are taken over.

Pos	Team	Pld	W	D	L	GF	GA	GD	Pts	Relegation
5	Ukraine (H)	3	3	0	0	10	5	+5	9	
6	Wales	3	2	0	1	4	3	+1	6	
7	Sweden	3	0	1	2	5	7	−2	1	EuroHockey Championship III
8	Belarus	3	0	1	2	6	10	−4	1	EuroHockey Championship III

Source: TheSports.org
(H) Hosts

13 August 2011

Wales	0–1	Ukraine

13 August 2011

Sweden	2–2	Belarus

14 August 2011

Sweden	3–4	Ukraine

14 August 2011

Wales	3–2	Belarus

=== First to fourth place classification ===
Semi-finals
13 August
Czech Republic	2
Scotland	0
13 August
Poland	3
Austria	1

Final
14 August
Czech Republic (p.s.o.)	1 (2)
Poland	1 (1)
Third place
14 August
Scotland	4
Austria	3

==== Semi-finals ====
13 August 2011

Czech Republic	2–0	Scotland

13 August 2011

Poland	3–1	Austria

==== Third place game ====
14 August 2011

Scotland	4–3	Austria

==== Final ====
14 August 2011

Czech Republic	1–1	Poland
Penalties
	2–1

== Final standings ==
Rank	Team
Gold medal	Czech Republic
Silver medal	Poland
Bronze medal	Scotland
4	Austria
5	Ukraine
6	Wales
7	Sweden
8	Belarus

Qualified for the 2013 EuroHockey Championship

Relegated to the EuroHockey Championship III

== See also ==
- 2011 Men's EuroHockey Championship III
- 2011 Men's EuroHockey Nations Championship
- 2011 Women's EuroHockey Championship II
