= EuroHockey Indoor Championships =

Sports competition

EuroHockey Indoor Nations Championship
- Sport: Indoor field hockey
- Founded: 1974
- No. of teams: 8
- Continent: Europe (EHF)
- Most recent champions: Germany (men); Belarus (women)
- Most titles: M: Germany (17 titles); W: Germany (15 titles)

The EuroHockey Nations Championships are a European indoor field hockey competition organized by the European Hockey Federation (EHF). The tournament was started in 1974 for both men's competition and the women's competition.

In the men's competition, Germany is the most successful team, having won the tournament 12 times out of 13 between 1974 and 2008. For women, Germany is also the most successful team, having won all titles but one between 1974 and 2008. The only national team beside Germany to win the men's competition between 1974 and 2008 is Russia, having done so in 2008 by defeating Germany in the gold medal game. The only team beside Germany to win the women's competition between 1974 and 2008 is England, having done so in 1996 by defeating Germany in the gold medal game. The 2010 edition of the men's tournament is the first to not feature Germany in the top four.

== Men's results ==
=== Championship I ===
==== Medal summary ====
Rank	Nation	Gold	Silver	Bronze	Total
1	Germany	17	1	1	19
2	Austria	2	3	3	8
3	Russia	1	1	2	4
4	Poland	0	3	1	4
5	England	0	3	0	3
6	Netherlands	0	2	4	6
7	Belgium	0	2	1	3
7	Czech Republic	0	2	1	3
7	Spain	0	2	1	3
10	France	0	1	0	1
11	Switzerland	0	0	3	3
12	Scotland	0	0	2	2
13	Denmark	0	0	1	1
Totals (13 entries)		20	20	20	60

=== Championship II ===
- Eurohockey Indoor Nations Trophy (1997 to 2010)
- Eurohockey Indoor Nations Championships II (2012 to 2016)

Number	Year	Host	Teams Number	Champion	Runner-up	Third Place	Fourth Place
1	1997	(Portugal) Porto	7	Switzerland	Poland	Sweden	Portugal
2	1999	(Portugal) Porto	5	France	Portugal	Scotland	Croatia
3	2001	(Austria) Vienna	8	Netherlands	Russia	Austria	Scotland
4	2003	(Croatia) Zagreb	8	Denmark	Austria	Portugal	Scotland
5	2006	(Italy) La Spezia	8	Russia	Italy	Ukraine	Portugal
6	2008	(Denmark) Copenhagen	8	Netherlands	Denmark	Slovakia	Portugal
7	2010	(Poland) Poznań	8	England	Switzerland	Poland	Sweden
8	2012	(Italy) Lignano	8	Poland	Sweden	Ukraine	Denmark
9	2014	(Switzerland) Bern	8	France	Switzerland	Ukraine	Denmark
10	2016	(Portugal) Espinho	8	Belgium	Denmark	England	France
11	2018	(Turkey) Alanya	8	Netherlands	Ukraine	Sweden	Croatia
12	2020	(Switzerland) Lucerne	8	Switzerland	Belarus	Portugal	Croatia
13	2022	(Portugal) Paredes	7	Spain	Poland	Croatia	Ukraine
14–A	2024	(Portugal) Paredes	5	Ireland	Denmark	Lithuania	Cyprus
14–B	2024	(Hungary) Budapest	7	Turkey	Italy	Slovakia	Hungary
15–A	2026	(Croatia) Sveti Ivan Zelina	5	Croatia	Denmark	Slovakia	Hungary
15–B	2026	(Norway) Oslo	6	Italy	Ukraine	Lithuania	Greece

=== Championship III ===
- Eurohockey Indoor Nations Challenge I (2003 to 2010)
- Eurohockey Indoor Nations Championship III (2012 to 2016)

Number	Year	Host	Teams Number	Champion	Runner-up	Third Place	Fourth Place
1	2003	(Italy) Brescia	4	Italy	Belgium	Slovenia	Georgia
2	2006	(Bulgaria) Sofia	5	Belarus	Sweden	Finland	Lithuania
3	2008	(England) Sheffield	6	Sweden	England	Croatia	Turkey
4	2010	(Turkey) Alanya	5	Ukraine	Croatia	Turkey	Hungary
5	2012	(Portugal) Gondomar	8	France	Belgium	Portugal	Croatia
6	2014	(Croatia) Sveti Ivan Zelina	6	Portugal	Croatia	Wales	Turkey
7	2016	(Finland) Vantaa	6	Italy	Turkey	Belarus	Slovakia
8	2018	(Cyprus) Nicosia	7	Belarus	Slovakia	Scotland	Wales
9	2020	(Spain) Santander	5	Spain	Scotland	Ireland	Wales

=== Championship IV ===
- Eurohockey Indoor Nations Challenge II (2010)

Number	Year	Host	Teams Number	Champion	Runner-up	Third Place	Fourth Place
1	2010	(France) Rouen	4	France	Wales	Finland	Norway

== Women's results ==
=== Medal summary ===
Rank	Nation	Gold	Silver	Bronze	Total
1	Germany	15	2	1	18
2	Netherlands	2	8	1	11
3	Belarus	1	2	4	7
4	England	1	2	2	5
5	Ukraine	1	0	0	1
6	Spain	0	2	2	4
7	Poland	0	1	2	3
8	Scotland	0	1	1	2
9	Lithuania	0	1	0	1
9	Russia	0	1	0	1
11	Belgium	0	0	2	2
11	Czech Republic	0	0	2	2
13	Austria	0	0	1	1
13	Canada	0	0	1	1
13	France	0	0	1	1
Totals (15 entries)		20	20	20	60

=== Division II ===
- Eurohockey Indoor Nations Trophy (1996 to 2010)

=== Division III ===
- Eurohockey Indoor Nations Challenge (1996 to 2010)
- Eurohockey Indoor Nations Championship III (2012 to 2014)

Number	Year	Host	Teams Number	Champion	Runner-up	Third Place	Fourth Place
1	1996	(Czech Republic) Prague	6	Russia	Lithuania	Czech Republic	Belgium
2	1998	(Denmark) Slagelse	6	Czech Republic	Belarus	Ukraine	France
3	2000	(France) Liévin	6	Lithuania	France	Poland	Denmark
4	2002	(Netherlands) Rotterdam	5	Netherlands	Belarus	Poland	Switzerland
5	2008	(England) Sheffield	4	Denmark	England	Turkey	Sweden
6	2010	(France) Rouen	6	England	France	Sweden	Croatia
7	2012	(Portugal) Gondomar	7	Belgium	Wales	Italy	Sweden
8	2014	(Croatia) Poreč	5	Croatia	Turkey	Sweden	Bulgaria
9	2018	(Slovenia) Apače	3	Turkey	Slovakia	Slovenia	—
10	2020	(Slovakia) Bratislava	7	Spain	Ireland	Portugal	Slovakia
11	2022	(Slovakia) Bratislava	3	Italy	Slovakia	Portugal	

== See also ==
- EuroHockey Nations Championship
- Indoor Hockey World Cup
- Results Details 1
- Results Details 2
- EuroHockey Nations Trophy
- EuroHockey Nations Challenge
