= 2023 Men's EuroHockey Championship Qualifiers =

Field hockey tournament

Tournament details
- Host countries: Spain; France; Austria; Scotland
- Dates: 17–27 August 2022
- Teams: 16 (from 1 confederation)
- Venue: 4 (in 4 host cities)

Tournament statistics
- Matches played: 18
- Goals scored: 193 (10.72 per match)
- Top scorer: (Ukraine) Andrii Koshelenko (8 goals)

The 2023 Men's EuroHockey Championship Qualifiers was a series of 4 qualification events for the 2023 EuroHockey Championships in Mönchengladbach. The tournaments were held in Spain, France, Austria and Scotland between 17 and 27 August 2022.

The top team from each tournament qualified for the EuroHockey Championships. The second and third ranked teams from each group advanced to the EuroHockey Championship II, with the remaining teams advancing to the EuroHockey Championship III.

== Qualification ==
All eligible teams from the 2021 editions of the EuroHockey Championships II and III will participate, as well as the four lowest ranked teams from the EuroHockey Championships.

Dates	Event	Location	Quotas	Qualifier(s)
5–13 June 2021	EuroHockey Championship	Amsterdam, Netherlands	3	Spain; France; ~~Russia~~^{[a]} Wales
1–7 August 2021	EuroHockey Championship III	Lousada, Portugal	4	~~Belarus~~^{[a]} Czech Republic; Lithuania; Portugal; Turkey
15–21 August 2021	EuroHockey Championship II	Gniezno, Poland	8	Austria; Croatia; Ireland; Italy; Poland; Scotland; Switzerland; Ukraine
15 February 2022	World rankings	—N/a	1	Gibraltar
Total			16	

^[a] – Belarus and Russia were precluded from the tournament due to the Russian invasion of Ukraine.

== Qualifier A ==
Tournament details
- Host country: Spain
- City: Ourense
- Dates: 17–20 August
- Teams: 4 (from 1 confederation)
- Venue: Campo Hockey Herba Mariñamansa

Final positions
- Champions: Spain
- Runner-up: Czech Republic
- Third place: Portugal

Tournament statistics
- Matches played: 6
- Goals scored: 35 (5.83 per match)
- Top scorer: (Czech Republic) Lukas Plochý (4 goals)

Qualifier A was held in Ourense, Spain from 17 to 20 August 2022.

=== Standings ===
Pos	Team	Pld	W	D	L	GF	GA	GD	Pts	Qualification
1	Spain (H)	3	3	0	0	20	0	+20	9	2023 EuroHockey Championship
2	Czech Republic	3	2	0	1	8	9	−1	6	2023 EuroHockey Championship II
3	Portugal	3	1	0	2	4	18	−14	3	2023 EuroHockey Championship II
4	Poland	3	0	0	3	3	8	−5	0	2023 EuroHockey Championship III

Source: FIH
Rules for classification: 1) points; 2) matches won; 3) goal difference; 4) goals for; 5) head-to-head result; 6) field goals for.
(H) Hosts

=== Results ===
17 August 2022
18:15

Poland	2–3	Portugal
Rutkowski 19'; Jarzyński 57'	Report	Ribeiro 17', 46'; Franco 27'

Umpires:
David Sweetman (SCO)
Harrison Collinson (ENG)

17 August 2022
20:30

Spain	7–0	Czech Republic
De Ignacio-Simó 15'; Reyné 30'; Cunill 36'; Menini 37', 49'; Iglesias 43'; Miralles 48'	Report

Umpires:
Maarten Boxma (NED)
Daniel Denta (DEN)

18 August 2022
18:15

Czech Republic	5–1	Portugal
Soukup 14'; Plochý 33', 43'; Capouch 38'; Uhlíř 43'	Report	Ribeiro 2'

Umpires:
David Sweetman (SCO)
Maarten Boxma (NED)

18 August 2022
20:30

Poland	0–2	Spain
	Report	Iglesias 17'; González 41'

Umpires:
Harrison Collinson (ENG)
Daniel Denta (DEN)

20 August 2022
09:45

Czech Republic	3–1	Poland
Plochý 13', 18'; Soukup 17'	Report	Głowacki 43'

Umpires:
Maarten Boxma (NED)
Harry Collinson (ENG)

20 August 2022
12:00

Spain	11–0	Portugal
Menini 3'; Basterra 7', 60'; Cunill 8', 22'; Iglesias 11'; Reyné 13'; Gispert 30'; Bonastre 32'; Salvador 44'; Recasens 48'	Report

Umpires:
Daniel Denta (DEN)
David Sweetman (SCO)

== Qualifier B ==
Tournament details
- Host country: France
- City: Calais
- Dates: 24–27 August
- Teams: 4 (from 1 confederation)
- Venue: Le Sporting Tennis Club de Calais

Final positions
- Champions: France
- Runner-up: Ireland
- Third place: Turkey

Tournament statistics
- Matches played: 6
- Goals scored: 72 (12 per match)
- Top scorer: (France) Timothée Clément (8 goals)

Qualifier B was held in Calais, France from 24 to 27 August 2022.

=== Standings ===
Pos	Team	Pld	W	D	L	GF	GA	GD	Pts	Qualification
1	France (H)	3	3	0	0	37	3	+34	9	2023 EuroHockey Championship
2	Ireland	3	2	0	1	29	4	+25	6	2023 EuroHockey Championship II
3	Turkey	3	1	0	2	5	24	−19	3	2023 EuroHockey Championship II
4	Lithuania	3	0	0	3	1	41	−40	0	2023 EuroHockey Championship III

Source: FIH
Rules for classification: 1) points; 2) matches won; 3) goal difference; 4) goals for; 5) head-to-head result; 6) field goals for.
(H) Hosts

=== Results ===
24 August 2022
16:45

Ireland	19–0	Lithuania
Madeley 1', 37', 48', 52'; Murray 14'; Duncan 14', 33', 33'; McKee 15', 45+', 57'; Walker 17', 32', 53'; Walsh 42'; M. Robson 44', 54', 55'; Witherow 58'	Report

Umpires:
Nicholas Bennett (ENG)
Andrés Ortíz (ESP)

24 August 2022
19:00

France	14–2	Turkey
Charlet 3', 30', 35', 46', 52'; Tynevez 19'; Clément 27', 32', 45', 47', 60'; Martin-Brisac 51'; Marqué 51'; Rogeau 56'	Report	Elagöz 43'; Kayar 60+'

Umpires:
Daniel Veerman (NED)
Duncan Ruzzak (SCO)

25 August 2022
17:45

Turkey	3–1	Lithuania
Ataş 21'; Demirel 54'; Aydin 58'	Report	Sinkevičius 21'

Umpires:
Daniel Veerman (NED)
Andrés Ortíz (ESP)

25 August 2022
20:00

Ireland	1–4	France
Madeley 44'	Report	Baumgarten 5'; Sellier 7'; Tynevez 32', 38'

Umpires:
Sébastien Michielsen (BEL)
Nick Bennett (ENG)

27 August 2022
10:00

Turkey	0–9	Ireland
	Report	Murray 4', 44'; McKee 34', 43'; Walker 41', 54', 60'; M. Robson 51'; Madeley 60'

Umpires:
Andrés Ortíz (ESP)
Daniel Veerman (NED)

27 August 2022
12:15

France	19–0	Lithuania
Baumgarten 5', 47'; Charlet 6', 60+'; Rogeau 8', 42'; Tynevez 16', 39'; Clément 20', 44', 55'; Marqué 21'; Martin-Brisac 23'; Curty 23'; Sellier 24', 28', 42', 43'; Lockwood 27'	Report

Umpires:
Nick Bennett (ENG)
Sébastien Michielsen (BEL)

== Qualifier C ==
Tournament details
- Host country: Austria
- City: Vienna
- Dates: 23–26 August
- Teams: 4 (from 1 confederation)
- Venue: HC Wien

Final positions
- Champions: Austria
- Runner-up: Italy
- Third place: Ukraine

Tournament statistics
- Matches played: 6
- Goals scored: 44 (7.33 per match)
- Top scorer: (Ukraine) Andrii Koshelenko (9 goals)

Qualifier C was held in Vienna, Austria from 23 to 26 August 2022.

=== Standings ===
Pos	Team	Pld	W	D	L	GF	GA	GD	Pts	Qualification
1	Austria (H)	3	3	0	0	15	3	+12	9	2023 EuroHockey Championship
2	Italy	3	2	0	1	9	9	0	6	2023 EuroHockey Championship II
3	Ukraine	3	1	0	2	14	12	+2	3	2023 EuroHockey Championship II
4	Croatia	3	0	0	3	6	20	−14	0	2023 EuroHockey Championship III

Source: FIH
Rules for classification: 1) points; 2) matches won; 3) goal difference; 4) goals for; 5) head-to-head result; 6) field goals for.
(H) Hosts

=== Results ===
23 August 2022
16:15

Italy	5–3	Croatia
Mondo 7', 19'; Moretto 24'; Sior 25', 43'	Report	Krleža 10'; Zlatar 18'; Mucić 42'

Umpires:
Friedrich Weiland (AUT)
Jakub Mejzlik (CZE)

23 August 2022
18:30

Austria	5–3	Ukraine
Körper 9', 27'; Losonci 25'; Soldat 43'; Frey 58'	Report	Paziuk 36'; Koshelenko 43', 59'

Umpires:
Michael Dutrieux (BEL)
Daniel Rodríguez (ESP)

24 August 2022
16:15

Ukraine	8–3	Croatia
Koshelenko 3', 11', 12', 39', 41', 49'; Shevchuk 19'; Kovalenko 44'	Report	Mucić 23'; Mesarić 25'; Zlatar 36'

Umpires:
Timothy Meissner (GER)
Michael Dutrieux (BEL)

24 August 2022
18:30

Italy	0–3	Austria
	Report	Körper 10', 50', 55'

Umpires:
Jakub Mejzlik (CZE)
Daniel Rodríguez (ESP)

26 August 2022
09:45

Ukraine	3–4	Italy
Kaplinskyi 15'; Koshelenko 55'; Onofriiuk 57'	Report	Keenan 6', 52', 60+'; Sior 60'

Umpires:
Daniel Rodríguez (ESP)
Tim Meissner (GER)

26 August 2022
12:00

Austria	7–0	Croatia
Körper 9', 57'; Frey 11', 46'; Uher 34', 37', 52'	Report

Umpires:
Michael Dutrieux (BEL)
Jakub Mejzlik (CZE)

== Qualifier D ==
Tournament details
- Host country: Scotland
- City: Glasgow
- Dates: 24–27 August
- Teams: 4 (from 1 confederation)
- Venue: Uddingston Hockey Club

Final positions
- Champions: Wales
- Runner-up: Scotland
- Third place: Switzerland

Tournament statistics
- Matches played: 6
- Goals scored: 42 (7 per match)
- Top scorer: (Wales) Gareth Furlong (8 goals)

Qualifier D was held in Glasgow, Scotland from 24 to 27 August 2022.

=== Standings ===
Pos	Team	Pld	W	D	L	GF	GA	GD	Pts	Qualification
1	Wales	3	3	0	0	16	0	+16	9	2023 EuroHockey Championship
2	Scotland (H)	3	2	0	1	17	1	+16	6	2023 EuroHockey Championship II
3	Switzerland	3	1	0	2	7	18	−11	3	2023 EuroHockey Championship II
4	Gibraltar	3	0	0	3	2	23	−21	0	2023 EuroHockey Championship III

Source: FIH
Rules for classification: 1) points; 2) matches won; 3) goal difference; 4) goals for; 5) head-to-head result; 6) field goals for.
(H) Hosts

=== Results ===
24 August 2022
16:45

Wales	8–0	Switzerland
Shipperley 3', 36', 55'; Morgan 24'; G. Furlong 29', 29', 41', 60'	Report

Umpires:
Paul Walker (ENG)
Fraser Bell (SCO)

24 August 2022
19:00

Scotland	9–0	Gibraltar
Golden 3', 35', 59'; Harwood 6', 27', 59'; Walker 18', 21', 28'	Report

Umpires:
Jaroslav Suchocki (LTU)
Xavier Fenaert (FRA)

25 August 2022
16:45

Switzerland	7–2	Gibraltar
Grandchamp 5'; Winkler 16'; Brönnimann 21', 32', 39', 57'; Krüsi 32'	Report	Lopez 8'; J. Hernandez 20'

Umpires:
Fraser Bell (SCO)
Malcolm Coombes (IRL)

25 August 2022
19:00

Scotland	0–1	Wales
	Report	G. Furlong 27'

Umpires:
Paul Walker (ENG)
Xavier Fenaert (FRA)

27 August 2022
10:45

Wales	7–0	Gibraltar
G. Furlong 3', 15+', 17'; Carson 30'; Hawker 35'; Newbold 46'; Kyriakides 54'	Report

Umpires:
Jaroslav Suchocki (LTU)
Fraser Bell (SCO)

27 August 2022
13:00

Switzerland	0–8	Scotland
	Report	Morton 30', 51'; Nairn 36'; Golden 36', 37'; Walker 45'; Harwood 50'; Forsyth 59'

Umpires:
Paul Walker (ENG)
Malcolm Coombes (IRL)

== Goalscorers ==
There were 193 goals scored in 18 matches, for an average of 10.7 goals per match.

9 goals

- (Ukraine) Andrii Koshelenko

8 goals

- (France) Timothée Clément
- (Wales) Gareth Furlong

7 goals

- (Austria) Michael Körper
- (France) Victor Charlet

6 goals

- (Ireland) Luke Madeley
- (Ireland) Ben Walker

5 goals

- (France) Corentin Sellier
- (France) Etienne Tynevez
- (Ireland) John McKee
- (Scotland) Jamie Golden

4 goals

- (Czech Republic) Lukas Plochý
- (Ireland) Michael Robson
- (Scotland) Rob Harwood
- (Scotland) Struan Walker
- (Switzerland) Elias Brönnimann

3 goals

- (Austria) Moritz Frey
- (Austria) Dominic Uher
- (France) Gaspard Baumgarten
- (France) Blaise Rogeau
- (Ireland) Jeremy Duncan
- (Ireland) Sean Murray
- (Italy) Thomas Keenan
- (Italy) François Sior
- (Portugal) Vasco Ribeiro
- (Spain) Pau Cunill
- (Spain) Álvaro Iglesias
- (Spain) Joaquín Menini
- (Wales) Rupert Shipperley

2 goals

- (Croatia) Mario Mucić
- (Croatia) Fran Zlatar
- (Czech Republic) Vít Soukup
- (France) Benjamin Marqué
- (France) Simon Martin-Brisac
- (Italy) Manuel Mondo
- (Scotland) Lee Morton
- (Spain) José Basterra
- (Spain) Marc Reyné

1 goal

- (Austria) Fülöp Losonci
- (Austria) Christoph Soldat
- (Croatia) Josip Krleža
- (Croatia) Luka Mesarić
- (Czech Republic) Martin Capouch
- (Czech Republic) Adam Uhlíř
- (France) Eliot Curty
- (France) Viktor Lockwood
- (Gibraltar) Julian Hernandez
- (Gibraltar) Julian Lopez
- (Ireland) Daragh Walsh
- (Ireland) Luke Witherow
- (Italy) Marco Moretto
- (Lithuania) Povilas Sinkevičius
- (Poland) Gracjan Jarzyński
- (Poland) Mikołaj Głowacki
- (Poland) Wojciech Rutkowski
- (Portugal) David Franco
- (Scotland) Alan Forsyth
- (Scotland) David Nairn
- (Spain) Jordi Bonastre
- (Spain) Xavier Gispert
- (Spain) Enrique González
- (Spain) Eduard de Ignacio-Simó
- (Spain) Marc Miralles
- (Spain) Marc Recasens
- (Spain) Oriol Salvador
- (Switzerland) Loris Grandchamp
- (Switzerland) Patrick Krüsi
- (Switzerland) Jonas Winkler
- (Turkey) Furkan Ataş
- (Turkey) Celal Aydin
- (Turkey) Mehmet Demirel
- (Turkey) Müslüm Elagöz
- (Turkey) Ramazan Kayar
- (Ukraine) Volodymyr Kaplinskyi
- (Ukraine) Bohdan Kovalenko
- (Ukraine) Maksym Onofriiuk
- (Ukraine) Viacheslav Paziuk
- (Ukraine) Vitalii Shevchuk
- (Wales) James Carson
- (Wales) Luke Hawker
- (Wales) Daniel Kyriakides
- (Wales) Jolyon Morgan
- (Wales) Fred Newbold

== See also ==
- 2023 Women's EuroHockey Championship Qualifiers
