= Men's EuroHockey Championship III =

- Most recent season or competition: 2025 Men's EuroHockey Championship III
- Formerly: Men's EuroHockey Nations Challenge I
- Sport: Field hockey
- Founded: 2005; 21 years ago
- First season: 2005
- No. of teams: 8
- Confederation: EHF (Europe)
- Most recent champion: Ukraine (3rd title) (2025)
- Most titles: Ukraine (3 titles)
- Level on pyramid: 3

The Men's EuroHockey Championship III, formerly known as the Men's EuroHockey Nations Challenge I, is a competition for European national field hockey teams. It is the third level of European field hockey Championships for national teams.

Underneath the Championship III there exists at least one division of the EuroHockey Nations Challenge, like EuroHockey Championship IV. There is promotion and relegation. The two first ranked teams qualify for the next EuroHockey Championship II and are replaced by the two lowest-ranked teams from that tournament. The teams finishing in seventh and eighth positions are relegated to the EuroHockey Championship IV and replaced by the first or two highest-ranked from that tournament.

The tournament has been won by eight different teams: Ukraine have the most titles with three followed by Belarus who have two and Azerbaijan, Croatia, Poland, Russia, Switzerland and Wales have all won the tournament once. The most recent edition was held in Kırklareli, Turkey and was won by Ukraine.

== Results ==
Year	Host	Final			Third place match			Number of teams
Year	Host	Winner	Score	Runner-up	Third place	Score	Fourth place	Number of teams
2005; Details	Vinnytsia, Ukraine	Ukraine	2–0	Portugal	Gibraltar	5–3	Croatia	7
2007; Details	Kazan, Russia	Russia	Round-robin	Belarus	Croatia	Round-robin	Azerbaijan	6
2009; Details	Zagreb, Croatia	Ukraine	3–0	Sweden	Portugal	2–1	Azerbaijan	7
2011; Details	Catania, Italy	Azerbaijan	3–2	Italy	Gibraltar	5–4	Switzerland	7
2013; Details	Lausanne, Switzerland	Switzerland	7–1	Croatia	Belarus	7–6	Portugal	8
2015; Details	Lisbon, Portugal	Wales	1–1 (2–0 s.o.)	Portugal	Italy	7–3	Belarus	6
2017; Details	Sveti Ivan Zelina, Croatia	Belarus	1–1 (3–2 s.o.)	Italy	Croatia	3–1	Turkey	7
2019; Details	Gibraltar	Croatia	5–4	Switzerland	Gibraltar	7–2	Portugal	8
2021; Details	Lousada, Portugal	Belarus	4–0	Czech Republic	Turkey	3–3 (4–3 s.o.)	Portugal	7
2023; Details	Skierniewice, Poland	Poland	Round-robin	Croatia	Gibraltar	Round-robin	Malta	6
2025; Details	Kırklareli, Turkey	Ukraine	9–5	Turkey	Lithuania	3–1	Bulgaria	8

=== Summary ===
Team	Winners	Runners-up	Third place	Fourth place
Ukraine	3 (2005*, 2009, 2025)			
Belarus	2 (2017, 2021)	1 (2007)	1 (2013)	1 (2015)
Croatia	1 (2019)	2 (2013, 2023)	2 (2007, 2017*)	1 (2005)
Switzerland	1 (2013*)	1 (2019)		1 (2011)
Azerbaijan	1 (2011)			2 (2007, 2009)
Poland	1 (2023*)			
Russia	1 (2007*)			
Wales	1 (2015)			
Portugal		2 (2005, 2015*)	1 (2009)	3 (2013, 2019, 2021*)
Italy		2 (2011*, 2017)	1 (2015)	
Turkey		1 (2025*)	1 (2021)	1 (2017)
Sweden		1 (2009)		
Czech Republic		1 (2021)		
Gibraltar			4 (2005, 2011, 2019*, 2023)	
Lithuania			1 (2025)	
Malta				1 (2023)
Bulgaria				1 (2025)

* = host nation

=== Team appearances ===
Team	(Ukraine) 2005	(Russia) 2007	(Croatia) 2009	(Italy) 2011	(Switzerland) 2013	(Portugal) 2015	(Croatia) 2017	(Gibraltar) 2019	(Portugal) 2021	(Poland) 2023	(Turkey) 2025	Total
Azerbaijan	–	4th	4th	1st	–	–	–	–	–	–	–	3
Belarus	–	2nd	–	–	3rd	4th	1st	–	1st	–	–	5
Bulgaria	–	–	–	–	–	–	–	–	–	–	4th	1
Croatia	4th	3rd	5th	5th	2nd	–	3rd	1st	–	2nd	–	8
Czech Republic	–	–	–	–	–	–	–	–	2nd	–	–	1
Denmark	–	5th	7th	–	–	–	–	–	–	–	–	2
Finland	–	–	–	–	–	–	–	–	–	–	5th	1
Gibraltar	3rd	–	–	3rd	5th	–	–	3rd	WD	3rd	WD	5
Greece	5th	–	–	–	–	–	–	–	–	–	–	1
Hungary	7th	–	–	–	–	–	–	–	WD	–	7th	2
Italy	–	–	–	2nd	–	3rd	2nd	–	–	–	–	3
Lithuania	–	–	–	–	–	–	6th	7th	6th	5th	3rd	5
Luxembourg	–	–	–	–	–	–	–	–	–	–	8th	1
Malta	–	–	–	–	–	–	5th	8th	7th	4th	6th	5
Poland	–	–	–	–	–	–	–	–	–	1st	–	1
Portugal	2nd	–	3rd	6th	4th	2nd	–	4th	4th	–	–	7
Russia	–	1st	–	–	–	–	–	–	–	–	–	1
Serbia	–	–	–	–	–	–	–	–	–	6th	–	1
Slovakia	–	–	–	7th	8th	–	7th	6th	5th	–	–	5
Slovenia	–	–	6th	–	–	–	–	–	–	–	–	1
Sweden	6th	6th	2nd	–	6th	6th	–	–	–	–	–	5
Switzerland	–	–	–	4th	1st	–	–	2nd	–	–	–	3
Turkey	–	–	–	–	7th	5th	4th	5th	3rd	–	2nd	6
Ukraine	1st	–	1st	–	–	–	–	–	–	–	1st	3
Wales	–	–	–	–	–	1st	–	–	–	–	–	1
Total	7	6	7	7	8	6	7	8	7	6	8	

== See also ==
- Women's EuroHockey Championship III
- Men's EuroHockey Championship II
- EuroHockey Championship IV
