= 2013 Men's EuroHockey Championship II =

Field hockey tournament

Tournament details
- Host country: Austria
- City: Vienna
- Dates: 3–11 August
- Teams: 8 (from 1 confederation)
- Venue: Wiener Hockeystadion

Final positions
- Champions: Russia (1st title)
- Runner-up: France
- Third place: Austria

Tournament statistics
- Matches played: 20
- Goals scored: 101 (5.05 per match)

The 2013 Men's EuroHockey Championship II was the fifth edition of the Men's EuroHockey Championship II, the second level of the men's European field hockey championships organized by the European Hockey Federation. It was held from the 3rd until the 11th of August 2013 in Vienna, Austria.

The tournament also served as a qualifier for the 2015 EuroHockey Championship, with the finalists Russia and France qualifying.

== Qualified teams ==
Dates	Event	Location	Quotas	Qualifiers
20–28 August 2011	2011 EuroHockey Championship	Mönchengladbach, Germany	2	France; Russia
8–14 August 2011	2011 EuroHockey Championship II	Vinnytsia, Ukraine	4	Austria; Scotland; Ukraine; Wales
24–30 July 2011	2011 EuroHockey Championship III	Catania, Italy	2	Azerbaijan; Italy
Total			8	

== Format ==
The eight teams were split into two groups of four teams. The top two teams advanced to the semifinals to determine the winner in a knockout system. The bottom two teams played in a new group with the teams they did not play against in the group stage. The last two teams were relegated to the Men's EuroHockey Championship III.

== Preliminary round ==
All times were local (UTC+2).

=== Pool A ===
Pos	Team	Pld	W	D	L	GF	GA	GD	Pts	Qualification
1	France	3	2	0	1	12	8	+4	6	Semi-finals
2	Azerbaijan	3	2	0	1	7	5	+2	6	Semi-finals
3	Scotland	3	1	1	1	5	5	0	4	
4	Wales	3	0	1	2	4	10	−6	1	

Source: EuroHockey
Rules for classification: 1) points; 2) goal difference; 3) goals scored; 4) head-to-head result.

5 August 2013
11:00

France	7–2	Wales
Deront 9'; Sánchez 15'; H. Genestet 18', 41'; 33'; M. Genestet 62'; Kieffer 69'	Report	Naughalty 28', 58'

Umpires:
Moritz Meissner (GER)
Anton Kochin (RUS)

5 August 2013
13:00

Scotland	0–3	Azerbaijan
	Report	Butt Vagas 24', 67'; Khalid Muhammad 51'

Umpires:
Florian Hösch (AUT)
Pietro Galligani (ITA)

6 August 2013
15:00

Wales	1–2	Azerbaijan
Naughalty 21'	Report	Balamiyev 23'; Butt Vagas 57'

Umpires:
Anton Kochin (RUS)
Pietro Galligani (ITA)

6 August 2013
17:00

Scotland	4–1	France
A. Forsyth 28', 70'; Bain 34', 47'	Report	Martin-Brisac 27'

Umpires:
Coen van Bunge (NED)
Maksim Perepelitzka (UKR)

8 August 2013
11:00

France	4–2	Azerbaijan
	Report

Umpires:
Anton Kochin (RUS)
Florian Hösch (AUT)

8 August 2013
13:00

Wales	1–1	Scotland
Shaw 3'	Report	Byers 70'

Umpires:
Pietro Galligani (ITA)
Maksim Perepelitzka (UKR)

=== Pool B ===
Pos	Team	Pld	W	D	L	GF	GA	GD	Pts	Qualification
1	Russia	3	2	1	0	12	4	+8	7	Semi-finals
2	Austria (H)	3	2	1	0	6	3	+3	7	Semi-finals
3	Italy	3	0	1	2	6	10	−4	1	
4	Ukraine	3	0	1	2	5	12	−7	1	

Source: EuroHockey
Rules for classification: 1) points; 2) goal difference; 3) goals scored; 4) head-to-head result.
(H) Hosts

5 August 2013
15:00

Russia	6–1	Ukraine
	Report

Umpires:
Coen van Bunge (NED)
Neil McAlpine (SCO)

5 August 2013
17:00

Austria	2–1	Italy
Fröhlich 20'; Szmidt 47'	Report	Murgia 51'

Umpires:
Will Drury (WAL)
Hichem Azaiez (FRA)

7 August 2013
15:00

Ukraine	3–3	Italy
Ozerskyy 12'; Diachenko 33'; Moroz 38'	Report	18'; Murgia 46', 56'

Umpires:
Will Drury (WAL)
Elchin Qurbanov (AZE)

7 August 2013
17:00

Austria	1–1	Russia
Körper 64'	Report	49'

Umpires:
Neil McAlpine (SCO)
Hichem Azaiez (FRA)

8 August 2013
15:00

Russia	5–2	Italy
	Report

Umpires:
Hichem Azaiez (FRA)
Moritz Meissner (GER)

8 August 2013
17:00

Ukraine	1–3	Austria
61'	Report	Podpera 10'; R. Bele 55'; Szmidt 58'

Umpires:
Elchin Qurbanov (AZE)
Neil McAlpine (SCO)

== Fifth to eighth place classification ==
Points obtained in the preliminary round are carried over into Pool C.

=== Pool C ===
Pos	Team	Pld	W	D	L	GF	GA	GD	Pts	Relegation
5	Ukraine	3	1	2	0	9	5	+4	5	
6	Scotland	3	1	2	0	8	4	+4	5	
7	Wales (R)	3	1	1	1	6	8	−2	4	EuroHockey Championship III
8	Italy (R)	3	0	1	2	7	13	−6	1	EuroHockey Championship III

Source: EuroHockey
Rules for classification: 1) points; 2) goal difference; 3) goals scored; 4) head-to-head result.
(R) Relegated

10 August 2013
11:00

Wales	0–4	Ukraine
	Report	Polishchuk 18', 21'; Moroz 39'; Serdiuk 53'

Umpires:
Pietro Galligani (ITA)
Florian Hösch (AUT)

10 August 2013
13:00

Scotland	5–1	Italy
A. Forsyth 2', 65'; Byers 19', 45'; Bain 64'	Report	Murgia 11'

Umpires:
Will Drury (WAL)
Maksim Perepelitzka (UKR)

11 August 2013
10:00

Wales	5–3	Italy
	Report

Umpires:
Neil McAlpine (SCO)
Elchin Qurbanov (AZE)

11 August 2013
12:00

Scotland	2–2	Ukraine
Bain 6'; Marshall 30'	Report	Paziuk 27'; Yarovanko 65'

Umpires:
Florian Hösch (AUT)
Anton Kochin (RUS)

== First to fourth place classification ==
=== Bracket ===
Semi-finals
10 August
France	5
Austria	3
10 August
Russia	6
Azerbaijan	1

Final
11 August
France	0 (4)
Russia (p.s.o.)	0 (5)
Third place
11 August
Austria	6
Azerbaijan	1

=== Semi-finals ===
10 August 2013
15:00

Russia	6–1	Azerbaijan
Plesetskii 19', 30'; Maiorov 24'; Kornilov 47'; Komarov; Azarov 64'	Report	Tofeeg 44'

Umpires:
Hichem Azaiez (FRA)
Coen van Bunge (NED)

10 August 2013
17:30

France	5–3	Austria
H. Genestet 31'; M. Genestet 33'; Baumgarten 52'; Samson 67'; Martin-Brisac 70'	Report	Schmidt 1'; Körper 11', 57'

Umpires:
Moritz Meissner (GER)
Neil McAlpine (SCO)

=== Third and fourth place ===
11 August 2013
14:30

Austria	6–1	Azerbaijan
Podpera 8'; Körper 15', 55'; B. Stanzl 37'; Fröhlich 54'; A. Bele 64'	Report	53'

Umpires:
Maksim Perepelitzka (UKR)
Moritz Meissner (GER)

=== Final ===
11 August 2013
17:00

France	0–0	Russia
	Report
Penalties
	4–5

Umpires:
Coen van Bunge (NED)
Will Drury (WAL)

== Final standings ==
Pos	Team	Qualification or relegation
1	Russia	Qualification for the 2015 EuroHockey Championship
2	France	Qualification for the 2015 EuroHockey Championship
3	Austria (H)	
4	Azerbaijan	
5	Ukraine	
6	Scotland	
7	Wales (R)	Relegation to the EuroHockey Championship III
8	Italy (R)	Relegation to the EuroHockey Championship III

Source: EHF
(H) Host; (R) Relegated

== See also ==
- 2013 Men's EuroHockey Championship III
- 2013 Men's EuroHockey Championship
- 2013 Women's EuroHockey Championship II
