= 2014–15 Men's FIH Hockey World League Round 1 =

Field hockey tournament

The 2014–15 Men's FIH Hockey World League Round 1 was held from June to December 2014. A total of 35 teams competing in 7 events were part in this round of the tournament playing for 15 berths in the Round 2, played from January to March 2015.

== Qualification ==
Each national association member of the International Hockey Federation (FIH) had the opportunity to compete in the tournament. Teams ranked 20th and lower in the FIH World Rankings current at the time of seeking entries for the competition were allocated to one of the Round 1 events. The following 35 teams, shown with final pre-tournament rankings, competed in this round of the tournament.

- Austria (22)
- Azerbaijan (38)
- Bangladesh (40)
- Barbados (47)
- Belarus (31)
- Brazil (33)
- Bulgaria (54)
- Chile (25)
- Croatia (48)
- Czech Republic (21)
- Dominican Republic (56)
- Egypt (24)
- Fiji (70)
- Ghana (37)
- Guatemala
- Hong Kong (42)
- Iran
- Italy (28)
- Jamaica (67)
- Kenya (45)
- Lithuania
- Mexico (30)
- Oman (36)
- Papua New Guinea (72)
- Portugal (50)
- Russia (20)
- Samoa (71)
- Slovakia (51)
- Sri Lanka (46)
- Switzerland (41)
- Tanzania
- Thailand (59)
- Trinidad and Tobago (34)
- Turkey (55)
- Ukraine (27)

== Sveti Ivan Zelina ==
- Sveti Ivan Zelina, Croatia, 1–6 July 2014.

=== Pool ===
All times are Central European Summer Time (UTC+02:00)

Team	Pld	W	WD	LD	L	GF	GA	GD	Pts
Russia	4	4	0	0	0	38	0	+38	12
Switzerland	4	2	1	0	1	20	10	+10	8
Bulgaria	4	2	0	0	2	4	22	−18	6
Croatia	4	1	0	1	2	8	14	−6	4
Turkey	4	0	0	0	4	2	26	−24	0

Advanced to Round 2

1 July 2014
16:15

Switzerland	11–0	Bulgaria
Kloter 4', 9', 52'; Wyss-Chodat 20'; Steffen 27'; Wullschleger 32'; Hödle 35', 66'; Michel 47'; Keller 58'; Morard 68'	Report

Umpires:
Maksym Perepelytsya (UKR)
Mustafa Ozdal (TUR)

1 July 2014
18:30

Croatia	6–1	Turkey
Mučič 16'; Premilovać 35'; Cvetko 37', 53'; Hanžek 56'; Taušan 64'	Report	Kilinc 59'

Umpires:
Chahir Panschiri (SUI)
Oliver Tarnoczi (AUT)

2 July 2014
16:15

Russia	11–0	Bulgaria
Yankun 4', 33'; Azarov 18', 22', 33'; Zamalutdinov 25', 54'; Palyanitsa 31'; Plesetskiy 34'; Mayorov 39'; Komarov 50'	Report

Umpires:
Maksym Perepelytsya (UKR)
Tin Matković (CRO)

2 July 2014
18:30

Switzerland	7–1	Turkey
Müller 23'; Hödle 30'; Wullschleger 38'; Greder 43'; Steffen 48'; Michel 51'; Keller 54'	Report	Erman 34'

Umpires:
Dimitry Zhabin (RUS)
Hristiyan Vasilev (BUL)

3 July 2014
16:15

Switzerland	0–7	Russia
	Report	Azarov 5'; Palyanitsa 9', 50', 59'; Yankun 20', 46'; Zamalutdinov 68'

Umpires:
Oliver Tarnoczi (AUT)
Mustafa Ozdal (TUR)

3 July 2014
18:30

Bulgaria	1–0	Croatia
Kutovski 61'	Report

Umpires:
Dimitry Zhabin (RUS)
Chahir Panschiri (SUI)

5 July 2014
16:15

Russia	10–0	Turkey
Azarov 2', 22', 49', 64'; Yankun 6', 32'; Palyanitsa 43'; Zamalutdinov 57'; Komarov 59'; Kornilov 65'	Report

Umpires:
Hristiyan Vasilev (BUL)
Chahir Panschiri (SUI)

5 July 2014
18:30

Croatia	2–2	Switzerland
Hanžek 26'; Taušan 39'	Report	Kloter 48'; Steffen 51'
Penalties
Hršak (penalty shoot-out scored); Cefko (penalty shoot-out missed); Vuk (penalty shoot-out scored); Brisevač (penalty shoot-out missed); Cvetko (penalty shoot-out scored)	3–4	(penalty shoot-out scored) Müller; (penalty shoot-out scored) Steimer; (penalty shoot-out missed) Keller; (penalty shoot-out scored) Richner; (penalty shoot-out scored) Wullschleger

Umpires:
Maksym Perepelytsya (UKR)
Mustafa Ozdal (TUR)

6 July 2014
16:15

Turkey	0–3	Bulgaria
	Report	Todorov 15'; Stoyanov 56'; Idriz 61'

Umpires:
Dimitry Zhabin (RUS)
Oliver Tarnoczi (AUT)

6 July 2014
18:30

Croatia	0–10	Russia
	Report	Plesetskiy 1', 26'; Azarov 8', 14', 33', 43'; Yankun 13', 63', 65'; Kornilov 55'

Umpires:
Maksym Perepelytsya (UKR)
Hristiyan Vasilev (BUL)

=== Awards ===
- Top Goalscorer - (Russia) Dmitry Azarov

== Hradec Králové ==
- Hradec Králové, Czech Republic, 2–7 September 2014.

=== Pool ===
All times are Central European Summer Time (UTC+02:00)

Team	Pld	W	WD	LD	L	GF	GA	GD	Pts
Belarus	4	3	1	0	0	14	5	+9	11
Czech Republic	4	3	0	0	1	21	6	+15	9
Ukraine	4	2	0	1	1	23	7	+16	7
Slovakia	4	1	0	0	3	8	20	−12	3
Lithuania	4	0	0	0	4	3	31	−28	0

Advanced to Round 2

2 September 2014
15:30

Ukraine	10–2	Lithuania
Paziuk 9', 34', 61', 68'; Koshelenko 16', 55'; Luppa 23'; Polishchuk 39'; Popovchenko 41'; Moroz 70'	Report	Balsiukas 18'; Gridziuška 62'

Umpires:
Ben Göntgen (GER)
Tomáš Holek (CZE)

2 September 2014
17:45

Belarus	5–2	Slovakia
Mikheichyk 16', 23'; Radziviovich 20'; Satsiuk 24'; Lutsevich 47'	Report	Parajka 44'; Čerňanský 63'

Umpires:
Maksym Perpelytsya (UKR)
Jaroslav Suchocki (LTU)

3 September 2014
15:30

Ukraine	10–0	Slovakia
Polishchuk 4', 40'; Buriatynskyi 21'; Kalinchuk 29', 68'; Luppa 33'; Paziuk 49', 58'; Mirzoian 66'; Yasinskyi 69'	Report

Umpires:
Ben Göntgen (GER)
Eduard Hordzich (BLR)

3 September 2014
17:45

Czech Republic	11–0	Lithuania
Vacek 12', 36', 43'; Procházka 19', 32', 33', 48'; Kindl 24'; Piterák 56'; Hyncik 59'; Mirzoian 66'; Yasinskyi 69'	Report

Umpires:
Maksym Perpelytsya (UKR)
Michal Margolien (SVK)

4 September 2014
15:30

Slovakia	5–1	Lithuania
Jelačič 29'; Petrakovic 31'; Michalovic 53'; Čerňanský 58', FG'	Report	Pabijanskas 26'

Umpires:
Tomáš Holek (CZE)
Eduard Hordzich (BLR)

4 September 2014
17:45

Belarus	3–2	Czech Republic
Satsiuk 12'; Lutsevich 19', 38'	Report	Procházka 6'; Capouch 48'

Umpires:
Jaroslav Suchocki (LTU)
Michal Margolien (SVK)

6 September 2014
10:45

Lithuania	0–5	Belarus
	Report	Satsiuk 8', 31'; Kisialevich 9'; Hancharou 25', 56'

Umpires:
Maksym Perpelytsya (UKR)
Tomáš Holek (CZE)

6 September 2014
13:00

Ukraine	2–4	Czech Republic
Paziuk 6'; Koshelenko 37'	Report	Kindl 4', 54', 60'; Babický 41'

Umpires:
Ben Göntgen (GER)
Michal Margolien (SVK)

7 September 2014
10:45

Belarus	1–1	Ukraine
Zyshchyk 23'	Report	Paziuk 6'
Penalties
Hancharou (penalty shoot-out missed); Kisialevich (penalty shoot-out scored); Zyshchyk (penalty shoot-out scored); Kachmarski (penalty shoot-out scored)	3–1	(penalty shoot-out missed) Moroz; (penalty shoot-out missed) Koshelenko; (penalty shoot-out scored) Luppa; (penalty shoot-out missed) Polishchuk

Umpires:
Ben Göntgen (GER)
Jaroslav Suchocki (LTU)

7 September 2014
15:15

Czech Republic	4–1	Slovakia
Plochý 25', 43'; Vacek 28'; Procházka 41'	Report	Petráš 67'

Umpires:
Maksym Perpelytsya (UKR)
Eduard Hordzich (BLR)

== Dhaka ==
- Dhaka, Bangladesh, 5–7 September 2014.

=== Pool ===
All times are Bangladesh Standard Time (UTC+06:00)

Team	Pld	W	D	L	GF	GA	GD	Pts
Bangladesh	2	2	0	0	6	3	+3	6
Sri Lanka	2	1	0	1	8	4	+4	3
Hong Kong	2	0	0	2	2	9	−7	0

Advanced to Round 2

5 September 2014
15:30

Sri Lanka	2–3	Bangladesh
Priyalanka 13', 66'	Report	Jubair 4'; Das 22'; Rahman 27'

Umpires:
Nazmi Kamarudin (MAS)
Khalid Hussain (HKG)

6 September 2014
15:30

Hong Kong	1–6	Sri Lanka
Iu F. 47'	Report	Ranasingha 13', 45'; Dissanayaka 30'; Priyalanka 43'; Nanayakkara 48'; Mulafar 52'

Umpires:
Nazmi Kamarudin (MAS)
Salim Reza (BAN)

7 September 2014
15:30

Bangladesh	3–1	Hong Kong
Jubair 27', 45', 54'	Report	Chan K.H. 51'

Umpires:
Nazmi Kamarudin (MAS)
Roshan Hemantha (SRI)

== Muscat ==
- Muscat, Oman, 5–7 September 2014.

=== Pool ===
All times are Gulf Standard Time (UTC+04:00)

Team	Pld	W	WD	LD	L	GF	GA	GD	Pts
Azerbaijan	3	2	0	1	0	17	4	+13	7
Oman	3	2	0	0	1	10	2	+8	6
Iran	3	1	1	0	1	10	4	+6	5
Thailand	3	0	0	0	3	0	27	−27	0

Advanced to Round 2

5 September 2014
18:00

Azerbaijan	3–3	Iran
Ghazanfar 31', 38'; Khalid 39'	Report	Taherirad 21'; Norouzzadeh 63', 66'
Penalties
Tofeeg (penalty shoot-out missed); Khalid (penalty shoot-out missed); Ali (penalty shoot-out missed)	0–3	(penalty shoot-out scored) Taherirad; (penalty shoot-out scored) Bahrami; (penalty shoot-out scored) Norouzzadeh

Umpires:
Sherif Elamari (EGY)
Suwith Yooyuen (THA)

5 September 2014
20:30

Oman	8–0	Thailand
Al-Nofli 12', 38'; Rajab 30', 63'; Al-Hasani 34', 47'; Bait 36'; Al-Qasmi 70'	Report

6 September 2014
18:00

Thailand	0–7	Iran
	Report	Taherirad 32', 39'; Bahrami 43', 64', 68'; Bohlooli 52'; Norouzzadeh 67'

Umpires:
Thani Al-Wahaibi (OMA)
Elchin Gurbanov (AZE)

6 September 2014
20:30

Azerbaijan	2–1	Oman
Ghazanfar 59'; Ali 64'	Report	Al-Shatari 45'

Umpires:
Rahmat Mohammadi (IRN)
Suwith Yooyuen (THA)

7 September 2014
18:00

Thailand	0–12	Azerbaijan
	Report	Ghazanfar 10', 15'; Ali 11', 19'; Nasir 21', 66'; Tofeeg 23'; Nadirov 25', 46', 47'; Butt 29', 35'

Umpires:
Thani Al-Wahaibi (OMA)
Rahmat Mohammadi (IRN)

7 September 2014
20:30

Oman	1–0	Iran
Rajab 24'	Report

Umpires:
Sherif Elamari (EGY)
Suwith Yooyuen (THA)

== Nairobi ==
- Nairobi, Kenya, 5–7 September 2014.

=== Pool ===
All times are East Africa Time (UTC+03:00)

Team	Pld	W	WD	LD	L	GF	GA	GD	Pts
Egypt	3	3	0	0	0	22	3	+19	9
Kenya	3	1	1	0	1	10	3	+7	5
Ghana	3	1	0	1	1	16	4	+12	4
Tanzania	3	0	0	0	3	0	38	−38	0

Advanced to Round 2

5 September 2014
16:30

Egypt	3–2	Ghana
Hassan 15', 66'; Elnaggar 44'	Report	Sam 2'; Akaba 25'

Umpires:
Sean Rapaport (RSA)
Tony Fernandes (KEN)

5 September 2014
19:00

Kenya	8–0	Tanzania
Musasia 16', 20'; Simiyu 33'; Magomere 38'; Wanangwe 44'; Wakhungu 47'; Luvanda 51'; Esikuri 59'	Report

Umpires:
Alfred Akfrong (GHA)
Saleem Hisam (EGY)

6 September 2014
16:30

Egypt	17–0	Tanzania
Khalil 3', 35', 51', 67'; Said 5', 14'; Hassan 19'; Nasr 20', 52', 58'; Basha 24', 33', 47'; Elnaggar 33'; Ibrahim 39'; Ramadan 54'; Atef 62'	Report

Umpires:
Tony Fernandes (KEN)
Alfred Akfrong (GHA)

6 September 2014
19:00

Ghana	1–1 2-4 shoot outs	Kenya
Botsio 43'	Report	Wanangwe 29'

7 September 2014
13:30

Ghana	13–0	Tanzania
Frimpong 3', 25', 61'; Botsio 8', 12', 16'; Ntiamoah 11'; Moses 18'; Damalie 36'; Asiedu 54', 58'; Akuamoah 62', 65'	Report

Umpires:
Tony Fernandes (KEN)
Saleem Hisam (EGY)

7 September 2014
16:00

Kenya	1–2	Egypt
Saina 56'	Report	Sayed 32', 43'

Umpires:
Sean Rapaport (RSA)
Alfred Akfrong (GHA)

== Guadalajara ==
- Guadalajara, Mexico, 12–14 September 2014.

=== Pool ===
All times are Central Daylight Time (UTC−06:00)

Team	Pld	W	WD	LD	L	GF	GA	GD	Pts
Chile	3	3	0	0	0	26	2	+24	9
Mexico	3	1	1	0	1	16	4	+12	5
Brazil	3	1	0	1	1	10	4	+6	4
Guatemala	3	0	0	0	3	1	43	−42	0

Advanced to Round 2

12 September 2014
14:00

Brazil	9–0	Guatemala
Vehrle-Smith 7', 24', 44', 50'; Borges 16', 68'; Souza 18' de Paula 30'; Van der Heijden 33'	Report

Umpires:
Jonathan Altamrano (MEX)
Matias Barbosa (CHI)

12 September 2014
16:15

Chile	3–1	Mexico
Martín 22'; N. Renz 29', 43'	Report	Estrada 27'

Umpires:
Devin Hooper (GUY)
Oliver Höck (BRA)

13 September 2014
14:00

Brazil	1–4	Chile
Borges 64'	Report	N. Renz 14', 34'; Rodríguez 39'; Binder 51'

Umpires:
Devin Hooper (GUY)
Luis Cardona (GUA)

13 September 2014
16:15

Mexico	15–1	Guatemala
Moreno 2', 52'; García 5'; Aguilar 19', 24', 30', 39', 48', 69', 70'; Estrada 46'; Pedraza 50'; Borquez 62', 67'; Peraza 64'	Report	Leiva 7'

Umpires:
Matias Barbosa (CHI)
Oliver Höck (BRA)

14 September 2014
14:00

Chile	19–0	Guatemala
Valenzuela 5'; Binder 13'; Martín 16', 34', 47', 52', 61'; Eggers 20', 54', 65', 70'; Rodríguez 21', 39'; Zarhi 24', 49'; Silva 31'; Kapsch 48'; Contardo 50'; Achondo 64'	Report

Umpires:
Oliver Höck (BRA)
Jonathan Altamrano (MEX)

14 September 2014
16:15

Mexico	0–0	Brazil
	Report
Penalties
Aguilar (penalty shoot-out scored); Pedraza (penalty shoot-out scored); Borquez (penalty shoot-out scored)	3–0	(penalty shoot-out missed) Rost; (penalty shoot-out missed) Vehrle-Smith; (penalty shoot-out missed) de Paula

Umpires:
Devin Hooper (GUY)
Matias Barbosa (CHI)

== Lousada ==
- Lousada, Portugal, 12–14 September 2014.

=== Pool ===
All times are Western European Summer Time (UTC+01:00)

Team	Pld	W	WD	WL	L	GF	GA	GD	Pts
Austria	2	1	1	0	0	7	2	+5	5
Italy	2	1	0	0	1	6	8	−2	3
Portugal	2	0	0	1	1	3	6	−3	1

Advanced to Round 2

12 September 2014
18:30

Austria	1–1	Portugal
Bele 25'	Report	Franco 43'
Penalties
Stanzl (penalty shoot-out scored); Rudofsky (penalty shoot-out scored); Eitenberger (penalty shoot-out scored)	3–0	(penalty shoot-out missed) Teixeira; (penalty shoot-out missed) Tavares; (penalty shoot-out missed) Santos

Umpires:
Andres Ortíz (ESP)
Vincenzo Ilgrande (ITA)

13 September 2014
17:30

Italy	1–6	Austria
Manes 64'	Report	Stanzl 13'; Körper 20', 53', 70'; Hasun 21'; Rudofsky 65'

Umpires:
Andres Ortíz (ESP)
Pedro Santos (POR)

14 September 2014
17:30

Portugal	2–5	Italy
Santos 57', 62'	Report	Corsi 27' de Vivo 45'; Cioli 46'; Keenan 60'; Gonzalez 65'

Umpires:
Andres Ortíz (ESP)
Roland Langer (AUT)

== Kingston ==
- Kingston, Jamaica, 1–5 October 2014.

=== Pool ===
All times are Eastern Standard Time (UTC−05:00)

Team	Pld	W	WD	WL	L	GF	GA	GD	Pts
Trinidad and Tobago	3	2	1	0	0	8	3	+5	8
Jamaica	3	1	1	0	1	4	6	−2	5
Dominican Republic	3	0	0	3	0	5	5	0	3
Barbados	3	0	1	0	2	3	6	−3	2

Advanced to Round 2

1 October 2014
16:30

Barbados	1–2	Jamaica
Franklyn 9'	Report	Davis 22'; McGlashen 28'

Umpires:
Nku Davis (TRI)
Arturo Vázquez (MEX)

2 October 2014
09:00

Trinidad and Tobago	2–2	Dominican Republic
Murray 2'; Toussaint 48'	Report	Moncion 35'; López 59'
Penalties
Cowie (penalty shoot-out missed); Toussaint (penalty shoot-out scored); Marcano (penalty shoot-out scored)	2–0	(penalty shoot-out missed) Moncion; (penalty shoot-out missed) López; (penalty shoot-out missed) Cabrera; (penalty shoot-out missed) Soler

Umpires:
Duvaughn Henlon (JAM)
Shane Lewis (BAR)

4 October 2014
11:30

Barbados	1–3	Trinidad and Tobago
Warner 65'	Report	Daniel 18'; Toussaint 46'; Murray 48'

Umpires:
Duvaughn Henlon (JAM)
Arturo Vázquez (MEX)

4 October 2014
16:30

Dominican Republic	2–2	Jamaica
Moncion 8'; López 61'	Report	Gardener 31'; Beach 50'
Penalties
López (penalty shoot-out missed); Moncion (penalty shoot-out missed); Nivar (penalty shoot-out missed); García (penalty shoot-out missed)	0–2	(penalty shoot-out missed) Mitchell; (penalty shoot-out scored) McGlashen; (penalty shoot-out scored) Beach; (penalty shoot-out missed) Kerr

Umpires:
Nku Davis (TRI)
Shane Lewis (BAR)

5 October 2014
11:30

Dominican Republic	1–1	Barbados
López 47'	Report	Rudder 57'
Penalties
Sepulveda (penalty shoot-out scored); Moncion (penalty shoot-out missed); Soler (penalty shoot-out scored); Cabrera (penalty shoot-out missed)	2–4	(penalty shoot-out scored) Rudder; (penalty shoot-out scored) Holder; (penalty shoot-out scored) Warner; (penalty shoot-out scored) Wharton

Umpires:
Nku Davis (TRI)
Duvaughn Henlon (JAM)

5 October 2014
19:00

Trinidad and Tobago	3–0	Jamaica
Toussaint 45', 67'; Marcano 60'	Report

Umpires:
Shane Lewis (BAR)
Arturo Vázquez (MEX)

== Suva ==
- Suva, Fiji, 6–11 December 2014.

=== Pool ===
All times are Fiji Summer Time (UTC+12:00)

Team	Pld	W	D	L	GF	GA	GD	Pts
Fiji	2	2	0	0	21	3	+18	6
Papua New Guinea	2	1	0	1	6	9	−3	3
Samoa	2	0	0	2	2	17	−15	0

Advanced to Round 2

6 December 2014
14:30

Fiji	13–1	Samoa
Wedlock 2'; Dutta 2'; King 8'; D. Mock 9'; C. Mock 15', 68'; Edwards 29', 69'; Al. Smith 35', 41'; Corrie 46'; Ad. Smith 62', 66'	Report	Nokise 60'

Umpires:
Tim Bond (NZL)
Simon Thresher (AUS)

7 December 2014
18:30

Samoa	1–4	Papua New Guinea
Sa 40'	Report	Pomat 3'; Kanamon 49'; Lowah 61', 64'

Umpires:
Harry Heritage (FIJ)
Epeli Tukuca (FIJ)

11 December 2014
16:30

Fiji	8–2	Papua New Guinea
H. Smith 1', 48'; Mock 25', 66'; Dutta 32'; Saqacala 46'; Corrie 68'; A. Smith 70'	Report	Kanamon 64'; Samen 68'

Umpires:
Tim Bond (NZL)
Simon Thresher (AUS)
