= 2015 Men's EuroHockey Championship III =

Field hockey tournament

Tournament details
- Host country: Portugal
- City: Lisbon
- Dates: 19–25 July
- Teams: 6 (from 1 confederation)
- Venue: Estrada Biscoiteiras

Final positions
- Champions: Wales (1st title)
- Runner-up: Portugal
- Third place: Italy

Tournament statistics
- Matches played: 11
- Goals scored: 88 (8 per match)
- Top scorer(s): (Portugal) David Franco (Wales) Gareth Furlong (Belarus) Ivan Kisialevich (5 goals)

The 2015 Men's EuroHockey Championship III was the sixth edition of the Men's EuroHockey Championship III, the third level of the European field hockey championships organized by the European Hockey Federation.

It was held from 19 until 25 July 2015 in Lisbon, Portugal. The winner and runner-up of this tournament were promoted to the 2017 EuroHockey Championship II.

== Qualified teams ==
Dates	Event	Location	Quotas	Qualifiers
3–11 August 2013	2013 EuroHockey Championship II	Vienna, Austria	2	Wales; Italy
12–18 August 2013	2013 EuroHockey Championship III	Lausanne, Switzerland	4	Belarus; ~~Gibraltar~~; Portugal; Sweden; Turkey
21–26 July	2013 EuroHockey Championship IV	Athens, Greece	0	~~Greece~~
Total			6	

== Format ==
The six teams were split into two groups of three teams. The top two teams advanced to the semi-finals to determine the winner in a knockout system. The bottom two teams played against each other to determine the 5th and 6th place teams.

== Results ==
All times are local (UTC+2).

=== Preliminary round ===
==== Pool A ====
Pos	Team	Pld	W	D	L	GF	GA	GD	Pts	Qualification
1	Wales	2	2	0	0	20	1	+19	6	Semi-finals
2	Portugal (H)	2	1	0	1	11	5	+6	3	Semi-finals
3	Sweden	2	0	0	2	1	26	−25	0	Fifth place game

Source: FIH
Rules for classification: 1) points; 2) goal difference; 3) goals scored; 4) head-to-head result.
(H) Hosts

19 July 2015
18:45

Wales	4–1	Portugal
Kelly 15'; Carson 34'; Shipperley 47'; Francis 66'	Report	Franco 59'

Umpires:
Johannes Berneth (GER)
Nicklas Stenberg (SWE)

21 July 2015
16:30

Sweden	0–16	Wales
	Report	Furlong 6', 11', 16'; Gowman 9', 30', 56'; Naughalty 18', 48', 70+'; Carson 19', 37', 49'; Brignull 45'; Francis 47'; Hutchinson 52'; Kyriakides 65'

Umpires:
Pietro Gallaigani (ITA)
Andrei Kliatskov (BLR)

22 July 2015
18:45

Portugal	10–1	Sweden
Moreira 6'; Pereira 18'; Franco 32', 43', 46', 66'; Silva 48'; Rodrigues 51'; Santos 53'; Ribeiro 56'	Report	Hellstrand 60'

Umpires:
Pietro Galligani (ITA)
Yucel Erdogan (TUR)

==== Pool B ====
Pos	Team	Pld	W	D	L	GF	GA	GD	Pts	Qualification
1	Italy	2	2	0	0	9	3	+6	6	Semi-finals
2	Belarus	2	1	0	1	14	5	+9	3	Semi-finals
3	Turkey	2	0	0	2	1	16	−15	0	Fifth place game

Source: FIH
Rules for classification: 1) points; 2) goal difference; 3) goals scored; 4) head-to-head result.

19 July 2015
16:30

Italy	5–0	Turkey
Nunez 29'; Julian Montone 45'; Carta 60'; Dussi 65'; Malta 68'	Report

Umpires:
Luis Martinez (ESP)
Kevin Roberts (WAL)

21 July 2015
18:45

Belarus	3–4	Italy
Radzivinovich 8'; Hancharou 36', 62'	Report	Keenan 24', 29'; Cioli 52'; Malta 58'

Umpires:
Pedro Santos (POR)
Yucel Erdogan (TUR)

22 July 2015
16:30

Turkey	1–11	Belarus
Coklu 56'	Report	Kisialevich 10', 17', 44', 51'; Mikheichyk 20', 27', 56'; Hancharou 24'; Satsiuk 34'; Radzivinovich 41'; Lutsevich 55'

Umpires:
Nicklas Stenberg (SWE)
Kevin Roberts (WAL)

=== Fifth to sixth place classification ===
24 July 2015
14:00

Sweden	2–8	Turkey
Eliasson 27'; Wilander 66'	Report	Özkiliç 17', 52'; Acikgoz 40'; Özul 42', 59'; Kilinc 50'; Guden 69'; Demirel 70+'

Umpires:
Pedro Santos (POR)
Kevin ROberts (WAL)

=== First to fourth place classification ===
Semi-finals
24 July
Italy	1 (0)
Portugal (p.s.o)	1 (2)
24 July
Wales	5
Belarus	1

Final
25 July
Portugal	0
Wales	4
Third place
25 July
Italy	7
Belarus	3

==== Semi-finals ====
24 July 2015
16:15

Italy	1–1	Portugal
Julian Montone 51'	Report	Silva 15'
Penalties
Andrea (penalty shoot-out missed); Nunez (penalty shoot-out missed); Manes (penalty shoot-out missed); Dussi (penalty shoot-out missed)	0–2	(penalty shoot-out missed) Silva; (penalty shoot-out scored) Tavares; (penalty shoot-out scored) Santos

Umpires:
Johannes Berneth (GER)
Andrei Kliatskov (BLR)

24 July 2015
18:45

Wales	5–1	Belarus
Kyriakides 4'; Hawker 26', 70'; Francis 60'; Naughalty 62'	Report	Lutsevich 57'

Umpires:
Pietro Galligani (ITA)
Luis Martinez (ESP)

==== Third place game ====
25 July 2015
16:15

Italy	7–3	Belarus
Corsi 9', 39' de Vivo 30'; Julian Montone 41', 62'; Cioli 45'; Nunez 47'	Report	Hancharou 23'; Radzivinovich 61'; Kisialevich

Umpires:
Johannes Berneth (GER)
Nicklas Stenberg (SWE)

==== Final ====
25 July 2015
18:45

Portugal	0–4	Wales
	Report	Furlong 12', 43'; Hawker 29'; Francis 40'

Umpires:
Luis Martinez (ESP)
Andrei Kliatskov (BLR)

== Final standings ==
Rank	Team
Gold medal	Wales
Silver medal	Portugal
Bronze medal	Italy
4	Belarus
5	Turkey
6	Sweden

Promoted to the EuroHockey Championship II

== See also ==
- 2015 Men's EuroHockey Championship II
- 2015 Men's EuroHockey Championship IV
- 2015 Women's EuroHockey Championship III
