= Azerbaijan national field hockey team =

Azerbaijan national field hockey team may refer to:

- Azerbaijan men's national field hockey team
- Azerbaijan women's national field hockey team
