= 2027 Men's EuroHockey Championship Qualifiers =

Field hockey tournament qualification

Tournament details
- Host countries: Italy; Finland
- Dates: 9–12 July 2026
- Teams: 15 (from 1 confederation)
- Venue: 2 (in 2 host cities)

The 2027 Men's EuroHockey Championship Qualifiers was a series of two qualification events for the 2027 Men's EuroHockey Championship in London, England and the 2027 Men's EuroHockey Championship II. Qualifier I was held in Italy and Qualifier II in Finland.

The winners Scotland and the runners-up Italy from Qualifier I qualified for the 2027 EuroHockey Championship in London and the remaining six sides will play in the EuroHockey Championship II. The winners Lithuania and the runners-up Gibraltar from Qualifier II qualified for the 2027 EuroHockey Chamionship II.

== Qualification ==
All teams not already qualified directly for the 2027 Men's EuroHockey Championship were eligible to play in the Qualifiers. Teams qualified for the Qualifier I or II based on their performance in the 2025 EuroHockey Championships.

=== Qualifier I ===
The following eight teams qualified for the Qualifier I.

Dates	Event	Location	Quotas	Qualifiers
27 July – 2 August 2025	2025 EuroHockey Championship II	Lousada, Portugal	6	Croatia; Czech Republic; Italy; Portugal; Scotland; Switzerland
28 July – 2 August 2025	2025 EuroHockey Championship III	Kırklareli, Turkey	2	Turkey; Ukraine
Total			8	

=== Qualifier II ===
The following sevens teams qualified for the Qualifier II.

Dates	Event	Location	Quotas	Qualifiers
28 July – 2 August 2025	2025 EuroHockey Championship III	Kırklareli, Turkey	5	~~Bulgaria~~; Finland; Hungary; Lithuania; Luxembourg; Malta
—N/a	New entry	—N/a	2	Gibraltar; Greece
Total			7	

== Qualifier I ==
Men's EuroHockey Championship Qualifier I
Tournament details
- Host country: Italy
- City: Rome
- Dates: 9–12 July
- Teams: 8 (from 1 confederation)

Final positions
- Champions: Scotland
- Runner-up: Italy
- Third place: Croatia

Tournament statistics
- Matches played: 12
- Goals scored: 78 (6.5 per match)
- Top scorer(s): (Croatia) Josip Krleža (Scotland) Jamie Golden (5 goals)
- Best player: (Portugal) David Franco
- Best goalkeeper: (Croatia) Fran Pažur

Qualifier I was held in Rome, Italy from 9 to 12 July 2026.

=== Bracket ===
Quarter-finals
9 July
Switzerland	2
Croatia	3
9 July
Scotland	6
Turkey	1
9 July
Czech Republic	3 (2)
Portugal (p.s.o.)	3 (3)
9 July
Italy	6
Ukraine	2

Semi-finals
10 July
Croatia	4
Scotland	6
10 July
Portugal	2
Italy	5

Final
12 July
Scotland	3
Italy	1
Third place
12 July
Croatia	3
Portugal	2

=== Quarter-finals ===
9 July 2026
10:00

Switzerland	2–3	Croatia
Flück 18'; Conrad 52'	Report	Perković 11'; Krleža 27', 41'

Umpires:
Jesus Medinilla (ESP)
Jamie Telfer (SCO)

9 July 2026
12:15

Scotland	6–1	Turkey
McConnell 15'; J. Golden 25'; C. Golden 29'; Robb 44', 58'; Green 54'	Report	Aydin 38'

Umpires:
Ole Ingwersen (GER)
Daniël Veerman (NED)

9 July 2026
16:15

Czech Republic	3–3	Portugal
Lupač 23'; Plachý 28'; Homolka 43'	Report	Rodrigues 2', 33'; Ventosa 49'
Penalties
Homolka (penalty shoot-out scored); J. Toms (penalty shoot-out scored); Plochý (penalty shoot-out missed); F. Toms (penalty shoot-out missed); Klaban (penalty shoot-out missed)	2–3	(penalty shoot-out missed) Rodrigues; (penalty shoot-out scored) Castro; (penalty shoot-out scored) Gomes; (penalty shoot-out scored) Franco

Umpires:
Rob Argent (IRL)
Tommy Croese (BEL)

9 July 2026
18:30

Italy	6–2	Ukraine
Frascino 5', 45'; Harte 20'; Arosio 28'; Puglisi 55'; Giuliani 56'	Report	Koshelenko 2', 34'

Umpires:
Harry Collinson (ENG)
Benjamin Messerli (SUI)

=== Fifth to eighth place classification ===
Cross-overs
11 July
Turkey	0
Switzerland	7
11 July
Czech Republic	7
Ukraine	2

Fifth place
12 July
Switzerland (p.s.o.)	2 (4)
Czech Republic	2 (3)
Seventh place
12 July
Turkey (p.s.o.)	3 (4)
Ukraine	3 (2)

==== Cross-overs ====
11 July 2026
10:00

Turkey	0–7	Switzerland
	Report	Mohrhauer 7'; Kraxner 25'; Gloor 26'; Grandchamp 41'; Gassner 46'; Flück 48'; Thijs 53'

Umpires:
Tommy Croese (BEL)
Ole Ingwersen (GER)

11 July 2026
12:15

Czech Republic	7–2	Ukraine
Plochý 18', 35', 38', 42'; J. Toms 23'; Homolka 41'; Lalík 56'	Report	Shevchuk 24'; Onofriiuk 32'

Umpires:
Jesus Medinilla (ESP)
Benjamin Messerli (SUI)

==== Seventh and eighth place ====
12 July 2026
09:15

Turkey	3–3	Ukraine
Kalkan 24'; Ekinci 27'; Karakuş 39'	Report	Koshelenko 6'; Riabchuk 38'; Solomianyi 58'
Penalties
Keleş (penalty shoot-out missed); Aydin (penalty shoot-out scored); Ataş (penalty shoot-out scored); Ekinci (penalty shoot-out scored); Elagöz (penalty shoot-out scored)	4–2	(penalty shoot-out missed) Onofriiuk; (penalty shoot-out missed) Solomianyi; (penalty shoot-out scored) Kaplinskyi; (penalty shoot-out scored) Shevchuk

Umpires:
Harry Collinson (ENG)
Daniël Veerman (NED)

==== Fifth and sixth place ====
12 July 2026
11:30

Switzerland	2–2	Czech Republic
Hengartner 8'; Grandchamp 43'	Report	Lupač 28'; F. Toms 42'
Penalties
Grandchamp (penalty shoot-out scored); Flück (penalty shoot-out scored); Fischbach (penalty shoot-out missed); Kraxner (penalty shoot-out scored); Conrad (penalty shoot-out missed); Grandchamp (penalty shoot-out missed); Flück (penalty shoot-out scored)	4–3	(penalty shoot-out scored) Homolka; (penalty shoot-out missed) J. Toms; (penalty shoot-out missed) Šmíd; (penalty shoot-out scored) Klaban; (penalty shoot-out scored) Hes; (penalty shoot-out missed) Homolka; (penalty shoot-out missed) Klaban

Umpires:
Rob Argent (IRL)
Jamie Telfer (SCO)

=== First to fourth place classification ===
==== Semi-finals ====
10 July 2026
16:15

Scotland	6–4	Croatia
J. Golden 3', 41', 46'; Walker 5'; C. Golden 17'; Orr 52'	Report	Bachmann 32', 56'; Bahlen 37'; Mucić 49'

Umpires:
Rob Argent (IRL)
Harry Collinson (ENG)

10 July 2026
18:30

Portugal	2–5	Italy
Castro 46'; Ventosa 51'	Report	Frascino 14'; Giuliani 23'; Brocco 43'; Puglisi 53'; Gencarelli 58'

Umpires:
Jamie Telfer (SCO)
Daniël Veerman (NED)

==== Third and fourth place ====
12 July 2026
13:45

Croatia	3–2	Portugal
Krleža 15+', 39', 47'	Report	Gomes 3'; Rodrigues 48'

Umpires:
Tommy Croese (BEL)
Jesus Medinilla (ESP)

==== Final ====
12 July 2026
16:00

Scotland	3–1	Italy
J. Golden 8'; Walker 33'; C. Golden 34'	Report	Brocco 10'

Umpires:
Ole Ingwersen (GER)
Benjamin Messerli (SUI)

=== Final standings ===
Pos	Team	Qualification
1	Scotland	2027 Men's EuroHockey Championship
2	Italy (H)	2027 Men's EuroHockey Championship
3	Croatia	
4	Portugal	
5	Switzerland	
6	Czech Republic	
7	Turkey	
8	Ukraine	

Source: FIH
(H) Host

=== Goalscorers ===
There were 78 goals scored in 12 matches, for an average of 6.5 goals per match.

5 goals

- (Croatia) Josip Krleža
- (Scotland) Jamie Golden

4 goals

- (Czech Republic) Lukáš Plochý

3 goals

- (Italy) Gianluca Frascino
- (Portugal) Miguel Rodrigues
- (Scotland) Cameron Golden
- (Ukraine) Andrii Koshelenko

2 goals

- (Croatia) Lucas Bachmann
- (Czech Republic) Jakub Homolka
- (Czech Republic) Jonáš Lupač
- (Italy) Davide Giuliani
- (Italy) Claudio Brocco
- (Italy) Joaquin Puglisi
- (Portugal) Tiago Ventosa
- (Scotland) Keir Robb
- (Scotland) Struan Walker
- (Switzerland) Loris Grandchamp
- (Switzerland) Jens Flück

1 goal

- (Croatia) Karlo Perković
- (Croatia) Petar Bahlen
- (Croatia) Mario Mucić
- (Czech Republic) Josef Toms
- (Czech Republic) František Toms
- (Czech Republic) Štêpán Lalík
- (Czech Republic) Martin Plachý
- (Italy) Davide Arosio
- (Italy) Franco Harte
- (Italy) Ladislao Gencarelli
- (Portugal) Rodrigo Castro
- (Portugal) Emil Gomes
- (Scotland) Jamie Green
- (Scotland) Andrew McConnell
- (Scotland) Thomas Orr
- (Switzerland) Mika Conrad
- (Switzerland) Matthias Mohrhauer
- (Switzerland) Lukas Hengartner
- (Switzerland) Léonard Kraxner
- (Switzerland) Valentin Gloor
- (Switzerland) Lorenz Gassner
- (Switzerland) Clemént Thijs
- (Turkey) Mehmet Aydin
- (Turkey) Müslüm Ekinci
- (Turkey) Sait Kalkan
- (Turkey) Ömer Karakuş
- (Ukraine) Serhii Riabchuk
- (Ukraine) Vitalii Shevchuk
- (Ukraine) Maksym Onofriiuk
- (Ukraine) Oleksandr Solomianyi

Source: FIH

== Qualifier II ==
Men's EuroHockey Championship Qualifier II
Tournament details
- Host country: Finland
- City: Helsinki
- Dates: 9–12 July
- Teams: 7 (from 1 confederation)
- Venue: Helsinki Velodrome

Final positions
- Champions: Lithuania
- Runner-up: Gibraltar
- Third place: Luxembourg

Tournament statistics
- Matches played: 12
- Goals scored: 44 (3.67 per match)
- Top scorer(s): (Gibraltar) Craig Bossano-Anes (Malta) Thomas Degiovanni (Lithuania) Povilas Sinkevičius (4 goals)
- Best player: (Malta) Thomas Degiovanni
- Best goalkeeper: (Malta) Marvin Grixti

Qualifier II was held at the Helsinki Velodrome in Helsinki, Finland from 9 to 12 July 2026.

=== Participating teams ===
The following seven teams participated in the EuroHockey Championship Qualifier II.

- Gibraltar
- Lithuania
- Malta
- Hungary
- Finland
- Greece
- Luxembourg

=== Preliminary round ===
==== Pool A ====
Pos	Team	Pld	W	D	L	GF	GA	GD	Pts	Qualification
1	Lithuania	2	2	0	0	6	1	+5	6	Final
2	Luxembourg	2	1	0	1	6	2	+4	3	Third place match
3	Hungary	2	0	0	2	0	9	−9	0	Fifth place match

Source: FIH
Rules for classification: 1) points; 2) matches won; 3) goal difference; 4) goals for; 5) head-to-head result; 6) field goals for.

All times are in (UTC+2)

9 July 2026
14:00

Lithuania	2–1	Luxembourg
Vaikenas 29'; Burkot 54'	Report	Krampe 57'

Umpires:
Alessandro Amore (MLT)
Berry van Bentum (NED)

10 July 2026
14:00

Hungary	0–4	Lithuania
	Report	Sinkevičius 33', 39'; Burkot 56', 58'

Umpires:
Alia Raude (GER)
Sammy Howard (GIB)

11 July 2026
13:45

Luxembourg	5–0	Hungary
Krampe 5', 35'; Verschoren 15+'; Ulitzka 40'; Ensch 45'	Report

Umpires:
Sammy Howard (GIB)
Mia Dewing (ENG)

==== Pool B ====
Pos	Team	Pld	W	D	L	GF	GA	GD	Pts	Qualification
1	Gibraltar	3	2	1	0	7	2	+5	7	Final
2	Malta	3	1	1	1	6	7	−1	4	Third place match
3	Finland (H)	3	1	1	1	5	6	−1	4	Fifth place match
4	Greece	3	0	1	2	4	7	−3	1	

Source: FIH
Rules for classification: 1) points; 2) matches won; 3) goal difference; 4) goals for; 5) head-to-head result; 6) field goals for.
(H) Hosts

All times are in (UTC+2)

9 July 2026
16:15

Malta	3–2	Greece
Degiovanni 40', 57'; Ellul-Turner 59'	Report	Welzel 34', 34'

Umpires:
Duncan Ruzzak (SCO)
Simo Makela (FIN)

9 July 2026
18:30

Finland	0–3	Gibraltar
	Report	Lopez 20'; Hernandez 22'; Dobinson 38'

Umpires:
Balasz Szalay (HUN)
Karolis Donculas (LTU)

10 July 2026
16:15

Gibraltar	2–0	Greece
Rodriguez 11'; Bossano-Anes 11'	Report

Umpires:
Duncan Ruzzak (SCO)
Berry van Bentum (NED)

10 July 2026
18:30

Malta	1–3	Finland
Degiovanni 22'	Report	Rihtilä 43'; Laiho 47'; Määttänen 51'

Umpires:
Anatole Platel (FRA)
Balasz Szalay (HUN)

11 July 2026
16:00

Gibraltar	2–2	Malta
Bossano-Anes 48'; Cox 52'	Report	Degiovanni 22'; Rapinett 29'

Umpires:
Berry van Bentum (NED)
Anatole Platel (FRA)

11 July 2026
18:15

Finland	2–2	Greece
Könönen 45', 59'	Report	Dierckx 25'; Welzel 43'

Umpires:
Sarah Craig (IRL)
Alessandro Amore (MLT)

=== Classification round ===
==== Fifth place match ====
12 July 2026
13:15

Hungary	0–2	Finland
	Report	Rantala 38'; Könönen 47'

Umpires:
Alia Raude (GER)
Alessandro Amore (MLT)

==== Third place match ====
12 July 2026
15:30

Luxembourg	1–1	Malta
Schmit 3'	Report	Agius 24'
Penalties
Verschoren (penalty shoot-out scored); Ensch (penalty shoot-out scored); Bouche (penalty shoot-out missed); Clarinval (penalty shoot-out scored); Masset (penalty shoot-out scored)	4–3	(penalty shoot-out scored) Calleja; (penalty shoot-out scored) Pace Gasan; (penalty shoot-out missed) Degiovanni; (penalty shoot-out missed) Dimech; (penalty shoot-out scored) Fsadni

Umpires:
Berry van Bentum (NED)
Sammy Howard (GIB)

==== Final ====
12 July 2026
17:45

Lithuania	3–3	Gibraltar
Petkevič 7'; Sinkevičius 30', 33'	Report	Bossano-Annes 30+', 32'; Lopez 54'
Penalties
Sinkevičius (penalty shoot-out scored); Ridlauskas (penalty shoot-out missed); Lopato (penalty shoot-out missed); Stankevič (penalty shoot-out scored)	2–1	(penalty shoot-out scored) Cox; (penalty shoot-out missed) Duo; (penalty shoot-out missed) Bossano-Anes; (penalty shoot-out missed) Caetano; (penalty shoot-out missed) Lopez

Umpires:
Sarah Craig (IRL)
Duncan Ruzzak (SCO)

=== Final standings ===
Pos	Team	Qualification
1	Lithuania	2027 EuroHockey Championship II
2	Gibraltar	2027 EuroHockey Championship II
3	Luxembourg	
4	Malta	
5	Finland (H)	
6	Hungary	
7	Greece	

Source: FIH
(H) Host

=== Goalscorers ===
There were 44 goals scored in 12 matches, for an average of 3.67 goals per match.

4 goals

- (Gibraltar) Craig Bossano-Anes
- (Malta) Thomas Degiovanni
- (Lithuania) Povilas Sinkevičius

3 goals

- (Finland) Emil Könönen
- (Greece) Paris Welzel
- (Lithuania) Andžej Burkot
- (Luxembourg) Leopold Krampe

2 goals

- (Gibraltar) Julian Lopez

1 goal

- (Finland) Ari Laiho
- (Finland) Elmeri Rihtilä
- (Finland) Tommi Rantala
- (Finland) Santeri Määttänen
- (Gibraltar) Jack Cox
- (Gibraltar) Ian Rodriguez
- (Gibraltar) Julian Hernandez
- (Gibraltar) Leigh Dobinson
- (Greece) Nikolas Dierckx
- (Lithuania) Dominykas Vaikenas
- (Lithuania) Danielius Petkevič
- (Luxembourg) Henry Ensch
- (Luxembourg) Frederic Schmit
- (Luxembourg) Leander Ulitzka
- (Luxembourg) Lohan Verschoren
- (Malta) Christ Agius
- (Malta) Joseph Ellul-Turner
- (Malta) Redeemer Rapinett

Source: FIH

== See also ==
- 2026 Women's EuroHockey Championship Qualifier I
- 2026 Women's EuroHockey Championship Qualifier II
