= 2013 Men's EuroHockey Championship IV =

Field hockey tournament

Tournament details
- Host country: Greece
- City: Athens
- Dates: 21 July – 26 July
- Teams: 3 (from 1 confederation)

Final positions
- Champions: Greece (1st title)
- Runner-up: Bulgaria
- Third place: Cyprus

Tournament statistics
- Matches played: 6
- Goals scored: 26 (4.33 per match)
- Top scorer: (Bulgaria) Milush Stoyanov (3 goals)

The 2013 Men's EuroHockey Nations Championship IV was the fifth edition of the EuroHockey Championship IV, the fourth level of the men's European field hockey championships organized by the European Hockey Federation. It was held in Athens, Greece from 21 to 26 July 2013.

Greece promoted to the 2015 EuroHockey Nations Championship III by finishing top in this round-robin tournament.

== Results ==
=== Standings ===
Pos	Team	Pld	W	D	L	GF	GA	GD	Pts	Promotion
1	Greece (H)	4	3	1	0	11	6	+5	10	EuroHockey Championship III
2	Bulgaria	4	2	0	2	9	7	+2	6	
3	Cyprus	4	0	1	3	6	13	−7	1	

Source: TheSports.org
(H) Hosts

=== Matches ===
21 July 2013
19:00

Bulgaria	1–2	Greece
M. Stoyanov 51'	Report	Artinos 47'; Goultidis 62'

Umpires:
Christos Georghiades (CYP)
Jakub Mejzlik (CZE)

22 July 2013
19:00

Greece	4–4	Cyprus
Goultidis 10'; Kagiorgis 24'; Fouflias 41'; Pitarokoilis 65'	Report	Rfthymiou 31'; E. Lazarides 37'; Loizou 44'; Michael 59'

Umpires:
Hristiyan Vasilev (BUL)
Robert Johnston (IRL)

23 July 2013
19:00

Cyprus	1–3	Bulgaria
Makris 63'	Report	Kutovski 4'; M. Stoyanov 21'; R. Grozkov 66'

Umpires:
Giorgios Makris (GRE)
Jakub Mejzlik (CZE)

24 July 2013
19:00

Bulgaria	1–3	Greece
R. Grozkov 69'	Report	Sarris 14'; Pitarokoilis 47'; V. Fouflias 68'

Umpires:
Christos Georghiades (CYP)
Robert Johnston (IRL)

25 July 2013
19:00

Cyprus	1–4	Bulgaria
Tilemachou 19'	Report	Pavlov 11', 61'; M. Stoyanov 16'

Umpires:
Giorgos Makris (GRE)
Jakub Mejzlik (CZE)

26 July 2013
19:00

Greece	2–0	Cyprus
Fragkos 33'; Sideridis 41'	Report

Umpires:
Hristiyan Vasilev (BUL)
Robert Johnston (IRL)

== See also ==
- 2013 Men's EuroHockey Championship III
