= 2025 Men's EuroHockey Championship III =

Tournament details
- Host country: Turkey
- City: Kırklareli
- Dates: 28 July – 2 August
- Teams: 8 (from 1 confederation)

Final positions
- Champions: Ukraine (3rd title)
- Runner-up: Turkey
- Third place: Lithuania

Tournament statistics
- Matches played: 20
- Goals scored: 131 (6.55 per match)
- Top scorer: (Ukraine) Andrii Koshelenko (10 goals)
- Best player: (Ukraine) Dmytro Luppa
- Best goalkeeper: (Ukraine) Bohdan Tovstolytkin

The 2025 Men's EuroHockey Championship III was the 11th edition of the Men's EuroHockey Championship III, the third level of the men's European field hockey championships organized by the European Hockey Federation.

It was held in Kırklareli, Turkey from 28 July to 2 August 2025. It was the first time Turkey hosted a Men's EuroHockey Championship event. Ukraine won a record-extending third Championship III title by defeating the hosts Turkey 9–5 in the final. Lithuania won the bronze medal as they defeated Bulgaria 3–1.

== Qualification ==
The eight teams qualified based on their performance in the 2025 Men's EuroHockey Championship Qualifiers, with the teams finishing sixth and lower qualifying for the Championship III. Ukraine originally qualified for the Championship II but withdrew and Turkey was asked to take over the place but declined. The second highest-ranked team in the qualifiers Croatia accepted the invitation and was promoted. Gibraltar withdrew and when Ukraine wanted to rejoin the competition they were allowed back in the Championship III.

Dates	Event	Location	Quotas	Qualifiers
22–25 August 2024	EuroHockey Championship Qualifiers	Vienna, Austria	3	~~Croatia~~; Hungary; Lithuania; Ukraine
22–25 August 2024	EuroHockey Championship Qualifiers	Dublin, Ireland	3	Luxembourg; Malta; Turkey
—N/a	FIH Men's World Ranking	—N/a	2	Bulgaria; Finland; ~~Gibraltar~~
Total			8	

== Preliminary round ==
=== Pool A ===
Pos	Team	Pld	W	D	L	GF	GA	GD	Pts	Qualification
1	Ukraine	3	3	0	0	34	2	+32	9	Semi-finals
2	Bulgaria	3	2	0	1	5	18	−13	6	Semi-finals
3	Malta	3	1	0	2	8	14	−6	3	
4	Hungary	3	0	0	3	4	17	−13	0	

Source: FIH
Rules for classification: 1) points; 2) matches won; 3) goal difference; 4) goals for; 5) head-to-head result; 6) field goals for.

28 July 2025
09:00

Ukraine	9–1	Malta
Yakovenko 10'; Solomianyi 13', 15', 20'; Shevchuk 25'; Tsymbaliuk 42'; Luppa 43'; Popov 49'; Boiko 59'	Report	Amore 33'

Umpires:
Simo Makela (FIN)
Steven Bakker (NED)

28 July 2025
11:15

Hungary	1–2	Bulgaria
Wesselenyi 28'	Report	Baklev 37'; Balev 39'

Umpires:
Jaroslav Suchocki (LTU)
Mahmut Çilkiz (TUR)

29 July 2025
09:00

Hungary	1–10	Ukraine
Kozári 58'	Report	Koshelenko 1'; Onofriiuk 9', 43', 48'; Boiko 15'; Solomianyi 16'; Shevchuk 23', 44'; Kostechko 49'; Popov 60'

Umpires:
Mahmut Çilkiz (TUR)
Jesus Medinilla (ESP)

29 July 2025
11:15

Malta	2–3	Bulgaria
K. Bajada 25'; T. Degiovanni 43'	Report	Georgiev 49'; Pavlov 50'; Baklev 55'

Umpires:
Jaroslav Suchocki (LTU)
Aaron Saunders (IRL)

30 July 2025
09:15

Malta	5–2	Hungary
T. Degiovanni 1', 43'; K. Bajada 19'; Agius 20', 49'	Report	Csőgör 50'; Kozári 57'

Umpires:
Marcel Knakowski (GER)
Aaron Saunders (IRL)

30 July 2025
11:15

Ukraine	15–0	Bulgaria
Koshelenko 4', 17', 21', 50', 53'; Semeniushko 7', 44'; Solomianyi 14', 37', 43'; Popov 17'; Zhmereniuk 20'; Luppa 40'; Yakovenko 47'; Tsymbaliuk 60'	Report

Umpires:
Mahmut Çilkiz (TUR)
Simo Makela (FIN)

=== Pool B ===
Pos	Team	Pld	W	D	L	GF	GA	GD	Pts	Qualification
1	Turkey (H)	3	3	0	0	18	0	+18	9	Semi-finals
2	Lithuania	3	2	0	1	5	9	−4	6	Semi-finals
3	Luxembourg	3	0	1	2	3	10	−7	1	
4	Finland	3	0	1	2	2	9	−7	1	

Source: FIH
Rules for classification: 1) points; 2) matches won; 3) goal difference; 4) goals for; 5) head-to-head result; 6) field goals for.
(H) Hosts

28 July 2025
16:00

Finland	2–2	Luxembourg
Lehmus 18'; Könönen 50'	Report	Lutgen 16'; Singh 44'

Umpires:
Keith Calleja (MLT)
Jesus Medinilla (ESP)

28 July 2025
18:15

Turkey	8–0	Lithuania
M. Aydin 13', 15'; C. Aydin 21'; A. A. Özkiliç 32'; F. M. Özkiliç 42'; Öz 44'; Ataş 58'; Elagöz 59'	Report

Umpires:
Maksym Perepelytsya (UKR)
Marcel Knakowski (GER)

29 July 2025
16:00

Lithuania	3–1	Luxembourg
Sinkevičius 10', 12', 33'	Report	Lutgen 53'

Umpires:
Keith Calleja (MLT)
Marcel Knakowski (GER)

29 July 2025
18:15

Finland	0–5	Turkey
	Report	Ataş 25', 41'; M. Aydin 37'; A. A. Özkiliç 43'; Elagöz 59'

Umpires:
Steven Bakker (NED)
Maksym Perepelytsya (UKR)

30 July 2025
16:00

Lithuania	2–0	Finland
Sinkevičius 7', 53'	Report

Umpires:
Keith Calleja (MLT)
Maksym Perepelutsya (UKR)

30 July 2025
18:15

Turkey	5–0	Luxembourg
A. A. Özkiliç 19', 32'; Ekinci 33'; Elagöz 42'; Öz 55'	Report

Umpires:
Jesus Medinilla (ESP)
Steven Bakker (NED)

== Fifth to eighth place classification ==
The points obtained in the preliminary round against the other team were carried over.

=== Pool C ===
Pos	Team	Pld	W	D	L	GF	GA	GD	Pts
1	Finland	3	2	1	0	6	4	+2	7
2	Malta	3	2	0	1	12	3	+9	6
3	Hungary	3	1	0	2	6	9	−3	3
4	Luxembourg	3	0	1	2	3	11	−8	1

Source: FIH
Rules for classification: 1) points; 2) matches won; 3) goal difference; 4) goals for; 5) head-to-head result; 6) field goals for.

1 August 2025
09:00

Hungary	2–3	Finland
Hortobágyi 30'; Leber 57'	Report	Määttänen 14'; Könönen 24', 48'

Umpires:
Keith Calleja (MLT)
Aaron Saunders (IRL)

1 August 2025
11:15

Malta	7–0	Luxembourg
K. Bajada 3', 38'; Borg Constanzi 13'; L. Bajada 25', 36', 40'; Amore 43'	Report

Umpires:
Jaroslav Suchocki (LTU)
Simo Makela (FIN)

2 August 2025
08:30

Malta	0–1	Finland
	Report	Rihtilä 45'

Umpires:
Mahmut Çilkiz (TUR)
Aaron Saunders (IRL)

2 August 2025
10:45

Luxembourg	1–2	Hungary
Prost-Gargoz 50'	Report	Szóga 49'; Leber 53'

Umpires:
Simo Makela (FIN)
Jaroslav Suchocki (LTU)

== First to fourth place classification ==
=== Bracket ===
Semi-finals
1 August
Ukraine	5
Lithuania	0
1 August
Turkey	13
Bulgaria	0

Final
2 August
Ukraine	9
Turkey	5
Third place
2 August
Lithuania	3
Bulgaria	1

=== Semi-finals ===
1 August 2025
13:30

Ukraine	5–0	Lithuania
Solomianyi 6', 42'; Onofriiuk 14', 39', 41'	Report

Umpires:
Mahmut Çilkiz (TUR)
Steven Bakker (NED)

1 August 2025
15:45

Turkey	13–0	Bulgaria
Elagöz 11'; A. A. Özkiliç 14', 26', 45', 54', 55'; Ekinci 14', 60'; M. Aydin 19', 24'; C. Aydin 23'; Kayar 38'; Öz 42'	Report

Umpires:
Marcel Knakowski (GER)
Maksym Perepelytsya (UKR)

=== Third and fourth place ===
2 August 2025
13:00

Lithuania	3–1	Bulgaria
Sinkevičius 8'; Vaikenas 39', 52'	Report	Grozkov 60'

Umpires:
Steven Bakker (NED)
Maksym Perepelytsya (UKR)

=== Final ===
2 August 2025
15:15

Ukraine	9–5	Turkey
Onofriiuk 12', 36', 60'; Koshelenko 20', 30', 35', 51'; Semeniushko 51'; Popov 59'	Report	Elagöz 21', 52'; Ekinci 44', 55'; M. Aydin 57'

Umpires:
Marcel Knakowski (GER)
Jesus Medinilla (ESP)

== Statistics ==
=== Final standings ===
Pos	Team	Qualification
1	Ukraine	2027 EuroHockey Championship Qualifier I
2	Turkey (H)	2027 EuroHockey Championship Qualifier I
3	Lithuania	2027 EuroHockey Championship Qualifier II
4	Bulgaria	2027 EuroHockey Championship Qualifier II
5	Finland	2027 EuroHockey Championship Qualifier II
6	Malta	2027 EuroHockey Championship Qualifier II
7	Hungary	2027 EuroHockey Championship Qualifier II
8	Luxembourg	2027 EuroHockey Championship Qualifier II

Source: FIH
(H) Host

=== Awards ===
The following awards were given at the conclusion of the tournament.

Award	Player
Player of the Tournament	(Ukraine) Dmytro Luppa
Leading goalscorer	(Ukraine) Andrii Koshelenko
Goalkeeper of the Tournament	(Ukraine) Bohdan Tovstolytkin

=== Goalscorers ===
There were 131 goals scored in 20 matches, for an average of 6.55 goals per match (as of completed).

10 goals

- (Ukraine) Andrii Koshelenko

9 goals

- (Turkey) Ali Akin Özkiliç
- (Ukraine) Maksym Onofriiuk

6 goals

- (Lithuania) Povilas Sinkevičius
- (Turkey) Mehmet Aydin
- (Turkey) Müslüm Elagöz

5 goals

- (Turkey) Müslüm Ekinci

4 goals

- (Malta) Keith Bajada
- (Ukraine) Oleksii Popov

3 goals

- (Finland) Emil Könönen
- (Malta) Luke Bajada
- (Malta) Thomas Degiovanni
- (Turkey) Furkan Ataş
- (Turkey) Zeynel Öz
- (Ukraine) Vitalii Semeniushko
- (Ukraine) Vitalii Shevchuk
- (Ukraine) Oleksandr Solomianyi

2 goals

- (Bulgaria) Georgi Baklev
- (Hungary) Benedek Kozári
- (Hungary) Sebastian Leber
- (Lithuania) Dominykas Vaikenas
- (Luxembourg) Oscar Lutgen
- (Malta) Christ Agius
- (Malta) Alessandro Amore
- (Turkey) Celal Aydin
- (Ukraine) Oleksandr Boiko
- (Ukraine) Dmytro Luppa
- (Ukraine) Rostyslav Takovenko
- (Ukraine) Vladyslav Tsymbaliuk

1 goal

- (Bulgaria) Ventsislav Balev
- (Bulgaria) Valentin Georgiev
- (Bulgaria) Radoslav Grozkov
- (Bulgaria) Bogomil Pavlov
- (Finland) Aaron Lehmus
- (Finland) Santeri Määttänen
- (Finland) Elmeri Rihtilä
- (Hungary) Martin Csőgör
- (Hungary) András Hortobágyi
- (Hungary) Zsigmond Szóga
- (Hungary) Marton Wesselenyi
- (Luxembourg) Loic Prost-Gargoz
- (Luxembourg) Pavel Singh
- (Malta) Luke Borg Constanzi
- (Turkey) Ramazan Kayar
- (Turkey) Furkan Mehmet Özkiliç
- (Ukraine) Volodymyr Kostechko
- (Ukraine) Volodymyr Zhmereniuk

Source: FIH

== See also ==
- 2025 Men's EuroHockey Championship II
- 2025 Women's EuroHockey Championship III
