= 2011 Men's EuroHockey Championship IV =

Field hockey tournament

Tournament details
- Host country: Greece
- City: Athens
- Dates: 2–7 August
- Teams: 5 (from 1 confederation)

Final positions
- Champions: Turkey (1st title)
- Runner-up: Greece
- Third place: Bulgaria

Tournament statistics
- Matches played: 10
- Goals scored: 57 (5.7 per match)

The 2011 Men's EuroHockey Championship IV was the fourth edition of the EuroHockey Championship IV, the fourth level of the men's European field hockey championships organized by the European Hockey Federation. It was held in Athens, Greece from 2 to 7 August 2011.

Turkey won their first EuroHockey Championship IV title and were promoted to EuroHockey Championship III.

== Results ==
=== Standings ===
Pos	Team	Pld	W	D	L	GF	GA	GD	Pts	Promotion
1	Turkey	4	4	0	0	21	2	+19	12	EuroHockey Championship III
2	Greece (H)	4	3	0	1	21	3	+18	9	
3	Bulgaria	4	2	0	2	13	8	+5	6	
4	Cyprus	4	0	1	3	1	20	−19	1	
5	Georgia	4	0	1	3	1	24	−23	1	

Source: TheSports.org
(H) Hosts

=== Matches ===
2 August 2011

Greece	9–0	Cyprus

2 August 2011

Turkey	10–0	Georgia

3 August 2011

Bulgaria	3–0	Cyprus

3 August 2011

Greece	5–0	Georgia

4 August 2011

Georgia	1–1	Cyprus

4 August 2011

Turkey	2–1	Bulgaria

6 August 2011

Cyprus	0–7	Turkey

6 August 2011

Greece	6–1	Bulgaria

7 August 2011

Turkey	2–1	Greece

7 August 2011

Bulgaria	8–0	Georgia

== See also ==
- 2011 Men's EuroHockey Championship III
