= 2018–19 Men's Hockey Series =

International field hockey competition

Tournament details
- Teams: 55 (from 5 confederations)
- Venue(s): 12 (in 12 host cities)

Final positions
- Champions: Canada; India; France

Tournament statistics
- Matches played: 163
- Goals scored: 1130 (6.93 per match)

The 2018–19 Men's Hockey Series was the inaugural season of the Hockey Series, a field hockey championship for men's national teams. The tournament started in June 2018 and finished in June 2019.

== Format ==
The Hockey Series was open to all national teams that were not playing in the Pro League.

The Hockey Series took place in two rounds, the Open and the Finals. The nine highest-ranked teams in the FIH World Rankings (as of 9 June 2017) skipped the Open and advanced directly to the Finals. All other national teams played in the Hockey Series Open, which featured eight regional events with up to six teams each. Fifteen teams qualified from the Hockey Series Open to the FIH Series Finals, for a total of 24 teams in the Finals. Those teams played in three events, with eight teams per event (three automatic qualifiers and five that advanced from the Open).

The top two placed teams in each of the Finals events qualified for the 2019 FIH Olympic Qualifiers. In this qualification event, they were joined by the top four placed teams from the Pro League, and the four highest ranked teams not already qualified. The teams will be drawn and play a two-legged tie to determine seven qualified nations for the Olympic Games.

== Schedule ==
=== Hockey Series Open ===
| Dates | Location | Teams | Hockey Series Finals quotas | Hockey Series Finals qualifier(s) |
|---|---|---|---|---|
| 5–10 June 2018 | Salamanca, Mexico | Costa Rica; Mexico; Panama; Puerto Rico; United States | 2 | United States; Mexico |
| 23 June – 1 July 2018 | Singapore | Chinese Taipei; Hong Kong; Indonesia; Myanmar; Singapore; Thailand | 1 | Singapore; ~~Thailand~~ |
| 25–30 June 2018 | Zagreb, Croatia | Austria; Croatia; Slovakia; Switzerland; Wales | 2 | Austria; Wales |
| 15–18 August 2018 | Port Vila, Vanuatu | Fiji; Solomon Islands; Tonga; Vanuatu | 0 | ~~Vanuatu~~ |
| 28 August – 2 September 2018 | Gniezno, Poland | Cyprus; Czech Republic; Italy; Lithuania; Poland; Ukraine | 2 | Poland; Italy |
| 4–9 September 2018 | Lousada, Portugal | Belarus; Gibraltar; Portugal; Russia; Scotland; Turkey | 2 | Russia; Scotland |
| 18–23 September 2018 | Santiago, Chile | Bolivia; Brazil; Chile; Peru; Uruguay; Venezuela | 2 | Chile; Brazil |
| ~~25–30 September 2018~~ | ~~Lahore, Pakistan~~ | ~~Afghanistan~~; ~~Bangladesh~~; ~~Kazakhstan~~; ~~Oman~~; ~~Qatar~~; ~~Sri Lanka~~ | 0 | Cancelled |
| 7–9 December 2018 | Bulawayo, Zimbabwe | Egypt; Namibia; Zambia; Zimbabwe | 1 | Egypt |
| 17–22 December 2018 | Lahore, Pakistan | Afghanistan; Kazakhstan; Nepal; Uzbekistan | 1 | Uzbekistan |
| 21 January 2019 | Appointed by the FIH | | 2 | Ukraine (Note: Ukraine qualified as the highest ranked nation not already qualified via the other two routes); Belarus (Note: Belarus replaced Vanuatu) |
| Total | | | 15 | |

=== FIH Series Finals ===
The pools and venues were announced on 23 October 2018 with three teams still to qualify. The final pools were confirmed on 21 January 2019.

| Dates | Location | Teams Qualified | | Olympic Qualifier Quotas | Olympic Qualifier Qualifiers |
| Dates | Location | By Ranking | From Hockey Series Open | Olympic Qualifier Quotas | Olympic Qualifier Qualifiers |
|---|---|---|---|---|---|
| 26 April – 4 May 2019 | Kuala Lumpur, Malaysia | Belarus; Canada; China; Malaysia | Austria; Brazil; Italy; ~~Vanuatu~~; Wales (Note: Scotland and Wales cannot qualify for the Olympic Games Qualifiers because England are the nominated country for Great Britain’s qualification pathway.) | 2 | Canada; Malaysia |
| 6–16 June 2019 | Bhubaneswar, India | India; Japan (Note: Japan cannot qualify for the Olympic Games Qualifiers because they have already qualified as hosts and winners of the Asian Games.); South Africa | Mexico; Poland; Russia; United States; Uzbekistan | 2 | India; South Africa |
| 15–23 June 2019 | Le Touquet, France | France; Ireland; South Korea; Ukraine | Chile; Singapore; Scotland; Egypt | 2 | France; Ireland |
| Total | | | | 6 | |

== See also ==
- 2018–19 Women's Hockey Series
- 2019 Men's FIH Pro League
