= 2009 Men's EuroHockey Nations Challenge II =

Field hockey tournament

Tournament details
- Host country: Slovakia
- City: Bratislava
- Dates: 25–31 July
- Teams: 4 (from 1 confederation)
- Venue: National Stadium of Pavel Rosa

Final positions
- Champions: Gibraltar (1st title)
- Runner-up: Slovakia
- Third place: Bulgaria

Tournament statistics
- Matches played: 12
- Goals scored: 52 (4.33 per match)

The 2009 Men's EuroHockey Nations Challenge II was the third edition of the EuroHockey Nations Challenge II, the fourth level of the men's European field hockey championships organized by the European Hockey Federation. It was held in Bratislava, Slovakia from 25 to 31 July 2009.

Gibraltar won their first EuroHockey Nations Challenge II title and were promoted to EuroHockey Championship III together with the hosts Slovakia.

== Results ==
=== Standings ===
| Pos | Team | Pld | W | D | L | GF | GA | GD | Pts | Promotion |
|---|---|---|---|---|---|---|---|---|---|---|
| 1 | Gibraltar | 6 | 5 | 1 | 0 | 22 | 9 | +13 | 16 | EuroHockey Championship III |
| 2 | Slovakia (H) | 6 | 3 | 0 | 3 | 16 | 10 | +6 | 9 | EuroHockey Championship III |
| 3 | Bulgaria | 6 | 1 | 2 | 3 | 7 | 14 | −7 | 5 | |
| 4 | Greece | 6 | 1 | 1 | 4 | 7 | 19 | −12 | 4 | |

Source: TheSports.org
(H) Hosts

=== Matches ===
25 July 2009

| Slovakia | 1–0 | Bulgaria |

25 July 2009

| Gibraltar | 3–2 | Greece |

26 July 2009

| Greece | 1–2 | Bulgaria |

26 July 2009

| Slovakia | 1–4 | Gibraltar |

27 July 2009

| Greece | 0–7 | Slovakia |

27 July 2009

| Gibraltar | 6–2 | Bulgaria |

29 July 2009

| Bulgaria | 0–3 | Slovakia |

29 July 2009

| Greece | 0–4 | Gibraltar |

30 July 2009

| Bulgaria | 1–1 | Greece |

30 July 2009

| Gibraltar | 3–2 | Slovakia |

31 July 2009

| Bulgaria | 2–2 | Gibraltar |

31 July 2009

| Slovakia | 2–3 | Greece |

== See also ==
- 2009 Men's EuroHockey Nations Challenge I
