= 2011 Men's EuroHockey Championship III =

Field hockey tournament

Tournament details
- Host country: Italy
- City: Catania
- Dates: 24–30 July
- Teams: 7 (from 1 confederation)

Final positions
- Champions: Azerbaijan (1st title)
- Runner-up: Italy
- Third place: Gibraltar

Tournament statistics
- Matches played: 15
- Goals scored: 86 (5.73 per match)

The 2011 Men's EuroHockey Championship III was the 4th edition of the Men's EuroHockey Championship III, the third level of the men's European field hockey championships organized by the European Hockey Federation. It was held from 23 to 30 July 2011 in Catania, Italy.

The tournament also served as a qualifier for the 2013 Men's EuroHockey Championship II, with the champions and runners-up, Azerbaijan and Italy, respectively, qualifying.

== Qualified teams ==
The following seven teams, shown with pre-tournament world rankings, competed in the tournament.

Dates	Event	Location	Quotas	Qualifiers
1—8 August 2009	2009 EuroHockey Nations Trophy	Wrexham, Wales	2	Italy (28); Switzerland (36)
25–31 July 2009	2009 EuroHockey Challenge I	Zagreb, Croatia	3	Portugal (50); Azerbaijan (37); Croatia (48)
25–31 July 2009	2009 EuroHockey Challenge II	Bratislava, Slovakia	2	Gibraltar (44); Slovakia (51)
Total			7	

== Results ==
All times are local (UTC+2).

=== Preliminary round ===
==== Pool A ====
Pos	Team	Pld	W	D	L	GF	GA	GD	Pts	Qualification
1	Azerbaijan	2	1	1	0	8	4	+4	4	Semi-finals
2	Italy (H)	2	0	2	0	4	4	0	2	Semi-finals
3	Croatia	2	0	1	1	4	8	−4	1	Pool C

Source: TheSports.org
(H) Hosts

24 July 2011

Italy	2–2	Croatia

26 July 2011

Croatia	2–6	Azerbaijan

27 July 2011

Azerbaijan	2–2	Italy

==== Pool B ====
Pos	Team	Pld	W	D	L	GF	GA	GD	Pts	Qualification
1	Switzerland	3	2	1	0	10	3	+7	7	Semi-finals
2	Gibraltar	3	2	0	1	10	9	+1	6	Semi-finals
3	Portugal	3	1	1	1	10	9	+1	4	Pool C
4	Slovakia	3	0	0	3	5	14	−9	0	Pool C

Source: TheSports.org

24 July 2011

Switzerland	3–1	Gibraltar

24 July 2011

Portugal	5–2	Slovakia

25 July 2011

Portugal	2–2	Switzerland

25 July 2011

Gibraltar	4–3	Slovakia

27 July 2011

Slovakia	0–5	Switzerland

27 July 2011

Gibraltar	5–3	Portugal

=== Fifth to seventh place classification ===
==== Pool C ====
The points obtained in the preliminary round against the other team are taken over.

Pos	Team	Pld	W	D	L	GF	GA	GD	Pts
5	Croatia	2	2	0	0	8	2	+6	6
6	Portugal	2	1	0	1	6	7	−1	3
7	Slovakia	2	0	0	2	3	8	−5	0

Source: TheSports.org

29 July 2011

Croatia	5–1	Portugal

30 July 2011

Croatia	3–1	Slovakia

=== First to fourth place classification ===
Semi-finals
29 July
Italy	3
Switzerland	2
29 July
Azerbaijan	4
Gibraltar	2

Final
30 July
Italy	2
Azerbaijan	3
Third place
30 July
Switzerland	4
Gibraltar	5

==== Semi-finals ====
29 July 2011

Italy	3–2	Switzerland

29 July 2011

Azerbaijan	4–2	Gibraltar

==== Third place game ====
30 July 2011

Switzerland	4–5	Gibraltar

==== Final ====
30 July 2011

Italy	2–3	Azerbaijan

== Final standings ==
Rank	Team
Gold medal	Azerbaijan
Silver medal	Italy
Bronze medal	Gibraltar
4	Switzerland
5	Croatia
6	Portugal
7	Slovakia

Promoted to the EuroHockey Championship II

== See also ==
- 2011 Men's EuroHockey Championship II
- 2011 Men's EuroHockey Championship IV
