= Slovakia men's national field hockey team =

Slovakia
- Association: Slovak Hockey Association (Slovenský Zväz Pozemného Hokeja)
- Confederation: EHF (Europe)

FIH ranking
- Current: 54 ▼1 (4 October 2026)
- Highest: 49 (November 2015 – December 2015, October 2016, April 2021–present)
- Lowest: 62 (2008)

Slovakia men's national field hockey team represents Slovakia in men's international field hockey and is controlled by the Slovak Hockey Association, the governing body for field hockey in Slovakia.

Slovakia has never qualified for the Summer Olympics, World Cup or the EuroHockey Championship, they mainly compete in the EuroHockey Championship III, the third level of the European field hockey championships.

== Competitive record ==
=== EuroHockey Championships ===
EuroHockey Championships record
Year	Level	Position	Pld	W	D	L	GF	GA	P/R
2005	Did not enter								
(Slovenia) 2007	IV	5th	4	2	0	2	6	8	Same position
(Slovakia) 2009	IV	2nd	6	3	0	3	16	10	▲
(Italy) 2011	III	7th	4	0	0	4	6	17	Same position
(Switzerland) 2013	III	8th	5	0	0	5	7	33	▼
(Lithuania) 2015	IV	1st	5	4	1	0	22	10	▲
(Croatia) 2017	III	7th	4	1	0	3	5	16	Same position
(Gibraltar) 2019	III	6th	5	2	0	3	10	18	Same position
(Portugal) 2021	III	5th	5	1	1	3	7	14	Same position
2023	Did not enter								
2025	Did not enter								
Total	Highest: III		38	13	2	23	79	126	–

=== Hockey World League and FIH Series ===
Hockey World League and FIH Series record
Season	Position	Round	Pld	W	D *	L	GF	GA
2012–13	Did not enter							
2014–15	Unranked	Round 1	4	1	0	3	8	20
2016–17	Unranked	Round 1	4	0	0	4	4	34
2018–19	—N/a	Open	4	0	0	4	4	29
Total	–	1st round	12	1	0	11	16	83

== See also ==
- Czechoslovakia men's national field hockey team
- Slovakia women's national field hockey team
