= Greece men's national field hockey team =

Greece
- Association: Hellenic Hockey Federation
- Confederation: EHF (Europe)
| Home | Away |

FIH ranking
- Current: NR (18 June 2026)
- Highest: 50 (2003–2006)
- Lowest: 79 (October 2016 – July 2017)

The Greece men's national field hockey team represents Greece in men's international field hockey competitions.

== Tournament record ==
=== EuroHockey Championship III ===
- 2005 – 5th place
- 2015 – Withdrew

=== EuroHockey Championship IV ===
- 2009 – 4th place
- 2011 – (silver)
- 2013 – (gold)

== Results and fixtures ==
The following is a list of match results in the last 12 months, as well as any future matches that have been scheduled.

Win Draw Loss Fixture

=== 2026 ===
==== EuroHockey Championship Qualifier II ====
| 9 July 2026 Pool B | Malta | 3–2 | Greece | Helsinki, Finland |
| 16:15 | Degiovanni 40', 57'; Ellul-Turner 59' | Report | Welzel 34', 34' | Stadium: Velodromi Outdoor |

| 10 July 2026 Pool B | Gibraltar | 2–0 | Greece | Helsinki, Finland |
| 16:15 | Rodriguez 11'; Bossano-Anes 11' | Report | | Stadium: Velodromi Outdoor |

| 11 July 2026 Pool B | Finland | 2–2 | Greece | Helsinki, Finland |
| 18:15 | Könönen 45', 59' | Report | Dierckx 25'; Welzel 43' | Stadium: Velodromi Outdoor |

== See also ==
- Greece women's national field hockey team
