= Joe Naughalty =

Welsh field hockey player (born 1987)

JoeNaughalty
Personal information
- Born: 13 April 1987 (age 39) Bristol, England

Sport
- Sport: Field hockey
- Position: Midfield
Senior career
Years	Team	Caps	Goals
2005–2013	Cardiff & Met	-	-
2013–2016	East Grinstead	-	-
2017–2018	Brighton & Hove	-	-
2019–2021	East Grinstead	-	-
2021–2024	Brighton & Hove	-	-
2024–2025	Sevenoaks	-	-
National team
Years	Team	Caps	Goals
2008–2023	Wales		-

Joseph Samuel Naughalty (born 13 April 1987) is a Welsh field hockey player who has represented Wales. He competed for Wales at the 2022 Commonwealth Games.

== Biography ==
Naughalty was born in Bristol, England but close to represent Wales. He studied Sports Development and Coaching at Cardiff Metropolitan University from 2005 to 2012 and made his Welsh debut in the 2008 Celtic Cup against Scotland.

His first club as a junior was Weston-super-Mare before he played for his University team Cardiff & Met. Naughalty retired from international hockey after several long-term injuries but in 2015, he decided to come out of international retirement and continue playing for Wales.

After university he played for East Grinstead in the Men's England Hockey League and then switched to Brighton & Hove, where he was named the player of the year during the 2017/2018 season.

Naughalty participated for Wales in the 2019 Men's EuroHockey Championship and the 2021 Men's EuroHockey Championship before being selected to represent Wales at the 2022 Commonwealth Games in Birmingham, helping his nation to a sixth-place finish during the men's tournament after being defeated by New Zealand in the fifth place play off match on 7 August 2022.

In 2023, he scored a goal that sealed a place for Wales at their first ever World Cup, qualifying for the 2023 World Cup.

After a second spell with East Grinstead, he returned to Brighton & Hove as their player coach before moving to Sevenoaks as a player/coach for the 2024–25 season. Since 2019 he has been the Head of Hockey at Ardingly College.
