= Azerbaijan men's national field hockey team =

National sports team

Azerbaijan
- Association: Azerbaijan Field Hockey Federation
- Confederation: EHF (Europe)

FIH ranking
- Current: NR (19 December 2025)
- Highest: 26 (June 2016 – August 2016)
- Lowest: 60 (June 2019)

The Azerbaijan men's national field hockey team represents Azerbaijan in international men's field hockey and is controlled by the Azerbaijan Field Hockey Federation, the governing body for field hockey in Azerbaijan.

The national team hasn't participated in any international competitions since November 2016 because the national association was suspended on 12 November 2016.

== Competitive record ==
=== European championships ===
EuroHockey Championships record
Year	Level	Position	Pld	W	D*	L	GF	GA	P/R
(Malta) 2005	IV	2nd	5	4	0	1	12	5	▲
(Russia) 2007	III	4th	5	2	0	3	9	19	Same position
(Croatia) 2009	III	4th	4	1	2	1	10	8	Same position
(Italy) 2011	III	1st	4	3	1	0	15	8	▲
(Austria) 2013	II	4th	5	2	0	3	9	17	Same position
(Czech Republic) 2015	II	5th	5	2	1	2	11	9	Same position
2017	Did not participate								
2019	Did not participate								
2021	Did not participate								
Total	Highest: II		28	14	4	10	66	66	–

*Draws include matches decided on a penalty shoot-out.

=== Hockey World League ===
Hockey World League record
Season	Position	Round	Pld	W	D *	L	GF	GA
2012–13	Unranked	Round 1	3	3	0	0	11	4
2012–13	Unranked	Round 2	Withdrew					
2014–15	31st	Round 1	3	2	1	0	17	4
2014–15	31st	Round 2	6	1	1	4	12	22
2016–17	Did not participate							
Total	31st (1x)	Round 2 (1x)	12	6	2	4	40	30

*Draws include matches decided on a penalty shoot-out.

== See also ==
- Azerbaijan women's national field hockey team
