= Gibraltar men's national field hockey team =

Gibraltar
- Association: Gibraltar Hockey
- Confederation: EHF (Europe)
- Head Coach: Christian Zammit
- Assistant coach(es): Dominic Hernandez
- Manager: Nathan Stagno
- Captain: Carl Ramagge
Home	Away

FIH ranking
- Current: 50 (23 September 2026)
- Highest: 43 (2012)
- Lowest: 73 (April 2017 – July 2017)

EuroHockey Championship
- Appearances: 1 (first in 1978)
- Best result: 12th (1978)

The Gibraltar men's national field hockey team represents Gibraltar in international men's field hockey and is controlled by Gibraltar Hockey.

== Competitive record ==
Gibraltar has never qualified for the World Cup (they are not eligible for the Summer Olympics due to a lack of IOC membership). They have however participated once in the European championship, in 1978 where they finished 12th out of 12.

=== European championships ===
EuroHockey Nations Championship record
Year	Round	Position	Pld	W	D	L	GF	GA
(Belgium) 1970	did not participate							
(Spain) 1974	did not participate							
(West Germany) 1978	11th place game	12th	7	0	1	6	4	27
(Netherlands) 1983 until (Germany) 2025	did not qualify							
Total	12th place	1/20	7	0	1	6	4	27

EuroHockey Championships record
Year	Level	Position	Pld	W	D	L	GF	GA	P/R
(Ukraine) 2005	III	3rd	5	3	0	2	19	12	Same position
(Russia) 2007	III	did not participate							▼
(Slovakia) 2009	IV	1st	6	5	1	0	22	9	▲
(Italy) 2011	III	3rd	5	3	0	2	17	17	Same position
(Switzerland) 2013	III	5th	5	3	0	2	17	14	Same position
(Portugal) 2015	III	did not participate							▼
(Slovenia) 2017	IV	1st	4	4	0	0	32	5	▲
(Gibraltar) 2019	III	3rd	5	2	2	1	14	8	Same position
(Portugal) 2021	III	Withdrew							
(Poland) 2023	III	3rd	5	3	0	2	16	16	Same position
(Turkey) 2025	III	Withdrew							
2027	II	Qualified							
Total	Highest: III		35	23	3	9	151	81	–

=== Hockey World League and FIH Series ===
Hockey World League & FIH Series record
Season	Position	Round	Pld	W	D *	L	GF	GA
2012–13	Unranked	Round 1	4	1	2	1	7	11
2014–15	did not participate							
2016–17	did not participate							
2018–19	—N/a	Open	5	1	1	3	8	15
Total	–	1st Round	9	2	3	4	15	26

*Draws include matches decided on a penalty shoot-out.

== Results and fixtures ==
The following is a list of match results in the last 12 months, as well as any future matches that have been scheduled.

Win Draw Loss Fixture

=== 2026 ===
==== EuroHockey Championship Qualifier II ====
9 July 2026 Pool B	Finland	0–3	Gibraltar	Helsinki, Finland
18:30		Report	Lopez 20'; Hernandez 22'; Dobinson 38'	Stadium: Velodromi Outdoor

10 July 2026 Pool B	Gibraltar	2–0	Greece	Helsinki, Finland
16:15	Rodriguez 11'; Bossano-Anes 11'	Report		Stadium: Velodromi Outdoor

11 July 2026 Pool B	Gibraltar	2–2	Malta	Helsinki, Finland
16:00	Bossano-Anes 48'; Cox 52'	Report	Degiovanni 22'; Rapinett 29'	Stadium: Velodromi Outdoor

12 July 2026 Final	Lithuania	3–3 (2–1 p)	Gibraltar	Helsinki, Finland
17:45	Petkevič 7'; Sinkevičiius 30', 33'	Report	Bossano-Annes 30+', 32'; Lopez 54'	Stadium: Velodromi Outdoor
	Penalties
	Sinkevičius (penalty shoot-out scored); Ridlauskas (penalty shoot-out missed); Lopato (penalty shoot-out missed); Stankevič (penalty shoot-out scored)		(penalty shoot-out scored) Cox; (penalty shoot-out missed) Duo; (penalty shoot-out missed) Bossano-Anes; (penalty shoot-out missed) Caetano; (penalty shoot-out missed) Lopez

== See also ==
- Gibraltar women's national field hockey team
