= Turkey men's national field hockey team =

Turkey
- Association: Turkish Hockey Federation
- Confederation: EHF (Europe)
- Head Coach: Kazim Koca
- Manager: Kemal Açikgöz
- Captain: Vakif Kilinc

FIH ranking
- Current: 45 ▼1 (4 October 2026)
- Highest: 44 (November 2015 – December 2015, October 2017 – December 2018)
- Lowest: 62 (2009 – 2010)

The Turkey men's national field hockey team represents Turkey in men's international field hockey competitions and is controlled by the Turkish Hockey Federation.

So far, Turkey has only competed in the Men's EuroHockey Championship III and EuroHockey Championship IV of the EuroHockey Nations Challenge, with their best ever result being 3rd in the 2021 Championship III and 1st in the 2011 Championship IV.

== Tournament record ==
=== EuroHockey Championship II ===
- 2023 – 8th place

==== Results ====
===== 2023 =====
1. Turkey 0-4 Italy
2. Turkey 2-5 Switzerland
3. Turkey 0-10 Scotland
4. Turkey 2-1 Portugal
5. Turkey 1-7 Czech Republic

1 Win / 4 Lose / GF 5 / GA 27 / GD -22

=== EuroHockey Championship III ===
- 2013 – 7th place
- 2015 – 5th place
- 2017 – 4th place
- 2019 – 5th place
- 2021 – (bronze)

=== EuroHockey Championship IV ===
- 2007 – (silver)
- 2011 – (gold)

=== Hockey World League ===
- 2012–13 – Round 1
- 2014–15 – Round 1
- 2016–17 – Round 1

=== FIH Hockey Series ===
- 2018–19 – First round

==== Results ====
===== 2018 =====
1. Turkey 2-7 Scotland
2. Turkey 1-17 Russia
3. Turkey 4-5 Portugal
4. Turkey 1-7 Belarus
5. Turkey 2-3 Gibraltar

5 Lose / GF 10 / GA 39 / GD -29

=== Men's EuroHockey U21 Championship ===
1. 2004 Men's EuroHockey Junior Championship III
2. 2006 Men's EuroHockey Junior Championship III
3. 2008 Men's EuroHockey Junior Championship II
4. 2014 Men's EuroHockey Junior Championship III
5. 2014 Men's EuroHockey Junior Championship III
6. 2017 Men's EuroHockey Junior Championship II
7. 2019 Men's EuroHockey Junior Championship II
8. 2022 Men's EuroHockey Junior Championship II
9. 2024 Men's EuroHockey U21 Championship

==== Results ====
===== 2019 =====
1. Turkey 3-1 Czech Republic
2. Turkey 4-0 Belarus
3. Turkey 1-7 Ireland
4. Turkey 4-5 Russia
5. Turkey 1-4 Ireland

2 Win / 3 Lose / GF 13 / GA 17 / GD -4

===== 2024 =====
1. Turkey 1-13 France
2. Turkey 1-8 Belgium
3. Turkey 1-15 Germany
4. Turkey 3-6 Ireland
5. Turkey 0-9 England

5 Lose / GF 6 / GA 52 / GD -46

===== 2025 =====
- 2025 Men's EuroHockey Championship Qualifiers
- 2025 Men's EuroHockey Championship III

https://www.eurohockey.org/calendar/event?id=4ea8b460-26e1-4ea7-8735-79274172aaed

1. Turkey 1-9 Czech Republic
2. Turkey 4-1 Luxembourg
3. Turkey 1-5 Italy

1. Turkey 8-0 Lithuania
2. Turkey 5-0 Finland
3. Turkey 5-0 Luxembourg
4. Turkey 13-0 Bulgaria
5. Turkey 5-7 Ukraine

== Results and fixtures ==
The following is a list of match results in the last 12 months, as well as any future matches that have been scheduled.

Win Draw Loss Fixture

=== 2026 ===
| 9 July 2026 EU Championship Qualifiers QF | Scotland | 6–1 | Turkey | Rome, Italy |
| 12:15 | McConnell 15'; J. Golden 25'; C. Golden 29'; Robb 44', 58'; Green 54' | Report | Aydin 38' |

| 11 July 2026 EU Championship Qualifiers 5/8 Classification | Turkey | 0–7 | Switzerland | Rome, Italy |
| 10:00 | | Report | Mohrhauer 7'; Kraxner 25'; Gloor 26'; Grandchamp 41'; Gassner 46'; Flück 48'; Thijs 53' |

| 12 July 2026 EU Championship Qualifiers 7/8 Classification | Turkey | 3–3 (4–2 p) | Ukraine | Rome, Italy |
| 09:15 | Kalkan 24'; Ekinci 27'; Karakuş 39' | Report | Koshelenko 6'; Riabchuk 38'; Solomianyi 58' |
| | Penalties |
| | Keleş (penalty shoot-out missed); Aydin (penalty shoot-out scored); Ataş (penalty shoot-out scored); Ekinci (penalty shoot-out scored); Elagöz (penalty shoot-out scored) | | (penalty shoot-out missed) Onofriiuk; (penalty shoot-out missed) Solomianyi; (penalty shoot-out scored) Kaplinskyi; (penalty shoot-out scored) Shevchuk |

== See also ==
- Turkey women's national field hockey team
