= Bulgaria men's national field hockey team =

Bulgaria
- Association: Bulgarian Hockey Federation
- Confederation: EHF (Europe)

FIH ranking
- Current: 102 ▼2 (18 June 2026)
- Highest: 53 (2009–2011)
- Lowest: 97 (January 2019)

The Bulgaria men's national field hockey team represents Bulgaria in international field hockey competitions.

== Tournament record ==
Bulgaria have never qualified for the Summer Olympics, World Cup or the EuroHockey Championship.

=== European championships ===
EuroHockey Championships record
Year	Level	Position	Pld	W	D	L	GF	GA	P/R
2005	Did not enter								
(Slovenia) 2007	IV	6th	4	1	0	3	7	9	Same position
(Slovakia) 2009	IV	3rd	6	1	2	3	7	14	Same position
(Greece) 2011	IV	3rd	4	2	0	2	13	8	Same position
(Greece) 2013	IV	2nd	4	2	0	2	9	7	Same position
2015	Did not enter								
2017	Did not enter								
2019	Did not enter								
2021	Did not enter								
2023	Did not enter								
(Turkey) 2025	III	4th	5	2	0	3	6	34	Same position
Total	Highest: III		23	8	2	13	42	72	–

=== World League ===
FIH Hockey World League record
Season	Position	Round	Pld	W	D	L	GF	GA
2012–13	Did not participate							
2014–15	Unranked	Round 1	4	2	0	2	4	22
2016–17	Did not participate							
Total	N/A	Round 1 (1x)	4	2	0	2	4	22

== See also ==
Bulgaria women's national field hockey team
