= 2013 Men's EuroHockey Championship III =

Field hockey tournament

Tournament details
- Host country: Switzerland
- City: Lausanne
- Dates: 12–18 August
- Teams: 8 (from 1 confederation)

Final positions
- Champions: Switzerland (1st title)
- Runner-up: Croatia
- Third place: Belarus

Tournament statistics
- Matches played: 20
- Goals scored: 132 (6.6 per match)

The 2013 Men's EuroHockey Championship III was the 5th edition of the men's EuroHockey Championship III, the third level of the European field hockey championships organized by the European Hockey Federation.

It was held from 12 to 18 August 2013 in Lausanne, Switzerland. The tournament also served as a qualifier for the 2015 Men's EuroHockey Championship II, with the finalists Switzerland and Croatia qualifying.

== Qualified teams ==
The following eight teams, shown with pre-tournament world rankings, competed in the tournament.

Event	Dates	Location	Quotas	Qualifier(s)
2011 EuroHockey Championship II	8—14 August 2011	Vinnytsia, Ukraine	2	Belarus (35); Sweden (37)
2011 EuroHockey Championship III	23–30 July 2011	Catania, Italy	5	Croatia (49); Gibraltar (41); Portugal (45); Slovakia (51); Switzerland (43)
2011 EuroHockey Championship IV	2–7 August 2011	Athens, Greece	1	Turkey (53)
Total			8	

== Results ==
All times are local (UTC+2).

=== Preliminary round ===
==== Pool A ====
Pos	Team	Pld	W	D	L	GF	GA	GD	Pts	Qualification
1	Croatia	3	2	1	0	9	6	+3	7	Semi-finals
2	Belarus	3	2	0	1	14	3	+11	6	Semi-finals
3	Gibraltar	3	1	0	2	8	9	−1	3	Pool C
4	Turkey	3	0	1	2	3	16	−13	1	Pool C

Source: TheSports.org

12 August 2013

Belarus	1–2	Croatia

12 August 2013

Gibraltar	5–0	Turkey

13 August 2013

Gibraltar	1–5	Belarus

13 August 2013

Croatia	3–3	Turkey

15 August 2013

Croatia	4–2	Gibraltar

15 August 2013

Belarus	8–0	Turkey

==== Pool B ====
Pos	Team	Pld	W	D	L	GF	GA	GD	Pts	Qualification
1	Switzerland (H)	3	3	0	0	14	1	+13	9	Semi-finals
2	Portugal	3	2	0	1	10	5	+5	6	Semi-finals
3	Sweden	3	1	0	2	8	8	0	3	Pool C
4	Slovakia	3	0	0	3	1	19	−18	0	Pool C

Source: TheSports.org
(H) Hosts

12 August 2013

Sweden	1–4	Portugal

12 August 2013

Switzerland	7–0	Slovakia

13 August 2013

Switzerland	4–1	Sweden

13 August 2013

Portugal	6–1	Slovakia

15 August 2013

Portugal	0–3	Switzerland

15 August 2013

Sweden	6–0	Slovakia

=== Fifth to eighth place classification ===
==== Pool C ====
The points obtained in the preliminary round against the other team are taken over.

Pos	Team	Pld	W	D	L	GF	GA	GD	Pts	Relegation
5	Gibraltar	3	3	0	0	14	5	+9	9	
6	Sweden	3	2	0	1	16	4	+12	6	
7	Turkey	3	1	0	2	9	16	−7	3	
8	Slovakia	3	0	0	3	6	20	−14	0	EuroHockey Championship IV

Source: TheSports.org

17 August 2013

Gibraltar	3–2	Sweden

17 August 2013

Turkey	8–3	Slovakia

18 August 2013

Turkey	1–8	Sweden

18 August 2013

Gibraltar	6–3	Slovakia

=== First to fourth place classification ===
Semi-finals
17 August
Belarus	2
Switzerland	5
17 August
Croatia	2
Portugal	1

Final
18 August
Switzerland	7
Croatia	1
Third place
18 August
Belarus	7
Portugal	6

==== Semi-finals ====
17 August 2013

Belarus	2–5	Switzerland

17 August 2013

Croatia	2–1	Portugal

==== Third and fourth place ====
18 August 2013

Belarus	7–6	Portugal

==== Final ====
18 August 2013

Switzerland	7–1	Croatia

== Final standings ==
Rank	Team
Gold medal	Switzerland
Silver medal	Croatia
Bronze medal	Belarus
4	Portugal
5	Gibraltar
6	Sweden
7	Turkey
8	Slovakia

Promoted to the EuroHockey Championship II

Relegated to the EuroHockey Championship IV
