= Croatia men's national field hockey team =

Croatia
- Association: Croatian Hockey Federation (Hrvatski Hokejski Savez)
- Confederation: EHF (Europe)
- Head Coach: Nikola Hanzek
- Assistant coach(es): Bernardo Fernandes
- Manager: Tomislav Barilar
- Captain: Filip Žlimen
Home	Away

FIH ranking
- Current: 42 (4 October 2026)
- Highest: 37 (August 2016)
- Lowest: 49 (2003–2006)

The Croatia men's national field hockey team represents Croatia in international field hockey competitions and is controlled by the Croatian Hockey Federation, the governing body for field hockey in Croatia.

Croatia has never qualified for the Summer Olympics, World Cup or the European Championship. They mainly compete in the EuroHockey Championship II and the EuroHockey Championship III, the second and third level of the EuroHockey Championships. As of June 2026, Croatia's men's field hockey team is placed 41st in the FIH world ranking.

== Tournament history ==
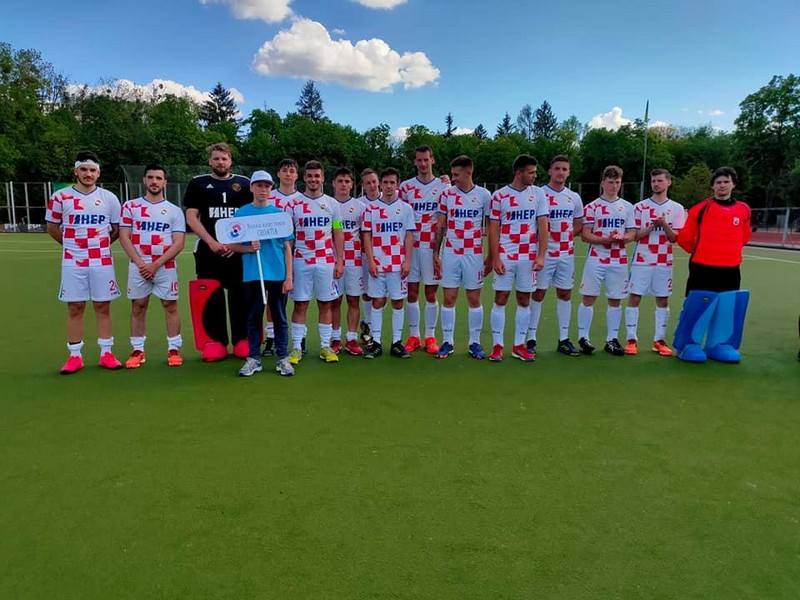
The team at Podillya Cup 2021 in Vinnytsia, Ukraine

=== European championships ===
EuroHockey Championships record
Year	Level	Position	Pld	W	D*	L	GF	GA	P/R
(Ukraine) 2005	III	4th	4	1	0	3	9	14	Same position
(Russia) 2007	III	3rd	6	3	1	2	16	22	Same position
(Croatia) 2009	III	5th	4	1	1	2	8	13	Same position
(Italy) 2011	III	5th	4	2	1	1	12	10	Same position
(Switzerland) 2013	III	2nd	5	3	1	1	12	14	▲
(Czech Republic) 2015	II	8th	5	1	0	4	11	29	▼
(Croatia) 2017	III	3rd	5	3	0	2	19	7	Same position
(Gibraltar) 2019	III	1st	5	4	1	0	23	7	▲
(Poland) 2021	II	8th	5	0	0	5	6	23	▼
(Poland) 2023	III	2nd	5	4	0	1	22	10	▲
(Portugal) 2025	II	7th	6	1	2	3	12	32	Same position
Total	Highest: II		54	23	6	24	150	181	–

=== Hockey World League ===
FIH Hockey World League record
Season	Position	Round	Pld	W	D *	L	GF	GA
2012–13	Did not participate							
2014–15	Unranked	Round 1	4	1	1	2	8	14
2016–17	Did not participate							
Total	N/A	Round 1 (1x)	4	1	1	2	8	14

*Draws include knockout matches decided on a penalty shoot-out.

=== Hockey Series ===
Hockey Series record
Season	Round	Pld	W	D *	L	GF	GA
2018–19	Open	4	2	0	2	10	13
Total	Open (1x)	4	2	0	2	10	13

== Results and fixtures ==
The following is a list of match results in the last 12 months, as well as any future matches that have been scheduled.

Win Draw Loss Fixture

=== 2026 ===
2027 EuroHockey Championship Qualifiers

9 July 2026 QF	Switzerland	2–3	Croatia	Rome, Italy
10:00	Flück 18'; Conrad 52'	Report	Perković 11'; Krleža 27', 41'

10 July 2026 SF	Scotland	6–4	Croatia	Rome, Italy
16:15	J. Golden 3', 41', 46'; Walker 5'; C. Golden 17'; Orr 52'	Report	Bachmann 32', 56'; Bahlen 37'; Mucić 49'

12 July 2026 3/4 Classification	Croatia	3–2	Portugal	Rome, Italy
13:45	Krleža 15+', 39', 47'	Report	Gomes 3'; Rodrigues 48'

== See also ==
- Croatia women's national field hockey team
- Yugoslavia men's national field hockey team
