= Portugal men's national field hockey team =

Portugal
- Association: Portuguese Hockey Federation (Federação Portuguesa de Hóquei)
- Confederation: EHF (Europe)
- Head Coach: Marcos Ferreira
- Assistant coach(es): Ricardo Morais
- Manager: José Rodrigues
- Captain: Luis Tavares
Home	Away

FIH ranking
- Current: 57 ▲1 (18 June 2026)
- Highest: 32 (2008)
- Lowest: 53 (2004)

EuroHockey Championship
- Appearances: 1 (first in 1974)
- Best result: 16th (1974)

The Portugal men's national field hockey team represents Portugal in men's international field hockey and is controlled by the Portuguese Hockey Federation, the governing body for field hockey in Portugal.

== Competitive record ==
=== European Championships ===
EuroHockey Championship record
Year	Round	Position	Pld	W	D *	L	GF	GA
(Belgium) 1970	Did not participate							
(Spain) 1974	Fifteenth place game	16th	6	0	0	6	1	21
(West Germany) 1978 until (Germany) 2025	Did not qualify							
Total	1/18	16th	6	0	0	6	1	21

EuroHockey Championships record
Year	Level	Position	Pld	W	D*	L	GF	GA	P/R
(Ukraine) 2005	III	2nd	5	4	0	1	20	5	▲
(Portugal) 2007	II	7th	5	1	1	3	6	19	▼
(Croatia) 2009	III	3rd	4	2	1	1	8	11	Same position
(Italy) 2011	III	6th	4	1	1	2	15	10	Same position
(Switzerland) 2013	III	4th	5	2	0	3	17	14	Same position
(Portugal) 2015	III	2nd	4	1	1	2	12	10	▲
(Scotland) 2017	II	8th	5	1	0	4	8	25	▼
(Gibraltar) 2019	III	4th	5	2	0	3	18	20	Same position
(Portugal) 2021	III	4th	5	1	1	3	11	10	▲
(Republic of Ireland) 2023	II	7th	5	1	0	4	15	22	Same position
(Portugal) 2025	II	8th	6	0	0	6	9	24	Same position
Total	Highest: II		53	16	5	32	139	170	–

=== Hockey World League and FIH Series ===
Hockey World League & FIH Series record
Season	Position	Round	Pld	W	D *	L	GF	GA
2012–13	33rd of 33	Round 1	4	2	1	1	13	13
2012–13	33rd of 33	Round 2	5	0	0	5	2	47
2014–15	Unranked	Round 1	2	0	1	1	3	6
2016–17	Unranked	Round 1	4	1	0	3	7	20
2018–19	—N/a	Open	5	1	1	3	9	23
Total	33rd	2nd Round	20	4	3	13	34	109

== Results and fixtures ==
The following is a list of match results in the last 12 months, as well as any future matches that have been scheduled.

Win Draw Loss Fixture

=== 2026 ===
9 July 2026 EU Championship Qualifiers QF	Czech Republic	3–3 (2–3 p)	Portugal	Rome, Italy
16:15	Lupač 23'; Plachý 28'; Homolka 43'	Report	Rodrigues 2', 33'; Ventosa 49'
	Penalties
	Homolka (penalty shoot-out scored); J. Toms (penalty shoot-out scored); Plochý (penalty shoot-out missed); F. Toms (penalty shoot-out missed); Klaban (penalty shoot-out missed)		(penalty shoot-out missed) Rodrigues; (penalty shoot-out scored) Castro; (penalty shoot-out scored) Gomes; (penalty shoot-out scored) Franco

10 July 2026 EU Championship Qualifiers SF	Portugal	2–5	Italy	Rome, Italy
18:30	Castro 46'; Ventosa 51'	Report	Frascino 14'; Giuliani 23'; Brocco 43'; Puglisi 53'; Gencarelli 58'

12 July 2026 EU Championship Qualifiers 3/4 Classification	Croatia	3–2	Portugal	Rome, Italy
13:45	Krleža 15+', 39', 47'	Report	Gomes 3'; Rodrigues 48'

== See also ==
- Portugal women's national field hockey team
