= Ukraine men's national field hockey team =

Ukraine
- Association: Ukrainian Field Hockey Federation
- Confederation: EHF (Europe)
- Head Coach: Pavlo Mazur
- Assistant coach(es): Artem Popovchenko
- Manager: Mykola Kasianchuk
- Captain: Oleksandr Diachenko
Home	Away

FIH ranking
- Current: 29 (18 June 2026)
- Highest: 24 (2014 – July 2015, January 2017)
- Lowest: 48 (2003 – 2004)

The Ukrainian men's national field hockey team represents Ukraine in international field hockey competitions.

== Tournament history ==
Ukraine has never participated in or qualified for the World Cup, the Summer Olympics and the EuroHockey Nations Championship.

=== European championships ===
==== EuroHockey Championship II ====
EuroHockey Championship II record
Year	Host	Position	Pld	W	D	L	GF	GA
2005	Rome, Italy	played in the Championship III						
2007	Lisbon, Portugal	8th	5	0	2	3	7	10
2009	Wrexham, Wales	played in the Championship III						
2011	Vinnytsia, Ukraine	5th	5	3	0	2	13	10
2013	Vienna, Austria	5th	5	1	2	2	11	14
2015	Prague, Czech Republic	6th	5	2	0	3	19	22
2017	Glasgow, Scotland	5th	5	2	1	2	15	12
2019	Cambrai, France	6th	5	2	0	3	13	13
2021	Gniezno, Poland	6th	5	2	1	2	15	11
2023	(Republic of Ireland) Dublin, Ireland	2nd	5	2	1	2	16	19
2025	Lousada, Portugal	withdrew						
Total		2nd place	40	14	7	19	109	111

==== EuroHockey Championship III ====
- 2005 – (gold)
- 2009 – (gold)
- 2025 – (gold)

=== Hockey World League ===
- 2012–13 – 21st place
- 2014–15 – 24th place
- 2016–17 – 35th place

=== FIH Hockey Series ===
- 2018–19 – Second round

== Results and fixtures ==
The following is a list of match results in the last 12 months, as well as any future matches that have been scheduled.

Win Draw Loss Fixture

=== 2026 ===
9 July 2026 EU Championship Qualifiers QF	Italy	6–2	Ukraine	Rome, Italy
18:30	Frascino 5', 45'; Harte 20'; Arosio 28'; Puglisi 55'; Giuliani 56'	Report	Koshelenko 2', 34'

11 July 2026 EU Championship Qualifiers 5/8 Classification	Czech Republic	7–2	Ukraine	Rome, Italy
12:15	Plochý 18', 35', 38', 42'; J. Toms 23'; Homolka 41'; Lalík 56'	Report	Shevchuk 24'; Onofriiuk 32'

12 July 2026 EU Championship Qualifiers 7/8 Classification	Turkey	3–3 (4–2 p)	Ukraine	Rome, Italy
09:15	Kalkan 24'; Ekinci 27'; Karakuş 39'	Report	Koshelenko 6'; Riabchuk 38'; Solomianyi 58'
	Penalties
	Keleş (penalty shoot-out missed); Aydin (penalty shoot-out scored); Ataş (penalty shoot-out scored); Ekinci (penalty shoot-out scored); Elagöz (penalty shoot-out scored)		(penalty shoot-out missed) Onofriiuk; (penalty shoot-out missed) Solomianyi; (penalty shoot-out scored) Kaplinskyi; (penalty shoot-out scored) Shevchuk

== See also ==
- Ukraine women's national field hockey team
