= Switzerland men's national field hockey team =

Switzerland
- Association: Swiss Hockey Federation
- Confederation: EHF (Europe)
- Head Coach: Jair Levie
- Manager: Ramona Schwager
- Captain: Loris Grandchamp

FIH ranking
- Current: 39 ▼1 (18 June 2026)
- Highest: 28 (2008, April 2017 – December 2017)
- Lowest: 43 (2013)

Olympic Games
- Appearances: 5 (first in 1928)
- Best result: 5th (1936, 1948)

EuroHockey Championship
- Appearances: 6 (first in 1970)
- Best result: 8th (1970)

The Switzerland men's national field hockey team represents Switzerland in men's international field hockey competitions.

== Tournament record ==
=== Summer Olympics ===
- 1928 – 7th place
- 1936 – 5th place
- 1948 – 5th place
- 1952 – 9th place
- 1960 – 15th place

=== EuroHockey Championship ===
- 1970 – 8th place
- 1974 – 17th place
- 1991 – 11th place
- 1995 – 11th place
- 1999 – 10th place
- 2003 – 11th place

=== EuroHockey Championship II ===
- 2005 – 6th place
- 2007 – 4th place
- 2009 – 8th place
- 2015 – 7th place
- 2017 – 7th place
- 2021 – 7th place
- 2023 – 6th place

=== EuroHockey Championship III ===
- 2011 – 4th place
- 2013 – (gold)
- 2019 – (silver)

=== Hockey World League ===
- 2014–15 – 25th place
- 2016–17 – 30th place

=== FIH Hockey Series ===
- 2018–19 – First round

== Results and fixtures ==
The following is a list of match results in the last 12 months, as well as any future matches that have been scheduled.

Win Draw Loss Fixture

=== 2026 ===
Test series

| 27 June 2026 Game 1 | Switzerland | 3–3 | Italy | Luzern, Switzerland |
| 11:30 | Grandchamp 12', 42', 51' | Report | Arosio 4'; Frascino 24', 41' |

| 28 June 2026 Game 2 | Switzerland | 0–5 | Italy | Luzern, Switzerland |
| 11:30 | | Report | Puglisi 7'; Arosio 20'; Giuliani 30'; Dionisi Vici 53'; Brocco 57' |

2027 EuroHockey Championship Qualifiers

| 9 July 2026 QF | Switzerland | 2–3 | Croatia | Rome, Italy |
| 10:00 | Flück 18'; Conrad 52' | Report | Perković 11'; Krleža 27', 41' |

| 11 July 2026 5/8 Classification | Turkey | 0–7 | Switzerland | Rome, Italy |
| 10:00 | | Report | Mohrhauer 7'; Kraxner 25'; Gloor 26'; Grandchamp 41'; Gassner 46'; Flück 48'; Thijs 53' |

| 12 July 2026 5/6 Classification | Switzerland | 2–2 (4–3 p) | Czech Republic | Rome, Italy |
| 11:30 | Hengartner 8'; Grandchamp 43' | Report | Lupač 28'; F. Toms 42' |
| | Penalties |
| | Grandchamp (penalty shoot-out scored); Flück (penalty shoot-out scored); Fischbach (penalty shoot-out missed); Kraxner (penalty shoot-out scored); Conrad (penalty shoot-out missed); Grandchamp (penalty shoot-out missed); Flück (penalty shoot-out scored) | | (penalty shoot-out scored) Homolka; (penalty shoot-out missed) J. Toms; (penalty shoot-out missed) Šmíd; (penalty shoot-out scored) Klaban; (penalty shoot-out scored) Hes; (penalty shoot-out missed) Homolka; (penalty shoot-out missed) Klaban |

== See also ==
- Switzerland men's national under-21 field hockey team
- Switzerland women's national field hockey team
