= EuroHockey Championship IV =

European national field hockey competition

- Most recent season or competition: 2021 Men's EuroHockey Championship IV
- Formerly: EuroHockey Nations Challenge II
- Sport: Field hockey
- Founded: 2005; 21 years ago
- First season: 2005
- No. of teams: 6
- Confederation: EHF (Europe)
- Most recent champion: Hungary (1st title) (2019)
- Most titles: Gibraltar (2 titles)
- Level on pyramid: 4

The EuroHockey Championship IV, formerly known as the EuroHockey Nations Challenge II, is a competition for European national field hockey teams. It is the fourth level of the European field hockey Championships for national teams.

For men's national teams this is the lowest tier. There is promotion and relegation. The one or two first ranked teams qualify for the next Men's EuroHockey Championship III and are replaced by the one or two lowest-ranked teams from that tournament.

The tournament has been won by seven different teams: Gibraltar has the most titles with two and Denmark, Greece, Hungary, Slovakia, Slovenia and Turkey have all won the tournament once. The most recent edition was held in Helsinki, Finland and was won by Hungary. The next edition was supposed to be held in Kordin, Malta in August 2021 but was cancelled due to the travel restrictions related to the COVID-19 pandemic.

== Results ==
Year	Host	Final			Third place game		
Year	Host	Winner	Score	Runner-up	Third place	Score	Fourth place
2005; Details	Kordin, Malta	Denmark	3–0	Azerbaijan	Malta	2–1	Cyprus
2007; Details	Predanovci, Slovenia	Slovenia	5–0	Turkey	Serbia	6–1	Lithuania
2009; Details	Bratislava, Slovakia	Gibraltar	Round-robin	Slovakia	Bulgaria	Round-robin	Greece
2011; Details	Athens, Greece	Turkey	Round-robin	Greece	Bulgaria	Round-robin	Cyprus
2013; Details	Athens, Greece	Greece	Round-robin	Bulgaria	Cyprus	Only three teams	
2015; Details	Vilnius, Lithuania	Slovakia	3–1	Denmark	Lithuania	4–1	Malta
2017; Details	Lipovci, Slovenia	Gibraltar	Round-robin	Slovenia	Hungary	Round-robin	Cyprus
2019; Details	Helsinki, Finland	Hungary	Round-robin	Finland	Norway	Round-robin	Cyprus
2021; Details	Kordin, Malta	Cancelled due to the COVID-19 pandemic.			Cancelled		

=== Summary ===
Team	Winners	Runners-up	Third place	Fourth place
Gibraltar	2 (2009, 2017)			
Greece	1 (2013*)	1 (2011*)		1 (2009)
Denmark	1 (2005)	1 (2015)		
Slovakia	1 (2015)	1 (2009*)		
Slovenia	1 (2007*)	1 (2017*)		
Turkey	1 (2011)	1 (2007)		
Hungary	1 (2019)		1 (2017)	
Bulgaria		1 (2013)	2 (2009, 2011)	
Azerbaijan		1 (2005)		
Finland		1 (2019*)		
Cyprus			1 (2013)	4 (2005, 2011, 2017, 2019)
Lithuania			1 (2015*)	1 (2007)
Malta			1 (2005*)	1 (2015)
Norway			1 (2019)	
Serbia			1 (2007)	

* = host nation

=== Team appearances ===
Team	(Malta) 2005	(Slovenia) 2007	(Slovakia) 2009	(Greece) 2011	(Greece) 2013	(Lithuania) 2015	(Slovenia) 2017	(Finland) 2019	Total
Azerbaijan	2nd	–	–	–	–	–	–	–	1
Bulgaria	–	6th	3rd	3rd	2nd	–	–	–	4
Cyprus	4th	–	–	4th	3rd	7th	4th	4th	6
Denmark	1st	–	–	–	–	2nd	–	–	2
Finland	–	7th	–	–	–	6th	5th	2nd	2
Georgia	–	–	–	5th	–	–	–	–	1
Gibraltar	–	–	1st	–	–	–	1st	–	2
Greece	–	–	4th	2nd	1st	–	–	–	3
Hungary	–	–	–	—	–	5th	3rd	1st	3
Lithuania	–	4th	–	–	–	3rd	–	–	2
Malta	3rd	–	–	–	–	4th	–	–	2
Norway	–	–	–	—	–	8th	–	3rd	2
Serbia	–	3rd	–	–	–	–	–	–	1
Slovakia	–	5th	2nd	–	–	1st	–	–	3
Slovenia	–	1st	–	–	–	–	2nd	5th	3
Turkey	–	2nd	–	1st	–	–	–	–	2
Total	4	7	4	5	3	8	5	5	

== See also ==
- Men's EuroHockey Championship III
