= 2019 Men's EuroHockey Championship IV =

Field hockey tournament

Tournament details
- Host country: Finland
- City: Helsinki
- Dates: 6–11 August
- Teams: 5 (from 1 confederation)
- Venue: Helsinki Velodrome

Final positions
- Champions: Hungary (1st title)
- Runner-up: Finland
- Third place: Norway

Tournament statistics
- Matches played: 10
- Goals scored: 28 (2.8 per match)
- Top scorer: (Finland) Sami Laiho (4 goals)

The 2019 Men's EuroHockey Championship IV was the 8th edition of the EuroHockey Championship IV, the fourth level of the European field hockey championships organized by the European Hockey Federation. It was held from 7 to 11 August 2019 in Helsinki, Finland.

Hungary won their first EuroHockey Championship IV title and was promoted the EuroHockey Championship III.

== Teams ==
The following five teams, shown with pre-tournament world rankings, competed in this tournament.

- Cyprus (58)
- Hungary (64)
- Finland (70)
- Slovenia (72)
- Norway (81)

== Results ==
All times are local, EEST (UTC+3).

=== Pool ===
| Pos | Team | Pld | W | D | L | GF | GA | GD | Pts | Promotion |
|---|---|---|---|---|---|---|---|---|---|---|
| 1 | Hungary | 4 | 3 | 1 | 0 | 9 | 4 | +5 | 10 | EuroHockey Championship III |
| 2 | Finland (H) | 4 | 2 | 1 | 1 | 7 | 6 | +1 | 7 | |
| 3 | Norway | 4 | 1 | 2 | 1 | 5 | 5 | 0 | 5 | |
| 4 | Cyprus | 4 | 0 | 3 | 1 | 3 | 5 | −2 | 3 | |
| 5 | Slovenia | 4 | 0 | 1 | 3 | 4 | 8 | −4 | 1 | |

Source: FIH
Rules for classification: 1) points; 2) matches won; 3) goal difference; 4) goals for; 5) head-to-head result; 6) field goals for.
(H) Hosts

=== Matches ===
6 August 2019
15:45

| Hungary | 2–1 | Norway |
|---|---|---|
| Suba 50'; Olasz 52' | Report | Rathore 8' |

Umpires:
Mikhail Golovanov (RUS)
Pieter Hembrecht (NED)

6 August 2019
18:00

| Finland | 3–1 | Slovenia |
|---|---|---|
| Laiho 41', 44'; Makela 55' | Report | Maučec 53' |

Umpires:
Tamás Hermann (HUN)
Wajed Khan (NOR)

7 August 2019
15:45

| Cyprus | 1–1 | Norway |
|---|---|---|
| Weare 60' | Report | Garcha 27' |

Umpires:
Pieter Hembrecht (NED)
Sašo Sukič (SLO)

7 August 2019
18:00

| Hungary | 3–2 | Slovenia |
|---|---|---|
| Léber 30', 42'; Ficzere 56' | Report | Maučec 38'; Potokar 56' |

Umpires:
Christian Gibson (FIN)
Mikhail Golovanov (RUS)

8 August 2019
18:00

| Finland | 3–1 | Cyprus |
|---|---|---|
| Laiho 13'; Meski 20'; Vesakoski 43' | Report | Weare 50' |

Umpires:
Tamás Hermann (HUN)
Wajed Khan (NOR)

9 August 2019
12:00

| Slovenia | 1–2 | Norway |
|---|---|---|
| Blaž 51' | Report | Garcha 58', 60' |

Umpires:
Mikhail Golovanov (RUS)
Christian Gibson (FIN)

10 August 2019
12:45

| Hungary | 1–1 | Cyprus |
|---|---|---|
| Ficzere 23' | Report | Stylianou 6' |

Umpires:
Pieter Hembrecht (NED)
Christian Gibson (FIN)

10 August 2019
15:00

| Norway | 1–1 | Finland |
|---|---|---|
| Zia 51' | Report | Laiho 38' |

Umpires:
Sašo Sukič (SLO)
Tamás Hermann (HUN)

11 August 2019
11:45

| Cyprus | 0–0 | Slovenia |
|---|---|---|
| | Report |

Umpires:
Mikhai Golovanov (RUS)
Wajed Khan (NOR)

11 August 2019
15:00

| Finland | 0–3 | Hungary |
|---|---|---|
| | Report | Botka 15'; I. Farkas 26'; Olasz 39' |

Umpires:
Pieter Hembrecht (NED)
Saso Sukic (SLO)

== Statistics ==
=== Final standings ===
| Rank | Team |
|---|---|
| 1st place, gold medalist(s) | Hungary |
| 2nd place, silver medalist(s) | Finland |
| 3rd place, bronze medalist(s) | Norway |
| 4 | Cyprus |
| 5 | Slovenia |

Promoted to the EuroHockey Championship III

=== Goalscorers ===
There were 28 goals scored in 10 matches, for an average of 2.8 goals per match.

4 goals

- (Finland) Sami Laiho

3 goals

- (Norway) Arunpreet Singh Garcha

2 goals

- (Cyprus) Nicholas James Weare
- (Hungary) Zsombor Ficzere
- (Hungary) Sebastian Léber
- (Hungary) Balázs Olasz
- (Slovenia) Franc Maučec

1 goal

- (Cyprus) Constantinos Stylianou
- (Finland) Simo Makela
- (Finland) Tony Meski
- (Finland) Olli Vesakoski
- (Hungary) Levente Botka
- (Hungary) Imre Farkas
- (Hungary) Tamás Suba
- (Norway) Zarq Rathore
- (Norway) Usama Zia
- (Slovenia) Legen Blaž
- (Slovenia) Nejc Potokar

Source: FIH

== See also ==
- 2019 Men's EuroHockey Championship III
