= 2021 Men's EuroHockey Championship IV =

Cancelled field hockey tournament

Tournament details
- Host country: Malta
- City: Kordin
- Dates: Cancelled
- Teams: 7 (from 1 confederation)
- Venue: National Hockey Centre

The 2021 Men's EuroHockey Championship IV was supposed to be the ninth edition of the EuroHockey Championship IV, the fourth level of the men's European field hockey championships organized by the European Hockey Federation. It was scheduled to be held from 1 to 7 August 2021 in Kordin, Paola, Malta. After four teams withdrew from the tournament due to the travel restrictions related to the COVID-19 pandemic the tournament was officially cancelled on 31 May 2021.

== Qualified teams ==
Participating nations have qualified based on their final ranking from the 2019 competition.

Dates	Event	Location	Quotas	Qualifier(s)
28 July – 3 August 2019	2019 EuroHockey Championship III	Gibraltar	1	Malta (64)
6–11 August 2019	2019 EuroHockey Championship IV	Helsinki, Finland	4	Cyprus (58); ~~Finland (69)~~ (Note: Finland, Norway, Slovenia and Sweden withdrew.); ~~Norway (74)~~; ~~Slovenia~~
12 May 2020	New entry	—N/a	2	Denmark (–); ~~Sweden (–)~~
Total			7	

== See also ==
- 2021 Men's EuroHockey Championship III
