= 2021 Men's EuroHockey Championship III =

Field hockey tournament

Tournament details
- Host country: Portugal
- City: Lousada
- Dates: 1–7 August
- Teams: 7 (from 1 confederation)
- Venue: AD Lousada

Final positions
- Champions: Belarus (2nd title)
- Runner-up: Czech Republic
- Third place: Turkey

Tournament statistics
- Matches played: 15
- Goals scored: 67 (4.47 per match)
- Top scorer(s): (Czech Republic) Tomas Procházka (Czech Republic) Jan Železný (5 goals)
- Best player: (Czech Republic) Tomas Procházka

The 2021 Men's EuroHockey Championship III was the ninth edition of the Men's EuroHockey Championship III, the third level of the men's European field hockey championships organized by the European Hockey Federation. It was held from 1 to 7 August 2021 at AD Lousada in Lousada, Portugal.

Belarus won their second EuroHockey Championship III title by defeating the Czech Republic 4–0 in the final. Turkey won their first-ever EuroHockey Championship III medal by defeating the hosts Portugal 4–3 in a shoot-out after a 3–3 draw in regular time.

== Qualified teams ==
Participating nations have qualified based on their final ranking from the 2019 competition.

Dates	Event	Location	Quotas	Qualifier(s)
28 July – 3 August 2019	2019 EuroHockey Championship II	Cambrai, France	2	Belarus (33); Czech Republic (32)
28 July – 3 August 2019	2019 EuroHockey Championship III	Gibraltar	5	~~Gibraltar~~ (Note: Hungary and Gibraltar withdrew and were replaced by Malta.); Lithuania (51); Malta; Portugal (41); Turkey (47); Slovakia (50)
6–11 August 2019	2019 EuroHockey Championship IV	Helsinki, Finland	0	~~Hungary~~
Total			7	

== Umpires ==
The following eight umpires were appointed for the tournament by the EHF:

- Mark Becholz (NED)
- Maarten Boxma (NED)
- Ricardo Fernandes (POR)
- Nathan Galea (MLT)
- Marcel Knakowski (GER)
- Yauheni Protska (BLR)
- Jaroslav Suchocki (LTU)
- Mahmut Çilkiz (TUR)

== Preliminary round ==
=== Pool A ===
Pos	Team	Pld	W	D	L	GF	GA	GD	Pts	Qualification
1	Belarus	2	1	1	0	11	2	+9	4	Semi-finals
2	Turkey	2	1	1	0	5	2	+3	4	Semi-finals
3	Malta	2	0	0	2	0	12	−12	0	

Source: FIH
Rules for classification: 1) points; 2) matches won; 3) goal difference; 4) goals for; 5) head-to-head result; 6) field goals for.

1 August 2021
13:30

Belarus	2–2	Turkey
Kadran 28'; Belavusau 56'	Report	A. A. Özkiliç 43', 49'

Umpires:
Maarten Boxma (NED)
Jaroslav Suchocki (LTU)

2 August 2021
16:45

Turkey	3–0	Malta
Demirel 7'; Kilinc 18', 36'	Report

Umpires:
Ricardo Fernandes (POR)
Yauheni Protska (BLR)

4 August 2021
12:15

Belarus	9–0	Malta
Belavusau 3'; Bandarchuk 7'; Hancharou 15'; Tsaluika 19', 21', 45'; Paulovich 27'; Khatyliou 41'; Haurylau 58'	Report

Umpires:
Marcel Knakowski (GER)
Ricardo Fernandes (POR)

=== Pool B ===
Pos	Team	Pld	W	D	L	GF	GA	GD	Pts	Qualification
1	Czech Republic	3	3	0	0	15	1	+14	9	Semi-finals
2	Portugal (H)	3	1	1	1	6	4	+2	4	Semi-finals
3	Lithuania	3	1	0	2	2	10	−8	3	
4	Slovakia	3	0	1	2	3	11	−8	1	

Source: FIH
Rules for classification: 1) points; 2) matches won; 3) goal difference; 4) goals for; 5) head-to-head result; 6) field goals for.
(H) Hosts

1 August 2021
15:45

Czech Republic	7–0	Slovakia
Capouch 3'; Procházka 38'; Plochý 50', 60', 60', 60+'; Bárta 51'	Report

Umpires:
Mark Becholz (NED)
Mahmut Çilkiz (TUR)

1 August 2021
18:00

Portugal	3–0	Lithuania
Santos 36'; Ventosa 45'; Caramalho 51'	Report

Umpires:
Marcel Knakowski (GER)
Nathan Galea (MLT)

3 August 2021
16:45

Slovakia	1–2	Lithuania
T. Romanec 12'	Report	Bandziulis 7'; Balsiukas 40'

Umpires:
Marcel Knakowski (GER)
Yauheni Protska (BLR)

3 August 2021
19:00

Portugal	1–2	Czech Republic
Caramalho 9'	Report	Železný 4'; Procházka 36'

Umpires:
Maarten Boxma (NED)
Nathan Galea (MLT)

4 August 2021
16:45

Czech Republic	6–0	Lithuania
Železný 15', 21'; Klaban 27'; Procházka 36', 55'; Uhlíř 53'	Report

Umpires:
Maarten Boxma (NED)
Mark Becholz (NED)

4 August 2021
19:00

Slovakia	2–2	Portugal
Hruska 6'; Jelačič 57'	Report	Castro 7'; Santos 39'

Umpires:
Jaroslav Suchocki (LTU)
Mahmut Çilkiz (TUR)

== Fifth to seventh place classification ==
=== Pool C ===
The points obtained in the preliminary round against the other team are taken over.

Pos	Team	Pld	W	D	L	GF	GA	GD	Pts
5	Slovakia	2	1	0	1	4	3	+1	3
6	Lithuania	2	1	0	1	2	2	0	3
7	Malta	2	1	0	1	2	3	−1	3

Source: FIH
Rules for classification: 1) points; 2) matches won; 3) goal difference; 4) goals for; 5) head-to-head result; 6) field goals for.

6 August 2021
11:30

Malta	1–0	Lithuania
K. Bajada 50'	Report

Umpires:
Yauheni Protska (BLR)
Mahmut Çilkiz (TUR)

7 August 2021
10:15

Malta	1–3	Slovakia
T. Degiovanni 57'	Report	Štrofek 12'; Petráš 35', 51'

Umpires:
Ricardo Fernandes (POR)
Mahmut Çilkiz (TUR)

== First to fourth place classification ==
=== Bracket ===
Semi-finals
6 August
Belarus	3
Portugal	2
6 August
Czech Republic	3
Turkey	2

Final
7 August
Belarus	4
Czech Republic	0
Third place
7 August
Portugal	3 (3)
Turkey (s.o.)	3 (4)

=== Semi-finals ===
6 August 2021
13:45

Czech Republic	3–2	Turkey
Železný 33', 39'; Procházka 53'	Report	A. A. Özkilic 21', 46'

Umpires:
Ricardo Fernandes (POR)
Nathan Galea (MLT)

6 August 2021
16:00

Belarus	3–2	Portugal
Hancharou 37'; Belavusau 43'; Tsaluika 54'	Report	Caramalho 34'; Wenzel 57'

Umpires:
Jaroslav Suchocki (LTU)
Mark Becholz (NED)

=== Third place game ===
7 August 2021
12:45

Portugal	3–3	Turkey
Franco 3'; Tavares 38'; Caramalho 54'	Report	Erman 23', 44', 51'
Penalties
Tavares (penalty shoot-out scored); Santos (penalty shoot-out scored); Ventosa (penalty shoot-out missed); Caramalho (penalty shoot-out missed); Franco (penalty shoot-out scored)	3–4	(penalty shoot-out scored) Ataş; (penalty shoot-out scored) Ekinci; (penalty shoot-out missed) Ekinci; (penalty shoot-out scored) Kilinc; (penalty shoot-out scored) Aydin

Umpires:
Maarten Boxma (NED)
Marcel Knakowski (GER)

=== Final ===
7 August 2021
15:00

Belarus	4–0	Czech Republic
Belavusau 3'; Hancharou 18'; Kochkin 27'; P. Korsik 41'	Report

Umpires:
Jaroslav Suchocki (LTU)
Mark Becholz (NED)

== Statistics ==
=== Final standings ===
1. Belarus
2. Czech Republic
3. Turkey
4. Portugal
5. Slovakia
6. Lithuania
7. Malta

=== Awards ===
The following awards were given at the conclusion of the tournament.

Best player	Best goalkeeper	Top goalscorers
(Czech Republic) Tomas Procházka	(Slovakia) Jakub Bogár	(Czech Republic) Tomas Procházka (Czech Republic) Jan Železný

=== Goalscorers ===
There were 67 goals scored in 15 matches, for an average of 4.47 goals per match.

5 goals

- (Czech Republic) Tomas Procházka
- (Czech Republic) Jan Železný

4 goals

- (Belarus) Uladzislau Belavusau
- (Belarus) Dzianis Tsaluika
- (Czech Republic) Lukas Plochý
- (Portugal) Afonso Caramalho
- (Turkey) Ali Akin Özkiliç

3 goals

- (Belarus) Aliaksandr Hancharou
- (Turkey) Batuhan Erman

2 goals

- (Portugal) José Santos
- (Slovakia) Daniel Petráš
- (Turkey) Vakif Kilinc

1 goal

- (Belarus) Vadzim Bandarchuk
- (Belarus) Yauheni Haurylau
- (Belarus) Artur Kadran
- (Belarus) Dzianis Khatyliou
- (Belarus) Uladzislau Kochkin
- (Belarus) Pavel Korsik
- (Belarus) Mikhail Paulovich
- (Czech Republic) Michal Bárta
- (Czech Republic) Martin Capouch
- (Czech Republic) Štêpán Klaban
- (Czech Republic) Adam Uhlíř
- (Lithuania) Zygimantas Balsiukas
- (Lithuania) Julius Bandziulis
- (Malta) Keith Bajada
- (Malta) Tom Degiovanni
- (Portugal) Rodrigo Castro
- (Portugal) David Franco
- (Portugal) Luis Tavares
- (Portugal) Tiago Ventosa
- (Portugal) Philipp Wenzel
- (Slovakia) Matej Hruska
- (Slovakia) Matej Jelačič
- (Slovakia) Tomáš Romanec
- (Slovakia) Adam Štrofek
- (Turkey) Mehmet Demirel

Source: FIH

== See also ==
- 2021 Men's EuroHockey Championship II
- 2021 Men's EuroHockey Championship IV
- 2021 Women's EuroHockey Championship III
