= 2005 Men's EuroHockey Nations Challenge II =

Field hockey tournament

Tournament details
- Host country: Malta
- City: Paola
- Dates: 5–10 September
- Teams: 4 (from 1 confederation)

Final positions
- Champions: Denmark (1st title)
- Runner-up: Azerbaijan
- Third place: Malta

Tournament statistics
- Matches played: 10
- Goals scored: 47 (4.7 per match)

The 2005 Men's EuroHockey Nations Challenge II was the first edition of the EuroHockey Nations Challenge II, the fourth level of the men's European field hockey championships organized by the European Hockey Federation. It was held from 5 to 10 September 2005 in Kordin, Paola, Malta.

Denmark won the first edition of the EuroHockey Nations Challenge II and were promoted to the EuroHockey Nations Challenge I together with Azerbaijan.

== Results ==
All times are local, CEST (UTC+1).

=== Preliminary round ===
Pos	Team	Pld	W	D	L	GF	GA	GD	Pts	Qualification
1	Azerbaijan	3	3	0	0	9	1	+8	9	Semi-finals
2	Denmark	3	2	0	1	14	4	+10	6	Semi-finals
3	Malta (H)	3	1	0	2	7	8	−1	3	Semi-finals
4	Cyprus	3	0	0	3	1	18	−17	0	Semi-finals

Source: TheSports.org
(H) Hosts

5 September 2005
15:00

Denmark	1–2	Azerbaijan

5 September 2005
17:30

Malta	5–1	Cyprus

6 September 2005
15:00

Cyprus	0–9	Denmark

6 September 2005
17:30

Azerbaijan	3–0	Malta

7 September 2005
15:00

Azerbaijan	4–0	Cyprus

7 September 2005
17:30

Malta	2–4	Denmark

=== First to fourth place classification ===
Semi-finals
9 September
Azerbaijan	3
Cyprus	1
9 September
Denmark	2
Malta	1

Final
10 September
Azerbaijan	0
Denmark	3
Third place
10 September
Malta	2
Cyprus	1

==== Semi-finals ====
9 September 2005
13:00

Azerbaijan	3–1	Cyprus

9 September 2005
15:30

Denmark	2–1	Malta

==== Third place game ====
10 September 2005
13:00

Malta	2–1	Cyprus

==== Final ====
10 September 2005
15:30

Azerbaijan	0–3	Denmark

== Final standings ==
Rank	Team
1st place, gold medalist(s)	Denmark
2nd place, silver medalist(s)	Azerbaijan
3rd place, bronze medalist(s)	Malta
4	Cyprus

Promoted to the EuroHockey Nations Challenge I

== See also ==
- 2005 Men's EuroHockey Nations Challenge I
