= Bulgarian Olympic Committee =

National Olympic Committee

- Country: Bulgaria
- [[|]]
- Code: BUL
- Created: 1923
- Recognized: 1924
- Continental Association: EOC
- Headquarters: Sofia, Bulgaria
- President: Vesela Lecheva
- Secretary General: Belcho Goranov
- Website: www.bgolympic.org

The Bulgarian Olympic Committee (Bulgarian: Български олимпийски комитет, romanized: Balgarski olimpiyski komitet; abbreviated as БОК, BOC; IOC Code: BUL) is a non-profit organization serving as the National Olympic Committee of Bulgaria and a part of the International Olympic Committee.

== History ==
The Bulgarian Olympic committee was formed on 30 March 1923 (with Bulgaria participating in the Olympic Games since the first modern Olympiad in 1896) and disbanded between September 1944 and 1952, since when it has continuously represented the country in the Olympic movement.

== List of presidents ==
| President | Term |
|---|---|
| Eftim Kitanchev | 1923–1925 |
| Dimitar Stanchov | 1925–1929 |
| Velizar Lozanov | 1929–1941 |
| Rashko Atanasov | 1941–1944 |
| Vladimir Stoychev | 1959–1982 |
| Ivan Slavkov | 1982–2005 |
| Stefka Kostadinova | 2005–2025 |
| Vesela Lecheva | 2025–present |

== IOC Members ==
| President | Term |
|---|---|
| Dimitar Tsokov | 1906-1912 |
| Dimitar Stanchov | 1913-1929 |
| Stefan Chaprashikov | 1929-1944 |
| Vladimir Stoychev | 1952-1987 |

== Member federations ==
The Bulgarian National Federations are the organizations that coordinate all aspects of their individual sports. They are responsible for training, competition and development of their sports. There are currently 29 Olympic Summer and 7 Winter Sport Federations in Bulgaria.

| National Federation | Summer or Winter | Headquarters |
|---|---|---|
| Bulgarian Archery Federation | Summer | Sofia |
| Bulgarian Athletic Federation | Summer | Sofia |
| Bulgarian Badminton Federation | Summer | Sofia |
| Bulgarian Basketball Federation | Summer | Sofia |
| Bulgarian Biathlon Federation | Winter | Sofia |
| Bulgarian Bobsleigh and Skeleton Federation | Winter | Sofia |
| Bulgarian Boxing Federation | Summer | Sofia |
| Bulgarian Canoe Federation | Summer | Sofia |
| Bulgarian Curling Federation | Winter | Sofia |
| Bulgarian Cycling Association | Summer | Sofia |
| Bulgarian Equestrian Federation | Summer | Sofia |
| Bulgatian Fencing Federation | Summer | Sofia |
| Bulgarian Football Union | Summer | Sofia |
| Bulgarian Golf Association | Summer | Sofia |
| Bulgarian Handball Federation | Summer | Sofia |
| Bulgarian Hockey Federation | Summer | Sofia |
| Bulgarian Ice Hockey Federation | Winter | Sofia |
| Bulgarian Judo Federation | Summer | Sofia |
| Bulgarian Luge Federation | Winter | Sofia |
| Bulgarian Modern Pentathlon Federation | Summer | Sofia |
| Bulgarian Rowing Federation | Summer | Sofia |
| Bulgarian Rugby Federation | Summer | Sofia |
| Bulgarian Sailing Federation | Summer | Sofia |
| Bulgarian Shooting Union | Summer | Sofia |
| Bulgarian Skating Federation | Winter | Sofia |
| Bulgarian Ski Federation | Winter | Sofia |
| Bulgarian Swimming Federation | Summer | Sofia |
| Bulgarian Table Tennis Federation | Summer | Sofia |
| Bulgarian Taekwondo Federation | Summer | Sofia |
| Bulgarian Tennis Federation | Summer | Sofia |
| Bulgarian Trampoline Federation | Summer | Sofia |
| Bulgarian Triathlon Federation | Summer | Sofia |
| Bulgarian Volleyball Federation | Summer | Sofia |
| Bulgarian Water Polo Federation | Summer | Sofia |
| Bulgarian Weightlifting Federation | Summer | Sofia |
| Bulgarian Wrestling Federation | Summer | Sofia |

== See also ==
- Bulgaria at the Olympics
