= Lithuania national field hockey team =

Lithuania national field hockey team may refer to:

- Lithuania men's national field hockey team
- Lithuania women's national field hockey team
