= 1970 Men's EuroHockey Nations Championship =

Tournament details
- Host country: Belgium
- City: Brussels
- Dates: 18–27 September
- Teams: 19 (from 1 confederation)

Final positions
- Champions: West Germany (1st title)
- Runner-up: Netherlands
- Third place: Spain

Tournament statistics
- Matches played: 64
- Goals scored: 160 (2.5 per match)

The 1970 Men's EuroHockey Nations Championship was the inaugural edition of the Men's EuroHockey Nations Championship, the quadrennial international men's field hockey championship of Europe organized by the European Hockey Federation. It was held from 19 to 27 September 1970 in Brussels, Belgium.

West Germany won the first-ever European championship by defeating the Netherlands 3–1 in the final. Spain won the bronze medal by defeating France 2–1.

The top four teams qualified for the 1971 Men's Hockey World Cup.

== Preliminary round ==
=== Pool A ===
Pos	Team	Pld	W	D	L	GF	GA	GD	Pts	Qualification
1	West Germany	3	2	1	0	8	0	+8	5	Quarter-finals
2	Poland	3	1	2	0	2	1	+1	4	Quarter-finals
3	Wales	3	0	2	1	1	3	−2	2	
4	Italy	3	0	1	2	0	7	−7	1	

Source: TheSports.org

19 September 1970

West Germany	2–0	Wales

19 September 1970

Poland	1–0	Italy

20 September 1970

West Germany	0–0	Poland

20 September 1970

Wales	0–0	Italy

21 September 1970

West Germany	6–0	Italy

21 September 1970

Poland	1–1	Wales

=== Pool B ===
Pos	Team	Pld	W	D	L	GF	GA	GD	Pts	Qualification
1	Netherlands	4	3	1	0	8	2	+6	7	Quarter-finals
2	England	4	3	0	1	7	3	+4	6	Quarter-finals
3	Austria	4	1	1	2	3	5	−2	3	
4	Soviet Union	4	1	1	2	5	9	−4	3	
5	Denmark	4	0	1	3	0	4	−4	1	

Source: TheSports.org

18 September 1970

England	3–1	Soviet Union

18 September 1970

Netherlands	2–0	Austria

19 September 1970

Soviet Union	1–0	Denmark

19 September 1970

Netherlands	1–0	England

20 September 1970

Austria	1–0	Denmark

20 September 1970

Netherlands	5–2	Soviet Union

21 September 1970

Netherlands	0–0	Denmark

21 September 1970

England	2–1	Austria

22 September 1970

England	2–0	Denmark

22 September 1970

Soviet Union	1–1	Austria

=== Pool C ===
Pos	Team	Pld	W	D	L	GF	GA	GD	Pts	Qualification
1	France	4	3	1	0	10	1	+9	7	Quarter-finals
2	Spain	4	2	2	0	21	2	+19	6	Quarter-finals
3	Ireland	4	2	1	1	8	2	+6	5	
4	Czechoslovakia	4	1	0	3	1	9	−8	2	
5	Malta	4	0	0	4	0	26	−26	0	

Source: TheSports.org

18 September 1970

France	1–0	Czechoslovakia

18 September 1970

Spain	1–1	Ireland

19 September 1970

Spain	6–0	Czechoslovakia

19 September 1970

France	7–0	Malta

20 September 1970

France	1–1	Spain

20 September 1970

Ireland	5–0	Malta

21 September 1970

Ireland	2–0	Czechoslovakia

21 September 1970

Spain	13–0	Malta

22 September 1970

Czechoslovakia	1–0	Malta

22 September 1970

France	1–0	Ireland

=== Pool D ===
Pos	Team	Pld	W	D	L	GF	GA	GD	Pts	Qualification
1	Belgium (H)	4	4	0	0	12	0	+12	8	Quarter-finals
2	Switzerland	4	2	1	1	2	3	−1	5	Quarter-finals
3	Finland	4	2	1	1	2	1	+1	5	
4	Scotland	4	1	0	3	1	5	−4	2	
5	Hungary	4	0	0	4	0	8	−8	0	

Source: TheSports.org
(H) Hosts

18 September 1970

Belgium	1–0	Finland

18 September 1970

Switzerland	1–0	Scotland

19 September 1970

Switzerland	1–0	Hungary

19 September 1970

Belgium	3–0	Scotland

20 September 1970

Belgium	5–0	Hungary

20 September 1970

Finland	1–0	Scotland

21 September 1970

Scotland	1–0	Hungary

21 September 1970

Switzerland	0–0	Finland

22 September 1970

Finland	1–0	Hungary

22 September 1970

Belgium	3–0	Switzerland

Playoff

September 1970

Switzerland	1–0	Finland

== Classification round ==
=== 17th to 19th place classification ===
Pos	Team	Pld	W	D	L	GF	GA	GD	Pts
17	Hungary	2	2	0	0	3	0	+3	4
18	Denmark	2	1	0	1	10	1	+9	2
19	Malta	2	0	0	2	0	12	−12	0

Source: TheSports.org
Rules for classification: 1) points; 2) goal difference; 3) goals scored; 4) head-to-head result.

24 September 1970

Denmark	10–0	Malta

26 September 1970

Hungary	2–0	Malta

27 September 1970

Hungary	1–0	Denmark

=== Ninth to 16th place classification ===
9–16th place quarter-finals
24 September
Czechoslovakia	1
Finland	0
24 September
Austria	1
Italy	0
24 September
Ireland	1
Scotland	0
24 September
Wales (p.s.o.)	0 (5)
Soviet Union	0 (3)

9–12th place semi-finals
26 September
Czechoslovakia	3
Austria	0
26 September
Ireland	1
Wales	0

Ninth place
27 September
Ireland	1
Czechoslovakia	0
11th place
27 September
Austria	2
Wales	1

==== 13th to 16th place classification ====
13–16th place semi-finals
26 September
Finland	0
Italy	3
26 September
Scotland	0
Soviet Union	1

13th place
27 September
Italy	2
Soviet Union	0
15th place
27 September
Finland	1
Scotland	4

=== First to eighth place classification ===
Quarter-finals
24 September
West Germany (a.e.t.)	1
England	0
24 September
France	2
Switzerland	0
24 September
Netherlands	1
Poland	0
24 September
Spain	2
Belgium	1

Semi-finals
26 September
West Germany (a.e.t.)	2
France	1
26 September
Netherlands	2
Spain	0

Final
27 September
West Germany	3
Netherlands	1
Third place
27 September
France	1
Spain	2

==== Fifth to eighth place classification ====
5–8th place semi-finals
26 September
England	2
Switzerland	0
26 September
Poland	2
Belgium	4

Fifth place
27 September
England	1
Belgium	3
Seventh place
27 September
Switzerland	1
Poland	3

== Final standings ==
Rank	Team
Gold medal	West Germany
Silver medal	Netherlands
Bronze medal	Spain
4	France
5	Belgium
6	England
7	Poland
8	Switzerland
9	Ireland
10	Czechoslovakia
11	Austria
12	Wales
13	Italy
14	Soviet Union
15	Scotland
16	Finland
17	Hungary
18	Denmark
19	Malta

Qualified for the 1971 World Cup
