= Finland men's national field hockey team =

Finland
- Association: Finnish Hockey Association
- Confederation: EHF (Europe)
- Head Coach: Elliot Steedman; Attila Farkas
- Manager: Suvi Leinonen-Ondreka
- Captain: Sampo Hirvioja

FIH ranking
- Current: 47 ▲1 (18 June 2026)
- Highest: 53 (2003)
- Lowest: 76 (January 2017)

Olympic Games
- Appearances: 1 (first in 1952)
- Best result: 9th (1952)

EuroHockey Championship
- Appearances: 2 (first in 1970)
- Best result: 16th (1970)

The Finland men's national field hockey team (Finnish: Suomen miesten maahockeymaajoukkue) represents Finland in men's international field hockey and is controlled by the Finnish Hockey Association the governing body for field hockey in Finland.

== Competitive record ==
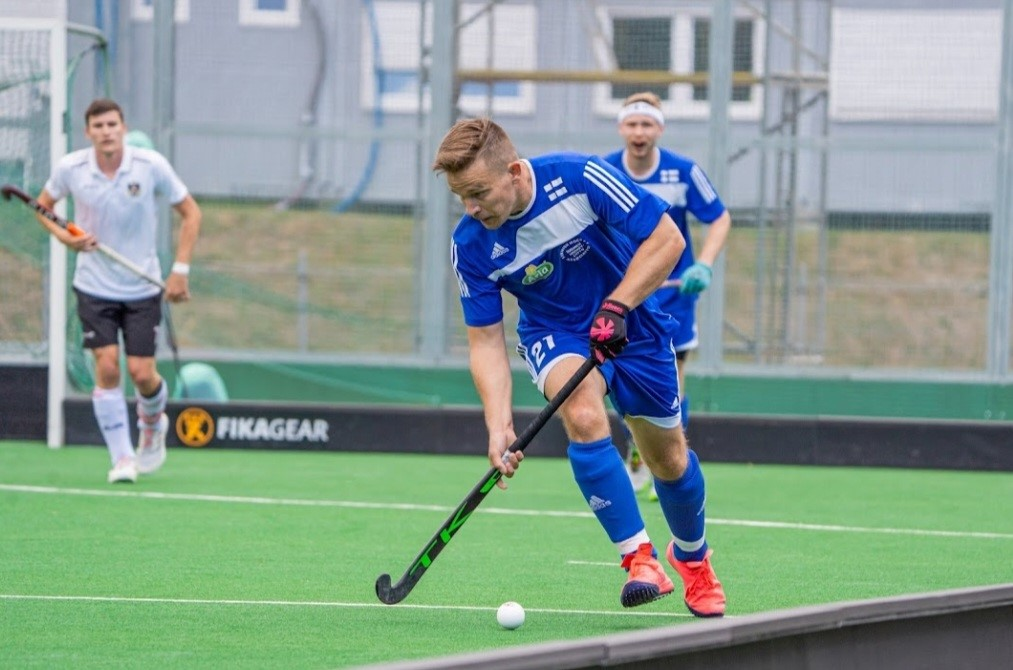
Finland against Austria in 2022

=== Summer Olympics ===
Summer Olympics record
Year	Round	Position	Pld	W	D	L	GF	GA	Squad
(United Kingdom) 1908 until (United Kingdom) 1948	Did not participate								
(Finland) 1952	Classification	9th	2	0	0	2	0	13	Squad
(Australia) 1956 until (South Korea) 1988	Did not participate								
(Spain) 1992 until (United States) 2028	Did not qualify								
Total	9th (1x)	1/24	2	0	0	2	0	13	–

=== European championships ===
EuroHockey Championship record
Year	Round	Position	Pld	W	D	L	GF	GA
(Belgium) 1970	15th place match	16th	8	2	1	5	3	10
(Spain) 1974	17th place match	18th	5	0	0	5	1	14
(West Germany) 1978	Did not qualify							
(Netherlands) 1983	Did not qualify							
(Soviet Union) 1987	Did not qualify							
(France) 1991	Did not qualify							
(Republic of Ireland) 1995	Did not qualify							
(Italy) 1999	Did not qualify							
(Spain) 2003	Did not qualify							
(Germany) 2005	Did not qualify							
(England) 2007	Did not qualify							
(Netherlands) 2009	Did not qualify							
(Germany) 2011	Did not qualify							
(Belgium) 2013	Did not qualify							
(England) 2015	Did not qualify							
(Netherlands) 2017	Did not qualify							
(Belgium) 2019	Did not qualify							
(Netherlands) 2021	Did not qualify							
(Germany) 2023	Did not qualify							
(Germany) 2025	Did not qualify							
(England) 2027	To be determined							
Total	Best: 16th	2/18	13	2	1	10	4	24

EuroHockey Championships record
Year	Level	Position	Pld	W	D	L	GF	GA	P/R
2005	Did not enter								
(Slovenia) 2007	IV	7th	4	0	0	4	1	17	Same position
2009	Did not enter								
2011	Did not enter								
2013	Did not enter								
(Lithuania) 2015	IV	6th	5	1	1	3	7	15	Same position
(Slovenia) 2017	IV	5th	4	0	0	4	6	20	Same position
(Finland) 2019	IV	2nd	4	2	1	1	7	6	Same position
(Malta) 2021	IV	Withdrew							
2023	Did not enter								
(Turkey) 2025	III	5th	6	2	2	2	8	13	
Total	Highest: IV		17	3	2	12	21	58	–

=== Friendship Games ===
- 1984 – 6th place

== Results and fixtures ==
The following is a list of match results in the last 12 months, as well as any future matches that have been scheduled.

Win Draw Loss Fixture

=== 2026 ===
==== Oslo Test series ====
13 June 2026 Test 1	Norway	1–1	Finland	Oslo, Norway
11:00	Zafar 14'	Report	Rihtilä 44'	Stadium: Mortensrud Landhockeybane

14 June 2026 Test 2	Norway	0–5	Finland	Oslo, Norway
09:30		Report	Rantala 16', 40'; Rihtilä 17', 18'; Karjalainen 42'	Stadium: Mortensrud Landhockeybane

==== EuroHockey Championship Qualifier II ====
9 July 2026 Pool B	Finland	0–3	Gibraltar	Helsinki, Finland
18:30		Report	Lopez 20'; Hernandez 22'; Dobinson 38'	Stadium: Velodromi Outdoor

10 July 2026 Pool B	Malta	1–3	Finland	Helsinki, Finland
18:30	Degiovanni 22'	Report	Rihtilä 43'; Laiho 47'; Määttänen 51'	Stadium: Velodromi Outdoor

11 July 2026 Pool B	Finland	2–2	Greece	Helsinki, Finland
18:15	Könönen 45', 59'	Report	Dierckx 25'; Welzel 43'	Stadium: Velodromi Outdoor

12 July 2026 Fifth place match	Hungary	0–2	Finland	Helsinki, Finland
13:15		Report	Rantala 38'; Könönen 47'	Stadium: Velodromi Outdoor

== See also ==
- Finland women's national field hockey team
