= Denmark men's national field hockey team =

Denmark
- Association: Danish Hockey Union
- Confederation: EHF (Europe)

FIH ranking
- Current: NR (18 June 2026)
- Highest: 48 (2007 – 2008)
- Lowest: 80 (January 2019)

Olympic Games
- Appearances: 5 (first in 1920)
- Best result: (silver) 2nd (1920)

EuroHockey Championship
- Appearances: 2 (first in 1970)
- Best result: 14th (1974)
Medal record
Olympic Games
Silver medal – second place	1920 Antwerp	Team

The Denmark men's national field hockey team represents Denmark in men's international field hockey and is controlled by the Danish Hockey Union, the governing body for field hockey in Denmark.

Denmark has participated in five Olympic Games and has won one silver medal, in 1920. They have never qualified for the World Cup, but they have participated in two European Championships.

== Competitive record ==
=== Summer Olympics ===
Summer Olympics record
Year	Round	Position	Pld	W	D *	L	GF	GA	Squad
(United Kingdom) 1908	did not participate								
(Belgium) 1920	Group stage	2nd	3	2	0	1	15	8	Squad
(Netherlands) 1928	Group stage	5th	4	2	0	2	5	8	Squad
(United States) 1932	did not participate								
(Nazi Germany) 1936	Classification	10th	4	0	1	3	8	21	Squad
(United Kingdom) 1948	Group stage	11th	4	0	1	3	4	17	Squad
(Finland) 1952	did not participate								
(Australia) 1956	did not participate								
(Italy) 1960	Group stage	16th	3	0	0	3	3	18	Squad
(Japan) 1964 until (South Korea) 1988	did not participate								
(Spain) 1992 until (Japan) 2024	did not qualify								
Total	Best: 2nd	5/25	18	4	2	12	35	72	–

=== European championships ===
EuroHockey Championship record
Year	Round	Position	Pld	W	D	L	GF	GA
(Belgium) 1970	17th–19th place pool	18th	6	1	1	4	10	5
(Spain) 1974	13th place game	14th	7	2	1	4	3	14
(West Germany) 1978 until (Germany) 2025	did not qualify							
Total	Best: 14th	2/20	13	3	2	8	13	19

EuroHockey Championships record
Year	Level	Position	Pld	W	D	L	GF	GA	P/R
(Malta) 2005	IV	1st	5	4	0	1	19	5	▲
(Russia) 2007	III	5th	4	0	0	4	9	16	Same position
(Croatia) 2009	III	7th	4	0	0	4	12	19	▼
2011	did not enter								
2013	did not enter								
(Lithuania) 2015	IV	2nd	5	3	1	1	23	9	▲
(Croatia) 2017	III	did not participate							▼
2019	did not enter								
(Malta) 2021	IV	Cancelled							
2023	did not enter								
2025	did not enter								
Total	Highest: III		18	7	1	10	63	49	–
