= 2019 Men's EuroHockey Championship III =

Field hockey tournament

Tournament details
- Host country: Gibraltar
- Dates: 28 July – 3 August
- Teams: 8 (from 1 confederation)
- Venue: Victoria Stadium

Final positions
- Champions: Croatia (1st title)
- Runner-up: Switzerland
- Third place: Gibraltar

Tournament statistics
- Matches played: 20
- Goals scored: 110 (5.5 per match)
- Top scorer: (Switzerland) Martin Greder (6 goals)

The 2019 Men's EuroHockey Championship III was the 8th edition of the men's EuroHockey Championship III, the third level of the European field hockey Championships organized by the European Hockey Federation.

It was held from 28 July to 3 August 2019 in Gibraltar. The tournament also served as a qualifier for the 2021 EuroHockey Championship II, with the finalists Croatia and Switzerland qualifying.

Croatia won their first EuroHockey Championship III title by defeating Switzerland 5–4 in the final. The hosts Gibraltar won the bronze medal by defeating Portugal 7–2.

In a rather high-scoring tournament, 110 goals were scored across the 20 games.

== Qualified teams ==
The following eight teams, shown with pre-tournament world rankings, competed in the tournament.

Dates	Event	Location	Quotas	Qualifier(s)
6–12 August 2017	2017 EuroHockey Championship II	Glasgow, Scotland	2	Portugal (34); Switzerland (31)
30 July – 5 August 2017	2017 EuroHockey Championship III	Sveti Ivan Zelina, Croatia	5	Croatia (40); Lithuania (50); Malta (52); Slovakia (51); Turkey (45)
31 July – 5 August 2017	2017 EuroHockey Championship IV	Lipovci, Slovenia	1	Gibraltar (60)
Total			8	

== Results ==
All times are local (UTC+2).

=== Preliminary round ===
==== Pool A ====
Pos	Team	Pld	W	D	L	GF	GA	GD	Pts	Qualification
1	Switzerland	3	3	0	0	16	1	+15	9	Semi-finals
2	Gibraltar (H)	3	1	1	1	6	5	+1	4	Semi-finals
3	Turkey	3	1	0	2	5	9	−4	3	Pool C
4	Lithuania	3	0	1	2	4	16	−12	1	Pool C

Source: FIH
Rules for classification: 1) points; 2) matches won; 3) goal difference; 4) goals for; 5) head-to-head result; 6) field goals for.
(H) Hosts

28 July 2019
15:45

Switzerland	11–1	Lithuania
Greder 2', 7', 14', 54'; Bergler 19'; Knabenhans 28', 60'; Wyss-Chodat 29'; Stomps 43'; Brönnimann 47'; Gassner 58'	Report	Galkus 53'

Umpires:
Ivan Grgurev (CRO)
Nathan Galea (MLT)

28 July 2019
18:00

Turkey	1–5	Gibraltar
Elagöz 43'	Report	Casciaro 11'; Ramagge 38'; Hernandez 41', 55'; Lopez 57'

Umpires:
Nick Bennett (ENG)
Lubos Kamendy (SVK)

30 July 2019
15:45

Turkey	0–2	Switzerland
	Report	Brönnimann 39'; Greder 42'

Umpires:
Malcolm Coombes (IRL)
Ivan Grgurev (CRO)

30 July 2019
18:00

Lithuania	1–1	Gibraltar
Bubnelis 31'	Report	Lopez 20'

Umpires:
Lubos Kamendy (SVK)
Mahmut Çilkiz (TUR)

31 July 2019
15:45

Lithuania	2–4	Turkey
Balsiukas 49', 53'	Report	Poyraz 10', 58'; Yilmaz 24'; Bakar 40'

Umpires:
Nathan Galea (MLT)
Nick Bennett (ENG)

31 July 2019
18:00

Switzerland	3–0	Gibraltar
Greder 17'; Brönnimann 55'; Hug 57'	Report

Umpires:
Malcolm Coombes (IRL)
Joe Kodde (POR)

==== Pool B ====
Pos	Team	Pld	W	D	L	GF	GA	GD	Pts	Qualification
1	Croatia	3	3	0	0	17	2	+15	9	Semi-finals
2	Portugal	3	2	0	1	14	10	+4	6	Semi-finals
3	Slovakia	3	1	0	2	8	16	−8	3	Pool C
4	Malta	3	0	0	3	3	14	−11	0	Pool C

Source: FIH
Rules for classification: 1) points; 2) matches won; 3) goal difference; 4) goals for; 5) head-to-head result; 6) field goals for.

28 July 2019
09:00

Croatia	7–0	Slovakia
L. Bachmann 14'; Zlimen 25'; A. Fujs 32'; Marković 32'; P. Hršak 36'; Krleža 59'; Vuk 59'	Report

Umpires:
Malcolm Coombes (IRL)
Adrian Bucher (SUI)

28 July 2019
11:15

Portugal	6–0	Malta
Tavares 2'; Rodrigues 9', 43'; Castro 16'; Santos 52'; Ribeiro 56'	Report

Umpires:
Jaroslav Suchocki (LTU)
Mahmut Çilkiz (TUR)

29 July 2019
15:45

Malta	1–3	Slovakia
Cuschieri 49'	Report	Hruska 7'; Kovačevič 14'; Petraš 56'

Umpires:
Joe Kodde (POR)
Adrian Bucher (SUI)

29 July 2019
18:00

Croatia	5–0	Portugal
Mucić 3', 57'; Mucic 30'; Premilovac 34'; L. Bachmann 60'	Report

Umpires:
Nick Bennett (ENG)
Hristiyan Vasilev (BUL)

31 July 2019
09:00

Portugal	8–5	Slovakia
Castro 14', 59'; Tavares 15', 28'; Rodrigues 44'; Caramalho 47', 60'; Ribeiro 60+'	Report	Romanec 5', 56'; Petráš 30'; Bitter 42'; Krampl 45'

Umpires:
Jaroslav Suchocki (LTU)
Adrian Bucher (SUI)

31 July 2019
11:15

Malta	2–5	Croatia
K. Bajada 46'; Sarcia 58'	Report	Bagur 9', 43'; A. Fujs 14'; Marković 29'; Zlimen 36'

Umpires:
Lubos Kamendy (SVK)
Hristiyan Vasilev (BUL)

=== Fifth to eighth place classification ===
==== Pool C ====
The points obtained in the preliminary round against the other team are taken over.

Pos	Team	Pld	W	D	L	GF	GA	GD	Pts	Relegation
5	Turkey	3	2	1	0	6	3	+3	7	
6	Slovakia	3	2	0	1	5	3	+2	6	
7	Lithuania	3	1	0	2	8	9	−1	3	
8	Malta (R)	3	0	1	2	5	9	−4	1	EuroHockey Championship IV

Source: FIH
Rules for classification: 1) points; 2) matches won; 3) goal difference; 4) goals for; 5) head-to-head result; 6) field goals for.
(R) Relegated

2 August 2019
09:00

Lithuania	5–3	Malta
Bubnelis 20', 52'; Balsiukas 34'; Galkus 37', 39'	Report	Borg 45'; K. Bajada 48'; Agius 49'

Umpires:
Malcolm Coombes (IRL)
Mahmut Çilkiz (TUR)

2 August 2019
11:15

Turkey	1–0	Slovakia
Kilinc 45'	Report

Umpires:
Joe Kodde (POR)
Nathan Galea (MLT)

3 August 2019
09:00

Turkey	1–1	Malta
Acikgoz 13'	Report	Calleja 38'

Umpires:
Adrian Bucher (SUI)
Lubos Kamendy (SVK)

3 August 2019
11:15

Slovakia	2–1	Lithuania
Jelačič 32'; Vacha 33'	Report	Balsiukas 23'

Umpires:
Ivan Grgurev (CRO)
Joe Kodde (POR)

=== First to fourth place classification ===
Semi-finals
2 August
Switzerland	3
Portugal	2
2 August
Croatia	1 (4)
Gibraltar	1 (1)

Final
3 August
Switzerland	4
Croatia	5
Third place
3 August
Portugal	2
Gibraltar	7

==== Semi-finals ====
2 August 2019
15:45

Switzerland	3–2	Portugal
Wyss-Chodat 14'; Brönnimann 38'; Knabenhans 60'	Report	Ribeiro 23'; Ferreira 29'

Umpires:
Hristiyan Vasilev (BUL)
Ivan Grgurev (CRO)

2 August 2019
18:00

Croatia	1–1	Gibraltar
A. Fujs 42'	Report	Lopez 28'
Penalties
Vuk (penalty shoot-out scored); Mucić (penalty shoot-out scored); A. Fujs (penalty shoot-out scored); Bachmann (penalty shoot-out scored)	4–1	(penalty shoot-out missed) Silva; (penalty shoot-out scored) Rodriguez; (penalty shoot-out missed) Henwood

Umpires:
Nick Bennett (ENG)
Jaroslav Suchocki (LTU)

==== Third and fourth place ====
3 August 2019
15:45

Portugal	2–7	Gibraltar
Tavares 35'; Rodrigues 40'	Report	S. Ramagge 13'; Lopez 18', 22'; C. Ramagge 20'; Hernandez 38'; Henwood 45+'; Stagno 60'

Umpires:
Hristiyan Vasilev (BUL)
Jaroslav Suchocki (LTU)

==== Final ====
3 August 2019
18:00

Switzerland	4–5	Croatia
Schneider 24'; Stomps 56', 60', 60'	Report	Bachmann 23', 58'; Premilovac 50'; A. Fujs 51'; Zlimen 53'

Umpires:
Malcolm Coombes (IRL)
Nick Bennett (ENG)

== Statistics ==
=== Final standings ===
Rank	Team
Gold medal	Croatia
Silver medal	Switzerland
Bronze medal	Gibraltar
4	Portugal
5	Turkey
6	Slovakia
7	Lithuania
8	Malta

Promoted to the EuroHockey Championship II

Relegated to the EuroHockey Championship IV

=== Goalscorers ===
There have been 110 goals scored in 20 matches, for an average of 5.5 goals per match.

6 goals

- (Switzerland) Martin Greder

5 goals

- (Gibraltar) Julian Lopez

4 goals

- (Croatia) Lucas Bachmann
- (Croatia) Anže Fujs
- (Lithuania) Žygimantas Balsiukas
- (Portugal) Miguel Rodrigues
- (Portugal) Luis Tavares
- (Switzerland) Elias Brönnimann
- (Switzerland) Boris Stomps

3 goals

- (Croatia) Filip Zlimen
- (Gibraltar) Julian Hernandez
- (Portugal) Rodrigo Castro
- (Portugal) Vasco Ribeiro
- (Switzerland) Pascal Knabenhans

2 goals

- (Croatia) Ivan Bagur
- (Croatia) Pavel Marković
- (Croatia) Mario Mucić
- (Croatia) Toni Premilovac
- (Gibraltar) Shane Ramagge
- (Lithuania) Kristis Bubnelis
- (Lithuania) Rokas Galkus
- (Malta) Keith Bajada
- (Portugal) Afonso Caramalho
- (Slovakia) Daniel Petraš
- (Slovakia) Tomáš Romanec
- (Switzerland) Gael Wyss-Chodat
- (Turkey) Numan Poyraz

1 goal

- (Croatia) Petar Hršak
- (Croatia) Josip Krleža
- (Croatia) Marko Mucic
- (Croatia) Zvonimir Vuk
- (Gibraltar) Eric Casciaro
- (Gibraltar) Gareth Henwood
- (Gibraltar) Carl Ramagge
- (Gibraltar) Kayron Stagno
- (Malta) Christ Agius
- (Malta) Jonathan Borg
- (Malta) Keith Calleja
- (Malta) Joseph Cuschieri
- (Malta) Juan Sarcia
- (Portugal) Joao Ferreira
- (Portugal) José Santos
- (Slovakia) Ondrej Bitter
- (Slovakia) Matej Hruska
- (Slovakia) Matej Jelačič
- (Slovakia) Zdenko Kovačevič
- (Slovakia) Matej Krampl
- (Slovakia) Tomáš Vacha
- (Switzerland) Nicolas Bergler
- (Switzerland) Lorenz Gassner
- (Switzerland) Mirko Hug
- (Switzerland) Sebastian Schneider
- (Turkey) Onur Acikgoz
- (Turkey) Isa Bakar
- (Turkey) Müslüm Elagöz
- (Turkey) Vakif Kilinc
- (Turkey) Yaşar Yilmaz

Source: FIH

== See also ==
- 2019 Men's EuroHockey Championship II
- 2019 Men's EuroHockey Championship IV
- 2019 Women's EuroHockey Championship III
