= Slovenia men's national field hockey team =

Slovenia
- Association: Slovenian Hockey Federation
- Confederation: EHF (Europe)

FIH ranking
- Current: 80 ▲1 (4 October 2026)
- Highest: 50 (2009–2010)
- Lowest: 84 (August 2023)

The Slovenia men's national field hockey team represent Slovenia in men's international field hockey competitions and is controlled by the Slovenian Hockey Federation, the governing body for field hockey in Slovenia.

The team competes in the EuroHockey Championship IV, the fourth level of the men's European field hockey championships.

== Tournament record ==
=== EuroHockey Championship III ===
- 2009 – 6th place

=== EuroHockey Championship IV ===
- 2007 – (gold)
- 2017 – (silver)
- 2019 – 5th place
- 2021 – Withdrew

== See also ==
- Slovenia women's national field hockey team
- Yugoslavia men's national field hockey team
