= Cyprus men's national field hockey team =

Cyprus
- Association: Cyprus Hockey Association
- Confederation: EHF (Europe)

FIH ranking
- Current: 49 (19 December 2025)
- Highest: 57 (November 2015 – October 2016, April 2017 – July 2017)
- Lowest: 74 (2007–2008)

The Cyprus men's national field hockey team represents Cyprus in men's international field hockey competitions and is controlled by the Cyprus Hockey Association, the governing body for field hockey in Cyprus.

The team competes in the EuroHockey Championship IV, the fourth level of the men's European field hockey championships.

== Tournament record ==
=== EuroHockey Championship IV ===
- 2005 – 4th place
- 2011 – 4th place
- 2013 – (bronze)
- 2015 – 7th place
- 2017 – 4th place
- 2019 – 4th place
- 2021 – Cancelled

=== Hockey World League ===
- 2016–17 – Round 1

=== FIH Hockey Series ===
- 2018–19 – First round
