= Romanian Field Hockey Federation =

Governing body of field hockey in Romania

Romanian Field Hockey Federation Federaţia Română de Hochei pe Iarbă
- Sport: Hockey
- Jurisdiction: Romania
- Founded: 2003
- Affiliation: International Hockey Federation
- Regional affiliation: European Hockey Federation
- Location: Bucharest, Sos.Dudesti-Pantelimon nr.44, sector 2
- President: Sanda Toma
- Secretary: Dan Codreanu
- (Romania)

The Romanian Field Hockey Federation (Romanian: Federaţia Română de Hochei pe Iarbă) is the national governing body for the sport of field hockey in Romania. Considered as an aristocratic sport and little known to Romanian public, field hockey popularity has grown in the past years. At the youth level, there were 13 teams and over 200 registered players in 2009. Hockey is played mostly at the youth level owing to the Romanian Olympic and Sports Committee's support of the sport for those aged under 18. However, because of the expenses and lack of investors' interest, there are currently no senior teams or competitions.

Field hockey was also played in the 20th century in Romania, but it disappeared during the communist regime in the 1960s.

The Romanian hockey national team plays regularly in competitions such as the Balkan Championships and the European Championships.

== Local clubs and teams ==
Some of the hockey teams that play at this level are CSS Târgu-Mureş, CSS 2 Bucharest, Antilopa Bucharest, Rapid Bucharest, Hockey System Bucharest, CSS Odorheiu Secuiesc.
