= Hungary men's national field hockey team =

Hungary
- Association: Hungarian Hockey Association
- Confederation: EHF (Europe)

FIH ranking
- Current: 86 (4 October 2026)
- Highest: 46 (2003)
- Lowest: 72 (2007)

Olympic Games
- Appearances: 1 (first in 1936)
- Best result: 8th (1936)

EuroHockey Championship
- Appearances: 1 (first in 1970)
- Best result: 17th (1970)

The Hungary men's national field hockey team represents Hungary in international field hockey competitions.

== Tournament record ==
=== Summer Olympics ===
- 1936 – 8th place

=== EuroHockey Championship ===
- 1970 – 17th place

=== EuroHockey Championship III ===
- 2005 – 7th place
- 2021 – Withdrew
- 2025 – 7th place

=== EuroHockey Championship IV ===
- 2015 – 5th place
- 2017 – (bronze)
- 2019 – (gold)

== Results and fixtures ==
The following is a list of match results in the last 12 months, as well as any future matches that have been scheduled.

Win Draw Loss Fixture

=== 2026 ===
==== EuroHockey Championship Qualifier II ====
10 July 2026 Pool A	Hungary	0–4	Lithuania	Helsinki, Finland
14:00		Report	Sinkevičius 33', 39'; Burkot 56', 58'	Stadium: Velodromi Outdoor

11 July 2026 Pool A	Luxembourg	5–0	Hungary	Helsinki, Finland
13:45	Krampe 5', 35'; Verschoren 15+'; Ulitzka 40'; Ensch 45'	Report		Stadium: Velodromi Outdoor

12 July 2026 Fifth place match	Hungary	0–2	Finland	Helsinki, Finland
13:15		Report	Rantala 38'; Könönen 47'	Stadium: Velodromi Outdoor

== Current squad ==
No.	Pos.	Player	Date of birth (age)	Caps	Club
		Alexian Csogor			(Hungary)
		Daniel Patko			(Hungary)
		Zsigmond Szoga			(Hungary)
		Martina Csogor			(Hungary)
		Tamas Suba			(Hungary)
		Benedek Kozari			(Hungary)
		Gyorgy Szabo			(Hungary)
		Adam Szuchy			(Hungary)
		Andras Balogh			(Hungary)
		Marton Wesseleyni			(Hungary)
		Sebastian Leber			(Hungary)
		Huba Herberth			(Hungary)
		Tamas Balogh			(Hungary)
17	GK	Gergely Papp			(Hungary)
		Andras Hortobagyi			(Hungary)
		Balint Palotai			(Hungary)
		Daniel Deli			(Hungary)
31	GK	Balazs Petovari			(Hungary)

== See also ==
- Hungary women's national field hockey team
