= Norway men's national field hockey team =

Norway
- Association: Norway's Bandy Association
- Confederation: EHF (Europe)

FIH ranking
- Current: 74 ▼14 (9 March 2026)
- Highest: 74 (June 2016 – August 2016, September 2019 – present)
- Lowest: 83 (January 2019)

The Norway men's national field hockey team represents Norway in men's international field hockey competitions and is controlled by the field hockey section of Norway's Bandy Association, the governing body for field hockey in Norway.

The team competes in the EuroHockey Championship IV, the fourth level of the men's European field hockey championships.

== Tournament record ==
=== EuroHockey Championship IV ===
Men's EuroHockey Championship

- 2015 – 8th place
- 2019 – (bronze)
- 2021 – Withdrew

== Results and fixtures ==
The following is a list of match results in the last 12 months, as well as any future matches that have been scheduled.

Win Draw Loss Fixture

=== 2026 ===
==== Oslo Test series ====
13 June 2026 Test 1	Norway	1–1	Finland	Oslo, Norway
11:00	Zafar 14'	Report	Rihtilä 44'	Stadium: Mortensrud Landhockeybane

14 June 2026 Test 2	Norway	0–5	Finland	Oslo, Norway
09:30		Report	Rantala 16', 40'; Rihtilä 17', 18'; Karjalainen 42'	Stadium: Mortensrud Landhockeybane
