= Malta men's national field hockey team =

Malta
- Nickname(s): Sdieri (waistcoats)
- Association: Hockey Association Malta
- Confederation: EHF (Europe)
- Head Coach: Chris Attard
- Assistant coach(es): Kevin Micallef, Matthew Buhagiar
- Manager: Andrew Camilleri
- Captain: Joseph Cuschieri

FIH ranking
- Current: 78 ▲2 (4 October 2026)
- Highest: 50 (July 2018 – December 2018)
- Lowest: 79 (August 2026)

EuroHockey Championship
- Appearances: 1 (first in 1970)
- Best result: 19th (1970)

The Malta men's national field hockey team represents Malta in men's international field hockey competitions.

The team is operated by the Hockey Association Malta.

== Tournament record ==
=== EuroHockey Championship ===
- 1970 – 19th place

=== EuroHockey Championship III ===
- 2017 – 5th place
- 2019 – 8th place
- 2021 – 7th place
- 2023 – 4th place
- 2025 – 6th place

=== EuroHockey Championship IV ===
- 2005 – (bronze)
- 2015 – 4th place
- 2021 – Cancelled

== Results and fixtures ==
The following is a list of match results in the last 12 months, as well as any future matches that have been scheduled.

Win Draw Loss Fixture

=== 2026 ===
==== EuroHockey Championship Qualifier II ====
9 July 2026 Pool B	Malta	3–2	Greece	Helsinki, Finland
16:15	Degiovanni 40', 57'; Ellul-Turner 59'	Report	Welzel 34', 34'	Stadium: Velodromi Outdoor

10 July 2026 Pool B	Malta	1–3	Finland	Helsinki, Finland
18:30	Degiovanni 22'	Report	Rihtilä 43'; Laiho 47'; Määttänen 51'	Stadium: Velodromi Outdoor

11 July 2026 Pool B	Gibraltar	2–2	Malta	Helsinki, Finland
16:00	Bossano-Anes 48'; Cox 52'	Report	Degiovanni 22'; Rapinett 29'	Stadium: Velodromi Outdoor

12 July 2026 Third place match	Luxembourg	1–1 (4–3 p)	Malta	Helsinki, Finland
15:30	Schmit 3'	Report	Agius 24'	Stadium: Velodromi Outdoor
	Penalties
	Verschoren (penalty shoot-out scored); Ensch (penalty shoot-out scored); Bouche (penalty shoot-out missed); Clarinval (penalty shoot-out scored); Masset (penalty shoot-out scored)		(penalty shoot-out scored) Calleja; (penalty shoot-out scored) Pace Gasan; (penalty shoot-out missed) Degiovanni; (penalty shoot-out missed) Dimech; (penalty shoot-out scored) Fsadni

==== Test Series ====
29 August 2026 Match 1	Italy	14–0	Malta	Rome, Italy
17:00	Muzzioli 7'; Faggian 8', 36', 58', 60'; L. Palumbo 12', 13'; Frascino 23', 25', 49'; Brocco 38', 41'; Biocca 55'; G. Palombi 59'	Report		Stadium: Olympic Center Giulio Onesti

30 August 2026 Match 2	Italy	12–0	Malta	Rome, Italy
11:00	Brocco 3', 40'; Dionisi Vici 9', 42', 60'; Giuliani 14', 56'; Biocca 19'; Frascino 22', 45'; Faggian 32', 51'	Report		Stadium: Olympic Center Giulio Onesti
