= Tour de Helsinki =

The Tour de Helsinki was an annual cyclosportive in the metropolitan area of Helsinki, the capital of Finland. It took place on the first Sunday in September.

Start and finish were at the Helsinki Velodrome, originally built for the 1952 Summer Olympics. The distance of the race, leading through the southern parts of the Uusimaa region, was 140 km.

Every year, the Tour de Helsinki featured some cycling professionals; e.g. Kjell Carlström, Kimmo Kananen and Jussi Veikkanen took part in the event. In 2010 and 2011, also Minister Alexander Stubb was among the participants.

After 2015 the event was no longer held.

== Number of participants ==
The event was first organized in 2007, by initiative of five cycling clubs from the capital region (Prologi, CCH, IK-32, Vantaan Pyöräilijät and Helsingin Polkupyöräilijät). The first event started with over 400 participants and one year later, in 2008, it had already grown to over 950 cyclists.

In 2011, almost 2200 people participated in the event.

Year	Total	Women	Men
2012	2291		
2011	2187		
2010	1831	149	1682
2009	1311	124	1187
2008	950		
2007	400		
