= 2015 Men's EuroHockey Championship IV =

Field hockey tournament

2015 EuroHockey Championship IV
Tournament details
- Host country: Lithuania
- City: Vilnius
- Dates: 19–25 July
- Teams: 8 (from 1 confederation)

Final positions
- Champions: Slovakia (1st title)
- Runner-up: Denmark
- Third place: Lithuania

Tournament statistics
- Matches played: 20
- Goals scored: 100 (5 per match)
- Top scorer: (Denmark) Tobias Grand (7 goals)

The 2015 Men's EuroHockey Championship IV was the sixth edition of the EuroHockey Championship IV, the fourth tier of the European field hockey championships. It was held from 19 to 25 July 2015 in Vilnius, Lithuania.

The tournament also served as a qualifier for the 2017 EuroHockey Championship III with the winner, Slovakia and the runner-up, Denmark qualifying.

== Teams ==
The following eight teams competed in the tournament:

- Cyprus
- Denmark
- Finland
- Hungary
- Lithuania
- Malta
- Norway
- Slovakia

== Results ==
=== Preliminary round ===
==== Pool A ====
| Pos | Team | Pld | W | D | L | GF | GA | GD | Pts | Qualification |
|---|---|---|---|---|---|---|---|---|---|---|
| 1 | Denmark | 3 | 2 | 1 | 0 | 17 | 5 | +12 | 7 | Semi-finals |
| 2 | Slovakia | 3 | 2 | 1 | 0 | 16 | 7 | +9 | 7 | Semi-finals |
| 3 | Norway | 3 | 1 | 0 | 2 | 3 | 19 | −16 | 3 | Pool C |
| 4 | Hungary | 3 | 0 | 0 | 3 | 2 | 7 | −5 | 0 | Pool C |

Source: FIH
Rules for classification: 1) points; 2) goal difference; 3) goals scored; 4) head-to-head result.

19 July 2015
10:15

| Denmark | 11–0 | Norway |
|---|---|---|
| Dahl 5', 26'; Grand 13', 47', 53', 62'; Trepacz 16', 24'; T. Christensen 46', 67'; Hansen 60' | Report |

Umpires:
Dimitry Zhabin (RUS)
Christos Georghiades (CYP)

19 July 2015
12:30

| Slovakia | 4–1 | Hungary |
|---|---|---|
| Petrakovic 30', 35+'; Romanec 45'; Michalovic 52' | Report | Kovacs 4' |

Umpires:
Luke Busuttil Leaver (MLT)
Vitas Guziejus (LTU)

20 July 2015
10:15

| Hungary | 0–1 | Norway |
|---|---|---|
| | Report | Singh 32' |

Umpires:
Luke Busuttil Leaver (MLT)
Christian Gibson (FIN)

20 July 2015
12:30

| Denmark | 4–4 | Slovakia |
|---|---|---|
| L. Christensen 23', 53', 54'; Grand 61' | Report | Romanec 5'; Hruska 38'; Michalovic 50'; Cernansky 67' |

Umpires:
Michiel Otten (NED)
Vitas Guziejus (LTU)

22 July 2015
10:15

| Hungary | 1–2 | Denmark |
|---|---|---|
| Botka 43' | Report | Grand 5'; L. Christensen 49' |

Umpires:
Michiel Otten (NED)
Christos Georghiades (CYP)

22 July 2015
12:30

| Slovakia | 8–2 | Norway |
|---|---|---|
| Jelačič 1', 9', 33', 70', 70+'; Kovačevič 20'; Romanec 30'; Petrakovic 31' | Report | Zia 22'; Garcha 28' |

Umpires:
Christian Gibson (FIN)
Vitas Guziejus (LTU)

==== Pool B ====
| Pos | Team | Pld | W | D | L | GF | GA | GD | Pts | Qualification |
|---|---|---|---|---|---|---|---|---|---|---|
| 1 | Lithuania (H) | 3 | 3 | 0 | 0 | 12 | 3 | +9 | 9 | Semi-finals |
| 2 | Malta | 3 | 2 | 0 | 1 | 10 | 6 | +4 | 6 | Semi-finals |
| 3 | Cyprus | 3 | 1 | 0 | 2 | 4 | 7 | −3 | 3 | Pool C |
| 4 | Finland | 3 | 0 | 0 | 3 | 3 | 13 | −10 | 0 | Pool C |

Source: FIH
Rules for classification: 1) points; 2) goal difference; 3) goals scored; 4) head-to-head result.
(H) Hosts

19 July 2015
14:45

| Cyprus | 3–1 | Finland |
|---|---|---|
| Weare 17'; Efthymiou 27'; Michael 37' | Report | Jalonen 39' |

Umpires:
Daniel Denta (DEN)
Tamas Hermann (HUN)

19 July 2015
17:00

| Lithuania | 4–2 | Malta |
|---|---|---|
| Balsiukas 37', 42'; Jackevicius 55'; Bandziulis | Report | Williams 26'; Sarcia 70' |

Umpires:
Michal Margolien (SVK)
Shabbir Mohammed (NOR)

20 July 2015
14:45

| Finland | 1–5 | Malta |
|---|---|---|
| Fiskaali 11' | Report | Williams 16'; Borg 26'; Sarcia 33'; Grima 64'; Tanti 68' |

Umpires:
Daniel Denta (DEN)
Shabbir Mohammed (NOR)

20 July 2015
17:00

| Lithuania | 3–0 | Cyprus |
|---|---|---|
| Balsiukas 8', 50'; Kringelis 55' | Report |

Umpires:
Michal Margolien (SVK)
Tamas Hermann (HUN)

22 July 2015
14:45

| Cyprus | 1–3 | Malta |
|---|---|---|
| Ilgin 26' | Report | Borg Costanzi 35+'; Calleja 50'; Borg 59' |

Umpires:
Dimitry Zhabin (RUS)
Tamas Hermann (HUN)

22 July 2015
17:00

| Finland | 1–5 | Lithuania |
|---|---|---|
| Danhieux 2' | Report | Lekys 6'; Jackevicius 9', 64'; Balsiukas 23'; Suchocki 59' |

Umpires:
Luke Busuttil Leaver (MLT)
Shabbir Mohammed (NOR)

=== Fifth to eighth place classification ===
==== Pool C ====
The points obtained in the preliminary round against the other team are taken over.

| Pos | Team | Pld | W | D | L | GF | GA | GD | Pts |
|---|---|---|---|---|---|---|---|---|---|
| 5 | Hungary | 3 | 1 | 1 | 1 | 4 | 2 | +2 | 4 |
| 6 | Finland | 3 | 1 | 1 | 1 | 5 | 5 | 0 | 4 |
| 7 | Cyprus | 3 | 1 | 1 | 1 | 5 | 6 | −1 | 4 |
| 8 | Norway | 3 | 1 | 1 | 1 | 4 | 5 | −1 | 4 |

Source: FIH
Rules for classification: 1) points; 2) goal difference; 3) goals scored; 4) head-to-head result.

24 July 2015
09:45

| Hungary | 1–1 | Finland |
|---|---|---|
| Leber 7' | Report | Äärelä 17' |

Umpires:
Luke Busuttil Leaver (MLT)
Christos Georghiades (CYP)

24 July 2015
12:00

| Norway | 2–2 | Cyprus |
|---|---|---|
| Kiyani 43'; Singh 47' | Report | Weare 20'; Efthymiou 28' |

Umpires:
Tamas Hermann (HUN)
Christian Gibson (FIN)

25 July 2015
08:30

| Norway | 1–3 | Finland |
|---|---|---|
| Kiyani 52' | Report | Jalonen 12', 65'; Fiskaali 44' |

Umpires:
Vitas Guziejus (LTU)
Christos Georghiades (CYP)

25 July 2015
10:45

| Cyprus | 0–3 | Hungary |
|---|---|---|
| | Report | Kovacs 15', 61'; Wesselenyi 65' |

Umpires:
Christian Gibson (FIN)
Shabbir Mohammed (NOR)

=== First to fourth place classification ===
Semi-finals
24 July
Lithuania | 2
Slovakia | 3
24 July
Denmark | 5
Malta | 1

Final
25 July
Slovakia | 3
Denmark | 1
Third place
25 July
Lithuania | 4
Malta | 1

==== Semi-finals ====
24 July 2015
14:15

| Denmark | 5–1 | Malta |
|---|---|---|
| Trepacz 33'; L. Christensen 39'; Buur 61'; Dahl 62'; Grand 66' | Report | Sarcia 39' |

Umpires:
Dimitry Zhabin (RUS)
Michal Margolien (SVK)

24 July 2015
16:45

| Lithuania | 2–3 | Slovakia |
|---|---|---|
| Gridziuška 23', 63' | Report | Petrakovic 5'; Romanec 18', 45' |

Umpires:
Daniel Denta (DEN)
Michiel Otten (NED)

==== Third and fourth place ====
25 July 2015
13:15

| Lithuania | 4–1 | Malta |
|---|---|---|
| Balsiukas 16'; Asanavicius 42', 55'; Jackevicius 61' | Report | Williams 60' |

Umpires:
Daniel Denta (DEN)
Michal Margolien (SVK)

==== Final ====
25 July 2015
15:45

| Slovakia | 3–1 | Denmark |
|---|---|---|
| Petrakovic 35+'; Hruska 55'; Romanec 69' | Report | Kjellerup 29' |

Umpires:
Michiel Otten (NED)
Dimitry Zhabin (RUS)

== Final standings ==
| Rank | Team |
|---|---|
| Gold medal | Slovakia |
| Silver medal | Denmark |
| Bronze medal | Lithuania |
| 4 | Malta |
| 5 | Hungary |
| 6 | Finland |
| 7 | Cyprus |
| 8 | Norway |

Promoted to the EuroHockey Championship III
