= Lithuania men's national field hockey team =

Lithuania
- Association: Lithuanian Hockey Federation
- Confederation: EHF (Europe)
- Head Coach: Casper Claassen
- Manager: Donata Grigiene
- Captain: Zygimantas Balsiukas

FIH ranking
- Current: 62 ▼2 (18 June 2026)
- Highest: 48 (October 2017 – December 2018)
- Lowest: 77 (August 2023)

The Lithuania men's national field hockey team represents Lithuania in men's international field hockey competitions.

== Tournament record ==
=== EuroHockey Championship II ===
- 2027 – Qualified

=== EuroHockey Championship III ===
- 2017 – 6th place
- 2019 – 7th place
- 2021 – 6th place
- 2023 – 5th place

=== EuroHockey Championship IV ===
- 2007 – 4th place
- 2015 – (bronze)

=== Hockey World league ===
- 2014–15 – Round 1
- 2016–17 – Round 1

=== FIH Hockey Series ===
- 2018–19 – First round

== Results and fixtures ==
The following is a list of match results in the last 12 months, as well as any future matches that have been scheduled.

Win Draw Loss Fixture

=== 2026 ===
==== EuroHockey Championship Qualifier II ====
9 July 2026 Pool A	Lithuania	2–1	Luxembourg	Helsinki, Finland
14:00	Vaikenas 29'; Burkot 54'	Report	Krampe 57'	Stadium: Velodromi Outdoor

10 July 2026 Pool A	Hungary	0–4	Lithuania	Helsinki, Finland
14:00		Report	Sinkevičius 33', 39'; Burkot 56', 58'	Stadium: Velodromi Outdoor

12 July 2026 Final	Lithuania	3–3 (2–1 p)	Gibraltar	Helsinki, Finland
17:45	Petkevič 7'; Sinkevičiius 30', 33'	Report	Bossano-Annes 30+', 32'; Lopez 54'	Stadium: Velodromi Outdoor
	Penalties
	Sinkevičius (penalty shoot-out scored); Ridlauskas (penalty shoot-out missed); Lopato (penalty shoot-out missed); Stankevič (penalty shoot-out scored)		(penalty shoot-out scored) Cox; (penalty shoot-out missed) Duo; (penalty shoot-out missed) Bossano-Anes; (penalty shoot-out missed) Caetano; (penalty shoot-out missed) Lopez

== See also ==
- Lithuania women's national field hockey team
- Soviet Union men's national field hockey team
