= Cyprus Hockey Association =

Governing body of field hockey in Cyprus

Cyprus Hockey Association Kυπριακή Oμοσπονδία Χόκεϋ
- Headquarters: Nicosia
- Location: Cyprus
- Website: hockey.org.cy

The Cyprus Hockey Association is the national governing body for the sport of field hockey in Cyprus. At club level, it runs the field hockey leagues and organises representation of Cyprus in the EuroHockey Club Trophy and Challenge.

It is also responsible for organising the Cyprus national field hockey team. It is a member of the European Hockey Federation and the International Hockey Federation.

As of July 30, 2007, the Cyprus National field hockey team ranked 58th in the world.

== History ==
The Cyprus national team is currently the most powerful in the EuroHockey Challenge
