= Bulgarian Hockey Federation =

Governing body of field hockey in Bulgaria

The Bulgaria Hockey Federation (BHF) is the governing body of field hockey in Bulgaria. Its headquarters are in Sofia, Bulgaria. It is affiliated to IHF International Hockey Federation and EHF European Hockey Federation.

Jörg Schenk is the president of Hockey Association of Bulgaria and Antonio Antonov is the Executive Director.

== Tournament history ==
EuroHockey Nations Championship

- 2005 Women's EuroHockey Championship III - 6th place
- 2011 Women's EuroHockey Championship III - 6th place

== See also ==
- European Hockey Federation
