= Field hockey at the Summer Olympics =

- IOC Code: HOC
- Governing body: FIH
- Events: 2 (men: 1; women: 1)

Summer Olympics
- 1896; 1900; 1904; 1908; 1912; 1920; 1924; 1928; 1932; 1936; 1948; 1952; 1956; 1960; 1964; 1968; 1972; 1976; 1980; 1984; 1988; 1992; 1996; 2000; 2004; 2008; 2012; 2016; 2020; 2024; 2028; 2032
- Medalists

Field hockey made its debut at the Modern Olympic Games as a men's competition in the 1908 Games in London. It was removed from the Olympic schedule of the Summer Olympic Games for the 1924 Paris Games and was reintroduced in the 1928 Amsterdam Games. The Women's field hockey was introduced into the Olympic programme at the 1980 Moscow Olympics.

The International Hockey Federation (FIH) was founded in 1924 and governs the field hockey events. Until the 1988 Summer Olympics, the tournaments were invitational, but a qualification system was introduced since the 1992 Barcelona Olympics. The last edition at Paris was the 25th occurrence of the men's event and 12th consecutive occurrence of women's event in the Olympics.

India is the most successful team in the men's Olympic competition, having won a record eight gold medals. Netherlands is the most successful team in the women's competition, winning a record five gold medals. India also holds the record for the most appearances in the men's event with 22, while Netherlands and Australia hold the same record for the women's event, with 11 appearances each.

Great Britain won the first two editions of the men's event in 1908 and 1920. India won the gold medal in seven out of eight Olympics from 1928 to 1964, with Pakistan winning three gold and silver medals each between the 1956 and 1984 Games. The matches are played on artificial turf since 1976. Since the late 1980s, European nations have dominated the field hockey events with Germany and Netherlands having won three gold medals each in the men's event. In the women's event, Netherlands and Australia have been dominant, having won five and three gold medals respectively since its introduction in 1980.

== History ==
Field hockey was introduced at the Modern Olympic Games as a men's competition at the 1908 Games in London. Great Britain won the first two editions in 1908 (as England) and 1920. It was removed from the Olympic schedule of the Summer Olympic Games for the 1924 Paris Games because of the lack of an international sporting structure. The International Hockey Federation (FIH) was founded in Paris that year as a response to the same. Men's field hockey was added to the Olympics for the next Olympic Games in 1928 Games held at Amsterdam.

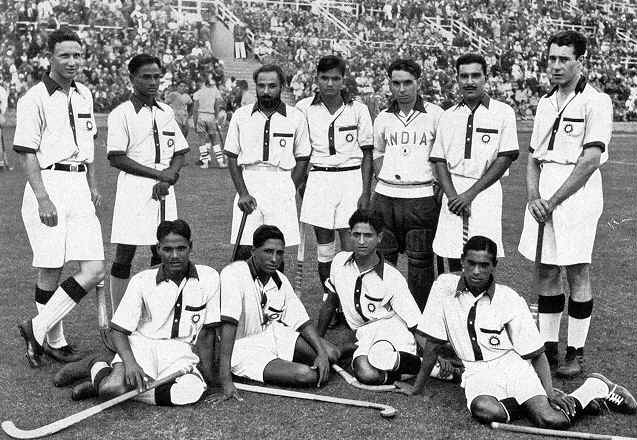
Indian team that won the gold at the 1936 Berlin Olympics

Starting in 1928, India won the gold medal in seven out of eight Olympics till 1964 including six consecutive gold medals from the 1928 Olympics to 1956. Pakistan won its first gold medal in 1960 and won three gold and silver medals each in a run lasting from 1956 to 1984. West Germany won the gold medal in the 1972 Munich Olympics, for the first gold medal by a non-Asian country since 1928. Olympic field hockey games were first played on artificial turf at the 1976 Montreal Games and was won by New Zealand. The domination of both the Asian countries came to an end in the late 1980s with India winning its last gold medal in the competition in 1980 and Pakistan in 1984.

Though the International Federation of Women’s Hockey Associations (IFWHA) was founded way back in 1927, Women's field hockey made its debut at the Summer Olympics only at the 1980 Moscow Olympics and was won by Zimbabwe. On 23 April 1983, women’s hockey programme was taken over by FIH and the IFWHA was dissolved. Great Britain won its first gold medal in the men's event since 1920 in the 1988 Seoul Olympics.

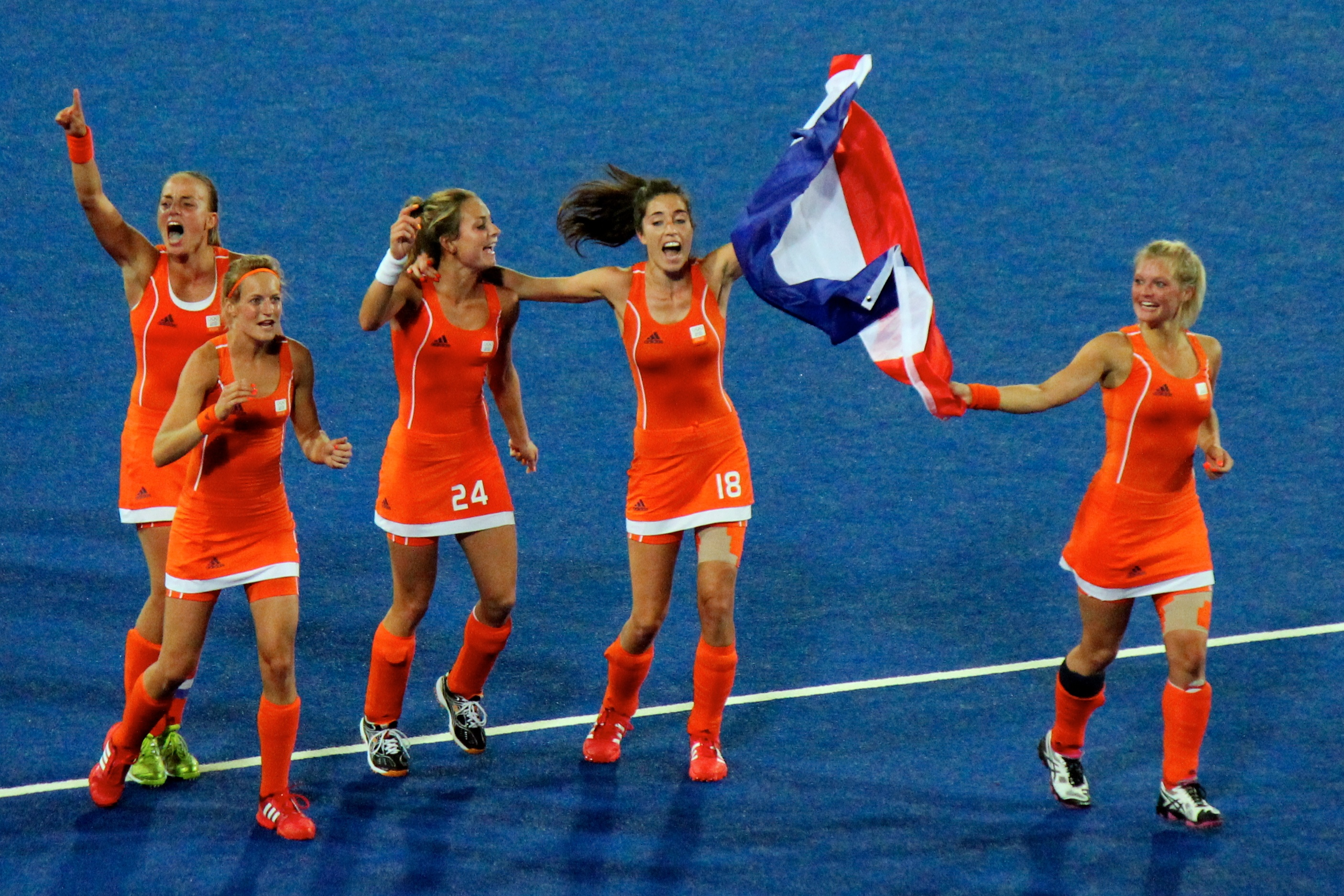
Netherlands women's team after winning gold at the 2012 Olympics

Until the 1988 Olympics, the tournament was invitational but FIH introduced a qualification system starting from the 1992 Barcelona Olympics. Since the 1990s, European countries have been dominant in the men's sport with the only exceptions being the wins by Australia in 2004 and Argentina in 2016. Both Germany and Netherlands have won three gold medals each, with the only other European winner being Belgium in 2020. In the women's events, Netherlands and Australia have been dominant, having won five and three gold medals respectively since its introduction to the Olympic programme in 1980. The only other winners of the women's event were Spain in 1992, Germany in 2004, and Great Britain in 2016.

The last edition of both the men's and women's events were held as a part of the 2024 Paris Olympics with Netherlands winning both the events. India holds the record for the most appearances in the Olympic men's competitions (22) and Spain has appeared in the most Olympic men's competitions (19) without winning the men's gold medal with the best place finishes being the silver medal won in 1980, 1996, and 2008. Australia and Netherlands hold the record for the most appearances in the Olympic women's competitions (11). India leads the medal tally for the men's events with 13 medals including eight gold medals. Netherlands heads the women's events with 10 medals including five gold medals and also leads the overall medal tally with 20 medals (eight gold, six silver and six bronze).

== Men ==
=== Results ===
Year	Host	Gold medal match			Bronze medal match			Number of teams
Year	Host	Gold medal	Score	Silver medal	Bronze medal	Score	Fourth place	Number of teams
1908; Details	London, Great Britain	Great Britain (England)	8–1	Great Britain (Ireland)	Great Britain (Scotland) Great Britain (Wales)	(Note: There was no bronze medal match for the 1908 Games in London.)		6
1912	Stockholm, Sweden	No tournament						
1920; Details	Antwerp, Belgium	Great Britain	5–1	Denmark	Belgium	3–2	France	4
1924	Paris, France	No tournament						
1928; Details	Amsterdam, Netherlands	India	3–0	Netherlands	Germany	3–0	Belgium	9
1932; Details	Los Angeles, United States	India	(Note: Three teams participated in the 1932 tournament, so they played a round-robin format.)	Japan	United States			3
1936; Details	Berlin, Germany	India	8–1	Germany	Netherlands	4–3	France	11
1948; Details	London, Great Britain	India	4–0	Great Britain	Netherlands	1–1; 4–1 (Replay)	Pakistan	13
1952; Details	Helsinki, Finland	India	6–1	Netherlands	Great Britain	2–1	Pakistan	12
1956; Details	Melbourne, Australia	India	1–0	Pakistan	United Team of Germany (Note: The United Team of Germany was the combined team from West Germany and East Germany that competed together at the Olympic Games from 1956 to 1964. Then each country sent independent teams from 1968 to 1988.)	3–1	Great Britain	12
1960; Details	Rome, Italy	Pakistan	1–0	India	Spain	2–1	Great Britain	16
1964; Details	Tokyo, Japan	India	1–0	Pakistan	Australia	3–2 (a.e.t.)	Spain	15
1968; Details	Mexico City, Mexico	Pakistan	2–1	Australia	India	2–1	West Germany	16
1972; Details	Munich, West Germany	West Germany	1–0	Pakistan	India	2–1	Netherlands	16
1976; Details	Montreal, Canada	New Zealand	1–0	Australia	Pakistan	3–2	Netherlands	11
1980; Details	Moscow, Soviet Union	India	4–3	Spain	Soviet Union	2–1	Poland	6
1984; Details	Los Angeles, United States	Pakistan	2–1 (a.e.t.)	West Germany	Great Britain	3–2	Australia	12
1988; Details	Seoul, South Korea	Great Britain	3–1	West Germany	Netherlands	2–1	Australia	12
1992; Details	Barcelona, Spain	Germany	2–1	Australia	Pakistan	4–3	Netherlands	12
1996; Details	Atlanta, United States	Netherlands	3–1	Spain	Australia	3–2	Germany	12
2000; Details	Sydney, Australia	Netherlands	3–3 (5–4); Penalty strokes	South Korea	Australia	6–3	Pakistan	12
2004; Details	Athens, Greece	Australia	2–1 (a.e.t.)	Netherlands	Germany	4–3 (a.e.t.)	Spain	12
2008; Details	Beijing, China	Germany	1–0	Spain	Australia	6–2	Netherlands	12
2012; Details	London, Great Britain	Germany	2–1	Netherlands	Australia	3–1	Great Britain	12
2016; Details	Rio de Janeiro, Brazil	Argentina	4–2	Belgium	Germany	1–1 (4–3); Penalty shootout	Netherlands	12
2020; Details	Tokyo, Japan	Belgium	1–1 (3–2); Penalty shootout	Australia	India	5–4	Germany	12
2024; Details	Paris, France	Netherlands	1–1 (3–1); Penalty shootout	Germany	India	2–1	Spain	12
2028; Details	Los Angeles, United States							12
2032; Details	Brisbane, Australia							12

=== Men's medal table ===
Rank	Nation	Gold	Silver	Bronze	Total
1	India (Note: Includes three gold medals as British India)	8	1	4	13
2	Netherlands	3	4	3	10
3	Pakistan	3	3	2	8
4	Great Britain	3	2	4	9
5	Germany	3	2	3	8
6	Australia	1	4	5	10
7	West Germany	1	2	0	3
8	Belgium	1	1	1	3
9	Argentina	1	0	0	1
9	New Zealand	1	0	0	1
11	Spain	0	3	1	4
12	Denmark	0	1	0	1
12	Japan	0	1	0	1
12	South Korea	0	1	0	1
15	Soviet Union	0	0	1	1
15	United States	0	0	1	1
15	United Team of Germany	0	0	1	1
Totals (17 entries)		25	25	26	76

=== Top four statistics ===
Team	Winners	Runners-up	Third place	Fourth place
India	8 (1928, 1932, 1936, 1948, 1952, 1956, 1964, 1980)	1 (1960)	4 (1968, 1972, 2020, 2024)	
Germany (Note: Includes results representing the United Team of Germany from 1956 to 1964 and West Germany from 1968 to 1988)	4 (1972*, 1992, 2008, 2012)	4 (1936*, 1984, 1988, 2024)	4 (1928, 1956, 2004, 2016)	3 (1968, 1996, 2020)
Netherlands	3 (1996, 2000, 2024)	4 (1928*, 1952, 2004, 2012)	3 (1936, 1948, 1988)	5 (1972, 1976, 1992, 2008, 2016)
Pakistan	3 (1960, 1968, 1984)	3 (1956, 1964, 1972)	2 (1976, 1992)	3 (1948, 1952, 2000)
Great Britain	3 (1908*, 1920, 1988)	2 (1908*, 1948*)	4 (1908*, 1908*, 1952, 1984)	3 (1956, 1960, 2012*)
Australia	1 (2004)	4 (1968, 1976, 1992, 2020)	5 (1964, 1996, 2000*, 2008, 2012)	2 (1984, 1988)
Belgium	1 (2020)	1 (2016)	1 (1920*)	1 (1928)
New Zealand	1 (1976)			
Argentina	1 (2016)			
Spain		3 (1980, 1996, 2008)	1 (1960)	3 (1964, 2004, 2024)
Denmark		1 (1920)		
Japan		1 (1932)		
South Korea		1 (2000)		
United States			1 (1932*)	
Soviet Union			1 (1980*)	
France				2 (1920, 1936)
Poland				1 (1980)

* = host nation

=== Team appearances ===
Since the debut of the field hockey on the sports programme in 1908, 45 teams have competed in at least one Olympic Games.

Team	(United Kingdom) 1908	(Belgium) 1920	(Netherlands) 1928	(United States) 1932	(Nazi Germany) 1936	(United Kingdom) 1948	(Finland) 1952	(Australia) 1956	(Italy) 1960	(Japan) 1964	(Mexico) 1968	(West Germany) 1972	(Canada) 1976	(Soviet Union) 1980	(United States) 1984	(South Korea) 1988	(Spain) 1992	(United States) 1996	(Australia) 2000	(Greece) 2004	(China) 2008	(United Kingdom) 2012	(Brazil) 2016	(Japan) 2020	(France) 2024	(United States) 2028	Total
Afghanistan	–	–	–	–	6th	8th	–	11th	–	–	–	–	–	–	–	–	–	–	–	–	–	–	–	–	–		3
Argentina	–	–	–	–	–	5th	–	–	–	–	14th	14th	11th	–	–	8th	11th	9th	8th	11th	–	10th	1st	7th	8th		13
Australia	–	–	–	–	–	–	–	5th	6th	3rd	2nd	5th	2nd	–	4th	4th	2nd	3rd	3rd	1st	3rd	3rd	6th	2nd	6th		17
Austria	–	–	9th	–	–	8th	7th	–	–	–	–	–	–	–	–	–	–	–	–	–	–	–	–	–	–		3
Belgium	–	3rd	4th	–	9th	5th	9th	7th	11th	11th	9th	10th	9th	–	–	–	–	–	–	–	9th	5th	2nd	1st	5th	Q	17
Brazil	–	–	–	–	–	–	–	–	–	–	–	–	–	–	–	–	–	–	–	–	–	–	12th	–	–		1
Canada	–	–	–	–	–	–	–	–	–	13th	–	–	10th	–	12th	11th	–	–	10th	–	10th	–	11th	12th	–		8
China	–	–	–	–	–	–	–	–	–	–	–	–	–	–	–	–	–	–	–	–	11th	–	–	–	–		1
CIS	–																10th	Defunct									1
Cuba	–	–	–	–	–	–	–	–	–	–	–	–	–	5th	–	–	–	–	–	–	–	–	–	–	–		1
Denmark	–	2nd	5th	–	10th	11th	–	–	16th	–	–	–	–	–	–	–	–	–	–	–	–	–	–	–	–		5
East Germany	–										11th	–	–	–	–	–	Defunct										1
Egypt	–	–	–	–	–	–	–	–	–	–	–	–	–	–	–	–	12th	–	–	12th	–	–	–	–	–		2
England	1st	Part of Great Britain																									1
Finland	–	–	–	–	–	–	9th	–	–	–	–	–	–	–	–	–	–	–	–	–	–	–	–	–	–		1
France	6th	4th	5th	–	4th	8th	11th	–	10th	–	10th	12th	–	–	–	–	–	–	–	–	–	–	–	–	11th		10
Germany	5th	–	3rd	–	2nd	–	5th	–									1st	4th	5th	3rd	1st	1st	3rd	4th	2nd		13
Great Britain	–	1st	–	–	–	2nd	3rd	4th	4th	9th	12th	6th	–	–	3rd	1st	6th	7th	6th	9th	5th	4th	9th	5th	7th		19
Hong Kong	–	–	–	–	–	–	–	–	–	15th	–	–	–	–	–	–	–	–	–	–	–	–	–	–	–		1
Hungary	–	–	–	–	8th	–	–	–	–	–	–	–	–	–	–	–	–	–	–	–	–	–	–	–	–		1
India	–	–	1st	1st	1st	1st	1st	1st	2nd	1st	3rd	3rd	7th	1st	5th	6th	7th	8th	7th	7th	–	12th	8th	3rd	3rd	Q	23
Ireland	2nd	–	–	–	–	–	–	–	–	–	–	–	–	–	–	–	–	–	–	–	–	–	10th	–	10th		3
Italy	–	–	–	–	–	–	11th	–	13th	–	–	–	–	–	–	–	–	–	–	–	–	–	–	–	–		2
Japan	–	–	–	2nd	7th	–	–	–	14th	7th	13th	–	–	–	–	–	–	–	–	–	–	–	–	11th	–		6
Kenya	–	–	–	–	–	–	–	10th	7th	6th	8th	13th	–	–	9th	12th	–	–	–	–	–	–	–	–	–		7
Malaysia	–	–	–	–	–	–	–	9th	–	9th	15th	8th	8th	–	10th	–	9th	11th	11th	–	–	–	–	–	–		9
Mexico	–	–	–	–	–	–	–	–	–	–	16th	16th	–	–	–	–	–	–	–	–	–	–	–	–	–		2
Netherlands	–	–	2nd	–	3rd	3rd	2nd	–	9th	7th	5th	4th	4th	–	6th	3rd	4th	1st	1st	2nd	4th	2nd	4th	6th	1st		20
New Zealand	–	–	–	–	–	–	–	6th	5th	13th	7th	9th	1st	–	7th	–	8th	–	–	6th	7th	9th	7th	9th	12th		14
Pakistan	–	–	–	–	–	4th	4th	2nd	1st	2nd	1st	2nd	3rd	–	1st	5th	3rd	6th	4th	5th	8th	7th	–	–	–		16
Poland	–	–	–	–	–	–	6th	–	12th	–	–	11th	–	4th	–	–	–	–	12th	–	–	–	–	–	–		5
Rhodesia	–	–	–	–	–	–	–	–	–	11th	Defunct																1
Scotland	3rd	Part of Great Britain																									1
Singapore	–	–	–	–	–	–	–	8th	–	–	–	–	–	–	–	–	–	–	–	–	–	–	–	–	–		1
South Africa	–	–	–	–	–	–	–	–	–	–	–	–	–	–	–	–	–	10th	–	10th	12th	11th	–	10th	9th		6
South Korea	–	–	–	–	–	–	–	–	–	–	–	–	–	–	–	10th	–	5th	2nd	8th	6th	8th	–	–	–		6
Soviet Union#	–	–	–	–	–	–	–	–	–	–	–	–	–	3rd	–	7th	Defunct										2
Spain	–	–	7th	–	–	11th	–	–	3rd	4th	6th	7th	6th	2nd	8th	9th	5th	2nd	9th	4th	2nd	6th	5th	8th	4th		19
Switzerland	–	–	7th	–	5th	5th	7th	–	15th	–	–	–	–	–	–	–	–	–	–	–	–	–	–	–	–		5
Tanzania	–	–	–	–	–	–	–	–	–	–	–	–	–	6th	–	–	–	–	–	–	–	–	–	–	–		1
Uganda	–	–	–	–	–	–	–	–	–	–	–	15th	–	–	–	–	–	–	–	–	–	–	–	–	–		1
United States	–	–	–	3rd	11th	11th	–	12th	–	–	–	–	–	–	12th	–	–	12th	–	–	–	–	–	–	–	Q	7
United Team of Germany	–							3rd	7th	5th	Defunct																3
Wales	3rd	Part of Great Britain																									1
West Germany	–										4th	1st	5th	–	2nd	2nd	Defunct										5
Total	6	4	9	3	11	13	12	12	16	15	16	16	11	6	12	12	12	12	12	12	12	12	12	12	12	12	

# = states or teams that have since split into two or more independent teams

=== Debut of teams ===
Year	Debuting teams	No.	CT	Successor or renamed teams
1908	England, France, Germany, Ireland, Scotland, Wales	6	6	
1920	Belgium, Denmark	2	8	Great Britain
1928	Austria, India, Netherlands, Spain, Switzerland	5	13	
1932	Japan, United States	2	15	
1936	Afghanistan, Hungary	2	17	
1948	Argentina, Pakistan	2	19	
1952	Finland, Italy, Poland	3	22	
1956	Australia, Kenya, Malaya, New Zealand, Singapore	5	27	United Team of Germany
1960	No debut	0	27	
1964	Canada, Hong Kong, Rhodesia	3	30	Malaysia
1968	East Germany, Mexico	2	32	West Germany
1972	Uganda	1	33	
1976	None	0	33	
1980	Cuba, Soviet Union, Tanzania	3	36	
1984	None	0	36	
1988	South Korea	1	37	
1992	Egypt	1	38	Germany, CIS
1996	South Africa	1	39	
2000	None	0	39	
2004	None	0	39	
2008	China	1	40	
2012	None	0	40	
2016	Brazil	1	41	
2020	None	0	41	
2024	None	0	41	

== Women ==
=== Results ===
Year	Host	Gold medal match			Bronze medal match			Number of teams
Year	Host	Gold medal	Score	Silver medal	Bronze medal	Score	Fourth place	Number of teams
1980; Details	Moscow, Soviet Union	Zimbabwe	(Note: Round-robin format play in 1980 for women's tournament)	Czechoslovakia	Soviet Union		India	6
1984; Details	Los Angeles, United States	Netherlands	(Note: Round Robin format use in 1984 women's tournament)	West Germany	United States	(10–5); Penalty strokes (Note: The final standings show both the United States and Australia were tied in points and had same margin in goal difference (both having scored 9 goals and conceded 7 goals), therefore a penalty stroke competition was played to decide the bronze medal winner, with the United States winning.)	Australia	6
1988; Details	Seoul, South Korea	Australia	2–0	South Korea	Netherlands	3–1	Great Britain	8
1992; Details	Barcelona, Spain	Spain	2–1 after extra time	Germany	Great Britain	4–3	South Korea	8
1996; Details	Atlanta, United States	Australia	3–1	South Korea	Netherlands	0–0 after extra time (4–3); Penalty strokes	Great Britain	8
2000; Details	Sydney, Australia	Australia	3–1	Argentina	Netherlands	2–0	Spain	10
2004; Details	Athens, Greece	Germany	2–1	Netherlands	Argentina	1–0	China	10
2008; Details	Beijing, China	Netherlands	2–0	China	Argentina	3–1	Germany	12
2012; Details	London, Great Britain	Netherlands	2–0	Argentina	Great Britain	3–1	New Zealand	12
2016; Details	Rio de Janeiro, Brazil	Great Britain	3–3 (2–0); Penalty shootout	Netherlands	Germany	2–1	New Zealand	12
2020; Details	Tokyo, Japan	Netherlands	3–1	Argentina	Great Britain	4–3	India	12
2024; Details	Paris, France	Netherlands	1–1 (3–1); Penalty shootout	China	Argentina	2–2 (3–1); Penalty shootout	Belgium	12
2028; Details	Los Angeles, United States							12
2032; Details	Brisbane, Australia							12

=== Women's medal table ===
Rank	Nation	Gold	Silver	Bronze	Total
1	Netherlands	5	2	3	10
2	Australia	3	0	0	3
3	Germany	1	1	1	3
4	Great Britain	1	0	3	4
5	Spain	1	0	0	1
5	Zimbabwe	1	0	0	1
7	Argentina	0	3	3	6
8	China	0	2	0	2
8	South Korea	0	2	0	2
10	Czechoslovakia	0	1	0	1
10	West Germany	0	1	0	1
12	Soviet Union	0	0	1	1
12	United States	0	0	1	1
Totals (13 entries)		12	12	12	36

=== Top four statistics ===
Team	Winners	Runners-up	Third place	Fourth place
Netherlands	5 (1984, 2008, 2012, 2020, 2024)	2 (2004, 2016)	3 (1988, 1996, 2000)	
Australia	3 (1988, 1996, 2000*)			1 (1984)
Germany (Note: Includes representing West Germany from 1984 to 1988)	1 (2004)	2 (1984, 1992)	1 (2016)	1 (2008)
Great Britain	1 (2016)		3 (1992, 2012*, 2020)	2 (1988, 1996)
Spain	1 (1992*)			1 (2000)
Zimbabwe	1 (1980)			
Argentina		3 (2000, 2012, 2020)	3 (2004, 2008, 2024)	
South Korea		2 (1988*, 1996)		1 (1992)
China		2 (2008*, 2024)		1 (2004)
Czechoslovakia		1 (1980)		
Soviet Union			1 (1980*)	
United States			1 (1984*)	
India				2 (1980, 2020)
New Zealand				2 (2012, 2016)
Belgium				1 (2024)

* = host nation

=== Team appearances ===
Since its debut at the 1980 Games, 23 teams have competed in at least one Olympic Games.

Team	(Soviet Union) 1980	(United States) 1984	(South Korea) 1988	(Spain) 1992	(United States) 1996	(Australia) 2000	(Greece) 2004	(China) 2008	(United Kingdom) 2012	(Brazil) 2016	(Japan) 2020	(France) 2024	(United States) 2028	Total
Argentina	–	–	7th	–	7th	2nd	3rd	3rd	2nd	7th	2nd	3rd		9
Australia	–	4th	1st	5th	1st	1st	5th	5th	5th	6th	5th	5th		11
Austria	5th	–	–	–	–	–	–	–	–	–	–	–		1
Belgium	–	–	–	–	–	–	–	–	11th	–	–	4th		2
Canada	–	5th	6th	7th	–	–	–	–	–	–	–	–		3
China	–	–	–	–	–	5th	4th	2nd	6th	9th	9th	2nd		7
Czechoslovakia#	2nd	–	–	–	Defunct									1
France	–	–	–	–	–	–	–	–	–	–	–	12th		1
Germany	–			2nd	6th	7th	1st	4th	7th	3rd	6th	6th		9
Great Britain	–	–	4th	3rd	4th	8th	–	6th	3rd	1st	3rd	8th		9
India	4th	–	–	–	–	–	–	–	–	12th	4th	–	Q	4
Ireland	–	–	–	–	–	–	–	–	–	–	10th	–		1
Japan	–	–	–	–	–	–	8th	10th	9th	10th	11th	10th		6
Netherlands	–	1st	3rd	6th	3rd	3rd	2nd	1st	1st	2nd	1st	1st	Q	12
New Zealand	–	6th	–	8th	–	6th	6th	12th	4th	4th	8th	–		8
Poland	6th	–	–	–	–	–	–	–	–	–	–	–		1
South Africa	–	–	–	–	–	10th	9th	11th	10th	–	12th	11th		6
South Korea	–	–	2nd	4th	2nd	9th	7th	9th	8th	11th	–	–		8
Soviet Union#	3rd	–	–	Defunct										1
Spain	–	–	–	1st	8th	4th	10th	7th	–	8th	7th	7th		8
United States	–	3rd	8th	–	5th	–	–	8th	12th	5th	–	9th	Q	8
West Germany	–	2nd	5th	Defunct										2
Zimbabwe	1st	–	–	–	–	–	–	–	–	–	–	–		1
Total	6	6	8	8	8	10	10	12	12	12	12	12	12	

# = states or teams that have since split into two or more independent teams

=== Debut of teams ===
Year	Debuting teams	No.	CT	Successor or renamed teams
1980	Austria, Czechoslovakia *, India, Poland, Soviet Union *, Zimbabwe	6	6	
1984	Australia, Canada, Netherlands, New Zealand, United States, West Germany *	6	12	
1988	Argentina, Great Britain, South Korea	3	15	
1992	Spain	1	16	Germany
1996	No debuts	0	16	
2000	China, South Africa	2	18	
2004	No debuts	0	18	
2008	Japan	1	19	
2012	Belgium	1	20	
2016	No debuts	0	20	
2020	Ireland	1	21	
2024	France	1	22	

* = Defunct Team

== Overall medal table ==
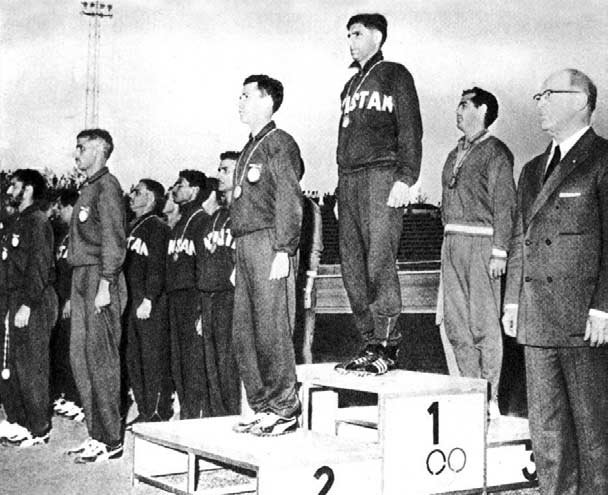
The medal ceremony of the men's tournament at the 1960 Summer Olympics in Rome, Italy

Rank	Nation	Gold	Silver	Bronze	Total
1	Netherlands	8	6	6	20
2	India	8	1	4	13
3	Australia	4	4	5	13
4	Germany	4	3	4	11
5	Great Britain	4	2	7	13
6	Pakistan	3	3	2	8
7	Argentina	1	3	3	7
8	Spain	1	3	1	5
9	West Germany*	1	3	0	4
10	Belgium	1	1	1	3
11	New Zealand	1	0	0	1
11	Zimbabwe	1	0	0	1
13	South Korea	0	3	0	3
14	China	0	2	0	2
15	Czechoslovakia*	0	1	0	1
15	Denmark	0	1	0	1
15	Japan	0	1	0	1
18	Soviet Union*	0	0	2	2
18	United States	0	0	2	2
20	United Team of Germany*	0	0	1	1
Totals (20 entries)		37	37	38	112

* = Defunct Team

== Olympic records ==
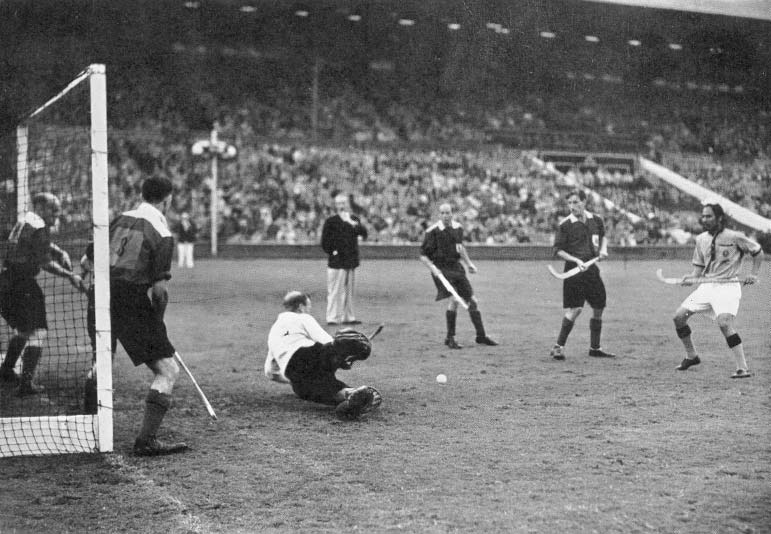
India against Great Britain in the final of the 1948 Olympics

=== Men ===
- Most appearances: India (22)
- Most consecutive appearances : India (18, 1928 Amsterdam – 2004 Athens)
- Most medals: India (13)
- Most titles: India (8)
- Longest winning streak: 30 matches (India, 1928 Amsterdam – 1960 Rome)
- Most goals scored in a single tournament : India (43, 1980 Moscow)
- Fewest goals conceded in a single tournament: India (nil, 1928 Amsterdam, 1956 Melbourne)
- Biggest margin of victory: India 24–1 United States (1932 Los Angeles)
- Biggest margin of victory at an Olympic final: India 8–1 Germany (1936 Berlin)
- Most appearances by a player: Teun de Nooijer (Netherlands), Ric Charlesworth (Australia), David Alegre and Pol Amat (Spain) (5 appearances)
- Most goals scored by a player in a match: Roop Singh (India, 10 goals vs United States at 1932 Los Angeles)
- Most goals scored by a player in an Olympic final: Balbir Singh Sr. (India, 5 goals vs Netherlands at 1952 Helsinki)

=== Women ===
- Most appearances: Australia and Netherlands (11)
- Most consecutive appearances: Australia and Netherlands (11, 1980 Moscow – 2024 Paris)
- Most medals: Netherlands (10)
- Most titles: Netherlands (5)
- Most goals scored: Netherlands (192)
- Most goals scored in a single tournament: Netherlands (29, 2020 Tokyo)
- Most appearances by a player: Natascha Keller (Germany, 5 appearances)
- Most goals by a player: Maartje Paumen (Netherlands, 19 goals)
- Most goals scored by a player in a single tournament: Maartje Paumen (Netherlands, 11 goals at 2008 Beijing)

== See also ==
- List of Olympic venues in field hockey
