= FIH Men's World Ranking =

Field hockey world ranking list

The FIH Men's World Ranking is a ranking system for men's national teams in field hockey. The teams of the member nations of International Hockey Federation (FIH), field hockey's world governing body, are ranked based on their game results and performance. The rankings were introduced in October 2003.

== Current rankings ==
Men's Rankings from 6 November 2026
Rank	Change	Team	Points
1	Steady	Germany	3720.42
2	Steady	Belgium	3692.9
3	Steady	Australia	3583.25
4	Steady	Argentina	3512.35
5	Steady	Netherlands	3481.3
6	Steady	Spain	3473.06
7	Steady	England	3431.57
8	Steady	India	3173.13
9	Steady	New Zealand	2965.89
10	Steady	France	2841.88
11	Steady	Ireland	2645.55
12	Steady	Pakistan	2555.59
13	Steady	South Africa	2531.46
14	▲1	Malaysia	2526.03
15	▲2	Japan	2412.1
16	▼2	Scotland	2371.44
17	▼1	Egypt	2308.99
18	Steady	Wales	2299.73
19	Steady	Canada	2200.09
20	▲3	South Korea	2136.03
21	Steady	Poland	2123.93
22	▼2	China	2106.99
23	▲1	Chile	2102.16
24	▼2	Austria	2072.79
25	▲1	Italy	1976.13
26	▲1	United States	1960.11
27	▲2	Russia	1842.77
28	Steady	Bangladesh	1804
29	▲1	Czech Republic	1782.15
30	▲1	Mexico	1775.16
31	▼6	Oman	1773.31
32	Steady	Ukraine	1769.33
33	Steady	Ghana	1722.31
34	Steady	Brazil	1715.81
35	Steady	Nigeria	1700.42
36	Steady	Trinidad and Tobago	1677.28
37	Steady	Cuba	1652.61
38	Steady	Sri Lanka	1650.99
39	Steady	Switzerland	1628.61
40	Steady	Belarus	1622.58
41	Steady	Venezuela	1567.43
42	Steady	Croatia	1566.45
43	▲5	Thailand	1517.42
44	▼1	Dominican Republic	1512.72
45	▼1	Turkey	1507.07
46	▼1	Finland	1479.76
47	Steady	Chinese Taipei	1470.86
48	▲1	Kenya	1445.77
49	▲1	Gibraltar	1442.77
50	▲4	Singapore	1438.15
51	▲5	Uruguay	1434.3
52	▼1	Hong Kong	1433.98
53	▼1	Lithuania	1424.82
54	▼1	Slovakia	1423.57
55	▼9	Uzbekistan	1421.14
56	▼1	Barbados	1419.44
57	Steady	Papua New Guinea	1416
58	▲1	Portugal	1397.09
59	▲1	Cyprus	1397
60	▲1	Puerto Rico	1391.34
61	▲1	Solomon Islands	1384
62	▲1	Guatemala	1375.02
63	▲1	Tonga	1375
64	▲1	Vanuatu	1374
65	▲1	Jamaica	1373.48
66	▲1	Afghanistan	1365
67	▲1	Brunei	1364.44
68	▲1	Fiji	1364
69	▲1	Namibia	1361.08
70	▲1	Myanmar	1357.97
71	▲1	Kazakhstan	1355.46
72	▲2	Samoa	1348
73	▲2	Norway	1347.16
74	▲2	Nepal	1325
75	▲2	Vietnam	1314.14
76	▲2	Panama	1313.88
77	▲2	Qatar	1310
78	▲2	Malta	1307.69
79	▼6	Peru	1295.87
80	▲1	Slovenia	1292.88
81	▲1	Costa Rica	1290.72
82	▲1	Bolivia	1285.15
83	▼25	Indonesia	1284.67
84	Steady	Macau	1263.21
85	Steady	Guyana	1255.3
86	Steady	Hungary	1251.73
87	Steady	Ecuador	1240.46
88	Steady	Uganda	1236.94
89	Steady	Zimbabwe	1236.73
90	Steady	Zambia	1214.09
91	Steady	Paraguay	1183.9
92	Steady	Iran	1178.89
93	Steady	Bermuda	1160.6
94	Steady	El Salvador	895.01
95	Steady	Serbia	855.58
96	Steady	Malawi	753.92
97	Steady	Cambodia	697.1
98	Steady	Tajikistan	651.63
99	Steady	Kyrgyzstan	541.85
100	Steady	Luxembourg	464.82
101	Steady	Eswatini	383.33
102	Steady	Bulgaria	380
103	Steady	Greece	104
104	Steady	Morocco	93.01
*Change from 31 August 2026

== Uses of the rankings ==
The rankings were introduced to overcome the criticism of fixing when drawing the pools for each tournament. It also determines the quotas for tournaments such as the Olympic Games and the World Cup.

== Calculation method ==
=== Overview ===
All of the FIH-recognised, including qualifying and continental matches played in last four years are included in ranking points calculation. However, the past results will be deducted by the percentage set by the FIH as shown by the tabulation below:

Year	Points percentage included
Year 4	100%
Year 3	75%
Year 2	50%
Year 1	25%
Total points

=== Continental championships method ===
FIH had set allocated ranking points for all the continental tournaments. However, a different percentage of points for every continent raised questions about the system. Only Europe had full 100% points allocation for all classifications while the others had only several finishers with full points allocation. Africa was the sole continent with neither men's or women's tournaments having full points allocation regardless of the classifications.

=== New calculation method ===
From 2020 onwards, the FIH rolled out a new match-based world rankings system similar to the ones being used in rugby union and association football.

== Rank leaders ==
Men's at the end of each year
Year	Team
Present	Germany
2025	Netherlands
2024	Netherlands
2023	Netherlands
2022	Australia
2021	Australia
2020	Belgium
2019	Australia
2018	Belgium
2017	Australia
2016	Australia
2015	Australia
2014	Australia
2013	Australia
2012	Germany
2011	Australia
2010	Australia
2009	Germany
2008	Germany
2007	Germany
2006	Germany
2005	Australia
2004	Germany
2003	Germany

Men's Leaderboard
Team	Years
Australia	11
Germany	7
Netherlands	3
Belgium	2

== See also ==
- FIH Women's World Ranking
