= Helsinki Velodrome =

Sports venue in Helsinki, Finland

- Helsingin Velodromi
- Velo
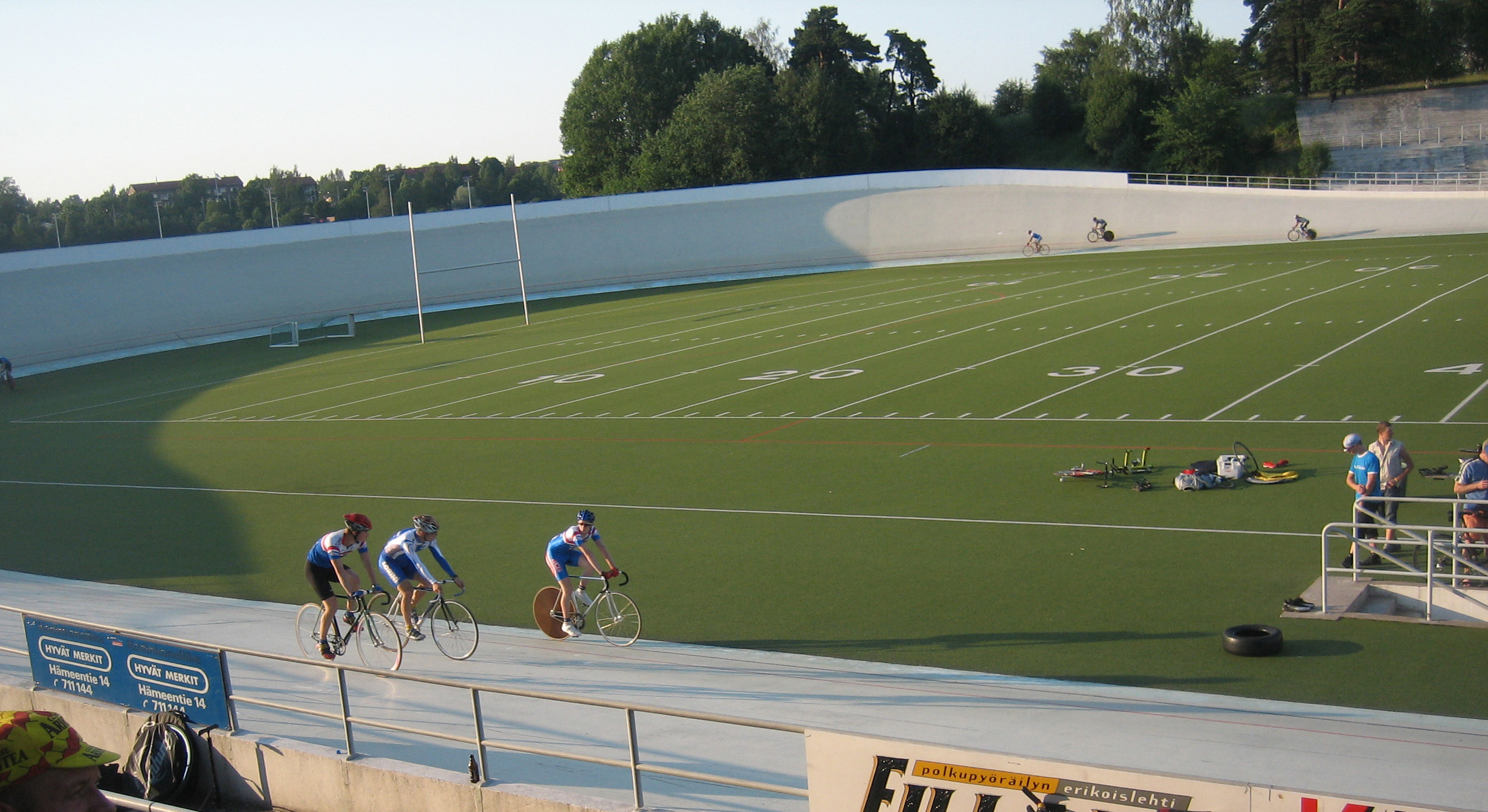
- Helsinki Velodrome
- Interactive map of Helsinki Velodrome
- Address: Mäkelänkatu 70, 00520 Helsinki
- Coordinates: 60°12′10″N 24°56′34″E
- Owner: City of Helsinki
- Seating type: Seated and standing
- Capacity: Seated: 4000; Standing: 3000
- Surface: Pitch: Artificial turf (Installed in 2000); Cycling track: Concrete
- Field shape: Rectangular
- Public transit: Helsinki Regional Transport Authority bus and tram service

Construction
- Groundbreaking: 1938
- Built: 1940
- Opened: 22 May 1941
- Renovated: 1997-2000 (3.5 mil. €)
- Architect: Hilding Ekelund

Tenants
- American football: Helsinki Roosters; Helsinki 69ers Helsinki Wolverines; GS Demons; East City Giants; Cycling: Cycle Club Helsinki; IK-32; Field hockey: Warriors HC; ABC-Team

Website
- www.myhelsinki.fi/en/see-and-do/activities/velodrome

Helsinki Velodrome (Finnish: Helsingin Velodromi) is an outdoor velodrome, American football and field hockey stadium in Helsinki, Finland. The protected functionalist concrete building was designed by Hilding Ekelund.

== History ==
It was built in 1938–1940 for the 1940 Summer Olympics which were cancelled due to World War II. After the war, it was a venue of the 1952 Summer Olympics for the track cycling and field hockey events. The Velodrome hosted the four-track cycling events and the whole field hockey event for the Olympics. The original building was deemed inadequate during the games and additional space was quickly erected to accommodate the athletes and press. Some temporary seating was also constructed for additional capacity.

Before the renovation of 1997–2000, the center area had a natural grass pitch and was used for soccer, hosting local teams like Ponnistus, Käpylän Pallo and Atlantis FC.

Docomomo has listed it as a significant example of modern architecture in Finland.

== Usage ==
=== Cycling ===
The cycling track is 400 meters in length and is used for most national events. The banking in the bends is 37.5˚ and 16˚ on the straights. The length of the track and the lack of built safety measures make the track unsuitable for international cycling competitions.

Helsinki Velodrome also acts as a starting and ending point for the annual cyclosportive Tour de Helsinki.

=== American football ===
The Helsinki Velodrome is the home field of most American football teams in Helsinki, including East City Giants and the Vaahteraliiga teams Helsinki Roosters and Helsinki Wolverines. The ground also caters to lacrosse and field hockey players.

In 2010 a training pitch designated primarily for American football was opened in the near vicinity of the Helsinki Velodrome, making the area an unofficial American football center of Helsinki.

=== Field hockey ===
During the summer season the field is used for playing field hockey. In 2022, the men's EuroHockey Junior Championship III was hosted at the Helsinki Velodrome.

=== Speedway ===
The velodrome previously hosted some motorcycle speedway meetings. It staged a qualifying round of the Speedway World Championship in 1956 and from 1959 to 1961 in addition to the Finnish Individual Speedway Championship in 1955 and 1957. The speedway rider Erkki Ala-Sippola was killed at the venue during a Finnish Speedway Championship match there in 1958.
