= European Hockey Federation =

European field hockey governing body

EuroHockey
- Jurisdiction: Europe
- Membership: 44 member associations
- Abbreviation: EHF
- Founded: 1969; 57 years ago
- Affiliation: International Hockey Federation
- Headquarters: Brussels, Belgium
- President: (Spain) Marcos Hofmann

Official website
- eurohockey.org

EuroHockey is a European sports federation for field hockey, based in Brussels. It is the umbrella organisation for all European national federations, and organises the Euro Hockey League. The president of the league is Marcos Hofmann. In reaction to the 2022 Russian invasion of Ukraine, the European Hockey Federation banned the participation of all Russian and Belarusian athletes and officials from all events sanctioned by the Federation.

== Members association ==
Highlighted are the countries that are part of the European Hockey Federation. Members Countries that are also part of the Great Britain team Suspended

- Armenia
- Austria
- Azerbaijan (Note: Suspended since 12 November 2016)
- Belarus
- Belgium
- Bulgaria
- Croatia
- Cyprus
- (Czech Republic) Czechia
- Denmark
- England
- Estonia
- Finland
- France
- (Georgia (country)) Georgia
- Germany
- Gibraltar
- Greece
- (United Kingdom) Great Britain (Note: Adherent members in International Hockey Federation)
- Hungary
- Ireland
- Israel
- Italy
- Lithuania
- Luxembourg
- Malta
- Moldova
- Netherlands
- North Macedonia
- Norway
- Poland
- Portugal
- Romania
- Russia
- Scotland
- Serbia
- Slovakia
- Slovenia
- Spain
- Sweden
- Switzerland
- (Turkey) Türkiye
- Ukraine
- Wales

== Outdoor EHF competitions ==
=== Clubs ===
- Euro Hockey League
- Women's Euro Hockey League
- Men's EuroHockey Club Trophy I
- Men's EuroHockey Club Trophy II
- Women's EuroHockey Club Trophy
- Men's EuroHockey Club Challenge
- Women's EuroHockey Club Challenge

==== Defunct ====
- EuroHockey Club Champions Cup
- EuroHockey Club Champions Cup (women)
- EuroHockey Cup Winners Cup
- EuroHockey Cup Winners Trophy
- EuroHockey Cup Winners Challenge

=== National teams ===
- Men's EuroHockey Championship
- Women's EuroHockey Championship
- Men's EuroHockey Championship II
- Women's EuroHockey Championship II
- Men's EuroHockey Championship III
- Women's EuroHockey Championship III
- EuroHockey Championship IV
- Men's EuroHockey Junior Championship (U21)
- Women's EuroHockey Junior Championship (U21)
- EuroHockey Youth Championship (U18)
- EuroHockey U16 Championship (U16)
- EuroHockey 5s U16 Championship
- Men's EuroHockey5s Championship
- Women's EuroHockey5s Championship
- Southeast European Hockey 5's Championship - Boys & Girls U15

==== Defunct ====
- Pannonia Cup
- Celtic Cup
- Junior Celtic Cup
- Alps Cup
- Nordic Championships

== Indoor EHF competitions ==
=== Clubs ===
- Men's EuroHockey Indoor Club Cup
- Women's EuroHockey Indoor Club Cup
- EuroHockey Indoor Club Trophy
- EuroHockey Indoor Club Challenge

=== National teams ===
- Men's EuroHockey Indoor Championship
- Women's EuroHockey Indoor Championship
- Men's EuroHockey Indoor Championship II
- Women's EuroHockey Indoor Championship II
- EuroHockey Indoor Junior Championship

== Medals ==
=== National Events ===
Last Update: 25 February 2024

1. Men's EuroHockey Championship (1970-2023) - 19 Editions
2. Women's EuroHockey Championship (1984-2023) - 16 Editions
3. Men's EuroHockey Junior Championship (U21) (1976-2022) - 20 Editions
4. Women's EuroHockey Junior Championship (U21) (1977-2022) - 20 Editions
5. EuroHockey Youth Championship (U18) (Men) (2002-2023) - 12 Editions
6. EuroHockey Youth Championship (U18) (Women) (2002-2023) - 12 Editions
7. Men's EuroHockey Indoor Championship (1974-2024) - 21 Editions
8. Women's EuroHockey Indoor Championship (1975-2024) - 22 Editions
9. EuroHockey5s Championship (Men) (2022) - 1 Editions
10. EuroHockey5s Championship (Women) (2022) - 1 Editions
11. EuroHockey U16 Championship (U16) (Men) (2003-2014) - 7 Editions
12. EuroHockey5s U16 Championship (U16) (Men) (2017-2022) - 3 Editions
13. EuroHockey U16 Championship (U16) (Women) (2003-2014) - 7 Editions
14. EuroHockey5s U16 Championship (U16) (Women) (2017-2022) - 3 Editions

Rank	Nation	Gold	Silver	Bronze	Total
1	Germany (GER)	70	37	21	128
2	Netherlands (NED)	62	39	26	127
3	Spain (ESP)	8	16	23	47
4	Austria (AUT)	6	4	7	17
5	Belgium (BEL)	5	21	15	41
6	England (ENG)	4	20	32	56
7	Poland (POL)	2	9	5	16
8	Russia (RUS)	2	4	5	11
9	Ukraine (UKR)	2	2	4	8
10	Belarus (BLR)	1	2	4	7
10	France (FRA)	1	2	4	7
12	Ireland (IRE)	1	2	3	6
13	Czech Republic (CZE)	0	3	3	6
14	Switzerland (SUI)	0	1	4	5
15	Scotland (SCO)	0	1	3	4
16	Lithuania (LTU)	0	1	0	1
17	Turkey (TUR)	0	0	2	2
18	Canada (CAN)	0	0	1	1
18	Denmark (DEN)	0	0	1	1
18	Italy (ITA)	0	0	1	1
Totals (20 entries)		164	164	164	492

- Soviet Union+Russia / Czechoslovakia+Czech Republic
- Canada - 1981 Women's EuroHockey Indoor Championship.

=== Club Events ===
Last Update: 2 March 2024

1. EuroHockey Club Champions Cup (1974-2007) - 34 Editions
2. Euro Hockey League (2007-2024) - 16 Editions
3. EuroHockey Club Champions Cup (women) (1974-2019) - 46 Editions
4. Women's Euro Hockey League (2021-2024) - 4 Editions
5. Men's EuroHockey Indoor Club Cup (1990-2024) - 33 Editions
6. Women's EuroHockey Indoor Club Cup (1974-2024) - 32 Editions

Rank	=	Gold	Silver	Bronze	Total
1	Germany (GER)	83	41	27	151
2	Netherlands (NED)	65	33	41	139
3	England (ENG)	5	11	13	29
4	Spain (ESP)	4	29	26	59
5	Russia (RUS)	3	9	7	19
6	Poland (POL)	2	4	3	9
7	Belgium (BEL)	1	9	9	19
8	Switzerland (SUI)	1	0	4	5
9	Sweden (SWE)	1	0	1	2
10	Belarus (BLR)	0	8	4	12
11	Scotland (SCO)	0	6	7	13
12	Austria (AUT)	0	6	5	11
13	Ukraine (UKR)	0	3	6	9
14	France (FRA)	0	1	5	6
15	Czech Republic (CZE)	0	1	3	4
16	Azerbaijan (AZE)	0	1	1	2
16	Croatia (CRO)	0	1	1	2
16	Denmark (DEN)	0	1	1	2
19	Turkey (TUR)	0	1	0	1
20	Ireland	0	0	1	1
20	Lithuania (LTU)	0	0	1	1
Totals (21 entries)		165	165	166	496

- One bronze medal shared in 2013 EuroHockey Club Champions Cup.
- Soviet Union+Russia / Czechoslovakia+Czech Republic

== National team rankings ==
Men's FIH Rankings as of 5 August 2026
EHF	FIH	Change	Team	Points
1	1	Steady	Belgium	3838.25
2	2	Steady	Netherlands	3613.06
3	3	Steady	England	3599.34
4	5	Steady	Germany	3406.2
5	6	Steady	Spain	3296.83
6	9	Steady	France	2795.56
7	10	Steady	Ireland	2795.27
8	15	▲1	Wales	2428.82
9	17	Steady	Scotland	2371.44
10	21	Steady	Poland	2123.93
11	22	▲2	Austria	2072.66
12	27	Steady	Italy	1969.3
13	29	Steady	Russia	1842.77
14	30	Steady	Czech Republic	1782.15
15	32	Steady	Ukraine	1769.33
16	39	▼1	Switzerland	1628.61
17	40	▼1	Belarus	1622.58
18	42	▼1	Croatia	1566.45
19	44	Steady	Turkey	1507.07
20	45	Steady	Finland	1479.76
21	50	▲2	Gibraltar	1442.77
22	52	▲3	Lithuania	1424.82
23	53	▲3	Slovakia	1423.57
24	59	▲2	Portugal	1397.09
25	60	▲2	Cyprus	1397
26	75	Steady	Norway	1347.16
27	77	Steady	Malta	1314.52
28	81	Steady	Slovenia	1292.88
29	87	Steady	Hungary	1251.73
30	95	Steady	Serbia	855.58
31	100	Steady	Luxembourg	464.82
Change from 12 July 2026

Women's FIH Rankings as of 4 August 2026
EHF	FIH	Change	Team	Points
1	1	Steady	Netherlands	4103.99
2	3	Steady	Belgium	3369.8
3	5	Steady	Germany	3163.12
4	6	Steady	Spain	3103.8
5	7	Steady	England	2957.83
6	12	Steady	Ireland	2502.29
7	14	Steady	Scotland	2407.56
8	16	Steady	France	2094.21
9	19	Steady	Italy	1995.37
10	22	Steady	Belarus	1803.25
11	23	Steady	Russia	1791.53
12	24	Steady	Wales	1782.86
13	25	Steady	Poland	1704.83
14	28	Steady	Ukraine	1637.59
15	29	Steady	Czech Republic	1606.34
16	31	▼1	Austria	1588.14
17	35	Steady	Switzerland	1400.34
18	36	Steady	Turkey	1395.93
19	51	▲1	Lithuania	1191.44
20	55	▲1	Hungary	1176.23
21	58	Steady	Slovenia	1145.9
22	68	▲2	Croatia	1079.32
23	71	▲2	Slovakia	1058.02
24	74	Steady	Portugal	1019.53
25	81	▼1	Gibraltar	695.21
26	83	Steady	Luxembourg	552.95
27	88	Steady	Finland	72.59
Change from 25 July 2026
