= Field hockey at the Mediterranean Games =

Mediterranean games (field hockey)

Field hockey at the Mediterranean Games has been played consistently since 1955 for men until 1979. The Spain national team was the most successful men's team.

== Men's tournaments ==
Year	Host	Gold medal game			Bronze medal game (or third place)		
Year	Host	Gold medalist	Score	Silver medalist	Bronze medalist	Score	Fourth place
1955; Details	(Spain); Barcelona	Spain	^{n/a}	Egypt	France	^{n/a}	Italy
1963; Details	(Italy); Naples	United Arab Republic	^{n/a}	Spain	Italy	^{n/a}	Yugoslavia
1979; Details	(Socialist Federal Republic of Yugoslavia); Split	Yugoslavia	^{n/a}	Spain	Italy	^{n/a}	France

=== Men's medal table ===
Rank	Nation	Gold	Silver	Bronze	Total
1	Spain	1	2	0	3
2	Egypt	1	1	0	2
3	Yugoslavia	1	0	0	1
4	Italy	0	0	2	2
5	France	0	0	1	1
Totals (5 entries)		3	3	3	9

== See also ==
- Field hockey at the Summer Olympics
- Field hockey at the Summer Universiade
