= Lisette Sevens =

Dutch field hockey player

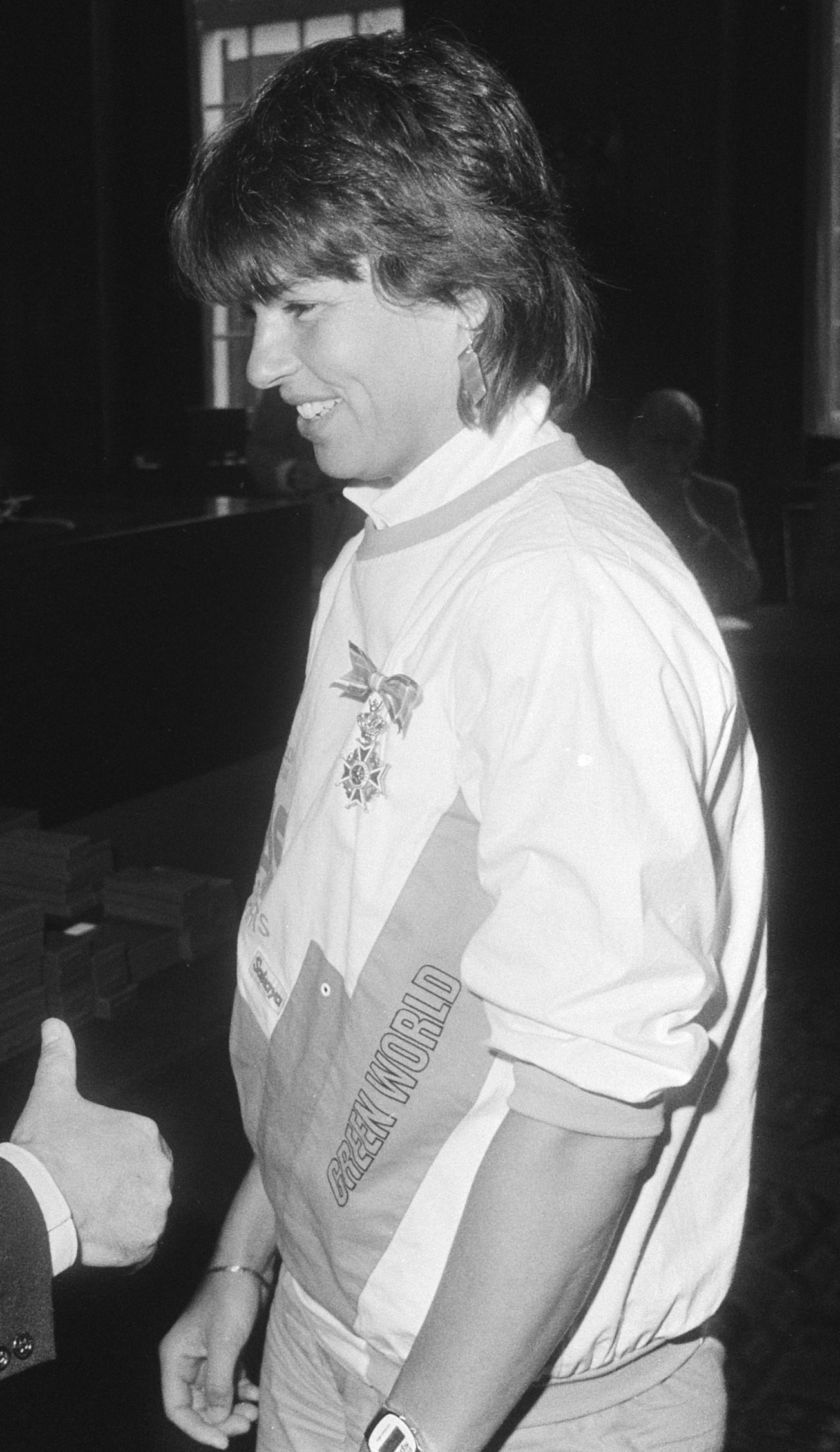
- Lisette Sevens in 1983

Personal information
- Born: Elisabeth Anthonius Maria Ignatius Sevens; 29 June 1949 (age 77) Helmond, the Netherlands
- Height: 1.69 m (5 ft 7 in)
- Weight: 61 kg (134 lb)

Sport
- Sport: Field hockey
- Club: AH&BC, Amsterdam
Medal record
Representing the Netherlands
Olympic Games
Gold medal – first place	1984 Los Angeles	Team competition
World Cup
Gold medal – first place	1974 Mandelieu	Team
Bronze medal – third place	1976 Berlin	Team
Gold medal – first place	1978 Madrid	Team
Silver medal – second place	1981 Buenos Aires	Team
Gold medal – first place	1983 Kuala Lumpur	Team
EuroHockey Nations Championship
Gold medal – first place	1984 Lille	Team

Elisabeth "Lisette" Anthonius Maria Ignatius Sevens (born 29 June 1949) is a retired Dutch field hockey defender, who won the gold medal at the 1984 Summer Olympics.

From 1974 to 1984, she played a total number of 125 international matches for Holland, in which she scored five goals. Sevens retired from international field hockey after the 1984 Summer Olympics in Los Angeles, California, where she captained the team.
