= Czechoslovakia national field hockey team =

Czechoslovakia national field hockey team may refer to:

- Czechoslovakia men's national field hockey team
- Czechoslovakia women's national field hockey team
