= Toos Bax =

Dutch field hockey player

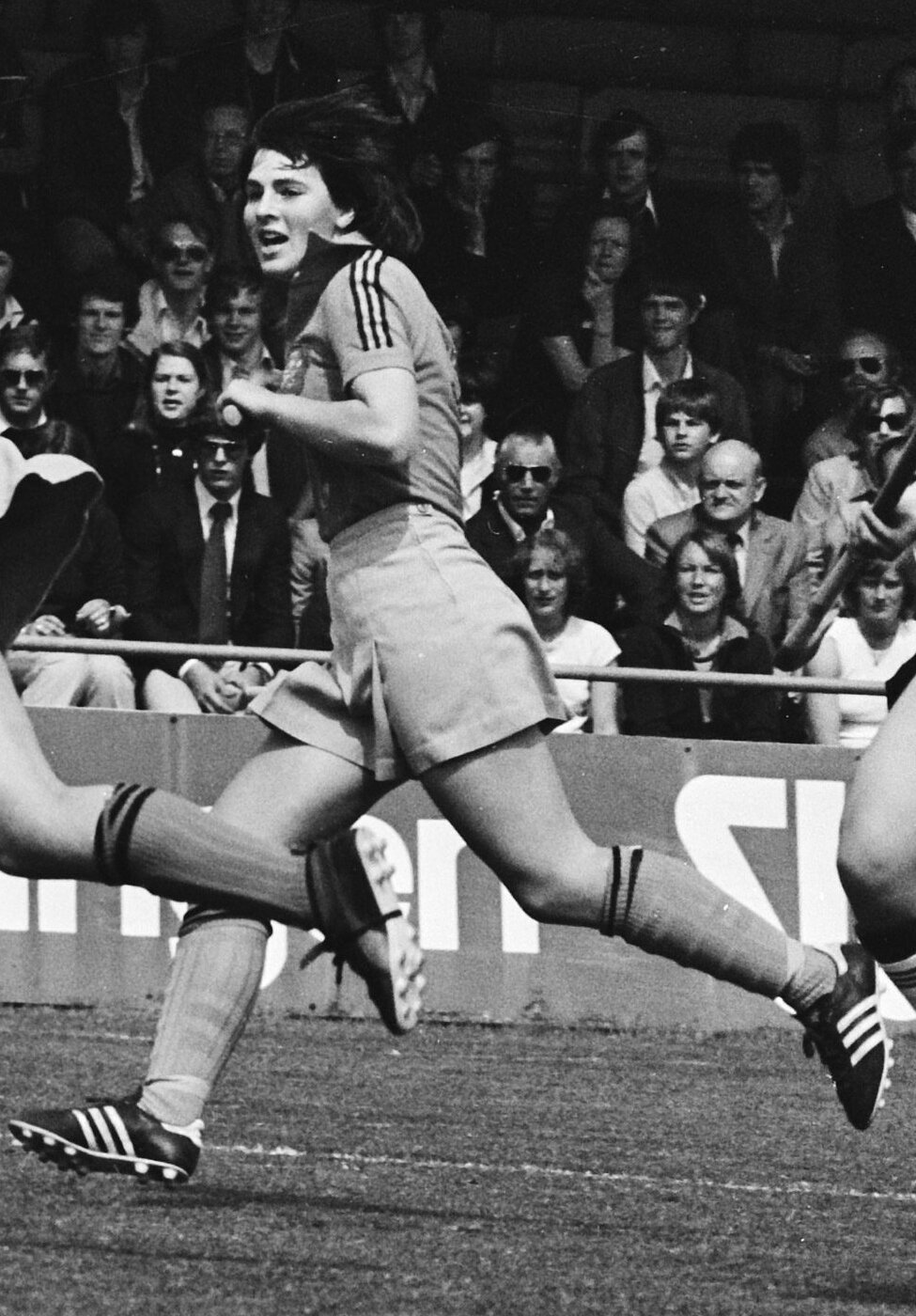
- International Netherlands against Germany, 1 May 1978

Personal information
- Born: 27 July 1947 (age 79) Amsterdam

Sport
- Sport: Field hockey
- Position: Midfielder
National team
Years	Team	Caps	Goals
1971-1981	Netherlands	103	(47)
Medal record
Women's field hockey
Representing the Netherlands
World Cup
Gold medal – first place	1974 Mandelieu
Bronze medal – third place	1976 West Berlin
Gold medal – first place	1978 Madrid
Silver medal – second place	1981 Buenos Aires

Toos Bax (born 27 June 1947 in Amsterdam) is a Dutch former field hockey player. She won the world championships with the Netherlands team in 1974 and 1978.

== International career ==
Toos Bax made 103 appearances for the Netherlands national team from 1972 to 1981. The midfielder scored 45 international goals.

Toos Bax took part in the first official Women's World Cup in 1974. The Netherlands finished second behind the Indian team in the preliminary round and defeated the Germans 1–0 in the semi-finals. The Netherlands team won the title by beating Argentina 1–0 in the final. At the 1976 World Cup, the Netherlands won the bronze medal after losing to Argentina on penalties in the semifinals. Two years later at the 1978 World Cup in Madrid, the Netherlands won all four games in their preliminary group and defeated the Belgian team 6–0 in the semifinals. In the final, they beat the Germans 1–0 with a goal from Toos Bax. At the end of her international career, Bax took part in the 1981 World Cup in Buenos Aires. The Netherlands reached the final undefeated, where they lost to the Germans in a penalty shoot-out.

In 1979 Bax, as in 1975, also took part in the World Championship of the International Federation of Women's Hockey Associations (IFWHA), which was held in Vancouver in 1979. The Netherlands women won the title in this competitive event of the Fédération Internationale de Hockey (FIH) World Cup.
