= 1974 Women's Hockey World Cup =

International field hockey competition

1974 Women's FIH Hockey World Cup
Tournament details
- Host country: France
- City: Mandelieu
- Dates: 17–24 March
- Teams: 10 (from 3 confederations)

Final positions
- Champions: Netherlands (1st title)
- Runner-up: Argentina
- Third place: West Germany

Tournament statistics
- Matches played: 29
- Goals scored: 88 (3.03 per match)

The 1974 Women's Hockey World Cup was the inaugural edition of the Women's Hockey World Cup. It took place from 17 to 24 March in Mandelieu, France. The Netherlands won the title defeating Argentina in the final on 24 March.

== Results ==
=== Preliminary round ===
==== Pool A ====
Pos	Team	Pld	W	D	L	GF	GA	GD	Pts	Qualification
1	India	4	3	0	1	8	3	+5	6	Semi-finals
2	Netherlands	4	3	0	1	5	1	+4	6	Semi-finals
3	Belgium	4	2	1	1	5	2	+3	5	
4	Spain	4	1	1	2	6	6	0	3	
5	Mexico	4	0	0	4	1	13	−12	0	

Source: FIH
Rules for classification: 1) points; 2) goal difference; 3) goals scored; 4) head-to-head result.

17 March 1974
15:00

Netherlands	2–0	Spain
	Report

Umpires:
E. Farke (FRG)
Elsa Viala (FRA)

17 March 1974
17:00

Belgium	2–0	India
	Report

Umpires:
Angela Larío (ESP)
Annie Boissonnet (FRA)

18 March 1974
11:00

Belgium	0–1	Netherlands
	Report

Umpires:
M. Gölze (FRG)
Ingeborg Grüner (FRG)

18 March 1974
13:00

India	3–0	Mexico
Saini ?', ?'; Bhullar ?'	Report

Umpires:
Sophie Molendijk (NED)
M. Bruyneel (BEL)

19 March 1974
15:00

Mexico	1–3	Belgium
	Report

Umpires:
E. Rodríguez (ARG)
P. Blanchard (ESP)

19 March 1974
17:00

Spain	1–4	India
	Report	Bhatti ?'; Chauhan ?'; Mascarenhas ?'

Umpires:
B. Frank (FRG)
E. Farke (FRG)

20 March 1974
11:00

Spain	0–0	Belgium
	Report

Umpires:
G. Völkers (NED)
Sophia Molendijk (NED)

20 March 1974
13:00

Netherlands	2–0	Mexico
	Report

Umpires:
G. Kedinger (ARG)
E. Rodríguez (ARG)

21 March 1974
15:00

Mexico	0–5	Spain
	Report

Umpires:
Annie Boissonnet (FRA)
M. Gölze (FRG)

21 March 1974
17:00

India	1–0	Netherlands
Bhatti ?'	Report

Umpires:
V. Weber (FRG)
E. Farke (FRG)

==== Pool B ====
Pos	Team	Pld	W	D	L	GF	GA	GD	Pts	Qualification
1	West Germany	4	4	0	0	15	3	+12	8	Semi-finals
2	Argentina	4	3	0	1	19	4	+15	6	Semi-finals
3	France (H)	4	2	0	2	7	5	+2	4	
4	Austria	4	1	0	3	2	15	−13	2	
5	Switzerland	4	0	0	4	2	18	−16	0	

Source: FIH
Rules for classification: 1) points; 2) goal difference; 3) goals scored; 4) head-to-head result.
(H) Hosts

17 March 1974
11:00

France	3–1	Switzerland
	Report

Umpires:
B. Frank (FRG)
V. Weber (FRG)

17 March 1974
13:00

West Germany	4–2	Argentina
	Report

Umpires:
G. Völkers (NED)
P. Blanchard (ESP)

18 March 1974
15:00

Switzerland	0–2	Austria
	Report

Umpires:
G. Kedinger (ARG)
E. Rodríguez (ESP)

18 March 1974
17:00

Argentina	3–0	France
	Report

Umpires:
M. Ernst (NED)
R. Spits (NED)

19 March 1974
11:00

Switzerland	1–6	West Germany
	Report

Umpires:
Elsa Viala (FRA)
M. Bruyneel (BEL)

19 March 1974
13:00

Austria	0–4	France
	Report

Umpires:
Sophia Molendijk (NED)
M. Armstrong (NED)

20 March 1974
15:00

France	0–1	West Germany
	Report

Umpires:
P. Blanchard (ESP)
Angela Larío (ESP)

20 March 1974
17:00

Austria	0–6	Argentina
	Report

Umpires:
M. Ernst (NED)
R. Spits (NED)

21 March 1974
11:00

Argentina	8–0	Switzerland
	Report

Umpires:
P. Blanchard (ESP)
M. Armstrong (NED)

21 March 1974
13:00

West Germany	5–0	Austria
	Report

Umpires:
M. Bruyneel (BEL)
Angela Larío (ESP)

=== Classification round ===
==== Ninth and tenth place ====
23 March 1974
11:00

Mexico	1–1 (a.e.t.)	Switzerland
	Report
Penalties
	0–1

Umpires:
Elsa Viala (FRA)
Ingeborg Grüner (FRG)

==== Fifth to eighth place classification ====
Crossover
23 March 1974
Belgium	6
Austria	0
23 March 1974
France	0
Spain	2

Fifth Place
24 March 1974
Belgium	2
Spain	0
Seventh Place
24 March 1974
Austria	0
France	1

===== Crossover =====
23 March 1974
13:00

Belgium	6–0	Austria
	Report

Umpires:
M. Ernst (NED)
P. Blanchard (ESP)

23 March 1974
15:00

France	0–2	Spain
	Report

Umpires:
E. Farke (FRG)
M. Bruyneel (BEL)

===== Seventh and eighth place =====
24 March 1974
11:00

Austria	0–1	France
	Report

Umpires:
B. Frank (FRG)
R. Spits (NED)

===== Fifth and sixth place =====
24 March 1974
13:00

Belgium	2–0	Spain
	Report

Umpires:
G. Kedinger (ARG)
G. E. Völkers (NED)

==== First to fourth place classification ====
Semifinals
22 March 1974
India	0
Argentina	1
22 March 1974
West Germany	0
Netherlands	1

Final
24 March 1974
Argentina	0
Netherlands	1
Third Place
24 March 1974
India	0
West Germany	2

===== Semi-finals =====
22 March 1974
13:00

West Germany	0–1	Netherlands
	Report	De Wilde 48'

Umpires:
E. Rodríguez (ARG)
Angela Larío (ESP)

22 March 1974
15:00

India	0–1	Argentina
	Report	Alfonso ?'

Umpires:
Sophia Molendijk (NED)
V. Weber (FRG)

===== Third and fourth place =====
24 March 1974
15:00

India	0–2	West Germany
	Report	Drescher ?'; Klimpel-Raabe ?'

Umpires:
Sophia Molendijk (NED)
E. Rodríguez (ARG)

===== Final =====
24 March 1974
17:00

Argentina	0–1	Netherlands
	Report	Van Kollenburg 29'

Umpires:
M. Bruyneel (BEL)
Angela Larío (ESP)

=== Winning Squad ===
Netherlands

- Anneke Bax
- Toos Bax
- Suzan Bekker
- Cora de Wilde
- Marja Hagemans
- Helma Hoegen
- Wilma Koopman
- Debbie Kreft
- Loes Leurs
- Jose Poelmans
- Lisette Sevens
- Marjo van Straten
- Nel van Kollenburg
- Nicole van Lierop
- Tanja van Ossterhout

== Statistics ==
=== Final standings ===
As per statistical convention in field hockey, matches decided in extra time are counted as wins and losses, while matches decided by penalty shoot-outs are counted as draws.

Pos	Grp	Team	Pld	W	D	L	GF	GA	GD	Pts	Final result
1st place, gold medalist(s)	A	Netherlands	6	5	0	1	7	1	+6	15	Gold Medal
2nd place, silver medalist(s)	B	Argentina	6	4	0	2	20	5	+15	12	Silver Medal
3rd place, bronze medalist(s)	B	West Germany	6	5	0	1	17	4	+13	15	Bronze Medal
4	A	India	6	3	0	3	8	6	+2	9	Fourth place
5	A	Belgium	6	4	1	1	13	2	+11	13	Eliminated in group stage
6	A	Spain	6	2	1	3	8	8	0	7	Eliminated in group stage
7	B	France (H)	6	3	0	3	8	7	+1	9	Eliminated in group stage
8	B	Austria	6	1	0	5	2	22	−20	3	Eliminated in group stage
9	B	Switzerland	5	0	1	4	3	19	−16	1	Eliminated in group stage
10	A	Mexico	5	0	1	4	2	14	−12	1	Eliminated in group stage

Source: FIH
(H) Hosts
