= Field hockey at the Summer World University Games =

International field hockey competition

Field hockey competitions were included in the Universiade in 1991 and 2013 as an optional sport.

== Events ==
Event	91	13
Men's team	•	•
Women's team	•	•
Events	2	2

== Men's results ==
Last updated after the 2013 Summer Universiade

Team	(United Kingdom) 1991	(Russia) 2013
Great Britain	1st	-
Germany	2nd	3rd
Spain	3rd	-
South Korea	4th	6th
Australia	5th	-
Netherlands	6th	-
Canada	7th	-
Ireland	8th	-
Japan	9th	7th
France	10th	2nd
Belgium	11th	-
Ghana	12th	-
Poland	13th	10th
Italy	14th	8th
United States	15th	-
Soviet Union	16th	-
Russia	-	1st
Malaysia	-	4th
South Africa	-	5th
Ukraine	-	9th
Number of teams	16	10

=== Women's results ===
Last updated after the 2013 Summer Universiade

Team	(United Kingdom) 1991	(Russia) 2013
Netherlands	1st	-
China	2nd	-
South Korea	3rd	1st
Great Britain	4th	-
Germany	5th	-
Ireland	6th	-
Canada	7th	-
Australia	8th	-
Spain	9th	-
Soviet Union	10th	-
Zimbabwe	11th	-
Russia	-	2nd
Japan	-	3rd
Belarus	-	4th
Number of teams	11	4

== Medal winners ==
=== Men ===
Games	Gold	Silver	Bronze
1991	Great Britain	Germany	Spain
2013	Russia	France	Germany

=== Women ===
Games	Gold	Silver	Bronze
1991	Netherlands	China	South Korea
2013	South Korea	Russia	Japan

== Medal table ==
Last updated after the 2013 Summer Universiade.

Rank	Nation	Gold	Silver	Bronze	Total
1	Russia (RUS)	1	1	0	2
2	South Korea (KOR)	1	0	1	2
3	Great Britain (GBR)	1	0	0	1
3	Netherlands (NED)	1	0	0	1
5	Germany (GER)	0	1	1	2
6	China (CHN)	0	1	0	1
6	France (FRA)	0	1	0	1
8	Japan (JPN)	0	0	1	1
8	Spain (ESP)	0	0	1	1
Totals (9 entries)		4	4	4	12
