= Field hockey at the 1979 Mediterranean Games =

- Dates: 17 September 1979 – 25 September 1979

Field hockey was one of several sports at the 1979 Mediterranean Games. The 8th Mediterranean Games was held in Split, Yugoslavia and field hockey games played in Kaštela. Only men's teams participated in the field hockey tournament.

== Medalists ==
Event	Gold	Silver	Bronze
Men's Competition	Yugoslavia	Spain	Italy

== Group matches ==
	Team	Points	G	W	D	L	GF	GA	Diff
1.	Yugoslavia	8	5	4	0	1	15	10	+5
2.	Spain	7	5	3	1	1	13	3	+10
3.	Italy	6	5	2	2	1	12	6	+6
4.	France	5	5	2	1	2	13	7	+6
5.	Egypt	4	5	2	0	3	7	4	+3
6.	Malta	0	5	0	0	5	2	32	–30

- September 17, 1979

Spain	7 – 0	Malta
Italy	1 – 0	Egypt
Yugoslavia	4 – 3	France

- September 19, 1979

Yugoslavia	6 – 1	Malta
France	2 – 2	Italy
Egypt	1 – 0	Spain

- September 21, 1979

France	7 – 0	Malta
Yugoslavia	2 – 1	Egypt
Spain	1 – 1	Italy

- September 23, 1979

Egypt	5 – 0	Malta
Yugoslavia	2 – 1	Italy
Spain	1 – 0	France

- September 25, 1979

Italy	7 – 1	Malta
France	1 – 0	Egypt
Spain	4 – 1	Yugoslavia

== Standings ==
Rank	Team
1st place, gold medalist(s)	Yugoslavia
2nd place, silver medalist(s)	Spain
3rd place, bronze medalist(s)	Italy
4	France
5	Egypt
6	Malta
