= 1978 Women's Hockey World Cup =

1978 Women's FIH Hockey World Cup
Tournament details
- Host country: Spain
- City: Madrid
- Dates: 17–24 September
- Teams: 10 (from 3 confederations)

Final positions
- Champions: Netherlands (2nd title)
- Runner-up: West Germany
- Third place: Belgium

Tournament statistics
- Matches played: 30
- Goals scored: 98 (3.27 per match)

The 1978 Women's Hockey World Cup was the third edition of the Women's Hockey World Cup. It took place from 17 to 24 September in Madrid, Spain.

The Netherlands won the title for the second time, defeating West Germany 1–0 in the final.

== Results ==
=== Preliminary round ===
==== Pool A ====
| Pos | Team | Pld | W | D | L | GF | GA | GD | Pts | Qualification |
|---|---|---|---|---|---|---|---|---|---|---|
| 1 | West Germany | 4 | 4 | 0 | 0 | 22 | 1 | +21 | 8 | Advanced to Semi-finals |
| 2 | Belgium | 5 | 3 | 0 | 2 | 6 | 4 | +2 | 6 | Advanced to Semi-finals |
| 3 | Spain | 5 | 2 | 0 | 3 | 7 | 12 | −5 | 4 | |
| 4 | Japan | 4 | 2 | 0 | 2 | 6 | 9 | −3 | 4 | |
| 5 | Nigeria | 4 | 0 | 0 | 4 | 3 | 18 | −15 | 0 | |

Source: FIH
Rules for classification: 1) points; 2) play-off match.

16 September 1978
11:00

| Nigeria | 1–5 | Spain |
|---|---|---|
| | Report |

16 September 1978
15:00

| West Germany | 1–0 | Belgium |
|---|---|---|
| | Report |

17 September 1978
13:00

| Spain | 2–1 | Japan |
|---|---|---|
| | Report |

17 September 1978
15:00

| Nigeria | 1–10 | West Germany |
|---|---|---|
| | Report |

19 September 1978
13:00

| Belgium | 1–0 | Nigeria |
|---|---|---|
| | Report |

19 September 1978
17:00

| Japan | 0–4 | West Germany |
|---|---|---|
| | Report |

20 September 1978
11:00

| Japan | 2–1 | Nigeria |
|---|---|---|
| | Report |

20 September 1978
13:00

| Spain | 0–1 | Belgium |
|---|---|---|
| | Report |

21 September 1978
15:00

| Belgium | 2–3 | Japan |
|---|---|---|
| | Report |

21 September 1978
17:00

| West Germany | 7–0 | Spain |
|---|---|---|
| | Report |

- The following match was contested to determine second and third place in the pool.

22 September 1978
13:00

| Belgium | 2–0 | Spain |
|---|---|---|
| | Report |

==== Pool B ====
| Pos | Team | Pld | W | D | L | GF | GA | GD | Pts | Qualification |
|---|---|---|---|---|---|---|---|---|---|---|
| 1 | Netherlands | 4 | 4 | 0 | 0 | 15 | 3 | +12 | 8 | Advanced to Semi-finals |
| 2 | Argentina | 4 | 3 | 0 | 1 | 6 | 4 | +2 | 6 | Advanced to Semi-finals |
| 3 | India | 4 | 1 | 1 | 2 | 4 | 7 | −3 | 3 | |
| 4 | Canada | 4 | 1 | 1 | 2 | 4 | 8 | −4 | 3 | |
| 5 | Czechoslovakia | 4 | 0 | 0 | 4 | 2 | 9 | −7 | 0 | |

Source: FIH
Rules for classification: 1) points; 2) play-off match.

16 September 1978
13:00

| Argentina | 1–0 | Canada |
|---|---|---|
| | Report |

16 September 1978
17:00

| Netherlands | 4–1 | India |
|---|---|---|
| | Report |

17 September 1978
11:00

| India | 1–2 | Argentina |
|---|---|---|
| | Report |

17 September 1978
17:00

| Czechoslovakia | 1–3 | Netherlands |
|---|---|---|
| | Report |

19 September 1978
11:00

| Argentina | 2–1 | Czechoslovakia |
|---|---|---|
| | Report |

19 September 1978
15:00

| Canada | 1–1 | India |
|---|---|---|
| | Report |

20 September 1978
13:00

| Canada | 0–6 | Netherlands |
|---|---|---|
| | Report |

20 September 1978
17:00

| India | 1–0 | Czechoslovakia |
|---|---|---|
| | Report |

21 September 1978
11:00

| Netherlands | 2–1 | Argentina |
|---|---|---|
| | Report |

21 September 1978
13:00

| Czechoslovakia | 0–3 | Canada |
|---|---|---|
| | Report |

=== Classification round ===
==== Ninth and tenth place ====
23 September 1978
09:00

| Nigeria | 0–4 | Czechoslovakia |
|---|---|---|
| | Report |

==== Fifth to eighth place classification ====
Crossover
23 September 1978
Spain | 0
Canada | 3
23 September 1978
India | 0
Japan | 3

Fifth Place
24 September 1978
Canada | 4
Japan | 0
Seventh Place
24 September 1978
Spain | 0
India | 1

===== Crossover =====
23 September 1978
11:00

| India | 0–3 | Japan |
|---|---|---|
| | Report |

23 September 1978
11:00

| Spain | 0–3 | Canada |
|---|---|---|
| | Report |

===== Seventh and eighth place =====
24 September 1978
11:00

| Spain | 0–1 | India |
|---|---|---|
| | Report |

===== Fifth and sixth place =====
24 September 1978
11:00

| Canada | 4–0 | Japan |
|---|---|---|
| | Report |

==== First to fourth place classification ====
Semi-finals
23 September 1978
West Germany | 1
Argentina | 0
23 September 1978
Netherlands | 6
Belgium | 0

Final
24 September 1978
West Germany | 0
Netherlands | 1
Third Place
24 September 1978
Argentina | 0 (2)
Belgium (p.s) | 0 (3)

===== Semi-finals =====
23 September 1978
15:00

| Netherlands | 6–0 | Belgium |
|---|---|---|
| | Report |

23 September 1978
15:00

| West Germany | 1–0 | Argentina |
|---|---|---|
| | Report |

===== Third and fourth place =====
24 September 1978
15:00

| Argentina | 0–0 (a.e.t.) | Belgium |
|---|---|---|
| | Report |

===== Final =====
24 September 1978
17:00

| West Germany | 0–1 | Netherlands |
|---|---|---|
| | Report |

1978 Women's Hockey World Cup winner

Netherlands
Second title

== Winning squad ==
Netherlands

- Toos Bax
- Suzan Bekker
- Madelon Belien
- Margriet Bleyerveld
- Fieke Boekhorst
- Bernadette de Beus
- Irene Hendriks
- Elsemiek Hillen
- Sandra Le Poole
- Julien Mahler
- Maria Mattheussen-Fikkers
- Lisette Sevens
- Anneke van Puffelen
- Nel van Kollenburg
- Sophie van Weiler
- Cathy Woudenberg-Schroder

== Statistics ==
=== Final standings ===
As per statistical convention in field hockey, matches decided in extra time are counted as wins and losses, while matches decided by penalty shoot-outs are counted as draws.

| Pos | Grp | Team | Pld | W | D | L | GF | GA | GD | Pts | Final result |
|---|---|---|---|---|---|---|---|---|---|---|---|
| 1st place, gold medalist(s) | B | Netherlands | 6 | 6 | 0 | 0 | 22 | 3 | +19 | 18 | Gold Medal |
| 2nd place, silver medalist(s) | A | West Germany | 6 | 5 | 0 | 1 | 23 | 2 | +21 | 15 | Silver Medal |
| 3rd place, bronze medalist(s) | A | Belgium | 7 | 3 | 1 | 3 | 6 | 10 | −4 | 10 | Bronze Medal |
| 3rd place, bronze medalist(s) | B | Argentina | 6 | 3 | 1 | 2 | 6 | 5 | +1 | 10 | Bronze Medal |
| 5 | B | Canada | 6 | 3 | 1 | 2 | 11 | 8 | +3 | 10 | Eliminated in group stage |
| 6 | A | Japan | 6 | 3 | 0 | 3 | 9 | 13 | −4 | 9 | Eliminated in group stage |
| 7 | B | India | 6 | 2 | 1 | 3 | 5 | 10 | −5 | 7 | Eliminated in group stage |
| 8 | A | Spain | 7 | 2 | 0 | 5 | 7 | 16 | −9 | 6 | Eliminated in group stage |
| 9 | B | Czechoslovakia | 5 | 1 | 0 | 4 | 6 | 9 | −3 | 3 | Eliminated in group stage |
| 10 | A | Nigeria | 5 | 0 | 0 | 5 | 3 | 22 | −19 | 0 | Eliminated in group stage |

Source: FIH
