= Field hockey at the 1963 Mediterranean Games =

- Dates: 22 September 1963 – 26 September 1963

Field hockey was one of several sports at the 1963 Mediterranean Games. The 4th Mediterranean Games was held in Naples, Italy. Only men's teams participated in the field hockey tournament.

== Medalists ==
Event	Gold	Silver	Bronze
Men's Competition	United Arab Republic	Spain	Italy

== Group matches ==
	Team	Points	G	W	D	L	GF	GA	Diff
1.	United Arab Republic	7	4	3	1	0	10	1	+9
2.	Spain	6	4	2	2	0	12	4	+8
3.	Italy	4	4	2	0	2	6	6	0
4.	Yugoslavia	3	4	1	1	2	6	6	0
5.	Morocco	0	4	0	0	4	0	17	–17

- September 22, 1963

Italy	2 – 0	Yugoslavia
Spain	6 – 0	Morocco

- September 23, 1963

Spain	2 – 2	Yugoslavia
United Arab Republic	4 – 0	Morocco

- September 24, 1963

Italy	3 – 0	Morocco
Spain	1 – 1	United Arab Republic

- September 25, 1963

United Arab Republic	3 – 0	Italy
Yugoslavia	4 – 0	Morocco

- September 26, 1963

United Arab Republic	2 – 0	Yugoslavia
Spain	3 – 1	Italy

== Standings ==
Rank	Team
1st place, gold medalist(s)	United Arab Republic
2nd place, silver medalist(s)	Spain
3rd place, bronze medalist(s)	Italy
4	Yugoslavia
5	Morocco
