= Field hockey at the 1991 Summer Universiade =

Field hockey competition

Field hockey was contested at the 1991 Summer Universiade in Sheffield, United Kingdom.

Event	Gold	Silver	Bronze
Men's field hockey	Great Britain (GBR)	Germany (GER)	Spain (ESP)
Women's field hockey	Netherlands (NED)	China (CHN)	South Korea (KOR)
