= Czechoslovakia men's national field hockey team =

Czechoslovakia
- Confederation: EHF (Europe)

European Championship
- Appearances: 3 (first in 1970)
- Best result: 9th (1974)

The Czechoslovakia men's national field hockey team represented Czechoslovakia in men's international field hockey.

The team participated in three European Championships. Its best result was at the 1974 edition when it finished ninth.

== Tournament record ==
=== European Championship ===
- 1970 – 10th place
- 1974 – 9th place
- 1978 – 10th place

== See also ==
- Czech Republic men's national field hockey team
- Czechoslovakia women's national field hockey team
- Slovakia men's national field hockey team
