= Otilia Mascarenhas =

Indian field hockey player

Personal information
- Nationality: Indian
- Born: Goa

Sport
- Country: India
- Sport: Field hockey

Otilia Mascarenhas is an Indian field hockey player from Goa. She is a former member and captain of the Indian women’s hockey team during the 60s. She received Arjuna Award in 1973. She is a sports medicine doctor. She now lives in Cologne, Germany.

== Early life ==
Mascarenhas was born in Goa. She shifted to Pune to study at the Armed Forces Medical College, Pune. Later, she went to Germany to study sports medicine. She married Lothar Brunst, a former football player in the German second division.

== Career ==
Mascarenhas was part of the Indian women's hockey team that played the 1971 World Cup where India finished eighth. She also played the World Cup in 1974 at Mandelieu, France, where Indian women reached the semifinals and finished fourth.

She represented the Indian Hockey team in many tournaments from 1965 to 1974 and was the captain of the women's team from 1969 to 1973. She was the first Goan Arjuna awardee in 1974 and awarded the Shiv Chhatrapati Award in 1971.

She is also an Orthopaedic surgeon and super specialist in Sports Medicine and Traumatology. She is practicing in Germany and is also a visiting doctor to India.

=== Ancestral property ===
She had her ancestral root in Porvorim and has the family house and other property which she and her brother, Oscar Mascarenhas own. However, an impersonator sold the property in the name of her deceased uncle Jose Fernandes who died in 2002. Fernandes wrote a will in 1997 and she inherited the property. Her several appeals and petitions to the government to solve the issue have failed.

In December 2013, she held a press conference in Goa exposing the land grabbing syndicate and threatened to return her Arjuna Award if the culprits are not booked and arrested. In October 2013, about 11 years after the death of her uncle the imposter sold the property for Rs.7,000,000. Following her press conference, the then chief minister of Goa Manohar Parrikar appointed a special investigating officer at the Crime Branch to probe into the alleged case against the 'land mafia syndicate'.

In March 2017, police managed to arrest Moises Fernandes, one of the main accused in the Otilia Mascarenhas land grab case, was arrested by the Goa Police Economic Offences Wing after a three year hunt.

=== Legacy ===
A sports ground in Pune was named after her as Oitlia Mascarenhas Sports Ground, AFMC, Pune. The sports stadium in the Armed Forces Medical College in Pune, where she studied, has been named after her . She has also been recognized in the “Hall of Fame” in the All-India Armed Forces Medical Services.

== Awards ==
- Arjuna Award - 1973
- Shiv Chhatrapati Award in 1971
