= Field hockey at the 2013 Summer Universiade – Men's tournament =

Men's field hockey at the XXVII Summer Universiade
- Venue: various
- Dates: July 7, 2013 – July 15, 2013

Medalists
1st place, gold medalist(s)		Russia (RUS)
2nd place, silver medalist(s)		France (FRA)
3rd place, bronze medalist(s)		Germany (GER)

The men's tournament of field hockey at the 2013 Summer Universiade was held from July 7 to 15 in Kazan, Russia.

== Preliminary round ==
=== Group A ===
Pos	Team	Pld	W	D	L	GF	GA	GD	Pts
1	Russia (H)	4	4	0	0	16	4	+12	12
2	Malaysia	4	3	0	1	14	7	+7	9
3	South Africa	4	1	1	2	11	12	−1	4
4	Italy	4	1	1	2	10	15	−5	4
5	Poland	4	0	0	4	8	21	−13	0

Rules for classification: 1) points; 2) matches won; 3) goal difference; 4) goals for; 5) head-to-head result; 6) field goals scored.
(H) Hosts

7 July 2013
14:30

Malaysia	7–1	Poland
Dangerouslee 4', 24'; Makbul Singh 35'; Nasruddin 50'; Zainol 52'; Adabi 56'; Ibrahim 65'	Report	Bulka 70'

Umpires:
Maksym Perepelytsya (UKR)
Lucas Olivier (FRA)

7 July 2013
16:30

South Africa	4–4	Italy
Fourie 12'; Glutz 18'; Panther 50'; Kimfley 61'	Report	Nunez 17', 65'; Grossi 31'; Dussi 59'

Umpires:
Michal Margolien (SVK)
Yoshikun Tomiyama (JPN)

8 July 2013
14:30

South Africa	4–2	Poland
Guise-Brown 4', 9'; Robinson 30'; Sanan 35'	Report	Ferenc 27'; Kasprzyk 52'

Umpires:
Shin Dong-Yun (KOR)
Benjamin Göntgen (GER)

8 July 2013
16:30

Russia	3–0	Italy
Yankun 20'; Sinyagin 35'; Golubev 40'	Report

Umpires:
Jakub Mejzlik (CZE)
Yoshikuni Tomiyama (JPN)

10 July 2013
15:30

Poland	4–5	Italy
Bratkowski 23'; Pacanowski 27'; Hulboj 32'; Ferenc 49'	Report	Dussi 4'; Corsi 9'; Nunez 52', 70'; Manes 61'

Umpires:
Benjamin Göntgen (GER)
Lucas Olivier (FRA)

10 July 2013
17:30

Russia	4–1	Malaysia
Komarov 17'; Sinyagin 26'; Kurbanov 27'; Golubev 47'	Report	Razie 8'

Umpires:
Michal Margolien (SVK)
Maksym Perepelytsya (UKR)

11 July 2013
15:30

Italy	1–4	Malaysia
Corsi 15'	Report	Razie 18', 55'; Dangerouslee 38', 45'

Umpires:
Maksym Perepelytsya (UKR)
Shin Dong-Yun (KOR)

11 July 2013
17:30

South Africa	2–4	Russia
Mvimbi 13', 64'	Report	Siuskin 16'; Yankun 22'; Sinyagin 61'; Kornilov 70'

Umpires:
Jakub Mejzlik (CZE)
Benjamin Göntgen (GER)

13 July 2013
14:30

Malaysia	2–1	South Africa
Razie 33'; Nasruddin 53'	Report	Panther 28'

Umpires:
Jakub Mejzlik (CZE)
Maksym Perepelytsya (UKR)

13 July 2013
16:30

Russia	5–1	Poland
Komarov 5'; Maiorov 30'; Golubev 40'; Kornilov 48'; Sinyagin 50'	Report	Pacanowski 31'

Umpires:
Shin Dong-Yun (KOR)
Yoshikun Tomiyama (JPN)

=== Group B ===
Pos	Team	Pld	W	D	L	GF	GA	GD	Pts
1	France	4	4	0	0	30	8	+22	12
2	Germany	4	3	0	1	17	7	+10	9
3	South Korea	4	0	2	2	16	25	−9	2
4	Japan	4	0	2	2	8	17	−9	2
5	Ukraine	4	0	2	2	7	21	−14	2

Rules for classification: 1) points; 2) matches won; 3) goal difference; 4) goals for; 5) head-to-head result; 6) field goals scored.

7 July 2013
10:00

South Korea	5–5	Ukraine
Yang Ji-Hun 14'; You Seung-Ju 31', 70'; Jeong Hwan-Yong 39', 54'	Report	Gerasymenko 14'; Pazuik 27', 47'; Yasinskyi 55'; Mirzoian 63'

Umpires:
Anton Kochin (RUS)
Nazmi Bin Kamarudin (MAS)

7 July 2013
12:00

Japan	2–5	France
Hoshi 8'; Murata 38'	Report	Baumgarten 2'; Sevestre 18'; Sanchez 58', 68'; Lockwood 64'

Umpires:
Christian Dangelo (ITA)
Jacub Mejzlik (CZE)

8 July 2013
10:00

Germany	4–0	Ukraine
Wüterich 29', 56'; Ebeling 33'; Alex 66'	Report

Umpires:
Michal Margolien (SVK)
Christian Dangelo (ITA)

8 July 2013
12:00

South Korea	4–11	France
Yang Ji-Hun 31', 70'; You Min-Young 35'; Jeong Hwan-Yong 59'	Report	Le Coimtre 24'; Martin-Brisac 26'; Baumgarten 36'; Lockwood 39', 52', 64', 69'; Kieffer 47'; Sanchez 49'; Jansen 55'; M. Genestet 56'

Umpires:
Sean Rapaport (RSA)
Grzegorz Rysinski (POL)

10 July 2013
9:00

France	10–0	Ukraine
Sanchez 5', 26', 31'; Martin-Brisac 18', 55'; Sevestre 25'; Deront 33'; Kieffer 47', 48', 54'	Report

Umpires:
Anton Kochin (RUS)
Grzegorz Rysinski (POL)

10 July 2013
11:00

Germany	6–0	Japan
Eberling 13'; Knüpfer 18'; Alex 22'; Fürste 24'; Haase 42'; Meyer 63'	Report

Umpires:
Nazmi Bin Kamarudin (MAS)
Sean Rapaport (RSA)

11 July 2013
9:00

Ukraine	2–2	Japan
Pazuik 56', 61'	Report	Kitazato 5'; Matsumura 18'

Umpires:
Sean Rapaport (RSA)
Christian Dangelo (ITA)

11 July 2013
11:00

Germany	5–3	South Korea
Lim 22'; Funken 34'; Fürste 39'; Keusgen 65'; Ahlers 69'	Report	You Seung-Ju 4'; Choi Jung-Pi 54'; Kim Ju-Hun 63'

Umpires:
Anton Kochin (RUS)
Yoshikuni Tomiyama (JPN)

13 July 2013
10:00

Japan	4–4	South Korea
Oie 8', 47'; Kitazato 38'; Ochiai 58'	Report	Choi Jung-Pi 13'; You Seung-Ju 22'; Hwang Weon-Ki 25'; Yang Ji-Hun 35'

Umpires:
Grzegorz Rysinski (POL)
Christian Dangelo (ITA)

13 July 2013
12:00

Germany	2–4	France
Fürste 4', 65'	Report	Baumgarten 2'; M. Genestet 27', 35'; Sanchez 67'

Umpires:
Michal Margolien (SVK)
Nazmi Bin Kamarudin (MAS)

== Classification ==
=== 9th-place game ===
15 July 2013
9:00

Poland	3–3	Ukraine
Pacanowski 22'; Ferenc 31', 33'	Report	Yakovenko 41'; Mirzoian 59', 66'
Penalties
Raciniewski (penalty shoot-out scored); Bulka (penalty shoot-out missed); Krokosz (penalty shoot-out scored); Pacanowski (penalty shoot-out missed); Ferenc (penalty shoot-out scored)	3–4	(penalty shoot-out scored) Moroz; (penalty shoot-out missed) Yasinskyi; (penalty shoot-out scored) Serdiuk; (penalty shoot-out scored) Luppa; (penalty shoot-out scored) Diachuk

Umpires:
Benjamin Göntgen(GER)
Anton Kochin (RUS)

=== 7th-place game ===
15 July 2013
11:15

Italy	1–4	Japan
Nunez 27'	Report	Kitazato 5', 21'; Harada 37'; Ochiai 49'

Umpires:
Shin Dong-Yun (KOR)
Grzegorz Rysinski (POL)

=== 5th-place game ===
15 July 2013
13:30

South Africa	4–3	South Korea
Cairncross 26'; Phillips 46'; Guise-Brown 62'; Glutz 66'	Report	Lee Jung-Jun 11'; You Seung-Ju 35'; Choi Jung-Pil 39'

Umpires:
Lucas Olivier (FRA)
Maksym Perepelytsya (UKR)

== Final round ==
=== Bronze-medal match ===
15 July 2013
16:00

Malaysia	3–4	Germany
Tengku 33', 65'; Razie 49'	Report	Knüpfer 3'; Ebeling 56'; Haase 58'; Fürste 70'

Umpires:
Sean Rapaport (RSA)
Michal Margolien (SVK)

=== Gold-medal match ===
15 July 2013
18:15

Russia	2–1	France
Plesetckii 19'; Kornilov 42'	Report	Baumgarten 34'

Umpires:
Nazmi Bin Kamarudin (MAS)
Jakub Mejzlik (CZE)

== Final standings ==
Place	Team	Score
1st place, gold medalist(s)	Russia	5–0–0
2nd place, silver medalist(s)	France	4–0–1
3rd place, bronze medalist(s)	Germany	4–0–1
4	Malaysia	3–0–2
5	South Africa	2–1–2
6	South Korea	0–2–3
7	Japan	1–2–2
8	Italy	1–1–3
9	Ukraine	1–2–2
10	Poland	0–0–5
