= 1978 Men's EuroHockey Nations Championship =

Tournament details
- Host country: West Germany
- City: Hanover
- Dates: 2–10 September
- Teams: 12 (from 1 confederation)

Final positions
- Champions: West Germany (2nd title)
- Runner-up: Netherlands
- Third place: England

Tournament statistics
- Matches played: 42
- Goals scored: 164 (3.9 per match)
- Top scorer(s): (Netherlands) Paul Litjens (16 goals)

The 1978 Men's EuroHockey Nations Championship was the third edition of the Men's EuroHockey Nations Championship, the quadrennial international men's field hockey championship of Europe organized by the European Hockey Federation. It was held in Hanover, West Germany from 2 to 10 September 1978.

The hosts West Germany won their second title by defeating the Netherlands 3–2 after extra time in the final. England won the bronze medal by defeating the defending champions Spain 2–0.

== Preliminary round ==
=== Pool A ===
Pos	Team	Pld	W	D	L	GF	GA	GD	Pts	Qualification
1	West Germany (H)	5	4	1	0	21	2	+19	9	Semi-finals
2	England	5	4	1	0	17	2	+15	9	Semi-finals
3	Poland	5	1	2	2	8	6	+2	4	
4	France	5	2	0	3	7	17	−10	4	
5	Scotland	5	1	1	3	5	10	−5	3	
6	Gibraltar	5	0	1	4	3	24	−21	1	

Source: TheSports.org
(H) Hosts

2 September 1978

Scotland	2–0	Gibraltar

2 September 1978

West Germany	1–1	England

2 September 1978

Poland	5–0	France

3 September 1978

West Germany	3–0	Scotland

3 September 1978

England	2–0	Poland

3 September 1978

France	3–1	Gibraltar

4 September 1978

England	2–0	Scotland

4 September 1978

Poland	1–1	Gibraltar

4 September 1978

West Germany	5–0	France

6 September 1978

England	4–0	France

6 September 1978

Poland	1–1	Scotland

6 September 1978

West Germany	10–0	Gibraltar

7 September 1978

France	4–2	Scotland

7 September 1978

England	8–1	Gibraltar

7 September 1978

West Germany	2–1	Poland

=== Pool B ===
Pos	Team	Pld	W	D	L	GF	GA	GD	Pts	Qualification
1	Netherlands	5	4	1	0	19	8	+11	9	Semi-finals
2	Spain	5	3	1	1	10	8	+2	7	Semi-finals
3	Wales	5	2	2	1	8	9	−1	6	
4	Ireland	5	2	0	3	7	10	−3	4	
5	Soviet Union	5	1	1	3	9	11	−2	3	
6	Czechoslovakia	5	0	1	4	6	13	−7	1	

Source: TheSports.org

2 September 1978

Soviet Union	3–0	Czechoslovakia

2 September 1978

Netherlands	3–0	Ireland

2 September 1978

Spain	3–0	Wales

3 September 1978

Wales	1–0	Czechoslovakia

3 September 1978

Ireland	3–2	Soviet Union

3 September 1978

Netherlands	6–3	Spain

Ireland	3–2	Czechoslovakia

Netherlands	2–2	Wales

Spain	1–0	Soviet Union

6 September 1978

Netherlands	4–1	Soviet Union

6 September 1978

Spain	2–2	Czechoslovakia

6 September 1978

Ireland	1–2	Wales

7 September 1978

Spain	1–0	Ireland

7 September 1978

Wales	3–3	Soviet Union

7 September 1978

Netherlands	4–2	Czechoslovakia

== Classification round ==
=== Ninth to twelfth place classification ===
9–12th place semi-finals
9 September
Czechoslovakia	2
Scotland	1
9 September
Soviet Union	1
Gibraltar	0

Ninth place
10 September
Soviet Union (a.e.t.)	2
Czechoslovakia	1
Eleventh place
10 September
Scotland	2
Gibraltar	1

==== 9–12th place semi-finals ====
9 September 1978

Czechoslovakia	2–1	Scotland

9 September 1978

Soviet Union	1–0	Gibraltar

==== Eleventh place game ====
10 September 1978

Scotland	2–1	Gibraltar

==== Ninth place game ====
10 September 1978

Soviet Union	2–1 (a.e.t.)	Czechoslovakia

=== Fifth to eighth place classification ===
5–8th place semi-finals
9 September
Poland (a.e.t.)	2
Ireland	1
9 September
Wales	3
France	2

Fifth place
10 September
Poland	4
Wales	1
Seventh place
10 September
France	3
Ireland	1

==== 5–8th place semi-finals ====
9 September 1978

Poland	2–1 (a.e.t.)	Ireland

9 September 1978

Wales	3–2	France

==== Seventh place game ====
10 September 1978

France	3–1	Ireland

==== Fifth place game ====
10 September 1978

Poland	4–1	Wales

=== First to fourth place classification ===
Semi-finals
9 September
West Germany	3
Spain	2
9 September
Netherlands	5
England	0

Final
10 September
West Germany (a.e.t.)	3
Netherlands	2
Third place
10 September
England	2
Spain	0

==== Semi-finals ====
9 September 1978

West Germany	3–2	Spain

9 September 1978

Netherlands	5–0	England

==== Third place game ====
10 September 1978

England	2–0	Spain

==== Final ====
10 September 1978

West Germany	3–2 (a.e.t.)	Netherlands

== Final standings ==
1. West Germany
2. Netherlands
3. England
4. Spain
5. Poland
6. Wales
7. France
8. Ireland
9. Soviet Union
10. Czechoslovakia
11. Scotland
12. Gibraltar
