= Czechoslovakia women's national field hockey team =

Women's national field hockey team representing Czechoslovakia

Czechoslovakia
- Confederation: EHF (Europe)

Olympic Games
- Appearances: 1 (first in 1980)
- Best result: (silver) 2nd (1980)

World Cup
- Appearances: 1 (first in 1978)
- Best result: 9th (1978)

European Championship
- Appearances: 1 (first in 1984)
- Best result: 9th (1984)
Medal record
Olympic Games
Silver medal – second place	1980 Moscow	Team

The Czechoslovakia women's national field hockey team represented Czechoslovakia in international women's field hockey. It won the silver medal at the 1980 Summer Olympics in Moscow, Soviet Union.

== Tournament record ==
=== Summer Olympics ===
- 1980 – (silver)

=== World Cup ===
- 1978 – 9th place

=== European Championship ===
- 1984 – 9th place

=== Friendship Games ===
- 1984 – 4th place

== See also ==
- Czechoslovakia men's national field hockey team
- Czech Republic women's national field hockey team
- Slovakia women's national field hockey team
