= 1984 Women's EuroHockey Nations Championship =

International field hockey competition

Tournament details
- Host country: France
- City: Lille
- Dates: 3–13 May
- Teams: 12 (from 1 confederation)

Final positions
- Champions: Netherlands (1st title)
- Runner-up: Soviet Union
- Third place: West Germany

Tournament statistics
- Matches played: 42
- Goals scored: 134 (3.19 per match)

The 1984 Women's EuroHockey Nations Championship was the inaugural edition of the Women's EuroHockey Nations Championship, the quadrennial international women's field hockey championship of Europe organized by the European Hockey Federation. It was held in Lille, France, from 3 to 13 May 1984.

The Netherlands won the first-ever European Championship by defeating the Soviet Union 2–0 in the final. West Germany won the bronze medal by defeating England 1–0.

== Preliminary round ==
=== Pool A ===
Pos	Team	Pld	W	D	L	GF	GA	GD	Pts	Qualification
1	Soviet Union	5	5	0	0	37	2	+35	10	Semi-finals
2	Netherlands	5	4	0	1	19	4	+15	8	Semi-finals
3	Scotland	5	3	0	2	6	7	−1	6	
4	Belgium	5	1	1	3	3	14	−11	3	
5	Austria	5	1	0	4	3	20	−17	2	
6	Italy	5	0	1	4	3	24	−21	1	

Source: TheSports.org

3 May 1984

Scotland	2–0	Austria

3 May 1984

Netherlands	7–0	Italy

3 May 1984

Belgium	0–7	Soviet Union

5 May 1984

Italy	0–12	Soviet Union

5 May 1984

Netherlands	3–0	Austria

5 May 1984

Belgium	0–2	Scotland

6 May 1984

Italy	2–3	Austria

6 May 1984

Netherlands	4–0	Belgium

6 May 1984

Soviet Union	4–0	Scotland

7 May 1984

Soviet Union	11–0	Austria

7 May 1984

Belgium	1–1	Italy

7 May 1984

Netherlands	3–1	Scotland

9 May 1984

Italy	0–1	Scotland

9 May 1984

Netherlands	2–3	Soviet Union

9 May 1984

Belgium	2–0	Austria

=== Pool B ===
Pos	Team	Pld	W	D	L	GF	GA	GD	Pts	Qualification
1	West Germany	5	5	0	0	18	0	+18	10	Semi-finals
2	England	5	3	1	1	8	3	+5	7	Semi-finals
3	Ireland	5	2	1	2	3	5	−2	5	
4	Spain	5	2	0	3	3	8	−5	4	
5	Czechoslovakia	5	1	0	4	2	9	−7	2	
6	France (H)	5	0	2	3	3	12	−9	2	

Source: TheSports.org
(H) Hosts

3 May 1984

Ireland	1–0	Czechoslovakia

3 May 1984

France	1–2	Spain

3 May 1984

West Germany	3–0	England

5 May 1984

Ireland	1–0	Spain

5 May 1984

West Germany	1–0	Czechoslovakia

5 May 1984

France	0–0	England

6 May 1984

West Germany	3–0	Ireland

6 May 1984

France	1–2	Czechoslovakia

6 May 1984

England	2–0	Spain

8 May 1984

Spain	1–0	Czechoslovakia

8 May 1984

England	1–0	Ireland

8 May 1984

France	0–7	West Germany

9 May 1984

England	5–0	Czechoslovakia

9 May 1984

France	1–1	Ireland

9 May 1984

West Germany	4–0	Spain

== Classification round ==
=== Ninth to twelfth place classification ===
9–12th place semi-finals
11 May
Austria	1
France	3
11 May
Czechoslovakia	4
Italy	0

Ninth place
12 May
Czechoslovakia	2
France	0
Eleventh place
12 May
Austria	1
Italy	0

==== 9–12th place semi-finals ====
11 May 1984

Austria	1–3	France

11 May 1984

Czechoslovakia	4–0	Italy

==== Eleventh place game ====
12 May 1984

Austria	1–0	Italy

==== Ninth place game ====
12 May 1984

Czechoslovakia	2–0	France

=== Fifth to eighth place classification ===
5–8th place semi-finals
11 May
Scotland	2
Spain	0
11 May
Ireland	1
Belgium	0

Fifth place
12 May
Ireland	2
Scotland	0
Seventh place
12 May
Spain	1
Belgium	0

==== 5–8th place semi-finals ====
11 May 1984

Scotland	2–0	Spain

11 May 1984

Ireland	1–0	Belgium

==== Seventh place game ====
12 May 1984

Spain	1–0	Belgium

==== Fifth place game ====
12 May 1984

Ireland	2–0	Scotland

=== First to fourth place classification ===
Semi-finals
11 May
West Germany	1
Netherlands	3
11 May
Soviet Union	2
England	0

Final
13 May
Netherlands	2
Soviet Union	0
Third place
13 May
West Germany	1
England	0

==== Semi-finals ====
11 May 1984

Soviet Union	2–0	England

11 May 1984

West Germany	1–3	Netherlands

==== Third place game ====
13 May 1984

West Germany	1–0	England

==== Final ====
13 May 1984

Netherlands	2–0	Soviet Union

== Final standings ==
1. Netherlands
2. Soviet Union
3. West Germany
4. England
5. Ireland
6. Scotland
7. Spain
8. Belgium
9. Czechoslovakia
10. France
11. Austria
12. Italy
