= 1974 Men's EuroHockey Nations Championship =

Tournament details
- Host country: Spain
- City: Madrid
- Dates: 1–11 May
- Teams: 18 (from 1 confederation)
- Venue: Club de Campo Villa de Madrid

Final positions
- Champions: Spain (1st title)
- Runner-up: West Germany
- Third place: Netherlands

Tournament statistics
- Matches played: 57
- Goals scored: 183 (3.21 per match)

The 1974 Men's EuroHockey Nations Championship was the second edition of the Men's EuroHockey Nations Championship, the quadrennial international men's field hockey championship of Europe organized by the European Hockey Federation. It was held at Club de Campo Villa de Madrid in Madrid, Spain from 2 to 11 May 1974.

The hosts Spain won their first European title by defeating the defending champions West Germany 1–0 in the final. The Netherlands won the bronze medal by defeating England 4–1.

== Preliminary round ==
=== Pool A ===
Pos	Team	Pld	W	D	L	GF	GA	GD	Pts	Qualification
1	West Germany	4	4	0	0	22	1	+21	8	Quarter-finals
2	Scotland	4	3	0	1	11	7	+4	6	Quarter-finals
3	Czechoslovakia	4	1	1	2	2	9	−7	3	
4	Denmark	4	1	1	2	2	10	−8	3	
5	Switzerland	4	0	0	4	2	12	−10	0	

2 May 1974
12:30

West Germany	6–1	Switzerland

2 May 1974
18:30

Scotland	5–0	Denmark

3 May 1974
12:30

Scotland	3–1	Czechoslovakia

3 May 1974
18:30

Denmark	2–1	Switzerland

4 May 1974
14:30

West Germany	4–0	Denmark

4 May 1974
17:30

Czechoslovakia	1–0	Switzerland

5 May 1974
18:30

West Germany	6–0	Czechoslovakia

5 May 1974
18:30

Scotland	3–0	Switzerland

6 May 1974
15:30

West Germany	6–0	Scotland

6 May 1974
15:30

Czechoslovakia	0–0	Denmark

=== Pool B ===
Pos	Team	Pld	W	D	L	GF	GA	GD	Pts	Qualification
1	Netherlands	3	3	0	0	12	2	+10	6	Quarter-finals
2	Poland	3	2	0	1	8	4	+4	4	Quarter-finals
3	Ireland	3	1	0	2	3	4	−1	2	
4	Portugal	3	0	0	3	0	13	−13	0	

2 May 1974
15:30

Netherlands	6–0	Portugal

3 May 1974
18:30

Netherlands	2–0	Ireland

3 May 1974
18:30

Poland	4–0	Portugal

5 May 1974
12:30

Ireland	3–0	Portugal

5 May 1974
15:30

Netherlands	4–2	Poland

6 May 1974
18:30

Poland	2–0	Ireland

=== Pool C ===
Pos	Team	Pld	W	D	L	GF	GA	GD	Pts	Qualification
1	England	4	4	0	0	9	0	+9	8	Quarter-finals
2	France	4	3	0	1	12	3	+9	6	Quarter-finals
3	Italy	4	2	0	2	3	6	−3	4	
4	Austria	4	1	0	3	5	8	−3	2	
5	Finland	4	0	0	4	0	12	−12	0	

2 May 1974
15:30

France	2–0	Italy

2 May 1974
18:30

England	2–0	Finland

3 May 1974
12:30

France	5–1	Austria

3 May 1974
15:30

Italy	1–0	Finland

4 May 1974
14:30

Austria	4–0	Finland

4 May 1974
17:30

England	4–0	Italy

5 May 1974
12:30

France	5–0	Finland

5 May 1974
15:30

England	1–0	Austria

6 May 1974
15:30

England	2–0	France

6 May 1974
18:30

Italy	2–0	Austria

=== Pool D ===
Pos	Team	Pld	W	D	L	GF	GA	GD	Pts	Qualification
1	Spain (H)	3	2	1	0	8	0	+8	5	Quarter-finals
2	Wales	3	2	1	0	4	1	+3	5	Quarter-finals
3	Belgium	3	0	1	2	2	6	−4	1	
4	Yugoslavia	3	0	1	2	1	8	−7	1	

(H) Hosts

2 May 1974
12:30

Spain	6–0	Yugoslavia

2 May 1974
18:30

Wales	3–1	Belgium

3 May 1974
15:30

Wales	1–0	Yugoslavia

4 May 1974
17:30

Spain	2–0	Belgium

5 May 1974
15:30

Belgium	1–1	Yugoslavia

5 May 1974
18:30

Spain	0–0	Wales

== Seventeenth to eighteenth place classification ==
=== 17th and 18th place ===
8 May 1974
12:00

Switzerland	2–1	Finland

== Ninth to 16th place classification ==
=== Bracket ===
9–16th place quarter-finals
8 May
Czechoslovakia	2
Portugal	1
8 May
Italy	2
Yugoslavia	1
8 May
Belgium	3
Austria	2
8 May
Ireland	1
Denmark	0

9–12th place semi-finals
10 May
Czechoslovakia	2
Italy	0
10 May
Belgium	1
Ireland	0

Ninth place
11 May
Czechoslovakia	2
Belgium	1
11th place
11 May
Ireland	1
Italy	0

=== 9–16th place quarter-finals ===
8 May 1974
12:00

Italy	2–1	Yugoslavia

8 May 1974
15:30

Ireland	1–0	Denmark

8 May 1974
15:30

Czechoslovakia	2–1	Portugal

8 May 1974
18:30

Belgium	3–2	Austria

=== 13th to 16th place classification ===
13–16th place semi-finals
10 May
Yugoslavia	4
Portugal	0
10 May
Denmark	1
Austria	0

13th place
11 May
Yugoslavia	3
Denmark	0
15th place
11 May
Austria	3
Portugal	0

==== 13–16th place semi-finals ====
10 May 1974
12:00

Yugoslavia	4–0	Portugal

10 May 1974
12:00

Denmark	1–0	Austria

==== 15th and 16th place ====
11 May 1974
15:30

Austria	3–0	Portugal

==== 13th and 14th place ====
11 May 1974
15:30

Yugoslavia	3–0	Denmark

=== Ninth to 12th place classification ===
==== 9–12th place semi-finals ====
10 May 1974
15:30

Czechoslovakia	2–0	Italy

10 May 1974
17:30

Belgium	1–0	Ireland

==== 11th and 12th place ====
11 May 1974
15:30

Ireland	1–0	Italy

==== Ninth and tenth place ====
11 May 1974
12:00

Czechoslovakia	2–1	Belgium

== First to eighth place classification ==
=== Bracket ===
Quarter-finals
8 May
Spain	2
France	1
8 May
Netherlands	6
Scotland	0
8 May
West Germany	5
Poland	1
8 May
England (a.e.t.)	2
Wales	1

Semi-finals
10 May
Spain	1
Netherlands	0
10 May
West Germany	5
England	0

Final
11 May
Spain	1
West Germany	0
Third place
11 May
Netherlands	4
England	1

=== Quarter-finals ===
8 May 1974
12:00

England	2–1 (a.e.t.)	Wales

8 May 1974
15:30

West Germany	5–1	Poland

8 May 1974
18:30

Spain	2–1	France

8 May 1974
18:30

Netherlands	6–0	Scotland

=== Fifth to eighth place classification ===
5–8th place semi-finals
10 May
Poland	4
Wales	3
10 May
France	2
Scotland	1

Fifth place
11 May
Poland	2
France	1
Seventh place
11 May
Scotland	1
Wales	0

==== 5–8th place semi-finals ====
10 May 1974
15:30

France	2–1	Scotland

10 May 1974
17:30

Poland	4–3	Wales

==== Seventh and eighth place ====
11 May 1974
12:00

Scotland	1–0	Wales

==== Fifth and sixth place ====
11 May 1974
12:00

Poland	2–1	France

=== First to fourth place classification ===
==== Semi-finals ====
10 May 1974
16:30

Spain	1–0	Netherlands

10 May 1974
18:30

West Germany	5–0	England

==== Third and fourth place ====
11 May 1974
15:30

Netherlands	4–1	England

==== Final ====
11 May 1974
18:30

Spain	1–0	West Germany

== Final standings ==
1. Spain
2. West Germany
3. Netherlands
4. England
5. Poland
6. France
7. Scotland
8. Wales
9. Czechoslovakia
10. Belgium
11. Ireland
12. Italy
13. Yugoslavia
14. Denmark
15. Austria
16. Portugal
17. Switzerland
18. Finland

== See also ==
- 1974 EuroHockey Club Champions Cup
