= Field hockey at the 1955 Mediterranean Games =

- Dates: 17 July 1955 – 19 July 1955

Field hockey was one of several sports at the 1955 Mediterranean Games. The second Mediterranean Games was held in Barcelona, Spain. Only men's teams participated in the field hockey tournament.

== Medalists ==
Event	Gold	Silver	Bronze
Men's Competition	Spain	Egypt	France

== Group matches ==
	Team	Points	G	W	D	L	GF	GA	Diff
1.	Spain	6	3	3	0	0	9	1	+8
2.	Egypt	4	3	1	2	0	2	3	–1
3.	France	2	3	0	2	1	2	3	–1
4.	Italy	1	3	0	1	2	0	6	–6

- July 17, 1955

Egypt	1 – 1	France
Spain	5 – 0	Italy

- July 18, 1955

France	0 – 0	Italy
Spain	2 – 0	Egypt

- July 19, 1955

Egypt	1 – 0	Italy
Spain	2 – 1	France

== Standings ==
Rank	Team
1st place, gold medalist(s)	Spain
2nd place, silver medalist(s)	Egypt
3rd place, bronze medalist(s)	France
4	Italy
