= Men's EuroHockey Championship =

Biannual European field hockey tournament

- Most recent season or competition: 2025 Men's EuroHockey Championship
- Sport: Field hockey
- Founded: 1970; 56 years ago
- First season: 1970
- No. of teams: 8
- Continent: EHF (Europe)
- Most recent champion: Germany (9th title) (2025)
- Most titles: Germany (9 titles)
- Level on pyramid: 1

The Men's EuroHockey Championship is an international men's field hockey competition organised by the European Hockey Federation (EHF) for the top eight European national teams. It is the top division of the EuroHockey Championships. The tournament started in 1970. When the tournament is held close to the Summer Olympic games or the Men's FIH Hockey World Cup, the winner of the tournament is awarded a place in those competitions.

The tournament has been won by five different national teams: Germany has the most titles with nine, the Netherlands follow with seven, Spain has two wins and England and Belgium have one title each.

The most recent edition, held in Mönchengladbach, Germany, was won by the Germany who won their ninth title by defeating the Netherlands 4–1 in the shoot-out in the final.

== Format ==
Since 2005 the tournament is played in Divisions, normally consisting of 8 teams. The top division, containing the eight best national teams, is called the EuroHockey Championship, below which there is the Men's EuroHockey Championship II, then the Men's EuroHockey Championship III, then the EuroHockey Championship IV.

=== Qualification ===
National teams qualify for a division based on their performance in the previous competition. Each time the competition is held, it is with each division's previous top two teams promoted (assuming there is a higher division), and its previous bottom two teams demoted (assuming there is a lower division).

1. 1970–1974: No Qualification
2. 1978–2003 and 2023–present: Qualification tournament
3. 2005–2021: Via Men's EuroHockey Championship II and Men's EuroHockey Championship III and EuroHockey Championship IV

=== Summary ===
Assuming divisions consisting of the standard 8 teams, the teams are separated into two pools of four teams. In each pool (pool A and B) the teams play one match against each of the other teams in their pool (three in total). The teams then go on to play classification matches based on their relative ranking from these pool matches to determine their final tournament position.

=== Details ===
In each pool, A, and B, all the teams play each other once, with points awarded as follows:

- 3 points for a win
- 1 point for a draw
- 0 points for a loss

Upon completion of these matches, each team in the pool is ranked according to the number of points each has accumulated. If any teams in the pool have the same rank, then these teams are ranked:

- According to the number of matches they won, or else, if equal
- According to respective goal difference ('goals for' less 'goals against'), or else
- According to 'goals for', or else
- If only two teams are involved, according to the result of the match played between those teams, or else
- According to the results of a penalty stroke competition between those teams, or else
- This procedure is repeated using the penalty stroke result until the teams can be ranked

Once the relative ranking of the teams in pools A and B is settled, the semi-finals proceed with two games as follows:

- Second Pool A v first Pool B
- First Pool A v Second Pool B

The winners of these matches then play a match against each other for 1st and 2nd places (the final) and the losing teams play a match against each other for 3rd and 4th places (Bronze medal match).

The third and fourth placed teams in each pool are placed in Pool C (the Relegation Pool) in order to determine fifth to eighth places. Each team plays one match against the two teams that they did not previously play. The results from those games and from the game that was previously played against the other team in their original pool are used to rank each team according to the ranking procedure used in Pool A and B.

== Dates ==
The senior (men's and women's) Nations tournaments are held over seven to eight consecutive days (including rest days) some time during the last two weeks of July and the first four weeks of August every odd numbered year (2009, 2011, etc.).

== Results ==
| # | Year | Host | Final | | | Third place match | | | Teams |
| # | Year | Host | Winner | Score | Runner-up | Third place | Score | Fourth place | Teams |
|---|---|---|---|---|---|---|---|---|---|
| 1 | 1970; Details | Brussels, Belgium | West Germany | 3–1 | Netherlands | Spain | 2–1 | France | 19 |
| 2 | 1974; Details | Madrid, Spain | Spain | 1–0 | West Germany | Netherlands | 4–1 | England | 18 |
| 3 | 1978; Details | Hanover, West Germany | West Germany | 3–2 | Netherlands | England | 2–0 | Spain | 12 |
| 4 | 1983; Details | Amsterdam, Netherlands | Netherlands | 2–2 (a.e.t.) (8–6 p.s.) | Soviet Union | West Germany | 3–1 | Spain | 12 |
| 5 | 1987; Details | Moscow, Soviet Union | Netherlands | 1–1 (a.e.t.) (3–0 p.s.) | England | West Germany | 3–2 (a.e.t.) | Soviet Union | 12 |
| 6 | 1991; Details | Paris, France | Germany | 3–1 | Netherlands | England | 1–1 (a.e.t.) (2–1 p.s.) | Soviet Union | 12 |
| 7 | 1995; Details | Dublin, Ireland | Germany | 2–2 (a.e.t.) (9–8 p.s.) | Netherlands | England | 2–1 | Belgium | 12 |
| 8 | 1999; Details | Padua, Italy | Germany | 3–3 (a.e.t.) (8–7 p.s.) | Netherlands | England | 7–2 | Belgium | 12 |
| 9 | 2003; Details | Barcelona, Spain | Germany | 1–1 (a.e.t.) (5–4 p.s.) | Spain | England | 1–1 (a.e.t.) (6–5 p.s.) | Netherlands | 12 |
| 10 | 2005; Details | Leipzig, Germany | Spain | 4–2 | Netherlands | Germany | 9–1 | Belgium | 8 |
| 11 | 2007; Details | Manchester, England | Netherlands | 3–2 | Spain | Belgium | 4–3 | Germany | 8 |
| 12 | 2009; Details | Amstelveen, Netherlands | England | 5–3 | Germany | Netherlands | 6–1 | Spain | 8 |
| 13 | 2011; Details | Mönchengladbach, Germany | Germany | 4–2 | Netherlands | England | 2–1 | Belgium | 8 |
| 14 | 2013; Details | Boom, Belgium | Germany | 3–1 | Belgium | Netherlands | 3–2 | England | 8 |
| 15 | 2015; Details | London, England | Netherlands | 6–1 | Germany | Ireland | 4–2 | England | 8 |
| 16 | 2017; Details | Amstelveen, Netherlands | Netherlands | 4–2 | Belgium | England | 4–2 | Germany | 8 |
| 17 | 2019; Details | Antwerp, Belgium | Belgium | 5–0 | Spain | Netherlands | 4–0 | Germany | 8 |
| 18 | 2021; Details | Amstelveen, Netherlands | Netherlands | 2–2 (4–1 p.s.o.) | Germany | Belgium | 3–2 | England | 8 |
| 19 | 2023; Details | Mönchengladbach, Germany | Netherlands | 2–1 | England | Belgium | 2–0 | Germany | 8 |
| 20 | 2025; Details | Mönchengladbach, Germany | Germany | 1–1 (4–1 p.s.o.) | Netherlands | Spain | 2–0 | France | 8 |
| 21 | 2027; Details | London, England | | | | | | | 12 |
| 22 | 2029; Details | Amsterdam, Netherlands | | | | | | | 12 |

== Top four statistics ==
| Team | Champions | Runners-up | Third-place | Fourth-place |
|---|---|---|---|---|
| Germany (Note: Includes results representing West Germany between 1970 and 1990) | 9 (1970, 1978, 1991, 1995, 1999, 2003, 2011*, 2013, 2025*) | 4 (1974, 2009, 2015, 2021) | 3 (1983, 1987, 2005) | 4 (2007, 2017, 2019, 2023*) |
| Netherlands | 7 (1983, 1987, 2007, 2015, 2017*, 2021*, 2023) | 8 (1970, 1978, 1991, 1995, 1999, 2005, 2011, 2025) | 4 (1974, 2009, 2013, 2019) | 1 (2003) |
| Spain | 2 (1974, 2005) | 3 (2003, 2007, 2019) | 2 (1970, 2025) | 3 (1978, 1983, 2009) |
| England | 1 (2009) | 2 (1987, 2023) | 7 (1978, 1991, 1995, 1999, 2003, 2011, 2017) | 4 (1974, 2013, 2015*, 2021) |
| Belgium | 1 (2019*) | 2 (2013*, 2017) | 3 (2007, 2021, 2023) | 4 (1995, 1999, 2005, 2011) |
| Soviet Union | | 1 (1983) | | 2 (1987*, 1991) |
| Ireland | | | 1 (2015) | |
| France | | | | 2 (1970, 2025) |

* = host

== Team appearances ==
| Team | (Belgium) 1970 | (Spain) 1974 | (West Germany) 1978 | (Netherlands) 1983 | (Soviet Union) 1987 | (France) 1991 | (Republic of Ireland) 1995 | (Italy) 1999 | (Spain) 2003 | (Germany) 2005 | (England) 2007 | (Netherlands) 2009 | (Germany) 2011 | (Belgium) 2013 | (England) 2015 | (Netherlands) 2017 | (Belgium) 2019 | (Netherlands) 2021 | (Germany) 2023 | (Germany) 2025 | (England) 2027 | Total |
|---|---|---|---|---|---|---|---|---|---|---|---|---|---|---|---|---|---|---|---|---|---|---|
| Austria | 11th | 15th | – | 11th | – | – | – | – | – | – | – | 7th | – | – | – | 7th | – | – | 7th | 8th | Q | 8 |
| Belarus | Part of the Soviet Union | | | | | | 9th | – | – | – | – | – | – | – | – | – | – | – | – | – | | 1 |
| Belgium | 5th | 10th | – | 8th | 10th | 9th | 4th | 4th | 6th | 4th | 3rd | 5th | 4th | 2nd | 5th | 2nd | 1st | 3rd | 3rd | 5th | Q | 20 |
| Czech Republic | Part of Czechoslovakia | | | | | | – | – | – | – | 8th | – | – | 8th | – | – | – | – | – | – | | 2 |
| Czechoslovakia | 10th | 9th | 10th | – | – | – | Defunct | | | | | | | | | | | | | | | 3 |
| Denmark | 18th | 14th | – | – | – | – | – | – | – | – | – | – | – | – | – | – | – | – | – | – | | 2 |
| England | 6th | 4th | 3rd | 5th | 2nd | 3rd | 3rd | 3rd | 3rd | 6th | 5th | 1st | 3rd | 4th | 4th | 3rd | 5th | 4th | 2nd | 6th | Q | 21 |
| Finland | 16th | 18th | – | – | – | – | – | – | – | – | – | – | – | – | – | – | – | – | – | – | | 2 |
| France | 4th | 6th | 7th | 6th | 11th | 6th | 12th | 7th | 5th | 5th | 6th | 6th | 8th | – | 7th | – | – | 6th | 5th | 4th | Q | 18 |
| Germany | 1st | 2nd | 1st | 3rd | 3rd | 1st | 1st | 1st | 1st | 3rd | 4th | 2nd | 1st | 1st | 2nd | 4th | 4th | 2nd | 4th | 1st | Q | 21 |
| Gibraltar | – | – | 12th | – | – | – | – | – | – | – | – | – | – | – | – | – | – | – | – | – | | 1 |
| Hungary | 17th | – | – | – | – | – | – | – | – | – | – | – | – | – | – | – | – | – | – | – | | 1 |
| Ireland | 9th | 11th | 8th | 10th | 6th | 7th | 5th | 11th | 9th | – | 7th | – | 5th | 6th | 3rd | 6th | 8th | – | – | – | Q | 16 |
| Italy | 13th | 12th | – | – | 9th | 12th | – | 12th | 10th | – | – | – | – | – | – | – | – | – | – | – | | 6 |
| Malta | 19th | – | – | – | – | – | – | – | – | – | – | – | – | – | – | – | – | – | – | – | | 1 |
| Netherlands | 2nd | 3rd | 2nd | 1st | 1st | 2nd | 2nd | 2nd | 4th | 2nd | 1st | 3rd | 2nd | 3rd | 1st | 1st | 3rd | 1st | 1st | 2nd | Q | 21 |
| Poland | 7th | 5th | 5th | 9th | 5th | 8th | 6th | 9th | 7th | 7th | – | 8th | – | 7th | – | 8th | – | – | – | 7th | Q | 15 |
| Portugal | – | 16th | – | – | – | – | – | – | – | – | – | – | – | – | – | – | – | – | – | – | | 1 |
| Russia | Part of the Soviet Union | | | | | | – | 8th | 12th | – | – | – | 7th | – | 8th | – | – | 8th | – | – | | 5 |
| Scotland | 15th | 7th | 11th | 7th | 8th | – | 10th | – | 8th | 8th | – | – | – | – | – | – | 7th | – | – | – | | 9 |
| Soviet Union | 14th | – | 9th | 2nd | 4th | 4th | Defunct | | | | | | | | | | | | | | | 5 |
| Spain | 3rd | 1st | 4th | 4th | 7th | 5th | 8th | 5th | 2nd | 1st | 2nd | 4th | 6th | 5th | 6th | 5th | 2nd | 5th | 6th | 3rd | Q | 21 |
| Switzerland | 8th | 17th | – | – | – | 11th | 11th | 10th | 11th | – | – | – | – | – | – | – | – | – | – | – | | 6 |
| Wales | 12th | 8th | 6th | 12th | 12th | 10th | 7th | 6th | – | – | – | – | – | – | – | – | 6th | 7th | 8th | – | Q | 12 |
| Yugoslavia | – | 13th | – | – | – | – | Defunct | | | | | | | | | | | | | | | 1 |
| Total | 19 | 18 | 12 | 12 | 12 | 12 | 12 | 12 | 12 | 8 | 8 | 8 | 8 | 8 | 8 | 8 | 8 | 8 | 8 | 8 | 12 | |

== See also ==
- Men's EuroHockey Championship II
- Men's EuroHockey Indoor Championship
- Men's EuroHockey U21 Championship
- Men's EuroHockey5s Championship
- Women's EuroHockey Championship
