= Women's FIH Hockey World Cup =

International field hockey tournament

- Current season, competition or edition: 2026 Women's FIH Hockey World Cup
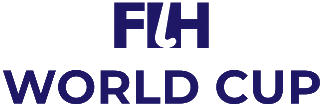
- Sport: Field hockey
- Founded: 1974; 52 years ago
- First season: 1974
- Organizing body: FIH
- No. of teams: 16
- Continent: International
- Most recent champion: Argentina (3rd title) (2026)
- Most titles: Netherlands (9 titles)
- Website: fih.hockey/worldcup

The Women's FIH Hockey World Cup is the field hockey World Cup competition for women, whose format for qualification and the final tournament is similar to the men's. It has been held since 1974. The tournament has been organized by the International Hockey Federation (FIH) since they merged with the International Federation of Women's Hockey Associations (IFWHA) in 1982. Since 1986, it has been held regularly once every four years, in the same year as the men's competition, which is mid-cycle between Summer Olympic games.

Of the sixteen tournaments held, only four teams have won the event. Netherlands is the most successful team, having won the title nine times. Argentina has won three titles; Germany and Australia have won two titles each. The Netherlands, Australia and Germany are able to defend their titles. At the end of the 2026 World Cup, fifteen nations had reached the semifinal of the tournament.

The size of the tournament has changed over time. The 1974 and 1978 World Cups featured 10 nations (smallest); the 1976 World Cup featured 11 nations; the 2002 World Cup featured 16 nations (largest), and the remaining seven World Cups have featured 12 nations. The World Cup was again expanded to 16 teams in 2018.

The 2022 tournament was held in Amstelveen and Terrassa from 1–17 July, with Netherlands winning a third consecutive title and a record ninth title after beating Argentina 3–1 in the final.

== Results ==
=== Summaries ===
#	Year	Host	Final			Third place match			Teams
#	Year	Host	Winner (gold)	Score	Runner-up (silver)	Third place (bronze)	Score	Fourth place	Teams
1	1974; Details	Mandelieu, France	Netherlands	1–0	Argentina	West Germany	2–0	India	10
2	1976; Details	West Berlin, West Germany	West Germany	2–0	Argentina	Netherlands	1–0	Belgium	11
3	1978; Details	Madrid, Spain	Netherlands	1–0	West Germany	Belgium	0–0 (3–2); Penalty strokes	Argentina	10
4	1981; Details	Buenos Aires, Argentina	West Germany	1–1 (3–1); Penalty strokes	Netherlands	Soviet Union	5–1	Australia	12
5	1983; Details	Kuala Lumpur, Malaysia	Netherlands	4–2	Canada	Australia	3–1	West Germany	12
6	1986; Details	Amstelveen, Netherlands	Netherlands	3–0	West Germany	Canada	3–2	New Zealand	12
7	1990; Details	Sydney, Australia	Netherlands	3–1	Australia	South Korea	3–2	England	12
8	1994; Details	Dublin, Ireland	Australia	2–0	Argentina	United States	2–1	Germany	12
9	1998; Details	Utrecht, Netherlands	Australia	3–2	Netherlands	Germany	3–2	Argentina	12
10	2002; Details	Perth, Australia	Argentina	1–1 (4–3); Penalty strokes	Netherlands	China	2–0	Australia	16
11	2006; Details	Madrid, Spain	Netherlands	3–1	Australia	Argentina	5–0	Spain	12
12	2010; Details	Rosario, Argentina	Argentina	3–1	Netherlands	England	2–0	Germany	12
13	2014; Details	The Hague, Netherlands	Netherlands	2–0	Australia	Argentina	2–1	United States	12
14	2018; Details	London, England	Netherlands	6–0	Ireland	Spain	3–1	Australia	16
15	2022; Details	Terrassa, Spain & Amstelveen, Netherlands	Netherlands	3–1	Argentina	Australia	2–1	Germany	16
16	2026; Details	Wavre, Belgium & Amstelveen, Netherlands	Argentina	1–1 (3–1); Penalty shootout	Netherlands	Belgium	1–0	Australia	16
17	2030; Details	TBD							

=== Successful national teams ===
Team	Titles	Runners-up	Third places	Fourth places
Netherlands	9 (1974, 1978, 1983, 1986*, 1990, 2006, 2014*, 2018, 2022*)	5 (1981, 1998*, 2002, 2010, 2026*)	1 (1976)	
Argentina	3 (2002, 2010*, 2026)	4 (1974, 1976, 1994, 2022)	2 (2006, 2014)	2 (1978, 1998)
Australia	2 (1994, 1998)	3 (1990*, 2006, 2014)	2 (1983, 2022)	4 (1981, 2002*, 2018, 2026)
Germany^	2 (1976*, 1981)	2 (1978, 1986)	2 (1974, 1998)	4 (1983, 1994, 2010, 2022)
Canada		1 (1983)	1 (1986)	
Ireland		1 (2018)		
Belgium			2 (1978, 2026*)	1 (1976)
United States			1 (1994)	1 (2014)
England			1 (2010)	1 (1990)
Spain			1 (2018)	1 (2006*)
Soviet Union#			1 (1981)	
South Korea			1 (1990)	
China			1 (2002)	
India				1 (1974)
New Zealand				1 (1986)

* = host country
^ = includes results representing West Germany between 1974 and 1990
# = states that have since split into two or more independent countries

=== Performance by continental zones ===
Continent	Best performance
Europe	11 titles, won by the Netherlands (9) and Germany (2)
America	3 titles, won by Argentina
Oceania	2 titles, won by Australia
Asia	Third place (Korea, 1990 and China, 2002)
Africa	Seventh place (South Africa, 1998)

== Team appearances ==
Team	(France) 1974	(Germany) 1976	(Spain) 1978	(Argentina) 1981	(Malaysia) 1983	(Netherlands) 1986	(Australia) 1990	(Ireland) 1994	(Netherlands) 1998	(Australia) 2002	(Spain) 2006	(Argentina) 2010	(Netherlands) 2014	(England) 2018	(Spain) (Netherlands) 2022	(Belgium) (Netherlands) 2026	Total
Argentina	2nd	2nd	4th	6th	9th	7th	9th	2nd	4th	1st	3rd	1st	3rd	7th	2nd	1st	16
Australia	–	–	–	4th	3rd	6th	2nd	1st	1st	4th	2nd	5th	2nd	4th	3rd	4th	13
Austria	8th	9th	–	12th	–	–	–	–	–	–	–	–	–	–	–	–	3
Belgium	5th	4th	3rd	8th	–	–	–	–	–	–	–	–	12th	10th	6th	3rd	8
Canada	–	–	5th	5th	2nd	3rd	10th	10th	–	–	–	–	–	–	15th	–	7
Chile	–	–	–	–	–	–	–	–	–	–	–	–	–	–	13th	16th	2
China	–	–	–	–	–	–	6th	7th	11th	3rd	10th	8th	6th	16th	9th	8th	10
Czechoslovakia#	–	–	9th	–	–	–	–	Defunct									1
England	–	–	–	–	5th	5th	4th	9th	9th	5th	7th	3rd	11th	6th	8th	9th	12
France	7th	6th	–	9th	–	–	–	–	–	–	–	–	–	–	–	–	3
Germany^	3rd	1st	2nd	1st	4th	2nd	8th	4th	3rd	7th	8th	4th	8th	5th	4th	6th	16
India	4th	–	7th	–	11th	–	–	–	12th	–	11th	9th	–	8th	9th	5th	9
Ireland	–	–	–	–	–	12th	–	11th	–	15th	–	–	–	2nd	11th	13th	5
Italy	–	10th	–	–	–	–	–	–	–	–	–	–	–	9th	–	–	2
Japan	–	–	6th	7th	–	–	11th	–	–	10th	5th	11th	10th	13th	11th	11th	10
Mexico	10th	7th	–	11th	–	–	–	–	–	–	–	–	–	–	–	–	3
Netherlands	1st	3rd	1st	2nd	1st	1st	1st	6th	2nd	2nd	1st	2nd	1st	1st	1st	2nd	16
New Zealand	–	–	–	–	7th	4th	7th	–	6th	11th	–	7th	5th	11th	5th	15th	10
Nigeria	–	11th	10th	–	–	–	–	–	–	–	–	–	–	–	–	–	2
Russia	Part of the Soviet Union							12th	–	16th	–	–	–	–	–	–	2
Scotland	–	–	–	–	8th	10th	–	–	10th	12th	–	–	–	–	–	12th	5
South Africa	–	–	–	–	–	–	–	–	7th	13th	12th	10th	9th	15th	15th	14th	8
South Korea	–	–	–	–	–	–	3rd	5th	5th	6th	9th	6th	7th	12th	13th	–	9
Soviet Union#	–	–	–	3rd	10th	8th	–	Defunct									3
Spain	6th	5th	8th	10th	–	11th	5th	8th	–	8th	4th	12th	–	3rd	7th	7th	13
Switzerland	9th	8th	–	–	–	–	–	–	–	–	–	–	–	–	–	–	2
Ukraine	Part of the Soviet Union							–	–	14th	–	–	–	–	–	–	1
United States	–	–	–	–	6th	9th	12th	3rd	8th	9th	6th	–	4th	14th	–	10th	10
Wales	–	–	–	–	12th	–	–	–	–	–	–	–	–	–	–	–	1
Total	10	11	10	12	12	12	12	12	12	16	12	12	12	16	16	16	

^ = includes results representing West Germany between 1974 and 1990
# = states that have since split into two or more independent nations

== Debut of teams ==
Year	Debuting teams			Successor and renamed teams
Year	Teams	No.	CT	Successor and renamed teams
1974	Argentina, Austria, Belgium, France, India, Mexico, Netherlands, Spain, Switzerland, West Germany^	10	10	
1976	Italy, Nigeria	2	12	
1978	Canada, Czechoslovakia*, Japan	3	15	
1981	Australia, Soviet Union*	2	17	
1983	England, New Zealand, Scotland, United States, Wales	5	22	
1986	Ireland	1	23	
1990	China, South Korea	2	25	
1994	Russia#	1	26	Germany
1998	South Africa	1	27	
2002	Ukraine#	1	28	
2006–2018	No debuts	0	0	
2022	Chile	1	29	
2026	No debuts	0	0	

* = Defunct Team
# = Part of Soviet Union (1974–1990)
^ = Germany is official successor of West Germany

Argentina, Germany and the Netherlands are the only teams to have competed at each World Cup; 29 teams have competed in at least one World Cup.

== See also ==
- Field hockey at the Summer Olympics
- Women's IFWHA World Conference
- Men's FIH Hockey World Cup
- Women's FIH Hockey Junior World Cup
- Women's FIH Pro League
- Men's FIH Hockey Junior World Cup
- Men's FIH Indoor Hockey World Cup
- Women's FIH Indoor Hockey World Cup
- FIH Para Hockey World Cup
