= Yugoslavia men's national field hockey team =

Yugoslavia
- Confederation: EHF (Europe)

European Championship
- Appearances: 1 (first in 1974)
- Best result: 13th (1974)

The Yugoslavia men's national field hockey team represented Yugoslavia in men's international field hockey competitions.

The team participated in one European Championship when it finished in 13th place at the 1974 edition.

== Tournament record ==
=== European Championship ===
- 1974 – 13th place (Yugoslavia team: Belošević, Mudrinić, Žužić, Radić, Ronjec, Šmit, Prahin, Ivković, Ovčarić, Sabo, Leljak)

=== Mediterranean Games ===
- 1963 – 4th place (Yugoslavia team: Gulija, Miletic, Pesic, Bogovic, Tavorovic, Sepic, Krajina, Hochberger, Sreten Stanojevic, Leljak, Stanic)
- 1979 – 1st place (Yugoslavia team: Jovetić, Marcikić, Šmit, Prčić, Jurgec, Ćosić, Radić, Ronjec, Prahin, Ivković, Farkaš, Pravica, Škrlec, Sučević, Ivić, Vinski coach: P. Ivković)

== See also ==
- Croatia men's national field hockey team
- Slovenia men's national field hockey team
